= 2016–17 Luton Town F.C. season =

English football club season

Luton Town F.C.
2016–17 season
- Owner: Luton Town Football Club 2020 Limited
- Chairman: Nick Owen
- Manager: Nathan Jones
- Stadium: Kenilworth Road
- League Two: 4th
- Play-offs: Semi-final (eliminated by Blackpool)
- FA Cup: Third round (eliminated by Accrington Stanley)
- EFL Cup: Second round (eliminated by Leeds United)
- EFL Trophy: Semi-final (eliminated by Oxford United)
- Top goalscorer: League: Danny Hylton (21); All: Danny Hylton (27)
- Highest home attendance: 10,032 vs Blackpool, League Two play-offs, 18 May 2017
- Lowest home attendance: 1,441 vs West Bromwich Albion U21, EFL Trophy, 4 October 2016
- Average home league attendance: 8,046
Home colours	Away colours	Third colours

The 2016–17 season was the 131st in the history of Luton Town Football Club, a professional association football club based in Luton, Bedfordshire, England. Their 11th-place finish in 2015–16 meant it was the club's third consecutive season in League Two and 91st season in the English Football League. The season ran from 1 July 2016 to 30 June 2017.

Luton finished the season in fourth-place in the League Two table. This meant they qualified for the play-offs, losing to Blackpool in the semi-final. The club were eliminated in the second round of the EFL Cup, the third round of the FA Cup and the semi-final of the EFL Trophy.

== Background and pre-season ==
The 2015–16 season was John Still's third start to a season as manager of Luton Town, having been appointed in February 2013. Still was sacked in December 2015 with Luton 17th in League Two after four straight defeats. He was replaced by Nathan Jones, who had been first-team coach at Championship club Brighton & Hove Albion. Luton finished in 11th-place in the 2015–16 League Two table.

At the end of the 2015–16 season, Luton released Jake Howells, Alex Lawless, Paul Benson, Isaac Galliford, Scott Griffiths, Ryan Hall, Mark Onyemah, Luke Trotman and Curtley Williams. Matt Robinson was initially placed on the transfer list, along with Mark O'Brien and Magnus Okuonghae, before he was released one year early from his contract along with Elliot Justham one week later. Zane Banton signed a new one-year contract, with the option of a one-year extension, Pelly Ruddock Mpanzu signed a new two-year contract, and Craig King had a one-year option on his contract taken up. Paddy McCourt was later released one year early from his contract by mutual consent. Luton made eight summer signings, including goalkeeper Christian Walton on loan from Brighton & Hove Albion, defenders Glen Rea from Brighton & Hove Albion, Alan Sheehan from Bradford City, Johnny Mullins from Oxford United, midfielder Jake Gray from Crystal Palace, and strikers Danny Hylton from Oxford United, Jordan Cook from Walsall, and Isaac Vassell from Truro City.

Pre-season match details
Date	Opponents	Venue	Result	Score F–A	Scorers	Attendance	Ref.
9 July 2016	Paksi	A	D	0–0		—	
16 July 2016	Bedford Town	A	W	9–0	Potts 5', McQuoid 27', McGeehan 35', Hylton 44' pen., Banton 50', Marriott (3) 52', 58', 63', Hawkes 56' o.g.	812	
19 July 2016	Boreham Wood	A	L	0–1		—	
23 July 2016	Brighton & Hove Albion	H	W	2–1	Marriott (2) 1', 58'	2,372	
26 July 2016	Woking	A	D	1–1	McQuoid 25' pen.	547	
30 July 2016	Walsall	H	L	0–1		1,651	

== Review ==
=== August ===
Luton began the season away to last season's League Two play-off finalists, Plymouth Argyle and won the match 3–0. Danny Hylton opened the scoring in the 50th minute from close range after Plymouth failed to clear O'Donnell's cross. Jack Marriott scored from a side-footed shot before Jonathan Smith scored a third goal in the sixth minute of stoppage time. The next match saw Luton play newly relegated Championship club Aston Villa at home in the first round of the EFL Cup, with the visitors taking the lead in the 13th minute through a scuffed shot by Jordan Ayew. Luton responded with an equaliser in the 35th minute through Jake Gray who scored with a neat finish before Cameron McGeehan put Luton ahead with a tap-in goal after an attempt on goal by Gray rebounded off goalkeeper Mark Bunn and Jack Grealish into his path. An own goal in the 66th minute by Jores Okore secured a 3–1 win for Luton. This was followed by Luton's first home league match of the season as they were held to a 1–1 draw by Yeovil Town. Stephen O'Donnell opened the scoring with a 25-yard shot in the 26th minute before Tom Eaves converted a Kevin Dawson cross to score the equaliser. McGeehan scored a penalty to give Luton a 62nd-minute lead at home to Newport County, before the visitors equalised eight minutes later through Jennison Myrie-Williams. After a challenge on Pelly Ruddock Mpanzu, McGeehan scored another penalty and Luton's second goal in second half stoppage time to secure a 2–1 win.

Luton suffered their first defeat of the season after losing 2–1 away to local rivals Stevenage. McGeehan scored the opening goal in the 15th minute from a deflection that wrong-footed Jamie Jones before the home team equalised through a Connor Hunte header on 53 minutes. After Olly Lee hit the crossbar, Matt Godden scored the winner in the 96th minute from a Tom Pett counter-attack, a result that saw them earn their first ever home win over Luton. This was followed by a 1–0 defeat at home to Leeds United in the second round of the EFL Cup, who scored in the 23rd minute through debutant Tyler Denton. Luton returned to winning ways after a 3–0 win away to Cambridge United. Josh Coulson scored an own goal on 62 minutes to put Luton in front before Marriott scored a minute later from outside the box into the top corner to beat goalkeeper Will Norris. Hylton scored the third goal with a powerful shot in second half stoppage time. Luton's first match in the EFL Trophy was away to Gillingham, which they won 2–1. Frankie Musonda scored his first professional goal with a header to give Luton a 10th-minute lead before Smith doubled the lead on 24 minutes. Darren Oldaker scored a consolation goal for Gillingham in second half stoppage time, before Connor Tomlinson came on as a late substitute for Luton to become the club's youngest player to make his first-team debut at 15 years and 199 days old. Newcastle United midfielder Alex Gilliead, an England under-20 international, was signed on loan until 7 January 2017, and defender Jack Senior was signed on a two-year contract from Huddersfield Town. Cameron McJannett, a second-year scholar, joined Premier League club Stoke City for an undisclosed fee after signing his first professional contract, and Magnus Okuonghae was released after his contract was cancelled by mutual consent.

=== September ===
Luton moved back to the top of the table after a 4–1 win over Wycombe Wanderers. Hylton converted a Mpanzu cross to open the scoring in the 10th minute before he doubled the lead on 56 minutes with a tap-in goal after Jamal Blackman parried a low shot from McGeehan. Matt Bloomfield scored a consolation goal for Wycombe seven minutes later, before Hylton won a penalty, which he converted in the 88th minute to complete his hat-trick, and in stoppage time Jordan Cook scored Luton's fourth goal. Transfer listed defender Mark O'Brien joined National League club Southport on a three-month loan. Luton's unbeaten home record came to an end after a 2–1 defeat to Grimsby Town, who took the lead in the 29th minute through Omar Bogle, after a shot from Luke Summerfield rebounded into his path. Glen Rea equalised in the 59th minute with a shot from 25 yards into the bottom corner, before Bogle scored their winning goal with a header from Kayden Jackson's cross on 82 minutes. Luton lost 2–0 away to Crawley Town, who scored in each half through James Collins and Enzio Boldewijn. This was followed by a 3–1 home win over Doncaster Rovers, with the visitors taking the lead on 21 minutes through James Coppinger from close range, before McGeehan scored the equaliser in the 36th minute from Lee's cross. Marriott gave Luton the lead on 41 minutes after slotting the ball under goalkeeper Marko Maroši, and in the second half McGeehan scored a penalty in the 81st minute. Luton moved up to second in the table after a 1–1 away draw with Hartlepool United, who took the lead in the first half through Nathan Thomas, before Alan Sheehan equalised for Luton with a free kick in the 78th minute.

=== October ===
Luton were held to a 1–1 draw away to Cheltenham Town, and took the lead on 52 minutes through Hylton after rounding goalkeeper Russell Griffiths, before Daniel O'Shaughnessy equalised with a powerful shot 12 minutes later. Progression to the second round of the EFL Trophy came after a 2–0 win over West Bromwich Albion U21 in their second group stage match, in which Gilliead opened the scoring with his first goal for Luton in the 60th minute, before Gray doubled the lead two minutes later. A third successive league draw followed after Luton were held 1–1 at home by Crewe Alexandra, in which Hylton gave Luton the lead shortly before half-time, before Ryan Lowe equalised on 64 minutes from George Cooper's cross. McGeehan scored with a shot into an empty net to give Luton a 30th-minute lead away to Leyton Orient, after Marriott had a shot blocked by goalkeeper Alex Cisak. Hylton doubled the lead on 74 minutes with his eighth league goal of the season, before Ollie Palmer scored a consolation goal for Leyton Orient five minutes later with a shot in off the post. Luton drew 1–1 at home to Mansfield Town, with the visitors taking the lead in the ninth minute through Matt Green, his eighth goal of the season with a header, before McGeehan equalised in the 77th minute with a shot from 25 yards. This was followed by a 0–0 away draw with Notts County, in which Christian Walton saved a Vadaine Oliver penalty.

=== November ===
Luton won 3–1 away in their first-round match of the FA Cup against Exeter City, with Hylton scoring an 11th-minute penalty to give Luton the lead, before Reuben Reid equalised for Exeter on 39 minutes after a long-range shot from Ethan Ampadu hit the post, which fell to Reid who tapped in the rebound. After Rea restored Luton's lead in the 71st minute, Hylton scored a second penalty on 86 minutes after Craig Mackail-Smith was fouled by Troy Archibald-Henville. This was followed by a 3–1 defeat at home to Millwall in the third and final EFL Trophy group stage match, in which Luton took the lead on 57 minutes when Mackail-Smith's cross resulted in an own goal from Shaun Hutchinson. Fred Onyedinma equalised for Millwall in the 71st minute from Gregg Wylde's cross, before two goals later in the second half from Harry Smith on his debut finished the scoring for the visitors. McGeehan scored in the 75th minute from a James Justin cross as Luton beat Accrington Stanley 1–0 at home to extend their unbeaten league run to eight matches. Luton were fined £15,000 by the English Football League after they failed to field a full strength team in each of their EFL Trophy group stage matches, deducted from the £20,000 prize money awarded after their opening two wins in the competition.

Goalkeeper Liam Gooch joined Southern League Premier Division club Hitchin Town on a one-month loan. Hylton scored with a curling shot past goalkeeper Barry Roche to give Luton a 26th-minute lead away to Morecambe before Isaac Vassell doubled the lead on 60 minutes with a close-range header, the match finishing a 2–0 win. Midfielder Arthur Read signed a three-year professional contract with the club. Luton lost 3–1 at home to Portsmouth, despite taking the lead in the seventh minute when Hylton scored with a header. Michael Smith equalised four minutes later with a side-footed shot from 20 yards before Gareth Evans scored shortly before half-time after Luton failed to clear a corner. Kal Naismith scored on 85 minutes to secure a win for the away team. Luton then drew 0–0 away to Exeter City.

=== December ===
Midfielder Alex Atkinson joined Southern League Division One Central club Hanwell Town on a one-month youth loan ahead of the expiration of his contract at the end of December. Luton progressed to the third round of the FA Cup after a 6–2 win at home to Solihull Moors, in which the visitors were 2–0 up at half-time through two first half goals from Jamey Osborne. Hylton brought Luton back into the match on 51 minutes from Marriott's pass, before Johnny Mullins equalised three minutes later. O'Donnell and Marriott both scored twice later in the second half to win the match for Luton. Luton knocked League One club Swindon Town out of the EFL Trophy in the second round with a 3–2 away win. Luke Norris gave the home team a sixth-minute lead, before Josh McQuoid scored twice in 11 minutes to make the score 2–1 to Luton. Swindon equalised in the 63rd minute through Ellis Iandolo, before Vassell scored the winner for Luton six minutes later with a left-footed shot past goalkeeper Will Henry. Gooch was recalled from his loan at Hitchin Town prior to the match, and was named in the matchday squad. Luton drew 1–1 at home to Carlisle United, who took the lead in the fifth minute through Jason Kennedy, before Hylton equalised five minutes later with his 14th goal of the season from Marriott's cross. This was followed by a 2–0 win away to Blackpool, in which Marriott gave Luton the lead in the 31st minute from eight yards, before McGeehan scored a header from six yards three minutes after half-time from Justin's cross.

Striker James Verney joined Southern League Premier Division club Kings Langley on a one-month youth loan. Luton lost 1–0 at home to Colchester United, who scored late in the second half through Craig Slater. Luton's final match of 2016 was a 3–1 win at home to Barnet, in which Sheehan curled a free kick into the top corner from 25 yards in the 31st minute, before Bira Dembélé equalised for Barnet six minutes later with a header. McGeehan restored Luton's lead four minutes into the second half with a volley, before Gilliead finished the scoring for Luton with a shot from 25 yards on 56 minutes.

=== January ===
Luton's first result of 2017 was a 1–0 defeat away to Portsmouth, whose goal came in the 31st minute when Christian Burgess converted Carl Baker's cross with a header. O'Brien left the club by mutual consent, while midfielder Lawson D'Ath was signed from Northampton Town on a one-and-a-half-year contract, with the option of a one-year extension. Luton were knocked out of the FA Cup after losing 2–1 away to Accrington Stanley in the third round, in which the home team took the lead through Sean McConville in first half stoppage time. Gray equalised on 54 minutes after goalkeeper Aaron Chapman saved an attempt on goal from Marriott, before Omar Beckles scored the winner for Accrington three minutes later with a header from eight yards. Luton progressed to the quarter-finals of the EFL Trophy after a 4–0 win at home to Chesterfield in the third round. Mackail-Smith opened the scoring for Luton with a 23rd-minute penalty after he was fouled by Laurence Maguire in the penalty area, before Marriott doubled the lead two minutes later from a tight angle. During the second half, Marriott scored his second goal of the match on 51 minutes with a shot into the bottom corner, before substitute Vassell finished the scoring for Luton with a shot into the roof of the net in the 86th minute. Luton won 2–1 away to Crewe Alexandra, in which the home team took the lead in the 28th minute through Ryan Lowe. Marriott equalised before half-time from a tight angle, before Gray scored the winner for Luton with a side-footed shot on 69 minutes. Luke Gambin, a Malta international, was signed from Barnet on a two-and-a-half-year contract, with the option of a one-year extension, for an undisclosed fee, while McQuoid joined Stevenage on loan until the end of the season.

Luton drew 1–1 away to Wycombe Wanderers, taking the lead on 56 minutes when Scott Cuthbert scored a header before the home team equalised through Adebayo Akinfenwa with a powerful header past goalkeeper Walton in the 82nd minute. Verney's loan at Kings Langley was extended until the end of the season. Luton moved up to fourth place in the table after a 2–0 victory at home to Cambridge United, and took the lead in the 33rd minute through Vassell, before Cook doubled the lead on 82 minutes with a penalty after Vassell was fouled by Leon Legge in the penalty area. Striker Geo Craig joined Isthmian League Premier Division club Hendon on loan until the end of the season. Mackail-Smith joined League One club Peterborough United on loan until the end of the season, before Freddie Hinds joined Championship club Bristol City for an undisclosed fee. Walton was recalled by Brighton & Hove Albion, and was immediately replaced by goalkeepers Stuart Moore and Matt Macey, who joined on loan until the end of 2016–17 from Reading and Arsenal respectively, while striker Ollie Palmer also signed on loan until the end of the season from Leyton Orient. Nathan Doyle's contract with Luton was terminated by mutual consent. Luton lost 3–2 at home to Cheltenham Town, who took the lead in the fifth minute through Will Boyle after a goalkeeping error from Moore. The visitors made it 2–0 in the 28th minute through Jack Barthram, before Vassell brought Luton back into the match four minutes before half-time with a powerful shot. Cheltenham restored their two-goal advantage through Billy Waters in the second half, before Luton recorded a consolation goal after Liam Davis scored an own goal from Lee's free kick on 72 minutes.

=== February ===
Luton drew 1–1 away to Grimsby Town, who took the lead on 56 minutes through Chris Clements, before Vassell equalised for Luton with a header in the 77th minute. The next match saw Luton play Yeovil Town at home in the quarter-final of the EFL Trophy, and took the lead in the 11th minute through Cook with a drilled shot before Sheehan doubled the lead five minutes into the second half with a free kick from 25 yards. François Zoko brought the visitors back into the match on 58 minutes, before Vassell's shot beat goalkeeper Shayon Harrison two minutes later to make the score 3–1. Yeovil scored a consolation goal in the 65th minute through Omar Sowunmi before Hylton scored a tap-in a minute later, and in stoppage time Vassell scored Luton's fifth goal. Luton then played Crawley Town, who took the lead in the 60th minute through James Collins, before Hylton scored twice, the first in the 70th minute from close range, and the second in the 76th minute with a volley into the bottom corner to secure a 2–1 win for Luton. Hylton scored his 18th goal of the season to give Luton a fifth-minute lead at home to Hartlepool United before Gambin doubled the lead on 13 minutes. Palmer finished the scoring in the 81st minute with a close-range shot after the ball had ricocheted back into his path to make the score 3–0. Luton drew 1–1 away to league leaders Doncaster Rovers, and took the lead in the 54th minute through Cook with a powerful shot from the edge of the penalty area, before Alfie May equalised for Doncaster in the 80th minute. Hylton scored his 19th goal of the season to give Luton an eighth-minute lead at home to Plymouth Argyle before Craig Tanner finished the scoring with the equaliser for the visitors in the 25th minute.

=== March ===
Luton were eliminated from the EFL Trophy after being beaten 3–2 at home to Oxford United in the semi-final. Oxford took a two-goal lead through Phil Edwards and a Mpanzu own goal, before Vassell brought Luton back into the match on 72 minutes. Hylton equalised in the 82nd minute with a header for his 20th goal of the season, before Marvin Johnson scored three minutes later to win the match for Oxford. Defender Harry Bean was loaned to Southern League Premier Division club Dunstable Town on a work experience loan until the end of the season, while Gooch joined Southern League Premier Division club Kettering Town on a one-month youth loan. Musonda and Craig King joined National League clubs Braintree Town and Southport respectively on one-month loans. Luton won 4–0 away to Yeovil Town, and took the lead in the seventh minute through Hylton with a penalty after Vassell was fouled by Bevis Mugabi in the penalty area. Hylton doubled the lead on 31 minutes after rounding goalkeeper Artur Krysiak, before Rea scored a header in the 55th minute to make the score 3–0, and Mpanzu finished the scoring with a drilled shot on 85 minutes. Luton lost 2–0 at home to Stevenage, who scored in each half through Luke Wilkinson and Ben Kennedy. This was followed by a 0–0 away draw with Carlisle United, in which Dan Potts was stretchered off injured after a clash of heads. King's loan at Southport was extended to the end of the season.

Luton drew 1–1 at home to Exeter City, with the visitors taking the lead in the 59th minute through Jake Taylor, before Hylton equalised in the 68th minute with a header from Palmer's cross. Luton were held to a 1–1 draw away to Newport County, in which they took the lead on five minutes with a penalty scored by Hylton, before Sean Rigg equalised for Newport in the 28th minute. Verney was recalled from his loan at Kings Langley and he subsequently joined Dunstable Town on loan until the end of the season, while Gooch was recalled from his loan at Kettering Town and he subsequently joined Biggleswade Town on loan until the end of the season. Zane Banton joined National League South club St Albans City on loan until the end of the season. Luton were beaten 2–1 away to Colchester United, who were two goals up by half-time with two goals from Chris Porter. Vassell scored a consolation goal for Luton in second-half stoppage time from close range after Colchester were unable to make a clearance.

=== April ===
Palmer scored a 90th-minute winner for Luton from two yards at home to Blackpool in a 1–0 win, after goalkeeper Dean Lyness failed to hold Gambin's shot. Macey was recalled by Arsenal and King was recalled from his loan at Southport. Lee scored from 12 yards in the 67th minute as Luton won 1–0 away to Barnet to earn their first away win in over a month. Luton drew 2–2 at home to strugglers Leyton Orient, taking the lead in the 33rd minute through Hylton with his 25th goal of the season from Lee's through ball. Liam Kelly equalised for Leyton Orient with a penalty in the 54th minute after Rea handled the ball in the penalty area, before Tristan Abrahams gave the away team the lead seven minutes later after slotting the ball under Moore. Vassell equalised in the 73rd minute with a shot past the advancing goalkeeper, Sam Sargeant. This was followed by a 1–1 away draw with Mansfield Town, who took the lead in the 23rd minute through Alfie Potter after his initial shot was blocked, but followed up for the rebound from 12 yards. Hylton equalised with a penalty in the 51st minute after George Taft handled the ball in the penalty area. Luton then played Notts County, who took the lead in the sixth minute through Elliott Hewitt, before Palmer equalised on 16 minutes with a powerful header past goalkeeper Adam Collin after Hylton hit the crossbar from a 25-yard curling shot. Mpanzu put Luton in the lead in first half stoppage time with a shot into the bottom corner from 18 yards, the match finishing a 2–1 win. Banton was recalled from his loan at St Albans. Justin scored his first professional goal to give Luton a 28th-minute lead away to Accrington Stanley, before the home team equalised six minutes before half-time through Matty Pearson with a header. Omar Beckles scored an own goal early in the second half when his header beat goalkeeper Marek Rodák. Vassell converted Palmer's cross in the 54th minute to make the score 3–1, before Marriott scored Luton's fourth goal in stoppage time.

=== May ===
Luton's last match of the regular season was a 3–1 victory at home to Morecambe, in which they took the lead in the 28th minute through Vassell with a tap-in goal after Potts' header was blocked on the goal line. Morecambe equalised on 58 minutes through Michael Rose with a penalty after Cuthbert fouled Paul Mullin in the penalty area, before Marriott scored twice for Luton later in the second half. The result meant Luton finished the season in fourth-place in League Two, and would play seventh-placed Blackpool in the play-off semi-final. Luton lost 3–2 away to Blackpool, who took the lead in the 19th minute through Mark Cullen with a low shot, before Luton scored twice in two minutes through Potts and Vassell to lead at half-time. Cullen equalised for Blackpool early in the second half with a curling shot from 25 yards, before completing his hat-trick with a penalty in the 67th minute after Cuthbert fouled Tom Aldred in the penalty area. Luton drew 3–3 at home to Blackpool in the second leg, which meant they were eliminated 6–5 on aggregate. Nathan Delfouneso opened the scoring for Blackpool in the 22nd minute, before Luton equalised on 36 minutes through an own goal by Kelvin Mellor, and Cuthbert put Luton in front with a header shortly before half-time. Hylton scored a penalty in the 57th minute to make the score 3–1, before Armand Gnanduillet brought Blackpool back into the match on 76 minutes with a header, and the away team equalised in the fifth minute of stoppage time through an own goal from Moore.

== Competitions ==
=== EFL League Two ===
EFL League Two match details
Date	League position	Opponents	Venue	Result	Score F–A	Scorers	Attendance	Ref.
6 August 2016	1st	Plymouth Argyle	A	W	3–0	Hylton 50', Marriott 69', Smith 90+6'	9,761	
13 August 2016	1st	Yeovil Town	H	D	1–1	O'Donnell 26'	7,800	
16 August 2016	1st	Newport County	H	W	2–1	McGeehan (2) 62' pen., 90+6' pen.	7,058	
20 August 2016	3rd	Stevenage	A	L	1–2	McGeehan 15'	3,517	
27 August 2016	2nd	Cambridge United	A	W	3–0	Coulson 62' o.g., Marriott 63', Hylton 90+6'	5,606	
3 September 2016	1st	Wycombe Wanderers	H	W	4–1	Hylton (3) 10', 56', 88' pen., Cook 90'	8,097	
10 September 2016	3rd	Grimsby Town	H	L	1–2	Rea 59'	8,005	
17 September 2016	7th	Crawley Town	A	L	0–2		2,904	
24 September 2016	3rd	Doncaster Rovers	H	W	3–1	McGeehan (2) 36', 81' pen., Marriott 41'	7,917	
27 September 2016	2nd	Hartlepool United	A	D	1–1	Sheehan 78'	3,533	
1 October 2016	4th	Cheltenham Town	A	D	1–1	Hylton 52'	3,660	
8 October 2016	5th	Crewe Alexandra	H	D	1–1	Hylton 44'	7,716	
15 October 2016	4th	Leyton Orient	A	W	2–1	McGeehan 30', Hylton 74'	5,471	
22 October 2016	4th	Mansfield Town	H	D	1–1	McGeehan 77'	7,787	
29 October 2016	4th	Notts County	A	D	0–0		6,313	
12 November 2016	5th	Accrington Stanley	H	W	1–0	McGeehan 75'	8,008	
19 November 2016	4th	Morecambe	A	W	2–0	Hylton 26', Vassell 60'	1,507	
22 November 2016	5th	Portsmouth	H	L	1–3	Hylton 7'	8,805	
26 November 2016	5th	Exeter City	A	D	0–0		3,823	
10 December 2016	5th	Carlisle United	H	D	1–1	Hylton 10'	7,953	
17 December 2016	5th	Blackpool	A	W	2–0	Marriott 31', McGeehan 48'	3,992	
26 December 2016	5th	Colchester United	H	L	0–1		9,164	
31 December 2016	5th	Barnet	H	W	3–1	Sheehan 31', McGeehan 49', Gilliead 56'	8,262	
2 January 2017	6th	Portsmouth	A	L	0–1		17,402	
14 January 2017	6th	Crewe Alexandra	A	W	2–1	Marriott 45', Gray 69'	4,368	
21 January 2017	6th	Wycombe Wanderers	A	D	1–1	Cuthbert 56'	5,387	
28 January 2017	4th	Cambridge United	H	W	2–0	Vassell 33', Cook 82' pen.	8,917	
31 January 2017	5th	Cheltenham Town	H	L	2–3	Vassell 41', Davis 72' o.g.	6,708	
4 February 2017	5th	Grimsby Town	A	D	1–1	Vassell 77'	5,114	
11 February 2017	4th	Crawley Town	H	W	2–1	Hylton (2) 70', 76'	7,316	
14 February 2017	4th	Hartlepool United	H	W	3–0	Hylton 5', Gambin 13', Palmer 81'	6,965	
18 February 2017	4th	Doncaster Rovers	A	D	1–1	Cook 54'	7,506	
25 February 2017	5th	Plymouth Argyle	H	D	1–1	Hylton 8'	9,124	
4 March 2017	4th	Yeovil Town	A	W	4–0	Hylton (2) 7' pen., 31', Rea 55', Mpanzu 85'	4,194	
11 March 2017	6th	Stevenage	H	L	0–2		9,045	
14 March 2017	5th	Carlisle United	A	D	0–0		4,052	
18 March 2017	5th	Exeter City	H	D	1–1	Hylton 68'	7,657	
21 March 2017	5th	Newport County	A	D	1–1	Hylton 5' pen.	2,304	
25 March 2017	6th	Colchester United	A	L	1–2	Vassell 90+3'	5,445	
1 April 2017	5th	Blackpool	H	W	1–0	Palmer 90'	7,968	
8 April 2017	4th	Barnet	A	W	1–0	Lee 67'	3,313	
14 April 2017	4th	Leyton Orient	H	D	2–2	Hylton 33', Vassell 73'	8,601	
17 April 2017	4th	Mansfield Town	A	D	1–1	Hylton 51' pen.	4,632	
22 April 2017	4th	Notts County	H	W	2–1	Palmer 16', Mpanzu 45+3'	7,791	
29 April 2017	4th	Accrington Stanley	A	W	4–1	Justin 28', Beckles 49' o.g., Vassell 54', Marriott 90+2'	2,150	
6 May 2017	4th	Morecambe	H	W	3–1	Vassell 28', Marriott (2) 74', 86'	8,399	

==== League table ====
Pos	Team	Pld	W	D	L	GF	GA	GD	Pts	Promotion, qualification or relegation
2	Plymouth Argyle (P)	46	26	9	11	71	46	+25	87	Promotion to EFL League One
3	Doncaster Rovers (P)	46	25	10	11	85	55	+30	85	Promotion to EFL League One
4	Luton Town	46	20	17	9	70	43	+27	77	Qualification for League Two play-offs (Note: Four teams play for one spot and promotion to EFL League One)
5	Exeter City	46	21	8	17	75	56	+19	71	Qualification for League Two play-offs
6	Carlisle United	46	18	17	11	69	68	+1	71	Qualification for League Two play-offs

Updated to match(es) played on 6 May 2017. Source: BBC Sport
Rules for classification: 1) Points; 2) Goal difference; 3) Number of goals scored
(P) Promoted

==== Results summary ====
Overall								Home						Away					
Pld	W	D	L	GF	GA	GD	Pts	W	D	L	GF	GA	GD	W	D	L	GF	GA	GD
46	20	17	9	70	43	+27	77	11	7	5	38	26	+12	9	10	4	32	17	+15

=== FA Cup ===
FA Cup match details
Round	Date	Opponents	Venue	Result	Score F–A	Scorers	Attendance	Ref.
First round	5 November 2016	Exeter City	A	W	3–1	Hylton (2) 11' pen., 86' pen., Rea 71'	2,972	
Second round	3 December 2016	Solihull Moors	H	W	6–2	Hylton 51', Mullins 54', O'Donnell (2) 59', 89', Marriott (2) 63', 90+2'	3,512	
Third round	7 January 2017	Accrington Stanley	A	L	1–2	Gray 54'	1,717	

=== EFL Cup ===
EFL Cup match details
Round	Date	Opponents	Venue	Result	Score F–A	Scorers	Attendance	Ref.
First round	10 August 2016	Aston Villa	H	W	3–1	Gray 35', McGeehan 53', Okore 66' o.g.	7,412	
Second round	23 August 2016	Leeds United	H	L	0–1		7,498	

=== EFL Trophy ===
EFL Trophy match details
Round	Date	Opponents	Venue	Result	Score F–A	Scorers	Attendance	Ref.
First round	30 August 2016	Gillingham	A	W	2–1	Musonda 10', Smith 24'	2,128	
First round	4 October 2016	West Bromwich Albion U21	H	W	2–0	Gilliead 60', Gray 62'	1,441	
First round	8 November 2016	Millwall	H	L	1–3	Hutchinson 57' o.g.	2,251	
Second round	6 December 2016	Swindon Town	A	W	3–2	McQuoid (2) 8', 19', Vassell 69'	1,692	
Third round	10 January 2017	Chesterfield	H	W	4–0	Mackail-Smith 23' pen., Marriott (2) 25', 51', Vassell 86'	1,655	
Quarter-final	7 February 2017	Yeovil Town	H	W	5–2	Cook 11', Sheehan 50', Vassell (2) 60', 90+3', Hylton 66'	2,480	
Semi-final	1 March 2017	Oxford United	H	L	2–3	Vassell 72', Hylton 82'	6,901	

==== First round (Southern Section Group H) ====
Pos	Div	Team	Pld	W	PW	PL	L	GF	GA	GD	Pts	Qualification
1	L1	Millwall	3	3	0	0	0	7	2	+5	9	Advance to Round 2
2	L2	Luton Town	3	2	0	0	1	5	4	+1	6	Advance to Round 2
3	L1	Gillingham	3	1	0	0	2	4	4	0	3	
4	ACA	West Bromwich Albion U21	3	0	0	0	3	0	6	−6	0	

Source: Sky Sports

=== League Two play-offs ===
League Two play-offs match details
Round	Date	Opponents	Venue	Result	Score F–A	Scorers	Attendance	Ref.
Semi-final first leg	14 May 2017	Blackpool	A	L	2–3	Potts 26', Vassell 28'	3,882	
Semi-final second leg	18 May 2017	Blackpool	H	D	3–3; 5–6 agg.	Mellor 36' o.g., Cuthbert 45', Hylton 57' pen.	10,032	

== Transfers ==
=== In ===
Date	Player	Club†	Fee	Ref.
1 July 2016	Danny Hylton	(Oxford United)	Free	
1 July 2016	Johnny Mullins	(Oxford United)	Free	
1 July 2016	Glen Rea	Brighton & Hove Albion	Undisclosed	
1 July 2016	Alan Sheehan	(Bradford City)	Free	
5 July 2016	Jordan Cook	(Walsall)	Free	
23 July 2016	Isaac Vassell	(Truro City)	Free	
1 August 2016	Jake Gray	Crystal Palace	Free	
31 August 2016	Jack Senior	Huddersfield Town	Undisclosed	
6 January 2017	Lawson D'Ath	Northampton Town	Undisclosed	
16 January 2017	Luke Gambin	Barnet	Undisclosed	

† Brackets around club names indicate the player's contract with that club had expired before he joined Luton.

=== Out ===
Date	Player	Club†	Fee	Ref.
1 July 2016	Paul Benson	(Dagenham & Redbridge)	Released	
1 July 2016	Isaac Galliford	(Butler Bulldogs)	Released	
1 July 2016	Scott Griffiths		Released	
1 July 2016	Ryan Hall	(Bromley)	Released	
1 July 2016	Jake Howells	(Eastleigh)	Released	
1 July 2016	Elliot Justham	(Dagenham & Redbridge)	Released	
1 July 2016	Alex Lawless	(Yeovil Town)	Released	
1 July 2016	Paddy McCourt	(Glenavon)	Released	
1 July 2016	Mark Onyemah	(Concord Rangers)	Released	
1 July 2016	Matt Robinson	(Dagenham & Redbridge)	Released	
1 July 2016	Luke Trotman	(St Neots Town)	Released	
1 July 2016	Curtley Williams	(Dagenham & Redbridge)	Released	
31 August 2016	Cameron McJannett	Stoke City	Undisclosed	
31 August 2016	Magnus Okuonghae	(Dagenham & Redbridge)	Released	
1 January 2017	Alex Atkinson		Released	
6 January 2017	Mark O'Brien	(Newport County)	Released	
31 January 2017	Freddie Hinds	Bristol City	Undisclosed	
31 January 2017	Nathan Doyle	(Bridlington Town)	Released	
23 June 2017	Cameron McGeehan	Barnsley	Undisclosed	
26 June 2017	Jake Gray	Yeovil Town	Undisclosed	
28 June 2017	Jack Marriott	Peterborough United	Undisclosed	

† Brackets around club names indicate the player joined that club after his Luton contract expired.

=== Loan in ===
Date	Player	Club	Return	Ref.
1 July 2016	Christian Walton	Brighton & Hove Albion	Recalled 31 January 2017	
31 August 2016	Alex Gilliead	Newcastle United	7 January 2017	
31 January 2017	Matt Macey	Arsenal	Recalled 5 April 2017	
31 January 2017	Stuart Moore	Reading	End of season	
31 January 2017	Ollie Palmer	Leyton Orient	End of season	

=== Loan out ===
Date	Player	Club	Return	Ref.
9 September 2016	Mark O'Brien	Southport	10 December 2016	
18 November 2016	Liam Gooch	Hitchin Town	Recalled 6 December 2016	
2 December 2016	Alex Atkinson	Hanwell Town	31 December 2016	
23 December 2016	James Verney	Kings Langley	Recalled 22 March 2017	
19 January 2017	Josh McQuoid	Stevenage	End of season	
30 January 2017	Geo Craig	Hendon	End of season	
31 January 2017	Craig Mackail-Smith	Peterborough United	End of season	
3 March 2017	Harry Bean	Dunstable Town	End of season	
3 March 2017	Liam Gooch	Kettering Town	Recalled 24 March 2017	
3 March 2017	Frankie Musonda	Braintree Town	One-month	
3 March 2017	Craig King	Southport	Recalled 5 April 2017	
22 March 2017	James Verney	Dunstable Town	End of season	
24 March 2017	Zane Banton	St Albans City	Recalled 27 April 2017	
24 March 2017	Liam Gooch	Biggleswade Town	End of season	

== Appearances and goals ==
Numbers in parentheses denote appearances as substitute.
Players with names struck through and marked † left the club during the playing season.
Players with names in italics and marked * were on loan from another club for the whole of their season with Luton.
Players listed with no appearances have been in the matchday squad but only as unused substitutes.
Key to positions: GK – Goalkeeper; DF – Defender; MF – Midfielder; FW – Forward

Players included in matchday squads
No.	Pos.	Nat.	Name	League		FA Cup		EFL Cup		EFL Trophy		Play-offs		Total		Discipline	
No.	Pos.	Nat.	Name	Apps	Goals	Apps	Goals	Apps	Goals	Apps	Goals	Apps	Goals	Apps	Goals	A yellow rectangle, denoting the yellow penalty card shown to a player being cautioned	A red rectangle, denoting the red penalty card shown to a player being sent off
1	GK	ENG	~~Christian Walton~~ * †	27	0	3	0	2	0	1	0	0	0	33	0	1	0
1	GK	ENG	Stuart Moore *	8	0	0	0	0	0	0	0	2	0	10	0	0	0
2	DF	SCO	Stephen O'Donnell	27 (3)	1	0 (3)	2	2	0	4	0	0	0	33 (6)	3	1	0
3	DF	ENG	Dan Potts	22 (1)	0	0 (1)	0	1	0	1	0	2	1	26 (2)	1	5	1
4	MF	ENG	Jonathan Smith	12 (13)	1	1 (1)	0	1 (1)	0	6	1	0	0	20 (15)	2	7	0
5	DF	ENG	Johnny Mullins	21 (2)	0	2	1	2	0	2	0	0	0	27 (2)	1	3	2
6	DF	SCO	Scott Cuthbert	37 (1)	1	3	0	0 (1)	0	0 (2)	0	2	1	42 (4)	2	6	0
7	MF	ENG	Jake Gray	11 (8)	1	1	1	2	1	6	1	0	0	20 (8)	4	0	0
8	MF	NIR	Cameron McGeehan	24	10	2	0	2	1	0	0	0	0	28	11	6	0
9	FW	ENG	Danny Hylton	38 (1)	21	2	3	2	0	2	2	2	1	46 (1)	27	15	2
10	FW	ENG	Jordan Cook	31 (4)	3	2	0	0 (1)	0	3	1	0 (1)	0	36 (6)	4	6	1
12	FW	SCO	Craig Mackail-Smith	0 (2)	0	0 (1)	0	0	0	2 (1)	1	0	0	2 (4)	1	1	0
13	GK	ENG	~~Matt Macey~~ * †	11	0	0	0	0	0	2	0	0	0	13	0	0	0
14	FW	ENG	Jack Marriott	25 (14)	8	1 (1)	2	2	0	1 (2)	2	0 (1)	0	29 (18)	12	1	0
15	FW	ENG	~~Alex Gilliead~~ * †	10 (8)	1	2	0	0	0	1	1	0	0	13 (8)	2	2	0
16	DF	IRL	Glen Rea	36 (3)	2	3	1	2	0	3	0	2	0	46 (3)	3	13	1
17	MF	ENG	Pelly Ruddock Mpanzu	34 (8)	2	1 (1)	0	1 (1)	0	4	0	2	0	42 (10)	2	7	1
18	FW	ENG	Zane Banton	0	0	0	0	0	0	2 (2)	0	0	0	2 (2)	0	1	0
19	MF	ENG	Olly Lee	24 (9)	1	2	0	2	0	1 (1)	0	2	0	31 (10)	1	10	0
20	MF	ENG	Isaac Vassell	22 (18)	8	1 (1)	0	0 (2)	0	5 (2)	5	2	1	30 (23)	14	2	0
21	DF	ENG	Jack Senior	9 (1)	0	0	0	0	0	6	0	0	0	15 (1)	0	3	0
22	MF	MLT	Luke Gambin	8 (8)	1	0	0	0	0	0 (1)	0	0	0	8 (9)	1	2	0
23	FW	NIR	Josh McQuoid	1 (2)	0	1	0	0	0	4	2	0	0	6 (2)	2	2	0
24	MF	ENG	Lawson D'Ath	8 (3)	0	0	0	0	0	0	0	2	0	10 (3)	0	2	0
27	MF	ENG	Tyreeq Bakinson	0	0	0	0	0	0	3 (1)	0	0	0	3 (1)	0	1	0
28	FW	ENG	Ollie Palmer *	4 (13)	3	0	0	0	0	0	0	0 (1)	0	4 (14)	3	1	0
30	MF	ENG	Jack Snelus	0	0	0	0	0	0	0 (1)	0	0	0	0 (1)	0	0	0
31	GK	ENG	Craig King	0	0	0	0	0	0	4	0	0	0	4	0	0	0
32	FW	ENG	~~Freddie Hinds~~ †	0	0	0	0	0	0	0 (2)	0	0	0	0 (2)	0	0	0
33	MF	ENG	Kavan Cotter	0	0	0	0	0	0	1	0	0	0	1	0	0	0
34	DF	ENG	Harry Bean	0	0	0	0	0	0	0	0	0	0	0	0	0	0
35	MF	ENG	Arthur Read	0	0	0	0	0	0	0 (1)	0	0	0	0 (1)	0	0	0
36	DF	ENG	James Justin	24 (5)	1	3	0	1	0	3 (1)	0	2	0	33 (6)	1	2	0
37	DF	ENG	Frankie Musonda	0	0	0	0	0	0	5	1	0	0	5	1	0	0
38	MF	ENG	~~Alex Atkinson~~ †	0	0	0	0	0	0	0 (1)	0	0	0	0 (1)	0	0	0
39	DF	ENG	Akin Famewo	1 (1)	0	0	0	0	0	3	0	0	0	4 (1)	0	1	0
40	FW	ENG	Connor Tomlinson	0	0	0	0	0	0	0 (1)	0	0	0	0 (1)	0	0	0
42	GK	ENG	Liam Gooch	0	0	0	0	0	0	0	0	0	0	0	0	0	0
44	DF	IRL	Alan Sheehan	31 (3)	2	3	0	0	0	2	1	2	0	38 (3)	3	6	1

Players not included in matchday squads
No.	Pos.	Nat.	Name
11	MF	ENG	Danny Green
