= Jack Marriott (footballer) =

English footballer (born 1994)

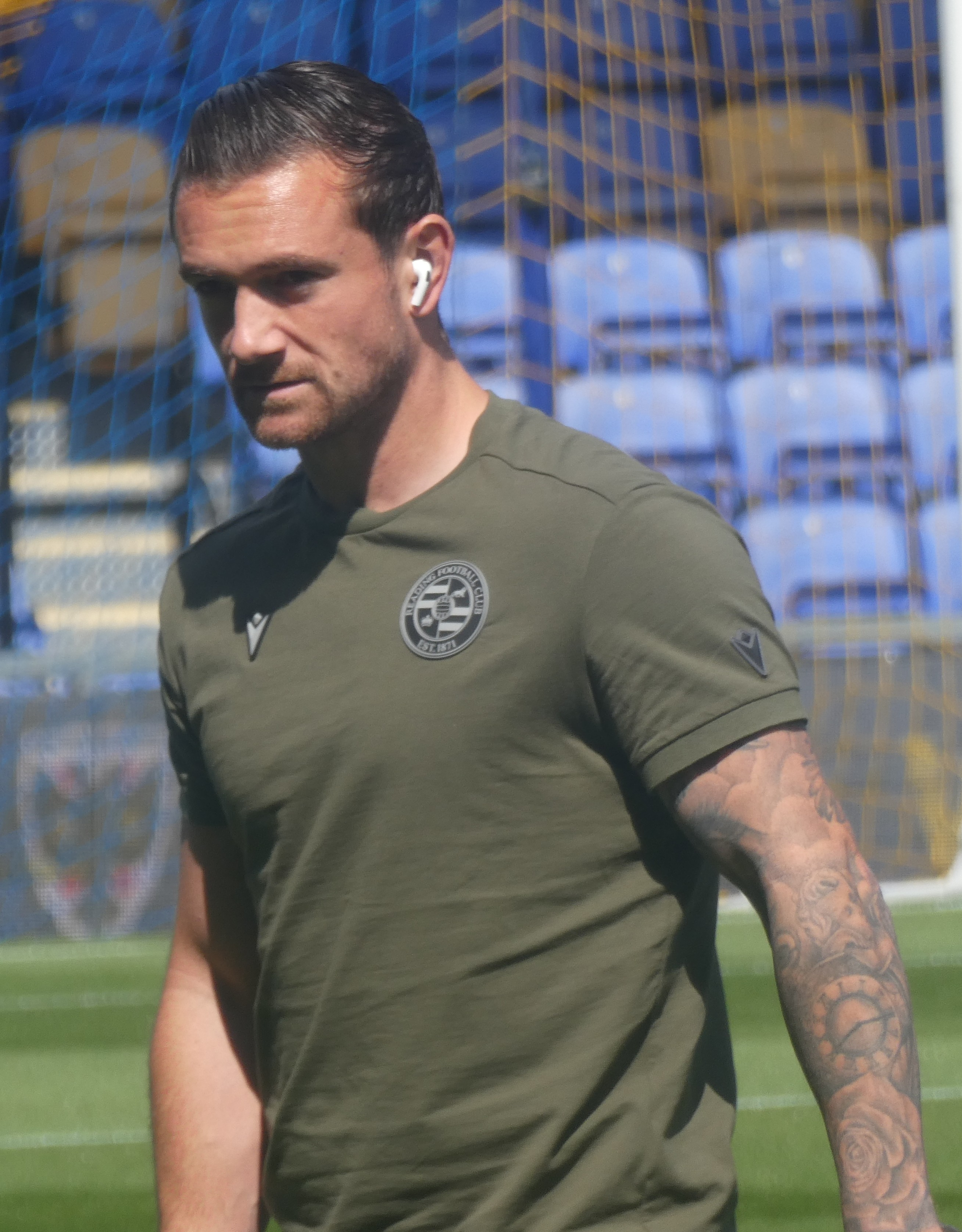
- Marriott in 2026

Personal information
- Full name: Jack David Marriott
- Date of birth: 9 September 1994 (age 32)
- Place of birth: Beverley, England
- Height: 5 ft 8 in (1.73 m)
- Position: Striker

Team information
- Current team: Reading
- Number: 7

Youth career
- 2009–2013: Ipswich Town

Senior career*
Years	Team	Apps	(Gls)
2013–2015	Ipswich Town	2	(0)
2013–2014	→ Woking (loan)	7	(8)
2014	→ Gillingham (loan)	1	(0)
2014	→ Woking (loan)	15	(4)
2014	→ Carlisle United (loan)	4	(0)
2014–2015	→ Woking (loan)	19	(4)
2015	→ Colchester United (loan)	5	(1)
2015–2017	Luton Town	79	(22)
2017–2018	Peterborough United	44	(27)
2018–2021	Derby County	59	(10)
2020–2021	→ Sheffield Wednesday (loan)	12	(0)
2021–2023	Peterborough United	59	(13)
2023–2024	Fleetwood Town	53	(13)
2024–2025	Wrexham	42	(7)
2025–	Reading	34	(25)
- * Club domestic league appearances and goals as of 18 November 2026 (UTC)

Jack David Marriott (born 9 September 1994) is an English professional footballer who plays as a striker for EFL League One club Reading.

Marriott started his career at Ipswich Town, making his debut at the end of the 2012–13 season. Marriott signed on a two-month loan for Woking of the Conference Premier in November 2013, scoring nine goals in nine matches. He returned to Woking on loan in January 2014 after a brief stint at League One club Gillingham.

Marriott went on to sign for Carlisle United on a one-month loan at the start of the 2014–15 season. He returned to Woking on loan for a third spell in September 2014, playing in 24 matches, before ending the 2014–15 campaign at Colchester United of League One. Upon his return to Ipswich, Marriott's contract was not renewed, and he joined League Two club Luton Town in May 2015.

== Club career ==
=== Ipswich Town ===
Born in Beverley, East Riding of Yorkshire, Marriott began his career with the youth system at Ipswich Town aged 15. He later joined the club's under-18 team on a two-year scholarship in April 2011. At the time recruitment officer Malcolm Moore said, "He's a striker, tough, quick, aggressive and has a horrible knack of scoring goals." Impressive performances for the under-18s over his two-year scholarship led to Marriott signing a one-year professional contract at Portman Road in February 2013. Marriott was included in the squad for the final two matches of 2012–13 and made his professional debut as a 61st-minute substitute for Frank Nouble in a 2–0 defeat away to Burnley on 4 May. On 11 December, Marriott signed a new one-and-a-half-year contract with the club.

On 8 November 2013, Marriott joined Conference Premier club Woking on a one-month loan. He made his Woking debut in a 3–0 win at home to Dartford on 12 November, scoring his first professional goal as he picked up the man-of-the-match award. Marriott scored twice in his next match in a 3–2 comeback win over Hyde. He scored his fourth goal in as many matches as he netted in a 3–0 win over Hereford United in the FA Trophy. Marriott scored the first hat-trick of his professional career in the following match; a 4–3 win over FC Halifax Town. On 5 December, it was confirmed that Marriott had extended his loan with Woking by a further month until 2 January 2014, which included a 24-hour recall clause. He finished his loan spell with eight goals in seven league appearances. Marriott then joined League One club Gillingham on loan until the end of the 2013–14 season a day after the expiration of his Woking loan. However, he played in only one match before being recalled by Ipswich four weeks later. He subsequently returned to Woking on loan until the end of the season and scored four goals in 15 league appearances.

Marriott joined League Two club Carlisle United on a one-month loan on 18 August 2014. He made five appearances for the club before returning to Ipswich on 19 September. Marriott then joined Woking on loan for a third spell on 25 September, scoring on his return two days later in a 3–2 defeat at home to Kidderminster Harriers. Marriott was recalled from Woking by Ipswich on 19 January 2015. He then joined League One club Colchester United on loan until the end of the 2014–15 season a day later. Marriott played in five matches, all as a substitute, scoring once. He returned to Ipswich at the end of the season, but was not offered a new contract, and he was subsequently released.

=== Luton Town ===
Marriott signed for League Two club Luton Town on a one-year contract on 20 May 2015. He made his debut as a 76th-minute substitute for Danny Green in a 1–1 draw away to Accrington Stanley on the opening day of 2015–16. Marriott scored his first goals for Luton in the following match, a 3–1 win at home to newly promoted Championship club Bristol City in the League Cup first round. This performance saw him named in the League Cup team of the round. Marriott signed a contract extension with Luton on 25 August until June 2017, with triggers to extend it for a further two years. He was shown a red card for making a gesture to the Leyton Orient fans in Luton's 2–1 win in the Football League Trophy on 1 September. Luton manager John Still, who was adamant he didn't deserve the red card said, "He shouldn't have done it but the punishment didn't fit the crime." Marriott scored a brace in consecutive substitute appearances against AFC Wimbledon and Hartlepool United, which resulted in two wins in a week to increase his tally for the season to six goals. He went on to score twice in 20 appearances, including a goalless drought of 10 matches, before scoring a consolation goal in a 4–1 defeat away to AFC Wimbledon on 13 February 2016. A return to form saw Marriott score four goals in five matches and increased his tally for the season to 12 goals after a 1–0 win away to Leyton Orient on 5 March. Marriott was named Luton Town Player of the Season, voted for by the club's supporters, and joint winner of the Luton Town Young Player of the Season award along with Cameron McGeehan on 1 May, chosen by the Luton Town management team. His fourth brace of 2015–16 in a 4–1 win at home to Exeter City on 7 May saw him finish the season as Luton's top scorer with 16 goals in 44 appearances. Marriott signed a new three-year contract with Luton on 20 July.

Marriott made his first appearance of 2016–17 in the starting lineup away to Plymouth Argyle on the opening day of the season, in which he scored Luton's second goal in a 3–0 victory. He went on to score two further goals in the early months of the season, which included the second goal in a 3–1 victory at home to Doncaster Rovers on 24 September. However, he entered a goalless drought of 10 matches which saw him dropped from the first-team in November against Morecambe, Portsmouth and Exeter City in favour of fellow striker Isaac Vassell. Marriott was recalled to the first-team for a 6–2 victory at home to Solihull Moors in the FA Cup second round on 3 December, in which he scored the fourth and final goals, ensuring Luton's progression to the third round. He scored twice against Chesterfield in the EFL Trophy third round on 10 January 2017 as Luton progressed with a 4–0 home victory. Marriott entered another goalless drought of 16 matches, before scoring Luton's fourth goal in a 4–1 victory away to Accrington Stanley on 29 April, having entered the match as a 73rd-minute substitute, a result that confirmed their place in the play-offs. He was introduced as a 74th-minute substitute in the first leg of the play-off semi-final defeat to Blackpool, losing 6–5 on aggregate, and finished the season with 47 appearances and 12 goals.

=== Peterborough United ===
Marriott signed for League One club Peterborough United on 28 June 2017 on a four-year contract for an undisclosed fee. He made his debut on the opening day of 2017–18 in a 2–1 win at home to Plymouth Argyle. Marriott then scored six goals in three league matches, including a hat-trick in a 4–1 win away to Bristol Rovers on 12 August, and was named the League One Player of the Month for August 2017.

In April 2018, he was nominated for the EFL League One Player of the Season award. He was also named in the EFL League One team of the season. On 18 April, Marriott was named in the PFA Team of the Year for League One.

After scoring 33 goals in 56 appearances in all competitions during the 2017–18 season, on 30 April, at Peterborough United's end of season awards, Marriott won three awards including the Fans Player Of The Year, Players Player of The Year, and the Away Travel Player Of The Year.

=== Derby County ===
Marriott signed for Championship club Derby County on 26 July 2018 on a three-year contract. The fee was undisclosed. He scored his first goal for Derby in an EFL Cup tie against Manchester United at Old Trafford on 25 September 2018. Marriott came on for Duane Holmes in the 44th minute of Derby's playoff clash against Leeds at Elland Road, playing a key role in the match to overturn the deficit, scoring 2 goals to send Derby County through to the 2019 Championship Playoff Final.

==== Sheffield Wednesday (loan) ====
On 16 October 2020, Derby took the opportunity to extend Marriott's contract until the summer of 2022, before allowing him to join Sheffield Wednesday on a season-long loan. Derby revealed in May 2021 that the EFL had withdrawn acceptance of this contract extension in December however, meaning his contract expired in June 2021.

He would make his debut the following day, coming off the bench against Birmingham City. After Tony Pulis first game in charge, he announced that Marriott had a long term calf strain and would be out for 6–7 weeks. He would return from injury, coming off the bench against Everton in the FA Cup and would play four more times for the club after that - all from the bench, with his last outing coming against Norwich City on 14 March. He would finish his loan spell having played 13 games and scoring 0 goals.

=== Return to Peterborough United ===
On 1 July 2021, Peterborough United announced that Marriott had signed a three-year contract with the club.

=== Fleetwood Town ===
On 30 January 2023, Marriott signed for League One club Fleetwood Town on a two-and-a-half-year deal for what was described by his new club as a "substantial undisclosed fee".

=== Wrexham ===
On 1 February 2024, Marriott joined League Two club Wrexham for an undisclosed fee, signing a contract until June 2025.

In January 2025, Marriott signed a new eighteen-month contract.

On 20 August 2025, it was reported that Marriott was in talks with EFL League One club Reading to bring some experience to their forward line, with him being their number one striker target. Marriott scored 6 goals in 9 league appearances during their promotion campaign didn’t feature for Phil Parkinson's side in the Championship.

=== Reading ===
On 26 August 2025, Marriott signed for Reading on a three-year contract. Marriott scored his first goal for the Royals against Swindon Town in the EFL Trophy in a 3-2 defeat at the County Ground. Marriott then went on to score in his next 4 league starts for Reading firstly, in another 3-2 defeat this time away to Barnsley at Oakwell, then in a 2-1 victory against Leyton Orient at home at the Madejski Stadium, next he scored in a 1-1 draw away to Stockport County at Edgeley Park and then in another 1-1 draw this time at home to Mansfield Town at the Madejski Stadium. On 8 October, it was announced that he had been nominated for the EFL League One Player of the Month award for October alongside Devante Cole (Port Vale), Josh Neufville (Bradford City) and Harvey White (Stevenage). He then went on to score against: Exeter City away in a 1-1 draw at St James Park and then missed 5 league matches after the match away to league leaders Cardiff City at the Cardiff City Stadium in a 2-1 defeat where he suffered a hamstring injury, where he missed more seven weeks with, which he returned from in a 2-1 home defeat against one of his former clubs Peterborough United at the Madejski Stadium. He then returned to the scoresheet for the Royals in a 3-2 home win against newly-relegated Luton Town at the Madejski Stadium and then added goals against: another newly-relegated team in Plymouth Argyle at Home Park in a 4-1 victory and Burton Albion in a 2-0 New Year's Day home victory at the Madejski Stadium. He then scored his 9th league goal of the season in a 3-1 away defeat to Leyton Orient at the BetWright Stadium. Marriott scored his first hat-trick for Reading on 14 February 2026, in a 3-2 Valentine's Day victory at home to Wycombe Wanderers F.C..

Following a strong start to the 2026–27 season, Marriott was named EFL League One Player of the Month for September having scored five goals in five matches.

== Career statistics ==
As of match played 14 November 2026

Appearances and goals by club, season and competition
Club	Season	League			FA Cup		League Cup		Other		Total	
Club	Season	Division	Apps	Goals	Apps	Goals	Apps	Goals	Apps	Goals	Apps	Goals
Ipswich Town	2012–13	Championship	1	0	0	0	0	0	—		1	0
Ipswich Town	2013–14	Championship	1	0	0	0	0	0	—		1	0
Ipswich Town	2014–15	Championship	0	0	—		1	0	0	0	1	0
Ipswich Town	Total		2	0	0	0	1	0	0	0	3	0
Woking (loan)	2013–14	Conference Premier	22	12	—		—		2 (Note: Appearances in FA Trophy)	1	24	13
Gillingham (loan)	2013–14	League One	1	0	—		—		—		1	0
Carlisle United (loan)	2014–15	League Two	4	0	—		—		1 (Note: Appearance(s) in Football League Trophy)	0	5	0
Woking (loan)	2014–15	Conference Premier	19	4	2	0	—		3	1	24	5
Colchester United (loan)	2014–15	League One	5	1	—		—		—		5	1
Luton Town	2015–16	League Two	40	14	1	0	1	2	2	0	44	16
Luton Town	2016–17	League Two	39	8	2	2	2	0	4 (Note: Three appearances and two goals in EFL Trophy, one appearance in League Two play-offs)	2	47	12
Luton Town	Total		79	22	3	2	3	2	6	2	91	28
Peterborough United	2017–18	League One	44	27	6	5	1	0	5	1	56	33
Derby County	2018–19	Championship	33	7	3	1	4	2	3 (Note: Appearances in Championship play-offs)	3	43	13
Derby County	2019–20	Championship	32	2	3	1	2	0	—		37	3
Derby County	2020–21	Championship	4	1	0	0	2	0	—		6	1
Derby County	Total		69	10	6	2	8	2	3	3	86	17
Sheffield Wednesday (loan)	2020–21	Championship	12	0	1	0	—		—		13	0
Peterborough United	2021–22	Championship	28	9	2	0	0	0	—		30	9
Peterborough United	2022–23	League One	21	4	3	2	1	0	3	1	28	7
Peterborough United	Total		49	13	5	2	1	0	3	1	58	16
Fleetwood Town	2022–23	League One	19	8	—		—		—		19	8
Fleetwood Town	2023–24	League One	24	5	2	0	1	0	2	0	29	5
Fleetwood Town	Total		43	13	2	0	1	0	2	0	48	13
Wrexham	2023–24	League Two	17	1	0	0	0	0	0	0	17	1
Wrexham	2024–25	League One	25	6	0	0	1	0	3	0	29	6
Wrexham	2025–26	Championship	0	0	0	0	1	0	—		1	0
Wrexham	Total		42	7	0	0	2	0	3	0	47	7
Reading	2025–26	League One	24	16	0	0	0	0	1	1	25	17
Reading	2026–27	League One	10	9	1	1	1	0	0	0	12	10
Reading	Total		34	25	1	1	1	0	1	1	37	27
Career total			425	134	26	12	18	4	29	10	498	160

== Honours ==
Wrexham

- EFL League One runner up: 2024-25
- EFL League Two runner-up: 2023–24

Individual

- Ipswich Town Young Player of the Year: 2012–13
- Football League Cup Team of the Round: 2015–16 First round
- Luton Town Player of the Season: 2015–16
- Luton Town Young Player of the Season: 2015–16
- EFL League One Player of the Month: August 2017, September 2026
- EFL League One top scorer: 2017–18
- PFA Team of the Year: 2017–18 League One
- Peterborough United Player of the Year: 2017–18
- Peterborough United Players' Player of the Year: 2017–18
