= Connor Tomlinson (footballer) =

Association football player (born 2001)

Personal information
- Full name: Connor Alexander Tomlinson
- Date of birth: 12 February 2001 (age 25)
- Place of birth: Luton, England
- Position: Striker

Team information
- Current team: Corby Town

Youth career
- –2016: Luton Town

Senior career*
Years	Team	Apps	(Gls)
2016–2019	Luton Town	0	(0)
2018–2019	→ Hemel Hempstead Town (loan)	4	(0)
2019–2023	Bedford Town	59	(25)
2023-2024	Nuneaton Borough	6	(0)
2023	→ Bedford Town (Loan)	5	(3)
2023	→ Corby Town (Loan)		
2024-2025	Barwell		
2025-	Corby Town		
- * Club domestic league appearances and goals as of 10:23, 19 September 2025 (UTC)

Connor Alexander Tomlinson (born 12 February 2001) is an English semi-professional footballer who plays as a striker for Northern Premier League Division One Midlands side Corby Town.

== Early and personal life ==
Tomlinson was born in Luton, Bedfordshire and attended Harlington Upper School. He is the son of former footballer Graeme Tomlinson.

== Career ==
=== Luton Town ===
Tomlinson became the youngest player to make a first-team appearance for Luton Town at 15 years and 199 days old when he was introduced as a 92nd-minute substitute for Zane Banton in a 2–1 away win over Gillingham in an EFL Trophy group stage match on 30 August 2016. He signed scholarship terms with the club in the summer of 2017. Tomlinson joined National League South club Hemel Hempstead Town on 14 December 2018 on a one-month youth loan. He was released by Luton at the end of his scholarship.

=== Bedford Town ===
Tomlinson signed for Southern League Division One Central club Bedford Town on 16 July 2019 on a two-year contract. He made 32 appearances and scored seven goals in all competitions before the 2019–20 season was abandoned and results expunged because of the COVID-19 pandemic in England. Tomlinson signed a new two-year contract in May 2022.

== Career statistics ==
As of match played 25 October 2022

Appearances and goals by club, season and competition
Club	Season	League			FA Cup		EFL Cup		Other		Total	
Club	Season	Division	Apps	Goals	Apps	Goals	Apps	Goals	Apps	Goals	Apps	Goals
Luton Town	2016–17	League Two	0	0	0	0	0	0	1 (Note: Appearance in EFL Trophy)	0	1	0
Luton Town	2017–18	League Two	0	0	0	0	0	0	0	0	0	0
Luton Town	2018–19	League One	0	0	0	0	0	0	1	0	1	0
Luton Town	Total		0	0	0	0	0	0	2	0	2	0
Hemel Hempstead Town (loan)	2018–19	National League South	4	0	—		—		1 (Note: Appearance(s) in FA Trophy)	0	5	0
Bedford Town	2020–21	Southern League Division One Central	7	1	1	0	—		3	0	11	1
Bedford Town	2021–22	Southern League Division One Central	38	18	4	0	—		11 (Note: Four appearances and one goal in FA Trophy, two appearances and one goal in Southern League Cup, four appearances and one goal in Bedfordshire Senior Cup, one appearance in Southern League Division One Champions vs Champions)	3	53	21
Bedford Town	2022–23	Southern League Premier Division Central	14	6	2	0	—		0	0	16	6
Bedford Town	Total		59	25	7	0	—		14	3	80	28
Career total			63	25	7	0	0	0	17	3	87	28
