= Frankie Musonda =

Zambian football player (born 1997)

Personal information
- Full name: Frankie Chisenga Musonda
- Date of birth: 12 December 1997 (age 28)
- Place of birth: Bedford, England
- Height: 6 ft 0 in (1.83 m)
- Position: Defender

Team information
- Current team: Ayr United
- Number: 4

Youth career
- 2006–2015: Luton Town

Senior career*
Years	Team	Apps	(Gls)
2015–2020	Luton Town	14	(0)
2017	→ Braintree Town (loan)	3	(0)
2018	→ Oxford City (loan)	12	(1)
2018	→ Oxford City (loan)	5	(1)
2019	→ Hemel Hempstead Town (loan)	11	(2)
2019–2020	→ St Albans City (loan)	11	(1)
2020	→ St Albans City (loan)	2	(0)
2020–2022	Raith Rovers	48	(3)
2022–	Ayr United	59	(4)

International career^{‡}
2022–	Zambia	17	(1)
- * Club domestic league appearances and goals as of 11 June 2025 ‡ National team caps and goals as of 17:31, 25 March 2022 (UTC)

Frankie Chisenga Musonda (born 12 December 1997) is a professional footballer who plays as a defender. Born in England, he plays for the Zambia national team.

== Career ==
=== Luton Town and loan spells ===
Born in Bedford, Bedfordshire, Musonda Chisenga joined Luton Town in 2006 aged eight and progressed through the club's youth system. During his time in the club's academy he played in numerous positions, including as a striker, before settling on a central defensive role. He was part of the under-11 team which defeated Bayern Munich 3–2 to win the Aarau Masters in 2009. Musonda was promoted to Luton's under-18 team as a first year scholar in 2014 and was named captain. He began 2015–16 playing for both the under-18 team and the development squad alongside senior professionals. After leading the under-18's on a 16-match unbeaten run, during which the team conceded only seven goals, he signed a one-and-a-half-year professional contract with Luton on 4 November 2015. Musonda continued to captain the under-18 team which went on to win the Youth Alliance South East title and the Youth Alliance Cup, and also reached the quarter-finals of the FA Youth Cup, in which they lost 1–0 to Blackburn Rovers.

Musonda first became involved with the Luton first-team when he was named on the bench on his eighteenth birthday for a League Two match against Northampton Town, though he remained an unused substitute. On 23 January 2016, Musonda was introduced as a 94th-minute substitute for Pelly Ruddock Mpanzu in a 2–0 win away to Mansfield Town to make his professional debut. He made his second appearance of the season on 9 April, coming on as an 85th-minute substitute for Dan Potts in a 2–0 defeat at home to Accrington Stanley. Musonda was introduced as an 89th-minute substitute for Jake Howells in Luton's final match of the season, a 4–1 win at home to Exeter City.

Musonda scored his first professional goal on his first appearance of 2016–17 in a 2–1 win away to Gillingham in the EFL Trophy on 30 August 2016. He made four further appearances in the EFL Trophy, before joining National League club Braintree Town on 3 March 2017 on an initial one-month loan. Having made his debut a day later in a 2–1 home defeat to Wrexham, Musonda finished his loan spell at Braintree with three appearances.

Shortly after the start of 2017–18, Musonda signed a new contract with Luton on 9 August 2017 to keep him at the club until the summer of 2019, with the option of a further year. He joined National League South club Oxford City on 9 February 2018 on a one-month youth loan and made his debut after starting in a 4–1 home win over Hemel Hempstead Town a day later. The loan was extended on 16 March until the end of the season. Musonda made 13 appearances and scored one goal as Oxford finished 16th in the National League South. His contract with Luton was extended by a further year at the end of the season after a promotion clause was triggered as a result of the club's promotion to League One. He rejoined Oxford City on 26 October 2018 on loan for a month. Musonda's second loan spell with Oxford ended having scored one goal from seven appearances. He was loaned to another National League South club, Hemel Hempstead Town, on 9 January 2019 until the end of 2018–19.

Musonda joined St Albans City of the National League South on 18 October 2019 on loan until January 2020. His debut came a day later in a 1–0 home defeat to Bath City and made 12 further appearances, completing the loan with 13 appearances and one goal before returning to Luton. He returned to St Albans on 6 March 2020 on loan until the end of the season. Musonda was released by Luton when his contract expired in June 2020.

=== Raith Rovers ===
Musonda signed for newly promoted Scottish Championship club Raith Rovers on 11 August 2020 on a one-year contract.

=== Ayr United ===
On 22 June 2022, Musonda joined Scottish Championship side Ayr United on a two-year deal.

== International career ==
Musonda was born in England to a Zambian father and English mother. He was called up to represent the Zambia national team in March 2022. He debuted for Zambia in a friendly 3–1 win over the Congo on 25 March 2022, scoring his side's third goal on his debut.

On 10 December 2025, Musonda was called up to the Zambia squad for the 2025 Africa Cup of Nations.

== Career statistics ==
=== Club ===
As of match played 4 December 2021

Appearances and goals by club, season and competition
Club	Season	League			National Cup		League Cup		Other		Total	
Club	Season	Division	Apps	Goals	Apps	Goals	Apps	Goals	Apps	Goals	Apps	Goals
Luton Town	2015–16	League Two	3	0	0	0	0	0	0	0	3	0
Luton Town	2016–17	League Two	0	0	0	0	0	0	5 (Note: Appearances in EFL Trophy)	1	5	1
Luton Town	2017–18	League Two	0	0	0	0	0	0	4	0	4	0
Luton Town	2018–19	League One	0	0	—		0	0	2	0	2	0
Luton Town	2019–20	Championship	0	0	0	0	0	0	—		0	0
Luton Town	Total		3	0	0	0	0	0	11	1	14	1
Braintree Town (loan)	2016–17	National League	3	0	—		—		—		3	0
Oxford City (loan)	2017–18	National League South	12	1	—		—		1 (Note: Appearance in Oxfordshire Senior Cup)	0	13	1
Oxford City (loan)	2018–19	National League South	5	1	2	0	—		—		7	1
Oxford City (loan)	Total		20	2	2	0	—		1	0	23	2
Hemel Hempstead Town (loan)	2018–19	National League South	11	2	—		—		2 (Note: Appearances in FA Trophy)	0	13	2
St Albans City (loan)	2019–20	National League South	13	1	—		—		3 (Note: One appearance in Herts Charity Cup, one in FA Trophy, one in Herts Senior Cup)	0	16	1
Raith Rovers	2020–21	Scottish Championship	22	3	2	0	2	0	—		26	3
Raith Rovers	2021–22	Scottish Championship	18	0	3	0	0	0	1	0	22	0
Raith Rovers	Total		87	3	7	0	2	0	1	0	48	3
Ayr United	2022−23	Scottish Championship	30	2	1	0	5	0	0	0	0	0
Career total			110	10	8	0	6	0	18	1	142	10

=== International ===
As of match played 19 November 2024

Appearances and goals by national team and year
National team	Year	Apps	Goals
Zambia	2022	6	1
Zambia	2023	4	0
Zambia	2024	9	0
Total		19	1

Scores and results list Zambia's goal tally first, score column indicates score after each Musonda goal.

List of international goals scored by Frankie Musonda
No.	Date	Venue	Opponent	Score	Result	Competition	Ref.
1	25 March 2022	Mardan Sports Complex, Aksu, Turkey	Congo	3–1	3–1	Friendly	

== Honours ==
Raith Rovers

- Scottish Challenge Cup: 2021–22
