= Zane Banton =

English semi-professional footballer

Personal information
- Full name: Zane Banton
- Date of birth: 23 May 1996 (age 30)
- Place of birth: Stevenage, England
- Height: 5 ft 8 in (1.73 m)
- Position: Striker

Team information
- Current team: St Albans City
- Number: 11

Youth career
- Watford
- –2013: Luton Town

Senior career*
Years	Team	Apps	(Gls)
2013–2017	Luton Town	5	(0)
2014	→ Concord Rangers (loan)	3	(0)
2014	→ Biggleswade Town (loan)	16	(4)
2014	→ Hemel Hempstead Town (loan)	4	(0)
2015	→ Hemel Hempstead Town (loan)	19	(3)
2015	→ Boreham Wood (loan)	2	(0)
2015–2016	→ Hemel Hempstead Town (loan)	5	(0)
2017	→ St Albans City (loan)	6	(2)
2017–	St Albans City	317	(67)
- * Club domestic league appearances and goals as of 11:40, 20 September 2025 (UTC)

Zane Banton (born 23 May 1996) is an English semi-professional footballer who plays as a striker for Isthmian League Premier Division club St Albans City.

== Career ==
=== Luton Town ===
Born in Stevenage, Hertfordshire, Banton became a first-year scholar at Luton Town in July 2012, having previously been at Watford. During his first year as a scholar, he scored 16 goals for the under-18 team as they finished third in the Youth Alliance South East Conference. The following season, Banton signed a professional contract on 19 September 2013 until May 2015. He made his first-team debut five days later aged 17 as an 85th-minute substitute for Andre Gray in a 4–0 win over Woking. His first start came on 30 November in a 0–0 draw with Staines Town in the FA Trophy first round, before being substituted in the 60th minute. Banton joined Conference South club Concord Rangers on a one-month loan on 5 March 2014. At the time, Luton manager John Still said he hoped Banton's loan spell would help to aid his development and "might push him on a little bit". He debuted two days later in a 3–2 win over Eastleigh and completed the loan spell with three appearances.

On 8 August 2014, Banton joined Southern League Premier Division club Biggleswade Town on a three-month loan. He made his debut a day later as a 69th-minute substitute in a 2–0 defeat to Chippenham Town. Banton scored his first goal for Biggleswade in a 4–1 win over Dorchester Town on 23 August. He added a second goal to his Biggleswade tally in a 1–0 win over Burnham on 9 September. Banton scored in three consecutive matches in all competitions from September to October and made his final appearance for Biggleswade in a 3–3 draw with Slough Town on 28 October. He finished the loan spell with six goals from 21 appearances. Banton was recalled from his loan at Biggleswade on 31 October, and joined Conference South club Hemel Hempstead Town later that day on loan until 29 November. He debuted in a 1–0 win over Bromley on 11 November. Banton made four further appearances in all competitions and scored the winning goal in a 2–1 win over Truro City in the FA Trophy third qualifying round on 29 November. He rejoined Hemel Hempstead Town on loan until the end of the season at the beginning of January 2015.

On 21 September 2015, Banton joined National League club Boreham Wood on a one-month loan. He debuted in a 2–1 win away to Torquay United and completed the loan spell with two appearances. Banton later rejoined Hemel Hempstead Town on a one-month youth loan until 9 January 2016, starting in a 2–1 defeat at home to Ebbsfleet United on 5 December. In the following match, Banton scored in a 7–4 defeat away to Eastbourne Borough in the FA Trophy on 12 December. Banton's loan was extended for a second month on 13 January 2016 until 14 February, with an immediate recall option. Luton exercised the option to recall Banton on 30 January with immediate effect to allow him to be named on the bench for the match at home to Notts County, which finished as a 2–0 defeat. Banton made his Football League debut as a 73rd-minute substitute for Jonathan Smith in a 2–0 defeat at home to Accrington Stanley on 9 April. This was followed up with three further substitute appearances, and finished 2015–16 with four appearances for Luton. Banton signed a new one-year contract after the end of the season, with the option of a one-year extension.

=== St Albans City ===
On 24 March 2017, Banton joined National League South club St Albans City on loan until the end of 2016–17. He debuted a day later in a 1–0 win at home to Dartford. Banton scored his first goal for St Albans on 15 April in a 1–1 draw with Whitehawk, and this was followed up with a goal in the following match, a 3–0 victory at home to Weston-super-Mare. He was recalled by Luton on 27 April, having scored twice in six appearances for St Albans. Banton was released by Luton when his contract expired at the end of 2016–17.

Banton joined St Albans permanently on a one-year contract on 2 June 2017. He signed a new contract for 2018–19 in May 2018.

== Career statistics ==
As of match played 3 October 2020

Appearances and goals by club, season and competition
Club	Season	League			FA Cup		League Cup		Other		Total	
Club	Season	Division	Apps	Goals	Apps	Goals	Apps	Goals	Apps	Goals	Apps	Goals
Luton Town	2013–14	Conference Premier	1	0	1	0	—		7 (Note: Four appearances in FA Trophy, three appearances and three goals in Bedfordshire Senior Cup)	3	9	3
Luton Town	2014–15	League Two	0	0	—		0	0	0	0	0	0
Luton Town	2015–16	League Two	4	0	0	0	0	0	0	0	4	0
Luton Town	2016–17	League Two	0	0	0	0	0	0	4 (Note: Appearances in EFL Trophy)	0	4	0
Luton Town	Total		5	0	1	0	0	0	11	3	17	3
Concord Rangers (loan)	2013–14	Conference South	3	0	—		—		—		3	0
Biggleswade Town (loan)	2014–15	Southern League Premier Division	16	4	4	2	—		1 (Note: Appearance in Southern League Cup)	0	21	6
Hemel Hempstead Town (loan)	2014–15	Conference South	23	3	—		—		5 (Note: Three appearances and one goal in FA Trophy, two appearances and one goal in St Mary's Cup)	2	28	5
Boreham Wood (loan)	2015–16	National League	2	0	—		—		—		2	0
Hemel Hempstead Town (loan)	2015–16	National League South	5	0	—		—		1 (Note: Appearance in FA Trophy)	1	6	1
St Albans City (loan)	2016–17	National League South	6	2	—		—		—		6	2
St Albans City	2017–18	National League South	38	9	4	2	—		5 (Note: One appearance and one goal in Herts Charity Cup, two appearances and one goal in Herts Senior Cup, two appearances and one goal in FA Trophy)	3	47	14
St Albans City	2018–19	National League South	29	7	1	0	—		6 (Note: One appearance and one goal in Herts Charity Cup, two appearances in FA Trophy, three in Herts Senior Cup)	1	36	8
St Albans City	2019–20	National League South	26	5	3	1	—		4 (Note: One appearance in Herts Charity Cup, two in Herts Senior Cup, one appearance and one goal in FA Trophy)	1	33	7
St Albans City	2020–21	National League South	0	0	1	1	—		0	0	1	1
St Albans City	Total		99	23	9	4	—		15	5	123	32
Career total			153	30	14	6	0	0	33	11	200	47

== Honours ==
Luton Town

- Conference Premier: 2013–14
