= Elliot Justham =

Footballer

Personal information
- Full name: Elliot Justham
- Date of birth: 18 July 1990 (age 36)
- Place of birth: Dagenham, England
- Height: 6 ft 3 in (1.91 m)
- Position: Goalkeeper

Team information
- Current team: Maldon & Tiptree

Youth career
- AFC Hornchurch

Senior career*
| Years | Team | Apps | (Gls) |
| 2008–2009 | Waltham Forest | 11 | (0) |
| 2009–2010 | Leyton | | |
| 2010–2011 | Redbridge | 25 | (1) |
| 2011–2012 | Brentwood Town | | |
| 2012–2013 | East Thurrock United | 30 | (0) |
| 2013–2016 | Luton Town | 30 | (0) |
| 2016–2025 | Dagenham & Redbridge | 327 | (0) |
| 2025– | Maldon & Tiptree | 1 | (0) |

International career
| 2024 | England C | 2 | (0) |
- * Club domestic league appearances and goals as of 18:45, 16 February 2025 (UTC)

Elliot Justham (born 18 July 1990) is an English professional footballer who plays as a goalkeeper for Isthmian League Premier Division club Maldon & Tiptree.

== Career ==
=== Early career ===
Born in Dagenham, Greater London, Justham played for semi-professional clubs Waltham Forest, Leyton, Redbridge, Brentwood Town and East Thurrock United between 2008 and 2013, alongside working night shifts on the London Underground. His potential was spotted by clubs higher up the footballing pyramid and he went on trial at both Reading and West Ham United.

=== Luton Town ===
On 13 May 2013, Justham was signed by Conference Premier club Luton Town on a two-year contract. He spent his first season as Luton's goalkeeper in cup competitions, playing twice in the FA Cup, five times in the FA Trophy and three times in the Bedfordshire Senior Cup including a 2–1 defeat to Biggleswade Town in the final, without making a league appearance. An injury to regular goalkeeper Mark Tyler resulted in Justham playing the final 15 matches of 2014–15. He kept five clean sheets and his performances saw reported interest from League One clubs Bradford City and Gillingham. Justham signed a two-year contract extension with Luton on 23 April 2015.

Justham made his first appearance of 2015–16 in the starting lineup away to Accrington Stanley on the opening day of the season, which finished as a 1–1 draw. He made his first league appearance since August after a back injury to Mark Tyler saw him introduced as an eighth-minute substitute at home to Cambridge United on 16 January 2016, which finished as a 0–0 draw in Nathan Jones' first match as manager. Justham had a prolonged run in the first-team as a result of Tyler's injury, making six successive appearances, until Tyler returned to the team for a 2–1 win at home to Hartlepool United on 20 February. Following Tyler's departure from Luton, manager Jones opted to sign Jonathan Mitchell on loan until the end of the season, which resulted in Justham remaining second-choice goalkeeper. After Derby recalled Mitchell from his loan, Justham played in the final seven matches and finished the season with 17 appearances. He was released by mutual consent after the end of the season despite having one year remaining on his contract.

=== Dagenham & Redbridge ===
Justham signed a two-year contract with newly relegated National League club Dagenham & Redbridge on 31 May 2016. He debuted on the opening day of 2016–17 in a 3–0 win at home to Southport. He signed a new two-year contract with the club in May 2019.

In July 2023, Justham was named club captain by manager Ben Strevens.

On 7 February 2025, Justham departed the club by mutual consent. In recognition for his contribution to the club, he was granted a testimonial match.

=== Maldon & Tiptree ===
On 11 February 2025, Justham joined Isthmian League Premier Division side Maldon & Tiptree on a "long-term contract".

== International career ==
Justham was called up to represent the England C team in March 2024. On 19 March, he made his debut in the 1–0 defeat to the Wales C team at Stebonheath Park.

== Career statistics ==
As of match played 15 February 2025

Appearances and goals by club, season and competition
| Club | Season | League | | | FA Cup | | League Cup | | Other | | Total | |
| Club | Season | Division | Apps | Goals | Apps | Goals | Apps | Goals | Apps | Goals | Apps | Goals |
|---|---|---|---|---|---|---|---|---|---|---|---|---|
| Redbridge | 2010–11 | Isthmian League Division One North | 25 | 1 | — | | — | | 2 (Note: One appearance in Essex Senior Cup, one in London Senior Cup) | 0 | 27 | 1 |
| East Thurrock United | 2012–13 | Isthmian League Premier Division | 30 | 0 | — | | — | | — | | 30 | 0 |
| Luton Town | 2013–14 | Conference Premier | 0 | 0 | 2 | 0 | — | | 8 (Note: Five appearances in FA Trophy, three in Bedfordshire Senior Cup) | 0 | 10 | 0 |
| Luton Town | 2014–15 | League Two | 15 | 0 | 0 | 0 | 0 | 0 | 1 (Note: Appearance in Football League Trophy) | 0 | 16 | 0 |
| Luton Town | 2015–16 | League Two | 15 | 0 | 1 | 0 | 1 | 0 | 0 | 0 | 17 | 0 |
| Luton Town | Total | | 30 | 0 | 3 | 0 | 1 | 0 | 9 | 0 | 43 | 0 |
| Dagenham & Redbridge | 2016–17 | National League | 43 | 0 | 0 | 0 | — | | 0 | 0 | 43 | 0 |
| Dagenham & Redbridge | 2017–18 | National League | 0 | 0 | 0 | 0 | — | | 0 | 0 | 0 | 0 |
| Dagenham & Redbridge | 2018–19 | National League | 45 | 0 | 2 | 0 | — | | 1 (Note: Appearance in FA Trophy) | 0 | 48 | 0 |
| Dagenham & Redbridge | 2019–20 | National League | 37 | 0 | 1 | 0 | — | | 1 | 0 | 39 | 0 |
| Dagenham & Redbridge | 2020–21 | National League | 42 | 0 | 3 | 0 | — | | 2 | 0 | 47 | 0 |
| Dagenham & Redbridge | 2021–22 | National League | 44 | 0 | 2 | 0 | — | | 4 | 0 | 50 | 0 |
| Dagenham & Redbridge | 2022–23 | National League | 42 | 0 | 4 | 0 | — | | 2 | 0 | 48 | 0 |
| Dagenham & Redbridge | 2023–24 | National League | 46 | 0 | 1 | 0 | — | | 1 | 0 | 48 | 0 |
| Dagenham & Redbridge | 2024–25 | National League | 28 | 0 | 4 | 0 | — | | 0 | 0 | 32 | 0 |
| Dagenham & Redbridge | Total | | 327 | 0 | 17 | 0 | — | | 11 | 0 | 355 | 0 |
| Maldon & Tiptree | 2024–25 | Isthmian League Premier Division | 1 | 0 | 0 | 0 | — | | 0 | 0 | 1 | 0 |
| Career total | | | 413 | 1 | 20 | 0 | 1 | 0 | 22 | 0 | 456 | 1 |

== Honours ==
Luton Town

- Conference Premier: 2013–14
