= 2015–16 Luton Town F.C. season =

English football club season

Luton Town
2015–16 season
- Owner: Luton Town Football Club 2020 Limited
- Chairman: Nick Owen
- Manager: John Still (until 17 December 2015); Andy Awford (caretaker manager until 6 January 2016); Nathan Jones (from 6 January 2016)
- Stadium: Kenilworth Road
- League Two: 11th
- FA Cup: Second round
- League Cup: Second round
- Football League Trophy: Second round
- Top goalscorer: League: Jack Marriott (14); All: Jack Marriott (16)
- Highest home attendance: 9,676 vs Wycombe Wanderers, League Two, 26 December 2015
- Lowest home attendance: 1,953 vs Leyton Orient, Football League Trophy, 1 September 2015
- Average home league attendance: 8,554
Home colours	Away colours

The 2015–16 season was the 130th in the history of Luton Town Football Club and the club's 90th season in the Football League. Following their eighth-place finish the previous year, Luton were contesting the season in League Two.

== Key events ==
- 2 June: Luton confirm they have agreed an undisclosed "six-figure" transfer fee for Norwich City midfielder Cameron McGeehan, who will join the club on a two-year contract on 1 July.
- 30 June: Mark Cullen, the club's top scorer in the previous season, joins League One side Blackpool for £180,000.
- 1 August: Former Brighton & Hove Albion forward Craig Mackail-Smith signs a two-year contract with Luton after being on trial with the club for over a month.
- 8 August: Luton begin their 2015–16 campaign with a 1–1 draw away to Accrington Stanley.
- 24 August: Luton are knocked out of the League Cup at the second round, losing 8–7 in a penalty shootout to Premier League side Stoke City after the game finished 1–1 at extra time.
- 24 August: Following Brentford's sale of former Luton striker Andre Gray to Burnley, Luton confirm that they will receive £1.1 million in sell-on fees spread over three seasons. Additionally, Luton reveal that if Burnley win promotion to the Premier League with Gray in the side, the club would be due a further £700,000. The potential total value of Gray's transfer, including the fee Brentford paid in June 2014, makes this one of the most lucrative transfers in Luton Town history.
- 25 August: Striker Jack Marriott signs a new contract to keep him at Luton until the summer of 2017, with the option of extending his deal until 2019.
- 30 August: Luton's Managing Director Gary Sweet confirms the club is in the final process of buying a 40-acre (160,000 m^{2}) plot of land near Junction 10a of the M1 for £10 million to potentially house a new stadium, or to act as an enabling development to a stadium elsewhere in Luton.
- 5 September: Luton win their first league game of the season at the sixth time of asking, beating Cambridge United 3–1 at the Abbey Stadium.
- 22 September: After impressing in his first six games for the club, midfielder Olly Lee signs an extended contract with Luton until June 2017.
- 3 October: Luton record their biggest Football League away victory since March 2005, winning 4–1 at Hartlepool United to lift the club to tenth in the table.
- 6 October: Luton are knocked out of the Football League Trophy at the second round following a 2–1 away loss to League One side Gillingham.

== Club ==
=== Current squad ===
Squad No.	Name	Nationality	Position(s)	Since	Date of birth (age)	Signed from
Goalkeepers
1	Mark Tyler	(England)	GK	2009	2 May 1977 (age 49)	(England) Peterborough United
16	Elliot Justham	(England)	GK	2013	18 August 1990 (age 36)	(England) East Thurrock United
31	Craig King	(England)	GK	2015		(England) Luton Town Academy
Defenders
2	Stephen O'Donnell	(Scotland)	RB / RW	2015	11 May 1992 (age 34)	(Scotland) Partick Thistle
3	Dan Potts	(England)	LB	2015	14 April 1994 (age 32)	(England) West Ham United
5	Steve McNulty (c)	(England)	CB	2013	26 September 1983 (age 42)	(England) Fleetwood Town
6	Scott Cuthbert	(Scotland)	CB / RB	2015	15 June 1987 (age 39)	(England) Leyton Orient
12	Scott Griffiths	(England)	LB	2013	27 November 1985 (age 40)	(England) Peterborough United
18	Magnus Okuonghae	(England)	CB	2015	16 February 1986 (age 40)	(England) Colchester United
24	Curtley Williams	(England)	RB	2014	19 March 1990 (age 36)	(England) Lowestoft Town
25	Mark O'Brien	(Republic of Ireland)	CB / RB / LB / DM	2015	20 November 1992 (age 33)	(England) Derby County
30	Luke Wilkinson	(England)	CB	2014	2 December 1991 (age 34)	(England) Dagenham & Redbridge
31	Luke Trotman	(England)	RB	2014	4 June 1997 (age 29)	(England) Luton Town Academy
33	Mark Onyemah	(England)	LB	2014	9 April 1996 (age 30)	(England) Thurrock
Midfielders
4	Jonathan Smith	(England)	DM / CM	2013	17 October 1986 (age 39)	(England) York City
7	Alex Lawless	(Wales)	LM / CM	2010	26 March 1985 (age 41)	(England) York City
8	Cameron McGeehan	(Northern Ireland)	CM	2015	6 April 1995 (age 31)	(England) Norwich City
10	Ryan Hall	(England)	RW/LW	2015	4 January 1988 (age 38)	(England) Rotherham United
11	Danny Green	(England)	RW	2015	9 July 1988 (age 38)	(England) Milton Keynes Dons
15	Paddy McCourt	(Northern Ireland)	LW	2015	16 December 1983 (age 42)	(England) Brighton & Hove Albion
17	Pelly Ruddock Mpanzu	(England)	CM	2014	17 July 1993 (age 33)	(England) West Ham United
19	Olly Lee	(England)	CM	2015	11 July 1991 (age 35)	(England) Birmingham City
21	Luke Guttridge	(England)	AM	2013	27 March 1982 (age 44)	(England) Northampton Town
26	Nathan Doyle	(England)	DM	2014	12 January 1987 (age 39)	(England) Bradford City
34	Isaac Galliford	(England)	AM	2015	24 October 1996 (age 29)	(England) Luton Town Academy
	Jake Howells	(Wales)	LB / LW / CM	2008	18 May 1991 (age 35)	(England) Luton Town Academy
	Andy Parry	(England)	CM / CB	2013	13 September 1991 (age 34)	(England) Southport
	Matt Robinson	(England)	CM	2012	1 June 1994 (age 32)	(England) Leicester City
Forwards
9	Paul Benson	(England)	ST	2014	12 October 1979 (age 46)	(England) Swindon Town
14	Jack Marriott	(England)	ST	2015	9 September 1994 (age 31)	(England) Ipswich Town
22	Craig Mackail-Smith	(Scotland)	ST	2015	25 February 1984 (age 42)	(England) Brighton & Hove Albion
23	Josh McQuoid	(Northern Ireland)	ST / RW/LW	2015	15 December 1989 (age 36)	(England) AFC Bournemouth
35	Zane Banton	(England)	ST	2013	6 June 1996 (age 30)	(England) Luton Town Academy

== New contracts ==
No.	Pos	Player	Contract length	Contract end	Date	Source
14	ST	(England) Jack Marriott	2 years	2017	25 August 2015	
19	CM	(England) Olly Lee	2 years	2017	22 September 2015	

== Transfers ==
=== Transfers in ===
No.	Pos	Player	Transferred From	Fee	Date	Source
6	CB	(Scotland) Scott Cuthbert	(England) Leyton Orient	Free	1 July 2015	
14	ST	(England) Jack Marriott	(England) Ipswich Town	Free	1 July 2015	
15	LW	(Northern Ireland) Paddy McCourt	(England) Brighton & Hove Albion	Free	1 July 2015	
8	CM	(Northern Ireland) Cameron McGeehan	(England) Norwich City	Undisclosed	1 July 2015	
23	ST	(Northern Ireland) Josh McQuoid	(England) AFC Bournemouth	Free	1 July 2015	
2	RB	(Scotland) Stephen O'Donnell	(Scotland) Partick Thistle	Free	1 July 2015	
18	CB	(England) Magnus Okuonghae	(England) Colchester United	Free	1 July 2015	
3	LB	(England) Dan Potts	(England) West Ham United	Free	1 July 2015	
11	RW	(England) Danny Green	(England) Milton Keynes Dons	Free	4 July 2015	
25	CB	(Republic of Ireland) Mark O'Brien	(England) Derby County	Free	9 July 2015	
22	ST	(Scotland) Craig Mackail-Smith	(England) Brighton & Hove Albion	Free	1 August 2015	
19	CM	(England) Olly Lee	(England) Birmingham City	Free	21 August 2015	

=== Transfers out ===
No.	Pos	Player	Transferred To	Fee	Date	Source
18	ST	(England) Ross Lafayette	(England) Eastleigh	Free	1 July 2015	
8	AM	(England) Andy Drury	(England) Eastleigh	Free	13 July 2015	
2	CB	(England) Fraser Franks	(England) Stevenage	Free	15 July 2015	
6	CB	(England) Alex Lacey	(England) Yeovil Town	Free	22 July 2015	

=== Loans out ===
No.	Pos	Player	Loaned To	Start	End	Source
31	GK	(England) Craig King	(England) Metropolitan Police	3 August 2015	7 May 2016	
33	LB	(England) Mark Onyemah	(England) Dartford	6 August 2015	4 October 2015	(Note: On 7 September 2015, Onyemah's loan was extended until 4 October 2015.)
32	RB	(England) Luke Trotman	(England) St Neots Town	18 August 2015	17 September 2015	
32	RB	(England) Luke Trotman	(England) Histon	18 September 2015	17 October 2015	
34	AM	(England) Isaac Galliford	(England) St Neots Town	18 August 2015		
35	ST	(England) Zane Banton	(England) Boreham Wood	21 September 2015	20 October 2015	
—	CB	(England) Andy Parry	(England) Altrincham	21 August 2015	23 September 2015	
—	CM	(England) Matt Robinson	(England) Grimsby Town	21 August 2015	19 September 2015	
—	LW	(England) Jake Howells	(England) Yeovil Town	11 September 2015	10 October 2015	

=== Overall transfer activity ===
==== Spending ====
Summer: ▼ Undisclosed

Total: ▼ Undisclosed

==== Income ====
Summer: ▲£180,000

Total: ▲£180,000

==== Net expenditure ====
Summer: ▲ Undisclosed (~ £180,000)

Total: ▲ Undisclosed (~ £180,000)

== Competitions ==
=== Pre-season friendlies ===
On 7 May 2015, Luton Town announced their pre-season schedule. On 23 June 2015, Luton added Farense to the pre-season diary.

7 July 2015 Friendly	Farense	0–1	Luton Town	Algarve, Portugal
18:00 CEST		Report	O'Donnell 38'	Stadium: Vila Real de Santo Sports Complex; Attendance: Unknown

12 July 2015 Friendly	Lowestoft Town	1–2	Luton Town XI	Lowestoft
14:30 BST	Woods-Garness 75'	Report	Tiryaki 34', 56'	Stadium: Crown Meadow; Attendance: 528

14 July 2015 Friendly	Boreham Wood	1–1	Luton Town	Borehamwood
19:30 BST	Morias 48'	Report	Mackail-Smith 76'	Stadium: Meadow Park; Attendance: Unknown

16 July 2015 Friendly	Hitchin Town	0–0	Luton Town	Hitchin
19:45 BST		Report		Stadium: Top Field; Attendance: 1,661

18 July 2015 Friendly	Peacehaven & Telscombe	1–1	Luton Town	Peacehaven
13:00 BST	Schaaf 26'	Report	Benson 44'	Stadium: The Sports Park; Attendance: 350

20 July 2015 Friendly	Gosport Borough	2–5	Luton Town	Gosport
19:45 BST	Harding 47'; Bennett 67' (pen.)	Report	Green 5'; McQuoid 21', 80'; McGeehan 50' (pen.); Banton 84'	Stadium: Privett Park; Attendance: Unknown

21 July 2015 Friendly	Kettering Town	1–2	Luton Town XI	Burton Latimer
19:00 BST	Obeng 30'	Report	Rowe 18'; Marriott 57'	Stadium: Latimer Park; Attendance: 419

22 July 2015 Friendly	Thurrock	2–4	Luton Town	Aveley
19:45 BST	Francis 2'; J. Clark 87'	Report	own goal 5'; Howells 17' (pen.), 78'; Atkinson 61'	Stadium: Ship Lane; Attendance: Unknown

25 July 2015 Friendly	Luton Town	1–1	Coventry City	Luton
15:00 BST	Marriott 86'	Report	Maddison 48'	Stadium: Kenilworth Road; Attendance: 2,436

28 July 2015 Friendly	Luton Town	2–1	Brentford	Luton
19:45 BST	Wilkinson 40'; Zola 79'	Report	Hofmann 7'	Stadium: Kenilworth Road; Attendance: 2,556

28 July 2015 Friendly	AFC Hornchurch	0–2	Luton Town XI	Upminster
19:45 BST		Report	Hall 17'; Banton 35'	Stadium: Hornchurch Stadium; Attendance: Unknown

1 August 2015 Friendly	Luton Town	0–1	Walsall	Luton
15:00 BST		Report	Bradshaw 6'	Stadium: Kenilworth Road; Attendance: 2,180

3 August 2015 Bedfordshire Premier Cup Final	Barton Rovers	1–6	Luton Town XI	Barton-le-Clay
19:45 BST	Blackett 50'	Report	Marriott 16', 75', 80', 89'; Banton 18'; Hall 82'	Stadium: Sharpenhoe Road; Attendance: Unknown

5 August 2015 Friendly	Dunstable Town	0–1	Luton Town XI	Dunstable
19:45 BST		Report	Murray 78'	Stadium: Creasey Park; Attendance: Unknown

=== League Two ===
==== League table ====
Pos	Team	Pld	W	D	L	GF	GA	GD	Pts
9	Cambridge United	46	18	14	14	66	55	+11	68
10	Carlisle United	46	17	16	13	67	62	+5	67
11	Luton Town	46	19	9	18	63	61	+2	66
12	Mansfield Town	46	17	13	16	61	53	+8	64
13	Wycombe Wanderers	46	17	13	16	45	44	+1	64

Updated to match(es) played on 7 May 2016. Source: BBC Sport
Rules for classification: 1) Points; 2) Goal difference; 3) Number of goals scored

==== Results by Matchday ====
Round	1	2	3	4	5	6	7	8	9	10	11	12	13	14	15	16	17	18	19	20	21	22	23	24	25	26	27	28	29	30	31	32	33	34	35	36	37	38	39	40	41	42	43	44	45	46
Ground	A	H	H	A	H	A	A	H	H	A	A	H	A	H	H	A	H	A	H	A	H	A	H	A	A	H	A	H	H	A	A	H	A	H	A	H	A	A	H	H	H	A	A	H	A	H
Result	D	D	L	L	L	W	L	W	W	W	W	D	L	D	L	W	W	D	L	L	L	W	L	D	L	D	W	L	D	W	L	W	W	W	W	L	W	L	L	L	W	W	W	D	L	W
Position	13	15	18	22	22	19	20	18	16	11	10	10	12	12	15	13	10	10	12	13	17	13	15	14	15	18	15	16	16	14	14	13	13	13	12	13	12	14	14	15	14	14	13	13	14	11

A = Away; H = Home; W = Win; D = Draw; L = Loss

==== Matches ====
On 17 June 2015, the fixtures for the forthcoming season were announced.

8 August 2015 1	Accrington Stanley	1–1	Luton Town	Accrington
15:00 BST	Windass 60' (pen.); Crooks (yellow card) 47'	Report	Smith 90+1'	Stadium: Crown Ground; Attendance: 2,359; Referee: Geoff Eltringham

15 August 2015 2	Luton Town	2–2	Oxford United	Luton
15:00 BST	Wilkinson 42'; McGeehan 69'	Report	Roofe 82'; Hoban 90+3'; MacDonald (yellow card) 34'	Stadium: Kenilworth Road; Attendance: 8,877; Referee: Mark Brown

18 August 2015 3	Luton Town	0–1	Bristol Rovers	Luton
19:45 BST	Wilkinson (yellow card) 16'; McCourt (yellow card) 55'	Report	Sinclair 90+4'; Harrison (yellow card) 76'	Stadium: Kenilworth Road; Attendance: 8,061; Referee: Trevor Kettle

22 August 2015 4	Yeovil Town	3–2	Luton Town	Yeovil
15:00 BST	Arthurworrey 38'; Bird 62', 73'; Roberts (yellow card) 88'	Report	Mackail-Smith 4'; Benson 19'; McNulty (yellow card) 34'; Smith (yellow card) 88'	Stadium: Huish Park; Attendance: 3,830; Referee: Simon Hooper

29 August 2015 5	Luton Town	1–2	Portsmouth	Luton
15:00 BST	Mackail-Smith 15' (pen.); Smith (yellow card) 12'; McGeehan (yellow card) 73'; Wilkinson (yellow card) 90+3'	Report	Evans 8'; Tubbs 90'	Stadium: Kenilworth Road; Attendance: 9,083; Referee: Peter Bankes

5 September 2015 6	Cambridge United	1–3	Luton Town	Cambridge
15:00 BST	Legge 28'; Dunk (yellow card) 63' (yellow-red card)	Report	Guttridge 21'; Wilkinson 66'; Green 84'; Lee (yellow card) 11'	Stadium: Abbey Stadium; Attendance: 6,298; Referee: Graham Salisbury

12 September 2015 7	Notts County	3–2	Luton Town	Nottingham
15:00 BST	McLeod (yellow card) 10', (goal) 32', 48'; Noble 90+3'; Swerts (yellow card) 15'; Snijders (yellow card) 29'; Amevor (yellow card) 44'; Burke (yellow card) 88'	Report	McGeehan 71'; Smith 76'; Green (yellow card) 34'; Cuthbert (red card) 90+1'	Stadium: Meadow Lane; Attendance: 5,820; Referee: Ben Toner

19 September 2015 8	Luton Town	1–0	Mansfield Town	Luton
15:00 BST	Mackail-Smith 59' (pen.); Smith (yellow card) 33'	Report	Hunt (yellow card) 25'; Thomas (yellow card) 46'; Tafazolli (yellow card) 58'	Stadium: Kenilworth Road; Attendance: 7,939; Referee: Kevin Johnson

26 September 2015 9	Luton Town	2–0	AFC Wimbledon	Luton
15:00 BST	Marriott 79', 90+4'; McCourt (yellow card) 89'	Report	Osborne (yellow card) 30' (yellow-red card) 35'	Stadium: Kenilworth Road; Attendance: 8,415; Referee: Brendan Malone

29 September 2015 10	Morecambe	1–3	Luton Town	Morecambe
19:45 BST	Barkhuizen 25'	Report	Wilkinson 13'; McGeehan 27'; Smith 88'; McNulty (yellow card) 68'	Stadium: Globe Arena; Attendance: 1,388; Referee: Chris Sarginson

3 October 2015 11	Hartlepool United	1–4	Luton Town	Hartlepool
15:00 BST	Paynter 44'; Harrison (yellow card) 90+1'	Report	Smith 17'; Marriott 53', 57'; Lee 90+1'	Stadium: Victoria Park; Attendance: 3,876; Referee: Richard Clark

10 October 2015 12	Luton Town	1–1	York City	Luton
15:00 BST	McGeehan 63' (pen.)	Report	Lowe 38'; McCoy (yellow card) 68'	Stadium: Kenilworth Road; Attendance: 8,618; Referee: Darren Handley

17 October 2015 13	Crawley Town	2–1	Luton Town	Crawley
15:00 BST	Murphy 67'; Harrold 81'; Smith (yellow card) 56'	Report	McGeehan 31' (yellow card) 90+5'; Long (yellow card) 30'; Lee (yellow card) 54'; Doyle (yellow card) 57'	Stadium: Broadfield Stadium; Attendance: 3,335; Referee: Gavin Ward

20 October 2015 14	Luton Town	1–1	Leyton Orient	Luton
19:45 BST	Marriott 33'; Wilkinson (yellow card) 39'	Report	Simpson 47'	Stadium: Kenilworth Road; Attendance: 8,022; Referee: Tim Robinson

24 October 2015 15	Luton Town	1–2	Plymouth Argyle	Luton
15:00 BST	McQuoid 76'; Doyle (yellow card) 42'; Hall (yellow card) 84' (yellow-red card)	Report	McHugh 17'; Brunt 90+5'; Tanner (yellow card) 83'	Stadium: Kenilworth Road; Attendance: 8,703; Referee: Ross Joyce

1 November 2015 16	Dagenham & Redbridge F.C.	0–2	Luton Town	London
14:00 GMT	Connors (yellow card) 35'; Obileye (yellow card) 45+2'; Labadie (yellow card) 58'; Cureton (yellow card) 84'	Report	Guttridge 40'; Lawless (yellow card) 35', (goal) 64'	Stadium: Victoria Road; Attendance: 2,723; Referee: Keith Hill

14 November 2015 17	Luton Town	2–0	Barnet	Luton
15:00 GMT	Green 25' (yellow card) 70'; McGeehan 67'; Lawless (yellow card) 55'	Report		Stadium: Kenilworth Road; Attendance: 8,497; Referee: Darren England

21 November 2015 18	Stevenage	0–0	Luton Town	Stevenage
15:00 GMT	Wells (yellow card) 76'; Conlon (yellow card) 90'	Report	Lee (yellow card) 57'; Benson (red card) 87'	Stadium: The Lamex Stadium; Attendance: 4,782; Referee: Robert Lewis

24 November 2015 19	Luton Town	3–4	Carlisle United	Luton
19:45 GMT	Marriott 4'; McQuoid 46'; Green 57', (yellow card) 68'	Report	Wyke 45'; Gilliead 66'; Ibhere 79'; Asamoah 80'; Grainger (yellow card) 55'; Héry (yellow card) 56'	Stadium: Kenilworth Road; Attendance: 7,298; Referee: Lee Swabey

28 November 2015 20	Newport County	3–0	Luton Town	Newport
15:00 GMT	McBurnie 63', 79', 86'	Report		Stadium: Rodney Parade; Attendance: 2,551; Referee: David Coote

12 December 201 21	Luton Town	3–4	Northampton Town	Luton
15:00 GMT	Benson 9', 52'; Green 66', (yellow card) 88'; Okuonghae (yellow card) 69'; Griffiths (yellow card) 90+1'	Report	O'Toole 18'; D'Ath 30'; Richards 42'; Holmes 69'	Stadium: Kenilworth Road; Attendance: 8,792; Referee: Mike Jones

19 December 2015 22	Exeter City	2–3	Luton Town	Exeter
15:00 GMT	Grant (yellow card) 33'; Morrison (yellow card) 62'; Nichols 71'; Nicholls 82'	Report	McGeehan 30' (pen.), (yellow card) 90+13'; Green 34'; Benson 90+10'	Stadium: St James Park; Attendance: 3,777; Referee: Brendan Malone

26 December 2015 23	Luton Town	0–2	Wycombe Wanderers	Luton
15:00 GMT	Lee (yellow card) 79'	Report	Thompson 51'; Hayes 66'	Stadium: Kenilworth Road; Attendance: 9,676; Referee: Dean Whitestone

28 December 2015 24	Portsmouth	0–0	Luton Town	Portsmouth
15:00 GMT	Doyle (yellow card) 67'	Report	Lawless (yellow card) 37'; Okuonghae (yellow card) 70'; O'Donnell (yellow card) 80'	Stadium: Fratton Park; Attendance: 17,668; Referee: Gavin Ward

2 January 2016 25	Bristol Rovers	2–0	Luton Town	Bristol
15:00 GMT	Gaffney 60', 72'; Taylor (yellow card) 66'	Report	Hall (yellow card) 10'; Cuthbert (yellow card) 15'; Howells (yellow card) 43'; McCourt (yellow card) 84'	Stadium: Memorial Stadium; Attendance: 9,131; Referee: Lee Swabey

16 January 2016 26	Luton Town	0–0	Cambridge United	Luton
15:00 GMT	Smith (yellow card) 45'; Marriott (yellow card) 54'; McQuoid (yellow card) 65'; Benson (yellow card) 74'; Lawless (yellow card) 80'	Report	Dunne (yellow card) 70'	Stadium: Kenilworth Road; Attendance: 9,227; Referee: Andy Madley

23 January 2016 27	Mansfield Town	0–2	Luton Town	Mansfield
15:00 GMT	Clements (yellow card) 28'	Report	McCourt 7'; Ruddock 54'; Sheehan (yellow card) 64'; O'Donnell (yellow card) 83'	Stadium: Field Mill; Attendance: 4,245; Referee: Ben Toner

30 January 2016 28	Luton Town	0–2	Notts County	Luton
15:00 GMT	Lawless (yellow card) 3'; McGeehan (yellow card) 32'	Report	Sheehan 58' (o.g.); McLeod (yellow card) 60'; Stead 70'	Stadium: Kenilworth Road; Attendance: 8,147; Referee: Keith Hill

2 February 2016 29	Luton Town	1–1	Yeovil Town	Luton
19:45 GMT	Mackail-Smith (yellow card) 69'; Sheehan 84'	Report	Walsh 70'; Weale (yellow card) 90+7'	Stadium: Kenilworth Road; Attendance: 7,538; Referee: Nigel Miller

6 February 2016 30	Wycombe Wanderers	0–1	Luton Town	High Wycombe
15:00 GMT	Jombati (yellow card) 50'; Jacobson (yellow card) 86'	Report	Lawless (yellow card) 32'; McGeehan 40'; Pigott (yellow card) 44'; Lee (yellow card) 53'; Marriott	Stadium: Adams Park; Attendance: 4,597; Referee: Seb Stockbridge

13 February 2016 31	Wimbledon	4–1	Luton Town	Kingston upon Thames
15:00 GMT	Marriott 23' (o.g.); Taylor 25', 49'; Rigg 47'	Report	Benson (yellow card) 38'; Marriott 59'; McGeehan (yellow card) 75'	Stadium: Kingsmeadow; Attendance: 4,439; Referee: Chris Sarginson

20 February 2016 32	Luton Town	2–1	Hartlepool United	Luton
15:00 GMT	McGeehan 60', (yellow card) 64'; Lee (yellow card) 62'; Mackail-Smith 86'	Report	Thomas (yellow card) 45+1'; Jackson 65'; Featherstone (yellow card) 89'	Stadium: Kenilworth Road; Attendance: 7,880; Referee: Andy Davies

27 February 2016 33	York City	2–3	Luton Town	York
15:00 GMT	Fewster 62', 82'	Report	McGeehan (yellow card) 27', (goal) 52'; Marriott 72'; Mackail-Smith (yellow card) 81'; Green (yellow card) 86'; Lee 90+2'	Stadium: Bootham Crescent; Attendance: 3,628; Referee: Geoff Eltringham

1 March 2016 34	Luton Town	1–0	Morecambe	Luton
19:45 GMT	Marriott 76'	Report		Stadium: Kenilworth Road; Attendance: 7,153; Referee: Darren Deadman

5 March 2016 35	Leyton Orient	0–1	Luton Town	Luton
15:00 GMT		Report	Marriott 76'; O'Donnell (yellow card) 30'; Mackail-Smith (yellow card) 89'; Mitchell (yellow card) 90+2'	Stadium: Kenilworth Road; Attendance: 5,684; Referee: Charles Breakspear

12 March 2016 36	Luton Town	0–1	Crawley Town	Luton
15:00 GMT		Report	Harrold 12'; McAlinden (yellow card) 26'	Stadium: Kenilworth Road; Attendance: 8,264; Referee: Michael Bull

19 March 2016 37	Plymouth Argyle	0–1	Luton Town	Plymouth
15:00 GMT	Purrington (yellow card) 87'	Report	Marriott 27'; Smith (yellow card) 59'; McGeehan (yellow card) 77'; Rea (yellow card) 89'	Stadium: Home Park; Attendance: 7,973; Referee: Darren Bond

28 March 2016 38	Barnet	2–1	Luton Town	London
15:00 BST	Gambin 49'; Pearson (yellow card) 71'; Weston (yellow card) 78'; Sesay (yellow card) 81'; Ngala (yellow card) 84'; Akinde 90+6' (pen.), (yellow card) 90+7'	Report	Smith (yellow card) 8'; McGeehan 85'; Cuthbert (yellow card) 90+5'; Sheehan (yellow card) 90+9'	Stadium: The Hive Stadium; Attendance: 4,008; Referee: Graham Salisbury

2 April 2016 39	Luton Town	0–1	Stevenage	Luton
15:00 BST	McCourt (yellow card) 90+7'	Report	Mulraney (yellow card) 48'; Tonge 85' (pen.)	Stadium: Kenilworth Road; Attendance: 8,502; Referee: Darren Handley

9 April 2016 40	Luton Town	0–2	Accrington Stanley	Luton
15:00 BST	McQuoid (yellow card) 21'; Benson (yellow card) 90'	Report	Brown 47'; Pearson (yellow card) 55'; Hughes (yellow card) 77'; Gornell 84', (yellow card) 84'	Stadium: Kenilworth Road; Attendance: 7,467; Referee: Peter Bankes

12 April 2016 41	Luton Town	1–0	Dagenham & Redbridge	Luton
19:45 BST	Ruddock 37'; Rea (yellow card) 69'	Report	Labadie (yellow card) 64'	Stadium: Kenilworth Road; Attendance: 6,997; Referee: Charles Breakspear

16 April 2016 42	Oxford United	2–3	Luton Town	Oxford
15:00 BST	Hylton 2', (yellow card) 32'; Dunkley 51'; Kenny (yellow card) 75'	Report	Pigott 44', 58'; Lee 45+3'	Stadium: Kassam Stadium; Attendance: 8,838; Referee: Trevor Kettle

19 April 2016 43	Carlisle United	1–2	Luton Town	Carlisle
19:45 BST	Stacey 61'	Report	Pigott 23'; McQuoid 51', (yellow card) 74'	Stadium: Brunton Park; Attendance: 3,497; Referee: Tony Harrington

23 April 2016 44	Luton Town	1–1	Newport County	Luton
15:00 BST	McQuoid (yellow card) 40'; Marriott 81'	Report	Davies (yellow card) 39'; Coulibaly 88'	Stadium: Kenilworth Road; Attendance: 7,606; Referee: Fred Graham

30 April 2016 45	Northampton Town	2–0	Luton Town	Northampton
15:00 BST	Diamond 4'; Lelan (yellow card) 17'; Marquis 36'	Report	McGeehan (yellow card) 73'	Stadium: Sixfields Stadium; Attendance: 7,664; Referee: Darren Bond

7 May 2016 46	Luton Town	4–1	Exeter City	Luton
15:00 BST	McGeehan 27'; Marriott 33', 63'; Pigott 34'	Report	Stockley 47', (yellow card) 57'	Stadium: Kenilworth Road; Attendance: 8,427; Referee: Carl Boyeson

=== FA Cup ===
7 November 2015 First round	Crawley Town	1–2	Luton Town	Crawley
15:00 GMT	Harrold 63'; Walton (yellow card) 22'	Report	McQuoid 54', 90'	Stadium: Broadfield Stadium; Attendance: 1,929; Referee: Nick Kinseley

6 December 2015 Second round	Peterborough United	2–0	Luton Town	Peterborough
15:00 GMT	Washington 35'; Maddison 82'	Report	Long (yellow card) 29'; Green (yellow card) 87'	Stadium: London Road Stadium; Attendance: 8,329; Referee: Nigel Miller

=== League Cup ===
11 August 2015 First round	Luton Town	3–1	Bristol City	Luton
19:45 BST	Marriott 44', 63'; Benson 59'	Report	Robinson 71'	Stadium: Kenilworth Road; Attendance: 3,948; Referee: James Linington

25 August 2015 Second round	Luton Town	1–1 (7–8 p)	Stoke City	Luton
19:45 BST	McGeehan 90+1'; O'Brien (yellow card) 7'; Smith (yellow card) 103'	Report	Walters 67'; Sidwell (yellow card) 45'; Bardsley (yellow card) 51'; Diouf (yellow card) 120+1'	Stadium: Kenilworth Road; Attendance: 6,099; Referee: Paul Tierney
	Penalties
	Benson (penalty scored); McGeehan (penalty scored); Lee (penalty scored); Wilkinson (penalty scored); Hall (penalty scored); O'Donnell (penalty scored); Smith (penalty scored); Griffiths (penalty missed)		(penalty scored) Walters; (penalty scored) Joselu; (penalty scored) Bardsley; (penalty scored) Sidwell; (penalty scored) Wilson; (penalty scored) Diouf; (penalty scored) Wollscheid; (penalty scored) Cameron

=== Football League Trophy ===
1 September 2015 First round	Luton Town	2–1	Leyton Orient	Luton
19:15 BST	Green 29'; O'Donnell 90'; McNulty (yellow card) 38'; Marriott (red card) 81'	Report	James (yellow card) 38' (goal) 59'; Shaw (yellow card) 89'	Stadium: Kenilworth Road; Attendance: 1,953; Referee: Nicholas Kinseley

6 October 2015 Second round	Gillingham	2–1	Luton Town	Gillingham
19:45 BST	Ehmer 65'; Dack 83'; McGlashan (yellow card) 74'	Report	McGeehan 41'; Guttridge (yellow card) 43'; Green (yellow card) 62'	Stadium: Priestfield; Attendance: 3,428; Referee: Michael Bull

== Appearances and goals ==
Numbers in parentheses denote appearances as substitute.
Players with names struck through and marked † left the club during the playing season.
Players with names in italics and marked * were on loan from another club for the whole of their season with Luton.
Players listed with no appearances have been in the matchday squad but only as unused substitutes.
Key to positions: GK – Goalkeeper; DF – Defender; MF – Midfielder; FW – Forward

Players included in matchday squads
No.	Pos.	Nat.	Name	League		FA Cup		League Cup		FL Trophy		Total		Discipline	
No.	Pos.	Nat.	Name	Apps	Goals	Apps	Goals	Apps	Goals	Apps	Goals	Apps	Goals	A yellow rectangle, denoting the yellow penalty card shown to a player being cautioned	A red rectangle, denoting the red penalty card shown to a player being sent off
1	GK	ENG	Mark Tyler	27	0	1	0	1	0	2	0	31	0	0	0
2	DF	SCO	Stephen O'Donnell	30	0	0	0	2	0	1	1	33	1	3	0
3	DF	ENG	Dan Potts	14	0	0	0	1	0	1	0	16	0	0	0
4	MF	ENG	Jonathan Smith	33 (4)	4	2	0	1	0	1	0	37 (4)	4	7	0
5	DF	ENG	~~Steve McNulty~~ †	9 (1)	0	0	0	1	0	1	0	11 (1)	0	3	0
5	DF	IRL	Glen Rea *	10	0	0	0	0	0	0	0	10	0	2	0
6	DF	SCO	Scott Cuthbert	36	0	1	0	2	0	1	0	40	0	2	1
7	MF	WAL	Alex Lawless	21 (7)	1	2	0	0	0	1	0	24 (7)	1	6	0
8	MF	NIR	Cameron McGeehan	35 (6)	12	0 (1)	0	1 (1)	1	1	1	37 (8)	14	9	0
9	FW	ENG	Paul Benson	13 (7)	4	0 (1)	0	1 (1)	1	0	0	14 (9)	5	3	1
10	MF	ENG	Ryan Hall	5 (5)	0	0	0	0 (1)	0	0 (2)	0	5 (8)	0	2	1
11	MF	ENG	Danny Green	19 (6)	5	0 (2)	0	1	0	1 (1)	1	21 (9)	6	7	0
12	DF	ENG	Scott Griffiths	17 (1)	0	1 (1)	0	1 (1)	0	1 (1)	0	20 (4)	0	1	0
14	FW	ENG	Jack Marriott	21 (19)	14	1	0	1	2	2	0	25 (19)	16	2	1
15	MF	NIR	Paddy McCourt	15 (9)	1	1	0	0	0	0	0	16 (9)	1	4	0
16	GK	ENG	Elliot Justham	14 (1)	0	1	0	1	0	0	0	16 (1)	0	0	0
17	MF	ENG	Pelly Ruddock Mpanzu	12 (9)	2	0	0	2	0	1	0	15 (9)	2	0	0
18	DF	NGR	Magnus Okuonghae	7 (4)	0	1	0	0	0	1 (1)	0	9 (5)	0	2	0
19	MF	ENG	Olly Lee	31 (3)	3	2	0	1	0	2	0	36 (3)	3	6	0
20	DF	IRL	~~Sean Long~~ * †	7 (2)	0	2	0	0	0	0	0	9 (2)	0	2	0
21	MF	ENG	~~Luke Guttridge~~ †	6 (2)	2	1	0	0	0	2	0	9 (2)	2	1	0
21	GK	ENG	~~Jonathan Mitchell~~ * †	5	0	0	0	0	0	0	0	5	0	1	0
22	FW	SCO	Craig Mackail-Smith	27 (6)	4	1	0	0	0	0	0	28 (6)	4	3	0
23	FW	NIR	Josh McQuoid	20 (9)	3	2	2	1 (1)	0	1 (1)	0	24 (11)	5	4	0
24	DF	ENG	Curtley Williams	0	0	0	0	0	0	0	0	0	0	0	0
25	DF	IRL	Mark O'Brien	2 (4)	0	0	0	2	0	1	0	5 (4)	0	1	0
26	MF	ENG	Nathan Doyle	6 (5)	0	1	0	0 (1)	0	1	0	8 (6)	0	2	0
27	MF	ENG	Tyreeq Bakinson	0 (1)	0	0	0	0	0	0	0	0 (1)	0	0	0
30	DF	ENG	~~Luke Wilkinson~~ †	20	3	2	0	2	0	0	0	24	3	3	0
31	GK	ENG	Craig King	0	0	0	0	0	0	0	0	0	0	0	0
35	FW	ENG	Zane Banton	0 (4)	0	0	0	0	0	0	0	0 (4)	0	0	0
36	DF	ENG	James Justin	0 (1)	0	0	0	0	0	0	0	0 (1)	0	0	0
37	DF	ENG	Frankie Musonda	0 (3)	0	0	0	0	0	0	0	0 (3)	0	0	0
40	DF	WAL	Jake Howells	14 (3)	0	0	0	0	0	0	0	14 (3)	0	1	0
44	DF	IRL	Alan Sheehan *	20	1	0	0	0	0	0	0	20	1	2	0
45	FW	ENG	Joe Pigott *	10 (5)	4	0	0	0	0	0	0	10 (5)	4	1	0

Players not included in matchday squads
No.	Pos.	Nat.	Name
32	DF	ENG	Luke Trotman
33	DF	ENG	Mark Onyemah
34	MF	ENG	Isaac Galliford

== Honours ==
=== Individuals ===
==== Players ====
No.	Pos	Player	Award	Month	Source

==== Manager ====
Name	Award	Month	Source
