= Curtley Williams =

English footballer (born 1990)

Personal information
- Full name: Curtley Benjamin Williams
- Date of birth: 19 March 1990 (age 36)
- Place of birth: Ipswich, England
- Height: 6 ft 0 in (1.82 m)
- Position: Right back

Team information
- Current team: Felixstowe & Walton United

Youth career
- 2001–2008: Ipswich Town

Senior career*
Years	Team	Apps	(Gls)
2009–2010	Stafford Rangers	6	(0)
2010–2011	Jerez Industrial	24	(0)
2011	Chelmsford City	7	(0)
2011–2012	A.F.C. Telford United	0	(0)
2011–2012	→ Buxton (loan)		
2012–2014	Lowestoft Town	56	(1)
2014–2016	Luton Town	3	(0)
2016–2017	Dagenham & Redbridge	10	(0)
2017–2018	Needham Market	3	(0)
2019–2020	Stowmarket Town		
2021–	Felixstowe & Walton United	27	(0)
- * Club domestic league appearances and goals as of 22:41, 19 April 2022 (UTC)

Curtley Benjamin Williams (born 19 March 1990) is an English semi-professional footballer who plays as a right back for Felixstowe & Walton United.

== Career ==
=== Early career ===
Born in Ipswich, Suffolk, Williams was on the books of local club Ipswich Town from the age of 10. He was later named captain of the U18s team, but was released from the club in the summer of 2008 without being offered a professional contract. Williams became part of the Glenn Hoddle Academy in Spain, before returning to England to sign for Conference North club Stafford Rangers helping them to move into the top half of the table. In February 2010, he returned to Spain to play for Jerez Industrial as part of his development.

Williams joined Conference South club Chelmsford City in February 2011, signing a short-term contract until the end of the 2010–11 season. He made seven league appearances for the club, before being released at the end of the season. In September 2011, he joined Conference Premier club A.F.C. Telford United on deadline day. A week later he was sent out on loan to Northern Premier League Premier Division club Buxton, making his debut against Nantwich Town. Following his release, Williams played for a short time in South Africa.

=== Lowestoft Town ===
In 2012, Williams joined Isthmian League Premier Division club Lowestoft Town, later signing a contract in January 2013 through to the end of the 2013–14 season. He made his debut for the club in a 3–2 away win over Enfield Town on 1 December 2012. Williams suffered a hamstring injury during the warm-up before a 1–0 away win over Kingstonian on 25 March 2013, missing four games before making a return to the starting lineup in a 2–0 away win over Canvey Island on 6 April 2013. He went on to make a total of 23 league appearances, scoring once in a 4–1 home win over Cray Wanderers on 9 April 2013. He helped Lowestoft to finish in second position in the league table, thus qualifying for the Isthmian League Premier Division play-offs after a 1–0 home win over Hendon on 27 April 2013. Williams played in the play-off semi-final, as Lowestoft earned a 1–0 win over East Thurrock United on 1 May 2013 to advance to the play-off final. Williams and his Lowestoft teammates suffered a 2–1 defeat to Concord Rangers on 6 May 2013, resulting in the club being defeated in three successive play-off finals.

During the 2013–14 season, Williams made 33 league appearances, including three assists. He helped Lowestoft to keep 17 clean sheets in the games he was involved in, as the club once again qualified for the Isthmian League Premier Division play-offs after a 3–0 home win over Harrow Borough on 26 April 2014. However, Williams suffered a setback during the game as he clattered into the advertising boards, injuring his shoulder and had to be replaced. As a result of the injury, he missed the 2–1 play-off semi-final win over Bognor Regis Town on 30 April 2014. Williams also missed the 3–0 play-off final win over A.F.C. Hornchurch on 5 May 2014, as Lowestoft were finally promoted to the Conference North after three successive play-off final defeats.

=== Luton Town ===
On 15 May 2014, Williams was signed by League Two club Luton Town on a two-year professional contract, after manager John Still had been tracking his progress at Lowestoft. He made his Luton debut in a 1–0 home win over Cheltenham Town on 13 September 2014. He made his second successive appearance in a 0–0 draw with York City on 16 September 2014, followed by a third successive appearance in a 1–0 away win over Cambridge United on 20 September 2014. However, Williams suffered an injury after 27 minutes and was replaced by Andy Drury. Thereafter, he continued to struggle with injuries throughout the season, failing to make any further appearances and was placed on the transfer list in May 2015.

Despite being placed on the transfer list, Williams remained with Luton for the entirety of the 2015–16 season, failing to make a single appearance and was an unused substitute on five occasions.

On 10 May 2016, it was announced that Williams would not have his contract renewed and would leave the club at the end of his contract.

=== Dagenham & Redbridge ===
Williams signed a one-year contract with newly relegated National League club Dagenham & Redbridge on 6 June 2016, with the option of a further year. He debuted on the opening day of 2016–17 in a 3–0 win at home to Southport. After starting the first five matches of the season, Williams sustained a knee injury that would rule him out until March. He made his return to the team in the starting lineup at home to York City on 25 March 2017, which resulted in a 1–0 win. Williams started in the second leg of the play-off semi-final defeat to Forest Green Rovers, losing 3–1 on aggregate, and finished the season with 11 appearances. He was released by Dagenham & Redbridge when his contract expired at the end of 2016–17.

=== Needham Market ===
In December 2017, Williams signed for Isthmian League Premier Division club Needham Market.

=== Stowmarket Town ===
On 31 July 2019 it was confirmed, that Williams had signed a one-year contract with Stowmarket Town.

=== Felixstowe & Walton United ===
He signed for Felixstowe & Walton United ahead of the 2021–22 in the Isthmian League Division One North.

== Career statistics ==
As of match played 18 April 2022

Appearances and goals by club, season and competition
Club	Season	League			National Cup		League Cup		Other		Total	
Club	Season	Division	Apps	Goals	Apps	Goals	Apps	Goals	Apps	Goals	Apps	Goals
Stafford Rangers	2009–10	Conference North	6	0	—		—		—		6	0
Jerez Industrial	2009–10	Segunda División B	9	0	—		—		—		9	0
Jerez Industrial	2010–11	Tercera División	15	0	—		—		—		15	0
Jerez Industrial	Total		24	0	—		—		—		24	0
Chelmsford City	2010–11	Conference South	7	0	0	0	—		0	0	7	0
Lowestoft Town	2012–13	Isthmian League Premier Division	23	1	—		—		4 (Note: Two appearances in Isthmian League Premier Division play-offs, two in Suffolk Premier Cup)	0	27	1
Lowestoft Town	2013–14	Isthmian League Premier Division	33	0	0	0	—		3 (Note: One appearance in Suffolk Premier Cup, one in FA Trophy, one in Isthmian League Cup)	0	36	0
Lowestoft Town	Total		56	1	0	0	—		7	0	63	1
Luton Town	2014–15	League Two	3	0	0	0	0	0	0	0	3	0
Luton Town	2015–16	League Two	0	0	0	0	0	0	0	0	0	0
Luton Town	Total		3	0	0	0	0	0	0	0	3	0
Dagenham & Redbridge	2016–17	National League	10	0	0	0	—		1 (Note: Appearance in National League play-offs)	0	11	0
Needham Market	2017–18	Isthmian League Premier Division	3	0	—		—		0	0	3	0
Felixstowe & Walton United	2021–22	Isthmian League North Division	27	0	2	0	—		2 (Note: One appearance in FA Trophy, one in Suffolk Premier Cup)	0	31	0
Career total			136	1	2	0	0	0	10	0	148	1

== Honours ==
Lowestoft Town

- Isthmian League Premier Division play-offs: 2013–14
