= St Albans City F.C. =

Association football club in St Albans, England

St Albans City
- Full name: St Albans City Football Club
- Nickname: The Saints
- Founded: April 1908; 118 years ago
- Ground: Clarence Park
- Capacity: 5,007 (667 seated)
- Owners: Lawrence Levy and John McGowan
- Manager: Gary McCann
- League: Isthmian League Premier Division
- 2025–26: Isthmian League Premier Division, 11th of 22
- Website: stalbanscityfc.com
| Home colours | Away colours |

St Albans City Football Club (nicknamed The Saints) is a semi-professional association football team based in St Albans, Hertfordshire, England. The club competes in the Isthmian League Premier Division, the seventh level of the English football league system.

It was founded in 1908 and plays its home matches at Clarence Park, about 800 yards from the city centre. The Club coming into the 2000s hit financial difficulties and was 3 days from bankruptcy and extinction until saved by John Gibson with the backing of his own business. Following a non league restructure St Albans City joined the new Conference South for the 2004–05 season having been promoted following a play off and victory against Bedford Town in which Steve Castle scored the winning goal. The Club then following promotion, competed in the Conference Premier (now the National League) during the 2006–07 season under the guidance of the then chairman John Gibson with Manager Colin Lippiat, but was relegated back to the Conference South after one season and subsequently suffered a further relegation in 2010–11, before returning to the sixth tier in 2013–14 after beating Chesham United 3–1 in the play-off final.

== History ==
=== Early history ===
Formed in April 1908, St Albans City FC became members both the Spartan League Eastern Division and the Herts County League Western Division. City were champions of the Spartan League Eastern Division and the Herts County League Western Division in 1909–10. St Albans joined the Athenian League in 1920 and won the Athenian League in 1920–21 and 1921–22.

City's most famous match was arguably on 22 November 1922 in a fourth round qualifying FA Cup match. Having been held by Dulwich Hamlet to a 1–1 draw at Clarence Park on 18 November, the replay drew a gate of 4,060. City's New Zealand-born goalkeeper W. Tennant did not appear, his place taken by Alf Fearn who was usually a half-back with the reserves. Dulwich put eight goals past him, the winning goal coming in near darkness at the end of extra time. What put the game in the record books was that City scored seven times, with all seven goals being scored by Wilfred Minter. His feat remains the highest tally by a player on the losing side of an FA Cup tie.

St Albans joined the Isthmian League in 1923 and won it in 1923–24, 1926–27 and 1927–28. City were runners-up in the Isthmian League in 1954–55. In 1973–74, the Saints were relegated from the Isthmian League Premier Division to Division Two along with Corinthian Casuals, being the first clubs to be relegated within the Isthmian League. Division Two was renamed Division One in 1977–78, and in 1982–83, St Albans were relegated to the new Division Two. However, City were promoted back to Division One a year later, with a second promotion to the Isthmian League Premier Division occurring in 1985–86. St Albans were semi-finalists in the 1998–99 FA Trophy, losing 4–3 over two legs to Forest Green Rovers.

=== 21st century ===
In the 2003–04 Isthmian League, St Albans finished 19th in the Isthmian League, but due to a restructuring, they participated in a play-off for a position in the newly formed Conference South. They won the play-off, beating Heybridge Swifts 4–3 and Bedford Town 5–4. In the 2005–06 season, St Albans City beat Histon 2–0, in the Conference South play-off final at Broadhall Way to earn their first promotion to the Conference National. The club was unable to consolidate their position in the fifth tier and were relegated in bottom position. After relegation to the Conference South, St Albans struggled but would ultimately survive from another relegation. In Summer 2009, it was announced that Gibson's building firm, William Verry, were to go into administration. Gibson himself released a statement in regards to the club's future, stating that it was safe.

On 4 February 2011, the F.A. fined St Albans £7,500 and deducted 10 league points. The punishment was handed down to City chairman John Gibson and then vice-chairman Alasdair McMillin during a hotly disputed Regulatory Hearing at the Association's offices at Wembley, and was in relation to alleged illegal payments to contracted players who were not allowed petrol expenses for travelling from afar and consequently described by the FA as financial irregularities by the club during the 2008–09 season. St Albans were relegated to the Southern League Premier Division at the end of the 2010–11 season. On 12 May 2011, it was announced that local businessmen Lawrence Levy and John Mcgowan had bought the club from previous chairman John Gibson for an undisclosed fee. Now playing in the Southern League Premier Division for the first time in their history and at their lowest level for over 20 years, the club finished 8th. In the 2013–14 season, St Albans reached the first round of the FA Cup for the first time since 2002, losing 8–1 at home to League Two Mansfield Town in front of more than 3,000 supporters. St Albans finished the season in 4th place. In the play-offs, they defeated Chesham United 3–1 in the final to earn promotion to the Conference South. In their first season back in the division, they finished 13th.

The club reached the first round of the FA Cup in the 2016–17 season, losing 5–3 at home to League Two side Carlisle United. In the 2021–22 season, St Albans reached the first round of the FA Cup for the first time since 2016. They defeated League Two leaders Forest Green Rovers in the first round but lost to Hertfordshire rivals Boreham Wood in the second round. In the 2022–23 season, they finished 6th in the league on 75 points. After defeating Chelmsford City and then Dartford on penalties, St Albans faced Oxford City in the play-off final, losing 4–0. In the following season, manager David Noble joined Wealdstone in January 2024 and was later replaced by Jon Meakes. St Albans finished the season in 11th place. Following the end of the season David Noble was bought back as Head Coach with Meakes returning to his position as assistant.

== Sponsorship ==
Rock band, Enter Shikari, who are from St Albans, have been the main sponsor of St Albans City Football Club since 2020.

== Players ==
=== First-team squad ===
As of 22 October 2026

Note: Flags indicate national team as defined under FIFA eligibility rules; some limited exceptions apply. Players may hold more than one non-FIFA nationality.

| No. | Pos. | Nation | Player |
|---|---|---|---|
| 1 | GK | ENG | Sam Donkin |
| 2 | DF | IRL | Jack James |
| 3 | DF | ENG | Lewis Page |
| 4 | DF | ZAM | Frankie Musonda |
| 5 | MF | MSR | Alex Dyer |
| 6 | DF | ENG | Remi Sutton |
| 7 | FW | ENG | Kieran Petrie |
| 8 | MF | ENG | Jake Gray |
| 9 | FW | ENG | Inih Effiong |
| 11 | MF | ENG | Zane Banton (captain) |
| 13 | GK | ENG | Jake Boxer |

| No. | Pos. | Nation | Player |
|---|---|---|---|
| 14 | FW | NED | Sidney Turner |
| 15 | DF | ENG | Zak Sowden Fletcher |
| 17 | FW | ENG | Ollie Knight |
| 18 | FW | ENG | Samuel Ayolie (on loan from Stevenage) |
| 19 | FW | ENG | Kai Brown |
| 20 | FW | IRL | Mikey Faulkner |
| 25 | MF | NED | Darcy Turner |
| 26 | MF | ENG | Jai-Dea Moulton (on loan from Watford) |
| 27 | MF | ENG | Tobi Akinyimika (on loan from Watford) |
| 29 | DF | MSR | Darion Furlong |
| 30 | DF | IRL | Jake Grante |

==== Out on loan ====
Note: Flags indicate national team as defined under FIFA eligibility rules; some limited exceptions apply. Players may hold more than one non-FIFA nationality.

| No. | Pos. | Nation | Player |

== Coaching staff ==
As of 22 October 2026

- Manager: Gary McCann
- Assistant Manager: Danny Green
- Director of Football: Harry Wheeler
- Coach: Charlie Butcher
- Coach: Fabio Valenti
- Coach: Sam Day
- Goalkeeping Coach: Ryan Karrer
- Physio: Mark Findlay
- Kit & Equipment Manager: Oliver Arnold

== Records ==
Score lines

- Largest win: 14–0, vs. Aylesbury United, Spartan League, 19 October 1912
- Heaviest defeat: 11–0 vs. Wimbledon, Isthmian League, 9 November 1946
- Most goals in one match: 8–7 vs. Dulwich Hamlet, FA Cup fourth qualifying round replay, 22 November 1922
- Heaviest home defeat: 11–0 vs. Wimbledon, Isthmian League, 9 November 1946
- Largest away win: 10–0, 11–1 respectively
  - vs. Ruislip Manor, Mithras Cup second round, 24 November 1970
  - vs. Tufnell Spartans, Spartan League, 17 April 1920
- Heaviest away defeat: 10–0 vs. Hemel Hempstead Town, Herts Charity Cup, 4 November 2008

Attendance records

- Record home attendance: 9,757 vs. Ferryhill Athletic, Amateur Cup fourth round, 27 February 1926
- Record attendance (away): 15,850 vs. Wycombe Wanderers, Amateur Cup fourth round, 25 February 1950
- Lowest home attendance: 41 vs. Hoddesdon Town, Herts Senior Cup second round, 1 November 1999

Cup records

- Best FA Cup performance: Second round, 1968–69 (replay), 1980–81 (replay), 1996–97, 2021–22
- Best FA Trophy performance: Semi-finals, 1998–99
- Best FA Amateur Cup performance: Semi-finals, 1922–23, 1924–25 (replay), 1925–26, 1969–70 (replay)

== Honours ==
League

- Conference South (level 6)
  - Runners-up: 2005–06
- Isthmian League Premier Division
  - Champions: 1923–24, 1926–27, 1927–28
  - Runners-up: 1954–55, 1992–93
- Isthmian League Division One
  - Champions: 1985–86

Cup

- London Senior Cup
  - Winners: 1970–71
  - Runners-up: 1969–70
- Herts Senior Cup
  - Winners (17): 1924–25, 1928–29, 1934–35, 1943–44, 1946–47, 1950–51, 1954–55, 1955–56, 1956–57, 1965–66, 1967–68, 1968–69, 1999–2000, 2004–05, 2019–20, 2023–24
  - Runners-up (12): 1910–11, 1941–42, 1942–43, 1947–48, 1952–53, 1957–58, 1964–65, 1970–71, 1978–79, 1989–90, 1994–95, 2018–19
