= 2012–13 Luton Town F.C. season =

English football club season

Luton Town
2012–13 season
- Chairman: Nick Owen
- Manager: Paul Buckle (until 19 February 2013); Alan Neilson (caretaker manager until 26 February 2013); John Still (from 26 February 2013)
- Conference Premier: 7th
- FA Cup: Fifth round
- FA Trophy: Quarter-final
- Top goalscorer: League: Andre Gray (17); All: Andre Gray (20)
- Highest home attendance: 9,768 vs Millwall (FA Cup Fifth round, 16 February 2013)
- Lowest home attendance: 897 vs Dorchester Town (FA Trophy First round replay, 4 December 2012)
- Average home league attendance: 5,671
Home colours	Away colours	Third colours

The 2012–13 season was the 127th season in the history of Luton Town Football Club. The club competed in the Conference Premier for the fourth consecutive year, finishing in their lowest ever position of seventh place.

Manager Paul Buckle left the club on 19 February 2013 after a winless run of games left the club 14 points off the top of the table. Dagenham & Redbridge manager John Still was appointed in charge of Luton shortly afterwards, though could secure only a seventh-place finish in the league – worse than the previous season's lowest ever finish of fifth in the English football league system.

The club did, however, make history during the season by becoming the first non-League team to defeat a Premier League club in the FA Cup, beating Norwich City 1–0 at Carrow Road. The club eventually reached the fifth round of the competition, the furthest they had progressed since the 1993–94 season.

This article covers the period from 1 July 2012 to 30 June 2013.

== Background ==
After a 30-point deduction and consequent relegation in 2008–09 ended an 89-year stay in The Football League, Luton Town have attempted three unsuccessful campaigns for promotion out of non-League football, losing in the play-offs each time, most recently in a 2–1 defeat by York City at Wembley Stadium in May 2012. During that season, a seven-game winless run towards the end of the campaign left Luton outside the play-off places, resulting in manager Gary Brabin being replaced by Paul Buckle on a two-year contract. Buckle's tenure saw the club win five of their next eight games, qualify for the play-offs and beat Wrexham 3–2 on aggregate in the semi-final, before the loss to York in the final.

Stating his intention to reduce the size of the squad and "bring players into the club that are not failures", Buckle released a number of players in the close-season, including Ed Asafu-Adjaye, Charlie Henry, Christian Tavernier, Danny Crow, Dan Gleeson, Shane Blackett, and Amari Morgan-Smith, while Curtis Osano rejected a new contract to sign for League Two side AFC Wimbledon. Robbie Willmott and Godfrey Poku also rejected contracts, with Poku signing a deal to join Mansfield Town. Captain George Pilkington, too, elected to join Mansfield. Most notable was the departure of Keith Keane to League One side Preston North End after nine seasons with Luton in which he had made almost 300 appearances.

Luton signed various out-of-contract players themselves, with former Stevenage captain Ronnie Henry, Gillingham players Danny Spiller and Garry Richards (Richards' transfer becoming permanent on 1 July), and Gateshead striker Jon Shaw, who had scored 35 goals the previous season, all joining the club for free. The club also bought Wycombe Wanderers forward Scott Rendell for an undisclosed fee and made striker Andre Gray's loan from Hinckley United permanent, as he joined the club on a two-year contract for a fee of £30,000. Meanwhile, Jake Howells, JJ O'Donnell, Alex Lacey and Lewis Kidd signed contract extensions.

== Review ==
=== July ===
The transfers arranged for the beginning of the month became official, with Keith Keane, George Pilkington, Godfrey Poku and Robbie Willmott all leaving the club, and defender Garry Richards joining. On 2 July, Luton signed former Torquay United defender Lathaniel Rowe-Turner on a free transfer. A day later, former Luton goalkeeper Carl Emberson re-joined the club as first team development coach, linking back up with Paul Buckle, who he had been a coach with at Bristol Rovers. Midfielder Alex Lawless and youth team graduates Alasan Ann and Newman Carney signed one-year contract extensions on 4 July. This was followed by striker Dan Walker, who had previously rejected two contracts and been placed on the transfer list, signing a one-year deal himself on 5 July. Midfielder John Paul Kissock joined Macclesfield Town on loan for six months on 9 July. Iraqi midfielder Yaser Kasim joined Luton from Championship side Brighton & Hove Albion on a six-month loan on 12 July. The club's first friendly game was against local side Hitchin Town on 16 July, ending in a 1–0 victory to Luton. Three trialists played during the match; former Luton goalkeeper Dean Brill, ex-Southend United striker Harry Crawford, and 18-year-old former Leicester City youth midfielder Matt Robinson, who had been training with the club since the end of the 2011–12 season. Robinson impressed enough to be offered a two-year contract, which he signed on 18 July. Forward Aaron O'Connor left the club to join Newport County on a free transfer on 25 July. After further pre-season victories over lower league opposition, Luton drew 0–0 at home to League Two club Wycombe Wanderers before winning 2–0 against a strong Ipswich Town side of the Championship on 28 July. On the final day of July, Luton signed Brill on a two-year contract after he featured in goal for three friendlies. Brill had started his career at Luton, playing for the Hatters 97 times between 2003 and 2009.

=== August ===
On 1 August, Andre Boucaud joined League One side Notts County on loan until January 2013. Manager Paul Buckle had previously stated that "[Boucaud]'s not in our plans." Goalkeeper Lewis Kidd was loaned to Spartan South Midlands Football League side Dunstable Town on 4 August. Ronnie Henry was announced as Luton's captain for the season on 6 August. 18-year-old striker Jake Woolley, who had made his debut as a youth player in the previous season, signed a two-year professional contract on 10 August. Luton started their season once again with high expectations and as the bookmakers' favourite for promotion, but this impression was dealt a reality check within the first 35 minutes of their opening game against Gateshead on 11 August as they conceded two first-half goals, including one from former Luton striker Liam Hatch. Substitute Jon Shaw scored on his debut to halve the deficit, coincidentally against his former club, and a goal from Stuart Fleetwood meant Luton drew 2–2. A 2–0 away victory over Kidderminster Harriers came three days later, Fleetwood scoring both goals. Alasan Ann joined Southern Football League Premier side Kettering Town on a one-month loan on 16 August. On 17 August, Luton played against Hyde, coming from a goal down scored by former-Hatter Matthew Blinkhorn to win 2–1 courtesy of a first goal from midfielder JJ O'Donnell and Fleetwood's fourth of the season. Luton lost 1–0 at home to AFC Telford United on 25 August, Paul Buckle's first league defeat as manager in a game that saw Ronnie Henry and Telford defender Dan Preston shown red cards, which was swiftly followed two days later with a 3–1 win over Ebbsfleet United. Stuart Fleetwood scored his fifth and sixth goals of the season, with Scott Rendell getting his first goal for the club. Following on from the red cards in the game with Telford, both clubs were charged by the Football Association with failing to control their players. In addition, striker Jon Shaw, who began the incident but was not seen by the referee, was charged by the FA with violent conduct and banned for three matches. With defenders Ronnie Henry and Alex Lacey suspended and injured respectively, Luton signed Gillingham centre-back Connor Essam on a one-month loan on the day of the transfer deadline.

=== September ===
Luton began September strongly with a 4–1 home victory against Macclesfield Town, the goals coming from Jake Howells, Andre Gray, Scott Rendell and Stuart Fleetwood. A 3–2 win over local rivals Cambridge United followed three days later, Gray scoring again and defenders János Kovács and Dean Beckwith also on the scoresheet with goals from set pieces. Injuries to strikers Fleetwood and Rendell, plus Jon Shaw's suspension, led to Northampton Town forward Jake Robinson signing on a one-month loan on 7 September. He played in Luton's first away defeat of the season the next day, a heavy 3–0 loss to Alfreton Town which caused Paul Buckle to apologise for the performance to the Luton fans. Youth team graduate Newman Carney's contract was terminated by the club on 12 September, with the defender having failed to consistently appear for training. Luton drew 0–0 at home to Wrexham on 15 September, leaving them two points off the top of the table. This gap increased to five points six days later as Luton were heavily beaten 4–1 by Grimsby Town. Central defenders Kovács and Beckwith were both criticised in the defeat, the latter scoring an own goal and the former dropped from the first-team for Luton's next game against Tamworth on 25 September. Luton won the game 2–1 with goals from substitutes Yaser Kasim and Fleetwood. With the team still conceding goals from set-pieces, Buckle signed Guiseley and England C captain and centre-back Simon Ainge on a month's loan on 27 September. On the same day, left-back Greg Taylor and midfielder Adam Watkins, neither of whom had been playing in the first-team, were sent on one-month loans to Tamworth and Kidderminster Harriers respectively. Ainge partnered fellow loanee Connor Essam in central defence two days later as Luton beat Southport 3–1, with Kovács and Beckwith not even in the squad of 16 players. Fleetwood's ninth strike of the season and two goals from Rendell secured three points.

=== October ===
Connor Essam's loan from Gillingham was extended for a further month on 3 October. Luton beat Lincoln City 2–1 on 6 October with the Hatters' goals coming from Jon Shaw, his first since the opening day, and an own goal from Lincoln goalkeeper Paul Farman. Forward Jake Robinson and defender Simon Ainge both signed extensions to their loans shortly afterwards; Robinson for one month and Ainge for two. Additionally, Ainge's parent club Guiseley reached an agreement to sell him to Luton when the transfer window in January 2013. Luton lost 3–2 at home to Braintree Town on 9 October, with Stuart Fleetwood sent off for two bookable offences early in the first-half, both controversial, leaving Luton playing the majority of the game with ten men. Four days later, Luton defeated Nuneaton Town with both goals scored in the last five minutes by midfielder Alex Lawless. On 19 October, Luton signed Macclesfield Town's Guinea-Bissau international midfielder Arnaud Mendy on loan until January, at which point the transfer would become permanent. In exchange, Luton midfielder John Paul Kissock would join Macclesfield permanently. Luton beat local rivals Cambridge United 2–0 in the FA Cup to qualify for the first round with goals from strikers Andre Gray and Shaw. Luton came from behind on 27 October to beat Forest Green Rovers 2–1, with Fleetwood equalising for his tenth goal of the season and Scott Rendell netting a last-minute penalty.

=== November ===
On 3 November Luton scored a late equaliser in a 1–1 FA Cup first round draw against Nuneaton Town to earn a replay at Liberty Way. Two days later, Luton signed York City midfielder Jonathan Smith on a two-month loan. Luton lost 1–0 to Hereford United on 7 November and slipped to third in the league, four points behind leaders Newport County. The club then lost three days later at home to newly promoted Dartford, which saw them fall out of the play-off places and down to sixth in the table. Scott Rendell scored twice as Luton defeated Nuneaton 2–0 in their FA Cup replay on 13 November. They were drawn to play Dorchester Town in the second round, who were coincidentally also paired together in the FA Trophy draw. The teams drew 2–2 in their Trophy tie, meaning a replay was required in early December. In the league, Luton drew 2–2 away to Mansfield Town, with striker Andre Gray scoring both goals for the club.

=== December ===
Luton defeated Dorchester Town on 1 December in the FA Cup second round, and were drawn to play Championship side Wolverhampton Wanderers at Kenilworth Road in the third round. The club then played Dorchester again in their FA Trophy replay three days later, winning 3–1. The club defeated Alfreton Town 3–0 on 8 December to win for the first time in four attempts in the league, but were then comprehensively beaten 5–2 by Newport County at Rodney Parade just a few days later. Jonathan Smith was recalled by his parent club York City on 11 December, almost one month before his loan was due to end.

Luton progressed to the third round of the FA Trophy by defeating Matlock Town 2–1 on 15 December. Winger Scott Neilson was signed on a six-month contract from Crawley Town on 24 December, with the transfer going through officially on 1 January 2013. A series of postponements due to inclement weather meant Luton did not play again until 26 December, where they defeated Woking 3–1. Despite Jonathan Smith being recalled earlier in the month, Luton signed him from York on an 18-month contract on 29 December for a fee of £50,000.

=== January ===
On New Year's Day, Luton experienced their eighth league loss of the season, being beaten 3–1 by Woking in a reverse of the scoreline on Boxing Day. On 5 January, Luton beat Championship side Wolverhampton Wanderers, a side 59 positions higher than them in the league system, 1–0. The winning goal came 45 seconds after half-time, scored by midfielder Alex Lawless to put the club into the FA Cup fourth round for the first time since the 2006–07 season. Lawless later won the FA Cup player of the round award. The club beat bottom-of-the-table club Barrow 6–1 on 8 January, with Jon Shaw scoring a hat-trick. Four days later, Luton progressed to the quarter-finals of the FA Trophy by scoring two late goals against Skelmersdale United. Luton dropped out of the play-off places with a 0–0 draw away to AFC Telford United on 15 January, albeit with games in hand.

In terms of transfers, Luton sold Andre Boucaud to Notts County and John Paul Kissock to Macclesfield Town for undisclosed fees on 10 January, while the loans of Simon Ainge and Arnaud Mendy were made permanent. Unfavoured defender Dean Beckwith was released from his contract in early January to join Eastleigh in the Conference South. Alex Lacey also joined Eastleigh, but on a one-month loan, while striker Jake Woolley signed on loan for Southern Football League Premier Division side Hitchin Town. Striker Dan Walker joined Braintree Town on a one-month loan on 17 January.

Luton beat Premier League side Norwich City 1–0 away at Carrow Road on 26 January in the FA Cup fourth round, Scott Rendell's late goal ensuring that the club became the first non-League team in 24 years to defeat a top division side in the competition. This also marked the first time since the 1993–94 season that the club had progressed past the fourth round of the FA Cup.

The club signed winger Dave Martin on 29 January following his release from Southend United. Martin signed a contract until June 2014. Later the same day, Luton were knocked out of the FA Trophy by Grimsby Town in a 3–0 defeat. Following a long-term injury, winger James Dance joined Nuneaton Town on a one-month loan on 30 January. The next day, Luton signed Fleetwood Town central defender and captain Steve McNulty on an 18-month contract.

=== February ===
The club lost 1–0 away to Barrow on 2 February, and also had Lathaniel Rowe-Turner sent off for violent conduct late on. Luton signed experienced defender Wayne Thomas on a free transfer on 4 February. Midfielder Adam Watkins joined Eastleigh on loan until the end of the season on 11 February. The club were left further adrift from promotion following a home draw with Forest Green Rovers and an away defeat by Dartford in early February. The club's FA Cup run came to an end on 16 February at the fifth round after losing 3–0 to Millwall at Kenilworth Road in front of the largest crowd of the season.

Manager Paul Buckle left Luton by mutual consent on 19 February two hours before the game against Macclesfield Town. The club cited "genuine personal reasons" for the split and expressed that they wanted Buckle to remain at the club for the next season to ensure continuity after successive years of changing managers. Assistant manager Alan Neilson was placed in temporary charge of the team, who drew 1–1 with a Macclesfield team that played 70 minutes without a recognised goalkeeper. Luton remained winless in six league games after losing 3–2 at home to Mansfield four days later, Lindon Meikle scoring the winner in the last minute following a mix-up between defenders Steve McNulty and Rowe-Turner.

John Still left his long-standing managerial position at League Two club Dagenham & Redbridge to become the new Luton manager on 26 February. Alan Neilson again took charge of Luton's game that evening against Braintree Town, which they lost 2–0 to fall to tenth position in the table and 14 points off of the play-offs. Neilson apologised for the team's poor performance, stating "we're all in a real bad place, the players [and] myself".

=== March ===
John Still made his first signing on 1 March, loaning in-form striker Alex Wall from Conference South side Maidenhead United following injuries to regular strikers Jon Shaw and Scott Rendell, and illness to Andre Gray. Still's first game as Luton manager on 2 March saw the club win for the first time in eight games, beating Stockport County 1–0 with Jake Howells scoring the only goal of the match. This also marked the club's first away victory in the league for over four months. The club signed 19-year-old Millwall defender Jake Goodman on loan until the end of the season on 4 March. It was also announced that Terry Harris, John Still's deputy at Dagenham, was the club's new assistant manager. Goodman started in Luton's 0–0 away draw with Nuneaton Town on 5 March. Still signed Nigerian midfielder Solomon Taiwo, who he had worked with at Dagenham & Redbridge, on a free transfer on 7 March. Luton drew 1–1 on 9 March at home to Hereford United, Dave Martin scoring his first goal for the club. Meanwhile, winger James Dance rejoined Nuneaton on loan until the end of the season on 11 March. One day later, in a performance described by Still as having "no positives", Luton lost 2–1 at home to relegation-threatened Hyde in front of Kenilworth Road's lowest league crowd in over 11 years. The club then drew 0–0 with league leaders Wrexham on 16 March. Three days later, Luton won their second game under Still with a 1–0 home win over Stockport County, Steve McNulty scoring the winning goal. The same day, coaches Carl Emberson and Stuart Cash, who were hired by previous manager Paul Buckle, left the club with immediate effect. Luton drew 0–0 with Tamworth on 23 March, securing their fifth clean sheet in seven matches in the process. The club signed left-back Scott Griffiths on a contract until the end of the season two days later. Griffiths had previously played over 200 games for John Still at former club Dagenham & Redbridge. Defender Greg Taylor, who was dropped from the team following mistakes in the defeat by Hyde earlier in the month, joined Mansfield Town on loan until the end of the season on 28 March. Wayne Thomas also left the club on loan, joining League Two side Rochdale. John Still announced that, along with Taylor, five other out-of-contract players would leave Luton in the summer: central defender János Kovács, wingers Scott Neilson and James Dance, and strikers Alasan Ann and Stuart Fleetwood. In addition, midfielder Arnaud Mendy was placed on the transfer list. Luton drew 2–2 with fellow mid-table side Cambridge United on 30 March, Jon Shaw and Solomon Taiwo scoring the goals.

=== April ===
April began with Luton losing 2–1 at home to league leaders Kidderminster Harriers. The club then suffered their heaviest defeat in over four years with a 5–1 loss to Gateshead in what proved the lowest ever match attendance at a competitive Luton game; the game was played in front of only 382 fans. John Still did not attend the match, leaving assistant Terry Harris in charge while he instead scouted players for the 2013–14 season. The result saw Luton slip to 12th position in the table with relegation still a mathematical possibility, though this fear was allayed three days later as the club won 3–0 against Lincoln City. The next match saw Luton draw 1–1 with Grimsby Town, with the club described as playing "some of their best football of the season" and having 21 shots during the game. Leading scorer Andre Gray added two further goals to his season's total in a 2–2 home draw with promotion-chasing Newport County on 16 April. Luton then beat relegated Ebbsfleet United 2–0 two days later, Alex Wall scoring his first two goals for the club. Four players, Dean Brill, Simon Ainge, Lathaniel Rowe-Turner and Scott Rendell, were transfer listed following the game. Luton ended the season on 20 April with a 3–1 away win over Southport that meant they finished seventh in the league table. Matt Robinson scored his first senior goal and two further goals for Gray took his total for the season to 20.

Defender Scott Griffiths and striker Alex Wall signed one and two-year contracts respectively on 24 April. Steve McNulty, who had been captaining the side while Ronnie Henry was injured, signed a two-year contract extension on 29 April.

=== May ===
The club bought Southport players Shaun Whalley and Andrew Parry for undisclosed fees on 1 May, with the transfers planned to go through on 1 July 2013 when the transfer window opened. Both players signed two-year contracts. Midfielder Solomon Taiwo signed a one-year contract extension on 7 May, and player of the season Alex Lawless followed suit by signing a new two-year contract three days later after having talks with two unnamed League One clubs. The club signed young East Thurrock United goalkeeper Elliot Justham on a free transfer on 13 May. It was announced on 15 May that defender Wayne Thomas, goalkeeper Lewis Kidd and midfielder Adam Watkins had been released. Two days later, goalkeeper Mark Tyler signed a one-year contract extension and the club signed 21-year-old striker Mark Cullen, who had been released by Hull City. Luton signed left-back Danny Fitzsimons and midfielder Jim Stevenson from Conference North side Histon on 20 May, with both transfers coming into effect from 1 July. Fitzsimons had won three end-of-year awards at Histon, while Luton's scouts had informed John Still to "sign [Stevenson] straight away". It was announced on 24 May that striker Dan Walker would not be offered a new contract. He later signed for Hereford United, with the transfer becoming official on 1 July.

=== June ===
Young midfielder Matt Robinson agreed a one-year contract extension on 5 June, with winger Dave Martin signing a similar deal a few days later. The club signed out-of-contract defender Anthony Charles on a one-year agreement on 19 June.

== Match results ==
Luton Town results given first.

=== Legend ===
Win	Draw	Loss

=== Pre-season friendlies ===
16 July 2012	Hitchin Town	0–1	Luton Town	Top Field, Hitchin
19:45		Report	Watkins 42'	Attendance: 1,409

21 July 2012	AFC Dunstable	1–7	Luton Town	Creasey Park, Dunstable
15:00	Christie 46'	Report	Taylor 2'; Watkins 14'; Gray 28', 33'; Walker 42'; Lawless 45'; Fleetwood 62'	Attendance: 1,100

23 July 2012	St Albans City	0–2	Luton Town	Clarence Park, St Albans
19:45		Report	Rendell 34'; Fleetwood 36'	Attendance: 582

25 July 2012	Luton Town	0–0	Wycombe Wanderers	Kenilworth Road, Luton
19:30		Report		Attendance: 1,619

26 July 2012	Dunstable Town	1–0	Luton Town XI	Creasey Park, Dunstable
19:45	Roache 59'	Report		Attendance: 394

28 July 2012	Luton Town	2–0	Ipswich Town	Kenilworth Road, Luton
15:00	Kovács 39', 89'	Report		Attendance: 2,440

1 August 2012	Brackley Town	0–0	Luton Town	St James Park, Brackley
19:45		Report		Attendance: 332

3 August 2012	AFC Rushden & Diamonds	1–3	Luton Town XI	Dog & Duck Ground, Wellingborough
19:45	Ellwood 70'	Report	Walker 42', 67', 90+1'	Attendance: 346

4 August 2012	Luton Town	1–0	Leyton Orient	Kenilworth Road, Luton
15:00	Shaw 47'	Report		Attendance: 1,607

=== Conference Premier ===
==== Table ====
Pos	Team	Pld	W	D	L	GF	GA	GD	Pts	Promotion, qualification or relegation
5	Wrexham	46	22	14	10	74	45	+29	80	Qualification for the Conference Premier play-offs
6	Hereford United	46	19	13	14	73	63	+10	70	
7	Luton Town	46	18	13	15	70	62	+8	67	
8	Dartford	46	19	9	18	67	63	+4	66	
9	Braintree Town	46	19	9	18	63	72	−9	66	

Source: Football Conference
Rules for classification: 1) points; 2) goal difference; 3) number of goals scored.

==== Results by round ====
Round	1	2	3	4	5	6	7	8	9	10	11	12	13	14	15	16	17	18	19	20	21	22	23	24	25	26	27	28	29	30	31	32	33	34	35	36	37	38	39	40	41	42	43	44	45	46
Ground	H	A	A	H	A	H	H	A	H	A	A	H	A	H	H	A	A	H	A	H	A	H	A	H	A	A	H	A	A	H	A	A	A	H	H	A	H	H	A	H	A	H	H	H	H	A
Result	D	W	W	L	W	W	W	L	D	L	W	W	W	L	W	W	L	L	D	W	L	W	L	W	D	L	D	L	D	L	L	W	D	D	L	D	W	D	D	L	L	W	D	D	W	W
Position	11	4	3	9	5	3	2	5	5	6	5	4	4	4	3	2	3	6	6	5	5	4	5	5	6	7	7	7	8	8	10	8	7	8	8	11	8	8	9	9	12	9	8	11	9	7

Updated to match(es) played on 21 April 2013. Source: bbc.co.uk
A = Away; H = Home; W = Win; D = Draw; L = Loss

==== Fixtures and results ====
11 August 2012 1	Luton Town	2–2	Gateshead	Kenilworth Road, Luton
15:00	Shaw 61'; Fleetwood 71'	Report	Hatch 25'; Odubade 35'	Attendance: 6,743

14 August 2012 2	Kidderminster Harriers	0–2	Luton Town	Aggborough, Kidderminster
19:45		Report	Fleetwood 22', 30'	Attendance: 2,275

17 August 2012 3	Hyde	1–2	Luton Town	Ewen Fields, Hyde
19:30	Blinkhorn 55'	Report	O'Donnell 68'; Fleetwood 78'	Attendance: 1,141

25 August 2012 4	Luton Town	0–1	AFC Telford United	Kenilworth Road, Luton
15:00	Henry (red card) 81'	Report	St Aimie 42'; Preston (red card) 78'; Reid (red card) 82'	Attendance: 5,970

27 August 2012 5	Ebbsfleet United	1–3	Luton Town	Stonebridge Road, Northfleet
15:00	Elder 86'	Report	Fleetwood 10', 73'; Rendell 19'	Attendance: 2,018

1 September 2012 6	Luton Town	4–1	Macclesfield Town	Kenilworth Road, Luton
15:00	Howells 1'; Gray 17'; Rendell 82'; Fleetwood 90+3'	Report	Brown 51'	Attendance: 5,803

4 September 2012 7	Luton Town	3–2	Cambridge United	Kenilworth Road, Luton
19:45	Kovács 18'; Gray 52'; Beckwith 71'	Report	Wellard 13'; McAuley 88'	Attendance: 6,592

8 September 2012 8	Alfreton Town	3–0	Luton Town	North Street, Alfreton
15:00	Wilson 2', 66'; Bradley 23'	Report		Attendance: 1,392

15 September 2012 9	Luton Town	0–0	Wrexham	Kenilworth Road, Luton
15:00		Report		Attendance: 6,675

21 September 2012 10	Grimsby Town	4–1	Luton Town	Blundell Park, Cleethorpes
19:45	Colbeck 8'; Cook 40'; Hannah 43'; Beckwith (o.g.) 71'	Report	Rendell 76'	Attendance: 4,074

25 September 2012 11	Tamworth	1–2	Luton Town	The Lamb Ground, Tamworth
19:45	Dempster 22'	Report	Kasim 63'; Fleetwood 66'	Attendance: 1,137

29 September 2012 12	Luton Town	3–1	Southport	Kenilworth Road, Luton
15:00	Fleetwood 4'; Rendell 46', 50' (pen.)	Report	Parry 45'	Attendance: 5,696

6 October 2012 13	Lincoln City	1–2	Luton Town	Sincil Bank, Lincoln
15:00	Taylor 58'	Report	Farman (o.g.) 28'; Shaw 48'	Attendance: 2,970

9 October 2012 14	Luton Town	2–3	Braintree Town	Kenilworth Road, Luton
19:45	Fleetwood (yellow card) 27' (yellow-red card); Ainge 36'; Walker 57'	Report	Holman 6'; Marks 31'; Paine 66'	Attendance: 5,523

13 October 2012 15	Luton Town	2–0	Nuneaton Town	Kenilworth Road, Luton
15:00	Lawless 86', 90+3'	Report		Attendance: 6,148

27 October 2012 16	Forest Green Rovers	1–2	Luton Town	The New Lawn, Nailsworth
15:00	Klukowski 47'; Green (red card) 90'	Report	Fleetwood 74'; Rendell 90+1' (pen.)	Attendance: 2,112

6 November 2012 17	Hereford United	1–0	Luton Town	Edgar Street, Hereford
19:45	McQuilkin 54'	Report		Attendance: 2,108

10 November 2012 18	Luton Town	0–2	Dartford	Kenilworth Road, Luton
15:00		Report	Bradbrook 6'; Bonner 41'	Attendance: 6,567

18 November 2012 19	Mansfield Town	2–2	Luton Town	Field Mill, Mansfield
13:00	Hutchinson 8'; Green 84'	Report	Gray 26', 67'	Attendance: 2,619

8 December 2012 20	Luton Town	3–0	Alfreton Town	Kenilworth Road, Luton
15:00	O'Donnell 53'; Smith 56'; Gray 58'	Report		Attendance: 5,648

11 December 2012 21	Newport County	5–2	Luton Town	Rodney Parade, Newport
19:45	O'Connor 12'; Jolley 22', 67'; Henry (o.g.) 38'; Sandell 63'	Report	Gray 16'; Shaw 60'	Attendance: 2,247

26 December 2012 22	Luton Town	3–1	Woking	Kenilworth Road, Luton
15:00	Kovács 15'; Shaw 37'; Rendell 82' (pen.)	Report	McNerney 71'	Attendance: 6,744

1 January 2013 23	Woking	3–1	Luton Town	Kingfield Stadium, Woking
13:00	Knott 3', 74'; Stockley 78'	Report	Gray 8'	Attendance: 2,961

8 January 2013 24	Luton Town	6–1	Barrow	Kenilworth Road, Luton
19:45	Neilson 2'; Kovács 27'; Shaw 28', 59', 64'; Gray 72'	Report	Boyes 68'	Attendance: 5,165

15 January 2013 25	AFC Telford United	0–0	Luton Town	New Bucks Head, Telford
19:45		Report		Attendance: 1,606

2 February 2013 26	Barrow	1–0	Luton Town	Holker Street, Barrow-in-Furness
15:00	Boyes 5'	Report	Rowe-Turner (red card) 90+1'	Attendance: 1,188

9 February 2013 27	Luton Town	1–1	Forest Green Rovers	Kenilworth Road, Luton
15:00	Gray 5' (penalty missed) 35'; Lawless (yellow card) 53' (yellow-red card)	Report	Taylor 13'; Al Bangura (red card) 66'	Attendance: 6,374

12 February 2013 28	Dartford	1–0	Luton Town	Princes Park, Dartford
19:45	Hayes 72'	Report		Attendance: 1,802

19 February 2013 29	Macclesfield Town	1–1	Luton Town	Moss Rose, Macclesfield
19:45	Taylor (red card) 21'; Fairhurst 76'	Report	Gray 15'	Attendance: 1,984

23 February 2013 30	Luton Town	2–3	Mansfield Town	Kenilworth Road, Luton
15:00	Rendell 36'; Gray 47'	Report	Green 32' (pen.); Daniel 44'; Meikle 90'	Attendance: 5,968

26 February 2013 31	Braintree Town	2–0	Luton Town	Cressing Road, Braintree
19:45	Marks 42'; Davis 49'; Paine (red card) 20'	Report	Thomas (red card) 33'	Attendance: 1,003

2 March 2013 32	Stockport County	0–1	Luton Town	Edgeley Park, Stockport
15:00		Report	Fleetwood (penalty missed) 25'; Howells 45+2'	Attendance: 4,074

5 March 2013 33	Nuneaton Town	0–0	Luton Town	Liberty Way, Nuneaton
19:45		Report		Attendance: 1,173

9 March 2013 34	Luton Town	1–1	Hereford United	Kenilworth Road, Luton
15:00	Martin 87'	Report	Jackson 23'	Attendance: 6,001

12 March 2013 35	Luton Town	1–2	Hyde	Kenilworth Road, Luton
19:45	Howells 37'	Report	Almond 19'; Milligan 70' (pen.)	Attendance: 4,847

16 March 2013 36	Wrexham	0–0	Luton Town	Racecourse Ground, Wrexham
15:00		Report		Attendance: 3,907

19 March 2013 37	Luton Town	1–0	Stockport County	Kenilworth Road, Luton
19:45	McNulty 44'	Report		Attendance: 5,106

23 March 2013 38	Luton Town	0–0	Tamworth	Kenilworth Road, Luton
15:00		Report		Attendance: 5,501

30 March 2013 39	Cambridge United	2–2	Luton Town	Abbey Stadium, Cambridge
15:00	T. Shaw 20'; Blissett 61'	Report	J. Shaw 53'; Taiwo 65' (pen.)	Attendance: 3,217

1 April 2013 40	Luton Town	1–2	Kidderminster Harriers	Kenilworth Road, Luton
15:00	Gray 83'	Report	Gowling 13'; Malbon 35'	Attendance: 6,108

6 April 2013 41	Gateshead	5–1	Luton Town	Brunton Park, Carlisle
15:00	Donaldson 12', 66'; Gillies 15', 45' (pen.); Hatch 90+3'	Report	Walker 35'	Attendance: 382

9 April 2013 42	Luton Town	3–0	Lincoln City	Kenilworth Road, Luton
19:45	Martin 41', 72'; Gray 43'	Report		Attendance: 5,393

12 April 2013 43	Luton Town	1–1	Grimsby Town	Kenilworth Road, Luton
19:45	Lawless 76'	Report	Southwell 54'	Attendance: 5,662

16 April 2013 44	Luton Town	2–2	Newport County	Kenilworth Road, Luton
19:45	Gray 12', 79'	Report	Jolley 52', 84'	Attendance: 5,125

18 April 2013 45	Luton Town	2–0	Ebbsfleet United	Kenilworth Road, Luton
19:45	Wall 4', 77'	Report		Attendance: 5,934

20 April 2013 46	Southport	1–3	Luton Town	Haig Avenue, Southport
17:15	Clancy 2'	Report	Robinson 30'; Gray 34', 82'	Attendance: 1,406

=== FA Cup ===
20 October 2012 4Q	Cambridge United	0–2	Luton Town	Abbey Stadium, Cambridge
13:00		Report	Gray 7'; Shaw 72'	Attendance: 2,321

3 November 2012 1R	Luton Town	1–1	Nuneaton Town	Kenilworth Road, Luton
15:00	Rendell 84'	Report	Waite 20'	Attendance: 3,089

13 November 2012 1R Replay	Nuneaton Town	0–2	Luton Town	Liberty Way, Nuneaton
19:45		Report	Rendell 22', 72' (pen.)	Attendance: 1,596

1 December 2012 2R	Luton Town	2–1	Dorchester Town	Kenilworth Road, Luton
15:00	Gray 30'; Lawless 68'	Report	Pugh 71'	Attendance: 3,287

5 January 2012 3R	Luton Town	1–0	Wolverhampton Wanderers	Kenilworth Road, Luton
15:00	Lawless 46'	Report		Attendance: 9,638

26 January 2013 4R	Norwich City	0–1	Luton Town	Carrow Road, Norwich
15:00		Report	Rendell 80'	Attendance: 26,521

16 February 2013 5R	Luton Town	0–3	Millwall	Kenilworth Road, Luton
12:45		Report	Henry 12'; Hulse 36'; N'Guessan 86'	Attendance: 9,768

=== FA Trophy ===
27 November 2012 1R	Dorchester Town	2–2	Luton Town	Avenue Stadium, Dorchester
19:45	Jermyn 58'; Clough 90+2'	Report	Martin (o.g.) 1'; Fleetwood 78'	Attendance: 688

4 December 2012 1R Replay	Luton Town	3–1	Dorchester Town	Kenilworth Road, Luton
19:45	O'Donnell 11'; Walker 17', 70'	Report	Thompson 86'	Attendance: 897
Note: Lowest attendance in Luton Town's history.

15 December 2012 2R	Matlock Town	1–2	Luton Town	Causeway Lane, Matlcock
15:00	McMahon 62' (pen.)	Report	Ainge 17'; Shaw 90+2'	Attendance: 823

12 January 2013 3R	Luton Town	2–0	Skelmersdale United	Kenilworth Road, Luton
15:00	Watkins 84'; Gray 90'	Report		Attendance: 2,479

29 January 2013 QF	Grimsby Town	3–0	Luton Town	Blundell Park, Grimsby
19:45	Devitt 8'; Cook 75'; Marshall 78'	Report		Attendance: 2,791

== Player statistics ==
Correct as of 21 April 2013. Players with a zero in every column only appeared as unused substitutes.

No.	Pos.	Name	League		FA Cup		FA Trophy		Total		Discipline	
No.	Pos.	Name	Apps	Goals	Apps	Goals	Apps	Goals	Apps	Goals	Yellow card	Red card
1	GK	(England) Mark Tyler	39	0	6	0	1	0	46	0	1	0
2	DF	(England) Lathaniel Rowe-Turner	32 (5)	0	6	0	4 (1)	0	42 (6)	0	2	1
3	DF	(England) Greg Taylor	13 (4)	0	3	0	0	0	16 (4)	0	1	0
4	DF	(England) Garry Richards	0	0	0	0	0	0	0	0	0	0
5	DF	(England) Dean Beckwith	8	1	1 (1)	0	0	0	8 (1)	1	3	0
5	DF	(England) Steve McNulty	20	1	0	0	0	0	20	1	3	0
6	DF	(Hungary) János Kovács	19 (1)	3	7	0	3	0	29 (1)	3	6	0
7	MF	(Wales) Alex Lawless	35 (2)	3	6	2	5	0	46 (2)	5	8	1
8	MF	(England) Danny Spiller	0	0	0	0	0	0	0	0	0	0
9	FW	(England) Jon Shaw	26 (5)	8	3 (1)	1	2 (1)	1	31 (7)	10	1	0
10	FW	(England) Scott Rendell	29 (8)	8	4 (2)	4	4	0	37 (10)	12	3	0
11	MF	(Wales) Jake Howells	34 (7)	3	6	0	4 (1)	0	44 (8)	3	4	0
12	DF	(England) Simon Ainge	19 (3)	1	0	0	4 (1)	1	23 (4)	2	3	0
13	FW	(Wales) Stuart Fleetwood	19 (11)	10	2 (4)	0	1 (4)	1	22 (19)	11	4	1
14	MF	(Guinea-Bissau) Arnaud Mendy	16 (2)	0	6 (1)	0	3	0	25 (3)	0	8	0
15	MF	(England) Adam Watkins	2 (3)	0	0 (1)	0	1 (2)	1	3 (6)	1	0	0
16	DF	(England) Alex Lacey	0	0	0 (1)	0	1	0	1 (1)	0	0	0
17	MF	(England) JJ O'Donnell	20 (8)	2	6 (1)	0	4	1	30 (9)	2	3	0
18	MF	(Iraq) Yaser Kasim	5 (6)	1	0	0	0	0	5 (6)	1	2	0
18	MF	(England) Dave Martin	14 (2)	3	0	0	0	0	14 (2)	3	1	0
19	MF	(England) James Dance	0	0	0 (1)	0	2 (1)	0	2 (2)	0	0	0
20	MF	(Wales) Scott Neilson	6 (2)	1	0	0	0	0	6 (2)	1	1	0
21	GK	(England) Lewis Kidd	0	0	0	0	0	0	0	0	0	0
22	FW	(England) Jake Robinson	2 (4)	0	0 (2)	0	0	0	2 (6)	0	0	0
22	DF	(England) Wayne Thomas	2	0	0	0	0	0	2	0	0	1
23	MF	(England) Matt Robinson	6 (4)	1	0 (2)	0	2	0	8 (6)	1	2	0
24	DF	(England) Connor Essam	5 (4)	0	0	0	0	0	5 (4)	0	2	0
24	MF	(England) Jonathan Smith	26 (2)	1	4	0	2	0	32 (2)	1	6	0
25	DF	(England) Ronnie Henry (captain)	33	0	7	0	3	0	43	0	4	1
26	FW	(England) Alex Wall	5 (7)	2	0	0	0	0	5 (7)	2	0	0
27	FW	(England) Andre Gray	39 (5)	17	7	2	2 (1)	1	48 (6)	20	5	0
28	FW	(England) Jake Woolley	0 (4)	0	0 (1)	0	0 (1)	0	0 (6)	0	0	0
29	FW	(England) Dan Walker	2 (10)	2	2	0	2	2	6 (10)	4	0	0
30	DF	(England) Jake Goodman	11	0	0	0	0	0	11	0	1	0
31	MF	(Nigeria) Solomon Taiwo	8 (1)	1	0	0	0	0	8 (1)	1	2	0
32	FW	(England) Alasan Ann	0	0	0	0	0	0	0	0	0	0
33	GK	(England) Dean Brill	7	0	1	0	4	0	12	0	0	0
35	DF	(England) Jerome Jibodu	0	0	0	0	1	0	1	0	0	0
37	DF	(England) Scott Griffiths	4 (2)	0	0	0	0	0	4 (2)	0	0	0
38	GK	(England) Ben McFarlane-Barnes	0	0	0	0	0	0	0	0	0	0
41	MF	(England) Charlie Smith	0	0	0	0	0	0	0	0	0	0
42	DF	(England) Brett Longden	0	0	0	0	0	0	0	0	0	0

== Managerial statistics ==
Only competitive games from the 2012–13 season are included.
Correct as of 21 April 2013.

Name	Nat.	From	To	Record								Honours
Name	Nat.	From	To	PLD	W	D	L	GF	GA	GD	W%	Honours
Paul Buckle	(England)	8 April 2012	19 February 2013	40	21	7	12	66	52	+14	52.5	
Alan Neilson (caretaker manager)	(Wales)	19 February 2013	26 February 2013	3	0	1	2	3	6	−3	0.0	
John Still^{[A]}	(England)	26 February 2013	Present	15	5	7	3	19	16	+3	33.3	–
Total				58	26	15	17	88	74	+14	44.8	

== Transfers ==
=== In ===
Date	Player	From	Fee	Notes
1 July 2012	(England) Garry Richards	Gillingham	Free	
2 July 2012	(England) Lathaniel Rowe-Turner	Torquay United	Free	
18 July 2012	(England) Matt Robinson	Unattached		
31 July 2012	(England) Dean Brill	Unattached		
1 January 2013	(Wales) Scott Neilson	Crawley Town	Free	
1 January 2013	(England) Jonathan Smith	York City	£50,000	
2 January 2013	(England) Simon Ainge	Guiseley	Undisclosed	
10 January 2013	(Guinea-Bissau) Arnaud Mendy	Macclesfield Town	Undisclosed	
29 January 2013	(England) Dave Martin	Unattached		
31 January 2013	(England) Steve McNulty	Fleetwood Town	Free	
4 February 2013	(England) Wayne Thomas	Unattached		
7 March 2013	(Nigeria) Solomon Taiwo	Unattached		
25 March 2013	(England) Scott Griffiths	Unattached		
24 April 2013	(England) Alex Wall	Maidenhead United	Free	
14 May 2013	(England) Elliot Justham	East Thurrock	Free	
17 May 2013	(England) Mark Cullen	Hull City	Free	
19 June 2013	(England) Anthony Charles	Unattached		

=== Out ===
Date	Player	To	Fee	Notes
1 July 2012	(Republic of Ireland) Keith Keane	Preston North End	Free	
1 July 2012	(England) George Pilkington	Mansfield Town	Free	
1 July 2012	(England) Godfrey Poku	Mansfield Town	Undisclosed^{[B]}	
1 July 2012	(England) Robbie Willmott	Cambridge United	Free	
7 July 2012	(Republic of Ireland) Fred Murray	Released		
25 July 2012	(England) Aaron O'Connor	Newport County	Free	
12 September 2012	(England) Newman Carney	Released		
8 January 2013	(England) Dean Beckwith	Eastleigh	Free	
10 January 2013	(Trinidad and Tobago) Andre Boucaud	Notts County	Undisclosed	
10 January 2013	(England) John Paul Kissock	Macclesfield Town	Undisclosed	
27 February 2013	(England) Tyler Reading	Norwich City	Undisclosed	
4 April 2013	(England) Nick Burtenshaw	Released		
4 April 2013	(England) Josh Carpenter	Released		
4 April 2013	(England) Jordan Davis	Released		
4 April 2013	(England) Jerry Nash	Released		
22 April 2013	(England) Alasan Ann	Released		
22 April 2013	(England) James Dance	Released		
22 April 2013	(Wales) Stuart Fleetwood	Released		
22 April 2013	(Hungary) János Kovács	Released		
22 April 2013	(Wales) Scott Neilson	Released		
22 April 2013	(England) Greg Taylor	Released		
14 May 2013	(England) Ollie Cole	Norwich City	Undisclosed	
15 May 2013	(England) Lewis Kidd	Released		
15 May 2013	(England) Wayne Thomas	Released		
15 May 2013	(England) Adam Watkins	Released		

=== Loans in ===
Date	Player	From	End date	Notes
12 July 2012	(Iraq) Yaser Kasim	Brighton & Hove Albion	17 December 2012	
31 August 2012	(England) Connor Essam	Gillingham	2 November 2012	
7 September 2012	(England) Jake Robinson	Northampton Town	8 November 2012	
27 September 2012	(England) Simon Ainge	Guiseley	2 January 2013	
19 October 2012	(Guinea-Bissau) Arnaud Mendy	Macclesfield Town	10 January 2013	
5 November 2012	(England) Jonathan Smith	York City	11 December 2012	
1 March 2013	(England) Alex Wall	Maidenhead United	22 April 2013	
4 March 2013	(England) Jake Goodman	Millwall	22 April 2013	

=== Loans out ===
Date	Player	To	End date	Notes
9 July 2012	(England) John Paul Kissock	Macclesfield Town	10 January 2013	
1 August 2012	(Trinidad and Tobago) Andre Boucaud	Notts County	4 January 2013	
4 August 2012	(England) Lewis Kidd	Dunstable Town	29 October 2012	
16 August 2012	(England) Alasan Ann	Kettering Town	17 September 2012	
31 August 2012	(England) Jerry Nash	Leighton Town	11 February 2013	
27 September 2012	(England) Greg Taylor	Tamworth	3 December 2012	
27 September 2012	(England) Adam Watkins	Kidderminster Harriers	31 October 2012	
7 December 2012	(England) Jordan Davis	Hitchin Town	7 January 2013	
11 December 2012	(England) Lewis Kidd	Banbury United	16 January 2013	
8 January 2013	(England) Alex Lacey	Eastleigh	13 February 2013	
8 January 2013	(England) Jake Woolley	Hitchin Town	13 February 2013	
17 January 2013	(England) Dan Walker	Braintree Town	25 February 2013	
24 January 2013	(England) Alasan Ann	Hitchin Town	26 February 2013	
30 January 2013	(England) James Dance	Nuneaton Town	26 February 2013	
31 January 2013	(England) Jordan Davis	Leighton Town	26 February 2013	
11 February 2013	(England) Adam Watkins	Eastleigh	6 May 2013	
18 February 2013	(England) Alex Lacey	Eastleigh	6 May 2013	
18 February 2013	(England) Jake Woolley	Hitchin Town	23 March 2013	
11 March 2013	(England) James Dance	Nuneaton Town	22 April 2013	
14 March 2013	(England) Lewis Kidd	Hertford Town	29 April 2013	
28 March 2013	(England) Greg Taylor	Mansfield Town	22 April 2013	
28 March 2013	(England) Wayne Thomas	Rochdale	29 April 2013	

== Honours ==
=== Team ===
- Luton won the FA Ronnie Radford Award, given to the team that performed the most impressive 'giant-killing' in the FA Cup, for their 1–0 victory over Norwich City on 26 January 2013.

=== Individuals ===
Name	Country	Number	Position	Award	Source
Alex Lawless	Wales	7	Midfielder	Luton Town Supporters Club Player of the Year	
Alex Lawless	Wales	7	Midfielder	Players' Player of the Year	
Scott Rendell	England	10	Striker	Goal of the Season^{[C]}	
Andre Gray	England	27	Striker	FA Cup Player of the Round (Fourth round qualifying)	
Alex Lawless	Wales	7	Midfielder	FA Cup Player of the Round (third round)	
Scott Rendell	England	10	Striker	FA Cup Player of the Round (fourth round)	

== Footnotes ==
A. Assistant manager Terry Harris took charge of Luton's 5–1 defeat by Gateshead as manager John Still was scouting players for the next season.
B. Despite Godfrey Poku's contract coming to an end and therefore entitling another club to sign him on a free transfer, as he is under the age of 24 Luton were entitled to compensation in the form of a development fee from Mansfield Town, decided by tribunal.
C. The Goal of the Season award was given to Scott Rendell for his winning goal against Norwich City in the FA Cup on 26 January 2013.

== See also ==
- 2012–13 in English football
- 2012–13 Football Conference
