= Norwich City F.C. 0–1 Luton Town F.C. (2013) =

Norwich City 0–1 Luton Town
- Event: 2012–13 FA Cup
Norwich City	Luton Town
0	1
- Date: 26 January 2013
- Venue: Carrow Road, Norwich
- Referee: Andre Marriner
- Attendance: 26,521

Norwich City vs Luton Town was an FA Cup fourth round tie, played on 26 January 2013 at Carrow Road, Norwich. Luton won the match 1–0. This was the first time in the Premier League era that a top division side was beaten by a non-League team, and the first time since Altrincham beat Birmingham City at St. Andrew's in 1986 that this feat was achieved at the home of the top-flight team. The last team to beat a top division side from the Conference was Sutton United when they beat Coventry City in 1989. Luton became the seventh non-League team since World War II to reach the fifth round of the FA Cup.

== Route to the Match ==
=== Norwich City ===
5 January 2013 Third round	Peterborough United	0–3	Norwich City	Peterborough
15:00 GMT		Report	E. Bennett 30'; Jackson 41'; Snodgrass 70'	Stadium: London Road; Attendance: 13,198; Referee: Stuart Attwell

=== Luton Town ===
20 October 2012 Fourth qualifying round	Cambridge United	0–2	Luton Town	Cambridge
13:00		Report	Gray 7'; Shaw 72'	Stadium: Abbey Stadium; Attendance: 2,321

3 November 2012 First round	Luton Town	1–1	Nuneaton Town	Luton
15:00	Rendell 84'	Report	Waite 20'	Stadium: Kenilworth Road; Attendance: 3,089

13 November 2012 First round (replay)	Nuneaton Town	0–2	Luton Town	Nuneaton
19:45		Report	Rendell 22', 72' (pen.)	Stadium: Liberty Way; Attendance: 1,596

1 December 2012 Second round	Luton Town	2–1	Dorchester Town	Luton
15:00	Gray 30'; Lawless 68'	Report	Pugh 71'	Stadium: Kenilworth Road; Attendance: 3,287

5 January 2013 Third round	Luton Town	1–0	Wolverhampton Wanderers	Luton
15:00	Lawless 46'	Report		Stadium: Kenilworth Road; Attendance: 9,638

== Match summary ==
26 January 2013
15:00

Norwich City	0–1	Luton Town
	Report	Rendell 80'

Carrow Road, Norwich
Attendance: 26,521
Referee: Andre Marriner (West Midlands)

Norwich City	Luton Town

GK	13	(England) Declan Rudd
DF	2	(Scotland) Russell Martin (c)
DF	18	(Spain) Javier Garrido
DF	20	(England) Leon Barnett
DF	24	(England) Ryan Bennett
MF	8	(England) Jonny Howson
MF	11	(England) Andrew Surman	(substituted off) 72'
MF	15	(England) David Fox
MF	17	(England) Elliott Bennett	(substituted off) 73'
FW	10	(Canada) Simeon Jackson
FW	37	(England) Harry Kane	(substituted off) 46'
Substitute:
GK	28	(England) Mark Bunn
DF	3	(Scotland) Steven Whittaker
DF	6	(England) Michael Turner
MF	12	(Republic of Ireland) Anthony Pilkington	(substituted on) 73'
MF	14	(Republic of Ireland) Wes Hoolahan	(substituted on) 72'
MF	27	(Norway) Alexander Tettey
FW	9	(England) Grant Holt	(substituted on) 46'
Manager:
(Republic of Ireland) Chris Hughton

GK	1	(England) Mark Tyler
DF	2	(England) Lathaniel Rowe-Turner
DF	3	(England) Greg Taylor
DF	6	(Hungary) János Kovács
DF	25	(England) Ronnie Henry (c)
MF	11	(Wales) Jake Howells
MF	7	(Wales) Alex Lawless
MF	14	(Guinea-Bissau) Arnaud Mendy	(substituted off) 68'
MF	24	(England) Jonathan Smith
FW	9	(England) Jon Shaw	(substituted off) 74'
FW	27	(England) Andre Gray	(substituted off) 75'
Substitute:
GK	33	(England) Dean Brill
MF	15	(England) Adam Watkins
MF	17	(England) JJ O'Donnell	(substituted on) 68'
MF	19	(England) James Dance
MF	23	(England) Matt Robinson
FW	10	(England) Scott Rendell	(substituted on) 74'
FW	13	(Wales) Stuart Fleetwood	(substituted on) 75'
Manager:
(England) Paul Buckle

== Match Statistics ==
	Norwich City	Luton Town
Goals scored	0	1
Total shots	11	6
Shots on target	6	2
Ball possession	49%	51%
Corner kicks	4	2
Fouls committed	5	9
Yellow cards	0	0
Red cards	0	0

== Match reports ==
- BBC
- ITV
- Luton Town
- Norwich City
- Sky
- The Guardian
- The Telegraph
