= Lathaniel Rowe-Turner =

English association football player

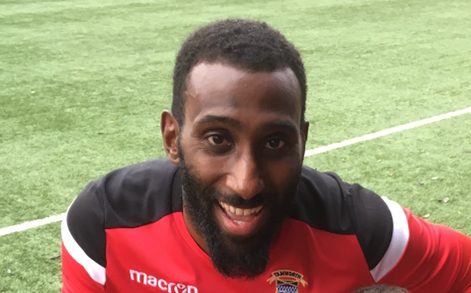
- Rowe-Turner in October 2019

Personal information
- Full name: Lathaniel Alanzo Rowe-Turner
- Date of birth: 12 November 1989 (age 36)
- Place of birth: Leicester, England
- Height: 6 ft 1 in (1.85 m)
- Position: Defender

Team information
- Current team: Rugby Borough

Youth career
- 2004–2008: Leicester City

Senior career*
Years	Team	Apps	(Gls)
2008–2010	Leicester City	0	(0)
2008	→ Cheltenham Town (loan)	1	(0)
2009	→ Redditch United (loan)	0	(0)
2009	→ King's Lynn (loan)	11	(0)
2010–2012	Torquay United	35	(1)
2012–2014	Luton Town	37	(0)
2013–2014	→ Alfreton Town (loan)	22	(0)
2014	→ Alfreton Town (loan)	8	(0)
2014–2015	Alfreton Town	44	(1)
2015–2016	Kidderminster Harriers	19	(0)
2016	→ Nuneaton Town (loan)	16	(0)
2016–2017	Torquay United	46	(0)
2017–2018	Chester	29	(0)
2018–2019	Kettering Town	30	(1)
2019–2021	Tamworth	34	(0)
2021–2022	Stourbridge	21	(1)
2022–2024	Nuneaton Borough	60	(0)
2024	Kettering Town	16	(0)
2024–2025	Barwell	44	(0)
2025–2026	Racing Club Warwick		
2026–	Rugby Borough		
- * Club domestic league appearances and goals as of 20:00, 12 April 2026 (GMT)

Lathaniel Alanzo Rowe-Turner (born 12 November 1989) is an English semi-professional footballer who plays as a defender for Northern Premier League Division One Midlands club Rugby Borough.

== Career ==
=== Leicester City ===
Born in Leicester, Leicestershire, Rowe-Turner started his career in the Leicester City academy.

On 16 October 2008, Rowe-Turner joined League One club Cheltenham Town on a one-month loan, linking up again with former Leicester manager Martin Allen. He made his professional debut and only appearance in a 2–0 away defeat to Tranmere Rovers on 21 October 2008, playing the entire match.

On 23 February 2009, Rowe-Turner joined Redditch United on a one-month loan.

On 18 September 2009, Rowe-Turner joined King's Lynn on a one-month loan.

=== Torquay United ===
On 1 February 2010, Rowe-Turner signed for League Two club Torquay United for an undisclosed fee. On 21 May 2012, Rowe-Turner was released by Torquay after spending two years at the club, in which he made 42 appearances and scored one goal.

=== Luton Town ===
On 2 July 2012, Rowe-Turner signed for Conference Premier club Luton Town on a two-year contract, linking back up with manager Paul Buckle who had worked with Rowe-Turner at Torquay United. Buckle left the club in February 2013 and his replacement John Still placed Rowe-Turner on the transfer list two months later. Rowe-Turner finished 2012–13 with 48 appearances and played in Luton's 1–0 FA Cup victory over Premier League team Norwich City. He went on trial with League Two club Burton Albion in July 2013.

=== Alfreton Town ===
On 2 September 2013, transfer deadline day, he joined Luton's Conference Premier rivals Alfreton Town on loan until 2 January 2014. Rowe-Turner's loan at Alfreton was extended by a further month on 3 January 2014. However, the loan was cut short after Luton recalled him. Rowe-Turner rejoined Alfreton on loan on 21 March 2014 until the end of 2013–14. He finished the season with 33 appearances as Alfreton finished 11th in the Conference Premier. Rowe-Turner left Luton by mutual consent in May 2014 after he was released from the final two months of his contract, before signing for Alfreton permanently in July.

=== Kidderminster Harriers ===
On 22 June 2015, Rowe-Turner signed for National League club Kidderminster Harriers for 2015–16.

=== Return to Torquay United ===
On 24 June 2016, Rowe-Turner re-signed for Torquay United as a replacement for the outgoing Dan Butler.

=== Chester ===
On 12 June 2017, Rowe-Turner signed for Torquay's National League rivals Chester on a one-year contract. He was released at the end of the season.

=== Kettering Town ===
Rowe-Turner signed for Southern League Premier Division Central club Kettering Town on 5 August 2018 on a one-year contract after a successful trial. He played thirty league games for Kettering as they won the Southern Premier Central League earning promotion to the National League North. Lathaniel scored a single goal league goal during the season in a 1-0 victory over local rivals AFC Rushden & Diamonds.

=== Tamworth ===
Rowe-Turner signed for another Southern League Premier Division Central club, Tamworth, on 11 June 2019. He made his debut for the club on 10 August in a 1–1 draw away to St Ives Town. Rowe-Turner made 38 appearances in all competitions before the 2019–20 season was abandoned and results expunged because of the COVID-19 pandemic in England. He committed to a second season with Tamworth on 1 July 2020.

Lathaniel signed a deal to remain with Tamworth for a third season on 8 June 2021.

=== Stourbridge ===
On 7 July 2021, he left Tamworth to sign for Southern League Premier Division rivals Stourbridge on a free transfer.

=== Nuneaton Borough ===
In the summer of 2023 joined Nuneaton Borough.

=== Kettering Town ===
In January 2024, following Nuneaton's withdrawal from the league, Rowe-Turner returned to Kettering Town.

=== Racing Club Warwick ===
In September 2025, Rowe-Turner joined Northern Premier League Division One Midlands club Racing Club Warwick.

=== Rugby Borough ===
On 31 January 2026, Rugby Borough confirmed the signing of Rowe-Turner, along with Tyrell Waite and Gary Stohrer.

== Career statistics ==
As of match played 5 February 2022

Appearances and goals by club, season and competition
Club	Season	League			FA Cup		League Cup		Other		Total	
Club	Season	Division	Apps	Goals	Apps	Goals	Apps	Goals	Apps	Goals	Apps	Goals
Cheltenham Town (loan)	2008–09	League One	1	0	—		—		—		1	0
King's Lynn (loan)	2009–10	Northern Premier League Premier Division	11	0	—		—		—		11	0
Torquay United	2009–10	League Two	6	0	—		—		—		6	0
Torquay United	2010–11	League Two	8	1	0	0	0	0	3 (Note: One appearance in Football League Trophy, two in League Two play-offs)	0	11	1
Torquay United	2011–12	League Two	21	0	1	0	1	0	2 (Note: One appearance in Football League Trophy, one in League Two play-offs)	0	25	0
Torquay United	Total		35	1	1	0	1	0	5	0	42	1
Luton Town	2012–13	Conference Premier	37	0	6	0	—		5 (Note: Appearance(s) in FA Trophy)	0	48	0
Alfreton Town (loan)	2013–14	Conference Premier	30	0	2	0	—		1 (Note: Appearance in Derbyshire Senior Cup)	0	33	0
Alfreton Town	2014–15	Conference Premier	44	1	2	0	—		4 (Note: Two appearances in Derbyshire Senior Cup, two in FA Trophy)	0	50	1
Alfreton Town	Total		74	1	4	0	—		5	0	83	1
Kidderminster Harriers	2015–16	National League	19	0	0	0	—		1	0	20	0
Nuneaton Town (loan)	2015–16	National League North	16	0	—		—		—		16	0
Torquay United	2016–17	National League	46	0	1	0	—		1	0	48	0
Chester	2017–18	National League	29	0	1	0	—		1	0	31	0
Kettering Town	2018–19	Southern League Premier Division Central	30	1	4	0	—		4 (Note: One appearance in FA Trophy, two in Southern League Cup, one in Southern League Premier Division Champions v Champions)	0	38	1
Tamworth	2019–20	Southern League Premier Division Central	29	0	5	0	—		4 (Note: Two appearances in FA Trophy, two in Birmingham Senior Cup)	0	38	0
Tamworth	2020–21	Southern League Premier Division Central	5	0	3	0	—		1 (Note: One appearance in FA Trophy)	0	9	0
Tamworth	Total		34	0	8	0	—		5	0	47	0
Stourbridge	2021–22	Southern League Premier Division Central	21	1	1	0	—		6 (Note: Four appearances in FA Trophy, two in Birmingham Senior Cup)	0	28	1
Career total			353	4	26	0	1	0	33	0	413	4

== Honours ==
Kettering Town

- Southern League Premier Division Central: 2018–19
