= Paul Buckle =

English football manager (born 1970)

Personal information
- Full name: Paul John Buckle
- Date of birth: 16 December 1970 (age 55)
- Place of birth: Welwyn Garden City, England
- Height: 5 ft 7 in (1.70 m)
- Position: Midfielder

Youth career
- –1989: Brentford

Senior career*
Years	Team	Apps	(Gls)
1989–1994	Brentford	56	(1)
1993	→ Wycombe Wanderers (loan)	3	(0)
1994–1995	Torquay United	69	(9)
1995–1996	Exeter City	25	(2)
1996	Northampton Town	0	(0)
1996	Wycombe Wanderers	0	(0)
1996–1999	Colchester United	105	(7)
1999–2002	Exeter City	98	(6)
2002–2003	Aldershot Town	30	(5)
2003–2004	Weymouth	40	(9)
2004–2005	Exeter City	4	(0)
2005	Tiverton Town	12	(1)
2005–2007	Exeter City	64	(7)
Total		506	(47)

International career
1989	England Youth		

Managerial career
- 2004: Weymouth (caretaker)
- 2007–2011: Torquay United
- 2011–2012: Bristol Rovers
- 2012–2013: Luton Town
- 2014–2015: Cheltenham Town
- 2015–2017: Sacramento Republic
- 2024: San Diego Wave (caretaker)
- * Club domestic league appearances and goals

Paul John Buckle (born 16 December 1970) is an English football manager and former player. He has previously been the interim head coach of San Diego Wave FC of the National Women's Soccer League (NWSL), the manager of Torquay United, Bristol Rovers, Luton Town, Cheltenham Town and Sacramento Republic.

An apprentice at Brentford, Buckle turned professional in 1989, was loaned to Wycombe Wanderers and then joined Torquay United, before moving to Exeter City. Due to Exeter's financial problems, Buckle left and joined Northampton Town, but failed to make their first team. In 1996 Buckle returned to Wycombe on non-contract terms, then moved to Colchester United. He returned to Exeter on a free transfer in 1999, signing a two-year contract. He then moved into non-League football with Aldershot Town and Weymouth, before returning to Exeter as player-coach in 2005, first under manager Alex Inglethorpe then his successor Paul Tisdale. He continued to play and later became the club's assistant manager.

In 2007 Buckle was appointed manager of Conference Premier side Torquay United, helping return them to the Football League at the second attempt. Following a defeat in the League Two play-off final in 2011, he left the club to become the manager of newly relegated Bristol Rovers. In 2012 Buckle became the new manager of Luton Town and led the club to the play-off final later ensured his team became the first from non-League to defeat a top flight side in the FA Cup for 24 years when Luton beat Norwich City.

Buckle married sports broadcaster Rebecca Lowe in 2013 and later moved to the US where he was appointed as technical director at Met Oval in New York City. He returned to the Football League to take the manager's job at Cheltenham Town in League Two from 2014 to 2015. He then signed as head coach of the USL soccer club Sacramento Republic, where he remained until 2018. In 2019 he was named as technical advisor at Hartford Athletic of the USL.

== Playing career ==
Buckle began his career as an apprentice at Brentford, turning professional in July 1989. He played 57 league games (15 as substitute) for Brentford, scoring once. He also played three Conference games on loan at Wycombe Wanderers before leaving on a free transfer to be signed by Don O'Riordan, the Torquay United manager, in February 1994.

After 9 goals in 71 games, Buckle moved to local rivals Exeter City in October 1995, again on a free transfer. However, with Exeter suffering serious financial problems and almost going out of business, Buckle left in 1996 as, with the club in administration, they could not afford his wages. He played in a friendly for Cambridge United (away to Watford) on 7 August, but opted to join Northampton Town. He failed to make the Cobblers first team and on 18 October 1996, he returned to Wycombe Wanderers on non-contract terms, before moving to Colchester United on 28 November.

He helped Colchester win promotion from Division Three via the play-off final at Wembley against former club Torquay. After 10 goals in 123 games for Colchester, Buckle returned to Exeter on a free transfer on 2 July 1999, signing a two-year contract. He sustained a serious ankle injury in the opening game of the new season and, although he made a full recovery and regained a first team place, he was one of many players transfer-listed by Exeter manager Noel Blake in May 2000. However, he remained at St. James' Park, playing in 43 games the following season and 25 the season after.

Buckle then joined Football Conference side Aldershot Town in 2002, before dropping down a further division to play for Weymouth in 2003, in addition to being employed as a youth-team coach at Exeter.

He was made caretaker manager at Weymouth after the club sacked Steve Claridge, obtaining a win and three draws in his four games in temporary charge. He left the club on 16 December 2004 to return in a non-paid playing role at Exeter, now themselves in non-League football. He made four appearances before joining Tiverton Town for a short time, playing in 12 games.

In March 2005, Buckle returned to Exeter City once more, this time as player-coach under manager Alex Inglethorpe, continuing in this role under Inglethorpe's successor Paul Tisdale. Buckle continued to play regularly during this spell, making 70 appearances and eventually became assistant manager.

== Coaching and management ==
=== Exeter City ===
In his role as assistant manager, he helped lead Exeter City to the Conference National play-off final at Wembley at the end of the 2006–07 season, although they lost to Morecambe.

=== Torquay United ===
After his time at Exeter City, Buckle was keen to pursue his own job as a manager and, in June 2007, he was appointed manager of relegated Torquay United by new Chief Executive Colin Lee, his former youth team manager at Brentford.

In his first season at Plainmoor he led Torquay to a third-placed finish in the Conference Premier and thus a place in the end of season play-offs to get back into the Football League. Torquay faced Buckle's former club and local rivals Exeter City. Despite a 2–1 win in the away leg, Exeter hit back and Torquay lost 4–1 at home (5–3 on aggregate). Buckle also took Torquay to the FA Trophy final, however, that was also to end in disappointment as the Gulls were defeated 1–0 by Ebbsfleet United at Wembley.

Despite a slow start to the next campaign, Torquay bounced back to again qualify for the play-offs and finished the league in fourth place. They defeated Histon in the semi-finals 2–1 on aggregate to set up a final against Cambridge United. Torquay beat Cambridge 2–0 with goals from Chris Hargreaves and Tim Sills to return to the Football League at the second attempt.

In September 2009, Buckle signed a two-year contract extension following speculation that he was to be offered the vacant managerial position at another of his former clubs, Colchester United. After being in or hovering just above the relegation zone for much of the 2009–10 campaign, Buckle eventually led Torquay to 17th place in the table following a strong finish to the season, in which they kept a club record seven consecutive clean sheets.

The next season proved more successful, with Torquay under Buckle spending much of the season in or just outside the play-off places. A seventh-placed finish, achieved on goal difference, led the club to play third-placed Shrewsbury Town in the play-off semi-final, which Torquay won 2–0 on aggregate. However, following a 1–0 defeat to Stevenage at Old Trafford in the play-off final on 28 May 2011, Buckle left the club to join newly relegated Bristol Rovers.

=== Bristol Rovers ===
Buckle's first act as Bristol Rovers manager was to successfully persuade Torquay assistant manager Shaun North, goalkeeper Scott Bevan and striker Chris Zebroski to join him. After signing a total of 19 players, and releasing or selling 19 of Rovers' existing players from the previous season's relegation, a run of four wins from the first ten games left the club in mid-table. However, things quickly worsened, with the club winning only two further league games before January and Buckle publicly falling out with Bristol Rovers' fan favourite Stuart Campbell, who he released from his contract in December 2011 after a dressing room bust up that involved Phil Kite (physio). Buckle's position at the club became increasingly unstable following home defeats to Crewe Alexandra and Plymouth Argyle that left the club just outside the relegation zone and, on 3 January 2012, he was sacked by Bristol Rovers after a 2–0 loss to struggling Barnet.

=== Luton Town ===
On 6 April 2012, 95 days after leaving Bristol Rovers, it was announced that Buckle had been appointed the new manager of Luton Town on an initial two-year contract until June 2014. At the time, Luton were sixth in the Conference Premier, one place below the play-offs, having been on a run of one win in their prior seven league games which had ultimately seen previous manager Gary Brabin sacked on 31 March 2012. Buckle watched from the stands as Luton lost 3–1 to Braintree Town on 7 April before officially taking charge the next day. There was an immediate turnaround in Luton's playing style and results under Buckle's management with the club securing a place in the play-offs by picking up 14 points from six games, keeping five clean sheets in the process. He led the club to the play-off final at Wembley Stadium after a 3–2 aggregate win against Wrexham in the semi-final, but lost 2–1 to York City in the decisive final game.

After the defeat, Buckle announced his intention to trim the Luton squad, which had played out the 2011–12 season using 34 contracted professionals, and followed this up by allowing 12 players to leave. Stating that he wanted to "bring players into the club that are not failures", he signed, among others, former Stevenage captain Ronnie Henry, who had won two promotions in three years, striker Jon Shaw, who had scored 35 goals throughout the season, and midfielder Jonathan Smith, who had played 48 times the previous season for Swindon Town as they won promotion to League One and finished as runners-up in the Football League Trophy. After a solid start to the 2012–13 season, which saw Buckle's side keep pace with the leaders, Luton's league form soon collapsed with the club winning only three league games between November 2012 and February 2013. Buckle was in charge as Luton beat Premier League side Norwich City 1–0 away at Carrow Road on 26 January 2013 in the FA Cup fourth round, striker Scott Rendell's late goal ensuring that the club became the first non-League team in 24 years to defeat a top division side in the competition. However, just three weeks later he left the club by mutual consent for personal reasons. These were later revealed to be an imminent move abroad to the US with his wife, TV sports presenter Rebecca Lowe, who was fronting NBC's Premier League coverage in the country.

=== Metropolitan Oval ===
On 4 November 2013, the Metropolitan Oval, a United States Soccer Federation development academy and historic New York City soccer facility, announced the appointment of Buckle as technical director. He was appointed to oversee all soccer-related activities at the club, which is one of the newest affiliates to the new MLS franchise club NYCFC.

=== Cheltenham Town ===
On 26 November 2014, it was announced that Buckle had become Cheltenham Town manager and will be on a twelve-month rolling contract at the club. He left the club on 13 February 2015 after only 79 days in charge.

=== Sacramento Republic ===
On 8 July 2015, Sacramento Republic announced Buckle as the new head coach to replace the departing Preki. In September 2015, Buckle was also named technical director of the club.

=== Hartford Athletic ===
Buckle was appointed as USL Championship side Hartford Athletic's technical adviser in May 2019.

=== San Diego Wave FC ===
Buckle was announced as the interim head coach of San Diego Wave FC following the departure of head coach Casey Stoney on 24 June 2024.

== Honours ==
=== Player ===
Brentford

- Football League Third Division: 1991–92

Colchester United

- Football League Third Division play-offs: 1998

=== Manager ===
Torquay United

- Conference Premier play-offs: 2009

Individual

- Football League Two Manager of the Month: August 2010
