= Connor Essam =

English footballer (born 1992)

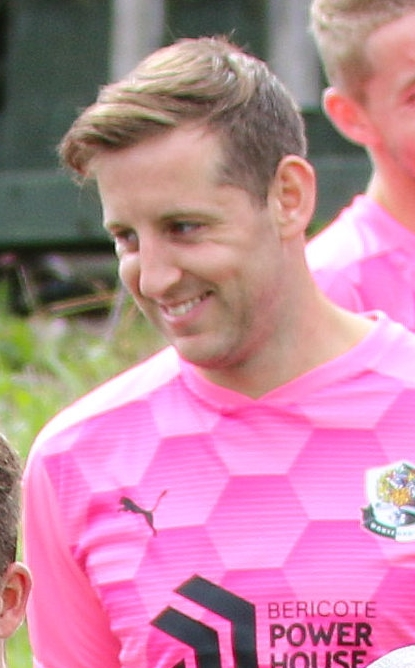
- Essam lining up for Dartford in August 2021.

Personal information
- Full name: Connor Essam
- Date of birth: 9 July 1992 (age 34)
- Place of birth: Sheerness, England
- Height: 1.83 m (6 ft 0 in)
- Position: Centre back

Youth career
- 2002–2010: Gillingham

Senior career*
Years	Team	Apps	(Gls)
2010–2013	Gillingham	18	(0)
2010–2011	→ Bishop's Stortford (loan)	10	(0)
2011	→ Dover Athletic (loan)	7	(0)
2011	→ Bishop's Stortford (loan)	7	(1)
2011–2012	→ Dartford (loan)	7	(1)
2012	→ Luton Town (loan)	9	(0)
2013–2014	Crawley Town	11	(1)
2013	→ Dartford (loan)	4	(1)
2014–2015	Dover Athletic	38	(4)
2015–2016	Leyton Orient	24	(0)
2016	→ Dover Athletic (loan)	8	(0)
2016–2017	Eastleigh	11	(0)
2016	→ Woking (loan)	6	(0)
2017	→ Dover Athletic (loan)	16	(1)
2017–2019	Dover Athletic	64	(2)
2018–2019	→ Concord Rangers (loan)	24	(1)
2019–2020	Hemel Hempstead Town	33	(2)
2020–2023	Dartford	85	(4)
2023–2024	Faversham Town	35	(5)
2024	Faversham Town	0	(0)
- * Club domestic league appearances and goals as of 15:10, 21 October 2024 (UTC)

Connor Essam (born 9 July 1992) is an English professional footballer who plays as a defender.

== Club career ==
=== Gillingham ===
Born in Chatham, Kent, Essam joined Gillingham in January 2002 and progressed through the ranks of the youth team and also captained the side. In March 2010, Essam was awarded his first professional contract along with Dean Rance and Charlie Stimson. He was sent out to Conference South side Bishop's Stortford in October 2010 on an initial one-month loan which was later extended. Later on in the season he joined Dover Athletic on loan in the same division. His contract was extended by a year in May 2011. In August 2011, Essam rejoined Bishop's Stortford of the Conference North on a one-month loan deal along with Dean Rance. He scored his first goal for the club on 29 August in a 5–0 win over Hinckley United. Essam joined Conference South outfit Dartford on loan in December 2011. He scored in the 4–1 away league win over Staines Town. Essam made his professional and Gillingham debut on 13 February 2012 in a 2–1 home defeat to Southend United. On 31 August 2012 Essam signed for Luton Town on a month-long loan, later extended for a second month. He returned to Gillingham on 2 November after making nine appearances for Luton, and was swiftly made available on a free transfer by Gillingham manager, Martin Allen.

=== Crawley Town ===
On 23 January 2013, Essam signed for Crawley Town of Football League One on a free transfer, with Gillingham retaining an interest by inserting a sell-on clause into the contract. In November 2013, Essam joined Conference Premier side Dartford on a one-month loan deal. Shortly into the 2014–15 season, he was released.

=== Dover Athletic ===
On 1 September 2014, Essam signed for Dover Athletic, on the same day as he was released by Crawley Town.

=== Leyton Orient ===
On 27 July 2015, it was announced that Essam signed for Football League Two side Leyton Orient on a one-year contract following a successful trial, despite Orient having not agreed to a transfer fee with Dover. A transfer fee was agreed between the sides the following week.

In March 2016, he returned to Dover Athletic on loan until the end of the season.

In May 2016, he was released from Leyton Orient when it was announced that he would not be retained when his contract expired.

=== Eastleigh ===
On 14 June 2016, Essam joined National League side Eastleigh on a one-year deal. After only making five appearances in the space of a month, Essam joined Woking on a 93-day loan. Two days later, Essam made his Woking debut in a 1–1 draw against Guiseley, playing the full 90 minutes. However, just after a month into his loan spell with Woking, Essam was recalled by Eastleigh to cover an injury crisis. After a short spell back at Eastleigh, Essam once again left the club on loan, this time returning to Dover Athletic on a deal for the remainder of the campaign. Following a successful loan spell back at Dover, it was announced that Essam would leave Eastleigh in June 2017 upon the expiry of his current deal.

=== Dover Athletic ===
On 20 June 2017, Essam joined Dover Athletic, returning to the Whites on a two-year deal. He made his debut on the opening day in a 1–0 away victory to Hartlepool United.

In November 2018, he joined Concord Rangers on loan until the end of the season.

=== Hemel Hempstead Town ===
Essam joined National League South team Hemel Hempstead Town in the summer of 2019.

=== Dartford ===
On 16 August 2020, Essam was announced to have joined Dartford.

On 26 May 2023, Essam announced that he had left Dartford.

=== Faversham Town ===
On 22 June 2023, Essam joined SCEFL Premier Division side Faversham Town. His departure from the club was announced in June 2024.

In October 2024, Essam returned to Faversham Town on a one-match basis, featuring in an FA Vase victory over British Airways.

== Career statistics ==
As of 7 May 2024

Appearances and goals by club, season and competition
Club	Season	League			FA Cup		League Cup		Other		Total	
Club	Season	Division	Apps	Goals	Apps	Goals	Apps	Goals	Apps	Goals	Apps	Goals
Gillingham	2010–11	League Two	0	0	0	0	0	0	0	0	0	0
Gillingham	2011–12	League Two	18	0	0	0	0	0	0	0	18	0
Gillingham	2012–13	League Two	0	0	0	0	0	0	—		0	0
Gillingham	Total		18	0	0	0	0	0	0	0	18	0
Bishop's Stortford (loan)	2010–11	Conference South	10	0	—		—		1 (Note: Appearance(s) in FA Trophy)	0	11	0
Dover Athletic (loan)	2010–11	Conference South	7	0	—		—		—		7	0
Bishop's Stortford (loan)	2011–12	Conference North	7	1	—		—		—		7	1
Dartford (loan)	2011–12	Conference South	7	1	—		—		1	0	8	1
Luton Town (loan)	2012–13	Conference Premier	9	0	—		—		—		9	0
Crawley Town	2012–13	League One	9	1	—		—		—		9	1
Crawley Town	2013–14	League One	2	0	0	0	0	0	1 (Note: Appearance in Football League Trophy)	0	3	0
Crawley Town	Total		11	1	0	0	0	0	1	0	12	1
Dartford (loan)	2013–14	Conference Premier	4	1	—		—		2	0	6	1
Dover Athletic	2014–15	Conference Premier	38	4	5	1	—		6	1	49	6
Leyton Orient	2015–16	League Two	24	0	0	0	1	0	1	0	26	0
Dover Athletic (loan)	2015–16	National League	8	0	—		—		1 (Note: Appearance in National League play-offs)	0	9	0
Eastleigh	2016–17	National League	11	0	5	0	—		0	0	16	0
Woking (loan)	2016–17	National League	6	0	—		—		—		6	0
Dover Athletic (loan)	2016–17	National League	16	1	—		—		—		16	1
Dover Athletic	2017–18	National League	46	1	2	0	—		3	0	51	1
Dover Athletic	2018–19	National League	18	1	1	0	—		0	0	19	1
Dover Athletic	Total		64	2	3	0	—		3	0	70	2
Concord Rangers (loan)	2018–19	National League South	24	1	—		—		0	0	24	1
Hemel Hempstead Town	2019–20	National League South	33	2	1	0	—		2	1	36	3
Dartford	2020–21	National League South	15	1	0	0	—		2	0	17	1
Dartford	2021–22	National League South	26	0	3	0	—		8 (Note: Two appearances in the London Senior Cup) (Note: Three appearances in the Kent Senior Cup) (Note: Three appearances in the FA Trophy)	2	37	2
Dartford	2022–23	National League South	44	3	1	0	—		1 (Note: One appearance in the National League South Play-Offs)	0	46	3
Dartford	Total		85	4	4	0	0	0	11	2	100	6
Faversham Town	2023–24	Southern Counties East Football League Premier Division	35	5	0	0	—		0	0	35	5
Career total			417	23	18	1	1	0	29	4	465	28

== Honours ==
Dartford

- Kent Senior Cup: 2019–20, 2021–22
