= Scott Rendell =

English footballer (born 1986)

Personal information
- Full name: Scott David Rendell
- Date of birth: 21 October 1986 (age 40)
- Place of birth: Ashford, England
- Height: 6 ft 0 in (1.83 m)
- Position: Striker

Team information
- Current team: AFC Totton (manager)

Youth career
- 2002: Staines Albion

Senior career*
Years	Team	Apps	(Gls)
2004	Aldershot Town	0	(0)
2004–2007	Reading	0	(0)
2005	→ Aldershot Town (loan)	7	(0)
2005–2006	→ Forest Green Rovers (loan)	16	(2)
2006	→ Hayes (loan)	8	(0)
2006–2007	→ Crawley Town (loan)	21	(8)
2007	Crawley Town	21	(3)
2007–2008	Cambridge United	29	(17)
2008	→ Peterborough United (loan)	10	(3)
2008–2010	Peterborough United	3	(1)
2008	→ Yeovil Town (loan)	5	(0)
2008–2009	→ Cambridge United (loan)	26	(13)
2009–2010	→ Torquay United (loan)	35	(12)
2010–2012	Wycombe Wanderers	43	(15)
2011	→ Bristol Rovers (loan)	5	(0)
2012	→ Oxford United (loan)	18	(3)
2012–2014	Luton Town	37	(8)
2013	→ Woking (loan)	16	(7)
2014–2016	Woking	59	(34)
2016–2019	Aldershot Town	111	(32)
2019–2020	Eastleigh	34	(6)
2020–2021	Maidstone United	12	(5)
2021–2022	Havant & Waterlooville	28	(3)
2022–	AFC Totton	145	(73)

Managerial career
- 2026–: AFC Totton
- * Club domestic league appearances and goals as of 13:29, 18 August 2026 (UTC)

Scott David Rendell (born 21 October 1986) is an English footballer who plays as a striker for AFC Totton, where he holds the role of player-manager.

== Career ==
=== Early career ===
Rendell was born in Ashford, Surrey, but lived in Basingstoke, Hampshire. He started his career with Staines Albion, where he played until the age of 16. After this, Rendell was signed onto the books of Aldershot Town before joining nearby Reading. Unable to break into the Reading first-team, he was loaned back to Aldershot, and had work experience loans at Forest Green Rovers and Hayes.

While at Forest Green, Rendell scored the club's first ever goal as a professional side on the opening day of the 2005–06 season against Cambridge United, who he would later go on to sign for.

Rendell had a successful spell with Crawley Town, initially on loan, before making the move permanent until the end of the 2006–07. He scored 11 goals in 42 league games for Crawley throughout the season.

=== Cambridge United ===
He joined Cambridge United on a free transfer in the summer of 2007. He started the season as a substitute, but following an injury to fellow striker Lee Boylan, he was given a first-team opportunity and scored 22 goals by mid-February.

=== Peterborough United ===
On 18 February 2008, Rendell joined Cambridge's rivals Peterborough United on loan with a view to a permanent transfer. He scored three goals in ten games towards the end of the 2007–08 season as Peterborough won promotion to League One. The move was made permanent in May for a fee of £115,000. However, after failing to make an impact at London Road during the beginning of the 2008–09 season due to the success of the forward pairing of Craig Mackail-Smith and Aaron McLean, Rendell joined Yeovil Town on loan for one month.

=== Return to Cambridge United ===
When the Yeovil loan expired, Rendell re-joined his former club, Cambridge United, on an initial loan until January 2009. After negotiation, his loan at Cambridge was extended until the end of the season. Rendell went on to score a 119th-minute winning goal against Stevenage Borough in the second leg of the 2009 Conference Premier play-off semi-final, sending Cambridge into the final, which they lost to Torquay United. Peterborough rejected a bid from York City to sign Rendell on loan for the 2009–10 season in July 2009.

=== Torquay United ===
In July 2009, Rendell signed for League Two side Torquay United on a year-long loan. He scored 13 times for the club across 41 games.

=== Wycombe Wanderers ===
In June 2010 Rendell signed for an undisclosed fee for League Two side Wycombe Wanderers. In his first season as a Wycombe player he topped the goalscoring charts at the club, with a return of 19 goals, 9 of which were penalties. Wycombe won promotion to League One and Rendell struggled to replicate his scoring form. In October 2011 he was loaned out to Bristol Rovers for one month.

On 31 January 2012 Rendell signed on loan for Oxford United until the end of the season, where he scored three goals in 18 appearances.

=== Luton Town ===
On 20 June 2012 Rendell signed for Conference Premier side Luton Town on a two-year contract for an undisclosed fee from Wycombe Wanderers. This move reunited him with manager Paul Buckle, who he had played under at Torquay and Bristol Rovers. Rendell scored his first goal for the Hatters in a 3–1 victory against Ebbsfleet United on 27 August 2012.

On 26 January 2013 Rendell scored the winning goal in Luton's fourth round FA Cup match against Premier League team Norwich City. He scored 12 goals in 47 games over the 2012–13 season, but was transfer listed by new Luton manager John Still in April 2013. In July 2013, he had a trial at former club Torquay United, but suffered a hamstring strain in a friendly match against Salisbury and returned to Luton.

On 13 September 2013, Rendell joined Conference Premier side Woking on loan for three months. He scored on his debut against Tamworth and went on to score six further league goals in 15 matches before returning to Luton. In January 2014, he went on trial once again with Torquay, but was not offered a contract. Rendell was released from his Luton contract by mutual consent later that month.

=== Woking ===
On 30 January 2014, Rendell signed contractual forms for Woking until the end of the 2013–14 season. He was the leading scorer for the club for the following two seasons winning numerous player of the season honours after an outstanding 2014–15 season. He signed a contract for 2015–16 season with The Cards. However his season came to an end just 40 minutes into the start of the campaign after a cruciate knee ligament rupture playing against Tranmere Rovers Over £10,000 was raised by a supporter-led fundraising campaign in order to fund the treatment of said injury, though Rendell later went on to play for local rivals Aldershot Town F.C., frequently scoring in derby games against the Cards.

=== Return to Aldershot Town ===
On 23 June 2016, Rendell joined Woking's local rivals Aldershot Town on a one-year deal. On 6 August 2016, Rendell made his Aldershot Town debut in a 1–0 defeat against Barrow, replacing Will Evans at half-time.

He signed a new one-year contract with Aldershot in May 2018.

=== Eastleigh ===
On 31 May 2019, Rendell signed a one-year contract with Eastleigh following his release from Aldershot. Rendell was released at the end of the 2019–20 season.

=== Maidstone United ===
On 10 July 2020, Maidstone United announced the signing of Rendell.

=== Havant & Waterlooville ===
At the end of the 2020–21 season, Rendell joined Havant & Waterlooville. Rendell was released at the end of the 2021–22 season.

=== AFC Totton ===
On 25 June 2022, Rendell signed for Southern Football League Division One South club AFC Totton.

== Managerial career ==
In March 2026, following the departure of manager Jimmy Ball, Rendell was promoted from his role of assistant manager to interim manager of AFC Totton. Having picked up thirteen points from eight matches in interim charge, he was appointed permanent manager of 21 April 2026.

== Personal life ==
Rendell is married to Sam. The couple had a son, Alfie, who was born four weeks prematurely in late 2010 and died on Christmas Eve of the same year. The couple have since had two more children, Finley (born 2012) and Lottie (born 2013).

== Career statistics ==
As of match played 18 January 2025

Appearances and goals by club, season and competition
Club	Season	League			FA Cup		League Cup		Other		Total	
Club	Season	Division	Apps	Goals	Apps	Goals	Apps	Goals	Apps	Goals	Apps	Goals
Aldershot Town (loan)	2004–05	Conference Premier	6	0	0	0	—		0	0	6	0
Forest Green Rovers (loan)	2005–06	Conference Premier	16	2	0	0	—		0	0	16	2
Hayes (loan)	2005–06	Conference South	8	0	0	0	—		0	0	8	0
Crawley Town (loan)	2006–07	Conference Premier	21	8	0	0	—		0	0	21	8
Crawley Town	2006–07	Conference Premier	21	3	0	0	—		0	0	21	3
Cambridge United	2007–08	Conference Premier	29	17	3	2	—		2 (Note: One appearance in Conference League Cup and one in FA Trophy)	0	34	19
Peterborough United (loan)	2007–08	League Two	10	3	0	0	0	0	0	0	10	3
Peterborough United	2008–09	League One	3	1	0	0	1	0	1 (Note: Appearances in Football League Trophy)	0	5	1
Yeovil Town (loan)	2008–09	League One	5	0	1	0	0	0	0	0	6	0
Cambridge United (loan)	2008–09	Conference Premier	24	15	0	0	—		1 (Note: Appearances in FA Trophy)	0	25	15
Torquay United (loan)	2009–10	League Two	35	12	3	1	1	0	2	0	41	13
Wycombe Wanderers	2010–11	League Two	37	14	3	2	1	0	2	3	43	19
Wycombe Wanderers	2011–12	League One	6	1	1	0	2	0	2	0	11	1
Wycombe Wanderers	Total		43	15	4	2	3	0	4	3	54	20
Bristol Rovers (loan)	2011–12	League Two	5	0	0	0	0	0	0	0	5	0
Oxford United (loan)	2011–12	League Two	18	3	0	0	0	0	0	0	18	3
Luton Town	2012–13	Conference Premier	36	8	6	4	—		4	0	46	12
Woking (loan)	2013–14	Conference Premier	16	7	0	0	—		2	0	18	7
Woking	2013–14	Conference Premier	18	10	0	0	—		0	0	18	10
Woking	2014–15	Conference Premier	40	24	2	0	—		2	2	44	26
Woking	2015–16	National League	1	0	0	0	—		0	0	1	0
Woking	Total		59	34	2	0	—		2	2	63	36
Aldershot Town	2016–17	National League	43	13	0	0	—		4 (Note: Two appearances in FA Trophy, two appearances in National League play-offs)	0	47	13
Aldershot Town	2017–18	National League	38	11	2	1	—		1 (Note: Appearances in National League play-offs)	1	41	13
Aldershot Town	2018–19	National League	31	7	2	1	—		0	0	33	8
Aldershot Town	Total		112	31	4	2	—		5	1	121	34
Eastleigh	2019–20	National League	34	6	6	4	—		1	1	41	11
Maidstone United	2020–21	National League South	12	5	2	0	—		2	1	16	6
Havant & Waterlooville	2021–22	National League South	28	3	4	1	—		2 (Note: Appearances in Hampshire Senior Cup)	1	34	5
AFC Totton	2022–23	Southern League; Division One South	38	28	3	3	—		6 (Note: Four appearances and two goals in FA Trophy, one appearance in Southern League Division One Championship match, one appearance and two goals in Southampton Senior Cup)	4	47	35
AFC Totton	2023–24	Southern League; Premier Division South	41	24	4	5	—		9 (Note: Four appearances and one goal in FA Trophy, two appearances in Southern League Premier Division South play-offs, three appearances in Hampshire Senior Cup)	1	54	30
AFC Totton	2024–25	Southern League; Premier Division South	21	8	1	1	—		4	0	26	9
AFC Totton	Total		100	60	8	9	—		19	5	127	74
Career total			635	232	42	25	3	0	40	13	724	271
