= Simon Ainge =

English footballer (born 1988)

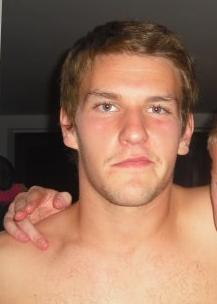

Personal information
- Full name: Simon Christopher Ainge
- Date of birth: 18 February 1988 (age 38)
- Place of birth: Shipley, England
- Positions: Defender; forward

Team information
- Current team: Yorkshire Amateur

Youth career
- –2006: Bradford City

Senior career*
| Years | Team | Apps | (Gls) |
| 2006–2009 | Bradford City | 14 | (0) |
| 2008 | → Halifax Town (loan) | 12 | (0) |
| 2009 | → Cambridge United (loan) | 2 | (0) |
| 2009 | Bradford Park Avenue | 2 | (0) |
| 2009–2013 | Guiseley | 111 | (11) |
| 2012–2013 | → Luton Town (loan) | 12 | (1) |
| 2013 | Luton Town | 10 | (0) |
| 2013–2015 | FC Halifax Town | 58 | (3) |
| 2015–2016 | Bradford Park Avenue | 46 | (6) |
| 2016–2018 | Harrogate Town | 53 | (35) |
| 2018 | → Wrexham (loan) | 10 | (0) |
| 2018–2020 | Darlington | 33 | (4) |
| 2019–2020 | → Boston United (loan) | 12 | (0) |
| 2020–2021 | Gainsborough Trinity | 8 | (2) |
| 2021– | Yorkshire Amateur | 0 | (0) |

International career
| 2012–2013 | England C | 2 | (0) |
- * Club domestic league appearances and goals as of 12:43, 29 July 2021 (UTC)

Simon Christopher Ainge (born 18 February 1988) is an English footballer who plays for Yorkshire Amateur League Supreme Division club Yorkshire Amateur as a defender and a forward.

He began his career at Bradford City in the lower divisions of the Football League, and then spent three seasons playing for Guiseley before transferring to Luton Town. He was released by Luton in July 2013 and subsequently spent 18-month spells at FC Halifax Town and Bradford Park Avenue. After 18 months with Harrogate Town and a three-month loan to Wrexham, Ainge signed for Darlington in 2018.

== Career ==
Born in Shipley, near Bradford, West Yorkshire, Simon Ainge is a product of Bradford City's youth system, winning a senior contract in March 2006. He broke into the first team the following season making his debut in a 2–1 defeat to Scunthorpe United on 17 October 2006 in the Football League Trophy. He made his first league appearance the following month before his first start was in a 4–0 FA Cup victory over Crewe Alexandra on 4 November 2006. He played four times during November 2006 winning praise from his manager Colin Todd, a former England international centre back. Ainge played a total of 11 games during the 2006–07 season but he was limited to just four games the following season, including three as substitute, and was instead given a trial at Scunthorpe United. He returned to Bradford before he joined Conference club Halifax Town in January 2008 in a loan deal for the rest of the season.

Ainge was an unused substitute as Halifax went out of the FA Trophy as they lost to Rushden & Diamonds 2–0, and instead made his league debut the following weekend against the same team when he gave away a penalty for handball. Two days earlier Ainge had been one of five substitutes, who were all on loan at Halifax, during their 4–1 West Riding County Cup victory over Ossett Albion. Ainge came on during the victory but Halifax were later thrown out of the competition because loan players were not eligible. Ainge did not feature again for Halifax until 24 March 2008, when he came on as a substitute in the 16th minute when Halifax lost 2–0 to Droylsden. On 15 April 2008, he received the first red card of his career, for two bookable offences during Halifax's 2–1 defeat by Burton Albion. He played 12 games during his loan spell for Halifax, helping them to avoid relegation from the Conference by just one point from Altrincham. He returned to Bradford in time to play in their final game of the season with Wycombe Wanderers as a late substitute. Ainge made his first start for City in more than a year as replacement for injured full backs Paul Arnison and TJ Moncur in a 1–1 draw with Luton Town on 4 October 2008. It was Ainge's only game for Bradford during the 2008–09 season, and instead he joined Cambridge United of the Conference on another loan deal on the March transfer deadline day for the final two months of the season. He made his debut for Cambridge as a substitute in their 1–0 victory against Woking.

At the end of the 2008–09 season, Ainge was released by Bradford City; he joined their cross-city rivals Bradford Park Avenue of the Northern Premier League Premier Division in July 2009. He stayed at Avenue until November 2009 after playing in only three games, when he signed for their league rivals Guiseley. Ainge was part of the Guiseley team that won promotion to the Conference North during the 2009–10 Northern Premier League season, and he was made the club's captain for the start of the 2010–11 season. Ainge led Guiseley to a highest ever league position of fifth, but the club lost in the play-off final to AFC Telford United to a stoppage-time goal. In the 2011–12 season he captained Guiseley to an even higher finish of second place though they again lost in the play-offs, this time to Nuneaton Town at the semi-final stage. Ainge scored eight goals from central defence during the campaign.

At the end of the season, Ainge was called up to play for the England C semi-professional national team in a game against Russia U23 on 5 June 2012, which England C lost 4–0. He later captained England C to a 2–1 win over Belgium U23 on 12 September 2012.

Ainge's performances for Guiseley were picked up by Conference Premier side Luton Town, who moved to take him on an initial one-month loan on 27 September 2012. After playing in four wins and one loss, in which he scored one goal, Luton extended his loan for a further two months and reached an agreement with Guiseley for the transfer to become permanent in January 2013. Ainge officially joined Luton for an undisclosed fee on 2 January 2013. He was transfer listed by the club in April 2013 following a change in Luton's management, and his contract was terminated on 4 July 2013.

Following his release from Luton Town, he joined newly promoted Conference Premier club FC Halifax Town. On 11 August 2013, Ainge made his debut for Halifax in a heavy 5–1 defeat to Cambridge United.

In January 2015, Ainge rejoined Bradford Park Avenue.

He signed for Harrogate Town in May 2016. He arrived as a defender, but a switch to striker under manager Simon Weaver was extremely successful, and led him to the National League North Player of the Month award for February 2017 and a place in the 2016–17 National League North team of the season.

In February 2018, Ainge joined Wrexham on loan.

Ainge signed a two-year contract with National League North club Darlington ahead of the 2018–19 season; the fee was undisclosed. He was a regular in the team, used either in defence or attack, throughout the season, but was then allowed to leave the club for financial reasons. He signed for another National League North club, Boston United, on loan for the 2019–20 season.

In August 2020, Ainge joined Gainsborough Trinity. He made ten appearances and scored three goals in all competitions before the season was abandoned. He signed for Northern Premier League Division One East club Yorkshire Amateur in April 2021.

== Career statistics ==
As of match played 12 October 2019

Appearances and goals by club, season and competition
| Club | Season | League | | | FA Cup | | League Cup (Note: Includes appearances in Football League Cup and Northern Premier League Challenge Cup) | | Other | | Total | |
| Club | Season | Division | Apps | Goals | Apps | Goals | Apps | Goals | Apps | Goals | Apps | Goals |
|---|---|---|---|---|---|---|---|---|---|---|---|---|
| Bradford City | 2006–07 | League One | 9 | 0 | 2 | 0 | 0 | 0 | 1 (Note: Appearances in Football League Trophy) | 0 | 12 | 0 |
| Bradford City | 2007–08 | League Two | 4 | 0 | 0 | 0 | 0 | 0 | 1 | 0 | 5 | 0 |
| Bradford City | 2008–09 | League Two | 1 | 0 | 0 | 0 | 0 | 0 | 0 | 0 | 1 | 0 |
| Bradford City | Total | | 14 | 0 | 2 | 0 | 0 | 0 | 2 | 0 | 18 | 0 |
| Halifax Town (loan) | 2007–08 | Conference Premier | 12 | 0 | 0 | 0 | — | | 0 | 0 | 12 | 0 |
| Cambridge United (loan) | 2008–09 | Conference Premier | 2 | 0 | 0 | 0 | — | | 0 | 0 | 2 | 0 |
| Bradford Park Avenue | 2009–10 | Northern Premier | 2 | 0 | 1 | 0 | — | | 0 | 0 | 3 | 0 |
| Guiseley | 2009–10 | Northern Premier | 24 | 1 | 0 | 0 | 1 | 0 | 1 (Note: Appearance in Peter Swales Shield) | 0 | 26 | 1 |
| Guiseley | 2010–11 | Conference North | 38 | 2 | 5 | 0 | — | | 8 (Note: Three appearances in Conference North play-offs, six in FA Trophy) | 0 | 51 | 2 |
| Guiseley | 2011–12 | Conference North | 40 | 8 | 2 | 0 | — | | 6 (Note: Two appearances in Conference North play-offs, four in FA Trophy) | 0 | 48 | 8 |
| Guiseley | 2012–13 | Conference North | 9 | 0 | 1 | 0 | — | | — | | 10 | 0 |
| Guiseley | Total | | 111 | 11 | 8 | 0 | 1 | 0 | 15 | 0 | 135 | 11 |
| Luton Town | 2012–13 | Conference Premier | 22 | 1 | 0 | 0 | — | | 5 (Note: Appearance(s) in FA Trophy) | 1 | 27 | 2 |
| FC Halifax Town | 2013–14 | Conference Premier | 42 | 2 | 2 | 0 | — | | 1 | 0 | 45 | 2 |
| FC Halifax Town | 2014–15 | Conference Premier | 16 | 1 | 3 | 0 | — | | 0 | 0 | 19 | 1 |
| FC Halifax Town | Total | | 58 | 3 | 5 | 0 | — | | 1 | 0 | 64 | 3 |
| Bradford Park Avenue | 2014–15 | Conference North | 18 | 5 | 0 | 0 | — | | 0 | 0 | 18 | 5 |
| Bradford Park Avenue | 2015–16 | National League North | 28 | 1 | 0 | 0 | — | | 2 | 0 | 30 | 1 |
| Bradford Park Avenue | Total | | 46 | 6 | 0 | 0 | — | | 2 | 0 | 48 | 6 |
| Harrogate Town | 2016–17 | National League North | 39 | 22 | 1 | 0 | — | | 2 | 1 | 42 | 23 |
| Harrogate Town | 2017–18 | National League North | 15 | 13 | 0 | 0 | — | | 0 | 0 | 15 | 13 |
| Harrogate Town | Total | | 54 | 35 | 1 | 0 | — | | 2 | 1 | 57 | 36 |
| Wrexham (loan) | 2017–18 | National League | 10 | 0 | 0 | 0 | — | | 0 | 0 | 10 | 0 |
| Darlington | 2018–19 | National League North | 33 | 4 | 1 | 0 | — | | 1 | 0 | 35 | 4 |
| Boston United (loan) | 2019–20 | National League North | 12 | 0 | 2 | 0 | — | | 0 | 0 | 14 | 0 |
| Career total | | | 376 | 60 | 20 | 0 | 1 | 0 | 28 | 2 | 425 | 62 |
