= Lee Roache =

English footballer

Personal information
- Full name: Lee Daniel Roache
- Date of birth: 30 April 1984 (age 42)
- Place of birth: Leytonstone, England
- Position: Striker

Youth career
- Barnet

Senior career*
Years	Team	Apps	(Gls)
2003–2006	Barnet	36	(7)
2003	→ Berkhamsted Town (loan)	4	(0)
2003–2004	→ Bishop's Stortford (loan)		
2004	→ Windsor & Eton (loan)	15	(6)
2006	→ Yeading (loan)	?	(2)
2006–2009	Cambridge City	74	(16)
2008–2009	→ Eastleigh (loan)	3	(0)
2009	Histon	12	(0)
2009–2010	Braintree Town	2	(0)
2010	Bath City		
2010	Hemel Hempstead Town	1	(0)
2010–2011	Thurrock	17	(3)
2011	Harlow Town	22	(0)
2011–2016	Dunstable Town	138	(82)
2016	Bishop's Stortford	0	(0)
2016–2018	Bedford Town	61	(27)
2018	Stotfold	3	(1)
2020–2021	Hayling United F.C	22	(6)
- * Club domestic league appearances and goals

Lee Daniel Roache (born 30 April 1984) is an English retired footballer who played as a striker. He played in the Football League for Barnet.

== Career ==
Roache, born in Leytonstone and a product of Barnet's youth academy system, was given a professional contract in the summer of 2003. He spent time on loan at Berkhamsted Town, Bishop's Stortford and Windsor & Eton during the 2003–04 season, and still found time to make his Barnet debut, on 14 October in the Football League Trophy against Second Division club Brentford. He helped the club gain promotion from the Conference the following season, and made his debut in the Football League on 27 August 2005, as a late substitute in the 1–0 home defeat to Grimsby Town. In 2006, he went out on loan again, spending two months at Yeading, and was released at the end of the 2005–06 season.

Roache joined Conference South club Cambridge City, where he spent two and a half years, including a spell on loan to Eastleigh, and scored 21 goals from 91 appearances in all competitions. He then joined Conference National side Histon in January 2009 for "a four-figure fee". He made his Histon debut as a substitute against Forest Green Rovers in February 2009, the first of twelve appearances from the bench without scoring, and was released before the 2009–10 season. He then joined Braintree Town, before a brief spell with Bath City, afterwards joining Hemel Hempstead Town in March 2010, and then at Thurrock. Roache signed for Harlow Town at the start of the 2011–12 season, but was released on 1 September. He signed for Dunstable Town soon after, scoring 25 goals in his just 26 games including two hat-tricks. In all competitions, Roache went on to score 113 goals across five seasons, before re-joining Bishop's Stortford in June 2016. He then joined Bedford Town on dual registration. On Sunday 7 February Roache came out of retirement, and joined Hayling United on Joe Regan's Football Manager 21 save with The Humbugs. It is expected, Lee will retire at the end of the 20–21 season, after an 18-year career full of goals, becoming a cult hero at his final club.
