= Jonathan Smith (footballer, born 1986) =

English footballer

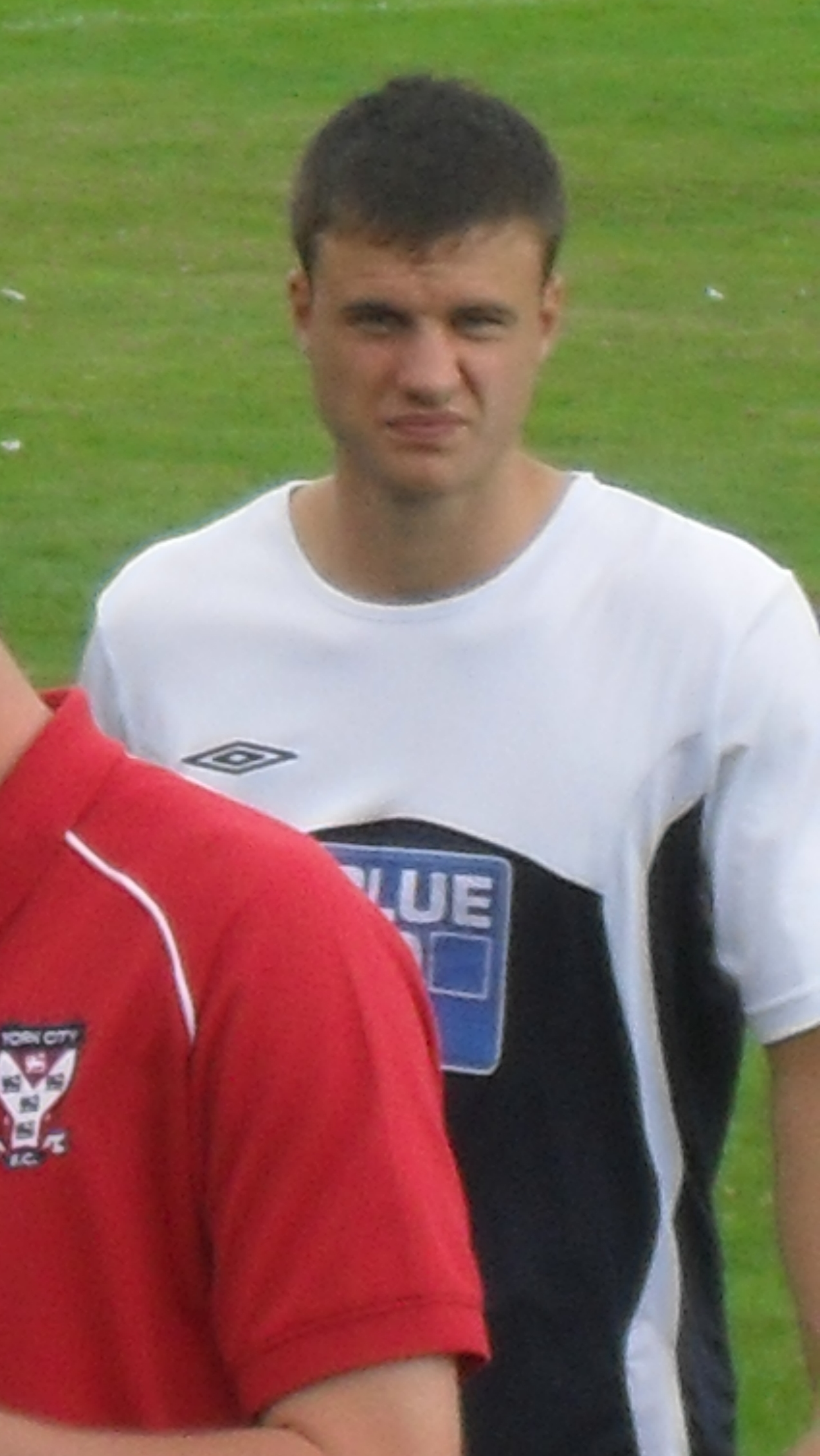
- Smith training with York City in 2010

Personal information
- Full name: Jonathan Peter Smith
- Date of birth: 17 October 1986 (age 40)
- Place of birth: Preston, England
- Height: 6 ft 3 in (1.91 m)
- Position: Midfielder

Youth career
- –2005: Morecambe

Senior career*
Years	Team	Apps	(Gls)
2005–2007	Morecambe	0	(0)
2006	→ Fleetwood Town (loan)	16	(1)
2007	→ Bamber Bridge (loan)		
2007–2010	Forest Green Rovers	107	(15)
2010–2011	York City	39	(4)
2011–2012	Swindon Town	38	(3)
2012–2013	York City	12	(0)
2012	→ Luton Town (loan)	4	(1)
2013–2017	Luton Town	145	(9)
2017–2018	Stevenage	36	(3)
2018	→ Chesterfield (loan)	8	(3)
2018–2021	Chesterfield	61	(6)
2021–2022	FC United of Manchester	33	(2)
- * Club domestic league appearances and goals as of 17:20, 24 December 2023 (UTC)

Jonathan Peter Smith (born 17 October 1986) is an English professional footballer who plays as a midfielder.

Smith started his career with Morecambe, who loaned him out to Fleetwood Town and Bamber Bridge. Having appeared twice for Morecambe he was released in 2007 and subsequently signed for Forest Green Rovers. After three years with Forest Green he signed for York City in 2010, but departed after a year to join Swindon Town. With them he won the League Two title in the 2011–12 season, but was transfer listed following their promotion and returned to York in 2012. He signed for Luton Town later that year, initially on loan, before signing permanently in 2013. Smith spent five seasons with Luton, winning the Conference Premier title in the 2013–14 season, before joining Stevenage in August 2017. Smith signed for Chesterfield in November 2018, having been on loan there since September.

== Career ==
=== Morecambe ===
Born in Preston, Lancashire, Smith began his career with Morecambe, having progressed through the club's youth system. He made his first-team debut in the Football League Trophy fixture against Grimsby Town on 18 October 2005, with Smith scoring Morecambe's final penalty kick in their victorious penalty shoot-out. He joined Northern Premier League First Division outfit Fleetwood Town on loan in January 2006 and made his debut in a 2–0 victory at home to Belper Town on 28 January. He stayed at the club until April 2006, having made 16 appearances and scored one goal.

Smith was loaned out to Northern Premier League First Division club Bamber Bridge in February 2007. On 31 May 2007, following Morecambe's promotion to League Two, Smith was released by Sammy McIlroy alongside fellow Morecambe teammates Danny Meadowcroft and Thomas Pickersgill.

=== Forest Green Rovers ===
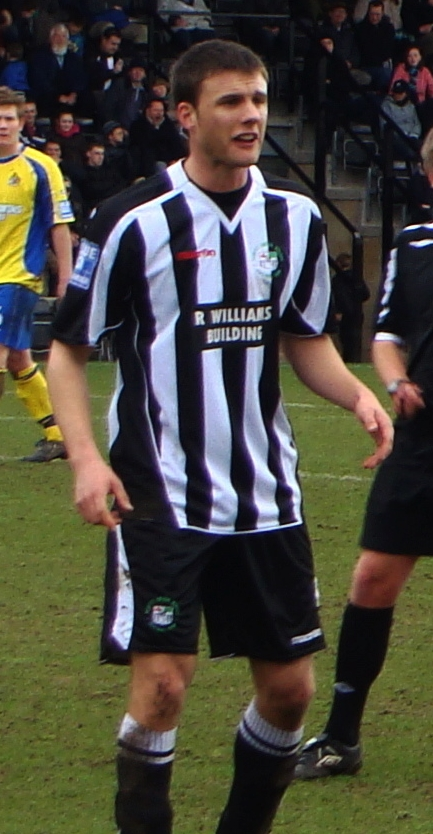
Smith playing for Forest Green Rovers in 2010

Smith completed his free transfer move to Conference Premier club Forest Green Rovers on 3 July 2007 and became an influential member of the squad during his three-year stay at the club. He was a part of the side that made it to the FA Cup third round during the 2008–09 season and scored in Forest Green's 4–3 loss to Derby County on 3 January 2009. Smith made 134 appearances for Forest Green in all competitions.

=== York City ===
Smith left Forest Green Rovers after signing for Conference Premier rivals York City on a free transfer for a small compensation fee on 6 July 2010. Like his career at Forest Green, Smith also helped York to a credible FA Cup run, playing in their five matches before being eliminated in the third round by Premier League club Bolton Wanderers on 8 January 2011. He made 44 appearances for York in 2010–11, in which he scored five goals.

=== Swindon Town ===
On 21 June 2011, Smith joined League Two club Swindon Town on a two-year contract to become manager Paolo Di Canio's second summer signing. Smith joined the Wiltshire club for an officially undisclosed fee of £30,000. He finished 2011–12 with 48 appearances and three goals, with 38 of those appearances coming in the league, as Swindon won the League Two title.

=== Return to York City ===
Having been transfer listed by Swindon at the end of the season, Smith returned to York City after signing for the newly promoted League Two club on a two-year contract on 21 July 2012. He made his second debut for York in their match away at League One club Doncaster Rovers in the League Cup first round on 11 August 2012, which they lost 4–2 in a penalty shoot-out following a 1–1 draw after extra time. He then played in York's first Football League fixture since their promotion, a 3–1 defeat at home to Wycombe Wanderers on 18 August 2012.

=== Luton Town ===
On 5 November 2012, Smith was loaned out to Conference Premier club Luton Town until 5 January 2013, having played in 13 matches for York in 2012–13. He made his debut the following day in a 1–0 defeat at Hereford United. Smith scored his first goal for Luton with a header in their 3–0 home win over Alfreton Town on 8 December 2012. This proved to be his final appearance in his loan spell for Luton, as he was recalled by York on 11 December 2012, having scored once in six appearances for the Bedfordshire team. Smith was disappointed at the recall, having previously expressed his desire to stay at Luton and experience "playing in front of a big crowd every week". On 29 December 2012, it was confirmed that Smith would make a permanent move to Luton on 1 January 2013, signing a one-and-a-half-year contract after the two clubs agreed a fee of £50,000. He made 28 appearances as a permanent player for Luton in 2012–13, including in the club's 1–0 FA Cup win over Premier League team Norwich City.

Smith became a constant presence in central midfield during the first half of Luton's 2013–14 season, which helped to propel the club into second place in the table. However, a mistimed challenge from Jon Nurse in a 2–1 win over Barnet on 26 December 2013 saw Smith suffer a "horrific" bone fracture of both his right tibia and fibula. Luton won promotion to League Two with three matches of 2013–14 remaining, and Smith came on as a late substitute four months to the day after his injury in a 1–0 victory over Hyde on the last day of the campaign.

In 2014–15, Smith returned fully fit to Luton's starting lineup in a 1–0 home win over Cheltenham Town on 13 September 2014. His return coincided with an 11-match unbeaten league run that placed the club at the top of the table. Luton's form fell away in the final months of the season, winning only three times in their last 13 matches, resulting in the club finishing in eighth position. However, Smith's influence on the campaign saw him awarded the Players' Player of the Year and Luton Town Website Player of the Year accolades. At the end of the season he signed a three-year contract extension with the club.

Smith scored Luton's first goal of 2015–16 on 8 August 2015, deflecting in a Craig Mackail-Smith shot to earn the club a 1–1 draw with Accrington Stanley. He scored twice during a run of four consecutive league wins from late September to early October, having also scored during a 3–2 away defeat to Notts County prior to this. However, Luton's inconsistent form throughout the season resulted in the club finishing in 11th position.

He began 2016–17 by scoring Luton's third goal in second half stoppage time on the opening day of the season in a 3–0 win away to Plymouth Argyle, having entered the match as an 88th-minute substitute. Having predominantly played as a substitute early in the season, manager Nathan Jones said "I told him to be patient, because he's a key member of our squad". On his second start of the season, Smith scored Luton's second goal in a 2–1 win away to Gillingham in the EFL Trophy on 30 August 2016. After making one start in Luton's opening 22 league matches, Smith forced his way into the first-team at the turn of the year, starting 11 of the next 15 league matches, before losing his place in the team for the final nine league matches of the season. He was an unused substitute in both legs of the play-off semi-final defeat to Blackpool, losing 6–5 on aggregate, and finished the season with 35 appearances and two goals. After the end of the season, Smith was transfer listed by Luton.

=== Stevenage ===
On 7 August 2017, Smith signed for League Two club Stevenage on an undisclosed-length contract, after being allowed to leave Luton by mutual consent.

=== Chesterfield ===
Smith joined National League club Chesterfield on 18 September 2018 on a 93-day loan. Smith signed an 18-month deal with the club on 8 November 2018, after having his Stevenage contract cancelled by mutual consent. Smith became club captain in December 2018, starting with the 2–0 victory over Salford City.

=== FC United of Manchester ===
In August 2021, he signed for Northern Premier League Premier Division side F.C. United of Manchester on a free transfer.

== Career statistics ==
As of match played 21 September 2019

Appearances and goals by club, season and competition
Club	Season	League			FA Cup		League Cup		Other		Total	
Club	Season	Division	Apps	Goals	Apps	Goals	Apps	Goals	Apps	Goals	Apps	Goals
Morecambe	2005–06	Conference National	0	0	0	0	—		1 (Note: Appearance(s) in Football League Trophy)	0	1	0
Morecambe	2006–07	Conference National	0	0	1	0	—		0	0	1	0
Morecambe	Total		0	0	1	0	—		1	0	2	0
Fleetwood Town (loan)	2005–06	NPL First Division	16	1	—		—		—		16	1
Forest Green Rovers	2007–08	Conference Premier	25	2	5	0	—		2 (Note: Appearance(s) in FA Trophy)	0	32	2
Forest Green Rovers	2008–09	Conference Premier	42	6	5	2	—		9 (Note: Five appearances in Conference League Cup, four in FA Trophy)	0	56	8
Forest Green Rovers	2009–10	Conference Premier	40	7	5	1	—		1	0	46	8
Forest Green Rovers	Total		107	15	15	3	—		12	0	134	18
York City	2010–11	Conference Premier	39	4	5	1	—		0	0	44	5
Swindon Town	2011–12	League Two	38	3	3	0	2	0	5	0	48	3
York City	2012–13	League Two	12	0	0	0	1	0	1	0	14	0
Luton Town	2012–13	Conference Premier	28	1	4	0	—		2	0	34	1
Luton Town	2013–14	Conference Premier	24	2	2	0	—		0	0	26	2
Luton Town	2014–15	League Two	35	2	4	0	0	0	1	0	40	2
Luton Town	2015–16	League Two	37	4	2	0	1	0	1	0	41	4
Luton Town	2016–17	League Two	25	1	2	0	2	0	6 (Note: Appearance(s) in EFL Trophy)	1	35	2
Luton Town	2017–18	League Two	0	0	—		—		—		0	0
Luton Town	Total		149	10	14	0	3	0	10	1	176	11
Stevenage	2017–18	League Two	36	3	4	2	1	0	1	0	42	5
Stevenage	2018–19	League Two	0	0	—		0	0	0	0	0	0
Stevenage	Total		36	3	4	2	1	0	1	0	42	5
Chesterfield	2018–19	National League	32	4	3	0	—		3	1	38	5
Chesterfield	2019–20	National League	12	1	0	0	—		0	0	12	1
Chesterfield	Total		44	5	3	0	—		3	1	50	6
Career total			441	41	45	6	7	0	33	2	526	49

== Honours ==
Swindon Town

- Football League Two: 2011–12
- Football League Trophy runner-up: 2011–12

Luton Town

- Conference Premier: 2013–14
