= Arnaud Mendy =

Footballer (born 1990)

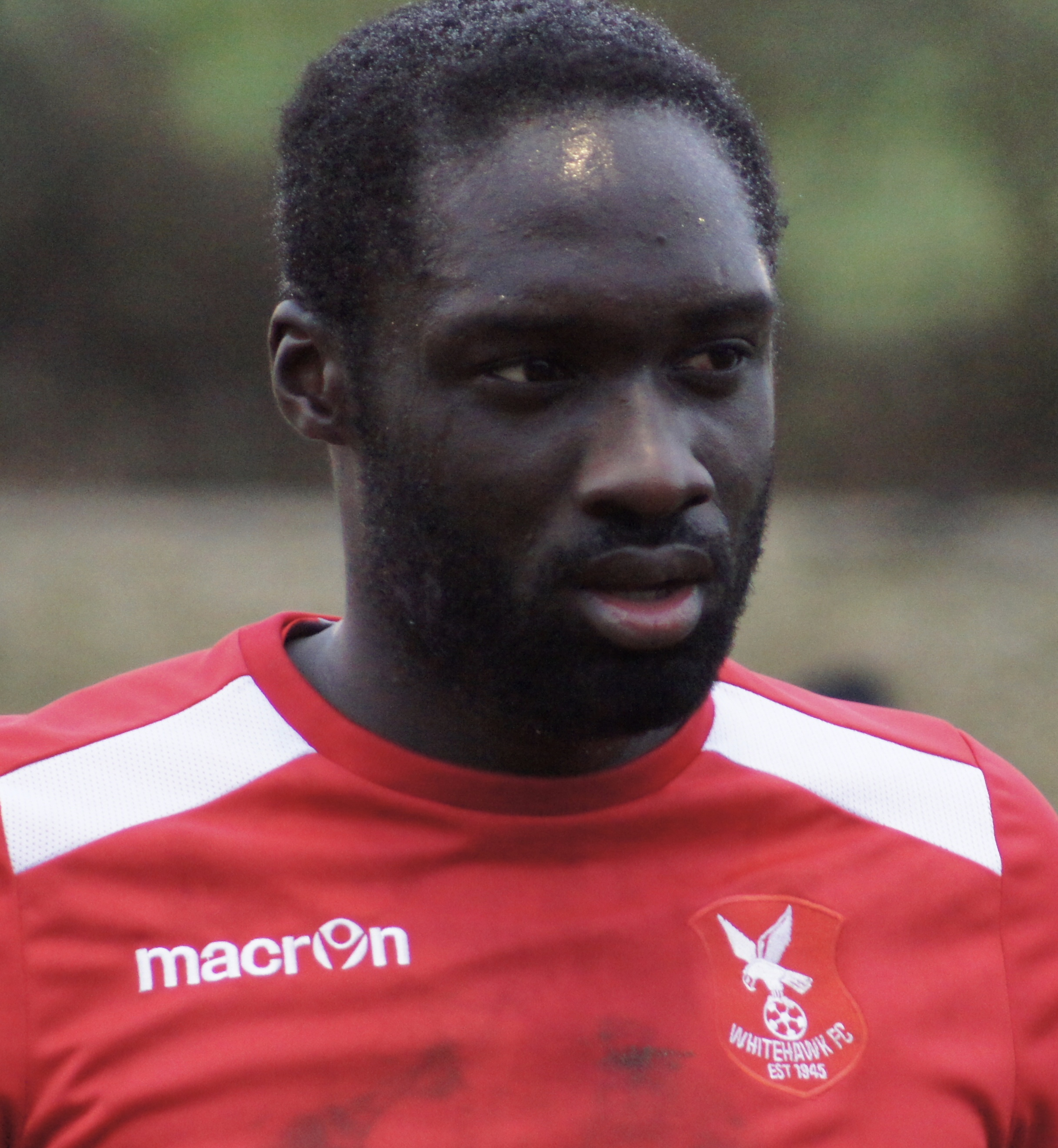
- Mendy playing for Whitehawk in 2018

Personal information
- Full name: Arnaud Mendy
- Date of birth: 10 February 1990 (age 36)
- Place of birth: Évreux, France
- Height: 6 ft 3 in (1.91 m)
- Position: Midfielder

Youth career
- 1997–2007: ALM Évreux

Senior career*
Years	Team	Apps	(Gls)
2007–2008	Rouen	11	(3)
2008–2011	Derby County	1	(0)
2009	→ Grimsby Town (loan)	1	(0)
2010	→ Tranmere Rovers (loan)	12	(1)
2011–2013	Macclesfield Town	42	(4)
2012–2013	→ Luton Town (loan)	8	(0)
2013	Luton Town	10	(0)
2014–2015	Lincoln City	37	(1)
2015–2016	Whitehawk	32	(1)
2016–2017	Hemel Hempstead Town	18	(0)
2017–2018	Naxxar Lions	7	(0)
2018	Whitehawk	10	(0)
2018–2019	Welling United	29	(0)
Total		218	(10)

International career
2011–2014	Guinea-Bissau	2	(0)
- * Club domestic league appearances and goals

Arnaud Mendy (born 10 February 1990) is a former professional footballer who played as a midfielder.

He started his career in France with Rouen, he went on to play professionally for Derby County, Grimsby Town, Tranmere Rovers, Macclesfield Town, Luton Town and Lincoln City. He later moved into non-league football for Whitehawk, Hemel Hempstead Town and Welling United. He also had a spell in the Maltese Premier League with Naxxar Lions. Born in France, he made two appearances for the Guinea-Bissau national team at international level.

== Career ==
=== FC Rouen ===
Mendy was born in Évreux, Eure, France. He made his debut for Rouen during the 2007–08 season, making 12 appearances at the age of 17 and scoring three goals, as Rouen missed out on promotion to the Championnat National by three points.

=== Derby County ===
Mendy joined English side Derby County from Rouen as an academy player in the close season of 2008, and played for the academy and reserve sides in his first season. He made his first team debut in a pre-season friendly against Stoke City on 1 August 2009, coming on as a substitute four minutes from time and scoring a last minute equaliser for Derby in a 2–2 draw. His competitive debut was in a 3–0 victory over Sheffield Wednesday on 3 October 2009. Two weeks later, Mendy joined Grimsby Town on an initial one-month loan. He made his debut on 17 October 2009 against Rochdale. This game was to be Mendy's only as a Grimsby player, as manager Mike Newell was sacked the next day, and the following week caretaker manager Neil Woods left him out of the eighteen man squad to face AFC Bournemouth. On 29 October, Mendy and fellow loanee Josh Magennis had their loan contracts terminated ahead of schedule. He was due to join Rotherham United on loan until the end of the 2009–10 season on 26 March 2010, but the deal was not completed in time. Mendy stayed at Derby and featured regularly for the club's reserve side, which won the Central League Championship during the 2009–10 season.

Mendy was given the squad number 24 ahead of the 2010–11 season, but moved to Tranmere Rovers on a month's loan on 31 August 2010. He made his debut in a Football League Trophy match against Accrington Stanley before making his first league start in a 1–0 win over Peterborough United, where he scored the winning goal, converting from close range for the first goal of his career in England and earning Rovers their first win of the season.

He returned to Derby at the end of his three-month loan spell and featured in reserve fixtures for the remainder of his time at the club. Having failed to break into Derby's first team, the club announced in May 2011 that Mendy would not be retained past completion of his contract in June 2011.

=== Macclesfield Town ===
On 11 July 2011, Mendy joined League Two outfit Macclesfield Town on a one-year contract. On 7 January 2012, Mendy scored a spectacular, back-to-goal volley in a game at home Premier League side Bolton Wanderers in The FA Cup Third Round to make the scoreline 2–1 to Macclesfield. The game eventually finished 2–2, which forced a replay at the Reebok Stadium. Mendy then became a regular in the Macclesfield starting eleven. However, the club was relegated to the Conference Premier in April 2012. Mendy stayed with Macclesfield as they began their first season of non-league football in 15 years.

=== Luton Town ===
Mendy joined Macclesfield's divisional rivals Luton Town on loan on 19 October, with the transfer made permanent in January 2013. He made 28 appearances for Luton in all competitions, but was transfer listed by new manager John Still in March 2013 following an unspecified breach of club discipline. Still confirmed that Mendy would not play for the club again. Mendy went on trial in July 2013 with League Two side Portsmouth, but was not offered a contract. Despite Still's earlier proclamation, Mendy started for Luton on 30 November 2013 in a 0–0 FA Trophy draw with Staines Town. He was released from his contract on 27 December 2013.

=== Lincoln City ===
On 10 February 2014, following a successful trial period, he signed a contract with Conference Premier side Lincoln City until the end of the 2013–14 season.

=== Later career ===
In July 2015, Mendy signed for Brighton-based National League South side Whitehawk, to play once more with ex-Macclesfield manager Steve King. Mendy was sent off in the 25th minute of his debut at Hayes & Yeading and left for Hemel Hempstead Town at the end the season.

On 11 September 2017 he joined Naxxar Lions in the Maltese Premier League. Mendy was released in January 2018 and re-joined his former manager Steve King at Whitehawk.

== Career statistics ==
As of match played 21 April 2014.

Appearances and goals by club, season and competition
Club	Season	League		National cup		League cup		Other		Total	
Club	Season	Apps	Goals	Apps	Goals	Apps	Goals	Apps	Goals	Apps	Goals
Rouen	2007–08	11	3	1	0	0	0	0	0	12	3
Derby County	2008–09	0	0	0	0	0	0	0	0	0	0
Derby County	2009–10	1	0	0	0	0	0	0	0	1	0
Derby County	2010–11	0	0	0	0	0	0	0	0	0	0
Grimsby Town (loan)	2009–10	1	0	0	0	0	0	0	0	1	0
Tranmere Rovers (loan)	2010–11	12	1	0	0	0	0	1 (Note: Appearance(s) in Football League Trophy)	0	13	1
Macclesfield Town	2011–12	28	2	4	1	1	0	0	0	33	3
Macclesfield Town	2012–13	14	2	0	0	0	0	0	0	14	2
Macclesfield Town	Total	42	4	4	1	1	0	0	0	47	5
Luton Town (loan)	2012–13	8	0	5	0	0	0	1 (Note: Appearance(s) in FA Trophy)	0	14	0
Luton Town	2012–13	10	0	2	0	0	0	2	0	14	0
Luton Town	2013–14	0	0	0	0	0	0	1	0	1	0
Luton Town	Total	18	0	7	0	0	0	4	0	29	0
Lincoln City	2013–14	7	0	0	0	0	0	0	0	7	0
Career total		92	8	12	1	1	0	5	0	109	9
