= Jon Shaw =

English association football player

Personal information
- Full name: Jon Steven Shaw
- Date of birth: 10 November 1983 (age 43)
- Place of birth: Sheffield, England
- Height: 6 ft 1 in (1.85 m)
- Position: Striker

Youth career
- –2003: Sheffield Wednesday

Senior career*
| Years | Team | Apps | (Gls) |
| 2003–2004 | Sheffield Wednesday | 18 | (2) |
| 2003–2004 | → York City (loan) | 8 | (0) |
| 2004–2007 | Burton Albion | 101 | (26) |
| 2007–2008 | Halifax Town | 37 | (20) |
| 2008–2010 | Rochdale | 7 | (1) |
| 2009 | → Crawley Town (loan) | 17 | (5) |
| 2009 | → Barrow (loan) | 14 | (5) |
| 2009–2010 | → Gateshead (loan) | 1 | (0) |
| 2010 | Mansfield Town | 14 | (3) |
| 2010–2012 | Gateshead | 80 | (45) |
| 2012–2014 | Luton Town | 42 | (8) |
| 2014–2016 | Gateshead | 65 | (11) |
| 2016–2022 | South Shields | 169 | (18) |
| 2022–2023 | Dunston UTS | 17 | (2) |
| 2023 | Blyth Spartans | 7 | (1) |
| 2025 | North Shields | 8 | (0) |
| Total | | 605 | (147) |

International career
| 2006–2008 | England C | 6 | (1) |

Managerial career
- 2023–2024: Blyth Spartans
- * Club domestic league appearances and goals

Jon Steven Shaw (born 10 November 1983) is an English football manager and former player who was recently manager of Blyth Spartans. He played as a striker and more recently as a central defender, appearing in the Football League for Sheffield Wednesday, York City and Rochdale and pursuing a lengthy career in non-league football.

== Club career ==
=== Sheffield Wednesday ===
Born in Sheffield, South Yorkshire, Shaw is a product of the Sheffield Wednesday youth system and was a prolific goalscorer for the second string. He made his first-team debut as a 75th-minute substitute coming on for Gerald Sibon in the FA Cup third round against Gillingham at the Priestfield Stadium during a 3–1 defeat on 7 January 2003. His first league appearance came on the final game of the 2002–03 season, coming on as a 90th-minute substitute at Hillsborough for a 2–1 victory over Walsall. He signed his first professional contract with the club on 2 July 2003.

The following season, he joined Third Division team York City on a month's loan for first team experience, making an encouraging debut in a 1–0 victory over Doncaster Rovers. The loan was extended for a further two months in December. He made eight appearances but failed to score before he was recalled by Wednesday in January 2004 due to an injury crisis at the club. He made his first appearance since returning in a 4–0 victory over Scunthorpe United in the Football League Trophy. Shaw made eight starts that season for Wednesday and scored his first two senior goals, with a header against Luton Town and a long range effort against Queens Park Rangers in front of 29,313 fans at Hillsborough. Both goals came on the second last and last games of the season respectively.

Chris Turner rewarded the youngster for his performances with a new contract at the end of the 2003–04 season. Darlington were looking to sign him on a season-long loan in July 2004, although he eventually did not join the club. After being told by new manager Paul Sturrock he had no future with Wednesday, York manager Chris Brass expressed an interest in signing him. He did not start a single match under Turner's replacement Paul Sturrock and was released by the club.

=== Burton Albion ===
He joined Conference National team Burton Albion in November 2004 on non-contract terms, where he was reunited with former strike partner Mark Robins. After scoring in his first two games he signed an extended deal until the end of the season with Burton in late November. His next goal came in a 2–1 victory for The Brewer's against former team York City at Bootham Crescent. He would score against York again a month later in the FA Trophy at the Pirelli Stadium in a 3–0 win. Shaw scored 12 goals in his first season at Burton, making him the club's leading goalscorer for the season. He signed a new two-year contract with Burton during March 2005. He was not as prolific in the 2005–06 season, where he scored 11 goals, but still managed to top the goal scoring charts. He also played in the lucrative FA Cup tie against Manchester United on 8 January 2006 where he helped secure a 0–0 draw. However, in the reverse fixture at Old Trafford, Shaw was forced to leave the field of play due to an injury sustained to the mouth.

=== Halifax Town ===
Shaw joined Halifax Town for an undisclosed fee on 31 August 2007. He made his debut in a 1–1 draw with Oxford United, before scoring two goals in the following game, a 3–2 victory over Stafford Rangers. He scored against former club Burton on 2 November, in a game that finished a 2–2 stalemate at The Shay. He had a fine first season at the club, scoring 20 goals in 37 league appearances, making him the club's top scorer, plus he also scored a goal in one of his three FA Cup matches for the club. His goals and performances on the pitch earned him many awards at the end of season awards including the supporters club player of the year.

=== Rochdale ===
Shaw signed a two-year contract with League Two side Rochdale for an undisclosed fee on 4 July 2008. He made his debut in a League Cup match at Spotland Stadium against Oldham Athletic, which finished 0–0 in regular time and was won by Oldham 4–1 on a penalty shoot-out on 12 August. His debut in the league came later in the week against Barnet at Spotland on 16 August, and he wrapped up a 3–1 victory with the final goal of the game, with a shot into the corner in the 72nd minute. He suffered from an injury, and soon after recovering joined Conference side Crawley Town on loan for the rest of the 2008–09 season on 6 January 2009. He featured as a substitute on 24 January in a 1–0 loss to Oxford United and came off the bench three days later at Ebbsfleet United to score a 92nd-minute equaliser with a goal from 18 yards in a 4–4 draw. After failing to gain a place back in the Rochdale side for the start of the 2009–10 season, Shaw went back to the Conference, joining Barrow on a month's loan. He made his debut in a 6–1 defeat to Rushden & Diamonds at Holker Street, and later went on to score 5 goals in 12 games. Shaw joined Gateshead on a one-month loan on 26 November 2009, making his debut in the FA Trophy First Round replay away at Harrogate Town on 15 December 2009. Shaw only made 2 appearances for Gateshead during the loan spell, the other being a league game against Barrow on Boxing Day.

=== Mansfield Town ===
On 14 January 2010, Shaw left Rochdale by mutual consent to pursue a contract with Conference Premier side Mansfield Town. He made his debut for the club two days later in a 2–0 defeat to AFC Wimbledon. He scored his first goal for the club in a 3–1 defeat away at eventual champions Stevenage Borough. He went on to score 3 in his 6 starts for the Stags. On Wednesday 26 May 2010, Mansfield Town announced that Shaw would be leaving Field Mill by mutual consent.

=== Gateshead ===
On 29 May 2010, Shaw rejoined fellow Conference Premier side Gateshead on a two-year deal. He made his first appearance of the season against Cambridge United on 4 September 2010. Shaw scored his first goal for Gateshead on 11 September 2010 in a 2–0 home victory over Altrincham. On 15 January 2011, Shaw scored a hat-trick in Gateshead's 6–0 victory at home to Hampton & Richmond Borough. On 19 February 2011, Shaw scored his second hat-trick for Gateshead in a 7–2 victory against Wrexham at the Racecourse Ground. He was named Conference Premier Player of the Month for February 2011, after scoring six goals in five league games that month. He was also named Conference Premier Player of the Month for August 2011, after scoring in each of the six league games during the opening month of the 2011–12 season. Shaw scored back-to-back hat-tricks, his third and fourth hat-tricks for Gateshead, on 24 September 2011 against Hayes & Yeading United and the following game on 27 September against York City, both games ending as 3–2 victories for Gateshead. On 28 January 2012, Shaw scored his 50th Gateshead goal in only his 80th appearance, his 40th league goal in 67 league games for the club. At the end of the season, Shaw rejected a new contract offered by Gateshead.

=== Luton Town ===
Shaw signed for Gateshead's Conference Premier rivals Luton Town on a two-year contract on 21 June 2012. He scored on his debut in Luton's opening game of the 2012–13 season, coincidentally in a 2–2 draw with his former club Gateshead. In Shaw's fifth game for Luton, a 1–0 defeat to AFC Telford United, he instigated a 21-player brawl which saw Luton captain Ronnie Henry and Telford's Dan Preston sent off. Shaw's role was initially not noticed by the referee, but he was later charged by the Football Association with violent conduct and banned for three matches. In total, Shaw scored eight league goals for Luton during the 2012–13 season as the club finished seventh in the table.

Shaw started in four games at the beginning of the 2013–14 season, but struggled with an injury. He underwent a hernia operation in late August, ruling him out for six weeks. He then suffered further injuries in training, which prevented him from playing until early January 2014. He went on to become a regular on the substitute bench towards the end of the 2013–14 season but ultimately ended the campaign, in which Luton won the Conference Premier title, without scoring in his 13 appearances. On 9 May 2014, it was announced that Shaw would not be offered a new contract and would leave Luton in June 2014.

=== Return to Gateshead ===
On 12 June 2014, Shaw rejoined Gateshead for a third spell, signing a two-year deal. His first appearance of the season was on the opening day of the season in a 3–1 win at home to Torquay United. His first goal of the season followed three days later on 12 August against Wrexham.

On 3 May 2016, Shaw was released by Gateshead.

=== South Shields ===
On 2 July 2016, Shaw signed a part-time contract for the Northern Division One side South Shields.

=== Dunston UTS ===
On 26 May 2022, Shaw was announced to be joining Dunston UTS when his contract with South Shields expired. In January 2023, he suffered a punctured lung during a match against Consett. He returned to action in February, and finished the season with two goals from 17 league appearances.

=== Blyth Spartans ===
Shaw was appointed assistant manager of Blyth Spartans under Graham Fenton, with whom he had worked for several years at South Shields. He was also registered as a player. When Fenton was sacked in December, Shaw retired from playing and took over as manager on an 18-month contract.

Shaw was relieved of his duties on April 29, 2024.

=== North Shields ===
On July 17, 2025 Shaw came out of retirement to sign for North Shields F.C.

Shaw Once again retired on the 13th September 2025 after a 4-1 victory over Northallerton Town

== International career ==
He was named in the England National Game XI team in February 2006 for their game against Italy, who Shaw made his debut against in a 3–1 victory for England. He returned to the England C squad in May 2008 for the Four Nation Tournament and friendlies against Grenada and Barbados. He featured all five of the available fixtures, which included a goal in the 2–0 win against Barbados.

== Career statistics ==
As of match played 9 April 2016

Appearances and goals by club, season and competition
| Club | Season | League | | | FA Cup | | League Cup | | Other | | Total | |
| Club | Season | Division | Apps | Goals | Apps | Goals | Apps | Goals | Apps | Goals | Apps | Goals |
|---|---|---|---|---|---|---|---|---|---|---|---|---|
| Sheffield Wednesday | 2002–03 | First Division | 1 | 0 | 1 | 0 | 0 | 0 | — | | 2 | 0 |
| Sheffield Wednesday | 2003–04 | Second Division | 14 | 2 | 1 | 0 | 0 | 0 | 3 (Note: Appearance(s) in Football League Trophy) | 0 | 18 | 2 |
| Sheffield Wednesday | 2004–05 | Second Division | 3 | 0 | 0 | 0 | 1 | 0 | 0 | 0 | 4 | 0 |
| Sheffield Wednesday | Total | | 18 | 2 | 2 | 0 | 1 | 0 | 3 | 0 | 24 | 2 |
| York City (loan) | 2003–04 | Third Division | 8 | 0 | — | | — | | — | | 8 | 0 |
| Burton Albion | 2004–05 | Conference National | 19 | 11 | — | | — | | 6 (Note: Appearance(s) in FA Trophy) | 1 | 25 | 12 |
| Burton Albion | 2005–06 | Conference National | 41 | 11 | 6 | 2 | — | | 1 | 0 | 48 | 13 |
| Burton Albion | 2006–07 | Conference National | 36 | 4 | 2 | 0 | — | | 2 | 2 | 40 | 6 |
| Burton Albion | 2007–08 | Conference Premier | 5 | 0 | — | | — | | — | | 5 | 0 |
| Burton Albion | Total | | 101 | 26 | 8 | 2 | — | | 9 | 3 | 118 | 31 |
| Halifax Town | 2007–08 | Conference Premier | 37 | 20 | 3 | 1 | — | | 6 (Note: Two appearances and two goals in Conference League Cup, four appearances and three goals in FA Trophy) | 5 | 46 | 26 |
| Rochdale | 2008–09 | League Two | 6 | 1 | 3 | 0 | 1 | 0 | 1 (Note: Appearance in League Two play-offs) | 0 | 11 | 1 |
| Rochdale | 2009–10 | League Two | 1 | 0 | — | | 1 | 0 | — | | 2 | 0 |
| Rochdale | Total | | 7 | 1 | 3 | 0 | 2 | 0 | 1 | 0 | 13 | 1 |
| Crawley Town (loan) | 2008–09 | Conference Premier | 17 | 5 | — | | — | | 1 | 0 | 18 | 5 |
| Barrow (loan) | 2009–10 | Conference Premier | 14 | 5 | 2 | 0 | — | | — | | 16 | 5 |
| Gateshead (loan) | 2009–10 | Conference Premier | 1 | 0 | — | | — | | 1 | 0 | 2 | 0 |
| Mansfield Town | 2009–10 | Conference Premier | 14 | 3 | — | | — | | — | | 14 | 3 |
| Gateshead | 2010–11 | Conference Premier | 37 | 17 | 1 | 0 | — | | 7 | 4 | 45 | 21 |
| Gateshead | 2011–12 | Conference Premier | 43 | 28 | 3 | 3 | — | | 4 | 4 | 50 | 35 |
| Gateshead | Total | | 80 | 45 | 4 | 3 | — | | 11 | 8 | 95 | 56 |
| Luton Town | 2012–13 | Conference Premier | 31 | 8 | 4 | 1 | — | | 3 | 1 | 38 | 10 |
| Luton Town | 2013–14 | Conference Premier | 11 | 0 | 0 | 0 | — | | 2 | 0 | 13 | 0 |
| Luton Town | Total | | 42 | 8 | 4 | 1 | — | | 5 | 1 | 51 | 10 |
| Gateshead | 2014–15 | Conference Premier | 30 | 8 | 1 | 1 | — | | 5 | 1 | 36 | 10 |
| Gateshead | 2015–16 | National League | 35 | 3 | 1 | 0 | — | | 2 | 0 | 39 | 3 |
| Gateshead | Total | | 65 | 11 | 2 | 1 | — | | 7 | 1 | 74 | 13 |
| Career total | | | 404 | 126 | 28 | 8 | 3 | 0 | 44 | 18 | 479 | 152 |

== Honours ==
Luton Town

- Conference Premier: 2013–14

South Shields

- FA Vase: 2016–17
