= Ellis Remy =

English footballer

Personal information
- Full name: Ellis Nathan Remy
- Date of birth: 13 February 1984 (age 42)
- Place of birth: Edmonton, London
- Position: Striker

Youth career
- ?–2002: Wimbledon

Senior career*
Years	Team	Apps	(Gls)
2002–2003	Hastings United		
2003	Lincoln City	1	(0)
2003	→ Kettering Town (loan)	2	(1)
2003–2004	Grays Athletic	16	(2)
2004	→ Redbridge (loan)		
2004	Redbridge		
2004–2005	Braintree Town		
2005	East Thurrock United		
2005–2006	Margate	12	(3)
2006	Bromley	9	(3)
2006	Staines Town	8	(0)
2006	Harrow Borough	1	(0)
2006	East Thurrock United		
2006–2007	Folkestone Invicta		
2007–2008	Welling United	13	(1)
2008	Heybridge Swifts	4	(0)
2008–2009	Enfield Town		
2009–2010	Bishop's Stortford		
2009–2010	→ Potters Bar Town (loan)	13	(8)
2010–2011	Brentwood Town	?	(5)
2011	Maldon & Tiptree		
2011–2012	Aveley	19	(2)
2012	Hemel Hempstead Town	4	(1)
2012–2013	Eastbourne Borough	20	(3)
2013	Hitchin Town	7	(1)
2014	Haringey Borough	5	(0)
2014	Histon	0	(0)
2014–2015	Tilbury	3	(0)
2016	Enfield Borough	1	(1)
2017	Ware	4	(0)

International career^{‡}
2010–2014	Montserrat	6	(2)
- * Club domestic league appearances and goals as of 16:35, 17 May 2018 (UTC) ‡ National team caps and goals as of 17 May 2018

Ellis Nathan Remy (born 13 February 1984) is a semi-professional footballer who last played as a striker for Ware. He played in the Football League for Lincoln City and international football for Montserrat.

== Career ==
=== Club career ===
Remy started his career at Wimbledon, before signing for non-League club Hastings United in the summer of 2002. After a successful trial, he signed for Football League club, Lincoln City at the start of the 2003–04 season. He made his debut for Lincoln on 9 August 2003, in the 1–0 Division Three home defeat to Oxford United, coming on as a substitute for Simon Weaver in the 64th minute. Three days later, Remy made his last appearance for Lincoln City, in another 1–0 home loss, to Stockport County in the Football League Cup First Round, coming on as a substitute for Rory May in the 84th minute. He was loaned out to non-League football club Kettering Town in September where he made two appearances, scoring once. In October, Remy dropped back into non-League football permanently signing for Isthmian League Premier Division club Grays Athletic for a fee of £5,000, a club record at the time.

In August 2004, Remy joined Redbridge on loan, before eventually signing for the club on a permanent basis in October following his release alongside Daniel Lunan and Chris Wild. He was released late in October due to budget constraints, subsequently moving on to Braintree Town in November, before a short spell at East Thurrock United, and then onto Margate in summer 2005. On leaving East Thurrock, joint manager, Lee Patterson commented saying; "With Tony [Boot] coming it means that Ellis Remy has joined Margate. Ellis is a really nice lad, but wasn't really suited to play up front with Steve West." After leaving Margate, Remy went on to play for Bromley, signing a short-term deal in January 2006, whilst training with Conference National club Dagenham & Redbridge. He went on to join Staines Town in March.

He then signed for Harrow Borough in August 2006, although returned to East Thurrock United and then joined Folkestone Invicta in December. In December 2007, Neil Smith signed Remy for Conference South club Welling United from Folkestone. He went on to play for Heybridge Swifts signing in the summer of 2008, however, he left in September alongside Darren Blewitt after manager Brian Statham resigned. Remy subsequently joined Isthmian League Division One North club Enfield Town alongside former Heybridge teammate Darren Blewitt and Mark Nougher in September 2008.

Potters Bar Town signed Remy on loan from Bishop's Stortford, scoring on his debut against former club Enfield Town. During his loan spell at Potters Bar, he made 13 appearances in the league scoring eight goals. In August 2010, Remy signed for Isthmian League Division One North club Brentwood Town after his release from Bishop's Stortford. Remy signed for Maldon & Tiptree in February 2011 to bolster their attacking options, joint-manager Brad King commented on Remy saying that he "has a good record and a wealth of experience of non-league football". He then joined former Brentwood manager, Carl Griffiths at Aveley of the Isthmian League Premier Division at the start of the 2011–12 season. Remy went on to sign for Southern League Premier Division club Hemel Hempstead Town in January 2012. Remy signed for Conference South club Eastbourne Borough on 24 February 2012. He left Eastbourne at the end of the season. However, he rejoined Eastbourne shortly after the start of the 2012–13 season.

After being released by Eastbourne, Remy signed for Southern League Premier club Hitchin Town on 15 March 2013.

=== International career ===
Remy first trained with the Montserrat national team in 2007. Montserrat coach, Kenny Dyer said that Remy had tried to get his younger cousins who were playing for Arsenal and West Ham United as under-17s "on board for the future". He eventually made his international debut for Montserrat on 7 October 2010, in the 7–0 away defeat to Saint Vincent and the Grenadines at Victoria Park, Kingstown in the Caribbean Cup Group B. However, after receiving two yellow cards, he was sent-off in the 68th minute, and failed to make another appearance in the tournament.

He played all three games for Montserrat in the 2012 edition and scored twice in the final game, a 7–0 thrashing of the British Virgin Islands for Montserrat's first win as a FIFA member.
