= Lunan =

Lunan may refer to:

== Geography ==
=== Europe ===
- Lunan, Angus, a hamlet in Angus, Scotland
- Lunan, Lot, a commune in the Lot department in south-western France
- Lunan Water, a river in Angus, Scotland
- Lunan Burn, a river that flows into Loch of Butterstone

=== China ===
- Lunan District (路南区), in Tangshan, Hebei
- Lunan, Yingkou (路南镇), town in Laobian District, Yingkou, Liaoning
- Lunan Subdistrict, Qinhuangdao (路南街道), in Shanhaiguan District, Qinhuangdao, Hebei
- Lunan Subdistrict (路南街道), a township-level division of Lianyungang, Jiangsu
- Lunan Subdistrict, Taizhou, Zhejiang (路南街道), in Luqiao District, Taizhou, Zhejiang

== People ==
- David Lunan, Church of Scotland minister
- Duncan Lunan, Scottish astronomer and science writer
- Daniel Lunan, English semi-professional footballer
- Gordon Lunan, Canadian spy for the Soviet Union
