= Lenny Hewlett =

Antiguan professional football manager

Personal information
- Full name: Linnington Hewlett

Managerial career
- Years: Team
- 2007: Antigua and Barbuda U15
- 2010: Antigua and Barbuda women's
- 2013–2015: Montserrat

Lenny Hewlett is an Antiguan professional football manager.

== Career ==
Since May 2013 he coached the Montserrat national football team.
