= Matt Robinson (footballer, born 1993) =

British association footballer and musician

Personal information
- Full name: Matthew James Robinson
- Date of birth: 12 November 1993 (age 32)
- Place of birth: Leicester, England
- Height: 6 ft 2 in (1.88 m)
- Position: Central midfielder

Team information
- Current team: Maidenhead United
- Number: 12

Youth career
- 2010–2012: Leicester City

Senior career*
Years	Team	Apps	(Gls)
2012–2016	Luton Town	46	(3)
2014	→ Kidderminster Harriers (loan)	6	(0)
2015	→ Grimsby Town (loan)	7	(1)
2015–2016	→ Woking (loan)	26	(2)
2016–2023	Dagenham & Redbridge	234	(21)
2023–2025	Woking	12	(0)
2023–2024	→ Boreham Wood (loan)	30	(4)
2024–2025	→ Braintree Town (loan)	43	(3)
2025–	Maidenhead United	48	(5)

International career^{‡}
2022	England C	1	(0)
- * Club domestic league appearances and goals as of 20:41, 10 October 2026 (UTC) ‡ National team caps and goals as of 20:42, 30 March 2022 (UTC)

Matthew James Robinson (born 12 November 1993) is an English professional footballer who plays as a central midfielder for National League South club Maidenhead United. He is also an MC, making music under the name Kamakaze.

He played in the Football League for Luton Town and has played for Kidderminster Harriers, Grimsby Town and Woking on loan, before spending seven years at Dagenham & Redbridge. He was also capped at England C level in 2022.

His song "Last Night", featuring Massappeals, was also added to the FIFA 20 soundtrack, leading Kamakaze to become the first person to have a song on FIFA's soundtrack while also previously having featured on FIFA as a football character.

== Football career ==
=== Early career ===
Born in Leicester, Leicestershire, Robinson began his career in the youth system at Leicester City. He made 43 appearances in the youth team over the course of two seasons, scoring 14 goals, but was not offered a contract and left the club in early 2012.

=== Luton Town ===
Robinson went on trial with Conference Premier club Luton Town later in 2012 and impressed manager Paul Buckle enough in pre-season to be offered a two-year professional contract. He made his debut as an 87th-minute substitute in a 2–0 win away to Kidderminster Harriers on 14 August 2012. Robinson made six substitute appearances and started two matches under Buckle, before starting six matches under new manager John Still following his appointment on 26 February 2013. He scored his first professional goal on the final day of 2012–13 in a 3–1 win away to Southport and finished the season with 14 appearances and one goal. In June 2013, Robinson signed a contract extension until June 2015.

Robinson was primarily an unused substitute for much of the first half of 2013–14, though he did play in Luton's FA Cup and FA Trophy matches. On 26 December 2013, fellow Luton midfielder Jonathan Smith suffered a double leg break during a 2–1 win away to Barnet, promoting Robinson to a more regular place in the team. He played in all but one of Luton's matches in the second half of the season, scoring his first goal of 2013–14 in a 3–0 win at home to Chester on 22 March 2014, and this was followed up with a goal in the following match, a 2–1 win away to Grimsby Town. 19-year-old Robinson, who played alongside 18-year-old Cameron McGeehan and 20-year-old Pelly Ruddock Mpanzu in a youthful midfield trio, was praised by Still for his performances. He finished the season with 31 appearances and two goals, as Luton won the Conference Premier title and therefore promotion into League Two.

He made his Football League debut in Luton's 1–0 victory away to Carlisle United on the opening day of 2014–15. On 1 October 2014, Robinson signed a three-year contract extension to keep him at Luton until June 2017.

On 31 October 2014, Robinson joined Kidderminster Harriers on a one-month loan. He went on to make six appearances for the Harriers before returning to Luton, declining the chance to stay for a further month to fight for his place at Luton. He made a total of 12 appearances for Luton throughout the season, but was placed on the club's transfer list in May 2015 alongside five other players.

On 21 August 2015, Robinson joined National League club Grimsby Town on a one-month loan.

On 23 October 2015, Robinson joined Woking on a one-month loan after failing to impress at Grimsby Town. He debuted a day later, starting in a 3–0 defeat away to Maidenhead United in the FA Cup fourth qualifying round. On 19 December 2015, Robinson scored his first Woking goal in a 5–1 victory away to Gateshead, in which he poked home a cross from Dan Holman. On 14 January 2016, Robinson's loan at Woking was extended until the end of the season. He completed the loan spell with 31 appearances and two goals.

On 10 May 2016, Luton announced that Robinson had once again been placed on the transfer list. However, just one week later, he was released from his contract by mutual consent one year early as part of the reorganisation of the squad by Luton manager Nathan Jones. He made 57 appearances and scored three goals since joining the club in 2012.

=== Dagenham & Redbridge ===
Robinson signed a two-year contract with newly relegated National League club Dagenham & Redbridge on 7 June 2016.

=== Woking ===
On 12 June 2023, following a seven-year spell with Dagenham & Redbridge, Robinson returned to Woking on a two-year deal.

On 29 September 2023, Robinson agreed to join fellow National League side, Boreham Wood on loan until 27 January 2024.

On the 30 July 2024, Robinson went on a season long loan to National League side Braintree.

On 6 May 2025, it was announced that Robinson would leave the club upon the expiry of his contract in June. He departed having made 12 appearances.

=== Maidenhead United ===
Robinson joined Maidenhead United for the 2025–26 season.

== International career ==
Robinson was called up to the England national C team on 20 October 2016 for an International Challenge Trophy match against the Estonia under-23 team.

== Music career ==
Robinson is an MC, performing under the stage name Kamakaze. He began writing lyrics around age 11-12, and has made music such as hip-hop, cloud rap, UK garage, and, most notably, grime.

In 2015, Kamakaze released a freestyle on JDZ Media, which by 2019 has reached over 3 million views. In 2019, Kamakaze performed a football freestyle on the BBC, and featured on the FIFA 20 Volta soundtrack alongside Leicester producer Massappeals. Kamakaze's song "Kam Dog" also featured on the gameplay trailer for FIFA 20 Volta. His song "Last Night", featuring Massappeals, was also added to the FIFA 20 soundtrack, leading Kamakaze to become the first person to have a song on FIFA's soundtrack while also previously having featured on FIFA as a football character. Kamakaze was nominated for the award of Best Grime Act at the 2022 MOBO awards.

== Personal life ==
In a March 2021 interview, Robinson revealed he had recently fathered a baby girl.

== Career statistics ==
As of 10 October 2026

Appearances and goals by club, season and competition
Club	Season	League			FA Cup		League Cup		Other		Total	
Club	Season	Division	Apps	Goals	Apps	Goals	Apps	Goals	Apps	Goals	Apps	Goals
Luton Town	2012–13	Conference Premier	10	1	2	0	—		2 (Note: Appearance(s) in FA Trophy)	0	14	1
Luton Town	2013–14	Conference Premier	27	2	1	0	—		3	0	31	2
Luton Town	2014–15	League Two	9	0	1	0	1	0	1 (Note: Appearance in Football League Trophy)	0	12	0
Luton Town	2015–16	League Two	0	0	—		0	0	0	0	0	0
Luton Town	Total		46	3	4	0	1	0	6	0	57	3
Kidderminster Harriers (loan)	2014–15	Conference Premier	6	0	—		—		—		6	0
Grimsby Town (loan)	2015–16	National League	7	1	—		—		—		7	1
Woking (loan)	2015–16	National League	26	2	1	0	—		4	0	31	2
Dagenham & Redbridge	2016–17	National League	20	0	2	0	—		0	0	22	0
Dagenham & Redbridge	2017–18	National League	34	0	0	0	—		1	0	35	0
Dagenham & Redbridge	2018–19	National League	39	1	2	0	—		0	0	41	1
Dagenham & Redbridge	2019–20	National League	33	0	1	0	—		1	0	35	0
Dagenham & Redbridge	2020–21	National League	26	8	0	0	—		1	0	27	8
Dagenham & Redbridge	2021–22	National League	40	9	2	0	—		1	0	43	9
Dagenham & Redbridge	2022–23	National League	42	3	4	1	—		2	0	48	4
Dagenham & Redbridge	Total		234	21	11	1	—		6	0	251	22
Woking	2023–24	National League	12	0	—		—		0	0	12	0
Woking	2024–25	National League	0	0	0	0	—		0	0	0	0
Woking	Total		12	0	0	0	—		0	0	12	0
Boreham Wood (loan)	2023–24	National League	30	4	2	1	—		1	0	33	5
Braintree Town (loan)	2024–25	National League	43	2	2	0	—		5 (Note: One appearance in FA Trophy, four appearances in National League Cup)	0	50	2
Maidenhead United	2025–26	National League South	45	5	1	0	—		2 (Note: One appearance in FA Trophy, one appearance in National League South playoffs)	0	48	5
Maidenhead United	2026–27	National League South	3	0	1	0	—		1 (Note: Appearances in Berks & Bucks Senior Cup)	1	5	1
Maidenhead United	Total		48	5	2	0	—		3	1	53	6
Career total			452	38	22	2	1	0	25	1	499	41

== Honours ==
Luton Town

- Conference Premier: 2013–14
