= 2013–14 Luton Town F.C. season =

English football club season

Luton Town F.C.
2013–14 season
- Owner: Luton Town Football Club 2020 Limited
- Chairman: Nick Owen
- Manager: John Still
- Stadium: Kenilworth Road
- Conference Premier: 1st (promoted)
- FA Cup: First round
- FA Trophy: Third round
- Top goalscorer: League: Andre Gray (30); All: Andre Gray (30)
- Highest home attendance: 10,044 vs Forest Green Rovers, Conference Premier, 21 April 2014
- Lowest home attendance: 911 vs Staines Town, FA Trophy, 3 December 2013
- Average home league attendance: 7,387
Home colours	Away colours	Third colours

The 2013–14 season was the 128th in the history of Luton Town Football Club and the club's fifth consecutive season in non-League football following a seventh-place finish in the 2012–13 campaign. In manager John Still's first full season in charge, Luton won promotion to the Football League and were crowned Conference Premier champions.

Luton started their 2013–14 campaign slowly, scoring only two goals from open play in their first eight games to leave the club in the lower reaches of mid-table. However, performances and results soon picked up, resulting in a club-record 27-match unbeaten run in which the team scored 78 goals. Luton reached the top of the table just before the turn of the year and remained in that position for the rest of the campaign. Promotion to League Two was confirmed on 15 April 2014 after nearest rivals Cambridge United failed to win; Luton eventually ended the season 19 points ahead of them. Luton accumulated 101 points and kept 23 clean sheets, both club records, while also equalling the club record for the fewest goals conceded over a season (35).

This article covers the period from 1 July 2013 to 30 June 2014.

== Background ==
After two unsuccessful attempts for promotion back to the Football League in the 2009–10 and 2010–11 seasons, Luton dismissed manager Gary Brabin and appointed Paul Buckle in April 2012 in an attempt to reach the play-offs as the 2011–12 campaign drew to a close. Buckle oversaw five wins in eight games as Luton reached the play-off final, though ultimately lost to York City. Buckle quickly began moulding his own team for the 2012–13 season, releasing 14 players and signing eight new ones, although two signings in the form of Garry Richards and Danny Spiller did not play a single game as they both suffered long-term injuries. The club started the season well, and was one point from the top of the table after the first third of the season. However, the club's league form soon nosedived and they went on to win only three league games over the course of the next four months. Victories over higher-league opponents Wolverhampton Wanderers and Norwich City in the FA Cup gave some respite, but "genuine personal reasons" saw Paul Buckle leave the club in February. Under his replacement, John Still, performances and results gradually picked up to culminate in a late five-game unbeaten run, but the club could not challenge for a play-off finish and ended the season in a club-record low of seventh place.

Still began his own rebuilding of the squad a month before the last game of the season by releasing six players. He later released three more, transfer listed five others, and then signed players he had either worked with or scouted previously at Dagenham & Redbridge in the form of Solomon Taiwo, Scott Griffiths, Alex Wall and Elliot Justham. Defender Anthony Charles, who had won the Conference with two other clubs, and Hull City striker Mark Cullen also joined the club in the close-season. Still committed existing players to new contracts, with goalkeeper Mark Tyler, defender Steve McNulty, midfielders Matt Robinson and Dave Martin, and player of the season Alex Lawless signing new deals.

== Review ==
=== July ===
The opening of the transfer window on 1 July saw Southport players Andy Parry and Shaun Whalley sign for undisclosed fees, and out-of-contract Histon duo Danny Fitzsimons and Jim Stevenson also join the club. Striker Dan Walker joined Hereford United on a free transfer. Transfer-listed goalkeeper Dean Brill moved on loan to Scottish Premier League club Inverness Caledonian Thistle on 2 July until January 2014. Injured midfielder Danny Spiller and transfer-listed defender Simon Ainge both had their contracts terminated by the club on 4 July. In addition to changes in the playing staff, there were also alterations to the backroom team, as first team coach Alan Neilson left to be replaced by Grays Athletic manager Hakan Hayrettin on 5 July. Long-serving goalkeeping coach Dmitri Kharine also left the club. Kharine was ultimately replaced in the role by Jeff Wood. Later in the month, Luton signed former Northampton Town midfielder Luke Guttridge on a free transfer. The 31-year-old signed a two-year contract.

Luton's first team played a number of local friendly matches, winning two and losing one, before hosting Premier League club Aston Villa at Kenilworth Road on 23 July. Luton beat their higher-level opponents 2–0 with goals from Jon Shaw and Jake Howells. This was followed up with a 3–0 win four days later over League Two club Dagenham & Redbridge.

=== August ===
Luton's first team ended pre-season with a 7–0 win over Arsenal Reserves on 3 August. Ronnie Henry was confirmed as the club's captain for the second season in a row.

Luton lost 1–0 to Southport on the opening day of the season on 10 August, with Shaun Whalley missing a penalty and Steve McNulty being sent off in the second half. After video evidence contradicted the referee's assessment of violent conduct, McNulty's red card was overturned on appeal in time for the match against Salisbury City three days later. Luton won the game 2–0, which was then followed by a 1–1 draw with Macclesfield Town on 17 August where Luke Guttridge scored deep into injury time. Luton then drew 0–0 in consecutive matches with title favourites Forest Green Rovers and league leaders Cambridge United to leave themselves in 14th place in the table. John Still acknowledged his team's lack of goals in their opening five games and, combined with injuries to strikers Mark Cullen, Jon Shaw and Alex Wall, he signed prolific forward Paul Benson on a season-long loan from League One club Swindon Town on 26 August. Shaw underwent an operation for a hernia a few days after Benson signed, ruling him out for six weeks. Luton ended August with a 2–0 win away to Kidderminster Harriers, Jake Howells scoring two penalties, placing the club into eleventh in the table.

=== September ===
Transfer-listed defender Lathaniel Rowe-Turner joined fellow-Conference team Alfreton Town on loan until January 2014 on the day of the transfer deadline. Youth team graduates Jerome Jibodu and Jake Woolley both joined Conference South club Boreham Wood on three-month loans on 6 September. Scott Rendell then joined Woking on loan a week later.

Luton drew 0–0 for the third time in four games on 7 September with a stalemate against Grimsby Town. They then lost 2–0 at Wrexham on 13 September with Alex Wall sent off late on. The previous season's player of the year Alex Lawless made his first start on 17 September upon returning from injury, inspiring Luton to a 3–0 win over Dartford in which he scored one goal and set up another.

After impressing in youth team and development squad games, 17-year-old striker Zane Banton signed a two-year professional contract with the club on 19 September. Striker Mark Cullen scored his first two goals for the club in a 3–2 home win over Lincoln City on 21 September. Cullen scored two more, with Alex Lacey scoring his first for the club and Andre Gray his first of the season, in a 4–0 win over Woking on 24 September. Luton ended the month with a 0–0 draw away to Hereford United, putting the club into sixth place in the table. The club signed French-Portuguese midfielder David Viana on a contract until the end of the season on 30 September. Viana had impressed John Still while on trial, scoring two goals in development games.

=== October ===
On 4 October, young defender Brett Longden joined Boreham Wood on a one-month loan. Striker Jake Woolley returned from his own loan at Boreham Wood after less than a month. Luton beat FC Halifax Town 4–3 on 5 October, coming from 3–1 down to win the game with a 25-yard goal from Alex Wall late on. The team then drew 3–3 away at Aldershot Town on 8 October to move into fourth position in the table. A hat-trick from Andre Gray and a goal from Luke Guttridge saw Luton beat basement club Hyde 4–1 on 12 October to extend their unbeaten run to seven games. Injured defender Garry Richards, who was yet to make an appearance for the club since signing in the summer of 2012, was released from his contract on 14 October and announced his retirement from football soon after. Jake Woolley joined Southern League Premier Division club St Neots Town on a one-month loan the same day. The club were involved in another high-scoring game on 19 October, winning 4–3 away to Tamworth with two goals from Paul Benson and long-range strikes from Jonathan Smith and Andy Parry.

Luton progressed into the first round of the FA Cup on 26 October with a 1–0 away win over Woking.

=== November ===
The club returned to league games on 2 November, drawing 0–0 with Gateshead in weather described by manager John Still as "as bad conditions as I can remember a team playing in". Luton were knocked out of the FA Cup on 9 November at the first round stage, going down 2–1 away to Welling United. On-loan goalkeeper Dean Brill was released from his Luton contract on 12 November in order to join Inverness Caledonian Thistle on a permanent deal. The same day saw Luton move to second in the table, seven points behind leaders Cambridge United, with a 2–1 victory over Braintree Town. The club then extended their unbeaten league run to 11 games as they drew 1–1 away to Chester on 16 November.

Winger Dave Martin joined Dartford on a one-month loan on 18 November. Luton played their first home game in seven matches on 23 November, winning 2–1 against Welling United after Andre Gray scored both goals. This was followed up with a 3–0 home win over Southport on 26 November, with defender Steve McNulty scoring a "spectacular" 25-yard volley.

On 28 November, injuries to defenders Anthony Charles, Alex Lacey, Andy Parry and Steve McNulty, coupled with the impending closure of the loan transfer window, saw the club act to sign three defenders on loan: Joe Davis arrived from Port Vale, Alfie Mawson from Brentford, and Pelly Ruddock Mpanzu, who was also able to play in midfield, from West Ham United. In addition, midfielders JJ O'Donnell and Jim Stevenson, who had featured in only a handful of games, were sent on loan to Hyde and Dartford respectively. All five loans were agreed until 4 January. A youthful Luton team, which included Davis and Mpanzu alongside four youth team players, drew 0–0 with Staines Town in the first round of the FA Trophy on 30 November.

=== December ===
Luton won their FA Trophy replay against Staines Town on 3 December, setting up a second round tie at home to Wrexham. The club then equalled their biggest ever away win with a 5–0 victory at Alfreton Town in the league on 7 December. Four goals in just eight minutes, two from Andre Gray and one each from Paul Benson and Luke Guttridge, left Luton 4–0 up at half-time, and an Alex Lawless goal in the second half completed the scoring. A Luton team featuring a number of youth team players beat FA Trophy holders Wrexham 2–0 on 14 December to progress to the third round. The club then won their ninth home game in a row on 21 December, beating Gateshead 4–2 to move just one point behind league leaders Cambridge United. Managing director Gary Sweet confirmed the same day that John Still had signed a contract extension to 2015 with the condition that, for each promotion the club won, an additional year would be added to the contract.

The club made it 16 league games unbeaten with a 2–1 away victory over Barnet on Boxing Day. The win was, however, overshadowed by a serious injury to Jonathan Smith, who fractured both his right tibia and fibula. Out of favour midfielder Arnaud Mendy was released by the club on 27 December.

Despite the setback of potentially losing Smith for the rest of the campaign, Luton went on to record their then-biggest victory of the season on 28 December by defeating Kidderminster Harriers 6–0 in front of 8,488 people at Kenilworth Road, which moved the club into first place in the table. Luke Guttridge and substitute Jake Howells scored two apiece, with goals also coming from Paul Benson and a first for the club by full-back Scott Griffiths. Luton's run of six victories throughout December was recognised with John Still winning the Manager of the Month award and striker Paul Benson winning Player of the Month. On 30 December, midfield loanee Pelly Ruddock Mpanzu was recalled early by his parent club West Ham United to cover their injury crisis.

=== January ===
Luton began 2014 with a 2–1 home victory over Barnet, their seventh consecutive league win, in wet conditions on New Year's Day that almost saw the game abandoned. With midfielders in short supply at the club, John Still moved on 3 January to sign Peterborough United's Kane Ferdinand on loan until the end of the season. Luton equalled a long-standing club record of 19 league games unbeaten after drawing 0–0 away to Lincoln City on 4 January.

Following the completion of the loans of defenders Joe Davis and Alfie Mawson, Luton moved to sign Crystal Palace centre-back Ryan Inniss on a one-month loan on 10 January. Inniss scored five minutes into his debut as Luton drew 2–2 with Cambridge United in the FA Trophy on 11 January. In the replay three days later, Luton lost 1–0 – their first home defeat of the season – and were knocked out of the competition at the third round. The club signed Norwich City's FA Youth Cup winning captain Cameron McGeehan on a 28-day youth loan on 16 January. The next day saw a busy period of transfer activity, as Welling United defender Fraser Franks was signed for an undisclosed fee on a contract until July 2015, while fringe players Alex Wall and JJ O'Donnell were loaned out to Dartford and Gateshead respectively for one month.

Luton's home game against Wrexham on 18 January was postponed due to a waterlogged pitch. Winger Shaun Whalley joined Conference North club A.F.C. Telford United on a one-month loan on 23 January. Luton played their first league game in three weeks on 25 January, winning 3–0 against Nuneaton Town courtesy of an Andre Gray hat-trick and stretching their unbeaten league run to 20 games; a new club record.

On 28 January, former loanee Pelly Ruddock Mpanzu signed permanently for Luton from West Ham United on a two-and-a-half-year contract for an undisclosed fee, in a transfer described as a "major coup". On the same day, Luton signed versatile left-sided player Jernade Meade on loan until the end of the season from Swansea City. Transfer-listed striker Scott Rendell mutually agreed for his contract to be terminated on 30 January, and he later joined Woking. JJ O'Donnell and Jim Stevenson extended their loans at Gateshead and Dartford until the end of the season later that day. The last day of the transfer window saw midfielder Solomon Taiwo, who had struggled with injury throughout the season, join Aldershot Town on a one-month loan.

=== February ===
Luton's match away at Dartford, scheduled for 1 February, was postponed due to a waterlogged pitch. With no improvement in weather conditions, the club's home match against Tamworth on 8 February was also postponed. The club played their first game in 16 days on 11 February away at Macclesfield Town, who were behind only Luton in terms of the league's in-form teams. Luton won the match 2–1 with two goals from Andre Gray, though were indebted to goalkeeper Mark Tyler for a number of important saves.

On 13 February, 17-year-old midfielder Ian Rees signed a professional contract with the club until the end of the 2014–15 season.

Luton recorded their biggest win of the season on 15 February, thrashing Hereford United 7–0 at Kenilworth Road. An Andre Gray hat-trick and goals from Paul Benson, Jake Howells, Pelly Ruddock Mpanzu and Alex Lawless placed the club nine points clear at the top of the table. Midfielder Cameron McGeehan extended his loan from Norwich City until the end of the season on 18 February, while Alex Wall's loan at Dartford was extended for a further month.

The club continued their goalscoring form, winning 5–0 at Nuneaton Town on 22 February and then 5–0 again at home to Wrexham three days later, which took their goal difference to +55. Four wins from four games throughout the month, which saw nineteen goals scored and only one conceded, led to John Still winning the Manager of the Month award. Andre Gray's seven goals in four games saw him named as the Conference Premier Player of the Month.

=== March ===
The club beat play-off chasing Alfreton Town 3–0 on 1 March to maintain their 14-point lead at the top of the table. Youth team graduates Zane Banton, Brett Longden and Ian Rees were loaned out to Conference South clubs in early March; Longden joined Maidenhead United, while both Banton and Rees signed for Concord Rangers.

Luton drew 0–0 away to Salisbury City on 8 March to secure a fifth consecutive clean sheet. A short trip to nearest title challengers Cambridge United then followed on 11 March. Luton went 1–0 down – the first time they had been in a losing position in a league game since October – but a late equaliser from substitute Mark Cullen resulted in a 1–1 draw and left the club 15 points clear at the top of the table. Luton then lost their first league game in almost six months – a run stretching 27 matches – on 17 March at home to Woking. The club lost 1–0 in a game that Woking dominated for large periods.

The club signed winger Luke Rooney on a contract until the end of the season on 21 March. Rooney had previously been playing for Maidstone United on non-contract terms following his release from League One club Swindon Town in late 2013. The club allowed transfer-listed defender Lathaniel Rowe-Turner to rejoin Alfreton Town on loan until the end of the season, while also extending the loan of the in-form Alex Wall at Dartford by a further month.

Luton then won their first game for over three weeks, beating Chester 3–0 on 22 March with goals from Matt Robinson, Andre Gray and Paul Benson. The club made it 15 consecutive away league games unbeaten with a 2–1 win at play-off chasing Grimsby Town three days later; Robinson and Benson were again on the scoresheet. The club's away unbeaten record ended on 29 March with a 2–0 defeat to in-form FC Halifax Town.

=== April ===
Luton signed striker Andy Mangan on loan from Forest Green Rovers on 1 April; the paperwork had been completed a week before when the loan transfer window was open, but a contractual issue had prevented Mangan from signing until April. The club secured victory over Dartford that evening, coming from a goal behind to win 2–1 with late goals from Pelly Ruddock Mpanzu and Andre Gray. The result left Luton needing three wins from their remaining six games to be assured of promotion.

On 3 April, young centre-back Alex Lacey signed a two-year contract extension.

Luton won 1–0 against Aldershot Town on 5 April, with Cameron McGeehan scoring his first goal for the club, and then followed this up with a 2–0 victory over Tamworth three days later. McGeehan netted again and Mark Cullen was also on the scoresheet, his eighth goal of the season, to leave Luton on the cusp of returning to the Football League.

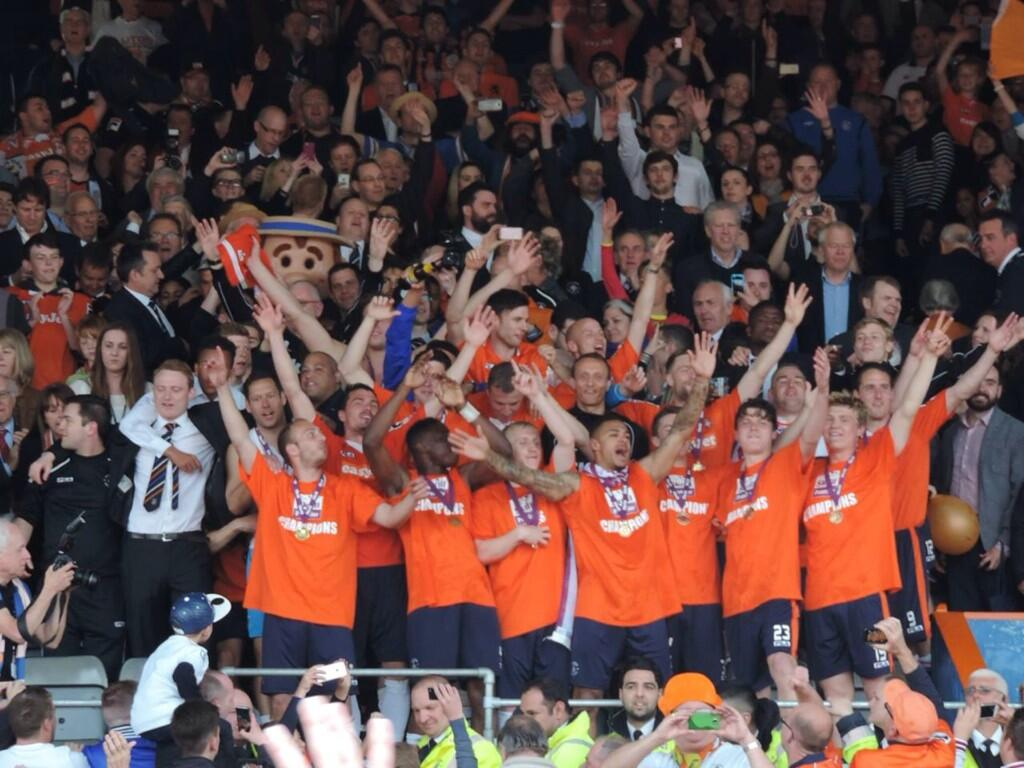
Luton Town players and staff celebrate winning the Conference Premier in the aftermath of a 4–1 victory over Forest Green Rovers

Luton missed their opportunity to confirm promotion on their own terms, losing 3–2 at home to Braintree Town on 12 April in an incident-filled game played front of the biggest number of Luton fans at Kenilworth Road in over 20 years. However, on 15 April, a 2–0 defeat for nearest rivals Cambridge United to Kidderminster Harriers meant that Luton were mathematically confirmed as Conference Premier champions with three league games left to play, and would contest the next season in League Two.

A youthful Luton team beat Welling United 2–1 on 19 April, the club's eleventh away league victory of the season. The final home match of the season two days later saw Luton run out as 4–1 victors over Forest Green Rovers, with Andre Gray scoring his 30th goal of the campaign. The club ended the season on 26 April with a 1–0 win against bottom-of-the-table Hyde, Alex Wall scoring his fourth goal of the season, as they finished on a club-record breaking 101 points. In addition, Luton set a new club record for the most number of clean sheets in a league season (23), the largest-ever points gap in the Conference Premier between champions and second place (19), and striker Andre Gray won the Conference Premier Golden Boot as the league's top scorer with 30 goals. The Hyde game also saw the return of midfielder Jonathan Smith; he entered play as a late substitute four months to the day after suffering a broken leg.

=== May ===
Transfer-listed defender Lathaniel Rowe-Turner was released from his contract two months early on 7 May. Youth team graduates Jerome Jibodu and Jake Woolley were also released. On 9 May, the club confirmed that Anthony Charles, Jon Shaw and David Viana would not be offered new contracts and would leave the club in June. In addition, midfielders Dave Martin and Solomon Taiwo were placed on the transfer list.

Forward Mark Cullen signed a contract extension through to 2017 on 15 May and, later the same day, Luton made their first signing of the close-season with Lowestoft Town defender Curtley Williams signing a two-year contract.

Following the completion of the play-offs and the Conference Premier season officially ending, it was announced that John Still had been awarded the Manager of the Month prize for April, while midfielder Cameron McGeehan was given the Player of the Month award.

== Match results ==
Luton Town results given first.

=== Legend ===
Win	Draw	Loss

=== Pre-season friendlies ===
13 July 2013	Boreham Wood	1–0	Luton Town	Meadow Park, Borehamwood
15:00	Simmonds 5'	Report		Attendance: 372

15 July 2013	Biggleswade Town	1–1 (2–3 p)	Luton Town XI	Carlsberg Stadium, Biggleswade
19:45	Witham 52'	Report	Banton 60'	Attendance: 130
	Penalties
	York (penalty scored); Kilroy (penalty missed); Lewis (penalty scored); Mason (penalty missed); Allinson (penalty missed)		O'Donnell (penalty scored); Aujla (penalty missed); C. Smith (penalty scored); Banton (penalty scored)

16 July 2013	Hitchin Town	0–4	Luton Town	Top Field, Hitchin
19:45		Report	Shaw 74'; Whalley 79' (pen.); Martin 83'; Smith 90'	Attendance: 1,103

20 July 2013	Maidenhead United	0–1	Luton Town	York Road, Maidenhead
15:00		Report	Cullen 22'	Attendance: Unknown

23 July 2013	Luton Town	2–0	Aston Villa	Kenilworth Road, Luton
19:45	Shaw 23'; Howells 78'	Report		Attendance: 4,304

25 July 2013	Dunstable Town	2–0	Luton Town XI	Creasey Park, Dunstable
19:45	Nolan 24'; Roache 72'	Report		Attendance: 654

27 July 2013	Luton Town	3–0	Dagenham & Redbridge	Kenilworth Road, Luton
15:00	Cullen 3'; Lacey 62'; Whalley 77'	Report		Attendance: 1,508

30 July 2013	Maidstone United	0–2	Luton Town	Gallagher Stadium, Maidstone
19:45		Report	Woolley 50'; Robinson 90'	Attendance: 937

1 August 2013	Histon	0–1	Luton Town	Bridge Road, Impington
19:45		Report	Banton 88'	Attendance: Unknown

3 August 2013	Luton Town	7–0	Arsenal XI	Kenilworth Road, Luton
15:00	Cullen 19', 29'; Whalley 31' (pen.); Howells 38', 52'; Gray 65', 89'	Report		Attendance: 2,411

5 August 2013	Thurrock	2–4	Luton Town	Ship Lane, Aveley
19:45	Perkins 34', 37'	Report	Longden 4'; Banton 53'; Hughes 78'; Robinson 82'	Attendance: Unknown

=== Conference Premier ===
==== Table ====
Pos	Team	Pld	W	D	L	GF	GA	GD	Pts	Promotion, qualification or relegation
1	Luton Town (C, P)	46	30	11	5	102	35	+67	101	Promotion to Football League Two
2	Cambridge United (O, P)	46	23	13	10	72	35	+37	82	Qualification for the Conference Premier play-offs
3	Gateshead	46	22	13	11	72	50	+22	79	Qualification for the Conference Premier play-offs
4	Grimsby Town	46	22	12	12	65	46	+19	78	Qualification for the Conference Premier play-offs
5	FC Halifax Town	46	22	11	13	85	58	+27	77	Qualification for the Conference Premier play-offs

Source: Football Conference
Rules for classification: 1) points; 2) goal difference; 3) number of goals scored.
(C) Champions; (O) Play-off winners; (P) Promoted

==== Results by round ====
Round	1	2	3	4	5	6	7	8	9	10	11	12	13	14	15	16	17	18	19	20	21	22	23	24	25	26	27	28	29	30	31	32	33	34	35	36	37	38	39	40	41	42	43	44	45	46
Ground	A	H	H	A	H	A	H	A	H	H	A	A	H	A	H	A	A	A	A	H	H	A	H	A	H	H	A	H	A	H	A	H	H	A	A	H	H	A	A	A	H	H	H	A	H	A
Result	L	W	D	D	D	W	D	L	W	W	W	D	W	D	W	W	D	W	D	W	W	W	W	W	W	W	D	W	W	W	W	W	W	D	D	L	W	W	L	W	W	W	L	W	W	W
Position	17	12	13	14	14	11	13	14	11	9	5	6	5	4	3	3	3	2	3	3	2	2	2	2	1	1	1	1	1	1	1	1	1	1	1	1	1	1	1	1	1	1	1	1	1	1

Updated to match(es) played on 27 April 2014. Source: lutontoday.co.uk
A = Away; H = Home; W = Win; D = Draw; L = Loss

==== Fixtures and results ====
10 August 2013 1	Southport	1–0	Luton Town	Haig Avenue, Southport
15:00	Milligan 22'	Report	McNulty (red card) 58'; Whalley (penalty missed) 76'	Attendance: 2,210

13 August 2013 2	Luton Town	2–0	Salisbury City	Kenilworth Road, Luton
19:45	Taiwo 64' (pen.); Guttridge 81'	Report		Attendance: 6,520

17 August 2013 3	Luton Town	1–1	Macclesfield Town	Kenilworth Road, Luton
15:00	Guttridge 90+7'	Report	Holroyd 63'	Attendance: 6,216

24 August 2013 4	Forest Green Rovers	0–0	Luton Town	The New Lawn, Nailsworth
15:00		Report		Attendance: 1,858

26 August 2013 5	Luton Town	0–0	Cambridge United	Kenilworth Road, Luton
15:00		Report		Attendance: 7,517

31 August 2013 6	Kidderminster Harriers	0–2	Luton Town	Aggborough, Kidderminster
15:00		Report	Howells 70' (pen.), 81' (pen.)	Attendance: 2,866

7 September 2013 7	Luton Town	0–0	Grimsby Town	Kenilworth Road, Luton
17:30		Report		Attendance: 6,131

13 September 2013 8	Wrexham	2–0	Luton Town	Racecourse Ground, Wrexham
19:45	Bishop 21'; Hunt 58'	Report	Wall (red card) 80'	Attendance: 3,122

17 September 2013 9	Luton Town	3–0	Dartford	Kenilworth Road, Luton
19:45	Benson 30'; Guttridge 33'; Lawless 64'	Report		Attendance: 5,433

21 September 2013 10	Luton Town	3–2	Lincoln Town	Kenilworth Road, Luton
15:00	Cullen 46', 80'; Guttridge 77'	Report	Power 20'; Tomlinson 51'	Attendance: 6,203

24 September 2013 11	Woking	0–4	Luton Town	Kingfield Stadium, Woking
19:45		Report	Cullen 28', 45+1'; Lacey 35'; Gray 70'	Attendance: 1,955

28 September 2013 12	Hereford United	0–0	Luton Town	Edgar Street, Hereford
15:00		Report		Attendance: 2,386

5 October 2013 13	Luton Town	4–3	FC Halifax Town	Kenilworth Road, Luton
15:00	Guttridge 16'; Benson 33'; Gray 39'; Wall 83'	Report	Marshall 3'; Ainge 19'; Gardner 23'	Attendance: 6,519

8 October 2013 14	Aldershot Town	3–3	Luton Town	Recreation Ground, Aldershot
19:45	Goodman 13'; Roberts 24'; Molesley 45'	Report	Gray 3'; Parry 16'; Whalley 80' (pen.)	Attendance: 2,683

12 October 2013 15	Luton Town	4–1	Hyde	Kenilworth Road, Luton
15:00	Gray 16', 55', 79'; Guttridge 51'	Report	McNulty (o.g.) 45'; Ashworth (red card) 68'	Attendance: 7,081

19 October 2013 16	Tamworth	3–4	Luton Town	The Lamb Ground, Tamworth
15:00	Courtney 13', 76'; Elford-Alliyu 64' (pen.)	Report	Smith 31'; Parry 41'; Benson 46', 54'	Attendance: 2,066

2 November 2013 17	Gateshead	0–0	Luton Town	Gateshead International Stadium, Gateshead
15:00		Report		Attendance: 1,080

12 November 2013 18	Braintree Town	1–2	Luton Town	Cressing Road, Braintree
19:45	Holman 67'	Report	Benson 30'; Parry 65'	Attendance: 1,518

16 November 2013 19	Chester	1–1	Luton Town	Deva Stadium, Chester
15:00	Seddon 23'	Report	Gray 11'	Attendance: 3,291

23 November 2013 20	Luton Town	2–1	Welling United	Kenilworth Road, Luton
15:00	Gray 17', 79'	Report	Dyer 47'; Franks (red card) 90+4'	Attendance: 6,592

26 November 2013 21	Luton Town	3–0	Southport	Kenilworth Road, Luton
19:45	McNulty 30'; Smith 66'; Gray 75'	Report		Attendance: 6,057

7 December 2013 22	Alfreton Town	0–5	Luton Town	North Street, Alfreton
15:00		Report	Gray 10', 14'; Benson 13'; Guttridge 18'; Lawless 67'	Attendance: 1,279

21 December 2013 23	Luton Town	4–2	Gateshead	Kenilworth Road, Luton
15:00	Benson 16'; Lawless 27', 60'; Gray 30'	Report	Oster 70'; Hatch 84'	Attendance: 6,913

26 December 2013 24	Barnet	1–2	Luton Town	The Hive Stadium, Canons Park
15:00	Nurse (red card) 45+3'; Hyde 69'	Report	Benson 22'; Lawless 34'	Attendance: 3,608

28 December 2013 25	Luton Town	6–0	Kidderminster Harriers	Kenilworth Road, Luton
15:00	Guttridge 28', 86'; Benson 52'; Howells 56' (pen.) 70'; Griffiths 79'	Report	Dunkley (red card) 55'	Attendance: 8,488

1 January 2014 26	Luton Town	2–1	Barnet	Kenilworth Road, Luton
12:00	Gray 2'; Benson 31'	Report	Hyde 71'	Attendance: 7,543

4 January 2014 27	Lincoln City	0–0	Luton Town	Sincil Bank, Lincoln
13:00		Report		Attendance: 2,928

25 January 2014 28	Luton Town	3–0	Nuneaton Town	Kenilworth Road, Luton
15:00	Gray 50', 64', 77'	Report		Attendance: 7,310

11 February 2014 29	Macclesfield Town	1–2	Luton Town	Moss Rose, Macclesfield
19:45	Andrew 38'	Report	Gray 9', 82'	Attendance: 1,705

15 February 2014 30	Luton Town	7–0	Hereford United	Kenilworth Road, Luton
15:00	Gray 12', 68', 82'; Benson 49'; Howells 56' (pen.); Mpanzu 60'; Lawless 90+3'	Report		Attendance: 7,111

22 February 2014 31	Nuneaton Town	0–5	Luton Town	Liberty Way, Nuneaton
15:00		Report	Benson 34', 81'; Gray 64'; Guttridge 70'; Howells 85'	Attendance: 3,480

25 February 2014 32	Luton Town	5–0	Wrexham	Kenilworth Road, Luton
19:45	Guttridge 3', 17'; Gray 9'; Benson 38'; Howells 70' (pen.)	Report		Attendance: 7,526

1 March 2014 33	Luton Town	3–0	Alfreton Town	Kenilworth Road, Luton
15:00	Guttridge 29'; Gray 52'; Benson 86'	Report		Attendance: 8,412

8 March 2014 34	Salisbury City	0–0	Luton Town	The Raymond McEnhill Stadium, Salisbury
15:00		Report		Attendance: 2,633

11 March 2014 35	Cambridge United	1–1	Luton Town	Abbey Stadium, Cambridge
19:45	Elliott 62'	Report	Cullen 90'	Attendance: 6,050

17 March 2014 36	Luton Town	0–1	Woking	Kenilworth Road, Luton
19:45		Report	Sole 87'	Attendance: 6,683

22 March 2014 37	Luton Town	3–0	Chester	Kenilworth Road, Luton
15:00	Robinson 70'; Gray 82'; Benson 90+2'	Report		Attendance: 8,475

25 March 2014 38	Grimsby Town	1–2	Luton Town	Blundell Park, Cleethorpes
19:45	Neilson 19'	Report	Robinson 21'; Benson 61'	Attendance: 3,789

29 March 2014 39	FC Halifax Town	2–0	Luton Town	The Shay, Halifax
15:00	Roberts 18'; Gregory 69'	Report		Attendance: 3,586

1 April 2014 40	Dartford	1–2	Luton Town	Princes Park, Dartford
19:45	Suarez 34'; Clark (red card) 78'	Report	Mpanzu 83'; Gray 86'	Attendance: 2,869

5 April 2014 41	Luton Town	1–0	Aldershot Town	Kenilworth Road, Luton
15:00	McGeehan 85'	Report		Attendance: 8,558

8 April 2014 42	Luton Town	2–0	Tamworth	Kenilworth Road, Luton
19:45	McGeehan 49'; Cullen 65'	Report		Attendance: 8,554

12 April 2014 43	Luton Town	2–3	Braintree Town	Kenilworth Road, Luton
12:52	Howells 62' (pen.); Wall 65'	Report	Wells 16'; Mulley 21'; Hamann (red card) 30'; Isaac 56'	Attendance: 10,020

19 April 2014 44	Welling United	1–2	Luton Town	Park View Road, Welling
12:30	Lafayette 80'	Report	Cullen 28'; Gray 72'	Attendance: 2,650

21 April 2014 45	Luton Town	4–1	Forest Green Rovers	Kenilworth Road, Luton
15:00	Gray 45+1' (pen.) 60'; McGeehan 56'; Cullen 90+3'	Report	Klukowski 34' (pen.)	Attendance: 10,044

26 April 2014 46	Hyde	0–1	Luton Town	Ewen Fields, Hyde
17:30		Report	Wall 70'	Attendance: 2,729

=== FA Cup ===
26 October 2013 4Q	Woking	0–1	Luton Town	Kingfield Stadium, Woking
15:00		Report	Cullen 32'	Attendance: 1,452

9 November 2013 1R	Welling United	2–1	Luton Town	Park View Road, Welling
15:00	Clarke 28'; Healy 44'	Report	Benson 57'	Attendance: 1,555

=== FA Trophy ===
30 November 2013 1R	Staines Town	0–0	Luton Town	Wheatsheaf Park, Staines-upon-Thames
15:00	Brown (red card) 30'	Report		Attendance: 621

3 December 2013 1R replay	Luton Town	2–0	Staines Town	Kenilworth Road, Luton
19:45	Parry 50'; Whalley 71'	Report		Attendance: 911

14 December 2013 2R	Luton Town	2–0	Wrexham	Kenilworth Road, Luton
15:00	Cullen 15'; Ashton 77' (o.g.)	Report	Harris (red card) 64'	Attendance: 1,617

11 January 2014 3R	Cambridge United	2–2	Luton Town	Abbey Stadium, Cambridge
15:00	Taylor (penalty missed) 45+3'; Elliot 73'; Chambers 74'	Report	Inniss 4'; Wall 48'	Attendance: 3,194

14 January 2014 3R replay	Luton Town	0–1	Cambridge United	Kenilworth Road, Luton
19:45		Report	Chambers 39'	Attendance: 2,312

== Player statistics ==
No.	Pos.	Name	League		FA Cup		FA Trophy		Total		Discipline	
No.	Pos.	Name	Apps	Goals	Apps	Goals	Apps	Goals	Apps	Goals	Yellow card	Red card
1	GK	(England) Mark Tyler	46	0	0	0	0	0	46	0	0	0
2	DF	(England) Fraser Franks	17	0	0	0	0	0	17	0	2	0
3	DF	(Republic of Ireland) Danny Fitzsimons	0	0	0	0	0	0	0	0	0	0
4	MF	(England) Jonathan Smith	22 (2)	2	2	0	0	0	24 (2)	2	5	0
5	DF	(England) Steve McNulty (vice-captain)	46	1	2	0	0	0	48	1	4	0
6	DF	(England) Anthony Charles	1 (3)	0	1	0	3	0	5 (3)	0	1	0
7	MF	(Wales) Alex Lawless	23 (8)	6	1	0	0	0	24 (8)	6	1	0
8	MF	(Nigeria) Solomon Taiwo	3 (2)	1	0	0	2	0	5 (2)	1	2	0
9	FW	(England) Jon Shaw	4 (7)	0	0	0	1 (1)	0	5 (8)	0	1	0
10	FW	(England) Alex Wall	1 (9)	3	0	0	4 (1)	1	5 (10)	4	3	1
11	MF	(Wales) Jake Howells	28 (7)	8	2	0	4	0	34 (7)	8	3	0
12	DF	(England) Scott Griffiths	46	1	0	0	0	0	46	1	5	0
13	FW	(England) Mark Cullen	12 (17)	8	2	1	5	1	19 (17)	10	0	0
14	DF/MF	(England) Andy Parry	18 (5)	3	1 (1)	0	1	1	20 (6)	4	3	0
15	DF	(England) Ryan Inniss	1	0	0	0	2	1	3	1	0	0
15	MF	(England) Luke Rooney	2 (4)	0	0	0	0	0	2 (4)	0	0	0
16	GK	(England) Elliot Justham	0	0	2	0	5	0	7	0	0	0
17	MF	(England) JJ O'Donnell	0 (2)	0	0 (1)	0	0	0	0 (3)	0	0	0
18	MF	(England) Dave Martin	3 (4)	0	2	0	0	0	5 (4)	0	0	0
19	DF	(England) Joe Davis	5 (1)	0	0	0	3	0	8 (1)	0	0	0
19	MF	(Northern Ireland) Cameron McGeehan	18	3	0	0	0	0	18	3	2	0
20	MF	(Portugal) David Viana	0	0	0	0	2 (1)	0	2 (1)	0	0	0
21	MF	(England) Luke Guttridge	31 (1)	13	1	0	0	0	32 (1)	13	7	0
22	MF	(England) Shaun Whalley	8 (8)	1	1	0	5	1	14 (8)	2	1	0
23	MF	(England) Matt Robinson	13 (14)	2	1	0	3	0	17 (14)	2	2	0
24	DF	(England) Alfie Mawson	1	0	0	0	0	0	1	0	0	0
24	MF	(England) Jernade Meade	0	0	0	0	0	0	0	0	0	0
25	DF	(England) Ronnie Henry (captain)	43	0	1	0	0	0	44	0	5	0
26	FW	(England) Paul Benson	36	17	2	1	0	0	38	18	5	0
27	FW	(England) Andre Gray	39 (5)	30	0 (1)	0	0	0	39 (6)	30	4	0
28	MF	(England) Jim Stevenson	3 (2)	0	1	0	0	0	4 (2)	0	0	0
29	MF	(Republic of Ireland) Kane Ferdinand	0 (1)	0	0	0	1	0	1 (1)	0	1	0
29	MF	(Guinea-Bissau) Arnaud Mendy	0	0	0	0	1	0	1	0	0	0
30	DF	(England) Alex Lacey	18 (3)	1	1	0	0	0	19 (3)	1	0	0
31	FW	(England) Jake Woolley	0	0	0	0	0	0	0	0	0	0
32	DF	(England) Brett Longden	0	0	0	0	3	0	3	0	3	0
33	DF	(England) Jerome Jibodu	0	0	0	0	0	0	0	0	0	0
34	FW	(England) Zane Banton	0 (1)	0	0 (1)	0	1 (3)	0	1 (5)	0	0	0
36	MF	(England) Charlie Smith	0	0	0	0	1 (1)	0	1 (1)	0	0	0
38	MF	(England) Arel Amu	0	0	0	0	0	0	0	0	0	0
39	MF	(England) Ian Rees	0	0	0	0	2 (2)	0	2 (2)	0	0	0
40	GK	(England) Ben Barnes	0	0	0	0	0	0	0	0	0	0
41	DF	(England) Tinashe Chabata	0	0	0	0	2	0	2	0	0	0
42	GK	(England) Craig King	0	0	0	0	0	0	0	0	0	0
43^{[B]}	MF	(England) Pelly Ruddock Mpanzu	18 (3)	2	0	0	3	0	21 (3)	2	0	0
44	FW	(England) Andy Mangan	0	0	0	0	0	0	0	0	0	0
46	DF	(England) Luke Trotman	0	0	0	0	1	0	1	0	0	0

== Managerial statistics ==
Only competitive games from the 2013–14 season are included.

Name	Nat.	Record							
Name	Nat.	PLD	W	D	L	GF	GA	GD	W%
John Still	(England)	53	33	13	7	110	40	+70	62.3
Total		53	33	13	7	110	40	+70	62.3

== Transfers ==
=== In ===
Date	Player	From	Fee	Notes
1 July 2013	(Republic of Ireland) Danny Fitzsimons	Histon	Undisclosed^{[A]}	
1 July 2013	(England) Andy Parry	Southport	Undisclosed	
1 July 2013	(England) Jim Stevenson	Histon	Undisclosed^{[A]}	
1 July 2013	(England) Shaun Whalley	Southport	Undisclosed	
5 July 2013	(England) Luke Guttridge	Unattached		
30 September 2013	(Portugal) David Viana	Unattached		
14 January 2014	(England) Fraser Franks	Welling United	Undisclosed	
28 January 2014	(England) Pelly Ruddock Mpanzu	West Ham United	Undisclosed	
21 March 2014	(England) Luke Rooney	Unattached		
15 May 2014	(England) Curtley Williams	Lowestoft Town	Free^{[F]}	

=== Out ===
Date	Player	To	Fee	Notes
1 July 2013	(England) Dan Walker	Hereford United	Free	
4 July 2013	(England) Simon Ainge	Released		
4 July 2013	(England) Danny Spiller	Released		
14 October 2013	(England) Garry Richards	Released		
12 November 2013	(England) Dean Brill	Inverness Caledonian Thistle	Free	
27 December 2013	(Guinea-Bissau) Arnaud Mendy	Released		
1 January 2014	(England) Zak Stephens	Released		
30 January 2014	(England) Scott Rendell	Woking	Free	
29 April 2014	(England) Ben Barnes	Released		
29 April 2014	(England) Tinashe Chabata	Released		
29 April 2014	(England) Jemale McKenzie-Lowe	Released		
7 May 2014	(England) Jerome Jibodu	Released		
7 May 2014	(England) Lathaniel Rowe-Turner	Released		
7 May 2014	(England) Jake Woolley	Released		
27 June 2014	(England) Andre Gray	Brentford	Undisclosed	
30 June 2014	(England) Ronnie Henry	Released		

=== Loans in ===
Date	Player	From	End date	Notes
26 August 2013	(England) Paul Benson	Swindon Town	28 April 2014	
28 November 2013	(England) Joe Davis	Port Vale	4 January 2014	
28 November 2013	(England) Alfie Mawson	Brentford	4 January 2014	
28 November 2013	(England) Pelly Ruddock Mpanzu	West Ham United	30 December 2013	
3 January 2014	(Republic of Ireland) Kane Ferdinand	Peterborough United	28 April 2014	
10 January 2014	(England) Ryan Inniss	Crystal Palace	11 February 2014	
16 January 2014	(Northern Ireland) Cameron McGeehan	Norwich City	28 April 2014	
28 January 2014	(England) Jernade Meade	Swansea City	28 April 2014	
1 April 2014	(England) Andy Mangan	Forest Green Rovers	28 April 2014	

=== Loans out ===
Date	Player	To	End date	Notes
2 July 2013	(England) Dean Brill	Inverness Caledonian Thistle	12 November 2013	
9 August 2013	(England) Zak Stephens	Bedford Town	1 January 2014	
2 September 2013	(England) Lathaniel Rowe-Turner	Alfreton Town	30 January 2014	
6 September 2013	(England) Jerome Jibodu	Boreham Wood	6 December 2013	
6 September 2013	(England) Jake Woolley	Boreham Wood	4 October 2013	
13 September 2013	(England) Scott Rendell	Woking	26 December 2013	
4 October 2013	(England) Brett Longden	Boreham Wood	4 November 2013	
14 October 2013	(England) Jake Woolley	St Neots Town	28 April 2014	
8 November 2013	(England) Brett Longden	St Neots Town	9 December 2013	
18 November 2013	(England) Dave Martin	Dartford	19 January 2014	
28 November 2013	(England) JJ O'Donnell	Hyde	4 January 2014	
28 November 2013	(England) Jim Stevenson	Dartford	28 April 2014	
14 December 2013	(England) Jerome Jibodu	Biggleswade Town	16 January 2014	
18 December 2013	(England) Ben Barnes	Waltham Abbey	28 April 2014	
17 January 2014	(England) JJ O'Donnell	Gateshead	19 May 2014	
17 January 2014	(England) Alex Wall	Dartford	2 April 2014	
18 January 2014	(England) Charlie Smith	Hitchin Town	28 April 2014	
23 January 2014	(England) Shaun Whalley	A.F.C. Telford United	28 April 2014	
31 January 2014	(Nigeria) Solomon Taiwo	Aldershot Town	2 April 2014	
20 February 2014	(England) Jerome Jibodu	Dunstable Town	28 April 2014	
21 February 2014	(England) Jemale McKenzie-Lowe	Hitchin Town	23 March 2014	
5 March 2014	(England) Brett Longden	Maidenhead United	28 April 2014	
6 March 2014	(England) Zane Banton	Concord Rangers	6 April 2014	
6 March 2014	(England) Ian Rees	Concord Rangers	6 April 2014	
21 March 2014	(England) Lathaniel Rowe-Turner	Alfreton Town	28 April 2014	

== Honours ==
=== Team ===
2013–14 Conference Premier Champions

=== Individuals ===
==== Players ====
No.	Name	Award	Month	Source
26	(England) Paul Benson	Conference Premier Player of the Month	December 2013	
27	(England) Andre Gray	Conference Premier Player of the Month	February 2014	
19	(Northern Ireland) Cameron McGeehan	Conference Premier Player of the Month	April 2014	
27	(England) Andre Gray	Conference Premier Golden Boot (30 goals)	April 2014	
5	(England) Steve McNulty	Luton Town Supporters' Club Player of the Year	April 2014	
21	(England) Luke Guttridge	Luton Town Players' Player of the Year	April 2014	
27	(England) Andre Gray	Luton Town Young Player of the Year	April 2014	
5	(England) Steve McNulty	Luton Town Internet Player of the Year^{[C]}	April 2014	
27	(England) Andre Gray	Ian Pearce Memorial Trophy^{[D]}	April 2014	
5	(England) Steve McNulty	Luton Town Goal of the Season^{[E]}	April 2014	

==== Manager ====
Name	Award	Month	Source
(England) John Still	Conference Premier Manager of the Month	December 2013	
(England) John Still	Conference Premier Manager of the Month	February 2014	
(England) John Still	Conference Premier Manager of the Month	April 2014	

== Footnotes ==
A. As Danny Fitzsimons and Jim Stevenson were out of contract but under the age of 24, Histon were entitled to compensation in the form of a development fee from Luton.
B. Pelly Ruddock Mpanzu was assigned squad number 15 during the time he spent on loan at the club in November and December 2013, and took squad number 43 following his permanent transfer in January 2014.
C. The Internet Player of the Season award is voted for by fans of the club through the official website.
D. The Ian Pearce Memorial Trophy, named in honour of BBC Three Counties Radio presenter and Luton Town fan Ian Pearce, who died in March 2011, is presented to the player with the most man-of-the-match awards over the season.
E. The Goal of the Season award was given to Steve McNulty for his 30-yard first-time volley against Southport in the Conference Premier on 26 November 2013.
F. While Curtley Williams was out of contract and over the age of 24, meaning no compensation was required, Luton made the decision to pay Lowestoft Town a small undisclosed fee out of recognition of its role in the player's development.

== See also ==
- 2013–14 in English football
- 2013–14 Football Conference
