= Gabriel Calderón (football manager, born 1986) =

Spanish football manager (born 1986

Personal information
- Full name: Gabriel Calderón Pellegrino
- Date of birth: 30 October 1986 (age 39)
- Place of birth: Seville, Spain

Managerial career
- Years: Team
- 2008–2009: Getafe (youth)
- 2009–2010: Leganés (youth)
- 2021–2023: San Félix (youth)
- 2023–2024: Haiti
- 2026–: Montserrat

Gabriel Calderón Pellegrino (born 30 October 1986) is a Spanish football manager who is currently the manager of the Montserrat national Football team and previously managed the Haiti national football team. He is the son of Argentine former international footballer Gabriel Calderón.
