= Kaleem Simon =

Montserratian footballer (born 1996)

Personal information
- Full name: Kaleem Strawbrige-Simon
- Date of birth: 8 July 1996 (age 30)
- Place of birth: London, England
- Position: Winger

Team information
- Current team: Dubai City
- Number: 33

Youth career
- 2013–2014: UCD

Senior career*
Years	Team	Apps	(Gls)
2014	UCD	3	(0)
2015–2016	Longford Town	54	(3)
2017	Bohemians	15	(0)
2017	Longford Town	5	(0)
2018	Cabinteely	8	(0)
2019	Athlone Town	17	(2)
2019	Warrenpoint Town	0	(0)
2020	Wexford	8	(2)
2020–2021	Welling United	4	(0)
2021	Drogheda United	1	(0)
2022–2023	Fleetwood United		
2023–2024	Arabian Falcons		
2024–2025	Gulf United		
2025–	Dubai City		

International career^{‡}
2021–	Montserrat	18	(3)
- * Club domestic league appearances and goals as of 22 February 2024 ‡ National team caps and goals as of 8 September 2024

Kaleem Strawbrige-Simon (born 8 July 1996) is a professional footballer who plays as a winger for UAE First Division League club Dubai City. Born in England, he plays for the Montserrat national team.

== Club career ==
Simon came through the UCD academy as a student, and made his senior breakthrough as an 18 year old in July 2014. His debut came against Bradford City in a friendly match. He faced competition for places, and after making just three appearances for the club, he joined newly promoted side Longford Town in December 2014. He spent two seasons there, and established himself as a key squad member, making 54 appearances in total and scoring three goals.

Following the club's relegation after the 2016 season, he sealed a move to Bohemians. He spent the first half of the 2017 season in Phibsborough, where he made 15 league appearances, before returning to Longford in July. By December he had played a further five matches

Pat Devlin signed Kaleem for Cabinteely in February 2018, and he made his debut against Wexford on opening day of the First Division season. He never really found his form, and was offloaded once again in 2019. After 17 games with Athlone Town, he joined NIFL Premiership team Warrenpoint Town, where he failed to make a single appearance.

Simon spent the first half of 2020 with Wexford, but during the summer he secured a move across the water to non league outfit Welling United in the UK. He played 4 games for the club before being released a year later. Drogheda United signed him on a free transfer in August 2021, but he only managed a single substitute appearance in 6 months with the County Louth side.

In September 2022, Simon signed for Fleetwood United in the UAE Second Division, the third tier of UAE football. The following season, he dropped down a division to the UAE Third Division League to sign for Arabian Falcons.

== International career ==
Born in England to an English father and Irish mother, Simon became eligible to play for Montserrat through his paternal grandmother. Recruitment team of Montserrat Football Association contacted him in Instagram after noticing his eligibility and enquired if he would be interested in representing them. This led to his inclusion in Montserrat national team for World Cup qualifiers in March 2021.

Simon made his international debut on 24 March 2021 in a 2–2 draw against Antigua and Barbuda. He was also eligible to play for Republic of Ireland or Dominica prior to this match.

== Career statistics ==
=== Club ===
As of 6 January 2023

Appearances and goals by club, season and competition
Club	Season	League			National Cup (Note: Includes FAI Cup, Irish Cup & FA Cup)		League Cup (Note: Includes League of Ireland Cup & Northern Ireland Football League Cup)		Other		Total	
Club	Season	Division	Apps	Goals	Apps	Goals	Apps	Goals	Apps	Goals	Apps	Goals
UCD	2014	League of Ireland Premier Division	3	0	0	0	0	0	0 (Note: Appearances in the Leinster Senior Cup)	0	3	0
Longford Town	2015	League of Ireland Premier Division	25	2	5	0	1	0	1	0	32	2
Longford Town	2016	League of Ireland Premier Division	29	1	2	0	1	0	0	0	32	1
Longford Town	Total		54	3	7	0	2	0	1	0	64	3
Bohemians	2017	League of Ireland Premier Division	15	0	—		0	0	1	0	16	0
Longford Town	2017	League of Ireland First Division	5	0	0	0	—		—		5	0
Cabinteely	2018	League of Ireland First Division	8	0	0	0	0	0	1	0	9	0
Athlone Town	2019	League of Ireland First Division	17	2	0	0	0	0	1	0	18	2
Warrenpoint Town	2019–20	NIFL Premiership	0	0	0	0	0	0	—		0	0
Wexford	2020	League of Ireland First Division	8	2	0	0	1	0	—		9	2
Welling United	2020–21	National League South	4	0	1	0	—		0	0	4	0
Drogheda United	2021	League of Ireland Premier Division	1	0	—		—		—		1	0
Fleetwood United	2022–23	UAE Second Division League					—		—			
Career total			115	7	8	0	3	0	4	0	130	7

=== International ===
As of match played 8 September 2024

Appearances and goals by national team and year
National team	Year	Apps	Goals
Montserrat	2021	5	0
Montserrat	2022	3	1
Montserrat	2023	6	1
Montserrat	2024	4	1
Total		18	3

Scores and results list Montserrat's goal tally first, score column indicates score after each Simon goal.

List of international goals scored by Kaleem Simon
No.	Date	Venue	Opponent	Score	Result	Competition
1	7 June 2022	Félix Sánchez Olympic Stadium, Santo Domingo, Dominican Republic	Haiti	1–2	2–3	2022–23 CONCACAF Nations League B
2	17 November 2023	Blakes Estate Stadium, Lookout, Montserrat	Dominican Republic	2–0	2–1	2023–24 CONCACAF Nations League B
3	9 June 2024	Nicaragua National Football Stadium, Managua, Nicaragua	Panama	1–1	1–3	2026 FIFA World Cup qualification
