= Dean Mason (footballer) =

English-born Montserratian footballer

Personal information
- Full name: Dean Willford Junior Mason
- Date of birth: 28 February 1989 (age 37)
- Place of birth: Islington, England
- Position: Right back

Youth career
- Southampton
- 2006–2007: Barnet

Senior career*
Years	Team	Apps	(Gls)
2007–2008	Barnet	0	(0)
2007–2008	→ Welwyn Garden City (loan)		
2008–2009	AFC Wimbledon	9	(1)
2008–2009	→ Northwood (loan)	3	(0)
2009	Maidenhead United	3	(0)
2009	→ Leyton (loan)	5	(0)
2010–2011	Bishop's Stortford	12	(0)
2010	→ AFC Hayes (loan)		
2011	Chesham United	2	(0)
2011	Haringey Borough	7	(2)
2012	Canvey Island	32	(2)
2012–2013	East Thurrock United	6	(0)
2013	Canvey Island	5	(0)
2013–2014	Wingate & Finchley	29	(2)
2014	Wealdstone	0	(0)
2014	Arlesey Town	18	(3)
2014–2016	Lowestoft Town	37	(2)
2016	Concord Rangers	7	(0)
2016	Cambridge City	11	(1)
2017–2018	Ware	21	(2)
2018	Enfield Town	0	(0)
2019	Maidenhead United	0	(0)
2019	Hayes & Yeading United	1	(0)
2019	London Tigers	3	(0)

International career^{‡}
2012–2024	Montserrat	28	(0)
- * Club domestic league appearances and goals as of 15:45, 13 October 2019 (UTC) ‡ National team caps and goals as of 16:56, 10 September 2024 (UTC)

Dean Willford Junior Mason (born 28 February 1989) is an English-born Montserratian footballer. Primarily a right back, he has also played as a midfielder. Mason is a Montserrat international.

== Club career ==
Mason started his career with a short spell with Southampton's Academy. He then joined Barnet's youth side, and was signed up with the first team squad. After spending two years with Barnet, he signed for AFC Wimbledon where he helped them gain promotion and win the Conference South championship. He scored his debut league goal in his third appearance as a substitute on 16 August 2008 in a 3–1 home victory over Bognor Regis Town. In December 2008 he was loaned to Northwood. After promotion he was later released and joined Maidenhead United. This was short lived due to lack of playing time and he later joined Bishops Stortford.

He signed for Chesham United on 10 August 2011 making 2 appearances, before signing for Haringey Borough on 20 September 2011 making 10 appearances and scoring 2. He left Haringey Borough by mutual consent and signed for Isthmian League club Canvey Island on 23 January 2012, With Canvey Island he won the Essex Senior Cup, beating Dagenham & Redbridge on penalties in the semi-final and Colchester United 1–0 in the final. Canvey Island won the trophy without conceding a goal throughout the competition.

In January 2013 he was on trial with Belgium side Union St. Gilloise but failed to agree terms. In June 2013 he joined Wingate & Finchley and made his debut on 10 August 2013 in a 4–0 victory over Carshalton Athletic. On 26 October 2013, Mason opened his goalscoring account for Wingate & Finchley when he struck the opening goal in a 3–0 home victory over Bognor Regis Town. Mason made his final appearance for the club in a 1–0 home defeat to Leiston on 18 January 2014.

In July 2014 he joined Arlesey Town and scored on his league debut on 9 August 2014 in a 1–0 victory over Dorchester Town. Mason left Arlesey Town in December 2014 and joined Conference North side Lowestoft Town, where he spent two seasons. In the 2016–17 season Mason briefly joined Concord Rangers before joining Cambridge City. He then signed for Ware for the rest of the season, and stayed on into the following season. Mason played in an Alan Turvey Trophy game for Enfield Town in August 2018. In February 2019 Mason started a Berks & Bucks Senior Cup game for Maidenhead against Aylesbury United. Four days later he was an unused substitute for their National League win over Leyton Orient. Mason joined Hayes & Yeading United at the start of the 2019–20 season, later moving on to Spartan South Midlands League team London Tigers.

== International career ==
Mason was called up to the Montserrat national team in August 2012, for the 2012 Caribbean Championship First Round qualifiers, held in Martinique. Despite not qualifying past the group stages, he helped Montserrat achieve their first victory since 1995 and their first ever victory since joining FIFA, beating the British Virgin Islands 7–0.

In May 2014, he was called up by Montserrat to face US Virgin Islands and Bonaire in the preliminary round of the 2014 Caribbean Cup qualification phase. He returned to the national team in September 2018 for 2019–20 CONCACAF Nations League qualifying.

Mason won his 13th cap against Dominican Republic in October 2019, which saw him become Montserrat's most-capped player at that date.
