= Alex Lawless =

Welsh association football player (born 1985)

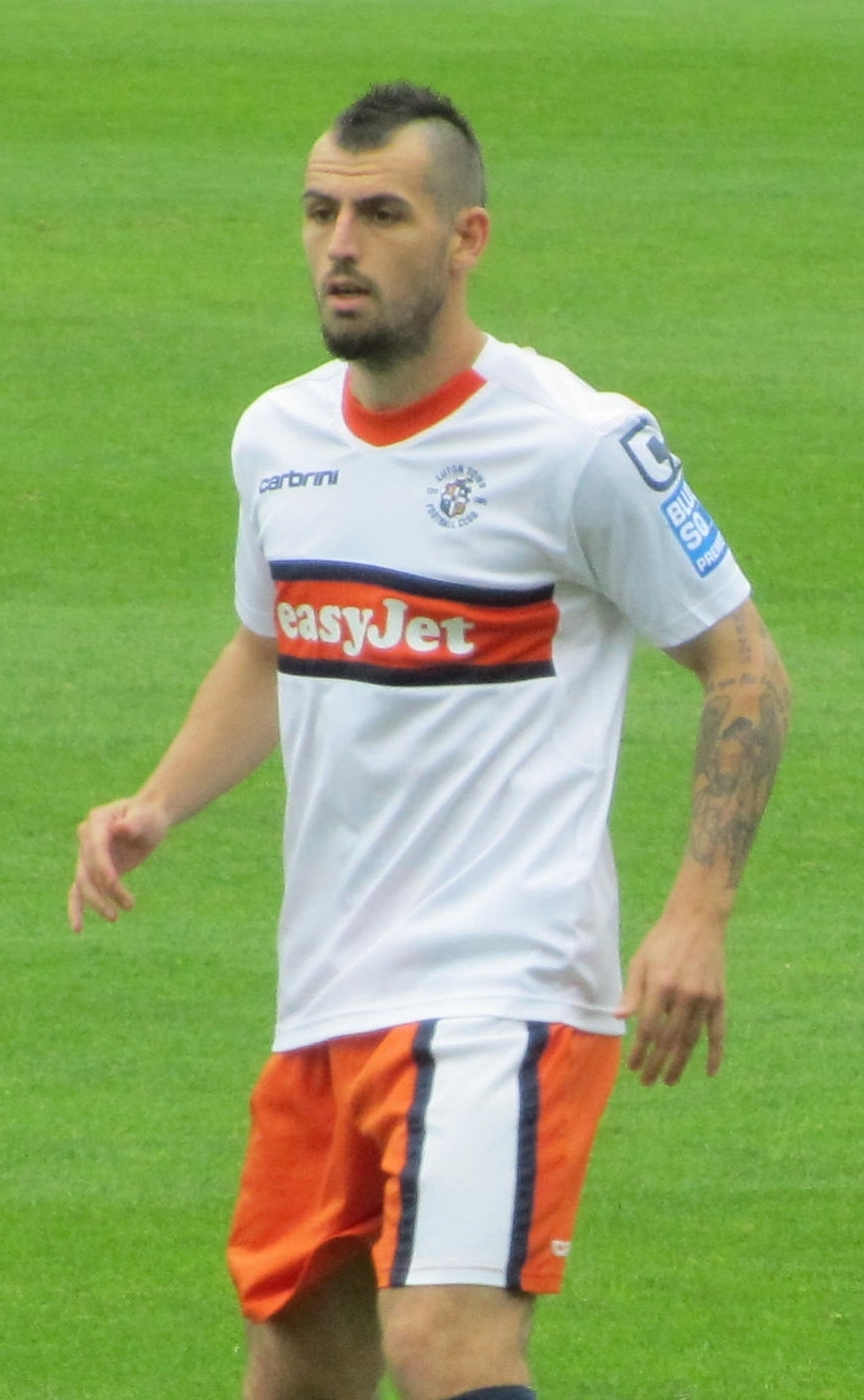
- Lawless playing for Luton Town in 2011

Personal information
- Full name: Alexander Graham Lawless
- Date of birth: 26 March 1985 (age 41)
- Place of birth: Tonypandy, Wales
- Height: 5 ft 11 in (1.80 m)
- Positions: Right-back; midfielder

Team information
- Current team: Luton Town (caretaker manager)

Youth career
- –2002: Cardiff City

Senior career*
Years	Team	Apps	(Gls)
2002–2003	Ton Pentre	33	(10)
2003–2005	Fulham	0	(0)
2005–2006	Torquay United	14	(0)
2006–2009	Forest Green Rovers	102	(8)
2009–2011	York City	51	(4)
2010–2011	→ Luton Town (loan)	5	(1)
2011–2016	Luton Town	164	(17)
2016–2017	Yeovil Town	33	(1)
2017–2019	Leyton Orient	44	(0)
2019–2020	Ebbsfleet United	11	(0)
Total		457	(41)

International career
2003	Wales U19	1	(0)
2006	Wales U21	1	(0)
2007–2008	Wales semi-pro	2	(1)

Managerial career
- 2025: Luton Town (caretaker)
- * Club domestic league appearances and goals

Alexander Graham Lawless (born 26 March 1985) is a Welsh former professional footballer currently Under-21s Head Coach at Luton Town. A right-back or midfielder by trade, he played in the English Football League for Torquay United, Luton Town and Yeovil Town.

Lawless began his career with Cardiff City's youth system before playing for Welsh Football League club Ton Pentre. He joined Premier League club Fulham in 2003 and he was released in 2005. He spent a season in League Two with Torquay United, before joining Forest Green Rovers in the Conference National. He spent three seasons with them, winning the club's players' player of the season award in the 2007–08 season and playing in the Final of the Conference League Cup. He joined York City in 2009 and played for them in the 2010 Conference Premier play-off final at Wembley Stadium. He then signed for Luton Town, initially on loan, in 2010. After taking part in two unsuccessful play-off campaigns with the club, Lawless was part of the Luton team that won the Conference Premier title and promotion to League Two in the 2013–14 season.

He has represented Wales at various levels. He earned two caps for the under-19 team, before making one appearance for the under-21 team in 2006. He has made two appearances for the semi-pro team, making his debut against Italy in 2007 and scoring against England C in a 2–1 defeat in 2008.

He retired from playing to undertake a full time coaching role with Leyton Orient FC’s under 18’s. After spending two seasons working alongside Brian Saah, Lawless took up a role of under 18’s and under 21’s assistant coach at Luton Town FC. He then became the under 18s head coach in the summer of 2023 replacing Alan McCormack who was promoted to the first team. After one season as under 18’s head coach he then took on the role as under 21s head coach.

== Club career ==
=== Early career ===
Born in Tonypandy, Mid Glamorgan, Lawless was educated at Tonypandy Comprehensive School and began his career with the youth system of Cardiff City. After being released by Cardiff, he stayed at school and studied for his A-levels. He later played for Welsh Football League Division One club Ton Pentre, making 33 league appearances and scoring 10 goals in the 2002–03 season; this included two goals in a 9–0 victory over Milford in December 2002. Following a six-week trial, he signed professional terms with Premier League club Fulham on 21 August 2003.

=== Torquay United ===
He was released by Fulham in May 2005, and he was offered a trial with League Two club Torquay United in July. Lawless signed for the club on a free transfer and manager Leroy Rosenior said "It's important that the supporters are patient with these youngsters and give them time to learn and develop". He made his debut on 6 August 2005 in a 0–0 draw at home to Notts County, although he only lasted 26 minutes before being replaced by Tony Bedeau. His return from an injury after nearly a month out came in a 2–1 victory over Shrewsbury Town in September, which was Torquay's first win of the season. He picked up another injury in November 2005, and made his return after three months of not playing by starting in a 1–0 victory over Bristol Rovers on 17 December 2005. He scored an own goal after 86 minutes against Wycombe Wanderers on 26 December 2005, which resulted in Torquay drawing 2–2. His final appearance of the 2005–06 season came in a 2–0 defeat to Lincoln City in February 2006. He was released by Torquay after making 16 appearances.

=== Forest Green Rovers ===
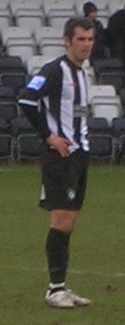
Lawless playing for Forest Green Rovers in 2009

Lawless joined Conference National club Forest Green Rovers on non-contract terms on 4 August 2006. He made his debut in a 1–0 defeat to Dagenham & Redbridge on 12 August 2006. Lawless scored his first goal for the club with a "spectacular" strike from long-range to give Forest Green the lead against Morecambe on 24 February 2007, but they went on to lose 3–1. He finished the 2006–07 season with 40 appearances and one goal. He scored the only goal for Forest Green in their 1–0 victory over Crawley Town on 10 February 2008 in the 73rd minute. After playing for the Welsh semi-pro team, manager Jim Harvey was worried over Lawless' fitness, although he was able to play in Forest Green's following game against Cambridge United. Lawless made 41 appearances and scored three goals for Forest Green as they earned their highest ever finish of eighth in the Conference Premier in the 2007–08 season. He won the Player of the Season award, being described as the team's unsung hero.

On the opening day of the 2008–09 season, he filled in at right-back due to an injury to Kris Thomas and scored with a 20-yard shot to give Forest Green a 1–1 draw against Kettering Town. He garnered praise from Harvey, who said Lawless had a "super game". A hip injury forced him to miss a game against Northwich Victoria in September 2008, before making his return later that month in a 3–0 defeat to Stevenage Borough. During a game against former club Torquay on 23 September 2008, he suffered an ankle injury which forced him to miss three games. He made his return in a 2–2 draw with Cambridge United on 16 October 2008. He then picked up a hamstring injury and in his return scored with a "fierce" long-range strike to give Forest Green a 1–0 victory over Mansfield Town on 22 November 2008. Following this game, his hamstring tightened and was ruled out for a month due to a back injury. After making good progress with the injury he returned in a 1–1 draw with Kidderminster Harriers on 26 December 2008.

Lawless scored against Championship team Derby County with a "superb finish past Carroll from a tight angle" after evading the opponent defence in an FA Cup third round tie on 3 January 2009, which put Forest Green 2–0 up, although they went on to lose 4–3. He missed Forest Green's FA Trophy tie against Redditch United because of a hamstring injury, as well as the semi-final of the Conference League Cup against Woking. He made his return in a 2–1 defeat to Eastbourne Borough on 17 January 2009 and was substituted in the 64th minute as a precaution. After missing the match against Histon because of a one-match suspension, Lawless contributed with an assist and a goal on his return against Northwich on 18 February 2009, after heading from a corner kick for John Hardiker to score and himself finishing with a goal from close range. He was forced to miss games against Cambridge United and Kidderminster in April 2009 due to a stomach illness, and he made his return in the 2009 Conference League Cup Final, which was lost 3–0 to A.F.C. Telford United on a penalty shoot-out, after a 0–0 extra time draw. His season ended prematurely after he suffered a broken leg against York City following a heavy challenge on 21 April 2009, with an X-ray confirming his fibula endured a hairline fracture. He completed the season with 39 appearances and six goals and Harvey hoped his budget would allow for Lawless to stay at the club.

=== York City ===
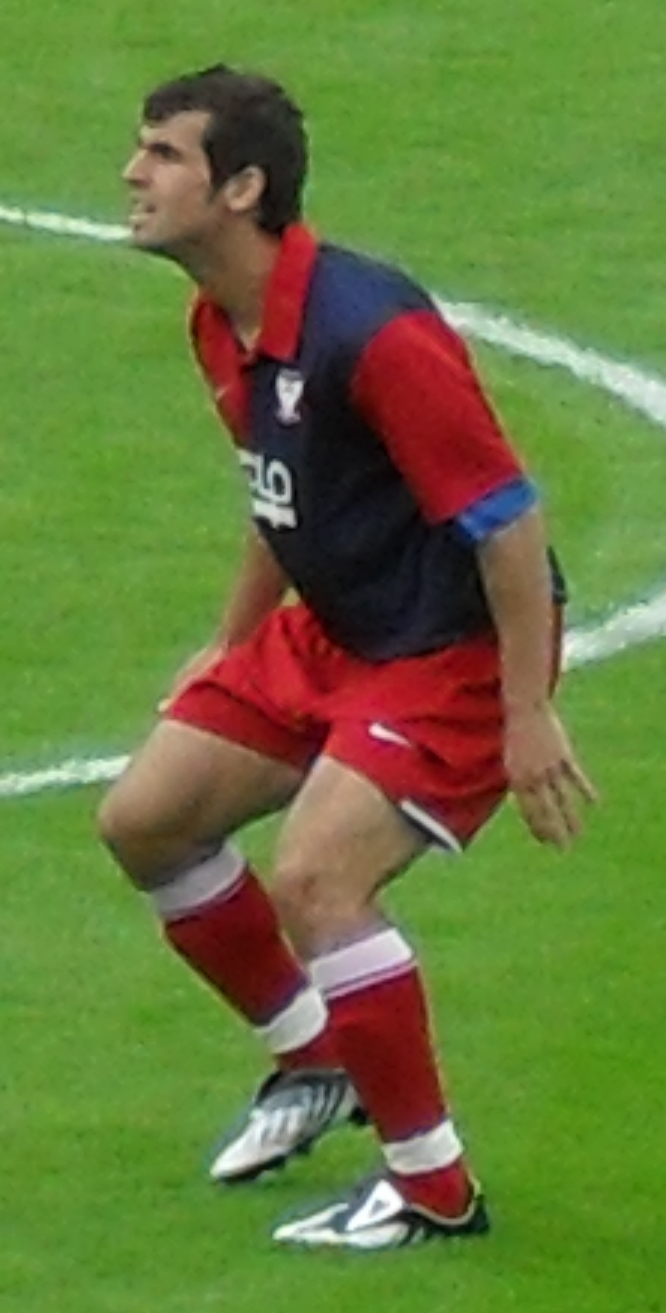
Lawless playing for York City in 2009

Lawless signed for Forest Green's Conference Premier rivals York City on a one-year contract on 17 June 2009, despite there being two Football League clubs looking to sign him. He made his debut in a 2–1 defeat to Oxford United on 8 August 2009. After suffering from a virus he was forced to miss a game against Cambridge United in September 2009, and he recovered ahead of York's game against Kidderminster. He scored his first goal for York with the only goal in a 1–0 victory over Gateshead on 24 November 2009. He pulled his hamstring in a 1–0 defeat to Eastbourne on 27 February 2010 and made his return as a 64th-minute substitute in a 4–0 victory at Grays Athletic on 30 March. He played in both legs of York's play-off semi-final victory over Luton Town, which finished 2–0 on aggregate. He started in the 2010 Conference Premier play-off final at Wembley Stadium on 16 May, which York lost 3–1 to Oxford. He finished the season with 45 appearances and one goal for York.

Lawless made his first appearance of the 2010–11 season in the opening game, a 2–1 defeat to Kidderminster on 14 August 2010. He scored his first goal of the season with York's second in a 3–1 victory at Tamworth on 25 September 2010.

=== Luton Town ===
On 8 November 2010, Lawless joined York's Conference Premier rivals Luton Town, initially on loan, with a permanent transfer due to take place in January 2011. York were reluctant to let him leave, but relented when Luton increased their original offer on three occasions. He made his debut in a 1–0 defeat at Wrexham on 11 November 2010 and, in the following game, Lawless scored his first Luton goal with the winner in a 1–0 victory at Altrincham. Lawless signed for Luton permanently for an undisclosed fee on a one-and-a-half-year contract on 5 January 2011. His first appearance after signing was as a 74th-minute substitute in a 0–0 draw at Bath City on 8 January 2011. After the departure of fellow midfielder Andy Drury to Ipswich Town in late January 2011, Lawless played a much more prominent role in a Luton team that eventually finished the 2010–11 season third in the table. He scored the opening goal, a 35-yard strike described as "superb", in Luton's 3–0 play-off semi-final first leg victory away at Wrexham. He then played in the 2–1 home victory in the second leg, and in the 2011 Conference Premier play-off final against AFC Wimbledon at Wembley he missed the opening penalty kick in the penalty shoot-out, which Luton lost 4–3.

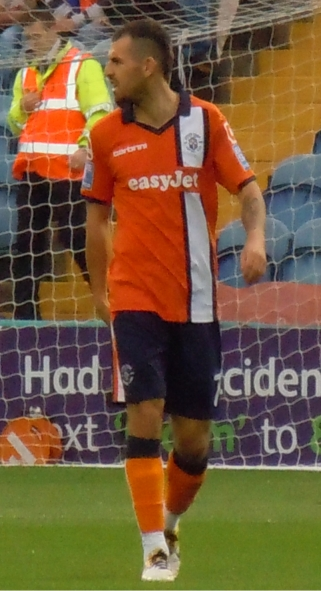
Lawless playing for Luton Town in 2011

During the half-time break of Luton's 3–0 defeat away at his former club York on 24 September 2011, Lawless broke his hand after punching a wall out of frustration, resulting in him being ruled out for around a month and being handed a fine by his club. He played in Luton's 2012 Conference Premier play-off final 2–1 defeat at Wembley, coincidentally against York, on 20 May 2012. Lawless signed a one-year contract extension in July 2012, despite poor performances during the 2011–12 season making him a target for fans.

Manager Paul Buckle praised Lawless for his "quality ... hard work and ... discipline" following his 100th appearance for the club in December 2012. He scored the winning goal with a volley into the bottom corner in Luton's 1–0 victory over Championship team Wolverhampton Wanderers in the FA Cup third round on 5 January 2013, and was voted as the competition's Player of the Round. Lawless finished the season with 48 appearances and five goals. His performances saw him voted by both Luton supporters and his teammates as the club's Player of the Season for the 2012–13 season; a marked turnaround from the previous year. He signed a new two-year contract with Luton in May 2013 after having talks with two unnamed League One clubs.

Lawless was sidelined with a groin injury at the beginning of the 2013–14 season, and did not make his first start until 17 September in a 3–0 victory against Dartford, in which he scored one goal and set up another. This victory provided the springboard for Luton to embark on a 27-game unbeaten run in the league, in which Lawless was heavily involved, scoring five further times and contributing 10 assists. After playing in 32 games and scoring six goals, including many games in an unfamiliar position as a left midfielder, he missed the final part of the season due to injury. On 15 April 2014, with three games to spare, Luton won the Conference Premier title and were promoted to League Two; this was Lawless' first title and promotion as a player.

Lawless struggled with multiple injuries during the 2014–15 season, making 15 league appearances (only six of which were starts) and scoring three goals. Despite this limited playing time, Lawless triggered a contract extension during the season to keep him at the club until the end of the 2015–16 season.

On 10 May 2016, it was announced that Lawless would not have his contract renewed after making 203 appearances and scoring 22 goals for Luton since joining the club in 2010. He left the club upon the expiry of his contract.

=== Later career ===
On 29 July 2016, Lawless signed for League Two club Yeovil Town on a one-year contract. At the end of the 2016–17 season, Lawless was released by Yeovil along with five other players.

On 11 July 2017, Lawless signed a two-year contract with newly relegated National League club Leyton Orient. He was released at the end of the 2018–19 season.

Lawless signed for National League club Ebbsfleet United on 27 June 2019.

== International career ==
Lawless was capped once for the Wales national under-19 team on 24 September 2003, entering a 2–1 home win over Greece in the 2004 UEFA European Under-19 Championship first qualifying round. He made his only under-21 appearance in a 1–0 defeat against Northern Ireland on 28 February 2006, eventually being substituted for Marc Williams on 84 minutes. He made his debut for the Wales semi-pro team in their 4–2 defeat to Italy on 14 November 2007. He was part of the semi-pro team to play against England C in February 2008, and he scored in their 2–1 defeat with a shot from 20 yards. He was named in the team to play Finland in November, although he was forced to miss the game because of an injury.

== Style of play ==
Lawless is able to play as a right or left midfielder, a central midfielder and a right back. While being equally comfortable playing at any of these positions, he prefers to play in a midfield role. He has also played in the hole and has given a composed performance as a second striker. His play as a right midfielder is "skilful" and he has been described as being "comfortable on the ball, a good passer, mobile and with an eye for goal". Stevenage Borough manager Graham Westley described him as a player "who impresses me with his consistency". After signing for York, manager Martin Foyle said "He is a great all-rounder, a technically good footballer and has a very professional attitude towards the game." His partnership with Neil Barrett in the central midfield for York drew praise from teammate Richard Brodie, who said "The midfield two worked really well together and picked up the second balls. Alex Lawless was flawless and he should be playing in the Football League".

== Personal life ==
After joining York City in 2009, Lawless moved into a house with teammates Neil Barrett, James Meredith, Richard Pacquette and Daniel Parslow. He has an interest in art, which he studied as a GCSE, saying "I wouldn't mind trying to make a living from it one day but my main priority is football". He is a Manchester United supporter and attention to his interest in art was first drawn after producing a painting of manager Alex Ferguson.

== Career statistics ==
Appearances and goals by club, season and competition
Club	Season	League			National Cup (Note: Includes FA Cup)		League Cup (Note: Includes EFL Cup)		Other		Total	
Club	Season	Division	Apps	Goals	Apps	Goals	Apps	Goals	Apps	Goals	Apps	Goals
Ton Pentre	2002–03	Welsh Football League Division One	33	10							33	10
Torquay United	2005–06	League Two	14	0	2	0	0	0	0	0	16	0
Forest Green Rovers	2006–07	Conference National	38	1	1	0	—		1 (Note: Appearance(s) in FA Trophy)	0	40	1
Forest Green Rovers	2007–08	Conference Premier	32	2	5	0	—		4 (Note: Two appearances and one goal in FA Trophy, two appearances in Conference League Cup)	1	41	3
Forest Green Rovers	2008–09	Conference Premier	32	5	3	1	—		4 (Note: Two appearances in FA Trophy, two in Conference League Cup)	0	39	6
Forest Green Rovers	Total		102	8	9	1	—		9	1	120	10
York City	2009–10	Conference Premier	35	1	4	0	—		6 (Note: Three appearances in FA Trophy, three in Conference Premier play-offs)	0	45	1
York City	2010–11	Conference Premier	16	3	2	0	—		—		18	3
York City	Total		51	4	6	0	—		6	0	63	4
Luton Town	2010–11	Conference Premier	20	3	—		—		9 (Note: Six appearances and one goal in FA Trophy, three appearances and one goal in Conference Premier play-offs)	2	29	5
Luton Town	2011–12	Conference Premier	38	2	2	0	—		7 (Note: Four appearances in FA Trophy, three in Conference Premier play-offs)	0	47	2
Luton Town	2012–13	Conference Premier	37	3	6	2	—		5	0	48	5
Luton Town	2013–14	Conference Premier	31	6	1	0	—		0	0	32	6
Luton Town	2014–15	League Two	15	3	0	0	0	0	1 (Note: Appearance in Football League Trophy)	0	16	3
Luton Town	2015–16	League Two	28	1	2	0	0	0	1	0	31	1
Luton Town	Total		169	18	11	2	0	0	23	2	203	22
Yeovil Town	2016–17	League Two	33	1	0	0	2	0	4 (Note: Appearances in EFL Trophy)	0	39	1
Leyton Orient	2017–18	National League	26	0	2	0	—		2	0	30	0
Leyton Orient	2018–19	National League	18	0	1	0	—		3	0	22	0
Leyton Orient	Total		44	0	3	0	—		5	0	52	0
Ebbsfleet United	2019–20	National League	11	0	3	0	—		0	0	14	0
Career total			457	41	34	3	2	0	47	3	540	47

== Honours ==
Luton Town

- Conference Premier: 2013–14

Leyton Orient

- National League: 2018–19

Individual

- Luton Town Player of the Season: 2012–13
