= Montserrat national football team =

Montserrat
- Nickname: Emerald Boys
- Association: Montserrat Football Association (MFA)
- Confederation: CONCACAF (North America)
- Sub-confederation: CFU (Caribbean)
- Head coach: Gabriel Calderón
- Captain: Lyle Taylor
- Most caps: Alex Dyer (42)
- Top scorer: Lyle Taylor (17)
- Home stadium: Blakes Estate Stadium
- FIFA code: MSR
First colours	Second colours

FIFA ranking
- Current: 175 ▼3 (18 November 2026)
- Highest: 165 (August 2014)
- Lowest: 206 (January 2011 – January 2012, June 2012, August – September 2012)

First international
- Saint Lucia 3–0 Montserrat (Saint Lucia; 10 May 1991)

Biggest win
- British Virgin Islands 0–7 Montserrat (Fort-de-France, Martinique; 9 September 2012)

Biggest defeat
- Bermuda 13–0 Montserrat (Hamilton, Bermuda; 29 February 2004)

The Montserrat national football team represents Montserrat, a British overseas territory in men's international football, and is governed by the Montserrat Football Association, the governing body for football in Montserrat founded in 1994. It has been a full member of FIFA and CONCACAF since 1996, and is also a member of CFU in the Caribbean Zone.

Montserrat has never qualified for the FIFA World Cup and CONCACAF Gold Cup, but has participated four times in League B and once in League C of the CONCACAF Nations League.

Montserrat's debut in international competitions was in the 1991 Caribbean Cup qualifying tournament, and the team's first appearance in World Cup qualifiers was for 2002 qualification. The first victory in the team's history was in 1995 by defeating Anguilla 3–2 in the 1995 Caribbean Cup qualifying tournament.

== History ==
The Montserrat national team is one of the newest in international football, having played its first senior match on 10 May 1991, during the 1991 Caribbean Cup tournament. The team suffered a 3–0 defeat against Saint Lucia. The team's next match was against Anguilla; securing a 1–1 draw. Montserrat once again entered the Caribbean Cup the following year, but were once more knocked out in the group stage, with heavy defeats against Saint Kitts and Nevis and Antigua and Barbuda. They were drawn against the same two teams in the 1994 Caribbean Cup, again being eliminated in the tournament's group stage, conceding 17 goals in two matches. In 1994, the Montserrat Football Association (MFA) was formed. Like all other football teams based in the Caribbean, the MFA became a member of CONCACAF.

On 26 March 1995, Montserrat played their first ever home international match. They defeated Anguilla 3–2, thus achieving their first win. The team beat Anguilla again in the next fixture, to ensure progression to the Second Qualifying Round of the 1995 Caribbean Cup. The 1–0 win in the second leg, was their only clean sheet in international football, and their most recent victory for the next seventeen years. The side exited the competition in the next stage, losing 20–0 against Saint Vincent and the Grenadines.

Soon afterwards, the Soufrière Hills volcano became active and the eruptions destroyed Plymouth, the capital of Montserrat, severely disrupting life on the island. Despite the lack of football action, the MFA became a member of FIFA in 1996. However, it was a further three years before the Montserrat team played another match. This was mostly because many of the island's footballers had emigrated from the area, many of them to England.

After a four-year hiatus, the team entered the 1999 Caribbean Nations Cup. They were knocked out in the preliminary round of the tournament, losing 6–1 to the British Virgin Islands. Due to the volcanic activity on the island, Montserrat had been unable to enter the 1998 FIFA World Cup, so their entry to the 2002 FIFA World Cup was their first; but it was not a success as they were defeated 6–1 by the Dominican Republic. In 2001, the MFA visited The Football Association to raise money for a new stadium. Shortly after this the Blakes Estate Stadium was opened. The team's next match was on 30 June 2002, the day of the 2002 FIFA World Cup final, when Montserrat played Bhutan in a game known as "The Other Final". The friendly match between the two lowest-ranked teams in the world ended with a 4–0 win for Bhutan in front of 15,000 fans in Thimphu.

Montserrat entered the World Cup qualifiers once more for the 2006 competition, but again lost in the first qualifying round, this time losing 20–0 against Bermuda. Montserrat then competed in the 2005 Caribbean Cup, but once more failed to progress past the preliminary round. In 2008, they were defeated 7–1 by Suriname in the first qualifying round of the 2010 World Cup.

The team played a friendly match against a Network Rail XI on May 19, 2012, ending in a 4–4 draw.

Montserrat achieved their first victory since 1995 and their first ever victory since joining FIFA, beating the British Virgin Islands 7–0 in a 2012 Caribbean Championship qualifying match.

Montserrat's fortunes changed dramatically in 2018 with the arrival of Willie Donachie and the launch of the CONCACAF Nations League. The side won three of their four qualifying games, but missed out on qualification for the 2019 CONCACAF Gold Cup on goal difference. The team went on to take second place in their group in the inaugural season with two wins, draws, and losses each, thus keeping their place in the second tier.

Following Willie Donachie, in 2022 Matt Lockwood took over for a spell as head coach and technical director, supported in March 2023 by assistant coaches Craig Easton and David Preece. Just months later on September 8, Lee Bowyer took over as the Montserrat manager and Steve Gallen is the assistant. In their first game they beat Barbados with a 99th-minute winner to go second in their CONCACAF Nations League group.

A campaign was started by The Sweeper, a podcast on world football, to bring together the least-populated FIFA member Montserrat with India, the most-populated FIFA member for a friendly match. Montserrat governor Harriet Cross has endorsed the campaign.

== World rankings ==
Due to the team's poor results, they have often been at the lower end of the FIFA World Rankings. The loss to Bhutan in "The Other Final" saw them fall to 203rd in the rankings, becoming the worst-ranked side in the world. After the addition of another two teams to FIFA, Montserrat achieved a new low of 205th between July and October 2004. In July 2006, they achieved a record high rank of 196th, but then fell to 198th the following month. Success in the qualifying tournament for the CONCACAF Nations League and the first edition of the league proper saw them rise to 184th.

The team have also languished in the lower reaches of the unofficial World Football Elo Ratings, which ranks teams directly based on their match results.

== Colours ==
Since the team's first match in 1991, Montserrat have usually worn a first-choice kit of green, either plain green or green and white hoops. Currently, the away kit is a red jersey, shorts and socks.

== Results and fixtures ==
The following is a list of match results in the last 12 months, as well as any future matches that have been scheduled.

Win Draw Loss Fixture

=== 2026-27 ===
23 September 2026 2026–27 CONCACAF Nations League C	Turks and Caicos Islands	0–2	Montserrat	TCIFA National Academy, Providenciales
15:00		Report	Boatswain 41', 69'	Referee: Jordan Chaibriant (Guadeloupe)

26 September 2026 2026–27 CONCACAF Nations League C	Montserrat	3–0	British Virgin Islands	TCIFA National Academy, Providenciales
15:00	Barzey 58'; Taylor 67', 71'	Report		Referee: Evens Julmis (Bahamas)

13 November 2026 2026–27 Nations League A/C Play-In	Montserrat	1–2	Nicaragua	Santiago, Dominican Republic
20:00 UTC−4	Boatswain 35'	Report	Fenton 59' (o.g.); Mejía 72'	Stadium: Estadio Cibao FC; Referee: Adonai Escobedo González (Mexico)

17 November 2026 2026–27 Nations League A/C Play-In	Nicaragua	2–0	Montserrat	Managua, Nicaragua
21:00 UTC−6	Talavera 51'; Salinas 80'	Report		Stadium: Estadio Nacional; Referee: Nelson Salgado (Honduras)

March 2027 2026–27 Nations League C Semi-final	Montserrat	v	Aruba

== Coaching staff ==
Position	Name	Notes
Manager	(Spain) Gabriel Calderón	
Assistant Manager	(Montserrat) James Comley	
Goalkeeping Coach	(Trinidad and Tobago) Rayshawn Mars	
Head Physiotherapist	(Montserrat) Robinson Plymouth	

=== Coaching history ===
- (England) Paul Morris (2000–2002)
- (Antigua and Barbuda) William Lewis (2002–2004)
- (England) Scott Cooper (2004)
- (Montserrat) Ruel Fox (2004)
- (Montserrat) Cecil Lake (2008)
- (Montserrat) Kenny Dyer (2008–2013)
- (Antigua and Barbuda) Lenny Hewlett (2013–2015)
- (Scotland) Willie Donachie (2018–2022)
- (England) Matt Lockwood (2023)
- (England) Lee Bowyer (2023–2025)
- (Trinidad and Tobago) Angus Eve (2025–2026)
- (Spain) Gabriel Calderón (2026–present)

== Players ==
=== Current squad ===
The following players were called up to the squad for the 2026–27 CONCACAF Nations League Play-in matches against Nicaragua on 13 and 17 November 2026.

Caps and goals correct as of 17 November 2026, after the game against Nicaragua.

No.	Pos.	Player	Date of birth (age)	Caps	Goals	Club
1	GK	Trent Carter-Rogers	23 April 2006 (age 20)	14	0	(The Football Association) Harrow Borough
23	GK	Kymani Nelson	4 March 2004 (age 22)	6	0	Free agent
13	GK	Ervin Liburd	28 July 2003 (age 23)	0	0	(The Football Association) Cheshunt
4	GK	Josiah Persaud	24 December 2003 (age 22)	0	0	(The Football Association) Hinton
16	DF	Jernade Meade	15 October 1992 (age 34)	21	0	(The Football Association) Royston Town
20	DF	Lucas Kirnon	25 October 2003 (age 23)	20	0	(Canadian Soccer Association) Kamloops United
3	DF	Lenni Cirino	25 January 2003 (age 23)	10	0	(The Football Association) Hednesford Town
6	DF	Mackye Townsend-West	1 August 2003 (age 23)	10	0	(The Football Association) Enfield Town
19	DF	Vashirn Roache	7 July 2005 (age 21)	5	0	(The Football Association) Anstey Town
5	DF	Darion Furlong	27 February 2000 (age 26)	4	0	(The Football Association) St Albans City
2	DF	Raff Cirino	3 February 2007 (age 19)	4	0	(The Football Association) Fleetwood Town
14	DF	Sam Fenton	16 February 2004 (age 22)	2	0	(United States Soccer Federation) Dartmouth Big Green
18	MF	Alex Dyer (captain)	11 June 1990 (age 36)	42	0	(The Football Association) St Albans City
8	MF	Brandon Comley	18 November 1995 (age 31)	29	0	(The Football Association) Barnet
10	MF	Kaleem Simon	8 July 1996 (age 30)	20	3	(United Arab Emirates Football Association) Dubai City
21	MF	Tyrone Baker	28 April 2001 (age 25)	6	1	(The Football Association) Bishop's Stortford
15	MF	Princewill Madu	9 December 2004 (age 21)	1	0	(The Football Association) Barton Rovers
7	FW	Brandon Barzey	27 July 1999 (age 27)	23	6	(The Football Association) Hanworth Villa
12	FW	Dominic Richmond	18 March 2006 (age 20)	17	1	(The Football Association) Squires Gate
17	FW	Ashley Boatswain	19 April 2005 (age 21)	14	5	(The Football Association) Gateshead
9	FW	Josiah Dyer	24 September 2004 (age 22)	11	1	(The Football Association) Stocksbridge Park Steels
11	FW	Seigel Rodney	2 October 2003 (age 23)	10	0	(German Football Association) TuS Esens
22	FW	Kymani Smith-Daley	20 June 2008 (age 18)	2	0	(The Football Association) Watford

=== Recent call-ups ===
The following players have been called up to the Montserrat squad in the last 12 months.

Pos.	Player	Date of birth (age)	Caps	Goals	Club	Latest call-up
DF	Nico Gordon	28 April 2002 (age 24)	17	0	(United States) Monterey Bay	v. Turks and Caicos Islands, 6 October 2026
DF	Jeriel Dorsett	4 May 2002 (age 24)	11	0	(England) Reading	v. Turks and Caicos Islands, 6 October 2026
MF	Mylan Benjamin	21 September 2004 (age 22)	11	0	Free agent	v. Turks and Caicos Islands, 6 October 2026
MF	Mark Rogers	6 May 2002 (age 24)	2	1	(United States) New York Bravehearts	v. Turks and Caicos Islands, 6 October 2026
MF	Sydney Mendes	2 July 2003 (age 23)	2	0	(England) Brimsdown	v. Turks and Caicos Islands, 6 October 2026
FW	Lyle Taylor	29 March 1990 (age 36)	24	17	(England) Chelmsford City	v. Turks and Caicos Islands, 6 October 2026

== Player records ==
As of 17 November 2026
Players in bold are still active with Montserrat.

=== Most appearances ===
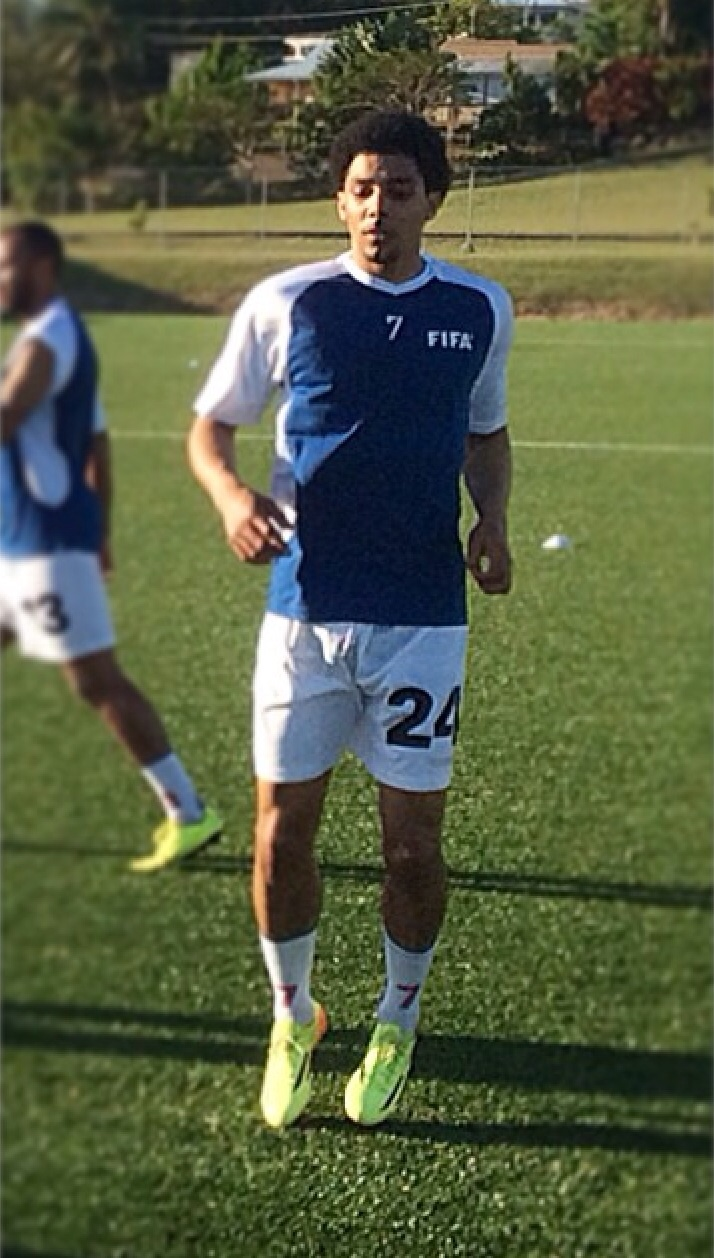
Dean Mason is one of Montserrat's most capped players

Rank	Player	Caps	Goals	Career
1	**Alex Dyer**	42	0	2011–present
2	Craig Braham-Barrett	29	0	2018–2024
2	**Brandon Comley**	29	0	2018–present
4	Dean Mason	28	0	2012–2024
5	James Comley	25	1	2015–2025
6	**Lyle Taylor**	24	17	2015–present
7	Adrian Clifton	23	6	2015–2023
7	Joey Taylor	23	1	2018–2024
7	Corrin Brooks-Meade	23	0	2015–2024
7	**Brandon Barzey**	23	6	2022–present
10	**Jernade Meade**	21	0	2021–present

=== Top goalscorers ===
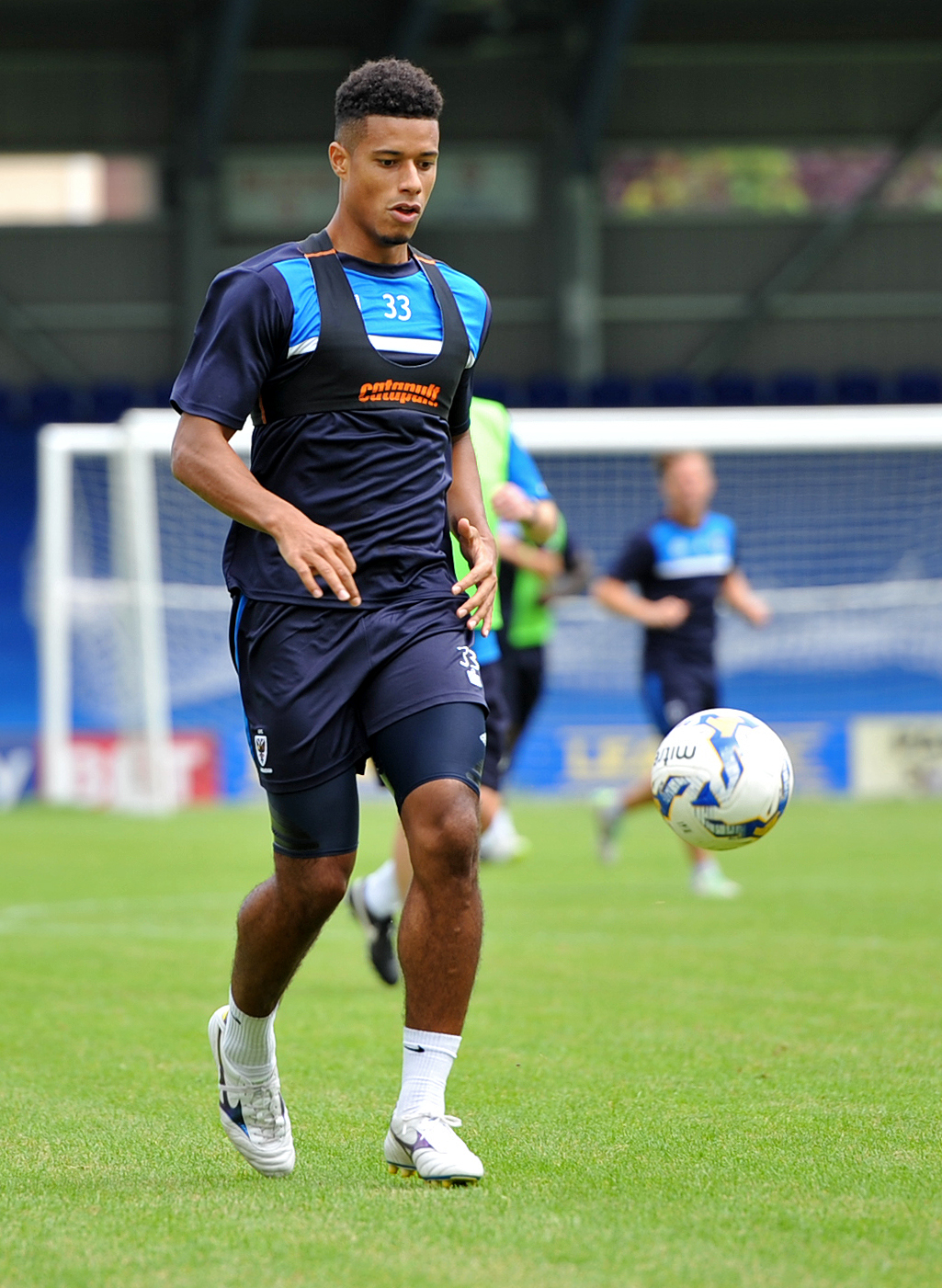
Lyle Taylor is Montserrat's top scorer with 17 goals.

#	Player	Goals	Caps	Ratio	Career
1	**Lyle Taylor**	17	24	0.71	2015–present
2	**Brandon Barzey**	6	23	0.26	2022–present
2	Adrian Clifton	6	23	0.26	2015–2023
4	**Ashley Boatswain**	5	14	0.36	2024–present
5	Jay'lee Hodgson	4	7	0.57	2011–2014
5	Bradley Woods-Garness	4	19	0.21	2012–2024
7	Vladimir Farrell	3	12	0.25	2000–2010
7	Spencer Weir-Daley	3	18	0.17	2015–2023
7	**Kaleem Simon**	3	20	0.15	2021–present
10	Marlon Campbell	2	3	0.67	2012
10	Ellis Remy	2	6	0.33	2010–2014
10	Nathan Pond	2	13	0.15	2019–2023

== Competitive record ==
=== FIFA World Cup ===
FIFA World Cup record									Qualification					
Year	Round	Position	Pld	W	D*	L	GF	GA	Pld	W	D	L	GF	GA
1930 to 1994	Not a FIFA member								Not a FIFA member					
(France); 1998	Did not enter								Did not enter					
(South Korea) (Japan); 2002	Did not qualify								2	0	0	2	1	6
(Germany); 2006	Did not qualify								2	0	0	2	0	20
(South Africa); 2010	Did not qualify								1	0	0	1	1	7
(Brazil); 2014	Did not qualify								2	0	0	2	3	8
(Russia); 2018	Did not qualify								2	0	1	1	3	4
(Qatar); 2022	Did not qualify								4	2	2	0	9	4
(Canada) (Mexico) (United States); 2026	Did not qualify								4	1	0	3	3	10
(Morocco) (Portugal) (Spain); 2030	To be determined								To be determined					
(Saudi Arabia); 2034	To be determined								To be determined					
Total		0/7	–	–	–	–	–	–	17	3	3	11	20	59

=== CONCACAF Gold Cup ===
CONCACAF Gold Cup record
Year	Round	Position	Pld	W	D*	L	GF	GA
(United States) 1991	Did not qualify							
(Mexico) (United States) 1993	Did not enter							
(United States) 1996	Did not qualify							
(United States) 1998	Did not enter							
2000 and 2002	Did not qualify							
(Mexico) (United States) 2003	Withdrew							
(United States) 2005	Did not qualify							
2007 and 2009	Did not enter							
2011 to 2015	Did not qualify							
(United States) 2017	Did not enter							
2019 to 2025	Did not qualify							
Total		0/18	–	–	–	–	–	

=== CONCACAF Nations League ===
CONCACAF Nations League record
League										Finals								
Season	Division	Group	Pld	W	D	L	GF	GA	P/R	Finals	Result	Pld	W	D	L	GF	GA	Squad
2019–20	B	B	6	2	2	2	4	5	Same position	(United States) 2021	Ineligible							
2022–23	B	B	6	1	1	4	6	14	Same position	(United States) 2023	Ineligible							
2023–24	B	B	6	3	0	3	9	14	Same position	(United States) 2024	Ineligible							
2024–25	B	A	6	1	0	5	3	10	▼	(United States) 2025	Ineligible							
Total	—	—	24	7	3	14	21	43	—	Total	0 Titles	—	—	—	—	—	—	—

=== Caribbean Cup ===
Caribbean Cup record
Year	Round	Position	Pld	W	D*	L	GF	GA
1989 and 1990	Did not enter							
1991 and 1992	Did not qualify							
(Jamaica) 1993	Did not enter							
1994 and 1995	Did not qualify							
1996 to 1998	Did not enter							
1999 to 2005	Did not qualify							
2007 and 2008	Did not enter							
2010 to 2014	Did not qualify							
(Martinique) 2017	Did not enter							
Total		0/19	–	–	–	–	–	–

== Head-to-head record ==
As of 1 October 2026

Key
Positive balance (more Wins)
Neutral balance (Wins = Losses)
Negative balance (more Losses)

Against	Played	Won	Drawn	Lost	GF	GA	GD	% Won
Anguilla	4	2	1	1	6	7	−1	50.00%
Antigua and Barbuda	4	0	1	3	6	20	−14	00.00%
Aruba	1	1	0	0	2	0	+2	100.00%
Barbados	4	3	0	1	11	11	0	75.00%
Belize	4	2	0	2	5	8	−3	50.00%
Bermuda	3	1	0	2	3	22	−19	33.33%
Bhutan	1	0	0	1	0	4	−4	00.00%
Bonaire	5	2	1	2	2	2	0	40.00%
British Virgin Islands	5	3	0	2	13	6	+7	60.00%
Cayman Islands	1	1	0	0	2	1	1	100%
Curaçao	2	0	1	1	3	4	−1	0%
Dominican Republic	7	3	1	3	7	12	−5	42.85%
El Salvador	7	0	1	6	4	15	−11	00.00%
Grenada	1	1	0	0	2	1	+1	100.00%
Guyana	3	0	1	2	1	5	–4	00.00%
Haiti	2	0	0	2	2	7	–5	00.00%
Martinique	1	0	0	1	0	5	−5	00.00%
Nicaragua	7	0	0	7	3	21	−18	00.00%
Panama	2	0	0	2	2	6	−4	00.00%
Saint Kitts and Nevis	4	0	0	4	2	29	−27	00.00%
Saint Lucia	3	1	1	1	2	4	−2	33.00%
Trinidad and Tobago	1	0	0	1	1	6	−5	00.00%
Saint Vincent and the Grenadines	6	0	0	6	1	33	−32	00.00%
Suriname	2	0	0	2	2	14	−12	00.00%
Turks and Caicos Islands	1	1	0	0	2	0	+2	100.00%
U.S. Virgin Islands	2	2	0	0	5	0	+5	100.00%
Total	81	23	8	50	90	238	−148	28.39%

Note: teams in italic are not FIFA members.

== Historical kits ==
2000s Home	2000s Away	2012 Home	2012 Away	2014 Home	2014 Away	2016 Home	2016 Away

2018 Home	2019 Home	2020 Home	2020 Away
