= David Viana =

Portuguese footballer

Personal information
- Full name: David Gonçalves Viana
- Date of birth: 22 January 1992 (age 34)
- Place of birth: Strasbourg, France
- Height: 1.73 m (5 ft 8 in)
- Position: Midfielder

Team information
- Current team: AS Mutzig

Youth career
- 2008–2011: Strasbourg

Senior career*
| Years | Team | Apps | (Gls) |
| 2011–2012 | Atlético Madrid C | 20 | (0) |
| 2012–2013 | Real Salt Lake | 2 | (0) |
| 2013–2014 | Luton Town | 0 | (0) |
| 2015 | Olhanense | 6 | (1) |
| 2016–2021 | ASC Biesheim | 115 | (20) |
| 2021–2022 | Mulhouse | 21 | (6) |
| 2022–2025 | ASC Biesheim | 0 | (0) |
| 2025– | AS Mutzig | | |

International career^{‡}
| 2009 | Portugal U17 | 6 | (1) |
| 2009 | Portugal U18 | 2 | (0) |
| 2010 | Portugal U19 | 7 | (0) |
- * Club domestic league appearances and goals as of 1 July 2022 ‡ National team caps and goals as of 15:08 17 December 2009 (UTC)

David Gonçalves Viana (born 22 January 1992) is a footballer who plays as a midfielder for AS Mutzig. Born in France, he has represented Portugal at youth level.

== Club career ==
=== Early career ===
Born in Strasbourg, France, Viana was part of RC Strasbourg B, the reserve team of RC Strasbourg Alsace. After Strasbourg was relegated from Ligue 1, Viana transferred to Atlético Madrid and was part of their C squad for a year, making 20 appearances.

=== Real Salt Lake ===
Despite being offered a contract extension by Atlético, Viana signed for Major League Soccer side Real Salt Lake on a free transfer on 18 September 2012 following a week-long trial and a MLS Reserve League appearance against Sporting Kansas City. Speaking on signing for RSL, Viana said, "I'm very excited... It's a great opportunity and I feel really good about getting to work with these coaches and players". He made his league debut for RSL on 17 October 2012 as a substitute for Luis Gil in an eventual 0–0 draw against Seattle Sounders FC.

On 11 July 2013, after two appearances, Viana was waived by Real Salt Lake.

=== Luton Town ===
Viana moved to English Conference Premier club Luton Town on 30 September 2013 following a successful trial period, during which he scored two goals in two matches. He signed a contract with the club until the end of the 2013–14 season. He made his debut in a 0–0 draw with Staines Town in the FA Trophy on 30 November 2013. He played in two further FA Trophy games, but did not make an appearance in the league as Luton won promotion to League Two with a club-record 101 points. On 9 May 2014, it was announced that Viana would not be offered a new contract and would leave Luton in June 2014.

=== Olhanense ===
On 24 January 2015, it was announced that Viana had signed for SC Olhanense of the Portuguese Segunda Liga.

=== ASCB ===
On 24 January 2016, it was announced that Viana had signed for ASC Biesheim of the French CFA2.

=== Mulhouse ===
Viana moved to FC Mulhouse in summer 2021.

== International career ==
Viana holds both French and Portuguese nationalities and has represented Portugal at Under-17, Under-18, and Under-19 levels.
