= Andy Parry =

English footballer (born 1991)

Personal information
- Full name: Andrew James Parry
- Date of birth: 13 September 1991 (age 35)
- Place of birth: Liverpool, England
- Height: 1.79 m (5 ft 10 1/2 in)
- Positions: Defender; midfielder

Youth career
- 2007–2011: Blackburn Rovers

Senior career*
Years	Team	Apps	(Gls)
2011	Kettering Town	1	(0)
2011	Radcliffe Borough		
2011–2013	Southport	62	(2)
2013–2016	Luton Town	23	(3)
2014	→ AFC Telford United (loan)	10	(2)
2015	→ Southport (loan)	4	(0)
2015	→ Altrincham (loan)	10	(0)
2016	→ Barrow (loan)	2	(0)
2016–2018	Barrow	20	(0)
2018–2020	Southport	30	(0)
- * Club domestic league appearances and goals as of 8 February 2020 (UTC)

Andrew James Parry (born 13 September 1991) is an English professional footballer who plays as a defender or midfielder.

== Career ==
=== Early career ===
Born in Liverpool, Merseyside, Parry was part of the youth system at Lancashire club Blackburn Rovers between 2007 and 2011. He was released by Blackburn Rovers in the summer of 2011 without being offered a professional contract and later joined Conference Premier club Kettering Town. He made his debut and only appearance for the club in a 3–2 win at home to Newport County.

Parry went on trial with Northern Premier League Division One North club Radcliffe Borough on 9 November 2011. He made his league debut for Radcliffe Borough three days later in a 2–2 draw with Mossley. Parry played in a 2–2 draw with Fleetwood Town on 15 November in the Lancashire FA Challenge Trophy, in which he scored the winning penalty to eliminate Fleetwood from the competition. His final appearance for the club was in a 10–3 win over Harrogate Railway Athletic, in which Parry scored two goals.

=== Southport ===
On 24 November, Parry was transferred to Conference Premier club Southport. He made his debut for the club as a 78th-minute substitute in a 1–0 win away to Stockport County. Parry's first goal for the club came in the 2012–13 season on 29 September 2012 when he scored in a 3–1 defeat away to Luton Town. On 13 October, he scored once more in a 3–2 win away to Woking.

=== Luton Town ===
On 1 May 2013, Parry joined Conference Premier club Luton Town for an undisclosed fee. He started the season as a regular first-team player, primarily playing in central midfield, though suffered with injuries throughout the latter half of the campaign. Luton won promotion to League Two, with Parry playing in 23 league matches, scoring three goals.

Parry joined Conference Premier club AFC Telford United on a one-month loan deal on 7 October 2014, where he made 10 league appearances. He was then loaned out to former club Southport for one month in January 2015, playing in four matches. Parry returned to Luton but failed to make an appearance from the substitute's bench and was placed on the transfer list at the end of the season.

On 21 August 2015, Parry joined National League club Altrincham on a one-month loan. He made his debut for the club one day later in a 2–1 defeat away to Dover Athletic. On 23 September, Parry's loan spell with Altrincham was extended by a further month. Parry returned to Luton early before completing his extended loan spell due to two injuries disrupting his playing time.

=== Barrow ===
On 14 January 2016, Parry joined National League club Barrow on a one-month loan deal. After making two appearances for Barrow, Luton came to a mutual agreement with Parry to cancel his contract, allowing him to sign a permanent contract with Barrow until the end of the 2015–16 season. Parry went on to make 18 appearances for the club in all competitions. At the end of the season, Parry signed a new one-year contract with Barrow, including the option of a one-year extension dependent on appearances. After making two starts and three substitute appearances from the opening eight matches of the 2016–17 season, Parry sustained ruptured cruciate knee ligaments as a result of two separate training session incidents and underwent surgery in October, ruling him out for the remainder of the season.

=== Return to Southport ===
In May 2018 he rejoined Southport for a third time. He left the club in summer 2020.

== Career statistics ==
As of match played 8 February 2020

Appearances and goals by club, season and competition
Club	Season	League			FA Cup		League Cup		Other		Total	
Club	Season	Division	Apps	Goals	Apps	Goals	Apps	Goals	Apps	Goals	Apps	Goals
Kettering Town	2011–12	Conference Premier	1	0	0	0	—		0	0	1	0
Southport	2011–12	Conference Premier	24	0	0	0	—		0	0	24	0
Southport	2012–13	Conference Premier	38	2	1	0	—		4 (Note: Appearance(s) in FA Trophy)	1	43	3
Southport	Total		62	2	1	0	—		4	1	67	3
Luton Town	2013–14	Conference Premier	23	3	2	0	—		1	1	26	4
Luton Town	2014–15	League Two	0	0	—		0	0	0	0	0	0
Luton Town	Total		23	3	2	0	0	0	1	1	26	4
AFC Telford United (loan)	2014–15	Conference Premier	10	2	4	1	—		—		14	3
Southport (loan)	2014–15	Conference Premier	4	0	—		—		—		4	0
Altrincham (loan)	2015–16	National League	10	0	—		—		—		10	0
Barrow	2015–16	National League	17	0	—		—		1	0	18	0
Barrow	2016–17	National League	5	0	0	0	—		0	0	5	0
Barrow	Total		22	0	0	0	—		1	0	23	0
Southport	2018–19	National League North	21	0	1	0	—		1	0	23	0
Southport	2019–20	National League North	9	0	0	0	—		0	0	9	0
Southport	Total		30	0	1	0	—		1	0	32	0
Career total			152	7	8	1	0	0	7	2	167	10

== Honours ==
Luton Town

- Conference Premier: 2013–14
