= Jernade Meade =

Montserratian footballer

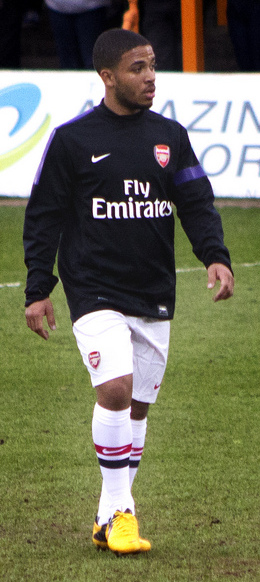
- Meade warming up for Arsenal Reserves at Underhill Stadium

Personal information
- Full name: Jernade Ronnel Meade
- Date of birth: 25 October 1992 (age 34)
- Place of birth: Luton, England
- Height: 1.65 m (5 ft 5 in)
- Positions: Left-back; left winger

Team information
- Current team: Royston Town

Youth career
- 2002–2004: Bramingham
- 2004–2012: Arsenal

Senior career*
Years	Team	Apps	(Gls)
2012–2013	Arsenal	0	(0)
2013–2014	Swansea City	0	(0)
2014	→ Luton Town (loan)	0	(0)
2014–2015	Hadley	33	(9)
2015–2016	St Albans City	11	(1)
2016–2017	AFC Eskilstuna	48	(1)
2018–2019	Aalesund	13	(1)
2020–2022	Dartford	19	(0)
2022–2023	Hemel Hempstead Town	17	(0)
2023	Dartford	13	(1)
2023–2024	Tonbridge Angels	30	(1)
2024–2026	St Ives Town	76	(4)
2026–	Royston Town	3	(0)

International career^{‡}
2021–	Montserrat	21	(0)
- * Club domestic league appearances and goals as of 22:02, 4 June 2025 (UTC) ‡ National team caps and goals as of 15:47, 13 November 2026 (UTC)

Jernade Ronnel Meade (born 25 October 1992) is a footballer who plays for Royston Town. Born in England, he represents the Montserrat national team.

Meade is a left back, but can also be utilised as a left winger.

== Club career ==
=== Arsenal ===
Meade was born in Luton, England, and started his career with Sunday league side Bramingham FC. He joined Arsenal in August 2004 at the age of eleven. He started off initially as a left winger before moving into a more defensive role as a left back. During the 2011–12 season he made nineteen appearances for the reserve side, with only Oğuzhan Özyakup and Martin Angha appearing more. In the same season he also appeared on the bench as an unused substitute for Arsenal's first team against Bolton Wanderers in a League Cup fixture.

Meade featured in pre-season friendly matches in advance of the 2012–13 season, including a game against Premier League opposition Southampton. After eight years with the club, he made his first team debut in a dramatic 7–5 extra time victory against Reading in the League Cup fourth round. Meade entered the match as a substitute, replacing the injured Ignasi Miquel in the 105th minute. In the process, he became the 811th player to have played for Arsenal. On 4 December 2012, Meade made his first start for Arsenal in a Champions League game against Olympiacos, where he was deployed at left back. The match ended in a 2–1 defeat for Arsenal with Meade being replaced late on by Martin Angha. His contract with Arsenal expired at the end of 2012–13 season and, on 20 May 2013, it was announced that Meade would not be offered a new contract and would be released to find another club.

=== Swansea ===
On 16 July 2013, he agreed a deal to join Premier League side Swansea City on a one-year contract. He played regularly for Swansea's Under-21 side in the Professional Development League during the first half of the 2013–14 season.

On 28 January 2014, Meade joined his hometown club Luton Town on loan for the remainder of the 2013–14 season. He did not feature for Luton's first-team during his time at the club, appearing only in development squad games, with manager John Still stating that he "would have liked to have seen [Meade] do a bit better".

Meade was released by Swansea in May 2014.

He then moved to St Albans City, being signed from Spartan South Midlands Football League side Hadley in November 2015.

=== Scandinavia ===
On 9 February 2016, Meade joined Swedish Superettan side AFC Eskilstuna.

He signed for Aalesund of Norwegian 1. divisjon on 26 March 2018, after being out of contract since the turn of the year.

=== Dartford (first spell) ===
On 15 December 2020, Meade joined Dartford. On 22 June 2022, it was confirmed that Meade had left Dartford and was seeking a club at a higher level.

=== Hemel Hempstead Town ===
On 15 July 2022, Meade joined Hemel Hempstead Town.

=== Dartford (second spell) ===
On 20 January 2023, Meade re-joined Dartford.

=== Tonbridge Angels ===
On 16 July 2023, Meade joined Tonbridge Angels.

== International career ==
Meade was called up to the Montserrat squad for 2022 FIFA World Cup qualification in March 2021. He made his debut against Grenada on 8 June 2021.

== Personal life ==
Meade, who is a former Barnfield West Academy pupil, grew up on a council estate in Lewsey Farm with two brothers in a single parent family.

== Career statistics ==
As of 29 January 2014

Appearances and goals by club, season and competition
Club	Season	League		FA Cup		League Cup		Other		Total	
Club	Season	Apps	Goals	Apps	Goals	Apps	Goals	Apps	Goals	Apps	Goals
Arsenal	2012–13	0	0	0	0	1	0	1 (Note: Appearance(s) in UEFA Champions League)	0	2	0
Swansea City	2013–14	0	0	0	0	0	0	0	0	0	0
Luton Town (loan)	2013–14	0	0	0	0	–		0	0	0	0
Career total		0	0	0	0	1	0	1	0	2	0
