= Rory May =

English footballer (born 1984)

Personal information
- Full name: Rory Joseph May
- Date of birth: 25 November 1984 (age 41)
- Place of birth: Coventry, England
- Position: Striker

Team information
- Current team: Willenhall Town F.C.

Youth career
- 2001–2003: Coventry City

Senior career*
Years	Team	Apps	(Gls)
2003–2004	Lincoln City	5	(0)
2003–2004	→ Halifax Town (loan)	3	(0)
2004–2005	Tamworth	7	(1)
2004–2005	→Moor Green (loan)		
2004–2005	→Redditch United (loan)		
2004–2005	Redditch United		
2005–2006	Sutton Coldfield Town		
2005–2006	Stourport Swifts		
2005–2006	Redditch United		
2006–2007	Solihull Borough		
2006–2007	Brackley Town		
2006–2007	Solihull Borough		
2007–2008	Stratford Town	20	(14)
2007–2008	Hednesford Town	9	(3)
2007–2008	→Worcester City (loan)		
2008	Stratford Town	5	(3)
2008–2009	Willenhall Town		
- * Club domestic league appearances and goals as of 03:15, 23 September 2007 (UTC)

Rory Joseph May (born 25 November 1984 in Coventry, England) is an English footballer who plays for Worcester City. He played professionally for Lincoln City but having dropped out of league football he has had numerous short stints with clubs in the Midlands without finding a regular home.

== Professional career ==
May begin his career in the academy at Coventry City, joining Tamworth on a work-experience basis toward the end of the 2002–03 season. He signed for Lincoln City in the summer of 2003. In March 2004 he joined Halifax Town on a loan basis.

== 2004–2005 Season ==
Following his release by Lincoln, May rejoined Tamworth. He struggled to make an impression with Tamworth and was loaned out to Moor Green in September 2004 and Redditch United in November 2004. He made an immediate impression, scoring twice on his debut against Merthyr Tydfil in the FA Trophy but ran into problems when he turned up late for the following weeks fixture against Sutton Coldfield Town. He returned to Tamworth, having his contract terminated in December 2004. Although he was offered a deal by Bromsgrove Rovers, he spent four months out of football before rejoining Redditch United.

== 2005–2006 Season ==
He commenced the season at Sutton Coldfield but was on the move again in November 2005, linking up with Stourport Swifts. In December 2005, Stourport accused Redditch United of marking an illegal approach for the player but this did not prevent May rejoining Redditch in January 2006 where he remained and won the Birmingham senior cup after coming on as a sub and claiming the winner, against Birmingham City, until being released at the end of the season.

== 2006–2007 Season ==
He joined Solihull Borough for the 2006–2007 season scoring 30 goals in 39 appearances, moving on to Brackley Town in February 2007 before rejoining Solihull a little over a month later.

== 2007–2008 Season ==
May began the season with Stratford Town, scoring 14 league goals in just 20 appearances. Having impressed against them in an FA Cup tie earlier in the season, May joined up with Hednesford Town in January 2008 with Hednesford manager Phil Starbuck stating that "I've bought Rory in to give us more of a physical presence up front, it will help stop the ball coming straight back as it causes problems for the defence." In April 2008, May was on the move again, joining Worcester City on loan for the remainder of the season.

== 2008–2009 Season ==
After rejoining Stratford Town for the start of the 08–09 season (scoring three goals in five league appearances), May joined Willenhall Town in the Northern Premier League Div 1 South in September 2008.
