= Kenny Dyer =

Footballer (born 1964)

Personal information
- Date of birth: 7 September 1964 (age 62)
- Place of birth: London, England
- Height: 5 ft 10 in (1.78 m)
- Position: Midfielder

Youth career
- Arsenal
- Tottenham Hotspur
- Charlton Athletic

Senior career*
Years	Team	Apps	(Gls)
1986–1987	Maidstone United		
1987–1988	Chatham Town		
1988–1991	Nea Salamina Famagusta		
1991–1992	Dover Athletic		
1992–1995	Ethnikos Akhnas	73	(6)
1995–1996	Dagenham & Redbridge	19	(1)
1996–1999	Ethnikos Akhnas	68	(3)
1999–2000	Slough Town	25	(1)
2001–2002	Hayes	38	(2)
2002–2003	Dover Athletic	47	(0)
2003–2004	Chatham Town		

International career
2008–2010	Montserrat	4	(0)

Managerial career
- 2004–2005: Haringey Borough
- 2006: Montserrat U21
- 2008–2013: Montserrat
- * Club domestic league appearances and goals

Kenny Dyer (born 7 September 1964) is a football player and former coach. Born in England, he earned four caps for the Montserrat national team.

== Playing career ==
Dyer played youth football for Arsenal, Tottenham Hotspur and Charlton Athletic, before playing senior football with Maidstone United, Chatham Town, Dover Athletic, Dagenham & Redbridge, Slough Town and Hayes.

Dyer also played professionally in Cyprus, for clubs including Ethnikos Achna and Nea Salamis Famagusta.

Dyer has represented the Montserrat national team at international level, including three games at the 2010 Caribbean Championship at the age of 46.

== Coaching career ==
Dyer managed English non-league side Haringey Borough between 2004 and 2005. Dyer coached the Montserrat national team in 2008. He resigned in 2013 expressing disappointment with the game's administration. Dyer also coached the Montserrat under-21 side in 2006.
