= Daniel Lunan =

English footballer (born 1984)

Personal information
- Full name: Daniel Dean Lunan
- Date of birth: 14 March 1984 (age 42)
- Place of birth: Bromley, England
- Position: Defender

Youth career
- Maldon Town
- Canvey Island
- Hornchurch
- Southend United

Senior career*
Years	Team	Apps	(Gls)
?–2003	Southend United	1	(0)
2003–2004	Grays Athletic	43	(1)
2004–200?	Fisher Athletic	?	(?)
200?–200?	Redbridge	?	(?)
2006	Chelmsford City	?	(?)
2006–2007	East Thurrock United	?	(?)
2007–200?	Thurrock	?	(?)
200?–2009	Bishop's Stortford	?	(?)
2009–20??	Tiptree United	?	(?)
- * Club domestic league appearances and goals

Daniel Dean Lunan (born 14 March 1984) is an English former semi-professional footballer who played as a defender. He played once in the Football League with Southend United, before dropping into non-League football.

== Career ==
Lunan started his career as a youth player with Maldon Town, Canvey Island and Hornchurch before moving to Southend United. He made one appearance for Southend United in the Third Division, replacing Dave McSweeney as a substitute in the 3–1 home win against Exeter City on 1 April 2002.

He dropped into non-League football joining Grays Athletic in the summer of 2003, playing in the Isthmian League Premier Division and Conference South with the club. In November 2004, Lunan joined Fisher Athletic following his release from Grays. He then had spells with Redbridge, Chelmsford City before joining East Thurrock United in August 2006. Lunan joined Conference South team Thurrock in 2007, making his debut against Salisbury City in the 0–0 draw on 17 March 2007. He went on to make another nine appearances for Thurrock in the league during the 2006–07. Lunan then moved to Bishop's Stortford, before joining Tiptree United in June 2009.
