= Luke Wilkinson =

Footballer (born 1991)

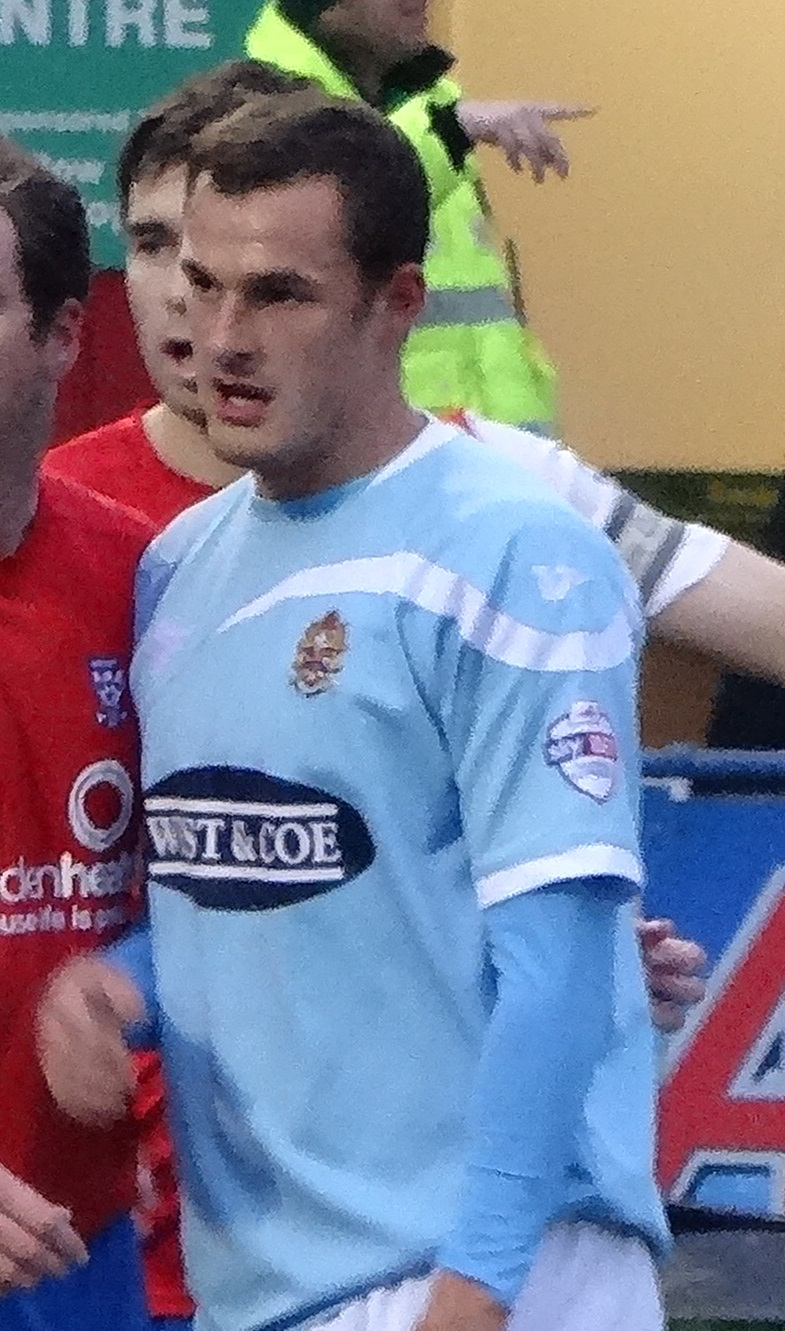
- Wilkinson playing for Dagenham & Redbridge in 2014

Personal information
- Full name: Luke Alexander Wilkinson
- Date of birth: 29 September 1990 (age 36)
- Place of birth: Wells, England
- Height: 6 ft 2 in (1.88 m)
- Position: Defender

Team information
- Current team: Wells City

Youth career
- 2007–2009: Bristol City

Senior career*
Years	Team	Apps	(Gls)
2009–2010	Portsmouth	0	(0)
2010	→ Northampton Town (loan)	0	(0)
2010	→ Eastleigh (loan)	6	(1)
2010–2014	Dagenham & Redbridge	65	(6)
2010–2011	→ Boreham Wood (loan)	26	(1)
2011–2012	→ Boreham Wood (loan)	23	(3)
2012	→ Dartford (loan)	14	(4)
2014–2016	Luton Town	62	(7)
2016–2019	Stevenage	104	(8)
2019–2022	Yeovil Town	77	(6)
2022–2024	Woking	49	(3)
2024–2025	Salisbury	17	(0)
2025–	Wells City		
- * Club domestic league appearances and goals as of 12:45, 8 June 2025 (UTC)

Luke Alexander Wilkinson (born 29 September 1990) is an English footballer who plays as a defender for Western League Premier Division club Wells City.

== Youth career ==
Wilkinson was born in Wells, Somerset. He started his career in the youth system of Bristol City and was offered a two-year scholarship in June 2007. He was part of the side that competed in the Premier Academy League.

== Club career ==
=== Portsmouth ===
Wilkinson was released early from his contract with Bristol City at the age of 17 and was offered a trial by Premier League club Portsmouth. He played in a reserve game against Fulham, in which first-team manager Paul Hart described as the most impressive debut he had seen from any young player. The reserves remained unbeaten with Wilkinson in defence until the end of the season. His outstanding form for the reserves earned him a professional contract in July 2009.

In January 2010, he joined League Two club Northampton Town on a one-month loan, however, he failed to make an appearance for the club.

In February 2010, he joined Conference South club Eastleigh on an initial one-month loan, which was later extended until the end of the season.

=== Dagenham & Redbridge ===
In the summer of 2010, Wilkinson was released by Portsmouth and signed for newly promoted League One club Dagenham & Redbridge on a three-year contract. In November 2010, he joined Conference South club Boreham Wood on an initial one-month loan, making his debut in a 3–2 defeat at home to Dover Athletic. The loan was then extended by a further month, before it was extended once more until the end of the season. Wilkinson scored his first goal on the final day of 2010–11 in a 3–0 win at home to Lewes and finished the season with 28 appearances. He rejoined Boreham Wood in August 2011 on a five-month loan. He was a mainstay in the team, making 25 appearances, the last of which came in a 2–1 defeat at home to Woking on 28 January 2012, before returning to Dagenham at the end of January. In February 2012, he joined fellow Conference South club Dartford on loan. In March 2012, his loan was extended until the end of the season after scoring two headers in consecutive wins over Havant & Waterlooville and Sutton United. He claimed his first piece of silverware as Dartford were promoted to the Conference Premier via their play-off win over Welling United on 13 May 2012.

Wilkinson made his professional debut for Dagenham on 1 September 2012 in a 2–2 draw Kingsmeadow to AFC Wimbledon. He cemented his place in the first-team by scoring four goals, which prompted Daggers manager John Still to offer him a new contract until 2015. He finished 2012–13 with 46 appearances in all competitions and won the club's Player of the Year award. This led to reported interest from Premier League clubs Aston Villa and Norwich City. However, no move materialised and Wilkinson admitted that he needed another few years to develop as a player before making the step up.

Wilkinson's start to the 2013–14 season was delayed by a groin injury picked up in pre-season, before making his return at the end of August in a 3–0 defeat to Mansfield Town. He went on to make 25 appearances but a combination of further injuries, the form of Scott Doe and Brian Saah, and the late emergence of Ian Gayle resigned Wilkinson to the bench for the majority of the season. In May 2014, he was placed on the transfer list at his own request and his name was circulated to other clubs highlighting his availability. In June 2014, he stated he was happy to fight for his place if a move away from the club didn't materialise.

=== Luton Town ===
On 7 July 2014, Wilkinson signed for League Two club Luton Town on a one-year contract, managed by his former Dagenham manager John Still, for an undisclosed fee. He debuted on the opening day of 2014–15 in a 1–0 win away to Carlisle United, Luton's first Football League match in five years. Wilkinson scored his first goal in a 2–0 win at home to Oxford United on 27 September 2014, and this was followed up with a goal in the following match, a 2–1 win away to Stevenage. He was named League Two Player of the Month for September 2014, during which Luton kept a clean sheet in each of the four matches Wilkinson played in that month. Wilkinson was sent off on two occasions, the first coming in stoppage time during a 1–0 defeat away to Burton Albion on 22 November, a result that ended Luton's 11-match unbeaten run in League Two, and the second coming in a 1–0 win at home to Carlisle United on 14 February 2015. The latter red card coincided with a four match suspension for defensive partner Steve McNulty, who was sent off for a studs-up challenge in the previous match, a 2–2 draw at home to York City. In their absence, Luton lost twice in a row, during which stand-in defenders Alex Lacey and Fraser Franks failed to impress. Wilkinson finished the season with four goals from 48 appearances, triggering a one-year contract extension to keep him at Luton until the summer of 2016.

Wilkinson made his first appearance of 2015–16 in the starting lineup away to Accrington Stanley on the opening day of the season, which finished as a 1–1 draw, and followed up with a goal in the following league match, a 2–2 draw at home to Oxford United on 15 August 2015. He went on to score two goals in September, the first coming in a 3–1 win away to Cambridge United on 5 September, and the second coming in a 3–1 win away to Morecambe on 29 September. Wilkinson made his final appearance for Luton in a 4–3 defeat at home to Northampton Town on 12 December.

=== Stevenage ===
On 22 January 2016, Wilkinson was sold to fellow League Two club Stevenage on a contract until the end of 2015–16, with Luton replacing him with Alan Sheehan, who was signed on loan from Bradford City later that day. Wilkinson said he was surprised by the decision but was looking forward to helping Stevenage climb the table. He debuted a day later in a 0–0 draw at home to Barnet. Wilkinson scored his first two goals for Stevenage in a 3–2 defeat at home to League Two leaders Northampton Town on 19 March. He finished the season with 19 appearances for Stevenage and signed a new undisclosed length contract with the club after the end of the season.

Wilkinson was released by Stevenage at the end of the 2018–19 season.

=== Yeovil Town ===
Following his release from Stevenage, Wilkinson signed for National League club Yeovil Town on a two-year contract.

=== Woking ===
On 20 May 2022, Wilkinson agreed to join fellow National League club Woking upon the expiry of his contract with Yeovil, signing a two-year contract and linking up with his former manager Darren Sarll. He went onto make his debut for the club during an opening day away defeat to York City, playing the full 90 minutes in a 2–0 loss. A month later, Wilkinson scored his first goal for the Cards, doubling the side's lead in a 3–0 home victory over Oldham Athletic. Wilkinson featured 27 times in his debut campaign with the Surrey-based side, becoming an influential figure in their play-off campaign.

During his second season at Woking, Wilkinson struggled with injuries and ultimately only featured 23 times in all competitions. On 24 April 2024, he announced that he would be leaving the club at the end of his contract.

== Career statistics ==
As of match played 26 December 2024

Appearances and goals by club, season and competition
Club	Season	League			FA Cup		League Cup		Other		Total	
Club	Season	Division	Apps	Goals	Apps	Goals	Apps	Goals	Apps	Goals	Apps	Goals
Eastleigh (loan)	2009–10	Conference South	6	1	—		—		—		6	1
Dagenham & Redbridge	2010–11	League One	0	0	0	0	0	0	0	0	0	0
Dagenham & Redbridge	2012–13	League Two	43	6	1	0	0	0	2 (Note: Appearance(s) in Football League Trophy)	0	46	6
Dagenham & Redbridge	2013–14	League Two	22	0	1	0	0	0	2	0	25	0
Dagenham & Redbridge	Total		65	6	2	0	0	0	4	0	71	6
Boreham Wood (loan)	2010–11	Conference South	26	1	—		—		2 (Note: Appearance(s) in FA Trophy)	0	28	1
Boreham Wood (loan)	2011–12	Conference South	23	3	1	0	—		1	0	25	3
Boreham Wood (loan)	Total		49	4	1	0	—		3	0	53	4
Dartford (loan)	2011–12	Conference South	14	4	—		—		4 (Note: One appearance in Kent Senior Cup, three in Conference South play-offs)	0	18	4
Luton Town	2014–15	League Two	42	4	4	0	1	0	1	0	48	4
Luton Town	2015–16	League Two	20	3	2	0	2	0	0	0	24	3
Luton Town	Total		62	7	6	0	3	0	1	0	72	7
Stevenage	2015–16	League Two	19	2	—		—		—		19	2
Stevenage	2016–17	League Two	40	4	1	0	2	0	2 (Note: Appearances in EFL Trophy)	0	45	4
Stevenage	2017–18	League Two	27	1	2	0	1	0	3	0	33	1
Stevenage	2018–19	League Two	18	1	1	0	0	0	3	0	22	1
Stevenage	Total		104	8	4	0	3	0	8	0	119	8
Yeovil Town	2019–20	National League	26	3	2	1	—		3 (Note: Two appearances in FA Trophy, one appearance in National League play-offs)	0	31	4
Yeovil Town	2020–21	National League	18	2	2	1	—		0	0	20	3
Yeovil Town	2021–22	National League	33	1	3	0	—		2 (Note: One appearance in FA Trophy, one appearance in Somerset Premier Cup)	0	38	1
Yeovil Town	Total		77	6	7	2	—		5	0	89	8
Woking	2022–23	National League	26	3	1	0	—		0	0	27	3
Woking	2023–24	National League	23	0	0	0	—		1	0	24	0
Woking	Total		49	3	1	0	—		1	0	51	3
Salisbury	2024–25	National League South	17	0	2	0	—		2	0	21	0
Career total			443	39	23	2	6	0	27	0	501	41

== Honours ==
Dartford

- Conference South play-offs: 2011–12

Individual

- Dagenham & Redbridge Player of the Year: 2012–13
- Football League Two Player of the Month: September 2014
