= 2014–15 Luton Town F.C. season =

English football club season

Luton Town
2014–15 season
- Owner: Luton Town Football Club 2020 Ltd
- Chairman: Nick Owen
- Manager: John Still
- Stadium: Kenilworth Road
- League Two: 8th
- FA Cup: Third round
- League Cup: First round
- Football League Trophy: Second round
- Top goalscorer: League: Mark Cullen (13); All: Mark Cullen (14)
- Highest home attendance: 10,071 vs Portsmouth, League Two, 28 December 2014
- Lowest home attendance: 2,186 vs Crawley Town, Football League Trophy, 7 October 2014
- Average home league attendance: 7,901
Home colours	Away colours

The 2014–15 season was the 129th in the history of Luton Town Football Club and the club's first back in the Football League since the 2008–09 season following its promotion from the Conference Premier during the previous season. Luton finished in eighth position, one place and three points outside the play-offs.

Luton had an indifferent start to the campaign before a strong run of results placed the club in a four-way battle for the automatic promotion spots for much of the season, alongside Burton Albion, Wycombe Wanderers and Shrewsbury Town. A collapse in Luton's form in the final third of the season left them struggling to remain in the promotion positions and, despite a late run of positive results, the club fell just short of competing in the play-offs.

This article covers the period from 1 July 2014 to 30 June 2015.

== Background ==
Luton manager John Still had joined the club in February 2013 at a time when promotion from the Conference Premier looked unlikely following a poor run of league results under previous manager Paul Buckle. Still guided the club to a seventh-placed finish in its fourth season in non-League football. He began building his own squad a month before the last game of the 2012–13 campaign, continuing to do so through pre-season and the beginning of the 2013–14 season, with twelve new players entering Kenilworth Road and eleven leaving.

A slow start to the 2013–14 season left the club in mid-table, but this soon gave way to a club-record 27-match unbeaten run with Luton playing an attacking style of football that resulted in them scoring 78 goals. The club reached the top of the table in December 2013 and Still ensured momentum through the busy post-Christmas schedule by augmenting the squad with talented young players from Premier League academies, such as Pelly Ruddock Mpanzu and Cameron McGeehan. Luton remained in first position for the rest of the campaign as they comfortably won promotion to League Two, with nearest rivals Cambridge United 19 points behind – the largest points gap between first and second in Conference history. The club accumulated 101 points and kept 23 clean sheets, both club records, while also equalling the record for the fewest goals (35) conceded over a season.

== Club ==
=== Squad ===
Squad No.	Name	Nationality	Position(s)	Since	Date of birth (age)	Signed from
Goalkeepers
1	Mark Tyler	(England)	GK	2009	2 May 1977 (age 49)	(England) Peterborough United
16	Elliot Justham	(England)	GK	2013	18 August 1990 (age 36)	(England) East Thurrock United
Defenders
2	Fraser Franks	(England)	RB / CB	2014	22 November 1990 (age 35)	(England) Welling United
3	Danny Fitzsimons	(Republic of Ireland)	CB	2013	5 May 1990 (age 36)	(England) Histon
5	Steve McNulty (c)	(England)	CB	2013	26 September 1983 (age 43)	(England) Fleetwood Town
6	Alex Lacey	(England)	CB	2012	8 May 1994 (age 32)	(England) Luton Town Academy
12	Scott Griffiths	(England)	LB	2013	27 November 1985 (age 40)	(England) Peterborough United
29	Paul Connolly	(England)	RB	2014	29 September 1983 (age 43)	(England) Crawley Town
30	Luke Wilkinson	(England)	CB	2014	2 December 1991 (age 34)	(England) Dagenham & Redbridge
24	Curtley Williams	(England)	RB	2014	19 March 1990 (age 36)	(England) Lowestoft Town
33	Mark Onyemah	(England)	LB	2014		(England) Thurrock
Midfielders
4	Jonathan Smith	(England)	CM	2013	17 October 1986 (age 40)	(England) York City
7	Alex Lawless	(Wales)	LM	2010	26 March 1985 (age 41)	(England) York City
8	Andy Drury	(England)	CM	2014	28 November 1983 (age 42)	(England) Crawley Town
11	Jake Howells	(Wales)	LB / LM	2008	18 May 1991 (age 35)	(England) Luton Town Academy
14	Andy Parry	(England)	CM	2011	13 September 1991 (age 35)	(England) Southport
15	Luke Rooney	(England)	RW	2014	28 December 1990 (age 35)	(England) Maidstone United
17	Pelly Ruddock	(England)	CM	2014	17 July 1993 (age 33)	(England) West Ham United
21	Luke Guttridge	(England)	CM	2013	27 March 1982 (age 44)	(England) Northampton Town
22	Shaun Whalley	(England)	RW	2013	7 July 1987 (age 39)	(England) Southport
23	Matt Robinson	(England)	CM	2012	1 June 1994 (age 32)	(England) Leicester City
28	Jim Stevenson	(England)	CM	2012	17 May 1992 (age 34)	(England) Histon
39	Ian Rees	(England)	CM	2014	22 February 1998 (age 28)	(England) Luton Town Academy
Forwards
9	Paul Benson	(England)	ST	2014	12 October 1979 (age 47)	(England) Swindon Town
10	Alex Wall	(England)	ST	2013	22 September 1990 (age 36)	(England) Maidenhead United
13	Mark Cullen	(England)	ST	2013	21 May 1992 (age 34)	(England) Hull City
18	Ross Lafayette	(England)	ST	2014	11 April 1987 (age 39)	(England) Welling United
19	Ricky Miller	(England)	ST	2014	13 March 1989 (age 37)	(England) Boston United
35	Charlie Walker	(England)	ST	2014		(England) Peacehaven & Telscombe

== New contracts ==
No.	Pos	Player	Contract length	Contract end	Date	Source
13	ST	(England) Mark Cullen	3 years	2017	15 May 2014	
26	RW	(England) Luke Rooney	6 months	2015	4 February 2015	
5	CB	(England) Steve McNulty	2 years	2016	23 July 2014	
11	LW	(England) Jake Howells	2 years	2016	25 July 2014	
26	RW	(England) Luke Rooney	6 months	2015	7 January 2015	

== Transfers ==
=== In ===
==== Summer ====
No.	Pos	Player	Transferred From	Fee	Date	Source
24	RB	(England) Curtley Williams	(England) Lowestoft Town	Undisclosed	15 May 2014	
18	ST	(England) Ross Lafayette	(England) Welling United	Undisclosed	11 June 2014	
19	ST	(England) Ricky Miller	(England) Boston United	Free	25 June 2014	
8	MF	(England) Andy Drury	(England) Crawley Town	£100,000	30 June 2014	
29	RB	(England) Paul Connolly	(England) Crawley Town	Free	5 July 2014	
30	RB	(England) Luke Wilkinson	(England) Dagenham & Redbridge	Undisclosed	7 July 2014	
—	ST	(England) Lee Angol	(England) Wycombe Wanderers	Undisclosed	9 July 2014	
9	ST	(England) Paul Benson	(England) Swindon Town	Free	23 July 2014	
35	ST	(England) Charlie Walker	(England) Peacehaven & Telscombe	Free	23 July 2014	
33	LB	(England) Mark Onyemah	(England) Thurrock	Free	23 July 2014	
26	MF	(England) Nathan Doyle	(England) Bradford City	Free	11 September 2014	

==== Winter ====
No.	Pos	Player	Transferred From	Fee	Date	Source
27	MF	(England) Ryan Hall	(England) Rotherham United	Free	31 January 2015	

=== Out ===
==== Summer ====
No.	Pos	Player	Transferred To	Fee	Date	Source
3	LB	(Republic of Ireland) Danny Fitzsimons	(England) Dartford	Released	18 May 2015	
19	ST	(England) Ricky Miller	(England) Dover Athletic	Released	18 May 2015	
22	RW	(England) Shaun Whalley	(England) Shrewsbury Town	Released	18 May 2015	
10	ST	(England) Alex Wall	(England) Bromley	Released	30 June 2015	
13	ST	(England) Mark Cullen	(England) Blackpool	£180,000	30 June 2015	
28	CM	(England) Jim Stevenson	(England) Aldershot Town	Released	30 June 2015	
32	RB	(England) Brett Longden	(England) St Neots Town	Released	30 June 2015	
35	ST	(England) Charlie Walker	(England) Aldershot Town	Released	30 June 2015	
36	CM	(England) Charlie Smith		Released	30 June 2015	
39	CM	(England) Ian Rees	(England) Hemel Hempstead Town	Released	30 June 2015	
—	ST	(England) Lee Angol	(England) Peterborough United	Compensation	30 June 2015	
—	RW	(England) Kynan Isaac		Released	30 June 2015	

==== Winter ====
No.	Pos	Player	Transferred To	Fee	Date	Source
—	MF	(Nigeria) Solomon Taiwo	(England) Dover Athletic	Released	15 January 2015	
—	MF	(England) Dave Martin	(England) Stevenage	Released	2 February 2015	

=== Loans in ===
==== Summer ====
No.	Pos	Player	Transferred To	Start	End	Source
22	RB	(Republic of Ireland) Michael Harriman	(England) Queens Park Rangers	9 October 2014	14 November 2015	

==== Winter ====
No.	Pos	Player	Transferred To	Start	End	Source
22	RB	(Republic of Ireland) Michael Harriman	(England) Queens Park Rangers	14 November 2014	30 June 2015	
25	ST	(England) Jayden Stockley	(England) AFC Bournemouth	7 January 2015	4 February 2015	
31	ST	(England) Nathan Oduwa	(England) Tottenham Hotspur	2 February 2015	30 June 2015	
50	MF	(Northern Ireland) Cameron McGeehan	(England) Norwich City	14 February 2015	30 June 2015	
38	ST	(England) Elliot Lee	(England) West Ham United	19 February 2015	2 May 2015	
—	DF	(England) Lewis Kinsella	(England) Aston Villa	26 March 2015	30 June 2015	

=== Loans out ===
==== Summer ====
No.	Pos	Player	Loaned To	Start	End	Source
—	MF	(England) Lee Angol	(England) Boreham Wood	9 July 2014	30 June 2015	
—	MF	(England) Dave Martin	(England) Bristol Rovers	15 August 2014	5 January 2015	
19	FW	(England) Ricky Miller	(England) Dover Athletic	1 September 2014	29 October 2014	
—	MF	(Nigeria) Solomon Taiwo	(England) Dover Athletic	1 September 2014	29 October 2014	
—	MF	(England) Kynan Isaac	(England) Oxford City	9 September 2014	11 December 2014	
33	DF	(England) Mark Onyemah	(England) Thurrock	9 September 2014	10 October 2014	

==== Winter ====
No.	Pos	Player	Loaned To	Start	End	Source
36	DF	(England) Charlie Smith	(England) St Albans City	7 January 2015	4 February 2015	
32	DF	(England) Brett Longden	(England) Arlesey Town	7 January 2015	4 February 2015	
	DF	(England) Andy Parry	(England) Southport	13 January 2015	14 February 2015	
18	DF	(England) Ross Lafayette	(England) Woking	15 January 2015	14 February 2015	
	MF	(England) Kynan Isaac	(England) Banbury United	13 February 2015	14 March 2015	
	GK	(England) Craig King	(England) Metropolitan Police	13 February 2015	14 March 2015	
18	DF	(England) Ross Lafayette	(England) Welling United	26 March 2015	30 June 2015	
—	MF	(England) Ian Rees	(England) Hitchin Town	26 March 2014	30 June 2015	

=== Overall transfer activity ===
==== Spending ====
Summer: ▼£100,000

Total: ▼£100,000

==== Income ====
Summer: ▲£500,000

Total: ▲£500,000

==== Expenditure ====
Summer: ▲£400,000

Total: ▲£400,000

== Competitions ==
=== Preseason ===
10 July 2014	Farense (Portugal)	2–0	Luton Town	Estádio de São Luís, Faro
18:00 BST	Ernest 22'; Márcio Madeira 89' (pen.)	Report

17 July 2014	Hitchin Town	0–5	Luton Town	Top Field, Hitchin
19:45 BST		Report	Whalley 13'; Wall 31', 51', 57' (pen.); Cullen 78'	Attendance: 1,454

20 July 2014	Barnet	0–2	Luton Town	The Hive Stadium, Canons Park
15:00 BST		Report	Cullen 45'; Howells 80' (pen.)	Attendance: 806; Referee: Andy Woolmer

23 July 2014	East Thurrock United	1–1	Luton Town	Rookery Hill, Corringham
19:45		Report	Wilkinson 86'

26 July 2014	Luton Town	4–0	(Belgium) Royal Antwerp	Kenilworth Road, Luton
15:00	Lacey 6'; Franks 65'; Lafayette 80'; Lawless 87'	Report		Attendance: 3,199

29 July 2014	Luton Town	2–2	Colchester United	Kenilworth Road, Luton
19:45	Cullen 27'; Guttridge 69'	Report	Connolly 30' (o.g.); Ibehre 51'	Attendance: 1,475

2 August 2014	Luton Town	1–1	Peterborough United	Kenilworth Road, Luton
15:00	Cullen 45'	Report	Assombalonga 75'	Attendance: 2, 154

=== League Two ===
==== League table ====
Pos	Team	Pld	W	D	L	GF	GA	GD	Pts	Promotion, qualification or relegation
6	Stevenage	46	20	12	14	62	54	+8	72	Qualification for League Two play-offs (Note: Four teams play for one spot and promotion to Football League One.)
7	Plymouth Argyle	46	20	11	15	55	37	+18	71	Qualification for League Two play-offs
8	Luton Town	46	19	11	16	54	44	+10	68	
9	Newport County	46	18	11	17	51	54	−3	65	
10	Exeter City	46	17	13	16	61	65	−4	64	

Updated to match(es) played on 23 May 2015. Source: BBC Sport
Rules for classification: 1) Points; 2) Goal difference; 3) Number of goals scored

==== Results summary ====
Overall								Home						Away					
Pld	W	D	L	GF	GA	GD	Pts	W	D	L	GF	GA	GD	W	D	L	GF	GA	GD
46	19	11	16	53	45	+8	68	13	4	6	37	19	+18	6	7	10	16	26	−10

Source: League 2

==== Results by Matchday ====
Round	1	2	3	4	5	6	7	8	9	10	11	12	13	14	15	16	17	18	19	20	21	22	23	24	25	26	27	28	29	30	31	32	33	34	35	36	37	38	39	40	41	42	43	44	45	46
Ground	A	H	H	A	A	H	H	A	A	H	A	H	A	H	H	A	H	A	H	A	H	A	H	H	A	A	H	A	H	H	A	A	H	A	H	A	A	H	A	H	A	H	A	H	A	H
Result	W	L	D	D	L	L	W	D	W	W	W	W	W	W	W	D	W	L	W	L	W	D	D	D	W	D	W	D	D	W	L	L	W	L	L	L	L	L	L	L	W	L	D	W	L	W
Position	6	14	14	12	18	19	18	18	13	10	7	4	4	3	1	2	1	3	2	4	3	4	4	4	4	4	4	4	5	4	4	4	4	4	5	6	6	6	8	9	9	9	8	8	8	8

A = Away; H = Home; W = Win; D = Draw; L = Loss

==== Matches ====
9 August 2014 1	Carlisle United	0–1	Luton Town	Carlisle
15:00 BST		Report	Cullen 30'; Connolly (yellow card) 63'	Stadium: Brunton Park; Attendance: 6,766; Referee: N Miller

16 August 2014 2	Luton Town	0–1	AFC Wimbledon	Luton
15:00 BST	Griffiths (yellow card) 71'	Report	Tubbs 42'; Pell (yellow card) 81'	Stadium: Kenilworth Road; Attendance: 9,101; Referee: Oliver Langford

19 August 2014 3	Luton Town	1–1	Bury	Luton
19:45	Ruddock 90+1'; Rooney (yellow card) 51'; Tyler (yellow card) 65'	Report	Rose 62' (yellow card) 65'; Mills (yellow card) 60'; Mayor (yellow card) 70'; Tutte (yellow card) 85'	Stadium: Kenilworth Road; Attendance: 7,890; Referee: Tim Robinson

23 August 2014 4	Accrington Stanley	2–2	Luton Town	Accrington
15:00	Gray 9'; Joyce 16'; Hunt (yellow card) 81'	Report	Rooney 32'; Howells 42'	Stadium: Crown Ground; Attendance: 1,562; Referee: Seb Stockbridge

30 August 2014 5	Shrewsbury Town	2–0	Luton Town	Shrewsbury
15:00	Clark 3', 70'	Report	Robinson (red card) 83'; Connolly (yellow card) 90'	Stadium: Greenhous Meadow; Attendance: 5,888; Referee: Peter Bankes

6 September 2014 6	Luton Town	0–1	Plymouth Argyle	Luton
12:15	Connolly (yellow card) 8'	Report	Blizzard 68' (yellow card) 25'; Bray (yellow card) 60'; Hartley (yellow card) 3'	Stadium: Kenilworth Road; Attendance: 7,864; Referee: Mick Russell

13 September 2014 7	Luton Town	1–0	Cheltenham Town	Luton
15:00	Cullen 8'; Guttridge (yellow card) 43'; Smith (yellow card) 84'	Report	Brown (yellow card) 24'; Taylor (yellow card) 44'; Marquis (yellow card) 90+3'	Stadium: Kenilworth Road; Attendance: 7,793; Referee: Andy D'Urso

16 September 2014 8	York City	0–0	Luton Town	York
19:45		Report		Stadium: Bootham Crescent; Attendance: 3,649; Referee: Mark Brown

20 September 2014 9	Cambridge United	0–1	Luton Town	Cambridge
15:00	Simpson (yellow card) 36'; Naylor (red card) 53'; Donaldson (yellow card) 63'; Coulson (yellow card) 81'	Report	Cullen 80' (pen.); Stevenson (yellow card) 46'; Wall (yellow card) 55'; Lafayette (yellow card) 59'	Stadium: Abbey Stadium; Attendance: 6,533; Referee: Graham Salisbury

27 September 2014 10	Luton Town	2–0	Oxford United	Luton
15:00	Wilkinson 2'; Howells 63'; McNulty (yellow card) 50'	Report	Barnett (yellow card) 63'	Stadium: Kenilworth Road; Attendance: 9,101; Referee: Mark Haywood

4 September 2014 11	Stevenage	1–2	Luton Town	Stevenage
15:00	Pett 32'; Bond (yellow card) 8'	Report	Wilkinson 9'; Wall 84'; Smith (yellow card) 62'; Benson (yellow card) 64'; Doyle (yellow card) 81'	Stadium: Broadhall Way; Attendance: 5,236; Referee: Tony Harrington

11 October 2014 12	Luton Town	2–0	Southend United	Luton
15:00	Lawless 16'; Cullen 33'; Ruddock (yellow card) 70'; Drury (yellow card) 70'	Report	Atkinson (yellow card) 26'; Thompson (yellow card) 64'; Corr (yellow card) 66'	Stadium: Kenilworth Road; Attendance: 9,238; Referee: Chris Kavanagh

18 October 2014 13	Hartlepool United	1–2	Luton Town	Hartlepool
15:00	Austin 91' (pen.); Hawkins (yellow card) 86'	Report	Cullen 39'; Stevenson 81'	Stadium: Victoria Park; Attendance: 4,225; Referee: Paul Tierney

21 October 2014 14	Luton Town	3–1	Dagenham & Redbridge	Luton
19:45	Cullen 42', 45', 68'	Report	Doidge 86'	Stadium: Kenilworth Road; Attendance: 7,746; Referee: Andy Davies

25 October 2014 15	Luton Town	1–0	Northampton Town	Luton
15:00	Guttridge 90+1'; Benson (yellow card) 76'; Wilkinson (yellow card) 84'	Report	Stevens (yellow card) 70'; Robertson (yellow card) 84'; Tozer (yellow card) 87'	Stadium: Kenilworth Road; Attendance: 10,040; Referee: Darren Sheldrake

1 November 2014 16	Exeter City	1–1	Luton Town	Exeter
15:00	Nichols 72' (pen.); Butterfield (yellow card) 83'	Report	Griffiths 3'; Doyle (yellow card) 85'	Stadium: St James Park; Attendance: 5,400; Referee: Dean Whitestone

15 November 2014 17	Luton Town	1–0	Tranmere Rovers	Luton
15:00	Miller 70'; Benson (yellow card) 85'	Report	Power (yellow card) 91+1'	Stadium: Kenilworth Road; Attendance: 9,061; Referee: Lee Collins

22 November 2014 18	Burton Albion	1–0	Luton Town	Burton-upon-Trent
15:00	Edwards 47'; Weir (yellow card) 68'	Report	Wilkinson (red card) 90+3'	Stadium: Pirelli Stadium; Attendance: 4,772; Referee: James Adcock

29 November 2014 19	Luton Town	3–0	Mansfield Town	Luton
15:00	Benson 19'; Whalley 59', 63' (yellow card) 17'	Report	Beevers (yellow card) 68'	Stadium: Kenilworth Road; Attendance: 8,418; Referee: Gavin Ward

13 December 2014 20	Morecambe	3–0	Luton Town	Morecambe
15:00	Ellison 16' (yellow card) 85'; Hughes 44'; Amond 80'; Edwards (yellow card) 30'	Report	McNulty (yellow card) 27' (yellow-red card); Lafayette (yellow card) 85'	Stadium: Globe Arena; Attendance: 2,263; Referee: Andy D'Urso

20 December 2014 21	Luton Town	3–0	Newport County	Luton
15:00	Wilkinson 5'; Rooney 51'; Howells 90+2'; Doyle (yellow card) 27'; McNulty (yellow card) 28'; Cullen (yellow card) 80'	Report		Stadium: Kenilworth Road; Attendance: 8,383; Referee: Darren Drysdale

26 December 2014 22	Wycombe Wanderers	1–1	Luton Town	High Wycombe
15:00	Cowan-Hall 2'; Mawson (yellow card) 10'; Jacobson (yellow card) 55'	Report	Smith 8'; Griffiths (yellow card) 1'; Rooney (yellow card) 12'	Stadium: Adams Park; Attendance: 7,539; Referee: Andy Woolmer

28 December 2014 23	Luton Town	1–1	Portsmouth	Luton
15:00	Rooney 12'	Report	Taylor 35'; Bean (yellow card) 68'; Westcarr (yellow card) 88'	Stadium: Kenilworth Road; Attendance: 10,071; Referee: Darren Deadman

8 January 2015 24	Luton Town	0–0	Shrewsbury Town	Luton
19:45	Wilkinson (yellow card) 39'; Smith (yellow card) 88'	Report	Knight-Percival (yellow card) 66' (yellow-red card) 69'	Stadium: Kenilworth Road; Attendance: 7,666; Referee: James Adcock

17 January 2015 25	Plymouth Argyle	0–1	Luton Town	Plymouth
15:00	Lee (yellow card) 68'	Report	Drury 22'; Doyle (yellow card) 64'; Smith (yellow card) 86'	Stadium: Home Park; Attendance: 8,420; Referee: Keith Hill

24 January 2015 26	Cheltenham Town	1–1	Luton Town	Cheltenham
15:00	Kotwica 20' (yellow card) 56'	Report	Whalley 21'; Lawless (yellow card) 83'; McNulty (yellow card) 86'; Wilkinson (yellow card) 86'	Stadium: Whaddon Road; Attendance: 3,611; Referee: Darren Handley

31 January 2015 27	Luton Town	3–2	Cambridge United	Luton
15:00	Drury 19'; Wilkinson 31'; Smith 45+2'; Whalley (yellow card) 45+1'; Doyle (yellow card) 76'	Report	Hunt 67'; Simpson 86'; Champion (yellow card) 74'	Stadium: Kenilworth Road; Attendance: 10,054; Referee: Jeremy Simpson

7 February 2015 28	Oxford United	1–1	Luton Town	Oxford
15:00	Mullins 43'; Wright (yellow card) 43'; Skarz (yellow card) 45'; Collins (yellow card) 73'; Long (yellow card) 75'	Report	Stockley 35'; McNulty (yellow card) 44'	Stadium: Kassam Stadium; Attendance: 7,541; Referee: Richard Clark

10 February 2015 29	Luton Town	2–2	York City	Luton
19:45	Cullen 65', 71'; Smith (yellow card) 84'; McNulty (red card) 86'	Report	Carson 55'; Sinclair 59'; Hyde (red card) 61'; Olejnik (yellow card) 89'; McCoy (yellow card) 90+6'	Stadium: Kenilworth Road; Attendance: 7,763; Referee: Charles Breakspear

14 February 2015 30	Luton Town	1–0	Carlisle United	Luton
15:00	Cullen 39'; Wilkinson (red card) 61'; Stockley (yellow card) 81'	Report	Archibald-Henville (yellow card) 90'	Stadium: Kenilworth Road; Attendance: 8,502; Referee: James Linington

17 February 2015 31	Mansfield Town	1–0	Luton Town	Mansfield
19:45	Bingham 32'	Report	Drury (yellow card) 90'	Stadium: Field Mill; Attendance: 2,998; Referee: Kevin Johnson

21 February 2015 32	AFC Wimbledon	3–2	Luton Town	Kingston upon Thames
15:00	Potter 28'; Bulman 42'; Connolly 90+3'; Oshilaja (yellow card) 45'	Report	Stockley 45' (yellow card) 63'; Lee 68' (yellow card) 90+1'; Drury (yellow card) 55'	Stadium: Kingsmeadow; Attendance: 4,050; Referee: Fred Graham

28 February 2015 33	Luton Town	2–0	Accrington Stanley	Luton
15:00	Stockley 41'; Guttridge 60'; Franks (yellow card) 45+2'; Lee (yellow card) 70'	Report	Atkinson (yellow card) 47'; Windass (yellow card) 84'; Crooks (yellow card) 87'	Stadium: Kenilworth Road; Attendance: 8,700; Referee: Lee Collins

3 March 2015 34	Bury	1–0	Luton Town	Bury
19:45	Soares 9'; Lowe (yellow card) 90+1'	Report	Cullen (yellow card) 73'	Stadium: Gigg Lane; Attendance: 2,915; Referee: Scott Duncan

7 March 2015 35	Luton Town	2–3	Morecambe	Luton
15:00	McGeehan (yellow card) 5' (goal) 43'; Lawless 76'; Lee (yellow card) 84'; Oduwa (yellow card) 90+3'; Wilkinson (yellow card) 90+5'	Report	Redshaw 17' (yellow card) 67'; Wilson 29' (yellow card) 63'; Wilkinson 86' (o.g.); Beeley (yellow card) 64'; Edwards (red card) 79'; Fleming (yellow card) 81'; Hughes (yellow card) 84'	Stadium: Kenilworth Road; Attendance: 8,667; Referee: Carl Berry

14 March 2015 36	Portsmouth	2–0	Luton Town	Portsmouth
15:00	Tubbs 3'; Taylor 62'; Whatmough (yellow card) 18'; Butler (yellow card) 67'	Report	Wilkinson (yellow card) 8'; Cullen (yellow card) 45+1'	Stadium: Fratton Park; Attendance: 17,149; Referee: Darren Drysdale

17 March 2015 37	Newport County	1–0	Luton Town	Newport
19:45	O'Connor 21'; Feely (yellow card) 44'	Report	McGeehan (yellow card) 42'	Stadium: Rodney Parade; Attendance: 2,536; Referee: Brendan Malone

24 March 2015 38	Luton Town	2–3	Wycombe Wanderers	Luton
19:45	Lee 7', 38'	Report	Saunders 3' (yellow card) 72'; Hayes 22' (pen.); Mawson 31'	Stadium: Prostate Cancer UK Stadium; Attendance: 8,379; Referee: David Coote

28 March 2015 39	Northampton Town	2–1	Luton Town	Northampton
15:00	Holmes 64' (pen.); Gray 86'; Moloney (yellow card) 41'	Report	Lawless 46'; Kinsella (yellow card) 11'; Benson (yellow card) 52'; Harriman (yellow card) 63'; Doyle (yellow card) 88'	Stadium: Sixfields Stadium; Attendance: 5,668; Referee: Graham Scott

3 April 2015 40	Luton Town	2–3	Exeter City	Luton
15:00	Guttridge 21'; Cullen 45+1'; Wilkinson (yellow card) 75'; McNulty (yellow card) 79'; Doyle (yellow card) 90+1'	Report	Harley 51'; Moore-Taylor 76'; Wheeler 90+5'	Stadium: Kenilworth Road; Attendance: 8,755; Referee: Robert Lewis

6 April 2015 41	Tranmere Rovers	0–1	Luton Town	Birkenhead
15:00		Report	McGeehan 80' (yellow card) 76'; McNulty (yellow card) 58'	Stadium: Prenton Park; Attendance: 6,035; Referee: Dean Whitestone

11 April 2015 42	Luton Town	0–1	Burton Albion	Luton
15:00	McNulty (yellow card) 72'	Report	Palmer 79'	Stadium: Kenilworth Road; Attendance: 8,680; Referee: Andy Madley

14 April 2015 43	Dagenham & Redbridge	0–0	Luton Town	Dagenham
19:45		Report	McNulty (yellow card) 35'; Benson (red card) 38'	Stadium: Victoria Road; Attendance: 2,461; Referee: Darren Sheldrake

18 April 2015 44	Luton Town	3–0	Hartlepool United	Luton
15:00	McGeehan 5'; Howells 15' (pen.); Griffiths 71'	Report	Austin (yellow card) 53'; Featherstone (yellow card) 90'	Stadium: Kenilworth Road; Attendance: 8,231; Referee: Gary Sutton

25 April 2015 45	Southend United	1–0	Luton Town	Southend-on-Sea
15:00	Timlin 81'; Coker (red card) 67'; Bolger (yellow card) 71'; Deegan (yellow card) 72'	Report	Wilkinson (yellow card) 42'; Doyle (yellow card) 46'	Stadium: Roots Hall; Attendance: 10,730; Referee: Iain Williamson

2 May 2015 46	Luton Town	2–0	Stevenage	Luton
15:00	Cullen 5'; Harriman (yellow card) 21' (goal) 45+2'	Report	Worley (yellow card) 6'	Stadium: Kenilworth Road; Attendance: 10,054; Referee: Nigel Miller

=== FA Cup ===
8 November 2014 First round	Luton Town	4–2	Newport County	Luton
15:00	Guttridge 40'; Benson 58'; Miller 77'; Howells 86'; Harriman (yellow card) 65'	Report	Klukowski 51'; O'Connor 64'; Minshull (yellow card) 42'; Zebroski (yellow card) 68'	Stadium: Kenilworth Road; Attendance: 3,656; Referee: Chris Sarginson

6 December 2014 Second round	Bury	1–1	Luton Town	Bury
15:00	Soares (yellow card) 24'; Nardiello 90'	Report	Cullen 51'; Howells (yellow card) 77'	Stadium: Gigg Lane; Attendance: 2,790; Referee: Nigel Miller

16 December 2014 Second round replay	Luton Town	1–0	Bury	Luton
19:45	Rooney 48'	Report	Cameron (yellow card) 67'	Stadium: Kenilworth Road; Attendance: 2,923; Referee: Oliver Langford

3 January 2014 Third round	Cambridge United	2–1	Luton Town	Cambridge
15:00	Simpson 27'; Donaldson 66'	Report	Harriman 74'; Tyler (yellow card) 27'; Miller (yellow card) 34'	Stadium: Abbey Stadium; Attendance: 7,063; Referee: Tony Harrington

=== League Cup ===
12 August 2014 First round	Luton Town	1–2	Swindon Town	Luton
19:45	Rooney 53' (pen.) (red card) 90+3'; Benson (yellow card) 33'; Franks (yellow card) 65'	Report	Smith 76' (pen.), 81'; Kasim (yellow card) 28'; Thompson (yellow card) 29'; Thompson (yellow card) 90'	Stadium: Kenilworth Road; Attendance: 4,410; Referee: Paul Tierney

=== Football League Trophy ===
7 October 2014 Round Two	Luton Town	0–1	Crawley Town	Luton
19:45	Wall (yellow card) 55'; Wilkinson (yellow card) 60'	Report	Edwards 51'	Stadium: Kenilworth Road; Attendance: 2,186; Referee: Keith Woolmer

== Statistics ==
=== Appearances ===
Source: Luton Town

No.	Pos	Player	FL2	FAC	LC	FLT	Total
1	GK	(England) Mark Tyler	31	4	1	0	36 (0)
2	CB	(England) Fraser Franks	13	3	1	0	17 (3)
3	CB	(Republic of Ireland) Danny Fitzsimons	0	0	0	0	0 (0)
4	CM	(England) Jonathan Smith	34	4	0	1	39 (0)
5	CB	(England) Steve McNulty (c)	40	2	1	1	44 (0)
6	CB	(England) Alex Lacey	18	1	0	1	20 (8)
7	CM	(Wales) Alex Lawless	15	0	0	1	16 (9)
8	CM	(England) Andy Drury	35	3	1	0	39 (5)
9	ST	(England) Paul Benson	21	1	1	1	24 (5)
10	ST	(England) Alex Wall	7	0	0	1	8 (6)
11	LB	(Wales) Jake Howells	35	4	0	1	40 (10)
12	LB	(England) Scott Griffiths	34	2	1	1	38 (0)
13	ST	(England) Mark Cullen	41	4	1	0	46 (9)
14	CB	(England) Andy Parry	0	0	0	0	0 (0)
15	RW	(England) Luke Rooney	11	1	1	0	13 (3)
16	GK	(England) Elliot Justham	14	0	0	1	15 (0)
17	CM	(England) Pelly Ruddock	16	1	1	0	18 (8)
18	ST	(England) Ross Lafayette (Note: Currently on loan at Woking)	13	0	1	0	14 (12)
19	ST	(England) Ricky Miller	12	3	0	0	15 (12)
20	RW	(England) Shaun Whalley	18	1	0	0	19 (4)
21	CM	(England) Luke Guttridge	26	1	1	1	29 (10)
22	RB	(England) Michael Harriman (Note: Currently on loan from QPR)	26	4	0	0	30 (0)
23	CM	(England) Matt Robinson	9	1	1	1	12 (4)
24	RB	(England) Curtley Williams	3	0	0	0	3 (0)
25	ST	(England) Jayden Stockley (Note: Currently on loan from AFC Bournemouth)	11	0	0	0	11 (0)
26	DM	(England) Nathan Doyle	26	3	0	1	30 (0)
27	RW	(England) Ryan Hall	3	0	0	0	4 (1)
28	CM	(England) Jim Stevenson (Note: Currently on loan at Aldershot Town)	11	1	0	0	12 (10)
29	RB	(England) Paul Connolly	4	1	1	0	6 (0)
30	CB	(England) Luke Wilkinson	41	4	1	1	47 (0)
31	RW	(England) Nathan Oduwa (Note: Currently on loan from Tottenham Hotspur)	11	0	0	0	11 (8)
33	LB	(England) Mark Onyemah	0	0	0	0	0 (0)
35	ST	(England) Charlie Walker	3	2	0	1	6 (5)
38	ST	(England) Elliot Lee (Note: Currently on loan from West Ham United)	11	0	0	0	11 (2)
39	CM	(England) Ian Rees	0	0	0	0	0 (0)
40	LB	(England) Lewis Kinsella (Note: Currently on loan from Aston Villa)	3	0	0	0	3 (1)
41	GK	(England) Craig King	0	0	0	0	0 (0)
42	GK	(England) Liam Gooch	0	0	0	0	0 (0)
50	CM	(Northern Ireland) Cameron McGeehan (Note: Currently on loan from Norwich City)	15	0	0	0	15 (2)

=== Goals ===
Source: BBC Sport

No.	Pos	Player	FL2	FAC	LC	FLT	Total
1	GK	(England) Mark Tyler	0	0	0	0	0
2	CB	(England) Fraser Franks	0	0	0	0	0
3	CB	(Republic of Ireland) Danny Fitzsimons	0	0	0	0	0
4	CM	(England) Jonathan Smith	2	0	0	0	2
5	CB	(England) Steve McNulty (c)	0	0	0	0	0
6	CB	(England) Alex Lacey	0	0	0	0	0
7	CM	(Wales) Alex Lawless	3	0	0	0	3
8	CM	(England) Andy Drury	2	0	0	0	2
9	ST	(England) Paul Benson	1	1	0	0	1
10	ST	(England) Alex Wall	1	0	0	0	1
11	LB	(Wales) Jake Howells	4	1	0	0	5
12	LB	(England) Scott Griffiths	2	0	0	0	2
13	ST	(England) Mark Cullen	13	1	0	0	14
14	CB	(England) Andy Parry	0	0	0	0	0
15	RW	(England) Luke Rooney	3	1	1	0	5
16	GK	(England) Elliot Justham	0	0	0	0	0
17	CM	(England) Pelly Ruddock	1	0	0	0	1
18	ST	(England) Ross Lafayette	0	0	0	0	0
19	ST	(England) Ricky Miller	1	1	0	0	2
20	RW	(England) Shaun Whalley	3	0	0	0	3
21	CM	(England) Luke Guttridge	3	1	0	0	4
22	RB	(England) Michael Harriman	1	1	0	0	2
23	CM	(England) Matt Robinson	0	0	0	0	0
24	RB	(England) Curtley Williams	0	0	0	0	0
25	ST	(England) Jayden Stockley	3	0	0	0	3
26	DM	(England) Nathan Doyle	0	0	0	0	0
27	RW	(England) Ryan Hall	0	0	0	0	0
28	CM	(England) Jim Stevenson	1	0	0	0	1
29	RB	(England) Paul Connolly	0	0	0	0	0
30	CB	(England) Luke Wilkinson	4	0	0	0	4
31	RW	(England) Nathan Oduwa	0	0	0	0	0
33	LB	(England) Mark Onyemah	0	0	0	0	0
35	ST	(England) Charlie Walker	0	0	0	0	0
38	ST	(England) Elliot Lee	3	0	0	0	3
39	CM	(England) Ian Rees	0	0	0	0	0
40	LB	(England) Lewis Kinsella	0	0	0	0	0
41	GK	(England) Craig King	0	0	0	0	0
42	GK	(England) Liam Gooch	0	0	0	0	0
50	CM	(Northern Ireland) Cameron McGeehan	3	0	0	0	3
TOTALS			43	7	1	0	50

=== Clean sheets ===
No.	Pos	Player	FL2	FAC	LC	FLT	Total
1	GK	(England) Mark Tyler	13	1	0	0	14
16	GK	(England) Elliot Justham	4	0	0	0	4
TOTALS			17	1	0	0	18

=== Discipline ===
No.	Pos	Player	FL2		FAC		LC		FLT		Total	
No.	Pos	Player	Yellow card	Red card	Yellow card	Red card	Yellow card	Red card	Yellow card	Red card	Yellow card	Red card
1	GK	(England) Mark Tyler	1	0	1	0	0	0	0	0	2	0
2	CB	(England) Fraser Franks	1	0	0	0	1	0	0	0	2	0
3	CB	(Republic of Ireland) Danny Fitzsimons	0	0	0	0	0	0	0	0	0	0
4	CM	(England) Jonathan Smith	6	0	0	0	0	0	0	0	6	0
5	CB	(England) Steve McNulty (c)	11	2	0	0	0	0	0	0	11	2
6	CB	(England) Alex Lacey	0	0	0	0	0	0	0	0	0	0
7	CM	(Wales) Alex Lawless	1	0	0	0	0	0	0	0	1	0
8	CM	(England) Andy Drury	3	0	0	0	0	0	0	0	3	0
9	ST	(England) Paul Benson	4	1	0	0	1	0	0	0	5	1
10	ST	(England) Alex Wall	1	0	0	0	0	0	1	0	2	0
11	LB	(Wales) Jake Howells	0	0	1	0	0	0	0	0	1	0
12	LB	(England) Scott Griffiths	2	0	0	0	0	0	0	0	2	0
13	ST	(England) Mark Cullen	3	0	0	0	0	0	0	0	3	0
14	CB	(England) Andy Parry	0	0	0	0	0	0	0	0	0	0
15	RW	(England) Luke Rooney	2	0	0	0	2	1	0	0	4	1
16	GK	(England) Elliot Justham	0	0	0	0	0	0	0	0	0	0
17	CM	(England) Pelly Ruddock	1	0	0	0	0	0	0	0	1	0
18	ST	(England) Ross Lafayette	2	0	0	0	0	0	0	0	2	0
19	ST	(England) Ricky Miller	0	0	1	0	0	0	0	0	1	0
20	RW	(England) Shaun Whalley	2	0	0	0	0	0	0	0	2	0
21	CM	(England) Luke Guttridge	1	0	0	0	0	0	0	0	1	0
22	RB	(England) Michael Harriman	2	0	1	0	0	0	0	0	3	0
23	CM	(England) Matt Robinson	0	1	0	0	0	0	0	0	0	1
24	RB	(England) Curtley Williams	0	0	0	0	0	0	0	0	0	0
25	ST	(England) Jayden Stockley	2	0	0	0	0	0	0	0	2	0
26	DM	(England) Nathan Doyle	8	0	0	0	0	0	0	0	8	0
27	RW	(England) Ryan Hall	0	0	0	0	0	0	0	0	0	0
28	CM	(England) Jim Stevenson	1	0	0	0	0	0	0	0	1	0
29	RB	(England) Paul Connolly	3	0	0	0	0	0	0	0	3	0
30	CB	(England) Luke Wilkinson	7	2	0	0	0	0	1	0	8	2
31	RW	(England) Nathan Oduwa	1	0	0	0	0	0	0	0	1	0
33	LB	(England) Mark Onyemah	0	0	0	0	0	0	0	0	0	0
35	ST	(England) Charlie Walker	0	0	0	0	0	0	0	0	0	0
38	ST	(England) Elliot Lee	3	0	0	0	0	0	0	0	3	0
39	CM	(England) Ian Rees	0	0	0	0	0	0	0	0	0	0
40	LB	(England) Lewis Kinsella	1	0	0	0	0	0	0	0	1	0
41	GK	(England) Craig King	0	0	0	0	0	0	0	0	0	0
42	GK	(England) Liam Gooch	0	0	0	0	0	0	0	0	0	0
50	CM	(Northern Ireland) Cameron McGeehan	2	0	0	0	0	0	0	0	2	0
TOTALS			54	5	4	0	4	1	2	0	64	6

=== Summary ===
Games played	52 (46 Football League Two) (4 FA Cup) (1 Football League Cup) (1 Football League Trophy)
Games won	21 (19 Football League Two) (2 FA Cup) (0 Football League Cup) (0 Football League Trophy)
Games drawn	12 (11 Football League Two) (1 FA Cup) (0 Football League Cup) (0 Football League Trophy)
Games lost	19 (16 Football League Two) (1 FA Cup) (1 Football League Cup) (1 Football League Trophy)
Goals scored	62 (54 Football League Two) (7 FA Cup) (1 Football League Cup) (0 Football League Trophy)
Goals conceded	52 (44 Football League Two) (5 FA Cup) (2 Football League Cup) (1 Football League Trophy)
Goal difference	+10 (+10 Football League Two) (+2 FA Cup) (−1 Football League Cup) (−1 Football League Trophy)
Clean sheets	18 (16 Football League Two) (1 FA Cup)
Most appearances	47 (England) Luke Wilkinson
Top scorer	14 (England) Mark Cullen

== Honours ==
=== Individuals ===
==== Players ====
No.	Pos	Player	Award	Month	Source
30	CB	(England) Luke Wilkinson	League 2 Player of the Month	September	
13	ST	(England) Mark Cullen	League 2 Player of the Month	October	
5	CB	(England) Steve McNulty	PFA Team of the Year	April	

==== Manager ====
Name	Award	Month	Source
(England) John Still	League Two Manager of the Month	October	
