= Luke Rooney (footballer) =

British footballer (born 1990)

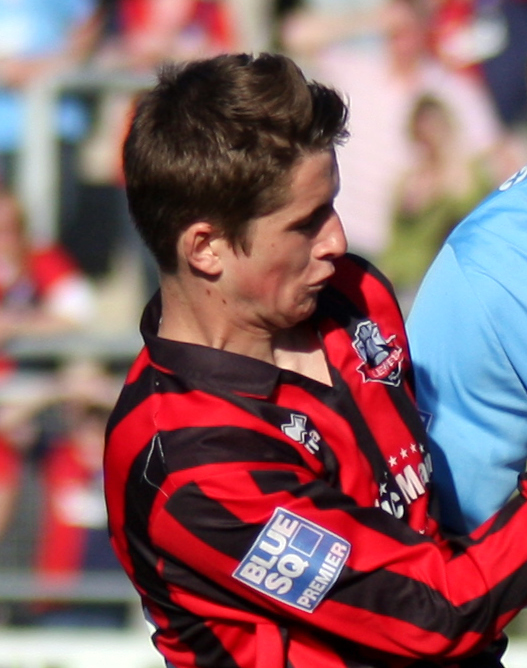
- Rooney playing for Lewes in 2009

Personal information
- Full name: Luke William Rooney
- Date of birth: 28 December 1990 (age 35)
- Place of birth: Bermondsey, England
- Height: 5 ft 8 in (1.73 m)
- Position: Winger

Team information
- Current team: Faversham Town

Youth career
- 2007–2009: Gillingham

Senior career*
Years	Team	Apps	(Gls)
2009–2012	Gillingham	53	(6)
2009	→ Lewes (loan)	6	(0)
2010	→ Eastbourne Borough (loan)	8	(2)
2010	→ Eastbourne Borough (loan)	4	(1)
2012–2013	Swindon Town	31	(2)
2012	→ Burton Albion (loan)	3	(0)
2012	→ Rotherham United (loan)	3	(0)
2013	→ Crawley Town (loan)	4	(0)
2014	Maidstone United	14	(0)
2014–2015	Luton Town	17	(3)
2015	Ebbsfleet United	6	(0)
2015–2016	Crawley Town	19	(1)
2016–2018	Phoenix Rising	29	(11)
2018	Billericay Town	5	(1)
2018–2019	Welling United	15	(0)
2019–2020	Beckenham Town	25	(6)
2020–2021	Chatham Town	16	(5)
2021–2022	Erith & Belvedere	18	(5)
2023–2024	Stansfeld	11	(2)
2024–	Faversham Town	1	(0)

Managerial career
- 2022: Erith & Belvedere (Interim)
- 2022: Glebe
- * Club domestic league appearances and goals as of 11:57, 19 August 2024 (UTC)

Luke William Rooney (born 28 December 1990) is an English footballer who plays as a midfielder for Isthmian League South East Division club Faversham Town.

== Career ==
=== Gillingham ===
Born in Bermondsey, London, Rooney joined Gillingham as an apprentice professional in 2007. He forced his way into the first team squad in early December 2008 and was an unused substitute in the FA Cup second round replay at Stockport County. In early 2009 he was loaned out to Lewes of the Conference National, where he made six appearances. He turned full-time professional with Gillingham at the start of the 2009–10 season and made his first team debut against Plymouth Argyle in the first round of the Football League Cup. His first Football League appearance was in the 3–0 home win over Exeter City on 5 September 2009, in which he scored his first ever goal for the Gillingham senior team.

On 15 March 2010, Rooney joined Conference National side Eastbourne Borough on loan until the end of that season, and made a scoring debut in the 1–1 draw with Grays Athletic. He made his senior debut as a second-half substitute in the 2–1 Football League Cup defeat of Plymouth Argyle and marked his League bow with a goal in the 3–0 win over Exeter City. Soon after he doubled his tally for the campaign with a curling strike from the right edge of the box against Southampton at St Mary's Stadium. He continued his development throughout the season, making a further 23 league appearances, either side of another loan stint at Eastbourne. The highlight of his campaign was a 25-yard drive which snatched a late point for Gillingham in the 1–1 draw with Torquay United at Plainmoor.

The midfielder made a goalscoring start to the 2011–12 campaign, netting Gillingham's second in the 3–0 defeat of Plymouth Argyle at Priestfield before scoring from the spot to clinch a point in the 1–1 draw with Accrington Stanley. His third goal of the campaign came in the 5–2 win at Torquay United in October. In total, Rooney made 20 appearances for Gillingham, scoring three times.

=== Swindon Town ===
On 6 January 2012, Swindon Town made a 'six-figure sum' offer for Rooney, which was eventually turned down by the Kent-based club. On 16 January 2012 a new undisclosed offer was made and accepted by Gillingham. On 17 January he signed a two-and-a-half-year deal with Swindon. Rooney made his Swindon debut on 21 January 2012 in a league match at home to Macclesfield Town as a substitute, coming on in the 52nd minute. He made an instant impact providing the cross for Paul Benson to head home the only goal of the game. Rooney scored his first goal for the club in the 3–0 win against promotion rivals Crawley Town. Rooney joined Crawley on loan until January 2014 on 6 August 2013. Following the completion of this loan, he joined Maidstone United on non-contract terms.

=== Luton Town ===
On 21 March 2014, Rooney joined Luton Town on a contract until the end of the 2013–14 season. He played in six games as Luton won promotion to the Football League. In July 2014, Rooney signed a six-month contract extension with Luton. After playing in 12 games, scoring five goals, Rooney's contract was extended until the end of the 2014–15 season. However, he only played in only one more game before his contract was mutually terminated in March 2015.

=== Subsequent career ===
In March 2015, Rooney joined Ebbsfleet United of the Conference South on a contract until the end of the 2014–15 season. He played in six matches before being released. Rooney signed for Crawley Town on 23 June 2015 on a free transfer on a one-year deal. On 8 March 2016, Rooney signed for Phoenix Rising FC in the USA.

On 14 February 2018, Rooney signed for Billericay Town. At the start of the following season he appeared in pre-season for Southern Counties East League league side Stansfeld. In December 2018, he joined National League South side Welling United, making his debut on 22 December in a 1–1 draw with Hemel Hempstead Town.

Following his sacking by Glebe, Rooney signed for Stansfeld in February 2023. In July 2024, he joined Faversham Town.

== Coaching career ==
Having finished the 2021–22 season as interim manager of Erith & Belvedere, Rooney was then appointed manager of Glebe.

== Honours ==
Swindon Town

- Football League Two: 2011–12

Luton Town

- Conference Premier: 2013–14
