= Fraser Franks =

English professional footballer

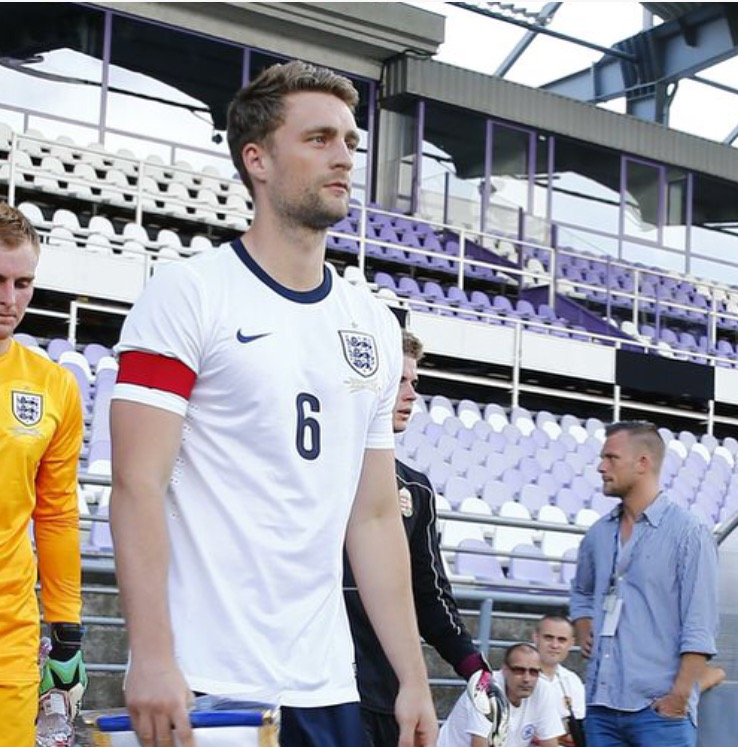
- Franks captaining England C in 2014

Personal information
- Full name: Fraser George Franks
- Date of birth: 22 November 1990 (age 35)
- Place of birth: Hammersmith, England
- Height: 6 ft 0 in (1.83 m)
- Position: Defender

Youth career
- 1999–2007: Chelsea
- 2007–2009: Brentford

Senior career*
Years	Team	Apps	(Gls)
2009–2010	Brentford	0	(0)
2009–2010	→ Basingstoke Town (loan)	13	(2)
2010–2012	AFC Wimbledon	28	(2)
2011	→ Hayes & Yeading United (loan)	7	(0)
2012	→ Newport County (loan)	1	(0)
2012–2014	Welling United	60	(4)
2014–2015	Luton Town	30	(0)
2015–2018	Stevenage	109	(7)
2018–2019	Newport County	25	(3)
Total		273	(18)

International career
2013–2014	England C	5	(1)
- * Club domestic league appearances and goals

Fraser George Franks (born 22 November 1990) is an English former professional footballer who played as a defender in the Football League for AFC Wimbledon, Luton Town, Stevenage and Newport County.

== Career ==
=== Brentford ===
Born in Hammersmith, Greater London, Franks began his career in the youth system at Chelsea at the age of 9. He then joined Brentford as an apprentice in 2007, and was named as a substitute against Swansea City in a League Cup fixture on 12 August 2008. Franks was again an unused substitute for a 2–1 FA Cup defeat away to Barrow on 28 November. He signed his first professional contract in the summer of 2009, though he remained as an unused substitute for the majority of 2009–10 and failed to make an appearance.

In September 2009, after struggling to feature for Brentford, Franks joined Conference South club Basingstoke Town on an initial one-month loan, which was later extended until January 2010. He debuted on 19 September in a 2–1 victory away to Braintree Town and scored his first goal on 24 October in a 2–1 victory at home to Weymouth. Franks' second goal came on 14 November in a 3–2 defeat away to Maidenhead United and completed the loan spell with two goals from 18 appearances. He was not offered a new contract by Brentford and was released by the club in May 2010.

=== AFC Wimbledon ===
On 29 July 2010, Franks signed a one-year contract with Conference Premier club AFC Wimbledon. He debuted as an 81st-minute substitute in a 2–1 victory away to Kettering Town on 4 September and scored his first goals in a 3–0 victory at home to Cambridge United on 29 September. Franks went on to make 28 appearances in 2010–11, though he suffered a cruciate knee ligament injury in a 2–1 defeat away to Grimsby Town on 5 March 2011. He required an operation that ruled him out of action for six months, causing him to miss the 2011 Conference Premier play-off final victory over Luton Town, and the beginning of AFC Wimbledon's first season in the Football League. Despite this, Franks had made enough appearances to trigger a one-year extension clause in his contract, keeping him at the club until the end of 2011–12.

In September 2011, Franks returned from injury and was loaned to Conference Premier club Hayes & Yeading United to gain match fitness. He debuted on 24 September in a 3–2 defeat at home to Gateshead, finishing the loan spell with seven appearances, but turned down the offer to extend the loan for a further month. Franks made his return to the AFC Wimbledon starting lineup away to Swindon Town on 8 November in a Football League Trophy tie, the match finishing 1–1 after extra time. He scored the team's only penalty in the 3–1 penalty shoot-out defeat. On 22 March 2012, Franks joined Conference Premier club Newport County on a one-month loan to play regular first-team football. He made his debut and only appearance for the club two days later in a 2–0 defeat away to Lincoln City. The remainder of his loan spell was hampered by injury. After making only five appearances for AFC Wimbledon in 2011–12, Franks was released by the club in May 2012.

=== Welling United ===
On 19 June 2012, Franks signed for Conference South club Welling United. After signing, Welling manager Jamie Day claimed Franks had turned down offers from higher leagues to be guaranteed regular first-team football. He debuted on the opening day of 2012–13 in a 1–1 draw at home to Bath City and scored his first goal in the following match, a 3–2 victory over Chelmsford City. Franks finished the season with 43 appearances and four goals, as Welling won the Conference South title and therefore promotion into the Conference Premier. He was named in the Conference South Team of the Year and signed a new one-year contract shortly afterwards. Franks made his first appearance of 2013–14 on the opening day of the season in a 2–1 defeat away to Wrexham and went on to make 29 appearances for Welling during the first half of the season.

=== Luton Town ===
On 17 January 2014, Franks signed for Conference Premier leaders Luton Town for an undisclosed fee after the club activated a release clause in his contract. Due to bad weather postponing the club's matches throughout much of the rest of January, Franks did not make his debut until 11 February against Macclesfield Town, which finished as a 2–1 victory and was named as man of the match by The Luton News. He made 18 appearances for Luton in the second half of 2013–14, as the club won the Conference Premier title and therefore promotion into League Two. Franks made his first appearance of 2014–15 on 12 August 2014 in a 2–1 defeat at home to Swindon Town in the League Cup first round. He struggled to force his way into the first-team, making just 17 appearances, as Luton finished eighth in League Two, having missed an opportunity to make an impression in the first-team in the absence of first-choice central defenders Luke Wilkinson and Steve McNulty through suspension. After the end of the season, Franks informed the club that he felt his future lay elsewhere and was transfer-listed by manager John Still, before his contract was cancelled a year early by mutual consent on 15 July 2015.

=== Stevenage ===
On 17 July 2015, Franks signed for Luton's near-neighbours Stevenage. He debuted on the opening day of 2015–16 in a 2–0 defeat at home to Notts County and scored his first goal in a 2–0 victory at home to Hartlepool United on 22 August. Franks finished the season with 42 appearances and three goals, as Stevenage finished 18th in League Two. He was named Season Ticket Holders Player of the Year, BoroChat Player of the Year and Players' Player of the Year at the club's end-of-season presentation night. Franks spent three seasons at Stevenage, making 120 appearances for the club, scoring eight goals.

=== Newport County ===
Franks re-signed for fellow League Two club Newport County on 18 June 2018 on a two-year contract. He made his debut on the opening day of the 2018–19 season, starting in the club's 3–0 away defeat to Mansfield Town. Franks scored his first goal for Newport in a 3–2 home win over Notts County on 21 August. He captained Newport in a 2–1 victory at home to Premier League team Leicester City in the FA Cup third round on 6 January 2019.

Franks retired from playing on 21 March 2019, as a result of a heart issue. Franks had made 34 appearances and scored three goals for Newport up to that point in 2018–19. Franks had heart palpitations and chest pains, and had to be taken to hospital by his pregnant wife.

== International career ==
In June 2013, Franks was selected for the England national C team and won his first cap in a 6–1 victory over Bermuda. On 19 November 2013, Franks scored his first international goal in a 2–2 draw with Czech Republic U21, a match in which he also captained the team for the first time. Franks went on to earn five caps for the England C team, captaining the side four times, before becoming ineligible due to Luton Town's promotion to the Football League.

== Personal life ==
Frank married former S Club Juniors singer Stacey McClean in 2017. They split in 2023, followed by a divorce in 2024. They share a daughter, Nellie, born in 2019.

Franks struggled with alcohol following his premature retirement from football, but following counselling from the Sporting Chance Clinic, became sober on 1 August 2021. Franks is an ambassador for Alcohol Change UK and together with lawyer Matt Himsworth, runs mentoring firm B5 Consultancy.

== Career statistics ==
Appearances and goals by club, season and competition
Club	Season	League			FA Cup		League Cup		Other		Total	
Club	Season	Division	Apps	Goals	Apps	Goals	Apps	Goals	Apps	Goals	Apps	Goals
Brentford	2008–09	League Two	0	0	0	0	0	0	0	0	0	0
Brentford	2009–10	League One	0	0	0	0	0	0	0	0	0	0
Brentford	Total		0	0	0	0	0	0	0	0	0	0
Basingstoke Town (loan)	2009–10	Conference South	13	2	2	0	—		3 (Note: Two appearances in Hampshire Senior Cup, one in FA Trophy)	0	18	2
AFC Wimbledon	2010–11	Conference Premier	24	2	2	0	—		2 (Note: Appearances in FA Trophy)	0	28	2
AFC Wimbledon	2011–12	League Two	4	0	0	0	0	0	1 (Note: Appearance in Football League Trophy)	0	5	0
AFC Wimbledon	Total		28	2	2	0	0	0	3	0	33	2
Hayes & Yeading United (loan)	2011–12	Conference Premier	7	0	—		—		—		7	0
Newport County (loan)	2011–12	Conference Premier	1	0	—		—		—		1	0
Welling United	2012–13	Conference South	34	4	5	0	—		4	0	43	4
Welling United	2013–14	Conference Premier	26	0	3	0	—		0	0	29	0
Welling United	Total		60	4	8	0	—		4	0	72	4
Luton Town	2013–14	Conference Premier	17	0	0	0	—		1 (Note: Appearance in Bedfordshire Senior Cup)	0	18	0
Luton Town	2014–15	League Two	13	0	3	0	1	0	0	0	17	0
Luton Town	Total		30	0	3	0	1	0	1	0	35	0
Stevenage	2015–16	League Two	38	3	2	0	1	0	1	0	42	3
Stevenage	2016–17	League Two	41	3	1	0	2	0	2 (Note: Appearances in EFL Trophy)	1	46	4
Stevenage	2017–18	League Two	30	1	1	0	1	0	0	0	32	1
Stevenage	Total		109	7	4	0	4	0	3	1	120	8
Newport County	2018–19	League Two	25	3	5	0	2	0	2	0	34	3
Career total			273	18	24	0	7	0	16	1	320	19

== Honours ==
AFC Wimbledon

- Conference Premier play-offs: 2010–11

Welling United

- Conference South: 2012–13

Luton Town

- Conference Premier: 2013–14

Individual

- Conference South Team of the Year: 2012–13
- Stevenage Player of the Year: 2015–16
