= Charlie Walker (footballer, born 1990) =

British association football player

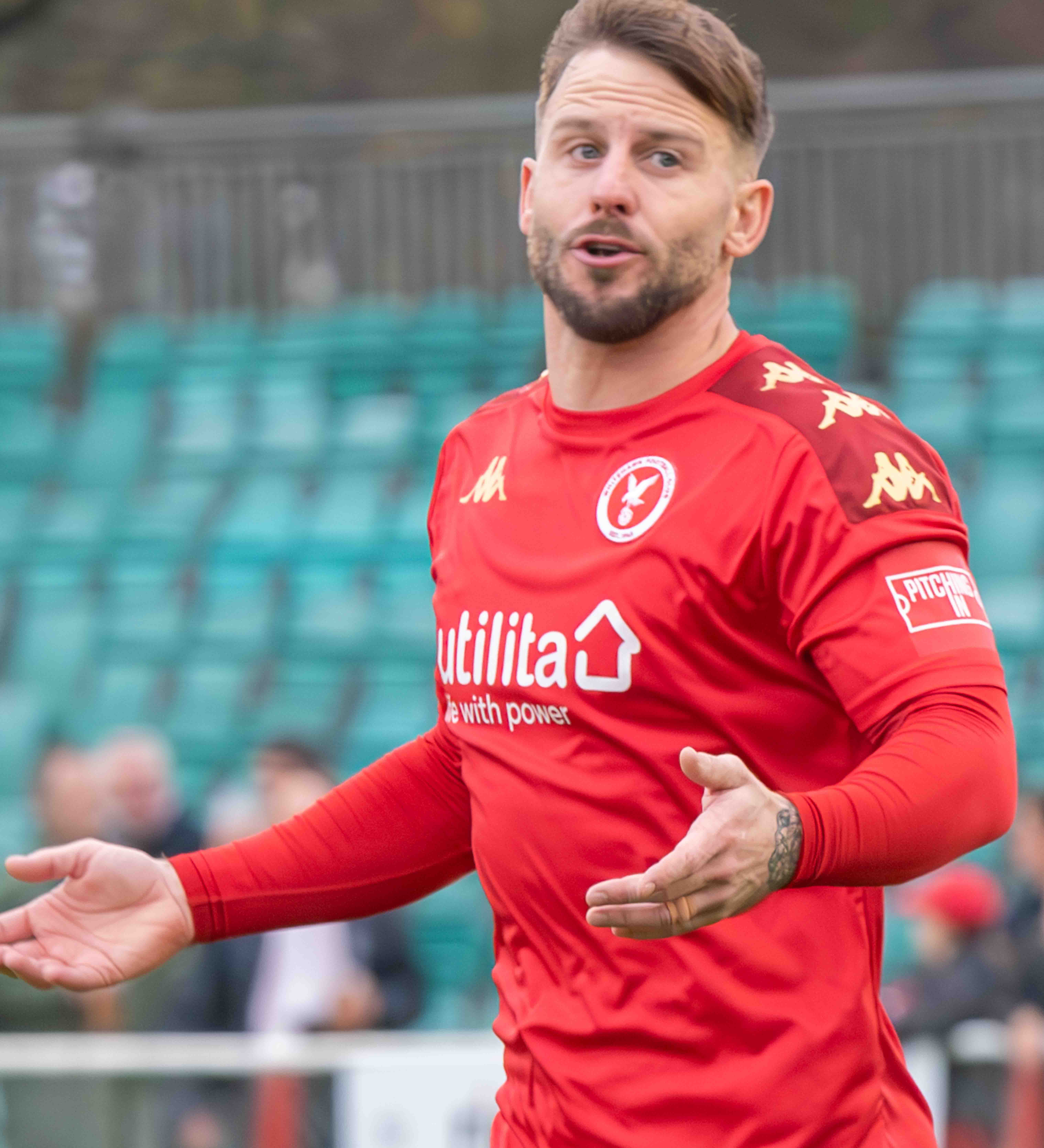
- Whitehawk forward Charlie Walker playing against Lewes in November 2023

Personal information
- Full name: Charlie Walker
- Date of birth: 8 March 1990 (age 36)
- Place of birth: Brighton, England
- Height: 5 ft 10 in (1.78 m)
- Position: Striker

Team information
- Current team: Lewes

Senior career*
Years	Team	Apps	(Gls)
2010–2011	Shoreham	33	(25)
2011–2012	Lancing	19	(21)
2012–2013	Whitehawk	7	(3)
2013–2014	Peacehaven & Telscombe	32	(27)
2014–2015	Luton Town	3	(0)
2015	→ Boreham Wood (loan)	9	(1)
2015–2016	Aldershot Town	53	(16)
2017–2018	St Albans City	55	(14)
2018–2023	Eastbourne Borough	150	(42)
2023–2025	Whitehawk	74	(21)
2025–	Lewes		
- * Club domestic league appearances and goals as of 12:38, 14 August 2025 (UTC)

Charlie Walker (born 8 March 1990) is an English semi-professional footballer who plays as a striker for Isthmian League Premier Division club Lewes.

== Career ==
=== Early career ===
Walker was born in Brighton, East Sussex. In 2009–2010 he was playing parks football for Orb360 in Division 2 of the Brighton, Hove & District League in a side managed by his friend's father. Having scored 120 goals in three seasons, he was spotted by Matt Major, the Chairman of Sussex County League Division One side Shoreham. After scoring 15 goals in his second season with Shoreham by December 2011, Walker signed for Lancing in the same division and the following month signed dual registration terms with Isthmian League Division One South club Whitehawk making one appearance from the bench before returning to Culver Road, where his 21 goals helped Lancing finish second in Sussex County League Division One.

In 2011–2012 he made 10 league and cup appearances, scoring six times for Whitehawk as they won the Isthmian League Premier Division. At the end of the season he signed for neighbours Peacehaven & Telscombe, and finished 2013–14 with 43 league and cup goals, as the club won the Isthmian League Division One South title and the Sussex Senior Challenge Cup.

=== Luton Town ===
Walker signed for League Two club Luton Town from Peacehaven & Telscombe on 19 July 2014, after being recommended by his former Whitehawk manager Darren Freeman. He debuted in a 2–1 win away to Stevenage on 4 October and made five further appearances for the club. However, it was announced in May 2015 that Walker's contract would not be renewed.

==== Loan to Boreham Wood ====
On 20 February 2015, Walker signed for Conference South club Boreham Wood on loan until the end of 2014–15. He scored on his debut a day later with the fourth goal in a 4–1 victory away to Weston-super-Mare. Walker completed the loan spell with one goal from 13 appearances, as the club won promotion to the National League for the first time in their history with a 2–1 victory over his former club Whitehawk in the Conference South play-off final after extra time, in which he was introduced as a substitute for Junior Morais.

=== Aldershot Town ===
On 19 June 2015, Walker signed for National League club Aldershot Town on a one-year contract. He debuted on the opening day of 2015–16 in a 2–1 defeat at home to Gateshead and scored his first goal on 29 August in a 2–1 defeat at home to Eastleigh. Walker then scored five goals in four appearances in September to help Aldershot win four out of five matches. A further three goals in five appearances in October took his tally for the season to nine goals. Walker finished his first season at Aldershot as the club's top scorer with 14 goals from 44 appearances, as they finished 15th in the National League. After the end of the season, he signed a new one-year contract.

Walker suffered ankle ligament damage in pre-season ahead of 2016–17, which kept him out for six weeks. He made his first appearance of the season after being introduced as a 71st-minute substitute in a 1–1 draw away to former loan club Boreham Wood on 13 September 2016. His first goal of the season came with the third goal in a 3–0 win at home to Gateshead on 24 September. However, Walker made only four starts for Aldershot and was released by mutual consent on 21 December to find a club where he would play regularly in the first-team.

=== St Albans City ===
Walker signed for National League South club St Albans City on a one-and-a-half-year contract on 4 January 2017. After signing, assistant manager Lee Allinson said "He's the all-round striker. Strong, fast, can score great goals and on his day is pretty much unplayable." He debuted three days later in a 2–2 draw at home to Maidenhead United.

=== Eastbourne Borough ===
Walker signed for fellow National League South club Eastbourne Borough on 5 June 2018.

=== Return to Whitehawk ===
On 3 July 2023, Walker returned to Isthmian League Premier Division club Whitehawk following his release from Eastbourne Borough to be reunited with his manager Shaun Saunders from his earlier days at Peacehaven & Telscombe. Walker was appointed first team captain for the 2024–2025 season, under new manager Ross McNeilly.

=== Lewes ===
Walker joined Lewes in August 2025.

== Personal life ==
Prior to becoming a professional footballer with Luton Town, Walker was a self-employed builder.

== Career statistics ==
As of match played 29 April 2023

Appearances and goals by club, season and competition
Club	Season	League			FA Cup		League Cup		Other		Total	
Club	Season	Division	Apps	Goals	Apps	Goals	Apps	Goals	Apps	Goals	Apps	Goals
Luton Town	2014–15	League Two	3	0	2	0	0	0	1 (Note: Appearance in Football League Trophy)	0	6	0
Boreham Wood (loan)	2014–15	Conference South	9	1	0	0	—		4 (Note: Two appearances in Herts Senior Cup, two in Conference South play-offs)	0	13	1
Aldershot Town	2015–16	National League	40	14	3	0	—		1 (Note: Appearance(s) in FA Trophy)	0	44	14
Aldershot Town	2016–17	National League	13	2	1	0	—		1	1	15	3
Aldershot Town	Total		53	16	4	0	—		2	1	59	17
St Albans City	2016–17	National League South	18	7	—		—		2 (Note: One appearance in Herts Senior Cup, one in Herts Charity Cup)	0	20	7
St Albans City	2017–18	National League South	37	7	3	1	—		7 (Note: One appearance in Herts Charity Cup, two appearances and one goal in Herts Senior Cup, four appearances in FA Trophy)	1	47	9
St Albans City	Total		55	14	3	1	—		9	1	67	16
Eastbourne Borough	2018–19	National League South	35	11	3	0	—		6 (Note: Three appearances and one goal in Sussex Senior Challenge Cup, three appearances in FA Trophy)	1	44	12
Eastbourne Borough	2019–20	National League South	29	7	1	0	—		5 (Note: Two appearances and three goals in Sussex Senior Challenge Cup, three appearances and two goals in FA Trophy)	5	35	12
Eastbourne Borough	2020–21	National League South	16	6	4	0	—		1	0	21	6
Eastbourne Borough	2021–22	National League South	34	9	3	2	—		3 (Note: Two appearances in FA Trophy, one appearance in National League South play-offs)	2	40	13
Eastbourne Borough	2022–23	National League South	36	9	1	0	—		3 (Note: Two appearances in FA Trophy, one appearance in Sussex Senior Challenge Cup)	0	40	9
Eastbourne Borough	Total		150	42	12	2	—		18	8	180	52
Career total			270	73	21	3	0	0	34	10	325	86

== Honours ==
Whitehawk

- Isthmian League South Division: 2011-12
- Isthmian League Premier Division: 2012-13

Peacehaven & Telscombe

- Sussex Senior Challenge Cup: 2013–14
- Isthmian League Division One South: 2013–14

Boreham Wood

- Conference South play-offs: 2014–15
