= Alex Wall =

English footballer (born 1990)

Personal information
- Full name: Alexander David Wall
- Date of birth: 22 September 1990 (age 36)
- Place of birth: Thatcham, England
- Height: 6 ft 3 in (1.91 m)
- Position: Striker

Team information
- Current team: Potters Bar Town

Youth career
- –2008: Thatcham Town

Senior career*
Years	Team	Apps	(Gls)
2008–2009	Thatcham Town	1	(1)
2009–2013	Maidenhead United	127	(34)
2013	→ Luton Town (loan)	12	(2)
2013–2015	Luton Town	17	(4)
2014	→ Dartford (loan)	11	(6)
2014–2015	→ Bristol Rovers (loan)	5	(0)
2015–2017	Bromley	18	(3)
2017–2018	Hungerford Town	14	(1)
2018	Dartford	0	(0)
2018–2019	Concord Rangers	33	(21)
2019–2020	Hemel Hempstead Town	11	(0)
2020	Woking	7	(1)
2020–2021	Concord Rangers	11	(7)
2021–2022	Havant & Waterlooville	23	(4)
2022–2024	Dartford	55	(15)
2024–2025	Hampton & Richmond Borough	24	(2)
2025–2026	St Albans City	38	(4)
2026	Whitstable Town	5	(2)
2026–	Potters Bar Town	8	(6)
- * Club domestic league appearances and goals as of 21:04, 30 September 2026 (UTC)

Alexander David Wall (born 22 September 1990) is an English semi-professional footballer who plays as a striker for Southern League Division One Central club Potters Bar Town.

== Career ==
=== Thatcham Town ===
Born in Thatcham, Berkshire, Wall began his career at hometown club Thatcham Town. He was part of the club's under-18 team that won the 2007–08 Football Conference Youth Alliance championship, beating Ebbsfleet United under-18's 4–2 in the final.

He worked his way into the club's first-team at the age of 18, entering play as a substitute and scoring on his debut in a 6–1 win over Andover on 11 April 2009.

=== Maidenhead United ===
Wall's progress through Thatcham's youth team was noticed by nearby Conference South side Maidenhead United, who signed him in the summer of 2009. In his first season at the club, Wall was primarily used as an impact substitute, and he scored an injury-time winner in Maidenhead's 3–2 victory over local rivals Basingstoke Town on 14 November 2009 after coming off the bench. In total, Wall scored 10 goals in 41 appearances in all competitions during the 2009–10 season, with seven of these goals coming from appearances off the bench.

Wall played fewer games in the 2010–11 season, scoring only three league goals, but his performances led to interest from Football League clubs. In July 2011, he went on trial with League One side Notts County, though a proposed transfer fell through despite a fee having been agreed between the two clubs. Maidenhead manager Johnson Hippolyte admitted Wall was "devastated" that Notts County pulled out of the deal. He signed a new contract with Maidenhead and went on to play in 35 matches during the 2011–12 season, scoring nine league goals as the club finished in mid-table.

Wall had his most successful season during the 2012–13 campaign, scoring at a rate of almost a goal every two games with 13 goals in 27 league matches. He won the Conference South Player of the Month award for February 2013 after scoring five goals in five matches.

=== Luton Town ===
Wall signed for Conference Premier side Luton Town on loan from Maidenhead on 1 March 2013, with a view to a permanent transfer taking place later in the year. He became the first signing of new Luton manager John Still, who had previously scouted and taken him on trial while managing Dagenham & Redbridge in League Two. Wall scored his first goals for Luton with a brace in a 2–0 win over Ebbsfleet United on 18 April 2013. After impressing in his loan spell, he signed a permanent two-year contract with Luton a week later.

Wall was given the number 10 shirt for Luton's 2013–14 season, but initially struggled to adapt to full-time football, picking up a succession of injuries that kept him from breaking into the first-team. In a 2–0 defeat to Wrexham on 13 September 2013, Wall received a red card for a dangerous tackle only a few minutes after entering play as a substitute. He was banned for three games, but scored upon his return to the team, also as a substitute, hitting a late 25-yard winning goal in a dramatic 4–3 victory over FC Halifax Town on 5 October 2013. Further injuries persisted, though Wall did take part in Luton's FA Trophy games, scoring in a 2–2 draw with Cambridge United on 11 January 2014.

With his game time limited due to the goalscoring form of Paul Benson and Andre Gray, Luton loaned Wall to fellow Conference side Dartford for one month on 17 January 2014. His presence had an immediate impact as Dartford picked up 10 points from a possible 12 with Wall in the team, leading to his loan being extended for another month. Luton allowed Dartford to extend Wall's loan for a further month in mid-March, but opted to recall him only a few weeks later after he had scored six goals in 11 games. Wall played a part in Luton's final four games of the 2013–14 season, scoring twice, as the club won the Conference Premier title and promotion to the Football League with a club-record 101 points.

Wall's playing time was limited during the 2014–15 season, though he did score a late winning goal in a local derby with Stevenage, and he was sent on loan to Conference Premier side Bristol Rovers in November 2014. He returned to Luton just over a month later, but featured in only a handful of games. In May 2015 it was announced that Wall's contract would not be renewed.

=== Bromley ===
On 1 June 2015, Wall signed for newly promoted National League team Bromley. He scored on his league debut for the Ravens as they beat Wrexham 3–1 on the opening day of the 2015–16 season. Wall was released from his contract at Bromley in January 2017 after suffering numerous injuries.

=== Hungerford Town ===
Wall signed for Hungerford Town for the 2017–18 season.

=== Dartford (second spell) ===
On 20 June 2018, Wall signed for Dartford. However, on 31 July – just four days before the start of the 2018/19 season – it was announced that Wall had left the club.

=== Concord Rangers (first spell) ===
On 1 August 2018, Wall – having been released by Dartford the previous day – signed for fellow National League South side Concord Rangers. Wall spent one season with Concord, where he scored 21 goals in 34 games.

=== Hemel Hempstead Town ===
Wall followed departed Concord manager Sammy Moore to Hemel Hempstead Town for the 2019–20 season. Wall did not have the best of times at Hemel Hempstead and it was announced on 10 January 2020 that the club agreed to terminate his contract.

=== Woking ===
On 14 January 2020, it was announced that Wall would be joining National League Woking for the remainder of the 2019–20 season.

=== Concord Rangers (second spell) ===
On 21 June 2020, Wall decided to return to his former club Concord Rangers for the 2020–21 season. Wall made his first start back with Concord in the FA Trophy semi-final against Halesowen, where he scored an 80th-minute winner in a 2–1 victory to send Concord to Wembley for the first time in their history.

=== Havant & Waterlooville ===
Wall joined Havant & Waterlooville for the 2021–22 season. He was released at the end of the season.

=== Dartford (third spell) ===
On 25 June 2022, Wall signed again for Dartford.

On 30 April 2024, it was announced the Wall would leave Dartford following the expiration of his contract.

=== Hampton & Richmond Borough ===
On 27 May 2024, Wall signed for Hampton & Richmond Borough.

=== St Albans City ===
On 15 March 2025, Wall signed for St Albans City.

=== Whitstable Town ===
In June 2026, Wall joined newly promoted Isthmian League South East Division club Whitstable Town.

=== Potters Bar Town ===
On 26 September 2026, Wall joined Isthmian League North Division club Potters Bar Town.

== Career statistics ==
As of end of 2024–25 season

Appearances and goals by club, season and competition
Club	Season	League			FA Cup		League Cup		Other		Total	
Club	Season	Division	Apps	Goals	Apps	Goals	Apps	Goals	Apps	Goals	Apps	Goals
Thatcham Town	2008–09	Southern League Division One South & West	1	1	0	0	—		0	0	1	1
Maidenhead United	2009–10	Conference South	37	9	1	1	—		3 (Note: Appearance(s) in FA Trophy)	0	41	10
Maidenhead United	2010–11	Conference South	31	3	3	3	—		1	0	35	6
Maidenhead United	2011–12	Conference South	32	9	3	0	—		3	0	38	9
Maidenhead United	2012–13	Conference South	27	13	2	0	—		1	0	30	13
Maidenhead United	Total		127	34	9	4	—		8	0	144	38
Luton Town (loan)	2012–13	Conference Premier	12	2	—		—		—		12	2
Luton Town	2013–14	Conference Premier	10	3	0	0	—		5	1	15	4
Luton Town	2014–15	League Two	7	1	0	0	0	0	1 (Note: Appearance in Football League Trophy)	0	8	1
Luton Town	Total		29	6	0	0	0	0	6	1	35	7
Dartford (loan)	2013–14	Conference Premier	11	6	—		—		—		11	6
Bristol Rovers (loan)	2014–15	Conference Premier	5	0	—		—		1	0	6	0
Bromley	2015–16	National League	18	3	0	0	—		1	0	19	3
Bromley	2016–17	National League	0	0	0	0	—		0	0	0	0
Bromley	Total		18	3	0	0	0	0	1	0	19	3
Hungerford Town	2017–18	National League South	14	1	0	0	—		0	0	14	1
Dartford	2018–19	National League South	0	0	0	0	—		0	0	0	0
Concord Rangers	2018–19	National League South	33	21	1	0	—		0	0	34	21
Hemel Hempstead Town	2019–20	National League South	11	0	0	0	—		1	0	12	0
Woking	2019–20	National League	7	1	—		—		—		7	1
Concord Rangers	2019–20	National League South	—		—		—		1	1	1	1
Concord Rangers	2020–21	National League South	11	7	4	2	—		3	1	18	10
Concord Rangers	Total		11	7	4	2	—		4	2	19	11
Havant & Waterlooville	2021–22	National League South	23	4	2	1	—		0	0	25	5
Dartford	2022–23	National League South	31	11	0	0	—		3 (Note: Two appearances in the London Senior Cup) (Note: One appearance in the Kent Senior Cup)	1	34	12
Dartford	2023–24	National League South	24	4	1	0	—		4 (Note: One appearance in the FA Trophy) (Note: Three appearances in the Kent Senior Cup)	1	29	5
Dartford	Total		55	15	1	0	—		7	2	63	17
Hampton & Richmond Borough	2024–25	National League South	24	2	1	0	—		4 (Note: Three appearances and one goal in the FA Trophy and one appearance in the Middlesex Senior Cup)	1	29	3
St Albans City	2024–25	National League South	8	1	—		—		—		8	1
Career total			377	102	18	7	0	0	32	6	427	115

== Honours ==
Luton Town

- Conference Premier: 2013–14

Concord Rangers

- FA Trophy runner-up: 2019–20

Individual

- Conference South Player of the Month: February 2013
