= Alex Lacey =

English footballer

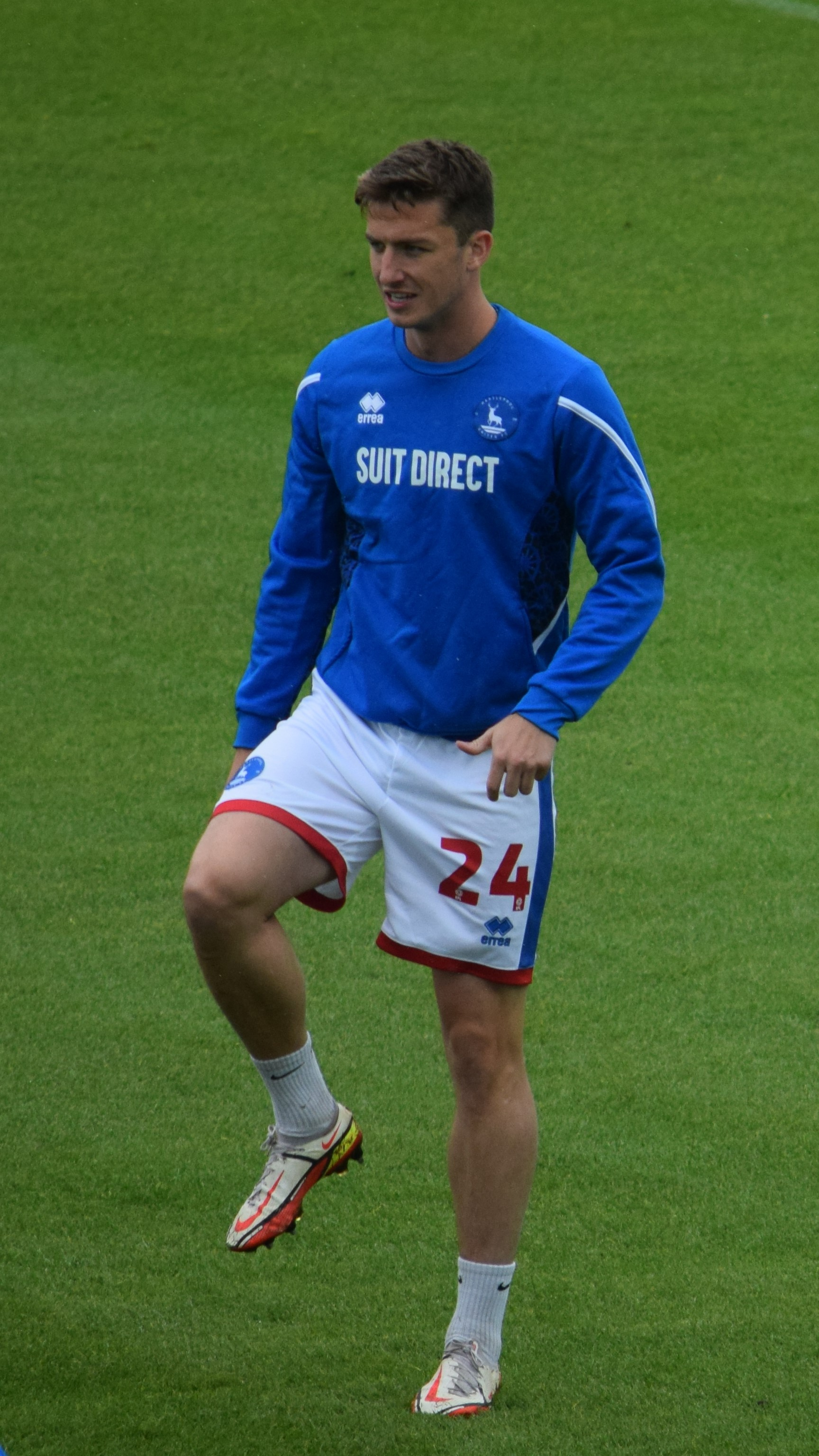
- Lacey warming up for Hartlepool United in 2022

Personal information
- Full name: Alexander Lawrence Lacey
- Date of birth: 31 May 1993 (age 33)
- Place of birth: Milton Keynes, England
- Position: Central defender

Youth career
- 2007–2010: Luton Town

Senior career*
Years	Team	Apps	(Gls)
2010–2015	Luton Town	40	(1)
2011	→ Cambridge City (loan)	12	(0)
2011	→ Thurrock (loan)	3	(0)
2012	→ Eastbourne Borough (loan)	14	(2)
2013	→ Eastleigh (loan)	18	(1)
2015–2017	Yeovil Town	60	(3)
2017–2019	Gillingham	27	(2)
2019–2022	Notts County	59	(6)
2022–2024	Hartlepool United	31	(2)
2025	Bohemians	1	(0)
- * Club domestic league appearances and goals as of 14:27, 5 November 2025 (UTC)

Alexander Lawrence Lacey (born 31 May 1993) is an English footballer who plays as a central defender, most recently for League of Ireland Premier Division club Bohemians.

Lacey began his career with Luton Town, signing his first professional contract in November 2010. He subsequently had spells on loan with Cambridge City, Thurrock, Eastbourne Borough and Eastleigh. Returning to the first team, Lacey was named as Luton's captain ahead of the 2013–14 season. Lacey earned promotion to the Football League with Luton that season before leaving in 2015 for Yeovil Town. He would spend two seasons with Yeovil, but left in 2017 to sign for Gillingham. After two seasons with Gillingham, Lacey signed for non-League club Notts County. He left Notts County in 2022, signing for Hartlepool United.

== Career ==
=== Luton Town ===
Born in Milton Keynes, Buckinghamshire, Lacey joined the Luton Town youth set-up as a first-year scholar in 2007. As a 16-year-old, he was an unused substitute during Luton's narrow 1–0 defeat to League One side Southampton in the FA Cup in January 2010.

He signed a professional contract with Luton in November 2010 and made his first-team debut a month later, starting against Welling United in a 0–0 draw in the FA Trophy. He made two further starts in the club's FA Trophy campaign, which culminated in Luton being defeated in the semi-final to Mansfield Town. Lacey made his league debut as a substitute on 30 April 2011 in a 1–1 draw against Wrexham.

He played the full 90 minutes of a pre-season friendly in July 2011 against Southern League Premier Division side Cambridge City, with his display in defence described as "impeccable" and "assured". Lacey's performance was not overlooked by Cambridge City, who subsequently signed him on loan for an initial month, alongside fellow Luton youth player JJ O'Donnell, on 12 August 2011. This loan was later extended until October. Lacey returned to Luton having made 14 appearances, and then joined Conference South side Thurrock on loan for a month in November. He played three times in this loan period, and then played in three FA Trophy games upon his return to Luton. He was sent to Eastbourne Borough on loan for the final two months of the 2011–12 season, making 14 appearances and scoring two goals as he helped the club narrowly avoid relegation. Lacey was linked with moves to Championship sides Southampton and Burnley, but signed a new two-year contract with Luton in June 2012.

Injuries prevented Lacey from breaking into the Luton first-team at the beginning of the 2012–13 season and, when fit, manager Paul Buckle preferred to use the loan market for young defenders, bringing in Connor Essam and Simon Ainge. Lacey joined Conference South side Eastleigh in January 2013 on a one-month loan that was later extended until the end of the season. He played in both legs of Eastleigh's play-off semi-final in April 2013, which ended in a penalty shoot-out defeat to Dover Athletic. He returned to Luton having played in 20 games, scoring once, and was praised for his performances both at centre-back and right-back.

Paul Buckle had been replaced at Luton by experienced manager John Still towards the end of the 2012–13 season. Still named Lacey as Luton's captain during their 2013–14 pre-season games to improve his communication skills. On the opening day of the 2013–14 season, an injury to regular captain Ronnie Henry and a red card for vice-captain Steve McNulty meant that Lacey, at the age of 20, had the unusual distinction of captaining Luton on his first league start for the club; a 1–0 defeat to Southport. Lacey played in central defence in Luton's opening six games of the 2013–14 season, during which the team kept four clean sheets. He scored his first goal for the club in a 4–0 win against Woking on 25 September 2013 and remained in the starting XI as Luton embarked on a club-record 27 league game unbeaten run. He fractured a metatarsal in a 3–0 win against Southport in November 2013, which sidelined him for three months. By the time Lacey had recovered, he had been replaced in central defence by Fraser Franks. With his Luton contract set to expire at the end of the season, Lacey was linked with potential moves to Bournemouth, Charlton Athletic, Millwall and Peterborough United. However, on 3 April 2014, Lacey signed a two-year contract extension with Luton. Luton won the Conference Premier title during the 2013–14 season, with Lacey playing in a total of 21 league games.

He made his Football League debut on the opening day of the 2014–15 season, playing in a new position as a defensive midfielder as Luton beat Carlisle United 1–0. He played in a total of 20 matches throughout the campaign, often as a substitute, and was placed on the transfer list at the end of the season.

=== Yeovil Town ===
On 22 July 2015, Lacey joined League Two side Yeovil Town on a free transfer, signing a two-year deal. He scored his first goal for Yeovil in an EFL Trophy match against Milton Keynes Dons on 6 December 2016. Lacey also scored in three League Two ties; a 2–1 home win against Plymouth Argyle, a 3–1 away win at Morecambe and a 3–3 draw away at Exeter City. He was a near ever-present in his second season at the club, featuring in 47 games in all competitions.

At the conclusion of the 2016–17 season, Lacey was awarded with the Green & White Supporters Club and Community Sports Trust Player of the Season trophies. In total, Lacey played 72 times during his two-year spell at Yeovil Town.

=== Gillingham ===
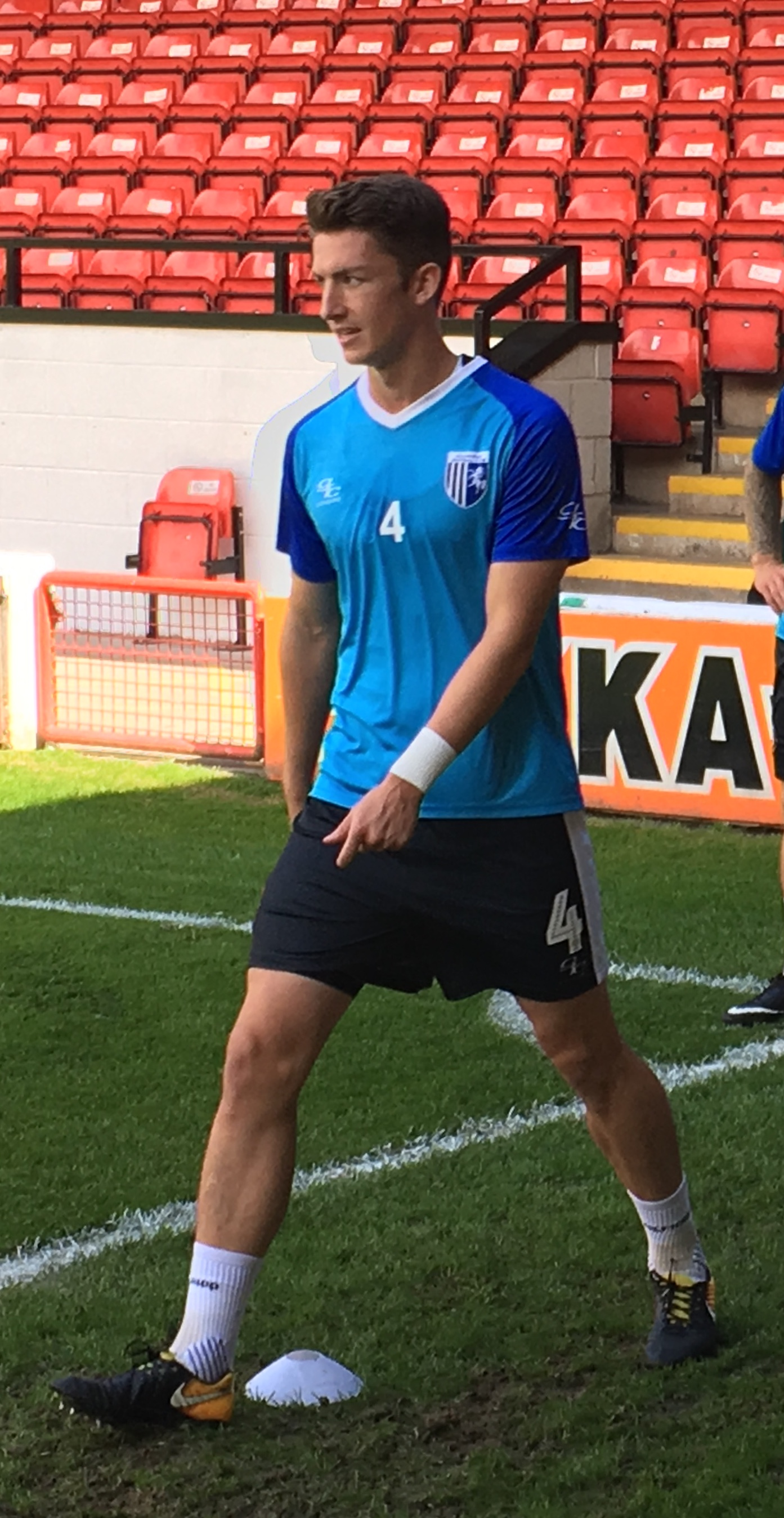
Lacey warming up for Gillingham

At the end of the 2016–17 season, Lacey rejected Yeovil's offer of a new contract, instead signing a two-year deal at League One side Gillingham under manager Adrian Pennock. He became Peter Taylor's first signing in his role as Director of Football at the club.

Although a series of injuries restricted Lacey's playing time in his first season at the club, his second season was more successful. Highlights included keeping a clean sheet in an early 0-0 draw away at Championship side Millwall's New Den in the League Cup (losing 3–1 on penalties after extra time), a pair of 2–0 wins over League One leaders Portsmouth (scoring the second in the away fixture at Fratton Park) as well as a notable performance in a televised 1–0 home victory over Premier League club Cardiff City in the third round of the FA Cup. However, playing time was again fairly limited thereafter, with his final appearance for Gillingham coming as a second-half substitute in a 3–0 away win at Blackpool on the last day of the season.

Lacey left Gillingham upon the expiry of his contract after the conclusion of the 2018–19 season.

=== Notts County ===
On 7 November 2019, Lacey joined National League side Notts County until the end of the 2019–20 season. After a brief pre-season, Lacey broke into the first team in December, making his début in a 4–2 away win at FC Halifax Town. County suffered just two defeats in the following twelve league games, keeping seven clean sheets in the process, culminating in a 4–0 televised defeat of Eastleigh in what was considered 'the biggest match in England' due to the postponement of both the Football League and Premier League. With the club in 3rd place, the season ultimately postponed due to the COVID-19 pandemic and the final table decided on a points-per-game basis, Notts County beat Barnet 2–0 in their play-off semi-final at Meadow Lane before losing 3–1 to Harrogate Town in the play-off final at Wembley, with Lacey playing the full 90 minutes in both matches.

Despite interest from clubs in higher tiers, Lacey opted to extend his contract on 11 August 2020.

Following defeat in the play-offs eliminator, Lacey was released at the end of the 2021–22 season.

=== Hartlepool United ===
On 24 June 2022, Lacey signed for League Two side Hartlepool United. At the end of the 2023–24 season it was confirmed that he would be released from his contract.

=== Bohemians ===
On 4 February 2025, Lacey signed for League of Ireland Premier Division side Bohemians. He made just one appearance during an injury-hampered season with the club before being released at the end of his contract in November 2025.

== Career statistics ==
As of match played 4 April 2025

Appearances and goals by club, season and competition
Club	Season	League			National Cup		League Cup		Other		Total	
Club	Season	Division	Apps	Goals	Apps	Goals	Apps	Goals	Apps	Goals	Apps	Goals
Luton Town	2010–11	Conference Premier	1	0	0	0	—		3 (Note: Appearance(s) in FA Trophy)	0	4	0
Luton Town	2011–12	Conference Premier	0	0	0	0	—		3	0	3	0
Luton Town	2012–13	Conference Premier	0	0	1	0	—		1	0	2	0
Luton Town	2013–14	Conference Premier	21	1	1	0	—		0	0	22	1
Luton Town	2014–15	League Two	18	0	1	0	0	0	1 (Note: Appearance(s) in Football League Trophy)	0	20	0
Luton Town	Total		40	1	3	0	0	0	8	0	51	1
Cambridge City (loan)	2011–12	Southern League Premier Division	12	0	2	0	—		0	0	14	0
Thurrock (loan)	2011–12	Conference South	3	0	0	0	—		0	0	3	0
Eastbourne Borough (loan)	2011–12	Conference South	14	2	0	0	—		0	0	14	2
Eastleigh (loan)	2012–13	Conference South	18	1	0	0	—		2 (Note: Two appearances in Conference South play-offs)	0	20	1
Yeovil Town	2015–16	League Two	20	0	2	0	1	0	2	0	25	0
Yeovil Town	2016–17	League Two	40	3	2	0	1	0	4 (Note: Appearances in EFL Trophy)	1	47	4
Yeovil Town	Total		60	3	4	0	2	0	6	1	72	4
Gillingham	2017–18	League One	11	1	1	0	0	0	1	0	13	1
Gillingham	2018–19	League One	16	1	2	0	2	0	2	0	22	1
Gillingham	Total		27	2	3	0	2	0	3	0	35	2
Notts County	2019–20	National League	11	0	0	0	—		5 (Note: Three appearances in FA Trophy, two appearances in National League play-offs)	0	16	0
Notts County	2020–21	National League	21	1	3	0	—		4	0	28	1
Notts County	2021–22	National League	27	5	0	0	—		4 (Note: Three appearances in FA Trophy and one appearance in National League play-offs)	0	31	5
Notts County	Total		59	6	3	0	—		13	0	75	6
Hartlepool United	2022–23	League Two	17	2	1	0	0	0	3	0	21	2
Hartlepool United	2023–24	National League	14	0	1	0	0	0	0	0	15	0
Hartlepool United	Total		31	2	2	0	0	0	3	0	36	2
Bohemians	2025	LOI Premier Division	1	0	0	0	–		0	0	1	0
Career total			265	17	17	0	4	0	35	1	321	18

== Honours ==
Luton Town

- Conference Premier: 2013–14

Individual

- Yeovil Town Green & White Supporters Club and Community Sports Trust Player of the Season: 2016–17
