= Ross Lafayette =

English footballer

Personal information
- Full name: Ross Lafayette
- Date of birth: 22 November 1985 (age 40)
- Place of birth: Watford, England
- Height: 6 ft 2 in (1.89 m)
- Position: Forward

Senior career*
Years	Team	Apps	(Gls)
2006	Beaconsfield SYCOB		
2006–2007	Chesham United	21	(3)
2007–2008	Barton Rovers	11	(1)
2008	Chesham United	2	(0)
2008–2009	Aylesbury United	11	(0)
2009	Wealdstone	4	(0)
2009–2010	Aylesbury	6	(4)
2010	Burnham	16	(5)
2010–2012	Hemel Hempstead Town	30	(12)
2012–2014	Welling United	79	(36)
2014–2015	Luton Town	11	(0)
2015	→ Woking (loan)	11	(3)
2015	→ Welling United (loan)	7	(2)
2015–2016	Eastleigh	22	(4)
2016	→ Aldershot Town (loan)	16	(2)
2016–2017	Dover Athletic	44	(12)
2017–2018	Sutton United	27	(7)
2018	→ Maidstone United (loan)	10	(3)
2018–2019	Billericay Town	22	(4)
2019–2021	Wealdstone	49	(16)
Total		399	(114)
- * Club domestic league appearances and goals as of 21:57, 21 November 2020 (UTC)

Ross Lafayette (born 22 November 1985) is an English former professional footballer who played as a striker.

Lafayette's early career consisted of playing for non-League football clubs in North London and the home counties.

== Football career ==
Born in Watford, Lafayette played youth football with Garston Boys.

After playing for Beaconsfield SYCOB, Chesham United, Barton Rovers and Aylesbury United, Lafayette signed for Wealdstone in summer 2009. He made 6 competitive appearances for Wealdstone without scoring. He also had spells at Aylesbury and Burnham during the 2009–10 season. He played for Hemel Hempstead Town during the 2010–11 and 2011–12 campaigns.

Lafayette signed for Welling United from Hemel Hempstead Town in the summer of 2012. In his first season, he contributed to Welling winning the Conference South by scoring 19 goals. In his second season Lafayette scored 16 goals as Welling established themselves in the Conference Premier.

After two seasons at Welling, Lafayette signed a two-year contract with League Two side Luton Town. He made his league debut against Bury on 19 August 2014, coming off the bench. He made only one start for Luton before being loaned out to Conference Premier side Woking for a month in January 2015, scoring once in six league and cup appearances. He was loaned back to former club Welling in March 2015 and scored twice to help the club avoid relegation.

He was transfer listed by Luton at the end of the 2014–15 season, and subsequently signed for Eastleigh on a free transfer. In January 2016, he joined Aldershot Town on loan until the end of the season.

He joined Dover Athletic in August 2016.

He joined Sutton United in May 2017. He joined Maidstone United on a one-month loan in February 2018. In March 2018, his loan was extended until the end of the season. He was recalled by Sutton United in April 2018.

In June 2019 he signed with Wealdstone for the second time. After scoring six goals in eight games for Wealdstone in August 2019, he was awarded the National League South Player of the Month award for that month. Lafayette was the Stones' top scorer in the 2019-20 season, netting 12 times as they were eventually promoted through points per game. He signed a new one-year deal with Wealdstone ahead of the 2020–21 season. Lafayette scored 4 times in an injury dominated second season with the Stones, where he made only 20 league appearances.

On 1 June 2021, Lafayette announced his retirement

== Media career ==
Alongside his part-time playing career, Lafayette trained in digital media and was employed by The Independent and Evening Standard. He joined London based company esbconnect as Sales and Partnerships Director in 2023.
