= Steve McNulty =

English footballer

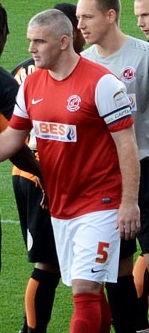
- McNulty playing for Fleetwood Town in 2012

Personal information
- Full name: Stephen Michael McNulty
- Date of birth: 26 September 1983 (age 43)
- Place of birth: Liverpool, England
- Height: 6 ft 1 in (1.86 m)
- Position: Centre back

Youth career
- 1990–2003: Liverpool

Senior career*
| Years | Team | Apps | (Gls) |
| 2003–2005 | Burscough | | |
| 2005–2007 | Vauxhall Motors (Note: The Vauxhall Motors appearances and goals does not include the 2005–06 season.) | 55 | (10) |
| 2007–2009 | Barrow | 78 | (12) |
| 2009–2013 | Fleetwood Town | 126 | (5) |
| 2013–2016 | Luton Town | 117 | (2) |
| 2015–2016 | → Tranmere Rovers (loan) | 9 | (1) |
| 2016–2019 | Tranmere Rovers | 140 | (4) |
| 2019–2020 | York City | 26 | (0) |
| 2020–2021 | Witton Albion | 19 | (2) |
| 2021–2022 | Chester | 0 | (0) |

Managerial career
- 2022–2023: Bootle
- * Club domestic league appearances and goals as of 13:48, 28 December 2021 (UTC)

Stephen Michael McNulty (born 26 September 1983) is an English professional footballer and coach who was most recently manager of Northern Premier League Division One West side Bootle. He has played in the English Football League for Fleetwood Town, Luton Town and Tranmere Rovers.

McNulty has achieved six promotions with four clubs: captaining Barrow into the Conference Premier and Fleetwood Town into both the Conference Premier and League Two, as part of the Luton Town team that won promotion to League Two in the 2013–14 season, and captaining the Tranmere Rovers team that was promoted into League Two in 2017–18 and League One in 2018–19, both via the playoffs.

== Career ==
=== Early career ===
Born in Liverpool, Merseyside, McNulty started his career at the Liverpool Academy when he was seven years old, eventually captaining the club's under-19 team, and stayed there until his release in 2003. He trained with Second Division club Blackpool during their pre-season training prior to the 2003–04 season, but failed to win a contract. During his time out of the game he worked as a furniture van driver before being recommended to Mike Marsh by scout Owen Brown. He then played for Northern Premier League club Burscough for two seasons before moving up a division to the Conference North when signing for Vauxhall Motors in February 2005. He remained with the club for two further years and joined their divisional rivals Barrow at the beginning of the 2007–08 season on a free transfer.

=== Barrow ===
McNulty was appointed as captain in his first season at Barrow as he led the club to promotion, via the play-offs, to the Conference Premier. His performances in defence led to him being named as Conference North Player of the Year, and he signed a two-year contract extension towards the end of the 2007–08 season after interest from Football League clubs. Barrow finished the next season in 20th place, just above the relegation zone. With a year left on his contract, McNulty opted against making the transition to a full-time contract as Barrow began to shift away from being a part-time team. Manager David Bayliss stated that the club had "a wage structure that [it] can't break".

=== Fleetwood Town ===
On 16 June 2009, McNulty dropped down a league to sign for Conference North club Fleetwood Town for a then-club record fee of £17,000. He was made club captain, leading the team to promotion to the Conference Premier via victory in the Conference North play-off final. Fleetwood were defeated in the play-off semi-finals during the next season, but bounced back in 2011–12 by winning promotion to the Football League for the first time in the club's history. They accumulated 103 points, with McNulty leading the club on a 29-match unbeaten run in the league.

He made his League Cup debut on 13 August 2012 against Nottingham Forest, and played in Fleetwood's first Football League match – a 0–0 draw with Torquay United – four days later. Long standing Fleetwood manager Micky Mellon left the club in December 2012 to be replaced by Graham Alexander. McNulty, injured at the time of the managerial change, remained sidelined as Fleetwood's defence kept five clean sheets in seven matches. After discussions about McNulty's limited playing time, Alexander allowed him to leave the club; a move criticised by Fleetwood fans, but described as having the player's "best interests at heart".

=== Luton Town ===
On 31 January 2013, McNulty joined Conference Premier club Luton Town on a free transfer, signing a contract until the end of the season with a conditional 12-month extension that was dependent on Luton achieving promotion. He made 20 appearances for the club in the 2012–13 season, scoring once, as they finished seventh and outside of the promotion positions. On 29 April 2013, McNulty agreed a two-year contract extension following performances that made him an "instant cult hero" with Luton fans.

He was named as the club's vice-captain for the 2013–14 season, and was part of a defence that kept a club-record 23 clean sheets in the league, ultimately leading to Luton winning the league and being promoted to League Two. McNulty's influence on Luton's successful season did not go unnoticed, as he won the Player of the Year award, Internet Player of the Year award, as well as the Goal of the Season award for his 30-yard volley against Southport on 26 November 2013.

McNulty was named as Luton's captain for the 2014–15 season following the departure of Ronnie Henry. In July 2014, he signed a two-year contract extension. He played in 45 matches in all competitions as Luton finished the season in eighth position. McNulty's performances were recognised by his inclusion in the Professional Footballers' Association League Two Team of the Year.

=== Tranmere Rovers ===
McNulty joined National League club Tranmere Rovers on loan on 19 October 2015, as he wanted to be closer to his family. On 2 January 2016, he signed for the club permanently on a one-and-a-half-year contract.

McNulty was awarded with Tranmere player of the month for February 2016, after an impressive run. He received numerous man of the match awards as Tranmere climbed from mid-table into the National League play-off positions.

McNulty captained the Tranmere as they beat Boreham Wood 2–1 at Wembley Stadium in the 2018 National League play-off final to earn promotion to League Two.

He did so again a year later, as Tranmere beat Newport County 1–0 in the League Two play-off final on 25 May 2019. He was released by Tranmere at the end of the 2018–19 season.

=== York City ===
McNulty signed for National League North club York City on 27 June 2019. He played his last game for York City in their playoff semi-final defeat to Altrincham.

=== Witton Albion ===
McNulty joined Northern Premier League side Witton Albion on 20 August 2020.

=== Chester ===
McNulty was appointed as assistant manager at Chester on 28 December 2021, re-uniting with Steve Watson, his former manager at York. Chester confirmed that McNulty would also be registered as a player as part of his duties.

== Managerial career ==
On 24 August 2022, McNulty was appointed manager of Northern Premier League Division One West club Bootle. He resigned on 22 March 2023.

== Style of play ==
McNulty has been described as a "commanding" centre back who is noted for his aerial ability. As a graduate of the Liverpool Academy, which preaches technical development, he primarily passes the ball along the ground, often beginning his team's attacking movements as a result. His first-touch, calmness on the ball and flair have also been praised.

McNulty's leadership is also notable; he captained the Liverpool under-19 team, and won promotions while captaining Barrow, Fleetwood Town and Tranmere Rovers. His Luton teammate Alex Lacey has stated that McNulty is "a real leader" with strong communication skills, while John Still credited him for improving the performances of the whole team.

== Career statistics ==
As of match played 23 October 2021

Appearances and goals by club, season and competition
| Club | Season | League | | | FA Cup | | League Cup | | Other | | Total | |
| Club | Season | Division | Apps | Goals | Apps | Goals | Apps | Goals | Apps | Goals | Apps | Goals |
|---|---|---|---|---|---|---|---|---|---|---|---|---|
| Vauxhall Motors | 2004–05 | Conference North | 18 | 3 | — | | — | | — | | 18 | 3 |
| Vauxhall Motors | 2006–07 | Conference North | 37 | 7 | 1 | 0 | — | | 4 (Note: Appearance(s) in FA Trophy) | 1 | 42 | 8 |
| Vauxhall Motors | Total | | 55 | 10 | 1 | 0 | — | | 4 | 1 | 60 | 11 |
| Barrow | 2007–08 | Conference North | 41 | 8 | 6 | 2 | — | | 8 (Note: Four appearances in Conference League Cup, one in FA Trophy, three in Conference North play-offs) | 0 | 55 | 10 |
| Barrow | 2008–09 | Conference Premier | 37 | 4 | 5 | 1 | — | | 5 (Note: Three appearances in Conference League Cup, two in FA Trophy) | 0 | 47 | 5 |
| Barrow | Total | | 78 | 12 | 11 | 3 | — | | 13 | 0 | 102 | 15 |
| Fleetwood Town | 2009–10 | Conference North | 33 | 2 | 5 | 1 | — | | 6 (Note: Three appearances in FA Trophy, three in Conference North play-offs) | 0 | 44 | 3 |
| Fleetwood Town | 2010–11 | Conference Premier | 38 | 1 | 3 | 0 | — | | 3 (Note: One appearance in FA Trophy, two in Conference Premier play-offs) | 0 | 44 | 1 |
| Fleetwood Town | 2011–12 | Conference Premier | 39 | 0 | 6 | 0 | — | | 1 | 0 | 46 | 0 |
| Fleetwood Town | 2012–13 | League Two | 16 | 2 | 2 | 0 | 1 | 0 | 0 | 0 | 19 | 2 |
| Fleetwood Town | Total | | 126 | 5 | 16 | 1 | 1 | 0 | 10 | 0 | 153 | 6 |
| Luton Town | 2012–13 | Conference Premier | 20 | 1 | — | | — | | — | | 20 | 1 |
| Luton Town | 2013–14 | Conference Premier | 46 | 1 | 2 | 0 | — | | 0 | 0 | 48 | 1 |
| Luton Town | 2014–15 | League Two | 41 | 0 | 2 | 0 | 1 | 0 | 1 (Note: Appearance(s) in Football League Trophy) | 0 | 45 | 0 |
| Luton Town | 2015–16 | League Two | 10 | 0 | — | | 1 | 0 | 1 | 0 | 12 | 0 |
| Luton Town | Total | | 117 | 2 | 4 | 0 | 2 | 0 | 2 | 0 | 125 | 2 |
| Tranmere Rovers | 2015–16 | National League | 27 | 1 | 2 | 0 | — | | 1 | 0 | 30 | 1 |
| Tranmere Rovers | 2016–17 | National League | 45 | 2 | 1 | 0 | — | | 9 (Note: Six appearances in FA Trophy, three in National League play-offs) | 0 | 55 | 2 |
| Tranmere Rovers | 2017–18 | National League | 41 | 1 | 3 | 0 | — | | 3 (Note: One appearance in FA Trophy, two in National League play-offs) | 0 | 47 | 1 |
| Tranmere Rovers | 2018–19 | League Two | 27 | 0 | 4 | 0 | 1 | 0 | 1 (Note: Appearance(s) in League Two play-offs) | 0 | 33 | 0 |
| Tranmere Rovers | Total | | 140 | 4 | 10 | 0 | 1 | 0 | 14 | 0 | 165 | 4 |
| York City | 2019–20 | National League North | 26 | 0 | 2 | 0 | — | | 1 (Note: Appearance(s) in National League North play-offs) | 0 | 29 | 0 |
| Witton Albion | 2020–21 | Northern Premier League Premier Division | 7 | 1 | 1 | 0 | — | | 2 | 0 | 10 | 1 |
| Witton Albion | 2021–22 | Northern Premier League Premier Division | 12 | 1 | 1 | 0 | — | | 1 (Note: Appearance(s) in Cheshire Senior Cup) | 0 | 14 | 1 |
| Witton Albion | Total | | 19 | 2 | 2 | 0 | — | | 3 | 0 | 24 | 2 |
| Career total | | | 561 | 35 | 46 | 4 | 4 | 0 | 47 | 1 | 658 | 40 |

== Honours ==
Barrow

- Conference North play-offs: 2008

Fleetwood Town

- Conference Premier: 2011–12
- Conference North play-offs: 2010

Luton Town

- Conference Premier: 2013–14

Tranmere Rovers

- EFL League Two play-offs: 2019
- National League play-offs: 2018

Individual

- PFA Team of the Year: 2014–15 League Two
- Conference Premier Team of the Year: 2013–14
- Conference North Player of the Year: 2007–08
- Luton Town Player of the Year: 2013–14
