= 2011–12 AFC Wimbledon season =

AFC Wimbledon
2011–12 season
- Chairman: Erik Samuelson
- Manager: Terry Brown
- League Two: 16th
- Football League Cup: Preliminary Round v Crawley Town
- FA Cup: Second Round v Bradford City
- Football League Trophy: Third Round v Swindon Town
- Top goalscorer: League: Jack Midson (18); All: Jack Midson (20)
- Highest home attendance: 4,634 v Aldershot Town (28 January 2012)
- Lowest home attendance: 3,819 v Burton Albion (24 March 2012)
- Average home league attendance: 4,295
Home colours	Away colours	Third colours

The 2011–12 season represented the ninth in the history of AFC Wimbledon and second as a fully professional team. It was the first time in the club's history that they would compete in The Football League, as one of the two teams promoted from Conference National to Football League Two.

== League table ==
Pos	Team	Pld	W	D	L	GF	GA	GD	Pts
14	Accrington Stanley	46	14	15	17	54	66	−12	57
15	Morecambe	46	14	14	18	63	57	+6	56
16	AFC Wimbledon	46	15	9	22	62	78	−16	54
17	Burton Albion	46	14	12	20	54	81	−27	54
18	Bradford City	46	12	14	20	54	59	−5	50

Updated to match(es) played on 5 May 2012. Source: BBC Sport
Rules for classification: 1) Points; 2) Goal difference; 3) Number of goals scored

== Results summary ==
Round	1	2	3	4	5	6	7	8	9	10	11	12	13	14	15	16	17	18	19	20	21	22	23	24	25	26	27	28	29	30	31	32	33	34	35	36	37	38	39	40	41	42	43	44	45	46
Ground	H	A	A	H	A	H	A	H	H	A	H	A	H	H	A	A	H	H	A	H	A	H	H	A	A	A	H	H	A	H	A	A	A	H	H	H	A	A	H	A	H	A	A	H	A	H
Result	L	W	W	D	L	W	D	L	W	W	W	W	L	L	L	D	D	D	L	L	L	L	L	L	W	W	W	L	L	D	D	D	L	L	W	W	L	L	W	L	L	L	D	W	L	W
Position	17	10	5	7	14	7	9	15	12	7	4	3	6	9	12	12	11	12	13	17	17	17	17	17	16	15	15	15	16	17	17	17	17	17	17	14	15	16	15	15	17	17	17	16	17	16

Source: BBC Sport
A = Away; H = Home; W = Win; D = Draw; L = Loss

Overall								Home						Away					
Pld	W	D	L	GF	GA	GD	Pts	W	D	L	GF	GA	GD	W	D	L	GF	GA	GD
46	15	9	22	62	78	−16	54	9	4	10	39	40	−1	6	5	12	23	38	−15

Last updated: 5 May 2012.
Source: BBC Sport

== Match results ==
=== Pre-season friendlies ===
9 July 2011	AFC Wimbledon	2–0	Fulham XI	Kingsmeadow
15:00 BST (UTC+01)	Johnson 67'; Ademeno 83'	Report		Attendance: 1,890

12 July 2011	Staines Town	1–5	AFC Wimbledon	Wheatsheaf Park
19:45 BST (UTC+01)	Wheeler 64'	Report	Jolley 6'; Minshull 12'; Midson 31' 36'; Kiernan 52'	Attendance: 378

16 July 2011	Sutton United	1–1	AFC Wimbledon	Gander Green Lane
15:00 BST (UTC+01)	Kavanagh 54'	Report	L. Moore 8'	Attendance: 772

19 July 2011	Beckenham Town	0–6	AFC Wimbledon	Eden Park Avenue
19:45 BST (UTC+01)		Report	L. Moore 12'; Midson 25' 28' 31'; Yussuff 58'; Hatton 90'	Attendance: 265

21 July 2011 Phil Ledger Memorial Cup	Bedfont Town	1–1 (2–3 p)	AFC Wimbledon	The Orchard
19:45 BST (UTC+01)	Odunaike 27'	Report	Bush 18'
	Penalties
	Harris (penalty missed); Cooper (penalty missed); Savage (penalty missed); Kabuye (penalty scored); O’Sullivan (penalty scored)		(penalty scored) Jones; (penalty missed) Rose; (penalty scored) Turner; (penalty missed) Dos Santos; (penalty scored) Bush

23 July 2011	AFC Wimbledon	2–1	Watford	Kingsmeadow
15:00 BST (UTC+01)	L. Moore 40' 55'	Report	Eustace 13'	Attendance: 1,613

26 July 2011	Tooting & Mitcham United	1–2	AFC Wimbledon	Imperial Fields
19:45 BST (UTC+01)	Byatt 88' (pen.)	Report	Kiernan 48'; Serbony 68'

30 July 2011	Godalming Town	2–1	AFC Wimbledon	Weycourt
15:00 BST (UTC+01)	Foulser 9'; Harris 37'	Report	Bush 48'

=== League Two 2011–12 ===
6 August 2011 Game 1	AFC Wimbledon	2–3	Bristol Rovers	Kingsmeadow
12:45 BST (UTC+01)	Stuart (yellow card) 4' (goal) 38'; Ademeno 67'	Report	Zebroski (yellow card) 8'; Anyinsah (yellow card) 12'; McGleish 16'; Harrold 19' (yellow card) 60'; Virgo (yellow card) 38' (goal) 84' (pen.)	Attendance: 4,629; Referee: Keith Stroud

13 August 2011 Game 2	Dagenham & Redbridge	0–2	AFC Wimbledon	Victoria Road
12:45 BST (UTC+01)		Report	L. Moore 37' (yellow card) 49'; Yusuff 56'; Hatton (yellow card) 72'	Attendance: 2,904; Referee: Bobby Madley

16 August 2011 Game 3	Plymouth Argyle	0–2	AFC Wimbledon	Home Park
19:45 BST (UTC+01)	Zubar (yellow card) 40'	Report	Midson 53' 59'	Attendance: 5,900; Referee: Mark Heywood

20 August 2011 Game 4	AFC Wimbledon	1–1	Hereford United	Kingsmeadow
15:00 BST (UTC+01)	Midson 24'	Report	Facey 7'; Clist (yellow card) 17'; Featherstone (yellow card) 62'	Attendance: 4,239; Referee: James Linington

27 August 2011 Game 5	Macclesfield Town	4–0	AFC Wimbledon	Moss Rose
15:00 BST (UTC+01)	Brisley 2'; Diagne 23'; Tremarco (yellow card) 43'; Sinclair 47'; Mendy 86'	Report	Johnson (yellow card) 29'; S. Moore (yellow card) 51'; Stuart (yellow card) 69'	Attendance: 1,881; Referee: Carl Boyeson

3 September 2011 Game 6	AFC Wimbledon	3–2	Port Vale	Kingsmeadow
15:00 BST (UTC+01)	S. Moore (yellow card) 11'; Midson 39'; Gwillim 59'; Minshull (yellow card) 75'; Jolley 90+4'	Report	Roberts (yellow card) 31'; Tomlinson (yellow card) 39'; Dodds 46' (yellow card) 90+6'; Owen (yellow card) 57'; Morsy 83'	Attendance: 4,404; Referee: Graham Scott

10 September 2011 Game 7	Aldershot Town	1–1	AFC Wimbledon	Recreation Ground
15:00 BST (UTC+01)	Collins (yellow card) 35'; Hylton (yellow card) 71' (goal) 90'	Report	Porter 17'; Wellard (yellow card) 35' (yellow card) 90+1' (red card); L. Moore (yellow card) 55'	Attendance: 4,110; Referee: Fred Graham

13 September 2011 Game 8	AFC Wimbledon	0–3	Northampton Town	Kingsmeadow
19:45 BST (UTC+01)	Brown (yellow card) 16'	Report	Akinfenwa 16' (pen.); McKoy (red card) 45+1'; Jackson (yellow card) 56'; Young (yellow card) 56'; Jacobs 73' 77'	Attendance: 4,271; Referee: James Adcock

17 September 2011 Game 9	AFC Wimbledon	4–1	Cheltenham Town	Kingsmeadow
15:00 BST (UTC+01)	Wellard 30'; Elliott 39' (o.g.); Minshull (yellow card) 44'; Midson 65'; Hatton (yellow card) 82'; Yussuff 83'	Report	Duffy 88'	Attendance: 3,860; Referee: Simon Hooper

24 September 2011 Game 10	Bradford City	1–2	AFC Wimbledon	Valley Parade
15:00 BST (UTC+01)	Flynn 25' (pen.)	Report	Midson 30'; Jolley 56'; Hatton (yellow card) 65'	Attendance: 10,255; Referee: Mark Brown

1 October 2011 Game 11	AFC Wimbledon	3–1	Gillingham	Kingsmeadow
15:00 BST (UTC+01)	Jolley 10' 12'; Midson 22'	Report	Richards (yellow card) 12'; Nouble (yellow card) 53'; Jackman (yellow card) 67'; Lee 67' (yellow card) 83'	Attendance: 4,606; Referee: Michael Naylor

8 October 2011 Game 12	Morecambe	1–2	AFC Wimbledon	Globe Arena
15:00 BST (UTC+01)	Drummond 20' (yellow card) 53'; Parrish (yellow card) 29'; Jevons (yellow card) 45+3'	Report	Bush (yellow card) 22'; Midson 35'; L. Moore (yellow card) 80'; Jolley 83'	Attendance: 2,631; Referee: Webb

15 October 2011 Game 13	AFC Wimbledon	1–3	Crewe Alexandra	Kingsmeadow
15:00 BST (UTC+01)	Jolley 59'; L. Moore (yellow card) 77'	Report	Powell 45'; Dugdale 78'; Leitch-Smith 87'	Attendance: 4,604; Referee: David Phillips

22 October 2011 Game 14	AFC Wimbledon	2–5	Crawley Town	Kingsmeadow
15:00 BST (UTC+01)	Davis 11' (o.g.); Midson 44'	Report	Bush 3' (o.g.); Davis 9'; Torres (yellow card) 42'; Tubbs 54'; Bulman 59' 84'	Attendance: 4,549; Referee: Madley

25 October 2011 Game 15	Torquay United	4–0	AFC Wimbledon	Plainmoor
19:45 BST (UTC+01)	Stevens 32'; O'Kane 43'; Howe 45' 56'	Report	Hatton (yellow card) 75'; Stuart (yellow card) 82'	Attendance: 2,353; Referee: Brendan Malone

29 October 2011 Game 16	Shrewsbury Town	0–0	AFC Wimbledon	Greenhous Meadow
15:00 BST (UTC+01)	Cansdell-Sherriff (yellow card) 51'; Grandison (yellow card) 75'; Sharps (yellow card) 77'; Morgan (yellow card) 90'	Report	Johnson (yellow card) 12'; Stuart (yellow card) 84'	Attendance: 5,861; Referee: Steve Rushton

5 November 2011 Game 17	AFC Wimbledon	1–1	Barnet	Kingsmeadow
15:00 GMT	S. Moore 62' (yellow card) 63'; Hatton (yellow card) 75'	Report	McLeod 45+1'; Dennehy (yellow card) 67'; Deering (yellow card) 81'	Attendance: 4,369; Referee: Jon Moss

19 November 2011 Game 18	AFC Wimbledon	1–1	Swindon Town	Kingsmeadow
15:00 GMT	Hatton 6'; Midson (yellow card) 21'; Bush (yellow card) 85'; S. Moore (yellow card) 89'	Report	Ridehalgh (yellow card) 28'; Connell 73'; Caddis (yellow card) 88'	Attendance: 4,581; Referee: Iain Williamson

26 November 2011 Game 19	Burton Albion	3–2	AFC Wimbledon	Pirelli Stadium
15:00 GMT	Kee 14' 29'; Bolder 62'	Report	L. Moore 45'; Webster 82' (o.g.)	Attendance: 3,282; Referee: Steve Tanner

10 December 2011 Game 20	AFC Wimbledon	0–2	Accrington Stanley	Kingsmeadow
15:00 GMT	Stuart (yellow card) 12'; S. Moore (yellow card) 73'	Report	Amond 3'; Lindfield (yellow card) 17' (goal) 24'; Hessey (yellow card) 59'	Attendance: 4,053; Referee: Carl Boyeson

17 December 2011 Game 21	Rotherham United	1–0	AFC Wimbledon	Don Valley Stadium
15:00 GMT	Wood 78'	Report		Attendance: 3,343; Referee: Miller

26 December 2011 Game 22	AFC Wimbledon	0–2	Oxford United	Kingsmeadow
12:15 GMT	Midson (yellow card) 63'	Report	Constable 18'; Hall 44'; Whing (yellow card) 50'	Attendance: 4,547; Referee: Andy D'Urso

31 December 2011 Game 23	AFC Wimbledon	1–4	Southend United	Kingsmeadow
15:00 GMT	Midson 7'; Stuart (yellow card) 39'; Jolley (red card) 44'; S. Moore (yellow card) 58'	Report	Hall (yellow card) 19' (goal) 30'; Stuart 51' (o.g.); Phillips 64'; Harris 79'; Grant (yellow card) 83'; Ferdinand (yellow card) 90'	Attendance: 4,529; Referee: Trevor Kettle

2 January 2012 Game 24	Swindon Town	2–0	AFC Wimbledon	County Ground
15:00 GMT	Caddis 58'; Flint (yellow card) 67'; Connell 76'	Report	McNaughton (yellow card) 61'	Attendance: 8,374; Referee: David Phillips

14 January 2012 Game 25	Port Vale	1–2	AFC Wimbledon	Vale Park
15:00 GMT	Richards 31'; Yates (yellow card) 43'; Griffith (yellow card) 45+2'	Report	Midson 41'; L. Moore 77'	Attendance: 4,326; Referee: Davies

21 January 2012 Game 26	Gillingham	3–4	AFC Wimbledon	Priestfield Stadium
15:00 GMT	Tomlin 4' 62'; Kuffour 54'	Report	L. Moore 60'; Richards 73' (o.g.); Midson (yellow card) 50' (goal) 80' (pen.) 89'; Moncur (yellow card) 89'	Attendance: 6,236; Referee: Brendan Malone

24 January 2012 Game 27	AFC Wimbledon	2–1	Macclesfield Town	Kingsmeadow
15:00 GMT	Knott 60'; S. Moore 88'	Report	Diagne (yellow card) 36'; Mattis 58'; Donnelly (yellow card) 65'; Mendy (yellow card) 68'	Attendance: 4000; Referee: Fred Graham

28 January 2012 Game 28	AFC Wimbledon	1–2	Aldershot Town	Kingsmeadow
15:00 GMT	S. Moore 28'	Report	Straker 13' 70'; Herd (yellow card) 86'	Attendance: 4,634; Referee: Paul Tierney

14 February 2012 Game 29	Northampton Town	1–0	AFC Wimbledon	Sixfields Stadium
19:45 GMT	Carlisle (yellow card) 62'; Guttridge 81'; Williams (yellow card) 83'	Report		Attendance: 4,072; Referee: Andy D'Urso

18 February 2012 Game 30	AFC Wimbledon	1–1	Morecambe	Kingsmeadow
15:00 GMT	Euell (yellow card) 20'; S. Moore (yellow card) 33'; Yussuff 75'	Report	Fleming (yellow card) 49'; McDonald 52'; Wilson (yellow card) 84'; Hunter (yellow card) 90+1'	Attendance: 3,964; Referee: Iain Williamson

21 February 2012 Game 31	Cheltenham Town	0–0	AFC Wimbledon	Whaddon Road
19:45 GMT	Bennett (yellow card) 41'	Report	Midson (yellow card) 46'; Bush (yellow card) 86'	Attendance: 2,603; Referee: Scott Mathieson

25 February 2012 Game 32	Crewe Alexandra	3–3	AFC Wimbledon	Alexandria Stadium
15:00 GMT	Moore 10'; Powell 11'; Pearson 31'; Bell (yellow card) 90+2'	Report	Knott 7'; Bush (yellow card) 46'; S. Moore (yellow card) 51' (goal) 81'; Jolley 90+1'	Attendance: 4,240; Referee: Dean Mohareb

3 March 2012 Game 33	Hereford United	2–1	AFC Wimbledon	Edgar Street
15:00 GMT	Taylor 18'; Barkhuizen 34'	Report	Midson 68'	Attendance: 2,147; Referee: Stuart Attwell

6 March 2012 Game 34	AFC Wimbledon	1–2	Plymouth Argyle	Kingsmeadow
19:45 GMT	Euell (yellow card) 19'; Midson 41' (yellow card) 88'	Report	Bhasera 1'; Wotton (yellow card) 22'; Berry (yellow card) 45+1'; Chadwick 49'; Feeney (yellow card) 90+1'	Attendance: 4,578; Referee: Danny McDermid

10 March 2012 Game 35	AFC Wimbledon	2–1	Dagenham & Redbridge	Kingsmeadow
15:00 GMT	Midson 73'; Djilali 86' (yellow card) 90+1'	Report	Nurse (yellow card) 65'; Spillane (yellow card) 75' (goal) 83'	Attendance: 4,243; Referee: Andy Woolmer

13 March 2012 Game 36	AFC Wimbledon	3–1	Bradford City	Kingsmeadow
19:45 GMT	Midson 33' (pen.) 75'; Knott 54' (yellow card) 75'; S. Moore (yellow card) 59'	Report	Fagan (yellow card) 28' (yellow card) 37' (red card); Kozluk (yellow card) 31'; Balkestein 36' (o.g.); Bullock (yellow card) 38'; Davies (yellow card) 73'	Attendance: 4,064; Referee: Darren Deadman

17 March 2012 Game 37	Bristol Rovers	1–0	AFC Wimbledon	Memorial Stadium
15:00 GMT	Carayol 11'; Harrold (yellow card) 38'; Zebroski (yellow card) 50'; Gill (yellow card) 89'	Report		Attendance: 5,828; Referee: Mike Dean

20 March 2012 Game 38	Oxford United	1–0	AFC Wimbledon	Kassam Stadium
19:45 GMT	Duberry (yellow card) 54'; Morgan 57'	Report		Attendance: 6,366; Referee: Keith Stroud

24 March 2012 Game 39	AFC Wimbledon	4–0	Burton Albion	Kingsmeadow
15:00 GMT	L. Moore 9'; Hatton (yellow card) 42'; Moncur 75'; S. Moore (yellow card) 84' (goal) 90+3'; Harrison 90+1'	Report	Bolder (yellow card) 45+1'	Attendance: 3,819; Referee: Rob Lewis

31 March 2012 Game 40	Accrington Stanley	2–1	AFC Wimbledon	Crown Ground
15:00 GMT	Joyce 4'; Hatfield 80'	Report	L. Moore 30'	Attendance: 1,627; Referee: David Coote

6 April 2012 Game 41	AFC Wimbledon	1–2	Rotherham United	Kingsmeadow
15:00 GMT	L. Moore 65'	Report	Cresswell (yellow card) 11'; Pringle 34'; Hoskins 83'	Attendance: 4,387; Referee: David Phillips

9 April 2012 Game 42	Southend United	2–0	AFC Wimbledon	Roots Hall
15:00 GMT	Eastwood 70'; Hall (yellow card) 83'; Grant 90' (yellow card) 90'	Report	Mitchel-King (yellow card) 58'; Bush (yellow card) 71'	Attendance: 6,962; Referee: Steve Rushton

14 April 2012 Game 43	Crawley Town	1–1	AFC Wimbledon	Broadfield Stadium
15:00 GMT	Davies (yellow card) 83'; Akpan (red card) 5'; Dempster (yellow card) 52'; Alexander 81'	Report	S. Moore (yellow card) 11' (goal) 77'	Attendance: 3,768; Referee: Darren Drysdale

21 April 2012 Game 44	AFC Wimbledon	2–0	Torquay United	Kingsmeadow
15:00 GMT	Yussuff 79'; Bush (yellow card) 84'; Moncur 85' (yellow card) 86'	Report	O'Kane (yellow card) 68'; Howe (yellow card) 89'; Mansell (yellow card) 90+1'	Attendance: 4,171; Referee: James Adcock

28 April 2012 Game 45	Barnet	4–0	AFC Wimbledon	Underhill Stadium
15:00 GMT	Holmes 33'; Mustoe (yellow card) 36'; Deering 81'; May 86'; Hughes 90+1'	Report		Attendance: 4,422; Referee: Gary Sutton

5 May 2012 Game 46	AFC Wimbledon	3–1	Shrewsbury Town	Kingsmeadow
15:00 GMT	Harrison 47'; L. Moore 55' 61'	Report	Cansdell-Sherriff 58'	Attendance: 3,678; Referee: Oliver Langford

=== FA Cup ===
12 November 2011 First Round	AFC Wimbledon	0–0	Scunthorpe United	Kingsmeadow
15:00 GMT	Stuart (yellow card) 79'	Report	Dagnall (yellow card) 15'; Nelson (yellow card) 38'	Attendance: 2,933; Referee: Dean Whitestone

22 November 2011 Replay	Scunthorpe United	0–1	AFC Wimbledon	Glanford Park
19:45 GMT	Togwell (yellow card) 45+3'	Report	Yussuff (yellow card) 59'; L. Moore 66'	Attendance: 2,036; Referee: Graham Salisbury

3 December 2011 Second Round	Bradford City	3–1	AFC Wimbledon	Valley Parade
15:00 GMT	Hannah 9'; Bush 14' (o.g.); Fagan 69' (pen.); Flynn (yellow card) 87'; Ravenhill (yellow card) 90+2'	Report	Mulley (yellow card) 32'; Midson 50'	Attendance: 3,432; Referee: Nigel Miller

=== Football League Cup ===
29 July 2011 Preliminary Round	Crawley Town	3–2	AFC Wimbledon	Broadfield Stadium
19:45 BST (UTC+01)	Akpan 38' (yellow card) 81' (yellow card) 90+4' (red card); Dempster (yellow card) 41'; Torres 53'; Tubbs 64'	Report	L. Moore 26' (yellow card) 45+1'; Midson 46'; Ademeno (yellow card) 83'	Attendance: 3,204; Referee: Darren Deadman

=== Football League Trophy ===
4 October 2011 Second Round	AFC Wimbledon	2–2 (4–3 p)	Stevenage	Kingsmeadow
19:45 BST (UTC+01)	Hatton 54'; Yussuff 58'; Porter (yellow card) 71'	Report	Wilson 7'; Henry (yellow card) 55'; Laird (yellow card) 60'; Roberts 90'	Attendance: 1,416; Referee: Dean Whitestone
	Penalties
	Hatton (penalty scored); Wellard (penalty scored); Yussuff (penalty missed); Bush (penalty scored); Minshull (penalty scored)		Charles (penalty missed); Mousinho (penalty scored); Reid (penalty scored); Walker (penalty scored); Wilson (penalty missed)

8 November 2011 Third Round	Swindon Town	1–1 (3–1 p)	AFC Wimbledon	County Ground
19:30 BST (UTC+01)	Risser 68'	Report	Bush (yellow card) 46'; Yussuff 82'	Attendance: 4,329; Referee: Andy D'Urso
	Penalties
	Connell (penalty scored); Risser (penalty scored); Esajas (penalty scored)		Minshull (penalty missed); Wellard (penalty missed); Franks (penalty scored); Bush (penalty missed)

== Squad statistics ==
=== Appearances and goals ===
As of 30 April 2012

No.	Pos	Nat	Player	Total		League Two		FA Cup		League Cup		FL Trophy	
No.	Pos	Nat	Player	Apps	Goals	Apps	Goals	Apps	Goals	Apps	Goals	Apps	Goals
1	GK	(England) ENG	Seb Brown	49	0	44	0	3+0	0	1+0	0	1+0	0
10	FW	(England) ENG	Jack Midson	52	20	43+3	18	2+1	1	1+0	1	2+0	0
11	FW	(England) ENG	Luke Moore	40	11	29+8	9	2+0	1	1+0	1	0	0
12	MF	(England) ENG	Christian Jolley	41	7	23+14	7	2+0	0	1+0	0	1+0	0
15	MF	(England) ENG	Sammy Moore	46	6	40+1	6	3+0	0	0+1	0	1+0	0
17	DF	(England) ENG	Mat Mitchel-King	24	0	24	0	0	0	0	0	0	0
18	MF	(England) ENG	Brendan Kiernan	9	0	1+7	0	0+1	0	0	0	0	0
22	DF	(England) ENG	Callum McNaughton	20	0	18+0	0	0+0	0	0+0	0	2+0	0
23	MF	(England) ENG	Rashid Yussuff	46	6	30+11	4	2+0	0	1+0	0	2+0	2
24	DF	(Netherlands) NED	Pim Balkestein	6	0	6	0	0+0	0	0+0	0	0+0	0
27	FW	(England) ENG	Byron Harrison	19	2	11+8	2	0	0	0	0	0	0
30	FW	(England) ENG	Jason Prior	3	0	2+1	0	0	0	0	0	0	0
32	MF	(England) ENG	Huw Johnson	1	0	0+1	0	0+0	0	0+0	0	0+0	0
Players who played on loan for AFC Wimbledon but subsequently returned to their parent club:
25	MF	(England) ENG	George Moncur	20	2	20+0	2	0	0	0	0	0	0
28	MF	(England) ENG	Billy Knott	20	3	14+6	3	0	0	0	0	0	0
29	FW	(Jamaica) JAM	Jason Euell	9	0	8+1	0	0	0	0	0	0	0
31	DF	(England) ENG	Gavin Hoyte	3	0	2+1	0	0	0	0	0	0	0
Players who played for AFC Wimbledon but were subsequently released by the club:
2	DF	(England) ENG	Ryan Jackson	10	0	3+4	0	1+1	0	0+0	0	1+0	0
3	DF	(England) ENG	Gareth Gwillim	28	1	27	1	0	0	1+0	0	0	0
4	MF	(England) ENG	Max Porter	20	1	11+4	1	1+1	0	1+0	0	0+2	0
5	DF	(England) ENG	Jamie Stuart	39	1	33+1	1	3+0	0	1+0	0	1+0	0
6	DF	(England) ENG	Brett Johnson	23	0	14+4	0	3+0	0	1+0	0	1+0	0
7	DF	(England) ENG	Sam Hatton	49	2	41+3	1	3+0	0	1+0	0	1+0	1
8	MF	(England) ENG	Ricky Wellard	28	1	16+6	1	2+1	0	1+0	0	1+1	0
9	FW	(England) ENG	Charles Ademeno	21	1	5+10	1	1+2	0	0+1	0	0+2	0
13	DF	(England) ENG	Chris Bush	28	0	16+6	0	3+0	0	0+1	0	2+0	0
14	MF	(England) ENG	Lee Minshull	21	0	13+5	0	0+1	0	0	0	1+1	0
16	DF	(England) ENG	Fraser Franks	5	0	3+1	0	0	0	0	0	1+0	0
19	MF	(England) ENG	Kieran Djilali	15	1	4+9	1	1+0	0	0	0	1+0	0
20	GK	(England) ENG	Jack Turner	3	0	2	0	0+0	0	0+0	0	1+0	0
21	MF	(Wales) WAL	Reece Jones	1	0	1	0	0+0	0	0+0	0	0+0	0
26	MF	(England) ENG	James Mulley	15	0	3+8	0	1+1	0	0	0	2+0	0

=== Top scorers ===
Place	Position	Nation	Number	Name	League Two	FA Cup	League Cup	JP Trophy	Total
1	FW	(England)	10	Jack Midson	18	1	1	0	20
2	FW	(England)	11	Luke Moore	9	1	1	0	11
3	MF	(England)	12	Christian Jolley	7	0	0	0	7
4	MF	(England)	15	Sammy Moore	6	0	0	0	6
=	MF	(England)	23	Rashid Yussuff	4	0	0	2	6
5	MF	(England)	28	Billy Knott	3	0	0	0	3
6	DF	(England)	7	Sam Hatton	1	0	0	1	2
=	MF	(England)	25	George Moncur	2	0	0	0	2
=	MF	(England)	27	Byron Harrison	2	0	0	0	2
7	FW	(England)	9	Charles Ademeno	1	0	0	0	1
=	MF	(England)	19	Kieran Djilali	1	0	0	0	1
=	DF	(England)	3	Gareth Gwillim	1	0	0	0	1
=	MF	(England)	4	Max Porter	1	0	0	0	1
=	DF	(England)	5	Jamie Stuart	1	0	0	0	1
=	MF	(England)	8	Ricky Wellard	1	0	0	0	1
				TOTALS	62*	2	2	3	69

*Including own goals by opposition.

=== Disciplinary record ===
Number	Nation	Position	Name	League Two		FA Cup		League Cup		JP Trophy		Total	
Number	Nation	Position	Name	Yellow card	Red card	Yellow card	Red card	Yellow card	Red card	Yellow card	Red card	Yellow card	Red card
1	(England)	GK	Seb Brown	1	0	0	0	0	0	0	0	1	0
4	(England)	MF	Max Porter	0	0	0	0	0	0	1	0	1	0
5	(England)	DF	Jamie Stuart	6	0	0	0	0	0	0	0	6	0
6	(England)	DF	Brett Johnson	2	0	0	0	0	0	0	0	2	0
7	(England)	DF	Sam Hatton	6	0	0	0	0	0	0	0	6	0
8	(England)	MF	Ricky Wellard	2	1	0	0	0	0	0	0	2	1
9	(England)	FW	Charles Ademeno	0	0	0	0	1	0	0	0	1	0
10	(England)	FW	Jack Midson	5	0	0	0	0	0	0	0	5	0
11	(England)	FW	Luke Moore	4	0	0	0	1	0	0	0	5	0
12	(England)	MF	Christian Jolley	0	1	0	0	0	0	0	0	0	1
13	(England)	DF	Chris Bush	6	0	0	0	0	0	1	0	7	0
14	(England)	MF	Lee Minshull	2	0	0	0	0	0	0	0	2	0
15	(England)	MF	Sammy Moore	11	0	0	0	0	0	0	0	11	0
17	(England)	DF	Mat Mitchel-King	1	0	0	0	0	0	0	0	1	0
19	(England)	MF	Kieran Djilali	1	0	0	0	0	0	0	0	1	0
22	(England)	DF	Callum McNaughton	1	0	0	0	0	0	0	0	1	0
23	(England)	MF	Rashid Yussuff	0	0	1	0	0	0	0	0	1	0
25	(England)	MF	George Moncur	2	0	0	0	0	0	0	0	2	0
26	(England)	MF	James Mulley	0	0	1	0	0	0	0	0	1	0
29	(Jamaica)	FW	Jason Euell	2	0	0	0	0	0	0	0	2	0
			TOTALS	52	2	2	0	2	0	2	0	58	2

== Transfers ==
Players Transferred In
Date	Pos.	Name	Previous club	Fee	Ref.
5 June 2011	MF	(England) Max Porter	(England) Rushden & Diamonds	Free	
17 June 2011	FW	(England) Jack Midson	(England) Oxford United	Free	
24 June 2011	DF	(England) Mat Mitchel-King	(England) Crewe Alexandra	Free	
27 June 2011	FW	(England) Charles Ademeno	(England) Grimsby Town	Free	
27 June 2011	DF	(England) Chris Bush	(England) Brentford	Undisclosed	
11 July 2011	DF	(England) Gareth Gwillim	(England) Dagenham & Redbridge	Free	
27 August 2011	MF	(England) Kieran Djilali	(England) Crystal Palace	Free	
6 January 2012	DF	(England) Callum McNaughton	(England) West Ham United	Free	
6 January 2012	FW	(England) Byron Harrison	(England) Stevenage	Undisclosed	
25 January 2012	FW	(England) Jason Prior	(England) Bognor Regis Town	Undisclosed	
2 March 2012	FW	(England) Charlie Strutton	(England) Chalfont St Peter	Undisclosed	
Players Loaned In
Date from	Pos.	Name	From	Date to	Ref.
9 September 2011	DF	(England) Callum McNaughton	(England) West Ham United	9 November 2011	
10 January 2012	MF	(Jamaica) Jason Euell	(England) Charlton Athletic	17 March 2012	
12 January 2012	MF	(England) George Moncur	(England) West Ham United	End of season	
12 January 2012	MF	(England) Billy Knott	(England) Sunderland	End of season	
27 January 2012	DF	(England) Gavin Hoyte	(England) Arsenal	27 February 2012	
9 March 2012	DF	(Netherlands) Pim Balkestein	(England) Brentford	9 April 2012	
Players Loaned Out
Date from	Pos.	Name	To	Date to	Ref.
23 September 2011	DF	(England) Fraser Franks	(England) Hayes & Yeading	23 October 2011	
14 October 2011	DF	(England) Ryan Jackson	(England) Fleetwood Town	14 November 2011	
13 January 2012	DF	(England) Lee Minshull	(Wales) Newport County	End of season	
26 January 2012	DF	(England) Brett Johnson	(England) Cambridge United	26 February 2012	
26 January 2012	MF	(England) Brendan Kiernan	(England) Braintree Town	26 February 2012	
31 January 2012	DF	(England) Ryan Jackson	(England) Cambridge United	End of season	
29 February 2012	MF	(England) Max Porter	(Wales) Newport County	End of season	
22 March 2012	DF	(England) Fraser Franks	(Wales) Newport County	22 April 2012	
Players Transferred Out
Date	Pos.	Name	Subsequent club	Fee	Ref
1 July 2011	MF	(England) Steven Gregory	(England) Bournemouth	Undisclosed	
1 July 2011	FW	(England) Danny Kedwell	(England) Gillingham	Undisclosed	
Players Released
Date	Pos.	Name	Subsequent club	Join date	Ref.
January 2012	DF	(England) Ryan Jackson	(England) Macclesfield Town	7 June 2012	
January 2012	MF	(England) Max Porter	(Wales) Newport County	June 2012	
January 2012	FW	(England) Charles Ademeno	(England) Eastbourne Borough	21 March 2012	
January 2012	MF	(England) Lee Minshull	(England) Newport County	8 May 2012	
January 2012	MF	(England) James Mulley	(England) Braintree Town		
8 May 2012	DF	(England) Gareth Gwillim	(England) Sutton United	6 July 2012	
8 May 2012	DF	(England) Jamie Stuart	(England) Sutton United	22 May 2012	
8 May 2012	DF	(England) Brett Johnson	(England) Woking	1 August 2012	
8 May 2012	MF	(England) Ricky Wellard	(England) Cambridge United	18 May 2012	
8 May 2012	DF	(England) Chris Bush	(England) Gateshead	21 June 2012	
8 May 2012	DF	(England) Fraser Franks	(England) Welling United	20 June 2012	
8 May 2012	MF	(England) Kieran Djilali	(England) Portsmouth	16 August 2012	
8 May 2012	GK	(England) Jack Turner	(England) Staines Town	13 June 2012	
8 May 2012	MF	(Wales) Reece Jones	(England) Sutton United		
15 May 2012	DF	(England) Sam Hatton	(England) Grimsby Town	23 June 2012	

== Awards ==
- Big Society Award
  - Winners
- BBC London Sports Awards Team of the Year
  - Winners
- Football League Family Excellence Award
  - Winners
- Football League Award for Community Promotion of the Girls/Kids Cup
  - Winners
