= 2011 Conference Premier play-off final =

- Event: 2010–11 Football Conference
AFC Wimbledon	Luton Town
0	0
- AFC Wimbledon won 4–3 on penalties
- Date: 21 May 2011
- Venue: Etihad Stadium, Manchester
- Referee: James Adcock
- Attendance: 18,195

The 2011 Conference Premier play-off final, known as the 2011 Blue Square Bet Premier play-off final for sponsorship purposes, was a football match between AFC Wimbledon and Luton Town on 21 May 2011 at the Etihad Stadium in Manchester. It was the ninth Conference Premier play-off final and was played in Manchester due to a conflict with the UEFA Champions League final. AFC Wimbledon won the match 4–3 in a penalty shoot-out following a 0–0 draw after extra time to secure promotion to League Two, thus entering the Football League for the first time in the club's nine-year history.

== Match ==
=== Details ===
21 May 2011
15:00 BST

AFC Wimbledon	0–0 (a.e.t.)	Luton Town
	Report
Penalties
Hatton (penalty scored); L. Moore (penalty scored); Mohamed (penalty missed); Yakubu (penalty scored); Kedwell (penalty scored)	4–3	(penalty missed) Lawless; (penalty scored) Pilkington; (penalty scored) Newton; (penalty missed) Walker; (penalty scored) Howells

Wembley Stadium, London
Attendance: 18,195
Referee: James Adcock

AFC Wimbledon	Luton Town

GK	1	Seb Brown
RB	7	Sam Hatton
CB	28	Jamie Stuart
CB	6	Brett Johnson	(yellow card) 33'
LB	29	Gareth Gwillim		(substituted off) 61'
CM	4	Steven Gregory		(substituted off) 94'
CM	8	Ricky Wellard		(substituted off) 67'
CM	23	Rashid Yussuff
FW	9	Danny Kedwell (c)
FW	39	Kaid Mohamed
FW	11	Luke Moore	(yellow card) 80'
Substitutes:
GK	20	Jack Turner
DF	5	Ismail Yakubu		(substituted on) 61'
MF	12	Christian Jolley
MF	14	Lee Minshull	Booked	(substituted on) 94'
MF	26	James Mulley		(substituted on) 67'
Manager:
Terry Brown

GK	1	Mark Tyler
RB	2	Dan Gleeson
CB	13	Zdeněk Kroča
CB	6	George Pilkington (c)
LB	16	Ed Asafu-Adjaye
RM	18	Claude Gnakpa		(substituted off) 95'
CM	14	Alex Lawless	(yellow card) 54'
CM	15	Jake Howells
CM	4	Keith Keane	(yellow card) 45'
LM	11	Robbie Willmott		(substituted off) 61'
FW	23	Jason Walker
Substitutes:
GK	30	Kevin Pilkington
DF	5	Luke Graham
MF	7	Adam Newton		(substituted on) 95'
FW	9	Matthew Barnes-Homer		(substituted on) 61'
FW	19	Danny Crow
Manager:
Gary Brabin
