= Luke Moore (footballer, born 1988) =

Footballer born 1988

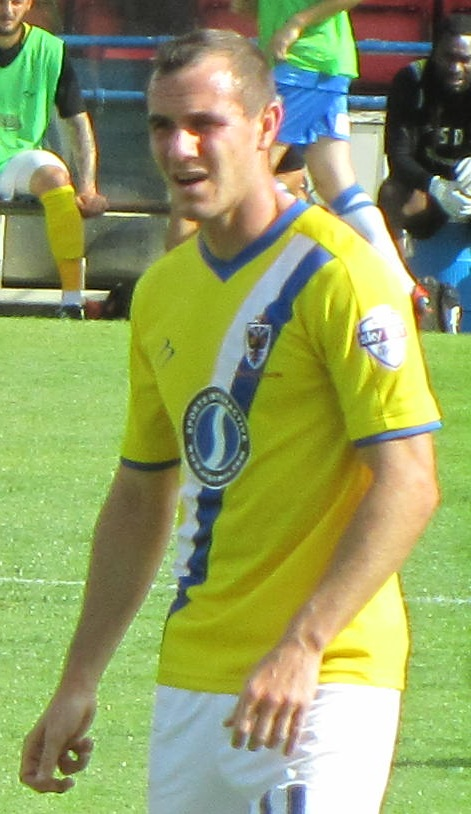
- Moore playing for AFC Wimbledon in 2013

Personal information
- Full name: Luke Robert Moore
- Date of birth: 27 April 1988 (age 38)
- Place of birth: Gravesend, England
- Position: Forward

Team information
- Current team: Dorking Wanderers
- Number: 18

Youth career
- 2004–2006: Ebbsfleet United

Senior career*
Years	Team	Apps	(Gls)
2006–2009	Ebbsfleet United	123	(20)
2009–2014	AFC Wimbledon	168	(30)
2014–2016	Margate	5	(4)
2016–2017	Billericay Town	10	(0)
2017	→ Leatherhead (loan)	8	(1)
2017–2026	Dorking Wanderers	218	(12)
2025	→ Ashford United (loan)	3	(0)

International career
2008	England C	1	(1)
- * Club domestic league appearances and goals as of 19:32, 27 April 2026 (UTC)

Luke Robert Moore (born 27 April 1988) is an English semi-professional footballer who plays for Dorking Wanderers as a forward.

Moore was part of the AFC Wimbledon squad that triumphed over Luton Town in the 2011 Conference play-off final, scoring in the penalty shoot-out to help promote "The Dons" to the Football League. He previously played for Ebbsfleet United, forming part of the squad that beat Torquay United 1–0 in the 2008 FA Trophy final. He was also the first AFC Wimbledon player to score a goal in the League Cup. He was a member of the team that played in AFC Wimbledon's inaugural Football League match against Bristol Rovers on 6 August 2011.

== Club career ==
=== Ebbsfleet United ===
Moore was born in Gravesend, Kent but brought up in Northfleet where he attended Shears Green Junior School and played football for the Gravesham Primary Schools FA. At the age of eleven he moved to Northfleet Technology College and continued to play for the Gravesham Schools FA at secondary school level. At the age of fifteen he began his professional career at his local club Gravesend and Northfleet (later known as Ebbsfleet United) which at that time competed in the Conference National. Moore spent two years playing for the youth team whilst taking part in the club's Programme for Academic and Sporting Excellence, a nationwide scheme which aims to develop young footballers on the pitch whilst also ensuring they remain in higher education. On 6 February 2006 he scored in a 2–0 win over Dover Athletic in the Kent Senior Cup, earning the 17-year–old special praise from first team manager Liam Daish. Moore was rewarded with his first professional contract on 1 July 2006. The forward made his league debut on 15 August 2006 in a 4–1 win over Tamworth. He scored his first goal in professional football on 26 August 2006, securing a 1–0 win over Forest Green Rovers. He continued his good form by scoring twice more in the following two games; the first coming in a 3–1 win over Altrincham on 28 August 2006 and the second in a 2–2 draw with Southport on 2 September 2006. He scored 7 goals in 37 appearances for Ebbsfleet United during his debut season at the club. In November 2007, Ebbsfleet United was taken over by MyFootballClub. Moore further cemented his place in the first team in the 2007–08 season, making 44 league appearances and scoring 7 goals. During this season, he also achieved FA Trophy success, playing in the 2008 FA Trophy final against Torquay United, which ended as a 1–0 victory to Ebbsfleet United, on 10 May 2008 in front of a crowd of 40,186 at Wembley Stadium. The 2008–09 season was Moore's last for Ebbsfleet United. He made 36 league appearances in which he scored 6 goals. He scored his 20th and last league goal for Ebbsfleet United in a 2–1 win over Crawley Town on 20 November 2008. At the end of the 2008–09 season, Ebbsfleet United manager Liam Daish was forced to disband the squad due to financial issues at the club which resulted in a much more restrictive playing budget for the following season.

=== AFC Wimbledon ===
Moore joined newly promoted Conference side AFC Wimbledon on a free transfer on 5 June 2009. The 21-year–old forward made his debut for AFC Wimbledon on 8 August 2009 in a 1–1 draw with Luton Town, coming on as a substitute for Derek Duncan in the 68th minute. He made his first starting appearance for "The Dons" on 15 August 2009 in a 2–1 win over Kettering Town. He scored his first goals for AFC Wimbledon in a 4–0 win over Salisbury City on 18 August 2009, opening the scoring in the 18th minute and capping the win with a second in the 90th minute, earning him a Man of the Match appraisal. He went on to score three times against his former club Ebbsfleet United in the 2009–10 season, the first goal came in a 2–2 draw on 19 September 2009 and the second two goals came in a 3–0 win on 24 November 2009. In total, he scored 7 league goals in 30 appearances in his first season with AFC Wimbledon. He also featured heavily for "The Dons" in the 2010–11 campaign, scoring 7 league goals in 33 appearances to aid "The Dons" in their push for promotion. In January 2011, Moore attracted the interest of Coventry City, but a formal bid was never made for him. He proved pivotal for "The Dons" in their 2010–11 Conference play-off semi-final matches against Fleetwood Town, scoring a goal in the First Leg on 6 May 2011 to help the Dons win 2–0. The forward also played in the Second Leg replay on 11 May 2011 which saw "The Dons" thrash Fleetwood Town 6–1. He was selected by Terry Brown to feature from the start in the 2010–11 Conference play-off final against Luton Town on 21 May 2011 at the City of Manchester Stadium in front of a crowd of 18,195. The game went down to a penalty shoot-out after the game ended 0–0 following extra time. Moore scored his penalty and AFC Wimbledon went on to triumph 4–3 after captain Danny Kedwell scored the winner, securing the club's promotion to the Football League.

As well as being a member of the squad that helped AFC Wimbledon win promotion from the Conference, Moore also became the first AFC Wimbledon player to score a goal in the Football League Cup, even though it came in a 3–2 defeat by Crawley Town on 29 July 2011. He made his Football League debut in AFC Wimbledon's inaugural Football League match against Bristol Rovers on 6 August 2011, which ultimately ended as a 3–2 defeat. He made 37 league appearances and scored 11 league goals for AFC Wimbledon during the 2011–12 season. He made his 100th appearance for the Dons in a 3–1 win over Shrewsbury Town on 5 May 2012, in which he scored twice. He scored his 25th league goal for the club in a 3–1 win over Southend United on 12 March 2013. The forward added to his tally for the 2012–13 League Two campaign when he scored both goals in a 2–2 draw with Exeter City on 13 April 2013, salvaging a crucial point for "The Dons" which would help them avoid relegation at the end of the 2012–13 season. As a result of his good performance, he received recognition by being named in the League Two 'Team of the Week'. Having helped AFC Wimbledon secure their Football League status following a 2–1 victory over Fleetwood Town on 27 April 2013, even though the club started the day in the relegation zone, Moore was awarded the Players' Player of the Year Award for his contributions throughout the season. On 25 June 2013, it was announced that he had signed a contract extension with AFC Wimbledon for an undisclosed length.

=== Non-league spells ===
Following his release from AFC Wimbledon, Moore joined Isthmian League Premier Division side Margate in May 2014. Following a three-year spell with the Kent-based side, Moore opted to join Billericay Town for the 2016–17 campaign. Moore then went on to is sign for Dorking Wanderers that same year. On May 21, 2022, in a National League South play-off final game against Ebbsfleet United, Moore scored a dramatic goal in the 99th-minute of injury-time which drew the game for Dorking as they were on the verge of staying in the same division once again. His team-mate, Alfie Rutherford later on scored in the 98th-minute of the first extra-time to make it 3-2 for Dorking as they were eventually promoted to the National League for the very first time. In January 2025, Moore joined Isthmian League South East Division club Ashford United on an initial one-month loan deal.

On 27 April 2026, it was announced that Moore would retire following the conclusion of the 2025–26 season.

== International career ==
Moore was called up to represent the England C team on 16 September 2008 in a 6–2 defeat by the Bosnia and Herzegovina B team. He scored one of the consolation goals for England after an assist was provided by Luke Foster. The 20-year–old forward became the first player to be developed in Ebbsfleet United's Programme for Academic and Sporting Excellence (PASE) to be called up to the international stage.

== Career statistics ==
As of 26 April 2014

Appearances and goals by club, season and competition
Club	Season	League			FA Cup		League Cup		Other		Total	
Club	Season	Division	Apps	Goals	Apps	Goals	Apps	Goals	Apps	Goals	Apps	Goals
Ebbsfleet United	2006–07	Conference	37	7	0	0	0	0	0	0	37	7
Ebbsfleet United	2007–08	Conference	44	7	0	0	0	0	4 (Note: Appearances in FA Trophy)	0	48	7
Ebbsfleet United	2008–09	Conference	36	6	0	0	0	0	3	0	39	6
Ebbsfleet United	Total		117	20	0	0	0	0	7	0	124	20
AFC Wimbledon	2009–10	Conference	31	7	1	0	0	0	0	0	32	7
AFC Wimbledon	2010–11	Conference	33	7	4	0	0	0	5 (Note: Two appearances in FA Trophy, three appearances in Conference play-offs)	1	42	8
AFC Wimbledon	2011–12	League Two	37	9	2	1	1	1	0	0	40	11
AFC Wimbledon	2012–13	League Two	35	4	2	0	1	0	0	0	38	4
AFC Wimbledon	2013–14	League Two	33	3	1	0	1	1	0	0	35	4
AFC Wimbledon	Total		169	30	10	1	3	2	5	1	187	34
Career total			286	50	10	1	3	2	12	1	311	54

== Honours ==
Ebbsfleet United

- FA Trophy: 2007–08

AFC Wimbledon

- Conference Premier play-offs: 2011

Dorking Wanderers

- Isthmian League Premier Division: 2018–19
- National League South play-offs: 2021–22
