= Ulysse Ndong =

Gabonese footballer (born 1992)

Ulysse Obame-Ndong
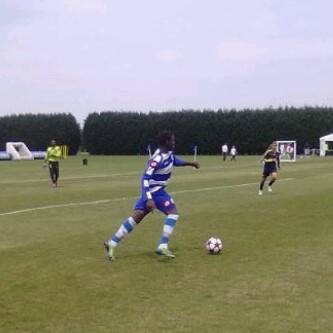

Personal information
- Full name: Ulysse Daryl Obame-Ndong
- Date of birth: 24 November 1992 (age 33)
- Place of birth: Paris, France
- Height: 1.75 m (5 ft 9 in)
- Position: Defensive midfielder

Youth career
- RC Paris
- 2008–2010: Amiens SC
- 2010: Queens Park Rangers
- 2010–2012: AFC Wimbledon
- 2012–2013: Alki Larnaca

Senior career*
Years	Team	Apps	(Gls)
2013–2015	Othellos Athienou	54	(0)
2015–2016	Ermis Aradippou	23	(0)
2016–2017	Lokomotiv GO	20	(0)
2017	Slavia Sofia	11	(0)
2018	Vereya	9	(0)
2018	Al-Khor	3	(0)
2020	Akritas Chlorakas	7	(0)
2020–2021	Al-Nojoom	25	(4)
2021–2022	Dhofar	8	(0)

International career^{‡}
2016–2018	Gabon	7	(0)
- * Club domestic league appearances and goals as of 2 August 2023 ‡ National team caps and goals as of 2 August 2023

Ulysse Ndong (born 24 November 1992) is a professional footballer who plays as a midfielder. Born in France, he played for the Gabon national team.

== Club career ==
Ulysse Obame-Ndong started his career playing as goalkeeper and he joined with his first professional football club at the age of 16 when he joined Amiens SC from a very mythical club of Racing Club de France Colombes 92. Two years later, he went on trials to London for Queens Park Rangers F.C. where he stayed two months before joining AFC Wimbledon where he played with young talents such as Huw Johnson, Jim Fenlon. In October 2012, Ulysse joined Alki Larnaca F.C. as a free agent. In June 2013, he moved to Othellos Athienou.

On 16 October 2016, Ndong joined Bulgarian First League side Lokomotiv Gorna Oryahovitsa but he left the club in July 2017.

On 1 September 2017, Ndong signed with Slavia Sofia.

On 1 July 2018, Ndong signed with Qatari club Al-Khor for two years. On 10 January 2020, he returned to Cyprus and joined Akritas Chlorakas. On 23 October 2020, Ndong signed with Saudi club Al-Nojoom for one year.

== International career ==
Ndong is born in France to Gabonese parents. He was called up to the Gabon national football team for a set of 2017 Africa Cup of Nations qualification matches and made his debut in a 1–0 loss against Sierra Leone.

== Career statistics ==
=== Club ===
As of 11 December 2017.

Club	Season	League			Cup		Europe		Other		Total	
Club	Season	Division	Apps	Goals	Apps	Goals	Apps	Goals	Apps	Goals	Apps	Goals
Othellos Athienou	2013–14	Cypriot Second Division	27	0	0	0	0	0	0	0	27	0
Othellos Athienou	2014–15	Cypriot First Division	27	0	3	0	0	0	0	0	30	0
Ermis Aradippou	2015–16	Cypriot First Division	23	0	2	0	0	0	0	0	25	0
Lokomotiv GO	2016–17	Bulgarian First League	20	0	0	0	0	0	4 (Note: Relegation Play-offs)	0	24	0
Slavia Sofia	2017–18	Bulgarian First League	11	0	2	0	0	0	0	0	13	0
Career total			108	0	7	0	0	0	4	0	119	0
