= Callum McNaughton =

English footballer (born 1991)

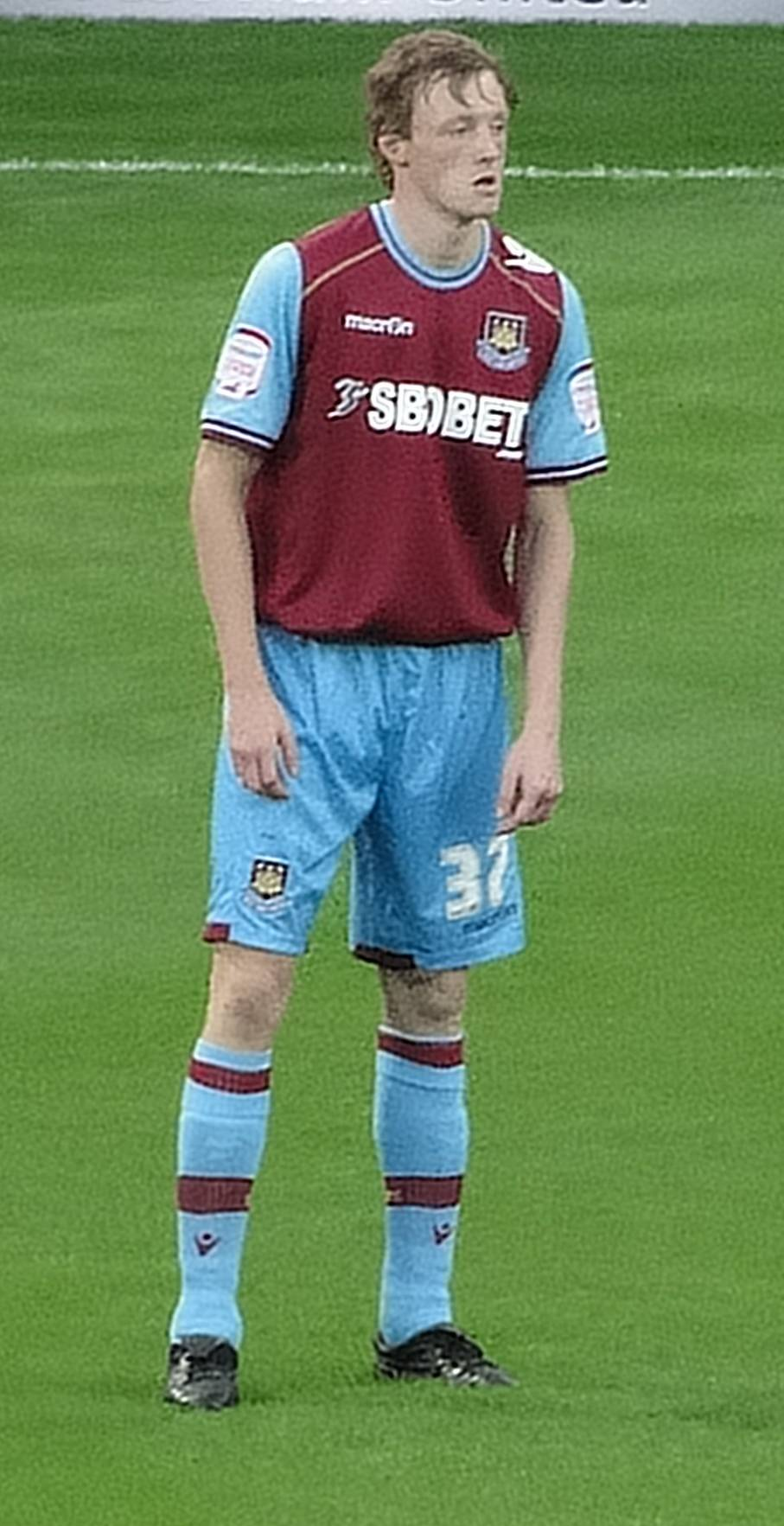
- McNaughton playing for West Ham United

Personal information
- Full name: Callum James McNaughton
- Date of birth: 25 October 1991 (age 35)
- Place of birth: Harlow, England
- Position: Defender

Youth career
- 2006–2010: West Ham United

Senior career*
Years	Team	Apps	(Gls)
2010–2012	West Ham United	0	(0)
2011	→ Bishop's Stortford (loan)	9	(2)
2011–2012	→ AFC Wimbledon (loan)	14	(0)
2012–2013	AFC Wimbledon	5	(0)
2012–2013	→ Kingstonian (loan)	6	(0)
2013	Kingstonian	1	(0)
2013–2014	Bishop's Stortford	40	(1)
2014	Welling United	0	(0)
2014	Thamesmead Town		
2014	Maldon & Tiptree	1	(0)
2014–2015	Bromley	16	(0)
2015–2016	Dartford	30	(1)
2016–2017	Hampton & Richmond Borough		
2017	Tooting & Mitcham United		
- * Club domestic league appearances and goals

Callum James McNaughton (born 25 October 1991) is an English retired footballer who is a coach at Juventus Academy Boston.

== Club career ==
=== West Ham United ===
Starting as a youth team player with West Ham aged 14, McNaughton signed professionally in 2010. After a loan period with Bishop's Stortford in 2011 he made his debut and was sent-off in West Ham's 2–1 home defeat to Aldershot Town in the League Cup on 24 August 2011.

=== AFC Wimbledon ===
On 9 September 2011, McNaughton joined League Two club AFC Wimbledon on a month-long loan. He made his debut on 10 September against Aldershot Town in a 1–1 away draw. He was praised by AFC Wimbledon manager Terry Brown for his commanding performance at the back. In January 2012 McNaughton signed for AFC Wimbledon on a permanent contract. On 7 December 2012, McNaughton was loaned to Kingstonian on a one-month deal. He made his debut on 8 December 2012 in a 1–0 win over Bognor Regis Town.

=== Kingstonian ===
On 1 February 2013, McNaughton signed permanently for Isthmian League club Kingstonian after a successful loan spell. Having made a total of seven appearances for the club during his loan and permanent spells McNaughton and Kingstonian parted ways.

=== Bishop's Stortford ===
McNaughton re-joined Conference South side Bishop's Stortford on 15 June 2013.

=== Bromley ===
After injury plagued McNaughton's move to Welling United, he joined lower division side Maldon & Tiptree briefly. After making one league appearance, he returned to the Conference South with Bromley. He made his debut for the club in a 1–1 Kent Senior Cup draw with Maidstone United. His league debut came on 1 November, in a 4–1 away win over Eastbourne Borough.

=== Dartford ===
In June 2015, McNaughton signed for newly relegated National League South side Dartford on a free transfer. He left Dartford at the end of the season having made 30 league appearances and scoring one goal.

== Coaching career ==
Following his playing career, McNaughton began coaching at Juventus' satellite academy in Boston, United States.

== Personal life ==
McNaughton attended Hockerill Anglo-European College.

== Career statistics ==
As of match played 18 April 2015.

Club statistics
Club	Season	League			FA Cup		League Cup		Other		Total	
Club	Season	Division	Apps	Goals	Apps	Goals	Apps	Goals	Apps	Goals	Apps	Goals
Bishop's Stortford (loan)	2010–11	Conference South	9	2	—		—		—		0	0
West Ham United	2011–12	Championship	0	0	—		1	0	—		0	0
AFC Wimbledon (loan)	2011–12	League Two	14	0	0	0	—		2 (Note: Appearances in Football League Trophy)	0	16	0
AFC Wimbledon	2011–12	League Two	4	0	—		—		—		4	0
AFC Wimbledon	2012–13	League Two	1	0	0	0	0	0	0	0	1	0
AFC Wimbledon	Total		19	0	0	0	0	0	2	0	21	0
Bishop's Stortford	2013–14	Conference South	40	1	4	0	—		1 (Note: Appearance in FA Trophy)	0	45	1
Maldon & Tiptree	2014–15	Isthmian League Division One North	1	0	—		—		1	0	2	0
Bromley	2014–15	Conference South	14	0	1	0	—		—		15	0
Career total			83	3	5	0	1	0	4	0	93	3
