= Ricky Wellard =

English footballer

Personal information
- Full name: Ricky Ben Wellard
- Date of birth: 9 May 1988 (age 38)
- Place of birth: Hammersmith, England
- Position: Midfielder

Team information
- Current team: AFC Bournemouth (coach)

Senior career*
Years	Team	Apps	(Gls)
2005–2009	Ashford Town		
2009–2012	AFC Wimbledon	79	(4)
2011	→ Cambridge United (loan)	9	(0)
2012–2013	Cambridge United	17	(1)
2012	→ Salisbury City (loan)	3	(1)
2013–2014	Salisbury City	46	(1)
2014–2015	Sutton United	30	(3)
2015–2016	Welling United	28	(1)
2016	Hemel Hempstead Town	12	(1)
2016–2018	Wealdstone	61	(6)
2018–2019	Hampton & Richmond Borough	30	(0)
2019	Salisbury	2	(0)
2019–2022	Bedfont Sports	31	(6)
2023–	Farnham Town		
- * Club domestic league appearances and goals

Ricky Ben Wellard (born 9 May 1988) is an English former professional footballer who is the U16 Head Coach at AFC Bournemouth.

== Career ==
=== Ashford Town (Middlesex) ===
Wellard was born in Hammersmith, London. He came through the ranks of the Ashford Town (Middlesex) and made his debut for the Tangerines against Stourport Swifts on 8 January 2005, as a late sub for Anthony Eggington. He went on to make 190 first team appearances for Ashford Town including scoring the winning goal in the 2009 Surrey Senior Cup final. During his time at the club Wellard was also groundsman at Short Lane. In the summer of 2008, AFC Wimbledon had a transfer bid rejected which was described as 'derisory' by the Ashford board. However, the Dons second bid the following summer was more successful for an undisclosed fee plus add-ons. At the time of the transfer, Wellard was one of only three players to have ever commanded a transfer fee at Ashford, with the others being Dannie Bulman and Richard Butler.

=== AFC Wimbledon ===
Wellard became a regular in the AFC Wimbledon side and made 43 appearances in his first season for the Dons as they didn't quite make the Conference play-offs. His second season at the club saw him move down the pecking order in central midfield in January after the arrival of James Mulley. In February 2011, Wellard was sent on loan to fellow Conference side Cambridge United on a month-long loan. However, he was recalled early from his loan by Terry Brown due to an injury crisis at the Kingsmeadow Stadium. He regained his place in the Dons' first team and eventually played in the 2011 Conference Play-off final win over Luton Town, which saw the Dons gain a place in the Football League. In May 2012, Wellard was released from the club due to the expiry of his contract.

=== Cambridge United ===
Wellard signed a two-year contract with The U's on 18 May 2012 following his release from AFC Wimbledon earlier in the month. U's boss Jez George was quick to snap up the midfielder early in the summer transfer window in a deal which saw the Londoner return to the Abbey Stadium on a permanent basis following a popular loan spell back in February 2011.

In November 2012, he joined Conference South side Salisbury City on a one-month loan deal.

=== Salisbury City ===
After a successful loan spell at Salisbury, he returned permanently, signing a contract until the end of the 2013–14 season. He featured in the squad regularly, and scored a vital free kick in the Conference South play-off final against Dover Athletic.

=== Sutton United ===
He signed for Sutton United in July 2014, and made his debut against Winchester City in a pre-season friendly.

=== Welling United ===
In May 2015, he signed for National League side Welling United on a free transfer.

=== Wealdstone ===
In 2016, he signed for Wealdstone. He left the club in May 2018.

=== Bedfont ===
On 25 December 2019, Wellard moved to Bedfont Sports.

=== Farnham Town ===
In July 2023, Wellard joined Combined Counties Football League Premier Division South club Farnham Town. Alongside his later work in academies, Wellard has also been involved with AF Global’s Trinity Elite football programme in the South West.

== Career statistics ==
As of match played on 9 December 2017

Appearances and goals by club, season and competition
Club	Season	League			FA Cup		League Cup		Other		Total	
Club	Season	Division	Apps	Goals	Apps	Goals	Apps	Goals	Apps	Goals	Apps	Goals
AFC Wimbledon	2009–10	Conference Premier	32	1	2	0	—		3 (Note: Appearances in FA Trophy)	1	37	2
AFC Wimbledon	2010–11	Conference Premier	25	2	4	0	—		5 (Note: Two appearances in FA Trophy, three in Conference Premier play-offs)	0	34	2
AFC Wimbledon	2011–12	League Two	22	1	3	0	1	0	2 (Note: Appearances in Football League Trophy)	0	28	1
AFC Wimbledon	Total		79	4	9	0	1	0	10	1	99	5
Cambridge United (loan)	2010–11	Conference Premier	9	0	—		—		—		9	0
Cambridge United	2012–13	Conference Premier	17	1	1	0	—		0	0	18	1
Cambridge United	Total		26	1	1	0	—		0	0	27	1
Salisbury City	2012–13	Conference South	18	1	—		—		4 (Note: One appearance in FA Trophy, three appearances and one goal in Conference South play-offs)	1	22	2
Salisbury City	2013–14	Conference Premier	31	1	1	0	—		1	0	33	1
Salisbury City	Total		49	2	1	0	—		5	1	55	3
Sutton United	2014–15	Conference South	30	3	0	0	—		1	0	31	3
Welling United	2015–16	National League	28	1	4	1	—		2	1	34	3
Hemel Hempstead Town	2015–16	National League South	12	1	0	0	—		0	0	12	1
Wealdstone	2016–17	National League South	36	3	1	0	—		0	0	37	3
Wealdstone	2017–18	National League South	12	0	0	0	—		2	1	14	1
Wealdstone	Total		48	3	1	0	0	0	2	1	51	4
Bedfont Sports	2019–20	Isthmian League South Central	8	0	—		—		2 (Note: Two appearances in Middlesex Senior Challenge Cup)	0	10	0
Bedfont Sports	2020–21	Isthmian League South Central	3	0	2	0	—		0	0	5	0
Bedfont Sports	2021–22	Isthmian League South Central	20	6	4	2	—		0	0	24	8
Bedfont Sports	Total		31	6	6	2	0	0	2	0	39	8
Career total			303	21	22	3	1	0	22	4	348	28

== Honours ==
AFC Wimbledon

- Conference Premier play-offs: 2010–11

Salisbury City

- Conference South play-offs: 2012–13
