= Chris Bush (English footballer) =

English footballer

Personal information
- Full name: Christopher Miles Bush
- Date of birth: 12 June 1992 (age 34)
- Place of birth: Whipps Cross, England
- Height: 1.91 m (6 ft 3 in)
- Position: Defender

Team information
- Current team: Boreham Wood
- Number: 5

Youth career
- Thurrock
- 2008–2010: Brentford

Senior career*
Years	Team	Apps	(Gls)
2010–2011	Brentford	0	(0)
2010	→ Salisbury City (loan)	7	(0)
2010	→ Woking (loan)	4	(0)
2010–2011	→ AFC Wimbledon (loan)	13	(0)
2011	→ Thurrock (loan)	8	(0)
2011–2012	AFC Wimbledon	22	(0)
2012–2013	Gateshead	20	(1)
2013	→ Lincoln City (loan)	3	(1)
2013	→ Hereford United (loan)	6	(0)
2013–2014	Hereford United	42	(3)
2014–2015	Welling United	33	(4)
2015–2016	Lincoln City	31	(1)
2016–2017	Chelmsford City	37	(1)
2017–2019	Ebbsfleet United	77	(6)
2019–2022	Bromley	121	(8)
2022–	Boreham Wood	98	(3)

International career
2024	England C	1	(0)
- * Club domestic league appearances and goals as of 17:10, 1 May 2025 (UTC)

Christopher Miles Bush (born 12 June 1992) is an English professional footballer who plays as a defender for Boreham Wood.

== Early life ==
Bush was born in Leytonstone, Greater London.

== Club career ==
Bush came through the youth system of Brentford and spent a loan spell during the 2009–10 season with Conference side Salisbury City. At the start of the 2010–11 season he spent a month on loan at Conference South team Woking. As soon as his loan spell finished at Woking, Bush was again sent out on loan, this time to Conference National side AFC Wimbledon for four months until January 2011. He also spent time on loan at Thurrock.

In June 2011, Bush signed permanently for the newly promoted Dons side in League Two after rejecting a new contract at Griffin Park. During his time at Kingsmeadow he scored what his manager Terry Brown described as a "ridiculous own goal" as the Dons were thrashed 5–2 by Crawley Town on 22 October 2011.

On 21 June 2012, Bush signed for Gateshead. On 8 January 2013, Bush joined Lincoln City on a one-month loan. On 28 March 2013, Bush joined Hereford United on loan for the remainder of the 2012–13 season. On 25 April 2013, Bush was one of seven players released by Gateshead.

On 19 June 2013, Bush signed a one-year contract with Hereford United.

On 11 June 2014, Bush signed a one-year contract with Welling United.

In May 2015 he left Welling United and signed for Lincoln City.

On 26 June 2016, Bush dropped down a division to join National League South club Chelmsford City. On 6 August 2016, Bush scored on his debut for Chelmsford in a 2–2 draw against Truro City.

On 25 August 2017, Bush signed for Ebbsfleet United.

He moved to Bromley in May 2019. On 28 September 2019, following an injury to goalkeeper Mark Cousins, Bush played in goal for the rest of the match against Yeovil Town as there was no substitute goalkeeper. He conceded three goals in a 3–1 loss.

He left Bromley and signed for Boreham Wood on 31 December 2022.

== International career ==
Bush was called up to represent the England C team in March 2024. On 19 March, he made his debut in the 1–0 defeat to the Wales C team at Stebonheath Park.

== Career statistics ==
As of 18 May 2025

Appearances and goals by club, season and competition
Club	Season	League			FA Cup		League Cup		Other		Total	
Club	Season	Division	Apps	Goals	Apps	Goals	Apps	Goals	Apps	Goals	Apps	Goals
Brentford	2010–11	League One	0	0	—		0	0	0	0	0	0
Salisbury City (loan)	2009–10	Conference Premier	7	0	—		—		2 (Note: Appearance(s) in FA Trophy)	0	9	0
Woking (loan)	2010–11	Conference South	4	0	—		—		—		4	0
AFC Wimbledon (loan)	2010–11	Conference Premier	13	0	1	0	—		1	0	15	0
Thurrock (loan)	2010–11	Conference South	8	0	—		—		—		8	0
AFC Wimbledon	2011–12	League Two	22	0	3	0	1	0	2 (Note: Appearance in Football League Trophy)	0	28	0
Gateshead	2012–13	Conference Premier	20	1	1	0	—		1	0	22	1
Lincoln City (loan)	2012–13	Conference Premier	3	1	—		—		—		3	1
Hereford United	2012–13	Conference Premier	6	0	—		—		—		6	0
Hereford United	2013–14	Conference Premier	42	3	1	0	—		0	0	43	3
Hereford United	Total		48	3	1	0	—		0	0	49	3
Welling United	2014–15	Conference Premier	33	4	0	0	—		2	0	35	4
Lincoln City	2015–16	National League	31	1	3	0	—		1	0	35	1
Chelmsford City	2016–17	National League South	32	1	1	0	—		4	0	37	1
Chelmsford City	2017–18	National League South	5	0	—		—		—		5	0
Chelmsford City	Total		37	1	1	0	—		4	0	42	1
Ebbsfleet United	2017–18	National League	34	1	3	0	—		3	0	40	1
Ebbsfleet United	2018–19	National League	43	5	3	0	—		0	0	46	5
Ebbsfleet United	Total		77	6	6	0	—		3	0	86	6
Bromley	2019–20	National League	34	4	3	1	—		0	0	37	5
Bromley	2020–21	National League	36	1	2	0	—		3 (Note: Two appearances in FA Trophy, one appearance in National League play-offs)	0	41	1
Bromley	2021–22	National League	41	3	2	0	—		6	0	49	3
Bromley	2022–23	National League	10	0	1	0	—		0	0	11	0
Bromley	Total		121	8	8	1	—		9	0	138	9
Boreham Wood	2022–23	National League	24	1	—		—		2 (Note: Two appearances in National League play-offs)	0	26	1
Boreham Wood	2023–24	National League	39	1	2	0	—		1	0	42	1
Boreham Wood	2024–25	National League South	35	1	2	0	—		7 (Note: Four appearances in FA Trophy, three appearances in National League South play-offs)	0	44	1
Boreham Wood	Total		98	3	4	0	—		10	0	112	3
Career total			522	28	28	1	1	0	35	0	586	29

== Honours ==
Bromley

- FA Trophy: 2021–22

Boreham Wood

- National League South play-offs: 2025
