= Max Porter (footballer) =

English footballer and coach

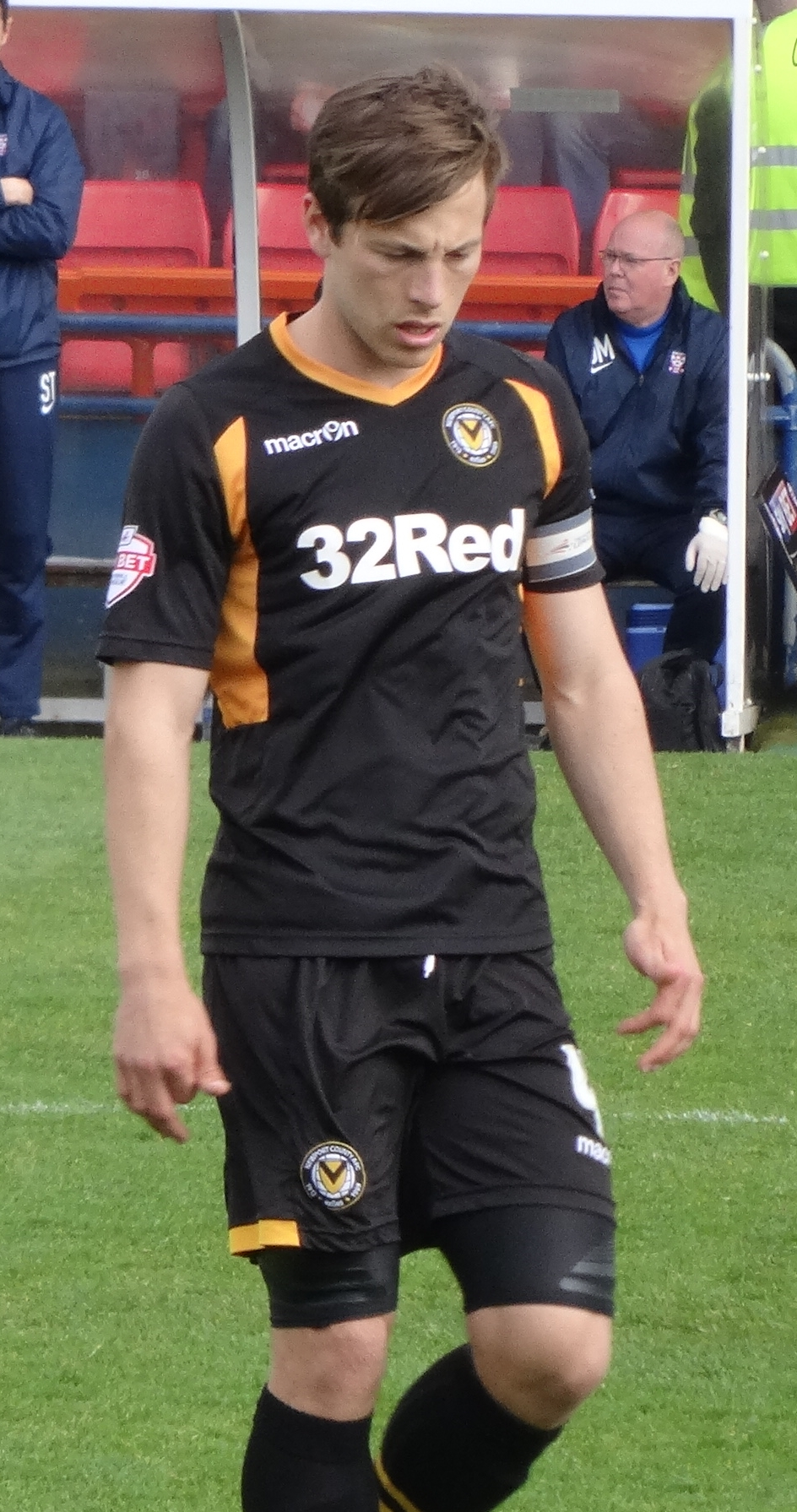
- Porter playing for Newport County in 2014

Personal information
- Full name: Max Porter
- Date of birth: 29 June 1987 (age 39)
- Place of birth: Hornchurch, England
- Height: 6 ft 0 in (1.83 m)
- Position: Midfielder

Team information
- Current team: Stoke City (assistant manager)

Youth career
- Tottenham Hotspur
- Southend United
- Gillingham
- Brighton & Hove Albion
- –2005: Southend United

Senior career*
| Years | Team | Apps | (Gls) |
| 2005–2006 | Cambridge United | 8 | (0) |
| 2006–2007 | Bishop's Stortford | 42 | (8) |
| 2007–2009 | Barnet | 56 | (1) |
| 2009–2011 | Rushden & Diamonds | 87 | (7) |
| 2011–2012 | AFC Wimbledon | 15 | (1) |
| 2012 | → Newport County (loan) | 13 | (0) |
| 2012–2015 | Newport County | 75 | (4) |
| 2015–2016 | Bromley | 22 | (1) |
| 2016–2019 | Chelmsford City | 55 | (1) |
| 2018 | → Maldon & Tiptree (loan) | 5 | (0) |
| Total | | 378 | (23) |

International career
| 2009–2010 | England C | 3 | (2) |

Managerial career
- 2025–2026: Arsenal U21
- * Club domestic league appearances and goals

Max Porter (born 29 June 1987) is an English former professional footballer who is currently assistant manager at Stoke City.

A midfielder, Porter represented nine clubs in the English football pyramid, notably being part of the Newport County side which won promotion from the Football Conference to the Football League in 2013.

== Playing career ==
Porter was part of the Tottenham Hotspur and Southend United set-ups in his youth before signing a professional contract with Cambridge United in 2005. however, he stayed for only eight games before moving to Bishop's Stortford, where he saw more game time. His good form for the Blues attracted the attention of Barnet boss Paul Fairclough, who signed Porter in May 2007. He spent two seasons with Barnet. Still, in April 2009 he was told he would be released at the end of the season. In May 2009, Porter signed a one-year contract with Conference National side Rushden & Diamonds, and played in almost every league game as the Diamonds reached the play-offs. Porter's good club form also earned him a call up to the England C team, for whom he played three games, scoring twice. Porter agreed to a one-year extension to his Rushden contract at the beginning of June 2010.

In June 2011, following Rushden's dissolution, Porter signed for League Two club AFC Wimbledon. On 10 September, he scored his first goal for the club in an away game against Aldershot Town.

In February 2012 Porter signed for Newport County on loan. On 12 May 2012 he played for Newport in the FA Trophy Final at Wembley Stadium which Newport lost 2–0 to York City. In May 2012, Porter was released from AFC Wimbledon at the end of his contract. In June 2012 Porter signed a permanent contract with Newport County.

In the 2012–13 season he was part of the Newport team that finished third in the league, reaching the Conference National play-offs. Newport County won the play-off final 2–0 versus Wrexham at Wembley to return to the Football League after a 25-year absence with promotion to League Two.

He was released by Newport in May 2015 at the end of his contract, and on 27 May 2015 he joined Conference Premier club Bromley.

On 3 October 2016, it was announced that Porter's contract with Bromley had been terminated by mutual consent.

The day after he left Bromley, Porter joined National League South side Chelmsford City. On 16 May 2018, following a short loan move to Maldon & Tiptree, Porter extended his stay at Chelmsford, taking up a player-coach role in the process.

== Coaching career ==
On 17 August 2019, Chelmsford announced the retirement of Porter, who took up a full time coaching role at Arsenal's under-13 team. Since then Porter has been U14 Head Coach and Lead Phase before being promoted to Professional Development Phase U18 assistant coach & U17 Head Coach.In July 2022 Porter was promoted to U21 Assistant Coach. In the 2024-25 season, Porter was appointed as head coach of the Arsenal under-19 team playing in the UEFA Youth League alongside his role of U21 assistant coach. Porter is an UEFA PRO Licence qualified coach as of December 2025 with the FAW. In August 2025 Porter was promoted to U21 Head Coach at Arsenal. Across his time at Arsenal he has helped develop such players like Myles Lewis-Skelly, Ethan Nwaneri, Max Dowman, Tommy Setford and Marli Salmon who have all progressed into the Arsenal first team.

In June 2026 Porter, was appointed assistant manager to Mark Robins at Stoke City.

== Career statistics ==
Appearances and goals by club, season and competition
| Club | Season | League | | | FA Cup | | League Cup | | Other | | Total | |
| Club | Season | Division | Apps | Goals | Apps | Goals | Apps | Goals | Apps | Goals | Apps | Goals |
|---|---|---|---|---|---|---|---|---|---|---|---|---|
| Cambridge United | 2005–06 | Conference National | 8 | 0 | 0 | 0 | — | | 1 (Note: Appearances in Football League Trophy) | 0 | 9 | 0 |
| Bishops Stortford | 2006–07 | Conference South | 42 | 8 | | | — | | | | 42 | 8 |
| Barnet | 2007–08 | League Two | 30 | 1 | 4 | 0 | 1 | 0 | 1 | 0 | 36 | 1 |
| Barnet | 2008–09 | League Two | 26 | 0 | 2 | 0 | 1 | 0 | 1 | 0 | 30 | 0 |
| Barnet | Total | | 56 | 1 | 6 | 0 | 2 | 0 | 2 | 0 | 66 | 1 |
| Rushden & Diamonds | 2009–10 | Conference Premier | 43 | 3 | 3 | 0 | — | | 4 (Note: Two appearances in FA Trophy and two in Conference Premier play-offs) | 0 | 50 | 3 |
| Rushden & Diamonds | 2010–11 | Conference Premier | 43 | 4 | 2 | 0 | — | | 1 (Note: Appearances in FA Trophy) | 0 | 46 | 4 |
| Rushden & Diamonds | Total | | 86 | 7 | 5 | 0 | 0 | 0 | 5 | 0 | 96 | 7 |
| AFC Wimbledon | 2011–12 | League Two | 15 | 1 | 2 | 0 | 1 | 0 | 2 | 0 | 20 | 1 |
| Newport County (loan) | 2011–12 | Conference Premier | 13 | 0 | — | | — | | 3 | 0 | 16 | 0 |
| Newport County | 2012–13 | Conference Premier | 26 | 2 | 2 | 0 | — | | 1 | 0 | 29 | 2 |
| Newport County | 2013–14 | League Two | 22 | 1 | 0 | 0 | 0 | 0 | 0 | 0 | 22 | 1 |
| Newport County | 2014–15 | League Two | 27 | 1 | 0 | 0 | 0 | 0 | 0 | 0 | 27 | 1 |
| Newport County | Total | | 75 | 4 | 2 | 0 | 0 | 0 | 1 | 0 | 78 | 4 |
| Bromley | 2015–16 | National League | 10 | 0 | 0 | 0 | — | | 0 | 0 | 10 | 0 |
| Bromley | 2016–17 | National League | 12 | 1 | 0 | 0 | — | | 0 | 0 | 12 | 1 |
| Bromley | Total | | 22 | 1 | 0 | 0 | 0 | 0 | 0 | 0 | 22 | 1 |
| Chelmsford City | 2016–17 | National League South | 20 | 0 | 0 | 0 | — | | 11 (Note: Four appearances and two goals in Essex Senior Cup, four appearances in FA Trophy and three in National League South play-offs) | 2 | 31 | 2 |
| Chelmsford City | 2017–18 | National League South | 4 | 1 | 1 | 0 | — | | 0 | 0 | 5 | 1 |
| Chelmsford City | Total | | 24 | 1 | 1 | 0 | 0 | 0 | 11 | 2 | 36 | 3 |
| Career total | | | 341 | 23 | 16 | 0 | 3 | 0 | 25 | 2 | 385 | 25 |
