= Rashid Yussuff =

English footballer (born 1989)

Personal information
- Full name: Rashid Olatokunbo Oladobe Alao Yussuff
- Date of birth: 23 September 1989 (age 37)
- Place of birth: Poplar, London, England
- Position: Midfielder

Team information
- Current team: Chatham Town

Youth career
- 2006–2008: Charlton Athletic

Senior career*
| Years | Team | Apps | (Gls) |
| 2008–2009 | Charlton Athletic | 0 | (0) |
| 2008 | → Northwich Victoria (loan) | 7 | (0) |
| 2009 | → Ebbsfleet United (loan) | 8 | (1) |
| 2009–2010 | Gillingham | 7 | (0) |
| 2010–2013 | AFC Wimbledon | 101 | (12) |
| 2014 | Margate | 0 | (0) |
| 2014 | Hayes & Yeading United | 11 | (0) |
| 2014–2015 | Żebbuġ Rangers | 16 | (4) |
| 2015–2017 | Arka Gdynia | 31 | (3) |
| 2015–2017 | Arka Gdynia II | 7 | (3) |
| 2017 | ÍA Akranes | 17 | (0) |
| 2018 | Víkingur Ólafsvík | 0 | (0) |
| 2023– | Chatham Town | | |

International career
| 2004–2005 | England U16 | 4 | (0) |
| 2005–2006 | England U17 | 2 | (0) |
| 2007 | England U18 | 1 | (0) |
- * Club domestic league appearances and goals as of 09:37, 23 September 2024 (UTC)

Rashid Olatokunbo Oladobe Alao Yussuff (born 23 September 1989) is an English footballer who plays as a midfielder for Chatham Town.

== Career ==
=== Early years ===
Yussuff is of Nigerian descent but was born in Poplar, London on 23 September 1989. He is often nicknamed Toks as an abbreviation of his middle name Olatokunbo. Yussuff began his career as a trainee at Charlton Athletic Academy in July 2006 at the age of 17. He scored eight league goals for the under-18 squad in the 2007–08 Premier Academy League, as well as scoring two goals for the under-18s in the FA Youth Cup. In spite of this, however, he failed to break into the first team and on 1 November 2008 the 19-year-old midfielder was loaned out to Conference side Northwich Victoria on an initial one-month deal. Yussuff made his debut for Northwich Victoria on 8 November 2008 in a 1–0 defeat to Burton Albion. He went on to make six more appearances for "The Vics" with his last match being a 1–0 defeat to Altrincham on 26 December 2008, after which he returned to his parent club. The midfielder would make his only appearance for "The Addicks" as a 79th minute substitute for Lloyd Sam in the Third Round of the 2008–09 FA Cup in which Charlton Athletic beat Norwich City 1–0 at Carrow Road on 13 January 2009, in front of a crowd of 13,997. On 26 March 2009, Yussuff was loaned out to Conference side Ebbsfleet United for the remainder of the 2008–09 season. He made his debut for Ebbsfleet United on 31 March 2009 in a 1–0 win over Altrincham. Yussuff scored his first professional league goal for Ebbsfleet United on 13 April 2009 in a 2–1 victory over Lewes. Yussuff made 8 league appearances for "The Fleet" in total, the last being a 2–2 draw against Salisbury City on 26 April 2009 before returning to his parent club. Yussuff was subsequently released by Charlton Athletic at the end of the 2008–09 season.

=== Gillingham ===
Yussuff joined League One side Gillingham on trial in July 2009, impressing manager Mark Stimson enough to be awarded a one-year contract for the 2009–10 season. Yussuff made his Football League debut on 8 August 2009 as an 87th-minute substitute for Jack Payne in a 5–0 win over Swindon Town. Yussuff also came on as a second-half substitute for Jack Payne in a 1–0 defeat to Norwich City in the Second Round of the 2009–10 Football League Trophy on 6 October 2009. Yussuff would go on to make 7 more league appearances for Gillingham in the 2009–10 season, the last being a 1–1 draw against Hartlepool United on 26 January 2010. Gillingham were relegated to League Two at the end of the 2009–10 season following a 3–0 defeat by Wycombe Wanderers on 8 May 2010. This resulted in Mark Stimson being sacked on 10 May 2010. Yussuff was subsequently released by the club on 11 May after new "Gills" manager Andy Hessenthaler decided not to renew his contract.

=== AFC Wimbledon ===
On 30 June 2010, Yussuff signed for Conference side AFC Wimbledon. He made his debut for "The Dons" on 17 August 2010 as an 83rd-minute substitute for Sammy Moore in a 2–0 win over Histon. Yussuff's first starting appearance for "The Dons" came in a 1–0 defeat to Rushden & Diamonds on 24 August 2010. He scored his first goal for AFC Wimbledon in a 2–1 win over Wrexham on 9 October 2010. Yussuff was a key member of "The Dons" squad during their push for promotion, scoring 6 league goals in 40 appearances in the 2010–11 season. The midfielder's biggest honour to date for "The Dons" came when manager Terry Brown selected him to start in the 2011 Conference play-off final against Luton Town on 21 May 2011 at the City of Manchester Stadium in front of a crowd of 18,195. The match went down to a penalty shoot-out after the game ended 0–0 in extra time with AFC Wimbledon eventually winning 4–3, resulting in promotion to the football league. Yussuff will also be remembered as being part of the starting eleven in AFC Wimbledon's inaugural football league match against Bristol Rovers on 6 August 2011, which ultimately ended in a 3–2 defeat. Yussuff scored his first football league goal in a 2–0 victory over Dagenham & Redbridge on 13 August 2011. In total Yussuff scored 5 league goals in 40 appearances during the 2011–12 season. Yussuff made his 100th league appearance for AFC Wimbledon in a 1–0 win over Aldershot Town on 16 March 2013. In January 2014, Yussuff was released by AFC Wimbledon having made 150 league appearances for the club.

=== Íþróttabandalag Akraness ===
On 31 March 2017 he signed a contract with ÍA Akranes.

=== Chatham Town ===
In July 2023 Yussuff signed for Chatham Town.

== International career ==
Rashid Yussuff made his only appearance for England under-18s on 27 March 2007 in a 4–1 win over Netherlands under-18s, coming on as an 87th-minute substitute for Daniel Sturridge.

== Honours ==
AFC Wimbledon

- Conference National play-off winner: 2010–11

Arka Gdynia

- I liga: 2015–16
