= Huw Johnson =

English footballer

Personal information
- Full name: Huw Alastair Beswick Johnson
- Date of birth: 22 June 1993 (age 33)
- Place of birth: Hammersmith, London, England
- Position: Midfielder

Team information
- Current team: Hayes & Yeading United

Youth career
- Brentford
- –2012: AFC Wimbledon

Senior career*
Years	Team	Apps	(Gls)
2012–2013	AFC Wimbledon	8	(0)
2013	Staines Town	10	(1)
2013–2014	Hayes & Yeading United	5	(0)
- * Club domestic league appearances and goals

Huw Alastair Beswick Johnson (born 22 June 1993) is an English footballer who plays as a midfielder. He played in the Football League for AFC Wimbledon.

== Career ==
=== Early years ===
Johnson came into AFC Wimbledon's youth team after being released from the Brentford Academy. After a serious knee injury sidelined him for most of his second season, he became part of the first AFC Wimbledon reserve squad and was rewarded with his first professional contract in December 2011. At the end of the 2011–12 season he was named as the Reserve Team Manager's Player of the Year by Marcus Gayle.

=== AFC Wimbledon ===
Johnson's first involvement with the senior team was as an unused substitute in a match against Crewe Alexandra on 25 February 2012. The midfielder made his professional debut for "The Dons" on 5 May 2012, coming on as a substitute for Rashid Yussuff in a 3–1 win over Shrewsbury Town. Johnson made his first league start on 8 September in a 2–0 defeat against Northampton Town. He was released by AFC Wimbledon on 29 May 2013.

=== Staines Town ===
In July 2013, Johnson rejoined his former AFC Wimbledon reserve team manager Marcus Gayle at Staines Town. According to Gayle, "He has a great passing range, can use both feet and he scored 14 goals for me in our last season together. He is flexible too across a variety of positions and will be a very good asset". He was released in November and joined another Conference South club, Hayes & Yeading United, but made only five appearances before being released in March 2014.
