= Kieran Djilali =

English footballer (born 1991)

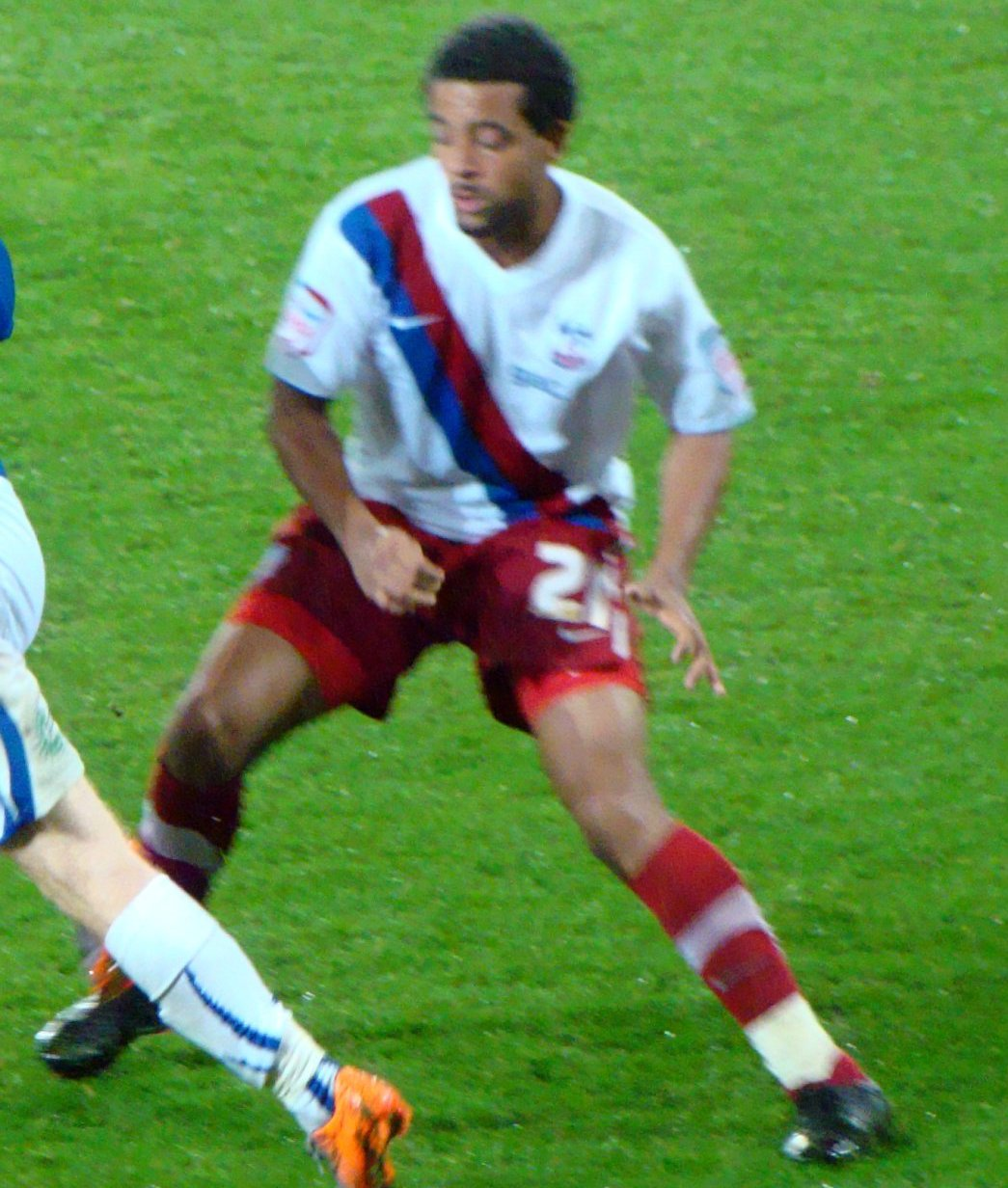
- Djilali playing for Crystal Palace in 2010

Personal information
- Full name: Kieran Stephen Larbi Allen-Djilali
- Date of birth: 1 January 1991 (age 35)
- Place of birth: Lambeth, London, England
- Height: 5 ft 9 in (1.75 m)
- Position: Midfielder

Youth career
- –2008: Crystal Palace

Senior career*
Years	Team	Apps	(Gls)
2008–2011	Crystal Palace	28	(1)
2009	→ Crawley Town (loan)	5	(0)
2009–2010	→ Chesterfield (loan)	8	(1)
2011	→ Chesterfield (loan)	10	(1)
2011–2012	AFC Wimbledon	12	(1)
2012	Portsmouth	1	(0)
2012–2013	AFC Wimbledon	5	(0)
2013–2014	Sligo Rovers	40	(7)
2014	Limerick	13	(2)
2015	Cork City	10	(2)
2016	Dulwich Hamlet	1	(0)
2016–2017	Three Bridges	14	(2)
Total		147	(17)
- * Club domestic league appearances and goals

Kieran Stephen Larbi Allen-Djilali (born 1 January 1991), more commonly known as Kieran Djilali, is an English former footballer who played as a midfielder. He played in the Football League with Crystal Palace, Chesterfield, AFC Wimbledon and Portsmouth.

== Early life ==
Djilali attended Dunraven School in Streatham.

== Club career ==
=== Crystal Palace and loans ===
Born in Lambeth, London, Djilali came through the academy at Crystal Palace, going on trial with Manchester United in mid-2007.

Djilali made his Palace debut aged 17, as a substitute in a 2–1 Football League Cup victory over Hereford United. This was followed quickly by a string of first-team appearances in which he impressed.

Djilali joined Conference Premier side Crawley Town on a month-long loan on 1 September 2009. He returned from his loan spell early in late September, having made 5 league appearances.

On 13 November, he moved on loan to League Two side Chesterfield, where he scored his first career goal in a game against Darlington on 21 November 2009. On 15 December 2009, his loan was extended by a further month.

He returned to Crystal Palace following his loan spell on 12 January 2010, and scored his first goal for Palace against Doncaster Rovers on 27 February 2010. He began the following season in Palace's first team but dropped out as manager George Burley sought to bring in more experienced players.

In February, he returned to Chesterfield for a second loan spell. On 23 March, his loan at Chesterfield was extended to 16 April. Djilali scored once in 10 matches as Chesterfield were promoted to League One at the end of the season.

When his contract at parent club Crystal Palace expired, he opted to leave Selhurst Park in the summer of 2011 to seek more game time.

=== AFC Wimbledon ===
In July 2011, Djilali played on trial for Scunthorpe United, but ended up signing for League Two club AFC Wimbledon on 26 August. On 3 September, he made his debut for the club, against Port Vale. On 10 March 2012, he scored his first goal for the club, against Dagenham & Redbridge. In May 2012, Djilali was released from the club as his contract expired.

=== Portsmouth ===
On 16 August 2012, Djilali signed a one-month contract with League One side Portsmouth. He made his debut in a 1–1 draw with Bournemouth on the opening day of the League One season, but was released after just two weeks due to Portsmouth's tight wage budget, with manager Michael Appleton putting Djilali's release down to his lack of fitness.

=== Return to AFC Wimbledon ===
On 16 November 2012, Djilali re-signed for AFC Wimbledon on a short-term deal. Manager Neal Ardley said of the move: "Kieran has been with us for a month now. He has trained well and showed a very good attitude. He has the potential to play at a higher level but first he needs to prove himself with us. With the busy winter period coming on, we thought we should augment the squad and take the chance to have a good look at him in competitive action." Djilali was released by AFC Wimbledon on 31 January 2013.

=== Sligo Rovers ===
In March 2013, Djilali signed a contract with League of Ireland champions Sligo Rovers. He made his debut on 8 March, against Derry City. On 18 March, he scored his first goal for Sligo, against Bray Wanderers. Djilali... North... ELDING

=== Limerick ===
In July 2014, Djilali signed with League of Ireland side Limerick.

=== Cork City ===
On 21 November 2014, Cork City announced the signing of Kieran Djilali from Munster rivals, Limerick ahead of the 2015 season. The winger made his debut as a substitute against former club, Sligo Rovers in a 1–1 draw at The Showgrounds. He scored his first goal for the Rebel Army after coming on late against Bray Wanderers, scoring the vital winning goal in a dramatic 1–0 victory.

Whilst at Cork, Djilali suffered a knee injury which he never fully recovered from and led to him leaving full-time football following his departure from the club.

=== Dulwich Hamlet ===
After leaving Cork City, and following a period out of the game whilst he recovered from injury, Djilali joined Dulwich Hamlet of the Isthmian League Premier Division in September 2016, going on to make his debut as a substitute against Grays Athletic in the Isthmian League Cup on 13 September 2016.

=== Three Bridges ===
After making three substitute appearances in all competitions for Dulwich Hamlet, Djilali joined Three Bridges of the Isthmian League South Division on 17 October 2016.

== After football ==
After Djilali left the League of Ireland and full-time football, he took up youth football coaching. He attained a UEFA B License and worked as a coach at Fulham's academy, and also operated his own coaching business.

== Honours ==
Chesterfield

- Football League Two (1): 2010–11

Sligo Rovers

- FAI Cup (1): 2013
- Setanta Sports Cup (1): 2014

== Statistics ==
As of 20 July 2013

Appearances and goals by club, season and competition
Club	Season	League		Cup		League Cup		Other^{[A]}		Total	
Club	Season	Apps	Goals	Apps	Goals	Apps	Goals	Apps	Goals	Apps	Goals
Crystal Palace	2008–09	6	0	0	0	2	0	–		8	0
Crystal Palace	2009–10	8	1	2	0	1	0	–		11	1
Crystal Palace	2010–11	14	0	0	0	2	0	–		16	0
Crystal Palace	Total	28	1	2	0	5	0	–		35	1
Crawley (loan)	2009–10	5	0	0	0	0	0	–		5	0
Chesterfield (loan)	2009–10	8	1	0	0	0	0	–		8	1
Chesterfield (loan)	2010–11	10	1	0	0	0	0	–		10	1
AFC Wimbledon	2011–12	12	1	1	0	0	0	1	0	14	1
Portsmouth	2012–13	1	0	0	0	0	0	–		1	0
AFC Wimbledon	2012–13	5	0	0	0	0	0	–		5	0
Sligo Rovers	2013	17	3	1	0	2	0	3	0	23	3
Career total		86	7	4	0	7	0	4	0	101	7

A. The "Other" column constitutes appearances (including substitutions) and goals in either the Football League Trophy, the Setanta Cup and the UEFA Champions League.
