= Charles Ademeno =

English footballer (born 1988)

Personal information
- Full name: Charles Adesola Oludare Oluwatosi Ademeno
- Date of birth: 12 December 1988 (age 37)
- Place of birth: Milton Keynes, England
- Height: 1.78 m (5 ft 10 in)
- Position: Striker

Youth career
- ?–2005: Southend United

Senior career*
Years	Team	Apps	(Gls)
2005–2009	Southend United	4	(0)
2006	→ Bishop's Stortford (loan)	4	(1)
2007	→ Cambridge United (loan)	6	(1)
2007	→ Welling United (loan)	8	(0)
2008	→ Rushden & Diamonds (loan)	7	(1)
2008–2009	→ Salisbury City (loan)	6	(1)
2009	→ Salisbury City (loan)	14	(5)
2009–2010	Crawley Town	32	(11)
2010–2011	Grimsby Town	12	(2)
2011–2012	AFC Wimbledon	15	(1)
2012	Eastbourne Borough	17	(2)
2012–2013	Salisbury City	21	(2)
2013–2014	Margate		
Total		146	(27)
- * Club domestic league appearances and goals

Charles Adesola Oludare Oluwatosi Ademeno (born 12 December 1988) is an English former professional footballer.

As a player he was a forward who played from 2005 to 2014. He played for Southend United, Bishop's Stortford, Cambridge United, Welling United, Rushden & Diamonds, Salisbury City, Crawley Town, Grimsby Town, AFC Wimbledon, Eastbourne Borough and Margate.

== Playing career ==
=== Southend United ===
Born in Milton Keynes, Buckinghamshire, Ademeno's second name "Adesola" means "crowned with wealth" in Yoruba. Ademeno was handed a professional contract at Southend United on 15 March 2007. He impressed in the Southend youth and reserve teams, and had successful loan spells at Bishop's Stortford and Cambridge United in the 2006–07 season.

Ademeno made his debut for Southend in the 4–1 win against Brentford on 14 March 2006. He came on in the 87th minute for Wayne Gray. His second first-team appearance came in the 3–1 defeat to Luton Town on 28 April 2007, when he came off the bench to replace Richie Foran. He spent much of the 2006–07 season on loan at Cambridge United.

On 9 November 2007 he signed a two-month loan deal at Welling United to try to return to fitness after a knee operation.

He then joined Rushden & Diamonds on loan until May 2008 on 21 February 2008. In November 2008 he was loaned out again, this time to Salisbury City in a swap deal for winger Liam Feeney.

=== Crawley Town ===
Following his release from Southend, Ademeno signed for Crawley Town on 26 May 2009. Ademeno starred in his first season at Crawley, scoring on eleven occasions in the league. Ademeno enjoyed a particularly memorable afternoon at Grays Athletic shortly after Christmas, notching a hat-trick within the first eight minutes of the game. The player attracted interest from numerous league clubs in the January transfer window, however no deal was finalised. Ademeno was out of contract as of the end of the 2009–10 season.

=== Grimsby Town ===
On 30 June 2010, Ademeno signed a two-year contract with Crawley's Conference National rivals Grimsby Town. Suffering an early injury setback in his first few months with Grimsby it wasn't until 3 January 2011 that Ademeno finally got off the mark with his new club, scoring twice in a 6–1 away win over Histon. Following an injury hit season, on 18 April 2011 despite having a year left on his contract, Ademeno was told he was free to leave the club and that he had no future at the club by Town's new managerial duo Rob Scott and Paul Hurst.

On 13 May, Town chairman John Fenty mentioned that the club should have done their homework before signing Ademeno for £10,000 the previous summer. He also mentioned that he thought former club Crawley had done a number on him following Ademeno's injury plagued season that saw him score two goals in seven starts.

On 4 June 2011 Ademeno was released by Town by mutual consent.

=== AFC Wimbledon ===
Ademeno signed with AFC Wimbledon on 27 June 2011. Ademeno scored his first goal for AFC Wimbledon after coming on as a substitute in a 3–2 opening day defeat to Bristol Rovers. However, with injury and poor form limiting him to only 6 starts for the Dons, Ademeno's contract was terminated in January 2012.

=== Eastbourne Borough and Salisbury City ===
Ademeno signed for Eastbourne Borough on 21 March 2012, reuniting him with former Salisbury City boss Tommy Widdrington. He was released in October, being deemed surplus to requirements.

On 6 November 2012, he joined fellow Conference South side Salisbury City on a free transfer with a view to a full-time contract.

=== Margate ===
He departed at the end of the season and joined Margate for their 2013–14 campaign.

== Personal life ==
In 2017 Ademeno joined Fulham as the club's Inclusion Officer, working with their academy and youth teams. He later worked for the Royal Borough of Chelsea and Kensington Council.
