= Seb Brown =

British footballer

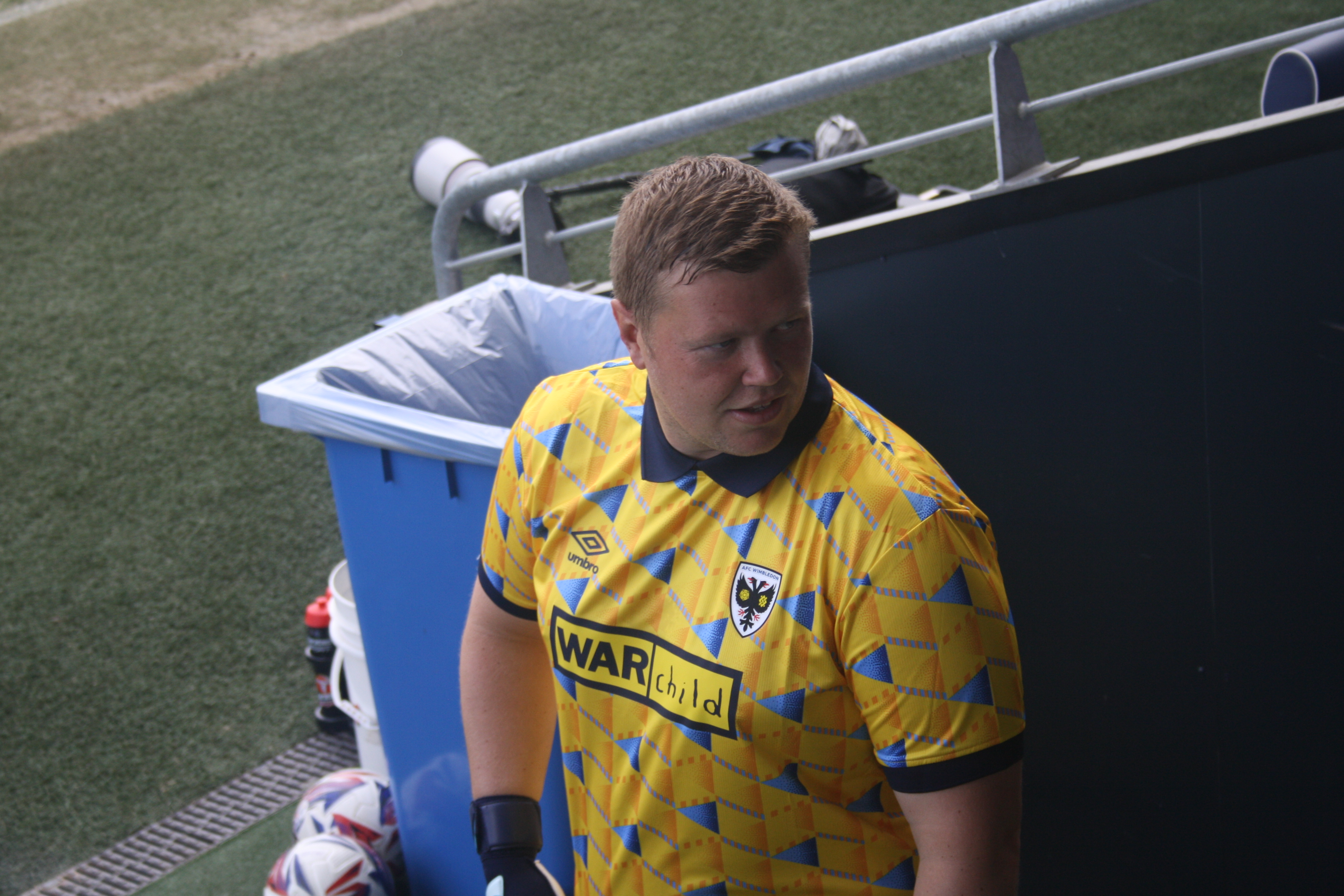
- Seb Brown in 2025.

Personal information
- Full name: Sebastian Alexander Brown
- Date of birth: 24 November 1989 (age 36)
- Place of birth: Sutton, England
- Height: 6 ft 0 in (1.83 m)
- Position: Goalkeeper

Team information
- Current team: Sutton United (goalkeeping coach)

Youth career
- –2007: Brentford

Senior career*
Years	Team	Apps	(Gls)
2007–2009	Brentford	0	(0)
2007	→ St Albans City (loan)	1	(0)
2007–2008	→ Windsor & Eton (loan)	25	(0)
2009–2014	AFC Wimbledon	125	(0)
2013	→ Woking (loan)	13	(0)
2014–2015	Bromley	23	(0)
2015	→ Whitehawk (loan)	1	(0)
2015	→ Hampton & Richmond Borough (loan)	8	(0)
2015–2016	Hampton & Richmond Borough	16	(0)
2016	Grays Athletic	0	(0)
2016–2017	Hampton & Richmond Borough	0	(0)
2016	→ Tonbridge Angels (loan)	1	(0)
2016	→ Metropolitan Police (loan)	3	(0)
2017–2021	Sutton United	0	(0)

International career
2010–2011	England C	3	(0)
- * Club domestic league appearances and goals

Sebastian Alexander Brown (born 24 November 1989) is an English professional footballer who plays as a goalkeeper for Sutton United.

== Club career ==
=== Early years ===
Brown came through the youth system of Brentford, moving up from the under–18s squad to the first-team for the 2006–07 season. On 22 August 2006, Brown had his first involvement with the first-team squad at as an unused substitute, at the age of just 16, in the 4–3 penalty shoot-out victory over Swindon Town, after the game had ended 2–2 in normal time, in the First Round of the 2006–07 League Cup. At the end of the 2007–08 season he signed his first professional contract with the League Two club. Brown was loaned to Southern League First Division South & West club Windsor & Eton to gain first team experience, making 25 appearances for the club. Brown made his competitive debut for Brentford on 2 September 2008 in the First Round of the 2008–09 Football League Trophy against Yeovil Town, which ended 2–2 and went to a penalty shoot-out. Despite being only 18 at the time, Brown saved a crucial penalty by Andre McCollin to allow "The Bees" to triumph 4–2. Despite this, however, Brown was released by manager Andy Scott on 6 May 2009 along with eight other players having failed to break into the first team.

=== AFC Wimbledon ===
Brown joined AFC Wimbledon in 2009. On 21 May 2011, he saved two penalties for the club in the 2010–11 Conference play-off final penalty shoot-out as they beat Luton Town to gain promotion to the Football League. He was named as the goalkeeper for the 2010–11 Conference Team of the Year. On 19 February 2013, it was announced that Brown had joined Conference club Woking on an initial one-month loan deal. Following his release, Brown signed for ambitious Conference South club Bromley. Following the club's signing of Alan Julian in January 2015, however, Brown joined Whitehawk on a month's loan. After making just one appearance for the Hawks, Brown returned to Bromley, and joined Hampton & Richmond Borough on loan.

== International career ==
Brown appeared twice for England C, playing in matches against Wales in 2010 and Belgium in 2011.

== Coaching career ==
In October 2016, Brown was announced as academy goalkeeping coach at AFC Wimbledon. He joined Sutton United as player-goalkeeping coach in 2017. In 2020 Brown announced that rather than returning to Plough Lane with the Dons, he would remain at Kingsmeadow and adopt a coaching role with the Chelsea Women's Academy teams.

== Personal life ==
Brown has a PFA Sports Science degree from Roehampton University.

Brown got married in 2014 to an American Costume Designer - Kristen Ernst-Brown.

== Career statistics ==
As of match played 14 March 2020

Appearances and goals by club, season and competition
Club	Season	League			FA Cup		League Cup		Other		Total	
Club	Season	Division	Apps	Goals	Apps	Goals	Apps	Goals	Apps	Goals	Apps	Goals
Brentford	2006–07	League One	0	0	0	0	0	0	0	0	0	0
Brentford	2007–08	League Two	0	0	0	0	0	0	0	0	0	0
Brentford	2008–09	League Two	0	0	0	0	0	0	1 (Note: Appearance in Football League Trophy)	0	1	0
Brentford	Total		0	0	0	0	0	0	1	0	1	0
St Albans City (loan)	2007–08	Conference South	1	0	―		―		―		1	0
Windsor & Eton (loan)	2007–08	Southern League First Division South & West	25	0	―		―		―		25	0
AFC Wimbledon	2009–10	Conference Premier	18	0	0	0	―		8 (Note: 3 appearances in FA Trophy, 3 appearances in London Senior Cup, 2 appearances in Surrey Senior Cup)	0	26	0
AFC Wimbledon	2010–11	Conference Premier	45	0	4	0	―		5 (Note: 3 appearances in Conference Premier play-offs, 2 appearances in FA Trophy)	0	54	0
AFC Wimbledon	2011–12	League Two	44	0	3	0	1	0	1	0	49	0
AFC Wimbledon	2012–13	League Two	17	0	2	0	1	0	0	0	19	0
AFC Wimbledon	2013–14	League Two	1	0	1	0	0	0	0	0	2	0
AFC Wimbledon	Total		125	0	10	0	2	0	14	0	151	0
Woking (loan)	2012–13	Conference Premier	13	0	―		―		―		13	0
Bromley	2014–15	Conference South	23	0	2	0	―		2 (Note: Appearances in FA Trophy)	0	27	0
Whitehawk (loan)	2014–15	Conference South	1	0	―		―		―		1	0
Hampton & Richmond Borough (loan)	2014–15	Isthmian League Premier Division	8	0	―		―		―		8	0
Hampton & Richmond Borough	2015–16	Isthmian League Premier Division	16	0	1	0	―		0	0	17	0
Hampton & Richmond Borough	2016–17	National League South	0	0	0	0	―		0	0	0	0
Hampton & Richmond Borough	Hampton & Richmond Borough total		24	0	1	0	―		0	0	25	0
Tonbridge Angels (loan)	2016–17	Isthmian League Premier Division	1	0	―		―		―		1	0
Metropolitan Police (loan)	2016–17	Isthmian League Premier Division	3	0	―		―		―		3	0
Sutton United	2016–17	National League	0	0	―		―		―		0	0
Sutton United	2017–18	National League	0	0	0	0	―		0	0	0	0
Sutton United	2018–19	National League	0	0	0	0	―		0	0	0	0
Sutton United	2019–20	National League	0	0	0	0	―		0	0	0	0
Sutton United	2020–21	National League	0	0	0	0	―		0	0	0	0
Sutton United	Total		0	0	0	0	―		0	0	0	0
Career total			216	0	13	0	2	0	17	0	248	0

== Honours ==
AFC Wimbledon

- Conference Premier play-offs: 2011

Bromley

- Conference South: 2014–15

Hampton & Richmond Borough

- Isthmian League Premier Division: 2015–16

Individual

- Conference Premier Team of the Year: 2010–11
