= Sam Hatton =

English footballer (born 1988)

Personal information
- Full name: Samuel William Hatton
- Date of birth: 7 February 1988 (age 38)
- Place of birth: St Albans, England
- Height: 5 ft 11 in (1.80 m)
- Positions: Defender; midfielder

Team information
- Current team: Welwyn Garden City

Youth career
- 2003–2005: Stevenage Borough

Senior career*
| Years | Team | Apps | (Gls) |
| 2005–2007 | Stevenage Borough | 1 | (0) |
| 2006 | → Northwood (loan) | 5 | (1) |
| 2006 | → Yeading (loan) | 6 | (1) |
| 2006 | → Maidenhead United (loan) | 3 | (0) |
| 2006 | → Diss Town (loan) | ? | (?) |
| 2007 | → Yeading (loan) | 1 | (0) |
| 2007–2012 | AFC Wimbledon | 197 | (22) |
| 2012–2014 | Grimsby Town | 57 | (3) |
| 2014–2016 | Aldershot Town | 29 | (5) |
| 2016–2017 | Welling United | 23 | (0) |
| 2017 | Hemel Hempstead Town | 6 | (0) |
| 2017–2018 | Bishop's Stortford | 9 | (0) |
| 2018 | Staines Town | 0 | (0) |
| 2018 | Wealdstone | 0 | (0) |
| 2018 | Dartford | 3 | (0) |
| 2018–2021 | Enfield Town | 56 | (1) |
| 2021–2022 | Wingate & Finchley | 36 | (5) |
| 2022– | Welwyn Garden City | 0 | (0) |

International career
| 2010– | England C | 3 | (0) |
- * Club domestic league appearances and goals as of 15:03, 20 December 2022 (UTC)

Samuel William Hatton (born 7 February 1988) is an English professional footballer who plays for Welwyn Garden City.

Having started his career with Stevenage Borough, he spent time on loan with Northwood, Yeading, Maidenhead United and Diss Town before moving to AFC Wimbledon in 2007 where he notched up 197 league appearances and 22 goals, also helping them earn promotion to the Football League in 2011. He joined Grimsby Town in 2012 where he remained for two seasons. His time with The Dons and Grimsby represent his only spells spent as a professional footballer before later moving on to play for Aldershot Town, Welling United, Hemel Hempstead Town, Bishop's Stortford, Staines Town, Wealdstone and Dartford.

== Early life ==
Samuel William Hatton was born 7 February 1988 in St Albans, Hertfordshire.

== Club career ==
=== Stevenage Borough ===
Hatton progressed through the ranks of the Stevenage Borough academy but only made one first team appearance for the Conference National side. His time at Stevenage was frustrating, as he was loaned out a total of five times between 2006 and 2007.

=== AFC Wimbledon ===
In the 2007–8 pre-season, Hatton was signed by AFC Wimbledon. He performed consistently over the course of five seasons, at first in midfield before converting to right back and was a part of three promotions, including the historic season that saw the club's promotion to the Football League. He was the club's longest serving player, having made 197 league appearances up to the end of the 2011–12 season.

In May 2011, he was voted by the Wimbledon Independent Supporters Association as player of the 2010–11 season.

On 15 May 2012, Hatton was released by AFC Wimbledon. Manager Terry Brown announced through the AFC Wimbledon website that the club would not take up an option to extend Hatton's contract for the 2012–13 season. Brown described this as: "Definitely one of the hardest decisions I have had to make as a manager."

=== Grimsby Town ===
On 23 June 2012, Hatton signed a two-year contract with Conference Premier side Grimsby Town. He was primarily used as Grimsby's first choice right back for both the 2012–13 and 2013–14 seasons. Both seasons ended with the club being defeated in the Conference Play-off semi finals. He was amongst a number of players released on 9 May 2014.

=== Aldershot Town ===
After being released by Grimsby Town, Hatton signed for fellow Conference Premier club Aldershot Town in July 2014.

=== Non-League ===
Hatton has since played for Welling United, Hemel Hempstead Town, Bishop's Stortford, Staines Town, Wealdstone and Dartford.

In December 2022, Hatton joined Welwyn Garden City, again following manager Marc Weatherstone whom Hatton had played under at Enfield Town and Wingate & Finchley.

== International career ==
During his time with AFC Wimbledon in the Conference Premier, Hatton appeared twice for England C, playing in matches against the Republic of Ireland U23 in 2010 and Belgium U23 in 2011. Hatton was called up to the England C team again in 2012.

Having featured in two out of five of Grimsby's games, Hatton was named in the England C squad to face Belgium in Brussels on Wednesday 12 September in an International Challenge Trophy game.

== Honours ==
AFC Wimbledon

- Conference Premier play-offs: 2010–11
