= Reece Jones (footballer) =

English footballer

Personal information
- Full name: Reece Nicholas Jones
- Date of birth: 22 July 1992 (age 34)
- Place of birth: London Borough of Kingston upon Thames, England
- Height: 1.85 m (6 ft 1 in)
- Position: Midfielder

Team information
- Current team: Chessington Galaxy

Youth career
- 2001–2003: Wimbledon
- 2003–2010: Fulham

Senior career*
Years	Team	Apps	(Gls)
2010–2012	AFC Wimbledon	4	(0)
2010	→ Lewes (loan)	3	(0)
2011	→ Kingstonian (loan)	2	(0)
2012	→ Carshalton Athletic (loan)	5	(0)
2012	→ Hampton & Richmond Borough (loan)	13	(3)
2012	Sutton United	4	(0)
2012–2014	Farnborough	35	(0)
2015–	Chessington Galaxy	1	(1)

International career^{‡}
2008–2010	Wales U17		
2010–2011	Wales U19	14	(1)
2011	Wales U21	1	(0)
- * Club domestic league appearances and goals as of 16:19, 16 January 2015 (UTC) ‡ National team caps and goals as of 10:42, 28 January 2012 (UTC)

Reece Jones (born 22 July 1992) is a former Wales under-21 international footballer who plays as a midfielder.

== Career ==
Born in London Borough of Kingston upon Thames, Jones began his career at the Wimbledon youth academy in 2003 before the club's relocation. He was then signed by the Fulham youth academy and was captain of the u-16 side, before being released in early 2010.

On 3 August 2010, Jones signed for AFC Wimbledon, the reformation of his former youth club.

On 13 January 2012, reece signed for Isthmian League Premier Division side Carshalton Athletic on an initial one-month loan.

Jones then went out on another loan this time to Conference South side Hampton & Richmond Borough initially for one month from 24 February 2012, however, this was later extended on 22 March until the end of the season.

In May 2012, Jones was released by AFC Wimbledon. After a successful trial at Sutton United in the summer of 2012, Jones signed for the club

In August 2013, it was announced Reece would be one of the Farnborough team changing his name to a famous ex-footballer, in line with a sponsorship agreement with bookmakers Paddy Power. It was announced Reece would be known under his new name, George Best.

In September 2015, Reece made his competitive debut for Chessington Galaxy, getting on the scoresheet in the process.

== International ==
Jones last represented Wales at the under-21s level and has also appeared for the under-19s and 17s.
