= Jack Turner (footballer, born 1992) =

English footballer

Personal information
- Full name: Jack Anthony Turner
- Date of birth: 17 September 1992 (age 34)
- Place of birth: Ashford, England
- Height: 1.88 m (6 ft 2 in)
- Position: Goalkeeper

Team information
- Current team: Sholing
- Number: 1

Youth career
- 1999–2007: Staines Town
- 2007–2008: AFC Wimbledon

Senior career*
Years	Team	Apps	(Gls)
2008–2012	AFC Wimbledon	4	(0)
2012–2017	Staines Town	197	(1)
2017–2021	Slough Town	133	(0)
2021	Cray Wanderers	17	(0)
2021–2026	Farnborough	187	(0)
2026	→ Sholing (loan)	11	(0)
2026–	Sholing	6	(0)
- * Club domestic league appearances and goals as of 21:09, 3 September 2026 (UTC)

Jack Anthony Turner (born 17 September 1992) is an English semi-professional footballer who plays as a goalkeeper for Southern League Premier Division South club Sholing.

== Career ==
Turner started his career in the youth team of Staines Town, but left in 2007 to sign for AFC Wimbledon. He made his senior debut for the Dons in the London Senior Cup on 7 October 2008, in a 0–3 defeat to Erith Town, conceding a hat-trick in four minutes. He signed his first professional contract in the summer of 2009, after rejecting offers to trial with clubs from the Football League. He made his league debut for AFC Wimbledon on 20 April 2010, in the Conference game against Tamworth, in a 0–1 defeat at Kingsmeadow. His next appearance in the league came over a year later in the 2010–11 season on 22 April 2011, in a 2–1 victory over Mansfield Town. He was an unused substitute in the 2011 Conference Play-off final win over Luton Town, which saw the Dons gain a place in the Football League. Turner made his professional debut on 4 October 2011, in a 2–2 draw with Stevenage in the Football League Trophy second round. After being released on a free transfer by AFC Wimbledon at the end of the 2011–12 season, Turner re-joined Staines Town.

On 27 May 2017, Turner agreed to join Southern League side Slough Town, following a five-year spell back with his boyhood club, Staines Town. Achieving promotion to the National League South during the 2017–18 campaign, he went onto feature over 150 times for the Berkshire-based side, before leaving the club at the end of the 2020–21 season.

Following a brief spell with Cray Wanderers, Turner joined Farnborough in December 2021. In his first season with the club, Turner played 25 times during their successful play-off campaign, helping secure promotion to the National League South and ending Farnborough's seven-year spell away from the division. Following over 150 appearances for the club, Turner agreed a new two-year deal in February 2025, signing on until June 2027. On 4 March 2026, Turner joined Southern League Premier Division South side, Sholing on loan for the remainder of the 2025–26 season.

On 23 June 2026, Turner agreed to return to Sholing on a permanent basis, agreeing a two-year deal for an undisclosed fee.

== Career statistics ==
As of match played 31 August 2026

Appearances and goals by club, season and competition
Club	Season	League			FA Cup		EFL Cup		Other		Total	
Club	Season	Division	Apps	Goals	Apps	Goals	Apps	Goals	Apps	Goals	Apps	Goals
AFC Wimbledon	2009–10	Conference Premier	1	0	0	0	—		0	0	1	0
AFC Wimbledon	2010–11	Conference Premier	1	0	0	0	—		0	0	1	0
AFC Wimbledon	2011–12	League Two	2	0	0	0	0	0	1 (Note: Appearance in the Football League Trophy)	0	3	0
AFC Wimbledon	Total		4	0	0	0	0	0	1	0	5	0
Staines Town	2012–13	Conference South	41	0	1	0	—		2 (Note: Appearances in the FA Trophy)	0	44	0
Staines Town	2013–14	Conference South	30	0	0	0	—		4	0	34	0
Staines Town	2014–15	Conference South	40	1	3	0	—		2	0	45	1
Staines Town	2015–16	Isthmian League Premier Division	43	0	5	0	—		1	0	49	0
Staines Town	2016–17	Isthmian League Premier Division	43	0	3	0	—		2 (Note: One appearance in the Alan Turvey Trophy, one in the FA Trophy)	0	48	0
Staines Town	Total		197	1	12	0	—		11	0	220	1
Slough Town	2017–18	Southern League Premier Division	44	0	6	0	—		8 (Note: Two appearances in the Southern League Cup, four in the FA Trophy, two in the Southern League Premier Division play-offs)	0	58	0
Slough Town	2018–19	National League South	42	0	8	0	—		1	0	51	0
Slough Town	2019–20	National League South	35	0	3	0	—		3 (Note: Two appearances in the FA Trophy, one in the National League South play-offs)	0	41	0
Slough Town	2020–21	National League South	12	0	2	0	—		1	0	15	0
Slough Town	Total		133	0	19	0	—		13	0	165	0
Cray Wanderers	2021–22	Isthmian League Premier Division	17	0	1	0	—		3	0	21	0
Farnborough	2021–22	Southern League Premier Division South	23	0	—		—		2 (Note: Appearances in the Southern League Premier Division South play-offs)	0	25	0
Farnborough	2022–23	National League South	46	0	6	0	—		2	0	54	0
Farnborough	2023–24	National League South	46	0	3	0	—		1	0	50	0
Farnborough	2024–25	National League South	46	0	1	0	—		1	0	48	0
Farnborough	2025–26	National League South	26	0	3	0	—		1	0	30	0
Farnborough	Total		187	0	13	0	—		7	0	207	0
Sholing (loan)	2025–26	Southern League Premier Division South	11	0	—		—		—		11	0
Sholing	2026–27	Southern League Premier Division South	6	0	0	0	—		0	0	6	0
Career total			555	1	45	0	0	0	35	0	635	1

== Honours ==
Slough Town

- Southern League Premier Division play-offs: 2018

Farnborough

- Southern League Premier Division South play-offs: 2022
