= Lee Minshull =

English footballer

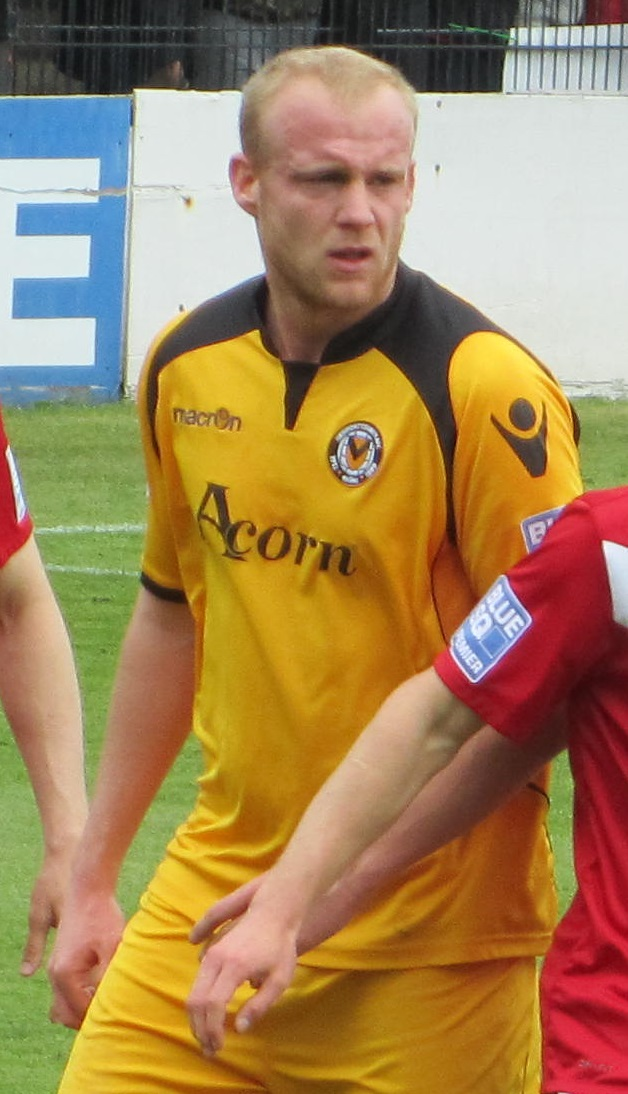
- Minshull playing for Newport County in 2012

Personal information
- Full name: Lee Benjamin Minshull
- Date of birth: 11 November 1985 (age 40)
- Place of birth: Chatham, England
- Position: Midfielder

Senior career*
Years	Team	Apps	(Gls)
2002–2004	Sittingbourne		
2004–2009	Ramsgate	92	(11)
2005	→ Deal Town (loan)	8	(1)
2009–2010	Tonbridge Angels	40	(17)
2010–2012	AFC Wimbledon	20	(2)
2012	→ Newport County (loan)	17	(1)
2012–2015	Newport County	116	(13)
2015–2017	Bromley	60	(3)
2017–2018	Leatherhead	37	(3)
2018–2020	Concord Rangers	40	(2)
Total		430	(52)
- * Club domestic league appearances and goals

Lee Benjamin Minshull (born 11 November 1985) is an English former professional footballer who played as a midfielder.

== Career ==
Born in Chatham, Kent, Minshull played for Charlton Athletic School of Excellence as a youngster. He began his senior career with Ramsgate before moving to Tonbridge Angels in 2009. He played 40 times in the 2009–10 season; scoring 17 goals, making him the club's second top scorer for that season. In 2010, he left Tonbridge to join Conference Premier side AFC Wimbledon. He made his Football League debut for Wimbledon on 6 August 2011, in a 3–2 defeat to Bristol Rovers.

In January 2012, Minshull joined Newport County on loan. On 12 May 2012, he played for Newport in the FA Trophy Final at Wembley Stadium which Newport lost 2–0 to York City. In May 2012 Minshull was released by Wimbledon at the end of his contract and subsequently joined Newport County on a permanent contract. In the 2012–13 season he was part of the Newport team that finished 3rd in the league, reaching the Conference Premier play-offs. Newport County won the playoff final versus Wrexham at Wembley Stadium 2–0 to return to the Football League after a 25-year absence with promotion to Football League Two.

Minshull was released by Newport in May 2015 at the end of his contract. On 27 May 2015, he joined National League club Bromley. Following two seasons at the club, in which he became a fans' favourite, Minshull left Bromley to pursue a part-time career in football.

On 16 May 2018, following a spell at Leatherhead, Minshull joined Concord Rangers on a one-year deal.

In June 2020, Minshull announced his retirement from football, continuing on with Concord Rangers in the role of assistant manager.

== Personal life ==
Minshull worked as a quantity surveyor prior to move into full-time football with AFC Wimbledon, returning to this career after his retirement from football.

== Career statistics ==
As of 6 August 2011.

Club	Season	League		FA Cup		League Cup		Other		Total	
Club	Season	Apps	Goals	Apps	Goals	Apps	Goals	Apps	Goals	Apps	Goals
Ramsgate	2005–06	6	1	?	?	?	?	?	?	6	1
Ramsgate	2006–07	30	5	?	?	?	?	?	?	30	5
Ramsgate	2007–08	37	3	?	?	?	?	?	?	37	3
Ramsgate	2008–09	16	2	?	?	?	?	?	?	16	2
Tonbridge Angels	2009–10	40	17	0	0	0	0	0	0	40	17
AFC Wimbledon	2010–11	19	2	2	1	0	0	1	0	22	3
AFC Wimbledon	2011–12	1	0	0	0	0	0	0	0	1	0
AFC Wimbledon	Total	20	2	2	1	0	0	1	0	23	3
Career totals		60	19	2	1	0	0	1	0	63	20

== Personal life ==
Minshull is in a relationship with Kelcie, the daughter of international referee Ian John-Lewis. Minshull put his full-time career as a quantity surveyor on hold to play full-time football for AFC Wimbledon after their promotion to the Football League in 2011.
