= Gareth Gwillim =

English footballer (born 1983)

Personal information
- Full name: Gareth Stuart Gwillim
- Date of birth: 9 January 1983 (age 43)
- Place of birth: Farnborough, London, England
- Position: Left back

Youth career
- Welling United
- Crystal Palace

Senior career*
Years	Team	Apps	(Gls)
2002–2003	Farnborough Town	1	(0)
2002	Ashford Town (Kent)	3	(0)
2003–2007	Bishop's Stortford	158	(2)
2007–2010	Histon	123	(6)
2010–2011	Dagenham & Redbridge	2	(0)
2011	→ AFC Wimbledon (loan)	20	(0)
2011–2012	AFC Wimbledon	27	(1)
2012–2013	Sutton United	19	(1)
2013–2014	Ebbsfleet United	14	(0)
Total		367	(10)
- * Club domestic league appearances and goals

Gareth Stuart Gwillim (born 9 January 1983) is an English former professional footballer who played as a left back.

== Career ==
Born in Farnborough, London, Gwillim began his career as a junior at Welling United and Crystal Palace, before moving into non-League football, playing for such teams as Farnborough Town, Ashford Town (Kent), Bishop's Stortford and Histon.

After Histon rejected a formal approach from Dagenham & Redbridge in November 2009, Gwillim eventually signed for Dagenham & Redbridge in June 2010 on a two-year deal. Gwillim made his professional debut on 31 August 2010, in a 0–1 defeat in the Football League Trophy against Charlton Athletic. After the match, Gwillim publicly announced his plans to usurp Damien McCrory as the club's first-choice left back. Gwillim made his debut in the Football League on 21 September 2010.

On 13 January 2011, Gwillim agreed a loan deal with AFC Wimbledon, playing with them in the 2011 Conference play-off final. Gwillim signed permanently for the club in July 2011. He then returned to non-league football with Sutton United and Ebbsfleet United.
