= James Mulley =

English footballer

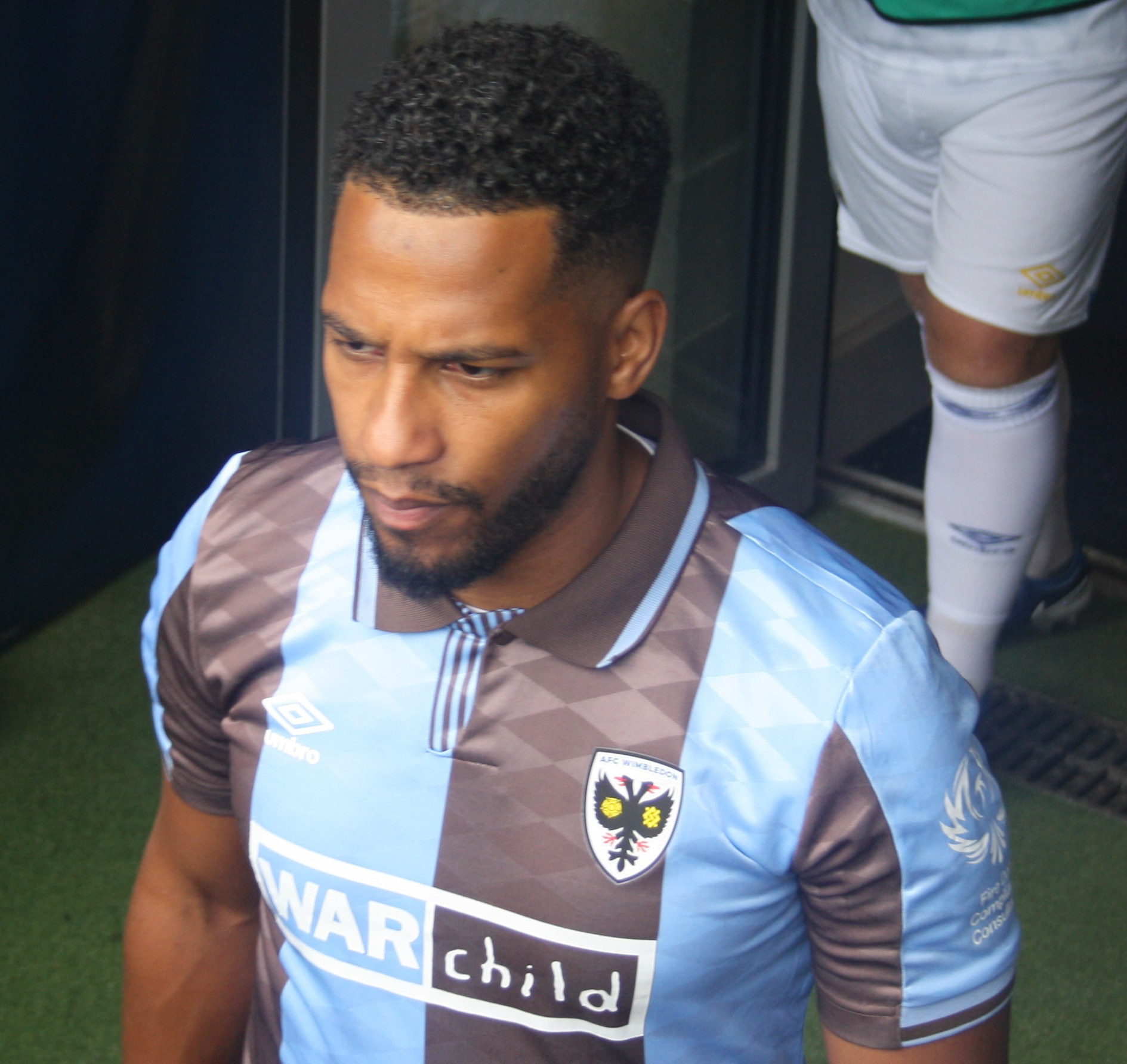
- Mulley in 2025.

Personal information
- Full name: James Anthony Mulley
- Date of birth: 30 September 1988 (age 38)
- Place of birth: Edgware, England
- Height: 5 ft 8 in (1.73 m)
- Positions: Central midfielder; winger

Team information
- Current team: Penn & Tylers Green

Senior career*
| Years | Team | Apps | (Gls) |
| 2006–2007 | Yeading | 16 | (0) |
| 2007 | → Slough Town (loan) | 2 | (0) |
| 2007–2010 | Hayes & Yeading United | 133 | (10) |
| 2010–2011 | Chelmsford City | 2 | (0) |
| 2011–2012 | AFC Wimbledon | 32 | (5) |
| 2012 | → Hayes & Yeading United (loan) | 1 | (0) |
| 2012 | → Wealdstone (loan) | 7 | (0) |
| 2012–2015 | Braintree Town | 113 | (9) |
| 2015–2018 | Maidenhead United | 91 | (9) |
| 2018 | → Wingate & Finchley (loan) | 3 | (0) |
| 2018 | Hampton & Richmond Borough | 10 | (0) |
| 2018 | Maidenhead United | 13 | (0) |
| 2019 | Enfield Town | 6 | (0) |
| 2019 | Bracknell Town | 6 | (0) |
| 2019 | Enfield Town | 0 | (0) |
| 2019–2021 | Uxbridge | 16 | (0) |
| 2021–2022 | Ware | 27 | (0) |
| 2022 | Kings Langley | 11 | (0) |
| 2022–2024 | Welwyn Garden City | 36 | (0) |
| 2024 | Arlesey Town | 7 | (0) |
| 2024–2025 | Flackwell Heath | 9 | (0) |
| 2025– | Penn & Tylers Green | 17 | (0) |
- * Club domestic league appearances and goals as of 21:15, 12 August 2024 (UTC)

James Anthony Mulley (born 30 September 1988) is an English semi-professional footballer who plays as a central midfielder or winger for Penn & Tylers Green.

== Career ==
Born in London, Mulley began his career with Yeading and successor club Hayes & Yeading United, and was their longest-serving player when he left the club in October 2010. He also spent time on loan at Slough Town. After a spell with Chelmsford City, he signed for AFC Wimbledon in January 2011, initially on non-contract terms. He returned to Hayes & Yeading United on loan in January 2012, and he also had a loan spell at Wealdstone in March 2012. In May 2012 Mulley was released by AFC Wimbledon, having been free to leave the club since January of that year. He later signed for Braintree Town. He moved to Maidenhead United in June 2015. He joined Wingate & Finchley on loan on 2 February 2018. Later that month he joined Hampton & Richmond Borough permanently. In July 2018 he re-joined Maidenhead, making a further 14 appearances before leaving in November. Mulley then joined Enfield Town in February 2019 before joining Bracknell Town in June. Mulley re-joined Enfield Town in November, but played only one game before joining Uxbridge later that month. Mulley joined Ware for the 2021-22 season. He joined Kings Langley in August 2022, before joining Welwyn Garden City in December.
