= Terry Brown (football manager) =

English footballer and manager (born 1952)

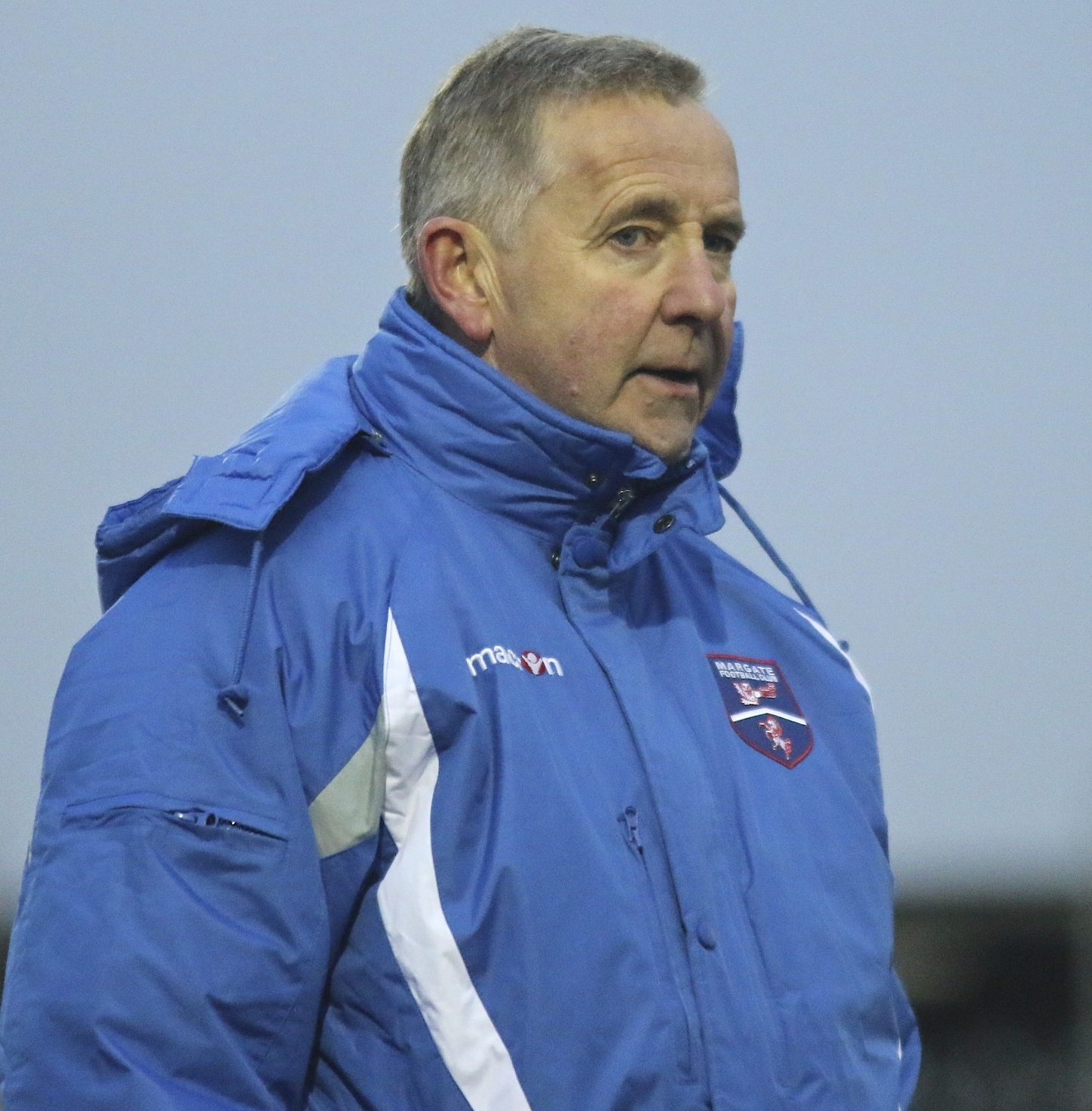
- Brown while Margate manager in 2015

Personal information
- Date of birth: 5 August 1952 (age 74)
- Place of birth: Hillingdon, England

Senior career*
Years	Team	Apps	(Gls)
1971–1973	Hayes		
1973–1974	Slough Town	22	(2)
1974	Sutton United	3	(1)
1974–1977	Slough Town	94	(31)
1977–1979	Hayes		
1979–????	Wokingham Town		

Managerial career
- 1993–2002: Hayes
- 2002–2007: Aldershot Town
- 2007–2012: AFC Wimbledon
- 2013–2015: Margate
- 2016–2018: Basingstoke Town
- 2018: Basingstoke Town
- * Club domestic league appearances and goals

Terry Brown (born 5 August 1952) is an English football manager and former player. He is a former chairman of Basingstoke Town and has managed Margate, AFC Wimbledon, Aldershot Town, Hayes and Basingstoke Town. He is currently head of football operations of his former club Aldershot Town.

== Playing career ==
Born in Hillingdon, London, Brown joined Hayes from local football as a 19-year-old and made his debut against Enfield Town in April 1971. He became a regular during the next season and was part of the team which first defeated Football League opposition in Bristol Rovers. He caught the attention of scouts from Fulham and Millwall, and was selected for the FA Amateur XI. Either side of a short spell with Sutton United in 1974, Brown played for Slough Town from 1973 to 1977, before rejoining Hayes, where he stayed until October 1979. In both spells with Hayes he made a total of 148 appearances and scored 45 goals. Brown left for Wokingham Town, where he played well into the 1980s.

Before becoming a manager he coached Wokingham Town, for whom he had also played.

== Managerial career ==
=== Hayes ===
Brown was in charge of Hayes for nine years between 1993 and 2002. He managed to take the Middlesex side from the brink of relegation from the Isthmian League Premier Division to third in the Football Conference, just six points behind champions Cheltenham Town. But with a diminishing budget and his best players sold to make ends meet, Brown saw his side slip into a relegation dogfight. Frustrated, he applied for the Aldershot Town job and was selected for the job ahead of 50 other candidates.

=== Aldershot Town ===
Terry Brown was appointed as Aldershot manager on 25 March 2002, the 10th anniversary of the town's old club Aldershot being wound up in the High Court.

After winning the Hampshire Senior Cup in his first month in charge, he began to assemble what he hoped would be a squad capable of achieving promotion in his first full season in charge. The team won the league by a clear 13 points from nearest rivals Canvey Island.

Brown and his part-time players had an impressive first Conference National season by qualifying for the end-of-season play-offs. Aldershot beat favourites Hereford United on penalties before finally succumbing to Shrewsbury Town in the final.

The following season, now armed with a full-time squad, Brown equalled the achievements of the previous season by again qualifying for the play-offs. However, his team went down to another penalty-shoot-out defeat, this time to Carlisle United, despite leading 3–1 at one point in spot kicks.

After two consecutive play-off losses, the eventual 13th-place finish in the 2005–06 season was seen as an underachievement by all and forced Brown to almost completely restructure his entire squad in the summer of 2006.

Brown resigned one day before his fifth anniversary with the club to take care of his wife Susan who had leukaemia. His final match was a 1–0 win against Weymouth on 27 March 2007.

=== AFC Wimbledon ===
On 15 May 2007, Brown was announced as the new manager of AFC Wimbledon, following the resignation of Dave Anderson after the Dons' second successive play-off semi-final defeat in the Isthmian League. He was joined at Wimbledon by Stuart Cash, who had been his assistant at Aldershot, and who joined the Dons directly from Lewes, where he was assistant to Steve King. In his first season, they were promoted to the Conference South after a 2–1 play-off final win against Staines Town.

In the summer of 2008, Brown released eight of the promotion-winning side. He said he wanted to build a more youthful side that could compete for promotion out of the Conference South. He led the team to the Conference South title, resulting in promotion to the Conference National.

During the close season of 2009 The Terry Brown Story was produced by Cherry Red Records TV, documenting both Brown's playing and managerial career in the form of a candid interview with the man himself.

In their first season in the Conference National, Wimbledon finished 8th. In the close season Brown rebuilt his squad with a younger fresher look to it, as the club had decided to go full-time for the first time in its eight-year history.

On 21 May 2011, Brown led AFC Wimbledon to the Football League for the first time in the club's history, beating Luton Town 4–3 on penalties after a 0–0 draw in the Conference play-off final. Brown led them to safety in their first year in the Football League.

Brown was sacked as manager of AFC Wimbledon on 19 September 2012 following a home defeat to Torquay United.

=== Margate ===
On 12 December 2013, Brown was appointed manager of Isthmian League club Margate. He was sacked on 7 December 2015.

=== Basingstoke ===
On 22 March 2016, Brown was appointed manager of Basingstoke Town. At the end of the 2017–18 season he became Director of Football at the club. However, after his replacement as manager left in November 2018, he returned to the position of manager until Martin Kuhl was appointed in December.

On 21 November 2018, Brown was voted as chairman of the Basingstoke Town Community Football Club alongside Steve Williams, Colin Phillimore, Denise Williams, Martin French, Katy Oliver and Sarah Parsons.

=== Return to Aldershot Town ===
On 20 September 2021, Brown returned to Aldershot Town in the role of first-team coach to newly appointed manager Mark Molesley whom Brown had previously managed for Aldershot. On 15 October 2022, following the sacking of Molesley, Brown was to assist interim manager Ross McNeilly.
