= 2012–13 Newport County A.F.C. season =

Welsh association football club season

Newport County
2012–13 season
- Chairman: Chris Blight (until 19 July 2012); Les Scadding (from 23 August 2012)
- Manager: Justin Edinburgh
- Stadium: Rodney Parade
- Conference National: 3rd (promoted via play-offs)
- FA Cup: Fourth qualifying round
- FA Trophy: First round
- Top goalscorer: League: Aaron O'Connor (19); All: Aaron O'Connor (21)
- Highest home attendance: 6,615 vs Grimsby Town (28 April 2013)
- Lowest home attendance: 1,479 vs Gateshead (1 December 2012)
- Average home league attendance: 2,547
Home colours	Away colours

The 2012–13 season was Newport County's third consecutive season in the Conference National and 92nd season of league football overall. The season marked the return of association football to Rodney Parade for the first time in 72 years. The club celebrated its centenary in the 2012–13 season by winning promotion to Football League Two after a 25-year absence.

== Season review ==
=== Introduction ===
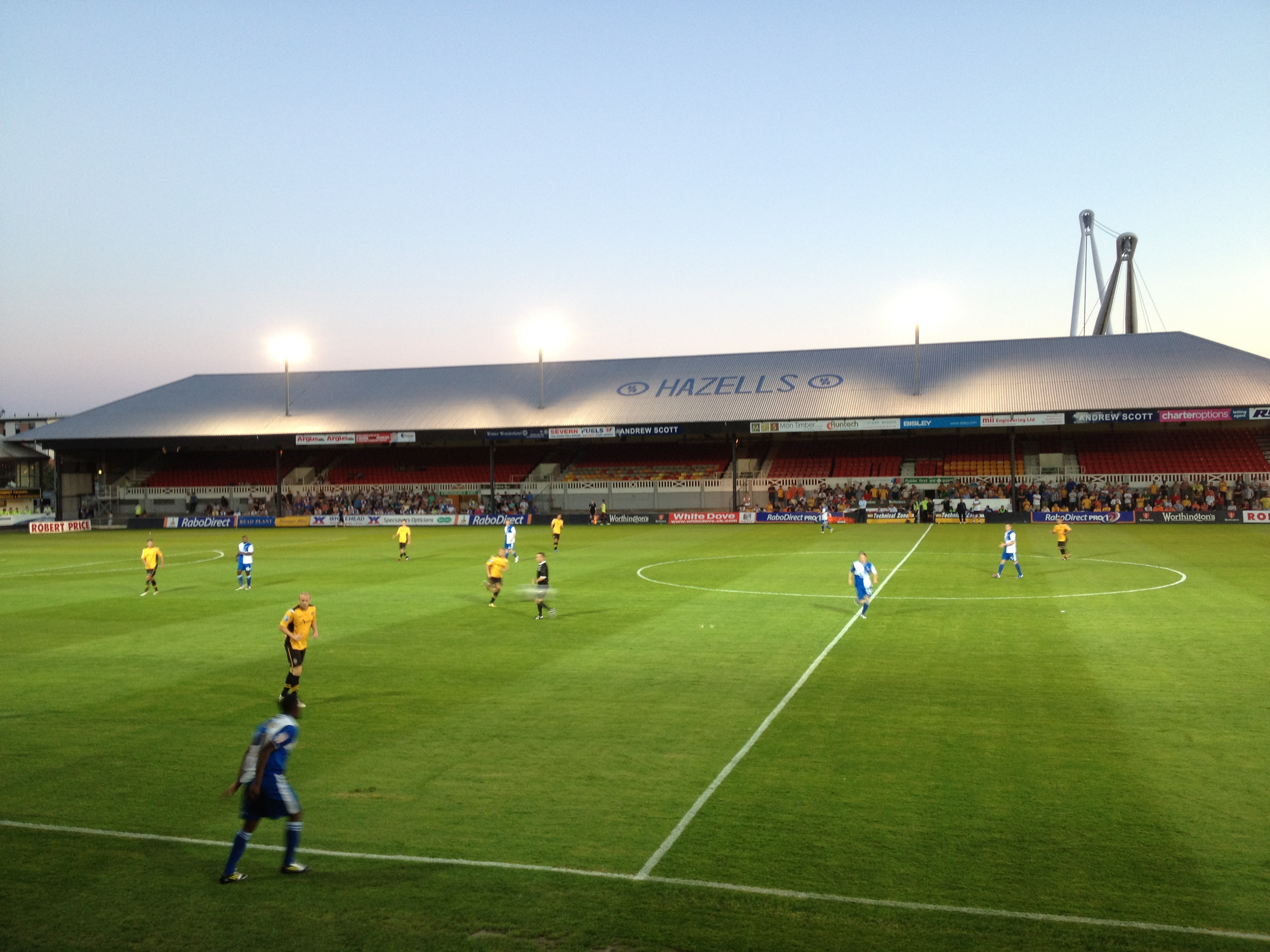
Rodney Parade

In May 2012, Newport County announced that they had agreed a deal to move to the city's rugby stadium, Rodney Parade. In August 2012 EuroMillions lottery winner Les Scadding succeeded Chris Blight as club Chairman. In February 2013 a further 10-year lease to play at Rodney Parade was signed.

The centenary 2012–13 season saw Newport County finish third in the Conference Premier league, reaching the play-offs for the first time. A 2–0 aggregate win over Grimsby Town in the two-legged play-off semi-final saw Newport County reach the 2013 Conference Premier play-off final at Wembley Stadium. The final versus Wrexham was the first Wembley final to feature two Welsh teams, and Newport County won 2–0 to return to the Football League after a 25-year absence with promotion to League Two. County were awarded Freedom of the City of Newport on 17 August 2013 in recognition of this achievement.

=== League ===
==== 2012 ====
The season started away to promotion hopefuls Mansfield Town. County were 2–0 up within 13 minutes, but found themselves level at 2–2 five minutes into the second half. Eventually winning 4–3 County were 3rd in the table. After a 4–0 home win to Nuneaton Town County were top of the table and stayed there during a run of five consecutive wins culminating in a 2–0 home victory to local rivals Hereford United — their first visit to Newport since the Welsh Cup clash in 1989. County were now the only team in the division with a 100% record. However, following defeats to 10th-placed Wrexham and 12th-placed Dartford County were back in 3rd place, but the next three games were won and County were back to the top. Following a 0–0 draw with Grimsby Town County were temporarily down to 2nd, but were back at the top after the next six games. Following a shock home defeat to second-bottom Hyde County were down to 2nd on goal difference, but back on top the following game after a 3–1 home win against Gateshead. Despite leading Kidderminster Harriers 2–1 in the next game County lost 3–2 and they were back to 3rd. The home match with Luton Town was won 5–2, taking County back to the top of the table. The last game of 2012 was won away at Forest Green Rovers, but with Grimsby Town having played an extra game County finished the year in 2nd place.

==== 2013 ====
The first fixture of the new year was the home visit of Forest Green Rovers. County were decisively beaten 5–0 and dropped to 3rd in the table as a result. The next match at home to Wrexham ended in a 1–1 draw, which was enough to put Wrexham top of the table, with County staying 3rd, one point behind. County rose to 2nd in the table following the 4–2 away win at Lincoln City, with débutant Robbie Willmott scoring a brace. With momentum in their favour County were desperate to get the home match with bottom-placed Barrow on, but the Rodney Parade pitch was under several feet of snow on the morning of 19 January. Over 120 fans helped to clear the pitch but County went on to lose 2–0. Following that setback, Newport then went on a seven-match unbeaten run, including completing the double over Mansfield Town and Hereford United in the process. The Hereford match being particularly notable for the award of three penalties to Hereford, two of which were scored. In the following match a 90th-minute winner for Kidderminster Harriers resulted in them being the only team to complete double victories over County and move into top place in the table as a result. The next game resulted in a second consecutive County defeat away at Stockport County — Stockport winning 1–0 as a result of a Lee Minshull own goal. County now faced the prospect of the remaining 10 matches in just 26 days. However they went on another unbeaten run, winning at Southport three days later, followed by a 0–0 away draw with Gateshead two days after that. The Gateshead match was played at Boston United's York Street ground with the match having been postponed on four previous occasions. A further 0–0 draw was played out with Dartford just two days later. Newport got back to winning ways with their second victory over Nuneaton Town two days after that. Following a 0–0 away draw with Cambridge United a place in the play-offs was secured with a 1–0 home victory over Braintree Town which also represented the seventh double of the season. Newport finished their home season with victories over Macclesfield Town and Alfreton Town, the latter of which was played in torrential rain with large pools of standing water. The penultimate game of the season was a 2–2 away draw with Luton Town with the final game against fellow play-off contenders Grimsby Town. County manager Justin Edinburgh fielded a much-changed side, resting many first-team players ahead of the play-off matches. As a result, County lost 3–0 and set up a semi-final first leg back at Blundell Park four days later.

==== Play-offs ====
The County team that lined up against Grimsby in the semi-final first leg contained seven changes from the team that had played in the last league game. Grimsby, who boasted the best defensive record in the division, made only three changes. In a vastly different affair to the league game, County triumphed 1–0 as a result of an Ismail Yakubu header in the 89th minute.

As the second of the two semi-final second legs played County already knew that their potential opponents in the final would be Wrexham who had beaten Kidderminster Harriers 5–2 on aggregate. Taking the 1–0 lead into the home game County would only need a draw to make it to Wembley. However, in front of a Rodney Parade record crowd Christian Jolley scored the only goal of the game to make it 2–0 on aggregate and book County's place in the final.

In order to win the final and promotion County needed to beat Wrexham, something which they had failed to do on each of their previous six Conference meetings. The game was billed as a battle between the league's best midfield against the most potent strike force. Wrexham's midfielders had shut out the County attack for 86 minutes, until Wrexham's David Artell got his head to a ball over the top but couldn't deal with it completely and Christian Jolley latched on to it and lifted the ball over Chris Maxwell to give County the late advantage.

As Wrexham pushed for a leveller they were caught on the counter-attack in injury time and their fate was sealed. Aaron O'Connor hammered the ball into the roof of the net, at the second attempt, after his initial effort was saved by Maxwell, to prompt wild celebrations from the County players, management and fans.

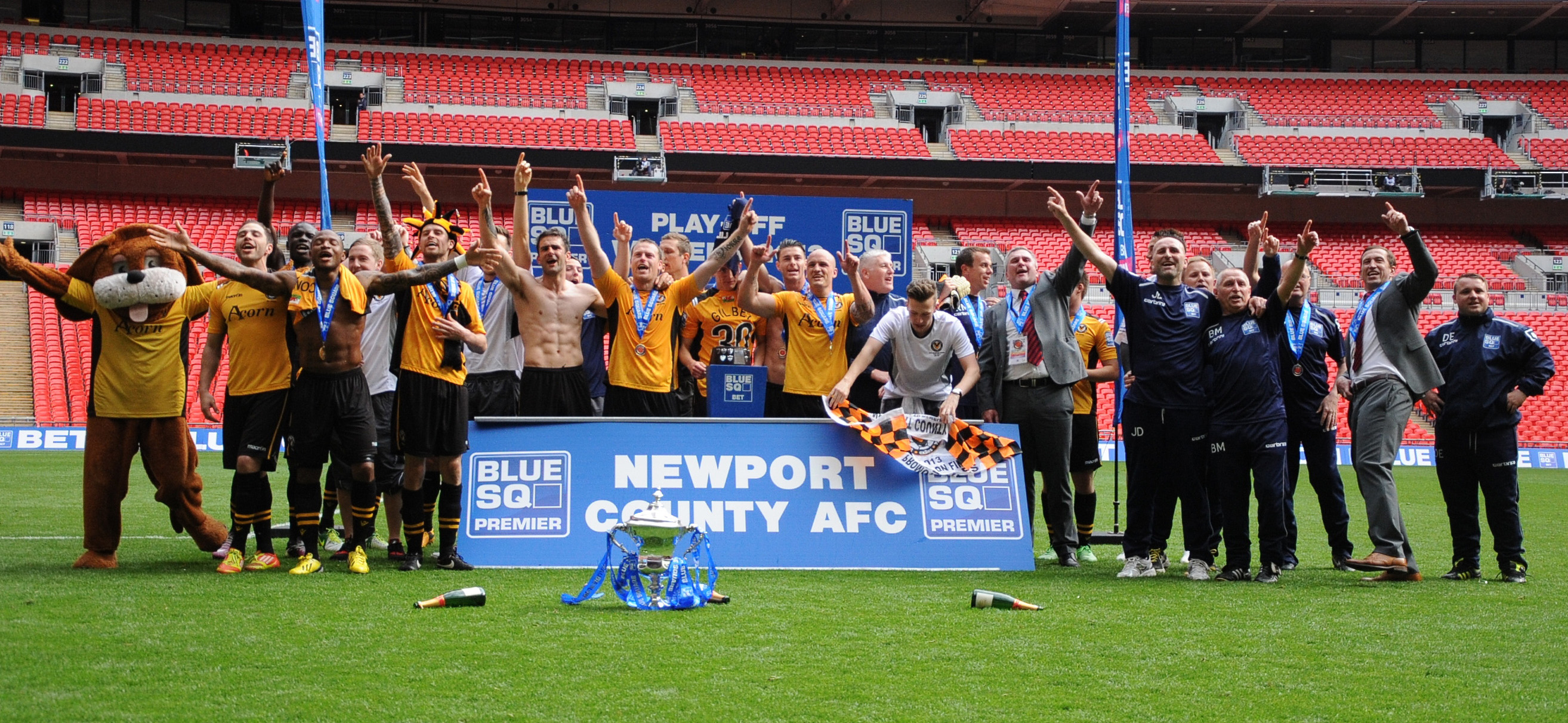
Newport County win the Conference National play-off winners' trophy at Wembley

==== Results summary ====
Overall								Home						Away					
Pld	W	D	L	GF	GA	GD	Pts	W	D	L	GF	GA	GD	W	D	L	GF	GA	GD
46	25	10	11	85	60	+25	85	13	5	5	43	27	+16	12	5	6	42	33	+9

Last updated: 20 April 2013.

==== Results by round ====
Round	1	2	3	4	5	6	7	8	9	10	11	12	13	14	15	16	17	18	19	20	21	22	23	24	25	26	27	28	29	30	31	32	33	34	35	36	37	38	39	40	41	42	43	44	45	46
Ground	A	H	H	A	H	A	A	H	A	H	A	H	A	H	A	H	H	A	H	H	A	H	A	H	H	A	H	H	H	A	H	A	A	A	H	A	A	A	H	A	A	H	H	H	A	A
Result	W	W	W	W	W	L	L	D	W	W	W	D	W	W	D	L	W	L	L	W	L	W	W	L	D	W	L	D	W	W	W	W	W	D	L	L	W	D	D	W	D	W	W	W	D	L
Position	3	1	1	1	1	1	3	4	1	1	1	2	1	1	1	1	1	1	2	1	3	1	2	3	3	2	2	5	4	4	3	4	3	4	4	4	4	4	4	3	4	4	3	3	3	3

Updated to match(es) played on 20 April 2013. Source: statto.com
A = Away; H = Home; W = Win; D = Draw; L = Loss

=== Cup ===
==== FA Cup ====
County were drawn away to Yate Town of the Southern League Division One South & West. When the match was played County were the highest-placed club left in the competition and Yate the lowest. Despite taking the lead as early as the 6th minute, County found themselves 3–1 down by the 69th. With two minutes of time remaining Aaron O'Connor scored County's second and Tony James the equaliser in the 4th minute of injury time to force a replay at Rodney Parade.

The replay began in a similar fashion with O'Connor opening the scoring in the 43rd minute for County to lead 1–0 at half time. On 65 minutes David Pipe was sent off for a second yellow card and minutes later the visitors were awarded and scored a soft penalty. This tied the score at 1–1 and extra time was needed. With two late goals Yate progressed into the First Round proper.

==== FA Trophy ====
There was no repeat of the previous season's Wembley final for County as they lost their First Round FA Trophy match 0–2 away to Conference South Welling United. Welling themselves went on to become champions of Conference South.

== Squad statistics ==
(Substitute appearances in brackets)

No.	Pos.	Name	League		Cup		Total	
No.	Pos.	Name	Apps	Goals	Apps	Goals	Apps	Goals
21	DF	(Wales) Byron Anthony	19 (2)	3	1 (0)	0	20 (2)	3
28	DF	(England) Michael Boateng	3 (0)	0	0 (0)	0	3 (0)	0
11	FW	(England) Ryan Charles	2 (8)	1	0 (2)	0	2 (10)	1
9	FW	(England) Danny Crow	20 (5)	3	0 (0)	0	20 (5)	3
26	MF	(England) Scott Donnelly	16 (2)	1	0 (0)	0	16 (2)	1
16	MF	(Wales) Lee Evans	18 (4)	3	2 (0)	0	20 (4)	3
34	FW	(England) Will Evans	3 (3)	0	0 (0)	0	3 (3)	0
17	MF	(Wales) Michael Flynn	28 (10)	2	1 (0)	0	29 (10)	2
30	MF	(England) Alex Gilbey	4 (1)	0	0 (0)	0	4 (1)	0
27	FW	(Wales) Rhys Griffiths	4 (6)	0	0 (0)	0	4 (6)	0
15	FW	(England) Jake Harris	0 (5)	0	0 (2)	0	0 (7)	0
3	DF	(Wales) Andrew Hughes	18 (8)	0	0 (1)	0	18 (9)	0
5	DF	(Wales) Tony James	41 (0)	2	3 (0)	1	44 (0)	3
23	FW	(England) Christian Jolley	22 (2)	14	1 (0)	0	20 (2)	14
1	GK	(Northern Ireland) Alan Julian	10 (1)	0	1 (0)	0	11 (1)	0
10	FW	(Dominica) Jefferson Louis	11 (6)	2	2 (0)	1	13 (6)	3
8	MF	(England) Lee Minshull	28 (7)	6	3 (0)	0	31 (7)	6
7	FW	(England) Aaron O'Connor	36 (3)	18	3 (0)	2	39 (3)	20
22	GK	(Wales) Joe Perry	0 (0)	0	0 (0)	0	0 (0)	0
40	GK	(England) Lenny Pidgeley	36 (0)	0	2 (0)	0	38 (0)	0
2	DF	(Wales) David Pipe	41 (0)	0	1 (0)	0	42 (0)	0
4	MF	(England) Max Porter	26 (0)	1	3 (0)	0	29 (0)	1
13	DF	(England) Andy Sandell	42 (0)	9	3 (0)	0	45 (0)	9
20	FW	(England) Michael Smith	9 (0)	4	1 (0)	0	10 (0)	4
12	MF	(Wales) Ben Swallow	7 (13)	2	3 (0)	0	10 (13)	2
14	MF	(Trinidad and Tobago) Jake Thomson	12 (10)	0	2 (0)	0	14 (10)	0
25	FW	(Northern Ireland) Conor Washington	5 (9)	1	0 (0)	0	5 (9)	1
24	FW	(England) Robbie Willmott	10 (9)	6	0 (0)	0	10 (9)	6
6	DF	(England) Ismail Yakubu	35 (1)	5	1 (0)	0	36 (1)	5

=== Transfers ===
==== In ====
Date	Pos.	Name	From	Fee
3 June 2012	GK	(Northern Ireland) Alan Julian	Stevenage	Free
11 June 2012	MF	(Trinidad and Tobago) Jake Thomson	Forest Green Rovers	Free
11 June 2012	FW	(Dominica) Jefferson Louis	Lincoln City	Free
13 June 2012	DF	(Wales) Tony James	Burton Albion	Free
19 June 2012	FW	(England) Danny Crow	Luton Town	Free
25 July 2012	FW	(England) Aaron O'Connor	Luton Town	Free
26 July 2012	MF	(Wales) Michael Flynn	Bradford City	Free
30 July 2012	GK	(England) Lenny Pidgeley	Exeter City	Free
1 September 2012	FW	(Northern Ireland) Conor Washington	St Neots Town	Undisclosed
15 November 2012	DF	(Wales) Byron Anthony	Hereford United	Free
10 January 2013	FW	(England) Robbie Willmott	Cambridge United	Undisclosed
11 January 2013	FW	(England) Christian Jolley	AFC Wimbledon	Undisclosed
31 January 2013	MF	(England) Scott Donnelly	Farnborough	Undisclosed
14 February 2013	FW	(Wales) Rhys Griffiths	Unattached	Free
19 March 2013	DF	(England) Michael Boateng	Sutton United	Free

==== Out ====
Date	Pos.	Name	To	Fee
15 May 2012	GK	(England) Glyn Thompson	Released	
15 May 2012	DF	(England) Lee Baker	Released	
15 May 2012	FW	(England) Elliott Buchanan	Released	
16 May 2012	MF	(England) Darryl Knights	Released	
16 May 2012	MF	(Wales) Troy Greening	Released	
16 May 2012	MF	(France) Guillaume Velez	Released	
16 May 2012	DF	(England) Paul Rodgers	Released	
29 May 2012	FW	(England) Sam Foley	Yeovil Town	None
3 June 2012	DF	(England) Gary Warren	Inverness Caledonian Thistle	None
27 June 2012	FW	(Scotland) Craig McAllister	Eastleigh	None
31 Oct 2012	MF	(Wales) Kris Fielden	Released	
31 Oct 2012	DF	(England) Mark Cooper	Released	
31 January 2013	MF	(Wales) Lee Evans	Wolverhampton Wanderers	Undisclosed
31 January 2013	FW	(Dominica) Jefferson Louis	Whitehawk	None
5 February 2013	FW	(England) Ryan Charles	Released	
1 May 2013	DF	(England) Michael Boateng	Released	
1 May 2013	FW	(England) Jake Harris	Released	
1 May 2013	GK	(Wales) Joe Perry	Released	
10 May 2013	MF	(Trinidad and Tobago) Jake Thomson	Released	
10 May 2013	GK	(Northern Ireland) Alan Julian	Released	
10 May 2013	MF	(England) Scott Donnelly	Released	
10 May 2013	MF	(Wales) Ben Swallow	Released	

==== Loans in ====
Date	Pos.	Name	From	Expiry
5 November 2012	FW	(England) Michael Smith	Charlton Athletic	4 January 2013
15 November 2012	FW	(England) Christian Jolley	AFC Wimbledon	12 January 2013
31 January 2013	FW	(England) Will Evans	Hereford United	1 May 2013
27 March 2013	MF	(England) Alex Gilbey	Colchester United	6 May 2013

==== Loans out ====
Date	Pos.	Name	To	Expiry
5 October 2012	DF	(England) Mark Cooper	Frome Town	5 November 2012
22 November 2012	FW	(Dominica) Jefferson Louis	Whitehawk	1 January 2013
2 January 2013	MF	(Trinidad and Tobago) Jake Thomson	Lincoln City	31 January 2013

== Fixtures and results ==
=== Pre-season friendlies ===
Date	Opponents	Venue	Result	Scorers	Attendance	Notes
Fri 6 Jul 2012	Undy Athletic	Playing Fields	1–3	Hughes		
Fri 13 Jul 2012	Moreton Rangers	London Road	1–1	J. Jones		
Sat 14 Jul 2012	Evesham United	Jubilee Stadium	3–0	Harris, Sandell, Louis		Carl Lewis Memorial Trophy
Sat 21 Jul 2012	Carmarthen Town	Richmond Park	1–3	Harris		
Tue 24 Jul 2012	Bristol Rovers	Rodney Parade	2–0	Louis, Fielden	1,549	
Fri 27 Jul 2012	Merthyr Town	Rodney Parade	2–2	Louis, Harris	701	
Tue 31 Jul 2012	Swansea City	Rodney Parade	2–2	O'Connor, Louis	891	
Fri 3 Aug 2012	Yeovil Town	Rodney Parade	1–3	Sandell	729	

=== Conference National ===
11 August 2012 1	Mansfield Town	3–4	Newport County	Mansfield
15:00	Speight 48'; Green 50'; Speight 89'	Report; Report; Report	Yakubu 10'; James 13'; O'Connor 56'; Louis 66'	Stadium: Field Mill; Attendance: 2,924; Referee: Chris Kavanagh

14 August 2012 2	Newport County	4–0	Nuneaton Town	Newport
19:45	O'Connor 13' 52'; Louis 20'; Evans 86'	Report; Report; Report		Stadium: Rodney Parade; Attendance: 2,646; Referee: Brett Huxtable

18 August 2012 3	Newport County	2–1	Lincoln City	Newport
15:00	O'Connor 7' 27'	Report; Report; Report	Taylor 51'	Stadium: Rodney Parade; Attendance: 3,024; Referee: Lee Swabey

25 August 2012 4	Braintree Town	1–2	Newport County	Braintree
15:00	Quinton 53'		Porter 69'; Yakubu 84'	Stadium: Cressing Road; Attendance: 611; Referee: Dean Treleaven

28 August 2012 5	Newport County	2–0	Hereford United	Newport
19:45	Sandell 75'; O'Connor 90'			Stadium: Rodney Parade; Attendance: 4,365; Referee: Graham Horwood

1 September 2012 6	Wrexham	2–0	Newport County	Wrexham
13:00	Cieslewicz 24'; Wright 82'			Stadium: Racecourse Ground; Attendance: 3,820; Referee: W Barratt

4 September 2012 7	Dartford	2–1	Newport County	Dartford
19:45	Crawford 49'; Rose 90'		O'Connor 54'	Stadium: Princes Park; Attendance: 1,446; Referee: Bull

8 September 2012 8	Newport County	0–0	Stockport County	Newport
15:00				Stadium: Rodney Parade; Attendance: 2,306; Referee: C. Breakspear

15 September 2012 9	Barrow	0–3	Newport County	Barrow-in-Furness
16:15			Evans 44'; Crow 70' 77'	Stadium: Holker Street; Attendance: 802; Referee: B. Toner

22 September 2012 10	Newport County	2–1	Southport	Newport
15:00	O'Connor 76'; Swallow 90'		Lever 18' (pen.)	Stadium: Rodney Parade; Attendance: 2,802; Referee: Bromley

25 September 2012 11	Telford United	2–4	Newport County	Telford
19:45	St Aimie 27'; James 81' (o.g.)		O'Connor 45'; Preston 49' (o.g.); Yakubu 72'; Sandell 78'	Stadium: New Bucks Head; Attendance: 1,503; Referee: K. Johnson

29 September 2012 12	Newport County	0–0	Grimsby Town	Newport
15:00				Stadium: Rodney Parade; Attendance: 2,968; Referee: C. Knowles

6 October 2012 13	Tamworth	1–2	Newport County	Tamworth
15:00	Cunnington 61'		Yakubu 45+4'; O'Connor 63'	Stadium: The Lamb Ground; Attendance: 1,201; Referee: N. Kinsley

9 October 2012 14	Newport County	1–0	Ebbsfleet United	Newport
19:45	Yakubu 30'			Stadium: Rodney Parade; Attendance: 2,453; Referee: P. Bankes

13 October 2012 15	Macclesfield Town	1–1	Newport County	Macclesfield
12:30	Barnes-Homer 81'		James 43'	Stadium: Moss Rose; Attendance: 1,544; Referee: D. Handley

27 October 2012 16	Newport County	2–3	Woking	Newport
15:00	Sandell 45'; Flynn 89'		Betsy 6' 15'; Bubb 67'	Stadium: Rodney Parade; Attendance: 2,088; Referee: B. Huxtable

6 November 2012 17	Newport County	6–2	Cambridge United	Newport
19:45	Minshull 16'; Flynn 17'; Sandell 30'; O'Connor 62' 70'; Smith 90'		Elliott 28'; Berry 69'	Stadium: Rodney Parade; Attendance: 1,787; Referee: R. Whitton

9 November 2012 18	Alfreton Town	4–3	Newport County	Alfreton
19:45	Arnold 6'; Clayton 17' 70'; Bradley 45' (pen.)		Smith 35'; O'Connor 60' 89'	Stadium: North Street; Attendance: 663; Referee: W. Barratt

17 November 2012 19	Newport County	1–3	Hyde	Newport
15:00	Jolley 55'		Jevons 29' (pen.); Ashworth 76'; Spencer 90'	Stadium: Rodney Parade; Attendance: 2,096; Referee: L. Swabey

1 December 2012 20	Newport County	3–1	Gateshead	Newport
12:30	Jolley 38' 56'; Smith 53'		Odubade 70'	Stadium: Rodney Parade; Attendance: 1,479; Referee: R. Martin

8 December 2012 21	Kidderminster Harriers	3–2	Newport County	Kidderminster
15:00	Matt 23' 58' 78'		Smith 31'; Evans 37'	Stadium: Aggborough Stadium; Attendance: 1,951; Referee: N. Kinseley

11 December 2012 22	Newport County	5–2	Luton Town	Newport
19:45	O'Connor 12'; Jolley 23' 67'; Henry 38' (o.g.); Sandell 64'		Gray 16'; Shaw 61'	Stadium: Rodney Parade; Attendance: 2,247; Referee: R. Whitton

26 December 2012 23	Forest Green Rovers	1–2	Newport County	Nailsworth
13:00	Brogan 47'		Swallow 70'; Charles 74'	Stadium: The New Lawn; Attendance: 2,332; Referee: W. Barratt

1 January 2013 24	Newport County	0–5	Forest Green Rovers	Newport
13:00			Norwood 38' 68' 78'; Klukowski 45'; Styche 74'	Stadium: Rodney Parade; Attendance: 2,787; Referee: G. Horwood

4 January 2013 25	Newport County	1–1	Wrexham	Newport
19:45	Porter 56'		Wright 34'	Stadium: Rodney Parade; Attendance: 3,627; Referee: Evans

12 January 2013 26	Lincoln City	2–4	Newport County	Lincoln
15:00	Oliver 44'; Bush 78'		O'Connor 22' 37'; Willmott 40' 45'	Stadium: Sincil Bank; Attendance: 1,970; Referee: D. Handley

19 January 2013 27	Newport County	0–2	Barrow	Newport
15:00			Flynn 41'; Rowe 68'	Stadium: Rodney Parade; Attendance: 2,107; Referee: L. Swabey

9 February 2013 28	Newport County	2–2	Tamworth	Newport
15:00	Donnelly 1'; Anthony 26'		Hendrie 74'; Cunnington 90+4' (pen.)	Stadium: Rodney Parade; Attendance: 1,712; Referee: K. Johnson

12 February 2013 29	Newport County	2–0	Mansfield Town	Newport
19:45	Sandell 66' (pen.); Jolley 78'			Stadium: Rodney Parade; Attendance: 1,902; Referee: C. Breakspear

16 February 2013 30	Woking	1–3	Newport County	Woking
15:00	Gavin McCallum 90+1'		Minshull 19' 34'; Anthony 37'	Stadium: Kingfield Stadium; Attendance: 2,116; Referee: W. Barratt

23 February 2013 31	Newport County	2–1	Telford United	Newport
15:00	Jolley 55'; Crow 75'		Trainer 90+1'	Stadium: Rodney Parade; Attendance: 1,761; Referee: L. Swabey

2 March 2013 32	Hyde	0–1	Newport County	Hyde
15:00			Jolley 10'	Stadium: Ewen Fields; Attendance: 640; Referee: G. Horwood

5 March 2013 33	Hereford United	2–3	Newport County	Hereford
19:45	O'Keefe 42' (pen.) 75' (pen.)		Minshull 72' 81'; Willmott 90+3'	Stadium: Edgar Street; Attendance: 2,519; Referee: R. Whitton

9 March 2013 34	Ebbsfleet United	1–1	Newport County	Northfleet
15:00	Enver-Marum 55'		Minshull 44'	Stadium: Stonebridge Road; Attendance: 808; Referee: Breakspear

19 March 2013 35	Newport County	1–2	Kidderminster Harriers	Newport
19:45	Sandell 30'		Gash 27'; Dunkley 90+2'	Stadium: Rodney Parade; Attendance: 2,652; Referee: N. Kingsley

23 March 2013 36	Stockport County	1–0	Newport County	Stockport
15:00	Minshull 60' (o.g.)			Stadium: Edgeley Park; Attendance: 3,154; Referee: Barrett

26 March 2013 37	Southport	0–2	Newport County	Southport
19:45			O'Connor 10'; Jolley 34'	Stadium: Haig Avenue; Attendance: 606; Referee: S. Stockbridge

28 March 2013 38	Gateshead	0–0	Newport County	Boston
19:45				Stadium: York Street; Attendance: 227; Referee: Ford

30 March 2013 39	Newport County	0–0	Dartford	Newport
15:00				Stadium: Rodney Parade; Attendance: 2,111; Referee: Horwood

1 April 2013 40	Nuneaton Town	1–2	Newport County	Nuneaton
15:00	Forsdick 15'		Willmott 58'; Armson 77' (o.g.)	Stadium: Liberty Way; Attendance: 1,068; Referee: Handley

5 April 2013 41	Cambridge United	0–0	Newport County	Cambridge
19:45				Stadium: Abbey Stadium; Attendance: 2,012; Referee: Whitton

9 April 2013 42	Newport County	1–0	Braintree Town	Newport
19:45	Washington 48'			Stadium: Rodney Parade; Attendance: 1,864; Referee: Breakspear

11 April 2013 43	Newport County	4–1	Macclesfield Town	Newport
19:45	Jolley 24'; Sandell 41' (pen.); Willmott 45' 65'		Burgess 3'	Stadium: Rodney Parade; Attendance: 1,606; Referee: Huxtable

13 April 2013 44	Newport County	2–0	Alfreton Town	Newport
15:00	Jolley 45'; Anthony 67'			Stadium: Rodney Parade; Attendance: 2,138; Referee: Johnson

16 April 2013 45	Luton Town	2–2	Newport County	Luton
19:45	Gray 12' 79'		Jolley 52' 84'	Stadium: Kenilworth Road; Attendance: 5,125; Referee: Bull

20 April 2013 46	Grimsby Town	3–0	Newport County	Cleethorpes
17:15	Devitt 18'; Thanoj 24'; Hearn 44'			Stadium: Blundell Park; Attendance: 4,555; Referee: Ford

=== Play-offs ===
24 April 2013 1st Leg	Grimsby Town	0–1	Newport County	Cleethorpes
19:45		Report	Yakubu 89'	Stadium: Blundell Park; Attendance: 5,414; Referee: Graham Horwood

28 April 2013 2nd Leg	Newport County	1–0 (2–0 agg.)	Grimsby Town	Newport
16:30	Jolley 31'	Report		Stadium: Rodney Parade; Attendance: 6,615; Referee: Kinsley

Final

5 May 2013
15:00 BST

Wrexham	0–2	Newport County
	Report; Report; Report; Report; Report; Report; Report	Jolley 86'; O'Connor 90+4'

Wembley Stadium, London
Attendance: 16,346
Referee: Michael Bull

Wrexham	Newport County

GK	24	(Wales) Chris Maxwell
RB	2	(England) Stephen Wright
CB	32	(England) David Artell
CB	6	(England) Martin Riley
LB	3	(England) Neil Ashton
RM	8	(England) Jay Harris		(substituted off) 89'
CM	12	(England) Dean Keates (C)		(substituted off) 80'
CM	14	(England) Joe Clarke
LM	16	(England) Johnny Hunt
CF	10	(England) Brett Ormerod	(yellow card) 64'
CF	11	(England) Andy Morrell		(substituted off) 69'
Substitutes:
GK	13	(England) Andy Coughlin
DF	23	(England) Chris Westwood
MF	17	(England) Glen Little		(substituted on) 80'
FW	7	(Poland) Adrian Cieslewicz		(substituted on) 69'
FW	31	(Nigeria) Dele Adebola		(substituted on) 89'
Manager:
(England) Andy Morrell

GK	40	(England) Lenny Pidgeley
CB	5	(Wales) Tony James
CB	6	(England) Ismail Yakubu
CB	21	(Wales) Byron Anthony
RM	2	(Wales) David Pipe (C)
CM	8	(England) Lee Minshull
CM	30	(England) Alex Gilbey	(yellow card) 79'
CM	17	(Wales) Michael Flynn		(substituted off) 74'
LM	13	(England) Andy Sandell
CF	23	(England) Christian Jolley
CF	9	(England) Danny Crow		(substituted off) 63'
Substitutes:
GK	1	(Northern Ireland) Alan Julian
DF	3	(Wales) Andrew Hughes
MF	26	(England) Scott Donnelly		(substituted on) 74'
FW	7	(England) Aaron O'Connor		(substituted on) 63'
FW	24	(England) Robbie Willmott
Manager:
(England) Justin Edinburgh

MATCH RULES

- 90 minutes.
- 30 minutes of extra-time if necessary.
- Penalty shootout if scores still level.
- Five named substitutes
- Maximum of three substitutions.

=== FA Cup ===
20 October 2012 4Q	Yate Town	3–3	Newport County	Yate
15:00	Knighton 50'; Page 54'; Groves 69'		Louis 6'; O'Connor 89'; James 90+3'	Stadium: Lodge Road; Attendance: 1,190; Referee: M. Bull

23 October 2012 4QR	Newport County	1–3 (a.e.t.)	Yate Town	Newport
19:45	O'Connor 43'; Pipe (yellow card) 36' (yellow-red card) 65'; Pidgeley (yellow card) 71'; Evans (yellow card) 101'		Page (yellow card) 44'; Knighton 71' (pen.); Wring (yellow card) 85'; Thomas 110'; Groves 115'	Stadium: Rodney Parade; Attendance: 1,463; Referee: P. Rees

=== FA Trophy ===
24 November 2012 1	Welling United	2–0	Newport County	Welling
15:00	Healy 37'; Martin 58'			Stadium: Park View Road; Attendance: 482; Referee: Chris Powell

== League table ==
Pos	Team	Pld	W	D	L	F	A	GD	Pts	Notes
1	Mansfield Town	46	30	5	11	92	52	+40	95	Champions, promoted
2	Kidderminster Harriers	46	28	9	9	82	40	+42	93	Play-offs
3	Newport County	46	25	10	11	85	60	+25	85	Play-off winners, promoted
4	Grimsby Town	46	23	14	9	70	38	+32	83	Play-offs
5	Wrexham	46	22	14	10	74	45	+29	80	Play-offs
6	Hereford United	46	19	13	14	73	63	+10	70	
7	Luton Town	46	18	13	15	70	62	+8	67	
8	Dartford	46	19	9	18	67	63	+4	66	
9	Braintree Town	46	19	9	18	63	72	−9	66	
10	Forest Green Rovers	46	18	11	17	63	49	+14	65	
11	Macclesfield Town	46	17	12	17	65	70	−5	63	
12	Woking	46	18	8	20	73	81	−8	62	
13	Alfreton Town	46	16	12	18	69	74	−5	60	
14	Cambridge United	46	15	14	17	68	69	−1	59	
15	Nuneaton Town	46	14	15	17	55	63	−8	57	
16	Lincoln City	46	15	11	20	66	73	−7	56	
17	Gateshead	46	13	16	17	58	61	−3	55	
18	Hyde	46	16	7	23	63	75	−12	55	
19	Tamworth	46	15	10	21	55	69	−14	55	
20	Southport	46	14	12	20	72	86	−14	54	
21	Stockport County	46	13	11	22	57	80	−23	50	Relegated
22	Barrow	46	11	13	22	45	83	−38	46	Relegated
23	Ebbsfleet United	46	8	15	23	55	89	−34	39	Relegated
24	Telford United	46	6	17	23	52	79	−27	35	Relegated

Key	
	Division Champions
	Promoted
	Into play-offs
	Relegated
