= David Pipe =

Welsh footballer (born 1983)

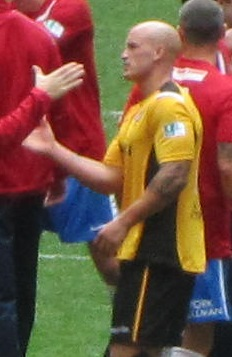
- Pipe after playing for Newport County in the 2012 FA Trophy Final

Personal information
- Full name: David Ronald Pipe
- Date of birth: 5 November 1983 (age 43)
- Place of birth: Machen, Wales
- Height: 5 ft 9 in (1.75 m)
- Positions: Midfielder; full-back

Youth career
- –2001: Coventry City

Senior career*
| Years | Team | Apps | (Gls) |
| 2001–2004 | Coventry City | 21 | (2) |
| 2004–2007 | Notts County | 141 | (4) |
| 2007–2010 | Bristol Rovers | 86 | (3) |
| 2009–2010 | → Cheltenham Town (loan) | 8 | (0) |
| 2011–2014 | Newport County | 100 | (0) |
| 2014–2016 | Forest Green Rovers | 66 | (1) |
| 2016–2017 | Eastleigh | 9 | (0) |
| 2017 | → Newport County (loan) | 21 | (0) |
| 2017–2019 | Newport County | 54 | (0) |
| Total | | 525 | (10) |

International career
| 2002–2005 | Wales U21 | 12 | (0) |
| 2003 | Wales | 1 | (0) |
- * Club domestic league appearances and goals

David Ronald Pipe (born 5 November 1983) is a Welsh former professional footballer who played as a midfielder or full-back.

== Club career ==
Born in Caerphilly, Wales, Pipe began his career in the youth system at Coventry City. He made his senior debut for the Sky Blues on 31 August 2002 as a second-half substitute for Gary McSheffrey in a 1–0 home defeat against Nottingham Forest. He scored his first senior goal in an away win over Gillingham on 5 October 2002 when he netted alongside Jay Bothroyd. At the start of the 2003–04 season, he was limited to just a single League Cup appearance.

=== Notts County ===
He subsequently joined Notts County on loan in January 2004. He made his debut for his new loan club three days later on 17 January 2004, helping them to a 1–0 away win over Wrexham. In April 2004, he had his contract at Coventry terminated, allowing him to join Notts County permanently on a two-year contract.

=== Bristol Rovers ===
Having been a mainstay of the Notts County squad for three consecutive seasons, Bristol Rovers paid £50,000 for his services in July 2007. His first appearance for Bristol Rovers came in a 1–1 away draw against Port Vale in August 2007.

He joined Cheltenham Town on loan in November 2009. His loan at Whaddon Road was then extended until the end of January 2010. He returned to Bristol Rovers at the end of the month but failed to make another appearance in the 2009–10 season. In June 2010, he was jailed for 38 months for fracturing the skull of another man in an unprovoked attack in Bristol in September 2009.

=== Newport County ===
In September 2011, he spent time training with Conference Premier side Newport County whom he signed for on a non-contract basis later that month. He made his debut for Newport County on 17 September 2011 playing 75 minutes in a 1–0 away defeat against Braintree Town. He helped Newport to the final of the 2011–12 FA Trophy at Wembley Stadium in May 2012, however was on the losing side as York City came out on top in a 2–0 win. Pipe was selected as Newport County's Player of the Year for the 2011–12 season.

In June 2012, he was appointed as captain of Newport County. Twelve months after he been a part of a side that had lost at Wembley in the FA Trophy final, he led Newport to the Football League as captain at Wembley in a 2–0 win over Wrexham in the 2013 Conference Premier play-off final on 5 May 2013. In June 2013, he was named in the 2012–13 Conference Premier team of the season

He was a regular in the Newport County side in their first year back in Football League Two, making 25 League Two appearances. However in February 2014, it was announced that he would be let go alongside Michael Flynn at the end of the season. Two months later, in April 2014, it was confirmed that he had been released by Newport. In the same month, he insisted there was no falling out with manager Justin Edinburgh in relation to the decision for him to be released.

=== Forest Green Rovers ===
On 7 May 2014, he joined Forest Green Rovers on a two-year deal, also being named captain at The New Lawn. He made his debut for the club on the opening day of the 2014–15 Conference Premier season on 9 August 2014, providing an assist in a 1–0 away win at Southport. He ended the 2014–15 season having helped Forest Green into the Conference National play-offs, only to be knocked out in the semi-finals by his former club, Bristol Rovers.

On 4 September 2015, he was named National League August Player of the Month after helping Forest Green to seven straight league victories in the opening month of the 2015–16 season. He scored his first goal for the club in a 2–2 derby draw with Cheltenham Town on 22 September 2015. He helped Forest Green reach the National League play-off final in May 2016, starting at Wembley Stadium in a 3–1 loss to Grimsby Town on 15 May 2016. The following day on 16 May 2016 he was released by the club.

=== Eastleigh ===
On 20 May 2016, after his release from Forest Green Rovers, Pipe joined Eastleigh on a one-year deal.

=== Return to Newport County ===
On 5 January 2017, Pipe returned to former club Newport County on loan until the end of the 2016–17 season. He made his second debut for Newport in the starting line-up in a 3–1 defeat to Stevenage in League Two on 7 January 2017. Pipe provided the left footed cross for Mark O'Brien's 89th-minute winner in a 2–1 victory at home to Notts County, which ensured Newport's survival in League Two on the final day of the 2016-17 season. Pipe was released by Eastleigh at the end of the 2016–17 season. On 18 May 2017 Pipe rejoined Newport County on a one-year contract. In February 2018, his contract was extended to the end of the 2018–19 season. He was part of the team that reached the League Two playoff final at Wembley Stadium on 25 May 2019, although he was an unused substitute in the final. Newport lost to Tranmere Rovers, 1-0 after a goal in the 119th minute. On 23 April 2019 Pipe announced his retirement from play at the end of the 2018-19 season.

== International career ==
Pipe earned his only international cap for Wales in 2003 in a friendly international against the United States. He had previously played for Wales at youth level and earned 12 caps for the under-21 team.

== Career statistics ==
As of match played 2 September 2017

Appearances and goals by club, season and competition
| Club | Season | League | | | FA Cup | | League Cup | | Other | | Total | |
| Club | Season | Division | Apps | Goals | Apps | Goals | Apps | Goals | Apps | Goals | Apps | Goals |
|---|---|---|---|---|---|---|---|---|---|---|---|---|
| Coventry City | 2002–03 | First Division | 21 | 2 | 1 | 0 | 2 | 0 | 0 | 0 | 24 | 2 |
| Coventry City | 2003–04 | First Division | 0 | 0 | 0 | 0 | 1 | 0 | 0 | 0 | 1 | 0 |
| Coventry City | Total | | 21 | 2 | 1 | 0 | 3 | 0 | 0 | 0 | 25 | 2 |
| Notts County | 2003–04 | Second Division | 18 | 0 | 0 | 0 | 0 | 0 | 0 | 0 | 18 | 0 |
| Notts County | 2004–05 | League Two | 41 | 2 | 4 | 0 | 2 | 0 | 1 (Note: Appearances in the Football League Trophy) | 0 | 48 | 2 |
| Notts County | 2005–06 | League Two | 43 | 2 | 2 | 0 | 1 | 0 | 0 | 0 | 46 | 2 |
| Notts County | 2006–07 | League Two | 39 | 0 | 1 | 0 | 2 | 0 | 0 | 0 | 42 | 0 |
| Notts County | Total | | 141 | 4 | 7 | 0 | 5 | 0 | 1 | 0 | 154 | 4 |
| Bristol Rovers | 2007–08 | League One | 40 | 2 | 7 | 0 | 2 | 0 | 1 | 0 | 50 | 2 |
| Bristol Rovers | 2008–09 | League One | 39 | 1 | 0 | 0 | 1 | 0 | 0 | 0 | 40 | 1 |
| Bristol Rovers | 2009–10 | League One | 7 | 0 | 0 | 0 | 2 | 0 | 1 | 0 | 10 | 0 |
| Bristol Rovers | Total | | 86 | 3 | 7 | 0 | 5 | 0 | 2 | 0 | 100 | 3 |
| Cheltenham Town (loan) | 2009–10 | League Two | 8 | 0 | 0 | 0 | 0 | 0 | 0 | 0 | 8 | 0 |
| Newport County | 2011–12 | Conference Premier | 34 | 0 | 1 | 0 | – | | 8 (Note: Appearances in the FA Trophy) | 0 | 43 | 0 |
| Newport County | 2012–13 | Conference Premier | 41 | 0 | 0 | 0 | – | | 3 (Note: Appearances in the Conference Premier play-offs) | 0 | 44 | 0 |
| Newport County | 2013–14 | League Two | 25 | 0 | 1 | 0 | 0 | 0 | 3 | 0 | 29 | 0 |
| Newport County | Total | | 100 | 0 | 2 | 0 | 0 | 0 | 14 | 0 | 116 | 0 |
| Forest Green Rovers | 2013–14 | Conference Premier | 34 | 0 | 0 | 0 | – | | 4 (Note: Two appearances in the FA Trophy and two in the Conference Premier play-offs) | 0 | 38 | 0 |
| Forest Green Rovers | 2015–16 | Conference Premier | 30 | 1 | 2 | 0 | – | | 3 (Note: One appearance in the FA Trophy and two in the Conference Premier play-offs) | 0 | 35 | 1 |
| Forest Green Rovers | Total | | 64 | 1 | 2 | 0 | – | | 7 | 0 | 73 | 1 |
| Eastleigh | 2016–17 | National League | 9 | 0 | 3 | 0 | – | | 0 | 0 | 12 | 0 |
| Newport County | 2016–17 | League Two | 21 | 0 | 0 | 0 | 0 | 0 | 0 | 0 | 21 | 0 |
| Newport County | 2017–18 | League Two | 2 | 0 | 0 | 0 | 2 | 0 | 1 | 0 | 5 | 0 |
| Newport County | Total | | 23 | 0 | 0 | 0 | 2 | 0 | 1 | 0 | 26 | 0 |
| Career total | | | 366 | 7 | 15 | 0 | 10 | 0 | 23 | 0 | 414 | 7 |

== Honours ==
Newport County

- Conference Premier play-offs: 2013
- FA Trophy runner-up: 2011–12

Individual

- Conference Premier Team of the Year: 2012–13
