= Jimmy Dack =

English footballer, coach, and manager

Personal information
- Date of birth: 2 June 1972 (age 54)
- Place of birth: Roehampton, England
- Position: Midfielder

Youth career
- Brentford

Senior career*
Years	Team	Apps	(Gls)
1989–1990	Epsom & Ewell		
1990–1993	Sutton United		
1993	→ Dorking (loan)		
1993–1994	Crawley Town	52	(11)
1994–1995	Carshalton Athletic		
1995–1998	Sutton United		
1998–1999	Aldershot Town		
1999–2001	Sutton United	29	(2)
2000–2001	Farnborough Town	41	(2)
2001–2002	Crawley Town	41	(5)
2002–2003	Tooting & Mitcham United		
2003	Carshalton Athletic (player/coach)		

Managerial career
- 2004: Carshalton Athletic (caretaker)
- 2008: Sutton United (caretaker)
- 2015: Newport County
- 2017: Whitehawk
- * Club domestic league appearances and goals

James Dack is an English professional football coach and manager. Most recently he is chief scout at Wigan Athletic.

== Playing career ==
Dack began his career as a youth at Brentford. After being released, he played as a midfielder for a number of non-league clubs, including two spells at both Crawley Town and Sutton United, as well as a season with Aldershot Town. He did not however make an appearance for a Football League club.

== Coaching and managerial career ==
Dack retired from playing in 2003. His first coaching role was at Carshalton Athletic where he was also briefly caretaker manager. In 2005, he was coaching at Stevenage. He joined Justin Edinburgh as assistant manager in 2006 at Fisher Athletic and then followed him to Grays Athletic in 2007. He was sacked from this post in September 2007.

Dack was caretaker manager at Sutton United in 2008 prior to the permanent appointment of Paul Doswell. He was offered the post at the end of the season but turned it down and decided to work instead as assistant manager at Welling United. In 2009, Dack left Welling United to take the assistant manager's role at Woking. He was suspended from this role along with manager Graham Baker in January 2011.

On 4 October 2011, Justin Edinburgh was appointed manager at Newport County in the Conference National league and two days later Dack was named as his assistant manager.

In the 2012–13 season Newport attained a third-place finish, reaching the Conference National playoffs. Newport County won the 2013 Conference Premier play-off final versus Wrexham at Wembley Stadium 2–0 to return to the Football League after a 25-year absence with promotion to Football League Two.

On their return to the Football League in the 2013–14 season, Newport County finished 14th in League Two.

On 7 February 2015, with Newport County in sixth place in League Two, it was confirmed that Edinburgh had been appointed manager at League One Gillingham with Dack stepping up to caretaker manager at Newport County assisted by Wayne Hatswell. Dack's first match in charge was a 2–0 defeat at AFC Wimbledon on the same day. On 24 February Dack was confirmed as team manager until the end of the 2014–15 season. On 29 April, Dack stated he had been offered the manager's job beyond the end of the season but he had decided to move on after the final game of the season. Newport finished the 2014–15 season in ninth place in League Two. Terry Butcher was appointed team manager of Newport County on 30 April 2015.

In June 2015, Dack was appointed assistant manager to Mark Yates at previous club Crawley Town. Yates and Dack were sacked by Crawley on 26 April 2016. In January 2017, Dack was appointed assistant manager to Andy Woodman at National League South side Whitehawk, and succeeded him in the post before the start of the 2017–18 season. On 28 August 2017 with Whitehawk at the bottom of the league after picking up only one point from the first seven games of the 2017–2018 season, Dack resigned.
