= Les Scadding =

Lottery winner and football club chairman

- Born: 1955 or 1956 (age 69–70); Bristol, England
- Known for: UK£45.5 million lottery win in 2009
- Television: The Welsh Millionaires Club
- Spouse(s): Rose-Marie (m. 1982 / 1983; div. 2000); Samantha Peachey (m. 20??; div. 2013)
- Children: 3

Les Scadding (born 1955 / 1956) is an English former mechanic who acquired media attention as the winner of UK£45.5 million (equivalent to £66.5 million in 2024) on the EuroMillions lottery in 2009. Following his win, he invested a portion of the money in becoming the major shareholder of Newport County A.F.C. and acted as the club's chairman between 2012 and 2015.

== Biography ==
Born in Bristol, Scadding married his first wife, Rose-Marie, in 1982 / 1983; they were married for 27 years, and had two daughters and a son together, before divorcing in 2000. At the time of his lottery win, the then-53-year-old Scadding had for some time been resident in Newport, Wales, where he lived with his second wife, 38-year-old Samantha Peachey-Scadding. Scadding had been unemployed for a year before buying the winning ticket, and had overcome testicular cancer some years earlier.

In June 2009, Scadding and his wife won UK£45.5 million (equivalent to £66.5 million in 2024) through the lottery EuroMillions. At that time, it was the largest single lottery win in the United Kingdom, exceeding a 2007 win of £35 million (equivalent to £57 million in 2024), by a person in Scotland. Scadding gave each of his three children an undisclosed seven-figure sum, but did not share any with their mother. Scadding and his second wife separated in 2013.

== Television ==
In August 2014, marking the 20th anniversary of the National Lottery being introduced in the United Kingdom, Scadding was the presenter on The Welsh Millionaires Club, a four-part TV series for ITV Cymru Wales.

== Newport County ==
In August 2012, Scadding succeeded Chris Blight as the chairman of Newport County A.F.C., a club in the lowest of the five nationwide professional football divisions in England, shortly after accepting an offer to join their board of directors. Just over eight months after he took the position, under manager Justin Edinburgh, Newport defeated fellow Welsh club Wrexham in the 2013 Conference Premier play-off final, to gain promotion to the Football League following a 25-year absence.

On 18 June 2015, Scadding resigned his positions as both the chairman and a director at Newport County. It was later reported that Scadding wished to spend more time at his holiday home in Barbados. On 1 October 2015 Newport County Supporters' Trust took over ownership of the club.
