= Robbie Willmott =

English footballer (born 1990)

Personal information
- Full name: Robbie James Willmott
- Date of birth: 16 May 1990 (age 36)
- Place of birth: Harlow, England
- Height: 5 ft 9 in (1.75 m)
- Positions: Winger; midfielder

Team information
- Current team: Newport City (player/ manager)

Youth career
- Buntingford Town
- 2006–2007: Cambridge United

Senior career*
Years	Team	Apps	(Gls)
2006–2007	Cambridge Regional College		
2007–2011	Cambridge United	108	(19)
2011–2012	Luton Town	54	(14)
2012–2013	Cambridge United	20	(2)
2013–2015	Newport County	83	(10)
2015–2016	Ebbsfleet United	12	(0)
2015	→ Eastleigh (loan)	1	(0)
2016	→ Bishop's Stortford (loan)	18	(2)
2016–2017	Chelmsford City	43	(3)
2017–2023	Newport County	158	(7)
2021	→ Exeter City (loan)	17	(1)
2023	→ Walsall (loan)	8	(0)
2023–2024	Woking	8	(0)
2023–2024	→ Weston-super-Mare (loan)	32	(3)
2024–2026	Barry Town United	62	(4)
2026–	Newport City	4	(0)

International career^{‡}
2011	England C	1	(0)

Managerial career
- 2026–: Newport City
- * Club domestic league appearances and goals as of 06:27, 10 October 2026 (UTC) ‡ National team caps and goals as of 19:56, 21 April 2024 (UTC)

Robbie James Willmott (born 16 May 1990) is an English footballer who plays as a winger or midfielder. He is currently player-manager of Cymru South club Newport City.

== Youth career ==
In the summer of 2006, head of Cambridge United's youth development Jez George spotted Willmott playing for Buntingford Town under 16's against Cambridge City and offered him a weeks trial at Cambridge United. Willmott joined United as a scholar and went on to play for Cambridge Regional College in the Eastern Counties Football League to gain further experience in a competitive environment.

== Club career ==
=== Cambridge United ===
Willmott was a product of Cambridge's youth system. He made his senior debut for the club at the age of 17 on 15 September 2007. Willmott was brought on for the last ten minutes at the Abbey Stadium as Cambridge ran out 2–1 winners against Crawley Town. The winger signed his first professional contract with Cambridge United in December 2007 and went on to score his first senior goal for United in the FA Cup against Boston United at their York Street ground on 25 October 2008, his overall performance deserving of the man of the match award, an award that Cambridge United manager at the time Gary Brabin concurred with.

Willmott featured in Cambridge United's Conference Premier play-off final defeat to Torquay United at Wembley Stadium in May 2009. He started in the final and the second leg of the semi-final, a game in which he scored for United.

In January 2010, Willmott became an outlandish transfer target for fellow Conference club Histon but Cambridge United turned their offer down.

Later that year, Willmott criticised former Cambridge United players Danny Crow and Dan Gleeson for joining Conference rivals Luton Town during the summer, he said "But if they (Crow & Gleeson) don't want to play for the club and they don't want to do the graft to get the club into the Football League, then fine. We don't want players who aren't going to put 100% into the team."

Cambridge United sold Willmott to Luton Town in January 2011 for a transfer fee of £50,000. On his departure former Cambridge United manager Martin Ling said of Willmott "I feel it's a good move for Robbie, on a football front I'm disappointed to lose a player of his quality, He will be hard to replace from within but that's where it's got to be. Sometimes you have to manage difficult situations."

=== Luton Town ===
On signing Willmott, former Luton Town manager Richard Money said "There were a lot of clubs interested in him...I think it's fair to say that most of the bigger clubs in our division were interested in him and one or two clubs as far up as the Championship. We tried to sign him two or three times and it's always nice, with Monday still to come, to get the deal done with some comfort."

He made his debut for the Hatters on 1 February 2011, coming on as a sub in Luton Town's 4–0 victory over Darlington at Kenilworth Road. and scored his first goal on his full debut at Newport County on 18 February 2011.

In May 2011, Willmott played in his second Conference Premier play-off final, this time at the City of Manchester Stadium, and once again found himself on the losing side.

At the end of the 2010–11 season, Willmott was acclaimed as one of the season's star performers with his inclusion in the Conference team of the season, the only Luton Town player to be represented. As such, he was the subject of transfer speculation in August 2011 when Forest Green Rovers made two bids for him which Luton Town rejected out of hand.

After a disappointing 1–1 draw against AFC Telford in December 2011 Willmott, Luton Town's goal scorer, jumped to the defence of under-fire Luton Town manager Gary Brabin when he said "We're all 100 per cent behind the gaffer. We're all working hard in training, we're all committed to the gaffer and we believe he is the man to take us up the league."

=== Return to Cambridge United ===
Willmott was released by Luton Town at the end of the 2011–12 season and became a free agent. On 17 July 2012, he re-signed with Cambridge United on a two-year contract, less than two years after departing the U's.

=== Newport County ===
Willmott joined Newport County on 10 January 2013 and scored two goals on his début in a 4–2 away win at Lincoln City on 12 January. In the 2012–13 season he was part of the Newport team that finished 3rd in the league, reaching the Conference Premier play-offs. Newport County won the play-off final versus Wrexham at Wembley stadium 2–0 to return to the Football League after a 25-year absence with promotion to Football League Two.

He was released by Newport manager Terry Butcher in May 2015 at the end of his contract along with ten other senior players in a cost cutting drive.

=== Ebbsfleet United ===
On 4 June 2015 Willmott joined Conference South club Ebbsfleet United.

==== Eastleigh (loan) ====
On 26 November 2015 Willmott joined National League side Eastleigh on a loan until 2 January 2016.

=== Chelmsford City ===
In July 2016, Willmott signed for Chelmsford City alongside Corby Moore, following former manager Rod Stringer to the club. On 16 August 2016, Willmott made his debut against Truro City, going on to pick up an assist. At the end of the 2016–17 season Willmott collected the Player of the Year award for Chelmsford after contributing over 30 assists in his single season at the club. During his time at Chelmsford, Willmott worked in a local supermarket alongside playing for the club.

=== Return to Newport County ===
On 18 May 2017, Willmott re-joined Newport County on a two-year contract. He made his second debut for Newport on the opening day of the 2017–18 season, in a 3–3 draw at Stevenage. Whilst at Newport, Willmott lived with teammates including Joss Labadie across the road from Newport's ground, Rodney Parade.

On 7 January 2018, Willmott assisted the second goal for Shawn McCoulsky in the 2–1 FA Cup 3rd Round win against Championship club Leeds United. On 27 January 2018 Willmott assisted the goal for Pádraig Amond in the 1–1 FA Cup 4th Round draw against Premier League club Tottenham Hotspur. Tottenham won the replay 2–0.

On 6 January 2019, Willmott assisted the first goal for Jamille Matt in the 2–1 FA Cup 3rd Round win against Premier League club Leicester City. On 5 February 2019 Willmott scored the first goal and assisted the second goal for Pádraig Amond in the 2–0 FA Cup 4th Round replay win against Championship club Middlesbrough. On 8 February 2019 he signed a two-year contract extension to the end of the 2020–21 season. In the FA Cup 5th round on 16 February 2019 Willmott provided the assist for Amond's goal in Newport's 4–1 defeat against reigning Premier League champions Manchester City. Willmott was part of the team that reached the League Two playoff final at Wembley Stadium on 25 May 2019. Newport lost to Tranmere Rovers, 1-0 after a goal in the 119th minute. In June 2021 Willmott signed a one-year contract extension with Newport County to the end of the 2021-22 season. In March 2022 he extended his contract until the end of the 2022-23 season. He was released by Newport at the end of the 2022-23 season.

==== Exeter City (loan) ====
On 1 February 2021, Willmott joined League Two side Exeter City on loan for the remainder of the 2020-21 season. He made his debut for Exeter as a second-half substitute in the 1-0 League Two win against Stevenage on 2 February 2021. He made his home debut for Exeter in the starting line-up for the 3-2 League Two win against Bradford City on 6 February 2021, providing the assist for Exeter's second goal. He scored his first Exeter goal in the 2-1 League Two win against Colchester United on 23 February 2021.

==== Walsall (loan) ====
On 5 January 2023, Willmott joined fellow League Two club Walsall on loan until the end of the 2022–23 season.

=== Woking ===
On 16 June 2023 Willmott joined National League club Woking on a permanent contract.

On 20 October 2023, Willmott joined National League South side, Weston-super-Mare on loan for the remainder of the season.

On 26 April 2024, it was announced that Willmott would leave Woking at the end of his contract in June.

=== Barry Town United ===
On 1 August 2024, Willmott joined Cymru Premier club Barry Town United.

=== Newport City ===
On 31 July 2026, whilst first team coach at Newport City, Willmott made his debut for Newport City on the opening day of the 2026-27 Cymru South season, in a 4-1 win at Llanelli Town.

== International career ==
Willmott was first called up for England C duty in February 2011 but had to withdraw from the squad to face Belgium in the semi-finals of the International Challenge trophy due to injury.

He was once again called up for England C in August 2011 in a squad for a friendly with India U23. However, the game was cancelled shortly afterwards.

He finally made his England C debut in a friendly against Gibraltar on 15 November 2011, starting the match before being replaced at half time in a 3–1 defeat.

== Coaching career ==
On 27 April 2026, Willmott was appointed manager of Cymru South club Newport City.

== Style of play ==
Willmott is comfortable playing on either wing or as a wing-back, and has also played centrally as an attacking midfielder. He is known for his pace and his ability to dribble and deliver crosses.

== Career statistics ==
=== Club ===
As of match played 20 April 2024

Appearances and goals by club, season and competition
Club	Season	League			FA Cup		League Cup		Other		Total	
Club	Season	Division	Apps	Goals	Apps	Goals	Apps	Goals	Apps	Goals	Apps	Goals
Cambridge United	2007–08	Conference Premier	15	0	0	0	~	~	1 (Note: Appearance in the Conference League Cup)	0	16	0
Cambridge United	2008–09	Conference Premier	39	7	1	0	~	~	1 (Note: Appearances in the FA Trophy)	0	41	7
Cambridge United	2009–10	Conference Premier	27	2	2	0	~	~	0	0	29	2
Cambridge United	2010–11	Conference Premier	27	10	2	0	~	~	3	0	32	10
Cambridge United	Cambridge United		108	19	5	0	~	~	5	0	118	19
Luton Town	2010–11	Conference Premier	15	6	0	0	~	~	3 (Note: Appearances in the Conference Premier play-offs)	0	18	6
Luton Town	2011–12	Conference Premier	39	8	2	0	~	~	8 (Note: Five appearances in the FA Trophy and three in the Conference Premier play-offs)	1	49	9
Luton Town	Luton Town		54	14	2	0	~	~	11	1	67	15
Cambridge United	2012–13	Conference Premier	20	2	0	0	~	~	1	0	21	2
Newport County	2012–13	Conference Premier	19	6	0	0	~	~	2	0	21	6
Newport County	2013–14	League Two	46	3	2	3	2	0	3 (Note: Appearances in the Football League Trophy)	0	53	6
Newport County	2014–15	League Two	16	1	0	0	1	0	1	0	18	1
Newport County	Newport County		81	10	2	3	3	0	6	0	92	13
Ebbsfleet United	2015–16	Conference South	12	0	0	0	~	~	0	0	12	0
Eastleigh (loan)	2015–16	Conference Premier	1	0	0	0	~	~	0	0	1	0
Bishop's Stortford (loan)	2015–16	Conference South	18	2	0	0	~	~	0	0	18	2
Chelmsford City	2016–17	National League South	43	3	0	0	~	~	4	1	47	4
Newport County	2017–18	League Two	39	2	5	0	2	0	1	0	47	2
Newport County	2018–19	League Two	31	2	6	1	0	0	6 (Note: Appearances in the Football League Trophy & League Two Play-Off's)	0	43	3
Newport County	2019–20	League Two	27	0	2	0	1	0	2	0	32	0
Newport County	2020–21	League Two	19	0	3	0	4	0	2	0	28	0
Newport County	2021–22	League Two	30	3	1	0	1	0	1	0	33	3
Newport County	2022–23	League Two	12	0	0	0	2	0	3	0	17	0
Newport County	Newport County		158	7	19	1	8	0	12	0	197	8
Exeter City (loan)	2020–21	League Two	17	1	0	0	0	0	0	0	17	1
Walsall (loan)	2022–23	League Two	8	0	2	0	0	0	0	0	10	0
Woking	2023–24	National League	8	0	1	0	—		0	0	9	0
Weston-super-Mare (loan)	2023–24	National League South	32	3	0	0	—		2	0	35	3
Career total			560	61	28	4	12	0	43	2	643	67
