= Aaron O'Connor =

English football player (born 1983)

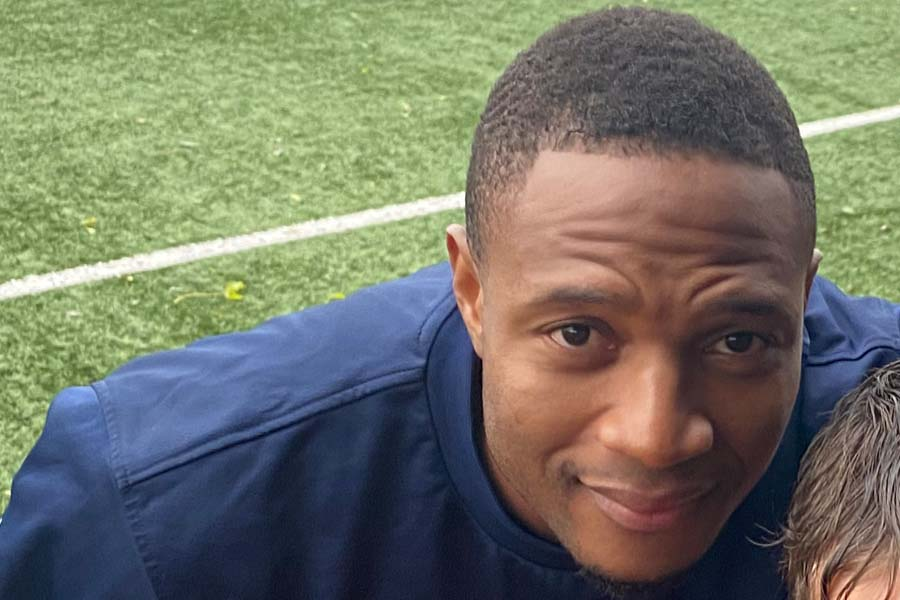
- O'Connor in October 2020

Personal information
- Full name: Aaron Derek O'Connor
- Date of birth: 9 August 1983 (age 43)
- Place of birth: Nottingham, England
- Position: Forward

Team information
- Current team: Barwell

Senior career*
Years	Team	Apps	(Gls)
2002	Ilkeston Town		
2002–2003	Scunthorpe United	3	(0)
2003	Nuneaton Borough		
2003–2004	Ilkeston Town		
2004–2007	Gresley Rovers	99	(73)
2007–2008	Grays Athletic	63	(8)
2008–2009	Mansfield Town	39	(8)
2009–2011	Rushden & Diamonds	75	(24)
2011–2012	Luton Town	34	(5)
2012–2015	Newport County	82	(29)
2015–2016	Forest Green Rovers	20	(9)
2016	→ Stevenage (loan)	3	(0)
2016	Stevenage	10	(1)
2016–2020	Kettering Town	116	(59)
2020–2021	Tamworth	4	(0)
2021–2022	Basford United	15	(4)
2022–2023	Carlton Town	35	(14)
2023–2026	Eastwood		
2026–	Barwell	0	(0)
- * Club domestic league appearances and goals as of 18:30, 24 July 2026 (UTC)

Aaron Derek O'Connor (born 9 August 1983) is an English footballer who plays for Northern Premier League Division One Midlands club Barwell, where he plays as a forward.

== Playing career ==
=== Scunthorpe United ===
Born in Nottingham, Nottinghamshire, O'Connor started his career at Ilkeston Town before moving to Third Division side Scunthorpe United on 12 December 2002. However, O'Connor featured in just three games as a substitute. Manager Brian Laws released the 19-year-old in February 2003, claiming he did not have the right attitude for the professional club.

=== Nuneaton Borough and Ilkeston Town ===
O'Connor had a brief spell at Nuneaton Borough at the start of the 2003–04 season, before moving back to Ilkeston Town.

=== Gresley Rovers ===
He then moved onto Gresley Rovers in July 2004. He spent two and a half seasons at Gresley, winning the Player's Player of The Year, Manager's Player of The Year and Supporter's Player of The Year awards in both seasons. O'Connor had a very impressive record of scoring 80 goals in 127 appearances for the club in all competitions. He had a two-week trial with Rushden & Diamonds in June 2006.

=== Grays Athletic ===
Grays Athletic announced the signing of O'Connor on 5 January 2007, and he made his debut the following day against Southport in the Conference National. Despite being offered a new contract for the 2008–09 season, he did not sign and subsequently was released.

=== Mansfield Town ===
He was signed by Mansfield Town on 8 August 2008, where he made 39 appearances in the Conference Premier, scoring eight goals. He was released at the end of the 2008–09 season.

=== Rushden & Diamonds ===
On 17 June 2009, O'Connor signed for Rushden & Diamonds on a one-year contract. He signed a one-year contract extension in May 2010. Over the course of two seasons, in which he was appointed Rushden's club captain, O'Connor scored 27 goals in 78 games.

=== Luton Town ===
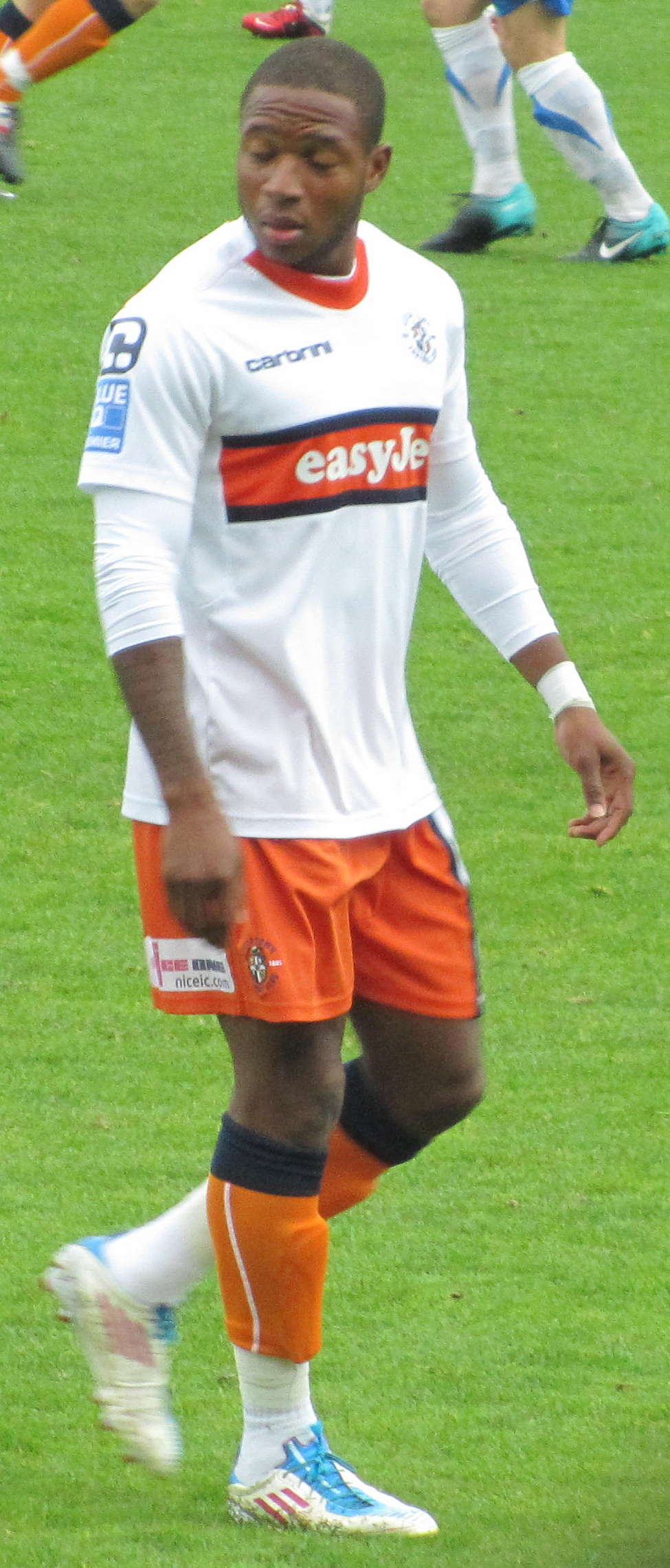
O'Connor playing for Luton Town in 2011

O'Connor left Rushden & Diamonds and joined Luton Town on a free transfer on 6 June 2011.

=== Newport County ===
In July 2012, O'Connor was reunited with former Rushden & Diamonds manager Justin Edinburgh when he signed for Newport County. In August 2012 O'Connor was selected as Conference Player of the Month after Newport County won all five of their opening matches of the 2012–13 season with O'Connor scoring six goals. He was part of the Newport team that finished third in the league, reaching the Conference Premier play-offs. Newport won the 2013 Conference Premier play-off final versus Wrexham at Wembley Stadium 2–0 to return to the Football League after a 25-year absence with promotion to League Two. O'Connor scored the second goal. He was released by Newport in May 2015 at the end of his contract.

=== Forest Green Rovers ===
On 12 June 2015, he joined National League club Forest Green Rovers on a one-year deal. He made his debut for the club on the opening day of the 2015–16 season in a 1–0 away win against Altrincham. His first goal followed in his second appearance, as his first half strike against Welling United at The New Lawn proved to be enough to secure a 1–0 victory.

=== Stevenage ===
He joined League Two side Stevenage on a one-month loan on 15 January 2016. He made his Stevenage debut the following day on 16 January 2016, playing 81 minutes in a 3–2 away loss against Plymouth Argyle. On 1 February 2016, he secured a permanent move to Stevenage after he had his contract cancelled by Forest Green by mutual consent. He was released by Stevenage in May 2016.

=== Kettering Town ===
O'Connor joined Kettering Town on 3 September 2016, and was voted the Fans' and Overall Player of the Year for the season 2017–18.

=== Tamworth ===
It was confirmed on 15 July 2020, that O'Connor had signed for Southern League Premier Division Central side Tamworth. He made his debut for Tamworth on 29 September 2020 in a 2–1 home victory over Barwell, coming on as a 78th minute substitute for Gerry McDonagh.

=== Basford United ===
O'Connor signed for Northern Premier League Premier Division side Basford United on 6 August 2021.

=== Eastwood ===
On 3 June 2023, O'Connor signed for Eastwood.

=== Barwell ===
O'Connor signed for newly relegated Northern Premier League Division One Midlands side Barwell on the 10 July 2026.

== Career statistics ==
=== Club ===
As of end of 2022–23 season

Appearances and goals by club, season and competition
Club	Season	League			National Cup		League Cup		Other		Total	
Club	Season	Division	Apps	Goals	Apps	Goals	Apps	Goals	Apps	Goals	Apps	Goals
Ilkeston Town	2001–02	Southern Football League Premier Division	—		—		—		—		—	
Ilkeston Town	2002–03	Southern Football League Premier Division	—		—		—		—		—	
Scunthorpe United	2002–03	Third Division	3	0	0	0	0	0	0	0	3	0
Nuneaton Borough	2003–04	Southern Football League Premier Division	—		—		—		—		—	
Ilkeston Town	2003–04	Southern Football League Western Division	—		—		—		—		—	
Gresley Rovers	2004–05	Northern Premier League Division One	—		—		—		—		—	
Gresley Rovers	2005–06	Northern Premier League Division One	—		—		—		—		—	
Gresley Rovers	2006–07	Northern Premier League Division One	—		—		—		—		—	
Grays Athletic	2006–07	Football Conference	15	4	0	0	—		0	0	15	4
Grays Athletic	2007–08	Football Conference	46	4	0	0	—		0	0	46	4
Grays Athletic	Grays Athletic		61	8	0	0	0	0	0	0	61	8
Mansfield Town	2008–09	Conference National	29	8	0	0	—		0	0	29	8
Rushden & Diamonds	2009–10	Conference National	38	10	0	0	—		0	0	38	10
Rushden & Diamonds	2010–11	Conference National	36	14	0	0	—		0	0	36	14
Rushden & Diamonds	Rushden & Diamonds		74	28	0	0	0	0	0	0	74	28
Luton Town	2011–12	Conference National	34	5	0	0	—		0	0	34	5
Newport County	2012–13	Conference National	39	18	0	0	—		0	0	39	18
Newport County	2013–14	League Two	4	1	0	0	0	0	0	0	4	1
Newport County	2014–15	League Two	39	10	0	0	0	0	0	0	39	10
Newport County	Newport County		82	29	0	0	0	0	0	0	82	29
Forest Green Rovers	2015–16	Conference National	20	9	0	0	—		0	0	20	9
Stevenage (loan)	2015–16	League Two	3	0	0	0	0	0	0	0	3	0
Stevenage	2015–16	League Two	10	1	0	0	0	0	0	0	10	1
Kettering Town	2016–17	Southern League Premier Division	31	15	3	0	—		0	0	34	15
Kettering Town	2017–18	Southern League Premier Division	41	32	4	3	—		0	0	45	35
Kettering Town	2018–19	Southern League Premier Division Central	27	10	1	0	—		0	0	28	10
Kettering Town	2019–20	National League North	17	2	0	0	—		0	0	17	2
Kettering Town	Kettering Town		116	59	8	3	0	0	0	0	124	62
Tamworth	2020–21	Southern League Premier Division Central	4	0	2	0	0	0	1 (Note: One appearance in FA Trophy)	0	7	0
Basford United	2021–22	Northern Premier League Premier Division	15	4	3	0	0	0	2	2	20	6
Carlton Town	2021–22	Northern Premier League Division One Midlands	15	9	0	0	0	0	1	1	16	10
Carlton Town	2022–23	Northern Premier League Division One East	20	5	0	0	—		2	0	22	5
Carlton Town	Total		35	14	0	0	0	0	3	1	38	15
Career total			486	167	11	3	0	0	6	3	505	171

== Honours ==
=== Club ===
Kettering Town

- Northamptonshire Cup: 2017–18;
- Northamptonshire Senior Cup: 2017–18
- Southern League Premier Division Central: 2018–19
