= Ismail Yakubu =

Nigerian footballer

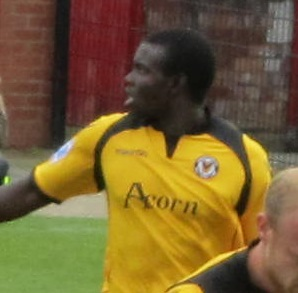
- Yakubu playing for Newport County in 2012

Personal information
- Full name: Ismail Salami Yakubu
- Date of birth: 8 April 1985 (age 41)
- Place of birth: Kano, Nigeria
- Position: Defender

Team information
- Current team: Pontypridd United (assistant manager)

Youth career
- 1996–2001: Barnet

Senior career*
Years	Team	Apps	(Gls)
2001–2010	Barnet	260	(14)
2010–2011	AFC Wimbledon	27	(2)
2011–2015	Newport County	120	(15)
2011	→ Cambridge United (loan)	0	(0)
2015–2017	Woking	32	(2)
2017–2019	Hemel Hempstead Town	55	(2)
2019	Kingstonian	11	(0)
2019–2020	Hayes & Yeading United	10	(0)
2019–2020	→ Merthyr Town (loan)	15	(1)
2020	Merthyr Town	0	(0)
2020–2021	Penybont	21	(0)
2021–2023	Merthyr Town	45	(3)
2023–2025	Cinderford Town	42	(5)
2026	Pontypridd United	4	(0)

International career^{‡}
2004–2005	England C	6	(0)
- * Club domestic league appearances and goals as of 16:58, 15 December 2025 (UTC) ‡ National team caps and goals as of 12:54, 11 August 2016 (UTC)

Ismail Salami Yakubu (born 8 April 1985) is a Nigerian retired professional footballer who played as a defender. He is currently assistant manager at Pontypridd United. He has been capped for the England semi-professional team.

== Club career ==
=== Barnet ===
Yakubu was born in Kano, Kano State, and raised in England. He joined Barnet at the age of 11, turned professional at 16, and made his first-team debut at the age of 17 while still studying for his A-levels – a 3–2 defeat against rivals Stevenage, with Yakubu coming on as a 67th-minute substitute. He started the following match in a 1–1 draw with Boston United. He became a regular in the first-team squad, and was team captain from August 2007 to November 2008. In June 2009 he signed a new two-year contract with the club. He was released in May 2010 after making a total of 297 appearances for the club.

=== AFC Wimbledon ===
In July 2010, Yakubu signed for Conference Premier side AFC Wimbledon. On 14 August 2010, Yakubu made his AFC Wimbledon debut in a 1–0 victory over Southport, featuring for the full 90 minutes. On 11 September 2010, Yakubu scored his first goal for the club, doubling AFC Wimbledon's lead in their 4–0 victory over Bath City. He played in the 2011 Conference Premier play-off final, coming off the bench and scoring a penalty in the penalty shoot-out.

After appearing in twenty-seven league games, Yakubu was released at the end of the season.

=== Newport County ===
On 24 May 2011, he was released by AFC Wimbledon and on 22 June joined Newport County. On 13 August 2011, Yakubu made his Newport County debut in their 3–2 defeat against Kettering Town, featuring for the entire 90 minutes.

On 26 September 2011, Yakubu joined fellow Conference Premier side Cambridge United on a one-month emergency loan deal. However, Yakubu returned to Newport without making a single appearance at Cambridge.

On 12 May 2012, Yakubu played for Newport County in the FA Trophy Final at Wembley Stadium which Newport lost 2–0 to York City. In the 2012–13 season he was part of the Newport team that finished 3rd in the league, reaching the Conference Premier play-offs. Newport County won the playoff final versus Wrexham at Wembley Stadium 2–0 to return to the Football League after a 25-year absence with promotion to Football League Two.

On 12 May 2015, it was announced that Yakubu would leave the club upon the expiry of his contract on 30 June.

=== Woking ===
Shortly after his release from Newport, Yakubu went on to sign a one-year contract with Woking for the 2015–2016 season.

Unfortunately his season only lasted six games after rupturing his anterior cruciate knee ligaments in a game against Boreham Wood On 18 May 2016, Yakubu signed a new one-year deal with Woking. Preceding the departure of Mark Ricketts, Yakubu was named captain for the 2016–17 campaign. Yakubu scored his first goal of the season, in Woking's 3–1 home defeat against Lincoln City, netting the Cards' equaliser just after the half-time break. On 23 May 2017, it was announced that Yakubu would leave Woking upon the expiry of his current deal in June 2017.

=== Hemel Hempstead Town ===
On 12 June 2017, it was announced that Yakubu would join National League South side Hemel Hempstead Town preceding his release from Woking.

=== Kingstonian ===
Yakubu signed for Kingstonian on 22 February 2019.

=== Hayes & Yeading United ===
Yakubu lined up for Hayes & Yeading United on the opening day of the 2019–20 season. In November 2019, he joined Merthyr Town on loan until the New Year. The loan was then extended until the end of the season. Yakubu became a fans favourite at The Martyrs after his impressive performances towards the end of the 2019/20 season.

=== Merthyr Town ===
Merthyr Town completed the signing of Yakubu ahead of the 2020/21 season, after his six-month loan from Hayes & Yeading United. He left the club when they suspended their participation from the Southern League before the start of the season.

=== Penybont ===
Yakubu signed for Cymru Premier side Penybont after his departure from Merthyr.

=== Return to Merthyr ===
Yakubu re-joined Merthyr for the 2021–22 season.

=== Cinderford Town ===
In November 2023, Yakubu joined Cinderford Town.

== Career statistics ==
As of match played 14 August 2021.

Appearances and goals by club, season and competition
Club	Season	League			FA Cup		League Cup		Other		Total	
Club	Season	Division	Apps	Goals	Apps	Goals	Apps	Goals	Apps	Goals	Apps	Goals
Barnet	2001–02	Football Conference	4	0	0	0	—		0	0	4	0
Barnet	2002–03	Football Conference	36	1	1	0	—		1 (Note: Appearance(s) in FA Trophy)	0	38	1
Barnet	2003–04	Conference National	39	2	4	0	—		2 (Note: Appearance(s) in Conference National play-offs)	0	45	2
Barnet	2004–05	Conference National	35	2	2	1	—		0	0	37	3
Barnet	2005–06	League Two	26	1	1	0	1	0	2 (Note: Appearance(s) in Football League Trophy)	0	30	1
Barnet	2006–07	League Two	29	1	4	1	1	0	2	0	36	2
Barnet	2007–08	League Two	28	2	6	1	0	0	0	0	34	3
Barnet	2008–09	League Two	38	3	2	1	1	0	0	0	41	4
Barnet	2009–10	League Two	25	2	3	1	1	0	2	1	31	4
Barnet	Total		260	14	23	5	4	0	9	1	296	20
AFC Wimbledon	2010–11	Conference Premier	27	2	4	0	—		4 (Note: One appearance in FA Trophy, three in Conference Premier play-offs)	0	35	2
Newport County	2011–12	Conference Premier	26	5	2	0	—		6	0	34	5
Newport County	2012–13	Conference Premier	36	5	0	0	—		4 (Note: One appearance in FA Trophy, three in Conference Premier play-offs)	0	40	5
Newport County	2013–14	League Two	25	3	2	0	1	0	2	0	30	3
Newport County	2014–15	League Two	33	2	1	0	1	0	0	0	35	2
Newport County	Total		120	15	5	0	2	0	12	0	139	15
Cambridge United (loan)	2011–12	Conference Premier	0	0	—		—		—		0	0
Woking	2015–16	National League	6	1	0	0	—		0	0	6	1
Woking	2016–17	National League	26	1	4	0	—		2	0	32	1
Woking	Total		32	2	4	0	—		2	0	38	2
Hemel Hempstead Town	2017–18	National League South	32	1	0	0	—		1 (Note: Appearance(s) in National League South play-offs)	0	33	1
Hemel Hempstead Town	2018–19	National League South	23	1	3	0	—		5	0	31	1
Hemel Hempstead Town	Total		55	2	3	0	—		6	0	64	2
Kingstonian	2018–19	Isthmian League Premier Division	11	0	0	0	—		0	0	11	0
Hayes & Yeading United	2019–20	SFL Premier Division South	10	0	4	0	—		1	0	15	0
Merthyr Town (loan)	2019–20	SFL Premier Division South	15	1	0	0	—		0	0	15	1
Penybont	2020–21	Cymru Premier	21	0	0	0	—		0	0	21	0
Merthyr Town	2021–22	SFL Premier Division South	4	1	0	0	—		0	0	30	4
Career total			555	37	43	5	6	0	34	1	638	43

== Honours ==
Barnet

- Conference National: 2004–05

AFC Wimbledon

- Conference Premier play-offs: 2010–11

Newport County

- FA Trophy runners-up 2011–12
- Conference Premier play-offs: 2012–13
