= Christian Jolley =

British footballer (born 1988)

Personal information
- Full name: Christian Anthony Hillard Jolley
- Date of birth: 12 May 1988 (age 38)
- Place of birth: Fleet, England
- Height: 6 ft 0 in (1.83 m)
- Position: Winger

Team information
- Current team: Hanworth Villa

Senior career*
Years	Team	Apps	(Gls)
2009	Oxted & District		
2009–2010	Kingstonian	32	(3)
2010–2013	AFC Wimbledon	84	(19)
2012	→ Newport County (loan)	4	(5)
2013–2015	Newport County	57	(10)
2014	→ Forest Green Rovers (loan)	7	(0)
2015	Grimsby Town	11	(1)
2015–2016	Margate	33	(2)
2016–2018	Hampton & Richmond Borough	66	(5)
2018–2019	Woking	19	(1)
2018	→ Leatherhead (dual-reg.)	2	(0)
2024–	Hanworth Villa	0	(0)

International career
2013	England C	1	(0)
- * Club domestic league appearances and goals as of 14:57, 3 June 2024 (UTC)

Christian Anthony Hillard Jolley (born 12 May 1988) is an English footballer who plays as a winger or a striker for Hanworth Villa.

He has previously played for Oxted & District, Warlingham, Kingstonian, AFC Wimbledon, Newport County, Forest Green Rovers, Grimsby Town, Margate, Hampton & Richmond Borough, Woking and Leatherhead.

== Playing career ==
Jolley began his career at Oxted and District while working at a local gym called Tandridge Trust, Leisure & Culture Limited (formerly Tandridge Leisure Limited). In September 2009, he was given a trial by Kingstonian which led to Jolley signing a contract with the club in December 2009. He immediately broke into a first team which narrowly missed out on promotion via the playoffs.

After impressing at Kingstonian, Jolley was signed by AFC Wimbledon in May 2010. He scored on his debut away against Southport on the first day of the 2010–11 season. He was an unused substitute for the team's play-off final victory over Luton Town that season, which won Wimbledon promotion to the Football League via a penalty shoot-out after a goalless 120 minutes, in which they returned to league football for the first time since Wimbledon F.C. split into AFC Wimbledon and MK Dons. On 3 July 2011, he signed a new contract. On 29 July, Jolley started for the Dons in their first ever League Cup match, producing an assist for Jack Midson.

On 15 November 2012, Jolley joined Conference National side Newport County on loan. He made his debut for the club on 18 November 2012, scoring Newport's only goal in a 3–1 home defeat by Hyde. After his prolific form, consisting of five league goals in only four league games, Jolley was recalled by AFC Wimbledon on 14 December 2012. However, on 11 January 2013 Jolley returned to Newport County on a permanent deal for an undisclosed fee. In the 2012–13 season he was part of the Newport team that finished third in the league, reaching the Conference National playoffs. Newport County won the playoff final versus Wrexham at Wembley Stadium 2–0 to return to the Football League after a 25-year absence with promotion to Football League Two. Jolley scored the first goal. In June 2013, Jolley was named in the 2012–13 Conference Premier team of the year

On 25 September 2014, Jolley joined Forest Green Rovers on a one-month loan. He made his Forest Green debut on 27 September 2014, playing 69 minutes in a 2–1 home defeat against Barnet. On 24 October 2014, it was confirmed that his loan spell with Forest Green had been extended by a further month. Having made seven league appearances, his loan spell with the club came to an end on 22 November 2014 after Forest Green boss Adrian Pennock confirmed he would be returning to Newport County. On 21 January 2015, having made only 5 league appearances in the 2014–15 season, Jolley's contract with Newport County was terminated by mutual consent.

On 26 January 2015, Jolley signed for Conference Premier side Grimsby Town until the end of the season.

On 27 June 2015, Jolley signed for National League South side Margate. After just one campaign in Kent, Jolley opted to reunite with former Kingstonian manager, Alan Dowson at Hampton & Richmond Borough in July 2016. In his two years at the club, Jolley featured over seventy times, before making the move to fellow National League South side, Woking, along with manager, Dowson. On the opening day of the campaign, he went onto make his Cards debut during their 1–0 away victory over East Thurrock United. After only featuring in just three league fixtures, Jolley sustained a long-term ankle injury later that month, which subsequently, ruled him out for three months. In order to gain match fitness, Jolley joined Surrey-based side, Leatherhead on a dual-registration basis and went onto feature twice before returning to the Woking starting XI in their FA Cup second round tie against Swindon Town. On 16 March 2019, Jolley scored his first goal for the club during a 3–3 draw with fellow promotion hopefuls, Welling United. Proceeding the conclusion of the 2018–19 campaign, Jolley announced his retirement from football, with a view to a coaching role at the club under Dowson.

On 31 May 2024, Jolley came out of retirement to join Isthmian League South Central club Hanworth Villa.

== Coaching career ==
On 20 June 2022, it was confirmed that Jolley would become assistant manager at Dartford, where he'd work under Dowson.

== International career ==
Jolley made his debut for the England C team on 5 February 2013 as a second-half substitute in the 1–0 defeat against Turkey Under-23s.

== Personal life ==
Following his retirement Jolley became the founder of Make Movements, a mobile massage and movement therapy business based in Surrey and London.

== Career statistics ==
As of match played 22 April 2019.

Appearances and goals by club, season and competition
Club	Season	League			FA Cup		League Cup		Other		Total	
Club	Season	Division	Apps	Goals	Apps	Goals	Apps	Goals	Apps	Goals	Apps	Goals
Kingstonian	2009–10	Isthmian League Premier Division	32	3	—		—		—		32	3
AFC Wimbledon	2010–11	Conference Premier	32	12	3	0	—		4 (Note: Two appearances and one goal in FA Trophy, two appearances and one goal in Conference Premier play-offs)	2	39	14
AFC Wimbledon	2011–12	League Two	37	7	2	0	1	0	1 (Note: Appearance(s) in Football League Trophy)	0	41	7
AFC Wimbledon	2012–13	League Two	15	0	2	0	1	0	1	0	19	0
AFC Wimbledon	Total		84	19	7	0	2	0	6	2	99	21
Newport County (loan)	2012–13	Conference Premier	4	5	—		—		1 (Note: Appearance(s) in FA Trophy)	0	5	5
Newport County	2012–13	Conference Premier	20	8	—		—		3 (Note: Appearance(s) in Conference Premier play-offs)	2	23	10
Newport County	2013–14	League Two	32	2	3	0	1	0	2	0	38	2
Newport County	2014–15	League Two	5	0	0	0	1	0	1	0	7	0
Newport County	Total		57	10	3	0	2	0	6	2	68	12
Forest Green Rovers (loan)	2014–15	Conference Premier	7	0	2	0	—		0	0	9	0
Grimsby Town	2014–15	Conference Premier	11	1	—		—		0	0	11	1
Margate	2015–16	National League South	33	2	1	0	—		1	0	35	2
Hampton & Richmond Borough	2016–17	National League South	35	4	0	0	—		2 (Note: Appearance(s) in National League South play-offs)	0	37	4
Hampton & Richmond Borough	2017–18	National League South	31	1	4	0	—		3	0	38	1
Hampton & Richmond Borough	Total		66	5	4	0	—		5	0	75	5
Woking	2018–19	National League South	19	1	2	0	—		2	0	23	1
Leatherhead (dual-reg.)	2018–19	Isthmian League Premier Division	2	0	—		—		—		2	0
Career total			315	46	19	0	4	0	21	4	359	50

== Honours ==
=== Club ===
AFC Wimbledon

- Conference Premier play-offs: 2010–11

Newport County

- Conference Premier play-offs: 2012–13

Woking

- National League South play-offs: 2018–19

Individual

- Conference Premier Team of the Year: 2012–13
