= Jefferson Louis =

Association football player (born 1979)

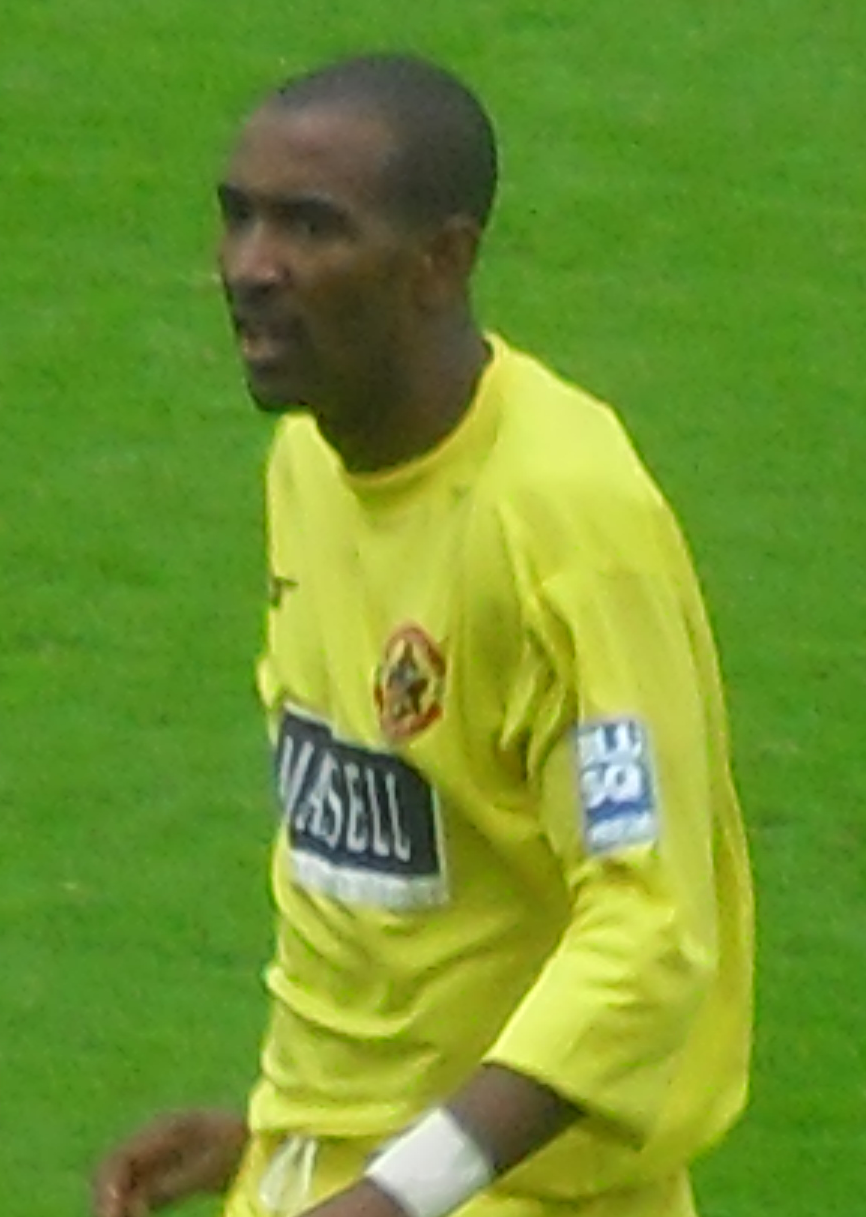
- Louis playing for Crawley Town in 2009

Personal information
- Full name: Jefferson Lee Louis
- Date of birth: 22 February 1979 (age 47)
- Place of birth: Harrow, London, England
- Position: Striker

Team information
- Current team: Slough Town (assistant first-team coach)

Senior career*
Years	Team	Apps	(Gls)
1996–1998	Risborough Rangers	49	(19)
1998–2000	Thame United		
2000–2001	Aylesbury United	14	(5)
2001–2002	Thame United		
2002–2004	Oxford United	56	(8)
2003	→ Woking (loan)	8	(5)
2004	→ Gravesend & Northfleet (loan)	5	(2)
2004	Forest Green Rovers	10	(2)
2004–2005	Woking	26	(4)
2005	Bristol Rovers	9	(0)
2005	Hemel Hempstead Town	1	(1)
2005	Worthing	6	(2)
2005	Lewes	2	(0)
2005–2006	Stevenage Borough	18	(6)
2006	Eastleigh	6	(1)
2006–2007	Yeading	8	(4)
2007	Havant & Waterlooville	20	(5)
2007–2008	Weymouth	21	(7)
2008	Maidenhead United	3	(0)
2008	Mansfield Town	18	(4)
2008–2009	Wrexham	42	(15)
2009–2010	Crawley Town	18	(5)
2009–2010	→ Rushden & Diamonds (loan)	26	(7)
2010–2011	Gainsborough Trinity	9	(1)
2010–2011	→ Darlington (loan)	6	(0)
2011	Weymouth	1	(0)
2011	Hayes & Yeading United	10	(1)
2011	Maidenhead United	12	(3)
2011–2012	Brackley Town	26	(14)
2012	Lincoln City	14	(6)
2012	Newport County	17	(2)
2012	→ Whitehawk (loan)	6	(4)
2013	Brackley Town	24	(7)
2013–2014	Hendon	25	(22)
2014	Margate	17	(9)
2014	Lowestoft Town	16	(4)
2014–2016	Wealdstone	58	(23)
2016	Staines Town	10	(3)
2016–2017	Oxford City	29	(8)
2017	Banbury United	21	(13)
2017–2018	Chesham United	24	(8)
2018	Farnborough	6	(2)
2018–2019	Chesham United	45	(12)
2019	Hampton & Richmond Borough	6	(1)
2019–2020	St Albans City	12	(2)
2020–2021	Beaconsfield Town	16	(1)
2021–2022	North Leigh	22	(7)
2022	Risborough Rangers	10	(1)
2022–2023	Thame United	24	(9)
2023	Slough Town	4	(0)
2023–2024	Beaconsfield Town	15	(4)
2024–2025	Thame United	55	(9)
Total		906+	(278+)

International career
2008	Dominica	1	(0)
- * Club domestic league appearances and goals as of 10:21, 4 June 2025 (UTC)

Jefferson Lee Louis (born 22 February 1979) is a former footballer who played as a striker. He is assistant first-team coach at Slough Town.

A journeyman, he has featured for 42 different clubs (51 moves) in almost a 30-year career. In addition, he appeared for 7 clubs in a year, which may be a record.

Louis has played in the English Football League for Oxford United, Bristol Rovers and Mansfield Town, and is a former Dominica international.

He is also one of the few footballers to have made over 1,000 competitive appearances, with at least 1,037 appearances (the first Dominican to achieve the feat, since the time matches are recorded).

== Early life ==
Louis was born in Harrow, and raised in Harlesden, London. He and his mother moved to Aylesbury, Buckinghamshire, when he was 17. He played football for local clubs Risborough Rangers, Aylesbury United and Thame United before, in 2001, he was convicted of dangerous driving while disqualified and sentenced to a year's imprisonment. He served six months before being released from Woodhill Prison.

== Club career ==
Louis joined Oxford United on an initial trial basis in February 2002 and impressed suitably to be handed a Football League debut, as a 78th-minute substitute for Dave Savage, in the club's final game of the season: a 2–1 home defeat to Darlington on 20 April 2002. Retained by the club, the following season he attracted much media attention when, having scored the winner in Oxford United's televised FA Cup Second Round clash with Swindon Town, he was captured naked live on television joyously celebrating the U's draw with the club, Arsenal, he supported as a boy. The club would go on to lose the tie, at Highbury, 2–0 with Louis appearing as a 54th-minute substitute. Despite the attention, his manager Ian Atkins felt that he failed to progress in the second half of the season and he was transfer listed at the season's end.

On 31 July 2003 he agreed to join Woking on loan, the deal seeing him sign for one month with immediate recall, then two further months with the option of making the move permanent. He was recalled from the loan on 15 September 2003, and earned a recall to the first team. On 27 August 2004 he joined Gravesend & Northfleet on a month's loan, before being recalled from his loan period on 24 September 2004 to enable him to sign for Forest Green Rovers on a free transfer.

Louis left Forest Green Rovers for Woking on 3 December 2004, the latter paying a nominal fee for his services. He remained at Woking until the end of the 2004–05 season, scoring 3 times in 23 league matches. He made 10 league and cup appearances for Second Division side Bristol Rovers between May and September 2005. After brief spells at Worthing and Stevenage Borough, he signed for Yeading in January 2006. He remained with the club until January 2007 but played only a handful of matches for the club. Louis then spent six months at Havant & Waterlooville and another six months at Weymouth.

Louis spent a brief spell with Maidenhead United before joining Mansfield Town in January 2008 on a three-month contract. He was released on 2 May 2008 and joined Wrexham the following month. His spell at Wrexham was a successful one, scoring 15 goals in 42 appearances in the 2008–09 season. After having his contract with Wrexham terminated by mutual consent, he joined Crawley Town on 24 May 2009. He joined Rushden & Diamonds on loan on 12 November. However, he limped off on his debut after 17 minutes. He did well at Nene Park, and in the last game of his original loan deal he scored twice against Barrow, prompting manager Justin Edinburgh to keep him till the end of the season.

He joined Gainsborough Trinity in June 2010, but in October moved on to Conference National club Darlington on loan until January 2011, with the intention of the deal then being made permanent. The deal fell through, so Louis returned to Gainsborough at the end of the loan. Released by Gainsborough, he played once for former club Weymouth, as a substitute in a 2–1 win at Hemel Hempstead Town, then returned to the Conference with Hayes & Yeading United. Released by Hayes & Yeading at his own request in March, he rejoined Maidenhead United the following day.

After spending the first half of the 2011–12 season with Brackley Town, Louis joined Lincoln City on 31 January 2012. In June 2012 he agreed a deal to rejoin his former Rushden & Diamonds manager Justin Edinburgh at Newport County. In November 2012 he joined Whitehawk on loan until his contract with Newport County expired on 1 January 2013. He then returned to Brackley Town, making his second debut at the turn of the year against Droylsden on 5 January 2013. By the end of the season he had scored 7 goals in 24 Conference North appearances, including the play-offs. He left Brackley at the end of the season and signed for Hendon in July 2013. In February 2014, Louis joined Margate, before later playing for Lowestoft Town, his 30th team.

Louis' next club was Wealdstone, whom he joined in December 2014. He scored 18 goals for the club in 57 league matches. On 3 June 2016, Staines Town announced that Louis had put pen to paper for them. On 13 October 2016, Oxford City manager Justin Merritt completed the signing of Louis. Caretaker boss since December, Mark Jones, released Louis at the end of the season after being appointed the permanent manager, and he subsequently joined local rivals Banbury United. During his time at United Louis became the first ever Banbury player to score 6 league goals in his first 6 games, breaking a 50-year-old record previously held by United's all-time top goalscorer Tony Jacques.

In December 2017 he moved to fellow Southern League Premier Division side Chesham United. He switched to Farnborough of the newly formed Southern Football League Premier South ahead of the 2018–19 season. On 15 September 2018 he returned to league rivals Chesham United for the 7th round of the season, as they were struggling at the bottom of the table. On 24 December 2019 he joined St Albans City. In the summer of 2020 he joined Southern Premier Division side Beaconsfield Town. In October 2021, he transferred to North Leigh.

On 13 June 2023, Louis joined National League South side Slough Town as player-coach.

In October 2023, Louis rejoined Beaconsfield Town, moving again in January 2024 for another stint with Thame United.

On 4 June 2025, Louis announced his retirement from playing aged 46.

== Coaching career ==
On 4 June 2025, Louis returned to Slough Town as assistant first-team coach.

== Career statistics ==
Appearances and goals by club, season and competition
Club	Season	League			National Cup		League Cup		Other		Total	
Club	Season	Division	Apps	Goals	Apps	Goals	Apps	Goals	Apps	Goals	Apps	Goals
Thame United	1999–2000	IL Division One							1	0	1+	0+
Aylesbury United	2000–01	IL Division One	14	5	1	0	0	0	0	0	15	5
Oxford United	2001–02	Third Division	1	0	0	0	0	0	0	0	1	0
Oxford United	2002–03	Third Division	34	6	5	1	2	0	1	0	42	7
Oxford United	2003–04	Third Division	20	2	2	1	1	1	1	0	24	4
→ Woking (loan)	2003–04	Conference	8	5	1	0	0	0	0	0	9	5
Oxford United	2004–05	League Two	1	0	0	0	0	0	0	0	1	0
→ Gravesend & Northfleet (loan)	2004–05	Conference	5	2	0	0	0	0	0	0	5	2
Forest Green Rovers	2004–05	Conference	10	2	2	1	0	0	0	0	12	3
Woking	2004–05	Conference	26	4	0	0	0	0	2	1	28	5
Bristol Rovers	2004–05	League Two	1	0	0	0	0	0	0	0	1	0
Bristol Rovers	2005–06	League Two	8	0	0	0	1	0	0	0	9	0
Hemel Hempstead Town	2005–06	SL Division One West	1	1	0	0	0	0	0	0	1	1
Worthing	2005–06	IL Premier Division	6	2	0	0	0	0	0	0	6	2
Lewes	2005–06	Conference South	2	0	0	0	0	0	0	0	2	0
Stevenage Borough	2005–06	Conference Premier	18	6	0	0	0	0	0	0	18	6
Eastleigh	2006–07	Conference South	6	1	0	0	0	0	0	0	6	1
Yeading	2006–07	Conference South	8	4	1	0	0	0	0	0	9	4
Havant & Waterlooville	2006–07	Conference South	20	5	0	0	0	0	0	0	20	5
Weymouth	2007–08	Conference Premier	21	7	3	1	0	0	2	2	26	10
Maidenhead United	2007–08	Conference South	3	0	0	0	0	0	0	0	3	0
Mansfield Town	2007–08	League Two	18	4	0	0	0	0	1	0	19	4
Wrexham	2008–09	Conference Premier	42	15	4	2	0	0	3	1	49	18
Crawley Town	2009–10	Conference Premier	18	5	1	1	0	0	0	0	19	6
Rushden & Diamonds (loan)	2009–10	Conference Premier	26	7	2	0	0	0	4	0	32	7
Gainsborough Trinity	2010–11	Conference North	9	1	0	0	0	0	0	0	9	1
Darlington (loan)	2010–11	Conference Premier	6	0	0	0	0	0	1	0	7	0
Weymouth	2010–11	SL Premier Division	1	0	0	0	0	0	0	0	1	0
Hayes & Yeading United	2010–11	Conference Premier	10	1							11	3
Maidenhead United	2010–11	Conference South	12	3	0	0	0	0	1	0	13	3
Brackley Town	2011–12	SL Premier Division	26	14	1	0	0	0	0	0	27	14
Lincoln City	2011–12	Conference Premier	14	6	0	0	0	0	0	0	14	6
Newport County	2012–13	Conference Premier	17	2	0	0	0	0	0	0	17	2
Whitehawk (loan)	2012–13	IL Premier Division	6	4	0	0	0	0	1	0	7	4
Brackley Town	2012–13	Conference North	24	7	0	0	0	0	3	2	27	9
Hendon	2013–14	IL Premier Division	25	22	1	1	0	0	8	4	34	27
Margate	2013–14	IL Premier Division	17	9	0	0	0	0	0	0	17	9
Lowestoft Town	2014–15	Conference North	16	4	0	0	0	0	5	3	21	7
Wealdstone	2014–15	Conference South	19	10	0	0	0	0	1	1	20	11
Wealdstone	2015–16	National League South	39	13	4	3	0	0	4	3	47	19
Staines Town	2016–17	IL Premier Division	10	3	0	0	0	0	0	0	10	3
Oxford City	2016–17	National League South	29	8	3	0	0	0	0	0	32	8
Banbury United	2017–18	SL Premier Division	21	13	3	1	0	0	3	3	27	17
Chesham United	2017–18	SL Premier Division	24	8	3	1	0	0	0	0	27	9
Farnborough	2018–19	SL Premier Division South	6	2	0	0	0	0	1	0	7	2
Chesham United	2018–19	SL Premier Division South	40	12	1	1	0	0	4	0	45	13
Chesham United	2019–20	SL Premier Division South	5	0	1	0	0	0	0	0	6	0
Hampton & Richmond Borough	2019–20	National League South	6	1	0	0	0	0	2	0	8	1
St Albans City	2019–20	National League South	12	2	0	0	0	0	2	0	14	2
Beaconsfield Town	2020–21	SL Premier Division South	7	1	1	0	0	0	1	0	9	1
Beaconsfield Town	2021–22	SL Premier Division South	9	0	1	0	0	0	2	2	12	2
North Leigh	2021–22	SL Division One Central	22	7	0	0	0	0	4	3	26	10
Risborough Rangers	2022–23	SSML Premier Division	10	1	1	0	0	0	4	1	15	2
Thame United	2022–23	IL Division One Central	24	9	0	0	0	0	2	2	26	11
Slough Town	2022–23	National League South	2	0	1	0	0	0	1	0	4	0
Slough Town	2023–24	National League South	2	0	0	0	0	0	0	0	2	0
Beaconsfield Town	2023–24	SL Premier Division South	15	4	0	0	0	0	4	4	19	8
Thame United	2023–24	SL Division One Central	16	4	0	0	0	0	3	0	19	4
Thame United	2024–25	SL Division One Central	39	5	3	1	0	0	7	3	49	9
Career total			906+ (Note: Jefferson Louis, additionally, played 49 league matches for Risborough Rangers in 1996–1998 and scored 19 goals in them, numbers that are included in the totals.)	278+	46+	15+	4+	1+	79+	35+	1,036+	331+

== International career ==
Louis represented Dominica in a 2010 World Cup qualifier against Barbados in March 2008, which Dominica lost 1–0. Louis played up front with his cousin Richard Pacquette in this match.

== See also ==
- List of men's footballers with 1,000 or more official appearances
