= Danny Crow =

English footballer

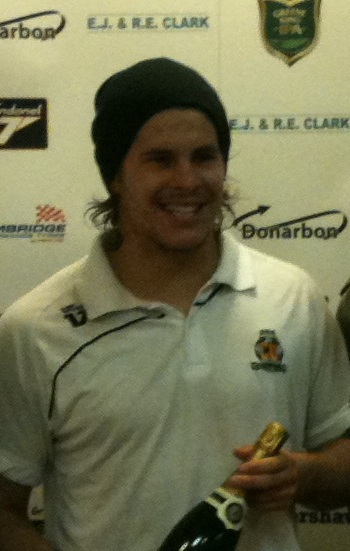
- Crow in 2009

Personal information
- Full name: Daniel Stephen Crow
- Date of birth: 26 January 1986 (age 40)
- Place of birth: Great Yarmouth, England
- Height: 1.75 m (5 ft 9 in)
- Position: Forward

Team information
- Current team: Cambridge City (assistant manager)

Youth career
- 1994–2004: Norwich City

Senior career*
Years	Team	Apps	(Gls)
2004–2005	Norwich City	4	(0)
2005	→ Northampton Town (loan)	10	(2)
2005–2008	Peterborough United	77	(23)
2007	→ Notts County (loan)	1	(0)
2008	→ Notts County (loan)	13	(2)
2008–2010	Cambridge United	61	(22)
2010–2012	Luton Town	57	(16)
2012–2015	Newport County	54	(6)
2015–2016	Lowestoft Town	41	(9)
2017	Sudbury	16	(3)
Total		334	(83)

Managerial career
- 2022–2024: Harleston Town
- 2024-2025: Wroxham F.C.
- 2025-current: Cambridge City
- * Club domestic league appearances and goals

Daniel Stephen Crow (born 26 January 1986) is an English former footballer who played as a striker.

== Career ==
Crow made his senior debut as a substitute for Norwich City in a Premier League match against Middlesbrough on 28 December 2004. He was loaned to Northampton Town towards the end of the 2004–05 season, where he scored two goals in ten games, and released by Norwich that summer.

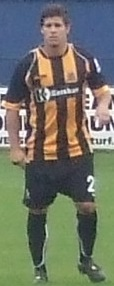
Crow playing for Cambridge United in 2008

He signed for League Two side Peterborough United at the start of the 2005–06 season, becoming the club's top goalscorer with 17 goals. The next season was less successful, with Crow scoring 10 goals in 42 games. During the campaign, Crow featured on the Sky One documentary Big Ron Manager, and was criticised for his poor attitude and for being overweight. Reflecting on the documentary in 2020, Crow said: "I was portrayed badly by the programme and I believe that it affected my career. It harmed my chances of progressing."

On 9 October 2007 he signed an initial one-month loan deal at Notts County. However, during his first game for "The Magpies" he suffered a broken fifth metatarsal, and was sent back to Peterborough. He rejoined Notts County in February 2008, scoring against Chester City in his first game back at the club. He went on to make twelve further appearances, scoring once more, as Notts County avoided relegation from The Football League.

After being told by then-Peterborough manager Darren Ferguson that he was "surplus to requirements", Crow had his contract terminated by mutual consent on 1 September 2008. Ten days later, Crow agreed to join Peterborough's local rivals Cambridge United on a free transfer move that took him to the Abbey Stadium on a contract until May 2010.

His first season at Cambridge proved to be ultimately unsuccessful, scoring only three goals as the club lost in the play-off final at Wembley Stadium. The next season saw Crow flourish under new manager Martin Ling, even though Cambridge finished in mid-table. Crow was named Cambridge United Player of the Year for the 2009–10 season, having finished the campaign as top scorer with 19 goals. The decision was made via an online vote on the club's official website, where he gained 85.3% of the votes.

On 21 May 2010, with his Cambridge contract having expired, Crow signed for Luton Town, joining up with former Cambridge teammate Dan Gleeson. Crow scored his first goal for the club on 28 September 2010 against Mansfield Town, despite missing a penalty earlier in the game. He then went on to score four goals in four days in mid-October; two against Eastbourne Borough and two more against Forest Green Rovers. Two further goals later in the month against St Albans City in the FA Cup and Bath City in the league led to Crow being named Conference Premier Player of the Month for October.

After two injury-interrupted seasons, playing in 68 games and scoring 17 goals, Crow was released by Luton in May 2012 after his contract expired.

In June 2012 Crow signed for Newport County, signing a one-year contract. In the 2012–13 season he was part of the Newport team that finished third in the league, reaching the Conference Premier play-offs. Newport County won the playoff final versus Wrexham at Wembley Stadium 2–0 to return to the Football League after a 25-year absence with promotion to Football League Two. Crow scored the first two goals in the League Cup first round at Brighton on 6 August 2013 in Newport's 3–1 win.

He was released by Newport county on 15 January 2015 and on the same day signed a contract with Lowestoft Town. Whilst playing he also began coaching the club's Conference Youth Alliance team. However, his contract was terminated in 2016.

On 10 January 2017, he signed for Isthmian League side AFC Sudbury, where he made his debut from the bench in a 3–0 win over Metropolitan Police.

== Coaching career ==
Crow holds a UEFA A coaching licence. He started his coaching career with Lowestoft where he worked as a player/coach. However, he was sacked in November 2016 due to a serious breach of contract involving recruiting players from Lowestoft's academy and reserve team to join his company Road2Pro. Crow appealed the decision to the Ryman League and The FA but was unsuccessful.

On 14 May 2022, it was announced that he had been appointed manager of Harleston Town. Prior to his appointment, Crow had been working as a scout at Leyton Orient. Crow left Harleston on 27 October 2024.

On 9 December 2024, Crow joined Isthmian League North side Wroxham as assistant manager.

== Honours ==
Individual

- Conference Premier Player of the Month: October 2010
