= 2013 Conference Premier play-off final =

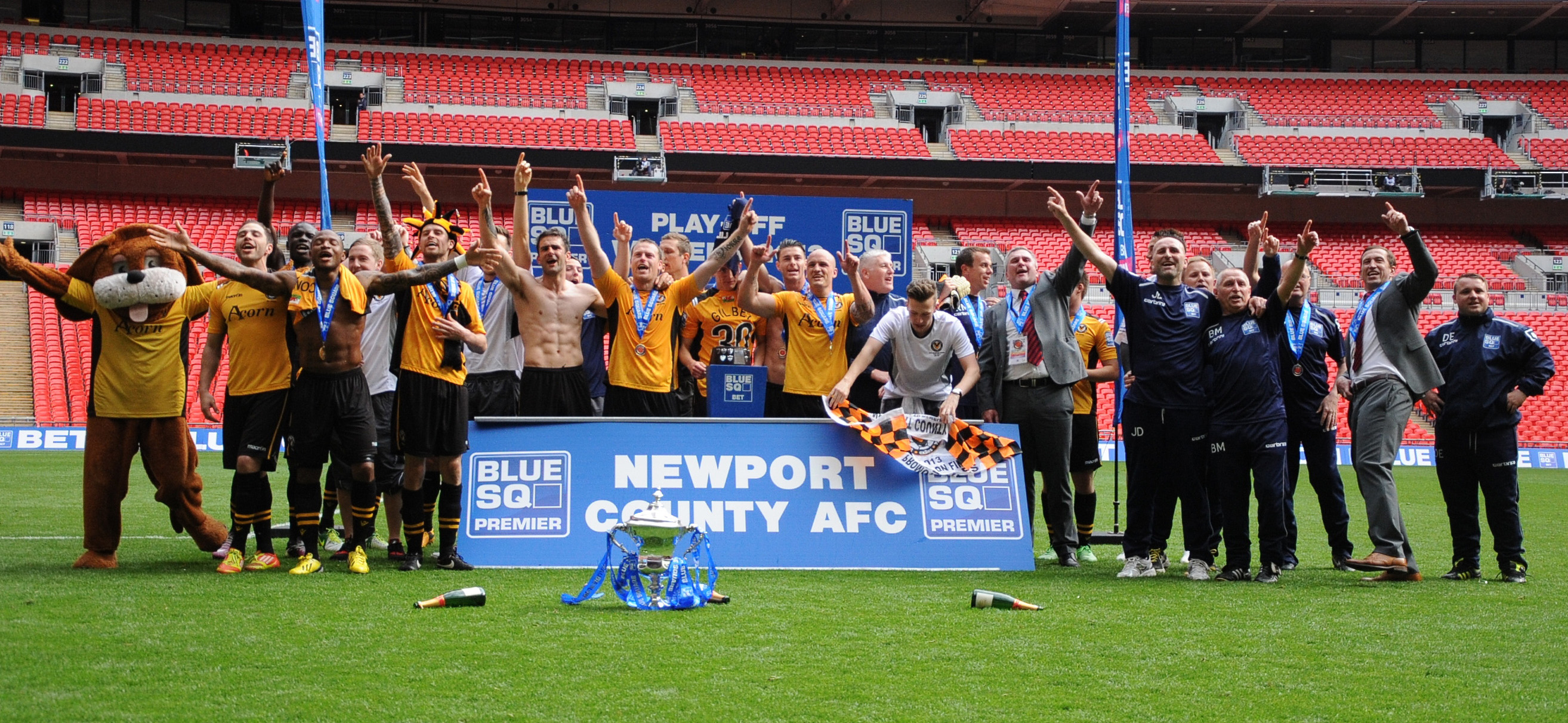
- Newport County lift the Conference Premier play-off winners' trophy
- Event: 2012–13 Football Conference
Wrexham	Newport County
0	2
- Date: 5 May 2013
- Venue: Wembley Stadium, London
- Man of the Match: Christian Jolley (Newport County)
- Referee: Michael Bull
- Attendance: 16,346

The 2013 Conference Premier play-off final, known as the 2013 Blue Square Bet Premier play-off final for sponsorship purposes, was a football match between Wrexham and Newport County on 5 May 2013 at Wembley Stadium in London. It was the eleventh Conference Premier play-off final and the first ever Wembley Final to feature two teams from Wales.

After not having played in Wembley for 149 years the match represented the second time in the 2012–13 season for Wrexham who reached the final with a 5–2 aggregate win over Kidderminster Harriers following their appearance in the 2013 FA Trophy Final. The final also represented Newport County's second trip to Wembley in less than a year having played in the 2012 FA Trophy Final. Newport had beaten Grimsby Town 2–0 over two legs to reach the play-off final.

Newport County won the match 2–0 to secure promotion to League Two, re-entering the Football League after a 25-year absence. It was the first time in Conference history that a team had not conceded a single goal in the play-offs.

Whereas the players in the Wrexham team were new to the play-off final, the County team had seven players with previous play-off final experience: Alan Julian had featured for Stevenage Borough in the 2005 final. It was the second successive final for Aaron O'Connor who had featured for Luton Town in the 2012 final. Danny Crow had featured in both the 2009 final for Cambridge United and the 2011 final for Luton Town. It was the fourth final for Robbie Willmott who had featured for Cambridge United in 2009 and Luton Town in the 2011 and 2012 finals. Winning the final for a second time were Ismail Yakubu, Lee Minshull and Christian Jolley who were all part of the victorious Wimbledon team in the 2011 final.

The sides' next meeting in a league fixture would not come until the 2023–24 EFL League Two season. With Wrexham taking a 2–0 win at the Stōk Cae Râs and Newport County taking a 1–0 win at Rodney Parade.

== Match ==
=== Summary ===
Both teams started the game nervously with Wrexham having the better of the opening exchanges. On 15 minutes Brett Ormerod saw an effort at goal dragged wide of the near post. A cross from Johnny Hunt in the 21st minute was met by Ormerod but his shot went over the bar. Towards the end of the first half Newport gained momentum with Christian Jolley's curled shot just wide of goal. The score remained 0–0 at half time.

In the second half Wrexham stepped up their game and nearly took the lead in the 59th minute when an initial shot from Andy Morrell was palmed by Lenny Pidgeley into the path of Ormerod who blasted over from six yards. Shortly afterwards Newport's Danny Crow was replaced with their leading goalscorer Aaron O'Connor. Wrexham's player-manager Morrell then replaced himself with Adrian Cieślewicz. As the game wore on both teams made further substitutions with Newport's Michael Flynn making way for Scott Donnelly in the 74th minute and Wrexham's Glen Little coming on for captain Dean Keates in the 80th minute.

As the game looked certain to go into extra time Jolley headed a warning shot just wide of goal in the 83rd minute. Wrexham failed to heed the warning and in the 86th minute a long up-field pass from Andy Sandell was headed backwards by Wrexham's David Artell into the path of Jolley who made no mistake in lifting it over the on-rushing Chris Maxwell and into the goal.

Wrexham replaced Jay Harris with Dele Adebola in the 89th minute and pushed every player up front, including goalkeeper Maxwell. They managed to force a number of corners in injury time but were caught on the break by Jolley who fed O'Connor. His initial left-footed shot was saved but he made no mistake with his right-footed follow-up to make the score 2–0 to County in the 4th minute of injury time. Two minutes later and the game was over.

=== Details ===
5 May 2013
15:00 BST

Wrexham	0–2	Newport County
	Report; Report; Report; Report; Report; Report	Jolley 86'; O'Connor 90+4'

Wembley Stadium, London
Attendance: 16,346
Referee: Michael Bull

Wrexham	Newport County

GK	24	Chris Maxwell
RB	2	Stephen Wright
CB	32	David Artell
CB	6	Martin Riley
LB	3	Neil Ashton
RM	8	Jay Harris		(substituted off) 89'
CM	12	Dean Keates (C)		(substituted off) 80'
CM	14	Joe Clarke
LM	16	Johnny Hunt
CF	10	Brett Ormerod	(yellow card) 64'
CF	11	Andy Morrell		(substituted off) 69'
Substitutes:
GK	13	Andy Coughlin
DF	23	Chris Westwood
MF	17	Glen Little		(substituted on) 80'
FW	7	Adrian Cieślewicz		(substituted on) 69'
FW	31	Dele Adebola		(substituted on) 89'
Manager:
Andy Morrell

GK	40	Lenny Pidgeley
CB	5	Tony James
CB	6	Ismail Yakubu
CB	21	Byron Anthony
RM	2	David Pipe (C)
CM	8	Lee Minshull
CM	30	Alex Gilbey	(yellow card) 79'
CM	17	Michael Flynn		(substituted off) 74'
LM	13	Andy Sandell
CF	23	Christian Jolley
CF	9	Danny Crow		(substituted off) 63'
Substitutes:
GK	1	Alan Julian
DF	3	Andrew Hughes
MF	26	Scott Donnelly		(substituted on) 74'
FW	7	Aaron O'Connor		(substituted on) 63'
FW	24	Robbie Willmott
Manager:
Justin Edinburgh

Match rules:

- 90 minutes.
- 30 minutes of extra time if necessary.
- Penalty shoot-out if scores still level.
- Five named substitutes
- Maximum of three substitutions.
