= Andy Coughlin =

English footballer

Personal information
- Date of birth: 13 January 1993 (age 33)
- Place of birth: Bootle, England
- Position: Goalkeeper

Youth career
- 2008–2011: Tranmere Rovers

Senior career*
Years	Team	Apps	(Gls)
2010–2012	Tranmere Rovers	2	(0)
2010	→ Fleetwood Town (loan)	0	(0)
2012–2015	Wrexham	62	(0)
2015–2016	Southport	14	(0)
2016–2017	Barrow	2	(0)
2017–2018	Airbus UK	20	(0)
2018	Bangor City	0	(0)
2018–2022	Colwyn Bay		
2022–2023	Runcorn Linnets		
2023	Bootle		

International career
2014–2015	England C	4	(0)
- * Club domestic league appearances and goals as of 18:47, 23 May 2018 (UTC)

Andrew Coughlin (born 31 January 1993) is an English footballer who plays as a goalkeeper.

== Career ==
=== Tranmere Rovers ===
Coughlin was born in Bootle, England. He started his career in the Centre of Excellence of Tranmere Rovers at the age of 15 and signed a two-year apprenticeship in the summer of 2009. In April 2010, Coughlin was an unused substitute for the 3–1 win over Exeter City. In April 2011, Coughlin signed his first professional contract, on a one-year deal. On 21 April 2012, Coughlin made his professional debut in a 1–1 draw with Hartlepool United. He was released at the end of the 2011–12 season.

=== Fleetwood Town (loan) ===
In November 2010, he was sent on loan to Conference side Fleetwood Town on work experience terms. Coughlin was signed to act as back up to Scott Davies whilst regular second choice goalkeeper Danny Hurst was out injured. In his loan spell Coughlin did not make an appearance for the Highbury club.

=== Wrexham ===
On 3 July 2012, he joined Welsh club Wrexham on trial, before signing a one-year deal on 23 July. Coughlin was involved in pre-season matches against Welsh Premier side's Aberystwyth Town and Bala Town as well as Kilmarnock and Coventry City. Coughlin made his debut for Wrexham in a 3–2 win against Stockport County at Edgeley Park on 10 October, this was due to first choice 'keeper Joslain Mayebi being away on international duty with Cameroon. Coughlin played his first home league match in a 4–2 defeat to Lincoln City at the Racecourse Ground. After a season as second choice and making just eight appearances, Coughlin extended his deal in the summer of 2013 meaning his contract would end at the end of the 2013/2014 season. In a season where he looked to challenge first team goalkeeper Joslain Mayebi, it took just two months, as a string of Mayebi mistakes handed Coughlin the number one spot, which he kept and played well, earning the praises of the Wrexham fans throughout the season.

He subsequently joined Southport for the 2015–2016 season, before spending the 2016–17 season with Barrow.

=== Airbus UK Broughton ===
In the summer of 2017, Coughlin signed for Airbus UK Broughton in the Huws Gray Alliance, making twenty league appearances in his only season. In July 2018, Coughlin moved on to recently relegated Bangor City, before moving on to Colwyn Bay that September. He stayed at the club until May 2022.

== International career ==
Coughlin was called up to the England C team in February 2014 by England C and Chester manager Steve Burr. He made his debut against Jordan U23s on 4 March 2014, winning 1–0 and Coughlin keeping a clean sheet.

== Honours ==
Wrexham

- FA Trophy: 2012–13; runner-up: 2014–15
