= Justin Edinburgh =

English association football player and manager (1969–2019)

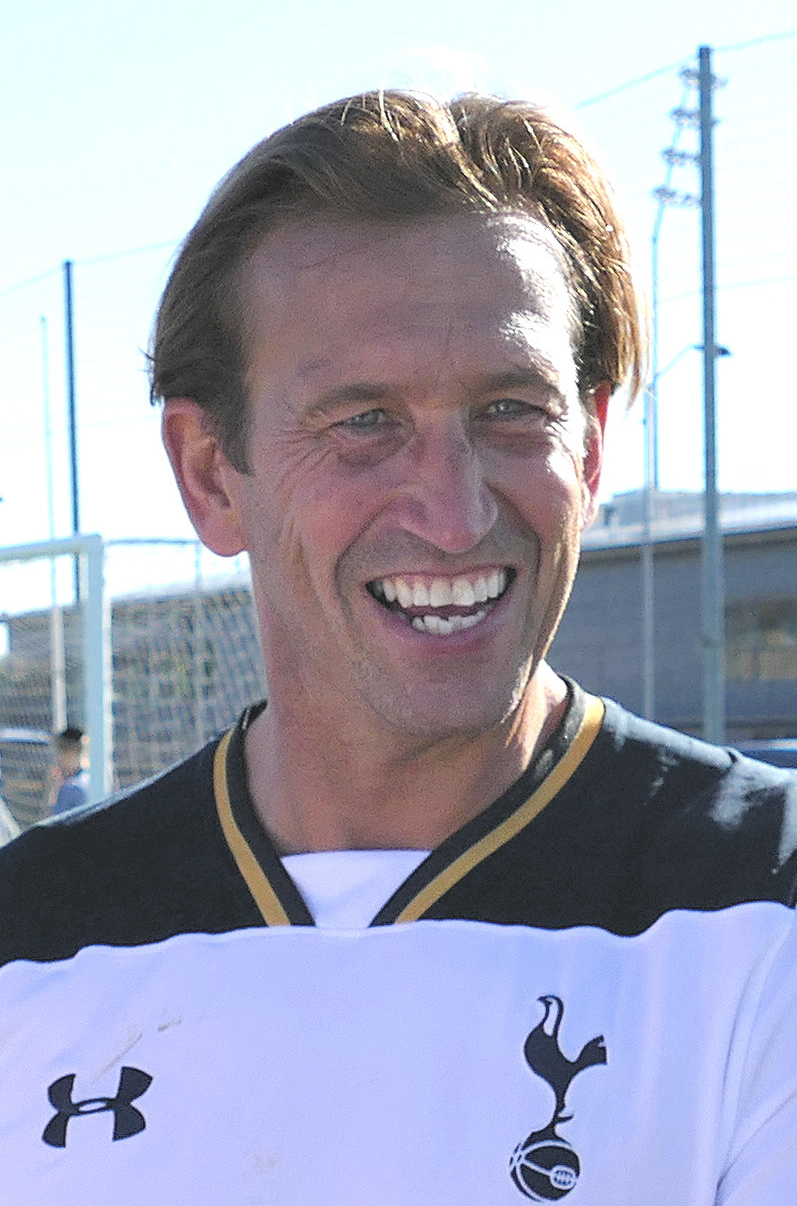
- Edinburgh in 2016

Personal information
- Full name: Justin Charles Edinburgh
- Date of birth: 18 December 1969
- Place of birth: Basildon, England
- Date of death: 8 June 2019 (aged 49)
- Place of death: Basildon, England
- Height: 5 ft 10 in (1.78 m)
- Position: Left back

Senior career*
Years	Team	Apps	(Gls)
1988–1990	Southend United	37	(0)
1990	→ Tottenham Hotspur (loan)	0	(0)
1990–2000	Tottenham Hotspur	213	(1)
2000	→ Portsmouth (loan)	1	(0)
2000–2003	Portsmouth	34	(1)
2003–2006	Billericay Town		
Total		287	(2)

Managerial career
- 2003–2006: Billericay Town
- 2006: Fisher Athletic
- 2007–2008: Grays Athletic
- 2009–2011: Rushden & Diamonds
- 2011–2015: Newport County
- 2015–2017: Gillingham
- 2017: Northampton Town
- 2017–2019: Leyton Orient
- * Club domestic league appearances and goals

Justin Charles Edinburgh (18 December 1969 – 8 June 2019) was an English professional football manager and footballer who played as a left back.

He played in the Premier League for Tottenham Hotspur, where he made 213 league appearances in a decade at the club. He also played in the Football League for Southend United and Portsmouth before finishing his career with non-league side Billericay Town. In 1991 he was part of Spurs FA Cup winning side wearing number 2 and he also won the League Cup with the club in 1999, despite being sent off in the final.

Following retirement, he managed at non-league level for Fisher Athletic, Grays Athletic and Rushden & Diamonds before taking Newport County to the Football League during a four-year tenure. He went on to manage both Gillingham and Northampton Town before once more winning promotion from the National League as he guided Leyton Orient back to the EFL in 2019. He remained manager of Orient at the time of his death in June 2019.

== Playing career ==
A defender, usually employed as a left-back, Edinburgh started his career as a trainee with Southend United, turning professional in August 1988. He helped the Shrimpers win promotion from the Football League Fourth Division in 1990. In all competitions he played 47 games for the seaside club, scoring one goal.

He moved to Tottenham Hotspur for £150,000 in January 1990, initially on loan. He joined Spurs permanently in July 1990, making his debut for them on 10 November 1990, as a substitute in a 4–2 win at home to Wimbledon. He played for Spurs for most of the 1990s. He won an FA Cup winner's medal in 1991 despite just previously starting only 12 league games. He would also win a League Cup winner's medal with Spurs, in 1999. This second medal was awarded to Edinburgh despite his being sent off in the final for raising his arms to Robbie Savage, as the post-match analysis showed that Savage had distinctly over-reacted to a minimal contact and that the red card was unjustly awarded. In total, he made 213 league appearances for Tottenham, scoring once.

Edinburgh left London for Portsmouth in March 2000 for a fee of £175,000, playing 35 league games over the next two years, scoring once against Sheffield United. However, he did not play a single competitive game during Portsmouth's Division One title winning campaign (2002–03), and joined non-league Billericay Town as player-manager in July 2003.

== Managerial career ==
=== Early career ===
In January 2006, he left Billericay to become manager of semi-professional club Fisher Athletic. Fisher finished third in the Isthmian League Premier Division in season 2005–06 and beat Hampton & Richmond 3–0 in the play-off final to win promotion to Conference South. Edinburgh left Fisher by mutual consent in November 2006.

He subsequently joined Grays Athletic as assistant manager to Andy King in December 2006, and took over as manager on 5 January 2007 after King's resignation. However, Edinburgh's first match in charge ended in disappointment as his team lost 3–1 to Southport. His reign as manager of Grays Athletic came to an end on 20 February 2008, when his contract was terminated by mutual consent, leaving the club 14th in the Conference Premier.

On 9 April 2008 it was announced that Edinburgh would become Colin Lippiatt's assistant at Woking following the departure of Frank Gray and Gerry Murphy.

=== Rushden & Diamonds ===
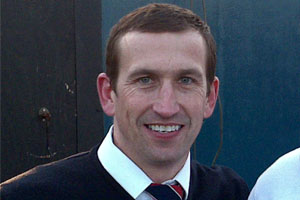
Edinburgh in 2010

In October 2008, Edinburgh became assistant manager to Garry Hill at Conference Premier club Rushden & Diamonds. On 10 February 2009 he was appointed as caretaker manager following Hill's resignation and on 24 April 2009, Edinburgh was appointed manager on a permanent basis. He guided the team to a fourth-placed finish in the 2009–10 season securing a play-off spot within the Conference Premier but they were unable to reach the Conference Play-off Final at Wembley after lacklustre performances in both games of the two legged tie against Oxford United. The games finished 1–1 and 2–0 to Oxford.

The 2010–11 season saw Rushden & Diamonds secure a mid-table finish in 13th place but they never seriously challenged for promotion. In the summer of 2011, the club was expelled from the Football Conference and subsequently went into administration, bringing Edinburgh's time at the club to an end.

=== Newport County ===
On 4 October 2011, Edinburgh was appointed manager of Newport County, taking over from Anthony Hudson with the team in 23rd place in the Conference Premier. Jimmy Dack was appointed as his assistant manager on 6 October 2011. Newport County finished the 2011–12 season in 19th position hence avoiding relegation and reached the FA Trophy final at Wembley Stadium on 12 May 2012 which Newport lost 2–0 to York City.

In August 2012, Edinburgh was selected as Conference Manager of the Month after Newport County won all five of their opening matches of the 2012–13 season. He led Newport to a 3rd-place finish that season, reaching the Conference Premier play-offs. Newport County won the 2013 Conference Premier play-off final versus Wrexham at Wembley stadium 2–0 to return to the Football League after a 25-year absence with promotion to League Two. Edinburgh was named the Conference Premier Manager of the Year.

On 2 December 2013, Newport County announced on their official website that, having consulted Edinburgh, they had rejected an approach from Edinburgh's former club Portsmouth to be interviewed as a successor to Guy Whittingham as Portsmouth manager. In January 2014 Edinburgh stated he had rebuffed an unofficial approach directly to himself to be considered as manager of Northampton Town. In his first season as a Football League manager Edinburgh led Newport County to a 14th-place finish in League Two for the 2013–14 season.

=== Gillingham ===
On 7 February 2015, with Newport County in sixth place in League Two, Edinburgh was appointed manager of League One club Gillingham, with Gillingham paying Newport compensation as Edinburgh was under contract. Edinburgh led the Gills to a 12th-place finish in the third tier of English football, after a poor start to the season led to the sacking of former manager Peter Taylor on 31 December. Gillingham had won just three of their first 15 league games, and were sitting 20th in League One, just two points above relegation.

The 2015–16 was his first full season in charge, Edinburgh led the Gills to a second-place position at Christmas, after a 3–0 victory against Millwall. Gillingham had also managed to defeat League favourites Sheffield United, with a 4–0 victory on the first day of the season. However, after a run of bad injuries to crucial players, Gillingham slipped to a ninth-place finish in League One, after losing on the last day of the season, against Millwall.

Edinburgh was sacked on 3 January 2017, along with his entire coaching team, with the club placed 17th in League One.

=== Northampton Town ===
On 13 January 2017, Edinburgh was appointed manager of League One club Northampton Town on a two-and-a-half-year contract, formally taking over on 16 January. Edinburgh was dismissed on 31 August 2017, following a poor run of results including losing the first four matches of the season.

=== Leyton Orient ===
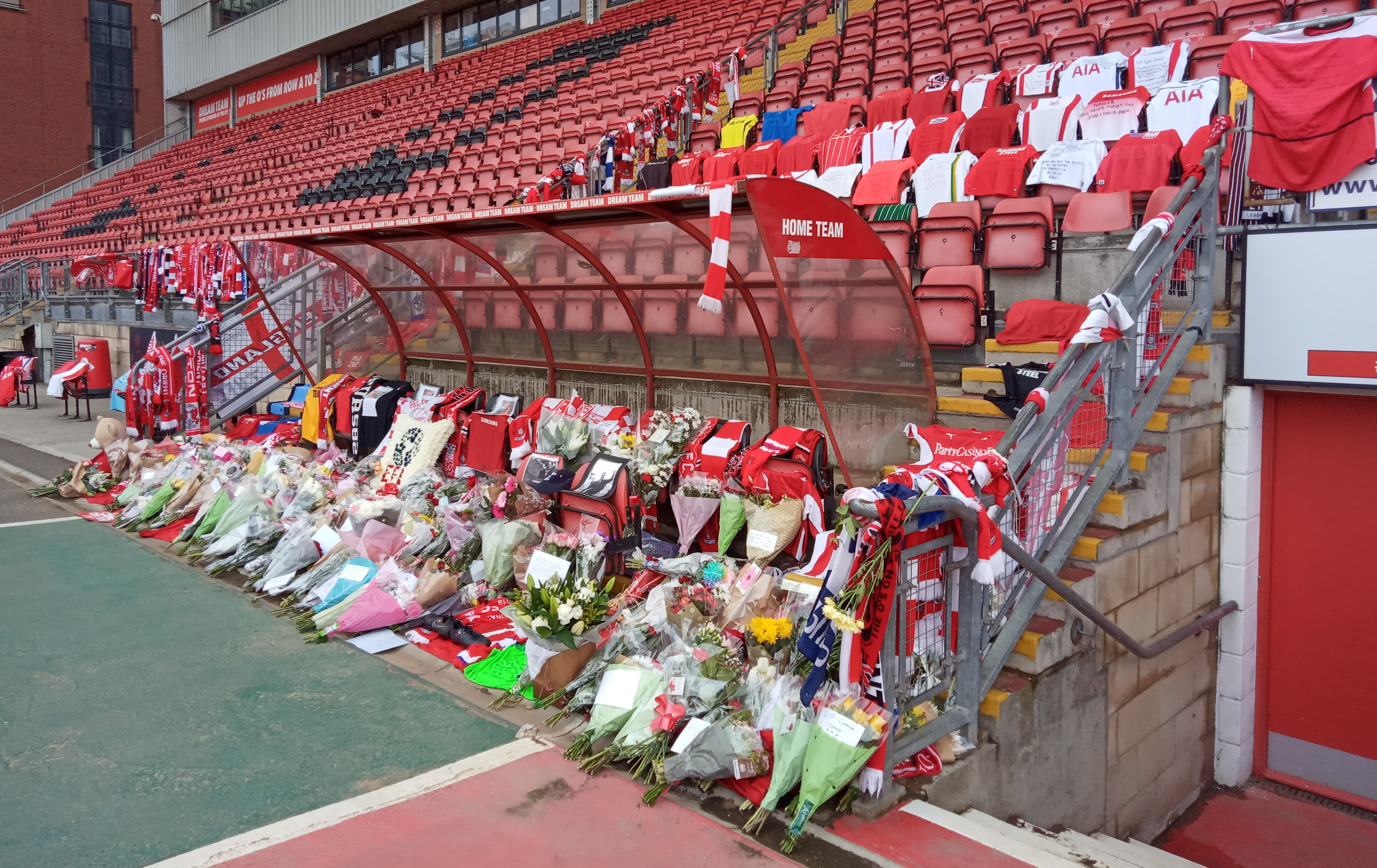
Tributes around the manager's dugout at Brisbane Road

On 29 November 2017, Edinburgh was appointed manager of Leyton Orient of the National League on a two-and-a-half-year contract. Edinburgh guided Orient to the top of the National League winning the division and promotion back to the Football League in the 2018–19 campaign.

On 24 January 2020, Leyton Orient announced that the West Stand at Breyer Group Stadium would be renamed the Justin Edinburgh Stand, which was officially commemorated the next day during the club's home match against Newport County.

== Personal life and death ==
Edinburgh had two children with his wife Kerri. He owned two Toni & Guy hair salon franchises with his business partner, Jim Shaw.

On 3 June 2019, Edinburgh went into sudden cardiac arrest. He died at Basildon University Hospital five days later, aged 49. Leyton Orient announced a period of mourning and opened the stadium to allow supporters to leave tributes.

== Managerial statistics ==
Managerial record by team and tenure
Team	From	To	Record					Ref.
Team	From	To	P	W	D	L	Win %	Ref.
Grays Athletic	5 January 2007	20 February 2008	63	24	13	26	38.1	
Rushden & Diamonds	10 February 2009	7 July 2011	116	48	34	34	41.4	
Newport County	4 October 2011	7 February 2015	181	75	46	60	41.4	
Gillingham	7 February 2015	3 January 2017	101	39	26	36	38.6	
Northampton Town	16 January 2017	31 August 2017	25	6	6	13	24.0	
Leyton Orient	29 November 2017	8 June 2019	82	45	21	16	54.9	
Total			568	237	146	185	41.7	—

== Honours ==
=== As a player ===
Tottenham Hotspur

- FA Cup: 1990–91
- Football League Cup: 1998–99
- FA Charity Shield: 1991 (shared)

=== As a manager ===
Newport County

- Conference Premier play-offs: 2013
- FA Trophy runner-up: 2011–12

Leyton Orient

- National League: 2018–19
- FA Trophy runner-up: 2018–19

=== Individual ===
- Conference Premier/National League Manager of the Month: April/May 2013, November 2018, March 2019
- Leyton Orient Hall of Fame
- Newport County Hall of Fame
