= 2012–13 AFC Wimbledon season =

AFC Wimbledon
2012–13 season
- Chairman: Erik Samuelson
- Manager: Terry Brown (sacked 19 September 2012); Simon Bassey (caretaker, until 10 October 2012); Neal Ardley
- League Two: 20th
- Football League Cup: First Round v Stevenage
- FA Cup: Second Round v MK Dons
- Football League Trophy: First Round v Southend United
- Top goalscorer: League: Jack Midson, 13; All: Jack Midson, 15
- Highest home attendance: 4,749 v Exeter City (13 April 2013)
- Lowest home attendance: 3,350 v Torquay United (18 September 2012)
- Average home league attendance: 4,060
Home colours	Away colours	Third colours

The 2012–13 season was AFC Wimbledon's second season in the Football League. It also marked the 10th anniversary since AFC Wimbledon's formation in 2002.

== League table ==
Pos	Team	Pld	W	D	L	GF	GA	GD	Pts
18	Accrington Stanley	46	14	12	20	51	68	−17	54
19	Torquay United	46	13	14	19	55	62	−7	53
20	AFC Wimbledon	46	14	11	21	54	76	−22	53
21	Plymouth Argyle	46	13	13	20	46	55	−9	52
22	Dagenham & Redbridge	46	13	12	21	55	62	−7	51

Updated to match(es) played on 27 April 2013. Source: BBC Sport
Rules for classification: 1) Points; 2) Goal difference; 3) Number of goals scored

== Results summary ==
Round	1	2	3	4	5	6	7	8	9	10	11	12	13	14	15	16	17	18	19	20	21	22	23	24	25	26	27	28	29	30	31	32	33	34	35	36	37	38	39	40	41	42	43	44	45	46
Ground	H	A	A	H	A	H	H	A	H	A	A	H	A	H	H	A	A	H	H	A	A	H	H	A	A	H	H	H	A	A	H	H	A	H	A	H	A	A	A	H	A	H	A	H	A	H
Result	W	L	L	D	L	L	L	W	L	L	W	L	D	W	L	L	W	D	L	L	D	L	L	W	W	D	D	D	L	L	W	D	W	D	L	W	W	W	L	W	L	L	L	D	D	W
Position	9	14	17	17	21	21	21	20	22	22	21	22	22	21	21	21	21	20	20	22	21	22	24	24	22	23	24	24	24	24	24	24	21	23	24	21	18	18	18	16	18	19	21	21	23	20

Updated to match(es) played on 27 April 2013. Source: BBC Sport
A = Away; H = Home; W = Win; D = Draw; L = Loss

Overall								Home						Away					
Pld	W	D	L	GF	GA	GD	Pts	W	D	L	GF	GA	GD	W	D	L	GF	GA	GD
46	14	11	21	54	76	−22	53	6	8	9	28	34	−6	8	3	12	26	42	−16

Last updated: 27 April 2013.
Source: BBC Sport

== Match results ==
=== Pre-season Friendlies ===
14 July 2012	AFC Wimbledon	0–7	Reading	Kingsmeadow
15:00		Report	Le Fondre 26' 44' (pen.); Antonio 50'; Church 52' 56' 67'; Obita 57'	Attendance: 2,140

17 July 2012	Maidenhead United	1–3	AFC Wimbledon	York Road
	Behzadi (pen.), 28'	Report	Midson 13' 47'; Long 30'

21 July 2012	Bognor Regis Town	0–2	AFC Wimbledon	Nyewood Lane
19:30		Report	Collier 67'; L. Moore 89'

24 July 2012 Phil Ledger Memorial Cup	Woking	2–1	AFC Wimbledon	Kingfield Stadium
19:45	Bubb 17'; McNerney 72'	Report	Midson 80' (pen.)	Attendance: 1,005

28 July 2012	Eastbourne Borough	0–0	AFC Wimbledon	Langney Sports Club
15:00		Report		Attendance: 710

31 July 2012	AFC Wimbledon	1–4	Preston North End	Kingsmeadow
19:45	Jolley 21'	Report	Byrom 12' 53'; Sodje 18' 24'	Attendance: 782

4 August 2012	AFC Wimbledon	2–4	West Ham United XI	Kingsmeadow
15:00	L. Moore 13' 36'		Piquionne 48' (pen.); Turgott 77'	Attendance: 1,067

8 August 2012	AFC Wimbledon	0–2	Portsmouth	Kingsmeadow
19:45		Report	Rodgers 12'; Walker 23'

=== League Two ===
==== August ====
18 August 2012 Game 1	AFC Wimbledon	1–0	Chesterfield	Kingsmeadow
15:00 BST (UTC+01)	Midson 35'; Balkestein (yellow card) 85'	Report	Togwell (yellow card) 35'; Westcarr (yellow card) 89'	Attendance: 3,780; Referee: Gavin Ward

21 August 2012 Game 2	Burton Albion	6–2	AFC Wimbledon	Pirelli Stadium
19:45 BST (UTC+01)	Taylor 8'; Kee 13'; Maghoma 15'; Richards 28'; Weir 53'; Diamond 68'	Report	Harrison 79' (yellow card) 89'; Balkestein 80'; Midson (yellow card) 86'	Attendance: 1,948; Referee: Darren Bond

25 August 2012 Game 3	Bradford City	5–1	AFC Wimbledon	Valley Parade
15:00 BST (UTC+01)	Wells 3'; Haynes-Brown 13' (o.g.); Davies 31'; McArdle 37'; Hanson 45'	Report	Fenlon (yellow card) 29'; Harris 35'	Attendance: 9,436; Referee: Patrick Miller

==== September ====
1 September 2012 Game 4	AFC Wimbledon	2–2	Dagenham & Redbridge	Kingsmeadow
15:00 BST (UTC+01)	Midson 30'; Harrison 35'	Report	Spillane 28'; Howell 56'	Attendance: 3,507; Referee: Darren Deadman

8 September 2012 Game 5	Northampton Town	2–0	AFC Wimbledon	Sixfields Stadium
15:00 BST (UTC+01)	Nicholls 60'; Hackett 72'	Report		Attendance: 4,235; Referee: Scott Duncan

15 September 2012 Game 6	AFC Wimbledon	1–2	Rochdale	Kingsmeadow
15:00 BST (UTC+01)	Midson (red card) 23'; Haynes-Brown (yellow card) 77'; L. Moore 81' (yellow card) 89'	Report	Adebola 10'; Grimes (yellow card) 34'; Grant 39'; Tutte (yellow card) 63'	Attendance: 3,529; Referee: Brendan Malone

18 September 2012 Game 7	AFC Wimbledon	0–1	Torquay United	Kingsmeadow
19:45 BST (UTC+01)	Jolley (yellow card) 71' (yellow card) 88' (red card); S. Moore (yellow card) 83'	Report	Howe 34'; Mansell (yellow card) 73'; Oastler (yellow card) 90+1'	Attendance: 3,350; Referee: David Coote

22 September 2012 Game 8	Wycombe Wanderers	0–1	AFC Wimbledon	Adams Park
15:00 BST (UTC+01)	Spring (yellow card) 80'; Morgan (yellow card) 84'	Report	Fenlon (yellow card) 38'; S. Moore 40'; L. Moore (yellow card) 70'	Attendance: 4,260; Referee: Graham Scott

29 September 2012 Game 9	AFC Wimbledon	1–2	Accrington Stanley	Kingsmeadow
15:00 BST (UTC+01)	Bennett (yellow card) 59'; Jolley (yellow card) 83'; S. Moore 90+2'	Report	Amond 26'; Murphy (yellow card) 49' (goal) 78'	Attendance: 3,405; Referee: Fred Graham

==== October ====
2 October 2012 Game 10	Oxford United	3–2	AFC Wimbledon	Kassam Stadium
19:45 BST (UTC+01)	Forster-Caskey 9' (yellow card) 71'; Smalley 55'; Potter 81'; Wright (yellow card) 89'	Report	Francomb (yellow card) 8'; Harrison 20'; Fenlon 36'; Gregory (yellow card) 79'; Antwi (yellow card) 89'	Attendance: 5,206; Referee: Roger East

6 October 2012 Game 11	Plymouth Argyle	1–2	AFC Wimbledon	Home Park
15:00 BST (UTC+01)	Berry (yellow card) 17'; Williams (yellow card) 35'; Purse (yellow card) 38'; Griffiths 89'	Report	Mambo (yellow card) 1'; Harrison 13'; Yussuff (yellow card) 50' (goal) 90+2'	Attendance: 6,271; Referee: Keith Stroud

13 October 2012 Game 12	AFC Wimbledon	1–2	Cheltenham Town	Kingsmeadow
15:00 BST (UTC+01)	Harrison 90+3'	Report	Pack 24'; Mohamed 56'; Carter (yellow card) 65'	Attendance: 4,409; Referee: Tim Robinson

20 October 2012 Game 13	Fleetwood Town	1–1	AFC Wimbledon	Highbury Stadium
15:00 BST (UTC+01)	Gillespie 10'	Report	Gregory (yellow card) 53'; Harrison 62'; Fenlon (yellow card) 71'	Attendance: 2,547; Referee: Jeremy Simpson

23 October 2012 Game 14	AFC Wimbledon	3–1	Bristol Rovers	Kingsmeadow
19:45 BST (UTC+01)	Kenneth 14' (o.g.); Yussuff 29' 33'; Jolley (yellow card) 90+5'	Report	Parkes (yellow card) 32' (yellow card) 83' (red card); Eaves 73'; Lund (yellow card) 90+1'; Kenneth (yellow card) 90+3'	Attendance: 3,714; Referee: Pat Miller

27 October 2012 Game 15	AFC Wimbledon	0–1	Gillingham	Kingsmeadow
15:00 BST (UTC+01)		Report	Vincelot 23'; Lee (yellow card) 87'	Attendance: 4,546; Referee: Chris Sarginson

==== November ====
6 November 2012 Game 16	Exeter City	2–0	AFC Wimbledon	St James Park
19:45 GMT	Gow (yellow card) 7'; Cureton 32'; O'Flynn 71'	Report		Attendance: 3,249; Referee: Steve Martin

10 November 2012 Game 17	York City	0–3	AFC Wimbledon	Bootham Crescent
15:00 GMT		Report	Reeves (yellow card) 39'; Harrison 54'; Long 80'; Midson 84' (pen.)	Attendance: 3,585; Referee: Tony Bates

17 November 2012 Game 18	AFC Wimbledon	1–1	Aldershot Town	Kingsmeadow
15:00 GMT	Strutton (yellow card) 62'; Reeves (yellow card) 67'; Long 77'	Report	López 45+2'	Attendance: 4,321; Referee: Geoff Eltrigham

20 November 2012 Game 19	AFC Wimbledon	0–4	Southend United	Kingsmeadow
19:45 GMT	Meades (yellow card) 52'	Report	Tomlin 43' 67'; Creswell 61'; Corr 88'	Attendance: 3,753; Referee: Darren Bond

24 November 2012 Game 20	Morecambe	3–1	AFC Wimbledon	Globe Arena
15:00 GMT	Ellison 7' 34' 79' (yellow card) 90'; Mustoe (yellow card) 31'	Report	Midson 67' (pen.); McCallum (red card) 82'; Antwi (yellow card) 90'; Fenlon (yellow card) 90+2'	Attendance: 1,616; Referee: Craig Pawson

==== December ====
8 December 2012 Game 21	Barnet	1–1	AFC Wimbledon	Underhill Stadium
15:00 GMT	Hyde 64'; Byrne (yellow card) 87'; Holmes (yellow card) 90'	Report	Ajala (yellow card) 23'; Long 84'	Attendance: 3,217; Referee: Stuart Attwell

15 December 2012 Game 22	AFC Wimbledon	0–1	Rotherham United	Kingsmeadow
15:00 GMT	Antwi (yellow card) 26'; Fenlon (yellow card) 74'	Report	Sharps (yellow card) 30'; Nardiello (yellow card) 35'; Agard 79' (yellow card) 80'; Warrington (yellow card) 90+1'	Attendance: 3,718; Referee: David Phillips

29 December 2012 Game 23	AFC Wimbledon	0–3	Oxford United	Kingsmeadow
15:00 GMT	McCallum (yellow card) 16'; Osano (yellow card) 36'; Antwi (yellow card) 80'	Report	Rigg 32' (yellow card) 50'; Potter 37'; Craddock 64'; Constable (red card) 70'; Batt (yellow card) 89'	Attendance: 4,401; Referee: Lee Collins

==== January ====
1 January 2013 Game 24	Torquay United	2–3	AFC Wimbledon	Plainmoor
15:00 GMT	Mansell 9'; MacDonald (yellow card) 82'; Howe (yellow card) 88' (goal) 90'	Report	McCallum 5'; Mitchel-King 33'; Long 90+4' (pen.)	Attendance: 2,618; Referee: Oliver Langford

5 January 2013 Game 25	Rochdale	0–1	AFC Wimbledon	Spotland Stadium
15:00 GMT	Rafferty (yellow card) 18' (yellow card) 59' (red card)	Report	McCallum 56'; Midson (yellow card) 71'	Attendance: 2,071; Referee: Keith Wright

12 January 2013 Game 26	AFC Wimbledon	2–2	Wycombe Wanderers	Kingsmeadow
15:00 GMT	McCallum 15' 41'	Report	Kuffour 8'; McClure 72'	Attendance: 4,507; Referee: Gary Sutton

24 January 2013 Game 27	AFC Wimbledon	2–2	Port Vale	Kingsmeadow
19:45 GMT	Midson 8' 42' (pen.); Ajala (yellow card) 20'	Report	Chilvers (yellow card) 42'; Jones 44'; Pope 58'; Loft (yellow card) 71'	Attendance: 3,395; Referee: Graham Scott

==== February ====
2 February 2013 Game 28	AFC Wimbledon	1–1	Burton Albion	Kingsmeadow
15:00 GMT	Alexander 26'; Pell (yellow card) 67'; P. Sweeney (yellow card) 90'	Report	MacDonald (yellow card) 20'; Symes 35'; O'Connor (yellow card) 58'; Diamond (red card) 75'	Attendance: 3,684; Referee: Jeremy Simpson

5 February 2013 Game 29	Port Vale	3–0	AFC Wimbledon	Vale Park
19:45 GMT	Hughes 13'; Vincent 35' 75'	Report		Attendance: 5,567; Referee: Mark Brown

9 February 2013 Game 30	Chesterfield	2–0	AFC Wimbledon	Proact Stadium
15:00 GMT	Lester (yellow card) 34' (goal) 83'; Gnanduillet 59'; O'Shea (yellow card) 73'	Report	Fenlon (yellow card) 38'; P. Sweeney (yellow card) 57'; Ajala (yellow card) 78'	Attendance: 5,235; Referee: Iain Williamson

16 February 2013 Game 31	AFC Wimbledon	2–1	Bradford City	Kingsmeadow
15:00 GMT	Alexander (yellow card) 39' (goal) 90+3'; Midson 83'	Report	Thompson 59'	Attendance: 4,320; Referee: Stephen Bratt

19 February 2013 Game 32	AFC Wimbledon	1–1	Northampton Town	Kingsmeadow
19:45 GMT	Bennett 28'; Alexander (yellow card) 41'; Ajala (yellow card) 84'	Report	Collins (yellow card) 23'; Hornby (yellow card) 57'; Widdowson (yellow card) 65'; Akinfenwa 76' (pen.)	Attendance: 4,129; Referee: Fred Graham

23 February 2013 Game 33	Dagenham & Redbridge	0–1	AFC Wimbledon	Victoria Road
15:00 GMT	Doe (yellow card) 29'; Ogogo (yellow card) 58'	Report	L. Moore (yellow card) 73'; Sainte-Luce 80'; Darko (yellow card) 89'	Attendance: 2,265; Referee: Andy Woolmer

26 February 2013 Game 34	AFC Wimbledon	1–1	Plymouth Argyle	Kingsmeadow
19:45 GMT	Pell 28'	Report	Banton 26'; Richards (yellow card) 85'; Cowan-Hall (yellow card) 90+2'	Attendance: 4,480; Referee: Tim Robinson

==== March ====
2 March 2013 Game 35	Cheltenham Town	2–1	AFC Wimbledon	Whaddon Road
15:00 GMT	Elliott 10'; Carter (yellow card) 49' (goal) 56'; Penn (yellow card) 83'	Report	Hussey (yellow card) 49'; Dickenson 63' (yellow card) 90+1'; Balkestein (yellow card) 84'	Attendance: 3,177; Referee: Andy Davies

9 March 2013 Game 36	AFC Wimbledon	3–2	York City	Kingsmeadow
15:00 GMT	Mitchel-King 21'; Dickenson 60'; Pell (yellow card) 68' (goal) 79'; S. Moore (yellow card) 90+4'	Report	Smith 29' 72'; Chambers (yellow card) 83'; Rodman (yellow card) 84'	Attendance: 4,349; Referee: Steve Rushton

12 March 2013 Game 37	Southend United	1–3	AFC Wimbledon	Roots Hall
19:45 GMT	Clohessy 29' (pen.); Prosser (yellow card) 90+4'	Report	Meades (yellow card) 24'; Youga (yellow card) 26'; Balkestein 32'; Midson 47'; L. Moore 69'; S. Moore (yellow card) 75'	Attendance: 4,236; Referee: Dean Whitestone

16 March 2013 Game 38	Aldershot Town	0–1	AFC Wimbledon	Recreation Ground
15:00 GMT		Report	Midson 72'	Attendance: 3,699; Referee: Paul Tierney

19 March 2013 Game 39	Accrington Stanley	4–0	AFC Wimbledon	Crown Ground
19:45 GMT	Jeffers 5' 19'; Hatfield 32'; Molyneux 64'	Report	Dickenson (yellow card) 86'	Attendance: 2,149; Referee: Chris Sarginson

23 March 2013 Game 40	AFC Wimbledon	2–0	Morecambe	Kingsmeadow
15:00 GMT	Mitchel-King (yellow card) 34'; Sainte-Luce 38'; Midson 45' (pen.); Hussey (yellow card) 71'	Report		Attendance: 3,902; Referee: Gavin Ward

29 March 2013 Game 41	Rotherham United	1–0	AFC Wimbledon	New York Stadium
15:00 GMT	Skarz (yellow card) 60'; Revell 76'	Report	L. Moore (yellow card) 64'	Attendance: 7,594; Referee: Mark Heywood

==== April ====
1 April 2013 Game 42	AFC Wimbledon	0–1	Barnet	Kingsmeadow
15:00 GMT	Sainte-Luce (yellow card) 40'	Report	Oster (yellow card) 53'; Byrne (yellow card) 55'; Nurse (yellow card) 59'; Marsh-Brown 85'	Attendance: 4,696; Referee: Tony Bates

6 April 2013 Game 43	Bristol Rovers	1–0	AFC Wimbledon	Memorial Stadium
15:00 GMT	Hitchcock 82' (yellow card) 83'	Report		Attendance: 6,881; Referee: Scott Duncan

13 April 2013 Game 44	AFC Wimbledon	2–2	Exeter City	Kingsmeadow
15:00 GMT	L. Moore 58' 63'	Report	Reid 36' 61'	Attendance: 4,749; Referee: Stephen Martin

20 April 2013 Game 45	Gillingham	2–2	AFC Wimbledon	Priestfield Stadium
15:00 GMT	Burton 12'; Kedwell 23'; Whelpdale (yellow card) 25'	Report	Midson 65'; Meades 82'; Osano (yellow card) 88'	Attendance: 11,172; Referee: Andy D'Urso

27 April 2013 Game 46	AFC Wimbledon	2–1	Fleetwood Town	Kingsmeadow
15:00 GMT	Alexander 61'; Midson 72' (pen.); Strutton (yellow card) 90'	Report	Beeley (yellow card) 60'; Mangan 64'	Attendance: 4,738; Referee: James Linington

=== FA Cup 2012–13 ===
3 November 2012 First Round	York City	1–1	AFC Wimbledon	Bootham Crescent
15:00 GMT	Reed 62'	Report	Antwi (yellow card) 58'; Strutton 80'	Attendance: 2,752; Referee: Richard Clark

12 November 2012 Replay	AFC Wimbledon	4–3 (a.e.t.)	York City	Kingsmeadow
19:45 GMT	Gregory (yellow card) 13'; Strutton 34' 78' (yellow card) 80'; Harrison 97'; Midson 99'	Report	Kerr (yellow card) 8' (yellow card) 35' (red card); Brown 22' (o.g.); Reed 90' 119'; Johnson (yellow card) 108'	Attendance: 1,954; Referee: Keith Stroud

2 December 2012 Second Round	MK Dons	2–1	AFC Wimbledon	Stadium mk
12:30 GMT	Gleeson 45'; Otsemobor 90+1'	Report	L. Moore (yellow card) 45'; Midson 59' (yellow card) 60'; Ajala (yellow card) 85'	Attendance: 16,459; Referee: Scott Mathieson

=== Football League Cup 2012–13 ===
15 August 2012 First Round	Stevenage	3–1	AFC Wimbledon	Broadhall Way
19:45 BST (UTC+01)	Balkestein 14' (o.g.); Dunne 38'; Roberts 45'; Morais (yellow card) 49'	Report	S. Moore (yellow card) 39'; Kiernan 41'; MacDonald (yellow card) 45'	Attendance: 2,018; Referee: Stuart Attwell

=== Football League Trophy 2012–13 ===
4 September 2012 First Round	Southend United	2–1	AFC Wimbledon	Roots Hall
19:45 BST (UTC+01)	Straker (yellow card) 33'; Tomlin 59' (pen.); Spicer (yellow card) 80'; Cresswell 90'	Report	S. Moore (yellow card) 21'; Merrifield 39'	Attendance: 1,925; Referee: Andy Davies

== Squad statistics ==
=== Appearances and goals ===
As of 19 July 2013.

No.	Pos	Nat	Player	Total		League Two		FA Cup		League Cup		JP Trophy	
No.	Pos	Nat	Player	Apps	Goals	Apps	Goals	Apps	Goals	Apps	Goals	Apps	Goals
1	GK	(England) ENG	Seb Brown	19	0	16	0	2	0	1	0	0	0
8	MF	(England) ENG	Sammy Moore	30	2	25+3	2	0	0	1	0	1	0
10	FW	(England) ENG	Jack Midson	48	15	38+5	13	3	2	1	0	1	0
11	FW	(England) ENG	Luke Moore	38	4	27+8	4	2	0	1	0	0	0
12	MF	(England) ENG	Harry Pell	17	2	17	2	0	0	0	0	0	0
15	DF	(England) ENG	Jim Fenlon	21	1	16+1	1	3	0	0	0	1	0
16	MF	(France) FRA	Kevin Sainte-Luce	14	2	5+9	2	0	0	0	0	0	0
21	FW	(England) ENG	Charlie Strutton	17	3	2+12	0	1+2	3	0	0	0	0
27	MF	(Scotland) SCO	Peter Sweeney	7	0	7	0	0	0	0	0	0	0
29	DF	(Ghana) GHA	Will Antwi	25	0	22+1	0	2	0	0	0	0	0
39	DF	(Ireland) EIR	Alan Bennett	18	1	18	1	0	0	0	0	0	0
Players who played on loan for AFC Wimbledon but subsequently returned to their parent club:
9	FW	(England) ENG	Ben Dickenson	7	2	5+2	2	0	0	0	0	0	0
14	FW	(Austria) AUT	Jesse Darko	12	0	2+10	0	0	0	0	0	0	0
16	DF	(England) ENG	Angus MacDonald	6	0	2+2	0	0	0	1	0	1	0
22	DF	(England) ENG	Curtis Haynes-Brown	6	0	3+3	0	0	0	0	0	0	0
22	GK	(England) ENG	John Sullivan	11	0	11	0	0	0	0	0	0	0
24	MF	(England) ENG	George Francomb	16	0	14+1	0	0	0	0	0	1	0
25	DF	(England) ENG	Dale Bennett	6	0	5	0	0	0	0	0	1	0
28	MF	(England) ENG	Steven Gregory	18	0	15	0	3	0	0	0	0	0
28	FW	(England) ENG	Gary Alexander	18	3	16+2	3	0	0	0	0	0	0
30	MF	(England) ENG	Yado Mambo	16	0	13	0	3	0	0	0	0	0
31	DF	(Wales) WAL	Jonathan Meades	26	1	26	1	0	0	0	0	0	0
32	MF	(England) ENG	Jake Reeves	5	0	5	0	0	0	0	0	0	0
35	GK	(Scotland) SCO	Neil Sullivan	19	0	18	0	1	0	0	0	0	0
37	FW	(England) ENG	Paul McCallum	9	4	6+3	4	0	0	0	0	0	0
38	MF	(England) ENG	Toby Ajala	13	0	11+1	0	1	0	0	0	0	0
Players who played for AFC Wimbledon but were subsequently released or sold by the club:
2	DF	(Kenya) KEN	Curtis Osano	20	0	15+2	0	1+2	0	0	0	0	0
3	DF	(Scotland) SCO	Warren Cummings	12	0	7+2	0	2	0	1	0	0	0
4	MF	(England) ENG	Louis Harris	9	1	6+1	1	1	0	0+1	0	0	0
5	DF	(Netherlands) NED	Pim Balkestein	27	2	22+2	2	0+1	0	1	0	0+1	0
6	DF	(England) ENG	Mat Mitchel-King	25	2	22+1	2	1	0	1	0	0	0
7	MF	(England) ENG	Stacy Long	32	3	23+5	3	1+1	0	1	0	0+1	0
9	FW	(England) ENG	Byron Harrison	26	8	16+5	7	1+2	1	0+1	0	1	0
12	MF	(England) ENG	Christian Jolley	19	0	6+9	0	2	0	1	0	0+1	0
14	DF	(England) ENG	Callum McNaughton	1	0	1	0	0	0	0	0	0	0
17	MF	(England) ENG	Huw Johnson	11	0	1+7	0	1+1	0	0	0	1	0
18	MF	(England) ENG	Brendan Kiernan	8	1	2+4	0	0	0	1	1	1	0
19	FW	(England) ENG	Jason Prior	6	0	1+5	0	0	0	0	0	0	0
20	MF	(England) ENG	Frankie Merrifield	6	1	1+4	0	0	0	0	0	1	1
23	MF	(England) ENG	Rashid Yussuff	25	3	16+7	3	2	0	0	0	0	0
25	DF	(Central African Republic) CAF	Kelly Youga	3	0	3	0	0	0	0	0	0	0
33	GK	(Venezuela) VEN	Mikhael Jaimez-Ruiz	2	0	1	0	0	0	0	0	1	0
34	MF	(England) ENG	Kieran Djilali	5	0	0+5	0	0	0	0	0	0	0
36	MF	(England) ENG	Ryan Hervel	0	0	0	0	0	0	0	0	0	0
44	DF	(England) ENG	Chris Hussey	19	0	18+1	0	0	0	0	0	0	0

=== Top scorers ===
Place	Position	Nation	Number	Name	League Two	FA Cup	League Cup	JP Trophy	Total
1	FW	(England)	10	Jack Midson	13	2	0	0	15
2	FW	(England)	9	Byron Harrison	7	1	0	0	8
3	FW	(England)	11	Luke Moore	4	0	0	0	4
=	FW	(England)	37	Paul McCallum	4	0	0	0	4
4	MF	(England)	7	Stacy Long	3	0	0	0	3
=	MF	(England)	23	Rashid Yussuff	3	0	0	0	3
=	FW	(England)	28	Gary Alexander	3	0	0	0	3
=	FW	(England)	21	Charlie Strutton	0	3	0	0	3
5	MF	(England)	8	Sammy Moore	2	0	0	0	2
=	MF	(England)	12	Harry Pell	2	0	0	0	2
=	FW	(England)	9	Ben Dickenson	2	0	0	0	2
=	DF	(England)	6	Mat Mitchel-King	2	0	0	0	2
=	DF	(Netherlands)	5	Pim Balkestein	2	0	0	0	2
=	MF	(France)	16	Kevin Sainte-Luce	2	0	0	0	2
6	DF	(Republic of Ireland)	39	Alan Bennett	1	0	0	0	1
=	DF	(England)	15	Jim Fenlon	1	0	0	0	1
=	MF	(England)	4	Louis Harris	1	0	0	0	1
=	DF	(Wales)	31	Jonathan Meades	1	0	0	0	1
=	MF	(England)	18	Brendan Kiernan	0	0	1	0	1
=	MF	(England)	20	Frankie Merrifield	0	0	0	1	1
				TOTALS	53*	6	1	1	61

*Including own goals by opposition.

=== Disciplinary record ===
Number	Nation	Position	Name	League Two		FA Cup		League Cup		JP Trophy		Total	
Number	Nation	Position	Name	Yellow card	Red card	Yellow card	Red card	Yellow card	Red card	Yellow card	Red card	Yellow card	Red card
2	(Kenya)	DF	Curtis Osano	2	0	0	0	0	0	0	0	2	0
5	(Netherlands)	DF	Pim Balkestein	2	0	0	0	0	0	0	0	2	0
6	(England)	DF	Mat Mitchel-King	1	0	0	0	0	0	0	0	1	0
8	(England)	MF	Sammy Moore	3	0	0	0	1	0	1	0	5	0
9	(England)	FW	Byron Harrison	1	0	0	0	0	0	0	0	1	0
9	(England)	FW	Ben Dickenson	2	0	0	0	0	0	0	0	2	0
10	(England)	FW	Jack Midson	2	1	1	0	0	0	0	0	3	1
11	(England)	FW	Luke Moore	4	0	1	0	0	0	0	0	5	0
12	(England)	MF	Christian Jolley	3	1	0	0	0	0	0	0	3	1
12	(England)	MF	Harry Pell	2	0	0	0	0	0	0	0	2	0
14	(Austria)	FW	Jesse Darko	1	0	0	0	0	0	0	0	1	0
15	(England)	DF	Jim Fenlon	6	0	0	0	0	0	0	0	6	0
16	(England)	DF	Angus MacDonald	0	0	0	0	1	0	0	0	1	0
16	(France)	MF	Kevin Sainte-Luce	1	0	0	0	0	0	0	0	1	0
21	(England)	FW	Charlie Strutton	2	0	1	0	0	0	0	0	3	0
22	(England)	DF	Curtis Haynes-Brown	1	0	0	0	0	0	0	0	1	0
23	(England)	MF	Rashid Yussuff	1	0	0	0	0	0	0	0	1	0
25	(Central African Republic)	DF	Kelly Youga	1	0	0	0	0	0	0	0	1	0
25	(England)	DF	Dale Bennett	1	0	0	0	0	0	0	0	1	0
26	(England)	MF	George Francomb	1	0	0	0	0	0	0	0	1	0
27	(Scotland)	MF	Peter Sweeney	2	0	0	0	0	0	0	0	2	0
28	(England)	MF	Steven Gregory	2	0	1	0	0	0	0	0	3	0
28	(England)	FW	Gary Alexander	2	0	0	0	0	0	0	0	2	0
29	(Ghana)	DF	Will Antwi	4	0	1	0	0	0	0	0	5	0
30	(England)	DF	Yado Mambo	1	0	0	0	0	0	0	0	1	0
31	(Wales)	DF	Jonathan Meades	2	0	0	0	0	0	0	0	2	0
32	(England)	MF	Jake Reeves	2	0	0	0	0	0	0	0	2	0
37	(England)	FW	Paul McCallum	1	1	0	0	0	0	0	0	1	1
38	(England)	MF	Toby Ajala	4	0	1	0	0	0	0	0	5	0
44	(England)	DF	Chris Hussey	2	0	0	0	0	0	0	0	2	0
			TOTALS	59	3	6	0	2	0	1	0	68	3

== Transfers ==
Players Transferred In
Date	Pos.	Name	Previous club	Fee	Ref.
28 May 2012	DF	(Kenya) Curtis Osano	(England) Luton Town	Free	
11 June 2012	MF	(England) Louis Harris	(England) Wolverhampton Wanderers	Free	
13 June 2012	MF	(England) Stacy Long	(England) Stevenage	Free	
29 June 2012	DF	(Scotland) Warren Cummings	(England) Bournemouth	Free	
17 July 2012	DF	(Netherlands) Pim Balkestein	(England) Brentford	Free	
8 August 2012	GK	(Venezuela) Mikhael Jaimez-Ruiz	(England) Dover Athletic	Free	
14 September 2012	DF	(Ghana) Will Antwi	Unattached	Free	
16 November 2012	MF	(England) Kieran Djilali	Unattached	Free	
22 November 2012	MF	(England) Ryan Hervel	Unattached	Free	
8 January 2013	MF	(Scotland) Peter Sweeney	(England) Bury	Free	
10 January 2013	DF	(England) Chris Hussey	(England) Coventry City	Free	
28 January 2013	MF	(England) Harry Pell	(England) Hereford United	Undisclosed	
31 January 2013	MF	(France) Kevin Sainte-Luce	(Wales) Cardiff City	Free	
1 February 2013	DF	(Republic of Ireland) Alan Bennett	(England) Cheltenham Town	Free	
11 March 2013	DF	(Central African Republic) Kelly Youga	Unattached	Free	
Players Loaned In
Date from	Pos.	Name	From	Date to	Ref.
30 July 2012	DF	(England) Angus MacDonald	(England) Reading	28 September 2012	
23 August 2012	DF	(England) Curtis Haynes-Brown	(England) Yeovil Town	31 October 2012	
31 August 2012	MF	(England) George Francomb	(England) Norwich City	24 November 2012	
31 August 2012	DF	(England) Dale Bennett	(England) Watford	28 October 2012	
13 September 2012	MF	(England) Steven Gregory	(England) Bournemouth	15 December 2012	
1 October 2012	DF	(England) Yado Mambo	(England) Charlton Athletic	29 December 2012	
5 November 2012	MF	(England) Jake Reeves	(England) Brentford	3 December 2013	
5 November 2012	DF	(Wales) Jonathan Meades	(England) Bournemouth	End of the Season	
16 November 2012	GK	(Scotland) Neil Sullivan	(England) Doncaster Rovers	8 March 2013	
22 November 2012	FW	(England) Paul McCallum	(England) West Ham United	22 February 2013	
22 November 2012	MF	(England) Toby Ajala	(England) Bristol City	19 February 2013	
31 January 2013	FW	(England) Gary Alexander	(England) Crawley Town	End of the Season	
21 February 2013	FW	(Austria) Jesse Darko	(Wales) Cardiff City	End of the Season	
22 February 2013	FW	(England) Ben Dickenson	(England) Brighton & Hove Albion	23 March 2013	
8 March 2013	GK	(England) John Sullivan	(England) Charlton Athletic	End of the Season	
Players Loaned Out
Date from	Pos.	Name	To	Date to	Ref.
28 September 2012	MF	(England) Will Bor	(England) Staines Town	28 October 2012	
16 November 2012	MF	(England) Christian Jolley	(Wales) Newport County	14 December 2012	
30 November 2012	MF	(England) Frankie Merrifield	(England) Harrow Borough	4 March 2013	
30 November 2012	FW	(England) Emmanuel Akokhia	(England) Harrow Borough	4 March 2013	
7 December 2012	DF	(England) Callum McNaughton	(England) Kingstonian	7 January 2013	
19 February 2013	GK	(England) Seb Brown	(England) Woking	4 April 2013	
19 March 2013	FW	(England) Jason Prior	(England) Dartford	19 April 2013	
Players Transferred Out
Date	Pos.	Name	Subsequent club	Fee	Ref
11 January 2013	MF	(England) Christian Jolley	(Wales) Newport County	Undisclosed	
31 January 2013	FW	(England) Byron Harrison	(England) Cheltenham Town	Undisclosed	
Players Released
Date	Pos.	Name	Subsequent club	Join date	Ref.
31 January 2013	MF	(England) Kieran Djilali	(Republic of Ireland) Sligo Rovers	4 March 2013	
31 January 2013	MF	(England) Ryan Hervel			
31 January 2013	DF	(England) Callum McNaughton	(England) Kingstonian	1 February 2013	
8 April 2013	MF	(England) Brendan Kiernan	(England) Bromley	8 July 2013	
14 May 2013	FW	(England) Jason Prior	(England) Dartford	15 July 2013	
14 May 2013	MF	(England) Rashid Yussuff			
14 May 2013	DF	(Netherlands) Pim Balkestein	(Netherlands) VVV-Venlo	12 June 2013	
14 May 2013	DF	(England) Mat Mitchel-King	(England) Dartford	9 August 2013	
14 May 2013	MF	(England) Stacy Long	(England) Ebbsfleet United	8 June 2013	
14 May 2013	DF	(Kenya) Curtis Osano	(India) JSW Bangalore	16 July 2013	
14 May 2013	DF	(England) Chris Hussey	(England) Burton Albion	28 June 2013	
14 May 2013	DF	(Central African Republic) Kelly Youga			
14 May 2013	MF	(England) Louis Harris	(England) Tamworth	1 August 2013	

== Awards ==
- Football League Family Excellence Award
- Football League Award for Community Promotion of the Girls/Kids Cup
