= Curtis Osano =

Kenyan footballer (born 1987)

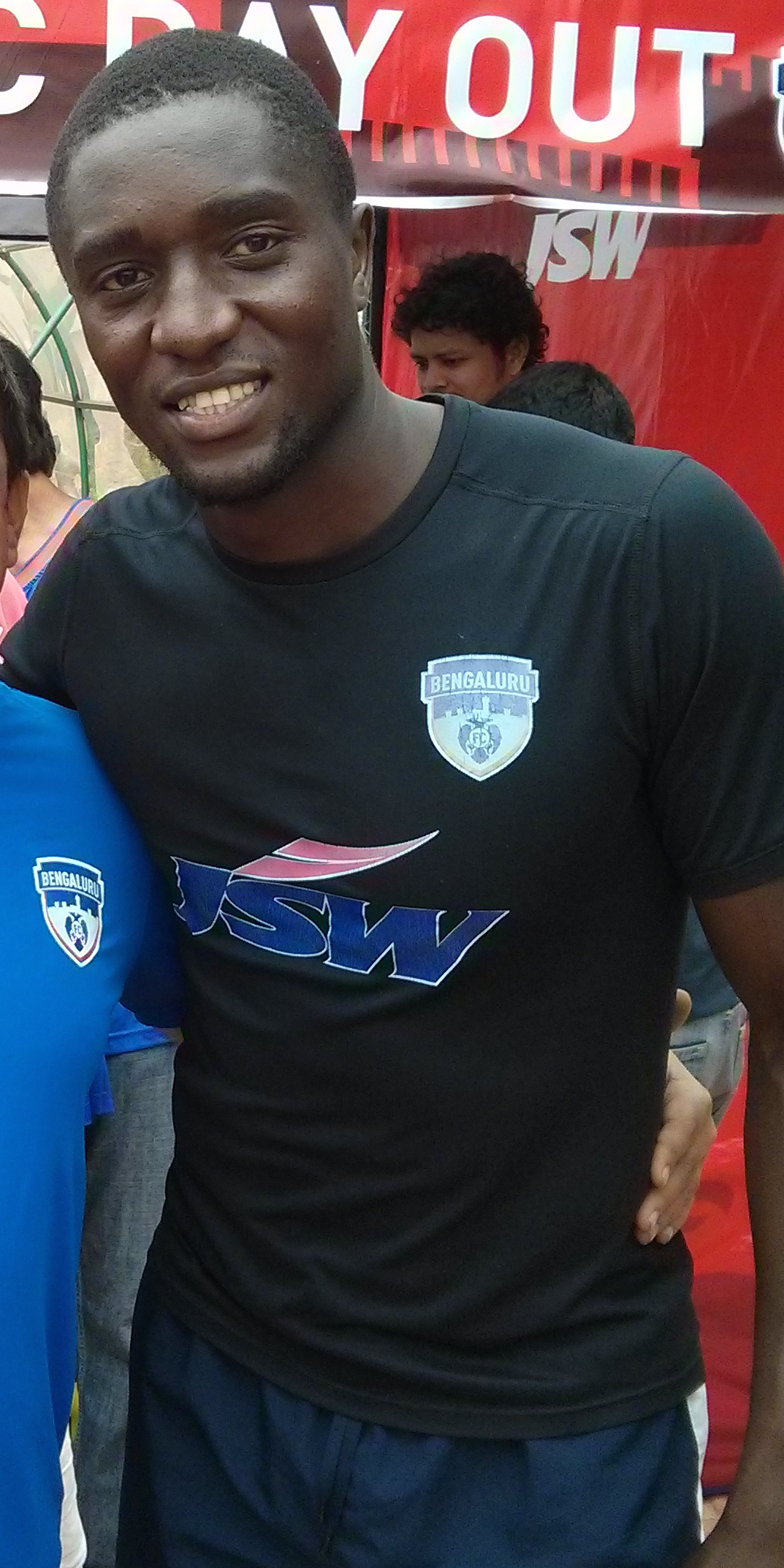
- Osano during Bengaluru FC event

Personal information
- Full name: Curtis Osano
- Date of birth: 8 March 1987 (age 39)
- Place of birth: Nakuru, Kenya
- Height: 6 ft 1 in (1.85 m)
- Position: Centre back

Youth career
- –2005: Reading

Senior career*
| Years | Team | Apps | (Gls) |
| 2005–2008 | Reading | 0 | (0) |
| 2006–2007 | → Aldershot Town (loan) | 10 | (0) |
| 2007 | → Woking (loan) | 14 | (0) |
| 2007–2008 | → Rushden & Diamonds (loan) | 42 | (0) |
| 2008–2011 | Rushden & Diamonds | 121 | (1) |
| 2011–2012 | Luton Town | 28 | (0) |
| 2012–2013 | AFC Wimbledon | 17 | (0) |
| 2013–2016 | Bengaluru FC | 54 | (2) |
| 2016–2017 | Farnborough | 30 | (1) |
- * Club domestic league appearances and goals as of 7 July 2017

Curtis Osano (born 8 March 1987) is a Kenyan footballer who plays as a defender, most recently for Farnborough.

== Career ==
=== Early years ===
Born in Nakuru, Kenya, Osano moved to England at the age nine when his father joined the British Army. However, he didn't start playing football until the age of 13, as a student at Oak Farm School in Farnborough. Around this time, he also became involved in athletics, representing Surrey in the English Schools Championships, winning silver in the triple jump. He eventually rose through the ranks at Reading as a defender under the guidance of future Liverpool manager Brendan Rodgers and was involved with the English youth set-up, though he failed to make a league appearance for "The Royals". However, he did make two appearances in the FA Cup against West Bromwich Albion and Birmingham City. Osano joined Aldershot Town in October 2006 on a month-long work experience deal, which was later extended. He then joined Woking in January 2007 on work experience until the end of the 2006–07 season.

=== Rushden & Diamonds ===
The right-back joined Rushden & Diamonds for the 2007–08 season on work experience. He joined Rushden on a two-year contract in July 2008 following his release by Reading. He scored his first career goal in a game against Altrincham in November 2008. He was released by Rushden in May 2011 due to the club's financial difficulties, having made over 160 league appearances for the club in total.

Following his release by Rushden, he was taken on trial by Championship side Brighton & Hove Albion and participated in their first pre-season game of 2011 against Burgess Hill Town. He played the first 45 minutes of the match but his stay with the club proved to be short-lived, following the signing of Romain Vincelot from Dagenham & Redbridge. During this period Osano sought work in a recycling centre to help make ends meet, staying with his former Frimley Green youth manager, John McDonnell as he searched for a new club.

=== Luton Town ===
Osano went on trial with Luton Town, earning a six-month contract on 29 July 2011 after his performances in two pre-season games. Luton Town extended his contract until the end of the season following strong performances for the club, with manager Gary Brabin said of Osano "Curtis has been excellent for us. He's a great athlete, has bags of enthusiasm, is a hard-worker and loves to get forward." He featured prominently for the club throughout the 2011–12 season and was a member of the starting eleven that competed in the 2012 Conference play-off final defeat to York City on 20 May 2012.

=== AFC Wimbledon ===
On 28 May 2012, Osano left Luton to sign for League Two side AFC Wimbledon, where he once again linked up with former teammate Will Antwi. Osano had an unfortunate start to the 2012–13 campaign when he picked up an ankle injury that prevented him from taking part in the first eight games of the season. He finally made his debut for AFC Wimbledon as a late substitute in a 2–1 loss against Accrington Stanley on 29 September 2012. On 14 May 2013, Osano was released from his contract and left AFC Wimbledon having made twenty appearances in all competitions for the club.

=== Bengaluru FC ===
On 16 July 2013, Osano joined I-League side Bengaluru FC on a free transfer. Speaking of his move to India Osano said: "I love challenges and the idea of getting into a league with a completely different style of football intrigued me. The manager is trying to bring a different brand of football and I consider it a once in a lifetime chance, a blessing that's fallen in my lap." He made his debut for the side in their first ever I-League match on 22 September 2013 against Mohun Bagan A.C. in which he started and played the full match as Bengaluru drew the match 1–1.

=== Return to England ===
After three seasons in India, Osano returned to England, reportedly to sign with the Isthmian League, Hayes & Yeading United. However, on 28 July 2016 it was announced that he had signed instead for Farnborough.

== Later years ==
After his career with football, Osano turned to web development as a profession in 2016.

== Career statistics ==
As of 6 April 2016

Club statistics
| Club | Season | League | | | FA Cup | | League Cup | | Other | | Total | |
| Club | Season | Division | Apps | Goals | Apps | Goals | Apps | Goals | Apps | Goals | Apps | Goals |
|---|---|---|---|---|---|---|---|---|---|---|---|---|
| Reading | 2005–06 | Championship | 0 | 0 | 1 | 0 | 0 | 0 | 0 | 0 | 1 | 0 |
| Reading | 2006–07 | Premier League | 0 | 0 | 1 | 0 | 0 | 0 | 0 | 0 | 1 | 0 |
| Reading | Total | | 0 | 0 | 2 | 0 | 0 | 0 | 0 | 0 | 2 | 0 |
| Aldershot Town (loan) | 2006–07 | Conference | 10 | 0 | 0 | 0 | 0 | 0 | 0 | 0 | 10 | 0 |
| Aldershot Town (loan) | Total | | 10 | 0 | 0 | 0 | 0 | 0 | 0 | 0 | 10 | 0 |
| Woking (loan) | 2006–07 | Conference | 14 | 0 | 0 | 0 | 0 | 0 | 0 | 0 | 14 | 0 |
| Woking (loan) | Total | | 14 | 0 | 0 | 0 | 0 | 0 | 0 | 0 | 14 | 0 |
| Rushden & Diamonds (loan) | 2007–08 | Conference | 42 | 0 | 2 | 0 | 0 | 0 | 6 | 0 | 50 | 0 |
| Rushden & Diamonds | 2008–09 | Conference | 39 | 1 | 0 | 0 | 0 | 0 | 0 | 0 | 39 | 1 |
| Rushden & Diamonds | 2009–10 | Conference | 42 | 0 | 2 | 0 | 0 | 0 | 0 | 0 | 44 | 0 |
| Rushden & Diamonds | 2010–11 | Conference | 40 | 0 | 1 | 0 | 0 | 0 | 0 | 0 | 41 | 0 |
| Rushden & Diamonds | Total | | 163 | 1 | 5 | 0 | 0 | 0 | 6 | 0 | 174 | 1 |
| Luton Town | 2011–12 | Conference | 28 | 0 | 1 | 0 | 0 | 0 | 3 | 0 | 32 | 0 |
| Luton Town | Total | | 28 | 0 | 1 | 0 | 0 | 0 | 3 | 0 | 32 | 0 |
| AFC Wimbledon | 2012–13 | League Two | 17 | 0 | 3 | 0 | 0 | 0 | 0 | 0 | 20 | 0 |
| AFC Wimbledon | Total | | 17 | 0 | 3 | 0 | 0 | 0 | 0 | 0 | 20 | 0 |
| Bengaluru FC | 2013–14 | I-League | 22 | 0 | 3 | 0 | 0 | 0 | 0 | 0 | 25 | 0 |
| Bengaluru FC | 2014–15 | I-League | 19 | 1 | 5 | 0 | 0 | 0 | 6 | 0 | 30 | 1 |
| Bengaluru FC | 2015–16 | I-League | 13 | 1 | 0 | 0 | 0 | 0 | 0 | 0 | 13 | 1 |
| Bengaluru FC | Total | | 54 | 2 | 8 | 0 | 0 | 0 | 6 | 0 | 68 | 2 |
| Career total | | | 286 | 3 | 19 | 0 | 0 | 0 | 15 | 0 | 319 | 3 |

== Honours ==
=== Club ===
Bengaluru FC

- I-League: 2013–14, 2015–16
- Federation Cup: 2014–15
