= Jason Prior =

English footballer

Personal information
- Full name: Jason Christopher Prior
- Date of birth: 20 December 1988 (age 37)
- Place of birth: Portsmouth, England
- Position: Striker

Team information
- Current team: AFC Portchester

Senior career*
Years	Team	Apps	(Gls)
2005–2006	AFC Newbury		
2006–2009	Moneyfields		
2009–2012	Bognor Regis Town	126	(95)
2012–2013	AFC Wimbledon	9	(0)
2013	→ Dartford (loan)	9	(1)
2013–2014	Dartford	14	(1)
2014	→ Gosport Borough (loan)	9	(1)
2014–2015	Margate	11	(2)
2014–2015	→ Bognor Regis Town (loan)	28	(13)
2015–2016	Bognor Regis Town	43	(35)
2016–2018	Havant & Waterlooville	77	(40)
2018–2022	Dorking Wanderers	98	(40)
2022–2023	Havant & Waterlooville	21	(6)
2023–2026	Dorking Wanderers	127	(39)
2026–	AFC Portchester	0	(0)
- * Club domestic league appearances and goals as of 06:51, 31 May 2026 (UTC)

Jason Christopher Prior (born 20 December 1988) is an English footballer who plays for Isthmian League South Central Division club AFC Portchester.

He has previously featured for non-league sides Dorking Wanderers FC, AFC Newbury, Moneyfields, Bognor Regis Town, Dartford, Gosport Borough, Margate and Havant & Waterlooville. He made his Football League debut for AFC Wimbledon in January 2012.

== Club career ==
Starting as a central Midfielder, Prior began his career at Premier Division Wessex League club AFC Newbury. The club narrowly avoided relegation in the 2005–06 season and found themselves in financial difficulties in the close season when they lost the lease on their Town Ground stadium in Berkshire, and as a result, were demoted to Division One of the Wessex League. Prior subsequently left the club and signed for fellow Wessex League side Moneyfields. Here he was converted to the position of striker when it became apparent that he had a natural talent for scoring goals. In September 2009, Prior moved to Isthmian League Premier Division side Bognor Regis Town. It was here that he found the most prolific form of his career to date, scoring 95 goals in 126 appearances for the club. The striker was due to be sold to Conference South side Eastleigh for a fee of £12,000 in January 2012. However, before the deal could take place Prior was offered the opportunity of a trial at Premier League side Newcastle United. On 10 January 2012 Prior scored for Newcastle United Reserves' in a 3–1 win over Wigan Athletic Reserves in the 2011–12 Premier Reserve League. In spite of a successful three-week trial period however, the striker failed to win a contract with "The Magpies" and was subsequently released on 23 January 2012.

On 26 January 2012, Prior signed for League Two club AFC Wimbledon on a two-and-a-half-year contract. Prior made his football league debut for AFC Wimbledon on 28 January 2012 as a second-half substitute for George Moncur in a 2–1 defeat at home to Aldershot Town. The debut proved to be an ill-fated one for Prior, however, as he injured a tendon in his knee that side-lined him for nearly two months. Having recovered Prior made his first league start for AFC Wimbledon on 9 April 2012 in a 2–0 defeat away to Southend United. The next game against Crawley Town on 14 April 2012 heaped further injury woes on Prior however, as in the first six minutes he was on the receiving end of a wild lunge by Hope Akpan which resulted in Prior being stretchered off with a broken leg. AFC Wimbledon physiotherapist, Mike Rayner, confirmed later that day that an X-ray had shown that Prior had broken both his tibia and his fibula which would prevent him playing again for over nine months. After a long recuperation, Prior was finally able to make his return to league football on 29 December 2012, in a 3–0 defeat at home to Oxford United.

On 18 March 2013, it was announced that Prior had joined Conference side Dartford on a one-month loan to help improve his match fitness. On 14 May 2013, Prior was released from his contract and left AFC Wimbledon. On 18 March 2013, it was announced that Prior had joined Conference side Dartford on a one-month loan. Prior scored his first goal for Dartford in a 2–0 win over Telford United on 6 April 2013. Prior made nine appearances, scoring one goal, during the loan spell before returning to AFC Wimbledon. Following his release from "The Dons" on 14 May, Prior re-joined Dartford on a permanent deal on 15 July 2013.

For the 2014–15 season, Prior teamed up with his former AFC Wimbledon boss Terry Brown by signing a two-year deal with Margate. However, he found opportunities limited at Hartsdown Park, making just 14 appearances, and spent the majority of the season on loan at former club Bognor Regis Town. During the summer of 2015, he was released from his contract at Margate and returned to Bognor on a permanent basis for the 2015/16 season. Prior scored 40 goals in 52 games all competitions, in a season in which the Rocks reached the FA Trophy semi-final.

Over the following decade, Prior went on to play for both Havant & Waterlooville and Dorking Wanderers before rejoining the latter in February 2023 during their inaugural season in the National League. On 15 May 2026, it was announced that Prior would leave the club at the end of his contract in June.

On 30 May 2026, Prior agreed to join AFC Portchester following his departure from Dorking Wanderers.

== Career statistics ==
As of match played 2 May 2026

Appearances and goals by club, season and competition
Club	Season	League			FA Cup		EFL Cup		Other		Total	
Club	Season	Division	Apps	Goals	Apps	Goals	Apps	Goals	Apps	Goals	Apps	Goals
AFC Newbury	2005–06	Wessex League Division One	Season statistics not known									
Moneyfields	2006–07	Wessex League Premier Division	Season statistics not known									
Moneyfields	2007–08	Wessex League Premier Division	Season statistics not known									
Moneyfields	2008–09	Wessex League Premier Division	Season statistics not known									
Bognor Regis Town	2009–10	Isthmian League Premier Division	Season statistics not known									
Bognor Regis Town	2010–11	Isthmian League Division One South	Season statistics not known									
Bognor Regis Town	2011–12	Isthmian League Division One South	Season statistics not known									
AFC Wimbledon	2011–12	League Two	3	0	—		—		—		3	0
AFC Wimbledon	2012–13	League Two	6	0	0	0	0	0	0	0	6	0
AFC Wimbledon	Total		9	0	0	0	0	0	0	0	9	0
Dartford (loan)	2012–13	Conference Premier	9	1	—		—		—		9	1
Dartford	2013–14	Conference Premier	14	1	1	0	—		0	0	15	1
Gosport Borough (loan)	2013–14	Conference South	9	1	—		—		—		9	1
Margate	2014–15	Isthmian League Premier Division	11	2	2	0	—		1 (Note: Appearances in the Alan Turvey Trophy)	1	14	3
Bognor Regis Town (loan)	2014–15	Isthmian League Premier Division	28	13	—		—		0	0	28	13
Bognor Regis Town	2015–16	Isthmian League Premier Division	43	35	4	2	—		10 (Note: Nine appearances and three goals in the FA Trophy, one appearance in the Isthmian League Premier Division play-offs)	3	57	40
Havant & Waterlooville	2016–17	Isthmian League Premier Division	38	17	2	1	—		3 (Note: Appearances in the FA Trophy)	4	43	22
Havant & Waterlooville	2017–18	National League South	39	23	3	3	—		2	1	44	27
Havant & Waterlooville	Total		77	40	5	4	—		5	5	87	49
Dorking Wanderers	2018–19	Isthmian League Premier Division	37	21	3	3	—		4	3	44	27
Dorking Wanderers	2019–20	National League South	29	13	1	0	—		5 (Note: Three appearances and two goals in the FA Trophy, two appearances and one goal in the National League South play-offs)	3	35	16
Dorking Wanderers	2020–21	National League South	15	15	1	2	—		3	1	19	18
Dorking Wanderers	2021–22	National League South	17	8	2	0	—		4 (Note: Two appearances in the FA Trophy, two in the National League South play-offs)	0	23	8
Dorking Wanderers	Total		98	40	7	5	—		16	7	121	52
Havant & Waterlooville	2022–23	National League South	21	6	2	0	—		1	0	24	6
Dorking Wanderers	2022–23	National League	14	7	—		—		—		14	7
Dorking Wanderers	2023–24	National League	36	11	1	0	—		1	0	38	11
Dorking Wanderers	2024–25	National League South	40	13	1	0	—		2 (Note: One appearance in the FA Trophy, one appearance and one goal in the National League South play-offs)	1	43	14
Dorking Wanderers	2025–26	National League South	37	8	4	1	—		4 (Note: Two appearances in the FA Trophy, two in the National League South play-offs)	0	45	9
Dorking Wanderers	Total		127	39	6	1	—		7	1	140	41
AFC Portchester	2026–27	Isthmian League South Central Division	0	0	0	0	—		0	0	0	0
Career total			446	178	27	12	0	0	40	17	513	207
