= Jack Midson =

English footballer

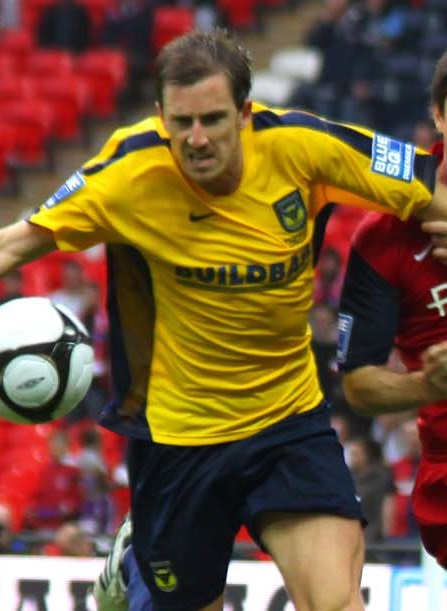
- Midson playing for Oxford United in the 2010 Conference Premier play-off final

Personal information
- Full name: Jack William Midson
- Date of birth: 12 September 1983 (age 43)
- Place of birth: Stevenage, England
- Position: Striker

Team information
- Current team: Lordswood

Senior career*
Years	Team	Apps	(Gls)
2001–2003	Stevenage Borough	10	(1)
2001	→ Harlow Town (loan)	8	(1)
2002	→ Hayes (loan)	14	(4)
2003	→ Hendon (loan)	7	(1)
2003–2004	→ Chelmsford City (loan)	3	(0)
2003–2004	Arlesey Town	37	(12)
2004–2005	Dagenham & Redbridge	11	(1)
2004–2005	→ Hemel Hempstead Town (loan)	12	(2)
2005–2008	Bishop's Stortford	88	(28)
2008–2009	Histon	65	(25)
2009–2011	Oxford United	56	(10)
2010	→ Southend United (loan)	4	(2)
2011	→ Barnet (loan)	5	(0)
2011–2014	AFC Wimbledon	126	(38)
2014–2016	Eastleigh	79	(11)
2016–2017	Braintree Town	39	(3)
2017–2018	Leatherhead	39	(15)
2018–2019	Concord Rangers	39	(16)
2019–2020	Hemel Hempstead Town	30	(4)
2020–2023	Sheppey United	46	(24)
2024–	Lordswood	1	(0)

Managerial career
- 2017–2018: Leatherhead (assistant manager)
- 2018–2019: Concord Rangers (assistant manager)
- 2019–2020: Hemel Hempstead Town (assistant manager)
- 2022–2023: Sheppey United (player-manager)
- * Club domestic league appearances and goals as of 12:04, 4 April 2024 (UTC)

Jack William Midson (born 12 September 1983) is an English semi-professional footballer who plays as a forward for Southern Counties East League Division One club Lordswood.

Midson was the 2011–12 League Two joint top scorer, along with Izale McLeod, Lewis Grabban and Adebayo Akinfenwa, with 18 goals and scored 20 goals in all competitions during the 2011–12 season for AFC Wimbledon, finishing the season as their top scorer. He was AFC Wimbledon's top scorer the following season as well, scoring 15 goals in all competitions and 13 in the league.

== Career ==
=== Semi-professional ===
Midson was born in Stevenage, Hertfordshire. He was a tennis and football coach in Cambridgeshire and Enfield as well as a semi-professional footballer. He started his career at Stevenage Borough before spells at Dagenham & Redbridge, Chelmsford City and Bishop's Stortford before a successful one-and-a-half-year spell at Histon, where he scored 20 goals in the 2008–09 season. He also taught PE lessons at Capel Manor Primary School and others as part of a fitness organisation course.

=== Professional ===
==== Oxford United ====
After disappointment in the 2008–09 Conference play-off semi-final, Midson left Histon after firm interest from Oxford United. He joined Oxford on 16 May 2009 on a two-year professional contract. Midson featured regularly as Oxford gained promotion to the Football League after four years in the Conference Premier, and started in the 2009–10 Conference play-off final at Wembley Stadium.

On 5 November 2010, he joined Southend United on a brief loan. Following his return to Oxford, Midson scored his first career hat-trick against Torquay United on 3 January 2011. Midson joined Barnet on loan in March 2011, making his debut by coming off the bench in a 1–0 defeat at Aldershot Town.

==== AFC Wimbledon ====
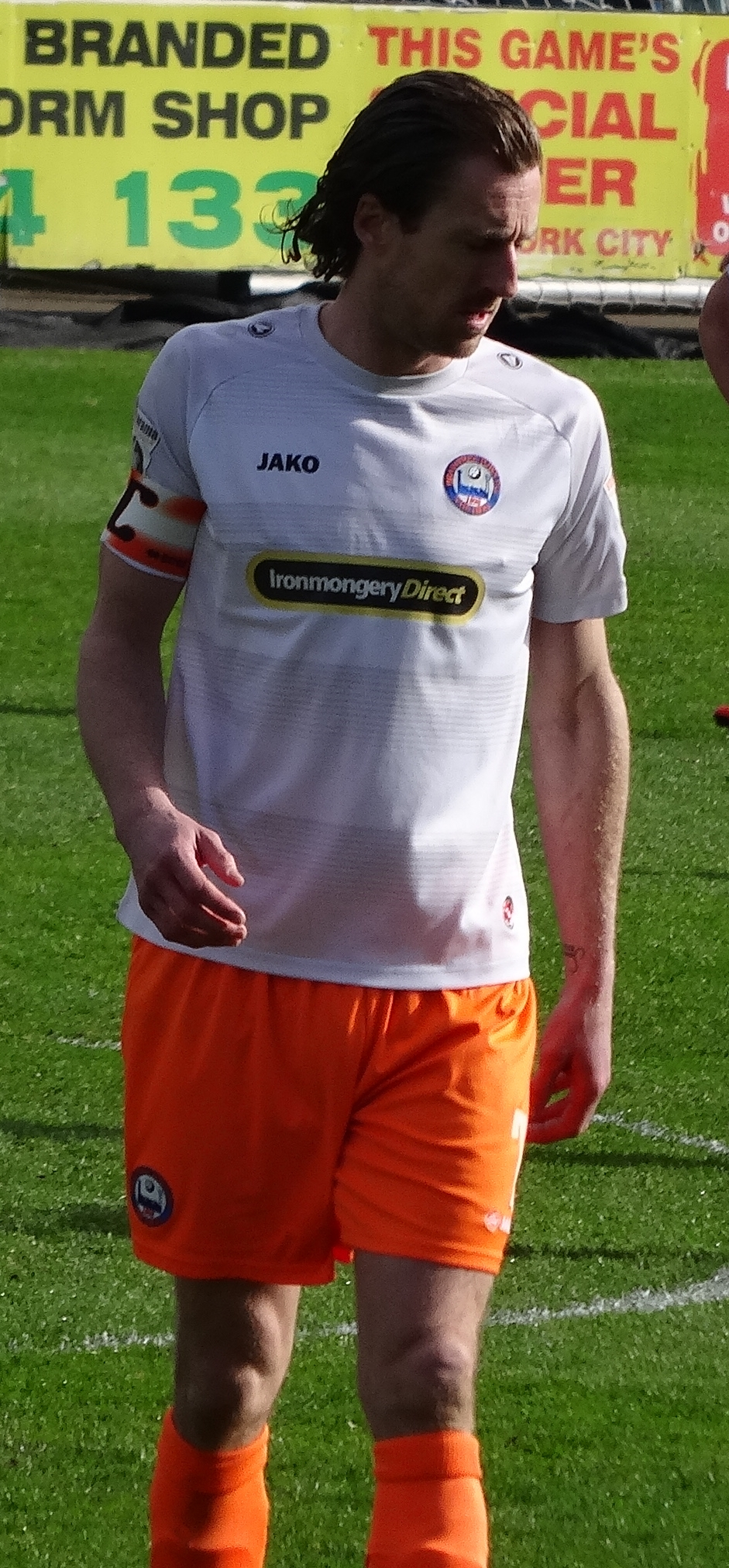
Midson playing for Braintree Town in 2017

In June 2011, Midson signed for AFC Wimbledon. On 9 July 2011, he made his debut in a 2–0 pre-season friendly win against a Fulham XI. He scored his first goals for AFC Wimbledon three days later, a brace in a 5–1 away friendly victory against Staines Town. He made his competitive debut in AFC Wimbledon's Football League debut, a 3–2 home defeat to Bristol Rovers. He finished the 2011–12 season as AFC Wimbledon's top scorer with 20 goals in all competitions. He also finished the season as joint-top scorer in League Two with 18 league goals in total. In June 2012, AFC Wimbledon rejected a six-figure bid for Midson from Rotherham United, and he signed an improved contract with The Dons later that month. On 2 December 2012, Midson scored for AFC Wimbledon in their first ever meeting with Milton Keynes Dons. AFC Wimbledon went on to lose the match 2–1 however. After a rather inconsistent goal scoring start to the 2012–13 League Two season, Midson hit consistent goal scoring form towards the end of the season to help lift AFC Wimbledon away from the League Two relegation zone. He passed the double figure mark for a second consecutive season after scoring the only goal with a superb chip in a vital relegation 6 pointer against Aldershot Town on 16 March 2013. He then scored the winner in a 2–1 victory over Fleetwood Town which meant that AFC Wimbledon avoided relegation on the last day of the season. Midson finished his second season with AFC Wimbledon once again as the club's top scorer, having scored 15 goals in all competitions and 13 in the league to help The Dons avoid relegation from the football league and secure a third successive season in League Two.

==== Eastleigh ====
Midson signed for Eastleigh in May 2014 after being released from AFC Wimbledon. He was released at the end of the 2015–16 season.

==== Braintree Town ====
Midson signed for Braintree Town in June 2016.

==== Lordswood ====
In March 2024, Midson joined Southern Counties East Premier Division club Lordswood.

== Coaching career ==
In May 2017, Midson was signed for Leatherhead by manager Sammy Moore, a former team-mate at AFC Wimbledon, to take up a player-assistant manager role at Leatherhead.

On 2 May 2018, Midson was appointed assistant manager alongside Sammy Moore at National League South club Concord Rangers. At the end of the 2018–19 season, Midson left Concord, following Moore's departure, after the club were denied entry to the play-offs due to ground grading issues.

In May 2019, Midson joined Moore as player-assistant manager at Hemel Hempstead Town. On 20 May 2020, Midson parted company with Hemel Hempstead Town following a year at the club.

In August 2022, with manager Ernie Batten moving up to the role of Director of Football, Midson was appointed player-manager at Sheppey United ahead of their first season in the Isthmian League following promotion, the club he had been at since 2020. He departed the club in July 2023.

== Career statistics ==
As of end of 2022–23 season.

Appearances and goals by club, season and competition
Club	Season	League			FA Cup		League Cup		Other		Total	
Club	Season	Division	Apps	Goals	Apps	Goals	Apps	Goals	Apps	Goals	Apps	Goals
Stevenage Borough	2001–02	Football Conference	4	0	0	0	—		0	0	4	0
Stevenage Borough	2002–03	Football Conference	6	1	2	0	—		1 (Note: Appearance(s) in Football League Trophy)	0	9	1
Stevenage Borough	Total		10	1	2	0	—		1	0	13	1
Harlow Town (loan)	2001–02	Isthmian League First Division	8	1	0	0	—		0	0	8	1
Hayes (loan)	2002–03	Isthmian League Premier Division	14	4	0	0	—		0	0	14	4
Hendon (loan)	2002–03	Isthmian League Premier Division	7	1	0	0	—		0	0	7	1
Chelmsford City (loan)	2002–03	Southern League Premier Division	3	0	0	0	—		0	0	3	0
Arlesey Town	2003–04	Isthmian League Division One North	37	12	0	0	—		0	0	37	12
Dagenham & Redbridge	2004–05	Conference National	11	1	0	0	—		0	0	11	1
Hemel Hempstead Town (loan)	2004–05	Southern League Premier Division	12	2	0	0	—		0	0	12	2
Bishop's Stortford	2005–06	Conference South	37	13	0	0	—		0	0	37	13
Bishop's Stortford	2006–07	Conference South	30	12	1	0	—		0	0	31	12
Bishop's Stortford	2007–08	Conference South	21	3	0	0	—		0	0	21	3
Bishop's Stortford	Total		88	28	1	0	—		0	0	89	28
Histon	2007–08	Conference Premier	19	5	0	0	—		0	0	19	5
Histon	2008–09	Conference Premier	46	20	2	0	—		3 (Note: One appearance in FA Trophy, two in Conference Premier Play-offs)	0	51	20
Histon	Total		65	25	2	0	—		3	0	71	25
Oxford United	2009–10	Conference Premier	35	4	4	1	—		6 (Note: Three appearances and three goals in FA Trophy, three appearances in Conference Premier Play-offs)	3	45	8
Oxford United	2010–11	League Two	21	6	0	0	1	1	1	0	23	7
Oxford United	Total		56	10	4	1	1	1	7	3	68	15
Southend United (loan)	2010–11	League Two	4	2	2	0	0	0	0	0	6	2
Barnet (loan)	2010–11	League Two	5	0	0	0	0	0	0	0	5	0
AFC Wimbledon	2011–12	League Two	46	18	3	1	1	1	2	0	52	20
AFC Wimbledon	2012–13	League Two	43	13	3	2	1	0	1	0	48	15
AFC Wimbledon	2013–14	League Two	37	7	1	0	1	0	1	0	40	7
AFC Wimbledon	Total		126	38	7	3	3	1	4	0	140	42
Eastleigh	2014–15	Conference Premier	41	11	0	0	—		2 (Note: One appearance in FA Trophy, one in Conference Premier Play-offs)	0	43	11
Eastleigh	2015–16	National League	38	0	3	0	—		1 (Note: Appearance(s) in FA Trophy)	0	42	0
Eastleigh	Total		79	11	3	0	—		3	0	85	11
Braintree Town	2016–17	National League	39	3	3	1	—		4	3	46	7
Leatherhead	2017–18	Isthmian League Premier Division	39	15	7	12	—		1	1	47	28
Concord Rangers	2018–19	National League South	39	16	3	2	—		1	0	43	18
Hemel Hempstead Town	2019–20	National League South	30	4	0	0	—		1	0	31	4
Sheppey United	2020–21	Southern Counties East Premier Division	10	5	5	3	—		2 (Note: Appearance(s) in FA Vase)	2	17	10
Sheppey United	2021–22	Southern Counties East Premier Division	12	14	1	0	—		3	1	16	15
Sheppey United	2022–23	Isthmian League South East Division	24	5	1	0	—		2 (Note: One appearance and one goal in FA Trophy, one appearance and one goal in Alan Turvey Trophy)	2	27	7
Sheppey United	Total		46	24	7	3	—		7	5	60	32
Career total			718	197	41	22	4	2	32	12	795	233

== Honours ==
Oxford United

- Conference Premier play-offs: 2010

Sheppey United

- SCEFL Premier Division: 2021–22

Individual

- AFC Wimbledon Player of the Year: 2012–13
