= Byron Harrison =

English footballer

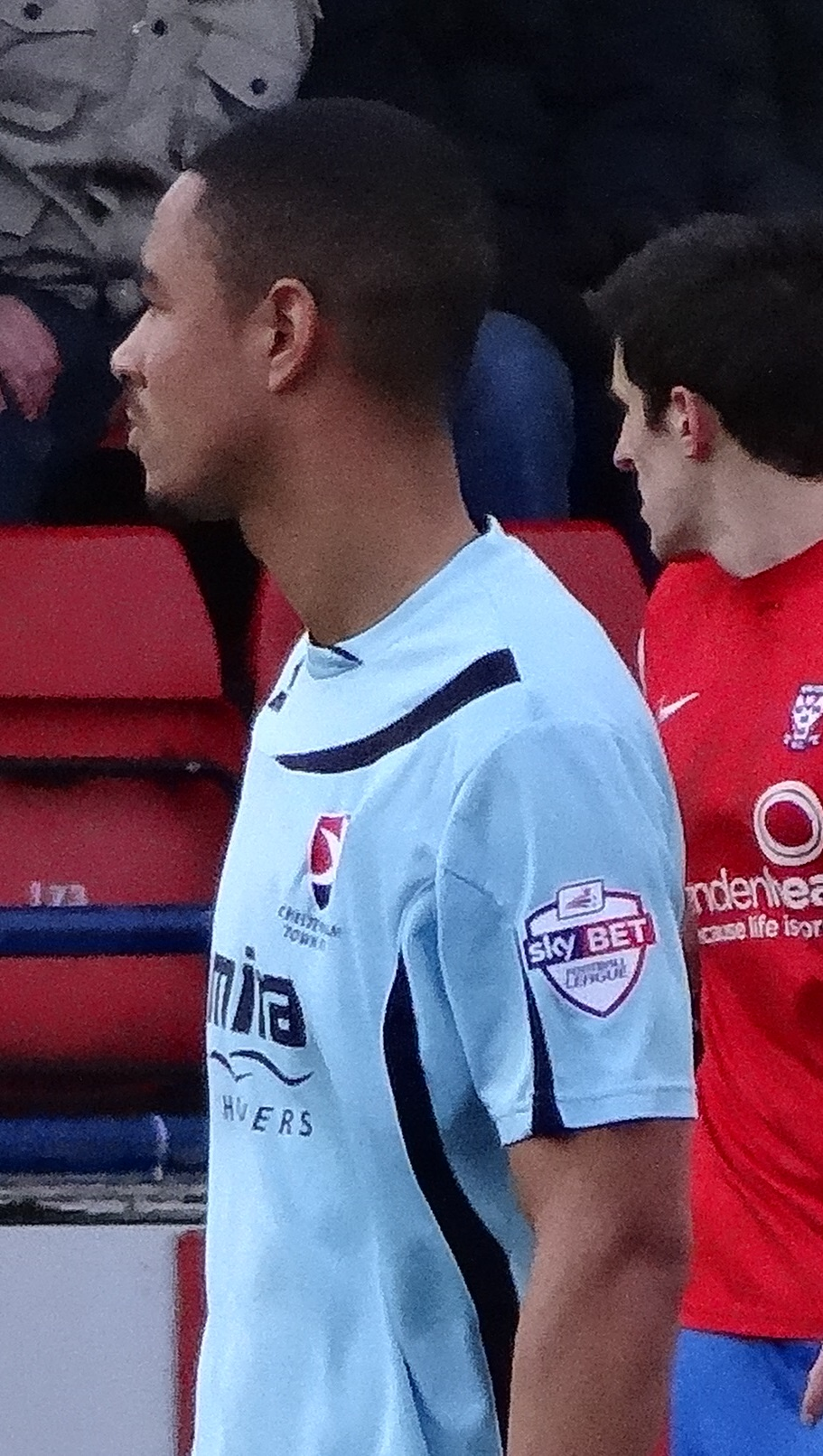
- Harrison playing for Cheltenham Town in 2014

Personal information
- Full name: Byron Junior Harrison
- Date of birth: 15 June 1987 (age 39)
- Place of birth: Wandsworth, London, England
- Height: 6 ft 3 in (1.91 m)
- Position: Striker

Team information
- Current team: Kidsgrove Athletic

Senior career*
Years	Team	Apps	(Gls)
2005–2006	Havant & Waterlooville	20	(0)
2006	Worthing	9	(2)
2006–2007	Boreham Wood	29	(13)
2007	Harrow Borough	5	(1)
2008–2010	Ashford Town (Middlesex)	89	(43)
2010–2011	Carshalton Athletic	30	(12)
2011–2012	Stevenage	38	(10)
2012–2013	AFC Wimbledon	40	(10)
2013–2015	Cheltenham Town	86	(18)
2015–2016	Chesterfield	15	(1)
2016	→ Stevenage (loan)	9	(3)
2016–2018	Barrow	56	(27)
2018	→ Sutton United (loan)	13	(4)
2018–2019	Barnet	20	(1)
2019–2020	Barrow	29	(0)
2020–2021	Altrincham	8	(0)
2021–2022	Connah's Quay Nomads	21	(6)
2022	Boston United	2	(0)
2022	Altrincham	1	(0)
2022–2026	Nantwich Town	146	(52)
2026–	Kidsgrove Athletic	0	(0)
- * Club domestic league appearances and goals as of 13:48, 21 August 2026 (UTC)

Byron Junior Harrison (born 15 June 1987) is an English professional footballer who plays as a striker for Northern Premier League Division One West club Kidsgrove Athletic.

Harrison began his career at Havant & Waterlooville, making his senior debut in October 2005, before signing for Worthing of the Isthmian League Premier Division in July 2006. He joined divisional rivals Boreham Wood in October of that year, but was released a year later. After a brief spell at Harrow Borough, he signed for Ashford Town (Middlesex) in January 2008, where he scored 53 goals in 93 appearances over two and a half seasons. He left Ashford in February 2010, and signed for Carshalton Athletic. Harrison scored 14 goals during the first half of the 2010–11 season, before joining League Two club Stevenage in January 2011. He finished the season as the club's joint-top goalscorer, helping Stevenage secure promotion to League One via the play-offs in their first season in the Football League.

In January 2012, Harrison signed for League Two club AFC Wimbledon for a club-record fee, before joining Cheltenham Town a year later. He scored 23 goals in 96 appearances for Cheltenham and was named their Player of the Year for the 2013–14 season. He later played for Chesterfield and spent time on loan at Stevenage, before signing permanently for Barrow in 2016. After two years, he joined fellow National League club Barnet, where he spent one season, before returning to Barrow for the 2019–20 season, helping the club win the National League title and secure promotion to League Two. He subsequently had spells at Altrincham, Connah's Quay Nomads, Boston United, and a second stint at Altrincham, before signing for Nantwich Town in October 2022. After scoring 59 goals in 175 appearances for Nantwich, Harrison joined divisional rivals Kidsgrove Athletic in July 2026.

== Early life ==
Born in Wandsworth, London, Harrison grew up in Clapham. He began playing football as a centre-back for his school team, and was later invited for a two-week trial at Chelsea's youth academy, where he spent several months. A boyhood Arsenal fan, he cited Ian Wright and Thierry Henry as players he aspired to emulate.

== Career ==
=== Early career ===
Harrison began his career with Conference South club Havant & Waterlooville in 2005, having been recommended to the club by former player Darren Annon. He made his debut in October 2005, coming on as a 70th-minute substitute in an away match against Farnborough Town. A week later, he scored his first professional goal in an FA Cup tie against Cirencester Town. He departed the club at the end of the 2005–06 season, having made 23 appearances, 22 of which were from the substitutes' bench. Havant indicated Harrison would be welcome to return to the club after gaining further first-team experience.

Ahead of the 2006–07 season, Harrison signed for Worthing of the Isthmian League Premier Division, where he scored four goals in 11 appearances. He left Worthing in November, and subsequently joined divisional rivals Boreham Wood. Harrison made his Boreham Wood debut in December 2006, coming on as a substitute in a 4–1 victory away to Folkestone Invicta. A leg injury in January 2007 sidelined him for six weeks, but upon his return on 3 March, he scored a hat-trick against former club Worthing in a 3–2 win at Meadow Park. Harrison finished the season having scored 13 goals in 21 appearances.

Having failed to score in the opening month of the 2007–08 season, during which he was omitted from the starting line-up, Cook noted Harrison appeared "a little subdued" but did not anticipate his absence from the starting line-up to be prolonged. Despite making several further starts, Harrison was released by the club on 30 October 2007.

=== Ashford Town (Middlesex) ===
Following a short spell at Harrow Borough, during which he scored once in five appearances, Harrison signed for Ashford Town (Middlesex) in January 2008. He scored his first goal for the club the following month, the match-winner in a 2–1 victory over former club Boreham Wood. During the first half of the 2009–10 season, Harrison scored 19 goals. Southend United invited him for a trial in February 2010, during which he featured in a reserve match against Colchester United, though he did not secure a contract. Had the move materialised, Ashford would have been entitled to a £20,000 compensation fee. A week after his trial, Harrison left Ashford, with manager Jamie Lawrence stating he could no longer afford to continue playing for the club. He subsequently had an unsuccessful trial with Premier League club Wolverhampton Wanderers, and attracted interest from Conference South club Staines Town, who had previously attempted to sign him on two occasions. During his two-year spell at Ashford, Harrison scored 53 goals in all competitions.

=== Carshalton Athletic ===
In March 2010, Harrison signed for Isthmian League Premier Division club Carshalton Athletic. Manager Mark Butler stated Harrison had been a primary transfer target and expressed confidence in his ability to score goals for the club. He made his debut in a 0–0 home draw against Hendon. On the final day of the season, Harrison scored a hat-trick in a 4–1 away win over Wealdstone, a result that ensured Carshalton's survival and, in turn, relegated his former club Ashford. During the first half of the 2010–11 season, Harrison scored back-to-back hat-tricks in the FA Cup against East Thurrock United and Braintree Town, and went on to score 14 goals in 25 appearances.

=== Stevenage ===
Harrison signed for League Two club Stevenage on a free transfer on 1 January 2011. As part of the agreement, Stevenage played in a pre-season friendly at Carshalton in July 2011. Harrison made his debut later that day, starting in Stevenage's 1–0 away defeat to Gillingham. He scored his first goal for the club on 25 January 2011, three minutes after coming on as a substitute in a 3–0 home win against Rotherham United. Harrison finished the 2010–11 season as joint-top goalscorer with eight goals in 23 appearances, including three substitute appearances in the League Two play-offs. He featured as a 62nd-minute substitute in Stevenage's 1–0 victory over Torquay United in the final at Old Trafford on 28 May 2011, securing promotion to League One. During the first half of the 2011–12 season, he scored twice in 23 appearances. In total, Harrison made 46 appearances and scored ten goals for Stevenage across all competitions.

=== AFC Wimbledon ===
Harrison signed for League Two club AFC Wimbledon on 10 January 2012, becoming the club's record signing for an undisclosed five-figure fee exceeding the £25,000 previously paid for Jon Main. He made his debut for the club in a 2–1 away victory at Port Vale on 14 January. Manager Terry Brown noted it had taken Harrison time to adapt to Wimbledon's style of play, which contributed to him not scoring in his first two months at the club, although he praised his overall performances. After scoring his first goals for the club in a London Senior Cup match against Metropolitan Police, he registered his first league goal on his 13th appearance, as a substitute in a 4–0 victory against Burton Albion on 24 March 2012. He scored two goals in 19 appearances for the club during the second half of the season.

Harrison scored nine goals in 26 appearances during the first half of the 2012–13 season, including four goals in consecutive matches through October 2012. During his one-year spell with the club, he made 45 appearances and scored 11 goals in all competitions.

=== Cheltenham Town ===
Harrison signed for League Two club Cheltenham Town on 31 January 2013 for an undisclosed fee, agreeing a two-and-a-half-year contract. Cheltenham manager Mark Yates stated he had previously attempted to sign Harrison on multiple occasions, including prior to the 2012–13 season. The opening months of his Cheltenham career were disrupted by a back injury, limiting him to mostly substitute appearances. He scored his first goal for Cheltenham in his ninth appearance, heading in a stoppage time consolation in a 3–1 away defeat to Burton Albion on 9 March 2013. Harrison scored once in 19 appearances that season, as Cheltenham were defeated by Northampton Town in the play-off semi-finals.

In April 2014, Yates praised Harrison for the manner in which he responded to a disagreement between the pair during a post-match review of Cheltenham's 4–1 defeat to Chesterfield. Harrison subsequently scored four goals in the next 10 matches. He finished the 2013–14 season as the club's top goalscorer and was also named Cheltenham's Player of the Year at the end-of-season awards ceremony.

=== Chesterfield ===
Having scored seven goals in 27 appearances for Cheltenham during the first half of the 2014–15 season, Harrison was made available for loan or permanent transfer on 9 January 2015. Manager Paul Buckle stated the decision was influenced by a change in the team's playing style, moving away from a target man to two smaller strikers. He subsequently signed for League One club Chesterfield for an undisclosed fee on 27 January 2015. Chesterfield manager Paul Cook stated that the club had monitored Harrison for some time and believed he would strengthen the squad. He featured primarily as a substitute during his time at Chesterfield, scoring his only goal for the club in a 1–0 away victory over Bradford City on 31 March 2015.

Limited to three substitute appearances during the first half of the 2015–16 season with Chesterfield, Harrison returned to former club Stevenage on a one-month loan agreement on 11 February 2016. He scored twice on his first appearance back at the club, in a 2–0 victory against Cambridge United at Broadhall Way. The loan was extended in March 2016 until the end of the season, with Harrison making nine appearances and scoring three goals. He was released by Chesterfield upon the expiry of his contract at the end of the season.

=== Barrow ===
Following his release from Chesterfield, Harrison signed for National League club Barrow on 24 July 2016. He scored his first goal for the club in a 2–1 home victory against Braintree Town on 27 August 2016. Between October and December 2016, Harrison scored 14 goals in 11 matches, including a hat-trick and three braces. He sustained an ankle injury during the club's 3–0 victory over Lincoln City on 24 January 2017, ruling him out for three months. He returned for Barrow's final two matches and finished the season as the club's top goalscorer, with 22 goals in 38 appearances.

Harrison missed the opening month of the 2017–18 season due to the ankle injury sustained during the previous season. After being informed that his playing time at Barrow would be limited, he joined fellow National League club Sutton United on loan for the remainder of the season in February 2018. He scored four goals in 14 appearances as Sutton were defeated by Boreham Wood in the play-off qualifying round. He left Barrow following the expiry of his contract in June 2018.

=== Barnet ===
Harrison signed for National League club Barnet on 27 July 2018. Manager John Still described Harrison as his primary transfer target and a direct replacement for departing forward John Akinde, with Harrison citing Still's interest as a key factor in his decision to join the club. He scored two goals in 25 appearances during his one season at Barnet, including the winning goal in a late comeback victory against League One club Bristol Rovers in the FA Cup first round. He was one of eight players released at the end of the season.

=== Return to Barrow ===
Ahead of the 2019–20 season, Harrison trialled with former club Barrow after asking manager Ian Evatt, his former teammate at Chesterfield, for permission to train with the team during pre-season. He officially rejoined on 23 July 2019, signing a one-year contract with an option for a further year. Primarily used as a substitute, Harrison started five of his 29 league appearances as Barrow won the National League title and secured promotion to the Football League. He scored once during his year back at Barrow, in a 7–0 FA Trophy victory over FC United of Manchester, making 33 appearances in all competitions. Harrison was released following the conclusion of his contract in July 2020.

=== Further spells ===
Without a club during the opening months of the 2020–21 season, Harrison signed a short-term contract with National League club Altrincham on 5 December 2020. Upon his arrival, the club noted he was recovering from a minor calf injury. He made eight appearances during a three-month spell before departing in March 2021. Harrison subsequently signed for Cymru Premier club Connah's Quay Nomads on 11 August 2021, with manager Andy Morrison stating the club had beaten competition from a National League team, a National League North team and a club from abroad to sign him. He scored nine goals in 25 appearances in all competitions during the 2021–22 season, leaving the club in May 2022 following the expiry of his one-year contract.

Harrison joined Boston United of the National League North on 3 September 2022, but departed two weeks later having made two appearances. Later that month, following a period training with the club, he returned to Altrincham on a short-term deal to provide cover amid international call-ups and injuries.

=== Nantwich Town ===
After making one substitute appearance for Altrincham, Harrison signed for Northern Premier League club Nantwich Town on a dual-registration basis on 28 October 2022. He scored eight goals in 29 appearances during the remainder of the 2022–23 season. In the 2023–24 season, he scored 20 goals and provided four assists in 47 appearances, finishing as the club's top goalscorer and winning four end-of-season awards, including the Player of the Year. Amid interest from other clubs, he signed a one-year contract extension in June 2024, with manager Paul Carden praising his reliability, fitness and attitude. He scored 13 goals in 45 appearances during the 2024–25 season, before signing a further one-year contract extension in June 2025.

Harrison scored after 8.8 seconds in Nantwich's 1–1 FA Cup draw with Avro on 30 August 2025, recording the fastest goal in the club's history. He scored 18 goals in 50 appearances during the 2025–26 season. In total, Harrison scored 59 goals and provided 27 assists in 175 appearances for Nantwich.

=== Kidsgrove Athletic ===
After declining a new contract at Nantwich, Harrison joined fellow Northern Premier League Division One West club Kidsgrove Athletic on 24 July 2026.

== Style of play ==
Deployed solely as a striker throughout his career, Harrison has primarily been utilised as a target man. Upon joining Cheltenham, he described his playing style as "laid-back and athletic", noting a preference for receiving the ball to feet despite often being perceived as being stronger aerially due to his height and build. Manager Ian Evatt praised his hold-up play, link-up ability, and first touch.

== Career statistics ==
As of end of 2025–26 season

Appearances and goals by club, season and competition
Club	Season	Division	League		National cup (Note: Includes FA Cup, Welsh Cup)		League cup (Note: Includes EFL Cup, Welsh League Cup)		Other		Total	
Club	Season	Division	Apps	Goals	Apps	Goals	Apps	Goals	Apps	Goals	Apps	Goals
Havant & Waterlooville	2005–06	Conference South	20	0	1	1	—		2 (Note: One appearance and one goal in FA Trophy; one appearance in Hampshire Senior Cup)	1	23	2
Worthing	2006–07	Isthmian League Premier	9	2	1	0	—		1	2	11	4
Boreham Wood	2006–07	Isthmian League Premier	21	13	—		—		0	0	21	13
Boreham Wood	2007–08	Isthmian League Premier	8	0	1	0	—		1	0	10	0
Boreham Wood	Total		29	13	1	0	0	0	1	0	31	13
Harrow Borough	2007–08	Isthmian League Premier	5	1	—		—		0	0	5	1
Ashford Town (Middlesex)	2007–08	Isthmian League Premier	17	5	—		—		0	0	17	5
Ashford Town (Middlesex)	2008–09	Isthmian League Premier	40	22	4	4	—		2	3	46	29
Ashford Town (Middlesex)	2009–10	Isthmian League Premier	32	16	2	1	—		2	2	36	19
Ashford Town (Middlesex)	Total		89	43	6	5	0	0	4	5	99	53
Carshalton Athletic	2009–10	Isthmian League Premier	12	5	0	0	—		0	0	12	5
Carshalton Athletic	2010–11	Isthmian League Premier	18	7	6	7	—		1	0	25	14
Carshalton Athletic	Total		30	12	6	7	0	0	1	0	37	19
Stevenage	2010–11	League Two	20	8	—		—		3 (Note: Appearances in 2011 League Two play-offs)	0	23	8
Stevenage	2011–12	League One	18	2	3	0	1	0	1 (Note: Appearance in Football League Trophy)	0	23	2
Stevenage	Total		38	10	3	0	1	0	4	0	46	10
AFC Wimbledon	2011–12	League Two	19	2	—		—		—		19	2
AFC Wimbledon	2012–13	League Two	21	8	3	1	1	0	1	0	26	9
AFC Wimbledon	Total		40	10	3	1	1	0	1	0	45	11
Cheltenham Town	2012–13	League Two	17	1	—		—		2 (Note: Appearances in 2013 League Two play-offs)	0	19	1
Cheltenham Town	2013–14	League Two	46	13	1	0	2	2	1	0	50	15
Cheltenham Town	2014–15	League Two	23	4	2	3	1	0	1	0	27	7
Cheltenham Town	Total		86	18	3	3	3	2	4	0	96	23
Chesterfield	2014–15	League One	12	1	—		—		—		12	1
Chesterfield	2015–16	League One	3	0	0	0	0	0	0	0	3	0
Chesterfield	Total		15	1	0	0	0	0	0	0	15	1
Stevenage (loan)	2015–16	League Two	9	3	—		—		—		9	3
Barrow	2016–17	National League	30	19	5	3	—		3 (Note: Appearance(s) in FA Trophy)	0	38	22
Barrow	2017–18	National League	26	8	1	1	—		2	1	29	10
Barrow	Total		56	27	6	4	0	0	5	1	67	32
Sutton United (loan)	2017–18	National League	13	4	—		—		1 (Note: Appearance in 2018 National League play-offs)	0	14	4
Barnet	2018–19	National League	20	1	4	1	—		1	0	25	2
Barrow	2019–20	National League	29	0	0	0	—		4	1	33	1
Altrincham	2020–21	National League	8	0	0	0	—		0	0	8	0
Connah's Quay Nomads	2021–22	Cymru Premier	21	6	2	1	2	2	0	0	25	9
Boston United	2022–23	National League North	2	0	0	0	—		0	0	2	0
Altrincham	2022–23	National League	1	0	0	0	—		0	0	1	0
Nantwich Town	2022–23	NPL Premier Division	27	7	0	0	—		2 (Note: Appearance(s) in Cheshire Senior Cup)	1	29	8
Nantwich Town	2023–24	NPL Division One West	35	17	4	3	—		8 (Note: One appearance in Cheshire Senior Cup; seven appearances in FA Trophy)	0	47	20
Nantwich Town	2024–25	NPL Division One West	42	12	1	1	—		2	0	45	13
Nantwich Town	2025–26	NPL Division One West	42	16	5	2	—		3 (Note: One appearance in Cheshire Senior Cup; two appearances in FA Trophy)	0	50	18
Nantwich Town	Total		146	52	10	6	0	0	15	1	171	59
Kidsgrove Athletic	2026–27	NPL Division One West	0	0	0	0	—		0	0	0	0
Career totals			666	203	46	29	7	4	44	11	763	247

== Honours ==
Stevenage

- Football League Two play-offs: 2011

Barrow

- National League: 2019–20

Individual

- Cheltenham Town Player of the Year: 2013–14
- Nantwich Town Player of the Year: 2023–24
