= Kevin Sainte-Luce =

Footballer (born 1993)

Personal information
- Date of birth: 28 April 1993 (age 33)
- Place of birth: Paris, France
- Height: 1.78 m (5 ft 10 in)
- Position: Winger

Youth career
- 2010–2012: Cardiff City

Senior career*
| Years | Team | Apps | (Gls) |
| 2012–2013 | Cardiff City | 0 | (0) |
| 2013–2015 | AFC Wimbledon | 46 | (3) |
| 2015 | Gateshead | 13 | (3) |
| 2015–2016 | Dieppe | 21 | (6) |
| 2016–2019 | Créteil | 39 | (2) |
| 2018–2019 | Fleury 91 | 4 | (0) |
| 2019–2020 | Rouen | 4 | (0) |
| 2020 | AG Caennaise | 1 | (0) |

International career^{‡}
| 2012–2013 | Guadeloupe U20 | 9 | (2) |
| 2016– | Guadeloupe | 4 | (0) |
- * Club domestic league appearances and goals as of 00:02, 7 July 2019 (UTC) ‡ National team caps and goals as of 1 June 2016

Kevin Sainte-Luce (born 28 April 1993) is a professional footballer who plays as a winger. Born in Metropolitan France, he plays for the Guadeloupe national team at international level.

== Career ==
=== Early years ===
Born in Paris, France, Sainte-Luce moved to Wales as a teenager and worked his way through the Cardiff City Academy under the stewardship of the Head of Academy Neal Ardley. The winger made his debut for the senior team on 14 August 2012, in a 2–1 defeat to Northampton Town in the first round of the Football League Cup. However, despite showing promise for "The Bluebirds" the 19-year–old had his contract terminated on 29 January 2013 following an incident in which he was found guilty of assaulting two girls in a Cardiff nightclub. Sainte-Luce avoided a six–month prison sentence but was ordered to pay £1,250 compensation to the girls, given a 180-hour community service order and handed a 10–week 8pm–6am curfew for the unprovoked attack.

=== AFC Wimbledon ===
In spite of his run–in with the law, AFC Wimbledon manager Neal Ardley decided to offer the young winger a chance to prove himself, signing him on a six–month contract with the option of a further year on 31 January 2013. Sainte-Luce made his Football League debut in a 2–1 win over Bradford City on 16 February 2013 as a 64th minute substitute for Rashid Yussuff. Ardley's faith in him was soon repaid as on 23 February 2013, Sainte-Luce scored his first Football League goal for "The Dons" in a 1–0 win over Dagenham & Redbridge. The 19-year–old winger scored his second goal for the club in a 2–0 win over Morecambe on 23 March 2013. On 25 June 2013, it was announced that manager Neal Ardley had taken up the option of a one-year extension on the 20-year–old winger's contract, retaining him at The Cherry Red Records Stadium for the 2013–14 season. On 7 January 2015, his contract was terminated by mutual consent due to a lack of first team action.

=== Gateshead ===
Sainte-Luce signed a short-term, six-month deal with Conference Premier side Gateshead on 15 January. Sainte-Luce made his Gateshead debut two days later in their 2–0 win at Nuneaton Town. He scored his first goals for Gateshead in their 2–2 draw at Grimsby Town on 4 April. However, he was not offered a new deal at the end of the season and left the club in June.

=== FC Dieppe ===
It was announced on 11 August 2015 that Sainte-Luce had signed for FC Dieppe.

=== Creteil ===
Saint-Luce joined Creteil for the 2016–17 season.

=== Rouen ===
On 14 June 2019, Sainte-Luce joined FC Rouen.

== Career statistics ==
As of 30 August 2015

Appearances and goals by club, season and competition
| Season | Club | League | | | FA Cup | | League Cup | | Other (Note: Includes Football League Trophy and FA Trophy.) | | Total | |
| Season | Club | Division | Apps | Goals | Apps | Goals | Apps | Goals | Apps | Goals | Apps | Goals |
|---|---|---|---|---|---|---|---|---|---|---|---|---|
| Cardiff City | 2012–13 | Championship | 0 | 0 | 0 | 0 | 1 | 0 | 0 | 0 | 1 | 0 |
| AFC Wimbledon | 2012–13 | League Two | 14 | 2 | 0 | 0 | 0 | 0 | 0 | 0 | 14 | 2 |
| AFC Wimbledon | 2013–14 | League Two | 23 | 1 | 0 | 0 | 0 | 0 | 1 | 0 | 24 | 1 |
| AFC Wimbledon | 2014–15 | League Two | 9 | 0 | 0 | 0 | 1 | 0 | 1 | 0 | 11 | 0 |
| Gateshead | 2014–15 | Conference Premier | 13 | 3 | 0 | 0 | 0 | 0 | 1 | 0 | 14 | 3 |
| Career total | | | 59 | 6 | 0 | 0 | 2 | 0 | 3 | 0 | 64 | 6 |
