= Jim Fenlon =

English footballer (born 1994)

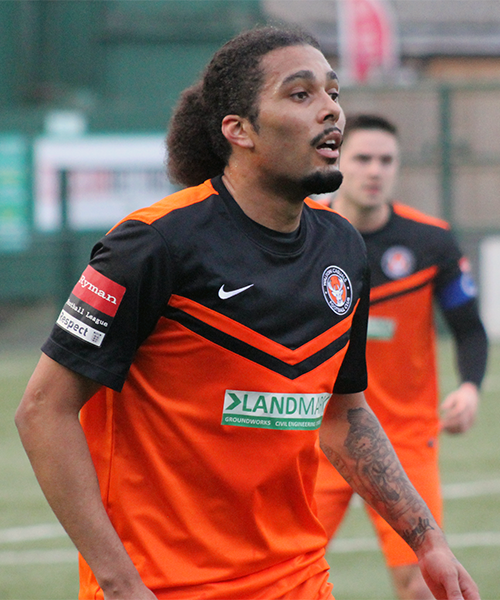
- Fenlon playing for Walton Casuals in December 2016

Personal information
- Full name: James Shaquelle Christopher Fenlon
- Date of birth: 3 March 1994 (age 32)
- Place of birth: Lewisham, England
- Height: 1.81 m (5 ft 11 in)
- Position: Defender

Team information
- Current team: Walton & Hersham

Youth career
- –2010: Stirling Lions
- 2010–2012: AFC Wimbledon

Senior career*
Years	Team	Apps	(Gls)
2012–2014	AFC Wimbledon	36	(1)
2014	Ross County	4	(0)
2015–2016	Hayes & Yeading United	40	(0)
2016	Leatherhead	12	(0)
2016–2017	Walton Casuals	19	(1)
2017–	Walton & Hersham	34	(3)
- * Club domestic league appearances and goals as of 3 April 2018

James Shaquelle Christopher Fenlon (born 15 March 1994) is an English semi-professional footballer who plays for Combined Counties Premier Division club Walton & Hersham as a full-back.

An AFC Wimbledon youth product, he made 41 first-team appearances before a move to Ross County in July 2014. Upon his release, he joined Hayes & Yeading United in January 2015, before a move to Leatherhead in September 2016. He joined Walton Casuals in December 2016 and signed for local rivals Walton & Hersham in July 2017.

== Career ==
=== Youth ===
Living in Australia for six years, Fenlon played for Western Australia state and Stirling Lions - a club that competed in the West State League, one stage lower than the Australian A-League. Upon his return to England he joined AFC Wimbledon U16s.

=== AFC Wimbledon ===
On 18 May 2012, Fenlon signed his first professional contract with the Dons. His first involvement came as an unused substitute in a 3-1 League Cup First Round defeat at Stevenage on 14 August.

On 21 August, he made his Football League debut as a half-time substitute for Warren Cummings in a 6–2 defeat to Burton Albion. He made his first start for the club four days later in a 5–1 defeat at Bradford City. Fenlon scored his first professional goal in a 3–2 defeat to Oxford United on 2 October.

On 6 June 2014, it was announced that Fenlon had been offered a new contract but could not come to an agreement with the club. Manager Neal Ardley revealed the Fenlon was offered reduced terms due to the club's budget situation and, according to Ardley, Fenlon's attitude.

=== Ross County ===
In July 2014, Fenlon signed for Scottish Premiership club Ross County. He made his debut on 10 in a 2–1 defeat to St Johnstone on 10 August. With County struggling in the league, Fenlon also featured in defeats to Partick Thistle, Dundee United and Aberdeen while being named as an unused substitute on two occasions.

On 26 August, he recorded his first victory for the club in a 2-1 Scottish League Cup win at Stranraer. His final appearance for the club came in a 2-0 League Cup defeat to Hibernian on 23 September.

On 28 November, Fenlon's contract was terminated by mutual consent.

=== Hayes & Yeading United ===
In January 2015, Fenlon signed for Conference South club Hayes & Yeading United. In May 2015, he was named Player's Player of the Year at the club's annual award ceremony.

=== Leatherhead ===
In September 2016, Fenlon completed a move to Isthmian League Premier Division outfit Leatherhead. On 14 September, he made his debut in an Isthmian League Cup First Round victory over Walton Casuals.

Fenlon made his league debut a week later in a 1–1 draw with Needham Market. Making 14 appearances in all competitions for the Tanners, his final outing came in a 3–1 victory at Hendon on 10 December.

=== Walton Casuals ===
On 30 December 2016, Fenlon joined Isthmian League Division One South side Walton Casuals. He made his debut the following day a 1–0 victory against Carshalton Athletic.

Fenlon scored his first goal in almost five years, and his only for the club, in a 5–1 defeat at Faversham Town on 4 February 2017. He left the club at the end of the season.

=== Walton & Hersham ===
In July 2017, he joined local rivals Walton & Hersham in the Combined Counties Premier Division. Fenlon made his debut on the opening day of the season in a 7–0 FA Cup win against Mile Oak.

On 10 October 2017, Fenlon became the club's first player to score at the Elmbridge Xcel Sports Hub – their new ground shared with Walton Casuals – in a 6–1 Combined Counties Challenge Cup victory against Badshot Lea. Five days later, he scored against from the penalty spot in a 2–0 win at Horley Town. On 21 October, Fenlon scored his third penalty of the season in a 3–3 draw against Balham.

== Statistics ==
As of 3 April 2018

Club	Season	Division	League		FA Cup		League Cup		Other		Total	
Club	Season	Division	Apps	Goals	Apps	Goals	Apps	Goals	Apps	Goals	Apps	Goals
AFC Wimbledon	2012–13	League Two	17	1	3	0	0	0	1 (Note: One appearance in the Football League Trophy.)	0	21	1
AFC Wimbledon	2013–14	League Two	19	0	0	0	0	0	1 (Note: One appearance and one goal in the Football League Trophy.)	1	20	1
AFC Wimbledon	Total		36	1	3	0	0	0	2	1	41	2
Ross County	2014–15	Scottish Premiership	4	0	0	0	2	0	0	0	6	0
Hayes & Yeading United	2014–15	National League South	13	0	0	0	0	0	0	0	13	0
Hayes & Yeading United	2015–16	National League South	21	0	0	0	0	0	2	0	23	0
Hayes & Yeading United	2016–17	Southern League Premier Division	6	0	0	0	0	0	0	0	6	0
Hayes & Yeading United	Total		40	0	0	0	0	0	2	0	42	0
Leatherhead	2016–17	Isthmian League Premier Division	12	0	0	0	1	0	1 (Note: One appearance in the FA Trophy.)	0	14	0
Walton Casuals	2016–17	Isthmian League Division One South	19	1	0	0	0	0	3 (Note: Three appearances in the Southern Combination Challenge Cup.)	0	22	1
Walton & Hersham	2017–18	Combined Counties Premier Division	34	3	3	0	4	1	5 (Note: Four appearances in the FA Vase.) (Note: One appearance in the Surrey Senior Cup.)	0	46	4
Career total			145	5	6	0	7	1	13	1	171	7
