= Frankie Merrifield =

English footballer (born 1994)

Personal information
- Full name: Frankie Edward Peter Merrifield
- Date of birth: 8 January 1994 (age 32)
- Place of birth: Hackney, England
- Positions: Midfielder; forward

Team information
- Current team: Billericay Town

Youth career
- 2010–2012: AFC Wimbledon

Senior career*
Years	Team	Apps	(Gls)
2012–2013	AFC Wimbledon	5	(0)
2012–2013	→ Harrow Borough (loan)	10	(2)
2013–2014	Hayes & Yeading United^{[A]}	45	(2)
2014–2016	Bishop's Stortford	58	(4)
2016–2017	Chelmsford City	8	(0)
2016–2017	→ Canvey Island (dual registration)	21	(4)
2017–2019	Canvey Island	80	(19)
2019–2020	East Thurrock United	30	(14)
2020–2023	Bishop's Stortford	81	(46)
2023–	Billericay Town	66	(13)
- * Club domestic league appearances and goals as of 16:15, 7 April 2025 (UTC)

Frankie Edward Peter Merrifield (born 8 January 1994) is an English professional footballer who plays as a midfielder or forward for Billericay Town.

== Career ==
=== AFC Wimbledon ===
Merrifield signed his first professional contract with AFC Wimbledon in December 2011, having joined the club's youth system at the age of 16 two years previously. Merrifield's contract with the club was extended on 18 May 2012. Merrifield made his league debut in a 5–1 defeat by Bradford City on 25 August 2012 as an 87th minute substitute for Christian Jolley. The midfielder scored his first senior goal for AFC Wimbledon in the first round of the 2012–13 Football League Trophy against Southend United on 4 September 2012, although the game ended in a 2–1 defeat after Ryan Cresswell scored for the Shrimpers in the fourth minute of stoppage time. Merrifield made his first league start for the Dons on 8 September 2012 in a 2–0 defeat against Northampton Town. On 30 November 2012, Merrifield was loaned out to Isthmian League Premier Division side Harrow Borough on an initial two-month loan deal along with teammate Emmanuel Akokhia. He made his debut for The Boro in a 0–0 draw with Whitehawk on 1 December 2012. On 8 December 2012, he struck a first-half equaliser for Harrow Borough against East Thurrock United, with the match eventually ending as a 3–2 defeat. On 29 January 2013, Merrifield scored his second league goal in a 3–2 loss to Metropolitan Police. On 4 February 2013, it was announced that Merrifield's loan spell had been extended by a further month. On 4 March 2013, it was announced that Merrifield had returned to AFC Wimbledon. During his loan spell he made ten appearances for Harrow Borough, scoring twice. On 1 July 2013, it was announced that Merrifield had left AFC Wimbledon.

=== Hayes & Yeading United ===
Merrifield featured in two of Hayes & Yeading United's pre-season matches after Phil Babb made his interest in the midfielder known. On 27 July 2013, he scored one goal in the 3–1 victory over Wealdstone, in the 63rd minute. On 15 August, he was announced as one of the club's new summer signings.

=== Bishop's Stortford ===
In October 2014, Merrifield signed for Bishop's Stortford. He scored on his debut against Eastbourne Borough.

=== Chelmsford City ===
On 31 May 2016, Merrifield joined manager Rod Stringer and teammate Anthony Church in the switch from Bishop's Stortford to Chelmsford City.

=== Canvey Island ===
On 30 December 2016, Merrifeld joined Canvey Island on dual registration.

He signed permanently for the Gulls in June 2017. During his time with the club he switched from a midfielder to a striker.

=== East Thurrock United ===
Merrifield spent one year with the Rocks, scoring 17 goals in all competitions before the season was curtailed due to the COVID-19 pandemic lockdown.

=== Bishop's Stortford return ===
Merrifield rejoined Bishop's Stortford for the 2020–21 season. He spent three years at the club during his second spell, culminating in the team winning the 2022–23 Isthmian League Premier Division, with Merrifield voted Supporters' Player of the Season.

=== Billericay Town ===
In June 2023 after Bishop's Stortford were promoted to the National League North, Merrifield opted to remain in the Isthmian League Premier Division due to family and work commitments, signing with Billericay Town.

== Career statistics ==
Appearances and goals by club, season and competition
Club	Season	League			FA Cup		Other		Total	
Club	Season	Division	Apps	Goals	Apps	Goals	Apps	Goals	Apps	Goals
AFC Wimbledon	2012–13	League Two	5	0	0	0	1 (Note: Appearance(s) in Football League Trophy)	1	6	1
Harrow Borough (loan)	2012–13	Isthmian League Premier Division	10	2	0	0	0	0	10	2
Hayes & Yeading United	2013–14^{[A]}	Conference South	38	2	1	1	3 (Note: Two appearances in FA Trophy; one appearance in Middlesex Senior Cup)	0	42	3
Hayes & Yeading United	2014–15	Conference South	7	0	1	0	0	0	8	0
Hayes & Yeading United	Total		45	2	2	1	3	0	50	3
Bishop's Stortford	2014–15	Conference South	24	3	0	0	3 (Note: Two appearances in FA Trophy; one appearance in Hertfordshire Senior Cup)	0	27	3
Bishop's Stortford	2015–16^{[B]}	National League South	34	1	0	0	5 (Note: One appearance in FA Trophy; two appearances one goal in Hertfordshire Senior Cup; two appearances two goals in Hertfordshire Charity Cup)	3	39	4
Bishop's Stortford	Total		58	4	0	0	8	3	66	7
Chelmsford City	2016–17	National League South	8	0	0	0	2 (Note: Appearance(s) in Essex Senior Cup)	0	10	0
Canvey Island	2016–17 (Note: This season was on dual-registration with Chelmsford City)	Isthmian League Premier Division	21	4	0	0	0	0	21	4
Canvey Island	2017–18	Isthmian League Division One North	42	5	1	0	4 (Note: One appearance in FA Trophy; one appearance in Isthmian League Cup; two appearances in Isthmian League Division One North play-offs)	0	47	5
Canvey Island	2018–19	Isthmian League Division One North	38	14	1	0	3 (Note: Two appearances two goals in FA Trophy; one appearance in Isthmian League Cup)	2	42	16
Canvey Island	Total		101	23	2	0	7	2	110	25
East Thurrock United	2019–20	Isthmian League Premier Division	30	14	2	1	4 (Note: Two appearances one goal in FA Trophy; one appearance one goal in Isthmian League Cup; one appearance in Essex Senior Cup)	2	36	17
Bishop's Stortford	2020–21	Isthmian League Premier Division	6	5	5	2	2 (Note: Appearance(s) in FA Trophy)	1	13	8
Bishop's Stortford	2021–22	Isthmian League Premier Division	35	19	2	0	3 (Note: Two appearances two goals in FA Trophy; one appearance in Isthmian League Premier Division play-offs)	2	40	21
Bishop's Stortford	2022–23	Isthmian League Premier Division	40	22	1	0	4 (Note: Three appearances one goal in FA Trophy; one appearance one goal in Hertfordshire Senior Cup)	2	45	24
Bishop's Stortford	Total		81	46	8	2	9	5	98	53
Career total			338	91	14	4	34	13	386	108

== Notes ==
A. Although Soccerway only credits Merrifield with one league goal for Hayes & Yeading United, the team's official website credits him with two. The discrepancy occurs in 15 April game against Dorchester Town – Soccerway lists the first goalscorer as Freddie Ladapo, but the Hayes & Yeading United match report credits it to Merrifield. The video highlights of the game verify Merrifield as the goalscorer.
B. Soccerway and the Aylesbury United Archive differ for this season by one appearance and one goal. It is considered the Aylesbury United Archive is correct regarding the appearance discrepancy (against Hemel Hempstead Town on 19 September 2015), as a tweet shows that Dymon Labonne was still on the pitch in the 85th minute, after Soccerway states he was substituted off. However, it is considered that Soccerway is correct for the goal discrepancy (against Chelmsford City on 29 February 2016), as YouTube footage shows that it was an own goal by Christian Dibble.
