= Toby Ajala =

English footballer

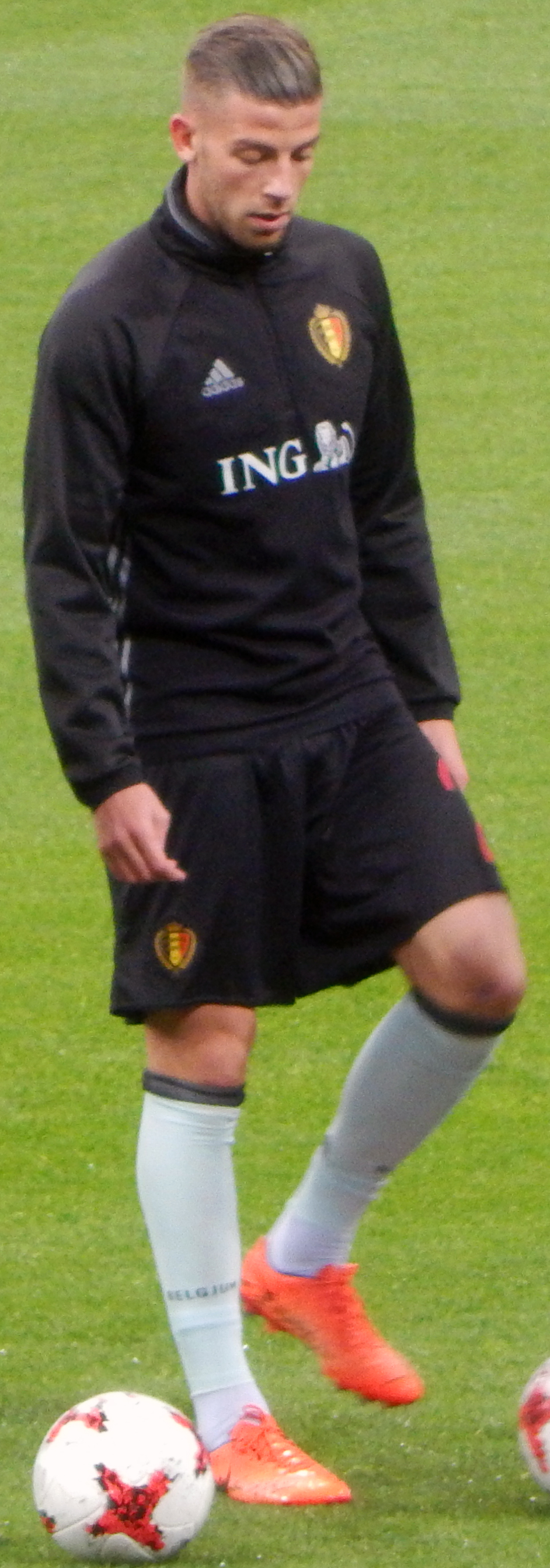

Personal information
- Date of birth: 27 September 1991 (age 35)
- Place of birth: Newham, London, England
- Positions: Midfielder; striker

Team information
- Current team: Faversham Town

Youth career
- Elite Pro Sports
- Home Farm

Senior career*
Years	Team	Apps	(Gls)
2008–?	Ilford	?	(?)
20??–2011	Interwood	?	(?)
2011	Hull City	0	(0)
2011	Interwood	?	(?)
2011–2012	Hayes & Yeading United	10	(0)
2011	→ Burnham (loan)	1	(0)
2012–2014	Bristol City	2	(0)
2012–2013	→ AFC Wimbledon (loan)	12	(0)
2013	→ Cheltenham Town (loan)	0	(0)
2014	Welling United	15	(0)
2014–2015	Torquay United	45	(5)
2015–2016	Dover Athletic	16	(1)
2016	Torquay United	18	(1)
2016–2017	Gateshead	7	(1)
2017	Welling United	1	(0)
2017	Dartford	3	(0)
2017	Thamesmead Town	7	(1)
2017–2018	Harlow Town	17	(1)
2018	Kingstonian	13	(1)
2018–2019	Ashford United	23	(2)
2019–2020	Glebe	23	(7)
2020–2021	Romford	11	(0)
2021–2022	Sittingbourne	8	(1)
2022	Bowers & Pitsea	12	(0)
2022–2023	Ashford United	8	(2)
2023–	Faversham Town	0	(0)
- * Club domestic league appearances and goals as of 12:44, 11 January 2023 (UTC)

Ridwan Oluwatobi A. T. "Toby" Ajala(born 27 September 1991) is an English professional footballer who plays for Faversham Town.

== Early life ==
Ajala was born in Newham, London, and moved to Dublin aged five. He played youth football in Dublin for Home Farm, before returning to London aged 16.

== Career ==
Ajala began his senior career with Isthmian League side Ilford in 2008. He then played for Buntingford Town in the Herts Senior County League & former Bedfordshire League side Southill Alexander before going back to play for Danny Bailey at Middlesex County Football League side Interwood until 2011 when he had a trial with Doncaster Rovers before joining Championship club Hull City, though he never played for their first team. He returned to Interwood before playing in the Conference National for Hayes & Yeading United in the 2011–12 season. Ajala has also had trials with Brentford and Newcastle United.

=== Bristol City ===
Ajala joined Bristol City for the 2012–13 season, signing a contract until January 2013 then to the end of the 2012–13 season. He was awarded the number 35 shirt and made his professional début for the club on 16 April 2013 in a 0–1 home defeat to Birmingham City, a match in which City were also relegated. He came on as an 89th-minute substitute for Neil Kilkenny.

=== AFC Wimbledon ===
Ajala joined League Two side AFC Wimbledon on a short-term loan deal in 2012. He made his debut for the Football League Two side in an FA Cup tie against Milton Keynes Dons on 2 December 2012. He made an assist for the equaliser but it proved only to be a consolation as the match ended 2–1 to MK Dons. He was recalled by Bristol City for upcoming matches.

=== Non-league ===
Ajala signed for Welling United on 31 January 2014. He played 15 times for the Wings, before leaving at the end of the season. Ajala signed a one-year deal with Torquay United on 20 July 2014. On 9 September 2015, it was announced that Ajala had signed for Dover Athletic On 4 January 2016, Ajala re-joined Torquay United, on a deal until the end of the season. Ajala signed for Gateshead in June 2016 after turning down a new deal at Torquay. Ajala joined Welling United for the second time in August 2017 and made his only appearance in the first half of the National League South 2017/18 opener versus Truro City. Ajala signed for Dartford in August 2017 and made his debut versus Oxford City on 19 August 2017. Ajala signed for Thamesmead Town in September 2017 and made seven league appearances for the club and one cup appearance. He scored his only goal in a 4–2 home defeat to Greenwich Borough on 30 September 2017. Ajala signed for Harlow Town in November 2017. He made his debut for the club in a 1–0 win over Leiston on 7 November 2017. Ajala signed for Kingstonian in February 2018 and made his debut for the club in a 1–1 draw with Folkestone Invicta on 24 February 2018. He scored his first goal for the club two weeks later, on 10 March 2018, coming off the bench to score his side's only goal in a 3–1 defeat to Leiston. Ajala signed for Ashford United in November 2018 and made his debut for the club in a 3–0 win over Greenwich Borough. Ajala spent the first half of the 2019–20 season with Glebe, before joining Romford in February 2020. He joined Sittingbourne for 2021–22. He left the club in February 2022 due to injury. Ajala joined Bowers & Pitsea for 2022-23. Following a brief return to Ashford United, he joined Faversham Town in January 2023.
