= Yado Mambo =

English footballer

Personal information
- Date of birth: 22 October 1991 (age 35)
- Place of birth: Kilburn, London, England
- Height: 1.90 m (6 ft 3 in)
- Position: Defender

Team information
- Current team: Hampton & Richmond Borough
- Number: 5

Youth career
- ?–2009: Charlton Athletic

Senior career*
Years	Team	Apps	(Gls)
2009–2013	Charlton Athletic	0	(0)
2009	→ Welling United (loan)	6	(1)
2009	→ Dover Athletic (loan)	0	(0)
2009–2010	→ Staines Town (loan)	15	(1)
2010	→ Eastbourne Borough (loan)	5	(0)
2011	→ Staines Town (loan)	4	(0)
2011–2012	→ Ebbsfleet United (loan)	24	(1)
2012	→ AFC Wimbledon (loan)	13	(0)
2013	→ Shrewsbury Town (loan)	15	(1)
2014	Ebbsfleet United	4	(1)
2014	Dover Athletic	1	(0)
2014–2015	Chelmsford City	21	(2)
2015–2016	Hayes & Yeading	?	(?)
2016	Margate	13	(1)
2016	Bishop's Stortford	3	(0)
2016–2017	Ebbsfleet United	14	(0)
2018	Wealdstone	2	(0)
2018–	Hampton & Richmond Borough	4	(0)
- * Club domestic league appearances and goals as of 05:01, 23 November 2018 (UTC)

Yado Massaya Mambo (born 22 October 1991) is an English footballer who plays as a defender for Hampton & Richmond Borough. He started his career at Charlton Athletic for whom he featured in a number of cup matches, and also spent time on loan in the Football League for AFC Wimbledon and Shrewsbury Town in 2012/13 season.

== Career ==
=== Charlton Athletic ===
Mambo started his career in Charlton Athletic's youth academy, and on turning professional went on numerous loans to non-league sides Welling United, Dover Athletic, Staines Town, Eastbourne Borough, and Ebbsfleet United.

Having signed a one-year contract extension at Charlton in July 2012, Mambo went on further loan deals at AFC Wimbledon in League Two and Shrewsbury Town in League One but was released at the end of the season. Mambo subsequently went on trial at Colchester United in July 2013 but was not offered a deal after suffering an knee injury during his trial.

=== Ebbsfleet United ===
After a period out of the game, Mambo rejoined his former loan club Ebbsfleet United, now playing in the Conference South on 1 February 2014, initially on non-contract terms.

=== Margate ===
On 29 May 2016, Mambo signed for Margate.

=== Ebbsfleet United ===
Mambo re-joined Ebbsfleet, where their failings to give him the number 5 shirt (in reference to the famous 1999 hit Mambo No. 5) went viral. After the social media outcry, he did don the shirt for a match, the shirt was then auctioned off. Mambo retired through injury aged 26 in late 2017.

=== Wealdstone ===
After he was given the all-clear to play part-time, Mambo joined Wealdstone on non-contract terms in the summer of 2018.
