= Charlie Strutton =

English footballer (1989–2024)

Personal information
- Full name: Charles George Strutton
- Date of birth: 17 April 1989
- Place of birth: Brent, England
- Date of death: 21 February 2024 (aged 34)
- Height: 1.82 m (6 ft 0 in)
- Position: Striker

Youth career
- 2000–2006: Chalfont St Peter

Senior career*
Years	Team	Apps	(Gls)
2006–2012	Chalfont St Peter	250	(135)
2012–2014	AFC Wimbledon	17	(3)
2012	→ Maidenhead United (loan)	5	(1)
2013	→ Braintree Town (loan)	7	(6)
2013	→ Aldershot Town (loan)	1	(0)
2014–2016	Braintree Town	11	(4)
2015	→ Maidenhead United (loan)	5	(0)
2015	→ Hayes & Yeading United (loan)	2	(0)
2015	→ Slough Town (loan)	16	(6)
2016–2017	Maidenhead United	1	(0)
2016	→ Chalfont St Peter (loan)	11	(3)
Total		326	(158)
- * Club domestic league appearances and goals

Charles George Strutton (17 April 1989 – 21 February 2024) was an English professional footballer who played as a striker. Strutton died on 21 February 2024, at the age of 34.

== Career ==
=== Non–League career ===
Strutton came through the youth system of Chalfont St Peter and was moved up to the first team squad at the age of 17 in 2006, where he remained until 2012. Strutton proved to be a prolific goal scorer for the club, scoring 14 league goals in 29 appearances in 2007–08. The following season, he improved his tally, scoring 25 goals in 32 appearances for "The Saints" during the 2008–09 season. Strutton scored 42 league goals in 64 appearances between 2010 and 2012.

=== AFC Wimbledon ===
On 2 March 2012, it was announced that Strutton had signed a short–term contract with AFC Wimbledon. The striker was immediately loaned out to Maidenhead United on the same day. He scored his only goal of the loan spell against Woking in a 2–0 win for "The Magpies" on 3 March 2012 before suffering an ankle injury which prevented him playing for the rest of the season. After remaining on trial with AFC Wimbledon for the duration of the pre–season, he was rewarded with a permanent move to "The Dons" on 13 August 2012. Strutton made his football league debut for "The Dons" on 18 September 2012 as a second-half substitute for Warren Cummings in a 1–0 defeat to Torquay United. Strutton scored his first goal for "The Dons" on 3 November 2012 in the First Round of the FA Cup, earning a 1–1 draw and a replay with York City. He also proved indispensable to "The Dons" in the reply at Kingsmeadow, scoring two of the four goals in a victory which allowed AFC Wimbledon to progress to the Second Round of the FA Cup. The 24-year–old striker signed a new two–year contract with AFC Wimbledon on 20 May 2013. He failed to get much game time for The Dons in the opening stage of the season and soon found himself loaned out to Conference National side Braintree Town on an initial one-month loan deal. He scored his first goal on 28 September 2013 in a 3–1 win over Alfreton Town. Strutton scored twice in a 3–0 win over Hyde on 5 October 2013. After scoring 20 goals in 18 games for Braintree, Strutton returned to the Dons shortly before joining Aldershot Town on a one-month emergency loan deal on 22 November 2013. However, Strutton suffered a fractured fibula and a slight displacement of the ankle joint during his Aldershot debut against Southport. He returned from loan immediately, with Wimbledon physio Stuart Douglas stating that it would be wrong to predict a timeframe for his return. Then he signed for Braintree Town and had loans spells at Maidenhead United, Hayes & Yeading United and Slough Town. Strutton joined Maidenhead permanently in summer 2016, but made only one appearance and returned to Chalfont on loan.

== Honours ==
Chalfont St Peter

- Spartan South Midlands League: 2010–11
