= Louis Harris (footballer) =

English footballer (born 1992)

Personal information
- Full name: Louis David Harris
- Date of birth: 7 December 1992 (age 33)
- Place of birth: Sutton Coldfield, England
- Height: 6 ft 0 in (1.83 m)
- Position: Midfielder

Youth career
- –2011: Wolverhampton Wanderers

Senior career*
Years	Team	Apps	(Gls)
2011–2012	Wolverhampton Wanderers	0	(0)
2012	→ Notts County (loan)	2	(0)
2012–2013	AFC Wimbledon	7	(1)
2013–2014	Tamworth	2	(0)
2013	→ Rugby Town (loan)	3	(0)
2013	→ Barwell (loan)	1	(0)
2014–2015	Stourbridge	13	(0)
2015–2016	→ Walsall Wood (dual registration)		
2017	Romulus		
2017–2018	Hednesford Town		
- * Club domestic league appearances and goals as of 21:30, 9 January 2020 (UTC)

Louis David Harris (born 7 December 1992) is an English footballer who most recently played for Northern Premier League Premier Division side Hednesford Town, where he plays as a midfielder.

== Playing career ==
=== Wolverhampton Wanderers ===
Harris is a product of Wolverhampton Wanderers' academy, with whom he signed a professional contract in 2011.

=== Notts County (loan) ===
In March 2012, he moved on loan to League One side Notts County for the remainder of the season. He made his professional debut on 24 March 2012 in a goalless draw at Scunthorpe United.

=== AFC Wimbledon ===
In summer 2012, Wolves announced that his contract would not be renewed, allowing Harris to join League Two side AFC Wimbledon. Harris made 7 league appearances for AFC Wimbledon before being released by the club on 14 May 2013.

=== Tamworth ===
on 25 June 2013, it was revealed that Harris was on trial with League One side Swindon Town with hopes of earning a contract at the County Ground. The trial was unsuccessful and Harris left Swindon and joined Conference side Tamworth on trial on 9 July. On 1 August 2013, Harris joined Tamworth on a permanent basis.

=== Rugby Town (loan) ===
Louis signed for Rugby Town on a one-month loan in September 2013. He played three times before returning to Tamworth.

=== Barwell (loan) ===
Harris was straight back out on loan in October 2013, this time with Barwell, he made one league appearance.

=== Stourbridge ===
In January 2014 Harris joined Stourbridge.

=== Walsall Wood (dual registration) ===
He signed for Walsall Wood on a dual registration in November 2015.

=== Hednesford Town ===
On 3 December 2017, Harris was confirmed as signing for Hednesford Town from Romulus. Following the completion of the season, it was confirmed on 6 June 2018, that Harris had left Hednesford Town and moved to Dubai.
