= Will Antwi =

British-born Ghanaian footballer

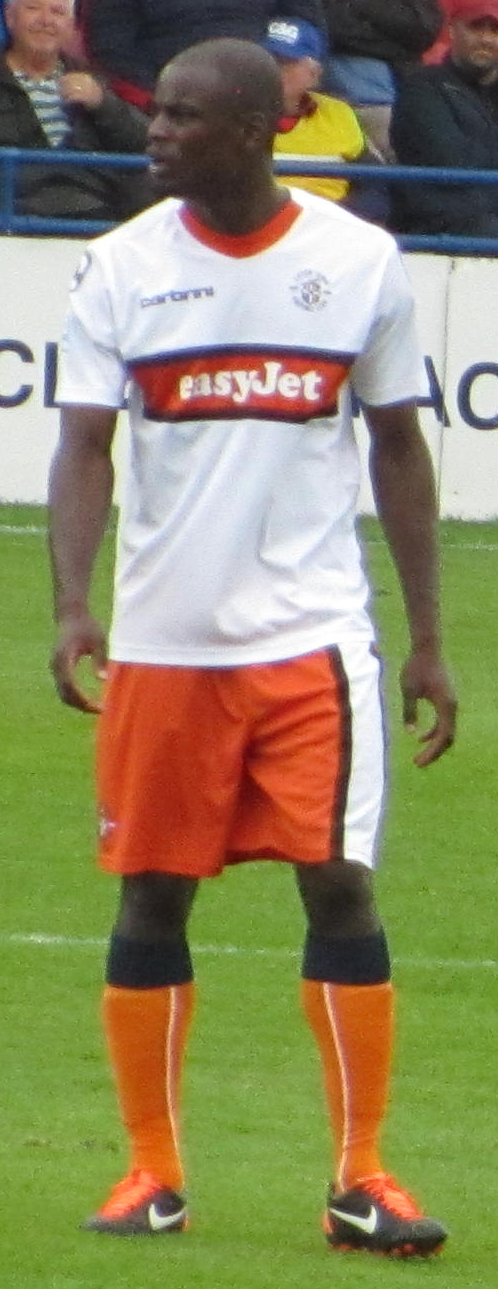
- Antwi playing for Luton Town in 2011

Personal information
- Full name: Agyei William Kwabena Antwi
- Date of birth: 19 October 1982 (age 44)
- Place of birth: Epsom, England
- Height: 1.88 m (6 ft 2 in)
- Position: Defender

Team information
- Current team: England U19s (Head Coach)

Youth career
- 1999–2002: Crystal Palace

Senior career*
Years	Team	Apps	(Gls)
2002–2004	Crystal Palace	4	(0)
2002	→ Ljungskile SK (loan)	0	(0)
2004–2005	Aldershot Town	48	(0)
2005–2009	Wycombe Wanderers	42	(1)
2008	→ Northwich Victoria (loan)	5	(0)
2009–2011	Dagenham & Redbridge	30	(2)
2011–2012	Luton Town	12	(2)
2011–2012	→ Grimsby Town (loan)	4	(1)
2012	Staines Town	7	(1)
2012–2014	AFC Wimbledon	41	(1)
Total		193	(8)

International career
2003	Ghana	3	(0)

Managerial career
- 2022–2024: England U15s
- 2024–2026: England U19s
- 2026-: England U18s
- * Club domestic league appearances and goals

Agyei William Kwabena Antwi (born 19 October 1982), is an English-born Ghanaian former professional footballer and head coach for the England U18s.

As a player, he was a defender who played between 2002 and 2014. He represented the Ghana national football team as well as appearing for Crystal Palace, Ljungskile SK, Aldershot Town, Wycombe Wanderers, Northwich Victoria, Dagenham & Redbridge, Luton Town, Grimsby Town, Staines Town and AFC Wimbledon.

== Career ==
=== Crystal Palace ===
Born in Epsom, Surrey, Antwi attended Chace Community School in north London before moving as a trainee to Crystal Palace where he became a professional player. After a brief spell in Sweden with Ljungskile SK, he returned to England with Conference side Aldershot Town where he played a pivotal part in their promotion push, including scoring the winning penalty against Hereford United in the 2003–04 Conference play–off semi–final, losing out on penalties in the final.

=== Wycombe Wanderers ===
Antwi joined Wycombe Wanderers on a free transfer in the summer of 2005 after leaving Aldershot but a groin injury in pre season meant he made his full debut on 8 April 2006, against Macclesfield Town and went on to keep his place for the 2005–06 League Two play–off games against Cheltenham Town. Antwi was given the number 5 shirt for the 2006–07 season and the 2007–08 season. Antwi captained the side on several occasions early on in the season, and took on the role of vice-captain for the 2007–08 season but found his time there to be devastated by injury.

Antwi went out on loan to Northwich Victoria on 14 November 2008, after returning from a broken toe which he suffered in the League Cup match against Birmingham City on 13 August. He returned to help guide Wycombe to automatic promotion to League One that season.

=== Dagenham & Redbridge ===
Antwi left Wycombe on 6 May 2009 and signed for Dagenham and Redbridge on a two-year contract on 17 July. He enjoyed a commanding first half of the season but on 5 December was sidelined with an ankle injury that kept him out for the rest of the season. However Dagenham went on to clinch promotion to League One in the 2009–10 League Two play–off final on 30 May 2010 at Wembley Stadium, the highest position in the club's history. Antwi left Dagenham after their relegation from League One in the 2010–11 season.

=== Luton Town ===
On 29 July 2011, he signed a six-month contract with Luton Town in the Conference. On 24 November 2011 he joined Grimsby Town on a one-month loan. Upon his return to Luton he left to take a look at options in the Veikkausliiga following the end of his contract at Kenilworth Road.

=== Staines Town ===
On 14 February 2012, Antwi joined Conference South side Staines Town. On 14 March 2012, Antwi went on, an ultimately unsuccessful, trial at Finnish Premier League side Vaasan Palloseura.

=== AFC Wimbledon ===
On 14 September 2012, Antwi joined League Two side AFC Wimbledon, teaming up once again with manager Terry Brown whom he had worked with at Aldershot Town. On 31 January 2013, his Wimbledon contract was extended until the end of the 2012–13 season. Antwi then agreed to stay on with AFC Wimbledon for the 2013–14 season.

Antwi was released by the club at the end of the 2013–14 season and went on to join Barnet on trial, he featured in the club's 1-0 friendly defeat against Peterborough United.

== Career statistics ==
Appearances and goals by club, season and competition
Club	Season	League			FA Cup		League Cup		Other		Total	
Club	Season	Division	Apps	Goals	Apps	Goals	Apps	Goals	Apps	Goals	Apps	Goals
Crystal Palace	2002–03	Division One	4	0	0	0	3	0	0	0	7	0
Aldershot Town	2003–04	Conference	14	0	0	0	0	0	5 (Note: 2 appearance(s) in FA Trophy) (Note: 3 appearance(s) in Conference play-offs)	0	19	0
Aldershot Town	2004–05	Conference National	34	0	1	0	0	0	0	0	35	0
Wycombe Wanderers	2005–06	League Two	5	0	0	0	0	0	2 (Note: Appearance(s) in League Two play-offs)	0	7	0
Wycombe Wanderers	2006–07	League Two	25	1	2	1	5	0	2 (Note: Appearance(s) in Football League Trophy)	0	34	2
Wycombe Wanderers	2007–08	League Two	6	0	0	0	0	0	1	0	7	0
Wycombe Wanderers	2008–09	League Two	6	0	0	0	1	0	0	0	7	0
→ Northwich Victoria (loan)	2008–09	Conference Premier	5	0	0	0	0	0	0	0	5	0
Dagenham & Redbridge	2009–10	League Two	19	1	1	0	1	0	1	0	22	1
Dagenham & Redbridge	2010–11	League One	11	1	2	0	0	0	1	0	14	1
Luton Town	2011–12	Conference Premier	12	2	0	0	0	0	0	0	12	2
→ Grimsby Town (loan)	2011–12	Conference Premier	4	1	0	0	0	0	0	0	4	1
Staines Town	2011–12	Conference South	7	1	0	0	0	0	0	0	7	1
Wimbledon	2012–13	League Two	23	0	0	0	2	0	0	0	25	0
Wimbledon	2013–14	League Two	18	1	0	0	0	0	0	0	18	1
Career total			193	8	6	1	12	0	12	0	223	9

== Coaching career ==
In August 2012, Antwi began working as a part-time academy coach at Premier League side Tottenham Hotspur.

On 16 August 2022, Antwi was appointed as the head coach of England U15s. On 29 January 2024, Antwi was appointed as the head coach of England U19s in addition to his U15 responsibilities. On 21 March 2024, Antwi took charge of his first match as England U19s head coach; a 1–1 draw away to Morocco.

On 9 September 2026, Antwi took charge of the England U18s.
