= List of AFC Wimbledon records and statistics =

AFC Wimbledon's rapid rise through the English football league system between 2002 and 2019. It took the club just 14 years to progress from the 9th tier to the 3rd.

AFC Wimbledon is an English professional association football club, based at Plough Lane in Wimbledon, Greater London. The club was formed on 30 May 2002 by supporters of Wimbledon Football Club, led by Kris Stewart, Marc Jones and Trevor Williams who strongly opposed the decision of an independent commission appointed by the FA to allow the relocation of Wimbledon F.C. to Milton Keynes, to be subsequently rebranded as MK Dons.

The club was accepted into the Combined Counties League for the 2002–03 season and proceeded to rise through the non-League system, winning five promotions in nine seasons to return to the Football League less than a decade after the original Wimbledon Football Club had still been competing in the top flight of English football. AFC Wimbledon's average home attendance at league fixtures for their first season exceeded 3,000 – higher than the average attendance in the same season of Wimbledon F.C., who were still playing in the First Division (now the Football League Championship).

This list encompasses the major honours won by AFC Wimbledon and records set by the club, its managers and its players. The player records section includes details of the club's leading goalscorers and those who have made the most competitive first-team appearances. The club's attendance records are also included in the list.

As of 2025, AFC Wimbledon still hold the record for the longest run of unbeaten league games at any level of senior football in the United Kingdom. The club remained unbeaten for 78 league matches between 26 February 2003 (a 3–1 away win at Chessington United) and 27 November 2004 (a 2–1 away win at Bashley).

The club's record appearance maker is defender Barry Fuller, who made 233 appearances in all competitions between 2013 and 2018 and the club's record goalscorer is Kevin Cooper, who scored 104 goals in 99 appearances in all competitions between 2002 and 2004.

== Honours ==
Following the move of Wimbledon F.C. to Milton Keynes and its rebranding as Milton Keynes Dons, there was much debate over the rightful home of all the honours won by Wimbledon F.C.. Former supporters argued that the trophies won by Wimbledon F.C. rightfully belong to the community of Wimbledon and should be returned to the local area. AFC Wimbledon believe that the honours of Wimbledon F.C. belong to the fans, as illustrated by the following statement on the club's official website:

The supporters of AFC Wimbledon believe that our club is a continuation of the spirit which formed Wimbledon Old Centrals in 1889 and kept Wimbledon Football Club alive until May 2002. We consider that a football club is not simply the legal entity which controls it, but that it is the community formed by the fans and players working towards a common goal. We therefore reproduce the honours won by what we believe was, and will always be, "our" club, in our community.

— AFC Wimbledon, statement on the club's official website

In October 2006, an agreement was reached between Milton Keynes Dons F.C., the MK Dons Supporters Association, the Wimbledon Independent Supporters Association and the Football Supporters Federation. The replica of the FA Cup plus all club patrimony gathered under the name of Wimbledon F.C. would be returned to the London Borough of Merton. Ownership of trademarks and website domain names related to Wimbledon F.C. would also be transferred to the Borough. It was also agreed that any reference made to Milton Keynes Dons F.C. should refer only to events after 7 August 2004, the date of the first league match played as Milton Keynes Dons. As a result of this deal, the Football Supporters Federation announced that the supporters of Milton Keynes Dons would be permitted to become members of the federation, and that it would no longer appeal to the supporters of other clubs to boycott MK Dons matches. The replica trophies and Wimbledon F.C. memorabilia were returned to Merton on 2 August 2007.

=== Honours ===
Only honours won by AFC Wimbledon are listed here. For a list of honours won by Wimbledon F.C., see Wimbledon F.C. HonoursFA CUP WINNERS

==== League honours ====
- Football League
  - League Two
    - Play-off Winners (2): 2015-16, 2024-25
- Football Conference
  - Conference National
    - Play-off Winners (1): 2010–11
  - Conference South
    - Champions (1): 2008–09
- Isthmian League
  - Premier Division
    - Play-off Winners (1): 2007–08
  - Division One
    - Champions (1): 2004–05
- Combined Counties League
  - Premier Division
    - Champions (1): 2003–04

==== Cups and Trophies ====
- Combined Counties League Premier Challenge Cup
  - Winners (1): 2003–04

==== Minor honours ====
- Lanes Cup
  - Winners (2): 2007–08 2011–12
- London Senior Cup
  - Winners (1): 2013–14
  - Runners-up (1): 2009–10
- Supporters Direct Cup
  - Winners (3): 2002–03 2005–06 2009–10
  - Runners-up (3): 2004–05 2006–07 2008–09
- Surrey Senior Cup
  - Winners (1): 2004–05
  - Runners-up (1): 2005–06

== Players ==
=== Most league appearances ===
As of 12 August 2025

==== Football League era (2011–present) ====
The following table shows the 10 players who have made the most appearances for AFC Wimbledon in Football League matches as well as all major Football League cup competitions in descending order. The statistics only incorporate appearances made by players since AFC Wimbledon gained promotion to the Football League in 2011. In instances where two players have the same total number of appearances, higher number of total starts shall be given precedence when determining ranking. The figure in parentheses is the number of appearances made by a player as a substitute. The figures also take into account appearances made by players whilst they were on loan to AFC Wimbledon from a parent club.

	Name	Seasons	Football League	FA Cup	League Cup	League Trophy	Play-offs	Total
1	(England) Barry Fuller	2013–2018	205 (0)	14(0)	5 (0)	5 (1)	3 (0)	232 (1) – **233**
2	(England) George Francomb	2012–2018	171 (25)	8 (2)	4 (0)	8 (3)	– (–)	191 (30) – **221**
3	(England) Jake Reeves	2015–	180 (2)	9 (0)	4 (0)	4 (3)	6 (0)	203 (5) – **208**
4	(England) Will Nightingale	2014–2025	159 (16)	5 (1)	4 (1)	18 (0)	– (–)	183 (18) – **204**
5	(England) Joe Pigott	2018–2025	125 (40)	6 (3)	6 (1)	6 (7)	– (–)	143 (51) – **194**
6	(England) Andy Barcham	2015–2019	122 (20)	7 (1)	2 (1)	2 (3)	3 (0)	136 (25) – **161**
7	(England) Sammy Moore	2011–2015	130 (9)	6 (1)	3 (1)	5 (0)	– (–)	144 (11) – **155**
8	(England) Anthony Hartigan	2017–2022	87 (31)	11 (1)	7 (1)	13 (1)	– (–)	118 (34) – **152**
9	(Montserrat) Lyle Taylor	2015–2018	116 (15)	9 (0)	2 (1)	3 (1)	3 (0)	133 (17) – **150**
10	(England) Dannie Bulman	2014–2017	110 (11)	9 (0)	2 (0)	3 (3)	3 (0)	127 (14) – **141**

==== Non–League Football era (2002–2011) ====
The following table shows the players who have made 100 appearances or more for AFC Wimbledon in semi-professional league matches (spanning from the Combined Counties Premier League up until the Conference National) as well as in all major Non–League cup competitions (including the Combined Counties League Premier Challenge Cup, the Isthmian League Cup and the Conference League Cup) in descending order. The statistics only incorporate appearances made by players prior to AFC Wimbledon gaining promotion to the Football League in 2011. In instances where two players have the same total number of appearances, league appearances shall be given precedence when determining ranking. The figure in parentheses is the number of appearances made by a player as a substitute.

	Name	Seasons	Non–League	Non–League Cup	FA Cup	FA Trophy	FA Vase	Total
1	(England) Sam Hatton	2007–2012	144 (15)	1 (1)	14 (2)	10 (2)	0 (0)	169 (20) – **189**
2	(England) Antony Howard	2004–2008	123 (14)	6 (1)	15 (0)	17 (0)	0 (0)	161 (15) – **176**
3	(England) Andy Little	2005–2010	109 (0)	3 (0)	15 (0)	16 (0)	0 (0)	143 (0) – **143**
4	(England) Danny Kedwell	2008–2011	113 (6)	0 (0)	13 (0)	4 (2)	0 (0)	130 (8) – **138**
5	(England) Luke Garrard	2006–2010	88 (10)	0 (0)	13 (1)	6 (1)	0 (0)	107 (12) – **119**
6	(Republic of Ireland) Gavin Bolger	2002–2005	78 (17)	10 (0)	3 (1)	0 (1)	6 (0)	97 (19) – **116**
7	(England) Jon Main	2007–2010	78 (23)	0 (0)	9 (1)	1 (2)	0 (0)	88 (26) – **114**
8	(England) Richard Butler	2004–2007	67 (19)	7 (1)	7 (1)	8 (0)	0 (0)	89 (21) – **110**

=== Top scorers ===
As of 12 August 2025

==== Football League era (2011–present) ====
The following table shows the 10 players who have scored the most goals for AFC Wimbledon in all Football League matches as well as all major Football League cup competitions in descending order. The statistics only incorporate appearances and goals made by players since AFC Wimbledon gained promotion to the Football League in 2011. In instances where two players have the same total goal tally, lower number of total appearances shall be given precedence when determining ranking. The figure in parentheses shows the total number of appearances made in relation to goals scored. The figures also take into account appearances made by players whilst they were on loan to AFC Wimbledon from a parent club.

	Name	Seasons	Football League	FA Cup	League Cup	League Trophy	Play-offs	Total
1	(England) Joe Pigott	2018–2025	49 (165)	3 (9)	3 (7)	3 (13)	– (–)	**58** (194)
2	(Montserrat) Lyle Taylor	2015–2018	44 (131)	5 (9)	1 (3)	3 (4)	2 (3)	**55** (150)
3	(England) Jack Midson	2011–2014	38 (126)	3 (7)	1 (3)	0 (4)	– (–)	**42** (140)
4	(Iraq) Ali Al-Hamadi	2023–2024	23 (42)	3 (2)	0 (2)	1 (2)	– (–)	**27** (48)
5	(Morocco) Ayoub Assal	2019–2023	17 (78)	4 (6)	0 (3)	3 (10)	– (–)	**24** (97)
6	(England) Adebayo Akinfenwa	2014–2016	19 (83)	1 (4)	0 (2)	1 (2)	2 (3)	**23** (94)
7	(England) Matty Stevens	2024–	18 (48)	2 (2)	1 (3)	1 (3)	0 (3)	**22** (59)
8	(Lebanon) Omar Bugiel	2023–	17 (81)	1 (4)	2 (5)	1 (5)	0 (1)	**21** (96)
9	(England) Tom Elliott	2015–2017	15 (78)	4 (5)	0 (2)	0 (3)	0 (3)	**19** (91)
10	(England) Luke Moore	2011–2014	16 (105)	1 (5)	2 (3)	– (–)	– (–)	**19** (113)

==== Non–League Football era (2002–2011) ====
The following table charts the club's top scorers in all semi-professional league matches from the Combined Counties Premier League up until the Conference National as well as in all major Non–League cup competitions (including the Combined Counties League Premier Challenge Cup, the Isthmian League Cup and the Conference League Cup) in descending order. The statistics only incorporate appearances and goals made by players prior to AFC Wimbledon gaining promotion to the Football League in 2011. In instances where two players have the same total goal tally, league goals shall be given precedence when determining ranking. Only players with 20 goals or more in all competitions have been included. The figure in parentheses shows the total number of appearances made in relation to goals scored.

	Name	Seasons	Non–League	Non–League Cup	FA Cup	FA Trophy	FA Vase	Total
1	(England) Kevin Cooper	2002–2004	90 (86)	10 (8)	0 (0)	0 (0)	4 (5)	**104** (99)
2	(England) Danny Kedwell	2008–2011	57 (119)	0 (0)	2 (13)	4 (6)	0 (0)	**63** (138)
3	(England) Jon Main	2007–2010	55 (101)	0 (0)	2 (10)	1 (3)	0 (0)	**58** (114)
4	(England) Richard Butler	2004–2007	43 (86)	2 (8)	3 (8)	4 (8)	0 (0)	**52** (110)
5	(England) Joe Sheerin	2002–2005	35 (85)	0 (1)	0 (3)	0 (1)	3 (5)	**38** (95)
6	(England) Matt Everard	2003–2005	28 (70)	4 (8)	0 (1)	0 (1)	2 (5)	**34** (85)
7	(England) Ryan Gray	2003–2006	22 (75)	3 (9)	0 (4)	0 (2)	1 (6)	**26** (96)
8	(England) Sam Hatton	2007–2012	21 (159)	0 (2)	3 (16)	1 (12)	0 (0)	**25** (189)
9	(Republic of Ireland) Gavin Bolger	2002–2005	21 (95)	2 (10)	0 (4)	0 (1)	2 (6)	**25** (116)
10	(England) Roscoe D'Sane	2006–2007	17 (35)	0 (1)	1 (4)	3 (6)	0 (0)	**21** (46)
11	(New Zealand) Shane Smeltz	2005–2006	19 (43)	0 (2)	0 (3)	1 (5)	0 (0)	**20** (53)

=== Top Scorer by season ===
==== Non-League Top Scorers by season (2002–2011) ====
The following table lists all top scorers for AFC Wimbledon by season. The statistics incorporate results for league matches and results in all major Non-League Cup competitions (including the Combined Counties League Premier Challenge Cup, the Isthmian League Cup and the Conference League Cup as well as results in the FA Vase, the FA Trophy and the FA Cup. The figure in parentheses gives the total number of appearances made by the player in that competition during the season in which they became top scorer.

Season	Name	Non-League	Non-League Cup	FA Cup	FA Trophy	FA Vase	Total
2002–03	(England) Kevin Cooper	37 (45)	1 (2)	0 (0)	0 (0)	0 (0)	**38** (47)
2003–04	(England) Kevin Cooper	53 (41)	5 (6)	0 (0)	0 (0)	4 (5)	**62** (52)
2004–05	(England) Richard Butler	24 (37)	2 (4)	2 (4)	0 (2)	0 (0)	**28** (47)
2005–06	(New Zealand) Shane Smeltz	19 (43)	0 (2)	0 (3)	1 (5)	0 (0)	**20** (53)
2006–07	(England) Roscoe D'Sane	17 (35)	0 (1)	1 (4)	3 (6)	0 (0)	**21** (46)
2007–08	(Scotland) Steven Ferguson	10 (43)	0 (0)	1 (3)	0 (5)	0 (0)	**11** (51)
2008–09	(England) Jon Main	33 (41)	0 (0)	1 (6)	0 (1)	0 (0)	**34** (48)
2009–10	(England) Danny Kedwell	21 (40)	0 (0)	1 (3)	2 (3)	0 (0)	**24** (46)
2010–11	(England) Danny Kedwell	23 (45)	0 (0)	0 (3)	2 (2)	0 (0)	**25** (50)

==== Football League Top Scorers by season (2011–present) ====
The following table lists all top scorers for AFC Wimbledon by season. The statistics incorporate results for league matches and results in all major Football League Cup competitions (including the Football League Cup and Football League Trophy as well as the FA Cup. The figure in parentheses gives the total number of appearances made by the player in that competition during the season in which they became top scorer.

Season	Name	Football League	Football League Cup	Football League Trophy	FA Cup	Total
2011–12	(England) Jack Midson	18 (46)	1 (1)	0 (2)	1 (3)	**20** (52)
2012–13	(England) Jack Midson	13 (43)	0 (1)	0 (1)	2 (3)	**15** (48)
2013–14	(England) Michael Smith	9 (23)	0 (0)	0 (1)	1 (1)	**10** (25)
2014–15	(England) Adebayo Akinfenwa	13 (37)	0 (1)	1 (1)	1 (4)	**15** (43)
2015–16	(Montserrat) Lyle Taylor	20 (42)	0 (1)	1 (1)	0 (1)	**21** (45)
2016–17	(Montserrat) Lyle Taylor	10 (43)	1 (1)	1 (1)	2 (5)	**14** (50)
2017–18	(Montserrat) Lyle Taylor	14 (46)	0 (1)	1 (2)	3 (3)	**18** (52)
2018–19	(England) Joe Pigott	17 (41)	2 (2)	0 (3)	1 (3)	**20** (49)

=== Club Captain ===
The following table lists every player that has ever been appointed to act as the Club Captain since AFC Wimbledon's inaugural season.

Season	Club Captain
2002–03	(England) Joe Sheerin
2003–04	(England) Joe Sheerin
2004–05	(England) Steve Butler
2005–06	(England) Steve Butler
2006–07	(England) Steve Butler
2007–08	(England) Jason Goodliffe
2008–09	(England) Jason Goodliffe
2009–10	(England) Paul Lorraine
2010–11	(England) Danny Kedwell
2011–12	(England) Jamie Stuart
2012–13	(England) Mat Mitchel-King

Season	Club Captain
2013–14	(Republic of Ireland) Alan Bennett
2014–15	(England) Barry Fuller
2015–16	(England) Barry Fuller
2016–17	(England) Barry Fuller
2017–18	(England) Barry Fuller
2018–19	(Nigeria) Deji Oshilaja
2019–20	(England) Will Nightingale
2020–21	(England) Alex Woodyard
2021–22	(England) Alex Woodyard
2022–23	(England) Alex Woodyard
2023–24	(England) Jake Reeves
2024-25	(England) Jake Reeves

=== Player of the Year ===
The following table lists every player that has been voted as 'Player of the Year' by The Wimbledon Independent Supporters Association (WISA) since the club's inaugural season. The (c) symbol signifies that a player was selected to act as club captain during the season in which they won the award. Names written in italics signify that a player was also AFC Wimbledon's league top scorer during the season in which they were elected Player of the Year.

Season	Player of the Year
2002–03	(England) Lee Sidwell
2003–04	(England) Matt Everard
2004–05	(England) Richard Butler
2005–06	(England) Andy Little
2006–07	(England) Antony Howard
2007–08	(England) Jason Goodliffe (c)
2008–09	(England) Ben Judge
2009–10	(England) Danny Kedwell
2010–11	(England) Sam Hatton
2011–12	(England) Sammy Moore
2012–13	(England) Jack Midson

Season	Player of the Year
2013–14	(England) Barry Fuller
2014–15	(England) Adebayo Akinfenwa
2015–16	(England) Paul Robinson
2016–17	(England) Tom Elliott
2017–18	(Nigeria) Deji Oshilaja
2018–19	(England) Will Nightingale
2019–20	(England) Terell Thomas
2020–21	(England) Joe Pigott
2021–22	(England) Jack Rudoni
2022–23	(Iraq) Ali Al-Hamadi

=== Young Player of the Year ===
The following table lists every player that has been voted 'Young Player of the Year' in the club's history. In order to be eligible to win the Natalie Callow Memorial Trophy players must be aged 21 or under at the start of the season in which they are nominated for the award. Names written in italics signify that a player was also AFC Wimbledon's league top scorer during the season in which they were elected Player of the Year. Names written in bold signify that players are still active members of the AFC Wimbledon senior squad.

Season	Player of the Year
2003–04	(Republic of Ireland) Gavin Bolger
2004–05	(England) Richard Butler
2005–06	(England) Richard Butler
2006–07	(England) Luke Garrard
2007–08	(England) Chris Hussey
2008–09	(England) Chris Hussey
2009–10	(England) Seb Brown
2010–11	(England) Seb Brown
2011–12	(England) Billy Knott
2012–13	(Wales) Jonathan Meades

Season	Player of the Year
2013–14	(England) George Francomb
2014–15	(Nigeria) Deji Oshilaja
2015–16	(England) Ade Azeez
2016–17	(England) **Will Nightingale**
2017–18	(England) **Anthony Hartigan**
2018–19	(England) Aaron Ramsdale
2019–20	(Finland) Marcus Forss
2020–21	(England) **Ayoub Assal**
2021–22	(England) Jack Rudoni

=== Team of the Year ===
The following AFC Wimbledon players were selected for the honour of being named in the 'Team of the Year' for their respective league based on consistently high performances throughout a given season.

==== Conference Premier Team of the Year ====
Season	Team of the Year
2010–11	(England) Seb Brown
2010–11	(England) Sam Hatton
2010–11	(England) Danny Kedwell

== Managers ==
=== Managerial Statistics ===
As of 7 January 2023

These statistics incorporate results for league matches (including Play-off matches) and results in all major League Cup competitions (including the Combined Counties League Premier Challenge Cup, the Isthmian League Cup, the Conference League Cup, the Football League Cup and the Football League Trophy) as well as results in the FA Vase, the FA Trophy and the FA Cup.

Caretaker managers are shown in italics, with Simon Bassey serving two stints in the role.

Name	From	Until	Games	Won	Drawn	Lost	Win %
(England) Terry Eames	13 June 2002	13 February 2004*	82	69	4	9	84.15
(England) Nick English	13 February 2004	11 May 2004	21	19	2	0	90.48
(Northern Ireland) Dave Anderson	11 May 2004	2 May 2007	167	98	40	29	58.68
(England) Terry Brown	15 May 2007	19 September 2012	270	133	54	83	49.26
(England) Simon Bassey	19 September 2012	10 October 2012	4	2	0	2	50.00
(England) Neal Ardley	10 October 2012	12 November 2018	334	113	98	123	33.83
(England) Simon Bassey	12 November 2018	4 December 2018	4	2	0	2	50.00
(England) Wally Downes	4 December 2018	25 September 2019#	42	11	13	18	26.19
(Wales) Glyn Hodges	25 September 2019	20 January 2021	62	18	18	26	29.00
(England) Mark Robinson	20 January 2021	28 March 2022	68	17	23	28	25.00
(Wales) Mark Bowen	30 March 2022	7 May 2022	7	0	4	3	0.00
(England) Johnnie Jackson	16 May 2022	present	34	13	11	10	38.2

* suspended as manager on 13 February but not officially dismissed until 18 February 2004. # suspended as manager on 25 September but not officially dismissed until 20 October 2019.

=== Honours ===
The following is a list of all AFC Wimbledon managers to date who have ever won a league promotion or major trophy during their tenure.

Caretaker managers are shown in italics.

Name	From	Until	Games	Win %	Honours
(England) Nick English	13 February 2004	11 May 2004	21	90.48	2003–04 Combined Counties League Premier Division Champions; 2003–04 Combined Counties League Premier Challenge Cup winners
(Northern Ireland) Dave Anderson	11 May 2004	2 May 2007	167	58.68	2004–05 Isthmian League First Division Champions
(England) Terry Brown	15 May 2007	19 September 2012	270	49.26	2007–08 Isthmian League Premier Division play-off winners 2008–09 Conference South Champions; 2010–11 Conference National play-off winners
(England) Neal Ardley	10 October 2012	12 November 2018	334	33.83	2015–16 Football League Two play-off winners

== Team Records ==
Undoubtedly the club's greatest record to date is securing 5 promotions in 9 seasons, believed to be the fastest ascent for any English football club. Chief executive Erik Samuelson said that the club has always planned a return to the top flights of English football: "I was clearing out some old files the other day and found a five-year plan from the first season and we assumed promotion every other year. It never occurred to us that we wouldn't succeed. We didn't expect it but always believed we would do what the old Wimbledon did and we have."

=== Matches ===
- First Non-League Match: 1–2 win v Sandhurst Town, 17 August 2002.
- First FA Vase Match: 2–7 win v Westfield, 6 September 2003.
- First FA Cup Match: 3–0 win v Ashford Town, 4 September 2004.
- First FA Trophy Match: 2–0 win v Metropolitan Police, 9 October 2004.
- First Football League Match: 2–3 loss v Bristol Rovers, 6 August 2011.
- First Football League Cup Match: 3–2 loss v Crawley Town, 29 July 2011.
- First Football League Trophy Match: 2–2 draw v Stevenage (ending as a 4–3 win following a penalty shoot-out), 4 October 2011.

=== Scorelines ===
- Record league home victory: 9–0 v Slough Town, 31 March 2007 in the Isthmian League Premier Division.
- Record league home defeat: 0–4 v Southend United, 20 November 2012 in Football League Two.
- Record league away victory: 0–9 v Chessington United, 14 February 2004 in the Combined Counties League Premier Division.
- Record league away defeat: 5–0 v York City, 7 April 2010 in the Conference Premier. 5-0 v Peterborough United 8 November 2025 in Sky Bet League One.

=== Points ===
- Most points gained in a season: 130 in 46 matches during the 2003–04 season in the Combined Counties League Premier Division.
- Fewest points gained in a season: 37 in 46 matches during the 2021-22 season in Football League One, 35 in 35 matches during the 2019-20 season in Football League One (shortened due to the COVID-19 Pandemic)

=== Streaks ===
- Longest unbeaten league run: 78 matches, from 26 February 2003 to 27 November 2004 (the longest unbeaten run of league matches recorded in all of English senior men's football).
- Longest winning streak (League): 32 matches, from 18 March 2003 to 7 January 2004.
- Longest drawing streak (League): 4 matches, from 3 January 2011 to 18 January 2011.
- Longest losing streak (League): 6 matches, from 26 November 2011 to 2 January 2012/5 March 2022 to 2 April 2022
- Longest streak without a win (League): 27 matches, from 11 December 2021 to 30 April 2022 (end of the season).
- Longest scoring run (League): 32 matches, from 18 March 2003 to 7 January 2004.
- Longest run without scoring (League): 4 matches, from 29 December 2021 to 18 January 2022.
- Longest run without conceding a goal (League): 7 matches, from 27 March 2004 to 21 April 2004.

=== Seasonal Results ===
- Most league wins in a season: 42 – 2003–04
- Fewest league wins in a season: 6 – 2021-22
- Most league draws in a season: 19 – 2021-22
- Fewest league draws in a season: 3 – 2002–03
- Most league losses in a season: 22 – 2011–12, 2018-19
- Fewest league losses in a season: 0 – 2003–04

=== Goals ===
- Most league goals scored in a season: 180 – 2003–04
- Fewest league goals scored in a season: 49 – 2021–22, 39 in COVID-19 shortened 2019–20 season
- Most league goals conceded in a season: 76 – 2012–13
- Fewest league goals conceded in a season: 32 – 2003–04

=== Attendance records ===
- Largest home attendance: 8,686 vs Port Vale on 11 October 2025 in EFL League One.
- Largest home attendance for a league match: 8,686 vs Port Vale on 11 October 2025 in EFL League One.
- Smallest home attendance for a league match: 1,939 vs Ashford Town on 21 November 2006 in the Isthmian League Premier Division.
- Largest away attendance for a league match: 30,424 vs Sunderland on 2 February 2019 in Football League One.
- Smallest away attendance for a league match: 473 vs Leyton on 8 September 2007 in the Isthmian League Premier Division.

==== Average attendance ====
Season	Avg. attendance (% change)
2002-03	3,003
2003-04	2,606(-13.22%)
2004-05	2,858(+9.67%)
2005-06	2,706(-5.32%)
2006-07	2,512(-7.17%)
2007-08	2,603(+3.62%)
2008-09	3,219(+23.67%)
2009-10	3,535(+9.82%)
2010-11	3,486(-1.39%)
2011-12	4,295(+23.21%)
2012-13	4,060(-5.47%)
2013-14	4,135(+1.85%)
2014-15	4,073(-1.50%)
2015-16	4,138(+1.60%)
2016-17	4,477(+8.19%)
2017-18	4,325(-3.40%)
2018-19	4,254(-1.64%)

Only includes attendances at league home fixtures, rounded to one decimal place; number in brackets is change in % from previous season.

== Player records ==
- Most league appearances: 197 (including substitute appearances), by Sam Hatton between May 2007 and May 2012.
- Most appearances overall: 241 (including starting appearances and substitutions in all competitions), by Sam Hatton between May 2007 and May 2012.
- Most league goals in a season: 53, by Kevin Cooper during 2003–04 in the Combined Counties League Premier Division.
- Most goals in a season overall: 66, by Kevin Cooper during 2003–04 in the Combined Counties League Premier Division.
- Most league goals overall: 90, by Kevin Cooper in 87 appearances (including starting appearances and substitutions), between August 2002 and May 2004.
- First player to score a goal: Glenn Mulcaire, on 17 July 2002 in a pre-season friendly against Bromley, which ultimately ended as a 2–1 defeat.
- First player to score a league goal: Kevin Cooper, on 17 August 2002 in a 2–1 away victory at Sandhurst Town in the Combined Counties League Premier Division.
- First player to score a goal in the Football League: Jamie Stuart, on 6 August 2011 in a 3–2 defeat to Bristol Rovers in Football League Two.
- First player to score a goal in the Football League Cup: Luke Moore, on 29 July 2011 in a 3–2 defeat to Crawley Town in Football League Two.
- First player to score a goal in the Football League Trophy: Sam Hatton, on 4 October 2011 in a 2–2 draw (ending as a 4–3 win on penalties) against Stevenage in Football League Two.
- First player to score a hat-trick: Ally Russell, on 26 October 2002 in a 4–0 win over Cobham in the Combined Counties League Premier Division.
- First player to receive a yellow card in a league match: Simon Bassey, on 21 August 2002 in a 2–1 loss to Chipstead in the Combined Counties League Premier Division.
- First player to receive a red card in a league match: Keith Ward, on 26 August 2002 in a 3–2 loss to Ash United in the Combined Counties League Premier Division.
- Player with the greatest number of hat-tricks: Kevin Cooper, with 13 between August 2002 and May 2004.
- Player with the greatest number of league goals in a single match: Kevin Cooper, scoring 4 in an 8–0 win over Cove 21 April 2004 in the Combined Counties League Premier Division.
- Player with the fastest league goal: Sammy Moore, scoring after just 11 seconds of play in a 5–2 win over Mansfield Town on 5 October 2010 in the Conference Premier.
- Highest transfer fee paid: Undisclosed (in excess of the £25,000 previously paid for Jon Main) paid to Charlton Athletic for Josh Davison.
- Highest transfer fee received: Undisclosed (believed to be over £1m) paid by Ipswich Town for Ali Al-Hamadi.

== Penalty shoot-outs ==
List incomplete

Season	Date	Competition	Round	Opponent	Venue	Result	Score
2010/11	21 May 2011	Conference National play-offs	Final	Luton Town	Neutral	Won	4–3
2011/12	4 October 2011	Football League Trophy	Second Round	Stevenage Borough	Home	Won	4–3
2011/12	8 November 2011	Football League Trophy	Third Round	Swindon Town	Away	Lost	1–3
2014/15	2 September 2014	Football League Trophy	First Round	Southend United	Home	Won	4–2
2018/19	4 September 2018	EFL Trophy	Group Stage	Charlton Athletic	Away	Won	4–2
2019/20	13 August 2019	EFL Cup	First Round	MK Dons	Home	Lost	2–4
2019/20	2 October 2019	London Senior Cup	First Round	Metropolitan Police FC	Away	Won	6–5
2020/21	5 September 2020	EFL Cup	First Round	Oxford United	Away	Lost	3–4
2020/21	26 November 2020	FA Cup	First Round	Barrow	Away	Won	4–2
