= Danny Kedwell =

British footballer (born 1983)

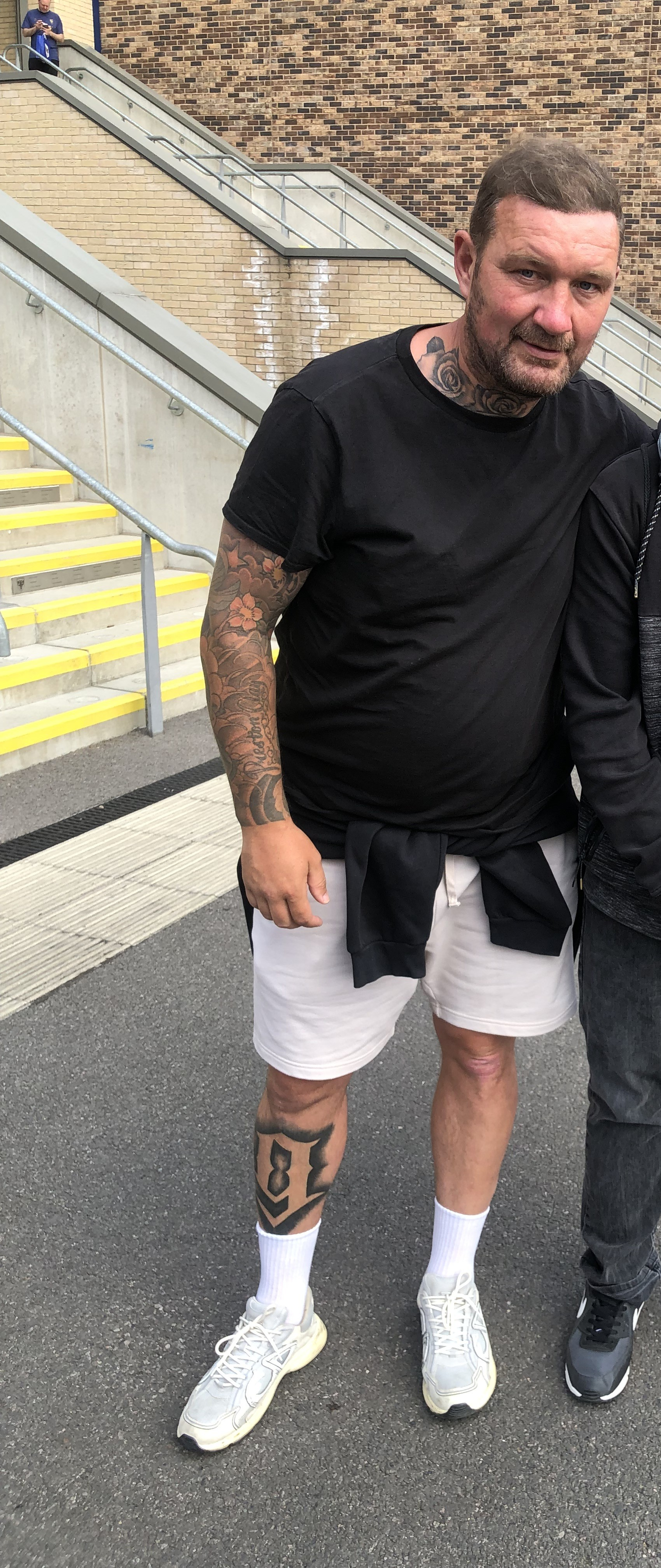
- Danny Kedwell in 2025

Personal information
- Full name: Daniel Trevor Kedwell
- Date of birth: 3 August 1983 (age 43)
- Place of birth: Gillingham, England
- Height: 1.81 m (5 ft 11 1/2 in)
- Position: Forward

Senior career*
Years	Team	Apps	(Gls)
2001–2002	Chatham Town		
2002	Tonbridge Angels		
2002–2003	Fisher Athletic		
2003	Lordswood		
2003–2004	Maidstone United		
2004–2005	Herne Bay		
2005–2007	Welling United	70	(38)
2007–2008	Grays Athletic	50	(13)
2008–2011	AFC Wimbledon (Note: Wimbledon record includes the appearance against Chester City on 31 October 2009, a match which was later expunged following Chester's expulsion from the league)	118	(58)
2011–2015	Gillingham	119	(40)
2015–2019	Ebbsfleet United	174	(57)
2019–2020	Havant & Waterlooville	26	(11)
2020	Hollands & Blair	11	(4)
2020–2021	Havant & Waterlooville	8	(1)
2021	Cray Wanderers	3	(1)
2021–2024	Chatham Town	33	(5)
2024–2025	Ashford United	8	(2)
Total		620+	(230+)

Managerial career
- 2021: Cray Wanderers (player-manager)
- 2024–2025: Ashford United
- 2025–2026: AFC Croydon Athletic
- * Club domestic league appearances and goals

Daniel Trevor Kedwell (born 3 August 1983) is an English former footballer who played as a forward. He has spent most of his career playing non-League football, but played in League One and Two during a four-year spell with Gillingham, his hometown club.

== Career ==
=== Non-League ===
Born in Gillingham, Kent, Kedwell came through the youth system of Kent-based Chatham Town and played one season for the club before joining Tonbridge Angels in the summer of 2002. His spell at the Longmead Stadium was short-lived when in October 2002 he signed for Fisher Athletic and stayed with the side until January 2003. He had a short spell at Lordswood before joining Maidstone United in the summer of 2003, staying until the end of the following season. Kedwell then signed for Kent League side Herne Bay where he was the top scorer that season finishing with 28 goals in all competitions. This attracted the attention of Conference South side Welling United, who signed the striker in the summer. Kedwell enjoyed two seasons at Welling, scoring 38 league goals, and made a further step up in 2007 when he signed for Conference side Grays Athletic for £12,000, a club record. He spent one full season at the Essex club scoring 13 league goals, and at the end of the season he dropped down a division when he signed for AFC Wimbledon for £10,000. Whilst at the south-west London club, Kedwell found some of the best scoring form of his career, and scored 67 goals in three seasons.

=== League ===
Kedwell scored the winning penalty in the 2011 Conference Premier play-off final penalty shoot-out against Luton Town to send AFC Wimbledon into the Football League. On 1 July 2011, he signed for League Two side Gillingham, his hometown club, for a fee of £60,000. He made his league debut for Gillingham on 6 August in a 1–0 win over Cheltenham Town at Priestfield Stadium. He finished his first season with the Gills as the club's top scorer with a total of 14 goals, 12 of which came in the league.

Kedwell was made captain of Gillingham for their first competitive game of the 2012–13 season in the League Cup against Bristol City. He began the league campaign in with eight goals in the Gills' first ten league matches. Kedwell also managed to score the goal that secured promotion in a 1–0 home victory over Torquay United and scored in a 2–2 draw against his old side AFC Wimbledon which secured the league title for Gillingham. He finished the season once again as the club's top goal scorer, scoring 16 goals in all competitions, 14 of which helped the Gills to win the League Two championship. On 12 May 2014, Kedwell signed a new two-year deal with the "Gills".

=== Return to Non-League ===
On 6 January 2015, Kedwell signed an 18-month contract with Conference South side Ebbsfleet United. While with the side he featured in two play-off finals. Kedwell scored two goals in the 2015–16 play-off final but missed the decisive penalty in the shootout as Ebbsfleet lost to Maidstone United. Promotion to the National League was achieved the following season with a 2–1 play-off final win over Chelmsford City.

Kedwell joined Havant & Waterlooville for the 2019–20 season, scoring 11 goals in 26 league appearances before the season was halted in March due to the COVID-19 pandemic. He was released as a free agent in July 2020.

On 13 August 2020, Kedwell joined Southern Counties East Premier Division side Hollands & Blair. In November 2020, with Blair's league suspended, Kedwell returned to Havant & Waterlooville before their league was curtailed in February 2021.

Following his player-manager role with Cray Wanderers, Kedwell returned to the Southern Counties East Premier Division to join Chatham Town on 31 December 2021, the club he was at as a junior. Following promotion to the Isthmian League, Kedwell went into the 2022–23 season in the role of assistant manager. On 13 May 2024, the club confirmed that Kedwell had departed Chatham.

== Coaching career ==
On 10 April 2021, Kedwell began his first job in management when he was appointed manager of Cray Wanderers. On 28 December 2021, Kedwell left this role by mutual consent.

On 14 May 2024, Kedwell was announced as manager of Isthmian League South East Division club Ashford United. He departed the club by mutual consent in January 2025 and shortly afterwards joined the coaching staff of Folkestone Invicta.

On 14 February 2025, Kedwell was appointed manager of Isthmian League South East Division side AFC Croydon Athletic. He stepped down from his managerial position on 15 October 2026.

== Career statistics ==
As of 19 January 2025

Appearances and goals by club, season and competition
Club	Season	League			FA Cup		League Cup		Other		Total	
Club	Season	Division	Apps	Goals	Apps	Goals	Apps	Goals	Apps	Goals	Apps	Goals
Welling United	2005–06	Conference South	31	19	1	0	—				32	19
Welling United	2006–07	Conference South	39	19			—		6 (Note: Appearance(s) in FA Trophy)	3	45	22
Welling United	Total		70	38	1	0	—		6	3	77	41
Grays Athletic	2007–08	Conference Premier	42	13	2	0	—		5 (Note: Three appearances and two goals in FA Trophy, two in Conference League Cup)	2	49	15
Grays Athletic	2008–09	Conference Premier	8	0	—		—		—		8	0
Grays Athletic	Total		50	13	2	0	—		5	2	57	15
AFC Wimbledon	2008–09	Conference South	34	14	6	2	—		1	0	41	16
AFC Wimbledon	2009–10	Conference Premier	39	21	3	1	—		3	2	45	24
AFC Wimbledon	2010–11	Conference Premier	45	23	4	0	—		5 (Note: Three appearances and one goal in Conference Premier play-offs, two appearances and two goals in FA Trophy)	3	54	26
AFC Wimbledon	Total		118	58	13	3	—		9	5	140	66
Gillingham	2011–12	League Two	40	12	4	2	1	0	1 (Note: Appearance in Football League Trophy)	0	46	14
Gillingham	2012–13	League Two	38	14	2	1	2	1	0	0	42	16
Gillingham	2013–14	League One	27	10	1	0	1	0	1	0	30	10
Gillingham	2014–15	League One	14	4	1	1	2	0	1	0	18	5
Gillingham	Total		119	40	8	4	6	1	3	0	136	45
Ebbsfleet United	2014–15	Conference South	13	3	—		—		4	2	17	5
Ebbsfleet United	2015–16	National League South	40	11	2	0	—		5 (Note: Three appearances and three goals in National League South play-offs, two appearances and one goal in FA Trophy)	4	47	15
Ebbsfleet United	2016–17	National League South	34	12	3	1	—		6 (Note: Three appearances in National League South play-offs, three in FA Trophy)	0	43	13
Ebbsfleet United	2017–18	National League	45	18	3	1	—		5 (Note: Two appearances in National League play-offs, three appearances and one goal in FA Trophy)	1	53	20
Ebbsfleet United	2018–19	National League	42	13	3	0	—		1	0	46	13
Ebbsfleet United	Total		174	57	11	2	—		21	7	206	66
Havant & Waterlooville	2019–20	National League South	26	11	3	0	—		1	1	30	12
Hollands & Blair	2020–21	Southern Counties East Premier Division	11	4	1	0	—		0	0	12	4
Havant & Waterlooville	2020–21	National League South	8	1	0	0	—		0	0	8	1
Cray Wanderers	2021–22	Isthmian League Premier Division	3	1	1	0	—		1	0	5	1
Chatham Town	2021–22	Southern Counties East Premier Division	12	1	—		—		0	0	12	1
Chatham Town	2022–23	Isthmian League South East Division	7	1	1	0	—		3 (Note: One appearance in FA Trophy and two appearances in Alan Turvey Trophy)	0	11	1
Chatham Town	2023–24	Isthmian League Premier Division	14	3	0	0	—		2 (Note: Appearance(s) in Alan Turvey Trophy)	1	16	4
Chatham Town	Total		33	5	1	0	0	0	5	1	39	6
Ashford United	2024–25	Isthmian League South East Division	8	2	3	0	—		2 (Note: One appearance in FA Trophy and one in Kent Senior Cup)	0	13	2
Career total			620	230	44	9	6	1	53	19	723	259

== Managerial statistics ==
As of 30 August 2026

Managerial record by team and tenure
Team	From	To	Record						
Team	From	To	P	W	D	L	GF	GA	Win %
Cray Wanderers	10 April 2021	28 December 2021	19	4	3	12	23	38	21.05
Ashford United	14 May 2024	20 January 2025	39	18	6	15	72	69	46.15
AFC Croydon Athletic	14 February 2025	15 October 2026	73	41	10	22	149	102	56.16
Total			131	63	19	49	244	209	48.09

== Honours ==
AFC Wimbledon

- Conference Premier play-offs: 2010–11

Gillingham

- Football League Two: 2012–13

Ebbsfleet United

- National League South play-offs: 2016–17

Chatham Town

- Isthmian League South East Division: 2022-23

Individual

- AFC Wimbledon Player of the Season: 2009–10
- AFC Wimbledon Team of the Decade (2010s)
- Conference Premier Team of the Year: 2010–11
- National League South Team of the Year: 2016–17
