= AFC Wimbledon =

Association football club in London, England

- Full name: AFC Wimbledon
- Nicknames: The Dons; The Wombles
- Founded: 30 May 2002; 24 years ago
- Ground: Plough Lane
- Capacity: 9,215
- Owner: The Dons Trust
- Chairman: Mick Buckley
- Manager: Johnnie Jackson
- League: EFL League One
- 2025–26: EFL League One, 19th of 24
- Website: afcwimbledon.co.uk
Home colours	Away colours	Third colours

AFC Wimbledon is an English professional association football club based in Wimbledon, London Borough of Merton, London. The team competes in EFL League One, the third tier of the English football league system.

The club was founded in 2002 by former supporters of Wimbledon F.C. after the Football Association allowed that club to relocate to Milton Keynes in Buckinghamshire, about 60 miles (97 km) north of Wimbledon. Most of the Wimbledon supporters were very strongly opposed to moving the club so far away from Wimbledon, feeling that a club transplanted to a distant location would no longer represent Wimbledon or the club's historic legacy and tradition. Wimbledon moved in 2003 and formally changed the name of the club to Milton Keynes Dons in 2004.

When AFC Wimbledon was formed, it affiliated to both the London and Surrey Football Associations, and entered the Premier Division of the Combined Counties League, the ninth tier of English football. The club was promoted six times in 13 seasons, going from the ninth tier (Combined Counties Premier) in the 2002–03 season to the third (League One), promoted in the 2015–16 season.

AFC Wimbledon currently hold the record for the longest unbeaten run of league matches in English senior football, having played 78 consecutive league games without a defeat between February 2003 and December 2004. They are the first club formed in the 21st century to make it into the Football League.

The club was initially based at Kingsmeadow, a ground bought from and then shared with Isthmian League club Kingstonian until 2017, and with Chelsea Women from 2017. In November 2020, the club moved to Plough Lane, a new stadium on the site of the defunct Wimbledon Greyhound Stadium, only 250 yards away from the original Plough Lane, Wimbledon F.C.'s home until 1991. The new stadium has an initial capacity of 9,215.

== History ==
=== Foundation ===
On 28 May 2002, the Football Association approved a decision by a three-person arbitration commission they had appointed to allow Wimbledon to relocate north to the new town of Milton Keynes in Buckinghamshire; a decision influenced, among other factors, by claims from Wimbledon chairman Charles Koppel that such a move was necessary in order to prevent the club from going bankrupt.

Although the absence of a ground in Milton Keynes meeting Football League criteria meant that the club were unable to physically move for over a year, major organised protests at the decision continued to be held by Wimbledon's traditional local support and a boycott of the club's home matches at Selhurst Park meant attendances dwindled immediately.

Following the F.A.'s announcement of their decision, a group of Wimbledon supporters led by Kris Stewart and fellow founding members Marc Jones and Trevor Williams met in The Fox and Grapes pub on Wimbledon Common to plan what was to be done next as part of the protest. It was agreed that as there was no right of appeal, the only option was to start the club again from scratch. On 30 May 2002, the idea was put forward in a Wimbledon Independent Supporters' Association meeting to create a new community-based club named AFC Wimbledon and an appeal for funds was launched.

On 13 June 2002, a new manager, a playing strip and badge based on that of the original Wimbledon, and a stadium were unveiled to fans and the media at the packed-out Wimbledon Community Centre. In order to assemble a competitive team at very short notice, AFC Wimbledon held player trials on 29 June 2002 on Wimbledon Common, open to any unattached player who felt he was good enough to try out for the team. The event attracted 230 hopeful players, from whom the club's squad for their inaugural season was eventually chosen.

=== Badge ===
The double-headed eagle comes from Wimbledon’s coat of arms. On the right wing is a gold rose from the badge of King Edward I, and on the left wing a gold fret (a fret is a piece of interlaced work) from the arms of Merton Priory. Merton is the borough in which Wimbledon lies.

=== Non-League football (2002–2011) ===
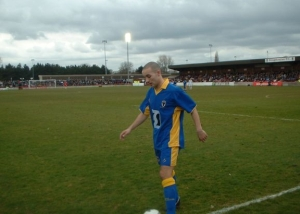
Ryan Gray prepares to take a corner in a 2–1 win over AFC Wallingford on 8 May 2004 in AFC Wimbledon's final fixture in the Combined Counties League Premier Division.

==== Combined Counties League (2002–2004) ====
In the 2002–03 season, AFC Wimbledon competed in the Combined Counties League Premier Division under the management of former Wimbledon player Terry Eames, who was appointed on 13 June 2002. Their first ever game, a pre-season friendly against Sutton United on 10 July 2002, resulted in a 4–0 loss in front of a crowd of 4,657. At the end of their debut season, AFC Wimbledon finished third in the league and narrowly failed to win promotion to the Isthmian League First Division, despite a strong end to the season that involved winning their final 11 league fixtures.

In 2003–04, AFC Wimbledon won their first 21 league games before a 2–2 draw against Sandhurst Town on 10 January 2004, giving them 32 consecutive wins in league games over two seasons. Manager Terry Eames was suspended on 13 February 2004 and sacked five days later on the grounds of gross misconduct, after evidence was produced which showed him to have firstly made unauthorised and untrue representations to a number of the coaching staff, secondly, that he had falsely informed members of the coaching staff that the club had decided not to support his plans for youth football and required him to make immediate budgetary cut-backs and thirdly that he dispensed with the services of members of the coaching staff citing untrue reasons. Assistant manager Nick English took charge with immediate effect. The team went on to finish as champions of the Combined Counties League with an unbeaten record for the season of 42 wins and four draws. AFC Wimbledon also won the league's Premier Challenge Cup after beating North Greenford United 4–1 in the Final on 30 April 2004, completing a double for the season.

==== Isthmian League (2004–2008) ====
Dave Anderson was appointed as new manager on 11 May 2004. Under his leadership AFC Wimbledon took their good form into the 2004–05 season during which they competed in the Isthmian League First Division — they remained top of the division for the duration of the season, and were convincing title-winners, sealing promotion to the League's Premier Division. The Dons secured another double by defeating Walton & Hersham 2–1 in the Final of the Surrey Senior Cup on 3 May 2005. Over the course of the season, AFC Wimbledon set a new record for the longest run of unbeaten league games at any level of senior football in the United Kingdom. The team remained unbeaten for 78 league matches between 22 February 2003 (a 2–0 defeat at home to Withdean 2000) and 4 December 2004 (a 2–0 defeat at Cray Wanderers).

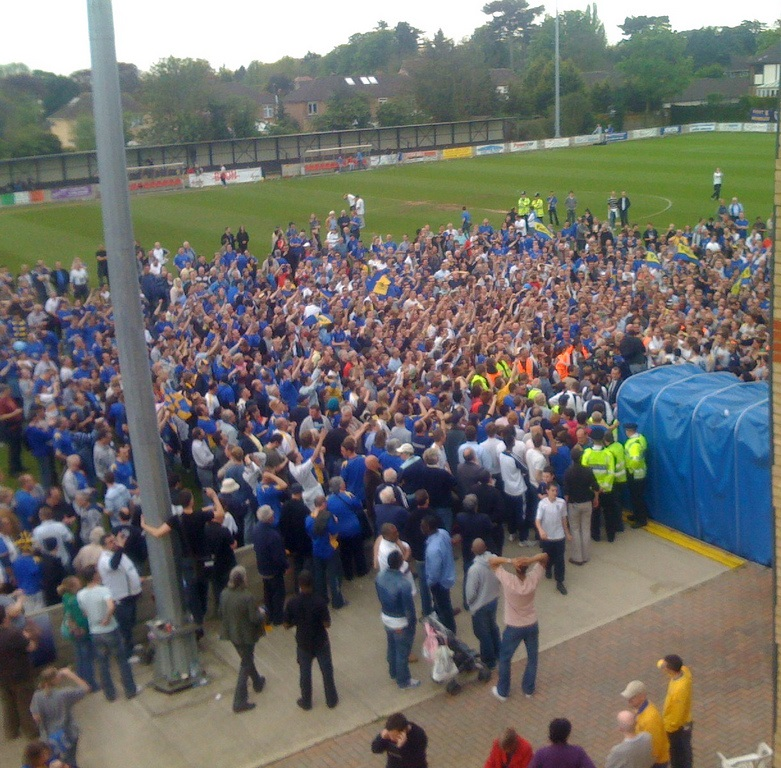
AFC Wimbledon fans and players celebrating promotion to the Conference South having beaten Staines Town 2–1 in the 2008 Isthmian League Premier Division Play-off Final.

The 2005–06 season proved far more competitive than previous seasons – as after winning their first few games, AFC Wimbledon found themselves struggling to remain in the play-off places. After fluctuating form, they eventually reached the play-offs after a 1–0 win against Anderson's former club, Hendon, on 22 April 2006. However, a 2–1 defeat at Fisher Athletic on 2 May 2006 prevented the club from achieving three back-to-back promotions. The Dons once again reached the final of the Surrey Senior Cup, however, this time they were narrowly defeated 1–0 by Kingstonian in a fiercely contested derby.

Much of the 2006–07 season was overshadowed by the threat of a proposed 18-point deduction by the FA for the club's fielding of Jermaine Darlington who, it transpired, had not been registered correctly by the club and had therefore played in three games whilst still officially ineligible. However, this punishment was eventually reduced to a three-point deduction and a £400 fine on appeal, after the FA finally acknowledged that the club had made a simple administrative error. The 'Darlington affair' also resulted in expulsion from the Surrey Senior Cup and the FA Trophy that year. Although AFC Wimbledon did enough to qualify for the play-offs, they once again missed out on promotion, this time as a result of losing 1–0 to Bromley in the play-off semi-final on 1 May 2007. Manager Dave Anderson subsequently left the club by mutual consent on 2 May 2007.

Terry Brown was appointed as the new AFC Wimbledon manager on 15 May 2007. During 2007–08, he led the club to promotion to the Conference South in his first season in charge, a feat which predecessor Dave Anderson had proved unable to achieve, having lost two consecutive play-off final opportunities in the previous two seasons. The Dons made steady progress throughout the season, qualifying for the play-offs after finishing third in the League. AFC Wimbledon beat Hornchurch 3–1 in the play-off semi-final on 29 April 2008 and went on to triumph 2–1 over Staines Town in the play-off final on 3 May 2008.

==== The Conference (2008–2011) ====

The starting line-up for the Conference Premier play-off final win against Luton Town on 21 May 2011, resulting in promotion to the Football League.

AFC Wimbledon spent most of the 2008–09 season near the top of the league table, eventually finishing as champions and earning promotion to the Conference Premier after defeating St Albans City 3–0 on 25 April 2009. The match set an attendance record of 4,722 for Kingsmeadow stadium, which at that time was full capacity.

The 2009–10 season was the club's first in the Conference Premier. Overall, the Dons finished eighth, 14 points short of the play-off zone. This was the first season in which the club had failed to make the top five in the league table.

In 2010–11, AFC Wimbledon finished as runners-up of the Conference Premier, qualifying for the play-offs. The Dons faced fifth placed Fleetwood Town in the play-off semi-finals, whom they went on to thrash 8–1 on aggregate. This aggregate scoreline set a record as the largest winning margin recorded since the Conference Premier first introduced the play-off system at the beginning of the 2002–03 season. In the play-off final at the City of Manchester Stadium on 21 May 2011, in front of a crowd of 18,195, AFC Wimbledon beat Luton Town 4–3 in a penalty shoot-out, after the match had ended 0–0 in extra time. The victory resulted in promotion to the Football League and represented the club's fifth promotion in nine years. The club's achievement of attaining League status after just nine seasons of existence is considered to be one of the fastest ascents for a new club since automatic promotion to the Football League first commenced in the 1980s. AFC Wimbledon also hold the record of being the first club to be formed in the 21st century to make it into the Football League, making them the youngest club in the Football League by some distance.

=== Reaching the Football League (2011–2020) ===
==== Becoming Established (2011-2016) ====
The 2011–12 season saw AFC Wimbledon's first season in League Two. They played their first Football League game on 6 August 2011, losing 3–2 at Kingsmeadow against Bristol Rovers, before registering their first Football League victory with a 2–0 win at Dagenham & Redbridge a week later. Wimbledon would go on to win seven out of their first 12 matches, seeing the club rise into the automatic promotion places, however they failed to keep the momentum going, eventually finishing the season ranked 16th, 10 points clear of the relegation zone.

AFC Wimbledon's rapid rise through the English football league system between 2002 and 2024. It took the club just 14 years to progress from the 9th tier to the 3rd.

The 2012–13 campaign marked the tenth anniversary of AFC Wimbledon's inaugural season. After an abysmal start to the season, manager Terry Brown was sacked on 19 September 2012 along with assistant manager Stuart Cash, with AFC Wimbledon sitting just above the relegation zone. First team coach Simon Bassey took over as caretaker manager with immediate effect. Bassey was in charge just four matches, however, before former Wimbledon player Neal Ardley was appointed as Terry Brown's permanent replacement on 10 October 2012, naming former Watford and Cardiff City teammate Neil Cox as his assistant manager. On 2 December 2012, AFC Wimbledon faced Milton Keynes Dons in the second round of the FA Cup, in the first ever meeting between the two sides following the relocation of Wimbledon to Milton Keynes, with the match ending as a 2–1 defeat for AFC Wimbledon. The Dons secured their Football League status on the final day of the 2012–13 season, despite having started the day in the relegation zone, by beating Fleetwood Town 2–1 at Kingsmeadow on 27 April 2013.

In the 2013–14 season, a match involving AFC Wimbledon was at the centre of a failed match-fixing plot. Shortly after the club's 1–0 loss against Dagenham & Redbridge on 26 November 2013, businessmen Krishna Ganeshan and Chann Sankaran and three Whitehawk players—Michael Boateng, Moses Swaibu and Hakeem Adelakun—were charged with conspiracy to commit bribery over a failed plot to fix the game. Ganeshan, Sankaran and Boateng were convicted. The club had a disappointing season overall, only managing to replicate the 20th placed league finish of the season before after the club were docked three points for the ineligible fielding of Jake Nicholson after failing to obtain international clearance for him after he joined from Scottish Championship side Greenock Morton on 19 February 2014.

The 2014–15 season saw AFC Wimbledon face Milton Keynes Dons once again in a competitive fixture on 12 August 2014 in the first round of the Football League Cup, with MK Dons eventually winning the match 3–1. The two sides met once again on 7 October 2014, with AFC Wimbledon achieving a first 3–2 win over their rivals in the second round of the Football League Trophy following a late goal from Adebayo Akinfenwa. The Dons also reached the FA Cup third round for the first time in their history on 5 January 2015, eventually succumbing 2–1 to Liverpool with Steven Gerrard scoring both goals. AFC Wimbledon finished the season in a mediocre 15th place after a disappointing run of form saw them finish the season without a win in their last eight league fixtures.

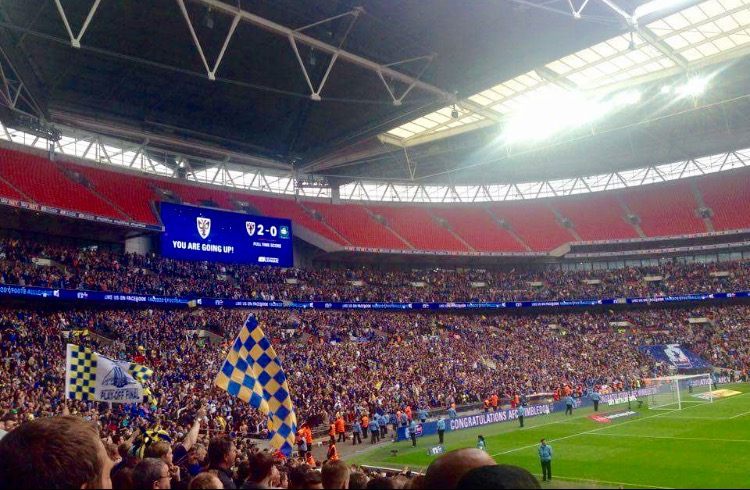
More than 20,000 AFC Wimbledon fans were present at the 2016 Football League Two play-off final at Wembley to see the club promoted to League One after a 2–0 win over Plymouth Argyle.

The 2015–16 season was AFC Wimbledon's fifth consecutive season in League Two. Despite getting the season off to a mediocre start, the Dons finished the season strongly, winning seven out of their last ten league matches to ensure that the club would confirm their highest ever League Two finish of seventh place and qualification for the 2016 Football League play-offs. A record home attendance of 4,870 turned out to see AFC Wimbledon beat Accrington Stanley 1–0 in the first leg of the play-off semi-final on 14 May 2016 (exactly 28 years to the day since the original Wimbledon won the 1988 FA Cup Final against Liverpool) following a dramatic extra time winner from academy product Tom Beere. This goal ultimately proved to be the difference between the two sides as AFC Wimbledon went on to win 3–2 on aggregate after a 2–2 draw in the reverse fixture. This win earned them a place in the play-off final at Wembley against Plymouth Argyle. The fixture was scheduled for 30 May 2016, exactly 14 years to the day since the club's foundation. AFC Wimbledon ultimately triumphed 2–0 on the day in front of a crowd of 57,956.

==== League One Consolidation (2016-2020) ====
The 2016–17 season saw AFC Wimbledon compete in League One for the first time in their history. They remained unbeaten in the South London derby fixtures, recording two draws against Millwall, a home draw against Charlton Athletic, and a 2–1 away win at The Valley on 17 September 2016. Promotion also placed AFC Wimbledon in the same division as Milton Keynes Dons, who had simultaneously been relegated from the Championship. This ensured the club would face Milton Keynes Dons for the first time at Kingsmeadow which they did on 14 March 2017, going on to triumph 2–0. The club ultimately finished 15th in the league, after a disappointing slump saw them win just five out of their last 22 league matches between January and April.

AFC Wimbledon made an equally slow start to the 2017–18 campaign, managing just five wins in their first 20 league matches between August and December. On 3 December 2017, the club recorded a 3–1 win over South London derby rivals Charlton Athletic in the second round of the FA Cup. The club were subsequently rewarded by being drawn away against Tottenham Hotspur in the third round with the match being played at Wembley on 7 January 2018. On 13 December 2017, the club received a further boost after being granted permission to begin work on constructing a new 9,300-seater stadium (which could be expanded to hold up to 20,000 in the future) on the site of Wimbledon Greyhound Stadium. The new ground will be only 250 yards (230 m) away from the original Plough Lane (1912–98), Wimbledon's home from 1912 until 1991. The club was eventually able to secure another season in League One with a draw in their penultimate game, meaning that for the first time, AFC Wimbledon would be playing in a higher division than the Milton Keynes Dons, who were relegated that season.

AFC Wimbledon saw a disastrous start to the 2018–19 season, losing twelve of their first seventeen league games. Manager Neal Ardley departed the club by mutual agreement on 12 November 2018 after a tenure of 6 years, 1 month, 2 days, making him the longest serving manager to date. One bright spot in their season was the club's first ever appearance in the FA Cup 5th Round after beating West Ham United 4–2 in the 2018–19 FA Cup. On 4 December 2018, Glyn Hodges joined Wally Downes as AFC Wimbledon's assistant manager. After being rooted to the bottom of the table for most of 2019, they lost only 1 of their last 12 league games to lift them out of the relegation zone, ultimately staying up on goal difference on the last day of the season after a 0–0 draw with already relegated Bradford City. On 25 September 2019, Glyn Hodges took over the management of the first team on a temporary basis following the suspension of Wally Downes after being charged by the FA for betting misconduct. In March 2020, the 2019–20 season was suspended as a result of the COVID-19 pandemic, with AFC Wimbledon sat three points outside the relegation zone. The final table was ultimately decided by points per game, which saw the club record a second successive 20th-placed finish.

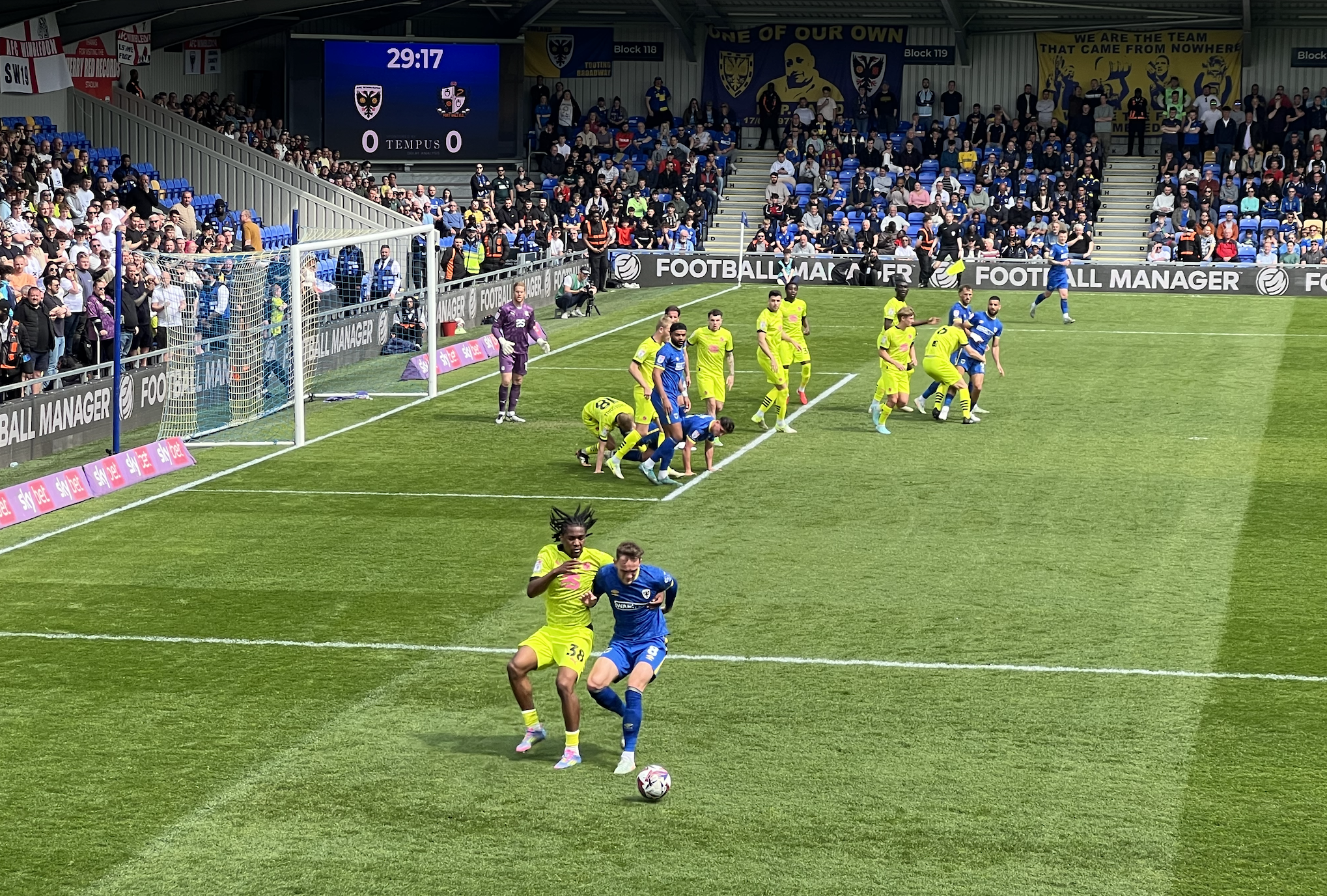
AFC Wimbledon playing at Plough Lane on 26 April 2025.

=== Plough Lane (2020–present) ===
In November 2020, the club moved to Plough Lane, a new stadium, only 250 yards away from the original Plough Lane, Wimbledon's home until 1991. The club played its first match at the new stadium on the evening of 3 November 2020; a 2–2 draw against Doncaster Rovers, with the first goal at the ground being scored by Wimbledon striker Joe Pigott. The club's youth coach, Mark Robinson, replaced Hodges on 30 January 2021, with AFC Wimbledon sat in the relegation zone after a run of poor results; Robinson turned the season around and the club avoided relegation on the second-last matchday.

On 14 August 2021, AFC Wimbledon played their first competitive game at Plough Lane in front of a crowd; a 3–3 draw against Bolton Wanderers. Despite a steady start to the 2021–22 season, the club failed to win a single game after 7 December, with Robinson leaving the club March 2022. Mark Bowen was subsequently appointed as manager until the end of the season, however he was unable to end the club's winless run, and Wimbledon were relegated from League One after six seasons, finishing in 23rd position.

Ahead of the 2022–23 season, former Charlton Athletic boss Johnnie Jackson was appointed as the club's new manager. AFC Wimbledon had a mixed start to their return to League Two, winning just three of their first 13 games of the season, before going on a ten match unbeaten run. However, they won just once in their last 19 games, ultimately ending the season in 21st place. The following year marked an improvement, with the club challenging for the play-offs. On 2 March 2024, AFC Wimbledon recorded their first victory over Milton Keynes Dons at Plough Lane, winning 1–0 courtesy of a stoppage time goal scored by Ronan Curtis. Wimbledon's play-off hopes were ended by defeat in their penultimate game, and they recorded a 10th-placed finish.

The 2024–25 season season began with AFC Wimbledon winning four of their first six league games, before having a number of games postponed as a result of a sinkhole on the Plough Lane pitch. The club spent the majority of the season in the top seven, and secured a place in the play-offs with a victory away at Grimsby Town on the final day. In the play-off semi final, AFC Wimbledon beat Notts County 2–0 on aggregate, before defeating Walsall 1–0 in the final at Wembley Stadium to secure promotion back to League One after a three-year absence.

== Crest and colours ==
The club crest, which is based on the coat of arms of the Municipal Borough of Wimbledon, features a black double headed eagle in reference to a local legend that Julius Caesar once made camp on Wimbledon Common, this symbol being his own attributed coat of arms.

The colours that were chosen for the AFC Wimbledon kit were the royal blue and yellow traditionally associated with the rise of the original Wimbledon to the top of the Football League (rather than the darker navy blue and yellow that Wimbledon were wearing at the time, which had been a recent adaptation in 1993). The first ever kit, which was used only during the pre-season friendlies of 2002, consisted of a royal blue shirt, white shorts and white socks. Since then, the home kit has always been predominantly all royal blue with yellow detailing. The away kit used between 2002 and 2004 was white, however since then it has usually been predominantly yellow with blue detailing.

To mark their first game in the Football League on 6 August 2011 against Bristol Rovers, the team wore a white and blue commemorative kit which was based on that worn by the original Wimbledon during 1977–78 in order to remember their own first season as a member of the Football League in the old Fourth Division (now League Two). To prevent copyright infringement, a single blue stripe replaced the three trade mark stripes of the Adidas original and the shirts were emblazoned with a modified crest for the occasion.

On 14 May 2020, the club released a new, slightly modified, official club crest to mark 32 years since Wimbledon's 1988 FA Cup victory, as well as the forthcoming opening of the new stadium at Plough Lane.

=== Sponsorship and kit manufacturer ===
Period	Kit manufacturer	Shirt sponsor
2002 (pre season)	Umbro	Championship Manager
2002–2012	Tempest Sports	Sports Interactive
2012–2014	Tempest Sports	Football Manager (Sports Interactive)
2014–2018	Admiral	Football Manager (Sports Interactive)
2018–2022	Puma	Football Manager (Sports Interactive)
2022–2023	Hummel	Football Manager (Sports Interactive)
2023–2024	Umbro	Football Manager (Sports Interactive)
2024–2025	Umbro	War Child
2025–	Lotto	Football Manager (Sports Interactive) (Home); War Child (Away); Private Office Asset Management (Third)

AFC Wimbledon's shirts have been sponsored by computer games developer Sports Interactive since the club's inception in 2002.

The current kit used by the club is manufactured by Lotto. Previous manufacturers have been Umbro (2002, 2023–2025), Tempest Sports (2002–2014), Admiral Sportswear (2014–2018), Puma (2018–2022), and Hummel (2022–2023). Other club sponsors are Cherry Red Records, and author and YouTuber John Green. As part of Green's sponsorship, the Nerdfighteria emblem is displayed on the back of the playing shorts.

In April 2022, the club announced that it would be switching its kit manufacturer for start of the 2022–23 season to Hummel, a nostalgic link up with the kit manufacturer of the former Wimbledon in three seasons from 1988–89 to 1990–91. On 6 March 2023, AFC Wimbledon announced they would be switching kit manufacturer from Hummel to Umbro due to Hummel UK distributor Elite Sports Group going into bankruptcy administration.

In July 2024, Sports Interactive announced a partnership between the club and War Child, and gifted its shirt sponsorship to the charity for all three kits.

In April 2025, the club announced a three-year partnership Lotto to produce its kits from the 2025–26 season onwards. In June 2025, the club announced that Sports Interactive's sponsorship would continue, with the Football Manager logo returning to the home shirt, and charity partner War Child continuing on the away shirt. Wealth management firm Private Office Asset Management was also revealed to be the third kit sponsor, after Sports Interactive gifted its sponsorship space back to the club.

== Mascot ==
"Haydon", the mascot of AFC Wimbledon.

In 2006, AFC Wimbledon introduced a new mascot to represent the club, a Womble known as "Haydon" after Haydons Road, the nearest railway station to both Wimbledon's original home ground, Plough Lane (1912–98), and the current Plough Lane.

When the club relocated to Milton Keynes in 2003 permission to use the then mascot Wandle the Womble was not renewed as owners of the Wombles brand no longer wished to be associated with Wimbledon FC.

== Rivalries ==
=== Milton Keynes Dons ===
The most obvious of AFC Wimbledon's rivals are Milton Keynes Dons, the club which resulted from the relocation of Wimbledon to Milton Keynes in 2003. However, there is some debate amongst AFC Wimbledon supporters as to whether this should be considered a rivalry. Since some supporters do not recognise the legitimacy of the club, it is argued they cannot be considered rivals. The two sides have met four times in cup competitions, all games at Milton Keynes, of which AFC Wimbledon have won one and one game went to penalties. Owing to MK Dons' relegation from the Championship in the 2015–16 season, alongside AFC Wimbledon's promotion from League Two, AFC Wimbledon and Milton Keynes Dons competed in the same league division for the first time in the 2016–17 season. Both clubs won one and lost one of the games between them in that season's league matches. In the total of nine league matches played between the clubs up to May 2025, Wimbledon won one, drew three, and lost five.

=== Crawley Town ===
One of AFC Wimbledon's main rivals have been Crawley Town. This is purely due to their frequently fractious meetings at a non-League level since 2009. The two sides did not play each other between 2012 and 2015 due to Crawley's promotion to League One. However, Crawley's relegation during the 2014–15 season meant the two sides played each other on 15 August 2015 which the Dons won 2–1. Between Wimbledon's 2016 promotion into League One and 2022 relegation into League Two, they met just once competitively in the second round of the 2020–21 FA Cup with Crawley Town winning 2–1. With both teams back in the same league since the 2022–23 season, they have met two times, with the home team winning each fixture.

=== Sutton United ===
Sometimes known as the Thameslink derby, after the train operator that serves both locales. AFC Wimbledon had never shared a league with Sutton United before 2022, but due to the geographical proximity the two clubs share a friendly rivalry. Sutton were the first team to play the reformed Dons on 10 July 2002, defeating them 4–0 at Gander Green Lane. Before they met in the FA Cup in 2017, the most recent competitive match between the two sides was in the 2013 Surrey Senior Cup semi-final at Gander Green Lane on 11 April 2013, a game which Sutton won 5–2. The clubs played each other in the third round of the FA Cup on 7 January 2017, which resulted in a 0–0 draw. The replay took place at Kingsmeadow on 17 January 2017, with Sutton winning 3–1. The two clubs were both be in League Two for the 2022–23 season.

== Stadium ==
=== Plough Lane ===
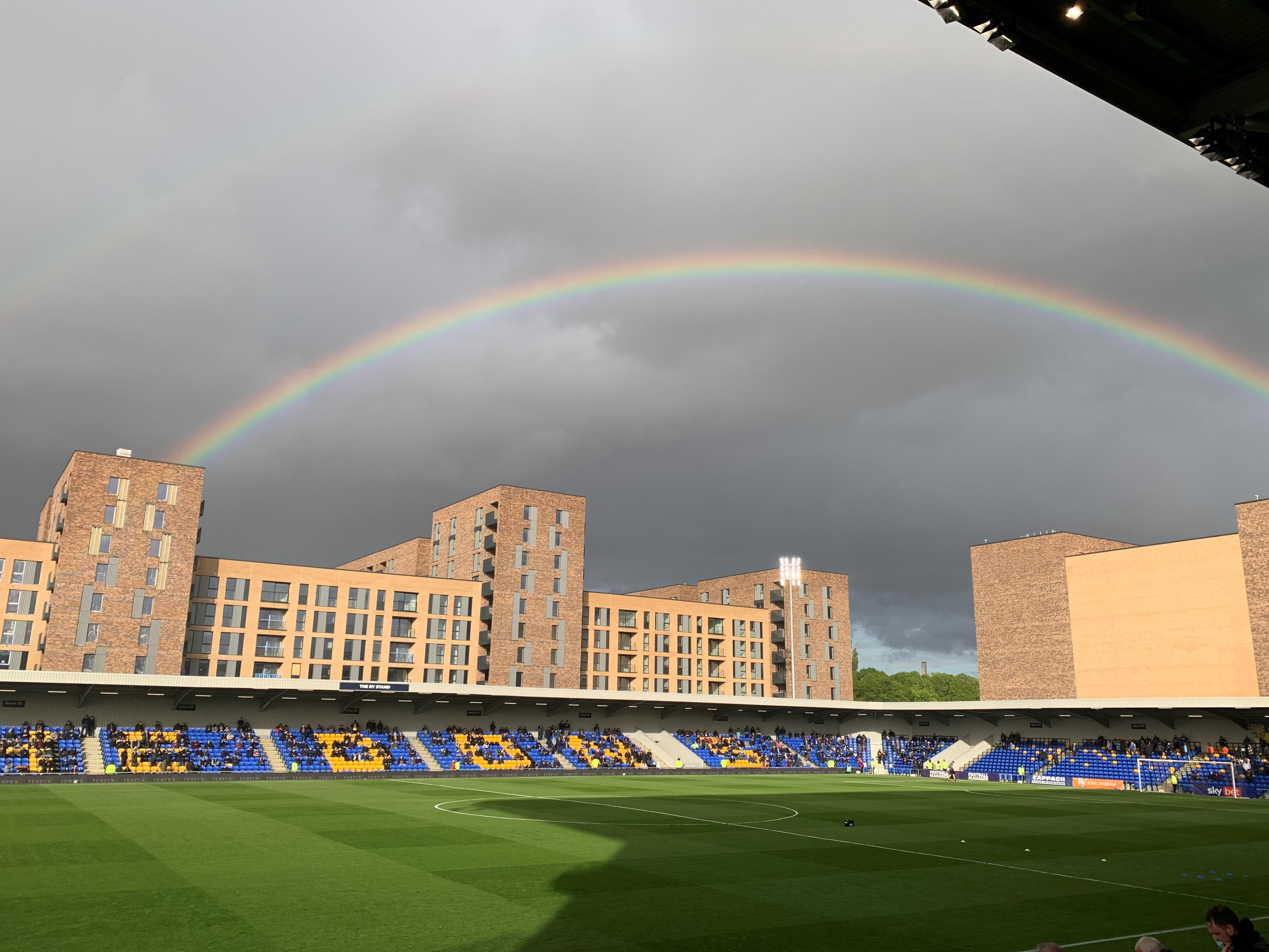
Plough Lane's first match with spectators, 18 May 2021

Since its inception in 2002, AFC Wimbledon had stated that one of its primary aims was to play in Merton, with a new stadium close to what it regards as its "spiritual home" of the original Plough Lane, where the original Wimbledon had played for over 80 years. This aim formed the basis of a project to create a new purpose-built stadium on the site of the Wimbledon Greyhound Stadium, located on Plough Lane approximately 250 yards from where the old football stadium had stood.

Plans to develop the greyhound stadium site as either a multi-purpose stadium or as a football stadium were publicised frequently by the club and the media prior to 2013. In 2013, AFC Wimbledon announced that discussions were underway with Merton Council over a joint bid for the greyhound stadium and surrounding land, in cooperation with developer Galliard Homes, to build a new football stadium, 600 residential units and a wide range of shops and community facilities.

The plans for the football stadium were approved unanimously by Merton Council on 10 December 2015. Clearance of the site in preparation for the new football stadium and housing was begun on 16 March 2018. The stadium's opening was initially planned for summer 2019, however, delays caused the approximate completion date to be moved to 25 October 2020. The land's freehold was transferred to an AFC Wimbledon subsidiary on 24 December 2018, among other transactions that also formally transferred ownership of Kingsmeadow to Chelsea. The new stadium has an initial capacity of 9,215, with the option of expansion to a maximum 20,000 at a later date.

Wimbledon played the first four home matches of the 2020–21 season at Loftus Road whilst Plough Lane was being completed. The club played its first match at Plough Lane on the evening of 3 November 2020 with a 2–2 draw against Doncaster Rovers.

=== Loftus Road ===
AFC Wimbledon started the 2020–21 season at Loftus Road, after agreeing a temporary groundshare agreement with Queens Park Rangers, while construction of Plough Lane was completed. They played four league games at the ground, plus two cup ties, before departing at the end of October 2020. Due to the coronavirus restrictions in place at that time, all of the club's games at Loftus Road were played behind closed doors.

=== Kingsmeadow ===
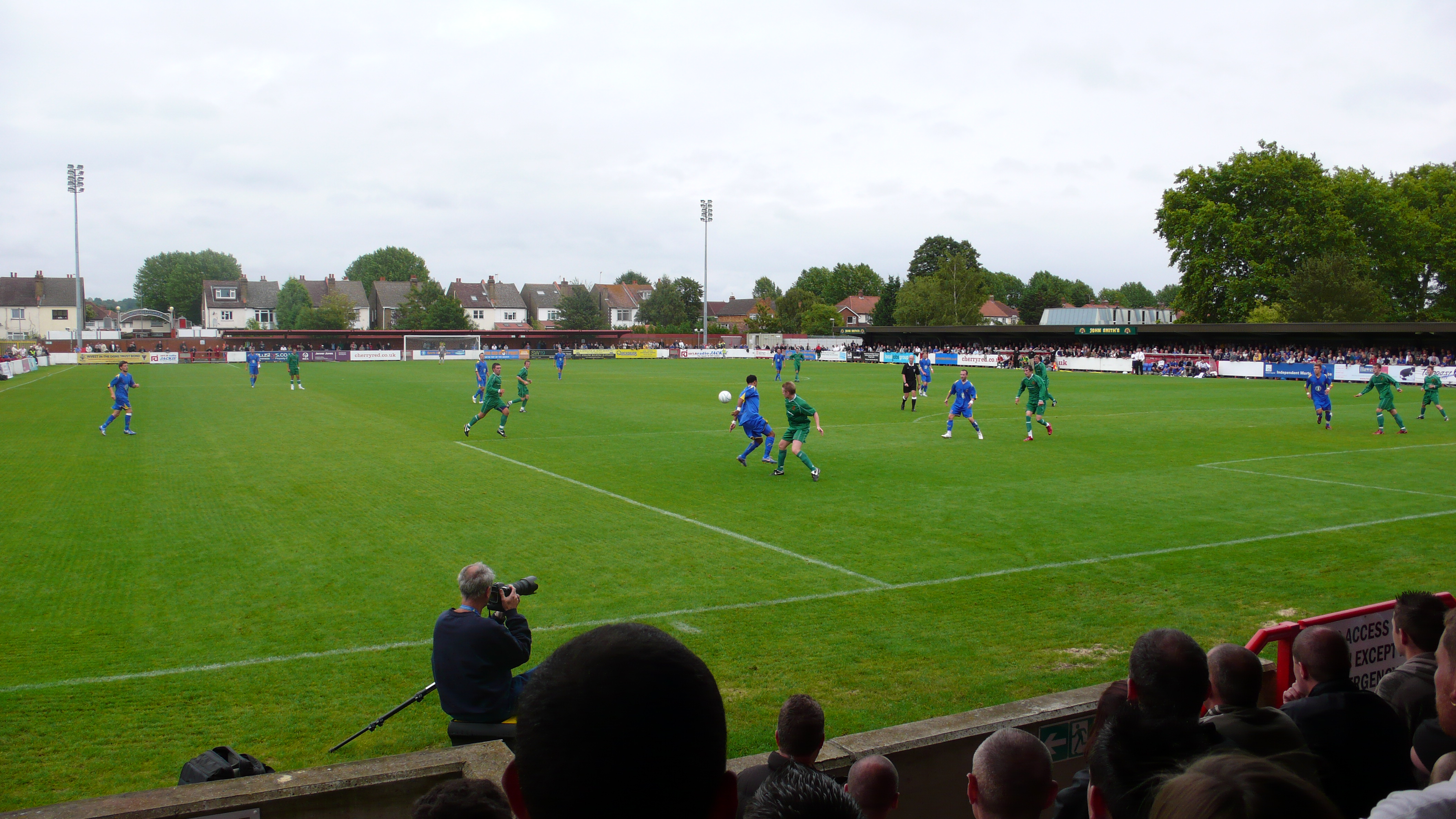
Kingsmeadow on 18 August 2007 as AFC Wimbledon beat Ramsgate 2–0 in their first league fixture of the 2007–08 season in the Isthmian League Premier Division.

The club played at the 4,850 capacity Kingsmeadow in Kingston upon Thames until May 2020. Until 2017, AFC Wimbledon groundshared with Kingstonian with the Dons being the landlords and Kingstonian the tenants since the summer of 2003; before then the roles were reversed. In November 2015, AFC Wimbledon supporters voted to approve the selling of Kingsmeadow to Chelsea to help fund a planned new ground in Merton, On 13 December 2017, the contract was signed for the new stadium to be built, with Kingstonian leaving the ground in 2017 as a result.

==== Ground purchase and debt ====
Upon their foundation in 2002, AFC Wimbledon entered into a ground–sharing arrangement with Kingstonian to play home fixtures at Kingsmeadow in the neighbouring borough of Kingston upon Thames.

After Kingstonian entered administration to avoid bankruptcy and lost the Kingsmeadow lease in October 2001, it was assigned in April 2002 by the administrators to a property developer, Rajesh Khosla, who was also by then owner of the club.

After an SGM, it was felt by the AFC Wimbledon board of directors that securing ownership of Kingsmeadow would safeguard the ground for the future of both clubs. In March 2003, the Dons Trust members voted to purchase part of the lease for Kingsmeadow and in June 2003 the contract for buying the lease to the stadium was agreed with Rajesh Khosla; £3 million needed to be raised.

AFC Wimbledon were already sub-tenants at Kingsmeadow, before raising £2.4 million to buy the lease from Khosla in June 2003, with a view to making Kingsmeadow their home. Kingstonian secured a 25-year sub-tenancy agreement with AFC Wimbledon, with customary break clauses. The clubs operated a ground-sharing arrangement, with Kingstonian receiving preferentially cheap rental terms.

==== Expansion ====
At the end of the 2011–12 season, AFC Wimbledon commenced work on building a new 1,000 capacity all-seater stand to replace the existing Kingston Road End. This was completed by 13 October 2012 game against Cheltenham Town which saw an attendance of 4,409. The new stand was named the North Stand before being renamed The Nongshim Stand and in July 2015 the John Green Stand following sponsorship deals. The work increased the stadium capacity to approximately 4,850 with 2,265 seats.

==== Sale ====
In 2015, AFC Wimbledon agreed plans to sell Kingsmeadow to Chelsea in order to help finance their plans to move to a new stadium in Merton. Chelsea's intention was to use the ground for their own youth and women's teams and were not willing to accommodate Kingstonian. This was met with protests from Kingstonian fans, as the club would be left without a home ground of their own. Since the sale, Kingstonian have had to groundshare with Leatherhead and then Corinthian-Casuals. AFC Wimbledon departed Kingsmeadow in May 2020.

== Ownership and legal status ==
AFCW plc was placed under the ownership of The Dons Trust, a supporters' group which is pledged to retain at least 75% control of that ownership. In 2003, a minority interest was sold in a share issue in order to finance the purchase of Kingsmeadow.

The Dons Trust is an industrial and provident society registered with the Financial Services Authority as "Wimbledon Football Club Supporters' Society Limited". This is not to be confused with Wimbledon Independent Supporters Association (WISA) although WISA has as one of its stated constitutional aims "to purchase shares in AFC Wimbledon's holding company".

The original chief executive was Erik Samuelson, a retired accountant, who carried out his full-time duties in return for the nominal sum of one guinea a year, because "it sounded posher than a pound". Samuelson retired in 2019; he was replaced by the club's former COO, Joe Palmer.

On the 9th of April 2026, The Dons Trust members voted to reduce the ownership number from 75% to 50.01% and removed the 15% minority cap of individual owners of the club as well.

== Community work ==
The club places great emphasis on its role as a social focus for the entire local community, and part of this role is to offer the chance to play football to all. For this reason AFC Wimbledon established the Community Football Scheme (CFS) in 2004. On 1 May 2010, AFC Wimbledon's Community Football Scheme was awarded the FA Charter Standard Community Club Award, the highest graded award attainable in the FA Charter Standard Club Programme, in recognition of the club's outstanding coaching facilities in the local community. The club offer a number of different football courses open to children of any ability aged 4–14, who receive coaching from FA qualified coaches. The club aim to reach as many children as possible through their football and multi-sports programme by having vital links with their surrounding boroughs, most notably Merton and Kingston, which has allowed them to become one of the main providers of sports coaching in their local community.

AFC Wimbledon also offers a Schools Coaching Programme in Merton, Kingston and neighbouring boroughs. The club look to encourage a healthy and active lifestyle for both Primary and Secondary school children through football and a range of other sports. The sessions are run with an emphasis on learning, development and health awareness in a fun coaching environment. On 15 March 2012, coaches from the CFS, in partnership with the Football League's main sponsor nPower, engaged in a community outreach scheme promoting the FA's 'Respect' campaign to school pupils. Nearly 2,000 children aged 10 and 11 were taught how abusive verbal and physical behaviour on the pitch to both players and referees should never be tolerated under any circumstances. The aim of the nationwide 'Respect' scheme in schools is to eradicate racism, homophobia, violence and dissent from the next generation of footballers and supporters.

On 27 March 2012, AFC Wimbledon became the first football club to be presented with the Prime Minister's Big Society Award for outstanding contributions to the local community. The club was recognised for the honour because it offers a wide range of community development schemes including 19 youth and women's teams, school health and sport projects (hundreds of children a week participate in the outreach schemes provided) and a range of innovative activities, including a stadium school to help children get to grips with maths by using football as a teaching aid.

Congratulating AFC Wimbledon on receiving the award, then Prime Minister David Cameron said:

The team behind AFC Wimbledon have not just given fans a local club to support, but much more than this, they have united a community, given them the chance to have a real stake in their club's future and made a huge difference to the lives of many people in the area at the same time. Football is a team game, and AFC Wimbledon have shown just what can happen when people don't just sit on the sidelines, but choose to get involved and really pull together – a great example of the Big Society. Congratulations to AFC Wimbledon and all their fans and supporters whose determination and devotion has created a community-owned club that has gone from strength to strength.

Accepting the award, Erik Samuelson, chief executive of AFC Wimbledon stated:

This club's achievements show that a co-operatively owned football club can be faithful to its high ethical standards, keep a keen focus on community involvement, be financially sustainable – and still be successful on the pitch. Everyone who has contributed to the club's success and this award should be very proud.

— Erik Samuelson, statement on the Number 10 official website

A group formed by the club's fans, the Dons Local Action Group, stepped up during the COVID-19 pandemic in 2020, ensuring community members were distributed sufficient food and that students locked down at home had the technology they needed to keep up with classes.

== Players ==
=== Current squad ===
As of 7 September 2026

Note: Flags indicate national team as defined under FIFA eligibility rules; some limited exceptions apply. Players may hold more than one non-FIFA nationality.

No.	Pos.	Nation	Player
1	GK	ENG	Nathan Bishop
2	DF	TCA	Steven Sessegnon
3	DF	ENG	Steve Seddon
5	MF	ENG	Ollie Harrison (on loan from Chelsea)
6	DF	NIR	Ryan Johnson (captain)
7	FW	ENG	James Tilley
8	MF	ENG	Callum Maycock
9	FW	ENG	Jayden Stockley
10	MF	ENG	Zack Nelson
11	MF	ENG	Marcus Browne
12	MF	ENG	Alistair Smith
14	FW	ENG	Matty Stevens
15	DF	ENG	Freddie Simmonds (on loan from Brighton & Hove Albion)
17	DF	GHA	Andy Yiadom
18	MF	JAM	Delano McCoy-Splatt
19	FW	ENG	Donnell McNeilly (on loan from Nottingham Forest)

No.	Pos.	Nation	Player
20	GK	ENG	Joe McDonnell
21	MF	GRN	Myles Hippolyte
22	DF	ENG	Riley Horan
23	FW	ENG	Harry Cornick
25	DF	ENG	Sam Goma
26	DF	ENG	Dan Sweeney
27	FW	ENG	Ed Leach
28	MF	ENG	Joe Kirby
29	MF	NOR	Aron Sasu
31	FW	JAM	Dujuan Richards (on loan from Chelsea)
33	DF	ENG	Isaac Ogundere
34	MF	ENG	Harry Hedges
37	FW	ENG	Robin Ashamu
38	MF	ENG	Finlay Fraser
39	GK	ENG	Josef Bursik (on loan from Portsmouth)

=== Out on loan ===
Note: Flags indicate national team as defined under FIFA eligibility rules; some limited exceptions apply. Players may hold more than one non-FIFA nationality.

No.	Pos.	Nation	Player
4	MF	ENG	Jake Reeves (at Barnet until 30 June 2027)
24	DF	ENG	Harry Sidwell (at Eastleigh until 30 June 2027)

No.	Pos.	Nation	Player
32	MF	ENG	Kai Jennings (at Crawley Town until 30 June 2027)

For youth teams see AFC Wimbledon Development Squad and Academy.

=== Player of the year, club captains and top scorers ===
The following table shows players who have previously been selected to be club captain, have been The Wimbledon Independent Supporters Association (WISA) player of the year and have been the player who scored the most league goals in a season (including penalties) in chronological order:

Season	Club captain	Player of the year	Top scorer	Goals
2002–03	(England) Joe Sheerin	(England) Kevin Cooper	(England) Kevin Cooper	37
2003–04	(England) Joe Sheerin	(England) Matt Everard	(England) Kevin Cooper	53
2004–05	(England) Steve Butler	(England) Richard Butler	(England) Richard Butler	24
2005–06	(England) Steve Butler	(England) Andy Little	(New Zealand) Shane Smeltz	19
2006–07	(England) Chris Gell	(England) Antony Howard	(England) Roscoe Dsane	17
2007–08	(England) Jason Goodliffe	(England) Jason Goodliffe	(Scotland) Steven Ferguson	10
2008–09	(England) Jason Goodliffe	(England) Ben Judge	(England) Jon Main	33
2009–10	(England) Paul Lorraine	(England) Danny Kedwell	(England) Danny Kedwell	21
2010–11	(England) Danny Kedwell	(England) Sam Hatton	(England) Danny Kedwell	23
2011–12	(England) Jamie Stuart	(England) Sammy Moore	(England) Jack Midson	18
2012–13	(England) Mat Mitchel-King	(England) Jack Midson	(England) Jack Midson	13
2013–14	(Republic of Ireland) Alan Bennett	(England) Barry Fuller	(England) Michael Smith	9
2014–15	(England) Barry Fuller	(England) Adebayo Akinfenwa	(England) Adebayo Akinfenwa	13
2015–16	(England) Barry Fuller	(England) Paul Robinson	(Montserrat) Lyle Taylor	23
2016–17	(England) Barry Fuller	(England) Tom Elliott	(Montserrat) Lyle Taylor	14
2017–18	(England) Barry Fuller	(England) Deji Oshilaja	(Montserrat) Lyle Taylor	18
2018–19	(England) Deji Oshilaja	(England) Will Nightingale	(England) Joe Pigott	15
2019–20	(England) Will Nightingale	(England) Terell Thomas	(Finland) Marcus Forss	11
2020–21	(England) Alex Woodyard	(England) Joe Pigott	(England) Joe Pigott	22
2021–22	(England) Alex Woodyard	(England) Jack Rudoni	(England) Jack Rudoni	12
2022–23	(England) Alex Woodyard	(Iraq) Ali Al-Hamadi	(South Africa) Ethan Chislett	11
2023–24	(England) Jake Reeves	(England) Jack Currie	(Iraq) Ali Al-Hamadi	17
2024–25	(England) Jake Reeves	(England) Josh Neufville	(England) Matty Stevens	17

=== Most league appearances and goals ===
For a list of all AFC Wimbledon players who hold appearance or goal-scoring records see List of AFC Wimbledon records and statistics.

=== Wimbledon Old Players Association ===
As part of WISA's campaign to try and reclaim the history of Wimbledon Football Club, the Wimbledon Old Players Association (WOPA) was formed in 2005. Membership of WOPA is open to all former Wimbledon and AFC Wimbledon players and managers. Among the sixty founding members were Glenn Mulcaire, who scored AFC Wimbledon's first ever goal in 2002 and Kevin Cooper, who remains the club's all-time highest goal scorer with 107 goals between August 2002 and May 2004, as well as retaining the title for the most goals scored in a season with 66 during 2003–04. Others that joined included some of the legends of the old Wimbledon, such as John Fashanu, Dave Beasant, Efan Ekoku, Neil Sullivan, Dave Bassett, Wally Downes, Marcus Gayle, Neal Ardley, Alan Kimble, Andy Thorn, Roger Joseph, Dickie Guy, Allen Batsford, Roger Connell, Ian Cooke, Roy Law and Steve Galliers. On 16 July 2006, WOPA fielded a team in the Masters Football Tournament at Wembley Arena, with AFC Wimbledon's backing. The team included Carlton Fairweather, Scott Fitzgerald, Marcus Gayle and Dean Holdsworth.

In June 2010, Vinnie Jones, another former player of Wimbledon, donated his 1988 FA Cup winners medal to the fans of AFC Wimbledon. The medal is on display at Wimbledon in Sporting History's Museum at Plough Lane.

== Management ==
=== Current management and coaching staff ===
Name	Role
(England) Johnnie Jackson	Manager
(England) Terry Skiverton	Assistant manager
Robert Tuvey	First-team coach
Andy Parslow	First Team Restarts / Set Piece Coach
Dave Reddington	Individual Coach
Steve Sallis	Head of Mindset Performance
Chris McConnell	Sports scientist
(England) Ashley Bayes	Goalkeeping coach
Bobby Bacic	Physiotherapist
Katy Bignell	Assistant Sports Therapist
Robin Bedford	Kit Manager

=== Current academy and youth development staff ===
Name	Role
Michael Hamilton	Academy manager
Michael Cook	Academy Head of Operations
Anthony Ferguson	Head of Coaching
Simon Clark	Under 18s Head Coach
Jack Matthews	Lead Youth Phase Coach (U13-16)
Nicholas Wright	Lead Foundation Phase Coach
Liam Connor	Head of physical performance
Victoria Athey	Physical Performance and Medicine Manager
Stuart Page	Head of Education
Ben Foshuene	Head of Academy Talent ID
Ahmed Jama	Head of Academy Performance Analysis
Deji Olorukoba-Oseni	Academy Administrator

=== Managerial history ===
As of 4 March 2024

These statistics incorporate results for league matches (including Play-off matches) and results in all major League Cup competitions (including the Combined Counties League Premier Challenge Cup, the Isthmian League Cup, the Conference League Cup, the Football League Cup and the Football League Trophy) as well as results in the FA Vase, the FA Trophy and the FA Cup.

Name	From	Until	Managed	Won	Drawn	Lost	Win %	Honours
(England) Terry Eames	13 June 2002	13 February 2004*	82	69	4	9	84.15	
Nicky English	13 February 2004	11 May 2004	21	19	2	0	90.48	2003–04 Combined Counties League Premier Division Champions; 2003–04 Combined Counties League Premier Challenge Cup winners
(Northern Ireland) Dave Anderson	11 May 2004	2 May 2007	167	98	40	29	58.68	2004–05 Isthmian League First Division Champions
(England) Terry Brown	15 May 2007	19 September 2012	270	133	54	83	49.26	2007–08 Isthmian League Premier Division play-off winners 2008–09 Conference South Champions; 2010–11 Conference National play-off winners
(England) Simon Bassey (caretaker)	19 September 2012	10 October 2012	4	2	0	2	50.00	
(England) Neal Ardley	10 October 2012	12 November 2018	326	108	91	127	33.13	2015–16 Football League Two play-off winners
(England) Simon Bassey (caretaker)	12 November 2018	4 December 2018	5	2	0	3	40.00	
(England) Wally Downes	4 December 2018	25 September 2019**	41	11	12	18	26.82	
(Wales) Glyn Hodges	25 September 2019	30 January 2021	62	18	18	26	29.00	
(England) Mark Robinson	30 January 2021	28 March 2022	70	18	23	29	25.71	
(Wales) Mark Bowen (caretaker)	30 March 2022	7 May 2022	7	0	4	3	00.00	
(England) Johnnie Jackson	16 May 2022		101	35	27	39	34.65	2024–25 EFL League Two play-off winners

* Terry Eames was suspended as manager on 13 February for disciplinary reasons, but was not officially dismissed until 18 February 2004. Following his suspension, the role was undertaken by his assistant Nicky English.

** Wally Downes was suspended as manager on 25 September 2019 after he was charged by the Football Association over bets placed on games, with his assistant Glyn Hodges taking over his duties. Downes was not officially dismissed until 20 October 2019, when he was suspended by the FA after admitting breaching Football Association rules around betting. Hodges was then named his permanent replacement.

=== Restarts coach and substitution coach ===
In spring 2021, AFC Wimbledon appointed Andy Parslow as restarts coach, becoming the first English Football League club to appoint a specialist restarts coach. In summer 2021, AFC Wimbledon appointed Sammy Landers as substitution coach, becoming the English Football League club to appoint a specialist substitution coach.

== Women ==
AFC Wimbledon Women switched affiliation from Wimbledon after the 2002–03 season.

Kevin Foster is the manager and the team competes in the FA Women's National League South.

Wimbledon Women's former player Sophie Hosking won an Olympic gold medal for Team GB in the women's lightweight double sculls at the London 2012 games. Hosking continues to be an avid supporter of AFC Wimbledon and demonstrated as such when she painted her fingernails in the club's royal blue and yellow colours for the Olympic final at Dorney Lake on 4 August 2012.

== Records ==
AFC Wimbledon's club records include the following:

- Best FA Cup performance: 5th round, 2018–19
- Best EFL Cup performance: 3rd round, 2021–22, 2024–25
- Best EFL Trophy performance: Quarter-finals, 2020–21, 2023–24, 2025–26
- Best FA Trophy performance: 3rd round, 2007–08, 2009–10
- Best FA Vase performance: 4th round, 2003–04

== Honours ==
AFC Wimbledon's honours include the following:

League

- League Two (level 4)
  - Play-off winners: 2016, 2025
- Conference (level 5)
  - Play-off winners: 2011
- Conference South (level 6)
  - Champions: 2008–09
- Isthmian League
  - Play-off winners: 2008
- Isthmian League Division One
  - Champions: 2004–05
- Combined Counties League
  - Champions: 2003–04

Cup

- Combined Counties League Premier Challenge Cup
  - Winners: 2003–04
- Isle of Man Tournament
  - Winners: 2009–10
- Lanes Cup
  - Winners: 2007–08 2011–12
- London Senior Cup
  - Winners: 2013–14
- Surrey Senior Cup
  - Winners: 2004–05
