= Simon Bassey =

English footballer

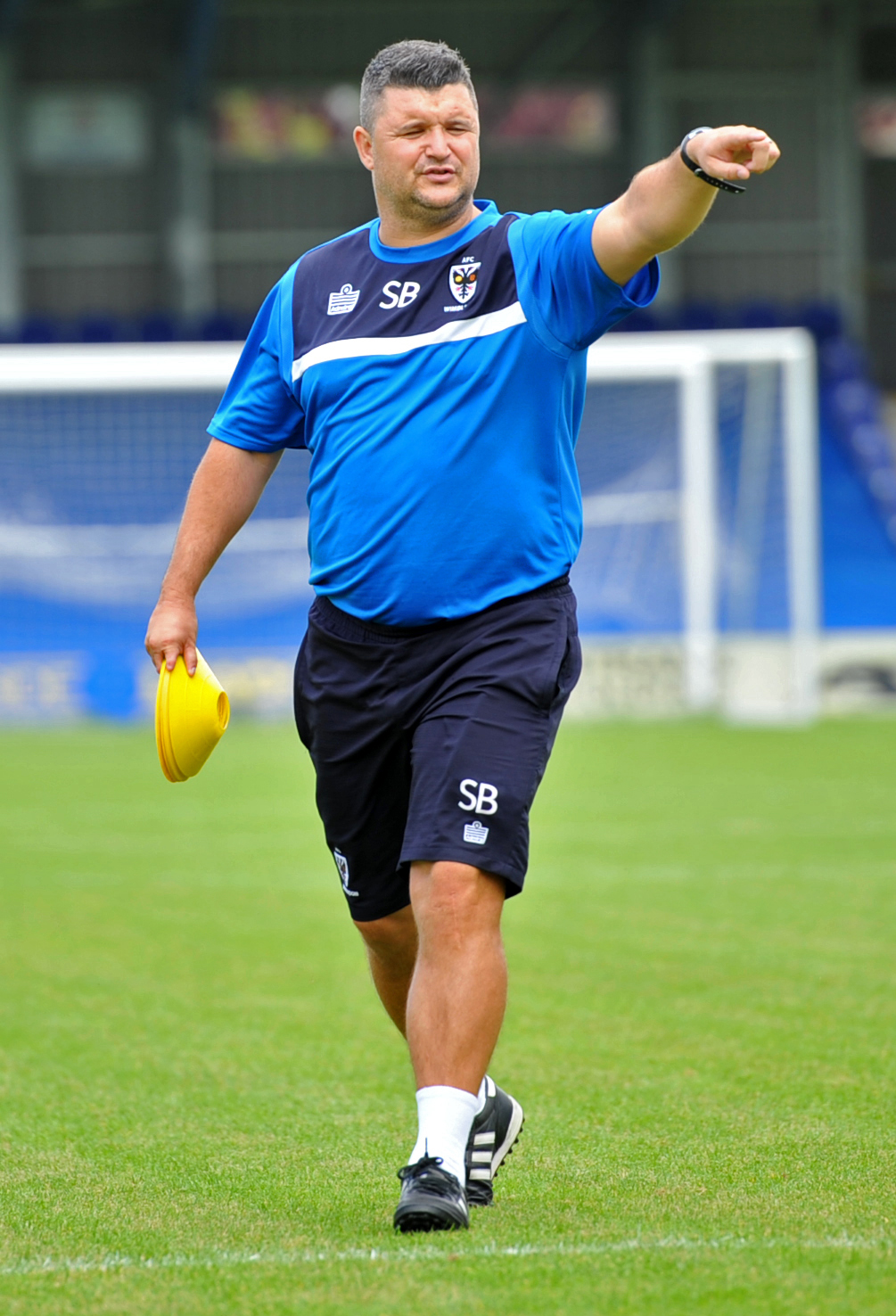
- Bassey as a coach of AFC Wimbledon in 2015

Personal information
- Full name: Simon James Bassey
- Date of birth: 5 February 1976 (age 50)
- Place of birth: Lambeth, England
- Height: 1.72 m (5 ft 7 1/2 in)
- Position: Midfielder

Team information
- Current team: Woking (assistant head coach)

Youth career
- 1984–1992: Wimbledon
- 1992–1994: Charlton Athletic

Senior career*
Years	Team	Apps	(Gls)
1994–1997	Carshalton Athletic	?	(?)
1997–2000	Aldershot Town	49	(1)
2000	Carshalton Athletic	?	(?)
2000–2001	Dulwich Hamlet	?	(?)
2001–2002	Carshalton Athletic	?	(?)
2002	Crawley Town	?	(?)
2002	Tooting & Mitcham United	?	(?)
2002–2004	AFC Wimbledon	46	(1)

Managerial career
- 2012: AFC Wimbledon (caretaker)
- 2018: AFC Wimbledon (caretaker)
- 2021: Barnet (interim)
- 2023: Portsmouth (interim)
- * Club domestic league appearances and goals as of 17:47, 8 December 2012 (UTC)

Simon James Bassey (born 5 February 1976) is an English former footballer. During his playing career he played as a midfielder. He is currently assistant head coach at Woking.

== Career ==
=== Playing career ===
Bassey joined Wimbledon F.C. at the age of 8 and remained with the club until he was released at the age of 16. He made over 150 appearances for Carshalton Athletic as well as playing for Aldershot Town and AFC Wimbledon.

=== Coaching career ===
He went on to become first team coach at AFC Wimbledon when he retired due to injury in 2004. He acted as caretaker manager of the club between 19 September 2012 and 10 October 2012, before resuming his post as coach following the appointment of Neal Ardley. He again took over as caretaker manager on 12 November 2018 after the departure of Neal Ardley and Neil Cox. He left the club by mutual consent at the end of the 2018-19 season.

On 7 April 2021, Bassey was appointed First Team Coach at National League side Barnet, initially as the most senior coach for the first team and leading the team in training and on matchdays. Bassey left the Bees at the end of the season to pursue an opportunity with an English Football League club.

Two days later he was announced as first team assistant coach at Portsmouth. Bassey became interim head coach at Portsmouth on 3 January 2023 after Danny Cowley was dismissed the previous day. Simon Bassey departed on 20 January 2023 when John Mousinho was appointed as Head Coach by Portsmouth F.C..

In May 2024, Bassey joined League Two club Colchester United as head of recruitment, once again supporting manager Danny Cowley having worked with him at Portsmouth.

In December 2024, following the appointment of Neal Ardley, Bassey was appointed assistant head coach of National League side Woking.

== Managerial statistics ==
As of 20 January 2023

Managerial record by team and tenure
Team	Nat	From	To	Record				
Team	Nat	From	To	G	W	D	L	Win %
AFC Wimbledon	(England)	19 September 2012	10 October 2012	4	2	0	2	50.00
AFC Wimbledon	(England)	12 November 2018	4 December 2018	4	2	0	2	50.00
Barnet	(England)	6 April 2021	3 June 2021	13	5	3	5	38.46
Portsmouth	(England)	3 January 2023	20 January 2023	3	0	0	3	0.00
Total				24	9	3	12	37.50
