= Mark Robinson (football manager) =

Football manager (born 1965)

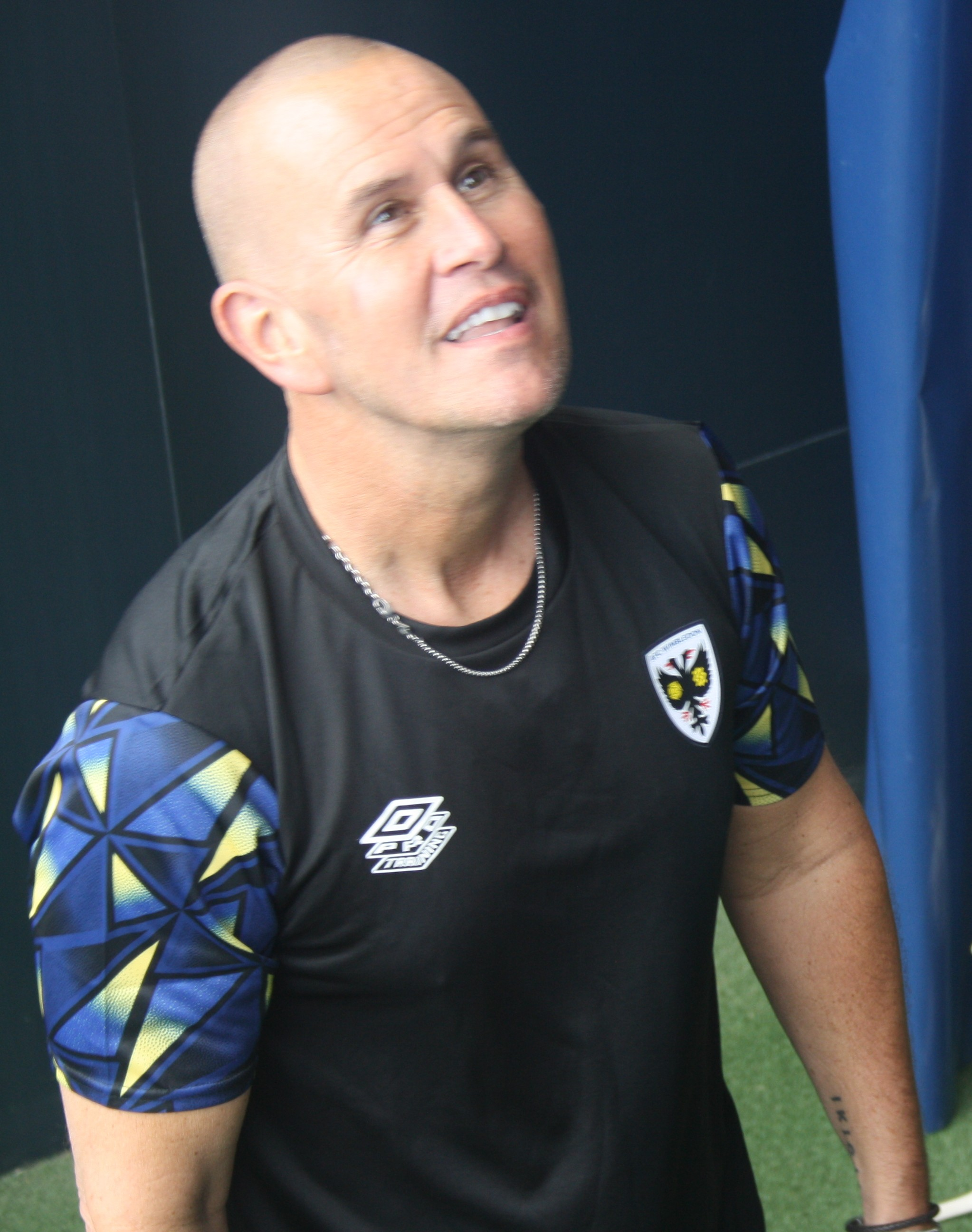
- Mark Robinson in 2025

Personal information
- Date of birth: 1965 (age 60–61)

Youth career
- Years: Team
- Fulham

Managerial career
- 2021–2022: AFC Wimbledon
- 2024: Burton Albion

Mark Robinson is an English football coach, who is currently the Senior Professional Development Phase Lead Coach at Premier League club Ipswich Town.

== Early life ==
Robinson's family had been fans of Chelsea F.C. since the 1940s, and he attended games with his parents and brother from the age of five. Such was his knowledge and love for the club he briefly worked as a part time tour guide at Stamford Bridge to improve his public speaking skills.

== Playing career ==
Robinson was regarded as a highly promising youth player. After captaining Wandsworth District and London, he was scouted by Fulham at a young age while playing in a London Cup final at the old Plough Lane. He went on to captain Fulham at various youth levels.

However, a serious injury—followed by a succession of further injuries over three years—ultimately ended his prospects of playing at a high competitive level.

== Coaching career ==
=== AFC Wimbledon ===
Robinson joined AFC Wimbledon in 2004, two years after the club's formation. On 30 January 2021, following the sacking of Glyn Hodges, Robinson was appointed interim manager of Wimbledon. Robinson had structured the club's hugely successful Academy, having served the club for 18 years in roles from Academy Manager, Head of Coaching to Lead professional phase coach and loans manager. Also managing the youth team for 15 years he led them to successful FA Youth Cup runs beating many Premier League Clubs along the way. On the 17 February 2021, AFC Wimbledon announced the appointment of Robinson on a permanent basis. In the last 21 games he steered the form around dramatically as well as the playing style with the team playing its way out of the relegation zone and to safety, putting together the club's most consecutive wins as a professional football Club.

In the 2021–22 season after the club's best start to a season in eight years, the youngest squad in English football were top scorers in English football after eight games as well as a record run in the EFL Cup which ended with a loss to Arsenal at the Emirates Stadium. A series of injuries including main centre forward Ollie Palmer saw a dip in the Dons' results. Returning players saw their form recaptured before Christmas with three wins and two draws. January saw the Club sell top scorer Ollie Palmer and the Clubs only other forward Aaron Pressley ruled out for the season through injury. A lack of fire power and further injuries to key players saw the Dons become the draw specialists as they went 20 games without a win. On 28 March 2022, AFC Wimbledon parted company with Mark Robinson by mutual consent. Just five days earlier he was publicly backed by the board. The Dons winless form continued without Robinson for the rest of the season and they were later relegated to League Two.

=== Chelsea Development Squad ===
On 22 May 2022, Robinson was announced as the new Head Coach of the Development Squad for Premier League club Chelsea. The season before Robinson was appointed the Chelsea development squad avoided relegation with the last kick of the last game of the season. In Robinson's first season he turned the same squad into title challengers pushing Manchester City for most of the season. This included a five month unbeaten run which was the longest in 23 years for the development squad/reserves. After a disappointing last few games of the season mainly due to players going on loan in January, they eventually finished third behind Manchester City and Liverpool. Lewis Hall progressed to the first team with several appearances as well as Bashir Humphries and Omari Hutchinson making their debuts. In Robinson's second season he steered the development squad to third place in a league of 26 teams. This was achieved with the second youngest squad in the league. A last 16 place was achieved in the international cup and a run to the semi-final in the Premier League Cup. More importantly a club record of seven Premier League debuts were made by young development squad players.

=== Burton Albion ===
After making 23 new signings in the off season, new owners of League One club Burton Albion NFG (Nordic Football Group) head hunted Robinson to lead a long term long project. Hindered by 10 injuries, Albion parted company with Robinson after their first 11 League games brought only 4 draws. His last game was a 3–2 loss at home to top of the table Wycombe Wanderers.

== Managerial statistics ==
As of match played 22 October 2024

Managerial record by team and tenure
Team	From	To	Record					Ref
Team	From	To	P	W	D	L	Win %	Ref
AFC Wimbledon	30 January 2021	28 March 2022	70	18	23	29	25.7	
Burton Albion	4 June 2024	23 October 2024	14	1	4	9	7.1	
Total			84	19	27	38	22.6	
