= Joe Sheerin =

English footballer

Personal information
- Date of birth: 1 February 1979 (age 47)
- Place of birth: Hammersmith, London, England
- Position: Forward

Youth career
- until 1996: Chelsea

Senior career*
| Years | Team | Apps | (Gls) |
| 1996–2000 | Chelsea | 1 | (0) |
| 2000 | AFC Bournemouth | 6 | (1) |
| 2000–2002 | Kingstonian | ? | (?) |
| 2002–2005 | AFC Wimbledon | 85 | (35) |
| 2005 | Croydon Athletic | | |
| 2006 | AFC Wimbledon | | |
| 2006–? | Leatherhead | | |
- * Club domestic league appearances and goals

Joe Sheerin (born 1st February 1979 in Hammersmith, London) is an English former professional footballer who played in the Premier League for Chelsea and in the Football League for AFC Bournemouth.

== Career ==
Sheerin began his career as a trainee with Chelsea, turning professional in August 1996. He made his league debut, as a last minute substitute for Gianfranco Zola in the 1–0 win away to Wimbledon on 22 April 1997. The game ended within a minute of his entering play, and it turned out to be his only appearance for Chelsea, giving him the record for the shortest Premier League career.

He left Chelsea in February 2000, joining AFC Bournemouth, and scored a spectacular hooked goal on his home debut against Oldham Athletic. He left Dean Court by mutual consent in October 2000, joining non-league Kingstonian. In the summer of 2002 Sheerin attended trials for AFC Wimbledon and was made captain of the newly-formed side. He became a firm favourite with the fans as the Dons rose through the non-league pyramid. He left in June 2005, after scoring 35 times in 85 first team appearances, joining Croydon Athletic. He left Croydon in December 2005, briefly returning to AFC Wimbledon, before moving on to Leatherhead in 2006.

He was sent off in the preliminary round of the FA Cup against Dartford on 1 September 2007 for throwing a punch, which missed. Leatherhead went on to lose the game 3–0.
