= Terry Eames =

English footballer and manager

Personal information
- Date of birth: 13 October 1957 (age 69)
- Place of birth: Kennington, England
- Position: Full back

Youth career
- Crystal Palace

Senior career*
Years	Team	Apps	(Gls)
1977–1980	Wimbledon	47	(1)
- Dulwich Hamlet
- Leatherhead
- Kingstonian

Managerial career
- 2002–2004: AFC Wimbledon
- 2004–20xx: Ash United
- 2008–2011: Forest
- 2011–2015: Roffey
- * Club domestic league appearances and goals

Terry Eames (born 13 October 1957) is an English football manager and former professional player.

== Career ==
=== Playing career ===
Eames, who played as a full back, began his career with Crystal Palace, before making his professional debut in 1977 with Wimbledon, making 47 appearances in the Football League over the next three years. He later played non-league football with Dulwich Hamlet, Leatherhead and Kingstonian.

=== Coaching career ===
Eames was appointed as the first manager of AFC Wimbledon in 2002, before being suspended in February 2004 on disciplinary grounds. He was sacked later that month. After leaving that position, Eames became manager of Ash United in May 2004. He began his second spell as manager of Forest in February 2008. Eames was appointed manager of Sussex County Division 3 team Roffey in November 2011. He left the role in December 2015.
