= 2011–12 Luton Town F.C. season =

English football club season

Luton Town
2011–12 season
- Chairman: Nick Owen
- Manager: Gary Brabin (until 31 March 2012); Alan Neilson (caretaker manager from 31 March 2012 to 8 April 2012); Paul Buckle (from 8 April 2012)
- Conference Premier: 5th (play-off finalists)
- FA Cup: Second round
- FA Trophy: Semi-final
- Top goalscorer: League: Stuart Fleetwood (11); All: Stuart Fleetwood (16)
- Highest home attendance: 9,012 vs Wrexham (Conference Premier play-off semi-final, 3 May 2012)
- Lowest home attendance: 1,004 vs Hinckley United (FA Trophy Second round replay, 24 January 2012)
- Average home league attendance: 5,542
Home colours	Away colours	Third colours

The 2011–12 season was the 126th season in the history of Luton Town Football Club. Their third-place finish and subsequent penalty shoot-out loss to AFC Wimbledon in the Conference Premier play-off final in 2010–11 meant they competed in non-League football for the third consecutive year.

Luton finished the season in fifth place – the club's lowest ever finish in the English football league system – though this was enough to secure a play-off place in the last game of the league season. As in 2010–11, Luton defeated Wrexham in the play-off semi-final, only to be beaten in the final, this time in a 2–1 loss to York City at Wembley Stadium.

Manager Gary Brabin was sacked in late March 2012 after a poor run of results saw Luton fall to seventh in the table and lose in the FA Trophy semi-final. He was replaced by former Torquay United and Bristol Rovers manager Paul Buckle.

This article covers the period from 1 July 2011 to 30 June 2012.

== Background ==
After a 30-point deduction and subsequent relegation from The Football League in 2008–09, Luton found themselves in unfamiliar territory in a league outside the top four divisions for the first time in 89 years. Their first campaign in the Conference Premier ended with defeat in the play-offs to York City, despite finishing the season in second place with the highest goals scored tally. The next season saw the club again placed as favourites for promotion, though no team in the division could even come close to overtaking runaway leaders Crawley Town as champions. The failure to win automatic promotion saw manager Richard Money leave the club by mutual consent towards the end of the season, where he was replaced by assistant manager Gary Brabin. The season also saw a large turnaround in playing staff, not least in the departures of the 2009–10 season's top scorers Tom Craddock and Kevin Gallen, sold and loaned respectively to clubs in the league above, and the retirement of club captain Kevin Nicholls. The club's transfer policy, previously focused on signing experienced ex-league players like Mark Tyler, Adam Newton and Alan White, instead shifted to buying younger players who had spent the vast majority of their career in non-league football, such as Andy Drury, Charlie Henry, Alex Lawless, Amari Morgan-Smith, Jason Walker, and Robbie Willmott.

Luton finished in third place in the league, 21 points behind Crawley, meaning they were entered into the play-offs for the second year in a row. The club played Wrexham in the semi-final, winning 5–1 on aggregate in two dominating displays. This set up a final against AFC Wimbledon at the City of Manchester Stadium, from which Luton lost 4–3 in a penalty shoot-out after a goalless and evenly matched 120 minutes.

In the close season, Luton began reshaping their squad for the next year. Adam Newton, Lloyd Owusu, Zdeněk Kroča and Jason Walker all left the club, while Aaron O'Connor and Dean Beckwith were bought in as free transfers on a two-year contract.

== Review ==
=== July ===
On 1 July, winger Claude Gnakpa signed on a free transfer for League One side Walsall after reaching the end of his Luton contract. Gnakpa had scored 15 goals in the previous season. Defenders Ed Asafu-Adjaye and Fred Murray both signed new contracts with the club on 12 July.

A friendly against near-neighbours Hitchin Town on 15 July saw Luton run out as 4–2 winners, with trialist Drewe Broughton scoring two goals. Following this, the club embarked on a pre-season tour of North Wales, beginning with a match against The New Saints on 17 July. Luton were comprehensively beaten 3–0. Luton followed up their loss to TNS with a 2–1 victory over Airbus UK Broughton on 19 July. They ended the tour on a high, with Matthew Barnes-Homer scoring the only goal in a 1–0 win against Colwyn Bay on 21 July. During the tour a number of players were taken on trial, including Broughton, defender Will Antwi, and midfielder Jon Routledge.

On 18 July, the club signed Crawley Town winger James Dance for an undisclosed fee on a two-year contract.

A local friendly at Bedford Town on 23 July ended in a 1–0 victory for the home side. Luton had retained Antwi and Broughton as trialists, in addition to former Rushden & Diamonds defender Curtis Osano and out-of-contract striker Leon McKenzie. Luton's first home friendly was on 27 July against Azerbaijan Premier League side Gabala FC, managed by former England captain Tony Adams. Fielding a team that involved new trialist striker Nathan Elder, Luton lost the game 3–2, with goals coming from Elder and new signing Aaron O'Connor. Young midfielder Adam Watkins drew praise from manager Gary Brabin after the game for his performance against strong opposition.

On 29 July, Luton signed defensive duo Will Antwi and Curtis Osano on six-month contracts after a successful trial period. Osano scored a 25-yard goal in a 4–0 win over Cambridge City on 30 July. Other goals came from Adam Watkins and two from Aaron O'Connor.

=== August ===
On 2 August Luton played against Italian Serie A side Parma, losing 2–0. The club's final pre-season fixture at home was a match on 5 August against Premier League team Queens Park Rangers. Luton conceded a goal within 30 seconds of kick-off, but recovered to record a 3–1 victory over their more illustrious opponents. The last first-team friendly, albeit with a weaker squad than the one that beat QPR, took place the next day, with Luton going down 2–1 to Conference North side Corby Town. Former Southampton and Southend United striker Matt Paterson was on trial with Luton, playing for the majority of the game against Corby. The final game of pre-season involved a Luton XI side playing against Arlesey Town in the Bedfordshire Premier Cup final on 9 August. Luton lost the game 2–1, with Danny Crow scoring. After the game, it was confirmed that trialists Nathan Elder and Matt Paterson would not be offered contracts. Luton made a bid for League Two side Oxford United's striker James Constable on 10 August, though this was rejected by the club.

On 11 August, it was confirmed that Luton's first game of the season against AFC Telford United would be postponed due to stretched police resources in the wake of the 2011 England riots and a planned English Defence League march in Telford that same day.

On 12 August, Luton loaned out young defenders Alex Lacey and JJ O'Donnell to Cambridge City for one month.

Luton's first game of the season against Forest Green Rovers on 16 August ended in a 1–1 draw, with Dean Beckwith scoring a goal on his debut.

The next day, it was announced that Forest Green had turned down a bid from Luton for their top-scorer Reece Styche. Later, it also emerged Gateshead had rejected a £40,000 bid for their own top-scorer Jon Shaw.

Luton recorded a 5–1 victory over Southport on 20 August, with goals coming from Adam Watkins, Will Antwi, Amari Morgan-Smith, Robbie Willmott and Danny Crow. Two days after his impressive performance against Southport, 19-year-old Watkins signed a two-year contract extension.

Before Luton's game away at Mansfield Town on 23 August, it was announced that first-team midfielders Alex Lawless, Keith Keane and Robbie Willmott had all picked up injuries and were ruled out, expanding the injury list to seven first-team players. Luton went a goal down for the third time in as many games, but secured a 1–1 draw when Will Antwi headed in late on.

On 25 August, striker Matthew Barnes-Homer joined League One side Rochdale on loan until January 2012. The next day, Southport attacking midfielder John Paul Kissock joined Luton on a two-year contract for an undisclosed fee. As part of the deal, Luton midfielder Godfrey Poku and striker Dan Walker joined Southport on loan until December 2011. League One side Stevenage made two bids for Luton midfielder Keith Keane on 27 August, though both were rejected. Luton played Braintree Town later that day, winning 3–1 with two goals from Amari Morgan-Smith and one from Jake Howells. Luton played their second away game of the season on 30 August, managing a 2–2 draw against Hayes & Yeading United despite having missed two penalties during the game. Amari Morgan-Smith and Danny Crow scored Luton's goals, which left the club eighth in the table at the end of August with a game in hand over all teams above them.

Transfer deadline day, 31 August, saw Luton reject a bid from Forest Green for winger Robbie Willmott. Later that evening, Luton signed two strikers; Trinidad and Tobago international Collin Samuel as a free agent on a one-year contract, and Hereford United's Stuart Fleetwood on a two-year contract for an undisclosed fee.

=== September ===
Luton played Stockport County on 2 September, conceding a goal in stoppage time to record a 1–1 draw. Alex Lawless had put Luton ahead in the fifth minute with a 25-yard strike, before Stockport hit back late on through a deflected Sean McConville goal. Stuart Fleetwood made his debut as a substitute, hitting the post with the last kick of the game. On 9 September Luton signed Hayes & Yeading United captain Jamie Hand on loan. Hand made his debut in midfield the next day as Luton ran out comfortable 2–0 victors over Darlington. Danny Crow opened the scoring in the first half, before Darlington had Graeme Lee sent off for persistent fouling. Stuart Fleetwood scored the second goal on his home debut. A 2–0 win over AFC Telford United on 13 September propelled Luton to third in the table. Amari Morgan-Smith scored both goals, taking his tally for the season to six. This game also saw Keith Keane make his 250th appearance for the club. Four days later, the club extended its winning run to three games with a 1–0 home victory over Lincoln City, Stuart Fleetwood scoring the winning goal late on. The victory was made more significant as Luton had played 70 minutes of the match with only 10 men after Dean Beckwith was sent off for violent conduct. With Beckwith suspended for the next three games, and defenders George Pilkington, Shane Blackett, Dan Gleeson, Fred Murray, Curtis Osano and Keith Keane all injured, manager Gary Brabin moved to bring in Hungarian centre-back János Kovács on an emergency one-month loan from Hereford United on 19 September. Kovács had previously played for Luton in the latter half of the 2009–10 season. Kovács played the next day away at Bath City. Morgan-Smith scored for Luton late in the first half, but Bath hit back to secure a 1–1 draw, despite ending the match with nine men. Other results meant the draw lifted Luton to the top of the table for the first time in the season.

The next day, Luton sold 16-year-old youth midfielder Michael Cain to Championship side Leicester City. The transfer fee was an undisclosed five figure fee, with add-ons and a sell-on clause included.

Luton underwent back-to-back defeats to York City and Cambridge United on 24 and 27 September respectively, knocking them from first to ninth in the table. During the half-time break of the 3–0 defeat away at York, midfielder Alex Lawless broke his hand after punching a wall out of frustration, resulting in him being ruled out for around a month and being handed a fine.

=== October ===
October began with Luton getting back to winning ways, claiming a 5–1 home victory over Barrow. Despite going a goal down within two minutes, two goals from Robbie Willmott, one from Adam Watkins, a first Luton goal from winger James Dance, and one from top scorer Amari Morgan-Smith secured the win, pushing the club into sixth place in the table. A week later, Luton won their second away game of the season with a 2–1 victory at Kidderminster Harriers, winger Robbie Willmott scoring two goals for the second game in succession. Defenders Shane Blackett and George Pilkington made their first appearances of the season as they returned from long-term injuries. On 11 October, Luton drew 2–2 away to Ebbsfleet United, conceding two late goals after strikes from Morgan-Smith and Dance had initially put them in control. Four days later Luton beat fellow promotion-hopefuls Gateshead 5–1 at Kenilworth Road. Two goals apiece from Jake Howells and Jamie Hand, and one from Aaron O'Connor, pushed the club into third in the table.

Tommy Wright signed as a free agent on a three-month deal on 18 October. The same day, Luton lost 1–0 at home to Wrexham. Luton won their third away game of the season on 21 October, beating Grimsby Town 1–0, with Wright scoring his first goal for the club.

János Kovács re-signed on loan from Hereford United until January 2012, with a view to a permanent move. The initial loan move would go through on 4 November.

Luton played Hendon in the FA Cup Fourth round qualifying on 29 October. Despite conceding an early goal, Luton went on to comfortably win the game 5–1, O'Connor scoring two goals. The game saw Charlie Henry make his Luton debut; despite initially signing for the club 11 months previously, a serious foot injury had prevented Henry from playing until now. Luton were drawn against near-neighbours Northampton Town for the next round of the FA Cup.

Curtis Osano signed a six-month contract extension on 31 October, keeping him at the club until May 2012.

=== November ===
Luton lost their third home game of the season on 5 November, going down 2–1 to league leaders Fleetwood Town, a result that pushed the club down to seventh place in the table.

Defender Alex Lacey joined Conference South side Thurrock on a one-month loan in early November, while Trinidadian striker Collin Samuel left the club on 8 November, after making just one substitute appearance. On 10 November Jamie Hand extended his loan with Luton until 14 December, and the club signed Darlington left-back Greg Taylor on loan, with a permanent transfer due to take place in January. Current left-back Fred Murray, who was expected to take up to 12 months to recover from a serious knee injury, was de-registered as a player (albeit still contracted to the club) in order to make room for Taylor.

Luton beat League Two strugglers Northampton Town 1–0 in the FA Cup first round on 12 November, substitute Adam Watkins scoring a late winner. Luton were drawn at home to Cheltenham Town for the second round.

On 16 November 18-year-old Stoke City striker Ryan Brunt joined Luton on loan until 1 January 2012.

Luton drew 1–1 away at fellow play-off hopefuls Cambridge United on 19 November, with Stuart Fleetwood scoring his first league goal in two months.

With the loan transfer window closing, Luton sent Charlie Henry and Will Antwi out on loan to Aldershot Town and Grimsby Town respectively on 24 November.

Danny Crow scored a stoppage-time winner as Luton beat Newport County 1–0 on 26 November. A 1–1 home draw against AFC Telford United on 29 November left Luton in sixth place in the table.

=== December ===
Luton were knocked out of the FA Cup by League Two side Cheltenham Town on 3 December, losing 4–2 with Aaron O'Connor scoring both goals. In the league, the club conceded another late goal as they drew 1–1 with struggling Lincoln City. Luton ended the game with 9 men as Jamie Hand and Alex Lawless were both sent off.

Goalkeeper Mark Tyler signed a one-year contract extension on 8 December.

Luton progressed to the second round of the FA Trophy two days later with a 2–0 victory over Swindon Supermarine. Two league victories towards the end of December, a 3–1 win over Tamworth and a 5–0 thrashing of Kettering Town, meant Luton ended the month in the play-off positions.

=== January ===
Luton mirrored their 5–0 home win against Kettering Town with another 5–0 victory in the away game on New Year's Day. The same day saw striker Matthew Barnes-Homer leave the club, while defender Will Antwi was released the next day. The club also made permanent the loan signings of defenders János Kovács and Greg Taylor, who both signed 18-month contracts. Fourth and fifth successive league victories in early January followed with a 2–0 home win against Newport County and a 1–0 win against Stockport County. These cemented Luton's third position in the table. After the initial game was postponed due to a frozen pitch, the club's FA Trophy second round tie with Hinckley United was played out on 18 January. The two clubs struggled to a 0–0 draw, meaning a replay would be played on 23 January.

The club released Tommy Wright on 18 January, and moved to bring in striker Craig McAllister on loan from Newport County until the end of the season.

Luton's winning run in the league came to an end as they drew 3–3 away at Southport on 21 January. The FA Trophy replay with Hinckley two days later resulted in a 3–0 win for Luton. The game saw young midfielder Jerry Nash make his first start for the club. Luton drew for the eleventh time in the league on 25 January in a 0–0 stalemate with Mansfield Town. A George Pilkington penalty saw Luton beat Alfreton Town 1–0 on 28 January.

On 31 January, transfer deadline day, Luton signed York City midfielder Andre Boucaud on an 18-month contract for a fee of £25,000.

=== February ===
Luton played Kidderminster Harriers in the FA Trophy third round on 7 February, winning 2–1 and putting the club into the quarter-final draw. The club's game away to Forest Green Rovers on 11 February was postponed due to a frozen pitch. The club won their next league game on 18 February, taking their unbeaten run to 13 games, with a 3–0 home victory over Tamworth.

On 20 February, goalkeeper Kevin Pilkington was appointed goalkeeping coach of Notts County alongside their new manager Keith Curle. Luton released Pilkington from his playing contract to allow him to take up the role.

Luton lost 1–0 to Barrow on 21 February, effectively eliminating any hope of automatic promotion due to league leaders Fleetwood Town extending their own unbeaten run to 18 games and pulling ahead by 14 points. Luton won the FA Trophy quarter-final against Gateshead 2–0 on 25 February, with goals from John Paul Kissock and Keith Keane. The club were drawn to play York City in the two-legged semi-final.

=== March ===
Luton sold youth player Tarum Dawkins to Premier League side Arsenal on 2 March, for what was described as a "significant transfer fee". Dawkins was also being scouted by fourteen other clubs in addition to Arsenal.

The club beat bottom-of-the-table Bath City 2–0 on 3 March, but this would prove the last win throughout eight games in March. League losses to Wrexham, Forest Green Rovers and York City, and draws against struggling Darlington and mid-table Grimsby Town pushed Luton out of the top five and left them with the very real prospect of failing to qualify for the play-offs. In addition, York City defeated Luton 2–1 on aggregate to knock them out of the FA Trophy at the semi-final stage for the second year in a row.

This seven-game winless streak, in which the club scored only four goals – including two from new signing Andre Gray who joined on loan from Hickley United on 22 March – resulted in Gary Brabin losing his job on 31 March, with assistant Alan Neilson put in temporary charge while the club began the search for a new manager. This search was aided by new Technical Director and former Luton player and manager Lil Fuccillo.

=== April ===
Paul Buckle, previously manager at Bristol Rovers and Torquay United, was announced as Luton's new manager on 6 April, although he would officially begin the job on 8 April. Buckle was present in the crowd as Luton turned seven games without a win into eight, this time in a 3–1 loss to Braintree Town, on 7 April. This left the club relying on teams above them to drop points, as well as going on an unbeaten run themselves, if they were to make the play-offs.

The first game of Buckle's tenure on 9 April ended the team's poor run of form, as Luton notched up a comfortable 4–2 win over Hayes & Yeading United. Stuart Fleetwood scored twice, having been placed into his preferred role as a striker, rather than a winger as he often had under Gary Brabin's management. Andre Gray scored his fourth goal in his first four games, setting a Luton Town record in the process. A 0–0 draw with Alfreton Town on 14 April was followed by a 3–0 victory over Ebbsfleet United three days later, Fleetwood scoring twice again, and Craig McAllister scoring his first goal of the season. A vital game against fellow play-off candidates Kidderminster Harriers on 21 April went in Luton's favour, as a second-half Robbie Willmott goal secured a 1–0 win in front of Kenilworth Road's then-biggest crowd of the season. The result left Luton needing two points from their last two games to ensure a play-off place. This task went down to the final game of the league season after Luton could only manage a 0–0 draw with Gateshead in their game-in-hand on 24 April. A win or draw away to free-scoring champions Fleetwood Town would be enough to secure fifth place for the team, while a loss coupled with a Kidderminster win in their own game would see the Harriers take fifth instead. An early own goal and an Andre Gray strike were enough to see Luton win 2–0 at Fleetwood, their fifth clean sheet in a row, meaning they would face second-placed Wrexham in the play-off semi-final.

On 30 April, it was announced that defender Ed Asafu-Adjaye and midfielders Charlie Henry and Christian Tavernier would not be offered new contracts, releasing them from the club.

=== May ===
The first leg of the semi-final with Wrexham on 3 May resulted in a 2–0 win to Luton, strikers Andre Gray and Stuart Fleetwood scoring a goal each in the first half. Four days later, Luton lost the return leg 2–1; their first defeat under manager Paul Buckle's eight games in charge. Captain George Pilkington's penalty in the first half ensured Luton won the tie 3–2 on aggregate to set up a final with York City at Wembley Stadium on 20 May.

Despite Andre Gray scoring after only 71 seconds in the final, the club lost 2–1 to York in a closely contested match with over 30,000 Luton fans in attendance. York's winning goal was scored from an offside position, not seen by the assistant referee, and Luton could not find a way past York's defence to get back into the game.

Andre Gray's loan from Hinckley United became permanent on 21 May, as he joined the club on a two-year contract for a fee of £30,000. Young midfielder JJ O'Donnell also signed a three-year contract extension after impressing Paul Buckle in training. On 28 May, defender Curtis Osano joined League Two side AFC Wimbledon on a free transfer. Defenders Shane Blackett and Dan Gleeson, along with striker Danny Crow, were not offered new contracts and were released from the club on 30 May. All three players had suffered with injuries during the season, with Blackett and Gleeson restricted to only twelve appearances each.

=== June ===
On 7 June, the club announced that Keith Keane, who had made his Luton debut in 2003 and played in 284 games across four different leagues, was to join League One side Preston North End on a free transfer once his contract ended on 1 July. Defender Alex Lacey, who had spent the vast majority of the season out on loan at three different clubs, signed a two-year contract extension on 14 June. The next day, the club released a statement confirming that midfielders Robbie Willmott and Godfrey Poku had rejected new contracts. As Poku was under 24 years of age, the club were entitled to money from a tribunal in the event he moved to another club. Luton made their first incoming transfers of the summer over the next two days, firstly securing former Stevenage captain and right-back Ronnie Henry on a free transfer on 16 June, followed a day later by Gillingham midfielder Danny Spiller, also for free. Captain George Pilkington signed for Mansfield Town on 19 June alongside Godfrey Poku. Both transfers, which were free as both players had reached the end of their contract, would become permanent on 1 July. Later the same day, the club confirmed that striker Amari Morgan-Smith, who despite scoring ten goals had been injured for a large part of the season, would not be offered a new contract. After these three departures, two further players were signed in the form of strikers Scott Rendell and Jon Shaw. Rendell, penning a two-year contract, joined on an undisclosed fee from Wycombe Wanderers, while Shaw also signed a two-year contract following his rejection of an offer from Gateshead, where he had scored 35 goals during the season. The club made their fifth signing on 25 June with the acquisition of Gillingham centre-back Garry Richards, the deal officially going through on 1 July. Jake Howells, now Luton's current longest-serving player following Keith Keane's departure, signed a three-year contract extension on 27 June. Goalkeeper Lewis Kidd signed a one-year contract on 29 June, while it was announced the same day that striker Dan Walker had rejected two contract offers from Luton and so would be placed on the transfer list.

== Match results ==
Luton Town results given first.

=== Legend ===
Win	Draw	Loss

=== Pre-season friendlies ===
Date	Opponent	Venue	Result	Attendance	Scorers	Notes
13 July 2011	Ampthill Town	Away	2–2	Unknown	Philippe-Yamfam, Chisom	Luton XI
15 July 2011	Hitchin Town	Away	4–2	835	Morgan-Smith (pen), Broughton, Barnes-Homer	
17 July 2011	The New Saints	Away	0–3	Unknown	–	
19 July 2011	Airbus UK Broughton	Away	2–1	Unknown	Willmott, Crow	
21 July 2011	Colwyn Bay	Away	1–0	Unknown	Barnes-Homer	
23 July 2011	Bedford Town	Away	0–1	896	–	
27 July 2011	Gabala FC	Home	2–3	1,193	O'Connor, Elder	
30 July 2011	Cambridge City	Away	4–0	294	Watkins, Osano, O'Connor (2)	
2 August 2011	Parma	Home	0–2	3,173	–	
5 August 2011	Queens Park Rangers	Home	3–1	3,710	Barnes-Homer, Morgan-Smith, Watkins	
6 August 2011	Corby Town	Away	1–2	320	Tavernier	
9 August 2011	Arlesey Town	Away	1–2	282	Crow	Luton XI; Bedfordshire Premier Cup Final

=== Conference Premier ===
Pos	Team	Pld	W	D	L	GF	GA	GD	Pts	Promotion, qualification or relegation
3	Mansfield Town	46	25	14	7	87	48	+39	89	Qualification for the Conference Premier play-offs
4	York City (O, P)	46	23	14	9	81	45	+36	83	Qualification for the Conference Premier play-offs
5	Luton Town	46	22	15	9	78	42	+36	81	Qualification for the Conference Premier play-offs
6	Kidderminster Harriers	46	22	10	14	82	63	+19	76	
7	Southport	46	21	13	12	72	69	+3	76	

Source: Football Conference
Rules for classification: 1) points; 2) goal difference; 3) number of goals scored.
(O) Play-off winners; (P) Promoted

==== Results by round ====
Round	1	2	3	4	5	6	7	8	9	10	11	12	13	14	15	16	17	18	19	20	21	22	23	24	25	26	27	28	29	30	31	32	33	34	35	36	37	38	39	40	41	42	43	44	45	46
Ground	H	H	A	H	A	A	H	A	H	A	A	H	H	A	A	H	H	A	H	A	A	H	A	A	H	A	H	H	A	H	H	H	A	H	A	A	A	H	H	A	H	A	H	H	A	H
Result	D	W	D	W	D	D	W	W	W	D	L	L	W	W	D	W	L	W	L	D	W	D	D	W	W	W	W	W	D	D	W	W	L	W	L	D	L	D	L	L	W	D	W	W	D	W
Position	16	10	10	6	8	6	7	3	2	1	6	9	6	6	5	3	5	3	7	7	6	6	7	5	5	3	3	3	3	3	3	3	3	3	3	3	4	5	6	7	7	7	6	5	5	5

Updated to match(es) played on 28 April 2012. Source: lutontown.co.uk
A = Away; H = Home; W = Win; D = Draw; L = Loss

==== Fixtures and results ====
Date	Opponent	Venue	Result	Attendance	Scorers	Notes
16 August 2011	Forest Green Rovers	Home	1–1	6,061	Beckwith	
20 August 2011	Southport	Home	5–1	5,681	Watkins, Antwi, Morgan-Smith, Willmott, Crow	
23 August 2011	Mansfield Town	Away	1–1	2,592	Antwi	
27 August 2011	Braintree Town	Home	3–1	5,703	Morgan-Smith (2), Howells	
30 August 2011	Hayes & Yeading United	Away	2–2	1,015	Morgan-Smith, Crow	
2 September 2011	Stockport County	Away	1–1	3,389	Lawless	
10 September 2011	Darlington	Home	2–0	5,952	Crow, Fleetwood	
13 September 2011	AFC Telford United	Away	2–0	2,640	Morgan-Smith (2)	
17 September 2011	Lincoln City	Home	1–0	6,316	Fleetwood	
20 September 2011	Bath City	Away	1–1	1,158	Morgan-Smith	
24 September 2011	York City	Away	0–3	3,570	–	
27 September 2011	Cambridge United	Home	0–1	6,274	–	
1 October 2011	Barrow	Home	5–1	5,613	Willmott (2), Watkins, Dance, Morgan-Smith	
8 October 2011	Kidderminster Harriers	Away	2–1	3,332	Willmott (2)	
11 October 2011	Ebbsfleet United	Away	2–2	1,651	Morgan-Smith, Dance	
15 October 2011	Gateshead	Home	5–1	6,285	Howells (2), O'Connor, Hand (2)	
18 October 2011	Wrexham	Home	0–1	7,270	–	
21 October 2011	Grimsby Town	Away	1–0	3,239	Wright	
5 November 2011	Fleetwood Town	Home	1–2	6,361	Kovács	
19 November 2011	Cambridge United	Away	1–1	4,796	Fleetwood	
26 November 2011	Newport County	Away	1–0	1,511	Crow	
29 November 2011	AFC Telford United	Home	1–1	5,399	Willmott	
6 December 2011	Lincoln City	Away	1–1	2,049	Crow	
17 December 2011	Tamworth	Away	3–1	1,467	Crow (2), Dance	
26 December 2011	Kettering Town	Home	5–0	7,164	Howells, O'Connor, Lawless, Fleetwood, Willmott	
1 January 2012	Kettering Town	Away	5–0	3,247	Howells, Watkins, Kovács, Taylor, Fleetwood	
7 January 2012	Newport County	Home	2–0	6,108	O'Connor, Crow	
10 January 2012	Stockport County	Home	1–0	5,588	O'Connor (pen)	
21 January 2012	Southport	Away	3–3	1,665	Crow, Watkins, O'Connor	
25 January 2012	Mansfield Town	Home	0–0	5,261	–	
28 January 2012	Alfreton Town	Home	1–0	5,658	G. Pilkington (pen)	
18 February 2012	Tamworth	Home	3–0	5,833	Fleetwood, Kovács, own goal	
21 February 2012	Barrow	Away	0–1	925	–	
3 March 2012	Bath City	Home	2–0	5,745	Kovács, Watkins	
7 March 2012	Wrexham	Away	0–2	4,206	–	
13 March 2012	Darlington	Away	1–1	1,382	Fleetwood	
20 March 2012	Forest Green Rovers	Away	0–3	975	–	
24 March 2012	Grimsby Town	Home	1–1	6,419	Gray	
30 March 2012	York City	Home	1–2	5,925	Gray	
7 April 2012	Braintree Town	Away	1–3	1,703	Gray	
9 April 2012	Hayes & Yeading United	Home	4–2	6,003	Fleetwood (2), Keane, Gray	
14 April 2012	Alfreton Town	Away	0–0	1,654	–	
17 April 2012	Ebbsfleet United	Home	3–0	5,526	Fleetwood (2), McAllister	
21 April 2012	Kidderminster Harriers	Home	1–0	8,415	Willmott	
24 April 2012	Gateshead Town	Away	0–0	703	–	
28 April 2012	Fleetwood Town	Away	2–0	4,446	own goal, Gray	

=== Conference Premier play-offs ===
Round	Date	Opponent	Venue	Result	Attendance	Scorers	Notes
Semi-final first leg	3 May 2012	Wrexham	Home	2–0	9,012	Gray, Fleetwood	
Semi-final second leg	7 May 2012	Wrexham	Away	1–2	9,087	Pilkington (pen)	Luton win 3–2 on aggregate
Final	20 May 2012	York City	Neutral	1–2	39,265	Gray	

=== FA Cup ===
Round	Date	Opponent	Venue	Result	Attendance	Scorers	Notes
Fourth qualifying round	29 October 2011	Hendon	Home	5–1	2,329	O'Connor (2), Dance, Wright, Fleetwood	
First round	12 November 2011	Northampton Town	Home	1–0	4,799	Watkins	
Second round	3 December 2011	Cheltenham Town	Home	2–4	4,516	O'Connor (2)	

=== FA Trophy ===
Round	Date	Opponent	Venue	Result	Attendance	Scorers	Notes
First round	10 December 2011	Swindon Supermarine	Home	2–0	1,298	Fleetwood, Wright	
Second round	18 January 2012	Hinckley United	Away	0–0	754	–	
Second round replay	23 January 2012	Hinckley United	Home	3–0	1,004	own goal, Morgan-Smith, Fleetwood	
Third round	7 February 2012	Kidderminster Harriers	Away	2–1	1,186	Howells, Fleetwood	
Quarter-final	25 February 2012	Gateshead	Home	2–0	2,499	Kissock, Keane	
Semi-final first leg	10 March 2012	York City	Away	0–1	3,365	–	
Semi-final second leg	17 March 2012	York City	Home	1–1	5,796	Willmott	

== Player statistics ==
Correct as of 22 May 2012. Players with a zero in every column appeared as unused substitutes or were assigned squad numbers.

No.	Pos.	Name	League		FA Cup		FA Trophy		Total		Discipline	
No.	Pos.	Name	Apps	Goals	Apps	Goals	Apps	Goals	Apps	Goals	Yellow card	Red card
1	GK	(England) Mark Tyler	37	0	0	0	7	0	44	0	1	0
2	DF	(England) Dan Gleeson	8 (2)	0	1	0	1	0	10 (2)	0	2	0
3	DF	(Republic of Ireland) Fred Murray	0	0	0	0	0	0	0	0	0	0
3	DF	(England) Greg Taylor	15 (3)	1	0	0	5	0	20 (3)	1	2	0
4	MF	(Republic of Ireland) Keith Keane	36	1	2	0	4	1	42	2	8	1
5	DF	(England) Dean Beckwith	8	1	1	0	2	0	11	1	2	1
6	DF	(England) George Pilkington	36	2	2	0	3	0	41	2	2	0
7	MF	(Wales) Alex Lawless	41	2	2	0	4	0	47	2	11	1
8	FW	(England) Amari Morgan-Smith	15 (4)	9	1	0	1	1	17 (4)	10	7	0
9	FW	(England) Matthew Barnes-Homer	1	0	0	0	0	0	1	0	0	0
9	FW	(Scotland) Craig McAllister	4 (13)	1	0	0	0	0	4 (13)	1	0	0
10	FW	(England) Danny Crow	23 (6)	9	1 (2)	0	3	0	27 (7)	9	3	0
11	MF	(England) Robbie Willmott	32 (10)	8	1 (1)	0	5	1	38 (11)	9	4	0
12	DF	(England) Shane Blackett	5 (4)	0	0	0	2 (1)	0	7 (5)	0	0	0
13	FW	(Wales) Stuart Fleetwood	25 (15)	12	1	1	5 (1)	3	31 (16)	16	4	0
14	FW	(England) Aaron O'Connor	21 (14)	5	3	4	0 (1)	0	24 (14)	9	2	0
15	MF	(Wales) Jake Howells	45	5	3	0	4	1	52	6	2	1
16	DF	(England) Ed Asafu-Adjaye	7 (2)	0	0	0	4	0	11 (2)	0	2	1
17	DF	(Ghana) Will Antwi	12	2	1	0	0	0	13	2	0	0
17	MF	(Trinidad and Tobago) Andre Boucaud	4 (3)	0	0	0	0	0	4 (3)	0	1	0
18	DF	(Kenya) Curtis Osano	31	0	2	0	5 (1)	0	38 (1)	0	4	0
19	MF	(England) James Dance	21 (5)	3	1	1	1	0	23 (5)	4	3	0
20	MF	(England) John Paul Kissock	7 (16)	0	2 (1)	0	5	1	14 (17)	1	0	1
21	MF	(England) Charlie Henry	0 (2)	0	0 (1)	0	2 (1)	0	2 (4)	0	1	0
22	MF	(England) Paul Carden	1	0	0	0	0	0	1	0	0	0
23	FW	(England) Ryan Brunt	0 (5)	0	0	0	1	0	1 (5)	0	0	0
23	FW	(Trinidad and Tobago) Collin Samuel	0 (1)	0	0	0	0	0	0 (1)	0	0	0
24	DF	(England) Alex Lacey	0	0	0	0	3	0	3	0	0	0
25	MF	(England) Godfrey Poku	5 (5)	0	0	0	0	0	5 (5)	0	3	0
26	MF	(England) JJ O'Donnell	0	0	0	0	2 (2)	0	2 (2)	0	0	0
27	FW	(England) Andre Gray	12	7	0	0	0	0	12	7	3	0
27	MF	(England) Jamie Hand	11 (2)	2	2	0	0	0	13 (2)	2	5	1
28	MF	(England) Adam Watkins	23 (14)	5	1 (1)	1	2 (2)	0	26 (17)	6	6	0
29	FW	(England) Dan Walker	0 (1)	0	0	0	0	0	0 (1)	0	0	0
30	GK	(England) Kevin Pilkington	12	0	3	0	0	0	15	0	0	0
31	GK	(England) Lewis Kidd	0	0	0	0	0	0	0	0	0	0
32	DF	(England) Ash Deeney	0	0	0	0	0	0	0	0	0	0
33	FW	(England) Ryan Dasilva	0	0	0	0	0	0	0	0	0	0
34	DF	(Hungary) János Kovács	40	4	2	0	2	0	44	4	6	1
36	MF	(England) Christian Tavernier	0	0	0 (1)	0	0	0	0 (1)	0	0	0
37	FW	(England) Alasan Ann	0	0	0	0	1	0	1	0	0	0
39	FW	(England) Tommy Wright	1 (3)	1	1	1	0 (1)	1	2 (4)	3	0	0
40	MF	(England) Colby McAdams	0	0	0	0	2 (1)	0	2 (1)	0	0	0
41	MF	(England) Charlie Smith	0	0	0	0	0 (1)	0	0 (1)	0	0	0
42	DF	(England) Brett Longden	0	0	0	0	0 (1)	0	0 (1)	0	0	0
43	MF	(England) Jerry Nash	0	0	0	0	1 (1)	0	1 (1)	0	0	0
44	FW	(England) Jake Woolley	0 (1)	0	0	0	0 (4)	0	0 (5)	0	0	0
45	FW	(Zimbabwe) Leeroy Maguraushe	0	0	0	0	0	0	0	0	0	0

- *The league column also includes play-off matches.

== Managerial statistics ==
Only competitive games from the 2011–12 season are included.
Correct as of 22 May 2012.

Name	Nat.	From	To	Record								Honours
Name	Nat.	From	To	PLD	W	D	L	GF	GA	GD	W%	Honours
Gary Brabin	(England)	28 March 2011	31 March 2012	49	24	15	10	85	45	+40	49.0	–
Alan Neilson (caretaker manager)	(Wales)	31 March 2012	8 April 2012	1	0	0	1	1	3	−2	0.0	–
Paul Buckle	(England)	8 April 2012	Present	9	5	2	2	14	6	+8	55.6	Play-off finalists
Total				59	29	17	13	100	54	+46	49.2	Play-off finalists

== Awards ==
Awarded on 22 April 2012.

Award	Name	No.	Pos.	Notes
Luton Town Supporters Club Player of the Year	(Hungary) János Kovács	34	DF	
Players' Player of the Year	(England) Mark Tyler	1	GK	
Young Player of the Year	(England) Adam Watkins	28	MF	
Luton Town F.C. Website Player of the Year	(Hungary) János Kovács	34	DF	
LTSC Junior Members' Player of the Year	(England) Robbie Willmott	11	MF	
Youth Development Player of the Year	(England) Jake Woolley	44	FW	
Ian Pearce Memorial Trophy	(Republic of Ireland) Keith Keane	4	MF	^{[C]}
Goal of the Season	(Republic of Ireland) Keith Keane	4	MF	^{[D]}

== Transfers ==
=== In ===
Date	Player	From	Fee	Notes
18 July 2011	(England) James Dance	Crawley Town	Undisclosed	
29 July 2011	(Ghana) Will Antwi	Unattached		
29 July 2011	(Kenya) Curtis Osano	Unattached		
26 August 2011	(England) John Paul Kissock	Southport	Undisclosed	
27 August 2011	(England) Paul Carden	Unattached		
31 August 2011	(Wales) Stuart Fleetwood	Hereford United	Undisclosed	
31 August 2011	(Trinidad and Tobago) Collin Samuel	Unattached		
18 October 2011	(England) Tommy Wright	Unattached		
2 January 2012	(Hungary) János Kovács	Hereford United	Free	
3 January 2012	(England) Greg Taylor	Darlington	Free	
31 January 2012	(Trinidad and Tobago) Andre Boucaud	York City	£25,000	
21 May 2012	(England) Andre Gray	Hinckley United	£30,000	
16 June 2012	(England) Ronnie Henry	Stevenage	Free	
17 June 2012	(England) Danny Spiller	Gillingham	Free	
20 June 2012	(England) Scott Rendell	Wycombe Wanderers	Undisclosed	
21 June 2012	(England) Jon Shaw	Gateshead	Free	

=== Out ===
Date	Player	To	Fee	Notes
1 July 2011	(France) Claude Gnakpa	Walsall	Free	
20 September 2011	(England) Michael Cain	Leicester City	Undisclosed^{[A]}	
8 November 2011	(Trinidad and Tobago) Collin Samuel	Released		
30 November 2011	(England) Ryan Dasilva	Released		
30 November 2011	(England) Ashley Deeney	Released		
1 January 2012	(England) Matthew Barnes-Homer	Released		
2 January 2012	(Ghana) Will Antwi	Released		
18 January 2012	(England) Tommy Wright	Released		
20 February 2012	(England) Kevin Pilkington	Released		
2 March 2012	(England) Tarum Dawkins	Arsenal	Undisclosed	
30 April 2012	(England) Ed Asafu-Adjaye	Released		
30 April 2012	(England) Charlie Henry	Released		
30 April 2012	(England) Christian Tavernier	Released		
28 May 2012	(Kenya) Curtis Osano	AFC Wimbledon	Free	
30 May 2012	(England) Shane Blackett	Released		
30 May 2012	(England) Danny Crow	Released		
30 May 2012	(England) Dan Gleeson	Released		
19 June 2012	(England) Amari Morgan-Smith	Released		

=== Loans in ===
Date	Player	From	End date	Notes
9 September 2011	(England) Jamie Hand	Hayes & Yeading United	14 December 2011	
19 September 2011	(Hungary) János Kovács	Hereford United	22 October 2011	
4 November 2011	(Hungary) János Kovács	Hereford United	2 January 2012	
10 November 2011	(England) Greg Taylor	Darlington	3 January 2012	
16 November 2011	(England) Ryan Brunt	Stoke City	1 January 2012	^{[B]}
18 January 2012	(Scotland) Craig McAllister	Newport County	21 May 2012	
22 March 2012	(England) Andre Gray	Hinckley United	21 May 2012	

=== Loans out ===
Date	Player	To	End date	Notes
12 August 2011	(England) Alex Lacey	Cambridge City	12 October 2011	
12 August 2011	(England) JJ O'Donnell	Cambridge City	12 October 2011	
25 August 2011	(England) Matthew Barnes-Homer	Rochdale	1 January 2012	
26 August 2011	(England) Godfrey Poku	Southport	7 January 2012	
26 August 2011	(England) Dan Walker	Southport	7 January 2012	
30 September 2011	(England) Ashley Deeney	St Neots Town	30 November 2011	
14 October 2011	(England) JJ O'Donnell	Hampton & Richmond Borough	15 November 2011	
4 November 2011	(England) Alex Lacey	Thurrock	4 December 2011	
24 November 2011	(Ghana) Will Antwi	Grimsby Town	2 January 2012	
24 November 2011	(England) Charlie Henry	Aldershot Town	22 January 2012	
14 December 2011	(England) JJ O'Donnell	Hampton & Richmond Borough	11 January 2012	
21 December 2011	(England) Lewis Kidd	Swindon Supermarine	17 January 2012	
18 February 2012	(England) Alex Lacey	Eastbourne Borough	19 April 2012	
16 March 2012	(England) JJ O'Donnell	Thurrock	19 April 2012	

== Footnotes ==
A. Although officially undisclosed, Luton Town have confirmed that the transfer of Cain to Leicester City was for a "significant five-figure fee" with add-ons depending on his and Leicester's performance.
B. Ryan Brunt was signed from Stoke City on work experience terms; essentially a loan in all but name.
C. The Ian Pearce Memorial Trophy, named in honour of BBC Three Counties Radio presenter and Luton Town fan Ian Pearce who died in March 2011, is presented to the player with the most man-of-the-match awards over the season.
D. The Goal of the Season award was given to Keith Keane for his 30-yard free-kick against Gateshead in the FA Trophy on 25 February 2012.

== See also ==
- 2011–12 in English football
- 2011–12 Football Conference
