= Loch Arthur logboat =

Coordinates: 55°0′11.02″N 3°42′47.03″W

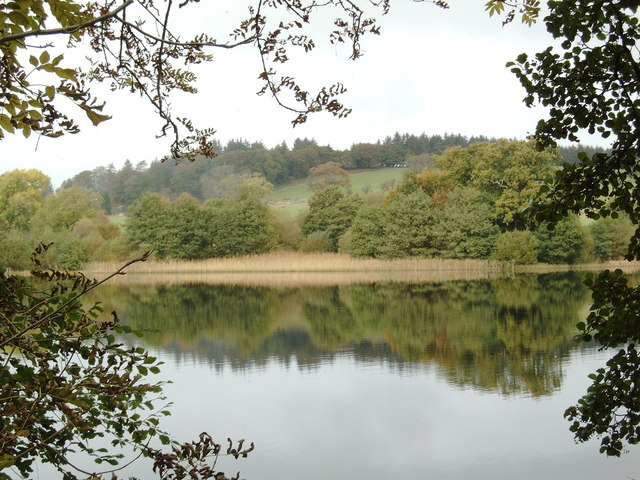
View across Loch Arthur

The Loch Arthur logboat or dugout canoe (also called Loch Arthur 1, Loch Lotus or Lotus Loch) was found in 1874 when the water level was low on the south bank of the Loch Arthur, near the village of Beeswing, southwest of Dumfries in Dumfries and Galloway in Scotland. The logboat, built of oak, is about 13.7 meters long and up to 1.5 meters wide. On the opposite side of the 300 to 400 meter wide lake was a crannóg (lake dwelling).

The Loch Arthur logboat or dugout canoe (also called Loch Arthur 1, Loch Lotus or Lotus Loch) was found in 1874 when the water level was low on the south bank of the Loch Arthur, near Kissock, southwest of Dumfries in Dumfries and Galloway in Scotland. The dugout, built of oak, is about 13.7 meters long and up to 1.5 meters wide. On the opposite side of the 300 to 400 meter wide lake was a crannóg (lake dwelling).

The logboat was damaged during recovery. The bow, including an ornamental animal head, was given to the Museum of Scotland. The surviving part of the sawed-up boat is 6.34 m long. The tail section and a paddle went to the Dumfries Museum and were lost there. The paddle was about 50mm in diameter and the end was decorated. The dugout canoe was built between 100 BC and AD 80.

The rear end formed from a bar was placed in a groove about 38 mm wide. At the end of the starboard side there were seven holes about 76 mm in diameter spaced about 1.5 m apart. The bottom of the boat was pierced with three irregular holes.

The starboard side survives to a height of 0.43 m. The remains did not suffer much from the split, but show strong faults. The bow of the boat has an unusual shape that ended in an extension that resembled the elongated neck and head of an animal. The hole that formed the “eye” was about 127 mm in diameter and was probably used for a line or rope. This feature has also been observed in the dugout canoes "Errol 2" and "Loch of Kinnordy". The pointed bow is notable for its internal gradation, which was probably left as reinforcement. This has no Scottish parallels, but is also found on three boats from Holme Pierrepont, in Nottingham, England to be found, one of which was dated between 230 BC and 110 BC.

Three bronze grapes had previously been found in the lake.
