= McKessock =

McKessock is a surname. Notable people with the surname include:

- Bob McKessock (born 1933), Canadian politician

== See also ==
- McKissock
