= Loch Arthur =

Lake in the United Kingdom

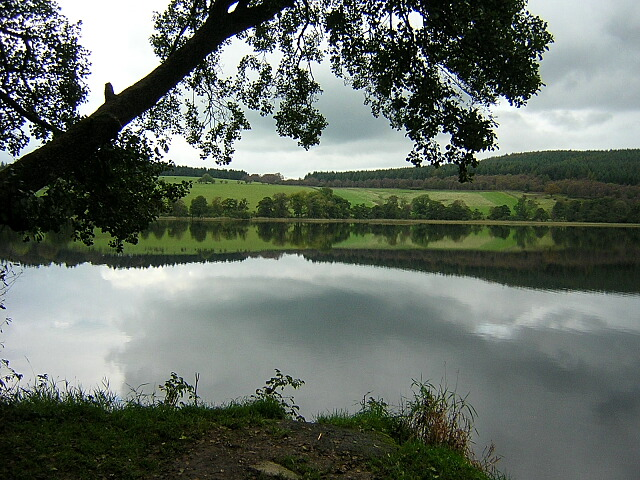
- Loch Arthur

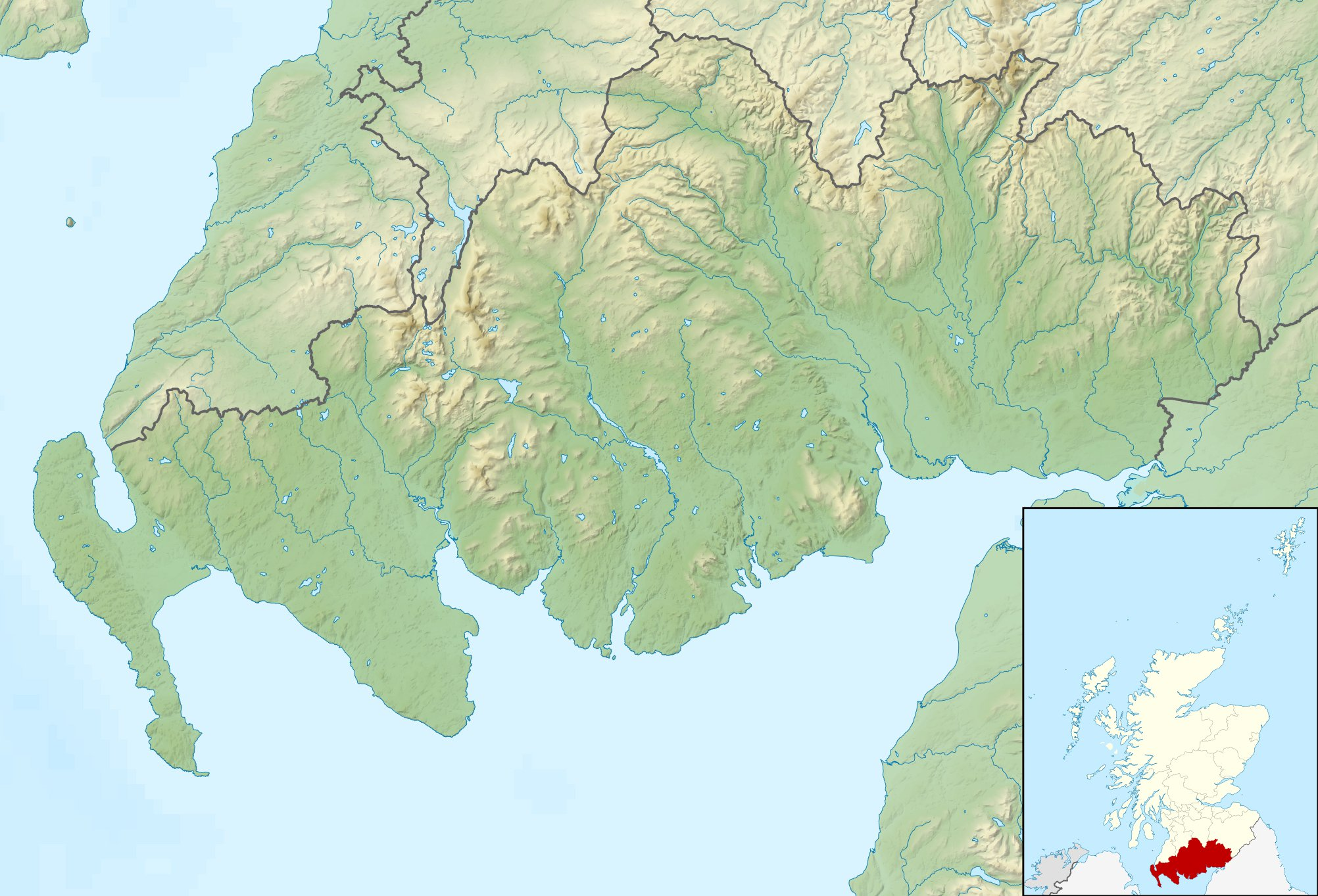
- Location within Dumfries and Galloway
- Location: Dumfries and Galloway, Scotland
- Coordinates: 55.00249863°N 3.71441153°W
- Surface area: 29 hectares (72 acres)
- Max. depth: 15.2 metres (50 ft)
- Water volume: 2,255,968 cubic metres (79,668,800 cu ft)
- Shore length^{1}: 3 kilometres (1.9 mi)
- Surface elevation: 78 metres (256 ft)
- References: https://getoutside.ordnancesurvey.co.uk/local/loch-arthur-dumfries-and-galloway
- ^{1} Shore length is not a well-defined measure.

Loch Arthur (also known as Loch Lotus) is a lake in the council area of Dumfries and Galloway in Scotland near the village of Beeswing.

Loch Arthur lies to the east of the village of Beeswing and has been claimed as the setting for the Arthurian story of the Lady of the Lake.

The loch contains just one prehistoric lake dwelling (crannog), located on the northern shore. Small-scale underwater excavations were carried out in 2004 demonstrating the main timber mound of the crannog dates to the second half of the first millennium BC and was then re-occupied in the later medieval period. A large logboat with an animals-head prow and a possible paddle have been found on the opposite shore.

Loch Arthur Camphill Community is a farm near the loch where people with disabilities, volunteers and staff produce organic cheese, butter and other foods.
