= 2011–12 Football Conference =

Football Conference
- Season: 2011-12

The 2011–12 Football Conference season was the eighth season in which the Football Conference consisted of three divisions and the thirty-third season overall. The Conference covers the top two levels of Non-League football in England. The Conference Premier is the fifth highest level of the overall pyramid, whilst the Conference North and Conference South exist at the sixth level. The Conference was won by Fleetwood Town who together with York City, the winner of the play-off of the Premier division, were promoted to Football League Two, while the bottom four were relegated to the North or South divisions. The champions of the North and South divisions were promoted to the Premier division, alongside the play-off winners from each division. The bottom three in each of the North and South divisions were relegated to the premier divisions of the Northern Premier League, Isthmian League or Southern League.

For sponsorship reasons, the Conference Premier is referred to as the Blue Square Bet Premier.

== Conference Premier ==
Conference Premier
- Season: 2011–12
- Champions: Fleetwood Town
- Promoted: Fleetwood Town; York City
- Relegated: Bath City; Darlington; Hayes & Yeading United; Kettering Town
- Matches: 552
- Goals: 1,574 (2.85 per match)
- Top goalscorer: (England) Jamie Vardy (31)
- Biggest home win: Grimsby Town 7–0 Stockport County (29 November 2011); York City 7–0 Kettering Town (3 December 2011); Mansfield Town 7–0 Barrow (17 March 2012)
- Biggest away win: Southport 0–6 Fleetwood Town (1 January 2012)
- Highest scoring: Kidderminster Harriers 5–4 Braintree Town (18 October 2011); Alfreton Town 3–6 Mansfield Town (20 March 2012)
- Highest attendance: 8,415; Luton Town 1–0 Kidderminster Harriers (21 April 2012)
- Lowest attendance: 172; Hayes & Yeading United 1–1 Bath City (23 August 2011)

A total of 24 teams contested the division, including 18 sides from the previous season, two relegated from the Football League Two, two promoted from the Conference North and two promoted from the Conference South.

=== Promotion and relegation ===
Teams promoted from 2010–11 Conference North

- Alfreton Town
- AFC Telford United

Teams promoted from 2010–11 Conference South

- Braintree Town
- Ebbsfleet United

Teams relegated from 2010–11 League Two

- Stockport County
- Lincoln City

=== League table ===
| Pos | Team | Pld | W | D | L | GF | GA | GD | Pts | Promotion, qualification or relegation |
|---|---|---|---|---|---|---|---|---|---|---|
| 1 | Fleetwood Town (C, P) | 46 | 31 | 10 | 5 | 102 | 48 | +54 | 103 | Promotion to Football League Two |
| 2 | Wrexham | 46 | 30 | 8 | 8 | 85 | 33 | +52 | 98 | Qualification for the Conference Premier play-offs |
| 3 | Mansfield Town | 46 | 25 | 14 | 7 | 87 | 48 | +39 | 89 | Qualification for the Conference Premier play-offs |
| 4 | York City (O, P) | 46 | 23 | 14 | 9 | 81 | 45 | +36 | 83 | Qualification for the Conference Premier play-offs |
| 5 | Luton Town | 46 | 22 | 15 | 9 | 78 | 42 | +36 | 81 | Qualification for the Conference Premier play-offs |
| 6 | Kidderminster Harriers | 46 | 22 | 10 | 14 | 82 | 63 | +19 | 76 | |
| 7 | Southport | 46 | 21 | 13 | 12 | 72 | 69 | +3 | 76 | |
| 8 | Gateshead | 46 | 21 | 11 | 14 | 69 | 62 | +7 | 74 | |
| 9 | Cambridge United | 46 | 19 | 14 | 13 | 57 | 41 | +16 | 71 | |
| 10 | Forest Green Rovers | 46 | 19 | 13 | 14 | 66 | 45 | +21 | 70 | |
| 11 | Grimsby Town | 46 | 19 | 13 | 14 | 79 | 60 | +19 | 70 | |
| 12 | Braintree Town | 46 | 17 | 11 | 18 | 76 | 80 | −4 | 62 | |
| 13 | Barrow | 46 | 17 | 9 | 20 | 62 | 76 | −14 | 60 | |
| 14 | Ebbsfleet United | 46 | 14 | 12 | 20 | 69 | 84 | −15 | 54 | |
| 15 | Alfreton Town | 46 | 15 | 9 | 22 | 62 | 86 | −24 | 54 | |
| 16 | Stockport County | 46 | 12 | 15 | 19 | 58 | 74 | −16 | 51 | |
| 17 | Lincoln City | 46 | 13 | 10 | 23 | 56 | 66 | −10 | 49 | |
| 18 | Tamworth | 46 | 11 | 15 | 20 | 47 | 70 | −23 | 48 | |
| 19 | Newport County | 46 | 11 | 14 | 21 | 53 | 65 | −12 | 47 | |
| 20 | AFC Telford United | 46 | 10 | 16 | 20 | 45 | 65 | −20 | 46 | |
| 21 | Hayes & Yeading United (R) | 46 | 11 | 8 | 27 | 58 | 90 | −32 | 41 | Relegation to Conference South |
| 22 | Darlington | 46 | 11 | 13 | 22 | 47 | 73 | −26 | 36 (Note: Darlington were deducted ten points for entering administration. At the end of the season the club folded, and reformed as Darlington 1883 in the 2012–13 Northern League Division One.) | Club folded |
| 23 | Bath City (R) | 46 | 7 | 10 | 29 | 43 | 89 | −46 | 31 | Relegation to Conference South |
| 24 | Kettering Town (R) | 46 | 8 | 9 | 29 | 40 | 100 | −60 | 30 (Note: Kettering Town were deducted three points for failing to pay football creditors. At the end of the season they resigned from the Football Conference, dropping down two divisions.) | Relegation to the Southern League Premier Division |

Source: Football Conference
Rules for classification: 1) points; 2) goal difference; 3) number of goals scored.
(C) Champions; (O) Play-off winners; (P) Promoted; (R) Relegated

=== Play-offs ===
Semifinals
2 | Wrexham | 0 | 2 | 2
5 | Luton Town | 2 | 1 | 3
3 | Mansfield Town | 1 | 0 | 1
4 | York City (a.e.t.) | 1 | 1 | 2

Final
5 | Luton Town | 1
4 | York City | 2

==== Semi-finals – 1st leg ====
| 2 May 2012 | York City | 1–1 | Mansfield Town | Bootham Crescent, York |
| 19:30 | Geohaghon 42' (o.g.) | Report | Dyer 26'; Green (red card) 74' | Attendance: 6,057; Referee: Richard Clark |

| 3 May 2012 | Luton Town | 2–0 | Wrexham | Kenilworth Road, Luton |
| 19:30 | Gray 22'; Fleetwood 30' | Report | | Attendance: 9,012; Referee: Darren Bond |

==== Semi-finals – 2nd leg ====
| 7 May 2012 | Mansfield Town | 0 – 1 (a.e.t.) | York City | Field Mill, Mansfield |
| 14:00 | Sutton (red card) 112' | Report | Blair 111' | Attendance: 7,295; Referee: Andy Davies |

| 7 May 2012 | Wrexham | 2–1 | Luton Town | Racecourse Ground, Wrexham |
| 16:30 | Cieslewicz 63'; Morrell 77' | Report | Pilkington 25' (pen.) | Attendance: 9,087; Referee: Steve Bratt |

==== Final ====
| 20 May 2012 | Luton Town | 1–2 | York City | Wembley Stadium, London |
| 15:00 | Gray 2' | | Chambers 26'; Blair 47' | Attendance: 39,265; Referee: Jeremy Simpson |

=== Stadia and locations ===
Locations of the Conference Premier 2011–12 teams

| Team | Stadium | Capacity |
|---|---|---|
| Stockport County | Edgeley Park | 10,852 |
| Wrexham | Racecourse Ground | 10,500* |
| Luton Town | Kenilworth Road | 10,226 |
| Lincoln City | Sincil Bank | 10,120 |
| Darlington | The Darlington Arena | 10,000* |
| Gateshead | Gateshead International Stadium | 10,000* |
| Mansfield Town | Field Mill | 10,000 |
| Cambridge United | Abbey Stadium | 9,617 |
| Grimsby Town | Blundell Park | 9,546 |
| Bath City | Twerton Park | 8,800 |
| York City | Bootham Crescent | 7,872 |
| Kettering Town | Nene Park | 6,441 |
| AFC Telford United | New Bucks Head | 6,300 |
| Kidderminster Harriers | Aggborough | 6,238 |
| Hayes & Yeading United | Kingfield Stadium (Woking ground share) | 6,036 |
| Southport | Haig Avenue | 6,008 |
| Fleetwood Town | Highbury Stadium | 5,500 |
| Forest Green Rovers | The New Lawn | 5,147 |
| Newport County | Newport Stadium | 5,058 |
| Ebbsfleet United | Stonebridge Road | 5,011 |
| Barrow | Holker Street | 4,256 |
| Braintree Town | Cressing Road | 4,145 |
| Tamworth | The Lamb Ground | 4,000 |
| Alfreton Town | North Street | 3,600 |

* Restricted due to stadium expansion or FA ruling.

=== Results ===
| Home \ Away | TEL | ALF | BRW | BAT | BRA | CAM | DAR | EBB | FLE | FGR | GAT | GRI | H&Y | KET | KID | LIN | LUT | MAN | NPC | SOU | STP | TAM | WRE | YOR |
|---|---|---|---|---|---|---|---|---|---|---|---|---|---|---|---|---|---|---|---|---|---|---|---|---|
| AFC Telford United | | 1–0 | 1–0 | 2–1 | 1–0 | 1–2 | 3–3 | 0–2 | 1–4 | 2–0 | 1–2 | 0–0 | 1–1 | 3–1 | 2–1 | 1–2 | 0–2 | 0–0 | 2–1 | 0–1 | 1–1 | 1–0 | 0–2 | 0–0 |
| Alfreton Town | 0–0 | | 2–1 | 2–1 | 0–1 | 2–1 | 3–1 | 2–2 | 1–4 | 1–6 | 1–1 | 2–5 | 3–2 | 1–1 | 0–2 | 1–3 | 0–0 | 3–6 | 3–2 | 0–0 | 6–1 | 5–2 | 1–4 | 0–2 |
| Barrow | 2–1 | 1–0 | | 0–1 | 0–4 | 1–3 | 3–0 | 1–1 | 4–0 | 1–1 | 1–2 | 2–2 | 3–1 | 3–0 | 3–1 | 1–0 | 1–0 | 2–3 | 3–1 | 2–2 | 1–0 | 1–1 | 3–1 | 0–0 |
| Bath City | 3–1 | 0–3 | 0–1 | | 1–1 | 3–4 | 2–0 | 2–3 | 1–4 | 0–2 | 4–2 | 2–2 | 0–1 | 0–1 | 1–2 | 2–1 | 1–1 | 1–1 | 3–2 | 1–2 | 0–2 | 0–2 | 0–2 | 0–1 |
| Braintree Town | 2–1 | 1–2 | 1–0 | 3–3 | | 3–2 | 3–1 | 2–3 | 1–2 | 1–5 | 3–1 | 5–0 | 0–3 | 2–1 | 1–4 | 1–0 | 3–1 | 1–1 | 1–0 | 0–0 | 2–2 | 3–1 | 0–0 | 0–1 |
| Cambridge United | 1–0 | 3–0 | 1–0 | 1–1 | 2–0 | | 2–0 | 2–0 | 2–0 | 1–1 | 0–1 | 0–1 | 2–1 | 2–0 | 1–2 | 2–0 | 1–1 | 1–2 | 1–1 | 3–0 | 2–2 | 0–1 | 1–1 | 0–1 |
| Darlington | 1–0 | 1–1 | 0–1 | 2–2 | 1–0 | 2–0 | | 0–2 | 0–1 | 0–0 | 0–1 | 0–0 | 1–1 | 3–1 | 1–0 | 3–1 | 1–1 | 0–2 | 2–0 | 0–3 | 0–1 | 2–0 | 2–4 | 2–2 |
| Ebbsfleet United | 3–2 | 1–2 | 1–2 | 3–0 | 1–1 | 0–0 | 1–3 | | 1–3 | 1–1 | 0–1 | 3–1 | 3–1 | 1–0 | 3–3 | 2–3 | 2–2 | 0–3 | 1–1 | 1–2 | 2–1 | 3–0 | 0–5 | 1–2 |
| Fleetwood Town | 2–2 | 4–0 | 4–1 | 4–1 | 3–1 | 1–0 | 0–0 | 6–2 | | 0–0 | 3–1 | 2–1 | 1–0 | 3–0 | 5–2 | 2–2 | 0–2 | 2–0 | 1–4 | 2–2 | 2–1 | 2–2 | 1–1 | 0–0 |
| Forest Green Rovers | 2–1 | 4–1 | 3–0 | 3–0 | 0–2 | 2–1 | 2–0 | 3–1 | 1–2 | | 2–1 | 0–1 | 1–3 | 0–1 | 1–1 | 0–2 | 3–0 | 1–1 | 1–1 | 2–3 | 1–1 | 3–1 | 1–0 | 1–1 |
| Gateshead | 3–0 | 2–0 | 2–0 | 1–0 | 2–2 | 1–1 | 1–1 | 2–3 | 1–1 | 1–0 | | 1–0 | 2–0 | 1–1 | 2–1 | 3–3 | 0–0 | 3–0 | 2–3 | 2–3 | 2–0 | 1–1 | 1–4 | 3–2 |
| Grimsby Town | 2–0 | 5–2 | 5–2 | 6–0 | 1–1 | 2–1 | 1–2 | 4–3 | 0–2 | 2–1 | 2–0 | | 3–0 | 2–1 | 1–2 | 3–1 | 0–1 | 0–0 | 2–2 | 0–1 | 7–0 | 0–0 | 1–3 | 2–3 |
| Hayes & Yeading United | 0–0 | 3–1 | 1–1 | 1–1 | 1–2 | 0–0 | 3–2 | 1–2 | 1–3 | 2–0 | 2–3 | 1–2 | | 1–0 | 1–3 | 1–2 | 2–2 | 1–3 | 0–4 | 0–2 | 1–2 | 1–0 | 0–2 | 2–4 |
| Kettering Town | 2–1 | 0–2 | 1–1 | 1–1 | 2–1 | 0–0 | 0–0 | 2–2 | 2–3 | 1–3 | 2–1 | 1–2 | 3–5 | | 0–1 | 1–0 | 0–5 | 0–3 | 3–2 | 2–3 | 1–3 | 0–2 | 0–1 | 1–5 |
| Kidderminster Harriers | 2–2 | 3–1 | 1–2 | 4–1 | 5–4 | 0–0 | 3–1 | 2–2 | 0–2 | 1–0 | 2–3 | 1–1 | 3–1 | 6–1 | | 1–1 | 1–2 | 0–3 | 3–2 | 2–0 | 1–1 | 2–0 | 0–1 | 1–1 |
| Lincoln City | 1–1 | 0–1 | 2–1 | 2–0 | 3–3 | 0–1 | 5–0 | 3–0 | 1–3 | 1–1 | 1–0 | 1–2 | 0–1 | 0–2 | 0–1 | | 1–1 | 1–1 | 2–0 | 2–0 | 1–1 | 4–0 | 1–2 | 0–2 |
| Luton Town | 1–1 | 1–0 | 5–1 | 2–0 | 3–1 | 0–1 | 2–0 | 3–0 | 1–2 | 1–1 | 5–1 | 1–1 | 4–2 | 5–0 | 1–0 | 1–0 | | 0–0 | 2–0 | 5–1 | 1–0 | 3–0 | 0–1 | 1–2 |
| Mansfield Town | 1–1 | 3–2 | 7–0 | 1–1 | 4–1 | 1–2 | 5–2 | 1–0 | 1–1 | 1–0 | 1–1 | 2–1 | 3–2 | 3–0 | 0–3 | 2–1 | 1–1 | | 5–0 | 1–3 | 2–1 | 2–1 | 2–0 | 1–1 |
| Newport County | 0–0 | 1–0 | 2–2 | 1–0 | 3–4 | 0–1 | 0–0 | 0–1 | 0–1 | 0–0 | 1–0 | 0–0 | 4–0 | 3–1 | 1–3 | 1–0 | 0–1 | 1–0 | | 0–3 | 1–1 | 1–2 | 0–1 | 2–1 |
| Southport | 3–2 | 2–1 | 2–1 | 2–1 | 0–4 | 1–0 | 2–0 | 3–3 | 0–6 | 1–3 | 1–3 | 1–2 | 1–2 | 0–0 | 1–2 | 2–2 | 3–3 | 3–1 | 1–1 | | 5–0 | 1–1 | 0–0 | 1–1 |
| Stockport County | 2–2 | 0–0 | 3–2 | 4–0 | 1–1 | 0–1 | 3–4 | 1–1 | 2–4 | 0–1 | 0–1 | 2–0 | 3–3 | 1–0 | 2–1 | 4–0 | 1–1 | 0–1 | 2–2 | 0–1 | | 2–0 | 1–0 | 1–2 |
| Tamworth | 2–2 | 2–2 | 2–3 | 0–1 | 1–0 | 2–2 | 1–0 | 1–0 | 0–3 | 0–1 | 1–1 | 1–1 | 2–1 | 2–2 | 0–0 | 4–0 | 1–3 | 0–1 | 2–1 | 2–2 | 1–1 | | 1–2 | 2–1 |
| Wrexham | 4–0 | 0–1 | 2–0 | 2–0 | 5–1 | 1–1 | 2–1 | 1–0 | 2–0 | 1–2 | 2–1 | 2–2 | 4–1 | 4–1 | 2–0 | 2–0 | 2–0 | 1–3 | 0–0 | 2–0 | 4–0 | 3–0 | | 0–3 |
| York City | 0–1 | 0–1 | 3–1 | 1–0 | 6–2 | 2–2 | 2–2 | 3–2 | 0–1 | 1–0 | 1–2 | 2–1 | 2–0 | 7–0 | 2–3 | 2–0 | 3–0 | 2–2 | 1–1 | 1–2 | 2–1 | 0–0 | 0–0 | |

Updated to match(es) played on 28 April 2012. Source: Football Conference
Legend: Blue = home team win; Yellow = draw; Red = away team win.

== Conference North ==
Conference North
- Season: 2011–12
- Champions: Hyde
- Promoted: Hyde; Nuneaton Town
- Relegated: Blyth Spartans; Eastwood Town
- Matches: 462
- Goals: 1,482 (3.21 per match)
- Top goalscorer: (England) Damian Reeves (44)
- Biggest home win: Corby Town 6–1 Bishop's Stortford (17 August 2011); Guiseley 5–0 Blyth Spartans (23 August 2011); Bishop's Stortford 5–0 Hinckley United (29 August 2011); Corby Town 5–0 Eastwood Town (29 August 2011); Altrincham 6–1 Boston United (8 October 2011); FC Halifax Town 6–1 Hinckley United (17 December 2011); Bishop's Stortford 5–0 Droylsden (3 March 2012); Hyde 5–0 Bishop's Stortford (31 March 2012)
- Biggest away win: Colwyn Bay 1–6 Altrincham (20 September 2011); Eastwood Town 1–6 Gainsborough Trinity (25 October 2011); Eastwood Town 0–5 Nuneaton Town (3 December 2011); Colwyn Bay 1–6 Nuneaton Town (18 February 2012); Colwyn Bay 0–5 Hinckley United (17 March 2012); Eastwood Town 1–6 Hinckley United (21 April 2012)
- Highest scoring: Hinckley United 5–5 Stalybridge Celtic (21 January 2012); Histon 5–5 Droylsden (17 April 2012)
- Highest attendance: 1,868; Hyde 1–1 Stalybridge Celtic (26 December 2011)
- Lowest attendance: 141; Colwyn Bay 4–1 Bishop's Stortford (6 March 2012)

A total of 22 teams contested the division, including 17 sides who competed in the 2010–11 season, one transferred from the Conference South, two relegated from the Conference Premier and two promoted from the Northern Premier League.

=== Promotion and relegation ===
Teams promoted from 2010–11 Northern Premier League Premier Division

- FC Halifax Town
- Colwyn Bay

Teams relegated from 2010–11 Conference Premier

- Altrincham
- Histon

Teams transferred from 2010–11 Conference South

- Bishop's Stortford

=== League table ===
| Pos | Team | Pld | W | D | L | GF | GA | GD | Pts | Promotion, qualification or relegation |
|---|---|---|---|---|---|---|---|---|---|---|
| 1 | Hyde (C, P) | 42 | 27 | 9 | 6 | 90 | 36 | +54 | 90 | Promotion to Conference Premier |
| 2 | Guiseley | 42 | 25 | 10 | 7 | 87 | 50 | +37 | 85 | Qualification for the Conference North play-offs |
| 3 | FC Halifax Town | 42 | 21 | 11 | 10 | 80 | 59 | +21 | 74 | Qualification for the Conference North play-offs |
| 4 | Gainsborough Trinity | 42 | 23 | 5 | 14 | 74 | 61 | +13 | 74 | Qualification for the Conference North play-offs |
| 5 | Nuneaton Town (O, P) | 42 | 22 | 12 | 8 | 74 | 41 | +33 | 72 (Note: Nuneaton Town were deducted 6 points for fielding an ineligible player.) | Qualification for the Conference North play-offs |
| 6 | Stalybridge Celtic | 42 | 20 | 11 | 11 | 83 | 64 | +19 | 71 | |
| 7 | Worcester City | 42 | 18 | 11 | 13 | 63 | 58 | +5 | 65 | |
| 8 | Altrincham | 42 | 17 | 10 | 15 | 90 | 71 | +19 | 61 | |
| 9 | Droylsden | 42 | 16 | 11 | 15 | 83 | 86 | −3 | 59 | |
| 10 | Bishop's Stortford | 42 | 17 | 7 | 18 | 70 | 75 | −5 | 58 | |
| 11 | Boston United | 42 | 15 | 9 | 18 | 60 | 67 | −7 | 54 | |
| 12 | Colwyn Bay | 42 | 15 | 8 | 19 | 55 | 70 | −15 | 53 | |
| 13 | Workington | 42 | 14 | 10 | 18 | 56 | 61 | −5 | 52 | |
| 14 | Gloucester City | 42 | 15 | 7 | 20 | 53 | 60 | −7 | 52 | |
| 15 | Harrogate Town | 42 | 14 | 10 | 18 | 59 | 69 | −10 | 52 | |
| 16 | Histon | 42 | 12 | 15 | 15 | 67 | 72 | −5 | 51 | |
| 17 | Corby Town | 42 | 14 | 8 | 20 | 65 | 71 | −6 | 50 | |
| 18 | Vauxhall Motors | 42 | 14 | 8 | 20 | 63 | 78 | −15 | 50 | |
| 19 | Solihull Moors | 42 | 13 | 10 | 19 | 44 | 54 | −10 | 49 | |
| 20 | Hinckley United | 42 | 13 | 9 | 20 | 75 | 90 | −15 | 48 | |
| 21 | Blyth Spartans (R) | 42 | 7 | 13 | 22 | 50 | 80 | −30 | 34 | Relegation to the Northern Premier League Premier Division |
| 22 | Eastwood Town (R) | 42 | 4 | 8 | 30 | 37 | 105 | −68 | 20 | Relegation to the Northern Premier League Premier Division |

Source: Football Conference
Rules for classification: 1) points; 2) goal difference; 3) number of goals scored.
(C) Champions; (O) Play-off winners; (P) Promoted; (R) Relegated

=== Play-offs ===
Semifinals
2 | Guiseley | 1 | 0 | 1
5 | Nuneaton Town (a.e.t.) | 1 | 1 | 2
3 | FC Halifax Town | 2 | 0 | 2
4 | Gainsborough Trinity | 2 | 1 | 3

Final
4 | Gainsborough Trinity | 0
5 | Nuneaton Town | 1

==== Semi-finals – 1st leg ====
| 2 May 2012 | Gainsborough Trinity | 2–2 | FC Halifax Town | The Northolme, Gainsborough |
| 19:45 | Connor 6', 12' | Report | Gregory 43', 84' | Attendance: 2,380 |

| 2 May 2012 | Nuneaton Town | 1–1 | Guiseley | Liberty Way, Nuneaton |
| 19:45 | Glover 2' | Report | Wilson 90+2' | Attendance: 1,476 |

==== Semi-finals – 2nd leg ====
| 6 May 2012 | FC Halifax Town | 0–1 | Gainsborough Trinity | The Shay, Halifax |
| 15:00 | | | Clarke 64' | Attendance: 3,468 |

| 6 May 2012 | Guiseley | 0 – 1 (a.e.t.) | Nuneaton Town | Nethermoor Park, Guiseley |
| 15:00 | | Report | Brown 117' | Attendance: 1,676 |

==== Final ====
| 13 May 2012 | Gainsborough Trinity | 0–1 | Nuneaton Town | The Northolme, Gainsborough |
| 15:00 | | | | Attendance: 3,946 |

=== Stadia and locations ===
Locations of the Conference North 2011–12 teams

| Team | Stadium | Capacity |
|---|---|---|
| FC Halifax Town | The Shay | 10,061 |
| Gloucester City | Whaddon Road (Groundshare with Cheltenham Town) | 7,066 |
| Boston United | York Street | 6,643 |
| Stalybridge Celtic | Bower Fold | 6,500 |
| Altrincham | Moss Lane | 6,085 |
| Eastwood Town | Coronation Park | 5,000 |
| Worcester City | St George's Lane | 4,749 |
| Blyth Spartans | Croft Park | 4,450 |
| Nuneaton Town | Liberty Way | 4,350 |
| Hinckley United | De Montfort Park | 4,329 |
| Gainsborough Trinity | The Northolme | 4,304 |
| Hyde | Ewen Fields | 4,250 |
| Bishop's Stortford | Woodside Park | 4,000 |
| Corby Town | Steel Park | 3,893 |
| Histon | Bridge Road | 3,800 |
| Harrogate Town | Wetherby Road | 3,300 |
| Workington | Borough Park | 3,101 |
| Solihull Moors | Damson Park | 3,050 |
| Droylsden | Butcher's Arms Ground | 3,000 |
| Guiseley | Nethermoor Park | 3,000 |
| Colwyn Bay | Llanelian Road | 2,500 |
| Vauxhall Motors | Rivacre Park | 2,500 |

=== Results ===
| Home \ Away | ALT | BST | BLY | BOS | COL | COR | DRO | EAS | HAL | GAI | GLO | GUI | HAR | HIN | HIS | HYD | NUN | SOL | STL | VAU | WRC | WRK |
|---|---|---|---|---|---|---|---|---|---|---|---|---|---|---|---|---|---|---|---|---|---|---|
| Altrincham | | 0–2 | 2–1 | 6–1 | 3–4 | 1–1 | 5–1 | 2–0 | 1–1 | 2–3 | 1–2 | 2–2 | 5–2 | 2–2 | 3–0 | 1–3 | 2–0 | 1–1 | 2–1 | 3–2 | 4–1 | 1–1 |
| Bishop's Stortford | 1–0 | | 3–3 | 0–1 | 0–2 | 0–2 | 5–0 | 4–0 | 1–3 | 1–1 | 3–2 | 4–1 | 3–4 | 5–0 | 0–2 | 0–1 | 0–3 | 1–0 | 0–3 | 2–0 | 1–1 | 1–1 |
| Blyth Spartans | 1–1 | 3–1 | | 1–0 | 2–2 | 1–2 | 1–3 | 1–0 | 2–3 | 2–3 | 0–1 | 1–2 | 3–3 | 3–3 | 2–1 | 0–1 | 2–3 | 2–1 | 1–1 | 1–2 | 1–2 | 0–3 |
| Boston United | 1–1 | 0–2 | 1–1 | | 2–2 | 1–1 | 2–1 | 4–2 | 0–0 | 1–2 | 2–0 | 3–3 | 0–2 | 2–0 | 1–1 | 0–2 | 0–0 | 0–1 | 3–2 | 1–2 | 2–3 | 2–1 |
| Colwyn Bay | 1–6 | 4–1 | 0–2 | 3–2 | | 0–2 | 6–3 | 2–0 | 0–1 | 2–1 | 4–2 | 1–2 | 2–2 | 0–5 | 2–1 | 0–1 | 1–6 | 0–0 | 2–0 | 0–0 | 0–2 | 1–0 |
| Corby Town | 1–3 | 6–1 | 4–0 | 1–2 | 1–0 | | 5–2 | 5–0 | 2–4 | 1–3 | 0–1 | 0–1 | 0–5 | 0–2 | 0–2 | 0–4 | 0–2 | 0–3 | 1–2 | 1–0 | 2–3 | 3–3 |
| Droylsden | 3–1 | 2–2 | 3–3 | 2–1 | 2–1 | 2–1 | | 3–3 | 2–1 | 1–2 | 1–2 | 2–0 | 1–1 | 2–3 | 2–3 | 2–3 | 2–1 | 1–0 | 3–3 | 5–2 | 4–1 | 1–1 |
| Eastwood Town | 1–6 | 3–4 | 0–0 | 2–2 | 0–1 | 1–4 | 2–2 | | 2–2 | 1–6 | 2–1 | 2–2 | 0–1 | 0–3 | 1–2 | 2–2 | 0–5 | 1–1 | 0–1 | 2–4 | 0–1 | 0–3 |
| FC Halifax Town | 2–4 | 0–1 | 3–0 | 3–2 | 1–1 | 1–3 | 2–1 | 2–1 | | 2–2 | 0–0 | 1–2 | 3–1 | 6–1 | 4–0 | 3–2 | 0–3 | 0–0 | 2–2 | 1–5 | 2–1 | 3–1 |
| Gainsborough Trinity | 2–0 | 4–2 | 2–0 | 1–3 | 2–0 | 1–0 | 1–2 | 2–0 | 0–1 | | 1–4 | 1–0 | 0–1 | 2–1 | 3–2 | 2–0 | 3–1 | 3–1 | 3–1 | 1–1 | 2–2 | 2–0 |
| Gloucester City | 1–1 | 0–2 | 4–0 | 1–3 | 0–1 | 0–0 | 1–3 | 2–0 | 1–3 | 0–2 | | 2–1 | 1–0 | 2–2 | 0–1 | 0–2 | 1–2 | 1–0 | 1–2 | 2–1 | 3–1 | 2–0 |
| Guiseley | 3–2 | 0–1 | 5–0 | 2–1 | 2–0 | 3–0 | 4–3 | 1–2 | 3–4 | 2–0 | 3–2 | | 2–1 | 3–0 | 2–2 | 2–0 | 1–1 | 3–1 | 1–1 | 4–1 | 4–1 | 2–1 |
| Harrogate Town | 3–2 | 1–1 | 0–0 | 0–2 | 4–0 | 6–2 | 0–0 | 2–1 | 0–0 | 2–1 | 2–0 | 0–4 | | 2–1 | 0–0 | 0–3 | 0–2 | 1–1 | 1–1 | 1–2 | 0–2 | 0–0 |
| Hinckley United | 1–4 | 1–3 | 1–3 | 1–2 | 3–1 | 0–3 | 1–1 | 4–0 | 3–2 | 3–0 | 2–3 | 0–1 | 1–2 | | 0–3 | 0–0 | 1–1 | 1–2 | 5–5 | 2–2 | 2–3 | 4–2 |
| Histon | 2–3 | 2–3 | 2–2 | 1–3 | 0–0 | 1–1 | 5–5 | 3–0 | 1–4 | 1–1 | 4–3 | 2–2 | 4–0 | 2–3 | | 1–1 | 1–1 | 3–0 | 0–1 | 3–3 | 1–5 | 2–0 |
| Hyde | 2–1 | 5–0 | 1–0 | 4–1 | 3–2 | 2–2 | 4–0 | 4–1 | 1–1 | 3–1 | 0–0 | 0–1 | 3–2 | 4–0 | 4–0 | | 1–1 | 3–0 | 1–1 | 4–2 | 2–1 | 4–0 |
| Nuneaton Town | 2–1 | 2–0 | 2–2 | 2–0 | 1–1 | 2–0 | 2–1 | 4–0 | 1–0 | 0–1 | 0–0 | 1–1 | 2–0 | 2–5 | 3–2 | 2–0 | | 0–1 | 1–2 | 2–1 | 3–0 | 2–1 |
| Solihull Moors | 2–0 | 3–1 | 2–2 | 1–0 | 1–0 | 1–2 | 0–2 | 0–2 | 1–2 | 5–3 | 1–0 | 0–1 | 5–1 | 1–2 | 0–2 | 1–0 | 0–0 | | 1–1 | 2–3 | 0–0 | 2–1 |
| Stalybridge Celtic | 5–1 | 2–3 | 2–0 | 3–0 | 0–4 | 2–2 | 1–3 | 2–1 | 2–1 | 4–0 | 2–2 | 0–3 | 3–2 | 4–2 | 2–0 | 1–3 | 4–1 | 2–0 | | 4–2 | 2–0 | 1–3 |
| Vauxhall Motors | 2–2 | 4–3 | 2–1 | 0–4 | 1–0 | 2–1 | 1–1 | 1–2 | 1–3 | 3–1 | 0–2 | 1–1 | 0–1 | 1–2 | 1–1 | 0–2 | 1–2 | 2–1 | 1–0 | | 3–2 | 0–1 |
| Worcester City | 3–0 | 2–1 | 2–1 | 3–0 | 0–1 | 0–2 | 0–2 | 1–0 | 1–1 | 2–1 | 2–1 | 2–2 | 3–2 | 1–1 | 1–1 | 2–2 | 1–1 | 3–0 | 0–0 | 2–0 | | 0–1 |
| Workington | 1–2 | 1–1 | 2–0 | 1–2 | 3–1 | 1–1 | 3–1 | 3–0 | 1–2 | 0–2 | 3–0 | 1–3 | 2–1 | 3–1 | 0–0 | 1–2 | 1–1 | 1–1 | 2–5 | 2–1 | 0–0 | |

Updated to match(es) played on 28 April 2012. Source: Football Conference
Legend: Blue = home team win; Yellow = draw; Red = away team win.

== Conference South ==
Conference South
- Season: 2011–12
- Champions: Woking
- Promoted: Woking; Dartford
- Relegated: Hampton & Richmond Borough; Thurrock
- Matches: 462
- Goals: 1,361 (2.95 per match)
- Top goalscorer: (England) Francis Collin (28)
- Biggest home win: Truro City 8–2 Farnborough (25 October 2011); Dartford 6–0 Thurrock (28 January 2012)
- Biggest away win: Sutton United 0–5 Woking (13 August 2011)
- Highest scoring: Truro City 8–2 Farnborough (25 October 2011)
- Highest attendance: 4,048; Woking 3–3 Truro City (21 April 2012)
- Lowest attendance: 156; Thurrock 0–3 Weston-super-Mare (20 August 2011); Thurrock 1–1 Maidenhead United (18 February 2012)

A total of 22 teams contested the division, including 17 previously competing sides, one relegated from the Conference Premier and four promoted from the lower leagues.

=== Promotion and relegation ===
Teams promoted from 2010–11 Isthmian League Premier Division

- Sutton United
- Tonbridge Angels

Teams promoted from 2010–11 Southern League Premier Division

- Truro City
- Salisbury City

Teams relegated from 2010–11 Conference Premier

- Eastbourne Borough

=== League table ===
| Pos | Team | Pld | W | D | L | GF | GA | GD | Pts | Promotion, qualification or relegation |
|---|---|---|---|---|---|---|---|---|---|---|
| 1 | Woking (C, P) | 42 | 30 | 7 | 5 | 92 | 41 | +51 | 97 | Promotion to Conference Premier |
| 2 | Dartford (O, P) | 42 | 26 | 10 | 6 | 89 | 40 | +49 | 88 | Qualification for the Conference South play-offs |
| 3 | Welling United | 42 | 24 | 9 | 9 | 79 | 47 | +32 | 81 | Qualification for the Conference South play-offs |
| 4 | Sutton United | 42 | 20 | 14 | 8 | 68 | 53 | +15 | 74 | Qualification for the Conference South play-offs |
| 5 | Basingstoke Town | 42 | 20 | 11 | 11 | 65 | 50 | +15 | 71 | Qualification for the Conference South play-offs |
| 6 | Chelmsford City | 42 | 18 | 13 | 11 | 67 | 44 | +23 | 67 | |
| 7 | Dover Athletic | 42 | 17 | 15 | 10 | 62 | 49 | +13 | 66 | |
| 8 | Boreham Wood | 42 | 17 | 10 | 15 | 66 | 58 | +8 | 61 | |
| 9 | Tonbridge Angels | 42 | 15 | 12 | 15 | 70 | 67 | +3 | 57 | |
| 10 | Salisbury City | 42 | 15 | 12 | 15 | 55 | 54 | +1 | 57 | |
| 11 | Dorchester Town | 42 | 16 | 8 | 18 | 58 | 65 | −7 | 56 | |
| 12 | Eastleigh | 42 | 15 | 9 | 18 | 57 | 63 | −6 | 54 | |
| 13 | Weston-super-Mare | 42 | 14 | 9 | 19 | 58 | 71 | −13 | 51 | |
| 14 | Truro City | 42 | 13 | 9 | 20 | 65 | 80 | −15 | 48 | |
| 15 | Staines Town | 42 | 12 | 10 | 20 | 53 | 63 | −10 | 46 | |
| 16 | Farnborough | 42 | 15 | 6 | 21 | 52 | 79 | −27 | 46 (Note: Farnborough were deducted 5 points for breach of league financial rules.) | |
| 17 | Bromley | 42 | 10 | 15 | 17 | 52 | 66 | −14 | 45 | |
| 18 | Eastbourne Borough | 42 | 12 | 9 | 21 | 54 | 69 | −15 | 45 | |
| 19 | Havant & Waterlooville | 42 | 11 | 11 | 20 | 64 | 75 | −11 | 44 | |
| 20 | Maidenhead United | 42 | 11 | 10 | 21 | 49 | 74 | −25 | 43 | |
| 21 | Hampton & Richmond Borough (R) | 42 | 10 | 12 | 20 | 53 | 69 | −16 | 42 | Relegation to the Isthmian League Premier Division |
| 22 | Thurrock (R) | 42 | 5 | 11 | 26 | 33 | 84 | −51 | 26 | Relegation to the Isthmian League Premier Division |

Source: Football Conference
Rules for classification: 1) points; 2) goal difference; 3) number of goals scored.
(C) Champions; (O) Play-off winners; (P) Promoted; (R) Relegated

=== Play-offs ===
Semifinals
2 | Dartford | 1 | 2 | 3
5 | Basingstoke Town | 0 | 1 | 1
3 | Welling United | 2 | 0 | 2
4 | Sutton United | 1 | 0 | 1

Final
2 | Dartford | 1
3 | Welling United | 0

==== Semi-finals – 1st leg ====
| 2 May 2012 | Basingstoke Town | 0–1 | Dartford | The Camrose, Basingstoke |
| 19:45 | | Report | Noble 45' | Attendance: 1,691 |

| 2 May 2012 | Sutton United | 1–2 | Welling United | Gander Green Lane, Sutton |
| 19:45 | Holloway 66' (o.g.) | Report | Clarke 24'; Healy 70' | Attendance: 1,455 |

==== Semi-finals – 2nd leg ====
| 6 May 2012 | Dartford | 2–1 | Basingstoke Town | Princes Park, Dartford |
| 15:00 | Bradbrook 57'; Wilkinson 73' | Report | McAuley 68' | Attendance: 2,210 |

| 6 May 2012 | Welling United | 0–0 | Sutton United | Park View Road, Welling |
| 15:00 | | Report | | Attendance: 1,408 |

==== Final ====
| 13 May 2012 | Dartford | 1–0 | Welling United | Princes Park, Dartford |
| 15:00 | Noble 4' | | | Attendance: 4,088 |

=== Stadia and locations ===
Locations of the Conference South 2011–12 teams. (London area teams shown in more detail below)
Locations of the Conference South 2011–12 teams (London area clubs)

| Team | Stadium | Capacity |
|---|---|---|
| Sutton United | Gander Green Lane | 7,032 |
| Dover Athletic | Crabble Stadium | 6,500 |
| Woking | Kingfield Stadium | 6,036 |
| Basingstoke Town | The Camrose | 6,000 |
| Havant & Waterlooville | West Leigh Park | 5,250 |
| Dorchester Town | Avenue Stadium | 5,009 |
| Bromley | Hayes Lane | 5,000 |
| Boreham Wood | Meadow Park | 4,502 |
| Welling United | Park View Road | 4,500 |
| Eastbourne Borough | Priory Lane | 4,134 |
| Dartford | Princes Park | 4,100 |
| Farnborough | Cherrywood Road | 4,000 |
| Salisbury City | Raymond McEnhill Stadium | 3,500 |
| Thurrock | Ship Lane | 3,500 |
| Truro City | Treyew Road | 3,500 |
| Weston-super-Mare | Woodspring Stadium | 3,500 |
| Chelmsford City | Melbourne Stadium | 3,000 |
| Eastleigh | Silverlake Stadium | 3,000 |
| Hampton & Richmond Borough | Beveree Stadium | 3,000 |
| Maidenhead United | York Road | 3,000 |
| Staines Town | Wheatsheaf Park | 3,000 |
| Tonbridge Angels | Longmead Stadium | 3,000 |

=== Results ===
| Home \ Away | BAS | BOR | BRO | CHE | DAR | DOR | DOV | EAB | EAS | FAR | H&R | H&W | MDH | SAL | STA | SUT | THU | TON | TRU | WEL | WSM | WOK |
|---|---|---|---|---|---|---|---|---|---|---|---|---|---|---|---|---|---|---|---|---|---|---|
| Basingstoke Town | | 1–1 | 1–0 | 1–1 | 3–2 | 1–0 | 1–1 | 3–0 | 1–0 | 4–3 | 2–2 | 3–2 | 1–3 | 2–2 | 1–1 | 1–2 | 3–1 | 0–2 | 2–1 | 0–1 | 4–1 | 0–3 |
| Boreham Wood | 1–1 | | 2–1 | 1–3 | 3–1 | 2–2 | 4–2 | 1–1 | 6–1 | 4–0 | 2–1 | 0–1 | 1–0 | 1–1 | 1–2 | 1–1 | 2–1 | 4–2 | 1–2 | 2–1 | 3–0 | 1–2 |
| Bromley | 1–3 | 4–0 | | 1–0 | 1–2 | 0–0 | 0–1 | 1–3 | 0–0 | 1–1 | 1–2 | 0–0 | 0–1 | 2–2 | 1–1 | 3–0 | 0–0 | 2–2 | 1–1 | 1–1 | 1–0 | 2–4 |
| Chelmsford City | 0–1 | 0–0 | 6–1 | | 0–0 | 0–0 | 2–3 | 1–0 | 3–0 | 2–2 | 1–0 | 3–1 | 2–0 | 2–3 | 0–1 | 2–3 | 1–0 | 2–2 | 0–1 | 1–2 | 3–2 | 2–3 |
| Dartford | 4–1 | 2–2 | 3–1 | 0–0 | | 1–1 | 3–1 | 2–1 | 3–0 | 3–0 | 2–1 | 3–1 | 2–1 | 2–0 | 2–1 | 6–1 | 6–0 | 3–1 | 1–2 | 1–0 | 1–1 | 2–3 |
| Dorchester Town | 2–1 | 0–1 | 1–1 | 1–2 | 1–0 | | 1–1 | 0–3 | 1–3 | 3–3 | 1–0 | 3–6 | 4–0 | 0–3 | 0–3 | 0–0 | 3–0 | 3–1 | 2–3 | 3–2 | 1–3 | 0–1 |
| Dover Athletic | 0–0 | 0–2 | 4–1 | 2–1 | 2–2 | 4–0 | | 1–1 | 2–0 | 0–0 | 0–1 | 1–1 | 2–2 | 1–1 | 0–4 | 0–2 | 3–1 | 0–0 | 3–1 | 0–1 | 1–0 | 0–3 |
| Eastbourne Borough | 0–2 | 3–2 | 5–0 | 1–3 | 0–1 | 1–4 | 2–2 | | 3–0 | 1–1 | 2–0 | 2–1 | 0–2 | 1–3 | 0–1 | 0–0 | 2–1 | 1–2 | 2–2 | 0–3 | 1–2 | 2–1 |
| Eastleigh | 0–2 | 2–0 | 0–2 | 1–1 | 2–2 | 0–1 | 2–3 | 2–1 | | 0–1 | 1–1 | 3–2 | 4–1 | 1–1 | 2–1 | 4–0 | 3–2 | 1–2 | 3–1 | 3–0 | 2–1 | 0–0 |
| Farnborough | 1–0 | 4–0 | 2–1 | 1–3 | 1–2 | 1–2 | 0–2 | 1–0 | 1–3 | | 0–2 | 1–0 | 0–3 | 1–0 | 1–0 | 0–3 | 0–2 | 3–2 | 2–1 | 1–4 | 0–1 | 0–1 |
| Hampton & Richmond Borough | 0–2 | 0–1 | 1–2 | 0–4 | 1–3 | 0–2 | 2–2 | 3–1 | 0–4 | 1–0 | | 3–3 | 0–0 | 1–2 | 1–2 | 0–0 | 0–2 | 1–1 | 4–3 | 0–2 | 3–1 | 1–1 |
| Havant & Waterlooville | 0–1 | 2–4 | 1–2 | 2–3 | 0–4 | 4–2 | 0–1 | 0–0 | 0–0 | 5–0 | 2–2 | | 2–1 | 2–1 | 3–2 | 2–2 | 3–0 | 1–1 | 4–1 | 1–2 | 1–1 | 3–4 |
| Maidenhead United | 1–1 | 0–3 | 3–3 | 1–1 | 1–1 | 0–1 | 1–4 | 1–0 | 4–3 | 3–4 | 0–2 | 2–0 | | 0–1 | 1–1 | 1–1 | 4–0 | 0–4 | 1–3 | 0–4 | 1–3 | 0–1 |
| Salisbury City | 1–1 | 0–2 | 0–2 | 0–1 | 1–2 | 0–1 | 0–1 | 3–0 | 2–0 | 1–3 | 4–2 | 4–1 | 0–2 | | 1–0 | 3–1 | 1–1 | 2–0 | 2–1 | 0–0 | 0–0 | 2–0 |
| Staines Town | 0–2 | 2–1 | 4–1 | 1–1 | 1–4 | 0–2 | 0–3 | 1–2 | 2–2 | 1–2 | 1–4 | 1–1 | 0–0 | 0–1 | | 1–4 | 2–3 | 1–1 | 1–1 | 4–2 | 2–1 | 0–1 |
| Sutton United | 1–0 | 2–1 | 1–1 | 3–2 | 0–1 | 3–1 | 0–0 | 1–1 | 2–0 | 2–0 | 2–2 | 2–0 | 4–1 | 5–0 | 1–0 | | 1–1 | 0–1 | 2–2 | 4–3 | 3–2 | 0–5 |
| Thurrock | 1–2 | 1–0 | 1–1 | 0–2 | 0–3 | 2–0 | 0–4 | 1–4 | 1–3 | 0–1 | 0–2 | 0–0 | 1–1 | 1–1 | 1–2 | 0–1 | | 0–0 | 1–1 | 1–4 | 0–3 | 1–1 |
| Tonbridge Angels | 2–3 | 1–1 | 1–1 | 0–0 | 0–1 | 2–1 | 2–3 | 5–1 | 4–0 | 1–5 | 1–0 | 1–2 | 1–0 | 3–1 | 3–2 | 1–4 | 3–2 | | 3–0 | 1–1 | 3–0 | 3–6 |
| Truro City | 2–5 | 2–1 | 1–2 | 0–2 | 1–1 | 0–1 | 1–0 | 0–2 | 2–1 | 8–2 | 3–3 | 0–1 | 1–2 | 2–2 | 2–1 | 0–3 | 3–0 | 2–0 | | 2–3 | 0–1 | 1–4 |
| Welling United | 1–1 | 2–0 | 2–1 | 1–1 | 1–1 | 3–2 | 0–0 | 3–0 | 0–1 | 1–0 | 2–1 | 3–1 | 4–0 | 4–3 | 1–1 | 0–0 | 1–0 | 3–2 | 5–1 | | 2–0 | 3–2 |
| Weston-super-Mare | 2–1 | 4–1 | 0–3 | 1–2 | 0–4 | 0–4 | 1–1 | 3–3 | 0–0 | 5–2 | 1–2 | 3–1 | 4–2 | 2–0 | 2–1 | 0–0 | 2–2 | 2–2 | 0–1 | 2–0 | | 0–3 |
| Woking | 1–0 | 0–0 | 3–2 | 1–1 | 1–0 | 4–1 | 3–1 | 3–1 | 1–0 | 1–0 | 2–1 | 3–0 | 0–2 | 0–0 | 0–1 | 4–1 | 5–1 | 2–1 | 3–3 | 2–1 | 4–1 | |

Updated to match(es) played on 28 April 2012. Source: Football Conference
Legend: Blue = home team win; Yellow = draw; Red = away team win.
