= Kissock =

Kissock is a surname. Notable people with the surname include:

- Chris Kissock (born 1985), Canadian baseball player
- Joe Kissock (1893–1959), New Zealand footballer
- John Paul Kissock (born 1989), English footballer

== See also ==
- Kissock Block Building
- McKissock
