= Amari Morgan-Smith =

English footballer (born 1989)

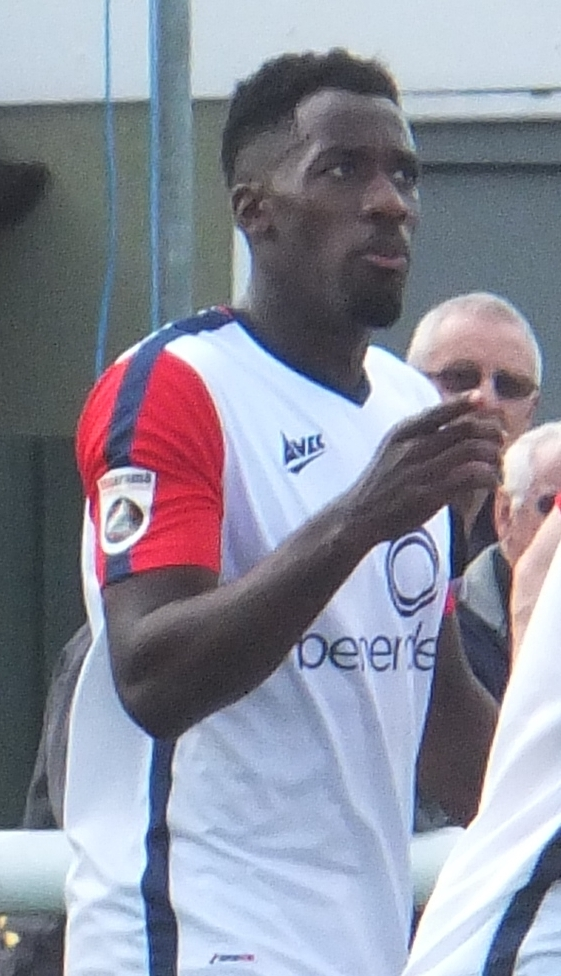
- Morgan-Smith playing for York City in 2017

Personal information
- Full name: Amari Aaron Morgan-Smith
- Date of birth: 3 April 1989 (age 37)
- Place of birth: Wolverhampton, England
- Height: 6 ft 0 in (1.83 m)
- Position: Forward

Team information
- Current team: FC Halifax Town

Youth career
- Wolverhampton Wanderers
- –2007: Crewe Alexandra

Senior career*
Years	Team	Apps	(Gls)
2007–2008	Stockport County	1	(0)
2008–2010	Ilkeston Town	39	(18)
2010–2012	Luton Town	42	(14)
2012–2013	Macclesfield Town	28	(4)
2013	→ Kidderminster Harriers (loan)	5	(1)
2013–2014	Kidderminster Harriers	38	(9)
2014–2015	Oldham Athletic	15	(2)
2015–2017	Cheltenham Town	52	(7)
2017	→ York City (loan)	18	(4)
2017–2018	York City	28	(4)
2018–2019	AFC Telford United	50	(11)
2019–2020	Alfreton Town	30	(15)
2020–2026	Kidderminster Harriers	200	(51)
2026–	FC Halifax Town	0	(0)

International career
2010–2011	England C	2	(0)
- * Club domestic league appearances and goals as of 11:05, 17 July 2026 (UTC)

Amari Aaron Morgan-Smith (born 3 April 1989) is an English professional footballer who plays as a striker for FC Halifax Town.

== Club career ==
=== Early career ===
Born in Wolverhampton, West Midlands, Morgan-Smith began his career in the youth system at Crewe Alexandra. He went on loan to Northern Premier League First Division club Alsager Town late in the 2006–07 season. Morgan-Smith was released in the summer of 2007, before going on trial at Stockport County with 150 other players through the club's Just Search campaign. He was one of just two players signed by Stockport on 5 September 2007 on a one-year professional contract. He made his debut for Stockport on 3 May 2008, coming on as a 66th-minute substitute in a 1–0 home victory over Brentford. Morgan-Smith was released by the club a month later.

=== Ilkeston Town ===
He joined Northern Premier League Premier Division club Ilkeston Town in the summer of 2008, helping the club earn promotion to the Conference North in 2008–09 with a 2–1 win over Nantwich Town on 3 May 2009 in the play-off final. Following his scoring prowess, Ilkeston manager Kevin Wilson described Morgan-Smith as "one of the hottest properties in non-league football". During the summer of 2010, Morgan-Smith trained with Championship club Derby County on a trial period, though the club opted against signing him. On 8 September, Ilkeston were liquidated by HM Revenue and Customs over a £50,000 unpaid tax bill. Morgan-Smith was therefore released from the club with immediate effect. He joined League One club Carlisle United on trial on 21 September, but was not offered a contract.

=== Luton Town ===
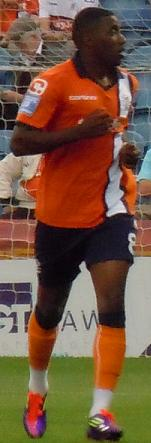
Morgan-Smith playing for Luton Town in 2011

On 28 September 2010, he joined Conference Premier club Luton Town on a two-year contract. He played the same day in a 2–0 victory over Mansfield Town, scoring on his debut. Morgan-Smith scored a hat-trick for the club in a 4–0 FA Cup win against St Albans City on 23 October 2010. This led to him winning the award for Player of the Round.

Morgan-Smith started 2011–12 on form, scoring nine goals in 13 league matches, before a succession of serious injuries kept him out for most of the remaining campaign. The uncertainty over his fitness led to Luton manager Paul Buckle releasing him from his contract in June 2012.

He was taken on trial by League One club Doncaster Rovers during pre-season, scoring against Hull City in a friendly, but was not offered a contract.

=== Macclesfield Town ===
On 31 August 2012, Morgan-Smith signed for Conference Premier club Macclesfield Town on a one-year contract. He made his debut for the club on 1 September 2012 in a 4–1 defeat against his former club Luton Town.

On 31 January 2013, he signed on loan for Kidderminster Harriers for a month. He made five appearances for the club, scoring in a 3–1 victory over Alfreton Town. He was recalled from his loan early by Macclesfield and went on to play in eight further matches, scoring twice. He was released at the end of the season after scoring four goals in 28 appearances.

=== Kidderminster Harriers ===
After training with Mansfield Town and his former club Luton Town in the summer of 2013, Morgan-Smith signed for Kidderminster Harriers on a short-term contract on 5 September 2013. He scored two goals in a 4–1 win against Forest Green Rovers on 8 October 2013. On 11 November 2013, he extended his contract until the end of the season after impressing with 3 goals in 11 appearances.

Manager Gary Whild stated on 4 June 2014 that it was likely Morgan-Smith would be leaving the club. Morgan-Smith turned down the offer of a new contract.

=== Oldham Athletic ===
He signed for League One club Oldham Athletic on 21 July 2014 on a one-year contract, with the option of a further year.

=== Cheltenham Town ===
On 29 May 2015, Morgan-Smith signed a one-year contract with newly relegated National League club Cheltenham Town.

=== York City and AFC Telford United ===
On 12 January 2017, Morgan-Smith joined National League club York City on loan until the end of 2016–17. On 21 May 2017, he started as York beat Macclesfield Town 3–2 at Wembley Stadium in the 2017 FA Trophy final. He was released by Cheltenham at the end of 2016–17.

On 30 June 2017, Morgan-Smith re-signed for York City permanently on a one-year contract.

He signed for York's National League North rivals AFC Telford United on 2 February 2018 on a one-and-a-half-year contract.

=== Alfreton Town ===
On 13 July 2019, Morgan-Smith joined Alfreton Town.

=== Return to Kidderminster Harriers ===
On 25 June 2020, Morgan-Smith signed for Kidderminster Harriers on a one-year contract, almost 8 years after first joining on loan from Macclesfield. The transfer fee was paid personally by the Harrier's owners during the COVID-19 pandemic to ensure no impact to the club finances. He scored twice in a pre-season friendly vs Alvechurch that September, as league start dates were pushed back to October due to the pandemic. Across the 2021–22 season, Morgan-Smith scored 17 goals, including one against Reading in the FA Cup third round. He became an integral part of the Harriers line-up and, on 13 April 2022, extended his deal until the end of the 2022–23 season.

=== FC Halifax Town ===
In July 2026, he signed for FC Halifax Town.

== International career ==
Morgan-Smith was called up to the England national C team for a match against the Republic of Ireland under-23 team in May 2010, in which he made his debut. He was capped twice by England C from 2010 to 2011.

== Controversy ==
In October 2020 Morgan-Smith was sent off while playing for Kidderminster during the first half of a match against Chester for using offensive language. He subsequently admitted an aggravated breach of F.A. rule E3.1, which amounts to using offensive language which includes a (direct or indirect) reference to: "ethnic origin, colour, race, nationality, religion or belief, gender, gender reassignment, sexual orientation or disability". He was handed a six-match suspension, with an order to attend an FA educational course at a future date and meet a contribution of the Hearing costs.

== Career statistics ==
As of 2 April 2024

Appearances and goals by club, season and competition
Club	Season	League			FA Cup		EFL Cup		Other		Total	
Club	Season	Division	Apps	Goals	Apps	Goals	Apps	Goals	Apps	Goals	Apps	Goals
Stockport County	2007–08	League Two	1	0	0	0	—		0	0	1	0
Ilkeston Town (Note: The Ilkeston Town appearances and goals only cover the 2009–10 season.)	2009–10	Conference North	39	18	5	3	—		2 (Note: Appearance(s) in FA Trophy)	0	46	21
Luton Town	2010–11	Conference Premier	20	5	3	3	—		4	0	27	8
Luton Town	2011–12	Conference Premier	17	9	1	0	—		3 (Note: One appearance and one goal in FA Trophy, two appearances in Conference Premier play-offs)	1	21	10
Luton Town	Total		37	14	4	3	—		7	1	48	18
Macclesfield Town	2012–13	Conference Premier	24	4	5	1	—		1	0	30	5
Kidderminster Harriers (loan)	2012–13	Conference Premier	5	1	—		—		—		5	1
Kidderminster Harriers	2013–14	Conference Premier	37	9	7	2	—		0	0	44	11
Kidderminster Harriers	Total		42	10	7	2	—		0	0	49	12
Oldham Athletic	2014–15	League One	13	2	1	0	0	0	1 (Note: Appearance in Football League Trophy)	0	15	2
Cheltenham Town	2015–16	National League	27	5	2	0	—		0	0	29	5
Cheltenham Town	2016–17	League Two	17	0	2	0	2	0	4 (Note: Appearances in EFL Trophy)	2	25	2
Cheltenham Town	Total		44	5	4	0	2	0	4	2	54	7
York City (loan)	2016–17	National League	18	4	—		—		6	2	24	6
York City	2017–18	National League North	28	4	2	0	—		2	1	32	5
York City	Total		46	8	2	0	—		8	3	56	11
AFC Telford United	2017–18	National League North	14	3	—		—		—		14	3
Kidderminster Harriers	2021–22	National League North	33	11	4	2			1	0	38	14
Kidderminster Harriers	2022–23	National League North	43	11	0	0			0	0	43	11
Kidderminster Harriers	2023–24	National League	42	10	1	0			0	0	43	10
Kidderminster Harriers	2024–25	National League North	41	13	4	3			3	2	47	18
Kidderminster Harriers	2025–26	National League North	41	6	1	0			4	1	47	18
Total			200	51	10	5	—		8	3	218	59
Career total			460	115	38	14	2	0	31	9	531	138

== Honours ==
Ilkeston Town

- Northern Premier League Premier Division play-offs: 2009

Cheltenham Town

- National League: 2015–16

York City

- FA Trophy: 2016–17

Kidderminster Harriers

- National League North play-offs: 2023, 2026

Individual

- National League North Player of the Month: December 2024
