= John Paul Kissock =

English footballer (born 1989)

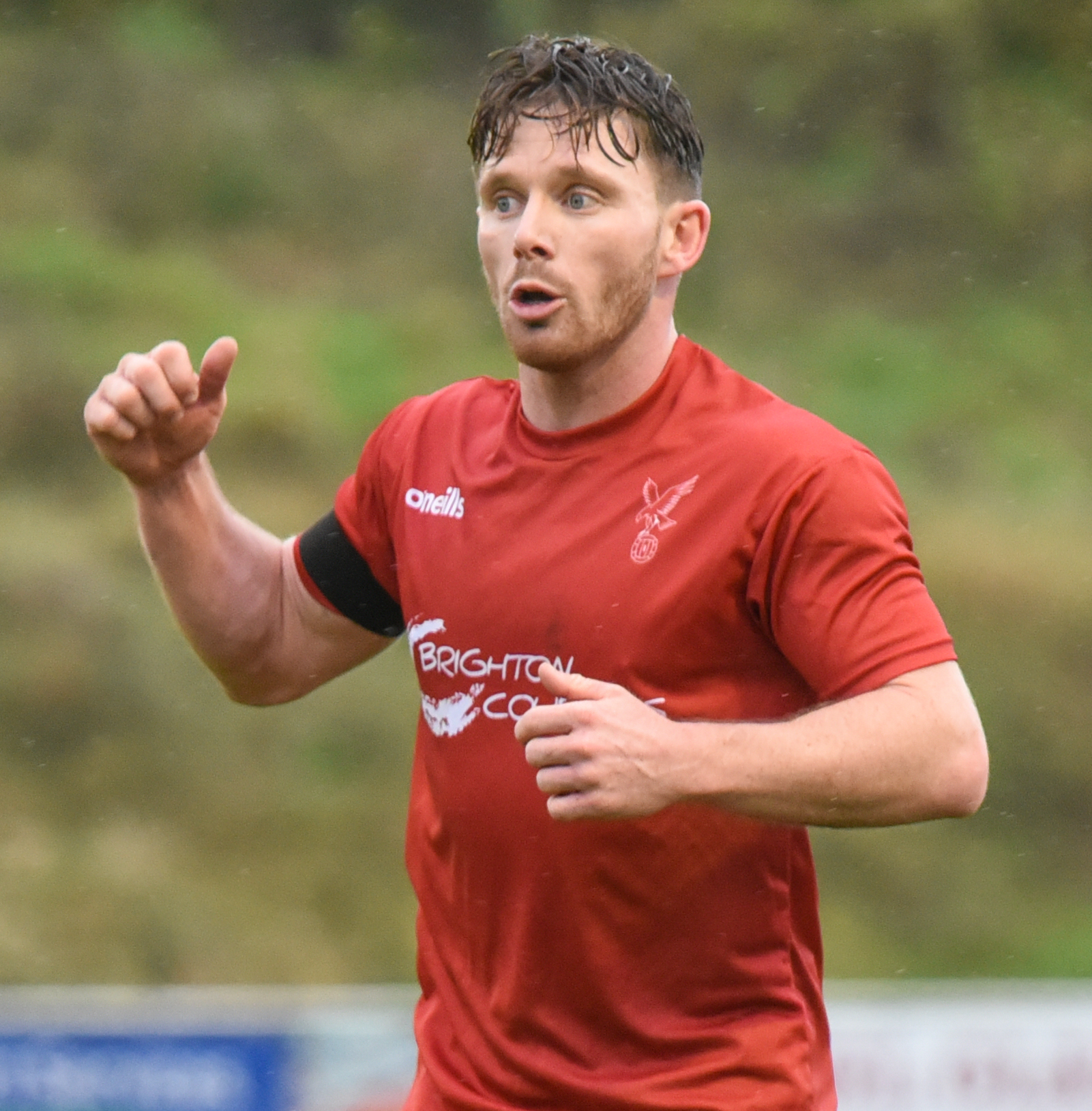
- Kissock playing for Whitehawk in January 2020

Personal information
- Full name: John Paul Kissock
- Date of birth: 2 December 1989 (age 36)
- Place of birth: Fazakerley, England
- Height: 1.68 m (5 ft 6 in)
- Position: Midfielder

Youth career
- 1997–2006: Everton

Senior career*
Years	Team	Apps	(Gls)
2006–2009	Everton	0	(0)
2008	→ Gretna (loan)	11	(0)
2009	→ Accrington Stanley (loan)	5	(0)
2009	Hamilton Academical	2	(0)
2010	Newton	?	(?)
2010	Formby	?	(?)
2010–2011	Southport	28	(4)
2011–2013	Luton Town	21	(0)
2012–2013	→ Macclesfield Town (loan)	11	(1)
2013–2014	Macclesfield Town	29	(0)
2014	→ Oldham Athletic (loan)	4	(0)
2014–2015	Whitehawk	33	(0)
2015–2017	Ebbsfleet United	43	(1)
2016–2017	→ Telford United (loan)	16	(1)
2017–2018	Southport	4	(0)
2018–2019	Welling United	17	(0)
2019–2020	Whitehawk	44	(1)

International career
2004–2005	England U16	4	(0)
2006	England U18	1	(0)
2011	England C	1	(0)

Managerial career
- 2019–2020: Whitehawk (Assistant Manager)
- * Club domestic league appearances and goals

John Paul Kissock (born 2 December 1989) is an English association footballer who last appeared as player-assistant manager at Whitehawk. He plays as a midfielder.

Born in the north Liverpool suburb of Fazakerley, Kissock joined Premier League club Everton's youth system aged seven; progressing quickly, he began playing for England's under-16 team in November 2004, aged only 14. He appeared for England's under-18 side in September 2006, aged 16, and signed professionally for Everton on 12 December 2006. He became a regular player for the club's under-18 and reserve teams and was an unused substitute for the first team on numerous occasions. Following loan spells at Scottish Premier League club Gretna – for whom he made his professional debut on 9 February 2008 – and English fourth-tier side Accrington Stanley the following year, he was released by Everton at the end of the 2008–09 season.

Kissock briefly returned to Scotland at the start of the next season, joining Hamilton Academical in August 2009 but was let go by the club after three appearances in four months. He trialled at various English Football League clubs during the 2010–11 pre-season but failed to win a contract, leading him to begin the season playing for amateur side Newton in the eleventh-tier West Cheshire League. He transferred to ninth-level Formby in October 2010 and only two months after that moved up another four levels when he signed for Southport of the Conference Premier, having impressed the club's manager, Liam Watson. Kissock performed well for Southport during the second half of 2010–11, and after playing four matches in the 2011–12 season signed for Luton Town on 26 August 2011.

== Career ==
=== Early career ===
Born in Fazakerley, Liverpool, Kissock played for youth side Key Ways from the age of six and joined the academy of Premier League club Everton, his favourite team, a year later. At Key Ways he had played alongside Lee Molyneux, who joined Kissock in Everton's youth system in 2000, and Charlie Barnett, later an apprentice with Liverpool. While studying at Archbishop Beck High School, Kissock was first picked for the England under-16 team in November 2004, when he was aged 14, for a match against the under-16s' Scottish counterparts. He played for England under-16s three more times during 2005 and in April that year was voted Liverpool Young Sports Personality of the Year.

Over the following year Kissock became a regular player for Everton's under-18 and reserve sides. In the process he broke Wayne Rooney's record as the youngest ever player to play for Everton's reserve team and played for the England under-18 team against France in September 2006. He was called up to the first team for a UEFA Cup game against AZ in December 2007 but failed to make the final match day squad. During the 2007–08 season he joined the first-team squad for twelve Premier League games, but did not play. In January 2008 he joined Scottish Premier League club Gretna on loan until the end of the season, and it was for them that he made his professional debut in Gretna's 2–0 away defeat against Heart of Midlothian on 9 February 2008. He finished the season with 11 league appearances.

After returning to Everton, he appeared on the substitutes' bench regularly during the first half of the 2008–09 season, and was once again sent on loan in January 2009, this time for a month-long spell at English League Two club Accrington Stanley, where he made five appearances. After his release from Everton at the end of the season, Kissock returned to Scotland on 14 August 2009, when he signed for Scottish Premier League club Hamilton Academical. After joining Hamilton, Kissock says his departure from Everton left him in tears, having support Everton and spending twelve at the club and that Hamilton saved his football career However, only four months and three matches for Hamilton, he was released on 3 December 2009.

=== Into non-League ===
During the 2010–11 pre-season, Kissock had trials with League One clubs Brighton & Hove Albion and Milton Keynes Dons but failed to win a contract with either. He started the season playing for his brother's team Newton F.C. in the eleventh-tier West Cheshire League, before swiftly moving up two divisions with a transfer to North West Counties League club Formby in October 2010. He immediately showed prowess, scoring in each of his first two games, one with a shot from inside his own half; these goals drew the attention of Liam Watson, manager of Conference Premier club Southport, who brought Kissock to his club in December 2010. The new signing made his first appearance for Southport on 28 December in a match against Fleetwood Town, and scored his first goal for the club in their 5–1 victory over Gateshead on 3 January 2011, also winning the man-of-the-match award. In the words of Liverpool Echo journalist Philip Kirkbride, Kissock was an "instant hit", performing well throughout the rest of the season while the team struggled while battling relegation. Despite their improvement since the addition of Kissock, Southport ended the season in the relegation zone; however, they remained in the division as a result of Rushden & Diamonds' expulsion in June 2011 for financial reasons. Having finished 21st out of the 24 teams, in the highest of the four relegation spots, they were retained in Rushden's place.

Kissock started the 2011–12 season with four appearances for Southport and scored the team's first goal of the season in their first match of the season, against Lincoln City on 13 August 2011. A week later he set up Jonathan Brown for the opening goal in the team's 5–1 away loss against Luton Town, and on 24 August he was called up to the England C team, a national squad made up of non-League players. (Note: Kissock was called up by the England C team on 24 August 2011 for a match against India's under-23 squad, scheduled for 6 September. However, the match was cancelled on 25 August.) Two days later he joined Luton, signing a two-year contract. As well as paying an undisclosed transfer fee, his new team loaned two players to Southport as part of the deal, lending them midfielder Godfrey Poku and forward Dan Walker until January 2012. Kissock first appeared for his new club on 27 August as a substitute in a 3–1 win over Braintree Town, and made his first start on 2 September in a 1–1 draw away against Stockport County. He played well, especially in the latter, and received a strongly positive reception from Luton fans.

Kissock showed the magic that has already endeared him to [Luton] Town fans as he wriggled past Lincoln defenders into the box...

— Excerpt from official Luton Town F.C. match report, 17 September 2011

Having already scored against Lincoln for Southport on the opening day of the season, Kissock appeared against them for the second time in two months on 17 September when Luton were pitted against them at Kenilworth Road. Kissock came off the bench after 67 minutes with the game goalless and was instrumental in Luton's eventual victory. With six minutes left to play, standing near the left-hand corner of the penalty area and the goal line, he received a short corner from Adam Watkins. Kissock twisted past a Lincoln defender, and turning quickly, ran towards the net along the byline; from a tight angle he crossed the ball low for forward Stuart Fleetwood, who was waiting in the middle of the six-yard box. In the words of the official club match report, Fleetwood "couldn't miss" from such short range; he prodded the ball home to score the only goal of the game. Mark Wood's match report for The Luton News called Kissock's assist "a moment of magic"; "wonderfully inventive".

Kissock was called into the England C team once again in November 2011 and made his debut in a 3–1 loss to Gibraltar.

On 21 January 2012 Kissock returned to Southport for the first time since leaving them for the Hatters, making his first league start since late September for Luton Town. Kissock was substituted after 63 minutes, he reacted badly to the manager's intervention and the pair conducted an altercation in the dugout. Luton Town manager Gary Brabin explained after the match that his decision to substitute Kissock was tactical and he also felt John looked a little jaded from his excellent performance in the Hatters previous game. Gary Brabin went on to say that Kissock's behaviour was "Disrespectful to me, to his team mates, also to the fans and the club"

On 9 July 2012, Kissock joined Conference Premier newcomers Macclesfield Town on loan until January 2013. His transfer was then made permanent in January for cash plus Arnaud Mendy deal.

=== Oldham Athletic (loan) ===
On 30 January 2014, Oldham Athletic signed Kissock on loan until the end of the season with a view to a permanent move. Upon arrival, Oldham Athletic manager Lee Johnson stated "JP is an interesting one, he is someone I have followed for a long time I have always thought he was a really good player. It may appear to be an unfashionable signing, but sometimes as a manager you have to weigh up the value, age, pedigree and talent and take a chance. This is such an occasion". Kissock was delighted with the move and said "It's an unbelievable opportunity that the gaffer has offered me. To be back in the Football League after a few years in non-league is something I have worked hard for. I am delighted to be given this chance and I am really looking forward to being part of the squad".

Upon the end of his loan at the end of the season, Kissock had made 4 appearances for the club during an injury-ravaged spell.

=== Whitehawk ===
Kissock left Macclesfield by mutual consent on 1 August 2014. Seven days later, he joined Conference South side Whitehawk.

=== Ebbsfleet United ===
He played for Ebbsfleet United before being released by the club in June 2017.

=== Southport (second spell) ===
In July 2017 he re-joined Southport for his second spell with the club.

=== Welling United ===
In June 2018 he joined Welling United.

=== Whitehawk (second spell) ===
In January 2019 he re-signed for Whitehawk of the Isthmian League Premier Division and was appointed player assistant manager for the start of the following season. Kissock continued to commute from Liverpool and after the 2019–20 season ended prematurely, he returned permanently to the north to concentrate on his business.

== Style of play ==
Kissock primarily plays as an attacking midfielder, though he has been known to play just behind the forward in the 'hole', acting as the offensive pivot to teams. Described by Kirkbride in April 2011 as Southport's "creative spark", club manager Liam Watson based his team's tactics around the Liverpudlian; the Southport Visiter wrote soon after Kissock's move to Luton that he had been "the creative force Southport looked to". Kissock's strengths lie in his technical ability, passing, always available for a pass and proficiency with both feet. Kissock's footballing inspirations are Argentine players Diego Maradona and Lionel Messi, the latter of whom he is compared to by Luton and Macclesfield supporters due to his skilful play and similar appearance.

== Career statistics ==
Appearances and goals by club, season and competition
Club	Season	League			National Cup		League Cup		Other		Total	
Club	Season	Division	Apps	Goals	Apps	Goals	Apps	Goals	Apps	Goals	Apps	Goals
Everton	2007–08	Premier League	0	0	0	0	0	0	0	0	0	0
Everton	2008–09	Premier League	0	0	0	0	0	0	0	0	0	0
Everton	Total		0	0	0	0	0	0	0	0	0	0
Gretna (loan)	2007–08	Scottish Premier League	11	0	0	0	0	0	0	0	11	0
Accrington Stanley (loan)	2008–09	League Two	5	0	0	0	0	0	0	0	5	0
Hamilton Academical	2009–10	Scottish Premier League	2	0	0	0	1	0	0	0	3	0
Southport	2010–11	Football Conference	24	3	0	0	—		0	0	24	3
Southport	2011–12	Football Conference	4	1	0	0	—		0	0	4	1
Southport	Total		28	4	0	0	0	0	0	0	28	4
Luton Town	2011–12	Football Conference	21	0	3	0	—		0	0	31	1
Macclesfield Town (loan)	2012–13	Football Conference	8	1	0	0	—		0	0	8	1
Career total			75	5	3	0	1	0	0	0	76	6
