= Lee Clarke =

Footballer (born 1983)

Personal information
- Full name: Lee Colin Clarke
- Date of birth: 28 July 1983 (age 43)
- Place of birth: Peterborough, England
- Position: Central midfielder

Team information
- Current team: St Neots Town

Senior career*
Years	Team	Apps	(Gls)
2000–2001	Yaxley	?	(?)
2001–2004	Peterborough United	2	(0)
2003	→ Kettering Town (loan)	9	(3)
2004–2009	St Albans City	196	(79)
2009–2014	Welling United	197	(59)
2014	St Albans City		
2014–2016	Spalding United		
2016–	St Neots Town		

International career
2003–2004	Northern Ireland U21	4	(0)
2004	Northern Ireland U23	1	(0)

Managerial career
- 2016–2017: St Neots Town (caretaker)
- * Club domestic league appearances and goals as of 11:45, 15 May 2014 (UTC)

Lee Colin Clarke (born 28 July 1983) is a professional footballer. Born in England, he represented Northern Ireland internationally at youth levels U21 and U23. He is the son of former Northern Ireland international Colin Clarke.

== Career ==
Clarke started his career at Yaxley, then moved to Peterborough United where he made several appearances. He then moved to St Albans City, where he was the top scorer for two seasons in the Conference South and was vital in their promotion to the Conference National in 2006.

He has won five caps for the Northern Ireland U21s.

On 2 April 2009, Clarke had his contract cancelled by mutual consent because of his nagging knee injury that prevented him from playing for most of the season.

In May 2009, he signed for Welling United. He was voted supporters' player of the season at the end of the 2010–11 campaign, and captained Welling to the Conference South title in 2012–13.

In May 2014 it was announced that Clarke had resigned for St Albans City.

In February 2015 Clarke signed for St Neots Town, scoring on his debut.
