= Charlie Henry (footballer, born 1986) =

English footballer

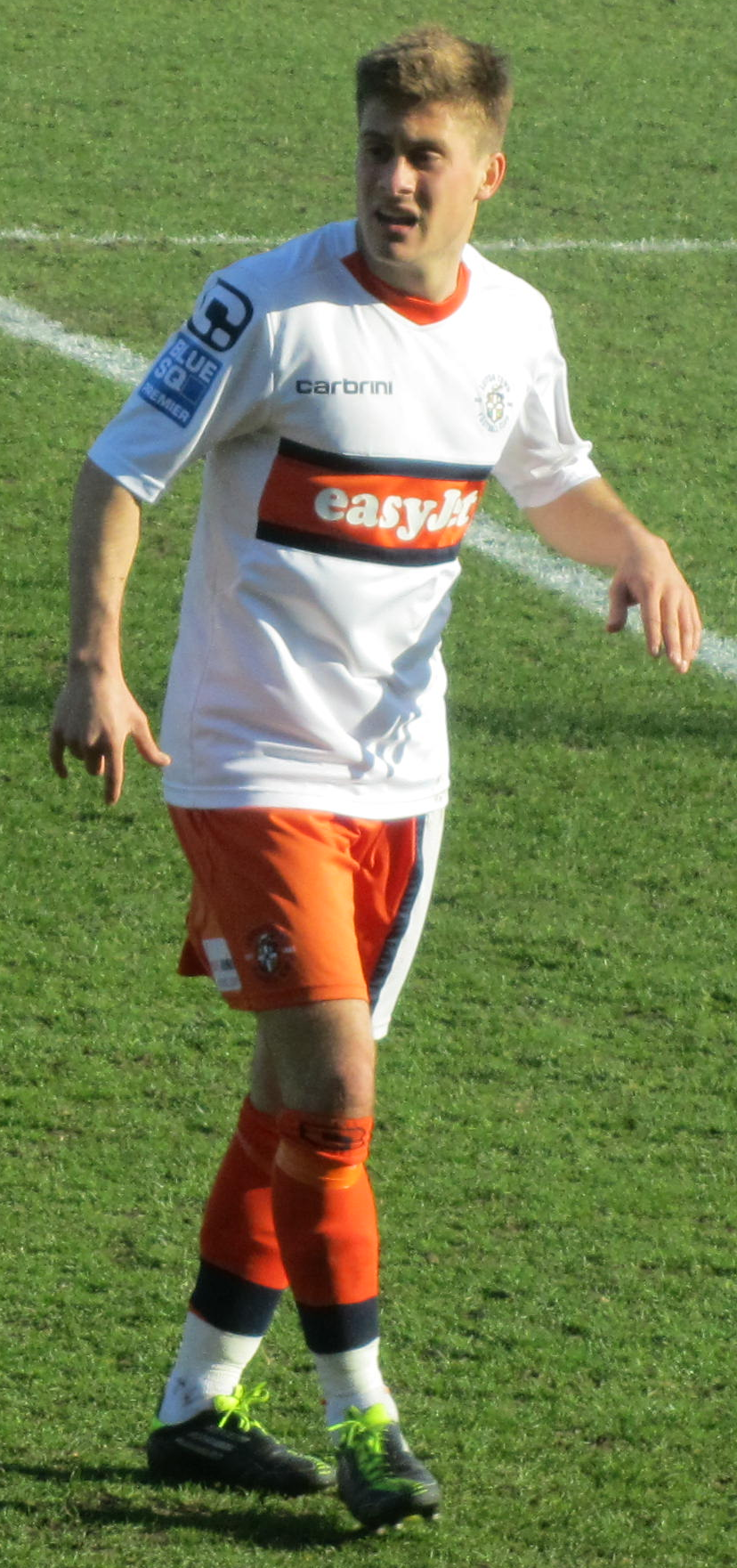
- Henry playing for Luton Town

Personal information
- Full name: Charles Henry
- Date of birth: 28 September 1986 (age 40)
- Place of birth: Stevenage, England
- Position: Midfielder

Youth career
- 1997–2001: Luton Town

Senior career*
Years	Team	Apps	(Gls)
2003–2005	Buntingford Town	16	(28)
2005–2006	Arlesey Town	13	(1)
2005	Wycombe Wanderers	0	(0)
2006	Grays Athletic	0	(0)
2006	Haverhill Rovers		
2006–2007	Cambridge City	31	(6)
2007	Dorchester Town	18	(6)
2007–2009	Havant & Waterlooville	37	(8)
2009–2011	Newport County	55	(11)
2010–2011	→ Luton Town (loan)	0	(0)
2011–2012	Luton Town	2	(0)
2011–2012	→ Aldershot Town (loan)	6	(0)
2012–2013	Macclesfield Town	15	(1)
2013	→ AFC Telford United (loan)	5	(0)
2013	Whitehawk	10	(5)
2013	Chelmsford City	8	(0)
2013	Team Wellington	12	(8)
2014–2015	Dunstable Town	40	(6)
2015	Chelmsford City	6	(1)

International career^{‡}
2010	England C	2	(0)
- * Club domestic league appearances and goals as of 03:28, 25 October 2015 (UTC) ‡ National team caps and goals as of 15:45, 4 May 2012 (UTC)

Charles Henry (born 28 September 1986) is an English former professional footballer who played as a winger. He has also represented the England national football C team as a midfielder.

== Club career ==
=== Early career ===
Born in Stevenage, Hertfordshire, Henry began his career with Luton Town as a youngster, but was released at the age of 15, being told by then Luton youth coach Dean Rastrick that he was "too small". He then played local football for Buntingford Town and then Arlesey Town at the age of 17, before signing for Wycombe Wanderers on non-contract terms on 21 November 2005. Released by the Chairboys, Henry signed for Grays Athletic in March 2006.

=== Haverhill Rovers ===
Shin splints put an end to his time with Grays and he moved to Haverhill Rovers in July 2006. He scored some vital goals at the Croft ground, helping Haverhill reach the FA Cup Fourth Qualifying Round for the first time in their 125-year history during the 2006–07 campaign, before the minnows finally bowed out to Aldershot Town.

=== Cambridge City ===
His form alerted Cambridge City manager Gary Roberts and he was soon thrust into the Lilywhites side where he impressed, bagging 6 goals in 31 appearances. He became something of a crowd favourite at Milton Road with his penetrating runs, powerful shots and wild 'somersault' goal celebrations.

=== Dorchester Town ===
Such was his form at Cambridge City, that it alerted the attentions of Dorchester Town, who signed Henry on a two-year contract in July 2007 for a fee of £7,500. With Dorchester having just turned professional, it represented a chance for Henry to play football on a full-time basis.

=== Havant & Waterlooville ===
After just three months at Dorchester, and six goals in 18 appearances, he signed for Havant & Waterlooville on 23 November 2007 for an undisclosed fee. Henry made 16 appearances and scored twice in the 2007–08 season and in the 2008–09 season, scored 6 goals in just 21 appearances. He left the club at the end of the 2008-09 season.

=== Newport County ===
Henry signed for Newport County on 18 June 2009, under the management of Dean Holdsworth, on a one-year contract, having scoring several times against the Newport for his former clubs.

He became a fan favourite at Spytty Park and he fired nine goals in 35 appearances during his first season with the Exiles, the 2009–10 campaign, as Newport won the Conference South title with a record 103 points. On 25 May 2010, Henry signed a new one-year contract with the club.

Playing at Conference Premier level for the first time in his career, Henry was again a key figure for Newport County during the 2010–11 campaign as the Exiles were the surprise package in the league and play-off contenders in the first half of the season.

=== Luton Town ===
After scoring at Kenilworth Road for Newport County in a 1–1 draw on 24 August 2010 Henry was on the radar of Luton manager Richard Money, who had already been impressed with Henry after spotting him in a pre-season match against Stevenage. On 26 November 2010, Henry signed for Luton, initially on loan, before making the move permanent on 5 January 2011, returning to Kenilworth Road nine years after being released as a 15-year-old. Although delighted to be joining Luton Town – an opportunity Henry said was too good to turn down – he did express his sadness at leaving Newport County, saying, "It's very difficult and in a lot of ways I am gutted to be leaving. I've had the best two years of my life down here and the best time in my career by an absolute mile."

Upon returning to Luton, Henry expressed his delight at being given a second opportunity with the Hatters. However, a detached ligament in his foot sustained whilst playing for Newport County proved more serious than initially thought by the Luton Town medical staff, and Henry was sidelined for the remainder of the 2010–11 season with an injury that manager Richard Money described as "one in a million".

Henry eventually made his debut for Luton the next season, coming on as a substitute in the club's 5–1 victory against Hendon in the FA Cup Fourth Qualifying Round on 29 October 2011, 11 months after initially joining the club. Henry described his appearance as "unbelievable" and admitted there were times during his injury where he thought his career was over.

On 24 November 2011, Henry was sent on a two-month loan to League Two side Aldershot Town to build up match fitness. He made six appearances before returning to Luton on 22 January 2012.

Henry made his first league appearance for Luton as a substitute in a 1–1 draw with Darlington on 13 March 2012. He ended the season having played six games for the club, before being released on 30 April.

=== Macclesfield Town ===
In 2012 Henry joined Macclesfield Town. On 8 February 2013 he joined AFC Telford United on a one-month loan. On 14 March, Henry decided to terminate his contract with Macclesfield Town after failing to settle in the area.

=== Team Wellington ===
In November 2013, Henry made the move to New Zealand to sign for ASB Premiership club Team Wellington, signing a contract in effect until March 2014. He made an immediate impact, scoring on his debut home starting appearance in a 3–1 defeat of Southern United on 24 November 2013. He went on to score regularly, taking his tally of goals to six in eleven appearances when netting twice in a 6–1 victory over Hawke's Bay United on 2 February 2014.

=== Dunstable Town ===
After a stint in New Zealand's ASB Premiership for Team Wellington, Henry signed for Dunstable Town in the summer of 2014 following their promotion for the Southern Premier Division.

== International career ==
Henry's form with Newport County in 2010 earned him a call-up in the England national football C team, where he made his debut in a 2–2 draw with Wales. A month later, he earned his second cap, picking up the man-of-the-match award in a 1–0 victory over Estonia U23 in Tallinn in the International Challenge Trophy.

== Honours ==
=== Club ===
Newport County

- Conference South: 2009–10
