= McKissock =

McKissock is a surname. Notable people with the surname include:

- Andrew McKissock (1873–1919), Australian politician
- Dave McKissock, New Zealand footballer
- Thomas McKissock (1790–1866), American politician
- Wylie McKissock (1906–1994), English neurosurgeon

== See also ==
- Kissock
- McKissic
