= Stuart Fleetwood =

English footballer (born 1986)

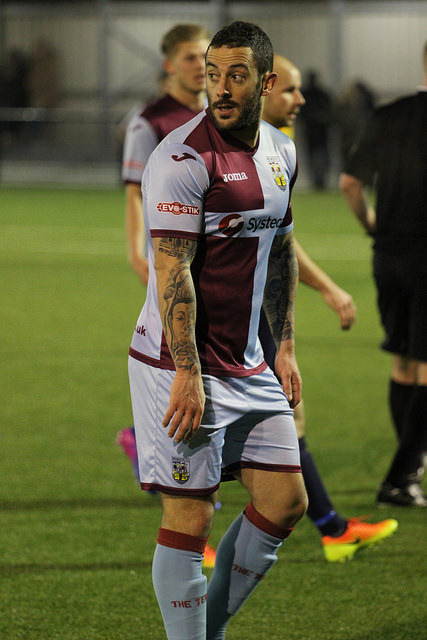
- Fleetwood playing for Weymouth in 2017

Personal information
- Full name: Stuart Keith Wakley Fleetwood
- Date of birth: 23 April 1986 (age 40)
- Place of birth: Gloucester, England
- Height: 5 ft 10 in (1.78 m)
- Position: Striker

Youth career
- 1998–2003: Cardiff City

Senior career*
Years	Team	Apps	(Gls)
2003–2006	Cardiff City	8	(0)
2006–2007	Hereford United	44	(8)
2007	→ Accrington Stanley (loan)	3	(0)
2007–2008	Forest Green Rovers	41	(28)
2008–2010	Charlton Athletic	0	(0)
2008	→ Cheltenham Town (loan)	6	(2)
2008–2009	→ Brighton & Hove Albion (loan)	11	(0)
2009	→ Exeter City (loan)	9	(3)
2009–2010	→ Exeter City (loan)	27	(4)
2010–2011	Hereford United	48	(14)
2011–2013	Luton Town	67	(21)
2013–2015	Eastleigh	53	(12)
2015	→ Forest Green Rovers (loan)	16	(0)
2015–2016	Sutton United	26	(0)
2016–2017	Bath City	11	(1)
2016–2017	→ Weymouth (loan)	31	(17)
2017	Merthyr Town	?	(3)
2017–2018	Redditch United	?	(13)
2018–2020	Swindon Supermarine	71	(17)
2020–2022	Yate Town	18	(1)
2022–2023	Cinderford Town	13	(0)
2025	Newent Town	4	(2)

International career
	Wales U17	10	(0)
2004–2006	Wales U21	5	(0)

Managerial career
- 2023–2025: Swindon Supermarine
- 2025–2026: Melksham Town
- * Club domestic league appearances and goals as of 7 August 2025 (UTC)

Stuart Keith Wakley Fleetwood (born 23 April 1986) is an English football manager and former professional footballer who played as a forward.

== Early life ==
Fleetwood was born in Gloucester, Gloucestershire. As a youngster Fleetwood was a talented rugby union fly-half and was part of the Newent team that won the Gloucester Schools Cup. However he eventually decided that football was the better route after he scored 104 goals in one season for Newent youth. He qualifies to play for Wales due to his father Keith, who was born in St Mellons, Cardiff.

== Club career ==
=== Cardiff City ===
Fleetwood started his career at Cardiff City at the age of 12 when he joined the club's youth programme, and eventually made one first team appearance in two and a half seasons as a professional. On 3 October 2005 Fleetwood was involved in a car accident on his way back from a Cardiff reserve match against Hereford United along with fellow players Nicky Fish, Lloyd Jenkins and Anthony Taylor. The accident occurred on the A40 in Monmouth and all four players had to be cut out of the wreckage of their Vauxhall Corsa after being hit by an articulated lorry. He was later released with minor injuries. He fell out of favour with the club during the 2005–06 season and was placed on the transfer list by the club. Fleetwood was still suffering the psychological effects of his car crash earlier in the season and he was arrested near Ninian Park for drink-driving where he was found to have more than double the legal limit of alcohol in his blood; he was banned from driving for twenty months and fined £455.

=== Hereford United ===
He signed for Hereford United in January 2006, who beat off competition from Hamilton Academical, and made a good start, scoring four goals in five league games. He featured as a substitute in the Conference play-off final win over Halifax Town, and subsequently signed a new one-year contract.

He made a promising start to the season by scoring Hereford's first Football League goal since 1997 and a further goal against Chester. In the League Cup he scored a hat-trick against Championship side Coventry City, becoming the first Hereford player to score a hat-trick in a League Cup tie. He was also called up to the Wales U21s. However his form escaped him after missing several matches due to contracting a virus, which caused him to lose nearly a stone in weight. On 31 January 2007 he was sent out on a month's loan to fellow League Two club Accrington Stanley. He made just three first team appearances after the turn of the year for the Bulls, and was released at the end of the season.

=== Forest Green Rovers ===
In June 2007 Fleetwood signed a one-year deal at Conference side Forest Green Rovers. He started the season in good form for Forest Green and started to attract interest from league scouts after just three months but he quickly moved to quash speculation by saying that he would be happy to see out his contract at the Gloucestershire club. His good form continued to be recognised when he was named as Conference Player of the month for September. In November and December he was a major factor in Forest Green causing an FA Cup upset when they knocked out Football League Two side Rotherham United. The first tie finished 2–2 with Fleetwood scoring both goals before the club won the replay 3–0 with Fleetwood again on the score sheet with one goal. He then found the net once in the following round in a 3–2 defeat at the hands of Football League One side Swindon Town.

Fleetwood's form saw him linked with, among others, Championship sides Charlton Athletic and Crystal Palace. League One clubs Cheltenham Town and Gillingham tabled bids for him in December. This was soon followed up with a reported £200,000 offer from Charlton Athletic On 20 January Forest Green Rovers announced that they had reached a financial agreement with Crewe Alexandra and had allowed Fleetwood to enter into talks with the League One side. However, Fleetwood rejected the chance of a move and stated "I can honestly state that even if any other clubs come in with a late bid before the transfer window closes, I am not interested." He ultimately scored 28 goals in 41 league appearances in the 2007–08 season as the club finished in their highest ever league placing. He was offered a new contract at the end of the season, but decided to leave.

=== Charlton Athletic ===
He joined Charlton Athletic on a three-year deal in June 2008. On 26 September 2008 he joined Football League One side Cheltenham Town on a one-month loan deal. He joined Cheltenham despite confessing to being a lifelong Gloucester City AFC supporter, Cheltenham's biggest rivals. He managed two league goals in his spell at Cheltenham, one coming in a 4–3 victory over Colchester and the other in a 2–2 draw with Stockport.

On 30 October 2008 Fleetwood agreed to join League One side Brighton & Hove Albion on loan, initially for one-month. He made his Brighton debut against the 4–1 win over Millwall on 1 November where he came on as a substitute in the 89th minute. He returned to Charlton on 30 January 2009 having scored 2 goals in 11 league appearances.

On 18 March 2009, Fleetwood signed on loan to Football League Two side Exeter City until the end of the 2008–09 season, where he impressed, scoring three goals in eight appearances.

Following promotion to League one, Exeter City made an undisclosed offer to Charlton Athletic for Stuart Fleetwood. Rumours were that a deal was about to go through, however, the new consortium at Charlton banned all transfers, and so the deal was halted. Fleetwood made his long-awaited debut for Charlton Athletic away to Hereford United in the 2009-10 Football League Cup First Round, entering the field of play in the 82nd minute. It was his only appearance for the Addicks.

On 1 September 2009 on transfer deadline day, Fleetwood returned to Exeter City on a season-long loan deal.

=== Hereford United ===
On 2 July 2010 it was announced that Fleetwood had re-joined Hereford United on a two-year contract for an undisclosed fee. He finished the season as the Bulls top scorer with 18 goals, helping the club to survive relegation from the Football League.

On 16 May 2011 Fleetwood met with the chairman of local Herefordshire outfit Woolhope Allstars, who play their football in league 2 of the Herefordshire Sunday League. Fleetwood has taken on an assistant manager post but will continue to play professional football.

=== Luton Town ===
Conference Premier side Luton Town completed the signing of Fleetwood from Hereford on 31 August 2011. He signed a two-year contract after the two clubs agreed an undisclosed fee. He made his debut on 2 September as a substitute in a 1–1 draw with Stockport County, hitting the post in the final minute. The next week he made his full debut at home to Darlington; Luton won the game 2–0 with Fleetwood scoring one and setting up Danny Crow for the other.

Fleetwood began to struggle to score on a regular basis in the league, but when Luton manager Gary Brabin gave him an extended run in the FA Trophy, he struck three times in four matches, including scoring the winner against Kidderminster Harriers in the Third Round. Brabin compared Fleetwood to former French international winger Robert Pires, citing the time it took for Pires to adapt to the league before turning into a consistent player. As the season progressed, Fleetwood gradually began to be used as an impact substitute by Brabin, or played out of position on the wing. After a seven-game winless run for Luton resulted in Brabin's sacking, new manager Paul Buckle began to play Fleetwood regularly as a striker, which saw him score five goals in Buckle's first seven games in charge. He played in Luton's 2–1 play-off final loss to York City, being substituted after an hour. He ended the 2011–12 season as Luton's top scorer with 16 goals in all competitions from 31 starts.

Fleetwood began the 2012–13 season under Buckle in similar goalscoring form, scoring in consecutive games with the equalising goal in a 2–2 draw against Gateshead, both strikes in Luton's 2–0 win against Kidderminster Harriers, and the winning goal in a 2–1 victory over Hyde. He went on to score seven further goals during the season, but was dropped following a change in management as Buckle was replaced by John Still. On 28 March 2013, Still confirmed that Fleetwood would be released at the end of the season.

=== Eastleigh ===
Fleetwood signed a one-year contract with Conference South club Eastleigh on 18 July 2013.

On 4 January 2015, it was announced that he had re-joined Forest Green Rovers on a loan deal until the end of the 2014–15 season. He made his second debut for Forest Green as a substitute in a 4–1 win over Welling United later that day. His first start came when he partnered Jon Parkin in attack in a 2–1 away win over Braintree Town on 17 January 2015.

He helped Forest Green to the Conference National play-offs however, after making 17 appearances for the club, his departure was confirmed on 4 May 2015.

=== Sutton United ===
On 17 June 2015, it was announced that Fleetwood had signed a two-year deal at Sutton United. He scored his only goal for the club on 9 February 2016 in an FA Trophy extra time replay defeat against Bognor Regis Town. In April 2016, it was confirmed that he had left the club after making 36 appearances in all competitions. Later that month, he admitted that he would consider joining new phoenix club Hereford.

=== Bath City ===
On 7 June 2016, Fleetwood was announced as a new signing for Bath City.

=== Merthyr Town ===
On 19 May 2017, Fleetwood signed for Southern Football League side Merthyr Town.

=== Redditch United ===
On 20 November 2017, Fleetwood joined fellow Southern Football League side Redditch United.

=== Swindon Supermarine ===
In July 2018, Fleetwood signed for Swindon Supermarine.

=== Yate Town ===
On 9 July 2020, Fleetwood joined Yate Town.

=== Cinderford Town ===
On 4 November 2022, Fleetwood signed for Cinderford Town.

=== Newent Town ===
In August 2025, Fleetwood returned to playing, joining Hellenic League Division One club Newent Town.

== International career ==
Fleetwood has won several caps for the Wales under-21 side, making his debut in 2004 against Latvia U21. His last call up was at Hereford although manager Graham Turner criticised the Welsh FA over the handling of the call up as Hereford did not find out he would be playing for the under-21 side until Fleetwood was already travelling to join the squad and was therefore unavailable for their clash with Rochdale. He has also played for Wales at various other youth levels.

On 30 October 2007, he was called up to the Wales semi-professional under-23 squad to face Italy in the European challenge trophy.

== Managerial career ==
Fleetwood initially joined Gloucester City as the club's Head of Academy in March 2023, before additionally taking on the role of first team coach later that year. After the departure of Gloucester manager Tim Flowers and his assistant Yan Klukowski in September 2023, Fleetwood left to become manager of Southern League Premier Division South club Swindon Supermarine in his first managerial role.

On 13 November 2025, Fleetwood was appointed manager of Melksham Town.

On 5 March 2026, Fleetwood departed the club.
