= 2010–11 Luton Town F.C. season =

English football club season

Luton Town
2010–11 season
- Chairman: Nick Owen
- Manager: Richard Money (until 28 March 2011); Gary Brabin (from 28 March 2011)
- Conference Premier: 3rd (play-off finalists)
- FA Cup: Second round
- FA Trophy: Semi-final
- Top goalscorer: League: Matthew Barnes-Homer (16); All: Matthew Barnes-Homer (19)
- Highest home attendance: 9,078 vs Wrexham (Conference Premier play-off semi-final, 10 May 2011)
- Lowest home attendance: 1,639 vs Welling United (FA Trophy First Round, 12 December 2010)
- Average home league attendance: 5,732
Home colours	Away colours	Third colours

The 2010–11 season was the 125th season in the history of Luton Town Football Club.

The club finished the season in third place, 21 points behind runaway league winners Crawley Town and 6 points behind second placed AFC Wimbledon. This meant Luton would contest promotion to The Football League through the play-offs for the second consecutive year. A 5–1 aggregate win over Wrexham in the play-off semi-final set up a final at the City of Manchester Stadium against AFC Wimbledon. The two clubs drew 0–0 after extra time to force a penalty shootout, which Luton lost 4–3.

Luton also missed out on the chance of a Wembley final and potential silverware, losing to Mansfield Town in the FA Trophy semi-finals.

Manager Richard Money, who had experienced a tempestuous relationship with Luton fans, left the club by mutual consent on 28 March 2011 following a 2–1 loss to relegation-threatened Southport. He was replaced by assistant manager Gary Brabin.

This article covers the period from 1 July 2010 to 30 June 2011.

== Background ==
A 30-point deduction imposed upon Luton Town for financial irregularities effectively crippled their chances of escaping relegation from The Football League in the 2008–09 season. As a result, the club played the next season in a division outside The Football League for the first time in 89 years. Their campaign in the Conference Premier ended in dashed hopes – Luton were favourites for promotion at the start of the year and, although the club rarely ventured any lower than the play-off positions for the entire duration of the season, it required a change in management for the club to begin actively challenging for the title. Richard Money replaced Mick Harford in October 2009, eventually leading the club on a winning run of games throughout the final third of the season that almost saw them topple ultimate victors Stevenage. In the end, the club had to settle for second place in the league, and faced fifth-placed side York City in the play-off semi-final. Luton lost both legs of the semi-final 1–0, consigning them to another year in non-League football.

The end of the previous season had seen Luton sign three players on free transfers; Cambridge United top scorer Danny Crow and teammate Dan Gleeson joined, as well as Notts County goalkeeper and former Luton loanee Kevin Pilkington.

== Review ==
=== July ===
Stevenage winger Andy Drury joined the club on 1 July on a free transfer, after an agreement to sign the player was reached towards the end of May.

Assistant manager Gary Brabin confirmed on 2 July that Kenyan striker Taiwo Atieno had not been retained by the club.

On 6 July, former Oxford United captain Adam Murray joined Luton on a two-year contract after his release.

Home friendlies were arranged against Premier League teams Liverpool and Newcastle United, while Scottish Premier League side Kilmarnock were also scheduled to visit Kenilworth Road. A friendly game against Marlow was arranged to mark the 125th anniversary of Luton Town; Marlow being Luton's first ever opponents in the year of the club's formation in 1885. Luton won the game 3–1, and commemorated the occasion by wearing the blue and pink club colours used in 1885.

Three trialists, midfielders Stefan Bailey and Ciarán Toner, and Hungarian goalkeeper Matyas Estherhazy, joined Luton for pre-season training. All played in a 5–1 victory over near-neighbours Hitchin Town on 15 July.

On 16 July, it was announced that defender Lewis Emanuel had not joined the club for pre-season training and had subsequently been released after four seasons as a Luton player.

Dan Walker and Zdeněk Kroča, two further trialists, joined Luton for the latter stages of pre-season. Kroča scored the winning goal in a 1–0 friendly victory over Kilmarnock, while Walker, who had previously been playing for Bedford Town, impressed enough to be offered a one-year contract. He signed for the club on 31 July.

=== August ===
Following a second impressive appearance in a 4–1 victory over a Newcastle United XI, Czech defender Kroča signed a one-year contract. His fellow countryman, defensive midfielder Pavel Besta, also played in the game. Manager Richard Money confirmed that he was finalising a deal to sign Besta and, on 6 August, he too signed a one-year contract.

Luton began the season on 14 August with a 2–1 win against Altrincham. Kroča scored on his competitive debut to give Luton the lead, and Matthew Barnes-Homer grabbed the winner in the 88th minute after Altrincham pulled a goal back midway through the second half.

Barnes-Homer scored a hat-trick in a 3–1 away victory over Kettering Town on 17 August. He scored two penalties as Kettering finished the match with nine men. Four days later Luton secured a third consecutive victory over Fleetwood Town.

The club's 100% record was ended with a 1–1 home draw against newly promoted Newport County on 24 August in a game that saw Keith Keane sent off late on. However, results elsewhere meant Luton remained top of the table with 10 points from their opening four matches.

On 27 August, it was confirmed that midfielder Kevin Nicholls had left the club by "respectful, mutual consent", after volunteering to be released from his contract. He had been recovering from knee surgery, and stated that he did not want to drain the club's resources while not contributing on the pitch. The same day, veteran defender Alan White left the club by mutual consent. White had not played a game for Luton since December 2009.

Tamworth inflicted Luton's first defeat of the season on 28 August with a 3–1 victory at The Lamb Ground, and two days later Luton drew 1–1 at home with Hayes & Yeading United. This result left the club in fourth place in the table at the end of the month, two points behind leaders Mansfield Town.

On 31 August Tom Craddock, Luton's top scorer the previous season, signed for League Two side Oxford United for an undisclosed fee.

=== September ===
On 2 September, striker Taiwo Atieno, who had been released from Luton in July and had subsequently been training with South African champions Supersport United, re-signed for the club on a contract until January 2011.

Grimsby Town inflicted Luton's second defeat of the season on 4 September, leaving the club searching for their first win in four games. This was soon achieved in the next game, with a 2–0 home victory against Cambridge United.

On 15 September, youth team midfielders Taylor Nathaniel and Adam Watkins, who had made their debuts for Luton the previous season, were sent on loan to Southern Football League Division One Central sides Barton Rovers and Arlesey Town, respectively.

On 17 September, Luton beat league leaders AFC Wimbledon 3–0 with goals from George Pilkington, Zdeněk Kroča and Matthew Barnes-Homer. Young striker Dan Walker also made his debut for the club. Four days later, Luton came from behind to secure a 2–2 draw with recently relegated Darlington; Claude Gnakpa and Jake Howells scoring the Hatters' goals. Luton faced another trip to North East England four days later to face Gateshead, in a game they lost 1–0 and had striker Taiwo Atieno sent off in the first half. Atieno's red card was later rescinded by the Football Association.

The club signed 21-year-old striker Amari Morgan-Smith on a free transfer on 28 September. Morgan-Smith was out of contract having previously been released from Ilkeston Town when the club went out of business earlier in September. He scored on his Luton debut the same day as they won 2–0 against Mansfield Town. Danny Crow also scored his first goal for the club in a game that saw Luton miss three penalties.

=== October ===
Summer signing Adam Murray signed for Mansfield Town on a three-month loan on 1 October, with a view to a permanent transfer on 1 January 2011.

Luton won their first away game since mid-August a day later with a 1–0 victory over Barrow. A 2–1 home loss to league leaders Crawley Town on 5 October left Luton eight points behind them. An Andy Drury penalty had given Luton the lead midway through the second half, though Crawley hit back in the closing stages to snatch a win, with Craig McAllister eventually scoring the winner two minutes into added time.

An 11-day break without a game ended on 16 October with a 4–2 victory at Eastbourne Borough, Danny Crow scoring two goals. Three days later, Luton recorded their biggest win of the season so far with a 6–1 home victory over Forest Green Rovers. Crow continued his recent scoring run with two further goals, while Barnes-Homer netted his ninth of the season. The game also saw young striker Dan Walker score his first goal for the club with a 25-yard strike.

On 22 October, striker Kevin Gallen, who had not played for Luton since the beginning of September, signed for League Two club Barnet on loan until 8 January 2011.

Luton's goalscoring continued on 23 October with a 4–0 victory in the FA Cup 4th qualifying round against Conference South side St Albans City. Amari Morgan-Smith scored a hat-trick, with Danny Crow scoring once again.

Goalkeeper Kevin Pilkington joined his former club Mansfield Town on loan for three months on 28 October.

Luton celebrated their 125th anniversary on 30 October with a 3–1 victory over struggling Bath City. Goals from Danny Crow, George Pilkington and a first Luton goal from Taiwo Atieno lifted Luton to third in the table, three points behind Crawley Town.

=== November ===
On 5 November, young duo Dan Walker and Godfrey Poku signed contract extensions until June 2012. Youth team defender Alex Lacey also signed his first professional contract with the club the same day.

Luton drew 1–1 with Conference North side Corby Town in the FA Cup first round on 6 November. The result meant the two teams would play a replay at Kenilworth Road on 17 November.

York City and former Wales under-21 international midfielder Alex Lawless joined Luton on 8 November. Lawless initially joined on loan, with a permanent transfer taking place in January 2011.

A 1–0 loss to Wrexham on 11 November was swiftly followed up two days later with a 1–0 win over Altrincham. This game saw Lawless score his first goal for the club.

Barrow striker Jason Walker signed for Luton on 17 November on a similar deal to Alex Lawless – a loan deal until January 2011, in which the transfer would then become permanent. Walker had scored 45 league goals for Barrow over the course of four seasons, including the winning goal in the club's FA Trophy victory the previous season.

17 November also saw Luton play their FA Cup replay against Corby Town – the game ended in a 4–2 victory to the Hatters, with Matthew Barnes-Homer, Taiwo Atieno and Claude Gnakpa scoring the goals. This win set up a Second Round tie away to League One side Charlton Athletic.

Luton's run of four games in ten days ended in a 5–1 win at home to struggling Histon on 20 November. Jason Walker scored a debut goal as the club moved to one point behind league leaders Crawley Town in the table.

On 25 November 19-year-old midfielder Jake Howells signed a new two-year contract with the club.

The day of the loan transfer deadline, 26 November, saw Luton make two further signings to bolster their squad. Northampton Town defender Craig Hinton was drafted in on loan until 4 January 2011 as cover for the injured Shane Blackett, while 24-year-old Newport County winger Charlie Henry was signed on an initial loan with a permanent transfer arranged for January 2011. Henry had previously been part of the Luton youth set-up as a 15-year-old.

A day later, Luton drew 2–2 with Charlton Athletic in the FA Cup; a team 49 places above them in the league hierarchy. Two goals from midfielder Andy Drury ensured a replay at Kenilworth Road on 9 December.

A top-of-the-table clash against AFC Wimbledon had to be postponed on 30 November due to a frozen pitch at Kingsmeadow.

=== December ===
The severe winter weather continued from November, resulting in Luton's next league game against Forest Green Rovers on 4 December also being postponed.

On 8 December, it was announced that defender Fred Murray was to be out of action for up to four weeks due to a hernia operation, adding to the injuries to fellow defenders Shane Blackett and long-term victim Adam Newton.

Luton fell to a 3–1 home defeat to Charlton Athletic on 9 December, putting them out of the FA Cup. Zdeněk Kroča opened the scoring in the first half, but goals from Scott Wagstaff, Joe Anyinsah and Johnnie Jackson saw Charlton progress. Injuries continued to mount as it was announced Danny Crow had injured his ankle and Amari Morgan-Smith had fractured his cheekbone during the game.

An FA Trophy First Round tie against Welling United on 12 December finished in a 0–0 draw, with a youthful Luton side having to travel to Park View Road on 14 December for a replay. Luton won the replay 2–1 in a game that resulted in the lowest ever crowd for a competitive match featuring the club; 404 fans were in attendance at Welling, beating the previous low of 469 set at Thames on 6 December 1930. Youth team players Cauley Woodrow and Newman Carney made their Luton debuts during the victory.

A midday kick-off against York City on 18 December was abandoned after 55 minutes with the score at 0–0 due to heavy snow.

The traditional footballing Christmas period was also hit by the weather; Luton's Boxing Day game at Rushden & Diamonds and home game on 28 December against Tamworth were both postponed due to frozen pitches. This meant the club had not played a single league game since 20 November, leaving them with a total of six games to re-arrange for the New Year. This left Luton in fourth place in the table at the end of December, albeit with up to three games more to play than their rivals.

Young striker Dan Walker was sent on a one-month loan to divisional rivals Eastbourne Borough on 31 December.

=== January ===
Luton started 2011 with a 3–0 home win over Rushden & Diamonds on New Year's Day. Matthew Barnes-Homer scored his twelfth and thirteenth goals of the season, with Claude Gnakpa adding the final goal in what was the club's first league game in 42 days. Three days later, Gnakpa scored the only goal of the game in a 1–0 away win against Hayes & Yeading United.

The loan transfers of Charlie Henry, Alex Lawless and Jason Walker all became permanent on 4 January, while on-loan defender Craig Hinton returned to Northampton Town after playing in just two FA Trophy games. Midfielder Adam Murray completed his permanent transfer to Mansfield Town the same day.

Luton drew 0–0 with Bath City on 8 January, and followed this result up with another goalless draw away to league leaders AFC Wimbledon four days later. These two results saw the club move into second place in the league.

Luton progressed into the third round of the FA Trophy with a 4–0 victory over Uxbridge on 15 January. Taiwo Atieno and youth team product Adam Watkins scored two goals apiece which set up another home tie against Conference North side Gloucester City in early February. Youth team players Christian Tavernier and Alasan Ann also made their Luton debuts during the game.

On 18 January, Luton signed out-of-contract 34-year-old Ghanaian striker Lloyd Owusu on a deal running until May 2011. Owusu scored on his debut on the same day as Luton secured a comprehensive 5–0 win over York City. York had goalkeeper Michael Ingham sent off early in the first half, which saw Andy Drury open the scoring from the resulting free-kick. Goals from Claude Gnakpa, Zdeněk Kroča and Taiwo Atieno followed, as York had Jonathan Smith also shown a red card late on.

Injury problems began to mount at the club; winger Charlie Henry, who had yet to play a game for Luton, was ruled out for the rest of the season with a foot ligament problem. Amari Morgan-Smith and Jason Walker suffered ankle and hamstring injuries respectively, defender Dan Gleeson picked up an ankle injury in the game against York City, and long-term defensive absentees Fred Murray, Shane Blackett and Adam Newton were still no closer to full fitness.

On 22 January, Luton drew 2–2 at home with Gateshead. Gateshead took a 2–0 lead early in the first half before goals from Danny Crow and Claude Gnakpa put the clubs back on level footing, though Gateshead played the second half with only 10 men after Ben Clark was sent off.

Three days later, Gnakpa scored his eighth goal of the season as Luton emerged as 1–0 victors in a close game with Grimsby Town. This meant the club ended January in third place in the league having gone through the month unbeaten.

Twenty-year-old Cambridge United winger Robbie Willmott signed for Luton for £50,000 on an 18-month contract on 28 January.

On 31 January, transfer deadline day, midfielder Andy Drury was bought by Championship side Ipswich Town for £150,000. Drury had scored 8 goals in his 26 games for Luton. Striker Taiwo Atieno and midfielder Pavel Besta were released from the club the same day. Both had found regular first-team places difficult to hold down, making only 17 starts between them. Later that day, Kevin Gallen and youth-team graduate Taylor Nathaniel were also both released. Half an hour before the transfer window shut, Luton confirmed the loan signing of defender Luke Graham from Kettering Town until the end of the season.

=== February ===
Four goals in the last twenty minutes from Claude Gnakpa, Alex Lawless and two from Lloyd Owusu secured a 4–0 home victory over Darlington on 1 February. Robbie Willmott and Luke Graham made their debuts as substitutes during the match.

Graham scored the winning goal on his full debut, a 1–0 victory over Gloucester City on 4 February, that put Luton into the quarter-final of the FA Trophy.

Luton were defeated for the first time in 11 league games as Fleetwood Town beat them 3–1 at Kenilworth Road on 12 February.

On 18 February, with the loan transfer window opened, Cambridge United midfielder Paul Carden signed for Luton on loan until the end of the season. Young striker Dan Walker went in the opposite direction, signing for Cambridge on a one-month loan. The same day, Carden made his debut in a 1–1 draw with Newport County. Luton took the lead in the first-half through Willmott, but were pegged back via a last-minute Newport penalty.

Luton beat Guiseley 1–0 on 26 February to earn a place in the FA Trophy semi-final, Matthew Barnes-Homer scoring the winner.

=== March ===
On 1 March a goal from Lloyd Owusu gave Luton a 1–0 away win against Forest Green Rovers. Four days later, Luton drew 1–1 at home to in-form Kidderminster Harriers. This was then followed up three days later with a 2–0 victory over Tamworth.

On 13 March, Luton lost the first leg of the FA Trophy semi-final 1–0 at Mansfield Town.

Two days later, Luton drew 0–0 away to Cambridge United in the league.

On 19 March, Luton were knocked out of the FA Trophy after a 1–1 draw at home to Mansfield. Alex Lawless and Claude Gnakpa were sent off during the game.

With the league now their priority, Luton secured a 1–0 away win over Rushden & Diamonds on 22 March, Robbie Willmott scoring the only goal.

On 25 March, defender Ed Asafu-Adjaye joined Histon on loan until the end of the season. Later that day, 16-year-old striker Cauley Woodrow, who had made three Luton appearances, was signed by Premier League side Fulham for an undisclosed six-figure fee.

Luton lost 2–1 to relegation-threatened Southport on 26 March, producing a result and performance that caused manager Richard Money to apologise to the fans.

The result, and run of form that had seen Luton slip to 15 points behind leaders Crawley Town, led to Money being replaced as manager by his assistant Gary Brabin on 28 March.

Brabin's first game in charge, on 29 March, ended in a 0–0 home draw against Barrow.

=== April ===
Luton drew 3–3 with Kidderminster Harriers on 2 April in an attacking display of football, marking the first time in over two months, and over the course of 13 games, that the club had scored more than two goals in a match. Robbie Willmott, Claude Gnakpa and Jason Walker were on the scoresheet. A third consecutive draw followed on 5 April, the club drawing 2–2 with Kettering Town with Jake Howells and Amari Morgan-Smith scoring the goals.

Luton claimed their first win under Gary Brabin's management with a 6–0 home victory over Southport. Luton were forced to settle for, at most, a play-off place, as a win for league leaders Crawley Town the same afternoon meant they claimed the Conference Premier title with five games left of the season.

Crawley then hosted Luton three days later, resulting in a 1–1 draw. Another draw followed on 16 April, with Luton gaining a point from a 0–0 stalemate at Mansfield Town.

Luton lost their first game under Brabin's tenure on 19 April, losing 1–0 away to York City. This left the club needing just one point from their remaining 3 games to secure a place in the play-offs. This was duly achieved on 23 April, as a dominant 3–0 win over already-relegated Eastbourne Borough cemented their play-off place.

The goals continued to flow, as a 4–0 victory over Histon on 25 April guaranteed Luton would play fourth-placed Wrexham in the play-off semi-finals. The game saw goals from Matthew Barnes-Homer, his 18th and 19th of the season, Amari Morgan-Smith and Claude Gnakpa. Coincidentally, the final league game of the season on 30 April was also against Wrexham, which ended in a 1–1 draw.

=== May ===
The first leg of the play-off semi-final on 5 May was won by Luton in emphatic fashion as they registered a 3–0 away victory against Wrexham. All goals came during a 20-minute barrage in the first half, beginning with a 25-yard strike from Alex Lawless, then a powerful rising shot into the top-corner from Claude Gnakpa, finished by an 18-yard half-volley from defender Ed Asafu-Adjaye, his first senior goal for the club.

The club sealed their place in the play-off final with a 2–1 home win in the second leg on 10 May. Wrexham scored first, dominating the opening of the game, with Luton indebted to Mark Tyler for not going further behind by saving a penalty. However, Luton hit back with goals from Zdeněk Kroča and Jason Walker to register a 5–1 aggregate win.

Luton's opponents for the play-off final at the City of Manchester Stadium on 21 May were AFC Wimbledon. A tight game, which saw both clubs hit the post, saw the clubs play a goalless draw into extra time. No goals in this period led to a penalty shootout, which Wimbledon emerged victorious from with a 4–3 shootout win after penalty misses from Alex Lawless and Jason Walker. This meant Luton would contest a third successive non-League season in 2011–12.

Gary Brabin, contracted as manager only until the end of the season, received the full support from the Luton board despite the defeat and, on 27 May, he signed a two-year contract to continue as permanent manager.

=== June ===
On 2 June, it was announced that utility player Adam Newton and striker Lloyd Owusu had been released by the club after not being offered new contracts.

Luton made their first signing of the close season on 6 June, picking up Rushden & Diamonds striker Aaron O'Connor on a free transfer.

On 10 June, the club secured goalkeepers Mark Tyler and Kevin Pilkington to one-year contract extensions.

Former Northampton Town defender Dean Beckwith signed for Luton on a free transfer on 14 June.

Luton striker Jason Walker, who had missed a penalty in the shoot-out against AFC Wimbledon in the previous month, was sold to York City on 20 June for a fee of £60,000. Walker had indicated that he and his family had found it hard to settle in Bedfordshire, and would prefer a move to the North of England.

Later that week, Luton tied defenders Shane Blackett and Jonathan O'Donnell to one-year contract extensions.

On 30 June, the last day of the season, central defender Zdeněk Kroča signed for Scottish Premier League side Kilmarnock on a free transfer following the expiration of his contract.

== Match results ==
Luton Town results given first.

=== Legend ===
Win	Draw	Loss

=== Pre-season friendlies ===
Date	Opponent	Venue	Result	Attendance	Scorers	Notes
14 July 2010	Dunstable Town	Away	2–2	756	Watkins, Patrick	Luton XI
15 July 2010	Hitchin Town	Away	5–1	878	Crow, Newton, Drury, Bailey, Gallen	
17 July 2010	Bedford Town	Away	1–0	845	Crow	
20 July 2010	Cambridge City	Away	1–1	309	Barnes-Homer	
22 July 2010	Marlow	Away	3–1	252	Howells, Gallen, Keane	
24 July 2010	Alfreton Town	Away	0–3	392	–	
27 July 2010	Liverpool XI	Home	3–0	2,769	Barnes-Homer, Crow, Gleeson	
30 July 2010	Kilmarnock	Home	1–0	1,428	Kroča	
4 August 2010	Newcastle United XI	Home	4–1	2,036	Barnes-Homer (2), Crow, Newton	
5 August 2010	Brackley Town	Away	1–1	–	Craddock	Luton XI
7 August 2010	Woking	Away	2–1	618	Gallen, A. Murray	
10 August 2010	Arlesey Town	Away	3–1	258	Gnakpa, D. Walker, Watkins	Luton XI; Bedfordshire Premier Cup Final

=== Conference Premier ===
Pos	Team	Pld	W	D	L	GF	GA	GD	Pts	Promotion, qualification or relegation
1	Crawley Town (C, P)	46	31	12	3	93	30	+63	105	Promotion to Football League Two
2	AFC Wimbledon (O, P)	46	27	9	10	83	47	+36	90	Qualification for the Conference Premier play-offs
3	Luton Town	46	23	15	8	85	37	+48	84	Qualification for the Conference Premier play-offs
4	Wrexham	46	22	15	9	66	49	+17	81	Qualification for the Conference Premier play-offs
5	Fleetwood Town	46	22	12	12	68	42	+26	78	Qualification for the Conference Premier play-offs

Source: Football Conference
Rules for classification: 1) points; 2) goal difference; 3) number of goals scored.
(C) Champions; (O) Play-off winners; (P) Promoted

Date	Opponent	Venue	Result	Attendance	Scorers	Notes
14 August 2010	Altrincham	Home	2–1	6,665	Kroča, Barnes-Homer	
17 August 2010	Kettering Town	Away	3–1	2,906	Barnes-Homer (3)	
21 August 2010	Fleetwood Town	Away	3–0	2,831	Barnes-Homer, Gnakpa, Craddock	
24 August 2010	Newport County	Home	1–1	6,945	Kroča	
28 August 2010	Tamworth	Away	1–3	1,694	Craddock	
30 August 2010	Hayes & Yeading United	Home	1–1	6,354	Drury	
4 September 2010	Grimsby Town	Away	0–2	3,822	–	
11 September 2010	Cambridge United	Home	2–0	6,691	Drury, G. Pilkington	
17 September 2010	AFC Wimbledon	Home	3–0	7,283	G. Pilkington, Kroča, Barnes-Homer	
21 September 2010	Darlington	Away	2–2	1,665	Gnakpa, Howells	
25 September 2010	Gateshead	Away	0–1	1,075	–	
28 September 2010	Mansfield Town	Home	2–0	6,024	Crow, Morgan-Smith	
2 October 2010	Barrow	Away	1–0	1,416	Barnes-Homer	
5 October 2010	Crawley Town	Home	1–2	6,895	Drury (pen)	
16 October 2010	Eastbourne Borough	Away	4–2	2,518	G. Pilkington, Barnes-Homer, Crow (2)	
19 October 2010	Forest Green Rovers	Home	6–1	5,704	Drury, Morgan-Smith, Crow (2), Barnes-Homer, D. Walker	
30 October 2010	Bath City	Home	3–1	7,003	Crow, G. Pilkington, Atieno	
11 November 2010	Wrexham	Away	0–1	2,733	–	
13 November 2010	Altrincham	Away	1–0	1,416	Lawless	
20 November 2010	Histon	Home	5–1	5,963	Gnakpa, Howells, J. Walker, Drury, Atieno	
1 January 2011	Rushden & Diamonds	Home	3–0	6,928	Barnes-Homer (2), Gnakpa	
4 January 2011	Hayes & Yeading United	Away	1–0	801	Gnakpa	
8 January 2011	Bath City	Away	0–0	2,301	–	
12 January 2011	AFC Wimbledon	Away	0–0	4,287	–	
18 January 2011	York City	Home	5–0	5,997	Drury, Gnakpa, Owusu, Kroča, Atieno	
22 January 2011	Gateshead	Home	2–2	5,958	Crow, Gnakpa	
25 January 2011	Grimsby Town	Home	1–0	5,609	Gnakpa	
1 February 2011	Darlington	Home	4–0	5,770	Gnakpa, Owusu (2), Lawless	
12 February 2011	Fleetwood Town	Home	1–3	6,227	Owusu	
18 February 2011	Newport County	Away	1–1	2,834	Willmott	
1 March 2011	Forest Green Rovers	Away	1–0	1,015	Owusu	
5 March 2011	Kidderminster Harriers	Home	1–1	6,108	Barnes-Homer	
8 March 2011	Tamworth	Home	2–0	5,737	Owusu, Barnes-Homer	
15 March 2011	Cambridge United	Away	0–0	2,831	–	
22 March 2011	Rushden & Diamonds	Away	1–0	2,459	Willmott	
26 March 2011	Southport	Away	1–2	1,695	Barnes-Homer	
29 March 2011	Barrow	Home	0–0	5,528	–	
2 April 2011	Kidderminster Harriers	Away	3–3	2,756	Willmott, Gnakpa, J. Walker	
5 April 2011	Kettering Town	Home	2–2	5,715	Howells, Morgan-Smith	
9 April 2011	Southport	Home	6–0	5,844	Morgan-Smith, Willmott, F. Murray, J. Walker, Kroča, Gnakpa	
12 April 2011	Crawley Town	Away	1–1	3,326	Lawless	
16 April 2011	Mansfield Town	Away	0–0	2,203	–	
19 April 2011	York City	Away	0–1	2,955	–	
23 April 2011	Eastbourne Borough	Home	3–0	6,171	Willmott (2), Gnakpa	
25 April 2011	Histon	Away	4–0	1,159	Morgan-Smith, Barnes-Homer (2), Gnakpa	
30 April 2011	Wrexham	Home	1–1	6,443	J. Walker (pen)	

==== Conference Premier play-offs ====
Round	Date	Opponent	Venue	Result	Attendance	Scorers	Notes
Semi-final First Leg	5 May 2011	Wrexham	Away	3–0	7,211	Lawless, Gnakpa, Asafu-Adjaye	
Semi-final Second Leg	10 May 2011	Wrexham	Home	2–1	9,078	Kroča, J. Walker	
Final	21 May 2011	AFC Wimbledon	Neutral	0–0	18,195	–	Luton lost 4–3 on pens

=== FA Cup ===
Round	Date	Opponent	Venue	Result	Attendance	Scorers	Notes
4th Qualifying Round	23 October 2010	St Albans City	Home	4–0	4,144	Morgan-Smith (3), Crow	
First round	6 November 2010	Corby Town	Away	1–1	2,000	Barnes-Homer	
First round replay	17 November 2010	Corby Town	Home	4–2	3,050	Barnes-Homer, Atieno (2), Gnakpa	
Second round	27 November 2010	Charlton Athletic	Away	2–2	8,682	Drury (2)	
Second round replay	9 December 2010	Charlton Athletic	Home	1–3	5,914	Kroča	

=== FA Trophy ===
Round	Date	Opponent	Venue	Result	Attendance	Scorers	Notes
First round	12 December 2010	Welling United	Home	0–0	1,639	–	
First round replay	14 December 2010	Welling United	Away	2–1	404	J. Walker, Lawless	
Second round	15 January 2011	Uxbridge	Home	4–0	1,958	Atieno (2), Watkins (2)	
Third round	4 February 2011	Gloucester City	Home	1–0	2,212	Graham	
Quarter-final	26 February 2011	Guiseley	Away	1–0	1,152	Barnes-Homer	
Semi-final First Leg	13 March 2011	Mansfield Town	Away	0–1	3,208	–	
Semi-final Second Leg	19 March 2011	Mansfield Town	Home	1–1	6,133	Owusu	

== Player statistics ==
Correct as of 24 May 2011. Numbers in parentheses indicate substitute appearances.

No.	Pos.	Name	League*		FA Cup		FA Trophy		Total		Discipline	
No.	Pos.	Name	Apps	Goals	Apps	Goals	Apps	Goals	Apps	Goals	Yellow card	Red card
1	GK	(England) Mark Tyler	46	0	5	0	3	0	54	0	0	0
2	DF	(England) Dan Gleeson	36 (1)	0	5	0	0	0	41 (1)	0	3	0
3	DF	(Republic of Ireland) Fred Murray	28	1	3	0	2	0	33	1	3	0
4	MF	(Republic of Ireland) Keith Keane	42	0	5	0	3	0	50	0	8	1
5	DF	(Wales) Luke Graham	6 (4)	0	0	0	4	1	10 (4)	1	2	0
5	DF	(England) Craig Hinton	0	0	0	0	2	0	2	0	0	0
6	DF	(England) George Pilkington	48	4	5	0	3	0	56	4	5	0
7	MF	(Saint Kitts and Nevis) Adam Newton	14 (7)	0	0	0	1	0	15 (7)	0	1	0
8	FW	(England) Amari Morgan-Smith	15 (5)	5	3	3	2 (2)	0	20 (7)	8	0	0
9	FW	(England) Matthew Barnes-Homer	39 (8)	16	5	2	3	1	47 (8)	19	6	0
10	FW	(Kenya) Taiwo Atieno	6 (7)	3	2 (2)	2	3	2	11 (9)	7	1	1
10	FW	(England) Tom Craddock	1 (3)	2	0	0	0	0	1 (3)	2	1	0
11	MF	(England) Andy Drury	23	6	3	2	0	0	26	8	4	1
11	MF	(England) Robbie Willmott	15 (3)	6	0	0	0	0	15 (3)	6	2	0
12	DF	(England) Shane Blackett	7 (1)	0	0	0	0	0	7 (1)	0	1	0
13	DF	(Czech Republic) Zdeněk Kroča	48	6	3	1	4	0	55	7	9	0
14	MF	(Wales) Alex Lawless	18 (5)	4	0	0	6	1	24 (5)	5	2	1
14	MF	(England) Adam Murray	6 (1)	0	0	0	0	0	6 (1)	0	2	0
15	MF	(England) Jake Howells	37 (8)	3	5	0	5	0	47 (8)	3	1	0
16	DF	(England) Ed Asafu-Adjaye	6 (2)	1	2 (1)	0	4	0	12 (3)	1	2	0
17	MF	(Czech Republic) Pavel Besta	3 (3)	0	0	0	3	0	6 (3)	0	0	0
17	MF	(England) Paul Carden	8 (2)	0	0	0	0	0	8 (2)	0	1	0
18	MF	(France) Claude Gnakpa	36 (9)	14	5	1	3 (1)	0	44 (10)	15	10	1
19	FW	(England) Danny Crow	17 (11)	7	3	1	1 (3)	0	21 (14)	8	5	0
20	FW	(England) Kevin Gallen	4 (2)	0	0	0	0	0	4 (2)	0	0	0
21	MF	(England) Charlie Henry	0	0	0	0	0	0	0	0	0	0
23	FW	(England) Jason Walker	11 (12)	5	0	0	5 (1)	1	16 (13)	6	2	0
24	DF	(England) Alex Lacey	0 (1)	0	0	0	3	0	3 (1)	0	0	0
25	MF	(England) Godfrey Poku	2 (7)	0	0 (4)	0	4 (2)	0	6 (13)	0	3	0
26	DF	(England) Jonathan O'Donnell	0	0	0 (1)	0	3 (1)	0	3 (2)	0	0	0
27	MF	(England) Taylor Nathaniel	0	0	0	0	0	0	0	0	0	0
28	MF	(England) Adam Watkins	0 (3)	0	0	0	1 (1)	2	1 (4)	2	0	0
29	FW	(England) Dan Walker	1 (11)	1	1 (3)	0	2 (1)	0	4 (15)	1	0	0
30	GK	(England) Kevin Pilkington	3	0	0	0	3	0	6	0	0	0
31	GK	(England) Lewis Kidd	0	0	0	0	0	0	0	0	0	0
32	FW	(England) Jordan Patrick	0	0	0	0	0 (1)	0	0 (1)	0	0	0
33	FW	(England) Cauley Woodrow	0	0	0	0	0 (3)	0	0 (3)	0	0	0
34	FW	(Ghana) Lloyd Owusu	13	6	0	0	2	1	15	7	1	0
35	MF	(England) Christian Tavernier	0	0	0	0	1	0	1	0	1	0
36	DF	(England) Newman Carney	0	0	0	0	0 (2)	0	0 (2)	0	0	0
37	MF	(England) Alasan Ann	0	0	0	0	0 (1)	0	0 (1)	0	0	0
38	DF	(England) Michael Cain	0	0	0	0	0	0	0	0	0	0

- *The league column also includes play-off matches.

== Managerial statistics ==
Only competitive games from the 2010–11 season are included.
Correct as of 24 May 2011.

Name	Nat.	From	To	Record								Honours
Name	Nat.	From	To	PLD	W	D	L	GF	GA	GD	W%	Honours
Richard Money	(England)	30 October 2009	28 March 2011	48	26	13	9	86	40	+46	54.2	–
Gary Brabin	(England)	28 March 2011	Present	13	5	7	1	25	9	+16	38.5	Play-off finalists
Total				61	31	20	10	111	49	+62	50.8	Play-off finalists

== Awards ==
Awarded on 1 May 2011.

Award	Name	No.	Pos.	Notes
Luton Town Supporters Club Player of the Year	(England) Mark Tyler	1	GK	
Players' Player of the Year	(England) George Pilkington	6	DF	
Young Player of the Year	(England) Jake Howells	15	MF	
Luton Town F.C. Website Player of the Year	(England) Mark Tyler	1	GK	
LTSC Junior Members' Player of the Year	(England) Matthew Barnes-Homer	9	FW	
Goal of the Season	(England) Dan Walker	29	FW	^{[A]}

== Transfers ==
=== In ===
Date	Player	From	Fee	Notes
1 July 2010	(England) Andy Drury	Stevenage	Free	
6 July 2010	(England) Adam Murray	Oxford United	Free	
31 July 2010	(England) Dan Walker	Bedford Town	Free	
5 August 2010	(Czech Republic) Zdeněk Kroča	Unattached		
6 August 2010	(Czech Republic) Pavel Besta	Unattached		
2 September 2010	(Kenya) Taiwo Atieno	Unattached		
28 September 2010	(England) Amari Morgan-Smith	Unattached		
4 January 2011	(England) Charlie Henry	Newport County	Undisclosed	
4 January 2011	(Wales) Alex Lawless	York City	Undisclosed	
4 January 2011	(England) Jason Walker	Barrow	Undisclosed	
18 January 2011	(Ghana) Lloyd Owusu	Unattached		
28 January 2011	(England) Robbie Willmott	Cambridge United	£50,000	
6 June 2011	(England) Aaron O'Connor	Rushden & Diamonds	Free	
14 June 2011	(England) Dean Beckwith	Northampton Town	Free	

=== Out ===
Date	Player	To	Fee	Notes
2 July 2010	(Kenya) Taiwo Atieno	Released		
16 July 2010	(Republic of Ireland) Lewis Emanuel	Released		
27 August 2010	(England) Kevin Nicholls	Retired		
27 August 2010	(England) Alan White	Stalybridge Celtic	Free	
31 August 2010	(England) Tom Craddock	Oxford United	Undisclosed	
4 January 2011	(England) Adam Murray	Mansfield Town	Undisclosed	
31 January 2011	(Kenya) Taiwo Atieno	Released		
31 January 2011	(Czech Republic) Pavel Besta	Released		
31 January 2011	(England) Andy Drury	Ipswich Town	£150,000	
31 January 2011	(England) Kevin Gallen	Released		
31 January 2011	(England) Taylor Nathaniel	Released		
26 March 2011	(England) Cauley Woodrow	Fulham	Undisclosed	
2 June 2011	(Saint Kitts and Nevis) Adam Newton	Released		
2 June 2011	(Ghana) Lloyd Owusu	Released		
20 June 2011	(England) Jason Walker	York City	£60,000	
30 June 2011	(Czech Republic) Zdeněk Kroča	Kilmarnock	Free	

=== Loans in ===
Date	Player	From	End date	Notes
8 November 2010	(Wales) Alex Lawless	York City	4 January 2011	
17 November 2010	(England) Jason Walker	Barrow	4 January 2011	
26 November 2010	(England) Charlie Henry	Newport County	4 January 2011	
26 November 2010	(England) Craig Hinton	Northampton Town	4 January 2011	
31 January 2011	(Wales) Luke Graham	Kettering Town	31 May 2011	
18 February 2011	(England) Paul Carden	Cambridge United	23 May 2011	

=== Loans out ===
Date	Player	To	End date	Notes
15 September 2010	(England) Taylor Nathaniel	Barton Rovers	15 October 2010	
15 September 2010	(England) Adam Watkins	Arlesey Town	15 October 2010	
1 October 2010	(England) Adam Murray	Mansfield Town	4 January 2011	
22 October 2010	(England) Kevin Gallen	Barnet	8 January 2011	
28 October 2010	(England) Kevin Pilkington	Mansfield Town	28 January 2011	
6 December 2010	(England) Adam Watkins	Arlesey Town	12 January 2011	
31 December 2010	(England) Dan Walker	Eastbourne Borough	31 January 2011	
18 February 2011	(England) Dan Walker	Cambridge United	21 March 2011	
11 March 2011	(England) Jonathan O'Donnell	St Albans City	11 April 2011	
11 March 2011	(England) Adam Watkins	Harrow Borough	11 April 2011	
25 March 2011	(England) Ed Asafu-Adjaye	Histon	20 April 2011	

== Footnotes ==
A. The goal of the season was chosen as Dan Walker's long-range strike on 19 October 2010 in a 6–1 victory against Forest Green Rovers.

== See also ==
- 2010–11 in English football
- 2010–11 Football Conference
