= 2009 Football League Trophy final =

2009 Football League Trophy Final
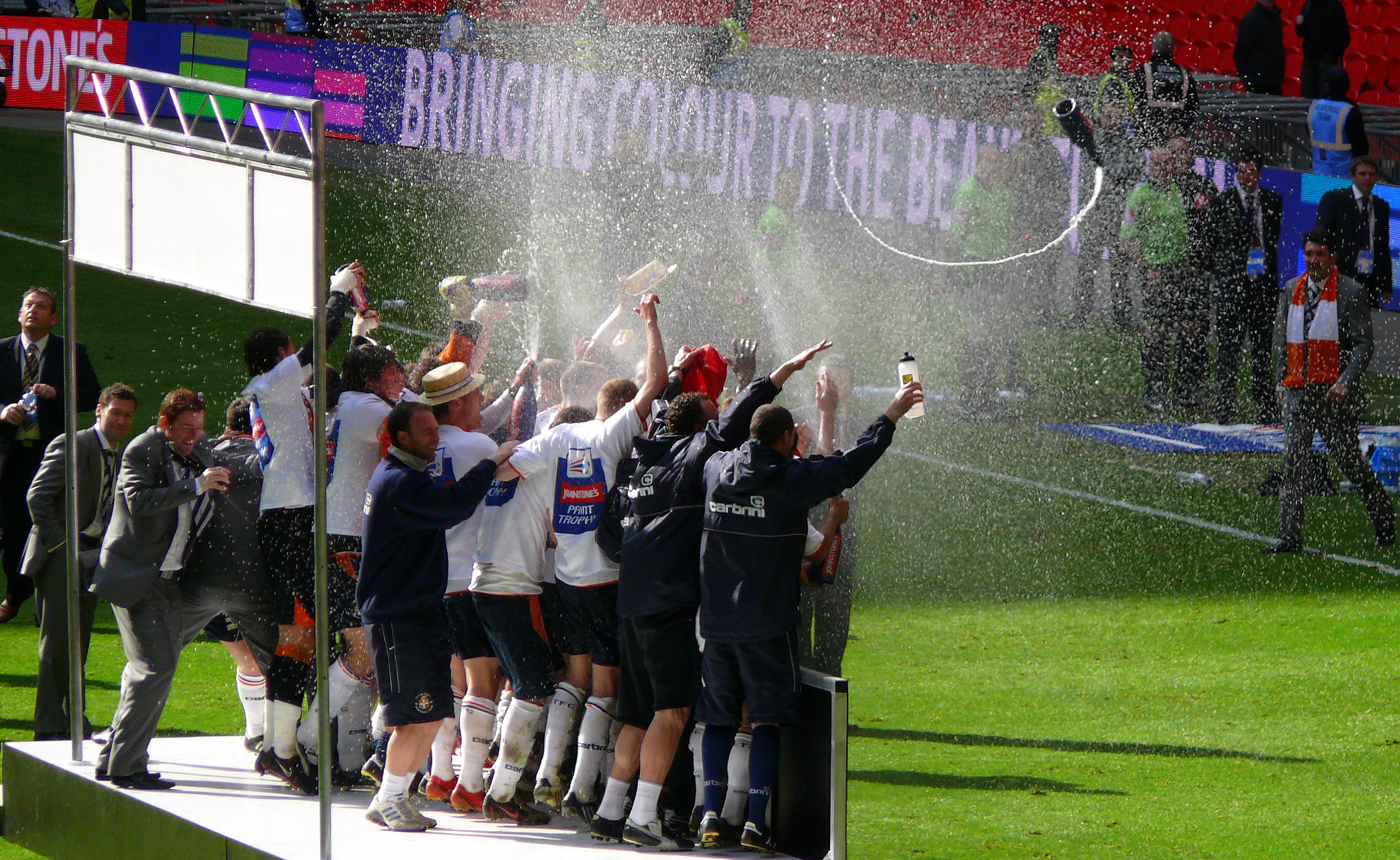
- Luton Town staff and players celebrate their victory
- Event: 2008–09 Football League Trophy
Luton Town	Scunthorpe United
3	2
- after extra time
- Date: 5 April 2009
- Venue: Wembley Stadium, London
- Man of the Match: Kevin Nicholls (Luton Town)
- Referee: Phil Crossley (Kent)
- Attendance: 55,378

The 2009 Football League Trophy Final was the 26th final of the domestic football cup competition for teams from Football Leagues One and Two, the Football League Trophy. The final was played at Wembley Stadium in London on 5 April 2009, the second time that the final had been staged at the stadium since it was rebuilt. The match was contested between Luton Town and Scunthorpe United. Luton won the match 3–2 with Claude Gnakpa scoring the winner five minutes into extra-time.

Luton's victory was a single positive note in an otherwise terrible season for the club. They started the season with a 30-point deduction imposed by the Football League and Football Association for various financial irregularities, despite the fact that these misdemeanours were carried out by the club's previous owners who had not been in charge since January 2008. Despite accumulating enough points to mathematically remain in League Two, they were twelve points from safety when the final was played and were ultimately relegated out of the Football League. They became the first club to win the Football League Trophy and suffer relegation from the Football League in the same season. As the competition is usually only contested by teams from Leagues One and Two, it was uncertain whether Luton could defend their trophy. On 15 June 2009, Luton's request to play in the competition in 2009–10 was denied by the Football League.

== Background ==
Luton and Scunthorpe went into the match in vastly different positions. Scunthorpe were in the play-off positions in League One and hoping to secure both promotion to the Football League Championship and claim the Football League Trophy in the same season. Luton, on the other hand, were bottom of The Football League and facing relegation into non-League football, having been given a 30-point deduction at the beginning of the season for financial irregularities. Both teams were playing in their first Football League Trophy final.

== Match details ==
5 April 2009
13:15 BST

Luton Town	3–2 (a.e.t.)	Scunthorpe United
Martin 32'; Craddock 70'; Gnakpa 95'	Report	Hooper 14'; McCann 88'

Wembley Stadium, London
Attendance: 55,378
Referee: Phil Crossley (Kent)

Luton Town	Scunthorpe United

GK	1	(England) Dean Brill
RB	15	(England) Ed Asafu-Adjaye
CB	20	(England) Michael Spillane
CB	6	(England) George Pilkington
LB	11	(Republic of Ireland) Lewis Emanuel
RM	8	(England) Kevin Nicholls (c)	(yellow card) 29'
CM	4	(Republic of Ireland) Keith Keane
CM	16	(England) Rossi Jarvis		(substituted off) 117'
LM	14	(England) Asa Hall
CF	18	(England) Chris Martin	(yellow card) 67'
CF	24	(England) Tom Craddock		(substituted off) 85'
Substitutes:
GK	35	(England) David Button
DF	2	(France) Claude Gnakpa		(substituted on) 85'
DF	3	(England) Sol Davis
DF	5	(England) Ian Roper
FW	9	(England) Sam Parkin		(substituted on) 117'
Manager:
(England) Mick Harford

GK	1	(Republic of Ireland) Joe Murphy
RB	6	(Republic of Ireland) Cliff Byrne (c)
CB	26	(England) Krystian Pearce		(substituted off) 85'
CB	15	(England) David Mirfin
LB	3	(England) Marcus Williams
RM	7	(England) Matt Sparrow		(substituted off) 77'
CM	31	(England) Henri Lansbury
CM	17	(Northern Ireland) Grant McCann
LM	23	(England) Kevan Hurst		(substituted off) 63'
CF	10	(England) Gary Hooper
CF	9	(England) Paul Hayes
Substitutes:
GK	22	(England) Josh Lillis
MF	16	(England) Martyn Woolford		(substituted on) 77'
MF	18	(England) Sam Togwell		(substituted on) 63'
MF	24	(England) Andrew Wright	(yellow card) 93'	(substituted on) 85'
FW	30	(England) Ben May
Manager:
(England) Nigel Adkins

MATCH OFFICIALS

- Assistant referees:
  - Dave McCallum (Tyne & Wear)
  - David Unsworth (Greater Manchester)
- Fourth official: Richard Beeby (Northamptonshire)

MATCH RULES

- 90 minutes
- 30 minutes of extra-time if necessary
- Penalty shoot-out if scores still level
- Five named substitutes, of which up to three may be used

=== Protests ===
During the match, many of Luton's 40,000 fans unfurled flags featuring the slogans "Thanks for Sweet FA" and "The FA & Football League – Killing Small Clubs Since 1992" in protest at the actions taken against the club from the footballing authorities. Football League chairman Lord Mawhinney was widely booed, among other less savoury chants, for his part in the club's demise.

== Route to the final ==
=== Luton Town ===
Round 1 (South)	received bye		
Round 2 (South)	Luton Town	2–2	Brentford
	(Luton Town won 4–3 on penalties)		
Quarter-finals (South)	Walsall	0–1	Luton Town
Semi-finals (South)	Luton Town	1–0	Colchester United
Final (South, 1st leg)	Brighton & Hove Albion	0–0	Luton Town
Final (South, 2nd leg)	Luton Town	1–1	Brighton & Hove Albion
	(1–1 on aggregate. Luton Town won 4–3 on penalties)		

=== Scunthorpe United ===
Round 1 (North)	Scunthorpe United	2–1	Notts County
Round 2 (North)	Scunthorpe United	2–1	Grimsby Town
Quarter-finals (North)	Scunthorpe United	1–0	Rochdale
Semi-finals (North)	Scunthorpe United	2–1	Tranmere Rovers
Final (North, 1st leg)	Scunthorpe United	2–0	Rotherham United
Final (North, 2nd leg)	Rotherham United	0–1	Scunthorpe United
	(Scunthorpe United won 3–0 on aggregate)		

== Post-match ==
Luton manager Mick Harford paid tribute to his players, saying "the players knew when they came to the club that they could be non-League players next season. They put their necks on the line. Today their camaraderie, spirit and togetherness was there for all to see." He also praised the "special" Luton fans, saying "They've had it tough down the years, with [the club] being in and out of administration and having sanctions put upon them. We have the second-highest league attendance in League Two and the highest away following, and they've turned out again today."

Scunthorpe manager Nigel Adkins congratulated Luton on their victory but also lamented his own side's shortcomings, saying after the match "Credit to Luton. I congratulate Mick Harford, but we have to learn from this negative experience and use it in a positive way. I will make sure [the players] will remember this because it's not nice... We will draw a line under it and make sure we come back to Wembley in the play-off final – and make sure we win."

Luton were relegated on 13 April 2009, only a week after their Football League Trophy victory. Their relegation was confirmed when they could only manage a draw against Chesterfield, while the only club they could catch, Grimsby Town, won against Notts County. Cliff Byrne secured a place in the League One play-offs for Scunthorpe at the expense of Tranmere Rovers with a goal two minutes from the end of their final game. They returned to Wembley for the League One play-off final and won promotion in May, beating Millwall 3–2.
