= Jake Howells =

British footballer (born 1991)

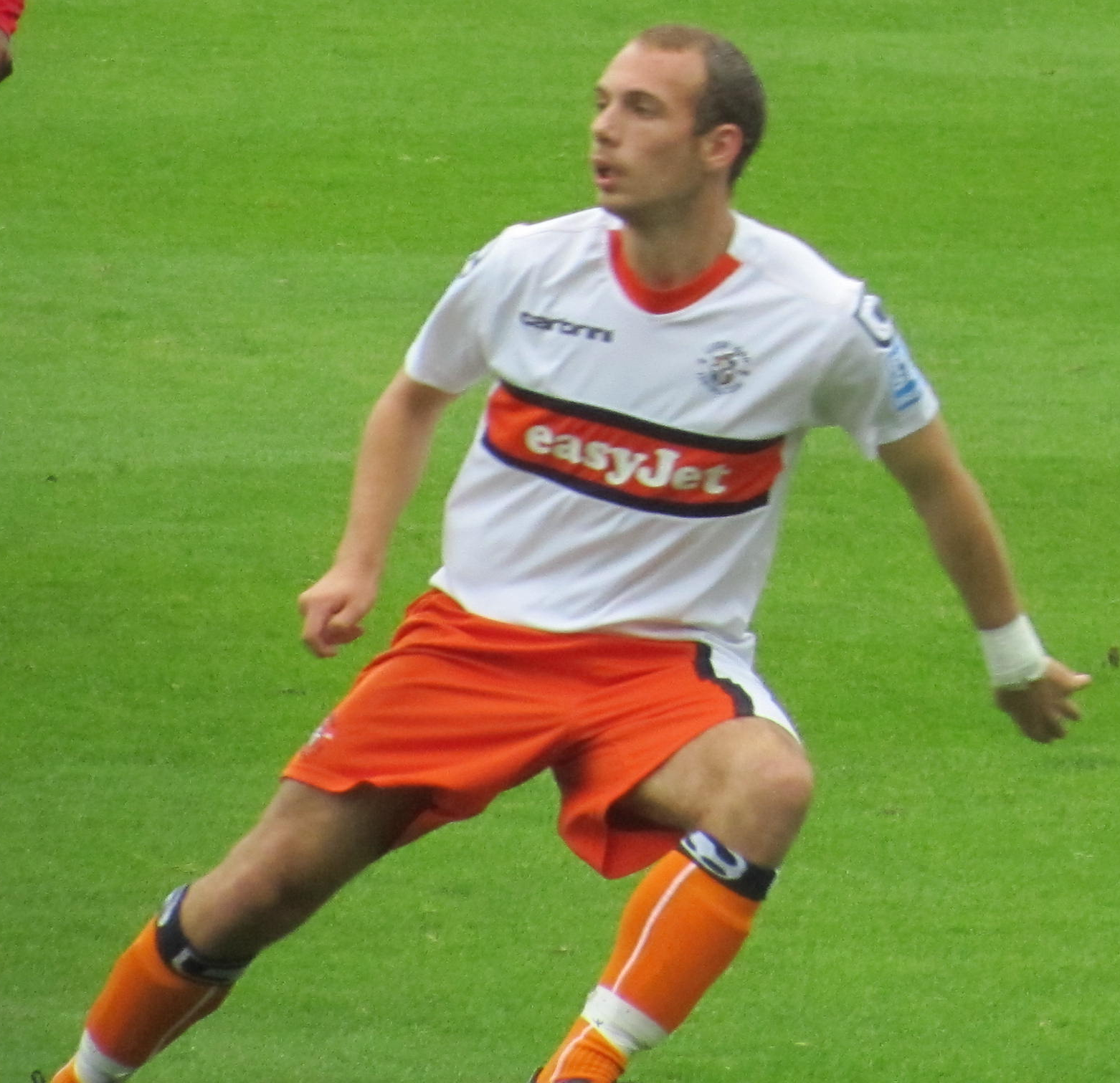
- Howells playing for Luton Town in 2011

Personal information
- Full name: Jake Thomas Howells
- Date of birth: 18 April 1991 (age 35)
- Place of birth: St Albans, England
- Height: 5 ft 9 in (1.75 m)
- Positions: Defender; midfielder

Team information
- Current team: Kings Langley

Youth career
- Hemel Hempstead Town
- Watford
- 2007–2008: Luton Town

Senior career*
Years	Team	Apps	(Gls)
2008–2016	Luton Town	320	(29)
2015	→ Yeovil Town (loan)	6	(0)
2016–2017	Eastleigh	14	(1)
2017–2018	Dagenham & Redbridge	48	(1)
2017	→ Ebbsfleet United (loan)	1	(0)
2018–2019	Billericay Town	42	(1)
2019–2021	Hemel Hempstead Town	39	(0)
2021–	Kings Langley	1	(0)

International career^{‡}
2009–2011	England C	4	(1)
2011–2012	Wales U21	5	(0)
- * Club domestic league appearances and goals as of 22:26, 31 October 2021 (UTC) ‡ National team caps and goals as of 19:03, 22 November 2015 (UTC)

Jake Thomas Howells (born 18 April 1991) is a former professional footballer who played as a defender or a midfielder for Luton Town. He was capped by the England C team four times from 2009 to 2011 and has represented Wales at under-21 level.

== Club career ==
=== Luton Town ===
Born in St Albans, Hertfordshire, Howells began his youth career at Hemel Hempstead Town, prior to spending time in the youth system at Watford, before signing for rivals Luton Town in July 2007. After impressing in the Luton youth team, Howells made his first-team debut as a substitute on the final day of the 2007–08 season in a 1–0 defeat to Huddersfield Town, having turned 17 just three weeks earlier. Soon after, Howells revealed that he had turned down offers to join Premier League clubs Portsmouth and Fulham while in the youth team, and had instead chose to further his career at Luton.

Howells became a regular in the first-team during 2008–09, making his first appearance on 4 October 2008 in a 1–1 draw with Bradford City, coming on as a 37th-minute substitute for Sol Davis. He finished the season with 28 league appearances, primarily playing as a left-back and occasionally as a left winger. With the exception of the final, Howells played in every match of Luton's Football League Trophy success, receiving a winner's medal at Wembley Stadium. Howells won the club's Young Player of the Season award following his impressive season and signing his first professional contract with Luton soon after.

Howells scored his first senior goal the next season in a 4–3 win away to Cambridge United on 26 September 2009. Following the departure of Mick Harford and the subsequent arrival of new Luton manager Richard Money, Howells was pushed forward from his regular left-back position onto the left wing, scoring five further goals in the process, including two in a 6–3 victory over Histon. On 25 April 2010, Howells was named as Luton's Young Player of the Season for the second successive season.

On 25 November 2010, it was announced that Howells had signed a new two-year contract with Luton. With an injury to regular left-back Fred Murray in December 2010, Howells reverted to his original position in defence, helping Luton keep six clean sheets during the month of January. After another solid season in a number of positions, including central midfield, Howells again received the Young Player of the Season award and, in doing so, became the second Luton player, after Kevin Foley to win the accolade for three consecutive seasons.

The 2011–12 season saw Howells used primarily at left-back due to injuries to other players; he played in that position in the team that lost 2–1 to York City in the 2012 Conference Premier play-off final at Wembley Stadium in May 2012. The next month saw him sign a new three-year contract and, with the departure of Keith Keane to Preston North End, Howells became the team's current longest serving player at the age of 21, having made 183 appearances by the end of the season. Moved back into midfield by new Luton manager Paul Buckle in the 2012–13 season, Howells scored his first goal of the campaign within the first 45 seconds of a 4–1 win at home to Macclesfield Town on 1 September 2012.

Another managerial change saw Buckle replaced by the experienced John Still in February 2013. Howells scored the first goal under Still's reign in a 1–0 win away to Stockport County on 2 March 2013. As under previous managers, Howells continued to be played in a variety of roles, including on the left side of attack and in the hole behind two strikers. During the 2013–14 season, at the age of 22, Howells made his 250th appearance for Luton on 2 November 2013 in a 0–0 draw with Gateshead. He became the club's regular penalty-taker, successfully converting six out of six penalties. Howells finished the season with eight league goals in 35 appearances as the club won the Conference Premier title and therefore promotion into League Two.

In July 2014, Howells signed a new two-year contract with Luton. On 17 January 2015, Howells made his 300th appearance for the club at the age of 23 in a 1–0 win over Plymouth Argyle. He finished 2014–15 with 41 appearances and five goals as Luton finished in eighth place on their return to the Football League. In the summer of 2015, Howells asked to leave the club. On 15 July 2015, Luton manager John Still confirmed that he had turned down an offer for Howells' services from an unnamed club. He was not given a squad number by the club when they were announced five days later.

On 11 September 2015, Howells joined Luton's fellow League Two club Yeovil Town on a one-month loan. He finished his loan spell with seven appearances and returned to Luton on 12 October. Howells was left out of the first-team squad by Still upon his return, but was recalled to the starting lineup by interim manager Andy Awford following Still's sacking in December 2015 and was assigned squad number 40. He made his first Luton appearance of 2015–16 in a 3–2 win away to Exeter City on 19 December. Howells admitted he had no complaints over his treatment by Still, stating that "maybe it was the wrong step" to ask to leave the club in the summer. Following the appointment of Nathan Jones as Luton manager, Howells' run in the first-team continued, playing in every match under Jones' management until picking up a knee injury, for which he underwent a scan. Shortly after, it was confirmed Howells would require a knee operation, resulting in a spell on the sidelines. He returned to first-team football as a 94th-minute substitute for Josh McQuoid in a 3–2 win away to Oxford United on 16 April 2016. Howells finished the season with 17 appearances, but his contract with Luton was not renewed after 334 appearances and 31 goals since making his first-team debut at the age of 17 in 2008.

=== Eastleigh ===
On 23 May 2016, Howells signed for National League club Eastleigh on a two-year contract. He made his debut on the opening day of the 2016–17 season in a 2–1 win at home to Guiseley. His first goal for Eastleigh was the team's third goal in a 5–0 win away to Bromley on 29 August. Howells made his final appearance for Eastleigh in a 1–1 draw at home to Swindon Town in the FA Cup on 4 November, in which he suffered a knee injury. He left Eastleigh by mutual consent on 4 January 2017 when manager Martin Allen began reshaping the squad.

=== Dagenham & Redbridge ===
On 20 January 2017, Howells signed a one-and-a-half-year contract with National League club Dagenham & Redbridge. He debuted on 11 February as an 83rd-minute substitute in a 4–1 win away to Southport. After three appearances for Dagenham, Howells signed for National League South club Ebbsfleet United on a one-month loan on 16 March 2017, as the club had sustained a number of injuries. He debuted at left-back five days later in an 8–0 victory at home to Bishop's Stortford. Howells completed the loan spell without making any further appearances. He was released by Dagenham at the end of the 2017–18 season after not being offered a new contract.

=== Billericay Town ===
Howells signed for newly promoted National League South club Billericay Town on 28 June 2018.

=== Hemel Hempstead Town ===
Howells returned to fellow National League South club Hemel Hempstead Town on 29 May 2019. He made his 500th career appearance whilst playing for the club.

=== Kings Langley ===
In July 2021, he signed for Southern Football League Premier Division South side Kings Langley on a free transfer.

=== Berkhamsted FC ===
In early July 2022, Howells was signed for Berkhamsted Football Club by Manager, Chris Devane.

== International career ==
Howells is eligible to play for England by birth, and also qualifies for Wales through one of his grandfathers. Wales enquired about picking Howells for their under-21 team towards the end of the 2008–09 season, but on 30 October 2009 he was named in the England C squad for the match against the Poland U23 team. He earned his first cap in a 2–1 victory. Howells scored his first goal for England C in a 1–0 victory over Estonia in the International Challenge Trophy on 12 October 2010.

On 27 July 2011, Howells was called up to the Wales U21 squad to face Hungary in a friendly match. He said "I'm really proud to be called up and hope to do well when I play." He made his debut as Wales U21 lost 2–1 on 10 August. He made four further appearances during the 2013 UEFA European Under-21 Championship qualification campaign, playing in victories over Montenegro and Andorra, and defeats to the Czech Republic and Armenia as Wales U21 failed to qualify.

== Career statistics ==
As of match played 19 January 2021

Appearances and goals by club, season and competition
Club	Season	League			FA Cup		League Cup		Other		Total	
Club	Season	Division	Apps	Goals	Apps	Goals	Apps	Goals	Apps	Goals	Apps	Goals
Luton Town	2007–08	League One	1	0	0	0	0	0	0	0	1	0
Luton Town	2008–09	League Two	28	0	3	0	0	0	5 (Note: Appearance(s) in Football League Trophy)	0	36	0
Luton Town	2009–10	Conference Premier	31	6	6	0	—		2 (Note: Appearances in Conference Premier play-offs)	0	39	6
Luton Town	2010–11	Conference Premier	42	3	5	0	—		8 (Note: Five appearances in FA Trophy, three appearances in Conference Premier play-offs)	0	55	3
Luton Town	2011–12	Conference Premier	42	5	3	0	—		7 (Note: Four appearances and one goal in FA Trophy, three appearances in Conference Premier play-offs)	1	52	6
Luton Town	2012–13	Conference Premier	41	3	6	0	—		5 (Note: Appearance(s) in FA Trophy)	0	52	3
Luton Town	2013–14	Conference Premier	35	8	2	0	—		4	0	41	8
Luton Town	2014–15	League Two	36	4	4	1	0	0	1	0	41	5
Luton Town	2015–16	League Two	17	0	0	0	0	0	—		17	0
Luton Town	Total		273	29	29	1	0	0	32	1	334	31
Yeovil Town (loan)	2015–16	League Two	6	0	—		—		1	0	7	0
Eastleigh	2016–17	National League	14	1	1	0	—		0	0	15	1
Dagenham & Redbridge	2016–17	National League	4	0	—		—		0	0	4	0
Dagenham & Redbridge	2017–18	National League	44	1	2	0	—		1	0	47	1
Dagenham & Redbridge	Total		48	1	2	0	—		1	0	51	1
Ebbsfleet United (loan)	2016–17	National League South	1	0	—		—		—		1	0
Billericay Town	2018–19	National League South	42	1	5	0	—		3 (Note: Two appearances in FA Trophy, one in Essex Senior Cup)	0	50	1
Hemel Hempstead Town	2019–20	National League South	26	0	1	0	—		3 (Note: Two appearances in FA Trophy, one in Herts Senior Cup)	0	30	0
Hemel Hempstead Town	2020–21	National League South	13	0	2	0	—		2	0	17	0
Hemel Hempstead Town	Total		39	0	3	0	—		5	0	47	0
Career total			423	32	40	1	0	0	42	1	505	34

== Honours ==
=== Club ===
Luton Town

- Football League Trophy: 2008–09
- Conference Premier: 2013–14

=== Individual ===
- Luton Town Young Player of the Season: 2008–09, 2009–10, 2010–11
