= 2007–08 Luton Town F.C. season =

English football club season

Luton Town
2007–08 season
- Chairman: David Pinkney
- Manager: Kevin Blackwell (until 16 January); Mick Harford (from 16 January 2008)
- Stadium: Kenilworth Road
- League One: 24th (relegated)
- FA Cup: Third round
- League Cup: Fourth round
- Football League Trophy: Second round
- Top goalscorer: League: All: Paul Furlong and Matthew Spring (12)
Home colours	Away colours

During the 2007–08 English football season, Luton Town competed in League One.

== Season summary ==
After a poor start to the 2007–08 season, the club entered administration on 22 November 2007; Pinkney stated he would fund the club's overheads, while ten points were deducted. Meanwhile, the FA probe on transfer irregularities dragged on, described by Pinkney as "a storm in a teacup". Blackwell was sacked by the administrator on 15 January 2008, to be replaced by former player Mick Harford. The club subsequently entered the custody of the Luton Town Football Club 2020 consortium. Luton were relegated to League Two on 12 April, following a 2–1 home defeat to Brighton & Hove Albion; Luton finished the season in bottom place.

== League table ==
Pos	Team	Pld	W	D	L	GF	GA	GD	Pts	Promotion, qualification or relegation
20	Crewe Alexandra	46	12	14	20	47	65	−18	50	
21	AFC Bournemouth (R)	46	17	7	22	62	72	−10	48 (Note: Bournemouth deducted 10 points for entering administration.)	Relegation to Football League Two
22	Gillingham (R)	46	11	13	22	44	73	−29	46	Relegation to Football League Two
23	Port Vale (R)	46	9	11	26	47	81	−34	38	Relegation to Football League Two
24	Luton Town (R)	46	11	10	25	43	63	−20	33 (Note: Luton deducted 10 points each for entering administration.)	Relegation to Football League Two

Updated to match(es) played on unknown. Source: The Football League
Rules for classification: 1) points; 2) goal difference; 3) number of goals scored.
(R) Relegated

== Results ==
=== League One ===
Date	Opponent	Venue	Result	Attendance	Scorers	Report
11 August 2007	Hartlepool United	Home	2–1	8,013	Currie 36', Goodall 84'	
18 August 2007	Swindon Town	Away	1–2	7,520	Edwards 66'	
25 August 2007	Gillingham	Home	3–1	6,178	Bell 17', Furlong 27', Spring 80' pen.	
1 September 2007	Leeds United	Away	0–1	26,856		
8 September 2007	Bristol Rovers	Home	1–2	6,131	Spring 19' pen.	
14 September 2007	Tranmere Rovers	Away	1–2	6,525	Furlong 5'	
22 September 2007	Port Vale	Home	2–1	6,084	Furlong 30', Bell 86'	
29 September 2007	Huddersfield Town	Away	0–2	9,028		
2 October 2007	Yeovil Town	Away	0–0	4,848		
6 October 2007	Doncaster Rovers	Home	1–1	6,513	Furlong 57'	
15 October 2007	Northampton Town	Home	4–1	5,881	Currie 4', Spring 49' pen., Furlong 62', Spring 90' pen.	
20 October 2007	Crewe Alexandra	Away	0–2	4,490		
27 October 2007	Nottingham Forest	Home	2–1	8,524	Perry 52', Bell 88'	
3 November 2007	Brighton & Hove Albion	Away	1–3	5,317	Edwards 79'	
6 November 2007	Carlisle United	Home	0–0	5,462		
17 November 2007	Walsall	Away	0–0	5,056		
24 November 2007	Southend United	Home	1–0	6,820	Andrew 74'	
4 December 2007	Oldham Athletic	Away	1–1	4,251	Fojut 34'	
14 December 2007	Cheltenham Town	Away	0–1	3,702		
22 December 2007	Tranmere Rovers	Home	1–0	6,070	Edwards 70'	
26 December 2007	Bristol Rovers	Away	1–1	7,556	Edwards 49'	
29 December 2007	Port Vale	Away	2–1	4,224	Fojut 3', Spring 90'	
1 January 2008	Yeovil Town	Home	1–0	6,811	Andrew 48'	
12 January 2008	Swansea City	Home	1–3	6,756	Furlong 74'	
19 January 2008	Leyton Orient	Away	1–2	5,516	Keane 67'	
22 January 2008	AFC Bournemouth	Away	3–4	3,489	Spring 45' pen., Morgan 60', Furlong 78'	
26 January 2008	Leeds United	Home	1–1	9,297	Parkin 90'	
29 January 2008	Swindon Town	Home	0–1	5,738		
2 February 2008	Hartlepool United	Away	0–4	3,913		
9 February 2008	AFC Bournemouth	Home	1–4	5,897	Emanuel 50'	
16 February 2008	Leyton Orient	Home	0–1	6,412		
22 February 2008	Swansea City	Away	0–1	14,122		
26 February 2008	Millwall	Home	1–1	6,417	Furlong 19'	
1 March 2008	Walsall	Home	0–1	6,157		
8 March 2008	Southend United	Away	0–2	8,241		
11 March 2008	Carlisle United	Away	1–2	5,489	Bell 51'	
15 March 2008	Oldham Athletic	Home	3–0	5,417	Charles 20', Spring 33' pen., Emanuel 35'	
22 March 2008	Cheltenham Town	Home	1–1	6,087	Parkin 24'	
24 March 2008	Millwall	Away	0–0	8,375		
29 March 2008	Crewe Alexandra	Home	2–1	5,465	Spring 4', 78' pen.	
1 April 2008	Gillingham	Away	1–2	6,142	Parkin 19'	
5 April 2008	Northampton Town	Away	1–2	5,132	Parkin 90'	
12 April 2008	Brighton & Hove Albion	Home	1–2	6,652	Parkin 49'	
19 April 2008	Nottingham Forest	Away	0–1	17,331		
26 April 2008	Doncaster Rovers	Away	0–2	9,332		
3 May 2008	Huddersfield Town	Home	0–1	6,539		

=== FA Cup ===
Round	Date	Opponent	Venue	Result	Attendance	Scorers	Report
First round	10 November 2007	Brentford	Home	1–1	4,167	Andrew 79'	
First round replay	27 November 2007	Brentford	Away	2–0	2,643	Coyne 36', Fojut 61'	
Second round	11 December 2007	Nottingham Forest	Home	1–0	5,758	Andrew 54'	
Third round	6 January 2008	Liverpool	Home	1–1	10,226	Riise 77' o.g.	
Third round replay	15 January 2008	Liverpool	Away	0–5	41,446		

=== League Cup ===
Round	Date	Opponent	Venue	Result	Attendance	Scorers	Report
First round	14 August 2007	Dagenham & Redbridge	Away	2–1	1,754	Spring 42' pen., Talbot 68'	
Second round	28 August 2007	Sunderland	Home	3–0	4,401	Bell 16', Furlong 43', 75'	
Third round	25 September 2007	Charlton Athletic	Home	3–1 (a.e.t.)	4,534	Robinson 43', Spring 105', Talbot 117'	
Fourth round	31 October 2007	Everton	Home	0–1 (a.e.t.)	8,944		

=== Football League Trophy ===
Round	Date	Opponent	Venue	Result	Attendance	Scorers	Report
First round	4 September 2007	Northampton Town	Home	2–0	2,532	Hutchison 12', Peschisolido 48'	
Second round	9 October 2007	Gillingham	Away	3–4	1,417	Furlong 26', 43', Spring 45' pen.	

== Squad ==
Squad at end of season

Note: Flags indicate national team as defined under FIFA eligibility rules; some limited exceptions apply. Players may hold more than one non-FIFA nationality.

No.	Pos.	Nation	Player
1	GK	ENG	Dean Brill
3	DF	ENG	Alan Goodall
4	MF	SCO	Don Hutchison (Note: Hutchison was born in Gateshead, England, but qualifies to represent Scotland internationally.)
5	DF	ENG	Chris Perry
7	FW	ENG	Dean Morgan
8	MF	IRL	David Bell (Note: Bell was born in Kettering, England, but qualifies to represent the Republic of Ireland internationally.)
9	FW	ENG	Sam Parkin
10	MF	ENG	Darren Currie
11	FW	CAN	Paul Peschisolido
12	DF	ENG	Richard Jackson
14	MF	NIR	Steve Robinson
15	MF	ENG	Stephen O'Leary
17	DF	ENG	Lewis Emanuel
19	FW	ENG	Drew Talbot
20	FW	ENG	Calvin Andrew

No.	Pos.	Nation	Player
21	MF	IRL	Keith Keane (Note: Keane was born in Luton, England, but qualifies to represent the Republic of Ireland internationally.)
22	MF	ENG	Richard Langley
24	DF	ENG	Paul Underwood
25	MF	ENG	Matthew Spring
26	DF	ENG	Sol Davis
28	FW	NIR	Paul McVeigh
29	FW	ENG	Paul Furlong
32	FW	ENG	Ryan Charles
35	GK	ENG	Marlon Beresford
36	GK	ENG	Ross Faulds
37	DF	ENG	George Beavan
38	DF	ENG	Ed Asafu-Adjaye
39	MF	ENG	Harry Hogarth
40	DF	ENG	Jake Howells

=== Left club during season ===
Note: Flags indicate national team as defined under FIFA eligibility rules; some limited exceptions apply. Players may hold more than one non-FIFA nationality.

No.	Pos.	Nation	Player
2	DF	IRL	Kevin Foley (to Wolverhampton Wanderers)
6	DF	AUS	Chris Coyne (to Colchester United)
16	MF	WAL	David Edwards (to Wolverhampton Wanderers)
18	MF	CRO	Ahmet Brković (to Millwall)
27	GK	ENG	Ben Alnwick (on loan from Tottenham Hotspur)

No.	Pos.	Nation	Player
30	GK	IRL	David Forde (on loan from Cardiff City)
31	DF	POL	Jarosław Fojut (on loan from Bolton Wanderers)
33	MF	IRL	Marc Wilson (on loan from Portsmouth)
34	MF	ENG	Anthony Grant (on loan from Chelsea)

== Transfers ==
=== In ===
Date	Position	Name	Club From	Fee
26 June 2007	Midfielder	David Edwards	Shrewsbury Town	£250,000
29 June 2007	Defender	Alan Goodall	Rochdale	Free Transfer
2 July 2007	Midfielder	Darren Currie	Ipswich Town	Free Transfer
4 July 2007	Forward	Paul Furlong	Queens Park Rangers	Free Transfer
5 July 2007	Defender	Chris Perry	West Bromwich Albion	Free Transfer
16 July 2007	Forward	Paul Peschisolido	Derby County	Free Transfer
26 July 2007	Midfielder	Don Hutchison	Coventry City	Free Transfer
8 August 2007	Defender	Richard Jackson	Derby County	Free Transfer
10 August 2007	Forward	Paul McVeigh	Norwich City	Free Transfer

=== Out ===
- Russell Perrett
- Warren Feeney
- Michael Leary
- Adam Boyd
- Danny Stevens
- Shaun Ross
- Leon Barnett
- Markus Heikkinen
- Peter Holmes
- Chris Pendleton - released
- Kevin Foley – Wolverhampton Wanderers
- Ahmet Brković – Millwall
- Chris Coyne – Colchester United

=== Loan in ===
Date	Position	Name	Club From	Length
31 August 2007	Defender	Jarosław Fojut	Bolton Wanderers	Until 1 January
27 September 2007	Goalkeeper	Ben Alnwick	Tottenham Hotspur	Three months (recalled 26 October)

=== Loan out ===
Date	Position	Name	Club To	Length
27 September 2007	Defender	Sol Davis	Peterborough United	Two months (recalled 8 October)

== Player statistics ==
Players arranged in alphabetical order by surname.

Pos.	Name	League		Cup		Total	
Pos.	Name	Apps	Goals	Apps	Goals	Apps	Goals
GK	(England) Ben Alnwick	4	0	0	0	4	0
FW	(England) Calvin Andrew	19 (20)	2	6 (3)	2	25 (23)	4
DF	(England) Ed Asafu-Adjaye	7	0	0	0	7	0
DF	(England) George Beavan	1 (1)	0	0	0	1 (1)	0
MF	(Republic of Ireland) David Bell	32	4	9	1	41	5
GK	(England) Marlon Beresford	0	0	0	0	0	0
GK	(England) Dean Brill	37	0	10	0	47	0
MF	(Croatia) Ahmet Brković	0 (1)	0	1 (2)	0	1 (3)	0
FW	(England) Ryan Charles	6 (1)	1	0	0	6 (1)	1
DF	(Australia) Chris Coyne	18	0	7	1	25	1
MF	(England) Darren Currie	25 (6)	2	5 (2)	0	30 (8)	2
DF	(England) Sol Davis	15	0	0	0	15	0
MF	(Wales) David Edwards	18 (1)	4	7	0	25 (1)	4
DF	(England) Lewis Emanuel	15 (2)	2	2	0	17 (2)	2
DF	(Poland) Jarosław Fojut	15 (1)	2	7	1	22 (1)	3
GK	(Republic of Ireland) David Forde	5	0	1	0	6	0
FW	(England) Paul Furlong	23 (9)	8	5 (2)	4	28 (11)	12
DF	(England) Alan Goodall	25 (4)	1	6 (1)	0	31 (5)	1
MF	(England) Anthony Grant	1 (3)	0	0 (2)	0	1 (5)	0
DF	(England) Jake Howells	0 (1)	0	0	0	0 (1)	0
MF	(Scotland) Don Hutchison	15 (6)	0	5	1	20 (6)	1
DF	(England) Richard Jackson	27 (2)	0	8	0	35 (2)	0
MF	(Republic of Ireland) Keith Keane	27 (1)	1	4 (2)	0	31 (3)	1
MF	(England) Richard Langley	0 (1)	0	0	0	0 (1)	0
FW	(Northern Ireland) Paul McVeigh	15 (10)	0	2 (6)	0	17 (16)	0
FW	(England) Dean Morgan	8 (8)	1	3 (2)	0	11 (10)	1
MF	(England) Stephen O'Leary	10 (6)	0	0 (2)	0	10 (8)	0
FW	(England) Sam Parkin	12 (7)	5	1	0	13 (7)	5
DF	(England) Chris Perry	35	1	9	0	44	1
FW	(Canada) Paul Peschisolido	2 (2)	0	0 (1)	1	2 (3)	1
MF	(Northern Ireland) Steve Robinson	25 (3)	0	7	1	32 (3)	1
MF	(England) Matthew Spring	43	9	10	3	53	12
FW	(England) Drew Talbot	15 (12)	0	5 (4)	2	20 (16)	2
DF	(England) Paul Underwood	0	0	0	0	0	0
MF	(Republic of Ireland) Marc Wilson	4	0	0	0	4	0

== See also ==
- List of Luton Town F.C. seasons
