= Gnakpa =

Gnakpa is a surname. Notable people with the surname include:

- Claude Gnakpa (born 1983), French footballer
- Modeste Gnakpa (born 1988), French-Ivorian footballer
