= Ed Asafu-Adjaye =

English footballer

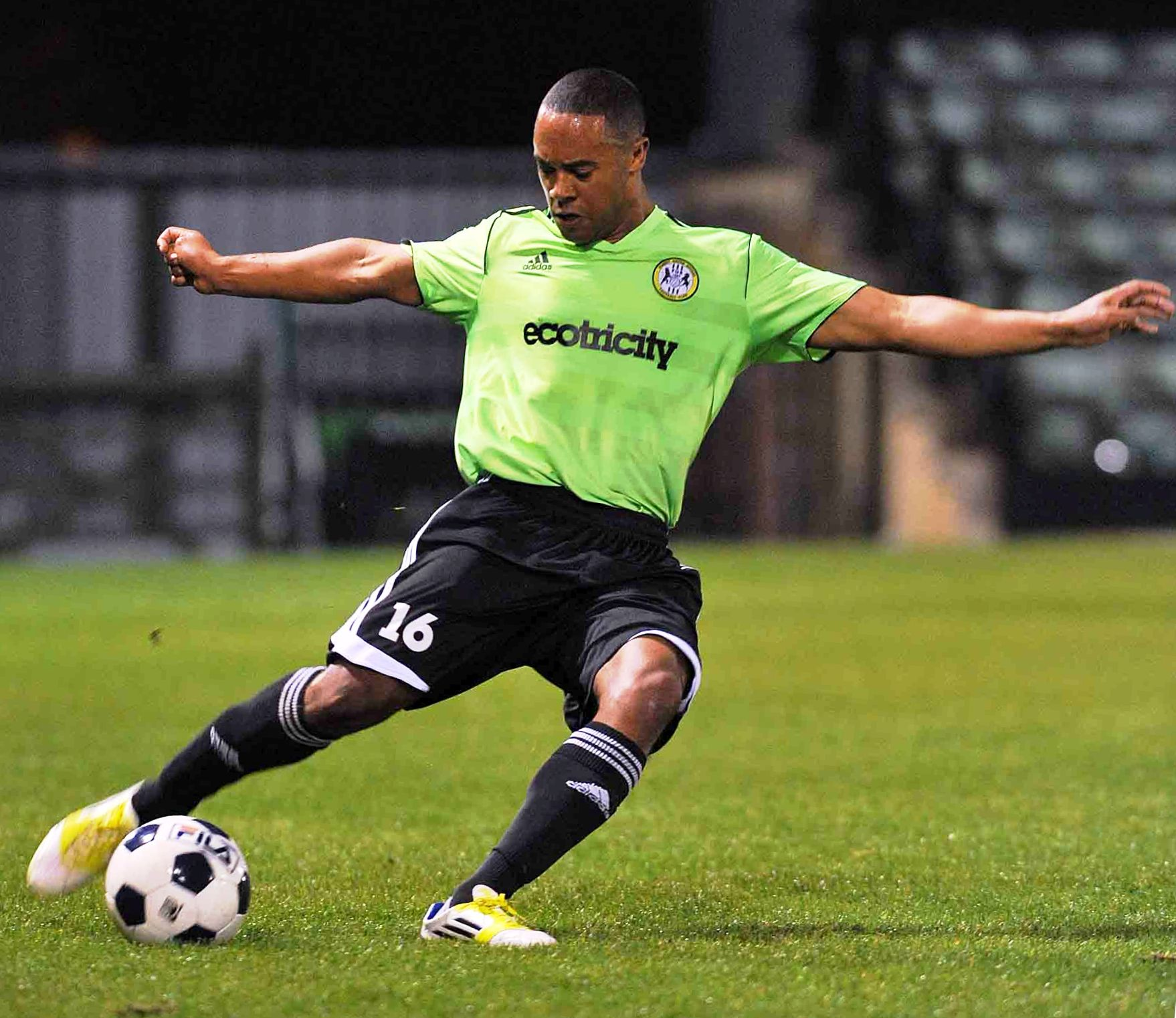
- Asafu-Adjaye playing for Forest Green Rovers in 2012–13

Personal information
- Full name: Edward Yaw Okyere Asafu-Adjaye
- Date of birth: 22 December 1988 (age 37)
- Place of birth: Southwark, England
- Height: 5 ft 11 in (1.80 m)
- Position: Defender

Team information
- Current team: Royston Town

Youth career
- 2005–2007: Luton Town

Senior career*
Years	Team	Apps	(Gls)
2007–2012	Luton Town	60	(1)
2007	→ Walton & Hersham (loan)	7	(3)
2008	→ Salisbury City (loan)	14	(0)
2011	→ Histon (loan)	5	(0)
2012–2014	Forest Green Rovers	40	(0)
2014–2017	Hemel Hempstead Town	52	(2)
2017	→ Kings Langley (loan)	1	(0)
2017–2018	Royston Town	51	(0)
2018–2019	Hayes & Yeading United	50	(2)
2019–	Royston Town	41	(0)
- * Club domestic league appearances and goals as of 23:00, 18 January 2020 (UTC)

Edward Yaw Okyere Asafu-Adjaye (born 22 December 1988) is an English footballer who plays for Southern League Division One Central side Royston Town, where he plays as a defender.

== Career ==
Born in Southwark, London, Asafu-Adjaye started his career at Luton Town as a scholar, he was sent on loan to Isthmian League Premier Division side Walton & Hersham, making his debut for 'the Swans' in March 2007 and scoring in a 1–0 win over Carshalton Athletic. He went on to make seven appearances during his loan spell, playing at right-back and scoring three goals.

Asafu-Adjaye was rewarded with a one-year professional contract during the summer of 2007. Unable to break into the Luton side at the beginning of the 2007–08 season, he was instead loaned to Conference Premier side Salisbury City in January 2008 by then-Hatters manager Kevin Blackwell. He made his Salisbury debut in a 3–1 home win over Oxford United. Asafu-Adjaye continued to impress during his time with Salisbury, in which time he earned several man-of-the-match accolades.

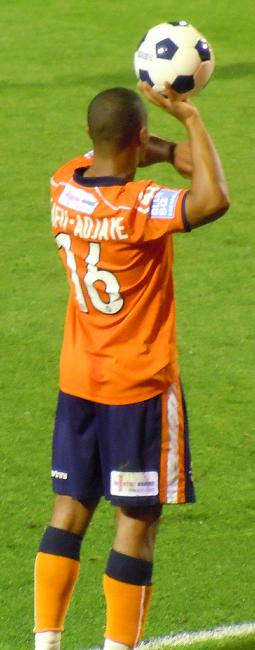
Asafu-Adjaye playing for Luton Town in 2011

With Luton Town in administration and heading for relegation to League Two, new manager Mick Harford decided to recall Asafu-Adjaye from his loan spell in late March, and he made his Luton Town debut in a 2–1 home victory over Crewe Alexandra just days after returning to Kenilworth Road. Operating at right-back, he went on to make seven league appearances for the Hatters as they were relegated. During the summer of 2008 he signed a new contract, despite interest from his former loan club Salisbury City.

In the 2008–09 season, Asafu-Adjaye established himself as the first choice right-back in the Luton team, and also started at centre-back in Luton's 3–2 victory over Scunthorpe United in the Football League Trophy final at Wembley Stadium. On 30 June 2009, Asafu-Adjaye agreed to a one-year contract extension, keeping him at Luton until 2011.

Out of favour at Luton, having made just two league appearances during the 2010–11 season, Asafu-Adjaye joined Histon on loan until the end of the season on 25 March 2011. He made five appearances for the Stutes, before being recalled due to an injury to full-back Fred Murray. New Luton manager Gary Brabin installed Asafu-Adjaye into the first-team as he played in a 3–0 victory over Eastbourne Borough on 23 April. He started at left-back in the crucial first leg of the play-off semi-final against Wrexham on 5 May, scoring his first goal for the club, a half-volley from 18 yards, in a 3–0 win.

On 12 July 2011, Asafu-Adjaye agreed to sign a new contract with Luton. He made thirteen appearances during the season, and on 30 April 2012 it was announced that Asafu-Adjaye was to be released from Luton.

On 2 July 2012, it was announced that Asafu-Adjaye had signed for Forest Green Rovers on a one-year contract. He made his Forest Green debut on 11 August 2012 in a 1–1 draw with Cambridge United. After an impressive opening few months at The New Lawn, he signed a contract extension that would keep him at the club until June 2014. On 28 April 2014, having made 40 league appearances in two seasons for the club, he was released along with nine other players at the end of his contract.

On 8 August 2014, Asafu-Adjaye signed for newly promoted Conference South side Hemel Hempstead Town. He made his debut for the club the next day on 9 August in a 1–0 away win over Basingstoke Town.

In the summer 2019, Asafu-Adjaye returned to Royston Town for the second time after a year at Hayes & Yeading United.

== Career statistics ==
As of 18 March 2014.

Appearances and goals by club, season and competition
Club	Season	League^{[A]}		FA Cup		League Cup		Other^{[B]}		Total	
Club	Season	Apps	Goals	Apps	Goals	Apps	Goals	Apps	Goals	Apps	Goals
Luton Town	2007–08	7	0	0	0	0	0	0	0	7	0
Luton Town	2008–09	19	0	0	0	0	0	5	0	24	0
Luton Town	2009–10	20	0	3	0	0	0	0	0	23	0
Luton Town	2010–11	8	1	3	0	0	0	4	0	15	1
Luton Town	2011–12	9	0	0	0	0	0	4	0	13	0
Luton Town	Total	63	1	6	0	0	0	13	0	82	1
Walton & Hersham (loan)	2006–07	3	3	0	0	0	0	0	0	3	3
Salisbury City (loan)	2007–08	14	0	0	0	0	0	0	0	14	0
Histon (loan)	2010–11	5	0	0	0	0	0	0	0	5	0
Forest Green Rovers	2012–13	24	0	0	0	0	0	0	0	24	0
Forest Green Rovers	2013–14	16	0	1	0	0	0	4	0	19	0
Forest Green Rovers	Total	40	0	1	0	0	0	4	0	41	0
Career totals		106	4	7	0	0	0	17	0	130	4

== Honours ==
Luton Town

- Football League Trophy: 2008–09

== Footnotes ==
A. The "League" column constitutes appearances and goals in the League competition.
B. The "Other" column constitutes appearances and goals in the Football League Trophy and FA Trophy.
