= George Pilkington =

English footballer

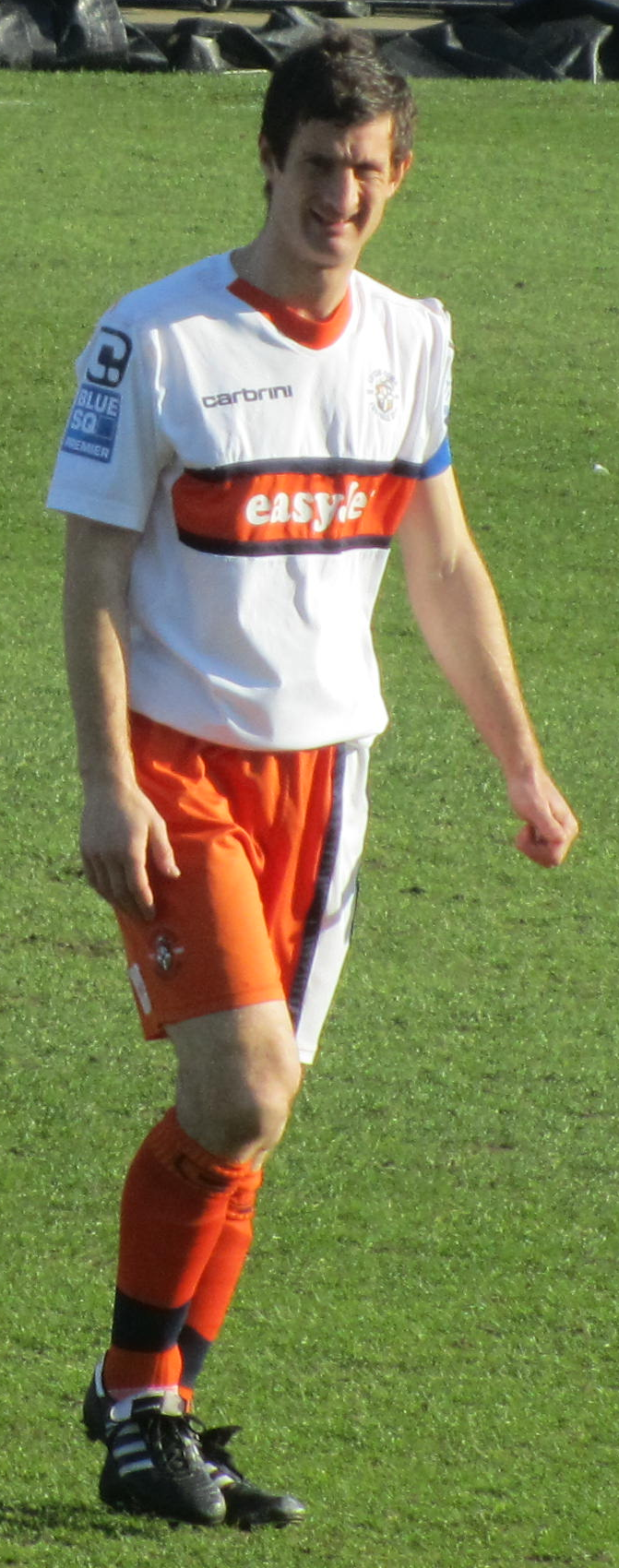
- Pilkington playing for Luton Town in 2011

Personal information
- Full name: George Edward Pilkington
- Date of birth: 7 November 1981 (age 45)
- Place of birth: Rugeley, England
- Height: 5 ft 11 in (1.80 m)
- Position: Defender

Youth career
- Stone Dominoes
- 1998–2002: Everton

Senior career*
Years	Team	Apps	(Gls)
2002–2003	Everton	0	(0)
2002–2003	→ Exeter City (loan)	7	(0)
2003–2008	Port Vale	224	(11)
2008–2012	Luton Town	140	(11)
2012–2014	Mansfield Town	6	(0)
2013	→ Forest Green Rovers (loan)	8	(0)
2014	→ Macclesfield Town (loan)	16	(2)
2014–2018	Macclesfield Town	159	(2)
Total		576	(28)

International career
- England U17
- * Club domestic league appearances and goals

George Edward Pilkington (born 7 November 1981) is an English former professional footballer who is now Technical Director at Northern Premier League Division One West club Stafford Rangers. During his playing career, he was a defender. He made 663 league and cup appearances across a 16-year professional career in the English Football League and National League.

Pilkington started his career at Everton in 1998, staying at the club for five years without ever making a first-team appearance. In 2002, he had a short loan spell at Exeter City. In 2003, he signed with Port Vale, a club where he spent another five years, this time as a key member of the first team. He was announced as the club's Player of the Year in the 2005–06 season. After making over 250 appearances for the club, he moved to Luton Town. After a slow start due to injuries, Pilkington became an ever-present in the Luton defence and helped the club win the 2009 Football League Trophy. He was also voted Player of the Season in the 2009–10 season. He switched to Mansfield Town in June 2012 and won the Conference Premier title with the club in 2012–13. He joined Forest Green Rovers on loan in August 2013 and was loaned out to Macclesfield Town in February 2014. He joined Macclesfield permanently in the summer and was voted Player of the Year in his first three seasons at the club. He also played in the club's defeat at the 2017 FA Trophy final. He helped the club to win promotion back to the Football League as champions of the National League in 2017–18 before announcing his retirement in June 2018.

== Career ==
=== Everton ===
Born in Rugeley, Staffordshire, Pilkington started his career at Stone Dominoes. He later became a trainee at Everton's Finch Farm but did not make a first-team appearance for the club after turning professional in November 1998. He was capped at England under-17 level. He was sent on loan to Exeter City in November 2002 and played in twelve games, including in the FA Cup against Premier League side Charlton Athletic, which Exeter lost 3–1. Everton released him at the end of the 2002–03 season.

=== Port Vale ===
Pilkington signed for Brian Horton's Port Vale in June 2003. He became one of the first names in the first XI during his first season, alongside captain and centre-back partner Sam Collins, making 49 appearances in the 2003–04 campaign. At the end of the season, he and fellow rising star Billy Paynter signed long-term contracts at Vale Park.

On 17 September 2004 he saw his first red card at Brentford, during a 2–0 defeat. However, he was generally productive again in 2004–05, as new manager Martin Foyle selected Pilkington for 48 appearances over all competitions.

The 2005–06 saw Pilkington make 53 appearances, becoming an ever-presence in the league. On 29 April 2006 he scored twice in ten minutes to end his thirty-month goal drought in a 3–1 victory over Chesterfield. He signed a new two-year contract the following month, after which he was named club captain, following the departure of Tony Dinning. Vale fans voted him Port Vale F.C. Player of the Year.

The 2006–07 season led Pilkington to captain his side in a mid-table finish, besting Championship sides Preston North End, Queens Park Rangers and Norwich City – before taking Premier League Tottenham Hotspur to extra time.

The 2007–08 was a disaster for the club and the player, as new manager Lee Sinnott stripped Pilkington of the captain's armband, and led the club to relegation into League Two. Despite this, Pilkington said he was keen to stay at the club, though it was soon decided that he would leave in the summer. He had made over 250 appearances for the club.

=== Luton Town ===
Pilkington joined Luton Town on a free transfer in August 2008. A series of recurring injuries picked up throughout the season limited his playing chances, though he returned for the final run-in of games on 17 March 2009. Pilkington played in the Luton side that beat Scunthorpe United 3–2 in the Football League Trophy final at Wembley Stadium. However, he suffered relegation for his second-successive season as Luton lost their Football League status.

The next season, in which Luton contested their football in the Conference Premier, saw Pilkington play in every league game. He also scored his first goals for the club, accumulating six in total, and won four end-of-season awards, including Player of the Year and Players' Player of the Year. At the end of the season, Pilkington signed a two-year extension to his contract, keeping him at Luton until 2012, and was named as club captain for the 2010–11 season. He played 56 games in the campaign, helping his team to the semi-finals of the FA Trophy and to the Conference play-off final; he scored a penalty in the final's shoot-out, held at the City of Manchester Stadium, but AFC Wimbledon won 4–3 to deny Luton a place in the Football League. Pilkington was awarded the Players' Player of the Year award and was named man of the match more than other Luton players that season.

He missed the start of the 2011–12 season due to injury but returned to the first team in October and played 33 league games to help the club secure the play-off position. He converted a penalty at the Racecourse Ground to give Luton a 3–2 aggregate victory over Wrexham. He played in the Wembley final itself, but was powerless to stop York City finishing as 2–1 winners.

=== Mansfield Town ===
In June 2012, Pilkington signed for Mansfield Town, who finished above Luton in the Conference Premier the previous season but also lost in the play-offs. Manager Paul Cox described the signing as "a major coup for the club". Mansfield won promotion into the Football League as Conference champions in 2012–13, though Pilkington was the club's "forgotten man" with only four appearances to his name.

In August 2013, Pilkington joined Conference Premier side Forest Green Rovers in a two-month loan deal. He made his debut at The New Lawn on 10 August in an 8–0 win over Hyde. He made a further seven appearances before being recalled following an injury crisis at Mansfield.

=== Macclesfield Town ===
On 8 February 2014, Pilkington joined Macclesfield Town on a one-month loan. 14 days later he marked his debut for the "Silkmen" with a goal in a 3–2 defeat to Woking at Kingfield Stadium. On 10 March 2014, Pilkington extended his loan spell at Moss Rose for the remainder of the 2013–14 season. He was released by Mansfield at the end of the season, and signed with Macclesfield permanently in July 2014 after manager John Askey described him as a "proper pro".

He missed just two league games of the 2014–15 season as Macclesfield finished one point outside the play-off places, and he was voted the club's Player of the Year. He made 45 appearances across the 2015–16 campaign, as Macclesfield posted a tenth-place finish, and he signed a new one-year contract in May 2016. He also retained his Player of the Year trophy. He made 54 appearances across the 2016–17 campaign, including in the 2017 FA Trophy final at Wembley Stadium, where Macclesfield were beaten 3–2 by York City. He was named as the club's Player of the Year for a third consecutive season. He made 35 appearances across the 2017–18 campaign as Macclesfield won promotion to the Football League as champions of the National League. He announced his retirement in June 2018.

== Coaching career ==
Pilkington retired from playing in June 2018 to take up the position as first-team coach at League One side Shrewsbury Town, having been recruited by former Macclesfield manager John Askey. He left the club five months later following Askey's dismissal. In July 2026, he was appointed as Technical Director at Stafford Rangers.

== Personal life ==
The George Pilkington Award for Literacy was created in 2007 at Packmoor Ormiston Academy.

== Career statistics ==
Appearances and goals by club, season and competition
Club	Season	League			FA Cup		League Cup		Other		Total	
Club	Season	Division	Apps	Goals	Apps	Goals	Apps	Goals	Apps	Goals	Apps	Goals
Everton	2002–03	Premier League	0	0	0	0	0	0	—		0	0
Exeter City (loan)	2002–03	Third Division	7	0	4	0	—		1 (Note: Appearance(s) in Football League Trophy)	0	12	0
Port Vale	2003–04	Second Division	44	1	3	0	1	0	1	0	49	1
Port Vale	2004–05	League One	43	0	2	0	1	0	2	0	48	0
Port Vale	2005–06	League One	46	2	5	0	1	0	1	0	53	2
Port Vale	2006–07	League One	46	6	1	0	4	0	2	0	53	6
Port Vale	2007–08	League One	45	2	3	1	1	0	1	0	50	3
Port Vale	Total		224	11	14	1	8	0	7	0	253	12
Luton Town	2008–09	League Two	18	0	1	0	2	0	1	0	22	0
Luton Town	2009–10	Conference Premier	44	6	6	0	—		3 (Note: One appearance in FA Trophy, two in Conference Premier play-offs)	0	53	6
Luton Town	2010–11	Conference Premier	45	4	5	0	—		6 (Note: Three appearances in FA Trophy, three in Conference Premier play-offs)	0	56	4
Luton Town	2011–12	Conference Premier	33	1	2	0	—		6 (Note: Three appearances in FA Trophy, three appearances and one goal in Conference Premier play-offs)	1	41	2
Luton Town	Total		140	11	14	0	2	0	16	1	172	12
Mansfield Town	2012–13	Conference Premier	4	0	0	0	—		0	0	4	0
Mansfield Town	2013–14	League Two	2	0	1	0	—		—		3	0
Mansfield Town	Total		6	0	1	0	—		0	0	7	0
Forest Green Rovers (loan)	2013–14	Conference Premier	8	0	—		—		—		8	0
Macclesfield Town (loan)	2013–14	Conference Premier	16	2	—		—		—		16	2
Macclesfield Town	2014–15	Conference Premier	44	1	0	0	—		1 (Note: Appearance in FA Trophy)	0	45	1
Macclesfield Town	2015–16	National League	40	0	2	0	—		3	0	45	0
Macclesfield Town	2016–17	National League	42	1	4	0	—		8	0	54	1
Macclesfield Town	2017–18	National League	33	0	1	0	—		1	0	35	0
Macclesfield Town	Total		175	4	7	0	—		13	0	195	4
Career total			576	28	40	1	10	0	37	1	663	30

== Honours ==
Luton Town

- Football League Trophy: 2008–09

Mansfield Town

- Conference Premier: 2012–13

Macclesfield Town

- National League: 2017–18
- FA Trophy runner-up: 2016–17

Individual

- Port Vale Player of the Year: 2005–06
- Conference Premier Player of the Month: August 2009
- Luton Town Player of the Year: 2009–10
- Macclesfield Town Player of the Year: 2014–15, 2015–16, 2016–17
