= Modeste Gnakpa =

French-Ivorian footballer (born 1988)

Personal information
- Date of birth: October 17, 1988 (age 38)
- Place of birth: Abidjan, Ivory Coast
- Height: 1.78 m (5 ft 10 in)
- Position: Defender

Team information
- Current team: KRC Mechelen
- Number: 3

Youth career
- 2002–2004: Aubagne

Senior career*
Years	Team	Apps	(Gls)
2004–2008	Auxerre B	46	(2)
2008–2009	Auxerre	2	(0)
2009–2011	Ceuta	1	(0)
2012–2013	UR La Louvière Centre		
2012–2013	FU Narbonne	8	(0)
2013–	KRC Mechelen	0	(0)
- * Club domestic league appearances and goals as of 18:04, 30 August 2008 (UTC)

Modeste Gnakpa (born October 17, 1988) is a French-Ivorian footballer.

== Career ==
Gnakpa began his career with Aubagne F.C. and joined than in summer 2004 to the reserve of AJ Auxerre. He left Auxerre after five years and signed for Ceuta in summer 2009. In July 2013 he signed for KRC Mechelen in the third division (3A) of the Belgian football league.

== Personal life ==
Modeste was born in Abidjan, Ivory Coast. He is the cousin of Claude Gnakpa, who plays for Luton Town in England.
