= Matthew Barnes-Homer =

English footballer & coach (born 1986)

Personal information
- Full name: Matthew Brian Barnes-Homer
- Date of birth: 25 January 1986 (age 40)
- Place of birth: Dudley, England
- Position: Striker

Team information
- Current team: Hednesford Town

Youth career
- 2001–2004: Wolverhampton Wanderers

Senior career*
Years	Team	Apps	(Gls)
2004	Syracuse Salty Dogs	10	(1)
2004	Aldershot Town		
2005	Hednesford Town		
2005–2006	Bromsgrove Rovers	24	(4)
2006	Tividale		
2006–2007	Willenhall Town		(15)
2007	Wycombe Wanderers	1	(0)
2007–2010	Kidderminster Harriers	98	(45)
2009	→ Luton Town (loan)	10	(15)
2010–2012	Luton Town	64	(40)
2011–2012	→ Rochdale (loan)	5	(1)
2012	Nuneaton Town	4	(0)
2012	Östersunds FK	11	(5)
2012–2013	Macclesfield Town	37	(29)
2013–2014	Forest Green Rovers	18	(15)
2014	Cambridge United	14	(1)
2014	→ Tamworth (loan)	7	(1)
2014	Whitehawk	9	(0)
2014	→ Macclesfield Town (loan)	6	(5)
2014–2015	Macclesfield Town	24	(10)
2015–2016	Aldershot Town	15	(5)
2015	→ Kidderminster Harriers (loan)	7	(7)
2016	Farnborough	5	(0)
2016	Wilmington Hammerheads	29	(3)
2017	Brackley Town	1	(0)
2017	Kettering Town	0	(0)
2017–2021	AFC Telford United	20	(1)
2017	→ Halesowen Town (dual reg.)	3	(0)
2021	→ Stourbridge (dual reg.)	1	(0)
2022	Bromsgrove Sporting	6	(2)
2022–2023	Gloucester City	13	(2)
2023	Brackley Town	0	(0)
2024–2026	Hednesford Town	0	(0)
2026–	Lichfield City	0	(0)

International career^{‡}
2009–2011	England C	5	(2)
- * Club domestic league appearances and goals as of 13:35, 28 March 2024 (UTC) ‡ National team caps and goals as of 18:00, 23 April 2022 (UTC)

Matthew Brian Barnes-Homer (born 25 January 1986) is an English professional footballer who plays for Lichfield City.

Barnes-Homer started his career as a youth player at Wolverhampton Wanderers, where he spent three years. In 2004 he transferred to Aldershot Town. He then played for various wasnon-league clubs in his local West Midlands region between 2005 and 2007 until League Two side Wycombe Wanderers signed him on a short-term contract in March 2007. He was released shortly afterwards, where he joined Conference National side Kidderminster Harriers. After a lean first season at the club, Barnes-Homer established himself as top scorer in the next campaign with 25 goals, averaging almost one goal for every two games.

A similar goal return during 2009–10 prompted interest from former Football League club Luton Town, who signed him in January 2010. He finished the 2010–11 season as Luton's top scorer with 29 goals. He left Luton in early 2012, going on to spend four months at Swedish side Östersunds FK, before returning to the Conference with Macclesfield Town for the start of the 2012–13 season. In August 2013, he signed a two-year contract with Forest Green Rovers. On 10 January 2014, Barnes-Homer signed for Cambridge United on a free transfer until the end of the season.

== Club career ==
Born in Dudley, West Midlands, Barnes-Homer began his career as a 15-year-old trainee at Wolverhampton Wanderers, but was released three years later at the end of the 2003–04 season.He then joined Hednesford Town, where he made one substitute appearance, and was signed by Bromsgrove Rovers in April 2005 after impressing in Bromsgrove's reserve side.

Barnes-Homer had a short spell at Tividale before he joined Willenhall Town in August 2008 and scored a hat-trick on his debut against Stourbridge. After impressive performances for Willenhall, he joined League Two club Wycombe Wanderers in March 2007 after a successful trial. However, he was one of several players released at the end of the 2006–07 season after Wycombe failed to reach the League Two play-offs.

He joined Conference Premier side Kidderminster Harriers in July 2007 after featuring in pre-season games. After scoring 6 league goals during the 2007–08 season, he signed a new one-year contract in April 2008.

Barnes-Homer scored 21 goals the next season, ending the campaign as highest goalscorer at the club as Kidderminster finished narrowly outside the play-offs. He signed a new two-year contract with the club in June 2009.

Barnes-Homer began the 2009–10 season for Kidderminster as he had finished the last, with a return of roughly one goal in every two games. His goalscoring form did not go unnoticed and, on 26 November 2009, Barnes-Homer joined Luton Town, initially on a one-month loan deal. On 13 January 2010 the transfer led to a permanent two-and-a-half-year contract, for which Luton paid Kidderminster a five-figure fee, believed to be around £75,000.

Barnes-Homer made a below-average start to his Luton career, with just three goals in 20 league games. Luton manager Richard Money cited the fact that Barnes-Homer had lost his stepfather mid-season as reason for his poor form. Money believed that in the following season, Luton fans would see the real Matthew Barnes-Homer and that he would be akin to a brand new signing. This faith from the manager paid off, as Barnes-Homer scored five goals in the opening three games of the 2010–11 season, including a hat-trick away against Kettering Town. He fell out of favour with new Luton manager Gary Brabin towards the end of the season, being used primarily as a substitute, including in the club's play-off final defeat to AFC Wimbledon. Barnes-Homer ended the season as Luton's top scorer with 19 goals, 16 of which came in the league.

He started Luton's first game of the 2011–12 season, though was substituted after an hour. On 25 August 2011, Barnes-Homer joined League One side Rochdale on loan until January 2012, making only five league appearances in five months. He left Luton on 1 January 2012, his contract terminated by mutual consent. On the decision to terminate Barnes-Homer's contract, Luton manager Gary Brabin stated "I just felt from the beginning of the season that it wasn't going to work out, that's why we decided to loan him to Rochdale. It hasn't worked out for him there and I didn't feel it was going to be right for him to come back."

On 24 February 2012, Barnes-Homer joined Conference North side Nuneaton Town. He made only one appearance for the club in the Birmingham Senior Cup before leaving on 20 March to join Swedish third division side Östersunds FK. He played in 11 league games, scoring twice, before returning to England on 27 June to sign for Macclesfield Town in the Conference Premier.

On 5 January 2013, he scored both goals late on in a third round FA Cup tie for Macclesfield against Championship leaders Cardiff City in a 2–1 victory, putting his team through to the fourth round for the first time.

Having netted 21 times in league and cup competitions in the 2012–13 season for Macclesfield, he trialled with League One side Notts County but failed to earn a deal. On 27 July 2013, he featured for Conference Premier side Alfreton in a pre-season friendly and just two days later he played over an hour for Forest Green Rovers in their friendly clash with Yeovil Town. After another trial appearance against Weston-super-Mare, he signed a two-year contract with Forest Green on 5 August 2013. He made a goal scoring debut for the club on 10 August 2013 in an 8–0 win against Hyde. In January 2014, just six months into his two-year contract, he moved on a free transfer to Forest Green's league rivals Cambridge United. On 28 February, Barnes-Homer joined Tamworth on loan. The following day he was selected in the starting eleven against FC Halifax Town which Cambridge drew 1–1 despite dominating for longer periods. Cambridge released Barnes-Homer on 27 May 2014.

Barnes-Homer joined AFC Telford United in 2017, later taking a coaching position with the club. In October 2021, Barnes-Homer joined Southern League Premier Division Central side Stourbridge on a dual-registration basis.

On 24 March 2022, Barnes-Homer signed for Southern League Premier Division Central side Bromsgrove Sporting.

On 3 June 2022, Bromsgrove Sporting confirmed that Barnes-Homer, along with teammates Tom Taylor and Miro Pais had all agreed deals to stay with the club for the 2022–23 season.

In March 2024, Barnes-Homer joined Hednesford Town.

== International career ==
Barnes-Homer was named in the England C squad that played Poland under-23's on 17 November 2009. He scored the winning goal on his debut in a 2–1 victory. On 9 February 2011, Barnes-Homer scored the winning goal in a 1–0 win against Belgium under-23s that put England C into the final of the International Challenge Trophy.

== Coaching career ==
In September 2023, Barnes-Homer joined Havant & Waterlooville as assistant manager, reuniting with manager Steve King whom he had worked with at Gloucester City.

In December 2023, Barnes-Homer along with King were sacked by the club.
