= Zdeněk Kroča =

Czech footballer

Personal information
- Date of birth: 29 September 1980 (age 46)
- Place of birth: Zlín, Czechoslovakia
- Height: 1.94 m (6 ft 4 1/2 in)
- Position: Defender

Team information
- Current team: RAK Provodov

Youth career
- 1986–2000: FC Tescoma Zlín

Senior career*
Years	Team	Apps	(Gls)
2000–2010	FC Tescoma Zlín	189	(16)
2006–2007	→ Sportfreunde Siegen (loan)	7	(1)
2010–2011	Luton Town	45	(5)
2011–2012	Kilmarnock	14	(1)
2012–2014	FC Fastav Zlín	45	(4)
2014–2015	Uherský Brod		
2015	Hulín		
2015–2016	USC Altenwörth		
2016–2017	SCU Kottes		
2017–	RAK Provodov		
- * Club domestic league appearances and goals as of 14:05, 29 November 2012 (GMT)

Zdeněk Kroča (born 29 September 1980) is a Czech footballer who plays for FC Fastav Zlín as a defender.

== Career ==
Born in Zlín, Zlín Region, Kroča started his career as a youth player for FC Tescoma Zlín and was promoted to the senior side in 2000. He started his first game for Zlín in the 2002–03 Gambrinus liga season, and went on to play 104 league games until the end of the 2005–06 season as the club consolidated themselves in the Gambrinus liga.

Kroča was linked to a move to then-Slovak Superliga champions Artmedia Bratislava in January 2006. He played on trial in a friendly game, though Artmedia opted against signing him, stating he was too similar to players already at the club.

He joined German Regionalliga Süd side Sportfreunde Siegen on loan for the start of the 2006–07 season, playing in seven matches and scoring once.

Kroča signed a new contract with Zlín the next season, once again becoming a regular in the team. Zlín were relegated to the Czech 2. Liga at the end of the 2008–09 season. He stayed at the club for one more year before his contract ended.

He signed for English Conference Premier team Luton Town on 4 August 2010 on a one-year contract following a successful trial period. He scored on his competitive Luton debut in a 2–1 victory over Altrincham. He then scored two further goals in the opening weeks of the season against Newport County and AFC Wimbledon.

Kroča signed for Scottish Premier League side Kilmarnock when his Luton contract expired on 30 June 2011. Kroča made his SPL debut on Sunday 24 July 2011 in a 1–1 draw against Dundee United at Tannadice Park. Kroča scored his first goal for Kilmarnock in a 3–2 win against Dunfermline Athletic at Rugby Park on 10 September 2011. On 18 March, he played in the 2012 Scottish League Cup Final which Kilmarnock won after beating Celtic 1–0.

Kroča returned home to the Czech Republic and on 2 July 2012 signed a two-year contract with the club he had spent most of his career at, FC Fastav Zlín.

== Honours ==
Kilmarnock

- Scottish League Cup: 2012
