= Pavel Besta =

Czech football player

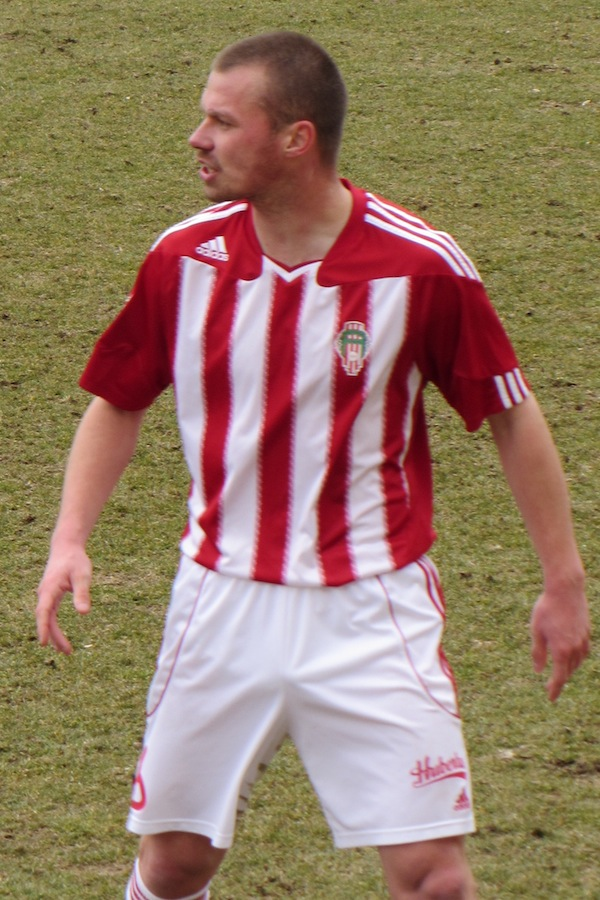

Personal information
- Date of birth: 2 September 1982 (age 44)
- Place of birth: Ostrava, Czechoslovakia
- Height: 1.83 m (6 ft 0 in)
- Position: Defensive midfielder

Youth career
- 1998–2000: Baník Ostrava

Senior career*
Years	Team	Apps	(Gls)
2000–2007	Baník Ostrava	163	(0)
2007–2009	Viktoria Žižkov	37	(0)
2010	Ružomberok	13	(0)
2010–2011	Luton Town	6	(0)
2012–2013	Viktoria Žižkov	25	(0)
2013–2014	Sandecja Nowy Sącz	2	(0)
2015	Viktorie Jirny		
2015–2016	SK Union 2013		
2016	Bohemians Prague		
2016–2017	SK Třeboradice		
2017–2019	SK Rakovník		
2019–2020	FK Seko Louny		
2020–2021	Spartak Kbely		

International career
1997–1998	Czech Republic U15	3	(0)
1998–1999	Czech Republic U16	16	(1)
1999–2000	Czech Republic U17	13	(4)
2000–2001	Czech Republic U18	14	(3)
2001–2002	Czech Republic U20	7	(0)
2002–2003	Czech Republic U21	7	(0)
- * Club domestic league appearances and goals

Pavel Besta (born 2 September 1982) is a Czech former professional footballer player who played as a defensive midfielder.

== Club career ==
Besta started football career in his native Ostrava at local side Baník Ostrava. He was a member of Baník's 2003–2004 season title-winning squad. The next season, Ostrava played in the third qualifying round of the UEFA Champions League. Besta played two matches against Bayer 04 Leverkusen. Baník then played in the first round of the UEFA Cup, with Besta playing in both legs of the 4–1 aggregate defeat to English Premier League side Middlesbrough. During that season, he also won the Czech Cup with Baník.

In 2007, he moved to Viktoria Žižkov, where he spent two seasons. In his second season, Besta was part of the team that saw Žižkov relegated to the Czech 2. Liga.

In January 2010, Besta moved to Slovakia to play for Slovak Superliga side MFK Ružomberok. At the time of the transfer, he had played over 200 games in the Czech Gambrinus liga. He played 13 times for Ružomberok as they finished the season in fifth place.

Following his release from Ružomberok, Besta joined English Conference Premier side Luton Town on an initial trial period. He signed a one-year contract in August 2010 after impressing in a friendly against Newcastle United. However, he did not impress when he had a full-time contract, being the target of abuse from Luton fans following an error which led to a goal in a league game against Tamworth which Luton went on to lose 3–1. After just nine appearances, Besta was released from his contract with Luton in January 2011.

== International career ==
Besta played for the Czech Republic youth national teams from under-15 level. He played five matches for the U-20 national team at the 2001 FIFA World Youth Championship in Argentina. Between 2002 and 2003, Besta played seven times for the Czech Republic under-21 team.

== Honours ==
Baník Ostrava

- Czech First League: 2003–04
- Czech Cup: 2004–05
