= Sol Davis =

English footballer (born 1979)

Personal information
- Full name: Sol Sebastian Davis
- Date of birth: 4 September 1979 (age 47)
- Place of birth: Cheltenham, England
- Height: 5 ft 8 in (1.73 m)
- Position: Left back

Team information
- Current team: Kettering Town

Senior career*
Years	Team	Apps	(Gls)
1997–2002	Swindon Town	116	(0)
2002–2009	Luton Town	199	(3)
2007	→ Peterborough United (loan)	0	(0)
2009–2010	Milton Keynes Dons	10	(0)
2009–2010	→ Kettering Town (loan)	3	(0)
2010–2012	Kettering Town	58	(0)
2012	Arlesey Town		
2015	Warminster Town		
- * Club domestic league appearances and goals

Sol Sebastian Davis (born 4 September 1979) is an English former professional Footballer who played as a left-back.

== Career ==
Born in Cheltenham, Gloucestershire, Davis is a left-back who played over 130 times for Swindon Town before being transferred to Luton Town in August 2002, bought by then manager Joe Kinnear.

Davis was named Players' Player of the Year following the club's League One winning campaign in 2004–05 in which Davis scored twice – his first ever goals in professional football.

At the beginning of the 2007–08 season, Davis found himself out of favour with new Luton boss Kevin Blackwell and was subsequently placed on the transfer list. Davis joined League Two side Peterborough United on a two-month loan on 24 September 2007, but returned to Luton in early October due to injury. After Blackwell's departure, Davis was immediately recalled to the side by new manager Mick Harford, but could not prevent Luton's relegation to League Two.

In the 2008–09 season, Davis made 24 league appearances for Luton as the Hatters were relegated out of The Football League. He was not offered a new contract at the end of the year, and was released on 27 May 2009. Davis played a total of 229 games in all competitions for Luton over the course of seven seasons, and was a highly popular player with the fans at Kenilworth Road.

On 17 July 2009, Davis joined Grimsby Town on trial. Later that day he played in the club's 3–2 South West Challenge Cup victory over Yeovil Town.

In August 2009 he signed short-term contract with Milton Keynes Dons.

Following that, in November 2009, he joined Kettering Town on loan by appointment of manager-player Lee Harper, alongside MK Dons midfielder Ritchie Partridge.

Along with 3 other players he was released by MK Dons at the end of his contract on 30 June 2010.

One day later, Davis signed permanently on a two-year contract for Kettering.

In the summer of 2012, Davis spent pre-season training with Hinckley United playing in several friendly games.

Davis joined up with former teammates Shane Blackett and Nathan Abbey at Southern League side Arlesey Town in 2012.

== Stroke ==
On 28 October 2006, it was revealed that Davis had suffered a stroke whilst travelling to his team's match at Ipswich Town on the next day. He was taken into the specialist unit at Addenbrookes Hospital in Cambridge. The squad had been on their way to the Belstead Brook hotel in Ipswich on Saturday when Davis lost feeling in his left side and this was affecting his speech. Davis however returned to action and started in the game against Cardiff City on 1 January 2007.

== Honours ==
Luton Town

- Football League One: 2004–05
- Football League Trophy: 2008–09
