= Fred Murray =

Irish footballer and physiotherapist

Personal information
- Full name: Frederick Anthony Murray
- Date of birth: 22 May 1982 (age 44)
- Place of birth: Clonmel, County Tipperary, Ireland
- Position: Defender

Youth career
- Belvedere
- Blackburn Rovers

Senior career*
Years	Team	Apps	(Gls)
2000–2002	Blackburn Rovers	0	(0)
2001–2002	→ Cambridge United (loan)	13	(0)
2002–2004	Cambridge United	75	(0)
2004–2007	Northampton Town	38	(0)
2007–2008	Stafford Rangers	16	(0)
2008	Stevenage Borough	13	(0)
2008–2009	Exeter City	6	(0)
2009–2010	Grays Athletic	0	(0)
2009–2010	→ Luton Town (loan)	17	(0)
2010–2012	Luton Town	51	(1)
Total		230	(2)
- * Club domestic league appearances and goals as of 16:06, 3 August 2011 (UTC)

Frederick Anthony "Fred" Murray (born 22 May 1982, Clonmel, County Tipperary) is an Irish former footballer and physiotherapist.

== Playing career ==
Murray played his youth football at Belvedere before going abroad. At Belvedere he played in the same team as Wes Hoolahan. Murray began his career as a trainee at Premier League side Blackburn Rovers, though he never made a first-team appearance. An initial loan period at Second Division club Cambridge United was turned permanent in March 2002, as the U's signed Murray on a free transfer from Blackburn. Murray's three seasons at the club, in which he made over 100 appearances, saw Cambridge relegated to the Third Division.

He signed a three-year contract for League Two side Northampton Town for an undisclosed fee in July 2004, but his tenure at the club was blighted by serious injuries, including an infected Achilles tendon. In both the 2005–06 and 2006–07 seasons, Murray did not play a single minute of football. He was released in May 2007, but was invited to still train with the club.

After an unsuccessful trial with Leyton Orient, Murray joined Conference Premier side Stafford Rangers on 28 August 2007, making his debut in a 2–1 defeat at Oxford United. He then joined Peter Taylor's Stevenage Borough team on a short-term contract in the January 2008 transfer window, and narrowly missed out on a place in the Conference play-offs. After his release from Stevenage, he trained with League Two side Exeter City before signing for them, once more on a short-term deal. He left Exeter on 8 May 2009, after just 6 appearances for the club.

At the start of the 2009–10 season, Murray signed for Grays Athletic along with eight other players. After a change in management at Grays, Murray left the club less than a week after joining them, signing for Luton Town on a six-month loan deal on 11 August 2009. He made his debut for Luton on the same day, in a 4–1 home victory over Manfield Town. On 13 January 2010, with his loan deal expired, Murray signed an 18-month contract with Luton.

Murray continued to be a regular fixture at left-back for Luton, though he missed parts of the 2010–11 season due to injury, including Luton's penalty shootout loss to AFC Wimbledon in the Conference Premier play-off final.

On 12 July 2011, he signed a new contract with the club. On 10 November 2011, Murray was deregistered as a Luton player to allow him to focus on recovering from a serious knee injury which had seen him take no part in Luton's 2011–12 season. The club signed Darlington defender Greg Taylor as a replacement. In July 2012, Luton manager Paul Buckle confirmed that Murray had left the club. Murray (speaking in 2020) confirmed that, despite his injury troubles, his time at Luton was the most enjoyable of his career.

== Physiotherapy career ==
Murray sustained a career-ending injury at the age of 28. His last game, away to York City for Luton in the Conference in April 2011 (a month before his 29th birthday) saw him stretchered from the field of play. He trained as a physiotherapist at the University of Salford. On his transition from football to physiotherapy, Murray has said: "I never had any interest in playing again as I fell in love with physio, I filled the void that football had given me and I was ready for a change. I walked from one career into another and studying physio was the best thing I ever did".

Murray took up a position with QPR. Harry Redknapp promoted him from an academy role to the first team, where he worked during the club's time in the Premier League. His first medical was Charlie Austin. Though he has spoken well of his time working with Redknapp, Murray became disillusioned with the politics of football. He parted ways with QPR.

Murray then founded the London-based Remedy clinic among whose clinets have been rock star Dave Grohl and numerous athletes, including "a French international, a World Cup winner" whom Murray declined to name. Murray does not discuss his clients. His work with Grohl (whom Murray spent about six months with following a 2015 broken leg) became public knowledge after the rock star thanked him in media interviews in 2017 and even dedicated a song to Murray on stage at a 2019 RDS show. Murray said in 2020: "I had offers from Premier League clubs to go in as physio over the last few years but there is no job that would bring me back there as the work I do now [with Remedy] is the way I want to work with a client, if that's an athlete or anyone, we treat them the way they should be treated".

== Honours ==
Cambridge United

- Football League Trophy runner-up: 2001–02
