= Lewis Emanuel =

Footballer (born 1983)

Personal information
- Full name: Lewis James Emanuel
- Date of birth: 4 October 1983 (age 43)
- Place of birth: Bradford, England
- Positions: Left-back; left winger

Youth career
- 1999–2001: Bradford City

Senior career*
Years	Team	Apps	(Gls)
2001–2006	Bradford City	139	(4)
2006–2010	Luton Town	79	(5)
2007	→ Brentford (loan)	3	(0)
Total		221	(9)

International career
2006	Republic of Ireland B	1	(0)
- * Club domestic league appearances and goals

Lewis James Emanuel (born 4 October 1983) is a former professional footballer who played as a left back or as a left midfield. He played for Bradford City, Luton Town and Brentford. He retired in 2010 having played more than 200 games. Born in England, he made one appearance for the Republic of Ireland B national team. Three years after finishing his playing career, Emanuel was jailed for eight years for his part in an armed robbery.

== Career ==
Born in Bradford, West Yorkshire, Emanuel went to the city's Hanson School, and started his career as a trainee with Bradford City. He made his senior debut for them on 21 August 2001 in a League Cup victory over Macclesfield Town. He played five seasons at Bradford, making a total of 139 league games, during which he scored four goals, before turning down the offer of a new contract at the end of the 2005–06 season.

Emanuel subsequently signed for Championship side Luton Town on a free transfer on 21 July 2006. He scored his first goal for the club in a 1–0 victory at Sheffield Wednesday in August 2006. On 14 November 2006, he played for the Republic of Ireland B international squad during a 0–0 friendly tie with Scotland B.

After relegation to League One, new Luton manager Kevin Blackwell preferred his own signings Alan Goodall and Darren Currie to Emanuel. Indeed, under Blackwell's regime, he played just two games, neither in the league. On 25 October 2007, he joined Brentford in a one-month loan deal, which was then extended for a second month. During his loan spell he missed a League Two game on 4 December 2007 against Morecambe after claiming that he got lost on the M25.

Later that season it was reported that Emanuel had joined Lincoln City on loan, but the deal was cancelled as Luton entered administration. This led to the sale of several players, and the resultant lack of playing staff meant that Luton required Emanuel's services.

In July and August 2008, Emanuel played in pre-season friendlies on trial with Birmingham City and Southend United. However, Emanuel remained at Kenilworth Road in the 2008–09 season, for which Luton had been deducted 30 points. Emanuel helped Luton to reach zero points when he scored in a 2–2 draw with Chester City in January, although he was substituted in the first half due to injury. The injury was diagnosed as a ruptured medial ligament, which was expected to rule him out for the rest of the season. Emanuel was limited to just 14 games for Luton during the season because of injury problems. However, he returned to training earlier than expected and featured for Luton's reserves in March and back into the first team against Aldershot Town later the same week. A month after his return, Emanuel was part of Luton's Football League Trophy-winning team; they defeated Scunthorpe United 3–2 after extra time in the final at Wembley Stadium.

Out of contract at Luton, who were now relegated from The Football League after failing to overcome the points deduction, Emanuel began the search for a new club. He had a trial at Oldham Athletic, and turned down a contract offer from Grimsby Town – managed by his previous coach at Luton, Mike Newell. He instead re-signed for Luton on 31 July 2009, stating he had "unfinished business to attend to". However, a broken toe sustained in the opening day of the season left Emanuel out of action for over three months. His return in December 2009 lasted just one game before his toe injury was once more aggravated, and he did not play again during the season.

Emanuel was given the opportunity to return to pre-season training in for the 2010–11 campaign and prove his fitness. However, he failed to report for the training sessions and was consequently released from Luton in early July 2010. He joined Barrow on trial shortly after his release, though was not offered a contract due to impending surgery on his toe injury.

== Jail sentence ==
On 1 June 2013, Emanuel was arrested on suspicion of armed robbery at a post office in Skelmanthorpe, West Yorkshire. He was later charged and remanded in custody on 15 June. In December 2013 Emanuel was sentenced to eight years in prison having pleaded guilty to robbery and possession of an imitation firearm.

== Honours ==
Luton Town

- Football League Trophy: 2008–09
