= Claude Gnakpa =

French footballer (born 1983)

Personal information
- Full name: Johouri Claude Gnakpa
- Date of birth: 9 June 1983 (age 43)
- Place of birth: Marseille, France
- Positions: Striker; winger

Youth career
- 1998–2001: Montpellier

Senior career*
| Years | Team | Apps | (Gls) |
| 2001–2002 | Marignane | | |
| 2002–2003 | Beaucaire | 20 | (0) |
| 2003–2005 | Racing Santander B | 35 | (2) |
| 2005–2006 | Alavés B | 20 | (1) |
| 2006 | FC Vaduz | 4 | (0) |
| 2007 | Swindon Town | 0 | (0) |
| 2007–2008 | Peterborough United | 29 | (0) |
| 2008–2011 | Luton Town | 107 | (22) |
| 2011–2012 | Walsall | 20 | (1) |
| 2012 | Inverness Caledonian Thistle | 7 | (0) |
| 2012–2013 | Al-Minaa | 12 | (6) |
| 2013–2014 | Salgaocar | 8 | (2) |
| Total | | 262 | (34) |
- * Club domestic league appearances and goals

Claude Gnakpa Johouri (born 9 June 1983) is a French footballer who played as a striker. Besides France, he played in Spain, Switzerland, Spain, Scotland, Iraq, and India.

Beginning his career as a trainee at Montpellier HSC, Gnakpa then played for French lower league sides before moving to Spain in 2003 to play in the reserve teams of La Liga sides Racing de Santander and Alavés. In 2006, he moved to Switzerland for a short time to play for top-tier club FC Vaduz. He moved to England in 2007 to play for Swindon Town, though never made an appearance. He subsequently signed for Peterborough United, where he was used as a defender, then for Luton Town on a free transfer in 2008. At Luton, Gnakpa received notability for scoring the winning goal in the club's 2009 Football League Trophy Final victory, securing Luton's first success in the competition. Since the 2009–10 season, Gnakpa has been utilised almost solely in a wide position, using his combination of pace, power and crossing to contribute numerous goals and assists. After he received the March player of the month, Gnakpa was named in the Conference Premier team of the season for 2009–10. Gnakpa left Luton at the end of his contract in July 2011, signing for League One side Walsall.

== Career ==
Gnakpa was born in Marseille, Bouches-du-Rhône. He began as a youth player for Montpellier, then appeared for local sides Marignane and Beaucaire, before moving abroad to play for Racing de Santander B, Deportivo Alavés B and FC Vaduz. In March 2007, Gnakpa was signed on transfer deadline day by Swindon Town boss Paul Sturrock on a short-term contract. Gnakpa failed to play for Swindon's first team, appearing only as an unused substitute in several matches, before he was released at the end of the season.

In July 2007, Peterborough United manager Darren Ferguson took Gnakpa on trial. He was eventually signed by the club. The "Flying Frenchman" was quickly made a regular at London Road and with his notoriously strong tackle and terrifying pace he cemented his place in the team.

In May 2008, it was reported that Gnakpa had rejected Peterborough's offer of an improved contract following the side's promotion to League One, and would instead search for another club. Reportedly, Gnakpa harboured interested from Championship side Sheffield Wednesday, League Two outfit Luton Town, and Scottish Premier League side Aberdeen.

He joined the Hatters prior to the start of the 2008–09 campaign, with the club starting League Two on an unprecedented −30 points. Gnakpa scored his first goal for the Hatters in a 2–1 home defeat to Darlington on 11 October 2008. He scored the only goal of the game in Luton's Football League Trophy area semi-final victory over Colchester United on 16 December 2008.

On 5 April 2009, Gnakpa came on as a substitute and scored an extra-time winner as Luton defeated Scunthorpe United 3–2 to win the Football League Trophy final at Wembley Stadium. In that game he was used as a winger, a position where he then played regularly during the 2009–10 season under Harford's successor, Richard Money.

On 20 March 2010, Gnakpa scored a hat-trick in a 6–1 win over Ebbsfleet United, then continued his scoring streak with three goals in the next two games. His good form saw him awarded the Conference Premier Player of the Month award for March. In June 2010, Gnakpa was named in the Conference Premier team of the season.

Gnakpa continued his form into the next season, scoring 15 goals as Luton finished third in table, securing a play-off place.

On 1 July 2011, Gnakpa's contract with Luton ended, and he subsequently signed a one-year deal with League One side Walsall.

On 27 January 2012, Gnakpa signed for Scottish Premier League club Inverness Caledonian Thistle on a short-term contract. Walsall manager Dean Smith said that it was best to move on as Gnakpa wanted more first team appearances. Inverness manager Terry Butcher said that he was delighted he had signed him and that he was pleased to sign him after previously failing to.

He was released by Inverness in April having failed to make much of an impact during his stay.

On 5 August 2013, it was announced that Gnakpa has signed for I-League side Salgaocar.

== Honours ==
Luton Town

- Football League Trophy: 2008–09
