= 2008–09 Football League Trophy =

Tournament details
- Country: England; Wales
- Teams: 48

Final positions
- Champions: Luton Town
- Runners-up: Scunthorpe United

The 2008–09 Football League Trophy, known as the 2008–09 Johnstone's Paint Trophy for sponsorship reasons, is the 28th Football League Trophy, a knockout competition for English football clubs in Leagues One and Two, the third and fourth tiers of English football. Luton Town won the competition, beating Scunthorpe United 3–2 after extra time in the final. However, Luton were unable to defend their trophy as they were relegated from the Football League at the end of the season.

The format was the same as that which had been used since 1996, with four first round regions; North-West, North-East, South-West and South-East and a two-region format from the second round; North and South. The resulting regional winners then meet in the final.

== First round ==
The First Round draw was conducted on 16 August 2008. The teams to be granted byes to the Second Round were drawn first, with the remaining teams drawn for the First Round ties. The First Round matches were played in the week commencing 1 September 2008.

=== Northern Section ===
Tie no	Home team	Score	Away team	Attendance
North-West
1	Oldham Athletic	1–1	Morecambe	2,016
Morecambe won 5 – 4 on penalties
2	Crewe Alexandra	3–0	Macclesfield Town	2,463
3	Stockport County	1–0	Port Vale	2,290
4	Tranmere Rovers	1–0	Accrington Stanley	2,410
North-East
5	Chesterfield	2–2	Grimsby Town	1,665
Grimsby Town won 4 – 1 on penalties
6	Scunthorpe United	2–1	Notts County	1,755
7	Leeds United	2–1	Bradford City	20,128
8	Hartlepool United	0–3	Leicester City	2,807

=== Southern Section ===
Tie no	Home team	Score	Away team	Attendance
South-West
1	Bournemouth	3–0	Bristol Rovers	2,220
2	Brentford	2–2	Yeovil Town	1,339
Brentford won 4 – 2 on penalties
3	Exeter City	1–2	Shrewsbury Town	1,530
4	Aldershot Town	2–2	Swindon Town	1,814
Swindon Town won 7 – 6 on penalties
South-East
5	Millwall	0–1	Colchester United	2,456
6	Northampton Town	0–1	Brighton & Hove Albion	2,047
7	Southend United	2–4	Leyton Orient	3,499
8	Dagenham & Redbridge	4–2	Barnet	1,412

=== First round byes ===
==== Northern section ====
Bury, Carlisle United, Chester City, Darlington, Lincoln City, Rochdale,
Rotherham United, Huddersfield Town.

==== Southern section ====
Cheltenham Town, Gillingham, Hereford United, Luton Town, Milton Keynes Dons, Peterborough United, Walsall, Wycombe Wanderers.

== Second round ==
The Second Round draw was conducted on 6 September 2008, with matches played in the week commencing 6 October 2008.

=== Northern Section ===
Tie no	Home team	Score	Away team	Attendance
1	Tranmere Rovers	1–0	Crewe Alexandra	2,626
2	Rochdale	2–2	Carlisle United	1,608
Rochdale won 4 – 2 on penalties
3	Chester City	1–1	Morecambe	926
Morecambe won 3 – 1 on penalties
4	Bury	1–0	Stockport County	2,384
5	Scunthorpe United	2–1	Grimsby Town	4,844
6	Rotherham United	4–2	Leeds United	4,658
7	Darlington	1–0	Huddersfield Town	1,791
8	Leicester City	0–0	Lincoln City	8,046
Leicester City won 3 – 1 on penalties

=== Southern Section ===
Tie no	Home team	Score	Away team	Attendance
1	Cheltenham Town	1–2	Walsall	1,741
2	Hereford United	1–2	Swindon Town	1,458
3	Wycombe Wanderers	0–7	Shrewsbury Town	1,730
4	Milton Keynes Dons	0–1	Bournemouth	4,329
5	Peterborough United	0–1	Dagenham & Redbridge	2,644
6	Brighton & Hove Albion	2–2	Leyton Orient	2,157
Brighton & Hove Albion won 5 – 4 on penalties
7	Gillingham	0–1	Colchester United	1,557
8	Luton Town	2–2	Brentford	2,029
Luton Town won 4 – 3 on penalties

== Area quarter-finals ==
The draw for the area quarter-finals was conducted on 11 October 2008. The matches were played in the week commencing 3 November 2008, with the exception of the match between Brighton & Hove Albion and Swindon Town, which was played on 12 November 2008.

=== Northern Section ===
Tie no	Home team	Score	Away team	Attendance
1	Rotherham United	2–0	Leicester City	4,255
2	Tranmere Rovers	1–0	Morecambe	2,110
3	Darlington	1–0	Bury	1,651
4	Scunthorpe United	1–0	Rochdale	2,474

=== Southern Section ===
Tie no	Home team	Score	Away team	Attendance
1	Shrewsbury Town	5–0	Dagenham & Redbridge	2,747
2	Brighton & Hove Albion	2–0	Swindon Town	2,234
3	Walsall	0–1	Luton Town	1,844
4	Bournemouth	0–1	Colchester United	2,275

== Area semi-finals ==
The draw for the area semi-finals was conducted on 8 November 2008, and matches were played in the week commencing 15 December 2008.

=== Northern Section ===
Tie no	Home team	Score	Away team	Attendance
1	Scunthorpe United	2–1	Tranmere Rovers	2,669
2	Rotherham United	1–1	Darlington	2,706
Rotherham United won 4 – 2 on penalties

=== Southern Section ===
Tie no	Home team	Score	Away team	Attendance
1	Luton Town	1–0	Colchester United	2,638
2	Shrewsbury Town	0–0	Brighton & Hove Albion	4,052
Brighton & Hove Albion won 5 – 4 on penalties

== Area finals ==
The area finals, which serve as the semi-finals for the entire competition, are contested over two legs, home and away. The first legs were played on 20 January 2009; the second legs were played on 17 February 2009.

=== Northern Section ===
20 January 2009
19:30

Scunthorpe United	2–0	Rotherham United
Woolford 60'; Pearce 67'	Report

Glanford Park, Scunthorpe
Attendance: 6,038
Referee: Clive Oliver (Northumberland)

17 February 2009
19:45

Rotherham United	0–1	Scunthorpe United
	Report	Hooper 74'

Don Valley Stadium, Sheffield
Attendance: 6,555
Referee: Kevin Friend (Leicestershire)

Scunthorpe United won 3–0 on aggregate.

=== Southern Section ===
20 January 2009
19:45

Brighton & Hove Albion	0–0	Luton Town
	Report

Withdean Stadium, Brighton and Hove
Attendance: 6,127
Referee: Paul Taylor (Hertfordshire)

17 February 2009
19:45

Luton Town	1–1	Brighton & Hove Albion
Craddock 1'	Report	Forster 20'
Penalties
Martin (penalty scored); Craddock (penalty scored); Hall (penalty scored); Charles (penalty scored)	4–3	(penalty scored) Forster; (penalty scored) Virgo; (penalty scored) Elphick; (penalty missed) Jarrett; (penalty missed) Birchall

Kenilworth Road, Luton
Attendance: 8,711
Referee: Andy D'Urso (Essex)

Brighton & Hove Albion 1–1 Luton Town on aggregate. Luton Town won 4–3 on penalties.

== Final ==
5 April 2009
13:15 BST

Luton Town	3–2 (a.e.t.)	Scunthorpe United
Martin 32'; Craddock 70'; Gnakpa 95'	Report	Hooper 14'; McCann 88'

Wembley Stadium, London
Attendance: 55,378
Referee: Phil Crossley (Kent)
