= 2009–10 Luton Town F.C. season =

English football club season

Luton Town
2009–10 season
- Chairman: Nick Owen
- Manager: Mick Harford (until 1 October 2009); Alan Neilson (caretaker manager from 1 October 2009 to 30 October 2009); Richard Money (from 30 October 2009)
- Conference Premier: 2nd (Play-off semi-finals)
- FA Cup: Third round
- FA Trophy: First round
- Top goalscorer: League: Tom Craddock (23); All: Tom Craddock (24)
- Highest home attendance: 9,781 vs York City (Conference Premier Play-off semi-final, 3 May 2010)
- Lowest home attendance: 2,518 vs Rotherham United (FA Cup second round replay, 8 December 2009)
- Average home league attendance: 6,578
| Home colours | Away colours |

The 2009–10 season was the 124th season in the history of Luton Town Football Club. Luton's 23rd-place finish in the 2006–07 Football League Championship and 24th-place finishes in the 2007–08 Football League One and 2008–09 Football League Two meant that the club competed in the Conference Premier for the first time in its history, and in a division outside of the Football League for the first time since the beginning of their second spell as a member in 1920. Although tipped as favorites for the title and promotion before the season had even begun, the club struggled to immediately adapt to life in the new division, ultimately costing manager Mick Harford his job. Richard Money was appointed as the new manager soon after, eventually leading the club to an unbeaten run of 14 games towards the end of the season that propelled them to a second-place finish in the league. However, defeat in the play-off semi-finals to York City meant Luton was to remain in the Conference for the 2010–11 season.

This article covers the period from 1 July 2009 to 30 June 2010.

== Background ==
After a chaotic 2007–08 season, Luton Town's situation went from bad to worse when it emerged that, due to financial irregularities, they would start the 2008–09 season with a 20-point deduction from the Football League on top of a 10-point deduction from the Football Association for matters concerning transfers of players under the previous board. As the club only exited administration two days before the start of the season, manager Mick Harford needed to rebuild the squad from scratch. Six new players were in the starting line-up for the first game of the season, and throughout the campaign loan and non-contracted players were drafted in and out of the squad. As a result of this instability, the players never settled sufficiently to gain the results required. In the end, relegation was inevitable, though some consolation was taken from victory in the Football League Trophy final at Wembley Stadium. Since Luton were no longer in the Football League, and thus no longer eligible for the competition, the club applied to defend their title during 2009–10. The request was denied on 15 June, causing the club to consider an appeal.

== Review ==
=== Pre-season ===
Luton Town competed in the South West Challenge Cup during July, and were drawn to play against Bideford and Wycombe Wanderers in Group C. However, a waterlogged pitch caused the Wycombe game to be cancelled, and Luton were given passage into the semi-finals based on having a higher goal difference than Wycombe. Luton beat Exeter City 3–2 in the semi-final, setting up the final against Grimsby Town. Grimsby, though, refused to play in the final due to safety concerns over a 6:00 pm kick-off time, and no compromise with the tournament organisers could be reached. As a result, Belgian club Montegnée, originally knocked out in the group stages, were invited to play in the final at Grimsby's expense. Luton went on to win the South West Challenge Cup with a 3–1 victory over Montegnée.

Friendlies were arranged against St Neots Town, Hitchin Town (as a Luton XI), Spalding United (as a Luton XI), Swindon Town, Peterborough United, Manchester United, Biggleswade Town in the Bedfordshire Premier Cup (as a Luton XI), and Hampton & Richmond.

On 8 July, it was announced that four players had not been offered new contracts, and were therefore released from the club. Ian Henderson was the only senior player to be released, along with three youth team players – Riccardo Biggi, Mark Farthing and Harry Hogarth.

On 22 July, Luton signed Shane Blackett on a two-year contract from Peterborough United. The transfer was funded from the proceeds of a friendly with Peterborough, which took place on 25 July. Five days later, Luton-born defender Callum Reynolds signed on loan from Portsmouth until January.

On 29 July, striker Drew Talbot joined Chesterfield on a free transfer after failing to agree a new contract at Luton. The next day, defender Ian Roper signed for Kettering Town on a free transfer.

Luton revealed new kits for the coming season on 30 July, reverting the home strip back to the orange colours that the club used primarily in the 1970s. A new two-year shirt sponsorship deal was announced with easyJet, whose headquarters are located at the nearby London Luton Airport.

=== August ===
On 6 August, striker Steve Basham penned a one-year contract with the club, and one day later, goalkeeper Shane Gore signed a one-month contract, acting as cover for Mark Tyler.

Luton began life in non-league football with a 1–1 draw away to AFC Wimbledon. Tom Craddock scored an early penalty before Wimbledon pegged Luton back with a penalty of their own late on, which saw Shane Blackett sent off on his debut.

On 11 August, with the news that left-back Lewis Emanuel was to be sidelined for three months with a broken toe sustained in the game at Kingsmeadow, Luton signed Grays Athletic defender Fred Murray on a six-month loan deal. Murray started in the team on the same day in Luton's first home game of the season – a 4–1 victory over Mansfield Town that saw centre-back George Pilkington score his first two goals for the club. Luton continued with victories over Gateshead and Forest Green Rovers, before labouring to a 0–0 home draw with Chester City. Long-term injuries to forwards Ryan Charles and Liam Hatch left Luton short on attacking options, resulting in striker George Donnelly signing on a one-month loan from Plymouth Argyle on 28 August. Luton ended August unbeaten with a draw at Kettering Town, placing them third in the table.

=== September ===
Luton secured a fourth consecutive clean sheet with a 3–0 victory over Crawley Town at Kenilworth Road, keeping in touch with early league leaders Oxford United and Mansfield Town.

A poor run of form throughout the rest of September saw Luton pick up just seven points from six games – including away losses at Oxford and Wrexham, the latter of which manager Mick Harford described as "the worst performance in Luton Town's history". A brief respite was found in an extraordinary comeback victory over Cambridge United. Losing 2–0 at half-time and with a man sent off, Luton rallied to a 4–3 win by full-time, Kevin Gallen scoring twice. However, just three days later, Luton suffered a home defeat after a lifeless performance to local rivals Stevenage Borough.

Peterborough United striker Ben Wright signed on a one-month loan on 29 September, boosting Luton's attacking options in the wake of further injuries and suspensions.

=== October ===
On 1 October, manager Mick Harford parted company as the club's manager by mutual consent. Luton were 13 points from the top of the table and, in a club statement, managing director Gary Sweet admitted that results and performances were not up to the standards expected at the beginning of the season. First-team coach Alan Neilson was named caretaker manager until a replacement for Harford could be found. Neilson's first game ended in a 2–1 victory over Tamworth.

Neilson continued on an unbeaten run of five matches, including an FA Cup victory over Grays Athletic, until Luton appointed former Walsall boss Richard Money as permanent manager on 30 October. Neilson continued working at the club as Money's assistant manager and former Cambridge United manager Gary Brabin was named as the club's chief scout. Luton lost their second home game of the season the next day, Rushden & Diamonds inflicting a 2–0 defeat with two late goals.

=== November ===
The month began with a thrilling 3–3 draw at home to League Two side Rochdale in the FA Cup on 7 November, resulting in a replay at Spotland four days later. Luton won the tie 2–0 to set up a second round encounter with Rotherham United.

Richard Money made his first signings a day later – experienced Notts County goalkeeper Kevin Pilkington signed on a one-month loan to act as cover for the injured Mark Tyler, whilst striker Mark Nwokeji was drafted in on loan until January 2010 from Dagenham & Redbridge. Both players made their debuts in a 2–0 win over Grays Athletic on 14 November. A 2–2 home draw with Cambridge United the next week saw Luton let in two late goals; a game that could have ended in a loss had Kevin Pilkington not saved a penalty. The scheduled game against Mansfield Town on 24 November was postponed due to a waterlogged pitch at Field Mill.

On 26 November, the day of the loan transfer deadline, Coventry City winger Ashley Cain was signed for one month. Midfielder Andy Burgess, who was signed only in May 2009 and had made 10 appearances for the club, joined promotion rivals Mansfield Town on an initial one-month loan with a permanent transfer arranged for January 2010. In a busy day of transfer dealing, striker Steve Basham, sparsely used since his arrival in the summer, completed a two-month loan to Hayes & Yeading United. Luton signed Kidderminster Harriers' top scorer Matthew Barnes-Homer on a two-and-a-half-year contract for a five-figure fee, with the permanent transfer taking place in January 2010. Barnes-Homer would play until then on loan, with young Luton striker Ryan Charles heading to Kidderminster on loan for one month as part of the deal.

Two days later, Luton drew 2–2 in the FA Cup with Rotherham United, once more forcing a replay in the competition.

=== December ===
A 1–0 home defeat to Kettering Town on 2 December, followed by a 0–0 draw to Chester City three days later, resulted in Luton finding themselves in seventh place in the table and four points off of a play-off position, albeit with two games in hand over some teams.

On 8 December, Luton beat League Two side Rotherham United 3–0 in an FA Cup second round replay at Kenilworth Road, setting up a third round encounter at League One side Southampton. Four days later, Cambridge United knocked Luton out of the FA Trophy with a 3–1 win at the Abbey Stadium.

A series of postponements to games due to snow and ice left a sparse fixture list for the rest of the month, with Luton's only other game resulting in a 4–1 victory over Eastbourne Borough on 28 December, Matthew Barnes-Homer scoring his first goal for the club.

=== January ===
Luton were knocked out of the FA Cup by Southampton, a side two leagues higher, on 2 January in a narrow 1–0 defeat.

On 5 January, with the transfer window now open, Luton signed young St Albans City players Jonathan O'Donnell and Godfrey Poku on 18-month contracts. O'Donnell had previously spent time in the youth set-up at Luton's local rivals Watford and Milton Keynes Dons, while Poku was highly rated by St Albans manager Steve Castle. On 30 January, the two players were loaned back to St Albans for a period of one month.

Further postponements due to the adverse weather meant Luton had played just one league game in seven weeks, leaving a further 23 games to be played in three months. In contrast, the first 23 league games had been played over a period of five months.

Experienced trio Kevin Nicholls, Alan White and Kevin Gallen were placed on the transfer list by Richard Money on 12 January. White joined his previous club Darlington on loan for the rest of the season three days later. Midfielder Keith Keane, who had started his career with Luton, was placed on the transfer list on 15 January. Keane's refusal to sign a new contract, which would expire at the end of the season and effectively mean he would leave the club on a free transfer, was cited as the reason. Striker Mark Nwokeji, meanwhile, extended his loan agreement with Luton until the end of the season, while the permanent transfers of Matthew Barnes-Homer and Fred Murray, who had both previously been playing for the club on loan, were confirmed.

On 22 January, York City winger Craig Nelthorpe signed for Luton on loan for the rest of the season. He made his debut one day later as a substitute in a 1–0 victory over Gateshead – Luton's first game in 21 days.

Hungarian central defender János Kovács was signed on a free transfer from Lincoln City on 26 January. Kovács signed a five-month contract until the end of the season. He started in the team, and scored the opening goal, in a 2–0 win over Histon a day later. This game also saw Liam Hatch make his first appearance in nearly four months upon his return from an ankle injury.

Luton fell to their fourth home defeat of the season with a 3–2 loss against Ebbsfleet United on 30 January, Hatch scoring his first goal for the club.

=== February ===
A busy February period of six games in three weeks started with a 1–0 away win over Barrow, Hatch once again scoring. A 2–1 win over league leaders Oxford United was secured on 9 February, with Luton scoring both goals in added time – the winner was scored by captain Keith Keane direct from a corner in the last minute of the game, which propelled the club into the play-off positions for the first time since early November. Keane was then sent off for celebrating the goal with Luton fans. This game also saw the highest turnout at Kenilworth Road in over two seasons, with 8,860 fans in attendance. Four days later, Luton won a third consecutive game with a 1–0 away victory over Eastbourne Borough, an Asa Hall strike from 25 yards proving the match winner.

Luton's ten-game unbeaten away record in the league continued with a 0–0 draw at their promotion rivals York City on 16 February, pushing the club up to fourth place in the table. The club's poor league form at Kenilworth Road, in which only three games out of ten had ended in Luton winning, continued with a fifth home defeat – a 2–1 loss to AFC Wimbledon. Tom Craddock scored his tenth goal of the season for Luton, making him the top scorer at the club. A loss to Crawley Town left Luton in fifth place in the table, and also saw the club's record-equalling run of away form come to an end.

=== March ===
The backlog of postponed games from the winter period meant Luton were to play 8 games over March. This began with a 0–0 draw away to Mansfield Town on 2 March, with a 3–2 victory over Hayes & Yeading United coming four days later.

A last minute winner from Tom Craddock in a 2–1 victory over Forest Green Rovers on 9 March propelled Luton to third place in the table, the club's highest position since early September.

On 12 March 2010, Luton signed midfielder Simon Heslop from Championship side Barnsley on a 28-day emergency loan. He played in a 1–0 victory over Wrexham a day later as Luton kept their first home clean sheet since September 2009. A third home game in a row on 16 March resulted in a 3–1 victory over Kidderminster Harriers, Kevin Gallen scoring twice.

Luton recorded their biggest win of the season on 20 March, with a 6–1 victory away at Ebbsfleet United. Winger Claude Gnakpa scored a hat-trick in the club's biggest victory since a 5–0 win over Bristol City in 2005.

Richard Money added two players to the squad before the loan and free transfer deadline on 25 March. Kenyan international striker Taiwo Atieno, who started his career when Money was manager of Walsall and had most recently played football in the US, was signed on a free transfer until the end of the season. Defender Gavin Caines was signed on loan until the end of the season from Kidderminster Harriers, where he had been a regular member of the squad.

Luton's 6–1 winning result the previous week was then bettered with an emphatic 8–0 home victory over Hayes & Yeading United on 27 March. The club's run of goals continued three days later with a 4–0 win against Salisbury City, their seventh consecutive victory.

Luton's good form during the month did not go unnoticed, with Richard Money claiming the March Conference Manager of the Month award, and Claude Gnakpa named as Player of the Month.

=== April ===
Luton, who were at this point second in the table, faced a key clash with league leaders Stevenage Borough on 3 April. Luton secured a 1–0 win at Broadhall Way in a tightly contested game, Matthew Barnes-Homer scoring the winning goal just moments after his introduction as a substitute, and inflicted Stevenage's first home defeat since November 2008. Luton were now only two points behind Stevenage, though the leaders had a game in hand. A ninth consecutive victory was assured two days later as Luton beat already relegated side Grays Athletic 6–0 at Kenilworth Road, with Kevin Gallen scoring the first hat-trick of his career.

Luton's nine game-winning run was halted on 10 April with a 1–1 draw away to Tamworth, which saw the club fall to four points behind leaders Stevenage. However, Luton's scoring form soon returned in a 6–3 home win against Histon three days later – a game that marked Tom Craddock's first senior hat-trick.

A 0–0 home draw on 17 April with Altrincham, coupled with Stevenage's victory over Kidderminster that led to them being crowned as Conference Premier champions, meant that Luton's only hope of promotion was now through the play-offs.

The last league game of the season on 24 April resulted in a 1–1 draw with play-off rivals Rushden & Diamonds, which meant Luton ended the season with a second-place finish. Results elsewhere left Luton to play York City in the two-legged play-off semi-final on 29 April and 3 May.

Luton lost the first leg at Bootham Crescent 1–0, an 89th-minute goal from Richard Brodie leaving them having to win the return game to have any chance of playing in the final.

=== May ===
Another 1–0 defeat in the home leg knocked Luton out of the play-offs, condemning them to at least another season in the Conference Premier.

The clear out of players began on 7 May as Luton prepared for their second season in the division. Four players – Steve Basham, Shane Gore, Asa Hall and Rossi Jarvis – were released from their contracts, while a further four – Gavin Caines, Liam Hatch, Craig Nelthorpe and Mark Nwokeji – left the club as their loan period had ended. As well as the changes to playing staff, the coaching staff were also subject to restructuring in the wake of the season ending. Chief scout Gary Brabin was promoted to the role of assistant manager, replacing Alan Neilson. Neilson was instead appointed to a coaching and youth development role, while first-team coach Kevin Watson left the club.

Luton made their first signing of the season on 19 May, with Cambridge United defender Dan Gleeson making the move to Kenilworth Road on a free transfer. Goalkeeper and former loanee Kevin Pilkington signed a permanent one-year contract a day later, having been released from Notts County. Striker Danny Crow, who had finished the season as Cambridge United's top scorer, signed on a free transfer on 21 May, penning a two-year contract.

Luton were also boosted by Player of the Year George Pilkington and 18-goal striker Kevin Gallen signing contract extensions.

On 27 May, Luton announced they were to sign Stevenage midfielder Andy Drury, who had played 30 league games during the season as the club claimed the Conference title, on a two-year contract beginning from 1 July 2010.

Striker Ryan Charles and defender George Beavan were released from the club on 31 May.

=== June ===
On 9 June, midfielder Keith Keane signed a new two-year contract. On 28 June, defender János Kovács left the club and signed for Hereford United on a two-year contract.

== Match results ==
Luton Town results given first.

=== Legend ===
| Win | Draw | Loss |

=== Pre-season ===
==== South West Challenge Cup ====
| Round | Date | Opponent | Venue | Result | Attendance | Scorers | Notes |
|---|---|---|---|---|---|---|---|
| Group C | 15 July 2009 | Bideford | Away | 3–0 | 513 | Craddock (2), Talbot | |
| Group C | 17 July 2009 | Wycombe Wanderers | Neutral | Cancelled | – | – | |
| Semi-final | 18 July 2009 | Exeter City | Neutral | 3–2 | 532 | Hatch, Craddock, Talbot | |
| Final | 19 July 2009 | Montegnée | Neutral | 3–1 | 331 | Craddock, own goal, Hall | |

==== Friendlies ====
| Date | Opponent | Venue | Result | Attendance | Scorers | Notes |
|---|---|---|---|---|---|---|
| 10 July 2009 | St Neots Town | Away | 3–1 | 864 | White, Newton, Hunter | |
| 21 July 2009 | Swindon Town | Home | 0–1 | 1,524 | – | |
| 22 July 2009 | Hitchin Town | Away | 0–1 | 340 | – | Luton XI |
| 25 July 2009 | Peterborough United XI | Home | 3–0 | 1,598 | Craddock, Hall, Watkins | |
| 25 July 2009 | Spalding United | Away | 4–1 | 89 | Walker (2), Williams (2) | Luton XI |
| 28 July 2009 | Manchester United XI | Home | 1–2 | 7,480 | Hall | |
| 29 July 2009 | Biggleswade Town | Away | 2–2 | 289 | Mkoloma, Barker | Luton XI; Bedfordshire Premier Cup Final^{[A]} |
| 1 August 2009 | Hampton & Richmond | Away | 0–1 | 397 | – | |

=== Conference Premier ===
| Pos | Team | Pld | W | D | L | GF | GA | GD | Pts | Promotion, qualification or relegation |
|---|---|---|---|---|---|---|---|---|---|---|
| 1 | Stevenage Borough (C, P) | 44 | 30 | 9 | 5 | 79 | 24 | +55 | 99 | Promotion to Football League Two |
| 2 | Luton Town | 44 | 26 | 10 | 8 | 84 | 40 | +44 | 88 | Qualification for the Conference Premier play-offs |
| 3 | Oxford United (O, P) | 44 | 25 | 11 | 8 | 64 | 31 | +33 | 86 | Qualification for the Conference Premier play-offs |
| 4 | Rushden & Diamonds | 44 | 22 | 13 | 9 | 77 | 39 | +38 | 79 | Qualification for the Conference Premier play-offs |
| 5 | York City | 44 | 22 | 12 | 10 | 62 | 35 | +27 | 78 | Qualification for the Conference Premier play-offs |

Source: Football Conference
Rules for classification: 1) points; 2) goal difference; 3) number of goals scored.
(C) Champions; (O) Play-off winners; (P) Promoted

| Date | Opponent | Venue | Result | Attendance | Scorers | Notes |
|---|---|---|---|---|---|---|
| 8 August 2009 | AFC Wimbledon | Away | 1–1 | 4,488 | Craddock (pen) | |
| 11 August 2009 | Mansfield Town | Home | 4–1 | 7,295 | Pilkington (2), own goal, Craddock (pen) | |
| 15 August 2009 | Gateshead | Home | 2–1 | 6,829 | Hall, Gallen | |
| 18 August 2009 | Forest Green Rovers | Away | 1–0 | 1,805 | Craddock | |
| 22 August 2009 | Chester City | Home | 0–0 | 6,563 | – | ^{[B]} |
| 29 August 2009 | Kettering Town | Away | 0–0 | 3,266 | – | |
| 1 September 2009 | Crawley Town | Home | 3–0 | 6,389 | Pilkington (2), Craddock | |
| 5 September 2009 | Salisbury City | Away | 1–1 | 2,044 | Gallen | |
| 8 September 2009 | Oxford United | Away | 0–2 | 10,613 | – | |
| 12 September 2009 | Barrow | Home | 1–0 | 6,264 | Newton | |
| 22 September 2009 | Wrexham | Away | 0–3 | 3,448 | – | |
| 26 September 2009 | Cambridge United | Away | 4–3 | 4,870 | Gallen (2), Jarvis, Howells | |
| 29 September 2009 | Stevenage Borough | Home | 0–1 | 8,223 | – | |
| 3 October 2009 | Tamworth | Home | 2–1 | 6,297 | Hall, Wright | |
| 10 October 2009 | Kidderminster Harriers | Away | 2–1 | 2,927 | Newton, Charles | |
| 17 October 2009 | Altrincham | Away | 1–0 | 1,762 | Craddock (pen) | |
| 20 October 2009 | York City | Home | 1–1 | 6,387 | Hall | |
| 31 October 2009 | Rushden & Diamonds | Home | 0–2 | 7,101 | – | |
| 14 November 2009 | Grays Athletic | Away | 2–0 | 1,668 | Craddock, Gallen | |
| 21 November 2009 | Cambridge United | Home | 2–2 | 7,458 | Gnakpa, Craddock | |
| 2 December 2009 | Kettering Town | Home | 0–1 | 6,608 | – | |
| 5 December 2009 | Chester City | Away | 0–0 | 1,352 | – | ^{[B]} |
| 28 December 2009 | Eastbourne Borough | Home | 4–1 | 6,646 | Barnes-Homer, Gallen (2), Jarvis | |
| 23 January 2010 | Gateshead | Away | 1–0 | 1,218 | Own goal | |
| 27 January 2010 | Histon | Away | 2–0 | 1,543 | Kovács, Hall | |
| 30 January 2010 | Ebbsfleet United | Home | 2–3 | 6,658 | Hatch, Craddock | |
| 6 February 2010 | Barrow | Away | 1–0 | 1,579 | Hatch | |
| 9 February 2010 | Oxford United | Home | 2–1 | 8,860 | Pilkington, Keane | |
| 13 February 2010 | Eastbourne Borough | Away | 1–0 | 2,018 | Hall | |
| 16 February 2010 | York City | Away | 0–0 | 3,316 | – | |
| 20 February 2010 | AFC Wimbledon | Home | 1–2 | 7,736 | Craddock | |
| 27 February 2010 | Crawley Town | Away | 1–2 | 2,118 | Barnes-Homer | |
| 2 March 2010 | Mansfield Town | Away | 0–0 | 3,407 | – | |
| 6 March 2010 | Hayes & Yeading | Away | 3–2 | 1,881 | Hatch, Gnakpa (pen), Craddock | |
| 9 March 2010 | Forest Green Rovers | Home | 2–1 | 5,884 | Craddock (2) | |
| 13 March 2010 | Wrexham | Home | 1–0 | 6,538 | Craddock | |
| 16 March 2010 | Kidderminster Harriers | Home | 3–1 | 5,908 | Howells, Gallen (2) | |
| 20 March 2010 | Ebbsfleet United | Away | 6–1 | 1,923 | Gnakpa (3), Gallen, Craddock, Barnes-Homer | |
| 27 March 2010 | Hayes & Yeading | Home | 8–0 | 6,761 | Gallen (2), Gnakpa (2), Keane, Craddock (2), Howells | |
| 30 March 2010 | Salisbury City | Home | 4–0 | 6,692 | Gnakpa, Craddock, Howells, Heslop | |
| 3 April 2010 | Stevenage Borough | Away | 1–0 | 7,024 | Barnes-Homer | |
| 5 April 2010 | Grays Athletic | Home | 6–0 | 7,860 | Craddock (2), Gallen (3), Hatch | |
| 10 April 2010 | Tamworth | Away | 1–1 | 2,246 | Pilkington | |
| 13 April 2010 | Histon | Home | 6–3 | 7,083 | Howells (2), Craddock (3), Gallen | |
| 17 April 2010 | Altrincham | Home | 0–0 | 7,374 | – | |
| 24 April 2010 | Rushden & Diamonds | Away | 1–1 | 4,820 | Craddock | |

==== Conference Premier play-offs ====
| Round | Date | Opponent | Venue | Result | Attendance | Scorers | Notes |
|---|---|---|---|---|---|---|---|
| Semi-final First Leg | 29 April 2010 | York City | Away | 0–1 | 6,204 | – | |
| Semi-final Second Leg | 3 May 2010 | York City | Home | 0–1 | 9,781 | – | |

=== FA Cup ===
| Round | Date | Opponent | Venue | Result | Attendance | Scorers | Notes |
|---|---|---|---|---|---|---|---|
| Fourth qualifying round | 24 October 2009 | Grays Athletic | Home | 3–0 | 2,721 | Blackett, own goal, Hall | |
| First round | 7 November 2009 | Rochdale | Home | 3–3 | 3,167 | Basham (2), Newton | |
| First round replay | 11 November 2009 | Rochdale | Away | 2–0 | 1,982 | Gallen (2) | |
| Second round | 28 November 2009 | Rotherham United | Away | 2–2 | 3,210 | Craddock (pen), Nwokeji | |
| Second round replay | 8 December 2009 | Rotherham United | Home | 3–0 | 2,518 | Newton, White, Gnakpa | |
| Third round | 2 January 2010 | Southampton | Away | 0–1 | 18,786 | – | |

=== FA Trophy ===
| Round | Date | Opponent | Venue | Result | Attendance | Scorers | Notes |
|---|---|---|---|---|---|---|---|
| First round | 12 December 2009 | Cambridge United | Away | 1–3 | 1,665 | Own goal | |

== Player statistics ==
Correct as of 3 May 2010. Players with a zero in every column only appeared as unused substitutes.

| No. | Pos. | Name | League* | | FA Cup | | FA Trophy | | Total | | Discipline | |
| No. | Pos. | Name | Apps | Goals | Apps | Goals | Apps | Goals | Apps | Goals | Yellow card | Red card |
|---|---|---|---|---|---|---|---|---|---|---|---|---|
| 1 | GK | (England) Mark Tyler | 39 | 0 | 1 | 0 | 0 | 0 | 40 | 0 | 1 | 0 |
| 2 | DF | (England) Ed Asafu-Adjaye | 18 (2) | 0 | 2 (1) | 0 | 0 | 0 | 20 (3) | 0 | 2 | 0 |
| 3 | DF | (Republic of Ireland) Lewis Emanuel | 1 (1) | 0 | 0 | 0 | 0 (1) | 0 | 1 (2) | 0 | 0 | 0 |
| 4 | MF | (Republic of Ireland) Keith Keane | 35 | 2 | 3 | 0 | 1 | 0 | 39 | 2 | 9 | 1 |
| 5 | DF | (Hungary) János Kovács | 17 | 1 | 0 | 0 | 0 | 0 | 17 | 1 | 3 | 0 |
| 5 | DF | (England) Alan White | 16 | 0 | 5 | 1 | 1 | 0 | 22 | 1 | 4 | 0 |
| 6 | DF | (England) George Pilkington | 46 | 6 | 6 | 0 | 1 | 0 | 53 | 6 | 4 | 0 |
| 7 | MF | (Saint Kitts and Nevis) Adam Newton | 34 (3) | 2 | 5 (1) | 2 | 1 | 0 | 40 (4) | 4 | 4 | 1 |
| 8 | MF | (England) Kevin Nicholls | 22 | 0 | 4 | 0 | 1 | 0 | 27 | 0 | 5 | 1 |
| 9 | FW | (England) Liam Hatch | 10 (11) | 4 | 0 | 0 | 0 | 0 | 10 (11) | 4 | 8 | 1 |
| 10 | FW | (England) Tom Craddock | 42 (4) | 23 | 3 (2) | 1 | 0 (1) | 0 | 45 (7) | 24 | 7 | 0 |
| 11 | MF | (England) Andy Burgess | 5 (1) | 0 | 3 | 0 | 0 | 0 | 8 (1) | 0 | 0 | 0 |
| 11 | FW | (Kenya) Taiwo Atieno | 0 | 0 | 0 | 0 | 0 | 0 | 0 | 0 | 0 | 0 |
| 12 | DF | (England) Shane Blackett | 15 (10) | 0 | 5 | 1 | 1 | 0 | 21 (10) | 1 | 2 | 1 |
| 13 | GK | (England) Shane Gore | 0 (1) | 0 | 2 | 0 | 0 | 0 | 2 (1) | 0 | 0 | 0 |
| 14 | MF | (England) Asa Hall | 27 (6) | 5 | 3 (2) | 1 | 0 | 0 | 30 (8) | 6 | 1 | 0 |
| 15 | DF | (England) Jake Howells | 23 (10) | 6 | 3 (3) | 0 | 0 | 0 | 26 (13) | 6 | 1 | 0 |
| 16 | MF | (England) Rossi Jarvis | 21 (6) | 2 | 3 | 0 | 1 | 0 | 25 (6) | 2 | 2 | 1 |
| 17 | FW | (England) Ryan Charles | 0 (6) | 1 | 1 (1) | 0 | 0 | 0 | 1 (7) | 1 | 0 | 0 |
| 18 | DF | (France) Claude Gnakpa | 28 (9) | 8 | 3 (3) | 1 | 1 | 0 | 32 (12) | 9 | 6 | 0 |
| 19 | FW | (England) Steve Basham | 0 (5) | 0 | 1 | 2 | 0 | 0 | 1 (5) | 2 | 0 | 0 |
| 20 | FW | (England) Kevin Gallen | 32 (1) | 16 | 6 | 2 | 1 | 0 | 39 (1) | 18 | 2 | 0 |
| 21 | DF | (England) Callum Reynolds | 3 (2) | 0 | 1 | 0 | 0 | 0 | 4 (2) | 0 | 2 | 1 |
| 22 | FW | (England) George Donnelly | 0 (4) | 0 | 0 | 0 | 0 | 0 | 0 (4) | 0 | 0 | 0 |
| 22 | MF | (England) Craig Nelthorpe | 0 (8) | 0 | 0 | 0 | 0 | 0 | 0 (8) | 0 | 0 | 0 |
| 23 | DF | (Republic of Ireland) Fred Murray | 40 (2) | 0 | 3 | 0 | 1 | 0 | 44 (2) | 0 | 8 | 0 |
| 24 | FW | (England) Ben Wright | 4 (1) | 1 | 0 | 0 | 0 | 0 | 4 (1) | 1 | 0 | 0 |
| 24 | DF | (England) Gavin Caines | 0 | 0 | 0 | 0 | 0 | 0 | 0 | 0 | 0 | 0 |
| 25 | DF | (England) George Beavan | 0 | 0 | 0 | 0 | 0 | 0 | 0 | 0 | 0 | 0 |
| 26 | GK | (England) Kevin Pilkington | 7 | 0 | 3 | 0 | 1 | 0 | 11 | 0 | 1 | 0 |
| 27 | FW | (England) Mark Nwokeji | 0 (7) | 0 | 0 (2) | 1 | 0 | 0 | 0 (9) | 1 | 0 | 0 |
| 28 | MF | (England) Ashley Cain | 0 | 0 | 0 | 0 | 0 | 0 | 0 | 0 | 0 | 0 |
| 29 | FW | (England) Matthew Barnes-Homer | 8 (16) | 4 | 0 | 0 | 0 (1) | 0 | 8 (17) | 4 | 1 | 0 |
| 30 | MF | (England) Adam Watkins | 0 | 0 | 0 (1) | 0 | 0 | 0 | 0 (1) | 0 | 0 | 0 |
| 31 | FW | (England) Jordan Patrick | 0 | 0 | 0 | 0 | 0 | 0 | 0 | 0 | 0 | 0 |
| 32 | DF | (England) Jack Wood | 0 | 0 | 0 | 0 | 0 | 0 | 0 | 0 | 0 | 0 |
| 33 | MF | (England) Taylor Nathaniel | 0 | 0 | 0 (1) | 0 | 0 | 0 | 0 (1) | 0 | 0 | 0 |
| 34 | MF | (England) Sam Barker | 0 | 0 | 0 | 0 | 0 | 0 | 0 | 0 | 0 | 0 |
| 35 | MF | (England) Simon Heslop | 13 | 1 | 0 | 0 | 0 | 0 | 13 | 1 | 1 | 0 |
| 36 | DF | (England) Alex Lacey | 0 | 0 | 0 | 0 | 0 | 0 | 0 | 0 | 0 | 0 |
| 37 | MF | (England) Godfrey Poku | 0 | 0 | 0 | 0 | 0 | 0 | 0 | 0 | 0 | 0 |

- *The league column also includes play-off matches.

== Managerial statistics ==
Only competitive games from the 2009–10 season are included.
Correct as of 3 May 2010.

| Name | Nat. | From | To | Record | | | | | | | | Honours |
| Name | Nat. | From | To | PLD | W | D | L | GF | GA | GD | W% | Honours |
|---|---|---|---|---|---|---|---|---|---|---|---|---|
| Mick Harford | (England) | 16 January 2008 | 1 October 2009 | 12 | 6 | 3 | 3 | 17 | 13 | +4 | 50.0 | – |
| Alan Neilson (caretaker) | (Wales) | 1 October 2009 | 30 October 2009 | 5 | 4 | 1 | 0 | 9 | 3 | +6 | 80.0 | – |
| Richard Money | (England) | 30 October 2009 | Present | 36 | 19 | 8 | 9 | 72 | 35 | +37 | 52.8 | Conference Premier runners-up |
| Total | | | | 53 | 29 | 12 | 12 | 98 | 51 | +47 | 54.7 | Conference Premier runners-up |

== Awards ==
Awarded on 25 April 2010.

| Award | Name | No. | Pos. | Notes |
|---|---|---|---|---|
| Luton Town Supporters Club Player of the Year | (England) George Pilkington | 6 | DF | |
| Players' Player of the Year | (England) George Pilkington | 6 | DF | |
| Young Player of the Year | (England) Jake Howells | 15 | MF | |
| Internet Player of the Year | (England) George Pilkington | 6 | DF | |
| LTSC Junior Members' Player of the Year | (England) George Pilkington | 6 | DF | |
| Goal of the Season | (Republic of Ireland) Keith Keane | 4 | MF | ^{[F]} |

== Transfers ==
=== In ===
| Date | Player | From | Fee | Notes |
|---|---|---|---|---|
| 22 July 2009 | (England) Shane Blackett | Peterborough United | Free^{[C]} | |
| 6 August 2009 | (England) Steve Basham | Unattached | | |
| 7 August 2009 | (England) Shane Gore | Unattached | | |
| 5 January 2010 | (England) Jonathan O'Donnell | St Albans City | Free | |
| 5 January 2010 | (England) Godfrey Poku | St Albans City | Free | |
| 13 January 2010 | (England) Matthew Barnes-Homer | Kidderminster Harriers | Undisclosed^{[D]} | ^{[E]} |
| 13 January 2010 | (Republic of Ireland) Fred Murray | Grays Athletic | Free | |
| 26 January 2010 | (Hungary) János Kovács | Lincoln City | Free | |
| 23 March 2010 | (Kenya) Taiwo Atieno | Unattached | | |
| 19 May 2010 | (England) Dan Gleeson | Cambridge United | Free | |
| 20 May 2010 | (England) Kevin Pilkington | Notts County | Free | |
| 21 May 2010 | (England) Danny Crow | Cambridge United | Free | |

=== Out ===
| Date | Player | To | Fee | Notes |
|---|---|---|---|---|
| 8 July 2009 | (England) Riccardo Biggi | Released | | |
| 8 July 2009 | (England) Mark Farthing | Released | | |
| 8 July 2009 | (England) Ian Henderson | Ankaragücü | Free | |
| 8 July 2009 | (England) Harry Hogarth | Released | | |
| 29 July 2009 | (England) Drew Talbot | Chesterfield | Free | |
| 30 July 2009 | (England) Ian Roper | Kettering Town | Free | |
| 1 January 2010 | (England) Andy Burgess | Mansfield Town | Undisclosed | ^{[E]} |
| 7 May 2010 | (England) Steve Basham | Released | | |
| 7 May 2010 | (England) Shane Gore | Released | | |
| 7 May 2010 | (England) Asa Hall | Released | | |
| 7 May 2010 | (England) Rossi Jarvis | Released | | |
| 31 May 2010 | (England) George Beavan | Released | | |
| 31 May 2010 | (England) Ryan Charles | Released | | |
| 28 June 2010 | (Hungary) János Kovács | Hereford United | Free | |

=== Loans in ===
| Date | Player | From | End date | Notes |
|---|---|---|---|---|
| 27 July 2009 | (England) Callum Reynolds | Portsmouth | 19 January 2010 | |
| 11 August 2009 | (Republic of Ireland) Fred Murray | Grays Athletic | 13 January 2010 | |
| 28 August 2009 | (England) George Donnelly | Plymouth Argyle | 29 September 2009 | |
| 29 September 2009 | (England) Ben Wright | Peterborough United | 23 October 2009 | |
| 12 November 2009 | (England) Mark Nwokeji | Dagenham & Redbridge | 7 May 2010 | |
| 12 November 2009 | (England) Kevin Pilkington | Notts County | 12 February 2010 | |
| 26 November 2009 | (England) Matthew Barnes-Homer | Kidderminster Harriers | 13 January 2010 | ^{[E]} |
| 26 November 2009 | (England) Ashley Cain | Coventry City | 31 December 2009 | |
| 22 January 2010 | (England) Craig Nelthorpe | York City | 7 May 2010 | |
| 12 March 2010 | (England) Simon Heslop | Barnsley | 7 May 2010 | |
| 25 March 2010 | (England) Gavin Caines | Kidderminster Harriers | 7 May 2010 | |

=== Loans out ===
| Date | Player | To | End date | Notes |
|---|---|---|---|---|
| 17 August 2009 | (England) George Beavan | Grays Athletic | 19 December 2009 | |
| 26 November 2009 | (England) Steve Basham | Hayes & Yeading United | 7 May 2010 | |
| 26 November 2009 | (England) Andy Burgess | Mansfield Town | 1 January 2010 | ^{[E]} |
| 26 November 2009 | (England) Ryan Charles | Kidderminster Harriers | 28 December 2009 | |
| 15 January 2010 | (England) Alan White | Darlington | 7 May 2010 | |
| 30 January 2010 | (England) Jonathan O'Donnell | St Albans City | 26 February 2010 | |
| 30 January 2010 | (England) Godfrey Poku | St Albans City | 26 February 2010 | |

== See also ==
- List of Luton Town F.C. seasons

== Footnotes ==
A. Luton lost 4–1 in a penalty shootout.
B. Chester City were expelled from the Football Conference on 26 February 2010 for numerous rule breaches. After the club made a decision not to appeal, their results were expunged from the league on 8 March 2010, meaning Luton lost the 2 points gained from their matches with Chester. In addition, player appearance data for both games was wiped from the record.
C. Shane Blackett's transfer was funded from the proceeds of a friendly match between Luton Town and a Peterborough United XI on 25 July 2009.
D. The fee for the transfer of Matthew Barnes-Homer is believed to be a five-figure amount in the region of £75,000, though no official confirmation has yet been released.
E. Matthew Barnes-Homer's and Andy Burgess' transfers became permanent during the January transfer window. Until then, they played for the club they were joining on loan.
F. The goal of the season was chosen as Keith Keane's last minute winning goal direct from a corner on 9 February in a 2–1 victory against Oxford United.
