= 2008–09 Luton Town F.C. season =

English football club season

Luton Town
2008–09 season
- Chairman: Nick Owen
- Manager: Mick Harford
- Football League Two: 24th (relegated)
- FA Cup: Second round
- Football League Cup: Second round
- Football League Trophy: Winners
- Top goalscorer: League: Chris Martin (11); All: Chris Martin (13)
- Highest home attendance: 8,711 vs Brighton & Hove Albion (Football League Trophy, 17 February 2009)
- Lowest home attendance: 2,029 vs Brentford (Football League Trophy, 7 October 2008)
- Average home league attendance: 5,633
Home colours	Away colours	Third colours

The 2008–09 season was the 123rd season in the history of Luton Town Football Club. The team's 23rd-place finish in the 2006–07 Football League Championship and 24th-place finish in 2007–08 Football League One meant the club competed in League Two. The club was docked 30 points at the start of the season; 10 by The Football Association for irregular matters involving player transfers, and 20 by the Football League for breaking the rules on exiting administration. As a result, the club finished at the bottom of the league and was relegated to the Conference Premier. The season was not, however, without success – Luton beat Scunthorpe United 3–2 at Wembley to win the Football League Trophy for the first time.

This article covers the period from 1 July 2008 to 30 June 2009.

== Background ==
Kevin Blackwell's Luton team had a woeful 2007–08 season, due in no small part to the chaos behind the scenes at the club. Chairman David Pinkney, who had only months before taken over the club promising success, took the club into administration on 22 November 2007, stating he would fund the club's overheads. The club had ten points deducted as punishment. Meanwhile, an FA probe on transfer irregularities dragged on, described by Pinkney as "a storm in a teacup".

On 12 January, Kevin Blackwell and his assistants Sam Ellis and John Carver announced their intention to resign from the club on 9 February. This came after the administrator had sold captain Chris Coyne to Colchester United and midfielder David Edwards to Wolverhampton Wanderers for £350,000 and £675,000 respectively. Blackwell had managed to guide his team to an FA Cup replay against Liverpool at Anfield, which assisted financially, but failed to prevent further sales. On the same day as the replay at Anfield, 15 January, the administrator awarded "preferred bidder" status to Luton Town Football Club 2020, a consortium fronted by broadcaster and Luton Town supporter Nick Owen. 2020 loaned money to the club to keep them operating and, in return, were granted exclusive negotiation rights until the end of February 2008. Blackwell and his assistants were all sacked by the administrator on the same day, following a 5–0 defeat to Liverpool, to be replaced by former player Mick Harford, with Warren Neill installed as his assistant. On 26 February, the 2020 consortium had their bid for the club conditionally accepted by the administrator. This meant that they were now custodians of the club until the end of the season, and that the Football League would have to negotiate terms to return the Golden Share to Luton Town for the 2008–09 campaign.

Luton were relegated to League Two following a 2–1 home defeat to Brighton & Hove Albion on 12 April. The defeat left the Hatters rooted to the bottom of the table on 33 points, three points behind fellow strugglers Port Vale, who were also relegated on the same day. Luton lost all of their remaining league games and finished the season in bottom place and 17 points adrift of safety.

On 3 June, the FA's probe finally finished, and Luton were found guilty of 15 misconduct charges. The club was handed a ten-point deduction for the 2008–09 campaign, and a £50,000 fine. However, the situation soon went from bad to worse as, since the club had violated Football League rules by leaving administration without having made a Company Voluntary Arrangement with its creditors, the Football League only offered to return the Golden Share (that would allow the club to compete) to Luton on the condition that they play with a further twenty-point deduction. Luton appealed against the decision, but their appeal was thrown out. As a result, Luton Town began the 2008–09 season with an unprecedented −30 points, the biggest point deduction on record in the top four rungs of English football. The Hatters faced a mighty fight merely to avoid relegation from the Football League for the first time in their history.

== Review ==
=== Pre-season ===
Following the player sales in the previous season, Luton manager Mick Harford needed to practically rebuild his squad from scratch. A Football League-enforced transfer embargo that was in place until 48 hours before their first game of the season handicapped Harford further. Once the embargo was lifted on 8 August, the club signed nine players: former player Kevin Nicholls returned from a spell at Preston North End to captain the team; Claude Gnakpa joined from Peterborough United; Asa Hall signed from Birmingham City; George Pilkington arrived from Port Vale, and many others were signed including Michael Spillane and Chris Martin, both on season-long loans from Norwich City.

=== August and September ===
Luton made an indifferent start to the season, beating Plymouth Argyle in the League Cup, before going down 5–1 in the next round at Reading. By the end of September, Luton had reached −19 points in the league. This included an opening day home defeat to Port Vale, but narrow away victories over both Gillingham and Exeter City.

=== October ===
Luton's form soon slumped – after a draw away at Bradford City and a penalty shootout win over Brentford in the Football League Trophy, they lost two home games in a row. First Darlington inflicted defeat with a last minute winner in front of the Oak Road, then Luton were beaten 2–1 at home by Accrington Stanley in the first ever meeting between the two clubs.

Meanwhile, manager Mick Harford continued to try to regenerate the squad – Irish winger Garreth O'Connor was drafted in from free agency, as was former Coventry City forward Wayne Andrews. A spate of injuries did not help matters – talismanic captain Nicholls had not played since August, forward Sam Parkin was struggling with a recurring ankle injury, and defender Pilkington was out after becoming injured in early September. Harford introduced several younger players into the squad, including 16-year-old left-back Jake Howells from the youth team, 19-year-old Harry Worley on loan from Leicester City and 20-year-old striker Tom Craddock on loan from Middlesbrough.

Craddock made a big impact in his second game – scoring two goals in a 2–2 draw at Grimsby Town. Craddock earned and scored a penalty after Grimsby had taken an early lead, and then, deep into injury time, crashed the ball into the far corner from long range to secure a vital point for Luton. Luton Town history was made in this game as striker Jordan Patrick pulled on the number 29 shirt to become the club's youngest ever player – at 16 years and 7 days, Patrick came off the bench to set up Craddock's equaliser. Craddock scored again in a 2–1 win against Bury to quickly establish himself in the team. Parkin, one of the club's highest earners, returned from injury during this game, but failed to score. He was sent out on loan to Leyton Orient days later, with a view to a permanent deal. Three days later, a Tuesday night game against AFC Bournemouth at Kenilworth Road was abandoned after only eight minutes due to bad weather.

=== November ===
Luton's form was interrupted – a 3–0 annihilation followed that Saturday at Shrewsbury Town, putting a dent into Luton's charge for safety. A win in the Football League Trophy, against League One club Walsall, was the exception rather than the rule. Ahead of the next game, at home against Dagenham & Redbridge, Luton were boosted by the news that Craddock had extended his loan from Middlesbrough by a month. However, when Craddock injured his groin only days later, Luton were forced to bring in another striker – former Queens Park Rangers player Kevin Gallen was signed on loan for a month from MK Dons. Results did not improve, with consecutive losses to Rochdale and Brentford. An exit from the FA Cup followed, as Southend comfortably beat Luton 3–1 at Roots Hall.

=== December ===
December saw a revival in fortunes, as the Hatters went the entire month unbeaten. After a thrilling 3–3 draw at Kenilworth Road in the rescheduled game against Bournemouth, Luton beat Barnet 3–1. A 0–0 draw at top-of-the-table Wycombe Wanderers followed a week later, before Luton beat Colchester United in the Football League Trophy to earn a place in the Southern Area Final against Brighton & Hove Albion.

Craddock extended his loan from Middlesbrough by another month soon after. Luton's unbeaten run continued on Boxing Day; Ian Roper's goal six minutes into injury time sealing a point at Chesterfield. Two days later came a home win against Lincoln City, Roper scoring again after Martin had put Luton 2–0 ahead – the match finished 3–2. Luton were now only one point away from cancelling out their 30-point deduction.

=== January ===
Winger Ian Henderson, available as a free agent, signed on New Year's Day and Gallen's loan was also extended. To make room on the wage bill, O'Connor and Kevin Watson both left after short careers as Luton players. The club then had a bad run of results, including a 5–1 defeat at Darlington. Before the Darlington game, Luton signed Colchester United forward Akanni-Sunday Wasiu on loan for a month, while extending goalkeeper Conrad Logan's stay for a further month and signing Gallen on a permanent deal. Andrews was released soon after.

In the first leg of the Football League Trophy Southern Area Final on 20 January, Luton travelled to Brighton & Hove Albion and battled to a 0–0 draw, giving them a slight advantage for the second leg at Kenilworth Road. A controversial 3–3 draw with Bradford City saw both teams' managers, Mick Harford and Stuart McCall, and Luton captain Nicholls all set dates for FA hearings following a bizarre refereeing performance from Trevor Kettle.

Craddock signed an £80,000 permanent deal on 27 January, with Drew Talbot leaving for Chesterfield on loan to make room on the wage budget. Luton's poor run of league form continued.

=== February ===
A series of postponements due to adverse weather meant the club did not play for another two weeks and, when they did, they lost 2–1 to Dagenham & Redbridge.

17 February saw Brighton & Hove Albion return for the second leg of the Football League Trophy Southern Area Final. Luton took the lead after 59 seconds through Craddock, following a defensive mix-up. Brighton equalised with a Nicky Forster goal before David Livermore was sent off for a dangerous tackle on Spillane. Neither club made a breakthrough in the remainder of the match, which went to a penalty shoot-out. Luton's on-loan goalkeeper from Derby County, Lewis Price, saved from Jason Jarrett and Chris Birchall to take Luton into the final against Scunthorpe United on 5 April at Wembley Stadium. This appeared to have given Luton something of a confidence boost as they then went four games unbeaten in the league. Craddock scored again against Shrewsbury Town as Luton won 3–1, and carried on his scoring form over the next month.

=== March ===
The next major game was on 17 March against relegation rivals Grimsby Town. Grimsby boss Mike Newell, formerly manager of Luton Town, was suing the club for unfair dismissal. Newell received an angry reception, which turned to jeers when Hall scored a last minute winner to give Luton the three points.

Macclesfield Town then visited Kenilworth Road, and a Craddock penalty was enough to secure a 1–0 victory for Luton – the first time the club had secured two straight wins all season. Meanwhile, the club announced they had sold out their allocated 30,000 tickets for the Football League Trophy final almost immediately, and were given another 8,500 which went just as fast – setting a record for the most fans at Wembley Stadium from one club. However, Luton were told they would not be given any more due to "segregation issues". As a result, the final saw 40,000 Wembley seats empty.

26 March, loan deadline day, saw Luton bring in experienced midfielder David Livermore from Brighton & Hove Albion on a month's loan. Meanwhile, young striker Ryan Charles moved to Kettering Town on loan, also for a month. Two days later the Hatters travelled to Morecambe, unbeaten in twelve games. Goals from Martin and Gallen saw Luton beat Morecambe 2–1 and, in doing so, managed three straight wins for the first time since the 2004–05 League One winning season. Luton were now only eight points behind Chester City and with a game in hand. The match that Tuesday against Rotherham United, Luton's game in hand, could not have been more vital, but the Hatters ended up being defeated 4–2 and suffered a severe blow to their hopes of escaping relegation.

The FA hearings from the Bradford City game in January rolled around for Nicholls, Mick Harford and the club on 23 March – Harford was fined a total of £1,000, the club £2,000, and Nicholls £1,000. Nicholls was also handed a five-match ban to begin on 7 April – however, the club lodged an appeal against the ban on 31 March, delaying its effect until after the appeal was heard.

=== April ===
April began with the news that the club had won their case against former manager Mike Newell. Newell claimed that in his contract he had been entitled to 10% of any profit on players sold. However, his claim for £400,000 in unpaid transfer money was not upheld by a Football League panel on 31 March.

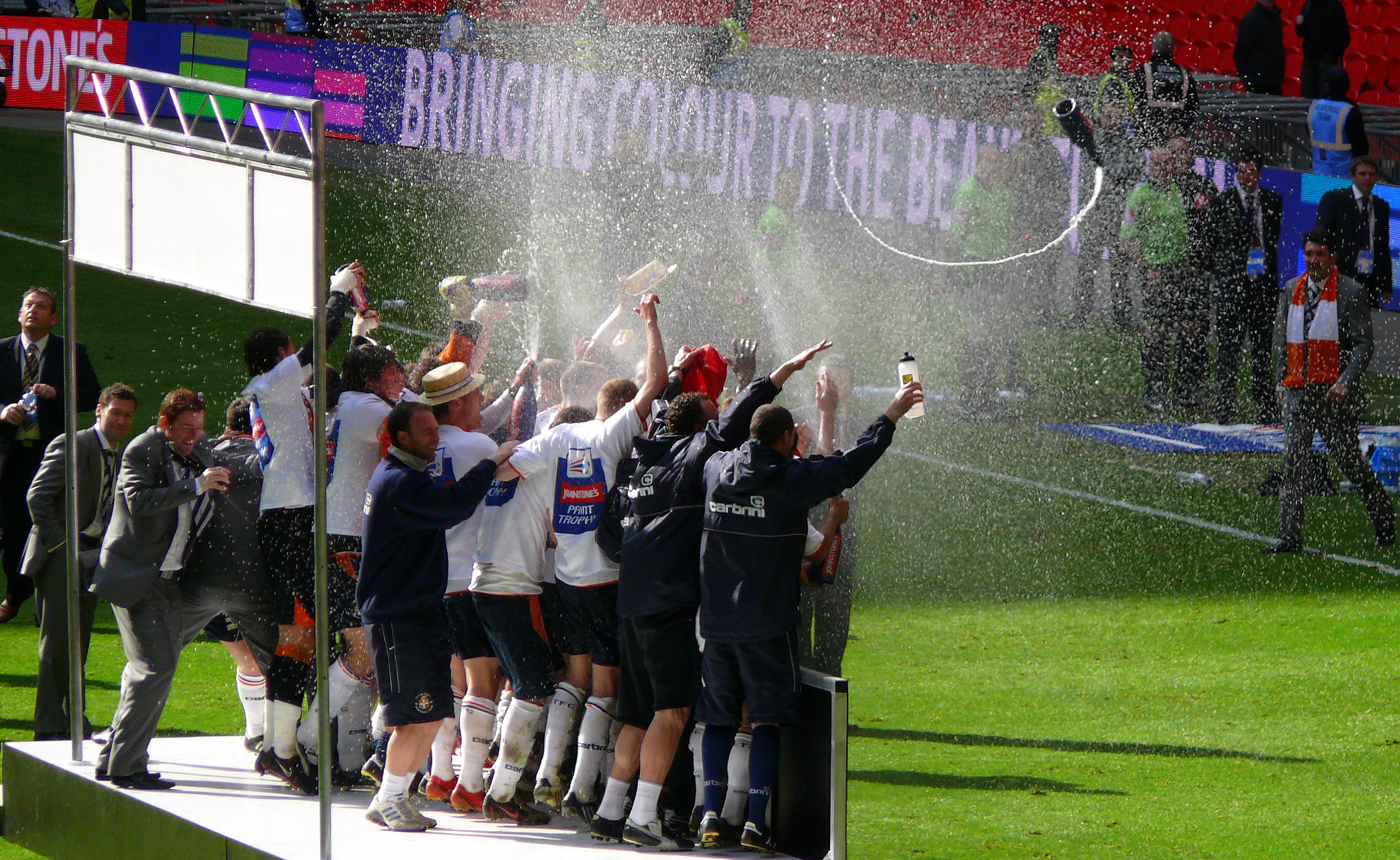
Luton Town staff celebrate winning the Football League Trophy.

5 April finally came, and Luton faced Scunthorpe United at Wembley Stadium in the Football League Trophy final as 40,000 Luton supporters converged on Wembley, dwarfing Scunthorpe's support of 13,000. Brian Mawhinney, Chairman of the Football League, was roundly booed by the Luton support before the game, in protest at the huge point deductions imposed at the start of the season. When the game got going, however, it was Scunthorpe who drew first blood in a pulsating match. Gary Hooper put Scunthorpe ahead early on with a low shot past Dean Brill. Craddock set up Martin with a superb cross a few minutes later, and Martin chested the ball down to shoot into the far corner to make it 1–1. In the second half, Craddock scored a half-volley from the edge of the box to make it 2–1, but Grant McCann forced extra time with a spectacular strike with only minutes left. Craddock was substituted and replaced by French defender Gnakpa, played in an unusually forward role by Mick Harford – it was a gamble which paid off, as Gnakpa ran onto a long ball from Keith Keane and got a touch that carried the ball over Joe Murphy and into the net, sending the supporters wild. Luton clung on, with man-of-the-match captain Nicholls at the centre of the game, and held on to win the match 3–2 and bring the Football League Trophy to Luton for the first time.

Only eight days later, Luton lost their League status – Lincoln City dealt another blow, as Luton were held to a 0–0 draw, and the final nail in the coffin came two days later as, on 13 April 2009, Luton Town were finally relegated from The Football League after a spell of 89 years. Chesterfield held Luton to a draw and, coupled with former Luton manager Mike Newell's Grimsby Town side winning, this meant the club's survival in the league became mathematically impossible to achieve.

I found out at five to five. I looked at the clock in the dressing room and said to the players: "Remember this time – five to five, on 13 April. This is the rebirth of Luton Town Football Club.

— Mick Harford, Manager, Luton Town

Relegation opened the question of whether Luton would be allowed to enter the Football League Trophy during the 2009–10 season. Luton soon submitted an application to the Football League, asking for special dispensation to defend their title.

A Rossi Jarvis goal saved a point at Barnet on 18 April. Nicholls was sent off late on for collecting two yellow cards, and Brill saved a penalty from former Hatter Paul Furlong. Wycombe Wanderers then came to Kenilworth Road, but despite Luton forcing pressure on the promotion contenders, Wycombe managed a goal on the break following an error by Sol Davis and Luton failed to find an equaliser. Luton's last home game in the Football League was a 1–1 draw with promotion chasers Rochdale, with Craddock scoring a penalty before Adam Rundle rescued a point for the visitors.

27 April saw the appeal against the Nicholls ban heard at the FA, and the decision was upheld, meaning that Nicholls would miss the match against Brentford on 2 May, as well as the first four games of the 2009–10 season. Two days later, long-serving club secretary Cherry Newbury, an employee since 1978, finally left by mutual consent after a period of suspension on full pay starting in January. Newbury had been secretary since 1994, and was implicated as the employee who drew The Football Association's attention to former directors paying agents through the club's holding company.

=== May and June ===
Luton Town bowed out of the Football League after 89 years with a 2–0 defeat at champions Brentford.

The first signing of the summer for Luton's time in non-League football was announced on 26 May, as lifelong Luton Town supporter Andy Burgess signed a two-year contract, joining from Rushden & Diamonds on a free transfer. The next day saw five players released – Parkin, Dean Morgan, Paul McVeigh, Davis and Brill all left as their contracts had ended. Adam Newton signed a two-year contract on 28 May following his release from Brentford, as regeneration of the squad continued. Gallen signed a new one-year deal the same day. Young defender Howells signed his first professional deal on 2 June. Three days later, Liam Hatch arrived on loan from Peterborough United for the 2009–10 season. Central defender Alan White rejoined Luton on 8 June, nine years after leaving in 2000.

On 15 June, the request to defend the Football League Trophy title was turned down. Experienced goalkeeper Mark Tyler signed a two-year deal two years later.

== Match results ==
Luton Town results given first.

=== Legend ===
Win	Draw	Loss

=== Friendlies ===
Date	Opponent	Venue	Result	Attendance	Scorers
12 July 2008	Boreham Wood	Away	4–2	300	McVeigh, Spring (2), Morgan
14 July 2008	Hitchin Town	Away	1–4	876	Hall
19 July 2008	Bedford Town	Away	3–0	1,133	Malcolm, Parkin, Broughton
22 July 2008	Leicester City	Home	1–1	1,934	Spring
24 July 2008	St Neots Town	Away	2–4	521	Sinclair, Quinn
26 July 2008	Northampton Town	Home	0–0	1,290	—
29 July 2008	Colchester United	Home	0–1	1,203	—
2 August 2008	Brighton & Hove Albion	Home	0–3	1,358	—

=== Football League Two ===
Date	Opponent	Venue	Result	Attendance	Scorers
9 August 2008	Port Vale	Home	1–3	7,149	Parkin
16 August 2008	Gillingham	Away	1–0	5,339	Parkin
23 August 2008	Notts County	Home	1–1	6,085	Martin
30 August 2008	Exeter City	Away	1–0	5,328	Parkin
6 September 2008	Macclesfield Town	Away	1–2	2,349	Charles
13 September 2008	Aldershot Town	Home	3–1	6,462	Spillane, Hall, Martin
20 September 2008	Rotherham United	Away	0–1	4,095	—
27 September 2008	Chester City	Home	1–1	5,731	Hall
4 October 2008	Bradford City	Away	1–1	13,083	Spillane
11 October 2008	Darlington	Home	1–2	5,560	Gnakpa
18 October 2008	Accrington Stanley	Home	1–2	5,492	Hall
21 October 2008	Grimsby Town	Away	2–2	4,021	Craddock (2)
25 October 2008	Bury	Away	2–1	3,052	Craddock, Roper
1 November 2008	Shrewsbury Town	Away	0–3	6,188	—
15 November 2008	Dagenham & Redbridge	Home	2–1	5,402	Davis, McVeigh
22 November 2008	Rochdale	Away	0–2	2,901	—
25 November 2008	Brentford	Home	0–1	5,248	—
2 December 2008	AFC Bournemouth	Home	3–3	6,773	own goal, Gallen, McVeigh
6 December 2008	Barnet	Home	3–1	5,536	McVeigh, Martin, own goal
13 December 2008	Wycombe Wanderers	Away	0–0	5,567	—
20 December 2008	Morecambe	Home	1–1	5,664	Spillane
26 December 2008	Chesterfield	Away	2–2	4,243	Craddock, Roper
28 December 2008	Lincoln City	Home	3–2	6,643	Martin (2), Roper
13 January 2009	Chester City	Away	2–2	1,652	Martin, Emanuel
17 January 2009	Darlington	Away	1–5	3,319	Martin
24 January 2009	Bradford City	Home	3–3	6,053	Hall (2), Wasiu
27 January 2009	AFC Bournemouth	Away	1–1	5,230	—
31 January 2009	Bury	Home	1–2	5,545	Hall
14 February 2009	Dagenham & Redbridge	Away	1–2	2,310	Henderson
21 February 2009	Shrewsbury Town	Home	3–1	5,661	Craddock, Parkin, Hall
24 February 2009	Accrington Stanley	Away	0–0	1,033	—
28 February 2009	Port Vale	Away	3–1	1,358	Hall, Gallen, Martin
3 March 2009	Gillingham	Home	0–0	5,739	—
7 March 2009	Exeter City	Home	1–2	6,460	Craddock
10 March 2009	Notts County	Away	2–0	2,886	Martin, Craddock
14 March 2009	Aldershot Town	Away	1–2	3,098	Craddock
17 March 2009	Grimsby Town	Home	2–1	5,830	Bower, Hall
21 March 2009	Macclesfield Town	Home	1–0	5,363	Craddock
28 March 2009	Morecambe	Away	2–1	2,599	Martin, Gallen
31 March 2009	Rotherham United	Home	2–4	5,975	Martin, Hall
11 April 2009	Lincoln City	Away	0–0	4,664	—
13 April 2009	Chesterfield	Home	0–0	6,494	—
18 April 2009	Barnet	Away	1–1	2,808	Jarvis
21 April 2009	Wycombe Wanderers	Home	0–1	6,553	—
25 April 2009	Rochdale	Home	1–1	7,025	Craddock
2 May 2009	Brentford	Away	0–2	10,223	—

=== FA Cup ===
Round	Date	Opponent	Venue	Result	Attendance	Goalscorers	Notes
1st round	8 November 2008	Altrincham	Home	0–0	3,200	—	
1st round (replay)	18 November 2008	Altrincham	Away	0–0	2,397	—	^{[A]}
2nd round	29 November 2008	Southend United	Away	1–3	4,111	Spillane	

=== Football League Cup ===
Round	Date	Opponent	Venue	Result	Attendance	Goalscorers
1st round	12 August 2008	Plymouth Argyle	Home	2–0	2,682	Jarvis, Plummer
2nd round	26 August 2008	Reading	Away	1–5	7,498	Charles

=== Football League Trophy ===
Round	Date	Opponent	Venue	Result	Attendance	Goalscorers	Notes
2nd round	7 October 2008	Brentford	Home	2–2	2,029	Martin (2)	^{[B]}
Southern; Quarter Final	4 November 2008	Walsall	Away	1–0	1,844	Jarvis	
Southern; Semi-final	16 December 2008	Colchester United	Home	1–0	2,638	Gnakpa	
Southern; Final; First Leg	20 January 2009	Brighton & Hove Albion	Away	0–0	6,127	—	
Southern; Final; Second Leg	17 February 2009	Brighton & Hove Albion	Home	1–1	8,711	Craddock	^{[A]}
Final	5 April 2009	Scunthorpe United	Neutral	3–2	55,378	Martin, Craddock, Gnakpa	^{[C]}

== League table ==
Pos	Team	Pld	W	D	L	GF	GA	GD	Pts	Promotion, qualification or relegation
20	Macclesfield Town	46	13	8	25	45	77	−32	47	
21	Bournemouth	46	17	12	17	59	51	+8	46 (Note: Bournemouth deducted 17 points for leaving administration without a Company Voluntary Agreement.)	
22	Grimsby Town	46	9	14	23	51	69	−18	41	
23	Chester City (R)	46	8	13	25	43	81	−38	37	Relegated to Conference National
24	Luton Town (R)	46	13	17	16	58	65	−7	26 (Note: Luton Town deducted 30 points; 20 points for leaving administration without a Company Voluntary Agreement, and 10 points for making illegal payments to agents.)	Relegated to Conference National

Source: The Football League
Rules for classification: 1) points; 2) goal difference; 3) number of goals scored.
(R) Relegated

== Player statistics ==
Last match played on 2 May 2009. Players with a zero in every column only appeared as unused substitutes.

No.	Pos.	Name	League		FA Cup		League Cup		FL Trophy		Total		Discipline	
No.	Pos.	Name	Apps	Goals	Apps	Goals	Apps	Goals	Apps	Goals	Apps	Goals	Yellow card	Red card
1	GK	(England) Dean Brill	23	0	0	0	1	0	1	0	25	0	0	0
2	DF	(France) Claude Gnakpa	19 (8)	1	3	0	2	0	5 (1)	2	29 (9)	3	7	0
3	DF	(England) Sol Davis	22 (2)	1	1 (1)	0	2	0	2	0	27 (3)	1	5	1
4	DF	(Republic of Ireland) Keith Keane	40	0	2	0	1 (1)	0	5	0	48	0	3	1
5	DF	(England) Ian Roper	18 (1)	3	2	0	0	0	3	0	23 (1)	3	6	0
6	DF	(England) George Pilkington	18	0	0 (1)	0	2	0	1	0	20 (1)	0	1	0
7	MF	(Republic of Ireland) Garreth O'Connor	3	0	1 (1)	0	0	0	1 (1)	0	5 (2)	0	1	0
7	MF	(England) Ian Henderson	14 (4)	1	0	0	0	0	0	0	14 (4)	1	2	0
8	MF	(England) Kevin Nicholls	16 (3)	0	2	0	2	0	1	0	21 (3)	0	6	1
9	FW	(England) Sam Parkin	15 (8)	4	0	0	2	0	1 (2)	0	18 (10)	4	5	0
10	FW	(England) Ryan Charles	0 (10)	1	0	0	0 (1)	1	1 (1)	0	1 (12)	2	0	0
11	MF	(Republic of Ireland) Lewis Emanuel	17 (3)	1	0 (1)	0	2	0	1	0	20 (4)	1	2	0
12	DF	(England) Harry Worley	6 (2)	0	0	0	0	0	1 (1)	0	7 (3)	0	0	0
12	FW	(Nigeria) Akanni-Sunday Wasiu	2 (3)	1	0	0	0	0	0	0	2 (3)	1	0	0
12	MF	(England) David Livermore	8	0	0	0	0	0	0	0	8	0	2	0
14	MF	(England) Asa Hall	35 (7)	10	2	0	1 (1)	0	4 (1)	1	42 (9)	11	2	0
15	DF	(England) Ed Asafu-Adjaye	17 (2)	0	0	0	0	0	5	0	22 (2)	0	1	0
16	MF	(England) Rossi Jarvis	31 (4)	1	2 (1)	0	1 (1)	1	6	1	34 (6)	3	4	0
17	MF	(England) Kevin Watson	2 (4)	0	1 (1)	0	1 (1)	0	0 (1)	0	4 (7)	0	1	0
18	FW	(England) Chris Martin	39 (1)	11	3	0	2	0	5 (1)	2	49 (2)	13	11	1
19	FW	(England) Drew Talbot	4 (3)	0	0 (2)	0	0	0	2	0	6 (5)	0	1	0
20	DF	(Republic of Ireland) Michael Spillane	35 (3)	3	3	1	1	0	6	0	45 (3)	4	8	0
21	GK	(Republic of Ireland) Conrad Logan	22	0	3	0	1	0	4	0	30	0	1	0
22	FW	(England) Josh Klein-Davies	0 (1)	0	0	0	0	0	0	0	0 (1)	0	0	0
22	DF	(England) Mark Bower	16	1	0	0	0	0	0	0	16	1	3	0
23	MF	(England) Tristan Plummer	0 (5)	0	0	0	1 (1)	1	0 (1)	0	2 (7)	1	0	0
23	FW	(England) Wayne Andrews	1 (6)	0	1 (1)	0	0	0	1	0	3 (7)	0	1	0
24	FW	(England) Tom Craddock	27	10	0	0	0	0	3	2	30	12	5	0
25	DF	(England) George Beavan	3 (1)	0	1	0	0	0	1 (1)	0	5 (2)	0	0	0
26	DF	(England) Richard Jackson	0	0	0	0	0	0	0	0	0	0	0	0
26	GK	(Wales) Lewis Price	1	0	0	0	0	0	1	0	2	0	0	0
28	MF	(Northern Ireland) Paul McVeigh	9 (4)	3	3	0	0	0	2 (2)	0	14 (6)	3	1	0
29	FW	(England) Jordan Patrick	0 (2)	0	0	0	0	0	0	0	0 (2)	0	0	0
30	MF	(England) Mark Farthing	0	0	0	0	0	0	0	0	0	0	0	0
31	FW	(England) Marc Pugh	3 (1)	0	0	0	0	0	0	0	3 (1)	0	0	0
32	FW	(England) Kevin Gallen	26 (3)	3	0	0	0	0	0	0	26 (3)	3	1	0
33	DF	(England) Jake Howells	14 (14)	0	3	0	0	0	3 (2)	0	20 (16)	0	3	0
35	GK	(England) David Button	0	0	0	0	0	0	0	0	0	0	0	0
35	DF	(England) Jack Wood	0	0	0	0	0	0	0	0	0	0	0	0
36	GK	(England) Aaron Fletcher	0	0	0	0	0	0	0	0	0	0	0	0
39	FW	(England) Harry Hogarth	0	0	0	0	0	0	0	0	0	0	0	0
40	FW	(England) Scott Sinclair	0	0	0	0	0	0	0 (1)	0	0 (1)	0	0	0

== Managerial statistics ==
Only competitive games from the 2008–09 season are included.
Correct as of 13 November 2009.

Name	Nat.	From	To	Record							Honours
Name	Nat.	From	To	PLD	W	D	L	GF	GA	W%	Honours
Mick Harford	(England)	16 January 2008	1 October 2009	57	17	22	18	70	78	29.8	Football League Trophy

== Awards ==
Awarded on 26 April 2009, except Loyal Luton award awarded on 24 April 2009.

Award	Name	No.	Pos.	Notes
Luton Town Supporters Club Player of the Year	(Republic of Ireland) Keith Keane	4	DF	
Loyal Luton Supporters Club Player of the Year	(Republic of Ireland) Keith Keane	4	DF	
Players' Player of the Year	(England) Asa Hall	14	MF	
Young Player of the Year	(England) Jake Howells	33	DF	
Internet Player of the Year	(Republic of Ireland) Keith Keane	4	DF	
LTSC Junior Members' Player of the Year	(Republic of Ireland) Michael Spillane	20	DF	
Goal of the Season	(England) Chris Martin	18	FW	^{[D]}

== Transfers ==
=== In ===
Date	Player	From	Fee	Notes
7 August 2008	(France) Claude Gnakpa	Peterborough United	Free	
7 August 2008	(England) Ian Roper	Walsall	Free	
7 August 2008	(England) George Pilkington	Port Vale	Free	
7 August 2008	(England) Kevin Nicholls	Preston North End	Free	
7 August 2008	(England) Asa Hall	Birmingham City	Free	
7 August 2008	(England) Rossi Jarvis	Norwich City	Free	
8 August 2008	(England) Kevin Watson	Colchester United	Free	
6 October 2008	(Republic of Ireland) Garreth O'Connor	Unattached		
17 October 2008	(England) Wayne Andrews	Unattached		
2 January 2009	(England) Ian Henderson	Unattached		
14 January 2009	(England) Kevin Gallen	Milton Keynes Dons	Free	
30 January 2009	(England) Tom Craddock	Middlesbrough	£80,000	
26 May 2009	(England) Andy Burgess	Rushden & Diamonds	Free	
28 May 2009	(Saint Kitts and Nevis) Adam Newton	Brentford	Free	
8 June 2009	(England) Alan White	Darlington	Free	
17 June 2009	(England) Mark Tyler	Unattached		

=== Out ===
Date	Player	To	Fee	Notes
1 July 2008	(Jamaica) Richard Langley	Released		
15 July 2008	(England) Darren Currie	Chesterfield	Free	
17 July 2008	(England) Calvin Andrew	Crystal Palace	£80,000	
23 July 2008	(Republic of Ireland) David Bell	Norwich City	£600,000	
29 July 2008	(England) Zac Barrett	Cambridge City	Free	
8 August 2008	(England) Alan Goodall	Chesterfield	Free	
21 August 2008	(England) Richard Jackson	Hereford United	Free	
28 August 2008	(Republic of Ireland) Stephen O'Leary	Hereford United	Free	
1 October 2008	(England) Paul Underwood	Released		
14 December 2008	(Republic of Ireland) Garreth O'Connor	Released		
2 January 2009	(England) Kevin Watson	Released		
9 January 2009	(England) Matthew Spring	Charlton Athletic	£50,000	
16 January 2009	(England) Wayne Andrews	Released		
End of season	(England) Sam Parkin	Released		
End of season	(England) Dean Morgan	Released		
End of season	(Northern Ireland) Paul McVeigh	Released		
End of season	(England) Sol Davis	Released		
End of season	(England) Dean Brill	Released		

=== Loans in ===
Date	Player	From	End date	Notes
7 August 2008	(England) Chris Martin	Norwich City	3 May 2009	
7 August 2008	(England) Tristan Plummer	Bristol City	8 October 2008	
8 August 2008	(Republic of Ireland) Michael Spillane	Norwich City	3 May 2009	
8 August 2008	(England) Josh Klein-Davies	Bristol Rovers	13 August 2008	
21 August 2008	(Republic of Ireland) Conrad Logan	Leicester City	2 February 2009	
12 September 2008	(England) Marc Pugh	Shrewsbury Town	14 October 2008	
18 September 2008	(England) Harry Worley	Leicester City	18 November 2008	
17 October 2008	(England) Tom Craddock	Middlesbrough	17 January 2009	
14 November 2008	(England) Kevin Gallen	Milton Keynes Dons	14 January 2009	
15 January 2009	(Nigeria) Akanni-Sunday Wasiu	Colchester United	15 February 2009	
26 January 2009	(England) Mark Bower	Bradford City	17 April 2009	
2 February 2009	(Wales) Lewis Price	Derby County	2 March 2009	
6 March 2009	(England) David Button	Tottenham Hotspur	6 April 2009	
26 March 2009	(England) David Livermore	Brighton & Hove Albion	3 May 2009	
5 June 2009	(England) Liam Hatch	Peterborough United	End of 2009–10 season	

=== Loans out ===
Date	Player	To	End date	Notes
31 July 2008	(England) Matthew Spring	Sheffield United	31 December 2008	
29 August 2008	(England) Dean Morgan	Leyton Orient	3 May 2009	
22 September 2008	(England) George Beavan	Salisbury City	22 October 2008	
21 October 2008	(England) Sam Parkin	Leyton Orient	19 January 2009	
26 January 2009	(England) George Beavan	Grays Athletic	30 April 2009	
26 January 2009	(England) Harry Hogarth	Grays Athletic	30 April 2009	
27 January 2009	(England) Drew Talbot	Chesterfield	3 May 2009	
26 March 2009	(England) Ryan Charles	Kettering Town	30 April 2009	

== See also ==
- List of Luton Town F.C. seasons

== Footnotes ==
A. Luton won 4–3 in a penalty shootout.
B. Luton won 4–2 in a penalty shootout.
C. Luton Town won the match 3–2 after extra time, after the score was 2–2 after 90 minutes.
D. The goal of the season was chosen to be Chris Martin's goal on 5 April against Scunthorpe United at Wembley Stadium in the Football League Trophy final.
