= Shane Blackett =

English footballer

Personal information
- Full name: Shane Jerome Blackett
- Date of birth: 3 October 1982 (age 44)
- Place of birth: Luton, England
- Height: 6 ft 0 in (1.83 m)
- Position: Defender

Team information
- Current team: St Neots Town

Senior career*
| Years | Team | Apps | (Gls) |
| 2001–2003 | Dunstable Town | ? | (?) |
| 2003–2004 | Arlesey Town | 41 | (3) |
| 2004–2007 | Dagenham & Redbridge | 81 | (0) |
| 2007–2009 | Peterborough United | 35 | (0) |
| 2009–2012 | Luton Town | 42 | (0) |
| 2012–2013 | Arlesey Town | 33 | (0) |
| 2013–2014 | Hemel Hempstead Town | 14 | (2) |
| 2014–2015 | Dunstable Town | 48 | (3) |
| 2015– | St Neots Town | 14 | (0) |

International career
| 2006 | England C | 2 | (0) |
- * Club domestic league appearances and goals as of 16 March 2015

Shane Jerome Blackett (born 3 October 1982) is an English footballer who plays as a defender for Southern Football League Premier Division side St Neots Town. He is able to play at both centre-back and left-back.

== Career ==
Born in Luton, Blackett started his career at Spartan South Midlands League side Dunstable Town, before moving to Isthmian League club Arlesey Town. After only one year at Arlesey, Blackett and teammate Craig Mackail-Smith signed for Conference National side Dagenham & Redbridge at the beginning of the 2004–05 season. After two seasons of finishing with Dagenham in mid-table, Blackett played a part in the Daggers' promotion-winning campaign of 2006–07, but was sold to Peterborough United in the January transfer window, again alongside Mackail-Smith.

Over the next two seasons, Blackett played in both of Peterborough's back-to-back promotions making a total of 35 league appearances, although he struggled with injuries. Along with 11 other players, Blackett was placed on the transfer list at Peterborough following their promotion to the Championship.

On 22 July 2009, Blackett joined his hometown club Luton Town on a two-year contract. The transfer was unique in that it was funded partly from the proceeds of a friendly with Peterborough, which took place on 25 July. He played in 31 games during the 2009–10 season, including in two play-off semi-final defeats to York City. The next season saw Blackett play just eight times, with long-term hernia and groin injuries ruling him out of the vast majority of games. In June 2011, he signed a one-year contract extension, having passed a medical examination on the injuries from the previous season. However, further injuries restricted Blackett to twelve games during 2011–12 and, on 30 May 2012, he left the club having not been offered a new contract.

Blackett rejoined Arlesey Town, then playing in the Southern Football League Premier Division, in August 2012.

In December 2013, Blackett left Arlesey to join Hemel Hempstead Town, and he helped the club win promotion to the Conference South for the first time.

In July 2014, Blackett left Hemel Hempstead and rejoined his first club Dunstable Town following their promotion to the Southern Football League Premier Division, eleven years after leaving the club.

Blackett then joined Dunstable's league rivals, fellow Southern Premier Division side St Neots Town, in October 2015.

== Honours ==
- Dagenham & Redbridge
  - Conference National winner: 2006–07
- Peterborough United
  - Football League Two runner-up (promotion): 2007–08
  - Football League One runner-up (promotion): 2008–09
