= Godfrey Poku =

English footballer

Personal information
- Full name: Godfrey Akwasi Poku
- Date of birth: 22 July 1990 (age 36)
- Place of birth: Newham, London, England
- Height: 5 ft 11 in (1.80 m)
- Position: Midfielder

Team information
- Current team: Sittingbourne (first-team coach)

Youth career
- 2009: St Albans City

Senior career*
Years	Team	Apps	(Gls)
2009–2010	St Albans City	13	(1)
2010–2012	Luton Town	19	(0)
2010	→ St Albans City (loan)	6	(0)
2011–2012	→ Southport (loan)	22	(0)
2012–2014	Mansfield Town	4	(0)
2012–2013	→ Southport (loan)	32	(0)
2014	→ Alfreton Town (loan)	17	(0)
2014–2015	AFC Telford United	39	(0)
2015–2016	Woking	18	(0)
2015	→ Havant & Waterloovile (loan)	5	(4)
2016–2018	Oxford City	79	(6)
2018–2019	Wealdstone	43	(0)
2019–2020	Woking	26	(0)
2020–2022	Havant & Waterloovile	8	(0)
2022–2023	Hemel Hempstead Town	25	(0)
2023	Enfield	2	(0)
2023–2024	Margate	17	(0)
2024	Sittingbourne	1	(0)
Total		376	(11)
- * Club domestic league appearances and goals as of 16:28, 24 July 2026 (UTC)

Godfrey Akwasi Poku (born 22 July 1990) is an English former footballer who played as a midfielder. He is currently first-team coach at Sittingbourne.

He has previously played for St Albans City, Luton Town, Mansfield Town, AFC Telford United, Woking, Oxford City, Wealdstone and Havant & Waterlooville.

== Club career ==
Born in the Newham, London, Poku was educated at nearby Redbridge College under the guidance of Andy Russell. In February 2009, he was offered a scholarship to Fort Lewis College in Colorado, United States, having impressed scouts at an invitational football tournament at Preston College in Phoenix, Arizona the previous year. Poku chose to turn down the offer, instead preferring to pursue a full-time career in English football, and joined Conference South side St Albans City for the beginning of the 2009–10 season. He made his St Albans debut on 19 September 2009 against Weymouth. He played in 14 further games for St Albans, scoring a 25-yard goal in the return fixture against Weymouth. During his time at the club, Poku had trials with Football League clubs Reading, Leyton Orient and Southend United.

On 5 January 2010 Poku was signed on a free transfer by Conference Premier club Luton Town, along with fellow St Albans player JJ O'Donnell. Poku was highly rated by St Albans manager Steve Castle, who pleaded with him to stay at the club, and had been attracting interest from Championship side Swansea City. On 30 January, Poku and O'Donnell were loaned back to St Albans for one month. He made six further appearances for The Saints before returning to Kenilworth Road.

Poku made his Luton debut the next season on 2 October 2010 in a league match away at Barrow, coming on as a substitute, but only after making the bench because Adam Newton picked up an injury during the warm-up. Mike Simmonds of Luton Today reported after the match that "Poku in particular was highly impressive during his brief spell on the pitch, breaking up Barrow attacks and as he grew into the game, showing an eye for a pass too." Speaking after Poku's professional debut, Luton's then-manager Richard Money said, "he gave the team a lift in that crucial 15 to 20 minutes. I was really pleased with his debut."

He made two further league substitute appearances in wins over Eastbourne Borough and Forest Green Rovers, before signing a two-year contract extension in November 2010.

Poku started his first game for Luton in a 0–0 FA Trophy draw with Welling United on 12 December.

...there's a very interesting player developing there. That's his debut at this level and...he can be really pleased with it.

— Quote from then Luton Town manager Richard Money in the wake of Poku's first start for the club in a 5–0 win over York City on 18 January 2011

Poku made his first league start in a 5–0 win over York City on 18 January 2011, and was praised by manager Richard Money, who called him "highly interesting" and that he could be "really pleased" with his performance. Over the course of the 2010–11 season, he made a total of 19 appearances in Luton colours.

On 26 August 2011, Poku was loaned to Conference Premier side Southport for six months as part of the transfer that took Southport midfielder John Paul Kissock to Luton. He made a strong impression in his first games for The Sandgrounders, with captain Alan Moogan saying, "[Poku is] a good player. He wants to get on the ball, puts a foot in and he's all over the pitch... it's really good playing with him."

The 22 league games Poku played while at Southport coincided with a change in fortunes for the club – he joined them when they were 23rd in the Conference Premier and when his loan finished in early January, Southport were 6th. Southport midfielder Karl Ledsham praised Poku's contribution when he told the Liverpool Echo "Godfrey is a great lad and has done an unbelievable job, considering he'd not had many games for Luton. But you look at him and wonder how he didn't get in their team because he has brought so much to us and our midfield. He has won games by himself and has picked the lads up when we've been down in games. He's carried a couple of lads as well and has been an unbelievable signing."

Whilst Poku declared himself to be happy to return to Southport for the remainder of the season, Luton Town manager Gary Brabin remained undecided on whether to let him return to Southport. Southport manager Liam Watson told BBC Radio Merseyside "I'm more than optimistic that loan deal will be extended, but not until after the Luton game. I'd say it's 90%. I've already spoken to Gary Brabin and he's not going to make a decision until after we play the Luton game"

After returning to Luton, Poku's first eligible match for the Hatters was, coincidentally, against Southport. When asked whether Poku could give any tactical information about the Southport team, Gary Brabin said "Anyone who knows Godfrey knows that he's got no knowledge."

Southport made a bid for Poku during the January 2012 transfer window which Luton turned down. Luton Town boss Gary Brabin's reaction to the bid was to say "I'm certainly not going to be bullied into selling him or him going back on loan."

On 19 June 2012, Poku joined Conference Premier side Mansfield Town on a two-year deal.

On 31 August 2012, Poku was sent out on loan by Mansfield Town on the last day of the transfer window to Southport once again, lasting this time till the end of the season. On 1 September 2012, Poku made his Southport comeback in a 3–0 defeat to AFC Telford United, in which he played the full 90 minutes. Poku went on to appear 32 times for Southport before returning to Mansfield Town at the end of the season.

On 22 October 2013, Poku made his Mansfield Town debut in 0–0 draw with Bury, in which he replaced Martin Riley in the 74th minute. On 26 November 2013, Poku was given his only start for Mansfield Town in a 1–0 defeat to Burton Albion, in which he played the full 90 minutes.

On 3 January 2014, Poku joined Conference Premier side Alfreton Town on loan until the end of the season. On 7 January 2014, Poku made his Alfreton Town debut in a 4–1 defeat to Lincoln City, in which he played the full 90 minutes.

On 9 May 2014, it was announced that Poku would leave Mansfield Town along with nine other players at the end of their contracts on 30 June 2014.

On 1 August 2014, Poku joined Conference Premier side AFC Telford United on a one-year deal. Eight days later, Poku made his AFC Telford United debut in a 1–1 draw with Welling United, in which he played 48 minutes before being sent off for a second bookable offence. Poku went on to make 36 starts and receiving two substitute appearances before leaving at the end of the campaign.

On 23 May 2015, Poku joined National League side Woking on a one-year deal. On 11 August 2015, Poku made his Woking debut in a 2–0 victory over Bromley, in which he replaced Giuseppe Sole with eleven minutes remaining. On 12 September 2015, Poku was given his first Woking start in a 4–4 draw with Guiseley, in which he played the full 90 minutes. On 10 November 2015, after struggling to make an impression in the Woking side, Poku joined National League South side Havant & Waterlooville on a one-month loan. On the same day, Poku made his Havant & Waterlooville debut in a 3–1 victory over Oxford City, in which he scored all three. On 14 November 2015, Poku continued his good goalscoring form in a 3–1 victory against Maidenhead United, in which he netted the equalizer for Havant & Waterlooville after Jake Reid put the visitors ahead. Poku returned to Woking at the end of the month after scoring four times in five games.

On 26 June 2016, Poku joined National League South side Oxford City on a one-year deal after leaving Woking. On 6 August 2016, Poku made his Oxford City debut in a 2–1 victory over Welling United, playing the full 90 minutes. On 19 November 2016, Poku scored his first goal for Oxford in their 5–0 away victory against Margate, netting the opener in the 40th minute. After winning Oxford's player of the season award, Poku signed a new one-year deal on 30 May 2017.

On Thursday 31 May 2017, Poku joined National League South side Wealdstone

On the 23 May 2019 it was confirmed in an interview with club manager Alan Dowson that Poku would be re-joining National League side Woking . After featuring twenty-seven times in all competitions during the 2019–20 campaign, it was announced that Poku would leave the club following the expiry of his contract.

On 3 August 2020, Poku returned to National League South side, Havant & Waterloovile, on a two-year deal. He was released at the end of the 2021–22 season.

On 13 June 2022, Poku joined Hemel Hempstead Town, reuniting with former-Oxford City manager Mark Jones.

In September 2023, he joined Isthmian League Premier Division club Margate following a short spell with Enfield. In July 2024, he joined Sittingbourne.

In May 2025, he announced his retirement due to injury.

== Cocahing career ==
Following his retirement, he returned to Sittingbourne as first-team coach.

== Personal life ==
Born in England, Poku is of Ghanaian descent. In 2021 he married Nafisah Boateng who is daughter of DJ Abrantee.

== Career statistics ==
As of match played 2 January 2021.

Appearances and goals by club, season and competition
Club	Season	League			FA Cup		League Cup		Other		Total	
Club	Season	Division	Apps	Goals	Apps	Goals	Apps	Goals	Apps	Goals	Apps	Goals
St Albans City	2009–10	Conference South	13	1	1	0	—		1 (Note: Appearance(s) in FA Trophy)	0	15	1
Luton Town	2009–10	Conference Premier	0	0	0	0	—		0	0	0	0
Luton Town	2010–11	Conference Premier	9	0	4	0	—		6	0	19	0
Luton Town	2011–12	Conference Premier	10	0	0	0	—		0	0	10	0
Luton Town	Total		19	0	4	0	—		6	0	29	0
St Albans City (loan)	2009–10	Conference South	6	0	0	0	—		0	0	6	0
Southport (loan)	2011–12	Conference Premier	22	0	1	0	—		1	0	24	0
Mansfield Town	2012–13	Conference Premier	0	0	0	0	—		0	0	0	0
Mansfield Town	2013–14	League Two	4	0	1	0	0	0	0	0	5	0
Mansfield Town	Total		4	0	1	0	0	0	0	0	5	0
Southport (loan)	2012–13	Conference Premier	32	0	1	0	—		3	0	36	0
Alfreton Town (loan)	2013–14	Conference Premier	2	0	0	0	—		0	0	2	0
AFC Telford Utd	2014–15	Conference Premier	39	0	5	0	—		3	0	47	0
AFC Telford Utd	Total		39	0	5	0	—		3	0	47	0
Woking	2015–16	National League	18	0	0	0	—		2	0	20	0
Havant & Waterlooville (loan)	2015–16	National League South	5	4	0	0	—		0	0	5	4
Oxford City	2016–17	National League South	40	2	2	0	—		0	0	42	2
Oxford City	2017–18	National League South	39	4	5	0	—		1	0	45	4
Oxford City	Total		79	6	7	0	—		1	0	87	6
Wealdstone	2018–19	National League South	43	0	3	0	—		3 (Note: Two appearances in FA Trophy, one in National League South play-offs)	0	49	0
Woking	2019–20	National League	26	0	0	0	—		1	0	27	0
Havant & Waterlooville	2020–21	National League South	6	0	1	0	—		2	0	9	0
Career total			312	11	24	0	0	0	23	0	359	11

== Footnotes ==
A. The "League" column constitutes appearances and goals (including those as a substitute) in the Conference Premier and Conference South.
B. The "Other" column constitutes appearances and goals (including those as a substitute) in the FA Trophy.
