= Mark Nwokeji =

English footballer

Personal information
- Full name: Mark Obidozie Chukwuemeka Nwokeji
- Date of birth: 30 January 1982 (age 44)
- Place of birth: Manchester, England
- Height: 5 ft 8 in (1.73 m)
- Position: Striker

Team information
- Current team: Leatherhead

Youth career
- 1996–1998: Charlton Athletic
- 1998–1999: Colchester United

Senior career*
Years	Team	Apps	(Gls)
2002–2003	Chesham United	11	(1)
2003–2006	Walton & Hersham	75	(22)
2006	St Albans City	2	(0)
2006–2008	Staines Town	75	(45)
2008–2010	Dagenham & Redbridge	16	(3)
2009–2010	→ Luton Town (loan)	7	(0)
2010–2011	AFC Wimbledon	18	(1)
2011	→ Eastleigh (loan)	5	(2)
2011	Havant & Waterlooville	4	(0)
2011–2012	Staines Town	30	(7)
2012	Kingstonian		
2012	→ Merstham (loan)		
2013–2014	St Albans City	25	(3)
2014	Chesham United	6	(1)
2014–2015	Leatherhead	26	(3)
- * Club domestic league appearances and goals as of 23:15, 4 March 2024 (UTC)

Mark Obidozie Chukwuemeka Nwokeji (born 30 January 1982) is an English footballer.

== Career ==
Born in Manchester, Nwokeji was the 200 metres All-England Schoolboy champion prior to becoming a footballer. His former clubs include Walton & Hersham, Harlow Town, Leatherhead, Chesham United, Ware, St Albans City and Staines Town. Whilst with Staines on a part-time basis, Nwokeji studied as a law student.

Nwokeji signed for League Two side Dagenham & Redbridge from Isthmian Premier outfit Staines Town, where he was a prolific goalscorer, in May 2008. He scored on his debut for the Daggers on 9 August 2008, in a 6–0 home win against Chester City. He went on to make 20 appearances for Dagenham in all competitions in the 2008–09 season, scoring five times, before suffering a serious knee ligament injury in January 2009 that ruled him out for nine months.

On 12 November 2009, Nwokeji signed for Conference Premier side Luton Town on a two-month loan in order to regain match sharpness after his injury, scoring his first goal for the club in the FA Cup against Rotherham United on 28 November 2009. This was then extended to the end of the season on 13 January 2010, after he impressed Luton manager Richard Money. His loan at the club ended on 7 May 2010.

On 9 June 2010, Nwokeji signed for AFC Wimbledon, subject to scans on a recurrent cruciate ligament injury.

In June 2011, he joined Havant & Waterlooville. However, having failed to secure a first-team spot, making only four appearances, Nwokeji left Havant in September 2011. Later during the 2011–12 season, he rejoined Staines Town. In the summer of 2012, Nwokeji joined Kingstonian.
