= Gavin Caines =

English former footballer

Personal information
- Full name: Gavin Liam Caines
- Date of birth: 20 September 1983 (age 43)
- Place of birth: Birmingham, England
- Position: Defender

Senior career*
| Years | Team | Apps | (Gls) |
| 2003–2004 | Walsall | 0 | (0) |
| 2004 | → Stafford Rangers (loan) | 11 | (0) |
| 2004–2009 | Cheltenham Town | 143 | (4) |
| 2009–2010 | Kidderminster Harriers | 33 | (3) |
| 2010 | → Luton Town (loan) | 0 | (0) |
| 2010–2011 | Forest Green Rovers | 43 | (3) |
| 2011–2012 | Eastwood Town | ? | (0) |
| 2012 | → Redditch United (loan) | ? | (?) |
| 2012–2016 | Rushall Olympic | ? | (?) |
| 2016 | Blyth Spartans | 0 | (0) |
- * Club domestic league appearances and goals as of 00:27, 20 June 2016 (UTC)

Gavin Liam Caines (born 20 September 1983) is an English former footballer.

== Career ==
Caines began his career as a trainee with Walsall, but without making any first team league appearances he left to sign for Cheltenham Town in July 2004 after a trial period in pre-season which saw him score on his first appearance against Bishops Cleeve. In his time with Walsall he spent an 11-game spell out on loan at Stafford Rangers.

In his first full season at Whaddon Road Caines won the Young Player of the Year award, and the next season was involved in the club's promotion to League One. He became a regular squad member during the 2006–07 and 2007–08 seasons as Cheltenham consolidated their position in League One. Caines played only 8 league games in his final season at Cheltenham, a season which ended in relegation back to League Two. He was released from his contract in May 2009.

In August 2009, Caines signed for Conference Premier side Kidderminster Harriers on a one-year contract. He played 33 league games, though later fell out of favour with new Harriers manager Steve Burr and was loaned to divisional rivals Luton Town for the rest of the season on 25 March 2010. His loan at Luton finished on 7 May 2010, with Caines not having made a single appearance for the club.

On 6 August 2010, he appeared as a trialist for fellow Conference side Wrexham in their 0–0 friendly draw against Stoke City.

On 13 August 2010, he put pen to paper and signed for Conference side Forest Green Rovers after a busy week for the club in the transfer market, he became one of eight new signings. He made his debut the next day, scoring in a 3–1 away loss against Mansfield Town. After making 43 league appearances in his first season with Forest Green, Caines was offered a new contract by Dave Hockaday for the 2011–12 season. Caines rejected the offer however and left the club.

Caines then dropped down a level and linked up with Eastwood Town in August 2011 who are jointly managed by Caines former playing teammate at Forest Green and Cheltenham, Craig Armstrong.

Later on in the 2011–12 season Caines joined Redditch United on a one-month loan deal before later returning to Eastwood. Caines left Eastwood at the end of the season and joined Rushall Olympic.

== Honours ==
Cheltenham Town

- Football League Two play-offs: 2006
