= Shane Gore =

English footballer

Personal information
- Date of birth: 28 October 1981 (age 44)
- Place of birth: Ashford, England
- Position: Goalkeeper

Youth career
- Wimbledon

Senior career*
Years	Team	Apps	(Gls)
2000–2004	Wimbledon	1	(0)
2003	→ St Albans City (loan)	1	(0)
2003	→ Peterborough United (loan)	0	(0)
2003–2004	→ Barnet (loan)	28	(0)
2004–2005	Barnet	7	(0)
2005–2006	Stevenage Borough	3	(0)
2006–2007	Havant & Waterlooville	45	(0)
2007–2008	Thurrock	7	(0)
2007–2008	East Thurrock United	40	(0)
2008–2009	Maidenhead United	46	(0)
2009–2010	Luton Town	3	(0)
2010–2016	Chesham United	307	(0)
2015	→ Wealdstone (loan)	1	(0)
2015	→ Hungerford Town (loan)	4	(0)
2016–2020	Wingate & Finchley	200	(0)
2020	Cheshunt	8	(0)
Total		701	(0)
- * Club domestic league appearances and goals

Shane Gore (born 28 October 1981) is an English retired footballer who played as a goalkeeper.

== Career ==
Gore began his career at Wimbledon, making his only appearance for the club in the 2001–02 season as a substitute in a 6–2 defeat to Grimsby Town, where his first touch was to save a penalty on his League debut. In the 2003–04 season Gore was sent on a one-month loan to non-league St Albans City, playing once; a one-month loan to Peterborough United, where he was an unused substitute; then finally to Conference National side Barnet on a season-long loan, where he made a more successful 28 league appearances. That season Barnet were to lose on Penalties unfortunately to Shrewsbury Town Fc in the play off semi finals, where he was given Man of the Match in both legs.

After being released from Wimbledon at the end of the season, Gore signed for Barnet permanently on a one-year contract, and was a member of their Conference-winning side in the 2004–05 campaign. He was released at the end of the season, signing for Stevenage Borough, but played just three games before being released.

Gore then moved onto several clubs, playing for Conference South clubs Havant & Waterlooville and Maidenhead United, as well as Isthmian Premier side East Thurrock United. Whilst at Maidenhead, BBC London's Non League Show nominated Gore as one of the four best goalkeepers playing in non-league football.

After turning down a new contract at Maidenhead in the summer of 2009, Gore was offered a trial with Conference side Luton Town by manager Mick Harford, who was a coach at Wimbledon at the time Gore was on the fringes of the first-team. He signed an initial one-month contract with Luton on 7 August, acting as an understudy to Mark Tyler. In September 2009, his contract was extended on a month-by-month basis, before signing until the end of the season on 15 January 2010. He made his debut for Luton in the FA Cup in a 3–3 draw with Rochdale on 7 November 2009, and kept a clean sheet in a 2–0 replay victory four days later. A single substitute league appearance followed on 30 January, though he failed to break into the first-team any further and was released from his contract on 7 May 2010.

In the Summer of 2010, he signed for Chesham United of the Southern Premier League. In August 2015, Gore signed on dual-registration with Conference South side Wealdstone. After only one appearance, Gore was recalled to Chesham but then shortly after, another loan spell at this time Hungerford. After returning and cementing his place, Gore played his part in an historic Fa Cup 1st round victory over League Two side Bristol Rovers before finally going on to lose to Bradford in the second round.

In July 2016 and after making more than 300 appearances for Chesham, Gore then signed for Wingate & Finchley of the Isthmian League Premier.

After four years with Wingate, Gore signed for Cheshunt.

== Honours ==
Barnet

- Conference National winner: 2004–05
