= Madalitso Mkoloma =

Barbadian footballer (born 1984)

Personal information
- Full name: Madalitso Andrew Mkoloma
- Date of birth: 12 September 1984 (age 42)
- Place of birth: London, England
- Position: Midfielder

Senior career*
Years	Team	Apps	(Gls)
–2013	North Kensington		
2013–2015	Kensington Dragons		
2015–2017	Harefield United	10	(2)

International career
2008	Barbados	1	(0)

Managerial career
- –2013: North Kensington
- * Club domestic league appearances and goals

Madalitso Andrew Mkoloma (born 12 September 1984) is a Barbadian footballer who played as a midfielder. He has been a member of the Barbados national team.

== Early life ==
Mkoloma was born in 1985 in London, England to a Malawian father and a Barbadian mother. He is the younger brother of Sonia Mkoloma.

== Club career ==
At the time of his international call-up, Mkoloma was playing for London-based side North Kensington. Mkoloma later played for Kensington Dragons and Harefield United.

== International career ==
He made his international debut for Barbados in a May 2008 friendly match against Trinidad & Tobago, which remains his only international appearance to date.

== Coaching career ==
During his time playing for North Kensington in the Middlesex County League, Mkoloma also managed the club. Mkoloma has also held roles at Queens Park Rangers as a youth coach and as a scout.
