= Ben Wright (footballer, born 1988) =

English footballer

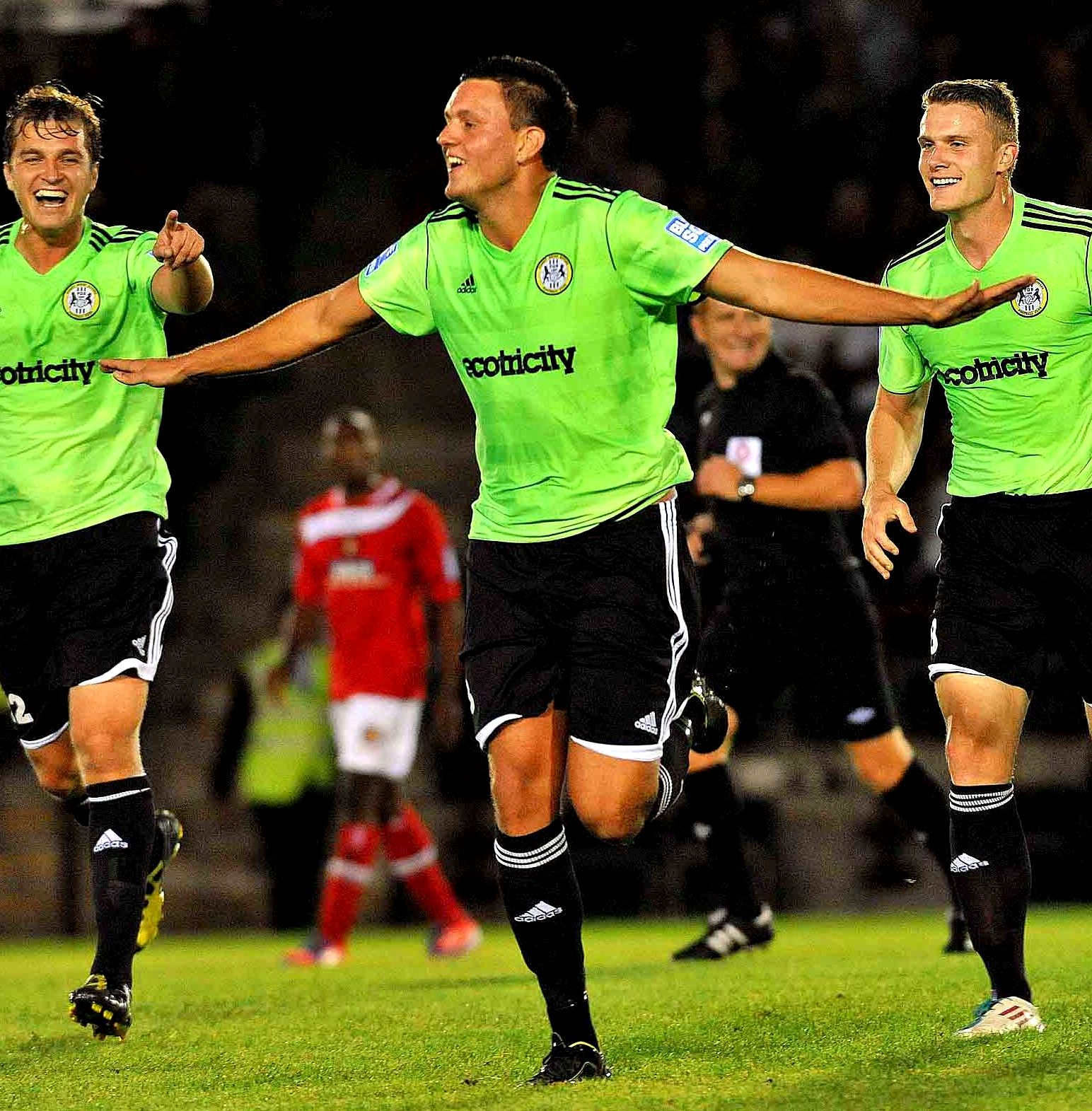
- Ben Wright (centre) celebrates scoring for Forest Green Rovers in 2012–13

Personal information
- Full name: Benjamin Matthew Wright
- Date of birth: 20 August 1988 (age 38)
- Place of birth: Basingstoke, England
- Height: 6 ft 2 in (1.88 m)
- Position: Striker

Team information
- Current team: Tadley Calleva

Youth career
- 2003–2005: Basingstoke Town

Senior career*
Years	Team	Apps	(Gls)
2005–2008	Basingstoke Town	24	(3)
2006	→ Winchester City (loan)	5	(3)
2007	→ Andover (loan)	13	(7)
2007–2008	→ Carshalton Athletic (loan)	15	(2)
2008	Andover	6	(3)
2008	Fleet Town	7	(3)
2008–2009	Hampton & Richmond Borough	21	(13)
2009–2010	Peterborough United	5	(0)
2009	→ Kettering Town (loan)	11	(3)
2009	→ Luton Town (loan)	5	(1)
2009	→ Grimsby Town (loan)	2	(0)
2010	→ Barnet (loan)	3	(0)
2010	→ Hayes & Yeading United (loan)	4	(5)
2010–2011	Crawley Town	9	(0)
2010–2011	→ Newport County (loan)	5	(1)
2011	→ Hayes & Yeading United (loan)	18	(1)
2011–2012	Braintree Town	40	(17)
2012–2013	Forest Green Rovers	18	(3)
2013	→ Braintree Town (loan)	10	(2)
2013–2014	Salisbury City	20	(5)
2013–2014	→ Basingstoke Town (loan)	3	(1)
2014	→ Eastleigh (loan)	20	(13)
2014	Eastleigh	10	(1)
2014–2015	Havant & Waterlooville	21	(8)
2015–2016	Maidenhead United	38	(14)
2016–2017	Gosport Borough	35	(10)
2017–2020	Basingstoke Town	78	(25)
2018	→ Gosport Borough (loan)	10	(7)
2020–2021	Hartley Wintney	11	(3)
2021–	Tadley Calleva	48	(26)

International career
2010	England C	1	(0)
- * Club domestic league appearances and goals as of 11:19, 29 March 2023 (UTC)

Benjamin Matthew Wright (born 20 August 1988) is an English footballer who plays as a striker for Tadley Calleva.

== Career ==
Wright was born in Basingstoke, Hampshire. After scoring prolifically for Hampton & Richmond Borough in 2008, Wright attracted attention from bigger clubs, including Fulham, where he passed a medical and looked set to sign. However, Roy Hodgson backed out of the £50,000 transfer at the last minute, and he instead joined League One team Peterborough United on 29 January 2009 on a three-and-a-half-year contract for an undisclosed fee. He made his League debut in a 2–1 defeat to Southend United after coming on as a substitute in the 86th minute on 28 February. He joined Conference Premier team Kettering Town on loan until the end of April in March and he made his debut after starting in a 2–0 victory over Weymouth. He scored his first two goals for Kettering in a 2–1 victory over Ebbsfleet United.

On 29 September 2009, Wright signed on a one-month loan for Conference side Luton Town. On 27 November Wright signed a two-month loan deal with Grimsby Town, but after only featuring in two games inside his first month, and spending the rest as an unused substitute, manager Neil Woods allowed him to return to Peterborough a month early. On 11 March 2010, Wright agreed to join Barnet on an emergency loan deal until 20 April after injuries depleted their forward line.

Wright was transfer listed at the end of the 2010–11 season, before joining Hayes & Yeading United on loan in August 2010, scoring two goals on his debut against Bath City. Later that same month he joined Crawley Town on a two-year contract for an undisclosed fee. On 3 November 2010, Wright was sent out on loan to fellow Conference side Newport County. In January 2011 he rejoined Hayes & Yeading United on loan until the end of the season.

Wright left Crawley Town by mutual consent in June 2011 and subsequently joined Braintree Town. He spent a season with Braintree, finishing as top goal scorer notching 18 goals in all competitions but left the club at the end of the season.

Wright then joined fellow Conference Premier side Forest Green Rovers on 11 May 2012. He made his debut for Forest Green on the opening day of the 2012–13 season against Cambridge United as a substitute. He scored his first goal for Forest Green on 1 September 2012 in a 3–1 win against Hyde at The New Lawn. After a lengthy injury lay off, Wright returned on loan to former club Braintree Town on 28 March 2013. On the same day Wright made his second debut for the club, earning an assist for Braintree's first goal in a 2–1 win against Alfreton Town.

On 23 July 2013, Wright and Forest Green came to a mutual agreement to terminate his contract a year early so he could go in search for more first team football. He signed for Salisbury City the next day, on a 2-year contract. The pre-season period ahead of the 2013–14 season saw him feature regularly for Salisbury in their fixtures. He impressed by scoring 4 goals against a developmental Bournemouth squad, and one against Eastleigh. He was also recognised for his impressive delivery of the ball from set pieces. He re-joined Basingstoke Town on a month's loan in December 2013, making his second début in the abandoned match at Gosport Borough on 28 December 2013. On 4 December 2014 he joined Havant & Waterlooville from Eastleigh for an undisclosed fee, after being contracted to Eastleigh since the summer.

On 30 June 2015 he left the Hawks for Maidenhead United by mutual consent, to become their ninth summer signing, linking up with manager Alan Devonshire for the third time in his career.

In June 2016 he completed a move to National League South rivals Gosport Borough on a two-year deal. He returned to his hometown club Basingstoke Town ahead of the 2017–18 season.

In March 2018, Wright returned to Gosport Borough on loan from Basingstoke Town, registering his first goal in a 2–5 defeat to Redditch United on 17 March.

In August 2020, Wright joined Hartley Wintney.

In July 2022, Wright remained with Combined Counties Football League side Tadley Calleva having finished as their top scorer the previous season.
