= Jordan Patrick =

Footballer (born 1992)

Personal information
- Date of birth: 14 October 1992 (age 34)
- Place of birth: Luton, England
- Position: Striker

Youth career
- –2008: Luton Town

Senior career*
Years	Team	Apps	(Gls)
2008–2011	Luton Town	2	(0)
2009	→ Spalding United (loan)		
2011	→ Hitchin Town (loan)		
2011	Kettering Town	0	(0)
2011–2013	Arlesey Town		
2013	Barton Rovers		
2013–	Bedford Town		
- * Club domestic league appearances and goals as of 18:47, 4 October 2011 (UTC)

Jordan Daniel Patrick (born 14 October 1992) is an English semi-professional footballer who plays as a striker.

== Career ==
=== Luton Town ===
Patrick was born in Luton, Bedfordshire. He was thrown into Luton Town's first-team squad during an injury crisis in mid-October 2008, having only just turned 16 years of age.

A product of Luton Town's youth academy, Patrick was handed a place on the substitutes' bench for a home game with Accrington Stanley on 18 October 2008. He had been excused from lessons at challney high school for boys the day before to be able to train with the first team for the game at Kenilworth Road.

Patrick set the record for the youngest ever footballer to play for Luton Town, after coming on a substitute in the 82nd minute in a 2–2 away draw at Grimsby Town on 21 October 2008, aged 16 years and seven days. He set up Tom Craddock's equaliser deep into injury time to secure a point. Patrick made a second appearance from the bench in Luton's 3–0 defeat to Shrewsbury Town on 1 November 2008.

Upon bringing Patrick into the first-team squad, manager Mick Harford said, "Jordan is a striker who has done very well in the Under-16s and he may be involved, we don't know yet.

"He's a local boy but he hasn't played a lot of football. I spoke to Alan Neilson and Gregg Broughton, our Youth Team Coaches, about promoting one or two of the kids through to give them an opportunity because of the situation we're in with injuries and his name kept cropping up in conversation.

"I brought him in this morning from school to train with the first-team and he's going back to school this afternoon. He has got good movement and I liked what I saw.

"I don't want to do it but circumstances mean I've had to do it. I wouldn't do it just for the sake of it and it's needs must really."

=== Spalding United (loan) ===
In December 2009, Patrick joined non-league side Spalding United on loan to gain valuable first-team experience. Spalding were in the Northern Premier League Division One South and Patrick scored against Leek Town

=== Luton Town ===
Patrick did not play for Luton again until the 2010–11 season, where he came on as a substitute in an FA Trophy victory over Welling United on 14 December 2010.

=== Hitchin Town (loan) ===
In February 2011 Patrick was loaned to Hitchin Town

=== Luton Town ===
Patrick was released at the end of 2010–11 season after not being given a professional contract. The club said that he along with strike partner Liam Toomey who was also released needed a fresh start and a new challenge. Both players were wished good luck in the future.

=== Kettering Town ===
Patrick spent a brief spell at Conference Premier side Kettering Town . Patrick sat Ketterings historic first game at Nene Park on the bench .

=== Arlesey Town ===
Patrick was signed by Arlesey Town of the Evo-Stik League Southern Premier Division in August 2011 . In January 2012 Patrick scored a first half brace against Weymouth . In November 2012 Patrick appeared as a substitute in the 3–0 loss to Coventry City in the F.A.Cup replacing another former Hatter Sol Davis.

=== Barton Rovers ===
At the end of the 2012–13 season Patrick spent a short time at Barton Rovers

=== Bedford Town ===
In the summer of 2013 Patrick signed for Bedford Town. Patrick was given his first start in Bedford Town's 3–2 win over AFC Totton.
