= George Beavan =

English footballer

Personal information
- Full name: George David Beavan
- Date of birth: 12 January 1990 (age 36)
- Place of birth: Sidcup, England
- Height: 5 ft 9 in (1.75 m)
- Position: Defender

Team information
- Current team: Tonbridge Angels

Youth career
- ?–2008: Luton Town

Senior career*
| Years | Team | Apps | (Gls) |
| 2008–2010 | Luton Town | 6 | (0) |
| 2008 | → Salisbury City (loan) | 3 | (0) |
| 2009 | → Grays Athletic (loan) | 19 | (1) |
| 2009 | → Grays Athletic (loan) | 6 | (0) |
| 2012 | Fisher | ? | (?) |
| 2013–2016 | Billericay Town | ? | (?) |
| 2016– | Tonbridge Angels | 30 | (0) |
- * Club domestic league appearances and goals as of 00:00, 11 February 2017 (UTC)

George David Beavan (born 13 February 1990 and is an English footballer who plays as a defender for Tonbridge Angels in the Isthmian League Premier Division.

== Career ==
Beavan was given a trial at Luton in 2006 by then youth team coach Marvin Johnson, and was a member of the youth team for the 2006–07 season. He made his first team debut in the 4–1 defeat at home to Bournemouth on 9 February 2008 as a substitute, and made one more appearance that season as Luton were relegated to League Two.

Beavan joined Conference side Salisbury City on a month's loan in September 2008 and made his debut in a 1–0 victory against Woking. He returned to Luton having made three appearances.

Beavan made a further four league appearances for Luton in the 2008–09 season, as well as playing in the Football League Trophy victories over Walsall and Colchester United. In January 2009, he signed for Conference side Grays Athletic on loan until the end of the season, where he made nineteen league appearances, scoring once and helping them avoid relegation.

He started the following season, 2009–10, at Luton before returning to Grays Athletic on 17 August, where he made six appearances in a four-month loan spell. Beavan failed to play again during the season, and was released by Luton on 31 May 2010.

He joined Fisher in January 2012.

== Honours ==
Luton Town

- Football League Trophy winner: 2008–09
