= Ryan Charles =

English professional footballer (born 1989)

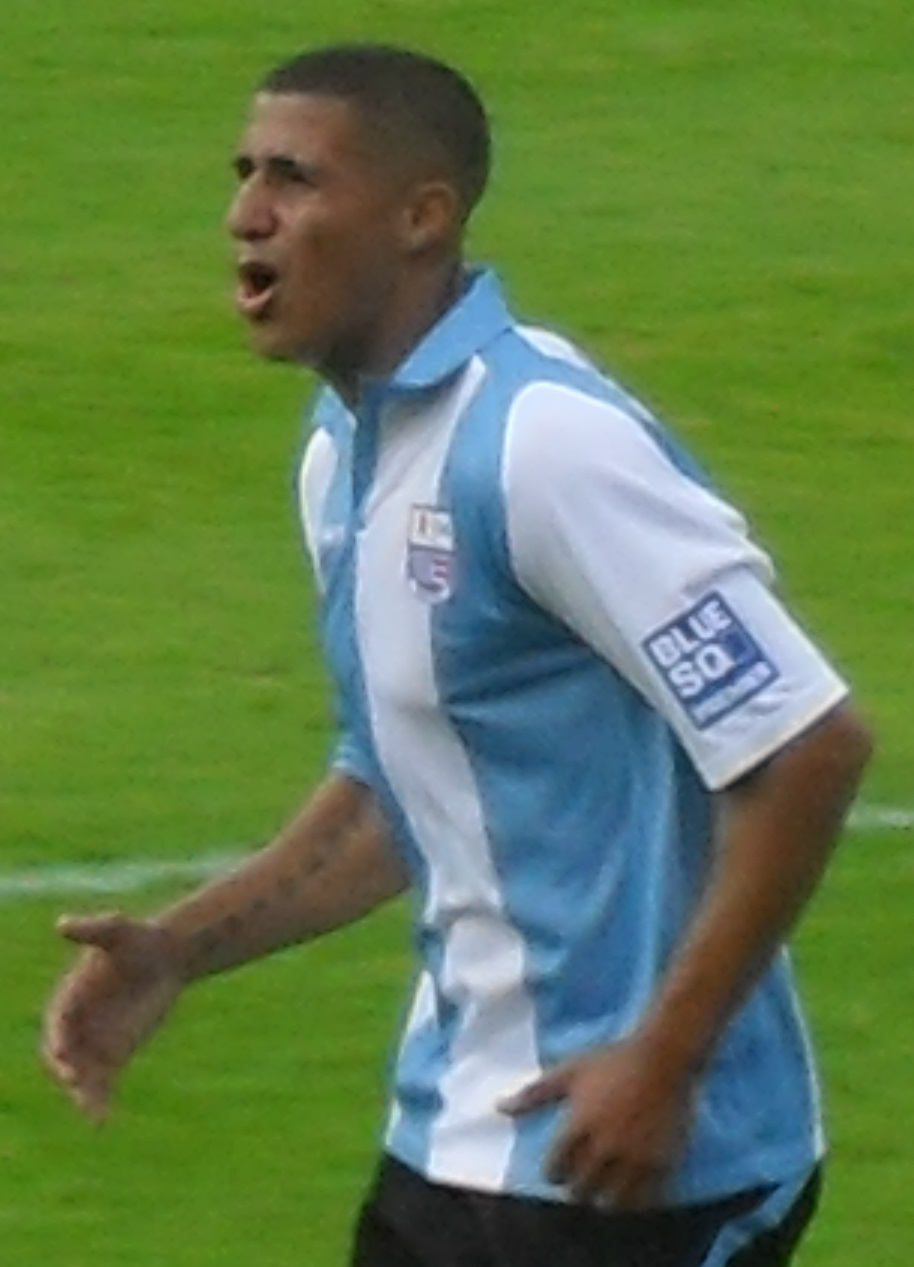
- Charles playing for Rushden & Diamonds in 2010

Personal information
- Date of birth: 30 September 1989 (age 37)
- Place of birth: Enfield, London, England
- Positions: Striker; winger

Team information
- Current team: Aveley
- Number: 11

Youth career
- 1998–2007: Luton Town

Senior career*
Years	Team	Apps	(Gls)
2007–2010	Luton Town	23	(4)
2006–2007	→ Hitchin Town (loan)	10	(3)
2007–2008	→ Hinckley United (loan)	1	(0)
2009	→ Kettering Town (loan)	9	(1)
2009	→ Kidderminster Harriers (loan)	3	(0)
2010–2011	Rushden & Diamonds	39	(11)
2011–2012	Cambridge United	19	(3)
2012	→ Newport County (loan)	14	(2)
2012–13	Newport County	9	(1)
2013	Hemel Hempstead Town	11	(6)
2013	→ Bath City (loan)	7	(0)
2013–2014	Merthyr Town	9	(1)
2014	Chesham United	2	(2)
2018–2025	Bishop's Stortford	151	(28)
2025-	Aveley	29	(8)

International career
2024-	Saint Lucia	4	(1)
- * Club domestic league appearances and goals

Ryan Charles (born 30 September 1989) is a professional footballer who plays as a striker for Bishop's Stortford.

== Career ==
Born in Enfield, Greater London, Charles joined Luton Town as a 9-year-old, turning down rivals Watford in the process.

In his first year as an apprentice in 2006, Charles scored 17 goals for the youth team, earning him the top goal scorer acclaim. He was loaned to neighbouring Hitchin Town during the 2006–07 campaign, where he netted 3 goals in 10 appearances for the Canaries, including a 25-yard volley against Rugby Town.

In his second year as a scholar, Charles was sent out on loan to Conference North side Hinckley United in December 2007, where he made two appearances, one in the league, in a two-month loan spell.

On 8 April 2008, Charles made his Luton Town debut as a substitute against Southend United. He went on to make 7 league appearances for Luton during the latter part of the season as an attacker alongside Sam Parkin. He scored his first goal for the club in a 3–0 victory against Oldham Athletic, after chesting the ball down, turning his marker and volleying home. This goal earned him the 'Goal of the Season' award as voted for by Hatters fans. Charles signed a professional contract at the end of the season, and was also awarded the 'Young Player of the Season' trophy.

In the 2008–09 season, Charles made ten league appearances for Luton, scoring once. He also scored in the Football League Trophy Southern Area Final in a 4–3 penalty shoot-out victory against Brighton that saw Luton into the final at Wembley, which they went on to win. On 26 March 2009, Charles was sent on loan to Kettering Town, where he made nine appearances, scoring once.

On 26 November 2009, Charles joined Kidderminster Harriers, the team he had scored a late winner against as a Luton player in October, on a one-month loan as part of the deal taking Harriers striker Matthew Barnes-Homer to Luton. He played three games at Kidderminster, before returning to Luton. Charles did not play another game that season, and was released from the club on 31 May 2010.

Charles signed for Luton's Conference National rivals Rushden & Diamonds on 1 July 2010.

In June 2011, he joined Cambridge United. He was a free transfer due to Rushden and Diamonds' expulsion from the football conference. He signed a one-year contract with Cambridge United in the summer of 2011.

On 6 January 2012, Charles joined Newport County on loan until the end of the 2011–12 season. Charles made his debut for Newport versus Luton on 7 January but was sent off after 33 minutes for a two-footed challenge. Following the end of his loan spell at Newport County, Charles left parent club Cambridge United as he decided not to exercise his one-year extension to his contract and joined Newport on a permanent deal. Charles was released by Newport County on 5 February 2013.

In 2018, Charles joined Bishop's Stortford; during his first season, he made thirty league appearances and scoring six goals, and continued to feature regularly throughout the next seven years.

== International career ==
In October 2024 at the age of 35, Charles received his first called up to the Saint Lucia national team for a set of 2024–25 CONCACAF Nations League matches.

== Career statistics ==
=== International ===
As of match played 6 June 2025

Appearances and goals by national team and year
National team	Year	Apps	Goals
Saint Lucia	2024	3	1
Saint Lucia	2025	1	0
Total		4	1

Scores and results list Saint Lucia's goal tally first, score column indicates score after each Charles goal.

List of international goals scored by Ryan Charles
No.	Date	Venue	Opponent	Score	Result	Competition	Ref.
1	18 November 2024	Ergilio Hato Stadium, Willemstad, Curaçao	Curaçao	1–1	1–4	2024–25 CONCACAF Nations League B	

== Honours ==
Luton Town

- Football League Trophy: 2008–09
