= Andy Burgess (footballer) =

English footballer (born 1981)

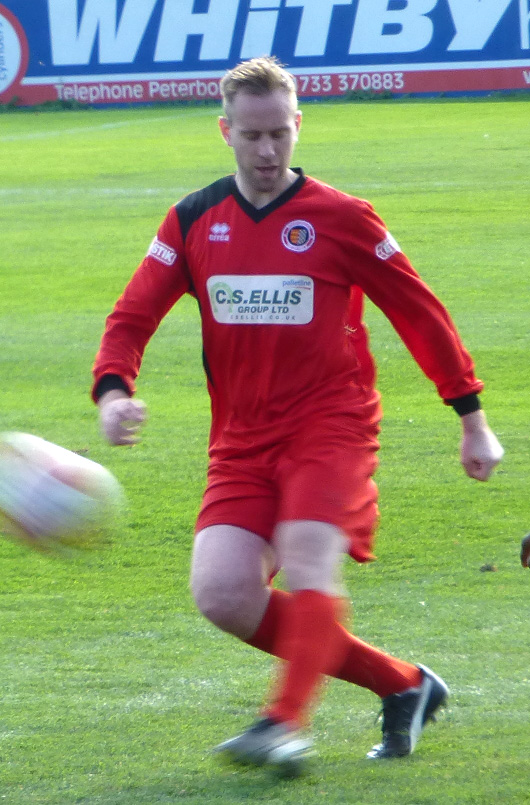
- Burgess playing for Stamford in 2013

Personal information
- Full name: Andrew John Blakemore Burgess
- Date of birth: 10 August 1981 (age 45)
- Place of birth: Bedford, England

Youth career
- ?–1999: Rushden & Diamonds

Senior career*
Years	Team	Apps	(Gls)
1999–2006	Rushden & Diamonds	239	(23)
2006–2007	Oxford United	57	(7)
2007–2009	Rushden & Diamonds	94	(6)
2009–2010	Luton Town	6	(0)
2009	→ Mansfield Town (loan)	5	(1)
2010	Mansfield Town	12	(1)
2010	Chester	7	(0)
2010	Corby Town	0	(0)
2010–2011	Droylsden	4	(0)
2011	Woking	12	(3)
2011	Corby Town	12	(3)
2011–2012	Stamford	9	(1)
2013	AFC Liverpool	13	(1)
Total		470	(46)

International career
2007–2009	England C	8	(2)

Managerial career
- 2009–2010: Sheffield Wednesday Womens
- 2010–2011: Preston North End Women
- 2012–2013: Leeds United Ladies
- 2014: Barnton
- 2015–2016: Barnton (assistant)
- 2022: AFC Rushden & Diamonds
- 2023–2024: Southport (assistant)
- * Club domestic league appearances and goals

Andrew John Blakemore Burgess (born 10 August 1981) is an English former professional footballer and author of 11 of Diamonds: My Nene Park Story, published in August 2026.

== Playing career ==
Born in Bedford, Bedfordshire, Burgess began his professional career in 1999 at Rushden & Diamonds, where he was also a trainee. He won the Football Conference title with Rushden in 2001, and the Third Division championship in 2003, and had made 239 appearances for Rushden in six seasons when he was placed on the transfer list at the end of the 2004–05 season after he had requested a transfer in February 2005. A move to Swansea City fell through, and, a month later in July 2005, he broke his left leg in a pre-season friendly. He returned to the side in October 2005, and joined Oxford United shortly afterwards, signing a two-and-a-half-year contract.

Burgess was retained by Oxford United after relegation and a good start to the 2006–07 season saw him being praised by manager Jim Smith, who said of him after a win over York City in October 2006, "Andy's a very talented player, and he was outstanding. Some of the things that he did were really top drawer."

At the end of the 2006–07 season, Burgess was named in the England National Game XI squad for the Four Nations Tournament against Ireland, Wales and Scotland, and in May 2007, he scored against Scotland in a 3–0 victory as England went on to win tournament.

In August 2007, Burgess re-joined Rushden & Diamonds on a free transfer with a sell-on clause attached, signing a two-year contract. At the end of the 2007–08 season, he won the Player of the Year award at Rushden and admitted that he had sometimes made the wrong decisions in his career, saying, "I don't think there's any points having regrets. I've enjoyed my football this season as much as I have during my whole career working for Garry Hill and I think next season we can go on and achieve good things here."

He was again selected for the England C squad in May 2008 and scored in the 3–0 win over Wales as England retained the Four Nations trophy.

After rejecting the offer of a new contract from Rushden at the end of the 2008–09 season, Burgess signed a two-year contract with Luton Town in May 2009.

Burgess will forever remain second on the all-time list of Rushden & Diamonds appearances with 333, and first on their list of appearances in the Football League, with 147. At the time of leaving, Burgess was Club Captain, and had won the 7 player of the year awards that season, including Players Player and Supporters Player. Having won the Young Player of the Year in 2000 and 2001, Burgess won every individual award available during his time at the club, in addition to two league titles, and remains a club legend.

Burgess, who was born in Bedfordshire and supports Luton Town, called the transfer a "dream move". However, a hamstring injury sustained in late August kept Burgess out of the team for two months and, upon his return to the team, he played in just three further matches before joining Mansfield Town on a one-month loan on 26 November, with the permanent transfer taking place on 1 January 2010. Burgess left Mansfield at the end of the season by mutual consent. On 21 July 2010, he joined Chester in the Northern Premier League Division One North, dropping four leagues. He went on to sign for Fleetwood Town in October 2010 on an emergency basis. On 20 November 2010, Burgess joined Corby Town in the Conference North, after mutually agreeing the termination of his Chester contract. Burgess went on to sign for Conference South club Woking in March 2011.

Burgess left Woking at the end of the 2010–11 season after defeat in the play-offs, and rejoined Corby Town as player/coach for the 2011–12 season. In July 2013, Burgess signed for Stamford.

== Managerial career ==
Burgess briefly managed Sheffield Wednesday Women in the Northern Premier Division from October 2009 until February 2010. He was formerly first-team coach at Leeds Carnegie Ladies and, prior to that, assistant manager at National Premier Division side Nottingham Forest Ladies. He was named Preston North End Women manager in June 2010. On 6 July 2012, Burgess was handed the role of First Team Manager at FA National Premier Division club Leeds United Ladies. On 31 May 2014, Burgess took up his first managerial role in men's football when he accepted the position of first team manager of North West Counties Division One club Barnton.

In February 2022, Burgess was appointed interim manager of AFC Rushden & Diamonds before being given the role on a permanent basis in April. On 1 October 2022, he was sacked with the club sitting bottom of the division.

Appointed in May 2023, Burgess took up the position of assistant manager at Merseyside club, Southport. In October 2023, Burgess was appointed Head of Football Operations, before becoming the club's Chief Operating Officer, he left the role in 2026.

== Honours ==
Rushden & Diamonds

- Football League Third Division: 2002–03
