= Liam Hatch =

English footballer (born 1982)

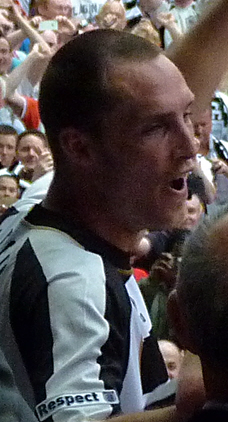
- Hatch with Darlington following the 2011 FA Trophy Final

Personal information
- Full name: Liam Maurice Adam Hatch
- Date of birth: 3 April 1982 (age 44)
- Place of birth: Hitchin, England
- Height: 6 ft 3 in (1.91 m)
- Positions: Striker; defender

Senior career*
Years	Team	Apps	(Gls)
2000–2001	Ramsgate		
2001	Herne Bay	24	(1)
2001–2003	Gravesend & Northfleet	47	(12)
2002	→ Ashford Town (Kent) (loan)	2	(1)
2003–2008	Barnet	144	(25)
2008–2011	Peterborough United	12	(2)
2008–2009	→ Darlington (loan)	15	(7)
2009	→ Darlington (loan)	11	(2)
2009–2010	→ Luton Town (loan)	21	(4)
2010–2011	→ Darlington (loan)	17	(4)
2011–2012	Darlington	42	(10)
2012–2014	Gateshead	64	(15)
2014–2015	Darlington 1883		
2015–2016	Sunderland RCA		

International career
2004–2005	England C	6	(3)
- * Club domestic league appearances and goals

Liam Maurice Adam Hatch (born 3 April 1982) is an English former footballer who played as a striker and defender.

== Career ==
=== Early career ===
Born in Hitchin, Hertfordshire, Hatch started his career with Kent League side Ramsgate, before joining Herne Bay in 2001 and moving to Gravesend & Northfleet in 2001. He was part of the side that won the Isthmian League Premier Division in the 2001–02 season, resulting in promotion to the Football Conference.

=== Barnet ===
Hatch moved to Conference side Barnet at the beginning of the 2003–04 season for a fee of £23,000. He was a member of the Barnet team that won promotion to The Football League in the 2004–05 season, scoring ten league goals. Hatch managed just five goals over the next two seasons for Barnet in League Two, prompting manager Paul Fairclough to place him on the transfer list at the beginning of the 2007–08 season. However, he fought back into the first team in October, going on to score six goals in his next nine games. He totalled eight goals in the first half of the season, attracting the attention of other clubs. In December 2007, it was announced that Hatch would join Peterborough United for a fee of £150,000 at the start of the January transfer window.

=== Peterborough United ===
Hatch joined Peterborough from Barnet in January 2008 for a fee of £150,000. He scored two goals in twelve games for Peterborough as they were promoted to League One. At the start of the 2008–09 season, with playing chances at London Road limited, he moved on loan to Darlington. On 18 November 2008, in an FA Cup game against Droylsden, Hatch suffered a suspected broken neck after a collision with teammate Ritchie Foran, prompting the game to be delayed for 35 minutes. However, scans later confirmed that Hatch had not broken his neck in the incident. He returned to Peterborough on 5 January 2009, before returning to Darlington on loan until the end of the 2008–09 season on 8 January.

Along with eleven other players, Hatch was placed on the transfer list at Peterborough following their promotion to the Championship. Despite interest from twelve clubs, including three in League One, Hatch signed for Conference Premier side Luton Town on a season-long loan, with a view to a permanent move, on 5 June 2009. He incurred an ankle injury in pre-season, and did not make his first appearance for the club until 12 September. He played in three further games before being sidelined once more through the same ankle problem. He made his return nearly four months later on 27 January 2010, playing a key role in a 2–0 victory over Histon. He started in a 3–2 loss to Ebbsfleet United three days later, scoring his first goal for the club. After the defeat, Luton manager Richard Money singled out Hatch for praise, claiming he "has played [Ebbsfleet] on his own". On 7 May 2010, Hatch left Luton as a result of his loan period ending.

Hatch rejoined Darlington in July 2010 on loan until January 2011.

=== Darlington ===
On 1 January 2011 Hatch signed for Darlington on a permanent one-and-a-half-year contract for an undisclosed fee, rejecting a move to rivals Grimsby Town.

=== Gateshead ===
On 13 January 2012, Hatch signed for Gateshead, along with Jamie Chandler, for a nominal fee. He made his debut as a second-half substitute against Kettering Town on 24 January 2012. He agreed a new one-year contract with the club in May 2012 to cover the 2012–13 season. At the end of the 2013–14 season, Hatch was released by Gateshead.

=== Return to Darlington ===
Upon his release from Gateshead, Hatch signed a one-year contract with Darlington 1883.

=== Sunderland RCA ===
In 2015 Hatch signed for Sunderland RCA.

== Honours ==
Gravesend & Northfleet

- Isthmian League Premier Division winner: 2001–02

Barnet

- Conference Premier winner: 2004–05

Peterborough United

- League Two runner-up: 2007–08

Darlington

- FA Trophy winner: 2010–11
