= 2010–11 AFC Wimbledon season =

AFC Wimbledon
2010–11 season
- Chairman: Erik Samuelson
- Manager: Terry Brown
- Conference Premier: 2nd (promoted via play-offs to Football League Two)
- FA Cup: Second Round (vs Stevenage)
- FA Trophy: Second Round (vs Woking)
- Top goalscorer: League: Danny Kedwell (24); All: Danny Kedwell (25)
- Highest home attendance: 4,538 v Fleetwood Town (Conference National play-off Semi-Final, 11 May 2011)
- Lowest home attendance: 1,201 v Braintree Town (FA Trophy First Round, 11 December 2010)
- Average home league attendance: 3,476
Home colours	Away colours	Third colours

The 2010–11 season was the ninth in the history of AFC Wimbledon, their third season in the Football Conference and their second season in Conference National. The club went on to win promotion to the Football League in the historic play-off final against Luton Town on 21 May 2011.

== League table ==
Pos	Team	Pld	W	D	L	GF	GA	GD	Pts	Promotion, qualification or relegation
1	Crawley Town (C, P)	46	31	12	3	93	30	+63	105	Promotion to Football League Two
2	AFC Wimbledon (O, P)	46	27	9	10	83	47	+36	90	Qualification for the Conference Premier play-offs
3	Luton Town	46	23	15	8	85	37	+48	84	Qualification for the Conference Premier play-offs
4	Wrexham	46	22	15	9	66	49	+17	81	Qualification for the Conference Premier play-offs
5	Fleetwood Town	46	22	12	12	68	42	+26	78	Qualification for the Conference Premier play-offs

Source: Football Conference
Rules for classification: 1) points; 2) goal difference; 3) number of goals scored.
(C) Champions; (O) Play-off winners; (P) Promoted

== Results summary ==
Overall								Home						Away					
Pld	W	D	L	GF	GA	GD	Pts	W	D	L	GF	GA	GD	W	D	L	GF	GA	GD
46	27	9	10	83	47	+36	90	17	3	3	46	15	+31	10	6	7	37	32	+5

Last updated: 21 May 2011.
Source: Soccernet

== Match results ==
=== Pre-season friendlies ===
10 July 2010	AFC Wimbledon	2–0	Charlton Athletic	Kingsmeadow
15:00 BST (UTC+01)	Molley 50'; Minshull 82'	Report		Attendance: 1,530

13 July 2010	Maidenhead United	0–3	AFC Wimbledon	York Road
19:45 BST (UTC+01)		Report	L. Moore 65'; Main 68'; Hatton 90'

16 July 2010	AFC Wimbledon	0–1	Millwall	Kingsmeadow
15:00 BST (UTC+01)		Report	Morison 7'	Attendance: 1,697

20 July 2010	Corinthian Casuals	2–6	AFC Wimbledon	King George's Field
19:45 BST (UTC+01)	Mann 43'; Sergeant 78'	Report	Jones 8'; Gregory 13'; Sam-Yorke 24' 40'; Main 65' 88'	Attendance: 325

24 July 2010	Woking	0–4	AFC Wimbledon	Kingfield Stadium
19:45 BST (UTC+01)		Report	Kedwell 4' 24' 43' 60'	Attendance: 1,042

27 July 2010	AFC Wimbledon	2–0	Kingstonian	Kingsmeadow
15:00 BST (UTC+01)	Main 70'; Minshull 76'	Report		Attendance: 785

30 July 2010	Tiverton Town	1–2	AFC Wimbledon	Ladysmead
19:45 BST (UTC+01)	Marshall 51' (pen.)	Report	Douglin 57'; Sam-Yorke 67'

31 July 2010	Exeter City	2–1	AFC Wimbledon	St James Park, Exeter
15:00 BST (UTC+01)	Nardiello 11'; Cureton 70'	Report	Main 19'	Attendance: 1,807

7 August 2010	AFC Wimbledon	2–1	Arsenal XI	Kingsmeadow
15:00 BST (UTC+01)	S. Moore 53'; Blackman 57'	Report	Afobe 90'	Attendance: 2,922

9 August 2010	Walton Casuals	0–2	AFC Wimbledon	Waterside Stadium
15:00 BST (UTC+01)		Report

=== Conference National ===
==== August ====
14 August 2010 1	Southport	0–1	AFC Wimbledon	Haig Avenue
15:00 BST (UTC+01)		Report	Gregory (yellow card) 45'; Jolley 72'; Yakubu (yellow card) 79'; Minshull (red card) 87'; Blackman (yellow card) 88'	Attendance: 1,802; Referee: Seb Stockbridge

17 August 2010 2	AFC Wimbledon	2–0	Histon	Kingsmeadow
19:45 BST (UTC+01)	Kedwell 90+1' (pen.); Wellard 90+1'	Report	Ilesanmi (yellow card) 24' (yellow card) 82' (red card)	Attendance: 3,126; Referee: Warren Atkin

21 August 2010 3	AFC Wimbledon	3–0	Tamworth	Kingsmeadow
15:00 BST (UTC+01)	S. Moore 38'; Kedwell 60' 79'	Report	Oakes (yellow card) 70'	Attendance: 3,144; Referee: Kevin Johnson

24 August 2010 4	Rushden & Diamonds	1–0	AFC Wimbledon	Nene Park
19:45 BST (UTC+01)	Huke 65'; Corcoran (yellow card) 90'	Report	Yakubu (yellow card) 32'; Blackman (yellow card) 58'; Jackson (yellow card) 90'	Attendance: 1,365

28 August 2010 5	Eastbourne Borough	2–3	AFC Wimbledon	Langney Sports Club
15:00 BST (UTC+01)	Weatherstone (yellow card) 62' (goal) 70'; Langston (yellow card) 75'; Atkin 77'; Crabb (yellow card) 87'	Report	Kedwell 31' 90'; Minshull 55'	Attendance: 2,485

30 August 2010 6	AFC Wimbledon	2–2	Newport County	Kingsmeadow
19:45 BST (UTC+01)	Hatton (yellow card) 13'; Kedwell 16' (pen.) (yellow card) 52'; Blackman (yellow card) 17'; Jolley (yellow card) 52' (goal) 56'	Report	Odhiambo (yellow card) 15'; Reid 25' 79'; Bignot (yellow card) 32'; Warren (yellow card) 52'; Matthews (yellow card) 60'	Attendance: 3,828

==== September ====
4 September 2010 7	Kettering Town	1–2	AFC Wimbledon	Rockingham Road
15:00 BST (UTC+01)	Taylor (yellow card) 6'; Graham (yellow card) 12'; Christie 18'; Dempster (yellow card) 74'	Report	Hatton 13' (yellow card) 36'; Kedwell 56'; Blackman (yellow card) 84'; Minshull (yellow card) 90'	Attendance: 1,727

11 September 2010 8	AFC Wimbledon	4–0	Bath City	Kingsmeadow
15:00 BST (UTC+01)	S. Moore 18'; Yakubu 35'; Jolley 66'; Kedwell 69'	Report		Attendance: 3,300

17 September 2010 9	Luton Town	3–0	AFC Wimbledon	Kenilworth Road
19:45 BST (UTC+01)	Pilkington 23'; Kroca 37'; Drury (yellow card) 45'; Barnes-Homer 49'	Report	Blackman (yellow card) 71'	Attendance: 7,238; Referee: Rob Whitton

23 September 2010 10	AFC Wimbledon	2–1	Crawley Town	Kingsmeadow
19:45 BST (UTC+01)	Hatton 77'; Franks (yellow card) 76'; Kedwell 79'; Jackson (yellow card) 88'	Report	Tubbs 43'; Brodie (yellow card) 45'; Wilson (yellow card) 76'; Torres (yellow card) 78'	Attendance: 4,018; Referee: Barratt

26 September 2010 11	Kidderminster Harriers	2–0	AFC Wimbledon	Aggborough
15:00 BST (UTC+01)	McPhee 44'; Williams 84'; Thorne (yellow card) 90'	Report	Franks (yellow card) 40'; Harris (yellow card) 64'	Attendance: 1,565

29 September 2010 12	AFC Wimbledon	3–0	Cambridge United	Kingsmeadow
19:45 BST (UTC+01)	Jolley (yellow card) 40' (goal) 75'; Franks 69' 89'	Report	Willmott (yellow card) 43'; Partridge (yellow card) 44'; Coulson (yellow card) 67'; Saah (yellow card) 86'	Attendance: 3,119

==== October ====
2 October 2010 13	AFC Wimbledon	1–1	Forest Green Rovers	Kingsmeadow
15:00 BST (UTC+01)	S. Moore (yellow card) 62'; Blackman (yellow card) 65'; Jolley 68'	Report	Watson 5'; McDonald (yellow card) 80'	Attendance: 3,204

5 October 2010 14	Mansfield Town	2–5	AFC Wimbledon	Field Mill
19:45 BST (UTC+01)	Connor 34'; Silk (yellow card) 41'; Sandwith (yellow card) 45'; Louis Briscoe 84'	Report	S. Moore 1' 74'; Jolley 9'; Kedwell 43'; Jackson 61'	Attendance: 2,699

9 October 2010 15	Wrexham	1–2	AFC Wimbledon	Racecourse Ground
15:00 BST (UTC+01)	Mangan 27'; Obeng (yellow card) 61'; Blackburn (yellow card) 76'	Report	Hatton (yellow card) 14'; Gregory (yellow card) 38'; Jolley 47'; Jackson (yellow card) 70'; Yussuff 84'	Attendance: 3,277

16 October 2010 16	AFC Wimbledon	1–0	Gateshead	Kingsmeadow
15:00 BST (UTC+01)	Yakubu 72'	Report	Kay (yellow card) 17'	Attendance: 3,330

30 October 2010 17	AFC Wimbledon	0–2	Darlington	Kingsmeadow
15:00 BST (UTC+01)	Kedwell (yellow card) 26'	Report	Senior 14'; Bridge-Wilkinson 59'; Louis (yellow card) 90'	Attendance: 3,952

==== November ====
9 November 2010 18	Altrincham	0–2	AFC Wimbledon	Moss Lane
19:45 GMT	Hewson (yellow card) 90'	Report	Kedwell 1' 45'; Franks (yellow card) 90'	Attendance: 901

13 November 2010 19	Barrow	2–0	AFC Wimbledon	Holker Street
15:00 GMT	Owen 43' (yellow card) 76'; Hulbert (yellow card) 45'; Goodfellow 78'	Report	Hatton (yellow card) 17'; Kedwell (yellow card) 45'; Bush (yellow card) 79'	Attendance: 1,375

21 November 2010 20	AFC Wimbledon	3–2	Kettering Town	Kingsmeadow
15:00 GMT	Moore 11' 18'; Jolley 36'	Report	Solkhon (yellow card) 42' (goal) 53'; Green (yellow card) 60'; Marna (yellow card) 70'; Furlong 80'; Dempster (yellow card) 87'; Noubissie (yellow card) 90'	Attendance: 3,114

==== December ====
28 December 2010 21	AFC Wimbledon	3–0	Eastbourne Borough	Kingsmeadow
19:45 GMT	Nwokeji 45'; Wellard 80'; Hatton (yellow card) 88'; Yussuff 89'	Report	Pacquette (red card) 28'; Smart (yellow card) 33'	Attendance: 3,114

==== January ====
1 January 2011 22	AFC Wimbledon	3–1	Hayes & Yeading United	Kingsmeadow
15:00 GMT	Jackson 51'; Mulley 54'; Franks (yellow card) 64'; Kedwell (yellow card) 79'; L. Moore 86'	Report	Hand (yellow card) 66' (yellow card) 78' (red card); Green (yellow card) 73'; Hyde 75'; Bygrave (yellow card) 79'	Attendance: 3,326

3 January 2011 23	Newport County	3–3	AFC Wimbledon	Newport Stadium
19:45 GMT	Todd 10'; Collins 18' 36'	Report	Mulley 28'; Hatton 47'; Franks (yellow card) 50'; Yussuff 82'	Attendance: 3,462

8 January 2011 24	Darlington	0–0	AFC Wimbledon	The Darlington Arena
15:00 GMT	Hatch (yellow card) 85'	Report		Attendance: 2,046

12 January 2011 25	AFC Wimbledon	0–0	Luton Town	Kingsmeadow
19:45 GMT		Report	Gnapka (yellow card) 21'	Attendance: 4,287

18 January 2011 26	Fleetwood Town	0–0	AFC Wimbledon	Highbury Stadium
19:45 GMT	Vieira 45'	Report	Kedwell 15'	Attendance: 4,287

22 January 2011 27	AFC Wimbledon	5–0	Southport	Kingsmeadow
15:00 GMT	Mulley 20' 90'; L. Moore 50'; S. Moore 56'; Hatton 86' (pen.)	Report	Kissock (yellow card) 49'; Lee (yellow card) 76'; Williams (yellow card) 90'	Attendance: 3,408

25 January 2011 28	Bath City	2–2	AFC Wimbledon	Twerton Park
19:45 GMT	Ruddick (yellow card) 32'; Canham 51'; Murray 85'	Report	Kedwell 32' (pen.); Hudson 45'; Gregory (yellow card) 54'	Attendance: 1,135

28 January 2011 29	Gateshead	0–2	AFC Wimbledon	Gateshead International Stadium
19:45 GMT	Gate (yellow card) 68'	Report	Jolley 47'; Kedwell 77'; Yussuff (yellow card) 80'	Attendance: 922

==== February ====
1 February 2011 30	York City	4–1	AFC Wimbledon	Bootham Crescent
19:45 GMT	Parslow 16'; Meredith 45'; Rankine 70'; Chambers 84'	Report	Hatton (yellow card) 28'; Jolley 63'	Attendance: 2,438

5 February 2011 31	AFC Wimbledon	1–0	Fleetwood Town	Kingsmeadow
19:45 GMT	Gwillim (yellow card) 36'; Jolley 84'; Stuart (yellow card) 90'	Report	Miles (yellow card) 31'; Brown (yellow card) 75' (yellow card) 88' (red card); Gregan (yellow card) 90'	Attendance: 3,298

12 February 2011 32	AFC Wimbledon	1–0	York City	Kingsmeadow
15:00 GMT	Hatton 20'; Gwillim (yellow card) 88'	Report		Attendance: 3,532

19 February 2011 33	Tamworth	2–5	AFC Wimbledon	The Lamb Ground
15:00 GMT	Perry (yellow card) 37'; Wylde (yellow card) 39' (goal) 51'; Bradley 65'; Tait (yellow card) 88'; Marshall (yellow card) 88'	Report	Mulley 18'; Kedwell 50' 89'; Broughton 75' (yellow card) 79'; Yussuff 90'	Attendance: 1,496

22 February 2011 34	AFC Wimbledon	0–1	Wrexham	Kingsmeadow
19:45 GMT	Jackson (yellow card) 69'	Report	Obeng (yellow card) 30'; Taylor (yellow card) 54'; Harris (yellow card) 64'; Mathias Pogba 76'; Ashton (yellow card) 87'	Attendance: 3,486

26 February 2011 35	AFC Wimbledon	4–1	Altrincham	Kingsmeadow
15:00 GMT	Gregory (yellow card) 31'; Kedwell 37' 45' 60'; Broughton 81'	Report	Young (yellow card) 33'; Piergianni (yellow card) 39'; Connors (yellow card) 58' (yellow card) 75' (red card); Joseph 69'; Twiss (yellow card) 87'	Attendance: 3,078

==== March ====
1 March 2011 36	Hayes & Yeading United	0–0	AFC Wimbledon	Kingfield Stadium
19:45 GMT	Yiadom (yellow card) 44'	Report	Stuart (yellow card) 43'	Attendance: 708

5 March 2011 37	Grimsby Town	2–1	AFC Wimbledon	Blundell Park
15:00 GMT	Coulson 37' 53'; Kempson (yellow card) 45'; Hudson (red card) 71'	Report	Yussuff 24'; Franks (yellow card) 70'; Minshull (yellow card) 72'	Attendance: 3,182

12 March 2011 38	AFC Wimbledon	1–2	Kidderminster Harriers	Kingsmeadow
15:00 GMT	Minshull 82'; Mulley (yellow card) 87'	Report	Canham 42' (yellow card) 63'; Matt 74' (yellow card) 74'; Gittings (yellow card) 90'	Attendance: 3,517

18 March 2011 39	Crawley Town	3–1	AFC Wimbledon	Broadfield Stadium
19:45 GMT	Tubbs 5'; McFadzean 89' (yellow card) 19'; Brodie (yellow card) 19'; Hunt (yellow card) 30'; Bulman (red card) 43'; Dance 53'	Report	Broughton (yellow card) 15'; L. Moore (yellow card) 32'; Johnson 39'; Yussuff (yellow card) 67'; Mulley (red card) 90'	Attendance: 4,054

26 March 2011 40	AFC Wimbledon	1–0	Rushden & Diamonds	Kingsmeadow
15:00 GMT	Kedwell 29' (pen.); L. Moore (yellow card) 76'	Report	Johnson (yellow card) 23'; Corcoran (yellow card) 27'	Attendance: 3,069

==== April ====
2 April 2011 41	AFC Wimbledon	2–0	Barrow	Kingsmeadow
15:00 GMT	Johnson 32'; Yussuff (yellow card) 83'	Report	Edwards (yellow card) 83'	Attendance: 3,264

9 April 2011 42	Cambridge United	1–2	AFC Wimbledon	Abbey Stadium
15:00 GMT	Wright (yellow card) 42' (goal) 82'; Liam Hughes (yellow card) 57'; Bentley (yellow card) 77'	Report	Johnson 11'; Mohamed 32'	Attendance: 2,907

16 April 2011 43	Histon	0–4	AFC Wimbledon	Bridge Road
15:00 GMT	Smith (yellow card) 72'	Report	Kedwell 13' 67'; Hatton (yellow card) 59'; L. Moore 63' 64'	Attendance: 750

22 April 2011 44	AFC Wimbledon	2–1	Mansfield Town	Kingsmeadow
15:00 GMT	Stuart 68'; Johnson 86'	Report	Thompson 14'; Murray (yellow card) 26'; Briscoe (yellow card) 74'; Istead (yellow card) 84'	Attendance: 3,613

25 April 2011 45	Forest Green Rovers	0–0	AFC Wimbledon	The New Lawn
19:45 GMT	Armstrong (yellow card) 90'	Report		Attendance: 1,824

30 April 2011 46	AFC Wimbledon	2–1	Grimsby Town	Kingsmeadow
15:00 GMT	L. Moore 7'; Johnson 49'; Main (yellow card) 63'	Report	Connell 39'; Duffy (yellow card) 51'; Wood (yellow card) 68'; I'Anson (yellow card) 72'	Attendance: 3,752

=== Conference National play-offs ===
==== Semi-final ====
6 May 2011 First Leg	Fleetwood Town	0–2	AFC Wimbledon	Highbury Stadium
15:00 BST (UTC+01)	Beeley (yellow card) 45'; Gregan (yellow card) 45'	Report	L. Moore 39'; Kedwell (yellow card) 45'; Yussuff (yellow card) 48'; Mohamed 48'; Hatton (yellow card) 83'	Attendance: 4,112

11 May 2011 Second Leg	AFC Wimbledon	6–1 (8–1 agg.)	Fleetwood Town	Kingsmeadow
19:45 BST (UTC+01)	Mohamed 1' 35' 63'; Kedwell 28'; Jolley 68'; Mulley 80'	Report	Seddon 47'; Linwood (yellow card) 61'	Attendance: 4,538

==== Final ====
21 May 2011 Final	AFC Wimbledon	0–0 (a.e.t.) (4–3 p)	Luton Town	City of Manchester Stadium
15:00 BST (UTC+01)	Johnson (yellow card) 33'; L. Moore (yellow card) 80'; Minshull (yellow card) 108'	Report	Keane (yellow card) 45'; Lawless (yellow card) 54'	Attendance: 18,195; Referee: James Adcock
	Penalties
	Hatton (penalty scored); L. Moore (penalty scored); Mohamed (penalty missed); Yakubu (penalty scored); Kedwell (penalty scored)		(penalty missed) Lawless; (penalty scored) Pilkington; (penalty scored) Newton; (penalty missed) Walker; (penalty scored) Howells

=== FA Cup ===
23 October 2010 4th Qualifying Round	Basingstoke Town	0–1	AFC Wimbledon	The Camrose
15:00 BST (UTC+01)		Report	Gregory (yellow card) 54'; Harris 71'	Attendance: 1,750

6 November 2010 First Round	AFC Wimbledon	0–0	Ebbsfleet United	Kingsmeadow
15:00 GMT	Jolley (red card) 38'	Report	Carew (yellow card) 9' (yellow card) 41' (red card); Easton (yellow card) 42'; Willock (yellow card) 56'; Marwa (yellow card) 61'; Stone (yellow card) 86'	Attendance: 3,219

18 November 2010 First Round Replay	Ebbsfleet United	2–3	AFC Wimbledon	Stonebridge Road
15:00 GMT	Carew 12' 19' (yellow card) 62'; Phipp (yellow card) 90'	Report	Nwokeji 8'; S. Moore (yellow card) 10' (goal) 90' 120'; Kedwell (yellow card) 69'; Gregory (yellow card) 77'	Attendance: 2,306

27 November 2010 Second Round	AFC Wimbledon	0–2	Stevenage	Kingsmeadow
15:00 GMT	Harris (yellow card) 42' (yellow card) 83' (red card)	Report	Walker 24'; Odubade 81'	Attendance: 3,633

=== FA Trophy ===
11 December 2010 First Round	AFC Wimbledon	3–0	Braintree Town	Kingsmeadow
15:00 GMT	Jolley 8'; Nwokeji 86'; Kedwell 88'; Yussuff (yellow card) 90'	Report	Alaile (red card) 24'; Jones (yellow card) 30'; Reason (yellow card) 51'	Attendance: 1,201

15 January 2011 Second Round	AFC Wimbledon	2–3	Woking	Kingsmeadow
15:00 GMT	L. Moore (yellow card) 34'; Nwokeji 38'; Kedwell 71'	Report	Ademola 3' 45'; Sawyer (yellow card) 79'; Hammond 87'	Attendance: 2,259
