= 2010–11 FA Cup =

The Football Association Challenge Cup
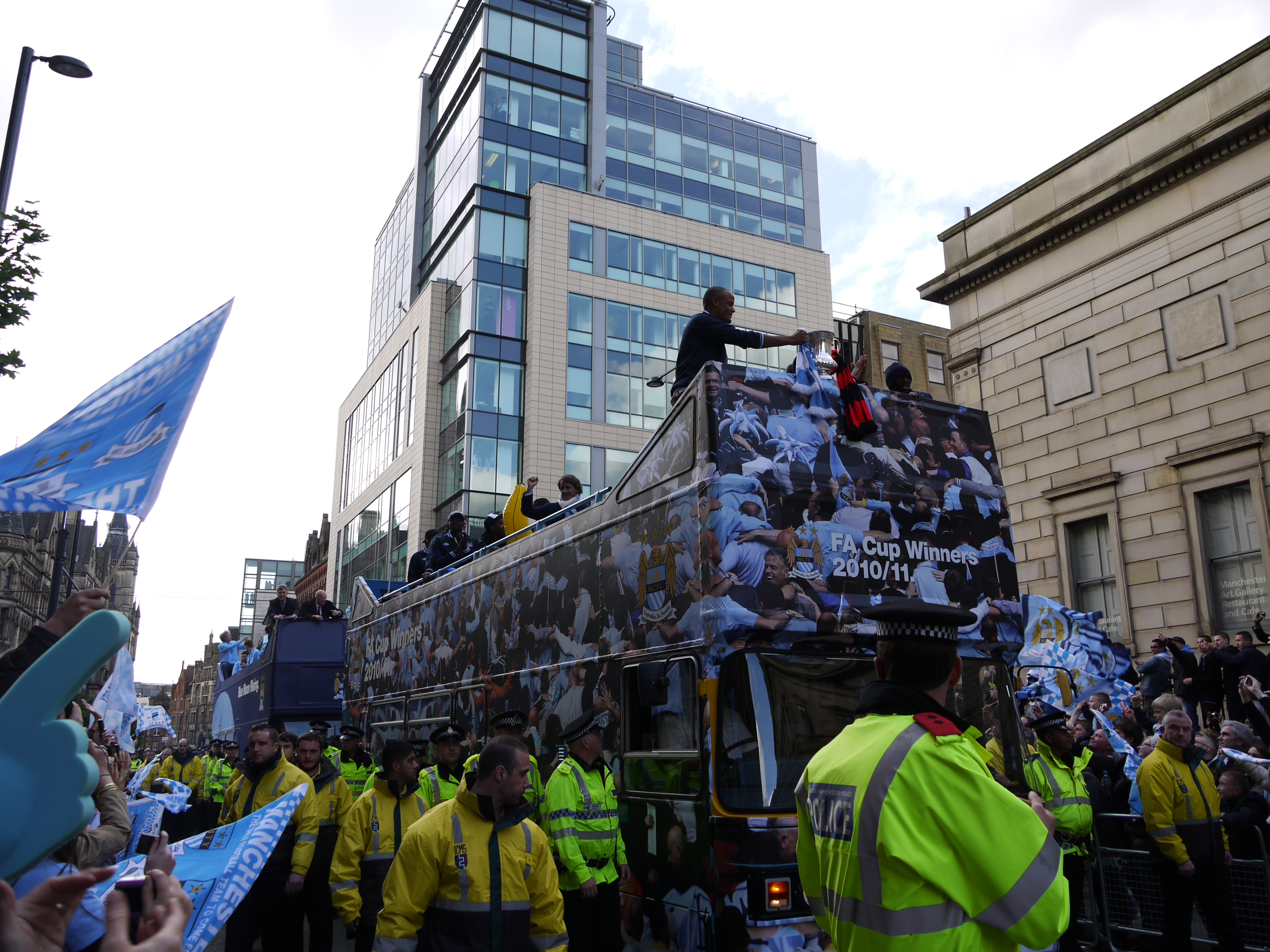
- Manchester City's victory parade following their 5th title

Tournament details
- Country: England; Wales
- Dates: 14 August 2010 – 14 May 2011
- Teams: 759

Final positions
- Champions: Manchester City (5th title)
- Runners-up: Stoke City

Tournament statistics
- Top goal scorer(s): Mathieu Manset; Scott McGleish (6 goals)

The 2010–11 FA Cup (known as the FA Cup sponsored by E.ON for sponsorship reasons) was the 130th season of the world's oldest football knockout competition; the FA Cup. A total of 806 clubs applied to enter of which 759 were accepted, a slight drop compared to the 762 clubs accepted into the 2009–10 competition.

The competition commenced on 14 August 2010 with the Extra preliminary round and concluded on 14 May 2011 with the Final, held at Wembley Stadium. Unusually, this was not the last game of the English domestic season nor the only game played on that day. Wembley Stadium was also hosting the 2011 Champions League Final on 28 May, forcing the FA Cup Final to be played at least two weeks earlier. This meant the Final was played on the penultimate weekend of the Premier League season and, apart from the finalists who were scheduled to play a league match against each other, a full programme of matches was played.

The defending champions were Chelsea, who retained their title in the 2010 final against Portsmouth, but they lost to Everton in the fourth round. The tournament winners were Manchester City, who defeated Stoke City in the final with Yaya Touré scoring the only goal of the match in the 74th minute. The FA Cup winners are normally entitled to a place in the next season's UEFA Europa League unless they have already qualified for that tournament or for the UEFA Champions League; because Manchester City qualified for the 2011–12 UEFA Champions League via their top-four finish in the 2010–11 Premier League, Stoke qualified for the 2011–12 UEFA Europa League as runners-up.

== Teams ==
Round	Clubs remaining	Clubs involved	Winners from previous round	New entries this round	Leagues entering at this round
First Round Proper	124	80	32	48	EFL League One; EFL League Two
Second Round Proper	84	40	40	none	none
Third Round Proper	64	64	20	44	Premier League; EFL Championship
Fourth Round Proper	32	32	32	none	none
Fifth Round Proper	16	16	16	none	none
Sixth Round Proper	8	8	8	none	none
Semi-finals	4	4	4	none	none
Final	2	2	2	none	none

== Calendar ==
The calendar for the 2010–11 FA Cup, as announced by The Football Association:

Round	Main date	Number of fixtures	Clubs	New entries this round	Prize money	Player of the Round
Extra preliminary round	14 August 2010	201	759 → 558	402: 358th–759th	£750	n/a
Preliminary round	28 August 2010	166	558 → 392	131: 227th–357th	£1,500	n/a
First round qualifying	11 September 2010	116	392 → 276	66: 161st–226th	£3,000	Sam Styles (Oxhey Jets)
Second round qualifying	25 September 2010	80	276 → 196	44: 117th–160th	£4,500	Sam Higgins (Chelmsford City)
Third round qualifying	9 October 2010	40	196 → 156	none	£7,500	Justin Marsden (Nuneaton Town)
Fourth round qualifying	23 October 2010	32	156 → 124	24: 93rd–116th	£12,500	Amari Morgan-Smith (Luton Town)
First Round Proper	6 November 2010	40	124 → 84	48: 45th–92nd	£18,000	Jake Cottrell (FC United of Manchester)
Second Round Proper	27 November 2010	20	84 → 64	none	£27,000	Sam Ashton (FC United of Manchester)
Third Round Proper	8 January 2011	32	64 → 32	44: 1st–44th	£67,500	Kasper Schmeichel (Leeds United)
Fourth Round Proper	29 January 2011	16	32 → 16	none	£90,000	Neal Bishop (Notts County)
Fifth Round Proper	19 February 2011	8	16 → 8	none	£180,000	Matthew Mills (Reading F.C.)
Sixth Round Proper	12–13 March 2011	4	8 → 4	none	£360,000	Kevin Davies (Bolton Wanderers F.C.)
Semi-finals	16–17 April 2011	2	4 → 2	none	£450,000	Joe Hart (Manchester City)
Final	14 May 2011	1	2 → 1	none	Winner: £1,800,000; Runner-up: £900,000	Mario Balotelli (Manchester City)

== Qualifying rounds ==
All teams that entered the competition, but were not members of the Premier League or The Football League, competed in the qualifying rounds to secure one of 32 places available in the first round proper.

The winners from the fourth qualifying round were Darlington, Tipton Town, Guiseley, Fleetwood Town, Gateshead, Vauxhall Motors, FC United of Manchester, Nuneaton Town, Tamworth, York City, Mansfield Town, Southport, Eastwood Town, Droylsden, Woking, Hythe Town, Cambridge United, Dover Athletic, Harrow Borough, Corby Town, Luton Town, Rushden & Diamonds, Crawley Town, Hendon, Dartford, Chelmsford City, AFC Wimbledon, Havant & Waterlooville, Swindon Supermarine, Forest Green Rovers, Ebbsfleet United and Hayes & Yeading United.

Tipton Town, FC United of Manchester, Hythe Town and Swindon Supermarine were appearing in the competition proper for the first time. Hayes & Yeading United was also featuring at this stage for the first time as a merged entity (although predecessor clubs Hayes FC and Yeading FC had both qualified for the first round back in 2004-05). Of the others, Guiseley and Dover Athletic had last appeared in the first round in 2002-03, Harrow Borough had last done so in 2000-01, Hendon had last done so in 1999-2000, Dartford in 1989-90 and Corby Town in 1967-68.

== First Round Proper ==
Teams from Leagues One and Two entered at this stage, along with the winners from the Fourth round qualifying. The draw was held on 24 October 2010 with ties played on the weekend of 6–7 November 2010 apart from Rochdale vs FC United of Manchester which was the only match played on 5 November 2010. It was broadcast on ESPN kicking off its FA Cup campaign with the Northern Premier League club shocking their League One counterparts 3–2. ESPN's next match was on 6 November 2010, where Cambridge United and Huddersfield Town played out a scoreless draw. ITV1's first coverage was Southport vs Sheffield Wednesday on 7 November 2010 with the League One side trouncing their Conference National opponents 5–2.

Tipton Town of the Midland Football Alliance and Hythe Town of the Kent League, both from the ninth tier, were the lowest-ranked teams left in the competition at this stage. Both suffered heavy defeats at the hands of League opponents.

6 November 2010	Colchester United (3)	4–3	Bradford City (4)	Colchester
15:00 GMT	Bond 7'; Mooney 20', 64' (pen.); Wilson 54'	(Report)	Hanson 8', 79'; Syers 32'	Stadium: Colchester Community Stadium; Attendance: 2,736; Referee: Iain Williamson

6 November 2010	Corby Town (6)	1–1	Luton Town (5)	Corby
15:00 GMT	Mackey 14'	(Report)	Barnes-Homer 83'	Stadium: Rockingham Triangle; Attendance: 2,000; Referee: Andy Penn

17 November 2010 Replay	Luton Town (5)	4–2	Corby Town (6)	Luton
19:45 GMT	Barnes-Homer 5'; Atieno 29', 62'; Gnakpa 81'	(Report)	Walker 84'; Hope 86'; Jarman (red card) 25'	Stadium: Kenilworth Road; Attendance: 3,050; Referee: Chris Sarginson

6 November 2010	Harrow Borough (7)	0–2	Chesterfield (4)	Harrow, London
14:00 GMT		(Report)	Boden 74'; Davies 90+3'	Stadium: Earlsmead Stadium; Attendance: 2,500; Referee: Andy Woolmer

6 November 2010	Notts County (3)	2–0	Gateshead (5)	Nottingham
15:00 GMT	Davies 22' (pen.); Rodgers 83'	(Report)		Stadium: Meadow Lane; Attendance: 3,235; Referee: Wayne Barratt

6 November 2010	Stevenage (4)	0–0	Milton Keynes Dons (3)	Stevenage
15:00 GMT		(Report)		Stadium: Broadhall Way; Attendance: 2,956; Referee: Robert Lewis

16 November 2010 Replay	Milton Keynes Dons (3)	1–1 (a.e.t.) (6–7 p)	Stevenage (4)	Milton Keynes
19:45 GMT	Guy 49'	(Report)	Charles 90+5'	Stadium: Stadium:mk; Attendance: 3,977; Referee: Gavin Ward
	Penalties
	Baldock (penalty scored); Gleeson (penalty scored); Carrington (penalty scored); MacKenzie (penalty scored); Leven (penalty missed); O'Hanlon (penalty scored); Lewington (penalty scored); Kouo-Doumbé (penalty missed)		Griffin (penalty scored); Laird (penalty missed); Mousinho (penalty scored); Charles (penalty scored); Long (penalty scored); Odubade (penalty scored); Roberts (penalty scored); Wilson (penalty scored)

7 November 2010	Southport (5)	2–5	Sheffield Wednesday (3)	Southport
12:00 GMT	Barratt 52'; McGinn 58'	(Report)	Teale 11'; Mellor 54'; Morrison 61', 62'; Spurr 64'	Stadium: Haig Avenue; Attendance: 4,490; Referee: Carl Boyeson

6 November 2010	Rotherham United (4)	0–0	York City (5)	Sheffield
15:00 GMT		(Report)		Stadium: Don Valley Stadium; Attendance: 3,227; Referee: Karl Evans

17 November 2010 Replay	York City (5)	3–0	Rotherham United (4)	York
19:45 GMT	Smith 66'; Rankine 71' (pen.), 79'	(Report)		Stadium: Bootham Crescent; Attendance: 2,644; Referee: David Coote

6 November 2010	Havant & Waterlooville (6)	0–2	Droylsden (6)	Havant
15:00 GMT		(Report)	Hardiker 57'; Kilheeney 89'	Stadium: West Leigh Park; Attendance: 1,102; Referee: Kevin Johnson

6 November 2010	Bury (4)	2–0	Exeter City (3)	Bury
15:00 GMT	Sodje 28'; Lees 53'	(Report)		Stadium: Gigg Lane; Attendance: 2,359; Referee: Oliver Langford

6 November 2010	Cheltenham Town (4)	1–0	Morecambe (4)	Cheltenham
15:00 GMT	Thomas 80'	(Report)		Stadium: Whaddon Road; Attendance: 2,066; Referee: Craig Pawson

6 November 2010	Hayes & Yeading United (5)	1–2	Wycombe Wanderers (4)	Hayes, London
15:00 GMT	Holmes 70'	(Report)	Beavon 61'; Ainsworth 90+5'	Stadium: Church Road; Attendance: 1,426; Referee: Dave Phillips

6 November 2010	Dagenham & Redbridge (3)	1–1	Leyton Orient (3)	Dagenham, London
15:00 GMT	Green 45+2'	(Report)	Revell 45'	Stadium: Victoria Road; Attendance: 3,378; Referee: Steve Rushton

16 November 2010 Replay	Leyton Orient (3)	3–2	Dagenham & Redbridge (3)	Leyton, London
19:45 GMT	McGleish 2', 76'; Revell 24'	(Report)	Green 67' (pen.); Taiwo 68'	Stadium: Brisbane Road; Attendance: 2,901; Referee: Simon Hooper

6 November 2010	AFC Wimbledon (5)	0–0	Ebbsfleet United (6)	Kingston upon Thames, London
15:00 GMT	Jolley (red card) 37'	(Report)	Carew (red card) 42'	Stadium: Kingsmeadow; Attendance: 3,219; Referee: Andy Davies

18 November 2010 Replay	Ebbsfleet United (6)	2–3 (a.e.t.)	AFC Wimbledon (5)	Northfleet
19:45 GMT	Carew 12' (pen.), 18'	(Report)	Nwokeji 9'; Moore 90+4', 120+1'	Stadium: Stonebridge Road; Attendance: 2,306; Referee: Keith Hill

6 November 2010	Lincoln City (4)	1–0	Nuneaton Town (6)	Lincoln
15:00 GMT	Jarrett 90'; Keltie (red card) 44'	(Report)		Stadium: Sincil Bank; Attendance: 3,084; Referee: Carl Berry

6 November 2010	Mansfield Town (5)	0–1	Torquay United (4)	Mansfield
15:00 GMT		(Report)	Benyon 87'	Stadium: Field Mill; Attendance: 2,179; Referee: Michael Naylor

6 November 2010	Hereford United (4)	5–1	Hythe Town (9)	Hereford
15:00 GMT	Rose 8'; Purdie 21'; Manset 39', 44'; Fleetwood 90+3'	(Report)	Mickelborough 26'	Stadium: Edgar Street; Attendance: 2,217; Referee: Andy D'Urso

6 November 2010	AFC Bournemouth (3)	5–3	Tranmere Rovers (3)	Bournemouth
15:00 GMT	McQuoid 1', 4', 57'; Pugh 7'; Feeney 61'	(Report)	Cresswell 27'; Goodison 42'; Thomas-Moore 53'	Stadium: Dean Court; Attendance: 3,951; Referee: Brendan Malone

6 November 2010	Chelmsford City (6)	3–2	Hendon (7)	Chelmsford
15:00 GMT	Higgins 8'; Bricknell 28'; Cook 68'; Pullen (red card) 41'	(Report)	Busby 43' (pen.), 80'	Stadium: Melbourne Stadium; Attendance: 1,685; Referee: Andy Hendley

6 November 2010	Swindon Supermarine (7)	2–1	Eastwood Town (6)	South Marston
15:00 GMT	Holgate 16'; Wells 27'	(Report)	Stevenson 47'	Stadium: Hunts Copse; Attendance: 2,603; Referee: John Hopkins

6 November 2010	Rushden & Diamonds (5)	0–1	Yeovil Town (3)	Irthlingborough
15:00 GMT		(Report)	Williams 83'	Stadium: Nene Park; Attendance: 1,666; Referee: Mark Brown

6 November 2010	Southampton (3)	2–0	Shrewsbury Town (4)	Southampton
15:00 GMT	Connolly 90+2'; Lallana 90+2'	(Report)		Stadium: St Mary's Stadium; Attendance: 10,410; Referee: Grant Hegley

6 November 2010	Cambridge United (5)	0–0	Huddersfield Town (3)	Cambridge
17:30 GMT		(Report)		Stadium: Abbey Stadium; Attendance: 3,127; Referee: Paul Tierney

16 November 2010 Replay	Huddersfield Town (3)	2–1	Cambridge United (5)	Huddersfield
19:45 GMT	Peltier 90+1'; Roberts 90+4'	(Report)	McAuley 53'	Stadium: Galpharm Stadium; Attendance: 3,766; Referee: Graham Salisbury

7 November 2010	Burton Albion (4)	1–0	Oxford United (4)	Burton upon Trent
15:00 GMT	Webster 85'	(Report)		Stadium: Pirelli Stadium; Attendance: 2,483; Referee: Garry Sutton

6 November 2010	Gillingham (4)	0–2	Dover Athletic (6)	Gillingham
15:00 GMT	Nutter (red card) 70'	(Report)	Birchall 18'; I'Anson 28'	Stadium: Priestfield Stadium; Attendance: 7,475; Referee: Darren Deadman

6 November 2010	Tamworth (5)	2–1	Crewe Alexandra (4)	Tamworth
15:00 GMT	Rodman 11'; Thomas 55'	(Report)	Westwood 88'	Stadium: The Lamb Ground; Attendance: 1,776; Referee: Graham Scott

6 November 2010	Darlington (5)	2–1	Bristol Rovers (3)	Darlington
15:00 GMT	Brough 14'; Smith 57'	(Report)	Hoskins 17'	Stadium: The Darlington Arena; Attendance: 1,602; Referee: Jock Waugh

6 November 2010	Guiseley (6)	0–5	Crawley Town (5)	Guiseley
15:00 GMT		(Report)	Tubbs 15'; Neilson 36'; Hall 56'; Brodie 72'; Torres 75'	Stadium: Nethermoor Park; Attendance: 1,609; Referee: Peter Bankes

6 November 2010	Brighton & Hove Albion (3)	0–0	Woking (6)	Brighton
15:00 GMT		(Report)		Stadium: Withdean Stadium; Attendance: 5,868; Referee: Mick Russell

16 November 2010 Replay	Woking (6)	2–2 (a.e.t.) (0–3 p)	Brighton & Hove Albion (3)	Woking
19:45 GMT	Greer 72' (o.g.); Sogbanmu 103'	(Report)	Sparrow 57'; Bennett 105'; Taricco (red card) 105+3'	Stadium: Kingfield Stadium; Attendance: 4,193; Referee: Roger East
	Penalties
	Sogbanmu (penalty missed); Faulconbridge (penalty missed); Hammond (penalty missed)		Murray (penalty scored); Sparrow (penalty scored); Battipiedi (penalty missed); Baz (penalty scored)

6 November 2010	Macclesfield Town (4)	2–2	Southend United (4)	Macclesfield
15:00 GMT	Daniel 8'; Brown 47'	(Report)	German 33' (pen.); Corr 76'	Stadium: Moss Rose; Attendance: 1,582; Referee: Bobby Madley

16 November 2010 Replay	Southend United (4)	2–2 (a.e.t.) (3–5 p)	Macclesfield Town (4)	Southend-on-Sea
19:45 GMT	Simpson 87'; Corr 105+1'	(Report)	Sinclair 61'; Nsiala 99'	Stadium: Roots Hall; Attendance: 2,194; Referee: Dean Whitestone
	Penalties
	German (penalty scored); Corr (penalty missed); Clohessy (penalty scored); Hall (penalty scored)		Chalmers (penalty scored); Barnett (penalty scored); Bencherif (penalty scored); Reid (penalty scored); Brown (penalty scored)

5 November 2010	Rochdale (3)	2–3	FC United of Manchester (7)	Rochdale
19:45 GMT	Elding 53'; Dawson 78'	(Report)	Platt 42'; Cottrell 49'; Norton 90+4'	Stadium: Spotland Stadium; Attendance: 7,048; Referee: Geoff Eltringham

6 November 2010	Carlisle United (3)	6–0	Tipton Town (9)	Carlisle
15:00 GMT	Zoko 5', 19'; Madine 9', 12', 41', 82'	(Report)		Stadium: Brunton Park; Attendance: 4,241; Referee: Andy Madley

6 November 2010	Dartford (6)	1–1	Port Vale (4)	Dartford
15:00 GMT	Bradbrook 39'	(Report)	McCombe 84'	Stadium: Princes Park; Attendance: 3,679; Referee: Phil Gibbs

16 November 2010 Replay	Port Vale (4)	4–0	Dartford (6)	Burslem
19:45 GMT	M. Richards 17' (pen.), 26'; Rigg 57'; J. Richards 72'	(Report)		Stadium: Vale Park; Attendance: 3,590; Referee: Mark Haywood

6 November 2010	Forest Green Rovers (5)	0–3	Northampton Town (4)	Nailsworth
15:00 GMT		(Report)	Johnson 30'; Guinan 40'; Jacobs 76'	Stadium: The New Lawn; Attendance: 1,479; Referee: James Linington

6 November 2010	Fleetwood Town (5)	1–1	Walsall (3)	Fleetwood
15:00 GMT	Mullan 50'	(Report)	Richards 4'; McGivern (red card) 40'	Stadium: Highbury Stadium; Attendance: 2,319; Referee: Peter Quinn

16 November 2010 Replay	Walsall (3)	2–0	Fleetwood Town (5)	Walsall
19:45 GMT	Reid 58', 90+3'	(Report)		Stadium: Bescot Stadium; Attendance: 2,056; Referee: Russell Booth

6 November 2010	Barnet (4)	0–0	Charlton Athletic (3)	Chipping Barnet, London
15:00 GMT		(Report)		Stadium: Underhill Stadium; Attendance: 2,684; Referee: Darren Drysdale

16 November 2010 Replay	Charlton Athletic (3)	1–0	Barnet (4)	Charlton, London
19:45 GMT	Reid 18'	(Report)		Stadium: The Valley; Attendance: 4,803; Referee: Kevin Wright

6 November 2010	Plymouth Argyle (3)	0–4	Swindon Town (3)	Plymouth
15:00 GMT	Parrett (red card) 45+2'	(Report)	Morrison 23'; Austin 41'; Péricard 52'; Ritchie 69'	Stadium: Home Park; Attendance: 5,226; Referee: Darren Sheldrake

6 November 2010	Accrington Stanley (4)	3–2	Oldham Athletic (3)	Accrington
15:00 GMT	Putterill 8', 52'; Ryan 36'	(Report)	Feeney 69'; Stephens 75' (pen.)	Stadium: Crown Ground; Attendance: 2,275; Referee: David Webb

6 November 2010	Hartlepool United (3)	0–0	Vauxhall Motors (6)	Hartlepool
15:00 GMT	Humphreys (red card) 87'	(Report)		Stadium: Victoria Park; Attendance: 2,381; Referee: Steve Martin

16 November 2010 Replay	Vauxhall Motors (6)	0–1	Hartlepool United (3)	Ellesmere Port
19:45 GMT		(Report)	Brown 70'	Stadium: Rivacre Park; Attendance: 2,406; Referee: Trevor Kettle

6 November 2010	Stockport County (4)	1–1	Peterborough United (3)	Stockport
15:00 GMT	Griffin 20'	(Report)	McLean 28'	Stadium: Edgeley Park; Attendance: 2,001; Referee: Andy Haines

16 November 2010 Replay	Peterborough United (3)	4–1	Stockport County (4)	Peterborough
19:45 GMT	Langmead 27'; Mackail-Smith 47'; Tomlin 56'; McLean 90+4'	(Report)	Tansey 72'	Stadium: London Road Stadium; Attendance: 2,312; Referee: Stuart Attwell

6 November 2010	Brentford (3)	1–1	Aldershot Town (4)	Brentford, London
15:00 GMT	MacDonald 20'	(Report)	Small 13'	Stadium: Griffin Park; Attendance: 4,090; Referee: Russell Booth

16 November 2010 Replay	Aldershot Town (4)	1–0	Brentford (3)	Aldershot
19:45 GMT	Small 8'	(Report)		Stadium: Recreation Ground; Attendance: 3,627; Referee: Pat Miller

== Second Round Proper ==
The matches were played on 26, 27 and 29 November 2010 with replays scheduled for 7, 8 and 9 December. Hartlepool United v Yeovil Town and Notts County v AFC Bournemouth were both postponed on their original date, 27 November, and again on 7 December. They were finally played on 14 December.

FC United of Manchester of the Northern Premier League Premier Division and Swindon Supermarine of the Southern League Premier Division, both from the seventh tier, were the lowest-ranked teams left in the competition at this stage. Swindon Supermarine were narrowly defeated 1–0 by Colchester United, but FC United of Manchester managed to force a replay after a 1–1 draw with Brighton & Hove Albion.

The draw for the second round was notable for the potential meeting of AFC Wimbledon and MK Dons. This would have been the first time the two clubs had met however MK Dons were beaten by Stevenage in their first-round replay.

27 November 2010	Sheffield Wednesday (3)	3–2	Northampton Town (4)	Sheffield
15:00 GMT	Beevers 6'; Miller 37' (pen.), 90+2' (pen.)	(Report)	McKay 56'; Thornton 90+4'	Stadium: Hillsborough Stadium; Attendance: 8,932; Referee: David Foster

27 November 2010	Burton Albion (4)	3–1	Chesterfield (4)	Burton upon Trent
15:00 GMT	Webster 11'; Maghoma 22'; Collins 90+4'	(Report)	Bowery 90+1'	Stadium: Pirelli Stadium; Attendance: 3,881; Referee: Mark Brown

27 November 2010	Huddersfield Town (3)	6–0	Macclesfield Town (4)	Huddersfield
15:00 GMT	Rhodes 19'; Pilkington 35'; Afobe 45+1'; McCombe 49'; Kay 53'; Roberts 73'	(Report)		Stadium: Galpharm Stadium; Attendance: 4,924; Referee: Carl Boyeson

27 November 2010	AFC Wimbledon (5)	0–2	Stevenage (4)	Kingston upon Thames, London
12:50 GMT	Harris (red card) 83'	(Report)	Walker 24'; Odubade 81'	Stadium: Kingsmeadow; Attendance: 3,633; Referee: Keith Stroud

14 December 2010	Hartlepool United (3)	4–2	Yeovil Town (3)	Hartlepool
19:45 GMT	Sweeney 35', 40', 59'; Humphreys 49'	(Report)	A. Williams 18'; Upson 31'	Stadium: Victoria Park; Attendance: 1,914; Referee: Bobby Madley

27 November 2010	Bury (4)	1–2	Peterborough United (3)	Bury
15:00 GMT	Lowe 51'	(Report)	Tomlin 13'; Mackail-Smith 38'	Stadium: Gigg Lane; Attendance: 2,514; Referee: Jon Moss

14 December 2010	Notts County (3)	3–1	AFC Bournemouth (3)	Nottingham
19:45 GMT	Pearce 18'; Hughes 35'; Cummings 45' (og.)	(Report)	Fletcher 84'	Stadium: Meadow Lane; Attendance: 2,881; Referee: Neil Swarbrick

29 November 2010	Droylsden (6)	1–1	Leyton Orient (3)	Droylsden
19:45 GMT	Kilheeney 24'	(Report)	McGleish 73'	Stadium: Butcher's Arms Ground; Attendance: 1,762; Referee: Colin Webster

7 December 2010 Replay	Leyton Orient (3)	8–2 (a.e.t.)	Droylsden (6)	Leyton, London
19:45 GMT	Chorley 77' (pen.) (yellow card) 79' (yellow-red card) 90'; Téhoué 89', 99', 107'; M'Poku 93'; McGleish 97', 108', 119'; Forbes (red card) 37'	(Report)	Kilheeney 6'; Brown 54'; Kerr (red card) 84'; Roche (yellow card) 11' (yellow-red card) 94'	Stadium: Brisbane Road; Attendance: 1,345; Referee: Graham Scott

26 November 2010	Crawley Town (5)	1–1	Swindon Town (3)	Crawley
19:45 GMT	Tubbs 76'	(Report)	Austin 66'	Stadium: Broadfield Stadium; Attendance: 3,895; Referee: Rob Shoebridge

7 December 2010 Replay	Swindon Town (3)	2–3 (a.e.t.)	Crawley Town (5)	Swindon
19:45 GMT	McGovern 18'; Austin 41'; Douglas (red card) 45+2'	(Report)	B. Smith 16', 118'; P. Smith 69' (o.g.)	Stadium: County Ground; Attendance: 2,955; Referee: Phil Crossley

27 November 2010	Brighton & Hove Albion (3)	1–1	FC United of Manchester (7)	Brighton
15:00 GMT	Taricco 83'	(Report)	Platt 40'; McManus (red card) 70'	Stadium: Withdean Stadium; Attendance: 5,362; Referee: Dean Whitestone

8 December 2010 Replay	FC United of Manchester (7)	0–4	Brighton & Hove Albion (3)	Bury
19:45 GMT		(Report)	Sandaza 25'; Calderón 45+3'; Bennett 86'; Sparrow 90'	Stadium: Gigg Lane; Attendance: 6,900; Referee: Eddie Ilderton

27 November 2010	Southampton (3)	3–0	Cheltenham Town (4)	Southampton
15:00 GMT	Lallana 8'; Guly 50'; Gobern 87'	(Report)		Stadium: St Mary's Stadium; Attendance: 9,276; Referee: Stuart Attwell

27 November 2010	Torquay United (4)	1–0	Walsall (3)	Torquay
15:00 GMT	Kee 41' (pen.)	(Report)		Stadium: Plainmoor; Attendance: 2,334; Referee: Danny McDermid

27 November 2010	Charlton Athletic (3)	2–2	Luton Town (5)	Charlton, London
15:00 GMT	Anyinsah 6'; Jackson 34'	(Report)	Drury 30', 83'	Stadium: The Valley; Attendance: 8,682; Referee: Oliver Langford

9 December 2010 Replay	Luton Town (5)	1–3	Charlton Athletic (3)	Luton
19:45 GMT	Kroča 38'	(Report)	Wagstaff 44'; Anyinsah 66'; Jackson 80'	Stadium: Kenilworth Road; Attendance: 5,914; Referee: Steve Tanner

27 November 2010	Colchester United (3)	1–0	Swindon Supermarine (7)	Colchester
15:00 GMT	Mooney 21'	(Report)		Stadium: Colchester Community Stadium; Attendance: 3,047; Referee: Dave Phillips

27 November 2010	Hereford United (4)	2–2	Lincoln City (4)	Hereford
15:00 GMT	Purdie 23'; Manset 86' (pen.)	(Report)	Grimes 19'; Carayol 27'	Stadium: Edgar Street; Attendance: 1,803; Referee: Iain Williamson

8 January 2011 Replay	Lincoln City (4)	3–4	Hereford United (4)	Lincoln
15:00 GMT	Clapham 6'; Facey 24'; Grimes 48'	(Report)	Manset 4', 72'; Fleetwood 36', 43'	Stadium: Sincil Bank; Attendance: 1,794; Referee: Scott Mathieson

26 November 2010	Port Vale (4)	1–0	Accrington Stanley (4)	Burslem
19:45 GMT	J.Richards 24'	(Report)		Stadium: Vale Park; Attendance: 4,016; Referee: Darren Sheldrake

27 November 2010	Wycombe Wanderers (4)	3–1	Chelmsford City (6)	High Wycombe
15:00 GMT	Rendell 22', 73'; Beavon 84'	(Report)	Higgins 59'	Stadium: Adams Park; Attendance: 3,205; Referee: Robert Lewis

27 November 2010	Carlisle United (3)	3–2	Tamworth (5)	Carlisle
15:00 GMT	Madine 50'; Zoko 86'; Chester 90'	(Report)	Marshall 30'; Thomas 85'	Stadium: Brunton Park; Attendance: 3,599; Referee: Scott Mathieson

27 November 2010	Dover Athletic (6)	2–0	Aldershot Town (4)	River
15:00 GMT	Birchall 54', 90' (pen.)	(Report)		Stadium: Crabble Athletic Ground; Attendance: 4,123; Referee: Brendan Malone

27 November 2010	Darlington (5)	0–2	York City (5)	Darlington
15:00 GMT		(Report)	Sangare 44'; Chambers 90+3'	Stadium: The Darlington Arena; Attendance: 2,500; Referee: Paul Tierney

== Third Round Proper ==
The draw was held on 28 November 2010 at Wembley Stadium and made by Noel Gallagher of Oasis and Sergio Pizzorno of Kasabian. who bizarrely picked out the balls of the respective clubs that they support (Pizzorno - Leicester City and Gallagher - Manchester City). Premier League and Football League Championship teams also entered at this stage, joining the winners from the second round and completing the entrants. The lowest ranked team in this round was Dover Athletic of the Conference South, the sixth tier of English football. The tie between Wycombe Wanderers and Hereford United was played later than usual due to the fact that the second round replay between Lincoln City and Hereford was delayed. Arsenal narrowly avoided an upset by scoring a stoppage time penalty in their 1–1 draw with Championship side Leeds United. The highly anticipated match in the third round between Manchester United and Liverpool saw United beat Liverpool 1–0 with a Ryan Giggs second-minute penalty. Championship side Leeds United failed to maintain their good showing against Arsenal by losing 3–1. Also Newcastle suffered a massive upset, losing 3–1 to League Two Stevenage.

8 January 2011	Burnley (2)	4–2	Port Vale (4)	Burnley
15:00 GMT	Carlisle 4'; Mears 21'; Eagles 50'; Alexander 76' (pen.)	Report	R. Taylor 15', 82'	Stadium: Turf Moor; Attendance: 9,442; Referee: Ilderton

8 January 2011	Coventry City (2)	2–1	Crystal Palace (2)	Coventry
15:00 GMT	Eastwood 15'; Baker 17'	Report	Danns 81'	Stadium: Ricoh Arena; Attendance: 8,162; Referee: Pawson

8 January 2011	Bristol City (2)	0–3	Sheffield Wednesday (3)	Bristol
15:00 GMT		Report	Teale 49'; Mellor 55'; Morrison 65'	Stadium: Ashton Gate Stadium; Attendance: 11,378; Referee: Sheldrake

8 January 2011	Fulham (1)	6–2	Peterborough United (3)	Fulham, London
15:00 GMT	Kamara 32', 59', 76'; Etuhu 45'; Gera 66'; Greening 89'	Report	Tomlin 71'; McCann 86' (pen.)	Stadium: Craven Cottage; Attendance: 15,936; Referee: Lee Mason

8 January 2011	Doncaster Rovers (2)	2–2	Wolverhampton Wanderers (1)	Doncaster
15:00 GMT	Sharp 41'; Hayter 43'	Report	Milijaš 38'; Hunt 58' (pen.); Elokobi (red card) 77'	Stadium: Keepmoat Stadium; Attendance: 8,616; Referee: Taylor

18 January 2011 Replay	Wolverhampton Wanderers (1)	5–0	Doncaster Rovers (2)	Wolverhampton
19:45 GMT	Fletcher 5'; Mujangi Bia 61'; Doyle 66'; Jarvis 74'; Jones 90+3'	Report		Stadium: Molineux Stadium; Attendance: 10,031; Referee: Friend

8 January 2011	Brighton & Hove Albion (3)	3–1	Portsmouth (2)	Brighton
15:00 GMT	Wood 26'; Barnes 45' (pen.); Sandaza 90+1'	Report	Kilbey 88'; Kitson (red card) 14'	Stadium: Withdean Stadium; Attendance: 7,792; Referee: Scott

8 January 2011	Huddersfield Town (3)	2–0	Dover Athletic (6)	Huddersfield
15:00 GMT	Arfield 7'; Roberts 8'	Report		Stadium: Galpharm Stadium; Attendance: 7,894; Referee: Bates

8 January 2011	West Ham United (1)	2–0	Barnsley (2)	Upton Park, London
15:00 GMT	Spector 29'; Piquionne 90+4'	Report		Stadium: Boleyn Ground; Attendance: 32,159; Referee: Swarbrick

8 January 2011	Reading (2)	1–0	West Bromwich Albion (1)	Reading
15:00 GMT	Long 41'	Report	Olsson (red card) 60'	Stadium: Madejski Stadium; Attendance: 13,005; Referee: Moss

8 January 2011	Arsenal (1)	1–1	Leeds United (2)	Holloway, London
12:45 GMT	Fàbregas 90' (pen.)	Report	Snodgrass 54' (pen.)	Stadium: Emirates Stadium; Attendance: 59,520; Referee: Dowd

19 January 2011 Replay	Leeds United (2)	1–3	Arsenal (1)	Leeds
20:00 GMT	Johnson 37'	Report	Nasri 5'; Sagna 35'; Van Persie 76'	Stadium: Elland Road; Attendance: 38,232; Referee: Dean

8 January 2011	Sheffield United (2)	1–3	Aston Villa (1)	Sheffield
15:00 GMT	Ward 48' (pen.)	Report	Walker 9'; Albrighton 33'; Petrov 90+3'; A. Young (yellow card) 62' (red card) 77'	Stadium: Bramall Lane; Attendance: 16,888; Referee: Jones

9 January 2011	Leicester City (2)	2–2	Manchester City (1)	Leicester
16:00 GMT	Bamba 1'; King 64'	Report	Milner 23'; Tevez 45'	Stadium: Walkers Stadium; Attendance: 31,200; Referee: Dean

18 January 2011 Replay	Manchester City (1)	4–2	Leicester City (2)	Manchester
19:45 GMT	Tevez 15'; Vieira 37'; A. Johnson 38'; Kolarov 90'	Report	Gallagher 19' (pen.); Dyer 83'	Stadium: City of Manchester Stadium; Attendance: 27,755; Referee: Halsey

8 January 2011	Bolton Wanderers (1)	2–0	York City (5)	Horwich
15:00 GMT	Davies 83'; Elmander 89'	Report		Stadium: Reebok Stadium; Attendance: 13,120; Referee: Hill

8 January 2011	Blackburn Rovers (1)	1–0	Queens Park Rangers (2)	Blackburn
15:00 GMT	Hoilett 77'	Report		Stadium: Ewood Park; Attendance: 10,284; Referee: Walton

8 January 2011	Swansea City (2)	4–0	Colchester United (3)	Swansea
15:00 GMT	Monk 25'; Pratley 35'; Van der Gun 68'; Sinclair 82'	Report		Stadium: Liberty Stadium; Attendance: 7,005; Referee: Shoebridge

8 January 2011	Stevenage (4)	3–1	Newcastle United (1)	Stevenage
17:30 GMT	Williamson 50' (o.g.); Bostwick 55'; Winn 90+3'	Report	Barton 90+2'; Tioté (red card) 70'	Stadium: Broadhall Way; Attendance: 6,644; Referee: Marriner

8 January 2011	Burton Albion (4)	2–1	Middlesbrough (2)	Burton upon Trent
15:00 GMT	Harrad 82', 90+4'	Report	O'Neil 58'	Stadium: Pirelli Stadium; Attendance: 5,236; Referee: Tanner

8 January 2011	Millwall (2)	1–4	Birmingham City (1)	Bermondsey, London
15:00 GMT	Schofield 90+1'	Report	Derbyshire 17', 45'; Murphy 27'; Jerome 72'	Stadium: The Den; Attendance: 9,841; Referee: Probert

8 January 2011	Southampton (3)	2–0	Blackpool (1)	Southampton
15:00 GMT	Barnard 53'; Do Prado 88'	Report		Stadium: St Mary's Stadium; Attendance: 21,464; Referee: Danny McDermid

8 January 2011	Watford (2)	4–1	Hartlepool United (3)	Watford
15:00 GMT	Mingoia 66'; Sordell 68', 82'; Graham 90'	Report	Sweeney 45'	Stadium: Vicarage Road; Attendance: 8,950; Referee: Booth

9 January 2011	Chelsea (1)	7–0	Ipswich Town (2)	Fulham, London
15:00 GMT	Kalou 33'; Sturridge 33', 52'; Edwards 41' (o.g.); Anelka 49'; Lampard 78', 79'	Report		Stadium: Stamford Bridge; Attendance: 41,654; Referee: D'Urso

8 January 2011	Sunderland (1)	1–2	Notts County (3)	Sunderland
15:00 GMT	Bent 81' (pen.)	Report	Westcarr 5'; Hughes 75'	Stadium: Stadium of Light; Attendance: 17,582; Referee: Attwell

8 January 2011	Scunthorpe United (2)	1–5	Everton (1)	Scunthorpe
15:00 GMT	Collins 46'	Report	Saha 4'; Beckford 33'; Coleman 58'; Fellaini 73'; Baines 83'	Stadium: Glanford Park; Attendance: 7,028; Referee: Friend

9 January 2011	Manchester United (1)	1–0	Liverpool (1)	Stretford
13:30 GMT	Giggs 2' (pen.)	Report	Gerrard (red card) 32'	Stadium: Old Trafford; Attendance: 74,727; Referee: Webb

8 January 2011	Hull City (2)	2–3	Wigan Athletic (1)	Kingston upon Hull
15:00 GMT	Barmby 74', 89'	Report	Diamé 21', 77'; McManaman 56'	Stadium: KC Stadium; Attendance: 10,433; Referee: Clattenburg

8 January 2011	Stoke City (1)	1–1	Cardiff City (2)	Stoke-on-Trent
15:00 GMT	Tuncay 45'	Report	Chopra 8'	Stadium: Britannia Stadium; Attendance: 18,629; Referee: Halsey

18 January 2011 Replay	Cardiff City (2)	0–2 (a.e.t.)	Stoke City (1)	Cardiff
19:45 GMT		Report	Walters 92', 115'	Stadium: Cardiff City Stadium; Attendance: 13,671; Referee: Walton

9 January 2011	Tottenham Hotspur (1)	3–0	Charlton Athletic (3)	Tottenham, London
13:30 GMT	Townsend 49'; Defoe 58', 60'	Report		Stadium: White Hart Lane; Attendance: 35,698; Referee: Oliver

8 January 2011	Preston North End (2)	1–2	Nottingham Forest (2)	Preston
15:00 GMT	Carter 35'	Report	Anderson 50'; Chambers 89'	Stadium: Deepdale; Attendance: 9,636; Referee: Crossley

8 January 2011	Norwich City (2)	0–1	Leyton Orient (3)	Norwich
15:00 GMT		Report	Smith 20'	Stadium: Carrow Road; Attendance: 18,087; Referee: Whitestone

8 January 2011	Torquay United (4)	1–0	Carlisle United (3)	Torquay
15:00 GMT	O'Kane 6'	Report		Stadium: Plainmoor; Attendance: 3,005; Referee: Phil Gibbs

10 January 2011	Crawley Town (5)	2–1	Derby County (2)	Crawley
20:00 GMT	McAllister 30'; Torres 90+1'	Report	Addison 63'	Stadium: Broadfield Stadium; Attendance: 4,145; Referee: Haywood

11 January 2011	Wycombe Wanderers (4)	0–1	Hereford United (4)	High Wycombe
19:45 GMT		Report	Manset 32'	Stadium: Adams Park; Attendance: 2,353; Referee: Danny McDermid

== Fourth Round Proper ==
The draw was held on Sunday 9 January 2011. The lowest ranked team left in the competition was Crawley Town of the Conference National, the fifth tier of English football. Of the other 31 teams, 15 were from the Premier League, 6 were from The Championship, 6 were from League One, and 4 were from League Two. Three matches went to a replay, Everton v Chelsea, Bolton Wanderers v Wigan Athletic and Manchester City v Notts County.

29 January 2011	Torquay United (4)	0–1	Crawley Town (5)	Torquay
15:00 GMT		Report	Tubbs 39'	Stadium: Plainmoor; Attendance: 5,065; Referee: Darren Deadman

29 January 2011	Watford (2)	0–1	Brighton & Hove Albion (3)	Watford
15:00 GMT		Report	Barnes 16'	Stadium: Vicarage Road; Attendance: 14,519; Referee: Eddie Ilderton

29 January 2011	Bolton Wanderers (1)	0–0	Wigan Athletic (1)	Horwich
15:00 GMT		Report		Stadium: Reebok Stadium; Attendance: 14,950; Referee: Andre Marriner

16 February 2011 Replay	Wigan Athletic (1)	0–1	Bolton Wanderers (1)	Wigan
19:45 GMT		(Report)	Klasnić 66'	Stadium: DW Stadium; Attendance: 7,515; Referee: Michael Oliver

30 January 2011	Arsenal (1)	2–1	Huddersfield Town (3)	Holloway, London
12:00 GMT	P. Clarke 22' (o.g.); Squillaci (red card) 42'; Fàbregas 86' (pen.)	Report	A. Lee 66'	Stadium: Emirates Stadium; Attendance: 59,375; Referee: Mark Clattenburg

30 January 2011	Fulham (1)	4–0	Tottenham Hotspur (1)	Fulham, London
16:30 GMT	Murphy 11' (pen.), 14' (pen.); Hangeland 23'; Dembélé 45+3'	Report	Dawson (red card) 13'	Stadium: Craven Cottage; Attendance: 21,829; Referee: Phil Dowd

29 January 2011	Everton (1)	1–1	Chelsea (1)	Liverpool
12:30 GMT	Saha 62'	Report	Kalou 75'	Stadium: Goodison Park; Attendance: 28,376; Referee: Howard Webb

19 February 2011 Replay	Chelsea (1)	1–1 (a.e.t.) (3–4 p)	Everton (1)	Fulham, London
12:30 GMT	Lampard 104'	Report	Baines 119'	Stadium: Stamford Bridge; Attendance: 41,113; Referee: Phil Dowd
	Penalties
	Lampard (penalty scored); Drogba (penalty scored); Anelka (penalty missed); Essien (penalty scored); Cole (penalty missed)		(penalty missed) Baines; (penalty scored) Jagielka; (penalty scored) Arteta; (penalty scored) Heitinga; (penalty scored) Neville

29 January 2011	Southampton (3)	1–2	Manchester United (1)	Southampton
17:15 GMT	Chaplow 45'	Report	Owen 65'; Hernández 75'	Stadium: St Mary's Stadium; Attendance: 28,792; Referee: Martin Atkinson

29 January 2011	Swansea City (2)	1–2	Leyton Orient (3)	Swansea
12:50 GMT	Van der Gun 45'	Report	Smith 35'; Tate 88' (o.g.)	Stadium: Liberty Stadium; Attendance: 6,281; Referee: Stuart Attwell

29 January 2011	Burnley (2)	3–1	Burton Albion (4)	Burnley
15:00 GMT	Eagles 29', 70'; Paterson 94'	Report	Calvin Zola 80'	Stadium: Turf Moor; Attendance: 11,664; Referee: Jon Moss

29 January 2011	Birmingham City (1)	3–2	Coventry City (2)	Birmingham
15:00 GMT	Bentley 35'; Parnaby 67'; Phillips 73'	Report	King 11'; Wood 26'	Stadium: St Andrew's; Attendance: 16,669; Referee: Mike Dean

29 January 2011	Stevenage (4)	1–2	Reading (2)	Stevenage
15:00 GMT	Charles 72'	Report	Leigertwood 23'; Long 87'	Stadium: Broadhall Way; Attendance: 6,614; Referee: Anthony Taylor

29 January 2011	Aston Villa (1)	3–1	Blackburn Rovers (1)	Birmingham
13:00 GMT	Clark 11'; Pires 35'; Delfouneso 42'	Report	Kalinić 18'	Stadium: Villa Park; Attendance: 26,067; Referee: Lee Probert

29 January 2011	Sheffield Wednesday (3)	4–1	Hereford United (4)	Sheffield
15:00 GMT	Potter 15'; Morrison 69', 79'; Johnson 77'		Fleetwood 9'	Stadium: Hillsborough; Attendance: 16,578; Referee: Steve Tanner

30 January 2011	West Ham United (1)	3–2	Nottingham Forest (2)	Upton Park, London
14:00 GMT	Obinna 4', 42', 52' (pen.)	Report	Adebola 18'; McGoldrick 40'	Stadium: Boleyn Ground; Attendance: 29,287; Referee: Michael Oliver

30 January 2011	Wolverhampton Wanderers (1)	0–1	Stoke City (1)	Wolverhampton
13:00 GMT		Report	Huth 81'	Stadium: Molineux Stadium; Attendance: 11,967; Referee: Mike Jones

30 January 2011	Notts County (3)	1–1	Manchester City (1)	Nottingham
14:00 GMT	Bishop 59'	Report	Džeko 80'	Stadium: Meadow Lane; Attendance: 16,587; Referee: Chris Foy

20 February 2011 Replay	Manchester City (1)	5–0	Notts County (3)	Manchester
14:00 GMT	Vieira 37', 58'; Tevez 84'; Džeko 89'; Richards 90'	Report		Stadium: City of Manchester Stadium; Attendance: 27,276; Referee: Mike Jones

== Fifth Round Proper ==
The draw was held on Sunday 30 January 2011. For the second consecutive round, the lowest ranked team left in the competition was Crawley Town of the Conference National, the fifth tier of English football. They were the first non-League side to make the fifth round since 1994. Of the other 15 teams, 10 were from the Premier League, two from the Championship and three from League One. One match went to a replay, Leyton Orient v Arsenal.

21 February 2011	West Ham United (1)	5–1	Burnley (2)	Upton Park, London
20:00 GMT	Hitzlsperger 23'; Cole 48', 50'; Reid 59'; Sears 90'	Report	Rodriguez 71'	Attendance: 24,488; Referee: Martin Atkinson

2 March 2011	Manchester City (1)	3–0	Aston Villa (1)	City of Manchester Stadium, Manchester
19:45 GMT	Y. Touré 5'; Balotelli 25'; Silva 70'	Report		Attendance: 25,570; Referee: Mark Clattenburg

19 February 2011	Stoke City (1)	3–0	Brighton & Hove Albion (3)	Britannia Stadium, Stoke-on-Trent
15:00 GMT	Carew 14'; Walters 22'; Shawcross 43'	Report		Attendance: 21,312; Referee: Howard Webb

19 February 2011	Birmingham City (1)	3–0	Sheffield Wednesday (3)	St Andrew's, Birmingham
15:00 GMT	Beausejour 6'; Martins 17'; Murphy 53'	Report		Attendance: 14,607; Referee: Anthony Taylor

20 February 2011	Leyton Orient (3)	1–1	Arsenal (1)	Brisbane Road, London
16:30 GMT	Téhoué 89'	Report	Rosický 53'	Attendance: 9,136; Referee: Kevin Friend

2 March 2011 Replay	Arsenal (1)	5–0	Leyton Orient (3)	Emirates Stadium, London
19:45 GMT	Chamakh 7'; Bendtner 30', 43', 62' (pen.); Clichy 75'	Report		Attendance: 59,361; Referee: Lee Mason

1 March 2011	Everton (1)	0–1	Reading (2)	Goodison Park, Liverpool
19:30 GMT		Report	Mills 26'	Attendance: 29,976; Referee: Andre Marriner

19 February 2011	Manchester United (1)	1–0	Crawley Town (5)	Old Trafford, Manchester
17:15 GMT	Brown 28'	Report		Attendance: 74,778; Referee: Lee Probert

20 February 2011	Fulham (1)	0–1	Bolton Wanderers (1)	Craven Cottage, London
15:00 GMT		Report	Klasnić 19'	Attendance: 19,571; Referee: Stuart Attwell

== Sixth Round Proper ==
The draw was held on Sunday 20 February 2011. Reading of The Championship defeated Everton in the fifth round, and are the last non-Premier League team remaining in the competition, for the second year running. All seven other teams are from the Premier League.

12 March 2011	Birmingham City (1)	2–3	Bolton Wanderers (1)	St Andrew's, Birmingham
12:45 GMT	Jerome 38'; Phillips 80'	Report	Elmander 21'; K. Davies 66' (pen.); Lee 90'	Attendance: 23,699; Referee: Phil Dowd

12 March 2011	Manchester United (1)	2–0	Arsenal (1)	Old Trafford, Manchester
17:15 GMT	Fabio 28'; Rooney 49'	Report		Attendance: 74,693; Referee: Chris Foy

13 March 2011	Stoke City (1)	2–1	West Ham United (1)	Britannia Stadium, Stoke-on-Trent
14:00 GMT	Huth 12'; Higginbotham 63'	Report	Piquionne 30'	Attendance: 24,550; Referee: Mike Jones

13 March 2011	Manchester City (1)	1–0	Reading (2)	City of Manchester Stadium, Manchester
16:45 GMT	Richards 74'	Report		Attendance: 41,150; Referee: Lee Probert

== Semi-finals ==
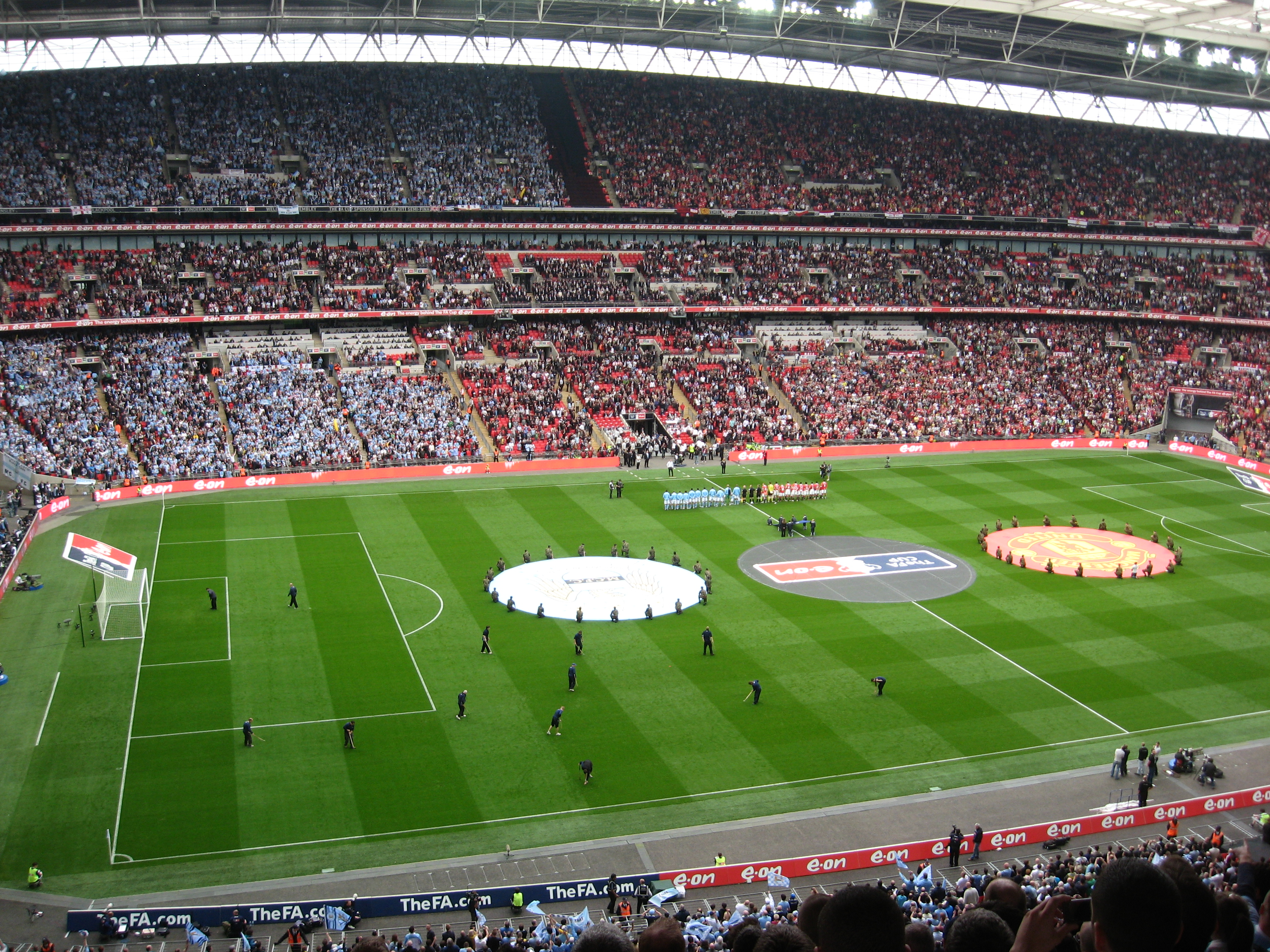
Before kick off of the Manchester derby FA Cup Semi-final at Wembley Stadium

The draw was conducted by Hope Powell and Fabio Capello at Wembley Stadium on Sunday, 13 March 2011, after the result of the Stoke game, but before the end of the Manchester City game. Ties were played on 16/17 April at Wembley. With Manchester City's victory over Reading, it meant that the Semi-finals of the Cup would be an all-Premier League affair, and in addition, Wembley Stadium would host its first ever Manchester derby game.

16 April 2011	Manchester City (1)	1–0	Manchester United (1)	Wembley Stadium, London
17:15 BST	Y. Touré 52'	Report	Scholes (red card) 72'	Attendance: 86,549; Referee: Mike Dean

17 April 2011	Bolton Wanderers (1)	0–5	Stoke City (1)	Wembley Stadium, London
16:00 BST		Report	Etherington 11'; Huth 17'; Jones 30'; Walters 68', 81'	Attendance: 75,064; Referee: Howard Webb

== Final ==
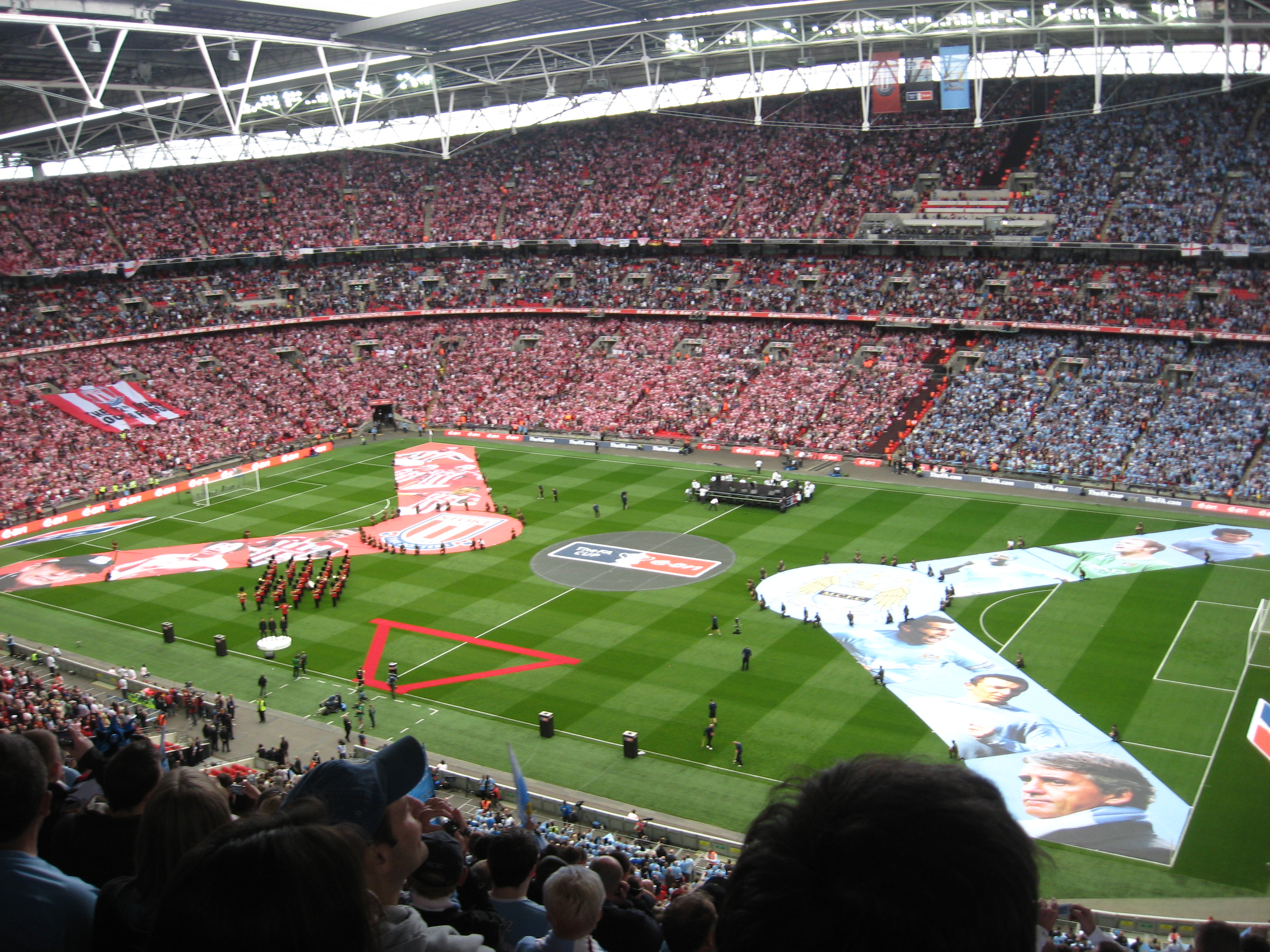
Before kick off at the 2010-11 FA Cup Final as Manchester City take on Stoke City at Wembley Stadium

14 May 2011
15:00 BST

Manchester City	1–0	Stoke City
Y. Touré 74'	Report

Wembley Stadium, London
Attendance: 88,643
Referee: Martin Atkinson (West Yorkshire)

== Top scorer ==
As of 17 April 2011

Rank	Player	Club	Goals
1	(France) Mathieu Manset	Hereford United	6
1	(England) Scott McGleish	Leyton Orient	6
3	(England) Gary Madine	Carlisle United	5
3	(Republic of Ireland) Clinton Morrison	Sheffield Wednesday	5
3	(Republic of Ireland) Jonathan Walters	Stoke City	5
6	(Wales) Stuart Fleetwood	Hereford United	4
6	(England) Antony Sweeney	Hartlepool United	4
6	(France) Jonathan Téhoué	Leyton Orient	4

== Media coverage ==
In the United Kingdom, ITV were the free to air broadcasters for the third consecutive season while ESPN took over the subscription broadcaster package Setanta Sports held, while S4C broadcast it in Wales.

Round	Date	Teams	Kick-off	Channels	
Round	Date	Teams	Kick-off	Digital	TV
Third Round (Replay)	18 January	Manchester City v Leicester City	7:45pm	—N/a	ESPN
Third Round (Replay)	18 January	Cardiff City v Stoke City	7:45pm	—N/a	S4C
Fourth Round	29 January	Everton v Chelsea	12:30pm	—N/a	ESPN
Fourth Round	29 January	Southampton v Manchester United	5:15pm	ITV Hub	ITV1
Fourth Round	30 January	Arsenal v Huddersfield Town	12:00pm	—N/a	ESPN
Fourth Round	30 January	Notts County v Manchester City	2:00pm	ITV Hub	ITV1
Fourth Round	30 January	Fulham v Tottenham Hotspur	12:30pm	—N/a	ESPN
Fourth Round (Replay)	19 February	Chelsea v Everton	12:30pm	—N/a	ESPN
Fourth Round (Replay)	20 February	Manchester City v Notts County	2:00pm	ITV Hub	ITV1
Fifth Round	19 February	Manchester United v Crawley Town	5:15pm	ITV Hub	ITV1
Fifth Round	20 February	Leyton Orient v Arsenal	4:30pm	—N/a	ESPN
Fifth Round	21 February	West Ham United v Burnley	8:00pm	—N/a	ESPN
Fifth Round	1 March	Everton v Reading	7:30pm	—N/a	ESPN
Fifth Round	2 March	Manchester City v Aston Villa	7:45pm	ITV Hub	ITV1
Fifth Round (Replay)	2 March	Arsenal v Leyton Orient	7:45pm	—N/a	ESPN
Sixth Round	12 March	Birmingham City v Bolton Wanderers	12:45pm	—N/a	ESPN
Sixth Round	12 March	Manchester United v Arsenal	5:15pm	ITV Hub	ITV1
Sixth Round	13 March	Stoke City v West Ham United	2:00pm	ITV Hub	ITV1
Sixth Round	13 March	Manchester City v Reading	4:45pm	—N/a	ESPN
Semi-Finals	16 April	Manchester City v Manchester United	5:15pm	ITV Hub	ITV1
Semi-Finals	17 April	Bolton Wanderers v Stoke City	4:00pm	—N/a	ESPN
Final	14 May	Manchester City v Stoke City	3:00pm	ITV Hub	ITV1
Final	14 May	Manchester City v Stoke City	3:00pm	—N/a	ESPN

The matches shown live on ITV were:

• Southport 2-5 Sheffield Wednesday (R1)

• AFC Wimbledon 0-2 Stevenage (R2)

• Arsenal 1-1 Leeds United (R3)

• Manchester United 1-0 Liverpool (R3)

• Leeds United 1-3 Arsenal (R3 Replay)

The matches shown live on ESPN were:

• Rochdale 2-3 FC United of Manchester (R1)

• Cambridge United 0-0 Huddersfield Town (R1)

• Woking 2-2 Brighton & Hove Albion (R1 Replay)

• Ebbsfleet United 2-3 AFC Wimbledon (R1 Replay)

• Crawley Town 1-1 Swindon Town (R2)

• Droylsden 1-1 Leyton Orient (R2)

• FC United of Manchester 0-4 Brighton & Hove Albion (R2 Replay)

• Luton Town 1-3 Charlton Athletic (R2 Replay)

• Stevenage 3-1 Newcastle United (R3)

• Leicester City 2-2 Manchester City (R3)

• Crawley Town 2-1 Derby County (R3)

International broadcasters

Country	Broadcaster
Albania	Tring Sport
Belgium	Prime
Canada	Setanta Sports
France	France Télévisions
Italy	SKY Italia
Netherlands	Eredivisie Live
