= Sam Ashton =

English footballer

Personal information
- Full name: Samuel Seth Ashton
- Date of birth: 9 October 1986 (age 40)
- Place of birth: Bolton, England
- Position: Goalkeeper

Team information
- Current team: Bootle

Youth career
- 2001–2005: Bolton Wanderers

Senior career*
Years	Team	Apps	(Gls)
2005–2006	Bolton Wanderers	0	(0)
2006–2011	FC United of Manchester	231	(1)
2011–2013	Skelmersdale United	34	(1)
2012–2013	→ Southport (dual registration)	0	(0)
2013–2017	Chorley	97	(0)
2017–2018	Kendal Town	2	(0)
2018–2019	Ramsbottom United		
2019–2021	Lancaster City	40	(0)
2021	Radcliffe	2	(0)
2021–2022	Macclesfield	27	(0)
2022	Bootle	0	(0)
2022–2023	Skelmersdale United	0	(0)
2023–	Bootle	0	(0)
- * Club domestic league appearances and goals as of 11:59, 13 May 2022

Samuel Seth Ashton (born 9 October 1986) is an English footballer who plays as a goalkeeper for English non-League side Skelmersdale United. He has previously played for Bolton Wanderers, FC United of Manchester, Bootle, Southport, Chorley, Ramsbottom United, Radcliffe, and Macclesfield.

== Career ==
=== Bolton Wanderers ===
Ashton began his professional football career at Bolton Wanderers and, on 7 January 2006, was named as the substitute goalkeeper for Bolton's FA Cup Third Round tie against Watford. However, he came on for the last few minutes of the match as a striker, replacing Jared Borgetti. Ashton also made 18 appearances for the Bolton Wanderers Reserves during his time at the Reebok.

Described by his boss as "the best and most staunch Bolton Wanderers fan in our camp", then Bolton manager Sam Allardyce explained: "He wears a massive tattoo with the club badge on it. He comes from the heart of Bolton and he loves the club so much and is so passionate. He just asked if he could get on for a couple of minutes. We were always ready to play him outfield as he has played at right-back and centre-back for the youth team. I thought it would be a perfect late Christmas present."

Towards the end of the 2005–06 season he was told that he was free to leave Bolton and spent considerable time on trial with non-League sides such as Cambridge United and Radcliffe Borough.

=== F.C. United of Manchester ===
On 26 July 2006, he made his debut for FC United of Manchester in a friendly against Bury. He has since made his competitive debut for United of Manchester against St Helens Town, in the first game of the 2006–07 North West Counties Football League Division One season, keeping a clean sheet in a 2–0 victory for the away team, played at Knowsley Road. After 140 appearances for the club, he reached a landmark 50th clean sheet on 4 April 2009 against North Ferriby United. Against Brighton & Hove Albion in the FA Cup second round he saved a penalty in the last minute to earn United of Manchester a replay.

He scored his first career goal in a 4–0 win away to Retford United on 15 January 2011. The ball got caught up in the wind and lobbed the opposing goalkeeper.

He left the club in July 2011 in order to secure more first team football.

=== Skelmersdale United ===
Ashton joined Skelmersdale United after leaving F.C. United. In March 2012 he also joined Southport on dual registration forms.

=== Chorley ===
In May 2013 Ashton joined Northern Premier League Premier Division side Chorley. He was a part of the Chorley team that won the Northern Premier League and gained promotion to the Conference North in 2014. In October 2016 Ashton was ruled out for the season for Chorley with a crucial ligament injury.

=== Ramsbottom United ===
In January 2018 he signed for Ramsbottom United after playing two games for Kendal Town over the Christmas period.

=== Lancaster City ===
In June 2019 he signed for Lancaster City.

=== Radcliffe ===
He signed for Northern Premier League Premier Division side Radcliffe on a free transfer in August 2021.

=== Macclesfield ===
In late 2021 Ashton signed for Macclesfield F.C. in the Northwest Counties Premier Division. Macclesfield went on to win the league in their first season and gained promotion to the Northern Premier League Division One West.

== Career statistics ==
As of match played 24 October 2016

Appearances and goals by club, season and competition
Club	Season	League			FA Cup		League Cup		Other		Total	
Club	Season	Division	Apps	Goals	Apps	Goals	Apps	Goals	Apps	Goals	Apps	Goals
Bolton Wanderers	2006-07	Premier League	0	0	1	0	0	0	0	0	1	0
Bolton Wanderers	Total		0	0	1	0	0	0	0	0	1	0
F.C. United of Manchester	2010-11	Northern Premier League Premier Division	0	0	4	0	0	0	0	0	4	0
F.C. United of Manchester	Total		0	0	4	0	0	0	0	0	4	0
Chorley	2014-15	National League North	39	0	0	0	0	0	0	0	39	0
Chorley	2015-16	National League North	42	0	2	0	0	0	0	0	44	0
Chorley	2016-17	National League North	16	0	0	0	0	0	0	0	16	0
Chorley	Total		97	0	2	0	0	0	0	0	99	0
Career total			97	0	7	0	0	0	0	0	104	0

== Honours ==
- Individual
  - 2010–11 FA Cup Player of the Round (1): Second Round Proper
