= Ryan Jackson (English footballer) =

English footballer (born 1990)

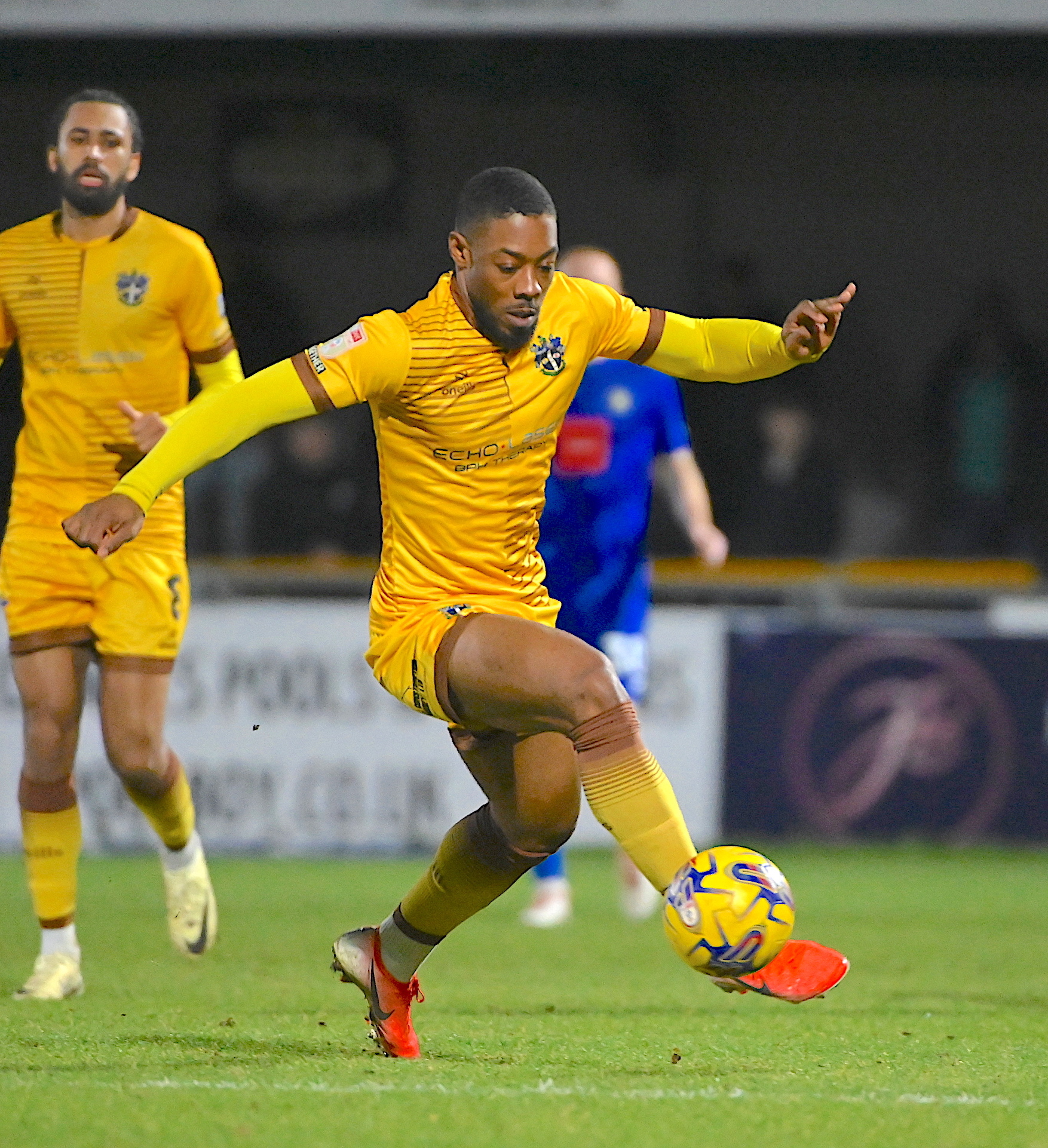
- Jackson playing for Sutton United in January 2024

Personal information
- Full name: Ryan Oliver Jackson
- Date of birth: 31 July 1990 (age 36)
- Place of birth: Streatham, London, England
- Height: 1.75 m (5 ft 9 in)
- Position: Right-back

Team information
- Current team: Farnborough
- Number: 22

Youth career
- 2008–2010: AFC Wimbledon

Senior career*
Years	Team	Apps	(Gls)
2010–2012	AFC Wimbledon	47	(2)
2011	→ Fleetwood Town (loan)	4	(2)
2012	→ Cambridge United (loan)	5	(0)
2012–2013	Macclesfield Town	36	(1)
2013–2015	Newport County	63	(0)
2015–2017	Gillingham	71	(3)
2017–2020	Colchester United	122	(6)
2020–2022	Gillingham	77	(2)
2022–2023	Cheltenham Town	38	(0)
2023–2025	Sutton United	61	(2)
2025–2026	AFC Totton	17	(0)
2026–	Farnborough	9	(0)

International career
2013	England C	2	(0)
- * Club domestic league appearances and goals as of 21:57, 22 October 2026 (UTC)

Ryan Oliver Jackson (born 31 July 1990) is an English professional footballer who plays as a right-back for National League South club Farnborough.

Jackson joined the AFC Wimbledon reserve team in 2008 and broke into the first-team in the second half of the 2009–10 season. He made his Football League debut in 2011 following AFC Wimbledon's promotion to League Two, before loan spells at Fleetwood Town and Cambridge United. Following his release by Wimbledon in 2012, he signed for Conference Premier side Macclesfield Town. He joined League Two side Newport County one year later, where he made 63 league appearances before joining League One club Gillingham. He was released after two seasons and 71 league appearances, joining Colchester United in League Two. He signed again for Gillingham in July 2020 after being released by the Essex side.

Jackson has represented England C, making two appearances in 2013.

== Club career ==
Born in Streatham, London, Jackson joined the reserve team at AFC Wimbledon in 2008 and graduated to the first-team in the latter stages of the 2009–10 season. On 3 April 2010, he made his first-team debut for the Dons in a Conference Premier match against Histon in a 3–1 win, coming on as a substitute. In April 2010, he signed a full-time contract after a man of the match display against Tamworth in his first start for the club. He became a first-team regular in the 2010–11 season, with 42 appearances in all competitions and goals against Mansfield Town and Hayes & Yeading United, but did not feature in the 2011 Conference Premier play-off final win over Luton Town, which saw the Dons gain a place in the Football League.

On 10 September 2011, Jackson made his Football League debut in a 1–1 draw with Aldershot Town, coming on as a substitute. He joined Conference Premier side Fleetwood Town on loan on 14 October 2011. He scored twice on his debut the same day in a 3–1 away win against Lincoln City. After four league games with Fleetwood, on 31 January 2012 he joined Cambridge United on loan until the end of the season. He was told that he could leave the club in January, and he was released by Wimbledon at the end of the season when his contract expired.

On 7 June 2012, Jackson signed a one-year contract at Macclesfield Town, dropping down one tier to return to the Conference Premier. He made his debut on 10 August 2012, earning his side a penalty during a 2–1 away defeat to Hereford United. He scored once for Macclesfield in a 2–0 home win against Tamworth on 6 November 2012.

After training with Newport County for two weeks during the summer of 2013, Jackson signed for the League Two club on 1 August 2013 following confusion as to whether he was a free agent or not. To settle the issue, Newport agreed to pay Macclesfield a "small compensation fee". On 6 August 2013, he made his debut in a 3–1 extra time win over Brighton & Hove Albion in the League Cup.

In May 2015, Jackson turned down a new contract offer at Newport and signed for League One side Gillingham on a two-year contract, joining up with former Newport manager Justin Edinburgh. On 8 August 2015, he made his debut in a 4–0 home win against Sheffield United. He scored his first Gillingham goal on 28 November 2015 in a 2–2 away draw with Shrewsbury Town.

After making more than 70 appearances for Gillingham during two seasons, he was released at the end of his two-year contract in 2017.

On 30 June 2017, Jackson agreed to return to League Two to join Colchester United on a two-year contract. He made his Colchester debut on 5 August in their 3–1 defeat at Accrington Stanley. He scored his first goal for the club on 9 September in Colchester's 3–1 win against Crawley Town.

He signed a new two-year contract with the club on 15 May 2018. On 28 April 2020 Colchester confirmed that Jackson would be released at the end his contract in June 2020.

On 31 July 2020 it was announced that Jackson had signed again for Gillingham. Following relegation to League Two, Jackson was released at the end of the 2021–22 season.

In July 2022, Jackson signed for Cheltenham Town.

On 23 June 2023, Jackson agreed to join League Two club Sutton United upon the expiration of his Cheltenham Town contract.

In August 2025, Jackson joined AFC Totton ahead of their first ever season in National League South.

On 12 June 2026, Jackson agreed to join fellow National League South side, Farnborough.

== International career ==
In January 2013, Jackson was named in Paul Fairclough's England C team to face Turkey A2 in the International Challenge Trophy. He played in the 1–0 semi-final defeat on 11 February 2013. He made one further appearance for the C team, playing in a 6–1 defeat of Bermuda in June 2013.

== Style of play ==
Jackson is a "pacy right-back" who possesses a long throw-in.

== Career statistics ==
As of match played 27 April 2024

Appearances and goals by club, season and competition
Club	Season	League			FA Cup		League Cup		Other		Total	
Club	Season	Division	Apps	Goals	Apps	Goals	Apps	Goals	Apps	Goals	Apps	Goals
AFC Wimbledon	2009–10	Conference Premier	3	0	0	0	–		0	0	3	0
AFC Wimbledon	2010–11	Conference Premier	37	2	3	0	–		1 (Note: Appearances in FA Trophy)	0	41	2
AFC Wimbledon	2011–12	League Two	7	0	2	0	0	0	1 (Note: Appearances in Football League Trophy)	0	10	0
AFC Wimbledon	Total		47	2	5	0	0	0	2	0	54	2
Fleetwood Town (loan)	2011–12	Conference Premier	4	2	–		–		–		4	2
Cambridge United (loan)	2011–12	Conference Premier	5	0	–		–		2	0	7	0
Macclesfield Town	2012–13	Conference Premier	36	1	5	0	–		0	0	41	1
Newport County	2013–14	League Two	29	0	3	0	2	0	2	0	36	0
Newport County	2014–15	League Two	34	0	1	0	1	0	1	0	37	0
Newport County	Total		63	0	4	0	3	0	3	0	73	0
Gillingham	2015–16	League One	37	2	1	0	2	0	1	0	41	2
Gillingham	2016–17	League One	34	1	1	0	2	0	2 (Note: Appearance(s) in EFL Trophy)	0	39	1
Gillingham	Total		71	3	2	0	4	0	3	0	80	3
Colchester United	2017–18	League Two	42	2	1	0	1	0	1	0	45	2
Colchester United	2018–19	League Two	46	2	1	0	1	0	2	0	50	2
Colchester United	2019–20	League Two	34	2	1	0	5	0	5 (Note: Three appearances in EFL Trophy, two appearances in EFL League Two play-offs)	0	45	2
Colchester United	Total		122	6	3	0	7	0	8	0	140	6
Gillingham	2020–21	League One	43	0	2	0	3	0	3	0	51	0
Gillingham	2021–22	League One	34	2	2	0	0	0	1	0	37	2
Gillingham	Total		77	2	4	0	3	0	4	0	88	2
Cheltenham Town	2022–23	League One	38	0	1	1	0	0	4	0	43	1
Sutton United	2023–24	League Two	37	2	3	0	2	0	3	0	45	2
Career total			500	18	27	1	19	0	29	0	575	19
