= Nathaniel Kerr =

English footballer (born 1987)

Nat Kerr
Personal information
- Full name: Nathaniel James Kerr
- Date of birth: 31 October 1987 (age 39)
- Place of birth: Manchester, England
- Position: Right back

Youth career
- Crewe Alexandra

Senior career*
| Years | Team | Apps | (Gls) |
| 2006–2008 | Rotherham United | 3 | (0) |
| 2007–2008 | → Northwich Victoria (loan) | 13 | (0) |
| 2008–2009 | Barrow | 18 | (0) |
| 2009–2010 | Northwich Victoria | 29 | (1) |
| 2010–2015 | Droylsden | 72 | (7) |
- * Club domestic league appearances and goals

Nathaniel "Nat" Kerr (born 31 October 1987) is an English former professional footballer whose preferred position was at right back. He last played at amateur level in Stockport in 2015.

== Career ==
Kerr started his career at Crewe Alexandra youth academy but was picked up by Rotherham United after being released. He made his debut on 21 April 2007 in the 1–0 defeat at Yeovil Town coming on as a late sub for David Worrell. Rotherham had already been relegated at this point of the season and manager Mark Robins played Kerr in all the remaining games. The following season Kerr didn't play at all for the Millers but was loaned out in November 2007 to Northwich Victoria. RAt the end of the season he was released.

On 13 October 2008, Kerr joined Conference National team Barrow on non contract terms after impressing joint management duo Dave Bayliss and Darren Sheridan playing for the Bluebirds' reserve side. He made his debut on 18 October in the home win over Eastbourne Borough. He did not gain a regular place in the team, however, and was released by the club in May 2009.

== Assault conviction ==
On 30 August 2014, while playing for the Longsight pub team AFC Gold Cup, Kerr was sent off for deliberately stamping on the leg of Stuart Parsons. Kerr's actions resulted in Parsons' ankle requiring a pin and plate due to it being broken in two places. Kerr was found guilty of assault, and received a sentence of one year's imprisonment, as a result of the intentional "long jump" tackle.
