= Ciaran Kilheeney =

English footballer

Personal information
- Full name: Ciaran Kilheeney
- Date of birth: 9 January 1984 (age 42)
- Place of birth: Stockport, England
- Position: Striker

Youth career
- 2001–2002: Manchester City

Senior career*
Years	Team	Apps	(Gls)
2002–2003	Mossley	12	(9)
2003	Exeter City	4	(0)
2003–2004	Droylsden	38	(8)
2004–2005	Radcliffe Borough	35	(15)
2005–2007	Ashton United	40	(26)
2007–2008	Burscough	70	(37)
2008–2010	Southport	60	(33)
2010–2012	Droylsden	15	(8)
2012–	Chorley		
2012–2014	Warrington Town		
2014–2015	Droylsden		
2015–2017	Warrington Town		
2017–	Droylsden		
- * Club domestic league appearances and goals as of 15:00, 6 November 2009 (UTC)

Ciaran Kilheeney (born 9 January 1984) is an English footballer, who last played for Droylsden.

== Career ==
After stints at Exeter City in the Football League and Mossley, the former Manchester City trainee joined Burscough from Ashton United. He scored 20 goals to help the Linnets to promotion in 2007, before finishing joint top marksman in the Conference North the following season.

In July 2010, Kilheeney signed for Conference North side Droylsden. He left in March 2012 and signed for Chorley, scoring 2 goals on his debut at Worksop Town.

Between 2012 and 2018, Kilheeney had multiple spells at both Warrington Town and Droylsden.
