= Steven Gregory =

English footballer (born 1987)

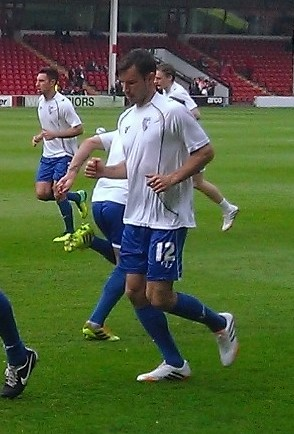
- Gregory warming up before a game in 2014

Personal information
- Full name: Steven Michael Gregory
- Date of birth: 19 March 1987 (age 39)
- Place of birth: Haddenham, England
- Position: Midfielder

Youth career
- 2002–2005: Wycombe Wanderers

Senior career*
Years	Team	Apps	(Gls)
2005–2008	Wycombe Wanderers	4	(0)
2007–2008	→ Hayes & Yeading United (loan)	11	(1)
2008	→ Havant & Waterlooville (loan)	3	(0)
2008–2009	Hayes & Yeading United	36	(2)
2009–2011	AFC Wimbledon	78	(1)
2011–2012	AFC Bournemouth	28	(3)
2012	→ AFC Wimbledon (loan)	15	(0)
2013–2014	Gillingham	55	(0)
2016	Thame United	3	(1)
Total		233	(8)

International career
2010–2011	England C	2	(0)
- * Club domestic league appearances and goals

Steven Michael Gregory (born 19 March 1987) is an English former footballer who played as a midfielder.

== Club career ==
=== Wycombe Wanderers ===
Gregory began his career as a 15-year-old in the youth ranks of Wycombe Wanderers, his highlight being captaining the side in the Berks & Bucks Senior Cup final win over Milton Keynes Dons. Gregory made his Football League debut for the Chairboys on 6 May 2006, coming on for Matt Bloomfield in the second half in a 2–0 victory against Peterborough United. During his time with Wycombe he was sent out on loan to Havant and Waterlooville and Hayes & Yeading United.

=== Hayes and Yeading United ===
At the end of the 2007–08 season, his contract at Wycombe was not extended and Gregory signed for Hayes & Yeading United, for whom he went on to score two crucial goals in the play-off final against Hampton and Richmond Borough on 7 May 2009 as they won promotion to the Conference National.

=== First spell at AFC Wimbledon ===
In summer 2009, Gregory signed for AFC Wimbledon. On 9 November 2009, he made his first FA Cup appearance in the club's 4–1 loss to Millwall. Gregory featured as a regular for the first team during their Football League promotion winning season, and was a member of the starting eleven that beat Luton Town in the Conference National Play-off Final, winning the Dons promotion to League Two.

=== AFC Bournemouth and loan spell ===
On 30 June 2011, League One club AFC Bournemouth signed the player for an undisclosed fee. He made twenty three league starts for the Cherries during 2011–12, but found his opportunities limited at the start of the 2012–13 campaign, finding himself significantly down the pecking order at the club. For this reason it was decided that Gregory should be sent out on loan, and he opted for his former club AFC Wimbledon as soon as he received the request from the Dons first team coach Simon Bassey. In December 2012, following his return from a loan with AFC Wimbledon, his contract with Bournemouth was cancelled by mutual consent.

=== Gillingham ===
Shortly after the conclusion of the loan, he signed for Gillingham. He was released by the club at the end of the 2013–14 season. In total, Gregory made 55 league appearances for the "Gills".

=== Thame United ===
On 10 July 2016, it was announced that Gregory had signed for Hellenic Football League Premier Division side Thame United. He made his debut on 2 August against Burnham, scoring his first goal for the club. Gregory was promoted with United in his first season for the club.

== International career ==
Gregory appeared twice for England C, playing in matches against Wales in 2010 and Belgium in 2011.

== Honours ==
AFC Wimbledon

- Conference National play-offs: 2011

Gillingham

- Football League Two: 2012–13

Thame United

- Hellenic League Premier Division: 2016–17
