= Ashley Carew =

British footballer

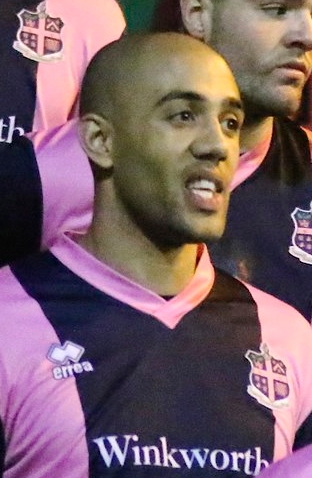
- Carew lining up for Dulwich Hamlet in 2015

Personal information
- Full name: Ashley Wayne Carew
- Date of birth: 17 December 1985 (age 40)
- Place of birth: Lambeth, England
- Position: Midfielder

Team information
- Current team: Haywards Heath Town

Senior career*
Years	Team	Apps	(Gls)
2003–2004	Gillingham	0	(0)
2004–2005	Welling United		
2005	→ Worthing (loan)		
2005–2006	Bromley		
2006	Sutton United		
2006–2007	Beckenham Town		
2007	Fisher Athletic	7	(3)
2007–2009	Barnet	43	(2)
2009	→ Eastleigh (loan)		
2009	Eastleigh	19	(1)
2009–2010	Bromley	35	(3)
2010–2011	Ebbsfleet United	41	(2)
2011–2012	Cambridge United	29	(5)
2012	Carshalton Athletic	6	(0)
2012–2013	Ebbsfleet United	27	(0)
2013–2014	Dover Athletic	8	(0)
2014	→ Whitehawk (loan)	5	(2)
2014–2019	Dulwich Hamlet	192	(51)
2019	→ Egham Town (loan)	12	(2)
2019–2021	Beckenham Town	24	(13)
2021	Erith & Belvedere	4	(0)
2021–	Haywards Heath Town	1	(0)
- * Club domestic league appearances and goals as of 21:14, 21 September 2021 (UTC)

Ashley Wayne Carew (born 17 December 1985) is a semi-professional footballer who plays for Haywards Heath Town as a midfielder.

== Career ==
A midfielder, Carew began his career with Gillingham, but was released in 2004. He spent a year out of the game, returning with spells at Beckenham Town and Fisher Athletic.

He was signed by Barnet in 2007. In June 2008 he was called up to the Barbados squad to face the United States, however he turned this down because he was recovering from injury. He was a regular at right-back at the start of the 2008–09 season but soon lost his place. In January 2009 joined Eastleigh on loan, before being recalled by Barnet so they could cancel his contract. Two days later he rejoined Eastleigh on non-contract terms, before joining Bromley at the end of the season.

In August 2010 he joined Conference South side Ebbsfleet United.

On 1 July 2011, he signed a one-year deal with Conference National side Cambridge United becoming manager Jez George's eighth signing of the close season. Despite starting the 2011–12 season well and scoring regularly, the end of the season was curtailed by injury and Carew's contract at The Abbey Stadium was not renewed.

Carew signed for Isthmian League club Carshalton Athletic in the summer of 2012 and played nine times in the red of the Robins before being part of the cull that saw many players leave Colston Avenue two months into the season.

On 12 October 2012, Carew re-signed for Ebbsfleet United.

Carew was released by Ebbsfleet United in May 2013.

Prior to the start of the 2013–14 season Carew signed with Dover Athletic of the Conference South, and despite starting the season in the first team, Carew quickly fell out of favour, spending a month on loan with Whitehawk in February 2014.

Following his release by Dover Athletic at the end of the 2013–14 season, Carew signed for Dulwich Hamlet of the Isthmian League Premier Division in June 2014, finishing his first season at the club as top scorer with 12 goals, and top provider with 10 assists in all competitions, before going on to repeat the feat in his second season at the club, scoring 19 goals and providing 19 assists. His fine career with Dulwich continued in the 2016–17 season, during which he scored 14 goals and provided 15 assists, en route to winning the Supporter's Player of the Year. Carew joined Egham Town on loan in February 2019, where he also assumed the position of assistant manager.

Carew re-joined Beckenham Town for the 2019–20 season, where he was appointed captain. He joined Erith & Belvedere for the 2021–22 season, moving onto Haywards Heath Town in October.
