= 2009–10 Cheltenham Town F.C. season =

Cheltenham Town F.C.
2009–10 season
- Manager: Martin Allen Until 20 October 2009, John Schofield (footballer) Caretaker until 22 December 2009 & Mark Yates From 22 December 2009
- Football League Two: 22nd
- FA Cup: First Round
- League Cup: First Round
- Football League Trophy: First Round

This article documents the 2009–10 season of Gloucestershire football club Cheltenham Town F.C.

== League table ==
Pos	Team	Pld	W	D	L	GF	GA	GD	Pts	Promotion, qualification or relegation
20	Lincoln City	46	13	11	22	42	65	−23	50	
21	Barnet	46	12	12	22	47	63	−16	48	
22	Cheltenham Town	46	10	18	18	54	71	−17	48	
23	Grimsby Town (R)	46	9	17	20	45	71	−26	44	Relegation to Conference National
24	Darlington (R)	46	8	6	32	33	87	−54	30	Relegation to Conference National

Updated to match(es) played on unknown. Source: football-league.co.uk
(R) Relegated

== Results ==
=== League Two ===
8 August 2009 1	Cheltenham Town	2–1	Grimsby Town	Cheltenham
	Ridley 56'; Hayles 68'		Conlon 35'	Stadium: Abbey Business Stadium; Attendance: 3,654

15 August 2009 2	Hereford United	1–1	Cheltenham Town	Hereford
	Godsmark 76'		Hammond 59'	Stadium: Edgar Street; Attendance: 3,280

18 August 2009 3	Rochdale	0–1	Cheltenham Town	Rochdale
			Alsop 90'	Stadium: Spotland; Attendance: 2,311

22 August 2009 4	Cheltenham Town	4–5	Bradford City	Cheltenham
	Hammond 4'; Townsend 12'; Richards 43', 89'		O'Brien 2'; Evans 7'; Hanson 20'; Williams 50'; Townsend 71' (o.g.)	Stadium: Abbey Business Stadium; Attendance: 3,073

29 August 2009 5	Darlington	1–1	Cheltenham Town	Darlington
	Gall 71'		Richards 32'	Stadium: Darlington Arena; Attendance: 1,840

5 September 2009 6	Cheltenham Town	1–1	Dagenham & Redbridge	Cheltenham
	Townsend 81'		Benson 49'	Stadium: Abbey Business Stadium; Attendance: 2,969

12 September 2009 7	Bury	0–1	Cheltenham Town	Bury
			Hayles 90'	Stadium: Gigg Lane; Attendance: 2,130

19 September 2009 8	Cheltenham Town	1–1	Rotherham United	Cheltenham
	Alsop 85'		Le Fondre 45'	Stadium: Abbey Business Stadium; Attendance: 3,088

26 September 2009 9	Aldershot Town	4–1	Cheltenham Town	Aldershot
	Winfield 34'; Charles 69'; Morgan 73'; Donnelly 90'		Richards 65' (pen.)	Stadium: EBB Stadium; Attendance: 2,964

29 September 2009 10	Cheltenham Town	1–2	Shrewsbury Town	Cheltenham
	Hayles 60'		Hibbert 72'; Labadie 74'	Stadium: Abbey Business Stadium; Attendance: 2,928

3 October 2009 11	Cheltenham Town	1–1	Notts County	Cheltenham
	Hammond 75'		Rodgers 26'	Stadium: Abbey Business Stadium; Attendance: 4,134

10 October 2009 12	Accrington Stanley	4–0	Cheltenham Town	Accrington
	Turner 54'; Edwards 59' (pen.); Grant 62', 68'			Stadium: Crown Ground; Attendance: 1,843

16 October 2009 13	Cheltenham Town	1–2	Macclesfield Town	Cheltenham
	Hammond 69'		Sappleton 27'; Rooney 43'	Stadium: Abbey Business Stadium; Attendance: 2,930

24 October 2009 14	Port Vale	1–1	Cheltenham Town	Stoke on Trent
	Richards 9'		Pook 66'	Stadium: Vale Park; Attendance: 4,979

31 October 2009 15	Cheltenham Town	0–4	Crewe Alexandra	Cheltenham
			Zola 29', 73'; Schumacher 37'; Shelley 69'	Stadium: Abbey Business Stadium; Attendance: 3,124

14 November 2009 16	Lincoln City	1–1	Cheltenham Town	Lincoln
	Clarke 48'		Richards 12'	Stadium: Sincil Bank; Attendance: 3,008

21 November 2009 17	Morecambe	1–0	Cheltenham Town	Morecambe
	Wilson 24'			Stadium: Christie Park; Attendance: 1,567

24 November 2009 18	Cheltenham Town	5–1	Barnet	Cheltenham
	Gallinagh 21'; Marshall 37', 86'; Richards 55'; Yakubu 88' (o.g.)		O'Flynn 13'	Stadium: Abbey Business Stadium; Attendance: 2,331

1 December 2009 19	Torquay United	3–0	Cheltenham Town	Torquay
	Zebroski 8'; Scott Rendell 38'; Thomson 48'			Stadium: Plainmoor; Attendance: 2,122

5 December 2009 20	Cheltenham Town	2–2	Northampton Town	Cheltenham
	Hayles 22', 30'		Akinfenwa 23', 47'	Stadium: Abbey Business Stadium; Attendance: 2,824

12 December 2009 21	Chesterfield	1–0	Cheltenham Town	Chesterfield
	Lester 42'			Stadium: Saltergate; Attendance: 3,145

26 December 2009 22	Cheltenham Town	0–1	Bournemouth	Cheltenham
			Feeney 57'	Stadium: Abbey Business Stadium; Attendance: 4,114

28 December 2009 23	Dagenham & Redbridge	0–2	Cheltenham Town	London
			Richards 45'; Low 66'	Stadium: Victoria Road; Attendance: 2,028

2 January 2010 24	Bradford City	1–1	Cheltenham Town	Bradford
	O'Brien 35'		Richards 54' (pen.)	Stadium: Valley Parade; Attendance: 10,831

16 January 2010 25	Grimsby Town	0–0	Cheltenham Town	Grimsby
				Stadium: Blundell Park; Attendance: 3,334

23 January 2010 26	Cheltenham Town	1–4	Rochdale	Cheltenham
	Townsend 90'		O'Grady 18', 49', 90'; Dawson 56'	Stadium: Abbey Business Stadium; Attendance: 4,114

6 February 2010 27	Bournemouth	0–0	Cheltenham Town	Bournemouth
				Stadium: Fitness First Stadium; Attendance: 5,259

9 February 2010 28	Cheltenham Town	0–1	Burton Albion	Cheltenham
			Harrad 7'	Stadium: Abbey Business Stadium; Attendance: 2,593

13 February 2010 29	Barnet	1–1	Cheltenham Town	London
	Adomah 35'		Thornhill 20'	Stadium: Underhill; Attendance: 1,667

20 February 2010 30	Cheltenham Town	2–0	Morecambe	Cheltenham
	Alsop 33'; Thornhill 59'			Stadium: Abbey Business Stadium; Attendance: 2,806

23 February 2010 31	Cheltenham Town	1–1	Torquay United	Cheltenham
	Hayles 34'		Carayol 89'	Stadium: Abbey Business Stadium; Attendance: 2,607

27 February 2010 32	Northampton Town	2–1	Cheltenham Town	Northampton
	Akinfenwa 52'; Harris 85'		Watkins 78'	Stadium: Sixfields; Attendance: 4,428

2 March 2010 33	Cheltenham Town	0–1	Hereford United	Cheltenham
			Green 25'	Stadium: Abbey Business Stadium; Attendance: 3,273

6 March 2010 34	Cheltenham Town	0–1	Chesterfield	Cheltenham
			Conlon 41' (pen.)	Stadium: Abbey Business Stadium; Attendance: 3,006

13 March 2010 35	Burton Albion	5–6	Cheltenham Town	Burton on Trent
	Harrad 2', 32'; Townsend 58' (o.g.); Kabba 72', 85'		Richards 54', 90'; Elito 56'; Pook 84', 87', 90'	Stadium: Pirelli Stadium; Attendance: 2,500

20 March 2010 36	Cheltenham Town	1–1	Port Vale	Cheltenham
	Elito 40'		McCombe 8'	Stadium: Abbey Business Stadium; Attendance: 3,503

27 March 2010 37	Macclesfield Town	1–0	Cheltenham Town	Macclesfield
	Wright 89'			Stadium: Moss Rose; Attendance: 1,572

3 April 2010 38	Cheltenham Town	1–0	Lincoln City	Cheltenham
	Alsop 50'			Stadium: Abbey Business Stadium; Attendance: 3,708

5 April 2010 39	Crewe Alexandra	1–2	Cheltenham Town	Crewe
	Martin 90'		Richards 25', 71' (pen.)	Stadium: Gresty Road; Attendance: 3,488

10 April 2010 40	Cheltenham Town	5–2	Bury	Cheltenham
	Richards 37' (pen.); Thornhill 46'; Low 52', 85'; Hayles 86'		Lowe 80' (pen.), 82'	Stadium: Abbey Business Stadium; Attendance: 3,071

13 April 2010 41	Shrewsbury Town	0–0	Cheltenham Town	Shrewsbury
				Stadium: Prostar Stadium; Attendance: 4,967

17 April 2010 42	Rotherham United	0–0	Cheltenham Town	Sheffield
				Stadium: Don Valley Stadium; Attendance: 3,478

17 April 2010 43	Cheltenham Town	3–3	Darlington	Cheltenham
	Pook 29'; Richards 46'; Elito 64'		Purcell 2'; Eastham 5' (o.g.); Diop 27'	Stadium: Abbey Business Stadium; Attendance: 2,836

24 April 2010 44	Cheltenham Town	1–2	Aldershot Town	Cheltenham
	Richards 14' (pen.)		Donnelly 48' (pen.); Morgan 90'	Stadium: Abbey Business Stadium; Attendance: 3,386

1 May 2010 45	Rotherham United	5–0	Cheltenham Town	Nottingham
	Lee 21'; Hughes 22', 31'; Davies 25'; Rodgers 81'			Stadium: Meadow Lane; Attendance: 11,331

8 May 2010 46	Cheltenham Town	1–1	Accrington Stanley	Cheltenham
	Low 9'		Turner 24'	Stadium: Abbey Business Stadium; Attendance: 3,856

=== FA Cup ===
7 November 2009 Round 1	Torquay United	3–1	Cheltenham Town	Torquay
	Wroe 10' (pen.), 19' (pen.), 70'		Lewis 8'	Stadium: Plainmoor; Attendance: 2,370

=== League Cup ===
11 August 2009 Round 1	Cheltenham Town	1–2	Southend United	Cheltenham
	Hammond 45'		Barnard 77', 88'	Stadium: Abbey Business Stadium; Attendance: 1,918

=== Football League Trophy ===
1 September 2009 Round 1	Cheltenham Town	1–3	Torquay United	Cheltenham
	Low 55'		Stevens 6', 45'; Benyon 31'	Stadium: Abbey Business Stadium; Attendance: 1,397

== Players ==
=== First-team squad ===
Includes all players who were awarded squad numbers during the season.

Note: Flags indicate national team as defined under FIFA eligibility rules; some limited exceptions apply. Players may hold more than one non-FIFA nationality.

No.	Pos.	Nation	Player
1	GK	ENG	Scott Brown
2	DF	ENG	Dave Bird
3	DF	ENG	Lee Ridley
4	DF	NIR	Shane Duff
5	DF	ENG	Michael Townsend
6	MF	ENG	Scott Brown
7	MF	ENG	Michael Pook
8	DF	ENG	Andy Gallinagh
9	FW	ENG	Justin Richards
10	MF	ENG	David Hutton
11	FW	ENG	Louis Almond (on loan from Blackpool)
12	DF	ENG	Kyle Haynes
14	FW	WAL	Marley Watkins
16	DF	ENG	Ashley Eastham

No.	Pos.	Nation	Player
17	MF	ENG	Josh Low
18	DF	ENG	Jack Durrant
19	FW	COD	Medy Elito (on loan from Colchester United)
21	GK	ENG	Will Puddy
22	FW	ENG	Theo Lewis
26	MF	ENG	Josh Emery
28	FW	ENG	Matt Thornhill (on loan from Nottingham Forest)
30	FW	ENG	Jake Lee
31	GK	WAL	Joe Perry
34	FW	ENG	Kiernan Hughes-Mason (on loan from Millwall)
35	DF	ENG	Josh Quaynor
36	DF	ENG	Aaron Lescott (on loan from Bristol Rovers)
38	FW	ENG	Barry Hayles
39	FW	ENG	Julian Alsop

=== Left club during season ===
Note: Flags indicate national team as defined under FIFA eligibility rules; some limited exceptions apply. Players may hold more than one non-FIFA nationality.

No.	Pos.	Nation	Player
15	DF	ENG	Jordan Tabor
21	DF	ENG	Sam Cox (on loan from Tottenham Hotspur)
24	DF	ENG	Ajet Shehu
28	FW	ENG	Romone Rose (on loan from Queens Park Rangers)
27	DF	ISL	Hólmar Örn Eyjólfsson (on loan from West Ham United)
19	FW	ENG	Tom Denton (footballer) (on loan from Huddersfield Town)
16	MF	AUS	Oliver Bozanic (on loan from Reading)
23	MF	ENG	Frankie Artus (on loan from Bristol City)

No.	Pos.	Nation	Player
29	MF	ENG	Ben Marshall (on loan from Stoke City)
40	GK	ENG	Barry Richardson
6	DF	GUI	Drissa Diallo
19	MF	WAL	David Pipe (on loan from Bristol Rovers)
34	MF	ENG	Joss Labadie (on loan from West Bromwich Albion)
11	FW	GHA	Elvis Hammond
27	DF	ENG	Danny Andrew (on loan from Peterborough United)
