= 2010–11 Cheltenham Town F.C. season =

Cheltenham Town F.C.
2010–11 season
- Chairman: Paul Baker
- Manager: Mark Yates
- Football League Two: 17th
- FA Cup: 2nd Round (eliminated by Southampton)
- League Cup: 1st Round (eliminated by Brentford)
- Football League Trophy: Southern Section; 2nd Round (eliminated by Plymouth Argyle)
- Top goalscorer: League: Wes Thomas (18); All: Wes Thomas (19)
- Highest home attendance: 4,349 vs. Oxford United, 28 September 2010
- Lowest home attendance: 1,597 vs. Plymouth Argyle, 5 October 2010
- Average home league attendance: 2,980
Home colours	Away colours

This page shows the progress of Cheltenham Town F.C. in the 2010–11 football season. This year they played their games in League Two in the English league system.

== Results ==
=== League Two ===
7 August 2010	Gillingham	1–1	Cheltenham Town	Priestfield Stadium
15:00	Akinfenwa 76'		Thomas 53'	Attendance: 5,655

14 August 2010	Cheltenham Town	3–2	Crewe Alexandra	Abbey Business Stadium
15:00	Thomas 22', 42'; Goulding 62'		Ada 4'; Zola 49'	Attendance: 3,537

21 August 2010	Rotherham United	6–4	Cheltenham Town	Don Valley Stadium
15:00	Le Fondre 16', 48', 50', 66'; Harrison 41'; Cresswell 55'		Goulding 4'; Thomas 28'; Jeffers 36'; Lowe 90'	Attendance: 3,072

28 August 2010	Cheltenham Town	2–1	Burton Albion	Abbey Business Stadium
15:00	Thomas 80'; Low 82'		Harrad 36'	Attendance: 3,221

4 September 2010	Barnet	3–1	Cheltenham Town	Underhill Stadium
15:00	Walsh 12', 65'; Marshall 80'		Artus 2'	Attendance: 2,082

11 September 2010	Cheltenham Town	1–0	Stevenage	Abbey Business Stadium
15:00	Thomas 69'		Wilson (red card) 90'	Attendance: 2,805

18 September 2010	Chesterfield	3–0	Cheltenham Town	B2net Stadium
15:00	Talbot 14'; Davies 48', 66'			Attendance: 5,503

25 September 2010	Cheltenham Town	0–2	Bury	Abbey Business Stadium
15:00			Lowe 11' (pen.); Jones 85'	Attendance: 2,758

28 September 2010	Cheltenham Town	1–1	Oxford United	Abbey Business Stadium
19:45	Thomas 29'		Midson 60'	Attendance: 4,349

2 October 2010	Aldershot Town	0–2	Cheltenham Town	Recreation Ground
15:00			Andrew 13'; Goulding 62'	Attendance: 2,509

9 October 2010	Cheltenham Town	1–0	Northampton Town	Abbey Business Stadium
15:00	Smikle 60'		Beckwith (red card) 22'	Attendance: 3,016

16 October 2010	Bradford City	3–1	Cheltenham Town	Valley Parade
15:00	Syers 32'; Hendrie 74'; Hanson 87'		Low 7'	Attendance: 10,537

23 October 2010	Cheltenham Town	0–0	Port Vale	Abbey Business Stadium
15:00				Attendance: 3,167

30 October 2010	Accrington Stanley	2–4	Cheltenham Town	Crown Ground
15:00	Gornell 51'; Edwards 88' (pen.)		Smikle 4'; Goulding 18', 74'; Shroot 80'	Attendance: 1,427

13 November 2010	Hereford United	1–1	Cheltenham Town	Edgar Street
15:00	Manset 45'		Goulding 65'	Attendance: 3,264

20 November 2010	Cheltenham Town	1–1	Morecambe	Abbey Business Stadium
15:00	Low 43'		Jevons 80' (pen.)	Attendance: 2,524

23 November 2010	Macclesfield Town	0–2	Cheltenham Town	Moss Rose
19:45			Low 8'; Smikle 32'	Attendance: 1,870

11 December 2010	Shrewsbury Town	1–1	Cheltenham Town	Greenhous Meadow
15:00	Bradshaw 89'		Thomas 26'	Attendance: 4,901

14 December 2010	Cheltenham Town	0–2	Southend United	Abbey Business Stadium
19:45			Midson 8', 14'	Attendance: 2,229

28 December 2010	Cheltenham Town	4–0	Bradford City	Abbey Business Stadium
15:00	Goulding 31', 67'; Pack 35'; Thomas 76'			Attendance: 2,666

1 January 2011	Cheltenham Town	1–2	Wycombe Wanderers	Abbey Business Stadium
15:00	Andrew 12'		Beavon 44'; Ainsworth 58'	Attendance: 3,326

3 January 2011	Southend United	1–2	Cheltenham Town	Roots Hall
15:00	Corr 77'		Pack 4'; Thomas 5'	Attendance: 4,942

8 January 2011	Northampton Town	1–1	Cheltenham Town	Sixfields Stadium
15:00	McKay 9'		Thomas 48'	Attendance: 4,031

15 January 2011	Cheltenham Town	1–2	Accrington Stanley	Abbey Business Stadium
15:00	Thomas 83'		Gornell 39'; Richardson 89'	Attendance: 2,736

22 January 2011	Port Vale	0–1	Cheltenham Town	Vale Park
15:00	Owen (red card) 39'		Goulding 55'	Attendance: 5,163

25 January 2011	Cheltenham Town	1–2	Lincoln City	Abbey Business Stadium
19:45	Artus 31'		Hunt 9'; O'Keefe 22'	Attendance: 2,292

29 January 2011	Oxford United	1–1	Cheltenham Town	Kassam Stadium
15:00	Craddock 33'		Thomas 25'	Attendance: 7,738

1 February 2011	Wycombe Wanderers	2–1	Cheltenham Town	Adams Park
19:45	Strevens 28'; Ainsworth 54'		Thomas 56'	Attendance: 3,409

5 February 2011	Morecambe	1–1	Cheltenham Town	Globe Arena
15:00	Drummond 58'		Artus 69'	Attendance: 1,691

12 February 2011	Cheltenham Town	0–3	Hereford United	Abbey Business Stadium
15:00			Fairhurst 23', 89'; Kovács 51'	Attendance: 3,643

19 February 2011	Cheltenham Town	1–1	Barnet	Abbey Business Stadium
15:00	Thomas 61'		Devera 90+2'	Attendance: 2,926

22 February 2011	Cheltenham Town	2–2	Torquay United	Abbey Business Stadium
19:45	Goulding 79'; Thomas 90+4'		Robinson 14'; Stevens 65'	Attendance: 2,977

26 February 2011	Stevenage	4–0	Cheltenham Town	Lamex Stadium
15:00	Roberts 14'; Harrison 33', 54'; Bostwick 52'			Attendance: 2,733

1 March 2011	Cheltenham Town	2–1	Stockport County	Abbey Business Stadium
19:45	Thomson 22'; Thomas 67'		Brown 39'	Attendance: 2,191

5 March 2011	Cheltenham Town	0–3	Chesterfield	Abbey Business Stadium
15:00			Davies 34', 87'; Djilali 47'	Attendance: 2,870

12 March 2011	Cheltenham Town	1–2	Aldershot Town	Abbey Business Stadium
15:00	Pook 83'		Charles 10'; Vincenti 55'	Attendance: 2,697

26 February 2011	Bury	2–3	Cheltenham Town	Gigg Lane
15:00	Futcher 9'; Haworth 68'		Gallinagh 3'; Low 7', 68'	Attendance: 2,870

22 March 2011	Torquay United	2–1	Cheltenham Town	Plainmoor
19:45	Branston 28'; Murray 71'		Andrew 89'	Attendance: 2,186

27 March 2011	Cheltenham Town	1–2	Gillingham	Abbey Business Stadium
14:00	Elliott 3'		McDonald 86', 90'	Attendance: 3,157

2 April 2011	Crewe Alexandra	8–1	Cheltenham Town	Alexandra Stadium
15:00	Donaldson 4', 33', 67' (pen.); Miller 11'; Grant 37', 73', 88' (pen.); A R Westwood 58'		Thomas 50'	Attendance: 3,682

9 April 2011	Cheltenham Town	1–1	Rotherham United	Abbey Business Stadium
15:00	Gallinagh 62'		J Taylor 11'	Attendance: 2,413

16 April 2011	Burton Albion	2–0	Cheltenham Town	Pirelli Stadium
15:00	Greg Pearson 31' (pen.); Maghoma 79'		Gallinagh (red card) 30'	Attendance: 2,444

23 April 2011	Cheltenham Town	0–1	Macclesfield Town	Abbey Business Stadium
15:00			Barnett 27'	Attendance: 2,757

25 April 2011	Lincoln City	0–2	Cheltenham Town	Sincil Bank
15:00			Low 65'; Andrew 88'	Attendance: 3,007

30 April 2011	Cheltenham Town	0–1	Shrewsbury Town	Abbey Business Stadium
15:00			Wright 10'	Attendance: 4,288

7 May 2011	Stockport County	1–1	Cheltenham Town	Edgeley Park
15:00	Tansey 90+10' (pen.)		Smikle 23'	Attendance: 5,027

=== FA Cup ===
6 November 2010 Round 1	Cheltenham Town	1–0	Morecambe	Abbey Business Stadium
15:00	Thomas 80'			Attendance: 2,066

27 November 2010 Round 2	Southampton	3–0	Cheltenham Town	St Mary's Stadium
15:00	Lallana 8'; Guly 50'; Gobern 87'			Attendance: 9,276

=== League Cup ===
10 August 2010 Round 1	Brentford	2–1	Cheltenham Town	Griffin Park
19:45	Simpson 31'; Woodman 35'		Jeffers 61'	Attendance: 2,049

=== Football League Trophy ===
5 October 2010 Round 1	Cheltenham Town	0–2	Plymouth Argyle	Abbey Business Stadium
19:45			MacLean 10'; Noone 46'	Attendance: 1,597

== Football League Two ==
=== League table ===
Pos	Team	Pld	W	D	L	GF	GA	GD	Pts
15	Macclesfield Town	46	14	13	19	59	73	−14	55
16	Northampton Town	46	11	19	16	63	71	−8	52
17	Cheltenham Town	46	13	13	20	56	77	−21	52
18	Bradford City	46	15	7	24	43	68	−25	52
19	Burton Albion	46	12	15	19	56	70	−14	51

Updated to match(es) played on 28 May 2011. Source: The Football League
Rules for classification: 1) points; 2) goal difference; 3) number of goals scored.

=== Results summary ===
Overall								Home						Away					
Pld	W	D	L	GF	GA	GD	Pts	W	D	L	GF	GA	GD	W	D	L	GF	GA	GD
46	13	13	20	56	77	−21	52	6	6	11	24	32	−8	7	7	9	32	45	−13

Last updated: 11 May 2011.
Source: BBC Sport

=== Results by round ===
Round	1	2	3	4	5	6	7	8	9	10	11	12	13	14	15	16	17	18	19	20	21	22	23	24	25	26	27	28	29	30	31	32	33	34	35	36	37	38	39	40	41	42	43	44	45	46
Ground	A	H	A	H	A	H	A	H	H	A	H	A	H	A	A	H	A	A	H	H	H	A	A	H	A	H	A	A	A	H	H	H	A	H	H	H	A	A	H	A	H	A	H	A	H	A
Result	D	W	L	W	L	W	L	L	D	W	W	L	D	W	D	D	W	D	L	W	L	W	D	L	W	L	D	L	D	L	D	D	L	W	L	L	W	L	L	L	D	L	L	W	L	D
Position			12	6	12	6	8	15	16	12	7	10	9	7	11	10	8	8	8	7	8	7	8	10	9	10	10	11	11	12	12	13	14	12	13	16	15	15	15	15	17	16	18	17	18	17

Updated to match(es) played on 11 May 2011. Source: Results
A = Away; H = Home; W = Win; D = Draw; L = Loss

== Appearances and goals ==
As of 6 May 2011.
(Substitute appearances in brackets)

No.	Pos.	Name	League		FA Cup		League Cup		League Trophy		Total		Discipline	
No.	Pos.	Name	Apps	Goals	Apps	Goals	Apps	Goals	Apps	Goals	Apps	Goals	Yellow card	Red card
1	GK	(England) Scott Brown	46	0	2	0	1	0	1	0	50	0	2	0
2	DF	(England) Keith Lowe	36	0	2	0	1	0	1	0	40	0	2	0
3	DF	(England) Danny Andrew	43	4	1	0	1	0	1	0	46	4	6	0
4	MF	(England) Dave Bird	27 (12)	0	2	0	0	0	1	0	30 (12)	0	1	0
5	DF	(England) Andy Gallinagh	20 (4)	2	2	0	0	0	1	0	23 (4)	2	0	0
6	DF	(England) Martin Riley	26	0	2	0	1	0	0	0	29	0	3	0
7	MF	(England) Michael Pook	25 (4)	1	0 (1)	0	1	0	1	0	27 (5)	1	7	0
8	MF	(Wales) Josh Low	28 (2)	8	2	0	1	0	1	0	32 (2)	8	4	0
9	FW	(England) Wes Thomas	40 (1)	18	0 (2)	1	0	0	0	0	40 (3)	19	4	0
10	FW	(England) Jeff Goulding	34 (5)	10	2	0	1	0	1	0	38 (5)	10	4	0
11	MF	(England) Brian Smikle	37 (9)	4	2	0	1	0	1	0	41 (9)	4	0	0
14	MF	(Republic of Ireland) JJ Melligan	14 (13)	0	1	0	0 (1)	0	0	0	15 (14)	0	0	0
15	MF	(England) Marley Watkins	0 (1)	0	0	1	0	0	0	0	0 (1)	0	0	0
16	DF	(England) Kyle Haynes	1	0	0	0	0	0	0	0	1	0	0	0
17	FW	(England) Theo Lewis	8 (14)	0	0	0	0	0	0 (1)	0	8 (15)	0	1	0
20	MF	(England) Frankie Artus	21 (8)	3	0	0	1	0	0	0	22 (8)	3	4	0
21	FW	(England) Shaun Jeffers	3 (19)	1	0 (1)	0	1	1	1	0	5 (20)	2	3	0
22	DF	(England) Steve Elliott	39 (2)	1	0 (1)	0	1	0	1	0	41 (3)	1	1	0
23	MF	(Northern Ireland) Robin Shroot	4 (3)	1	2	0	0 (1)	0	0 (1)	0	6 (5)	1	0	0
23	FW	(England) Matt Green	10 (9)	0	0	0	0	0	0	0	10 (9)	0	1	0
24	MF	(England) Marlon Pack	31 (6)	2	2	0	0	0	0 (1)	0	33 (6)	2	3	0
26	DF	(England) Ashley Eastham	8 (1)	0	0	0	0	0	0	0	8 (1)	0	1	0
27	FW	(England) Phil Walsh	1 (4)	0	0	0	0	0	0	0	1 (4)	0	0	0
28	MF	(Trinidad and Tobago) Jake Thomson	3 (2)	1	0	0	0	0	0	0	3 (2)	1	0	0
29	MF	(England) Medy Elito	1 (1)	0	0	0	0	0	0	0	1 (1)	0	0	0

== Awards ==
End of Season Awards	Winner
Supporters' Player of the Season	Keith Lowe
Junior Robins' Player of the Season	Wes Thomas
Norwegian Robins' Player of the Season	Josh Low
Players' Player of the Season	Wes Thomas
Young Player of the Season	Danny Andrew

== Transfers ==
Players transferred in
Date	Pos.	Name	From	Fee	Ref.
19 May 2010	MF	(England) Brian Smikle	(England) Kidderminster Harriers	Free	
10 June 2010	FW	(England) Jeff Goulding	(England) A.F.C. Bournemouth	Free	
21 June 2010	GK	(England) Daniel Lloyd-Weston	(England) Port Vale	Free	
22 June 2010	DF	(England) Danny Andrew	(England) Peterborough United	Free	
28 June 2010	DF	(England) Keith Lowe	(England) Hereford United	Free	
1 July 2010	MF	(England) Frankie Artus	(England) Bristol City	Free	
1 July 2010	FW	(England) Wes Thomas	(England) Dagenham & Redbridge	Free	
2 July 2010	MF	(Republic of Ireland) JJ Melligan	(Republic of Ireland) Dundalk	Free	
17 July 2010	DF	(England) Steve Elliott	(England) Bristol Rovers	Free	
17 July 2010	DF	(England) Martin Riley	(England) Kidderminster Harriers	Undisclosed	
Players loaned in
Date from	Pos.	Name	From	Date to	Ref.
6 August 2010	FW	(England) Shaun Jeffers	(England) Coventry City	31 January 2011	
6 August 2010	FW	(Northern Ireland) Robin Shroot	(England) Birmingham City	1 January 2011	
31 August 2010	MF	(England) Marlon Pack	(England) Portsmouth	End of season	
6 January 2011	FW	(England) Phil Walsh	(England) Dagenham & Redbridge	6 February 2011	
6 January 2011	DF	(England) Ashley Eastham	(England) Blackpool	6 April 2011	
31 January 2011	FW	(England) Matt Green	(England) Oxford United	End of season	
25 February 2011	MF	(Trinidad and Tobago) Jake Thomson	(England) Exeter City	25 March 2011	
25 February 2011	MF	(England) Medy Elito	(England) Colchester United	22 March 2011	
Players loaned out
Date from	Pos.	Name	To	Date to	Ref.
27 August 2010	MF	(England) Josh Emery	(England) Cirencester Town	27 September 2010	
2 September 2010	FW	(England) Jake Lee	(England) Cirencester Town	2 October 2010	
23 September 2010	MF	(England) Marley Watkins	(England) Bath City	24 December 2010	
26 November 2010	FW	(England) Jake Lee	(England) Bishop's Cleeve	26 December 2010	
2 December 2010	FW	(England) Kyle Haynes	(England) Salisbury City	26 December 2010	
27 January 2011	MF	(England) Marley Watkins	(England) Bath City	29 January 2011	
8 March 2011	FW	(England) Kyle Haynes	(England) Hednesford Town	8 April 2011	
19 March 2011	FW	(England) Jake Lee	(England) Thurrock	19 April 2011	
Players released
Date	Pos.	Name	Subsequent club	Join date	Ref.
1 July 2010	MF	(England) Justin Richards	(England) Port Vale	11 June 2010 (Bosman)	
15 July 2010	DF	(England) Michael Townsend	(England) Hereford United	25 June 2010	
1 July 2010	MF	(England) Lee Ridley	(England) Grimsby Town	25 June 2010	
1 July 2010	FW	(England) Julian Alsop	(England) Bishops Cleeve	3 September 2010	
1 July 2010	DF	(Northern Ireland) Shane Duff	(England) Bradford City	4 September 2010	
1 July 2010	FW	(Jamaica) Barry Hayles	(England) Truro City	18 September 2010	
1 July 2010	GK	(England) Will Puddy	(England) Salisbury City	25 October 2010	
1 July 2010	MF	(Republic of Ireland) David Hutton	(England) St. Albans City	3 November 2010	
13 December 2010	MF	(England) Josh Emery	Unattached		
29 January 2011	MF	(England) Marley Watkins	(England) Bath City	29 January 2011	
