= 2008–09 Cheltenham Town F.C. season =

Cheltenham Town F.C.
2008–09 season
- Manager: Keith Downing (until 13 September); Martin Allen (from 15 September)
- Stadium: Whaddon Road
- League One: 23rd (relegated)
- FA Cup: Third round
- League Cup: Second round
- Football League Trophy: Second round
Home colours	Away colours

During the 2008–09 English football season, Cheltenham Town F.C. competed in Football League One.

== Season summary ==
A 4–1 defeat at Hartlepool United saw manager Keith Downing depart by mutual consent in September. His replacement was Martin Allen, the son of former Robins manager Dennis. Allen was unable to improve results enough for Cheltenham to escape the drop.

== Kit ==
Italian company Erreà continued as Cheltenham's kit manufacturers, while Cheltenham-based plumbing company Mira Showers began sponsoring the kits. For the first time in 15 years, Cheltenham wore kits with no stripes, with Erreà instead opting for a plain red design with asymmetric white trim. The away kit was yellow with red piping.

== First-team squad ==
Squad at end of season

Note: Flags indicate national team as defined under FIFA eligibility rules; some limited exceptions apply. Players may hold more than one non-FIFA nationality.

No.	Pos.	Nation	Player
1	GK	(England) ENG	Shane Higgs
3	DF	(England) ENG	Alan Wright
4	DF	(Northern Ireland) NIR	Shane Duff
5	DF	(England) ENG	Gavin Caines
6	DF	(England) ENG	Michael Townsend
7	MF	(Wales) WAL	Josh Low
8	MF	(England) ENG	John Finnigan
9	FW	(England) ENG	Paul Connor
10	FW	(England) ENG	Damian Spencer
12	GK	(England) ENG	Scott Brown
14	MF	(England) ENG	Dave Bird
16	MF	(England) ENG	Alex Russell
17	DF	(England) ENG	Andy Lindegaard
18	FW	(England) ENG	Ashley Vincent
19	DF	(England) ENG	Lee Ridley
20	DF	(England) ENG	Andy Gallinagh
21	GK	(England) ENG	Will Puddy
22	MF	(Hong Kong) HKG	Aaron Ledgister

No.	Pos.	Nation	Player
28	MF	(England) ENG	Marley Watkins
29	DF	(Guinea) GUI	Drissa Diallo (on loan from Milton Keynes Dons)
25	DF	(England) ENG	Kyle Haynes
26	DF	(England) ENG	Jake Lee
27	FW	(Ghana) GHA	Lloyd Owusu
30	MF	(England) ENG	Josh Emery
32	MF	(England) ENG	Theo Lewis
33	MF	(England) ENG	Frankie Artus (on loan from Bristol City)
36	GK	(Wales) WAL	Joe Perry
37	MF	(England) ENG	Lewis Fathers
38	MF	(England) ENG	Ian Westlake
39	FW	(Ghana) GHA	Elvis Hammond
40	DF	(England) ENG	Jack Durrant
42	FW	(England) ENG	Dean Maynard
43	MF	(England) ENG	Michail Antonio (on loan from Reading)
45	DF	(Spain) ESP	Yuri Berchiche (on loan from Tottenham Hotspur)
46	MF	(Republic of Ireland) IRL	David Hutton
47	MF	(Northern Ireland) NIR	Cathal Tosh

=== Left club during season ===
Note: Flags indicate national team as defined under FIFA eligibility rules; some limited exceptions apply. Players may hold more than one non-FIFA nationality.

No.	Pos.	Nation	Player
1	GK	(England) ENG	Shane Higgs (on loan to Wolverhampton Wanderers)
2	DF	(England) ENG	Jerry Gill (on loan to Forest Green Rovers)
7	MF	(Wales) WAL	Josh Low (on loan to Forest Green Rovers)
11	MF	(England) ENG	Scott Brown (on loan to Port Vale)
13	DF	(England) ENG	Craig Armstrong (on loan to Burton Albion)
15	DF	(England) ENG	Ben Gill (to Crawley Town)
23/24	FW	(Jamaica) JAM	Barry Hayles (on loan from Leicester City)
23	MF	(Republic of Ireland) IRL	Jonny Hayes (on loan from Leicester City)
24	MF	(England) ENG	Jennison Myrie-Williams (on loan from Bristol City)
24	DF	(England) ENG	Lathaniel Rowe-Turner (on loan from Leicester City)
25	MF	(England) ENG	Dean Sinclair (on loan from Charlton Athletic)

No.	Pos.	Nation	Player
25	FW	(Wales) WAL	Stuart Fleetwood (on loan from Charlton Athletic)
25	DF	(England) ENG	Chris Westwood (on loan from Peterborough United)
26	MF	(Scotland) SCO	Scott Murray (on loan from Bristol City)
31	MF	(England) ENG	Josh Payne (on loan from West Ham United)
33	MF	(England) ENG	Lewis Montrose (on loan from Wigan Athletic)
34	MF	(Australia) AUS	James Wesolowski (on loan from Leicester City)
35	MF	(England) ENG	Darren Kenton (released)
35	FW	(England) ENG	Leon Constantine (on loan from Northampton Town)
41	FW	(England) ENG	Nicholas Bignall (on loan from Reading)
44	FW	(England) ENG	Ashley Hemmings (on loan from Wolverhampton Wanderers)
