= Theo Lewis =

English footballer (born 1991)

Personal information
- Full name: Theo Anthony Lewis
- Date of birth: 10 August 1991 (age 35)
- Place of birth: Oxford, England
- Position: Midfielder

Team information
- Current team: Salisbury (player-coach)

Youth career
- Chelsea
- Reading
- 2007–2009: Cheltenham Town

Senior career*
Years	Team	Apps	(Gls)
2009–2012	Cheltenham Town	39	(1)
2012	→ Gloucester City (loan)	9	(3)
2012–2014	Salisbury City	75	(6)
2014–2015	Woking	24	(2)
2015–2016	Ebbsfleet United	15	(1)
2015–2016	→ Havant & Waterlooville (loan)	21	(0)
2016–2019	Havant & Waterlooville	116	(28)
2019–2022	Gosport Borough	48	(9)
2022	Banbury United	5	(0)
2022–2023	Cirencester Town		
2023–	Salisbury	8	(0)
- * Club domestic league appearances and goals as of 14:16, 2 February 2024 (UTC)

Theo Anthony Lewis (born 10 August 1991) is an English footballer who is player-coach at National League South club Salisbury.

== Club career ==
Lewis started his career as a youth player at Chelsea and Reading before joining Cheltenham Town for the 2007–08 season. He made his first team debut in a League One match against Scunthorpe United in the 3–0 away defeat on 28 April 2009, replacing Kyle Haynes as a substitute in the 73rd minute.

Having been a squad player for much of 2009–10 and 2010–11 seasons, Lewis found himself out of the first team picture in 2011–12 and went out on loan to rivals Gloucester City on 12 March 2012, originally for a month which was extended to the rest of the season. After the end of Gloucester's season, Lewis returned to Cheltenham and made his only League Two appearance in their final league game against Plymouth Argyle. In May 2012, Lewis was released by Cheltenham after the expiry of his contract.

Following his release from Cheltenham, Theo trialled at Salisbury City. This proved successful as he later signed for the club after impressing manager Darrell Clarke with his footballing ability as well as his enthusiasm and professionalism. He played in the majority of matches during the 2012–13 season as a midfielder. He signed a new deal in the pre-season period ahead of the 2013–14 season, keeping him with Salisbury for another year.

Following financial troubles, Salisbury City were forced to offload a number of their players during the summer and as a result Lewis went on to sign for Woking for the 2014–15 season.

Lewis unexpectedly left Woking at the start of the new year once the transfer window opened. He went on to sign for Ebbsfleet United for an undisclosed fee. After failing to make an impression under Ebbsfleet United manager Daryl McMahon, Lewis joined National League South side Havant & Waterlooville on a two-month loan in November 2015. After numerous loan extensions to Lewis's spell with Havant & Waterlooville, his stay was made permanent in July 2016.

On 26 February 2022, Lewis signed for Southern League side Banbury United.

In July 2022, Lewis joined Southern League Division One Central club Cirencester Town.

== Career statistics ==
As of match played 31 October 2020.

Club	Season	League			FA Cup		League Cup		Other		Total	
Club	Season	Division	Apps	Goals	Apps	Goals	Apps	Goals	Apps	Goals	Apps	Goals
Cheltenham Town	2008–09	League One	2	0	0	0	0	0	0	0	2	0
Cheltenham Town	2009–10	League Two	15	0	1	1	0	0	0	0	16	1
Cheltenham Town	2010–11	League Two	21	0	0	0	0	0	1 (Note: Appearance(s) in Football League Trophy)	0	22	0
Cheltenham Town	2011–12	League Two	1	0	0	0	0	0	2	0	3	0
Cheltenham Town	Total		39	0	1	1	0	0	3	0	43	1
Gloucester City (loan)	2011–12	Conference South	9	3	0	0	—		0	0	9	3
Salisbury City	2012–13	Conference South	38	2	0	0	—		4 (Note: Appearance(s) in FA Trophy) (Note: Appearance(s) in 2012–13 Conference South play-offs)	0	42	2
Salisbury City	2013–14	Conference Premier	37	3	3	1	—		1	0	41	4
Salisbury City	Total		75	5	3	1	—		5	0	83	6
Woking	2014–15	Conference Premier	24	2	2	0	—		0	0	26	2
Ebbsfleet United	2014–15	Conference South	15	1	0	0	—		4	0	19	1
Havant & Waterlooville (loan)	2015–16	National League South	21	0	0	0	—		3	0	24	0
Havant & Waterlooville	2016–17	Isthmian League Premier Division	41	15	3	0	—		2	0	46	15
Havant & Waterlooville	2017–18	National League South	40	9	3	0	—		2	0	45	9
Havant & Waterlooville	2018–19	National League	35	4	1	0	—		2	0	38	4
Havant & Waterlooville	Total		116	28	7	0	—		6	0	129	28
Gosport Borough	2019–20	Southern League Premier Division South	29	4	0	0	—		4	1	33	5
Gosport Borough	2020–21	Southern League Premier Division South	3	2	0	0	—		1	0	4	2
Gosport Borough	Total		32	6	0	0	—		5	1	37	7
Career total			331	45	13	2	0	0	26	1	370	48
