= David Hutton =

David Hutton may refer to:

- David Hutton (footballer, born 1985), Scottish football goalkeeper
- David Hutton (footballer, born 1989), Irish football midfielder
- David Graham Hutton (1904–1988), British economist, author and politician
