= Keith Lowe =

English footballer (born 1985)

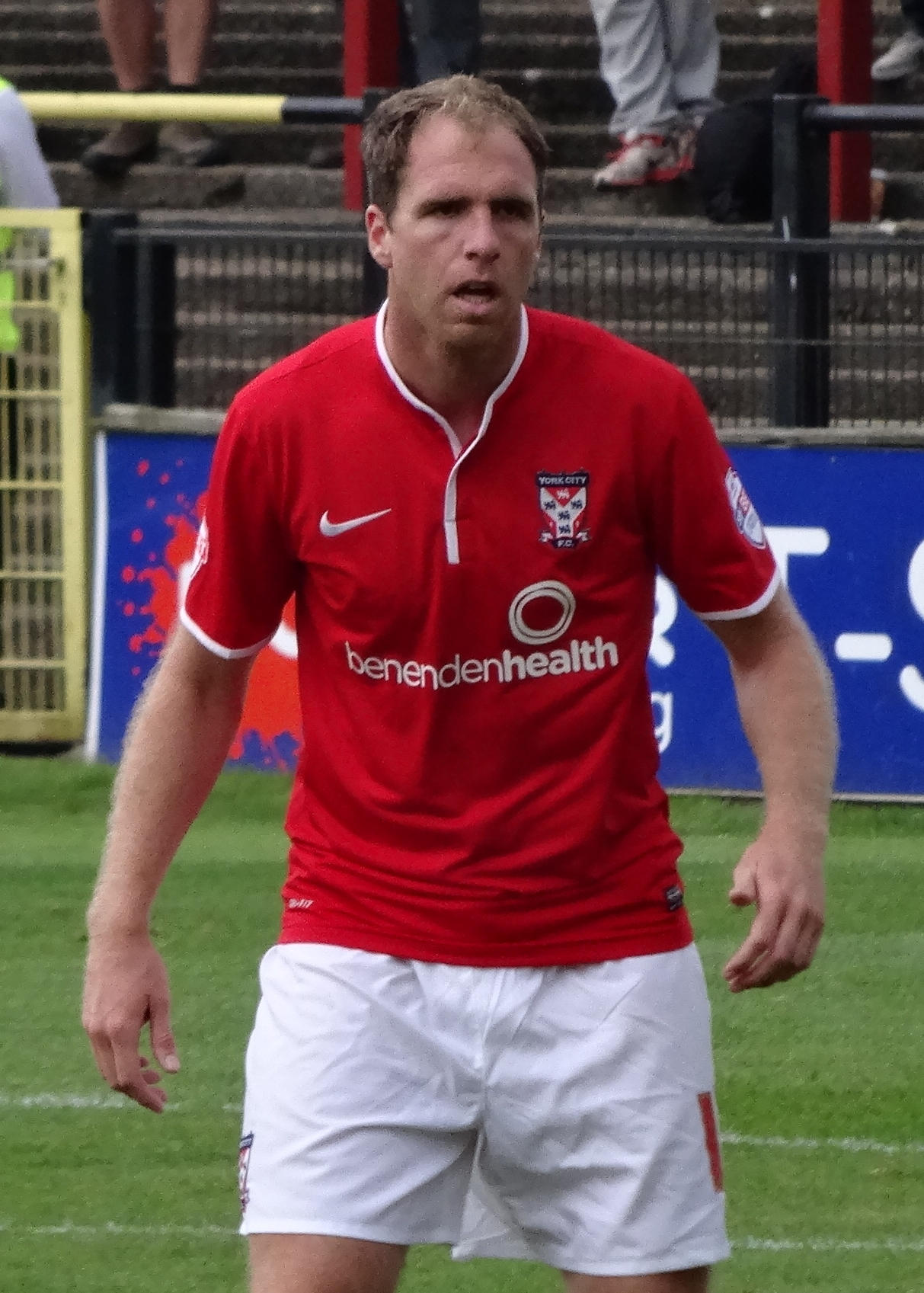
- Lowe playing for York City in 2014

Personal information
- Full name: Keith Stephen Lowe
- Date of birth: 13 September 1985 (age 41)
- Place of birth: Wolverhampton, England
- Height: 6 ft 2 in (1.88 m)
- Position: Centre back

Youth career
- –2004: Wolverhampton Wanderers

Senior career*
Years	Team	Apps	(Gls)
2004–2008	Wolverhampton Wanderers	14	(0)
2005	→ Burnley (loan)	16	(0)
2006	→ Queens Park Rangers (loan)	1	(0)
2006	→ Swansea City (loan)	4	(0)
2006	→ Brighton & Hove Albion (loan)	0	(0)
2006	→ Cheltenham Town (loan)	8	(0)
2007	→ Cheltenham Town (loan)	8	(1)
2007–2008	→ Port Vale (loan)	28	(3)
2008–2009	Kidderminster Harriers	43	(4)
2009–2010	Hereford United	19	(1)
2010–2014	Cheltenham Town	111	(7)
2013–2014	→ York City (loan)	9	(0)
2014–2015	York City	83	(8)
2016–2017	Kidderminster Harriers	62	(6)
2017–2019	Macclesfield Town	59	(1)
2019	Nuneaton Borough	8	(0)
2019–2020	Bradford (Park Avenue)	13	(0)
2020–2022	Kidderminster Harriers	48	(2)
2022	Rushall Olympic		
2022–2023	Hednesford Town	13	(0)
Total		547	(33)
- * Club domestic league appearances and goals

Keith Stephen Lowe (born 13 September 1985) is an English former professional footballer who played as a centre back. He made over 634 league and cup appearances in a 19-year playing career.

A Wolverhampton Wanderers academy graduate, between 2005 and 2008 he was loaned out seven times: Burnley, Queens Park Rangers, Swansea City, Brighton & Hove Albion, Cheltenham Town (twice) and Port Vale. He then dropped out of the Football League to spend the 2008–09 season as a Kidderminster Harriers player. He then spent a season with Hereford United before signing with Cheltenham Town in 2010. He was voted Cheltenham's Player of the Year in 2011. He joined League Two club York City, initially on loan, in November 2013. In January 2016, he rejoined Kidderminster Harriers before moving on to Macclesfield Town in June 2017. He helped Macclesfield to win promotion as champions of the National League at the end of the 2017–18 season. He started the 2019–20 season at Nuneaton Borough before moving on to Bradford (Park Avenue) in September 2019. He returned to Kidderminster Harriers again in January 2020. In the summer of 2022, Lowe announced he would be moving to part-time football to facilitate a career in teaching, and subsequently played for Rushall Olympic and Hednesford Town.

== Career ==
=== Wolverhampton Wanderers ===
Born in Wolverhampton, West Midlands, Lowe was a product of Wolverhampton Wanderers' academy. Manager Dave Jones handed him his first-team debut on 23 August 2004, in a 4–2 win at Rochdale in the League Cup. He signed his first professional contract of three and a half years in November 2004, however, he was unable to claim a regular first-team place at Molineux and was first loaned out to Burnley at the start of the 2005–06 season. At Burnley he scored his first goal in professional football in a 3–0 League Cup win over Barnsley at Turf Moor on 20 September. Following his return in December 2005, he joined Queens Park Rangers on a one-month loan in February 2006, After playing just one QPR match, he had rather more success at Swansea City in March 2006, playing six matches in all, and winning the Football League Trophy. Lowe played all ninety minutes of the 2006 Football League Trophy final, as Swansea beat Carlisle United 2–1.

He started the 2006–07 campaign on loan at Brighton & Hove Albion, without making an appearance for the first-team. Manager Mark McGhee had Adam Hinshelwood and Guy Butters out injured, whilst Joel Lynch was a doubt and admitted that he was short of cover on the bench before Georges Santos was signed and said after Lowe arrived that "we don't think for a minute that we are signing Rio Ferdinand". A two-month loan spell with Cheltenham Town started in September 2006, they appreciated him so much that he was invited back to spend the 2007 end of the season with them.

Lowe spent the whole of 2007–08 with Port Vale and made 31 appearances as the club suffered relegation out of League One in 23rd place.

=== Kidderminster Harriers ===
In May 2008, Lowe was released by his parent club. He subsequently signed for Conference Premier club Kidderminster Harriers and played 52 matches in 2008–09 before being released due to budgetary concerns.

=== Hereford United ===
In May 2009, he signed with League Two club Hereford United, but was released at the end of 2009–10 after making 25 appearances. His only goal for the "Bulls" came in a 2–1 win over Darlington at Edgar Street on 31 October.

=== Cheltenham Town ===
Lowe joined Cheltenham Town permanently in June 2010, becoming the club's first choice right-back before his season was prematurely ended by an ankle injury in the home defeat to Gillingham on 27 March 2011. His consistency endeared him to the Cheltenham fans who named him as their Player of the Year for 2010–11. An appearance clause in his contract also ensured he would remain at the club until summer 2012. He made 31 league appearances in 2011–12 to help Mark Yates' team book a place in the League Two play-off places. He was an unused substitute in the final at Wembley Stadium, as Cheltenham lost 2–0 to Crewe Alexandra. On 27 October 2012, he scored two goals in a 3–0 win over Exeter City at Whaddon Road to earn himself a place on the League Two team of the week.

=== York City ===
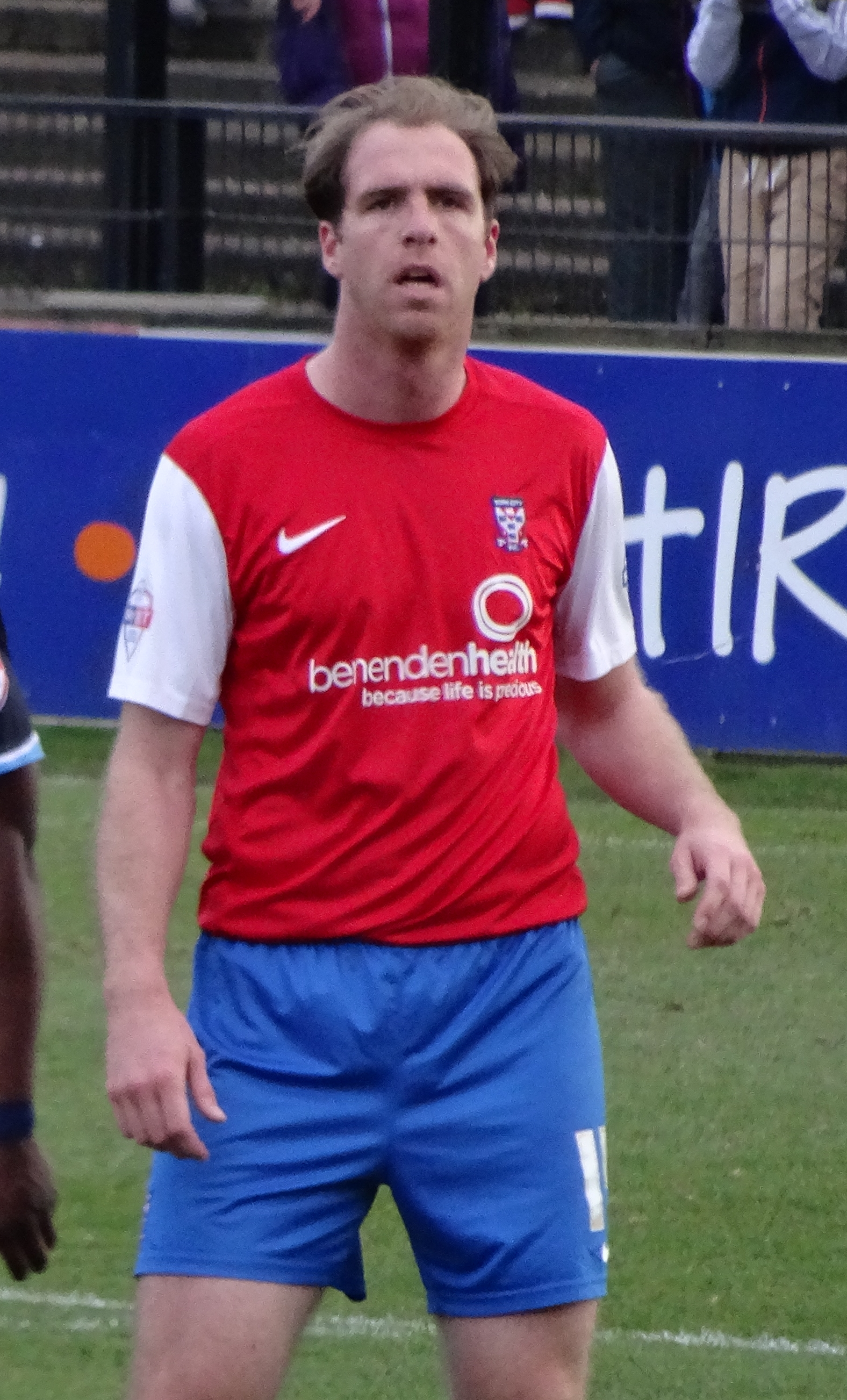
Lowe playing for York City in 2014

On 21 November 2013, Lowe joined Cheltenham's League Two rivals York City on loan until January 2014, with a view to a permanent transfer. He made his debut two days later in a 2–1 defeat away to Southend United, and made nine appearances for York before signing permanently on 7 January 2014 on a two-and-a-half-year contract for an undisclosed fee. The Press voted him 'Press Player of the Year' in 2013–14.

Lowe played in 49 of York's 50 matches in 2014–15, missing just one League Cup match. On 23 August, he scored in a 1–1 draw at Exeter City and was named in the Football League team of the week. He won a place on the team of the week for a second time after scoring a brace in a 3–1 victory at Hartlepool United on 22 November. He was once again included after scoring the only goal of the game against Accrington Stanley on Boxing Day. He was voted by York supporters as the club's Clubman of the Year for 2014–15. Having earlier been made available for loan under new manager Jackie McNamara, Lowe left York by mutual consent on 9 December 2015.

=== Return to Kidderminster Harriers ===
On 12 January 2016, Lowe rejoined Kidderminster Harriers, now bottom of the National League, until the end of 2015–16. He made his debut when starting their 1–0 home defeat to Guiseley on 23 January 2016. He scored two goals in 20 appearances as Kidderminster were relegated in 23rd place. Whilst considering whether to accept Kidderminster's new contract offer or to play higher-level football, Lowe said it was "a choice between my head and my heart", implying his heart lay at Aggborough Stadium. He decided to remain with Kidderminster in part due to his reverence for manager John Eustace, signing a new contract in June 2016, and was named as club captain. Lowe scored five goals in 51 appearances in 2016–17, helping Kidderminster to a second-place finish before they suffered defeat in the play-off semi-final to sixth-place Chorley. He was named in the 2016–17 National League North Team of the Year, alongside teammates Zaine Francis-Angol and James McQuilkin. In June 2017, Lowe was told he could leave Kidderminster on a free transfer, but remained under contract at the club.

=== Later career ===
Lowe signed a one-year contract with National League club Macclesfield Town on 29 June 2017. He played every minute of Macclesfield's 46 league matches during the 2017–18 season as the club earned promotion back to League Two as champions of the National League. He scored one goal, an important winner at Hartlepool United. Manager John Askey left the club after this success, but his replacement, Mark Yates, had coached Lowe at Cheltenham and Kidderminster, and offered him a new one-year contract. However, he featured only 17 times in the 2018–19 campaign, playing only two games after Sol Campbell took charge in December. He left Moss Rose after being released in the summer. Lowe went on to become one of six players – the others being Shamir Mullings, Elliott Durrell, Rhys Taylor, Jamie Grimes and Ryan Lloyd – to issue the club with a winding-up petition over unpaid wages.

On 25 July 2019, Lowe joined Nuneaton Borough in the Southern League Premier Division Central. He was released by the "Boro" after just two months however, on 22 September. Two days after leaving Liberty Way, he signed with National League North side Bradford (Park Avenue). He served the club as captain and saw an upturn in form under new manager Mark Bower, before he rejoined Kidderminster Harriers for a third spell on 4 January 2020. He scored one goal in nine appearances for the Harriers in the 2019–20 season, which was permanently suspended on 26 March due to the COVID-19 pandemic in England, with Kidderminster in 16th-place. In May 2020, he agreed a new contract to keep him at Kidderminster. He made 16 appearances in the 2020–21 season, which was also curtailed early due to the ongoing pandemic. He made 30 appearances during the 2021–22 campaign, including playing in the play-off quarter-final defeat to Boston United. Following the conclusion of the season, Lowe announced his intention to move to playing part-time, alongside a career in teaching.

On 9 June 2022, he signed for Southern League Premier Division Central side Rushall Olympic, with manager, Liam McDonald, hailing it as a "massive signing". On 29 September 2022, Lowe moved to league rivals Hednesford Town. He played 17 games for Hednesford in the first half of the 2022–23 season, before leaving the club in February 2023 after proving unable to recovery from an injury picked up towards the end of 2022.

== Style of play ==
Lowe is renowned for his clean play. In the first 167 appearances of his career the defender received just one yellow card – given to him on 17 March 2006 whilst with Swansea. However, he picked up two further bookings in 2010–11.

== Career statistics ==
Appearances and goals by club, season and competition
Club	Season	League			FA Cup		League Cup		Other		Total	
Club	Season	Division	Apps	Goals	Apps	Goals	Apps	Goals	Apps	Goals	Apps	Goals
Wolverhampton Wanderers	2004–05	Championship	11	0	0	0	2	0	—		13	0
Wolverhampton Wanderers	2005–06	Championship	3	0	0	0	0	0	—		3	0
Wolverhampton Wanderers	2006–07	Championship	0	0	—		—		0	0	0	0
Wolverhampton Wanderers	2007–08	Championship	0	0	—		—		—		0	0
Wolverhampton Wanderers	Total		14	0	0	0	2	0	0	0	16	0
Burnley (loan)	2005–06	Championship	16	0	—		2	1	—		18	1
Queens Park Rangers (loan)	2005–06	Championship	1	0	—		—		—		1	0
Swansea City (loan)	2005–06	League One	4	0	—		—		2 (Note: Appearance(s) in Football League Trophy)	0	6	0
Brighton & Hove Albion (loan)	2006–07	League One	0	0	—		0	0	—		0	0
Cheltenham Town (loan)	2006–07	League One	16	1	0	0	1	0	1	0	18	1
Port Vale (loan)	2007–08	League One	28	3	2	0	1	0	0	0	31	3
Kidderminster Harriers	2008–09	Conference Premier	43	4	4	0	—		5 (Note: One appearance in Conference League Cup, four in FA Trophy)	0	52	4
Hereford United	2009–10	League Two	19	1	2	0	1	0	3	0	25	1
Cheltenham Town	2010–11	League Two	36	1	2	0	1	0	1	0	40	1
Cheltenham Town	2011–12	League Two	31	1	2	0	1	0	5 (Note: Three appearances in Football League Trophy, two in League Two play-offs)	0	39	1
Cheltenham Town	2012–13	League Two	31	4	2	0	1	0	3 (Note: One appearance and one goal in Football League Trophy, two appearances in League Two play-offs)	1	37	5
Cheltenham Town	2013–14	League Two	13	1	1	0	2	0	1	0	17	1
Cheltenham Town	Total		111	7	7	0	5	0	10	1	133	8
York City	2013–14	League Two	30	1	—		—		2 (Note: Appearances in League Two play-offs)	0	32	1
York City	2014–15	League Two	46	6	2	0	0	0	1	0	49	6
York City	2015–16	League Two	16	1	1	0	2	0	1	0	20	1
York City	Total		92	8	3	0	2	0	4	0	101	8
Kidderminster Harriers	2015–16	National League	20	2	—		—		—		20	2
Kidderminster Harriers	2016–17	National League North	42	4	4	0	—		5 (Note: Three appearances and one goal in FA Trophy, two appearances in National League North play-offs)	1	51	5
Kidderminster Harriers	Total		62	6	4	0	—		5	1	71	7
Macclesfield Town	2017–18	National League	46	1	2	0	—		1 (Note: Appearance(s) in FA Trophy)	0	49	1
Macclesfield Town	2018–19	League Two	13	0	0	0	1	0	3 (Note: Appearance(s) in EFL Trophy)	0	17	0
Macclesfield Town	Total		59	1	2	0	1	0	4	0	66	1
Nuneaton Borough	2019–20	Southern League; Premier Division Central	8	0	1	0	—		0	0	9	0
Bradford (Park Avenue)	2019–20	National League North	13	0	0	0	—		2	1	15	1
Kidderminster Harriers	2019–20	National League North	9	1	0	0	—		0	0	9	1
Kidderminster Harriers	2020–21	National League North	15	1	0	0	—		1	0	16	1
Kidderminster Harriers	2021–22	National League North	24	0	3	0	—		3 (Note: Two appearances in FA Trophy, one appearances in National League North play-offs)	0	30	0
Kidderminster Harriers	Total		48	2	3	0	0	0	4	0	55	2
Hednesford Town	2022–23	Southern League; Premier Division Central	13	0	0	0	—		4 (Note: Three appearances in FA Trophy, one appearance in Birmingham Senior Cup)	0	17	0
Career total			547	33	28	0	15	1	44	3	634	37

== Honours ==
Swansea City

- Football League Trophy: 2005–06

Macclesfield Town

- National League: 2017–18

Individual

- Cheltenham Town Player of the Year: 2010–11
- York City Clubman of the Year: 2014–15
- National League North Team of the Year: 2016–17
