= Danny Andrew =

English footballer (born 1990)

Personal information
- Full name: Daniel Kenny Andrew
- Date of birth: 23 December 1990 (age 35)
- Place of birth: Holbeach, England
- Height: 5 ft 11 in (1.80 m)
- Positions: Left-back; left wing-back; centre-back

Team information
- Current team: Fleetwood Town
- Number: 3

Youth career
- –2003: Peterborough United
- 2003–2005: Leicester City
- 2005–2007: Holbeach United
- 2007–2008: Peterborough United

Senior career*
| Years | Team | Apps | (Gls) |
| 2008–2010 | Peterborough United | 2 | (0) |
| 2009 | → Tamworth (loan) | 5 | (0) |
| 2009–2010 | → Kidderminster Harriers (loan) | 8 | (0) |
| 2010 | → Cheltenham Town (loan) | 10 | (0) |
| 2010–2013 | Cheltenham Town | 54 | (4) |
| 2012 | → Mansfield Town (loan) | 5 | (0) |
| 2012 | → Cambridge United (loan) | 6 | (0) |
| 2012–2013 | → Gloucester City (loan) | 8 | (1) |
| 2012–2013 | Gloucester City | 18 | (3) |
| 2013–2014 | Macclesfield Town | 46 | (5) |
| 2014–2016 | Fleetwood Town | 16 | (0) |
| 2016–2017 | Grimsby Town | 46 | (0) |
| 2017–2019 | Doncaster Rovers | 50 | (4) |
| 2019–2023 | Fleetwood Town | 149 | (11) |
| 2023–2025 | Cambridge United | 77 | (3) |
| 2025 | Stockport County | 5 | (0) |
| 2025–2026 | Exeter City | 21 | (0) |
| 2026– | Fleetwood Town | 0 | (0) |
- * Club domestic league appearances and goals as of 17:59, 17 June 2026 (UTC)

Daniel Kenny Andrew (born 23 December 1990) is an English footballer, who plays as a defender for EFL League Two club Fleetwood Town. Predominantly a left-back, Andrew can also operate at centre-back, often in a back three.

Andrew is a free kick specialist. He began his career with Peterborough United and following loan spells with Tamworth, Kidderminster Harriers and Cheltenham Town he joined the latter permanently. He has since gone on to play for Mansfield Town, Cambridge United, Gloucester City, Macclesfield Town, Grimsby Town and Doncaster Rovers.

== Club career ==
=== Peterborough United ===
Andrew developed through the youth system at Peterborough United. Injuries to Scott Griffiths and Jamie Day saw Andrew play the final two games of Peterborough's 2009–10 season. He made his debut in a 1–0 defeat at home to Blackpool. He continued at left-back for the final game of the season away to Plymouth Argyle which ended in a 2–1 win for Peterborough.

Andrew was not offered a new contract at London Road and therefore left the club.

=== Cheltenham Town ===
In June 2010 Andrew signed a two-year contract at Cheltenham Town. After his first season at Whaddon Road he was rewarded with a one-year contract extension after missing just three league games in the whole season.

On 9 March 2012, Andrew signed for Conference Premier side Mansfield Town on an emergency loan until the end of the season.

On 13 September 2012, he joined Football Conference side Cambridge United on an initial one-month loan. On 13 December 2012, Andrew joined Conference North side Gloucester City initially on a one-month loan. In January 2013, Cheltenham agreed to terminate his contract and signed for Gloucester City on a permanent basis until the end of the season.

=== Macclesfield Town ===
After a successful trial with the club, Andrew signed for Conference Premier side Macclesfield Town in July 2013 on a short-term contract. On 7 December 2013, in the second round of the FA Cup, he scored the opening goal in the 3–2 victory against Conference North side Brackley Town; Danny Whitaker fed Andrew, he surged into the box and thundered a left footed low drive from an acute angle into the bottom right corner.

He extended his contract in December 2013 at Moss Rose until the end of the 2013–14 season. On 26 December 2013, Andrew scored the second goal on 29 minutes in the 3–0 win over Hyde; a free-kick, which curled low around the wall and into the bottom left corner for his second goal in four games. Two days later he scored the decisive goal 7 minutes from time in the 3–2 away victory at Grimsby; a free-kick, which curled into the top right corner which gave the goalkeeper McKeown no chance. On 14 February 2014, Andrew scored a 38th-minute equaliser in the 2–1 home defeat to Luton Town; moving into the centre of the field, he let fly from 20 yards with a left footed shot from outside the box into the bottom right corner.

Andrew is the only player in the squad to have played in every senior game of that season.

=== Fleetwood Town ===
On 29 May 2014, Andrew joined newly promoted League One side Fleetwood Town for an undisclosed fee. He managed to break into the first team, however he suffered a knee ligament injury on boxing day 2014 in the 2–0 away defeat against Bradford. He spent the next five months on the sidelines, he made his comeback on the final day of the 2014–15 season in Fleetwood's 2–1 victory at Port Vale.

Andrew started the 2015–16 campaign as first choice left-back, but he picked up a thigh injury in the 5–1 defeat at Gillingham in September. He only featured again eight months later in Fleetwood's final 2–0 home win against Crewe.

Andrew was released at the end of the 2015–16 season.

=== Grimsby Town ===
On 8 June 2016, Andrew signed for League Two side Grimsby Town on a one-year contract. He made his debut on 6 August 2016 in the opening game of the 2016–17 season in Grimsby's 2–0 home victory against Morecambe.

=== Doncaster Rovers ===
On 1 June 2017 Andrew signed by former manager Darren Ferguson at Doncaster Rovers on a two-year deal.

=== Return to Fleetwood Town ===
He was offered a new contract by Doncaster at the end of the 2018–19 season but he instead decided to rejoin Fleetwood Town on a three-year deal. Andrew was offered a new long-term deal by the club at the end of the 2021–22 season.

=== Cambridge United ===
On 26 June 2023, Andrew returned to League One side Cambridge United on a one-year deal, eleven years on from a previous loan spell with the club.

On 8 May 2025, Cambridge announced he would be leaving in June when his contract expired.

=== Stockport County ===
On 2 August 2025, Andrew joined League One side Stockport County on a one-month contract. On 3 August 2025, Danny made his debut for Stockport County against Bolton Wanderers at Edgeley Park, coming on as substitute in the 84th minute. On the 89th minute, Danny delivered a free kick which was headed into the goal by Kyle Wootton. Stockport won the game 2-0.

He departed the club on 1 September upon the expiry of his short-term deal.

=== Exeter City ===
On the same date as his departure from Stockport County, Andrew joined fellow League One side Exeter City on a one-year deal.

Following the club's relegation, he was released upon the expiry of his contract at the end of the 2025–26 season.

=== Second return to Fleetwood Town ===
On 17 June 2026, Andrew agreed to return to League Two club Fleetwood Town for a third spell on a one-year deal.

== Career statistics ==
As of end of 2025–26 season

Appearances and goals by club, season and competition
| Club | Season | League | | | FA Cup | | League Cup | | Other | | Total | |
| Club | Season | Division | Apps | Goals | Apps | Goals | Apps | Goals | Apps | Goals | Apps | Goals |
|---|---|---|---|---|---|---|---|---|---|---|---|---|
| Peterborough United | 2008–09 | League One | 0 | 0 | 0 | 0 | 0 | 0 | 0 | 0 | 0 | 0 |
| Peterborough United | 2009–10 | Championship | 2 | 0 | 0 | 0 | 0 | 0 | — | | 2 | 0 |
| Peterborough United | Total | | 2 | 0 | 0 | 0 | 0 | 0 | 0 | 0 | 2 | 0 |
| Tamworth (loan) | 2009–10 | Conference Premier | 5 | 0 | 0 | 0 | — | | 0 | 0 | 5 | 0 |
| Kidderminster Harriers (loan) | 2009–10 | Conference Premier | 8 | 0 | 0 | 0 | — | | 0 | 0 | 8 | 0 |
| Cheltenham Town (loan) | 2009–10 | League Two | 10 | 0 | — | | — | | — | | 10 | 0 |
| Cheltenham Town | 2010–11 | League Two | 43 | 4 | 1 | 0 | 1 | 0 | 1 (Note: Appearance(s) in Football League Trophy) | 0 | 46 | 4 |
| Cheltenham Town | 2011–12 | League Two | 10 | 0 | 0 | 0 | 1 | 0 | 3 | 0 | 14 | 0 |
| Cheltenham Town | 2012–13 | League Two | 1 | 0 | 0 | 0 | 0 | 0 | 0 | 0 | 1 | 0 |
| Cheltenham Town | Total | | 64 | 4 | 1 | 0 | 2 | 0 | 4 | 0 | 71 | 4 |
| Mansfield Town (loan) | 2011–12 | Conference Premier | 5 | 0 | — | | — | | 1 (Note: Appearance in Conference Premier play-offs) | 0 | 6 | 0 |
| Cambridge United (loan) | 2012–13 | Conference Premier | 6 | 0 | — | | — | | — | | 6 | 0 |
| Gloucester City (loan) | 2012–13 | Conference North | 8 | 1 | — | | — | | — | | 8 | 1 |
| Gloucester City | 2012–13 | Conference North | 18 | 3 | — | | — | | — | | 18 | 3 |
| Macclesfield Town | 2013–14 | Conference Premier | 46 | 5 | 5 | 1 | — | | 1 (Note: Appearance in FA Trophy) | 0 | 52 | 6 |
| Fleetwood Town | 2014–15 | League One | 7 | 0 | 0 | 0 | 0 | 0 | 1 | 0 | 8 | 0 |
| Fleetwood Town | 2015–16 | League One | 9 | 0 | 0 | 0 | 1 | 0 | 0 | 0 | 10 | 0 |
| Fleetwood Town | Total | | 16 | 0 | 0 | 0 | 1 | 0 | 1 | 0 | 18 | 0 |
| Grimsby Town | 2016–17 | League Two | 46 | 0 | 1 | 0 | 1 | 0 | 2 (Note: Appearance(s) in EFL Trophy) | 0 | 50 | 0 |
| Doncaster Rovers | 2017–18 | League One | 4 | 0 | 0 | 0 | 2 | 0 | 0 | 0 | 6 | 0 |
| Doncaster Rovers | 2018–19 | League One | 46 | 4 | 6 | 0 | 2 | 1 | 2 (Note: Appearances in EFL League One play-offs) | 0 | 56 | 5 |
| Doncaster Rovers | Total | | 50 | 4 | 6 | 0 | 4 | 1 | 2 | 0 | 62 | 5 |
| Fleetwood Town | 2019–20 | League One | 35 | 2 | 3 | 0 | 1 | 0 | 6 (Note: Four appearances and two goals in EFL Trophy, two appearances and one goal in EFL League One play-offs) | 3 | 45 | 5 |
| Fleetwood Town | 2020–21 | League One | 45 | 2 | 1 | 0 | 3 | 0 | 1 | 0 | 50 | 2 |
| Fleetwood Town | 2021–22 | League One | 39 | 6 | 1 | 0 | 1 | 0 | 2 | 0 | 43 | 6 |
| Fleetwood Town | 2022–23 | League One | 30 | 1 | 6 | 0 | 2 | 0 | 1 | 0 | 39 | 1 |
| Fleetwood Town | Total | | 149 | 11 | 11 | 0 | 7 | 0 | 10 | 3 | 177 | 17 |
| Cambridge United | 2023–24 | League One | 45 | 2 | 3 | 1 | 1 | 0 | 0 | 0 | 49 | 3 |
| Cambridge United | 2024–25 | League One | 32 | 1 | 2 | 0 | 1 | 0 | 3 | 0 | 38 | 1 |
| Cambridge United | Total | | 77 | 3 | 5 | 1 | 2 | 0 | 3 | 0 | 87 | 4 |
| Stockport County | 2025–26 | League One | 5 | 0 | 0 | 0 | 2 | 0 | 0 | 0 | 7 | 0 |
| Exeter City | 2025–26 | League One | 21 | 0 | 1 | 1 | 0 | 0 | 3 | 0 | 25 | 1 |
| Career total | | | 526 | 31 | 30 | 3 | 19 | 0 | 27 | 3 | 602 | 37 |

== Honours ==
Individual

- Grimsby Town Player of the Year: 2016–17
