= Marley Watkins =

Wales international footballer (born 1990)

Personal information
- Full name: Marley Joseph Watkins
- Date of birth: 17 October 1990 (age 36)
- Place of birth: Lewisham, England
- Height: 6 ft 1 in (1.86 m)
- Position: Winger

Youth career
- 1999–2007: Swansea City

Senior career*
Years	Team	Apps	(Gls)
2008–2011	Cheltenham Town	26	(1)
2010–2011	→ Bath City (loan)	22	(3)
2011–2012	Bath City	37	(5)
2012–2013	Hereford United	34	(5)
2013–2015	Inverness Caledonian Thistle	59	(8)
2015–2017	Barnsley	76	(15)
2017–2018	Norwich City	24	(0)
2018–2021	Bristol City	27	(3)
2020	→ Aberdeen (loan)	9	(2)
2021	Cardiff City	0	(0)
2021–2023	Aberdeen	47	(4)
2023–2026	Kilmarnock	81	(19)

International career^{‡}
2017–2018	Wales	2	(0)
- * Club domestic league appearances and goals as of 20 May 2026 ‡ National team caps and goals as of 16 June 2018 (UTC)

Marley Joseph Watkins (born 17 October 1990) is a professional footballer who most recently played as a winger for Scottish Premiership club Kilmarnock. He has attained two caps for the Wales national team.

== Personal life ==
Born in Lewisham in London, Watkins grew up in Swansea in Wales. Through his parents, he qualified to play for Wales and France. He is the grandson of the writer Gwen Watkins and the Welsh poet Vernon Watkins.

== Club career ==
Watkins started his career as a youth player at Swansea City but was released and he joined Cheltenham Town in 2008. On 9 August 2008, he made his first senior appearance for the club, playing in the last ten minutes of a 4–2 defeat at Northampton Town. In doing so, he became Cheltenham Town's youngest ever league player. He scored his first professional goal after coming on as a substitute against Northampton in the 2009–10 season.

In September 2010, Watkins joined Conference National side Bath City on loan. He subsequently signed for Bath on a permanent basis in January 2011, after his successful loan spell.

At the start of the 2012–13 season, Watkins signed a one-year deal at Hereford United. Watkins enjoyed a successful start to his Hereford career by winning a 'Player of the Month' award in his first month at the club. He ultimately played 34 league games and scored five goals in his season at Hereford.

In June 2013 it was announced that Watkins would be joining Inverness Caledonian Thistle for the 2013–2014 season. He made his Scottish Premiership debut at Celtic Park on 24 August, coming on as a substitute in a 2–2 draw with Celtic. On 30 May 2015, he opened the scoring for Inverness in the Scottish Cup Final at Hampden Park, as the club secured a 2–1 victory against Falkirk. During his time at Inverness, the club reached the final of the 2013–14 Scottish League Cup and in addition to the Scottish Cup win, they finished third in the Scottish Premiership in 2014–15 and qualified for European football for the first time in their history.

On 5 June 2015, Watkins signed for League One club Barnsley. In his first season with Barnsley, the club won the Football League Trophy against Oxford United, and won promotion via the playoffs to gain promotion to the Championship. He scored eight goals and got nine assists in 42 games during his debut season with Barnsley. Additionally, Watkins scored on his Championship debut against Ipswich Town and assisted another with Barnsley losing the game, 4–2.

On 1 June 2017, Watkins signed for Championship club Norwich City on a free transfer. He joined the club on 1 July. He scored his first goal for Norwich in an EFL Cup tie against Charlton Athletic on 22 August 2017.

On 15 June 2018, after one season at Norwich City, Watkins signed for fellow Championship side Bristol City for a fee of £1 million. The move reunited him with Lee Johnson, his manager at Barnsley.

On 22 August 2020, Watkins signed for Aberdeen on loan until January 2021. He scored his first goal in a 3–0 away win over Ross County in the Scottish Premiership on 27 September, his first Scottish League goal since 31 January 2015, which, incidentally, was also against Ross County.

In late December 2020, Watkins returned to Bristol City. In March 2021, Watkins returned to action with The Robins, coming off the bench in their 3–0 away win against Birmingham City. On 14 May 2021, he was released by Bristol City following the expiry of his contract.

On 10 August 2021, Watkins joined Cardiff City. On that same day he made his debut and scored twice in a 3-2 EFL Cup win over Sutton United. However, shortly afterwards, the club confirmed Watkins would not be offered an extension beyond his initial one-month deal.

On 26 August 2021, Watkins returned for a second spell with Aberdeen, signing a two-year contract. He left in 2023 having scored 4 goals for the club.

On 21 July 2023, Watkins signed a one-year deal with Scottish Premiership club Kilmarnock, reuniting with former Aberdeen manager Derek McInnes. On 29 June 2024, Watkins signed a new two-year deal.

== International career ==
Watkins was born in England, and is of Welsh and French descent. Watkins was called up to the Wales national team on 25 May 2017, for a match against Serbia on 11 June 2017. He made his debut for the side on 14 November 2017, as a substitute during a 1–1 draw with Panama.

== Career statistics ==
As of match played 11 May 2024

Appearances and goals by club, season and competition
Club	Season	League			National cup (Note: Includes FA Cup, Scottish Cup)		League cup (Note: Includes Football League Cup, Scottish League Cup)		Other		Total	
Club	Season	Division	Apps	Goals	Apps	Goals	Apps	Goals	Apps	Goals	Apps	Goals
Cheltenham Town	2008–09	League One	12	0	1	0	0	0	0	0	13	0
Cheltenham Town	2009–10	League Two	13	1	0	0	0	0	1 (Note: Appearance in Football League Trophy)	0	14	1
Cheltenham Town	2010–11	League Two	1	0	0	0	0	0	0	0	1	0
Cheltenham Town	Total		26	1	1	0	0	0	1	0	28	1
Bath City (loan)	2010–11	Conference Premier	22	3	0	0	—		2 (Note: Appearances in FA Trophy)	0	24	3
Bath City	2011–12	Conference Premier	37	5	3	0	—		1	0	41	5
Hereford United	2012–13	Conference Premier	34	5	1	0	—		1	0	36	5
Inverness Caledonian Thistle	2013–14	Scottish Premiership	26	1	4	0	3	0	—		33	1
Inverness Caledonian Thistle	2014–15	Scottish Premiership	33	7	5	2	1	0	—		39	9
Inverness Caledonian Thistle	Total		59	8	9	2	4	0	0	0	72	10
Barnsley	2015–16	League One	34	5	1	0	2	1	5 (Note: Four appearances and two goals in Football League Trophy, one appearance in League One play-offs)	1	42	7
Barnsley	2016–17	Championship	42	10	2	0	1	0	—		45	10
Barnsley	Total		76	15	3	0	3	1	5	1	87	17
Norwich City	2017–18	Championship	24	0	0	0	3	1	—		27	1
Bristol City	2018–19	Championship	16	2	0	0	1	0	—		17	2
Bristol City	2019–20	Championship	9	1	1	0	0	0	—		10	1
Bristol City	2020–21	Championship	2	0	0	0	0	0	—		2	0
Bristol City	Total		27	3	1	0	1	0	0	0	29	3
Aberdeen (loan)	2020–21	Scottish Premiership	9	2	1 (Note: Includes one appearance in the 2019–20 Scottish Cup semi-final which was postponed until October 2020, due to COVID-19)	0	0	0	3 (Note: Appearances in UEFA Europa League)	0	13	2
Cardiff City	2021–22	Championship	0	0	0	0	1	2	—		1	2
Aberdeen	2021–22	Scottish Premiership	21	3	0	0	0	0	0	0	21	3
Aberdeen	2022–23	Scottish Premiership	26	1	1	0	4	0	—		31	1
Aberdeen	Total		47	4	1	0	4	0	0	0	52	4
Kilmarnock	2023–24	Scottish Premiership	36	9	3	2	4	2	—		43	13
Career total			397	55	23	4	20	7	13	1	453	66

== Honours ==
Inverness Caledonian Thistle

- Scottish Cup: 2014–15

Barnsley

- Football League One play-offs: 2016
- Football League Trophy: 2015–16
