= Wes Thomas =

English footballer

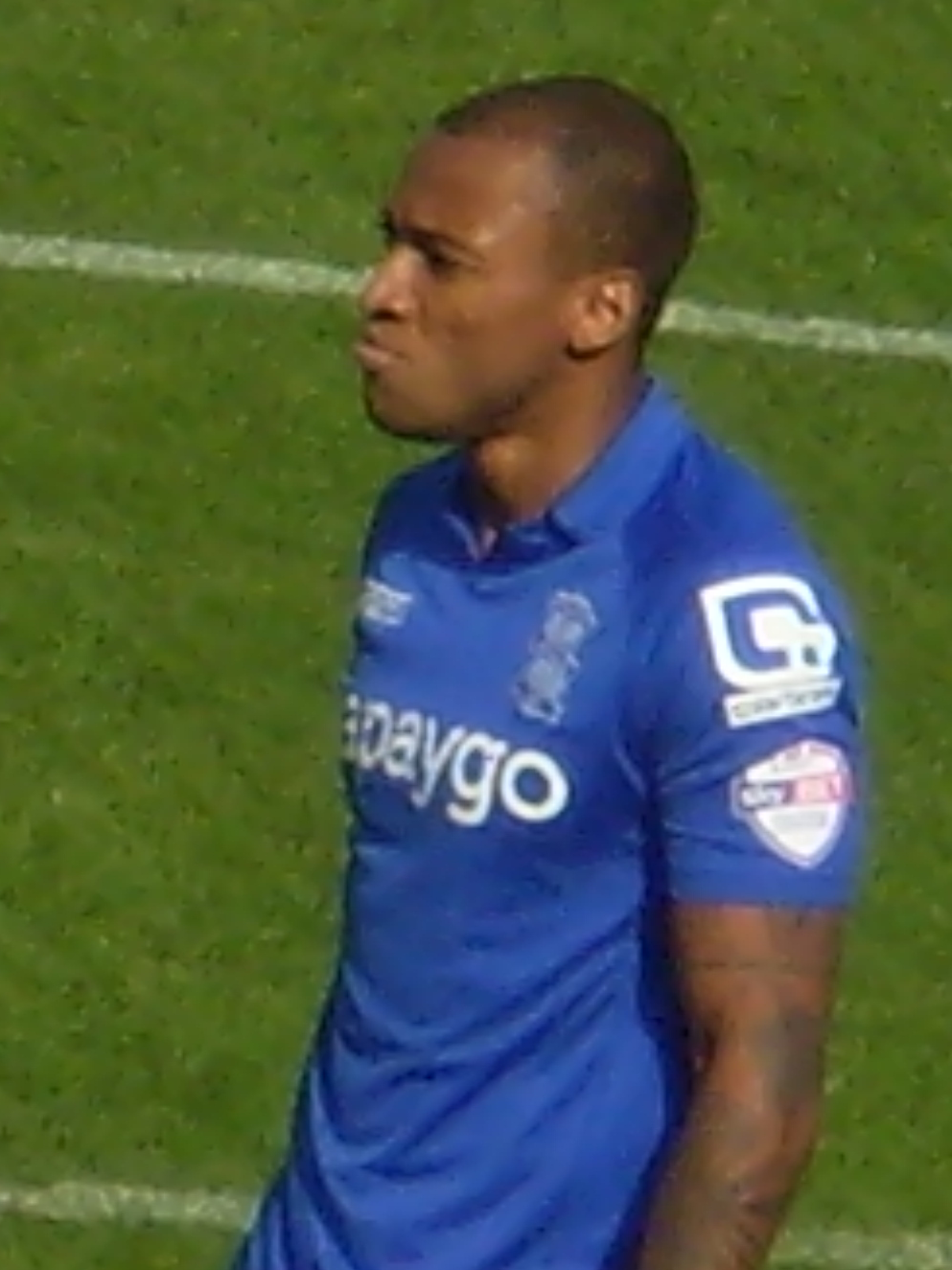
- Thomas playing for Birmingham City in August 2014

Personal information
- Full name: Wesley Alexander Nevada Thomas
- Date of birth: 23 January 1987 (age 39)
- Place of birth: Barking, London, England
- Height: 5 ft 11 in (1.80 m)
- Position: Striker

Youth career
- Queens Park Rangers
- Waltham Forest

Senior career*
Years	Team	Apps	(Gls)
2005–2006	Waltham Forest	32	(17)
2006–2007	Thurrock		
2007–2008	Fisher Athletic		
2008–2010	Dagenham & Redbridge	27	(3)
2008–2009	→ Grays Athletic (loan)	7	(2)
2010	→ Rushden & Diamonds (loan)	0	(0)
2010–2011	Cheltenham Town	41	(18)
2011–2012	Crawley Town	6	(1)
2011–2012	→ Bournemouth (loan)	14	(7)
2012–2014	Bournemouth	38	(4)
2012	→ Portsmouth (loan)	6	(3)
2012–2013	→ Blackpool (loan)	9	(3)
2013	→ Birmingham City (loan)	11	(3)
2014	Rotherham United	13	(5)
2014–2016	Birmingham City	33	(4)
2015–2016	→ Swindon Town (loan)	6	(2)
2016	→ Bradford City (loan)	10	(1)
2016–2018	Oxford United	50	(13)
2018–2019	Grimsby Town	36	(11)
2019–2021	Notts County	36	(10)
Total		375	(107)
- * Club domestic league appearances and goals as of 17:16, 25 January 2021 (UTC)

Wesley Alexander Nevada Thomas (born 23 January 1987) is an English former professional footballer who played as a striker.

He began his career in non-league football with various clubs in and around London before making his debut in the Football League for Dagenham & Redbridge in 2008. After loan spells in the Conference with Grays Athletic and Rushden & Diamonds, he spent a season with League Two club Cheltenham Town. He briefly joined Crawley Town before moving into League One with AFC Bournemouth. After one full season at Bournemouth, he went out on loan again, to Portsmouth, Blackpool and Birmingham City. He joined Rotherham United for the second half of the 2013–14 season before rejoining Birmingham, this time on a permanent basis. In 2015–16, he spent time on loan at Swindon Town and Bradford City, before joining newly promoted Oxford United after the season ended. He later had stints with Grimsby Town and Notts County.

== Career ==
Thomas began his football career at Queens Park Rangers, but was released at the end of his two-year scholarship. He moved into non-league football alongside studying for a BTEC National Certificate in Media. He was top scorer for Waltham Forest in the 2005–06 Southern League Eastern Division, top scorer for Thurrock in the Conference South the following season, and repeated the feat with Fisher Athletic, also in the Conference South, in 2007–08, before making his debut in the Football League with Dagenham & Redbridge in October 2008.

He joined Conference Premier club Grays Athletic on loan in December 2008; he made eight appearances and scored twice before his loan ended at the end of January 2009. He joined Rushden & Diamonds in March 2010 on loan until the end of the season, but never appeared for the first team, and was transfer-listed by Dagenham & Redbridge as they restructured the team following their promotion to League One.

=== Cheltenham Town ===
In July 2010, Thomas signed a one-year contract with League Two club Cheltenham Town. He scored his first goal for the club in a 1–1 draw against Gillingham on the opening day of the season, and followed up with two against Crewe Alexandra on his second appearance. The club were keen for Thomas to sign an extended contract – by January 2011 he was top scorer with 12 goals – but was reluctant to do so because his pregnant girlfriend wanted to stay close to her London home. He scored regularly until the beginning of March, but produced only one more between then and the end of the season; this still left him as the club's top scorer, with 19 goals. He chose not to re-sign for Cheltenham, instead joining Crawley Town, newly promoted to League Two, on what Cheltenham chairman Paul Baker described as "staggering" wages.

=== Crawley Town ===
Thomas signed a two-year contract with Crawley Town. Manager Steve Evans described him as "a natural goalscorer" with pace and good movement who was "still developing" as a player. He made his Crawley debut as a very late substitute on the opening day of the 2011–12 season, and scored in his second game, in a 2–0 win over Macclesfield Town, but was unable to dislodge Tyrone Barnett and Matt Tubbs from the starting eleven, and was unhappy about not playing. He later claimed that Evans had told him he would be first-choice striker.

=== Bournemouth ===
Thomas joined League One club Bournemouth on 9 September, initially on a 93-day loan, with an agreement for the move to be made permanent for a "six-figure fee" when the January 2012 transfer window opened. In his second game, Thomas won a penalty, reacted to a rebound off the crossbar to score his first goal for the club, and set up a goal for Marc Pugh in a 3–1 victory over Leyton Orient. He began to develop a partnership with Michael Symes which both parties and manager Lee Bradbury thought could become productive. The day after his move to Bournemouth was made permanent, Thomas and Symes each scored in a 2–0 defeat of Wycombe Wanderers. Despite scoring 11 league goals, Thomas finished the season with an even longer goal drought than he had at Cheltenham; this time he scored only once after January.

In the 2013–14 season, Thomas had been linked with League One side Swindon Town, but Bournemouth were reluctant to sell Thomas because they were "low on strikers at the moment." Having made only ten appearances in the first half of 2013–14 season, the club announced that he would not be offered a new contract by the club when the season ended.

==== Portsmouth (loan) ====
Thomas's barren spell at Bournemouth continued into the 2012–13 season, amid competition from Lewis Grabban and Matt Tubbs for a starting spot, and on 28 September, manager Paul Groves allowed Thomas to leave on a month's loan to fellow League One club Portsmouth. The next day, he scored a late winner against Scunthorpe United to give Portsmouth their first home league victory of the season. He and Izale McLeod performed well as a strike pairing, and helped the club to four league wins and a draw in Thomas's first five matches for the club. He was reluctant to return to his parent club if he was not going be played, and Michael Appleton wanted to keep him at Portsmouth, but newly appointed manager Eddie Howe recalled him to Bournemouth with the intention of involving him in the squad.

Thomas said he thought Groves had not given him enough backing, and hoped for a fresh start under Howe, but a few days later he told the manager he wanted to leave.

==== Blackpool (loan) ====
On 22 November, Thomas followed Michael Appleton to Championship club Blackpool, on loan until 1 January 2013. His first goal came on 1 December in a 4–1 away win at Peterborough United. Although Appleton wanted him to stay, Thomas finished his spell at Blackpool with three goals from nine games and returned to Bournemouth.

There was considerable interest in the player's services from Championship clubs including Derby County, Watford, Burnley and Appleton's latest club, Blackburn Rovers. But after three more appearances for Bournemouth, without scoring, Thomas signed for Birmingham City on loan until the end of the season.

==== Birmingham City (loan) ====
Thomas went straight into the starting eleven, partnering Marlon King, for Birmingham's 2–1 win against Nottingham Forest two days later. He played 71 minutes and missed a chance to score on debut, "plant[ing] a shot high and wide of the upright".

Thomas struggled to make an impact until scoring his first goals, against Derby County on 9 March. The Birmingham Mail's reporter described how "with his back to goal, Thomas wrestle-turned two defenders and showed great determination before smashing the ball in from a tight angle on the left" to level the scores, and a "thumping drive" in stoppage time completed a 3–1 win. Manager Lee Clark praised Thomas's hold up play and work ethic as well as his goals. Thomas himself expressed his desire to stay at Birmingham City on a permanent deal. Four weeks later, he scored his third and last goal of his loan spell, in a 1–1 draw with Millwall. Clark wanted to keep Thomas for the 2013–14 season, but questioned whether a deal was "doable" because of the transfer fee required.

=== Rotherham United ===
On 14 January 2014, Thomas signed for Rotherham United until the end of the season for an undisclosed fee. He scored 6 goals in 16 appearances as Rotherham gained promotion to the Championship, but turned down an offer to stay with the club.

=== Birmingham City return ===
Thomas signed a two-year contract with Birmingham on 11 June 2014. He made his second debut in the starting eleven for the opening-day defeat at Middlesbrough, and his powerful header against Brighton & Hove Albion on 16 August ended Birmingham's 18-game winless run at home in the league. After Gary Rowett replaced Clark as manager, his preference for selecting Clayton Donaldson as lone striker in a 4–2–3–1 formation meant Thomas's appearances came mostly from the bench. Early in the 2014–15 season, after scoring two poacher's goals as Birmingham beat Gillingham in the second round of the League Cup, he admitted he found the situation frustrating. He was released by Birmingham when his contract expired at the end of the 2015–16 season.

==== Swindon Town (loan) ====
On the 2015 summer transfer deadline day, Thomas joined League One club Swindon Town on loan until January 2016. He scored twice from four league matches in September, but then injured a hamstring and was out for several weeks. Because Swindon's first-team squad contained eight loanees – the rules allow a maximum of five in the matchday squad – he played only twice more after he returned to fitness in what remained of his loan spell.

==== Bradford City (loan) ====
Thomas signed a 93-day emergency loan deal with League One club Bradford City on 29 January 2016. He made his debut as a half-time substitute in the next day's League One match at home to Fleetwood. With the scores level in stoppage time, Thomas's shot was pushed onto the crossbar by Fleetwood's goalkeeper and Steve Davies touched home the rebound for a late winner. He played in ten matches, opening the scoring in a losing cause at home to Colchester United for his only Bradford goal, up to 19 March, but made no further appearances before the end of his loan.

=== Oxford United ===
Thomas signed a two-year contract with Oxford United, newly promoted to League One, on 25 June 2016. He scored his first goal for the club on his league debut, in a 1–1 draw with Chesterfield on the opening day of the 2016–17 season. In a game against Coventry City in November, he ruptured his Achilles tendon and missed the rest of the season. In 2017–18 he scored 11 goals (10 in the league) and was joint top-scorer with James Henry, but was released at the end of the season, having scored 15 goals for the club in 57 appearances in all competitions over his two seasons.

=== Grimsby Town ===
On 17 August 2018, Thomas signed a one-year contract with League Two club Grimsby Town.

He was released by Grimsby at the end of the 2018–19 season.

=== Notts County ===
On 12 August 2019, Thomas signed for Notts County. On 25 January 2021, Thomas left the club after his contract was mutually terminated.

== Career statistics ==
As of match played 7 November 2020

Appearances and goals by club, season and competition
Club	Season	League			FA Cup		League Cup		Other		Total	
Club	Season	Division	Apps	Goals	Apps	Goals	Apps	Goals	Apps	Goals	Apps	Goals
Dagenham & Redbridge	2008–09	League Two	5	0	0	0	0	0	0	0	5	0
Dagenham & Redbridge	2009–10	League Two	23	3	1	0	1	0	1 (Note: Appearances in Football League Trophy)	0	26	3
Dagenham & Redbridge	Total		28	3	1	0	1	0	1	0	31	3
Grays Athletic (loan)	2008–09	Conference Premier	7	2	—		—		1 (Note: Appearance in FA Trophy)	0	8	2
Rushden & Diamonds (loan)	2009–10	Conference Premier	0	0	—		—		—		0	0
Cheltenham Town	2010–11	League Two	41	18	2	1	0	0	0	0	43	19
Crawley Town	2011–12	League Two	6	1	0	0	1	0	1	0	8	1
AFC Bournemouth	2011–12	League One	36	11	2	0	—		—		38	11
AFC Bournemouth	2012–13	League One	6	0	1	0	1	0	0	0	8	0
AFC Bournemouth	2013–14	Championship	10	0	0	0	2	0	—		12	0
AFC Bournemouth	Total		52	11	3	0	3	0	0	0	58	11
Portsmouth (loan)	2012–13	League One	6	3	—		—		1	0	7	3
Blackpool (loan)	2012–13	Championship	9	3	0	0	—		—		9	3
Birmingham City (loan)	2012–13	Championship	11	3	—		—		—		11	3
Rotherham United	2013–14	League One	13	5	0	0	0	0	3 (Note: Appearances in League One Play-Offs)	1	16	6
Birmingham City	2014–15	Championship	33	4	2	2	2	0	—		37	6
Birmingham City	2015–16	Championship	0	0	0	0	2	2	—		2	2
Birmingham City	Total		33	4	2	2	4	2	—		39	8
Swindon Town (loan)	2015–16	League One	6	2	0	0	0	0	0	0	6	2
Bradford City (loan)	2015–16	League One	10	1	0	0	0	0	0	0	10	1
Oxford United	2016–17	League One	13	3	0	0	2	1	2 (Note: Appearances in EFL Trophy)	0	17	4
Oxford United	2017–18	League One	37	10	1	0	1	0	1	1	40	11
Oxford United	Total		50	13	1	0	3	1	3	1	57	15
Grimsby Town	2018–19	League Two	36	11	3	1	0	0	1	0	40	12
Notts County	2019–20	National League	32	10	3	0	—		3 (Note: Appearances in FA Trophy and National League Play-Offs)	0	38	10
Notts County	2020–21	National League	4	0	0	0	—		0	0	4	0
Career total			344	90	15	4	12	3	14	2	385	99

== Honours ==
Rotherham United

- Football League One play-offs: 2014
