= Jack Durrant =

English footballer

Personal information
- Full name: Jack William Durrant
- Date of birth: 6 May 1991 (age 35)
- Place of birth: Bristol, England
- Position: Defender

Team information
- Current team: Bristol Manor Farm

Youth career
- ?–2008: Cheltenham Town

Senior career*
Years	Team	Apps	(Gls)
2008–2010	Cheltenham Town	4	(0)
2008	→ Mangotsfield United (loan)	?	(?)
2010–2011	Bridgwater Town		
2011	Didcot Town		
2011	Bitton		
2011	Bishop Sutton		
- * Club domestic league appearances and goals as of 11:36, 3 August 2011 (UTC)

Jack William Durrant (born 6 May 1991) is an English footballer, who plays as a defender.

== Career ==
Durrant started his career as a youth player in Cheltenham Town's under-16 team, before signing a scholarship in 2007 with the club. In November 2008, he was loaned out to Southern Football League Premier Division team Mangotsfield United for one-month. He made his first team debut in the FA Cup third round replay away against Doncaster Rovers, on 20 January 2009. Durrant replaced Dave Bird as a substitute in the 77th minute in the 3–0 defeat. He made his Football League debut in a League One match against Leicester City in the 4–0 away defeat on 7 March, replacing Josh Low as a substitute in the 72nd minute. He was released by the club along with seven other players in May 2010.

On 2 August 2011, he signed on to Southern Football League Division One South & West club Didcot Town from Bridgwater Town, before moving on to Bitton and then to Bishop Sutton.
