= Scott Brown (footballer, born April 1985) =

English footballer (born 1985)

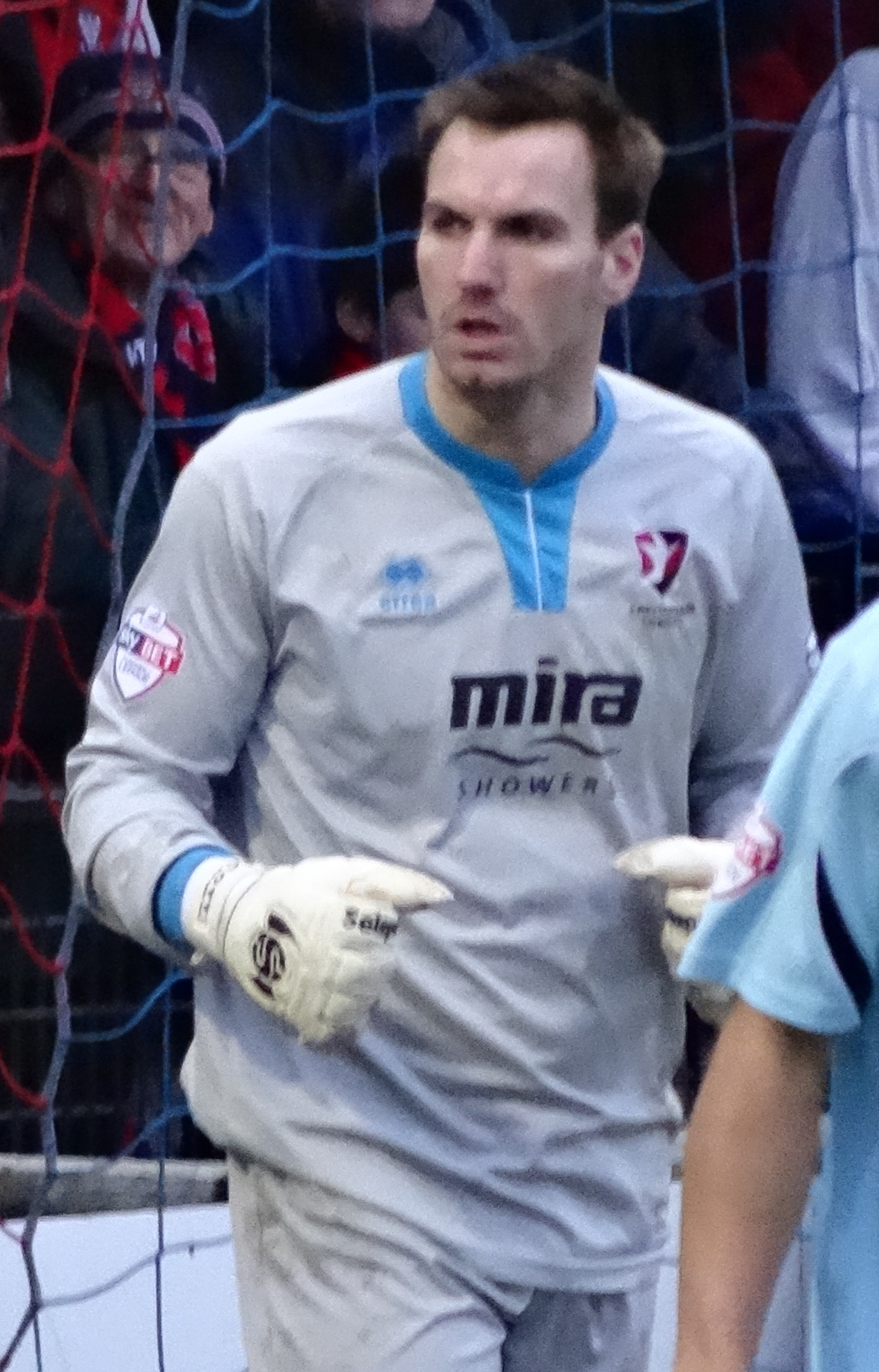
- Brown playing for Cheltenham Town in 2014

Personal information
- Full name: Scott Peter Andrew Brown
- Date of birth: 26 April 1985 (age 41)
- Place of birth: Wolverhampton, England
- Height: 6 ft 0 in (1.84 m)
- Position: Goalkeeper

Youth career
- 199?–1996: Birmingham City
- 1997–2003: Wolverhampton Wanderers

Senior career*
Years	Team	Apps	(Gls)
2003–2004	Welshpool Town		
2004–2005	Bristol City	0	(0)
2005–2014	Cheltenham Town	249	(0)
2014–2016	Aberdeen	38	(0)
2016–2018	Wycombe Wanderers	49	(0)
2016	→ Eastleigh (loan)	3	(0)
2017	→ Cheltenham Town (loan)	21	(0)
2018–2021	Port Vale	129	(0)
2021–2022	Exeter City	2	(0)
Total		489	(0)

Managerial career
- 2023: Rotherham United (co-caretaker)
- * Club domestic league appearances and goals

Scott Peter Andrew Brown (born 26 April 1985) is an English former football player who played as a goalkeeper.

Brown spent the early part of his career with Wolverhampton Wanderers, Welshpool Town and Bristol City before making his debut in the English Football League with Cheltenham Town in January 2006. He established himself as the club's first-choice goalkeeper by the 2008–09 season and stayed with Cheltenham until May 2014, playing a total of 282 games for the club, including an appearance at Wembley Stadium in the 2012 League Two play-off final, which ended in a 2–0 defeat to Crewe Alexandra. He was voted Cheltenham Town's Player of the Year for the 2012–13 season. He signed with Aberdeen in May 2014 and helped the club to finish as runners-up in the Scottish Premiership in both the 2014–15 and 2015–16 campaigns. He joined Wycombe Wanderers in July 2016 but initially failed to win a first-team place and instead spent time on loan at Eastleigh and Cheltenham Town. He was then an ever-present as Wycombe won promotion out of EFL League Two at the end of the 2017–18 season. He signed with Port Vale in May 2018 and went on to win the club's Player of the Year award for the 2018–19 season. He spent three seasons at Port Vale without missing a league game and then joined Exeter City as a player-coach in June 2021. He joined the backroom staff at Rotherham United the following year and became co-caretaker manager in November 2023.

== Early and personal life ==
Brown was born and raised in Wolverhampton; his mother, Liz, was a former England squash player and his father was a professional tennis coach. He has a brother, Ashley, and a sister, Liz. His father, Pete, died on 18 May 2014 following a battle with Parkinson's disease. Brown visits his father's grave every week. Brown's son, Max, was born on 23 May 2014, five days after Pete's death.

== Playing career ==
=== Early career ===
Brown was playing for Bilbrook Juniors when he was scouted by Birmingham City, but left Birmingham City when they closed their Academy in 1996. A Wolverhampton Wanderers supporter, he was with the club's youth academy between the ages of 12 and 18, but never played a first-team game for Wolves before manager Dave Jones allowed him to leave on a free transfer to Welsh Premier League side Welshpool Town in summer 2003. Wolves had strong young goalkeeping talent on the books in the form of Carl Ikeme and Wayne Hennessey. During his time in Welshpool Brown worked at Ron Flowers Sports. After being recommended by former Wolves Academy goalkeeper coach Mike Stowell, he went on to have six months with Bristol City without making a first-team appearance.

=== Cheltenham Town ===
Brown joined Cheltenham Town after being signed by management team John Ward and Keith Downing, who had been on the coaching staff at Molineux. He made his senior debut on 7 January 2006, in a 2–2 draw with Chester City at Whaddon Road in the third round of the FA Cup. He made his debut in League Two three days later in a 1–1 draw at Barnet. He did not feature in the rest of the 2005–06 campaign and was an unused substitute in the play-off final as Cheltenham secured a place in League One with a 1–0 victory over Grimsby Town at the Millennium Stadium. He initially served as understudy to Shane Higgs, filling in for 11 games as Higgs picked up some injuries in the 2006–07 season, his assured performances helping the "Robins" to avoid relegation out of League One. He did not feature in the 2007–08 season but still was signed to a new two-year contract.

He was transfer-listed by new manager Martin Allen in October 2008, but was promoted to first-choice goalkeeper the following month after Higgs moved away on loan. He made 40 appearances across the 2008–09 season but could not prevent the club from suffering relegation back into League Two. He was given the number 1 shirt for the 2009–10 season following the departure of Higgs, and made 44 appearances as Cheltenham finished just one place and four points above relegation into non-League. He played all 50 games of the 2010–11 season, helping the club to improve to a 17th-place finish despite a heavy 8–1 defeat at Crewe Alexandra later in the campaign. However, he found appearances in the 2011–12 season more difficult to come by after the loan signing of future England international, Jack Butland. Brown returned to the starting eleven after Butland was recalled by Birmingham on 16 April. Cheltenham secured a play-off place with a sixth-place finish and Brown went on to play in the play-off final at Wembley Stadium, where a 2–0 defeat to Crewe Alexandra saw Town remain in League Two.

Brown was voted Cheltenham's Player of the Year for the 2012–13 season by the club's supporters, whilst the playing squad also voted him Players' Player of the Season. He was also twice named on the League Two Team of the Week, for keeping clean sheets against York City and Barnet. He was an ever-present in league and cup competitions across the 54 game campaign as Cheltenham again secured a play-off place, this time losing out 2–0 on aggregate to Northampton Town at the semi-final stage. He played 49 of the club's 50 games of the 2013–14 season as Cheltenham dropped to 17th-position. In April 2014, he publicly criticised two unnamed players after a defeat against Rochdale, who admitted to the manager Mark Yates in training, that they had not been trying. He was offered a new contract at the end of the 2013–14 season but decided to find a new club away from the area after the death of his father.

=== Aberdeen ===
On 28 May 2014, Brown signed with Scottish Premiership club Aberdeen, stating that "I couldn't turn the opportunity down to be involved at a club like Aberdeen and to work with [manager] Derek McInnes and [goalkeeping coach] Jim Leighton on a full-time basis". He made his club debut in a 4–0 win over Livingston at Pittodrie Stadium in a Scottish League Cup tie on 23 September. He also kept a clean sheet on his first league appearance on 24 October, as Aberdeen recorded a 1–0 victory over Motherwell. His instatement as first-choice goalkeeper coincided with an excellent run of form for Aberdeen; his eight clean-sheets in a row was part of a winning run that took them to the top of the table in January. However, lapses in important defeats in the League Cup semi-final and in a top-of-the-table match against Celtic, which effectively ended Aberdeen's trophy chances, led to Jamie Langfield taking over in goal. Brown took the starting place back for the final eight matches of the 2014–15 season as Aberdeen comfortably achieved UEFA Europa League qualification with a second-place finish.

Brown did not feature in the first half of the 2015–16 season due to the form of Liverpool loanee Danny Ward, and instead had to wait until Ward returned to Anfield in January before he could make the first of his 13 appearances that campaign. Despite being preferred to loanee Adam Collin in the second half of the season, he was released in May 2016. He was named as the club's Community Supporter of the Year after putting himself forward as AFC Community Trust Player Ambassador and giving up his free time to support dementia-related charity causes.

=== Wycombe Wanderers ===
On 26 July 2016, Brown signed a two-year deal with League Two side Wycombe Wanderers after impressing manager Gareth Ainsworth on a trial basis. However, he picked up an injury on the opening day of the 2016–17 season. He was unable to dislodge Chelsea loanee Jamal Blackman from the starting eleven after returning to fitness. On 21 November, he joined National League side Eastleigh on a short-term loan. He spent a month at Ten Acres as manager Ronnie Moore needed cover for regular custodian Ryan Clarke, who had injured his elbow. Back at Wycombe he covered two games for the injured Blackman in December, who was returned to the starting eleven upon his recovery.

On 9 January 2017, Brown re-joined his former club, Cheltenham Town, on loan until the end of the 2016–17 season, with the club now lying in the League Two relegation zone. He won a place on the EFL Team of the Week for his "outstanding" performance in a 0–0 draw at Crewe Alexandra on 28 January. He featured 21 times as Town posted a 21st-place finish, avoiding relegation out of the English Football League by two places and four points; during his time there he managed to go on a run of four consecutive clean sheets, which included a penalty save and man of the match performance against Leyton Orient. He came close to signing with Cheltenham permanently but the deal fell through after manager Gary Johnson refused to pay the nominal fee of £5,000.

With Blackman back at Chelsea, Brown established himself as Wycombe's number one and was an ever-present during the 2017–18 campaign as they secured promotion out of League Two in third-place. His departure from Adams Park was announced in May 2018 after he chose to leave the club in search of a move closer to his family in Wolverhampton.

=== Port Vale ===
On 14 May 2018, Brown signed a two-year contract with League Two side Port Vale, a club recommended to him by Gareth Ainsworth. Manager Neil Aspin stated that Brown's experience would help with organising the Vale's young defenders on the pitch. He started the 2018–19 season in good form, which he credited to his settled home life and the goalkeeping coaching of Ronnie Sinclair. Speaking in January though he said that the state of the Vale Park pitch was "unacceptable for a professional football club in League Two". On 9 March, he saved a first-half penalty from Mansfield Town's Nicky Ajose to inspire a 2–1 win, in what was John Askey's first victory as "Valiants" boss. He went on to save a Kieran Agard penalty at Milton Keynes Dons on 20 April – his fifth penalty save of the campaign – and then saved the striker's shot from the rebound to help secure a 1–1 draw. He won all four of the club's Player of the Year awards for the 2018–19 season after keeping a total of 16 clean sheets in a struggling team and signed a one-year contract extension in May.

He was named on the EFL Team of the Week after keeping a clean sheet in a 1–0 win over local rivals Crewe Alexandra at Gresty Road on 2 November. The following month local newspaper The Sentinel named him as Port Vale's best goalkeeper of the 2010s following a public vote; he finished with 44% of the votes, ahead of Chris Neal (30%) and Jak Alnwick (26%). He made 45 appearances during the 2019–20 season, with Jonny Maddison standing in for just one EFL Trophy game.

He was named on the League Two Team of the Week after keeping a clean sheet in a 1–0 win over Salford City on 17 October 2020. In March 2021, he publicly criticised the club's recruitment policy, saying that it was "nowhere near good enough". In the club's next game he would make an "awful mistake" to concede the opening goal as Vale were beaten 3–2 at Cheltenham Town, and would also make it onto the scoresheet with an own goal. Brown was named as Community Champion at the club's end of season awards. However, he was not retained by new manager Darrell Clarke after his contract expired despite not missing a league game in his three seasons at the club. Brown said his release was a "massive shock" but that he "absolutely loved" his time at the club.

=== Exeter City ===
On 9 June 2021, Brown agreed a two-year deal to join Exeter City as a player-coach, becoming Matt Taylor's second signing of the summer. He sat on the bench as cover for Cameron Dawson in the first half of the 2021–22 season, though stated he did not want to block the progress of the club's young goalkeepers. He played one game in the 2021–22 season and was an unused substitute on the final day of the campaign as a 1–0 defeat to former club Port Vale at St James Park cost Exeter the league title.

== Coaching career ==
Upon joining Exeter City in June 2021, he took up the vacant role of goalkeeping coach alongside his playing role. He followed Matt Taylor to join the backroom staff at Rotherham United in November 2022. Taylor was sacked on 13 November 2023, with the club 22nd in the Championship, and Brown was put in co-caretaker charge alongside Wayne Carlisle and Dan Green. Leam Richardson was appointed as the club's new manager on 11 December. Brown stayed on as part of Richardson's backroom staff.

On 1 July 2024, Brown was appointed head of goalkeeping at League One club Bristol Rovers, once again working with Matt Taylor. He departed the club in February 2025.

== Career statistics ==
Appearances and goals by club, season and competition
Club	Season	League			National cup (Note: Includes FA Cup, Scottish Cup)		League cup (Note: Includes Football League Cup, Scottish League Cup)		Other		Total	
Club	Season	Division	Apps	Goals	Apps	Goals	Apps	Goals	Apps	Goals	Apps	Goals
Cheltenham Town	2005–06	League Two	1	0	1	0	0	0	0	0	2	0
Cheltenham Town	2006–07	League One	11	0	0	0	0	0	0	0	11	0
Cheltenham Town	2007–08	League One	0	0	0	0	0	0	0	0	0	0
Cheltenham Town	2008–09	League One	35	0	4	0	0	0	1 (Note: Appearances in the Football League Trophy / EFL Trophy)	0	40	0
Cheltenham Town	2009–10	League Two	41	0	1	0	1	0	1	0	44	0
Cheltenham Town	2010–11	League Two	46	0	2	0	1	0	1	0	50	0
Cheltenham Town	2011–12	League Two	22	0	3	0	1	0	6 (Note: Three appearances in the Football League Trophy and three in the League Two play-offs)	0	32	0
Cheltenham Town	2012–13	League Two	46	0	4	0	1	0	3 (Note: One appearance in the Football League Trophy and two in the League Two play-offs)	0	54	0
Cheltenham Town	2013–14	League Two	45	0	1	0	2	0	1	0	49	0
Cheltenham Town	Total		247	0	16	0	6	0	13	0	282	0
Aberdeen	2014–15	Scottish Premiership	25	0	1	0	3	0	0	0	29	0
Aberdeen	2015–16	Scottish Premiership	13	0	0	0	0	0	0	0	13	0
Aberdeen	Total		38	0	1	0	3	0	0	0	42	0
Wycombe Wanderers	2016–17	League Two	3	0	0	0	0	0	1	0	4	0
Wycombe Wanderers	2017–18	League Two	46	0	3	0	1	0	1	0	51	0
Wycombe Wanderers	Total		49	0	3	0	1	0	2	0	55	0
Eastleigh (loan)	2016–17	National League	3	0	0	0	—		1 (Note: Appearance in the FA Trophy)	0	4	0
Cheltenham Town (loan)	2016–17	League Two	21	0	—		—		—		21	0
Port Vale	2018–19	League Two	46	0	1	0	1	0	3	0	51	0
Port Vale	2019–20	League Two	37	0	3	0	1	0	4	0	45	0
Port Vale	2020–21	League Two	46	0	1	0	1	0	0	0	48	0
Port Vale	Total		129	0	5	0	3	0	7	0	144	0
Exeter City	2021–22	League Two	1	0	0	0	0	0	0	0	1	0
Exeter City	2022–23	League One	1	0	0	0	2	0	1	0	4	0
Exeter City	Total		2	0	0	0	2	0	1	0	5	0
Career total			489	0	25	0	15	0	24	0	553	0

== Honours ==
Cheltenham Town

- Football League Two play-offs: 2006

Wycombe Wanderers

- EFL League Two third-place promotion: 2017–18

Individual

- Cheltenham Town Player of the Year: 2012–13
- Port Vale Player of the Year: 2018–19
