= Shane Duff =

English-born Northern Irish footballer

Personal information
- Full name: Shane Joseph Duff
- Date of birth: 2 April 1982 (age 44)
- Place of birth: Wroughton, England
- Position: Defender

Youth career
- 1999–2000: Cheltenham Town

Senior career*
Years	Team	Apps	(Gls)
2000–2010	Cheltenham Town	193	(2)
2001–2002	→ Evesham United (loan)		
2010–2011	Bradford City	14	(1)
Total		207	(3)

International career
2003	Northern Ireland U21	1	(0)
- * Club domestic league appearances and goals

Shane Joseph Duff (born 2 April 1982) is an English-born former Northern Irish footballer, who last played for Bradford City. He was forced to retire from the professional game on 26 January 2012 due to injury. Known as an uncompromising centre back, he was at Cheltenham Town F.C. for 10 years until 2010. He is also a principal member of Jaguar Sports Coaching.

His elder brother, Michael Duff played for Premier League side Burnley.

== Profile ==
Duff is a tall, strong central defender who was invited to join Cheltenham Town by Mike Davis, youth team manager straight from school and spent a year in the youth team before being offered a professional contract in 2000.

After a couple of years in the reserves and a loan spell at non-league Evesham United, Duff was ready to make to the move into first team football.

He made his debut under manager Graham Allner in the 2002–03 season against Crewe Alexandra in a 4–0 defeat and the following season made a number of appearances alongside his brother Michael in central defence before Michael moved to Burnley.

Duff was selected for the Northern Ireland under-21 squad for the away match in Armenia in March 2003 and made his international debut at under-21 level three months later against Spain in Lurgan.

On the last day of the 2003–04 season he scored his first goal to equalise against Huddersfield Town, which later prevented Huddersfield achieving automatic promotion.

Duff's performances during season 2004–05 earned him the club's Player of the Year award and established him as a first choice player. He went on to play an important part as the Robins won promotion in 2006 via a play off final victory over Grimsby Town at the Millennium Stadium and retained their League One status the following season.

During both the 2006–07 and 2007–08 League One campaigns Duff's appearances were curtailed slightly by injury but he still managed to start nearly two-thirds of the over the course of both seasons.

It was a frustrating campaign for Duff during 2008–09 when injury saw him unavailable for four and a half months during the middle part of the season. Nevertheless, he returned with gusto towards the end of that campaign becoming a facet within a side that, despite suffering relegation, showed spirit and determination.

=== Bradford City ===
On 2 July 2010 Duff signed a contract with Bradford City, with an option of keeping the 28-year-old for a further 12 months. Duff has also captained Bradford City as Simon Ramsden was injured, and vice captain Zesh Rehman was a substitute. However Duff was substituted during the second half of the game and was replaced by the vice captain.

=== Retirement ===
Duff left Bradford City at the end of the 2010–11 season and in January 2012 announced his retirement at the age of 29 because of a spinal problem. In September 2011, Duff began studying for a degree at Hartpury College. In the summer of 2012 he became the under 18's coach at Bishops Cleeve.

== Career statistics ==
Club	Season	Division	League		FA Cup		League Cup		Other		Total	
Club	Season	Division	Apps	Goals	Apps	Goals	Apps	Goals	Apps	Goals	Apps	Goals
Cheltenham Town	2000–01	Division Three	0	0	0	0	0	0	0	0	0	0
Cheltenham Town	2001–02	Division Three	0	0	0	0	0	0	0	0	0	0
Cheltenham Town	2002–03	Division Two	18	0	0	0	0	0	0	0	18	0
Cheltenham Town	2003–04	Division Three	15	1	1	0	0	0	1 (Note: Appearance(s) in Football League Trophy)	0	17	1
Cheltenham Town	2004–05	League Two	45	1	1	0	1	0	2	0	49	1
Cheltenham Town	2005–06	League Two	20	0	3	0	1	0	6 (Note: 3 appearance(s) in Football League Trophy) (Note: 3 appearance(s) in League Two play-offs)	0	30	1
Cheltenham Town	2006–07	League One	34	0	2	0	0	0	1	0	37	0
Cheltenham Town	2007–08	League One	30	0	2	0	1	0	1	0	34	0
Cheltenham Town	2008–09	League One	20	0	1	0	2	0	0	0	23	0
Cheltenham Town	2009–10	League Two	11	0	0	0	1	0	0	0	12	0
Cheltenham Town	Total		193	2	10	0	6	0	11	0	220	2
Bradford City	2010–11	League Two	14	1	0	0	1	0	0	0	15	1
Career total			207	3	10	0	7	0	11	0	235	3

== Personal life ==
Also a talented cricketer, Duff appeared as a wicketkeeper-batsman for Shipton-under-Wychwood in the 2002 National Village Knockout final at Lord's.

== Honours ==
Cheltenham Town

- Football League Two play-offs: 2006
