= Will Puddy =

English footballer

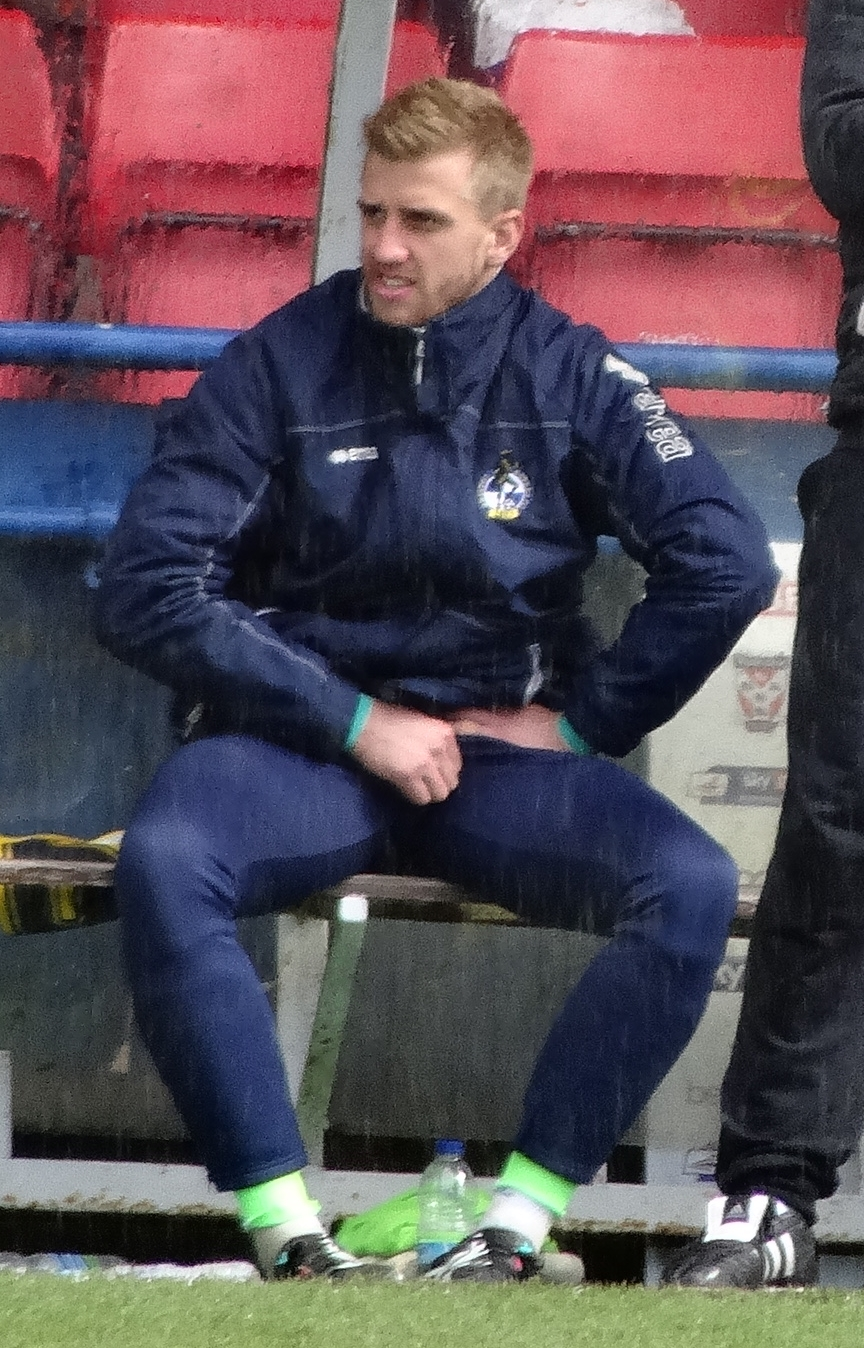
- Puddy training with Bristol Rovers in 2016

Personal information
- Full name: Willem John Stanley Puddy
- Date of birth: 4 October 1987 (age 39)
- Place of birth: Warminster, England
- Height: 6 ft 0 in (1.83 m)
- Position: Goalkeeper

Youth career
- –2004: Bristol City

Senior career*
Years	Team	Apps	(Gls)
2004–2005	Bath City	10	(0)
2005–2010	Cheltenham Town	1	(0)
2006	→ Mangotsfield United (loan)	9	(0)
2007	→ Yate Town (loan)	7	(0)
2007	→ Stafford Rangers (loan)	1	(0)
2008	→ Tamworth (loan)	11	(0)
2009	→ Bath City (loan)	4	(0)
2009	→ Oxford City (loan)		
2010	Salisbury City	1	(0)
2010–2011	Swindon Supermarine	13	(0)
2011–2012	Chippenham Town	24	(0)
2012–2014	Salisbury City	85	(0)
2014–2017	Bristol Rovers	23	(0)
2016	→ Braintree Town (loan)	4	(0)
2017	→ Sutton United (loan)	15	(0)
2018	Hereford	0	(0)
2018–2021	Chippenham Town	64	(0)
Total		272	(0)
- * Club domestic league appearances and goals as of (UTC)

Willem John Stanley Puddy (born 4 October 1987) is an English former professional footballer who played as a goalkeeper.

== Career ==
=== Youth career ===
Born in Warminster, Puddy began his career as a youth player with Bristol City, spending seven years with the side before being released.

=== Cheltenham Town ===
In 2006, he joined Cheltenham Town, spending time on loan at Mangotsfield United, Yate Town, Stafford Rangers and Tamworth to gain experience, before being handed his professional debut for Cheltenham on 2 May 2009 in a 2–0 defeat to Southend United.

At the start of the 2009–10 season, Puddy joined Conference South side Bath City on a three-month loan deal, making four appearances before returning to Cheltenham after sustaining an injury.

He was released by the club along with 7 other players in May 2010, and began training with Wolverhampton Wanderers as he recovered from an ankle operation.

=== Salisbury City ===
On 25 October 2010, he played a game on his return from his ankle operation Salisbury City. Start in the Red Insure Cup against Wimborne Town.

On 5 November 2010, he joined Swindon Supermarine to be able to play in the 2nd round F.A. Cup game against Colchester United.

=== Chippenham Town ===
On 13 August 2011, Will joined Chippenham Town. He made his first appearance for the club later that day in a Southern Football League Premier Division game against Stourbridge. He left in January 2012 to play for Salisbury City.

=== Salisbury City ===
After leaving Chippenham, he returned to Salisbury City. He spent the rest of the 2011–12 season with The Whites, only losing one game in a Salisbury City Shirt helping secure a strong finish to the season.

He then committed to the club again signing for the 2012–13 season during the pre–season period. Will went on to play over 40 games in the 2012–13 season ending in The Whites winning promotion by the way of the playoffs.

During the pre–season period before the 2013–14 season, Mikey Harris signed Will on for the upcoming season stating that he had full faith in Will, and believed that he would continue to do well. Will played an integral role in pre-season, playing pretty much every minute. Will went on to play much of the 2013–14 season, again appearing over 40 times in the league with 14 clean sheets, ending in being awarded the player's player of the season award by his fellow professionals.

=== Bristol Rovers ===
On 11 August 2014, he joined Bristol Rovers on non-contract terms. He started for Bristol Rovers in the 2015 Conference Premier play-off final against Grimsby Town on 17 May 2015, and was substituted for Steve Mildenhall during the stoppage time of extra with the score at 1–1. Rovers went on to win the penalty shoot-out 5–3. Puddy made his return to the Bristol Rovers team in the EFL Trophy 1–0 defeat to Portsmouth. Puddy proceeded to play in the league on 10 December 2016 in a 4–2 victory over Bury.

=== Braintree Town ===
On 23 September 2016, Puddy joined Braintree Town on a one-month loan deal from Bristol Rovers. Puddy made his debut for the club in a 1–0 defeat to Forest Green Rovers. Puddy injured himself in the FA Cup 4th qualifying round 4–2 victory over Bromley.

=== Sutton United ===
On 27 February 2017, Puddy joined Sutton United on an initial one-month loan deal as a direct replacement for injured first choice goalkeeper Ross Worner. He made his debut for the club on 28 February 2017, keeping a clean sheet during a 1–0 victory over Boreham Wood. Puddy kept a second clean sheet in his next match, a 0–0 draw with Barrow, Sutton's first away clean sheet back in the non-League top flight for 26 years since a 9–0 victory against Gateshead on 22 September 1990.

== Personal life ==
Following his retirement from professional football, Puddy joined rural accountacy firm Old Mill, being made partner in March 2025.

== Career statistics ==
As of match played 4 March 2017.

Appearances and goals by club, season and competition
Club	Season	League			FA Cup		League Cup		Other		Total	
Club	Season	Division	Apps	Goals	Apps	Goals	Apps	Goals	Apps	Goals	Apps	Goals
Cheltenham Town	2008–09	League One	1	0	0	0	0	0	0	0	1	0
Mangotsfield United (loan)	2006–07	Southern League Premier Division	9	0	0	0	—		0	0	9	0
Yate Town (loan)	2006–07	Southern League Premier Division	7	0	0	0	—		0	0	7	0
Stafford Rangers (loan)	2007–08	Conference Premier	1	0	0	0	—		0	0	1	0
Tamworth (loan)	2008–09	Conference North	11	0	0	0	—		0	0	11	0
Bath City (loan)	2009–10	Conference South	4	0	0	0	—		0	0	4	0
Salisbury City	2010–11	Southern League Premier Division	1	0	0	0	—		0	0	1	0
Swindon Supermarine	2010–11	Southern League Premier Division	13	0	1	0	—		1 (Note: Appearance(s) in FA Trophy)	0	15	0
Chippenham Town	2011–12	Southern League Premier Division	24	0	1	0	—		8 (Note: Seven appearances in FA Trophy, one in Southern League Cup)	0	33	0
Salisbury City	2011–12	Conference South	12	0	—		—		0	0	12	0
Salisbury City	2012–13	Conference South	33	0	2	0	—		5 (Note: Two appearances in FA Trophy, three in Conference South play-offs)	0	40	0
Salisbury City	2013–14	Conference Premier	40	0	3	0	—		1	0	44	0
Salisbury City	Total		85	0	5	0	—		6	0	96	0
Bristol Rovers	2014–15	Conference Premier	15	0	0	0	—		3 (Note: Appearance(s) in Conference Premier play-offs)	0	18	0
Bristol Rovers	2015–16	League Two	1	0	0	0	0	0	0	0	1	0
Bristol Rovers	2016–17	League One	7	0	—		0	0	1 (Note: Appearance(s) in EFL Trophy)	0	8	0
Bristol Rovers	Total		23	0	0	0	0	0	4	0	27	0
Braintree Town (loan)	2016–17	National League	4	0	1	0	—		0	0	5	0
Sutton United (loan)	2016–17	National League	15	0	0	0	—		0	0	15	0
Career total			198	0	8	0	0	0	19	0	218	0

== Honours ==
Salisbury City

- Conference South play-offs: 2012–13

Bristol Rovers

- Conference Premier play-offs: 2014–15
- League Two Automatic Promotion: 2015–16
