= Josh Emery =

English footballer

Personal information
- Full name: Joshua Stephen Emery
- Date of birth: 30 September 1990 (age 36)
- Place of birth: Ledbury, England
- Height: 1.68 m (5 ft 6 in)
- Position: Midfielder

Team information
- Current team: Hereford

Youth career
- 200?–2009: Cheltenham Town

Senior career*
Years	Team	Apps	(Gls)
2009–2011	Cheltenham Town	1	(0)
2009	→ Oxford City (loan)	?	(?)
2009–2010	→ Worcester City (loan)	15	(1)
2010	Cirencester Town	4	(0)
2010–2011	Worcester City		
2011	Stourport Swifts		(1)
2012–2014	Cinderford Town		
2015	Hereford	0	(0)
- * Club domestic league appearances and goals as of 16:44, 17 July 2015 (UTC)

Joshua Stephen Emery (born 30 September 1990) is an English footballer who last played for Hereford.

== Career ==
Emery started his career as a youth player at for Cheltenham Town since the age of 13. He made his first team debut in a League One match against Southend United in the 2–0 away defeat on 2 May 2009, replacing Jake Lee as a substitute in the 55th minute.

== Personal life ==
Emery was born in Ledbury, where he grew up. He represented Herefordshire Schools at both football and cricket. He is the son of former Hereford United player Steve Emery.
