= Michael Pook =

English footballer

Personal information
- Full name: Michael David Pook
- Date of birth: 22 October 1985 (age 41)
- Place of birth: Swindon, England
- Position: Midfielder

Team information
- Current team: Cirencester Town

Senior career*
Years	Team	Apps	(Gls)
2003–2009	Swindon Town	109	(3)
2009–2011	Cheltenham Town	64	(6)
2011	Brackley Town		
2011–2012	Maidenhead United	6	(0)
2012	Forest Green Rovers	7	(0)
2012–2013	Maidenhead United	37	(1)
2013–2014	Oxford City	29	(0)
2014	Hungerford Town	4	(0)
2014–2017	Chippenham Town	95	(2)
2017	North Leigh	1	(0)
2017–	Cirencester Town	2	(0)
- * Club domestic league appearances and goals as of 20:58, 9 September 2017 (UTC)

Michael David Pook (born 22 October 1985) is an English semi-professional footballer who plays for Cirencester Town. A product of the Swindon Town youth system, he has previously spent time with Maidenhead United, Forest Green Rovers, Brackley Town, Oxford City, Hungerford Town, Chippenham Town and North Leigh in non-League football, and represented Swindon and Cheltenham Town in the Football League between 2003 and 2011.

== Playing career ==
=== Swindon Town ===
Born in Swindon, Pook was originally a Swindon Town youth team player. He made his debut for the first team in October 2003, playing seventy minutes of a Football League Trophy match at Boston in October 2003 that the Town lost 2–1. Though he regularly appeared on the bench later in the season, he didn't make it onto the pitch until the following September, in somewhat different surroundings – coming on as an injury-time substitute in a League Cup match at Elland Road, Leeds.

He made his league debut in December 2004, again as a substitute, this time at Bournemouth – but was not used again until April – in the meantime, he was an integral part of the youth team that won the Youth Alliance South West Conference title. Without having started a match in the first team, manager Andy King offered him a professional contract, and he finally made his first start on 23 April – with the Town out of the promotion race, King began to experiment with youth players, and Pook was the first to benefit when he started the match against Tranmere, and went on to appear in the next two . During this period, he also helped the youths to an Alliance Cup victory – and though first team duties meant that he was only a substitute in the final at Burnley, he came on to play the majority of the second half plus extra time.

By the time the squad reported for pre-season training, Pook had signed his one-year deal, and with a small squad, manager Andy King declared that he wouldn't be scared to utilise any of the youngsters that were making up the first team squad. Pook started the season in an unusual role on the left side of midfield at Barnsley, but slotted back into the centre for the next match, where he remained until mid-November – the only player ever-present to this point of the season. During this period, King regularly praised Pook on his progress, and he bagged his first senior goal for the club, scoring with a shot from the edge of the area in a League Cup defeat against Wycombe at the County Ground.

Unfortunately, Pook soon made headlines for the wrong reasons – after missing his first game, sitting out the 1–1 draw at Port Vale on the bench, early the next morning he was arrested for drink driving after being stopped by a police patrol. Eventually banned from driving for nineteen months and fined £300, Pook was also dropped from the first team the following week, with new manager Iffy Onuora stating that he didn't feel it was right to play him, with everything going on behind the scenes. Pook returned to action in December, helping the Town to a 1–0 victory over Rotherham in a vital bottom-of-the-table clash.

After signings of Paul Smith and Andy Gurney, Pook's appearances became more limited in the second half of the season – Onuora stating that with the experienced players coming in, Pook should try to learn from them. He made just two appearances in January and February, before being put straight back into the starting line-up after the Town were defeated 7–1 at Nottingham Forest – and after making four starts in March, he signed another year's contract at the end of the month. Perhaps surprisingly, he made just one more start, in the last match of the season, by which time the Town's relegation to League Two had been confirmed.

Pook marked his 50th senior appearance for the club with a goal in Swindon's 3–0 home victory against Grimsby Town. Pook continued to play his role in Swindon's promotion season of 2006/2007, scoring an impressive strike away at Boston. Pooks slow and steady progression earned him a contract extension for the 2007/2008 season, although he has fierce competition for a place in the centre of midfield.

=== Cheltenham Town ===
In July 2009, Pook agreed to join Cheltenham Town on a one-year contract.

Though not known for his goalscoring and with only five league goals in his career up to that point, Pook scored his first hat-trick in a remarkable 6–5 win over Burton Albion on 13 March 2010. All his goals were scored from outside the penalty area with his right foot (one free-kick, one deflected shot and one volleyed winner), and all three goals were, remarkably, in the last ten minutes of the match. Cheltenham had found themselves 5–3 down with only three minutes of normal time remaining, but Pook's second and third – either side of an effort from Justin Richards – clinched an amazing victory.

On 9 May 2011 Pook was made available for a free transfer by manager Mark Yates and on 24 August 2011 he was released by the club.

Pook then joined Conference National side Forest Green Rovers on trial in September 2011. He trained with Forest Green to keep fit until the start of November when he left the club to link up with Brackley Town.

=== Brackley Town ===
In November 2011, Pook signed for Southern Premier Division side Brackley Town.

=== Maidenhead United ===
In December 2011, Pook signed for Conference South side Maidenhead United. In January 2012 Pook trialled at an unnamed League One club in an attempt to win a contract.

=== Forest Green Rovers ===
Just a few months after Pook finished training for fitness with Forest Green he signed for the Conference National club on 27 January 2012 as cover for the injured Al Bangura. Pook made his Forest Green debut the next day in a 1–2 home loss against Fleetwood Town. At the end of the season, having made 8 appearances, Pook was released by Forest Green.

=== Maidenhead United second spell ===
In July 2012, it was announced that after leaving Forest Green that Pook had signed on for a second spell with Maidenhead United. He left the club in October 2013.

=== Oxford City ===
Just a few days after leaving Maidenhead, he signed for Oxford City in October 2013.

=== Hungerford Town ===
It was announced on 31 May 2014 that Pook had joined Hungerford Town. He departed after making only one start for the club.

=== Chippenham Town ===
Michael Pook signed for Chippenham Town on 12 September 2014. He made his first appearance for the club during the 0-1 FA Cup first round qualifying victory at Sholing.

=== Cirencester Town ===
In August 2017, Pook signed for Cirencester Town.
