= Andy Gallinagh =

English footballer (born 1985)

Personal information
- Date of birth: 16 March 1985 (age 41)
- Place of birth: Sutton Coldfield, England
- Position: Defender

Team information
- Current team: Stratford Town

Youth career
- Coventry City

Senior career*
Years	Team	Apps	(Gls)
2002–2003	Stratford Town		
2003–2012	Cheltenham Town	130	(4)
2011	→ Bath City (loan)	14	(0)
2012	Bath City	18	(1)
2012–2013	Hereford United	27	(0)
2013–2016	Bath City	113	(0)
2016–2017	Worcester City	21	(0)
2017–	Stratford Town		
- * Club domestic league appearances and goals as of 04:02, 21 February 2017 (UTC)

Andrew Anthony R. Gallinagh (born 16 March 1985) is an English footballer who plays for Stratford Town. He plays as a defender or central midfielder.

== Career ==
Gallinagh spent a year in Coventry City's youth system, before leaving and signing for Stratford Town after an unsuccessful trial with Crewe Alexandra. He broke into the first team squad when he was 17. A year later, in 2003, he joined the Cheltenham Town Centre of Excellence, and signed a professional contract in 2004. He made his full debut for Cheltenham in the Robins' 5–0 win over Mansfield Town on the final day of the 2005–06 season.

In the 2007–08 season he made 25 first team appearances and won Cheltenham's 'Young Player of the Year' award. In May 2008, Gallinagh signed a new two-year contract with Cheltenham. Gallinagh has said in an interview in 2009 he supports Aston Villa

In September 2011 Gallinagh joined Bath City on a one-month emergency loan that was extended to another month on 28 October. He scored his first goal for the club in the fourth qualifying round of the FA Cup against Dover Athletic.

On 20 July 2012 Gallinagh joined Hereford United on a free transfer from Bath City after impressing in pre-season. Despite being a regular in the first team line up until the turn of the year Gallinagh was released at the end of the season after missing the majority of the final three months of the campaign through injury.

In June 2013, he re-joined Bath City permanently.

Since 2017 Gallinagh has returned to his first club, Stratford, in the Evo Stik South league.
