= Dave Bird =

English footballer

Personal information
- Full name: David Alan Bird
- Date of birth: 26 December 1984 (age 41)
- Place of birth: Gloucester, England
- Height: 5 ft 6 in (1.68 m)
- Position: Midfielder

Senior career*
| Years | Team | Apps | (Gls) |
| 2002–2012 | Cheltenham Town | 289 | (8) |
| 2011 | → Kidderminster Harriers (loan) | 4 | (0) |
| 2012 | Gloucester City | ? | (1) |
| 2012 | Cinderford Town | | |
| 2016 | Broadwell Amateurs | | |
| 2019- | Harrow Hill AFC | | |
- * Club domestic league appearances and goals as of 04:54, 25 July 2013 (UTC)

David Alan Bird (born 26 December 1984) is an English footballer who played as a central midfielder. Bird holds the record for most Football League appearances for Cheltenham Town F.C., having made 289 League appearances for the club. He has previously played for Cheltenham Town, Kidderminster Harriers and Gloucester City.

== Career ==
Born in Gloucester, Bird grew up in Cinderford attending Heywood School and playing for Cinderford Town from the age of 14. Bird was a member of the Cheltenham Town academy team and signed professionally in 2002. He made over 200 appearances for his club, his best season coming in 2007–08 where he had been a regular in the starting line-up and had scored four goals.

He holds the record for most league appearances for Cheltenham Town F.C., having made 289 League appearances for the club.

On 24 January 2012, Bird left Cheltenham Town by mutual consent. On 20 March 2012 Bird joined Conference North side Gloucester City on a short-term deal.

In July 2012, Bird was on trial with Hereford United although he eventually re-joined his boyhood club, Cinderford Town.

In April 2014, Bird was appointed player/assistant manager under John Brough.

In April 2016, Bird was playing for Gloucestershire County League team Broadwell Amateurs

== Honours ==
Cheltenham Town

- Football League Two play-offs: 2006
