= Jake Lee (footballer) =

Professional footballer (born 1991)

Personal information
- Full name: Jake Alexander Lee
- Date of birth: 18 September 1991 (age 35)
- Place of birth: Cirencester, England
- Height: 6 ft 0 in (1.83 m)
- Positions: Defender; striker

Team information
- Current team: Weston-super-Mare
- Number: 18

Youth career
- –2009: Cheltenham Town

Senior career*
Years	Team	Apps	(Gls)
2009–2011	Cheltenham Town	4	(0)
2010	→ Cirencester Town (loan)	2	(0)
2010	→ Bishop's Cleeve (loan)	4	(0)
2011	→ Thurrock (loan)	5	(1)
2011–2014	Bishop's Cleeve		
2014–2017	Shortwood United	95	(39)
2017–	Weston-super-Mare	56	(7)
- * Club domestic league appearances and goals as of 19:47, 22 May 2018 (UTC)

Jake Alexander Lee (born 18 September 1991) is an English footballer who is with National League South side Weston-super-Mare. He was formerly with Football League side Cheltenham Town.

== Career ==
Lee is a striker from Cirencester who signed for Cheltenham Town as a scholarship player at the start of the 2008–09 season.

Lee joined Cheltenham Town initially as a 16-year-old having previously played for Beeches FC in Cirencester. He scored 24 goals for the under-16 team and broke into the under-18s towards the end of that season.

Lee's progress continued during the 2008–09 campaign as he broke into the reserve team for a handful of appearances and was named as a substitute for the first team for the first time in March 2009 for the visit of Tranmere Rovers to Whaddon Road.

Lee made his first team debut for Cheltenham Town after starting in a 1–0 victory over Yeovil Town in a League One match on 13 April 2009.

Whilst at Cheltenham, Lee signed for three non-league clubs on loan in 2010–11. Firstly Cirencester Town in September 2010. Then in November 2010 Lee signed for Southern Football League side Bishop's Cleeve. In March 2011 Lee signed for Conference South side Thurrock on a one-month loan deal.

On 9 May 2011, he was released from Cheltenham after his contract expired.

In the summer of 2011 he joined Bishop's Cleeve permanently. He scored his first goal for the club in a 1–1 home draw with Tiverton Town on 5 October 2011 from the penalty spot. In February 2014, he was the subject of an approach from league rivals North Leigh. A month later, in March 2014, he was the subject of another approach from Cinderford Town but he declined the opportunity to join them.

In June 2014, he signed for Shortwood United, a move which saw him link back up with his former Bishop's Cleeve manager Alex Sykes.

On 14 January 2017, he signed for Weston-super-Mare.
