= Kyle Haynes =

English footballer

Personal information
- Full name: Kyle John Haynes
- Date of birth: 29 December 1991 (age 34)
- Place of birth: Wolverhampton, England
- Position: Defender

Team information
- Current team: Hednesford Town

Youth career
- Birmingham City

Senior career*
Years	Team	Apps	(Gls)
2009–2011	Cheltenham Town	18	(0)
2010	→ Gloucester City (loan)	2	(0)
2010–2011	→ Salisbury City (loan)	8	(0)
2011	→ Hednesford Town (loan)	0	(0)
2011–2012	Hednesford Town	46	(1)
2012–2013	Rushall Olympic		
2013–2015	Stourbridge		
2015	Worcester City	20	(0)
2015–2016	Redditch United		
2016	Halesowen Town		
2016–	Hednesford Town	0	(0)
- * Club domestic league appearances and goals as of 20 December 2016 (UTC)

Kyle John Haynes (born 29 December 1991) is an English footballer who plays for Hednesford Town. Haynes was formerly on the books at Cheltenham Town and featured in the Football League for the Robins.

== Career ==
=== Birmingham City ===
Haynes started his career as a junior at Birmingham City before his release in 2008. He had a trial with Norwich City in February 2008.

=== Cheltenham Town ===
After his release from Birmingham City Haynes joined the Cheltenham Town centre of excellence. Kyle progressed to the club's reserve team and made his debut for the club as a substitute in the game against Oldham Athletic on 24 March 2009. In doing so he became the club's youngest Football League player at the age of 17 years ,2 months and 26 days old. He then became the League Two Apprentice of the Year for that season.

In December 2010, he was loaned out to Salisbury City in order to gain first team experience. The loan was extended further in January 2011. After returning to Whaddon Road, he was loaned to Hednesford Town for a month.

At the start of the 2011–12 season, it was reported that Haynes had returned to Salisbury City on a three-month loan deal. This move fell through however and Haynes re-joined Hednesford Town on a three-month loan to play in the Northern Premier League.

=== Hednesford Town ===
In November 2011, Haynes and Cheltenham came to an agreement that would see Haynes leave the club to link up permanently with Hednesford following his loan spell at the club.
