= David Hutton (footballer, born 1989) =

English footballer

Personal information
- Full name: David Edward Hutton
- Date of birth: 4 December 1989 (age 36)
- Place of birth: Enfield, England
- Height: 1.65 m (5 ft 5 in)
- Position: Midfielder

Team information
- Current team: Hayes & Yeading United

Youth career
- 2006–2009: Tottenham Hotspur

Senior career*
Years	Team	Apps	(Gls)
2006–2009	Tottenham Hotspur	0	(0)
2009	→ Cheltenham Town (loan)	7	(1)
2009–2010	Cheltenham Town	25	(0)
2010	Kingstonian	1	(0)
2010–2011	St Albans City	10	(2)
2011	Jerez Industrial	8	(3)
2011–2013	Boreham Wood	39	(3)
2013–2014	Hemel Hempstead Town	55	(2)
2014	Dunstable Town	16	(2)
2014–2015	St Neots Town	9	(1)
2015	Biggleswade Town	13	(4)
2015	Bishops Stortford	2	(0)
2015–2017	Kings Langley	40	(16)
2017	Chesham United	10	(1)
2017–	Hayes & Yeading United	7	(1)
- * Club domestic league appearances and goals

David Edward C. Hutton (born 4 December 1989) is an English footballer who plays for Hayes & Yeading United.

== Career ==
Hutton attended Enfield Grammar School where he helped the school football team win the Middlesex Cup. He joined the Tottenham youth academy in 2006–07.

In March 2009, Hutton went on loan to Cheltenham Town and made his league debut against Leyton Orient on 4 April 2009. Hutton's first league and Cheltenham goal came on 10 April 2009 in a 1–1 draw away at Peterborough United.

On 11 May 2009, Hutton joined Cheltenham Town permanently on a one-year deal. He was released by the club along with seven other players in May 2010.

On 15 July 2010, Hutton joined Grimsby Town on trial and played in several pre-season friendlies against Boston United, then Stirling Albion but failed to impress enough to earn a contract.

After a brief spell with St Albans City he signed with Spanish side Jerez Industrial.

Hutton has also had spells at Boreham Wood, Hemel Hempstead Town and signed for Dunstable Town in the summer of 2014.

On 9 December 2014, Hutton signed for fellow Southern Premier Division side St Neots Town.

After a short spell with St Neots, Hutton joined league rivals Biggleswade Town in late January 2015.

Hutton later moved on to Bishops Stortford in 2015, before signing for Southern Football League side Kings Langley early into the 2015–2016 season.
