= 2011–12 Cheltenham Town F.C. season =

Cheltenham Town F.C.
2011–12 season
- Chairman: Paul Baker
- Manager: Mark Yates
- Football League Two: 6th
- FA Cup: Third round (eliminated by Tottenham)
- League Cup: First round (eliminated by MK Dons)
- Football League Trophy: Area quarter-final
- Top goalscorer: League: Darryl Duffy (11); Kaid Mohamed (11); All: Darryl Duffy (15)
- Highest home attendance: 5,288 vs. Bristol Rovers, 13 August 2011
- Lowest home attendance: 2,035 vs. Morecambe, 16 October 2010
- Average home league attendance: 3,015
Home colours	Away colours

This page shows the progress of Cheltenham Town in the 2011–12 football season. They played their games in the fourth tier of English football, League Two.

== League table ==
Pos	Team	Pld	W	D	L	GF	GA	GD	Pts	Promotion, qualification or relegation
4	Southend United	46	25	8	13	77	48	+29	83	Qualification for League Two play-offs (Note: Four teams play for one spot and promotion to Football League One.)
5	Torquay United	46	23	12	11	63	50	+13	81	Qualification for League Two play-offs
6	Cheltenham Town	46	23	8	15	66	50	+16	77	Qualification for League Two play-offs
7	Crewe Alexandra (O, P)	46	20	12	14	67	59	+8	72	Qualification for League Two play-offs
8	Gillingham	46	20	10	16	79	62	+17	70	

Updated to match(es) played on 5 May 2012. Source: BBC Sport
Rules for classification: 1) Points; 2) Goal difference; 3) Number of goals scored
(O) Play-off winners; (P) Promoted

== Squad statistics ==
=== Appearances and goals ===
As of 2 May 2012

No.	Pos	Nat	Player	Total		League Two		FA Cup		League Cup		JP Trophy	
No.	Pos	Nat	Player	Apps	Goals	Apps	Goals	Apps	Goals	Apps	Goals	Apps	Goals
1	GK	(England) ENG	Scott Brown	30	0	25+0	0	3+0	0	1+0	0	1+0	0
2	DF	(England) ENG	Keith Lowe	34	1	24+6	1	2+0	0	1+0	0	1+0	0
3	DF	(England) ENG	Danny Andrew	12	0	10+0	0	0+0	0	1+0	0	1+0	0
4	MF	(England) ENG	Dave Bird	1	0	0+0	0	0+0	0	0+0	0	0+1	0
5	DF	(England) ENG	Andy Gallinagh	0	0	0+0	0	0+0	0	0+0	0	0+0	0
6	DF	(England) ENG	Steve Elliott	41	2	38+0	2	2+0	0	1+0	0	0+0	0
7	MF	(England) ENG	Marlon Pack	47	4	42+0	4	3+0	0	1+0	0	1+0	0
8	MF	(Wales) WAL	Josh Low	42	3	25+13	3	3+0	0	1+0	0	0+0	0
9	FW	(Scotland) SCO	Darryl Duffy	46	11	25+16	11	2+1	0	0+1	0	0+1	0
10	FW	(England) ENG	Jeff Goulding	39	6	15+19	5	0+3	0	1+0	0	1+0	1
11	MF	(England) ENG	Brian Smikle	39	1	2+32	1	0+3	0	0+1	0	1+0	0
12	GK	(England) ENG	Jack Butland	2	0	2+0	0	0+0	0	0+0	0	0+0	0
14	FW	(England) ENG	Jimmy Spencer	44	11	27+13	10	2+0	0	1+0	0	1+0	1
15	DF	(Ireland) EIR	Alan Bennett	48	2	44+0	2	3+0	0	1+0	0	0+0	0
16	MF	(England) ENG	Russell Penn	47	2	39+4	1	3+0	1	0+1	0	0+0	0
17	FW	(England) ENG	Theo Lewis	0	0	0+0	0	0+0	0	0+0	0	0+0	0
20	FW	(England) ENG	Jermaine McGlashan	15	2	9+6	2	0+0	0	0+0	0	0+0	0
21	MF	(England) ENG	Bagasan Graham	7	0	1+5	0	0+0	0	0+0	0	0+1	0
22	DF	(Portugal) POR	Sido Jombati	39	3	32+3	3	3+0	0	0+0	0	1+0	0
23	FW	(Wales) WAL	Kaid Mohamed	50	11	39+6	11	3+0	0	1+0	0	1+0	0
24	DF	(England) ENG	Harry Hooman	3	0	0+1	0	0+1	0	0+0	0	1+0	0
25	MF	(England) ENG	Luke Summerfield	8	1	3+3	0	0+0	0	1+0	1	1+0	0
40	GK	(England) ENG	Steve Book	0	0	0+0	0	0+0	0	0+0	0	0+0	0

=== Top scorers ===
Place	Position	Nation	Number	Name	League Two	FA Cup	League Cup	JP Trophy	Total
1	FW	(Scotland)	9	Darryl Duffy	11	0	0	4	15
2	FW	(Wales)	23	Kaid Mohamed	11	0	0	0	11
2	MF	(England)	14	Jimmy Spencer	10	0	1	0	11
2	FW	(Wales)	10	Jeff Goulding	5	0	1	0	6
2	FW	(England)	25	Luke Summerfield	4	0	1	1	6
3	DF	(England)	7	Marlon Pack	4	0	0	1	5
3	MF	(Wales)	8	Josh Low	3	0	0	0	3
3	MF	(Republic of Ireland)	15	Alan Bennett	2	0	0	0	2
				Totals	50	0	3	6	59

=== Disciplinary record ===
Number	Nation	Position	Name	League Two		FA Cup		League Cup		JP Trophy		Total	
Number	Nation	Position	Name	Yellow card	Red card	Yellow card	Red card	Yellow card	Red card	Yellow card	Red card	Yellow card	Red card
7	(England)	MF	Marlon Pack	8	0	0	0	0	0	2	0	10	0
14	(England)	FW	Jimmy Spencer	7	1	0	0	0	0	0	0	7	1
16	(England)	MF	Russell Penn	6	0	0	0	0	0	0	0	6	0
25	(England)	MF	Luke Summerfield	2	0	2	0	0	0	0	0	4	0
22	(Republic of Ireland)	DF	Sido Jombati	4	1	0	0	0	0	1	0	5	0
15	(England)	DF	Alan Bennett	5	0	0	0	0	0	1	0	6	0
9	(Scotland)	FW	Darryl Duffy	2	0	1	1	0	0	0	0	1	0
			Totals	34	2	3	1	0	0	4	0	41	3

== Results ==
=== Pre-season friendlies ===
9 July 2011	Cirencester Town	1–1	Cheltenham Town	Corinium Stadium
15:00	Sheppard 75'		Goulding 23'

12 July 2011	Stourbridge	2–0	Cheltenham Town	War Memorial Athletic Ground
19:45	Craddock 15'; Drake 65'			Attendance: 328

16 July 2011	AFC Telford United	1–1	Cheltenham Town	New Bucks Head
15:00	Proudlock 90+3'		Goulding 64'	Attendance: 548

19 July 2011	Cheltenham Town	1–2	Bristol City	Abbey Business Stadium
19:45	Goulding 62' (pen.)		Maynard 8'; Elliott 24'	Attendance: 1,104

23 July 2011	Newport County	1–0	Cheltenham Town	Newport Stadium
15:00	Yakubu 58'			Attendance: 961

26 July 2011	Cheltenham Town	3–2	Walsall	Abbey Business Stadium
19:45	Spencer 10'; Mohamed 45+1'; Low 69'		Nicholls 20'; Paterson 87'	Attendance: 839

30 July 2011	Bath City	0–4	Cheltenham Town	Twerton Park
15:00			Low 40', 77'; Pack 76'; Duffy 81'	Referee: M. Pottage

2 August 2011	Cheltenham Town	2–4	Glenn Hoddle Academy	Abbey Business Stadium
19:45	Williams 5'; Lewis 8'		Thompson 28'; Fisher 57'; Forrester 72', 74'

=== League Two ===
6 August 2011 1	Gillingham	1–0	Cheltenham Town	MEMS Priestfield Stadium
15:00	Montrose 26'; Rooney (red card) 83'	Report		Attendance: 5,360; Referee: Lee Collins

13 August 2011 2	Cheltenham Town	1–0	Swindon Town	Abbey Business Stadium
15:00	Elliott 48'; Spencer (red card) 83'	Report		Attendance: 4,402; Referee: Craig Pawson

16 August 2011 3	Cheltenham Town	1–2	Morecambe	Abbey Business Stadium
19:45	Goulding 84'	Report	Fenton 61'; Ellison 90+2'	Attendance: 2,035; Referee: Jock Waugh

20 August 2011 4	Northampton Town	2–3	Cheltenham Town	Sixfields Stadium
15:00	Davies 39'; Akinfenwa 51'	Report	Duffy 12' (pen.), 68'; Low 80'	Attendance: 4,114; Referee: Mark Heywood

27 August 2011 5	Cheltenham Town	3–1	Crawley Town	Abbey Business Stadium
15:00	Mohamed 22'; Pack 31'; Goulding 39'	Report	Tubbs 51' (pen.)	Attendance: 2,609; Referee: Roger East

3 September 2011 6	Aldershot Town	1–0	Cheltenham Town	Recreation Ground
15:00	Rankine 72'			Attendance: 2,755; Referee: Gavin Ward

10 September 2011 7	Cheltenham Town	2–0	Macclesfield Town	Abbey Business Stadium
15:00	Goulding 34' (pen.); Spencer 88'	Report		Attendance: 2,268; Referee: Phillips

13 September 2011 8	Torquay United	2–2	Cheltenham Town	Plainmoor
19:45	Bodin 6'; Nicholson 71'	Report	Low 4'; Mohamed 45+1'	Attendance: 2,018; Referee: Woolmer

17 September 2011 9	AFC Wimbledon	4–1	Cheltenham Town	Kingsmeadow
15:00	Wellard 31'; Elliott 40' (o.g.); Midson 66'; Yussuff 84'		Duffy 89'	Attendance: 3,860

24 September 2011 10	Cheltenham Town	0–0	Hereford United	Abbey Business Stadium
15:00				Attendance: 3,011

1 October 2011 11	Bristol Rovers	1–3	Cheltenham Town	Memorial Stadium
15:00	Brown 65'		Mohamed 36', 48'; Summerfield 43'	Attendance: 6,108

8 October 2011 12	Cheltenham Town	2–1	Dagenham & Redbridge	Abbey Business Stadium
15:00	Bennett 40'; Spencer 49'		Jon Nurse 45+1'	Attendance: 2,814

14 October 2011 13	Burton Albion	0–2	Cheltenham Town	Pirelli Stadium
19:45			Low 46'; Spencer 64'	Attendance: 2,701

21 October 2011 14	Accrington Stanley	0–1	Cheltenham Town	Crown Ground
15:00			Goulding 44'	Attendance: 1,641

25 October 2011 15	Cheltenham Town	0–1	Crewe Alexandra	Abbey Business Stadium
19:45			Davis 54' (pen.)	Attendance: 3,089

29 October 2011 16	Cheltenham Town	2–1	Plymouth Argyle	Abbey Business Stadium
15:00	Duffy 83' (pen.), 90+3'		Elliott 26' (o.g.)	Attendance: 4,026

5 November 2011 17	Bradford City	0–1	Cheltenham Town	Valley Parade
15:00			Mohamed 8'	Attendance: 9,645

19 November 2011 18	Cheltenham Town	2–0	Port Vale	Abbey Business Stadium
15:00	Duffy 55' (pen.); Summerfield 69'			Attendance: 3,165

26 November 2011 19	Oxford United	1–3	Cheltenham Town	Kassam Stadium
15:00	Leven 82'		Jombati 8'; Spencer 56'; Mohamed 86'	Attendance: 8,037

10 December 2011 20	Cheltenham Town	3–0	Southend United	Abbey Business Stadium
15:00	Spencer 20'; Penn 52'; Pack 80'			Attendance: 4,304

16 December 2011 21	Barnet	2–2	Cheltenham Town	Underhill Stadium
19:45	McLeod 41', 50' (pen.)		Mohamed 32'; Duffy 44' (pen.)	Attendance: TBC

26 December 2011 22	Cheltenham Town	0–0	Shrewsbury	Abbey Business Stadium
15:00				Attendance: 5,004

30 December 2011 23	Cheltenham Town	1–0	Rotherham United	Abbey Business Stadium
19:45	Pack 11'; Penn (yellow card) 57'		Harrison (yellow card) 41'; Tonge (yellow card) 47'; Raynes (yellow card) 84'	Attendance: 3,582

2 January 2012 24	Port Vale	1–2	Cheltenham Town	Vale Park
15:00	Loft (yellow card) 32'; Yates (yellow card) 53'; Rigg 79'		Elliott (yellow card) 60'; Bennett 63'; Smikle 74'	Attendance: 4,696

14 January 2012 25	Cheltenham Town	2–0	Aldershot Town	Abbey Business Stadium
15:00	Summerfield 10'; Kaid Mohamed 90' (yellow card) 90+1'		Vincenti (yellow card) 77'	Attendance: 3,147

21 January 2012 26	Cheltenham Town	0–2	Bristol Rovers	Abbey Business Stadium
15:00	Spencer (yellow card) 83'		Zebroski 60'; Richards 63'; Poke (yellow card) 77'	Attendance: 5,288

28 January 2012 27	Macclesfield Town	1–3	Cheltenham Town	Moss Rose
15:00	Marshall 30'; Tremarco (yellow card) 43'; Kay (yellow card) 66'		Sido Jombati 37'; Goulding 67'; Garbutt 90+4'	Attendance: 1,659

7 February 2012 28	Crawley Town	4–2	Cheltenham Town	Broadfield Stadium
19:45	Watt 12', 64' (yellow card) 89'; Barnett 14', 39'		Garbutt 5'; Bennett (yellow card) 63'; Kaid Mohamed (yellow card) 63'; Duffy 75'	Attendance: 3,871

11 February 2012 29	Hereford United	1–1	Cheltenham Town	Edgar Street
15:00	Facey 12'; Colbeck (yellow card) 30'; Clucas (yellow card) 68'		Kaid Mohamed 49'; Sido Jombati (yellow card) 90+2'	Attendance: 2,607

14 February 2012 30	Cheltenham Town	0–1	Torquay United	Abbey Business Stadium
19:45	Spencer (yellow card) 74'; Kaid Mohamed (yellow card) 75'		Morris 33'; Stevens (yellow card) 61'	Attendance: 3,010

18 February 2012 31	Dagenham & Redbridge	0–5	Cheltenham Town	Victoria Road (Dagenham)
15:00	Lewington (red card) 39'; Scott (yellow card) 44'; Doe (yellow card) 74'; Nurse (yellow card) 75'; Spillane (yellow card) 80'; Ogogo (yellow card) 84'		Summerfield 20'; Elliott 22'; Kaid Mohamed 42'; Garbutt (yellow card) 45+2'; Spencer 62'; Spillane 71' (o.g.)	Attendance: 1,516

21 February 2012 32	Cheltenham Town	0–0	AFC Wimbledon	Abbey Business Stadium
19:45	Bennett (yellow card) 42'		Midson (yellow card) 47'; Bush (yellow card) 87'	Attendance: 2,603

25 February 2012 33	Cheltenham Town	2–0	Burton Albion	Abbey Business Stadium
15:00	McGlashan 5', 73'		Dyer (yellow card) 19'; Gurrieri (yellow card) 30'; Ada (yellow card) 53' (yellow-red card) 62'	Attendance: 2,945

3 March 2012 34	Cheltenham Town	2–2	Northampton Town	Abbey Business Stadium
15:00	Duffy 76', 90+3'		Tozer 20' (yellow card) 86'; Adams (yellow card) 31'; Akinfenwa 35'	Attendance: 3,503

6 March 2012 35	Morecambe	3–1	Cheltenham Town	Globe Arena
19:45	Ellison 32', 55'; Reid 48'; Hunter (yellow card) 57'		Duffy 13'	Attendance: 1,207

10 March 2012 36	Swindon Town	1–0	Cheltenham Town	County Ground, Swindon
15:00	Benson 35'		Duffy (yellow card) 31'	Attendance: 10,659

17 March 2012 37	Cheltenham Town	0–3	Gillingham	Abbey Business Stadium
15:00	Pack (yellow card) 55'		King (yellow card) 37'; Obita 45', 54'; Whelpdale 83'	Attendance: 3,137

20 March 2012 38	Shrewsbury Town	2–0	Cheltenham Town	Greenhous Meadow
19:45	Wroe 1'; Cansdell-Sherriff (yellow card) 55'; Gornell 57'		Summerfield (yellow card) 25'; Garbutt (yellow card) 66'; Elliott (yellow card) 88'; Penn (yellow card) 90+4'	Attendance: 5,705

24 March 2012 39	Cheltenham Town	0–0	Oxford United	Abbey Business Stadium
15:00			Leven (yellow card) 24'	Attendance: 4,365

30 March 2012 40	Southend United	4–0	Cheltenham Town	Roots Hall
19:45	Ferdinand 29'; Hall 39'; Eastwood 51'; Mohsni 67'		Sido Jombati (red card) 19'; Garbutt (yellow card) 64'; Pack (yellow card) 64'	Attendance: 6,525

6 April 2012 41	Cheltenham Town	2–0	Barnet	Abbey Business Stadium
15:00	Summerfield (yellow card) 73'; Kaid Mohamed 75'; McGlashan (yellow card) 79'; Spencer 88'		Hector (yellow card) 49'; Deering (yellow card) 80'	Attendance: 3,319

9 April 2012 42	Rotherham United	1–0	Cheltenham Town	Don Valley Stadium
15:00	Cresswell 90+3'			Attendance: 3,066

14 April 2012 43	Cheltenham Town	4–1	Accrington Stanley	Abbey Business Stadium
15:00	Lowe 12'; Burgess 56'; Pack 62'; Kaid Mohamed 90+2'		Guthrie (yellow card) 37'; Grant 76'; Nsiala (yellow card) 85'	Attendance: 3,217

21 April 2012 44	Crewe Alexandra	1–0	Cheltenham Town	Alexandra Stadium
15:00	Artell 44'			Attendance: 5,495

28 April 2012 45	Cheltenham Town	3–1	Bradford City	Abbey Business Stadium
15:00	Spencer 46', 63'; Pack (yellow card) 66'; Burgess 71'		Wells 8'; Ravenhill (yellow card) 66'	Attendance: 3,930

5 May 2012 46	Plymouth Argyle	1–2	Cheltenham Town	Home Park
15:00	Tsoumou 54'; Bhasera (yellow card) 68'		MacLean 23'; Pack 55'	Attendance: 8,342

==== Play-offs ====
13 May 2012 Semi-final first leg	Cheltenham Town	2–0	Torquay United	Abbey Business Stadium, Cheltenham
12:00	McGlashan 27'; Burgess 50'	Report		Attendance: 5,273; Referee: James Adcock

17 May 2012 Semi-final second leg	Torquay United	1–2	Cheltenham Town	Plainmoor, Torquay
19:45	Atieno 85'	Report	McGlashan 75'; Pack 87'	Attendance: 3,606; Referee: Andy D'Urso

27 May 2012 Final	Cheltenham Town	0–2	Crewe Alexandra	Wembley Stadium, London
15:00		Report	Powell 15'; Moore 82'	Attendance: 24,029; Referee: Craig Pawson

=== FA Cup ===
12 November 2011 First Round Proper	Tranmere Rovers	0–1	Cheltenham Town	Prenton Park, Tranmere
15:00 GMT		Report	Duffy 21' (pen.)	Attendance: 3,211; Referee: Craig Pawson

3 December 2011 Second Round Proper	Luton Town	2–4	Cheltenham Town	Kenilworth Road, Luton
15:00 GMT	O'Connor 40', 51'; Gleeson (yellow card) 62'	Summary	Duffy 2' (yellow card) 81' (yellow-red card) 83'; Pack 45'; Summerfield 64' (yellow card) 76'; Penn 90+3'	Attendance: 4,516; Referee: Colin Webster

7 January 2012 Third Round Proper	Tottenham Hotspur	3–0	Cheltenham Town	White Hart Lane, London
15:00 GMT	Defoe 24'; Pavlyuchenko 43'; Dawson (yellow card) 79' dos Santos 87'	Summary		Attendance: 35,672; Referee: Lee Mason

=== League Cup ===
9 August 2011 Round 1	Cheltenham Town	1–4	Milton Keynes Dons	Abbey Business Stadium
19:45	Summerfield 29'	Report	S. Baldock 41'; Ibehre 46'; Lewington 61'; Balanta 64'	Attendance: 1,625; Referee: James Linnington

=== Football League Trophy ===
30 August 2011 Round 1	Cheltenham Town	2–1	Torquay United	Abbey Business Stadium
19:45	Spencer 14'; Goulding 42'	Report	Macklin 60'	Attendance: 1,247; Referee: David Coote

4 October 2011 Round 2	Wycombe Wanderers	1–3	Cheltenham Town	Adams Park
	Betsy 62'	Report	Duffy 37'; Smikle 50'; Duffy 75'	Attendance: 931; Referee: Williamson

8 November 2011 Area Quarter Finals	Cheltenham Town	0–2	Barnet	Abbey Business Stadium
		Report	Marshall 44'; Taylor 68'	Attendance: 1,388; Referee: Drysdale

== Transfers ==
Players transferred in
Date	Pos.	Name	Previous club	Fee	Ref.
23 May 2011	MF	(England) Marlon Pack	(England) Portsmouth	Free	
23 May 2011	MF	(England) Russell Penn	(England) Burton Albion	Free (Bosman)	
20 June 2011	FW	(Wales) Kaid Mohamed	(England) AFC Wimbledon	Free	
4 July 2011	DF	(Republic of Ireland) Alan Bennett	(England) Wycombe Wanderers	Free	
5 July 2011	MF	(Portugal) Sido Jombati	(England) Bath City	Undisclosed Fee	
21 July 2011	FW	(Scotland) Darryl Duffy	(England) Bristol Rovers	Free	
25 July 2011	MF	(England) Bagasan Graham	(England) Queen's Park Rangers	Free	
26 July 2011	DF	(England) Harry Hooman	(England) Shrewsbury Town	Free	
4 August 2011	MF	(England) Luke Summerfield	(England) Plymouth Argyle	Free	
20 January 2012	MF	(England) Jermaine McGlashan	(England) Aldershot Town	Undisclosed	
Players loaned in
Date from	Pos.	Name	From	Date to	Ref.
22 July 2011	FW	(England) Jimmy Spencer	(England) Huddersfield Town	January 2012	
8 September 2011	GK	(England) Jack Butland	(England) Birmingham City	11 December 2011	
29 September 2011	DF	(England) Luke Garbutt	(England) Everton	End of season	
24 November 2011	MF	(England) Bobby Reid	(England) Bristol City	24 December 2011	
24 November 2011	FW	(England) Marlon Jackson	(England) Bristol City	24 December 2011	
21 February 2012	GK	(England) Jack Butland	(England) Birmingham City	16 April 2012	
22 March 2012	FW	(Scotland) Steven MacLean	(England) Yeovil Town	End of season	
22 March 2012	FW	(Republic of Ireland) Ben Burgess	(England) Notts County	End of season	
Players loaned out
Date from	Pos.	Name	To	Date to	Ref.
11 August 2011	DF	(England) Kyle Haynes	(England) Hednesford Town		
23 September 2011	DF	(England) Andy Gallinagh	(England) Bath City	28 December 2011	
9 March 2012	DF	(England) Danny Andrew	(England) Mansfield Town	End of season	
9 March 2012	DF	(England) Theo Lewis	(England) Gloucester City	End of season	
Players transferred out
Date	Pos.	Name	Subsequent club	Fee	Ref.
Players released
Date	Pos.	Name	Subsequent club	Join date	Ref.
1 June 2011	FW	(England) Wesley Thomas	(England) Crawley Town	1 July 2011 (Bosman)	
1 July 2011	MF	(England) Frankie Artus	(England) Grimsby Town	5 July 2011	
1 July 2011	DF	(England) Martin Riley	(England) Mansfield Town	14 July 2011	
1 July 2011	DF	(England) Jake Lee	(England) Bishop's Cleeve	24 July 2011	
1 July 2011	GK	(England) Daniel Lloyd-Weston	(Greece) AEL Kalloni	??	
1 July 2011	MF	(Republic of Ireland) JJ Melligan	Unattached		
24 August 2011	MF	(England) Michael Pook	(England) Brackley Town	6 November 2011	
15 November 2011	FW	(England) Ethan Moore	Unattached		
15 November 2011	DF	(England) Kyle Haynes	Unattached		
20 January 2012	DF	(England) Andy Gallinagh	(England) Bath City	20 January 2012	
24 January 2012	DF	(England) Dave Bird	(England) Gloucester City	20 March 2012	

== Awards ==
End of season awards	Winner
Supporters Player of the Year	Sido Jombati
Players' Player of the Year	Luke Summerfield
Junior Robins Player of the Year	Sido Jombati
Young Player of the Year	Marlon Pack
