= 2012 Football League Two play-off final =

Football match

- The match took place at Wembley Stadium.
- Event: 2011–12 Football League Two
Cheltenham Town	Crewe Alexandra
0	2
- Date: 27 May 2012
- Venue: Wembley Stadium, London
- Referee: Craig Pawson
- Attendance: 24,029
- Weather: Hot

The 2012 Football League Two play-off final was an association football match played on 27 May 2012 at Wembley Stadium, London, between Cheltenham Town and Crewe Alexandra. The match determined the fourth and final team to gain promotion from Football League Two, English football's fourth tier, to Football League One. The top three teams of the 2011–12 Football League Two season gained automatic promotion to League One, while those placed from fourth to seventh in the table took part in play-off semi-finals; the winners of these semi-finals competed for the final place for the 2012–13 season in League One. Cheltenham Town finished in sixth place while Crewe Alexandra ended the season in seventh position. Southend United and Torquay United were the losing semi-finalists, being defeated by Crewe and Cheltenham respectively.

The referee for the match was Craig Pawson which kicked off around 3 p.m. in front of a crowd of 24,029. In the 15th minute, Nick Powell scored to put Crewe 1–0 ahead: Kelvin Mellor found Powell, who beat a defender by flicking the ball up before striking a volley into the Cheltenham net from around 20 yards (18 m). Jeff Goulding's long-range shot then struck the Crewe crossbar before rebounding to Ben Burgess who missed the target. In the 25th minute, Goulding struck Burgess' flick-on into the Crewe net but the goal was disallowed for offside. Byron Moore's 81st minute shot was just wide of the Cheltenham's right-hand goalpost but a minute later his shot into the bottom-corner of the net after exchanged passes with A-Jay Leitch-Smith made it 2–0. Crewe won the match and gained promotion to League One.

Crewe ended their following season in thirteenth position in the League One table. Cheltenham finished in fifth place in League Two in their next season and qualified for the play-offs where they lost in the semi-finals to Northampton Town.

== Route to the final ==
Football League Two final table, leading positions
Pos	Team	Pld	W	D	L	GF	GA	GD	Pts
1	Swindon Town	46	29	6	11	75	32	+43	93
2	Shrewsbury Town	46	26	10	10	66	41	+25	88
3	Crawley Town	46	23	15	8	76	54	+22	84
4	Southend United	46	25	8	13	77	48	+29	83
5	Torquay United	46	23	12	11	63	50	+13	81
6	Cheltenham Town	46	23	8	15	66	50	+16	77
7	Crewe Alexandra	46	20	12	14	67	59	+8	72

Cheltenham Town finished the regular 2011–12 season in sixth place in Football League Two, the fourth tier of the English football league system, one position ahead of Crewe Alexandra. Both therefore missed out on the three automatic places for promotion to Football League One and instead took part in the play-offs to determine the fourth promoted team. Cheltenham Town finished seven points behind Crawley Town (who were promoted in third place), eleven behind Shrewsbury Town (who were promoted in second place), and sixteen behind league winners Swindon Town. Crewe Alexandra ended the season one place and five points behind Cheltenham Town. Crewe Alexandra had lost the first four games of their season and were fifteenth in the league at its mid-point before going on a thirteen-match unbeaten run to qualify for the play-offs. In November 2011, Dario Gradi was replaced after 1,353 games as Crewe's manager by Steve Davis with the club in 18th position.

Crewe Alexandra's opposition in the play-off semi-final was Southend United with the first match of the two-legged tie being played at Gresty Road on 12 May 2012. After a goalless first half, Adam Dugdale scored a header from a Ashley Westwood free kick early in the second half. Despite Southend having chances to score, the match ended 1–0 to Crewe. The second leg of the play-off semi-final took place four days later at Roots Hall in Southend-on-Sea. A-Jay Leitch-Smith put Crewe into the lead in the first half after striking a shot past Cameron Belford. Freddy Eastwood then saw his goal disallowed after he was adjudged to have been offside. Both he and Michael Timlin then struck the Crewe goalposts with shots before Neil Harris scored from a Chris Barker cross to level the game. Max Clayton made it 2–1 to Crewe before Barker himself scored. The game ended 2–2 and Crewe progressed to the final 3–2 on aggregate.

The second play-off semi-final saw Cheltenham Town face Torquay United and the first leg took place at Whaddon Road in Cheltenham on 13 May 2012. Jermaine McGlashan put the home side ahead in the first half with a cross-cum-shot which went in off the post. Ben Burgess then doubled his side's lead in the second half, heading past Bobby Olejnik in the Torquay goal from a McGlashan cross. Torquay's closest chance came when Ryan Jarvis struck the Cheltenham crossbar with a header, but the match ended 2–0. The second semi-final leg took place at Plainmoor in Torquay four days later. After a goalless first half, McGlashan extended Cheltenham's aggregate lead with a strike in the 75th minute after a Kaid Mohamed pass. Taiwo Atieno reduced the deficit for Torquay when he headed in Eunan O'Kane's corner. Marlon Pack then extended Cheltenham's lead with a 25-yard (23 m) free kick, and his team ended 4–1 aggregate winners, progressing to Wembley for the final.

== Match ==
=== Background ===
Cheltenham had played in two fourth tier play-off finals before 2012, winning them both. In 2002, they faced Rushden & Diamonds in the Third Division play-off final at the Millennium Stadium, winning 3–1. Four years later, Cheltenham secured promotion from the third tier of English football through the play-offs for a second time, beating Grimsby Town 1–0 in the final in Cardiff. Crewe had also appeared in two play-offs finals previously, both at the old Wembley Stadium. They lost the 1993 Football League Third Division play-off final against York City in a penalty shootout, and defeated Brentford 1–0 in the 1997 Football League Second Division play-off final. Both Cheltenham and Crewe had played in the fourth tier of English football since they were relegated in the 2008–09 season.

Crewe won both matches played between the sides during the regular season, with a 1–0 victory at Whaddon Road in October 2011 followed by a 1–0 win at Gresty Road the following April. Nick Powell was Crewe's top scorer for the season with 14 goals (all in the league), while Darryl Duffy led the scoring charts for Cheltenham with 13 (11 in the league and 2 in the FA Cup). Crewe's manager Davis believed the contest would be even: "There's no favourites. If anything they'd be, as they finished above us. But the fact that they won more games than us doesn't count for anything now."

The referee for the match was Craig Pawson who was assisted by Steve Bratt and John Brooks. The fourth official was Nigel Miller while David Rock was the reserve assistant referee. Crewe made one change to their line-up from the play-off semi-final second leg with Luke Murphy replacing Lee Bell having recovered from a groin injury. Cheltenham made two changes: Keith Lowe and James Spencer were dropped from the Cheltenham side and were replaced by Luke Garbutt and Jeff Goulding. Both sides adopted a 4–4–2 formation. According to The Daily Telegraph the match was played in "blistering temperatures".

=== Summary ===
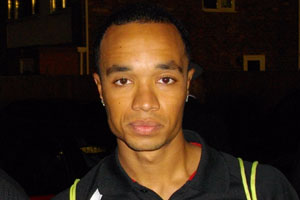
Byron Moore (pictured in 2010) scored Crewe's second goal.

The match kicked off around 3 p.m. on 27 May 2012 in front of a crowd of 24,029. The first shot of the match came in the third minute from Cheltenham's Mohamed but it was wide of the Crewe goal. Seven minutes later, Powell won the ball and passed to Murphy whose shot from the edge of the penalty area was saved by Scott Brown in the Cheltenham goal, before Leitch-Smith struck the ball wide of the goalpost. In the 12th minute McGlashan's strike was saved by Crewe goalkeeper Steve Phillips. Three minutes later Powell scored to put Crewe 1–0 ahead: Kelvin Mellor found Powell, who beat a defender by flicking the ball up before striking a volley into the Cheltenham net from around 20 yards (18 m). Goulding's long-range shot then struck the Crewe crossbar before rebounding to Burgess who missed the target. In the 25th minute, Goulding struck Burgess' flick-on into the Crewe net but the goal was disallowed for offside. Mohamed's 27th minute shot went high over the Crewe goal before Goulding's strike was over the bar six minutes later. Powell then struck a shot from distance wide of the goal in the 36th minute before Mellor's close-range header went over Cheltenham's crossbar five minutes later. Phillips then saved from a Goulding header before the referee blew the whistle for half-time with Crewe leading 1–0.

Neither side made any change to their personnel during the interval. Six minutes into the second half, Pack's 20-yard (18 m) low strike was just wide of the Crewe goal. A mistake from Dugdale saw Mohamed run through on goal in the 54th minute, but Phillips made the save. A free kick from Westwood in the 71st minute found Dugdale in the Cheltenham penalty area but his control was poor and allowed Brown to block his shot. In the 75th minute, Cheltenham made their first substitution of the match with Duffy coming on to replace Goulding. Pack's long-range strike then went of Crewe's goal before Powell was substituted for Clayton. Byron Moore's 81st minute shot was just wide of the Cheltenham's right-hand goalpost but a minute later his shot into the bottom-corner of the net after exchanged passes with Leitch-Smith made it 2–0. In the 83rd minute, Cheltenham made a double-substitution, with Russell Penn and Spencer coming on for Pack and Burgess. Soon after Carl Martin came on for Leitch-Smith before Brown made saves from both Moore and Clayton. Deep into stoppage time, Bell came on for Moore and the final whistle was blown, Crewe winning 2–0 and gaining promotion to League One.

=== Details ===
27 May 2012
15:00 BST

Cheltenham Town	0–2	Crewe Alexandra
		Powell 15'; Moore 82'

Wembley Stadium, London
Attendance: 24,029
Referee: Craig Pawson

Cheltenham Town	Crewe Alexandra

Cheltenham Town:
GK	1	Scott Brown
DF	22	Sido Jombati
DF	15	Alan Bennett
DF	6	Steve Elliott
DF	19	Luke Garbutt
MF	20	Jermaine McGlashan
MF	7	Marlon Pack	(substituted off) 84'
MF	25	Luke Summerfield
MF	23	Kaid Mohamed
FW	10	Jeff Goulding	(substituted off) 75'
FW	29	Ben Burgess	(substituted off) 84'
Substitutes:
DF	2	Keith Lowe
MF	11	Brian Smikle
MF	16	Russell Penn	(substituted on) 84'
FW	9	Darryl Duffy	(substituted on) 75'
FW	14	Jimmy Spencer	(substituted on) 84'
Manager:
Mark Yates

Crewe Alexandra:
GK	1	Steve Phillips
DF	3	Harry Davis
DF	5	David Artell
DF	6	Adam Dugdale
DF	17	Kelvin Mellor
MF	11	Byron Moore	(substituted off) 90+7'
MF	4	Ashley Westwood
MF	8	Luke Murphy
MF	2	Matt Tootle
FW	10	A-Jay Leitch-Smith	(substituted off) 85'
FW	25	Nick Powell	(substituted off) 80'
Substitutes:
GK	13	Alan Martin
DF	15	Carl Martin	(substituted on) 85'
MF	7	Lee Bell	(substituted on) 90+7'
FW	19	Max Clayton	(substituted on) 80'
FW	34	Billy Bodin
Manager:
Steve Davis

Assistant referees:
Steve Bratt
John Brooks
Fourth official:
Nigel Miller
Reserve Assistant Referee:
David Rock

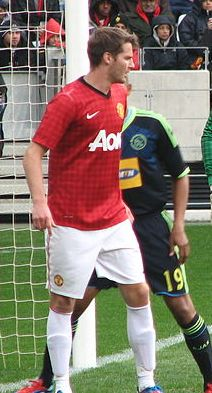
Nick Powell pictured playing for Manchester United scored the opening goal for Crewe.

Statistics
	Cheltenham Town	Crewe Alexandra
Goals	0	2
Disallowed goals	1	0
Total shots	20	16
Shots on target	5	5
Ball possession	47%	53%
Corner kicks	8	6
Fouls committed	11	8
Offsides	7	4
Yellow cards	0	0
Red cards	0	0

== Post-match ==
Davis, the winning manager, recalled his chairman's instruction after taking over in November 2011: "Get us out of the bottom six. Just get us safe." His counterpart Yates was proud of his side: "They've been brilliant ... Today was just one step too far." Speaking of Powell's goal, he said: "It was a wonder strike from a prodigious talent and we couldn't do much about that one". Powell signed for Manchester United two weeks after the final. The defeat was Cheltenham's first in the play-offs, having won five and drawn three of their previous post-season matches.

Crewe ended their following season in thirteenth position in the League One table. Cheltenham finished in fifth place in League Two in their next season and qualified for the play-offs where they lost in the semi-finals to Northampton Town.
