= 2012–13 Cheltenham Town F.C. season =

Cheltenham Town F.C.
2012–13 season
- Chairman: Paul Baker
- Manager: Mark Yates
- Stadium: Whaddon Road
- League Two: 5th
- FA Cup: Third round (eliminated by Everton)
- League Cup: First round (eliminated by Milton Keynes Dons)
- Football League Trophy: Second round (eliminated by Oxford United)

The 2012–13 season was 126th season of Cheltenham Town's existence, and their 13th in the Football League since promotion from the Conference National in 2000.

Cheltenham's first game of the 2012–13 season was at home to Milton Keynes Dons in the League Cup, before then hosting Dagenham and Redbridge in their first League Two match of the season on 18 August 2012.

Cheltenham were in contention for automatic promotion until the final day of the season, but ultimately finished 5th and had to settle for the playoffs, in which they lost 2–0 on aggregate to Northampton Town.

== First team ==
As of 30 March 2013.

No.	Name	Nationality	Age	Club apps.	Club goals	Previous club	Notes
Goalkeepers
1	Scott Brown	(England)	41	158	0	Bristol City	
12	Connor Roberts	(Wales)	33	0	0	Everton	
Defenders
2	Keith Lowe	(England)	41	67	2	Hereford United	
3	Billy Jones	(England)	43	0	0	Exeter City	
5	Harry Hooman	(England)	35	2	0	Shrewsbury Town	
6	Steve Elliott	(England)	48	79	3	Bristol Rovers	
22	Sido Jombati	(Portugal)	39	36	3	Bath City	
27	Michael Hector	(England)	34	13	0	Reading	
	Jack Deaman	(England)		0	0	Birmingham City	
18	Lewis Tasker	(England)	35	72	4	Exeter City	
Midfielders
4	Darren Carter	(England)	42	32	6	Preston North End	
7	Marlon Pack	(England)	35	81	7	Portsmouth	
8	Sam Deering	(England)	35	0	0	Barnet	
11	Jermaine McGlashan	(England)	38	16	2	Aldershot Town	
16	Russell Penn	(England)	41	43	1	Burton Albion	
21	Bagasan Graham	(England)	34	7	0	Queens Park Rangers	
25	Jason Taylor	(England)	39	12	0	Rotherham United	
Forwards
9	Darryl Duffy	(Scotland)	42	41	11	Bristol Rovers	
14	Shaun Harrad	(England)	41	0	0	Bury	
19	Paul Benson	(England)	47	13	4	Swindon Town	
23	Kaid Mohamed	(Wales)	42	45	11	AFC Wimbledon	
29	Byron Harrison	(England)	39	12	1	AFC Wimbledon	

=== Transfers ===
==== In ====
Date	Player	Position	Transferred from	Fee	Ref.
5 July 2012	(England) Sam Deering	MF	Barnet	Free	
11 July 2012	(England) Billy Jones	DF	Exeter City	Free	
11 July 2012	(England) Lewis Tasker	DF	Exeter City	Undisclosed	
2 August 2012	(England) Chris Zebroski	FW	Bristol Rovers	Undisclosed	
3 August 2012	(England) Shaun Harrad	FW	Bury	Season-long loan	
9 August 2012	(Wales) Connor Roberts	GK	Everton	Free	
23 August 2012	(England) Darren Carter	MF	Preston North End	Free, six-month contract	
25 October 2012	(England) Lawson D'Ath	MF	Reading	One month loan	
25 October 2012	(England) Jake Taylor	MF	Reading	One month loan	
25 January 2013	(Northern Ireland) Luke McCullough	DF	Manchester United	Loan, recalled 6 March 2013	
28 January 2013	(England) Jason Taylor	MF	Rotherham United	Free	
29 January 2013	(England) Paul Benson	FW	Swindon Town	Loan until end of season	
30 January 2013	(England) Michael Hector	DF	Reading	Loan until end of season	
31 January 2013	(England) Byron Harrison	FW	AFC Wimbledon	Undisclosed fee	
28 March 2013	(England) Jack Deaman	DF	Birmingham City	Loan until end of season	

==== Out ====
Date	Player	Position	Transferred to	Fee	Ref.
3 July 2012	Luke Summerfield	MF	Shrewsbury Town	Free	
	Brian Smikle	MF	Hereford United	Free	
13 September 2012	Danny Andrew	DF	Cambridge United	One month loan	
13 December 2012	Danny Andrew	DF	Gloucester City	One month loan	
13 December 2012	Bagasan Graham	FW	Gloucester City	One month loan	
4 January 2013	Chris Zebroski	FW	Eastleigh	Contract terminated	
18 January 2013	Danny Andrew	DF	Gloucester City	Free	
31 January 2013	Alan Bennett	DF	AFC Wimbledon	Free	
31 January 2013	Jeff Goulding	FW	Aldershot Town	Free	

== Competitions ==
=== Overall ===
Competition	Started round	Current position / round	Final position / round	First match	Last match
League Two	—	5th		18 August 2012	27 April 2013
League Cup	1st round	1st round	1st round	11 August 2012	11 August 2012
Football League Trophy	2nd round	—			
FA Cup	1st round	—			

Updated to match played 19 June 2012
Source: Competitions

=== League Two ===
==== Standings ====
Pos	Team	Pld	W	D	L	GF	GA	GD	Pts	Promotion, qualification or relegation
3	Port Vale (P)	46	21	15	10	87	52	+35	78	Promotion to Football League One
4	Burton Albion	46	22	10	14	71	65	+6	76	Qualification for League Two play-offs (Note: Four teams play for one spot and promotion to Football League One.)
5	Cheltenham Town	46	20	15	11	58	51	+7	75	Qualification for League Two play-offs
6	Northampton Town	46	21	10	15	64	55	+9	73	Qualification for League Two play-offs
7	Bradford City (O, P)	46	18	15	13	63	52	+11	69	Qualification for League Two play-offs

Updated to match(es) played on 27 April 2013. Source: BBC Sport
Rules for classification: 1) Points; 2) Goal difference; 3) Number of goals scored
(O) Play-off winners; (P) Promoted

==== Results summary ====
Overall								Home						Away					
Pld	W	D	L	GF	GA	GD	Pts	W	D	L	GF	GA	GD	W	D	L	GF	GA	GD
46	20	15	11	58	51	+7	75	14	7	2	34	16	+18	6	8	9	24	35	−11

Last updated: 27 April 2013.

==== Results by round ====
Round	1	2	3	4	5	6	7	8	9	10	11	12	13	14	15	16	17	18	19	20	21	22	23	24	25	26	27	28	29	30	31	32	33	34	35	36	37	38	39	40	41	42	43	44	45	46
Ground	H	A	A	H	A	H	H	A	H	A	H	A	A	H	H	A	H	A	A	H	A	H	A	H	A	H	A	H	H	H	A	A	H	A	A	H	H	A	H	A	A	H	A	H	A	H
Result	W	D	W	L	D	L	W	D	W	W	D	W	L	W	W	D	W	L	L	W	W	D	L	W	L	D	D	D	W	D	L	W	D	D	D	W	W	L	W	D	L	W	L	W	W	D
Position	7	5	3	10	9	15	9	11	5	5		3	4	4	3	3	3	3	3	3	3	3	3	3	4	5	4	5	3	3	5	3	4	6	7	6	3	5	4	5	5	4	4	4	4	5

Updated to match(es) played on 27 April 2013. Source:
A = Away; H = Home; W = Win; D = Draw; L = Loss

=== Scores Overview ===
Cheltenham Town score given first.

Opposition	Home Score	Away Score
Accrington Stanley	0–3	2–2
AFC Wimbledon	2–1	2–1
Aldershot Town	1–1	1–0
Barnet	1–0	0–0
Bradford City	0–0	1–3
Bristol Rovers	1–1	1–0
Burton Albion	1–0	1–3
Chesterfield	1–0	1–4
Dagenham & Redbridge	2–0	0–1
Exeter City	3–0	1–0
Fleetwood Town	2–2	1–1
Gillingham	1–0	1–1
Morecambe	2–0	0–0
Northampton Town	1–0	3–2
Oxford United	2–1	0–1
Plymouth Argyle	2–1	0–2
Port Vale	1–1	2–3
Rochdale	0–0	1–4
Rotherham United	3–0	2–4
Southend United	1–3	2–1
Torquay United	2–1	2–2
Wycombe Wanderers	4–0	1–1
York City	1–1	0–0

== Matches ==
Won Drawn Lost Postponed

=== Pre-season friendlies ===
21 July 2012	Evesham United	1–1	Cheltenham Town	Spiers & Hartwell Jubilee Stadium
15:00	Hamilton (og) 57'		Plummer 80'	Attendance: 657

24 July 2012	Port Talbot Town	1–1	Cheltenham Town	GenQuip Stadium
19:45	John 15'		Duffy 47'	Attendance: 160

28 July 2012	Cheltenham Town	1–0	Birmingham City	Whaddon Road
15:00	Hooman 12'			Attendance: 2,636

31 July 2012	Cheltenham Town	0–4	Cardiff City	Whaddon Road
19:45			Taylor 27'; Earnshaw 32'; Conway 45'; Whittingham 53'	Attendance: 1,615

4 August 2012	Cheltenham Town	0–4	Burnley	Whaddon Road
15:00			Austin 32', 49'; Mills 66'; Wallace 70'	Attendance: 1,082

7 August 2012	Solihull Moors	1–2	Cheltenham Town	Damson Park
19:45

=== League Two ===
18 August 2012	Cheltenham Town	2–0	Dagenham and Redbridge	Whaddon Road
15:00	Harrad 45'; McGlashan 49'			Attendance: 2,655

21 August 2012	Torquay United	2–2	Cheltenham Town	Plainmoor
19:45	Downes 22'; Howe 23'		Harrad 15'; Zebroski 80'	Attendance: 2,517

25 August 2012	Aldershot Town	0–1	Cheltenham Town	The Recreation Ground
15:00			Harrad 73'	Attendance: 2,166

1 September 2012	Cheltenham Town	0–3	Accrington Stanley	Whaddon Road
15:00			Amond 3'; Miller 33'; Boco 47'	Attendance: 2,708

8 September 2012	Wycombe Wanderers	1–1	Cheltenham Town	Adams Park
15:00	Lowe 3' (o.g.)		Harrad 38' (pen.)	Attendance: 3,667

15 September 2012	Cheltenham Town	1–3	Southend United	Whaddon Road
15:00	McGlashan 15'		Clohessy 44'; Assombalonga 49'; Phillips 52'	Attendance: 2,751

18 September 2012	Cheltenham Town	2–1	Oxford United	Whaddon Road
19:45	Carter 29'; Harrad 60'		Leven 80' (pen.)	Attendance: 3,037

22 September 2012	York City	0–0	Cheltenham Town	Bootham Crescent
15:00				Attendance: 3,477

28 September 2012	Cheltenham Town	2–0	Morecambe	Whaddon Road
19:45	Carter 2', 90+1'		Ellison (red card) 57'	Attendance: 2,563

3 October 2012	Bristol Rovers	0–1	Cheltenham Town	The Memorial Stadium
19:45			Zebroski 39'	Attendance: 5,747

6 October 2012	Cheltenham Town	2–2	Fleetwood Town	Whaddon Road
15:00	Goulding 64'; Jombati 74'; Bennett (red card) 90+3'		Ball 32'; Brown 90+2'	Attendance: 2,702

13 October 2012	AFC Wimbledon	1–2	Cheltenham Town	Kingsmeadow
15:00	Harrison 90+1'		Pack 25'; Mohamed 56'	Attendance: 4,409

20 October 2012	Bradford City	3–1	Cheltenham Town	Valley Parade
15:00	Wells 45+4' (pen.), 68'; Meredith 83'		Pack 30' (pen.)	Attendance: 9,648

23 October 2012	Cheltenham Town	2–1	Plymouth Argyle	Whaddon Road
19:45	Elliott 37'; Mohamed 78'		Hourihane 30'	Attendance: 3,058

27 October 2012	Cheltenham Town	3–0	Exeter City	Whaddon Road
15:00	D'Ath 55'; Lowe 62', 87'			Attendance: 3,545

6 November 2012	Gillingham	0–0	Cheltenham Town	Priestfield
19:45				Attendance: 6,096

10 November 2012	Cheltenham Town	1–0	Burton Albion	Whaddon Road
15:00	Zebroski 86'			Attendance: 2,804

17 November 2012	Rotherham United	4–2	Cheltenham Town	New York Stadium
15:00	Nardiello 4', 29'; Pringle 20'; Frecklington 90+2'		Lowe 1'; Zebroski 31'	Attendance: 6,705

20 November 2012	Chesterfield	4–1	Cheltenham Town	Proact Stadium
19:45	Atkinson 16'; Togwell 45'; Richards 59'; Lester 75'		Mohamed 57'	Attendance: 4,333

24 November 2012	Cheltenham Town	1–0	Barnet	Whaddon Road
15:00	Goulding 80'			Attendance: 2,591

8 December 2012	Northampton Town	2–3	Cheltenham Town	Sixfields
15:00	Akinfenwa 2'; Jones 14' (o.g.)		Carter 25'; Zebroski 28'; Duffy 80'	Attendance: 4,625

15 December 2012	Cheltenham Town	1–1	Port Vale	Whaddon Road
15:00	Carter 61'		Dodds 67'	Attendance: 3,670

21 December 2012	Rochdale	4–1	Cheltenham	Spotland
19:45	Grant 38'; Ashley Grimes 45+2', 67'; Adebola 69'		Edwards 48' (o.g.)	Attendance: 1,605

26 December 2012	Cheltenham Town	4–0	Wycombe Wanderers	Whaddon Road
15:00	Jake Taylor 29'; Goulding 32'; Duffy 54'; McGlashan 69'			Attendance: 3,501

29 December 2012	Cheltenham Town	P-P	Bristol Rovers	Whaddon Road

1 January 2013	Oxford United	1–0	Cheltenham Town	Kassam Stadium
15:00	Leven 16' (pen.)			Attendance: 6,951

12 January 2013	Cheltenham Town	1–1	York City	Whaddon Road
15:00	Harrad 67' (pen.)		Walker 84'	Attendance: 2,881

18 January 2013	Morecambe	0–0	Cheltenham Town	Globe Arena
19:45				Attendance: 1,586

25 January 2013	Cheltenham Town	0–0	Rochdale	Whaddon Road
19:45				Attendance: 2,348

2 February 2013	Cheltenham Town	2–1	Torquay United	Whaddon Road
15:00	Lowe 33'; Harrad 51'		Howe 88'	Attendance: 2,961

5 February 2013	Cheltenham Town	1–1	Bristol Rovers	Whaddon Road
19:45	Harrad 45+3'		Norburn 90+5'	Attendance: 4,436

9 February 2013	Dagenham & Redbridge	1–0	Cheltenham Town	Victoria Road
15:00	Howell 58'			Attendance: 1,526

12 February 2013	Southend United	1–2	Cheltenham Town	Roots Hall
19:45	Reeves 90+2'		Pack 13' (pen.); Benson 38'	Attendance: 3,908

16 February 2013	Cheltenham Town	1–1	Aldershot Town	Whaddon Road
15:00	Benson 67'		Rose 23'	Attendance: 3,119

23 February 2013	Accrington Stanley	2–2	Cheltenham Town	Crown Ground
15:00	Beattie 40', 64'		Pack 32' (pen.), 70'	Attendance: 1,216

26 February 2013	Fleetwood Town	1–1	Cheltenham Town	Highbury
19:45	Brown 69'		Pack 24'	Attendance: 2,031

2 March 2013	Cheltenham Town	2–1	AFC Wimbledon	Whaddon Road
15:00	Elliott 10'; Carter 56'		Dickenson 63'	Attendance: 3,177

5 March 2013	Cheltenham Town	1–0	Chesterfield	Whaddon Road
19:45	Benson 90+2'			Attendance: 2,195

9 March 2013	Burton Albion	3–1	Cheltenham Town	Pirelli Stadium
15:00	MacDonald 22'; Weir 26', 48'		Harrison 90+2'	Attendance: 2,680

16 March 2013	Cheltenham Town	3–0	Rotherham United	Whaddon Road
15:00	McGlashan 32'; Pack 41'; Elliott 84'			Attendance: 3,241

23 March 2013	Barnet	0–0	Cheltenham Town	Underhill
15:00				Attendance: 2,400

29 March 2013	Port Vale	3–2	Cheltenham Town	Vale Park
15:00	Pope 19', 58', 74'		Mohamed 47'; Benson 54'	Attendance: 5,867

1 April 2013	Cheltenham Town	1–0	Northampton Town	Whaddon Road
15:00	Elliott 44'			Attendance: 4,042

6 April 2013	Plymouth Argyle	2–0	Cheltenham Town	Home Park
15:00	Reid 40'; Hector 54' (o.g.)

13 April 2013	Cheltenham Town	1–0	Gillingham	Whaddon Road
15:00	Hector 67'

20 April 2013	Exeter City	0–1	Cheltenham Town	St James Park
15:00			Penn 5'	Attendance: 4,042

27 April 2013	Cheltenham Town	0–0	Bradford City	Whaddon Road
15:00

==== Play-offs ====
2 May 2013	Northampton Town	1–0	Cheltenham Town	Sixfields, Northampton
19:45 BST	O'Donovan 26'	Report		Attendance: 6,563; Referee: Mick Russell

5 May 2013	Cheltenham Town	0–1	Northampton Town	Abbey Business Stadium, Cheltenham
18:45 BST		Report	Guttridge 28'	Attendance: 5,955; Referee: Andrew Madley

=== League Cup ===
11 August 2012 First Round	Cheltenham Town	1–1 (a.e.t.) (3–5 p)	Milton Keynes Dons	Whaddon Road
15:00	Mohamed 58'		Bowditch 45'	Attendance: 1,660
	Penalties
	Jones (penalty scored); Duffy (penalty missed); Harrad (penalty scored); Mohamed (penalty scored)		Bowditch (penalty scored); MacDonald (penalty scored); MacKenzie (penalty scored); Kay (penalty scored); Lowe (penalty scored)

=== Football League Trophy ===
9 October 2012	Cheltenham Town	2–4	Oxford United	Whaddon Road
19:45	Duffy 31'; Lowe 45'		Craddock 35'; Worley 67'; Constable 71'; Peter Leven 81' (pen.)	Attendance: 1,236

== See also ==
- 2012–13 in English football
- 2012–13 Football League Two
