= Kaid Mohamed =

Welsh footballer (born 1984)

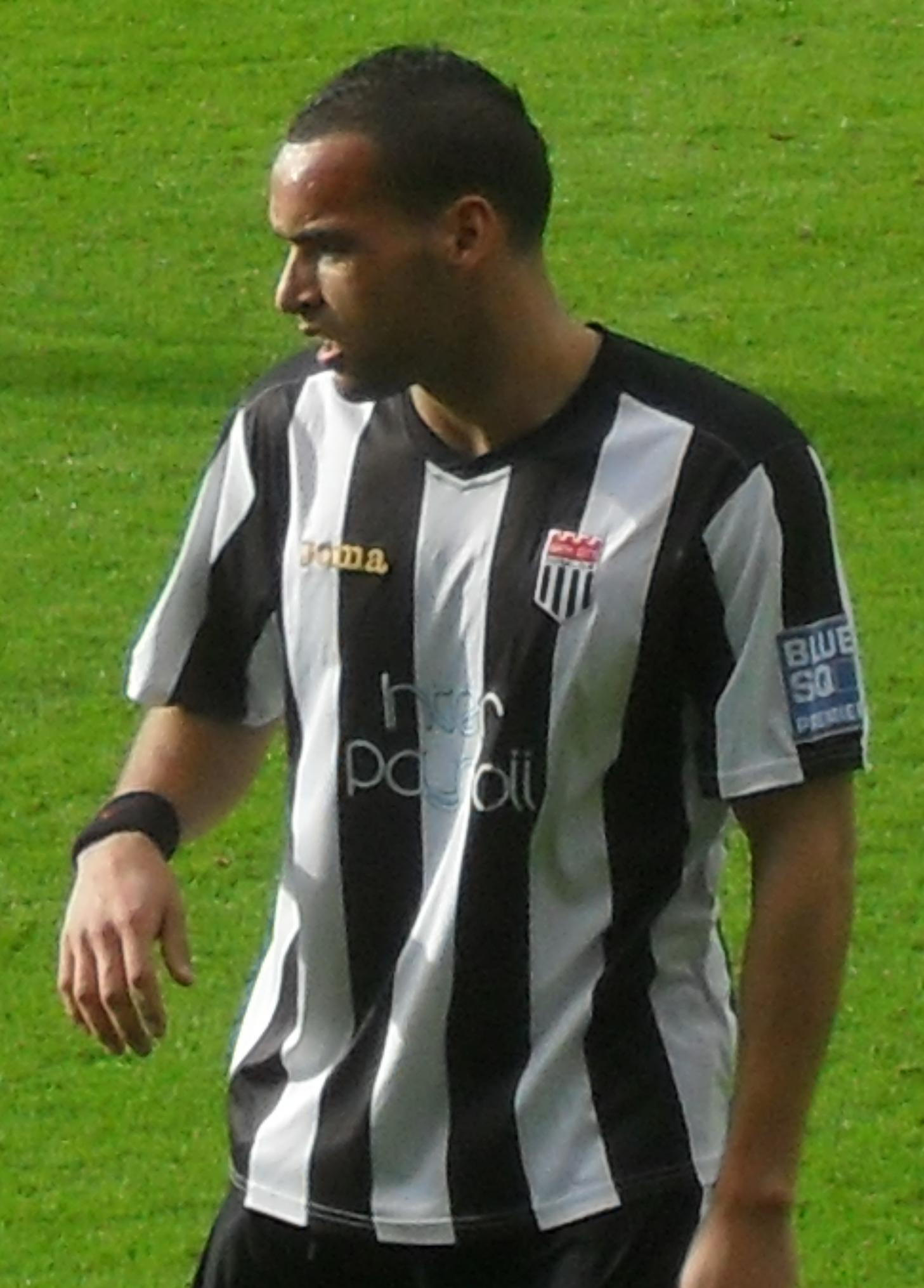
- Mohamed playing for Bath City in 2010

Personal information
- Full name: Kaid Yusef Mohamed
- Date of birth: 23 July 1984 (age 42)
- Place of birth: Cardiff, Wales
- Height: 5 ft 11 in (1.80 m)
- Positions: Winger; forward

Youth career
- Ely Rangers

Senior career*
Years	Team	Apps	(Gls)
2003–2005	Cwmbrân Town	55	(12)
2005	Llanelli	3	(1)
2005	Carmarthen Town	14	(4)
2005	Cwmbrân Town	11	(7)
2005–2006	Llanelli	5	(0)
2006–2007	Carmarthen Town	30	(15)
2007–2008	Swindon Town	11	(0)
2008	→ Torquay United (loan)	10	(2)
2008–2009	Forest Green Rovers	27	(3)
2009	→ Newport County (loan)	1	(0)
2009–2011	Bath City	65	(26)
2011	AFC Wimbledon	7	(1)
2011–2013	Cheltenham Town	84	(15)
2013–2015	Port Vale	6	(0)
2013–2014	→ AFC Wimbledon (loan)	5	(0)
2014	→ Bristol Rovers (loan)	21	(3)
2014–2015	→ Northampton Town (loan)	23	(4)
2015	Port Talbot Town	4	(1)
2015	Accrington Stanley	3	(0)
2015–2016	Bath City	8	(3)
2016	Eastleigh	5	(0)
2016	→ Tamworth (loan)	9	(3)
2016	Kettering Town	12	(0)
2016–2017	Weston-super-Mare	3	(0)
2017	Wealdstone	2	(0)
2017–2018	Bath City	1	(0)
2018	Chippenham Town	9	(0)
2018–2019	Haverfordwest County	3	(1)
2019	Goytre		
2019–2020	Afan Lido		
2020–2021	Salisbury		
2022	Carmarthen Town		
- * Club domestic league appearances and goals

Kaid Yusef Mohamed (born 23 July 1984) is a Welsh former footballer who played as a winger. He spent the early part of his career in Welsh football with Ely Rangers, Cwmbrân Town, Llanelli, and Carmarthen Town. He came to prominence in the 2006–07 season, scoring two goals for Carmarthen in their Welsh Cup final victory.

He left Carmarthen to go and play in the English Football League after he was handed a professional contract by Swindon Town in June 2007. From Swindon, he was loaned out to Torquay United before dropping into the Conference Premier permanently with Forest Green Rovers. After losing his first-team place at Rovers, he was loaned out to Newport County before dropping into the Conference South with Bath City. He helped Bath to win promotion at the end of the 2009–10 season, scoring the only goal of the play-off final.

He left Bath for AFC Wimbledon in March 2011 and played for the "Dons" in their Conference Premier play-off final victory. He signed with Cheltenham Town in June 2011 and played in two unsuccessful League Two play-off campaigns before transferring to Port Vale in June 2013. He was loaned back to Wimbledon in November 2013 and then to Bristol Rovers in January 2014. He joined Northampton Town on loan for the 2014–15 season. After a brief spell with Port Talbot Town, he re-joined Bath City via Accrington Stanley in October 2015. He signed with Eastleigh in January 2016 before being loaned out to Tamworth two months later. Later in the year, he moved on to Weston-super-Mare via Kettering Town. He joined Wealdstone in August 2017 before joining Chippenham Town via Bath City in February 2018. He returned to the Welsh leagues with Haverfordwest County in December 2018. He moved on to Afan Lido via Goytre in 2019. He later played for Salisbury before returning a third time to Carmarthen Town in July 2022. In October 2023, he was sentenced to eleven years and six months in prison for conspiracy to supply class A drugs.

== Career ==
=== Welsh Premier League ===
Mohamed played youth football for Chalkie Whites Youth Club, Danescourt and Taffs Well. He moved from Welsh Football League side Ely Rangers to Cwmbrân Town at the start of the 2003–04 season after catching the eye of manager Brian Coyne. He established himself in the Welsh Premier League as a regular goalscorer and moved to Llanelli two years later, before returning to the Cwmbran Stadium. He re-signed with Llanelli in December 2005 before moving on to Carmarthen Town in February 2006. He was a full-time professional during his brief time at Stebonheath Park, but did not impress for the "Reds". He scored 15 goals for "Old Gold" in the 2006–07 season and helped the side win the Welsh Cup, scoring twice during a 3–2 win over Afan Lido in the final.

=== Swindon Town ===
Mohamed went on trial at League Two side Wrexham in June 2007, scoring against Blackburn Rovers in a pre-season friendly before adding a brace in a 4–1 win over Dungannon Swifts during a pre-season tour of Republic of Ireland. Despite manager Brian Carey being keen to sign him, Wrexham lost out to League One club Swindon Town, who signed Mohamed to a one-year contract on 1 August after manager Paul Sturrock was impressed by his performance in a trial game. He made his "Robins" debut 10 days later as a substitute in place of Christian Roberts during a 1–1 draw with Northampton Town at Sixfields. He made his first start at the County Ground in the Football League Trophy on 9 October, in a 3–1 defeat to Cheltenham Town. Two months later he made a series of appearances on the right-side of a five-man midfield, as caretaker-managers David Byrne and Ady Williams experimented with the first-team.

On 26 January 2008, he joined Paul Buckle's Conference Premier side Torquay United on loan, making ten appearances, scoring his only goals at Plainmoor with a brace against Ebbsfleet United, before returning to Swindon in March. He was released by Swindon manager Maurice Malpas at the end of the 2007–08 season.

=== Forest Green Rovers ===
After his release from Swindon, he signed for Conference Premier side Forest Green Rovers. Initially a regular in the first-team, making 21 league appearances during the first half of the season, manager Jim Harvey told Mohamed to look for a new club in January 2009. He joined Dean Holdsworth's Conference South side Newport County on a one-month loan deal at Newport Stadium. After returning to The New Lawn, he scored a crucial goal in the 85th minute of a 1–0 win over Ebbsfleet United in the semi-final of the Conference League Cup to advance the club to the final. Rovers lost the final on penalties to AFC Telford United. Mohamed was released at the end of the 2008–09 season when he was not offered a new contract.

=== Bath City ===
In August 2009, Mohamed signed for Bath City on a non-contract basis, making his debut as an 80th-minute substitute replacing Darren Edwards in a 1–0 win over Maidenhead United at Twerton Park. He scored three goals in the Conference South play-offs, including the only goal of the game in the play-off final win over Woking which promoted Bath to the Conference Premier.

He scored 13 goals in 34 league games in the 2010–11 season, scoring in five consecutive games. In March 2011, he refused to sit on the bench for Bath's game with Grimsby Town; manager Adie Britton later made a statement that read: "When I named the side he was not in it. He was upset and said he wanted no part in the game, he has made it clear that he wants to go back to full-time football".

=== AFC Wimbledon ===
On 25 March 2011, less than a week after the incident at Bath, Terry Brown, manager at Conference Premier rivals AFC Wimbledon, signed Mohamed for a 'nominal' fee on a short-term contract. He made his debut just a day later at Kingsmeadow in Wimbledon's 1–0 win over Rushden & Diamonds, and was named as the man of the match. He scored his first goal for the "Dons" when he scored the second goal in a 2–1 win over Cambridge United at the Abbey Stadium. He followed this up with a goal in the first leg of the Conference play-off semi-final before he went on to score a hat-trick in the second leg, resulting in an 8–1 aggregate win over Fleetwood Town. He was on the winning side in the play-off final at the City of Manchester Stadium, despite missing his penalty in the shoot-out against Luton Town.

=== Cheltenham Town ===
Mohamed signed a two-year contract with League Two club Cheltenham Town in June 2011. He scored his first goal for the "Robins" at Whaddon Road in a 3–1 victory over Crawley Town, ending Crawley's unbeaten run of 34 league matches. He ended the 2011–12 season as the club's joint top-scorer (with Darryl Duffy) in the league, netting 11 times as they qualified for the play-offs in sixth position. He played 45 of 46 league games, missing the trip to Plymouth Argyle as several players were rested for the play-off semi-finals. He also played in the FA Cup third round defeat to Premier League side Tottenham Hotspur at White Hart Lane. Mohamed was on the losing side in the play-off final as Cheltenham lost 2–0 to Crewe Alexandra at Wembley Stadium.

Cheltenham pushed for promotion again in 2012–13, but this time lost out to Northampton Town in the play-off semi-finals. Mohammed scored seven goals in 47 appearances, including the winning extra time goal at Hereford United that took Cheltenham to a financially lucrative third round FA Cup tie with Premier League Everton. He provided the assist for Russell Penn's goal against Everton, though Cheltenham still lost the game 5–1. As his contract reached its expiry date, Mohammed made it clear to manager Mark Yates that he would be leaving the club; Yates said that "I just respect his honesty... at least he had the guts to tell me to my face and we shook hands".

=== Port Vale ===
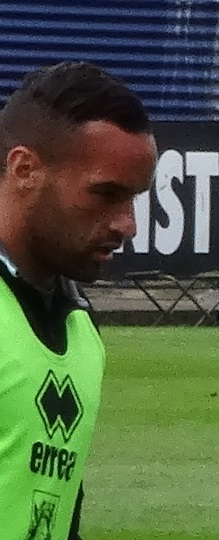
Mohamed training with Northampton Town in 2014

Mohamed signed a two-year contract with newly promoted League One side Port Vale in June 2013. Both the player and his agent, Phil Sproson, stated that the attacking play manager Micky Adams had installed on the wide Vale Park pitch made the club a good fit for Mohamed. He was signed to replace departing left-winger Ashley Vincent, who left the club a few weeks earlier. He started the 2013–14 season on the bench.

In November 2013, Mohamed re-joined AFC Wimbledon, now in League Two, on loan until 4 January 2014. He played five games for the "Dons". On 23 January, Mohamed joined Bristol Rovers, also of League Two, on loan for the remainder of the 2013–14 season. Three days later he marked his debut for the "Pirates" with the opening goal of a 3–1 victory over Severnside derby rivals Newport County, earning himself a place on the Football League team of the week. He played a total of 21 games for the "Gas", who were relegated out of the English Football League on the final day of the season with a 1–0 defeat to Mansfield Town at the Memorial Stadium.

In June 2014, he agreed to join League Two side Northampton Town on loan for the whole of the 2014–15 season. Alan Knill, assistant manager for the "Cobblers", said that "We see Kaid coming off the left wing. When he played here for Bristol Rovers, he made some great movement inside and between strikers, and when we knew he would be available, we said, 'Let's try and get him'." He marked his debut with the only goal of the game against Mansfield Town on the opening day of the season at Sixfields on 9 August. He scored a brace in a 5–1 win over Hartlepool United on 16 September, earning himself a place on the Football League team of the week. He broke a metatarsal in January and underwent surgery on the injury, keeping him out of action for three months. He was released by new Port Vale manager Rob Page in May 2015.

=== Later career ===
Mohamed returned to the Welsh Premier League with Port Talbot Town in August 2015.

He joined League Two side Accrington Stanley on non-contract terms in October 2015. Later in the month he returned to former club Bath City, despite having left under acrimonious circumstances four years previously, and scored on his returning debut for the club. He moved on to Eastleigh in January 2016. He scored his first goal for the "Spitfires" on 19 January, in a 3–2 FA Cup third round defeat to Championship Bolton Wanderers at the Macron Stadium. He was loaned out to National League North side Tamworth on 4 March.

Mohamed signed with Southern League Premier Division club Kettering Town in August 2016, with the manager Marcus Law stating that "I have gone out of my way to try to make this happen". He went 12 games without a goal for the "Poppies" before he joined National League South club Weston-super-Mare in October 2016. He picked up a muscle strain soon after signing and upon his recovery failed to dislodge regular first-team players Dayle Grubb, Brad Ash and Gethyn Hill and so agreed to leave the club by mutual consent in January 2017. He returned to the National League South in August 2017, signing with Wealdstone. Two months later he rejoined former club Bath City. He signed a three-month contract with Chippenham Town in February 2018. He made nine appearances in the latter half of the 2017–18 season as the "Bluebirds" finished in 13th-place in the National League South. On 6 December 2018, he signed with Welsh Football League Division One club Haverfordwest County, also known as the "Bluebirds". He scored one goal in six matches for County during the 2018–19 season, before joining Goytre on 16 March. On 24 August 2019, he signed for Cymru South club Afan Lido. The club finished tenth in the 2019–20 season.

In July 2022, Mohamed returned to Carmarthen Town for the 2022–23 Cymru South season after serving one year in prison for cocaine dealing.

== Style of play ==
Mark Yates, speaking after signing Mohamed for Cheltenham Town in June 2011, stated that he possessed "physical strength, pace and power". He retained his pace late into his career. He could play as a winger on either side of the pitch, and could also play as a forward.

== Personal life ==
His grandfather was from Yemen.

== Legal troubles ==
On 21 February 2021, Mohamed and his half-brother were caught with £11,000 worth of cocaine at the house of his recently deceased mother in Cardiff; he was sentenced to 28 months in prison in July 2021. In October 2023, he was sentenced to eleven years and six months in prison for conspiracy to supply class A cocaine.

== Career statistics ==
Appearances and goals by club, season and competition
Club	Season	League			National cup (Note: Includes Welsh Cup, FA Cup)		League cup (Note: Includes Welsh League Cup, Football League Cup)		Other		Total	
Club	Season	Division	Apps	Goals	Apps	Goals	Apps	Goals	Apps	Goals	Apps	Goals
Cwmbrân Town	2003–04	Welsh Premier League	29	3	0	0	0	0	0	0	29	3
Cwmbrân Town	2004–05	Welsh Premier League	15	2	0	0	0	0	0	0	15	2
Cwmbrân Town	2005–06	Welsh Premier League	11	7	0	0	0	0	0	0	11	7
Cwmbrân Town	Total		55	12	0	0	0	0	0	0	55	12
Llanelli	2004–05	Welsh Premier League	3	1	0	0	0	0	0	0	3	1
Llanelli	2005–06	Welsh Premier League	5	0	0	0	0	0	0	0	5	0
Llanelli	Total		8	1	0	0	0	0	0	0	8	1
Cwmbrân Town	2005–06	Welsh Premier League	11	7	0	0	0	0	0	0	11	7
Carmarthen Town	2005–06	Welsh Premier League	14	4	0	0	0	0	0	0	14	4
Carmarthen Town	2006–07	Welsh Premier League	30	15	0	0	0	0	0	0	30	15
Carmarthen Town	Total		44	19	0	0	0	0	0	0	44	19
Swindon Town	2007–08	League One	11	0	1	0	0	0	2 (Note: Appearance(s) in the Football League Trophy.)	0	14	0
Torquay United (loan)	2007–08	Conference Premier	10	2	0	0	—		0	0	10	2
Forest Green Rovers	2008–09	Conference Premier	27	3	3	1	—		0	0	30	4
Newport County (loan)	2008–09	Conference South	1	0	0	0	—		0	0	1	0
Bath City	2009–10	Conference South	31	13	2	0	—		2 (Note: Appearance(s) in the FA Trophy.)	0	35	13
Bath City	2010–11	Conference Premier	34	13	0	0	—		0	0	34	13
Bath City	Total		65	26	2	0	0	0	2	0	69	26
AFC Wimbledon	2010–11	Conference Premier	7	1	0	0	—		3 (Note: Appearance(s) in the play-offs.)	4	10	5
Cheltenham Town	2011–12	League Two	45	11	3	0	1	0	4 (Note: 1 appearance in the Football League Trophy and 3 appearances in the play-offs.)	0	53	11
Cheltenham Town	2012–13	League Two	39	4	4	2	1	1	3 (Note: 1 appearance in the Football League Trophy and 2 appearances in the play-offs.)	0	47	7
Cheltenham Town	Total		84	15	7	2	2	1	7	0	100	18
Port Vale	2013–14	League One	6	0	0	0	1	0	1	0	8	0
Port Vale	2014–15	League One	0	0	0	0	0	0	0	0	0	0
Port Vale	Total		6	0	0	0	1	0	1	0	8	0
AFC Wimbledon (loan)	2013–14	League Two	5	0	0	0	0	0	0	0	5	0
Bristol Rovers (loan)	2013–14	League Two	21	3	—		—		—		21	3
Northampton Town (loan)	2014–15	League Two	23	4	1	0	2	0	2	1	28	5
Port Talbot Town	2015–16	Welsh Premier League	4	1	0	0	0	0	0	0	4	1
Accrington Stanley	2015–16	League Two	3	0	0	0	—		—		3	0
Bath City	2015–16	National League South	8	3	0	0	—		0	0	8	3
Eastleigh	2015–16	National League	5	0	2	1	—		0	0	7	1
Tamworth (loan)	2015–16	National League North	9	3	0	0	—		0	0	9	3
Kettering Town	2016–17	Southern League; Premier Division	12	0	0	0	—		0	0	12	0
Weston-super-Mare	2016–17	National League South	3	0	0	0	—		0	0	3	0
Wealdstone	2017–18	National League South	2	0	0	0	—		0	0	2	0
Bath City	2017–18	National League South	1	0	1	0	—		0	0	2	0
Chippenham Town	2017–18	National League South	9	0	0	0	—		0	0	9	0
Chippenham Town	2018–19	National League South	0	0	0	0	—		0	0	0	0
Chippenham Town	Total		9	0	0	0	0	0	0	0	9	0
Haverfordwest County	2018–19	Welsh Division One	3	1	2	0	—		1	0	6	1
Career total			437	101	19	4	5	1	18	5	479	111

== Honours ==
Carmarthen Town

- Welsh Cup: 2006–07

Bath City

- Conference South play-offs: 2009–10

AFC Wimbledon

- Conference Premier play-offs: 2010–11
