= Bagasan Graham =

English footballer (born 1992)

Personal information
- Full name: Bagasan Assigi Graham
- Date of birth: 6 October 1992 (age 34)
- Place of birth: Plaistow, England
- Height: 5 ft 11 in (1.80 m)
- Position: Defender

Team information
- Current team: Sittingbourne

Youth career
- 2002–2010: Queens Park Rangers

Senior career*
| Years | Team | Apps | (Gls) |
| 2010–2011 | Queens Park Rangers | 0 | (0) |
| 2011 | → Boreham Wood (loan) | 1 | (0) |
| 2011–2013 | Cheltenham Town | 8 | (0) |
| 2012–2013 | → Gloucester City (loan) | 4 | (1) |
| 2013 | → AFC Telford United (loan) | 6 | (0) |
| 2013–2014 | Chelmsford City | 23 | (1) |
| 2014–2015 | Dulwich Hamlet | 7 | (1) |
| 2015–2017 | Chelmsford City | 68 | (5) |
| 2017–2019 | Ebbsfleet United | 30 | (2) |
| 2017–2018 | → Chelmsford City (loan) | 19 | (1) |
| 2019–2020 | Dagenham & Redbridge | 21 | (0) |
| 2020–2021 | Romford | 8 | (2) |
| 2021 | Dartford | 1 | (0) |
| 2021–2022 | Billericay Town | 21 | (0) |
| 2022– | Sittingbourne | 30 | (0) |
- * Club domestic league appearances and goals as of 08:10, 12 June 2023 (UTC)

Bagasan Assigi Graham (born 6 October 1992 in Plaistow, London Borough of Newham, England) is an English footballer who plays for Sittingbourne.

== Career ==
Graham progressed through the Queens Park Rangers youth ranks. He made the switch to Football League Two side Cheltenham Town on a two-year contract. He made his professional debut on 16 August 2011, in the Football League Two 2–1 defeat to Morecambe at Whaddon Road. He came on as a second-half substitute for Josh Low.

He joined AFC Telford United on loan in February 2013 for an initial month-long period. It was announced that Graham would stay at Telford until the end of the season. On 17 May 2013 his contract expired. Graham then moved onto Chelmsford City in August 2013.

After one season with Chelmsford City, making 24 appearances in all competitions, he joined Dulwich Hamlet of the Isthmian League Premier Division in August 2014, with the signing being funded by the Dulwich Hamlet 12th Man scheme, scoring on his debut against Billericay Town.

Graham re-joined Chelmsford City and went on to have a successful season, making 43 appearances in all competitions and going on to score three goals and getting six assists. After the season finished he picked up the 'Young Player of The Year' award. Manager Rod Stringer announced he would be signing a new one-year contract for the 2016–17 season. Graham picked up his first goal of the season against Ebbsfleet United also picking up the Man of the match award.

Graham signed for Ebbsfleet United on 26 June 2017 after impressing in the play-off final against the club. On 29 November 2017, Graham returned to Chelmsford City on an initial one-month loan deal. On 1 January 2018, Chelmsford City extended Graham's loan deal until the end of the season. On 6 June 2019, he signed for National League side Dagenham & Redbridge on a one-year deal. In September 2020, Graham signed for Isthmian League North Division club Romford.

On 8 June 2021, Graham signed for Dartford ahead of the 2021–22 National League South season.

On 24 September 2021, Graham signed for Billericay Town.

On 12 June 2022, Graham joined Sittingbourne.

== Career statistics ==
As of match played 22 April 2023

Appearances and goals by club, season and competition
| Club | Season | League | | | FA Cup | | League Cup | | Other | | Total | |
| Club | Season | Division | Apps | Goals | Apps | Goals | Apps | Goals | Apps | Goals | Apps | Goals |
|---|---|---|---|---|---|---|---|---|---|---|---|---|
| Queens Park Rangers | 2010–11 | Championship | 0 | 0 | 0 | 0 | 0 | 0 | — | | 0 | 0 |
| Boreham Wood (loan) | 2010–11 | Conference South | 1 | 0 | 0 | 0 | — | | 0 | 0 | 1 | 0 |
| Cheltenham Town | 2011–12 | League Two | 7 | 0 | 0 | 0 | 0 | 0 | 3 (Note: Appearances in the Football League Trophy) | 0 | 10 | 0 |
| Cheltenham Town | 2012–13 | League Two | 1 | 0 | 0 | 0 | 0 | 0 | 0 | 0 | 1 | 0 |
| Cheltenham Town | Total | | 8 | 0 | 0 | 0 | 0 | 0 | 3 | 0 | 11 | 0 |
| Gloucester City (loan) | 2012–13 | Conference North | 4 | 1 | — | | — | | — | | 4 | 1 |
| AFC Telford United (loan) | 2012–13 | Conference Premier | 6 | 0 | — | | — | | — | | 6 | 0 |
| Chelmsford City | 2013–14 | Conference South | 23 | 1 | 1 | 0 | — | | 1 (Note: Appearances in FA Trophy) | 0 | 25 | 1 |
| Dulwich Hamlet | 2014–15 | IL Premier Division | 7 | 1 | 0 | 0 | — | | 0 | 0 | 7 | 1 |
| Chelmsford City | 2015–16 | National League South | 37 | 3 | 2 | 0 | — | | 3 | 0 | 42 | 3 |
| Chelmsford City | 2016–17 | National League South | 31 | 2 | 1 | 0 | — | | 6 (Note: Two appearances and one goal in National League South play-offs, four in FA Trophy) | 1 | 38 | 3 |
| Chelmsford City | Total | | 68 | 5 | 3 | 0 | — | | 9 | 1 | 80 | 6 |
| Ebbsfleet United | 2017–18 | National League | 5 | 0 | 0 | 0 | — | | 0 | 0 | 5 | 0 |
| Ebbsfleet United | 2018–19 | National League | 25 | 2 | 1 | 0 | — | | 1 | 0 | 27 | 2 |
| Ebbsfleet United | Total | | 30 | 2 | 1 | 0 | — | | 1 | 0 | 32 | 2 |
| Chelmsford City (loan) | 2017–18 | National League South | 19 | 1 | — | | — | | 1 (Note: Appearance in National League South play-offs) | 0 | 20 | 1 |
| Dagenham & Redbridge | 2019–20 | National League | 21 | 0 | 0 | 0 | — | | 3 | 0 | 24 | 0 |
| Romford | 2020–21 | IL North Division | 8 | 2 | 0 | 0 | — | | 0 | 0 | 8 | 2 |
| Dartford | 2021–22 | National League South | 1 | 0 | 0 | 0 | — | | 0 | 0 | 1 | 0 |
| Billericay Town | 2021–22 | National League South | 21 | 0 | 1 | 0 | — | | 1 (Note: Appearances in the Essex Senior Cup) | 0 | 23 | 0 |
| Sittingbourne | 2022–23 | IL South East Division | 30 | 0 | 1 | 0 | — | | 3 (Note: Two appearances and one goal in the FA Trophy & one appearance in the Velocity Cup) | 1 | 34 | 1 |
| Career total | | | 247 | 13 | 7 | 0 | 0 | 0 | 22 | 2 | 276 | 15 |

== Honours ==
Billericay Town

- Essex Senior Cup: 2021–22
