= Alan Bennett (footballer, born 1981) =

Irish footballer

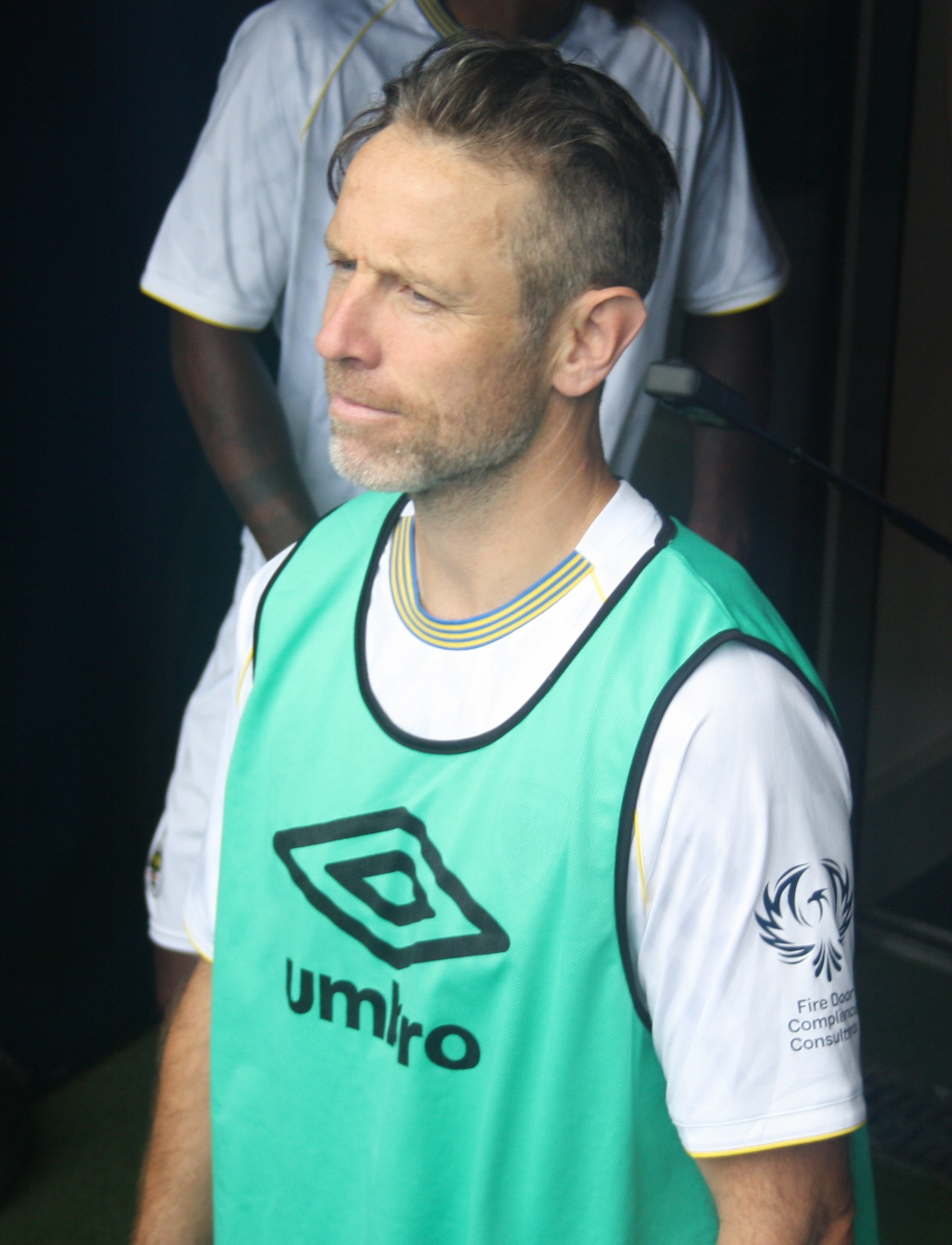
- Bennett in 2025.

Personal information
- Full name: Alan John Bennett
- Date of birth: 4 October 1981 (age 45)
- Place of birth: Cork, Ireland
- Height: 6 ft 2 in (1.88 m)
- Position: Centre back

Youth career
- ?–2000: Richmond

Senior career*
Years	Team	Apps	(Gls)
2000–2006	Cork City	161	(10)
2007–2009	Reading	0	(0)
2007–2008	→ Southampton (loan)	10	(0)
2008	→ Brentford (loan)	11	(1)
2008–2009	→ Brentford (loan)	44	(1)
2009–2010	Brentford	13	(0)
2010	→ Wycombe Wanderers (loan)	6	(1)
2010–2011	Wycombe Wanderers	17	(0)
2011–2013	Cheltenham Town	61	(2)
2013–2014	AFC Wimbledon	66	(2)
2015–2020	Cork City	101	(4)
Total		490	(21)

International career
2001	Republic of Ireland U21	1	(0)
2007	Republic of Ireland B	1	(0)
2007	Republic of Ireland	2	(0)
- * Club domestic league appearances and goals

Alan John Bennett (born 4 October 1981) is an Irish former professional footballer who played as a defender. He has represented the Republic of Ireland national team.

== Club career ==
=== Cork City ===
Bennett was born in Cork, Ireland on 4 October 1981. He began his footballing career at his local club Richmond, based in Waterfall, County Cork, which competes in the West Cork League. He was coached by highly regarded coach Colm Donovan. Bennett subsequently joined League of Ireland Premier Division club Cork City in 2000 at the age of 18. He initially played as a midfielder, but was converted to the defensive role of centre-back during the 2004 season. He made more than 150 appearances for the "Rebel Army", scoring ten goals. During his time at Cork City, Bennett played in The UEFA Cup and Champions league and also won a FAI Youth Cup medal in 2000, National league Medal in 2005 and 3 Munster Senior Cup medals.

=== Reading ===
Following several bids, Bennett joined Reading on a two-and-a-half-year contract for an undisclosed fee thought to be £250,000 on 30 January 2007.

On 31 July 2007, he was loaned for six months to Southampton and made his debut during a home defeat to Crystal Palace. He returned to Reading in January 2008. On 7 March 2008, he joined Brentford on loan during this time Bennett scored his first goal in English football against Bradford City.

On 28 July 2008, Bennett was told that he did not feature in Reading's plans and was told to find a new club. He began a second loan spell at Brentford on 8 August 2008, initially for one month, although this was extended to five months on 31 August 2008, following Man-of-the-Match performances against Rotherham United and Notts County. His loan was then extended for a third time until the end of the 2008–09 season. Bennett appeared in over 50 games for Brentford in the 2008–09 season and assumed the role of team captain in the absence of regular captain Kevin O'Connor. As O'Connor was out for the match that decided if they won the league or not Bennett was made captain and lifted the League Two trophy after a 3–1 victory over Darlington. Bennett scored the opening goal in this fixture. At the end of the 2008–09 season, Bennett was released by Reading.

=== Brentford ===
He signed a permanent contract with Brentford on 30 July 2009 which was set to run until June 2011 and was appointed club captain.

On 16 February 2010 Bennett joined Wycombe Wanderers on a one-month emergency loan. He returned to Brentford at the end of the loan period because of the Bees' lack of defensive cover, but signed a new loan deal with Wycombe until the end of the season on 25 March 2010. One week later, before he had made any further appearances for the club, he sustained an ankle injury that looked to have ruled him out for the rest of the season and he returned to Brentford for treatment. However, he recovered quicker than expected and returned to training at Wycombe in late April. He returned to the team for the final game of the season against Gillingham, scoring his first goal for the club during this match.

=== Wycombe Wanderers ===
On 23 July 2010 Bennett joined Wycombe Wanderers on a permanent one-year contract. Bennett was part of the Wycombe squad that achieved automatic promotion to League One that year, unfortunately injuries limited his appearances.

=== Cheltenham Town ===
On 4 July 2011 Bennett joined Cheltenham Town on a one-year contract. Bennett was made captain of Cheltenham by manager Mark Yates shortly after his arrival. Bennett formed an excellent defensive partnership with Steve Elliott that saw Cheltenham spend much of the season chasing automatic promotion. Bennett played a big part in Cheltenham reaching the 3rd round of the FA Cup which drew them away to Tottenham Hostspur. They went on to lose 3–0; however, the game will go down as one of the biggest days in the club's history. Cheltenham's form suffered after the FA Cup game but they still managed to seal a League Two play-off position under Bennett's captaincy. Cheltenham went on to beat Torquay United in the play-off semi-finals, but lose the play-off final to Crewe Alexandra, thus confirming another season in League Two. On 31 January 2013, Bennett left Cheltenham after his contract was terminated by mutual consent.

=== AFC Wimbledon ===
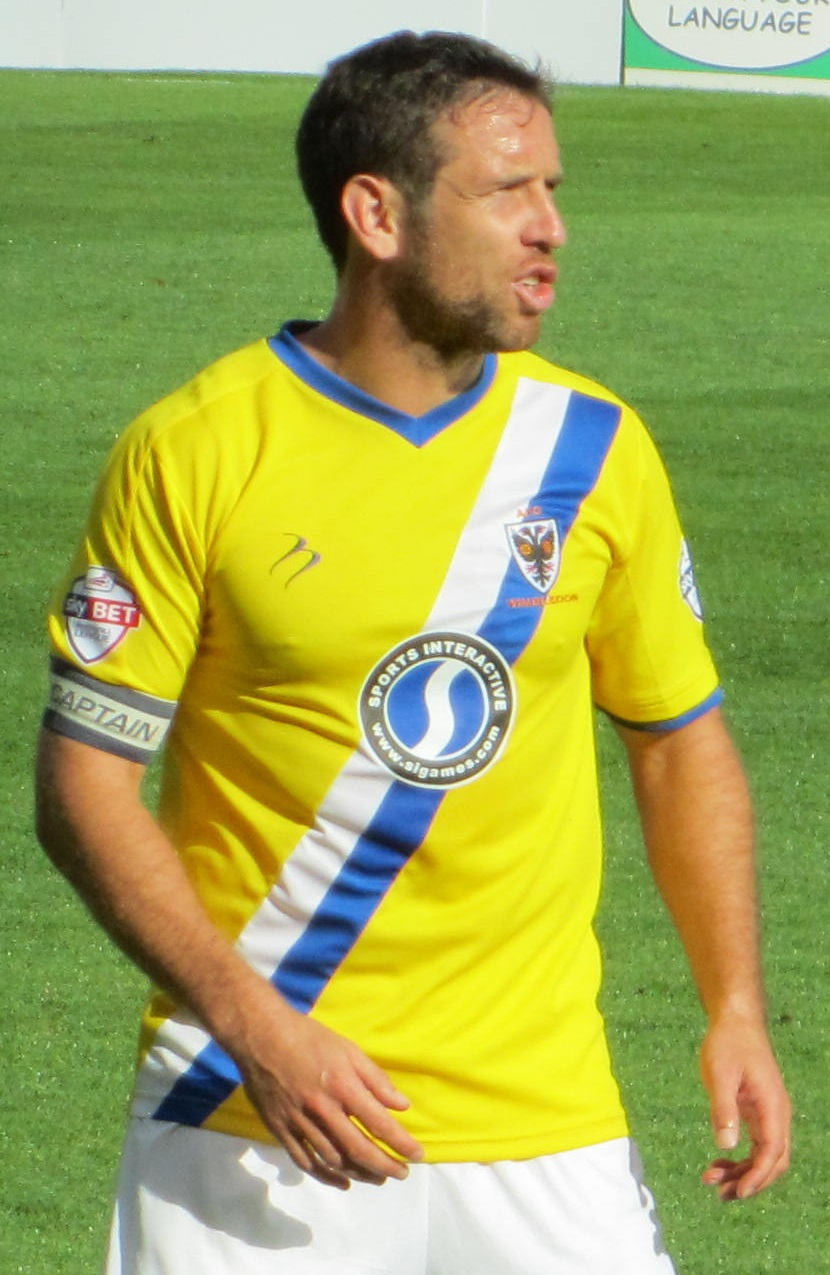
Bennett playing as captain for AFC Wimbledon in 2013

Following his contract termination, he signed for fellow League Two team AFC Wimbledon also on 31 January 2013. The ability and experience Bennett brought to the AFC Wimbledon defence in the second half of the 2012–13 season helped "The Dons" avoid relegation from the Football League and remain a League Two team for a third successive season.

=== Cork City ===
On 6 February 2015, Bennett returned to his home-town club, Cork City He scored City's first goal in European Competition since 2007 in their opening game against KR Reykjavik on 2 July 2015. On his return he has won the 2016 Presidents Cup and the FAI Cup both against Dundalk On 5 November 2017, Cork City captained by Bennett completed the league and cup double after defeating Dundalk in the 2017 FAI Cup Final.

Bennett announced his retirement on 10 November 2020.

== International career ==
Bennett received a call up for the Republic of Ireland under-21 team in 2001. In 2007 Bennett was called up to the Ireland 'B' squad for a game against Scotland 'B' in Airdrie.

In May 2007, he was called up to the full Republic of Ireland team for their two match trip to the United States. Bennett played the full 90 minutes against Ecuador, helping Ireland to a 1–1 draw. He then played in the following match against Bolivia, which also ended 1–1, during which he made a saving tackle to keep the Bolivian team from going ahead.

== Career statistics ==
Appearances and goals by club, season and competition
Club	Season	League			FA Cup		League Cup		Other		Total	
Club	Season	Division	Apps	Goals	Apps	Goals	Apps	Goals	Apps	Goals	Apps	Goals
Reading	2006–07	Premier League	0	0	0	0	0	0	—		0	0
Reading	Total		0	0	0	0	0	0	0	0	0	0
Southampton (loan)	2007–08	Championship	10	0	0	0	1	0	—		11	0
Southampton (loan)	Total		10	0	0	0	1	0	0	0	11	0
Brentford (loan)
Brentford (loan)	2007–08	League Two	11	1	0	0	—		—		11	1
Brentford (loan)	2008–09	League Two	44	1	2	0	1	0	—		47	1
Brentford	2009–10	League One	13	0	3	0	1	0	—		17	0
Brentford	Total		68	2	5	0	2	0	0	0	75	2
Wycombe Wanderers (loan)	2009–10	League One	6	1	0	0	0	0	—		6	1
Wycombe Wanderers	2010–11	League Two	17	0	1	0	1	0	1 (Note: Appearances in Football League Trophy)	0	20	0
Wycombe Wanderers	Total		23	1	1	0	1	0	1	0	26	1
Cheltenham Town
Cheltenham Town	2011–12	League Two	44	2	3	0	1	0	3 (Note: Appearances in 2012 play-offs)	0	0	0
Cheltenham Town	2012–13	League Two	17	0	4	0	1	0	—		22	0
Cheltenham Town	Total		61	2	7	0	2	0	3	0	73	2
Wimbledon
Wimbledon	2012–13	League Two	18	1	—		—		—		18	1
Wimbledon	2013–14	League Two	32	1	1	0	1	0	—		34	1
Wimbledon	2014–15	League Two	16	0	2	0	1	0	1	0	20	0
Wimbledon	Total		66	2	3	0	2	0	1	0	72	2
Cork City
Cork City	2015	Irish Premier Division	23	2	4 (Note: Appearances in FAI Cup)	0	0	0	4 (Note: Appearances in Europa League (2 appearances, 1 goal) and Munster Senior Cup (2 appearances))	1	31	3
Cork City	2016	Irish Premier Division	27	2	4	1	0	0	8 (Note: Appearances in Europa League (6 appearances, 1 goal), Munster Senior Cup (1 appearance) and President's Cup (1 appearance))	1	39	4
Cork City	2017	Irish Premier Division	24	0	2	0	1 (Note: Appearances in Irish League Cup)	0	—		27	0
Cork City	2018	Irish Premier Division	12	0	5	0	0	0	1 (Note: Appearances in President's Cup)	0	18	0
Cork City	2019	Irish Premier Division	7	0	1	0	1	0	2 (Note: Appearances in Munster Senior Cup)	1	11	1
Cork City	2020	Irish Premier Division	8	0	1	0	0	0	1	0	10	0
Cork City	Total		101	4	17	1	2	0	16	3	136	8
Career total			329	11	33	1	10	0	21	3	393	15

== Honours ==
Cork City

- League of Ireland Premier Division: 2005, 2017
- FAI Cup: 2016, 2017

Brentford

- Football League Two: 2008–09

Wycombe Wanderers

- Football League Two third-place promotion: 2010–11
