= Craig Pawson =

English football referee (born 1979)

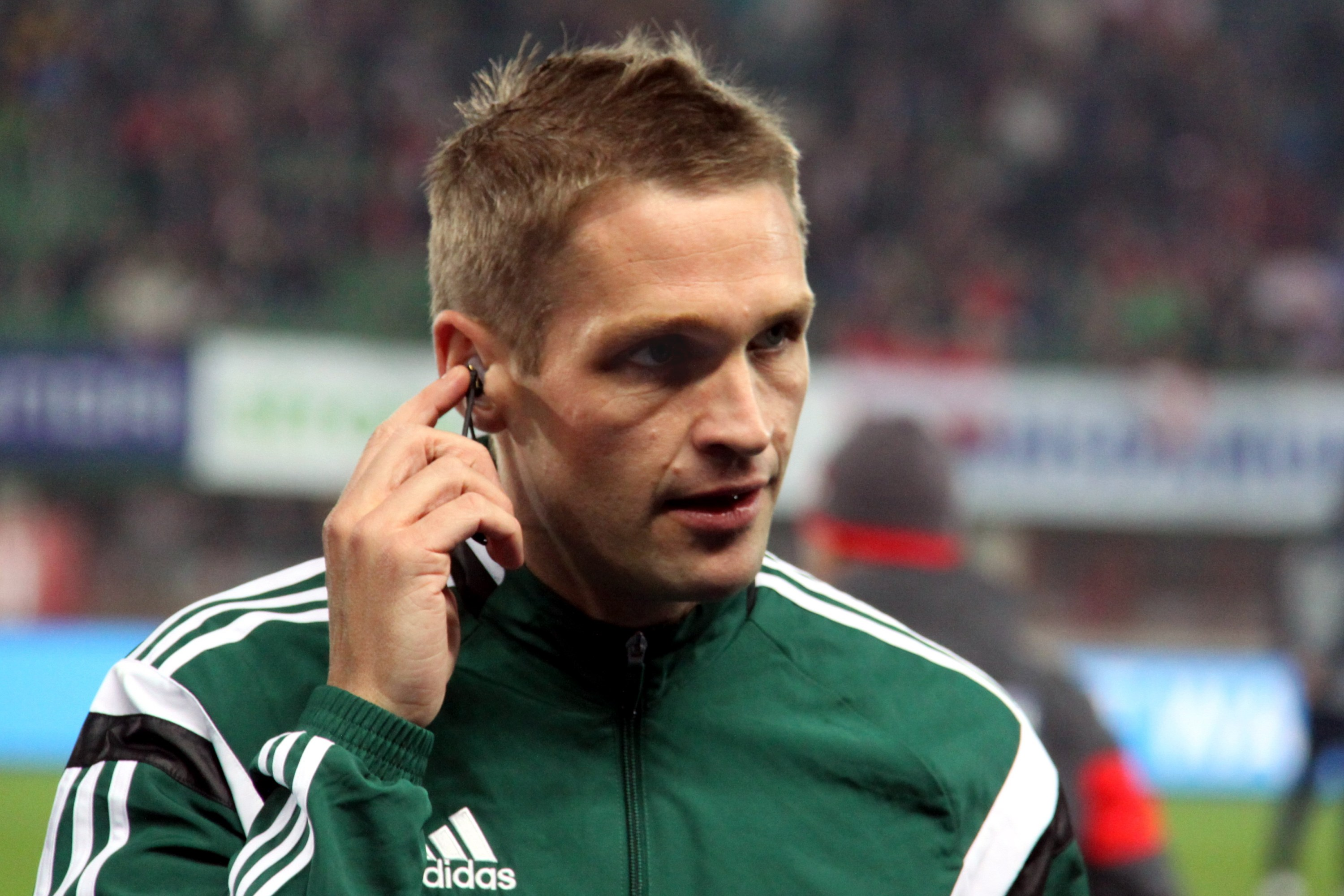
- Pawson in 2014
- Full name: Craig Pawson
- Born: 2 March 1979 (age 47)

Domestic
Years	League	Role
?	Football League	Assistant referee
2008–2013	Football League	Referee
2013–	Premier League	Referee

International
Years	League	Role
2015–2024	FIFA listed	Referee

Craig Pawson (born 2 March 1979) is an English professional football referee who officiates primarily in the Premier League, having been promoted to the panel of Select Group Referees in 2013, as well as in the Football League.

He is based in South Yorkshire and is associated with the Sheffield & Hallamshire County Football Association and the RNIB.

== Career ==
Pawson has been a referee since 1993.

Pawson regularly officiated in the Football League in the 2012–13 season. He appeared 12 times in the Championship as well as making a Wembley appearance, taking charge of the League 2 play-off final between Crewe Alexandra and Cheltenham Town, which saw the former promoted.

His first Premier League appointment came in March 2013 between Swansea City and Newcastle United at the Liberty Stadium with the home side winning 1–0.

Pawson was appointed as fourth official for the FA Cup semi-final in April 2014 between Wigan Athletic and Arsenal at Wembley.

In 2015 Pawson was put on the FIFA International Referees List meaning that he can officiate in international fixtures, as well as UEFA Champions League and UEFA Europa League fixtures as either referee or an additional assistant referee. Pawson became the seventh referee from England on the list.

He was the fourth official for the 2015 Football League Cup Final at Wembley, in which Chelsea defeated Tottenham Hotspur 2–0.

Pawson was the fourth official for the 2015 FA Cup Final between Arsenal and Aston Villa on 30 May.

In May 2019 Pawson officiated the Championship playoff semifinal between Derby County and Leeds United. This was considered an especially high-profile game after the Spygate affair earlier in the season for which Leeds were fined £200,000 and severely reprimanded by the EFL. The game was controversial with Pawson awarding Derby a penalty in the second half, before reversing his decision on the advice of his assistant. Leeds went on to win the game 0–1.

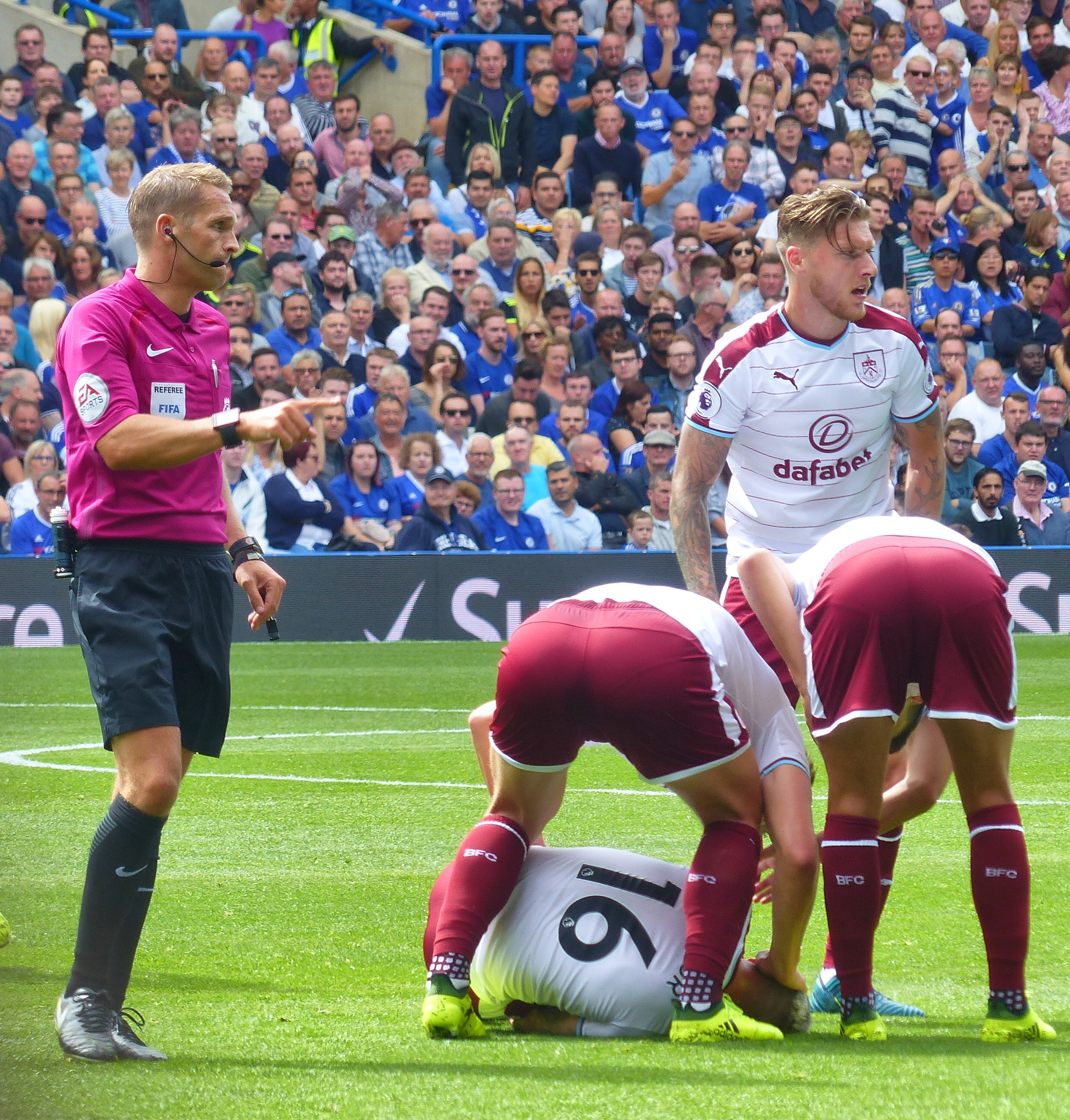
Referee Craig Pawson takes charge of Chelsea v Burnley at Stamford Bridge, August 2017

Pawson stepped down as a FIFA official at the end of December 2024.
