= Harry Hooman =

English footballer (born 1991)

Personal information
- Full name: Harry James Hooman
- Date of birth: 27 April 1991 (age 35)
- Place of birth: Worcester, England
- Position: Defender

Youth career
- –2009: Shrewsbury Town

Senior career*
Years	Team	Apps	(Gls)
2009–2011	Shrewsbury Town	2	(0)
2010–2011	→ Hinckley United (loan)	12	(1)
2011–2013	Cheltenham Town	6	(0)
2012	→ Bath City (Loan)	5	(0)
2012	Inverness Caledonian Thistle	0	(0)
Total		25	(1)
- * Club domestic league appearances and goals as of 03:37, 14 April 2016 (UTC)

Harry James Hooman (born 27 April 1991) is an English former footballer who played as a defender.

== Playing career ==
Hooman came through the youth ranks at Shrewsbury Town and signed his first professional contract with the club at the beginning of the 2009/10 season. He made his debut at the age of only 18 against Northampton Town, playing in his team's 3–0 win.

In November 2010, then 19-year-old Hooman was loaned to Conference North side Hinckley United to gain further first-team experience and became a regular during his loan spell at the club.

In July 2011 Hooman signed for Cheltenham Town. Having played 7 times for Cheltenham in the 2011–12 season, 21-year-old Hooman signed a new one-year deal with the club in June 2012.

Hooman became a regular in the Cheltenham starting line-up towards the start of the 2012–13 season, keeping club captain Steve Elliott out of the side. As a result, Hooman won the club's player of the month award for August 2012 and manager Mark Yates described Hooman as "outstanding" and said "he's been a big part of our good start to the season and the shirt is his". Unfortunately, Hooman suffered a foot injury during a match in October 2012 and having undergone surgery on it, remained sidelined for the remainder of the season.

Hooman was released by Cheltenham Town in May 2013.

It was announced that Harry would join Inverness Caledonian Thistle for the start of the 2013–2014 season. Unfortunately, a persistent foot injury flared-up in pre-season training resulting in Hooman being released only days after signing for the club. However, Inverness manager Terry Butcher stated that there may be an opportunity for the player to return in the future. However, he was forced into retirement aged just 23 due to constant injuries.

== Personal life ==
He graduated from Manchester Metropolitan University in July 2016 with a bachelor's degree in Sports Science.
