= Josh Low =

Footballer (born 1979)

Personal information
- Full name: Joshua David Low
- Date of birth: 15 February 1979 (age 47)
- Place of birth: Bristol, England
- Height: 6 ft 2 in (1.88 m)
- Position: Midfielder

Senior career*
Years	Team	Apps	(Gls)
1995–1999	Bristol Rovers	22	(0)
1998	→ Farnborough Town (loan)	6	(2)
1999	Leyton Orient	5	(1)
1999	→ Cardiff City (loan)	2	(0)
1999–2002	Cardiff City	73	(6)
2002–2003	Oldham Athletic	21	(3)
2003–2006	Northampton Town	102	(15)
2006–2007	Leicester City	16	(0)
2007–2008	Peterborough United	34	(3)
2008–2012	Cheltenham Town	121	(14)
2008	→ Forest Green Rovers (loan)	4	(0)
2012–2014	Bath City	62	(9)
Total		468	(53)

International career
	Wales U21	4	
- * Club domestic league appearances and goals

Joshua David Low (born 15 February 1979) is a retired professional footballer who played as a midfielder. Born in England, he represented Wales at youth level.

== Career ==
After spells at Bristol Rovers, Farnborough Town and Leyton Orient he made his name at Cardiff City, before being transferred to Oldham Athletic, where he spent one season before becoming Northampton Town's record signing, costing the club £165,000 in July 2003.

Low became a popular figure amongst the Northampton fans, who gave him the nickname J-Lo. Predominantly a right winger, he can also play in defence or central midfield. He scored 5 goals in 29 League Two appearances in the 2005/06 season.

In the summer of 2006, Low was signed by Leicester City manager Rob Kelly, after his contract expired at Northampton.

Low made his debut for the Leicester City first team as a substitute in the 1–0 home defeat to Burnley.

After struggling to adapt to Championship level football, Low was sold to Peterborough United for a fee that could have risen to £100,000, but was released at the end of the 2007–08 season

However, after Cheltenham Town came calling, he quickly moved on, signing a two-year deal with the Robins. After failing to make an impact at his new club, on 23 September, Low was one of six squad members placed on the transfer list by manager Martin Allen.

In November 2008 Low signed on a months loan with Conference National side Forest Green Rovers. He scored in Forest Green's FA Cup second round giant killing of Football League side Rochdale on 29 November 2008. After a month at Forest Green, Low returned to first team action at Cheltenham, eventually featuring in more than 100 games for the club.

In May 2012, Low was released by Cheltenham after the expiry of his contract. He joined part-time Bath City in June 2012 so he could balance playing football with his work in law.

In June 2014, he announced his retirement from football to focus on his professional career outside football.

== Personal life ==
Josh Low is the father of the professional footballer Joe Low and the father of Northwest College commit Cameron Low.

== Honours ==
Individual

- PFA Team of the Year: 2000–01 Third Division, 2005–06 Football League Two
