= Russell Penn =

English footballer (born 1985)

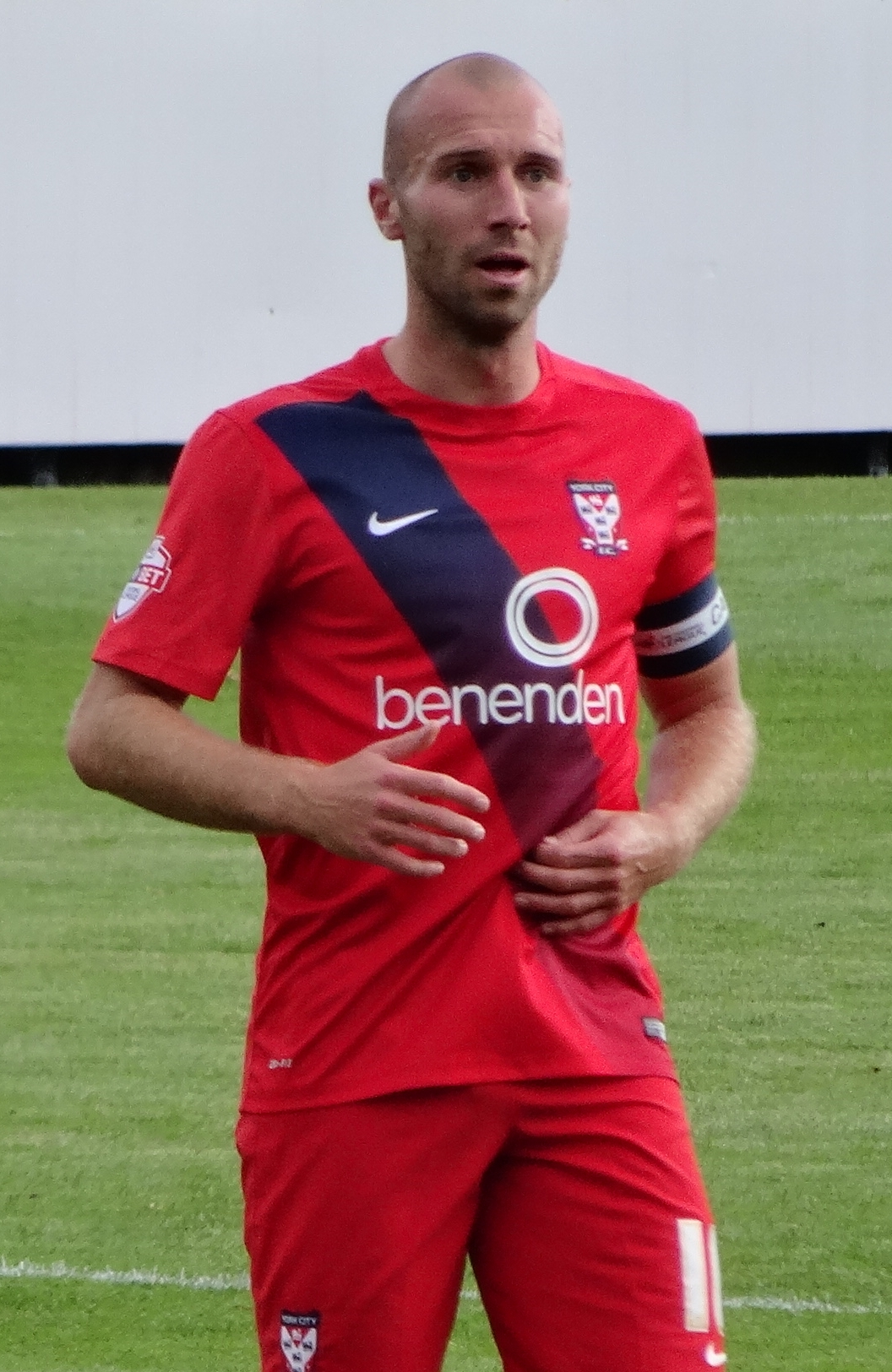
- Penn playing for York City in 2015

Personal information
- Full name: Russell Anthony Penn
- Date of birth: 8 November 1985 (age 40)
- Place of birth: Dudley, England
- Height: 5 ft 11 in (1.80 m)
- Position: Midfielder

Youth career
- 2001–2002: Birmingham City
- 2002: Kidderminster Harriers
- 2002–2003: Scunthorpe United

Senior career*
Years	Team	Apps	(Gls)
2003–2005	Scunthorpe United	0	(0)
2005–2009	Kidderminster Harriers	147	(19)
2005	→ Alvechurch (loan)	4	(1)
2009–2011	Burton Albion	81	(7)
2011–2014	Cheltenham Town	105	(2)
2014–2016	York City	100	(5)
2016–2017	Carlisle United	1	(0)
2016	→ Gateshead (loan)	15	(0)
2017	Wrexham	16	(0)
2017–2018	Gateshead	40	(0)
2018	York City	12	(0)
2018–2019	Kidderminster Harriers	23	(0)
Total		544	(34)

International career
2007–2009	England C	8	(1)

Managerial career
- 2019: Kidderminster Harriers (interim manager)
- 2020–2024: Kidderminster Harriers
- 2024–2026: Halesowen Town
- * Club domestic league appearances and goals

Russell Anthony Penn (born 8 November 1985) is an English former professional footballer who played as a midfielder. He was most recently manager of Halesowen Town.

He was appointed interim manager of National League North club Kidderminster Harriers in 2019 and was appointed as permanent manager in 2020. After guiding his side to promotion via the play-offs, he was sacked from his position in the club in January 2024 with Harriers then bottom of the table, 7 points from safety. On 27 February Penn was announced as the new manager of Halesowen Town, replacing Paul Smith, on a long term deal. This ended on 21 October 2026 when Penn and Halesowen Town parted ways.

== Club career ==
Born in Dudley, West Midlands into a sporting family (his father was a footballer with Halesowen Town and his younger brother Mike became a rugby union professional), Penn began his career at Birmingham City in their youth system in July 2001. He joined the youth system at Kidderminster Harriers in March 2002, and appeared in one youth team match against Wellington on 7 March before joining Scunthorpe United's youth system in July 2002.

He returned to Kidderminster Harriers on a free transfer in the summer of 2005; he had a short spell on loan at Alvechurch before breaking into the Kidderminster team.

Penn joined newly promoted League Two club Burton Albion on 9 July 2009 on a two-year contract, for an undisclosed fee thought to be a club record. He scored his first goal for Burton on 15 August 2009 in a 5–2 win over Morecambe.

Penn signed for League Two club Cheltenham Town on 23 May 2011 on a two-year contract, after he rejected a new contract with Burton. He scored his first goal for Cheltenham in an FA Cup second-round match away at Luton Town in December 2011, followed quickly by his second goal a week later in a home League Two match against Southend United.

On 7 January 2013, Penn turned in a man of the match performance and scored the home team's goal (his third for Cheltenham) in a 5–1 FA Cup third-round defeat at the hands of Premier League team Everton. Following the departure of club captain Alan Bennett in the January 2013 transfer window, Penn was named the new club captain by Cheltenham manager Mark Yates.

Penn signed for Cheltenham's League Two rivals York City on 6 January 2014 on a two-and-a-half-year contract for an undisclosed fee.

Penn turned down a new contract with York to join League Two club Carlisle United on 27 May 2016 on a one-year contract. On 22 September 2016, Penn joined National League club Gateshead on a one-month loan until 25 October, having only made two appearances for Carlisle. On 24 October 2016, the loan was extended until 26 December.

On 13 January 2017, Penn signed for National League club Wrexham on a contract until the end of 2016–17, after leaving Carlisle by mutual consent.

Penn rejoined Gateshead on 11 May 2017 on a one-year contract, after turning down a new contract with Wrexham because of family reasons.

Penn re-signed for National League North club York City on 8 May 2018. Six months later he re-signed for York's National League North rivals Kidderminster Harriers on a free transfer, on a one-and-a-half-year contract.

== Coaching career ==
In November 2019 he served as caretaker manager of Kidderminster for two matches, before being replaced by James Shan, for whom he worked as assistant. When Shan departed to Solihull Moors on 11 February 2020, Penn was made manager of the club. Penn was awarded the National League North Manager of the Month award for November 2021 after three league wins from three as well as success in the FA Cup and FA Trophy. Penn won the award again for January 2022 after winning more points than anyone else across the course of the month as well as defeating Championship side Reading in the FA Cup third round. On 5 February 2022, Penn saw his side take the lead against Premier League side West Ham United before a 91st-minute equaliser from Declan Rice took the game to extra time where Jarrod Bowen scored in the last minute to avoid a massive shock. During the same season, Penn's Harriers side were in the mix for promotion for much of the season, however the team's form dipped during the last couple of months which saw the team's title hopes fade before being beaten 2-1 by Boston United in the Playoffs. The 22/23 season saw Penn's Harriers squad injury hit for sizeable parts of the campaign as they struggled for consistency. Penn bolstered his squad mid season, signing the likes of Christian Dibble, Kyle Morison and Joe Leesley. Harriers form improved greatly, Penn's side then won their last 6 league games, including beating Kettering Town 3-0 on the final day of the season, finishing in the play off positions as a result. Dreams then became a reality as Harriers beat Alfreton 1-0, King's Lynn 4-1 and then Brackley 2-0 to gain promotion back into the Conference. This saw Penn become the first manager at the club to gain promotion since Jan Molby in 2000.

Penn parted company with Harriers in January 2024 with the club bottom of the National League, having won 4 of their 28 league matches. On 27 February 2024 it was announced that Penn was back in football management, this time at Halesowen Town

== International career ==
Penn was capped eight times by England C, scoring one goal, from 2007 to 2009. Having been a regular member of the team for two years, he was named the England C Player of the Year for 2009.

== Career statistics ==
As of end of 2018–19 season

Appearances and goals by club, season and competition
Club	Season	League			FA Cup		League Cup		Other		Total	
Club	Season	Division	Apps	Goals	Apps	Goals	Apps	Goals	Apps	Goals	Apps	Goals
Scunthorpe United	2003–04	Third Division	0	0	0	0	0	0	0	0	0	0
Scunthorpe United	2004–05	League Two	0	0	0	0	0	0	0	0	0	0
Scunthorpe United	Total		0	0	0	0	0	0	0	0	0	0
Kidderminster Harriers	2005–06	Conference National	22	0	0	0	—		5 (Note: Three appearances and one goal in Football League Trophy, two appearances in FA Trophy)	1	27	1
Kidderminster Harriers	2006–07	Conference National	41	5	2	1	—		8 (Note: Appearance(s) in FA Trophy)	1	51	7
Kidderminster Harriers	2007–08	Conference Premier	42	11	3	0	—		5 (Note: Three appearances and one goal in FA Trophy, two appearances in Conference League Cup)	1	50	12
Kidderminster Harriers	2008–09	Conference Premier	42	3	4	1	—		3 (Note: One appearance in Conference League Cup, two appearances and one goal in FA Trophy)	1	49	5
Kidderminster Harriers	Total		147	19	9	2	—		21	4	177	25
Alvechurch (loan)	2005–06	Midland Football Alliance	4	1			—				4	1
Burton Albion	2009–10	League Two	40	4	2	0	1	0	1 (Note: Appearance in Football League Trophy)	0	44	4
Burton Albion	2010–11	League Two	41	3	4	0	1	0	1	0	47	3
Burton Albion	Total		81	7	6	0	2	0	2	0	91	7
Cheltenham Town	2011–12	League Two	43	1	3	1	1	0	3 (Note: One appearance in Football League Trophy, two in League Two play-offs)	0	50	2
Cheltenham Town	2012–13	League Two	43	1	4	1	1	0	3	0	51	2
Cheltenham Town	2013–14	League Two	19	0	1	0	2	0	1	0	23	0
Cheltenham Town	Total		105	2	8	2	4	0	7	0	124	4
York City	2013–14	League Two	21	0	—		—		2 (Note: Appearances in League Two play-offs)	0	23	0
York City	2014–15	League Two	45	2	2	0	1	0	1	0	49	2
York City	2015–16	League Two	34	3	0	0	2	0	1	0	37	3
York City	Total		100	5	2	0	3	0	4	0	109	5
Carlisle United	2016–17	League Two	1	0	—		0	0	1 (Note: Appearance in EFL Trophy)	0	2	0
Gateshead (loan)	2016–17	National League	15	0	—		—		1	0	16	0
Wrexham	2016–17	National League	16	0	—		—		—		16	0
Gateshead	2017–18	National League	40	0	2	0	—		9	0	51	0
York City	2018–19	National League North	12	0	3	0	—		—		15	0
Kidderminster Harriers	2018–19	National League North	23	0	—		—		1	0	24	0
Career total			544	34	30	4	9	0	46	4	629	42

== Managerial statistics ==
As of 29 April 2026

Managerial record by team and tenure
Team	Nat	From	To	Record					Ref
Team	Nat	From	To	G	W	D	L	Win %	Ref
Kidderminster Harriers (interim manager)	(England)	27 November 2019	6 December 2019	2	0	1	1	0.00	
Kidderminster Harriers	(England)	11 February 2020	7 January 2024	161	67	41	53	41.61	
Halesowen Town	(England)	27 February 2024	21 October 2026	110	55	23	32	50.00	
Total				273	122	65	86	44.69	—
