= Brian Smikle =

English footballer

Personal information
- Full name: Brian Junior Smikle
- Date of birth: 3 November 1985 (age 41)
- Place of birth: Tipton, England
- Position: Midfielder

Team information
- Current team: Gresley F.C.

Youth career
- West Bromwich Albion

Senior career*
| Years | Team | Apps | (Gls) |
| 2004–2006 | West Bromwich Albion | 0 | (0) |
| 2005 | → Hereford United (loan) | 3 | (0) |
| 2006–2010 | Kidderminster Harriers | 137 | (21) |
| 2010–2012 | Cheltenham Town | 81 | (5) |
| 2012–2013 | Hereford United | 24 | (1) |
| 2013–2014 | Altrincham | 12 | (1) |
| 2014 | → Stafford Rangers (loan) | 3 | (0) |
| 2014–2017 | Stourbridge | | |
| 2017 | Rushall Olympic | | |
| 2017 | Sutton Coldfield | | |
| 2017–2019 | Rushall Olympic | | |
| 2019– | Evesham United | | |
| 2020– | Gresley F.C. | | |
- * Club domestic league appearances and goals

Brian Junior Smikle (born 3 November 1985) is an English footballer who plays for Gresley F.C., where he plays as a midfielder.

== Playing career ==
=== West Bromwich Albion ===
A product of West Bromwich Albion's youth system. He signed a professional contract in the summer of 2005, however in February 2005 he had a short loan spell at Hereford United, where he made 6 appearances and scored 1 goal. Smikle was loaned to Hereford United during the 2005–06 season.

=== Kidderminster Harriers ===
In May 2006, West Bromwich Albion announced that Smikle's contract, which expired in June, would not be renewed. He left the Baggies without having played a competitive game for the club. Late in July 2006, he signed for Kidderminster Harriers where he stayed until May 2010.

=== Cheltenham Town ===
Smikle signed for Cheltenham Town in 2010 on a one-year contract, making his debut on 7 August in a 1–1 draw against Gillingham. In his first full season with the Robins Smikle played in all 46 League Two matches. In May 2012, Smikle was released by Cheltenham after the expiry of his contract.

=== Hereford United ===
Smikle joined Hereford United on non-contract terms on 25 August 2012. But after struggling to establish himself at Edgar Street he was released at the end of the season.

=== Altrincham ===
Following a brief trial with Tamworth, Smikle signed for Conference North side Altrincham on 12 August 2013.

=== Stourbridge ===
Following his departure from Altrincham, Smikle Joined Northern Premier League side Stourbridge in March 2014.

=== Sutton Coldfield Town ===
On 9 June 2017, Smikle joined Sutton Coldfield Town.

=== Rushall Olympic ===
On 2 December 2017, Smilke resigned for Rushall Olympic from Sutton Coldfield Town.

=== Evesham United ===
On 24 June 2019, Smilke joined Evesham United.
