= Jeff Goulding =

English footballer (born 1984)

Personal information
- Full name: Jeff Colin Goulding
- Date of birth: 13 May 1984 (age 42)
- Place of birth: Sutton, England
- Height: 1.88 m (6 ft 2 in)
- Position: Forward

Youth career
- Reading
- Crystal Palace

Senior career*
| Years | Team | Apps | (Gls) |
| 2001–2002 | Molesey | 5 | (0) |
| 2002 | Croydon | 21 | (0) |
| 2002–2003 | Clapton | 22 | (8) |
| 2003–2005 | Egham Town | 19 | (8) |
| 2005 | Croydon | 5 | (1) |
| 2005–2006 | Hayes | 24 | (8) |
| 2006–2007 | Yeading | 27 | (9) |
| 2007–2008 | Fisher Athletic | 40 | (12) |
| 2008 | → Grays Athletic (loan) | 9 | (2) |
| 2008–2010 | Bournemouth | 44 | (4) |
| 2008–2009 | → Eastbourne Borough (loan) | 3 | (0) |
| 2010–2013 | Cheltenham Town | 93 | (18) |
| 2013 | Aldershot Town | 11 | (1) |
| 2013–2014 | Chelmsford City | 12 | (3) |
| 2014 | Dover Athletic | 17 | (9) |
| 2016 | Cray Wanderers | 1 | (0) |

International career
| 2008 | England C | 1 | (0) |
- * Club domestic league appearances and goals as of 00:44, 13 January 2014 (UTC)

Jeff Colin Goulding (born 13 May 1984) is an English semi-professional footballer. He has played for non-league clubs Clapton, Croydon, Molesey, Hayes, Yeading, Fisher Athletic, Dover Athletic and Grays Athletic. Goulding has also made 150 appearances in the Football League, the majority of which were with Cheltenham Town.

== Club career ==
Born in Sutton, London, Goulding scored on his début for Bournemouth, at home to Bristol Rovers, in the 3–0 victory in the Football League Trophy on 2 September 2008.

On 26 November, Goulding was signed by Conference team Eastbourne Borough on a loan deal lasting until 1 January 2009. Goulding was released from Bournemouth on 10 May, after scoring just one during the season. On 10 June 2010 he signed for Cheltenham Town, where he was reunited with former Fisher Athletic teammate Wesley Thomas, with whom he formed an effective partnership, scoring 10 goals. Goulding's season was cut short by an ankle injury suffered on 2 April 2011, during an 8–1 defeat against Crewe Alexandra.

On 13 February 2013, he signed for Aldershot Town until the end of the 2012–13 season.

On 26 November 2014, he had his contract cancelled by mutual consent by Dover Athletic having not featured in the 2014–15 season.

He made one appearance as a substitute for Cray Wanderers in February 2016.
