= Darryl Duffy =

Scottish footballer

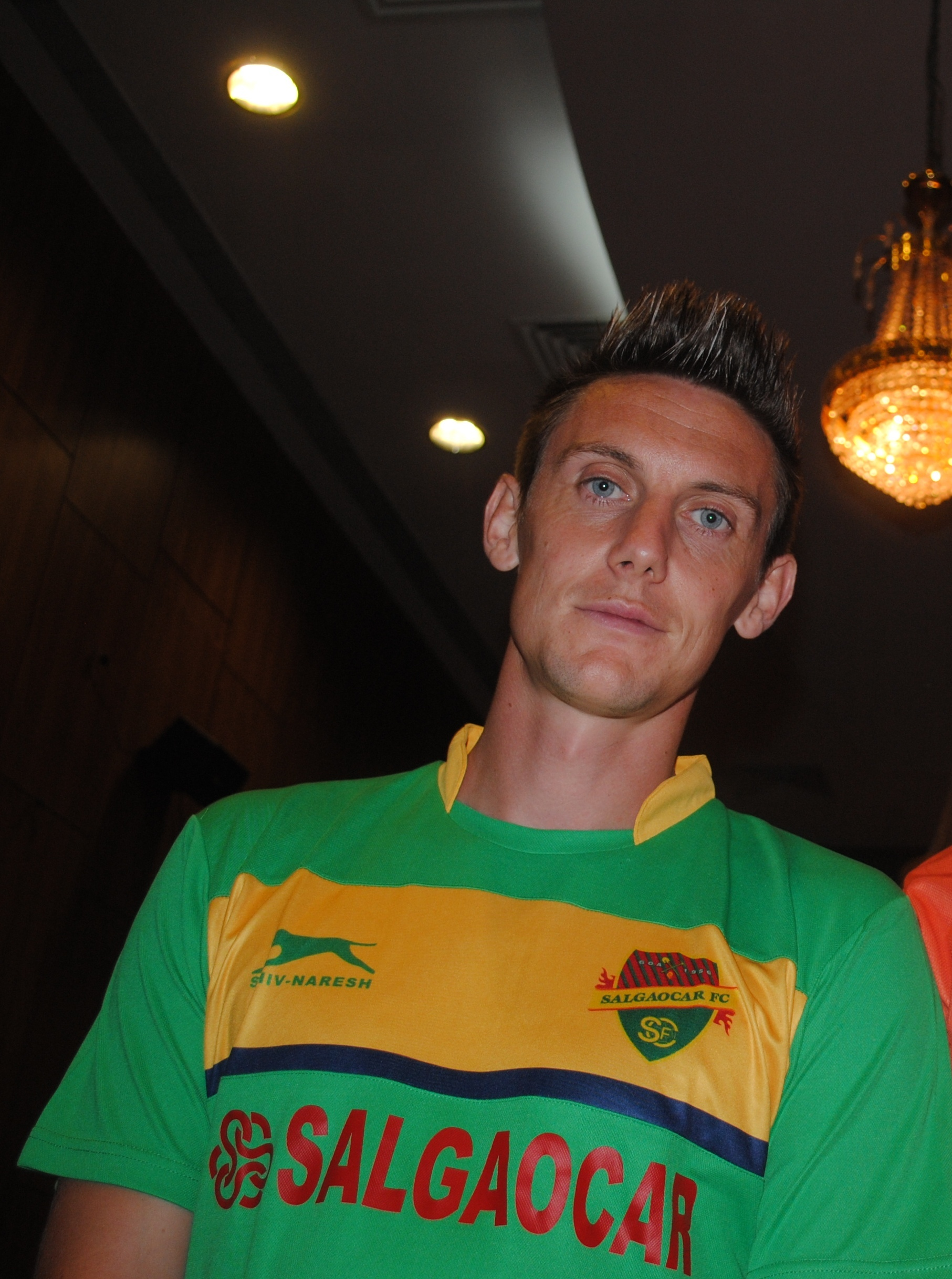
- Duffy with Salgaocar in 2015.

Personal information
- Full name: Darryl Alexander Duffy
- Date of birth: 16 April 1984 (age 42)
- Place of birth: Glasgow, Scotland
- Position: Striker

Senior career*
Years	Team	Apps	(Gls)
2003–2004	Rangers	3	(0)
2004	→ Brechin City (loan)	8	(4)
2004–2006	Falkirk	57	(27)
2006–2007	Hull City	24	(3)
2006	→ Hartlepool United (loan)	10	(5)
2007	→ Swansea City (loan)	8	(5)
2007–2008	Swansea City	20	(1)
2008–2011	Bristol Rovers	76	(16)
2010	→ Carlisle United (loan)	8	(1)
2010–2011	→ Hibernian (loan)	7	(0)
2011–2013	Cheltenham Town	65	(13)
2013–2016	Salgaocar	49	(32)
2015	→ Goa (loan)	4	(0)
2016–2017	Mohun Bagan	17	(11)
2017–2018	St Mirren	2	(0)
2018	→ Airdrieonians (loan)	10	(4)
2018–2019	Airdrieonians	39	(10)
2019–2020	Stirling Albion	25	(10)
2020–2023	Stranraer	40	(12)
2023–	Largs Thistle	30	(9)

International career
2005	Scotland U21	8	(4)
2005–2006	Scotland B	2	(0)
- * Club domestic league appearances and goals as of 18:09, 15 February 2024 (UTC)

Darryl Alexander Duffy (born 16 April 1984) is a Scottish footballer who plays as a striker for Largs Thistle. He began playing professionally in 2003 and has played for sixteen different teams across a number of countries. He played for Scotland U21s in 2005 and Scotland B in 2005–2006.

== Club career ==
=== Scotland ===
Born in Glasgow, Duffy made his debut for Rangers in a Scottish League Cup match against Forfar on 28 October 2003, coming on as an 84th-minute substitute for Maurice Ross. Two months later, 19 year old Duffy would make his League debut, in a 2–1 win over Dundee. He made his Champions League debut during a 3-1 defeat against Panathiaikos at Ibrox on 9 December 2003 https://www.uefa.com/uefachampionsleague/match/73377--rangers-vs-panathinaikos/

After rejecting an offer from Queen of the South, Duffy signed for Falkirk the following June. The then Falkirk manager John Hughes said that some "other clubs" from Scotland as well as from abroad were also interested in his signature. He scored on his debut in a Scottish League Challenge Cup against Ayr. In the following month, he would start his scoring with a brace against Montrose, finding the net in the 15th and 31st minute of a 4–1 victory. This would mark a start of nine goals in seven matches, and come the end of the season, Duffy would score a total of 27 goals in 44 appearances. His goal against St Johnstone would help Falkirk move to third place in the league table and Falkirk would end the season as the champions of the Scottish First Division, thus winning promotion to Scottish Premier League. He also went on to bag the Young Player of the Year award, along with the Young Player of August award. At the start of the new season, he was linked with a move away from the club, even though manager Hughes was optimistic of keeping him. In an interview to the club's website, he said "I've spoken to Darryl and he is fully committed to Falkirk FC." Duffy's first goal in the Premier League would come against Livingston. In the 2–0 victory, his 72nd minute shot would find the net, due to a deflection off Greg Strong. He would play a total of 16 matches, scoring nine goals in the top tier of the Scottish League until his transfer to Hull City.

=== England ===
Duffy joined Hull City on 10 January 2006, penning a two-and-a-half-year contract. Falkirk chairman Campbell Christie expressed his disappointment about the transfer saying that Duffy wanted to "develop" his career in England. Though BBC wrote that the transfer fee was £250,000, The Guardian said that he joined the club for an undisclosed fee. However, with limited opportunities at Hull, particularly after the departure of manager Peter Taylor, he joined Hartlepool United on loan in November 2006, scoring 5 goals in 10 games for the then League Two side.

An even more productive loan spell followed in February 2007, when Duffy joined League One side Swansea City on loan, scoring five goals in as many starts, as the Swans narrowly missed out on the playoffs. In July 2007 Duffy joined Swansea permanently, signing a three-year contract for an initial fee of £200,000.

Bristol Rovers signed Duffy from Swansea on 3 July 2008 for a transfer fee in the region of £100,000. Duffy scored twice in a 6–1 over Hereford United and in a 2–2 draw at Elland Road against Leeds United. At the end of the 2008–09 season, Duffy had scored 13 goals for Rovers. After this, however, Duffy's first team opportunities were restricted. He had a loan spell at Carlisle United where he scored once against MK Dons.

On 30 August 2010, Duffy signed a season-long loan deal with SPL side Hibernian to team up with his former Falkirk manager John Hughes. Duffy was ostensibly signed by Hibs as a replacement for Anthony Stokes, but suffered a foot injury soon after signing for the club. The injury meant that Duffy was unable to play for Hibs before Hughes left the club by mutual consent. Duffy featured infrequently after he returned from injury and Hibs announced in April 2011 that he would return to Bristol after the loan deal was completed.

Duffy was one of seventeen players released by Rovers in May 2011. Cheltenham Town announced in July that they had agreed to sign Duffy. The striker hit his first goals for the club in a 3–2 win at Northampton Town. He finished the 2011–12 season as top goalscorer with 15 goals. Cheltenham reached the League Two play-off final, but lost to Crewe. Duffy then fell out of favour at Cheltenham, making just five starting appearances in the 2012–13 season. He was offered a new contract by Cheltenham in May 2013, but he decided to leave the club due to his frustration at not playing regularly.

=== India ===
After training with Kilmarnock during the 2013 close season, Duffy signed for Indian club Salgaocar. Duffy scored the winner on his debut for Salgaocar in their 1–0 win over Churchill Brothers. Scottish striker scored 14 goals in 24 games for Salgaocar and won the Golden Boot in I-League along with Sunil Chhetri.

On 2 September 2015, he signed for Indian Super League franchise FC Goa on loan till the end of the season. Duffy left Goa in October due to hair line fracture on his shin bone.

During the summer transfer window of 2016, Duffy signed for Mohun Bagan from Salgaocar fc. He played for Mohun Bagan in the Calcutta Football League where he scored 6 goals in 8 matches. Duffy scored a brace in I-League against Shillong Lajong on 13 January 2017 and he was adjudged the man of the match.

=== Return to Scotland ===
Duffy signed a one-year deal with Scottish Championship club St Mirren on 10 August 2017. After finding it difficult to break into the first team, Duffy was loaned out to Scottish League One club Airdrieonians on 10 January 2018, for the remainder of the season. Duffy was released by St Mirren at the end of the season, and subsequently returned to Airdrieonians on a permanent deal in May 2018.

In July 2020, Duffy joined Stranraer. In June 2021, he became player-assistant manager, supporting Jamie Hammill, a role he held until April 2023 when the duo departed the club. In August 2023, he joined West of Scotland League Premier Division club Largs Thistle.

== International career ==
He represented the Scotland youth team in the Victory Shield and won it in 1999.

Duffy was selected for Scotland B against Poland and Turkey during the 2005 Future Cup.

He scored 4 goals in 8 appearances for Scotland under 21s.

== Career statistics ==
As of match played 28 August 2021

Appearances and goals by club, season and competition
Club	Season	League			Cup		Continental		Total	
Club	Season	Division	Apps	Goals	Apps	Goals	Apps	Goals	Apps	Goals
Rangers	2003–04	Scottish Premier League	1	0	1	0	1	0	3	0
Falkirk	2004–05	Scottish First Division	41	18	3	0	0	0	44	18
Falkirk	2005–06	Scottish Premier League	16	9	0	0	0	0	16	9
Falkirk	Total		57	27	3	0	0	0	60	27
Hull City	2005–06	Championship	15	3	0	0	0	0	15	3
Hull City	2006–07	Championship	9	0	2	0	0	0	11	0
Hull City	Total		24	3	2	0	0	0	26	3
Hartlepool United (loan)	2006–07	League Two	10	5	0	0	0	0	10	5
Swansea City (loan)	2006–07	League One	8	5	0	0	0	0	8	5
Swansea City	2007–08	League One	20	1	11	1	0	0	31	2
Bristol Rovers	2008–09	League One	43	13	2	0	0	0	45	13
Bristol Rovers	2009–10	League One	30	3	3	3	0	0	32	7
Bristol Rovers	2010–11	League One	3	0	0	0	0	0	3	0
Bristol Rovers	Total		76	16	5	3	0	0	81	19
Carlisle United (loan)	2009–10	League One	8	1	0	0	0	0	8	1
Hibernian (loan)	2010–11	Scottish Premier League	7	0	2	0	0	0	9	0
Cheltenham Town	2011–12	League Two	41	11	4	2	0	0	45	13
Cheltenham Town	2012–13	League Two	24	2	4	0	0	0	28	2
Cheltenham Town	Total		65	13	8	2	0	0	73	15
Salgaocar	2013–14	I-League	24	14	8	5	–	–	32	19
Salgaocar	2014–15	I-League	14	7	4	1	–	–	18	8
Salgaocar	Total		38	21	12	5	0	0	50	27
Goa (loan)	2015	Indian Super League	4	0	–		–		4	0
Mohun Bagan	2016–17	I-League	2	8	–		–		16	8
St Mirren	2017–18	Scottish Championship	2	0	2	0	0	0	4	0
Airdrieonians (loan)	2017–18	Scottish League One	10	4	0	0	0	0	10	4
Airdrieonians	2018–19	Scottish League One	32	10	7	4	0	0	39	14
Stirling Albion	2019–20	Scottish League Two	23	10	2	1	0	0	25	11
Stranraer	2020–21	Scottish League Two	20	5	9	2	0	0	29	7
Stranraer	2021–22	Scottish League Two	2	1	0	0	0	0	2	1
Stranraer	Total		22	6	9	2	0	0	31	8
Career total			409	130	64	19	1	0	488	149

== Honours ==
Swansea City

- Football League One: 2007–08

Individual

- Football Players' Association of India Foreign Player of the Year: 2013–14 (with Salgaocar)
