= Mark Yates (footballer) =

English footballer & manager (born 1970)

Personal information
- Full name: Mark Jason Yates
- Date of birth: 24 January 1970 (age 56)
- Place of birth: Birmingham, England
- Height: 5 ft 11 in (1.80 m)
- Position: Midfielder

Youth career
- 1986–1988: Birmingham City

Senior career*
Years	Team	Apps	(Gls)
1988–1991	Birmingham City	54	(6)
1990–1991	→ Colchester United (loan)	25	(6)
1991–1993	Burnley	18	(1)
1993	→ Lincoln City (loan)	14	(0)
1993–1994	Doncaster Rovers	34	(4)
1994–1999	Kidderminster Harriers	237	(40)
1999–2004	Cheltenham Town	227	(21)
2004	Kidderminster Harriers	12	(2)
Total		593	(74)

International career
1999	England semi-professional	2	(0)

Managerial career
- 2006–2009: Kidderminster Harriers
- 2009–2014: Cheltenham Town
- 2015–2016: Crawley Town
- 2017–2018: Solihull Moors
- 2018: Macclesfield Town
- 2019: Kidderminster Harriers
- 2020–2021: Stourbridge
- 2021: Solihull Moors
- * Club domestic league appearances and goals

Mark Jason Yates (born 24 January 1970) is an English former professional footballer and manager, most recently for Stourbridge. As a player, he played primarily in a central midfield role.

== Playing career ==
Born in Birmingham, Yates began his football career as a trainee at hometown club Birmingham City, before going on to sign professional terms with the club in 1988. He spent a total of three seasons at St Andrew's, making 66 first team appearances, including one in the side that won the 1991 Football League Trophy.

In 1991 Yates was sold to Burnley for £40,000 but struggled to hold down a regular position. Spells at Lincoln City and Doncaster Rovers followed, before Yates dropped out of the Football League to sign for Conference side Kidderminster Harriers in 1994, going on to become club captain. In his first season at the club Kidderminster reached the final of the FA Trophy, losing 2–1 to Woking. In 1997 Yates seemed set for a return to League football as Kidderminster led the Conference by a significant margin going into the final months of the season. However, the Harriers let the lead slip, allowing Macclesfield Town to overtake them and claim the championship.

In January 1999 Yates left Kidderminster to join local rivals Cheltenham Town for a fee of £25,000, helping the Robins to secure the league title and a place in the Football League. Yates remained with the Gloucestershire outfit until February 2004, enjoying reasonable success, the highlight being a victory in the 2002 Third Division play-off final. After falling out of favour at Whaddon Road, in 2004 Yates returned to Kidderminster, by this time a Football League club themselves, playing his part in the club's successful fight against relegation.

== Coaching and management ==
At the end of the 2004–05 season Yates called time on his playing career, becoming first team coach at Burnley alongside the manager who had signed him as a player at Cheltenham, Steve Cotterill.

=== Kidderminster Harriers ===
Yates took up his first managerial position with former club Kidderminster, now back in the Conference, a position which he took up on 6 January 2006. In his first season in charge he steered the club to safety from relegation, and in the second secured a top-half finish as well as an FA Trophy Final place at the new Wembley Stadium. He was twice voted Manager of the Month in this second season, for the months of December 2006 and January 2007.

=== Cheltenham Town ===
Yates was appointed manager of League Two team Cheltenham Town on 22 December 2009, with Neil Howarth joining him as first team coach. He led them to the 2012 League Two play-off final which they lost 2–0 to Crewe Alexandra. Yates guided Cheltenham to the League Two playoffs again in 2013 only to lose to Northampton Town 2–0 on aggregate. On 25 November 2014, Yates was sacked by Cheltenham Town after almost five years in charge. Cheltenham subsequently appointed Paul Buckle as manager.

=== Crawley Town ===
Yates was appointed manager of Crawley Town on 19 May 2015, following the club's relegation to League Two. After a poor showing during the 2015–16 season, Yates was sacked by the club on 25 April 2016.

=== Solihull Moors ===
In November 2017, Yates took over at Solihull Moors. At the time of his arrival, Solihull were bottom of the National League; they managed to survive after a run of 12 wins in 29 matches.

=== Macclesfield Town ===
In June 2018, Yates was appointed manager of EFL League Two side Macclesfield Town on a three-year deal. After a winless start to the season, Macclesfield sacked Yates on 8 October 2018.

=== Return to Kidderminster Harriers ===
In January 2019 Yates returned to his former club Kidderminster Harriers on a contract running until the end of the season. He left the club on 21 April 2019 two games before the end of the season with the club five points back from the play-off places.

=== Stourbridge ===
In late February 2020, Yates was announced as the new manager of Stourbridge. The team lost his first game away to Rushall Olympic, however the COVID-19 pandemic caused the league season to be abandoned. On 14 October 2021, Stourbridge parted company with Yates with the club sitting 18th in the table, one point clear of the relegation zone.

==== Solihull Moors ====
With Stourbridge's 2020–21 season also curtailed, Yates returned to Solihull Moors as manager on a short-term deal until the end of the season on 11 March 2021.

== Managerial statistics ==
As of match played 12 October 2021

Managerial record by team and tenure
Team	From	To	Record					Ref
Team	From	To	P	W	D	L	Win %	Ref
Kidderminster Harriers	6 January 2006	22 December 2009	216	92	52	72	42.6	
Cheltenham Town	22 December 2009	25 November 2014	257	93	69	95	36.2	
Crawley Town	19 May 2015	25 April 2016	47	13	8	26	27.7	
Solihull Moors	15 November 2017	19 June 2018	29	12	10	7	41.4	
Macclesfield Town	19 June 2018	8 October 2018	16	0	7	9	0.0	
Kidderminster Harriers	28 January 2019	21 April 2019	12	6	1	5	50.0	
Stourbridge	28 February 2020	14 October 2021	25	4	11	10	16.0	
Solihull Moors	11 March 2021	29 May 2021	19	11	2	6	57.9	
Total			621	231	160	230	37.2	—

== Honours ==
=== As a player ===
Birmingham City

- Associate Members' Cup: 1990–91

Burnley

- Football League Fourth Division: 1991–92

Kidderminster Harriers

- FA Trophy runner-up: 1994–95

Cheltenham Town

- Football League Third Division play-offs: 2002
- Football Conference: 1998–99

=== As a manager ===
Individual

- Football League Two Manager of the Month: November 2011, October 2012, December 2013
