= 2010–11 Isthmian League =

The 2010–11 season was the 96th season of the Isthmian League, which is an English football competition featuring semi-professional and amateur clubs from London, East and South East England.

== Premier Division ==
Isthmian League Premier Division
- Season: 2010–11
- Champions: Sutton United
- Promoted: Sutton United; Tonbridge Angels
- Relegated: Croydon Athletic; Folkestone Invicta; Maidstone United
- Matches: 462
- Goals: 1,286 (2.78 per match)
- Top goalscorer: 23 goals – Bobby Traynor (Kingstonian)
- Highest attendance: 1,367 – Sutton United – Carshalton Athletic, (25 April)
- Total attendance: 157,523
- Average attendance: 341 (-2.3% to previous season)

The Premier Division consisted of 22 clubs, including 17 clubs from the previous season, and five new clubs:

- Bury Town, promoted and transferred as champions of Southern Football League Division One Midlands
- Concord Rangers, promoted as play-off winners in Division One North
- Croydon Athletic, promoted as champions of Division One South
- Folkestone Invicta, promoted as play-off winners in Division One South
- Lowestoft Town, promoted as champions of Division One North

Sutton United won the division and were promoted back to the Conference South at the third attempt after two play-off defeats, along with play-off winners Tonbridge Angels. Maidstone United, Croydon Athletic, and Folkestone Invicta were relegated while Aveley were reprieved due to Rushden & Diamonds and Ilkeston Town folding in the Football Conference.

=== League table ===
Pos	Team	Pld	W	D	L	GF	GA	GD	Pts	Promotion or relegation
1	Sutton United	42	26	9	7	76	33	+43	87	Promoted to the Conference South
2	Tonbridge Angels	42	22	10	10	71	45	+26	76	Qualified for the play-offs, then promoted to the Conference South
3	Bury Town	42	22	10	10	67	49	+18	76	Qualified for the play-offs
4	Lowestoft Town	42	20	15	7	68	30	+38	75	Qualified for the play-offs
5	Harrow Borough	42	22	7	13	77	51	+26	73	Qualified for the play-offs
6	Canvey Island	42	21	10	11	69	51	+18	73	
7	Kingstonian	42	21	9	12	66	50	+16	72	
8	Concord Rangers	42	21	8	13	72	55	+17	71	
9	Cray Wanderers	42	20	9	13	72	46	+26	69	
10	AFC Hornchurch	42	19	12	11	58	46	+12	69	
11	Billericay Town	42	20	9	13	56	45	+11	69	
12	Wealdstone	42	16	10	16	58	54	+4	58	
13	Carshalton Athletic	42	14	10	18	49	57	−8	52	
14	Tooting & Mitcham United	42	13	10	19	63	85	−22	49	
15	Hendon	42	12	10	20	61	81	−20	46	
16	Margate	42	11	12	19	52	64	−12	45	
17	Horsham	42	11	11	20	43	77	−34	44	
18	Hastings United	42	9	11	22	50	65	−15	38	
19	Aveley	42	10	8	24	35	62	−27	38	Reprieved from relegation
20	Maidstone United	42	9	10	23	43	75	−32	37	Relegated to Division One South
21	Croydon Athletic	42	10	4	28	44	95	−51	31 (Note: Croydon Athletic were deducted three points for fielding an ineligible player against Folkestone Invicta on 21 August (2–0).)	Relegated to Division One South
22	Folkestone Invicta	42	5	12	25	34	68	−34	27	Relegated to Division One South

Rules for classification: 1) points; 2) goal difference; 3) number of goals scored.

==== Top scorers ====
Player	Club	Goals
Bobby Traynor	Kingstonian	23
Laurent Hamici	Cray Wanderers	22
Tom Bradbrook	Margate / Sittingbourne	21
Richard Jolly	Sutton United / Wealdstone	21
Rocky Baptiste	Harrow Borough	20
Tony Stokes	Concord Rangers	19
Francis Collin	Tonbridge Angels	18
Robert King	Canvey Island	18
Martin Tuohy	AFC Hornchurch	18
Peter Dean	Wealdstone	16

=== Play-offs ===
==== Semi-finals ====
3 May 2011	Bury Town	1–2	Lowestoft Town	Ram Meadow, Bury St Edmunds
19:45	Henderson 49'		Nunn 63' (o.g.); Genchev 67'	Attendance: 1,427

3 May 2011	Tonbridge Angels	3–2 (a.e.t.)	Harrow Borough	Longmead Stadium, Tonbridge
19:45	Piper 6'; Kinch 23'; Olorunda 110'		Baptiste 26' 69'	Attendance: 1,124

==== Final ====
7 May 2011	Tonbridge Angels	4–3	Lowestoft Town	Longmead Stadium, Tonbridge
15:00	Olorunda 12'; Walder 22' 39' (pen.); Taylor 78'		Mitchell 30'; Cave-Brown 48'; Genchev 67'	Attendance: 2,411

=== Results grid ===
Home \ Away	AFC	AVE	BIL	BUR	CAN	CAR	CON	CRA	CRO	FOL	HAR	HAS	HEN	HOR	KIN	LOW	MDS	MAR	SUT	TON	T&M	WEA
AFC Hornchurch		1–0	1–1	1–1	0–3	4–0	2–0	1–0	1–0	4–0	2–0	1–0	0–0	0–2	1–1	1–2	2–0	2–1	1–1	3–1	2–2	2–2
Aveley	1–4		0–1	0–2	1–3	2–0	1–1	0–3	3–0	1–1	0–2	1–3	0–2	1–0	1–1	0–3	1–2	1–1	0–0	0–3	3–1	0–1
Billericay Town	2–0	1–0		1–2	1–0	0–0	2–1	3–2	1–2	4–2	1–3	3–0	2–0	2–1	0–1	1–3	1–0	0–0	1–0	3–0	1–0	1–0
Bury Town	1–3	2–1	3–0		2–1	3–0	1–2	2–2	1–0	1–1	2–5	2–1	2–2	2–0	0–0	0–0	1–2	2–1	2–1	1–2	2–1	1–0
Canvey Island	3–0	2–1	3–2	3–0		1–1	0–4	4–2	3–2	1–0	2–0	2–2	4–1	3–1	0–2	0–0	3–0	2–0	1–3	1–0	0–2	1–1
Carshalton Athletic	0–0	2–2	1–3	1–0	1–0		2–4	1–1	1–2	1–0	0–1	1–1	2–1	0–0	1–3	2–0	0–0	1–3	0–2	3–2	2–0	2–3
Concord Rangers	1–3	0–1	1–1	2–2	1–0	1–1		2–0	3–0	2–1	3–0	2–1	3–2	2–0	2–1	0–2	3–2	0–0	0–0	1–2	3–0	1–6
Cray Wanderers	1–2	3–0	1–3	2–1	0–0	2–1	2–1		4–0	0–1	5–1	2–0	3–1	1–1	2–0	0–1	2–1	2–0	0–2	0–1	2–3	1–0
Croydon Athletic	0–3	0–2	0–0	1–3	0–4	1–4	1–3	3–1		2–1	1–3	2–0	1–4	2–4	0–4	0–2	1–2	5–3	0–3	2–0	0–1	2–2
Folkestone Invicta	1–1	1–2	1–1	0–2	1–2	1–2	1–1	1–1	0–2		1–0	1–3	1–2	0–0	1–0	1–4	4–0	1–2	0–2	0–0	1–3	1–1
Harrow Borough	1–0	1–2	1–1	2–0	6–1	2–1	0–2	1–1	3–1	2–0		2–2	2–3	6–0	1–0	2–0	2–0	0–0	0–0	2–0	2–0	2–4
Hastings United	0–1	2–3	1–0	0–2	0–1	0–1	0–3	1–1	3–1	2–2	2–0		1–1	2–3	1–2	0–0	1–2	3–0	2–3	1–2	3–2	2–0
Hendon	2–1	1–2	1–1	3–3	0–3	1–0	4–1	2–2	4–0	2–1	0–3	0–0		4–0	2–3	1–1	2–3	2–3	1–0	0–3	4–1	0–1
Horsham	0–0	0–0	1–2	1–4	1–1	2–1	1–3	0–4	1–1	0–0	1–7	1–1	1–2		2–3	1–2	1–1	1–1	3–1	0–2	1–0	2–1
Kingstonian	2–1	2–0	4–2	1–1	3–1	0–1	0–3	2–1	2–1	0–1	1–3	3–1	3–0	1–3		2–0	0–1	1–0	1–0	1–1	4–2	1–3
Lowestoft Town	2–0	1–0	1–1	0–1	1–1	0–0	2–0	0–1	4–0	4–1	3–0	1–1	8–1	4–0	1–1		3–3	2–1	0–0	0–0	0–0	0–0
Maidstone United	0–0	1–1	0–2	1–2	0–1	1–3	2–0	2–4	0–1	2–0	0–0	2–4	2–2	0–1	1–2	0–1		0–2	0–1	0–3	1–1	2–4
Margate	2–2	2–0	0–1	0–1	2–2	2–1	1–2	0–2	0–2	0–2	2–3	2–0	1–1	6–1	3–3	0–3	1–1		3–2	0–1	3–3	1–0
Sutton United	3–0	2–1	1–0	2–1	2–0	2–0	1–1	1–1	5–0	1–0	2–1	2–1	3–0	2–0	2–0	2–1	5–1	2–1		2–2	2–2	4–3
Tonbridge Angels	7–1	1–0	3–1	2–3	1–1	4–0	3–2	0–4	1–0	1–0	1–2	2–0	2–1	2–0	1–1	3–3	1–0	1–1	0–1		3–3	2–0
Tooting & Mitcham United	1–1	1–2	3–2	1–3	1–2	0–5	3–2	0–3	2–2	4–1	3–2	1–1	4–3	2–2	1–1	2–1	3–4	3–0	0–3	1–5		1–0
Wealdstone	0–3	2–0	1–0	0–0	3–3	0–3	1–3	0–1	4–3	1–1	1–1	2–1	1–0	3–0	2–1	0–2	1–1	0–1	2–1	0–0	3–0	

Updated to match(es) played on 30 April 2011. Source: Ryman League Premier Division
Legend: Blue = home team win; Yellow = draw; Red = away team win.

=== Stadia and locations ===
Locations of the Premier Division clubs
Greater London Premier Division football clubs

Club	Stadium	Capacity
AFC Hornchurch	Hornchurch Stadium	3,500
Aveley	The Mill Field (groundshare with Romford)	1,100
Billericay Town	New Lodge	3,500
Bury Town	Ram Meadow	3,500
Canvey Island	Brockwell Stadium	4,308
Carshalton Athletic	War Memorial Sports Ground	5,000
Concord Rangers	Thames Road	1,500
Cray Wanderers	Hayes Lane (groundshare with Bromley)	6,000
Croydon Athletic	Keith Tuckey Stadium	3,000
Folkestone Invicta	Cheriton Road	4,000
Harrow Borough	Earlsmead Stadium	3,070
Hastings United	The Pilot Field	4,050
Hendon	Vale Farm (groundshare with Wembley)	3,000
Horsham	Gorings Mead (groundshare with Horsham YMCA)	1,500
Kingstonian	Kingsmeadow (groundshare with AFC Wimbledon)	4,722
Lowestoft Town	Crown Meadow	2,250
Maidstone United	The Homelands	3,200
Margate	Hartsdown Park	2,100
Sutton United	Gander Green Lane	7,032
Tonbridge Angels	Longmead Stadium	3,000
Tooting & Mitcham United	Imperial Fields	3,500
Wealdstone	Grosvenor Vale	2,640

== Division One North ==
Isthmian League Division One North
- Season: 2010–11
- Champions: East Thurrock United
- Promoted: East Thurrock United; Wingate & Finchley
- Relegated: None
- Matches: 420
- Goals: 1,356 (3.23 per match)
- Top goalscorer: 33 goals – Craig Parker (Needham Market)
- Highest attendance: 763 – Brentwood Town – Cheshunt, (23 April)
- Total attendance: 56,460
- Average attendance: 134 (+2.3% to previous season)

Division One North consisted of 22 clubs, including 18 clubs from the previous season, and four new clubs:

- AFC Sudbury, transferred from Southern Football League Division One Central
- Grays Athletic, relegated from the Conference Premier and took voluntary demotion to this level
- Needham Market, promoted as champions of the Eastern Counties League
- Waltham Abbey, relegated from the Premier Division

Leyton withdrew from Division One North on 14 January 2011, but expressed a wish to retain a team in the Youth League. At a meeting on 20 February this proposal was rejected and the club was expelled from the League. The club's record of P19 W1 D6 L12 GF13 GA45 Pts9 was expunged on 24 February.

East Thurrock United won the division and were promoted back to the Premier Division after two seasons of absence along with play-off winners Wingate & Finchley. Waltham Forest were reprieved due to clubs folding higher up the pyramid, so no teams were relegated from the division this season.

=== League table ===
Pos	Team	Pld	W	D	L	GF	GA	GD	Pts	Promotion or relegation
1	East Thurrock United	40	30	5	5	92	38	+54	95	Promoted to the Premier Division
2	Needham Market	40	26	9	5	95	49	+46	87	Qualified for the play-offs
3	Wingate & Finchley	40	21	9	10	72	54	+18	72	Qualified for the play-offs, then promoted to the Premier Division
4	Harlow Town	40	21	8	11	61	51	+10	71	Qualified for the play-offs
5	Brentwood Town	40	20	9	11	75	55	+20	69	Qualified for the play-offs
6	Enfield Town	40	21	5	14	76	44	+32	68	
7	AFC Sudbury	40	18	12	10	82	64	+18	66	
8	Maldon & Tiptree	40	18	9	13	70	67	+3	63	
9	Heybridge Swifts	40	17	10	13	81	59	+22	61	
10	Grays Athletic	40	17	10	13	69	51	+18	61	
11	Waltham Abbey	40	16	10	14	75	63	+12	58	
12	Romford	40	16	7	17	63	66	−3	55	
13	Potters Bar Town	40	14	9	17	60	68	−8	51	
14	Ware	40	13	6	21	57	77	−20	45	
15	Great Wakering Rovers	40	13	5	22	60	82	−22	44	
16	Redbridge	40	10	9	21	51	79	−28	39	
17	Thamesmead Town	40	11	6	23	42	71	−29	39	
18	Cheshunt	40	10	8	22	49	81	−32	38	
19	Tilbury	40	11	4	25	41	66	−25	37	
20	Ilford	40	8	8	24	42	81	−39	32	
21	Waltham Forest	40	6	8	26	43	90	−47	26	Reprieved from relegation
22	Leyton	0	0	0	0	0	0	0	0	Expelled from league, record expunged

Rules for classification: 1) points; 2) goal difference; 3) number of goals scored.

==== Top scorers ====
Player	Club	Goals
Craig Parker	Needham Market	33
James Baker	AFC Sudbury	24
Kris Newby	East Thurrock United	22
Leon Smith	Wingate & Finchley	21
Sam Newson	Needham Market	19

=== Play-offs ===
==== Semi-finals ====
3 May 2011	Needham Market	1–3	Brentwood Town	Bloomfields, Needham Market
19:45	Parker 44' (pen.)		Doyle 45' (pen.); Edgar 50'; Yao 62'	Attendance: 344

3 May 2011	Wingate & Finchley	4–2 (a.e.t.)	Harlow Town	The Harry Abrahams Stadium, Finchley
19:45	Smith 67' 95'; Laird 100'; Jones 108'		Brayley 78'; 115'	Attendance: 327

==== Final ====
7 May 2011	Wingate & Finchley	3–2 (a.e.t.)	Brentwood Town	The Harry Abrahams Stadium, Finchley
15:00	Laird 6'; Smith 12'; Jones 117'		Blewitt 45+6'; Yao (red card); Dafter 80'	Attendance: 528

=== Results grid ===
Home \ Away	SUD	BRE	CHE	ETU	ENF	GRY	GWR	HAR	HEY	ILF	LEY	M&T	NDH	POT	RED	ROM	THA	TIL	WAL	WFO	WAR	W&F
AFC Sudbury		2–1	2–2	0–2	1–5	3–3	4–0	1–0	2–1	1–1		6–3	2–2	6–0	3–0	0–4	2–1	0–0	2–4	3–3	5–1	1–1
Brentwood Town	2–3		1–1	1–3	0–6	2–1	4–0	1–1	3–3	2–1		1–2	2–4	1–0	2–0	2–0	3–0	2–0	2–2	3–1	2–1	2–3
Cheshunt	0–2	1–3		0–1	0–3	0–3	2–0	0–3	1–1	5–2		1–2	2–0	1–0	1–3	2–3	2–0	1–2	2–1	1–0	3–1	0–4
East Thurrock United	4–2	2–2	3–3		2–0	4–0	3–2	3–0	1–2	2–1		1–0	2–1	3–1	4–1	3–0	0–2	3–2	2–1	4–1	3–0	2–1
Enfield Town	2–0	0–1	1–2	0–4		2–0	0–3	5–0	3–0	1–0		0–1	0–0	2–3	2–1	1–1	0–1	2–0	2–1	3–0	4–0	1–2
Grays Athletic	1–1	0–0	9–0	1–3	2–0		1–2	0–1	1–1	3–0		1–1	2–3	1–2	2–2	3–0	4–1	3–1	1–0	4–0	1–1	2–1
Great Wakering Rovers	0–4	2–7	4–1	1–1	1–3	0–1		1–1	2–1	4–2		1–2	0–1	5–6	1–3	0–1	2–0	2–0	1–3	2–2	3–2	3–2
Harlow Town	1–0	0–4	3–4	1–1	2–2	1–2	1–0		2–1	2–0		3–0	1–2	3–0	1–1	4–1	2–1	1–0	1–2	3–1	1–1	1–0
Heybridge Swifts	5–1	0–3	5–2	1–3	2–2	3–1	1–2	1–2		7–2		4–0	0–1	2–0	2–3	2–3	4–0	1–0	1–1	1–1	2–1	2–2
Ilford	0–1	2–0	1–0	0–4	0–1	0–2	1–3	0–2	1–4			0–1	1–2	1–0	2–0	3–2	1–0	1–2	1–1	0–1	0–3	1–3
Leyton																						
Maldon & Tiptree	1–1	1–1	3–1	0–1	2–4	1–2	3–1	4–1	2–4	1–1			2–2	2–2	3–2	2–0	1–1	2–1	2–1	4–1	3–2	0–0
Needham Market	3–2	0–0	3–2	3–0	3–2	1–1	3–2	1–1	0–0	3–3		4–0		1–0	7–1	2–1	3–1	2–1	4–2	4–0	3–2	4–1
Potters Bar Town	2–2	0–0	1–0	0–2	1–0	2–3	2–2	0–1	2–1	0–1		0–2	2–2		2–2	1–2	4–1	1–0	0–4	0–0	4–0	4–4
Redbridge	0–1	4–0	0–0	0–3	0–2	1–1	2–1	1–2	1–4	1–1		0–5	0–5	2–1		1–3	1–2	1–1	2–2	4–1	1–1	1–2
Romford	1–3	0–2	2–1	0–2	2–0	2–0	3–0	2–4	0–0	3–3		3–1	1–3	1–3	3–1		0–3	0–3	2–3	5–1	3–0	1–1
Thamesmead Town	2–2	1–2	1–1	1–2	0–3	0–2	0–1	1–2	2–1	2–2		3–3	0–2	0–3	0–2	1–1		3–1	3–0	1–0	3–1	0–3
Tilbury	1–2	0–2	0–0	0–2	0–4	3–2	3–1	2–0	3–4	2–0		0–2	3–2	1–2	0–2	3–3	0–1		2–1	1–0	0–2	1–2
Waltham Abbey	0–2	5–2	1–1	2–2	0–2	2–0	2–1	0–1	1–1	6–2		3–2	0–2	2–2	1–0	0–1	2–0	4–0		5–4	3–0	2–4
Waltham Forest	3–2	0–3	2–1	0–2	2–3	0–2	0–0	1–2	1–2	2–2		4–0	1–3	1–3	2–1	1–1	1–2	0–2	1–1		4–1	0–2
Ware	2–2	1–3	3–1	3–2	2–1	3–0	4–2	2–2	0–1	1–2		0–4	4–3	2–0	1–2	0–2	4–1	1–0	0–1	2–0		0–0
Wingate & Finchley	0–3	2–1	2–1	2–1	2–2	1–1	0–2	2–1	1–3	1–0		3–0	2–1	2–4	2–1	1–0	1–0	2–0	3–3	5–0	0–2	

Updated to match(es) played on 30 April 2011. Source: Ryman League Division One North
Legend: Blue = home team win; Yellow = draw; Red = away team win.

=== Stadia and locations ===
Locations of Division One North
Greater London Division One North clubs
Division One Central Essex teams

Club	Stadium	Capacity
AFC Sudbury	King's Marsh	3,800
Brentwood Town	The Brentwood Centre Arena	1,800
Cheshunt	Cheshunt Stadium	3,000
East Thurrock United	Rookery Hill	4,000
Enfield Town	Goldsdown Road (groundshare with Enfield 1893)	3,000
Grays Athletic	Rookery Hill (groundshare with East Thurrock United)	4,000
Great Wakering Rovers	Burroughs Park	3,500
Harlow Town	Barrows Farm	3,500
Heybridge Swifts	Scraley Road	3,000
Ilford	Cricklefield Stadium	3,500
Leyton	Leyton Stadium	2,500
Maldon & Tiptree	Wallace Binder Ground	2,000
Needham Market	Bloomfields	4,000
Potters Bar Town	Parkfield	2,000
Redbridge	Oakside	3,000
Romford	Mill Field (groundshare with Aveley)	1,100
Thamesmead Town	Bayliss Avenue	6,000
Tilbury	Chadfields	4,000
Waltham Abbey	Capershotts	3,500
Waltham Forest	Cricklefield Stadium (groundshare with Ilford)	3,500
Ware	Wodson Park	3,300
Wingate & Finchley	The Harry Abrahams Stadium	1,500

== Division One South ==
Isthmian League Division One South
- Season: 2010–11
- Champions: Metropolitan Police
- Promoted: Leatherhead; Metropolitan Police
- Relegated: Horsham YMCA
- Matches: 462
- Goals: 1,516 (3.28 per match)
- Top goalscorer: 38 goals – Jason Prior (Bognor Regis Town)
- Highest attendance: 1,319 – Bognor Regis Town – Worthing, (25 April)
- Total attendance: 74,620
- Average attendance: 162 (+1.3% to previous season)

Division One South consisted of 22 clubs, including 19 clubs from the previous season, and three new clubs:

- Bognor Regis Town, relegated from the Premier Division
- Faversham Town, promoted as champions of the Kent League
- Whitehawk, promoted as champions of the Sussex County League

Metropolitan Police won the division and were promoted to the Premier Division along with play-off winners Leatherhead. Bognor Regis Town missed out on the title by a single goal after a draw against Chatham Town on the final day of the season. The draw was not enough for Chatham Town to escape the relegation zone although they were later reprieved due to clubs folding higher up the pyramid. So, Horsham YMCA were the only club relegated from the Isthmian League this season.

=== League table ===
Pos	Team	Pld	W	D	L	GF	GA	GD	Pts	Promotion or relegation
1	Metropolitan Police	42	30	6	6	102	41	+61	96	Promoted to the Premier Division
2	Bognor Regis Town	42	29	9	4	103	43	+60	96	Qualified for the play-offs
3	Whitehawk	42	26	10	6	109	44	+65	88	Qualified for the play-offs
4	Leatherhead	42	27	7	8	100	41	+59	88	Qualified for the play-offs, then promoted to the Premier Division
5	Dulwich Hamlet	42	19	8	15	79	59	+20	65	Qualified for the play-offs
6	Walton & Hersham	42	18	8	16	69	58	+11	62	
7	Burgess Hill Town	42	16	14	12	69	60	+9	62	
8	Ramsgate	42	16	12	14	65	63	+2	60	
9	Faversham Town	42	14	17	11	55	48	+7	59	
10	Chipstead	42	15	12	15	63	67	−4	57	
11	Sittingbourne	42	16	8	18	52	66	−14	56	
12	Walton Casuals	42	15	8	19	65	71	−6	53	
13	Fleet Town	42	14	10	18	68	90	−22	52	Transferred to SFL Division One Central
14	Worthing	42	12	14	16	76	72	+4	50	
15	Whitstable Town	42	12	13	17	58	75	−17	49	
16	Whyteleafe	42	14	3	25	65	94	−29	45	
17	Godalming Town	42	13	6	23	52	82	−30	45	
18	Eastbourne Town	42	11	11	20	60	78	−18	44	
19	Merstham	42	10	15	17	60	85	−25	44 (Note: Merstham were deducted one point for fielding an ineligible player against Worthing on 26 February (3–3).)	
20	Corinthian-Casuals	42	11	9	22	53	80	−27	42	
21	Chatham Town	42	10	10	22	52	80	−28	40	Reprieved from relegation, then transferred to Division One North
22	Horsham YMCA	42	5	8	29	41	119	−78	23	Relegated to the Sussex County League

Rules for classification: 1) points; 2) goal difference; 3) number of goals scored.

==== Top scorers ====
Player	Club	Goals
Jason Prior	Bognor Regis Town	38
Greg Andrews	Leatherhead	33
Tommy Hutchings	Leatherhead	25
Ian Pulman	Whitstable Town	25
Craig Watkins	Metropolitan Police	22

=== Play-offs ===
==== Semi-finals ====
3 May 2011	Bognor Regis Town	1–3	Dulwich Hamlet	Nyewood Lane, Bognor Regis
19:45	Johnson 43'		Gonsalves 10'; Drewett 28'; Powell 75'	Attendance: 621

3 May 2011	Whitehawk	1–1 (3–4 p)	Leatherhead	Enclosed Ground, Whitehawk
19:45	Armstrong 49' (pen.)		Hutchings 68'	Attendance: 280

==== Final ====
6 May 2012	Leatherhead	4–3 (a.e.t.)	Dulwich Hamlet	Fetcham Grove, Leatherhead
15:00	Andrews 45'; Terry 83' 90+6' 99'		Drewett 19' 51'; Francis 44'	Attendance: 1,022

=== Results grid ===
Home \ Away	BOG	BUR	CHA	CHI	COR	DUL	EST	FAV	FLE	GOD	HYM	LEA	MER	MET	RAM	SIT	W&H	WAL	WHI	WHT	WHY	WOR
Bognor Regis Town		4–1	3–1	3–0	2–2	2–0	1–3	2–0	5–0	2–0	4–1	3–2	3–3	1–0	1–1	4–1	4–0	2–0	2–1	1–1	1–0	3–1
Burgess Hill Town	2–1		1–1	3–0	1–1	1–1	1–1	1–1	6–0	3–1	4–0	0–2	1–2	2–2	1–1	3–1	2–3	2–2	2–2	1–1	4–0	2–0
Chatham Town	1–0	1–0		0–3	1–0	3–2	3–1	0–2	4–1	3–2	2–1	1–1	4–0	2–2	0–1	1–0	3–2	3–2	6–1	0–0	1–2	1–1
Chipstead	1–3	2–1	2–2		3–1	1–4	1–1	2–1	2–4	2–1	2–1	1–3	2–2	2–2	1–1	0–1	2–1	2–1	1–1	2–2	1–2	2–0
Corinthian-Casuals	1–2	4–0	2–1	2–0		3–1	0–3	1–1	1–2	1–3	3–1	1–2	2–1	0–4	2–0	3–2	1–3	1–1	3–4	2–9	3–2	1–1
Dulwich Hamlet	1–0	1–0	5–2	3–2	3–1		2–2	2–2	6–0	4–0	1–1	1–0	0–1	0–1	2–4	3–0	2–0	1–2	0–1	2–1	1–0	1–2
Eastbourne Town	0–1	2–1	2–0	2–0	5–1	0–3		4–1	1–1	1–0	4–4	1–2	0–1	1–2	0–1	4–4	2–1	6–0	3–5	1–2	2–2	1–3
Faversham Town	4–0	1–1	2–1	2–2	3–0	1–2	3–0		2–2	3–1	2–0	0–4	4–1	0–2	0–2	3–1	2–0	0–1	2–1	1–1	1–0	2–2
Fleet Town	0–2	0–2	3–1	1–1	1–0	2–2	3–1	1–1		2–0	4–2	1–3	1–1	0–2	2–1	1–0	0–3	3–1	0–1	3–2	1–2	1–1
Godalming Town	0–6	1–1	2–0	9–0	2–1	3–5	0–1	3–0	0–5		3–0	1–2	1–2	2–0	1–2	0–2	1–3	4–3	0–3	1–2	4–1	2–2
Horsham YMCA	0–3	1–4	1–1	2–2	0–3	0–2	3–2	3–1	2–0	0–2		0–11	3–5	3–0	2–3	0–5	0–2	0–3	2–2	2–3	2–1	4–1
Leatherhead	3–2	1–0	2–0	1–2	0–1	2–0	7–3	3–0	2–1	0–2	11–0		4–0	0–2	3–3	2–0	2–1	2–2	2–1	3–0	1–1	1–1
Merstham	2–4	0–1	0–2	0–4	3–1	2–3	1–1	1–1	5–2	1–0	2–2	0–3		0–3	1–2	1–1	2–2	1–5	1–4	4–3	0–3	0–1
Metropolitan Police	1–1	3–0	2–2	3–1	5–0	4–0	1–1	2–0	4–1	8–1	3–1	1–0	1–0		3–0	1–0	4–2	2–0	0–3	5–2	4–5	0–3
Ramsgate	1–3	1–3	2–1	0–1	3–1	0–0	3–1	2–2	2–2	1–0	2–2	0–2	0–1	1–1		0–2	1–1	5–1	2–2	0–1	5–0	3–3
Sittingbourne	0–5	0–1	2–0	0–3	1–0	2–2	0–1	1–1	2–1	2–2	1–0	1–2	1–1	0–2	3–0		0–3	1–0	2–2	2–0	2–1	0–4
Walton & Hersham	1–1	1–1	1–2	1–2	1–1	0–2	0–1	3–2	3–2	0–2	3–0	0–2	3–1	0–2	3–0	0–1		1–0	0–2	3–1	1–3	3–1
Walton Casuals	1–2	3–0	2–0	2–1	2–1	2–2	1–0	1–2	2–1	1–1	2–0	0–5	3–0	1–4	2–3	2–2	1–3		0–1	1–2	4–1	3–1
Whitehawk	1–2	6–0	4–1	3–1	6–0	3–1	3–0	2–2	2–0	5–0	6–1	2–1	1–0	0–2	4–2	4–0	0–1	1–0		1–0	5–0	1–0
Whitstable Town	1–0	1–0	2–1	0–3	4–0	0–1	1–2	0–1	2–3	1–2	4–0	2–2	1–0	0–6	1–0	2–1	0–1	2–1	1–3		3–4	3–2
Whyteleafe	1–5	2–3	0–1	1–2	4–2	2–1	2–3	1–0	3–4	2–1	2–0	2–6	1–1	1–2	0–1	0–1	2–5	4–0	1–2	3–2		1–2
Worthing	2–2	2–0	3–1	4–1	3–0	1–4	1–0	1–2	3–3	2–3	5–0	1–2	3–3	2–3	1–2	1–2	1–6	2–3	2–0	1–2	4–0	

Updated to match(es) played on 30 April 2011. Source: Ryman League Division One South
Legend: Blue = home team win; Yellow = draw; Red = away team win.

=== Stadia and locations ===
Locations of Division One South clubs
Division One South Surrey clubs

Club	Stadium	Capacity
Chatham Town	The Sports Ground	5,000
Bognor Regis Town	Nyewood Lane	4,000
Burgess Hill Town	Leylands Park	2,000
Chipstead	High Road	2,000
Corinthian-Casuals	King George's Field	2,700
Dulwich Hamlet	Champion Hill	3,000
Eastbourne Town	The Saffrons	3,000
Faversham Town	Shepherd Neame Stadium	2,000
Fleet Town	Calthorpe Park	2,000
Godalming Town	Weycourt	3,000
Horsham YMCA	Gorings Mead (groundshare with Horsham)	1,500
Leatherhead	Fetcham Grove	3,400
Merstham	Moatside	2,000
Metropolitan Police	Imber Court	3,000
Ramsgate	Southwood Stadium	2,500
Sittingbourne	Bourne Park	3,000
Walton & Hersham	The Sports Ground	2,000
Walton Casuals	Waterside Stadium	2,000
Whitehawk	The Enclosed Ground	2,000
Whitstable Town	The Belmont Ground	3,000
Whyteleafe	Church Road	2,000
Worthing	Woodside Road	4,000

== League Cup ==
2010–11 Isthmian League Cup
Tournament details
- Country: England
- Teams: 66

Final positions
- Champions: Wingate & Finchley
- Runners-up: Dulwich Hamlet

Tournament statistics
- Matches played: 65
- Goals scored: 212 (3.26 per match)

The Isthmian League Cup 2010–11 (billed as the Championship Manager Cup 2010–11 for sponsorship reasons) is the 37th season of the Isthmian League Cup, the cup competition of the whole Isthmian League. Sixty-six clubs took part.

=== Calendar ===
Round	Dates	Matches	Clubs
First round	14 September to 15 September	2	66 → 64
Second round	5 October to 16 November	32	64 → 32
Third round	2 November to 27 January	16	32 → 16
Fourth round	14 December to 7 February	8	16 → 8
Quarterfinals	8 February to 22 February	4	8 → 4
Semifinals	8 March 2011	2	4 → 2
Final	30 March 2011	1	2 → 1

=== First round ===
Four clubs from Division Ones participated in the first round, while all other clubs received a bye to the second round.

Tie	Home team (tier)	Score	Away team (tier)	Att.
1	Waltham Forest (N)	1–0	Grays Athletic (N)	75
2	Fleet Town (S)	4–3	Horsham YMCA (S)	63

=== Second round ===
The two clubs to have made it through the first round were entered into the draw with every other Isthmian League club, making sixty-four teams.

Tie	Home team (tier)	Score	Away team (tier)	Att.
3	Hendon (P)	1–2	Harrow Borough (P)	98
4	Lowestoft Town (P)	2–0	AFC Sudbury (N)	314
5	Cheshunt (N)	2–1	Harlow Town (N)	106
6	Wingate & Finchley (N)	3–1	Bury Town (P)	66
7	Ware (N)	0–3	Wealdstone (P)	79
8	Potters Bar Town (N)	2–1	Enfield Town (N)	79
9	Waltham Abbey (N)	2–1	Needham Market (N)	56
10	Leyton (N)	3–1	Redbridge (N)	18
11	Concord Rangers (P)	3–1 (a.e.t.)	Chatham Town (S)	53
12	East Thurrock United (N)	1–1	AFC Hornchurch (P)	82
East Thurrock United advance 5–3 on penalties
13	Billericay Town (P)	2–3	Canvey Island (P)	149
14	Waltham Forest (N)	0–1	Aveley (P)	51
15	Romford (N)	1–2	Tilbury (N)	93
Tilbury removed from competition for fielding an ineligible player
16	Heybridge Swifts (N)	3–2	Brentwood Town (N)	52
17	Maldon & Tiptree (N)	3–1	Great Wakering Rovers (N)	45
18	Dulwich Hamlet (S)	1–0	Ilford (N)	87

Tie	Home team (tier)	Score	Away team (tier)	Att.
19	Maidstone United (P)	1–2	Leatherhead (S)	77
20	Merstham (S)	0–1	Chipstead (S)	56
21	Croydon Athletic (P)	2–2	Folkestone Invicta (P)	69
Folkestone Invicta advance 4–2 on penalties
22	Whyteleafe (S)	0–2	Cray Wanderers (P)	56
23	Tooting & Mitcham United (P)	2–1	Whitstable Town (S)	91
24	Sittingbourne (S)	2–0	Faversham Town (S)	65
25	Tonbridge Angels (P)	2–0	Ramsgate (S)	127
26	Margate (P)	2–5	Thamesmead Town (N)	108
27	Godalming Town (S)	1–4	Fleet Town (S)	75
28	Horsham (P)	5–1	Bognor Regis Town (S)	144
29	Carshalton Athletic (P)	0–1	Eastbourne Town (S)	101
30	Worthing (S)	1–6	Burgess Hill Town (S)	132
31	Walton Casuals (S)	1–0 (a.e.t.)	Sutton United (P)	117
32	Metropolitan Police (S)	3–0	Corinthian-Casuals (S)	64
33	Walton & Hersham (S)	0–3	Kingstonian (P)	168
34	Hastings United (P)	3–3	Whitehawk (S)	191
Hastings United advance 5–4 on penalties

=== Third round ===
Tie	Home team (tier)	Score	Away team (tier)	Att.
35	Cheshunt (N)	1–2	Lowestoft Town (P)	89
36	Harrow Borough (P)	3–0	Leyton (N)	40
37	Waltham Abbey (N)	2–3	Potters Bar Town (N)	72
38	Wealdstone (P)	2–2	Wingate & Finchley (N)	86
Wingate & Finchley advance 5–3 on penalties
39	Canvey Island (P)	0–1	Heybridge Swifts (N)	152
40	Concord Rangers (P)	0–1	Dulwich Hamlet (S)	72
41	Maldon & Tiptree (N)	3–2	East Thurrock United (N)	55
42	Romford (N)	3–2	Aveley (P)	103
43	Cray Wanderers (P)	2–1 (a.e.t.)	Folkestone Invicta (P)	91

Tie	Home team (tier)	Score	Away team (tier)	Att.
44	Leatherhead (S)	1–0	Chipstead (S)	75
45	Sittingbourne (S)	0–2	Tooting & Mitcham United (P)	80
46	Thamesmead Town (N)	1–1	Tonbridge Angels (P)	57
Thamesmead Town advance 5–4 on penalties
47	Horsham (P)	1–2	Hastings United (P)	89
48	Metropolitan Police (S)	5–1	Eastbourne Town (S)	49
49	Kingstonian (P)	1–1	Fleet Town (S)	178
Match abandoned after 74 minutes due to fog
replay	Kingstonian (P)	0–1	Fleet Town (S)	221
50	Walton Casuals (S)	2–0	Burgess Hill Town (S)	57

=== Fourth round ===
Tie	Home team (tier)	Score	Away team (tier)	Att.
51	Maldon & Tiptree (N)	1–0	Potters Bar Town (N)	38
52	Lowestoft Town (P)	4–4	Heybridge Swifts (N)	209
Heybridge Swifts advance 6–5 on penalties
53	Harrow Borough (P)	1–1	Wingate & Finchley (N)	49
Wingate & Finchley advance 13–12 on penalties
54	Dulwich Hamlet (S)	2–1	Romford (N)	79

Tie	Home team (tier)	Score	Away team (tier)	Att.
55	Walton Casuals (S)	0–3	Leatherhead (S)	95
56	Tooting & Mitcham United (P)	1–4	Metropolitan Police (S)	73
57	Thamesmead Town (N)	1–1 †	Cray Wanderers (P)	57
Cray Wanderers advance 5–4 on penalties
58	Hastings United (P)	1–2	Fleet Town (S)	114

=== Quarterfinals ===
8 February 2011 59	Wingate & Finchley (N)	5–2	Metropolitan Police (S)	Harry Abrahams Stadium, Finchley
19:45	L. Smith 10', 88'; Cooper 19'; Burrell 38'; Fowler 78' (pen.)	Report	Field 42'; Noakes 55'	Attendance: 35

22 February 2011 60	Fleet Town (S)	0–2	Maldon & Tiptree (N)	Calthorpe Park, Fleet
19:45		Report	Shave 8'; Deane 51'	Attendance: 75

15 February 2011 61	Heybridge Swifts (N)	0–2	Dulwich Hamlet (S)	Scraley Road, Heybridge
19:30		Report	Powell 86'; Clunis 90+1'	Attendance: 63

22 February 2011 62	Cray Wanderers (P)	0–2	Leatherhead (S)	Hayes Lane, Bromley
19:45		Report	Hutchings 1'; Macleod 67'	Attendance: 92; Referee: Tony Mason (Sidcup)

=== Semifinals ===
8 March 2011 63	Leatherhead (S)	1–5	Dulwich Hamlet (S)	Fetcham Grove, Leatherhead
19:45	Maan 30'	Report	James 5', 68'; Clunis 32'; Powell 40'; Morath-Gibbs 75'	Attendance: 128

8 March 2011 64	Wingate & Finchley (N)	2–1	Maldon & Tiptree (N)	Harry Abrahams Stadium, Finchley
19:45	O'Brien 54', 62'	Report	Own goal 50'	Attendance: 35

=== Final ===
30 March 2011 65	Dulwich Hamlet (S)	0–2	Wingate & Finchley (N)	Imber Court, East Molesey
19:30		Report	Laird 43'; Rifat 65'	Attendance: 502; Referee: Nigel Lugg

== See also ==
- Isthmian League
- 2010–11 Northern Premier League
- 2010–11 Southern Football League
