= List of Havant & Waterlooville F.C. seasons =

Havant & Waterlooville Football Club, an association football club based in Havant, Hampshire, England, was founded in 1998 as a result of Havant Town and Waterlooville merging as one team. In the 1997–98 Southern Football League Southern Division the two teams finished in 12th and 10th respectively, so when they merged Havant & Waterlooville played in the same league the following season. In their inaugural season they won the 1998–99 Southern Football League Southern Division and gained promotion to the Southern League Premier Division where they remained until 2004. At the end of the 2003–04 season the National League System was reorganised and Havant & Waterlooville joined the Football Conference South where they have remained to the present day, in 2015 the league was renamed National League South. The club experience its first relegation at the end of the 2015–16 season finishing in twentieth position in the twenty-four-team National League South.

Since their formation Havant & Waterlooville have also participated in three cup competitions each season, the FA Cup, the FA Trophy and the Hampshire Senior Cup (excluding 2007–08). Their furthest run in the FA Cup saw the club reach the fourth round of the 2007–08 season; the club, being in the Conference South, were drawn away to Premier League side Liverpool, they caused an upset by leading twice before eventually losing 5–2; before being drawn to face Liverpool they had already eliminated three teams from higher divisions: York City (Conference Premier), Notts County (League Two) and Swansea City (League One). Their furthest FA Trophy run has seen the club reach the semi-finals twice in 2002–03 and 2013–14. Their furthest run in the Hampshire Senior Cup saw the club reach the final six times: becoming the runners-up in 2001, 2002 and 2014; and winning the competition in 2016, 2018 and 2019.

As of the 2023–24 season, the club's first team has spent one season in the fifth tier of English football, twenty-two in the sixth and three in the seventh. The table details their achievements in first-team competitions, and records their top goalscorer and average home league attendance, for each season since their first appearance in the Southern League Southern Division in 1998–99.

== Key ==
Key to divisions

- SLS – Southern League Southern
- SLP – Southern League Premier
- Conf S – Conference South
- Nat S – National League South
- ILP – Isthmian League Premier Division
- National – National League

Key to rounds

- QR2 – Second Qualifying Round, etc.
- R1 – First Round, etc.
- QF – Quarter-finals
- SF – Semi-finals
- RU – Runner-up
- W – Winner

Key to positions and symbols

- 1st – Champions
- 2nd – Runners-up
- ↑ – Promoted
- ↓ – Relegated

== Seasons ==
Season	League record										FA Cup	FA Trophy	Hampshire Senior Cup	Average attendance	Top scorers (Note: Includes goals scored in league competition, FA Cup, FA Trophy and Hampshire Senior Cup)	
Season	Tier	Division	P	W	D	L	F	A	Pts	Pos	FA Cup	FA Trophy	Hampshire Senior Cup	Average attendance	Name	Goals
1998–99	7	SLS ↑	42	29	7	6	85	32	94	1st	QR4	R3	SF	359	Steve Tate	30
1999–2000	6	SLP	42	13	13	16	63	68	52	13th	QR2	R2	R2	437	James Taylor	24
2000–01	6	SLP	42	18	9	15	66	54	63	6th	R1	R2	RU	401	Dave Leworthy; Jamie O'Rourke	17
2001–02	6	SLP	42	22	9	11	74	50	75	3rd	QR4	R1	RU	552	James Taylor	32
2002–03	6	SLP	42	15	15	12	67	64	60	8th	R1	SF	SF	431	James Taylor	31
2003–04	7	SLP ↑	42	15	10	17	59	70	55	12th	QR3	R2	QF	466	Chukki Eribenne	19
2004–05	6	Conf S	42	16	7	19	64	69	55	13th	QR2	R4	R3	434	Dean Holdsworth	30
2005–06	6	Conf S	42	21	10	11	64	48	70 (Note: Were deducted three points for breaking an agreement to not play Tony Taggart against his former club Weymouth.)	6th	QR3	QR3	R2	503	Rocky Baptiste	29
2006–07	6	Conf S	42	20	13	9	75	46	73	4th (Note: Lost in the play-off semi-final to Braintree Town 4–2 in a penalty shootout after each leg ended 1–1.)	R1	R1	R3	554	Rocky Baptiste	36
2007–08	6	Conf S	42	19	10	13	59	53	67	7th	R4	QR3	–	743	Rocky Baptiste	19
2008–09	6	Conf S	42	11	15	16	59	58	48	15th	R1	QF	R2	716	Craig Watkins	17
2009–10	6	Conf S	42	19	4	9	65	44	71	6th	QR3	R1	R3	891	Manny Williams	24
2010–11	6	Conf S	42	16	10	16	56	51	58	9th	R1	QR3	QF	656	Wes Fogden	18
2011–12	6	Conf S	42	11	11	20	64	75	44	19th	QR3	QR3	SF	722	Ollie Palmer	15
2012–13	6	Conf S	42	14	16	12	68	60	58	10th	QR2	R2	QF	632	Ollie Palmer	25
2013–14	6	Conf S	42	19	12	11	57	43	69	6th	QR2	SF	RU	563	Nic Ciardini	14
2014–15	6	Conf S	40	21	7	12	61	41	70	5th (Note: Lost in the play-off semi-final to Boreham Wood 4–2 on aggregate.)	R1	R2	R3	660	Scott Donnelly; JJ Hooper	17
2015–16	6	Nat S ↓	42	12	11	19	52	75	47	20th	QR4	R3	W	640	Scott Donnelly; James Hayter	16
2016–17	7	ILP ↑	46	28	10	8	88	43	94	1st	QR3	QR3	R2	763	Jason Prior	17
2017–18	6	Nat S ↑	42	25	11	6	70	30	86	1st	QR4	R1	W	880	Jason Prior	29
2018–19	5	National ↓	46	9	13	24	62	84	40	23rd	QR4	R1	W	1296	Alfie Rutherford	18
2019–20	6	Nat S	34	19	10	5	64	37	67	2nd	QR4	R1	N/A	1398	Jonah Ayunga	17
2020–21	6	Nat S	14	6	2	6	25	21	20	9th	R2	R5	N/A	801	Tommy Wright	8
2021–22	6	Nat S	40	15	12	13	58	55	57	8th	R1	R2	R3	1198	James Roberts; Tommy Wright	8
2022–23	6	Nat S	46	19	12	15	80	70	69	10th	QR4	R2	R2	1005	Muhammadu Faal	21
2023–24	6	Nat S ↓	46	10	7	29	52	92	37	23rd	QR2	R2	R3			
2024–25	7	SLS	42	21	11	10	84	49	74	6th	QR2	R3	QF			
