= 2007–08 Cheltenham Town F.C. season =

Cheltenham Town
2007–08 season
- Manager: John Ward Until 2 October 2007; Keith Downing From 2 October 2007
- Stadium: Whaddon Road
- League One: 19th
- FA Cup: First round
- Football League Cup: First round
- Johnstones Paint Trophy: Southern Quarter Final

This page shows the progress of Cheltenham Town F.C. in the 2007–08 football season. During the season, Cheltenham Town competed in League One in the English league system.

== League table ==
Pos	Team	Pld	W	D	L	GF	GA	GD	Pts	Promotion, qualification or relegation
17	Millwall	46	14	10	22	45	61	−16	52	
18	Yeovil Town	46	14	10	22	38	59	−21	52	
19	Cheltenham Town	46	13	12	21	42	64	−22	51	
20	Crewe Alexandra	46	12	14	20	47	65	−18	50	
21	AFC Bournemouth (R)	46	17	7	22	62	72	−10	48 (Note: Luton and Bournemouth deducted 10 points each for entering administration.)	Relegation to Football League Two

Updated to match(es) played on 3 May 2008. Source: The Football League
Rules for classification: 1) points; 2) goal difference; 3) number of goals scored.
(R) Relegated

== Results ==
=== Football League One ===
11 August 2007 1	Cheltenham Town	1–0	Gillingham	Cheltenham
	Gillespie 24' (red card) 79'		Cox (red card) 57'; Lomas (red card) 76'	Stadium: Whaddon Road; Attendance: 4,008

18 August 2007 2	Millwall	1–0	Cheltenham Town	London
	Spiller 45'			Stadium: The Den; Attendance: 8,671

25 August 2007 3	Cheltenham Town	1–1	Swindon Town	Cheltenham
	Vincent 72'		Sturrock 35'	Stadium: Whaddon Road; Attendance: 5,442

1 September 2007 4	Carlisle United	1–0	Cheltenham Town	Carlisle
	Livesey 90'			Stadium: Brunton Park; Attendance: 6,125

15 September 2007 5	Huddersfield Town	2–3	Cheltenham Town	Huddersfield
	Kamara 48'; Keogh 90'		Spencer 62', 78'; Finnigan 83'	Stadium: Galpharm Stadium; Attendance: 8,756

18 September 2007 6	Cheltenham Town	1–2	Swansea City	Cheltenham
	Vincent 4'		Scotland 50'; Robinson 69'	Stadium: Whaddon Road; Attendance: 4,323

22 September 2007 7	Cheltenham Town	1–1	Tranmere Rovers	Cheltenham
	Caines 50'		Greenacre 34'	Stadium: Whaddon Road; Attendance: 3,742

29 September 2007 8	Doncaster Rovers	2–0	Cheltenham Town	Doncaster
	Guy 19'; Mills 58'			Stadium: Keepmoat Stadium; Attendance: 6,150

2 October 2007 9	Port Vale	3–0	Cheltenham Town	Stoke on Trent
	McGoldrick 21'; Talbot (red card) 24'; Rocastle 68'; Edwards 73'		Lindegaard (red card) 23'	Stadium: Vale Park; Attendance: 3,102

6 October 2007 10	Cheltenham Town	1–1	Oldham Athletic	Cheltenham
	Townsend 45' (pen.); Gill (red card) 70'		Liddell 46'	Stadium: Whaddon Road; Attendance: 3,621

13 October 2007 11	Cheltenham Town	0–3	Nottingham Forest	Cheltenham
			Commons 11', 45', 66'	Stadium: Whaddon Road; Attendance: 5,012

20 October 2007 12	Northampton Town	2–1	Cheltenham Town	Northampton
	Kirk 22'; Gilligan 80'		Spencer 50'	Stadium: Sixfields; Attendance: 5,012

27 October 2007 13	Cheltenham Town	2–2	Crewe Alexandra	Cheltenham
	Wright 85'; Bird 89'		Church 74'; Lowe 78'	Stadium: Whaddon Road; Attendance: 3,605

3 November 2007 14	Walsall	2–0	Cheltenham Town	Walsall
	Mooney 10' (pen.), 56'			Stadium: Banks's Stadium; Attendance: 4,810

6 November 2007 15	Cheltenham Town	1–1	Yeovil Town	Cheltenham
	Caines 89'		Owusu 31'	Stadium: Whaddon Road; Attendance: 3,169

17 November 2007 16	Southend United	2–2	Cheltenham Town	Southend-on-Sea
	Gower 50'; Hammell 56'		Gillespie 14'; Sinclair 25'	Stadium: Roots Hall; Attendance: 7,158

25 November 2007 17	Cheltenham Town	1–0	Leeds United	Cheltenham
	Gillespie 86'			Stadium: Whaddon Road; Attendance: 7,043

8 December 2007 18	Leyton Orient	2–0	Cheltenham Town	London
	Boyd 41'; Melligan 76'			Stadium: Matchroom Stadium; Attendance: 4,156

14 December 2007 19	Cheltenham Town	1–0	Luton Town	Cheltenham
	Lindegaard 2'			Stadium: Whaddon Road; Attendance: 3,702

22 December 2007 20	Cheltenham Town	0–2	Huddersfield Town	Cheltenham
			Booth 14', 66'	Stadium: Whaddon Road; Attendance: 3,998

26 December 2007 21	Swansea City	4–1	Cheltenham Town	Swansea
	Robinson 18', 20'; Bodde 47'; Scotland 78'		Gillespie 82'	Stadium: Liberty Stadium; Attendance: 14,049

29 December 2007 22	Tranmere Rovers	1–0	Cheltenham Town	Birkenhead
	Zola 59'			Stadium: Prenton Park; Attendance: 6,111

2 January 2008 23	Cheltenham Town	1–0	Port Vale	Cheltenham
	Connor 22'			Stadium: Whaddon Road; Attendance: 3,221

12 January 2008 24	Cheltenham Town	1–0	Bournemouth	Cheltenham
	Bird 90'			Stadium: Whaddon Road; Attendance: 3,959

18 January 2008 25	Hartlepool United	0–2	Cheltenham Town	Hartlepool
			Gillespie 11', 84'	Stadium: Victoria Park; Attendance: 4,120

25 January 2008 26	Cheltenham Town	1–0	Carlisle United	Cheltenham
	Gillespie 20'			Stadium: Whaddon Road; Attendance: 4,221

29 January 2008 27	Cheltenham Town	0–1	Millwall	Cheltenham
			Alexander 55'	Stadium: Whaddon Road; Attendance: 3,812

2 February 2008 28	Gillingham	0–0	Cheltenham Town	Gillingham
				Stadium: Priestfield; Attendance: 4,993

5 February 2008 29	Bristol Rovers	2–0	Cheltenham Town	Bristol
	Hinton 40'; Lambert 81'			Stadium: Memorial Stadium; Attendance: 6,780

9 February 2008 30	Cheltenham Town	2–1	Brighton & Hove Albion	Cheltenham
	Russell 89'; Gillespie 90'		Robinson 55'	Stadium: Whaddon Road; Attendance: 3,963

12 February 2008 31	Swindon Town	3–0	Cheltenham Town	Swindon
	Cox 20'; Paynter 41'; Roberts 80'			Stadium: County Ground; Attendance: 6,483

16 February 2008 32	Cheltenham Town	1–1	Hartlepool United	Cheltenham
	Lindegaard 40'		Porter 53'	Stadium: Whaddon Road; Attendance: 3,583

19 February 2008 33	Brighton & Hove Albion	2–1	Cheltenham Town	Brighton
	Murray 80'; Lynch 88'		Brooker 3'	Stadium: Withdean Stadium; Attendance: 4,395

23 February 2008 34	Bournemouth	2–2	Cheltenham Town	Bournemouth
	Gradel 17' (pen.); Bartley 39'		Bird 45'; Brooker 89'; Brown (red card) 90'	Stadium: Fitness First Stadium; Attendance: 4,365

29 February 2008 35	Cheltenham Town	1–1	Southend United	Cheltenham
	Brooker 25'		Bailey 74'	Stadium: Whaddon Road; Attendance: 3,859

8 March 2008 36	Yeovil Town	2–1	Cheltenham Town	Yeovil
	Wright 9' (o.g.); Kirk 73'		Brooker 64'	Stadium: Huish Park; Attendance: 4,588

11 March 2008 37	Leeds United	1–2	Cheltenham Town	Leeds
	Elding 85'		Bird 38'; Russell 63'	Stadium: Elland Road; Attendance: 20,257

15 March 2008 38	Cheltenham Town	1–0	Bristol Rovers	Cheltenham
	Brooker 80'			Stadium: Whaddon Road; Attendance: 5,187

22 March 2008 39	Luton Town	1–1	Cheltenham Town	Luton
	Parkin 24'		Gillespie 81'	Stadium: Kenilworth Road; Attendance: 6,087

24 March 2008 40	Cheltenham Town	1–0	Leyton Orient	Cheltenham
	Connor 47'			Stadium: Whaddon Road; Attendance: 3,988

29 March 2008 41	Cheltenham Town	1–1	Northampton Town	Cheltenham
	Gillespie 39'		Coke 76'	Stadium: Whaddon Road; Attendance: 4,024

5 April 2008 42	Nottingham Forest	3–1	Cheltenham Town	Nottingham
	Agogo 26', 47'; Chambers 45'		Gillespie 20'	Stadium: City Ground; Attendance: 19,860

12 April 2008 43	Cheltenham Town	1–2	Walsall	Cheltenham
	Connor 74'		Mooney 27' (pen.); Gerrard 28'	Stadium: Whaddon Road; Attendance: 4,861

19 April 2008 44	Crewe Alexandra	3–1	Cheltenham Town	Crewe
	Maynard 14', 68', 76'		Gillespie 62'	Stadium: Gresty Road; Attendance: 5,279

26 April 2008 45	Oldham Athletic	2–1	Cheltenham Town	Oldham
	Smalley 16'; Alessandra 87'		Gillespie 50' (pen.)	Stadium: Boundary Park; Attendance: 6,400

3 May 2008 46	Cheltenham Town	2–1	Doncaster Rovers	Cheltenham
	Gillespie 24'; Connor 85'		Green 76'	Stadium: Whaddon Road; Attendance: 6,787

=== FA Cup ===
10 November 2007 Round 1	Cheltenham Town	1–1	Brighton & Hove Albion	Cheltenham
	Gillespie 78'		Loft 90'	Stadium: Whaddon Road; Attendance: 2,984

20 November 2007 Round 1 replay	Brighton & Hove Albion	2–1	Cheltenham Town	Brighton
	El-Abd 18'; Hammond 67' (pen.)		Gillespie 65'	Stadium: Withdean Stadium; Attendance: 3,711

=== League Cup ===
14 August 2007 Round 1	Southend United	4–1 (a.e.t.)	Cheltenham Town	Southend-on-sea
	Bradbury 11' (108), pen.' (117); Barrett 104'		Finnigan 70'	Stadium: Roots Hall; Attendance: 3,084

=== Football League Trophy ===
9 October 2007 Southern Section Round 2	Swindon Town	1–3	Cheltenham Town	Swindon
	Sturrock 56'		Myrie-Williams 21'; Reid 24'; Tozer 68' (o.g.)	Stadium: County Ground; Attendance: 3,765

14 November 2007 Southern Section Quarter Final	Brighton & Hove Albion	4–1	Cheltenham Town	Brighton
	Martot 13'; Forster 37', 87'; Savage 90'		Connor 45'	Stadium: Withdean Stadium; Attendance: 2,490

== Players ==
=== First-team squad ===
Includes all players who were awarded squad numbers during the season.

Note: Flags indicate national team as defined under FIFA eligibility rules; some limited exceptions apply. Players may hold more than one non-FIFA nationality.

No.	Pos.	Nation	Player
1	GK	(England) ENG	Shane Higgs
2	DF	(England) ENG	Jerry Gill
3	DF	(England) ENG	Lee Ridley
4	DF	(England) ENG	Shane Duff
5	DF	(England) ENG	Gavin Caines
6	DF	(England) ENG	Michael Townsend
7	FW	(England) ENG	Steven Gillespie
8	MF	(England) ENG	John Finnigan
9	FW	(England) ENG	Paul Connor
10	FW	(England) ENG	Damian Spencer
11	MF	(England) ENG	Scott Brown
12	GK	(England) ENG	Scott P. Brown
14	MF	(England) ENG	Dave Bird
15	MF	(England) ENG	Ben Gill
16	MF	(England) ENG	Adam Connolly

No.	Pos.	Nation	Player
17	MF	(England) ENG	Andy Lindegaard
18	FW	(England) ENG	Ashley Vincent
19	DF	(England) ENG	Richard Keogh (on loan from Bristol City)
20	DF	(England) ENG	Andy Gallinagh
22	DF	(England) ENG	Alan Wright
23	FW	(England) ENG	Craig Reid
24	DF	(England) ENG	Craig Armstrong
25	MF	(England) ENG	Aaron Ledgister
26	DF	(England) ENG	Michael Wylde
27	MF	(Canada) CAN	Michael D'Agostino (on loan from Blackpool)
28	MF	(England) ENG	Sam Foley
31	GK	(England) ENG	Will Puddy
32	MF	(England) ENG	Alex Russell
33	MF	(England) ENG	Tommy Manship

=== Left club during season ===
Note: Flags indicate national team as defined under FIFA eligibility rules; some limited exceptions apply. Players may hold more than one non-FIFA nationality.

No.	Pos.	Nation	Player
19	FW	(England) ENG	Jennison Myrie-Williams (returned to parent club Bristol City following loan spell)
21	MF	(England) ENG	Dean Sinclair (returned to parent club Charlton Athletic following loan spell)
24	FW	(Cameroon) CMR	Guy Madjo (returned to parent club Crawley Town following loan spell)
29	FW	(England) ENG	Steve Brooker (returned to parent club Bristol City following loan spell)
30	MF	(Ivory Coast) CIV	Sosthene Yao
