= 2002–03 Arsenal F.C. season =

English football club season

Arsenal
2002–03 season
- Chairman: Peter Hill-Wood
- Manager: Arsène Wenger
- Stadium: Highbury
- Premier League: 2nd
- FA Cup: Winners
- League Cup: Third round
- FA Community Shield: Winners
- UEFA Champions League: Second group stage
- Top goalscorer: League: Thierry Henry (24); All: Thierry Henry (32)
- Highest home attendance: 38,164 vs Manchester United (16 April 2003)
- Lowest home attendance: 19,059 vs Sunderland (6 November 2002)
- Average home league attendance: 38,041
Home colours	Away colours	Third colours

The 2002–03 season was Arsenal Football Club's 11th season in the Premier League and their 77th consecutive season in the top flight of English football. The club retained the FA Cup, a feat last achieved by Tottenham Hotspur in 1982, but finished runners-up to Manchester United in the Premier League. In the UEFA Champions League, defeat to Valencia in the second group stage meant Arsenal exited the competition at the same round for the second successive year.

Arsenal began the new campaign as league and cup double winners, and manager Arsène Wenger sought improvement in the Champions League, a competition the club failed in. The retirement of longtime defender Tony Adams meant French midfielder Patrick Vieira was appointed as captain; Pascal Cygan was signed as a replacement in defence. Other recruitments included defensive midfielders Gilberto Silva and Kolo Touré, while goalkeepers Alex Manninger and Richard Wright departed to join Espanyol and Everton respectively.

In the league, a 4–1 win against Leeds United in September meant the club broke the record for scoring in consecutive games (47), and away league games without defeat (22). The club began 2003 in first position, but subsequently floundered; a draw to Aston Villa in April allowed Manchester United to move joint top. A further draw at Bolton Wanderers meant the league championship was, mathematically, out of Arsenal's hands and defeat to Leeds a week after ended their chances of retaining the league. Consolation came in retaining the FA Cup; a solitary goal scored by midfielder Robert Pires was enough to beat Southampton in the 2003 final.

30 different players represented the club in five competitions and there were 17 different goalscorers. Arsenal's top goalscorer was Thierry Henry, who scored 32 goals in 55 appearances.

== Background ==
Arsenal began the 2001–02 season in good form and a win against Liverpool in December 2001 – having gone down to ten men in the first half, helped them move second in the table. A draw against Southampton on 2 February 2002 started a run of 13 consecutive league wins – a new record, beginning against Everton. Arsenal won the league away to Manchester United at Old Trafford on 8 May 2002; the winning goal was scored by Sylvain Wiltord in the second half. The result meant the team were unbeaten away from home all season, and in scoring four goals against Everton on the final day, became the first team to score in every league match they played. Arsenal completed the double, having beaten Chelsea 2–0 in the 2002 FA Cup Final.

Wenger hoped his team's success would begin an era of dominating English football for years to come, citing a "shift of power". He moreover aimed for significant improvement in the Champions League, a competition where the club failed to reach higher than the quarter-finals. Such was Arsenal's impressive form in late summer, Wenger commented that his team could go the entire season undefeated. (Note: Wenger's actual quote was: "It's not impossible. I know it will be difficult for us to go through the season unbeaten. But if we keep the right attitude it's possible we can do it.")

Arsenal's kit sponsorship with O_{2} came into action in the 2002–03 season, replacing the Sega Dreamcast.

=== Transfers ===
Wenger appointed midfielder Patrick Vieira as captain after Tony Adams announced his retirement from football. Defender Lee Dixon left the club after 14 years, retiring at the age of 38. Arsenal did not spend big in the transfer market unlike their rivals and only made subtle additions to the squad: World Cup winner Gilberto Silva and defender Pascal Cygan. English duo Martin Keown and goalkeeper David Seaman extended their stay at the club for two and one more years respectively.

In the January transfer window, defender Matthew Upson was sold to Birmingham City and midfielder Steve Sidwell joined Reading on an undisclosed fee. Goalkeeper Guillaume Warmuz signed a short-term contract with Arsenal, as cover for Seaman, Stuart Taylor and Rami Shaaban.

==== In ====
No.	Position	Player	Transferred from	Fee	Date	Ref
18	DF	Pascal Cygan	Lille	£2,100,000	11 July 2002	
19	MF	Gilberto Silva	Atlético Mineiro	£4,500,000	7 August 2002	
24	GK	Rami Shaaban	Djurgården	Undisclosed	30 August 2002	
20	GK	Guillaume Warmuz	Lens	Undisclosed	31 January 2003	

==== Out ====
No.	Position	Player	Transferred to	Fee	Date	Ref
2	DF	Lee Dixon	Retired		1 July 2002	
6	DF	Tony Adams	Retired		1 July 2002	
37	FW	Carlin Itonga	Released		1 July 2002	
13	GK	Alex Manninger	Espanyol	£960,000	4 July 2002	
40	MF	Rohan Ricketts	Tottenham Hotspur	Free transfer	13 July 2002	
24	GK	Richard Wright	Everton	£3,500,000	24 July 2002	
45	MF	Steve Sidwell	Reading	Undisclosed	20 January 2003	
20	DF	Matthew Upson	Birmingham City	£2,500,000	22 January 2003	

== Pre-season ==
To prepare for the upcoming season, Arsenal played a number of friendlies. On 17 June, they played Stevenage for Paul Fairclough's managerial testimonial, then travelled abroad to play Austrian teams Neuberg, and Rapid Wien, before competing in the Tri-team pre-season tournament, also in Austria, winning matches against both Panathinaikos and Roma. Their last match in Austria consisted of a strong 3–1 win against 1860 Munich, before travelling to Belgium to play Beveren, and eventually back to England, beating Barnet in their final pre-season game.

17 July 2002 Paul Fairclough Testimonial	Stevenage Borough	1–6	Arsenal	Stevenage
20:00 BST	Trott 40'	Report	Juan 27'; Edu 57'; Chilvers 68'; Brown 75'; Paulinho 82'; Barrett 83'	Stadium: Broadhall Way

26 July 2002 Friendly	SV Neuberg (Austria)	2–8	(England) Arsenal	Oberwart
19:00 CEST	Zilić (?)	Report	Aliadière (?); Bergkamp; Edu; Henry (?); Wiltord; Tavlaridis	Stadium: Oberwart Stadium; Attendance: 3,500 or 5,000

27 July 2002 Friendly	Rapid Wien (Austria)	0–0	(England) Arsenal	Eisenstadt
20:00 CEST		Report		Stadium: Linden Stadium

1 August 2002 Tri-team pre-Season Tournament	Arsenal (England)	1–0	(Greece) Panathinaikos	Kapfenberg
19:00 CEST	Wiltord 28'	Report		Stadium: Franz Fekete Stadium

1 August 2002 Tri-team pre-Season Tournament	Arsenal (England)	2–1	(Italy) Roma	Kapfenberg
21:00 CEST	Henry 4'; Aliadière 44'	Report	Batistuta 17'	Stadium: Franz Fekete Stadium

3 August 2002 Friendly	1860 Munich (Germany)	1–3	(England) Arsenal	Innsbruck
19:30 CEST	Agostino 67'	Report	Henry 44', 83', 88'

4 August 2002 Friendly	Beveren (Belgium)	1–1	(England) Arsenal	Beveren
19:30 CEST	Wostijn 55'	Report	Barrett 66'

6 August 2002 Friendly	Barnet	1–2	Arsenal	Barnet
19:45 BST	Arber 60'	Report	Kanu 22'; Upson 80'	Stadium: Underhill Stadium

=== Mid-Season Friendlies ===
During the season, Arsenal played a number of friendlies at their training ground in London Colney. The dates and details of these matches are displayed below.

11 September 2002 Friendly	Arsenal	3–0	Reading	London Colney
	Cygan 25'; Sidwell 73'; Juan 88' (pen.)	Report		Stadium: Arsenal Training Centre

15 October 2002 Friendly	Arsenal	5–1	Queens Park Rangers	London Colney
11:00 BST	Noble 49'; Pires 60'; Tavlaridis 73'; Bentley 80'; Edu 90'	Report	Doudou 17'	Stadium: Arsenal Training Centre

3 December 2002 Friendly	Arsenal	3–0	Millwall	London Colney
	Kanu 61' (pen.), 74'; Jeffers 63'	Report		Stadium: Arsenal Training Centre

14 January 2003 Friendly	Arsenal	2–0	Luton Town	London Colney
	Jeffers 19', 52'	Report		Stadium: Arsenal Training Centre

== FA Community Shield ==
As Premier League and FA Cup winners, Arsenal contested the 2002 FA Community Shield against league runners-up Liverpool. Gilberto, making his debut for Arsenal in the second half as a substitute, scored the winning goal, in a match where the team missed numerous chances.

11 August 2002 Final	Arsenal	1–0	Liverpool	Cardiff
14:00 BST	Gilberto Silva 68'	Report		Stadium: Millennium Stadium; Attendance: 67,337; Referee: Alan Wiley

== Premier League ==
A total of 20 teams competed in the Premier League in the 2002–03 season. Each team played 38 matches; two against every other team and one match at each club's stadium. Three points were awarded for each win, one point per draw, and none for defeats. At the end of the season the top two teams qualified for the group stages of the UEFA Champions League; teams in third and fourth needed to play a qualifier.

=== August–October ===
"We're all fighting for second place now. It was demoralising. They just pass and move, pass and move. You find yourself working for nothing."

— Leeds midfielder Olivier Dacourt, 28 September 2002

Arsenal began the season with a 2–0 home victory against promoted Birmingham City; goals from Thierry Henry and Sylvain Wiltord extended the club's winning run to fourteen matches – a new top-flight record. A late equaliser by Wiltord in their next match at West Ham United earned Arsenal a point, having trailed 2–0 in the first half. Three days later, a 5–2 win against West Bromwich Albion moved Arsenal to the top of the league table. Although they drew to Chelsea at Stamford Bridge, having lost captain Vieira through a sending-off, a win against Manchester City meant Arsenal leapfrogged local rivals Tottenham Hotspur to first position. A 3–0 win at Charlton Athletic on 15 September 2002 pleased Wenger, who indicated after the match the league was theirs to lose: "We know we can win the league. We know we can be stronger. At this stage last season we were not as good as we are now." Striker Kanu scored a stoppage time winner against Bolton Wanderers to win their eleventh successive home game.

At Elland Road, Leeds United hosted Arsenal on 28 September 2002. Goals from Kolo Touré and Henry and a brace from Kanu ensured Arsenal eclipsed Nottingham Forest's record of 22 away league games without defeat and scored in 47 consecutive league matches, breaking Chesterfield Town's achievement. Wenger hailed the performance as "edging nearer to perfection", adding it evoked memories of the Ajax team in the 1970s: "We are playing great, 'Total Football'. Danger comes from everywhere." Leeds manager Terry Venables agreed: "Manchester United have been exceptional for 10 years – but I've not seen anything as good as that."

Arsenal started October with a 3–1 win against Sunderland, breaking Manchester United's Premier League record of 30 matches unbeaten. They however suffered their first defeat of the season, against Everton; teenager Wayne Rooney scored from long range in the last minute of the match. Wenger used his post-match press conference to praise the striker: "At that age, Rooney is already a complete footballer. The guy can play. He's the best English under-20 I've seen since I came here [in 1996]." In spite of dominating their next match against Blackburn Rovers – "27 goal attempts, 14 on target," Arsenal were beaten 2–1; the winning goal was scored by Dwight Yorke in the second half. It was the team's third consecutive defeat in all competitions, their worst run since November 2000, and moved league leaders Liverpool four points clear at the top of the table.

=== November–February ===
A Steve Marlet own goal gave Arsenal a much-needed 1–0 win against Fulham, ceasing their run of four defeats on 3 November 2002. Another 1–0 win, this time against Newcastle United moved Arsenal one point behind leaders Liverpool. Vieira's performance in particular was plauded in The Guardian as a "demonstration of tackling, control, awareness and movement that was exceptional even by his standards." In the North London derby on 16 November 2002, Arsenal beat Tottenham Hotpsur 3–0 to go back at the top of the league table. The opening goal, scored by Henry was later voted the Goal of the Season by viewers of ITV's The Premiership, having picked up the ball from Arsenal's side of the pitch and running past the opposition defence to shoot past goalkeeper Kasey Keller. At St Mary's Stadium, Arsenal lost 3–2 to Southampton; striker James Beattie scored twice against an Arsenal defence, who conceded three goals in total for the first time since May 2001. Defender Sol Campbell had been sent off in the match, and was suspended for a further game, against Manchester United. Arsenal ended the month with a 3–1 victory over visitors Aston Villa; midfielder Robert Pires scoring for the second successive league match and Henry adding a further two goals.

Arsenal faced Manchester United at Old Trafford on 7 December 2002; the home team had beaten title challengers Liverpool the previous weekend. Manchester United opened the scoring in the 21st minute – a poor clearance by Cygan allowed Juan Sebastián Verón to score. Arsenal goalkeeper Rami Shaaban was substituted before the start of the second half, having pulled a thigh muscle. He was replaced by Stuart Taylor, who was helpless to prevent Paul Scholes from scoring a second goal, 15 minutes before the final whistle. A 1–1 draw at Tottenham Hotspur was followed by a win against Middlesbrough; a goal apiece from Campbell and Pires meant Arsenal were top of the table on Christmas. On Boxing Day, Arsenal came from a goal down to beat West Brom 2–1; in doing so, they extended their lead at the top to four points. Three days later, Arsenal's lead was increased to five points, having drawn with Liverpool.

In spite of conceding two late goals against Chelsea, Arsenal won by a solitary goal on New Year's Day to maintain their lead. Two goals from Henry against Birmingham City took his total for the club to 100 goals in all competitions; Wenger declared the display – a 4–0 win, as his team's best since beating Leeds United in September. Henry scored a hat-trick for Arsenal against West Ham United on 19 January 2003 but the team drew at Liverpool in spite of a polished performance; Emile Heskey headered the ball into the net, scoring for the home team after 90 minutes. On 1 February 2003, Pires scored a late goal against Fulham, extending Arsenal's lead to six points at the top. This was followed by a 1–1 draw against Newcastle United; manager Sir Bobby Robson after the game criticised referee Neale Barry for his decision to send off midfielder Laurent Robert and Dennis Bergkamp's role in the dismissal, suggesting he "wasn't trying to play the ball to anybody. He kicked the ball against Laurent – I've seen other players do that and I don't like it." Arsenal beat Manchester City 5–1 in their final trip to Maine Road on 22 February 2003. The first four goals, all scored before the half-hour, came at a time when "[Alex] Ferguson ordered the radio to be switched before they reached Old Trafford, presumably in ghastly silence."

=== March–May ===
"I've always plumped for Arsenal, until now. It seemed to me earlier in the season they could score goals whenever they wanted. But they've seen all these points being lost and, without sitting on the fence, I really don't have a clue now. It's all up for grabs."

— Manager Graham Taylor, 5 April 2003

On 2 March 2003, Arsenal opened up an eight-point lead at the top of the table, winning 2–0 against Charlton Athletic. The result was enough for Irish bookmaker Paddy Power to pay out on punters backing Arsenal to retain their lead, despite Manchester United having a game in hand. The gap was cut to two points after Arsenal suffered their first defeat in 2003, against Blackburn Rovers. By the time Arsenal played Everton on 23 March 2003, they were displaced at the top of the table by Manchester United. A goal by Vieira moved the team two points clear once more.

An own goal scored by Touré meant Freddie Ljungberg's opener against Aston Villa was cancelled out and the match ended in a draw, albeit helping Arsenal back to first position on goal difference. Leading up to the potential championship decider against Manchester United on 16 April 2003, Wenger was adamant his team were mentally ready to retain the title: "We want to be a team who makes history. That's what's really driving us on. We are not worrying about United too much. We are just concentrating on expressing our togetherness, our mental strength and our qualities. We have enough players who can win this game." Having conceded a first half goal scored by Ruud van Nistelrooy, Arsenal overturned Manchester United's lead before Ryan Giggs equalised for the away team. The match ended 2–2; Campbell was sent off for elbowing Ole Gunnar Solskjær and was banned the rest of the season, whereas Vieira limped off with an injury. Although the result helped Manchester United move back top, they had played one game more than Arsenal. Arsenal won their next match at Middlesbrough, but squandered a two-goal lead away to Bolton Wanderers in the last ten minutes. The result, "a big blow" for Arsenal's title hopes, meant the championship was now in Manchester United's favour.

With Manchester United beating Charlton Athletic 4–1 on 3 May 2003, Arsenal, a day later, needed a win against Leeds United to restore any hope of finishing top of the league. In a five-goal match, an 88th-minute goal by Mark Viduka ensured Leeds United's survival in the top division and Manchester United's recapture of the Premiership. Wenger revoked suggestion that the league campaign was a "failure", arguing his team were consistent:

Of course we want to win the league but I think the most difficult thing for the club is to be consistent and we have been remarkably consistent. We are in the cup final; we lose the league to a team who spends 50% more money every year – last year they bought a player for £30m pounds when they lost the championship. They will do the same next year and we [have] done miracles just to fight with them.

Arsenal won their final two matches of the league season, against Southampton – where Pires and Jermaine Pennant both scored a hat-trick – and Sunderland, ending the season with 78 points.

18 August 2002 1	Arsenal	2–0	Birmingham City	London
16:05 BST	Henry 9'; Wiltord 24'	Report	Purse (yellow card) 24'; Cissé (yellow card) 69' (yellow-red card) 73'	Stadium: Highbury; Attendance: 38,018; Referee: Mike Riley

24 August 2002 2	West Ham United	2–2	Arsenal	London
15:00 BST	J. Cole 44'; Kanouté 53'; Řepka (yellow card) 63'; Moncur (yellow card) 87'	Report	Bergkamp (yellow card) 18'; Edu (yellow card) 42'; A. Cole (yellow card) 53'; Henry 65'; Keown (yellow card) 68'; Vieira (yellow card) 75'; Wiltord 88'	Stadium: Boleyn Ground; Attendance: 35,048; Referee: Neale Barry

27 August 2002 3	Arsenal	5–2	West Bromwich Albion	London
20:00 BST	Cole 3'; Lauren 21'; Edu (yellow card) 23'; Wiltord 24', 77'; Keown (yellow card) 67'; Campbell (yellow card) 72'; Aliadière 90'	Report	McInnes (yellow card) 19'; Clement (yellow card) 39'; Dobie 52'; Roberts 87'	Stadium: Highbury; Attendance: 37,920; Referee: Paul Durkin

1 September 2002 4	Chelsea	1–1	Arsenal	London
16:05 BST	Lampard (yellow card) 7'; Le Saux (yellow card) 12'; Zola 34' de Lucas (yellow card) 42'; Grønkjær (yellow card) 54'; Melchiot (yellow card) 82'	Report	Vieira (yellow card) 33' (yellow-red card) 50'; Wiltord (yellow card) 55'; Touré 60'	Stadium: Stamford Bridge; Attendance: 40,037; Referee: Andy D'Urso

10 September 2002 5	Arsenal	2–1	Manchester City	London
20:00 BST	Wiltord 26'; Vieira (yellow card) 37'; Henry 42'	Report	Anelka 29'; Distin (yellow card) 35'; Benarbia (yellow card) 22' (yellow-red card) 84'	Stadium: Highbury; Attendance: 37,878; Referee: Clive Wilkes

14 September 2002 6	Charlton Athletic	0–3	Arsenal	London
15:00 BST		Report	Keown (yellow card) 14'; A. Cole (yellow card) 26'; Henry 44'; Wiltord 67'; Luzhnyi (yellow card) 80'; Edu 88'	Stadium: The Valley; Attendance: 26,080; Referee: Steve Dunn

21 September 2002 7	Arsenal	2–1	Bolton Wanderers	London
15:00 BST	Keown (yellow card) 19'; Henry 26'; Kanu 90+3'	Report	Farrelly 47'; Holdsworth (yellow card) 55'; Campo (yellow card) 8' (yellow-red card) 79'; Jääskeläinen (yellow card) 82'	Stadium: Highbury; Attendance: 37,974; Referee: David Pugh

28 September 2002 8	Leeds United	1–4	Arsenal	Leeds
12:00 BST	Smith (yellow card) 6'; Dacourt (yellow card) 17'; Bakke (yellow card) 75'; Bowyer (yellow card) 76'; Kewell 85'	Report	Kanu 9', 86'; Touré 20'; Vieira (yellow card) 40'; Henry 46'; Campbell (yellow card) 48'	Stadium: Elland Road; Attendance: 40,199; Referee: Alan Wiley

6 October 2002 9	Arsenal	3–1	Sunderland	London
14:00 BST	Kanu 3', 9'; Vieira 45+2'	Report	Craddock 83'	Stadium: Highbury; Attendance: 37,902; Referee: David Elleray

19 October 2002 10	Everton	2–1	Arsenal	Liverpool
15:00 BST	Radzinski 22'; Weir (yellow card) 39'; Pembridge (yellow card) 45+1'; Linderoth (yellow card) 89'; Rooney 90'	Report	Ljungberg 8'; Edu (yellow card) 90+4'	Stadium: Goodison Park; Attendance: 39,038; Referee: Uriah Rennie

26 October 2002 11	Arsenal	1–2	Blackburn Rovers	London
15:00 BST	Edu 45'; Henry (yellow card) 83'	Report	Edu 6' (o.g.); Østenstad (yellow card) 37'; Johansson (yellow card) 45'; Yorke 51'; Flitcroft (yellow card) 70' (yellow-red card) 79'	Stadium: Highbury; Attendance: 38,064; Referee: Graham Barber

3 November 2002 12	Fulham	0–1	Arsenal	London
14:00 GMT	Djetou (yellow card) 49'	Report	Marlet 31' (o.g.); Cygan (yellow card) 35'; Edu (yellow card) 67'	Stadium: Loftus Road; Attendance: 18,800; Referee: Jeff Winter

9 November 2002 13	Arsenal	1–0	Newcastle United	London
15:00 GMT	Wiltord 25'	Report	Griffin (yellow card) 57'; Hugo Viana (yellow card) 68'	Stadium: Highbury; Attendance: 38,121; Referee: Mike Dean

16 November 2002 14	Arsenal	3–0	Tottenham Hotspur	London
15:00 GMT	Henry 13'; Ljungberg 55'; Wiltord 71'	Report	Davies (yellow card) 23' (yellow-red card) 27'; Poyet (yellow card) 49'	Stadium: Highbury; Attendance: 38,152; Referee: Mike Riley

23 November 2002 15	Southampton	3–2	Arsenal	Southampton
15:00 GMT	Beattie 45+3', 58' (pen.); Delgado 67'; Marsden (yellow card) 70'	Report	Bergkamp 36'; Campbell (red card) 57'; A. Cole (yellow card) 60'; Pires 79'; Vieira (yellow card) 90+3'	Stadium: St Mary's Stadium; Attendance: 31,797; Referee: Paul Durkin

30 November 2002 16	Arsenal	3–1	Aston Villa	London
15:00 GMT	Pires 17'; Henry 49', 82' (pen.); Luzhnyi (yellow card) 54'; Henry (yellow card) 87'	Report	Hitzlsperger 64', (yellow card) 69'; Taylor (yellow card) 84'; Dublin (yellow card) 90+2'	Stadium: Highbury; Attendance: 38,090; Referee: Graham Barber

7 December 2002 17	Manchester United	2–0	Arsenal	Manchester
12:15 GMT	Verón 22'; Scholes 73'	Report		Stadium: Old Trafford; Attendance: 67,650; Referee: Dermot Gallagher

15 December 2002 18	Tottenham Hotspur	1–1	Arsenal	London
14:00 GMT	Ziege 11'	Report	Pires 45+1' (pen.)	Stadium: White Hart Lane; Attendance: 36,076; Referee: Neale Barry

21 December 2002 19	Arsenal	2–0	Middlesbrough	London
15:00 GMT	Campbell 45+1'; Pires 90+1'	Report		Stadium: Highbury; Attendance: 38,003; Referee: Steve Dunn

26 December 2002 20	West Bromwich Albion	1–2	Arsenal	West Bromwich
14:00 GMT	Dichio 3'	Report	Jeffers 48'; Henry 85'	Stadium: The Hawthorns; Attendance: 27,025; Referee: Graham Poll

29 December 2002 21	Arsenal	1–1	Liverpool	London
16:05 GMT	Henry 79' (pen.)	Report	Murphy 70' (pen.)	Stadium: Highbury; Attendance: 38,074; Referee: Jeff Winter

1 January 2003 22	Arsenal	3–2	Chelsea	London
15:00 GMT	Desailly 9' (o.g.) van Bronckhorst 81'; Henry 82'	Report	Stanić 85'; Petit 86'	Stadium: Highbury; Attendance: 38,096; Referee: Uriah Rennie

12 January 2003 23	Birmingham City	0–4	Arsenal	Birmingham
16:05 GMT		Report	Henry 6', 70'; Pires 29'; Lauren 67'	Stadium: St Andrew's; Attendance: 29,505; Referee: Steve Bennett

19 January 2003 24	Arsenal	3–1	West Ham United	London
14:00 GMT	Henry 14' (pen.), 71', 86'	Report	Defoe 40'	Stadium: Highbury; Attendance: 38,053; Referee: Mike Dean

29 January 2003 25	Liverpool	2–2	Arsenal	Liverpool
20:00 GMT	Riise 52'; Heskey 90+1'	Report	Pires 9'; Bergkamp 63'	Stadium: Anfield; Attendance: 43,668; Referee: Mark Halsey

1 February 2003 26	Arsenal	2–1	Fulham	London
15:00 GMT	Pires 17', 90+1'	Report	Malbranque 29'	Stadium: Highbury; Attendance: 38,050; Referee: Eddie Wolstenholme

9 February 2003 27	Newcastle United	1–1	Arsenal	Newcastle upon Tyne
16:05 GMT	Robert 53'	Report	Henry 27'	Stadium: St James' Park; Attendance: 52,157; Referee: Neale Barry

22 February 2003 28	Manchester City	1–5	Arsenal	Manchester
15:00 GMT	Anelka 87'	Report	Bergkamp 4'; Pires 12'; Henry 15'; Campbell 19'; Vieira 53'	Stadium: Maine Road; Attendance: 34,960; Referee: Paul Durkin

2 March 2003 29	Arsenal	2–0	Charlton Athletic	London
12:00 GMT	Jeffers 26'; Pires 45+1'	Report		Stadium: Highbury; Attendance: 38,015; Referee: Rob Styles

15 March 2003 30	Blackburn Rovers	2–0	Arsenal	Blackburn
15:00 GMT	Duff 22'; Tugay 52'	Report		Stadium: Ewood Park; Attendance: 29,840; Referee: Steve Bennett

23 March 2003 31	Arsenal	2–1	Everton	London
16:05 GMT	Cygan 8'; Vieira 64'	Report	Rooney 56'	Stadium: Highbury; Attendance: 38,042; Referee: Alan Wiley

5 April 2003 32	Aston Villa	1–1	Arsenal	Birmingham
15:00 BST	Touré 71' (o.g.)	Report	Ljungberg 56'	Stadium: Villa Park; Attendance: 42,602; Referee: Uriah Rennie

16 April 2003 33	Arsenal	2–2	Manchester United	London
20:00 BST	Henry 51', 62'	Report	van Nistelrooy 24'; Giggs 63'	Stadium: Highbury; Attendance: 38,164; Referee: Mark Halsey

19 April 2003 34	Middlesbrough	0–2	Arsenal	Middlesbrough
15:00 BST		Report	Wiltord 48'; Henry 82'	Stadium: Riverside Stadium; Attendance: 34,724; Referee: David Elleray

26 April 2003 35	Bolton Wanderers	2–2	Arsenal	Bolton
12:30 BST	Djorkaeff 74'; Keown 84' (o.g.); Laville (red card) 90+2'	Report	Wiltord 47'; Pires 56'	Stadium: Reebok Stadium; Attendance: 27,253; Referee: Andy D'Urso

4 May 2003 36	Arsenal	2–3	Leeds United	London
16:05 BST	Henry 31'; Bergkamp 63'	Report	Kewell 5'; Harte 48'; Viduka 88'	Stadium: Highbury; Referee: Alan Wiley

7 May 2003 37	Arsenal	6–1	Southampton	London
19:45 BST	Pires 8', 22', 46'; Pennant 15', 18', 25'	Report	Tessem 34'	Stadium: Highbury; Attendance: 38,052; Referee: Uriah Rennie

11 May 2003 38	Sunderland	0–4	Arsenal	Sunderland
15:00 BST		Report	Henry 7'; Ljungberg 39', 78', 88'	Stadium: Stadium of Light; Attendance: 40,188; Referee: Paul Durkin

=== Classification ===
Pos	Team	Pld	W	D	L	GF	GA	GD	Pts	Qualification or relegation
1	Manchester United (C)	38	25	8	5	74	34	+40	83	Qualification for the Champions League group stage
2	Arsenal	38	23	9	6	85	42	+43	78	Qualification for the Champions League group stage
3	Newcastle United	38	21	6	11	63	48	+15	69	Qualification for the Champions League third qualifying round
4	Chelsea	38	19	10	9	68	38	+30	67	Qualification for the Champions League third qualifying round
5	Liverpool	38	18	10	10	61	41	+20	64	Qualification for the UEFA Cup first round (Note: Since Liverpool qualified for the UEFA Cup via the league, their place in the UEFA Cup as League Cup winners reverted to the league and was awarded to Blackburn Rovers as the highest-placed team not already qualified for European competitions.)

Source: Premier League
Rules for classification: 1) points; 2) goal difference; 3) number of goals scored.
(C) Champions

==== Results summary ====
Overall								Home						Away					
Pld	W	D	L	GF	GA	GD	Pts	W	D	L	GF	GA	GD	W	D	L	GF	GA	GD
38	23	9	6	85	42	+43	78	15	2	2	47	20	+27	8	7	4	38	22	+16

==== Results by round ====
Round	1	2	3	4	5	6	7	8	9	10	11	12	13	14	15	16	17	18	19	20	21	22	23	24	25	26	27	28	29	30	31	32	33	34	35	36	37	38
Ground	H	A	H	A	H	A	H	A	H	A	H	A	H	H	A	H	A	A	H	A	H	H	A	H	A	H	A	A	H	A	H	A	H	A	A	H	H	A
Result	W	D	W	D	W	W	W	W	W	L	L	W	W	W	L	W	L	D	W	W	D	W	W	W	D	W	D	W	W	L	W	D	D	W	D	L	W	W
Position	3	4	1	2	1	1	1	1	1	2	2	2	2	1	1	1	1	1	1	1	1	1	1	1	1	1	1	1	1	1	1	1	2	2	2	2	2	2

A = Away; H = Home; W = Win; D = Draw; L = Loss

== FA Cup ==
Arsenal entered the competition in the third round, receiving a bye as a Premier League club. Their opening match was a 2–0 home win against Oxford United on 4 January 2003. Bergkamp scored his 100th goal for the club and an own goal by defender Scott McNiven ensured progression to the next round. Arsenal faced non-league side Farnborough Town but the match switched from Farnborough's ground at Cherrywood Road to Highbury due to concerns over safety. Farnborough as the home team began the match in disastrous fashion, conceding a goal scored by Campbell in the 19th minute, and going down to ten men after Christian Lee was sent off for a professional foul. Francis Jeffers scored twice before Rocky Baptiste added a consolation, beating Cygan for pace and despite having his first shot saved by goalkeeper Taylor, he managed to lift the ball over him and into the net. Lauren and Bergkamp each scored in the final 15 minutes to give Arsenal a 5–1 victory.

Arsenal's fifth-round match was away to league rivals Manchester United at Old Trafford on 16 February 2003. After Giggs missed the chance to score past an open goal, midfielder Edu gave Arsenal the lead through a free kick which took a deflection off David Beckham's shoulder. Wiltord scored the second goal of the match in the 52nd minute, running onto a pass from Edu and side-footing the ball past goalkeeper Fabien Barthez. Vieira said of the performance: "We knew when we lost here in the league that we had lost the battle in midfield. We had to put that right, and we did." In the sixth round, Arsenal were drawn at home to Chelsea in a repeat of the previous season's final. Chelsea defender John Terry put his team ahead with a header from a set piece before Arsenal responded through Jeffers and Henry. Frank Lampard scored a late equaliser for the visiting team meaning the match was replayed at Stamford Bridge. An own goal by Terry and a strike by Wiltord in the space of seven minutes during the replay gave Arsenal an early lead against Chelsea. Despite going down to ten men after Cygan was sent off and Terry scoring from a header, the away team scored a third goal through Lauren to ensure progression into the semi-finals. In the semi-final against Sheffield United on 13 April 2003 at Old Trafford, Ljungberg scored the winning goal to help Arsenal reach their third successive FA Cup final appearance. The match was remembered for Seaman, who on his 1,000th appearance in senior football produced a late save to deny Sheffield United from equalising.

In the 2003 FA Cup Final against Southampton, a goal from Pires, scored in the first half was enough to ensure Arsenal won their ninth FA Cup, becoming the first team to retain the trophy in over 20 years. Wenger commented after the game that his team "got the trophy we wanted" while defender Martin Keown said the FA Cup win was "the best ever". Winning captain David Seaman felt the disappointment of losing out to Manchester United in the league spurred the team on. The game was Seaman's final one for the club.

4 January 2003 Third round	Arsenal	2–0	Oxford United	London
15:00 GMT	Bergkamp 15'; McNiven 67' (o.g.)	Report		Stadium: Highbury; Attendance: 35,432; Referee: Clive Wilkes

25 January 2003 Fourth round	Farnborough Town	1–5	Arsenal	London
15:00 GMT	Baptiste 71'	Report	Campbell 19'; Jeffers 23', 68'; Bergkamp 74'; Lauren 78'	Stadium: Highbury; Attendance: 35,108; Referee: Alan Wiley

15 February 2003 Fifth round	Manchester United	0–2	Arsenal	Manchester
12:15 GMT		Report	Edu 35'; Wiltord 52'	Stadium: Old Trafford; Attendance: 67,209; Referee: Jeff Winter

8 March 2003 Quarter-finals	Arsenal	2–2	Chelsea	London
17:15 GMT	Jeffers 37'; Henry 45'	Report	Terry 4'; Lampard 84'	Stadium: Highbury; Attendance: 38,104; Referee: Paul Durkin

25 March 2003 Quarter-finals replay	Chelsea	1–3	Arsenal	London
19:45 GMT	Terry 79'	Report	Terry 24' (o.g.); Wiltord 33'; Lauren 82'	Stadium: Stamford Bridge; Attendance: 41,456; Referee: David Elleray

13 April 2003 Semi-finals	Arsenal	1–0	Sheffield United	Manchester
13:30 GMT	Ljungberg 34'	Report		Stadium: Old Trafford; Attendance: 59,170; Referee: Graham Poll

17 May 2003 Final	Arsenal	1–0	Southampton	Cardiff
15:00 GMT	Pires 38'	Report		Stadium: Millennium Stadium; Attendance: 73,726; Referee: Graham Barber

== League Cup ==
Together with the other clubs playing in European football, Arsenal entered the Football League Cup in the third round, where they were drawn at home to Premier League club Sunderland. Although Arsenal went two goals ahead in the first half, Sunderland responded, scoring three times in 15 minutes. The result was Wenger's fifth defeat in six matches.

6 November 2002 Third round	Arsenal	2–3	Sunderland	London
19:45 GMT	Pires 12'; Jeffers 33'	Report	Kyle 56'; Stewart 70', 72'	Stadium: Highbury; Attendance: 19,059; Referee: Alan Wiley

== UEFA Champions League ==
=== Group stage ===
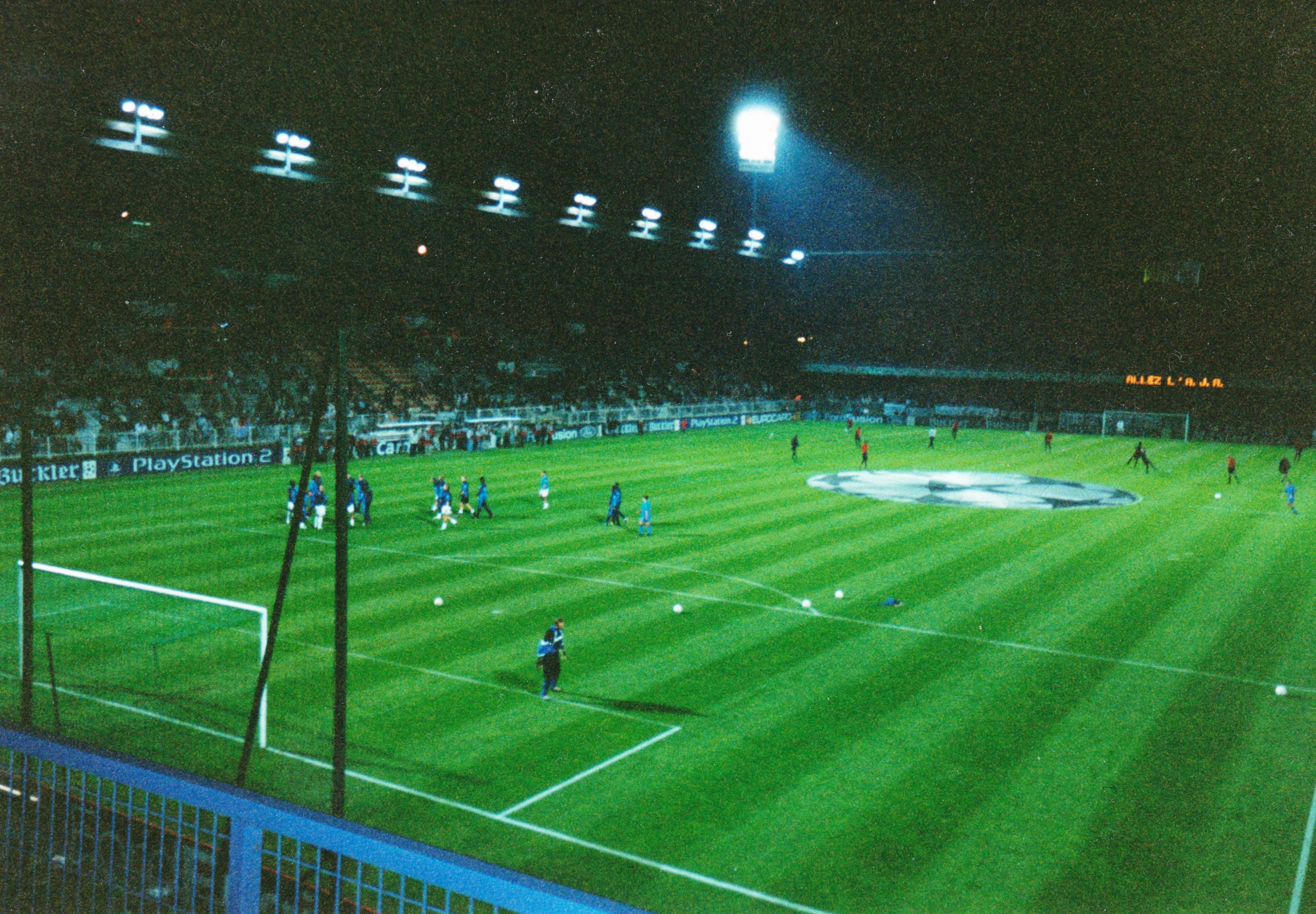
Arsenal greet their fans before their game at Auxerre, 2 October 2002

Arsenal were drawn in Group A, along with German club Borussia Dortmund, Dutch champions PSV Eindhoven and French side Auxerre. A deflected goal by Bergkamp and a counterattack, finished off by Ljungberg on his comeback from injury gave Arsenal the perfect start in the group stages, at home to Borussia Dortmund. At the Philips Stadion, Arsenal produced an impressive display against PSV, winning 4–0. It was their first win in European football away from home in 19 months and the match set a new club record, as Gilberto scored the fastest goal in the competition at 20.07 seconds.

Against Auxerre, Gilberto scored for the second successive matchday to take Arsenal to nine points, but goals from Olivier Kapo and Khalilou Fadiga in the return game inflicted Arsenal's first defeat in the Champions League. In spite of taking the lead against Borussia Dortmund on Matchday 5, Arsenal conceded two goals to lose 2–1. A fourth straight defeat represented the club's worst run in 19 years but with PSV beating Auxerre, Arsenal qualified for the second group stage with a game to spare – that match ending in a 0–0 draw against PSV.

Pos	Team	Pld	W	D	L	GF	GA	GD	Pts	Qualification
1	(England) Arsenal	6	3	1	2	9	4	+5	10	Advance to second group stage
2	(Germany) Borussia Dortmund	6	3	1	2	8	7	+1	10	Advance to second group stage
3	(France) Auxerre	6	2	1	3	4	7	−3	7	Transfer to UEFA Cup
4	(Netherlands) PSV Eindhoven	6	1	3	2	5	8	−3	6	

Source: RSSSF

17 September 2002 1	Arsenal (England)	2–0	(Germany) Borussia Dortmund	London, England
20:45 CEST	Bergkamp 62'; Ljungberg 77'	Report	(yellow card) 14' Dedê	Stadium: Highbury; Attendance: 34,907; Referee: Anders Frisk (Sweden)

25 September 2002 2	PSV Eindhoven (Netherlands)	0–4	(England) Arsenal	Eindhoven, Netherlands
20:45 CEST	Ooijer (yellow card) 20'; Vennegoor of Hesselink (yellow card) 55'	Report	1' Gilberto Silva; (yellow card) 34' Lauren; 66' Ljungberg; 81', 90+2' Henry	Stadium: Philips Stadion; Attendance: 24,000; Referee: Ľuboš Micheľ (Slovakia)

2 October 2002 3	Auxerre (France)	0–1	(England) Arsenal	Auxerre, France
20:45 CEST	Jaurès (yellow card) 77'	Report	48' Gilberto	Stadium: Stade de l'Abbé-Deschamps; Attendance: 21,000; Referee: Frank De Bleeckere (Belgium)

22 October 2002 4	Arsenal (England)	1–2	(France) Auxerre	London, England
20:45 CET	Kanu 53'; Campbell (yellow card) 68'; Vieira (yellow card) 87'	Report	8' Kapo; 27' Fadiga; (yellow card) 42' Boumsong; (yellow card) 56' Faye	Stadium: Highbury; Attendance: 35,206; Referee: Domenico Messina (Italy)

30 October 2002 5	Borussia Dortmund (Germany)	2–1	(England) Arsenal	Dortmund, Germany
20:45 CET	Rosický 38', 62' (pen.); Reuter (yellow card) 77'	Report	18' Henry	Stadium: Westfalenstadion; Attendance: 52,000; Referee: Manuel Mejuto González (Spain)

12 November 2002 6	Arsenal (England)	0–0	(Netherlands) PSV Eindhoven	London, England
20:45 CET	(yellow card) 29' (red card) 35' Touré	Report	(yellow card) 25' Vogel; (yellow card) 45+1' Ooijer; (yellow card) 65' Hofland; (yellow card) 90' Vennegoor of Hesselink; (yellow card) 90+2' van Bommel	Stadium: Highbury; Attendance: 35,274; Referee: Tom Henning Øvrebø (Norway)

=== Second group stage ===
Henry scored his first hat-trick in Europe for Arsenal against Roma on 27 November 2002 with the player stating; "It's wonderful to score a hat-trick but it's even more important that I did so in a game we've won." The result was followed with four consecutive draws – three at home against Roma, Valencia and Ajax. Arsenal only needed a draw to progress into the knockout stages, but lost 2–1 to Valencia at the Mestalla on 19 March 2003. Reflecting later on the Champions League campaign, Wenger commented that "we lost our qualification at home".

Pos	Team	Pld	W	D	L	GF	GA	GD	Pts	Qualification
1	(Spain) Valencia	6	2	3	1	5	6	−1	9	Advance to knockout stage
2	(Netherlands) Ajax	6	1	5	0	6	5	+1	8	Advance to knockout stage
3	(England) Arsenal	6	1	4	1	6	5	+1	7	
4	(Italy) Roma	6	1	2	3	7	8	−1	5	

Source: RSSSF

27 November 2002 7	Roma (Italy)	1–3	(England) Arsenal	Rome, Italy
20:45 CET	Cassano 4'; Samuel (yellow card) 41'; Emerson (yellow card) 74'; Batistuta (yellow card) 80'	Report	6', 70', 75' Henry	Stadium: Stadio Olimpico; Attendance: 70,000; Referee: Ľuboš Micheľ (Slovakia)

10 December 2002 8	Arsenal (England)	0–0	(Spain) Valencia	London, England
20:45 CET		Report	(red card) 72' Angulo	Stadium: Highbury; Attendance: 34,793; Referee: Kim Milton Nielsen (Denmark)

18 February 2002 9	Arsenal (England)	1–1	(Netherlands) Ajax	London, England
20:45 CET	Wiltord 5'; Pires (yellow card) 90+1'	Report	17' de Jong; (yellow card) 56' Pasanen; (yellow card) 79' Lobonț; (yellow card) 82' Boukhari	Stadium: Highbury; Attendance: 35,427; Referee: Lucílio Batista (Portugal)

26 February 2003 10	Ajax (Netherlands)	0–0	(England) Arsenal	Amsterdam, Netherlands
20:45 CET		Report	(yellow card) 39' Cole; (yellow card) 75' Vieira	Stadium: Amsterdam Arena; Attendance: 51,025; Referee: Valentin Ivanov (Russia)

11 March 2003 11	Arsenal (England)	1–1	(Italy) Roma	London, England
20:45 CET	Vieira 12' van Bronckhorst (yellow card) 29'	Report	(yellow card) 28' Cassano; (yellow card) 32' Samuel; 45+2' Cassano; (yellow card) 67' Aldair	Stadium: Highbury; Attendance: 35,472; Referee: Urs Meier (Germany)

19 March 2003 12	Valencia (Spain)	2–1	(England) Arsenal	Valencia, Spain
20:45 CET	Carew 34', 57'; Carboni (yellow card) 36'; Pellegrino (yellow card) 54'; Aimar (yellow card) 76'	Report	(yellow card) 42' Vieira; 49' Henry; (yellow card) 90+3' Pires	Stadium: Mestalla Stadium; Attendance: 50,000; Referee: Kyros Vassaras (Greece)

== Player statistics ==
Arsenal used a total of 30 players during the 2002–03 season and there were 17 different goalscorers. There were also two squad members who did not make a first-team appearance in the campaign. Henry featured in 55 matches, three of which he came on as a substitute.

The team scored a total of 112 goals in all competitions. The highest goalscorer was Henry, with 32 goals, followed by Pires who scored 16 goals. Four Arsenal players were sent off during the season: Vieira, Cygan, Campbell (twice) and Touré.

Key

No. = Squad number

Pos = Playing position

Nat. = Nationality

Apps = Appearances

GK = Goalkeeper

DF = Defender

MF = Midfielder

FW = Forward

= Yellow cards

= Red cards

Numbers in parentheses denote appearances as substitute. Players with number struck through and marked † left the club during the playing season.

No.	Pos.	Nat.	Name	Premier League		FA Cup		League Cup		Community Shield		Champions League		Total		Discipline	
No.	Pos.	Nat.	Name	Apps	Goals	Apps	Goals	Apps	Goals	Apps	Goals	Apps	Goals	Apps	Goals	A yellow rectangular card	A red rectangular card
1	GK	ENG	David Seaman	28	0	5	0	0	0	1	0	9	0	43	0	0	0
3	DF	ENG	Ashley Cole	30 (1)	1	3	0	0	0	1	0	9	0	43 (1)	1	7	0
4	MF	FRA	Patrick Vieira	24	3	5	0	0	0	1	0	12	0	42	4	11	1
5	DF	ENG	Martin Keown	22 (2)	0	5	0	0	0	1	0	4 (1)	0	32 (3)	0	7	0
7	MF	FRA	Robert Pires	21 (5)	14	5 (1)	1	1	1	0	0	8 (1)	0	35 (7)	16	2	0
8	MF	SWE	Freddie Ljungberg	19 (1)	6	3 (1)	1	0	0	0	0	7 (1)	2	29 (3)	9	0	0
9	FW	ENG	Francis Jeffers	2 (14)	2	6	3	1	1	0	0	1 (4)	0	10 (18)	6	1	0
10	FW	NED	Dennis Bergkamp	23 (6)	4	2 (2)	2	0	0	1	1	6 (1)	1	32 (9)	7	3	0
11	FW	FRA	Sylvain Wiltord	27 (7)	10	3 (4)	2	0	0	1	0	10 (2)	1	41 (13)	13	2	0
12	DF	CMR	Lauren	26 (1)	2	6	2	0	0	1	0	9 (1)	0	42 (2)	4	8	0
13	GK	ENG	Stuart Taylor	7 (1)	0	2	0	1	0	0	0	1 (1)	0	11 (2)	0	0	0
14	FW	FRA	Thierry Henry	37	24	2 (3)	1	0	0	1	0	12	7	52 (3)	32	10	0
15	MF	ENG	Ray Parlour	14 (5)	0	6	0	0	0	1	0	(2)	0	21 (7)	0	4	0
16	MF	NED	Giovanni van Bronckhorst	9 (11)	1	3 (2)	0	1	0	0	0	2 (2)	0	15 (15)	1	2	0
17	MF	BRA	Edu	12 (6)	2	5 (1)	1	0	0	1	0	1 (3)	0	19 (10)	3	5	0
18	DF	FRA	Pascal Cygan	16 (2)	1	2	0	0	0	0	0	9 (2)	0	27 (4)	1	4	1
19	MF	BRA	Gilberto Silva	32 (3)	0	1 (2)	0	0	0	(1)	1	11 (1)	2	44 (7)	3	1	0
20	DF	ENG	Matthew Upson	0	0	1	0	0	0	0	0	0	0	1	0	0	0
21	MF	ENG	Jermaine Pennant	1 (4)	3	0	0	1	0	0	0	0 (1)	0	2 (4)	3	0	0
22	DF	UKR	Oleh Luzhnyi	11 (6)	0	2	0	1	0	0	0	3 (1)	0	17 (7)	0	3	0
23	DF	ENG	Sol Campbell	33	2	5	1	0	0	1	0	10	0	49	3	4	2
24	GK	SWE	Rami Shaaban	3	0	0	0	0	0	0	0	2	0	5	0	0	0
25	FW	NGR	Nwankwo Kanu	10 (7)	5	1	0	1	0	0	0	2 (6)	1	14 (13)	6	0	0
26	DF	LAT	Igors Stepanovs	2	0	0	0	1	0	0	0	1	0	4	0	0	0
27	DF	GRE	Stathis Tavlaridis	0 (1)	0	0	0	1	0	0	0	0	0	1 (1)	0	0	0
28	MF	CIV	Kolo Touré	9 (17)	2	3 (2)	0	1	0	(1)	0	3 (4)	0	16 (24)	2	2	1
29	DF	GER	Moritz Volz	0	0	0	0	1	0	0	0	0	0	(1)	0	0	0
30	FW	FRA	Jérémie Aliadière	(3)	1	0	0	0	0	0	0	0	0	(3)	1	0	0
31	MF	DEN	Sebastian Svärd	0	0	1	0	1	0	0	0	0	0	2	0	0	0
35	MF	ENG	David Bentley	0	0	(1)	0	0	0	0	0	0	0	0	0	0	0
40	MF	ENG	Ryan Garry	1	0	0	0	(1)	0	0	0	0	0	1 (1)	0	0	0
42	DF	ENG	Justin Hoyte	(1)	0	0	0	0	0	0	0	0	0	0	0	0	0

== See also ==
- 2002–03 in English football
- List of Arsenal F.C. seasons
