= Clydie Roberts =

English-born Guyanese footballer

Personal information
- Date of birth: 7 July 1987 (age 39)
- Place of birth: England
- Position: Midfielder

Team information
- Current team: Brentwood Town

Youth career
- Redbridge

Senior career*
Years	Team	Apps	(Gls)
- Redbridge
- Thurrock
- Canvey Island
?–2008	Harlow Town		
2008–2009	Potters Bar Town		
2009	Waltham Forest		
2009	Enfield Town		
2009	Aveley		
2009	Concord Rangers		
2010	Grays Athletic	2	(0)
2011	Ilford	9	(0)
2011–	Brentwood Town		

International career^{‡}
2008	Guyana	2	(0)
- * Club domestic league appearances and goals as of 16:43, 26 August 2011 (UTC) ‡ National team caps and goals as of 16:43, 26 August 2011 (UTC)

Clydie Roberts (born 7 July 1987) is an English-born Guyanese footballer who plays as a midfielder for Brentwood Town, and has been capped internationally for the Guyana national football team. He has spent his entire career playing non-League football.

== Career ==
=== Club career ===
Roberts started his career with Redbridge progressing through their youth system into the first-team. He went on to have a short spell with Thurrock before moving onto Canvey Island, where he was voted 'Player's Player of the Year' for the 2006–07 season where he made 44 appearances, scoring three goals. He helped them gain promotion from Isthmian League Division One North to Isthmian League Premier Division. Roberts then had a trial with AFC Wimbledon in July 2007, but was not offered a contract by manager Terry Brown.

In July 2008, Roberts had an unsuccessful trial with League Two club Bournemouth. He joined Potters Bar Town in late 2008 from Harlow Town. He made his debut for Potters Bar Town, in the 1–0 away win over Waltham Forest in November 2008 alongside Ryan Edgar. Roberts left the club in January 2009 and signed for Waltham Forest. Later in January, he joined Waltham Forest's Isthmian League Division One North league rivals Enfield Town.

He went on to join Aveley, then Concord Rangers in December 2009, before signing for Grays Athletic in October 2010, where he made two appearances in the Isthmian League Division One North. Roberts went on to join Ilford, where he made nine league appearances. He went on to join Brentwood Town at the start of the 2011–12 season.

=== International career ===
Roberts gained two caps for Guyana in 2008. He made his debut in a home friendly against Cuba in the 0–0 draw on 22 February, and his second cap in the 2–1 win against Cuba on 24 February, alongside his Canvey Island teammate Chris Bourne.

== Personal life ==
Roberts is cousin to professional footballer and England international, Jermain Defoe.
