= Michael Wylde =

English footballer

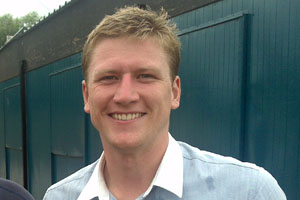

Personal information
- Full name: Michael Joseph Wylde
- Date of birth: 6 January 1987 (age 39)
- Place of birth: Birmingham, England
- Position: Defender

Senior career*
Years	Team	Apps	(Gls)
2006–2008	Cheltenham Town	8	(0)
2008	→ Kidderminster Harriers (loan)	2	(0)
2008–2011	Tamworth	73	(8)
2011–2013	Cambridge United	28	(1)
2012–2013	AFC Telford United (loan)	2	(0)
2013	Tamworth	10	(1)
2013–2014	Alfreton Town	28	(4)

International career^{‡}
2011	England C	1	(0)
- * Club domestic league appearances and goals as of 21:23, 6 January 2017 (UTC) ‡ National team caps and goals as of 22:30, 15 January 2013 (UTC)

Michael Wylde (born 6 January 1987) is an English footballer who plays as a defender. He last played for Conference Premier side Alfreton Town.

== Club career ==
=== Cheltenham Town ===
Born in Birmingham, West Midlands, Wylde signed his first professional contract with The Robins aged 19-year-old. Wylde suffered a broken jaw in a clash with Cheltenham Town teammate Shane Duff in a pre-season friendly against Hereford United on 4 August 2007.

=== Kidderminster Harriers ===
To gain first team experience, Wylde along with Plymouth Argyle player Jake Moult joined Conference National side Kidderminster Harriers in March 2008 on loan for the remainder of the season.

=== Tamworth ===
Wylde was part of the successful Tamworth squad that earned promotion to the Conference National by winning the Conference North in the 2008–09 season. He signed a new contract in May 2009 to commit to the new season in the Conference National. Following the end of a rather successful 2009/10 season, Wylde was expected to join former side Kidderminster Harriers. However this never happened and he committed his future to the Lambs for another season, penned a 12-month deal.

=== Cambridge United ===
On 31 May 2011, it was announced that Michael Wylde had joined Cambridge United on a free, signing a two-year contract with the club. He joined AFC Telford United on a one-month loan in November 2012, playing three times. Following his loan spell, Wylde's contract at Cambridge was cancelled by mutual consent in January 2013 after manager Richard Money confirmed that he would take no further part in their season.

=== Return to Tamworth ===
After his release Wylde returned to Tamworth until the end of the 2012–13 season. He left the club in June 2013 after the club decided against offering him a new contract.

=== Alfreton Town ===
Wylde joined Alfreton Town in June 2013, signing a one-year contract and made his first appearance as a substitute in a 3–1 defeat to Forest Green Rovers.

== International career ==
Along with teammate Alex Rodman, Wylde received a call up for the England C team to play against Estonia U23 on 13 October 2010.

== Career statistics ==
As of match played 4 January 2014.

Club	Season	League			FA Cup		League Cup		Other		Total	
Club	Season	Division	Apps	Goals	Apps	Goals	Apps	Goals	Apps	Goals	Apps	Goals
Cheltenham Town	2005–06	League Two	1	0	0	0	0	0	1 (Note: Appearance in the Football League Trophy)	0	2	0
Cheltenham Town	2006–07	League One	7	0	1	0	1	0	1	0	10	0
Cheltenham Town	2007–08	League One	0	0	0	0	0	0	1	0	1	0
Cheltenham Town	Total		8	0	1	0	1	0	3	0	13	0
Kidderminster Harriers (loan)	2007–08	Conference Premier	2	0	0	0	—		0	0	2	0
Tamworth	2008–09	Conference North	?	?	?	?	—		?	?	?	?
Tamworth	2009–10	Conference Premier	33	4	0	0	—		0	0	33	4
Tamworth	2010–11	Conference Premier	40	4	4	0	—		0	0	44	4
Tamworth	Total		73	8	4	0	—		0	0	77	8
Cambridge	2011–12	Conference Premier	22	1	1	1	—		1 (Note: Appearance in the FA Trophy)	0	24	2
Cambridge	2012–13	Conference Premier	6	0	0	0	—		0	0	6	0
Cambridge	Total		28	1	1	1	—		1	0	30	2
AFC Telford United (loan)	2012–13	Conference Premier	2	0	0	0	—		1	0	3	0
Tamworth	2012–13	Conference Premier	10	1	0	0	—		0	0	10	1
Alfreton Town	2013–14	Conference Premier	20	4	0	0	—		1	0	21	4
Career total			143	14	6	1	1	0	6	0	156	15
