= Aaron Ledgister =

English footballer

Personal information
- Full name: Aaron Tyrone Ledgister
- Date of birth: 19 September 1988 (age 38)
- Place of birth: Hong Kong
- Position: Midfielder

Senior career*
Years	Team	Apps	(Gls)
2006–2007	Bristol City	0	(0)
2007–2009	Cheltenham Town	5	(0)
2007–2008	→ Weston-super-Mare (loan)	6	(0)
2007	→ Bath City (loan)	4	(0)
2008	→ Chippenham Town (loan)		
2009	Worcester City		
2010–2011	Corsham Town	28	(10)
2011–2012	Weston-super-Mare		
2012–	Frome Town	53	(4)
- * Club domestic league appearances and goals

Aaron Tyrone Ledgister (born 19 September 1988) is an English footballer who plays for Frome Town. He plays in the position of a midfielder.

== Career ==
Ledgister started out as a highly rated academy player at Bristol City, and played in their youth and reserve games. He then moved to Cheltenham in July 2007 after playing in a few reserve games for them making his first team debut in the EFL Cup against Southend United, coming on as sub. During the 2007–08 season he went to both Weston-super-Mare and Bath City on loan. Aaron made an impression in a League Cup tie against Stoke City where he came off the bench to set up Alex Russell. The 2008–09 season, saw Ledgister playing at his home town club Chippenham Town on loan. He was released by Cheltenham Town in July 2009.

In July 2009, Ledgister joined Conference South side Weymouth on trial for pre-season but turned down their offer of a deal. In 2010, he joined Corsham Town.

In August 2011, Ledgister returned to Conference South outfit, Weston-super-Mare, before a move in 2012 to Southern Premier side Frome Town F.C.
