= 2002–03 FA Trophy =

Tournament details
- Country: England; Wales
- Teams: 206

Final positions
- Champions: Burscough
- Runners-up: Tamworth

Tournament statistics
- Attendance: 14,625

The 2002–03 FA Trophy is the thirty-fifth season of the FA Trophy.

== Qualifying round ==
=== Ties ===
Tie	Home team	Score	Away team
1	Alfreton Town	5–0	Guiseley
2	Arlesey Town	1–3	Burnham
3	Atherstone United	0–1	Gloucester City
4	Aveley	2–0	Newport IOW
5	Bamber Bridge	2–2	Leek Town
6	Bashley	1–2	Marlow
7	Bedworth United	0–1	Corby Town
8	Berkhamsted Town	6–0	Leatherhead
9	Bognor Regis Town	5–2	Wivenhoe Town
10	Bracknell Town	2–2	Fisher Athletic London
11	Bromsgrove Rovers	0–1	Banbury United
12	Burnham	3–1	Arlesey Town
13	Chorley	1–1	Stocksbridge Park Steels
14	Corinthian Casuals	4–3	Barking & East Ham United
15	Croydon Athletic	0–3	Tonbridge Angels
16	Dorchester Town	4–1	Yeading
17	East Thurrock United	2–0	Sittingbourne
18	Erith & Belvedere	2–0	St Leonards
19	Farsley Celtic	1–0	Ossett Town
20	Fleet Town	1–1	Epsom & Ewell
21	Harlow Town	2–2	Uxbridge
22	Hertford Town	1–0	Molesey
23	Histon	2–0	Wingate & Finchley
24	Hornchurch	2–6	Walton & Hersham
25	Horsham	4–0	Tilbury
26	King's Lynn	4–0	Chertsey Town
27	Leyton Pennant	0–2	Oxford City
28	Lincoln United	4–3	Bishop Auckland
29	Mangotsfield United	4–2	Stourport Swifts
30	Merthyr Tydfil	2–0	Evesham United
31	Metropolitan Police	1–1	Dulwich Hamlet
32	North Ferriby United	3–0	Matlock Town
33	Northwood	0–2	Tooting & Mitcham United
34	Racing Club Warwick	0–1	Clevedon Town
35	Radcliffe Borough	0–1	Eastwood Town
36	Rocester	2–2	Workington
37	Rossendale United	2–2	Witton Albion
38	Rothwell Town	4–0	Cinderford Town
39	Salisbury City	2–0	Dartford
40	Shepshed Dynamo	2–2	Taunton Town
41	Slough Town	2–0	Wembley
42	Solihull Borough	2–0	Sutton Coldfield Town
43	Spalding United	3–0	Barton Rovers
44	Trafford	2–0	Belper Town
45	Wealdstone	0–0	Banstead Athletic
46	Windsor & Eton	2–1	Ashford Town (Middlesex)

=== Replays ===
Tie	Home team	Score	Away team
5	Leek Town	3–1	Bamber Bridge
10	Fisher Athletic London	4–7	Bracknell Town
13	Stockbridge Park Steels	1–0	Chorley
20	Epsom & Ewell	2–0	Fleet Town
21	Uxbridge	1–2	Harlow Town
31	Dulwich Hamlet	3–1	Metropolitan Police
36	Workington	2–2	Rocester
	(Rocester won 4–3 on penalties)		
37	Witton Albion	2–0	Rossendale United
40	Taunton Town	3–0	Shepshed Dynamo
45	Banstead Athletic	0–1	Wealdstone

== 1st round ==
=== Ties ===
Tie	Home team	Score	Away team
1	Aveley	1–4	Weymouth
2	Banbury United	1–1	Gloucester City
3	Berkhamsted Town	2–2	Bishops Stortford
4	Blyth Spartans	5–3	North Ferriby United
5	Bognor Regis Town	2–0	Boreham Wood
6	Bracknell Town	0–2	Heybridge Swifts
7	Burnham	0–2	Aylesbury United
8	Burscough	0–0	Marine
9	Carshalton Athletic	2–1	Folkestone Invicta
10	Chippenham Town	4–1	Dorchester Town
11	Clevedon Town	2–4	Hednesford Town
12	Corby Town	0–5	Rothwell Town
13	Corinthian Casuals	1–0	Croydon
14	Droylsden	2–1	Ashton United
15	East Thurrock United	1–3	Kingstonian
16	Eastbourne Borough	4–1	Hertford Town
17	Enfield	1–2	Basingstoke Town
18	Farsley Celtic	7–2	Trafford
19	Gainsborough Trinity	3–1	Kendal Town
20	Gateshead	0–2	Hyde United
21	Grantham Town	3–2	Hinckley United
22	Great Wakering Rovers	2–2	Ford United
23	Gresley Rovers	0–0	Harrogate Town
24	Halesowen Town	4–3	Bath City
25	Harlow Town	2–0	Wealdstone
26	Hastings United	1–0	Chelmsford City
27	Hemel Hempstead Town	2–3	Histon
28	Hitchin Town	3–1	Chatham Town
29	Horsham	2–0	Ashford Town (Kent)
30	Kidsgrove Athletic	1–1	Frickley Athletic
31	King's Lynn	1–2	Stamford
32	Leek Town	4–1	Eastwood Town
33	Lewes	6–4	Slough Town
34	Lincoln United	2–3	Alfreton Town
35	Mangotsfield United	3–1	Redditch United
36	Marlow	1–1	Bedford Town
37	Oxford City	4–2	Egham Town
38	Rocester	0–2	Colwyn Bay
39	Rugby United	2–1	Hucknall Town
40	Salisbury City	2–2	Erith & Belvedere
41	Solihull Borough	7–1	Swindon Supermarine
42	Spalding United	2–1	Hampton & Richmond Borough
43	Spennymoor United	4–3	Witton Albion
44	Staines Town	1–2	Epsom & Ewell
45	Stocksbridge Park Steels	0–1	Whitby Town
46	Sutton United	2–1	Harrow Borough
47	Taunton Town	1–2	Merthyr Tydfil
48	Thame United	3–2	Bromley
49	Tonbridge Angels	3–2	Maidenhead United
50	Tooting & Mitcham United	2–3	Dulwich Hamlet
51	Weston super Mare	2–2	Cirencester Town
52	Whyteleafe	1–5	Walton & Hersham
53	Windsor & Eton	2–2	Welling United
54	Worthing	1–4	Cambridge City

=== Replays ===
Tie	Home team	Score	Away team
2	Gloucester City	2–1	Banbury United
3	Bishops Stortford	2–0	Berkhamsted Town
8	Marine	1–3	Burscough
22	Ford United	6–1	Great Wakering Rovers
23	Harrogate Town	3–0	Gresley Rovers
30	Frickley Athletic	2–1	Kidsgrove Athletic
36	Bedford Town	1–2	Marlow
40	Erith & Belvedere	2–0	Salisbury City
51	Cirencester Town	3–2	Weston super Mare
53	Welling United	3–5	Windsor & Eton

== 2nd round ==
=== Ties ===
Tie	Home team	Score	Away team
1	Barrow	4–2	Whitby Town
2	Basingstoke Town	0–2	Sutton United
3	Bishop's Stortford	2–2	Marlow
4	Bognor Regis Town	1–4	Hendon
5	Bradford Park Avenue	0–1	Altrincham
6	Cambridge City	0–1	Crawley Town
7	Canvey Island	2–0	Carshalton Athletic
8	Chesham United	0–0	Walton & Hersham
9	Chippenham Town	0–1	Aylesbury United
10	Corinthian Casuals	0–4	Cirencester Town
11	Dover Athletic	2–0	Ford United
12	Droylsden	1–2	Colwyn Bay
13	Gloucester City	0–0	Merthyr Tydfil
14	Grantham Town	0–1	Gainsborough Trinity
15	Grays Athletic	3–1	Tiverton Town
16	Harlow Town	0–3	Lewes
17	Harrogate Town	2–2	Burscough
18	Hastings United	0–2	Eastbourne Borough
19	Havant & Waterlooville	1–1	Billericay Town
20	Heybridge Swifts	2–1	Weymouth
21	Histon	3–4	Farsley Celtic
22	Horsham	1–2	Thame United
23	Ilkeston Town	3–1	Hednesford Town
24	Kingstonian	5–1	Erith & Belvedere
25	Lancaster City	6–1	Stamford
26	Leek Town	3–1	Hyde United
27	Mangotsfield United	0–1	Dulwich Hamlet
28	Moor Green	2–3	Blyth Spartans
29	Newport County	2–1	Epsom & Ewell
30	Oxford City	1–0	Braintree Town
31	Purfleet	3–2	Tonbridge Angels
32	Runcorn FC Halton	0–3	Rugby United
33	Spennymoor United	1–1	Halesowen Town
34	St Albans City	0–1	Hayes
35	Stafford Rangers	0–2	Alfreton Town
36	Stalybridge Celtic	2–0	Rothwell Town
37	Tamworth	4–1	Accrington Stanley
38	Vauxhall Motors	4–2	Frickley Athletic
39	Wakefield & Emley	5–0	Spalding United
40	Windsor & Eton	3–1	Hitchin Town
41	Worcester City	1–0	Aldershot Town
42	Worksop Town	4–2	Solihull Borough

=== Replays ===
Tie	Home team	Score	Away team
3	Marlow	2–3	Bishops Stortford
8	Walton & Hersham	0–1	Chesham United
13	Merthyr Tydfil	0–1	Gloucester City
17	Burscough	3–2	Harrogate Town
19	Billericay Town	1–2	Havant & Waterlooville
33	Halesowen Town	4–1	Spennymoor United

== 3rd round ==
The teams from Football Conference entered in this round.

=== Ties ===
Tie	Home team	Score	Away team
1	Alfreton Town	2–1	Halesowen Town
2	Aylesbury United	1–0	Kingstonian
3	Canvey Island	5–1	Cirencester Town
4	Chester City	1–2	Worksop Town
5	Colwyn Bay	1–0	Blyth Spartans
6	Dagenham & Redbridge	5–2	Bishop's Stortford
7	Dover Athletic	1–0	Gravesend & Northfleet
8	Dulwich Hamlet	0–2	Margate
9	Eastbourne Borough	0–1	Farnborough Town
10	Farsley Celtic	1–1	Gainsborough Trinity
11	Forest Green Rovers	4–2	Barnet
12	Gloucester City	3–2	Lewes
13	Halifax Town	4–1	Doncaster Rovers
14	Hayes	2–1	Crawley Town
15	Hereford United	1–2	Yeovil Town
16	Heybridge Swifts	0–0	Hendon
17	Ilkeston Town	0–3	Burscough
18	Kettering Town	1–1	Altrincham
19	Lancaster City	0–1	Morecambe
20	Leek Town	1–2	Southport
21	Leigh RMI	1–2	Vauxhall Motors
22	Northwich Victoria	3–1	Barrow
23	Purfleet	1–2	Grays Athletic
24	Rugby United	0–2	Telford United
25	Stalybridge Celtic	0–3	Scarborough
26	Stevenage Borough	2–1	Oxford City
27	Sutton United	1–3	Havant & Waterlooville
28	Tamworth	3–0	Nuneaton Borough
29	Wakefield & Emley	1–0	Burton Albion
30	Windsor & Eton	3–2	Thame United
31	Woking	3–0	Chesham United
32	Worcester City	3–2	Newport County

=== Replays ===
Tie	Home team	Score	Away team
10	Gainsborough Trinity	2–1	Farsley Celtic
16	Hendon	2–1	Heybridge Swifts
18	Altrincham	3–3	Kettering Town
	(Altrincham won 5–3 on penalties)		

== 4th round ==
=== Ties ===
Tie	Home team	Score	Away team
1	Alfreton Town	1–1	Burscough
2	Altrincham	0–1	Aylesbury United
3	Colwyn Bay	0–2	Havant & Waterlooville
4	Dagenham & Redbridge	0–0	Southport
5	Gainsborough Trinity	0–2	Forest Green Rovers
6	Gloucester City	0–0	Woking
7	Halifax Town	3–2	Grays Athletic
8	Northwich Victoria	2–1	Canvey Island
9	Scarborough	1–1	Dover Athletic
10	Tamworth	3–0	Stevenage Borough
11	Telford United	2–3	Farnborough Town
12	Wakefield & Emley	0–0	Hendon
13	Windsor & Eton	1–1	Vauxhall Motors
14	Worcester City	0–2	Margate
15	Worksop Town	2–3	Hayes
16	Yeovil Town	2–1	Morecambe

=== Replays ===
Tie	Home team	Score	Away team
1	Burscough	2–0	Alfreton Town
4	Southport	2–2	Dagenham & Redbridge
6	Woking	0–2	Gloucester City
9	Dover Athletic	2–1	Scarborough
12	Hendon	0–1	Wakefield & Emley
13	Vauxhall Motors	0–3	Windsor & Eton

== 5th round ==
=== Ties ===
Tie	Home team	Score	Away team	Attendance
1	Aylesbury United	2–2	Windsor & Eton	847
2	Burscough	5–0	Wakefield & Emley	437
3	Dover Athletic	0–3	Forest Green Rovers	932
4	Farnborough Town	2–0	Halifax Town	863
5	Gloucester City	1–1	Southport	1,237
6	Havant & Waterlooville	3–0	Hayes	456
7	Margate	0–2	Tamworth	971
8	Yeovil Town	2–1	Northwich Victoria	4,469

=== Replays ===
Tie	Home team	Score	Away team
1	Windsor & Eton	1–1	Aylesbury United
	(Aylesbury United won 5–4 on penalties)		
5	Southport	1–3	Gloucester City

== Quarter finals ==
Tie	Home team	Score	Away team	Attendance
1	Aylesbury United	2–1	Gloucester City	1,435
2	Farnborough Town	1–2	Tamworth	1,312
3	Forest Green Rovers	1–2	Havant & Waterlooville	1,016
4	Yeovil Town	0–2	Burscough	4,934

== Semi-finals ==
=== First leg ===
5 April 2003

Aylesbury United	1–1	Burscough
Maskell 62'		Martindale 69'

Buckingham Road, Aylesbury
Attendance: 1,524

5 April 2003

Tamworth	1–0	Havant & Waterlooville
Rickards 43'

The Lamb Ground, Tamworth
Attendance: 2,165

=== Second leg ===
12 April 2003
1500 (GMT)

Burscough	1–0	Aylesbury United
Teale 90' (pen.)

Victoria Park, Burscough
Attendance: 1,773

Burscough win 2–1 on aggregate

12 April 2003

Havant & Waterlooville	1–1	Tamworth
Taylor 42'		Rickards 111'

West Leigh Park, Havant
Attendance: 1,331

Tamworth win 2–1 on aggregate after extra time

== Final ==
The final was played at Villa Park, Birmingham, on Sunday 18 May 2003.

18 May 2003
16:05 BST

Burscough	2–1	Tamworth
Martindale 26', 55'	Report	Cooper 79'

Villa Park, Birmingham
Attendance: 14,296
Referee: Uriah Rennie (South Yorkshire)
