= Sosthene Yao =

Ivorian footballer (born 1987)

Sos Yao
Personal information
- Full name: Sosthene Aubin Yao
- Date of birth: 7 August 1987 (age 39)
- Place of birth: Bloléquin, Ivory Coast
- Height: 5 ft 4 in (1.63 m)
- Position: Striker

Youth career
- 2003–2005: West Ham United

Senior career*
Years	Team	Apps	(Gls)
2005–2008	Cheltenham Town	70	(0)
2007–2008	→ Weston-super-Mare (loan)	7	(0)
2008	Bishop's Stortford	12	(10)
2008	Fisher Athletic	6	(1)
2009	Wingate & Finchley	2	(0)
2009	AFC Hornchurch		
2009	Boreham Wood		
2009–2010	Billericay Town		
2010	AFC Hornchurch		
2010	Harlow Town		
2010	AFC Hornchurch		
2010	Brentwood Town		
2011–2012	Maldon & Tiptree		
2012	Witham Town		
2012–2013	Tooting & Mitcham United		
2013	Aveley	6	(2)
2013	Brentwood Town		(2)
2015	Maldon & Tiptree	5	(1)
2025	Regent's Park Rangers	1	(1)
- * Club domestic league appearances and goals as of 03:42, 16 August 2018 (UTC)

Sosthene Aubin Yao (born 7 August 1987), known as Sos Yao, is an Ivorian former footballer who played as a striker.

== Career ==
Born in Bloléquin, Ivory Coast, Yao moved to England as a child and showed enough promise as a young footballer to be taken on at the West Ham United Academy. He spent two years as a scholarship player at the club appearing regularly in the Academy Youth League before he was released at the end of the 2004–05 season.

He played on trial at Barnsley in February and March 2005, Bristol City in March 2005 and two games on trial for Yeovil Town at the end of 2004–05 season. He also played number of reserve games on trial for Cheltenham Town, performing well enough to be offered a contract to finish the third year of his scholarship with the club.

He made his Cheltenham Town debut as a substitute during the Football League Two match at home to Carlisle United on 17 September 2005, and in doing so he became the youngest player to play for Cheltenham Town in the Football League at the time, aged 18 years and 40 days old. He signed an extended contract with the club in April 2006, adding two years to his current contract.

On 20 December 2007, Yao joined Conference South club Weston-super-Mare on a one-month loan.

He left the club in February 2008 by mutual consent. and in March joined Bishop's Stortford. He made his debut for the club on 4 March 2008 as a late substitute in a Conference South match against Welling United. In September, he moved to Fisher Athletic, and scored the winner on his debut against Basingstoke Town,

He started the 2009–10 season playing for A.F.C. Hornchurch before heading off to Boreham Wood, where he scored three goals in his first two matches, including a goal on his debut against Ashford Town in a Ryman Football League Premier division match. He was released in late October 2009. He rejoined Hornchurch in January 2010, before signing for Harlow Town in June 2010, before being released and signing for AFC Hornchurch for a third time in October 2010. He then signed for Brentwood Town on 31 December 2010.

In October 2012, Yao transferred from Witham Town to Tooting & Mitcham United.

On 18 June 2013, Yao signed for Aveley. Yao only stayed at Aveley for the first six league games of the season, scoring twice, before re-signing for Brentwood. Yao's only goals for the club in his second spell came in a 4–1 win against Wroxham on 30 November 2013.

On 26 March 2015, Yao rejoined Maldon & Tiptree.
