= Ryan Edgar =

Footballer (born 1986)

Personal information
- Date of birth: 10 August 1986 (age 40)
- Place of birth: Newham, England
- Position: Midfielder

Youth career
- 20xx–2006: Milton Keynes Dons

Senior career*
Years	Team	Apps	(Gls)
2006–2007	Farnborough Town		
2007–2008	Canvey Island		
2008	Histon		
2008	Potters Bar Town		
2008–2009	Enfield Town	22	(0)
2009	Canvey Island		
2009–2010	Aveley		
2010–2012	Brentwood Town		
2012	Canvey Island		

International career
2008	Dominica	2	(0)
- * Club domestic league appearances and goals

Ryan Edgar (born 10 August 1986) is a former footballer who played as a midfielder. Born in England, he represented Dominica at international level.

== Early and personal life ==
Edgar was born in Newham.

Edgar is a cousin of England international footballer Jermain Defoe. In May 2009, Edgar was fined for driving Defoe's car without a full driving license.

== Club career ==
Edgar was with Milton Keynes Dons and Farnborough Town before joining Canvey Island. In July 2008 he had a trial with Luton Town, but joined Histon at the start of the 2008–09 season. He moved on to Potters Bar Town where he left to join Enfield Town in December 2008.

He subsequently rejoined Canvey Island, from where he joined Aveley in September 2009.

== International career ==
Edgar made his debut for the Dominican national side in February 2008, playing in the 1–1 draw against Barbados in the first match of CONCACAF qualification for the 2010 World Cup. He also played in the return tie the following month, which Barbados won 1–0. The two games remain Edgar's only international appearances to date.
