= Rocky Baptiste =

English footballer

Personal information
- Full name: Rocky Baptiste
- Date of birth: 8 July 1972 (age 54)
- Place of birth: Clapham, London, England
- Height: 6 ft 2 in (1.88 m)
- Position: Forward

Youth career
- Chelsea
- Brentford
- Wealdstone

Senior career*
Years	Team	Apps	(Gls)
2000	Hayes	14	(6)
2000–2001	Luton Town	3	(0)
2001	→ Hayes (loan)	7	(5)
2001–2003	Farnborough Town	59	(30)
2003–2004	Stevenage Borough	20	(4)
2004–2005	Margate	54	(17)
2005	Gravesend & Northfleet	0	(0)
2005–2008	Havant & Waterlooville	158	(86)
2008–2009	Maidenhead United	21	(3)
2009	AFC Wimbledon	1	(1)
2009–2011	Harrow Borough	76	(50)
2011	Thurrock	3	(0)
2011	Kingstonian	2	(0)
2011	Thurrock	4	(0)
2012–2013	Wingate & Finchley	4	(1)
2013–2014	Eastbourne Town	7	(2)
Total		433	(205)
- * Club domestic league appearances and goals

Rocky Baptiste (born 8 July 1972) is an English retired football striker.

== Career ==
Born in Clapham, London, he went to secondary school at Neasden High School. Baptiste was a junior at Chelsea and Brentford, but failed to earn a professional contract.

=== Hayes to Luton ===
After initially playing for Wealdstone, Baptiste made his breakthrough with Hayes in 2000, where he scored six goals in 14 league games and caught the eye of Luton Town. At a struggling Luton, he made three league substitute appearances without scoring. When Joe Kinnear became manager, Baptiste fell out of favour and made a return to Hayes on loan for the rest of the season.

=== Farnborough ===
During the close season, Baptiste signed for Farnborough Town, where he stayed for two years scoring a total of 30 goals in 49 appearances, including Farnborough's lone strike in the FA Cup fourth round defeat to Arsenal.

=== Stevenage and Margate ===
In the summer of 2003, Baptiste joined Stevenage Borough, following manager Graham Westley's move, where he stayed until February 2004 scoring four league goals. Baptiste moved on to Margate, scoring five goals.

=== Gravesend & Northfleet and Havant & Waterlooville ===
After a short spell with Gravesend & Northfleet, Baptiste moved to Havant & Waterlooville in August 2005. Baptiste scored the equaliser at the Liberty Stadium that forced a replay with Swansea City in the third round of the 2008 FA Cup. He also went on to score in the shock 4–2 replay victory that helped them into the fourth round against Liverpool.

In September 2008, he left Havant & Waterlooville to play for Maidenhead United, spending the first half of the season there before signing for AFC Wimbledon on 31 March 2009.

=== Harrow Borough ===
He joined Harrow Borough in the summer of 2009. While playing for Harrow, Baptiste infamously missed an open goal after taking the ball past the opposition defence and goalkeeper. He was inside the six-yard box and just a few inches from the goal line when he smashed the ball on to the left-hand post. At the end of both the 2009–10 and 2010–11 seasons he finished as top scorer for Borough, scoring 22 league goals in each season. In 2010–11, he led Boro to the playoffs where he scored twice but Boro lost in extra time. He scored a total of 28 goals for Borough in the 2010–11 season.

He left Harrow Borough in the summer of 2011 joining Thurrock of the Conference South. However, before the end of August he was back in the Isthmian League with Kingstonian.

=== Wingate & Finchley ===
Baptiste scored on his debut for Isthmian League team Wingate & Finchley from the substitute bench on 20 October 2012 against Lewes in a 3–1 defeat. In October 2013 he moved on to Eastbourne Town.

=== Eastbourne Town ===
Rocky played eight games for Eastbourne Town seven in the Isthmian League scoring two goals and one appearance in the FA Trophy.
