= 2006–07 Peterborough United F.C. season =

Peterborough United
2006–07 season
- Chairman: Barry Fry; Darragh MacAnthony
- Manager: Keith Alexander; Tommy Taylor; Darren Ferguson
- Stadium: London Road Stadium
- League Two: 10th
- FA Cup: Third round
- League Cup: Second round
- Football League Trophy: Southern quarter-final
- Top goalscorer: League: Aaron McLean 7 All: Aaron McLean 10
- Highest home attendance: 10,756 – vs. Everton, 19 September 2006
- Lowest home attendance: 1,432 – vs. Swansea City, 29 November 2006

During the 2006–07 season Peterborough United played in Football League Two, the fourth tier of the English football pyramid. They had finished the previous season of Football League Two in 9th position.

Keith Alexander started the season as manager but was sacked in January 2007 after a run of poor form. Darren Ferguson was appointed as player-manager for the club, but by the end of the season the club only managed to finish in 10th place.

Peterborough managed to achieve a run in the FA Cup following victories over Rotherham United in the first round and Tranmere Rovers in the second round. They were eliminated in the third round by Plymouth Argyle after a defeat in a replay in Home Park.

In the League Cup Peterborough defeated Ipswich Town on penalties in the first round before losing narrowly 2–1 to Everton in the second round.

== Kit Profile ==
Supplier: Tempest Sports
Sponsor(s): MRI Overseas Property

Home	Away

== First-team squad ==
No.	Pos.	Nat.	Name	League		Cup		Total		Date signed	Previous club
No.	Pos.	Nat.	Name	Apps	Goals	Apps	Goals	Apps	Goals	Date signed	Previous club
Goalkeepers
1	GK	ENG	Mark Tyler	41	–	8	–	49	–	7 December 1994	Youth Team
31	GK	IRQ	Shwan Jalal	1	–	0	–	1	–	8 January 2007	Woking
?	GK	ENG	Luke McShane	0	–	0	–	0	–	1 July 2002	Youth Team
?	GK	ENG	Paul Rachubka	4	–	0	–	4	–	–	Huddersfield
Defenders
2	DF	ENG	Dean Holden	20 (1)	1	6	–	26 (1)	1	29 June 2005	Oldham Athletic
3	DF	ENG	Jude Stirling	14 (8)	–	3 (3)	–	17 (11)	–	1 August 2006	Lincoln City
4	DF	ENG	Mark Arber	31 (3)	–	8	–	39 (3)	–	21 December 2005	Oldham Athletic
5	DF	ENG	Guy Branston	23 (1)	–	4 (2)	1	27 (3)	1	24 July 2006	Oldham Athletic
6	DF	ENG	Chris Plummer	7	–	1	–	8	–	3 September 2004	Barnet
23	DF	ENG	Ben Futcher	22 (3)	3	5	–	27 (3)	3	24 August 2006	Grimsby Town
27	DF	ENG	Adam Smith	5 (4)	–	0 (1)	–	5 (5)	–	20 November 2006	King's Lynn
28	DF	WAL	Craig Morgan	22 (1)	1	2 (1)	–	24 (2)	1	23 November 2006	Milton Keynes Dons
33	DF	ENG	Danny Blanchett	0 (3)	1	0	–	0 (3)	1	19 March 2007	Cambridge City
Midfielders
7	MF	SKN	Adam Newton	43	1	7	–	50	1	1 May 2002	West Ham United
8	MF	ENG	Richard Butcher	35 (8)	4	8	1	43 (8)	5	26 June 2006	Lincoln City
11	MF	IRL	Peter Gain	26 (8)	6	2 (3)	–	28 (11)	6	20 June 2005	Lincoln City
17	MF	ENG	Jamie Day	17 (7)	1	5	–	22 (7)	1	1 July 2003	Youth Team
18	MF	ENG	Shane Huke	9 (9)	1	4 (1)	–	13 (10)	1	1 July 2004	Youth Team
21	MF	SCO	Darren Ferguson	0	–	0	–	0	–	20 January 2007	Wrexham
22	MF	ENG	Jimmy Ghaichem	1 (1)	–	1	–	2 (1)	–	1 September 2006	Mansfield Town
29	MF	SCO	Gavin Strachan	13 (3)	3	2	–	15 (3)	3	29 January 2007	Hartlepool United
30	MF	SCO	George Boyd	19 (1)	6	0	–	19 (1)	6	8 January 2007	Stevenage Borough
Forwards
9	ST	ENG	Justin Richards	4 (9)	1	2 (1)	–	6 (1)	1	1 June 2006	Woking
10	ST	JAM	Trevor Benjamin	15 (12)	7	3 (3)	2	18 (15)	9	8 July 2005	Coventry City
12	ST	SCO	Craig Mackail-Smith	13 (2)	8	0	–	13 (2)	8	29 January 2007	Dagenham & Redbridge
14	ST	ENG	Aaron McLean	16	7	5	3	21	10	1 January 2007	Grays Athletic
15	ST	ENG	Lloyd Opara	6 (5)	1	0 (3)	–	6 (8)	1	23 March 2006	Cheshunt
16	ST	ENG	Danny Crow	22 (13)	6	6 (1)	4	28 (14)	10	8 July 2005	Norwich City
20	ST	ENG	Simon Yeo	8 (5)	2	1 (2)	–	9 (7)	2	1 August 2006	Lincoln City

== Friendly matches ==
Date	Opponent	Venue	Result	Attendance	Scorers

== Competitions ==
=== League Two ===
==== League table ====
Pos	Team	Pld	W	D	L	GF	GA	GD	Pts
8	Stockport County	46	21	8	17	65	54	+11	71
9	Rochdale	46	18	12	16	70	50	+20	66
10	Peterborough United	46	18	11	17	70	61	+9	65
11	Darlington	46	17	14	15	52	56	−4	65
12	Wycombe Wanderers	46	16	14	16	52	47	+5	62

Rules for classification: In the Football League goals scored (GF) takes precedence over goal difference (GD).

==== Matches ====
Date	Opponent	Venue	Result	Scorers	Attendance	Position
5 August	Bristol Rovers	Home	4–1	Day, Butcher, Yeo, Opara	4,890	2nd
9 August	Boston United	Away	1–0	Yeo	3,528	3rd
12 August	Wrexham	Away	0–0	-	4,706	3rd
19 August	Macclesfield Town	Home	3–1	Benjamin (2), Teague (o.g.)	4,136	2nd
26 August	Notts County	Away	0–0	-	6,353	4th
3 September	Bury	Home	0–1	-	5,561	7th
9 September	Darlington	Home	1–3	Danny Crow	3,848	9th
12 September	Walsall	Away	0–5	-	4,070	11th
16 September	Swindon Town	Away	1–0	Benjamin	7,329	11th
23 September	Hartlepool United	Home	3–5	Butcher, Gain, Holden	3,916	11th
26 September	Barnet	Home	1–1	Gain	3,193	12th
30 September	Stockport County	Away	1–0	Benjamin	4,775	8th
6 October	Milton Keynes Dons	Away	2–0	Arber, Richards	6,647	7th
14 October	Shrewsbury Town	Home	2–1	Benjamin, Crow	4,171	7th
21 October	Wycombe Wanderers	Away	0–2	-	4,924	7th
28 October	Grimsby Town	Home	2–2	Futcher, Benjamin	4,203	7th
4 November	Accrington Stanley	Home	4–2	Benjamin, Crow (2), McLean	3,990	7th
18 November	Mansfield Town	Away	2–0	McLean, Crow	3,550	7th
25 November	Torquay United	Home	5–2	Huke, Thorpe (o.g.), Futcher, McLean, Butcher	4,452	5th
5 December	Hereford United	Away	0–0	-	2,309	6th
9 December	Rochdale	Away	1–0	McLean	1,982	6th
16 December	Chester City	Home	0–2		4,491	6th
23 December	Lincoln City	Home	1–2	Gain	8,405	7th
26 December	Barnet	Away	0–1		2,958	7th
30 December	Hartlepool United	Away	0–1		4,654	7th
1 January	Walsall	Home	0–2		4,405	7th
13 January	Darlington	Away	1–3	Smith	2,321	10th
20 January	Stockport County	Home	0–3		4,330	13th
27 January	Lincoln City	Away	0–1		6,606	14th
30 January	Swindon Town	Home	1–1	Gain	3,516	7th
3 February	Bristol Rovers	Away	2–3	Crow, McLean	5,700	16th
10 February	Wrexham	Home	3–0	McLean, Boyd, Evans (o.g.)	3,839	13th
17 February	Macclesfield Town	Away	1–2	McLean	2,274	14th
20 February	Boston United	Home	1–1	Boyd	4,882	14th
24 February	Bury	Away	3–0	Mackail-Smith, Futcher, Strachan	2,085	14th
3 March	Notts County	Home	2–0	Boyd, Morgan	5,014	11th
10 March	Milton Keynes Dons	Home	4–0	Gain, Strachan, Mackail-Smith, Butcher	5,880	10th
16 March	Shrewsbury Town	Away	1–2	Gain	4,027	11th
24 March	Grimsby Town	Away	2–0	Boyd, White	5,164	10th
31 March	Wycombe Wanderers	Home	3–3	Mackail-Smith (2), Newton	6,062	11th
7 April	Accrington Stanley	Away	2–3	Mackail-Smith, Low	1,808	13th
9 April	Mansfield Town	Home	2–0	Mackail-Smith, White	4,276	11th
14 April	Torquay United	Away	1–1	Mackail-Smith	2,106	10th
21 April	Hereford United	Home	3–0	Mackail-Smith, White, Strachan	3,759	9th
28 April	Chester City	Away	1–1	Artell (o.g.)	1,905	11th
5 May	Rochdale	Home	3–3	Boyd (2), Blanchett	6,011	10th

=== FA Cup ===
Date	Round	Opponent	Venue	Result	Scorers	Attendance	Referee
11 November	Round 1	Rotherham United	Home	3–0	Butcher, McLean, Crow	4,281	Patrick Miller
2 December	Round 2	Tranmere Rovers	Away	2–1	Crow (2)	6,308	Trevor Kettle
6 January	Round 3	Plymouth Argyle	Home	1–1	McLean	6,255	Carl Boyeson
16 January	Round 3 Replay	Plymouth Argyle	Away	1–2	McLean	9,973	Ian Williamson

=== Football League Cup ===
Date	Round	Opponent	Venue	Result	Scorers	Attendance	Referee
22 August	Round 1	Ipswich Town	Home	2–2 (4–2 p)	Benjamin, Branston	4,792	Keith Hill
19 September	Round 2	Everton	Home	1–2	Benjamin	10,756	Ian Williamson

=== Football League Trophy ===
Date	Round	Opponent	Venue	Result	Attendance	Scorers	Referee
31 October	Round 1	Swansea City	Home	1–0	1,432	Crow	Jonathan Moss
29 November	Round 2	Bristol Rovers	Away	0–1	3,621	-	Paul Taylor

== Statistics ==
=== Goal scorers ===
Pos	Player	League	Cup	Total
1	(England) Aaron McLean	7	3	10
2	(England) Danny Crow	6	4	10
3	(Jamaica) Trevor Benjamin	7	2	9
4	(Scotland) Craig Mackail-Smith	8	0	8
5	(Republic of Ireland) Peter Gain	6	0	6
6	(Scotland) George Boyd	6	0	6
7	(England) Richard Butcher	4	1	5
8	(Scotland) Gavin Strachan	3	0	3

=== Cards ===
Pos	Player	Sent off (straight red)	Booked
1	(England) Guy Branston	1	7
2	(England) Ben Futcher	0	8
3	(Saint Kitts and Nevis) Adam Newton	0	8
4	(Republic of Ireland) Peter Gain	0	5
5	(England) Mark Arber	0	5
6	(England) Aaron McLean	0	4
7	(England) Shane Huke	0	4
8	(Jamaica) Trevor Benjamin	0	3

== See also ==
- 2006–07 Football League
