= 2007–08 Peterborough United F.C. season =

Peterborough United
2007–08 season
- Chairman: Darragh MacAnthony
- Manager: Darren Ferguson
- Stadium: London Road Stadium
- League Two: 2nd (promoted)
- FA Cup: Fourth round
- Football League Cup: Second round
- Football League Trophy: Second round
- Top goalscorer: League: Aaron McLean (29); All: Aaron McLean (33)
- Highest home attendance: 12,701 (28 March vs. West Brom)
- Lowest home attendance: 4,087 (6 September vs. Southampton)
Home colours	Away colours

During the 2007–08 season Peterborough United finished as runners-up in Football League Two.

== Sponsors ==
Area	Sponsor	Type
Football League	Football League	Domestic League
Fitness	Muscle Finesse	Fitness
Photography	FC Pix	Photography
Stand Sponsor	Norwich and Peterborough	Building Society
Club Partner	Thomas Cook	Charter airline

== Squad ==
=== Goalkeepers ===
No.		Player	Pos	Lge Apps	Lge Gls	Cup Apps	Cup Gls	Tot Apps	Tot Gls	Date Signed	Previous club
1	(England)	Mark Tyler	GK	17	-	4	-	21	-	7 December 1994	Norwich
13	(Iraq)	Shwan Jalal	GK	7	-	3	-	10	-	8 January 2007	Woking
31	(England)	James McKeown	GK	0 (1)	-	0	-	0 (1)	-	20 July 2007	Walsall
32	(England)	Joe Lewis	GK	22	-	1	-	23	-	8 January 2008	Norwich

=== Defenders ===
No.		Player	Pos	Lge Apps	Lge Gls	Cup Apps	Cup Gls	Tot Apps	Tot Gls	Date Signed	Previous club
3	(England)	Shane Blackett	DF	9 (2)	-	3	-	12 (2)	-	29 January 2007	Dagenham & Redbridge
4	(Wales)	Craig Morgan	DF	41	2	5	-	46	2	23 November 2006	Milton Keynes Dons
5	(England)	Chris Westwood	DF	35 (2)	-	5(1)	-	40 (3)	-	14 May 2007	Walsall
6	(England)	Charlie Lee	DF	32 (10)	6	5 (3)	2	37 (13)	8	23 May 2007	Tottenham Hotspur
14	(England)	Scott Mitchell	DF	1 (4)	-	0 (1)	-	1 (5)	-	1 January 2008	Livingston
19	(England)	Adam Smith	DF	0	-	0	-	0	-	20 November 2006	King's Lynn
22	(England)	Kieran Charnock	DF	10	-	4	-	14	-	5 July 2007	Northwich Victoria
25	(Northern Ireland)	Jeff Hughes	DF	2 (5)	1	1 (1)	-	3 (6)	1	-	Crystal Palace
27	(France)	Claude Gnakpa	DF	25 (3)	-	3 (1)	-	28 (4)	-	17 July 2007	Swindon Town
28	(England)	Guy Branston	DF	1 (1)	-	0	-	1 (1)	-	24 July 2006	Oldham
29	(Cyprus)	Tom Williams	DF	3 (4)	-	0 (0)	-	3 (4)	-	1 July 2008	Wycombe
33	(England)	Danny Blanchett	DF	1	-	1	-	2	-	19 March 2007	Cambridge City

=== Midfielders ===
No.		Player	Pos	Lge Apps	Lge Gls	Cup Apps	Cup Gls	Tot Apps	Tot Gls	Date Signed	Previous club
2	(Wales)	Josh Low	MF	9 (6)	2	3 (2)	-	12 (8)	2	4 January 2007	Leicester City
7	(Saint Kitts and Nevis)	Adam Newton	MF	26 (6)	-	5	-	31 (6)	-	1 May 2002	West Ham United
8	(Jamaica)	Micah Hyde (c)	MF	33 (4)	-	6	-	39 (4)	-	11 January 2007	Burnley
10	(Scotland)	George Boyd	MF	41 (5)	12	7	3	48 (5)	15	8 January 2007	Stevenage Borough
11	(England)	Dean Keates	MF	33 (7)	5	3 (2)	-	36 (9)	5	14 May 2007	Walsall
15	(Republic of Ireland)	Peter Gain	MF	0	-	0	-	0	-	20 June 2005	Lincoln City
17	(England)	Jamie Day	MF	42	3	6 (1)	-	48 (1)	3	1 July 2003	Youth Team
18	(England)	Chris Whelpdale	MF	29 (6)	3	7	-	36 (6)	3	15 May 2007	Billericay Town
20	(England)	Alfie Potter	MF	0 (2)	-	0 (1)	-	0 (3)	-	1 June 2007	Youth Team
21	(Scotland)	Darren Ferguson	MF	0	-	0	-	0	-	20 January 2007	Wrexham
24	(England)	Billy Crook	MF	0	-	0	-	0	-	20 June 2007	Youth Team
29	(Scotland)	Gavin Strachan	MF	0 (3)	-	2 (1)	-	2 (4)	-	29 January 2007	Hartlepool United

=== Forwards ===
No.		Player	Pos	Lge Apps	Lge Gls	Cup Apps	Cup Gls	Tot Apps	Tot Gls	Date Signed	Previous club
9	(England)	Aaron McLean	ST	45	29	8	4	53	33	1 January 2007	Grays Athletic
12	(Scotland)	Craig Mackail-Smith	ST	34 (2)	12	4 (1)	7	38 (3)	19	29 January 2007	Dagenham & Redbridge
15	(England)	Scott Rendell	ST	3 (7)	3	0	-	3 (7)	3	22 May 2008	Cambridge United
16	(England)	Danny Crow	ST	2(2)	2	1(1)	-	3 (3)	2	8 July 2005	Northampton Town
23	(England)	Rene Howe	ST	2 (13)	1	1 (2)	-	3 (15)	1	2 July 2007	Kettering Town
26	(England)	Liam Hatch	ST	1 (10)	2	0	0	1 (10)	2	1 January 2008	Barnet

== Transfers ==
A transfer between 1 June 2007 & 31 May 2008

=== In ===
Date	Position	Nationality	Name	From	Fee	Ref.
1 June 2007	MF	(England)	Alfie Potter	Youth Team	n/a	
2 July 2007	FW	(England)	Rene Howe	Kettering Town	Undisclosed	
5 July 2007	DF	(England)	Kieran Charnock	Northwich Victoria	Undisclosed	
17 July 2007	DF	(France)	Claude Gnakpa	Swindon Town	Free	
20 July 2007	GK	(England)	James McKeown	Walsall	Free	
22 November 2007	DF	(Northern Ireland)	Jeff Hughes	Crystal Palace	Loan	
1 January 2008	FW	(England)	Liam Hatch	Barnet	£150,000	
1 January 2008	DF	(England)	Scott Mitchell	Livingston	Undisclosed	
31 December 2007	DF	(Cyprus)	Tom Williams	Wycombe Wanderers	Loan	
8 January 2008	GK	(England)	Joe Lewis	Norwich City	£400,000	
18 February 2008	ST	(England)	Scott Rendell	Cambridge United	Loan	
22 May 2008	ST	(England)	Scott Rendell	Cambridge United	£115,000	

=== Out ===
Date	Position	Nationality	Name	To	Fee	Ref.
6 June 2007	FW	(England)	Justin Richards	Kidderminster Harriers	£0	
28 June 2007	DF	(England)	Ben Futcher	Bury	£0	
28 June 2007	DF	(England)	Mark Arber	Stevenage Borough	£0	
16 July 2007	MF	(England)	Richard Butcher	Notts County	£0	
1 August 2007	DF	(England)	Jude Stirling	Milton Keynes Dons	£0	
1 August 2007	FW	(England)	Trevor Benjamin	Hereford United	£0	
20 September 2007	MF	(England)	Alfie Potter	Havant & Waterlooville	Loan	
1 January 2008	DF	(England)	Guy Branston	Notts County	£0	
10 January 2008	MF	(Scotland)	Gavin Strachan	Notts County	£0	
11 January 2008	FW	(England)	Rene Howe	Rochdale	Loan	
11 January 2008	GK	(Iraq)	Shwan Jalal	Morecambe	Loan	
17 January 2008	MF	(England)	Peter Gain	Dagenham & Redbridge	£0	

== Fixtures and results ==
=== Friendlies ===
Date	Opponent	Venue	Result	Attendance	Scorers
10 July	Stamford	Away	1–0	712	Ginty
13 July	Celtic	Home	1–2	5,800	McLean
18 July	Hucknall Town	Away	3–0	216	Howe, Ginty, Branston
21 July	Liverpool	Home	0–0	9,339	
24 July	Stevenage Borough	Away	1–1	1,500	Low
26 July	Kettering Town	Away			Cancelled due to waterlogged pitch
28 July	Billericay Town	Away	3–3	935	McLean, Whelpdale, Howe
31 July	Birmingham City	Home	0–3	4,371	
4 August	Manchester United	Home	1–3	11,574	Howe
8 August	Bedford Town	Away	0–1	379	

=== Football League Two ===
Date	Opponent	Venue	Result	Pos	Attendance	Scorers	Ref.
11 August	Rochdale	Home	3–0	2nd	5,575	Low, McLean, Crow	
19 August	Rotherham United	Away	1–3	8th	4,291	McLean	
25 August	Chesterfield	Home	2–3	15th	5,005	Lee, McLean	
1 September	Accrington Stanley	Away	2–0	7th	1,484	Lee, McLean	
8 September	Mansfield Town	Home	2–1	4th	4,721	Low, Crow	
15 September	Bradford City	Away	0–1	9th	13,819		
22 September	Morecambe	Home	1–1	9th	4,473	McLean	
29 September	Darlington	Away	1–1	10th	3,974	Mackail-Smith	
2 October	Shrewsbury Town	Away	2–0	7th	5,220	Lee, Boyd	
6 October	Grimsby Town	Home	2–1	7th	4,786	Boyd, McLean	
13 October	Wycombe Wanderers	Home	2–1	6th	4,567	McLean, Lee	
20 October	Lincoln City	Away	1–1	6th	5,036	Croft (o.g.)	
27 October	Hereford United	Home	1–1	6th	5,008	Mackail-Smith	
3 November	Stockport County	Away	2–1	5th	5,042	Mackail-Smith, McLean	
6 November	Dagenham and Redbridge	Home	3–1	5th	4,200	Keates, McLean (2)	
17 November	Bury	Away	0–2	5th	2,660		
24 November	Brentford	Home	7–0	3rd	4,865	McLean (3), Whelpdale, Boyd, Mackail-Smith, Howe	
4 December	Notts County	Away	1–0	3rd	4,412	Mackail-Smith	
8 December	Chester City	Away	2–1	2nd	2,291	McLean, Mackail-Smith	
15 December	Milton Keynes Dons	Home	1–2	3rd	10,351	McLean	
22 December	Bradford City	Home	2–1	2nd	5,355	McLean, Hughes	
26 December	Mansfield Town	Away	0–2	3rd	3,107		
29 December	Morecambe	Away	2–3	4th	2,371	Morgan, Lee	
1 January	Shrewsbury Town	Home	2–1	5th	5,062	Lee, Morgan	
12 January	Macclesfield Town	Home	0–1	6th	5,238		
15 January	Accrington Stanley	Home	8–2	5th	4,257	Boyd (3), McLean (3), Mackail-Smith (2)	
29 January 2008	Rotherham United	Home	3–1		5,152	Lee, McLean, Mackail-Smith	
2 February 2008	Rochdale	Away	2–0		3,076	Boyd, McLean	
9 February 2008	Wrexham	Home	0–0		5,505		
13 February 2008	Chesterfield	Away	2–1		3,973	McLean, Boyd	
16 February 2008	Barnet	Home	1–0		5,520	Hatch	
23 February 2008	Macclesfield Town	Away	3–0		2,094	Boyd, Whelpdale, McLean	
26 February 2008	Wrexham	Away	2–0		4,103	Day (2)	
1 March 2008	Bury	Home	1–0		6,150	Keates	
4 March 2008	Barnet	Away	2–0		2,202	Keates, Day	
8 March 2008	Dagenham & Redbridge	Away	3–2		3,130	Boyd, Mackail-Smith, McLean	
11 March 2008	Brentford	Away	2–1		4,049	McLean, Mackail-Smith	
15 March 2008	Notts County	Home	0–0		7,173		
21 March 2008	Milton Keynes Dons	Away	1–1		14,521	Whelpdale	
24 March 2008	Chester City	Home	1–0		6,457	Keates	
29 March 2008	Lincoln City	Home	4–0		8,035	McLean (2), Rendell (2)	
5 April 2008	Wycombe Wanderers	Away	2–2		6,202	Boyd, Hatch	
12 April 2008	Stockport County	Home	0–1		10,023		
19 April 2008	Hereford United	Away	1–0		5,279	Keates	
26 April 2008	Grimsby Town	Away	4–1		4,125	McLean (2), Mackail-Smith, Rendell	
3 May 2008	Darlington	Home	0–2	2nd	10,400		

=== FA Cup ===
Date	Round	Opponent	Venue	Result	Attendance	Scorers
10 November	Round 1	Wrexham	Home	4–1	4,266	Mackail-Smith (3), McLean
1 December	Round 2	Staines Town	Away	5–0	2,460	Mackail-Smith (4), McLean
5 January	Round 3	Colchester United F.C.	Away	3–1	4,003	McLean, Boyd, Lee
26 January	Round 4	West Bromwich Albion F.C.	Home	0–3	12,701	

=== League Cup ===
Date	Round	Opponent	Venue	Result	Attendance	Scorers
13 August	First round	Southampton	Home	2–1	4,087	Rasiak (o.g.), Boyd
28 August	Second round	West Bromwich Albion	Home	0–2	4,917	

=== Football League Trophy ===
Date	Round	Opponent	Venue	Result	Attendance	Scorers
4 September	First round	Nottingham Forest	Away	3–2	3,102	Lee, Chambers (o.g.), Boyd
8 October	Second round	Milton Keynes Dons	Away	1–3	5,087	McLean

== Statistics ==
=== Goal scorers ===
Pos	Player	League	Cup	Total
1	(England) Aaron McLean	29	4	33
2	(Scotland) Craig Mackail-Smith	12	7	19
3	(Scotland) George Boyd	12	3	15
4	(England) Charlie Lee	6	2	8
5	(England) Dean Keates	5	0	5
6	(England) Scott Rendell	3	0	3
7	(England) Jamie Day	3	0	3
8	(England) Chris Whelpdale	3	0	3

=== Cards ===
Pos	Player	Sent off (straight red)	Booked
1	(Wales) Craig Morgan	1	10
2	(France) Claude Gnakpa	0	10
3	(England) Aaron McLean	0	9
4	(England) Jamie Day	0	9
5	(England) Charlie Lee	0	8
6	(England) Chris Whelpdale	0	4
7	(England) Kieran Charnock	0	4
8	(England) Chris Westwood	0	3

== See also ==
- 2007–08 Football League
