= 2008–09 Peterborough United F.C. season =

Peterborough United
2008–09 season
- Chairman: Darragh MacAnthony
- Manager: Darren Ferguson
- Stadium: London Road Stadium
- League One: 2nd (promoted)
- FA Cup: Third round
- Football League Cup: First round
- Johnstone's Paint Trophy: Second round
- Top goalscorer: League: Craig Mackail-Smith (23); All: Craig Mackail-Smith (26)
- Highest home attendance: 14,110 (28 March vs. Leicester)
- Lowest home attendance: 4,876 (6 September vs. Bristol Rovers)
| Home colours | Away colours |

The 2008–09 season was Peterborough United's 49th year in the Football League and their first season in League One since the 2004–05 season, having been promoted from League Two in the previous season. Peterborough had a successful league campaign, finishing second, and in doing so, securing promotion to the Championship. Along with League One, the club also participated in the FA Cup, League Cup and Football League Trophy, in which they were knocked out in the third, first and second rounds respectively. The season covered the period from 1 July 2008 to 30 June 2009.

== Squad ==
Note: Flags indicate national team as defined under FIFA eligibility rules; some limited exceptions apply. Players may hold more than one non-FIFA nationality.

| No. | Pos. | Nation | Player |
|---|---|---|---|
| 1 | GK | ENG | Joe Lewis |
| 2 | DF | ENG | Russell Martin (captain) |
| 3 | DF | ENG | Shane Blackett |
| 4 | DF | WAL | Craig Morgan |
| 5 | DF | ENG | Chris Westwood |
| 6 | DF | ENG | Charlie Lee |
| 7 | FW | ENG | Scott Rendell |
| 8 | MF | IRL | Lee Frecklington |
| 9 | FW | ENG | Aaron McLean |
| 10 | MF | SCO | George Boyd |
| 11 | MF | ENG | Dean Keates (vice-captain) |
| 12 | FW | SCO | Craig Mackail-Smith |
| 13 | GK | IRL | James McKeown |
| 14 | FW | ENG | Liam Hatch |
| 15 | MF | SCO | Paul Coutts |
| 16 | FW | ENG | Rene Howe |
| 17 | DF | ENG | Jamie Day |
| 18 | MF | ENG | Chris Whelpdale |

| No. | Pos. | Nation | Player |
|---|---|---|---|
| 19 | DF | ENG | Kieran Charnock |
| 20 | MF | ENG | Alfie Potter |
| 21 | DF | CYP | Tom Williams |
| 22 | MF | ARG | Sergio Torres |
| 23 | MF | ENG | Billy Crook |
| 24 | FW | ENG | Shaun Batt |
| 25 | MF | ENG | Dominic Green |
| 26 | DF | COD | Gabriel Zakuani |
| 27 | FW | ENG | Ben Wright |
| 28 | DF | ENG | Craig Braham-Barrett |
| 29 | MF | ENG | Lewis Webb |
| 31 | DF | ENG | Sam Gaughran |
| 32 | DF | ENG | Danny Andrew |
| 33 | DF | ENG | Danny Blanchett |
| 34 | GK | ENG | Mark Tyler |
| 38 | FW | ENG | Kwesi Appiah |
| — | MF | ENG | Tommy Rowe |

== Fixtures and results ==
=== Football League One ===
==== League table ====
| Pos | Team | Pld | W | D | L | GF | GA | GD | Pts | Promotion or relegation |
|---|---|---|---|---|---|---|---|---|---|---|
| 1 | Leicester City (C, P) | 46 | 27 | 15 | 4 | 84 | 39 | +45 | 96 | Promotion to Football League Championship |
| 2 | Peterborough United (P) | 46 | 26 | 11 | 9 | 78 | 54 | +24 | 89 | Promotion to Football League Championship |
| 3 | Milton Keynes Dons | 46 | 26 | 9 | 11 | 83 | 47 | +36 | 87 | Qualification for League One play-offs |
| 4 | Leeds United | 46 | 26 | 6 | 14 | 77 | 49 | +28 | 84 | Qualification for League One play-offs |
| 5 | Millwall | 46 | 25 | 7 | 14 | 63 | 53 | +10 | 82 | Qualification for League One play-offs |

Updated to match(es) played on 2 May 2009. Source: The Football League
Rules for classification: 1) points; 2) goal difference; 3) number of goals scored.
(C) Champions; (P) Promoted

== Matches ==
League One match details
| Date | Opponent | Venue | Result | Score F–A | Scorers | Attendance | Ref. |
|---|---|---|---|---|---|---|---|
| 9 August 2008 | Southend United | A | L | 0–1 | | 8,665 | |
| 16 August 2008 | Leyton Orient | H | W | 3–0 | Mackail-Smith (2) 44', 69', McLean 50' | 6,643 | |
| 23 August 2008 | Scunthorpe United | A | L | 0–1 | | 4,717 | |
| 30 August 2008 | Hartlepool United | H | L | 1–2 | Boyd 78' | 5,728 | |
| 6 September 2008 | Bristol Rovers | H | W | 5–4 | Mackail-Smith (3) 16', 51' pen., 65', McLean 23', Rendell 83' | 4,876 | |
| 13 September 2008 | Northampton Town | A | D | 1–1 | Boyd 15' | 6,520 | |
| 20 September 2008 | Tranmere Rovers | H | D | 2–2 | Mackail-Smith 41', Zakuani 77' | 5,735 | |
| 27 September 2008 | Milton Keynes Dons | A | W | 2–1 | Mackail-Smith 73' pen., Green 75' | 10,876 | |
| 4 October 2008 | Leeds United | H | W | 2–0 | Boyd 47', Mackail-Smith 90' | 13,191 | |
| 11 October 2008 | Walsall | A | W | 2–1 | Batt 2', Whelpdale 43' | 4,792 | |
| 18 October 2008 | Carlisle United | A | D | 3–3 | Lee 34', Mackail-Smith (2) 60' pen., 90' | 6,074 | |
| 21 October 2008 | Brighton & Hove Albion | H | D | 0–0 | | 5,772 | |
| 25 October 2008 | Huddersfield Town | H | W | 4–0 | McLean (2) 12', 63', Boyd 24', Whelpdale 55' | 7,064 | |
| 28 October 2008 | Crewe Alexandra | A | D | 1–1 | McLean 14' | 3,699 | |
| 1 November 2008 | Hereford United | H | W | 2–0 | Mackail-Smith (2) 35', 68' | 6,087 | |
| 15 November 2008 | Yeovil Town | A | W | 1–0 | McLean 36' | 4,001 | |
| 22 November 2008 | Colchester United | H | W | 2–1 | Mackail-Smith 45', Boyd 63' | 7,401 | |
| 25 November 2008 | Swindon Town | A | D | 2–2 | McGovern 20' o.g., Batt 90' | 6,616 | |
| 6 December 2008 | Stockport County | A | W | 3–1 | Raynes 22' o.g., Mackail-Smith 62', Tunnicliffe 75' o.g. | 6,148 | |
| 13 December 2008 | Oldham Athletic | H | D | 2–2 | Stam 12' o.g., McLean 37' | 6,219 | |
| 20 December 2008 | Leicester City | A | L | 0–4 | | 23,390 | |
| 26 December 2008 | Millwall | H | W | 1–0 | McLean 23' | 9,351 | |
| 28 December 2008 | Cheltenham Town | A | W | 6–3 | Boyd 3', Lee 60', Mackail-Smith 63', Wright 75' o.g., McLean 87', Whelpdale 90' | 3,976 | |
| 17 January 2009 | Walsall | H | W | 1–0 | Whelpdale 6' | 5,705 | |
| 20 January 2009 | Milton Keynes Dons | H | D | 0–0 | | 8,982 | |
| 24 January 2009 | Leeds United | A | L | 1–3 | Mackail-Smith 79' | 22,776 | |
| 27 January 2009 | Crewe Alexandra | H | W | 4–2 | Boyd (2) 50', 87', McLean 53', Keates 69' | 5,782 | |
| 31 January 2009 | Huddersfield Town | A | L | 0–1 | | 14,480 | |
| 10 February 2009 | Brighton & Hove Albion | A | W | 4–2 | Mackail-Smith 38', McLean (2) 42', 76', Keates 65' pen. | 5,782 | |
| 14 February 2009 | Yeovil Town | H | L | 1–3 | McLean 56' | 6,129 | |
| 17 February 2009 | Tranmere Rovers | A | D | 1–1 | Mackail-Smith 37' | 4,862 | |
| 21 February 2009 | Hereford United | A | W | 1–0 | McLean 3' | 3,217 | |
| 24 February 2009 | Carlisle United | H | W | 1–0 | McLean 69' | 5,103 | |
| 28 February 2009 | Southend United | H | L | 1–2 | Keates 6' pen. | 7,341 | |
| 3 March 2009 | Leyton Orient | A | W | 3–2 | Whelpdale 6', Torres 12', Martin 45' | 3,381 | |
| 7 March 2009 | Hartlepool United | A | W | 2–1 | Keates 11', Boyd 48' | 3,722 | |
| 10 March 2009 | Scunthorpe United | H | W | 2–1 | Whelpdale 63', Mackail-Smith 86' | 5,637 | |
| 14 March 2009 | Northampton Town | H | W | 1–0 | Lee 33' | 8,881 | |
| 21 March 2009 | Bristol Rovers | A | W | 1–0 | McLean 70' | 7,103 | |
| 28 March 2009 | Leicester City | H | W | 2–0 | Lee 44', Whelpdale 79' | 14,110 | |
| 4 April 2009 | Oldham Athletic | A | W | 2–1 | Mackail-Smith 26', 86' | 5,083 | |
| 10 April 2009 | Cheltenham Town | H | D | 1–1 | McLean 36' | 9,817 | |
| 13 April 2009 | Millwall | A | L | 0–2 | | 10,518 | |
| 18 April 2009 | Stockport County | H | W | 1–0 | Mackail-Smith 25' | 8,333 | |
| 25 April 2009 | Colchester United | A | W | 1–0 | Lee 40' | 6,532 | |
| 2 May 2009 | Swindon Town | H | D | 2–2 | Mackail-Smith 40', Keates 90' | 10,886 | |

=== FA Cup ===
FA Cup match details
| Round | Date | Opponent | Venue | Result | Score F–A | Scorers | Attendance | Ref. |
|---|---|---|---|---|---|---|---|---|
| First round | 9 November 2008 | A.F.C. Hornchurch | A | W | 1–0 | Mackail-Smith 90' | 3,000 | |
| Second round | 29 November 2008 | Tranmere Rovers | H | D | 0–0 | | 5,980 | |
| Second round replay | 9 December 2008 | Tranmere Rovers | A | W | 2–1 (aet) | McLean 90', Mackail-Smith 114' | 3,139 | |
| Third round | 3 January 2009 | West Bromwich Albion | A | D | 1–1 | Mackail-Smith 87' | 18,659 | |
| Third round replay | 13 January 2009 | West Bromwich Albion | H | L | 0–2 | | 10,735 | |

=== League Cup ===
League Cup match details
| Round | Date | Opponents | Venue | Result | Score F–A | Scorers | Attendance | Ref. |
|---|---|---|---|---|---|---|---|---|
| First round | 12 August 2008 | Bristol City | A | L | 1–2 | Boyd 17' | 5,684 | |

=== Football League Trophy ===
Football League Trophy match details
| Round | Date | Opponents | Venue | Result | Score F–A | Scorers | Attendance | Ref. |
|---|---|---|---|---|---|---|---|---|
| Second round | 7 October 2008 | Dagenham & Redbridge | Home | L | 0–1 | | 2,644 | |

== Transfers ==
=== In ===
| Date | Pos. | Player | From | Fee | Ref. |
|---|---|---|---|---|---|
| 22 May 2008 | FW | Scott Rendell | Cambridge United | Undisclosed | |

=== Loans in ===
| Date from | Pos. | Player | From | Duration | Ref. |
|---|---|---|---|---|---|
| 19 November 2008 | MF | Andrew Crofts | Gillingham | Until January 2009 | |
| 6 February 2009 | MF | Lee Frecklington | Lincoln City | Three months | |

=== Out ===
| Date | Pos. | Player | To | Fee | Ref. |
|---|---|---|---|---|---|
| 1 July 2008 | MF | Adam Newton | (Brentford) | Contract terminated | |

=== Loans out ===
| Date from | Pos. | Player | To | Duration | Ref. |
|---|---|---|---|---|---|
| 1 August 2008 | GK | Shwan Jalal | AFC Bournemouth | One month | |
| 18 November 2008 | FW | Scott Rendell | Cambridge United | Until 1 January 2009 | |
| 19 January 2009 | FW | Scott Rendell | Cambridge United | Until end of season | |
