= Danny Blanchett =

English footballer

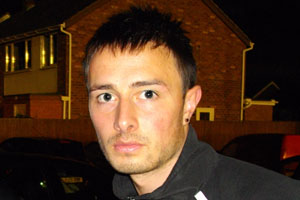
- Blanchett in 2010

Personal information
- Full name: Daniel William Blanchett
- Date of birth: 6 May 1987 (age 39)
- Place of birth: Wembley, England
- Height: 5 ft 11 in (1.80 m)
- Position: Defender

Youth career
- 2002–2004: Queens Park Rangers

Senior career*
Years	Team	Apps	(Gls)
2004	Northwood	0	(0)
2004–2005	Hendon	7	(0)
2005–2006	Harrow Borough		
2006–2007	Cambridge City	33	(1)
2006	→ Harrow Borough (loan)		
2007–2010	Peterborough United	7	(1)
2009	→ Stevenage Borough (loan)	0	(0)
2009	→ Hereford United (loan)	13	(0)
2010	→ AFC Wimbledon (loan)	11	(0)
2010–2011	Crewe Alexandra	39	(0)
2011–2012	Burton Albion	14	(0)
2012–2013	York City	4	(0)
2013	Cambridge City	17	(0)
2013–2016	Havant & Waterlooville	68	(3)
2016–2017	Chelmsford City	20	(0)
2017	Hayes & Yeading United	4	(0)
- * Club domestic league appearances and goals as of 22:03, 9 March 2019 (UTC)

Daniel William "Danny" Blanchett (born 6 May 1987) is an English semi-professional footballer who last played as a defender for Hayes & Yeading United.

== Career ==
=== Early career ===
Born in Wembley, London, Blanchett started his career with the Queens Park Rangers youth system, where he played from 2002 to 2004. He trialled with Wigan Athletic and Wycombe Wanderers before signing for Isthmian League Premier Division Northwood at the start of the 2004–05 season. After failing to make any appearances he joined Isthmian League Premier Division rivals Hendon in December 2004, making seven appearances before the end of the season.

Blanchett signed for Harrow Borough in the summer of 2005, and having scored 1 goal in 33 appearances signed for Cambridge City of the Conference South on 3 March 2006. However, he returned to Harrow as injury cover later in the same month, making one appearance during a loan spell. He finished 2005–06 with 10 appearances and 1 goal for City.

He was a regular for City throughout 2006–07, however a challenge by a Newport County player cracked Blanchett's calcaneus. Spending months on the sidelines, he finally returned to fitness after some light therapy sessions.

=== Peterborough United ===
Blanchett had a two-week trial at Liverpool starting in February 2007 and the Premier League club considered a transfer for the player, who was rated between £25,000 and £50,000. Having made 24 appearances for City in 2006–07, Blanchett was signed by League Two club Peterborough United for an undisclosed fee on 19 March 2007. His debut came on 9 April 2007 as an 89th-minute substitute for George Boyd in a 2–0 home win over Mansfield Town. His first goal for the club came on his third appearance with a 22-yard shot, playing the second half of a 3–3 home draw with Rochdale on 5 May 2007.

The 2007–08 season saw him make his first start for the club, in a 9 October 2007 Football League Trophy tie with Milton Keynes Dons at Stadium mk. Milton Keynes won 3–1. He made his first league start against Macclesfield Town on 23 February 2008. He was deputising for Jamie Day, who had injured his back before kick-off, Peterborough winning 3–0. Indeed, he made just two appearances for the promotion-winning League Two team that season and was placed on the transfer list in May 2008. He made just three League One appearances and also played one FA Cup match in 2008–09, before again being transfer listed in May 2009.

In July 2009, he joined Port Vale for pre-season training. He played 90 minutes for Vale in what turned out to be a pre-season friendly defeat, Vale losing 1–0 to Biddulph Victoria of the Midland Football Alliance. On 7 August 2009, Blanchett joined Conference Premier club Stevenage Borough on a one-month loan, but did not make any first-team appearances. Blanchett joined League Two club Hereford United on 17 September 2009 on loan, making his debut two days later in a 2–0 victory at home to Accrington Stanley. He was played out of position at centre-back, but following the game said "Centre-back isn't my usual position – I've played left back all my life – but I find it quite comfortable". He stayed on loan with Hereford until December 2010, making 16 appearances.

In January 2010, he joined Conference Premier club AFC Wimbledon on loan until the end of the season. He finished the loan with 12 appearances and after returning to Peterborough was released on 30 April 2010.

=== Crewe Alexandra ===
He signed a one-year contract with League Two club Crewe Alexandra on 23 July 2010 after a successful trial. Despite making 44 appearances in 2010–11, he was released by Crewe on 12 May 2011.

=== Burton Albion ===
Following his release by Crewe, Blanchett began training with Championship club Derby County at the start of July 2011. He signed for Burton Albion of League Two on 30 July 2011 on a one-year contract. He was released on 8 May 2012 after making 16 appearances in 2011–12.

=== York City ===
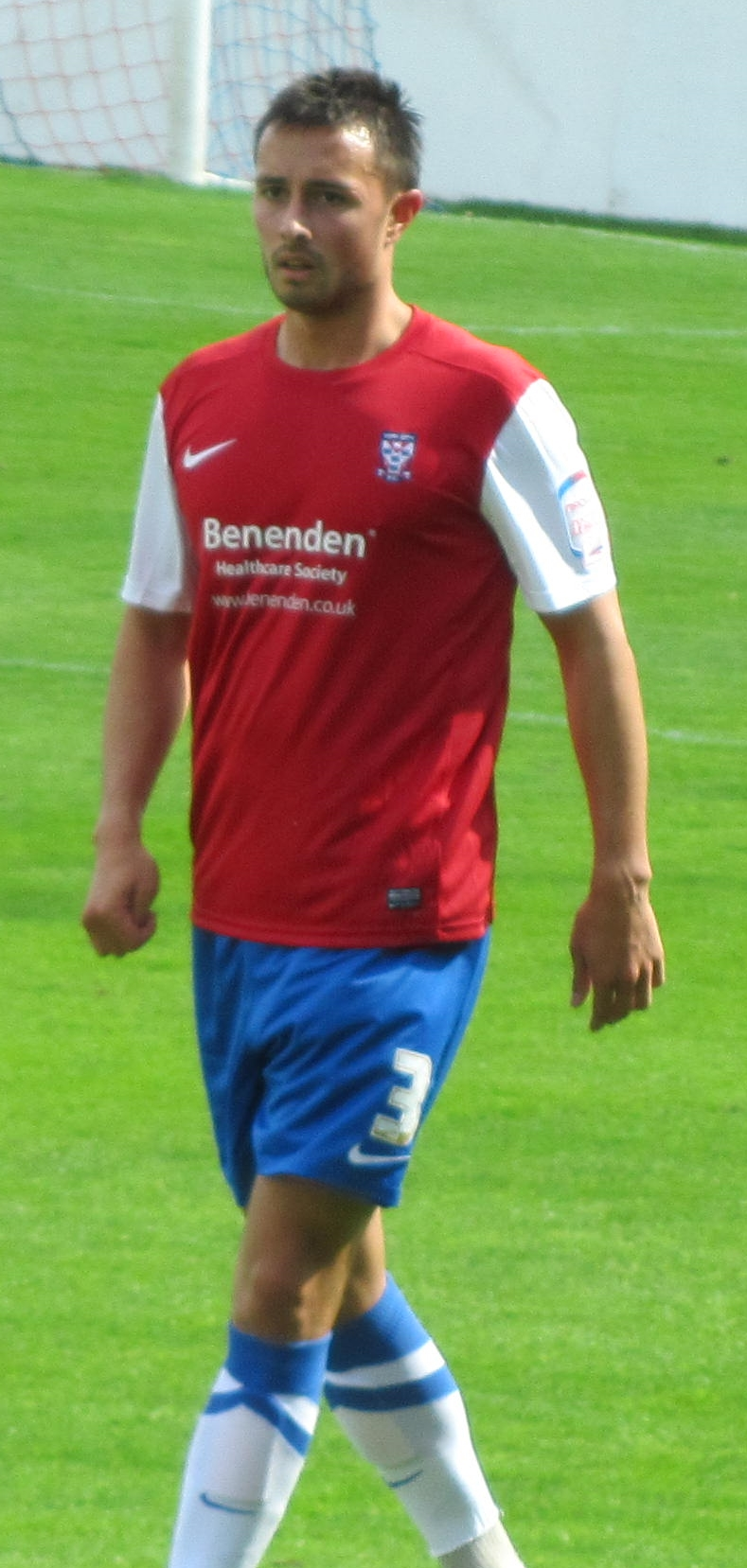
Blanchett playing for York City in 2012

Blanchett signed for newly promoted League Two club York City on 2 July 2012 on a one-year contract. He made his debut in York's 2–2 draw away to Morecambe on 21 August 2012. Having made four appearances for York, he was released by the club on 24 January 2013 after his contract was cancelled by mutual consent.

=== Later career ===
On 30 January 2013, Blanchett returned to Cambridge City, now playing in the Southern League Premier Division, on non-contract terms for the remainder of 2012–13.

Blanchett signed for Conference South club Havant & Waterlooville on 26 June 2013.

On 27 May 2016, Blanchett become new manager Rod Stringer's first recruit, alongside fellow former Havant & Waterlooville teammate Shamir Mullings, for National League South club Chelmsford City. After departing Chelmsford at the end of the season, Blanchett signed for Hayes & Yeading United ahead of the 2017–18 season. After starting in Hayes' first seven games in all competitions of the season, Blanchett left the club.

== Career statistics ==
As of match played 3 December 2016

Appearances and goals by club, season and competition
Club	Season	League			FA Cup		League Cup		Other		Total	
Club	Season	Division	Apps	Goals	Apps	Goals	Apps	Goals	Apps	Goals	Apps	Goals
Hendon	2004–05	Isthmian League Premier Division	7	0	—		—		—		7	0
Cambridge City	2005–06	Conference South	10	1	—		—		—		10	1
Cambridge City	2006–07	Conference South	23	0	1	0	—		0	0	24	0
Cambridge City	Total		33	1	1	0	—		0	0	34	1
Peterborough United	2006–07	League Two	3	1	—		—		—		3	1
Peterborough United	2007–08	League Two	1	0	0	0	0	0	1 (Note: Appearance(s) in Football League Trophy)	0	2	0
Peterborough United	2008–09	League One	3	0	1	0	0	0	0	0	4	0
Peterborough United	2009–10	Championship	0	0	—		0	0	—		0	0
Peterborough United	Total		7	1	1	0	0	0	1	0	9	1
Stevenage Borough (loan)	2009–10	Conference Premier	0	0	—		—		—		0	0
Hereford United (loan)	2009–10	League Two	13	0	2	0	—		1	0	16	0
AFC Wimbledon (loan)	2009–10	Conference Premier	11	0	—		—		1 (Note: Appearance in FA Trophy)	0	12	0
Crewe Alexandra	2010–11	League Two	39	0	1	0	2	0	2	0	44	0
Burton Albion	2011–12	League Two	14	0	1	0	0	0	1	0	16	0
York City	2012–13	League Two	4	0	0	0	0	0	0	0	4	0
Cambridge City	2012–13	Southern League Premier Division	17	0	—		—		1 (Note: Appearance in Cambridgeshire Invitation Cup)	0	18	0
Havant & Waterlooville	2013–14	Conference South	35	2	2	0	—		10 (Note: Four appearances in Hampshire Senior Cup, six in FA Trophy)	0	47	2
Havant & Waterlooville	2014–15	Conference South	19	1	1	0	—		8 (Note: Two appearances in Hampshire Senior Cup, three in Portsmouth Senior Cup, three in FA Trophy)	0	28	1
Havant & Waterlooville	2015–16	National League South	14	0	5	0	—		6 (Note: Three appearances in Hampshire Senior Cup, two appearances in FA Trophy, one appearance and one goal in Portsmouth Senior Cup)	1	25	1
Havant & Waterlooville	Total		68	3	8	0	—		24	1	100	4
Chelmsford City	2016–17	National League South	16	0	0	0	—		2 (Note: One appearance in Essex Senior Cup, one in FA Trophy)	0	18	0
Career total			229	5	14	0	2	0	33	1	278	6
