= 2009–10 Peterborough United F.C. season =

Peterborough United
2009–10 season
- Chairman: Barry Fry; Darragh MacAnthony
- Manager: Darren Ferguson; Mark Cooper; Jim Gannon; Gary Johnson
- Stadium: London Road Stadium
- Championship: 24th (relegated)
- FA Cup: Third round
- Football League Cup: Fourth round
- Top goalscorer: League: George Boyd (9); All: George Boyd (12)
- Highest home attendance: 12,711 (3 Oct vs. Nott'ham Forest)
- Lowest home attendance: 5,451 (25 Aug vs. Ipswich Town)
Home colours	Away colours	Third colours

During the 2009–10 Peterborough United F.C. season saw the club play in the Football League Championship after promotion from Football League One in 2008–09.

== Squad ==
Note: Flags indicate national team as defined under FIFA eligibility rules; some limited exceptions apply. Players may hold more than one non-FIFA nationality.

No.	Pos.	Nation	Player
1	GK	(England) ENG	Joe Lewis
2	DF	(England) ENG	Kerrea Gilbert (on loan from Arsenal)
3	DF	(Cyprus) CYP	Tom Williams (at Preston North End)
4	DF	(Wales) WAL	Craig Morgan
5	DF	(Democratic Republic of the Congo) COD	Gabriel Zakuani
6	DF	(England) ENG	Charlie Lee
7	FW	(England) ENG	Liam Dickinson (on loan from Brighton & Hove Albion)
8	MF	(Ireland) EIR	Lee Frecklington
9	FW	(England) ENG	Aaron McLean
10	MF	(Scotland) SCO	George Boyd (at Nottingham Forest)
11	FW	(England) ENG	Izale McLeod (on loan from Charlton Athletic)
12	FW	(Scotland) SCO	Craig Mackail-Smith
13	GK	(Ireland) EIR	James McKeown
14	MF	(England) ENG	Tommy Rowe
15	MF	(France) FRA	Toumani Diagouraga (at Brentford)
16	DF	(England) ENG	Mark Little (on loan from Wolverhampton)
17	DF	(England) ENG	Jamie Day (at Dagenham & Redbridge)
18	MF	(England) ENG	Chris Whelpdale
19	MF	(England) ENG	Shaun Batt (at Millwall)
20	FW	(England) ENG	Ben Wright
24	DF	(England) ENG	Danny Andrew

No.	Pos.	Nation	Player
21	DF	(England) ENG	Sam Gaughran
22	MF	(Argentina) ARG	Sergio Torres
23	MF	(England) ENG	Billy Crook
24	DF	(England) ENG	Danny Andrew
25	MF	(England) ENG	Dominic Green
26	FW	(England) ENG	Danny Mills
27	MF	(England) ENG	Romone McCrae
28	FW	(England) ENG	Kwesi Appiah
29	DF	(England) ENG	Ryan Bennett
30	DF	(England) ENG	Scott Griffiths
31	MF	(England) ENG	Nathan Koranteng
32	GK	(England) ENG	Sam Cole
33	MF	(England) ENG	Josh Simpson
34	DF	(England) ENG	Exodus Geohaghon
35	FW	(England) ENG	Reuben Reid (on loan from West Bromwich Albion)

== Competitions ==
=== Championship ===
==== League table ====
Pos	Team	Pld	W	D	L	GF	GA	GD	Pts	Promotion, qualification or relegation
20	Scunthorpe United	46	14	10	22	62	84	−22	52	
21	Crystal Palace	46	14	17	15	50	53	−3	49 (Note: Crystal Palace were given a ten-point deduction for entering administration.)	
22	Sheffield Wednesday (R)	46	11	14	21	49	69	−20	47	Relegation to Football League One
23	Plymouth Argyle (R)	46	11	8	27	43	68	−25	41	Relegation to Football League One
24	Peterborough United (R)	46	8	10	28	46	80	−34	34	Relegation to Football League One

Source: The Football League
Rules for classification: 1) points; 2) goal difference; 3) number of goals scored.
(R) Relegated

==== Matches ====
8 August 2009	Derby County	2–1	Peterborough United	Derby
15:00 BST	Addison 4'; Buxton (yellow card) 59'; Teale 87'	Report	Keates (yellow card) 39'; Batt (yellow card) 71'; Boyd 84' (pen.) (yellow card) 88'	Stadium: Pride Park Stadium; Attendance: 33,010; Referee: Paul Taylor

15 August 2009	Peterborough United	1–1	Sheffield Wednesday	Peterborough
15:00 BST	Mackail-Smith 61'	Report	O'Connor 21' (yellow card) 45+1'	Stadium: London Road Stadium; Attendance: 10,747; Referee: Andy D'Urso

18 August 2009	Peterborough United	2–3	West Bromwich Albion	Peterborough
19:45 BST	Batt (yellow card) 16'; Coutts (yellow card) 26'; Mackail-Smith 45+1'; McLean 53'	Report	Moore 3', 34'; Brunt 41'; Dorrans (yellow card) 50' (red card) 90+6'; Martis (yellow card) 78'	Stadium: London Road Stadium; Attendance: 8,752; Referee: Graham Horwood

22 August 2009	Preston North End	2–0	Peterborough United	Preston
15:00 BST	Mellor 8'; Nicholson (yellow card) 23'; Jones 30'; Carter (yellow card) 38'; Davidson (yellow card) 39'	Report	Zakuani (yellow card) 45+3'	Stadium: Deepdale; Attendance: 11,549; Referee: David Webb

31 August 2009	Peterborough United	1–1	Crystal Palace	Peterborough
19:45 BST	Boyd (yellow card) 53'; Batt 53'; Frecklington (yellow card) 89'	Report	McCarthy (yellow card) 25' (yellow-red card) 74'; Lee 64'	Stadium: London Road Stadium; Attendance: 8,473; Referee: Kevin Friend

12 September 2009	Queens Park Rangers	1–1	Peterborough United	Shepherd's Bush
15:00 BST	Routledge 34'; Connolly (yellow card) 81'; Borrowdale (yellow card) 88'	Report	McLean 16'; Zakuani (yellow card) 33'; Batt (yellow card) 90+3'	Stadium: Loftus Road; Attendance: 11,814; Referee: Oliver Langford

15 September 2009	Leicester City	1–1	Peterborough United	Leicester
19:45 BST	Oakley (yellow card) 45+2'; Fryatt 47' (pen.)	Report	Morgan (yellow card) 24'; Boyd 32' (pen.); Frecklington (yellow card) 66'; McLean (yellow card) 68'; Diagouraga (yellow card) 77'	Stadium: King Power Stadium; Attendance: 21,485; Referee: Russell Booth

19 September 2009	Peterborough United	3–2	Reading	Peterborough
15:00 BST	Mackail-Smith 48'; McLean 54'; Boyd 90+1'	Report	Howard (yellow card) 16'; Sigurðsson 30'; Church 42'; Pearce (yellow card) 70'	Stadium: London Road Stadium; Attendance: 8,521; Referee: Christopher Sarginson

26 September 2009	Blackpool	2–0	Peterborough United	Blackpool
15:00 BST	Euell 3'; Bouazza 11'	Report		Stadium: Bloomfield Road; Attendance: 7,728; Referee: Anthony Bates

29 September 2009	Peterborough United	1–2	Plymouth Argyle	Peterborough
19:45 BST	Mackail-Smith 86' (yellow card) 87'	Report	Mackie 63' (yellow card) 85'; Fallon 69'; Fletcher (yellow card) 88'	Stadium: London Road Stadium; Attendance: 7,114; Referee: Andy Penn

3 October 2009	Peterborough United	1–2	Nottingham Forest	Peterborough
15:00 BST	Williams (yellow card) 45+4'; McLean 50'	Report	McGoldrick (yellow card) 39'; Tyson (yellow card) 45+4'; Majewski 51'; Anderson 56'; Camp (yellow card) 74'; Cohen (yellow card) 75'	Stadium: London Road Stadium; Attendance: 12,711; Referee: Jonathan Moss

17 October 2009	Bristol City	1–1	Peterborough United	Bristol
15:00 BST	Skuse 31'; Haynes (yellow card) 78'	Report	Day (yellow card) 75'; Morgan (yellow card) 76'; Boyd 90'	Stadium: Ashton Gate; Attendance: 13,833; Referee: Jarnail Singh

20 October 2009	Doncaster Rovers	3–1	Peterborough United	Doncaster
19:45 BST	Sharp 17'; Shiels 21'; Shackell 85'	Report	McLean 32'	Stadium: Keepmoat Stadium; Attendance: 9,288; Referee: Colin Webster

24 October 2009	Peterborough United	3–0	Scunthorpe United	Peterborough
15:00 BST	Boyd 25', 78' (pen.); Mackail-Smith 45+1'; McLean (yellow card) 85'	Report	Murphy (yellow card) 78'; Woolford (yellow card) 82'; Hayes (yellow card) 90+4'	Stadium: London Road Stadium; Attendance: 8,051; Referee: Mike Jones

31 October 2009	Peterborough United	1–2	Barnsley	Peterborough
15:00 BST	Boyd 24' (pen.)	Report	Bogdanović 26' (yellow card) 27'; Macken 39'; Shotton (yellow card) 62'; Doyle (yellow card) 73'; Foster (yellow card) 79'	Stadium: London Road Stadium; Attendance: 8,556; Referee: Carl Boyeson

7 November 2009	Newcastle United	3–1	Peterborough United	Newcastle-upon-Tyne
15:00 BST	Gutiérrez 15'; Carroll 18'; Simpson 52'	Report	Keates 79'; Bennett (yellow card) 88'	Stadium: St James' Park; Attendance: 43,067; Referee: Andy D'Urso

21 November 2009	Sheffield United	1–0	Peterborough United	Sheffield
15:00 BST	Camara 42'	Report		Stadium: Bramall Lane; Attendance: 25,144; Referee: Grant Hegley

28 November 2009	Peterborough United	2–2	Middlesbrough	Peterborough
15:00 BST	Boyd 54'; McLean (yellow card) 61'; Batt 76' (yellow card) 77'	Report	Kitson 28', 58' (yellow card) 41'	Stadium: London Road Stadium; Attendance: 10,772; Referee: David Phillips

5 December 2009	Peterborough United	2–2	Swansea City	Peterborough
15:00 BST	Whelpdale 55'; Griffiths (yellow card) 59'; McLean 90+5'	Report	Trundle 84', 90+2'	Stadium: London Road Stadium; Attendance: 7,312; Referee: Russell Booth

8 December 2009	Ipswich Town	0–0	Peterborough United	Ipswich
19:45 BST		Report	Boyd (yellow card) 45'	Stadium: Portman Road; Attendance: 19,975; Referee: Adrian Hall

12 December 2009	Coventry City	3–2	Peterborough United	Coventry
15:00 BST	Barnett (yellow card) 30'; Eastwood 34', 35', 72'; Cranie (yellow card) 61'	Report	Mackail-Smith 66', 71'; Batt (yellow card) 88'	Stadium: Ricoh Arena; Attendance: 15,190; Referee: Roger East

19 December 2009	Peterborough United	2–1	Watford	Peterborough
15:00 BST	Frecklington 9'; Geohaghon 78'	Report	Graham (yellow card) 30'; Cleverley (yellow card) 35'; Eustace 49'	Stadium: London Road Stadium; Attendance: 7,723; Referee: Karl Evans

26 December 2009	West Bromwich Albion	2–0	Peterborough United	West Bromwich
15:00 BST	Moore 61'; Bennett 67' (o.g.); Mattock (yellow card) 69'; Cox (yellow card) 74'	Report	Frecklington (yellow card) 38'; Zakuani (yellow card) 55'; Morgan (yellow card) 78'	Stadium: The Hawthorns; Attendance: 24,924; Referee: Mike Jones

28 December 2009	Peterborough United	4–4	Cardiff City	Peterborough
19:45 BST	Morgan (yellow card) 32'; Simpson 52', 90+2'; Lee 68'; Batt (yellow card) 79'; Boyd 89'	Report	Ledley 6', 23'; Bothroyd 34'; Whittingham 38'; Quinn (yellow card) 66'	Stadium: London Road Stadium; Attendance: 9,796; Referee: Dean Whitestone

16 January 2010	Peterborough United	0–3	Derby County	Peterborough
15:00 BST	Coutts (yellow card) 22'; Morgan (red card) 28'; Bennett (red card) 45+2'	Report	Hunt (yellow card) 19'; Davies 45+4'; Campbell 48', 75'	Stadium: London Road Stadium; Attendance: 10,280; Referee: Nigel Miller

23 January 2010	Sheffield Wednesday	2–1	Peterborough United	Owlerton
15:00 BST	Buxton (yellow card) 9'; Tudgay 45', 67'	Report	Livermore (yellow card) 62' (goal) 76'	Stadium: Hillsborough; Attendance: 24,882; Referee: Dave Foster

26 January 2010	Peterborough United	0–1	Preston North End	Peterborough
19:45 BST		Report	Mellor 34'; Chaplow (yellow card) 84'; Parkin (yellow card) 90+4'	Stadium: London Road Stadium; Attendance: 7,134; Referee: Darren Sheldrake

30 January 2010	Crystal Palace	2–0	Peterborough United	Selhurst
15:00 BST	Danns 28', 65'	Report		Stadium: Selhurst Park; Attendance: 14,699; Referee: Graham Salisbury

6 February 2010	Peterborough United	1–0	Queens Park Rangers	Peterborough
15:00 BST	McLean 9'; Lee (yellow card) 45+1'; Simpson (yellow card) 52'; Bennett (yellow card) 85'	Report	Leigertwood (red card) 61'; Ramage (yellow card) 73' (red card) 82'	Stadium: London Road Stadium; Attendance: 8,933; Referee: Danny McDermid

9 February 2010	Cardiff City	2–0	Peterborough United	Cardiff
19:45 BST	Burke 30'; Gerrard 78'	Report		Stadium: Cardiff City Stadium; Attendance: 17,686; Referee: Andy Penn

13 February 2010	Middlesbrough	1–0	Peterborough United	Middlesbrough
15:00 BST	Robson 7' (yellow card) 40'	Report	Frecklington (yellow card) 66'	Stadium: Riverside Stadium; Attendance: 18,412; Referee: Jonathan Moss

16 February 2010	Peterborough United	3–1	Ipswich Town	Peterborough
19:45 BST	Simpson (yellow card) 29'; Dickinson 47'; Frecklington 63'; Morgan 85'	Report	Murphy 9'; Norris (yellow card) 34'; Delaney (yellow card) 43'	Stadium: London Road Stadium; Attendance: 9,428; Referee: James Linington

27 February 2010	Swansea City	1–0	Peterborough United	Swansea
15:00 BST	Cotterill 19' (pen.)	Report		Stadium: Liberty Stadium; Attendance: 16,175; Referee: Gavin Ward

6 March 2010	Peterborough United	0–1	Coventry City	Peterborough
15:00 BST		Report	Stead 24'; Clingan (yellow card) 33'	Stadium: London Road Stadium; Attendance: 10,469; Referee: Russell Booth

9 March 2010	Peterborough United	1–0	Sheffield United	Peterborough
19:45 BST	Mackail-Smith 40'; Torres (yellow card) 47'; Dickinson (yellow card) 79'	Report	Evans (yellow card) 6'; Nosworthy (yellow card) 26'; Yeates (yellow card) 76'; Stewart (yellow card) 87'	Stadium: London Road Stadium; Attendance: 6,674; Referee: Jarnail Singh

13 March 2010	Watford	0–1	Peterborough United	Watford
15:00 BST	Lansbury (yellow card) 40'; Helguson (yellow card) 90+3'	Report	Dickinson 51'	Stadium: Vicarage Road; Attendance: 16,591; Referee: Anthony Taylor

16 March 2010	Peterborough United	1–2	Doncaster Rovers	Peterborough
19:45 BST	Lee 55'	Report	Roberts 67'; Oster 90'	Stadium: London Road Stadium; Attendance: 6,773; Referee: Fred Graham

20 March 2010	Nottingham Forest	1–0	Peterborough United	Nottingham
15:00 BST	Earnshaw 13'; Majewski (yellow card) 40'; Wilson (yellow card) 51'; Cohen (yellow card) 79'	Report		Stadium: City Ground; Attendance: 24,582; Referee: Keith Hill

23 March 2010	Scunthorpe United	4–0	Peterborough United	Scunthorpe
19:45 BST	Hayes 15'; Thompson 25', 64'; Togwell 44' (yellow card) 58'	Report	Frecklington (yellow card) 38'	Stadium: Glanford Park; Attendance: 4,995; Referee: Eddie Ilderton

27 March 2010	Peterborough United	0–1	Bristol City	Peterborough
15:00 BST	Simpson (yellow card) 20'	Report	Hartley (yellow card) 65'; Clarkson 71'	Stadium: London Road Stadium; Attendance: 6,445; Referee: David Webb

3 April 2010	Peterborough United	2–3	Newcastle United	Peterborough
15:00 BST	Green 11'; Zakuani (yellow card) 47'; Dickinson 76'	Report	Nolan 45+1'; Barton 48'; Ameobi 59'; Best (yellow card) 89'; Gutiérrez (yellow card) 90+3'	Stadium: London Road Stadium; Attendance: 12,877; Referee: Mark Haywood

5 April 2010	Barnsley	2–2	Peterborough United	Barnsley
19:45 BST	Hume 7', 84'; Potter (yellow card) 65'	Report	Bennett 5'; Geohaghon (yellow card) 40'; Rowe 77'	Stadium: Oakwell; Attendance: 11,290; Referee: Anthony Bates

10 April 2010	Peterborough United	1–2	Leicester City	Peterborough
15:00 BST	Rowe (yellow card) 8' (goal) 63'	Report	Howard 40'; King 66'	Stadium: London Road Stadium; Attendance: 9,651; Referee: Graham Scott

17 April 2010	Reading	6–0	Peterborough United	Reading
15:00 BST	Pearce 3'; Sigurðsson (yellow card) 20' (goal) 24' (pen.), 76'; McAnuff 29'; Kebe 44'; Long 59'	Report		Stadium: Madejski Stadium; Attendance: 15,982; Referee: Carl Boyeson

24 April 2010	Peterborough United	0–1	Blackpool	Peterborough
15:00 BST	Dickinson (yellow card) 81'	Report	Campbell 11'	Stadium: London Road Stadium; Attendance: 7,812; Referee: Colin Webster

2 May 2010	Plymouth Argyle	1–2	Peterborough United	Plymouth
15:00 BST	Wright-Phillips 31'	Report	Koranteng (yellow card) 36'; Andrew (yellow card) 39'; Lee (yellow card) 48'; Mackail-Smith 63', 69'	Stadium: Home Park; Attendance: 8,557; Referee: Steve Tanner

=== FA Cup ===
2 January 2010 Third round	Tottenham Hotspur	4–0	Peterborough United	Tottenham
15:00 GMT	Kranjčar 35', 57'; Defoe 70'; Rose (yellow card) 87'; Keane 90+5' (pen.)	Report	Boyd (yellow card) 42'; Lee (yellow card) 45+1'	Stadium: White Hart Lane; Attendance: 35,862; Referee: Lee Mason

=== League Cup ===
11 August 2009 First round	Wycombe Wanderers	0–4	Peterborough United	High Wycombe
19:45 GMT		Report	McLean 24'; Rowe 33'; Boyd 59'; Frecklington 68'	Stadium: Adams Park; Attendance: 2,078; Referee: Trevor Kettle

25 August 2009 Second round	Peterborough United	2–1	Ipswich Town	Peterborough
19:45 GMT	Frecklington 32'; Rowe (yellow card) 49'; Boyd 64'; Batt (yellow card) 69'	Report	Balkestein (yellow card) 7'; Priskin 14'; Bruce (yellow card) 23'	Stadium: London Road Stadium; Attendance: 5,451; Referee: Rob Shoebridge

22 September 2009 Third round	Peterborough United	2–0	Newcastle United	Peterborough
19:45 GMT	Mackail-Smith 20'; Williams 31'; Diagouraga (yellow card) 38'; Boyd (yellow card) 74'	Report	Krul (yellow card) 34'; Guthrie (yellow card) 35' (red card) 55'; S. Taylor (yellow card) 41'; R. Taylor (yellow card) 68'	Stadium: London Road Stadium; Attendance: 10,298; Referee: Keith Stroud

27 October 2009 Fourth round	Blackburn Rovers	5–2	Peterborough United	Blackburn
19:45 GMT	Pedersen 4'; Givet (yellow card) 27'; Reid 45' (pen.); Salgado 57'; McCarthy 72'; Kalinić 74' (pen.)	Report	Whelpdale 17'; Lewis (red card) 43'; Boyd 50'	Stadium: Ewood Park; Attendance: 8,419; Referee: Anthony Taylor
