= Charlie Lee (English footballer) =

English association football player (born 1987)

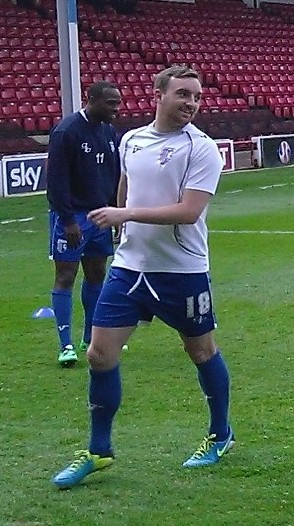
- Lee (right) warming up for Gillingham in 2014

Personal information
- Full name: Charlie Lee
- Date of birth: 5 January 1987 (age 39)
- Place of birth: Whitechapel, England
- Height: 5 ft 9 in (1.75 m)
- Positions: Defender; midfielder

Team information
- Current team: Leyton Orient (Academy coach)

Youth career
- Wormley Rovers
- 2003–2005: Tottenham Hotspur

Senior career*
Years	Team	Apps	(Gls)
2005–2007	Tottenham Hotspur	0	(0)
2006–2007	→ Millwall (loan)	5	(0)
2007–2011	Peterborough United	153	(14)
2010	→ Gillingham (loan)	4	(1)
2011–2014	Gillingham	96	(10)
2014–2017	Stevenage	118	(14)
2017–2019	Leyton Orient	43	(3)
2019–2021	Yeovil Town	62	(5)
2021	Billericay Town	13	(1)
Total		495	(48)

Managerial career
- 2022: Yeovil Town (caretaker)
- * Club domestic league appearances and goals

Charlie Lee (born 5 January 1987) is an English professional football coach and former player, who played as a defender or midfielder. He is an academy coach at EFL League Two club Leyton Orient. He is currently the Interim Head Coach of Magic United in the NPL Queensland, Australia.

== Playing career ==
=== Tottenham Hotspur ===
Born in Whitechapel, London, Lee was a youth player with Wormley Rovers before starting his career in the Tottenham Hotspur youth system in 2003. He signed a professional contract with the club in July 2005. He appeared on the first team bench for the first time in the UEFA Cup tie against Slavia Prague on 28 September 2006 and also appeared as an unused substitute against Sporting Braga, a match which Tottenham won 3–2. Lee was also an unused sub for a handful of top flight fixtures.

On 18 November, Lee played his first game for Millwall in their 2–2 draw with Doncaster Rovers, filling in for the injured Richard Shaw.

He was released from his contract by Tottenham on 19 May 2007.

=== Peterborough United ===
Lee completed a move to Peterborough United on 23 May, signing a three-year contract. He has played the majority of his games for them in centre midfield, scoring eight goals in the 2007–08 season and was named the club's player of the year.

Lee signed a new four-year contract with Peterborough in July 2008. In the 2008–09 season, Lee played the majority of the time anywhere along the back four. On 25 April, he scored the only goal in the 1–0 win against Colchester United which paired with the 1–0 defeat of Milton Keynes Dons by Walsall at the stadium:mk promoted the club to the Championship. He won the club's player of the year award for the second successive year.

=== Gillingham ===
He re-joined Gillingham, on a three-year contract, in July 2011. He was released by the club at the end of the 2013–14 season.

=== Stevenage ===
Lee signed for newly relegated League Two club Stevenage on 12 July 2014.

=== Yeovil Town ===
Following promotion with Leyton Orient to League Two, Lee was released at the end of the 2018–19 season. He signed for Yeovil Town on 13 August 2019 as a free transfer, on a one-year contract. At the end of the 2020–21 season, Lee left Yeovil Town following the expiry of his contract.

=== Billericay Town ===
After expressing a desire to move closer to home, Lee signed for National League South side Billericay Town ahead of the 2021–22 season.

Lee announced his retirement from playing, due to recurring injury, on 3 December 2021.

== Coaching career ==
=== Yeovil Town ===
On 17 February 2022, Lee returned to National League side Yeovil Town as assistant manager, signing a short-term contract the move reunited Lee with his former manager Darren Sarll. On 28 March 2022, after manager Darren Sarll left Yeovil for Woking, Lee was installed as Yeovil's caretaker manager. On 13 May 2022, Lee left the club with a game of the National League season remaining.

== Career statistics ==
=== Player ===
Appearances and goals by club, season and competition
Club	Season	League			FA Cup		League Cup		Other		Total	
Club	Season	Division	Apps	Goals	Apps	Goals	Apps	Goals	Apps	Goals	Apps	Goals
Tottenham Hotspur	2006–07	Premier League	0	0	0	0	0	0	0	0	0	0
Millwall (loan)	2006–07	League One	5	0	—		—		1 (Note: Appearance(s) in Football League Trophy)	0	6	0
Peterborough United	2007–08	League Two	42	6	4	1	2	0	2	1	50	8
Peterborough United	2008–09	League One	44	5	4	0	1	0	1	0	50	5
Peterborough United	2009–10	Championship	33	2	1	0	3	0	—		37	2
Peterborough United	2010–11	League One	34	1	0	0	3	0	3 (Note: One appearance in Football League Trophy, two in League One play-offs)	0	40	1
Peterborough United	Total		153	14	9	1	9	0	6	1	177	16
Gillingham (loan)	2010–11	League Two	4	1	—		—		—		4	1
Gillingham	2011–12	League Two	34	6	4	0	1	0	0	0	39	6
Gillingham	2012–13	League Two	31	2	2	0	2	0	0	0	35	2
Gillingham	2013–14	League One	31	2	2	0	0	0	0	0	33	2
Gillingham	Total		100	11	8	0	3	0	0	0	111	11
Stevenage	2014–15	League Two	44	9	2	0	1	0	3 (Note: One appearance in Football League Trophy, two in League Two play-offs)	0	50	9
Stevenage	2015–16	League Two	30	3	1	0	1	0	0	0	32	3
Stevenage	2016–17	League Two	44	2	1	0	2	0	1 (Note: Appearance in EFL Trophy)	0	48	2
Stevenage	Total		118	14	4	0	4	0	4	0	130	14
Leyton Orient	2017–18	National League	8	1	0	0	—		0	0	8	1
Leyton Orient	2018–19	National League	35	2	1	0	—		2 (Note: Appearances in FA Trophy)	0	38	2
Leyton Orient	Total		43	3	1	0	—		2	0	46	3
Yeovil Town	2019–20	National League	32	2	2	0	—		2 (Note: One appearance in FA Trophy, one appearance in National League play-offs)	0	36	2
Yeovil Town	2020–21	National League	30	3	3	0	—		0	0	33	3
Yeovil Town	Total		62	5	5	0	—		2	0	69	5
Billericay Town	2021–22	National League South	13	1	1	0	—		0	0	14	1
Career total			495	48	28	1	16	0	15	1	554	51

=== Managerial ===
As of match played 10 May 2022

Managerial record by team and tenure
Team	From	To	Record					Ref.
Team	From	To	P	W	D	L	Win %	Ref.
Yeovil Town (caretaker)	28 March 2022	13 May 2022	10	3	5	2	30.0	
Total			10	3	5	2	30.0	—

== Honours ==
=== Player ===
Peterborough United

- Football League Two runner-up: 2007–08
- Football League One runner-up: 2008–09
- Football League One play-offs: 2011

Gillingham

- Football League Two: 2012–13

Leyton Orient

- National League: 2018–19
- FA Trophy runner-up: 2018–19

=== Manager ===
Yeovil Town

- Somerset Premier Cup: 2021–22
