= Dominic Green (footballer) =

English footballer (born 1989)

Personal information
- Full name: Dominic Ashley Green
- Date of birth: 5 July 1989 (age 37)
- Place of birth: West Ham, England
- Height: 5 ft 7 in (1.70 m)
- Position: Midfielder

Team information
- Current team: Chatham Town

Youth career
- –2007: West Ham United

Senior career*
Years	Team	Apps	(Gls)
2007–2008	Dagenham & Redbridge	14	(1)
2007	→ Thurrock (loan)	7	(1)
2008–2011	Peterborough United	27	(2)
2010	→ Chesterfield (loan)	10	(2)
2010	→ Rushden & Diamonds (loan)	9	(0)
2011	→ St Neots Town (loan)	5	(2)
2011–2013	Dagenham & Redbridge	26	(1)
2013	→ Dartford (loan)	3	(0)
2013–2014	Ebbsfleet United	8	(0)
2013–2014	→ Tonbridge Angels (loan)	2	(0)
2014	→ Whitehawk (loan)	12	(2)
2015	Hayes & Yeading United	8	(0)
2016–2017	Bishop's Stortford	18	(0)
2019	East Thurrock	7	(0)
2019	Hornchurch	7	(0)
2020	Barking	4	(0)
2023–	Chatham Town	0	(0)
- * Club domestic league appearances and goals as of 21:57, 21 January 2020 (UTC)

Dominic Ashley Green (born 5 July 1989 in Newham, London) is an English footballer who plays for Chatham Town.

== Career ==
Green signed for Peterborough United from Dagenham & Redbridge for an undisclosed fee on 27 August 2008. He signed for Rushden & Diamonds on a month's loan on 16 August 2010. In March 2011, he joined United Counties league side St Neots Town on loan. Green was released by Peterborough United on 28 June 2011. On 1 September, Green signed for Dagenham & Redbridge on a free transfer. In January 2013, he joined Football Conference side Dartford on a one-month loan deal. On 7 May 2013, he was released by the Daggers due to the expiry of his contract. In August 2013, Green joined Conference South side Ebbsfleet United after impressing during pre-season.

After a short spell with East Thurrock, Green joined Hornchurch in October 2019.

On 3 October 2020, Green signed for Barking.

After 3 years away from football, Green signed for Chatham Town in July 2023.

== Career statistics ==
As of match played 25 April 2015.

Appearances and goals by club, season and competition
Club	Season	League			FA Cup		League Cup		Other		Total	
Club	Season	Division	Apps	Goals	Apps	Goals	Apps	Goals	Apps	Goals	Apps	Goals
Dagenham & Redbridge	2007–08	League Two	12	0	0	0	0	0	0	0	12	0
Dagenham & Redbridge	2008–09	League Two	2	1	—		1	0	—		3	1
Dagenham & Redbridge	Total		14	1	0	0	1	0	0	0	15	1
Thurrock (loan)	2007–08	Conference South	7	1	—		—		—		7	1
Peterborough United	2008–09	League One	16	1	2	0	—		1 (Note: Appearances in Football League Trophy)	0	19	1
Peterborough United	2009–10	Championship	11	1	1	0	0	0	—		12	1
Peterborough United	Total		27	2	3	0	0	0	1	0	31	2
Chesterfield (loan)	2009–10	League Two	10	2	—		—		—		10	2
Rushden & Diamonds (loan)	2010–11	Conference Premier	9	0	0	0	—		—		9	0
St Neots Town (loan)	2010–11	UCL Premier Division	5	2	—		—		—		5	2
Dagenham & Redbridge	2011–12	League Two	16	1	4	0	—		0	0	20	1
Dagenham & Redbridge	2012–13	League Two	10	0	0	0	0	0	2	0	12	0
Dagenham & Redbridge	Total		26	1	4	0	0	0	2	0	32	1
Dartford (loan)	2012–13	Conference Premier	3	0	—		—		2 (Note: Appearances in FA Trophy)	2	5	2
Ebbsfleet United	2013–14	Conference South	8	0	1	0	—		0	0	9	0
Tonbridge Angels (loan)	2013–14	Conference South	2	0	—		—		—		2	0
Whitehawk (loan)	2013–14	Conference South	12	2	—		—		—		12	2
Hayes & Yeading United	2014–15	Conference South	8	0	—		—		—		8	0
Career totals			131	11	8	0	1	0	5	2	145	13
