= Craig Morgan (footballer) =

Welsh footballer (born 1985)

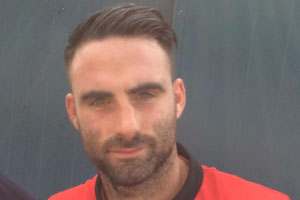
- Morgan in 2014

Personal information
- Full name: Craig Morgan
- Date of birth: 16 June 1985 (age 41)
- Place of birth: Flint, Wales
- Height: 6 ft 2 in (1.88 m)
- Position: Defender

Senior career*
Years	Team	Apps	(Gls)
2002–2005	Wrexham	52	(1)
2005–2007	Milton Keynes Dons	43	(0)
2006	→ Wrexham (loan)	1	(0)
2006–2007	→ Peterborough United (loan)	6	(0)
2007–2010	Peterborough United	119	(4)
2010–2012	Preston North End	50	(3)
2012–2015	Rotherham United	91	(1)
2015–2018	Wigan Athletic	56	(2)
2018–2019	Fleetwood Town	23	(0)

International career^{‡}
2001–2003	Wales U17	6	(0)
2002–2003	Wales U19	3	(0)
2003–2006	Wales U21	12	(0)
2006–2011	Wales	23	(0)
- * Club domestic league appearances and goals as of 12:41, 2 July 2019 (UTC) ‡ National team caps and goals as of 23:26, 28 May 2011 (UTC)

Craig Morgan (born 16 June 1985 in Flint) is a Welsh international footballer who plays as a central defender.

After beginning his career with spells at Wrexham, where he helped win the Football League Trophy in 2005, and Milton Keynes Dons, he joined Peterborough United in January 2007 after a short loan spell, helping the club reach the Football League Championship by winning consecutive promotions in the 2007–08 and 2008–09 seasons. He also achieved back to back promotions with Rotherham United.

== Club career ==
=== Wrexham ===
Morgan began his career as a youth player at Wrexham, making his professional debut at the end of the 2001–02 as a substitute during a 5–0 win over Cambridge United at the age of 16, a game which confirmed Wrexham's relegation to Division Three, and was handed a second substitute appearance the following week in a 1–0 defeat to Stoke City. Shortly after, Morgan soon handed his first professional contract. Morgan remained a bit part player the following season, although he did score his first professional goal during his first appearance of the season on 5 October 2002 in a 2–2 draw with Cambridge United, making seven appearances in all competitions as Wrexham gained promotion back into Division Two at the first attempt.

The 2003–04 season saw Morgan begin to establish himself in the Wrexham first team, making 21 appearances in all competitions as the club mostly stayed clear of a relegation battle with a 13th-placed finish. During the latter part of the season, Morgan was sent off for the first time in his professional career, in a 0–0 draw with Plymouth Argyle on 27 March 2004. The following season saw him make his most appearances in a single season for Wrexham, including playing in all six of the team's matches as they won the Football League Trophy, beating Southend United 2–0 in the final at the Millennium Stadium. He also scored his second and final goal for the club in a League Cup tie against Sheffield United. However the season ended in disappointment for the team as they were relegated back into Division Three after being docked ten points due to entering administration. At the end of 2003–04 season, Morgan signed a new contract

=== Milton Keynes Dons ===
Following relegation, Morgan, who was out of contract with the club, entered into talks over a new contract but rejected the first offer made by Wrexham stating: "Wrexham have been a great club for me, I understand their financial problems, but I'm not happy with my offer." Two weeks later Morgan's departure from Wrexham was confirmed, signing a two-year contract with League One side Milton Keynes Dons, who had previously been warned by Wrexham boss Denis Smith over their attempts to sign him, for an undisclosed five-figure transfer fee.

He made his debut for his new club on 6 August 2005, the opening day of the 2005–06 season, in a 2–2 draw with AFC Bournemouth, and appeared in 47 during the season which ended in relegation from Division Two. After starting the next season in the first-team, Morgan fell out of favour and was allowed to return to his first club Wrexham on a one-month loan deal, one week after making his debut for Wales, becoming the first Milton Keynes Dons player to win an international cap since the team's relocation. He made two appearances during his loan spell before returning to the National Hockey Stadium where he did not make another appearance before being sent out on loan again on 23 November 2006, this time to Peterborough United, until January 2007.

=== Peterborough United ===
He made his debut for The Posh on 2 December 2006 in a 2–1 win over Tranmere Rovers in the second round of the FA Cup as an 85th-minute substitute for Shane Huke. After impressing during his initial loan spell, having made seven appearances, his move was made permanent on 2 January on a free transfer. He quickly established himself in the first team and scored his first goal for the club in a 2–0 victory over Notts County on 3 March 2007.

In the 2007–08 season he made 41 league appearances, as well as signing a new three-year contract in February 2008, as the club won promotion to League One by finishing as runners-up to Milton Keynes Dons. Ahead of the club's League One campaign in the 2008–09 season, Morgan was handed the captaincy of the team at the age of just 23, taking over from Micah Hyde. However, on 29 September he was replaced as captain by Russell Martin, less than two months later. Peterborough Manager Darren Ferguson put the decision down to Morgan's involvement with the Wales national football team, which often saw him miss while on international duty, stating: "Craig did fine, it's nothing about that, he was just missing games." Despite losing the captaincy, he remained a regular first-team player and helped the side to their second consecutive promotion after forming a defensive partnership with Gabriel Zakuani, finishing as runners-up to Leicester City and reaching the Football League Championship. During the summer break after the 2008–09 season, Morgan became Peterborough's all-time record international appearance maker by winning his 14th cap for Wales in a friendly against Estonia. In December 2009, Morgan revealed he nearly joined Notts County loan deadline window, but it fell through at the last minute.

=== Preston North End ===
On 6 July 2010, Morgan joined Preston North End for a fee in the region of £400,000, where he was joined by former Peterborough manager Darren Ferguson. On the opening day of the season, Morgan made his debut in a 2–0 loss against Doncaster Rovers. Under Ferguson, Morgan established himself in the first team, though placing unused substitute in the matches. On 19 October 2010, Morgan scored his first goal in a 3–2 loss against Scunthorpe United; several weeks later, he scored again in a 2–1 loss against Barnsley. Soon after, Ferguson was sacked after straight losses and Phil Brown succeeded him. Toward the end of the season, the club was relegated to League One, finishing in the bottom three.

In his second season, with Preston now in League One, Morgan made several mistakes in the early start of the season, leading Brown to drop him out of the squad for three months. On his return in a 5–2 loss against Charlton, Morgan scored his first goal. After being sent off over professional foul in a 2–1 loss against Yeovil Town on 28 January 2012, Morgan was partly used due to injury and then falling out of favour by newly manager Graham Westley. Two months later on 31 March 2012, Morgan made his return in a 2–0 loss against Sheffield Wednesday and would be in the squad for the rest of the season.

Ahead of a new season, Morgan suffered a hernia injury, ruling him out for three weeks. Morgan is soon making his way out at Preston, having deemed surplus to requirements. Manager Westley described his departure as "bizarre". His contract was terminated by mutual consent on 31 August 2012 (the transfer deadline).

=== Rotherham United ===
Shortly after being released by Preston, Morgan joined Rotherham United on a free transfer.

Five days later, Morgan made his debut, coming on as a substitute, in a 6–2 loss against Port Vale. Since arriving at Rotherham United, Morgan established himself in the first team and was linked with League One side Coventry City and League Two side Fleetwood Town and Chesterfield. But the transfer speculation ended when Morgan signed an 18-month extended contract Having signed a new contract, Morgan suffered a foot injury during a match against Wycombe, that was set to leave him on the sidelines post-Christmas. He scored his first goal for the club in the Millers 4–1 home win over Exeter City on 9 April 2013. That season, Rotherham went on to be promoted from League Two.

The following season, Morgan become Rotherham United captain following the departure of Johnny Mullins at the start of the season and continued to be a first team regular, playing as a centre-back until he suffered injuries during the middle of the season. Morgan then returned his return to the first team on 1 March 2014, playing 90 minutes in a 6–0 win over Notts County and continued to remain in the first team throughout the season. Morgan captained Rotherham to a win at Wembley Stadium over Leyton Orient that saw them promoted to the Championship. During the season, Morgan praised the club's determination resilience.

In the 2014–15 season, Morgan continued to captain the side in the Championship as they secured their safety for another season. After the 2–0 home against Reading that secured safety, Morgan said he was happy and settled at the club and wished to stay. However, on 22 May 2015, Morgan, along with fellow player Ben Pringle, rejected new contracts at the club and would be released when their contracts expired on 1 July 2015.

=== Wigan Athletic ===
On 12 June 2015, Craig Morgan joined League One side Wigan Athletic on a free transfer on a two-year contract. Upon joining the club, Morgan was given number twenty shirt. and was appointed as the new captain of Wigan.

Morgan made his Wigan Athletic debut in the opening game of the season, in a 2–0 loss against Coventry City. He scored his first goal for Wigan in a 2–2 draw with Bury on 10 October 2015. On 7 January 2016, Morgan scored the winner in the 96th minute, capping off a remarkable 3–2 win for Wigan over Gillingham. In March 2017 Morgan signed a new two-year deal at the club extending his stay until summer 2019.

=== Fleetwood Town ===
Morgan joined Fleetwood Town in July 2018. He left Fleetwood on 2 September 2019.

== International career ==
Morgan made his debut for the Wales under-17 side on 24 September 2001 in a 2–0 friendly win over Scotland, going on to win 6 caps for the side before moving up to under-19 and under-21 levels.

He made his debut for the Wales senior side on 11 October 2006 in a 3–1 win over Cyprus at the Millennium Stadium during the qualifying campaign for Euro 2008.

== Career statistics ==
As of match played 26 January 2019

Appearances and goals by club, season and competition
Club	Season	League			FA Cup		League Cup		Other		Total	
Club	Season	Division	Apps	Goals	Apps	Goals	Apps	Goals	Apps	Goals	Apps	Goals
Wrexham	2001–02	Second Division	2	0	0	0	0	0	0	0	2	0
Wrexham	2002–03	Third Division	6	1	0	0	0	0	2 (Note: One appearance in Football League Trophy; one appearance in FAW Premier Cup)	0	8	1
Wrexham	2003–04	Second Division	18	0	1	0	0	0	4 (Note: Two appearances in Football League Trophy; two appearances in FAW Premier Cup)	0	23	0
Wrexham	2004–05	League One	26	0	1	0	1	1	9 (Note: Six appearances in Football League Trophy; three appearances in FAW Premier Cup)	0	37	1
Wrexham	Total		52	1	2	0	1	1	15	0	70	2
Milton Keynes Dons	2005–06	League One	40	0	4	0	1	0	2 (Note: Appearance(s) in Football League Trophy)	0	47	0
Milton Keynes Dons	2006–07	League Two	3	0	0	0	1	0	0	0	4	0
Milton Keynes Dons	Total		43	0	4	0	2	0	2	0	51	0
Wrexham (loan)	2006–07	League Two	1	0	0	0	0	0	1	0	2	0
Peterborough United (loan)	2006–07	League Two	6	0	1	0	0	0	0	0	7	0
Peterborough United	2006–07	League Two	17	1	2	0	0	0	0	0	19	1
Peterborough United	2007–08	League Two	41	2	4	0	1	0	0	0	46	2
Peterborough United	2008–09	League One	27	0	5	0	1	0	1	0	34	0
Peterborough United	2009–10	Championship	34	1	1	0	3	0	—		38	1
Peterborough United	Total		125	4	13	0	5	0	1	0	144	4
Preston North End	2010–11	Championship	31	2	1	0	1	0	—		33	2
Preston North End	2011–12	League One	19	1	2	0	2	0	2	0	25	1
Preston North End	Total		50	3	3	0	3	0	2	0	58	3
Rotherham United	2012–13	League Two	21	1	1	0	0	0	0	0	22	1
Rotherham United	2013–14	League One	35	0	2	0	2	0	6 (Note: Three appearances in Football League Trophy; three appearances in League One play-offs)	0	45	0
Rotherham United	2014–15	Championship	35	0	1	0	2	0	—		38	0
Rotherham United	Total		91	1	4	0	4	0	6	0	105	1
Wigan Athletic	2015–16	League One	36	2	1	0	1	0	0	0	38	2
Wigan Athletic	2016–17	Championship	20	0	0	0	0	0	—		20	0
Wigan Athletic	2017–18	League One	0	0	0	0	0	0	0	0	0	0
Wigan Athletic	Total		56	2	1	0	1	0	0	0	58	2
Fleetwood Town	2018–19	League One	23	0	2	0	0	0	1	0	26	0
Career total			441	11	29	0	16	1	28	0	514	12

== Honours ==
Wrexham

- Football League Trophy: 2004–05

Peterborough United

- Football League One second-place promotion: 2008–09
- Football League Two second-place promotion: 2007–08

Rotherham United

- Football League One play-offs: 2014
- Football League Two runner-up: 2012–13

Wigan Athletic

- Football League One: 2015–16

Individual

- The Football League Team of the Season: 2015–16
- PFA Team of the Year: 2015–16 League One
