= Aaron McLean =

English footballer (born 1983)

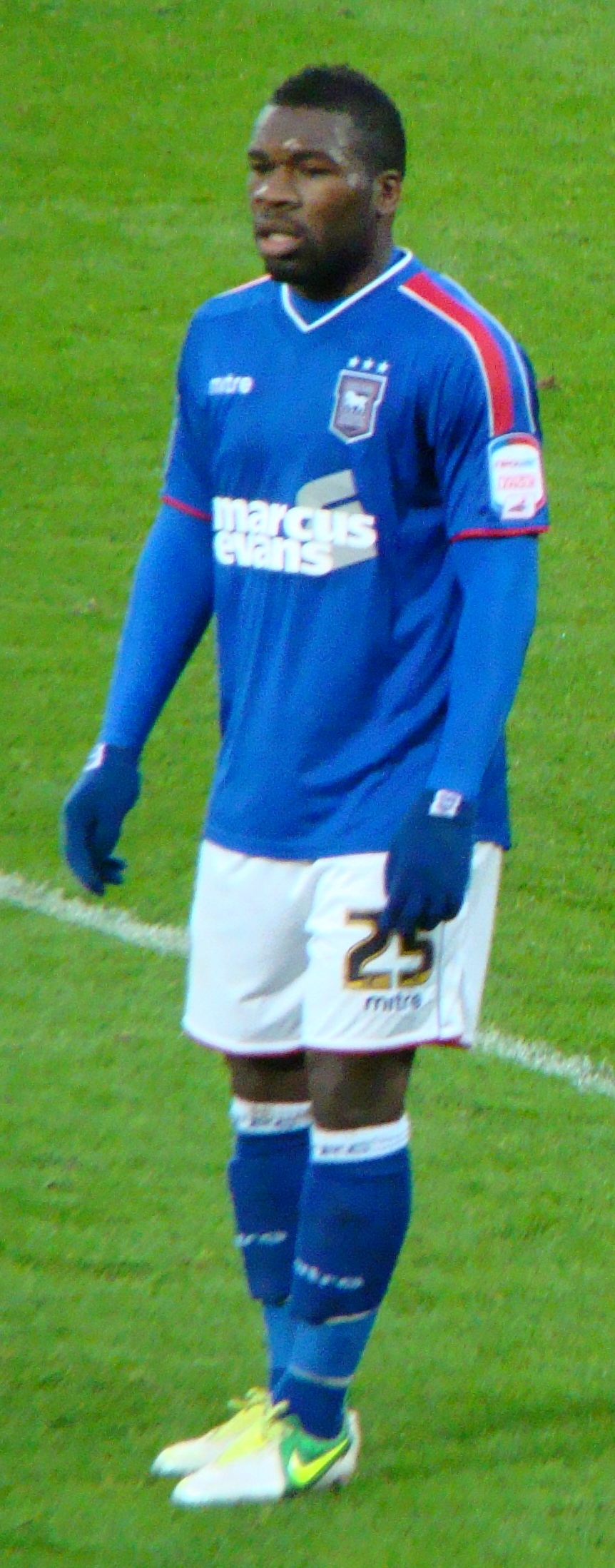
- Playing for Ipswich Town in 2013

Personal information
- Full name: Aaron McLean
- Date of birth: 25 May 1983 (age 43)
- Place of birth: Hammersmith, England
- Height: 5 ft 7 in (1.70 m)
- Position: Striker

Youth career
- 1998–1999: Leyton Orient

Senior career*
Years	Team	Apps	(Gls)
1999–2003	Leyton Orient	40	(2)
2002	→ Grays Athletic (loan)	6	(3)
2003–2005	Aldershot Town	72	(12)
2005–2007	Grays Athletic	57	(25)
2006–2007	→ Peterborough United (loan)	9	(4)
2007–2011	Peterborough United	148	(67)
2011–2014	Hull City	77	(9)
2013	→ Ipswich Town (loan)	7	(1)
2013–2014	→ Birmingham City (loan)	7	(0)
2014–2015	Bradford City	33	(6)
2014–2015	→ Peterborough United (loan)	18	(1)
2015–2016	Barnet	20	(5)
2016–2018	Ebbsfleet United	35	(9)
Total		529	(144)

International career
2003–2006	England C	5	(0)
- * Club domestic league appearances and goals

Aaron McLean (born 25 May 1983) is an English retired professional footballer who played as a striker. At international level he gained five caps for the England C team during his time in non-league.

McLean began his senior career with Leyton Orient in 1999, having graduated from the club's youth ranks. Never really breaking into the first team, he made 40 league appearances in a four-year spell, which also included a brief loan to Grays Athletic. He switched to Aldershot Town in 2003, and, after making 68 league appearances, moved again to Grays Athletic in 2005. He quickly became a regular player for Grays, making 59 league appearances before switching to Peterborough United in 2006; initially on loan, which became permanent the following year. He was a regular for Peterborough, and made 148 league appearances before moving to Hull City in January 2011. Initially a regular player for Hull, he fell out of favour following the club's promotion to the Premier League, and moved on loan to Ipswich Town and then Birmingham City in 2013. In January 2014 McLean completed a move to Bradford City.

== Career ==
=== Early career ===
Born in Hammersmith, London, McLean attended Robert Clack School in Dagenham. He started his career with the Leyton Orient youth system in 1998. He then played for Aldershot Town.

He then played for Grays Athletic before joining League Two side Peterborough on loan, on 31 October 2006. McLean then joined Peterborough permanently, for £150,000, when the transfer window opened on 1 January 2007.

=== Peterborough United ===
==== 2006–07 ====
McLean was initially signed by Peterborough on loan from Grays Athletic, however was then signed permanently for £150,000 in the following January transfer window. During this period he made 20 appearances and scored 10 times in both the FA Cup and League Two.

==== 2007–08 ====
McLean had his best statistical year in Peterborough's 2007–08 campaign, which resulted in promotion to League One. McLean scored 29 goals in the league in 45 appearances that season, which made him the League's leading scorer and earned him the League Two Golden Boot. He also scored three goals in four FA Cup appearances that year.

==== 2008–09 ====
McLean signed a new four-year contract with Peterborough in July 2008. Following promotion to League One, Peterborough were off to a slow start, having won only one game and lost three, leaving them in 20th place in the league, and out of the relegation spots solely on goal difference. In this early period McLean had only one league goal to his name. However whilst Peterborough's luck changed for the better starting with a 5–4 win against Bristol Rovers in which McLean scored one of Peterborough's five goals, he suffered an elbow injury in the game and had to miss several of the following games. Following three substitute appearances, McLean was back in the starting line-up replacing Scott Rendell. McLean went on to start for the remainder of the season, which saw Peterborough secure second position in the league and with it promotion to the Championship. Despite suffering injury, McLean finished the season with a total of 18 league goals in 39 appearances and was Peterborough's highest scorer behind Craig Mackail-Smith.

==== 2009–10 ====
McLean had a written transfer request accepted by Peterborough in December 2009.

=== Hull City ===
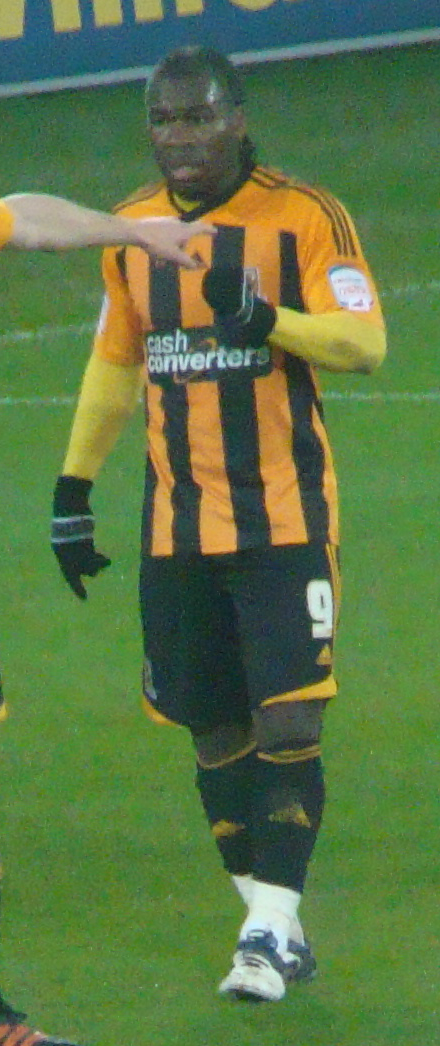
McLean playing for Hull City in 2012

==== 2010–11 ====
On 30 December 2010, it was confirmed on the official website that McLean would transfer to Hull City at the start of the January 2011 transfer window. He made his debut in the New Year's Day game with Leicester City coming on as a first-half substitute to replace Jamie Devitt. On 5 February 2011, in the Humber derby against Scunthorpe United, he got his first two goals for Hull.

==== 2011–12 ====
McLean scored his first goal of the 2011–12 season, on 10 September, against his old club, Peterborough United at London Road Stadium. On 22 October 2011 against Watford at the KC Stadium, Liam Rosenior's first low ball was blocked, but he made sure he got a second chance to cross and McLean was on hand to fire home his first goal at the KC Stadium. On 29 October 2011 against Nottingham Forest at the City Ground, a ball over the top sent Mclean racing away from his marker and he kept his cool to smash home a shot into the bottom corner from 10 yards. On 7 December 2011 against Birmingham City at the KC Stadium, a Birmingham attack was broken up and Corry Evans played the ball to Robert Koren in the centre circle. Koren waited patiently before sliding a perfect ball inside the Birmingham left back for McLean, who advanced to the edge of the box before beating Boaz Myhill with a low shot inside the near post.

==== 2012–13 ====
On 11 August 2012, McLean scored Hull's first competitive goal of the season against Rotherham United at the KC Stadium in the League Cup. In January 2013, he joined Ipswich Town on loan for the remainder of the season. Upon arrival McLean made negative remarks about Ipswich town centre, a reaction which disappointed the leader of the local council.

==== 2013–14 ====
He made his Premier League debut as a late substitute in a 1–0 loss to Tottenham Hotspur on 27 October 2013. McLean then joined Championship club Birmingham City on 21 November 2013, on loan until 1 January 2014. He made his debut two days later, as a second-half substitute as Birmingham drew with Blackpool, and then scored both goals as the club's development squad beat their Newcastle United counterparts in the U21 Premier League Cup. When it came to light that McLean had been ineligible, having played for his parent club in an earlier round, Birmingham withdrew from the competition. He made seven first-team appearances, mainly as a substitute, without scoring, before missing the last two games of his loan spell with a hamstring injury.

Upon his return to Hull he scored his first goal of the season against Middlesbrough in the FA Cup on 4 January 2014.

=== Bradford City ===
On 16 January 2014 McLean signed a two-and-a-half-year deal with League One club Bradford City for an undisclosed fee. He made his debut on 18 January in a 2–2 draw away at Sheffield United. On 18 November 2014, McLean rejoined Peterborough United on loan until January 2015. He was released by Bradford in June 2015.

=== Barnet ===
McLean joined Barnet on a short-term deal on 19 August 2015. He played 22 times for the Bees in all competitions, scoring five goals, before leaving the club on 14 January 2016.

=== Ebbsfleet United ===
McLean joined Ebbsfleet United on a free transfer on 14 January 2016. He became striker coach at the club for the 2017–18 season and retired from playing at the end of the season.

=== Coaching career ===
After leaving his coaching role at Ebbsfleet, McLean became first team coach at Peterborough in May 2019, signing a three-year contract. He left the club a year later.

== Personal life ==
He is the younger brother of British singer McLean, and nephew of Bitty McLean.

== Career statistics ==
As of match played 16 January 2018

Appearances and goals by club, season and competition
Club	Season	League			FA Cup		League Cup		Other		Total	
Club	Season	Division	Apps	Goals	Apps	Goals	Apps	Goals	Apps	Goals	Apps	Goals
Leyton Orient	1999–2000	Division Three	3	0	0	0	0	0	1 (Note: Appearance(s) in Football League Trophy)	0	4	0
Leyton Orient	2000–01	Division Three	2	1	0	0	0	0	0	0	2	1
Leyton Orient	2001–02	Division Three	27	1	3	0	0	0	1	1	31	2
Leyton Orient	2002–03	Division Three	8	0	0	0	0	0	0	0	8	0
Leyton Orient	Total		40	2	3	0	0	0	2	1	45	3
Grays Athletic (loan)	2002–03	Isthmian League Premier	6	3	0	0	—		0	0	6	3
Aldershot Town	2002–03	Isthmian League Premier	10	4	0	0	—		1 (Note: Appearance(s) in Hampshire Senior Cup)	2	11	6
Aldershot Town	2003–04	Conference Premier	37	6	2	1	—		12 (Note: Three appearances one goal in Conference play-offs, seven appearances two goals in FA Trophy, two appearances two goals in Hampshire Senior Cup. Soccerbase omit three Conference appearances and the early rounds of the FA Trophy.)	5	51	12
Aldershot Town	2004–05	Conference Premier	25	2	2	2	—		5 (Note: One appearance in FA Trophy, one in Football League Trophy, and three appearances four goals in Hampshire Senior Cup. Soccerbase omit one Conference appearance and the early rounds of the FA Trophy.)	4	32	8
Aldershot Town	Total		72	12	4	3	—		18	11	94	26
Grays Athletic	2004–05	Conference South	10	2	0	0	—		0	0	10	2
Grays Athletic	2005–06	Conference Premier	30	10	3	1	—		11 (Note: Nine appearances two goals in FA Trophy, two appearances in Conference play-offs)	2	44	13
Grays Athletic	2006–07	Conference Premier	17	13	0	0	—		0	0	17	13
Grays Athletic	Total		57	25	3	1	—		11	2	71	28
Peterborough United (loan)	2006–07	League Two	9	4	2	1	0	0	1	0	12	5
Peterborough United	2006–07	League Two	7	3	2	2	0	0	0	0	9	5
Peterborough United	2007–08	League Two	45	29	4	3	2	0	2	1	53	33
Peterborough United	2008–09	League One	42	17	5	1	1	0	0	0	48	18
Peterborough United	2009–10	Championship	35	7	0	0	4	1	—		39	8
Peterborough United	2010–11	League One	19	10	3	2	3	1	1	1	26	14
Peterborough United	Total		157	70	16	9	10	2	4	2	187	83
Hull City	2010–11	Championship	23	3	0	0	0	0	—		23	3
Hull City	2011–12	Championship	39	5	2	1	0	0	—		41	6
Hull City	2012–13	Championship	14	1	0	0	2	2	—		16	3
Hull City	2013–14	Premier League	1	0	1	1	2	0	—		4	1
Hull City	Total		77	9	3	2	4	2	—		84	13
Ipswich Town (loan)	2012–13	Championship	7	1	1	0	0	0	—		8	1
Birmingham City (loan)	2013–14	Championship	7	0	0	0	0	0	—		7	0
Bradford City	2013–14	League One	20	4	0	0	0	0	0	0	20	4
Bradford City	2014–15	League One	13	2	0	0	3	1	1	0	17	3
Bradford City	Total		33	6	0	0	3	1	1	0	37	7
Peterborough United (loan)	2014–15	League One	18	1	1	0	0	0	—		19	1
Barnet	2015–16	League Two	20	5	0	0	1	0	1 (Note: One appearance in Football League Trophy, one appearance in Middlesex Senior Cup)	0	22	5
Ebbsfleet United	2015–16	National League South	15	5	0	0	—		0	0	15	5
Ebbsfleet United	2016–17	National League South	10	3	0	0	—		3 (Note: Appearances in National League South play-offs)	1	13	4
Ebbsfleet United	2017–18	National League	10	1	1	1	—		1 (Note: Appearance(s) in FA Trophy)	0	12	2
Ebbsfleet United	Total		35	9	1	1	0	0	4	1	40	11
Career total			529	143	32	16	18	5	41	17	620	181

== Honours ==
Individual

- PFA Team of the Year: 2007–08 Football League Two
- Football League One Player of the Month: February 2009
