= James McKeown =

Irish footballer

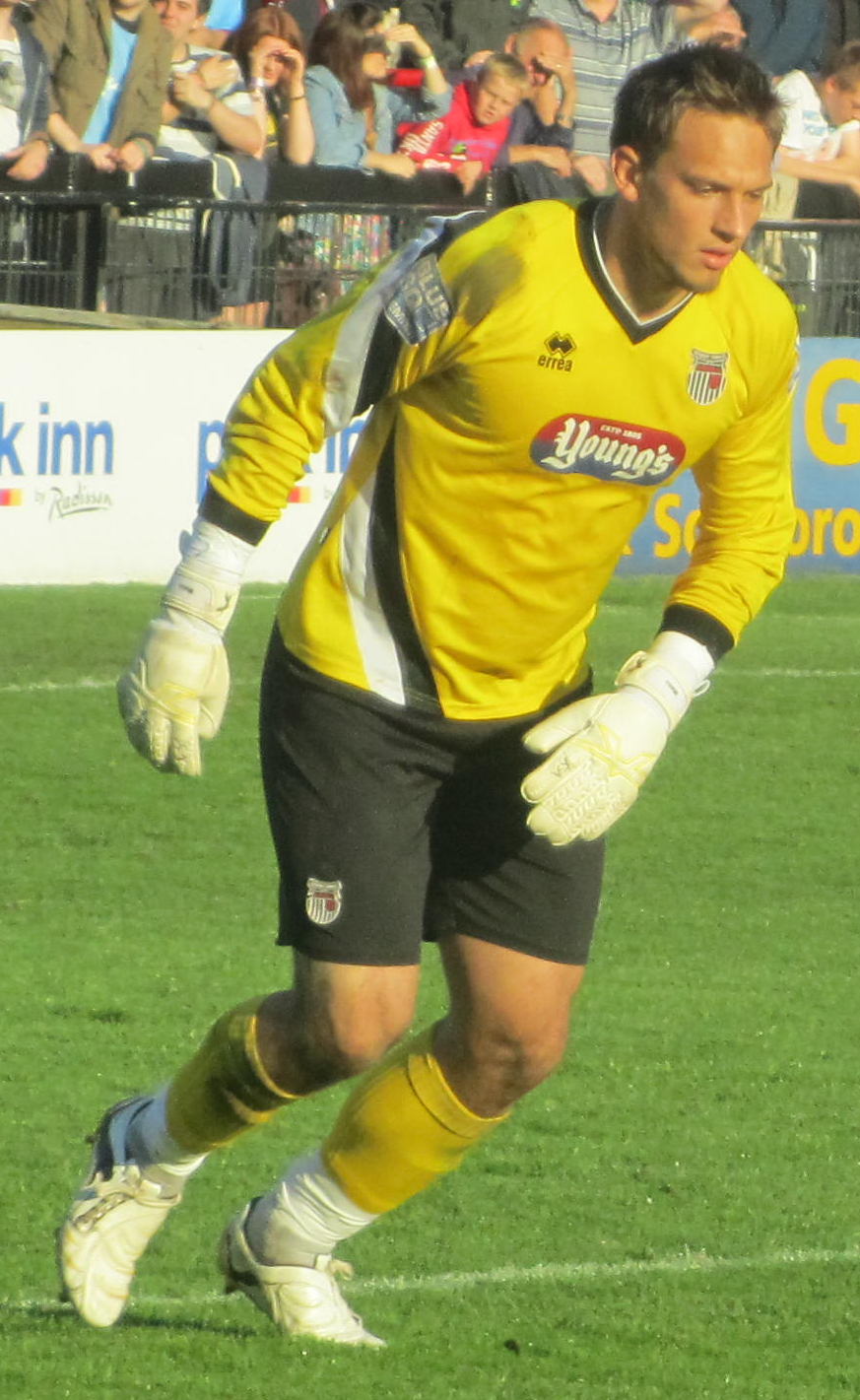
- McKeown playing for Grimsby Town in 2011

Personal information
- Full name: James Karl McKeown
- Date of birth: 24 July 1989 (age 37)
- Place of birth: Birmingham, England
- Height: 6 ft 2 in (1.87 m)
- Position: Goalkeeper

Team information
- Current team: Grimsby Borough (goalkeeping coach)

Youth career
- 1998–2000: Coventry City
- 2005–2007: Walsall

Senior career*
Years	Team	Apps	(Gls)
2007–2011	Peterborough United	6	(0)
2007	→ Kettering Town (loan)	2	(0)
2007	→ Worcester City (loan)	1	(0)
2010–2011	→ Boston United (loan)	17	(0)
2011	RKSV Leonidas	5	(0)
2011–2022	Grimsby Town	432	(0)
2022–2023	Finn Harps	12	(0)
2023–2024	Cleethorpes Town	17	(0)
Total		492	(0)

International career^{‡}
2007–2008	Republic of Ireland U19	2	(0)
- * Club domestic league appearances and goals as of 20:09, 7 June 2023 (UTC) ‡ National team caps and goals as of 07:43, 31 December 2020 (UTC)

James Karl McKeown (born 24 July 1989) is a former professional footballer and coach who played as a goalkeeper. He is the goalkeeping coach at Grimsby Borough.

Born in Birmingham, McKeown began his career aged 15 with Coventry City and Walsall youth teams, but was unable to establish himself and departed two years later. He then joined Peterborough United; he spent time on loan with Kettering Town and Worcester City in 2007 prior to breaking into the Peterborough first team in 2008, however, his appearances where limited during his time there. McKeown was then loaned to Conference North side Boston United during the 2010–11 season where he made a total of 14 clean sheets in 18 games.

A sixth-month stint at Dutch semi-professional outfit RKSV Leonidas had led to a trial with Eredivisie side Willem II, however, his previous managers at Boston signed him for Grimsby Town; he was ever present in the starting XI and five years on helped Grimsby to win promotion out of the National League in 2015–16 and 2021–22. He moved on to play for League of Ireland side Finn Harps before finishing his career with non-league side Cleethorpes Town. McKeown has represented the Republic of Ireland at under-19 level.

== Club career ==
McKeown started his career with Coventry City as an Under-10 striker in their youth system, he went on trial in goal and spent two years in their Under-11s before being released. He eventually moved on to Walsall in their Under-15s setup, but failed to make a first team appearances before his departure in 2007.

=== Peterborough United ===
McKeown was signed by Peterborough United. He joined Conference North team Kettering Town on loan in August 2007 and made just one game on loan for Worcester City in October, in a 5–0 defeat against Hucknall Town, after being brought in on a month's loan as cover for Danny McDonnell.

On 9 February 2008, McKeown made his first appearance for Peterborough United in League Two, coming on as a 76th-minute substitute for the injured Joe Lewis who was stretchered off following a nasty aerial collision. He signed a 2 1/2-year contract extension on 16 March 2009. The following season in League One he made one appearance on 2 May 2009 where he came off the bench in the 77th minute as Joe Lewis made way in the 2–2 draw with Swindon Town. He was sent out to train with Manchester United for a week in October 2009 to receive specialist coaching.

During his time at Peterborough United he gained back to back promotions in the 2007–08 and 2008–09 seasons with the posh although McKeown was to make just four appearances in the Championship. His last appearance for the Posh was in the final game of the season though despite a 1–0 defeat against Blackpool he was named man of the match, during the game his best save was leaping spectacularly to keep out DJ Campbell's sharp overhead kick at close range though he saw the same player spring from the ground to head in the rebound.

==== Loan to Boston United ====
McKeown joined Boston United in August 2010 on loan until January 2011. He played a key role in Boston's excellent start to the season with ten successive league clean sheets and had a total of 14 clean sheets in 18 games. On New Year's Day he played his last game and received a fantastic reception and farewell from the Boston United supporters. However, despite his remarkable record of clean sheets and fantastic form whilst on loan at Boston Peterborough United came to an agreement with James that he should seek pastures new. McKeown spent a week at Lincoln City on trial and a one-off appearance for Boston United in the FA Trophy due to their keeper Dan Haystead being cup tied, he then signed for Dutch Rotterdam based semi-professional side RKSV Leonidas in the Hoofdklasse league.

=== Grimsby Town ===
On 23 June 2011, Grimsby Town announced they were in discussions to sign McKeown, following the club's announcement to bring in a second choice keeper to challenge number one Kenny Arthur after Town had heavily relied upon goalkeeping coach Steve Croudson in the previous season. On 2 July 2011, he signed a one-year contract with Town. McKeown played in the final of the Lincolnshire Senior Cup on 3 August 2011, beating Lincoln City 4–3 to win the cup at Sincil Bank.

McKeown was initially brought to the club as a backup keeper to challenge Kenny Arthur, but following an impressive pre-season he became the club's first choice keeper. He made his league debut for Grimsby Town on 13 August 2011 in the 2–0 defeat against Fleetwood. A week later he saved what became a crucial penalty against Newport taken by Craig McAllister to earn his side a 0–0 draw. During the 2011–12 campaign he picked up three yellow cards, each for time wasting. McKeown was also ever-present during the 2011–12 season helping Grimsby Town produce 18 clean sheets in 55 games. On 24 April 2012, he picked up four awards for Player of the Year at the club's annual presentation. On 30 April 2012, he agreed to a new two-year contract with the club.

McKeown played in the final of the Lincolnshire Senior Cup on 31 July 2012. After the game finishing 1–1 at full-time, he saved a penalty inturn beating Lincoln City in a penalty shoot-out to win the cup at Sincil Bank for a second consecutive year.

McKeown retained the Supporters Player of the Season award when he scooped the prize again once more for his part during the 2013–14 season. A host of clubs were believed to be chasing his signature, however on 16 May 2014, he agreed a new two-year contract with the club.

On 16 August 2014, McKeown saved a crucial last-minute penalty, the game finishing 1–1, preventing Dover Athletic winning the game. He played in all the league games of the 2014–15 season as Grimsby came 3rd in the Conference, and secured a play-off spot. He also played in the 2015 Conference Premier play-off final against Bristol Rovers at Wembley on 17 May 2015; following a 1–1 draw after extra time, Grimsby lost 5–3 in a penalty shoot-out.

McKeown picked up the Reusch Goalkeeper of the Year 2014–15 award on 20 May 2015, at The Non-League Paper's National Game Awards in association with The NLFA, for keeping 23 clean sheets himself.

As training was in full swing for the 2015–16 season, McKeown was admitted to hospital on 18 July 2015 and diagnosed as suffering with viral meningitis. Four days later, he finished his treatment and was released from hospital. McKeown was able to return to light training by 24 July 2016. Having already secured a play-off spot in the last home game against Chester, McKeown missed only the last game of the 2015–16 season as Paul Hurst's "Mariners" came 4th in the National League. McKeown played in Grimsby's 3–1 victory over Forest Green Rovers in the 2016 National League play-off final at Wembley, seeing Grimsby promoted to League Two after a six-year absence from the Football League.

His efforts over the season earned him a place in the 2015–16 National League team of the year, alongside the league's outstanding players. McKeown signed a new two-year contract, that will keep him at the club until the summer of 2018.

McKeown made his League Two debut with the club on 6 August 2016 in the opening game of the 2016–17 season in Grimsby's 2–0 home victory against Morecambe. After losing the number 1 spot to Manchester United loanee Dean Henderson on 28 January 2017 McKeown confirmed he had handed in his transfer request.

McKeown made numerous saves in the final game of the 2016–17 season at home to League Two leaders Plymouth Argyle, which finished 1–1 and prevented them from becoming champions; the performance lead to McKeown being named in the English Football League Team of the Week for the month of May 2017.

You would have to say we deserved to win the game, apart from a world class display by their goalkeeper, we would have won.

— Neil Aspin in 2018.

On 26 December 2017, McKeown suffered an injury in the 33rd minute of the 1–1 stalemate against Mansfield Town and was replaced by Ben Killip. Scans revealed a ruptured groin and he would be missing for between six and eight weeks. McKeown made his comeback on 17 February 2018 in a 3–1 defeat at Cambridge United Grimsby were in relegation trouble when they came up against Port Vale at Blundell Park on 10 March 2018, McKeown saved a penalty by Michael Tonge and a one-handed stop from Anton Forrester ensuring the game finished in a 1–1 draw, Vale manager Neil Aspin hailed McKeown's performance as world class. McKeown won the Player of the Season for a third time in his career for his contribution in the 2017–18 season.

He signed a new three-year contract with Grimsby at the end of the 2017–18 season.

In the absence of Danny Collins through injury, McKeown was made team captain for his first time in his professional career on 22 December 2018 in a 4–0 win over Notts County.

Grimsby were relegated back to non-league football at the end of the 2020–21 season, McKeown apologised to the fans by stating "Sorry. Sorry for what we've produced this year as a football club and as individuals, It's horrific, and it's not just one night. The hope's been there because we won on Saturday, and you always believe while you still can. To a degree, tonight's irrelevant, that's not why we've gone down. There's obviously lots involved in the game, but we've got it wrong as players, as individuals, myself, as a club, we've got it wrong probably from the minute we came back this year, maybe even the last couple of years being that team floating down the bottom. I can only apologise to the fans and my family because we've let everyone down".

On 24 July 2021, McKeown was awarded a testimonial match in a game played against Rotherham United.

During the 2021–22 campaign, McKeown lost his regular place in the team to Max Crocombe, with the club ending up returning to the Football League at the first time of asking.

On 11 June 2022, the club announced their retained list ahead of the 2022–23 season and confirmed that McKeown would be among those released when his contract expires on 30 June. McKeown had made 432 league appearances and 505 in total for Grimsby over eleven seasons with the Mariners and was regarded as a club legend by the local media upon his departure.

=== Finn Harps ===
On 29 July 2022, McKeown was announced as signed for Finn Harps in the League of Ireland Premier Division, until the end of the 2022 league season in November. Following the end of the 2022 season, Finn Harps were relegated after losing 3–1 to UCD on 28 October 2022.

=== Cleethorpes Town ===
On 7 January 2023, McKeown signed for Cleethorpes Town, managed by his former Grimsby teammate Nathan Arnold. McKeown made his debut later that day during a 2–1 win over Tadcaster Albion.

McKeown signed a new one-year contract with Cleethorpes ahead of the 2023–24 season.

In December 2023, McKeown became mixed his playing duties by becoming the clubs first team goalkeeping coach.

== International career ==
Mckeown has been capped at under 19s with the Republic of Ireland U19 and was selected in the 2009–2010 squad for the European championships for the Republic of Ireland U21 on the substitute bench in November 2009 against Georgia and Armenia.

In April 2019, McKeown expressed an interest to represent San Marino and had hoped to be called up for their Euro 2020 qualifying games. McKeown's grandfather had moved from the country in the 1950s but he was having trouble in finding the documents and evidence he needed in order for him to play.

== Coaching career ==
In February 2026, he was announced as Grimsby Borough's goalkeeping coach.

== Career statistics ==
As of match played 5 August 2022

Appearances and goals by club, season and competition
Club	Season	League			National Cup (Note: Includes FA Cup & FAI Cup)		League Cup		Other		Total	
Club	Season	Division	Apps	Goals	Apps	Goals	Apps	Goals	Apps	Goals	Apps	Goals
Peterborough United	2007–08	League Two	1	0	0	0	0	0	0	0	1	0
Peterborough United	2008–09	League One	1	0	0	0	0	0	0	0	1	0
Peterborough United	2009–10	Championship	4	0	0	0	1	0	0	0	5	0
Peterborough United	2010–11	League One	0	0	0	0	0	0	0	0	0	0
Peterborough United	Total		6	0	0	0	1	0	0	0	7	0
Kettering Town (loan)	2007–08	Conference North	2	0	0	0	—		0	0	2	0
Worcester City (loan)	2007–08	Conference North	1	0	0	0	—		0	0	1	0
Boston United (loan)	2010–11	Conference North	17	0	0	0	—		2 (Note: Appearances in FA Trophy)	0	19	0
Grimsby Town	2011–12	Conference Premier	46	0	5	0	—		4	0	55	0
Grimsby Town	2012–13	Conference Premier	43	0	1	0	—		9 (Note: Seven appearances in the FA Trophy, two appearances in the Conference Premier play-offs)	0	53	0
Grimsby Town	2013–14	Conference Premier	45	0	5	0	—		8 (Note: Six appearances in the FA Trophy, two appearances in the Conference Premier play-offs)	0	58	0
Grimsby Town	2014–15	Conference Premier	46	0	2	0	—		6 (Note: Three appearances in the FA Trophy, three appearances in the Conference Premier play-offs)	0	54	0
Grimsby Town	2015–16	National League	45	0	4	0	—		11 (Note: Eight appearances in the FA Trophy, three appearances in the National League play-offs)	0	60	0
Grimsby Town	2016–17	League Two	39	0	1	0	1	0	2 (Note: Appearance(s) in EFL Trophy)	0	43	0
Grimsby Town	2017–18	League Two	37	0	1	0	1	0	0	0	39	0
Grimsby Town	2018–19	League Two	43	0	3	0	1	0	0	0	47	0
Grimsby Town	2019–20	League Two	36	0	1	0	3	0	1	0	41	0
Grimsby Town	2020–21	League Two	35	0	1	0	1	0	1	0	38	0
Grimsby Town	2021–22	National League	17	0	0	0	—		0	0	17	0
Grimsby Town	Total		432	0	24	0	7	0	42	0	505	0
Finn Harps	2022	League of Ireland Premier Division	1	0	1	0	—		0	0	2	0
Career total			459	0	25	0	8	0	44	0	536	0

== Honours ==
Peterborough United

- League One second-place promotion: 2008–09
- League Two second-place promotion: 2007–08

Grimsby Town

- National League play-offs: 2015–16, 2021–22
- FA Trophy runner-up: 2015–16
- Lincolnshire Senior Cup: 2011–12, 2012–13

Individual

- Conference Premier Team of the Year: 2012–13
- National League Team of the Year: 2015–16
- Grimsby Town Player of the Year: 2012–13, 2013–14, 2017–18, 2018–19
- Reusch Goalkeeper of the Year 2014–15
- PFA Fans' League Two Player of the Month: October 2018
- English Football League Team of the Week: May 2017
