= Luke McShane (footballer) =

English footballer

Personal information
- Date of birth: 6 November 1985 (age 40)
- Place of birth: Peterborough, England
- Position: Goalkeeper

Team information
- Current team: St Neots Town

Youth career
- –2003: Peterborough United

Senior career*
Years	Team	Apps	(Gls)
2003–2007	Peterborough United	0	(0)
2003	→ Deeping Rangers (loan)	?	(?)
2003–2004	→ Stamford (loan)	2	(0)
2004	→ Hornchurch (loan)	?	(?)
2005	→ Kettering Town (loan)	?	(?)
2005	→ Gravesend & Northfleet (loan)	5	(0)
2006	→ Basingstoke Town (loan)	?	(?)
2006	→ Kettering Town (loan)	1	(0)
2006	→ Worksop Town (loan)	2	(0)
2007	→ Gravesend & Northfleet (loan)	3	(0)
2007	Cambridge Regional College	?	(?)
2007	Cambridge United	0	(0)
- * Club domestic league appearances and goals as of 12:11, 22 August 2007 (UTC)

Luke McShane (born 6 November 1985) is a footballer playing for St Neots Town.

== Footballing career ==
=== Peterborough United ===
McShane started his career at Peterborough United and also had loan spells at Deeping Rangers, Stamford, Hornchurch, twice at Kettering Town, twice at Gravesend & Northfleet, Basingstoke Town and Worksop Town. He plays as a goalkeeper. On 12 March 2007 McShane was released by Peterborough United, after making one FA Cup appearance, a 2–0 win against MK Dons, earning praise from Posh manager Barry Fry after keeping a clean sheet, McShane was called into action just 10 minutes before kickoff due to a back injury that first choice 'keeper Mark Tyler had suffered in pre-match training. He was linked a group of non-league clubs after his release from Peterborough.

=== Cambridge United ===
After his release by Peterborough, McShane signed on non contract terms with Cambridge Regional College, before joining Cambridge United on 17 July 2007. On 1 March 2008 Cambridge United announced that McShane had left the club by mutual consent.

=== Spalding United ===
After being released by Cambridge McShane was bought by Unibond First Division South outfit Spalding United. He performed well in what a poor season for the Tulips.
