= Peter Gain =

Footballer (born 1976)

Personal information
- Full name: Peter Thomas Gain
- Date of birth: 11 November 1976 (age 49)
- Place of birth: Hammersmith, England
- Height: 6 ft 1 in (1.85 m)
- Position: Midfielder

Youth career
- ?–1995: Tottenham Hotspur

Senior career*
Years	Team	Apps	(Gls)
1995–1999	Tottenham Hotspur	0	(0)
1999	→ Lincoln City (loan)	3	(0)
1999–2005	Lincoln City	224	(21)
2005–2008	Peterborough United	71	(9)
2008–2012	Dagenham & Redbridge	149	(4)
Total		447	(34)

International career
1997	Republic of Ireland U21	1	(0)
- * Club domestic league appearances and goals

Peter Thomas Gain (born 11 November 1976) is a former professional footballer who played as a midfielder for Lincoln City, Dagenham & Redbridge, Tottenham Hotspur and Peterborough United. Born in Hammersmith, England, Gain represented the Republic of Ireland at youth, U-21, and B levels.

== Career ==
=== Peterborough United ===
In summer 2005, Gain rejected the offer of a new contract from Lincoln City, and signed for Peterborough United on a three-year deal.

=== Dagenham & Redbridge ===
On 17 January 2008, Gain signed for Dagenham & Redbridge on an 18-month contract.

On 5 October 2010, it was announced that Gain had agreed a new two-year contract with the club.

In May 2012, Gain was released by Dagenham following the expiry of his contract.

== Honours ==
Dagenham & Redbridge

- Football League Two play-offs: 2010
