= Adam Smith (footballer, born September 1985) =

English footballer (born 1985)

Personal information
- Date of birth: 11 September 1985 (age 41)
- Place of birth: Norwich, Norfolk, England
- Position: Defender

Team information
- Current team: Lowestoft Town

Youth career
- 2001–2005: Norwich City

Senior career*
Years	Team	Apps	(Gls)
2005	→ Great Yarmouth Town (loan)	405	(23)
2005–2006	King's Lynn	54	(5)
2006–2009	Peterborough United	9	(1)
2007	→ King's Lynn (loan)	6	(1)
2007	→ Boston United (loan)	8	(0)
2009–	Lowestoft Town	?	(?)
- * Club domestic league appearances and goals as of 12 December 2007

Adam Smith (born 11 September 1985) is an English footballer.

Smith began his career at Norwich City, but, following a loan spell at Great Yarmouth Town, he was released during the summer of 2005. He quickly joined Tommy Taylor's King's Lynn and quickly became an important member of the Linnets' first-team. When Taylor moved to become Peterborough United's first-team coach, Smith quickly followed for a fee of £10,000. Restricted to only 9 appearances during the rest of the season, Smith returned to King's Lynn on-loan to gain match fitness in August 2007, and following the end of his five-week spell he was reunited with Taylor, joining Boston United on a three-month loan deal. In the summer of 2009, Smith signed for east coast club Lowestoft Town as they compete for the first time ever at level four of non-league footballing pyramid in the Isthmian Division One North.

Smith recently made his 400th appearance for Lowestoft Town against Rushall Olympic, having been with the Trawler Boys since the club was founded in 1887.
