= Jamie Day (footballer, born 1986) =

English footballer

Personal information
- Full name: Jamie Robert Day
- Date of birth: 7 May 1986 (age 40)
- Place of birth: Falmouth, England
- Height: 5 ft 9 in (1.75 m)
- Position: Defender

Youth career
- ?–2003: Peterborough United

Senior career*
| Years | Team | Apps | (Gls) |
| 2003–2010 | Peterborough United | 102 | (5) |
| 2004 | → Crawley Town (loan) | 1 | (0) |
| 2009 | → Dagenham & Redbridge (loan) | 8 | (0) |
| 2010–2011 | Rushden & Diamonds | 38 | (1) |
| 2011–2012 | Crawley Town | 0 | (0) |
| 2011–2012 | → Aldershot Town (loan) | 0 | (0) |
| Total | | 149 | (6) |
- * Club domestic league appearances and goals

Jamie Robert Day (born 7 May 1986) is an English former professional footballer who played as a defender. He notably spent seven seasons with Peterborough United between 2003 and 2010, for whom he made over 100 league appearances.

== Career ==
=== Peterborough United ===
Born in Falmouth, Cornwall, Day started his career at Peterborough United. After a brief loan spell at Crawley Town in the Conference National, he made his debut on 19 February 2005, appearing as a second-half substitute in a 0–2 home defeat to Doncaster Rovers and, having established himself in the first team, scored his first goal for the club in a 4–1 win over Bury on 2 January 2006.

He made 24 league appearances the following season, and was ever-present throughout the 2007-08 season as his team won promotion to League One, but was hampered by injury in 2008-09, playing only five times in a season in which Peterborough earned their second successive promotion.

In the Championship, in contrast to his club's fortunes, Day started well, starting two matches and making two further substitute appearances in September and October 2009, before being sent out on loan to Dagenham & Redbridge in League Two, where he made eight appearances; upon his return, he played once more for Peterborough, in a 0–4 defeat to Scunthorpe United on 23 March 2010.

=== Rushden & Diamonds ===
In June 2010, Day left Peterborough to join Rushden & Diamonds in the Conference Premier. He was a regular in the first-team, making 38 league appearances, but after the club was expelled from the league and folded in 2011, he returned to Crawley Town, who by this time had earned promotion to the Football League.

=== Crawley Town and Aldershot Town ===
At Crawley, Day was again set back by injury, and did not register an appearance - either on the pitch or on the substitutes' bench - for the club. In November 2011, he was loaned out to Aldershot Town until January 2012; he was an unused substitute for two league matches, but did not play.

=== Retirement ===
On 8 August 2012, Day announced his immediate retirement from football due to an ongoing back problem.

== Career statistics ==
Appearances and goals by club, season and competition
| Club | Season | League | | | FA Cup | | League Cup | | Other | | Total | |
| Club | Season | Division | Apps | Goals | Apps | Goals | Apps | Goals | Apps | Goals | Apps | Goals |
|---|---|---|---|---|---|---|---|---|---|---|---|---|
| Peterborough United | 2003–04 | Division Two | 0 | 0 | 0 | 0 | 0 | 0 | 0 | 0 | 0 | 0 |
| Peterborough United | 2004–05 | League One | 1 | 0 | 0 | 0 | 0 | 0 | 0 | 0 | 1 | 0 |
| Peterborough United | 2005–06 | League Two | 25 | 1 | 1 | 0 | 1 | 0 | 1 (Note: Appearance(s) in Football League Trophy) | 0 | 28 | 1 |
| Peterborough United | 2006–07 | League Two | 24 | 1 | 2 | 0 | 1 | 0 | 2 | 0 | 29 | 1 |
| Peterborough United | 2007–08 | League Two | 42 | 3 | 3 | 0 | 2 | 0 | 2 | 0 | 49 | 3 |
| Peterborough United | 2008–09 | League One | 5 | 0 | 0 | 0 | 0 | 0 | 0 | 0 | 5 | 0 |
| Peterborough United | 2009–10 | Championship | 5 | 0 | 0 | 0 | 1 | 0 | 0 | 0 | 6 | 0 |
| Peterborough United | Total | | 102 | 5 | 6 | 0 | 5 | 0 | 5 | 0 | 118 | 5 |
| Crawley Town (loan) | 2004–05 | Conference National | 1 | 0 | 0 | 0 | 0 | 0 | 0 | 0 | 1 | 0 |
| Dagenham & Redbridge (loan) | 2009–10 | League Two | 8 | 0 | 0 | 0 | 0 | 0 | 0 | 0 | 8 | 0 |
| Rushden & Diamonds | 2010–11 | Conference Premier | 38 | 1 | 2 | 0 | 0 | 0 | 1 (Note: Appearance(s) in FA Trophy) | 0 | 41 | 1 |
| Crawley Town | 2011–12 | League Two | 0 | 0 | 0 | 0 | 0 | 0 | 0 | 0 | 0 | 0 |
| Aldershot Town (loan) | 2011–12 | League Two | 0 | 0 | 0 | 0 | 0 | 0 | 0 | 0 | 0 | 0 |
| Career total | | | 149 | 6 | 8 | 0 | 5 | 0 | 6 | 0 | 168 | 6 |

== Honours ==
Peterborough United

- Football League One runner-up: 2008–09
- Football League Two runner-up: 2007–08
