= Tom Williams (footballer, born 1980) =

Cypriot footballer

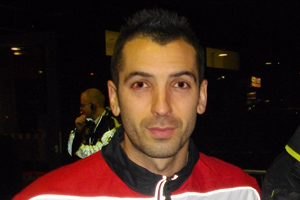
- Williams in 2011

Personal information
- Full name: Thomas Andrew Williams
- Date of birth: 8 July 1980 (age 46)
- Place of birth: Carshalton, England
- Height: 6 ft 0 in (1.83 m)
- Positions: Defender; midfielder

Senior career*
| Years | Team | Apps | (Gls) |
| 1998–2000 | Walton & Hersham | | |
| 2000–2001 | West Ham United | 0 | (0) |
| 2001 | → Peterborough United (loan) | 2 | (0) |
| 2001–2002 | Peterborough United | 34 | (2) |
| 2002–2004 | Birmingham City | 4 | (0) |
| 2002–2003 | → Queens Park Rangers (loan) | 26 | (1) |
| 2003 | → Queens Park Rangers (loan) | 5 | (0) |
| 2003–2004 | → Peterborough United (loan) | 14 | (0) |
| 2004 | Peterborough United | 7 | (1) |
| 2004–2005 | Barnsley | 39 | (0) |
| 2005–2006 | Gillingham | 13 | (0) |
| 2006–2007 | Swansea City | 46 | (0) |
| 2007 | Wycombe Wanderers | 10 | (0) |
| 2007–2008 | → Peterborough United (loan) | 7 | (0) |
| 2008–2010 | Peterborough United | 40 | (0) |
| 2009 | → Queens Park Rangers (loan) | 5 | (0) |
| 2010 | → Preston North End (loan) | 10 | (0) |
| 2010–2011 | Bristol City | 1 | (0) |
| 2010 | → Colchester United (loan) | 7 | (1) |
| 2011 | Walsall | 14 | (1) |
| 2011 | Kettering Town | 1 | (0) |
| 2012–2013 | Notts County | 1 | (0) |
| 2014 | Guildford City | 3 | (0) |
| 2014 | Amicale | | |
| 2016 | Slough Town | 5 | (0) |
| 2016 | Arizona United | 5 | (0) |
| 2017 | Houghton & Wyton | 2 | (0) |
| 2018–2020 | Hashtag United | 25 | (3) |
| Total | | 326 | (10) |

International career
| 2006 | Cyprus | 1 | (0) |
- * Club domestic league appearances and goals

Thomas Andrew Williams (born 8 July 1980) is a former professional footballer who played as a defender and midfielder. He made nearly 300 appearances in the Football League playing for numerous clubs. Born in England, he made one appearance for the Cyprus national team.

== Club career ==
Williams was born in Carshalton, London. His professional career began with West Ham United in April 2000 when he joined the club from Walton & Hersham for a fee of £40,000. He went on loan to Peterborough United in March 2001, without having made his senior debut, and the move was made permanent during the summer. He stayed with the Posh for one season, before moving to Birmingham City for a fee of £350,000.

His career stalled at St Andrew's, playing just four games for Birmingham, and, after two loan periods at Queens Park Rangers, during which he scored once, against Huddersfield Town, he rejoined Peterborough United, initially on loan, later joining permanently. In May 2004 Williams went to Barnsley on a free transfer.

He played a full season for the South Yorkshire side, before moving again on a free transfer to Gillingham in July 2005, and then signing for Swansea City in January 2006 after the Gills suffered financial problems. He returned to the side in December 2006 after a hernia operation in November, and was released at the end of the season.

On 27 July 2007, he joined Wycombe Wanderers on a two-year deal.

On 31 December 2007, Williams joined Peterborough United for the third time, initially on an emergency loan to make him available for the match on New Year's Day, for which he was an unused substitute. The loan was converted to a permanent deal two days later.

On 9 November 2009, Williams rejoined Championship side Queens Park Rangers on a short-term loan deal, with a possible view to sign permanently in the January transfer window. This did not happen in the end and he returned to Peterborough during January 2010.

Williams joined former boss Darren Ferguson at Preston North End on loan for the rest of the season. Preston decided not to sign him on a permanent basis, and he returned to Peterborough, where he was released following his contract expiry.

After a pre-season trial, Williams joined Championship club Bristol City on a six-month contract on 5 August 2010.

Williams joined Colchester United on a month's loan on 30 September, later extended for a further two months. He made nine appearances in all competitions and scored once, in a 2–1 win over AFC Bournemouth. Williams' Bristol City contract was terminated on 5 January 2011.

On 14 February, he joined League One club Walsall until the end of the season. He made fourteen league appearances and scored once, in a 1–1 draw with Oldham Athletic. In August 2011, Williams played one match in the Conference for Kettering Town, a 3–0 defeat away at Mansfield Town. He signed for Notts County in August 2012 on a short-term deal, and was released in January 2013 when his contract expired.

Williams played for Southern League Division 1 South and West club Guildford City in early 2014.

In February 2014, Williams was one of a number of foreign signings made by Vanuatu club Amicale to strengthen their team ahead of the 2013–14 OFC Champions League campaign.

He joined Slough Town in March 2016, making five Southern League appearances, before making five appearances for Arizona United in the 2016 USL season. In September 2017 he was playing for Houghton & Wyton in the Cambridgeshire County Football League.

Following a trial in July 2018, Williams joined Hashtag United of the Eastern Counties League Division One South. After his first season ended with promotion as champions, Williams moved into a player-coach role for the 2019–20 season. On 3 September, during an Essex Senior Cup first round win away to Halstead Town, he seriously injured a hand after smashing a home dressing room window after he had received a red card. He scored 3 goals in 25 league games for Hashtag United. On 4 February 2020, Williams played his final competitive game for Hashtag United in a 2–2 draw against West Essex in the Errington Challenge Cup, before the outbreak of COVID-19 halted the season.

== International career ==
Williams qualifies for Cyprus through his mother, and has one international cap, which came in 2006.

== Personal life ==
Williams is married to former glamour model Nicola McLean.

== Career statistics ==
Appearances and goals by club, season and competition
| Club | Season | League | | | FA Cup | | League Cup | | Other | | Total | |
| Club | Season | Division | Apps | Goals | Apps | Goals | Apps | Goals | Apps | Goals | Apps | Goals |
|---|---|---|---|---|---|---|---|---|---|---|---|---|
| West Ham United | 2000–01 | Premier League | 0 | 0 | 0 | 0 | 0 | 0 | 0 | 0 | 0 | 0 |
| Peterborough United (loan) | 2000–01 | Division Two | 2 | 0 | 0 | 0 | 0 | 0 | 0 | 0 | 2 | 0 |
| Peterborough United | 2001–02 | Division Two | 34 | 2 | 5 | 0 | 2 | 0 | 1 (Note: Appearance(s) in Football League Trophy) | 0 | 42 | 2 |
| Birmingham City | 2001–02 | Division One | 4 | 0 | 0 | 0 | 0 | 0 | 0 | 0 | 4 | 0 |
| Birmingham City | 2002–03 | Premier League | 0 | 0 | 0 | 0 | 0 | 0 | 0 | 0 | 0 | 0 |
| Birmingham City | 2003–04 | Premier League | 0 | 0 | 0 | 0 | 0 | 0 | 0 | 0 | 0 | 0 |
| Birmingham City | Total | | 4 | 0 | 0 | 0 | 0 | 0 | 0 | 0 | 4 | 0 |
| Queens Park Rangers (loan) | 2002–03 | Division Two | 26 | 1 | 2 | 0 | 1 | 0 | 3 (Note: Appearance(s) in Division Two play-offs) | 0 | 33 | 1 |
| Queens Park Rangers (loan) | 2003–04 | Division Two | 5 | 0 | 0 | 0 | 0 | 0 | 0 | 0 | 5 | 0 |
| Queens Park Rangers (loan) | Total | | 31 | 1 | 2 | 0 | 1 | 0 | 3 | 0 | 37 | 1 |
| Peterborough United (loan) | 2003–04 | Division Two | 14 | 0 | 1 | 0 | 0 | 0 | 0 | 0 | 15 | 0 |
| Peterborough United | 2003–04 | Division Two | 7 | 1 | 0 | 0 | 0 | 0 | 0 | 0 | 7 | 1 |
| Barnsley | 2004–05 | League One | 39 | 0 | 1 | 0 | 2 | 0 | 1 | 0 | 43 | 0 |
| Gillingham | 2005–06 | League One | 13 | 0 | 1 | 0 | 2 | 0 | 2 | 0 | 18 | 0 |
| Swansea City | 2005–06 | League One | 17 | 0 | 0 | 0 | 0 | 0 | 1 (Note: Appearance(s) in League One play-offs) | 0 | 18 | 0 |
| Swansea City | 2006–07 | League One | 29 | 0 | 2 | 0 | 1 | 0 | 2 | 0 | 34 | 0 |
| Swansea City | Total | | 46 | 0 | 2 | 0 | 1 | 0 | 3 | 0 | 52 | 0 |
| Wycombe Wanderers | 2007–08 | League Two | 10 | 0 | 1 | 0 | 1 | 0 | 1 | 0 | 13 | 0 |
| Peterborough United (loan) | 2007–08 | League Two | 7 | 0 | 0 | 0 | 0 | 0 | 0 | 0 | 7 | 0 |
| Peterborough United | 2008–09 | League One | 25 | 0 | 3 | 0 | 1 | 0 | 1 | 0 | 30 | 0 |
| Peterborough United | 2009–10 | Championship | 15 | 0 | 1 | 0 | 2 | 1 | 0 | 0 | 18 | 1 |
| Peterborough United | Total | | 40 | 1 | 4 | 0 | 3 | 1 | 1 | 0 | 48 | 2 |
| Queens Park Rangers (loan) | 2009–10 | Championship | 5 | 0 | 0 | 0 | 0 | 0 | 0 | 0 | 5 | 0 |
| Preston North End (loan) | 2009–10 | Championship | 10 | 0 | 0 | 0 | 0 | 0 | 0 | 0 | 10 | 0 |
| Bristol City | 2010–11 | Championship | 1 | 0 | 0 | 0 | 0 | 0 | 0 | 0 | 1 | 0 |
| Colchester United (loan) | 2010–11 | League One | 7 | 1 | 2 | 0 | 0 | 0 | 0 | 0 | 9 | 1 |
| Walsall | 2010–11 | League One | 14 | 1 | 0 | 0 | 0 | 0 | 0 | 0 | 14 | 1 |
| Kettering Town | 2011–12 | Conference Premier | 1 | 0 | 0 | 0 | 0 | 0 | 0 | 0 | 1 | 0 |
| Notts County | 2012–13 | League One | 1 | 0 | 1 | 0 | 1 | 0 | 0 | 0 | 3 | 0 |
| Guildford City | 2013–14 | Southern League Division One South & West | 3 | 0 | 0 | 0 | 0 | 0 | 0 | 0 | 3 | 0 |
| Amicale | 2013–14 | Port Vila Premier League | 0 | 0 | 0 | 0 | 0 | 0 | 0 | 0 | 0 | 0 |
| Slough Town | 2015–16 | Southern League Premier Division | 5 | 0 | 0 | 0 | 0 | 0 | 1 (Note: Appearance(s) in Southern League Cup) | 0 | 6 | 0 |
| Arizona United | 2016 | USL | 5 | 0 | 1 | 0 | 0 | 0 | 0 | 0 | 6 | 0 |
| Houghton & Wyton | 2017–18 | Cambridgeshire County Football League | 2 | 0 | 0 | 0 | 0 | 0 | 0 | 0 | 2 | 0 |
| Hashtag United | 2018–19 | Eastern Counties League First Division South | 21 | 2 | 0 | 0 | 0 | 0 | 4 (Note: Appearance(s) in First Division Knockout Cup) | 0 | 25 | 2 |
| Hashtag United | 2019–20 | Essex Senior League | 4 | 1 | 0 | 0 | 0 | 0 | 3 (Note: One Appearance(s) in Essex Senior Cup) (Note: Two appearances in Errington Challenge Cup) | 0 | 7 | 1 |
| Hashtag United | Total | | 25 | 3 | 0 | 0 | 0 | 0 | 7 | 0 | 32 | 3 |
| Career total | | | 326 | 10 | 21 | 0 | 13 | 1 | 20 | 0 | 380 | 11 |

== Honours ==
Hashtag United

- Eastern Counties League Division One South: 2018–19
