= 2010–11 Peterborough United F.C. season =

Peterborough United
2010–11 season
- Chairman: Darragh MacAnthony
- Manager: Darren Ferguson
- Stadium: London Road Stadium
- League One: 4th (promoted)
- FA Cup: Third round
- League Cup: Third round
- Football League Trophy: Second round
- Top goalscorer: League: Mackail-Smith (25); All: Mackail-Smith (30)
- Highest home attendance: 10,116 (30 October vs Brighton & Hove Albion)
- Lowest home attendance: 2,312 (16 November vs Stockport County)
- Average home league attendance: 6,396
Home colours	Away colours

During the 2010–11 Peterborough United F.C. season saw the club play in the Football League One after relegation from Football League Championship after spending just the 2009–10 season in the Championship.

== Squad ==
Updated 1 March 2011.

Note: Flags indicate national team as defined under FIFA eligibility rules; some limited exceptions apply. Players may hold more than one non-FIFA nationality.

No.	Pos.	Nation	Player
1	GK	ENG	Joe Lewis
2	DF	ENG	Mark Little
3	DF	ENG	Tom Kennedy (on loan from Leicester City)
4	DF	ENG	Kelvin Langmead
5	DF	COD	Gabriel Zakuani
6	DF	ENG	Charlie Lee
7	MF	AUS	James Wesolowski
8	MF	IRL	Lee Frecklington
9	FW	ENG	David Ball
10	MF	SCO	George Boyd
11	MF	NIR	Grant McCann (club captain)
12	FW	SCO	Craig Mackail-Smith
14	MF	ENG	Tommy Rowe

No.	Pos.	Nation	Player
15	FW	ENG	Dave Hibbert
16	DF	ENG	Ryan Bennett
18	MF	ENG	Chris Whelpdale
19	MF	ENG	Nathaniel Mendez-Laing (on loan from Wolves)
20	MF	ENG	Nathan Koranteng
21	MF	WAL	Arron Davies
24	MF	ENG	Lee Tomlin
27	DF	WAL	Grant Basey
28	GK	ENG	Paul Jones (on loan from Exeter City)
31	MF	ENG	Jay Davies
32	MF	ENG	Nathan Ralph
—	MF	ENG	Dominic Green
—	FW	ENG	Paul Taylor

== Transfers ==
=== In ===
Date	Pos.	Name	From	Fee	Ref.
17 May 2010	FW	David Hibbert	Shrewsbury Town	Free	
24 May 2010	MF	Grant McCann	Scunthorpe United	Free	
25 May 2010	DF	Mark Little	Wolverhampton Wanderers	Free	
1 June 2010	MF	James Wesolowski	Leicester City	Undisclosed	
24 June 2010	DF	Kelvin Langmead	Shrewsbury Town	Undisclosed	
1 July 2010	DF	Nana Ofori-Twumasi	Chelsea	Free	
9 July 2010	MF	Arron Davies	Unattached	Free	
6 August 2010	MF	Lee Tomlin	Rushden & Diamonds	Undisclosed	
6 August 2010	GK	Steve Collis	Bristol City	Undisclosed	
21 January 2011	DF	Grant Basey	Barnet	Free	
31 January 2011	FW	David Ball	Manchester City	Undisclosed	
28 February 2011	FW	Paul Taylor	Unattached	Free	

=== Loans in ===
Date from	Pos.	Name	From	Date until	Ref.
1 July 2010	MF	Nathaniel Mendez-Laing	Wolverhampton Wanderers	End of season	
23 September 2010	MF	Matt Gill	Norwich City		
1 November 2010	DF	Lewin Nyatanga	Bristol City		
19 November 2010	MF	Adam Clayton	Leeds United	31 January 2011	
12 November 2010	DF	Marcus Williams	Reading		
6 January 2011	FW	Kieran Agard	Everton		
7 January 2011	FW	Jonathan Obika	Tottenham Hotspur	February 2011	
20 January 2011	DF	Tom Kennedy	Leicester City		
31 January 2011	GK	Paul Jones	Exeter City		

=== Out ===
Date	Pos.	Name	To	Fee	Ref.
30 June 2010	DF	Sam Gaughran		Released	
30 June 2010	MF	Billy Crook		Released	
30 June 2010	DF	Danny Blanchett	(Crewe Alexandra)	Released	
30 June 2010	DF	Jamie Day	Rushden & Diamonds	Contract expired	
6 July 2010	DF	Craig Morgan	Preston North End	£400,000	
8 July 2010	MF	Sergio Torres	Crawley Town	£100,000	
30 December 2010	FW	Aaron McLean	Hull City	£1,300,000	
31 December 2010	MF	Josh Simpson	Crawley Town	Undisclosed	
31 December 2010	DF	Liam Hatch	Darlington	Undisclosed	

=== Loans out ===
Date from	Pos.	Name	To	Date until	Ref.
30 July 2010	MF	Romone McCrae	Histon	3 January 2011	
30 July 2010	FW	Danny Mills	Histon	3 January 2011	
2 August 2010	DF	Exodus Geohaghon	Rotherham United	2 November 2010	
13 August 2010	FW	Rene Howe	Rushden & Diamonds	January 2011	
13 August 2010	GK	James McKeown	Boston United	January 2011	
16 August 2010	MF	Dominic Green	Rushden & Diamonds	16 September 2010	
23 August 2010	FW	Nathan Koranteng	Rushden & Diamonds	23 September 2010	
2 November 2010	DF	Exodus Geohaghon	Shrewsbury Town	January 2011	
12 November 2010	MF	Chris Whelpdale	Gillingham	12 December 2010	
12 November 2010	DF	Charlie Lee	Gillingham	12 December 2010	
23 December 2010	MF	Joe Newell	St Albans City		
1 January 2011	DF	Carl Piergianni	Altrincham		
24 January 2011	DF	Exodus Geohaghon	Port Vale	End of season	
28 January 2011	FW	Rene Howe	Bristol Rovers	30 April 2011	
15 February 2011	MF	Romone McCrae	Kettering Town	End of season	
15 February 2011	FW	Danny Mills	Kettering Town	End of season	

== Competitions ==
=== League One ===
==== League table ====
Pos	Team	Pld	W	D	L	GF	GA	GD	Pts	Promotion, qualification or relegation
2	Southampton (P)	46	28	8	10	86	38	+48	92	Promotion to Football League Championship
3	Huddersfield Town	46	25	12	9	77	48	+29	87	Qualification for League One play-offs
4	Peterborough United (O, P)	46	23	10	13	106	75	+31	79	Qualification for League One play-offs
5	Milton Keynes Dons	46	23	8	15	67	60	+7	77	Qualification for League One play-offs
6	Bournemouth	46	19	14	13	75	54	+21	71	Qualification for League One play-offs

Updated to match(es) played on 2 May 2011. Source: BBC
Rules for classification: 1) points; 2) goal difference; 3) number of goals scored.
(O) Play-off winners; (P) Promoted

==== Matches ====
7 August 2010	Peterborough United	3–0	Bristol Rovers	London Road Stadium
15:00	Boyd 57'; McLean 73'; McCann 88'			Attendance: 7,113

14 August 2010	AFC Bournemouth	5–1	Peterborough United	The Fitness First Stadium
15:00	Pugh 10'; Robinson 20'; Pitman 50', 57', 65'		Langmead 61'	Attendance: 5,949

21 August 2010	Peterborough United	4–2	Huddersfield Town	London Road Stadium
15:00	Boyd 45'; McLean 50', 67'; Mackail-Smith 52'		Rhodes 22'; Carey 33'	Attendance: 6,647

28 August 2010	Plymouth Argyle	0–3	Peterborough United	Home Park
15:00			Mackail-Smith 61', 75'; McLean 77'	Attendance: 7,712

4 September 2010	Tranmere Rovers	1–0	Peterborough United	Prenton Park
15:00	Mendy 44'			Attendance: 4,636

11 September 2010	Peterborough United	5–2	Oldham Athletic	London Road Stadium
15:00	Wesolowski 45'; McLean 62'; Boyd 71'; Hibbert 82'; McCann 90' (pen.)		Jones 19'; Taylor 38'	Attendance: 6,337

18 September 2010	Exeter City	2–2	Peterborough United	St James Park
15:00	Nardiello 54'; Cureton 71'		Archibald-Henville 29' (o.g.); Tomlin 82'	Attendance: 5,146

25 September 2010	Peterborough United	2–1	Milton Keynes Dons	London Road Stadium
15:00	Mackail-Smith 36'; McLean 48'		Lewington 37'	Attendance: 7,838

28 September 2010	Peterborough United	2–3	Notts County	London Road Stadium
19:45	Zakuani 36'; Mackail-Smith 59'; McCann (red card) 66'		Davies 31', 34'; Westcarr 43'; Ravenhill (red card) 90'	Attendance: 6,136

2 October 2010	Carlisle United	0–1	Peterborough United	Brunton Park
15:00			Mackail-Smith 32'	Attendance: 5,737

9 October 2010	Hartlepool United	2–0	Peterborough United	Victoria Park
15:00	Hartley 44'; Liddle 90'		Tomlin (red card) 82'	Attendance: 3,047

16 October 2010	Peterborough United	5–4	Swindon Town	London Road Stadium
15:00	Mackail-Smith 3', 5'; Frecklington 22'; Boyd 58'; Amankwaah 90' (o.g.)		Ball 24', 43'; Ritchie 30'; Austin 73' (pen.)	Attendance: 7,077

23 October 2010	Brentford	2–1	Peterborough United	Griffin Park
15:00	Woodman 39'; Alexander 58'		McCann 19' (pen.)	Attendance: 6,543

30 October 2010	Peterborough United	0–3	Brighton & Hove Albion	London Road Stadium
15:00	Boyd (red card) 25'		Barnes 16', 62' (pen.); Calderón 33'	Attendance: 10,116

2 November 2010	Walsall	1–3	Peterborough United	Bank's Stadium
19:45	Gray 53'		Bennett 15'; Davies 17'; Langmead 55'	Attendance: 3,294

13 November 2010	Peterborough United	1–5	Charlton Athletic	London Road Stadium
15:00	McCann 54'		Jackson 15' (pen.); Racon 25'; Martin 38', 65'	Attendance: 7,477

20 November 2010	Southampton	4–1	Peterborough United	St Mary's Stadium
15:00	Barnard 28'; Fonte 46'; Chaplow 50'; Guly 80'		McLean 76'	Attendance: 22,177

23 November 2010	Peterborough United	2–2	Leyton Orient	London Road Stadium
19:45	McLean 18' (pen.), 61'		Revell 43'; Smith 86'	Attendance: 4,423

10 December 2010	Peterborough United	2–1	Rochdale	London Road Stadium
19:45	McLean 19'; Craig Mackail-Smith 50'		Akpa Akpro 79'	Attendance: 4,233

28 December 2010	Swindon Town	1–1	Peterborough United	County Ground
15:00	Austin 72' (pen.)		Tomlin 17'	Attendance: 8,592

3 January 2011	Peterborough United	4–1	Walsall	London Road Stadium
15:00	Mackail-Smith 36', 71'; Mendez-Laing 81'; Bennett 90'		Nicholls 10'	Attendance: 5,517

11 January 2011	Peterborough United	2–1	Brentford	London Road Stadium
19:45	McCann 5' (pen.); Obika 90'		Laird 74'	Attendance: 4,667

15 January 2011	Brighton & Hove Albion	3–1	Peterborough United	Withdean Stadium
15:00	Wood 25', 55'; Bennett 27'		Tomlin 66'; McCann (red card) 90'	Attendance: 7,233

22 January 2011	Peterborough United	4–0	Hartlepool United	London Road Stadium
15:00	Mackail-Smith 62'; Rowe 64'; Tomlin 68'; Wesolowski 90'			Attendance: 5,800

28 January 2011	Colchester United	2–1	Peterborough United	Weston Homes Community Stadium
19:45	Gillespie 37'; Mooney 86'		Rowe 1'

1 February 2011	Peterborough United	5–3	Sheffield Wednesday	London Road Stadium
19:45	Mackail-Smith 16', 90'; Boyd 26', 74'; Mendez-Laing 84'		J. Johnson 5'; Madine 21'; Sedgwick 35'; Potter (red card) 69'	Attendance: 6,480

5 February 2011	Peterborough United	4–4	Southampton	London Road Stadium
17:20	Mackail-Smith 39'; Whelpdale 45'; McCann 55' (pen.); Tomlin 90' (pen.)		Chaplow 18'; Lambert 31' (pen.), 47' (pen.); Hammond 50'	Attendance: 6,905

12 February 2011	Charlton Athletic	3–2	Peterborough United	The Valley
15:00	Jackson 57'; Bradley Wright-Phillips 59'; Langmead 80' (o.g.)		Tomlin 29'; Mackail-Smith 90'	Attendance: 15,909

15 February 2011	Yeovil Town	0–2	Peterborough United	Huish Park
19:45			Mackail-Smith 85'; Basey 88'	Attendance: 3,351

19 February 2011	Peterborough United	2–1	Tranmere Rovers	London Road Stadium
15:00	McCann 53'; Showunmi 90' (o.g)		Welsh 24'	Attendance: 5,774

22 February 2011	Peterborough United	1–1	Colchester United	London Road Stadium
19:45	Boyd 6'		Henderson 17'	Attendance: 5,758

26 February 2011	Oldham Athletic	0–5	Peterborough United	Boundary Park
15:00			Rowe 49'; Ball 52'; Zakuani 61'; Mackail-Smith 68', 83'	Attendance: 4,263

5 March 2011	Peterborough United	3–0	Exeter City	London Road Stadium
15:00	Boyd 10', 74'; Mackail-Smith 68'			Attendance: 6,174

8 March 2011	Notts County	0–1	Peterborough United	Meadow Lane
19:45			Lee 57'	Attendance: 5,714

12 March 2011	Peterborough United	6–0	Carlisle United	London Road Stadium
15:00	Rowe 2'; Mackail-Smith 24'; Boyd 45', 83'; Bennett 77'; Ball 90'			Attendance: 6,467

15 March 2011	Sheffield Wednesday	1–4	Peterborough United	Hillsborough
19:45	Heffernan 52'		Mackail-Smith 25'; Tomlin 35'; Boyd 41', 81'	Attendance: 16,014

21 March 2011	Milton Keynes Dons	1–0	Peterborough United	stadium:mk
19:45	MacKenzie 69'			Attendance: 10,019

25 March 2011	Bristol Rovers	2–2	Peterborough United	Memorial Stadium
19:45	Kuffour 6'; Hughes 57'		Anthony 23' (o.g); Boyd 53'	Attendance: 6,589

1 April 2011	Peterborough United	3–3	AFC Bournemouth	London Road Stadium
19:45	Mackail-Smith 11', 42'; Rowe 15'		Ings 35'; Fletcher 71'; Smith 90+3'	Attendance: 6,670

5 April 2011	Dagenham & Redbridge	0–2	Peterborough United	Victoria Road
19:45			Ball 3', 8'	Attendance: 2,603

9 April 2011	Huddersfield Town	1–1	Peterborough United	Galpharm Stadium
15:00	Hunt 90'		McCann 41' (pen.)	Attendance: 16,431

16 April 2011	Peterborough United	2–1	Plymouth Argyle	London Road Stadium
15:00	Bennett 55'; Mackail-Smith 70'		Fletcher 38'	Attendance: 6,723

22 April 2011	Leyton Orient	2–1	Peterborough United	Brisbane Road
15:00	Zakuani 67' (o.g); Jarvis 90'		Mendez-Laing 75'	Attendance: 5,476

25 April 2011	Peterborough United	2–2	Yeovil Town	London Road Stadium
15:00	Langmead 87'; Mackail-Smith 89'		Wotton 23' (pen.); Tutte 87'	Attendance: 6,489

30 April 2011	Rochdale	2–2	Peterborough United	Crown Oil Arena
15:00	Akpa Akpro 1'; Dawson 87'		Nathaniel Mendez-Laing 45+1'; Tomlin 46'	Attendance: 3,147

5 May 2011	Peterborough United	5–0	Dagenham & Redbridge	London Road Stadium
15:00	Mendez-Laing 11'; McCann 65'; Boyd 82'; Mackail-Smith 84'; Ball 90+1'			Attendance: 7,519

==== Play-offs ====
15 May 2011	Milton Keynes Dons	3–2	Peterborough United	Stadium mk, Milton Keynes
12:15	Powell 47'; Baldock 50'; Balanta 56'	Report	Mackail-Smith 8'; McCann 81' (pen.)	Attendance: 12,662; Referee: Jonathan Moss

19 May 2011	Peterborough United	2–0	Milton Keynes Dons	London Road, Peterborough
19:45	McCann 11'; Mackail-Smith 54'	Report		Attendance: 11,920; Referee: Colin Webster

29 May 2011	Huddersfield Town	0–3	Peterborough United	Old Trafford, Manchester
15:00		Report	Rowe 78'; Mackail-Smith 80'; McCann 85'	Attendance: 48,410; Referee: Steve Tanner

=== FA Cup ===
6 November 2010 First round	Stockport County	1–1	Peterborough United	Edgeley Park
15:00	Griffin 20'		McLean 28'	Attendance: 2,001

16 November 2010 First round replay	Peterborough United	4–1	Stockport County	London Road Stadium
19:45	Langmead 24'; Mackail-Smith 47'; Tomlin 56'; McLean 90'		Tansey 72'	Attendance: 2,312

27 November 2010 Second round	Bury	1–2	Peterborough United	Gigg Lane
15:00	Lowe 51'		Tomlin 13'; Mackail-Smith 38'	Attendance: 2,514

8 January 2011 Third round	Fulham	6–2	Peterborough United	Craven Cottage
15:00	Kamara 32', 59', 76'; Etuhu 45'; Gera 66'; Greening 89'		Tomlin 71'; McCann 86' (pen.)	Attendance: 15,936

=== League Cup ===
10 August 2010 First round	Peterborough United	4–1	Rotherham United	London Road Stadium
19:45	Bennett 34'; Boyd 39'; McLean 60'; Mackail-Smith 85'		Marshall 9'	Attendance: 4,145

24 August 2010 Second round	Peterborough United	2–1	Cardiff City	London Road Stadium
19:45	Mackail-Smith 74'; Boyd 88'		Bothroyd 31'	Attendance: 3,806

21 September 2010 Third round	Peterborough United	1–3	Swansea City	London Road Stadium
19:45	Mackail-Smith 7'		Sinclair 5', 41', 78'	Attendance: 4,164

=== Football League Trophy ===
5 October 2010 Northern section second round	Huddersfield Town	3–2	Peterborough United	Galpharm Stadium
19:00	Carey 6'; Pilkington 12,14'		McLean 51'; Little 87'	Attendance: 2,904
