= George Boyd (footballer) =

Association football player (born 1985)

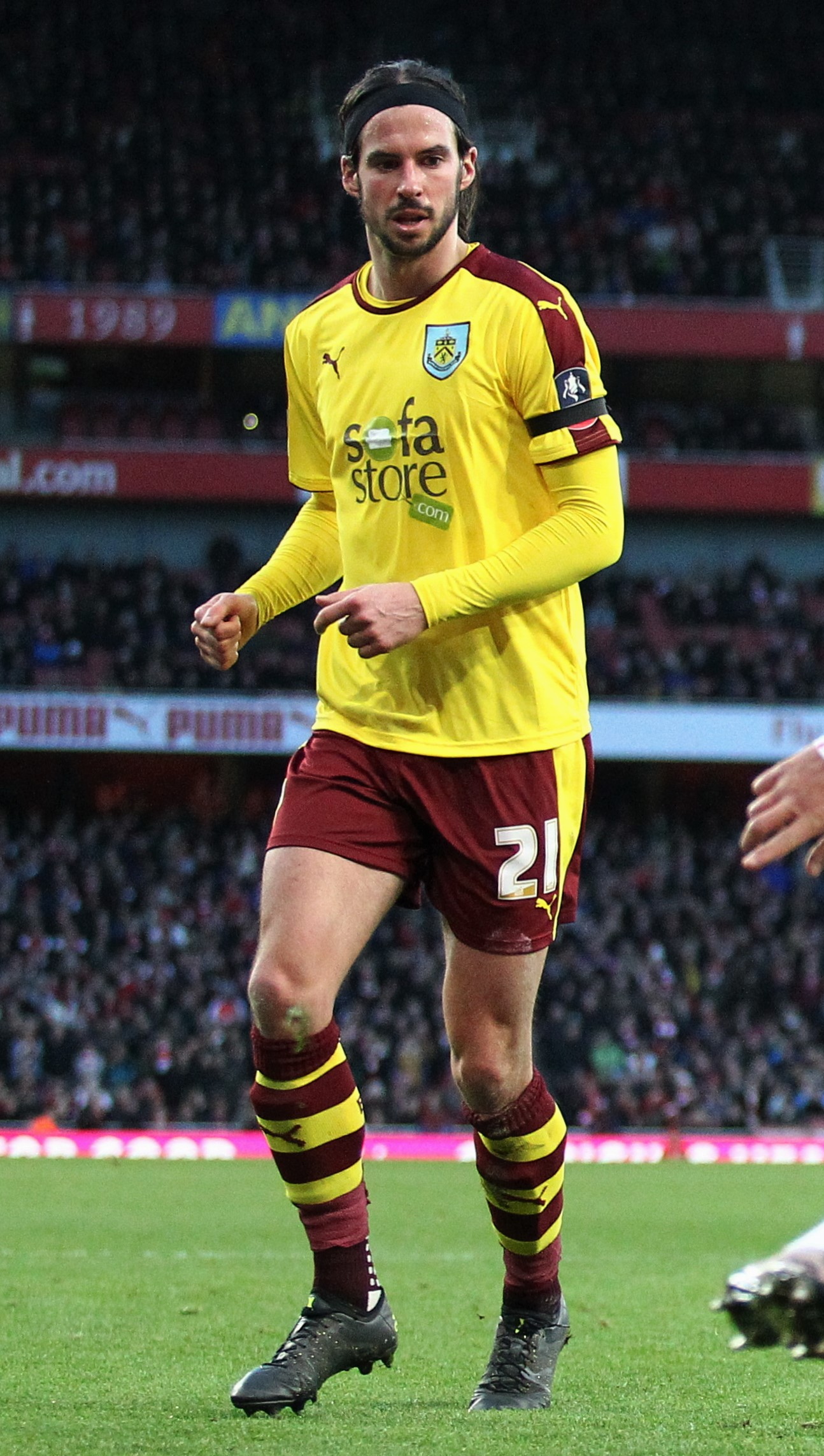
- Boyd playing for Burnley in 2016

Personal information
- Full name: George Jan Boyd
- Date of birth: 2 October 1985 (age 41)
- Place of birth: Chatham, England
- Height: 6 ft 1 in (1.86 m)
- Positions: Attacking midfielder; winger

Youth career
- 1996–2001: Charlton Athletic
- 2001–2002: Stevenage Borough

Senior career*
Years	Team	Apps	(Gls)
2002–2007	Stevenage Borough	111	(24)
2007–2013	Peterborough United	263	(64)
2010	→ Nottingham Forest (loan)	6	(1)
2013	→ Hull City (loan)	13	(4)
2013–2014	Hull City	30	(2)
2014–2017	Burnley	115	(12)
2017–2019	Sheffield Wednesday	40	(3)
2019–2020	Peterborough United	22	(0)
2020–2021	Salford City	11	(0)
2023–2025	Wythenshawe Town	55	(23)
Total		666	(133)

International career
2005–2006	England C	6	(1)
2009	Scotland B	1	(1)
2013–2014	Scotland	2	(0)
- * Club domestic league appearances and goals

George Jan Boyd (born 2 October 1985) is a former professional footballer. Initially deployed as a left winger, he was later more frequently utilised in an attacking midfield role.

Boyd began his career in the Charlton Athletic youth academy before joining Stevenage Borough of the Football Conference in 2001. He made his first-team debut in 2002 at the age of 17 and scored 32 goals in 126 appearances over five seasons. In January 2007, he signed for Peterborough United for a fee of £260,000, and achieved successive promotions in the 2007–08 and 2008–09 seasons. He spent the latter part of the 2009–10 season on loan at Nottingham Forest, then helped Peterborough secure promotion to the Championship in 2010–11, and joined Hull City on loan for the remainder of 2012–13. The move was made permanent in May 2013, and Boyd's time at Hull included an FA Cup final appearance in May 2014.

In September 2014, Boyd signed for Premier League club Burnley, where he recorded the highest average distance covered per match in the league during the 2014–15 season and helped the club gain promotion back to the Premier League in 2015–16. He later played for Sheffield Wednesday and returned to Peterborough for the 2019–20 season. After a brief spell at Salford City, he retired from professional football in October 2021 and returned semi-professionally in 2023 with Wythenshawe Town, contributing to their promotion in 2023–24. Internationally, Boyd represented the England National Game XI between 2005 and 2006 and, being eligible for Scotland through his maternal grandfather, he earned two senior caps between 2013 and 2014.

== Early life ==
Born in Chatham, Kent, Boyd grew up in Kent. He combined a course at North Hertfordshire College with playing football. During this period, Boyd worked in a sweet shop at Hitchin railway station to earn money for his train fare to training sessions.

== Club career ==
=== Stevenage Borough ===
Boyd began his career as part of Charlton Athletic's youth system at the age of 10. He was released by Charlton at the age of 15 and briefly represented Chatham Town's under-18 team in the Kent Youth League. Following his release, Boyd was offered youth contracts by Bristol City, Farnborough Town and Stevenage Borough, ultimately opting to join Football Conference club Stevenage on a two-year scholarship in 2001. He made his Stevenage debut at the age of 17 during the 2002–03 season, playing the first half in a 3–1 defeat against Margate at Broadhall Way on 14 December 2002. Boyd did not play again for the first team that season. The following season, Boyd made 11 appearances during the second half of the season under new manager Graham Westley, having impressed during his involvement in the FA Youth Cup. Boyd made an impact as a second-half substitute in matches towards the end of that season, assisting all three of Stevenage's goals in a 3–1 victory over Tamworth, as well as scoring his first senior goal in a 2–1 win against Northwich Victoria in April 2004.

As a result of his form during the latter stages of the 2003–04 season, Boyd became a regular in the first team the following season, making 37 appearances and scoring three times as Stevenage reached the Conference National play-offs. His first goal of the 2004–05 season came in a 4–1 victory against Northwich Victoria, scoring Stevenage's second just before half-time. Boyd was sent off for the first time in his career in a match against Canvey Island, receiving a straight red card. During the 2005–06 season, he began the season with three goals in five games, scoring twice against Woking in a 3–2 defeat and once against Tamworth. He signed a new three-year contract with the club on 11 November 2005. Over the course of the season, Boyd scored 12 times in 47 matches from midfield in all competitions.

Under the new management of Mark Stimson ahead of the 2006–07 season, Boyd was deployed in a more central role for the first time in a 2–1 defeat away to Tamworth on 2 September 2006, a match in which he scored Stevenage's only goal. In the club's next fixture, he scored his first competitive hat-trick in a 6–0 win against Stafford Rangers. Boyd scored four goals in a 7–0 victory over Merthyr Tydfil in the FA Trophy on 9 December 2006. Later that month, Stevenage rejected an initial offer from Peterborough United for Boyd, but on 31 December both parties agreed a deal, and Boyd officially signed for Peterborough on 8 January 2007 for a record Football Conference transfer fee of £260,000. He made his last appearance for Stevenage the day after the agreement was reached, scoring twice in a 3–2 victory over Aldershot Town on 1 January 2007. During the first half of the 2006–07 season, Boyd scored 15 goals in 27 matches in all competitions. During his time at Stevenage, Boyd earned the nickname "the White Pelé".

=== Peterborough United ===
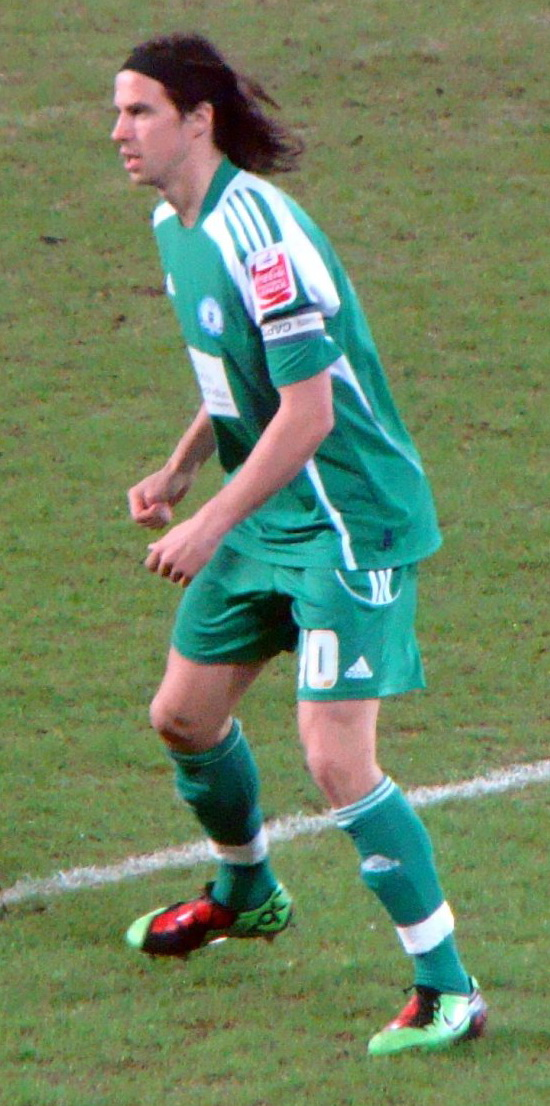
Boyd playing for Peterborough United in 2010

Boyd made his debut for Peterborough United in a 3–1 defeat away to Darlington on 13 January 2007, and scored his first goal for the club a month later, in a 3–0 victory against Wrexham on 10 February 2007. He came off the substitutes' bench to score Peterborough's equaliser in a 1–1 draw at home to Boston United, a "superb 35-yard volley". He scored six times for the club during the second half of the 2006–07 season, making 20 appearances, including two goals on the final day of the season in a 3–3 draw with Rochdale. The following season, Boyd was a regular in the team as Peterborough secured promotion to League One, scoring 15 times in 53 appearances. During the season, he registered his second professional hat-trick in an 8–2 win over Accrington Stanley, and was subsequently named in the League Two PFA Team of the Year for the 2007–08 season. He scored 10 times in 53 matches in all competitions during the 2008–09 season, as Peterborough achieved back-to-back promotions to the Championship. Boyd was named in the League One PFA Team of the Year for the second consecutive season.

Boyd played in Peterborough's opening match of the 2009–10 season, marking his first appearance in the second tier of English football, and scored from the penalty spot in a 2–1 defeat to Derby County at Pride Park. Boyd made a club record-equalling 124th consecutive appearance on 17 October 2009, scoring a last-minute equaliser against Bristol City at Ashton Gate. He subsequently broke the record three days later in a match against Doncaster Rovers, before scoring twice in the following match against Scunthorpe United. Following the appointment of Mark Cooper as manager, Boyd was made team captain in January 2010. Peterborough stated that they had rejected a transfer bid for Boyd from fellow Championship club Middlesbrough during the January transfer window. The following day, Peterborough United director of football Barry Fry confirmed that Middlesbrough were in transfer negotiations for Boyd, although the two clubs ultimately failed to agree a fee. Boyd scored 12 goals in 37 appearances during the 2009–10 season.

==== Nottingham Forest loan ====
After Boyd's proposed move to Middlesbrough fell through, he joined fellow Championship club Nottingham Forest on loan on 2 March 2010, in an agreement lasting until the end of the 2009–10 season. Peterborough chairman Darragh MacAnthony described the transfer as "one of the worst moments in his time at London Road". Boyd made his debut for Forest in a 1–0 victory over Swansea City on 6 March 2010, playing the full match. He struggled for first-team appearances during his loan spell, and although it had been expected that the move would be made permanent in the summer, new Peterborough manager Gary Johnson stated "there's every chance" Boyd could return to his parent club. Boyd was named in Forest's starting eleven for the first time in almost a month on the last day of the club's regular season, playing in a 2–2 draw away to Scunthorpe United and scoring Forest's second goal. That proved to be Boyd's last appearance of the season for Forest, as he did not play in the club's unsuccessful play-off campaign. He made six appearances during his time at the club, scoring one goal. In 2020, Boyd stated that he had been signed by Forest's director of football, David Pleat, and was not wanted by manager Billy Davies.

==== Return to Peterborough ====
Boyd returned to his parent club ahead of the 2010–11 season, with Peterborough competing in League One following the club's relegation from the Championship the previous season. Boyd agreed a new three-year contract with Peterborough on 10 July 2010. He scored in Peterborough's first match of the 2010–11 season, a 3–0 win against Bristol Rovers on 7 August 2010. He scored five goals in five matches across February and March 2011, scoring once against Colchester United, followed by braces against Exeter City and Carlisle United. Boyd missed the chance to complete his hat-trick in the latter fixture when he missed a 90th-minute penalty. Boyd played in all three of Peterborough's play-off fixtures, which included the full match in the 2011 League One play-off final at Old Trafford, where Peterborough defeated Huddersfield Town 3–0 to secure promotion back to the Championship. During the season, Boyd scored 17 goals in 51 appearances.

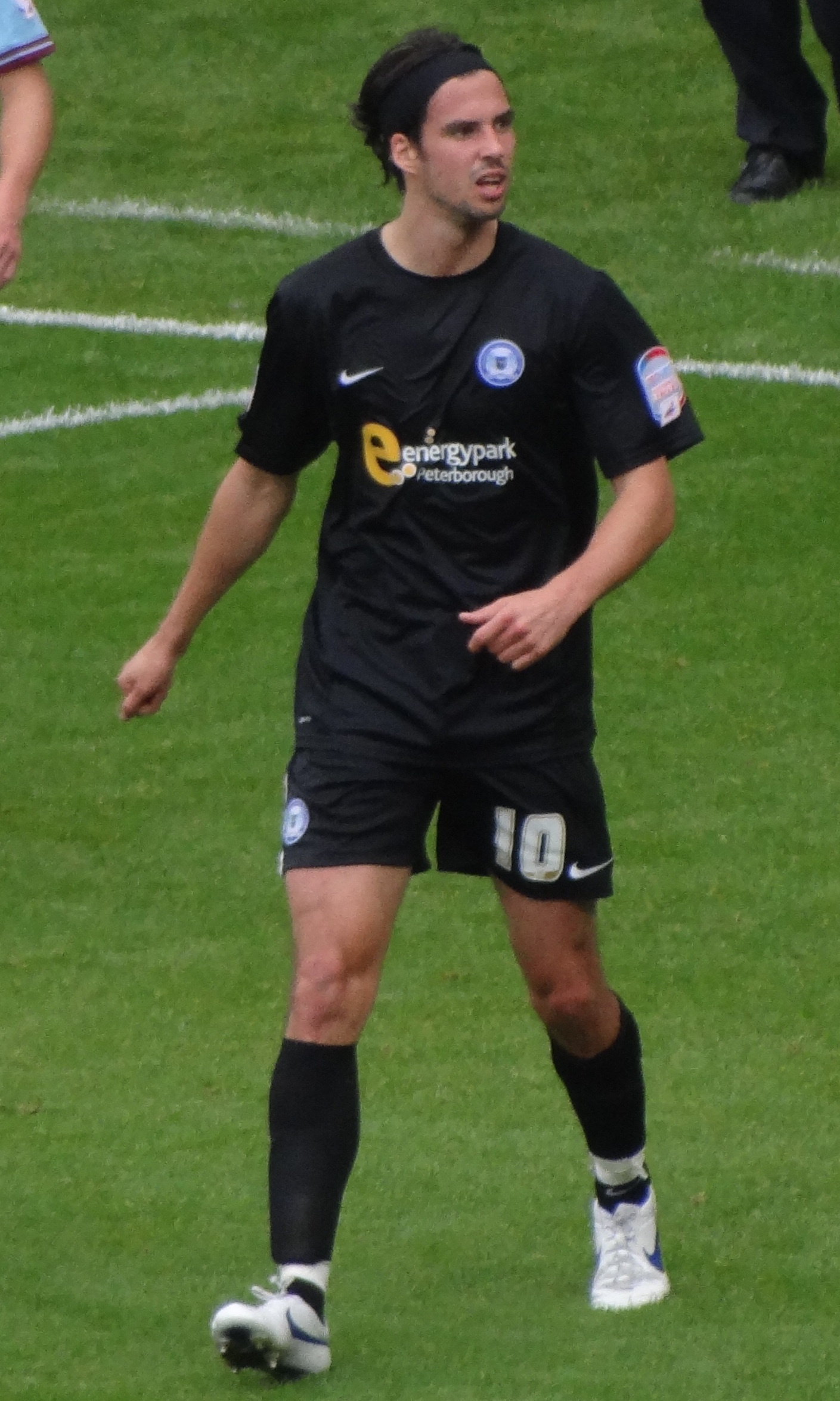
Boyd playing for Peterborough United in 2011

Ahead of the 2011–12 season, Peterborough rejected two bids for Boyd from Burnley. He played in the club's first match of the season on 6 August 2011, a 2–1 victory over Crystal Palace on their return to the second tier of English football. He scored eight times during the season, making 48 appearances in all competitions, as Peterborough consolidated their position in the Championship. At the end of that season, Boyd declined the offer of a contract extension, with one year remaining on his existing deal. Consequently, he was placed on the transfer list in line with the club's updated transfer policy. Boyd remained transfer-listed for the remainder of his time at Peterborough. Despite this, he continued to feature regularly, opening the 2012–13 season by scoring twice in his first three appearances. In October 2012, Boyd scored his fourth and fifth goals of the season in a 3–1 home win over Huddersfield Town on 23 October 2012. His second goal during the match was a dipping volley from just inside the Huddersfield half, described as "world-class".

In January 2013, Peterborough rejected a transfer bid from Nottingham Forest for Boyd, which chairman Darragh MacAnthony described as "derisory". Eight clubs expressed interest in Boyd during the transfer window. Peterborough accepted an offer from fellow Championship club Crystal Palace on 29 January 2013, followed by improved bids from several Championship clubs, including Nottingham Forest, who met Peterborough's £500,000 valuation. Boyd agreed terms with Forest on 31 January 2013, only for the club to withdraw from the deal two hours before the transfer deadline, citing a failed medical due to an "inconclusive eye test". Peterborough's Director of football Barry Fry criticised Nottingham Forest's owners for pulling out of the deal, and chairman MacAnthony commented: "He's played 300 matches and scored from the halfway line the other month, but Forest say he has an eyesight problem. Alex McLeish wanted to sign him. It's the most ridiculous thing that's happened to me." Speaking in 2020, Boyd stated that he had chosen Nottingham Forest over his childhood club Crystal Palace as he was looking to settle in the East Midlands following the birth of his child. He alleged that the failed medical at Forest was influenced by manager Billy Davies, who had not picked him during his 2010 loan, and who was due to return to the City Ground. Boyd said that he was made to take an eye test without his contact lenses.

Peterborough subsequently stated that, with Boyd's contract expiring in the summer, they would be prepared to offer him a new contract or let him leave on loan when the emergency loan window opened, with at least one club having indicated interest in signing him on a loan agreement.

=== Hull City ===
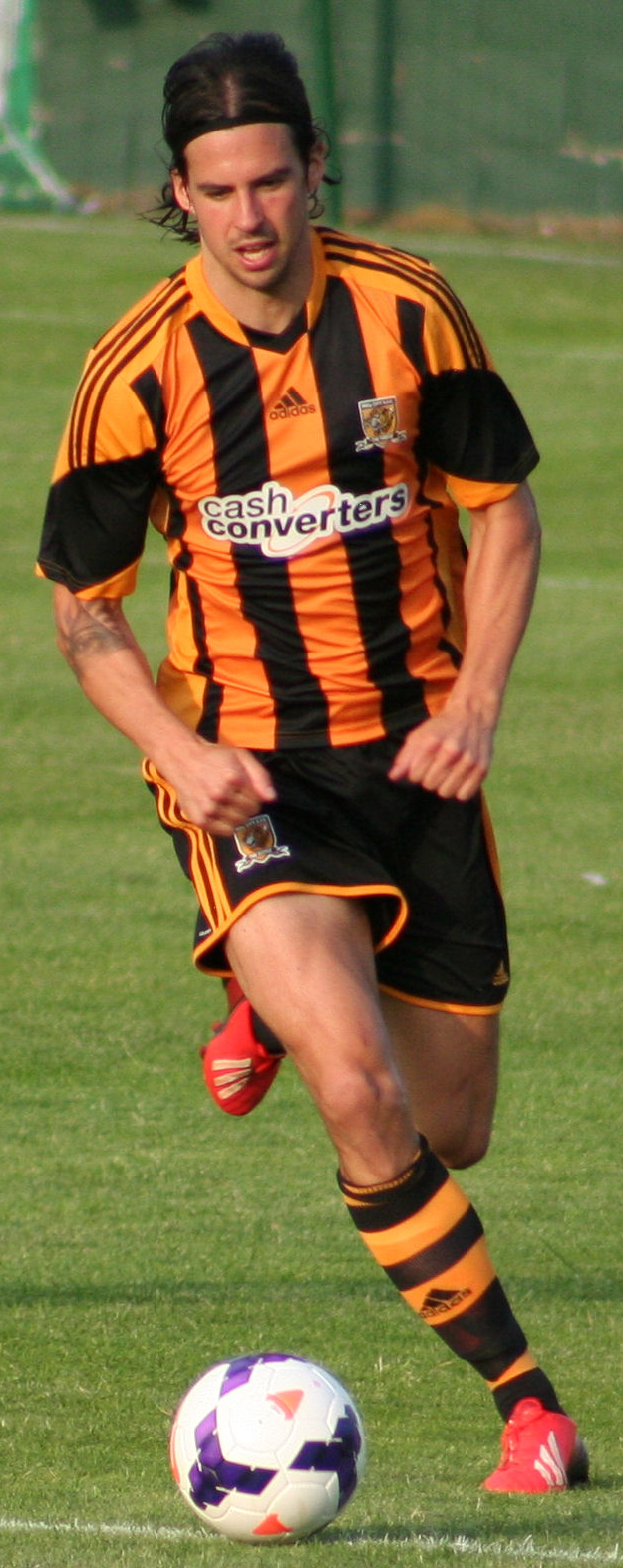
Boyd playing for Hull City in 2013

Boyd subsequently joined Championship club Hull City on loan until the end of the 2012–13 season on 21 February 2013, with a view to a permanent move. He made his debut two days after signing, coming on as a second-half substitute for Robert Koren in a 4–1 away defeat to Bolton Wanderers. Boyd's full debut came at home in the following match a week later, during which he scored twice in a 5–2 victory over Birmingham City on 2 March 2013. After the performance, Hull manager Steve Bruce stated: "It was a wonder show. His work-rate and intelligence, he looked the real deal. I've always been a big admirer, but I didn't know he was that good. If he can keep performing like that, then we've got some player on our hands". He played regularly for the remainder of the season, including in Hull's 2–2 home draw with Cardiff City on the last day of the season, the match that ultimately secured the club's promotion back to the Premier League. During his loan spell, Boyd made 13 appearances and scored four times.

He signed for Hull on a permanent basis on 28 May 2013, joining on a two-year contract. He made his Premier League debut on the opening day of the 2013–14 season when he came off the substitutes' bench in a 2–0 defeat against Chelsea at Stamford Bridge. Boyd scored his first goal of the season, which was also his first in the top tier of English football, in Hull's 6–0 home win against Fulham on 28 December 2013. He scored the only goal of the game with a header as Hull secured a 1–0 win against Swansea City on 5 April 2014; the victory helped move Hull "a substantial step closer to securing their Premier League status for another season". Boyd also played in all seven of Hull's FA Cup matches that season, culminating in an appearance as a substitute in a 3–2 extra-time loss to Arsenal in the 2014 FA Cup final at Wembley Stadium on 17 May 2014. Boyd made 39 appearances for Hull during the season, scoring twice.

Boyd remained at Hull for the start of the 2014–15 season and started in Hull's first appearance in a major European competition, also making his European debut, in a 1–0 first-leg play-off round defeat away to Lokeren on 21 August 2014. The start proved to be one of two appearances for Hull during the opening month of the season as manager Steve Bruce stated Boyd was nearing a move to fellow Premier League club Burnley. Ahead of the move being confirmed, Bruce stated "I wish him well. I've been in the game a long time and if all professional footballers were like George Boyd my job would be easy". During his year-and-a-half stay at Hull, Boyd made 54 appearances and scored six goals.

=== Burnley ===
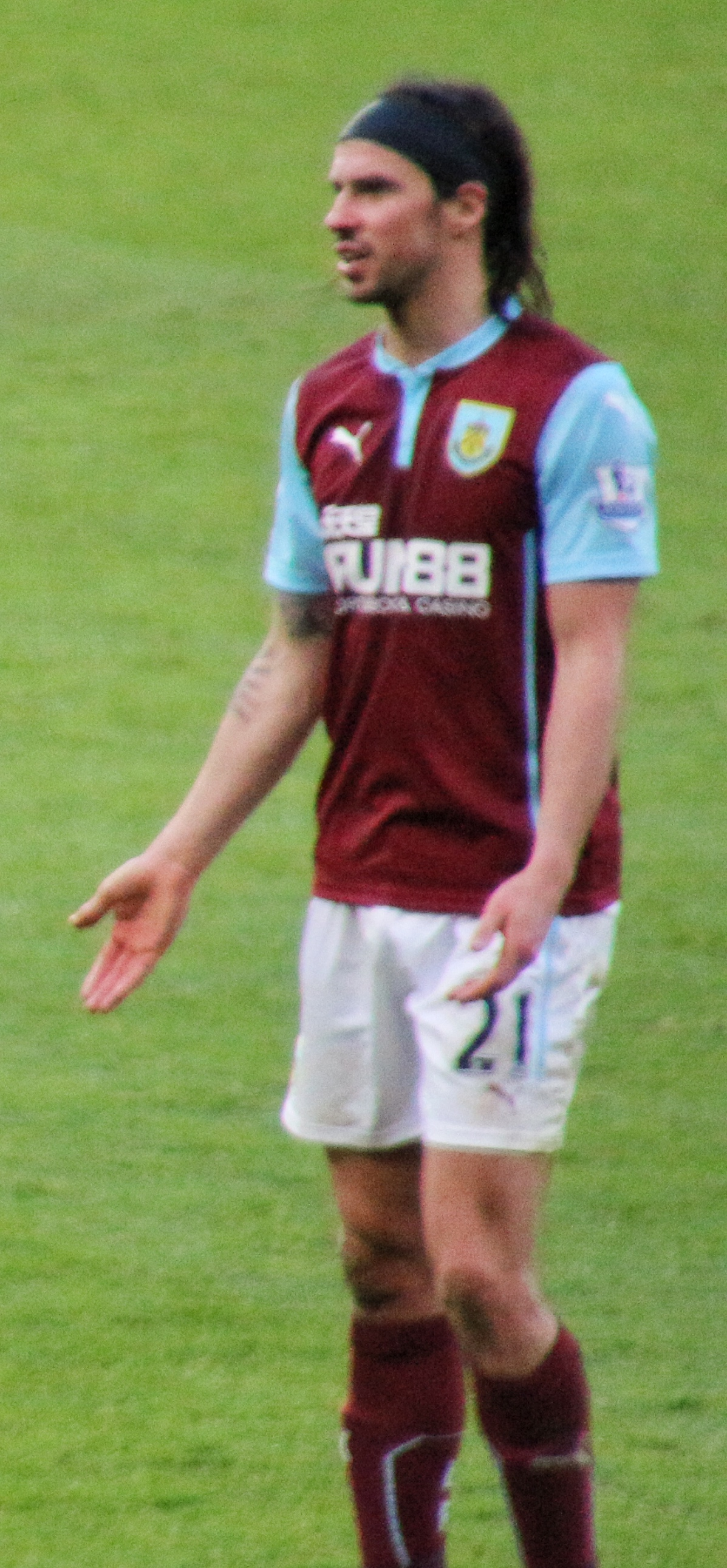
Boyd playing for Burnley in 2015

The move to Burnley was confirmed on 1 September 2014, with Boyd signing for an undisclosed fee "believed to be in the region of £3 million" and on a three-year contract. He made his debut in a 0–0 draw against Crystal Palace at Selhurst Park on 13 September 2014, playing the whole match. Boyd scored his first goal for Burnley in the club's 3–1 defeat to West Ham United at Turf Moor on 18 October 2014, briefly halving the deficit when he reacted quickest to convert Michael Kightly's cross. Boyd scored against Manchester City on 14 March 2015, his fifth goal of the season, when he "arrowed in a low half-volley" to secure a 1–0 victory. He made 37 appearances during the season, scoring five times, as his first season at the club ended in relegation back to the Championship. Boyd finished the season having covered an average of 7.45 miles per game, the highest average distance of any player in the Premier League that season. He was voted Burnley's Player of the Year at the end of the season, which Boyd described as a "great honour".

Boyd remained at Burnley for the 2015–16 season back in the Championship, starting in the opening-day 1–1 draw away to Leeds United. He scored once during the first half of the season, scoring the winning goal in a 2–1 home victory against Milton Keynes Dons on 15 September 2015, a win that helped Burnley secure their fourth successive league victory. Boyd's first-half goal in Burnley's 2–1 away win at Birmingham City on 16 April 2016 helped move the club to within two points of the top of the Championship. Burnley secured the Championship title following a 3–0 away victory at already relegated Charlton Athletic on the final day of the season, with Boyd scoring the second goal of the match when he "smashed the ball home from eight yards" shortly after half-time. He made 47 appearances and scored five goals as Burnley returned to the Premier League at the first attempt.

Boyd started in Burnley's first match back in the top flight to open the 2016–17 season, playing the entire game in a 1–0 home defeat to Swansea City. His running statistics were once again highlighted during the season, as he had run 58.3 miles in Burnley's opening seven fixtures, five per cent more than Jordan Henderson, who was in second place. He scored his first goal of the season in a 3–2 home victory against AFC Bournemouth on 10 December 2016. Boyd also scored in Burnley's 1–0 victory against Stoke City on 4 April 2017, ending a run of seven games without a win. He played in 36 of Burnley's 38 Premier League fixtures that season as they secured safety with a 16th-place finish, scoring twice. Boyd entered contract discussions with Burnley in April 2017, with his existing deal set to expire in the summer. Further negotiations took place in May; however, no contract extension was ultimately agreed. He made 123 appearances during his three-year tenure at the club, scoring 12 goals.

=== Sheffield Wednesday ===
Boyd subsequently signed for Championship club Sheffield Wednesday on a free transfer on 3 July 2017, joining on a two-year deal running until 2019. Despite dropping down a division to the Championship, Boyd described the move as a "no-brainer". He made his debut for Sheffield Wednesday on the opening day of the 2017–18 season, playing the first 67 minutes in a 1–0 defeat away to Preston North End. Boyd sustained a shoulder injury in September 2017 that was initially described as "nothing serious", but ultimately required two separate surgeries and kept him out of the first team for four months. He returned on 6 January 2018, playing 68 minutes in a 0–0 draw against Carlisle United in the FA Cup. Boyd scored his first goal for Sheffield Wednesday in a 3–1 victory over Reading at Hillsborough on 26 January 2018. He made 25 appearances during the injury-disrupted season, scoring three times. Having made the same number of appearances during the 2018–19 season, Boyd was released by Sheffield Wednesday on 5 May 2019.

=== Return to Peterborough United ===
Without a club ahead of the 2019–20 season, Boyd signed a two-year contract with former club Peterborough United, competing in League One, on 15 July 2019. Boyd started in the club's first match of the season, a 3–1 home defeat to Fleetwood Town on 3 August 2019, and went on to make 24 appearances that season. Owing to a new £2.5 million salary cap imposed on all League One teams, Boyd was placed on the transfer list by Peterborough on 28 August 2020. A month later, director of football Barry Fry stated he was "astonished" that the club had received no offers for Boyd. Boyd made his only appearance for Peterborough during the 2020–21 season on 6 October 2020, scoring in a 4–2 EFL Trophy victory against Fulham under-21s. He was released by the club on 13 October 2020, with Boyd stating he was "gutted" his time at Peterborough had concluded, and expressed frustration at not being able to play due to the new salary constraints.

=== Salford City ===
After his departure from Peterborough, Boyd signed a contract with League Two club Salford City on 3 November 2020, with the agreement running for the remainder of the 2020–21 season. He made his Salford debut on the same day as his signing was announced, coming on as a 70th-minute substitute in a 2–1 away defeat to Cambridge United. Boyd played 13 times during his time at Salford, leaving the club upon the expiry of his contract in June 2021. In his last game for the club, a 3–0 win against Leyton Orient, Boyd missed a penalty that would have given Salford the lead.

=== Wythenshawe Town ===
Boyd announced his retirement from playing professional football on 28 October 2021. Two years later, in December 2023, he returned to playing at semi-professional level, joining Wythenshawe Town of the North West Counties League Premier Division, the ninth tier of the English football league system. He scored nine league goals in 19 appearances during the second half of the 2023–24 season, as the club achieved promotion via the North West Counties League Premier Division play-offs following a 3–2 penalty shootout victory against Bury in the final on 4 May 2024. Boyd remained at Wythenshawe Town for the 2024–25 season and scored 17 goals in 48 appearances in all competitions, finishing as the club's top goalscorer that season. He did not play semi-professional football after the season, although he continued to represent the club's veterans team, which included several former Premier League players.

== International career ==
=== England C ===
Boyd was called up to the England C team, who represent England at non-League level, in October 2005, and played in a European Challenge Trophy match against Belgium under-23s. He subsequently played in two more matches in the same competition, including against Italy in February 2006. He scored his first goal for England C in a 4–1 win against a Netherlands XI on 29 November 2006, in the final match of the competition.

=== Scotland ===
After obtaining documentary proof that his maternal grandfather was born in Motherwell, Boyd received a call-up to the Scotland B team on 30 April 2009. He started and scored in a 3–0 victory against a Northern Ireland B team, in a performance described as containing "flair and commitment". Boyd received his first call-up to the senior team on 7 March 2013, when he was named in manager Gordon Strachan's squad for the 2014 FIFA World Cup qualifiers against Wales and Serbia. He earned his first senior cap in a 2–0 away defeat to Serbia on 26 March 2013. Boyd started the match, playing the whole game at the Karađorđe Stadium in Novi Sad.

== Style of play ==
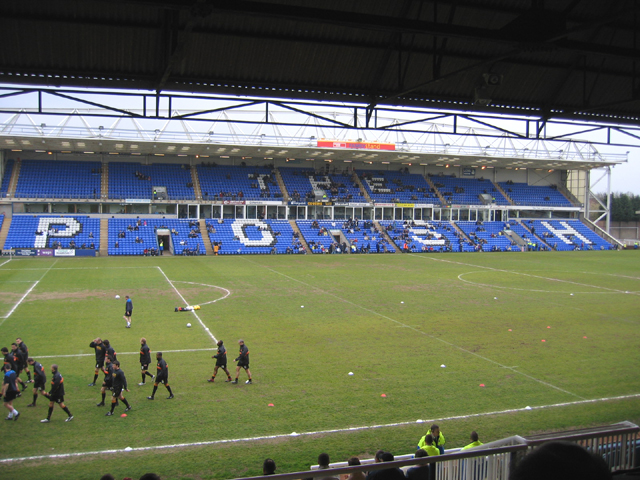
Boyd recorded more than 50 assists for Peterborough United during his time at London Road.

Initially deployed as a winger, Boyd subsequently played in central midfield and attacking midfield positions. He predominantly operated on the left side but was also used in a free role behind the forwards, including in a 3–4–1–2 formation under Peterborough United manager Jim Gannon. He preferred to play "in the hole", a position he felt afforded him more time on the ball. Predominantly left-footed, Boyd scored most of his goals with his left foot, although he was also comfortable using his right.

During his time at Stevenage, Boyd was nicknamed "the White Pelé" for his use of tricks and flair. He was noted for his creativity and recorded more than 50 assists for Peterborough. He also had a tendency to score from long range, including from inside the opposition half against Huddersfield Town. In the 2014–15 season, Boyd's running statistics received significant coverage following the introduction of the Premier League's statistical analysis system. He covered an average of 7.45 miles per match, the highest recorded by any Premier League player that season.

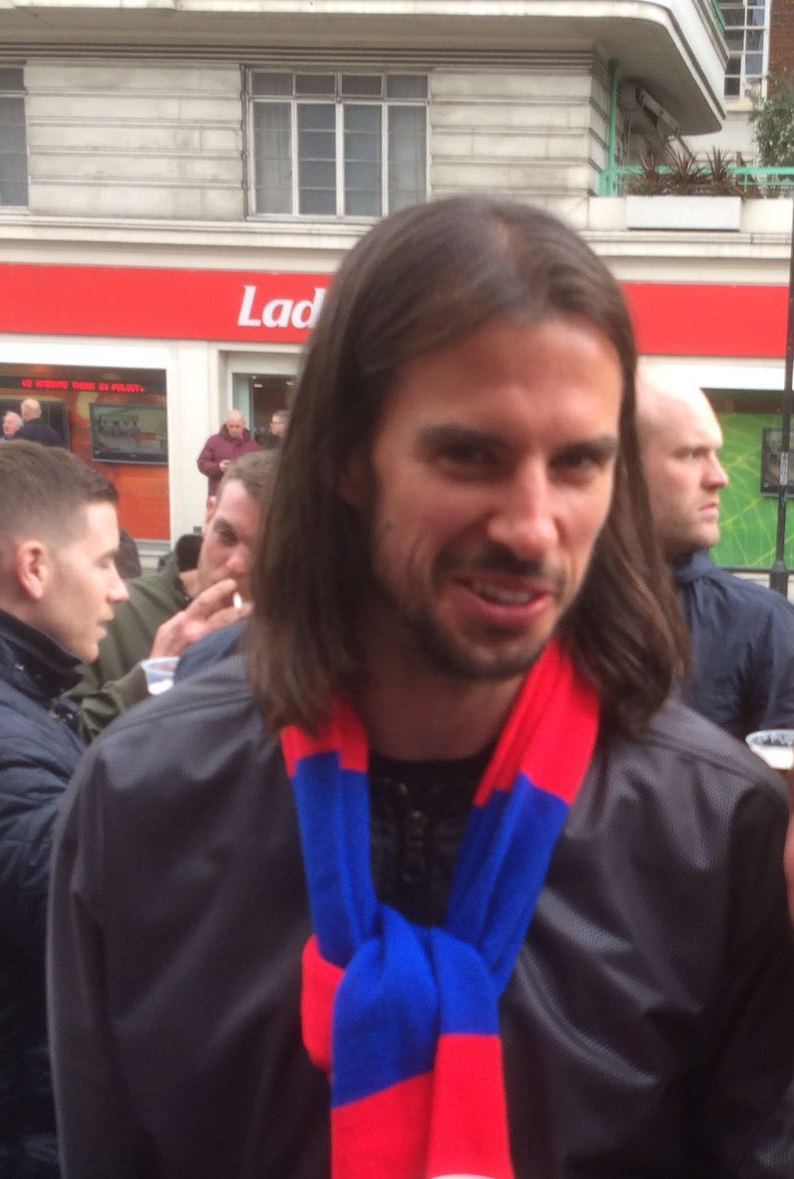
Boyd in Crystal Palace colours before the 2016 FA Cup semi-final

== Personal life ==
Boyd has three children. He supports Crystal Palace, whom he used to watch regularly, and states former Palace striker Chris Armstrong was a player he aspired to play like.

== Career statistics ==
=== Club ===
Appearances and goals by club, season and competition
Club	Season	League			FA Cup		League Cup		Other		Total	
Club	Season	Division	Apps	Goals	Apps	Goals	Apps	Goals	Apps	Goals	Apps	Goals
Stevenage Borough	2002–03	Football Conference	1	0	0	0	—		0	0	1	0
Stevenage Borough	2003–04	Conference National	11	1	0	0	—		0	0	11	1
Stevenage Borough	2004–05	Conference National	32	2	3	1	—		3 (Note: Appearances in 2005 Conference National play-offs)	0	38	3
Stevenage Borough	2005–06	Conference National	42	10	4	2	—		2 (Note: One appearance in Football League Trophy; one appearance in FA Trophy)	0	48	12
Stevenage Borough	2006–07	Conference National	25	11	2	1	—		1 (Note: Appearance in FA Trophy)	4	28	16
Stevenage Borough	Total		111	24	9	4	0	0	6	4	126	32
Peterborough United	2006–07	League Two	20	6	—		—		—		20	6
Peterborough United	2007–08	League Two	46	12	4	1	1	1	2 (Note: Appearance(s) in Football League Trophy)	1	53	15
Peterborough United	2008–09	League One	46	9	5	0	1	1	1	0	53	10
Peterborough United	2009–10	Championship	32	9	1	0	4	3	—		37	12
Peterborough United	2010–11	League One	43	15	2	0	3	2	4 (Note: One appearance in Football League Trophy; three appearances in 2011 League One play-offs)	0	52	17
Peterborough United	2011–12	Championship	45	7	1	0	2	1	—		48	8
Peterborough United	2012–13	Championship	31	6	1	0	2	1	0	0	34	7
Peterborough United	Total		263	64	14	1	13	9	7	1	297	75
Nottingham Forest (loan)	2009–10	Championship	6	1	—		—		—		6	1
Hull City (loan)	2012–13	Championship	13	4	—		—		—		13	4
Hull City	2013–14	Premier League	29	2	7	0	3	0	—		39	2
Hull City	2014–15	Premier League	1	0	—		0	0	1 (Note: Appearance in Europa League)	0	2	0
Hull City	Total		43	6	7	0	3	0	1	0	54	6
Burnley	2014–15	Premier League	35	5	2	0	—		—		37	5
Burnley	2015–16	Championship	44	5	2	0	1	0	—		47	5
Burnley	2016–17	Premier League	36	2	2	0	1	0	—		39	2
Burnley	Total		115	12	6	0	2	0	0	0	123	12
Sheffield Wednesday	2017–18	Championship	20	2	5	1	0	0	—		25	3
Sheffield Wednesday	2018–19	Championship	20	1	3	0	2	0	—		25	1
Sheffield Wednesday	Total		40	3	8	1	2	0	0	0	50	4
Peterborough United	2019–20	League One	22	0	1	0	1	0	0	0	24	0
Peterborough United	2020–21	League One	0	0	0	0	0	0	1 (Note: Appearance in EFL Trophy)	1	1	1
Peterborough United	Total		22	0	1	0	1	0	1	1	25	1
Salford City	2020–21	League Two	11	0	2	0	0	0	—		13	0
Wythenshawe Town	2023–24	NWCL Premier Division	17	9	—		—		2 (Note: Appearances in 2024 North West Counties League Premier Division play-offs)	0	19	9
Wythenshawe Town	2024–25	NPL Division One West	38	14	7	3	—		3 (Note: Two appearances in FA Trophy; one appearance in Manchester Premier Cup)	0	48	17
Wythenshawe Town	Total		55	23	7	3	0	0	5	0	67	26
Career total			666	133	54	9	21	9	20	6	761	155

=== International ===
Appearances and goals by national team and year
National team	Year	Apps	Goals
Scotland	2013	1	0
Scotland	2014	1	0
Total		2	0

== Honours ==
Peterborough United

- Football League One runner-up: 2008–09; play-offs: 2011
- Football League Two runner-up: 2007–08

Hull City

- Football League Championship runner-up: 2012–13
- FA Cup runner-up: 2013–14

Burnley

- Football League Championship: 2015–16

Individual

- PFA Team of the Year: 2007–08 League Two, 2008–09 League One
- Burnley Player of the Year: 2014–15

== See also ==
- List of Scotland international footballers born outside Scotland
