= List of English football transfers summer 2009 =

This is a list of English football transfers for the 2009 summer transfer window. Only moves featuring at least one Premier League or Championship club are listed.

The summer transfer window opened on 1 July 2009 and closed at 17:00 BST on 1 September 2009. Players without a club could join one at any time, either during or in between transfer windows. Clubs outside the Premier League could also sign players on loan at any time. If need be, clubs could sign a goalkeeper on an emergency loan, if all others were unavailable.

== Transfers ==
Date	Name	Moving from	Moving to	Fee
9 February 2009	Dimitrios Konstantopoulos	Coventry City	Cardiff City	Loan
10 February 2009	Tony Kane	Blackburn Rovers	Carlisle United	Loan
10 February 2009	Jason Shackell	Wolverhampton Wanderers	Norwich City	Loan
10 February 2009	Djimi Traoré	Portsmouth	Birmingham City	Loan
11 February 2009	Terry Dixon	Unattached	West Ham United	Free
11 February 2009	Jai Reason	Ipswich Town	Cambridge United	Loan
12 February 2009	Billy Bingham	Crystal Palace	Dagenham & Redbridge	Loan
12 February 2009	James Henry	Reading	Millwall	Loan
12 February 2009	Seb Hines	Middlesbrough	Oldham Athletic	Loan
13 February 2009	Andrew Davies	Stoke City	Preston North End	Loan
13 February 2009	Lukas Jutkiewicz	Everton	Huddersfield Town	Loan
14 February 2009	Simon Thomas	Crystal Palace	Rotherham United	Loan
17 February 2009	Godwin Antwi	Liverpool	Hereford United	Loan
17 February 2009	Mark Bunn	Blackburn Rovers	Leicester City	Loan
17 February 2009	Jordi López	Unattached	Queens Park Rangers	Free
17 February 2009	Danzelle St Louis-Hamilton	Stoke City	Bristol Rovers	Loan
18 February 2009	Simon Church	Reading	Leyton Orient	Loan
19 February 2009	Lewis Guy	Doncaster Rovers	Hartlepool United	Loan
20 February 2009	Joe Anderson	Fulham	Woking	Loan
20 February 2009	Michail Antonio	Reading	Cheltenham Town	Loan
20 February 2009	Craig Beattie	West Bromwich Albion	Sheffield United	Loan
20 February 2009	Kelvin Bossman	Reading	Woking	Loan
20 February 2009	Fabio Ferreira	Chelsea	Oldham Athletic	Loan
20 February 2009	Carl Fletcher	Crystal Palace	Plymouth Argyle	Loan
20 February 2009	Vincent Péricard	Stoke City	Millwall	Loan
23 February 2009	Stephen Carr	Unattached	Birmingham City	Free
23 February 2009	Ashley Hemmings	Wolverhampton Wanderers	Cheltenham Town	Loan
23 February 2009	Joseph Mills	Southampton	Scunthorpe United	Loan
23 February 2009	Liam Trotter	Ipswich Town	Scunthorpe United	Loan
24 February 2009	David Worrall	West Bromwich Albion	Shrewsbury Town	Loan
24 February 2009	Kevin Gall	Carlisle United	Port Vale	Loan
25 February 2009	Gunnar Nielsen	Unattached	Manchester City	Free
25 February 2009	John-Joe O'Toole	Watford	Sheffield United	Loan
26 February 2009	Steve Kabba	Watford	Oldham Athletic	Loan
26 February 2009	Lewis Montrose	Wigan Athletic	Cheltenham Town	Loan
26 February 2009	Kayode Odejayi	Barnsley	Scunthorpe United	Loan
27 February 2009	Chris Arthur	Queens Park Rangers	Rushden & Diamonds	Loan
27 February 2009	Wayne Henderson	Preston North End	Grimsby Town	Loan
2 March 2009	Danny Butterfield	Crystal Palace	Charlton Athletic	Loan
2 March 2009	Jack Jeffery	West Ham United	Eastbourne Borough	Loan
2 March 2009	Isaiah Osbourne	Aston Villa	Nottingham Forest	Loan
2 March 2009	David Stockdale	Fulham	Leicester City	Loan
2 March 2009	Anthony Stokes	Sunderland	Crystal Palace	Loan
2 March 2009	Gareth Taylor	Doncaster Rovers	Carlisle United	Loan
2 March 2009	Darren Ward	Sunderland	Wolverhampton Wanderers	Loan
3 March 2009	Al Bangura	Watford	Brighton & Hove Albion	Loan
3 March 2009	Nick Blackman	Blackburn Rovers	Blackpool	Loan
3 March 2009	Ulises de la Cruz	Unattached	Birmingham City	Free
3 March 2009	Danny Hutchins	Tottenham Hotspur	Yeovil Town	Loan
5 March 2009	Danny Mayor	Preston North End	Tranmere Rovers	Loan
5 March 2009	Gary McSheffrey	Birmingham City	Nottingham Forest	Loan
5 March 2009	Dave Mooney	Reading	Norwich City	Loan
5 March 2009	Kris Renton	Norwich City	King's Lynn	Loan
6 March 2009	Mikkel Andersen	Reading	Brighton & Hove Albion	Loan
6 March 2009	Gary Borrowdale	Queens Park Rangers	Brighton & Hove Albion	Loan
6 March 2009	David Button	Tottenham Hotspur	Luton Town	Loan
6 March 2009	Jake Cole	Queens Park Rangers	Barnet	Loan
6 March 2009	Paul Marshall	Manchester City	Port Vale	Loan
6 March 2009	Robin Shroot	Birmingham City	Walsall	Loan
8 March 2009	Glen Little	Portsmouth	Reading	Loan
9 March 2009	John Eustace	Watford	Derby County	Loan
9 March 2009	Carl Magnay	Chelsea	Northampton Town	Loan
9 March 2009	Rade Prica	Sunderland	Rosenborg	Undisclosed
9 March 2009	Owain Tudur Jones	Swansea City	Swindon Town	Loan
9 March 2009	Sam Williams	Aston Villa	Brentford	Loan
10 March 2009	Dave Kitson	Stoke City	Reading	Loan
10 March 2009	Håvard Nordtveit	Arsenal	Lillestrøm	Loan
10 March 2009	Paris Simmons	Derby County	Lincoln City	Loan
11 March 2009	Cho Won-Hee	Unattached	Wigan Athletic	Free
12 March 2009	Marlon Broomes	Blackpool	Crewe Alexandra	Loan
12 March 2009	George Donnelly	Skelmersdale United	Plymouth Argyle	Undisclosed
12 March 2009	Chris Gunter	Tottenham Hotspur	Nottingham Forest	Loan
13 March 2009	Mark Byrne	Nottingham Forest	Burton Albion	Loan
13 March 2009	Darren Dennehy	Cardiff City	Hereford United	Loan
13 March 2009	Liam Dickinson	Derby County	Leeds United	Loan
13 March 2009	Giovani Dos Santos	Tottenham Hotspur	Ipswich Town	Loan
13 March 2009	Marek Štěch	West Ham United	Wycombe Wanderers	Loan
13 March 2009	Adel Taarabt	Tottenham Hotspur	Queens Park Rangers	Loan
13 March 2009	Stuart Taylor	Aston Villa	Cardiff City	Loan
13 March 2009	Tony Warner	Hull City	Leicester City	Loan
17 March 2009	Bartosz Białkowski	Southampton	Ipswich Town	Loan
17 March 2009	Alan Mahon	Burnley	Blackpool	Loan
17 March 2009	Aleksandar Prijović	Derby County	Northampton Town	Loan
17 March 2009	Chris Weale	Bristol City	Yeovil Town	Loan
18 March 2009	Shane Supple	Ipswich Town	Oldham Athletic	Loan
19 March 2009	Stuart Fleetwood	Charlton Athletic	Exeter City	Loan
19 March 2009	Alan Lee	Crystal Palace	Norwich City	Loan
19 March 2009	Jonathan Obika	Tottenham Hotspur	Yeovil Town	Loan
19 March 2009	Lee Sawyer	Chelsea	Wycombe Wanderers	Loan
19 March 2009	Andros Townsend	Tottenham Hotspur	Yeovil Town	Loan
19 March 2009	Neal Trotman	Preston North End	Colchester United	Loan
19 March 2009	Iain Turner	Everton	Nottingham Forest	Loan
20 March 2009	Karl Hawley	Preston North End	Colchester United	Loan
20 March 2009	Adam Kay	Burnley	Accrington Stanley	Loan
20 March 2009	Luke Varney	Derby County	Sheffield Wednesday	Loan
21 March 2009	Billy Clarke	Ipswich Town	Brentford	Loan
21 March 2009	Roudolphe Douala	Unattached	Plymouth Argyle	Free
23 March 2009	Frankie Artus	Bristol City	Cheltenham Town	Loan
23 March 2009	Marlon Harewood	Aston Villa	Wolverhampton Wanderers	Loan
24 March 2009	Danny Rose	Tottenham Hotspur	Watford	Loan
24 March 2009	Josh Wright	Charlton Athletic	Gillingham	Loan
25 March 2009	Stephen Gleeson	Wolverhampton Wanderers	Milton Keynes Dons	Loan
25 March 2009	Danny Maguire	Queens Park Rangers	Yeovil Town	Loan
25 March 2009	David Noble	Bristol City	Yeovil Town	Loan
26 March 2009	Astrit Ajdarević	Liverpool	Leicester City	Loan
26 March 2009	James Bennett	Hull City	Lincoln City	Loan
26 March 2009	Yuri Berchiche	Tottenham Hotspur	Cheltenham Town	Loan
26 March 2009	Dexter Blackstock	Queens Park Rangers	Nottingham Forest	Loan
26 March 2009	Darryl Flahavan	Crystal Palace	Leeds United	Loan
26 March 2009	Lee Hughes	Oldham Athletic	Blackpool	Loan
26 March 2009	Jared Hodgkiss	West Bromwich Albion	Northampton Town	Loan
26 March 2009	David Hutton	Tottenham Hotspur	Cheltenham Town	Loan
26 March 2009	Martin Kelly	Liverpool	Huddersfield Town	Loan
26 March 2009	Kazenga LuaLua	Newcastle United	Doncaster Rovers	Loan
26 March 2009	Jennison Myrie-Williams	Bristol City	Hereford United	Loan
26 March 2009	Jason Price	Doncaster Rovers	Millwall	Loan
26 March 2009	Sam Sodje	Reading	Leeds United	Loan
26 March 2009	Graham Stack	Plymouth Argyle	Wolverhampton Wanderders	Loan
26 March 2009	Andrei Stepanov	Unattached	Watford	Free
26 March 2009	Simon Walton	Plymouth Argyle	Blackpool	Loan
26 March 2009	Adam Watts	Fulham	Northampton Town	Loan
26 March 2009	Lee Williamson	Watford	Preston North End	Loan
26 March 2009	Gary Woods	Unattached	Doncaster Rovers	Free
6 April 2009	Ade Akinbiyi	Burnley	Major League Soccer (Houston Dynamo)	Free
15 April 2009	Kyle Davies	Southampton	Major League Soccer (Real Salt Lake)	Free
15 April 2009	Hérita Ilunga	Toulouse	West Ham United	Undisclosed
17 April 2009	Richard Martin	Manchester City	Burton Albion	Loan
24 April 2009	Jack Hobbs	Liverpool	Leicester City	Undisclosed
28 April 2009	Wayne Brown	Hull City	Leicester City	Undisclosed
4 May 2009	Sami Hyypiä	Liverpool	Bayer Leverkusen	Free
11 May 2009	Stephen Dobbie	Queen of the South	Swansea City	Free
11 May 2009	David Hutton	Tottenham Hotspur	Cheltenham Town	Undisclosed
12 May 2009	David Marshall	Norwich City	Cardiff City	Undisclosed
12 May 2009	Tommy Rowe	Stockport County	Peterborough United	Undisclosed
15 May 2009	Lee Frecklington	Lincoln City	Peterborough United	Undisclosed
16 May 2009	Jamie Annerson	Sheffield United	Rotherham United	Free
16 May 2009	Darren Purse	Cardiff City	Sheffield Wednesday	Free
17 May 2009	Tommy Miller	Ipswich Town	Sheffield Wednesday	Free
18 May 2009	Andy Todd	Derby County	Perth Glory	Free
21 May 2009	André Ooijer	Blackburn Rovers	PSV Eindhoven	Free
21 May 2009	Ben Pringle	Ilkeston Town	Derby County	Undisclosed
22 May 2009	Robbie Neilson	Heart of Midlothian	Leicester City	Free
24 May 2009	Aaron Mokoena	Blackburn Rovers	Portsmouth	Free
29 May 2009	Adam Chapman	Sheffield United	Oxford United	£15k
29 May 2009	Chris Weale	Bristol City	Leicester City	Free
2 June 2009	Gareth Barry	Aston Villa	Manchester City	£12m
2 June 2009	Nathan Dyer	Southampton	Swansea City	£400k
2 June 2009	Steven Mouyokolo	Boulogne	Hull City	Undisclosed
2 June 2009	Elrio van Heerden	Club Brugge	Blackburn Rovers	Free
3 June 2009	Christian Benítez	Santos Laguna	Birmingham City	Undisclosed
3 June 2009	David Fox	Blackpool	Colchester United	Free
3 June 2009	Gabor Kiraly	Burnley	1860 Munich	Free
5 June 2009	Liam Hatch	Peterborough United	Luton Town	Loan
9 June 2009	Carl Fletcher	Unattached	Plymouth Argyle	Free
9 June 2009	Peter Štyvar	Bristol City	Skoda Xanthi	Loan
11 June 2009	Mile Sterjovski	Derby County	Perth Glory	Free
12 June 2009	Scott Dann	Coventry City	Birmingham City	Undisclosed
12 June 2009	Nicky Law	Sheffield United	Rotherham United	Free
12 June 2009	Jennison Myrie-Williams	Bristol City	Dundee United	Undisclosed
15 June 2009	Nenad Milijaš	Red Star Belgrade	Wolverhampton Wanderers	Undisclosed
15 June 2009	Heinz Müller	Barnsley	Mainz 05	£600k
15 June 2009	Tommy Fraser	Brighton & Hove Albion	Port Vale	Free
16 June 2009	Stephen Kelly	Birmingham City	Fulham	Undisclosed
16 June 2009	Kyel Reid	Unattached	Sheffield United	Free
16 June 2009	Owain Tudur Jones	Swansea City	Norwich City	£250k
17 June 2009	Toumani Diagouraga	Hereford United	Peterborough United	Undisclosed
17 June 2009	Marcus Hahnemann	Unattached	Wolverhampton Wanderers	Free
17 June 2009	Dean Windass	Hull City	Darlington	Free
18 June 2009	Courtney Cameron	Northampton Town	Aston Villa	Undisclosed
18 June 2009	Lee Williamson	Watford	Sheffield United	Undisclosed
18 June 2009	Onome Sodje	York City	Barnsley	Free
19 June 2009	Jordi Gómez	Espanyol	Wigan Athletic	£1.7m
19 June 2009	Zesh Rehman	Queens Park Rangers	Bradford City	Free
19 June 2009	Djimi Traoré	Portsmouth	AS Monaco	Undisclosed
19 June 2009	Thomas Vermaelen	Ajax	Arsenal	£10m
20 June 2009	Freddie Sears	West Ham United	Crystal Palace	Loan
22 June 2009	Ben Sahar	Chelsea	Espanyol	Free
22 June 2009	Roque Santa Cruz	Blackburn Rovers	Manchester City	£17.5m
22 June 2009	Chris Casement	Ipswich Town	Dundee	Free
22 June 2009	Doug Loft	Brighton & Hove Albion	Port Vale	Free
23 June 2009	Luis Antonio Jiménez	Internazionale	West Ham United	Loan
23 June 2009	Scott Severin	Aberdeen	Watford	Free
23 June 2009	Stuart Taylor	Aston Villa	Manchester City	Undisclosed
23 June 2009	Kenny Lunt	Sheffield Wednesday	Hereford United	Free
24 June 2009	Matt Derbyshire	Blackburn Rovers	Olympiacos	Undisclosed
24 June 2009	Giovanny Espinoza	Barcelona SC	Birmingham City	Undisclosed
24 June 2009	Joe Hart	Manchester City	Birmingham City	Loan
24 June 2009	Lewis Montrose	Wigan Athletic	Wycombe Wanderers	Free
25 June 2009	Ian Breckin	Nottingham Forest	Chesterfield	Undisclosed
25 June 2009	Lee Croft	Norwich City	Derby County	Free
25 June 2009	Roger Johnson	Cardiff City	Birmingham City	£5m
25 June 2009	Mark Yeates	Colchester United	Middlesbrough	Undisclosed
26 June 2009	Scott Flinders	Crystal Palace	Hartlepool United	Free
26 June 2009	Gaël Givet	Marseille	Blackburn Rovers	Undisclosed
26 June 2009	Joe Heath	Nottingham Forest	Lincoln City	Loan
26 June 2009	Glen Johnson	Portsmouth	Liverpool	Undisclosed
26 June 2009	Dany N'Guessan	Lincoln City	Leicester City	Tribunal
29 June 2009	David Clarkson	Motherwell	Bristol City	Undisclosed
29 June 2009	Lars Jacobsen	Everton	Blackburn Rovers	Free
29 June 2009	David McGoldrick	Southampton	Nottingham Forest	Undisclosed
29 June 2009	Abu Ogogo	Arsenal	Dagenham & Redbridge	Free
30 June 2009	Dele Adebola	Bristol City	Nottingham Forest	Free
30 June 2009	Paul Anderson	Liverpool	Nottingham Forest	£250k
30 June 2009	Kevin Doyle	Reading	Wolverhampton Wanderers	Undisclosed
30 June 2009	Steven Fletcher	Hibernian	Burnley	£3m
30 June 2009	Tyrone Mears	Derby County	Burnley	Undisclosed
30 June 2009	Steven Nzonzi	Amiens SC	Blackburn Rovers	Undisclosed
30 June 2009	Antonio Valencia	Wigan Athletic	Manchester United	Undisclosed
1 July 2009	Astrit Ajdarević	Liverpool	Leicester City	Undisclosed
1 July 2009	Andre Blackman	Portsmouth	Bristol City	Undisclosed
1 July 2009	Joe Cobb	Leicester City	Wycombe Wanderers	Free
1 July 2009	Sean Davis	Portsmouth	Bolton Wanderers	Free
1 July 2009	David Edgar	Newcastle United	Burnley	Tribunal
1 July 2009	Dean Gerken	Colchester United	Bristol City	Undisclosed
1 July 2009	Sebastián Leto	Liverpool	Panathinaikos	£3.3m
1 July 2009	Scott Murray	Bristol City	Yeovil Town	Free
1 July 2009	Kyel Reid	West Ham United	Sheffield United	Free
1 July 2009	Cristiano Ronaldo	Manchester United	Real Madrid	£80m
2 July 2009	Darren Ambrose	Charlton Athletic	Crystal Palace	Free
2 July 2009	Damien Delaney	Queens Park Rangers	Ipswich Town	Undisclosed
2 July 2009	Danny Graham	Carlisle United	Watford	Tribunal
2 July 2009	Mark Hudson	Charlton Athletic	Cardiff City	Undisclosed
2 July 2009	Chris Neal	Preston North End	Shrewsbury Town	Free
2 July 2009	Hendry Thomas	Olimpia	Wigan Athletic	Undisclosed
2 July 2009	Ross Turnbull	Middlesbrough	Chelsea	Free
2 July 2009	Emanuel Villa	Derby County	Cruz Azul	Undisclosed
3 July 2009	Lee Camp	Queens Park Rangers	Nottingham Forest	Undisclosed
3 July 2009	Greg Halford	Sunderland	Wolverhampton Wanaderers	Undisclosed
3 July 2009	Lee Martin	Manchester United	Ipswich Town	Undisclosed
3 July 2009	Michael Owen	Unattached	Manchester United	Free
3 July 2009	Rodrigo Possebon	Manchester United	Braga	Loan
3 July 2009	Alfie Potter	Peterborough United	Oxford United	Loan
3 July 2009	Theo Robinson	Watford	Huddersfield Town	Undisclosed
3 July 2009	Daniel Sturridge	Manchester City	Chelsea	Tribunal
4 July 2009	Michael Chopra	Sunderland	Cardiff City	£3m
4 July 2009	Paul Quinn	Motherwell	Cardiff City	£300k
6 July 2009	Hamza Bencherif	Nottingham Forest	Macclesfield Town	Free
6 July 2009	Danny Coyne	Tranmere Rovers	Middlesbrough	Free
6 July 2009	Paul Hartley	Celtic	Bristol City	Free
6 July 2009	Michael O'Connor	Crewe Alexandra	Scunthorpe United	£250k
6 July 2009	Shane Redmond	Nottingham Forest	Burton Albion	Loan
6 July 2009	Josh Wright	Charlton Athletic	Scunthorpe United	Free
6 July 2009	Yuri Zhirkov	CSKA Moscow	Chelsea	Undisclosed
6 July 2009	Ronald Zubar	Marseille	Wolverhampton Wanderers	Undisclosed
7 July 2009	James Reid	Nottingham Forest	Rushden & Diamonds	Loan
7 July 2009	Richie Wellens	Doncaster Rovers	Leicester City	Undisclosed
7 July 2009	Kris Taylor	Unattached	Port Vale	Free
8 July 2009	Lee Bowyer	Unattached	Birmingham City	Undisclosed
8 July 2009	Simon Cox	Swindon Town	West Bromwich Albion	£1.5m
8 July 2009	Alan Mahon	Burnley	Tranmere Rovers	Free
8 July 2009	Gabriel Obertan	Bordeaux	Manchester United	Undisclosed
8 July 2009	Lewis Price	Derby County	Brentford	Loan
8 July 2009	Didier Zokora	Tottenham Hotspur	Sevilla	Undisclosed
9 July 2009	Rob Jones	Hibernian	Scunthorpe United	Undisclosed
9 July 2009	Jack Lampe	Harlow Town	West Ham United	Free
10 July 2009	Yala Bolasie	Plymouth Argyle	Barnet	Loan
10 July 2009	Adam Boyes	York City	Scunthorpe United	Undisclosed
10 July 2009	Michael Duberry	Reading	Wycombe Wanderers	Free
10 July 2009	Gelson Fernandes	Manchester City	Saint-Étienne	Undisclosed
10 July 2009	Jô	Manchester City	Everton	Loan
10 July 2009	Youssouf Mulumbu	Paris Saint-Germain	West Bromwich Albion	£175k
10 July 2009	Darren Potter	Wolverhampton Wanderers	Sheffield Wednesday	Undisclosed
10 July 2009	Jimmy Smith	Chelsea	Leyton Orient	Free
11 July 2009	Fraizer Campbell	Manchester United	Sunderland	£3.5m
11 July 2009	Chris Mavinga	Paris Saint-Germain	Liverpool	Undisclosed
12 July 2009	Paul Robinson	West Bromwich Albion	Bolton Wanderers	Loan
13 July 2009	Paulo da Silva	Deportivo Toluca	Sunderland	Undisclosed
13 July 2009	Danny Haynes	Ipswich Town	Bristol City	Undisclosed
13 July 2009	Josh O'Keefe	Blackburn Rovers	Walsall	Undisclosed
13 July 2009	John Welsh	Hull City	Tranmere Rovers	Free
14 July 2009	Jermaine Easter	Plymouth Argyle	Milton Keynes Dons	Undisclosed
14 July 2009	Brian Easton	Hamilton Academical	Burnley	£350k
14 July 2009	Lewin Nyatanga	Derby County	Bristol City	Undisclosed
14 July 2009	Lee Sawyer	Chelsea	Southend United	Loan
14 July 2009	Carlos Tevez	Media Sports Investments	Manchester City	£25m
15 July 2009	Shaun Barker	Blackpool	Derby County	£1m
15 July 2009	Liam Dickinson	Derby County	Brighton & Hove Albion	Undisclosed
15 July 2009	Richard Eckersley	Manchester United	Burnley	Compensation
15 July 2009	Andy Taylor	Tranmere Rovers	Sheffield United	Undisclosed
15 July 2009	Bradley Wright-Phillips	Unattached	Plymouth Argyle	Free
16 July 2009	Stewart Downing	Middlesbrough	Aston Villa	£12m
17 July 2009	Mame Biram Diouf	Molde	Manchester United	Undisclosed
17 July 2009	Mame Biram Diouf	Manchester United	Molde	Loan
17 July 2009	Barry Ferguson	Rangers	Birmingham City	£1m
17 July 2009	Manucho	Manchester United	Real Valladolid	Undisclosed
18 July 2009	Emmanuel Adebayor	Arsenal	Manchester City	Undisclosed
18 July 2009	Ryan Bertrand	Chelsea	Reading	Loan
18 July 2009	Jason Scotland	Swansea City	Wigan Athletic	£2m
18 July 2009	Jure Travner	Celje	Watford	Undisclosed
20 July 2009	Kári Árnason	Unattached	Plymouth Argyle	Free
20 July 2009	Mark Byrne	Nottingham Forest	Rushden & Diamonds	Loan
20 July 2009	Chris Gunter	Tottenham Hotspur	Nottingham Forest	£1.75m
20 July 2009	Jordi López	Unattached	Swansea City	Free
20 July 2009	James McCarthy	Hamilton Academical	Wigan Athletic	£1.2m
20 July 2009	Paul McKenna	Preston North End	Nottingham Forest	£750k
20 July 2009	Krystian Pearce	Birmingham City	Peterborough United	Loan
20 July 2009	David Preece	Unattached	Barnsley	Free
21 July 2009	Oliver Bozanic	Reading	Cheltenham Town	Loan
21 July 2009	Luke Daniels	West Bromwich Albion	Tranmere Rovers	Loan
21 July 2009	Jason Euell	Unattached	Blackpool	Free
21 July 2009	Dan Harding	Ipswich Town	Southampton	Free
21 July 2009	Matt Thornhill	Nottingham Forest	Brighton & Hove Albion	Loan
22 July 2009	Dexter Blackstock	Queens Park Rangers	Nottingham Forest	Undisclosed
22 July 2009	David Button	Tottenham Hotspur	Crewe Alexandra	Loan
22 July 2009	Patrick Kisnorbo	Leicester City	Leeds United	Free
22 July 2009	Joel Lynch	Brighton & Hove Albion	Nottingham Forest	£200k
22 July 2009	Kyle Naughton	Sheffield United	Tottenham Hotspur	Undisclosed
22 July 2009	Bjørn Helge Riise	Lillestrøm	Fulham	Undisclosed
22 July 2009	Kyle Walker	Sheffield United	Tottenham Hotspur	Undisclosed
23 July 2009	Felipe Caicedo	Manchester City	Sporting CP	Loan
22 July 2009	Radosław Majewski	Polonia Warsaw	Nottingham Forest	Loan
23 July 2009	Danny Mills	Crawley Town	Peterborough United	Undisclosed
23 July 2009	Adel Taarabt	Tottenham Hotspur	Queens Park Rangers	Loan
24 July 2009	Ben Alnwick	Tottenham Hotspur	Norwich City	Loan
24 July 2009	Lorik Cana	Marseille	Sunderland	£5m
24 July 2009	Ched Evans	Manchester City	Sheffield United	£3m
24 July 2009	Daniel Fox	Coventry City	Celtic	£1.5m
24 July 2009	Ryan France	Unattached	Sheffield United	Free
24 July 2009	Colin Healy	Cork City	Ipswich Town	Undisclosed
24 July 2009	Shaleum Logan	Manchester City	Tranmere Rovers	Loan
24 July 2009	Alex McCarthy	Reading	Yeovil Town	Loan
24 July 2009	John Ruddy	Everton	Motherwell	Loan
24 July 2009	Keith Treacy	Blackburn Rovers	Sheffield United	Loan
24 July 2009	Simon Whaley	Preston North End	Norwich City	Undisclosed
24 July 2009	Dean Whitehead	Sunderland	Stoke City	£3m
24 July 2009	Rhoys Wiggins	Crystal Palace	Norwich City	Undisclosed
25 July 2009	Zat Knight	Aston Villa	Bolton Wanderers	Undisclosed
25 July 2009	Sam Ricketts	Hull City	Bolton Wanderers	Undisclosed
27 July 2009	Peter Crouch	Portsmouth	Tottenham Hotspur	Undisclosed
27 July 2009	Cian Hughton	Tottenham Hotspur	Lincoln City	Free
27 July 2009	Izzy Iriekpen	Bristol City	Hamilton Academical	Free
27 July 2009	Romone McCrae	Crawley Town	Peterborough United	Undisclosed
27 July 2009	Callum Reynolds	Portsmouth	Luton Town	Loan
28 July 2009	Kim Do-Heon	West Bromwich Albion	Suwon Bluewings	£360k
28 July 2009	Sherjill MacDonald	West Bromwich Albion	Germinal Beerschot	£650k
28 July 2009	Håvard Nordtveit	Arsenal	Nürnberg	Loan
28 July 2009	Shane O'Connor	Unattached	Ipswich Town	Free
28 July 2009	Scott Rendell	Peterborough United	Torquay United	Loan
29 July 2009	Alvaro Arbeloa	Liverpool	Real Madrid	£3.5m
29 July 2009	Reda Johnson	Amiens	Plymouth Argyle	Undisclosed
29 July 2009	Danny Spence	Reading	Salisbury City	Free
29 July 2009	Danzelle St Louis-Hamilton	Stoke City	Vauxhall Motors	Loan
29 July 2009	Kolo Touré	Arsenal	Manchester City	Undisclosed
30 July 2009	Elano	Manchester City	Galatasaray	Undisclosed
30 July 2009	Stern John	Unattached	Crystal Palace	Free
30 July 2009	Alessandro Pellicori	Unattached	Queens Park Rangers	Free
31 July 2009	Steve Finnan	Unattached	Portsmouth	Free
31 July 2009	Fraser Forster	Newcastle United	Bristol Rovers	Loan
31 July 2009	Obafemi Martins	Newcastle United	Wolfsburg	Undisclosed
31 July 2009	Reuben Reid	Rotherham United	West Bromwich Albion	Undisclosed
31 July 2009	Jordan Rhodes	Ipswich Town	Huddersfield Town	Undisclosed
31 July 2009	Nicky Travis	Sheffield United	Central Coast Mariners	Free
31 July 2009	Geoff Horsfield	Unattached	Port Vale	Free
3 August 2009	Mark Bunn	Blackburn Rovers	Sheffield United	Loan
3 August 2009	Franco Di Santo	Chelsea	Blackburn Rovers	Loan
3 August 2009	Karl Hawley	Preston North End	Notts County	Undisclosed
3 August 2009	Rene Howe	Peterborough United	Lincoln City	Loan
3 August 2009	Joss Labadie	West Bromwich Albion	Shrewsbury Town	Loan
3 August 2009	Kevin Lisbie	Ipswich Town	Colchester United	Loan
3 August 2009	Leroy Lita	Unattached	Middlesbrough	Free
3 August 2009	Paul Parry	Cardiff City	Preston North End	Undisclosed
4 August 2009	Charlie Adam	Rangers	Blackpool	£500k
4 August 2009	Fabian Delph	Leeds United	Aston Villa	Undisclosed
4 August 2009	Quinton Fortune	Unattached	Doncaster Rovers	Free
4 August 2009	Alan Judge	Blackburn Rovers	Plymouth Argyle	Loan
4 August 2009	Michael McIndoe	Bristol City	Coventry City	Undisclosed
4 August 2009	Mido	Middlesbrough	Zamalek	Loan
4 August 2009	Jason Puncheon	Plymouth Argyle	Milton Keynes Dons	Loan
4 August 2009	James Wesolowski	Leicester City	Hamilton Academical	Loan
5 August 2009	Xabi Alonso	Liverpool	Real Madrid	£30m
5 August 2009	Darren Bent	Tottenham Hotspur	Sunderland	£10m
5 August 2009	Glen Little	Unattached	Sheffield United	Free
5 August 2009	Graeme Murty	Unattached	Southampton	Free
5 August 2009	Matthew Mills	Doncaster Rovers	Reading	Undisclosed
5 August 2009	Frédéric Piquionne	Lyon	Portsmouth	Loan
5 August 2009	Veliče Šumulikoski	Ipswich Town	Preston North End	Undisclosed
5 August 2009	Kyle Walker	Tottenham Hotspur	Sheffield United	Loan
6 August 2009	Jozy Altidore	Villarreal	Hull City	Loan
6 August 2009	Jack Colback	Sunderland	Ipswich Town	Loan
6 August 2009	Michael Doyle	Coventry City	Leeds United	Loan
6 August 2009	Mustapha Dumbuya	Unattached	Doncaster Rovers	Free
6 August 2009	Fernando Guerrero	Independiente del Valle	Burnley	Loan
6 August 2009	Gavin Gunning	Blackburn Rovers	Tranmere Rovers	Loan
6 August 2009	Alex Marrow	Blackburn Rovers	Oldham Athletic	Loan
6 August 2009	Ben Marshall	Stoke City	Northampton Town	Loan
6 August 2009	Seyi Olofinjana	Stoke City	Hull City	£3m
6 August 2009	Tamas Priskin	Watford	Ipswich Town	Undisclosed
6 August 2009	Romone Rose	Queens Park Rangers	Northampton Town	Loan
6 August 2009	Scott Sinclair	Chelsea	Wigan Athletic	Loan
6 August 2009	Byron Webster	Baník Most	Doncaster Rovers	Undisclosed
6 August 2009	Sebastien Bassong	Newcastle United	Tottenham Hotspur	Undisclosed
7 August 2009	Alberto Aquilani	Roma	Liverpool	Undisclosed
7 August 2009	Habib Beye	Newcastle United	Aston Villa	Undisclosed
7 August 2009	Ishmel Demontagnac	Unattached	Blackpool	Free
7 August 2009	Neal Eardley	Oldham Athletic	Blackpool	Undisclosed
7 August 2009	Kyle Letheren	Unattached	Plymouth Argyle	Free
7 August 2009	Antti Niemi	Unattached	Portsmouth	Free
10 August 2009	Adam Hammill	Liverpool	Barnlsey	Undisclosed
10 August 2009	Mark Hudson	Unattached	Blackpool	Free
10 August 2009	Nikola Kalinić	Hajduk Split	Blackburn Rovers	£6m
10 August 2009	Rickie Lambert	Bristol Rovers	Southampton	Undisclosed
10 August 2009	Jake Livermore	Tottenham Hotspur	Derby County	Loan
10 August 2009	Joe Mattock	Leicester City	West Bromwich Albion	Undisclosed
10 August 2009	Adam Nowland	Unattached	Blackpool	Free
10 August 2009	Jay O'Shea	Galway United	Birmingham City	Undisclosed
10 August 2009	Aman Verma	Leicester City	Crewe Alexandra	Loan
12 August 2009	Lee Cattermole	Wigan Athletic	Sunderland	£6m
12 August 2009	Andy Marshall	Unattached	Aston Villa	Free
13 August 2009	Kamel Ghilas	Celta de Vigo	Hull City	Undisclosed
13 August 2009	Stephen Hunt	Reading	Hull City	Undisclosed
13 August 2009	Artur Krysiak	Birmingham City	Burton Albion	Loan
13 August 2009	Michael Mancienne	Chelsea	Wolverhampton Wanderers	Loan
13 August 2009	Anthony Vanden Borre	Genoa	Portsmouth	Loan
13 August 2009	Grégory Vignal	Lens	Birmingham City	Undisclosed
14 August 2009	Antonio Amaya	Rayo Vallecano	Wigan Athletic	Undisclosed
14 August 2009	Danny Drinkwater	Manchester United	Huddersfield Town	Loan
14 August 2009	Tommy Forecast	Southampton	Grimsby Town	Loan
14 August 2009	Alan Gow	Rangers	Plymouth Argyle	Undisclosed
14 August 2009	Emil Hallfreðsson	Reggina	Barnsley	Loan
14 August 2009	John Paul Kissock	Everton	Hamilton Academical	Undisclosed
14 August 2009	Radoslav Kováč	Spartak Moscow	West Ham United	Undisclosed
14 August 2009	Lee Chung-Yong	FC Seoul	Bolton Wanderers	Undisclosed
14 August 2009	Jacob Mellis	Chelsea	Southampton	Loan
14 August 2009	Tope Obadeyi	Bolton Wanderers	Swindon Town	Loan
14 August 2009	Kasper Schmeichel	Manchester City	Notts County	Undisclosed
14 August 2009	Cillian Sheridan	Celtic	Plymouth Argyle	Loan
14 August 2009	Danny Simpson	Manchester United	Newcastle United	Loan
14 August 2009	Jerome Thomas	Unattached	West Bromwich Albion	Free
14 August 2009	Harry Worley	Leicester City	Crewe Alexandra	Loan
15 August 2009	Tom Heaton	Manchester United	Queens Park Rangers	Loan
15 August 2009	Jason Shackell	Wolverhampton Wanderers	Doncaster Rovers	Loan
15 August 2009	Andrius Velička	Rangers	Bristol City	Loan
17 August 2009	Tom Cleverley	Manchester United	Watford	Loan
17 August 2009	Shaun Cummings	Chelsea	West Bromwich Albion	Loan
17 August 2009	Kevan Hurst	Scunthorpe United	Carlisle United	Undisclosed
17 August 2009	Nemanja Matić	MFK Košice	Chelsea	£1.5m
17 August 2009	Nathan Porritt	Middlesbrough	Darlington	Loan
18 August 2009	André Bikey	Reading	Burnley	Undisclosed
18 August 2009	Damien Duff	Newcastle United	Fulham	Undisclosed
18 August 2009	Claudio Pizarro	Chelsea	Werder Bremen	Undisclosed
19 August 2009	Michel Salgado	Unattached	Blackburn Rovers	Free
20 August 2009	Medi Amalimba	Southend United	Derby County	Undisclosed
20 August 2009	Elliott Bennett	Wolverhampton Wanderers	Brighton & Hove Albion	Undisclosed
20 August 2009	Neal Trotman	Preston North End	Southampton	Loan
20 August 2009	James Wilson	Bristol City	Brentford	Loan
21 August 2009	Ashley Chambers	Leicester City	Wycombe Wanderers	Loan
21 August 2009	Paul Gallagher	Blackburn Rovers	Leicester City	Undisclosed
21 August 2009	Andy Gray	Charlton Athletic	Barnsley	Undisclosed
21 August 2009	Marlon Jackson	Bristol City	Hereford United	Loan
21 August 2009	Adam Kay	Burnley	Chester City	Loan
21 August 2009	Sotirios Kyrgiakos	AEK Athens	Liverpool	Undisclosed
21 August 2009	Adrian Leijer	Fulham	Melbourne Victory	Undisclosed
21 August 2009	Chris Lynch	Burnley	Chester City	Loan
21 August 2009	Tristan Plummer	Bristol City	Hereford United	Loan
21 August 2009	Anthony Stokes	Sunderland	Hibernian	Undisclosed
21 August 2009	Robbie Threlfall	Liverpool	Northampton Town	Loan
21 August 2009	Luke Varney	Derby County	Sheffield Wednesday	Loan
22 August 2009	Mohamed Diamé	Rayo Vallecano	Wigan Athletic	Undisclosed
22 August 2009	Kelvin Etuhu	Manchester City	Cardiff City	Loan
24 August 2009	Jonathan Greening	West Bromwich Albion	Fulham	Loan
24 August 2009	Besian Idrizaj	Unattached	Swansea City	Free
24 August 2009	Yann Kermorgant	Unattached	Leicester City	Free
24 August 2009	Sylvinho	Unattached	Manchester City	Free
24 August 2009	Damien McCrory	Plymouth Argyle	Port Vale	Loan
25 August 2009	Diniyar Bilyaletdinov	Lokomotiv Moscow	Everton	Undisclosed
25 August 2009	Gonzalo Jara	Colo-Colo	West Bromwich Albion	£1.4m
25 August 2009	Joleon Lescott	Everton	Manchester City	Undisclosed
25 August 2009	Krisztián Németh	Liverpool	AEK Athens	Loan
25 August 2009	András Simon	Liverpool	Córdoba CF	Loan
26 August 2009	Lukas Jutkiewicz	Everton	Motherwell	Loan
26 August 2009	Ryan Smith	Unattached	Crystal Palace	Free
26 August 2009	Solomon Taiwo	Dagenham & Redbridge	Cardiff City	£250k
27 August 2009	Luke Boden	Sheffield Wednesday	Northampton Town	Loan
27 August 2009	Pascal Chimbonda	Tottenham Hotspur	Blackburn Rovers	£2m
27 August 2009	Kagisho Dikgacoi	Golden Arrows	Fulham	Undisclosed
27 August 2009	Robert Huth	Middlesbrough	Stoke City	£5m
27 August 2009	Jobi McAnuff	Watford	Reading	Undisclosed
27 August 2009	Grzegorz Rasiak	Southampton	Reading	Undisclosed
27 August 2009	Jay Simpson	Arsenal	Queens Park Rangers	Loan
27 August 2009	Tommy Smith	Watford	Portsmouth	Undisclosed
27 August 2009	Stephen Warnock	Blackburn Rovers	Aston Villa	Undisclosed
28 August 2009	Craig Beattie	West Bromwich Albion	Swansea City	£500k
28 August 2009	Darcy Blake	Cardiff City	Plymouth Argyle	Loan
28 August 2009	Kevin-Prince Boateng	Tottenham Hotpur	Portsmouth	£4m
28 August 2009	Michael Brown	Wigan Athletic	Portsmouth	Undisclosed
28 August 2009	Alessandro Diamanti	Livorno	West Ham United	Undisclosed
28 August 2009	Paul Dickov	Leicester City	Derby County	Loan
28 August 2009	Aruna Dindane	Lens	Portsmouth	Loan
28 August 2009	Sylvain Distin	Portsmouth	Everton	Undisclosed
28 August 2009	Fraser Forster	Newcastle United	Norwich City	Loan
28 August 2009	John Mensah	Lyon	Sunderland	Loan
28 August 2009	Jamie O'Hara	Tottenham Hotspur	Portsmouth	Loan
28 August 2009	Tuncay	Middlesbrough	Stoke City	£5m
28 August 2009	Lee Trundle	Bristol City	Swansea City	Loan
29 August 2009	Sam Gaughran	Peterborough United	Grays Athletic	Loan
29 August 2009	Andrei Shevchenko	Chelsea	Dynamo Kyiv	Free
30 August 2009	Paul McShane	Sunderland	Hull City	Undisclosed
31 August 2009	Diego Arismendi	Club Nacional	Stoke City	£2.6m
31 August 2009	Nicholas Bignall	Reading	Stockport County	Loan
31 August 2009	Segundo Castillo	Red Star Belgrade	Wolverhampton Wanderers	Loan
31 August 2009	Manuel da Costa	Fiorentina	West Ham United	Undisclosed
31 August 2009	Charles Itandje	Liverpool	Kavala	Loan
31 August 2009	Stefan Maierhofer	Rapid Wien	Wolverhampton Wanderers	Undisclosed
31 August 2009	Scott Moffatt	Manchester United	Altrincham	Loan
31 August 2009	Kristian O'Leary	Swansea City	Leyton Orient	Loan
31 August 2009	Savio	West Ham United	Fiorentina	Undisclosed
31 August 2009	Michael Turner	Hull City	Sunderland	Undisclosed
31 August 2009	Simon Walton	Plymouth Argyle	Crewe Alexandra	Loan
1 September 2009	Radanfah Abu Bakr	Unattached	Swansea City	Free
1 September 2009	Adam Barton	Preston North End	Crawley Town	Loan
1 September 2009	Tal Ben Haim	Manchester City	Portsmouth	Undisclosed
1 September 2009	Hamer Bouazza	Unattached	Blackpool	Free
1 September 2009	Leigh Bromby	Sheffield United	Leeds United	Undisclosed
1 September 2009	David Button	Tottenham Hotspur	Crewe Alexandra	Loan
1 September 2009	David Carney	Sheffield United	Twente	Undisclosed
1 September 2009	Danny Collins	Sunderland	Stoke City	£2.75m
1 September 2009	Dominic Collins	Preston North End	Crawley Town	Loan
1 September 2009	James Collins	West Ham United	Aston Villa	Undisclosed
1 September 2009	Neill Collins	Wolverhampton Wanderers	Preston North End	Loan
1 September 2009	Sam Cox	Tottenham Hotspur	Cheltenham Town	Loan
1 September 2009	Arron Davies	Nottingham Forest	Brighton & Hove Albion	Loan
1 September 2009	Claude Davis	Unattached	Crystal Palace	Free
1 September 2009	Richard Dunne	Manchester City	Aston Villa	£6m
1 September 2009	Carlos Edwards	Sunderland	Ipswich Town	Undisclosed
1 September 2009	David Elm	Kalmar FF	Fulham	Undisclosed
1 September 2009	John Heitinga	Atlético Madrid	Everton	£6m
1 September 2009	Lee Hendrie	Sheffield United	Derby County	Undisclosed
1 September 2009	Oscar Jansson	Tottenham Hotspur	Exeter City	Loan
1 September 2009	Ivan Klasnić	Nantes	Bolton Wanderers	Loan
1 September 2009	Niko Kranjčar	Portsmouth	Tottenham Hotspur	Undisclosed
1 September 2009	Grant Leadbitter	Sunderland	Ipswich Town	Undisclosed
1 September 2009	Peter Løvenkrands	Unattached	Newcastle United	Free
1 September 2009	Clayton McDonald	Manchester City	Walsall	Loan
1 September 2009	David Nugent	Portsmouth	Burnley	Loan
1 September 2009	Darren O'Dea	Celtic	Reading	Loan
1 September 2009	Álvaro Saborío	Sion	Bristol City	Loan
1 September 2009	Billy Sharp	Sheffield United	Doncaster Rovers	Loan
1 September 2009	Ibrahima Sonko	Stoke City	Hull City	Loan
1 September 2009	Evander Sno	Ajax	Bristol City	Loan
1 September 2009	Jordan Stewart	Derby County	Sheffield United	Undisclosed
1 September 2009	Teemu Tainio	Sunderland	Birmingham City	Loan
1 September 2009	Borja Valero	West Bromwich Albion	Real Mallorca	Loan
1 September 2009	Ben Watson	Wigan Athletic	Queens Park Rangers	Loan
1 September 2009	Mike Williamson	Watford	Portsmouth	£3m
1 September 2009	Shaun Cummings	Chelsea	Reading	Undisclosed
1 September 2009	Jack Wilson	Unattached	Doncaster Rovers	Free
1 September 2009	Hassan Yebda	Benfica	Portsmouth	Loan
1 September 2009	James Harper	Reading	Sheffield United	Loan
1 September 2009	Brian Howard	Sheffield United	Reading	Undisclosed

- ^1 Player officially joined his new club on 1 July 2009.

== Notes and references ==
General

- "Transfers – February 2009". BBC Sport. BBC. 28 February 2009.
- "Transfers – March 2009". BBC Sport. BBC. 26 March 2009.
- "Transfers – April 2009". BBC Sport. BBC. 28 April 2009.
- "Transfers – May 2009". BBC Sport. BBC. 31 May 2009.
- "Transfers – June 2009". BBC Sport. BBC. 30 June 2009.
- "Transfers – July 2009". BBC Sport. BBC. 1 August 2009.
- "Transfers – August 2009". BBC Sport. BBC. 1 September 2009.
- "Transfers – September 2009". BBC Sport. BBC. 2 September 2009.

Specific
