= Nathan Koranteng =

English footballer

Personal information
- Full name: Nathan Papa Kwabena Twum Koranteng
- Date of birth: 26 May 1992 (age 34)
- Place of birth: Hackney, London, England
- Position: Winger

Team information
- Current team: Hashtag United

Youth career
- 2007–2009: Peterborough United

Senior career*
Years	Team	Apps	(Gls)
2009–2011	Peterborough United	4	(0)
2009	→ Tamworth (loan)	1	(0)
2009–2010	→ Spalding United (loan)	1	(0)
2010	→ Boston United (loan)	3	(2)
2010	→ Rushden & Diamonds (loan)	4	(0)
2011	→ Boston United (loan)	3	(0)
2011	Woking	17	(0)
2011	→ Boreham Wood (loan)	4	(1)
2012	Boreham Wood	1	(0)
2012–2013	Tonbridge Angels	29	(1)
2013	St Neots Town	7	(0)
2013	East Thurrock United	6	(0)
2013–2014	Aveley	23	(3)
2014–2015	Maldon & Tiptree	30	(6)
2015–2017	Witham Town	79	(20)
2018	Cheshunt	4	(3)
2018–2019	Harlow Town	19	(3)
2019–2026	Waltham Abbey	204	(25)
2026–	Hashtag United	0	(0)
- * Club domestic league appearances and goals as of 18:54, 28 June 2026 (UTC)

Nathan Papa Kwabana Twum Koranteng (born 26 May 1992) is an English footballer who plays as a winger for Hashtag United.

== Career ==
Born in London, Koranteng signed for Conference National team Tamworth on loan in September 2009. He joined Boston United on loan in January 2010.

In August 2010 he joined Rushden & Diamonds on loan for a month.

On 7 January 2012, he scored his first goal for Tonbridge Angels in just his second start.

In April 2013 Koranteng joined Southern Premier side St Neots Town.

Koranteng joined East Thurrock for the start of the 2013–14 season.

In 2013 Koranteng joined Aveley. His debut against Cheshunt was marred by receiving a red card in the first half. He left the club after making 25 appearances.

During the 2014–15 season, Koranteng played for Maldon & Tiptree, making 30 league appearances and scoring six goals, including a brace in a 3–5 home defeat to Great Wakering Rovers on 13 December.

In 2015 he moved on to Witham Town, where he made 31 league appearances in his first season, scoring nine goals, and was ever-present during his second season, but departed the club after only six games in the 2017–18 season.

After almost a year without a club, he joined Cheshunt in August 2018, scoring two goals on his debut, but made only three further appearances before leaving the club the following month.

In late September 2018, he joined Harlow Town, where he enjoyed regular first-team football again throughout the next four months, scoring three goals in nineteen league matches.

In February 2019, Koranteng moved to Waltham Abbey, scoring three goals in twelve games during the latter part of the season, and remained with the club for the abandoned 2019–20 and 2020–21 seasons.

In June 2026, Koranteng joined Isthmian League North Division club Hashtag United.

== Career statistics ==
As of end of 2025–26 season

Appearances and goals by club, season and competition
Club	Season	Division	League		FA Cup		League Cup		Other		Total	
Club	Season	Division	Apps	Goals	Apps	Goals	Apps	Goals	Apps	Goals	Apps	Goals
Peterborough United	2009–10	Championship	4	0	0	0	0	0	0	0	4	0
Peterborough United	2010–11	League One	0	0	0	0	0	0	0	0	0	0
Peterborough United	Total		4	0	0	0	0	0	0	0	4	0
Tamworth (loan)	2009–10	Conference Premier	1	0	0	0	—		0	0	1	0
Spalding United (loan)	2009–10	NPL Division One South	1	0	0	0	—		0	0	1	0
Boston United (loan)	2009–10	NPL Premier Division	3	2	0	0	—		0	0	3	2
Rushden & Diamonds (loan)	2010–11	Conference Premier	4	0	0	0	—		0	0	4	0
Boston United (loan)	2010–11	Conference North	3	0	0	0	—		0	0	3	0
Woking	2010–11	Conference South	11	0	0	0	—		0	0	11	0
Woking	2011–12	Conference South	6	0	0	0	—		0	0	6	0
Woking	Total		17	0	0	0	0	0	0	0	17	0
Boreham Wood (loan)	2011–12	Conference South	4	1	0	0	—		0	0	4	1
Boreham Wood	2011–12	Conference South	1	0	0	0	—		1	0	2	0
Tonbridge Angels	2011–12	Conference South	19	1	0	0	—		0	0	19	1
Tonbridge Angels	2012–13	Conference South	10	0	0	0	—		0	0	10	0
Tonbridge Angels	Total		29	1	0	0	0	0	0	0	29	1
St Neots Town	2012–13	SL Premier Division	7	0	0	0	—		0	0	7	0
East Thurrock United	2013–14	IL Premier Division	6	0	2	0	—		0	0	8	0
Aveley	2013–14	IL Division One North	23	3	0	0	—		2	0	25	3
Maldon & Tiptree	2014–15	IL Division One North	30	6	0	0	—		1	0	31	6
Witham Town	2015–16	IL Division One North	31	9	0	0	—		0	0	31	9
Witham Town	2016–17	IL Division One North	42	11	3	3	—		2	1	47	15
Witham Town	2017–18	IL Division One North	6	0	2	0	—		0	0	8	0
Witham Town	Total		79	20	5	3	0	0	2	1	86	24
Cheshunt	2018–19	IL Division One South Central	4	3	3	0	—		0	0	7	3
Harlow Town	2018–19	IL Premier Division	19	3	0	0	—		2	1	21	4
Waltham Abbey	2018–19	IL Division One South Central	12	3	0	0	—		0	0	12	3
Waltham Abbey	2019–20	IL Division One South Central	28	5	3	1	—		5	0	36	6
Waltham Abbey	2020–21	IL Division One South Central	4	1	0	0	—		0	0	4	1
Waltham Abbey	2021–22	SL Division One South Central	36	6	1	0	—		3	2	40	8
Waltham Abbey	2022–23	SL Division One South Central	20	1	4	1	—		1	0	25	2
Waltham Abbey	2023–24	SL Division One South Central	30	2	2	0	—		1	0	33	2
Waltham Abbey	2024–25	IL Division One North	37	4	2	0	—		3	1	42	5
Waltham Abbey	2025–26	IL Division One North	37	2	3	1	—		4	0	44	3
Waltham Abbey	Total		204	24	15	3	0	0	17	3	236	30
Career total			439	63	25	6	0	0	25	5	489	74
