= Hull City A.F.C. in European football =

English club in European football

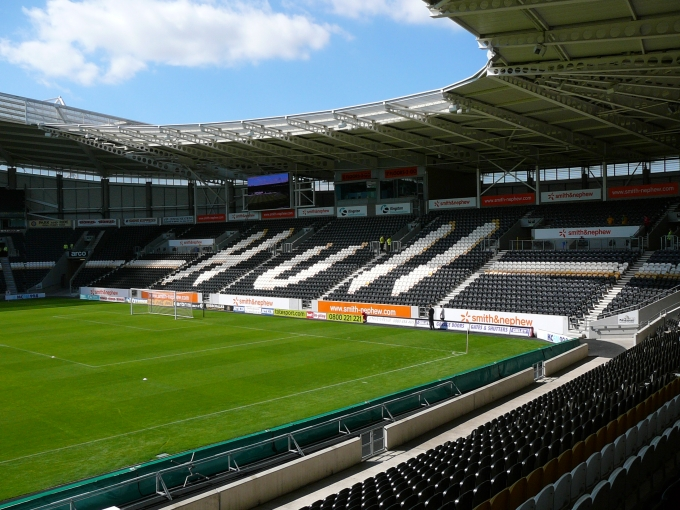
- KC Stadium (2007 image), home to Hull City during their maiden UEFA tournament entry.
- Club: Hull City
- Seasons played: 1
- First entry: 2014–15 UEFA Europa League
- Latest entry: 2014–15 UEFA Europa League

Hull City Association Football Club is an English football club based in Kingston upon Hull, East Riding of Yorkshire. The club was founded in 1904 and has competed in the English football league system since 1905. Their first major European campaign was the UEFA Europa League in 2014–15. The club also entered the Anglo-Italian Cup and the Anglo-Scottish Cup.

== History ==
=== 1973 Anglo-Italian Cup ===
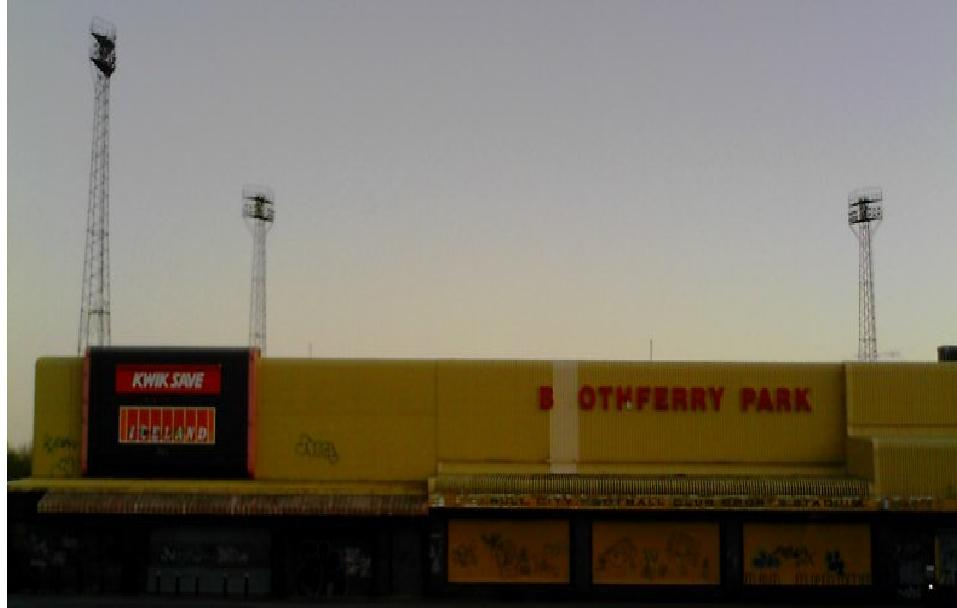
Boothferry Park (2008 image), Hull's former stadium and scene of victories over Verona and international-laden Lazio in 1973.

Hull's first and only appearance in the Anglo-Italian Cup came in 1973, while Terry Neill was manager. City were one of eight English clubs involved; the others were Blackpool, Crystal Palace, Fulham, Luton Town, Manchester United, Newcastle United and Oxford United.

The Tigers first faced a Lazio team who had played five internationalists in the game, and registered a victory latterly described by the Hull Daily Mail as "unlikely". Ken Knighton and Roy Greenwood scored in the 2–1 win at Boothferry Park on 21 February 1973 in front of 7,325. An away defeat at the hands of Fiorentina in March was next, before City won again at home; this time Ken Houghton joined Knighton on the scoresheet in a match against Hellas Verona on 4 April. Their final match was a goalless draw with Bari on 2 May. Due to lack of interest the tournament ceased after this edition.

Season	Competition	Round	Opposition	Score
1973	Anglo-Italian Cup	Group stage	(Italy) Lazio	2–1 (H)
1973	Anglo-Italian Cup	Group stage	(Italy) Fiorentina	1–0 (A)
1973	Anglo-Italian Cup	Group stage	(Italy) Hellas Verona	2–1 (H)
1973	Anglo-Italian Cup	Group stage	(Italy) Bari	0–0 (A)

=== 1975–76 Anglo-Scottish Cup ===
The Anglo-Scottish Cup was created in the 1975–76 season, after Texaco dropped their sponsorship of the Texaco Cup. The new Cup would use a group stage format in which each team would play the others in the group once, with only the team finishing top of the group progressing. After electing not to enter the predecessor trophy, Hull entered the inaugural Anglo-Scottish Cup. Hull were in Group 2 of the English Qualifiers, with Leicester City, Mansfield Town and West Bromwich Albion. Hull finished bottom of the group, failing to register a win.

Season	Competition	Round	Opposition	Score
1975–76	Anglo-Scottish Cup	First round	(England) Leicester City	1–1 (H)
1975–76	Anglo-Scottish Cup	First round	(England) West Bromwich Albion	1–2 (H)
1975–76	Anglo-Scottish Cup	First round	(England) Mansfield Town	2–1 (A)

=== 1976–77 Anglo-Scottish Cup ===
City fared better in the 1976–77 tournament. This time, Hull were in Group 4 of the English Qualifiers, with Middlesbrough, Newcastle United and Sheffield United. Hull finished third in the group, picking up one win, one draw and one loss.

Season	Competition	Round	Opposition	Score
1976–77	Anglo-Scottish Cup	First round	(England) Middlesbrough	2–0 (A)
1976–77	Anglo-Scottish Cup	First round	(England) Newcastle United	0–0 (H)
1976–77	Anglo-Scottish Cup	First round	(England) Sheffield United	1–0 (H)

=== 1977–78 Anglo-Scottish Cup ===
A third straight Anglo-Scottish Cup campaign awaited the Tigers in 1977–78. Again, Hull would compete in Group 4 of the English Qualifiers, which would again feature Sheffield United. The other clubs in the group were Notts County and Oldham Athletic. Hull finished last, picking one solitary point, in a 1–1 draw with Oldham at Boundary Park.

Season	Competition	Round	Opposition	Score
1977–78	Anglo-Scottish Cup	First round	(England) Notts County	1–0 (A)
1977–78	Anglo-Scottish Cup	First round	(England) Sheffield United	0–2 (H)
1977–78	Anglo-Scottish Cup	First round	(England) Oldham Athletic	1–1 (A)

=== 1980–81 Anglo-Scottish Cup ===
After sitting out the 1978–79 and 1979–80 tournaments, the Tigers returned to the Anglo-Scottish Cup for the 1980–81 season. Again their programme would feature Sheffield United, as they and Hull were in Group 1 with Chesterfield and fellow Humberside club Grimsby Town. An inconsistent City finished third, their record comprising a win (in the Humber derby over Grimsby), a draw and a defeat. This Anglo-Scottish Cup would be the last, with Chesterfield as final champions retaining the trophy, which they hold to this day. In four seasons of Anglo-Scottish Cup play, the Tigers never faced a team from Scotland.

Season	Competition	Round	Opposition	Score
1980–81	Anglo-Scottish Cup	First round	(England) Grimsby Town	1–0 (H)
1980–81	Anglo-Scottish Cup	First round	(England) Sheffield United	2–1 (A)
1980–81	Anglo-Scottish Cup	First round	(England) Chesterfield	1–1 (A)

=== 2014–15 UEFA Europa League ===
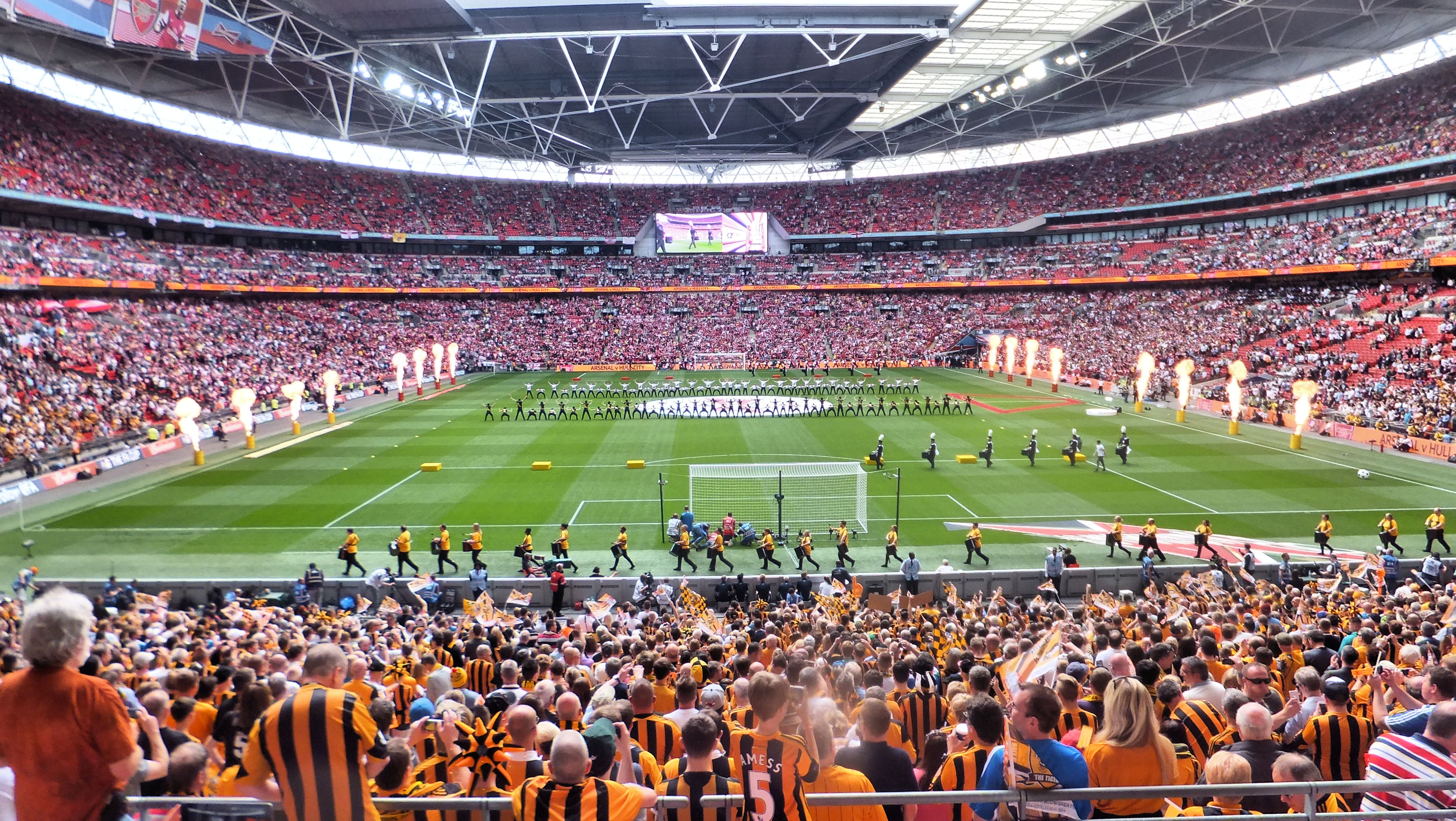
Tigers fans at the 2014 FA Cup Final, gateway to their maiden UEFA Europa League campaign.

Hull City, under manager Steve Bruce, were beaten finalists in the 2014 FA Cup Final, losing to Arsenal. This saw them awarded a place in the UEFA Europa League, joining fellow English clubs Everton and Tottenham Hotspur.

The Tigers entered at the third qualifying round, and faced FK AS Trenčín, who qualified by finishing second in the Slovak Super Liga. The away leg finished goalless, with Tom Huddlestone seeing his penalty kick saved, before he hit the rebound over the crossbar. In the second leg at the KC Stadium, Hull were behind after only 91 seconds as Tomáš Malec scored. However, goals from Ahmed Elmohamady and Sone Aluko ensured Hull's progression to the play-off stage.

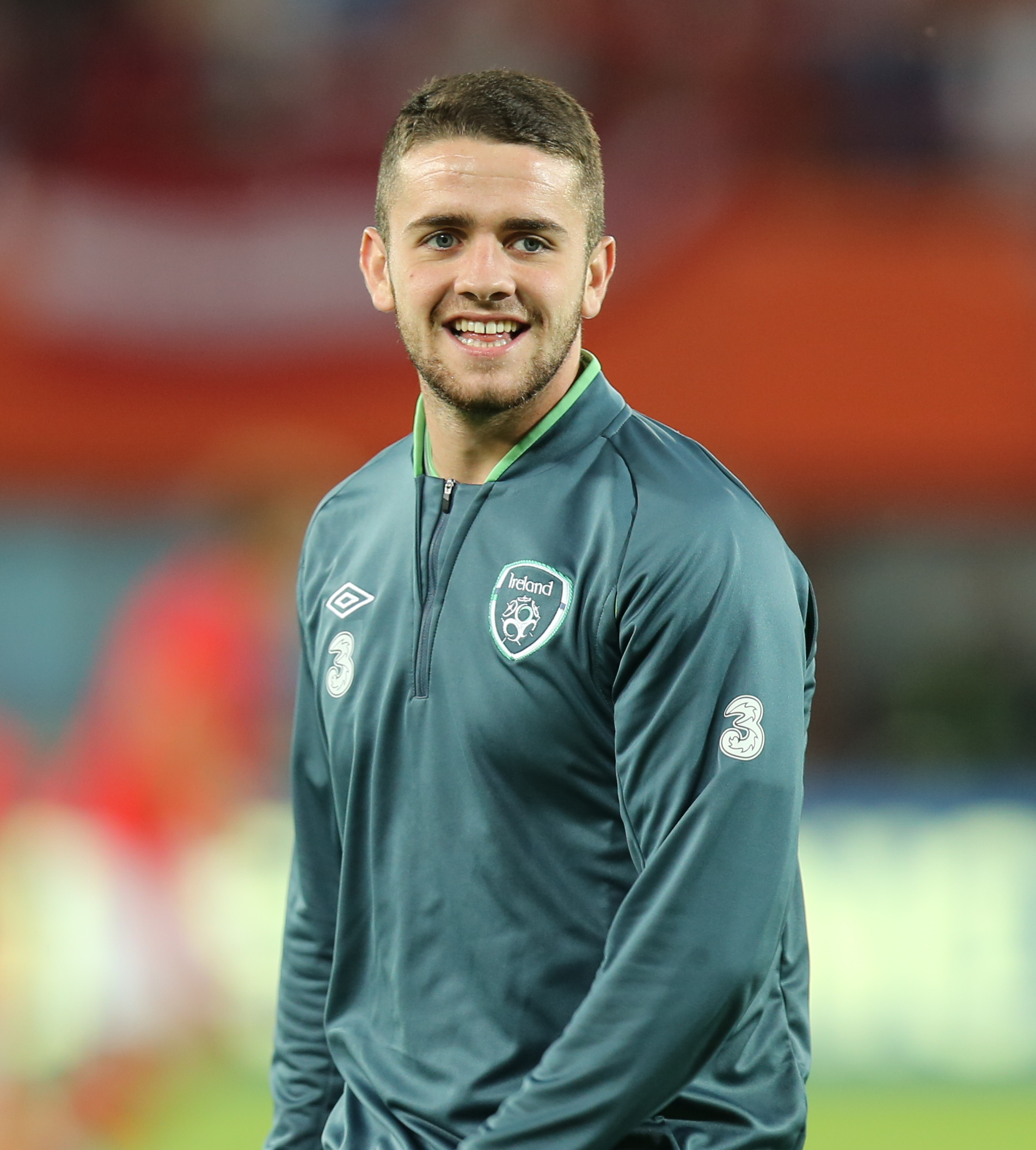
Robbie Brady's brace against Lokeren made him Hull's top European goalscorer.

Their play-off opponents were K.S.C. Lokeren Oost-Vlaanderen, winners of the 2013–14 Belgian Cup. Away in Flanders, Hull lost 1–0, with Hans Vanaken taking advantage of a "blunder" by City goalkeeper Allan McGregor. Bruce's team selection was criticised as "indecently weakened", with the same article questioning how seriously the club were taking the tournament. The away leg also saw reports of football hooliganism, with five arrests being made. In the second leg in Yorkshire, Robbie Brady scored twice however Jordan Remacle's goal proved crucial as the Tigers were eliminated by operation of the away goals rule.

Season	Competition	Round	Opposition	Score
2014–15	UEFA Europa League	Third qualifying round	(Slovakia) FK AS Trenčín	0–0 (A), 2–1 (H)
2014–15	UEFA Europa League	Play-off round	(Belgium) K.S.C. Lokeren Oost-Vlaanderen	1–0 (A), 2–1 (H) (Note: Lost on the away goals rule)

== Overall record ==
Competition	Pld	W	D	L	GF	GA	GD
Anglo-Italian Cup	4	2	1	1	4	3	+1
Anglo-Scottish Cup	12	2	4	6	10	12	-2
UEFA Europa League	4	2	1	1	4	3	+1
Total	20	6	6	8	18	18	0
