= Romone McCrae =

English footballer

Personal information
- Date of birth: 25 August 1991 (age 35)
- Place of birth: Southwark, London, England
- Position: Midfielder

Team information
- Current team: Sutton United

Senior career*
Years	Team	Apps	(Gls)
2008–2009	Crawley Town	0	(0)
2009–2011	Peterborough United	2	(0)
2010	→ Histon (loan)	18	(2)
2011–2012	Sutton United	28	(2)
- * Club domestic league appearances and goals as of 10 March 2012

Romone McCrae (born 25 August 1991) is a footballer who last played for Conference South team Sutton United.

== Career ==
He made his professional debut on 5 April 2010 in a 2–2 draw against Barnsley for Peterborough United. After joining Conference National side Histon on a season long loan in August 2010, he scored on his full league debut against Barrow on the opening day of the 2010–11 season. McCrae went on to make a further 17 appearances in the league.

McCrae was released by Peterborough in the summer of 2011, and was signed by London-based Sutton United. Manager Paul Doswell said, "He's a young lad who is not the finished product, but has promise and potential and the sort of player I like getting my teeth into to develop." McCrae scored his first goal for Sutton in his second appearance for the club, in a friendly against Kingstonian.
