= 2007–08 Shrewsbury Town F.C. season =

Shrewsbury Town F.C.
2007–08 season
- Chairman: Roland Wycherley
- Manager: Gary Peters (until 4 March 2008); Paul Simpson (from 12 March 2008)
- Stadium: New Meadow
- League Two: 18th
- FA Cup: First round (eliminated by Walsall)
- League Cup: Second round (eliminated by Lincoln City)
- League Trophy: First round (eliminated by Yeovil Town)
- Top goalscorer: David Hibbert (12)
- Highest home attendance: 7,707 v Stockport County, Football League Two, 26 December 2007
- Lowest home attendance: 3,069 v Colchester United, Football League Cup, 14 August 2007
- Average home league attendance: 5,659
- Biggest win: 4–0 (two matches)
- Biggest defeat: 0–3 (one match); 1–4 (two matches)
Home colours	Away colours	Third colours

The 2007–08 season was the 108th season of competitive association football and 57th season in the Football League played by Shrewsbury Town Football Club, a professional football club based in Shrewsbury, Shropshire, England. Their seventh-place finish in 2006–07 and loss to Bristol Rovers in the 2007 Football League Two play-off final meant it was their fourth successive season in League Two. During the summer of 2007 the club moved home stadium from Gay Meadow, where they had played since 1910, to New Meadow (also known as Oteley Road Stadium). The season began on 1 July 2007 and concluded on 30 June 2008.

Manager Gary Peters signed two players before the close of the summer transfer window. Having stood 11th in the league table on 19 January, Shrewsbury were on a seven-match run without a win when Peters left the club by mutual consent in March 2008. He was replaced by Paul Simpson, who led Shrewsbury to safety from relegation despite only achieving one win in his twelve matches. The team finished the season 18th in the table. They lost in their opening round matches in both the 2007–08 FA Cup and the Football League Trophy, and were eliminated in the second round of the Football League Cup.

34 players made at least one appearance in nationally organised first-team competition, and there were 19 different goalscorers. Defender Ben Herd appeared in 48 of the 50 first-team matches over the season, the most by any player. Defender Marc Tierney made the most starts with 46, he came on in one game as a substitution making him the player with the second most appearances overall. David Hibbert finished as leading scorer with 12 goals, all of which came in league competition. Hibbert also received the most yellow cards, being booked in nine matches. Colin Murdock was the only player to be sent off in a match, receiving a red card away at Grimsby Town in the league.

== Background and pre-season ==
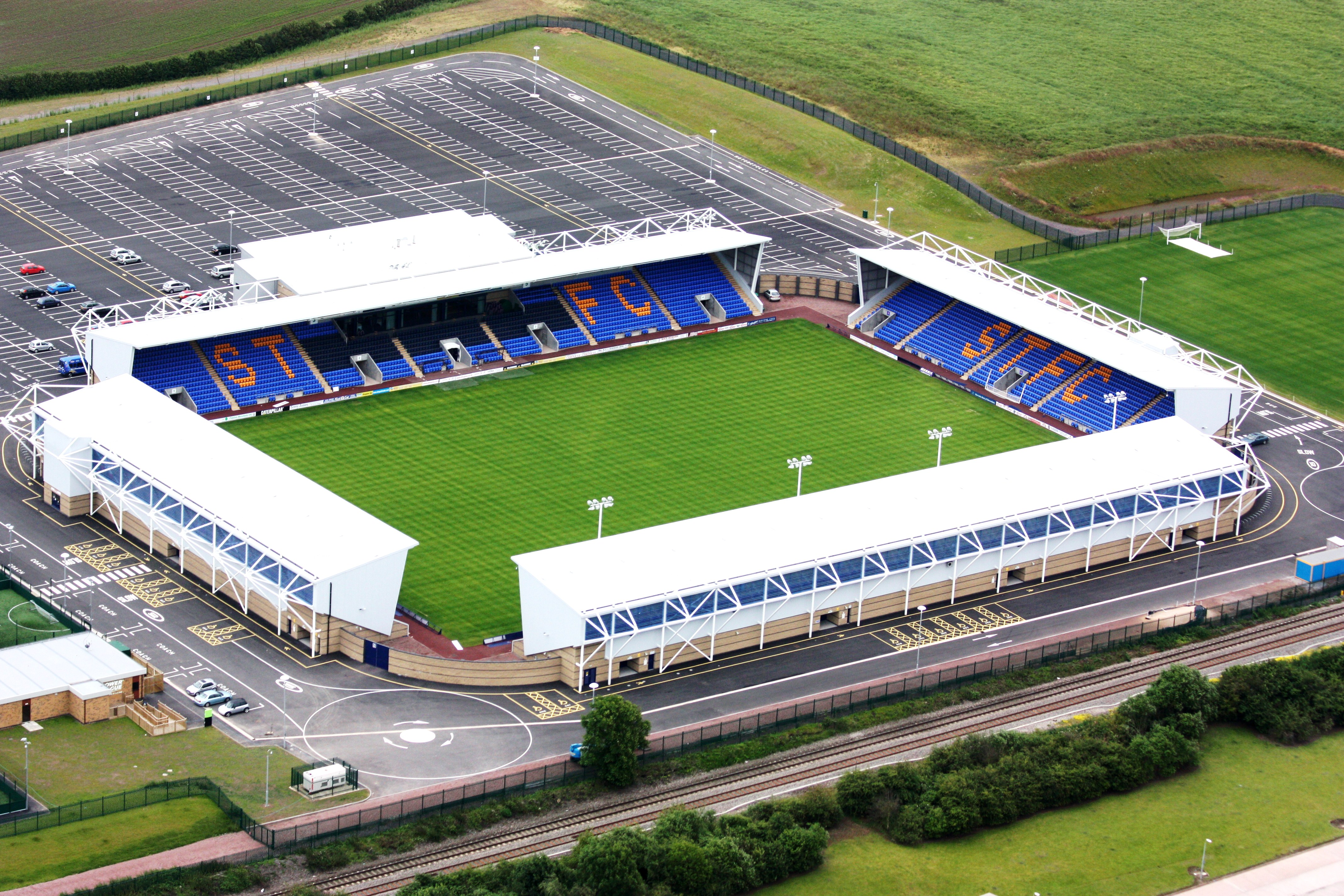
Shrewsbury Town moved to New Meadow in the summer of 2007.

The 2006–07 season was Gary Peters' third season as manager of Shrewsbury Town, following his appointment in November 2004. Shrewsbury reached the play-offs with a seventh-place finish in the 2006–07 League Two table. They beat Milton Keynes Dons 2–1 on aggregate with all goals coming in the second leg away at the National Hockey Stadium in Milton Keynes. Shrewsbury were beaten 3–1 in the 2007 Football League Two play-off final at Wembley Stadium and remained in League Two.

Shrewsbury Town left their home stadium Gay Meadow after 97 years at the end of the 2006–07 season. There were various reasons the club decided to move stadium, most notably due to the close proximity to the River Severn making it prone to flooding. A new stadium with a capacity of 10,000 spectators was built as a replacement for Gay Meadow, it was known during the building phase and the club's first season there as both New Meadow and Oteley Road Stadium, with the former being the final name (excluding names used for sponsorship purposes). The first match at the new stadium was played on the 14 July 2007 against A-Line All Stars, a goal each from David Hibbert, Danny Hall, Tom Moss and trialist Kieran Donnolly gave Shrewsbury a 4–0 win.

Ahead of 2007–08, Shrewsbury released Sagi Burton. Four players left the club: Richard Hope to Wrexham, David Edwards to Luton Town, Ross Draper to Stafford Rangers and Steven Hogg to Gretna. Shrewsbury made two permanent summer signings, those being defender Colin Murdock from Rotherham United, and striker Fola Onibuje from Wycombe Wanderers. Striker Stuart Nicholson was brought it on a scheduled season-long loan from West Bromwich Albion.

== Summary and aftermath ==
For the first six games Shrewsbury occupied a top seven place, enough for either automatic promotion or qualification in the League Two play-offs. From match seven Shrewsbury were in lower midtable for the rest of the season. Though never dropping as low as 23rd or 24th, the club went on a run of one win in 20 matches which brought them into the relegation battle, but a 3–0 win against Wrexham was enough for Shrewsbury to survive. The club finished in 18th place in the league table. Ben Herd made the most appearances for the club playing in 48 of the 50 first-team matches. David Hibbert was top scorer with 12 goals, all of them scored in League Two, and was the only player to reach double figures.

Ahead of the new season, Shrewsbury released Chris Mackenzie, Andy Cooke and Tom Moss. Colin Murdock, Luke Jones and Darran Kempson left to sign for Accrington Stanley, Kidderminster Harriers and Wrexham respectively. The club signed forward Grant Holt from Nottingham Forest, and defenders Mike Jackson from Blackpool, Shane Cansdell-Sherriff from Tranmere Rovers, and Graham Coughlan from Rotherham United. Brought in on loan were forward Richard Walker from Bristol Rovers, and goalkeeper Luke Daniels from West Bromwich Albion. The Shrewsbury Town F.C. Player of the Year award was established where the club's supporters voted for who they believed was the best player for Shrewsbury during the season, the award was first presented at the end of the 2008–09 season.

== Match details ==
=== League Two ===
11 August 2007 1 (1st)	Lincoln City	0–4	Shrewsbury Town	Lincoln
15:00			Cooke 52', 81'; Hibbert 57'; Leslie 82'	Stadium: Sincil Bank; Attendance: 3,893; Referee: Fred Graham

18 August 2007 2 (1st)	Shrewsbury Town	1–0	Bradford City	Shrewbury
15:00	Hall (yellow card) 17'; Hibbert 9' (pen.) (yellow card) 27'; Drummond (yellow card) 45'		Williams (yellow card) 22'	Stadium: New Meadow; Attendance: 6,413; Referee: Danny McDermid

25 August 2007 3 (3rd)	Milton Keynes Dons	3–0	Shrewsbury Town	Milton Keynes
15:00	Lewington (yellow card) 21'; Knight 47'; Wilbraham (yellow card) 58'; Stirling (yellow card) 74'; Dyer 78'; Andrews 84'		Hunt (yellow card) 80'	Stadium: Stadium MK; Attendance: 7,380; Referee: Gavin Ward

1 September 2007 4 (1st)	Shrewsbury Town	2–1	Grimsby Town	Shrewbury
15:00	Murdock (yellow card) 9'; Hibbert 50'; Symes 59'		Toner 68' (pen.) (yellow card) 71'; Bennett (yellow card) 51' (yellow-red card) 90'	Stadium: New Meadow; Attendance: 5,490; Referee: Jarnail Singh

8 September 2007 5 (3rd)	Stockport County	1–1	Shrewsbury Town	Stockport
15:00	Proudlock 32'; Williams (yellow card) 88'		Hibbert 25'	Stadium: Edgeley Park; Attendance: 5,473; Referee: Andy Penn

15 September 2007 6 (3rd)	Shrewsbury Town	2–0	Accrington Stanley	Shrewbury
15:00	Nicholson 3'; Langmead (yellow card) 26'; Hibbert 52' (pen.); Moss (yellow card) 87'		Procter (yellow card) 13'; Cavanagh (yellow card) 18'; Mullin (yellow card) 45'; Harris (red card) 48'; Whalley (yellow card) 66'; Brown (yellow card) 79'	Stadium: New Meadow; Attendance: 5,789; Referee: Andy Hall

22 September 2007 7 (4th)	Wycombe Wanderers	1–1	Shrewsbury Town	High Wycombe
15:00	McGleish 37'		Murdock 27'	Stadium: Adams Park; Attendance: 4,936; Referee: Stuart Attwell

29 September 2007 8 (6th)	Shrewsbury Town	3–4	Rochdale	Shrewbury
15:00	Hibbert 38'; Langmead (yellow card) 53'; Drummond (yellow card) 55' (goal) 62'; Hunt (yellow card) 59' (goal) 88'		Murray (yellow card) 39' (goal) 80'; Rundle 46'; Muirhead (yellow card) 70'; Jones 85'; Higginbotham (yellow card) 88' (goal) 90'	Stadium: New Meadow; Attendance: 6,262; Referee: Steven Cook

2 October 2007 9 (8th)	Shrewsbury Town	0–2	Peterborough United	Shrewbury
19:45	Hall (yellow card) 64'		McLean (yellow card) 27'; Lee 33'; Mackail-Smith (yellow card) 77'; Boyd 81'	Stadium: New Meadow; Attendance: 5,220; Referee: Andy Woolmer

7 October 2007 10 (9th)	Chester City	3–1	Shrewsbury Town	Chester
12:00	Dinning (yellow card) 26'; Partridge 62'; Hughes (yellow card) 68'; Murphy 72'; Yeo 73'		Drummond (yellow card) 15'; Murdock (yellow card) 20'; Symes (yellow card) 64'; Moss 69'	Stadium: Deva Stadium; Attendance: 3,057; Referee: Chris Foy

13 October 2007 11 (12th)	Shrewsbury Town	2–3	Chesterfield	Shrewbury
15:00	Hibbert 5'; Herd (yellow card) 56'; Murdock 68'		Rooney 44'; Lowry 49'; Lester 65' (pen.) (yellow card) 90'; Ward (yellow card) 87'	Stadium: New Meadow; Attendance: 5,143; Referee: Scott Mathieson

20 October 2007 12 (13th)	Bury	1–1	Shrewsbury Town	Bury
15:00	Scott (yellow card) 37' (goal) 45'		Kempson (yellow card) 32'; Drummond 82'; Herd (yellow card) 86'	Stadium: Gigg Lane; Attendance: 2,667; Referee: Mike Jones

27 October 2007 13 (13th)	Shrewsbury Town	0–0	Mansfield Town	Shrewbury
15:00			Mullins (yellow card) 3' (yellow-red card) 45'	Stadium: New Meadow; Attendance: 5,347; Referee: Paul Melin

4 November 2007 14 (11th)	Wrexham	0–1	Shrewsbury Town	Wrexham
12:00	Done (yellow card) 87'; Garrett (yellow card) 90'		Moss (yellow card) 21'; Symes 59' (yellow card) 79'	Stadium: Racecourse Ground; Attendance: 4,305; Referee: Neil Swarbrick

6 November 2007 15 (12th)	Darlington	2–0	Shrewsbury Town	Darlington
19:30	Joachim 27'; Colbeck 63'		Murdock (yellow card) 56'	Stadium: The Darlington Arena; Attendance: 2,628; Referee: Mike Pike

17 November 2007 16 (11th)	Shrewsbury Town	1–0	Barnet	Shrewbury
15:00	Hunt (yellow card) 62'; Hibbert (yellow card) 86'; Symes 90' (yellow card) 90'		Puncheon (yellow card) 49'; Devera (yellow card) 78'; Gillet (yellow card) 87'	Stadium: New Meadow; Attendance: 5,197; Referee: Dean Whitestone

24 November 2007 17 (13th)	Rotherham United	2–0	Shrewsbury Town	Rotherham
15:00	Taylor 38'; Holmes 81'			Stadium: Millmoor; Attendance: 3,832; Referee: Carl Boyeson

1 December 2007 18 (9th)	Shrewsbury Town	2–0	Macclesfield Town	Shrewbury
15:00	Drummond 33'; Hunt 65'		Tolley (yellow card) 26'; McIntyre (yellow card) 54'; Murray (yellow card) 65'	Stadium: New Meadow; Attendance: 4,763; Referee: Keith Stroud

8 December 2007 19 (11th)	Notts County	2–1	Shrewsbury Town	Nottingham
15:00	Pearce 69'; MacKenzie 75'; Silk (yellow card) 27'		Hibbert 41' (pen.); Herd (yellow card) 78'	Stadium: Meadow Lane; Attendance: 3,819; Referee: Nigel Miller

15 December 2007 20 (9th)	Shrewsbury Town	4–0	Dagenham & Redbridge	Shrewbury
15:00	Davies 54', 69'; Hibbert (yellow card) 63'; Pugh 78'; Tierney 81'; Ashton (yellow card) 88'		Sloma (yellow card) 24'; Taiwo (red card) 52'; Nurse (yellow card) 73'; Strevens (yellow card) 90'	Stadium: New Meadow; Attendance: 4,597; Referee: Mike Thorpe

22 December 2007 21 (9th)	Accrington Stanley	1–2	Shrewsbury Town	Accrington
15:00	Mullin 39'; Harris (yellow card) 63'; Branch (yellow card) 66'		Davies 64'; Hibbert 68' (yellow card) 68'; Hunt (yellow card) 81'	Stadium: Crown Ground; Attendance: 1,410; Referee: Jonathan Moss

26 December 2007 22 (9th)	Shrewsbury Town	3–1	Stockport County	Shrewbury
15:00	Tierney (yellow card) 15'; Cooke 22'; Hunt (yellow card) 55'; Davies 76' (yellow card) 81'; Hibbert 86' (pen.)		Owen 16'; Pilkington 72' (yellow card) 77'	Stadium: New Meadow; Attendance: 7,707; Referee: Andy Woolmer

29 December 2007 23 (10th)	Shrewsbury Town	0–1	Wycombe Wanderers	Shrewbury
15:10	Hunt (yellow card) 26'; Ashton (yellow card) 64'		Sutton 8'; Oakes (yellow card) 14'; Daly (yellow card) 89'; Boucaud (yellow card) 90'	Stadium: New Meadow; Attendance: 6,208; Referee: Karl Evans

1 January 2008 24 (11th)	Peterborough United	2–1	Shrewsbury Town	Peterborough
15:00	Day (yellow card) 38'; Lee 52'; Morgan 57' (yellow card) 72'; Newton (yellow card) 77'		Cooke 27'	Stadium: London Road Stadium; Attendance: 5,062; Referee: Paul Armstrong

5 January 2008 25 (12th)	Shrewsbury Town	0–1	Brentford	Shrewbury
15:00	McIntyre (yellow card) 45'		Osborne 52'	Stadium: New Meadow; Attendance: 5,083; Referee: Roger East

13 January 2008 26 (13th)	Hereford United	3–1	Shrewsbury Town	Hereford
14:00	Benjamin 41' (pen.); Beckwith 73'; Johnson 79' (yellow card) 90'; Taylor (yellow card) 80'		Briggs 31'; Herd (yellow card) 74'	Stadium: Edgar Street; Attendance: 4,707; Referee: Mark Haywood

19 January 2008 27 (11th)	Shrewsbury Town	2–0	Morecambe	Shrewbury
15:00	Hall 4'; Madjo 31'; Pugh (yellow card) 57'		Grand (yellow card) 36'; Stanley (yellow card) 57'	Stadium: New Meadow; Attendance: 5,036; Referee: Danny McDermid

26 January 2008 28 (11th)	Grimsby Town	1–1	Shrewsbury Town	Cleethorpes
15:00	Fenton (yellow card) 42'; North 90' (yellow card) 90'		Hall (yellow card) 19'; Murdock (red card) 56'; Madjo 75'	Stadium: Blundell Park; Attendance: 3,785; Referee: Dave Foster

29 January 2008 29 (11th)	Bradford City	4–2	Shrewsbury Town	Bradford
19:45	Nix 7'; Daley 40'; Thorne 57'; Wetherall (yellow card) 65'; Conlon 85' (pen.); Evans (yellow card) 90'		Hibbert 48'; Pugh 65'; Herd (yellow card) 70'; McIntyre (yellow card) 80'	Stadium: Valley Parade; Attendance: 13,269; Referee: Neil Swarbrick

2 February 2008 30 (14th)	Shrewsbury Town	1–2	Lincoln City	Shrewbury
15:00	Langmead (yellow card) 48'; Davies 76'		Dodds 12', 85' (yellow card) 18'; John-Lewis (yellow card) 29'; Kerr (yellow card) 42'; Green (yellow card) 47'	Stadium: New Meadow; Attendance: 4,892; Referee: Pat Miller

9 February 2008 31 (13th)	Brentford	1–1	Shrewsbury Town	Brentford
15:00	Connell 57'		Hibbert (yellow card) 65'; Constable 79'	Stadium: Griffin Park; Attendance: 5,353; Referee: Trevor Kettle

12 February 2008 32 (13th)	Shrewsbury Town	3–3	Milton Keynes Dons	Shrewbury
19:45	Murdock (yellow card) 15'; Langmead 44'; Constable 70', 90'		Johnson (yellow card) 18'; Wright 32', 40'; Gallen 35'; O'Hanlon (yellow card) 52'; Andrews (yellow card) 87'	Stadium: New Meadow; Attendance: 5,474; Referee: Iain Williamson

23 February 2008 34 (16th)	Shrewsbury Town	1–2	Hereford United	Shrewbury
15:00	Hall 6'; Constable (yellow card) 77'		Johnson 27'; Beckwith (yellow card) 39'; Hooper 67'	Stadium: New Meadow; Attendance: 7,402; Referee: Uriah Rennie

1 March 2008 35 (16th)	Barnet	4–1	Shrewsbury Town	London
15:00	Akurang 16', 54'; Adomah 32', 45'; Gillet (yellow card) 89'		Madjo 10'; McIntyre (yellow card) 72'; Tierney (yellow card) 90'	Stadium: The Hive Stadium; Attendance: 1,864; Referee: Keith Hill

8 March 2008 36 (15th)	Shrewsbury Town	1–1	Rotherham United	Shrewbury
15:00	Davies 43'		Mills 37'	Stadium: New Meadow; Attendance: 5,265; Referee: Kevin Friend

11 March 2008 37 (16th)	Shrewsbury Town	0–0	Darlington	Shrewbury
19:45			Miller (yellow card) 45'; Kennedy (yellow card) 61'	Stadium: New Meadow; Attendance: 4,499; Referee: Roger East

15 March 2008 38 (17th)	Macclesfield Town	2–1	Shrewsbury Town	Macclesfield
15:00	Jennings (yellow card) 56'; Walker (yellow card) 75'; Hessey (yellow card) 78'; Tolley 82'; Green 85' (yellow card) 86'		Pugh (yellow card) 40'; Hibbert 65' (yellow card) 79'	Stadium: Moss Rose; Attendance: 2,473; Referee: Neil Swarbrick

22 March 2008 39 (18th)	Dagenham & Redbridge	1–1	Shrewsbury Town	Dagenham
15:00	Benson 70'; Gain (yellow card) 89'		Cooke 34'	Stadium: Victoria Road; Attendance: 1,686; Referee: Carl Boyeson

24 March 2008 40 (18th)	Shrewsbury Town	0–0	Notts County	Shrewbury
15:00				Stadium: New Meadow; Attendance: 5,673; Referee: Andy Haines

29 March 2008 41 (19th)	Shrewsbury Town	0–1	Bury	Shrewbury
15:00	Hibbert (yellow card) 14'; Cooke (yellow card) 48'; Lee (yellow card) 52'		Scott (yellow card) 26'; Buchanan (yellow card) 48'; Adams 71'	Stadium: New Meadow; Attendance: 5,213; Referee: Jarnail Singh

5 April 2008 42 (18th)	Chesterfield	4–1	Shrewsbury Town	Chesterfield
15:00	Fletcher (yellow card) 33'; Dowson (yellow card) 41' (goal) 47', 90'; Ward 50', 59'; Lowry (yellow card) 71'		Lee (yellow card) 9'; McIntyre 81'; Moss (yellow card) 39'	Stadium: Saltergate; Attendance: 3,570; Referee: Darren Drysdale

8 April 2008 33 (14th)	Morecambe	1–1	Shrewsbury Town	Morecambe
19:45	Baker 32'; Blinkhorn (yellow card) 73'; Stanley (yellow card) 74'		Pugh 70' (yellow card) 70'; Herd (yellow card) 73'	Stadium: Christie Park; Attendance: 1,634; Referee: Mike Jones

13 April 2008 43 (17th)	Shrewsbury Town	3–0	Wrexham	Shrewbury
12:00	McIntyre 7'; Davies (yellow card) 34'; Moss 58'; Constable 68'; Hibbert (yellow card) 75'		Spender (yellow card) 17'; Roberts (yellow card) 27'; Broughton (yellow card) 39'; Williams (yellow card) 85'	Stadium: New Meadow; Attendance: 7,065; Referee: Lee Mason

19 April 2008 44 (17th)	Mansfield Town	3–1	Shrewsbury Town	Mansfield
15:00	Boulding 22', 37', 87'		Pugh 2'	Stadium: Field Mill; Attendance: 3,334; Referee: Grant Hegley

26 April 2008 45 (18th)	Shrewsbury Town	0–0	Chester City	Shrewbury
15:00			Ellison (yellow card) 29'; Sandwith (yellow card) 81'	Stadium: New Meadow; Attendance: 6,417; Referee: Rob Styles

3 May 2008 46 (18th)	Rochdale	1–1	Shrewsbury Town	Rochdale
15:00	Hall 34'; Meredith (yellow card) 47'; McIntyre (yellow card) 49'; Pugh (yellow card) 62'		Dagnall 54'; Thompson (yellow card) 70'; Le Fondre (yellow card) 78'; Muirhead (yellow card) 88'	Stadium: Spotland Stadium; Attendance: 4,000; Referee: Anthony Bates

==== League table (part) ====
Pos	Team	Pld	W	D	L	GF	GA	GD	Pts
16	Grimsby Town	46	15	10	21	55	66	−11	55
17	Accrington Stanley	46	16	3	27	49	83	−34	51
18	Shrewsbury Town	46	12	14	20	56	65	−9	50
19	Macclesfield Town	46	11	17	18	47	64	−17	50
20	Dagenham & Redbridge	46	13	10	23	49	70	−21	49

Updated to match(es) played on 3 May 2008. Source: The Football League
Rules for classification: 1) points; 2) goal difference; 3) number of goals scored.

==== Results summary ====
Overall								Home						Away					
Pld	W	D	L	GF	GA	GD	Pts	W	D	L	GF	GA	GD	W	D	L	GF	GA	GD
46	12	14	20	56	65	−9	50	9	6	8	31	22	+9	3	8	12	25	43	−18

=== FA Cup ===
10 November 2007 First round	Walsall	2–0	Shrewsbury Town	Walsall
15:00	Ricketts 10'; Sonko (yellow card) 55'; Demontagnac 66'	Report	Nicholson (yellow card) 46'; Herd (yellow card) 81'	Stadium: Bescot Stadium; Attendance: 4,972; Referee: Ray Lee

=== League Cup ===
14 August 2007 First round	Shrewsbury Town	1–0 (a.e.t.)	Colchester United	Shrewsbury
19:45	Kempson 106'	Report		Stadium: New Meadow; Attendance: 3,069; Referee: Richard Beeby

28 August 2007 Second round	Shrewsbury Town	0–1	Fulham	Shrewsbury
19:45		Report	Pearce (yellow card) 45'; Kamara 59' (yellow card) 68'; Omozusi (yellow card) 90'	Stadium: New Meadow; Attendance: 6,223; Referee: Paul Taylor

=== League Trophy ===
4 September 2007 First round	Yeovil Town	1–0	Shrewsbury Town	Yeovil
19:45	Owusu 53'	Report		Stadium: Huish Park; Attendance: 1,669; Referee: Rob Shoebridge

== Transfers ==
=== In ===
Date	Player	Club	Fee	Ref.
31 July 2007	Colin Murdock	Rotherham United	Free	
1 August 2007	Fola Onibuje	Wycombe Wanderers	Undisclosed	
3 January 2008	Kevin McIntyre	Macclesfield Town	≥£30,000	
11 January 2008	Keith Briggs	Stockport County	Free	
11 January 2008	Guy Madjo	Crawley Town	£20,000	
14 January 2008	James Meredith	Sligo Rovers	Undisclosed	
31 January 2008	James Constable	Kidderminster Harriers	Undisclosed	
31 January 2008	Scott Bevan	Kidderminster Harriers	Undisclosed	
31 May 2008	Stephen Hindmarch	Carlisle United	Free	
31 May 2008	Paul Murray	Gretna	Free	
24 June 2008	Mike Jackson	Blackpool	Free	
24 June 2008	Grant Holt	Nottingham Forest	£170,000	
30 June 2008	Shane Cansdell-Sherriff	Tranmere Rovers	Free	

=== Out ===
Date	Player	Club	Fee	Ref.
20 July 2007	Sagi Burton	Barnet	Released	
1 August 2007	Ross Draper	Stafford Rangers	Free	
10 August 2007	Steven Hogg	Gretna	Undisclosed	
16 August 2007	Derek Asamoah	Nice	£50,000	
31 August 2007	Sean Clancy	N/A	Released	
1 September 2007	Fola Onibuje	St Albans City	Released	
3 January 2008	Stewart Drummond	Morecambe	£15,000	
10 January 2008	Danny Hall	Gretna	Undisclosed	
1 February 2008	Ryan Esson	Hereford United	Released	
20 February 2008	Keith Briggs	Stalybridge Celtic	Released	
17 June 2008	Colin Murdock	Accrington Stanley	Free	
20 May 2008	Chris Mackenzie	Kidderminster Harriers	Released	
31 May 2008	Andy Cooke	N/A	Released	
31 May 2008	Tom Moss	N/A	Released	

=== Loans in ===
Date	Player	Club	Return	Ref.
16 August 2007	Stuart Nicholson	West Bromwich Albion	Recalled 1 January 2008	
19 November 2007	Shane Tudor	Port Vale	Recalled	
25 October 2008	Neil Wainwright	Darlington	One-month	
15 January 2008	Asa Hall	Birmingham City	End of season	
20 March 2008	Graeme Lee	Doncaster Rovers	Recalled 23 April 2008	

== Squad ==
Numbers in parentheses denote appearances as substitute.
Players with squad numbers struck through and marked † left the club during the playing season.
Players with names in italics and marked * were on loan from another club for the whole of their season with Shrewsbury Town.
Key to positions: GK – Goalkeeper; DF – Defender; MF – Midfielder; FW – Forward

Players included in matchday squads
No.	Pos.	Nat.	Name	League		FA Cup		League Cup		League Trophy		Total		Discipline	
No.	Pos.	Nat.	Name	Apps	Goals	Apps	Goals	Apps	Goals	Apps	Goals	Apps	Goals	Booked	Sent off (straight red)
1	GK	WAL	Glyn Garner	41	0	1	0	0	0	0	0	42	0	0	0
2	DF	WAL	Darren Moss	28 (3)	2	1	0	1	0	1	0	31 (3)	2	4	0
3	DF/MF	ENG	Neil Ashton	6 (9)	0	0	0	0	0	1	0	7 (9)	0	2	0
4	DF	ENG	~~Graeme Lee~~ * †	4 (1)	0	0	0	0	0	0	0	4 (1)	0	2	0
4	MF	ENG	~~Stewart Drummond~~ †	22 (1)	3	1	0	1	0	0	0	24 (1)	3	4	0
5	DF	ENG	Darran Kempson	18 (5)	0	0	0	2	1	1	0	21 (5)	1	1	0
6	DF/MF	ENG	David Hunt	22 (5)	2	0	0	1 (1)	0	0	0	23 (6)	2	6	0
7	MF	ENG	Marc Pugh	27 (10)	4	1	0	0	0	0	0	28 (10)	4	4	0
8	DF	ENG	Kelvin Langmead	39	1	1	0	1	0	1	0	42	1	4	0
9	FW	ENG	David Hibbert	36 (8)	12	0	0	1 (1)	0	0	0	37 (9)	12	9	0
10	FW	ENG	James Constable	7 (7)	4	0	0	0	0	0	0	7 (7)	4	1	0
10	FW	ENG	~~Stuart Nicholson~~ * †	6 (8)	1	1	0	0	0	1	0	8 (8)	1	2	0
11	FW	ENG	Michael Symes	12 (9)	3	1	0	2	0	1	0	16 (9)	3	4	0
12	DF	ENG	Ben Herd	42 (3)	0	0 (1)	0	1	0	0 (1)	0	43 (5)	0	7	0
14	MF	ENG	Ben Davies	26 (1)	6	0	0	0	0	0	0	26 (1)	6	2	0
15	DF	ENG	~~Luke Jones~~ †	6 (1)	0	0	0	0	0	0	0	6 (1)	0	0	0
16	DF	ENG	~~Danny Hall~~ †	7 (8)	0	1	0	0 (1)	0	1	0	9 (9)	0	2	0
16	DF/MF	ENG	Asa Hall *	13 (2)	3	0	0	0	0	0	0	13 (2)	3	1	0
17	MF	JAM	Chris Humphrey	7 (18)	0	0	0	2	0	1	0	10 (18)	0	0	0
18	MF	SCO	Steve Leslie	10 (7)	1	1	0	2	0	0 (1)	0	13 (8)	1	0	0
19	FW	CMR	Guy Madjo	10 (5)	3	0	0	0	0	0	0	10 (5)	3	0	0
19	MF	ENG	~~Neil Wainwright~~ * †	2 (1)	0	0	0	0	0	0	0	2 (1)	0	0	0
19	FW	NGA	~~Fola Onibuje~~ †	0	0	0	0	1 (1)	0	0	0	1 (1)	0	0	0
20	FW	ENG	Andy Cooke	10 (4)	5	0	0	0 (1)	0	0	0	10 (5)	5	1	0
21	GK	ENG	Chris Mackenzie	0	0	0	0	0	0	1	0	1	0	0	0
21	GK	ENG	Scott Bevan	5	0	0	0	0	0	0	0	5	0	0	0
22	DF	NIR	~~Colin Murdock~~ †	29	2	1	0	1	0	0	0	31	2	4	1
23	DF	ENG	Marc Tierney	42 (1)	1	1	0	2	0	1	0	46 (1)	1	2	0
24	MF	IRL	~~Jimmy Ryan~~ †	1 (3)	0	0	0	2	0	1	0	4 (3)	0	0	0
25	DF/MF	ENG	~~Keith Briggs~~ †	1 (1)	1	0	0	0	0	0	0	1 (1)	1	0	0
25	MF	ENG	~~Michael Barnes~~ †	2	0	0	0	0	0	0	0	2	0	0	0
25	DF	ENG	Sean Clancy	0	0	0	0	0	0	0	0	0	0	0	0
27	MF	ENG	~~Shane Tudor~~ * †	0	0	0	0	0	0	0	0	0	0	0	0
28	MF	ENG	Kevin McIntyre	22	2	0	0	0	0	0	0	22	2	4	0
31	GK	SCO	Ryan Esson	0	0	0	0	2	0	0	0	2	0	0	0
32	FW	ENG	Tom Moss	0	0	0	0	0	0	0	0	0	0	0	0
33	DF	AUS	James Meredith	3	0	0	0	0	0	0	0	3	0	1	0
—	DF	ENG	~~Martin Riley~~ †	0	0	0	0	0	0	0	0	0	0	0	0

== See also ==
- List of Shrewsbury Town F.C. seasons
