= 2008–09 Shrewsbury Town F.C. season =

Shrewsbury Town F.C.
2008–09 season
- Chairman: Roland Wycherley
- Manager: Paul Simpson
- Ground: New Meadow
- League Two: 7th
- Play-offs: Runners-up
- FA Cup: First round
- League Cup: First round
- Football League Trophy: Southern section semi-final
- Top goalscorer: League: Grant Holt (20); All: Grant Holt (28)
- Biggest win: 7–0 vs Gillingham, League Two, 13 September 2008; 7–0 vs Wycombe Wanderers, League Trophy, 7 October 2008
- Biggest defeat: 0–3 vs Macclesfield Town, League Two, 28 February 2009
Home colours	Away colours	Third colours

The 2008–09 season was the 109th season of competitive association football and 58th season in the Football League played by Shrewsbury Town Football Club, a professional football club based in Shrewsbury, Shropshire, England. Their eighteenth-place finish in 2007–08 meant it was their fifth consecutive season League Two. The season began on 1 July 2008 and concluded on 30 June 2009.

Paul Simpson, starting his first full season as Shrewsbury Town manager, made six permanent summer signings. They finished seventh in the table, and after beating Bury in the play-off semi-final, they lost 1–0 to Gillingham in the final at Wembley Stadium. Shrewsbury lost in their opening round matches in both the 2008–09 FA Cup and the League Cup, and were eliminated in the Southern section semi-final of the Football League Trophy.

32 players made at least one appearance in nationally organised first-team competition, and there were 17 different goalscorers. Grant Holt finished as leading scorer with 28 goals, of which 20 came in league competition, one came in the FA Cup and seven came in the Football League Trophy. Holt was recognised for his contribution to the season receiving the League Two Player of the Year award and was included in the PFA Team of the Year for League Two.

== Match details ==
=== League Two ===
9 August 2008 1	Shrewsbury Town	4–0	Macclesfield Town	Shrewsbury
15:00	Cansdell-Sherriff 31'; Holt 51' (pen.); Coughlan 79'; Hibbert 85'	Report	Hessey (yellow card) 18'; Walker (yellow card) 44'; Yeo (yellow card) 84'	Stadium: New Meadow; Attendance: 5,812; Referee: Phil Gibbs

16 August 2008 2	Exeter City	0–1	Shrewsbury Town	Exeter
15:00		Report	Murray (yellow card) 30' (goal) 71'; Hindmarch (yellow card) 77'	Stadium: St James Park; Attendance: 4,916; Referee: Simon Hooper

23 August 2008 3	Shrewsbury Town	1–0	Aldershot Town	Shrewsbury
15:00	Cansdell-Sherriff (yellow card) 36'; Holt 79' (yellow card) 90'	Report	Charles (yellow card) 57'; Soares (yellow card) 90'	Stadium: New Meadow; Attendance: 5,422; Referee: Trevor Kettle

30 August 2008 4	Notts County	2–2	Shrewsbury Town	Nottingham
15:00	Edwards 39'; Butcher 75'	Report	Moss (yellow card) 45'; Hibbert 47'; McIntyre (yellow card) 54'; Holt (yellow card) 84'; Symes 88'	Stadium: Meadow Lane; Attendance: 4,697; Referee: Graham Horwood

6 September 2008 5	Morecambe	1–0	Shrewsbury Town	Morecambe
15:00	Howe 4'; McCann (yellow card) 86'	Report	Cansdell-Sherriff (yellow card) 41'	Stadium: Christie Park; Attendance: 2,318; Referee: David Webb

13 September 2008 6	Shrewsbury Town	7–0	Gillingham	Shrewsbury
15:00	Jackson 27'; Hibbert 30'; Davies 42', 87'; Coughlan 45'; Cansdell-Sherriff (yellow card) 18', (goal) 52'; Holt (yellow card) 41', (goal) 58' (pen.)	Report	Fuller (yellow card) 41'; Weston (yellow card) 45'; Miller (yellow card) 56'; Daniels (yellow card) 75'	Stadium: New Meadow; Attendance: 5,319; Referee: Christopher Sarginson

21 September 2008 7	Chester City	1–1	Shrewsbury Town	Chester
12:00	Mozika (yellow card) 10'; McManus 43'; Ellison (yellow card) 65'	Report	McIntyre (yellow card) 25'; Holt 29' (pen.); Cansdell-Sherriff (yellow card) 45'; Herd (yellow card) 59'; Jackson (yellow card) 83'	Stadium: Deva Stadium; Attendance: 2,891; Referee: Mark Halsey

27 September 2008 8	Shrewsbury Town	2–0	Bradford City	Shrewsbury
15:00	Davies 6'; Jackson (yellow card) 28'; Herd (yellow card) 61'; Walker 90'	Report	Furman (yellow card) 76'	Stadium: New Meadow; Attendance: 6,517; Referee: Jarnail Singh

4 October 2008 9	Darlington	1–1	Shrewsbury Town	Darlington
15:00	Ravenhill (yellow card) 44'; Kennedy (yellow card) 53'; White 55'; Hatch (yellow card) 70'	Report	Jackson (yellow card) 37'; Coughlan (yellow card) 45'; Holt (yellow card) 55'; Thornton (yellow card) 63', (goal) 71'; Herd (yellow card) 66'	Stadium: The Darlington Arena; Attendance: 2,899; Referee: Christopher Sarginson

11 October 2008 10	Shrewsbury Town	1–2	Port Vale	Shrewsbury
15:00	Symes 89'; Herd (yellow card) 32'	Report	Davidson (yellow card) 11'; Collins (yellow card) 14' (yellow-red card) 90'; Dodds 19'; Griffith (yellow card) 23'; Edwards (yellow card) 30'; Howland (yellow card) 47'; Anyon (yellow card) 76'; Richards 90'	Stadium: New Meadow; Attendance: 7,162; Referee: Darren Deadman

18 October 2008 11	Shrewsbury Town	4–1	Bournemouth	Shrewsbury
15:00	Sigurðsson 22'; Davies 33', 41'; Tierney (yellow card) 45'; McIntyre (yellow card) 66'; Walker 90'	Report	Bradbury (yellow card) 45'; Pearce (yellow card) 54'; Pitman 60'; Ward (yellow card) 69' (yellow-red card) 78'	Stadium: New Meadow; Attendance: 5,738; Referee: Pat Miller

21 October 2008 12	Accrington Stanley	2–1	Shrewsbury Town	Accrington
19:45	Gornell 2'; Mullin 6'; Ryan (yellow card) 59'	Report	Davies 68'; Holt (yellow card) 90'	Stadium: Crown Ground; Attendance: 1,249; Referee: Carl Boyeson

25 October 2008 13	Brentford	1–1	Shrewsbury Town	Brentford
15:00	Poole (yellow card) 15'; Elder (yellow card) 63'; MacDonald 73'; Halls (yellow card) 80'	Report	Sigurðsson (yellow card) 25'; Cansdell-Sherriff (yellow card) 57'; Coughlan (yellow card) 60'; McIntyre (yellow card) 66'; Humphrey 80'	Stadium: Griffin Park; Attendance: 5,362; Referee: David Phillips

28 October 2008 14	Shrewsbury Town	2–2	Barnet	Shrewsbury
19:45	Holt 31'; Davies 33'	Report	O'Flynn 4', 28'	Stadium: New Meadow; Attendance: 5,163; Referee: Andy Penn

1 November 2008 15	Shrewsbury Town	3–0	Luton Town	Shrewsbury
15:00	Murray 4'; Jackson (yellow card) 55'; Davies 76'; Holt 87'; Tierney (yellow card) 90'	Report		Stadium: New Meadow; Attendance: 6,188; Referee: Anthony Taylor

14 November 2008 16	Chesterfield	2–2	Shrewsbury Town	Chesterfield
19:30	Lester (yellow card) 16'; Currie 67'; Ward 72' (pen.)	Report	Holt 45' (pen.), 54'; Walker (yellow card) 45'; Jackson (yellow card) 71'	Stadium: Saltergate; Attendance: 4,099; Referee: Karl Evans

22 November 2008 17	Lincoln City	0–0	Shrewsbury Town	Lincoln
15:00		Report	Walker (red card) 3'	Stadium: Sincil Bank; Attendance: 3,517; Referee: Graham Scott

25 November 2008 18	Shrewsbury Town	2–1	Dagenham & Redbridge	Shrewsbury
19:45	Moss (yellow card) 9'; White 50'; Holt 90' (pen.)	Report	Uddin (yellow card) 11'; Saunders (yellow card) 41' (goal) 78'; Okuonghae (yellow card) 45'; Foster (yellow card) 89'	Stadium: New Meadow; Attendance: 4,590; Referee: Graham Salisbury

6 December 2008 19	Shrewsbury Town	1–0	Rotherham United	Shrewsbury
15:00	Langmead (yellow card) 49'; Holt 72' (yellow card) 86'	Report	Broughton (yellow card) 31' (yellow-red card) 59'; Stockdale (red card) 70'	Stadium: New Meadow; Attendance: 5,314; Referee: Graham Horwood

13 December 2008 20	Grimsby Town	1–0	Shrewsbury Town	Cleethorpes
15:00	Proudlock (yellow card) 16' (goal) 53'	Report	Langmead (yellow card) 50'; Hunt (yellow card) 86'	Stadium: Blundell Park; Attendance: 3,283; Referee: Steve Bratt

20 December 2008 21	Shrewsbury Town	0–1	Wycombe Wanderers	Shrewsbury
15:00	Holt (yellow card) 43'	Report	Hunt (yellow card) 41'; Johnson (yellow card) 47'; Harrold 55'	Stadium: New Meadow; Attendance: 6,160; Referee: Steven Cook

26 December 2008 22	Rochdale	2–1	Shrewsbury Town	Rochdale
15:00	Keltie (yellow card) 21'; Ramsden (yellow card) 30'; McEvilly 67', 83'	Report	Holt 59'	Stadium: Spotland Stadium; Attendance: 4,159; Referee: Dave Foster

28 December 2008 23	Shrewsbury Town	1–0	Bury	Shrewsbury
15:00	Holt 76'	Report	Dawson (yellow card) 15'; Sodje (red card) 38'	Stadium: New Meadow; Attendance: 7,127; Referee: Mark Haywood

3 January 2009 24	Bradford City	0–0	Shrewsbury Town	Bradford
15:00		Report	Murray (yellow card) 71'; Holt (yellow card) 90'	Stadium: Valley Parade; Attendance: 12,877; Referee: Russell Booth

17 January 2009 25	Port Vale	1–1	Shrewsbury Town	Burslem
15:00	Thompson 9'; Perry (red card) 32'; McCombe (yellow card) 45'; Griffith (yellow card) 68'; Prosser (yellow card) 80'	Report	Walker 28'	Stadium: Vale Park; Attendance: 7,068; Referee: Trevor Kettle

24 January 2009 26	Shrewsbury Town	1–0	Darlington	Shrewsbury
15:00	Walker 5'; Ashton (yellow card) 85'; Coughlan (yellow card) 85'	Report	Ravenhill (yellow card) 15' (yellow-red card) 84'; Foster (yellow card) 84'	Stadium: New Meadow; Attendance: 5,140; Referee: Andy Woolmer

27 January 2009 27	Barnet	0–0	Shrewsbury Town	Edgware
19:45	Nicolau (yellow card) 60'; Furlong (yellow card) 90'	Report		Stadium: Underhill Stadium; Attendance: 1,568; Referee: Andy D'Urso

31 January 2009 28	Shrewsbury Town	1–3	Brentford	Shrewsbury
15:00	Ashton (yellow card) 31'; Holt 68'	Report	Rhodes 2', 17', 29'; O'Connor (yellow card) 71'	Stadium: New Meadow; Attendance: 5,674; Referee: Anthony Taylor

3 February 2009 29	Shrewsbury Town	2–0	Accrington Stanley	Shrewsbury
19:45	Coughlan 20'; Holt 40' (pen.); Jackson (yellow card) 70'; Hibbert (yellow card) 90'	Report		Stadium: New Meadow; Attendance: 4,134; Referee: Karl Evans

7 February 2009 30	Bournemouth	1–0	Shrewsbury Town	Bournemouth
15:00	Pitman 23'; Cooper (yellow card) 81'	Report	Jackson (yellow card) 45'; Cansdell-Sherriff (yellow card) 86'; Coughlan (yellow card) 90'; Holt (yellow card) 90'; Moss (red card) 90'	Stadium: Dean Court; Attendance: 4,187; Referee: Richard Beeby

14 February 2009 31	Shrewsbury Town	2–1	Chesterfield	Shrewsbury
15:00	Jackson 19'; Davies 53' (yellow card) 90'	Report	Boden 26'; McDonald (yellow card) 75'	Stadium: New Meadow; Attendance: 4,873; Referee: James Linington

17 February 2009 32	Shrewsbury Town	1–0	Chester City	Shrewsbury
19:45	Walker 57'	Report	Vaughan (yellow card) 18'; Partridge (yellow card) 69'; Harris (red card) 79'	Stadium: New Meadow; Attendance: 6,133; Referee: Scott Mathieson

21 February 2009 33	Luton Town	3–1	Shrewsbury Town	Luton
15:00	Craddock 15'; Parkin 35'; Hall 73'; Davis (yellow card) 90'	Report	Davis 20'; Humphrey (yellow card) 71'	Stadium: Kenilworth Road; Attendance: 5,661; Referee: Craig Pawson

28 February 2009 34	Macclesfield Town	3–0	Shrewsbury Town	Macclesfield
15:00	Cansdell-Sherriff 21' (o.g.); Hadfield (yellow card) 51'; Evans 53' (pen.); Hessey (yellow card) 58'; Yeo (yellow card) 61'; Brown 90'	Report	Herd (yellow card) 53'	Stadium: Moss Rose; Attendance: 2,553; Referee: Kevin Friend

3 March 2009 35	Shrewsbury Town	1–1	Exeter City	Shrewsbury
19:45	Holt (yellow card) 10' (goal) 51' (pen.); Murray (yellow card) 64'	Report	Gill (yellow card) 59'; Stewart 83'	Stadium: New Meadow; Attendance: 4,679; Referee: Iain Williamson

7 March 2009 36	Shrewsbury Town	3–2	Notts County	Shrewsbury
15:00	Ashikodi 20'; Holt 38' (pen.); Coughlan 71'	Report	Butcher 16'; Clapham (yellow card) 28'; Facey (yellow card) 37'; Forte 85'	Stadium: New Meadow; Attendance: 5,192; Referee: Dean Whitestone

10 March 2009 37	Aldershot Town	0–0	Shrewsbury Town	Aldershot
19:45	Day (yellow card) 90'; Jaimez-Ruiz (yellow card) 90'	Report	Worrall (yellow card) 32'; Moss (yellow card) 34'	Stadium: Recreation Ground; Attendance: 2,090; Referee: Gavin Ward

14 March 2009 38	Gillingham	2–2	Shrewsbury Town	Gillingham
15:00	Weston 4'; Southall 51'	Report	Holt 79' (pen.), 90'; Leslie (yellow card) 78'	Stadium: Priestfield Stadium; Attendance: 6,023; Referee: Graham Horwood

21 March 2009 39	Shrewsbury Town	0–0	Morecambe	Shrewsbury
15:00	Ashikodi (yellow card) 26'; Moss (yellow card) 82'	Report	Hunter (yellow card) 10'; Howe (yellow card) 89'	Stadium: New Meadow; Attendance: 5,426; Referee: Oliver Langford

28 March 2009 40	Wycombe Wanderers	1–1	Shrewsbury Town	High Wycombe
12:15	Gary Holt 29'	Report	Coughlan (yellow card) 9'; Davies 75'	Stadium: Adams Park; Attendance: 4,803; Referee: Grant Hegley

4 April 2009 41	Shrewsbury Town	1–1	Grimsby Town	Shrewsbury
15:00	Davies 58'; Murray (yellow card) 74'	Report	Conlon 55'; Llewellyn (yellow card) 76'; Hegarty (yellow card) 90'; Stockdale (yellow card) 90'	Stadium: New Meadow; Attendance: 5,535; Referee: Jarnail Singh

10 April 2009 42	Bury	2–1	Shrewsbury Town	Bury
15:00	Jevons 45' (pen.); Futcher (yellow card) 56'; Sodje (yellow card) 58'; Hurst 80'	Report	Chadwick 55'; Coughlan (yellow card) 61'	Stadium: Gigg Lane; Attendance: 4,850; Referee: Anthony Bates

13 April 2009 43	Shrewsbury Town	1–1	Rochdale	Shrewsbury
15:00	Holt 47'; Hibbert (yellow card) 78'; Leslie (yellow card) 84'	Report	Dagnall (yellow card) 42' (goal) 73'; Thompson (yellow card) 67'; Thorpe (yellow card) 74'; Stanton (yellow card) 82'	Stadium: New Meadow; Attendance: 6,234; Referee: Roger East

18 April 2009 44	Rotherham United	1–2	Shrewsbury Town	Rotherham
15:00	Taylor 70'; Harrison (yellow card) 74'	Report	Chadwick 44'; Sharps 76' (o.g.)	Stadium: Don Valley Stadium; Attendance: 3,106; Referee: David Webb

25 April 2009 45	Shrewsbury Town	0–0	Lincoln City	Shrewsbury
15:00	Murray (yellow card) 14'; Holt (yellow card) 90'	Report	Hutchinson (yellow card) 42'; Swaibu (yellow card) 44'; Kovács (yellow card) 54'	Stadium: New Meadow; Attendance: 6,740; Referee: Andy Haines

2 May 2009 46	Dagenham & Redbridge	1–2	Shrewsbury Town	Dagenham
15:00	Benson 53'; Taiwo (yellow card) 77'	Report	Holt 19'; Humphrey 33'; Daniels (yellow card) 90'	Stadium: Victoria Road; Attendance: 4,791; Referee: Kevin Friend

=== League table (part) ===
Pos	Team	Pld	W	D	L	GF	GA	GD	Pts	Promotion, qualification or relegation
5	Gillingham (O, P)	46	21	12	13	58	55	+3	75	Qualification for League Two play-offs
6	Rochdale	46	19	13	14	70	59	+11	70	Qualification for League Two play-offs
7	Shrewsbury Town	46	17	18	11	61	44	+17	69	Qualification for League Two play-offs
8	Dagenham & Redbridge	46	19	11	16	77	53	+24	68	
9	Bradford City	46	18	13	15	66	55	+11	67	

Source: The Football League
Rules for classification: 1) points; 2) goal difference; 3) number of goals scored.
(O) Play-off winners; (P) Promoted

=== FA Cup ===
8 November 2008 First round	Blyth Spartans	3–1	Shrewsbury Town	Blyth
14:00	Reay 1', 29'; Leeson 63'; Dale (yellow card) 73'	Report	Murray (yellow card) 13'; Holt 68'; Herd (yellow card) 74'; Hindmarch (yellow card) 82'; Coughlan (yellow card) 84'	Stadium: Croft Park; Attendance: 2,742; Referee: Neil Swarbrick

=== League Cup ===
12 August 2008 First round	Shrewsbury Town	0–1	Carlisle United	Shrewsbury
19:45	Holt (yellow card) 58'	Report	Murphy 41'	Stadium: New Meadow; Attendance: 3,337; Referee: Karl Evans

=== League Trophy ===
2 September 2008 First round	Exeter City	1–2	Shrewsbury Town	Exeter
19:45	Moxey (yellow card) 11'; Harley 22'	Report	McIntyre 9'; Davies 90'	Stadium: St James Park; Attendance: 1,530; Referee: Steve Bratt

7 October 2008 Second round	Wycombe Wanderers	0–7	Shrewsbury Town	High Wycombe
19:00	Zebroski (yellow card) 85'; McGleish (yellow card) 90'	Report	Holt 12', 27', 80', 81', 86'; McIntyre 39'; Cansdell-Sherriff 74'	Stadium: Adams Park; Attendance: 1,730; Referee: Andy Woolmer

4 November 2008 Quarter-final	Shrewsbury Town	5–0	Dagenham & Redbridge	Shrewsbury
19:00	Holt (yellow card) 8' (goal) 13', 45'; Leslie 22'; Walker 69'; Coughlan 81'	Report	Okuonghae (yellow card) 88'	Stadium: New Meadow; Attendance: 2,747; Referee: Andy Hall

16 December 2008 Semi-final	Shrewsbury Town	0–0 (4–5 p)	Brighton & Hove Albion	Shrewsbury
19:45		Report	Elphick (yellow card) 44'; Virgo (yellow card) 69'; Hinshelwood (yellow card) 89'	Stadium: New Meadow; Attendance: 4,052; Referee: Keith Hill
	Penalties
	Davies (penalty scored); McIntyre (penalty scored); Leslie (penalty scored); Cansdell-Sherriff (penalty scored); Holt (penalty missed)		(penalty scored) Forster; (penalty scored) Virgo; (penalty scored) Elphick; (penalty scored) Robinson; (penalty scored) Richards

=== League Two play-offs ===
7 May 2009 Semi-final first leg	Shrewsbury Town	0–1	Bury	Shrewsbury
19:45	Moss (yellow card) 27'	Report	Sodje (yellow card) 29'; Ashton 81' (o.g.); Bishop (yellow card) 90'	Stadium: New Meadow; Attendance: 8,429; Referee: Graham Laws

10 May 2009 Semi-final second leg	Bury	0–1 (a.e.t.) (1–1 agg.) (3–4 p)	Shrewsbury Town	Bury
12:00	Bennett (yellow card) 37'; Futcher (yellow card) 45'; Dawson (yellow card) 86'; Sodje (yellow card) 90'	Report	McIntyre 88'; Leslie (red card) 91'; Davies (yellow card) 101'	Stadium: Gigg Lane; Attendance: 7,673; Referee: Colin Webster
	Penalties
	Barry-Murphy (penalty scored); Jones (penalty scored); Racchi (penalty missed); Bennett (penalty scored); Bishop (penalty missed)		(penalty scored) Davies; (penalty scored) Ashikodi; (penalty scored) McIntyre; (penalty scored) Worrall

23 May 2019 Final	Gillingham	1–0	Shrewsbury Town	London
15:00	Weston (yellow card) 53'; Jackson 90'	Report	Coughlan (yellow card) 53'; Murray (yellow card) 54'; Holt (yellow card) 60'	Stadium: Wembley Stadium; Attendance: 53,706; Referee: Clive Oliver

== Transfers ==
=== In ===
Date	Player	Club	Fee	Ref.
23 May 2008	Stephen Hindmarch	Carlisle United	Free	
23 May 2008	Paul Murray	Gretna	Fre	
24 June 2008	Michael Jackson	Blackpool	Free	
24 June 2008	Grant Holt	Nottingham Forest	£170,000	
30 June 2008	Shane Cansdell-Sherriff	Tranmere Rovers	Free	
31 July 2008	Graham Coughlan	Rotherham United	Undisclosed	

=== Out ===
Date	Player	Club	Fee	Ref.
18 July 2008	Darran Kempson	Wrexham	Free	
6 August 2008	Jimmy Ryan	Accrington Stanley	Free	
25 September 2008	Scott Bevan	Torquay United	Free	
1 January 2009	Guy Madjo	Guangdong Sunray Cave	Released	
2 January 2009	Marc Tierney	Colchester United	Undisclosed	
10 January 2009	David Hunt	Brentford	Released	
31 May 2009	David Maguire	—	Released	

=== Loans in ===
Date	Player	Club	Return	Ref.
4 July 2008	Richard Walker	Bristol Rovers	End of season	
1 August 2008	Luke Daniels	West Bromwich Albion	End of season	
12 September 2008	Sean Thornton	Leyton Orient	One-month	
16 October 2008	Gylfi Sigurðsson	Reading	One-month	
14 November 2008	Jamie White	Southampton	4 January 2009	
21 November 2008	Matt Gilks	Blackpool	One-month	
1 January 2009	Joss Labadie	West Bromwich Albion	6 January 2009	
24 February 2009	David Worrall	West Bromwich Albion	End of season	

== Squad ==
Numbers in parentheses denote appearances as substitute.
Players with squad numbers struck through and marked † left the club during the playing season.
Players with names in italics and marked * were on loan from another club for the whole of their season with Shrewsbury Town.
Key to positions: GK – Goalkeeper; DF – Defender; MF – Midfielder; FW – Forward

Players included in matchday squads
No.	Pos.	Nat.	Name	League		FA Cup		League Cup		Other (Note: Includes Football League Trophy and Football League Two play-offs.)		Total		Discipline	
No.	Pos.	Nat.	Name	Apps	Goals	Apps	Goals	Apps	Goals	Apps	Goals	Apps	Goals	Booked	Sent off (straight red)
1	GK	WAL	Glyn Garner	4	0	1	0	0	0	2	0	7	0	0	0
2	DF	WAL	Darren Moss	28 (1)	0	0	0	1	0	5	0	34 (1)	0	5	1
3	DF/MF	ENG	Neil Ashton	24 (7)	0	0	0	0	0	4 (2)	0	28 (9)	0	2	0
4	DF	ENG	Michael Jackson	21	2	1	0	1	0	0	0	23	2	7	0
5	DF	IRL	Graham Coughlan	42	4	1	0	1	0	6	1	50	5	8	0
6	MF	CAN	Terry Dunfield	15 (1)	0	0	0	0	0	0	0	15 (1)	0	0	0
~~6~~ †	DF/MF	ENG	David Hunt	0 (2)	0	0 (1)	0	0	0	1	0	1 (3)	0	1	0
7	MF	ENG	Marc Pugh	0 (7)	0	0	0	0	0	0 (1)	0	0 (8)	0	0	0
8	DF	ENG	Kelvin Langmead	29 (4)	0	0	0	0 (1)	0	7	0	36 (5)	0	2	0
9	FW	ENG	David Hibbert	9 (13)	3	0	0	0 (1)	0	1 (1)	0	10 (15)	3	2	0
~~10~~ †	FW	ENG	James Constable	0	0	0	0	0	0	0	0	0	0	0	0
11	FW	ENG	Michael Symes	1 (7)	2	0 (1)	0	0	0	1 (1)	0	2 (9)	2	0	0
12	DF	ENG	Ben Herd	20 (1)	0	1	0	1	0	3	0	25 (1)	0	6	0
14	MF	ENG	Ben Davies	42	12	0	0	1	0	6	1	49	13	2	0
15	MF	ENG	Paul Murray	31 (1)	2	1	0	0	0	3	0	35 (1)	2	7	0
16	FW	ENG	Grant Holt	43	20	1	1	1	0	6	7	51	28	14	0
17	MF	JAM	Chris Humphrey	24 (13)	2	1	0	0 (1)	0	4	0	29 (14)	2	1	0
18	MF	SCO	Steven Leslie	12 (15)	0	1	0	0	0	1 (4)	1	14 (19)	1	2	1
~~19~~ †	MF	ENG	Joss Labadie*	1	0	0	0	0	0	0	0	1	0	0	0
~~19~~ †	FW	CMR	Guy Madjo	0	0	0	0	0	0	0	0	0	0	0	0
20	FW	ENG	Stephen Hindmarch	0 (3)	0	0 (1)	0	0	0	1 (1)	0	1 (5)	0	2	0
~~21~~ †	FW	ENG	Nick Chadwick	9 (6)	2	0	0	0	0	2 (1)	0	11 (7)	2	0	0
~~21~~ †	GK	ENG	Scott Bevan	0	0	0	0	0	0	0	0	0	0	0	0
~~23~~ †	DF	ENG	Marc Tierney	18	0	1	0	1	0	2	0	22	0	2	0
23	MF	ENG	David Worrall*	7 (2)	0	0	0	0	0	1 (2)	0	8 (4)	0	1	0
24	DF	AUS	Shane Cansdell-Sherriff	27 (4)	2	0	0	1	0	3	1	31 (4)	3	6	0
25	FW	ENG	Richard Walker*	16 (11)	5	1	0	1	0	2 (1)	1	20 (12)	6	1	1
26	GK	ENG	Luke Daniels*	38	0	0	0	1	0	5	0	44	0	1	0
~~27~~ †	MF	IRL	Sean Thornton*	5	1	0	0	0	0	1	0	6	1	1	0
~~27~~ †	FW	ENG	Jamie White*	3 (6)	1	0	0	0	0	1	0	4 (6)	1	0	0
28	MF	ENG	Kevin McIntyre	25 (1)	0	1	0	1	0	7	3	34 (1)	3	4	0
~~29~~ †	FW	ATG	Moses Ashikodi	4 (3)	1	0	0	0	0	0 (2)	0	4 (5)	1	1	0
~~29~~ †	MF	ISL	Gylfi Sigurðsson*	4 (1)	1	0	0	0	0	1	0	5 (1)	1	1	0
30	GK	IRL	David Maguire	0	0	0	0	0	0	0	0	0	0	0	0
~~31~~ †	GK	SCO	Matt Gilks*	4	0	0	0	0	0	0	0	4	0	0	0
31	FW	TUR	Omer Riza	0 (2)	0	0	0	0	0	1 (2)	0	1 (4)	0	0	0
33	DF	AUS	James Meredith	0	0	0	0	0	0	0	0	0	0	0	0
