= George Daly =

George Daly may refer to:

- George Daly (baseball) (1887–1957), professional baseball player
- George Daly (footballer) (born 1990), English football forward
- George Daly (music executive), music executive, songwriter, musician and producer

== See also ==
- St George Daly (1758–1829), lawyer
- George Daley (disambiguation)
