= George Daley =

George Daley may refer to:

- George W. Daley (1875–1952), American newspaper editor, sports writer, and syndicated author of fictional baseball stories and poetry
- George Q. Daley, dean of Harvard Medical School

== See also ==
- George Daly (disambiguation)
