= Paul Tierney (footballer) =

English-born Irish footballer

Personal information
- Full name: Paul Thomas Tierney
- Date of birth: 15 September 1982 (age 44)
- Place of birth: Salford, England
- Height: 5 ft 10 in (1.78 m)
- Position: Left-back

Youth career
- 1999–2000: Manchester United

Senior career*
Years	Team	Apps	(Gls)
2000–2005	Manchester United	0	(0)
2002–2003	→ Crewe Alexandra (loan)	14	(1)
2004	→ Colchester United (loan)	2	(0)
2004–2005	→ Bradford City (loan)	14	(0)
2005–2006	Livingston	25	(0)
2006–2008	Blackpool	10	(0)
2007–2008	→ Stockport County (loan)	16	(0)
2008–2009	Altrincham	3	(0)
Total		84	(1)

International career
2002–2003	Republic of Ireland U21	7	(0)
- * Club domestic league appearances and goals

Paul Thomas Tierney (born 15 September 1982) is a former professional footballer who played as a left-back. His brother Marc is also a former professional footballer. Born in England, he represented the Republic of Ireland U21 team.

== Club career ==
Born in Salford, Greater Manchester, Tierney signed for Manchester United as a trainee in July 1999 and as a professional 12 months later. He was loaned out to Crewe Alexandra (where he scored his first career goal against Blackpool), Colchester United, and Bradford City. He made his senior debut for Manchester United on 3 December 2003 against West Bromwich Albion in the League Cup. He signed for Livingston on 16 June 2005 having been released by Manchester United, but failed to impress in his first season at the club and they were relegated from the Scottish Premier League. He joined Blackpool on 2 June 2006 on a free transfer.

In July 2007, Blackpool manager Simon Grayson allowed Tierney to join Stockport County in a six-month loan deal. At Stockport he scored once against Macclesfield in the Football League Trophy. Tierney returned to Blackpool in January 2008, and in May 2008, he was released by the club. In September 2008 he signed for Conference National club Altrincham. However, he left the club after less than a month.

== International career ==
Tierney made his debut for the Republic of Ireland under-21s against Italy in the 2002 Toulon Tournament. He made three appearances during Ireland's qualifying campaign for the 2004 UEFA European Under-21 Championship, with his last cap coming in the draw with Georgia in March 2003.

== Personal life ==
Paul is the brother of former Bolton Wanderers player Marc Tierney. His career was eulogised in the song 'The Ballad of Paul Tierney' by the Lonely Tourist.

== Honours ==
Blackpool

- League One play-off final winner 2006–07

Individual

- Jimmy Murphy Young Player of the Year (1): 2001–02
