= David Hibbert =

English footballer (born 1986)

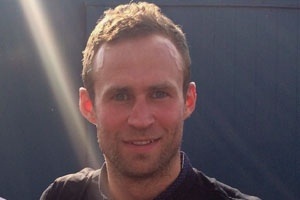
- Hibbert in 2014

Personal information
- Full name: David John Hibbert
- Date of birth: 28 January 1986 (age 40)
- Place of birth: Eccleshall, England
- Height: 6 ft 2 in (1.88 m)
- Position: Forward

Team information
- Current team: Wycombe Wanderers (set-piece coach)

Youth career
- 1995–2004: Port Vale

Senior career*
Years	Team	Apps	(Gls)
2004–2005	Port Vale	9	(2)
2005–2007	Preston North End	10	(0)
2006–2007	→ Rotherham United (loan)	21	(2)
2007	→ Bradford City (loan)	8	(0)
2007–2010	Shrewsbury Town	104	(29)
2010–2013	Peterborough United	7	(1)
2013–2014	Nuneaton Town	28	(4)
2014–2015	Tamworth	35	(8)
2015–2017	AFC Telford United	59	(7)
Total		281	(53)
- * Club domestic league appearances and goals

David John Hibbert (born 28 January 1986) is an English former footballer who played as a forward; he is now working as a set-piece coach at EFL League One club Wycombe Wanderers.

Starting his professional career with Port Vale in 2004, the following year he was signed controversially by Preston North End – who eventually paid Vale £45,000 for his services. Following loans out to Rotherham United and Bradford City, he transferred to Shrewsbury Town in 2007 for £75,000. He managed to become a key first-team player for the "Shrews" before leaving them for Peterborough United in 2010. After picking up a serious injury in November 2010, he did not play a competitive game and announced his retirement from football in April 2013. He returned to the game with Nuneaton Town in October 2013 on a part-time basis before moving on to Tamworth in June 2014. He joined AFC Telford United in June 2015 before retiring at the end of the 2016–17 season.

== Playing career ==
=== Port Vale ===
Born in Eccleshall, Staffordshire, Hibbert started his career at League One Port Vale, rising through the ranks from the age of nine years old. He made three starts and seven substitute appearances in first season with Vale; and his promising maiden season was restricted only by a head injury sustained at Milton Keynes Dons. His two goals for the club both came in his second starting appearance in a 3–1 win over Luton Town on 26 February 2005. In June 2005, Championship side Preston North End signed him to a contract. As Hibbert was under the age of 23, the fee was decided by a tribunal according to UEFA regulations. Preston were ordered to pay Port Vale £35,000 upfront with add ons of £10,000 for each 10 of his first 50 appearances for Preston (Vale would only receive the first of these due to him only making 13 appearances in total for Preston); a £280,000 bonus if Preston achieved promotion to the Premiership; plus a 25% sell-on clause if Hibbert was sold on. Vale chairman Bill Bratt was highly disappointed with the news and stated: "I believe he has potential, and he is worth a lot more than we have ended up with." Meanwhile, Preston manager Billy Davies stated that: "We are very fortunate to get this young lad because there were several clubs interested. We think his finishing is very good and – like David Nugent – he is very quick, but to be honest I think he is quite a way from first-team action."

=== Preston North End ===
He started just one game for Preston in 2005–06, playing the full ninety minutes of a 1–1 draw with Crystal Palace in the FA Cup. The young striker squandered numerous chances to win the tie. He also made twelve substitute appearances in both league and cup competitions.

In July 2006 he joined Rotherham United on a six-month loan. He played 22 times for the "Millers", scoring two goals. Returning to Deepdale in January 2007, he was immediately loaned out to Bradford City on a one-month deal. He made his City debut in their 1–0 win against his old club Port Vale at Vale Park on 6 January. The loan was later extended, keeping him at Valley Parade until April 2007. During his prolonged stay at Valley Parade, however, Hibbert suffered an ankle injury on 28 February and did not feature again for the "Bantams" after tests revealed he had ruptured ligaments. He remained at Bradford for a further month so that caretaker manager David Wetherall could see if the injury improved, before he returned to Preston in April.

=== Shrewsbury Town ===
In May 2007, having never started a league game for North End, Hibbert was transfer listed. The next month he was sold to League Two side Shrewsbury Town for a nominal £75,000 fee. He hoped Shrewsbury could improve his game. He scored the first goal at Shrewsbury's New Meadow stadium, in a pre-season friendly, his first match in "Shrews" colours. Along with this, he was also the first ever league goalscorer at New Meadow, scoring a penalty against former club Bradford on 18 August. His strong performances that month earned him a nomination for the division's Player of the Month award, though he lost out to Morecambe defender Jim Bentley. With four goals in five games in September he was a contender for the award for a second-successive month, though this time he lost out to Hereford United's Trevor Benjamin. Despite suffering from a hamstring injury in mid-season, Hibbert finished the 2007–08 season as Shrewsbury's top goalscorer with twelve goals in 46 games. His goals were crucial in helping the club to avoid relegation out of the Football League.

Following a solid start to the 2008–09 campaign, Hibbert was sidelined with a broken nose picked up in training, before failing to start a game between October and March due to a foot injury. He finished the season having scored just three goals in 25 appearances. He spent the following summer undertaking physiotherapy sessions to cure his long-standing foot injury.

Hibbert started the 2009–10 season in fantastic form, building a strong partnership with Nathan Elder. A brief spell on the sidelines through an Achilles injury slowed up his impressive flurry of goals. He then scored five on the trot against Macclesfield Town, Bradford City, Chesterfield, Burton Albion and Dagenham & Redbridge; eventually hitting six goals in eight games. Though he suffered a groin injury late in the season and missed out on his target of twenty goals, his 15 goals made him Shrewsbury's top goalscorer for the second time in three seasons earned him the club's Player of the Year award.

=== Peterborough United ===
He turned down a new contract with Shrewsbury, and instead signed a three-year deal with Peterborough United in May 2010, becoming Gary Johnson's first signing as manager of Peterborough. Hibbert scored his first goal for the club on 11 September 2010, in a 5–2 win over Oldham Athletic. This was his only goal of the season, as he started just one Football League Trophy game. He was limited to eleven substitute appearances in other competitions thanks to injury and the form of other players. The success of Aaron McLean and Craig Mackail-Smith's strike partnership restricted to a cameo role in the club's promotion out of League One, before a serious knee injury sustained in November kept him sidelined for eight months and threatened to end his whole career. The injury caused him to miss the entirety of the 2011–12 and 2012–13 seasons. He announced his retirement from football in April 2013.

=== Non-League ===
In October 2013, Hibbert made a return to playing football in the Conference Premier with Nuneaton Town after joining on non-contract terms. He went on to feature 28 times for Brian Reid's "Boro" in the 2013–14 season, scoring four goals.

In June 2014, Hibbert signed a contract with Conference North side Tamworth, and was joined at the club on the same day by former Nuneaton Town colleagues Kevin Thornton and Danny Sleath. On 21 March, Hibbert scored his first hat-trick for the club in a 3–1 win over local rivals Hednesford Town. He finished the 2014–15 season with eight goals in 35 league games.

Hibbert joined AFC Telford United in June 2015, and also began coaching the Stoke City under-21s. However, he admitted that Telford's poor form hurt him as they finished just one point above the relegation zone at the end of the 2015–16 season. He hit two goals in 29 games in the 2016–17 campaign as the "Bucks" posted a 17th-place finish.

== Coaching career ==
Hibbert went into coaching after retiring as a player, and by April 2019 was the head coach of the under-15's and under-16's at the Stoke City Academy. In June 2023, he was promoted to under-18 lead coach. He took over as under-21 lead coach in January 2025. Hibbert left Stoke in November 2025 to become set-piece coach at Wycombe Wanderers.

== Personal life ==
In May 2013, he was studying for a sports science degree at Loughborough University, taking his UEFA B coaching badge, and playing cricket for Eccleshall.

== Career statistics ==
Appearances and goals by club, season and competition
Club	Season	League			FA Cup		League Cup		Other		Total	
Club	Season	Division	Apps	Goals	Apps	Goals	Apps	Goals	Apps	Goals	Apps	Goals
Port Vale	2004–05	League One	9	2	0	0	0	0	1 (Note: Appearance(s) in the EFL Trophy)	0	10	2
Preston North End	2005–06	Championship	10	0	3	0	0	0	—		13	0
Preston North End	2006–07	Championship	0	0	0	0	0	0	—		0	0
Preston North End	Total		10	0	3	0	0	0	0	0	13	0
Rotherham United (loan)	2006–07	League One	21	2	0	0	1	0	0	0	22	2
Bradford City (loan)	2006–07	League One	8	0	0	0	0	0	0	0	8	0
Shrewsbury Town	2007–08	League Two	44	12	0	0	2	0	0	0	46	12
Shrewsbury Town	2008–09	League Two	22	3	0	0	1	0	2	0	25	3
Shrewsbury Town	2009–10	League Two	38	14	1	0	1	1	0	0	40	15
Shrewsbury Town	Total		104	29	1	0	4	1	2	0	111	30
Peterborough United	2010–11	League One	7	1	2	0	2	0	1	0	12	1
Peterborough United	2011–12	Championship	0	0	0	0	0	0	—		0	0
Peterborough United	2012–13	Championship	0	0	0	0	0	0	—		0	0
Peterborough United	Total		7	1	2	0	2	0	1	0	12	1
Nuneaton Town	2013–14	Conference Premier	28	4	0	0	—		0	0	28	4
Tamworth	2014–15	Conference North	35	8	2	0	—		0	0	37	8
AFC Telford United	2015–16	National League North	31	5	0	0	—		0	0	31	5
AFC Telford United	2016–17	National League North	28	2	0	0	—		1 (Note: Appearance(s) in the FA Trophy)	0	29	2
AFC Telford United	Total		59	7	0	0	0	0	1	0	60	7
Career total			281	53	8	0	7	1	5	0	301	54

== Honours ==
Individual

- Shrewsbury Town Player of the Year: 2010
