= Colin Murdock =

Northern Irish footballer (born 1975)

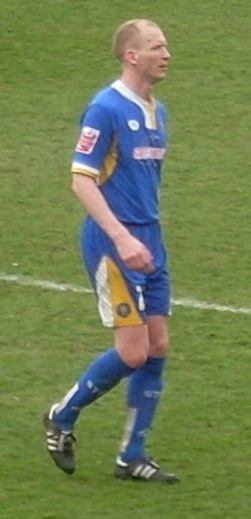
- Murdock playing for Shrewsbury Town

Personal information
- Full name: Colin James Murdock
- Date of birth: 2 July 1975 (age 51)
- Place of birth: Ballymena, Northern Ireland
- Height: 6 ft 3 in (1.91 m)
- Position: Defender

Youth career
- 1991–1994: Manchester United

Senior career*
Years	Team	Apps	(Gls)
1994–1997	Manchester United	0	(0)
1997–2003	Preston North End	180	(6)
2003–2005	Hibernian	37	(3)
2005	Crewe Alexandra	16	(0)
2005–2007	Rotherham United	43	(2)
2007–2008	Shrewsbury Town	29	(2)
2008–2009	Accrington Stanley	23	(1)
Total		328	(14)

International career
1996–1998	Northern Ireland B	3	(0)
2000–2006	Northern Ireland	34	(1)
- * Club domestic league appearances and goals

Colin James Murdock (born 2 July 1975) is a former association football player, who played for clubs including Preston North End, Hibernian and Rotherham United, and for Northern Ireland.

He is now a lawyer, and a member of The Football Association's Football Judicial Panel.

== Playing career ==
=== Club ===
A former Northern Ireland international, Murdock started his career as an apprentice at Manchester United on leaving Ballymena Academy in 1991. He featured in the youth side that were FA Youth Cup runners-up in 1993 and turned professional a year later, but never played a first team game for the club and was transferred to Preston for £165,000 in May 1997.

Murdock made more than 200 league and cup appearances while at Deepdale, collecting a Division Two title medal in 2000 and featuring in the side that reached the Division One playoff final in 2001 (losing 3–0 to Bolton Wanderers) before moving to Scottish club Hibernian in 2003. This gave him the long-awaited chance to experience top division football. During his time at Easter Road, he scored the winning goal in a penalty shootout against Rangers in a Scottish League Cup semi-final.

Murdock joined Crewe in the latter part of 2004–05. He skippered the team and his form helped to steer them clear of relegation. In summer 2005, Murdock signed for Rotherham, where he captained the team and brought experience to the centre of the Rotherham defence, making 43 league appearances in two seasons, scoring twice. At the end of the 2006–07 season after a season blighted by injuries he left Rotherham. Following a brief trial period he signed a one-year contract with Shrewsbury. He made 29 league appearances and scored two goals for the Shrews, but was released by new manager Paul Simpson on 29 April 2008.

On 16 May 2008, Murdock signed a one-year deal with Accrington Stanley . He scored his first and only goal for Accrington in a 2–1 defeat to Barnet on 4 October 2008.

At the end of season 2008/09, Murdock retired from professional football after 17 years and 417 appearances.

=== International career ===
Murdock earned 34 caps for Northern Ireland. He scored one goal, a powerful header, in a 3–3 draw against Austria in 2004.

== Legal career ==
Murdock studied for a law degree at Manchester Metropolitan University, graduating in 2000. After retiring from professional football, he started a new career as a sports lawyer. After postgraduate legal studies at Leeds Beckett University, he was a trainee solicitor with Manchester law firm George Davies LLP, and after qualifying in 2011 joined another Manchester firm, Pannone, while also setting up his own business, Murdock Sports Management. He was also a member of The Football Association's Football Judicial Panel.

== Honours ==
Preston North End

- Football League Second Division: 1999–2000
