= David Hunt (footballer, born 1982) =

English footballer

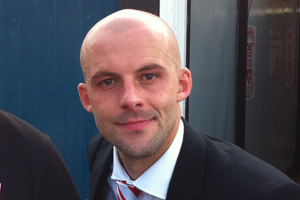
- Hunt in 2011

Personal information
- Full name: David John Hunt
- Date of birth: 10 September 1982 (age 44)
- Place of birth: Dulwich, England
- Height: 5 ft 11 in (1.80 m)
- Positions: Midfielder; defender

Youth career
- 1999–2002: Crystal Palace

Senior career*
Years	Team	Apps	(Gls)
2002–2003	Crystal Palace	2	(0)
2003–2005	Leyton Orient	65	(1)
2005–2007	Northampton Town	73	(3)
2007–2009	Shrewsbury Town	29	(2)
2009–2011	Brentford	46	(5)
2011	→ Crawley Town (loan)	25	(1)
2011–2013	Crawley Town	50	(0)
2013–2015	Oxford United	49	(0)
2014–2015	→ Barnet (loan)	10	(0)
2015	Maidenhead United	12	(0)
2015–2016	Margate	36	(1)
2016–2018	Wealdstone	17	(0)
Total		414	(13)
- * Club domestic league appearances and goals

David John Hunt (born 10 September 1982) is an English former football midfielder.

== Playing career ==
Born in London, Hunt began as a trainee with Crystal Palace, but made only a few appearances after turning professional. He moved to Leyton Orient in 2003, playing 74 times in all competitions in two seasons. He then moved to Northampton Town, where he was a key player in the club's successful promotion season of 2005–06, with his long throw-in being a prominent weapon in the team's tactical arsenal that year.

Hunt signed for Shrewsbury Town on 15 May 2007, on a two-year deal after rejecting an offer of a contract extension at Northampton. In January 2009, he came to an agreement with Paul Simpson, the Shrewsbury Town boss, on the remainder of his contract and consequently left the club as he attempted to move back down south as his family failed to settle in the area. His spell at the club was littered by injuries, resulting in few appearances over the one and a half seasons he was at the club.

Hunt signed for Brentford on 9 January 2009, on a contract until the end of the season. He scored two crucial goals for the Bees in their promotion campaign including a well-struck free kick against Gillingham. He signed a new two-year contract in June 2009.

He signed for Crawley Town on 31 December 2010, initially on a one-month loan, with a view to a permanent move being completed at the end of January 2011. He made his debut for the club the next day as a 63rd-minute substitute against Eastbourne Borough. Hunt assisted Crawley to the Conference title in 2010–11. At the end of the season, after a successful loan, Hunt signed for Crawley permanently on a two-year deal.

In June 2013, after leaving Crawley by mutual consent, he signed for Oxford United. On 31 October 2014 he was loaned to Barnet until January 2015.

On 2 February 2015, Hunt left Oxford United by mutual consent.

After turning down an opportunity from Dean Saunders to return to the professional game with Crawley Town, Hunt co-founded the Bean Team: a new distribution network for a premium healthy brand of Organo coffee. He also briefly signed for National League South side Maidenhead United, before joining Margate in June 2015.

On 1 June 2016, Hunt signed for National League South rivals Wealdstone. After one season at Grosvenor Vale, the midfielder penned another one-season deal with The Stones in June 2017.

== Career statistics ==
Appearances and goals by club, season and competition
Club	Season	League			FA Cup		League Cup		Other		Total	
Club	Season	Division	Apps	Goals	Apps	Goals	Apps	Goals	Apps	Goals	Apps	Goals
Crystal Palace	2002–03	First Division	2	0	0	0	1	0	―		3	0
Leyton Orient	2003–04	Third Division	38	1	2	0	1	0	1 (Note: Appearances in Football League Trophy)	0	42	1
Leyton Orient	2004–05	League Two	27	0	1	1	1	0	3	0	32	1
Leyton Orient	Total		65	1	3	1	2	0	4	0	74	2
Northampton Town	2004–05	League Two	4	0	―		―		1 (Note: Appearance in League Two play-offs)	0	5	0
Northampton Town	2005–06	League Two	40	3	4	0	1	0	1	0	46	3
Northampton Town	2006–07	League One	29	0	3	0	0	0	1	0	33	0
Northampton Town	Total		73	3	7	0	1	0	3	0	84	3
Shrewsbury Town	2007–08	League Two	27	2	0	0	2	0	0	0	29	2
Shrewsbury Town	2008–09	League Two	2	0	1	0	0	0	1	0	4	0
Shrewsbury Town	Total		29	2	1	0	2	0	1	0	33	2
Brentford	2008–09	League Two	20	2	―		―		―		20	2
Brentford	2009–10	League One	24	3	4	0	1	0	1	0	30	3
Brentford	2010–11	League One	3	0	0	0	1	0	1	0	5	0
Brentford	Total		47	5	4	0	2	0	2	0	55	
Crawley Town (loan)	2010–11	Conference Premier	25	1	3	0	―		―		28	1
Crawley Town	2011–12	League Two	27	0	5	0	2	0	1	0	35	0
Crawley Town	2012–13	League One	23	0	2	0	1	0	2	0	28	0
Crawley Town	Total		75	1	10	0	3	0	3	0	91	1
Oxford United	2013–14	League Two	46	0	5	0	1	0	1	0	53	0
Oxford United	2014–15	League Two	3	0	―		2	0	0	0	5	0
Oxford United	Total		49	0	5	0	3	0	1	0	58	0
Barnet (loan)	2014–15	Conference Premier	10	0	1	0	―		2 (Note: Appearances in FA Trophy)	0	13	0
Maidenhead United	2014–15	Conference Premier	12	0	―		―		―		12	0
Margate	2015–16	National League South	36	1	1	0	―		0	0	37	1
Wealdstone	2016–17	National League South	15	0	1	0	―		1	0	17	0
Wealdstone	2017–18	National League South	2	0	0	0	―		0	0	2	0
Wealdstone	Total		17	0	1	0	―		1	0	19	0
Career total			415	13	33	1	14	0	17	0	479	14

== Honours ==
Northampton Town

- Football League Two second-place promotion: 2005–06

Brentford

- Football League Two: 2008–09

Crawley Town

- Football Conference: 2010–11
- Football League Two third-place promotion: 2011–12
