= New Meadow =

Football stadium

Coordinates: 52.6886°N 2.7493°W

- The Croud Meadow • Oteley Road • The Meadow
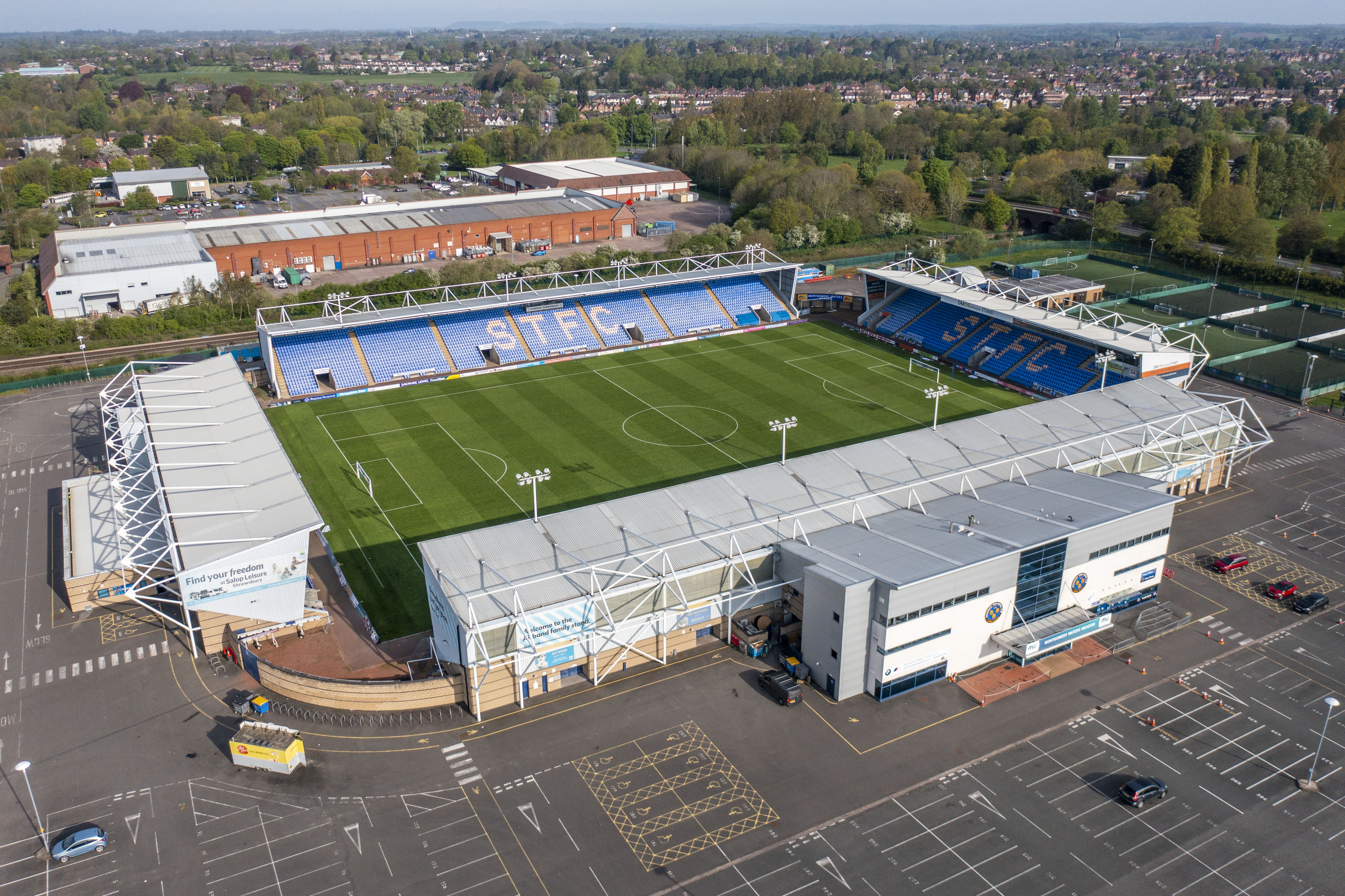
- UEFA
- Interactive map of New Meadow
- Full name: The Croud Meadow
- Location: Oteley Road; Shrewsbury; Shropshire; SY2 6ST
- Owner: Shrewsbury Town F.C.
- Capacity: 9,875 (555 safe standing)
- Surface: Grass
- Record attendance: 10,210
- Public transit: Shrewsbury (2.3 mi)

Construction
- Built: 2006–2007
- Opened: July 2007

Tenants
- Shrewsbury Town F.C. (2007–present); The New Saints (2024) European Competitions

New Meadow, also known as The Croud Meadow for sponsorship purposes, is a stadium situated on the southern outskirts of Shrewsbury, Shropshire, between the districts of Meole Brace and Sutton Farm, and close to the A5. It serves the home ground of English football club Shrewsbury Town.

It was completed in the summer of 2007, in time for the 2007–08 English football season, and was built to replace Gay Meadow, Shrewsbury Town's home stadium since 1910.

== Stadium ==
=== Naming ===
The stadium had no official name during the club's first season at their new home, before being christened the "Prostar Stadium" in a four-year deal with the sports kit manufacturer of the same name in July 2008. The club had initially distanced themselves from the unofficial name of "New Meadow", preferring to sever links with the old Gay Meadow ground, however when the naming deal with Prostar ended two years earlier than scheduled, new sponsors Greenhous gave supporters the opportunity to vote for a new stadium name, with "Meadow" added to the shortlist after feedback from fans. From May 2010, the stadium was officially known as "Greenhous Meadow", until Greenhous announced they would be ending their sponsorship of the club and stadium in November 2016, with local firm Montgomery Waters taking on the naming rights from July 2017. On 13 June 2023, it was announced that Shrewsbury based digital marketing company Croud would be taking over sponsorship of the stadium from the previous sponsors Montgomery Waters. The stadium is now known officially as “The Croud Meadow.”

=== Design and construction ===
Proposals to move to a new stadium site at Oteley Road were first drawn up in the late 1990s, with planning permission granted in September 2003. A covenant protecting the Gay Meadow site for sports use was transferred to Oteley Road in 2004, clearing the way for the sale of the old ground to property developers to finance the building of New Meadow.

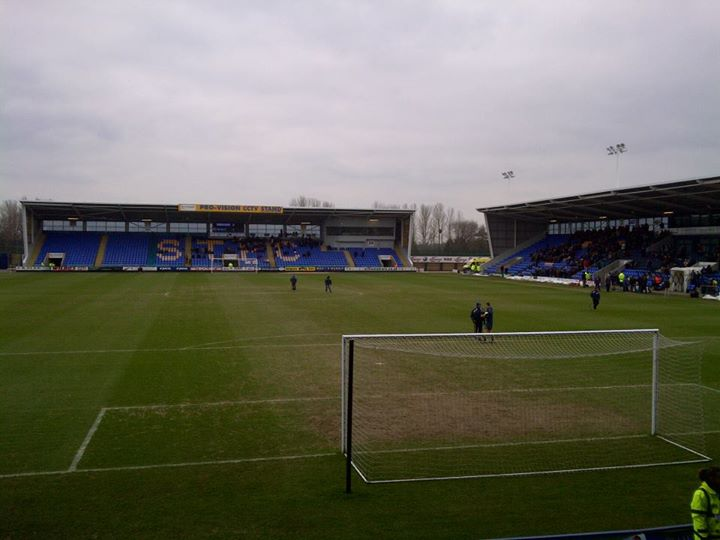
North Stand.

The stadium was designed by WDW Partnership architects, with the project awarded to Hall Construction, at a cost of £11.2 million, with a brief to build a 10,000 capacity all-seater stadium, with banqueting facilities for up to 300 people. The project consisted of erecting four stands, including hospitality boxes, function rooms, kitchen, bars, offices and a club shop as well as adjoining community and training pitches, a 670 space car park and access roads. Work was completed for the new stadium to open in time for the beginning of the 2007–08 Football League Two season.

=== Stands ===
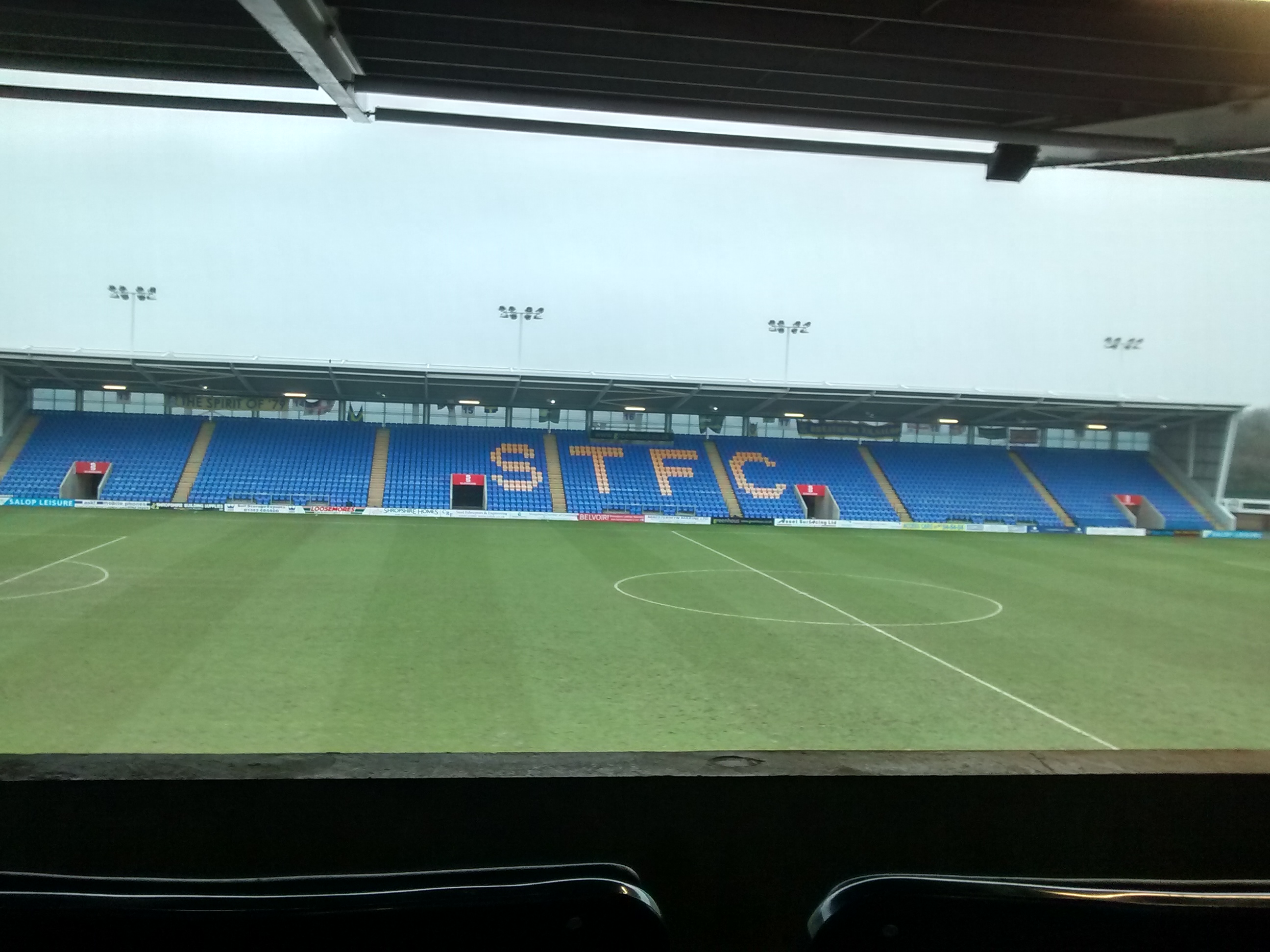
West Stand

The East and West stands run the length of the pitch; the South and North stands face onto the ends of the pitch. All stands are fully seated and covered; each stand also has its own catering and toilets. At present the stands are detached from one another.

- "Roland Wycherley Stand" - East stand, named after the former chairman; includes the club's hospitality facilities, the changing rooms, club offices and club shop. Blocks 1−7. Capacity 2,741.
- "Salop Leisure Stand" - South stand, named after a local caravan dealer. Houses the new safe-standing section of the ground. Blocks 8−12. Capacity 1,955.
- "DMOS People Stand" - North stand, named after a local recruitment agency - the away supporters' stand; also has stadium control room and scoreboard, resulting in fewer seats than the South stand. Blocks 20−24. Capacity 1,796.
- "The Rybrook Shrewsbury Stand" - West stand, named after a local BMW dealership. Blocks 13−19. Capacity 3,317.

=== Expansion and developments ===
In December 2019 the ground capacity increased slightly by just two seats. These seats were luxury seats added to the Roland Wycherley Stand known as the best seats in the house. After the first nine seasons hosted at New Meadow, the average attendance for first-team league matches stood at 5,612, approximately 57% of capacity (see table below), with no confirmed prospect of stadium expansion in the foreseeable future as of July 2016.

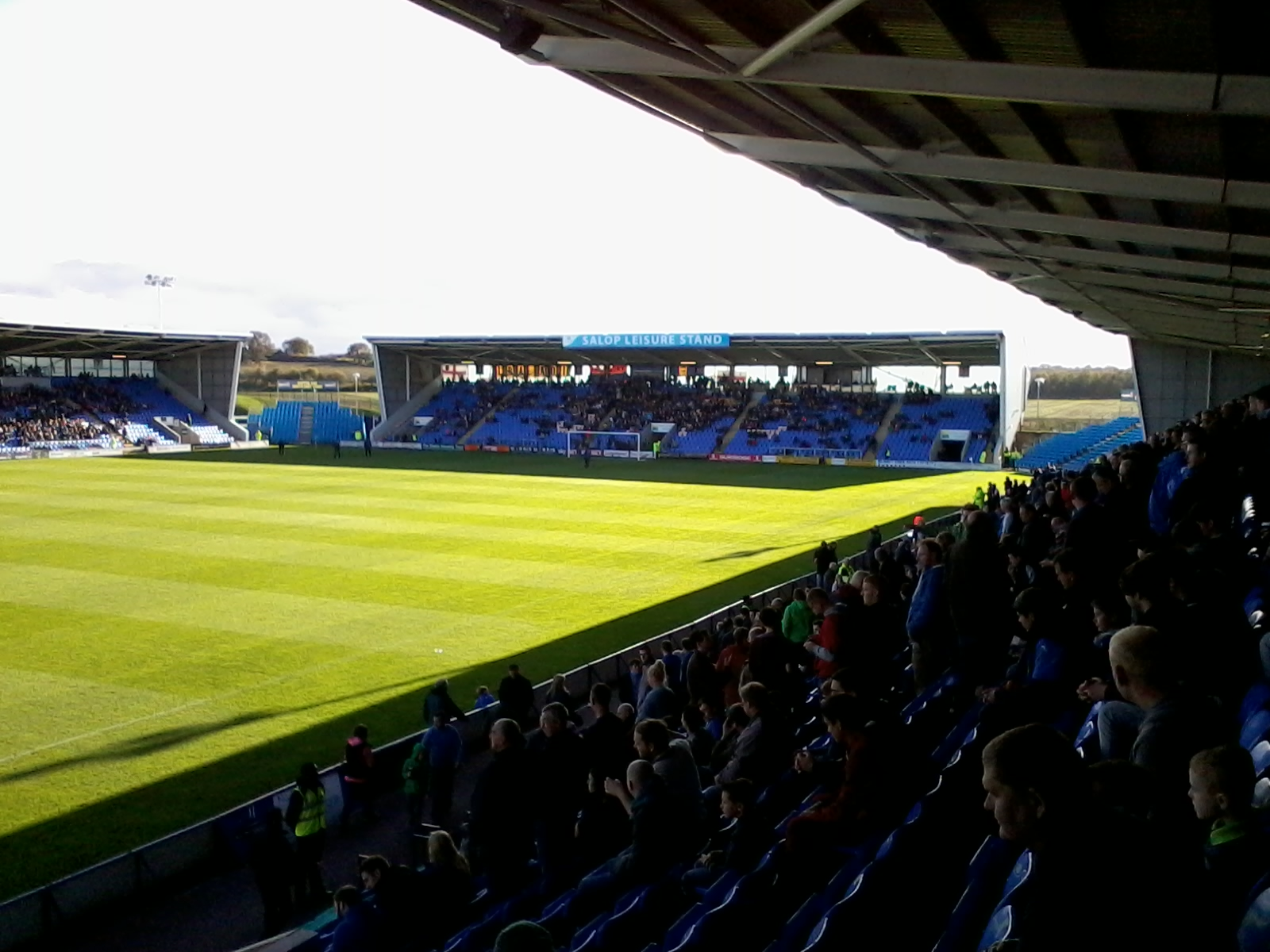
New Meadow with temporary seating, October 2014

In September 2014, Shrewsbury drew Chelsea at home in the fourth round of the League Cup. With the club anticipating a high demand for tickets, C.E.O. Matt Williams proposed that temporary seating could be erected in the corners between the existing stands. In order to maintain segregation between home and away supporters, and to allow access for emergency vehicles, the proposals were later reduced to two temporary stands at the South (home) end of the ground, With match tickets selling out on their first day of general sale, the club confirmed the plans on 13 October 2014, which temporarily raised the capacity of New Meadow to 10,361.

Subsequent developments on the stadium site include 5G 5-a-side and 7-a-side pitches currently operated by Powerleague, and a community centre run by "Shrewsbury Town in the Community" which opened on land behind the South stand in 2016. A memorial garden area to remember fans, staff and players who have died was also relocated near the entrance to the stadium in the same year. Shropshire Football Association are also based at New Meadow, with their county office located in a building at the rear of the South stand.

The food retailer Lidl submitted plans to build a supermarket at the stadium site in May 2016, however this was partly reliant on the local council agreeing to move land earmarked for community use at the North end of the ground to another part of the site. Planning permission for the Lidl development and a new community pitch was approved in April 2017, with building work due to begin the following month.

==== Safe standing ====
In June 2017, Shrewsbury Town applied to the Sports Grounds Safety Authority to convert an existing section of the all-seater New Meadow stadium to a safe standing area, making them the first club in the English Football League to do so. Permission was granted the following month, with £75,000 to be raised via a crowdfunding initiative to install rail seating to the back of the South Stand, with a planned capacity of 550.

=== Transport systems ===
With the ground not being centrally located and with only limited car parking on-site, the club operates a matchday travel plan, to encourage spectators to walk, cycle or use organised transport where possible. Shrewsbury railway station is just over two miles from the stadium. The Meole Brace Park and Ride bus service is nearby to the stadium, just over a mile away.

== Notable fixtures ==
The first match at the new ground was an All Stars' friendly game as part of Shrewsbury Town's new sponsorship deal with Italian sportswear manufacturer A-Line, who made Shrewsbury's kit for the 2007–08 season. Heading the list of All-Stars players was Gianfranco Zola, with the team being managed by Ron Atkinson. The match took place on Saturday 14 July 2007, and Shrewsbury Town ran out 4−0 winners, Shrewsbury striker Dave Hibbert taking the honour of being the first ever goalscorer at the new ground.

The first competitive match at New Meadow was a League Cup match against Colchester United, of the Championship, then two divisions above Shrewsbury. It took place on Tuesday 14 August 2007, Shrewsbury winning 1−0 thanks to a header from Darran Kempson in extra time. The first league fixture, in League Two, was against Bradford City on Saturday 18 August, with Shrewsbury winning 1−0 from a first half penalty scored by Dave Hibbert.

In November 2007 the England women's national football team played Spain at New Meadow. England won 1–0 with a Karen Carney goal.

On 18 October 2010 it was announced that New Meadow had been selected as part of England's bid to host the UEFA European Under-21 Football Championship in 2013. On 28 January 2011, however, it was ruled Israel will host the Under 21s Finals.

On 27 March 2012, the generator room in the East Stand caught fire which caused the League Two match against Port Vale to be abandoned in the second half with the score 1–0 to Shrewsbury Town. Shrewsbury then won the replayed match 1–0.

Shrewsbury Town went 34 matches unbeaten in all competitions at New Meadow over an 18-month period between 2011 and 2012, under manager Graham Turner. The run was ended by a 1−0 defeat to Scunthorpe United in September 2012.

On 23 September 2024, it was announced that The New Saints F.C. would play their UEFA Conference League home matches at New Meadow. Their home ground Park Hall meets UEFA regulations for qualifying matches but not for matches in the League Phase. They hosted Astana on 26 October, Djurgården on 28 November and Panathinaikos on 12 December.

== Record attendances ==
First team competitive matches featuring Shrewsbury Town only. As of 26 January 2020.

| Position | Away team | Date | Competition | Total attendance | Home | Away | Notes | Ref |
|---|---|---|---|---|---|---|---|---|
| 1 | v Chelsea | 28 October 2014 | League Cup Round Four | 10,210 | 8,490 | 1,720 | First game at New Meadow with additional temporary seating | |
| 2 | v West Ham United | 7 January 2018 | FA Cup Round Three | 9,535 | 7,994 | 1,541 | | |
| 3 (tie) | v Wolverhampton Wanderers | 21 September 2013 | League One | 9,510 | 7,917 | 1,593 | | |
| 3 (tie) | v Liverpool | 26 January 2020 | FA Cup Round Four | 9,510 | 7,826 | 1,684 | | |
| 5 | v Wolverhampton Wanderers | 26 January 2019 | FA Cup | 9,503 | | | | |
| 6 | v Dagenham and Redbridge | 28 April 2012 | League Two | 9,441 | 9,294 | 147 | Home supporters also allocated seats in away section | |
| 7 | v Manchester United | 22 February 2016 | FA Cup Round Five | 9,370 | 7,807 | 1,563 | | |
| 8 | v Wrexham | 7 January 2024 | FA Cup Round three | 9,304 | 7,645 | 1,659 | | |
| 9 | v Walsall | 4 May 2019 | League One | 9,135 | 7,486 | 1,649 | | |
| 10 | v Sunderland | 20 October 2018 | League One | 9,007 | 7,367 | 1,640 | | |
| 11 | v Plymouth Argyle | 2 May 2015 | League Two | 8,963 | 7,869 | 1,094 | | |
| 12 | v Oxford United | 7 May 2011 | League Two | 8,817 | | | | |

== Average attendances ==
| Season | Division | Attendance | |
| Season | Division | Average | Highest |
|---|---|---|---|
| 2007−08 | League Two | 5,659 | 7,707 (vs. Stockport County) |
| 2008−09 | League Two | 5,657 | 7,162 (vs. Port Vale) |
| 2009−10 | League Two | 5,482 | 7,096 (vs. Port Vale) |
| 2010−11 | League Two | 5,876 | 8,817 (vs. Oxford United) |
| 2011−12 | League Two | 5,770 | 9,441 (vs. Dagenham & Redbridge) |
| 2012−13 | League One | 5,736 | 8,021 (vs. Portsmouth) |
| 2013−14 | League One | 5,581 | 9,510 (vs. Wolverhampton Wanderers) |
| 2014−15 | League Two | 5,343 | 8,963 (vs. Plymouth Argyle) |
| 2015−16 | League One | 5,407 | 7,019 (vs. Port Vale) |
| 2016−17 | League One | 5,507 | 7,532 (vs. Bolton Wanderers) |
| 2017–18 | League One | 6,249 | 8,202 (vs. Blackburn Rovers) |
| 2018–19 | League One | 6,407 | 9,135 (vs. Walsall) |
| 2019–20 | League One | 6,280 | 8,117 (vs. Sunderland) |
| 2020–21 | League One | NA | 2,000 (vs. Accrington Stanley) |
| 2021–22 | League One | 6,216 | 8,369 (vs. Wigan Athletic) |
| 2022–23 | League One | 6,430 | 8,457 (vs. Sheffield Wednesday) |
| 2023–24 | League One | 6,361 | 8,088 (vs. Derby County) |
| 2024–25 | League One | 6,211 | 8,789 (vs. Wrexham) |
| 2024–25 | League Two | 5,659 | 7,879 (vs. Walsall) |
