= 2009–10 Shrewsbury Town F.C. season =

Shrewsbury Town
2009–10 season
- Chairman: Roland Wycherley
- Manager: Paul Simpson
- League Two: 12th
- FA Cup: First round
- League Cup: First round
- Football League Trophy: Second round
- Top goalscorer: League: Dave Hibbert (13); All: Dave Hibbert (14)
- Highest home attendance: 7,096 vs. Port Vale, 10 October 2009
- Lowest home attendance: 4,184 vs. Ipswich Town, 11 August 2009
- Average home league attendance: 5,481
Home colours	Away colours

The 2009–10 season was Shrewsbury Town's 6th consecutive season in League Two.

== Pre-season friendlies ==
Date	Kick Off (Local)	Opponent	H / A	Result F–A	Scorers	Attendance	Ref.
15 July 2009	19:45	Northwich Victoria	A	1–0	Robinson 80'	390	
22 July 2009	19:45	West Bromwich Albion	H	0–2		2,437	
25 July 2009	15:00	Leicester City	H	0–4		2,030	
1 August 2009	15:00	Tranmere Rovers	A	1–1	Langmead 19'		

== Shropshire Senior Cup Final ==
Date	Kick Off (Local)	Opponent	H / A	Result F–A	Scorers	Attendance	Ref.
18 July 2009	15:00	Telford United	H	1–1 (1–4 p)	Langmead 77'	2,413	

== League Two ==
=== League table ===
Pos	Team	Pld	W	D	L	GF	GA	GD	Pts
10	Port Vale	46	17	17	12	61	50	+11	68
11	Northampton Town	46	18	13	15	62	53	+9	67
12	Shrewsbury Town	46	17	12	17	55	54	+1	63
13	Burton Albion	46	17	11	18	71	71	0	62
14	Bradford City	46	16	14	16	59	62	−3	62

Updated to match(es) played on unknown. Source: football-league.co.uk

=== Matches ===
Date	Kick Off (Local)	Opponent	H / A	Result F–A	Scorers	Attendance	Ref.
8 August 2009	15:00	Burton Albion	H	3–1	Robinson 10', Hibbert 49', Labadie 82'	6,438	
15 August 2009	15:00	Barnet	A	2–2	Elder 2', Hibbert 57'	1,835	
18 August 2009	19:45	Dagenham & Redbridge	A	0–5		1,683	
22 August 2009	15:00	Chesterfield	H	1–1	Leslie 31'	5,086	
29 August 2009	15:00	Accrington Stanley	A	3–1	Leslie 17' (pen.), Langmead 50', Hibbert 82'	1,447	
5 September 2009	15:00	Bradford City	H	1–2	Hibbert 67'	5,525	
12 September 2009	15:00	Crewe Alexandra	H	2–0	Hibbert 28', Labadie 69'	6,204	
19 September 2009	15:00	Lincoln City	A	2–0	Robinson 27', Hibbert 75'	3,234	
26 September 2009	15:00	Northampton Town	H	3–0	Robinson 22', Labadie 49', Langmead 54'	5,548	
29 September 2009	19:45	Cheltenham Town	A	2–1	Hibbert 72', Labadie 74'	2,928	
3 October 2009	15:00	Morecambe	A	1–1	Labadie 7'	2,105	
10 October 2009	15:00	Port Vale	H	0–1		7,096	
17 October 2009	15:00	Darlington	A	1–2	Neal 4'	1,958	
24 October 2009	15:00	Aldershot Town	H	3–1	Fairhurst 32', Neal 45', Elder 60'	5,417	
31 October 2009	15:00	Notts County	A	1–1	Devitt 30'	7,562	
14 November 2009	15:00	Torquay United	H	1–1	Hibbert 81'	5,072	
21 November 2009	15:00	Bury	H	1–1	Coughlan 90'	5,070	
24 November 2009	19:45	Hereford United	A	1–2	Fairhurst 45'	2,913	
1 December 2009	19:45	Rotherham United	H	2–0	Fairhurst 43', Devitt 88'	4,522	
5 December 2009	15:00	Bournemouth	A	0–1		4,652	
12 December 2009	15:00	Grimsby Town	H	0–0		4,850	
19 December 2009	15:00	Rochdale	A	0–4		2,596	
26 December 2009	15:00	Macclesfield Town	H	2–2	Fairhurst 45', Hibbert 90'	5,942	
28 December 2009	15:00	Bradford City	A	3–1	Dunfield 11', McIntyre 45' (pen.), Hibbert 79'	11,522	
2 January 2010	15:00	Chesterfield	A	1–0	Hibbert 38'	3,601	
16 January 2010	15:00	Burton	A	1–1	Hibbert 27'	3,139	
23 January 2010	15:00	Dagenham & Redbridge	H	2–1	Hibbert 13', Leslie 45'	4,812	
30 January 2010	15:00	Accrington Stanley	H	0–1		5,319	
6 February 2010	15:00	Macclesfield Town	A	1–0	Leslie 54'	2,058	
9 February 2010	19:45	Barnet	H	2–0	Disley 12', Leslie 28'	4,328	
13 February 2010	15:00	Hereford United	H	3–1	Langmead 15', Cansdell-Sherriff 24', Coughlan 79'	6,098	
19 February 2010	19:45	Bury	A	0–1		3,720	
22 February 2010	19:45	Rotherham United	A	1–1	Leslie 45'	2,869	
27 February 2010	15:00	Bournemouth	H	1–0	Dunfield 49'	6,061	
6 March 2010	15:00	Grimsby Town	A	0–3		3,651	
13 March 2010	15:00	Rochdale	H	0–1		6,081	
20 March 2010	15:00	Aldershot Town	A	0–2		2,681	
27 March 2010	15:00	Darlington	H	0–2		5,081	
3 April 2010	15:00	Torquay United	A	1–2	Bevan 29' o.g.	3,094	
5 April 2010	15:00	Notts County	H	0–1		6,287	
10 April 2010	15:00	Crewe Alexandra	A	3–0	Hibbert 30', Bradshaw 86', 90+1'	4,283	
13 April 2010	19:45	Cheltenham Town	H	0–0		4,967	
17 April 2010	15:00	Lincoln City	H	1–0	Bright 83'	4,932	
24 April 2010	15:00	Northampton Town	A	0–2		5,019	
1 May 2010	15:00	Morecambe	H	2–3	van den Broek 33', Bradshaw 48'	5,340	
8 May 2010	15:00	Port Vale	A	1–1	Bright 11'	8,467	

== FA Cup ==
Shrewsbury Town entered the 2009–10 FA Cup at the First Round.

Round	Date	Kick Off (Local)	Opponent	H / A	Result F–A	Scorers	Attendance	Ref.
First round	7 November 2009	15:00	Staines Town	H	0–1		3,539	

== League Cup ==
The draw for the First Round of the 2009–10 League Cup took place on 16 June 2009. Shrewsbury Town was paired with Ipswich Town, the tie took place at New Meadow on 11 August 2009.

Round	Date	Kick Off (Local)	Opponent	H / A	Result F–A	Scorers	Attendance	Ref.
First round	11 August 2009	19:45	Ipswich Town	H	3–3 (2–4 p)	Robinson 16', Hibbert 25', Cansdell-Sherriff 74'	4,184	

== Johnstone's Paint Trophy ==
A bye in the First Round of the 2009–10 Johnston's Paint Trophy was given to Shrewsbury Town. In the Second Round, the club was paired with Accrington Stanley. The game was originally scheduled to be played in the week commencing 5 October 2009, however a waterlogged pitch at the Crown Ground meant the game was postponed until 20 October 2009.

Round	Date	Kick Off (Local)	Opponent	H / A	Result F–A	Scorers	Attendance	Ref.
Second round	20 October 2009	19:00	Accrington Stanley	A	0–2		819	
