= Luke Jones (footballer) =

English footballer

Personal information
- Full name: Luke Joseph Jones
- Date of birth: 10 April 1987 (age 39)
- Place of birth: Darwen, England
- Height: 6 ft 1 in (1.85 m)
- Position: Defender

Youth career
- Blackburn Rovers

Senior career*
Years	Team	Apps	(Gls)
2005–2006	Blackburn Rovers	0	(0)
2005–2006	→ Cercle Brugge (loan)	8	(0)
2006	Ashton United	1	(0)
2006–2008	Shrewsbury Town	14	(0)
2008	→ Kidderminster Harriers (loan)	6	(0)
2008–2009	Kidderminster Harriers	30	(1)
2009–2010	Mansfield Town	25	(2)
2010–2011	Forest Green Rovers	45	(2)
2011–2012	Kidderminster Harriers	39	(4)
2012–2013	Mansfield Town	32	(8)
2013–2014	Stevenage	26	(0)
2014–2015	Mansfield Town	0	(0)
2016–2018	Tamworth	64	(1)
2018–2020	Stafford Rangers	45	(4)
- * Club domestic league appearances and goals as of 16:00, 2 March 2021 (UTC)

Luke Joseph Jones (born 10 April 1987) is an English professional footballer, who most recently played for Northern Premier League Premier Division side Stafford Rangers, where he played as a central defender.

Jones started his career at Blackburn Rovers, playing regularly at youth and reserve level without making any first-team appearances. During his time with the Lancashire club, Jones was loaned out to Cercle Brugge of the Belgian First Division. He was released by Blackburn in the summer of 2006 and, after a brief spell at Ashton United, joined League Two side Shrewsbury Town in November 2006. He featured sporadically for Shrewsbury and spent time out on loan at Conference National club Kidderminster Harriers in February 2008. Jones signed for Kidderminster on a permanent basis ahead of the 2008–09 season and played regularly. After a year at Kidderminster, he spent one season at Mansfield Town, before becoming Forest Green Rovers' club captain for the 2010–11 campaign. He returned to Kidderminster the following season, and then re-joined another of his former clubs, Mansfield Town, in June 2012. His second spell at Mansfield was a successful one, with the club winning the Conference National title. At the end of the season, in May 2013, Jones signed for League One side Stevenage on a free transfer before returning to Mansfield for a third time.

== Playing career ==
=== Blackburn Rovers ===
Jones began his career as a trainee at Premier League side Blackburn Rovers, where he progressed through the various youth ranks and helped the youth team reach the semi-final of the FA Youth Cup in 2004. He captained the U18 side on their way to winning the Premier Academy League in 2005, and was also a regular for the reserve team throughout the 2004–05 season.

=== Cercle Brugge (loan) ===
The following season, Jones spent the campaign on loan at Cercle Brugge of the Belgian First Division in order to gain first-team experience, and made eight appearances during his year-long stay with the club. On returning to his parent club in the summer of 2006, Jones was released, and did not make a first-team appearance during his time at Blackburn.

=== Ashton United ===
Following his release from Blackburn, Jones joined Northern Premier League side Ashton United on a short-term basis in September 2006, and made one league appearance for the club during his brief stay.

=== Shrewsbury Town ===
After a trial period with League Two team Shrewsbury Town a month later, he joined the club on a permanent deal in November 2006, for the remainder of the 2006–07 season. Jones made his debut for Shrewsbury in a 2–0 away defeat to Hereford United in the FA Cup on 21 November, coming on as a second-half substitute in the match. He went on to make five appearances during his first two months with the club, and also impressed for the reserve side. As a result, his contract was extended in February 2007, by another year until the summer of 2008. Jones made twelve appearances during his first season with the club, including in both legs of the League Two play-off semi-final against MK Dons. He was named on the team-sheet for the play-off final at Wembley in May 2007, but was unable to play after injuring his knee during the warm-up before the game. The knee injury required surgery, and it was four months later before he was able to return to full training.

Jones returned to first-team action three months into the 2007–08 season, but, with strong defensive competition, struggled to hold down a regular place in the team.

=== Kidderminster Harriers (loan) ===
Jones subsequently joined Conference National side Kidderminster Harriers on a one-month loan deal in February 2008, and made his debut shortly after, playing the whole match in a 0–0 draw with Northwich Victoria at Aggborough. The loan agreement was extended for a further month on 3 March, after Jones had made five appearances for Kidderminster. However, after making two further appearances, during which Kidderminster kept two clean sheets, new Shrewsbury manager Paul Simpson chose to recall Jones prematurely and he returned to his parent club on 12 March. The decision to recall Jones just hours before Kidderminster's match with Stevenage angered Kidderminster manager Mark Yates, who stated – "I was put in a position that I shouldn't have been in at five o'clock on the night of a game. But we try and do things properly and for Luke's sake I left him out". On returning to Shrewsbury, Jones made three further appearances that season, but was ultimately released by the club at the end of the season. During his time at the club, he played 19 times in all competitions.

=== Kidderminster Harriers ===
After his successful loan spell earlier in the season, Jones joined Kidderminster on a permanent basis in May 2008, signing a one-year contract. He started in the club's first game of the 2008–09 season, a 1–1 home draw with newly promoted Lewes, and scored his first professional goal later that month, on 25 August, heading in a corner with just ten minutes remaining as Kidderminster twice came from behind to draw 2–2 with Burton Albion. He received the first red card of his career in October 2008, described as a "stupid" dismissal in Kidderminster's 5–1 away victory against King's Lynn in the FA Cup. Jones added another goal to his tally that season when he scored in the club's 3–2 win over Burscough in the FA Trophy on 16 December 2008. He was a regular fixture in the side's defence during the first half of the season as Kidderminster were fighting for one of the four play-off positions. However, after Kidderminster lost 3–1 to Cambridge United on 17 February 2009, a game in which Jones gave away a penalty after fouling Scott Rendell in the area, he did not feature again for two months. He returned to first-team action on 1 April, as Kidderminster comfortably secured a 5–1 away win against Woking, and went on to make four further appearances during the remainder of the season. Jones made 33 appearances and scored twice during a season that witnessed Kidderminster narrowly miss out on the play-off places, finishing in sixth, two points behind the final play-off position. He was one of seven players that were released by the club on 12 May 2009, with manager Mark Yates citing that finances played a key role in which players were asked to re-sign.

=== Mansfield Town ===
Shortly after leaving Kidderminster, Jones signed for fellow Conference National side Mansfield Town on a one-year deal. Mansfield manager David Holdsworth stated – "Luke is a centre-half who can also play at right-back. He is strong and commanding and someone who I think the fans will like". He made his debut for the club on the opening day of the 2009–10 campaign, playing the whole 90 minutes as Mansfield beat Crawley Town 4–0 at Field Mill. Jones played regularly during the first six months of the season, and scored twice, both goals coming in the club's 4–1 away victory at Forest Green Rovers on 30 January 2010. However, he was sent-off in Mansfield's 3–1 away defeat to eventual champions Stevenage on 9 February, and would go on to make just two further appearances during the remaining three months of the season due to both suspension and injury. Jones made 27 appearances that season in all competitions and scored two goals. He left Mansfield when his contract expired in May 2010.

=== Forest Green Rovers ===
A month later, on 17 June 2010, Jones signed for another Conference National side in the form of Forest Green Rovers, joining on a one-year contract. He was made first-team captain at The New Lawn ahead of the 2010–11 season, and went on to make his debut against his former club, Mansfield Town, playing the whole game in a 3–1 away loss on 14 August 2010. Three days later, Jones opened his goalscoring account for the season when he headed in Lee Fowler's floated corner in the club's 3–0 home victory over Wrexham. He scored one further time during the season, in Forest Green's final game of 2010, giving his side the lead with another headed goal in a 4–2 win against Bath City. Jones finished the season having played every minute in all but one league game, and made 46 appearances during his one year at the club. He was named as Forest Green's Player of the Year for the 2010–11 season at the end of season awards.

=== Return to Kidderminster ===
Jones was asked by Forest Green to resign because of his impressive season but he returned to Kidderminster Harriers on 18 May 2011. He signed a one-year deal with the club. Jones started in the club's first match of the 2011–12 season, a 3–2 home defeat to Gateshead. He scored twice within the space of two weeks at the end of August and start of September, both of which headed goals; the first in a 3–1 win at Newport County, before briefly giving Kidderminster the lead in an eventual 2–2 home draw with Ebbsfleet United. Jones went on to score two further times during the season, both goals coming in the club's seven-match unbeaten run towards the end of the season. His goal in Kidderminster's 2–1 win over Southport at Haig Avenue on 7 April came in the 91st minute of the match, continuing the club's trend of scoring late goals. A week later, on 14 April, he headed in the club's fifth goal in a 6–1 home win against Kettering Town. He was a mainstay in central defence during the campaign, and scored four goals in 39 appearances as Kidderminster missed out on the play-off places after once again finishing in sixth place. He left Kidderminster at the end of the season when his contract expired.

=== Second spell at Mansfield ===
In June 2012, Jones re-joined another of his former clubs for a second time when he returned to Mansfield Town on a free transfer. On signing Jones, Mansfield Town manager Paul Cox said – "We watched Luke a number of times last season. He is a good all-round solid defender, who is strong in the air and in the tackle. He is a no-nonsense character who will add grit to our backline". Jones stated he made the move due to Mansfield's "realistic chance of promotion to the Football League". He started the season playing regularly, and scored two goals in eight appearances from defence in the opening two months of the season. Following Mansfield's 3–1 away loss to Ebbsfleet United on 8 September, Jones featured just once in the next three months – scoring in the match, a convincing 3–0 victory at Macclesfield Town in November 2012. Jones returned to the first-team in January 2013, starting in a 3–1 away win against Stockport County.

He remained a regular fixture in the club's defence for the remainder of the season, with Mansfield pushing for promotion back to the Football League. He scored his fourth goal of the season when he headed in Colin Daniel's cross to add to Mansfield's lead in a 5–0 win over Dartford at Field Mill. Two weeks later, on 16 February, he scored once again, poking in from close range to restore Mansfield's lead in a victory over Cambridge United. Jones' sixth of the season came when he headed in James Jennings' centre to give the club an important 2–1 away win against Woking on 6 March 2013. He scored the only goal of the game on the hour mark in Mansfield's 1–0 away win at Tamworth on 30 March, subsequently earning Mansfield a club record eleventh consecutive victory, as the run propelled them to the top of the Conference National table. He added one final goal to his tally in what was a goalscoring season for the defender, his eighth of the campaign coming in a 3–1 home win against Macclesfield Town, a win that moved Mansfield two points clear at the top with just three games remaining. Mansfield secured the title courtesy of a 1–0 win against Wrexham on the last day of the season, with Jones scoring eight times in 32 matches during the season.

=== Stevenage ===
Jones rejected re-signing with Mansfield following his "highly-impressive season", and instead signed for League One side Stevenage on 21 May 2013. Jones made his Stevenage debut on the opening day of the 2013–14 season, playing the first 68 minutes as the club lost 4–3 at home to Oldham Athletic.

=== Third spell at Mansfield Town ===
Jones returned to Mansfield for a third time in May 2014. However, he suffered a long-term Achilles injury in October 2014. He was released in the summer of 2015.

=== Tamworth ===
Following a spell away from the game Jones returned to football signing for Conference North side Tamworth on 23, September, 2016. Jones had been with the club for a few weeks prior on trial, and following the player proving his fitness and completing 90 minutes in an under 21 match the previous Saturday, the club gave the player a deal.

== Honours ==
Mansfield Town

- Conference National (1): 2012–13

Individual

- Forest Green Rovers Player of the Year (1): 2010–11

== Career statistics ==
As of match played 2 March 2021

Appearances and goals by club, season and competition
Club	Season	League			National Cup		League Cup		Other		Total	
Club	Season	Division	Apps	Goals	Apps	Goals	Apps	Goals	Apps	Goals	Apps	Goals
Blackburn Rovers	2005–06	Premier League	0	0	0	0	0	0	—		0	0
Cercle Brugge	2005–06	Belgian First Division	8	0	0	0	—		0	0	8	0
Ashton United	2006–07	NPL – Premier Division	1	0	0	0	—		0	0	1	0
Ashton United	Total		9	0	0	0	0	0	0	0	9	0
Shrewsbury Town	2006–07	League Two	7	0	1	0	0	0	4 (Note: Two appearances in the Football League Trophy and two in the League Two play-offs)	0	12	0
Shrewsbury Town	2007–08	League Two	7	0	0	0	0	0	0	0	7	0
Shrewsbury Town	Total		14	0	1	0	0	0	4	0	19	0
Kidderminster Harriers (loan)	2007–08	Conference Premier	6	0	0	0	—		1 (Note: Appearance in the Conference League Cup)	0	7	0
Kidderminster Harriers	2008–09	Conference Premier	30	1	1	0	—		1 (Note: Appearance in the FA Trophy)	0	32	1
Kidderminster Harriers	Total		36	1	1	0	0	0	2	0	39	1
Mansfield Town	2009–10	Conference Premier	25	2	2	0	—		0	0	27	2
Mansfield Town	Total		25	2	2	0	0	0	0	0	27	2
Forest Green Rovers	2010–11	Conference Premier	45	2	1	0	—		0	0	46	2
Forest Green Rovers	Total		45	2	1	0	0	0	0	0	46	2
Kidderminster Harriers	2011–12	Conference Premier	39	4	0	0	—		0	0	39	4
Kidderminster Harriers	Total		39	4	0	0	0	0	0	0	39	4
Mansfield Town	2012–13	Conference Premier	32	8	0	0	—		0	0	32	8
Mansfield Town	Total		32	8	0	0	0	0	0	0	32	8
Stevenage	2013–14	League One	26	0	4	0	1	0	2 (Note: Appearances in the Football League Trophy)	0	33	0
Stevenage	Total		26	0	4	0	1	0	2	0	33	0
Tamworth	2016–17	National League North	28	0	0	0	—		0	0	28	0
Tamworth	2017–18	National League North	36	1	0	0	—		0	0	36	1
Tamworth	Total		64	1	0	0	0	0	0	0	64	1
Stafford Rangers	2018–19	Northern Premier League Premier Division	36	4	0	0	—		0	0	36	4
Stafford Rangers	2019–20	Northern Premier League Premier Division	9	0	0	0	—		0	0	9	0
Stafford Rangers	Total		45	4	0	0	0	0	0	0	45	4
Career totals			335	22	9	0	1	0	8	0	353	22
