= Chris Mackenzie =

English footballer (born 1972)

Personal information
- Full name: Christopher Neil MacKenzie
- Date of birth: 14 May 1972 (age 54)
- Place of birth: Northampton, England
- Height: 6 ft 0 in (1.83 m)
- Position: Goalkeeper

Senior career*
Years	Team	Apps	(Gls)
1993–1994	Corby Town	47	
1994–1997	Hereford United	60	(1)
1994	→ Rushden & Diamonds (loan)	6	
1998–1999	Leyton Orient	26	(0)
1999–2003	Nuneaton Borough	153	(0)
2003–2004	Telford United	39	(0)
2004	→ Hereford United (loan)	0	(0)
2004–2006	Chester City	54	(0)
2006–2008	Shrewsbury Town	20	(0)
2007	→ Kidderminster Harriers (loan)	9	(0)
2008	Kidderminster Harriers	12	(0)
2008–2010	Hinckley United	97	(0)
2010–2011	Corby Town	22	(0)
2011	Alfreton Town	19	(0)
2011–2012	Corby Town	28	(0)
Total		592	(1)
- * Club domestic league appearances and goals

Christopher Neil Mackenzie (born 14 May 1972) is an English former footballer. He was a goalkeeper and most recently played for Corby Town in the Conference North.

== Career ==
Mackenzie has also played for Hereford United and even scored a goal for them. The goal was scored against Barnet on the opening day of the 1995–96 season and the conceding goalkeeper was Maik Taylor, who was making his league début. As well as Shrewsbury and Hereford and several non-league clubs, Mackenzie has played in the Football League for Leyton Orient and Chester City.

Mackenzie signed for Shrewsbury on 15 May 2006 on the Bosman ruling from Chester City, where he had spent two years as predominantly first choice goalkeeper. He started the season as second choice goalkeeper behind Ryan Esson, but was handed his club début on 22 August 2006 in the League Cup match at Birmingham City, which Town lost 1–0. By mid-September Mackenzie had gained a spot in the starting line-up, and shortly afterwards, Esson suffered an injury in a reserve fixture, giving Mackenzie a chance to make an extended run in the team.

As Esson continued to struggle, Mackenzie found himself competing with loanee Scott Shearer for a place in the starting eleven. In the closing month of the season Shearer was being picked ahead of Mackenzie but (due to an agreement made prior to his loan signing) was not allowed to play against his parent-club Bristol Rovers in the League Two play-off final. At the age of 35, MacKenzie subsequently got his chance to line up at Wembley for the first time, though Shrewsbury succumbed to a 3–1 defeat.

On 21 September 2007, Mackenzie joined Conference side Kidderminster Harriers on a month-long loan to provide cover for the injured Scott Bevan. Despite having a bad debut at Aggborough, this was later extended by a further month, and he returned to Shrewsbury in November. However, Mackenzie made the permanent move to Kidderminster on 31 January 2008, as part of a deal that saw Bevan move in the opposite direction.

At the end of the 2007–08 season he was released by Kidderminster Harriers. Mackenzie then signed for Hinckley United in May 2008.

He rejoined his first club, Corby Town in May 2010, before signing for Alfreton Town in 2011. He helped Alfreton win promotion into the Conference Premier but Alfreton decided to turn to a full-time football club and Mackenzie did not wish to give up his career outside of football so rejoined Corby Town at the start of the 2011–12 season.

Mackenzie retired from football on 29 February 2012, during a team meeting which followed Corby Town's 3–1 home win against Long Buckby in the Hillier Senior Cup Semi-final, in which all the players were asked to take a pay-cut. This announcement came shortly after Mackenzie broke the record for being the oldest player ever to play for Corby Town.

== Honours ==
- Football League Two play-off finalists, 2006–07, Shrewsbury Town.
