= Pannone solicitors =

Pannone LLP
- Company type: Limited liability partnership
- Headquarters: Manchester, UK
- Number of locations: 4
- Services: Solicitors
- Number of employees: 600
- Divisions: Corporate Services Dispute Resolution & Regulatory; Family, Personal & Financial; Injury & Negligence Pannone Affinity Solutions
- Website: www.pannone.com

Pannone LLP was a law firm based in the UK, with offices in Manchester and London and satellite offices in Cheshire. The firm advised clients throughout the UK and internationally.

== Overview ==
Emma Holt is the firm’s managing partner and Steven Grant the senior partner. With roots that date back to 1852, it was one of the largest in the Manchester area with over 100 partners, 300 lawyers and a total staff of over 600 people.

== Recognition ==
Pannone placed in the top six in The Sunday Times 100 Best Companies to Work For list for mid companies each year from 2004 to 2009, and ranked 18th in 2010.

It was taken over by Slater & Gordon in 2014.

== See also ==
- Co-op Legal Services
