= Stephen Hindmarch =

English footballer

Personal information
- Full name: Stephen David Hindmarch
- Date of birth: 16 November 1989 (age 36)
- Place of birth: Penrith, England
- Height: 5 ft 10 in (1.78 m)
- Position: Striker

Youth career
- –2006: Carlisle United

Senior career*
Years	Team	Apps	(Gls)
2006–2008	Carlisle United	7	(0)
2008–2009	Shrewsbury Town	3	(0)
2010–2011	Workington	15	(0)
2011–2013	Hawke's Bay United	27	(1)
2013–2014	Workington	34	(2)
2014	Kingston		
- * Club domestic league appearances and goals

Stephen David Hindmarch (born 16 November 1989) is an English former footballer who played as an attacking midfielder or striker.

== Early life ==
Hindmarch was born in Penrith, Cumbria and grew up in the Lake District town of Keswick. When Hindmarch grew up he was a keen footballer and cricket player, and his main strength in cricket was his batting.

== Footballing career ==
=== Carlisle United ===
==== Youth ====
Hindmarch, aged 14, playing in Carlisle United's Under-14 team, was attracting the interest of Premiership, but he decided to stay with his local professional club, signing YTS forms. After signing for the club, Hindmarch played both for the youth and reserve teams at the Brunton Park club.

==== First team ====
On 3 September 2006, Hindmarch aged 16 years and 291 days old and a first year YTS player was on the substitutes bench for the game against Cheltenham Town (he was given the squad number 28) after Michael Bridges moved on to Hull City and scoring against Bury's reserve team on 30 August 2006 the game finished 3–3,. this was only Hindmarch's fourth reserve match,. United manager Neil McDonald who was at the game was impressed with the goal. He made his début for the 1st team on 9 September 2006, aged 16 years and 297 days, coming on as an 86th minute substitute replacing Simon Hackney in the process during the 1–1 draw against Northampton Town. He would go on to appear 10 times for Carlisle during the 2006–07 all as substitute, failing to score any goals. During the 2007–08 season Hindmarch failed to regain a first team place and he was released in May 2008.

=== Shrewsbury Town ===
However, in May 2008, Hindmarch was signed by former Carlisle United manager Paul Simpson for League Two Shrewsbury Town, alongside former teammate Paul Murray. He was among 8 players released after the play-off defeat to Gillingham at Wembley.

On 5 June 2009 Hindmarch joined Workington in the Conference North ahead of the new season. In 2014, he went abroad to Canada to sign with Kingston of the Canadian Soccer League.

== Career statistics ==
Club Performance
Club	Season	League		FA Cup		League Cup		Europe		Others		Total
Club	Season	App	Goals	App	Goals	App	Goals	App	Goals	App	Goals	App	Goals
Shrewsbury Town	2008–09	0	0	0	0	0	0	0	0	0	0	0	0
Carlisle United	2007–08	0	0	0	0	0	0	0	0	0	0	0	0
Carlisle United	2006–07	7	0	1	0	1	0	0	0	1	0	10	0
Career total		7	0	1	0	1	0	0	0	1	0	10	0

== Cricket career ==
Stephen represented the North of England Cricket team at U15 level. He currently plays for his home team Keswick Cricket Club.

== Family ==
Stephen's brother, Paul, is a young cricketer at Durham CCC's academy. In winter 2008 Paul played in Australia for Wanneroo.
