= George Daly (footballer) =

English footballer (born 1990)

Personal information
- Full name: George Jeffrey Daly
- Date of birth: 25 October 1990 (age 36)
- Place of birth: Westminster, England
- Height: 5 ft 11 in (1.80 m)
- Position: Forward

Team information
- Current team: Hendon

Youth career
- 2003–2007: Wycombe Wanderers

Senior career*
| Years | Team | Apps | (Gls) |
| 2007–2010 | Wycombe Wanderers | 2 | (0) |
| 2009 | → Hayes & Yeading United (loan) | 15 | (2) |
| 2010 | Bishop's Stortford | 3 | (0) |
| 2010–2012 | Wealdstone | | |
| 2012– | Hendon | 2 | (0) |
- * Club domestic league appearances and goals as of 10:32, 27 November 2012 (UTC)

George Jeffrey Daly (25 October 1990) is an English football forward who plays for Hendon having previously played league football for Wycombe Wanderers.

Daly joined Wycombe at the age of 13 after impressing in a trial period, and went on to become the top scorer in their Under-16 team. After signing his first apprenticeship contract in 2007, Daly scored eleven goals before Christmas for the Under-18s, including three hat-tricks, and earned a call-up to the senior squad for the first time for the home match with Macclesfield Town.

He featured in the matches with Brentford and Shrewsbury Town at the end of 2007 under then manager Paul Lambert. After completing his apprenticeship at the club, Daly was offered a one-year professional contract, lasting until summer 2010.

Daly began the 2009–10 season on loan with the Conference National club Hayes & Yeading United.

Daly was released by the Wycombe manager Gary Waddock at the end of his contract. He started the 2010–11 season out of the game before being signed by the Isthmian League side Wealdstone.

In August 2012, he joined the Isthmian League side Hendon on a free transfer.
