= Marc Tierney =

English footballer

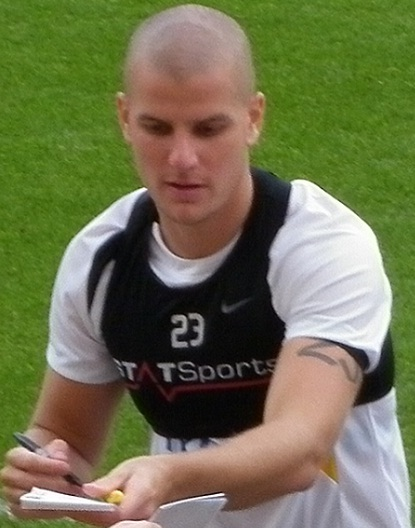
- Tierney at Carrow Road in 2012

Personal information
- Full name: Marc Peter Tierney
- Date of birth: 23 August 1985 (age 41)
- Place of birth: Prestwich, England
- Height: 1.83 m (6 ft 0 in)
- Position: Left-back

Youth career
- ?–2003: Oldham Athletic

Senior career*
Years	Team	Apps	(Gls)
2003–2007	Oldham Athletic	37	(0)
2004–2005	→ Carlisle United (loan)	10	(0)
2007–2009	Shrewsbury Town	79	(1)
2008–2009	→ Colchester United (loan)	6	(0)
2009–2011	Colchester United	74	(1)
2011–2013	Norwich City	34	(0)
2013–2015	Bolton Wanderers	8	(0)
Total		248	(2)
- * Club domestic league appearances and goals

Marc Peter Tierney (born 23 August 1985) is an English former professional footballer. Predominantly a left-back, Tierney could play in other positions, such as centre-back. His brother Paul is also a retired professional footballer.

A graduate of the Oldham Athletic Academy where he made his debut in 2003, he also played for Carlisle United, Shrewsbury Town, Colchester United, Norwich City, and Bolton Wanderers.

== Club career ==
Born in Prestwich, Greater Manchester, Tierney rose through the youth ranks at Oldham Athletic, making his professional debut for Oldham in a League Cup match in August of the 2003–04 season, against Scunthorpe United. In December 2004 he went to Carlisle United on loan for a three-month spell under Paul Simpson.

In January 2007, Tierney was signed by Shrewsbury Town in a two-and-a-half-year deal. He was a regular in the Shrewsbury side during the closing months of the 2006–07 season, as Town reached the League Two playoff final at Wembley. Notably, Tierney was sent off in the dying minutes of that game, making him only the second player to suffer this fate at the new stadium, and meaning he would miss the first game of the 2007–08 season.

In spite of Shrewsbury's disappointing 2007–08 season, Tierney enjoyed excellent personal form. His consistently dependable performances earned him both the fans' and players' player of the year awards.

=== Colchester United ===
On 27 November 2008, Tierney joined Colchester United on an initial five-week loan. The move was made permanent in the January transfer window. Tierney received his 1st red card against former employers Oldham.

=== Norwich City ===
On 12 January 2011, Tierney signed for Championship side Norwich City and was handed the number 32 shirt. The move came despite Tierney saying he would not move to Norwich "in a million years". He made his debut for The Canaries against Crystal Palace at Selhurst Park as a substitute for Adam Drury in a 0–0 draw, and made his first start in the 2–1 win over Millwall at Carrow Road. Once Norwich had completed promotion he joined in with the mass celebrations by doing numerous cartwheels on the pitch. He repeated a similar celebration during a pre-season friendly against Real Zaragoza when two of the floodlights failed after a lightning strike to "entertain the fans". Tierney was given squad number 23 ahead of the 2011–12 Premier League season and started on the opening day of the season. He was the only player to start the first 6 games of the season, establishing himself as first choice left back. He is affectionately known as "Mad Marc" by the Norwich fans. Tierney continued his run in the team, starting all of the games up to Christmas until a serious injury ruled him out for the rest of the season of what was an impressive season for the team. At the end of the 2012–13 season, it was announced Tierney was not to be given a new contract, allowing him to look for other clubs on a free transfer.

=== Bolton Wanderers ===
Following his release from Norwich City, Bolton Wanderers announced that Tierney would be joining the club when his contract with Norwich expired on 30 June 2013. He made his debut for Bolton in their 1–1 draw with Lancashire rivals Burnley on 3 August 2013. Tierney established himself as Bolton's first choice left-back before suffering an ankle injury in the club's 1–1 draw with Yeovil Town at the Reebok Stadium meaning a lengthy spell on the sidelines.

=== Retirement ===
On 23 April 2015, Tierney announced his retirement from professional football at the age of 29 after failing to recover from his ankle injury.

During 2024-25 season, he became Director of Football at Altrincham FC.

In May 2025, he was appointed Head Of Football Operations at Carlisle United.

== International career ==
Aside from England, Tierney is also eligible to play for the Republic of Ireland national team. His brother Paul has previously represented Republic of Ireland at U21 level. Giovanni Trapattoni and Marco Tardelli were reported to have been keeping an eye on him ahead of Ireland's participation in UEFA Euro 2012.

== Personal life ==
Marc is the brother of former Livingston player Paul Tierney.

== Career statistics ==
Appearances and goals by club, season and competition
Club	Season	League			FA Cup		League Cup		Europe		Total	
Club	Season	Division	Apps	Goals	Apps	Goals	Apps	Goals	Apps	Goals	Apps	Goals
Oldham Athletic	2002–03	Division Two	0	0	0	0	0	0	0	0	0	0
Oldham Athletic	2003–04	Division Two	2	0	0	0	1	0	0	0	3	0
Oldham Athletic	2004–05	League One	11	0	0	0	0	0	0	0	11	0
Oldham Athletic	2005–06	League One	9	0	3	0	1	0	0	0	23	0
Oldham Athletic	2006–07	League One	5	0	1	0	1	0	0	0	7	0
Oldham Athletic	Total		37	0	4	0	3	0	0	0	44	0
Carlisle United (loan)	2004–05	Conference National	10	0	0	0	0	0	0	0	10	0
Shrewsbury Town	2006–07	League Two	18	0	0	0	0	0	0	0	18	0
Shrewsbury Town	2007–08	League Two	43	1	1	0	2	0	0	0	46	1
Shrewsbury Town	2008–09	League Two	18	0	1	0	1	0	0	0	20	0
Shrewsbury Town	Total		79	1	2	0	3	0	0	0	84	1
Colchester United (loan)	2008–09	League One	6	0	0	0	0	0	0	0	6	0
Colchester United	2008–09	League One	20	1	0	0	0	0	0	0	20	1
Colchester United	2009–10	League One	41	0	3	0	0	0	0	0	44	0
Colchester United	2010–11	League One	13	0	1	0	1	0	0	0	15	0
Colchester United	Total		74	1	4	0	1	0	0	0	79	1
Norwich City	2010–11	Championship	16	0	0	0	0	0	0	0	16	0
Norwich City	2011–12	Premier League	17	0	0	0	0	0	0	0	17	0
Norwich City	2012–13	Premier League	1	0	2	0	1	0	0	0	4	0
Norwich City	Total		33	0	0	0	0	0	0	0	33	0
Bolton Wanderers	2013–14	Championship	8	0	0	0	1	0	0	0	9	0
Career total			240	2	10	0	7	0	0	0	251	2

- Does not include Football League Trophy appearances.

== Honours ==
Norwich City

- Football League Championship runners-up: 2010–11
