= Paul Murray (footballer) =

English footballer (born 1976)

Personal information
- Date of birth: 31 August 1976 (age 50)
- Place of birth: Carlisle, Cumbria, England
- Height: 5 ft 8 in (1.73 m)
- Position: Midfielder

Team information
- Current team: Oldham Athletic (academy manager)

Senior career*
Years	Team	Apps	(Gls)
1994–1996	Carlisle United	41	(1)
1996	→ Queens Park Rangers (loan)	1	(0)
1996–2001	Queens Park Rangers	139	(7)
2001	Southampton	1	(0)
2001–2004	Oldham Athletic	95	(15)
2004–2006	Beira-Mar	17	(2)
2006–2007	Carlisle United	14	(1)
2007–2008	Gretna	32	(1)
2008–2010	Shrewsbury Town	59	(2)
2010–2013	Hartlepool United	98	(2)
2013	Oldham Athletic	0	(0)
Total		497	(31)

International career
1997	England U21	4	(0)
1998	England B	1	(0)

Managerial career
- 2014: Hartlepool United
- 2019: Carlisle United (joint caretaker)
- 2023: Oldham Athletic (caretaker)
- * Club domestic league appearances and goals

Paul Murray (born 31 August 1976) is an English football coach and former professional player, who is the academy manager of Oldham Athletic.

== Playing career ==
Murray was born on 31 August 1976, in Carlisle, Cumbria, England. He started his career at Carlisle United and made his Football League debut for them on 27 December 1993, coming on as a substitute against Darlington. In May 1996 he joined Queens Park Rangers on loan, making his debut at Nottingham Forest. After the Hoops' relegation that season, he joined the team permanently for a transfer fee of £300,000. Whilst at QPR he was called up four times for the England U21 squad, and in February 1998 he made his solitary appearance for England B as a substitute against Chile. He enjoyed a successful time at Loftus Road, playing 140 league games before he joined Premiership club Southampton in July 2001, though he played only one game for the south coast side.

In December 2001 Murray joined Oldham Athletic, where he spent three and a half years, before he joined Portuguese club Beira-Mar. He re-joined Carlisle United in the close-season of 2006 after their promotion to League One, and scored against Doncaster Rovers in the opening game of the 2006–07 season. This was the first match for new manager Neil McDonald. He was released by the club in May 2007.

Murray joined newly promoted Scottish Premier League outfit Gretna in June 2007 on a one-year contract.

With his contract expired at Gretna, Murray turned down a number of clubs to move south of the border and join League Two side Shrewsbury Town in May 2008, alongside former teammate Stephen Hindmarch. After two years at the club he was released on 14 May 2010.

He joined Hartlepool United on trial in the summer of 2010 and signed a short-term deal with the club in August 2010. Murray extended his contract with Hartlepool and won their player of the year trophy in the 2011–12 season. Murray was released by Hartlepool midway through the 2012–13 season, and re-signed by Oldham Athletic on a contract until the end of the season, returning to the club after almost nine years.

== Management career ==
Murray completed his coaching badges alongside former Manchester United and England defender Phil Neville.

After a successful spell as a coach at Oldham Athletic, Murray joined League Two club Hartlepool United as manager on 23 October 2014, with Willie Donachie assisting him. Murray was sacked by Hartlepool following defeat by non-League club Blyth Spartans just six weeks after taking the reins at the League Two club.

In the summer of 2015, Murray was appointed as a coach at Barrow, but departed the club on 4 September, after seven games of the season.

Murray joined Fleetwood Town as the head coach of their development squad in November 2016. On 13 June 2018, Murray left Fleetwood Town to become first-team coach at Carlisle United.

In June 2023, Murray returned to Oldham Athletic as academy manager. On 12 October 2023, he was appointed caretaker manager for upcoming FA Cup qualifying match against Altrincham, following the departure of previous interim manager Steve Thompson.

== Managerial statistics ==
As of match played 31 December 2023

Managerial record by team and tenure
Team	Nat	From	To	Record								Ref
Team	Nat	From	To	G	W	D	L	GF	GA	GD	Win %	Ref
Hartlepool United	(England)	23 October 2014	6 December 2014	7	1	1	5	8	13	−5	14.29	
Carlisle United (joint caretaker)	(England)	4 January 2019	16 January 2019	2	1	0	1	3	5	−2	50.00	
Oldham Athletic (caretaker)	(England)	14 October 2023	14 October 2023	1	1	0	0	1	0	+1	100.00	
Total				10	3	1	6	12	18	−6	30.00	—

== Honours ==
Individual

- Hartlepool United Player of the Year: 2012
