= List of Hereford United F.C. players =

This is a list of Hereford United F.C. players which covers the era from the beginning of the 1972–73 season to the present day.

Players who featured for the club before the beginning of the 1972–73 season are not included. If a listed player appeared for the club before this threshold (for example Colin Addison and Ronnie Radford), their appearances and goals prior to this threshold are not included in their totals.

== Players ==
Correct as of 7 December 2010

Name	Pos.	Years	League (Note: Includes Football League, Football Conference)		FA Cup		Other (Note: Includes League Cup, Football League Trophy, Welsh Cup, FA Trophy, play-offs)		Total		Ref.
Name	Pos.	Years	Apps	Goals	Apps	Goals	Apps	Goals	Apps	Goals	Ref.
(Wales) Gareth Abraham	DF	1993–1994	49	2	0	0	8	0	57	2	
(England) Chris Adamson	GK	2009–2010	1	0	0	0	0	0	1	0	
(England) Colin Addison	MF	1971–1973	23	1	2	0	0	0	25	1	
(Albania) Astrit Ajdarević	MF	2010	1	0	0	0	0	0	1	0	
(England) Tony Agana	FW	1997–1998	27	9	1	0	1	1	29	10	
(England) Lionel Ainsworth	MF	2007–2008; 2008–2009	22	7	2	1	2	3	26	11	
(Nigeria) Ade Akinbiyi	FW	1994	4	2	0	0	0	0	4	2	
(England) Trevor Ames	FW	1980–1982	8	0	0	0	0	0	8	8	
(England) Colin Anderson	MF	1992–1994	70	1	4	0	14	0	88	1	
(Spain) Godwin Antwi	DF	2009	5	0	0	0	0	0	5	0	
(England) Joe Anyinsah	MF	2005	3	0	0	0	3	0	6	0	
(Antigua and Barbuda) Moses Ashikodi	FW	2008	6	0	0	0	2	1	8	1	
(England) Matt Bailey	FW	2005	5	1	2	0	1	1	8	2	
(England) Mike Bailey	MF	1978–1979	16	1	0	0	4	0	20	1	
(England) Matt Baker	GK	2000–2004	124	0	7	0	11	0	142	0	
(England) Peta B'alac	GK	1973–1974	2	0	0	0	1	0	3	0	
(England) Neil Barnes	GK	2001	1	0	0	0	0	0	1	0	
(England) Dean Barrick	DF	2002	7	0	0	0	0	0	7	0	
(England) Adam Bartlett	GK	2009–2012	110	0	7	0	10	0	127	0	
(England) Neal Bartlett	MF	1996–1997	3	0	0	0	0	0	3	0	
(England) Danny Bartley	MF	1980–1983	114	6	2	0	17	3	133	9	
(England) Frank Barton	MF	1978	22	3	0	0	3	1	25	4	
(Spain) Guillem Bauzà	FW	2010–2011	12	2	3	0	1	0	16	2	
(England) Gary Beacock	MF	1983–1985	27	4	1	0	8	3	36	7	
(England) Matthew Beale	FW	1999–2000	1	0	0	0	0	0	1	0	
(England) Dean Beckwith	DF	2005–2009	128	5	10	0	15	0	153	5	
(England) Mark Beesley	FW	2003–2004	12	2	0	0	3	0	15	2	
(England) Carl Beeston	MF	1997	9	2	0	0	0	0	9	2	
(England) Gary Bell	DF	1974	8	0	0	0	0	0	8	0	
(England) Ian Benbow	MF	1987–1991	83	4	4	0	25	3	112	7	
(Jamaica) Trevor Benjamin	FW	2007–2008	34	10	6	1	3	0	43	11	
(England) Robert Betts	MF	2004	5	0	0	0	2	0	7	0	
(England) Fred Binney	FW	1980–1982	27	6	0	0	0	0	27	6	
(England) Alan Birchenall	MF	1979–1980	11	0	1	0	0	0	12	0	
(Scotland) John Black	MF	1983–1984	9	0	0	0	2	0	11	0	
(England) Danny Blanchett	DF	2009	13	0	2	0	1	0	16	0	
(England) Steve Blatherwick	DF	1995	10	1	0	0	2	0	12	2	
(England) Darren Blewitt	DF	2005	11	0	0	0	0	0	11	0	
(Scotland) Jim Blyth	GK	1975	7	0	0	0	0	0	7	0	
(England) Chris Boden	DF	1998	4	0	0	0	0	0	4	0	
(England) Bryan Bouston	DF	1977–1978	6	0	0	0	0	0	6	0	
(England) Gary Bowyer	DF	1989–1990	14	2	4	0	0	0	18	2	
(England) Ian Bowyer	MF	1987–1990	40	1	2	0	6	0	48	1	
(England) Russell Bradley	DF	1989–1991	89	4	1	0	28	0	118	4	
(Australia) Jon Brady	MF	2005–2006	20	0	4	1	3	0	27	1	
(England) Simon Brain	FW	1990–1994	87	20	8	4	13	2	108	26	
(Scotland) Drew Brand	GK	1980–1982	54	0	7	0	7	0	68	0	
(Saint Kitts and Nevis) Febian Brandy	FW	2009	15	4	0	0	0	0	15	4	
(Wales) Ian Bray	DF	1981–1984	108	4	8	0	17	1	133	5	
(England) Les Briley	MF	1976–1978	61	2	2	1	4	0	67	3	
(England) Karl Broadhurst	DF	2007–2009	48	1	3	0	3	0	54	1	
(England) John Brough	DF	1994–1998	112	7	9	1	13	0	134	8	
(England) David Brown	FW	2003–2005	67	22	5	1	12	3	84	26	
(England) Wayne Brown	GK	2005–2008	116	0	10	0	6	0	132	0	
(Scotland) Willie Brown	FW	1974	9	5	0	0	0	0	9	5	
(Wales) Marcus Browning	MF	1992	7	5	0	0	1	1	8	6	
(England) Andy Brownrigg	DF	1994–1995	8	0	0	0	1	0	9	0	
(England) Steve Bull	FW	2000–2001	7	2	0	0	5	0	12	2	
(England) Phil Burrows	DF	1976–1980	110	2	5	0	6	0	121	2	
(England) Paul Burton	FW	1989–1992	5	1	0	0	2	3	7	4	
(England) Paul Butler	MF	1984–1987	80	4	1	0	11	1	92	5	
(Republic of Ireland) Tony Byrne	DF	1974–1977	55	0	2	0	12	2	69	2	
(Scotland) Harry Caffrey	MF	1991–1992	17	2	0	0	3	0	20	2	
(Scotland) Mick Campbell	MF	1988	1	0	0	0	0	0	1	0	
(Northern Ireland) Ray Campbell	MF	1988	4	0	0	0	1	0	5	0	
(England) Sean Canham	FW	2010–2013	26	5	3	0	2	0	31	5	
(England) Len Cantello	MF	1982	1	0	0	0	0	0	1	0	
(Northern Ireland) Tony Capaldi	DF	2001–2002	12	0	2	0	0	0	14	0	
(England) Danny Carey-Bertram	FW	2003–2006	73	17	5	1	20	8	98	26	
(England) Michael Carter	MF	1983–1987	97	11	6	3	20	2	123	16	
(England) Roy Carter	MF	1975–1977	71	9	4	1	13	3	88	13	
(England) David Carver	DF	1973–1974	14	0	0	0	2	0	16	0	
(England) Ray Cashley	GK	1981	20	0	0	0	6	0	26	0	
(Wales) Wayne Cegielski	DF	1985–1987	50	2	2	0	14	0	66	2	
(England) Nick Chadwick	FW	2008–2009	10	1	1	0	1	0	12	1	
Kevin Charlton	GK	1975–1978	52	0	4	0	8	0	64	0	
(England) Howard Clark	MF	1993–1995	55	7	2	0	15	0	72	7	
(England) Dean Clarke	DF	1993–1996	11	0	0	0	0	0	11	0	
Matt Clarke	DF	1998–2003	145	8	5	0	15	2	165	10	
Steve Clements	MF	1993–1994	7	0	0	0	2	0	9	0	
(England) Joe Colbeck	MF	2010–2012	71	6	4	0	4	0	79	6	
(England) Stacy Coldicott	MF	2005–2006	5	0	0	0	0	0	5	0	
(England) Kevin Collins	DF	1998–1999	6	0	0	0	2	0	8	0	
(England) Lee Collins	DF	2007–2008	16	0	4	0	0	0	20	0	
(England) Alan Connell	FW	2006–2007	44	9	4	1	2	0	50	10	
(England) Leon Constantine	FW	2009–2010	35	6	1	0	4	2	40	8	
Garry Cook	MF	1996–1999	65	5	6	1	6	0	77	6	
(England) Scott Cooksey	GK	2000–2002	57	0	1	0	10	0	68	0	
(Wales) Stuart Cornes	DF	1978–1981	93	3	3	0	14	1	110	4	
Albano Correia	FW	2002	6	3	0	0	0	0	6	3	
John Cotterill	DF	1999	3	0	0	0	0	0	3	0	
Jimmy Coughlin	FW	1977	2	1	0	0	0	0	2	1	
(Republic of Ireland) Tony Cousins	FW	1992–1993	3	0	2	0	2	1	7	1	
(England) Steve Cowe	FW	1999	14	2	0	0	0	0	14	2	
(France) Bertrand Cozic	MF	2004	2	0	0	0	1	0	3	0	
(England) John Crabbe	MF	1982–1983	16	2	1	0	3	0	20	2	
Andy Crane	DF	1988–1989	32	0	0	0	10	0	42	0	
Dean Craven	MF	2003–2004	11	0	1	0	3	0	15	0	
Steve Crompton	FW	1977–1979	34	6	1	0	1	0	36	6	
Jon Cross	DF	1996–1997	5	1	0	0	1	0	6	1	
Mark Cross	MF	1992–1993	1	0	0	0	0	0	1	0	
Matthew Cross	DF	1998–1999	8	0	0	0	0	0	8	0	
Nicky Cross	FW	1994–1996	65	14	6	1	14	3	85	18	
Seamus Crowe	MF	2001	4	0	0	0	0	0	4	0	
Paul Culpin	FW	1992	2	0	0	0	0	0	2	0	
Dave Cunningham	MF	1979–1980	30	2	2	0	0	0	32	2	
Ian Dalziel	DF	1983–1988	150	8	9	0	30	3	189	11	
Steve Davey	MF	1975–1978	107	32	8	1	15	4	130	37	
Danny Davidson	FW	2001–2002	12	0	1	0	1	0	14	0	
(Wales) Gareth Davies	DF	1992–1995	95	2	4	0	16	0	115	2	
Kevin Davies	MF	1985	1	0	0	0	0	0	1	0	
Mike Davis	FW	1994	1	0	0	0	0	0	1	0	
Andy de Bont	GK	1996–1998	37	0	7	0	6	0	50	0	
Nick Deacy	FW	1974–1975	17	2	0	0	1	0	18	2	
John Delve	MF	1983–1987	118	11	5	0	25	3	148	14	
Darren Dennehy	DF	2009	10	0	0	0	3	0	13	0	
Robbie Dennison	MF	1998–1999	19	2	0	0	0	0	19	2	
Steve Devine	DF	1985–1993	272	4	18	0	58	1	348	5	
Toumani Diagouraga	MF	2007–2009	86	4	8	0	4	0	98	4	
Ross Diamond	MF	2002	3	0	0	0	0	0	3	0	
Ian Dobson	DF	1980–1982	41	5	6	0	5	0	52	5	
Paul Dobson	FW	1990	6	1	0	0	0	0	6	1	
Matt Done	MF	2008–2010	55	0	2	0	6	1	63	1	
Keith Downing	MF	1995–1999	59	1	3	0	9	0	71	1	
(England) Paul Downing	DF	2010	6	0	0	0	0	0	6	0	
Greg Downs	DF	1991–1994	108	2	10	0	17	0	135	2	
Mark Druce	FW	1998–1999	19	3	1	0	1	0	21	3	
John Dungworth	FW	1981	7	3	0	0	0	0	7	3	
Ryan Durham	DF	1997–1998	1	0	0	0	0	0	1	0	
Wayne Dyer	MF	1998–1999	6	1	0	0	0	0	6	1	
(England) Clint Easton	MF	2007–2009	51	3	5	0	5	1	61	4	
(England) Lateef Elford-Alliyu	FW	2010	1	0	0	0	0	0	1	0	
Tony Elliott	GK	1988–1992	75	0	6	0	28	0	109	0	
Lee Ellison	FW	1996	1	0	0	0	0	0	1	0	
Rob Elmes	FW	1999–2002	111	36	8	1	14	6	133	43	
Steve Emery	MF	1972–1979	279	12	17	0	37	2	333	14	
Chukki Eribenne	FW	2002	3	0	2	0	1	2	6	2	
Ryan Esson	GK	2008	1	0	0	0	0	0	1	0	
(England) John Eustace	MF	2006	8	0	0	0	0	0	8	0	
Brian Evans	MF	1973–1975	48	9	6	1	6	1	60	11	
Darren Evans	DF	1995–1996	24	0	4	0	5	0	33	0	
Graham Evans	FW	2005–2006	7	0	2	0	5	0	14	0	
(Wales) Zac Evans	MF	2010–?	0	0	0	0	1	0	1	0	
Lee Evans	GK	2001–2002	1	0	0	0	0	0	1	0	
Stuart Evans	DF	1998–1999	24	1	0	0	2	0	26	1	
Paul Eversham	MF	1993–1995	13	1	0	0	3	0	16	1	
Mark Farrington	FW	1994	1	0	0	0	0	0	1	0	
(England) Nicky Featherstone	MF	2010–2012	65	1	6	0	1	0	72	1	
Keith Fear	FW	1977	6	0	0	0	0	0	6	0	
Viv Fear	FW	1974	3	0	0	0	1	0	4	0	
Andy Feeley	DF	1979–1980	51	3	2	0	2	0	55	3	
(England) Andy Ferrell	MF	2005–2007	52	2	7	1	11	0	70	3	
Paul Fewings	FW	1998–2000	36	15	4	2	2	0	42	17	
Murray Fishlock	DF	1994–1998	110	6	9	1	13	0	132	7	
Jordan Fitzpatrick	MF	2006–2008	1	0	0	0	0	0	1	0	
(Wales) Stuart Fleetwood	FW	2006–2007; 2010–	60	12	5	0	8	3	73	15	
Micky Forsyth	DF	1996	12	0	0	0	0	0	12	0	
Adrian Foster	FW	1996–1997	43	16	1	0	5	1	49	17	
Ian Foster	FW	1996–1998	36	3	3	0	5	0	44	3	
James Fox	FW	2002	4	0	0	0	0	0	4	0	
Carl Francis	MF	1983–1984	5	0	0	0	0	0	5	0	
Roger Freestone	GK	1990	8	0	0	0	0	0	8	0	
Chris Fry	MF	1991–1993	90	10	10	1	18	2	118	13	
John Galley	FW	1974–1977	80	10	1	0	9	0	90	10	
Mick Galloway	MF	2002	9	0	2	0	1	0	12	0	
Alan Gane	MF	1973–1974	9	1	0	0	0	0	9	1	
Matthew Gardiner	DF	2000–2001	16	1	4	0	0	0	18	1	
Mark Gayle	GK	1997	5	0	0	0	0	0	5	0	
Kerry Giddings	FW	2000–2001	25	5	1	0	5	0	31	5	
Paul Gilchrist	FW	1980	11	1	0	0	0	0	11	1	
(Wales) Martyn Giles	DF	2006–2007	13	0	0	2	0	0	15	0	
(Republic of Ireland) Stephen Gleeson	MF	2008	4	0	0	0	0	0	4	0	
Karl Goddard	DF	1990–1992	9	1	0	0	2	1	11	2	
Jonny Godsmark	MF	2009–2010	8	1	1	0	4	1	13	2	
Michael Gonzague	DF	1994–1995	3	0	0	0	1	0	4	0	
Gary Goodchild	FW	1976–1977	4	0	1	0	0	0	5	0	
Scott Goodwin	MF	2001–2002	32	3	2	0	2	0	36	3	
Colin Gordon	FW	1990	6	0	0	0	0	0	6	0	
Bobby Gould	FW	1978–1979	45	13	1	0	2	0	48	13	
Jonathan Gould	GK	2004	14	0	0	0	1	0	15	0	
(England) Josh Gowling	DF	2008–2009	13	0	0	0	0	0	13	0	
John Grant	FW	2002–2003	26	4	0	0	1	0	27	4	
Neil Grayson	FW	1997–1998	24	11	4	4	2	0	30	15	
(Wales) Ryan Green	DF	2003–2006; 2009–	139	4	7	0	28	1	174	5	
David Gregory	MF	1995	2	0	0	0	1	0	3	0	
Harry Gregory	MF	1972–1975	73	6	2	0	3	0	78	6	
(England) Steve Guinan	FW	2002–2004; 2007–2009	162	64	8	3	8	1	178	68	
(Hungary) Peter Gulacsi	GK	2009	18	0	0	0	0	0	18	0	
(England) Phil Gulliver	DF	2006–2007	26	0	5	0	1	0	32	0	
Mel Gwinnett	GK	1982–1983	1	0	0	0	0	0	1	0	
(England) Sam Gwynne	MF	2004–	68	1	6	0	6	0	80	1	
Colin Hall	FW	1972	5	0	0	0	0	0	5	0	
Derek Hall	MF	1991–1994	103	18	11	1	22	3	136	22	
Leigh Hall	MF	1995	2	0	0	0	0	0	2	0	
Bruce Halliday	DF	1985–1987	62	6	3	0	17	0	82	6	
Craig Hanson	MF	1999–2001	18	2	1	0	0	0	19	2	
Chris Hargreaves	MF	1996–1998	99	10	6	2	8	0	113	12	
Nick Harrhy	FW	2002	0	0	0	0	1	0	1	0	
Gerry Harrison	MF	1993	6	0	1	0	2	0	9	0	
Paul Harrison	GK	2006	1	0	0	0	0	0	1	0	
Jim Harvey	MF	1980–1987	278	39	16	2	55	14	349	55	
Karl Hawley	FW	2003	6	1	0	0	0	0	6	1	
(England) Joe Heath	DF	2010–	0	0	1	0	0	0	1	0	
Adrian Heathcock	MF	1992–1993	2	0	0	0	0	0	2	0	
Chris Hemming	MF	1989–1991	41	3	6	0	17	4	64	7	
Damian Henderson	FW	1995	5	0	0	0	0	0	5	0	
John Hendrie	MF	1984	6	0	0	0	1	0	7	0	
Ian Hendry	MF	1979–1980	21	0	0	0	1	0	22	0	
Peter Heritage	FW	1991–1992	57	9	6	1	8	1	71	11	
Sam Hewson	MF	2009	10	3	0	0	0	0	10	3	
Mark Hibbard	DF	1996–1997	7	1	1	0	1	0	9	1	
Keith Hicks	DF	1980–1985	201	2	13	0	28	0	242	2	
Kris Hicks	MF	1997–1998	9	0	0	0	8	0	17	0	
Henry Hill	MF	1978	1	0	0	0	0	0	1	0	
Jon Hill	DF	1997–1999; 2002	3	0	0	0	0	0	3	0	
Jim Hinch	FW	1973–1974	27	7	5	2	1	0	33	9	
Ivan Hollett	FW	1971–1973	11	2	0	0	1	0	12	2	
Billy Holmes	FW	1977–1979	31	5	2	0	3	1	36	6	
Kyle Holmes	MF	1977–1980	28	3	1	0	4	0	33	3	
Richard Holmes	DF	2002	8	0	0	0	0	0	8	0	
Chris Honor	DF	1989	3	0	0	0	0	0	3	0	
(England) Gary Hooper	FW	2008	19	11	0	0	0	0	19	11	
Bradley Hudson-Odoi	FW	2008–2009	16	3	2	0	2	0	20	3	
Tommy Hughes	GK	1973–1982	240	0	12	0	25	0	277	0	
Paul Hunt	DF	1978–1981	51	4	2	0	2	0	55	4	
Michael Husbands	FW	2002–2003	5	0	0	0	1	0	6	0	
Graham Hyde	MF	2004–2005	33	0	3	0	9	0	45	0	
David Icke	GK	1971–1973	37	0	1	0	4	0	42	0	
Sammy Igoe	MF	2008	4	0	0	0	0	0	4	0	
Michael Ingham	GK	2007–2008	0	0	0	0	1	0	1	0	
(Cameroon) Guy Ipoua	FW	2005–2006	19	7	4	0	8	3	31	10	
John Jackson	GK	1982	4	0	0	0	2	0	6	0	
Marlon Jackson	FW	2009	5	0	0	0	2	0	7	0	
(England) Richard Jackson	DF	2008–2009	25	0	0	0	1	0	26	0	
Kristian James	DF	2001	7	0	1	0	0	0	8	0	
Tony James	DF	1994–1996	35	4	1	0	9	2	45	6	
(Wales) Tony James	DF	1998–2006; 2010	279	16	19	1	31	3	329	20	
(France) Alex Jeannin	DF	2005–2007	49	4	7	0	10	0	66	4	
Derek Jefferson	DF	1976–1978	39	0	2	0	0	0	41	0	
Jed Jennings	DF	1991–1992	16	0	0	0	2	0	18	0	
Steve Jennings	MF	2007	11	0	0	0	0	0	11	0	
(England) Jake Jervis	FW	2010	7	2	0	0	0	0	7	2	
Simon Johnson	FW	2007–2009	62	5	6	1	4	0	72	6	
George Johnston	FW	1972–1973	18	5	0	0	3	3	21	8	
Alan Jones	DF	1968–1974	53	2	5	2	3	0	61	4	
(England) Craig Jones	MF	2008–2010	4	0	0	0	1	0	5	0	
Darren Jones	DF	2009–2010	41	3	2	0	4	0	47	3	
David Jones	FW	1978–1980	47	11	2	0	5	1	54	12	
Garry Jones	FW	1980–1981	25	4	2	1	3	1	30	6	
Mark Jones	DF	1987–1991	157	2	9	1	11	0	177	3	
Mark Jones	GK	1998–2000	21	0	5	0	4	0	30	0	
Mark Jones	MF	1989–1990	42	8	4	1	11	2	57	11	
Richard Jones	MF	1988–1993	148	9	9	0	40	7	197	16	
Shane Jones	MF	1989–1992	38	1	0	0	11	0	49	1	
Stuart Jones	GK	2002	4	0	0	0	0	0	4	0	
Roy Jordan	MF	1996–1997	2	0	0	0	0	0	2	0	
Alan Judge	GK	1991–1994	105	0	9	0	18	0	132	0	
Ian Juryeff	FW	1989–1990	28	4	0	0	6	2	34	6	
(France) Samba Kanoute	DF	2010	1	0	0	0	0	0	1	0	
Ollie Kearns	FW	1983–1988	170	58	10	6	33	13	213	77	
Bobby Kellard	MF	1975	3	1	0	0	0	0	3	1	
Fred Kemp	MF	1974–1975	13	2	1	0	4	0	18	2	
Alex Kevan	MF	2001	3	0	1	0	1	0	5	0	
Craig King	FW	2009–2010	26	3	2	0	2	0	30	3	
Jordan King	MF	2003–2004	2	0	1	0	2	0	5	0	
Robbie King	MF	2006	5	1	0	0	0	0	5	1	
Lyndon Knight	GK	1978–1979	2	0	0	0	0	0	2	0	
(Hungary) János Kovács	DF	2010–	6	1	0	0	1	0	7	1	
Mika Kottila	FW	1996	13	1	0	0	0	0	13	1	
Joe Laidlaw	MF	1980–1982	62	8	5	2	14	4	81	14	
Alan Lamb	FW	1989	10	2	0	0	2	0	12	2	
Chris Lane	DF	1998–2001	89	5	6	0	5	0	100	5	
Sean Lane	MF	1980–1983	50	3	3	0	8	0	61	3	
Craig Langford	DF	1992–1994	5	0	0	0	3	0	8	0	
Tony Larkin	DF	1983–1985	35	2	0	0	11	2	46	4	
Nicky Law	DF	1996–1997	14	0	1	0	0	0	15	0	
David Layne	FW	1973	4	0	0	0	0	0	4	0	
John Layton	DF	1974–1981	200	13	12	3	21	3	233	19	
Richard Leadbeater	FW	1997–1999	37	13	1	0	2	0	40	13	
Chris Leadbitter	MF	1986–1988	36	1	2	0	6	0	44	1	
Colin Lee	MF	1974	9	0	2	0	0	0	11	0	
Paul Lee	FW	1972–1975	28	5	2	0	2	0	32	5	
Carl Leonard	DF	1983–1985	30	0	1	0	9	0	40	0	
Gary Leonard	MF	1988	11	1	0	0	0	0	11	1	
Jimmy Lindsay	MF	1975–1977	79	6	6	0	11	4	96	10	
Andy Llewellyn	DF	1994	4	0	1	0	1	0	6	0	
Barry Lloyd	MF	1976–1977	14	0	1	0	0	0	15	0	
Kevin Lloyd	DF	1994–1996	51	3	1	0	8	0	60	3	
Jay Lovett	DF	2003	10	1	0	0	0	0	10	1	
Gary Lowe	MF	1980–1981	9	0	0	0	2	0	11	0	
Keith Lowe	DF	2009–2010	19	1	2	0	4	0	25	1	
Steve Lowndes	MF	1990–1992	49	4	7	1	12	1	68	6	
(Northern Ireland) Matthew Lund	MF	2010–	0	0	1	0	0	0	1	0	
(England) Kenny Lunt	MF	2009–	56	1	3	0	8	0	67	1	
Neil Lyne	FW	1994–1996	63	2	5	2	12	1	80	5	
Sherjill MacDonald	FW	2008	7	6	0	0	0	0	7	6	
Chris MacKenzie	GK	1994–1997	67	1	4	0	10	0	81	1	
Neil MacKenzie	MF	2006	7	0	0	0	0	0	7	0	
Jack MacLeod	MF	2008–2009	6	0	0	0	0	0	6	0	
Paul Maddy	MF	1983; 1984–1986; 1986–1989	121	18	2	0	26	4	149	22	
Gavin Mahon	MF	1996–1998	69	4	7	0	6	0	82	4	
Ken Mallender	DF	1971–1974	72	1	1	0	6	0	79	1	
Paul Mallender	DF	1986–1988	1	0	0	0	0	0	1	0	
(England) Sam Malsom	FW	2010–	4	0	0	0	1	0	5	0	
Craig Mansell	MF	1997–1998	4	0	0	0	1	0	5	0	
(France) Mathieu Manset	FW	2009–	43	7	4	4	3	1	50	12	
Steve Mardenborough	MF	1988–1989	27	0	1	0	7	2	35	2	
Julian Marshall	DF	1976–1980	92	4	4	0	7	0	103	4	
Mark Marshall	MF	2009	8	0	0	0	2	0	10	0	
Andy Martin	FW	2002	1	0	0	0	0	0	1	0	
Dean Martin	MF	1999	1	0	0	0	0	0	1	0	
Trevor Matthewson	DF	1996–1998	62	4	3	0	2	0	67	4	
Craig Mawson	GK	2004–2006	36	0	6	0	19	0	61	0	
Leroy May	FW	1993; 1999–2000	50	7	5	1	7	2	62	10	
Jim McCafferty	MF	1975–1976	3	0	1	0	2	0	6	0	
(Canada) Gavin McCallum	FW	2009–2010	27	8	2	0	2	0	31	8	
(Australia) Trent McClenahan	DF	2006–2008	65	2	5	0	6	0	76	2	
(England) John McCombe	DF	2007–2008	27	0	4	1	1	0	32	1	
James McCue	FW	1997–1998	8	0	2	0	2	0	12	0	
Brian McGorry	MF	1997–1998	40	1	6	0	1	0	47	1	
Frank McGrellis	FW	1979–1982	85	24	5	1	15	7	105	32	
(Scotland) Michael McIndoe	MF	2000–2001	27	2	1	0	4	0	32	2	
Steve McIntyre	DF	1991–1992	12	0	2	0	2	0	16	0	
Mick McLaughlin	DF	1970–1975	84	1	5	0	5	0	94	1	
Paul McLoughlin	FW	1987–1989	74	14	1	0	16	5	91	19	
Dixie McNeil	FW	1974–1977; 1982–1983	141	88	7	2	19	7	167	97	
(Northern Ireland) James McQuilkin	MF	2009–	36	4	1	0	3	0	40	4	
Peter Mellor	GK	1977–1978	32	0	2	0	0	0	34	0	
Paul Millar	MF	1990	5	2	0	0	0	0	5	2	
(England) Lee Mills	FW	2004–2005	30	8	3	2	8	1	41	11	
Andy Milner	FW	1997	8	5	0	0	0	0	8	5	
Ian Mitchell	FW	1990–1991	3	0	0	0	3	0	6	0	
(England) Tamika Mkandawire	DF	2003–2007	126	12	14	0	26	4	166	16	
Danny Moon	MF	2003	0	0	1	0	0	0	1	0	
Ollie Morah	FW	1991	2	0	0	0	1	0	3	0	
Andrew Moran	FW	2000–2001	1	0	0	0	0	0	1	0	
Peter Morgan	DF	1974–1975	16	0	0	0	5	0	21	0	
David Morris	DF	1993–1994	40	1	0	0	9	2	49	3	
Lee Morris	FW	2009–2010	12	0	0	0	2	0	14	0	
Paul Morris	FW	1980–1981	4	1	0	0	0	0	4	1	
(England) Matt Murray	GK	2008	3	0	0	0	0	0	3	0	
Adam Musiał	DF	1980–1983	46	0	1	0	6	0	53	0	
Jordon Mutch	MF	2009	3	0	1	0	1	0	5	0	
Jennison Myrie-Williams	MF	2009	15	2	0	0	0	0	15	2	
Jon Narbett	MF	1988–1992	149	31	10	2	36	7	195	40	
Tommy Naylor	DF	1972–1975	75	4	6	1	6	0	87	5	
Gavin Nebbeling	DF	1991	3	0	1	0	0	0	4	0	
Bruno Ngotty	DF	2008	8	0	0	0	0	0	8	0	
Max Nicholson	MF	1992–1994	63	7	5	0	15	0	83	7	
(Cyprus) Nicky Nicolau	MF	2006	10	1	0	0	1	0	11	1	
David Norton	MF	1996–1998	50	0	2	0	3	1	55	1	
Colin O'Brien	MF	1978	2	0	0	0	0	0	2	0	
George Oghani	FW	1989	8	2	1	0	2	2	11	4	
Gerry O'Hara	MF	1978	1	0	0	0	0	0	1	0	
Sam Oji	DF	2008–	4	0	0	0	1	0	5	0	
Stephen O'Leary	MF	2008–2009	15	1	1	0	1	0	17	1	
Simon Osborn	MF	2006	1	0	0	0	0	0	1	0	
Gavin O'Toole	MF	1996	1	0	0	0	0	0	1	0	
Richard Overson	DF	1980–1982	11	1	1	1	5	0	17	2	
Brian Owen	FW	1970–1974	57	13	5	1	6	2	68	16	
Terry Paine	FW	1974–1977	111	8	8	0	13	3	132	11	
Chris Palmer	MF	2004	3	0	0	0	0	0	3	0	
(England) Marcus Palmer	FW	2006–2008	4	0	0	0	0	0	4	0	
(Wales) Paul Parry	MF	1997–2004	173	32	12	2	11	2	196	36	
Darren Peacock	DF	1989–1990	59	4	6	1	19	1	84	6	
Mel Pejic	DF	1980–1992	412	14	19	3	92	6	523	23	
Tony Pennock	GK	1994–1995	15	0	2	0	5	0	22	0	
Alan Peters	MF	1976–1977	1	0	0	0	0	0	1	0	
Gary Phillips	GK	1989	6	0	0	0	0	0	6	0	
(England) Stewart Phillips	FW	1977–1988; 1990–1991	330	95	15	5	56	24	401	124	
Gary Pick	MF	1994–1996	43	2	3	1	10	0	56	3	
Owen Pickard	FW	1992–1994	73	14	5	2	15	10	93	26	
Steve Piearce	FW	1999–2002	33	8	2	1	1	1	36	10	
Chris Pike	FW	1993–1994	38	18	2	1	10	3	50	22	
(England) Jamie Pitman	MF	1996–1998; 2002–2006	182	16	16	0	30	2	228	18	
Nick Plotnek	DF	2000–2001	1	0	0	0	0	0	1	0	
Gary Plumley	GK	1982	13	0	1	0	0	0	14	0	
Tristan Plummer	FW	2009	5	3	0	0	2	1	7	4	
Fred Potter	GK	1970–1974	10	0	0	0	1	0	11	0	
Tony Pounder	MF	1994–1996	62	4	6	0	11	0	79	4	
Andy Powell	GK	1982	4	0	0	0	2	0	6	0	
Cliff Powell	DF	1987–1988	7	0	0	0	0	0	7	0	
Wayne Powell	FW	1978–1979	6	2	0	0	2	0	8	2	
Brian Preece	MF	1974–1977	6	0	0	0	0	0	6	0	
Phil Preedy	MF	1994–1997	51	4	4	0	9	1	64	5	
(England) Dan Preston	DF	2010	4	0	0	0	0	0	4	0	
Chris Price	DF	1977–1986	330	26	19	1	48	4	397	31	
Marcus Priday	GK	1989–1990	3	0	0	0	1	0	4	0	
Andy Proudlove	MF	1977–1978	11	0	1	0	0	0	12	0	
Marc Pugh	MF	2009–2010	49	14	2	0	4	0	55	14	
(England) Rob Purdie	MF	2002–2007; 2010–	188	23	14	5	27	6	229	34	
Jimmy Quiggin	FW	2000–2002	36	3	3	0	8	1	47	4	
Jimmy Quinn	FW	2000	2	0	0	0	0	0	2	0	
Andrew Quy	GK	1997–2000	75	0	1	0	3	0	79	0	
(Cameroon) Amadou Rabihou	FW	2010	2	0	0	0	0	0	2	0	
(England) Ronnie Radford	MF	1971–1974	61	6	6	0	4	0	71	6	
(Republic of Ireland) Darren Randolph	GK	2008	13	0	0	0	1	0	14	0	
Eric Redrobe	FW	1972–1976	87	18	5	1	13	1	105	20	
Andy Reece	MF	1993–1995	71	5	4	0	12	3	87	3	
Jamie Reeve	FW	1995	5	0	0	0	0	0	5	0	
John Ritchie	FW	1974–1975	11	3	0	0	0	0	11	3	
Steve Ritchie	DF	1975–1978	102	3	6	0	13	2	121	5	
Brian Roberts	DF	1975	5	0	0	0	0	0	5	0	
Christian Roberts	FW	1999	9	2	0	0	0	0	9	2	
Darren Roberts	FW	1994	6	5	0	0	0	0	6	5	
Phil Roberts	DF	1978–1979	3	0	0	0	2	0	5	0	
Colin Robinson	FW	1989–1991	64	6	5	1	25	7	94	14	
Mark Robinson	DF	2004–2005	36	0	3	0	10	1	49	1	
Paul Robinson	FW	1991–1992	11	0	1	0	5	3	17	3	
Phil Robinson	MF	2000–2002	62	5	2	0	13	1	77	6	
Theo Robinson	FW	2007–2008	43	13	6	2	3	1	52	16	
Ian Rodgerson	MF	1985–1988; 1997–2002	252	16	15	1	36	2	303	19	
Lee Rogers	DF	1987	13	0	0	0	0	0	13	0	
Kevin Rose	GK	1983–1989	268	0	13	0	53	0	334	0	
Michael Rose	DF	2002–2004	79	6	4	0	7	0	90	6	
(England) Richard Rose	DF	2006–	145	3	13	1	13	0	171	4	
Ian Ross	DF	1982–1983	15	0	1	0	4	0	20	0	
Darran Rowbotham	FW	1993	8	2	0	0	0	0	8	2	
Jason Rowbotham	DF	1992–1993	5	1	1	0	2	1	8	2	
David Rudge	MF	1972–1975	82	8	5	0	9	1	96	9	
Kevin Russell	FW	1991	3	1	0	0	2	1	5	2	
David Rylands	DF	1974–1976	22	0	3	0	6	0	28	0	
(Scotland) Craig Samson	GK	2008–2009	11	0	2	0	1	0	14	0	
Bradley Sandeman	DF	1996–1997	7	0	0	0	0	0	7	0	
Robert Sawyers	MF	2002–2003	11	1	0	0	1	0	12	1	
Ben Scott	GK	2003–2005	1	0	1	0	0	0	2	0	
Jake Sedgemore	MF	2001	2	0	0	0	0	0	2	0	
Kevin Sheedy	MF	1975–1978	51	4	2	1	3	0	56	5	
Jon Sheffield	GK	1994	8	0	0	0	2	0	10	0	
Gareth Sheldon	MF	2006–2007	8	1	2	0	0	0	10	1	
John Shirley	MF	1998–2002	30	1	2	0	4	0	36	1	
Derek Showers	FW	1980–1983	89	13	6	3	19	8	114	24	
Barry Silkman	MF	1974–1976	37	2	2	0	5	1	44	3	
(England) Tim Sills	FW	2006–2007	36	2	5	0	3	0	44	2	
Colin Sinclair	FW	1976–1977	22	2	0	0	0	0	22	2	
Clive Slattery	MF	1972–1973	8	0	1	0	4	1	13	1	
Brian Smikle	MF	2005	3	0	0	0	3	1	6	1	
(England) Ben Smith	MF	2002–2004; 2007–2009	151	25	10	2	7	1	168	28	
Dean Smith	DF	1994–1997	117	19	7	0	22	7	146	26	
Kevan Smith	DF	1993–1994	24	0	2	0	6	0	32	0	
Tom Smith	DF	2004–2005	18	0	1	0	7	1	26	1	
John Snape	MF	1998–2002	142	10	10	0	15	1	167	11	
Edrissa Sonko	MF	2009–2010	10	0	1	0	2	0	13	0	
Glen Southam	MF	2009	6	0	0	0	3	0	9	0	
Peter Spiring	MF	1976–1983	227	20	11	0	23	4	261	24	
Steve Spooner	MF	1986–1988	84	19	4	1	15	2	103	22	
(England) Craig Stanley	MF	2004–2006	79	4	7	1	20	3	106	8	
(England) Adam Stansfield	FW	2004–2006	62	26	4	1	18	4	84	31	
Phil Stant	FW	1986–1989	89	38	3	2	20	10	112	50	
Phil Starbuck	MF	1990	6	0	0	0	1	0	7	0	
Tim Steele	MF	1994–1996	32	2	2	0	5	0	39	2	
Kenny Stephens	MF	1977–1980	60	2	2	0	1	0	63	2	
Gary Stevens	FW	1987–1990	94	10	4	0	21	2	119	12	
Gareth Stoker	MF	1995–1997	70	6	4	1	13	1	87	8	
(England) Dan Stratford	MF	2010–	3	0	0	0	1	0	4	0	
Steve Strong	DF	1978–1981	16	0	0	0	0	0	16	0	
Paul Sturgess	DF	1999–2001	56	0	4	0	12	0	72	0	
Colin Sullivan	DF	1981–1982	8	0	3	0	1	0	12	0	
Wayne Sutton	DF	1996	4	0	0	0	3	0	7	0	
Colin Tavener	MF	1972–1974	51	3	4	0	6	1	61	4	
Daryl Taylor	MF	2005–2006	15	0	0	0	2	0	17	0	
(England) Kris Taylor	MF	2007–2009	70	2	8	1	5	0	83	3	
Mark Taylor	MF	1998–2000	75	3	6	0	4	0	84	3	
Paul Taylor	MF	1974	1	0	0	0	1	0	2	0	
John Teasdale	FW	1983	5	1	0	0	1	0	6	1	
Richard Teesdale	DF	2002–2004	27	1	2	0	5	0	34	1	
Paul Tester	MF	1984; 1988–1991	118	14	6	1	34	2	158	17	
Andy Theodosiou	DF	1991–1993	42	2	7	0	11	1	60	3	
(England) Aidan Thomas	MF	2010–	0	0	1	0	0	0	1	0	
Brian Thomas	GK	1993–1994	3	0	0	0	2	0	5	0	
Danny Thomas	MF	2007	15	2	0	0	0	0	15	2	
Lee Thomas	DF	1989–1990	1	0	0	0	0	0	1	0	
Valmore Thomas	DF	1979–1981	32	1	2	0	3	0	37	1	
Glyn Thompson	GK	2006–2007	0	0	0	0	1	0	1	0	
(Jamaica) O'Neil Thompson	DF	2010	6	0	0	0	1	0	7	0	
Robbie Threlfall	DF	2007–2008	12	0	3	0	1	0	16	0	
David Titterton	DF	1991–1993	51	1	4	0	8	1	63	2	
Jamie Tolley	MF	2009–2010	10	0	0	0	3	0	13	0	
(England) Michael Townsend	DF	2010–	17	0	2	0	2	0	21	0	
Quentin Townsend	DF	1996–1997	7	0	0	0	3	0	10	0	
(England) Simon Travis	DF	2004–2007	94	2	6	1	26	0	126	3	
(England) Andrew Tretton	DF	2002–2005	85	3	2	0	9	0	96	3	
Billy Tucker	DF	1970–1976	137	12	7	2	16	1	160	15	
Mark Turner	DF	1997	6	0	0	0	0	0	6	0	
Dudley Tyler	MF	1969–1972; 1973–1977	102	10	10	2	11	1	123	13	
Scott Tynan	GK	2006	7	0	0	0	1	0	8	0	
Anwar Uddin	DF	2003–2004	9	2	0	0	1	0	10	2	
Ryan Valentine	DF	2009–	56	4	2	1	4	0	62	5	
Nigel Vaughan	MF	1990–1992	13	1	4	0	4	0	21	1	
Jose Veiga	GK	2009	1	0	0	0	0	0	1	0	
Scott Voice	FW	2001–2003	11	2	2	0	0	0	13	2	
Meshach Wade	MF	1991–1993	17	0	4	0	6	0	27	0	
James Walker	FW	2009	6	1	0	0	1	1	7	2	
Richard Walker	DF	1997–1998	46	3	7	0	1	2	54	5	
Shane Walker	MF	1975–1977	17	2	2	0	10	1	29	3	
James Wall	DF	1999–2001	24	1	0	0	7	0	31	1	
Kenny Wallace	MF	1972–1973	32	4	1	0	4	1	37	5	
Jon Wallis	MF	2006–2007	2	0	0	0	0	0	2	0	
Rob Warner	DF	1995–1998	63	6	5	0	4	0	72	6	
Darren Wassall	DF	1987	5	0	1	0	1	0	7	0	
Stuart Watkiss	DF	1996	19	0	0	0	2	0	21	0	
Chris Weale	GK	2007; 2008	2	0	0	0	0	0	2	0	
(England) Luke Webb	MF	2006–2008	35	3	4	2	2	0	41	5	
Paul Webb	MF	2001	13	0	0	0	0	0	13	0	
(England) Byron Webster	DF	2010–	2	0	0	0	0	0	2	0	
Nathaniel Wedderburn	MF	2009	3	0	0	0	0	0	3	0	
Tyler Weir	DF	2009–	7	0	1	0	1	0	9	0	
Ian Wells	FW	1985–1987	51	12	4	1	16	6	71	19	
(Germany) Dominik Werling	MF	2010–	6	0	1	0	1	0	8	0	
Paul Wheeler	MF	1989–1991	54	12	2	0	11	1	67	13	
(England) Steve White	FW	1994–1996	76	44	6	4	16	4	98	52	
Tom White	DF	2000	16	0	0	0	0	0	16	0	
Winston White	MF	1979–1983	175	21	10	0	23	3	208	24	
Richard Wilkins	MF	1994–1996	77	5	6	0	14	2	97	7	
(England) Andy Williams	FW	2004–2007; 2008–2009	100	19	11	0	14	4	125	23	
Brett Williams	DF	1989	14	0	1	0	3	0	18	0	
Chris Williams	FW	1993–1995	4	0	1	0	1	0	6	0	
Danny Williams	MF	2002–2005	108	17	7	0	17	2	132	19	
(Wales) Gavin Williams	MF	1997–2002	168	30	11	4	19	8	198	42	
John Williams	FW	1997	11	3	0	0	0	0	11	3	
Leroy Williams	FW	2005	5	1	0	0	1	0	6	1	
Mark Williams	DF	2001	13	1	0	0	1	0	14	1	
Robbie Williams	DF	1989–1990	5	0	0	0	4	0	9	0	
Scott Willis	MF	2004	8	2	0	0	0	0	8	2	
Rhys Wilmot	GK	1983	9	0	0	0	0	0	9	0	
George Wood	GK	1990–1991	41	0	2	0	10	0	53	0	
Trevor Wood	GK	1997	19	0	0	0	0	0	19	0	
Ian Wright	DF	1998–2003	170	22	12	2	14	4	196	28	
(England) Lewis Young	MF	2010	6	0	0	0	0	0	6	0	
