= 2010–11 Hereford United F.C. season =

Hereford United
2010–11 season
- Chairman: David Keyte
- Manager: Simon Davey (until 4 October); Jamie Pitman (from 4 October as caretaker; from 21 April as permanent manager)
- Stadium: Edgar Street
- League Two: 21st
- FA Cup: Fourth round
- League Cup: First round
- Football League Trophy: Second round (South West)
- Top goalscorer: League: Stuart Fleetwood (14); All: Stuart Fleetwood (18)
- Highest home attendance: 3,942 v Shrewsbury Town, League Two, 23 April 2011
- Lowest home attendance: 1,286 v Exeter City, Football League Trophy, 10 August 2010
- Average home league attendance: 2,516
- Biggest win: 5–0 v Stockport County (A), League Two, 30 October 2010
- Biggest defeat: 0–4 v Chesterfield (A), League Two, 21 August 2010; 0–4 v Shrewsbury Town (A), League Two, 23 November 2010; 0–4 v Southend United (A), League Two, 18 March 2011; 0–4 v Accrington Stanley (A), League Two, 30 March 2011
Home colours	Away colours

The 2010–11 season was the 90th competitive season of Hereford United Football Club, second consecutive season in League Two and 30th overall in the Football League. The club also competed in the FA Cup, FA Trophy and Football League Trophy.

The football club saw a change of ownership in the close season with David Keyte and Tim Russon purchasing the majority shareholding in the club; becoming chairman and vice-chairman respectively. After 15 years at the club as manager, chairman and director of football, Graham Turner departed along with long-serving company secretary Joan Fennessy. Turner was subsequently appointed manager of Shrewsbury Town with former backroom staff John Trewick and Tony Ford following him to the Greenhous Meadow.

From a shortlist of three, former Barnsley and Darlington manager Simon Davey was appointed as the new manager, with Andy Fensome as assistant manager. After an extended run of poor form, including 579 minutes without a goal, the pair were sacked on 5 November. Physio and former player Jamie Pitman was placed in temporary charge until the end of 2010, with Russell Hoult as assistant manager/goalkeeping coach.

Since the arrival of the new board, the club has launched a new home strip, held the first Open Day for several years, appointed new club caterers and purchased the lease of Edgar Street, resolving a long-standing issue.

== First-team squad ==
As of 7 May 2011

Note: Flags indicate national team as defined under FIFA eligibility rules; some limited exceptions apply. Players may hold more than one non-FIFA nationality.

No.	Pos.	Nation	Player
1	GK	ENG	Adam Bartlett
2	DF	WAL	Ryan Green
3	DF	WAL	Ryan Valentine
4	DF	HUN	János Kovács
5	DF	ENG	Michael Townsend (captain)
6	DF	ENG	Richard Rose
7	FW	WAL	Stuart Fleetwood
8	MF	ENG	Dan Stratford
9	FW	ENG	Waide Fairhurst (on loan from Doncaster Rovers)
10	FW	ENG	Sean Canham
14	MF	NIR	James McQuilkin

No.	Pos.	Nation	Player
16	MF	ENG	Kenny Lunt
17	MF	ENG	Joe Colbeck
18	MF	ENG	Nicky Featherstone
23	FW	WAL	Jason Price (on loan from Carlisle United)
24	DF	NED	Stefan Stam (on loan from Yeovil Town)
25	GK	ENG	Russell Hoult
26	MF	SCO	Steve Leslie (on loan from Shrewsbury Town)
30	FW	ROU	Adrian Patulea
32	MF	ENG	Rob Purdie
34	DF	ENG	Joe Heath (on loan from Exeter City)

=== Out on loan ===
Note: Flags indicate national team as defined under FIFA eligibility rules; some limited exceptions apply. Players may hold more than one non-FIFA nationality.

No.	Pos.	Nation	Player
11	FW	ENG	Sam Malsom (at Gloucester City)
15	MF	ENG	Sam Gwynne (at AFC Telford United)
19	MF	ENG	Aidan Thomas (at AFC Telford United)
21	MF	ENG	Tyler Weir (at Gloucester City)

== Pre-season ==
=== Herefordshire Senior Cup ===
Date	Round	Opponents	H / A	Result F – A	Scorers	Attendance
10 July 2010	Final	Ledbury Town	A	2–0	Sheldon, Manset	c. 700

=== Friendlies ===
Date	Opponents	H / A	Result F – A	Scorers	Attendance
13 July 2010	Swansea City	H	2–0	McQuilkin, Canham	1,568
16 July 2010	Swindon Town	H	1–4	Stratford	1,157
20 July 2010	A.F.C. Telford United	A	2–1	Manset, Thompson	753
22 July 2010	Lydbrook Athletic	A	7–0	Fleetwood (3), McQuilkin, Malsom, Thomas, Manset	c. 700
28 July 2010	Plymouth Argyle	H	0–1		1,343
31 July 2010	Neath	A	6–2	Colbeck (2), Canham (3), Fleetwood	c. 300

== League Two ==
Date	Opponents	H / A	Result F – A	Scorers	Attendance	League position
7 August 2010	Crewe Alexandra	A	1–0	Kovacs 16'	4,343	6th
14 August 2010	Gillingham	H	0–0		2,915	9th
21 August 2010	Chesterfield	A	0–4		4,970	13th
28 August 2010	Rotherham United	H	0–1		2,166	16th
4 September 2010	Burton Albion	A	0–3		2,556	20th
11 September 2010	Oxford United	H	0–2		2,980	23rd
18 September 2010	Bury	A	1–1	Bauzà 46' (pen)	2,753	23rd
25 September 2010	Southend United	H	1–3	McQuilkin 4'	2,104	24th
28 September 2010	Stevenage Borough	H	1–4	Canham 49'	1,444	24th
2 October 2010	Barnet	A	0–2		1,745	24th
9 October 2010	Port Vale	H	1–1	Canham 15'	2,651	24th
16 October 2010	Northampton Town	A	4–3	Fleetwood 59', 70', McQuilkin 72', Manset 78'	4,333	24th
23 October 2010	Accrington Stanley	H	1–1	Manset 54'	2,434	24th
30 October 2010	Stockport County	A	5–0	Purdie 9', 12', Manset 52', Fleetwood 86', Assoumani 90' (o.g.)	4,017	23rd
2 November 2010	Aldershot Town	H	2–2	Rose 25', Colbeck 45'	2,126	22nd
13 November 2010	Cheltenham Town	H	1–1	Manset 45'	3,264	23rd
20 November 2010	Lincoln City	A	1–3	Fleetwood 55'	3,888	24th
23 November 2010	Shrewsbury Town	A	0–4		6,565	24th
11 December 2010	Bradford City	A	0–1		10,460	24th
26 December 2010	Wycombe Wanderers	A	1–2	Manset 79'	3,792	24th
1 January 2011	Torquay United	H	2–2	Fleetwood 32', Manset 66'	2,373	24th
3 January 2011	Aldershot Town	A	2–1	Fleetwood 3', Colbeck 82'	2,767	23rd
15 January 2011	Stockport County	H	3–0	Halls (o.g.) 3', Manset 25', Bauzà 86'	3,154	23rd
25 January 2011	Morecambe	H	2–1	Colbeck 44', Townsend 60'	1,831	21st
1 February 2011	Torquay United	A	3–1	Fleetwood 14', 46', Featherstone 80'	1,680	20th
5 February 2011	Lincoln City	H	0–1		2,776	20th
8 February 2011	Macclesfield Town	H	2–2	Purdie 40' (pen), Fleetwood 70'	1,975	20th
12 February 2011	Cheltenham Town	A	3–0	Fairhurst 23', 89', Kovács 51'	3,643	20th
19 February 2011	Burton Albion	H	0–0		2,773	20th
22 February 2011	Northampton Town	H	1–1	Fairhurst 67'	2,125	19th
26 February 2011	Oxford United	A	2–0	Fleetwood 8', 90'	7,807	17th
5 March 2011	Bury	H	0–3		2,650	19th
8 March 2011	Stevenage	A	1–0	Colbeck 83'	1,670	18th
12 March 2011	Barnet	H	1–2	Rose 1'	2,517	20th
18 March 2011	Southend United	A	0–4		5,056	21st
22 March 2011	Port Vale	A	1–1	McQuilkin 76'	4,869	21st
27 March 2011	Crewe Alexandra	H	1–0	Fleetwood 23'	2,334	19th
30 March 2011	Accrington Stanley	A	0–4		1,632	19th
2 April 2011	Gillingham	A	0–0		5,709	19th
5 April 2011	Wycombe Wanderers	H	0–0		1,633	19th
9 April 2011	Chesterfield	H	3–0	Fleetwood 11', Leslie 76', Colbeck 81'	2,492	19th
16 April 2011	Rotherham United	A	0–0		3,770	17th
23 April 2011	Shrewsbury Town	H	0–2		3,942	20th
25 April 2011	Morecambe	A	1–1	Leslie 42'	2,016	20th
30 April 2011	Bradford City	H	1–1	Fleetwood 87'	3,219	21st
7 May 2011	Macclesfield Town	A	1–1	Green 29'	2,013	21st

== FA Cup ==
Date	Round	Opponents	H / A	Result F – A	Scorers	Attendance
6 November 2010	First Round	Hythe Town	H	5–1	Rose 8', Purdie 21', Manset 39', 44', Canham 90'	2,217
27 November 2010	Second Round	Lincoln City	H	2–2	Purdie 23', Manset 86' (pen)	1,803
8 January 2011	Second Round Replay	Lincoln City	A	4–3	Manset 4', 72' Fleetwood 36', 43'	1,794
11 January 2011	Third Round	Wycombe Wanderers	A	1–0	Manset 32'	2,353
29 January 2011	Fourth Round	Sheffield Wednesday	A	1–4	Fleetwood 9'	16,578

== League Cup ==
Date	Round	Opponents	H / A	Result F – A	Scorers	Attendance
10 August 2010	First Round	Colchester United	H	0–3		1,996

== Football League Trophy ==
Date	Round	Opponents	H / A	Result F – A	Scorers	Attendance
10 August 2010	Second Round (South)	Exeter City	H	0–3		1,286

== League data ==
=== League table ===
Pos	Team	Pld	W	D	L	GF	GA	GD	Pts	Promotion, qualification or relegation
19	Burton Albion	46	12	15	19	56	70	−14	51	
20	Morecambe	46	13	12	21	54	73	−19	51	
21	Hereford United	46	12	17	17	50	66	−16	50 (Note: Torquay United deducted one point and Hereford United deducted three points)	
22	Barnet	46	12	12	22	58	77	−19	48	
23	Lincoln City (R)	46	13	8	25	45	81	−36	47	Relegation to Conference National

Updated to match(es) played on 28 May 2011. Source: The Football League
Rules for classification: 1) points; 2) goal difference; 3) number of goals scored.
(R) Relegated

=== Results summary ===
Overall								Home						Away					
Pld	W	D	L	GF	GA	GD	Pts	W	D	L	GF	GA	GD	W	D	L	GF	GA	GD
46	12	17	17	50	66	−16	53	4	11	8	23	30	−7	8	6	9	27	36	−9

Last updated: 11 May 2011.
Source: BBC Sport

=== Results by round ===
Round	1	2	3	4	5	6	7	8	9	10	11	12	13	14	15	16	17	18	19	20	21	22	23	24	25	26	27	28	29	30	31	32	33	34	35	36	37	38	39	40	41	42	43	44	45	46
Ground	A	H	A	H	A	H	A	H	H	A	H	A	H	A	H	H	A	A	A	A	H	A	H	H	A	H	H	A	H	H	A	H	A	H	A	A	H	A	A	H	H	A	H	A	H	A
Result	W	D	L	L	L	L	D	L	L	L	D	W	D	W	D	D	L	L	L	L	D	W	W	W	W	L	D	W	D	D	W	L	W	L	L	D	W	L	D	D	W	D	L	D	D	D
Position			13	16	20	23	23	24	24	24	24	24	24	23	22	23	24	24	24	24	24	23	23	21	20	20	20	20	20	19	17	19	18	20	21	21	19	19	19	19	16	17	20	20	21	21

Updated to match(es) played on 28 May 2011. Source: Results
A = Away; H = Home; W = Win; D = Draw; L = Loss

== Squad statistics ==
No.	Pos.	Name	League		FA Cup		League Cup		FL Trophy		HFA Cup		Total		Discipline	
No.	Pos.	Name	Apps	Goals	Apps	Goals	Apps	Goals	Apps	Goals	Apps	Goals	Apps	Goals	Yellow card	Red card
1	GK	(England) Adam Bartlett	46	0	5	0	1	0	1	0	1	0	54	0		
2	DF	(Wales) Ryan Green	41	1	3	0	1	0	1	0	1	0	47	1		
3	DF	(Wales) Ryan Valentine	16	0	0	0	1	0	1	0	0	0	18	0		
4	DF	(Hungary) János Kovács	25	2	3	0	1	0	0	0	0	0	29	2		
5	DF	(England) Michael Townsend	43	1	5	0	1	0	1	0	1	0	51	1		
6	DF	(England) Richard Rose	33	2	5	1	0	0	1	0	0	0	39	3		
7	FW	(Wales) Stuart Fleetwood	43	14	5	4	1	0	0	0	1	0	49	18		
8	MF	(England) Dan Stratford	7	0	0	0	1	0	0	0	1	0	9	0		
9	FW	(France) Mathieu Manset	21	7	4	6	1	0	0	0	1	1	27	14		
9	FW	(England) Waide Fairhurst	15	3	0	0	0	0	0	0	0	0	15	3		
10	FW	(England) Sean Canham	17	2	3	0	1	0	1	0	1	0	23	2		
11	FW	(England) Sam Malsom	4	0	0	0	1	0	0	0	0	0	5	0		
12	GK	(Republic of Ireland) Dan Connor	0	0	0	0	0	0	0	0	1	0	1	0		
14	MF	(Northern Ireland) James McQuilkin	38	3	4	0	1	0	1	0	1	0	45	3		
15	MF	(England) Sam Gwynne	6	0	1	0	0	0	1	0	1	0	9	0		
16	MF	(England) Kenny Lunt	42	0	4	0	1	0	1	0	0	0	48	0		
17	MF	(England) Joe Colbeck	44	5	4	0	1	0	1	0	0	0	50	5		
18	DF	(France) Samba Kanoute	1	0	0	0	0	0	0	0	0	0	1	0		
18	MF	(England) Nicky Featherstone	27	1	5	0	0	0	0	0	0	0	32	1		
19	MF	(England) Aidan Thomas	0	0	2	0	0	0	0	0	0	0	2	0		
20	DF	(Jamaica) O'Neil Thompson	6	0	0	0	1	0	0	0	1	0	8	0		
20	FW	(England) Jake Jervis	4	0	1	0	0	0	0	0	1	0	5	0		
21	MF	(England) Tyler Weir	4	0	1	0	0	0	0	0	1	0	5	0		
22	GK	(England) Tom Whittaker	0	0	0	0	0	0	0	0	0	0	0	0		
23	MF	(Wales) Zac Evans	0	0	0	0	0	0	1	0	0	0	1	0		
23	MF	(England) Harry Pell	7	0	0	0	0	0	0	0	0	0	7	0		
23	FW	(Wales) Jason Price	4	0	0	0	0	0	0	0	0	0	4	0		
24	DF	(Netherlands) Stefan Stam	10	0	0	0	0	0	0	0	0	0	10	0		
25	GK	(England) Russell Hoult	0	0	0	0	0	0	0	0	0	0	0	0		
26	MF	(Scotland) Steven Leslie	11	2	0	0	0	0	0	0	0	0	11	2		
27	FW	(Spain) Guillem Bauzà	13	2	3	0	0	0	1	0	0	0	17	2		
28	MF	(Germany) Dominik Werling	6	0	1	0	0	0	1	0	0	0	8	0		
29	FW	(Cameroon) Amadou Rabihou	3	0	0	0	0	0	0	0	0	0	3	0		
29	DF	(England) Byron Webster	2	0	0	0	0	0	0	0	0	0	2	0		
30	DF	(Wales) Tony James	6	0	0	0	0	0	1	0	0	0	7	0		
30	FW	(Romania) Adrian Patulea	6	0	0	0	0	0	0	0	0	0	6	0		
31	GK	(England) Rhett Heister	0	0	0	0	0	0	0	0	0	0	0	0		
32	MF	(England) Rob Purdie	24	3	3	2	0	0	0	0	0	0	27	5		
33	MF	(England) Matthew Lund	2	0	1	0	0	0	0	0	0	0	3	0		
34	DF	(England) Joe Heath	26	0	4	0	0	0	0	0	0	0	30	0		
35	FW	(France) Wesley Ngo Baheng	2	0	0	0	0	0	0	0	0	0	2	0		

== Awards ==
End of Season Awards	Winner
HUISA Player of the Year	Stuart Fleetwood
HUISA Away Fans Player of the Year	Stuart Fleetwood
Website Player of the Year	Stuart Fleetwood
Junior Bulls' Player of the Year	Stuart Fleetwood
Community Trust Player of the Year	Adam Bartlett
Players' Player of the Year	Adam Bartlett
Goal of the Season	Joe Colbeck (vs Chesterfield, 9 April 2011)

== Transfers ==
Players transferred in
Date	Pos.	Name	From	Fee	Ref.
28 June 2010	DF	(Hungary) János Kovács	(England) Luton Town	Free (Bosman)	
1 July 2010	FW	(England) Sean Canham	(England) Notts County	Free	
1 July 2010	GK	(Republic of Ireland) Dan Connor	(Republic of Ireland) St Patrick's Athletic	Free	
2 July 2010	FW	(England) Stuart Fleetwood	(England) Charlton Athletic	£20,000	
15 July 2010	DF	(England) Michael Townsend	(England) Cheltenham Town	Free	
15 July 2010	FW	(England) Sam Malsom	(Sweden) Motala	Free	
16 July 2010	MF	(England) Daniel Stratford	(Scotland) Inverness Caledonian Thistle	Free	
29 July 2010	MF	(England) Joe Colbeck	(England) Oldham Athletic	Free	
6 August 2010	DF	(France) Samba Kanoute	(France) Auxerre	Free	
6 August 2010	MF	(Wales) Zac Evans	(Wales) Cardiff City	Free	
31 August 2010	FW	(Cameroon) Amadou Rabihou	Austria Lustenau	Free	
31 August 2010	DF	(Germany) Dominik Werling	(England) Darlington	Free	
16 September 2010	FW	(Spain) Guillem Bauzà	(Wales) Swansea City	Free	
15 October 2010	GK	(England) Rhett Heister	(England) Coalville Town	Free	
13 January 2011	MF	(England) Nicky Featherstone	(England) Hull City	Free	
28 January 2011	MF	(France) Wesley Ngo Baheng	(England) Aldershot Town	Free	
31 January 2011	MF	(England) Rob Purdie	(England) Oldham Athletic	Free	
7 March 2011	FW	(Romania) Adrian Pătulea	(England) Leyton Orient	Free	
Players loaned in
Date from	Pos.	Name	From	Date to	Ref.
2 July 2010	MF	(Jamaica) O'Neil Thompson	(England) Barnsley	1 November 2010	
1 October 2010	DF	(Wales) Tony James	(England) Burton Albion	2 November 2010	
29 October 2010	MF	(England) Rob Purdie	(England) Oldham Athletic	31 January 2011	
4 November 2010	FW	(England) Nicky Featherstone	(England) Hull City	13 January 2011	
19 November 2010	DF	(England) Byron Webster	(England) Doncaster Rovers	13 January 2011	
25 November 2010	DF	(England) Joe Heath	(England) Exeter City	End of season	
25 November 2010	MF	(England) Matty Lund	(England) Stoke City	27 December 2010	
21 January 2011	FW	(England) Jake Jervis	(England) Birmingham City	24 February 2011	
28 January 2011	DF	(England) Dan Preston	(England) Birmingham City	7 March 2011	
31 January 2011	MF	(England) Harry Pell	(England) Bristol Rovers	7 March 2011	
11 February 2011	FW	(England) Waide Fairhurst	(England) Doncaster Rovers	End of season	
17 March 2011	MF	(England) Steve Leslie	(England) Shrewsbury Town	End of season	
22 March 2011	DF	(Netherlands) Stefan Stam	(England) Yeovil Town	End of season	
24 March 2011	FW	(Wales) Jason Price	(England) Carlisle United	End of season	
Players loaned out
Date from	Pos.	Name	To	Date to	Ref.
23 October 2010	FW	(England) Sam Malsom	(England) Redditch United	23 November 2010	
11 February 2011	FW	(England) Sean Canham	(England) Kidderminster Harriers	27 April 2011	
12 February 2011	FW	(England) Sam Malsom	(England) Gloucester City	End of season	
Players transferred out
Date	Pos.	Name	Subsequent club	Fee	Ref.
7 June 2010	MF	(England) Marc Pugh	(England) A.F.C. Bournemouth	£60,000	
21 June 2010	FW	(Canada) Gavin McCallum	(England) Lincoln City	£6,000	
21 January 2011	FW	(France) Mathieu Manset	(England) Reading	£250,000	
Players released
Date	Pos.	Name	Subsequent club	Join date	Ref.
2 June 2010	MF	(The Gambia) Edrissa Sonko	(Cyprus) APEP	1 July 2010	
21 June 2010	DF	(Wales) Darren Jones	(England) Aldershot Town	1 July 2010 (Bosman)	
28 June 2010	DF	(England) Keith Lowe	(England) Cheltenham Town	1 July 2010	
1 July 2010	MF	(England) Matt Done	(England) Rochdale	31 July 2010	
1 July 2010	FW	(England) Leon Constantine	(England) York City	3 September 2010	
1 July 2010	MF	(England) Craig Jones	(England) Westfields	?	
1 July 2010	DF	(England) Joel Edwards	(England) Westfields	?	
1 July 2010	GK	(England) Chris Adamson	(England) Mansfield Town	? (Goalkeeper Coach)	
29 October 2010	DF	(France) Samba Kanoute	Unattached		
29 October 2010	FW	(Cameroon) Amadou Rabihou	Unattached		
21 January 2011	FW	(Spain) Guillem Bauzà	(England) Northampton Town	11 March 2011 (Bosman)	
27 January 2011	MF	(Wales) Zac Evans	(Wales) Newtown	4 March 2011	
23 February 2011	DF	(Germany) Dominik Werling	Unattached		
