= 1988–89 Nottingham Forest F.C. season =

English football club season

Nottingham Forest
1988–89 season
- Manager: Brian Clough
- Stadium: The City Ground
- First Division: 3rd
- FA Cup: Semifinals
- League Cup: Winners
- Full Member's Cup: Winners
- Top goalscorer: League: Nigel Clough (14); All: Clough (21)
Home colours	Away colours

The 1988–89 season was Nottingham Forest's 124th year in existence and 13th consecutive season in the First Division. Also the club competed in the FA Cup and League Cup.

== Summary ==
During summer Clough clinched several transfers in such as Defender Russell Bradley, midfielder Steve Hodge returned to the club after 3 seasons. Forward Lee Chapman arrived from Chamois Niortais F.C.. Also, Right-back Defender Brian Laws arrived from Middlesbrough. On April 30 the club clinched its first Full Members' Cup defeating Everton in the Final after a 4–3 score.

== Squad ==
Note: Flags indicate national team as defined under FIFA eligibility rules; some limited exceptions apply. Players may hold more than one non-FIFA nationality.

Pos.	Nation	Player
GK	ENG	Steve Sutton
GK	WAL	Mark Crossley
DF	ENG	Brian Laws
DF	NIR	Gary Fleming
DF	ENG	Steve Chettle
DF	ENG	Des Walker
DF	ENG	Brett Williams
DF	ENG	Darren Wassall
DF	ENG	Russell Bradley
DF	ENG	Sean Dyche
DF	ENG	Gary Charles
DF	ENG	Colin Foster
DF	ENG	Stuart Pearce (c)

Pos.	Nation	Player
MF	SCO	Terry Wilson
MF	ENG	Franz Carr
MF	SCO	Brian Rice
MF	ENG	Gary Crosby
MF	ENG	Steve Hodge
MF	ENG	Neil Webb
MF	ENG	Garry Parker
FW	IRL	Tommy Gaynor
FW	ENG	Phil Starbuck
FW	ENG	Nigel Clough
FW	ENG	Lee Chapman
FW	SCO	Lee Glover
FW	ENG	Alan Lamb

=== Transfers ===
In
Pos.	Name	from	Type
MF	Steve Hodge	Tottenham Hotspur	£550,000
FW	Lee Chapman	Chamois Niortais	£307,000
DF	Brian Laws	Middlesbrough	£102,000
DF	Russell Bradley	Dudley Town	
DF	Gary Charles		
DF	Sean Dyche		
FW	Alan Lamb		

Out
Pos.	Name	To	Type
DF	Gary Fleming	Manchester City	£150,000
FW	Paul Wilkinson	Watford	
GK	Hans Segers	Wimbledon	
MF	Calvin Plummer	Plymouth Argyle	
MF	Kjetil Osvold	PAOK	
FW	Nigel Jemson		
DF	Steve Locker		
MF	Gareth Price		
DF	Martin Scott		
FW	Billy Stubbs		

== Results ==
=== Division One ===
==== League table ====
Pos	Team	Pld	W	D	L	GF	GA	GD	Pts	Qualification or relegation
1	Arsenal (C)	38	22	10	6	73	36	+37	76	Disqualified from the European Cup
2	Liverpool (Note: Liverpool would have qualified as FA Cup winners.)	38	22	10	6	65	28	+37	76	Disqualified from the European Cup Winners' Cup
3	Nottingham Forest (Note: Nottingham Forest would have qualified as League Cup winners.)	38	17	13	8	64	43	+21	64	Disqualified from the UEFA Cup
4	Norwich City	38	17	11	10	48	45	+3	62	Disqualified from the UEFA Cup
5	Derby County	38	17	7	14	40	38	+2	58	

Source: World Football
Rules for classification: 1) Points; 2) Goal difference; 3) Goals scored
(C) Champions

==== Results by round ====
Round	1	2	3	4	5	6	7	8	9	10	11	12	13	14	15	16	17	18	19	20	21	22	23	24	25	26	27	28	29	30	31	32	33	34	35	36	37	38
Ground	A	H	A	H	A	H	A	A	H	A	H	A	H	A	H	A	H	A	A	H	A	H	A	H	A	H	H	A	H	A	H	H	A	H	A	H	A	H
Result	L	D	D	D	D	D	W	D	W	W	L	D	D	W	D	D	L	L	W	W	W	W	W	D	W	D	L	W	W	L	W	W	W	W	L	W	D	L
Position	14	13	14	14	14	16	11	14	9	5	9	9	9	8	10	9	9	12	10	8	6	5	4	4	5	5	5	5	5	5	4	4	4	3	4	3	3	3

Source: https://www.11v11.com/teams/nottingham-forest/tab/matches/season/1989/
A = Away; H = Home; W = Win; D = Draw; L = Loss; = Champions, Disqualified from the 1989-90 European Cup; = Disqualified from the 1989-90 UEFA Cup; = Relegated to Division Two; c = Disqualified from the 1989-90 UEFA Cup as League Cup winners.

==== Matches ====
- .- Source: https://www.11v11.com/teams/nottingham-forest/tab/matches/season/1989/

27 August 1988 1	Norwich City	2–1	Nottingham Forest	Norwich
	Fleck 13'; Bowen 40'	14	65' Chettle	Stadium: Carrow Road; Attendance: 13,488; Referee: RS Lewis

3 September 1988 2	Nottingham Forest	1–1	Sheffield Wednesday	West Bridgford
	Nigel Worthington 41' (o.g.)	13	57' Mel Sterland	Stadium: City Ground; Attendance: 18,963; Referee: KJ Breen

10 September 1988 3	Everton	1–1	Nottingham Forest	Walton
	Adrian Heath 72'	14	10' Neil Webb	Stadium: Goodison Park; Attendance: 34,006; Referee: T Mills

17 September 1988 4	Nottingham Forest	1–1	Derby County	West Bridgford
	Colin Foster 87'	14	88' Trevor Hebberd	Stadium: City Ground; Attendance: 24,818; Referee: JM Key

24 September 1988 5	Aston Villa	1–1	Nottingham Forest	Birmingham
	Kevin Gage 22'	14	80' Franz Carr	Stadium: Villa Park; Attendance: 23,029; Referee: JB Worrall

1 October 1988 6	Nottingham Forest	0–0	Luton Town	West Bridgford
		16		Stadium: City Ground

8 October 1988 7	Queens Park Rangers	1–2	Nottingham Forest	Shepherd's Bush
	Mark Stein 45'	11	31' (pen.) Nigel Clough; 89' Colin Foster	Stadium: Loftus Road; Attendance: 11,205; Referee: DJ Axcell

22 October 1988 8	Millwall	2–2	Nottingham Forest	The Den
	Sheringham 78'; Neil Ruddock 86'	14	44', 48' Steve Hodge	Stadium: New Cross; Attendance: 16,874; Referee: DA Hedges

26 October 1988 9	Nottingham Forest	2–1	Liverpool	West Bridgford
	Brian Rice 54'; Webb 59'	9	58' Ian Rush	Stadium: City Ground; Attendance: 29,755; Referee: TJ Holbrook

29 October 1988 10	Newcastle United	0–1	Nottingham Forest	Newcastle-upon-Tyne
		5	64' Lee Chapman	Stadium: St James' Park; Attendance: 24,642; Referee: DB Allison

6 November 1988 11	Nottingham Forest	1–4	Arsenal	West Bridgford
	Nigel Clough 17'	9	26'Alan Smith; 72' Steve Bould; 83'Tony Adams; 87' Brian Marwood	Stadium: City Ground; Attendance: 19,038; Referee: D Hutchinson

12 November 1988 12	West Ham United	3–3	Nottingham Forest	Upton Park
	David Kelly 2', 42'; Leroy Rosenior 57'	9	7', 21' Nigel Clough; 41' Steve Hodge	Stadium: Boleyn Ground; Attendance: 21,583; Referee: IS Hemley

19 November 1988 13	Nottingham Forest	0–0	Coventry City	West Bridgford
		9		Stadium: City Ground

26 November 1988 14	Charlton Athletic	0–1	Nottingham Forest	South Norwood
		8	Stuart Pearce 15'	Stadium: Selhurst Park; Attendance: 6,411; Referee: RM Wiseman

3 December 1988 15	Nottingham Forest	2–2	Middlesbrough	West Bridgford
	Lee Chapman 55', 56'	10	49' Mark Brennan; 85' Stuart Ripley	Stadium: City Ground; Attendance: 17,742; Referee: JW Lloyd

10 December 1988 16	Southampton	1–1	Nottingham Forest	Southampton
	Neil Maddison 37'	9	63' Nigel Clough	Stadium: The Dell; Attendance: 15,259; Referee: A Seville

18 December 1988 17	Nottingham Forest	0–1	Wimbledon	West Bridgford
		9	78' Sanchez	Stadium: City Ground; Attendance: 16,427; Referee: LR Dilkes

26 December 1988 18	Manchester United	2–0	Nottingham Forest	Manchester
	Ralph Milne 23'; Mark Hughes 52'	12		Stadium: Old Trafford; Attendance: 39,602; Referee: G Courtney

31 December 1988 19	Sheffield Wednesday	0–3	Nottingham Forest	Sheffield
		10	25'Gaynor; 27' Webb; 37' Hodge	Stadium: Hillsborough; Attendance: 20,407; Referee: MG Peck

2 January 1989 20	Nottingham Forest	2–0	Everton	West Bridgford
	Garry Parker 43'Gaynor 62'	8		Stadium: City Ground; Attendance: 26,008; Referee: AB Wilkie

15 January 1989 21	Tottenham Hotspur	2–1	Nottingham Forest	Tottenham
	Chris Waddle 45'	6	32' Garry Parker; 33' Nigel Clough	Stadium: White Hart Lane; Attendance: 16,903; Referee: N Midgley

21 January 1989 22	Nottingham Forest	4–0	Aston Villa	West Bridgford
	Steve Hodge 3'; Stuart Pearce 55'; Garry Parker 77'; Brian Laws 86'	5		Stadium: City Ground; Attendance: 22,662; Referee: B Hill

4 February 1989 23	Luton Town	2–3	Nottingham Forest	Luton
	Mick Harford 19'; Kingsley Black 45'	4	18' Garry Parker; 28' (pen.), 73' Nigel Clough	Stadium: Kenilworth Road; Attendance: 10,460; Referee: J Ashworth

11 February 1989 24	Nottingham Forest	0–0	Queens Park Rangers	West Bridgford
		4		Stadium: City Ground; Attendance: 19,690; Referee: JE Martin

11 March 1989 25	Arsenal	1–3	Nottingham Forest	Islington
	Alan Smith 14'	5	8' Nigel Clough; 20' Franz Carr; 35' Stuart Pearce	Stadium: Highbury; Attendance: 39,639; Referee: A Gunn

15 March 1989 26	Nottingham Forest	1–1	Newcastle United	West Bridgford
	Nigel Clough 34' (pen.)	5	64' Kevin Brock	Stadium: City Ground; Attendance: 20,800; Referee: K Morton

22 March 1989 27	Nottingham Forest	1–2	Tottenham Hotspur	West Bridgford
	Garry Parker 49'	5	79' David Howells; 88' Vinny Samways	Stadium: City Ground; Attendance: 23,098; Referee: KP Barratt

25 March 1989 28	Derby County	0–2	Nottingham Forest	Derby
		5	38' Steve Hodge; 86' Lee Chapman	Stadium: Baseball Ground; Attendance: 25,174; Referee: AW Ward

27 March 1989 29	Nottingham Forest	2–0	Manchester United	West Bridgford
	Stuart Pearce 4'; Lee Chapman 62'	5		Stadium: City Ground; Attendance: 30,092; Referee: D Hutchinson

1 April 1989 30	Wimbledon	4–1	Nottingham Forest	Wimbledon
	Lawrie Sanchez 10', 86'; Paul Miller 14'; John Fashanu 79'	5	31' Nigel Clough	Stadium: Plough Lane; Attendance: 7,884; Referee: JA Moules

5 April 1989 31	Nottingham Forest	2–0	Norwich City	West Bridgford
	Clough 27'; Pearce 38'	4		Stadium: City Ground; Attendance: 19,872; Referee: DS Vickers

12 April 1989 32	Nottingham Forest	3–0	Southampton	West Bridgford
	Nigel Clough 7' (pen.); Stuart Pearce 31'; Tommy Gaynor 79'	4		Stadium: City Ground; Attendance: 18,948; Referee: JC Deakin

22 April 1989 33 A	Middlesbrough	3–4	Nottingham Forest	Middlesbrough
	Stuart Ripley 20'; Bernie Slaven 82'; Peter Davenport 89'	4	23' Neil Webb; 37', 76' Lee Chapman; 74' Garry Parker	Stadium: Ayresome Park; Attendance: 20,778; Referee: VG Callow

3 May 1989 34	Nottingham Forest	4–1	Millwall	West Bridgford
	Tommy Gaynor 27'; Steve Wood 65' (o.g.); Steve Hodge 68'; Garry Parker 80'	3	58' (o.g.) Brian Laws	Stadium: City Ground; Attendance: 15,928; Referee: PW Harrison

10 May 1989 35	Liverpool	1–0	Nottingham Forest	Liverpool
	John Aldridge 81' (pen.)	4		Stadium: Anfield; Attendance: 38,484; Referee: K Cooper

13 May 1989 36	Nottingham Forest	4–0	Charlton Athletic	West Bridgford
	Franz Carr 13'; Terry Wilson 42'; Neil Webb 44'; Steve Chettle 86'	3		Stadium: City Ground; Attendance: 17,637; Referee: JE Martin

15 May 1989 37	Coventry City	2–2	Nottingham Forest	Coventry
	Howard Clark 74'; Cyrille Regis 83'	3	76' Neil Webb; 86' Nigel Clough	Stadium: Highfield Road; Attendance: 14,011; Referee: TJ Holbrook

18 May 1989 38	Nottingham Forest	1–2	West Ham United	West Bridgford
	Lee Chapman 31'	3	1', 18' Leroy Rosenior	Stadium: City Ground; Attendance: 20,843; Referee: DT Phillips

=== League Cup ===
28 September 1988 2	Nottingham Forest	6–0	Chester City	Nottingham
	Stuart Pearce 13'; Nigel Clough 21', 79'; Neil Webb 25'; Steve Hodge 77'; Tommy Gaynor 90'			Stadium: City Ground; Attendance: 11,958; Referee: DR Elleray

12 October 1988 2	Chester City	0–4 (0–10 agg.)	Nottingham Forest	Chester
			30', 46', 66' Tommy Gaynor; 57' Gary Crosby	Stadium: Sealand Road; Attendance: 4,747; Referee: WK Burge

2 November 1988 3	Nottingham Forest	3–2	Coventry City	Nottingham
	Colin Foster 39'; Steve Hodge 51'; Nigel Clough 70'		33' Gary Bannister; 40' (pen.) Brian Kilcline	Stadium: City Ground; Attendance: 21,201; Referee: RG Milford

30 November 1988 4	Leicester City	0–0	Nottingham Forest	Leicester
				Stadium: Filbert Street; Attendance: 26,704; Referee: DS Vickers

14 December 1988 replay	Nottingham Forest	2–1	Leicester City	Nottingham
	Nigel Clough 26'; Lee Chapman 59'		36' Paul Groves	Stadium: City Ground; Attendance: 26,676; Referee: F Roberts

18 January 1989 5	Nottingham Forest	5–2	Queens Park Rangers	Nottingham
	Lee Chapman 12', 27', 42', 67'; Nigel Clough 37' (pen.)		22' Mark Stein; 75' David Kerslake	Stadium: City Ground; Attendance: 24,065; Referee: GM Tyson

15 February 1989 Semifinals	Nottingham Forest	1–1	Bristol City	Nottingham
	John Pender 85' (o.g.)		65' Paul Mardon	Stadium: City Ground; Attendance: 30,060; Referee: TJ Holbrook

26 February 1989 Semifinals	Bristol City	0–1 (a.e.t.) (1–2 agg.)	Nottingham Forest	Bristol
			114' Garry Parker	Stadium: Ashton Gate; Attendance: 28,084; Referee: JB Worrall

==== Final ====
9 April 1989	Nottingham Forest	3–1	Luton Town	Wembley
	Clough 53' (pen.), 76'; Webb 68'		35' Mick Harford	Stadium: Empire Stadium; Attendance: 76,130; Referee: RG Milford

=== FA Cup ===
7 January 1989 3	Nottingham Forest	3–0	Ipswich Town	Nottingham
	Frank Yallop 3' (o.g.); Tommy Gaynor 30'; Lee Chapman 64'			Stadium: City Ground; Attendance: 20,743; Referee: LC Shapter

28 January 1989 4	Nottingham Forest	2–0	Leeds United	Nottingham
	Lee Chapman 6'; Garry Parker 90'			Stadium: City Ground; Attendance: 28,107; Referee: JB Worrall

19 February 1989 5	Watford	0–3	Nottingham Forest	Watford
	Neil Webb 39'; Lee Chapman 76'; Brian Laws 88'			Stadium: Vicarage Road; Attendance: 18,044; Referee: KS Hackett

18 March 1989 6	Manchester United	0–1	Nottingham Forest	Manchester
			Garry Parker 42'	Stadium: Old Trafford; Attendance: 55,052; Referee: B Hill

15 April 1989 Semifinal	Liverpool	abd.	Nottingham Forest	Sheffield
				Stadium: Hillsborough; Attendance: 56,000; Referee: RS Lewis
Note: The Liverpool–Nottingham Forest game was abandoned after 6 minutes due to the Hillsborough Disaster which claimed 94 lives on 15 April 1989 (the final death toll was 97).

7 May 1989 Replay	Liverpool	3–1	Nottingham Forest	Manchester
	John Aldridge 3', 58'; Brian Laws 72' (o.g.)		33' Neil Webb	Stadium: Old Trafford; Attendance: 38,000; Referee: RS Lewis
Note: There was talk that the FA Cup competition for this season would be abandoned after the Hillsborough Disaster, but on 30 April, it was confirmed that both teams would continue in the competition and play in a rescheduled semi-final on 7 May.

=== Full Members' Cup ===
10 January 1989 Eightfinals	Chelsea	1–4	Nottingham Forest	Fulham
	Kerry Dixon 58'		54'Lee Chapman; 104' Tommy Gaynor; 108'Stuart Pearce; 114' Garry Parker	Stadium: Stamford Bridge; Attendance: 8,475; Referee: PL Foakes

24 January 1989 Quarterfinals	Ipswich Town	1–3	Nottingham Forest	Ipswich
	Steve Hodge 35'		34' Jason Dozzell; 40' Stuart Pearce; 88' Gary Crosby	Stadium: Portman Road; Attendance: 16,498; Referee: DR Elleray

22 February 1989 Semifinal	Nottingham Forest	3–1	Crystal Palace	Nottingham
	Webb 14', 90'; Stuart Pearce 88'		66' Ian Wright	Stadium: City Ground; Attendance: 20,374; Referee: MG Peck

==== Final ====
30 April 1989 Final	Nottingham Forest	4–3 (a.e.t.)	Everton	Wembley
	Garry Parker 32', 67'; Lee Chapman 92', 117'		8', 101' Tony Cottee; 48' Graeme Sharp	Stadium: Empire Stadium; Attendance: 46,606; Referee: A Gunn

=== Mercentile Cr Trophy ===
29 August 1988 Quarterfinals	Liverpool	4–1	Nottingham Forest
	Barry Venison 50'; Jan Molby 70' (pen.); Ray Houghton 75'; John Barnes 84'		89' Neil Webb	Attendance: 20,141; Referee: GM Tyson

== Statistics ==
=== Squad statistics ===
No.	Pos	Nat	Player	Total		Football League Division One		FA Cup		Other	
No.	Pos	Nat	Player	Apps	Goals	Apps	Goals	Apps	Goals	Apps	Goals
	GK	(England) ENG	Steve Sutton	54	0	36	0	5	0	13	0
	DF	(England) ENG	Brian Laws	37	2	20+2	1	5	1	9+1	0
	DF	(England) ENG	Steve Chettle	38	2	23+5	2	0	0	9+1	0
	DF	(England) ENG	Des Walker	48	0	34	0	5	0	9	0
	DF	(England) ENG	Stuart Pearce	54	10	36	6	5	0	13	4
	MF	(England) ENG	Garry Parker	37	13	22	7	5	2	9+1	4
	MF	(England) ENG	Neil Webb	54	13	36	6	5	2	13	5
	MF	(Scotland) SCO	Terry Wilson	43	1	24+3	1	5	0	10+1	0
	MF	(England) ENG	Steve Hodge	53	10	33+1	7	5	0	13+1	3
	FW	(England) ENG	Lee Chapman	46	19	30	8	5	3	11	8
	FW	(England) ENG	Nigel Clough	53	21	36	14	4	0	12+1	7
	GK	(Wales) WAL	Mark Crossley	3	0	2	0	0	0	1	0
	MF	(Scotland) SCO	Brian Rice	26	1	19+1	1	0	0	6	0
	MF	(England) ENG	Franz Carr	38	3	18+5	3	4	0	8+3	0
	DF	(England) ENG	Colin Foster	23	3	17+1	2	0	0	5	1
	FW	(Republic of Ireland) IRL	Tommy Gaynor	26	10	16+3	4	2	1	5	5
	MF	(England) ENG	Gary Crosby	18	2	11+2	0	0	0	3+2	2
	FW	(England) ENG	Phil Starbuck	11	0	2+5	0	0+2	0	1+1	0
	DF	(England) ENG	Brett Williams	3	0	2	0	0	0	1	0
	DF	(England) ENG	Gary Charles	2	0	1	0	0	0	1	0
	DF	(Northern Ireland) NIR	Gary Fleming	2	0	0	0	0	0	1+1	0
	FW	(Scotland) SCO	Lee Glover	1	0	0	0	0+1	0	0	0
	DF	(England) ENG	Darren Wassall	1	0	0	0	0	0	1	0
	DF	(England) ENG	Russell Bradley	0	0	0	0	0	0	0	0
	DF	(England) ENG	Sean Dyche	0	0	0	0	0	0	0	0
	FW	(England) ENG	Alan Lamb	0	0	0	0	0	0	0	0

- Source: https://www.11v11.com/teams/nottingham-forest/tab/players/season/1989/
