= Alan Lamb =

Alan Lamb may refer to:

- Alan Lamb (footballer, born 1952), Scottish footballer
- Alan Lamb (footballer, born 1970), English footballer
- Alan Lamb (musician) (1944–2025), Australian artist, composer, and sound sculptor

== See also ==
- Allan Lamb (born 1954), English cricketer
- Allen–Lambe House, in Wichita, Kansas, US
