= János Kovács =

Hungarian footballer (born 1985)

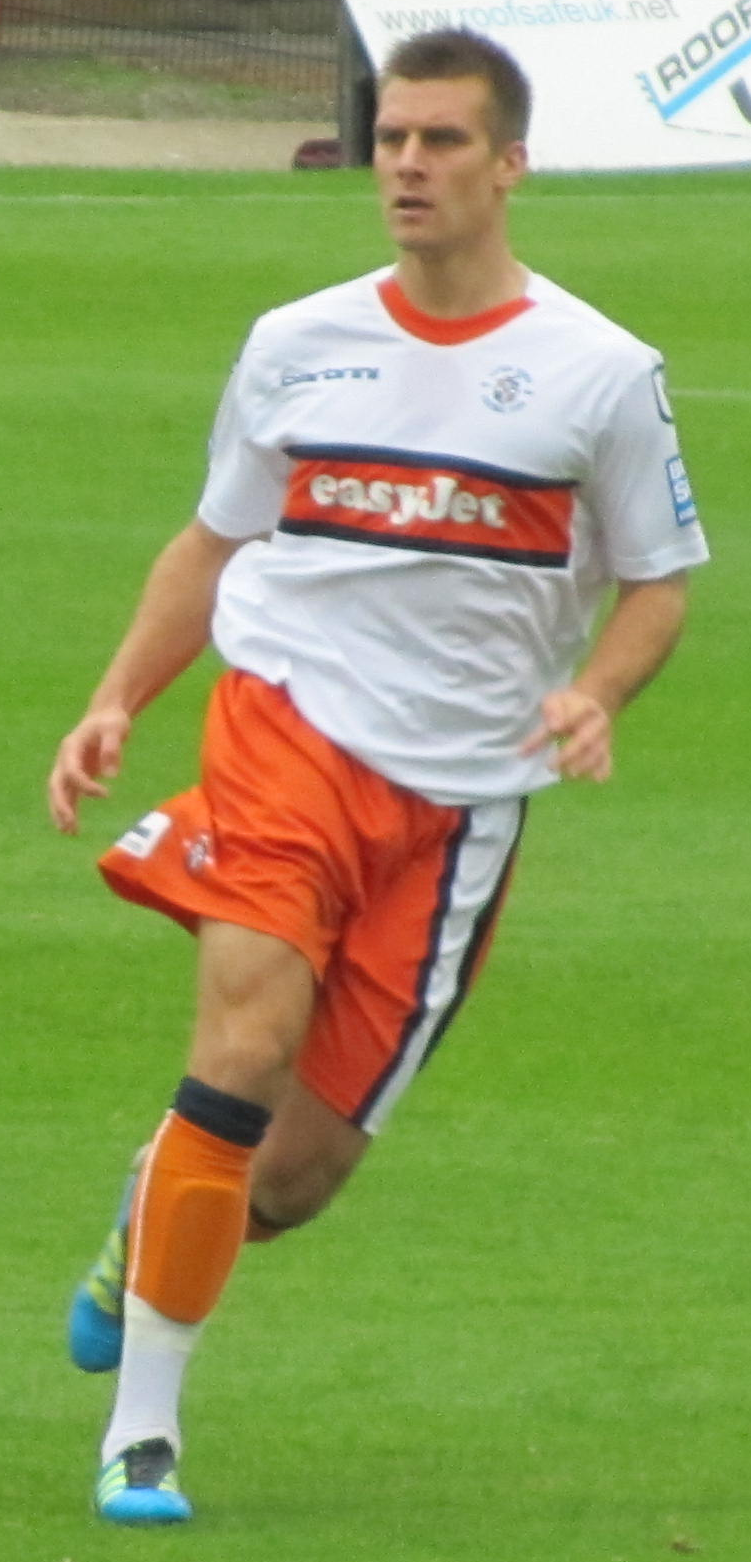
- Kovács in 2011

Personal information
- Full name: János Kovács
- Date of birth: 11 September 1985 (age 41)
- Place of birth: Budapest, Hungary
- Height: 6 ft 4 in (1.93 m)
- Position: Defender

Team information
- Current team: Pénzügyőr
- Number: 20

Youth career
- ?–2003: MTK

Senior career*
Years	Team	Apps	(Gls)
2003–2005	MTK	1	(0)
2004–2005	→ Bodajk (loan)		
2005–2008	Chesterfield	57	(2)
2007	→ York City (loan)	8	(1)
2008–2010	Lincoln City	59	(4)
2010	Luton Town	17	(1)
2010–2012	Hereford United	25	(2)
2011–2012	→ Luton Town (loan)	17	(2)
2012–2013	Luton Town	40	(5)
2013–2014	Budapest Honvéd	0	(0)
2014–2015	BFC Siófok	9	(2)
2015–2017	SZTK	22	(3)
2017–	Pénzügyőr	11	(5)

International career
- Hungary U19
- * Club domestic league appearances and goals as of 23 October 2018

János Kovács (born 11 September 1985) is a Hungarian footballer who plays for Pénzügyőr SE as a defender. He has played for MTK, Bodajk, Chesterfield, York City, Lincoln City, Luton Town and Hereford United.

== Club career ==
=== MTK ===
Born in Budapest, Kovács started his career with the youth system of hometown club MTK. He made his first team debut towards the end of the 2003–04 season, playing in a 2–1 defeat against Ferencváros in the Nemzeti Bajnokság I. He spent the 2004–05 season on loan with Bodajk, the reserve team of MTK, and played regularly for them in the Nemzeti Bajnokság II.

=== Chesterfield ===
Kovács joined English League One club Chesterfield on a two-year contract on 3 August 2005 following a trial with the club, with international clearance being received a week later on 11 August. He was sent-off in Chesterfield's game against Southend United on 18 February 2006, which the club unsuccessfully appealed when it was rejected by The Football Association, who issued Kovács a one-match suspension.

Kovács joined York City in the Conference National on a one-month loan on 2 March 2007 and made his debut in a 0–0 home draw with Forest Green Rovers the following day. He scored in a 5–0 victory at Cambridge United and finished his spell with the club with eight appearances and one goal. His loan was not extended and so returned to Chesterfield after the completion of the spell, after which he made three appearances for the club as they were relegated to League Two. Kovács was offered a new one-year contract with Chesterfield at the end of the 2006–07 season, which he signed in May. He finished the 2007–08 season with 43 appearances 2 goals for Chesterfield and was runner-up in the club's CFSS player of year award.

=== Lincoln City ===
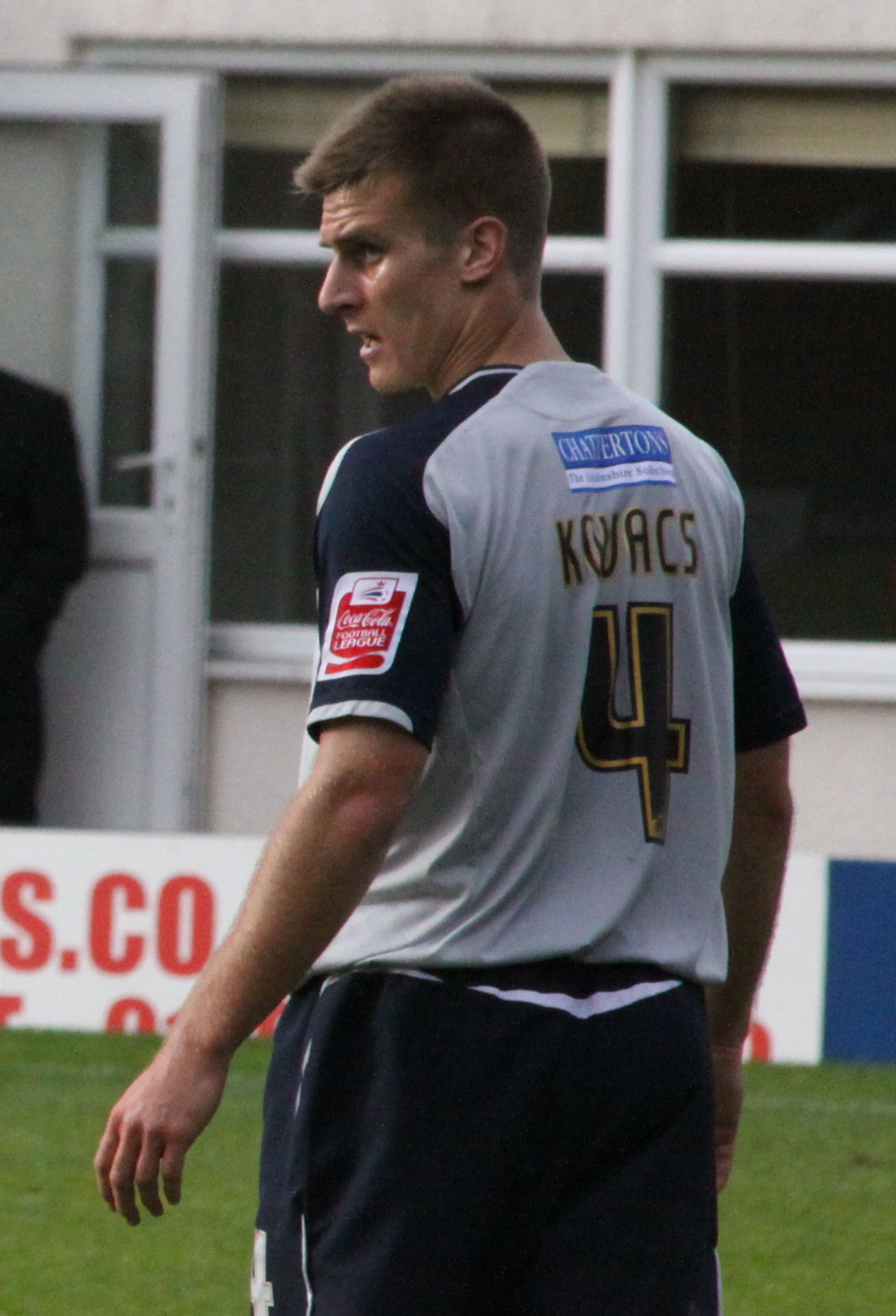
Kovács playing for Lincoln City in 2009

He was offered a new contract by Chestfield at the end of the season, but the likelihood of him signing decreased after the club signed Swansea City defender Kevin Austin. Lincoln City were revealed to be his likely destination by Chesterfield manager Lee Richardson, with a fee to be settled by a tribunal. Lincoln completed the signing on a two-year contract on 25 June 2008. A Football League tribunal ordered Lincoln to pay a compensation fee of £17,500 for Kovács in August, and Chesterfield would also receive 20% of a sell-on fee. He made 66 appearances for Lincoln, scoring four goals, before being placed on the transfer list in January 2010.

=== Luton Town ===
On 26 January 2010, Kovács' contract with Lincoln was cancelled by mutual consent, and he subsequently signed for Conference Premier side Luton Town on a five-month contract. Luton fought off competition from English clubs Southend United and Barnet, as well as Hungarian side Ferencváros – the country's most successful club – to secure Kovács' signature. He made his debut in a 2–0 win at Histon on 27 January 2010, scoring the opening goal with a diving header from a Kevin Nicholls corner kick. Kovács made 17 appearances during his time at Luton.

=== Hereford United ===
His Luton contract expired in June 2010 and he signed a two-year contract with League Two side Hereford United on a free transfer later in the month. He made his Hereford debut in a 1–0 away win at Crewe Alexandra in which he scored his first goal for the club with a header from a James McQuilkin corner kick. He finished the season with 2 goals in 25 appearances for Hereford.

=== Return to Luton Town ===
After being transfer listed at the start of the 2011–12 season, Kovács joined former club Luton Town on an emergency one-month loan on 19 September 2011 during a period when the majority of the Luton defence had picked up injuries or suspensions. This loan was then extended until 1 January 2012. He was released by Hereford on 2 January 2012, signing permanently for Luton on a one-and-a-half-year contract. On Kovács signing a permanent contract Luton manager Gary Brabin said "János has been a rock at the back for us since joining us again. His performances have been fantastic and he has had an unbelievably positive effect on the team on and off the pitch." He made 44 appearances and scored 4 goals over the season for Luton, and won the Player of the Year Award for his performances. Kovács was also named in the 2011–12 Conference Premier Team of the Year alongside Luton teammate Mark Tyler. Manager John Still confirmed Kovács would be released at the end of the 2012–13 season, in which the player made 30 appearances and scored three goals.

== International career ==
Kovács was capped by Hungary at under-19 level.

== Career statistics ==
As of match played 2 March 2013.

Club	Season	League			National Cup		League Cup		Other		Total	
Club	Season	Division	Apps	Goals	Apps	Goals	Apps	Goals	Apps	Goals	Apps	Goals
MTK	2003–04	Nemzeti Bajnokság I	1	0	0	0	—		—		1	0
MTK	2004–05	Nemzeti Bajnokság I	0	0	0	0	—		—		0	0
MTK	Total		1	0	0	0	—		—		1	0
Chesterfield	2005–06	League One	9	0	0	0	1	0	0	0	10	0
Chesterfield	2006–07	League One	7	0	1	0	0	0	1 (Note: Appearance in Football League Trophy)	0	9	0
Chesterfield	2007–08	League Two	41	2	0	0	1	0	1	0	43	2
Chesterfield	Total		57	2	1	0	2	0	2	0	62	2
York City (loan)	2006–07	Conference National	8	1	0	0	—		0	0	8	1
Lincoln City	2008–09	League Two	45	3	2	0	1	0	1	0	49	3
Lincoln City	2009–10	League Two	14	1	2	0	1	0	0	0	17	1
Lincoln City	Total		59	4	4	0	2	0	1	0	66	4
Luton Town	2009–10	Conference Premier	17	1	0	0	—		0	0	17	1
Hereford United	2010–11	League Two	25	2	3	0	1	0	0	0	29	2
Hereford United	2011–12	League Two	0	0	0	0	0	0	0	0	0	0
Hereford United	Total		25	2	3	0	1	0	0	0	29	2
Luton Town (loan)	2011–12	Conference Premier	17	2	2	0	—		0	0	19	2
Luton Town	2011–12	Conference Premier	20	2	0	0	—		5 (Note: 2 appearances in FA Trophy, 3 in Conference Premier play-offs)	0	25	2
Luton Town	2012–13	Conference Premier	20	3	7	0	—		3 (Note: Appearance in FA Trophy)	0	30	3
Luton Town	Total		57	7	9	0	—		8	0	74	7
Career total			224	17	17	0	5	0	11	0	257	17

== Honours ==
Individual

- Conference Premier Team of the Year: 2011–12
