= Waide Fairhurst =

English footballer (born 1989)

Personal information
- Full name: Waide Simon Fairhurst
- Date of birth: 7 May 1989 (age 37)
- Place of birth: Sheffield, England
- Position: Forward

Senior career*
Years	Team	Apps	(Gls)
2008–2011	Doncaster Rovers	11	(2)
2009	→ Solihull Moors (loan)	5	(2)
2009–2010	→ Shrewsbury Town (loan)	10	(4)
2010	→ Southend United (loan)	3	(0)
2011	→ Hereford United (loan)	16	(3)
2011–2013	Macclesfield Town	58	(13)
2013–2014	Lincoln City	12	(2)
2014	→ Macclesfield Town (loan)	2	(0)
2014	Whitehawk	14	(4)
2014–2015	Macclesfield Town	42	(10)
2015–2016	Torquay United	3	(0)
2016	FC Halifax Town	8	(0)
2016–2017	Boston United	14	(1)
2017	Frickley Athletic	14	(3)
2018	Brighouse Town	8	(2)
2018	Sheffield		
2018–2019	Handsworth	22	(10)
2019	Maltby Main	4	(1)
2019	Handsworth	2	(0)
2019–2020	Barton Town		
- * Club domestic league appearances and goals as of 21:47, 5 March 2020 (UTC)

Waide Simon Fairhurst (born 7 May 1989) is an English professional footballer who most recently played for Barton Town. He previously played in the Football League with Doncaster Rovers, Shrewsbury Town, Southend United, Hereford United and Macclesfield Town.

== Playing career ==
Fairhurst made his debut for Doncaster Rovers in a 1–0 loss against Coventry City in March 2009, coming on as substitute for Mark Wilson in the 84th minute. He made his home debut one month later in the 2–0 win against Crystal Palace, replacing Kazenga LuaLua with half an hour to go and setting up James Hayter for the second goal. In the 2009–10 season, Fairhurst made his first start for the club against West Bromwich Albion and managed to score seven minutes into the game. His second start came against Ipswich Town, during which he once again opened the scoring.

In October 2009, Fairhurst signed for Shrewsbury Town on a one-month loan deal. He equalised for Shrewsbury Town on his debut against Aldershot. He scored again to help Shrewsbury Town beat Telford United 2–1 and regain the Shropshire Senior Cup. Later his loan deal was extended until early January 2010. Fairhurst scored his fourth league goal for the Shrews during the home match against Macclesfield Town on Boxing Day, but picked up a foot injury in the same match. With this expected to keep him sidelined for three weeks, Shrewsbury decided not to extend the loan deal further.

On 6 October 2010, Fairhurst joined Southend United on a one-month loan deal. On 10 February 2011 he joined Hereford United on an initial months loan, scoring twice on his debut against Cheltenham Town.

On 19 July 2011, it was confirmed that Fairhurst had signed a two-year contract with Macclesfield Town.

Fairhurst signed on a free transfer for Lincoln City on 17 May 2013.

On 31 January 2014, Fairhurst rejoined Macclesfield Town on a one-month loan deal, having only left the club six months earlier. After being released by Lincoln in March, he finished the season with Whitehawk in the Conference South. He rejoined Macclesfield on a permanent deal in the summer, finishing the 2014–15 season as the club's leading goalscorer with 13 goals in all competitions.

In January 2016 he left Torquay United citing personal reasons.

He signed for FC Halifax Town on 6 February 2016.

He joined Boston United in June 2016, where he scored once in 14 league appearances.

In January 2017 he joined Frickley Athletic.

In January 2018 he joined Brighouse Town FC. In March 2018, he moved on to join Sheffield FC. Fairhurst was on the move again in November 2018 when he joined Handsworth FC, scoring 11 goals in 24 games (10 goals in 22 games in the league). He then had a short spell at Maltby Main, before returning to Handsworth on 21 September 2019. One month later, Fairhurst left Handsworth having played three games in all competitions without scoring. He joined Barton Town, scoring five goals in 17 appearances in all competitions.

== Career statistics ==
Appearances and goals by club, season and competition
Club	Season	League			FA Cup		League Cup		Other		Total	
Club	Season	Division	Apps	Goals	Apps	Goals	Apps	Goals	Apps	Goals	Apps	Goals
Doncaster Rovers	2008–09	Championship	3	0	0	0	0	0	—		3	0
Doncaster Rovers	2009–10	Championship	6	2	0	0	1	0	—		7	2
Doncaster Rovers	2010–11	Championship	2	0	0	0	1	0	—		3	0
Doncaster Rovers	Total		11	2	0	0	2	0	—		13	2
Solihull Moors (loan)	2008–09	Conference North	5	2	0	0	—		0	0	5	2
Shrewsbury Town (loan)	2009–10	League Two	10	4	0	0	0	0	0	0	10	4
Southend United (loan)	2010–11	League Two	3	0	0	0	0	0	0	0	3	0
Hereford United (loan)	2010–11	League Two	16	3	0	0	0	0	0	0	16	3
Macclesfield Town	2011–12	League Two	18	0	2	0	0	0	0	0	20	0
Macclesfield Town	2012–13	Conference Premier	40	13	4	0	—		2 (Note: One appearance in FA Trophy; one appearance one goal in Cheshire Senior Cup)	1	46	14
Macclesfield Town	Total		58	13	6	0	0	0	2	1	66	14
Lincoln City	2013–14	Conference Premier	12	2	1	0	—		1 (Note: Appearance(s) in FA Trophy)	0	14	2
Macclesfield Town (loan)	2013–14	Conference Premier	2	0	0	0	—		0	0	2	0
Whitehawk	2013–14	Conference South	14	4	0	0	—		0	0	14	4
Macclesfield Town	2014–15	Conference Premier	42	10	2	1	—		4 (Note: One appearance in FA Trophy; three appearances two goals in Cheshire Senior Cup)	2	48	13
Torquay United	2015–16	National League	3	0	0	0	—		0	0	3	0
FC Halifax Town	2015–16	National League	8	0	0	0	—		2	1	10	1
Boston United	2016–17	National League North	14	1	2	0	—		2 (Note: One appearance in FA Trophy; one appearance in Lincolnshire Senior Cup)	0	18	1
Frickley Athletic	2016–17	Northern Premier League Premier Division	14	3	0	0	—		2 (Note: Appearance(s) in Sheffield & Hallamshire Senior Cup)	2	16	5
Brighouse Town	2017–18	Northern Premier League Division One North	8	2	0	0	—		0	0	8	2
Sheffield	2017–18	Northern Premier League Division One South	12	7	0	0	—		0	0	12	7
Career total			232	53	11	1	2	0	13	6	258	60
