= Samba Kanoute =

French footballer (born 1991)

Personal information
- Date of birth: 30 July 1991 (age 35)
- Place of birth: France
- Height: 6 ft 1 in (1.85 m)
- Position: Defender

Senior career*
Years	Team	Apps	(Gls)
2010	Hereford United	1	(0)
- * Club domestic league appearances and goals as of 00:00, 17 September 2010 (UTC)

Samba Kanoute (born 30 July 1991) is a French footballer who plays as a defender but is without a club after being released by Hereford United of League Two.

== Playing career ==
Kanoute signed with League Two club Hereford United, after impressing on trial. He made his debut on 11 September 2010, in a 2-0 defeat by Oxford United at Edgar Street, replacing O'Neil Thompson on 68 minutes.
