= James McCue =

Scottish footballer

Personal information
- Full name: James Gerard McCue
- Date of birth: 29 June 1975 (age 51)
- Place of birth: Glasgow, Scotland
- Position: Forward

Senior career*
| Years | Team | Apps | (Gls) |
| 1992–1996 | West Bromwich Albion | 2 | (1) |
| 1996 | Partick Thistle | 3 | (0) |
| 1996–1997 | Kidderminster Harriers | 24 | (1) |
| 1997–1998 | Hereford United | 8 | (0) |
| Total | | 37 | (2) |
- * Club domestic league appearances and goals

James McCue (born 29 June 1975 in Glasgow) is a Scottish former footballer who played in the English and Scottish Football League as a forward.
