= Dan Preston =

English footballer (born 1991)

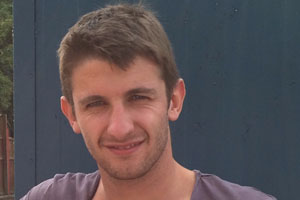
- Preston in 2014

Personal information
- Full name: Daniel Sean Preston
- Date of birth: 26 September 1991 (age 35)
- Place of birth: Birmingham, England
- Height: 5 ft 11 in (1.80 m)
- Position: Defender

Youth career
- 2002–2009: Birmingham City

Senior career*
Years	Team	Apps	(Gls)
2009–2011	Birmingham City	0	(0)
2010	→ Hereford United (loan)	4	(0)
2011	→ Hereford United (loan)	0	(0)
2011–2014	AFC Telford United	70	(2)
2013	→ Barrow (loan)	3	(0)
2013	→ Stourbridge (loan)		
2014–2016	Tamworth	59	(3)
2016–2017	AFC Telford United	7	(0)
2016–2017	→ Leamington (loan)	5	(0)
2017	→ Hednesford Town (loan)		
2017	→ Stourbridge (loan)	8	(2)
2017–2018	Hereford		
2017	→ Bromsgrove Sporting (dual)	8	(1)
2018–2019	Stratford Town	8	(0)
2019	Sutton Coldfield Town		
2019	Nuneaton Borough	1	(0)
2019	Sutton Coldfield Town	0	(0)
2019–2020	Bedworth United	15	(0)
2020–2021	Hednesford Town		
2021–2022	Bedworth United		
- * Club domestic league appearances and goals as of 16:00, 26 January 2020 (UTC)

Daniel Sean Preston (born 26 September 1991) is an English retired footballer who played as a defender.

== Playing career ==
=== Birmingham City ===
Preston joined Birmingham City's youth academy in 2002. He played in the club's under-18 team which reached the semi-final of the 2008–09 FA Youth Cup, in which they lost 6–1 on aggregate to their Liverpool counterparts.

Included in the squads for first-team pre-season friendlies, Preston injured a medial knee ligament playing for a reserve XI against Tamworth. Following an injury crisis, Preston, still in the second year of his academy scholarship, was given a squad number and made his first-team debut on 22 September 2009 as a second-half substitute in the League Cup third-round match at Sunderland, replacing the injured Stuart Parnaby in the 79th minute; he received a yellow card in stoppage time.

=== Hereford United (loan) ===
To gain first-team experience, Preston joined League Two club Hereford United on a one-month loan on 26 February 2010. He went straight into the starting eleven for the following day's visit to Notts County, which ended in a 5–0 defeat as goalkeeper Chris Adamson and defender Paul Downing were sent off and Preston himself was booked. After three more League Two appearances, the loan was extended for a second month. Preston returned to Birmingham at the end of his second month without making any more first-team appearances for Hereford.

He rejoined Hereford on a Football League youth loan – an arrangement which allows the player to train with and play non-first-team matches for his parent club when not required by the loaning club – in January 2011 until the end of the 2010–11 season. He failed to make a first-team appearance and the loan was ended on 12 April. He was released when his contract expired at the end of the 2010–11 season.

=== AFC Telford United ===
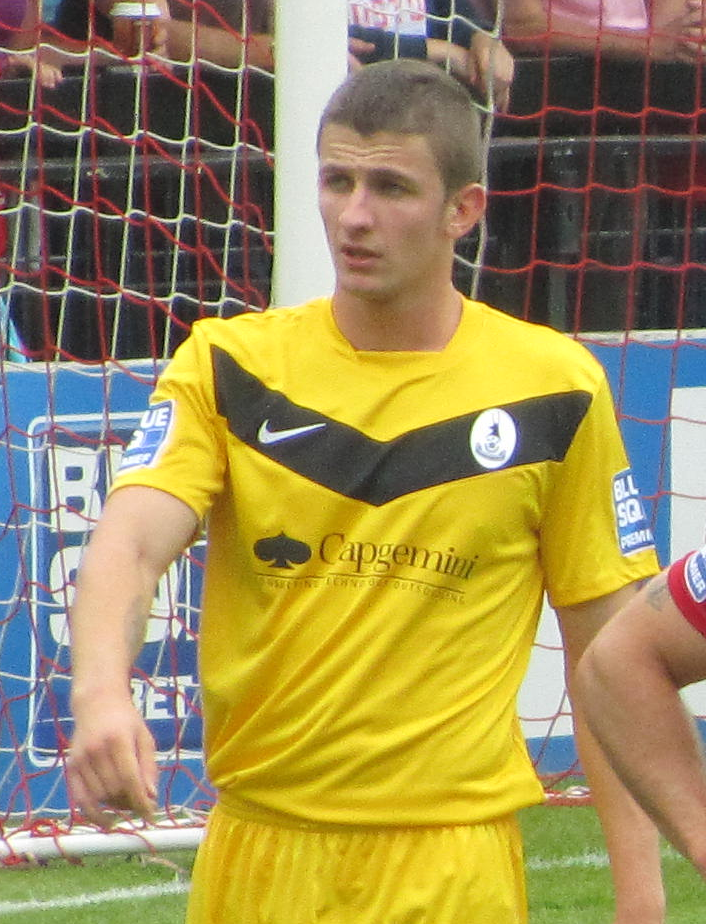
Preston playing for AFC Telford United in 2011

Preston joined Conference Premier club AFC Telford United on 20 July 2011. After a successful first season with the club he was given a new one-year deal. It was announced on 3 May 2013 at the club's end of season awards that Preston would extend his contract with AFC Telford, despite the club being relegated to the Conference North.

Preston joined Conference North rivals Barrow on a one-month loan on 18 October 2013, with whom he made five appearances. He was soon loaned out again, joining Stourbridge of the Southern League Premier Division on 28 November. Preston made his debut for Stourbridge two days later in a 7–0 home victory over Weymouth. On 26 April 2014, he won promotion back to the Conference Premier with AFC Telford United at the first time of asking, after they clinched the Conference North title on the final day of the 2013–14 season, beating Gainsborough Trinity 3–0 at the New Bucks Head. Following their promotion, AFC Telford released Preston after three seasons with the club.

=== Tamworth ===
Preston signed for newly relegated Conference North team Tamworth on a one-year contract on 9 June 2014.

=== AFC Telford United ===
Preston returned to Telford in May 2016.

=== Leamington (loan) ===
On 6 December 2016, Dan joined Leamington on loan.

=== Hednesford Town (loan) ===
On 13 January 2017, Preston was again loaned out, this time to Hednesford Town.

=== Stourbridge (loan) ===
Preston signed for Stourbridge on loan from AFC Telford United on 24 February 2017.

=== Hereford ===
It was confirmed on 26 August 2017, that Preston had signed for Hereford.

=== Bromsgrove Sporting (dual registration) ===
Preston was confirmed as signing on dual registration for Bromsgrove Sporting on 12 January 2018, in a bid to help the player get some game time, and help him return to fitness.

=== Stratford Town ===
On 20 December 2018, Dan Preston signed for Southern League Premier Central side Stratford Town, and was joined on the same day by goalkeeper Matija Sarkic, who joined the club on loan from Aston Villa.

Preston made his debut for Stratford Town on 2 February 2019, in a home match against St Ives Town, the match finished 0–0.

=== Sutton Coldfield Town ===
On 16 March 2019, it was confirmed that Preston had signed for Southern League Division One Central side Sutton Coldfield Town.

=== Nuneaton Borough ===
On 27 June 2019, Dan signed for newly relegated Southern League Premier Central side Nuneaton Borough. With just one substitute appearance to his name, Preston left Nuneaton Borough on 30 August 2019.

=== Sutton Coldfield Town ===
On the same day, Preston resigned for Southern League Division One Central side Sutton Coldfield Town.

=== Bedworth United ===
Preston's move to Sutton Coldfield Town was short lived, as on 12 September 2019, he was announced as part of a double signing for Southern League Division One Central side Bedworth United along with Blaize Punter.

== Personal life ==
Preston was born in Birmingham, West Midlands, and brought up in the Kings Norton district of the city, where he attended St Thomas Aquinas School. In his final year, he helped the school football team to victory in the final of the 2008 Birmingham City Cup. His stepbrothers James and Mitchell McPike both turned professional with Birmingham City – Mitchell also played for England at under-17 level – but neither played for the first team.

== Career statistics ==
As of match played 15 October 2016

Club statistics
Club	Season	League			FA Cup		League Cup		Other		Total	
Club	Season	Division	Apps	Goals	Apps	Goals	Apps	Goals	Apps	Goals	Apps	Goals
Birmingham City	2009–10	Premier League	0	0	0	0	1	0	—		1	0
Hereford United (loan)	2009–10	League Two	4	0	—		—		—		4	0
Hereford United (loan)	2010–11	League Two	0	0	0	0	—		—		0	0
Hereford United (loan)	Total		4	0	—		—		—		4	0
AFC Telford United	2011–12	Conference Premier	28	1	2	0	—		2 (Note: Appearances in FA Trophy)	0	32	1
AFC Telford United	2012–13	Conference Premier	24	0	1	0	—		2	0	27	0
AFC Telford United	2013–14	Conference North	18	1	0	0	—		0	0	18	1
AFC Telford United	Total		70	2	3	0	—		4	0	77	2
Barrow (loan)	2013–14	Conference North	3	0	2	0	—		0	0	5	0
Tamworth	2014–15	Conference North	24	1	2	0	—		0	0	26	1
Tamworth	2015–16	Conference North	36	2	0	0	—		1	0	37	2
Tamworth	Total		60	3	2	0	—		1	0	63	3
AFC Telford United	2016–17	Conference North	7	0	0	0	—		0	0	7	0
Career total			144	5	7	0	1	0	5	0	157	3

== Honours ==
AFC Telford United

- Conference North: 2013–14
