= Tyler Weir =

English footballer (born 1990)

Personal information
- Full name: Tyler Carlton Weir
- Date of birth: 21 December 1990 (age 35)
- Place of birth: Hereford, England
- Height: 1.78 m (5 ft 10 in)
- Position: Midfielder

Team information
- Current team: Evesham United

Youth career
- 2007–2009: Hereford United

Senior career*
Years	Team	Apps	(Gls)
2009–2012	Hereford United	7	(0)
2011	→ Gloucester City (loan)	16	(1)
2011–2012	→ Gloucester City (loan)	24	(2)
2012	→ Worcester City (loan)	18	(0)
2012–2013	Worcester City	36	(1)
2013	Gloucester City	20	(2)
2013–2017	Worcester City	122	(6)
2017	Hednesford Town		
2017–2018	Worcester City		
2018–2019	Gloucester City	6	(0)
2019	Halesowen Town		
2019–2020	Evesham United	0	(0)
- * Club domestic league appearances and goals as of 19:52, 7 November 2019 (UTC)

Tyler Carlton Weir (born 21 December 1990) is an English professional footballer who plays for Newent Town AFC in the Hellenic Division 1

== Career ==
Born in Hereford, Herefordshire, he signed a deal with his hometown club Hereford United in Football League Two at the beginning of May 2009. He made his debut for the club in a home defeat to Milton Keynes Dons in the southern section semi-final of the Football League Trophy. On 28 February 2011 he signed for Gloucester City on loan for a month where he scored his first senior goal against Stafford Rangers. After an impressive first month the loan was extended to cover the rest of the season. His form with the Tigers earned him a new one-year contract with the Bulls to keep him at the club for the 2011/2012 season. He re-joined Gloucester City on a months loan in August 2011 in order to provide cover for injuries within the Tigers squad, this was later extended until January where he then joined league rivals Worcester City until the end of the season.

In February 2016, Weir was handed a six-month suspension by The Football Association, of which four-months where suspended until 1 July 2018, for failing to immediately report an "approach by a third party related to seeking to influence the outcome or conduct of a match or competition". The FA also stated, "the three players were not involved in any attempt to fix matches and did not accept monies or gifts".

In the summer 2019, Weir joined Evesham United, but soon left and has been with Newent Town since then.
