= Amadou Rabihou =

Cameroonian footballer

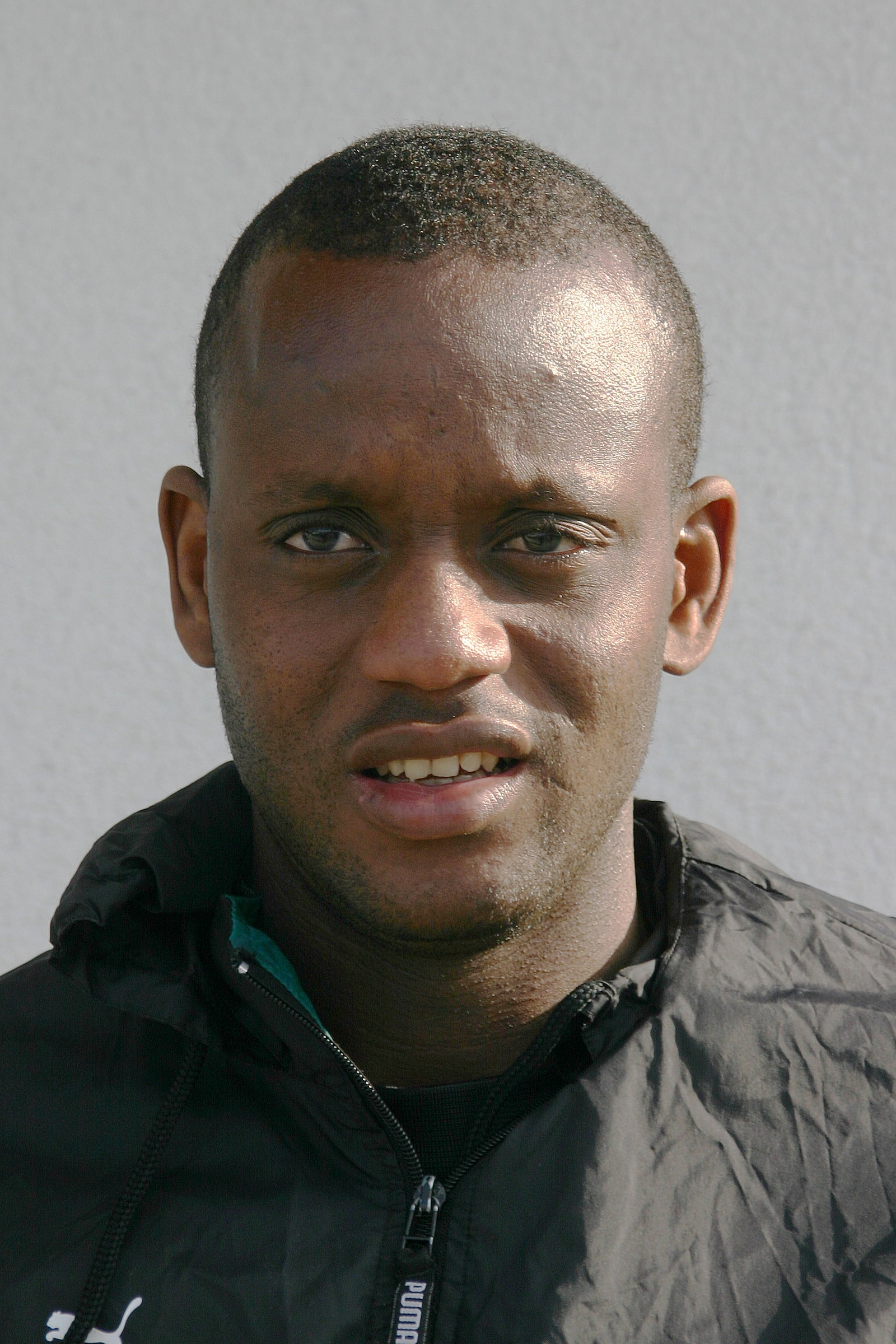
- Amadou Rabihou

Personal information
- Full name: Amadou Dangadji Rabihou
- Date of birth: 2 December 1984 (age 41)
- Place of birth: Douala, Cameroon
- Height: 1.85 m (6 ft 1 in)
- Position: Forward

Youth career
- –2002: Milan

Senior career*
Years	Team	Apps	(Gls)
2002–2007	Sturm Graz	65	(12)
2007–2008	Amiens SC	7	(1)
2008	DAC Dunajská Streda	3	(0)
2009	Austria Lustenau	26	(10)
2010	Hereford United	3	(0)
2011–2012	Waldhof Mannheim	31	(4)
2012–2013	Al Urooba		(3)
2013	Al Rams		
2015	Acri		
2015–2016	FCM Traiskirchen		
2016	ASK Elektra		
- * Club domestic league appearances and goals

Amadou Dangadji Rabihou (born 2 December 1984) is a Cameroonian former professional footballer who played as a forward.

== Career ==
Rabihou was born in Douala, Cameroon. He began his career in the youth set up at AC Milan. In 2002 he moved to Austrian side SK Sturm Graz, playing 65 times and scoring 12 goals. After five years he left the Puntigamer Sturm and moved to French second league team Amiens SC. Unable to force his way into the first team he left, he joined the Slovak team FK DAC 1904 Dunajská Streda. Once more disgruntled at a lack of game time, Rabihou left the club in January 2009, returning to Austria by signing for Austria Lustenau. In August 2010 he signed a short-term deal with English side Hereford United making his debut on 4 September in a 3–0 away defeat to Burton Albion.
