= Dominik Werling =

German footballer

Personal information
- Full name: Dominik Patrick Werling
- Date of birth: 13 December 1982 (age 43)
- Place of birth: Ludwigshafen, West Germany
- Positions: Left-back; left winger

Team information
- Current team: FK Nevezis

Senior career*
Years	Team	Apps	(Gls)
2003–2004	Arminia Bielefeld II	20	(0)
2004–2005	Union Berlin	9	(0)
2005–2006	TSV Crailsheim	16	(2)
2006–2007	SpVgg Bayern Hof	8	(0)
2006–2007	Sakaryaspor	0	(0)
2007–2008	Barnsley	17	(1)
2008	Erzgebirge Aue	1	(0)
2009	Huddersfield Town	3	(0)
2010	Darlington	0	(0)
2010–2011	Hereford United	6	(0)
2012–2013	SV Scheibenhardt		
2013–2014	FC Homburg	2	(0)
2014–2016	Ånge IF		
- * Club domestic league appearances and goals

Dominik Patrick Werling (born 13 December 1982) is a German former professional footballer who played as a left-back. His father is American and his mother is German.

== Career ==
Werling played for several clubs in Germany before moving to Turkey. In July 2007, he joined Barnsley from Turkish side Sakaryaspor. He remained at the club until January 2008, scoring once against Plymouth Argyle, where he then signed for FC Erzgebirge Aue. On 3 September 2008, it was announced his contract had been terminated by FC Erzgebirge Aue and that he could leave the team.

Following a trial spell, in which he scored a goal in a friendly match against Blackburn Rovers, he joined Football League One side Huddersfield Town on 20 January 2009. He made his debut as a substitute for Lionel Ainsworth in the 1–0 win over Peterborough United on 31 January 2009. At the end of the season, he was not offered a new contract and was released.

On 28 April 2010, it was confirmed that Werling would be rejoining former manager Simon Davey at Darlington for the 2010–11 season. After Davey left, Werling initially stated he was committed to Darlington, but then asked for a transfer. Eventually, without having appeared for the club, he bought himself out of his contract and again rejoined Davey, now at League Two club Hereford United, where he signed a two-year deal but left in February 2011 after falling out of favour at the club. He signed in July 2014 for Swedish Div. 2 team Ånge IF.
