= James McQuilkin =

English footballer

Personal information
- Full name: James Robert Leonard McQuilkin
- Date of birth: 9 January 1989 (age 37)
- Place of birth: Tipton, England
- Height: 5 ft 8 in (1.73 m)
- Position: Midfielder

Team information
- Current team: Stafford Rangers

Youth career
- 2001–2007: West Bromwich Albion

Senior career*
Years	Team	Apps	(Gls)
2007–2008	Tescoma Zlín B	35	(11)
2008–2009	Tescoma Zlín	6	(0)
2009–2013	Hereford United	76	(6)
2012	→ Kidderminster Harriers (loan)	2	(1)
2013–2014	Walsall	9	(0)
2014	Hednesford Town	3	(0)
2014–2015	Torquay United	17	(1)
2015	AFC Telford United	1	(0)
2015	Hednesford Town	1	(0)
2015–2018	Kidderminster Harriers	81	(17)
2018–2020	AFC Telford United	26	(1)
2020–2021	Hereford	11	(1)
2021–2022	Stourbridge		
2022–2024	Hednesford Town		
2024-2026	Stafford Rangers		

International career^{‡}
2008	Northern Ireland U21	1	(0)
- * Club domestic league appearances and goals as of 11:55, 29 August 2021 (UTC) ‡ National team caps and goals as of 00:22, 6 July 2012 (UTC)

James Robert Leonard McQuilkin (born 9 January 1989) is an English footballer who most recently played as a midfielder for Stafford Rangers.

== Career ==
=== Hereford United ===
McQuilkin was born in Tipton, West Midlands. Having previously been attached to West Bromwich Albion and FC Tescoma Zlín, McQuilkin made his Football League debut for Hereford United in their opening home game of the 2009–10 season against Cheltenham Town. He signed a new one-year contract at the end of the 2009–10 season to keep him at the club. After becoming a regular member of the starting XI in his second season at Edgar Street he signed a new contract to keep him at the club until the end of the 2012–13 season. After finding first team chances limited, he joined Kidderminster Harriers on loan for an initial one-month period in January 2012. He made five appearances for the club, scoring once before returning to Hereford after the end of the month's loan period. He was released by Hereford on 22 March 2013.

=== Walsall ===
After leaving Hereford, McQuilkin signed a one-year contract at League One side Walsall on 29 July 2013 following a successful trial spell. Saddlers manager Dean Smith praised McQuilkin, saying: "He has put in some good performances and I have been extremely impressed with his attitude. He is a welcome addition to the squad." He made ten total appearances for the League One club and was released at the end of the season.

=== Non-league ===
McQuilkin played for Conference North club Hednesford Town before signing for Conference National side Torquay United in November 2014. The following January, he was praised by manager Chris Hargreaves for continuing to play despite not being paid.

In August 2015, he signed for AFC Telford United in the National League North, for whom he played in one match before playing one game for Hednesford in the same league a month later. On 10 November, he signed for Kidderminster again, now in the National League. Four days later on his first start, he scored in a 2–0 home win against Aldershot Town.

In June 2018, McQuilkin returned to Telford.

In September 2022, McQuilkin returned to Hednesford Town.

In August 2024, McQuilikin signed for Stafford Rangers. However, after two seasons at the club McQuilkin was released part of the squad clear out in May 2026 at Stafford Rangers as they head into a new era.

== Club statistics ==
As of match played 9 December 2017

Appearances and goals by club, season and competition
Club	Season	League			National Cup		League Cup		Other		Total	
Club	Season	Division	Apps	Goals	Apps	Goals	Apps	Goals	Apps	Goals	Apps	Goals
Zlín	2007–08	Czech First League	4	0	0	0	—		0	0	4	0
Zlín	2008–09	Czech First League	2	0	0	0	—		0	0	2	0
Zlín	Zlín total		6	0	0	0	0	0	0	0	6	0
Hereford United	2009–10	League Two	22	2	0	0	1	0	0	0	23	2
Hereford United	2010–11	League Two	38	3	4	0	1	0	1 (Note: Appearances in the Football League Trophy)	0	44	3
Hereford United	2011–12	League Two	7	0	1	0	2	0	1	0	11	0
Hereford United	2012–13	Conference Premier	9	1	2	0	—		2 (Note: Appearances in the FA Trophy)	0	13	1
Hereford United	Hereford total		76	6	7	0	4	0	4	0	91	6
Kidderminster Harriers (loan)	2011–12	Conference Premier	2	1	0	0	—		2	0	4	1
Walsall	2013–14	League One	9	0	0	0	1	0	0	0	10	0
Hednesford Town	2014–15	Conference North	3	0	0	0	—		0	0	3	0
Torquay United	2014–15	Conference Premier	17	1	0	0	—		5	0	22	1
Telford United	2015–16	National League North	1	0	0	0	—		0	0	1	0
Hednesford Town	2015–16	National League North	1	0	0	0	—		0	0	1	0
Kidderminster Harriers	2015–16	National League	20	6	0	0	—		1	0	21	6
Kidderminster Harriers	2016–17	National League North	42	8	2	0	—		3	0	47	8
Kidderminster Harriers	2017–18	National League North	19	3	2	0	—		1	0	22	3
Kidderminster Harriers	Kidderminster total		81	17	4	0	0	0	5	0	90	17
Career total			195	25	11	0	5	0	16	0	227	25
