= Sam Malsom =

English footballer

Personal information
- Full name: Samuel Andrew Malsom
- Date of birth: 10 November 1987 (age 39)
- Place of birth: Teignmouth, England
- Positions: Winger; attacking midfielder; forward

Team information
- Current team: Hamar

Youth career
- 2001–2004: Torquay United
- 2004–2006: Plymouth Argyle

Senior career*
Years	Team	Apps	(Gls)
- Bishopsteignton
2006–2007	Plymouth Argyle	0	(0)
2006–2007	→ Tiverton Town (loan)	5	(1)
- Crediton United
2008	Stratford Town	10	(7)
2008–2009	B36 Tórshavn	24	(7)
2009	Þróttur	10	(4)
2009–2010	Tiverton Town	10	(1)
2010	Motala AIF	8	(1)
2010–2011	Hereford United	4	(0)
2010	→ Redditch United (loan)	6	(0)
2011	→ Gloucester City (loan)	14	(1)
2011–2012	Weymouth	17	(5)
2012–2013	Dorchester Town	47	(9)
2013–2014	Tiverton Town	36	(12)
2014–2015	Nikos & Sokratis Erimis	22	(8)
2015–2016	Digenis Oroklinis	25	(5)
2016	Omonia Aradippou	11	(0)
2017–	Hamar	37	(27)
- * Club domestic league appearances and goals as of 14:02, 30 September 2019 (UTC)

Samuel Andrew Malsom (born 10 November 1987) is an English professional footballer who plays for Icelandic fourth tier side Hamar. He plays as a winger, attacking midfielder or forward.

== Career ==
=== Early career ===
Born in Exeter, Malsom started out as a youngster at Torquay United playing as a central midfielder, joining the club at the age of 12. However, at the age of 16, he had to leave the club as they were forced to shut down their centre of excellence due to financial problems. He spent time playing local amateur football for Bishopsteignton before writing to Plymouth Argyle asking for a trial, who at the time were in the Football League Championship. Initially told that the club had no space left in their academy, Plymouth scout John James went to watch Malsom playing in the Herald Cup final for Bishopsteignton, during which he scored twice, and invited him to a week-long trial. He eventually signed with the club on a permanent basis, changing positions to play as a forward on the advice of Plymouth youth team manager Stuart Gibson.

He became a prolific goalscorer for the youth and reserve sides at Plymouth, setting a team record with 29 goals in 24 matches, but never made a first team appearance for the club. He spent a short period on loan with Tiverton Town, scoring 2 goals in 4 appearances, but was released by manager Ian Holloway in 2006. Following his release, he spent time on trial DPMM FC and Aldershot Town.

=== B36 Torshavn ===
Malsom's agent later organised a trial with B36 Torshavn in the Faroe Islands, during which he impressed enough for the club to offer him a permanent deal. He mainly played as attacking winger or attacking midfielder for B36 Torshavn where his performances attracted interest. While with B36 he also played in the UEFA Europa League against Danish side Brøndby IF and Olimpi Rustavi from Georgia.

=== Iceland and Sweden ===
His performances for B36 Torshavn earned him a move to Icelandic Premiere League side Knattspyrnufélagið Þróttur for a small fee believed to be in the region of £30,000, who at the time were in the top division in Iceland, Malsom joined the club in the summer transfer window while they were struggling at the bottom end of the league table. He managed to rack up a respectable 5 goals in 10 games for the struggling side but unfortunately the club were relegated at the end of the season and Malsom decided to move on. Malsom then went on to sign for Dundalk in the Irish Premier League but problems with his registration with the Irish F.A meant he wasn't eligible to play until July, Malsom flew back home and signed a short deal with Swedish side Motala AIF where he played on either wing, securing 9 man of the match awards in 15 games and scoring 6 goals.

=== Hereford United ===
Malsom returned to England during the Swedish summer break and after a short trial spell he signed for Hereford United in July 2010, making his debut for the club as a substitute in place of Joe Colbeck in a 3–0 defeat to Colchester United in the League Cup on 10 August 2010 and also made his Football League debut against Chesterfield in the same month. He was loaned to Gloucester City in February 2011 to gain match fitness after spending a couple of months on the sidelines with an injury. He left at the end of the season after finding first team opportunities rare.

=== Weymouth and Dorchester Town ===
Malsom joined Weymouth on non-contract terms in August 2011 and quickly became a first team regular. He went on to sign a permanent contract with the club for rest of the season. Impressive performances and goals including a hat trick against A.F.C Totton attracted interest from other clubs and it was later confirmed he had signed for Dorchester Town for an undisclosed fee in January 2012. Malsom continued to show an eye for goal by scoring 4 goals in three friendly games for Dorchester Town, he followed that up with a superb arching volley into the top corner on his league debut against Havant and Waterlooville and a header against Weston Super Mare. He went on to score 6 goals in 12 games for Dorchester and finished the season with 21 goals with majority of performances coming from out wide. In June 2013, Malsom re-signed for Tiverton Town, a club closer to home where he scored on a regular basis from midfield.

=== Later career ===
After spending three seasons in England, scoring 45 goals from either wing and midfield, Malsom eventually made the move abroad again signing professionally for Nikos and Sokratis Erimis FC in Cyprus. In early 2018, he signed for Icelandic fourth tier side Hamar.
