= Sam Gwynne =

English footballer

Personal information
- Full name: Samuel Luke Gwynne
- Date of birth: 17 December 1987 (age 38)
- Place of birth: Hereford, England
- Position: Defender

Team information
- Current team: Westfields

Youth career
- 2004–2005: Hereford United

Senior career*
Years	Team	Apps	(Gls)
2005–2011	Hereford United	69	(1)
2011	→ A.F.C Telford United (loan)	16	(0)
2011	Neath	11	(0)
2012	Westfields	?	(?)
2012	Brackley Town	0	(0)
2012–2013	Westfields	?	(?)
2013–2014	Hereford United	5	(0)
2014–2015	Westfields	13	(0)
2015	Hereford	3	(0)
2015–	Westfields		
- * Club domestic league appearances and goals as of 23:42, 23 September 2015 (UTC)

Samuel Luke Gwynne (born 17 December 1987) is an English footballer who plays as a defender for Hellenic League Premier Division club Westfields.

== Career ==
Gwynne was born in Hereford and joined the Hereford United youth team, which is associated with the Pershore College football academy at Holme Lacy. He was an unused substitute for several first team matches during the 2004-05 season and started the Conference League Cup match against Northwich Victoria.

His league debut came in the 2005-06 season when he featured as a substitute in the dying minutes of the televised match at home to Stevenage Borough. In the latter half of the season he was an unused substitute on a regular basis. He also captained the side in a Herefordshire Senior Cup match against Kington Town.

He signed a new contract in June 2006, however he was the only player in the squad not to make an appearance in the League, FA Cup or League Cup during the 2006–07 season. On 18 August 2007 he made his Football League debut, coming on as a substitute in the closing minutes away at Barnet. With the departure of Lionel Ainsworth, Gwynne was handed a chance in the first team and made 16 appearances in mid-season. Originally allowed to leave the club at the end of the 2009–10 season, he was eventually offered a new one-year deal to remain at Hereford. He joined A.F.C.Telford United on loan until the end of the season in February 2011. In May 2011 he left Hereford United after seven years with the club.

In August 2011 he joined Welsh Premier League club Neath. Gwynne was released by Neath in the new year and re-joined Westfields.

After a short spell at Brackley Town he joined Westfields where he made 49 appearances in all competitions in the 2012–13 season where the club finished runners up in the Midland Alliance.

Gwynne re-joined his first club Hereford United on non-contract terms on 31 July 2013 but remained available to Westfields when not needed at Edgar Street under a dual registration agreement.

After leaving Hereford United he remained at Westfields for the 2014–15 season.

Gwynne signed for phoenix club Hereford on 7 August 2015, however he left shortly after to re-join Westfields.
