= Russell Bradley =

English footballer

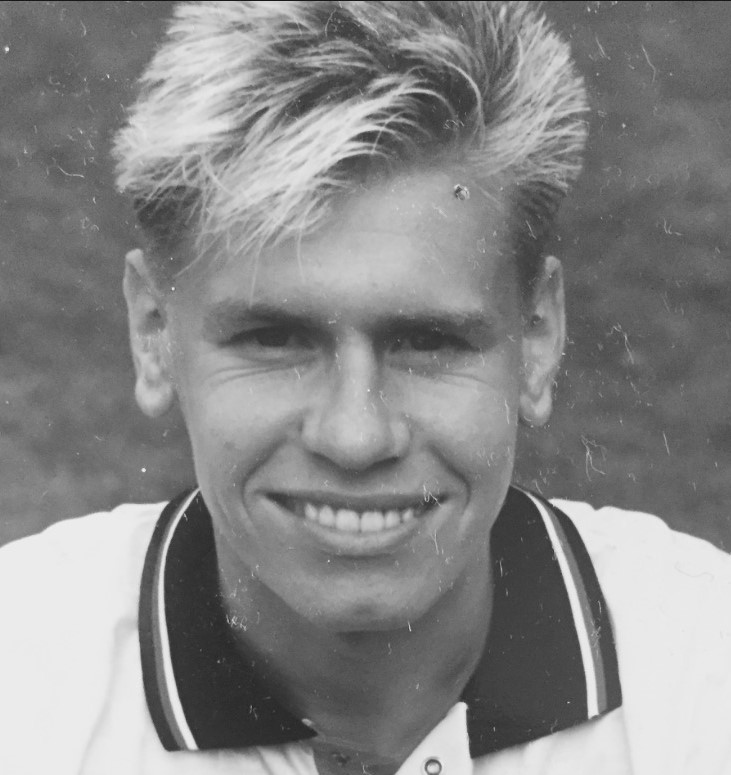

Personal information
- Full name: Russell Bradley
- Date of birth: 28 March 1966 (age 60)
- Place of birth: Birmingham, England
- Position: Centre back

Senior career*
Years	Team	Apps	(Gls)
–	Dudley Town		
1988–1989	Nottingham Forest	0	(0)
1988	→ Hereford United (loan)	12	(1)
1989–1991	Hereford United	77	(3)
1991–1993	Halifax Town	56	(3)
1993–1997	Scunthorpe United	119	(5)
1997	→ Hartlepool United (loan)	12	(1)
1997–1998	Hartlepool United	43	(1)
1998–2001	Hednesford Town	85	(1)
- * Club domestic league appearances and goals

Russell Bradley (born 28 March 1966) is an English former footballer and highly rated left footed centre back who played in the Football League for Nottingham Forest, Hereford United, Halifax Town, Scunthorpe United and Hartlepool United.

He played for Kidderminster Harriers and Dudley Town before joining Nottingham Forest. After a serious injury he left Forest and signed for Hereford Utd having made a few appearances for Forest's first team in the League Cup and Simod Cup. His Professional career finished in 2002 aged 36, after playing for Hednesford Town in the National League.
