= Zac Evans =

Welsh footballer (born 1991)

Personal information
- Full name: Zacharia Douglas Evans
- Date of birth: 3 June 1991 (age 35)
- Place of birth: Presteigne, Wales
- Position: Midfielder

Youth career
- 2009–2010: Cardiff City

Senior career*
Years	Team	Apps	(Gls)
2010–2011	Hereford United	0	(0)
2011–2014	Newtown	35	(9)
2014–?	Bath City		
- * Club domestic league appearances and goals as of 07:55, 5 August 2012 (UTC)

Zacharia Douglas Evans (born 3 May 1991) is a Welsh footballer who plays as a midfielder for Newtown.

== Playing career ==
Evans was a hot prospect in the Welsh region wanted by clubs such as Newcastle, Manchester City and others after his performances as a youngster caught the eye of a host of top flight clubs. On 13 August 2010, Presteigne-born Evans joined Hereford United of League Two on a one-year deal. He made his debut in the Football League Trophy second round 3–0 defeat by Exeter City on 5 October 2010, replacing Richard Rose on 56 minutes but was released in January 2011.

Evans joined Welsh Premier League club Newtown towards the end of the 2009–2010. He failed to score his first goal for Newtown. Saturday 17 December 2011 as a penalty against Airbus UK in a Welsh Premier League match.
