= O'Neil Thompson =

Jamaican footballer (born 1983)

Personal information
- Full name: O'Neil Anthony Michael Tyrone Thompson
- Date of birth: 11 August 1983 (age 43)
- Place of birth: Kingston, Jamaica
- Height: 6 ft 4 in (1.93 m)
- Positions: Defender; midfielder

Team information
- Current team: Arnett Gardens F.C.

Senior career*
Years	Team	Apps	(Gls)
2003–2007	Boys' Town	?	(?)
2007–2009	Notodden FK	46	(1)
2009–2010	Barnsley	1	(0)
2010	→ Burton Albion (loan)	2	(0)
2010	→ Hereford United (loan)	6	(0)
2011–2014	Boys' Town	15	(0)
2014–	Arnett Gardens F.C.	25	(0)

International career
2006–2012	Jamaica	21	(1)
- * Club domestic league appearances and goals as of 16 January 2011

O'Neil Anthony Michael Tyrone Thompson (born 11 August 1983) is a Jamaican international footballer who professionally for Arnett Gardens F.C. Thompson can play as either a defender or midfielder.

== Career ==
=== Club career ===
Born in Kingston, Thompson began his senior career with Boys' Town in 2003. He moved to Norwegian side Notodden FK in 2007, spending three seasons with the club. He then moved to English side Barnsley in August 2009. On 18 January 2010 Thompson moved to League Two side Burton Albion on a month-long loan. On 14 May 2010, Thompson was set to join Darlington, but the deal fell through, and he later signed a loan deal with Hereford United.

On 1 November 2010, Barnsley, Hereford, and Thompson agreed to cancel the player's contract after he said he wanted to return home to Jamaica, Thompson made a total of 11 appearances in English football across all competitions. where he re-signed for Boys' Town in January 2011. In 2014 Thompson joined Arnett Gardens F.C., where he won the domestic title.

=== International career ===
Thompson made his international debut for Jamaica in an April 2006 friendly match against the United States.

Thompson has played at the 2008 Caribbean Championship and 2009 CONCACAF Gold Cup, as well as in 2 World Cup Qualifying matches.

== Career statistics ==
=== International ===
Appearances and goals by national team and year
National team	Year	Apps	Goals
Jamaica	2006	6	0
Jamaica	2007	2	0
Jamaica	2008	9	1
Jamaica	2009	3	0
Jamaica	2010	–	
Jamaica	2011	–	
Jamaica	2012	1	0
Total		21	1

Scores and results list Jamaica's goal tally first, score column indicates score after each Thompson goal.

List of international goals scored by O'Neil Thompson
No.	Date	Venue	Opponent	Score	Result	Competition
1	11 December 2008	Independence Park, Kingston, Jamaica	Guadeloupe	1–0	2–0	2008 Caribbean Cup

== Honors ==
Arnett Gardens F.C.

- Jamaica National Premier League: 1

2015
