= Alan Lamb (footballer, born 1970) =

English footballer

Personal information
- Date of birth: 30 January 1970 (age 56)
- Place of birth: Gateshead, England
- Position: Striker

Senior career*
Years	Team	Apps	(Gls)
1988–1989	Nottingham Forest	0	(0)
1989	→ Hereford United (loan)	10	(2)
1989–1990	Hartlepool United	14	(0)
1990–1991	Brandon United	?	(?)
1991	Newcastle United (trial)	0	(0)
1991–1995	Gateshead	130	(37)
1999	Gateshead	10	(1)
- * Club domestic league appearances and goals

Alan Lamb (born 30 January 1970) was an English footballer who played as a striker.

Lamb started his career with Nottingham Forest in 1988, making a loan move to Hereford United in 1989, scoring 2 goals in 10 league appearances. Lamb signed for Hartlepool United at the start of the 1989-90 season where he played 14 league games before a move to non-league Brandon United. Lamb had a two-month trial at Newcastle United from October–December 1991 before signing for non-league Gateshead. Lamb also played in New Zealand between 1995 and 1999.

== Sources ==
- "allfootballers.com". Archived from the original on 5 April 2010.
- "Post War English & Scottish Football League A - Z Player's Transfer Database - Hereford United".
- "Post War English & Scottish Football League A - Z Player's Transfer Database - Hartlepool United".
- "NUFC.com - Where Are They Now? - L". Archived from the original on 14 January 2010.
- "Unofficial Gateshead Football Club Statistics Database". Archived from the original on 22 April 2010.
- "Holker Street Newsletter 291 - 17th February 1999".
