= 2008–09 Hereford United F.C. season =

Hereford United
2008–09 season
- Chairman: Graham Turner
- Manager: Graham Turner (until 24 April); John Trewick (from 24 April)
- League One: 24th (relegated)
- FA Cup: First round (replay)
- League Cup: First round
- Football League Trophy: Second round (Southern)
- Top goalscorer: League: Steve Guinan (15); All: Steve Guinan (15)
- Highest home attendance: 6,120 v Leeds United, League One, 17 February 2009
- Lowest home attendance: 1,458 v Swindon Town, Football League Trophy, 7 October 2008
- Average home league attendance: 3,270
- Biggest win: 5–0 v Oldham Athletic (H), League One, 17 January 2009
- Biggest defeat: 1–6 v Bristol Rovers (A), League One, 23 August 2008
Home colours	Away colours

The 2008–09 season was the 88th competitive season of Hereford United Football Club, fifth ever season in the third tier of English football and 28th season overall in the Football League. The club competed in League One following their promotion from League Two in the previous season. Hereford's previous season at this level was the 1977–78 season when they suffered a second consecutive relegation, finishing 23rd, despite having won the same division just two years previously. The club also competed in the FA Cup, FA Trophy and Football League Trophy.

Hereford reached League One on the back of two promotions in three seasons, having won the Conference play-offs in 2005–06, and finished third in League Two in 2007–08. Graham Turner was voted League Two Manager of the Year by the League Managers Association for the latter achievement and entered his 14th season at the club.

Hereford struggled in League One, and after the first 15 matches they were bottom with 9 points. For the vast majority of the season the Bulls were in the relegation zone and were relegated on 18 April after a sixth consecutive defeat – their worst form of the season. Hereford did manage to achieve the double over both Cheltenham Town and Carlisle United. Their two other notable results were a 5–0 home win over Oldham Athletic, and a 2–0 home win over Leeds United.

The top goalscorer of the season is Steve Guinan with 15 goals, all scored in the league. Guinan is the club's longest serving player with 68 goals in 176 appearances. In a cumulative four and a half season spell, he has featured for the club in the Football League, Conference, Play-offs, FA Cup, Football League Cup, Football League Trophy and FA Trophy during his three spells with the club – having been signed twice and loaned once.

Graham Turner stepped down as manager following confirmation of relegation and appointed John Trewick, first team coach for the last 5 seasons, as the new manager for the remaining two matches of the season and beyond.

== First-team squad ==
As of 2 May 2009

Note: Flags indicate national team as defined under FIFA eligibility rules; some limited exceptions apply. Players may hold more than one non-FIFA nationality.

No.	Pos.	Nation	Player
2	DF	ENG	Richard Rose
4	MF	FRA	Toumani Diagouraga
6	MF	ENG	Kris Taylor
7	FW	ENG	Febian Brandy (on loan from Manchester United)
8	MF	ENG	Ben Smith
9	FW	ENG	Steve Guinan (captain)
10	FW	GHA	Bradley Hudson-Odoi
12	MF	ENG	Marc Pugh (on loan from Shrewsbury Town)
15	MF	ENG	Sam Gwynne
16	MF	ENG	Jack Macleod
17	MF	IRL	Stephen O'Leary

No.	Pos.	Nation	Player
19	MF	ENG	Craig Jones
20	FW	ENG	Andy Williams (on loan from Bristol Rovers)
21	DF	ENG	Richard Jackson
22	MF	WAL	Matt Done
24	MF	CAN	Michael D'Agostino
25	GK	CPV	José Veiga
28	DF	ENG	Dean Beckwith
29	DF	ENG	Josh Gowling (on loan from Carlisle United)
31	MF	ENG	Jennison Myrie-Williams (on loan from Bristol City)
33	GK	HUN	Péter Gulácsi (on loan from Liverpool)

== Transfers ==
=== In ===
Date	Pos.	No.	Player	Transferred from	Fee	Ref.
17 June 2008	MF	22	(England) Matt Done	Wrexham	Undisclosed	
1 July 2008	DF	5	(Republic of Ireland) Garry Breen	Free agent	Free transfer	
7 July 2008	GK	—	(England) Nick Jordan	Free agent	Free transfer	
7 July 2008	MF	4	(France) Toumani Diagouraga	Watford	Free transfer	
16 July 2008	FW	10	(Ghana) Bradley Hudson-Odoi	Fulham	Free transfer	
21 July 2008	GK	14	(Scotland) Craig Samson	Free agent	Free transfer	
7 August 2008	DF	12	(England) Sam Oji	Free agent	Free transfer	
28 August 2008	MF	17	(Republic of Ireland) Stephen O'Leary	Free agent	Free transfer	
4 September 2008	DF	21	(England) Richard Jackson	Free agent	Free transfer	
10 September 2008	FW	24	(England) Nick Chadwick	Free agent	Free transfer	
20 February 2009	MF	24	(Canada) Michael D'Agostino	Free agent	Free transfer	

=== Out ===
Date	Pos.	No.	Player	To club	Fee	Ref.
16 May 2008	GK	14	(Northern Ireland) Michael Ingham	Free agent	Released	
16 May 2008	DF	5	(England) John McCombe	Free agent	Released	
19 May 2008	FW	12	(Jamaica) Trevor Benjamin	Free agent	Released	
19 May 2008	GK	33	(Scotland) Ryan Esson	Free agent	Released	
19 May 2008	MF	17	(England) Jordan Fitzpatrick	Free agent	Released	
19 May 2008	FW	19	(England) Marcus Palmer	Free agent	Released	
5 June 2008	GK	1	(England) Wayne Brown	Bury	Free transfer	
30 June 2008	DF	2	(Australia) Trent McClenahan	Free agent	Released	
29 August 2008	MF	21	(England) Luke Webb	Free agent	Released	
8 January 2009	FW	24	(England) Nick Chadwick	Free agent	Released	
3 February 2009	DF	5	(Republic of Ireland) Garry Breen	Free agent	Released	
5 February 2009	DF	12	(England) Sam Oji	Free agent	Released	
3 April 2009	MF	11	(England) Clint Easton	Free agent	Released	
14 April 2009	GK	14	(Scotland) Craig Samson	Free agent	Released	
21 April 2009	MF	23	(England) Simon Johnson	Free agent	Released	

=== Loans in ===
Date from	Date to	Pos.	No.	Name	From club	Ref.
11 July 2008	11 January 2008	GK	1	(Republic of Ireland) Darren Randolph	Charlton Athletic	
16 July 2008	5 January 2009	DF	3	(England) Robbie Threlfall	Liverpool	
5 August 2008	3 January 2009	FW	7	(Antigua and Barbuda) Moses Ashikodi	Watford	
1 September 2008	End of season	FW	20	(England) Andy Williams	Bristol Rovers	
25 September 2008	25 November 2008	DF	27	(France) Bruno Ngotty	Leicester City	
12 November 2008	12 December 2008	GK	25	(England) Matt Murray	Wolverhampton Wanderers	
20 November 2008	22 January 2009	MF	26	(England) Lionel Ainsworth	Watford	
27 November 2008	21 January 2009	GK	33	(England) Chris Weale	Bristol City	
27 November 2008	End of season	DF	29	(England) Josh Gowling	Carlisle United	
5 January 2009	5 April 2009	MF	30	(England) Sam Hewson	Manchester United	
23 January 2009	23 February 2009	MF	31	(England) Jennison Myrie-Williams	Bristol City	
2 February 2009	End of season	GK	33	(Hungary) Péter Gulácsi	Liverpool	
3 February 2009	End of season	FW	7	(Saint Kitts and Nevis) Febian Brandy	Manchester United	
17 February 2009	17 March 2009	DF	27	(Ghana) Godwin Antwi	Liverpool	
13 March 2009	13 April 2009	DF	32	(Republic of Ireland) Darren Dennehy	Cardiff City	
26 March 2009	End of season	MF	12	(England) Marc Pugh	Shrewsbury Town	
26 March 2009	End of season	MF	31	(England) Jennison Myrie-Williams	Bristol City	

=== Loans out ===
Date from	Date to	Pos.	No.	Name	To club	Ref.
12 December 2008	10 January 2009	MF	19	(Wales) Craig Jones	Redditch United	
6 March 2009	6 April 2009	FW	10	(Ghana) Bradley Hudson-Odoi	Grays Athletic	

== Pre-season ==
Win Draw Loss

8 July 2008	Ledbury Town	0–10	Hereford United	Ledbury
		Report	Guinan 2', 17'; Taylor 16'; Smith 27', 32'; Hudson-Odoi 29'; Done 39'; Moses 50'; Johnson 81'; Gwynne 88'	Stadium: New Street; Attendance: c. 400

10 July 2008	Birmingham City	2–2	Hereford United	Kings Norton, Birmingham
	O'Connor; Sheldon	Report	Rose; Jones	Stadium: Wast Hills Training Ground; Attendance: 0
Note: Match played behind closed doors with 40-minute halves

14 July 2008	Kidderminster Harriers	1–0	Hereford United	Kidderminster
	Knights 2'	Report		Stadium: Aggborough Stadium; Attendance: 661; Referee: Anthony Hendley

16 July 2008	Hereford United	1–3	Wolverhampton Wanderers	Hereford
	Guinan 15' (pen.)	Report	Kightly 31'; Ward 47', 75'	Stadium: Edgar Street; Attendance: 1,538; Referee: Oliver Langford

19 July 2008	Hereford United	2–2	Birmingham City	Hereford
	Guinan 30'; Johnson 85'	Report	Strevens 53'; Sammons 57'	Stadium: Edgar Street; Attendance: 553; Referee: Steve Bratt

22 July 2008	Hereford United	2–2	Bristol City	Hereford
	Johnson 52'; Breen 72'	Report	Trundle 61' (pen.); Murray 78'	Stadium: Edgar Street; Attendance: 830; Referee: Craig Sarginson

29 July 2008	Hereford United	0–0	Southampton	Hereford
		Report		Stadium: Edgar Street; Attendance: 1,209; Referee: Andrew Bennett

1 August 2008	Hereford United	1–2	West Bromwich Albion	Hereford
	Ani 51'	Report	Beattie 63', 75'	Stadium: Edgar Street; Attendance: 1,692; Referee: Peter Gibbs

5 August 2008	Wrexham	2–1	Hereford United	Wrexham
	Williams		Barnes 22'	Attendance: 0
Note: Match played behind closed doors

== Competitions ==
=== Overview ===
Competition	First match	Last match	Starting round	Final position	Record							
Competition	First match	Last match	Starting round	Final position	Pld	W	D	L	GF	GA	GD	Win %
League One	9 August 2008	2 May 2009	Matchday 1	24th	46	9	7	30	42	79	−37	19.57
FA Cup	8 November 2008	18 November 2008	First round	First round	2	0	1	1	1	2	−1	0.00
League Cup	12 August 2008		First round	First round	1	0	0	1	1	2	−1	0.00
Football League Trophy	7 October 2008		Second round (Southern)	Second round (Southern)	1	0	0	1	1	2	−1	0.00
Herefordshire Senior Cup	4 November 2008	28 April 2009	Quarter-finals	Semi-finals	2	1	1	0	5	2	+3	50.00
Total					52	10	9	33	50	87	−37	19.23

Source: Football Club History Database - Hereford United

=== League One ===
==== League table ====
Pos	Team	Pld	W	D	L	GF	GA	GD	Pts	Promotion or relegation
20	Carlisle United	46	12	14	20	56	69	−13	50	
21	Northampton Town (R)	46	12	13	21	61	65	−4	49	Relegation to Football League Two
22	Crewe Alexandra (R)	46	12	10	24	59	82	−23	46	Relegation to Football League Two
23	Cheltenham Town (R)	46	9	12	25	51	91	−40	39	Relegation to Football League Two
24	Hereford United (R)	46	9	7	30	42	79	−37	34	Relegation to Football League Two

Updated to match(es) played on 2 May 2009. Source: The Football League
Rules for classification: 1) points; 2) goal difference; 3) number of goals scored.
(R) Relegated

==== Results summary ====
Overall								Home						Away					
Pld	W	D	L	GF	GA	GD	Pts	W	D	L	GF	GA	GD	W	D	L	GF	GA	GD
46	9	7	30	42	79	−37	34	6	4	13	23	28	−5	3	3	17	19	51	−32

Last updated: 2 May 2009.
Source: Football Web Pages

==== Results by round ====
Round	1	2	3	4	5	6	7	8	9	10	11	12	13	14	15	16	17	18	19	20	21	22	23	24	25	26	27	28	29	30	31	32	33	34	35	36	37	38	39	40	41	42	43	44	45	46
Ground	A	H	A	H	H	A	H	A	H	A	A	H	H	A	A	H	H	A	A	H	A	H	A	H	A	H	A	A	H	H	H	A	H	H	A	A	A	H	A	H	H	A	H	A	A	H
Result	L	L	L	W	D	L	L	L	D	L	D	W	L	L	L	W	L	L	W	D	L	D	L	W	D	L	L	W	W	L	W	L	L	L	L	L	W	L	L	L	L	L	L	D	L	L
Position	19	23	24	22	21	23	24	24	24	24	24	23	23	23	24	22	22	22	22	23	23	23	23	22	22	22	23	22	22	23	23	23	23	23	23	23	23	23	23	23	23	24	24	24	24	24
Points	0	0	0	3	4	4	4	4	5	5	6	9	9	9	9	12	12	12	15	16	16	17	17	20	21	21	21	24	27	27	30	30	30	30	30	30	33	33	33	33	33	33	33	34	34	34

Source: Football Web Pages
A = Away; H = Home; W = Win; D = Draw; L = Loss

==== Matches ====
Date	Opponents	H / A	Result F – A	Scorers	Attendance	League position
9 August 2008	Leyton Orient	A	1–2	Beckwith 14'	4,727	18th
16 August 2008	Yeovil Town	H	1–2	Hudson-Odoi 82'	3,476	22nd
23 August 2008	Bristol Rovers	A	1–6	Guinan 90'	6,735	24th
30 August 2008	Crewe Alexandra	H	2–0	O'Leary 48', Hudson-Odoi 56'	2,894	22nd
5 September 2008	Swindon Town	H	1–1	Hudson-Odoi 68'	4,061	20th
13 September 2008	Southend United	A	0–1		6,393	23rd
20 September 2008	Scunthorpe United	H	1–2	Chadwick 25' (pen)	3,004	24th
27 September 2008	Leeds United	A	0–1		25,676	24th
4 October 2008	Walsall	H	0–0		3,900	24th
12 October 2008	Oldham Athletic	A	0–4		5,468	24th
18 October 2008	Brighton & Hove Albion	A	0–0		5,608	24th
21 October 2008	Carlisle United	H	1–0	Williams 60'	2,300	23rd
25 October 2008	Stockport County	H	0–1		3,210	23rd
28 October 2008	Millwall	A	0–1		9,071	23rd
1 November 2008	Peterborough United	A	0–2		6,087	24th
15 November 2008	Cheltenham Town	H	3–0	Guinan 15', 26', Gwynne 55'	3,761	22nd
22 November 2008	Northampton Town	H	0–2		3,061	22nd
25 November 2008	Milton Keynes Dons	A	0–3		7,189	22nd
6 December 2008	Colchester United	A	2–1	Guinan 29', Ainsworth 39'	4,794	22nd
13 December 2008	Hartlepool United	H	1–1	Guinan 18'	2,490	23rd
20 December 2008	Huddersfield Town	A	0–2		13,070	23rd
26 December 2008	Tranmere Rovers	H	2–2	Diagouraga 45', Guinan 65'	3,495	23rd
28 December 2008	Leicester City	A	1–2	Broadhurst 79'	22,920	23rd
17 January 2009	Oldham Athletic	H	5–0	Guinan 3', 10', 41', Ainsworth 27', 62'	3,342	22nd
24 January 2009	Walsall	A	1–1	Guinan 58' (pen)	4,438	22nd
27 January 2009	Millwall	H	0–2		3,001	22nd
31 January 2009	Stockport County	A	1–4	Hewson 26'	5,586	23rd
14 February 2009	Cheltenham Town	A	3–2	Brandy 13', Hewson 67', 80'	4,660	22nd
17 February 2009	Leeds United	H	2–0	Myrie-Williams 39', Brandy 62'	6,120	22nd
21 February 2009	Peterborough United	H	0–1		3,217	23rd
28 February 2009	Leyton Orient	H	2–1	Brandy 6', Guinan 16' (pen)	3,286	23rd
7 March 2009	Crewe Alexandra	A	1–2	Diagouraga 79'	5,195	23rd
10 March 2009	Bristol Rovers	H	0–3		3,199	23rd
14 March 2009	Southend United	H	0–1		2,663	23rd
17 March 2009	Scunthorpe United	A	0–3		3,672	23rd
21 March 2009	Swindon Town	A	0–3		7,129	23rd
24 March 2009	Carlisle United	A	2–1	Guinan 7', Smith 24'	4,223	23rd
28 March 2009	Huddersfield Town	H	0–1		2,979	23rd
4 April 2009	Hartlepool United	A	2–4	Brandy 11', Pugh 28'	3,579	23rd
7 April 2009	Brighton & Hove Albion	H	1–2	Taylor 90'	2,033	23rd
11 April 2009	Leicester City	H	1–3	Guinan 29' (pen)	4,389	23rd
13 April 2009	Tranmere Rovers	A	1–2	Guinan 90' (pen)	5,945	24th
18 April 2009	Colchester United	H	0–2		2,100	24th
21 April 2009	Yeovil Town	A	2–2	Myrie-Williams 27', Guinan 61'	3,780	24th
25 April 2009	Northampton Town	A	1–2	Williams 51'	5,518	24th
2 May 2009	Milton Keynes Dons	H	0–1		3,224	24th

=== FA Cup ===
Win Draw Loss

8 November 2008 First round	Hereford United	0–0	Dagenham & Redbridge	Hereford
15:00 GMT	Broadhurst (yellow card) 71'	Report		Stadium: Edgar Street; Attendance: 1,825; Referee: Karl Evans

18 November 2008 Replay	Dagenham & Redbridge	2–1	Hereford United	Dagenham
19:45 GMT	Benson 17'; Taiwo 33'; Ritchie (yellow card) 78'	Report	Taylor 34'; Broadhurst (yellow card) 90+5'	Stadium: Victoria Road; Attendance: 1,409; Referee: Darren Deadman

=== League Cup ===
Win Draw Loss

12 August 2008 First round	Crystal Palace	2–1	Hereford United	Selhurst
20:00 BST	Carle 45'; Oster 49'	Report	Ashikodi 41', (yellow card) 90'	Stadium: Selhurst Park; Attendance: 3,094; Referee: Trevor Kettle

=== Football League Trophy ===
Win Draw Loss

7 October 2008 Second round	Hereford United	1–2	Swindon Town	Hereford
19:45 GMT	Done 30'	Report	Cox 45'+2', (yellow card) 90+2'; Peacock 84'	Stadium: Edgar Street; Attendance: 1,458; Referee: Steve Bratt

=== Herefordshire Senior Cup ===
Win Draw Loss

4 November 2008 Quarter-finals	Pegasus Juniors	1–4	Hereford United	Hereford
19:45 GMT	Gwynne 6'	Report	Chadwick 23' (pen.), 25', 90'; Johnson 84'	Stadium: Old School Lane; Attendance: 157

28 April 2009 Semi-finals	Westfields	1–1 (a.e.t.) (3–2 p)	Hereford United	Hereford
19:45 GMT	Upcott 71'	Report	McPike 35'	Stadium: allpay.park Referee: Steve Moggs
	Penalties
	Hibbard (penalty scored); Jones (penalty missed); Green (penalty missed); Upcott (penalty scored); Harrison (penalty missed); Allam (penalty scored)		(penalty missed) McPike; (penalty missed) Jones; (penalty scored) Macleod; (penalty scored) Done; (penalty missed) Melbourne; (penalty missed) El-Abd

== Squad statistics ==
As of match played 2 May 2009

=== Appearance and goals ===
- The plus (+) symbol denotes an appearance as a substitute, hence 2+1 indicates two appearances in the starting XI and one appearance as a substitute
- Players with zero appearances are not included
- Statistics from the HFA Senior Floodlit Cup are not included

No.	Pos	Nat	Player	Total		League One		FA Cup		League Cup		FL Trophy	
No.	Pos	Nat	Player	Apps	Goals	Apps	Goals	Apps	Goals	Apps	Goals	Apps	Goals
2	DF	(England) ENG	Richard Rose	45	0	40+2	0	1+1	0	1	0	0	0
4	MF	(France) FRA	Toumani Diagouraga	48	2	45	2	2	0	1	0	0	0
6	MF	(England) ENG	Kris Taylor	43	2	38+1	1	2	1	1	0	1	0
7	FW	(Saint Kitts and Nevis) SKN	Febian Brandy	15	4	14+1	4	0	0	0	0	0	0
8	MF	(England) ENG	Ben Smith	40	1	29+8	1	2	0	1	0	0	0
9	FW	(England) ENG	Steve Guinan	46	15	40+3	15	2	0	0+1	0	0	0
10	FW	(Ghana) GHA	Bradley Hudson-Odoi	20	3	10+6	3	1+1	0	0+1	0	0+1	0
12	MF	(England) ENG	Marc Pugh	9	1	8+1	1	0	0	0	0	0	0
15	MF	(England) ENG	Sam Gwynne	22	1	17+4	1	1	0	0	0	0	0
16	MF	(England) ENG	Jack Macleod	6	0	2+4	0	0	0	0	0	0	0
17	MF	(Republic of Ireland) IRL	Stephen O'Leary	17	1	11+4	1	1	0	0	0	1	0
18	DF	(England) ENG	Karl Broadhurst	28	1	23+2	1	2	0	0	0	1	0
19	MF	(England) ENG	Craig Jones	3	0	1+2	0	0	0	0	0	0	0
20	FW	(England) ENG	Andy Williams	29	2	19+7	2	2	0	0	0	0+1	0
21	DF	(England) ENG	Richard Jackson	26	0	23+1	0	0+1	0	0	0	1	0
22	MF	(Wales) WAL	Matt Done	39	1	24+12	0	0+1	0	1	0	1	1
25	GK	(Cape Verde) CPV	José Veiga	1	0	1	0	0	0	0	0	0	0
28	DF	(England) ENG	Dean Beckwith	29	1	22+3	1	2	0	1	0	1	0
29	DF	(England) ENG	Josh Gowling	13	0	13	0	0	0	0	0	0	0
31	MF	(England) ENG	Jennison Myrie-Williams	15	2	15	2	0	0	0	0	0	0
33	GK	(Hungary) HUN	Péter Gulácsi	18	0	18	0	0	0	0	0	0	0
Players who left during the season but made an appearance
1	GK	(Republic of Ireland) IRL	Darren Randolph	14	0	13	0	0	0	1	0	0	0
3	DF	(England) ENG	Robbie Threlfall	4	0	3	0	0	0	1	0	0	0
7	FW	(Antigua and Barbuda) ATG	Moses Ashikodi	8	1	4+2	0	0	0	1	1	1	0
11	MF	(England) ENG	Clint Easton	16	0	9+3	0	2	0	0+1	0	1	0
12	DF	(England) ENG	Sam Oji	5	0	4	0	0	0	1	0	0	0
14	GK	(Scotland) SCO	Craig Samson	14	0	10+1	0	2	0	0	0	1	0
23	MF	(England) ENG	Simon Johnson	33	0	9+21	0	0+1	0	1	0	1	0
24	FW	(England) ENG	Nick Chadwick	12	1	5+5	1	0+1	0	0	0	1	0
25	GK	(England) ENG	Matt Murray	3	0	3	0	0	0	0	0	0	0
26	MF	(England) ENG	Lionel Ainsworth	7	3	7	3	0	0	0	0	0	0
27	DF	(France) FRA	Bruno Ngotty	8	0	8	0	0	0	0	0	0	0
27	DF	(Ghana) GHA	Godwin Antwi	5	0	5	0	0	0	0	0	0	0
30	MF	(England) ENG	Sam Hewson	10	3	9+1	3	0	0	0	0	0	0
32	DF	(Republic of Ireland) IRL	Darren Dennehy	3	0	3	0	0	0	0	0	0	0
33	GK	(England) ENG	Chris Weale	1	0	1	0	0	0	0	0	0	0
