= 2007–08 Hereford United F.C. season =

Hereford United
2007–08 season
- Chairman: Graham Turner
- Manager: Graham Turner
- League Two: 3rd (promoted)
- FA Cup: Fourth round
- League Cup: Second round
- Football League Trophy: First round (Southern)
- Top goalscorer: League: Theo Robinson (13); All: Theo Robinson (16)
- Highest home attendance: 6,855 v Cardiff City, FA Cup, 27 January 2008
- Lowest home attendance: 1,859 v Yeovil Town, League Cup, 9 October 2007
- Average home league attendance: 3,421
- Biggest win: 5–1 v Darlington (H), League Two, 3 November 2007
- Biggest defeat: 0–4 v Chesterfield (A), League Two, 21 January 2008
Home colours	Away colours

The 2007–08 season was Hereford United's 27th season in the Football League and ended in the club winning promotion to League One, the third tier of English football, for the first time in 30 years.

It was Hereford's second season back in the Football League after nine seasons spent in the Conference. The previous season had seen Hereford finish 16th after a poor run of form in the final stages of the season. On the strength of this they were predicted to battle against relegation this season by most media sources. Only one member of the 2007-08 squad was purchased for a transfer fee, Ben Smith who was signed from Weymouth for £20,000 in January 2007.

On 26 April 2008 they secured 3rd place and promotion to League One.

== First-team squad ==
As of 3 May 2008

Note: Flags indicate national team as defined under FIFA eligibility rules; some limited exceptions apply. Players may hold more than one non-FIFA nationality.

No.	Pos.	Nation	Player
1	GK	ENG	Wayne Brown
2	DF	AUS	Trent McClenahan
4	DF	ENG	Richard Rose
5	DF	ENG	John McCombe
6	DF	ENG	Karl Broadhurst (captain)
7	MF	ENG	Jack Macleod
8	MF	ENG	Ben Smith
9	FW	ENG	Steve Guinan
10	MF	ENG	Kris Taylor
11	MF	ENG	Clint Easton
12	FW	JAM	Trevor Benjamin
14	GK	NIR	Michael Ingham

No.	Pos.	Nation	Player
15	MF	ENG	Sam Gwynne
16	DF	ENG	Robbie Threlfall (on loan from Liverpool)
17	MF	ENG	Jordan Fitzpatrick
18	DF	ENG	Lee Collins (on loan from Wolverhampton Wanderers)
19	FW	ENG	Marcus Palmer
20	MF	FRA	Toumani Diagouraga (on loan from Watford)
21	MF	ENG	Luke Webb
22	FW	JAM	Theo Robinson (on loan from Watford)
23	FW	ENG	Simon Johnson
27	MF	ENG	Craig Jones
28	DF	ENG	Dean Beckwith
33	GK	SCO	Ryan Esson

== Transfers ==
=== In ===
Date	Pos.	No.	Player	Transferred from	Fee	Ref.
12 June 2007	FW	9	(England) Steve Guinan	Cheltenham Town	Free transfer	
4 July 2007	DF	6	(England) Karl Broadhurst	Bournemouth	Free transfer	
4 July 2007	DF	5	(England) John McCombe	Huddersfield Town	Free transfer	
4 July 2007	MF	10	(England) Kris Taylor	Walsall	Free transfer	
19 July 2007	MF	11	(England) Clint Easton	Gillingham	Free transfer	
2 August 2007	FW	12	(Jamaica) Trevor Benjamin	Peterborough United	Free transfer	
2 August 2007	MF	7	(England) Lionel Ainsworth	Derby County	Free transfer	
8 August 2007	FW	23	(England) Simon Johnson	Darlington	Free transfer	
17 August 2007	GK	14	(Northern Ireland) Michael Ingham	Wrexham	Free transfer	
31 August 2007	MF	27	(England) Craig Jones	Academy	Free transfer	
31 August 2007	DF	—	(Antigua and Barbuda) Marvin McCoy	Watford	Free transfer	
18 January 2008	MF	7	(England) Jack Macleod	Carshalton Athletic	Free transfer	
17 March 2008	GK	33	(Scotland) Ryan Esson	Shrewsbury Town	Free transfer	

=== Out ===
Date	Pos.	No.	Player	To club	Fee	Ref.
14 May 2007	MF	8	(England) Andy Ferrell	Kidderminster Harriers	Released	
14 May 2007	FW	10	(Wales) Stuart Fleetwood	Forest Green Rovers	Released	
14 May 2007	DF	17	(Wales) Martyn Giles	Newport County	Released	
14 May 2007	MF	3	(England) Danny Thomas	Macclesfield Town	Released	
14 May 2007	GK	14	(England) Glyn Thompson	Newport County	Released	
29 May 2007	MF	23	(England) Phil Gulliver	Rushden & Diamonds	Undisclosed	
6 June 2007	MF	5	(England) Tamika Mkandawire	Leyton Orient	Free transfer	
25 June 2007	MF	6	(England) Rob Purdie	Darlington	Free transfer	
27 June 2007	FW	9	(England) Tim Sills	Torquay United	Undisclosed	
2 July 2007	FW	12	(England) Alan Connell	Brentford	Free transfer	
4 July 2007	DF	2	(England) Simon Travis	Nuneaton Borough	Free transfer	
5 July 2007	FW	16	(England) Andy Williams	Bristol Rovers	Undisclosed	
5 January 2008	MF	7	(England) Lionel Ainsworth	Watford	Undisclosed	

=== Loans in ===
Start date	End date	Pos.	No.	Player	From club	Ref.
8 August 2007	13 August 2007	GK	14	(England) Chris Weale	Bristol City	
10 August 2007	End of season	MF	20	(France) Toumani Diagouraga	Watford	
10 August 2007	End of season	FW	22	(Jamaica) Theo Robinson	Watford	
30 October 2007	End of season	DF	16	(England) Robbie Threlfall	Liverpool	
16 November 2007	End of season	DF	18	(England) Lee Collins	Wolverhampton Wanderers	
28 January 2008	30 April 2008	FW	29	(England) Gary Hooper	Southend United	
8 February 2008	10 February 2008	FW	24	(Netherlands) Sherjill MacDonald	West Bromwich Albion	
21 February 2008	24 March 2008	MF	26	(Republic of Ireland) Stephen Gleeson	Wolverhampton Wanderers	
27 March 2008	27 April 2008	MF	25	(England) Sammy Igoe	Bristol Rovers	

=== Loans out ===
Start date	End date	Pos.	No.	Player	To club	Ref.
22 November 2007	5 January 2008	MF	7	(England) Lionel Ainsworth	Watford	
25 February 2008	25 March 2008	FW	19	(England) Marcus Palmer	Gloucester City	
27 March 2008	27 April 2008	MF	17	(England) Jordan Fitzpatrick	Bromsgrove Rovers	
27 March 2008	27 April 2008	MF	27	(England) Craig Jones	Bromsgrove Rovers	

== Competitions ==
=== Overall record ===
Competition	First match	Last match	Starting round	Final position	Record							
Competition	First match	Last match	Starting round	Final position	Pld	W	D	L	GF	GA	GD	Win %
League Two	11 August 2007	3 May 2008	Matchday 1	3rd	46	26	10	10	72	41	+31	56.52
FA Cup	9 November 2007	27 January 2008	First round	Fourth round	6	3	2	1	7	4	+3	50.00
League Cup	14 August 2007	28 August 2007	First round	Second round	2	1	0	1	5	3	+2	50.00
Football League Trophy	9 October 2007		Second round	Second round	1	0	1	0	0	0	+0	0.00
Total					55	30	13	12	84	48	+36	54.55

Source: Football Club History Database

=== League Two ===
==== League table ====
Pos	Team	Pld	W	D	L	GF	GA	GD	Pts	Promotion or relegation
1	Milton Keynes Dons (C, P)	46	29	10	7	82	37	+45	97	Promotion to 2008–09 League One
2	Peterborough United (P)	46	28	8	10	84	43	+41	92	Promotion to 2008–09 League One
3	Hereford United (P)	46	26	10	10	72	41	+31	88	Promotion to 2008–09 League One
4	Stockport County (O, P)	46	24	10	12	72	54	+18	82	Qualification for League Two playoffs
5	Rochdale	46	23	11	12	77	54	+23	80	Qualification for League Two playoffs

Updated to match(es) played on 3 May 2008. Source: The Football League
Rules for classification: 1) points; 2) goal difference; 3) number of goals scored.
(C) Champions; (O) Play-off winners; (P) Promoted

==== Results summary ====
Overall								Home						Away					
Pld	W	D	L	GF	GA	GD	Pts	W	D	L	GF	GA	GD	W	D	L	GF	GA	GD
46	26	10	10	72	41	+31	88	11	6	6	34	19	+15	15	4	4	38	22	+16

Source: Football Web Pages

==== Results by round ====
Round	1	2	3	4	5	6	7	8	9	10	11	12	13	14	15	16	17	18	19	20	21	22	23	24	25	26	27	28	29	30	31	32	33	34	35	36	37	38	39	40	41	42	43	44	45	46
Ground	H	A	H	A	H	A	H	A	A	H	A	H	A	H	H	A	H	A	H	A	H	A	A	H	H	A	H	A	H	A	H	A	A	H	A	A	H	H	A	H	A	A	H	H	A	H
Result	D	W	D	W	L	W	W	L	W	W	D	L	D	W	W	W	D	D	W	W	L	W	W	D	W	L	L	W	W	W	W	W	L	L	W	W	W	D	L	D	W	D	L	W	W	W
Position	14	6	9	5	7	5	2	3	3	2	4	6	6	3	2	2	4	5	4	2	4	2	2	2	2	4	5	5	3	3	2	2	3	4	4	3	3	3	3	3	3	3	3	3	3	3
Points	1	4	5	8	8	11	14	14	17	20	21	21	22	25	28	31	32	33	36	39	39	42	45	46	49	49	49	52	55	58	61	64	64	64	67	70	73	74	74	75	78	79	79	82	85	88

Updated to match(es) played on 3 May 2008. Source: Football Web Pages
A = Away; H = Home; W = Win; D = Draw; L = Loss

==== Matches ====
Win Draw Loss

11 August 2007 1	Hereford United	0–0	Rotherham United	Hereford
15:00 BST		Report		Stadium: Edgar Street; Attendance: 3,566

18 August 2007 2	Barnet	1–2	Hereford United	Chipping Barnet
15:00 BST	Puncheon 13'; Devera (red card) 19'; Hendon (yellow card) 42'; Burton (yellow card) 71'; Hatch (yellow card) 90+2'	Report	Smith (yellow card) 15'; Benjamin 44' (pen.); Robinson 67'; Gwynne (yellow card) 90+4'; Guinan (yellow card) 90+6'	Stadium: Underhill Stadium; Attendance: 1,790; Referee: Gavin Ward

25 August 2007 3	Hereford United	1–1	Rochdale	Hereford
15:00 BST	Robinson 27'; McClenahan (yellow card) 29'; Diagouraga (yellow card) 39'; Brown (yellow card) 81'	Report	Dagnall 22' (pen.); Perkins (yellow card) 68' (yellow-red card) 86'; Murray (yellow card) 81'	Stadium: Edgar Street; Attendance: 2,732; Referee: Graham Horwood

1 September 2007 4	Wrexham	0–2	Hereford United	Wrexham
15:00 BST	Hope (yellow card) 54'; Done (yellow card) 90+3'	Report	Broadhurst (yellow card) 44'; Taylor 53'; Benjamin 74'; Rose (yellow card) 82'; Diagouraga (yellow card) 90'	Stadium: Racecourse Ground; Attendance: 4,004; Referee: Phil Dowd

8 September 2007 5	Hereford United	0–1	Macclesfield Town	Hereford
15:00 BST		Report	Regan (yellow card) 78'; Green 82'	Stadium: Edgar Street; Attendance: 2,725

15 September 2007 6	Morecambe	0–3	Hereford United	Morecambe
15:00 BST		Report	Broadhurst (yellow card) 14'; Benjamin 80'; Ainsworth 84'; Webb 90+4'	Stadium: Christie Park; Attendance: 2,949; Referee: Mark Haywood

22 September 2007 7	Hereford United	4–2	Bradford City	Hereford
15:00 BST	Diagouraga 15'; Guinan 18', (yellow card) 90'; Benjamin 52' (pen.); Beckwith (yellow card) 82'; Robinson 84'	Report	Ndumbu-Nsungu 30', 59'; Heckingbottom (yellow card) 51'	Stadium: Edgar Street; Attendance: 3,275; Referee: Roger East

29 September 2007 8	Grimsby Town	2–1	Hereford United	Cleethorpes
15:00 BST	Boshell 20'; Newey 52'; Bennett (yellow card) 88'	Report	Diagouraga (yellow card) 45+3'; Benjamin 56'	Stadium: Blundell Park; Attendance: 3,699; Referee: R. Lee

2 October 2007 9	Notts County	2–3	Hereford United	Nottingham
19:45 BST	Silk 64'; Sam 74'	Report	Smith 13'; Guinan 26', 70'	Stadium: Meadow Lane; Attendance: 3,576; Referee: Clive Penton

6 October 2007 10	Hereford United	2–0	Brentford	Hereford
15:00 BST	Webb 31', 34'; Beckwith (yellow card) 57'	Report	Connell (yellow card) 41'; Mackie (yellow card) 47'; Thorpe (yellow card) 49'; Heywood (yellow card) 71'; Mousinho (yellow card) 62'; O'Connor (yellow card) 90+2'	Stadium: Edgar Street; Attendance: 2,942; Referee: Darren Deadman

12 October 2007 11	Chester City	1–1	Hereford United	Chester
19:45 BST	Butler (yellow card) 44'; Yeo 58'	Report	Diagouraga 77'	Stadium: Deva Stadium; Attendance: 3,430; Referee: Clive Oliver

20 October 2007 12	Hereford United	0–1	Milton Keynes Dons	Hereford
15:00 BST	Guinan (red card) 45+4'	Report	Wright 87'	Stadium: Edgar Street; Attendance: 3,936; Referee: Paul Melin

27 October 2007 13	Peterborough United	1–1	Hereford United	Peterborough
15:00 BST	Mackail-Smith 43'; Howe (yellow card) 90+2'	Report	Webb (yellow card) 28'; Broadhurst (yellow card) 45+1'; Easton 72'; Robinson (yellow card) 90+4'	Stadium: London Road Stadium; Attendance: 5,008; Referee: Andy Hall

3 November 2007 14	Hereford United	5–1	Darlington	Hereford
15:00 GMT	Rose 4'; Robinson 22'; Smith 47'; Benjamin 58'; Easton 90+1'	Report	Colbeck 16'; Foster (yellow card) 71'	Stadium: Edgar Street; Attendance: 3,516; Referee: Mick Russell

6 November 2007 15	Hereford United	2–1	Mansfield Town	Hereford
19:45 GMT	Robinson 25'; Benjamin 48'; McCombe (yellow card) 68'	Report	Buxton (yellow card) 28'; Dawson (yellow card) 41'; Boulding 66'	Stadium: Edgar Street; Attendance: 2,272; Referee: Fred Graham

17 November 2007 16	Stockport County	2–3	Hereford United	Stockport
15:00 GMT	Elding 61' (pen.); Brown 83' (o.g.)	Report	Ainsworth 37', 54', 70'	Stadium: Edgeley Park; Attendance: 5,103; Referee: David Foster

24 November 2007 17	Hereford United	0–0	Accrington Stanley	Hereford
15:00 GMT		Report	Webb (yellow card) 75'; Roberts (yellow card) 82'	Stadium: Edgar Street; Attendance: 2,804; Referee: Trevor Kettle

4 December 2007 18	Wycombe Wanderers	2–2	Hereford United	High Wycombe
19:45 GMT	Oakes 6'; Holt 45+1'	Report	Robinson 86'; Johnson 89'	Stadium: Adams Park; Attendance: 4,801; Referee: Paul Armstrong

8 December 2007 19	Hereford United	3–1	Lincoln City	Hereford
15:00 GMT	Robinson 10' (pen.), (yellow card) 72'; McClenahan 44'; Smith 84'	Report	Croft (red card) 9'; Frecklington 21'; Kerr (yellow card) 69'	Stadium: Edgar Street; Attendance: 2,528; Referee: Danny McDermid

15 December 2007 20	Bury	0–1	Hereford United	Bury
15:00 GMT	Hurst (yellow card) 58'	Report	Robinson 90', (yellow card) 90+3'	Stadium: Gigg Lane; Attendance: 2,099; Referee: Jon Moss

22 December 2007 21	Hereford United	0–3	Morecambe	Hereford
15:00 GMT	Smith (yellow card) 25'	Report	Bentley 27'; Blinkhorn 38'; Hunter (yellow card) 57'; Artell 64'	Stadium: Edgar Street; Attendance: 3,058; Referee: Steve Bratt

26 December 2007 22	Macclesfield Town	0–1	Hereford United	Macclesfield
15:00 GMT	McIntyre (yellow card) 68'	Report	Robinson 57'; Beckwith (yellow card) 75'	Stadium: Moss Rose; Attendance: 2,393; Referee: Kevin Friend

29 December 2007 23	Bradford City	1–3	Hereford United	Bradford
15:00 GMT	Heckingbottom (yellow card) 10'; Clarke (yellow card) 42'; Wetherall 44'	Report	Robinson 17'; Beckwith 39'; Smith (yellow card) 42'; Benjamin 45+3'	Stadium: Valley Parade; Attendance: 13,640; Referee: Graham Laws

1 January 2008 24	Hereford United	0–0	Notts County	Hereford
15:00 GMT	Diagouraga (yellow card) 67'	Report	Parkinson (yellow card) 88'	Stadium: Edgar Street; Attendance: 3,945; Referee: Darren Drysdale

13 January 2008 25	Hereford United	3–1	Shrewsbury Town	Hereford
14:00 GMT	Benjamin 41' (pen.); Beckwith 73'; Johnson 79', (yellow card) 90+3'; Taylor (yellow card) 80'	Report	Briggs 31'; Herd (yellow card) 74'	Stadium: Edgar Street; Attendance: 4,707; Referee: Mark Haywood

21 January 2008 26	Chesterfield	4–0	Hereford United	Chesterfield
19:45 GMT	Lowry 2'; Lester 21', 40'; Moloney (yellow card) 65', (goal) 90+1'	Report		Stadium: Saltergate; Attendance: 3,274; Referee: Grant Hegley

30 January 2008 27	Hereford United	1–2	Barnet	Hereford
19:45 GMT	Benjamin 64'	Report	Adomah 52'; Nicolau 85'	Stadium: Edgar Street; Attendance: 2,271; Referee: Anthony Taylor

2 February 2008 28	Rotherham United	0–1	Hereford United	Rotherham
15:00 GMT	Brogan (yellow card) 18'	Report	Hooper 40'; Easton (yellow card) 83'	Stadium: Millmoor; Attendance: 4,746; Referee: Mike Jones

9 February 2008 29	Hereford United	4–1	Dagenham & Redbridge	Hereford
15:00 GMT	MacDonald 9', 67'; Hooper 21'; Johnson 45' (pen.)	Report	Strevens 33'; Saunders (yellow card) 45'	Stadium: Edgar Street; Attendance: 2,594; Referee: Rob Lewis

12 February 2008 30	Rochdale	2–4	Hereford United	Rochdale
19:45 GMT	Ramsden 7'; Howe 90+2'	Report	MacDonald 14', 21', 31'; Hooper 73'	Stadium: Spotland Stadium; Attendance: 2,884; Referee: Scott Mathieson

16 February 2008 31	Hereford United	2–0	Chesterfield	Hereford
15:00 GMT	MacDonald 8'; Hooper 45+2'	Report	Winter (yellow card) 69'	Stadium: Edgar Street; Attendance: 3,503; Referee: Anthony Bates

23 February 2008 32	Shrewsbury Town	1–2	Hereford United	Shrewsbury
15:00 GMT	Hall 6'; Constable (yellow card) 77'	Report	Johnson 27'; Beckwith (yellow card) 39'; Hooper 67'	Stadium: New Meadow; Attendance: 7,402; Referee: Uriah Rennie

26 February 2008 33	Dagenham & Redbridge	1–0	Hereford United	Dagenham
19:45 GMT	Foster 45'	Report	McCombe (yellow card) 84'	Stadium: Victoria Road; Attendance: 1,929

1 March 2008 34	Hereford United	0–1	Stockport County	Hereford
15:00 GMT	McCombe (yellow card) 53'	Report	Dickinson 54' (pen.), (yellow card) 58'	Stadium: Edgar Street; Attendance: 3,526; Referee: David Foster

8 March 2008 35	Accrington Stanley	0–2	Hereford United	Accrington
15:00 GMT	Thomas (yellow card) 39'	Report	Hooper 43'; Easton (yellow card) 50'; Roberts 52' (o.g.); Johnson (yellow card) 71'	Stadium: Crown Ground; Attendance: 1,262

11 March 2008 36	Mansfield Town	0–1	Hereford United	Mansfield
19:45 GMT	Mullins (yellow card) 24'; Baptiste (yellow card) 36'	Report	Easton 8'; Beckwith (yellow card) 47'	Stadium: Field Mill; Attendance: 1,606; Referee: Mike Thorpe

15 March 2008 37	Hereford United	1–0	Wycombe Wanderers	Hereford
15:00 GMT	Martin 72' (o.g.)	Report	Johnson (yellow card) 27'; Lennon (yellow card) 37'; Oakes (yellow card) 67'	Stadium: Edgar Street; Attendance: 3,126; Referee: Andy Woolmer

22 March 2008 38	Hereford United	0–0	Bury	Hereford
15:00 GMT		Report	Futcher (yellow card) 71'; Baker (yellow card) 90+2'	Stadium: Edgar Street; Attendance: 3,420; Referee: Gavin Ward

24 March 2008 39	Lincoln City	2–1	Hereford United	Lincoln
15:00 GMT	N'Guessan 31', 85' (pen.); Kerr (red card) 29'; Hone (yellow card) 34'	Report	Hooper 62'; Smith (yellow card) 65'; Easton (yellow card) 84'	Stadium: Sincil Bank; Attendance: 3,614; Referee: David Foster

5 April 2008 40	Hereford United	2–2	Chester City	Hereford
15:00 BST	Smith 25'; Hooper 35'; Rose (yellow card) 90+5'	Report	Sandwith 68'; Ellison (yellow card) 51', (goal) 90+4' (pen.)	Stadium: Edgar Street; Attendance: 3,210

12 April 2008 41	Darlington	0–1	Hereford United	Darlington
15:00 BST	Foster (yellow card) 74'; Valentine (yellow card) 89'	Report	Hooper 69'	Stadium: The Darlington Arena; Attendance: 4,331

15 April 2008 42	Milton Keynes Dons	0–0	Hereford United	Milton Keynes
19:45 BST		Report	Hooper (yellow card) 31'	Stadium: Stadium MK; Attendance: 11,428

19 April 2008 43	Hereford United	0–1	Peterborough United	Hereford
15:00 BST		Report	Keates 29'; Williams (yellow card) 34'	Stadium: Edgar Street; Attendance: 5,279; Referee: Mark Haywood

22 April 2008 44	Hereford United	2–0	Wrexham	Hereford
19:45 BST	Hooper 42'; Robinson 60'	Report	Murtagh (yellow card) 44'; Williams (yellow card) 82'	Stadium: Edgar Street; Attendance: 3,739; Referee: Keith Stroud

26 April 2008 45	Brentford	0–3	Hereford United	Brentford
15:00 BST		Report	Hooper 18'; Robinson 36'; Johnson 90+2'	Stadium: Griffin Park; Attendance: 6,246; Referee: Scott Mathieson

3 May 2008 46	Hereford United	2–0	Grimsby Town	Hereford
15:00 BST	Smith 36'; Robinson 42'	Report	Hegarty (yellow card) 27'	Stadium: Edgar Street; Attendance: 6,020; Referee: Neil Swarbrick

=== FA Cup ===
The draw for the first round was made on 31 October 2007, with Hereford being drawn at home to League One club Leeds United, playing at that level for the first time in their history. The match was moved to Friday night in order to be broadcast on terrestrial television, with Hereford earning a replay after a 0–0 draw. In the replay, a third minute goal from Lionel Ainsworth was enough to send Hereford through 1–0 and knock Leeds out. In the second round, Hereford were again drawn at home against a League One club, Hartlepool United. No replay was needed this time to defeat their higher graded opponents with Hereford winning 2–0. A third consecutive League One club was drawn in the third round, and a third consecutive scalp obtained by Hereford as they knocked Tranmere Rovers out, beating them 1–0 in a replay after a 2–2 draw at Prenton Park. In the fourth round, Hereford were drawn at home against Championship club, and eventual runners-up, Cardiff City. Hereford's cup run came to an end as they were beaten 2–1.

Win Draw Loss

9 November 2007 First round	Hereford United	0–0	Leeds United	Hereford
19:45 GMT		Report	Douglas (yellow card) 60'; Parker (yellow card) 70'	Stadium: Edgar Street; Attendance: 5,924; Referee: Anthony Bates

20 November 2007 Replay	Leeds United	0–1	Hereford United	Leeds
19:45 GMT	Hughes (yellow card) 28'; Heath (yellow card) 69'	Report	Ainsworth 3'	Stadium: Elland Road; Attendance: 11,315; Referee: Graham Laws

1 December 2007 Second round	Hereford United	2–0	Hartlepool United	Hereford
15:00 GMT	McCombe 45+2'; Beckwith (yellow card) 54'; Diagouraga (yellow card) 79'; Robinson 85'	Report	McCunnie (yellow card) 50'	Stadium: Edgar Street; Attendance: 3,801; Referee: Andy Hall

3 January 2008 Third round	Tranmere Rovers	2–2	Hereford United	Birkenhead
15:00 GMT	Jennings 75', (yellow card) 83'; Taylor 78'	Report	Smith 65'; Benjamin 76'	Stadium: Prenton Park; Attendance: 6,909; Referee: Nigel Miller

16 January 2008 Replay	Hereford United	1–0	Tranmere Rovers	Hereford
19:45 GMT	Johnson 72'	Report	Kay (yellow card) 67'	Stadium: Edgar Street; Attendance: 6,471; Referee: Richard Beeby

27 January 2008 Fourth round	Hereford United	1–2	Cardiff City	Hereford
12:30 GMT	Robinson 77', (yellow card) 90'	Report	Parry (yellow card) 14'; McNaughton 45+1'; Thompson 67' (pen.)	Stadium: Edgar Street; Attendance: 6,855; Referee: Andy D'Urso

=== League Cup ===
Win Draw Loss

14 August 2007 First round	Hereford United	4–1	Yeovil Town	Hereford
19:45 BST	Ainsworth 8', 24', 41'; Easton 35'; Johnson (yellow card) 88'	Report	Owusu 50'; Peltier (yellow card) 55'	Stadium: Edgar Street; Attendance: 2,085; Referee: Mike Jones

28 August 2007 Second round	Birmingham City	2–1	Hereford United	Birmingham
19:45 BST	O'Connor 27'; McSheffrey 38'	Report	Robinson (yellow card) 11', (goal) 74'; Broadhurst (yellow card) 59'	Stadium: St Andrew's; Attendance: 10,185; Referee: Martin Atkinson

=== Football League Trophy ===
Win Draw Loss

9 October 2007 Second round	Hereford United	0–0 (2–4 p)	Yeovil Town	Hereford
19:45 BST	Taylor (yellow card) 80'	Report	Lynch (yellow card) 50'	Stadium: Edgar Street; Attendance: 1,859; Referee: Steven Cook
	Penalties
	Benjamin (penalty missed); Beckwith (penalty missed); Robinson (penalty scored); Webb (penalty scored)		(penalty scored) Stewart; (penalty missed) Larrieu; (penalty scored) Barry; (penalty scored) Owusu; (penalty missed) Betsy; (penalty scored) Jones

=== Herefordshire Senior Cup ===
Date	Round	Opponents	H / A	Result	Scorers	Attendance
5 February 2008	Quarter Final	Ledbury Town	H	8 – 0	Palmer 40', 53', 71', 73', 87', Taylor 42', Burge 56', 60'	221
4 March 2008	Semi Final	Bromyard Town	H	5 – 0	Broadhurst 5', Robinson 17', 56', MacLeod 52', Thomas 90'	109
1 April 2008	Final	Westfields	N	3 – 0	Guinan 14', 46', Taylor 35'	281

== Squad statistics ==
As of match played 3 May 2008

=== Appearance and goals ===
- The plus (+) symbol denotes an appearance as a substitute, hence 2+1 indicates two appearances in the starting XI and one appearance as a substitute
- Players with zero appearances are not included
- Statistics from the HFA Senior Floodlit Cup are not included

No.	Pos	Nat	Player	Total		League Two		FA Cup		League Cup		FL Trophy	
No.	Pos	Nat	Player	Apps	Goals	Apps	Goals	Apps	Goals	Apps	Goals	Apps	Goals
1	GK	(England) ENG	Wayne Brown	52	0	44	0	6	0	2	0	0	0
2	DF	(Australia) AUS	Trent McClenahan	45	1	38	1	3+1	0	2	0	1	0
4	DF	(England) ENG	Richard Rose	39	1	31	1	4+1	0	2	0	1	0
5	DF	(England) ENG	John McCombe	32	1	23+4	0	3+1	1	0	0	1	0
6	DF	(England) ENG	Karl Broadhurst	26	0	22+1	0	1	0	2	0	0	0
8	MF	(England) ENG	Ben Smith	53	6	42+2	5	6	1	2	0	0+1	0
9	FW	(England) ENG	Steve Guinan	32	3	20+8	3	0+2	0	0+2	0	0	0
10	MF	(England) ENG	Kris Taylor	40	1	22+9	1	4+2	0	0+2	0	1	0
11	MF	(England) ENG	Clint Easton	45	4	36+3	3	2+1	0	2	1	1	0
12	FW	(Jamaica) JAM	Trevor Benjamin	43	11	15+19	10	6	1	2	0	1	0
14	GK	(Northern Ireland) NIR	Michael Ingham	1	0	0	0	0	0	0	0	1	0
15	MF	(England) ENG	Sam Gwynne	19	0	9+6	0	2+1	0	0	0	0+1	0
16	DF	(England) ENG	Robbie Threlfall	12	0	6+3	0	3	0	0	0	0	0
18	DF	(England) ENG	Lee Collins	20	0	14+2	0	4	0	0	0	0	0
19	FW	(England) ENG	Marcus Palmer	1	0	0+1	0	0	0	0	0	0	0
20	MF	(France) FRA	Toumani Diagouraga	50	2	41	2	6	0	2	0	1	0
21	MF	(England) ENG	Luke Webb	15	3	3+11	3	0	0	0	0	1	0
22	FW	(Jamaica) JAM	Theo Robinson	52	16	32+11	13	6	2	2	1	0+1	0
23	FW	(England) ENG	Simon Johnson	39	6	22+11	5	3+1	1	0+1	0	1	0
28	DF	(England) ENG	Dean Beckwith	46	2	38	2	5	0	2	0	1	0
33	GK	(Scotland) SCO	Ryan Esson	1	0	1	0	0	0	0	0	0	0
Players who left during the season but made an appearance
7	MF	(England) ENG	Lionel Ainsworth	19	8	13+2	4	2	1	2	3	0	0
14	GK	(England) ENG	Chris Weale	1	0	1	0	0	0	0	0	0	0
24	FW	(Netherlands) NED	Sherjill MacDonald	7	6	7	6	0	0	0	0	0	0
25	MF	(England) ENG	Sammy Igoe	4	0	4	0	0	0	0	0	0	0
26	MF	(Republic of Ireland) IRL	Stephen Gleeson	4	0	3+1	0	0	0	0	0	0	0
29	FW	(England) ENG	Gary Hooper	19	11	19	11	0	0	0	0	0	0
