= Ben Smith (footballer, born 1978) =

English footballer

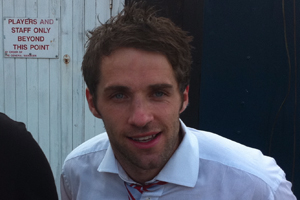

Personal information
- Full name: Benjamin Peter Smith
- Date of birth: 23 November 1978 (age 47)
- Place of birth: Chelmsford, England
- Height: 5 ft 9 in (1.75 m)
- Position: Midfielder

Youth career
- Arsenal

Senior career*
Years	Team	Apps	(Gls)
1995–1996	Arsenal	0	(0)
1996–1998	Reading	1	(0)
1998–2001	Yeovil Town	113	(15)
2001–2002	Southend United	1	(0)
2002–2004	Hereford United	52	(18)
2004–2006	Shrewsbury Town	24	(4)
2006–2007	Weymouth	44	(13)
2007–2009	Hereford United	99	(7)
2009–2012	Crawley Town	68	(12)
2011	→ Kettering Town (loan)	3	(0)
2011	→ Woking (loan)	4	(1)
2012	→ Aldershot Town (loan)	8	(0)
2012	A.F.C. Sudbury		
2012–2014	Thurrock		
2014	Maldon & Tiptree		
Total		417	(70)
- * Club domestic league appearances and goals

Benjamin Peter "Ben" Smith (born 23 November 1978) is an English former footballer who played as a midfielder.

== Career ==
Born in Chelmsford, Smith began his career at Arsenal where he signed his first professional contract for the 1995–96 season. He never made a first team appearance at the London-based club, although he made 29 appearances and scored four goals for the youth team during that season.

He moved to Reading in 1996 and made his senior debut on the final day of the 1996–97 season, coming on as a substitute in a 3–2 away defeat at Manchester City. This turned out to be his only first team appearance for the Royals and he moved to Yeovil Town in March 1998.

Despite being transfer listed in his second season, remained with the club until 2001. Smith had played a key role in Yeovil's challenge for promotion to the Football League, but an agreed new contract offer was withdrawn when manager Colin Addison was sacked. Smith moved to Southend United on a free transfer, joining his former manager David Webb.

He struggled to make an impact in his solitary season at Roots Hall and left for Hereford United, for whom he made 52 league appearances and scored 18 goals in a two-season-long spell. An injury to his shoulder meant he required an operation in March 2004, shortly before joining Shrewsbury Town. He made 24 league appearances for the Shropshire club. He joined Weymouth in January 2006, playing a significant role in the run in to the Conference South championship.

Weymouth's first Conference match in 17 years saw Smith score the opening goal, in the first minute against Tamworth. He went on to play in every first team match for the Terras up until the turn of the year, when he scored twice in a 3–2 defeat to Forest Green which turned out to be his last match for the club. The entire Weymouth squad had been transfer listed, due to financial problems, even though Smith had only recently signed a contract extension until 2009. Five league clubs expressed an interest in signing the Weymouth captain, and on 25 January 2007, Weymouth confirmed that he had rejoined Hereford United for £20,000 on a 2 1/2-year contract. This was the first transfer fee that the Bulls had paid since the signing of Neil Grayson in 1997.

Smith made an impact on his return to Edgar Street against Notts County, hitting the post in the buildup to the first goal and providing the assist for the second goal. He went on to play in all Hereford's remaining matches of the 2006–07 season, scoring at home to Barnet in the process. He also wore the captain's armband in many of the matches.

Smith started the vast majority of Hereford's matches in the 2007–08 season as the Bulls gained promotion to Football League One. He was also a regular fixture throughout the following campaign as the Bulls were relegated back to The Football League's basement division. During his two and a half-year stay at Edgar Street, Smith featured in ninety-nine league games, notching seven times.

Despite featuring regularly for Hereford United, Smith departed the club in the summer of 2009. Along with former Hereford teammate Karl Broadhurst, Smith signed for Crawley Town on a one-year contract. Smith was an influential figure during his first season at Crawley, featuring in thirty-four league matches, and scoring seven times, making him the club's joint-second highest goalscorer for the season. Smith agreed terms to spend a second season with the club.

In the 2010–11 season, Crawley were promoted to League Two, the fourth tier of English football, for the first time in their history after winning the Conference Premier with a record 105 points. The club also reached the fifth round of the FA Cup where they lost 1–0 to Premier League club Manchester United – a match in which Smith played. He made 35 appearances for Crawley across the 2010–11 season and scored 6 goals.

In September 2011, Smith joined Kettering Town on a one-month loan. He made 3 appearances for Kettering Town. In November 2011, he joined Woking on loan. He scored once in 4 appearances for Woking. On 31 January 2012, Smith joined Aldershot Town on loan until the end of the season. He made 8 appearances for Aldershot Town. Crawley achieved their second consecutive promotion to League One at the end of the 2011–12 season after finishing third in League Two. He scored played 5 times for the club across the 2011–12 season. In May 2012, Smith was released by Crawley after being deemed surplus to requirements.

He joined A.F.C. Sudbury on a one-year deal on 15 August 2012, however he played only eight games before being released on 25 September 2012. On 11 October he signed for Thurrock in the Conference South. He suffered an injury in November 2013, and in early January 2014 was released. In the middle of January he signed for Maldon & Tiptree, but left he club soon afterwards.

After leaving the game, Smith worked as a teacher at Maltings Academy in Essex, having earned himself a degree in business management. Now living in West Sussex, he published a book Journeyman: One man's odyssey through the lower leagues of English football.

== Career statistics ==
Appearances and goals by club, season and competition
Club	Season	League			FA Cup		League Cup		Other		Total	
Club	Season	Division	Apps	Goals	Apps	Goals	Apps	Goals	Apps	Goals	Apps	Goals
Reading	1996–97	First Division	1	0	0	0	0	0	0	0	1	0
Reading	1997–98	First Division	0	0	0	0	0	0	0	0	0	0
Reading	Total		1	0	0	0	0	0	0	0	1	0
Yeovil Town	1997–98	Football Conference	14	5	0	0	—		0	0	14	5
Yeovil Town	1998–99	Football Conference	31	2	5	0	—		3	0	39	2
Yeovil Town	1999–2000	Football Conference	36	4	2	0	—		6	0	44	4
Yeovil Town	2000–01	Football Conference	32	4	5	0	—		7	1	44	5
Yeovil Town	Total		113	15	12	0	0	0	16	1	141	16
Southend United	2001–02	Third Division	1	0	0	0	0	0	0	0	1	0
Hereford United	2002–03	Football Conference	24	5	0	0	—		1	1	25	6
Hereford United	2003–04	Football Conference	28	13	2	1	—		1	0	32	14
Hereford United	Total		52	18	2	1	0	0	2	1	57	20
Shrewsbury Town	2004–05	League Two	12	3	0	0	1	0	1 (Note: Appearance(s) in Football League Trophy)	0	14	3
Shrewsbury Town	2005–06	League Two	12	1	2	0	2	0	0	0	16	1
Shrewsbury Town	Total		24	4	2	0	3	0	1	0	30	4
Weymouth	2005–06	Conference South	19	3	0	0	—		0	0	19	3
Weymouth	2006–07	Conference National	24	10	2	0	—		0	0	26	10
Weymouth	Total		43	13	2	0	0	0	0	0	45	13
Hereford United	2006–07	League Two	18	1	0	0	0	0	0	0	18	1
Hereford United	2007–08	League Two	44	5	6	1	2	0	1	0	53	6
Hereford United	2008–09	League One	37	1	2	0	1	0	0	0	40	1
Hereford United	Total		99	7	8	1	3	0	1	0	111	8
Crawley Town	2009–10	Conference National	34	7	0	0	—		0	0	34	7
Crawley Town	2010–11	Conference National	29	4	6	2	—		0	0	35	6
Crawley Town	2011–12	League Two	5	1	0	0	1	0	1	0	7	1
Crawley Town	Total		68	12	6	2	1	0	1	0	81	15
Kettering Town (loan)	2011–12	Conference National	3	0	0	0	—		0	0	3	0
Woking (loan)	2011–12	Conference South	4	1	0	0	—		0	0	4	1
Aldershot Town (loan)	2011–12	League Two	8	0	0	0	0	0	0	0	8	0
Career total			416	70	31	4	7	0	22	2	476	76

== Honours ==
Crawley Town

- Conference National: 2010–11
- Football League Two third-place promotion: 2011–12
