= Lionel Ainsworth =

English footballer

Personal information
- Full name: Lionel Glenn Robert Ainsworth
- Date of birth: 1 October 1987 (age 39)
- Place of birth: Derby, England
- Height: 5 ft 5 in (1.65 m)
- Position: Winger

Team information
- Current team: Aveley

Youth career
- –2005: Derby County

Senior career*
Years	Team	Apps	(Gls)
2006–2007	Derby County	2	(0)
2006	→ AFC Bournemouth (loan)	7	(0)
2007	→ Halifax Town (loan)	2	(1)
2007	→ Wycombe Wanderers (loan)	7	(0)
2007–2008	Hereford United	15	(4)
2007–2008	→ Watford (loan)	2	(0)
2008–2009	Watford	13	(0)
2008–2009	→ Hereford United (loan)	7	(3)
2009–2010	Huddersfield Town	25	(0)
2010	→ Brentford (loan)	9	(0)
2010–2012	Shrewsbury Town	54	(11)
2012	→ Burton Albion (loan)	7	(0)
2012–2014	Rotherham United	16	(0)
2013	→ Aldershot Town (loan)	7	(0)
2013–2014	→ Motherwell (loan)	29	(11)
2014–2017	Motherwell	93	(12)
2017–2019	Plymouth Argyle	20	(0)
2019	Weymouth	6	(1)
2019–2020	Dulwich Hamlet	14	(3)
2020–2021	Welling United	10	(1)
2021	Braintree Town	1	(0)
2021–2022	Heybridge Swifts	33	(16)
2022–2023	AFC Sudbury	22	(3)
2023–	Aveley	0	(0)

International career
2003	England U16	2	(0)
2003	England U17	1	(0)
2004	England U18	1	(0)
2006	England U19	1	(0)

Managerial career
- 2023–: Aveley (assistant)
- * Club domestic league appearances and goals as of 14:40, 6 May 2022 (UTC)

Lionel Glenn Robert Ainsworth (born 1 October 1987) is an English footballer who plays for Aveley as a right winger. He has previously played for multiple Football League and non-league clubs as well as in the Scottish Premiership. He was capped at youth level by England, featuring for England U19 after joining the Derby senior squad.

== Career ==
=== Derby County ===
Ainsworth was born in Derby and started his career at Derby County, signing his first professional contract on 4 August 2005. He made his first team debut on 25 February 2006 in a 1–0 home win over Plymouth Argyle, coming on as a late substitute for Kevin Lisbie. His second and final first team appearance for Derby came in a 5–0 defeat to Reading on 1 April 2006, again as a substitute.

Ainsworth spent the first four months of the 2006–07 season on loan at League One side AFC Bournemouth, but made only nine appearances. In January 2007, he joined Conference side Halifax Town for a month, scoring his first senior goal on his debut against York City. Soon after his return to Derby, he joined League Two side Wycombe Wanderers on loan until the end of the season, where he made seven appearances before being recalled in April.

=== Hereford United ===
He was released by Derby at the end of the 2006–07 season and was signed by Hereford United, who were about to start their second season back in the Football League. He quickly established his place in the side and featured in every first team match bar one, during his time with the Bulls. In only his second match he scored his first senior hat-trick in a 4–1 League Cup first round win over Yeovil Town. He went on to score another hat-trick, this time in a 3–2 league win at Stockport County. Ainsworth's last match for Hereford saw him score a 3rd-minute winner against Leeds United, in the FA Cup first round.

=== Watford ===
Ainsworth's performances for Hereford saw Watford sign him initially on loan, with Watford manager Aidy Boothroyd extending the loans of Toumani Diagouraga and Theo Robinson to Hereford until the end of the season as part of the transfer deal. He also gave Hereford first option on Diagouraga, which the Bulls duly utilised in the summer of 2008. On 5 January 2008, Ainsworth signed for Watford permanently for an undisclosed six figure fee, agreeing a contract until the end of the 2009–10 season.

On 16 November 2008, Watford caretaker manager Malky Mackay named Ainsworth as one of three players that were to be loaned to other clubs to gain match fitness. Four days later Ainsworth rejoined Hereford United on a month's loan, on the anniversary of his final match for the Bulls. He scored three more goals for United in the 2008–09 season including a brace and two assists against Oldham Athletic in a 5–0 hammering. Following that performance, Ainsworth was recalled to Watford with one game still left on his loan deal.

=== Huddersfield Town ===
On 23 January 2009, Ainsworth was signed by Football League One side Huddersfield Town on a two-and-a-half-year contract. His debut came as a substitute for Keigan Parker in the 1–0 defeat by Yeovil Town at Huish Park on 27 January 2009. His first start for the Terriers came in the 1–0 win over Peterborough United on 31 January 2009.

After a period of being left out of the side altogether, Ainsworth moved on loan to fellow League One side Brentford on 27 January 2010. He made his debut in the 4–0 win over Gillingham at Griffin Park on 6 February 2010. After making his first start for the Bees, against Yeovil in April 2010, he got in trouble with the club's manager Andy Scott, having gone straight down the tunnel after being substituted. Afterwards Scott said that Ainsworth wouldn't play for the club again for showing disrespect to the club and its fans, and he was sent back to Huddersfield.

A season of mixed fortunes led to Ainsworth looking for a transfer away from Huddersfield. Rival clubs Shrewsbury Town & Hereford United were rumoured to be interested in him. At a fans forum on 21 July 2010 Hereford's manager Simon Davey confirmed he had made an approach to Huddersfield.

=== Shrewsbury Town ===
Ainsworth signed a two-year deal with Shrewsbury Town during the 2010–11 pre-season on a free transfer, with Huddersfield gaining 20% of any future sell on fee by Shrewsbury. He made his league debut for Shrewsbury Town on 7 August 2010, with a man of the match performance in a 3–1 victory against Bradford City on the opening day of the 2010–11 season. He scored his first goal for Shrewsbury Town against Rotherham United on 4 September 2010, the only goal of the game in a 1–0 win at the Greenhous Meadow. Ainsworth got his first hat-trick for Shrewsbury Town in a 5–1 win against Lincoln City on Tuesday 8 February 2011. He finished the season with 9 goals, the majority from the wing.

At the beginning of the 2011–12 season, Ainsworth played a big part in Shrewsbury's League Cup wins against former club Derby County and Premier League club Swansea City to set up a third round clash with Arsenal. On 6 March 2012, Ainsworth joined fellow Football League Two side Burton Albion on a one-month loan deal. In May 2012, Ainsworth was released by Shrewsbury after being told his contract would not be renewed.

=== Rotherham United ===
Ainsworth signed for Rotherham United on 18 June 2012. He scored his first goal for the club on his debut on 11 August 2012, in a League Cup game against Hull City, in which Rotherham lost 7–6 on penalties after drawing 1–1 against the Championship side. He made his league début on 18 August, in a 3–0 win against Burton Albion in the club's first ever competitive game at the New York Stadium.

On 21 January 2013, Ainsworth signed for Aldershot Town on loan.

=== Motherwell ===
On 29 August 2013, Ainsworth signed on loan for Motherwell until January 2014. He scored his first goal on his second appearance for Motherwell against Dundee United on 22 September 2013. On 3 January 2014, after four goals in four appearances, Ainsworth's loan was extended to the end of the season.

On 16 June 2014, Ainsworth signed for Motherwell permanently on a one-year deal. In the UEFA Europa League second qualifying round second leg match away against Stjarnan, Ainsworth scored his first European goal, but Motherwell lost 3–2, being eliminated 5–4 on aggregate. In May 2015, Ainsworth scored in both legs as Motherwell defeated Rangers 6–1 on aggregate in the Scottish Premiership Play-off Final to retain their place in the top flight. Following an incident at the final whistle of the second leg involving Motherwell's Lee Erwin and Fraser Kerr and Rangers' Bilel Mohsni which saw Kerr and Mohsni given red cards, two days later Ainsworth along with teammate Craig Moore received a two-match ban for his part in the incident.

On 24 June 2015, Ainsworth signed a new two-year contract with Motherwell.

=== Plymouth Argyle ===
On 30 May 2017, Ainsworth signed for Plymouth Argyle after turning down the offer of a new contract from Motherwell.

He had an unsuccessful trial with Scottish side Livingston in December 2018, before eventually being released by Plymouth Argyle at the end of the 2018–19 season.

=== Non-league spells ===
In August 2019, Ainsworth dropped down two divisions to join National League South side Weymouth, which had been newly promoted. He made his debut for the club as a second-half substitute in a 1–1 draw at Tonbridge Angels on 31 August.

Following a brief spell with Weymouth, Ainsworth went onto feature for the likes of Dulwich Hamlet, Welling United, Braintree Town and Heybridge Swifts before ultimately joining AFC Sudbury in July 2022.

On 19 June 2023, Ainsworth agreed to join Aveley following their promotion to the National League South, joining the club in a player/assistant manager capacity.

== International career ==
Ainsworth has represented England at youth level playing for the England U-17 and England U-18 sides. Ainsworth received his first call up for the England U-19 team shortly after breaking into the first team at Derby County.

== Career statistics ==
As of match played on 22 April 2023

Appearances and goals by club, season and competition
Club	Season	League			National Cup (Note: Includes appearances in FA Cup, Scottish Cup)		League Cup (Note: Includes appearances in League Cup, Scottish League Cup)		Other		Total	
Club	Season	Division	Apps	Goals	Apps	Goals	Apps	Goals	Apps	Goals	Apps	Goals
Derby County	2005–06	Championship	2	0	0	0	0	0	—		2	0
Derby County	2006–07	Championship	0	0	0	0	0	0	0	0	0	0
Derby County	Total		2	0	0	0	0	0	0	0	2	0
AFC Bournemouth (loan)	2006–07	League One	7	0	1	0	0	0	1 (Note: Appearance(s) in the Football League Trophy)	0	9	0
Halifax Town (loan)	2006–07	Conference National	2	1	—		—		—		2	1
Wycombe Wanderers (loan)	2006–07	League Two	7	0	—		—		—		7	0
Hereford United	2007–08	League Two	15	4	2	1	2	3	0	0	19	8
Watford	2007–08 (Note: Ainsworth initially signed on loan and played two matches for Watford, before he signed permanently on 5 January 2008)	Championship	8	0	—		—		2 (Note: Appearances in the Championship play-offs)	0	10	0
Watford	2008–09	Championship	7	0	0	0	3	0	—		10	0
Watford	Total		15	0	0	0	3	0	2	0	20	0
Hereford United (loan)	2008–09	League One	7	3	—		—		—		7	3
Huddersfield Town	2008–09	League One	14	0	—		—		—		14	0
Huddersfield Town	2009–10	League One	11	0	2	0	2	0	2	0	17	0
Huddersfield Town	Total		25	0	2	0	2	0	2	0	31	0
Brentford (loan)	2009–10	League One	9	0	—		—		—		9	0
Shrewsbury Town	2010–11	League Two	33	9	1	0	1	0	2 (Note: Appearances in the League Two play-offs)	0	37	9
Shrewsbury Town	2011–12	League Two	21	2	2	0	3	0	1	0	27	2
Shrewsbury Town	Total		54	11	3	0	4	0	3	0	64	11
Burton Albion (loan)	2011–12	League Two	7	0	—		—		—		7	0
Rotherham United	2012–13	League Two	16	0	0	0	1	1	1	0	18	1
Rotherham United	2013–14	League One	0	0	0	0	0	0	0	0	0	0
Rotherham United	Total		16	0	0	0	1	1	1	0	18	1
Aldershot Town (loan)	2012–13	League Two	7	0	—		—		—		7	0
Motherwell (loan)	2013–14	Scottish Premiership	29	11	0	0	2	0	—		31	11
Motherwell	2014–15	Scottish Premiership	34	6	0	0	1	0	4 (Note: Two appearances and a goal in the Europa League, two appearances and two goals in the Scottish Premiership play-offs)	3	39	9
Motherwell	2015–16	Scottish Premiership	29	2	2	0	2	1	—		33	3
Motherwell	2016–17	Scottish Premiership	30	4	0	0	5	0	—		35	4
Motherwell	Total		93	12	2	0	8	1	4	3	107	16
Plymouth Argyle	2017–18	League One	19	0	2	0	1	0	2 (Note: Appearance(s) in the EFL Trophy)	0	24	0
Plymouth Argyle	2018–19	League One	1	0	0	0	0	0	1	0	2	0
Plymouth Argyle	Total		20	0	2	0	1	0	3	0	26	0
Weymouth	2019–20	National League South	6	1	2	0	—		0	0	8	1
Dulwich Hamlet	2019–20	National League South	14	3	—		—		4 (Note: Three appearances in FA Trophy, one appearance in London Senior Cup)	0	18	3
Welling United	2020–21	National League South	10	1	1	0	—		1 (Note: Appearance in FA Trophy)	0	12	1
Braintree Town	2021–22	National League South	1	0	0	0	—		0	0	1	0
Heybridge Swifts	2021–22	Isthmian League North Division	33	16	—		—		2	1	35	17
AFC Sudbury	2022–23	Isthmian League North Division	22	3	6	0	—		0	0	28	3
Aveley	2023–24	National League South	0	0	0	0	—		0	0	0	0
Career total			401	67	21	1	23	5	23	4	468	76
