= Theo Robinson =

English football player (born 1989)

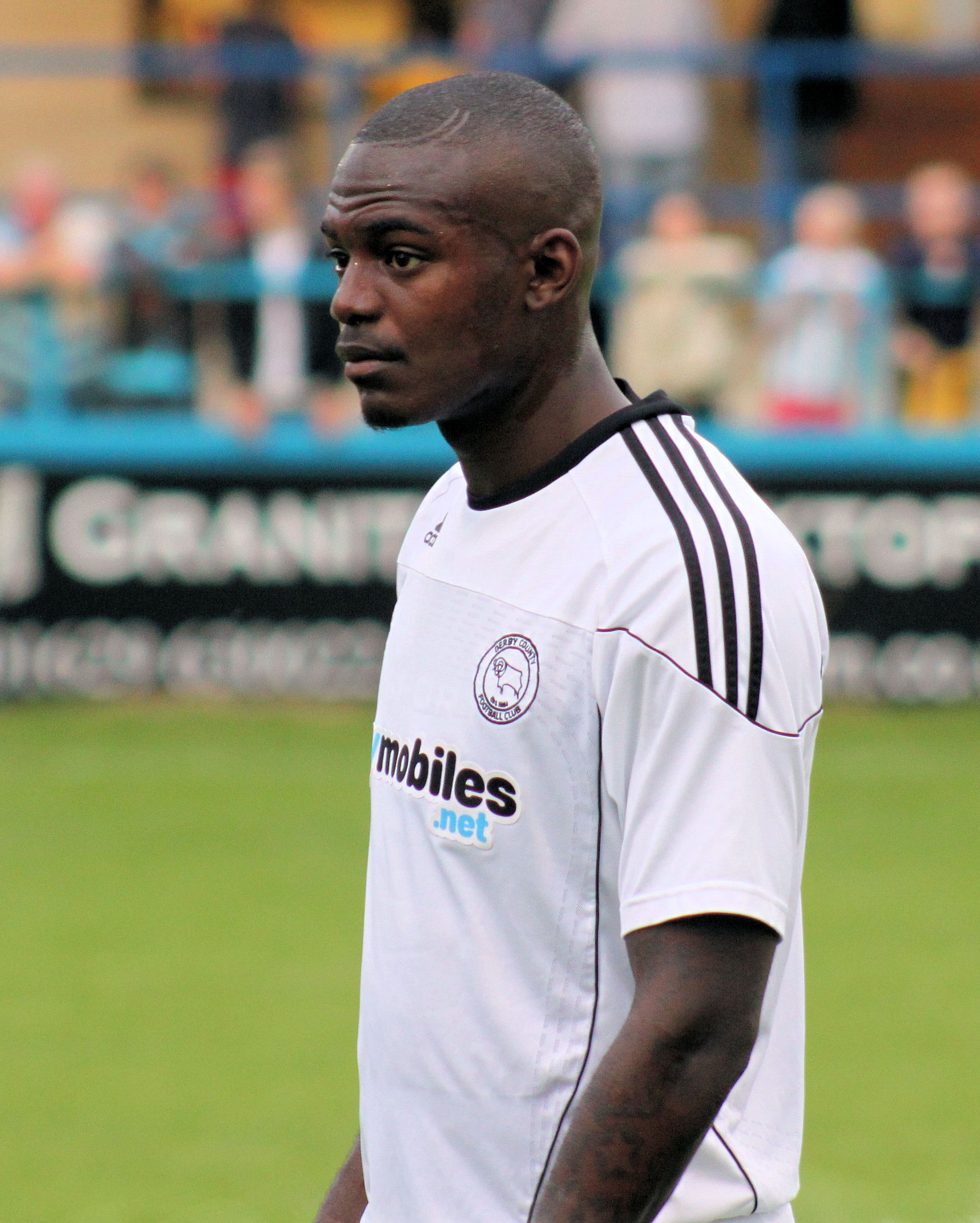
- Robinson with Derby County in 2011

Personal information
- Full name: Theo Larayan Ronaldo Shadiki Robinson
- Date of birth: 22 January 1989 (age 37)
- Place of birth: Birmingham, England
- Height: 5 ft 11 in (1.80 m)
- Position: Striker

Team information
- Current team: Bromsgrove Sporting
- Number: 10

Youth career
- 2004–2005: Stoke City
- 2005–2006: Watford

Senior career*
Years	Team	Apps	(Gls)
2006–2009	Watford	5	(0)
2007	→ Wealdstone (loan)		
2007–2008	→ Hereford United (loan)	43	(13)
2009	→ Southend United (loan)	21	(7)
2009–2011	Huddersfield Town	38	(13)
2010	→ Millwall (loan)	7	(2)
2011	Millwall	4	(1)
2011	→ Derby County (loan)	13	(2)
2011–2013	Derby County	67	(18)
2013	→ Huddersfield Town (loan)	6	(0)
2013–2015	Doncaster Rovers	63	(12)
2015	→ Scunthorpe United (loan)	8	(3)
2015–2016	Motherwell	10	(0)
2016	Port Vale	14	(2)
2016–2017	Lincoln City	14	(1)
2017–2020	Southend United	70	(11)
2019	→ Swindon Town (loan)	16	(7)
2019–2020	→ Colchester United (loan)	28	(11)
2020–2021	Port Vale	29	(3)
2021–2022	Bradford City	23	(2)
2022	Hartlepool United	6	(0)
2023	Brackley Town	11	(1)
2024	Gloucester City	17	(7)
2024–	Bromsgrove Sporting	54	(13)

International career
2013	Jamaica	7	(0)
- * Club domestic league appearances and goals as of 17:58, 5 May 2026 (UTC)

Theo Larayan Ronaldo Shadiki Robinson (born 22 January 1989) is a footballer who plays as a striker for Southern League Premier Division Central club Bromsgrove Sporting.

Born in England, he won seven caps for Jamaica in 2013. He began his career at Watford, making his debut in the English Football League in April 2006 and his debut in the Premier League in May 2007. He was loaned out to Southern League side Wealdstone in 2007, and then League Two side Hereford United, and scored 16 goals in 52 appearances to help Hereford win promotion in the 2007–08 season. He spent the 2008–09 season on loan at Southend United and was sold to Huddersfield Town in July 2009. He was loaned out to Millwall in September 2010 and joined the club permanently in January 2011. The following month, he was loaned out to Derby County and joined the club permanently in the summer. He rejoined Huddersfield Town on loan in February 2013 and was sold to Doncaster Rovers in August 2013. He joined Scunthorpe United on loan in March 2015.

Robinson signed with Scottish Premiership side Motherwell in August 2015 and moved on to Port Vale in January 2016, and then Lincoln City in October 2016. He was sold to Southend United in January 2017 and then loaned out to Swindon Town 12 months later. He was loaned to Colchester United in August 2019. He rejoined Port Vale in August 2020, where he would remain for 12 months before switching to Bradford City. Robinson later played for Hartlepool United, Brackley Town, Gloucester City and Bromsgrove Sporting.

== Club career ==
=== Watford ===
Robinson was born in Birmingham, West Midlands. He spent one season as a schoolboy at the Stoke City Academy before being released at the age of 16. He took part at an exit trial held by the English Football League at Derby County's Moor Farm training ground in 2005, where he was spotted by Watford, and signed on a two-year apprenticeship having impressed during a subsequent week's training at the club. He made his first-team debut against Queens Park Rangers on 22 April 2006, coming on as a half-time substitute for Darius Henderson in a 2–1 victory at Loftus Road.

In February 2007, he went on a one-month loan to Southern Football League Premier Division club Wealdstone. Robinson made his Premier League debut as a late substitute in Watford's final game of the 2006–07 season, a 1–1 draw with Newcastle United at Vicarage Road on 13 May.

In August 2007, Robinson joined League Two side Hereford United on a four-month loan, alongside teammate Toumani Diagouraga. He scored his first goal in the Football League on 18 August, in a 2–1 win at Barnet. Manager Graham Turner compared him to a young Steve Bull, saying that "he's very lively, he's got pace, and gets himself into good positions." Robinson finished the season as top goalscorer for Hereford with 16 goals in all competitions as they achieved promotion in third-place. With Darius Henderson suspended, Watford manager Aidy Boothroyd was hoping to use Robinson in the Championship play-offs, but confirmed that he was unable to do so due to the terms of Robinson's loan deal at Hereford.

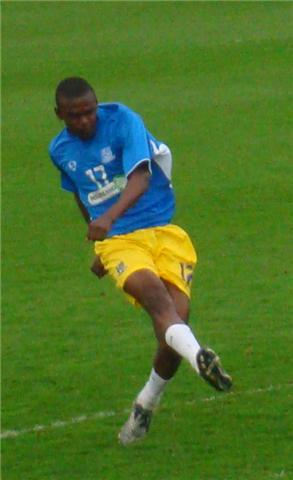
Robinson playing for Southend United

Robinson made four appearances for Watford in the 2008–09 season, but was not in new manager Brendan Rodgers's first-team plan's, who replaced Boothroyd as manager in November. On 24 January 2009, Robinson joined League One side Southend United on loan until the end of the 2008–09 season. He formed an effective strike partnership with Lee Barnard and impressed manager Steve Tilson with his performances. Tilson made a bid for Robinson at the end of the season. Though Rodgers left Watford and was succeeded by Malky Mackay, Robinson had already decided to leave the club.

=== Huddersfield Town ===
In July 2009, Robinson signed for League One club Huddersfield Town on a three-year deal for an undisclosed fee. He chose Huddersfield ahead of several other clubs, including Swindon Town, who had a "verbal agreement" to sign Robinson from Watford for £275,000 according to manager Danny Wilson. Swindon chairman Andrew Fitton stated that "We agreed a deal with the club and player but there are shenanigans going on that we have warned certain people about. This is a classic example of agents and greed." On 26 August, he scored two goals in a 4–3 League Cup defeat to Newcastle United at St James' Park. He began the season in a strike partnership with Jordan Rhodes before being dropped fin favour of Lee Novak. He ended the 2009–10 season with 16 goals in 43 appearances.

He was linked with a move away from Huddersfield in June 2010, but manager Lee Clark said that the rumours did not come from the Galpharm Stadium and that "it seems as though someone is trying to orchestrate a move."

=== Millwall ===
On 8 September 2010, after falling down the pecking order at Huddersfield, Robinson moved to Millwall on a 93-day emergency loan. He returned to Huddersfield in early November through injury, with the need for an operation on his knee, cutting his loan spell short. He joined Millwall on a two-and-a-half-year deal for an undisclosed fee in January 2011. Manager Kenny Jackett said that Robinson would want to prove Huddersfield wrong, and therefore have a hunger to perform at The Den.

=== Derby County ===
In February 2011, Robinson signed a three-month loan deal at Championship club Derby County, with a view to a permanent move. Robinson scored twice in 13 games during this loan spell. He impressed manager Nigel Clough, who told BBC Radio Derby that "hopefully Theo will be here next season as well, as one of five or six strikers." He joined Derby on a two-year contract after his contract with Millwall ended in the summer.

He was Derby's second top-scorer with three goals in six league starts, and scored a brace in Derby's 3–2 defeat at Peterborough United, taking his tally for the season up to six, making him the club's top-scorer. Robinson finished the 2011–12 season with 12 goals in all competitions and joint top-scorer with Steve Davies.

The club reprimanded Robinson after he broke club rules by posting on Twitter that he was dropped from the matchday squad before the team was announced for the game at Bolton Wanderers on 21 August 2012. Four days later, Robinson came off the bench to score a last-minute equaliser against Wolverhampton Wanderers. He struggled to get into the starting line-up as Conor Sammon and Jamie Ward were Clough's preferred attackers. Still, Robinson regained his place in the starting line-up after an injury to Ward, and Clough praised Robinson for his improved work ethic, saying, "... he's doing his job now... he now has seven goals for the season and he is liable to get goals." On 22 February 2013, after asking to leave on loan to get regular first-team football, Robinson rejoined his former club Huddersfield Town on an emergency loan to the end of the 2012–13 season. Upon his return to Pride Park in May, Robinson was made available for transfer with one year left on his contract.

=== Doncaster Rovers ===
In August 2013, Robinson signed with Doncaster Rovers on a two-year contract for an undisclosed fee. The fee was undisclosed but was reported to be in the region of £150,000. He scored his first goal for the club on his debut the following day, in a 2–0 win over Blackburn Rovers. He ended the 2013–14 campaign with five goals in 31 Championship games as "Donny" were relegated into League One.

On 26 March 2015, he joined divisional rivals Scunthorpe United on loan until the end of the 2014–15 season. The move to Glanford Park reunited him with his former Huddersfield manager Mark Robins. He was released by Rovers manager Paul Dickov in May 2015.

=== Motherwell ===
Robinson signed for Scottish Premiership side Motherwell in August 2015 on a contract running until the end of the 2015–16 season. He said that he was attracted to the club as he was already friends with teammates Lionel Ainsworth and Stephen Pearson. He was initially used as a substitute by manager Ian Baraclough. He fell out of the first-team picture under new manager Mark McGhee, who later said that "It's not quite worked out for Theo here at Fir Park, but that can happen, particularly if the manager who signs you leaves so soon after you arrive."

=== Port Vale ===
In January 2016, Robinson signed for League One side Port Vale on a contract running until the end of the 2015–16 season. He scored his first goal for the club on his eighth appearance, the opening goal of a 2–0 win over Colchester United at Vale Park on 5 March. He was released upon the expiry of his contract at the end of the season.

=== Lincoln City ===
Robinson signed a short-term contract with National League club Lincoln City in October 2016. On 7 January, he scored both of the "Imps" goals in a 2–2 draw with Championship side Ipswich Town in an FA Cup third round tie at Portman Road. He also scored against Brighton & Hove Albion in the following round, and left Lincoln with the club in the fifth round of the FA Cup and top of the National League.

=== Southend United ===
Robinson returned to EFL League One when he joined Southend United for an undisclosed fee on a two-and-a-half-year contract on 31 January 2017. Manager Phil Brown had rejected the chance to sign Robinson the previous summer after the player had a trial at the club, and admitted he had made a mistake in doing so. He made 18 appearances in the second half of the 2016–17 season and signed a one-year contract extension in August 2017. However, he made just two league starts in the first half of the 2017–18 season and rejected the chance to join Colchester United on loan in January after his preferred option of Lincoln City were rebuffed by chairman Ron Martin. He was instead restored to the first-team at Roots Hall by new manager Chris Powell, and scored a hat-trick in a 4–0 win over Milton Keynes Dons on 21 April to earn himself a place on the EFL team of the week. He was nominated for that month's PFA Fan's Player Of The Month award.

Robinson began the 2018–19 season on the bench, though did score three goals in his five starts by the start of October. He went on to make 13 league starts and 11 substitute appearances in the first half of the campaign, scoring four goals. On 31 January, he joined EFL League Two side Swindon Town on loan until the end of the 2018–19 season. He went on to score seven goals in 16 games for the "Robins", helping to relegate Notts County with a brace at the County Ground on the final day of the season. Swindon manager Richie Wellens was reportedly keen to sign him permanently once the loan spell came to an end.

On 29 August 2019, Robinson joined League Two side Colchester United on loan until January 2020. He scored his first goal for "U's" in their 3–2 EFL Trophy win against Gillingham on 3 September. After a relatively successful start to the campaign for Robinson, the loan deal was extended until the end of the 2019–20 season on 14 January. On 11 February, he scored his 100th Football League goal in a 3–2 defeat at Grimsby Town. He had scored 12 goals in 36 games by the time the 2019–20 season was ended early in March due to the COVID-19 pandemic in England; Southend would be relegated after the table was concluded on a points per game basis. He returned to Colchester to play in the play-off semi-finals, which ended in a 3–2 aggregate defeat to Exeter City. He scored at a rate of one every 157 minutes during his loan spell, a statistic bettered only by Eoin Doyle in League Two. He confirmed his departure from Southend in June 2020.

=== Return to Port Vale ===
On 24 August 2020, Robinson rejoined Port Vale on a two-year deal, where he faced competition from Tom Pope, Mark Cullen and Devante Rodney for a place in the starting eleven. He stated that "when I was here before it wasn't really a good time personally but now I am here to put things right". It was reported that Grimsby manager Ian Holloway had tried to sign him but lost out due to his club insisting on a clause to reduce pay if the league was postponed or cancelled again due to a second wave of Coronavirus disease 2019 cases; Vale reportedly had no such clause in their contract offer. On 5 September, he scored on his second debut for the Vale, coming on as a substitute to score a late winner in a 2–1 victory over Scunthorpe United in the first round of the EFL Cup, manager John Askey said that "It's nice when you have someone like Theo who can come on and has goals in him". Robinson set a personal target of 10 goals for the campaign but said the main aim was promotion. Having started the 2020–21 season on the bench, he claimed a place in the starting eleven by mid-October after becoming the club's leading scorer. He soon dropped out of the starting eleven however, and was transfer-listed in December. Caretaker manager Danny Pugh deregistered Robinson from the club's 22-man squad the following month in order to make room for new signing Kurtis Guthrie. He was re-registered at the end of the January transfer window and went on to earn praise for his work rate from new manager Darrell Clarke but was still transfer-listed in May 2021. He left the club by mutual consent on 31 August 2021.

=== Bradford City ===
Having secured his release from Port Vale, Robinson signed a one-year contract with League Two club Bradford City after manager Derek Adams needed cover for the injured Lee Angol. He was dropped by new manager Mark Hughes in early March. He did not feature again at Valley Parade, leaving his final tally at four goals in 26 appearances, of which only five appearances were league starts. Robinson was released at the end of his one-year deal. Robinson was a trialist for Mansfield Town in August 2022 but was not offered a contract.

=== Hartlepool United ===
On 13 October 2022, Robinson had signed for League Two side Hartlepool United. Interim manager Keith Curle said that "Theo is a player we've tried signing before and he's turned down other offers to join". Robinson left the club on 26 November 2022, with Curle stating that: "Theo is no longer with us. It was my choice."

=== Later career ===
In March 2023, Robinson signed for National League North club Brackley Town. He started eight games and made six substitute appearances in the remainder of the 2022–23 season as Brackley reached the final of the play-offs, where they were beaten 2–0 by Kidderminster Harriers. In January 2024, Robinson signed for Gloucester City in the National League North on a contract until the end of the 2023–24 season. Despite scoring seven goals in 17 games, Gloucester were relegated in 23rd place.

In August 2024, Robinson joined Southern Premier Division Central club Bromsgrove Sporting. He scored 13 goals in 44 appearances across the 2024–25 campaign and three goals from 17 games in the 2025–26 season.

== International career ==
In November 2012, the Jamaica Football Federation reported that Robinson had shown interest in playing for the Reggae Boyz and that he was in the pool of players eligible to be called up for the 2014 FIFA World Cup qualifiers. He won his first cap in a 0–0 draw with Mexico on 6 February 2013.

== Style of play ==
Robinson is a pacey striker.

== Personal life ==
In April 2020, Robinson launched a YouTube channel called The Ball Don't Lie, along with Colchester teammate Frank Nouble.

== Career statistics ==
As of match played 26 April 2026

Appearances and goals by club, season and competition
Club	Season	League			National cup (Note: Includes FA Cup, Scottish Cup)		League cup (Note: Includes Football League Cup, Scottish League Cup)		Other		Total	
Club	Season	Division	Apps	Goals	Apps	Goals	Apps	Goals	Apps	Goals	Apps	Goals
Watford	2005–06	Championship	1	0	0	0	0	0	0	0	1	0
Watford	2006–07	Premier League	1	0	0	0	0	0	—		1	0
Watford	2007–08	Championship	0	0	0	0	0	0	0	0	0	0
Watford	2008–09	Championship	3	0	0	0	1	0	—		4	0
Watford	Total		5	0	0	0	1	0	0	0	6	0
Hereford United (loan)	2007–08	League Two	43	13	6	2	2	1	1 (Note: Appearances in the Football League Trophy)	0	52	16
Southend United (loan)	2008–09	League One	21	7	—		—		—		21	7
Huddersfield Town	2009–10	League One	37	13	3	0	2	3	1 (Note: Appearance in the League One play-offs)	0	43	16
Huddersfield Town	2010–11	League One	1	0	0	0	1	0	0	0	2	0
Millwall	2010–11	Championship	11	3	0	0	0	0	—		11	3
Derby County	2010–11	Championship	13	2	—		—		—		13	2
Derby County	2011–12	Championship	39	10	1	1	1	1	0	0	41	12
Derby County	2012–13	Championship	28	8	0	0	1	1	0	0	29	9
Derby County	Total		80	20	1	1	2	2	0	0	83	23
Huddersfield Town (loan)	2012–13	Championship	6	0	—		—		—		6	0
Doncaster Rovers	2013–14	Championship	31	5	0	0	1	0	—		32	5
Doncaster Rovers	2014–15	League One	32	7	4	0	2	0	2	0	40	7
Doncaster Rovers	Total		63	12	4	0	3	0	2	0	72	12
Scunthorpe United (loan)	2014–15	League One	8	3	—		—		—		8	3
Motherwell	2015–16	Scottish Premiership	10	0	0	0	1	0	—		11	0
Port Vale	2015–16	League One	14	2	—		—		—		14	2
Lincoln City	2016–17	National League	14	1	7	7	—		1 (Note: Appearance in the FA Trophy)	0	22	8
Southend United	2016–17	League One	18	2	—		—		—		18	2
Southend United	2017–18	League One	25	5	0	0	1	0	4 (Note: Appearance in the EFL Trophy)	2	30	7
Southend United	2018–19	League One	24	4	3	0	1	0	3	0	31	4
Southend United	2019–20	League One	3	0	0	0	1	0	0	0	4	0
Southend United	Total		70	11	3	0	3	0	7	2	83	13
Swindon Town (loan)	2018–19	League Two	16	7	—		—		—		16	7
Colchester United (loan)	2019–20	League Two	28	11	0	0	0	0	6 (Note: Four appearances and one goal in EFL Trophy, two appearances in EFL League Two play-offs)	1	34	12
Port Vale	2020–21	League Two	29	3	1	0	2	1	5	2	37	6
Port Vale	2021–22	League Two	0	0	0	0	0	0	0	0	0	0
Port Vale	Total		29	3	1	0	2	1	5	2	37	6
Bradford City	2021–22	League Two	23	2	2	1	—		1	1	26	4
Hartlepool United	2022–23	League Two	6	0	2	0	—		1	0	9	0
Brackley Town	2022–23	National League North	11	1	0	0	—		3 (Note: Appearances in the National League North play-offs)	1	14	2
Gloucester City	2023–24	National League North	17	7	0	0	—		0	0	17	7
Bromsgrove Sporting	2024–25	Southern Premier; Division Central	37	10	4	2	—		3 (Note: 2 appearances and 1 goal in the Worcestershire Senior Cup and 1 appearance in the FA Trophy)	1	44	13
Bromsgrove Sporting	2025–26	Southern Premier; Division Central	17	3	0	0	—		0	0	17	3
Bromsgrove Sporting	2026–27	Southern Premier; Division Central	0	0	0	0	—		0	0	0	0
Bromsgrove Sporting	Total		54	13	4	2	0	0	3	1	61	16
Career total (Note: Statistics for Wealdstone unavailable.)			567	129	33	13	17	7	31	8	648	157

== Honours ==
Hereford United

- Football League Two third-place promotion: 2007–08
