= Kris Taylor =

English footballer and manager

Personal information
- Full name: Kris Taylor
- Date of birth: 12 January 1984 (age 42)
- Place of birth: Cannock, England
- Height: 1.75 m (5 ft 9 in)
- Positions: Left-back; left winger

Team information
- Current team: Stafford Town

Youth career
- 1998: Wolverhampton Wanderers
- 1998–2001: Manchester United

Senior career*
Years	Team	Apps	(Gls)
2001–2003	Manchester United	0	(0)
2003–2007	Walsall	82	(6)
2004–2005	→ Burton Albion (loan)	5	(3)
2006	→ Burton Albion (loan)	15	(4)
2007–2009	Hereford United	70	(2)
2009–2011	Port Vale	61	(3)
2011–2012	Darlington	20	(0)
2012	Darlington	16	(0)
2012–2013	AFC Telford United	23	(0)
2013	→ Hednesford Town (loan)	10	(4)
2013–2014	Hednesford Town	42	(2)
2014–2016	Rushall Olympic		
2016–2017	Stafford Rangers		
2017	Hednesford Town	7	(0)
2017	Sutton Coldfield Town		
2017–2019	Romulus		
2020–2025	Chasetown	114	(3)
2025	Dudley Town	10	(0)
2025	Chasetown	0	(0)
2025–	Stafford Town	16	(0)

Managerial career
- 2019–2020: Walsall Wood
- * Club domestic league appearances and goals as of 19:00, 1 May 2026 (UTC)

Kris Taylor (born 12 January 1984) is an English football manager and former professional player who plays for North West Counties League Division One South club Stafford Town.

Primarily as a left-sided midfielder, he never made the first team at Manchester United. Instead, he spent over three seasons at Walsall after signing in February 2003. He spent two seasons at Hereford United from 2007 to 2009 before moving on to Port Vale for another two-season spell. Following this, he signed with non-League Darlington in June 2011, before his contract was terminated in January 2012. He signed with AFC Telford United in August 2012 and was loaned out to Hednesford Town in March 2013. His move to Hednesford was permanent three months later, after he helped the club to win the Birmingham Senior Cup and the Northern Premier League play-off final. He continued playing for the club after beating testicular cancer in 2014, representing Hednesford Town, Rushall Olympic, Stafford Rangers, Sutton Coldfield Town, and Romulus.

He served Walsall Wood as manager from November 2019 to January 2020. He then returned to playing with Chasetown and played in the finals of both the Walsall Senior Cup and Staffordshire Senior Cup. He joined Dudley Town in September 2025 and moved on to Stafford Town via Chasetown by the end of the year.

== Playing career ==
=== Walsall ===
Taylor was born in Cannock and was originally on the books of Wolves; he was signed by Manchester United at the age of 14 for a fee of £200,000. He signed his first professional contract on 26 January 2001, but never played for the first team. He left Old Trafford in February 2003, having featured three times for the reserves, and joined Walsall.

Initially playing for the reserves at Walsall, he went on to score on his first-team debut on 31 January 2004 in a 3–2 defeat away at Stoke City. He went on to make a further ten first-team appearances for the club that season. He was retained upon the season's conclusion, signing a one-year deal. Walsall having been relegated in 2003–04, Taylor could still not break into the team in League One. After three cup and three league appearances early in 2004–05 he was put on the transfer list by Paul Merson. Taylor went out on loan to Burton Albion in December, after he caught the eye of Nigel Clough during a Birmingham Senior Cup match with Burton. He impressed at Eton Park, making a total of six appearances and scoring four goals. He scored a memorable goal from 35 yards (32 m) against Tamworth, and also scored against his future club Hereford in a 3–0 win. He scored four goals in six games for the Conference club, making a massive impact in his five weeks in Burton. On his return to the Bescot Stadium an offer from Carlisle United was rejected. He signed a new two-year contract at the end of the season.

He was a regular in the first team in the first half of the 2005–06 season before returning to Burton Albion in early January. This time, the loan lasted until the end of the season, though Taylor didn't manage to find the form he had reached in his previous loan spell. He scored four goals in 15 games before returning to Walsall in time for the last game of the season. Walsall were relegated once again in 2005–06, leaving them in League Two for 2006–07 season. He hit forty games for the "Swifts", helping the club achieve promotion as champions. Taylor was not rewarded for his efforts and was instead told to look for a new club by "Saddlers" boss Richard Money.

=== Hereford United ===
In July 2007, he signed for Hereford United. In his first season with the club he was noted for his versatility, playing at left-back, left midfield and central midfield. In similar form to the previous season, Taylor put in a forty-game season to help his club win promotion to League One, this time with a third-place finish. In contrast to his experience with Walsall, Taylor stayed with the "Bulls" for the 2008–09 campaign. He played 43 games, though could do little to prevent the "Whites" suffering relegation with a last-place finish, 14 points off safety. Holding out on the club's offer of a new contract, he left the club in the summer of 2009 in search of pastures new.

=== Port Vale ===
In July 2009 he went out on trial at League Two side Port Vale, and scored from around 20 yards in a 7–0 win over Rocester in a pre-season friendly. He impressed manager Micky Adams on his trial and would have been signed to a contract if the cash-strapped club could find the finance; instead Adams offered Taylor non-contract terms, he signed a short-term deal in early August. This was not enough for Taylor, who resolved to win a long-term contract with the club. His man of the match performances also persuaded Adams to try to hold on to him. On 25 August he went a long way towards achieving this goal, scoring a wonder goal in a 2–0 win over Sheffield Wednesday in the League Cup Second Round.

"I was happy to see Vale get the win, and the first goal from Kris Taylor was probably the goal of the competition so far."

— Pundit and former Vale star Mark Bright.

Unable to find the cash to fund Taylor's wages, the club were aided by a £5,000 donation from 'Vale Volunteers', raised specifically by fans to keep Taylor at the club. He was transfer listed in late September, along with the entire Port Vale squad, after manager Micky Adams saw his team slip to a third consecutive defeat. His second goal of the season came in the local derby at Crewe Alexandra, Taylor scoring the winner in a 2–1 victory. In October 2009 he signed a new deal that would keep him at the club until the end of the season. He made 49 appearances throughout the season, as his club finished just outside the play-offs. He was offered a new one-year contract by the club at the end of the season, which he quickly signed. His manager explained that Taylor's inconsistency prevented a longer contract offer, and Taylor accepted the explanation.

He made a slow start to the 2010–11 campaign. In November, he declared that he aimed to re-establish himself into the first team. He got his opportunity to shine when left-back Lee Collins was out of action for a month with split shins. Ending the season with just twenty league appearances throughout the season, he was released from the club in May 2011. Adams said that he had faith in Taylor's ability, but that he hadn't played enough games in 2010–11 to justify a new contract.

=== Non-League ===
In June 2011, he signed a one-year contract with Darlington of the Conference National. Manager Mark Cooper stated that "It's a big signing for us, Kris has a great range of passing and is a set piece specialist, he's certainly a player who will excite." Darlington suffered financial difficulties during Taylor's time at the club and his contract was terminated on 16 January 2012, along with the rest of the playing squad and caretaker manager Craig Liddle. However, a surprise decision meant that the club would continue to complete their remaining fixtures, and Taylor returned to Darlington on a non-contract basis. In August 2012, he returned to Port Vale to train and maintain his match fitness. On 9 August, he signed a one-year deal with Conference club AFC Telford United. Manager Andy Sinton said that "We're very fortunate to get somebody of his calibre".

Taylor joined Northern Premier League side Hednesford Town on loan in March 2013. He was recalled to the Telford squad for the last two games of the season after Ryan Valentine and Dan Preston both picked up injuries. Telford ended the season in last place and were relegated. Taylor returned to Keys Park to help the "Pitmen" win the Birmingham Senior Cup final against Sutton Coldfield Town and the play-off final against F.C. United of Manchester. The move had been made permanent in June when Taylor signed a one-year contract with Hednesford. He made 36 appearances in the 2013–14 season, as the club reached the play-off semi-finals, where they were beaten by Altrincham. He was named Conference North Player of the Month for February 2024 despite only playing one game, as sponsors Skrill wanted to support his battle against cancer. He was released in October 2014. He later played for Rushall Olympic. He joined Stafford Rangers in June 2016. Rangers finished 13th in the Northern Premier League Premier Division at the end of 2016–17 season. He rejoined Hednesford Town – local rivals to Stafford Rangers – as a player-coach under manager Neil Tooth in May 2017. In May 2017 he was signed by new Sutton Coldfield Town manager Neil Tooth as a player-coach. Four months later he followed Tooth to Romulus. The "Roms" were relegated at the end of the 2017–18 season after finishing bottom of the Northern Premier League Division One South.

After his management spell at Walsall Wood ended, he returned to playing with Chasetown of the Northern Premier League Division One South East, making six appearances in the 2020–21 season. He also worked as a coach at the club. He made 31 appearances in the 2021–22 season, scoring one goal, as he helped the "Scholars" to reach the play-offs. He did not feature in the play-off final defeat to Belper Town. He made 37 appearances in the 2022–23 campaign, scoring one goal and making five assists. He continued playing for the club at the age of 40, featuring 32 times in the 2023–24 campaign, including in the Walsall Senior Cup final defeat to Rushall Olympic. He played 37 games in the 2024–25 campaign, including in the Staffordshire Senior Cup final win over Rushall Olympic.

In September 2025, Taylor joined Midland League Premier Division club Dudley Town. He returned to Chasetown and then signed with Stafford Town on Boxing Day. He played 17 games for Stafford in the second half of the 2025–26 campaign, including the play-off semi-final defeat to Eccleshall.

== Management career ==
Taylor was appointed joint-manager of Midland League Premier Division side Walsall Wood, along with Peter Till, in November 2019. The pair were demoted to assistant managers following the re-appointment of former manager Darren Byfield in January 2020. The 2019–20 season was formally abandoned due to the coronavirus pandemic in England on 26 March 2020, with all results from the season being expunged, and no promotion or relegation taking place to, from, or within the competition.

== Style of play ==
Former Port Vale and Hereford teammate Lee Collins described Taylor as: "really good on the ball and is also good to have around. He filled in at left-back at Hereford but is also talented in central midfield. He has two good feet but is particularly strong on his left foot. He's got a good touch and a good passing range."

Early in his career, he was a goalscoring midfielder, and in January 2005 said that the left-back spot "isn't really me". In addition to his ability to play down the wings, he can also play as a centre-back if the situation dictates.

"The best [full-back] I have come up against this season would be Port Vale's Kris Taylor. His positioning as a full back is very good and he has got a great left foot. He also contributes with a goal now and then as well and is comfortable with the ball at his feet which is something you can't say about every defender in this division."

— Notts County midfielder Ben Davies speaking in March 2010.

== Personal life ==
Taylor is a Manchester United supporter. In January 2011, his fiancée Jenny gave birth to the couple's first child, Lydia.

In January 2014, Taylor was informed he had been diagnosed with testicular cancer. His tumour was removed and after one dose of chemotherapy he returned to playing football within weeks.

He graduated from Manchester Metropolitan University in July 2016 with a bachelor's degree in Sports Science.

== Career statistics ==
As of match played 25 April 2026

Appearances and goals by club, season and competition
Club	Season	League			FA Cup		League Cup		Other		Total	
Club	Season	Division	Apps	Goals	Apps	Goals	Apps	Goals	Apps	Goals	Apps	Goals
Walsall	2003–04	First Division	11	1	0	0	0	0	—		11	1
Walsall	2004–05	League One	12	2	0	0	1	0	2 (Note: Appearance(s) in the Football League Trophy / EFL Trophy.)	0	15	2
Walsall	2005–06	League One	24	2	2	0	0	0	1	0	27	2
Walsall	2006–07	League Two	35	1	2	0	2	0	1	0	40	1
Walsall	Total		82	6	4	0	3	0	4	0	93	6
Burton Albion (loan)	2004–05	Conference National	5	3	0	0	—		1 (Note: Appearance(s) in the FA Trophy.)	1	6	4
Burton Albion (loan)	2005–06	Conference National	15	4	0	0	—		0	0	15	4
Burton Albion (loan)	Total		20	7	0	0	0	0	1	1	21	8
Hereford United	2007–08	League Two	31	1	6	0	2	0	1	0	40	1
Hereford United	2008–09	League One	39	1	2	1	1	0	1	0	43	2
Hereford United	Total		70	2	8	1	3	0	2	0	83	3
Port Vale	2009–10	League Two	41	3	3	0	3	1	2	0	49	4
Port Vale	2010–11	League Two	20	0	3	0	1	0	2	0	26	0
Port Vale	Total		61	3	6	0	4	1	4	0	75	4
Darlington	2011–12	Conference National	36	0	1	0	—		1	0	38	0
AFC Telford United	2012–13	Conference National	23	0	3	1	—		1	1	27	2
Hednesford Town	2012–13	Northern Premier League; Premier Division	10	4	0	0	—		1	0	11	4
Hednesford Town	2013–14	Conference North	33	2	2	0	—		1	0	36	2
Hednesford Town	2014–15	Conference North	9	0	0	0	—		0	0	9	0
Hednesford Town	2017–18	Northern Premier League; Premier Division	7	0	0	0	—		0	0	7	0
Hednesford Town	Total		59	6	2	0	0	0	2	0	63	6
Chasetown	2020–21	Northern Premier League; Division One South East	4	1	2	0	—		0	0	6	1
Chasetown	2021–22	Northern Premier League; Division One Midlands	27	1	0	0	—		4 (Note: 3 appearances in the FA Trophy and 1 appearance in the Walsall Senior Cup.)	0	31	1
Chasetown	2022–23	Northern Premier League; Division One Midlands	27	1	4	0	—		6 (Note: 4 appearances in the FA Trophy, 1 appearance in the Staffordshire Senior Cup and 1 appearance in the Walsall Senior Cup.)	0	37	1
Chasetown	2023–24	Northern Premier League; Division One West	28	0	0	0	—		4 (Note: 3 appearances and 1 goal in the Walsall Senior Cup and 1 appearance in the Staffordshire Senior Cup)	2	32	2
Chasetown	2024–25	Northern Premier League; Division One West	28	0	0	0	—		9 (Note: 3 appearances in the FA Trophy, 1 appearance in the Walsall Senior Cup, 4 appearances in the Staffordshire Senior Cup and 1 appearance in the play-offs)	0	37	0
Chasetown	2025–26	Northern Premier League; Division One West	0	0	1	0	—		0	0	1	0
Chasetown	Total		114	3	7	0	0	0	23	2	144	5
Dudley Town	2025–26	Midland League; Premier Division	10	0	0	0	—		3 (Note: Competition not specified)	0	13	0
Stafford Town	2025–26	North West Counties League; Division One South	16	0	0	0	—		1 (Note: Appearance(s) in the play-offs.)	0	17	0
Stafford Town	2026–27	North West Counties League; Division One South	0	0	0	0	—		0	0	0	0
Stafford Town	Total		16	0	0	0	0	0	1	0	17	0
Career total (Note: Complete statistics after 2014–15 season not available.)			491	27	31	2	10	1	42	4	574	34

== Honours ==
Walsall

- Football League Two: 2006–07

Hereford United

- Football League Two third-place promotion: 2007–08

Hednesford Town

- Birmingham Senior Cup: 2013
- Northern Premier League play-offs: 2013

Chasetown

- Walsall Senior Cup runner-up: 2024
- Staffordshire Senior Cup: 2025
