= Karl Broadhurst =

English footballer (born 1980)

Personal information
- Full name: Karl Matthew Broadhurst
- Date of birth: 18 March 1980 (age 46)
- Place of birth: Portsmouth, England
- Height: 6 ft 1 in (1.85 m)
- Position: Centre back

Youth career
- 1992–1998: AFC Bournemouth

Senior career*
Years	Team	Apps	(Gls)
1998–2007	AFC Bournemouth	191	(3)
2007–2009	Hereford United	48	(1)
2009–2010	Crawley Town	33	(0)
2010	AFC Telford United	0	(0)
2011–2012	Solihull Moors	28	(0)

Managerial career
- 2013–2014: Solihull Moors (assistant)
- 2026–: Wolverhampton Wanderers U18
- * Club domestic league appearances and goals

Karl Matthew Broadhurst (born 18 March 1980) is an English former footballer who played as a central defender. He played in the Football League with AFC Bournemouth and Hereford United, and in non-League with Crawley Town, AFC Telford United and Solihull Moors.

== Biography ==
Broadhurst was born in Portsmouth and joined AFC Bournemouth at the age of 12. He progressed through the youth system and made his first team debut in the League Cup against Charlton Athletic in the 1999-00 season where he won man of the match. His league debut came four days later, and he quickly established himself in the first team squad. Despite being hampered by a persistent ankle injury which kept him out until October 2000, he made 32 appearances during the 2000-01 season. He was an ever-present the following season until February 2002 when he lost his place in the team, thanks to a broken nose sustained in training and the fine form of Shaun Maher. He regained his place in the team for the first half of 2002–03, and scored his first goal for the club in November 2002. However, he then suffered first a broken ankle, and then a dislocated shoulder, which ended his season.

The 2003–04 season saw Broadhurst make 44 appearances as captain of the first team, and the first half of the following season was also trouble-free. In February 2005 he was sidelined with a recurring back problem which meant he missed an entire year of first team football, not playing for the first team again until February 2006. After making 30 appearances during the 2006–07 season, his contract was not renewed and he left Bournemouth on 8 May 2007, after a fourteen-year association with the club.

On 4 July 2007, he signed for Hereford United. He was also made captain for the 2007–08 season.

After a good start to the 2007–08 season at the heart of the Hereford defence, Broadhurst suffered an ankle injury in the FA Cup against Leeds United. He returned for the run-in as Hereford gained promotion to Football League One. Despite missing the opening matches of the following season with a dislocated shoulder, he re-established himself as first choice centre back. At the end of the season he was released by Hereford after two seasons at the club.

After a trial at his former club Bournemouth, he joined Crawley Town at the start of the 2009–10 season. He was released by Crawley at the end of the season as his contract was not renewed.

In the 2010 close season, Karl signed for Conference North side AFC Telford United but left without making any senior appearances in August due to work commitments.

In July 2011, Broadhurst signed for Solihull Moors. In July 2013, he retired from playing but continued in his role as assistant manager. He left Solihull by mutual consent at the end of the 2013–14 season.

== Career statistics ==
Appearances and goals by club, season and competition
Club	Season	League			FA Cup		League Cup		Other		Total	
Club	Season	Division	Apps	Goals	Apps	Goals	Apps	Goals	Apps	Goals	Apps	Goals
AFC Bournemouth	1999–00	Second Division	16	0	1	0	3	0	1 (Note: Appearance(s) in Football League Trophy.)	0	21	0
AFC Bournemouth	2000–01	Second Division	30	0	2	0	0	0	1	0	33	0
AFC Bournemouth	2001–02	Second Division	23	0	2	0	1	0	1	0	27	0
AFC Bournemouth	2002–03	Third Division	21	1	3	1	1	0	3	0	28	2
AFC Bournemouth	2003–04	Second Division	39	1	3	0	1	0	1	0	44	1
AFC Bournemouth	2004–05	League One	29	1	5	0	3	1	1	0	38	2
AFC Bournemouth	2005–06	League One	6	0	0	0	0	0	0	0	6	0
AFC Bournemouth	2006–07	League One	27	0	2	0	1	0	0	0	30	0
AFC Bournemouth	Total		191	3	18	1	10	1	8	0	227	5
Hereford United	2007–08	League Two	23	0	1	0	2	0	0	0	26	0
Hereford United	2008–09	League One	25	1	2	0	0	0	1	0	28	1
Hereford United	Total		48	1	3	0	2	0	1	0	54	1
Crawley Town	2009–10	Conference National	33	0	0	0	—		0	0	33	0
Solihull Moors	2011–12	Conference North	16	0	0	0	—		1 (Note: Appearance in FA Trophy.)	0	17	0
Solihull Moors	2012–13	Conference North	12	0	0	0	—		0	0	12	0
Solihull Moors	Total		28	0	0	0	0	0	1	0	29	0
Career total			300	4	21	1	12	1	10	0	343	6
