= Wayne Brown (footballer, born January 1977) =

English footballer and coach

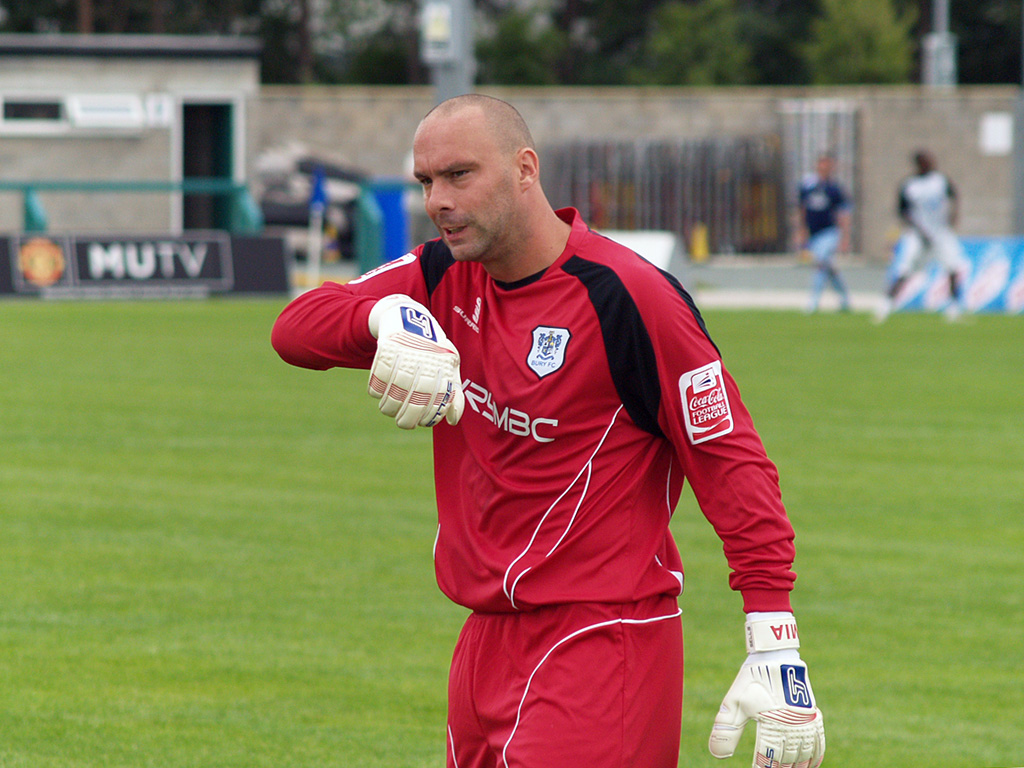
- Brown playing for Bury in 2008

Personal information
- Full name: Wayne Larry Brown
- Date of birth: 14 January 1977 (age 49)
- Place of birth: Southampton, England
- Height: 1.85 m (6 ft 1 in)
- Position: Goalkeeper

Team information
- Current team: Forest Green Rovers (goalkeeping coach)

Youth career
- 1992: Bashley
- 1993–1995: Bristol City

Senior career*
Years	Team	Apps	(Gls)
1995–1996	Bristol City	1	(0)
1996	Weston-super-Mare	?	(?)
1996–2006	Chester City	289	(0)
2005–2006	→ Hereford United (loan)	33	(0)
2006–2008	Hereford United	83	(0)
2008–2010	Bury	76	(0)
2010–2011	Supersport United	13	(0)
2011–2017	Oxford United	6	(0)
Total		510	(0)

International career
2001–2003	England C	7	(0)
- * Club domestic league appearances and goals

Wayne Larry Brown (born 14 January 1977) is an English former professional footballer who played as a goalkeeper. He is the current goalkeeping coach at Aston Villa Women’s and England women's U23.

== Career ==
Born in Southampton, former bricklayer Brown made a switch from Bashley to Bristol City for £40,000 in December 1992. Between 1993 and 1996 he made only 24 appearances for the Robins due to a number of injuries. Although only one of these was for the first team, a 4–1 win over Peterborough on 8 May 1994, he was awarded Man of the Match. After a brief spell with Weston-super-Mare he joined Chester City in September 1996, initially as cover for Ronnie Sinclair (who had an elbow injury and needed surgery) and then in direct competition with Neil Cutler. In a ten-season stint with the club he made 289 appearances, becoming first-choice keeper in the 1999–2000 season, the first of two seasons in which he did not miss a league match.

While at Chester he made seven appearances for the England National Game XI semi-professional side. He suffered an injury in training in December 2003 that sidelined him for the remainder of the 2003–04 season, as Chester ended the season as Football Conference champions. He enjoyed a testimonial match against former players in May 2004 and returned to the side at the start of the next season, but was deemed surplus to requirements in May 2005 and dropped back into the Conference for a season-long loan with Hereford United.

Brown was the first-choice keeper for Hereford in Conference matches (but was not allowed by Chester to play in cup games) and was an integral part of the best defence in the Conference that season, conceding just 30 goals. He became a fans' favourite, earning the nickname 'Superman'. In the 2006 Conference play-off final with just a few minutes to go in extra time, Brown sustained a head injury in a collision. With all three substitutions made it looked for a moment as if he would be unable to continue, but after several minutes he recovered and even made a good save in the dying minutes to keep Hereford 3–2 up. Hereford went on to win the match and promotion to the Football League, and Brown signed for Hereford permanently soon afterwards.

Brown was first-choice keeper at Edgar Street in Hereford's first two seasons back in the Football League, missing just 9 league matches out of a possible 92. The 2007–08 season saw him keep 17 clean sheets and concede 41 goals in the league, as Hereford gained promotion to League One. He kept a further four clean sheets in the FA Cup, most notably in the victory over Leeds United at Elland Road. This match was also his 100th competitive appearance for the club.

Brown's highlight of the season, as recognised by Graham Turner, came in the 1–0 win at Mansfield Town. In the last minute of normal time he saved Michael Boulding's penalty in front of the travelling support who celebrated as if Hereford had scored a goal, and in the last seconds of the match he made a further save to deny Jefferson Louis, rescuing Hereford again.

Despite being named Player of the Year, Brown rejected a new contract and League One football at Edgar Street and instead signed for Bury on a two-year contract. On 15 August 2009 he saved a late Dean Windass penalty to help his side secure a 1–0 win over Darlington.

In July 2010 he signed with Supersport United. On 28 July 2011 Brown returned to England, signing a one-year deal with Oxford United following a successful trial. He signed a further two-year contract with Oxford as player/goalkeeping coach in May 2012.

== Coaching career ==
In July 2023, Brown ended his twelve-year association with Oxford United having left his role of goalkeeping coach.

In June 2024, he joined National League side Forest Green Rovers as goalkeeping coach, having supported the club at the end of the previous season. He would also continue in his role of goalkeeping coach with the England women's U23 team.

== Personal life ==
Since his retirement, Brown has run goalkeeping academies in Reading, Southampton and Oxfordshire.
