= Toumani Diagouraga =

French footballer (born 1987)

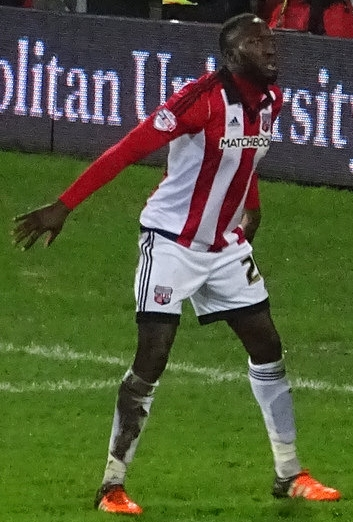
- Diagouraga playing for Brentford in 2015

Personal information
- Full name: Toumani Diagouraga
- Date of birth: 10 June 1987 (age 39)
- Place of birth: Paris, France
- Height: 6 ft 2 in (1.88 m)
- Position: Defensive midfielder

Team information
- Current team: Middlesbrough (academy coach)

Youth career
- 2003–2004: Watford

Senior career*
Years	Team	Apps	(Gls)
2004–2008	Watford	1	(0)
2006	→ Swindon Town (loan)	8	(0)
2007	→ Rotherham United (loan)	7	(0)
2007–2008	→ Hereford United (loan)	41	(2)
2008–2009	Hereford United	45	(2)
2009–2010	Peterborough United	19	(0)
2010–2016	Brentford	210	(6)
2014	→ Portsmouth (loan)	8	(0)
2016–2017	Leeds United	18	(2)
2017	→ Ipswich Town (loan)	12	(0)
2017–2018	Plymouth Argyle	15	(3)
2018	Fleetwood Town	17	(1)
2018–2020	Swindon Town	12	(0)
2020–2022	Morecambe	88	(6)
2022–2023	Rochdale	31	(0)
Total		529	(22)
- * Club domestic league appearances and goals

Toumani Diagouraga (born 10 June 1987) is a French football coach and former professional player who played as a defensive midfielder. He is currently an academy coach for EFL Championship club Middlesbrough. He played his entire career in the English Football League and made 529 League appearances between 2005 and 2023.

Diagouraga began his career at Watford and played for Hereford United and Peterborough United, before rising to prominence with Brentford, for whom he made 246 appearances in all competitions. Nicknamed "Toums", he was described as a midfielder who "can keep the shape and pick up the second ball".

== Playing career ==
=== Watford ===
==== 2004–2006 ====
Diagouraga was born in Paris to Malian parents and began his career in youth football in the city. He subsequently suffered a broken shoulder in a traffic accident, but returned to football and was spotted in a trial match versus an academy team from English club Watford. After a number of further trial matches, he joined the Hornets' academy in December 2003. He signed a professional contract in November 2004 at age 17 and starred in the youth team's run to the quarter-finals of the 2004–05 FA Youth Cup. His performances during the run attracted transfer interest from Premier League club Chelsea.

Diagouraga received his maiden call-up to the first team for the first game of the 2005–06 season, when he was an unused substitute during a 2–1 Championship defeat at home to Preston North End. Diagouraga made his first team debut with a start in Watford's 2–1 League Cup second round victory over Wolverhampton Wanderers on 20 September 2005 and he was substituted after 75 minutes by Junior Osborne. Diagouraga made three further appearances before joining League One club Swindon Town on loan on 23 March 2006. He made eight appearances and returned to Watford at the end of the season.

==== 2006–2008 ====
Following Watford's promotion to the Premier League, Diagouraga failed to be called into a league squad during the 2006–07 season and instead featured in two cup ties. He joined League One club Rotherham United on loan until the end of the season on 12 January 2007. The terms of the deal saw him arrive at Millmoor as a makeweight in a £1,000,000 deal that took Millers players Will Hoskins and Lee Williamson to Watford. Diagouraga made only seven appearances for the Millers.

Diagouraga spent the entire 2007–08 season away on loan and was released in June 2008, after his contract expired. He made only six appearances during his four years with the club as a professional.

=== Hereford United ===
Diagouraga joined League Two club Hereford United on 10 August 2007, on a loan that was later extended until the end of the 2007–08 season. He scored the first senior goal of his career in a 4–2 win over Bradford City on 22 September. He made 50 appearances during the 2007–08 season, scored two goals and celebrated promotion to League One at the end of the campaign, after the Bulls secured a third-place finish in League Two.

On 7 July 2008, Diagouraga transferred to Hereford United permanently and signed a three-year contract. He was a regular starter and scored his first goal of the 2008–09 season in a 2–2 draw at home to Tranmere Rovers on 26 December 2008. He was again a virtual ever-present, making 48 appearances and scoring two goals as the Bulls were relegated straight back to League Two after a bottom-place finish. He departed Edgar Street in June 2009. Across his two spells at the club, Diagouraga made 98 appearances and scored four goals.

=== Peterborough United ===
Diagouraga signed for Championship club Peterborough United on a four-year contract for an undisclosed fee (believed to be in the region of £200,000) on 17 June 2009. He was an ever-present through the first half of the 2009–10 season and featured in Posh's run to the League Cup fourth round, where they were knocked out by Premier League club Blackburn Rovers. Diagouraga made what would be his last Peterborough appearance in a 0–0 draw with Ipswich Town on 8 December. Following that appearance, he fell behind new loan signings Jake Livermore and Josh Simpson in the pecking order and found himself relegated to the bench, which led to his departure on loan for the rest of the season in January 2010. He departed the club on 17 July 2010, having made 23 appearances.

=== Brentford ===
==== 2010–2012 ====
Diagouraga joined League One club Brentford on a one-month loan on 21 January 2010 and the deal was later extended to the end of the season. He went straight into the starting lineup for Brentford's league match at Norwich City two days later and was substituted for Carl Cort after 59 minutes of the 1–0 defeat. Diagouraga quickly established himself as a regular starter and laid on goals for Charlie MacDonald and Myles Weston in a 4–0 drubbing of Gillingham on 6 February. He made 20 appearances during the second half of the 2009–10 season as Brentford consolidated their position in League One.

Diagouraga signed for Brentford on a three-year contract in July 2010. He began the 2010–11 season as a starting central midfielder alongside Marcus Bean and featured in Brentford's run to the fourth round of the League Cup, in which he started in victories over Championship club Hull City and Premier League Everton in the second and third rounds respectively. Diagouraga scored his first Brentford goal in a 2–1 home win over Charlton Athletic on 2 October. Two games later, he found himself dropped to the bench and did not return to a regular starting role until teammate Nicky Forster replaced Andy Scott as manager in February 2011. With the Bees, Diagouraga reached the first cup final of his career, but ended up on the losing club and was sent off for two bookable offences in a 1–0 defeat to Carlisle United in the 2011 Football League Trophy Final at Wembley Stadium. He made 43 appearances during the 2010–11 season and scored one goal.

Diagouraga suffered a knee injury in a 2011–12 pre-season friendly versus Hampton & Richmond Borough in July 2011, which ruled him out for two months. He returned to the team with a fifteen-minute cameo at the end of a 2–0 away victory over Oldham Athletic on 24 September. He made his first start of the season in a Football League Trophy second round tie away to Charlton Athletic on 5 October and scored his first goal of the season in the 3–0 victory. He twice assisted four-goal hero Mike Grella in a 6–0 win over AFC Bournemouth in the following round. Diagouraga enjoyed a successful 2011–12 season, making 40 appearances and scoring a seasonal-best five goals.

==== 2012–2014 ====
Diagouraga was a virtual ever-present during the 2012–13 season, making 49 appearances and scoring one goal, which came in a 2–1 win over Notts County on 29 March 2013. He signed a new two-year contract in February 2013. Diagouraga was denied promotion to the Championship due to a missed penalty from Marcello Trotta in the final game of the season versus Doncaster Rovers and defeat to Yeovil Town in the 2013 League One Playoff Final.

Now behind Adam Forshaw, George Saville and Alan McCormack in the midfield pecking order, Diagouraga featured mostly from the bench during the early stages of the 2013–14 season. He made a run of starts in late September and early October 2013, after which he returned to the bench. He received an assurance over his future from new manager Mark Warburton in January 2014, but joined League Two club Portsmouth on a one-month loan on 17 February 2014. After three appearances and receiving "good reports", Brentford manager Mark Warburton put a block on Diagouraga's loan being extended beyond 16 March. In a U-turn, it was reported on 12 March that Diagouraga's loan was expected to be extended, with a 24-hour recall clause inserted into the deal. Diagouraga was named by manager Richie Barker as captain for the final game of his initial loan, which resulted in a 3–1 defeat to Fleetwood Town on 15 March. After the match, Diagouraga reiterated his desire to stay at Fratton Park and his loan was extended until the end of the 2013–14 season on 17 March. He was recalled by Brentford on 26 March, after making eight appearances. Diagouraga made regular appearances through to the end of the season and celebrated automatic promotion to the Championship after a 1–0 victory over Preston North End on 18 April. He made 26 appearances during the 2013–14 season.

==== 2014–2016 ====
Diagouraga found himself behind Marcos Tébar and Alan McCormack in the midfield pecking order during the early months of the 2014–15 season, but he forced his way into the starting lineup in November after being challenged by Mark Warburton to earn a new contract. On 9 December, Diagouraga signed a new contract would keep him at Griffin Park until the end of the 2016–17 season. He celebrated his 200th Brentford appearance versus Leeds United at Elland Road on 7 February 2015 and assisted Alex Pritchard for the only goal of the game. On 3 May, Diagouraga was announced as the Brentford Supporters’ Player of the Year. He made 43 appearances during the 2014–15 season, which ended after the Bees fell to Middlesbrough in the playoff semi-finals.

Despite featuring as an ever-present in league matches during the first half of the 2015–16 season, Diagouraga handed in a transfer request on 11 January 2016. A new contract had gone unsigned during the previous six months, "but once the wheels were in motion about me leaving, it was hard for me to make a U-turn". Diagouraga departed Brentford on 25 January and finished his career with the club on 246 appearances and seven goals. In 2024, Diagouraga stated that "If I could turn the clock back, I probably wouldn’t have left" the club.

=== Leeds United ===
On 25 January 2016, Diagouraga joined Championship club Leeds United on a 2 1/2-year contract for an undisclosed fee, reported to be £575,000. He made his debut versus former club Brentford on 26 January, as a substitute for Luke Murphy after an hour of the 1–1 draw. He scored his first goal for the club in the following match, with what proved to be the winner in a 2–1 FA Cup fourth round victory over Bolton Wanderers. Diagouraga scored two further goals in April and finished the 2015–16 season with 19 appearances and three goals.

Diagouraga made what would prove to be his only appearance of the 2016–17 season on the opening day, with a start in a 3–0 defeat to Queens Park Rangers. He was immediately frozen out of the squad and by mid-September 2016 he was training with the club's U23 team. After failing to win a recall, Diagouraga moved on loan to Championship club Ipswich Town for the remainder of the 2016–17 season. He made 12 appearances before his spell was cut short by a groin injury.

After surprisingly appearing as a central defender early in Leeds' 2017–18 pre-season programme, Diagouraga was left out of the squad for the club's tour of Austria and failed to win a call into a first team squad before his contract was terminated by mutual consent on 25 August 2017. Diagouraga made 20 appearances and scored three goals during just over 18 months at Elland Road.

=== Plymouth Argyle ===
On 9 October 2017, Diagouraga joined League One strugglers Plymouth Argyle as a free agent and signed a contract to run until 9 January 2018. His presence in midfield brought about an upturn in the Pilgrims' form and he was offered a new 18-month contract in late December 2017. Diagouraga rejected the extension and remained at Home Park until his existing contract expired. He made 17 appearances and scored three goals for Argyle.

=== Fleetwood Town ===
Diagouraga reunited with his former Brentford manager Uwe Rösler at League One club Fleetwood Town on 10 January 2018 and signed an 18-month contract on a free transfer. Three days later, he made his debut with a start and scored the opening goal in a 2–1 victory over Southend United. Diagouraga ended the 2017–18 season with 17 appearances and one goal and was allowed to leave on a free transfer in July 2018.

=== Return to Swindon Town ===
On 18 July 2018, Diagouraga signed a two-year contract with League Two club Swindon Town on a free transfer. He made just 15 appearances during an injury-affected 2018–19 season. Frozen out by manager Richie Wellens during the first half of the 2019–20 season, Diagouraga made just two EFL Trophy appearances before his contract was terminated by mutual consent on 2 January 2020.

=== Morecambe ===
On 2 January 2020, Diagouraga joined League Two club Morecambe on a contract running until the end of the 2019–20 season, with the option of a further year. He made 12 appearances and scored one goal before the 2019–20 season was ended early. In June 2020, the option on Diagouraga's contract was taken up for 2020–21 and he made 43 appearances and scored three goals during a season which culminated in promotion to League One for the first time in the club's history. Diagouraga signed a new one-year contract in June 2021 and he made 46 appearances, scoring one goal, during a 2021–22 season in which the Shrimps narrowly avoided relegation. He was released when his contract expired.

=== Rochdale ===
On 16 June 2022, Diagouraga signed a one-year contract with League Two club Rochdale on a free transfer, effective 1 July 2022. He made 37 appearances during a disastrous 2022–23 season, in which the club was relegated into non-League football after finishing bottom of League Two. Diagouraga was released when his contract expired and though he had offers to continue playing, he elected to retire.

== Coaching career ==
While with Morecambe late in his playing career, Diagouraga assisted with coaching the club's youth team. As of June 2024, he had been running his "own private academy" in Harrogate for 2 1/2 years. Early in the 2023–24 season, as part of the Professional Player to Coach scheme, Diagouraga joined Championship club Middlesbrough as an academy coach, focusing on "one-to-one player development" between under-14 and under-18 level.

== Personal life ==
As of October 2023, Diagouraga was living in Harrogate. His son Zayden also became a footballer.

== Career statistics ==
Appearances and goals by club, season and competition
Club	Season	League			FA Cup		League cup		Other		Total	
Club	Season	Division	Apps	Goals	Apps	Goals	Apps	Goals	Apps	Goals	Apps	Goals
Watford	2005–06	Championship	1	0	1	0	2	0	0	0	4	0
Watford	2006–07	Premier League	0	0	1	0	1	0	—		2	0
Watford	Total		1	0	2	0	3	0	0	0	6	0
Swindon Town (loan)	2005–06	League One	8	0	—		—		—		8	0
Rotherham United (loan)	2006–07	League One	7	0	—		—		—		7	0
Hereford United (loan)	2007–08	League Two	41	2	6	0	2	0	1 (Note: Appearance(s) in EFL Trophy)	0	50	2
Hereford United	2008–09	League One	45	2	2	0	1	0	0	0	48	2
Hereford United	Total		86	4	8	0	3	0	1	0	98	4
Peterborough United	2009–10	Championship	19	0	0	0	4	0	—		23	0
Brentford (loan)	2009–10	League One	20	0	—		—		—		20	0
Brentford	2010–11	League One	32	1	2	0	2	0	7	0	43	1
Brentford	2011–12	League One	35	4	2	0	0	0	3	1	40	5
Brentford	2012–13	League One	39	1	5	0	1	0	4 (Note: 2 appearances in League One play-offs, 2 appearances in EFL Trophy)	0	49	1
Brentford	2013–14	League One	19	0	2	0	1	0	2	0	24	0
Brentford	2014–15	Championship	38	0	1	0	2	0	2 (Note: Appearances in Championship play-offs)	0	43	0
Brentford	2015–16	Championship	27	0	0	0	0	0	—		27	0
Brentford	Total		210	6	12	0	6	0	18	1	246	7
Portsmouth (loan)	2013–14	League Two	8	0	—		—		—		8	0
Leeds United	2015–16	Championship	17	2	2	1	—		—		19	3
Leeds United	2016–17	Championship	1	0	0	0	0	0	—		1	0
Leeds United	Total		18	2	2	1	0	0	0	0	20	3
Ipswich Town (loan)	2016–17	Championship	12	0	—		—		—		12	0
Plymouth Argyle	2017–18	League One	15	3	2	0	—		0	0	17	3
Fleetwood Town	2017–18	League One	17	1	—		—		0	0	17	1
Swindon Town	2018–19	League Two	12	0	0	0	1	0	2	0	15	0
Swindon Town	2019–20	League Two	0	0	0	0	0	0	2	0	2	0
Swindon Town	Total		20	0	0	0	1	0	4	0	25	0
Morecambe	2019–20	League Two	12	1	—		—		—		12	1
Morecambe	2020–21	League Two	36	3	0	0	3	0	4 (Note: 3 appearances in League Two play-offs, 1 appearance in EFL Trophy)	0	43	3
Morecambe	2021–22	League One	40	2	3	0	2	0	1	0	46	2
Morecambe	Total		88	6	3	0	5	0	5	0	101	6
Rochdale	2022–23	League Two	31	0	1	0	2	0	3	0	37	0
Career total			529	22	30	1	23	0	29	1	611	24

== Honours ==
Brentford

- Football League Trophy runner-up: 2010–11
- Football League One second-place promotion: 2013–14

Morecambe

- EFL League Two play-offs: 2021

Individual

- Brentford Supporters' Player of the Year: 2014–15
