= Luke Webb =

English footballer

Personal information
- Date of birth: 12 September 1986 (age 40)
- Place of birth: Nottingham, England
- Position: Centre midfielder

Youth career
- 1997–2005: Arsenal

Senior career*
Years	Team	Apps	(Gls)
2005–2006	Coventry City	0	(0)
2006–2008	Hereford United	35	(3)
- * Club domestic league appearances and goals as of 12:46, 27 December 2007

Luke Webb (born 12 September 1986 in Nottingham) is an English footballer who most recently played for Hereford United as a midfielder.

He signed for Arsenal at the age of 11 and progressed through the various youth teams. He was a regular for Arsenal U18s with 20 appearances and 2 goals in the 2004–05 season. With opportunities hard to come by, he left Highbury and had a trial with Wycombe, where he injured his ankle, before joining Coventry City for the 2005–06 season. His opportunities were again limited to reserve team football and he had a trial for Hereford after one season at Coventry. Despite a hamstring injury he impressed at Edgar Street and was signed in September 2006.

He made his first-team debut away to Wrexham, coming on as a substitute in the 1–0 defeat. On 21 November he started and scored in the 2–0 win in the FA Cup over Shrewsbury, following it up with an opening goal against Port Vale in the Second Round. In the final matches of the season, Webb forced his way into the starting XI after an injury to loanee Steve Jennings.

His 2007–08 season was curtailed by a long-term hip injury, making only 15 appearances and scoring 3 goals. He suffered a further injury setback in August 2008 and, with the club having fulfilled their contractual obligations, he was released.

Luke Webb worked at Bradfield College, Berkshire for 14 years (2009–2023) where he taught Business at A Level and was Director of Football and Head Coach. During his tenure, he developed a football education program that combined academic and athletic development and contributed to the progression of players into professional football.

In 2023, Luke moved to Repton School in Derby. In this role, he established a football partnership with Loughborough Students FC and coaches student-athletes within the school's football program.

== Footballing family ==
Luke's father is the former England midfielder Neil Webb. His brother Joshua is also a footballer, currently at Weymouth.
