= Jack Macleod =

English footballer

Personal information
- Full name: Jack Ross Macleod
- Date of birth: 3 July 1988 (age 38)
- Place of birth: Epsom, England
- Height: 5 ft 7 in (1.70 m)
- Position: Right winger

Team information
- Current team: Leatherhead

Youth career
- ?–2006: Millwall

Senior career*
Years	Team	Apps	(Gls)
2006–2007	Crawley Town	11	(0)
2007–2008	Carshalton Athletic	29	(7)
2008–2009	Hereford United	6	(0)
2009–2010	Guildford City	4	(1)
2010–2011	Leatherhead		
2011	Kingstonian		
2011– 2014	Leatherhead		
2014– 2018	Epsom Rangers FC	38	(17)
- * Club domestic league appearances and goals as of 22:26, 21 April 2009 (UTC)

Jack Ross Macleod (born 3 July 1988) is an English footballer who plays for Leatherhead of the Isthmian League Premier Division. After training in France throughout the 2020/21 season with his dog Penny, Macleod is said to be actively looking for a new club for the upcoming 2021/22 season and there is interest from a few clubs in the UK. Jack has worked on his fitness and is said to be able to run just under a mile in 5 minutes.

== Career ==
Macleod started his career at Millwall before joining Crawley Town in the summer of 2006. In March 2007 he joined Carshalton Athletic on non-contract terms.

He moved to Hereford on a free transfer in January 2008.

Macleod then signed for Leatherhead in the Isthmian League Division One South. Towards the end of the 2009–10 season playing a vital role in their bid for promotion and leading them to victory in the Isthmian League Cup. In the 2010–11 season, he helped the club reach promotion to the Isthmian League Premier Division. Macleod then signed for Kingstonian in June 2011.

Macleod finally signed for Epsom Rangers football club and was the star player throughout the 4 seasons he played there. Epsom retired his number 28 shirt when he left.
