= Marcus Palmer =

English footballer

Personal information
- Full name: Marcus James Palmer
- Date of birth: 6 January 1988 (age 38)
- Place of birth: Gloucester, England
- Position: Centre forward

Youth career
- 2000–2004: Bristol Rovers
- 2004–2006: Cheltenham Town

Senior career*
Years	Team	Apps	(Gls)
2006–2008	Hereford United	19	(5)
2008	→ Gloucester City (loan)	6	(5)
2008	Gloucester City	3	(0)
2008	Solihull Moors		
2009	Forest Green Rovers	5	(2)
2009	→ Chippenham Town (loan)		
2009	→ Evesham United (loan)		
2010	Cirencester Town		
2010–2012	Evesham United	54	(23)
2012	Stourbridge		
2012–2014	Evesham United	0	(0)
2014	→ Westfields (loan)	5	(3)
2014–2016	Westfields	17	(7)
- * Club domestic league appearances and goals as of 09:42, 24 August 2015 (UTC)

Marcus James Palmer (born 6 January 1988) is an English footballer who made four appearances in the Football League and 15 appearances in total for Hereford United helping the team gain promotion to League 1. He had to stop playing in 2016 due to a back injury.

== Career ==
Palmer was born and educated in Gloucester. As a youngster he played in the Gloucester Primary Schools' representative side, and when older he trained with Bristol Rovers. He joined Cheltenham Town's youth programme, combining studies at Hartpury College with football training; he played for Cheltenham's youth team, but failed to earn a professional contract. He was signed by Hereford in September 2006 after impressing in pre-season, after a trial at Cardiff City. He scored eight goals in reserve and Herefordshire Cup matches, including a hat-trick in the HFA Senior Floodlit Cup semi-final against Westfields.

He made his Football League debut against Swindon Town, coming on as a substitute, and made a further two appearances in the 2006–07 season, at the end of which his contract was extended for six months, and again for a further six months in January 2008. After one more first-team appearance, he joined Southern League Premier Division side Gloucester City on a month's loan in February 2008. He marked his debut the following day with a hat-trick in the 5–0 win against Rugby Town. He returned to Hereford having scored five goals from his six league appearances, but was released by Hereford at the end of the season.

Palmer agreed to spend the first month of the 2008–09 season with Gloucester City while looking at options for a return to full-time football. He played three Southern League games without scoring, then moved on to Conference North side Solihull Moors on 30 August. Palmer then left Solihull, resumed his studies at Hartpury College, and signed for Forest Green Rovers, playing in the reserve squad at The New Lawn. He was given his first team chance in March 2009 where he came off the bench against Altrincham and netted on his debut in second-half injury time. He then joined Chippenham Town on loan for the rest of the season, and just as he did for Forest Green, he scored in his opening game for the Wiltshire club.

Palmer was offered a new contract in July 2009 to stay at The New Lawn. In November, Forest Green allowed him to join Southern League Premier club Evesham United on a non-contract basis, though they retained his registration for the Conference.

In June 2010 Palmer signed for Cirencester Town. He left Cirencester however in December 2010 when he re-signed for fellow Southern Premier Division side, Evesham United. In October 2011, Palmer was the subject of a 7-day approach from Westfields.

In March 2012 he joined Stourbridge. He left the club at the end of the 2011–12 season however and re-signed for Evesham United. In June 2013, he agreed a new deal to remain with Evesham for the 2013–14 season.
