= 2009–10 Accrington Stanley F.C. season =

Accrington Stanley F.C
- Chairman: David O'Neill
- Manager: John Coleman
- League Two: 15th
- FA Cup: Third Round
- League Cup: Second Round
- Football League Trophy: North Semi Final
- Top goalscorer: League: Robert Grant (14); All: Robert Grant; Michael Symes (17)
Home colours	Away colours

This article documents the 2009–10 season of Lancashire football club Accrington Stanley. It was the team's 4th season in League Two after winning promotion from the Conference National in 2005–06.

Shareholder Ilyas Khan withdrew financial support in early October, and the debt ridden club struggled with early season form. With debts mounting, fans came to the aid of Stanley through the 'Save our Stanley' campaign. The club was forced to clear £308,000 worth of tax debt, and the club's target was reached on 3 November 2009.

After winning 7 from 8 games in League Two during midseason, Stanley found themselves challenging for a playoff spot, and reaching the 2009–10 Football League Trophy north semi-final was also a highlight. Stanley were winless from 9 games late in the season, but held 15th spot with 2 wins and a draw in the last 3 games of the season.

== Players ==
=== Current squad ===
As of 12 March 2010.

Note: Flags indicate national team as defined under FIFA eligibility rules; some limited exceptions apply. Players may hold more than one non-FIFA nationality.

No.	Pos.	Nation	Player
1	GK	AUS	Dean Bouzanis (on loan from Liverpool)
3	DF	ENG	Leam Richardson
5	DF	ENG	Darran Kempson
6	MF	ENG	Andrew Procter (captain)
7	MF	ENG	John Miles (vice captain)
8	MF	ENG	Luke Joyce
9	FW	NIR	Billy Kee (on loan from Leicester City)
11	MF	ENG	Robert Grant
12	DF	ENG	Phil Edwards
14	MF	IRL	Jimmy Ryan
15	DF	ENG	Dean Winnard
16	MF	ENG	Chris Turner
17	MF	ENG	Sean McConville

No.	Pos.	Nation	Player
18	MF	ENG	John Mullin
19	FW	ENG	Michael Symes
20	DF	ENG	Peter Murphy
24	FW	ENG	Gary King
25	GK	ENG	Ian Dunbavin
26	DF	ENG	Tom Lees (on loan from Leeds United)
27	GK	ENG	Josh Molloy
28	FW	ENG	Adam Black
29	DF	ENG	Zack Riley
30	DF	ENG	James McCarten (on loan from Everton)
31	DF	NIR	Johnny Flynn (on loan from Blackburn Rovers)
32	GK	ENG	Matthew Ince

=== Out on loan ===
Note: Flags indicate national team as defined under FIFA eligibility rules; some limited exceptions apply. Players may hold more than one non-FIFA nationality.

No.	Pos.	Nation	Player
21	MF	ENG	Alan Burton (on loan at Marine)
22	DF	ENG	Bee Ami (on loan at Radcliffe Borough)

== Pre-season ==
11 July 2009	Maidstone United	0–2	Accrington Stanley	Ashford
15:00		Report	Cavanagh 21'; Miles 85'	Stadium: The Homelands; Attendance: 213; Referee: Ian Crouch

14 July 2009	Burscough	1–1	Accrington Stanley	Burscough
19:30	Williams 62'	Report	Grant 36'	Stadium: Victoria Park

18 July 2009	FC Halifax Town	1–3	Accrington Stanley	Halifax
15:00	Dean 12'	Report	King 16'; Grant 61' 84'	Stadium: The Shay; Attendance: 600+

21 July 2009	Radcliffe Borough	0–5	Accrington Stanley	Radcliffe
19:30		Report	King; Joyce; Kee	Stadium: Stainton Park

28 July 2009	Accrington Stanley	2–2	Burnley	Accrington
19:30	Miles 39'; McConville 67'	Report	Blake 83'; Thompson 90'	Stadium: Crown Ground; Attendance: 2,672; Referee: J Moss

31 July 2009	Accrington Stanley	0–3	Blackburn Rovers	Accrington
19:30		Report	Gallagher 10' 42' 52'	Stadium: Crown Ground; Attendance: 618

== League Two ==
=== Table ===
Pos	Team	Pld	W	D	L	GF	GA	GD	Pts
13	Burton Albion	46	17	11	18	71	71	0	62
14	Bradford City	46	16	14	16	59	62	−3	62
15	Accrington Stanley	46	18	7	21	62	74	−12	61
16	Hereford United	46	17	8	21	54	65	−11	59
17	Torquay United	46	14	15	17	64	55	+9	57

Updated to match(es) played on unknown. Source: football-league.co.uk

=== Results ===
8 August 2009	Rotherham United	1–0	Accrington Stanley	Sheffield
15:00	Warne 89'	Report	Martin (yellow card) 79' (Time wasting)	Stadium: Don Valley Stadium; Attendance: 10,254; Referee: Danny McDermid

15 August 2009	Accrington Stanley	1–0	Lincoln City	Accrington
15:00	Kempson 51'	Report	Hughton (yellow card) 17' (Unsporting behaviour); Howe (yellow card) 32' (Unsporting behaviour); Heath (yellow card) 36'; Kerr (yellow card) 49'; Kovács (yellow card) 62'; Hutchinson (yellow card) 90+5' (Unsporting behaviour)	Stadium: Crown Ground; Attendance: 1,498; Referee: Langford

18 August 2009	Accrington Stanley	0–3	Northampton Town	Accrington
19:45	Joyce (yellow card) 83' (Unsporting behaviour); Ryan (penalty missed)	Report	Guinan 3'; Akinfenwa 18' (pen.); McKay 78'	Stadium: Crown Ground; Attendance: 1,561; Referee: Bratt

22 August 2009	Aldershot	3–1	Accrington Stanley	Aldershot
15:00	Donnelly 8' 90+1'; Morgan 22'; Harding (yellow card) 45+2'; Winfield (yellow card) 84'	Report	Mullin (yellow card) 45'; Edwards 48'; Procter (yellow card) 60'	Stadium: Recreation Ground; Attendance: 2,276; Referee: Jarnail Singh

29 August 2009	Accrington Stanley	1–3	Shrewsbury	Accrington
15:00	Symes 67'	Report	Leslie 18' (pen.); Elder (yellow card) 38'; Holden (yellow card) 42'; Langmead 50'; Hibbert 82'	Stadium: Crown Ground; Attendance: 1,447; Referee: Moss

5 September 2009	Bury	0–2	Accrington Stanley	Bury
15:00		Report	Grant 83' 85'	Stadium: Gigg Lane; Attendance: 3,082; Referee: Graham Salisbury

11 September 2009	Accrington Stanley	2–1	Darlington	Accrington
19:45	Procter 21'; Kee 83'	Report	Gall 59'	Stadium: Crown Ground; Attendance: 3,228; Referee: Andy Penn

19 September 2009	Hereford United	2–0	Accrington Stanley	Hereford
15:00	C. King 6'; Valentine 67'	Report	Kempson (yellow card) 16'; Lees (yellow card) 24'	Stadium: Edgar Street; Attendance: 2,013; Referee: Steve Rushton

25 September 2009	Accrington Stanley	5–3	Crewe Alexandra	Accrington
19:45	R. Grant 3' 49'; Symes 5' 77'; Procter 68'	Report	J. Grant 43' 82'; L. Murphy 90+3'	Stadium: Crown Ground; Attendance: 2,764; Referee: Steve Whitestone

29 September 2009	Port Vale	2–2	Accrington Stanley	Burslem, Stoke-on-Trent
15:00	Dodds 5'; Fraser 86'	Report	Winnard (yellow card) 37'; Edwards 82' (pen.); Procter 90'	Stadium: Vale Park; Attendance: 4,326; Referee: Darren Sheldrake

3 October 2009	Chesterfield	1–0	Accrington Stanley	Chesterfield
15:00	Page (yellow card) 26'; McDermott (yellow card) 30'; Small 90+2' (yellow card) 90+3'	Report	Kee (yellow card) 51'; Symes (yellow card) 83'; Dunbavin (yellow card) 88'	Stadium: Saltergate Recreation Ground; Attendance: 3,104; Referee: Eddie Ilderton

10 October 2009	Accrington Stanley	4–0	Cheltenham Town	Accrington
15:00	Turner 54'; Edwards 59'; Grant 62' 68'; Joyce (yellow card) 64'	Report	Low (yellow card) 77'	Stadium: Crown Ground; Attendance: 1,843; Referee: Geoff Eltringham

17 October 2009	Accrington Stanley	0–1	Bournemouth	Accrington
15:00	Symes (yellow card) 8'; Winnard (yellow card) 75'	Report	Feeney (yellow card) 30'; Pearce (yellow card) 72'; Hollands 76'	Stadium: Crown Ground; Attendance: 1,858; Referee: Michael Oliver

24 October 2009	Rochdale	1–2	Accrington Stanley	Rochdale
15:00	Dagnall 90+1'	Report	Edwards (yellow card) 39'; Kempson (yellow card) 43'; Grant 45'; Symes (yellow card) 54' (goal) 70'	Stadium: Spotland; Attendance: 3,206; Referee: Russell Booth

30 October 2009	Grimsby Town	2–2	Accrington Stanley	Cleethorpes
19:45	Forbes 14'; Sweeney (yellow card) 21'; Boshell (yellow card) 31'; Lancashire (red card) 67'; Akpa Akpro (yellow card) 74'; Conlon 90+5'	Report	King 5' (yellow card) 21'; Lees (yellow card) 13'; Joyce (yellow card) 45+1'; Edwards 68' (pen.)	Stadium: Blundell Park; Attendance: 4,325; Referee: Howard Webb

14 November 2009	Accrington Stanley	0–1	Dagenham & Redbridge	Accrington
		Report	Arber 39'	Stadium: Crown Ground; Attendance: 1,538

21 November 2009	Bradford City	1–1	Accrington Stanley	Bradford
	Edwards 21' (o.g.)	Report	Symes 56'	Stadium: Valley Parade; Attendance: 11,176; Referee: S Cook

1 December 2009	Burton Albion	0–2	Accrington Stanley	Burton upon Trent
		Report	Kee 45+1'; Symes 76'	Stadium: Pirelli Stadium; Attendance: 2,027; Referee: Paul Taylor

5 December 2009	Accrington Stanley	4–2	Torquay United	Accrington
	Edwards 39' (pen.); Procter 40'; Joyce 56'; Grant 70'	Report	Wroe 10' (pen.); Zebroski 82'	Stadium: Crown Ground; Attendance: 1,351; Referee: A Woolmer

12 December 2009	Notts County	1–2	Accrington Stanley	Nottingham
	Hughes 82' (pen.)	Report	Symes 60'; Ryan 74'	Stadium: Meadow Lane; Attendance: 5,855; Referee: M Haywood

26 December 2009	Morecambe	1–2	Accrington Stanley	Morecambe
	Hunter 68'	Report	Edwards 56', 62' (pen.)	Stadium: Christie Park; Attendance: 3,478; Referee: C Webster

28 December 2009	Accrington Stanley	2–4	Bury	Accrington
	Symes 14'; McConville 69'	Report	Jones 53'; Morrell 55', 75'; Lowe 90+3'	Stadium: Crown Ground; Attendance: 3,138; Referee: D Webb

26 January 2010	Accrington Stanley	2–1	Aldershot Town	Accrington
	Procter 30'; Kee 75'	Report	Sandell 58' (pen.)	Stadium: Crown Ground; Attendance: 1,279; Referee: Anthony Taylor

30 January 2010	Shrewsbury	0–1	Accrington Stanley	Shrewsbury
		Report	Grant 26'; Procter (yellow card) 30' (yellow-red card) 84'	Stadium: New Meadow; Attendance: 5,139; Referee: P Miller

6 February 2010	Accrington Stanley	2–1	Morecambe	Accrington
	Grant 29', 62'; Ryan 83'	Report	Artell 17', 54'	Stadium: Crown Ground; Attendance: 2,372; Referee: Neil Swarbrick

9 February 2010	Northampton Town	4–0	Accrington Stanley	Northampton
	Akinfenwa 10'; McKay 57', 61'; Guttridge 66'	Report		Stadium: Sixfields Stadium; Attendance: 3,206; Referee: James Linington

13 February 2010	Macclesfield	0–0	Accrington Stanley	Macclesfield
		Report		Stadium: Moss Rose; Attendance: 1,729; Referee: Peter Quinn

16 February 2010	Lincoln City	2–1	Accrington Stanley	Lincolnshire
	Lennnon 83'; Kempson 90+1' (o.g.)	Report	Grant 30'	Stadium: Sincil Bank; Attendance: 2,779; Referee: Shoebridge

20 February 2010	Accrington Stanley	2–0	Bradford City	Accrington
	Miles 54', 86'	Report		Stadium: Crown Ground; Attendance: 3,396; Referee: Kettle

27 February 2010	Torquay United	2–1	Accrington Stanley	Torquay
	Mansell 50'; Kempson 90+5' (o.g.)	Report	Symes 69'	Stadium: Plainmoor; Attendance: 2,503; Referee: Hooper

6 March 2010	Accrington Stanley	0–3	Notts County	Accrington
		Report	Davies 29'; Hughes 48'; Rodgers 55'	Stadium: Crown Ground; Attendance: 2,123; Referee: Hall

9 March 2010	Accrington Stanley	1–1	Macclesfield	Accrington
	Kee 65'	Report	Tipton 78' (pen.)	Stadium: Crown Ground; Attendance: 1,210; Referee: Haines

13 March 2010	Barnet	1–2	Accrington Stanley	High Barnet, London
	O'Flynn 32' (pen.); Kamdjo (red card) 80'	Report	Edwards 59'; Kee 84'; Dunbavin (red card) 20'	Stadium: Underhill Stadium; Attendance: 1,559; Referee: Cook

16 March 2010	Accrington Stanley	2–1	Rotherham United	Accrington
	Symes 18'; Ryan 79'	Report	Josh Walker 56'	Stadium: Crown Ground; Attendance: 1,440; Referee: Sutton

20 March 2010	Accrington Stanley	2–4	Rochdale	Accrington
	Symes 61' (red card) 74'; Miles 65'	Report	Jones 67', 72'; O'Grady 83'; Higginbotham 90+5'; Taylor (red card) 75'	Stadium: Crown Ground; Attendance: 3,025; Referee: Salisbury

23 March 2010	Accrington Stanley	0–2	Burton Albion	Accrington
		Report	Harrad 27'; Pearson 79'	Stadium: Crown Ground; Attendance: 1,270; Referee: Russell Booth

27 March 2010	Bournemouth	2–0	Accrington Stanley	Bournemouth
	Feeney 18'; Pitman 79'	Report		Stadium: Dean Court; Attendance: 5,413; Referee: Scott

3 April 2010	Dagenham & Redbridge	3–1	Accrington Stanley	Dagenham, London
	Benson 7'; Gain 41'; Green 53'	Report	Grant 5'	Stadium: Victoria Road; Attendance: 2,031; Referee: Ward

5 April 2010	Accrington Stanley	2–3	Grimsby Town	Accrington
	Kee 38'; Symes 44'	Report	Hudson 56'; Coulson 59'; Devitt 61'	Stadium: Crown Ground; Attendance: 1,839; Referee: Rushton

10 April 2010	Darlington	0–0	Accrington Stanley	Darlington
		Report		Stadium: The Darlington Arena; Attendance: 1,545; Referee: Woolmer

13 April 2010	Accrington Stanley	1–2	Port Vale	Accrington
19:45	Grant 52'	Report	Davies 35'; Taylor 65'	Stadium: Crown Ground; Attendance: 2,205; Referee: Moss

17 April 2010	Accrington Stanley	1–2	Hereford United	Accrington
15:00	Symes 48' (pen.)	Report	McCallum 35', 90+3'	Stadium: Crown Ground; Attendance: 1,420; Referee: Quinn

24 April 2010	Crewe Alexandra	5–1	Accrington Stanley	Crewe
15:00	Zola 5', 90+2'; Donaldson 62'; Westwood 70'; Grant 81'	Report	Brayford 65' (o.g.); Dunbavin (red card) 67'	Stadium: Gresty Road, Attendance: 3,810; Referee: Langford

27 April 2010	Accrington Stanley	1–0	Barnet	Accrington
19:45	Kee 70'	Report		Stadium: Crown Ground; Attendance: 1,268; Referee: Geoff Eltringham

1 May 2010	Accrington Stanley	2–0	Chesterfield	Accrington
15:00	Kee 70', 88'	Report		Stadium: Crown Ground; Attendance: 2,475; Referee: Haywood

8 May 2010	Cheltenham Town	1–1	Accrington Stanley	Cheltenham
15:00	Low 9'	Report	Turner 24'	Stadium: Whaddon Road; Attendance: 3,856; Referee: Darren Deadman

== League Cup ==
11 August 2009 1st Round	Accrington Stanley	2–1	Walsall	Accrington
19:45	Grant 53'; Mullin 90+1'	Report	Nicholls 9'; Weston (yellow card) 23' (yellow-red card) 35'	Stadium: Crown Ground; Attendance: 1,041; Referee: Miller

25 August 2009 2nd Round	Queens Park Rangers	2–1	Accrington Stanley	Shepherd's Bush, London
19:45	Ramage (yellow card) 28'; Ephraim 68'; Routledge 90+1'	Report	Ryan (yellow card) 38'; Symes 90+4'	Stadium: Loftus Road; Attendance: 5,203; Referee: Pawson

== Football League Trophy ==
1 September 2009 North, Round 1	Oldham Athletic	1–2	Accrington Stanley	Oldham
19:45	Whitaker 10'; Hazell (yellow card) 59'	Report	Kempson (yellow card) 19'; Gregan 60' (o.g.) (yellow card) 66'; Edwards 67'; Grant (yellow card) 90+3'	Stadium: Boundary Park; Attendance: 1,619; Referee: Tierney

6 October 2009 North, Round 2	Accrington Stanley	2–0	Shrewsbury	Accrington
19:45	Ryan (yellow card) 12'; Lees (yellow card) 45+3'; G. King 47'; Winnard 52'	Report		Stadium: Crown Ground; Attendance: 819; Referee: Scott Foster

10 November 2009 North, Q. Final	Accrington Stanley	3–2	Bury	Accrington
19:00	Symes 2', 40'; Grant (yellow card) 6' (goal) 82'; Joyce (yellow card) 62'	Report	Racchi 41'; Jones 48'; Futcher (yellow card) 71'	Stadium: Crown Ground; Attendance: 1,637; Referee: Rob Shoebridge

15 December 2009 North, Semi Final	Leeds United	2–0	Accrington Stanley	Leeds
19:45	Ephraim 9'; Kilkenny 50'	Report		Stadium: Elland Road; Attendance: 12,696; Referee: Mick Russell

== FA Cup ==
7 November 2009 1st Round	Accrington Stanley	2–1	Salisbury	Accrington
15:00		Report		Stadium: Crown Ground; Attendance: 1,379

28 November 2009 2nd Round	Accrington Stanley	2–2	Barnet	Accrington
15:00	Grant 29'; Symes 50'	Report	Yakubu 47'; O'Flynn 90' (pen.)	Stadium: Crown Ground; Attendance: 1,501; Referee: Pawson

8 December 2009 2nd Round (Replay)	Barnet	0–1	Accrington Stanley	High Barnet, London
19:45		Report	Grant 16'	Stadium: Underhill Stadium; Attendance: 1,288; Referee: Mattison

19 January 2010 3rd Round	Accrington Stanley	1–0	Gillingham	Accrington
19:45	Miles 81'	Report		Stadium: Crown Ground; Attendance: 1,322; Referee: Carl Boyeson

23 January 2010 4th Round	Accrington Stanley	1–3	Fulham	Accrington
15:00	Symes 25'; Kempson (yellow card) 27' (yellow-red card) 42'	Report	Nevland 21'; Duff 59'; Gera 80' (yellow card) 44'; Baird (yellow card) 29'	Stadium: Crown Ground; Attendance: 3,712; Referee: Atwell
