= 2009–10 Hereford United F.C. season =

Hereford United
2009–10 season
- Chairman: Graham Turner
- Manager: John Trewick (until 8 March); Graham Turner (from 8 March)
- League Two: 16th
- FA Cup: Second round
- League Cup: Second round
- Football League Trophy: Semi-finals (Southern)
- Top goalscorer: League: Marc Pugh (13); All: Marc Pugh (13)
- Highest home attendance: 3,280 v Cheltenham Town, League Two, 15 August 2009
- Lowest home attendance: 897 v Aldershot Town, Football League Trophy, 6 October 2009
- Average home league attendance: 2,108
- Biggest win: 3–0 v Rotherham United (H), League Two, 8 May 2010
- Biggest defeat: 0–5 v Notts County (A), League Two, 27 February 2010
Home colours	Away colours

The 2009–10 season was the 89th competitive season of Hereford United Football Club and 29th season overall in the Football League. The club competed in League Two, the fourth tier of English football, following their relegation from League One in the previous season. The club also competed in the FA Cup, FA Trophy and Football League Trophy.

John Trewick managed his first full season at the club, having taken charge of the club for the final two matches of the 2008–09 season. Former manager Graham Turner remained as chairman and director of football. Trewick built an almost entirely new squad, with just four players – Matt Done, Sam Gwynne, Craig Jones and Richard Rose – retained from the previous season.

The club spent the majority of the season in the bottom half of the table, and Trewick was sacked mid-season. Turner became caretaker manager until the end of the season and guided the club to a final position of 16th. Progress was made in all three cup competitions, with a run to the last eight of the Football League Trophy ending in a 4–1 home defeat to MK Dons.

This season saw a number of changes off the field. A new home and away strip was launched as the club announced a three-year deal with shirt suppliers Admiral, the away colours changing from yellow to orange. The club's shirt sponsor changed from Sun Valley to parent company Cargill. At the end of the season, Turner announced that the majority shareholding of the club was for sale, and on 4 June 2010 it was announced that he had left the club, bringing 15 years of service to an end, and that David Keyte had taken over as chairman with Tim Russon as vice-chairman.

== First-team squad ==
As of 8 May 2010

Note: Flags indicate national team as defined under FIFA eligibility rules; some limited exceptions apply. Players may hold more than one non-FIFA nationality.

No.	Pos.	Nation	Player
1	GK	ENG	Adam Bartlett (captain)
2	DF	WAL	Ryan Green
3	DF	WAL	Ryan Valentine
4	DF	ENG	Richard Rose
5	DF	ENG	Keith Lowe
6	MF	ENG	Kenny Lunt
7	MF	ENG	Marc Pugh
10	FW	ENG	Leon Constantine
12	MF	GAM	Edrissa Sonko
14	MF	NIR	James McQuilkin

No.	Pos.	Nation	Player
15	MF	ENG	Sam Gwynne
18	DF	ENG	Joel Edwards
19	MF	ENG	Craig Jones
20	DF	WAL	Darren Jones
21	MF	ENG	Tyler Weir
22	FW	FRA	Mathieu Manset
23	MF	WAL	Matt Done
30	GK	ENG	Chris Adamson
31	MF	CAN	Gavin McCallum

== Pre-season ==
Date	Opponents	H / A	Result F – A	Scorers	Attendance
9 July 2009	Pegasus Juniors	A	3 – 0	Morris 36', Gwynne 55', Tolley 65'	c. 300
13 July 2009	Bristol City	H	1 – 2	Morris 29'	823
21 July 2009	Kidderminster Harriers	A	2 – 3	Pandiani 81', Ameobi 85'	625
25 July 2009	Wolverhampton Wanderers	H	0 – 0		797
28 July 2009	Bristol Rovers	H	1 – 2	Pipe 70' (o.g.)	651
1 August 2009	Walsall	H	0 – 1		590

== League Two ==
Date	Opponents	H / A	Result F – A	Scorers	Attendance	League position
8 August 2009	Morecambe	A	2 – 2	Pugh 39', 90'	2,119	10th
15 August 2009	Cheltenham Town	H	1 – 1	Godsmark 76'	3,280	16th
18 August 2009	Bury	H	1 – 3	Constantine 15'	2,321	19th
22 August 2009	Crewe Alexandra	A	0 – 1		3,731	22nd
29 August 2009	Port Vale	H	2 – 2	Pugh 36', Plummer 80' (pen)	2,434	20th
5 September 2009	Aldershot Town	A	2 – 2	Plummer 4' (pen), 78'	3,094	21st
12 September 2009	Grimsby Town	A	0 – 1		3,173	23rd
19 September 2009	Accrington Stanley	H	2 – 0	King 6', Valentine 67'	2,013	20th
26 September 2009	Rochdale	A	1 – 4	Pugh 23'	2,620	21st
29 September 2009	Bournemouth	H	2 – 1	Pugh 50', 77'	2,104	18th
3 October 2009	Dagenham & Redbridge	H	1 – 1	Walker 80'	2,253	20th
10 October 2009	Rotherham United	A	1 – 1	McCallum 90'	3,452	20th
17 October 2009	Chesterfield	H	1 – 0	Valentine 58' (pen)	2,574	18th
24 October 2009	Bradford City	A	0 – 1		11,107	19th
31 October 2009	Darlington	H	2 – 1	Lowe 41', D. Jones 47'	2,238	17th
14 November 2009	Barnet	A	0 – 0		1,965	16th
21 November 2009	Burton Albion	A	2 – 3	Constantine 61', 76'	2,796	18th
24 November 2009	Shrewsbury Town	H	2 – 1	Valentine 5' (pen), McCallum 30'	2,913	16th
1 December 2009	Northampton Town	A	3 – 1	D. Jones 16', Manset 57', King 74'	3,524	14th
5 December 2009	Notts County	H	0 – 2		2,727	17th
12 December 2009	Macclesfield Town	H	1 – 3	Constantine 90'	1,406	17th
26 December 2009	Torquay United	A	0 – 1		3,792	19th
19 January 2010	Crewe Alexandra	H	1 – 1	Constantine 42'	1,367	19th
23 January 2010	Bury	A	0 – 1		2,797	20th
30 January 2010	Port Vale	A	0 – 2		4,686	21st
2 February 2010	Lincoln City	H	2 – 0	McCallum 29', 55'	1,429	18th
6 February 2010	Torquay United	H	1 – 0	McCallum 22'	2,123	18th
13 February 2010	Shrewsbury Town	A	1 – 3	Constantine 5'	6,098	18th
16 February 2010	Aldershot Town	H	2 – 0	McCallum 27', Blackburn 35' (o.g.)	1,576	16th
20 February 2010	Burton Albion	H	3 – 4	Pugh 28', Lunt 55', McQuilkin 59'	2,253	17th
23 February 2010	Northampton Town	H	0 – 2		1,266	18th
27 February 2010	Notts County	A	0 – 5		6,036	18th
2 March 2010	Cheltenham Town	A	1 – 0	Green 25'	3,273	17th
6 March 2010	Macclesfield Town	H	0 – 2		1,919	18th
12 March 2010	Lincoln City	A	1 – 3	Pugh 42'	6,012	18th
16 March 2010	Morecambe	H	0 – 1		1,208	20th
20 March 2010	Bradford City	H	2 – 0	Manset 33', Jervis 81'	1,926	19th
27 March 2010	Chesterfield	A	2 – 1	Jervis 48' (pen), Pugh 63'	3,593	17th
3 April 2010	Barnet	H	2 – 1	McQuilkin 29', Breen 69' (o.g.)	2,146	17th
5 April 2010	Darlington	A	1 – 0	Pugh 74'	2,131	16th
10 April 2010	Grimsby Town	H	0 – 1		2,143	16th
13 April 2010	Bournemouth	A	1 – 2	Pugh 90'	6,128	18th
17 April 2010	Accrington Stanley	A	2 – 1	McCallum 35', 90'	1,420	17th
24 April 2010	Rochdale	H	2 – 1	King 52', Valentine 61'	1,975	15th
1 May 2010	Dagenham & Redbridge	A	1 – 2	Pugh 62'	2,663	17th
8 May 2010	Rotherham United	H	3 – 0	Manset 4', D. Jones 21', Pugh 90'	3,005	16th

== FA Cup ==
Date	Round	Opponents	H / A	Result F – A	Scorers	Attendance
7 November 2009	First Round	Sutton United	H	2 – 0	Manset 6', Valentine 86' (pen)	1,713
28 November 2009	Second Round	Colchester United	H	0 – 1		2,225

== League Cup ==
Date	Round	Opponents	H / A	Result F – A	Scorers	Attendance
11 August 2009	First Round	Charlton Athletic	H	1 – 0 AET	Godsmark 98'	2,017
25 August 2009	Second Round	Portsmouth	A	1 – 4	Plummer (pen) 62'	6,645

== Football League Trophy ==
Hereford United will enter the Football League Trophy at the first round stage. The first-round match will be played during the week commencing 31 August 2009.

Date	Round	Opponents	H / A	Result F – A	Scorers	Attendance
1 September 2009	First Round (South)	Bristol Rovers	H	0 – 0 (4 – 2 on pens)		970
6 October 2009	Second Round (South)	Aldershot Town	H	2 – 2 (4 – 3 on pens)	Walker 42', Manset 89'	897
10 November 2009	Quarter Final (South)	Leyton Orient	A	1 – 1 (3 – 2 on pens)	Constantine 25'	1,282
15 December 2009	Semi Final (South)	Milton Keynes Dons	H	1 – 4	Constantine 63'	1,367

== Herefordshire Senior Cup ==
The format of the Herefordshire Senior Cup was changed from a knockout competition to a one-off final: the winners of the County Challenge Cup play Hereford United in a pre-season match.

Date	Round	Opponents	H / A	Result F – A	Scorers	Attendance
4 November 2008	Final	Wellington	A	8 – 0	Constantine 8' (pen), 37', Pugh 35', Ameobi 62', 84', Morris 66', 67', Lunt 89'	c. 250

== Squad statistics ==
No.	Pos.	Name	League		FA Cup		League Cup		FL Trophy		HFA Cup		Total		Discipline	
No.	Pos.	Name	Apps	Goals	Apps	Goals	Apps	Goals	Apps	Goals	Apps	Goals	Apps	Goals	Yellow card	Red card
1	GK	(England) Adam Bartlett	46	0	2	0	2	0	4	0	1	0	55	0	0	0
2	DF	(Wales) Ryan Green	31	1	1	0	2	0	2	0	1	0	37	1	2	1
3	DF	(Wales) Ryan Valentine	40	4	2	1	1	0	1	0	1	0	45	5	12	2
4	DF	(England) Richard Rose	25	0	0	0	2	0	3	0	1	0	31	0	1	0
5	DF	(England) Keith Lowe	19	1	2	0	1	0	3	0	1	0	26	1	0	0
6	MF	(England) Kenny Lunt	42	1	2	0	2	0	4	0	1	1	51	2	3	0
7	MF	(England) Marc Pugh	40	13	2	0	2	0	3	0	1	1	48	14	1	0
8	MF	(England) Glen Southam	6	0	0	0	2	0	1	0	0	0	9	0	2	0
8	MF	(England) Jordon Mutch	3	0	1	0	0	0	1	0	0	0	5	0	1	0
8	FW	(England) Lateef Elford-Alliyu	1	0	0	0	0	0	0	0	0	0	1	0	0	0
8	FW	(England) Lewis Young	6	0	0	0	0	0	0	0	0	0	6	0	0	0
9	FW	(England) Lee Morris	11	0	0	0	1	0	1	0	1	2	14	2	0	0
10	FW	(England) Leon Constantine	35	6	1	0	1	0	3	2	1	2	41	10	0	0
11	MF	(Wales) Jamie Tolley	10	0	0	0	1	0	2	0	1	0	14	0	2	0
12	MF	(The Gambia) Edrissa Sonko	10	0	1	0	0	0	2	0	0	0	13	0	1	0
14	MF	(Northern Ireland) James McQuilkin	22	2	0	0	1	0	0	0	0	0	23	2	1	1
15	MF	(England) Sam Gwynne	26	0	0	0	2	0	2	0	0	0	30	0	5	0
16	MF	(England) Jonny Godsmark	8	1	1	0	2	1	2	0	0	0	13	2	1	0
16	DF	(England) Paul Downing	6	0	0	0	0	0	0	0	0	0	6	0	1	1
17	DF	(Republic of Ireland) Darren Dennehy	7	0	0	0	2	0	1	0	0	0	10	0	2	0
17	DF	(England) Dan Preston	4	0	0	0	0	0	0	0	0	0	4	0	1	0
18	DF	(England) Joel Edwards	0	0	0	0	0	0	0	0	0	0	0	0	0	0
19	MF	(Wales) Craig Jones	1	0	0	0	1	0	0	0	0	0	2	0	1	0
20	DF	(Wales) Darren Jones	41	3	2	0	1	0	3	0	1	0	48	3	6	0
21	MF	(England) Tyler Weir	3	0	0	0	0	0	1	0	0	0	4	0	0	0
22	FW	(France) Mathieu Manset	28	3	2	1	0	0	2	1	0	0	32	5	3	1
23	MF	(England) Matt Done	19	0	1	0	1	0	3	0	0	0	24	0	0	0
26	FW	(England) Craig King	26	3	2	0	0	0	2	0	0	0	30	3	0	0
27	DF	(England) Danny Blanchett	13	0	2	0	0	0	1	0	0	0	16	0	0	0
27	FW	(England) Jake Jervis	7	2	0	0	0	0	0	0	0	0	7	2	2	0
28	MF	(England) Mark Marshall	8	0	0	0	0	0	2	0	0	0	10	0	1	0
28	MF	(Sweden) Astrit Ajdarević	1	0	0	0	0	0	0	0	0	0	1	0	0	0
29	FW	(England) James Walker	6	1	0	0	0	0	1	1	0	0	7	2	0	0
29	MF	(England) Nathaniel Wedderburn	3	0	0	0	0	0	0	0	0	0	3	0	0	0
30	GK	(England) Chris Adamson	1	0	0	0	0	0	0	0	0	0	1	0	0	1
31	MF	(Canada) Gavin McCallum	28	8	2	0	0	0	2	0	0	0	32	8	2	0
33	FW	(England) Tristan Plummer	5	3	0	0	1	1	1	0	0	0	7	4	1	0
34	FW	(England) Marlon Jackson	5	0	0	0	1	0	1	0	0	0	7	0	0	0
–	MF	(Cameroon) Marc Manga	0	0	0	0	0	0	0	0	1	0	1	0	0	0
–	FW	(England) Tomi Ameobi	0	0	0	0	0	0	0	0	1	2	1	2	0	0

== Transfers ==
=== In ===
Date	Pos.	Name	Previous club	Fee	Contract
2009-05-22	DF	(England) Keith Lowe	Kidderminster Harriers	Free	One year
2009-05-29	DF	(Wales) Ryan Valentine	Darlington	Free	One year
2009-06-05	DF	(Wales) Ryan Green	Bristol Rovers	Free	One year
2009-06-09	DF	(Wales) Darren Jones	Forest Green Rovers	Free	Unknown
2009-06-22	GK	(England) Adam Bartlett	Kidderminster Harriers	Free	Unknown
2009-06-22	MF	(England) Glen Southam	Dagenham & Redbridge	Free	Unknown
2009-06-23	MF	(England) Kenny Lunt	Sheffield Wednesday	Free	Unknown
2009-06-23	MF	(Wales) Jamie Tolley	Macclesfield Town	Free	Unknown
2009-06-29	FW	(England) Leon Constantine	Northampton Town	Free	One year
2009-06-30	MF	(England) Marc Pugh	Shrewsbury Town	Free	One year
2009-07-25	FW	(England) Lee Morris	Burton Albion	Free	One year
2009-09-20	MF	(The Gambia) Edrissa Sonko	Tranmere Rovers	Free	One year

=== Out ===
Date	Pos.	Name	Next Club	Fee
2009-06-17	MF	(France) Toumani Diagouraga	Peterborough United	Undisclosed*

(*) fee believed to be in the region of £200,000.

=== Loan in ===
Date From	Date To	Position	Name	From
2009-07-09	2010-01-09	DF	(Republic of Ireland) Darren Dennehy	Cardiff City
2009-08-06	2009-01-06	MF	(England) Jonny Godsmark	Newcastle United
2009-08-21	2009-09-21	FW	(England) Tristan Plummer	Bristol City
2009-08-21	2009-09-21	FW	(England) Marlon Jackson	Bristol City
2009-09-17	2009-10-17	MF	(England) Mark Marshall	Swindon Town
2009-09-17	2009-10-17	DF	(England) Danny Blanchett	Peterborough United
2009-09-17	2009-10-17	FW	(Scotland) Craig King	Leicester City
