= Hudson-Odoi =

Hudson-Odoi is a surname. Notable people with the surname include:

- Bradley Hudson-Odoi (born 1988), Ghanaian footballer
- Callum Hudson-Odoi (born 2000), English footballer, brother of Bradley
