= Sam Oji =

English footballer (1985–2021)

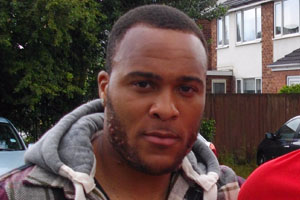
- Oji in 2012

Personal information
- Full name: Samuel Udoka Oji
- Date of birth: 9 October 1985
- Place of birth: Westminster, England
- Date of death: 28 August 2021 (aged 35)
- Height: 6 ft 1 in (1.85 m)
- Position: Centre-back

Youth career
- 2000–2004: Arsenal

Senior career*
| Years | Team | Apps | (Gls) |
| 2004–2008 | Birmingham City | 0 | (0) |
| 2005–2006 | → Doncaster Rovers (loan) | 4 | (0) |
| 2007 | → Bristol Rovers (loan) | 5 | (0) |
| 2007 | → Leyton Orient (loan) | 2 | (0) |
| 2008 | Leyton Orient | 11 | (0) |
| 2008–2009 | Hereford United | 4 | (0) |
| 2009 | Ljungskile SK | 5 | (0) |
| 2011–2013 | Tamworth | 39 | (2) |
| 2013–2014 | Limerick | 34 | (0) |
| 2015–2016 | Galway United | 23 | (2) |
| 2016–2017 | Worcester City | 25 | (0) |
| 2017–2018 | Hednesford Town | 38 | (2) |
| 2018–2021 | Highgate United | | |

Managerial career
- 2021: Highgate United (assistant)
- * Club domestic league appearances and goals

Samuel Udoka Oji (9 October 1985 – 28 August 2021) was an English professional footballer who played as a centre-back.

Oji played in the Football League for Doncaster Rovers, Bristol Rovers, Leyton Orient and Hereford United, and in the Swedish Superettan for Ljungskile SK, before knee injuries kept him out of football for two years. He resumed his career with Tamworth of the Conference Premier. He then played in the League of Ireland for Limerick and Galway United and in non-league football for Worcester City and Hednesford Town. Oji joined Highgate United in 2018, and was appointed assistant manager of that club in July 2021.

== Life and career ==
Oji was born in Westminster, London. He was a cousin of R&B/soul singer Lemar. He began his football career as a youth player at Arsenal.

=== Birmingham City ===
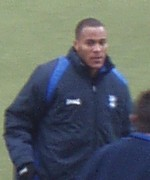
Oji training with Birmingham City in 2006

Oji signed a full-time contract with Birmingham City for the start of the 2004–05 season. In 2005–06 he spent six weeks on loan at Doncaster Rovers, for whom he made his debut in the Football League as a 75th-minute substitute for Ricky Ravenhill in a 1–0 away loss against Gillingham on 6 December.

On 7 February 2006 he made his only first-team appearance for Birmingham, in an FA Cup fourth round replay at home to Reading. He came on as a last-minute substitute for Stephen Clemence in a 2–1 win.

A year later he joined Bristol Rovers on a month's loan, later extended to two months. In the summer of 2007 he had a trial with Southend United, then in August signed for Leyton Orient on a month's loan, later extended to three months.

=== Leyton Orient ===
With six months remaining on his contract, Oji left Birmingham by mutual consent on 8 January 2008 and joined Leyton Orient until the end of the 2007–08 season. He was released by Orient at the end of the season.

=== Hereford United ===
Oji signed for League One club Hereford United on 7 August 2008. After five games for the club he suffered a knee injury which kept him out of training for four months; he never regained his first-team place and at the end of his short-term contract, in February 2009, he was released.

=== Ljungskile SK ===
In March 2009 Oji joined Ljungskile SK of the Superettan (Swedish second division) after a successful trial. He played only six league games for Ljungskile before leaving in June. In August, Oji had a trial with Tranmere Rovers, but cruciate ligament injuries suffered while on trials with Turkish Süper Lig side Diyarbakirspor and with Leyton Orient kept him out of football for two years.

=== Tamworth ===
In December 2011, Oji signed for Conference Premier club Tamworth. He made his debut as a second-half substitute in the first match of 2012, a 2–2 draw at home to Alfreton Town. He was sent off for two bookable offences in a league match against Fleetwood Town on 4 February 2012.

=== League of Ireland ===
Oji signed for League of Ireland club Limerick on 26 August 2013, and made his debut for the club in a 2–0 away defeat to Sligo Rovers. In February 2015, he moved to Galway United in the same league. Oji played for Galway in the 2015 League of Ireland Cup final, losing on penalties to St Patrick’s Athletic.

=== Return to England ===
Worcester City signed Oji ahead of the opening fixture of the 2016–17 National League North season. The following summer he moved to Northern Premier League Premier Division club Hednesford Town. He made 41 appearances over the season, of which 38 were in league competition, before signing for Highgate United of the Midland League Premier Division in July 2018.

Oji was appointed assistant to Simon Johnson, new manager of Highgate United, on 20 July 2021.

== Death ==
Oji died on 28 August 2021 at the age of 35; a day earlier, Highgate United had stated that he was "extremely ill". He was married and had two children.
