= Tristan Plummer =

English footballer (born 1990)

Personal information
- Full name: Tristan Daine Plummer
- Date of birth: 30 January 1990 (age 36)
- Place of birth: Bristol, England
- Position: Winger

Team information
- Current team: FC Bristol

Youth career
- 200?–2007: Bristol City

Senior career*
Years	Team	Apps	(Gls)
2007–2010	Bristol City	0	(0)
2008	→ Luton Town (loan)	5	(0)
2009	→ Torquay United (loan)	1	(0)
2009	→ Hereford United (loan)	5	(3)
2010	→ Gillingham (loan)	2	(0)
2011–2012	Portimonense	4	(0)
2012	Hereford United	3	(0)
2013–2014	Weston-super-Mare	21	(5)
2014–2015	Aldershot Town	14	(1)
2014	→ Weymouth (loan)	2	(1)
2015	Weston-super-Mare	3	(2)
2015	Aldershot Town	11	(3)
2015–2016	Weston-super-Mare	34	(4)
2016–2017	Hereford	?	(7)
2017–2018	Weston-super-Mare	35	(1)
2018–2019	Frome Town	12	(0)
2019–	Real St George		

International career
2007	England U16	2	(1)
2008	England U17	22	(0)
	England U18	2	(0)
- * Club domestic league appearances and goals as of 18:17, 22 May 2018 (UTC)

Tristan Daine Plummer (born 30 January 1990) is an English professional footballer who plays for Bitton. He is the younger brother of Dwayne Plummer.

== Career ==
Born in Bristol, Plummer began his career as a trainee with Bristol City and while a trainee was linked with a move to Arsenal. However, reports that Arsenal were attempting to sign Plummer were ruled out by Bristol City chairman Stephen Lansdown in December 2006. Plummer turned professional in January 2007, but failed to break into the City first team. He joined League Two side Luton Town on loan in August 2008. He made his debut in a 3–1 defeat to Port Vale on 9 August 2008. He then joined Torquay United on loan on 2 January 2009 for the remainder of the 2008–09 season, but played just once before ending his loan early, after one month.

Plummer joined League Two side Hereford United on an initial one-month loan on 21 August 2009, alongside his clubmate and fellow young striker Marlon Jackson.

On 21 January 2010 he joined Gillingham on loan for a month, making two appearances.

After dropping out of professional football for a season, Plummer joined Portimonense S.C. of the Portuguese second division in July 2011. On 14 August 2011, Plummer scored the winning goal in a Portuguese league cup match against Freamunde, winning the game 3–2.

During pre-season Tristan had a trial with 2.Bundesliga side DSC Arminia Bielefeld which was ultimately unsuccessful. He subsequently signed with the Conference South team Weston-super-Mare.

Plummer ended his short spell with the South-West side to join Conference Premier side Aldershot Town in the January transfer window of 2014. He netted three goals in the latter half of the season before rejoining Weston-super-Mare for the 2015/16 season. In January 2016, Plummer scored an 89th-minute equaliser in a 5–5 draw with Hemel Hempstead Town in the Conference South. Plummer scored in three consecutive games, helping the Seagulls in their late fight for survival, eventually finishing 16th.

On 7 August 2016, Plummer signed for Southern League South and West side Hereford.

Bitton announced on 22 July 2019, that Plummer had joined the club.

Most recently Plummer made a shock appearance for Real St George FC, coming on against Bradley Stoke Town A' making the Jubilee Centre look like a carpet scoring 3 goals and assisting 2 others.

== Career statistics ==
As of match played 23 February 2018

Appearances and goals by club, season and competition
Club	Season	League			National Cup		League Cup		Other		Total	
Club	Season	Division	Apps	Goals	Apps	Goals	Apps	Goals	Apps	Goals	Apps	Goals
Luton Town (loan)	2008–09	League Two	5	0	0	0	2	1	1 (Note: Appearances in the Football League Trophy)	0	8	1
Hereford United (loan)	2009–10	League Two	5	3	0	0	1	1	1	0	7	4
Gillingham (loan)	2009–10	League One	2	0	0	0	—		0	0	2	0
Portimonense	2011–12	Liga de Honra	4	0	0	0	4	1	0	0	8	1
Hereford United	2012–13	Conference Premier	3	0	0	0	—		0	0	3	0
Weston-super-Mare	2013–14	Conference South	21	5	2	0	–		4 (Note: Appearances in the FA Trophy)	2	27	7
Aldershot Town	2013–14	Conference Premier	6	1	0	0	–		0	0	6	1
Aldershot Town	2014–15	Conference Premier	8	0	2	0	–		0	0	10	0
Aldershot Town	Aldershot total		14	1	2	0	0	0	0	0	16	1
Weymouth (loan)	2014–15	SFL – Premier Division	2	1	—		—		5 (Note: Four appearances and a goal in the FA Trophy; one appearance in the SFL League Cup)	1	7	2
Weston-super-Mare	2014–15	Conference South	3	2	—		—		0	0	3	2
Aldershot Town	2014–15	Conference Premier	11	2	0	0	—		0	0	11	2
Weston-super-Mare	2015–16	Conference South	34	4	1	0	—		1	0	36	4
Hereford	2016–17	SFL – Div 1, South & West	?	7	?	?	—		?	1	?	8
Weston-super-Mare	2017–18	Conference South	35	1	0	0	—		2	0	37	1
Career total			130	26	5	0	7	3	14	4	147	33
