= 2002–03 Leeds United A.F.C. season =

2002–03 season of Leeds United

Leeds United
2002–03 season
- Chairman: Peter Ridsdale (until 31 March); Professor John McKenzie (from 31 March)
- Manager: Terry Venables (until 21 March); Peter Reid (from 21 March)
- Stadium: Elland Road
- Premier League: 15th
- FA Cup: Sixth round
- League Cup: Third round
- UEFA Cup: Third round
- Top goalscorer: League: Mark Viduka (20); All: Mark Viduka (22)
- Highest home attendance: 40,205 vs Aston Villa (11 May 2003, Premier League)
- Lowest home attendance: 29,359 vs Gillingham (4 February 2003, FA Cup)
- Average home league attendance: 37,768

The 2002–03 season saw Leeds United competing in the Premier League (known as the FA Barclaycard Premiership for sponsorship reasons) and the UEFA Cup.

== Competitions ==
=== Premier League ===
==== League table ====
| Pos | Team | Pld | W | D | L | GF | GA | GD | Pts |
|---|---|---|---|---|---|---|---|---|---|
| 13 | Birmingham City | 38 | 13 | 9 | 16 | 41 | 49 | −8 | 48 |
| 14 | Fulham | 38 | 13 | 9 | 16 | 41 | 50 | −9 | 48 |
| 15 | Leeds United | 38 | 14 | 5 | 19 | 58 | 57 | +1 | 47 |
| 16 | Aston Villa | 38 | 12 | 9 | 17 | 42 | 47 | −5 | 45 |
| 17 | Bolton Wanderers | 38 | 10 | 14 | 14 | 41 | 51 | −10 | 44 |

Source: Premier League
Rules for classification: 1) points; 2) goal difference; 3) number of goals scored.

==== Results by round ====
| Round | 1 | 2 | 3 | 4 | 5 | 6 | 7 | 8 | 9 | 10 | 11 | 12 | 13 | 14 | 15 | 16 | 17 | 18 | 19 | 20 | 21 | 22 | 23 | 24 | 25 | 26 | 27 | 28 | 29 | 30 | 31 | 32 | 33 | 34 | 35 | 36 | 37 | 38 |
|---|---|---|---|---|---|---|---|---|---|---|---|---|---|---|---|---|---|---|---|---|---|---|---|---|---|---|---|---|---|---|---|---|---|---|---|---|---|---|
| Ground | H | A | H | A | A | H | A | H | A | H | A | H | A | H | A | H | A | A | H | A | H | H | A | H | A | A | H | H | A | H | A | A | H | A | H | H | A | H |
| Result | W | W | L | L | W | W | L | L | D | L | D | L | W | L | L | L | L | W | D | W | W | W | L | D | L | L | W | L | L | L | L | W | D | L | W | L | W | W |
| Position | 3 | 1 | 5 | 5 | 3 | 3 | 5 | 7 | 9 | 10 | 12 | 13 | 10 | 10 | 14 | 16 | 16 | 16 | 16 | 14 | 13 | 12 | 13 | 12 | 13 | 14 | 14 | 14 | 15 | 15 | 16 | 14 | 13 | 16 | 15 | 16 | 16 | 15 |

Source: Statto.com
A = Away; H = Home; W = Win; D = Draw; L = Loss

==== Matches ====
| 17 August 2002 1 | Leeds United | 3–0 | Manchester City | Leeds |
| 15:00 | Barmby 15'; Viduka 45'; Keane 80' | Report | | Stadium: Elland Road; Attendance: 40,195; Referee: Graham Poll |

| 24 August 2002 2 | West Bromwich Albion | 1–3 | Leeds United | West Bromwich |
| | Marshall 90' | Report | Kewell 39'; Bowyer 52'; Viduka 70' | Stadium: The Hawthorns; Attendance: 26,618; Referee: Steve Dunn |

| 28 August 2002 3 | Leeds United | 0–1 | Sunderland | Leeds |
| | | Report | McAteer 45' | Stadium: Elland Road; Attendance: 39,929; Referee: Mark Halsey |

| 31 August 2002 4 | Birmingham City | 2–1 | Leeds United | Birmingham |
| | Devlin 32'; Johnson 58' | Report | Bowyer 50' | Stadium: St Andrew's; Attendance: 27,164; Referee: Paul Durkin |

| 11 September 2002 5 | Newcastle United | 0–2 | Leeds United | Newcastle |
| | | Report | Viduka 5'; Smith 67' | Stadium: St. James' Park; Attendance: 51,730; Referee: Dermot Gallagher |

| 14 September 2002 6 | Leeds United | 1–0 | Manchester United | Leeds |
| | Kewell 67' | Report | | Stadium: Elland Road; Attendance: 39,622; Referee: Jeff Winter |

| 22 September 2002 7 | Blackburn Rovers | 1–0 | Leeds United | Blackburn |
| | Flitcroft 24' | Report | | Stadium: Ewood Park; Attendance: 25,415; Referee: Graham Poll |

| 28 September 2002 8 | Leeds United | 1–4 | Arsenal | Leeds |
| | Kewell 84' | Report | Kanu 9', 86'; Touré 20'; Henry 47' | Stadium: Elland Road; Attendance: 40,199; Referee: Alan Wiley |

| 6 October 2002 9 | Aston Villa | 0–0 | Leeds United | Birmingham |
| | | Report | | Stadium: Villa Park; Attendance: 33,505; Referee: Mark Halsey |

| 19 October 2002 10 | Leeds United | 0–1 | Liverpool | Leeds |
| | | Report | Diao 66' | Stadium: Elland Road; Attendance: 40,187; Referee: Steve Dunn |

| 28 October 2002 11 | Middlesbrough | 2–2 | Leeds United | Middlesbrough |
| | Job 25'; Southgate 83' | Report | Viduka 11' (pen.); Bowyer 56' | Stadium: Riverside Stadium; Attendance: 34,723; Referee: Rob Styles |

| 3 November 2002 12 | Leeds United | 0–1 | Everton | Leeds |
| | | Report | Rooney 80' | Stadium: Elland Road; Attendance: 40,161; Referee: Neale Barry |

| 10 November 2002 13 | West Ham United | 3–4 | Leeds United | Newham |
| | Di Canio 21', 50' (pen.); Sinclair 74' | Report | Barmby 11'; Kewell 28', 41'; Viduka 45' | Stadium: Upton Park; Attendance: 33,297; Referee: Steve Dunn |

| 17 November 2002 14 | Leeds United | 2–4 | Bolton Wanderers | Leeds |
| 16:00 | Smith 4'; Kewell 84' | Report | Pedersen 3', 90'; Djorkaeff 80'; Ricketts 89' (pen.) | Stadium: Elland Road; Attendance: 36,627; Referee: Alan Wiley |

| 24 November 2002 15 | Tottenham Hotspur | 2–0 | Leeds United | Tottenham |
| | Sheringham 12'; Keane 41' | Report | | Stadium: White Hart Lane; Attendance: 35,718; Referee: Steve Bennett |

| 1 December 2002 16 | Leeds United | 1–2 | Charlton Athletic | Leeds |
| 16:00 | Kewell 42' | Report | Lisbie 80'; Parker 90' | Stadium: Elland Road; Attendance: 35,537; Referee: Andy D'Urso |

| 7 December 2002 17 | Fulham | 1–0 | Leeds United | Loftus Road |
| | Djetou 10' | Report | | Stadium: Fulham; Attendance: 17,494; Referee: Paul Durkin |

| 16 December 2002 18 | Bolton Wanderers | 0–3 | Leeds United | Bolton |
| | | Report | Mills 12'; Fowler 16'; Wilcox 75' | Stadium: Reebok Stadium; Attendance: 23,378; Referee: Graham Poll |

| 21 December 2002 19 | Leeds United | 1–1 | Southampton | Leeds |
| 15:00 | Kewell 74' | Report | Fernandes 89' | Stadium: Elland Road; Attendance: 36,687; Referee: Chris Foy |

| 26 December 2002 20 | Sunderland | 1–2 | Leeds United | Sunderland |
| | Proctor 34' | Report | Milner 51'; Fowler 80' (pen.) | Stadium: Stadium of Light; Attendance: 44,029; Referee: Mike Dean |

| 28 December 2002 21 | Leeds United | 2–0 | Chelsea | Leeds |
| 15:00 | Woodgate 30'; Milner 45' | Report | | Stadium: Elland Road; Attendance: 40,122; Referee: Graham Barber |

| 1 January 2003 22 | Leeds United | 2–0 | Birmingham City | Leeds |
| | Bakke 6'; Viduka 67' | Report | | Stadium: Elland Road; Attendance: 40,034; Referee: Phil Dowd |

| 11 January 2003 23 | Manchester City | 2–1 | Leeds United | Manchester |
| 15:00 | Goater 29'; Jensen 50' | Report | Kewell 90' | Stadium: Maine Road; Attendance: 34,884; Referee: Rob Styles |

| 18 January 2003 24 | Leeds United | 0–0 | West Bromwich Albion | Leeds |
| | | Report | | Stadium: Elland Road; Attendance: 39,708; Referee: Uriah Rennie |

| 28 January 2003 25 | Chelsea | 3–2 | Leeds United | Fulham |
| | Guðjohnsen 57'; Lampard 80'; Matteo 83' (o.g.) | Report | Kewell 17'; Lučić 66' | Stadium: Stamford Bridge; Attendance: 39,738; Referee: Jeff Winter |

| 1 February 2003 26 | Everton | 2–0 | Leeds United | Liverpool |
| | Unsworth 56' (pen.); Radzinski 68' | Report | | Stadium: Goodison Park; Attendance: 40,153; Referee: Mark Halsey |

| 8 February 2003 27 | Leeds United | 1–0 | West Ham United | Leeds |
| | Johnson 20' | Report | | Stadium: Elland Road; Attendance: 40,126; Referee: Dermot Gallagher |

| 22 February 2003 28 | Leeds United | 0–3 | Newcastle United | Leeds |
| | | Report | Dyer 17', 48'; Shearer 54' | Stadium: Elland Road; Attendance: 40,025; Referee: Alan Wiley |

| 5 March 2003 29 | Manchester United | 2–1 | Leeds United | Manchester |
| | Radebe 20' (o.g.); Silvestre 79' | Report | Viduka 64' | Stadium: Old Trafford; Attendance: 67,135; Referee: Graham Poll |

| 15 March 2003 30 | Leeds United | 2–3 | Middlesbrough | Leeds |
| | Viduka 24', 76' | Report | Maccarone 36' (pen.); Juninho 45'; Geremi 64' | Stadium: Elland Road; Attendance: 39,073; Referee: David Elleray |

| 23 March 2003 31 | Liverpool | 3–1 | Leeds United | Liverpool |
| | Owen 12'; Murphy 20'; Gerrard 73' | Report | Viduka 44' | Stadium: Anfield; Attendance: 43,021; Referee: Andy D'Urso |

| 5 April 2003 32 | Charlton Athletic | 1–6 | Leeds United | London |
| | Euell 45' | Report | Kewell 12', 76'; Harte 34' (pen.); Viduka 42', 53', 56' (pen.) | Stadium: The Valley; Attendance: 26,274; Referee: Eddie Wolstenholme |

| 12 April 2003 33 | Leeds United | 2–2 | Tottenham Hotspur | Leeds |
| | Viduka 31', 76' (pen.) | Report | Sheringham 37'; Keane 39' | Stadium: Elland Road; Attendance: 39,560; Referee: Rob Styles |

| 19 April 2003 34 | Southampton | 3–2 | Leeds United | Hampshire |
| | Ormerod 31'; Beattie 45'; Svensson 54' | Report | Kewell 80'; Barmby 90' | Stadium: St. Mary's Stadium; Attendance: 32,032; Referee: Mark Halsey |

| 22 April 2003 35 | Leeds United | 2–0 | Fulham | Leeds |
| | Viduka 4', 49' | Report | | Stadium: Elland Road; Attendance: 37,220; Referee: Neale Barry |

| 26 April 2003 36 | Leeds United | 2–3 | Blackburn Rovers | Leeds |
| | Viduka 21'; Smith 90' | Report | Dunn 38' (pen.); Cole 69'; Todd 78' | Stadium: Elland Road; Attendance: 38,062; Referee: Paul Durkin |

| 4 May 2003 37 | Arsenal | 2–3 | Leeds United | Highbury |
| | Henry 31'; Bergkamp 53' | Report | Kewell 5'; Harte 48'; Viduka 88' | Stadium: Highbury; Attendance: 38,127; Referee: Alan Wiley |

| 11 May 2003 38 | Leeds United | 3–1 | Aston Villa | Leeds |
| | Harte 8'; Barmby 81'; Viduka 90' | Report | Guðjónsson 40' | Stadium: Elland Road; Attendance: 40,205; Referee: Mark Halsey |

=== FA Cup ===
| 4 January 2003 3 | Scunthorpe United | 0–2 | Leeds United | Scunthorpe |
| | | Report | Viduka 31' (pen.); Bakke 68' | Stadium: Glanford Park; Attendance: 8,329; Referee: Alan Wiley |

| 25 January 2003 4 | Gillingham | 1–1 | Leeds United | Gillingham |
| | Sidibé 82' | Report | Smith 49' | Stadium: Priestfield Stadium; Attendance: 11,093; Referee: Neale Barry |

| 4 February 2003 Replay | Leeds United | 2–1 | Gillingham | Leeds |
| | Viduka 11'; Bakke 60' | Report | Ipoua 86' | Stadium: Elland Road; Attendance: 29,359; Referee: Mike Dean |

| 16 February 2003 5 | Crystal Palace | 1–2 | Leeds United | Selhurst |
| | Gray 34' | Report | Kelly 32'; Kewell 72' | Stadium: Selhurst Park; Attendance: 24,512; Referee: Dermot Gallagher |

| 9 March 2003 6 | Sheffield United | 1–0 | Leeds United | Sheffield |
| 11:30 | Kabba 78' | Report | | Stadium: Bramall Lane; Attendance: 24,633; Referee: Steve Bennett |

=== League Cup ===
| 6 November 2002 3 | Sheffield United | 2–1 | Leeds United | Sheffield |
| | Jagielka 90'; Ndlovu 90' | Report | Yates 24' (o.g.) | Stadium: Bramall Lane; Attendance: 26,633; Referee: Jeff Winter |

=== UEFA Cup ===
==== First round ====
| 19 September 2002 | Leeds United | 1–0 | Metalurh Zaporizhya | Leeds |
| | Smith 79' | Report | | Stadium: Elland Road; Attendance: 30,000; Referee: Mikko Vuorela (Finland) |

| 3 October 2002 | Metalurh Zaporizhya | 1–1 (1–2 agg.) | Leeds United | Zaporizhzhia |
| | Modebadze 24' | Report | Barmby 77' | Stadium: Avto ZAZ Stadium; Attendance: 7,000; Referee: Muhittin Bosat (Turkey) |

==== Second round ====
| 31 October 2002 | Leeds United | 1–0 | Hapoel Tel Aviv | Leeds |
| | Kewell 81' | Report | | Stadium: Elland Road; Attendance: 31,867; Referee: Jack Van Hulten (Netherlands) |

| 14 November 2002 | Hapoel Tel Aviv | 1–4 (1–5 agg.) | Leeds United | Florence |
| | Abukasis 2' | Report | Smith 30', 54', 63', 83' | Stadium: Stadio Artemio Franchi; Attendance: 3,000; Referee: Fritz Stuchlik (Austria) |

==== Third round ====
| 28 November 2002 | Málaga | 0–0 | Leeds United | Málaga |
| | | Report | | Stadium: La Rosaleda Stadium; Attendance: 35,000; Referee: Alfredo Trentalange (Italy) |

| 12 December 2002 | Leeds United | 1–2 (1–2 agg.) | Málaga | Leeds |
| | Bakke 22' | Report | Dely Valdés 13', 79' | Stadium: Elland Road; Attendance: 34,123; Referee: Massimo Busacca (Switzerland) |

== Statistics ==
| No. | Pos. | Name | League | | FA Cup | | League Cup | | UEFA Cup | | Total | | Discipline | |
| No. | Pos. | Name | Apps | Goals | Apps | Goals | Apps | Goals | Apps | Goals | Apps | Goals | Yellow card | Red card |
|---|---|---|---|---|---|---|---|---|---|---|---|---|---|---|
| 2 | DF | (Republic of Ireland) Gary Kelly | 24+1 | 0 | 4 | 1 | 0 | 0 | 6 | 0 | 35 | 1 | 0 | 0 |
| 3 | DF | (Republic of Ireland) Ian Harte | 24+3 | 3 | 3 | 0 | 1 | 0 | 5 | 0 | 36 | 3 | 3 | 0 |
| 4 | MF | (France) Olivier Dacourt | 4+3 | 0 | 0 | 0 | 2 | 0 | 2 | 0 | 9 | 0 | 2 | 0 |
| 5 | DF | (South Africa) Lucas Radebe | 16+3 | 0 | 4 | 0 | 0 | 0 | 3 | 0 | 26 | 0 | 1 | 0 |
| 6 | DF | (England) Jonathan Woodgate | 18 | 1 | 1 | 0 | 1 | 0 | 4 | 0 | 24 | 1 | 2 | 0 |
| 7 | FW | (Republic of Ireland) Robbie Keane | 0+3 | 1 | 0 | 0 | 0 | 0 | 0 | 0 | 3 | 1 | 0 | 0 |
| 8 | FW | (England) Michael Bridges | 1+4 | 0 | 0 | 0 | 0+1 | 0 | 1+2 | 0 | 9 | 0 | 0 | 0 |
| 9 | FW | (Australia) Mark Viduka | 29+4 | 20 | 4 | 2 | 1 | 0 | 1 | 0 | 40 | 22 | 5 | 0 |
| 10 | FW | (Australia) Harry Kewell | 31 | 14 | 4 | 1 | 1 | 0 | 5 | 1 | 41 | 16 | 3 | 0 |
| 11 | MF | (England) Lee Bowyer | 15 | 3 | 1 | 0 | 1 | 0 | 5 | 0 | 22 | 3 | 7 | 0 |
| 11 | DF | (Spain) Raúl Bravo | 5 | 0 | 1 | 0 | 0 | 0 | 0 | 0 | 6 | 0 | 1 | 0 |
| 12 | MF | (England) Nick Barmby | 16+3 | 4 | 0+2 | 0 | 1 | 0 | 3 | 1 | 25 | 5 | 2 | 0 |
| 13 | GK | (England) Paul Robinson | 38 | 0 | 5 | 0 | 1 | 0 | 6 | 0 | 50 | 0 | 0 | 0 |
| 14 | MF | (Republic of Ireland) Stephen McPhail | 7+6 | 0 | 0 | 0 | 0+1 | 0 | 2+3 | 0 | 19 | 0 | 1 | 0 |
| 15 | DF | (Sweden) Teddy Lučić | 16+1 | 1 | 2+1 | 0 | 1 | 0 | 0 | 0 | 21 | 1 | 1 | 0 |
| 16 | MF | (England) Jason Wilcox | 23+2 | 1 | 4 | 0 | 1 | 0 | 3 | 0 | 33 | 1 | 4 | 0 |
| 17 | FW | (England) Alan Smith | 33 | 3 | 4 | 1 | 0 | 0 | 6 | 5 | 43 | 9 | 11 | 2 |
| 18 | DF | (England) Danny Mills | 32+1 | 1 | 4 | 0 | 1 | 0 | 2+1 | 0 | 41 | 1 | 5 | 0 |
| 19 | MF | (Norway) Eirik Bakke | 31+3 | 1 | 3+1 | 2 | 1 | 0 | 6 | 1 | 45 | 4 | 10 | 0 |
| 20 | MF | (England) Seth Johnson | 3+6 | 1 | 3+1 | 0 | 0 | 0 | 0 | 0 | 13 | 1 | 1 | 0 |
| 21 | DF | (Scotland) Dominic Matteo | 20 | 0 | 3 | 0 | 0 | 0 | 1 | 0 | 24 | 0 | 3 | 0 |
| 22 | DF | (England) Michael Duberry | 11+3 | 0 | 1+1 | 0 | 0+1 | 0 | 3+1 | 0 | 21 | 1 | 0 | 0 |
| 24 | MF | (Australia) Paul Okon | 15 | 0 | 5 | 0 | 1 | 0 | 1 | 0 | 21 | 0 | 4 | 0 |
| 25 | MF | (Australia) Jacob Burns | 2 | 0 | 0 | 0 | 0 | 0 | 0 | 0 | 0 | 0 | 2 | 0 |
| 27 | FW | (England) Robbie Fowler | 2+6 | 2 | 0+1 | 0 | 0 | 0 | 0+1 | 0 | 10 | 2 | 1 | 0 |
| 28 | MF | (Australia) Jamie McMaster | 0+4 | 0 | 0 | 0 | 0 | 0 | 0 | 0 | 4 | 0 | 0 | 0 |
| 34 | DF | (England) Frazer Richardson | 0 | 0 | 0 | 0 | 0 | 0 | 0+1 | 0 | 1 | 0 | 0 | 0 |
| 36 | DF | (England) Matthew Kilgallon | 0+2 | 0 | 0 | 0 | 0 | 0 | 0 | 0 | 2 | 0 | 0 | 0 |
| 38 | MF | (England) James Milner | 1+17 | 2 | 0+4 | 0 | 0 | 0 | 0 | 0 | 22 | 2 | 0 | 0 |
| 39 | FW | (England) Simon Johnson | 1+3 | 0 | 0 | 0 | 0 | 0 | 0 | 0 | 4 | 0 | 0 | 0 |

== Transfers ==
=== In ===
| Date | Pos. | Name | From | Fee | Ref. |
|---|---|---|---|---|---|
| 8 August 2002 | MF | (England) Nick Barmby | (England) Liverpool | £2,750,000 | |
| 12 August 2002 | DF | (Australia) Paul Okon | (England) Middlesbrough | Free | |

=== Out ===
| Date | Pos. | Name | To | Fee | Ref. |
|---|---|---|---|---|---|
| 22 July 2002 | DF | (England) Rio Ferdinand | (England) Manchester United | £30,000,000 | |
| 31 August 2002 | FW | (Republic of Ireland) Robbie Keane | (England) Tottenham Hotspur | £7,000,000 | |
| 11 January 2003 | MF | (England) Lee Bowyer | (England) West Ham United | £100,000 | |
| 31 January 2003 | DF | (England) Jonathan Woodgate | (England) Newcastle United | £9,000,000 | |
| 13 February 2003 | FW | (England) Robbie Fowler | (England) Manchester City | £6,000,000 | |
| 14 February 2003 | FW | (Republic of Ireland) Caleb Folan | (England) Chesterfield | Free | |

=== Loan in ===
| Date from | Date to | Pos. | Name | From | Ref. |
|---|---|---|---|---|---|
| 31 August 2002 | 30 June 2003 | DF | (Sweden) Teddy Lučić | (Sweden) AIK | |
| 1 January 2003 | 30 June 2003 | DF | (Spain) Raúl Bravo | (Spain) Real Madrid | |

=== Loan out ===
| Date from | Date to | Pos. | Name | To | Ref. |
|---|---|---|---|---|---|
| 11 August 2002 | 12 October 2002 | FW | (England) Simon Johnson | (England) Hull City | |
| 1 July 2002 | 30 June 2003 | GK | (England) Shaun Allaway | (England) Grimsby Town | |
| 1 November 2002 | 1 December 2002 | GK | (Australia) Danny Milosevic | (England) Plymouth Argyle | |
| 1 November 2002 | 1 December 2002 | MF | (England) Harpal Singh | (England) Bradford City | |
| 1 November 2002 | 1 December 2002 | DF | (Australia) Shane Cansdell-Sherriff | (England) Rochdale | |
| 13 December 2002 | 30 June 2003 | FW | (Wales) Craig Stiens | (Wales) Swansea City | |
| 9 January 2003 | 30 June 2003 | MF | (France) Olivier Dacourt | (Italy) Roma | |
| 10 January 2003 | 10 March 2003 | DF | (England) Frazer Richardson | (England) Stoke City | |
| 1 January 2003 | 1 May 2003 | GK | (Australia) Danny Milosevic | (England) Crewe Alexandra | |
| 15 February 2003 | 17 March 2003 | DF | (England) Tom Newey | (England) Darlington | |
