= Darran Kempson =

English footballer (born 1984)

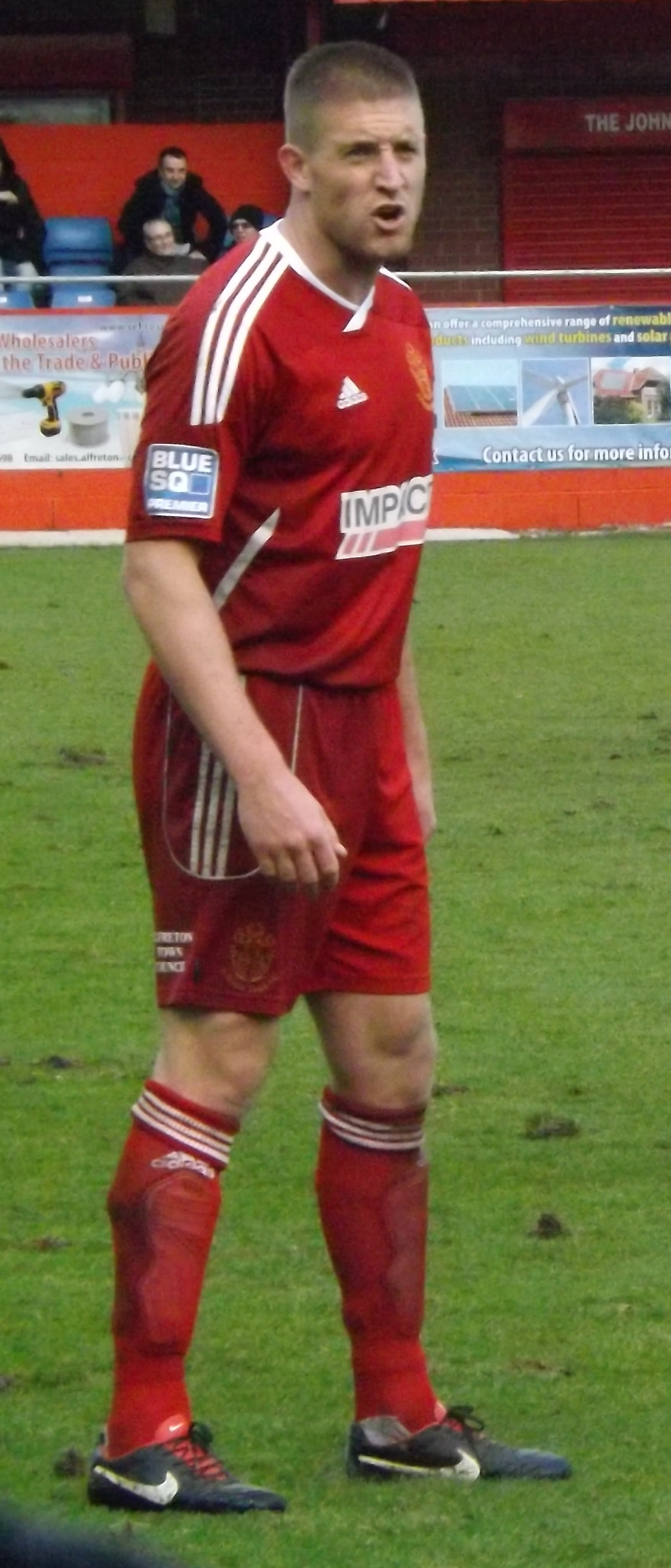
- Kempson playing for Alfreton Town in 2013

Personal information
- Full name: Darran Kaya Kempson
- Date of birth: 6 December 1984 (age 41)
- Place of birth: Blackpool, England
- Height: 6 ft 4 in (1.93 m)
- Position: Defender

Senior career*
Years	Team	Apps	(Gls)
2003–2005	Preston North End	0	(0)
2004	→ Accrington Stanley (loan)	11	(1)
2004–2005	→ Morecambe (loan)	7	(1)
2005–2006	Morecambe	44	(1)
2006–2007	Crewe Alexandra	7	(0)
2007	→ Bury (loan)	12	(0)
2007–2008	Shrewsbury Town	23	(0)
2008	→ Accrington Stanley (loan)	8	(1)
2008–2009	Wrexham	15	(0)
2008–2009	→ Forest Green Rovers (loan)	5	(0)
2009–2010	Accrington Stanley	40	(1)
2010–2011	Grimsby Town	53	(1)
2012–2014	Alfreton Town	65	(2)
Total		290	(8)
- * Club domestic league appearances and goals as of 06:59, 31 December 2016 (UTC)

Darran Kempson (born 6 December 1984) is an English former professional footballer who played as a defender from 2003 to 2014.

He played for Preston North End, Accrington Stanley, Morecambe, Crewe Alexandra, Bury, Shrewsbury Town, Wrexham, Forest Green Rovers, Grimsby Town and Alfreton Town.

== Personal life ==
Kempson attended Manor Beach Primary School and Millfield High School in Thornton Cleveleys area, Blackpool. after leaving school he was given the chance as a trainee with Preston North End.

== Career ==
=== Preston North End ===
The central defender started his career at Preston North End as a trainee, but didn't play a game for The Lilywhites. He was given a loan spell at Accrington Stanley from February 2004, making his début in Accrington's 3–2 defeat to Dagenham & Redbridge. Kempson went on to play a further 10 appearances for Accrington, scoring one goal, which was in the 3–1 defeat to Margate.

Kempson got a second loan spell away from Deepdale at the end of December 2004. This time, Kempson was loaned out to Morecambe, where he made seven appearances and scored a single goal.

=== Morecambe ===
Kempson managed to impress Morecambe manager Jim Harvey and secured a permanent deal at Christie Park. Kempson played a further 44 appearances for The Shrimps and helping them to the Conference Play-offs. A starting regular under Jim Harvey at Morecambe, Kempson was mainly used a substitute under Sammy McIlroy, and decided not to renew his contract with the Shrimps.

=== Crewe Alexandra ===
Kempson then had a successful trial with Crewe Alexandra, and subsequently signed for the club in the summer of 2006. He played seven games for the Railwaymen, making his début in the 2–2 draw with Northampton. Following a short loan spell which saw him end the 2006–07 season at Bury.

=== Shrewsbury Town ===
Kempson followed teammate Darren Moss to Shrewsbury Town in the summer of 2007 .His Shrewsbury début came in the 4–0 away win at Lincoln City on the opening day of the 2007–08 season. He scored his first goal for the club in the League Cup – the winner against Championship club Colchester United – three days later. It was the first competitive goal at the New Meadow. He joined Accrington Stanley on loan on 29 February 2008, but was recalled by the Shrews early to play in their last few games of the season. Kempson was not a regular in the first team at Shrewsbury and in July 2008, was told that he did not figure in manager Paul Simpson's immediate plans, being left behind as the club travelled to Spain on a pre-season training camp.

=== Wrexham ===
He joined newly relegated Wrexham on a two-year contract. During his first season at Wrexham first team manager 'Brian Little' was sacked. Dean Saunders was appointed and Darran found himself out of favour and needing first team football. During the 2008–2009 season he had a brief loan spell at Forest Green Rovers under his former manager at Morecambe, Jim Harvey. During this period at Forest Green Rovers he played in several key fixtures for the club including their FA cup third round match against Derby County but left in January 2009 to fight for a place back at Wrexham.

=== Accrington Stanley ===
On 21 July Kempson rejoined Accrington Stanley after mutually agreeing to leave Wrexham. He scored the winning goal for Accrington Stanley, in the first game of the 2009/10 season, to beat Lincoln City 1–0. After an 18-month period where his career had arguably faulted, Darran now looks to be getting back on track after a number of battling performances at the heart of the Stanley defence.

=== Grimsby Town ===
On 3 June 2010. Kempson signed with Grimsby Town on a 2-year contract. Throughout his first season at Blundell Park he partnered Rob Atkinson and Steven Watt and became an integral part of the club's defence in Neil Woods side. Woods was replaced in February and Kempson was made club captain by the incoming management duo of Rob Scott and Paul Hurst. His captaincy continued into the 2011–12 season but amidst rumours of a training ground bust up Kempson was released by Grimsby on 18 December 2011 following the club's 4–3 victory over Ebbsfleet United having his contract cancelled by mutual consent.

=== Alfreton Town ===
On 7 January 2012 it was announced that Kempson had joined Scottish club Dunfermline Athletic on trial. After failing to earn a contract with Dunfermline, Kempson returned to England and the Conference National by signing for Alfreton Town until the end of the season. He was made captain, and after playing a key role in helping Alfreton to avoid relegation he was rewarded with a new two-year contract on 23 May.

== Honours ==
=== Grimsby Town ===
- Lincolnshire Senior Cup: Winner, 2011–12

=== Shrewsbury Town ===
- Shropshire Senior Cup: Winner, 2007–08
