= Michael Symes =

English footballer (born 1983)

Personal information
- Full name: Michael Symes
- Date of birth: 31 October 1983 (age 42)
- Place of birth: Great Yarmouth, England
- Position: Striker

Youth career
- 1994–2002: Everton

Senior career*
Years	Team	Apps	(Gls)
2002–2004	Everton	0	(0)
2004	→ Crewe Alexandra (loan)	4	(1)
2004–2006	Bradford City	15	(3)
2006	→ Macclesfield Town (loan)	0	(0)
2006	→ Stockport County (loan)	1	(0)
2006	→ Shrewsbury Town (loan)	2	(1)
2006–2009	Shrewsbury Town	60	(13)
2008	→ Macclesfield Town (loan)	14	(1)
2008	→ AFC Bournemouth (loan)	5	(0)
2009	→ Accrington Stanley (loan)	7	(1)
2009–2010	Accrington Stanley	41	(13)
2010–2012	AFC Bournemouth	37	(11)
2012	→ Rochdale (loan)	15	(4)
2012–2013	Leyton Orient	13	(1)
2013	→ Burton Albion (loan)	15	(4)
2013–2014	Burton Albion	13	(2)
2015	Southport	2	(0)
Total		244	(55)
- * Club domestic league appearances and goals

Michael Symes (born 31 October 1983) is an English former professional footballer who played as a striker.

He started his career as a trainee with Everton, playing in attack with future England international Wayne Rooney. He moved to Bradford City after he failed to break into the Everton side but after two injury-ravaged seasons with Bradford he moved to Shrewsbury Town, following a short loan spell. He spent three seasons with Shrewsbury, then joined Accrington Stanley in July 2009 after a loan period the previous season.

His most successful campaign in terms of goals was with Accrington, which resulted in a summer move to newly promoted AFC Bournemouth in 2010. After two years there, he moved on to Leyton Orient, then Burton Albion, initially on a temporary deal, before being released in 2014. He played two matches for Southport in 2015.

== Career ==
=== Everton ===
Symes was born in Great Yarmouth, East Anglia, but moved to Liverpool as a young child, he attended St John's Junior School before moving on to Holy Rosary / Maricourt High School. Symes started his career as a trainee at his boyhood heroes, Everton, with whom he reached the final of the 2002 FA Youth Cup, playing up-front with Wayne Rooney. Symes scored 31 goals from 51 games at youth level for Everton, including 5 goals in 9 games for the reserves, however injuries over the next season and a half restricted his progress to the Everton first team. In March 2004, he joined Crewe Alexandra on loan for the rest of the 2003–04 season making his debut as a substitute against Nottingham Forest on 27 March. He played four games during his loan spell, starting once against Coventry City when he scored his first senior goal in a 3–1 win.

=== Bradford City ===
Crewe manager Dario Gradi decided not to offer a contract to Symes, who instead spent a period on trial at Bradford City, which included an 8–1 pre-season friendly win over Farsley Celtic. He signed for the League One side in July 2004 with fellow former Everton trainee Steven Schumacher, with whom he lived during his spell at Bradford. Symes made his Bradford debut in a 2–1 defeat at Hartlepool United on the opening day of the 2004–05 season. Three days later he missed a late penalty which would have secured Bradford victory over Peterborough United in a game in which Symes was also booked. Symes was dropped from the first team after Bradford signed Dele Adebola. When Bradford were allowed special dispensation to sign Neil Roberts, Bradford tried to give Symes a loan transfer to Darlington but the deal was blocked by the Football League. The following month, Symes scored his first goals for Bradford when he came off the bench at half-time to score twice in a 3–1 victory over Sheffield Wednesday on 23 October 2004. They were the only goals he scored that season from just 15 games.

Before the following season started, Symes was loaned out to Macclesfield Town for six months, but in July he suffered an ankle injury keeping him out until September. He never played for Macclesfield meaning his action in 2005 was limited to just 35 minutes on New Year's Day. Instead he joined Stockport County in another loan deal in January 2006, where he made his one and only appearance in a 1–1 draw with Torquay United on 31 January 2006. He returned to Bradford and played another three games, scoring in a 1–1 draw with Brentford on 8 April 2006. However his season again ended early when he pulled his hamstring during the draw with Brentford. Symes later admitted "it never happened" for him at City and that his confidence was shattered by manager Colin Todd.

=== Shrewsbury Town ===
At the start of the 2006–07 season, Symes was kept on at Bradford but started the season on loan at Shrewsbury Town. He made his Town debut as a late substitute in the opening game of the season in a 2–2 draw with Mansfield Town. He scored in his second appearance, when he again came on as substitute, as Shrewsbury defeated Boston United 5–0. He started his first game in the League Cup against Birmingham City as Shrewsbury lost 1–0. His move from Bradford was made permanent by the end of the August transfer window. He had started just six games in two seasons with Bradford. He scored the second brace of his career to give Shrewsbury a 2–1 victory over Hereford United in the Football League Trophy first round, a competition in which Shrewsbury eventually reached the southern section semi-final stage. In January 2007, his contract was extended further, lasting until summer 2009. He scored 13 goals in his first season at Shrewsbury, but was also given the first red card of his career in a game against Mansfield Town, as they missed out on promotion when they lost 3–1 to Bristol Rovers in the play-off final at Wembley Stadium.

Symes was not a regular in the Shrewsbury side at the start of the 2007–08 season, making 12 starts and nine substitute appearances as he scored just three goals. In January 2008, he rejoined Macclesfield Town with defender Neil Ashton on loan until the end of the season. Despite his exit, Shrewsbury manager Gary Peters said the pair could both return to Shrewsbury at the end of the season. He played his first Macclesfield game in a 1–0 defeat to Peterborough on 12 January, and scored his first goal as Macclesfield drew 1–1 with Milton Keynes Dons on 29 January. It was his only goal in his first eight games and he was dropped for Macclesfield's 3–0 defeat against Peterborough on 23 February when he came on as a substitute in the 44th minute. He returned to the side a week later for new manager Keith Alexander's first match against Notts County when Macclesfield were denied a victory by a late goal from Richard Butcher. While Symes was on loan at Macclesfield, Shrewsbury manager Peters left the club and was replaced with Paul Simpson, who promised Symes and other players out on loan that he would monitor their progress and build his own opinion of them. Macclesfield were involved in a relegation fight during Symes' stay and it was not until a 1–0 victory over Chesterfield on the penultimate weekend of the season that Macclesfield ensured they would be in the league the following season. Symes played 14 games, four as substitute, but scored just one goal during his stay with Macclesfield.

Symes returned to Shrewsbury and started pre-season training ahead of the 2008–09 season, having been told by Simpson that he would be given the same chance as any other player at Shrewsbury to impress, and also personally vowing to force his way into the manager's first-team plans. However, Simpson signed new strikers during the summer including Grant Holt, who cost a club record £170,000, and Symes spent the start of the season out of the team. After scoring six goals in two consecutive reserve games, Symes earned his first game for the first team, when he came off the bench to score a late equaliser and earn Shrewsbury a 2–2 draw with Notts County on 30 August. After starting in a 2–1 Football League Trophy victory against Exeter City, he was again sidelined when he picked up a knee injury. He returned to action in mid-October, when he came on as substitute to give Shrewsbury a late equaliser against Port Vale, only for Vale to score another goal to give them victory.

In November 2008, he was again sent out on loan, this time to AFC Bournemouth, also in League Two, for one month. Simpson said: "We have a big squad and I felt that the opportunity for Michael to go and get a month out on loan at Bournemouth would do him the world of good." Symes made his debut for Bournemouth on 15 November, as they lost 3–0 to Accrington Stanley. He returned to Shrewsbury at the end of his month loan spell, in which he failed to score from five appearances. He was immediately recalled to the Shrewsbury squad and came on as a second-half substitute in a 1–0 defeat to league leaders Wycombe Wanderers the following weekend. Because of injury problems, Symes played only three more games, before he moved on loan, this time to Accrington Stanley, another League Two side. He made his Accrington debut the day following his transfer, helping them to a 2–1 victory at home to Exeter City. Symes scored with a headed goal to give Accrington a 1–0 victory against Grimsby Town, which proved to be the only goal he recorded in seven games for Accrington, before he returned to Shrewsbury Town at the end of the season. However, he was one of seven players released by Simpson after they lost the play-off final.

=== Accrington Stanley ===
As a result of his loan spell at Accrington, Symes was one of five signings made by their manager John Coleman on the same day at the start of pre-season training in July 2009. Symes scored his first goal of the new season with a late consolation goal for Accrington in a 2–1 League Cup defeat to Queens Park Rangers, before scoring his first league goal later the same week against former team Shrewsbury Town but in another defeat. After an improved run of form, Symes' first two-goal haul for Accrington in a 5–3 victory over another of his former teams, Crewe Alexandra, helped his new side into the top-half of the League Two table. Symes also scored goals in the FA Cup and the Football League Trophy, helping Accrington to the third round of the former competition and into the northern zone semi-finals against Leeds United in the latter.

His goals helped Symes land December's League Two Player of the Month and an offer of a contract extension by Accrington to fend off reported interest from other clubs during the January 2010 transfer window. However, Symes announced he would not sign a new contract during the transfer window increasing the chance he could leave on a free transfer during the summer on a Bosman ruling transfer. Two weeks later, Accrington announced they had rejected two bids from fellow League Two side Grimsby Town for their striker. One bid included striker Barry Conlon moving in the opposite direction. The second bid was reported to be a six-figure sum. Symes continued his rich vein of form as his 14th goal of the season—making it his most productive season to date—levelled the scoring against Premier League Fulham in the FA Cup fourth round. A victory would have given Stanley a fifth round place for the first time in their history, but they eventually lost 3–1. In the crowd at the club's following game was Preston North End's new manager Darren Ferguson to become Symes' latest suitor. Despite the interest in Symes, no further bids were reported by Accrington for him or for midfielder Bobby Grant as the January transfer window closed. Symes finished the season with 19 goals—his best return of his career to that point—with 13 of those coming in the league.

=== AFC Bournemouth ===
With his contract at Accrington having expired, Symes turned down Accrington's contract offer and instead rejoined Bournemouth on 4 June 2010 ahead of their first season back in League One. Symes was one of three players signed on the same day—they were Bournemouth's first permanent signings in 17 months after the Football League lifted the club's transfer embargo.

Symes was injured during pre-season but made his second Bournemouth debut on the opening day of the 2010–11 season against Charlton Athletic as a half-time substitute. Bournemouth lost the game 1–0 but played against ten men for the last half-hour after defender José Semedo was sent off for a bad tackle on Symes. He was again a substitute for his side's League Cup match before he made his first start the following weekend as Bournemouth defeated Peterborough United 5–1 and a week later he scored his first Bournemouth goal with a penalty in a 3–0 win against Tranmere Rovers. However, Symes soon suffered a shoulder injury, which required specialist treatment and kept him out for nearly a month. With Bournemouth's form pushing them towards the top of the league, Symes admitted he would have to prove himself again to manager Eddie Howe. Bournemouth, however, suffered a number of injuries to strikers, and they risked bringing Symes back early. He was brought on as a half-time substitute against Carlisle United and helped lead his side to a 2–0 victory by scoring the second goal. He instantly won a place in Bournemouth's starting team and followed up his goal-scoring performance by netting twice against Exeter City to put Bournemouth second in the table. He soon spent another six weeks on the sidelines because of a shoulder injury before returning in November. His injury problems continued during the winter and he struggled to gain a run of games in the team meaning he did not score again until February at which point he scored in three successive matches.

On the final day of the January 2012 transfer deadline window, Symes rejoined his former Accrington manager John Coleman by joining Rochdale on loan for the rest of the season. He made his debut on 14 February, replacing Ashley Grimes in the 58th minute of a 1–0 loss to Scunthorpe United at Glanford Park. His first goals for the Dale came on 17 March in a 3–2 win over neighbours Oldham Athletic, a hat-trick concluding with a penalty which he won after being fouled by James Tarkowski. Two weeks later, he scored the only other goal of his 15-match loan spell, an 82nd-minute penalty in a 3–3 draw with Walsall at Spotland, having earlier missed an open goal when set up by Jean-Louis Akpa Akpro. On 14 May, he was one of four players released by new Bournemouth manager Paul Groves.

=== Leyton Orient / Burton Albion ===
On 28 June 2012, Mathieu Baudry, Symes completed a free transfer to fellow League One club Leyton Orient on a two-year deal after being released by Bournemouth. On 14 August, he made his debut in the first round of the League Cup away to Charlton Athletic, replacing David Mooney in the 64th minute of a 1–1 draw at The Valley and converting his attempt in the subsequent penalty shootout which his team won 4–3. Four days later on his league debut, he replaced Kevin Lisbie with 21 minutes remaining and scored a penalty consolation in a 3–1 loss at Tranmere Rovers. On 5 December, he scored his only other goal for the O's, another penalty to confirm a 3–0 win at Northampton Town in the second round of the Football League Trophy, seven minutes after replacing Mooney.

Symes was loaned to League Two Burton Albion on 31 January 2013, until the end of the season. He made his debut two days later, away to bottom-placed AFC Wimbledon, and equalised for a 1–1 draw in the 36th minute. He scored 4 goals in 15 appearances as the team made the play-offs, being eliminated by his former employers Bradford.

On 29 July 2013, Symes signed a permanent deal for Burton. He came on as a 78th-minute substitute for Rene Howe in a League Cup second-round game against Championship team Fulham at the Pirelli Stadium on 27 August, and nearly scored the winning goal, which was disallowed for offside. When the game finished 1–1 after 90 minutes, he headed the Brewers into the lead in the 102nd, and when it finished 2–2 and went to penalties, he scored the first attempt although his team lost 5–4 nonetheless. On 28 May 2014, he was released by manager Gary Rowett.

Returning to Merseyside, Symes played two matches as late substitute for Southport in the Conference in April 2015, his debut coming on the 3rd, when he replaced Richard Brodie for the final 13 minutes of a 2–0 loss at Altrincham. Eight days later, he came on at the same point for a loss by the same score at Bristol Rovers.

== Career statistics ==
Appearances and goals by club, season and competition
Club	Season	League			FA Cup		League Cup		Other		Total	
Club	Season	Division	Apps	Goals	Apps	Goals	Apps	Goals	Apps	Goals	Apps	Goals
Everton	2003–04	Premier League	0	0	0	0	0	0	—		0	0
Crewe Alexandra (loan)	2003–04	Division One	4	1	0	0	0	0	—		4	1
Bradford City	2004–05	League One	12	2	1	0	1	0	1 (Note: Appearances in Football League Trophy)	0	15	2
Bradford City	2005–06	League One	3	1	0	0	0	0	0	0	3	1
Bradford City	Total		15	3	1	0	1	0	1	0	18	3
Macclesfield Town (loan)	2005–06	League Two	0	0	0	0	0	0	0	0	0	0
Stockport County (loan)	2005–06	League Two	1	0	0	0	0	0	0	0	1	0
Shrewsbury Town	2006–07 (Note: Part of this season was spent on loan)	League Two	33	9	2	0	1	0	7 (Note: Four appearances four goals in Football League Trophy, three appearances in League Two play-offs)	4	43	13
Shrewsbury Town	2007–08	League Two	21	3	1	0	2	0	1	0	25	3
Shrewsbury Town	2008–09	League Two	8	2	1	0	0	0	2	0	11	2
Shrewsbury Town	Total		62	14	4	0	3	0	10	4	79	18
Macclesfield Town (loan)	2007–08	League Two	14	1	0	0	0	0	0	0	14	1
AFC Bournemouth (loan)	2008–09	League Two	5	0	0	0	0	0	0	0	5	0
Accrington Stanley	2008–09 (Note: This season was spent on loan)	League Two	7	1	0	0	0	0	0	0	7	1
Accrington Stanley	2009–10	League Two	41	13	5	3	1	1	4	2	51	19
Accrington Stanley	Total		48	14	5	3	1	1	4	2	58	20
AFC Bournemouth	2010–11	League One	22	8	0	0	1	0	1 (Note: Appearances in League One play-offs)	0	24	8
AFC Bournemouth	2011–12	League One	15	3	2	0	0	0	2	0	19	3
AFC Bournemouth	Total		37	11	2	0	1	0	3	0	43	11
Rochdale (loan)	2012–13	League One	15	4	0	0	0	0	0	0	15	4
Leyton Orient	2012–13	League One	13	1	1	0	1	0	3	1	18	2
Burton Albion	2012–13	League Two	15	4	0	0	0	0	1 (Note: Appearances in League Two play-offs)	0	16	4
Burton Albion	2013–14	League Two	13	2	0	0	2	1	1	0	16	3
Burton Albion	Total		28	6	0	0	2	1	2	0	32	7
Southport	2014–15	Conference Premier	2	0	0	0	—		0	0	2	0
Career total			244	55	13	3	9	2	23	7	289	67

== Honours ==
Individual

- Accrington Stanley Player of the Season: 2009–10
