= Steven Watt (footballer) =

Scottish footballer and manager

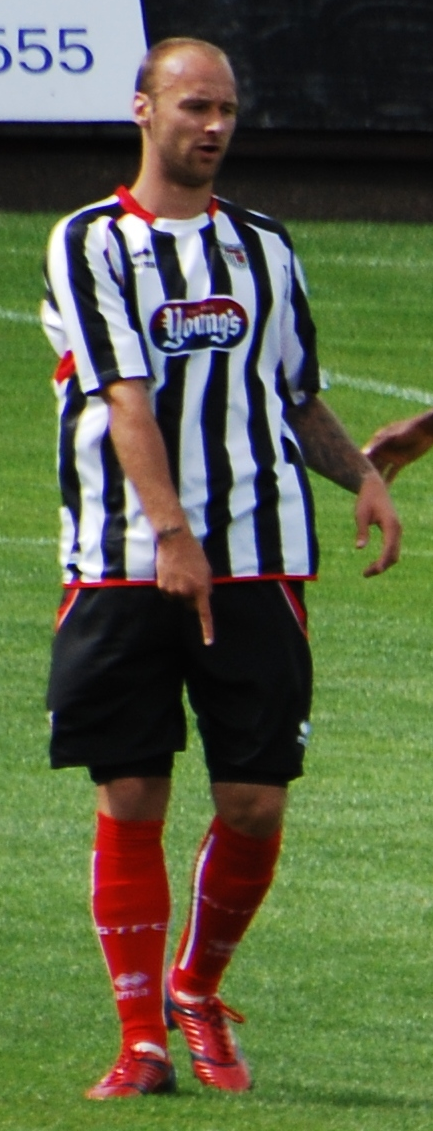
- Watt playing for Grimsby Town in 2010

Personal information
- Full name: Steven Mair Watt
- Date of birth: 1 May 1985 (age 41)
- Place of birth: Aberdeen, Scotland
- Height: 6 ft 3 in (1.91 m)
- Position: Defender

Youth career
- 1998–2002: Aberdeen
- 2002–2005: Chelsea

Senior career*
Years	Team	Apps	(Gls)
2005–2006	Chelsea	1	(0)
2005	→ Barnsley (loan)	3	(1)
2006–2008	Swansea City	3	(0)
2007–2008	→ Inverness Caledonian Thistle (loan)	0	(0)
2008–2010	Ross County	43	(1)
2010–2011	Grimsby Town	25	(2)
2011–2013	Dover Athletic	15	(1)
2013	→ Maidstone United (loan)	6	(1)
2013–2015	Maidstone United	89	(1)
2015	Hemel Hempstead	3	(0)
2015–2016	Leatherhead	19	(0)
2016–2017	Hastings United	13	(5)
Total		220	(12)

International career
2005	Scotland U21	5	(0)

Managerial career
- 2017–2018: Margate
- 2018: Maidstone United (Caretaker)
- 2019–2021: Hythe Town
- 2022–2024: Hythe Town
- * Club domestic league appearances and goals

Steven Mair Watt (born 1 May 1985) is a Scottish football manager and former player.

As a player, he was a centre back who notably played Premier League football for Chelsea, and has also played professionally for Barnsley, Swansea City, Inverness Caledonian Thistle, Ross County and Grimsby Town. He went on to play non-league football for Dover Athletic, Maidstone United, Hemel Hempstead, Leatherhead and Hastings United. Watt was capped five times by Scotland U21 in 2005.

Retiring in 2017, he moved into coaching and has managed Margate, Maidstone United and has had several spells as manager of Hythe Town.

== Career ==
=== Chelsea ===
Born in Aberdeen, and raised in Gardenstown, a fishing village in the North East Aberdeenshire coast, Watt began his career with Chelsea, making his debut against Scunthorpe United in the FA Cup in January 2005. He played the full 90 minutes and earned praise from José Mourinho for his performance. On 15 May 2005 Watt made his Premier League debut coming on as an 89th-minute substitute for Jiri Jarosik in the away fixture with Newcastle United. The game ended 1–1, with Watt playing alongside the likes of Frank Lampard, Ricardo Carvalho, Claude Makélélé, Joe Cole and Eiður Guðjohnsen.

In November 2005 Watt spent a month on loan to Barnsley, for whom he made three starts, scoring an injury time equaliser against Rotherham United.

=== Swansea City ===
Shortly after returning to Chelsea he was allowed to leave the Premier League club and joined Swansea on 10 January 2006. Watt joined Inverness Caledonian Thistle on a season long loan to regain his match fitness. He made his debut in the Scottish League Cup against Arbroath. Despite a fairly solid performance, he never played again for the first team and left the club to return to Swansea City. Watt suffered persistent shoulder injuries during his time with Swansea, which meant that his contract was not extended when it expired at the end of the 2007–08 season.

=== Ross County ===
Following a successful trial, he signed a two-year deal with Ross County in August 2008. Watt made his debut for Ross County on 16 November 2008 in the Challenge Cup Final against Airdrie United. He scored his first goal for the club against Dunfermline on 13 February 2010.

=== Grimsby Town ===
On 17 July 2010 Watt played for Grimsby Town in the club's 2–1 friendly victory over Sheffield Wednesday, and went on to make several impressive appearances for Town in their pre-season campaign. On 2 August 2010, Watt signed a two-year deal with Grimsby. He scored his first goal for the club in a 1–0 win over Darlington on 24 August 2010, and went on to partner Darran Kempson as the club's preferred centre backs during the first part of the season under Neil Woods. However Woods was eventually sacked midway through the season and was replaced by Rob Scott and Paul Hurst who dropped Watt from the first team as he went on to only feature in the pair's first match in charge. Following the conclusion of the 2010–2011 season, he was released.

=== Dover Athletic ===
During pre-season Watt had moved south with his family and had joined Dover Athletic on trial, before formally rejecting a contract from Conference National side Gateshead in the interest of not wanting to uproot his family to the north again. On 18 July Watt joined Mansfield Town on trial. He signed for the club on 2 August 2011.

=== Maidstone United ===
On 15 February 2013 Watt signed an initial month's loan for Maidstone United, the player dropping down two levels to play for his adopted hometown, making six appearances before signing permanently on 18 March 2013. Watt captained Maidstone to the Isthmian league title in the 2014–15 season. On 16 November 2015, Watt was released by the club.

=== Hemel Hempstead Town ===
Several weeks after being released Watt joined Hemel Hempstead Town making his debut on 1 December 2015 in the second round of the Herts Senior Cup, in a 0–3 defeat to Bishop's Stortford. His league debut was four days later against Ebbsfleet United, ending in a 1–2 home defeat. Watt's third and final game for the club came a week later when he captained Hemel in a 7-4 FA Trophy defeat at Eastbourne Borough.

=== Leatherhead ===
On 14 December 2015 Watt joined Leatherhead as player/assistant manager

== Coaching career ==
Watt was appointed manager of Hythe Town for a second time, on 17 May 2022. Although he resigned following a play-off final defeat, he later rescinded his relegation and returned to the club the following day.

In April 2024, the club confirmed that Watt would be stepping down from his position as manager at the end of the season. Following a defeat in their next fixture however, he left the club with immediate effect.

Following his departure from Hythe Town, Watt began coaching with Kent Phoenix American football team as a defensive coach.

In April 2026, he joined the coaching staff of Isthmian League South East Division club Faversham Town, assisting caretaker manager Francis Collin until the end of the season.
