= Chris Turner (footballer, born 1990) =

English footballer

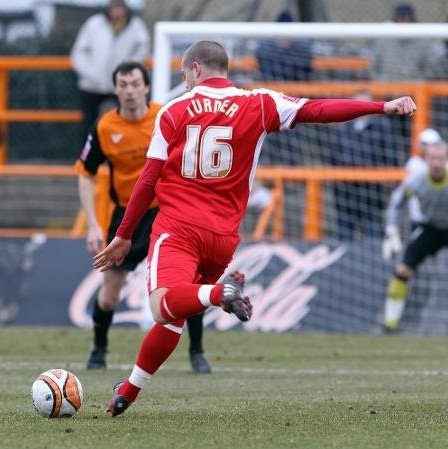
- Turner playing for Accrington Stanley in 2010

Personal information
- Full name: Christopher Jack Michael Turner
- Date of birth: 26 August 1990 (age 36)
- Place of birth: Burnley, England
- Height: 5 ft 10 in (1.78 m)
- Position: Midfielder

Team information
- Current team: Barnoldswick Town

Youth career
- 1999–2006: Burnley
- 2006–2008: Accrington Stanley

Senior career*
Years	Team	Apps	(Gls)
2008–2011	Accrington Stanley	69	(3)
2011	Clitheroe	1	(0)
2011	Worksop Town	0	(0)
2011–2012	Burscough		
2012	Barrow	5	(0)
2012	Stocksbridge Park Steels		
2012–2013	Nelson	52	(19)
2013–2019	Padiham	150	(44)
2019-	Barnoldswick Town	9	(1)
- * Club domestic league appearances and goals as of 09:20, 16 May 2014 (UTC)

Christopher Jack Michael Turner (born 26 August 1990) is an English semi-professional footballer who played in the Football League, as a midfielder for Accrington Stanley. He plays for North West Counties League Premier Division club Barnoldswick Town.

== Career ==
Turner was born in Burnley and educated at St Theodore's RC High School in the town. He started his footballing career as a seven-year-old with local junior side Brierfield Celtic, and later St Joseph's in Accrington. In 2009, Turner joined the youth system at Burnley. Turner spent seven years in the Centre of Excellence, until, he was released at under-16 level for being too small. He was then invited for a trial at Accrington Stanley, where he successfully started a two-year scholarship scheme with the club in 2006. Turner made his professional debut whilst still a scholar in February 2008, coming on as a substitute for Jay Harris in the 2–0 home defeat to Wycombe Wanderers in Football League Two. On completion of his scholarship in April 2010, Turner signed his first professional contract with the club on a one-year deal. Turner scored his first professional goal for the club in October 2009, in the 4–0 win over Cheltenham Town. After making 22 appearances in his debut season as a professional, Turner signed a new two-year contract in June 2009. Turner went on to score a crucial equaliser in a 2–1 win over Doncaster Rovers in the Football League Cup, taking Stanley through to the next round to play Premier League side Newcastle United. Turner struggled to cement a first team place in the side and in May 2011 his contract expired, and he was released after Stanley's Football League Two play-offs exit.

In September 2011, Turner dropped into the non-league with Northern Premier League First Division North side Clitheroe, making his debut in a 4–0 FA Cup win over Skelmersdale United. Turner went on to make a total of three appearances for the club in all competitions. In November 2011, Turner was on the move again, joining NPL Premier Division side Worksop Town. However, he left the club without playing a match due to travel impracticalities. Shortly after leaving Worksop, Turner moved to division rivals Burscough on a free transfer. Turner's stay at Burscough was again short lived and he left the club in January 2012 with the club retaining his non-contract registration. In February 2012, he signed for Conference Premier side Barrow, after impressing during pre-season friendlies. He went straight into the starting line-up for the 3–0 win over Kettering Town. Turner made five league appearances for the club, but was released in March 2012. He finished the campaign with NPL Premier Division side Stocksbridge Park Steels signing for the club in March. In November 2012, Turner signed for North West Counties Football League Division One side Nelson, going on to make 24 appearances in his debut season, scoring five times. In March 2013, Nelson turned down approaches from Conference North side Droylsden and NWCFL Premier Division side Padiham for Turner's services. In May 2013, Turner penned a new one-year contract with the Admirals and was made club captain. In November 2013, Turner left Nelson having scored five goals in a total of 43 appearances scoring six times, moving on to newly promoted NPL Division One North side Padiham. Turner left Padiham in the summer of 2019 to join fellow North West Counties Premier League side Barnoldswick Town

== Career statistics ==
Appearances and goals by club, season and competition
Club	Season	League			FA Cup		League Cup		Other		Total	
Club	Season	Division	Apps	Goals	Apps	Goals	Apps	Goals	Apps	Goals	Apps	Goals
Accrington Stanley	2007–08	League Two	1	0	0	0	0	0	0	0	1	0
Accrington Stanley	2008–09	League Two	22	0	0	0	0	0	0	0	22	0
Accrington Stanley	2009–10	League Two	24	2	0	0	1	0	1 (Note: Appearances in Football League Trophy)	0	26	2
Accrington Stanley	2010–11	League Two	13	0	1	0	2	1	2 (Note: 1 appearance in Football League Trophy, 1 appearance in Football League Two play-offs)	0	18	1
Accrington Stanley	Total		60	2	1	0	3	1	3	0	67	3
Clitheroe	2011–12	NPL Division One North	1	0	2	0	—		0	0	3	0
Worksop Town	2011–12	NPL Premier Division	0	0	0	0	—		0	0	0	0
Barrow	2011–12	Conference Premier	5	0	0	0	—		0	0	5	0
Nelson	2012–13	NWCFL First Division	23	5	—		—		3 (Note: 2 appearances in FA Vase, 1 appearance in NWCFL Challenge Cup)	0	26	5
Nelson	2013–14	NWCFL First Division	13	1	—		—		4 (Note: 2 appearances in FA Vase, 1 appearance in Lancashire FA Challenge Trophy, 1 appearance in NWCFL Challenge Cup)	0	17	1
Nelson	Total		36	6	—		—		7	0	43	6
Career total			102	8	3	0	3	1	10	0	118	9
