= Jamie Sheldon =

English footballer (born 1991)

Personal information
- Full name: Jamie Lee Sheldon
- Date of birth: 14 August 1991 (age 35)
- Place of birth: Birmingham, England
- Positions: Forward; midfielder

Youth career
- 200?–2009: Birmingham City

Senior career*
Years	Team	Apps	(Gls)
2009–2010	Redditch United		
2010	Interblock	10	(0)
2010	Solihull Moors	5	
2010	→ Evesham United (loan)		
2010–2012	Leamington	26	(2)
2012	→ Sutton Coldfield Town (loan)		
2012–2013	Sutton Coldfield Town		
2013	Leamington	0	(0)
2013–2014	Stratford Town	38	(15)
2014–2015	Sutton Coldfield Town		
2015–2016	Stratford	60	(12)
2016–2017	Hednesford Town	9	(1)
2017	Chasetown	7	(2)

International career
2007	England U17	4	(2)
- * Club domestic league appearances and goals

Jamie Lee Sheldon (born 14 August 1991) is an English former footballer who played professionally in the Slovenian PrvaLiga for NK Interblock. He began his career in Birmingham City's Academy, but was not offered a professional contract, and also played non-league football for Redditch United, Solihull Moors, Evesham United, Leamington, Stratford Town, Hednesford Town, Sutton Coldfield Town and Chasetown. Internationally, he represented England at under-17 level.

== Life and career ==
Sheldon was born in 1991 in Birmingham, and attended The International School in the Tile Cross area of the city. He joined Birmingham City's Academy, and during his final year of school, combined studying for his GCSEs with helping the club's youth team reach the quarter-finals of the FA Youth Cup, in which they lost to Manchester United's under-18s. He began a two-year scholarship in 2007.

Sheldon and two Birmingham team-mates, Dean Lyness and Ashley Sammons, were selected for the England under-17 squad for the Nordic Tournament in Denmark in July and August 2007. He played in all three group matches, and scored from 20 yards (18 m) in the 2–1 win against Finland, but losing to Sweden meant they failed to qualify for the final. Sheldon scored again as England beat Norway 4–1 in the third-place play-off.

During his scholarship, he played both youth and reserve-team football, and was a first-half substitute in the Birmingham City team, a mixture of youth and first-team players, that beat Burton Albion 5–0 in the final of the 2008 Birmingham Senior Cup. The following year, he was a regular in the Birmingham youth team that reached the semi-final of the FA Youth Cup, in which they lost over two legs to Liverpool's youngsters. Only one of his age-group was offered a professional contract; the others, Sheldon included, were released.

Sheldon joined Conference North (sixth-tier) club Redditch United for the 2009–10 season. After six months and six goals, he left in January 2010 to take up the offer of a professional contract with Slovenian PrvaLiga team Interblock of Ljubljana. He played twice for Interblock in the Slovenian Cup, and made ten appearances (seven starts) in the 2009–10 PrvaLiga, at the end of which the team were relegated and Sheldon returned to England.

He had trials with Football League clubs Hereford United, for which he scored to help his side win the Herefordshire Senior Cup, and Rochdale, before signing for Solihull Moors. He made five appearances in the Conference North, played five times on loan to Evesham United, and then joined a fellow Southern League Premier Division team, Leamington, in November 2010. He was a regular in the team for the rest of the season, but a broken metatarsal meant he played little in 2011–12. While regaining fitness, he spent time with Sutton Coldfield Town of the Northern Premier League Division One South, joined them again for the 2012–13 season, and made a brief return to Leamington to play in one FA Cup tie.

Sheldon signed for Stratford Town in October 2013. After missing only one match between then and the following September, he completed the 2014–15 season with Sutton Coldfield Town, helping them gain promotion to the NPL Premier Division. He rejoined Stratford Town, made 52 appearances in all competitions during the 2015–16 season, and took his total past the 100 mark in August 2016, marking the occasion with a "trademark long-range special", before leaving the club in November for off-field reasons. Sheldon spent a couple of months with Hednesford Town, scoring once from nine Northern Premier League matches, and in February 2017, signed for Chasetown.

Sheldon played seven matches in the NPL Division One South and scored twice, before suffering an ACL injury in March 2017. He underwent reconstructive surgery some months later. Soon afterwards, he was diagnosed with testicular cancer. He received surgery and chemotherapy at the Queen Elizabeth Hospital, Birmingham, and in March 2018 was reported to be in remission.
