= Bradley Hudson-Odoi =

Ghanaian footballer

Personal information
- Full name: Bradley Hudson-Odoi
- Date of birth: 29 November 1988 (age 37)
- Place of birth: Accra, Ghana
- Height: 5 ft 8 in (1.73 m)
- Position: Striker

Youth career
- 2001–2008: Fulham

Senior career*
Years	Team	Apps	(Gls)
2008–2009	Hereford United	16	(3)
2009	→ Grays Athletic (loan)	11	(0)
2009–2010	Histon	19	(3)
2009	→ Grays Athletic (loan)	2	(0)
2010–2011	Thurrock	2	(0)
2011–2012	Vasas	6	(0)
2013–2015	Metropolitan Police	65	(19)
2015–2016	Wealdstone	37	(11)
2016–2018	Sutton United	13	(2)
2016	→ Maidstone United (loan)	4	(0)
2017	→ Hampton & Richmond Borough (loan)	14	(6)
2017–2018	→ Eastleigh (loan)	6	(0)
2018	Hampton & Richmond Borough	11	(2)
2018–2019	Wealdstone	17	(3)
2019	Woking	2	(0)
2021	Saha	5	(5)

International career
2007	Ghana U20		
- * Club domestic league appearances and goals as of 20:05, 17 February 2019 (UTC)

Bradley Hudson-Odoi (born 29 November 1988) is a Ghanaian footballer who last played as a striker for National League South side, Woking.

== Background ==
Born in Accra, Hudson-Odoi is the son of former Hearts of Oak midfielder Bismark Odoi and older brother of Nottingham Forest forward Callum Hudson-Odoi

== Club career ==
He joined Fulham at the age of 12 but never played for the first team. He signed for Hereford United on 16 July 2008. He made his debut for Hereford in a 2–1 defeat against Leyton Orient.

In March 2009, Hudson-Odoi signed for Grays Athletic on an initial one-month loan with a view to a permanent deal after spending two weeks on trial with the Conference National club. He made his debut on 7 March 2009 in the 2–1 home win over Altrincham, supplying Jamie Slabber with a cross to score Grays' second goal. He joined Histon on a contract until January 2010 in August 2009. He rejoined Grays on a month's loan on 27 November. He rejoined Grays Athletic for a third time on 26 October 2010, before joining Conference South club Thurrock in December.

After a stint abroad at Hungarian side Vasas, Bradley joined Metropolitan Police on trial, before signing a contract in January 2014. Playing for Wealdstone in the 2015–16 season, Bradley was voted their player of the season. After the season ended, Wealdstone announced Bradley's departure for a team in the National League, later announced as Sutton United.

Hudson-Odoi made his first league appearance for Sutton as a substitute on their opening day defeat of the 2016–17 season to Solihull Moors on 6 August 2016, coming on for Roarie Deacon, before making his first full appearance and debut in a 2–0 win over Torquay United on 16 August. On his third appearance for Sutton, he scored his first league goal for the club and the winner in a 1–0 home victory over Dagenham & Redbridge on 29 August 2016 when he connected with Ross Stearn's cross and struck a half volley 11 minutes into the game.

On 10 November 2016 Hudson-Odoi joined Maidstone United on loan for one month.

Hudson-Odoi appeared in Sutton's historic run to the fifth round of the FA Cup for the first time ever, including a 3–1 victory over League One side and local rivals AFC Wimbledon in the third round on 17 January 2017, and a 2–0 defeat to Premier League team Arsenal in the fifth round on 20 February.

On 20 November 2017, Hudson-Odoi joined Eastleigh on a two-month loan from Sutton United. On 23 February 2018, he was released by Sutton and signed for Hampton & Richmond Borough.

On 22 May 2018, Hudson-Odoi returned to Wealdstone. On 25 January 2019, Hudson-Odoi left Wealdstone after an injury hit season and soon reunited with former manager, Alan Dowson at fellow National League South side, Woking. However, just after featuring twice for the Surrey-based side, Hudson-Odoi opted to leave the club in February 2019.

== International career ==
He was part of the Ghana U20 squad for the 2007 Toulon Tournament.

== Personal life ==
In October 2023, Hudson-Odoi was fined £220 for a missing registration plate on the front of his Lamborghini car.

== Career statistics ==
As of match played 17 February 2019.

Appearances and goals by club, season and competition
Club	Season	League			National Cup		League Cup		Other		Total	
Club	Season	Division	Apps	Goals	Apps	Goals	Apps	Goals	Apps	Goals	Apps	Goals
Hereford United	2008–09	League One	16	3	2	0	1	0	1 (Note: Appearance(s) in Football League Trophy)	0	20	3
Grays Athletic (loan)	2008–09	Conference Premier	11	0	—		—		0	0	11	0
Histon	2009–10	Conference Premier	19	3	0	0	—		0	0	19	3
Grays Athletic (loan)	2009–10	Conference Premier	2	0	0	0	—		0	0	2	0
Thurrock	2010–11	Conference South	2	0	0	0	—		0	0	2	0
Vasas	2011–12	Nemzeti Bajnokság I	6	0	1	2	—		—		7	2
Metropolitan Police	2013–14	Isthmian League Premier Division	23	8	0	0	—		1 (Note: Appearance(s) in Alan Turvey Trophy)	0	24	8
Metropolitan Police	2014–15	Isthmian League Premier Division	42	11	0	0	—		0	0	42	11
Metropolitan Police	Total		65	19	0	0	—		1	0	66	19
Wealdstone	2015–16	National League South	37	11	5	2	—		2 (Note: Appearance(s) in FA Trophy)	3	44	16
Sutton United	2016–17	National League	11	2	4	0	—		2 (Note: Appearance(s) in FA Trophy)	0	17	2
Sutton United	2017–18	National League	2	0	0	0	—		0	0	2	0
Sutton United	Total		13	2	4	0	—		2	0	19	2
Maidstone United (loan)	2016–17	National League	4	0	—		—		—		4	0
Hampton & Richmond Borough (loan)	2017–18	National League South	14	6	0	0	—		0	0	14	6
Eastleigh (loan)	2017–18	National League	6	0	0	0	—		1	0	7	0
Hampton & Richmond Borough	2017–18	National League South	11	2	0	0	—		4 (Note: Appearance(s) in National League South play-offs)	2	15	4
Wealdstone	2018–19	National League South	17	3	1	0	—		2	0	20	3
Woking	2018–19	National League South	2	0	—		—		0	0	2	0
Career total			225	49	18	4	1	0	13	5	257	58
