= Gavin McCallum =

Canadian professional soccer player (born 1987)

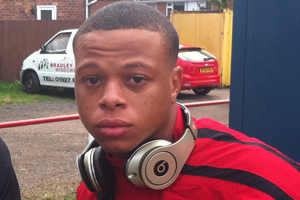
- McCallum in 2011

Personal information
- Full name: Gavin Kirk McCallum
- Date of birth: August 24, 1987 (age 39)
- Place of birth: Mississauga, Ontario, Canada
- Height: 1.75 m (5 ft 9 in)
- Position: Left-back

Youth career
- 2005–2006: Yeovil Town

Senior career*
Years	Team	Apps	(Gls)
2006–2007	Yeovil Town	1	(0)
2006	→ Tamworth (loan)	13	(0)
2006–2007	→ Crawley Town (loan)	2	(0)
2007	→ Dorchester Town (loan)	15	(5)
2007–2008	Weymouth	24	(6)
2008	Havant & Waterlooville	12	(2)
2008–2009	Sutton United	41	(14)
2009–2010	Hereford United	27	(8)
2010–2012	Lincoln City	54	(6)
2011–2012	→ Barnet (loan)	2	(0)
2012–2013	Woking	49	(5)
2013–2014	Sutton United	22	(5)
2013–2014	→ Tonbridge Angels (loan)	4	(1)
2014–2018	Eastbourne Borough	142	(26)
2018–2020	Welling United	52	(6)
2020–2021	Dartford	5	(0)
2021	Bognor Regis Town	7	(0)

International career^{‡}
2006	Canada U20	4	(0)
2010	Canada	1	(1)
2021	Cascadia	1	(0)
- * Club domestic league appearances and goals as of 17:00, 4 June 2021 (UTC) ‡ National team caps and goals as of 13:08, 26 October 2021 (UTC)

Gavin Kirk McCallum (born August 24, 1987) is a Canadian professional soccer player who plays as a left-back.

== Club career ==
Born in Mississauga, Ontario, McCallum began his career in 2005 with Yeovil Town. He agreed an 18-month contract with the club on 31 January 2006. On August 22, 2006, he joined Tamworth on a month's loan, joining the club for a second month on October 5, 2006. On November 23, 2006, he joined Crawley Town on loan. On March 2, 2007, he joined Dorchester Town on a month's loan. The following day he made his debut for the club in the 5–1 Conference South home defeat to Lewes before netting his first goals for the club when scoring twice in the 3–2 victory at Thurrock a week later. He remained with the club until the end of the season, scoring a total of five goals in 15 Conference South appearances.

He later played for Weymouth and Havant & Waterlooville.

He joined Sutton United ahead of the 2008–09 season, scoring just twelve minutes into his debut in the 1–1 Isthmian League draw at Harlow Town on August 16, 2008. He went on to play a total of 54 times for the club, scoring 19 goals (41 league appearances seeing him yield 14 goals). McCallum signed for League Two side Hereford United on a short-term deal on August 21, 2009, having impressed while on trial with the club.

In the summer of 2010, McCallum joined Lincoln City on a two-year deal. As he was under 24 a fee had to be agreed between The Imps and Hereford, and this fee was agreed on July 26, 2010. He made his debut for Lincoln City in a 2–0 loss to Torquay United August 14, 2010. McCallum scored his first goal for Lincoln on January 15, 2011, in a 2–1 home loss to Wycombe Wanderers. About three weeks later Gavin scored his second league goal of the season as well as the winning goal in a tight match versus Bradford City on February 1, 2011. The game ended in a 2–1 away win at the Valley Parade, with McCallum paying tribute to his father after scoring the winning goal in the 79th minute. He then went on to score in a 2–1 away loss to Port Vale.

In May 2011, he was made available for transfer by the club after a mass clear out of players following relegation from the Football League.

On November 22, 2011, McCallum signed on loan for League Two club Barnet until 8 January 2012. On January 30, 2012 he left Lincoln City by mutual consent.

He joined Woking ahead of the 2012–13 season. He was released at the end of the 2012–13 season after failing to hold down a regular starting spot in the first team.

McCallum returned to Woking for pre-season training, with manager Garry Hill commenting "We told him ‘you’re not fit enough, you have talent but for that to come out you will have to go away, come back pre-season and show what you can do.’" Having impressed Hill, he agreed a further one year contract with The Cards However, in October, he was transfer listed along with Lee Sawyer with manager Garry Hill stating that the duo did not feature in his future plans after being disappointed with their attitude. On Monday 9 December 2013, Woking announced that he'd been released from his contract in order to join former club Sutton United, McCallum having made his second debut for The Us the previous Saturday in the 3-2 Football Conference South home victory over Maidenhead United. In need of regular matches to improve his fitness, McCallum joined Tonbridge Angels on an initial one-month loan debuting in the club's 3-1 Football Conference South defeat at Dover Athletic on 26 December 2013. Although the club were keen to extend the loan, he was recalled to Sutton United. In June 2014 he joined Eastbourne Borough.

It was announced on June 23, 2018, that he had signed for Welling United.

On October 2, 2020, McCullum joined Dartford.

On June 3, 2021, McCullem joined Bognor Regis Town.

== International career ==
After representing the Canada U-20 men's national soccer team, Gavin McCallum earned his first cap with the Canada senior team in a friendly against Venezuela on May 29, 2010, with the distinction of scoring on his debut in the 92nd minute to earn Canada a 1-1 draw.

On February 27, 2019, it was announced that McCallum had been selected to the Cascadia official soccer team for their match against the Chagos Islands.

=== International goals ===
Scores and results list Canada's goal tally first.

#	Date	Venue	Opponent	Score	Result	Competition
1	May 29, 2010	Estadio Metropolitano de Mérida, Mérida, Venezuela	Venezuela	1 –1	1 – 1	Friendly match

== Career statistics ==
As of match played 5 December 2020

Appearances and goals by club, season and competition
Club	Season	League			FA Cup		League Cup		Other		Total	
Club	Season	Division	Apps	Goals	Apps	Goals	Apps	Goals	Apps	Goals	Apps	Goals
Yeovil Town	2006–07	League One	1	0	0	0	0	0	0	0	1	0
Tamworth (loan)	2006–07	Conference Premier	13	0	0	0	—		0	0	13	0
Crawley Town (loan)	2006–07	Conference Premier	2	0	0	0	—		0	0	2	0
Dorchester Town (loan)	2006–07	Conference South	15	5	0	0	—		0	0	15	5
Weymouth	2007–08	Conference Premier	24	6	2	0	—		1 (Note: Appearance(s) in FA Trophy)	0	27	6
Havant & Waterlooville	2007–08	Conference South	12	2	0	0	—		0	0	12	2
Sutton United	2008–09	Isthmian Premier Division	41	14	1	0	—		0	0	42	14
Hereford United	2009–10	League Two	27	8	2	0	0	0	2 (Note: Appearance(s) in Football League Trophy)	0	31	8
Lincoln City	2010–11	League Two	36	3	0	0	1	0	0	0	37	3
Lincoln City	2011–12	Conference Premier	18	3	1	0	—		0	0	19	3
Lincoln City	Total		54	6	1	0	1	0	0	0	56	6
Barnet (loan)	2011–12	League Two	2	0	0	0	0	0	0	0	2	0
Woking	2012–13	Conference Premier	43	5	1	0	—		1	1	45	6
Woking	2013–14	Conference Premier	6	0	0	0	—		0	0	6	0
Woking	Total		49	5	1	0	—		1	1	51	6
Sutton United	2013–14	Conference South	22	5	0	0	—		2 (Note: Appearance(s) in 2013–14 Conference South play-offs)	0	24	5
Tonbridge Angels (loan)	2013–14	Conference South	4	1	0	0	—		0	0	4	1
Eastbourne Borough	2014–15	Conference South	40	9	5	0	—		4 (Note: One appearance in FA Trophy, three appearances and one goal in Sussex Senior Challenge Cup)	1	49	10
Eastbourne Borough	2015–16	National League South	39	4	3	1	—		9 (Note: Four appearances and two goals in FA Trophy, five appearances and one goal in Sussex Senior Challenge Cup)	3	51	8
Eastbourne Borough	2016–17	National League South	28	5	5	1	—		2 (Note: One appearance in Sussex Senior Challenge Cup, one appearance and one goal in Sussex Community Shield)	1	35	7
Eastbourne Borough	2017–18	National League South	35	8	2	0	—		5 (Note: Three appearances and one goal in FA Trophy, two appearances and one goal in Sussex Senior Challenge Cup)	2	42	10
Eastbourne Borough	Total		142	26	15	2	—		20	7	177	35
Welling United	2018–19	National League South	34	4	0	0	—		0	0	34	4
Welling United	2019–20	National League South	18	2	0	0	—		0	0	18	2
Welling United	Total		52	6	0	0	—		0	0	52	6
Dartford	2020–21	National League South	5	0	1	0	—		0	0	6	0
Bognor Regis Town	2021–22	Isthmian League Premier Division	0	0	0	0	—		0	0	0	0
Career total			465	84	23	2	1	0	26	8	516	94

== Personal life ==
Gavin is the nephew of Canadian former international Trevor McCallum.
