= Marc Manga =

French footballer (born 1988)

Personal information
- Full name: Marc Andre Manga Epresse Priso
- Date of birth: 16 January 1988 (age 38)
- Height: 1.75 m (5 ft 9 in)
- Position: Striker

Senior career*
Years	Team	Apps	(Gls)
2009	Rochdale	2	(0)
- * Club domestic league appearances and goals

Marc Andre Manga Epresse Priso (born 16 January 1988) is a French professional footballer who plays as a striker.

== Career ==
After trialling with Hereford United in the previous summer, Manga signed on non-contract terms with Rochdale in October 2009. Manga made three appearances for Rochdale, two in the Football League and one in the FA Cup, before being released in November 2009.

== Career statistics ==
Club	Season	Division	League		FA Cup		League Cup		Other		Total	
Club	Season	Division	Apps	Goals	Apps	Goals	Apps	Goals	Apps	Goals	Apps	Goals
Rochdale	2009–10	League Two	2	0	1	0	0	0	0	0	3	0
Career total			2	0	1	0	0	0	0	0	3	0
