= Millfield School, Lancashire =

Millfield School

Location
- Thornton-Cleveleys, Lancashire, FY5 5DG; United Kingdom; 53.8651°N 3.0007°W

Information
- Type: Community school
- Local authority: Lancashire
- Department for Education URN: 119714 Tables
- Ofsted: Reports
- Head teacher: Nicola Regan
- Age: 11 to 16
- Website: http://www.millfield.lancs.sch.uk/

Millfield School is a community school in Lancashire in northwestern England.

== History ==
The school gained specialist college status in 2005 and was renamed as Millfield Science and Performing Arts College.

In September 2026, the school changed its name from Millfield Science and Performing Arts College to Millfield School, with a new logo featuring Marsh Mill.
