= Simon Johnson (footballer) =

English footballer (born 1983)

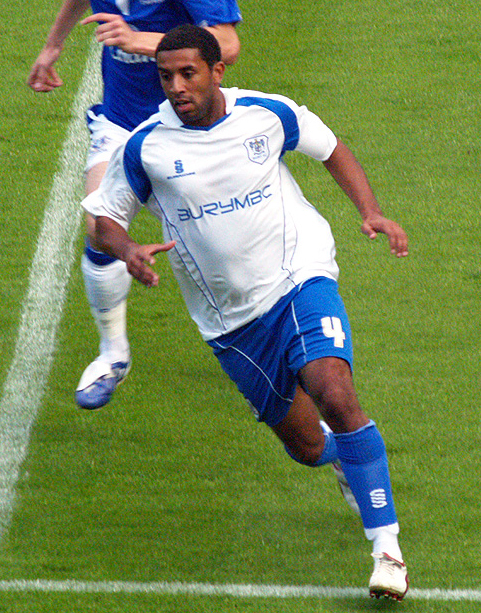
- Johnson during the 2009–10 season

Personal information
- Full name: Simon Ainsley Johnson
- Date of birth: 9 March 1983 (age 43)
- Place of birth: West Bromwich, England
- Height: 5 ft 9 in (1.75 m)
- Position: Attacking midfielder

Team information
- Current team: Redditch United (first-team coach)

Youth career
- Leeds United

Senior career*
Years	Team	Apps	(Gls)
2000–2005	Leeds United	11	(0)
2002	→ Hull City (loan)	12	(2)
2003–2004	→ Blackpool (loan)	4	(1)
2004	→ Sunderland (loan)	5	(0)
2004–2005	→ Doncaster Rovers (loan)	11	(3)
2005	→ Barnsley (loan)	11	(2)
2005–2007	Darlington	66	(9)
2007–2009	Hereford United	62	(5)
2009	Bury	4	(0)
2009–2010	Halesowen Town	13	(4)
2010	Solihull Moors	7	(4)
2010	Guiseley	11	(4)
2010	→ Solihull Moors (loan)	8	(3)
2011–2012	Solihull Moors	37	(5)
2012	Hinckley United	1	(0)
2014–2015	Hinckley	6	(0)
2021–2022	Highgate United	0	(0)
Total		269	(42)

International career
2003	England U20	3	(0)

Managerial career
- 2021–2022: Highgate United
- * Club domestic league appearances and goals

Simon Ainsley Johnson (born 9 March 1983) is an English football coach and former professional player who played as an attacking midfielder. He is currently serving as first-team coach at Southern League Premier Division Central club Redditch United. He played in the Premier League for Leeds United and made 175 Football League appearances spread over eight clubs before moving into non-league football. He represented England at under-20 level.

== Playing career ==
Johnson was born in West Bromwich and attended Stuart Bathurst Catholic High School. He left at 14 to join Leeds United, and continued his education at Boston Spa Academy. He signed his first professional contract at Elland Road in July 2000, but with a number of strikers ahead of him in the pecking order, he did not make his senior debut until he was loaned to Hull City. In his first match for the Tigers, on 13 August 2002 at Bristol Rovers, he was brought on as a substitute and scored an 85th-minute equaliser which secured a 1–1 draw. Late in the 2002–03 season he made his Premier League debut for Leeds in the 6–1 defeat of Charlton Athletic, replacing Alan Smith. A 2003 feature on the Football Association's website likened him to Smith, as a "tenacious and skillful target man [who] knows where the goal is."

Over the next two seasons, Johnson only made sporadic appearances for Leeds and was loaned to Blackpool, Sunderland, Doncaster Rovers and Barnsley for first-team experience. He was released by Leeds at the end of the 2004–05 season – he later stated he had not been informed by the club but had found out via a newspaper headline.

In June 2005, he signed for Darlington on a free transfer where he enjoyed regular first-team football, but fell out of favour under manager Dave Penney after nearly signing for Wycombe Wanderers. He joined Hereford United on 8 August 2007, initially on a short-term contract, which was later extended. In his first season at Edgar Street he was used mainly as a winger and made little impact until he scored a last-minute equaliser against Wycombe in December 2007. He made his first league start of the season in the following match, and featured regularly for the remainder of the season as Hereford won promotion to League One. In that season's FA Cup, he scored an inspirational winner against Tranmere Rovers to send Hereford into the fourth round for the first time in 16 years. The following season, Johnson was used mainly as a substitute, failed to score, and left the club by mutual consent on 21 April 2009.

Johnson joined Bury on a three-month deal in August 2009, and made his debut as late substitute in a 3–0 loss to AFC Bournemouth, but left the club after the first month.

He moved into non-league football with Halesowen Town and Solihull Moors, before joining his fourth club of the 2009–10 campaign, Guiseley, in March 2010. Johnson made 11 appearances as Guiseley won the Northern Premier League Premier Division, and committed his future to the club ahead of their upcoming campaign in the Conference North. After being linked with Hibernians in Malta, Johnson rejoined Solihull Moors on loan in September 2010, before signing permanently in January 2011. He finished his playing career with Hinckley United and Hinckley, before coming out of retirement to make one substitute appearance in the FA Vase for Highgate United during a short spell – July 2021 to January 2022 – as manager of the Midland League club.

== Coaching career ==
On 4 December 2024, Johnson was appointed first-team coach at Southern League Premier Division Central club Redditch United.

== Career statistics ==
Appearances and goals by club, season and competition
Club	Season	League			FA Cup		League Cup		Other		Total	
Club	Season	Division	Apps	Goals	Apps	Goals	Apps	Goals	Apps	Goals	Apps	Goals
Leeds United	2002–03	Premier League	4	0	0	0	—		0	0	4	0
Leeds United	2003–04	Premier League	5	0	—		0	0	—		5	0
Leeds United	2004–05	Championship	2	0	0	0	1	0	—		3	0
Leeds United	Total		11	0	0	0	1	0	0	0	12	0
Hull City (loan)	2002–03	Division Three	12	2	—		1	0	—		13	2
Blackpool (loan)	2003–04	Division Two	4	1	1	0	—		—		5	1
Sunderland (loan)	2004–05	Championship	5	0	—		0	0	—		5	0
Doncaster Rovers (loan)	2004–05	League One	11	3	—		—		—		11	3
Barnsley (loan)	2004–05	League One	11	2	—		—		—		11	2
Darlington	2005–06	League Two	42	7	1	0	1	0	1 (Note: Appearance(s) in Football League Trophy)	0	45	7
Darlington	2006–07	League Two	24	2	2	0	2	1	3	0	31	3
Darlington	Total		66	9	3	0	3	1	4	0	76	10
Hereford United	2007–08	League Two	33	5	4	1	1	0	1	0	39	6
Hereford United	2008–09	League One	29	0	2	0	1	0	1	0	33	0
Hereford United	Total		62	5	6	1	2	0	2	0	72	6
Bury	2009–10	League Two	4	0	—		1	0	1	0	6	0
Halesowen Town	2009–10 (Note: The Aylesbury United source shows 23 appearances, but some of the earlier ones share dates with matches that Johnson was playing for Bury in League Two. The 7 October 2009 match against Rugby Town was Simon Johnson's Halesowen debut, and counting the appearances from that date gives 15 appearances and four goals, matching the Yeltz Archive source. The earlier appearances belong to James Johnson.)	Southern League Premier Division	13	4	—		—		2 (Note: Appearances in Southern League Cup)	0	15	4
Solihull Moors	2009–10	Conference North	7	4	—		—		—		7	4
Guiseley	2009–10	Northern Premier League Premier Division	11	4	—		—		1 (Note: Appearance in Peter Swales Shield)	1	12	5
Solihull Moors	2010–11 (Note: Part of this season was spent on loan from Guiseley. Some of his appearances were incorrectly attributed by Soccerway to Marvin Johnson, who had left Solihull Moors for Romulus before the start of the season.)	Conference North	31	8	3	0	—		(Note: Source needed for possible appearance in FA Trophy 3QR away to Curzon Ashton on 20 November 2010)		34	8
Solihull Moors	2011–12	Conference North	14	0	2 (Note: Source needed for possible appearance in FA Cup 3QR at home to Grantham Town on 15 October 2011)	0	—		2 (Note: Appearances in FA Trophy)	0	18	0
Solihull Moors	Total		45	8	5	0	—		2	0	52	8
Hinckley United	2011–12	Conference North	1	0	0	0	—		0	0	1	0
Hinckley	2014–15	Midland League Division One	3	0	—		—		1 (Note: Appearance(s) in JW Hunt Cup)	0	4	0
Hinckley	2015–16	Midland League Division One	3	0	0	0	—		0	0	3	0
Hinckley	Total		6	0	0	0	—		1	0	7	0
Highgate United	2021–22	Midland League Premier Division	0	0	0	0	—		1 (Note: Appearance in FA Vase)	0	1	0
Career total			269	42	15	1	8	1	14	1	306	45

== Honours ==
Hereford United

- Football League Two third place: 2007–08

Guiseley

- Northern Premier League Premier Division: 2009–10
- Northern Premier League Peter Swales Shield: 2009–10
