= Craig Jones (footballer, born 1989) =

English footballer

Personal information
- Full name: Craig Nicholas Jones
- Date of birth: 19 December 1989 (age 36)
- Place of birth: Hereford, England
- Position: Central midfielder

Team information
- Current team: Westfields

Youth career
- Cardiff City
- Hereford United

Senior career*
Years	Team	Apps	(Gls)
2007–2010	Hereford United	4	(0)
2008	→ Bromsgrove Rovers (loan)	3	(0)
2008–2009	→ Redditch United (loan)	2	(0)
2010–2013	Westfields	?	(?)
2013	Hereford United	2	(0)
2013–	Westfields	?	(?)
- * Club domestic league appearances and goals as of 19:06, 13 October 2014 (UTC)

Craig Nicholas Jones (born 19 December 1989) is an English football midfield player, who plays for Westfields. He started his career at Hereford Lads Club. He was then scouted by Cardiff City, where he remained for several years before joining the Hereford United youth set up. Due to injuries to several other players Jones featured on the bench in two League matches at the beginning of December. He made his debut for Hereford in the 2–0 home defeat against Colchester United when he came on as a substitute for Stephen O'Leary in a game that relegated the club back into Football League Two.

On 27 March 2008 he was loaned to Bromsgrove Rovers for a month. In December 2008 he was loaned to Conference North side Redditch United for a month where he played in two league matches. He joined Westfields in the summer of 2010 after being released by Hereford United. He re-joined Hereford on non-contract terms on 21 March 2013. After not being offered a contract at Edgar Street he returned to Westfields for the start of the 2013–14 season.

Jones retired from football to pursue a career in stock management with ex-Westfields manager Sean Edwards.
