= Craig King =

English professional footballer

Personal information
- Full name: Craig Stuart King
- Date of birth: 16 October 1990 (age 36)
- Place of birth: Chesterfield, England
- Height: 1.80 m (5 ft 11 in)
- Position: Winger

Team information
- Current team: Matlock Town

Youth career
- 2005–2008: Leicester City

Senior career*
Years	Team	Apps	(Gls)
2008–2011	Leicester City	0	(0)
2009	→ Hereford United (loan)	25	(3)
2010	→ Northampton Town (loan)	7	(0)
2011–2012	AFC Telford United	4	(0)
2012–2013	Worksop Town		
2013–2015	Buxton		
2015–2016	Bradford Park Avenue	58	(5)
2016–2017	Salford City	30	(0)
2017–2018	Gainsborough Trinity	40	(4)
2018–2019	Alfreton Town	4	(0)
2019–2021	Matlock Town	12	(0)
2021	Frickley Athletic	0	(0)
2021–	Matlock Town		

International career^{‡}
2009	Scotland U19	2	(0)
- * Club domestic league appearances and goals as of 12:41, 1 August 2020 (UTC) ‡ National team caps and goals as of 19:31, 18 May 2009 (UTC)

Craig Stuart King (born 6 October 1990) is a professional footballer who plays for Northern Premier League side Matlock Town, where he plays as a winger. Born in England, he represented Scotland at youth international level.

== Club career ==
Born in Chesterfield, Derbyshire, King started his career at Leicester City where he came through their youth academy alongside Joe Mattock, Max Gradel, Andy King (unrelated), and Luke O'Neill, he signed a two-year pro-contract on 2 September 2008.

King made a match squad for the 1st time in Leicester's 3–0 Football League Trophy victory over Hartlepool United, however he was an unused substitute on that occasion. However, he did make his debut the following round as a half time substitute replacing Steve Howard against Lincoln City.

On 17 September 2009, King joined Hereford United on a one-month loan, and scored within six minutes of his debut in a 2–0 win over Accrington Stanley. On Monday 19 October, King extended his loan at Hereford until the end of the current season.

On 11 November 2010, King Northampton Town on a one-month loan deal.

On 21 May 2011 he was released from Leicester City and in June joined AFC Telford United.

In February 2015, he joined Bradford Park Avenue for an undisclosed fee.

In May 2016 he joined Salford City.

In May 2017 he joined Gainsborough Trinity.

In September 2020 he appeared for Frickley Athletic in a pre-season friendly against Mickleover. Soon after in June 2021, he joined the West Yorkshire club on a permanent deal. After appearing in a number of pre-season games, he returned to Derbyshire.

== International career ==
On 18 May 2009 King was called up to the Scotland under-19 squad for the UEFA European Championships Elite round, to be held at Bramall Lane, Sheffield.
