= 2008–09 Chesterfield F.C. season =

Chesterfield F.C.
2008–09 season
- Manager: Lee Richardson
- Football League Two: 10th
- FA Cup: Third round
- League Cup: First round
- Football League Trophy: First round

This article documents the 2008–09 season of Derbyshire football club Chesterfield F.C.

== League table ==
Pos	Team	Pld	W	D	L	GF	GA	GD	Pts
8	Dagenham & Redbridge	46	19	11	16	77	53	+24	68
9	Bradford City	46	18	13	15	66	55	+11	67
10	Chesterfield	46	16	15	15	62	57	+5	63
11	Morecambe	46	15	18	13	53	56	−3	63
12	Darlington	46	20	12	14	61	44	+17	62 (Note: Darlington deducted 10 points for entering administration.)

Source: The Football League
Rules for classification: 1) points; 2) goal difference; 3) number of goals scored.

== Results ==
=== League Two ===
9 August 2008 1	Barnet	1–3	Chesterfield	London
	Carew 19'		Lester 57', 62'; Ward 80'	Stadium: Underhill; Attendance: 2,237

16 August 2008 2	Chesterfield	1–3	Bury	Chesterfield
	Kerry 16'		Futcher 4'; Sodje 27'; Morrell 40'	Stadium: Saltergate; Attendance: 3,728

23 August 2008 3	Grimsby Town	0–1	Chesterfield	Grimsby
			Ward 42'	Stadium: Blundell Park; Attendance: 3,306

30 August 2008 4	Chesterfield	0–1	Wycombe Wanderers	Chesterfield
			Williamson 4'	Stadium: Saltergate; Attendance: 3,175

6 September 2008 5	Chesterfield	1–0	Rotherham United	Chesterfield
	Goodall 90'			Stadium: Saltergate; Attendance: 4,951

13 September 2008 6	Dagenham & Redbridge	3–0	Chesterfield	London
	Saunders 2'; Nwojeki 87'; Benson 88'		Ward 42'	Stadium: Victoria Road; Attendance: 1,682

20 September 2008 7	Rochdale	2–1	Chesterfield	Rochdale
	Buckley 67'; Kennedy 90'		Ward 85' (red card) 90'	Stadium: Spotland; Attendance: 2,884

27 September 2008 8	Chesterfield	0–1	Brentford	Chesterfield
	Bean 7'			Stadium: Saltergate; Attendance: 3,188

4 October 2008 9	Morecambe	2–2	Chesterfield	Morecambe
	Drummond 6'; Howe 85'		Robertson 16'; Ward 21' (pen.)	Stadium: Christie Park; Attendance: 1,734

11 October 2008 10	Chesterfield	1–1	Chester City	Chesterfield
	Ward 59'		Linwood 17'	Stadium: Saltergate; Attendance: 3,042

18 October 2008 11	Lincoln City	3–1	Chesterfield	Lincoln
	Oakes 17'; Pătulea 30'; Hone (red card) 47'; Kovács 56'		Lester 73'	Stadium: Sincil Bank; Attendance: 4,326

22 October 2008 12	Chesterfield	5–1	Aldershot Town	Chesterfield
	Lester 24'; Ward 41' (pen.), 53', 76'; Niven 73'		Hudson 50'	Stadium: Saltergate; Attendance: 3,079

25 October 2008 13	Chesterfield	3–1	Notts County	Chesterfield
	Ward 28'; Goodall 57'; Harsley 90'		Facey 60'	Stadium: Saltergate; Attendance: 4,134

28 October 2008 14	Exeter City	1–6	Chesterfield	Exeter
	Stansfield 49'		Winter 38'; Goodall 44'; Lester 63', 76'; Ward 78'; Currie 88'	Stadium: St James Park; Attendance: 5,093

1 November 2008 15	Bournemouth	1–1	Chesterfield	Bournemouth
	Goodall 82' (o.g.)		Kerry 34'	Stadium: Fitness First Stadium; Attendance: 4,082

14 November 2008 16	Chesterfield	2–2	Shrewsbury Town	Chesterfield
	Currie 67'; Ward 72' (pen.)		Holt 45' (pen.), 54'	Stadium: Saltergate; Attendance: 4,099

22 November 2008 17	Chesterfield	1–1	Accrington Stanley	Chesterfield
	Lester 14'		Ryan 85'	Stadium: Saltergate; Attendance: 3,215

25 November 2008 18	Bradford City	3–2	Chesterfield	Bradford
	Lee 29'; Boulding 37'; Conlon 73' (pen.)		Lester 3'; Currie 23'; Goodall (red card) 72'	Stadium: Coral Windows Stadium; Attendance: 12,145

6 December 2008 19	Gillingham	2–1	Chesterfield	Gillingham
	Miller 18'; Jackson 45'		Lester 60'	Stadium: Priestfield; Attendance: 4,622

12 December 2008 20	Chesterfield	2–4	Macclesfield Town	Chesterfield
	Ward 38', 67'; Goodall (red card) 90'		Gritton 23', 57'; Bell 25'; Evans 77'; Green (red card) 90'	Stadium: Saltergate; Attendance: 2,451

20 December 2008 21	Port Vale	0–1	Chesterfield	Stoke on Trent
	Richards (red card) 41'		Downes 54'	Stadium: Vale Park; Attendance: 5,011

26 December 2008 22	Chesterfield	2–2	Luton Town	Chesterfield
	Ward 45'; Boden 82'		Craddock 56'; Roper 90'	Stadium: Saltergate; Attendance: 4,243

28 December 2008 23	Darlington	0–0	Chesterfield	Darlington
				Stadium: The Darlington Arena; Attendance: 3,352

17 January 2009 24	Chester City	1–3	Chesterfield	Chester
	Mozika 53'		Wilson 30' (o.g.); Winter 77'; Kerry 82'	Stadium: Deva Stadium; Attendance: 1,806

24 January 2009 25	Chesterfield	1–2	Morecambe	Chesterfield
	Gritton 57'		Howe 54'; Stanley 65'	Stadium: Saltergate; Attendance: 3,283

28 January 2009 26	Chesterfield	2–1	Exeter City	Chesterfield
	Lester 68', 80'		Moxey 17'	Stadium: Saltergate; Attendance: 2,894

31 January 2009 27	Notts County	0–1	Chesterfield	Nottingham
			Talbot 37'; Hall (red card) 83'	Stadium: Meadow Lane; Attendance: 4,953

14 February 2009 28	Shrewsbury Town	2–1	Chesterfield	Shrewsbury
	Jackson 19'; Davies 53'		Boden 26'	Stadium: Prostar Stadium; Attendance: 4,873

20 February 2009 29	Chesterfield	1–0	Bournemouth	Chesterfield
	Lester 37'			Stadium: Saltergate; Attendance: 3,130

28 February 2009 30	Chesterfield	1–1	Barnet	Chesterfield
	Hall 74'		Yakubu 33'	Stadium: Saltergate; Attendance: 3,068

3 March 2009 31	Bury	1–2	Chesterfield	Bury
	Bishop 60' (pen.)		Downes 2'; Lester 40'; Robertson (red card) 42'	Stadium: Gigg Lane; Attendance: 2,077

7 March 2009 32	Wycombe Wanderers	1–1	Chesterfield	High Wycombe
	Pittman 90'		Lester 31'	Stadium: Adams Park; Attendance: 4,809

11 March 2009 33	Chesterfield	2–1	Grimsby Town	Chesterfield
	Talbot 55'; Niven 75'		Bennett 76'	Stadium: Saltergate; Attendance: 2,999

14 March 2009 34	Chesterfield	1–1	Dagenham & Redbridge	Chesterfield
	Gritton 77'		Saunders 90'	Stadium: Saltergate; Attendance: 3,007

17 March 2009 35	Brentford	0–1	Chesterfield	London
			Gritton 53'	Stadium: Griffin Park; Attendance: 4,541

21 March 2009 36	Rotherham United	3–0	Chesterfield	Sheffield
	Reid 38', 55'; Mills 83'		Talbot (red card) 79'	Stadium: Don Valley Stadium; Attendance: 4,658

25 March 2009 37	Chesterfield	3–0	Rochdale	Chesterfield
	Lester 34', 61'; Robertson 86'			Stadium: Saltergate; Attendance: 3,271

27 March 2009 38	Chesterfield	2–1	Port Vale	Chesterfield
	Lester 68', 74'		Marshall 77'	Stadium: Saltergate; Attendance: 3,511

31 March 2009 39	Aldershot Town	1–1	Chesterfield	Aldershot
	Robinson 52'		Lester 7'	Stadium: EBB Stadium; Attendance: 2,482

4 April 2009 40	Macclesfield Town	1–1	Chesterfield	Macclesfield
	Evans 15'		Gritton 8'	Stadium: Moss Rose; Attendance: 2,276

7 April 2009 41	Chesterfield	1–1	Lincoln City	Chesterfield
	Lester 35'		Pătulea 52'	Stadium: Saltergate; Attendance: 3,419

11 April 2009 42	Chesterfield	0–0	Darlington	Chesterfield
				Stadium: Saltergate; Attendance: 3,642

13 April 2009 43	Luton Town	0–0	Chesterfield	Luton
				Stadium: Kenilworth Road; Attendance: 6,494

18 April 2009 44	Chesterfield	0–1	Gillingham	Chesterfield
			McCammon 22'	Stadium: Saltergate; Attendance: 3,933

25 April 2009 45	Accrington Stanley	1–0	Chesterfield	Accrington
	Grant 50'		Lester (red card) 79'	Stadium: Crown Ground; Attendance: 1,795

2 May 2009 46	Chesterfield	0–2	Bradford City	Chesterfield
			Furman 54'; Boulding 87'	Stadium: Saltergate; Attendance: 3,859

=== FA Cup ===
8 November 2008 Round 1	Chesterfield	3–1	Mansfield Town	Chesterfield
	Winter 32', 58'; Ward 51'		Arnold 78'	Stadium: Saltergate; Attendance: 6,612

9 December 2008 Round 2	Chesterfield	2–2	Droylsden	Chesterfield
	Ward 51'; Lester 79'		Brown 50'; Halford 82'	Stadium: Saltergate; Attendance: 5,698

23 December 2008 Round 2 replay	Droylsden	2–1	Chesterfield	Droylsden
	Newton 31', 55' (pen.)		Lester 35' (red card) 84'	Stadium: Butchers Arms; Attendance: 2,824

3 January 2009 Round 3	Ipswich Town	3–0	Chesterfield	Ipswich
	Walters 50' (pen.); Couñago 53'; Stead 88'			Stadium: Portman Road; Attendance: 12,524

=== League Cup ===
12 August 2008 Round 1	Preston North End	2–0	Chesterfield	Preston
	Mellor 37', 90'			Stadium: Deepdale; Attendance: 5,150

=== Football League Trophy ===
3 September 2008 Northern Section Round 1	Chesterfield	2–2 (1–4 p)	Grimsby Town	Chesterfield
	Lester 18'; Kerry 52'		Jarman 32'; North 78'	Stadium: Deepdale; Attendance: 1,665

== Players ==
=== First-team squad ===
Includes all players who were awarded squad numbers during the season.

Note: Flags indicate national team as defined under FIFA eligibility rules; some limited exceptions apply. Players may hold more than one non-FIFA nationality.

No.	Pos.	Nation	Player
1	GK	(England) ENG	Tommy Lee
3	DF	(Scotland) SCO	Gregor Robertson
4	DF	(England) ENG	Jamie Lowry
5	DF	(Wales) WAL	Rob Page
6	DF	(Trinidad and Tobago) TRI	Kevin Austin
7	MF	(England) ENG	Lewis Montrose (on loan from Wigan Athletic)
8	MF	(Scotland) SCO	Derek Niven
9	FW	(Scotland) SCO	Martin Gritton
10	MF	(England) ENG	Darren Currie
11	MF	(England) ENG	Paul Harsley
12	DF	(England) ENG	Alan Goodall
14	FW	(England) ENG	Jack Lester
15	DF	(Australia) AUS	Aaron Downes
16	FW	(Scotland) SCO	Jamie Winter

No.	Pos.	Nation	Player
17	MF	(England) ENG	Lloyd Kerry
18	DF	(England) ENG	Danny Hall
19	FW	(England) ENG	Scott Boden
20	MF	(England) ENG	Ben Algar
21	MF	(England) ENG	Dan Gray
22	MF	(England) ENG	Peter Till (on loan from Grimsby Town)
23	FW	(England) ENG	Jordan Bowery
24	DF	(England) ENG	Jared Wilson (on loan from Birmingham City)
25	FW	(England) ENG	Drew Talbot (on loan from Luton Town)
26	MF	(England) ENG	Lee Askham
27	MF	(England) ENG	Craig Clay
28	DF	(England) ENG	Alexander Neisig-Moller
29	GK	(England) ENG	Matt Malak
30	DF	(England) ENG	Clayton McDonald (on loan from Manchester City)

=== Left club during season ===
Note: Flags indicate national team as defined under FIFA eligibility rules; some limited exceptions apply. Players may hold more than one non-FIFA nationality.

No.	Pos.	Nation	Player
25	FW	(England) ENG	Luke Boden (returned from loan to Sheffield Wednesday)
22	GK	(England) ENG	Dan Whatsize
26	FW	(Portugal) POR	Val Teixeira (returned from loan to Crystal Palace Baltimore)

No.	Pos.	Nation	Player
24	GK	(Northern Ireland) NIR	Trevor Carson (returned from loan to Sunderland)
7	FW	(Northern Ireland) NIR	Jamie Ward (signed for Sheffield United in January 2009)
2	DF	(England) ENG	Phil Picken (joined Notts County on loan)
