= 2007–08 Chesterfield F.C. season =

Chesterfield F.C.
2007–08 season
- Manager: Lee Richardson
- Football League Two: 8th
- FA Cup: First Round
- League Cup: First Round
- Football League Trophy: First Round

This article documents the 2007–08 season of Derbyshire football club Chesterfield F.C.

== League table ==
Pos	Team	Pld	W	D	L	GF	GA	GD	Pts	Promotion or relegation
6	Darlington	46	22	12	12	67	40	+27	78	Qualification for League Two playoffs
7	Wycombe Wanderers	46	22	12	12	56	42	+14	78	Qualification for League Two playoffs
8	Chesterfield	46	19	12	15	76	56	+20	69	
9	Rotherham United	46	21	11	14	62	58	+4	64 (Note: Rotherham United deducted 10 points for administration entrance.)	
10	Bradford City	46	17	11	18	63	61	+2	62	

Updated to match(es) played on 3 May 2008. Source: The Football League
Rules for classification: 1) points; 2) goal difference; 3) number of goals scored.

== Results ==
=== League Two ===
11 August 2007 1	Chester City	0–0	Chesterfield	Chester
				Stadium: Deva Stadium; Attendance: 3,183

18 August 2007 2	Chesterfield	1–1	Stockport County	Chesterfield
	Lester 79'		Dickinson 64'	Stadium: Saltergate; Attendance: 4,600

25 August 2007 3	Peterborough United	2–3	Chesterfield	Peterborough
	McLean 9'; Lee 45'		Lester 19'; Lowry 60'; Niven 61'	Stadium: London Road; Attendance: 5,005

1 September 2007 4	Chesterfield	2–0	Wycombe Wanderers	Chesterfield
	Niven 44'; Lester 74'			Stadium: Saltergate; Attendance: 3,757

7 September 2007 5	Chesterfield	3–1	Bury	Chesterfield
	Fletcher 33', 77'; Lester 84'		Woodthorpe 75'	Stadium: Saltergate; Attendance: 4,161

15 September 2007 6	Mansfield Town	1–3	Chesterfield	Mansfield
	Dawson 9'; Buxton (red card) 73'		Robertson 3'; Lowry 45'; Lester 90'	Stadium: Field Mill; Attendance: 4,514

22 September 2007 7	Chesterfield	0–1	Barnet	Chesterfield
			Norville 69'	Stadium: Saltergate; Attendance: 4,088

29 September 2007 8	Notts County	1–0	Chesterfield	Nottingham
	Hunt 21'			Stadium: Meadow Lane; Attendance: 5,757

2 October 2007 9	Wrexham	0–4	Chesterfield	Wrexham
			Lester 6', 15'; Rooney 14'; Leven 60'	Stadium: Racecourse Ground; Attendance: 3,058

6 October 2007 10	Chesterfield	2–2	Macclesfield Town	Chesterfield
	Rooney 5', 46'		Gritton 29'; Green 73'	Stadium: Saltergate; Attendance: 4,080

13 October 2007 11	Shrewsbury Town	2–3	Chesterfield	Shrewsbury
	Hibbert 5'; Murdock 68'		Rooney 44'; Lowry 49'; Lester 65' (pen.)	Stadium: New Meadow; Attendance: 5,143

20 October 2007 12	Chesterfield	1–1	Dagenham & Redbridge	Chesterfield
	Downes 8'		Benson 56'	Stadium: Saltergate; Attendance: 4,101

27 October 2007 13	Darlington	0–0	Chesterfield	Darlington
				Stadium: The Darlington Arena; Attendance: 4,205

3 November 2007 14	Chesterfield	2–2	Morecambe	Chesterfield
	Lester 56', 64'		Curtis 1'; Grand 90'	Stadium: Saltergate; Attendance: 3,721

6 November 2007 15	Lincoln City	2–4	Chesterfield	Lincoln
	N'Guessan 44'; Bencherif 67'		Lester 8', 18', 42'; Kovács 65'	Stadium: Sincil Bank; Attendance: 3,893

24 November 2007 16	Milton Keynes Dons	1–2	Chesterfield	Milton Keynes
	Wright 10'		Bastians 33'; Ward 52'	Stadium: Stadium:MK; Attendance: 9,638

5 December 2007 17	Chesterfield	0–2	Rotherham United	Chesterfield
			Holmes 8'; Hudson 55'	Stadium: Saltergate; Attendance: 5,417

8 December 2007 18	Chesterfield	1–1	Bradford City	Chesterfield
	Rooney 13'		Nix 77'	Stadium: Saltergate; Attendance: 3,727

15 December 2007 19	Accrington Stanley	2–1	Chesterfield	Accrington
	Procter 74' (pen.); Dsane 89'		Ward 18'	Stadium: Crown Ground; Attendance: 1,448

22 December 2007 20	Chesterfield	2–0	Mansfield Town	Chesterfield
	Lester 52'; Ward 62'; Gray (red card) 76'			Stadium: Saltergate; Attendance: 6,300

26 December 2007 21	Bury	0–1	Chesterfield	Bury
	Scott (red card) 79'		Leven 45' (pen.)	Stadium: Gigg Lane; Attendance: 3,158

29 December 2007 22	Barnet	0–2	Chesterfield	London
			Rooney 21'; Kovács 80'	Stadium: Underhill; Attendance: 2,346

1 January 2008 23	Chesterfield	2–1	Wrexham	Chesterfield
	Leven 7'; Lester 41'		Evans 68'	Stadium: Saltergate; Attendance: 6,300

5 January 2008 24	Chesterfield	1–2	Grimsby Town	Chesterfield
	Ward 83'		North 45', 78' (pen.)	Stadium: Saltergate; Attendance: 4,540

12 January 2008 25	Brentford	2–1	Chesterfield	London
	Smith 25'; Poole 61'		Lester 41'	Stadium: Griffin Park; Attendance: 4,882

16 January 2008 26	Chesterfield	3–4	Rochdale	Chesterfield
	Downes 49'; Lester 59'; Rooney 90'		Perkins 18', 39', 86'; Murray 89'	Stadium: Saltergate; Attendance: 3,595

21 January 2008 27	Chesterfield	4–0	Hereford United	Chesterfield
	Lowry 2'; Lester 21', 40'; Moloney 90'			Stadium: Saltergate; Attendance: 3,274

26 January 2008 28	Wycombe Wanderers	1–0	Chesterfield	High Wycombe
	McGleish 26'			Stadium: Adams Park; Attendance: 5,203

29 January 2008 29	Stockport County	2–2	Chesterfield	Stockport
	Dickinson 34'; Elding 63'		Fletcher 16'; Lester 51'	Stadium: Edgeley Park; Attendance: 5,203

2 February 2008 30	Chesterfield	1–1	Chester City	Chesterfield
	Lester 54'		Murphy 59'	Stadium: Saltergate; Attendance: 3,701

9 February 2008 31	Grimsby Town	4–2	Chesterfield	Grimsby
	Boshell 19' (pen.), 86' (pen.); North 31'; Hegarty 53'		Cooper 73'; Ward 83'	Stadium: Blundell Park; Attendance: 4,601

13 February 2008 32	Chesterfield	1–2	Peterborough United	Chesterfield
	Leven 87'		Morgan 45'; Boyd 47'; Williams (red card) 90'	Stadium: Saltergate; Attendance: 3,973

16 February 2008 33	Hereford United	2–0	Chesterfield	Hereford
	Mac-Donald 8'; Hooper 45'			Stadium: Edgar Street; Attendance: 3,503

23 February 2008 34	Chesterfield	1–0	Brentford	Chesterfield
	Dowson 4'			Stadium: Saltergate; Attendance: 3,728

1 March 2008 35	Rochdale	0–1	Chesterfield	Rochdale
			Leven 89'	Stadium: Spotland; Attendance: 3,108

7 March 2008 36	Chesterfield	4–1	Lincoln City	Chesterfield
	Kerry 39', 81'; Lester 52'; Leven 59'		Wright 58'	Stadium: Saltergate; Attendance: 4,352

10 March 2008 37	Chesterfield	1–2	Milton Keynes Dons	Chesterfield
	Lowry 69'		Andrews 42'; Dyer 70'	Stadium: Saltergate; Attendance: 3,834

15 March 2008 38	Rotherham United	2–1	Chesterfield	Rotherham
	Holmes 30'; Joseph 45'		Ward 75'	Stadium: Millmoor; Attendance: 4,550

22 March 2008 39	Chesterfield	4–2	Accrington Stanley	Chesterfield
	Niven 31'; Roberts 58' (o.g.); Lowry 59'; Ward 85'		Procter 23', 31' (pen.)	Stadium: Saltergate; Attendance: 3,274

24 March 2008 40	Bradford City	1–0	Chesterfield	Bradford
	Thorne 16'			Stadium: Coral Windows Stadium; Attendance: 13,825

29 March 2008 41	Dagenham & Redbridge	0–3	Chesterfield	London
			Ward 37', 46'; Fletcher 79'	Stadium: Victoria Road; Attendance: 2,054

5 April 2008 42	Chesterfield	4–1	Shrewsbury Town	Chesterfield
	Dowson 47', 90'; Ward 50', 59'		McIntyre 81'	Stadium: Saltergate; Attendance: 3,570

12 April 2008 43	Morecambe	1–1	Chesterfield	Morecambe
	Blinkhorn 74'		Fletcher 35'	Stadium: Christie Park; Attendance: 2,531

19 April 2008 44	Chesterfield	1–1	Darlington	Chesterfield
	Ward 50'		Wright 68'	Stadium: Saltergate; Attendance: 3,809

26 April 2008 45	Macclesfield Town	1–0	Chesterfield	Macclesfield
	Evans 42'			Stadium: Moss Rose; Attendance: 2,573

3 May 2008 46	Chesterfield	1–1	Notts County	Chesterfield
	Lester 59'		Weir-Daley 45'	Stadium: Saltergate; Attendance: 4,477

=== FA Cup ===
10 November 2007 Round 1	Chesterfield	1–2	Tranmere Rovers	Chesterfield
	Lester 29'		Greenacre 37' (pen.); Kay 84'; Curran (red card) 90'	Stadium: Saltergate; Attendance: 4,296

=== League Cup ===
14 August 2007 Round 1	Sheffield United	3–1	Chesterfield	Sheffield
	Stead 14', 45'; Webber 56'		Lester 16'	Stadium: Bramall Lane; Attendance: 11,170

=== Football League Trophy ===
4 September 2007 Northern Section Round 1	Chesterfield	1–3	Hartlepool United	Chesterfield
	Allison 72'		Foley 34'; Brown 51', 59'	Stadium: Saltergate; Attendance: 2,127

== Players ==
=== First-team squad ===
Includes all players who were awarded squad numbers during the season.

Note: Flags indicate national team as defined under FIFA eligibility rules; some limited exceptions apply. Players may hold more than one non-FIFA nationality.

No.	Pos.	Nation	Player
1	GK	IRL	Barry Roche
2	DF	HUN	János Kovács
3	FW	ENG	Jamie Jackson
4	DF	ENG	Jamie Lowry
5	DF	ENG	Phil Picken
6	DF	ENG	Kevin Gray
7	MF	ENG	Jamie Ward
8	MF	SCO	Derek Niven
9	FW	ENG	Adam Smith
10	FW	ENG	Steve Fletcher
11	DF	SCO	Gregor Robertson
14	FW	ENG	Jack Lester
15	DF	AUS	Aaron Downes
16	FW	SCO	Jamie Winter
18	DF	IRL	Alan O'Hare

No.	Pos.	Nation	Player
19	MF	SCO	Peter Leven
20	GK	ENG	Jamie Annerson (on loan from Sheffield United)
21	MF	ENG	Josh Law
23	MF	ENG	Kevin Cooper
24	MF	ENG	Lloyd Kerry (on loan from Sheffield United)
25	FW	ENG	David Dowson (on loan from Sunderland)
26	DF	ENG	Peter Hartley (on loan from Sunderland)
27	DF	IRL	Brendan Moloney (on loan from Nottingham Forest)
28	MF	ENG	Ben Algar
29	FW	ENG	Jake Williams
30	DF	ENG	Paul Roome
31	DF	IRL	Colin Hawkins (on loan from Coventry City)
32	FW	ENG	Bruce Dyer
33	MF	ENG	Graeme Owens (on loan from Middlesbrough)

=== Left club during season ===
Note: Flags indicate national team as defined under FIFA eligibility rules; some limited exceptions apply. Players may hold more than one non-FIFA nationality.

No.	Pos.	Nation	Player
20	FW	ENG	Paul Shaw
23	FW	ENG	Nicky Travis (returned from loan to Sheffield United)
13	MF	GER	Felix Bastians (returned from loan to Nottingham Forest)
20	FW	IRL	Adam Rooney (returned from loan to Stoke City)

No.	Pos.	Nation	Player
17	MF	ENG	Gareth Davies
23	MF	ENG	Michael Barnes (returned from loan to Manchester United)
22	FW	ENG	Wayne Allison
12	GK	ENG	Michael Jordan
