= Gregor Robertson (footballer) =

Scottish footballer

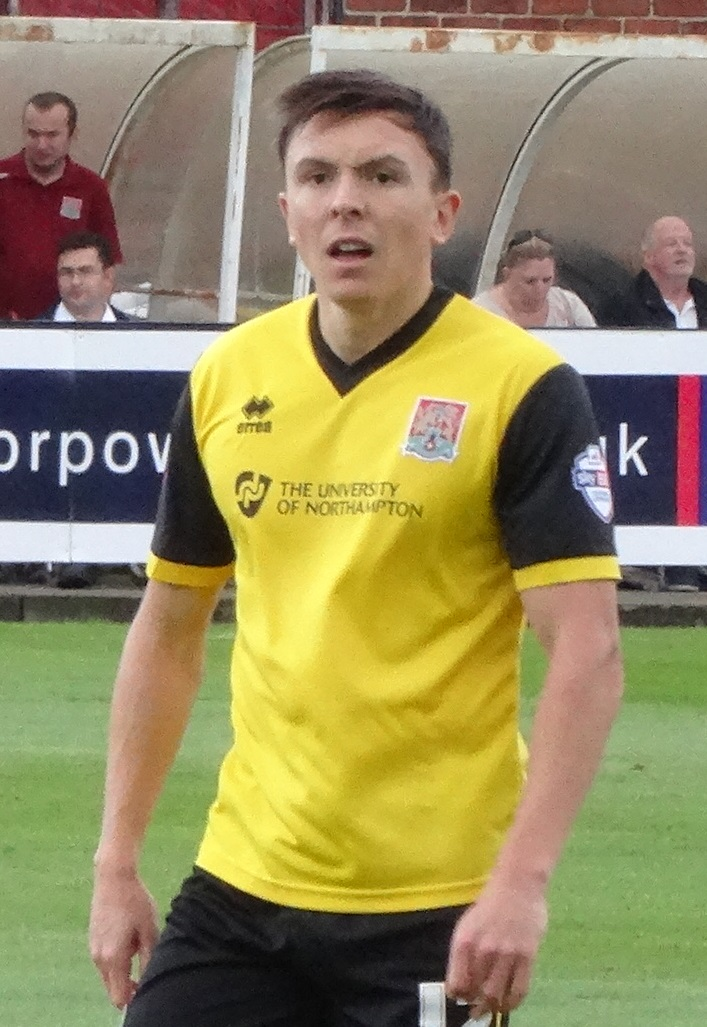
- Robertson playing for Northampton Town in 2014

Personal information
- Full name: Gregor Aedan Robertson
- Date of birth: 19 January 1984 (age 42)
- Place of birth: Edinburgh, Scotland
- Height: 6 ft 2 in (1.88 m)
- Position: Defender

Youth career
- 2000–2001: Heart of Midlothian
- 2001–2002: Nottingham Forest

Senior career*
| Years | Team | Apps | (Gls) |
| 2002–2005 | Nottingham Forest | 36 | (0) |
| 2005–2007 | Rotherham United | 52 | (1) |
| 2007–2012 | Chesterfield | 116 | (3) |
| 2012–2014 | Crewe Alexandra | 32 | (0) |
| 2014–2015 | Northampton Town | 36 | (0) |
| 2015–2016 | Grimsby Town | 38 | (0) |
| Total | | 310 | (4) |

International career
| 2004–2005 | Scotland U21 | 15 | (2) |
- * Club domestic league appearances and goals

Gregor Aedan Robertson (born 19 January 1984) is a Scottish sports journalist and former professional footballer who played as a left back from 2002 to 2016.

During his career, Robertson played for Nottingham Forest, Rotherham United, Chesterfield, Crewe Alexandra and Northampton Town and Grimsby Town. He has also represented Scotland at U21 level.

== Club career ==
=== Nottingham Forest ===
Born in Edinburgh, Robertson started his career as a junior in Heart of Midlothian's youth system but moved south of the border to join Nottingham Forest when he was 17 in February 2001.

After progressing through the Reds' academy, Robertson made his debut in September 2003 against Tranmere Rovers in the League Cup, which Forest won on penalties after a goalless draw.

He made his Championship league debut against local rivals Derby County four days later as a late substitute in a 1–1 draw at the City Ground. His full league debut came the following week against Preston North End in a 1–0 home defeat. On 28 May 2004, boss Joe Kinnear offered Robertson a new one-year deal. On 10 May 2005, he was released by manager Gary Megson.

Robertson went on to make a total of 44 appearances for Nottingham Forest.

=== Rotherham United ===
In June 2005 Robertson signed for League One Rotherham United on a free transfer. He made his debut in a 2–1 home defeat to Walsall in the opening fixture that season.

Robertson spent two years at the club making a total of 56 appearances and scoring one goal in a 2–0 victory away to Swansea City at the Liberty Stadium.

"Gregor can operate at left-back or on the left of midfield and will add much-needed steel to the Millers squad, he is strong, athletic and is the kind of young, mobile player I am looking for."

— His former boss at Rotherham, Mick Harford, speaking in May 2005.

=== Chesterfield ===
Robertson joined League Two side Chesterfield on a two-year contract in June 2007. He made his debut in the Spireites opening league fixture of the season, a 0–0 draw away to Chester City. He netted his first goal for the club in a 3–1 win away at local rivals Mansfield Town that season, scoring direct from a corner kick.

On 2 July 2009, he signed a new one-year deal, which kept him at the club until July 2011. On 4 October 2009 he scored an equaliser in the 15th minute in the 2–2 stalemate against Morecambe, latching on to Darren Currie's cross and volleying home from close range.

In November 2009, Robertson suffered a double leg break in an innocuous tackle in a Football League Trophy tie at home to Carlisle. After a year on the sidelines he returned to action in November 2010 in a 2–0 FA Cup first round victory away to Harrow.

On 8 June 2010, he signed a new one-year deal. Robertson went on to make a total of 23 appearances that season in Chesterfield's 2010/11 League Two winning campaign, enjoying a successful spell at centre half for much of it. However, he suffered an Achilles tendon rupture away to Hereford United in April, ruling him out for the last few games of the season and much of the next.

Robertson returned to action in League One the next season in a 1–0 Boxing Day defeat away to Huddersfield Town and was part of the Football League Trophy winning squad that season.

Robertson made a total of 133 appearances for Chesterfield, scoring three goals.

=== Crewe Alexandra ===
In July 2012, Robertson joined League One side Crewe Alexandra, signing a two-year deal.

On 16 January 2014, Gregor had his contract mutually terminated by the club after making 40 appearances in all competitions for The Alex.

=== Northampton Town ===
On 4 February 2014, Robertson agreed to join League Two side Northampton Town on a deal until the end of the season. He played 15 League games in the club's successful battle against relegation, with the Cobblers guaranteeing their League Two status with a 3–1 victory over Oxford United on the final day of the season. Robertson signed a new one-year contract on 23 May 2014. Gregor was released by Northampton Town on 20 January 2015.

=== Grimsby Town ===
On 26 January 2015, Robertson signed for Conference Premier side Grimsby until the end of the season.

On 11 April 2015, he injured himself in the first half and had to be substituted at half time, in the 1–0 defeat against Wrexham. Scans revealed he had damage to his medial ligament meaning his campaign was likely to be over. Surprisingly, he made a comeback to the starting lineup, due to a hamstring injury sustained to Josh Gowling, Toto Nsiala reverted to his favored centre-back position having previously played at right-back while Robertson was injured, but during the 2015 Conference Premier play-off final against Bristol Rovers at Wembley on 17 May 2015, he had to be substituted in the 72nd minute, being replaced by Daniel Parslow; following a 1–1 draw after extra time, Grimsby lost 5–3 in a penalty shoot-out.

On 29 May 2015, Robertson agreed a new one-year deal with the club. He played in Grimsby's 3–1 victory over Forest Green Rovers in the 2016 National League play-off final at Wembley, seeing Grimsby promoted to League Two after a six-year absence from the Football League. Robertson was released when his contract expired at the end of the season.

== International career ==
Robertson won a total of 15 caps, scoring two goals for Scotland U21s, including one match against Spain's U21 side featuring FIFA World Cup: 2010 winners Andrés Iniesta, Sergio Ramos and Cesc Fàbregas, which the Scots lost 3–1.

On 16 August 2005, a Shaun Maloney corner was flicked on by club-mate Craig Beattie for Robertson to head the opener in the 3-1 comfortable win against Austria U21s. On 7 October 2005, he scored a header to put Scotland U21s into a 2–0 lead on 44 minutes, eventually losing 3–2 against Belarus U21s.

== Media career ==
Following his release from Grimsby, Robertson announced his retirement on Twitter. Since retiring from football, Robertson had moved into sports journalism and writes for The Times.

== Personal life ==
Robertson studied a three-year degree in professional sports writing and broadcasting, journalism at Staffordshire University, and worked at the Nottingham Post as part of a work placement, writing articles. He now works as a football writer, his work including a regular column in The Times newspaper.

On 21 January 2022, Robertson pleaded guilty to headbutting an Uber driver in London on 10 May 2019. The driver had swerved a drunken Robertson who had staggered into the road and had kicked out at the car. Following a further altercation in a nearby petrol station Robertson had headbutted the man and punched his friend when he tried to intervene. Robertson received an 18-month suspended prison sentence and was also fined £3,000 and ordered to pay £2,000 in compensation to the victim.

== Career statistics ==
Appearances and goals by club, season and competition
| Club | Season | League | | | FA Cup | | League Cup | | Other | | Total | |
| Club | Season | Division | Apps | Goals | Apps | Goals | Apps | Goals | Apps | Goals | Apps | Goals |
|---|---|---|---|---|---|---|---|---|---|---|---|---|
| Nottingham Forest | 2003–04 | First Division | 16 | 0 | 2 | 0 | 2 | 0 | — | | 20 | 0 |
| Nottingham Forest | 2004–05 | Championship | 20 | 0 | 2 | 0 | 2 | 0 | — | | 24 | 0 |
| Nottingham Forest | Total | | 36 | 0 | 4 | 0 | 4 | 0 | — | | 44 | 0 |
| Rotherham United | 2005–06 | League One | 34 | 1 | 0 | 0 | 2 | 0 | — | | 36 | 1 |
| Rotherham United | 2006–07 | League One | 18 | 0 | 0 | 0 | 2 | 0 | — | | 20 | 0 |
| Rotherham United | Total | | 52 | 1 | 0 | 0 | 4 | 0 | — | | 56 | 1 |
| Chesterfield | 2007–08 | League Two | 35 | 1 | 1 | 0 | 1 | 0 | 1 (Note: Appearance in Football League Trophy) | 0 | 38 | 1 |
| Chesterfield | 2008–09 | League Two | 38 | 2 | 4 | 0 | 1 | 0 | 1 | 0 | 44 | 2 |
| Chesterfield | 2009–10 | League Two | 10 | 0 | 1 | 0 | 0 | 0 | 3 | 0 | 14 | 0 |
| Chesterfield | 2010–11 | League Two | 21 | 0 | 2 | 0 | 0 | 0 | — | | 23 | 0 |
| Chesterfield | 2011–12 | League One | 12 | 0 | 0 | 0 | 0 | 0 | 2 | 0 | 14 | 0 |
| Chesterfield | Total | | 116 | 3 | 8 | 0 | 2 | 0 | 7 | 0 | 133 | 3 |
| Crewe Alexandra | 2012–13 | League One | 29 | 0 | 2 | 0 | 2 | 0 | 3 | 0 | 36 | 0 |
| Crewe Alexandra | 2013–14 | League One | 3 | 0 | 0 | 0 | 0 | 0 | 1 | 0 | 4 | 0 |
| Crewe Alexandra | Total | | 32 | 0 | 2 | 0 | 2 | 0 | 4 | 0 | 40 | 0 |
| Northampton Town | 2013–14 | League Two | 15 | 0 | — | | — | | — | | 15 | 0 |
| Northampton Town | 2014–15 | League Two | 21 | 0 | 1 | 0 | 2 | 0 | — | | 24 | 0 |
| Northampton Town | Total | | 36 | 0 | 1 | 0 | 2 | 0 | — | | 39 | 0 |
| Grimsby Town | 2014–15 | Conference Premier | 14 | 0 | — | | — | | 1 (Note: One appearance in the Play-Offs) | 0 | 15 | 0 |
| Grimsby Town | 2015–16 | National League | 24 | 0 | 1 | 0 | — | | 8 (Note: Two appearances in the Play-Offs, six appearances in the FA Trophy) | 0 | 33 | 0 |
| Grimsby Town | Total | | 38 | 0 | 1 | 0 | 0 | 0 | 9 | 0 | 48 | 0 |
| Career total | | | 310 | 4 | 16 | 0 | 14 | 0 | 20 | 0 | 360 | 4 |

== Honours ==
Chesterfield

- Football League Two: 2010–11

Grimsby Town

- National League play-offs: 2016
- FA Trophy runner-up: 2015–16
