= 2009–10 Chesterfield F.C. season =

Chesterfield
2009–10 season
- Chairman: Barrie Hubbard
- Manager: John Sheridan
- League Two: 8th
- FA Cup: First round
- League Cup: First round
- Football League Trophy: Area quarter-final

The 2009–10 season was the 143rd season of competitive association football played by Chesterfield Football Club, a professional football club based in Chesterfield, Derbyshire, England. During the 2009–10 season, the club competed in League Two, the fourth tier of English football, for the third year in succession.

== Season summary ==
On 9 June 2009, John Sheridan was named as manager of Chesterfield in League Two. Signing a three-year contract with the club, he appointed Tommy Wright as assistant manager and Mark Crossley as coach. Chesterfield finished eighth in League Two.

At the end of the season, the club left Saltergate, and moved to the newly built B2net Stadium.

== Competitions ==
=== League Two ===
==== League table ====
Pos	Team	Pld	W	D	L	GF	GA	GD	Pts	Promotion, qualification or relegation
6	Aldershot Town	46	20	12	14	69	56	+13	72	Qualification to League Two play-offs
7	Dagenham & Redbridge (O, P)	46	20	12	14	69	58	+11	72	Qualification to League Two play-offs
8	Chesterfield	46	21	7	18	61	62	−1	70	
9	Bury	46	19	12	15	54	59	−5	69	
10	Port Vale	46	17	17	12	61	50	+11	68	

Updated to match(es) played on unknown. Source: football-league.co.uk
(O) Play-off winners; (P) Promoted

==== Results ====
League Two match details
Date	Opponents	Venue	Result	Score F–A	Scorers	Attendance	Ref.
8 August 2009	Torquay United	A	L	0–2		3,966	
15 August 2009	Northampton Town	H	W	1–0	McDermott 32'	3,700	
19 August 2009	Notts County	H	W	2–1	Lowry 78' pen., 80' pen.	6,196	
22 August 2009	Shrewsbury Town	A	D	1–1	Lowry 67'	5,086	
29 August 2009	Morecambe	H	D	1–1	Talbot 75'	3,210	
5 September 2009	Rotherham United	A	L	1–3	Lowry 21' pen.	4,458	
12 September 2009	Dagenham & Redbridge	A	L	1–2	McDermott 86'	2,034	
19 September 2009	Macclesfield Town	H	W	4–1	Small 4', Lester 32', Lowry 37', McDermott 45'	3,138	
26 September 2009	Bradford City	A	L	0–3		11,664	
30 September 2009	Grimsby Town	H	W	3–2	Niven 30', Lester 54', McDermott 69'	3,329	
3 October 2009	Accrington Stanley	H	W	1–0	Small 90+2'	3,104	
10 October 2009	AFC Bournemouth	A	W	2–1	Talbot 15', 45'	5,896	
17 October 2009	Hereford United	A	L	0–1		2,574	
24 October 2009	Burton Albion	H	W	5–2	Hall 13', Allott 24', Lester 81', Talbot 89', McDermott 90+5'	4,218	
31 October 2009	Barnet	H	W	1–0	Boden 64'	3,585	
14 November 2009	Rochdale	A	W	3–2	Lester 25', 28', Perkins 63'	3,011	
21 November 2009	Darlington	H	W	5–2	Page 37', Allott 45+2', Djilali 67', Boden 89', 90+1'	3,460	
24 November 2009	Bury	A	L	1–2	Small 90'	2,504	
2 December 2009	Crewe Alexandra	H	L	2–3	Talbot 73', Lester 89'	3,267	
5 December 2009	Aldershot Town	A	L	0–1		2,977	
12 December 2009	Cheltenham Town	H	W	1–0	Lester 42'	3,145	
26 December 2009	Lincoln City	A	L	1–2	Boden 83'	4,604	
2 January 2010	Shrewsbury Town	H	L	0–1		3,601	
16 January 2010	Torquay United	H	W	1–0	Conlon 72'	3,215	
23 January 2010	Northampton Town	A	D	0–0		4,513	
26 January 2010	Rotherham United	H	L	0–1		4,951	
30 January 2010	Morecambe	A	W	1–0	Gritton 18'	1,967	
6 February 2010	Lincoln City	H	W	2–1	Green 19', Conlon 50'	3,573	
9 February 2010	Port Vale	A	W	2–1	Downes 10', Green 31'	4,090	
13 February 2010	Bury	H	W	1–0	Boden 58'	4,122	
20 February 2010	Darlington	A	W	3–2	Whaley 80', Talbot 81', Byrne 87' o.g.	2,209	
23 February 2010	Crewe Alexandra	A	W	1–0	Talbot 27'	3,278	
27 February 2010	Aldershot Town	H	L	0–1		3,827	
6 March 2010	Cheltenham Town	A	W	1–0	Conlon 41' pen.	3,006	
9 March 2010	Notts County	A	L	0–1		7,341	
13 March 2010	Port Vale	H	L	0–5		4,138	
20 March 2010	Burton Albion	A	D	2–2	Demontagnac 34', Boden 61'	3,696	
27 March 2010	Hereford United	H	L	1–2	Conlon 81' pen.	3,593	
3 April 2010	Rochdale	H	W	2–0	Conlon 68' pen., 83' pen.	4,471	
5 April 2010	Barnet	A	L	1–3	Small 14'	1,916	
10 April 2010	Dagenham & Redbridge	H	D	2–2	Demontagnac 69', Conlon 89' pen.	3,588	
13 April 2010	Grimsby Town	A	D	2–2	Lester 65', 75'	5,648	
17 April 2010	Macclesfield Town	A	L	0–2		2,143	
24 April 2010	Bradford City	H	D	1–1	Demontagnac 79'	4,109	
1 May 2010	Accrington Stanley	A	L	0–2		2,475	
8 May 2010	AFC Bournemouth	H	W	2–1	Lester 80', Niven 90+6'	4,998	

=== FA Cup ===
FA Cup match details
Round	Date	Opponents	Venue	Result	Score F–A	Scorers	Attendance	Ref
First round	7 November 2009	AFC Bournemouth	H	L	1–3	Lester 4'	3,277	

=== League Cup ===
FA Cup match details
Round	Date	Opponents	Venue	Result	Score F–A	Scorers	Attendance	Ref
First round	11 August 2009	Scunthorpe United	A	L	1–2	Currie 72' pen.	2,501	

=== Football League Trophy ===
Football League Trophy match details
Round	Date	Opponents	Venue	Result	Score F–A	Scorers	Attendance	Ref
First round	1 September 2009	Burton Albion	A	W	5–1	Small 17', 62', Talbot 38', 90+3', Lowry 87'	1,493	
Second round	6 October 2009	Huddersfield Town	H	D	3–3 (a.e.t.) (4–2 p)	Talbot 57', 74', Bowery 90'	3,003	
Area quarter-final	10 November 2009	Carlisle United	H	L	1–3	Currie 45+5' pen.	2,878	
