= Drew Talbot =

English footballer (born 1986)

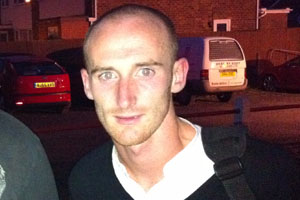
- Talbot in 2010

Personal information
- Full name: Andrew Talbot
- Date of birth: 19 July 1986 (age 40)
- Place of birth: Barnsley, England
- Height: 5 ft 10 in (1.78 m)
- Positions: Full back; midfielder; striker

Youth career
- –2004: Sheffield Wednesday

Senior career*
Years	Team	Apps	(Gls)
2004–2007	Sheffield Wednesday	32	(4)
2007	→ Scunthorpe United (loan)	3	(1)
2007–2009	Luton Town	51	(3)
2009	→ Chesterfield (loan)	17	(2)
2009–2016	Chesterfield	215	(13)
2015	→ Plymouth Argyle (loan)	9	(0)
2016–2017	Portsmouth	9	(0)
2018–2019	Chesterfield	27	(0)
Total		363	(23)
- * Club domestic league appearances and goals

Andrew Talbot (born 19 July 1986) is an English former professional footballer. A versatile player, Talbot predominantly played at right back or on the right wing. He occasionally played at left back and as a left winger, and could also be utilised as a striker.

== Career ==
Born in Barnsley, Talbot started his career at Sheffield Wednesday, promoted through the academy in 2003–04. Often used as a substitute, he scored five goals in Wednesday's 2004–05 promotion season including one against Hartlepool in Cardiff in the Football League One play-off final.

The following season proved a disappointment for Talbot, as a back injury ruled him out for most of the year. After his impressive first full season at Hillsborough, he was not to play again until September 2006, where he made a substitute appearance against Derby County in a 2–1 home defeat. During the January 2007 transfer window, Talbot signed on loan to League One side Scunthorpe United, scoring one goal against Doncaster Rovers in three games. However, his loan deal was cut short as he was instead transferred to Luton Town for a fee of £250,000.

He made his debut for Luton on 27 January 2007 against Blackburn Rovers in the FA Cup. Talbot scored his first goal for Luton on his home league debut against his old club Sheffield Wednesday on 20 February 2007, as well as forcing former teammate Tommy Spurr to score an own goal. Despite a decent goal return he was unable to stop Luton avoiding relegation.

After an epic performance against Liverpool he was labelled the "Ginger Maradona". Plymouth Argyle reportedly bid for Talbot and his strike partner Calvin Andrew. Talbot himself turned down a move to Italian side Brescia on transfer deadline day.

Talbot suffered a serious knee injury in March 2008 against Cheltenham Town. He returned to full training in November 2008, and made eleven appearances for Luton in the 2008–09 season, but scored no goals.

On 27 January 2009, he joined Chesterfield on loan until the end of the season, as one more league appearance for Luton would have resulted in a wage rise for Talbot. His debut came the next day, in the starting line up for a 2–1 win against Exeter at Saltergate. Three days later, he scored against Notts Country to give Chesterfield victory. In total, Talbot played seventeen games in his loan spell, scoring twice.

On 29 July 2009, Talbot joined Chesterfield on a two-year contract after failing to agree to a new deal at Luton. In his first full season at the club he scored ten goals in all competitions, as Chesterfield narrowly missed out on a play-off position.

At Chesterfield, Talbot has been moved from the striker position and is preferred as a right back/right winger by manager John Sheridan. Having spent the first half of a disappointing season for the Spireites at right back, he moved forward again to the wing position after the loan signing of James Hurst, ending a 17 match run without a win and qualifying for the final of the Football League Trophy.

Talbot signed a new two-year contract in the summer of 2013.

Talbot missed the first half of the 2014–15 season after suffering a groin injury during the close season in 2014. He made his first appearance of the 2014–15 season on 27 January 2015, replacing Tendayi Darikwa in the 80th minute of Chesterfield's 3–0 home win over Crawley Town. On 30 January, in an attempt to regain match fitness, Talbot joined Plymouth Argyle on loan until the end of the season, reuniting him with former Chesterfield manager John Sheridan. He made his debut the following day, playing 68 minutes of Plymouth's 3–2 defeat at Hartlepool United.

Talbot was recalled by Chesterfield on 16 March, having played nine games for Plymouth. The following day, he played the full 90 minutes of Chesterfield's 3–0 win over Gillingham.

On 22 May 2015, Talbot signed a one-year extension to his Chesterfield contract.

On 12 May 2016, Talbot was released by the club after his contract expired.

On 22 June 2016, Talbot signed a two-year contract at Portsmouth. The move reunited him with former Chesterfield manager Paul Cook, but he left the club by mutual agreement in December 2017.

Talbot agreed to re-sign for Chesterfield until the end of the season on 21 December 2017, in effect from 1 January 2018.

Talbot was initially released by Chesterfield at the end of the 2017–18 season, but on 15 June he returned to the club after agreeing a new one-year contract. Talbot was then released at the end of the 2018–19 season.

Talbot announced his retirement on 11 July 2019.

== Career statistics ==
Club statistics
Club	Season	League			FA Cup		League Cup		Other		Total	
Club	Season	Division	Apps	Goals	Apps	Goals	Apps	Goals	Apps	Goals	Apps	Goals
Sheffield Wednesday	2004–05	League One	24	5	1	0	0	0	0	0	25	5
Sheffield Wednesday	2006–07	Championship	8	0	0	0	0	0	0	0	8	0
Sheffield Wednesday	Total		32	5	1	0	0	0	0	0	33	5
Scunthorpe United (loan)	2006–07	League One	3	1	0	0	0	0	0	0	3	1
Luton Town	2006–07	League One	15	3	1	0	0	0	0	0	16	3
Luton Town	2007–08	League One	29	0	4	0	3	2	0	0	36	2
Luton Town	2008–09	League Two	7	0	2	0	0	0	2	0	11	0
Luton Town	Total		51	3	7	0	3	2	2	0	63	5
Chesterfield (loan)	2008–09	League Two	17	2	0	0	0	0	0	0	17	2
Chesterfield	2009–10	League Two	30	6	1	0	1	0	3	4	35	10
Chesterfield	2010–11	League Two	44	3	2	0	1	0	2	0	49	3
Chesterfield	2011–12	League One	43	2	1	0	1	0	6	0	51	2
Chesterfield	2012–13	League Two	42	2	2	0	1	0	2	0	47	2
Chesterfield	2013–14	League Two	25	0	2	0	1	0	3	0	31	0
Chesterfield	2014–15	League One	9	0	0	0	0	0	0	0	9	0
Chesterfield	2015–16	League One	22	0	3	0	0	0	1	0	26	0
Chesterfield	Total		232	15	11	0	5	0	17	4	265	19
Plymouth Argyle (loan)	2015	League Two	9	0	0	0	0	0	0	0	9	0
Portsmouth	2016–17	League Two	5	0	0	0	1	0	1	0	7	0
Portsmouth	2017–18	League One	4	0	0	0	1	0	0	0	5	0
Portsmouth	Total		9	0	0	0	2	0	1	0	12	0
Chesterfield	2017–18	League Two	14	0	0	0	0	0	0	0	14	0
Chesterfield	2018–19	National League	13	0	0	0	0	0	0	0	13	0
Career total			363	23	19	0	10	2	20	4	412	30

== Honours ==
Sheffield Wednesday

- Football League One play-offs: 2005

Chesterfield

- Football League Two: 2010–11, 2013–14
- Football League Trophy: 2011–12; runner-up: 2013–14
