= Lee Askham =

English footballer

Personal information
- Full name: Lee Raymond Askham
- Date of birth: 25 February 1990 (age 36)
- Place of birth: Killamarsh, England
- Height: 5 ft 10 in (1.78 m)
- Position: Midfielder

Youth career
- ?–2006: Killamarsh Dynamos
- 2006–2008: Sheffield United

Senior career*
Years	Team	Apps	(Gls)
2008–2009	Chesterfield	1	(0)
2009	→ Garforth Town (loan)		
2009–2010	Guiseley		

International career
2005	England U16	1	(0)
2006	England U17	1	(0)
- * Club domestic league appearances and goals as of 21:31, 27 July 2010 (UTC)

Lee Raymond Askham (born 25 February 1990) is an English footballer who played for Chesterfield in League Two during the 2008–09 season.

== Career ==
=== Club career ===
Beginning as an apprentice at Sheffield United, Askham was released in May 2008, and had a trial at Manchester United in September of the same year. He signed for Chesterfield three months later on a one-month contract, which was extended to the end of the season in January 2009. He was sent out on loan to Garforth Town in March 2009, but returned to Chesterfield in May. He made his Chesterfield debut on 2 May 2009, coming on as a 70th-minute substitute for Scott Boden in a 2–0 home defeat by Bradford City. However, after just six months with the Spireites, he was released.

Askham joined Northern Premier League Premier Division club Guiseley in September 2009.

=== International career ===
Askham represented England at under-17 level.
