= 2011–12 Football League Trophy =

Johnstone's Paint Trophy

Tournament details
- Country: England; Wales
- Teams: 48

Final positions
- Champions: Chesterfield
- Runners-up: Swindon Town

Tournament statistics
- Matches played: 49
- Goals scored: 137 (2.8 per match)
- Top goal scorer(s): (Finland) Shefki Kuqi (United States) Mike Grella (4 goals each)

The 2011–12 Football League Trophy, known as the Johnstone's Paint Trophy for sponsorship reasons, is the 31st season in the history of the competition. It is a knock-out tournament for English football clubs in League One and League Two, the third and fourth tiers of English football.

In all, 48 clubs will enter the competition. It is split into two sections, Northern and Southern, with the winners of each section contesting the final at Wembley Stadium.

Carlisle United are the defending champions, but were beaten by Accrington Stanley in the first round.

The winners of the competition were Chesterfield, beating Swindon Town 2-0 in the final.

== First round ==
The draw for the first round of the competition took place on 13 August 2011. Sixteen clubs were given a bye into the second round, and the remaining 32 clubs, including the holders, were divided into four geographical regions.

=== Northern section ===
Tie no	Home team	Score	Away team	Attendance
North-West
1	Bury	0–0	Crewe Alexandra	1,295
Crewe Alexandra won 4 – 2 on penalties
2	Tranmere Rovers	1–1	Port Vale	2,546
Tranmere Rovers won 4 – 2 on penalties
3	Walsall	2–1	Shrewsbury Town	2,605
4	Accrington Stanley	3–2	Carlisle United	1,069
North-East
5	Scunthorpe United	2–0	Hartlepool United	1,763
6	Bradford City	0–0	Sheffield Wednesday	3,519
Bradford City won 3 –1 on penalties
7	Northampton Town	1–2	Huddersfield Town	1,776
8	Burton Albion	1–2	Sheffield United	2,725

=== Southern section ===
Tie no	Home team	Score	Away team	Attendance
South-West
1	Bournemouth	4–1	Hereford United	2,489
2	Cheltenham Town	2–1	Torquay United	1,247
3	Exeter City	1–1	Plymouth Argyle	3,940
Exeter City won 3 – 0 on penalties
4	Wycombe Wanderers	3–1	Bristol Rovers	771
South-East
5	Milton Keynes Dons	3–3	Brentford	4,175
Brentford won 4 – 3 on penalties
6	Colchester United	1–3	Barnet	1,747
7	Leyton Orient	1–1	Dagenham & Redbridge	1,420
Dagenham & Redbridge won 14 – 13 on penalties
8	Southend United	1–0	Crawley Town	2,053

Byes

Northern section
Chesterfield, Macclesfield Town, Morecambe, Notts County, Oldham Athletic, Preston North End, Rochdale, Rotherham United.

Southern section
AFC Wimbledon, Aldershot Town, Charlton Athletic, Gillingham, Oxford United, Stevenage, Swindon Town, Yeovil Town.

== Second round ==
The second round draw took place on 3 September 2011, with matches played in the week commencing 3 October 2011.

=== Northern section ===
Tie no	Home team	Score	Away team	Attendance
North-West
1	Accrington Stanley	0–1	Tranmere Rovers	1,509
Note: First match was abandoned
2	Morecambe	2–2	Preston North End	4,385
Preston North End won 7 – 6 on penalties
3	Crewe Alexandra	1–0	Macclesfield Town	2,271
4	Rochdale	1–1	Walsall	2,089
Rochdale won 3 – 1 on penalties
North-East
5	Rotherham United	1–2	Sheffield United	6,737
6	Scunthorpe United	0–1	Oldham Athletic	2,106
7	Notts County	1–3	Chesterfield	2,293
8	Huddersfield Town	2–2	Bradford City	10,489
Bradford City won 4 – 3 on penalties

=== Southern section ===
Tie no	Home team	Score	Away team	Attendance
South-West
1	Bournemouth	3–2	Yeovil Town	1,416
2	Wycombe Wanderers	1–3	Cheltenham Town	931
3	Aldershot Town	1–2	Oxford United	1,429
4	Exeter City	1–2	Swindon Town	2,627
South-East
5	AFC Wimbledon	2–2	Stevenage	1,416
AFC Wimbledon won 4 – 3 on penalties
6	Charlton Athletic	0–3	Brentford	3,486
7	Gillingham	1–3	Barnet	1,278
8	Dagenham & Redbridge	1–3	Southend United	2,395

== Area Quarter-finals ==
The area quarter finals draw took place on 8 October 2011, with matches played in the week commencing 8 November 2011.

=== Northern section ===
Tie no	Home team	Score	Away team	Attendance
1	Rochdale	1–1	Preston North End	2,395
Preston North End won 4 – 2 on penalties
2	Chesterfield	4–3	Tranmere Rovers	3,152
3	Sheffield United	1–1	Bradford City	5,692
Bradford City won 6 – 5 on penalties
4	Oldham Athletic	3–1	Crewe Alexandra	2,163

=== Southern section ===
Tie no	Home team	Score	Away team	Attendance
1	Swindon Town	1–1	AFC Wimbledon	4.329
Swindon Town won 3 – 1 on penalties
2	Cheltenham Town	0–2	Barnet	1,388
3	Oxford United	0–1	Southend United	2,415
4	Brentford	6–0	Bournemouth	3,015

== Area Semi-finals ==
The area semi finals draw took place on 12 November 2011, with matches played in the week commencing 5 December 2011.

=== Northern section ===
Tie no	Home team	Score	Away team	Attendance
1	Oldham Athletic	2–0	Bradford City	5,697
2	Preston North End	1–1	Chesterfield	5,835
Chesterfield won 4 – 2 on penalties

=== Southern section ===
Tie no	Home team	Score	Away team	Attendance
1	Southend United	1–2	Swindon Town	3,981
2	Barnet	0–0	Brentford	1,970
Barnet won 5 – 3 on penalties

== Area finals ==
The area finals, which serve as the semi-finals for the entire competition, were contested over two legs, home and away. 1st Leg ties due to be played by 18 January 2012. A 2nd Leg tie will be played on Monday 30 January 2012 and another on 7 February 2012

=== Northern section ===
17 January 2012	Chesterfield	2–1	Oldham Athletic	B2net Stadium, Chesterfield
19:45 GMT	Boden 49'; Whitaker 66'; Thompson (yellow card) 52'; Hurst (yellow card) 53'; Davis (yellow card) 71'; Lester (yellow card) 79'	Report	Simpson 57'	Attendance: 5,724; Referee: Phil Gibbs

30 January 2012	Oldham Athletic	0–1	Chesterfield	Boundary Park, Oldham
19:45 GMT	Simpson (yellow card) 69'	Report	Lester 89' Robertson (yellow card) 38'; Hurst (yellow card) 62'; Davis (yellow card) 76'	Attendance: 5,622; Referee: Roger East

Chesterfield won 3–1 on aggregate

=== Southern section ===
10 January 2012	Barnet	1–1	Swindon Town	Underhill Stadium, London
19:45 GMT	Hughes 72'; Deering (yellow card) 29'	Report	Flint 44'; McCormack (yellow card) 77'	Attendance: 3,915; Referee: Nigel Miller

7 February 2012	Swindon Town	1–0	Barnet	County Ground, Swindon
19:45 GMT	Connell 17'; Kennedy (yellow card) 80'; Risser (yellow card) 90'		Hughes (yellow card) 28'; Saville (yellow card) 37'; Dennehy (yellow card) 63'; Taylor (red card) 85'; Mustoe (yellow card) 90'	Attendance: 10,406; Referee: Darren Deadman

Swindon Town won 2–1 on aggregate

== Final ==
25 March 2012
14:00 BST

Chesterfield	2–0	Swindon Town
Risser 47' (o.g.); Westcarr 90+4'

Wembley Stadium, London
Attendance: 49,602
Referee: Anthony Bates
