= Jamie Ward =

Footballer (born 1986)

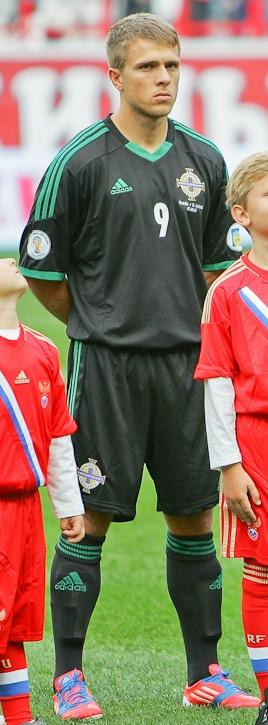
- Ward with Northern Ireland in 2012

Personal information
- Full name: Jamie John Ward
- Date of birth: 12 May 1986 (age 40)
- Place of birth: Birmingham, England
- Height: 5 ft 3 in (1.60 m)
- Positions: Forward; winger

Team information
- Current team: Phoenix United (manager)

Youth career
- –2005: Aston Villa

Senior career*
Years	Team	Apps	(Gls)
2005–2006	Aston Villa	0	(0)
2006	→ Stockport County (loan)	9	(1)
2006–2007	Torquay United	25	(9)
2007–2009	Chesterfield	67	(29)
2009–2011	Sheffield United	63	(9)
2011	→ Derby County (loan)	13	(5)
2011–2015	Derby County	125	(29)
2015–2019	Nottingham Forest	57	(3)
2016–2017	→ Burton Albion (loan)	18	(4)
2018	→ Cardiff City (loan)	4	(0)
2018	→ Charlton Athletic (loan)	9	(1)
2019–2020	Scunthorpe United	6	(2)
2020–2021	Solihull Moors	19	(3)
2021–2022	Buxton	33	(17)
2022–2023	Ilkeston Town	5	(1)
2023–2024	Nuneaton Borough	2	(0)
2024–2025	Precision	13	(6)
Total		468	(119)

International career^{‡}
	Northern Ireland U18	2	(0)
2006–2008	Northern Ireland U21	7	(2)
2011–2018	Northern Ireland	35	(4)

Managerial career
- 2022–2023: Ilkeston Town (player-manager)
- 2026–: Phoenix United
- * Club domestic league appearances and goals as of 08:09, 2 May 2025 (UTC) ‡ National team caps and goals as of 10:48, 30 December 2018 (UTC)

Jamie John Ward (born 12 May 1986) is a former professional footballer who played as a striker. He has represented the Northern Ireland national team. He is currently manager of UAE Third Division League club Phoenix United.

Born in Birmingham he began his career with his home-town club Aston Villa but failed to break into the first team and following a spell on loan at Stockport County he joined Torquay United. From there Ward had signed first for Chesterfield and then Sheffield United before joining Derby County in 2011 and later Nottingham Forest in 2015. Ward qualifies for Northern Ireland through his grandfather. He was included in the Northern Ireland national team for the UEFA Euro 2016, where they reached the round of 16.

== Club career ==
=== Aston Villa ===
Ward began his career as a trainee with Aston Villa and played in their 2004 FA Youth Cup Final defeat against Middlesbrough. He turned professional in July 2005 after recovering from injuries received in a car crash in 2004.

Although Ward captained Aston Villa's reserve team, he did not make a first-team appearance and in March 2006 he joined Stockport County on loan until the end of the season, making his league debut in a 1–0 victory away to Bury on 7 March. He made nine appearances, scoring once in a 3–1 home victory against Shrewsbury Town.

=== Torquay United ===
At the end of the 2005–06 season, Ward was released by Aston Villa and on 6 July 2006 he signed a three-year contract with Ian Atkins' Torquay United, despite interest from Stockport County and Wrexham. However, with a change of ownership and manager at Torquay, Ward asked for a transfer in December 2006.

=== Chesterfield ===
Ward joined Chesterfield, managed by former Torquay manager Roy McFarland, on 31 January 2007 on a two-and-a-half-year contract for a reported fee of £90,000.

He started the 2007–08 season brightly, but in only his second game, against Sheffield United, he again pulled his hamstring. He fought back to match fitness and scored twelve goals for the Spireites that season.

He began the 2008–09 season as a first choice, with his form attracting attention from higher-level clubs such as Derby County and Sheffield United. He rejected the offer of a new contract with Chesterfield in December 2008, with his existing contract set to expire at the end of the season. In January 2009, Championship side Barnsley made a bid for Ward for £400,000 which had been accepted. However, the move was called off after he failed to agree personal terms with the club.

=== Sheffield United ===
Having rejected Barnsley, Ward finally agreed a three-and-a-half-year deal with Sheffield United in January 2009 with the clubs agreeing a fee of around £330,000.

Ward scored his first goal for the Blades in only his second appearance, a 2–1 win at Southampton in February of the same year. The Blades had conceded an injury time equaliser before Ward regained the lead in the 93rd minute. He then played regularly for the remainder of the season, scoring a further goal in the process. His season finished on a low note however as he was sent off for two handballs in the 2009 play-off final against Burnley at Wembley.

Having been suspended for the first two games of the following season Ward returned in fine form, scoring four goals in seven games, including the opener in the Bramall Lane leg of that season's Steel City derby against the Owls. Unfortunately he was stretchered off the field later in that game following a suspected hamstring tear. On returning to the team in November Ward played regularly without ever really regaining his early form before again succumbing to an injury in April which sidelined him for the remainder of the season.

Returning to fitness Ward started the 2010–2011 campaign as a regular first team player once more but an early suspension following a red card in the local derby against Leeds United coupled with further injury problems and a loss of form meant that he could not hold down a regular spot in the first team.

=== Derby County ===
==== 2010–11 season ====
As the Blades struggled, and with new manager Micky Adams seeking to re-build the team, Ward was loaned to fellow relegation-threatened Championship team Derby County in mid-February for three months, with a view to a permanent deal. Ward made his debut on 19 February, starting in a 0–0 draw with Scunthorpe United. He also started the next game, a 1–0 defeat to Hull City, but missed the third, a 1–0 win at his parent club Sheffield United, as he was ineligible under the terms of his loan. He started all of the next 10 games, helping the relegation-threatened side to two wins and four draws. His first goal for the club was a penalty in a 2–1 defeat against Middlesbrough on 8 March. He scored again on 19 March, a stunning 35-yard strike in a 2–2 draw against Crystal Palace. For his efforts, he was named in the Championship's "Team of the Week". He then won 2 penalties in 2 games, the first for a late consolation in a 4–1 defeat to Cardiff City on 2 April, and the second for Derby's equaliser in a 2–2 draw with Coventry City on 9 April.

He scored again in the following game, a 2–1 win against fierce rivals Leeds United on 12 April. His fourth goal for the club was a 20-yard strike in the 30th minute against Burnley on 23 April to put The Rams 2–1 up. In the 61st minute, he conceded a penalty and was shown a straight red card for fouling former Derby defender Tyrone Mears in the 18-yard box. Burnley went on to win the match 4–2. Ward was suspended for the next 2 games and returned for the final match of the season, against Reading on 7 May. He equalised with a stunning 25-yard goal but Derby went on to lose the match 2–1. Derby avoided relegation to League One, something his parent club failed to manage. With his loan spell adjudged a success, two days after the end of Derby's season, Ward signed a permanent 2-year contract with the option of a year extension, for an undisclosed fee.

==== 2011–12 season ====
On 17 September 2011, Ward scored his first goal as a full Derby player with the equaliser against rivals Nottingham Forest, as Derby recorded a 2–1 win. The goal won the club's Goal of the Season award. Ward started all of Derby's (32 games, four goals) league games (bar the League Cup game against Shrewsbury Town when he was on international duty). Ward's run of starts ended after the game against Leicester City when Ward picked up a thigh injury whilst on international duty on 29 February. Ward was out of action for five weeks, before making his first team return in a goalless draw against Ipswich Town on 7 April 2012. In the game against Cardiff City on 17 April 2012, Ward was substituted early in the second half after picking up a dead leg. Ward was fit enough to start the following game at Portsmouth.

Despite his contract still having a year to run, Derby coach John Metgod stated that the club were in contract talks with Ward during April 2012. Ward signed a new two-year contract on 19 April 2012, with an option for a further year which will extend his stay at Derby until at least the summer of 2014. Derby manager Nigel Clough stated in a July 2012 interview that Ward could feature more as a striker in the 2012–13 season.

==== 2012–13 season ====
Ward went on to start the first four league games of the season as a striker, providing an assist in the 2–2 home draw against Sheffield Wednesday and providing two assists and scoring Derby's fifth goal in the 5–1 home win against Watford.

Ward scored his first brace for the club in a 3–2 win against Charlton Athletic, a 25-yard volley and a penalty. and scored again four days later opening the scoring in a 2–1 loss against Burnley. In October 2012, Ward picked up a Grade One tear of his hamstring during the East Midlands derby game at Nottingham Forest. Two months later, on 6 December, Clough stated he was uncertain when Ward would return to the squad and stated his frustration at the injury. However, a day before Derby's game at Charlton Athletic on 29 December, Clough said that Ward was set to return to the matchday squad as a substitute after a three-month absence. Ward featured as a 68th-minute substitute and scored the equalising penalty in the 72nd minute in the 1–1 draw against Charlton. However, he picked up an injury in the match and was replaced in the 83rd minute. Ward missed the following game due to the injury.

Ward scored six times in January and February 2013, which took his tally to eleven goals, overtaking previous top scorer Theo Robinson on nine. However, Ward picked up a new hamstring injury on 1 March, during Derby's 1–0 loss to Crystal Palace. He was absent from the team until 16 March, when he played 63 minutes in Derby's 2–1 win at home to Leicester City. On 29 March he scored his 12th goal of the season in Derby's 3–0 over Bristol City. Ward also missed a penalty after 3 minutes of the match. He missed the next game, a 2–1 win against Leeds United, but played the final five games of the season, missing another penalty against Ipswich Town. Ward finished third in the voting for Derby County's player of the season despite missing significant portions of the season through injury and was also named the 87th best player in the 2012–13 Football League Championship by the Actim Index.

==== 2013–14 season ====
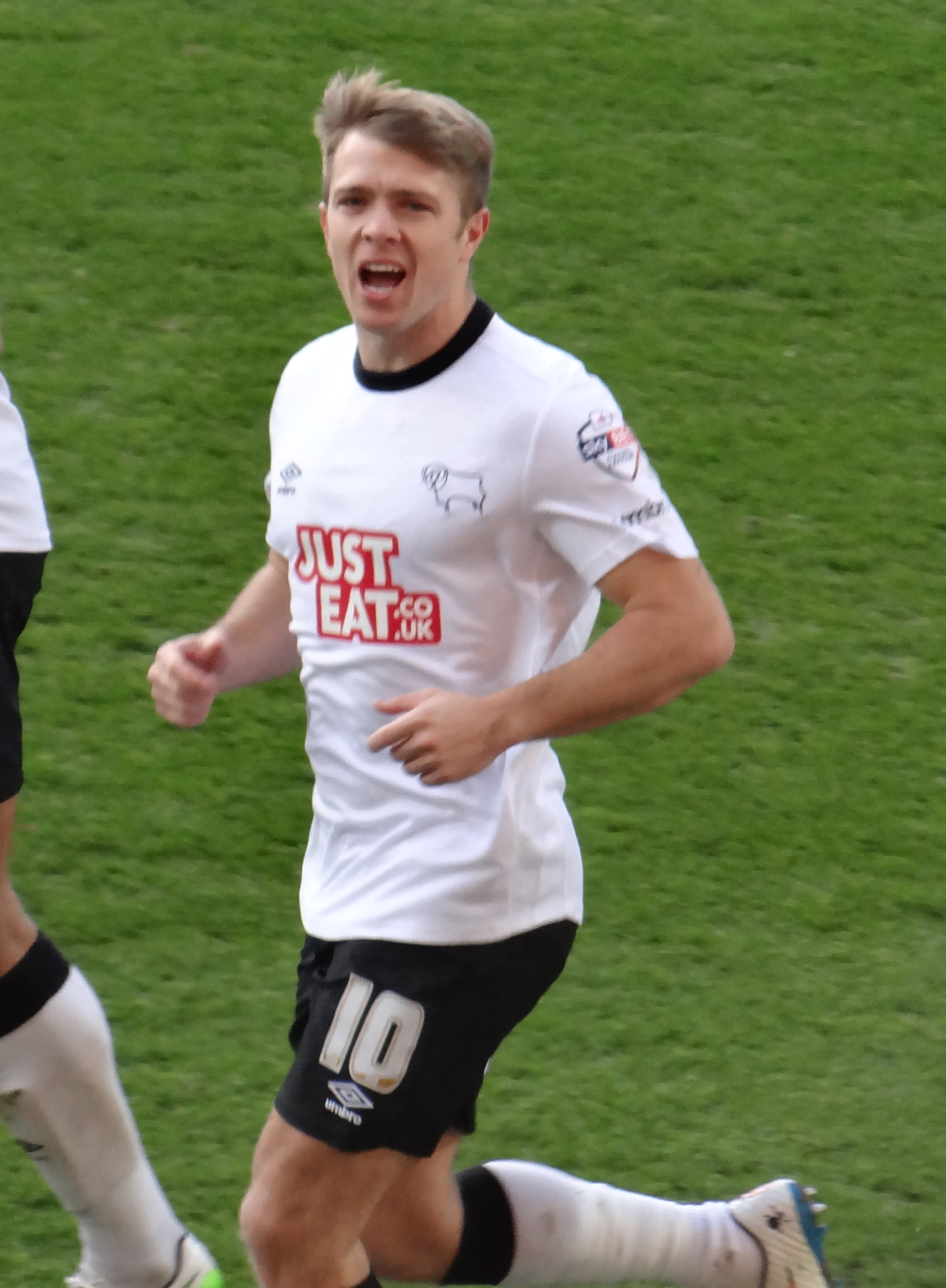
Ward playing for Derby County in 2015.

Ward played in all of Derby's first 16 league games, starting 14 of them. He scored his first goal of the season on 1 October in a 4–4 draw against Ipswich Town at Pride Park. He scored a brace against Watford in a 3–2 away win on 19 October and another in the following game, a 1–1 draw with Birmingham City on 26 October.

He scored the only goal of the game on 23 November as Derby beat AFC Bournemouth 1–0, powering home a Craig Forsyth cross past former Derby goalkeeper Lee Camp. He was substituted in the 79th minute after injuring his knee and after precautionary scans, he was ruled out for a fortnight. However, he only missed one match and returned ahead of schedule, in the club's 2–1 win against Middlesbrough on 4 December. He scored his sixth goal of the season, a 25-yard free kick, in a 2–0 win at Charlton Athletic on 14 December.

=== Nottingham Forest ===
On 2 July 2015, Ward signed for Derby's arch-rivals Nottingham Forest on a four-year deal, after his contract with Derby had expired at the end of the season. This was a somewhat unexpected transfer, given that Ward had often played a controversial and provocative role in recent games between the two sides. Ward acknowledged this in an interview with BBC East Midlands Today, but stressed that his focus was now on Forest:

"I think quite a few people will be surprised but I am delighted to be here and Nottingham Forest is the only thing that counts now... [the controversy] was to spice up the local rivalry and it got me a bit more stick than I wanted. I enjoyed it at the time but hopefully the fans can see past that and get behind me."

Ward scored his first goal for the club in an FA Cup tie against Queens Park Rangers on 9 January 2016. This was followed up a week later by his first league goal, and two assists, in a man-of-the-match performance against Bolton Wanderers. His good form continued with Ward scoring to secure Nottingham Forest an away victory against Middlesbrough, who were at the top of the table prior to this fixture.

==== Loan to Burton Albion ====
On 31 August 2016, Ward was loaned to Championship rivals Burton Albion until the end of the 2016–17 season. He scored his first goal for the club in a 1–1 draw with Queens Park Rangers on 27 September 2016. On 20 January 2017 Ward's loan to Burton was terminated, and he returned to Nottingham Forest.

==== Loan to Cardiff City ====
On 31 January 2018, Ward joined Cardiff City on loan for the remainder of the 2017–18 season in a swap deal involving Lee Tomlin moving to Forest on loan. His debut came on 13 February against Bolton Wanderers, however, he suffered an injury 13 minutes into the game, resulting in his substitution.

==== Loan to Charlton Athletic ====
On 31 August 2018, Ward joined League One side Charlton Athletic on loan until 1 January 2019.

=== Scunthorpe United ===
On 25 September 2019, Ward joined League Two club Scunthorpe United on a deal until January 2020.

=== Solihull Moors ===
On 2 October 2020, Ward joined National League side Solihull Moors on a one-year deal.

=== Buxton ===
On 13 August 2021, Ward joined Northern Premier League side Buxton.

=== Ilkeston Town ===
Ward left Buxton at the end of the 2021–22 season following them winning the league and gaining promotion. He subsequently signed for newly-promoted Northern Premier League Premier Division side Ilkeston Town after they had won the Division One Midlands. On 6 September 2022, Ward was named interim manager of the club before being given the job on a permanent basis on the 21st of the month.

On 28 July 2023, Ward was announced to be departing the club via mutual consent following that evening's pre-season friendly.

=== Precision Football ===
In January 2024, Ward joined UAE Third Division League side Precision. Following promotion, he signed a one-year contract extension in September 2024.

== International career ==
Born in Birmingham in the West Midlands, Ward qualifies for Northern Ireland through his grandfather. He made two appearances for the Northern Ireland under-18 team and a further seven for the under-21 team. After a promising start to his career at Sheffield United, Ward was called into the senior team in March 2009 ahead of two World Cup qualifiers against Poland and Slovenia. Ward was an unused substitute for the two games in which Northern Ireland won back-to-back games and possibly enhanced their chance of reaching the World Cup in South Africa.

Ward won his first full cap for Northern Ireland in a Euro 2012 qualifier against the Faroe Islands on 10 August 2011, with his first start coming in a 2–0 defeat away to Russia in their first 2014 FIFA World Cup qualifier. On 6 September 2013, Ward scored his first goal in a 2–4 home defeat against Portugal. On 28 May 2016, Jamie Ward was named in Michael O'Neill's squad for Euro 2016.

== Coaching career ==
On 29 July 2026, Ward was appointed manager of UAE Third Division League club Phoenix United following the club's admission to the division.

== Career statistics ==
=== Club ===
As of match played 23 April 2022

Appearances and goals by club, season and competition
Club	Season	League			FA Cup		League Cup		Other		Total	
Club	Season	Division	Apps	Goals	Apps	Goals	Apps	Goals	Apps	Goals	Apps	Goals
Aston Villa	2005–06	Premier League	0	0	0	0	0	0	—		0	0
Stockport County (loan)	2005–06	League Two	9	1	—		—		—		9	1
Torquay United	2006–07	League Two	25	9	2	2	1	0	1 (Note: Appearances in EFL Trophy)	0	29	11
Chesterfield	2006–07	League One	9	3	—		—		—		9	3
Chesterfield	2007–08	League Two	35	12	0	0	1	0	0	0	36	12
Chesterfield	2008–09	League Two	23	14	4	2	1	0	1	0	29	16
Chesterfield	Total		67	29	4	2	2	0	1	0	74	31
Sheffield United	2008–09	Championship	16	2	—		—		2 (Note: Appearances in Championship play-offs)	0	18	2
Sheffield United	2009–10	Championship	28	7	3	1	0	0	—		31	8
Sheffield United	2010–11	Championship	19	0	1	1	1	0	—		21	1
Sheffield United	Total		63	9	4	2	1	0	2	0	70	11
Derby County (loan)	2010–11	Championship	13	5	—		—		—		13	5
Derby County	2011–12	Championship	37	4	2	0	0	0	—		39	4
Derby County	2012–13	Championship	25	12	1	0	0	0	—		26	12
Derby County	2013–14	Championship	38	7	1	0	0	0	3	0	42	7
Derby County	2014–15	Championship	25	6	3	0	1	0	—		29	6
Derby County	Total		138	34	7	0	1	0	3	0	149	34
Nottingham Forest	2015–16	Championship	31	2	2	1	1	0	—		34	3
Nottingham Forest	2016–17	Championship	18	1	—		2	1	—		20	2
Nottingham Forest	2017–18	Championship	8	0	0	0	0	0	—		8	0
Nottingham Forest	2018–19	Championship	0	0	—		0	0	—		0	0
Nottingham Forest	Total		57	3	2	1	3	1	0	0	62	5
Burton Albion (loan)	2016–17	Championship	18	4	1	0	—		—		19	4
Cardiff City (loan)	2017–18	Championship	4	0	—		—		—		4	0
Charlton Athletic (loan)	2018–19	League One	9	1	1	0	—		1	0	11	1
Scunthorpe United	2019–20	League Two	6	2	0	0	0	0	0	0	6	2
Solihull Moors	2020–21	National League	19	3	2	0	—		2 (Note: Appearances in FA Trophy)	0	23	3
Buxton	2021–22	NPL Premier Division	33	17	7	3	—		1	0	41	20
Career totals			448	112	30	10	8	1	11	0	497	123

=== International ===
As of match played 15 November 2018

Appearances and goals by national team and year
National team	Year	Apps	Goals
Northern Ireland	2011	1	0
Northern Ireland	2012	3	0
Northern Ireland	2013	5	1
Northern Ireland	2014	4	1
Northern Ireland	2015	5	0
Northern Ireland	2016	11	1
Northern Ireland	2017	3	1
Northern Ireland	2018	3	0
Total		35	4

As of 26 March 2017
Scores and results list Northern Ireland's goal tally first, score column indicates score after each Ward goal.

List of international goals scored by Jamie Ward
No.	Date	Venue	Cap	Opponent	Score	Result	Competition	Ref
1	6 September 2013	Windsor Park, Belfast, Northern Ireland	6	Portugal	2–1	2–4	2014 FIFA World Cup qualification	
2	14 October 2014	Karaiskakis Stadium, Piraeus, Greece	13	Greece	1–0	2–0	UEFA Euro 2016 qualifying	
3	8 October 2016	Windsor Park, Belfast, Northern Ireland	28	San Marino	3–0	4–0	2018 FIFA World Cup qualification	
4	26 March 2017	Windsor Park, Belfast, Northern Ireland	30	Norway	1–0	2–0	2018 FIFA World Cup qualification	
