= Scott Boden =

English footballer (born 1989)

Personal information
- Full name: Scott David Boden
- Date of birth: 19 December 1989 (age 36)
- Place of birth: Sheffield, England
- Position: Forward

Team information
- Current team: Retford FC

Youth career
- –2007: Sheffield United

Senior career*
Years	Team	Apps	(Gls)
2007–2008	Sheffield United	0	(0)
2008	→ IFK Mariehamn (loan)	5	(0)
2008–2013	Chesterfield	104	(15)
2011	→ Macclesfield Town (loan)	7	(0)
2013	→ Alfreton Town (loan)	13	(3)
2013–2014	Macclesfield Town	40	(18)
2014–2015	FC Halifax Town	38	(10)
2015–2016	Newport County	45	(13)
2016–2017	Inverness Caledonian Thistle	13	(1)
2017–2018	Wrexham	34	(3)
2018–2019	Gateshead	29	(11)
2019–2021	Chesterfield	58	(23)
2021	→ Torquay United (loan)	18	(6)
2021–2022	Boreham Wood	44	(11)
2022	York City	4	(0)
2022–2024	Buxton	30	(4)
2024–2024	Matlock Town	16	(3)
2024–	Retford FC	74	(32)
- * Club domestic league appearances and goals as of 12:28, 10 January 2024 (UTC)

Scott David Boden (born 19 December 1989) is an English professional footballer who plays as a forward for club Retford FC.

== Career ==
Boden was born in Streatham. In 2008, Boden was loaned out from Sheffield United to play five matches for IFK Mariehamn in the Finnish Premier Division. Boden left Åland for England and Chesterfield after his stint at the Mariehamn based club.

In October 2011 Boden moved to Macclesfield Town on a one-month loan.

He was offered a new one-year contract by Chesterfield in May 2012 which Boden accepted. On 31 January 2013, having struggled to get regular football at Chesterfield, Boden moved on loan to Conference Premier side Alfreton Town until 20 April. After three goals in thirteen appearances Boden was recalled two weeks early following an injury to Marc Richards. He made one further appearance for Chesterfield following his loan, before being released at the end of the season.

On 29 July 2013, following a successful trial period, Boden signed for former club Macclesfield Town on a permanent basis, penning a one-year contract.

Following a successful season which saw Boden score 18 goals for Macclesfield in the Conference Premier he was signed by FC Halifax Town on 1 July 2014.

On 13 July 2015 Boden joined League Two club Newport County on a one-year contract. He made his debut for Newport on 8 August 2015 versus Cambridge United. Boden scored his first competitive goal for Newport on 11 August 2015 versus Wolverhampton Wanderers in the Football League Cup first round. He scored his first league goal for Newport on 15 August 2015 in a League Two match versus Stevenage. On 5 December 2015 Boden scored the only goal in a 1–0 win over Barnet in the FA Cup 2nd round, which saw Newport County make the 3rd round of the FA Cup for the first time since 1986. Boden finished the season as Newport's top scorer with 15 goals in all competitions.

At the end of the 2015–16 season, Boden was offered a new contract by Newport but he chose to move on to Inverness Caledonian Thistle on a three-year deal. However, Boden was released by Inverness after his first season.

On 6 July 2017, Boden joined Wrexham on a one-year deal. He made his debut on 5 August 2017, against former club Macclesfield Town in a 0–1 home defeat.

He was released by Wrexham on 14 May 2018.

Boden was signed by Gateshead on 20 July 2018.

On 30 January 2019, Boden re-joined former club Chesterfield on an 18-month contract.

On 23 February 2021, Boden joined National League side Torquay United on loan for the remainder of the 2020-21 season.

Boden was released at the end of the 2020–21 season. He subsequently joined fellow National League side Boreham Wood in August 2021 on a one-year deal with the option of a further twelve-months.

On 6 June 2022, Boden joined National League side York City on a permanent move after being released by Boreham Wood.

In January 2024, Boden joined Northern Premier League Premier Division club Matlock Town following a spell with National League North club Buxton.

On Tuesday 7 October 2025, Boden was an unused substitute in Retford F.C.'s 2-1 win over Clipstone F.C..

== Career statistics ==
As of matches played through 31st May 2026

Appearances and goals by club, season and competition
Club	Season	League			National Cup		League Cup		Other		Total	
Club	Season	Division	Apps	Goals	Apps	Goals	Apps	Goals	Apps	Goals	Apps	Goals
Sheffield United	2007–08	Championship	0	0	0	0	0	0	—		0	0
IFK Mariehamn (loan)	2008	Veikkausliiga	5	0	—		—		—		5	0
Chesterfield	2008–09	League Two	11	2	2	0	0	0	0	0	13	2
Chesterfield	2009–10	League Two	35	6	1	0	0	0	1 (Note: Appearance(s) in Football League Trophy)	0	37	6
Chesterfield	2010–11	League Two	23	3	1	1	0	0	1	0	25	4
Chesterfield	2011–12	League One	26	4	0	0	1	0	4	1	31	5
Chesterfield	2012–13	League Two	9	0	1	1	0	0	2	0	12	1
Chesterfield	Total		104	15	5	2	1	0	8	1	118	18
Macclesfield Town (loan)	2011–12	League Two	7	0	1	0	—		—		8	0
Alfreton Town (loan)	2012–13	Conference Premier	13	3	—		—		—		13	3
Macclesfield Town	2013–14	Conference Premier	40	18	5	4	—		1 (Note: Appearance(s) in FA Trophy)	0	46	22
FC Halifax Town	2014–15	Conference Premier	38	10	3	1	—		5	2	46	13
Newport County	2015–16	League Two	45	13	4	1	1	1	1	0	51	15
Inverness Caledonian Thistle	2016–17	Scottish Premiership	13	1	1	0	5	4	—		19	5
Wrexham	2017–18	National League	34	3	1	0	—		1	0	36	3
Gateshead	2018–19	National League	29	11	2	1	—		1	0	32	12
Chesterfield	2018–19	National League	15	10	—		—		—		15	10
Chesterfield	2019–20	National League	34	10	1	0	—		1	0	36	10
Chesterfield	2020–21	National League	9	3	1	0	—		1	0	11	3
Chesterfield	Total		58	23	2	0	—		2	0	62	23
Torquay United (loan)	2020–21	National League	18	6	0	0	—		0	0	18	6
Boreham Wood	2021–22	National League	44	11	6	2	—		2	0	52	13
York City	2022–23	National League	4	0	0	0	—		0	0	4	0
Buxton	2022–23	National League North	24	3	4	3	—		1	0	29	6
Buxton	2023–24	National League North	6	1	0	0	—		1	0	7	1
Buxton	Total		30	4	4	3	0	0	2	0	36	7
Matlock Town	2023–24	Northern Premier League Premier Division	16	3	—		—		0	0	16	3
Retford FC	2024–25	GCE Hire Fleet United Counties Football League Div 1	36	21	5	3	—		0	0	41	24
Retford FC	2025–26	GCE Hire Fleet United Counties Football League Div 1	28	6	1	1	2	1	2	0	33	8
Career total			562	148	40	18	9	6	23	3	636	175

== Honours ==
Chesterfield

- Football League Two: 2010–11
- Football League Trophy: 2011–12
