= Jack Lester =

English footballer & coach (born 1975)

Personal information
- Full name: Jack William Lester
- Date of birth: 8 October 1975 (age 51)
- Place of birth: Sheffield, England
- Height: 5 ft 10 in (1.78 m)
- Position: Striker

Team information
- Current team: Brentford (assistant first team coach)

Youth career
- 1992–1994: Grimsby Town

Senior career*
Years	Team	Apps	(Gls)
1994–2000	Grimsby Town	133	(17)
1996	→ Doncaster Rovers (loan)	11	(1)
2000–2003	Nottingham Forest	99	(21)
2003–2004	Sheffield United	44	(12)
2004–2007	Nottingham Forest	76	(12)
2007–2013	Chesterfield	197	(83)
2014	Gateshead	8	(2)
Total		568	(148)

Managerial career
- 2017–2018: Chesterfield
- * Club domestic league appearances and goals

Jack William Lester (born 8 October 1975) is an English football coach and former professional player, who is the assistant first team coach of Premier League club Brentford.

As a player Sheffield born Lester played as a forward from 1994 to 2014. He came through the youth ranks at Grimsby Town where he moved into the first team in 1994. He became a first team regular and was part of the squad that was victorious in the Football League Trophy and Football League Second Division play-offs during the 1997–98 season. He played at Blundell Park until midway through the 1999–2000 campaign when he was sold to Town's First Division relegation rivals Nottingham Forest. He spent three years as a first team regular for Forest before switching to Sheffield United in 2003. Lester returned to Forest after only spending a year with The Blades. Lester remained at the City Ground for another three seasons before joining Chesterfield in 2007. After six years at Chesterfield, Lester retired on 27 April 2013. On 3 February 2014, Lester came out of retirement and joined Gateshead on a non-contract basis. In his final ever appearance as a player he scored at Wembley Stadium in Gateshead's Football Conference play-off final defeat.

Following retirement Lester brief coached at youth level for Notts County before later returning to Forest where he held various coaching positions. In 2017 he returned to Chesterfield as first team manager but was unable to prevent them from being relegated from the Football League. He returned to Sheffield United in 2019 taking up a role as the head of their youth academy, before stepping up to first team coach during the 2021–22 season.

== Playing career ==
=== Grimsby Town ===
Lester started his career with Grimsby Town and signed his first professional contract in 1994. He was nurtured into a first team role at Grimsby by manager Alan Buckley and his assistant John Cockerill. After a brief loan spell with Doncaster Rovers in which he played 11 games (5 in the starting lineup) and scored one goal, Lester became a regular at Blundell Park. During his time there he formed notable strike partnerships with Clive Mendonca, Steve Livingstone, Lee Ashcroft and Jamie Forrester. It was during the 1997–1998 season that he had arguably his best season with Grimsby. He was a regular fixture in the first team and helped the club succeed in an impressive double final win at Wembley Stadium. The Mariners defeated AFC Bournemouth in the Football League Trophy (although Lester was suspended for the final) before beating Northampton Town in the Division Two play-off Final a few weeks later. Lester stayed with Grimsby until midway through the 1999–2000 season when he was controversially sold just after the turn of the millennium. He made 133 league appearances and scored 17 league goals in his time with The Mariners, and is still a popular figure at the club.

=== Nottingham Forest ===
David Platt signed Lester for Nottingham Forest in February 2000 for £300,000, just three weeks after he led the Grimsby attack beating Forest 4–3 in the League; it was from that game that Platt became interested in signing the player. It took some time for Lester to settle in at the City Ground but when Platt left the club, new manager Paul Hart moved him to an attacking midfield role where he flourished, making over 70 starts and scoring 24 goals. In 2003, he was released by Hart in an attempt to reduce debts.

=== Sheffield United ===
After an unsuccessful trial at Sheffield Wednesday, he was signed by Wednesday's bitter rivals Sheffield United at the start of the 2003–4 season. Lester played alongside Steve Kabba amongst others at Bramall Lane. He remained a first choice striker at the club for the entire season and made 50 appearances for United until his exit in November 2004.

=== Return to Forest ===
Lester was offered the chance to return to Forest and he was re-signed by Joe Kinnear in 2004 for £50,000. He scored in his first game but in his third start damaged knee ligaments which kept him out of action for almost 9 months. He went on to play 88 games in this second spell. Then after Nottingham Forest failed win promotion in the 2006–07 season, he was released by manager Colin Calderwood.

=== Chesterfield ===
In June 2007 he signed for Chesterfield on a 3-year contract. He finished the 2007–08 season as Chesterfield's top scorer, with 25 goals in all competitions. This tally made him 3rd top scorer in League Two, with 23 goals in the league, 6 behind Aaron McLean of Peterborough United. That season he also became the fastest post-war Chesterfield player to 20 goals in a season, getting his 20th (and 100th career goal) live on TV against Hereford United. He finished the season third in England on goal to game ratio, behind Cristiano Ronaldo and Fernando Torres. Lester scored his 100th League career goal in the 2–1 win over Exeter City on 28 January 2009. He also set a club record in becoming the first striker at the club to score 20 goals in consecutive seasons for 82 years. Despite scoring fewer goals than in his first season at Chesterfield, he finished the 2008–9 term as joint-top scorer for League Two, with 20 League goals.

In the 2010–11 season Lester scored 17 goals in 43 games (all in home games) as Chesterfield won Football League Two. Later going on to sign a new 2-year contract, keeping him at the club until June 2013. Lester suffered a broken arm against Leyton Orient in September 2011 which kept him out of the side for three months. Lacking both Jack and injured goalkeeper Tommy Lee, Chesterfield's results suffered and the team slumped to the foot of the division. Lester returned to the team in late December but was suspended and missed three further matches after the referee in the home game against Walsall watched recorded footage from the game and saw him strike an opponent. On 30 January 2012 Jack scored the late winning goal at Boundary Park against Oldham Athletic which ensured that Chesterfield reached the final of the Football League Trophy at Wembley, on a 3–1 aggregate score.

In his final season for Chesterfield, 2012–13, Lester played the majority of his games from the substitutes bench. He made only 11 starts despite figuring in 38 games in all competitions. Regardless of this his score rate is still impressive, having bagged 11 goals from just 1,454 minutes of football (the equivalent of just over 16 full games). Jack played his last game for Chesterfield, and his last game in professional football on 27 April 2013. He scored twice as The Spireites won 4–0 in a game that was a "fitting send off for a player who will forever be remembered by the Chesterfield faithful". His legendary status is regularly referred to by the club and fans and in August 2013, Chesterfield announced that the number worn by Lester throughout his time with the club, 14, would be retired in his honour.

=== Gateshead ===
On 3 February 2014, Lester came out of retirement, signing for Conference Premier side Gateshead on non-contract terms. He made his Gateshead debut on 25 February as a second-half substitute in a 2–0 defeat at Welling United. He made his first start and scored his first goal for Gateshead on 22 March 2014 in a 3–1 win against Lincoln City. He was part of the Gateshead side that pushed for promotion to the Football League and after defeating former side Grimsby Town in the play-off semi-final, Gateshead were eventually beaten in the final at Wembley Stadium by Cambridge United. Lester came on as a 69th-minute substitute and scored in the 80th minute but the club went on to lose 2–1. The game marked Lester's final appearance before retiring. At the end of the season in accordance with his decision to retire, Lester was released by Gateshead following the end of his contract.

== Coaching career ==
=== Notts County ===
After retiring in 2013 with Chesterfield, Lester and his family embarked on a year's travelling around Europe, but after his trip was cut short, and a potential coaching job in America fell through, he joined Notts County as an academy coach for the under 12s, while also returning to play semi-professionally for Gateshead.

=== Nottingham Forest ===
On 1 August 2014, Lester was appointed coach of the U18 side of former club Nottingham Forest. Upon his arrival, he stated towards the club's official website: "I saw it as an exciting prospect and the timing was perfect, It's been everything I hoped it would be. There are still quite a few people I know at Nottingham Forest and it's a wonderful club. I was delighted with the opportunity to work there again."

=== Chesterfield ===
Lester returned to Chesterfield after being appointed as the team's new manager on 29 September 2017. His first game in charge ended in a 2–0 loss to Cheltenham. Following a 4–1 loss to fellow strugglers Forest Green Rovers, which ended any realistic chance of Chesterfield avoiding relegation to the National League, Lester and Chesterfield mutually parted ways on 23 April 2018.

=== Sheffield United ===
On 19 July 2019, Lester returned to Sheffield United as the head of the club's youth academy.

In December 2021, Lester was promoted to first team coach by new manager Paul Heckingbottom. Lester extended his contract at Bramall Lane to the summer of 2028 along with Chris Wilder and his backroom team.

On 26 June 2025, Sheffield United announced he had left the club following the arrival of new coach Rubén Sellés.

=== Wales ===
On 4 September 2023, Lester was appointed as a temporary assistant coach for the Wales national football team under former teammate Rob Page. Page had been seeking a temporary assistant following the resignation of Eric Ramsay.

=== Brentford ===
On 9 September 2025, Lester was appointed assistant first team coach of Premier League club Brentford.

== Career statistics ==
Appearances and goals by club, season and competition
Club	Season	League^{[A]}			FA Cup		League Cup		Other^{[B]}		Total	
Club	Season	Division	Apps	Goals	Apps	Goals	Apps	Goals	Apps	Goals	Apps	Goals
Grimsby Town	1994–95	First Division	7	0	1	0	1	0	0	0	9	0
Grimsby Town	1995–96	First Division	5	0	0	0	1	0	0	0	6	0
Grimsby Town	1996–97	First Division	22	5	1	0	0	0	0	0	23	5
Grimsby Town	1997–98	Second Division	40	4	4	2	5	3	8	0	57	9
Grimsby Town	1998–99	First Division	33	4	1	0	5	0	0	0	39	4
Grimsby Town	1999–2000	First Division	26	4	2	0	5	3	0	0	33	7
Grimsby Town	Total		133	17	9	2	17	6	8	0	167	25
Doncaster Rovers (loan)	1996–97	Third Division	11	1	0	0	0	0	0	0	11	1
Nottingham Forest	1999–2000	First Division	15	2	0	0	0	0	0	0	15	2
Nottingham Forest	2000–01	First Division	19	7	0	0	0	0	0	0	19	7
Nottingham Forest	2001–02	First Division	32	5	1	0	2	1	0	0	35	6
Nottingham Forest	2002–03	First Division	33	7	0	0	1	2	1	0	35	9
Nottingham Forest	Total		99	21	1	0	3	3	1	0	104	24
Sheffield United	2003–04	First Division	32	12	2	1	2	2	0	0	36	15
Sheffield United	2004–05	Championship	12	0	0	0	2	1	0	0	14	1
Sheffield United	Total		44	12	2	1	4	3	0	0	50	16
Nottingham Forest	2004–05	Championship	3	1	0	0	0	0	0	0	3	1
Nottingham Forest	2005–06	League One	38	5	2^{[1]}	0	0	0	0	0	40	5
Nottingham Forest	2006–07	League One	35	6^{[2]}	4	0	1	0	5	1	45	7
Nottingham Forest	Total		76	12	6	0	1	0	5	1	88	13
Chesterfield	2007–08	League Two	36	25^{[3]}	1	1	1	1	0	0	38	27
Chesterfield	2008–09	League Two	37	20	3	2	1	0	1	1	42	23
Chesterfield	2009–10	League Two	29	11	1	1	0	0	3	0	33	12
Chesterfield	2010–11	League Two	40	17	1	0	1	0	1	0	43	17
Chesterfield	2011–12	League One	21	3	0	0	1	0	3	1	25	4
Chesterfield	2012–13	League Two	34	9	2	1	1	1	1	0	38	11
Chesterfield	Total		197	83	8	5	5	2	9	2	219	94
Gateshead	2013–14	Conference Premier	8	2	0	0	0	0	1	1	9	3
Career total			568	148	26	8	30	14	24	4	648	174

A. The "League" column constitutes appearances and goals (including those as a substitute) in The Football League and Football Conference.
B. The "Other" column constitutes appearances and goals (including those as a substitute) in the Football League Trophy, FA Trophy and play-offs.

1. One appearance missing from Soccerbase reference.
2. One goal from Soccerbase reference attributed to Grant Holt.
3. One goal from Soccerbase reference attributed to Adam Rooney. One goal from Soccerbase reference attributed to Peter Leven.

== Managerial statistics ==
As of 23 April 2018

Managerial record by team and tenure
Team	From	To	Record					Ref.
Team	From	To	P	W	D	L	Win %	Ref.
Chesterfield	29 September 2017	23 April 2018	37	9	7	21	24.3	
Total			37	9	7	21	24.3	

== Honours ==
Grimsby Town

- Football League Second Division play-offs: 1998

Chesterfield

- Football League Two: 2010–11
- Football League Trophy: 2011–12

Individual

- PFA Fans' Player of the Year: 2007–08 League Two
- PFA Team of the Year: 2007–08 Football League Two
- Football League Two top scorer: 2008–09
