= Phil Picken =

English footballer (born 1985)

Personal information
- Full name: Philip James Picken
- Date of birth: 12 November 1985 (age 40)
- Place of birth: Droylsden, England
- Height: 1.75 m (5 ft 9 in)
- Position: Defender

Youth career
- 2002–2004: Manchester United

Senior career*
Years	Team	Apps	(Gls)
2004–2006	Manchester United	0	(0)
2005–2006	→ Chesterfield (loan)	32	(1)
2006–2010	Chesterfield	108	(1)
2009	→ Notts County (loan)	22	(0)
2010–2014	Bury	77	(0)
Total		239	(2)
- * Club domestic league appearances and goals

Philip James Picken (born 12 November 1985) is an English former professional footballer who played as a defender and midfielder. In 10 years as a senior professional, he played for Manchester United, Chesterfield, Notts County and Bury.

Picken joined Manchester United as a junior and was a member of the club's reserve team that won the quadruple in 2005. He retired from football on 30 April 2014 after failing to recover from two serious knee injuries.

== Career ==
=== Manchester United ===
Born in Droylsden, England, Picken started his football career at Manchester United as a junior after being spotted playing in a small six-a-side tournament in Radcliffe. At first, he rejected joining Manchester United, due to having been a boyhood Manchester City supporter, but his mother persuaded him to do so.

Picken went on to spend ten years at the club's academy and was a member of the club's reserve team that won the quadruple in 2005. Shortly after, he signed his first professional contract with the club. After returning from a loan spell at Chesterfield, Picken was among four players to be released by the club at the end of the 2005–06 season.

=== Chesterfield ===
Picken played for Chesterfield on a loan basis from 18 August 2005 until the end of December.

Two days later, on 20 August 2005, Picken made his Chesterfield debut, where he made his first start for the club and played 90 minutes, in a 4–1 loss against Oldham Athletic. Subsequently, his loan spell with Chesterfield was extended until the end of the season despite playing nine matches. After extending his loan spell at Chesterfield, Picken then established himself in the first team and scored his first Chesterfield goal on 1 April 2006, in a 3–1 loss against Nottingham Forest. He later finished the 2005–06 season, making 32 appearances and scoring once.

On 25 May 2006, Picken later joined the club on a permanent basis, signing a two–year contract. His first game after signing for the club on a permanent basis came in the opening game of the season, where he made his first start, in a 3–0 win over AFC Bournemouth. He began playing from a left–back position to right–back position, as the season progressed, and then scored his first Chesterfield goal on 17 February 2007, in a 3–0 win over Port Vale. Despite suspension and injury, Picken made 39 appearances and scored once in his first full season at Chesterfield.

In the 2007–08 season saw Picken found himself competing over a right–back position with Jamie Lowry. However, during the season, Picken suffered an ankle injury and a hand injury that required operation. Despite the injuries, he made 37 appearances for Chesterfield in the 2007–08 season and was offered a new contract by the club. It was announced on 4 June 2008 that Picken had signed a contract with the club, keeping until 2010.

However, in the 2008–09 season, Picken soon fell out favour under manager Lee Richardson and was told by the manager to fight for the first team place. Picken was frozen out of the first team at the start of the season until being recalled to the first team against Gillingham on 6 December 2008.

When the January transfer window opened, Picken was consequently loaned out to Notts County on a one-month deal. He made his Notts County debut two days on 10 January 2009, where he made his first start and playing 90 minutes, in a 2–1 win over Exeter City. Three weeks later on 31 January 2009, Picken played against his parent club, Chesterfield, having been given permission to play against them, and lost 1–0. Shortly after, Picken's loan spell with Notts County was extended until the end of the season. He established himself in the first team at Notts County and went on to make 22 appearances for the club. At the end of the season, the club and Picken himself were keen for him to sign for the club on a permanent basis. However, Picken didn't sign on a permanent basis, as the club signed Brendan Moloney on loan instead.

However, the Spireites' manager was sacked at the end of the season, and new manager John Sheridan gave the whole squad a clean slate. Picken soon became the first choice right back at Saltergate again. However, Picken suffered injuries again throughout the 2009–10 season. Despite this, he went on to make 21 appearances for the club.

At the end of the 2009–10 season, Picken was released by the club.

=== Bury ===
After leaving the club, Picken went on trial at Bury. After impressing at the trial, he signed for on a free transfer on 4 August 2010, signing a one–year contract.

Picken made his Bury debut, making his first start and playing 90 minutes, in a 1–0 loss against Port Vale in the opening game of the season on 7 August 2010. Three weeks later on 28 August 2010, he then provided an assist for Ryan Lowe to score Bury's only goal in the game, in a 1–1 draw against Barnet. Though he became a first-team regular at Bury, making 38 appearances for the club, Picken suffered suspension and injuries, including a hamstring injury that kept him out for the rest of the season. Despite this, Picken achieved promotion from League 2 with Bury as runners up in the league in May 2011. At the end of the 2010–11 season, Picken's contract with Bury was extended for another year.

The 2011–12 season saw Picken returning to the first team from injury and making his first appearance for the club since April, in a 1–1 draw against Huddersfield Town in the opening game of the season on 6 August 2011. He managed to regain his first team place and was awarded a contract, which would keep him until 2014. Picken continued to do so, as the season progressed until being dropped from the first team in mid-March, due to a mistake against Carlisle United that saw Bury lost 4–1. Despite this, Picken made 37 appearances for the club in the 2011–12 season.

In the 2012–13 season, Picken suffered a knee injury in a game against Preston North End in September 2012 and was subsequently ruled out for the rest of the season, with Bury suffering relegation in his absence. On 28 May 2013 it was announced that Picken would miss the entire 2013–14 season following further setbacks with his injury. Because of this, he was not allocated a squad number ahead of the 2013–14 season. After failing to recover from his injury, Picken announced his retirement from professional football in May 2014.
