= Ben Algar =

English footballer

Personal information
- Full name: Benjamin Christopher Algar
- Date of birth: 3 December 1989 (age 36)
- Place of birth: Dronfield, England
- Positions: Striker; full-back

Team information
- Current team: Frickley Athletic

Youth career
- Sheffield United
- Chesterfield

Senior career*
Years	Team	Apps	(Gls)
2007–2009	Chesterfield	15	(0)
2009–2011	Matlock Town	29	(5)
2011	F.C. New York	35	(4)
2012–	Matlock Town	37	
2017–	Frickley Athletic	55	
- * Club domestic league appearances and goals as of 7 September 2018

Benjamin Christopher Algar (born 3 December 1989) is an English footballer who plays as a left back for Frickley Athletic.

== Career ==
=== England ===
Algar started his career as a winger or striker and came through the youth systems of Sheffield United and Chesterfield. He made his professional debut for the Spireites on 4 September 2007, coming on as a substitute in the 55th minute of a 3–1 defeat at home to Hartlepool United in the Football League Trophy. He made 15 league appearances for Chesterfield in the 2008–09 season, but was told that he would not be offered a new deal by the club, and was released on 7 May 2009.

In the summer of 2009 Algar had short periods at League Two club Burton Albion and Conference National club Mansfield Town. Eventually, he signed a contract with Matlock Town of the Northern Premier League Premier Division. He made 29 appearances and scored 3 goals for Matlock under head coach Mark Atkins.

folding.

=== United States ===
2011 Algar played for FC New York making 30 appearances and scoring 5 goals, starting in 2011 in the National Division of the USL Professional Division, the third tier of the American Soccer Pyramid and then moving to the National Premier Soccer League for 2012. The club did not finish its 2012 due to folding.

Algar moved to the United States when he signed for USL Professional Division expansion team FC New York. The deal was facilitated via FC New York's relationship with English club Sheffield United.
