= Darren Currie =

English footballer (born 1974)

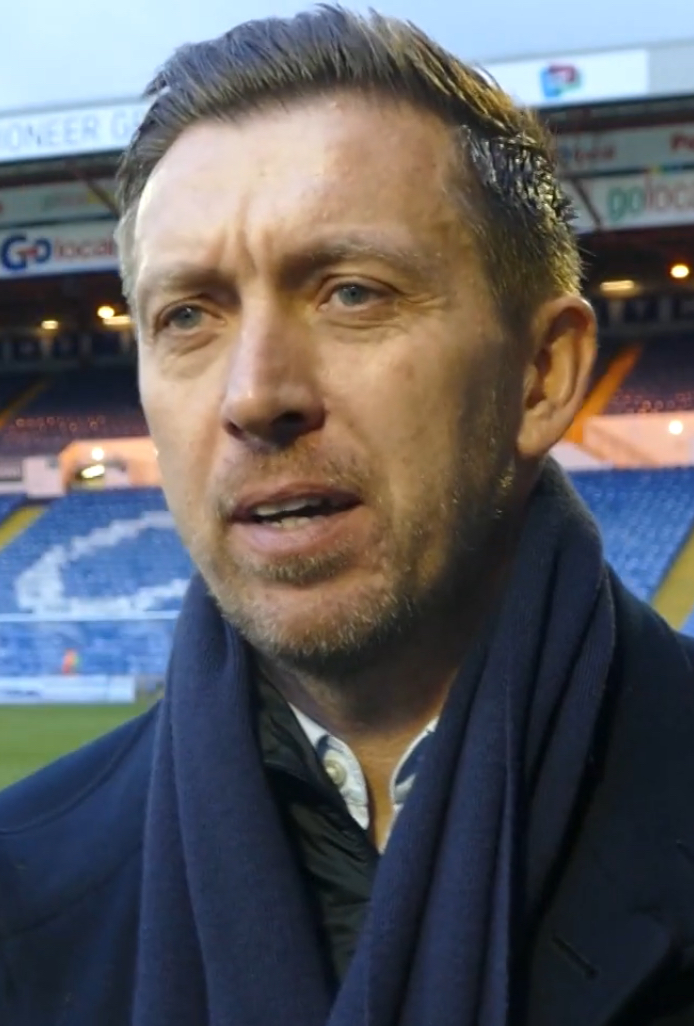
- Currie in 2020

Personal information
- Full name: Darren Paul Currie
- Date of birth: 29 November 1974 (age 51)
- Place of birth: Hampstead, England
- Height: 5 ft 11 in (1.80 m)
- Position: Midfielder

Team information
- Current team: Southend United (Assistant head coach)

Youth career
- ?–1993: West Ham United

Senior career*
Years	Team	Apps	(Gls)
1993–1996	West Ham United	0	(0)
1994–1995	→ Shrewsbury Town (loan)	17	(2)
1995	→ Leyton Orient (loan)	10	(0)
1996–1998	Shrewsbury Town	66	(8)
1998	Plymouth Argyle	7	(0)
1998–2001	Barnet	127	(19)
2001–2004	Wycombe Wanderers	126	(14)
2004	Brighton & Hove Albion	22	(2)
2004–2007	Ipswich Town	83	(9)
2006–2007	→ Coventry City (loan)	8	(0)
2007	→ Derby County (loan)	7	(1)
2007–2008	Luton Town	31	(2)
2008–2010	Chesterfield	31	(3)
2009–2010	→ Dagenham & Redbridge (loan)	5	(0)
2010–2011	Dagenham & Redbridge	33	(1)
2011	Boreham Wood	5	(2)
2011–2012	Hendon	36	(2)
2012–2013	Dagenham & Redbridge	0	(0)
Total		614	(65)

Managerial career
- 2015: Dagenham & Redbridge (caretaker)
- 2018–2020: Barnet
- * Club domestic league appearances and goals

Darren Paul Currie (born 29 November 1974) is an English former footballer who made over 600 appearances in The Football League. He was most recently assistant head coach at Southend United.

== Playing career ==
Currie, who is the nephew of former Sheffield United, Leeds United and England footballer Tony Currie, began his career as a trainee at West Ham United in 1993 but did not play for the first team. He had a loan spell at Leyton Orient before joining Shrewsbury Town in February 1996 for a transfer fee of £70,000, for whom he made over 70 league and cup appearances in two seasons.

He was released by Shrewsbury in March 1998 and joined Plymouth Argyle until the end of the 1997–98 season. He then joined Barnet in summer 1998 and made over 140 league and cup appearances in three seasons. He was selected in the PFA Team of the Season for Division Three for two consecutive seasons but after Barnet were relegated to the Nationwide Conference at the end of the 2000–01 season, he left Barnet and joined Wycombe Wanderers for a transfer fee of £200,000. He left Wycombe by mutual consent at the end of the 2003–04 season after the club was relegated, having made over 140 appearances for the club.

Currie impressed Brighton manager Mark McGhee during pre-season trials in 2004 and was given a one-year contract, with McGee saying, "Darren has skills comparable with any player at this level." A few months later in December 2004, Currie joined Ipswich Town for a transfer fee of £250,000, which Brighton's financial position meant they could not turn down.

Currie made his debut for Ipswich in December 2004, scoring a goal and making another, as Ipswich beat Queens Park Rangers 4–2 away from home. He made 26 appearances for Ipswich in the 2004–05 season, as Ipswich reached the Football League Championship play-offs in May 2005.

Currie fell out of favour in the 2006–07 season, starting only six games before joining Coventry City on loan in November 2006 when Ipswich manager Jim Magilton could not guarantee him a place in the first-team. Currie had a two-week trial with the Major League Soccer club Los Angeles Galaxy early in 2007, for whom he made three substitute appearance, but was not offered a contract and returned to Ipswich.

He joined Derby County in March 2007 on a loan until the end of the season, which was extended until the end of May 2007 so he would be eligible for the 2006–07 season Football League Championship play-offs. He came on as a substitute in the second leg of the semi-final against Southampton as his side won on penalties, but he did not feature in the final. Currie scored once during his spell at Derby, his goal coming on a 2–0 win over Leeds United on 6 May 2007.

Currie joined Luton Town on a free transfer from Ipswich in July 2007, signing a two-year contract, and scored on his debut against Hartlepool United in August 2007. He made 38 league and cup appearances in the 2007–08 season as Luton went into administration, suffered a ten-point penalty and were relegated.

Following Luton's relegation to League Two, Currie was one of several players to be offered a free transfer in May 2008, but declared that he would not leave the club until his demands were met. After negotiating terms with Brighton & Hove Albion, Currie turned them down and signed a three-year contract with League Two side Chesterfield.

On 23 November 2009, Currie joined League Two side Dagenham & Redbridge on a month's loan, making his debut on 24 November in a 0–0 away draw against AFC Bournemouth. He signed an 18-month contract with Dagenham on 19 January 2010. He made 16 appearances for the club in the 2010–11 season as they won promotion to League One. The next season, Currie made a further 22 league appearances, scoring once, as Dagenham were relegated straight back to League Two. He left the club in May 2011.

Currie went on trial with League Two side Southend United in July 2011, though was not offered a contract.

On 5 August 2011, Currie joined Conference South side Boreham Wood as both a player and the club's assistant manager.

On 11 November 2011, Currie joined Isthmian League Premier Division side Hendon in a playing capacity.

In October 2012, Currie rejoined Dagenham & Redbridge as a development coach. He also registered as a player, taking squad number 29 and appearing on the substitutes bench in a 3–2 loss at York City on 20 October 2012. He appeared again on the bench for the 1–1 draw with Exeter City on 23 October 2012. Currie was promoted to assistant manager in February 2013, replacing Wayne Burnett who was promoted to manager following the departure of John Still to Luton Town. In December 2015, Currie and Warren Hackett became caretaker managers after Burnett was sacked. After two games in charge, Currie returned to his role as assistant after the return of Still.

== Managerial career ==
=== Barnet ===
In June 2018, Currie returned to Barnet as assistant manager, once again as assistant to Still. Following Still's retirement on 28 December 2018, Currie took over as caretaker manager of the Bees. He was made permanent manager at Barnet on 23 January 2019. Currie's reign as Barnet manager got off to a good start following a 1–0 win away at Dagenham & Redbridge, a 1–1 draw at home to Boreham Wood and then beating Championship leaders Sheffield United in the FA Cup at Bramall Lane. They also took Brentford to a replay in the next round of the cup after a 3–3 draw at The Hive. Currie then led Barnet to the National League play-offs in his first full season in management, beating Yeovil Town 2–0 in the quarter-finals before losing by the same scoreline to Notts County in the semi-finals. On 12 August 2020, Currie and his assistant Junior Lewis left Barnet after failing to agree a new contract.

=== Sheffield United ===
Currie was appointed joint manager of the Sheffield United U23 team, along with Graham Coughlan, on 22 March 2021.

=== Southend United ===
On 20 October 2021, Currie joined National League side Southend United in the role of Assistant Head Coach to Kevin Maher. On 19 May 2026, Currie, along with Maher and fellow assistant Mark Bentley, was sacked following a review of the 2025–26 season.

== Playing statistics ==
Appearances and goals by club, season and competition
Club	Season	League			FA Cup		League Cup		Other		Total	
Club	Season	Division	Apps	Goals	Apps	Goals	Apps	Goals	Apps	Goals	Apps	Goals
West Ham United	1993–94	Premier League	0	0	0	0	0	0	—		0	0
West Ham United	1994–95	Premier League	0	0	0	0	0	0	—		0	0
West Ham United	1995–96	Premier League	0	0	0	0	0	0	—		0	0
West Ham United	Total		0	0	0	0	0	0	—		0	0
Shrewsbury Town (loan)	1994–95	Second Division	17	2	0	0	0	0	0	0	17	2
Leyton Orient (loan)	1995–96	Third Division	10	0	0	0	0	0	0	0	10	0
Shrewsbury Town	1995–96	Second Division	13	2	0	0	0	0	0	0	13	2
Shrewsbury Town	1996–97	Second Division	37	2	2	0	2	0	0	0	41	2
Shrewsbury Town	1997–98	Third Division	16	4	1	0	1	1	0	0	18	5
Shrewsbury Town	Total		66	8	3	0	3	1	0	0	72	9
Plymouth Argyle	1997–98	Second Division	7	0	0	0	0	0	0	0	7	0
Barnet	1998–99	Third Division	38	4	1	1	2	1	1 (Note: Appearance(s) in Football League Trophy)	0	42	6
Barnet	1999–2000	Third Division	44	5	0	0	1	0	4 (Note: One appearance in Football League Trophy; two appearances in Football League Third Division play-offs)	0	49	5
Barnet	2000–01	Third Division	45	10	2	1	2	0	1	0	50	11
Barnet	Total		127	19	3	2	5	1	6	0	141	22
Wycombe Wanderers	2001–02	Second Division	46	3	4	3	1	0	0	0	51	6
Wycombe Wanderers	2002–03	Second Division	38	4	1	0	2	0	2	0	43	4
Wycombe Wanderers	2003–04	Second Division	42	7	2	2	2	0	3	0	49	9
Wycombe Wanderers	Total		126	14	7	5	5	0	5	0	143	19
Brighton & Hove Albion	2004–05	Championship	22	2	0	0	1	0	—		23	2
Ipswich Town	2004–05	Championship	24	3	1	0	0	0	2 (Note: Appearance(s) in Football League Championship play-offs)	0	27	3
Ipswich Town	2005–06	Championship	46	5	1	0	1	0	—		48	5
Ipswich Town	2006–07	Championship	13	1	0	0	1	0	—		14	1
Ipswich Town	Total		83	9	2	0	2	0	2	0	89	9
Coventry City (loan)	2006–07	Championship	8	0	0	0	0	0	—		8	0
Derby County (loan)	2006–07	Championship	7	1	0	0	0	0	1	0	8	1
Luton Town	2007–08	League One	31	2	5	0	2	0	0	0	38	2
Chesterfield	2008–09	League Two	27	3	3	0	1	0	1	0	32	3
Chesterfield	2009–10	League Two	4	0	0	0	1	1	1	1	6	2
Chesterfield	Total		31	3	3	0	2	1	2	1	38	5
Dagenham & Redbridge	2009–10	League Two	16	0	0	0	0	0	0	0	16	0
Dagenham & Redbridge	2010–11	League One	22	1	1	0	1	0	1	0	25	1
Dagenham & Redbridge	Total		38	1	1	0	1	0	1	0	41	1
Boreham Wood	2011–12	Conference South	5	2	1	0	—		0	0	6	2
Hendon	2011–12	Isthmian Premier Division	27	1	0	0	—		4 (Note: Two appearances in Middlesex Senior Cup; two appearances, one goal in London Senior Cup)	1	31	2
Hendon	2012–13	Isthmian Premier Division	9	1	1	0	—		0	0	10	1
Hendon	Total		36	2	1	0	—		4	1	41	3
Dagenham & Redbridge	2012–13	League Two	0	0	0	0	0	0	0	0	0	0
Career total			614	65	26	7	21	3	21	2	682	77

== Managerial statistics ==
As of match played 25 July 2020

Managerial record by team and tenure
Team	From	To	Record					Ref.
Team	From	To	P	W	D	L	Win %	Ref.
Dagenham & Redbridge (caretaker)	21 December 2015	31 December 2015	2	1	0	1	50.00	
Barnet	28 December 2018	12 August 2020	75	29	25	21	38.67	
Total			77	30	25	22	38.96	

== Honours ==
Dagenham & Redbridge

- Football League Two play-offs: 2010

Hendon

- London Senior Cup: 2011–12

Individual

- PFA Team of the Year: 1999–2000 Third Division, 2000–01 Third Division
