= 2010–11 Football League Two =

Football League Two
- Season: 2010–11
- Champions: Chesterfield (3rd divisional title)
- Promoted: Chesterfield; Bury; Wycombe Wanderers; Stevenage
- Relegated: Stockport County; Lincoln City
- Matches: 552
- Goals: 1,509 (2.73 per match)
- Top goalscorer: Clayton Donaldson (28)
- Biggest home win: Crewe Alexandra 7–0 Barnet (21 August 2010); Crewe Alexandra 8–1 Cheltenham Town (2 April 2011)
- Biggest away win: Lincoln City 0–6 Rotherham United (25 March 2011)
- Highest scoring: Accrington Stanley 7–4 Gillingham (2 October 2010)
- Longest winning run: 6 games Bury; Stevenage
- Longest unbeaten run: 16 games Gillingham
- Longest winless run: 18 games Northampton Town
- Longest losing run: 5 games Lincoln City; Northampton Town
- Highest attendance: 15,332; Bradford City 3–2 Stockport County (26 February 2011)
- Lowest attendance: 1,067; Macclesfield Town 1–1 Lincoln City (15 March 2011)
- Average attendance: 4,166

The 2010–11 Football League Two season, (known as the Npower League Two for sponsorship reasons), was the lowest division of the Football League for that season. It began on 7 August 2010 and concluded on 28 May 2011 with the play-off final.

== Changes from last season ==
=== Team changes ===
==== From League Two ====
Promoted to League One

- Notts County
- Rochdale
- Bournemouth
- Dagenham and Redbridge

Relegated to Conference National

- Grimsby Town
- Darlington

==== To League Two ====
Relegated from Football League One

- Wycombe Wanderers
- Southend United
- Stockport County
- Gillingham

Promoted from Conference National

- Stevenage
- Oxford United

== Team overview ==
=== Stadia and locations ===
Locations of League Two 2010–11 teams

Team	Location	Stadium	Capacity
Accrington Stanley	Accrington	Crown Ground	5,057
Aldershot Town	Aldershot	Recreation Ground	7,500
Barnet	London	Underhill Stadium	6,200
Bradford City	Bradford	Valley Parade	25,136
Burton Albion	Burton upon Trent	Pirelli Stadium	6,912
Bury	Bury	Gigg Lane	11,840
Cheltenham Town	Cheltenham	Abbey Business Stadium	7,066
Chesterfield	Chesterfield	B2net Stadium	10,338
Crewe Alexandra	Crewe	Alexandra Stadium	10,153
Gillingham	Gillingham	Priestfield Stadium	11,582
Hereford United	Hereford	Edgar Street	5,075
Lincoln City	Lincoln	Sincil Bank	10,500
Macclesfield Town	Macclesfield	Moss Rose	6,355
Morecambe	Morecambe	Globe Arena	6,918
Northampton Town	Northampton	Sixfields Stadium	7,653
Oxford United	Oxford	Kassam Stadium	12,500
Port Vale	Stoke-on-Trent	Vale Park	19,052
Rotherham United	Sheffield	Don Valley Stadium	25,000
Shrewsbury Town	Shrewsbury	Greenhous Meadow	9,875
Southend United	Southend-on-Sea	Roots Hall	12,392
Stevenage	Stevenage	Broadhall Way	7,100
Stockport County	Stockport	Edgeley Park	10,852
Torquay United	Torquay	Plainmoor	6,104
Wycombe Wanderers	High Wycombe	Adams Park	10,284

=== Personnel and sponsoring ===
Team	Manager	Chairman	Team captain	Kit maker	Sponsor
Accrington Stanley	John Coleman	Ilyas Khan	Andrew Procter	Joma	Combined Stabilisation
Aldershot Town	Dean Holdsworth	John Leppard	Anthony Charles	Carbrini	EBB Paper
Barnet	Giuliano Grazioli(caretaker)	Anthony Kleanthous	Glen Southam	Vandanel	Home-Pulse Fitness, Away-Greenfleets
Bradford City	Peter Jackson	Mark Lawn and Julian Rhodes	Simon Ramsden	Surridge	Map Group UK
Burton Albion	Paul Peschisolido	Ben Robinson	John McGrath	TAG	Mr Cropper
Bury	Richard Barker (caretaker)	Brian Fenton	Steven Schumacher	Surridge	Bury Metropolitan Council
Cheltenham Town	Mark Yates	Paul Baker	Michael Pook	Erreà	Mira Showers
Chesterfield	John Sheridan	Barrie Hubbard	Mark Allott	Respect	Vodka Kick
Crewe Alexandra	Dario Gradi	John Bowler	David Artell	Lotto	Mornflake Cereal
Gillingham	Andy Hessenthaler	Paul Scally	Barry Fuller	Vandanel	Automatic Retailing
Hereford United	Jamie Pitman	David Keyte	Michael Townsend	Admiral	Cargill
Lincoln City	Steve Tilson	Bob Dorrian	Delroy Facey	Umbro	Star Glaze
Macclesfield Town	Gary Simpson	Mike Rance	Paul Morgan	adidas	Voi Jeans
Morecambe	Sammy McIlroy	Peter McGuigan	Barry Roche	Puma	Bench
Northampton Town	Gary Johnson	David Cardoza	Andy Holt	Erreà	Jackson Grundy
Oxford United	Chris Wilder	Kelvin Thomas	James Constable	Nike	Bridle Insurance
Port Vale	Micky Adams	Bill Bratt	Marc Richards	Vandanel	Harlequin Property
Rotherham United	Andy Scott	Tony Stewart	Ryan Cresswell	Carlotti	Parkgate Shopping
Shrewsbury Town	Graham Turner	Roland Wycherley	Ian Sharps	Joma	Greenhous
Southend United	Paul Sturrock	Ron Martin	Craig Easton	Nike	InsureandGo
Stevenage	Graham Westley	Phil Wallace	Mark Roberts	Vandanel	Serverchoice and LCN
Stockport County	Ray Mathias	Alwin Thompson	Danny Swailes	Nike	Stockport council
Torquay United	Paul Buckle	Simon Baker	Lee Mansell	Vandanel	Sparkworld
Wycombe Wanderers	Gary Waddock	Ivor Beeks	Gareth Ainsworth	Joma	Bucks New University

==== Managerial changes ====
Team	Outgoing manager	Manner of departure	Date of vacancy	Incoming manager	Date of appointment	Position in Table
Hereford United	Graham Turner	Resigned	16 April 2010	Simon Davey	22 June 2010	Pre-Season
Barnet	Ian Hendon	Sacked	28 April 2010	Mark Stimson	1 June 2010	Pre-Season
Shrewsbury Town	Paul Simpson	Sacked	30 April 2010	Graham Turner	11 June 2010	Pre-Season
Gillingham	Mark Stimson	Mutual consent	10 May 2010	Andy Hessenthaler	22 May 2010	Pre-Season
Stockport	Gary Ablett	Sacked	17 June 2010	Paul Simpson	12 July 2010	Pre-Season
Lincoln City	Chris Sutton	Resigned	29 September 2010	Steve Tilson	15 October 2010	21st
Hereford United	Simon Davey	Sacked	4 October 2010	Jamie Pitman	19 December 2010	24th
Port Vale	Micky Adams	Signed by Sheffield United	30 December 2010	Jim Gannon	6 January 2011	2nd
Barnet	Mark Stimson	Sacked	1 January 2011	Martin Allen	23 March 2011	23rd
Stockport County	Paul Simpson	Sacked	4 January 2011	Ray Mathias	9 March 2011	21st
Aldershot Town	Kevin Dillon	Sacked	10 January 2011	Dean Holdsworth	12 January 2011	20th
Bradford City	Peter Taylor	Stepped down	26 February 2011	Peter Jackson	28 February 2011	20th
Northampton Town	Ian Sampson	Sacked	2 March 2011	Gary Johnson	4 March 2011	16th
Port Vale	Jim Gannon	Sacked	21 March 2011	Micky Adams	13 May 2011	8th
Rotherham United	Ronnie Moore	Mutual consent	22 March 2011	Andy Scott	13 April 2011	9th
Bury	Alan Knill	Signed by Scunthorpe United	31 March 2011	Richard Barker (caretaker)	31 March 2011	9th
Barnet	Martin Allen	Signed by Notts County	11 April 2011	Giuliano Grazioli (caretaker)	11 April 2011	23rd

== League table ==
A total of 24 teams contest the division: 18 sides remaining in the division from last season, four relegated from the League One, and two promoted from Conference National.

Pos	Team	Pld	W	D	L	GF	GA	GD	Pts	Promotion, qualification or relegation
1	Chesterfield (C, P)	46	24	14	8	85	51	+34	86	Promotion to League One
2	Bury (P)	46	23	12	11	82	50	+32	81	Promotion to League One
3	Wycombe Wanderers (P)	46	22	14	10	69	50	+19	80	Promotion to League One
4	Shrewsbury Town	46	22	13	11	72	49	+23	79	Qualification to League Two play-offs
5	Accrington Stanley	46	18	19	9	73	55	+18	73	Qualification to League Two play-offs
6	Stevenage (O, P)	46	18	15	13	62	45	+17	69	Qualification to League Two play-offs
7	Torquay United	46	17	18	11	74	53	+21	68 (Note: Torquay United deducted one point and Hereford United deducted three points)	Qualification to League Two play-offs
8	Gillingham	46	17	17	12	67	57	+10	68	
9	Rotherham United	46	17	15	14	75	60	+15	66	
10	Crewe Alexandra	46	18	11	17	87	65	+22	65	
11	Port Vale	46	17	14	15	54	49	+5	65	
12	Oxford United	46	17	12	17	58	60	−2	63	
13	Southend United	46	16	13	17	62	56	+6	61	
14	Aldershot Town	46	14	19	13	54	54	0	61	
15	Macclesfield Town	46	14	13	19	59	73	−14	55	
16	Northampton Town	46	11	19	16	63	71	−8	52	
17	Cheltenham Town	46	13	13	20	56	77	−21	52	
18	Bradford City	46	15	7	24	43	68	−25	52	
19	Burton Albion	46	12	15	19	56	70	−14	51	
20	Morecambe	46	13	12	21	54	73	−19	51	
21	Hereford United	46	12	17	17	50	66	−16	50	
22	Barnet	46	12	12	22	58	77	−19	48	
23	Lincoln City (R)	46	13	8	25	45	81	−36	47	Relegation to Conference National
24	Stockport County (R)	46	9	14	23	48	96	−48	41	Relegation to Conference National

Updated to match(es) played on 28 May 2011. Source: The Football League
Rules for classification: 1) points; 2) goal difference; 3) number of goals scored.
(C) Champions; (O) Play-off winners; (P) Promoted; (R) Relegated

== Play-offs ==
Semifinals
4	Shrewsbury Town	0	0	0
7	Torquay United	2	0	2
5	Accrington Stanley	0	0	0
6	Stevenage	2	1	3

Final
6	Stevenage	1
7	Torquay United	0

=== Semifinals ===
14 May 2011
17:45

Torquay United	2–0	Shrewsbury Town
Zebroski 29'; O'Kane 45+3'	Report

Plainmoor, Torquay
Attendance: 4,130
Referee: Scott Mathieson
20 May 2011
19:45

Shrewsbury Town	0–0	Torquay United
	Report

Greenhous Meadow, Shrewsbury
Attendance: 8,452
Referee: Kevin Wright

Torquay United won 2 – 0 on aggregate.

15 May 2011
18:30

Stevenage	2–0	Accrington Stanley
Long 24'; Byrom 45'	Report

Lamex Stadium, Stevenage
Attendance: 4,424
Referee: Roger East
20 May 2011
19:45

Accrington Stanley	0–1	Stevenage
	Report	Beardsley 90'

Crown Ground, Accrington
Attendance: 4,185
Referee: Russell Booth

Stevenage won 3 – 0 on aggregate.

=== Final ===
28 May 2011
15:15

Stevenage	1–0	Torquay United
Mousinho 41'	Report

Old Trafford, Manchester
Attendance: 11,484
Referee: Darren Deadman (Cambridgeshire)

== Results ==
Home \ Away	ACC	ALD	BAR	BRA	BRT	BRY	CHL	CHF	CRE	GIL	HER	LIN	MAC	MOR	NOR	OXF	PTV	ROT	SHR	STD	STE	STP	TOR	WYC
Accrington Stanley		0–0	3–1	3–0	3–1	1–0	2–4	2–2	3–2	7–4	4–0	3–0	3–0	1–1	3–1	0–0	3–0	2–3	1–3	3–1	1–0	3–0	1–0	1–1
Aldershot Town	1–1		1–0	1–0	1–2	1–3	0–2	0–2	3–2	1–1	1–2	2–2	0–0	2–1	1–1	1–2	1–2	2–2	3–0	1–0	1–1	1–0	1–0	0–0
Barnet	2–0	1–2		0–2	0–0	1–1	3–1	2–2	2–1	1–2	2–0	4–2	1–0	1–2	4–1	2–2	1–0	1–4	1–1	0–2	0–3	1–3	0–3	0–1
Bradford City	1–1	2–1	1–3		1–1	1–0	3–1	0–1	1–5	1–0	1–0	1–2	0–1	0–1	1–1	5–0	0–2	2–1	1–2	0–2	1–0	3–2	0–3	1–0
Burton Albion	1–1	1–2	1–4	3–0		1–3	2–0	1–0	1–1	1–1	3–0	3–1	3–2	3–2	1–1	0–0	0–0	2–4	0–0	3–1	0–2	2–1	3–3	1–2
Bury	3–0	1–1	2–0	0–1	1–0		2–3	1–1	3–1	5–4	1–1	1–0	2–2	1–0	1–1	3–0	0–1	1–1	1–0	1–0	3–0	0–1	1–2	1–3
Cheltenham Town	1–2	1–2	1–1	4–0	2–1	0–2		0–3	3–2	1–2	0–3	1–2	0–1	1–1	1–0	1–1	0–0	1–1	0–1	0–2	1–0	2–1	2–2	1–2
Chesterfield	5–2	2–2	2–1	2–2	1–2	2–3	3–0		5–5	3–1	4–0	2–1	2–1	0–2	2–1	1–2	2–0	5–0	4–3	2–1	1–0	4–1	1–0	4–1
Crewe Alexandra	0–0	3–1	7–0	2–1	4–1	3–0	8–1	2–0		1–1	0–1	1–1	1–1	2–1	2–0	1–1	2–1	0–1	1–2	1–0	0–1	2–0	3–3	3–0
Gillingham	3–1	2–1	2–4	2–0	1–0	1–1	1–1	0–2	1–3		0–0	0–1	2–4	1–1	1–0	0–0	3–0	3–1	2–0	0–0	1–0	2–1	1–1	0–2
Hereford United	1–1	2–2	1–2	1–1	0–0	0–3	1–1	3–0	1–0	0–0		0–1	2–2	2–1	1–1	0–2	1–1	0–1	0–2	1–3	1–4	3–0	2–2	0–0
Lincoln City	0–0	0–3	1–0	1–2	0–0	0–5	0–2	0–2	1–1	0–4	3–1		2–1	2–0	0–2	3–1	1–0	0–6	1–5	2–1	0–1	0–0	0–2	1–2
Macclesfield Town	2–2	2–0	1–1	0–1	2–1	2–4	0–2	1–1	1–0	2–4	1–1	1–1		2–0	2–0	3–2	0–3	0–2	0–1	0–0	0–4	0–2	3–3	0–1
Morecambe	1–2	1–1	2–2	0–1	2–1	1–4	1–1	1–1	1–2	1–1	1–1	1–2	1–2		1–2	0–3	1–0	0–0	1–0	2–1	0–0	5–0	2–1	0–3
Northampton Town	0–0	1–1	0–0	2–0	2–3	2–4	1–1	1–2	6–2	2–1	3–4	2–1	0–1	3–3		2–1	0–0	2–2	2–3	2–1	2–0	2–0	2–2	1–1
Oxford United	0–0	0–1	2–1	2–1	3–0	1–2	1–1	0–0	2–1	0–1	0–2	2–1	2–1	4–0	3–1		2–1	2–1	3–1	0–2	1–2	0–1	0–2	2–2
Port Vale	2–0	1–0	0–0	2–1	2–1	0–0	0–1	1–1	2–1	0–0	1–1	2–1	2–1	7–2	1–1	1–2		1–0	1–0	1–1	1–3	1–2	1–2	2–1
Rotherham United	2–0	1–0	0–0	0–0	3–3	0–0	6–4	1–0	3–1	0–1	0–0	2–1	1–1	0–1	2–2	2–1	5–0		1–3	1–2	1–1	4–0	3–1	3–4
Shrewsbury Town	0–0	1–1	2–1	3–1	3–0	0–3	1–1	0–0	0–1	0–0	4–0	2–0	4–1	1–3	3–1	3–0	2–2	1–0		1–1	1–0	2–0	1–1	1–1
Southend United	1–1	0–0	2–1	4–0	1–1	1–1	1–2	2–3	0–2	2–2	4–0	1–0	4–1	2–3	1–1	2–1	1–3	1–0	0–2		1–0	1–1	2–1	3–2
Stevenage	2–2	2–2	4–2	2–1	2–1	3–3	4–0	0–0	1–1	2–2	0–1	2–1	2–2	2–0	0–1	0–0	1–0	3–0	1–1	1–1		3–1	0–0	0–2
Stockport County	2–2	2–2	2–1	1–1	0–0	2–1	1–1	1–1	3–3	1–5	0–5	3–4	1–4	0–2	2–2	2–1	0–5	3–3	0–4	2–1	2–2		1–1	0–0
Torquay United	0–0	0–1	1–1	2–0	1–0	3–4	2–1	0–0	2–1	1–1	1–3	2–0	1–3	3–1	3–0	3–4	0–0	1–1	5–0	1–1	2–0	2–0		0–0
Wycombe Wanderers	1–2	2–2	4–2	1–0	4–1	1–0	2–1	1–2	2–0	1–0	2–1	2–2	1–2	2–0	2–2	0–0	1–1	1–0	2–2	3–1	0–1	2–0	1–3	

Updated to match(es) played on 7 May 2011. Source: The Football League
Legend: Blue = home team win; Yellow = draw; Red = away team win.

== Season statistics ==
=== Top scorers ===
Rank	Scorer	Club	Goals
1	(Jamaica) Clayton Donaldson	Crewe Alexandra	28
2	(England) Ryan Lowe	Bury	27
3	(England) Cody McDonald	Gillingham	25
4	(Wales) Craig Davies	Chesterfield	23
4	(England) Adam Le Fondre	Rotherham United	23
6	(Republic of Ireland) Barry Corr	Southend United	18
6	(England) Jack Lester	Chesterfield	18
6	(England) Shaun Miller	Crewe Alexandra	18
6	(England) Wesley Thomas	Cheltenham Town	18
10	(England) Shaun Harrad	Burton Albion; Northampton Town	16
10	(England) Marc Richards	Port Vale	16

=== Top assists ===
Rank	Player	Club	Assists
1	(England) Ryan Hall	Southend United	16
2	(England) Nicky Law	Rotherham United	12
3	(England) Shaun Miller	Crewe Alexandra	11
4	(England) Matt Harrold	Shrewsbury Town	10
4	(Jamaica) Mark Marshall	Barnet	10
6	(England) Michael Jacobs	Northampton Town	9
6	(England) Craig Stanley	Torquay United	9
6	(England) Drew Talbot	Chesterfield	9
6	(England) Danny Whitaker	Chesterfield	9
10	(England) Jack Lester	Chesterfield	8
10	(England) Sean McConville	Accrington Stanley	8
10	(England) Lawrie Wilson	Stevenage	8

=== Scoring ===
- First goal of the season: (Jersey) Peter Vincenti for Stevenage against Macclesfield Town, 6:43 minutes (7 August 2010)
- Highest scoring game: 11 goals – Accrington Stanley 7–4 Gillingham (2 October 2010)
- Most goals scored in a game by one team: 8 goals
  - Crewe Alexandra 8–1 Cheltenham Town (2 April 2011)
- Widest winning margin: 7 goals
  - Crewe Alexandra 7–0 Barnet (21 August 2010)
  - Crewe Alexandra 8–1 Cheltenham Town (2 April 2011)
- Fewest games failed to score in: 7 – Crewe Alexandra
- Most games failed to score in: 17
  - Hereford United
  - Stevenage
  - Stockport County

=== Discipline ===
- Most yellow cards (club): 78 – Hereford United
- Most yellow cards (player): 13 – John McGrath (Burton Albion)
- Most red cards (club): 9 – Stevenage
- Most red cards (player): 2
  - Luke Foster (Stevenage)
  - Abdul Osman (Northampton Town)
  - Steven Schumacher (Bury)
  - Michael Townsend (Hereford United)
  - Jamie Vincent (Aldershot Town)
- Most fouls (club): 563 – Gillingham
- Most fouls (player): 94 – Matt Harold (Shrewsbury Town)

=== Clean sheets ===
- Most clean sheets: 17 – Wycombe Wanderers
- Fewest clean sheets: 6 – Stockport County

== Monthly awards ==
Month	Manager of the Month		Player of the Month	
Month	Manager	Club	Player	Club
August	(England) Paul Buckle	Torquay United	(England) Adam Le Fondre	Rotherham United
September	(England) Micky Adams	Port Vale	(England) Ryan Lowe	Bury
October	(Wales) Alan Knill	Bury	(Wales) Craig Davies	Chesterfield
November	(England) Micky Adams	Port Vale	(England) Mark Wright	Shrewsbury Town
December	(England) Andy Hessenthaler	Gillingham	(England) Greg Tansey	Stockport County
January	(Italy) Dario Gradi	Crewe Alexandra	(England) Cody McDonald	Gillingham
February	(England) Graham Turner	Shrewsbury Town	(England) Ryan Lowe	Bury
March	(England) Dean Holdsworth	Aldershot Town	(Wales) Craig Davies	Chesterfield
April	(England) Richie Barker	Bury	(England) Ryan Lowe	Bury
