= Jamie Lowry =

English footballer and coach

Personal information
- Full name: Jamie Lowry
- Date of birth: 18 March 1987 (age 39)
- Place of birth: Newquay, England
- Height: 6 ft 0 in (1.83 m)
- Position: Midfielder

Team information
- Current team: Newquay

Senior career*
| Years | Team | Apps | (Gls) |
| 2006–2012 | Chesterfield | 113 | (11) |
| 2011–2012 | → Crewe Alexandra (loan) | 10 | (0) |
| 2012–2013 | Plymouth Argyle | 9 | (0) |
| 2013 | Tiverton Town | 3 | (0) |
| 2013 | Godolphin Atlantic | 2 | (2) |
| 2013–2014 | Truro City | 42 | (2) |
| 2014–2017 | Godolphin Atlantic | | |
| 2018–2021 | Plymouth Parkway | 20 | (0) |
| 2023–2025 | Truro City Reserves | 7 | (1) |
| 2025– | Newquay | 3 | (0) |

Managerial career
- 2016–2017: Godolphin Atlantic (player-manager)
- 2018–: Plymouth Argyle (youth coach)
- * Club domestic league appearances and goals as of 23:18, 20 December 2025 (UTC)

Jamie Lowry (born 18 March 1987) is an English footballer who plays for Newquay and is a youth development coach at Plymouth Argyle.

Born in Newquay, his previous clubs include Chesterfield, Crewe Alexandra and Plymouth Argyle. He made his debut in the Football League in 2006. He can play in many positions, including all across the midfield and as a right-back.

== Career ==
=== Chesterfield and Crewe Alexandra ===
After completing his youth scholarship in 2006, Lowry was offered a two-year contract by Chesterfield which he accepted, and went on to make his professional football debut later that season. He scored his first goal for the club in the next season while playing against Peterborough United.

In October 2009 he injured his cruciate knee ligament and was sidelined for the rest of the season. He made his return from this career threatening injury as a 92nd-minute substitute on 19 February 2011 in Chesterfield's 2–0 win over Lincoln City. Towards the end of Lee Richardson's reign as manager, Lowry was deployed in a central midfield role. He originally joined Chesterfield as youth player after being recommended to the club by his grandfather, a native of Chesterfield. Following the recommendation, the club offered the player two weeks' work experience before eventually offering Lowry a place in the Youth Academy.

On 25 November 2011 Jamie moved to Crewe Alexandra where he was given some much-needed playing time in midfield. His loan spell was extended after a month but on 30 January 2012 he was recalled to Chesterfield and on the same evening played in the second leg of the Northern Final of the Football League Trophy at Boundary Park, and helped his side beat Oldham Athletic and qualify for the final, to be held at Wembley on 25 March 2012. He was released by Chesterfield at the end of the 2011–12 season.

=== Plymouth Argyle ===
Lowry signed for Football League Two club Plymouth Argyle on 11 July. Having suffered an ankle injury during a pre-season friendly, he returned to make 11 appearances between October and January. Lowry was released from his contract at the end of the 2012–13 season.

=== Non-league ===
After leaving Plymouth, Lowry had a brief spell with Southern League Division One club Tiverton Town, arriving in August 2013 and leaving the club on 2 September. He then spent a short period with South West Peninsula League club Godolphin Atlantic, based in his home town of Newquay, scoring twice on his debut, and getting sent off in his second game.

Lowry signed for Southern Premier side Truro City on 12 September 2013. He left the club for personal reasons on 14 November 2014, just over a month after becoming Head of Youth Development at his former club Godolphin Atlantic.

He started playing for the Gs as well, notably scoring the first goal in a 3–1 win in the 2015 SWPLeague Cup Final against Plymouth Parkway. In May 2016 he was appointed player-manager at Godolphin, guiding the team to a 13th-place finish in the league that season, before stepping down in May 2017, citing a desire to "resurrect his pro playing career".

Despite stepping down from management, Lowry confirmed he would stay on at Godolphin Atlantic as a player. In February 2018, Lowry joined Plymouth Argyle as a youth coach, and in October 2018, he became dual registered to play for both Godolphin in the South West Peninsula League and newly promoted Plymouth Parkway in the Western Football League. In 2025, he joined Newquay.
