= List of Chesterfield F.C. seasons =

Chesterfield Football Club is an English association football club based in the Derbyshire town of Chesterfield. The current club dates from 1919, but the histories of earlier Chesterfield-based clubs are generally discussed alongside that of the current club. The first Chesterfield F.C. was founded in the mid-1860s and survived until 1881, long before league football existed. The second incarnation, which became known as Chesterfield Town F.C., was formed in 1884. Its first team joined and won the Sheffield & District League in 1891–92, and first entered the FA Cup the following season. Drawn away to Gainsborough Trinity in the first qualifying round, the score stood at 2–2 at full time; Trinity scored twice during extra time, but darkness fell before the agreed half hour was complete, so the match was ordered to be replayed. Chesterfield lost the replay 4–0. They continued in the Sheffield leagues until joining the Midland Football League in 1896. After three top-four finishes, Chesterfield were elected to the Second Division of the Football League for the 1899–1900 season. The team generally struggled in the Football League: they placed fifth in 1904–05, but followed up with four consecutive bottom-three positions. Three times they successfully applied for re-election to the League, but the fourth application failed, and Chesterfield returned to the Midland League in 1909. Despite winning the title that season, they were not accepted back into the Football League, and continued in the Midland League until competitive football was suspended for the duration of the First World War.

Chesterfield Town went into voluntary liquidation in 1915. A third club, formed to participate in the wartime competitions, failed because of financial irregularities, and when competitive football resumed, Chesterfield Council founded its own club, Chesterfield Municipal. They won the first post-war Midland League title – and were expelled from that season's FA Cup for fielding an ineligible player (Note: After beating South Normanton Colliery in the second qualifying round, Chesterfield were disqualified for fielding an ineligible player. Although the FA commission accepted the directors' claim that they genuinely believed the player not to be cup-tied, because they suspended him for a month for "wilfully misleading the Chesterfield club", they still expelled the club from the competition despite it being within the rules and their discretion for them to impose a lesser sanction.) – but when the football authorities made clear their opposition to municipal ownership of clubs, the council's involvement ceased and the club was renamed Chesterfield F.C. It was a founder member of the Football League Third Division North, spent much of the 1920s in the top half of that division, and won the title in 1930–31. They retained their Second Division status for just two seasons, won a further Third Division North championship in 1936, and remained in the second tier until the interruption for war and for five seasons thereafter. Consistent top-half finishes meant Chesterfield were allocated to the Third Division when the regional sections were amalgamated into Third and Fourth Divisions in 1958, but they lasted only three seasons before making their debut at the lower level.

Chesterfield were promoted as 1969–70 Fourth Division champions. In 1980–81, they entered and won the last edition of the Anglo-Scottish Cup, defeating Scottish giants Rangers 3–0 in the quarter-finals before beating Notts County in the final. Two years later, they were relegated, and came close to folding, with debts of £400,000 and only seven contracted professionals, before bouncing back to win their second Fourth Division title in 1985. Over the next 30 years, they experienced four relegations and four promotions between third and fourth tiers. Promoted via the play-offs in 1995, they came within a point of the play-offs the following season, and reached the semi-final of the FA Cup in 1996–97, in which they faced Middlesbrough of the Premier League. With 21 minutes left and Chesterfield leading 2–1, Jonathan Howard shot against the underside of the bar; the ball bounced down and then out, and referee David Elleray ruled, incorrectly, that it had not crossed the line. A minute later, he awarded a penalty to Middlesbrough for a foul that took place outside the penalty area. Middlesbrough scored, and took a 3–2 lead in extra time, but Jamie Hewitt equalised with seconds left. Chesterfield lost the replay 3–0.

In 2000–01, a nine-point deduction for financial irregularities, initially deemed too lenient by the Football League, failed to prevent Chesterfield's automatic promotion in third place, and the following year the club was taken out of administration into the ownership and control of the Chesterfield Football Supporters' Society. In the second round of the 2008–09 FA Cup, Chesterfield lost to non-league club Droylsden, but were awarded the tie when their opponents were found to have fielded an ineligible player; when Chesterfield did the same in 2014–15, they were only required to replay the tie, and won. They again won the fourth-tier title in 2010–11 and the following season won the Football League Trophy, a cup competition open to teams from the two lower divisions of the Football League, beating Swindon Town 2–0 in the final. Chesterfield won the fourth-tier championship for a league record fourth time in 2013–14, and again reached the Football League Trophy final; this time they lost 3–1 to Peterborough United. Two consecutive bottom-of-the-table finishes took them back to non-league football in 2018. After two successive defeats in the play-offs, they came closest to a return to League football in 2023 when losing on penalties to Notts County in the play-off final.

Since their first admission to the Football League in 1899, Chesterfield have spent 20 seasons in the second tier of the English football league system, 55 in the third, 25 in the fourth and 13 in non-league football. The table details the team's achievements and the top goalscorer in senior first-team competitions from their first season in the Sheffield & District League in 1891–92 to the end of the most recently completed season.

== Key ==
Key to league record:

- P – Played
- W – Games won
- D – Games drawn
- L – Games lost
- F – Goals for
- A – Goals against
- Pts – Points
- Pos – Final position

Key to colours and symbols:
Symbol	Meaning
1st or W	Winners
2nd or F	Runners-up
↑	Promoted
↓	Relegated
♦	Top league scorer in Chesterfield's division

Key to divisions:

- Sheff &D – Sheffield & District League
- Sheff CC – Sheffield Challenge Cup (Note: During the period that Chesterfield took part in this competition, it was conducted on a league basis.)
- Midland – Midland League
- Div 2 – Football League Second Division
- Div 3 – Football League Third Division
- Div 3N – Football League Third Division North
- Div 4 – Football League Fourth Division
- League 1 – Football League One, EFL League One
- League 2 – Football League Two, EFL League Two
- Nat – National League

Key to rounds:

- Prelim – Preliminary round
- QR1 – First qualifying round
- QR2 – Second qualifying round, etc.
- Inter – Intermediate round (between qualifying rounds and rounds proper)
- R1 – First round
- R2 – Second round, etc.
- QF – Quarter-final
- SF – Semi-final
- F – Final
- W – Winners
- (N) – Northern section of regionalised stage

Details of the abandoned 1939–40 Football League season are shown in italics and appropriately footnoted.

== Seasons ==
List of seasons, including league division and statistics, cup results and top scorer(s)
Season	League									FA Cup	League Cup (Note: The League Cup competition started in the 1960–61 season.)	Other		Top league scorer(s) (Note: Football League seasons up to and including 1995–96 sourced to the English National Football Archive; seasons from 1996–97 onwards sourced to Soccerbase.)	
Season	Div (Note: From the 1899–1900 Football League season onwards, divisions are sorted according to their level within the English football league system, and separately from the non-League divisions.)	P	W	D	L	F	A	Pts	Pos	FA Cup	League Cup	Competition	Result	Name	Goals
1891–92	Sheff &D	18	14	2	2	63	34	30	1st	—	—	—	—	Not known	—
1892–93	Sheff &D	26	14	8	4	59	34	32	5th	QR1	—	—	—	Not known	—
1893–94	Sheff CC	26	11	11	4	65	49	26	6th	QR3	—	—	—	Not known	—
1894–95	Sheff CC	28	17	8	3	68	44	37	3rd	R1	—	—	—	Not known	—
1895–96	Sheff CC	28	16	9	3	71	37	35	5th	R1	—	—	—	Not known	—
1896–97	Midland	28	13	6	9	74	53	32	4th	QR4	—	—	—	Not known	—
1897–98	Midland	22	11	7	4	54	23	29	3rd	QR3	—	—	—	Not known	—
1898–99	Midland ↑	26	14	3	9	59	42	31	4th	QR4	—	—	—	Not known	—
1899–1900	Div 2	34	16	6	12	65	60	38	7th	QR5	—	—	—	Herbert Munday	20
1900–01	Div 2	34	9	10	15	46	58	28	14th	R1	—	—	—	Herbert Munday	9
1901–02	Div 2	34	11	6	17	47	68	28	16th (Note: Successfully applied for re-election to the Football League.)	Inter	—	—	—	Tommy Brown	10
1902–03	Div 2	34	14	9	11	67	40	37	6th	QR4	—	—	—	Herbert Munday	15
1903–04	Div 2	34	11	8	15	37	45	30	11th	QR5	—	—	—	Herbert Munday	12
1904–05	Div 2	34	14	11	9	44	35	39	5th	Inter	—	—	—	Herbert Munday	13
1905–06	Div 2	38	10	8	20	40	72	28	18th	R2	—	—	—	Herbert Munday	12
1906–07	Div 2	38	11	7	20	50	66	29	18th	R1	—	—	—	Herbert Munday	12
1907–08	Div 2	38	6	11	21	46	92	23	19th	R2	—	—	—	Chippy Simmons	7
1908–09	Div 2 ↓	38	11	8	19	37	67	30	19th (Note: Failed to be re-elected to the Football League, receiving three votes fewer than Midland League club Lincoln City.)	R1	—	—	—	Proctor Hall	7
1909–10	Midland	42	27	7	8	102	44	61	1st	R1	—	—	—	Not known	—
1910–11	Midland	38	20	5	13	80	61	45	5th	R2	—	—	—	Not known	—
1911–12	Midland	36	14	8	14	63	62	36	12th	QR4	—	—	—	Not known	—
1912–13	Midland	38	20	11	7	78	41	51	2nd	R1	—	—	—	Not known	—
1913–14	Midland	34	19	4	11	80	43	42	3rd	R1	—	—	—	Not known	—
1914–15	Midland	38	20	10	8	76	41	50	3rd	QR5	—	—	—	Not known	—
1915–19	The Midland League and FA Cup were suspended until after the First World War.														
1919–20	Midland	34	24	5	5	78	35	53	1st	Disq	—	—	—	Not known	—
1920–21	Midland ↑	38	18	11	9	70	46	47	3rd	QR3	—	—	—	Not known	—
1921–22	Div 3N	38	16	3	19	48	67	35	13th	QR5	—	—	—	Harry Williams	10
1922–23	Div 3N	38	19	7	12	68	52	45	4th	QR6	—	—	—	George Beel	23 ♦
1923–24	Div 3N	42	22	10	10	70	39	54	3rd	QR6	—	—	—	Harold Crockford	19
1924–25	Div 3N	42	17	11	14	60	44	45	7th	QR6	—	—	—	Norman Whitfield	11
1925–26	Div 3N	42	25	5	12	100	54	55	4th	R3	—	—	—	Jimmy Cookson	44 ♦
1926–27	Div 3N	42	21	5	16	92	68	47	7th	R3	—	—	—	Jimmy Cookson	41
1927–28	Div 3N	42	13	10	19	71	78	36	16th	R1	—	—	—	Ralph Williams	15
1928–29	Div 3N	42	18	5	19	71	77	41	11th	R3	—	—	—	Sam Taylor	20
1929–30	Div 3N	42	22	6	14	76	56	50	4th	R3	—	—	—	Jimmy Bullock	31
1930–31	Div 3N ↑	42	26	6	10	102	57	58	1st	R1	—	—	—	Albert Pynegar	26
1931–32	Div 2	42	13	11	18	64	86	37	17th	R4	—	—	—	Sam Abel	20
1932–33	Div 2 ↓	42	12	10	20	61	84	34	21st	R5	—	—	—	Sam Abel	17
1933–34	Div 3N	42	27	7	8	86	43	61	2nd	R3	—	Third Division North Cup	R3	Colin Cook	28
1934–35	Div 3N	42	17	10	15	71	52	44	10th	R3	—	Third Division North Cup	R3	Harry Brown	14
1935–36	Div 3N ↑	42	24	12	6	92	39	60	1st	R2	—	Third Division North Cup	R3	Maurice Dando	29
1936–37	Div 2	42	16	8	18	84	89	40	15th	R3	—	—	—	Wally Ponting	26
1937–38	Div 2	42	16	9	17	63	63	41	11th	R5	—	—	—	Harry Clifton	26
1938–39	Div 2	42	20	9	13	69	52	49	6th	R3	—	—	—	Tom Lyon	22
1939–40	Div 2	2	1	0	1	2	2	2	(Note: The 1939–40 season was abandoned with three matches played when the Second World War began.)	—	—	—	—	Tom Lyon; Dudley Milligan	1
1939–45	The Football League and FA Cup were suspended until after the Second World War.														
1945–46	—	—	—	—	—	—	—	—	—	R3 (Note: Although the Football League did not resume until the 1946–47 season, the FA Cup was contested in 1945–46. From the first round proper to the sixth round (quarter-final), results were determined on aggregate score over two legs.)	—	—	—	—	—
1946–47	Div 2	42	18	14	10	58	44	50	4th	R4	—	—	—	Sid Ottewell; Tom Swinscoe	12
1947–48	Div 2	42	16	7	19	54	55	39	16th	R3	—	—	—	Tommy Capel	16
1948–49	Div 2	42	15	17	10	51	45	47	6th	R3	—	—	—	Jackie Hudson	12
1949–50	Div 2	42	15	9	18	43	47	39	14th	R5	—	—	—	Jackie Hudson; Hugh McJarrow	9
1950–51	Div 2 ↓	42	9	12	21	44	69	30	21st	R3	—	—	—	Chris Marron	11
1951–52	Div 3N	46	17	11	18	65	66	45	13th	R2	—	—	—	Chris Marron	12
1952–53	Div 3N	46	18	11	17	65	63	47	12th (Note: Chesterfield finished joint twelfth, with an identical record to that of Tranmere Rovers.)	R2	—	—	—	Dennis Westcott	21
1953–54	Div 3N	46	19	14	13	76	64	52	6th	R4	—	—	—	George Smith	19
1954–55	Div 3N	46	24	6	16	81	70	54	6th	R1	—	—	—	George Smith	18
1955–56	Div 3N	46	25	4	17	94	66	54	6th	R2	—	—	—	Billy Sowden	32
1956–57	Div 3N	46	22	9	15	96	79	53	6th	R3	—	—	—	George Smith	16
1957–58	Div 3N	46	18	15	13	71	69	51	8th	R1	—	—	—	Gwyn Lewis	24
1958–59	Div 3	46	17	10	19	67	64	44	16th	R3	—	—	—	Brian Frear	19
1959–60	Div 3	46	18	7	21	71	84	43	18th	R1	—	—	—	Brian Frear	15
1960–61	Div 3 ↓	46	10	12	24	67	87	32	24th	R3	R3	—	—	Keith Havenhand	21
1961–62	Div 4	44	14	9	21	70	87	37	19th	R2	R1	—	—	Dave Kerry	16
1962–63	Div 4	46	13	16	17	70	64	42	15th	R2	R1	—	—	Charlie Rackstraw	12
1963–64	Div 4	46	15	12	19	57	71	42	16th	R3	R1	—	—	Charlie Rackstraw	15
1964–65	Div 4	46	20	8	18	58	70	48	12th	R3	R4	—	—	John Beresford; Ivan Hollett	9
1965–66	Div 4	46	13	13	20	62	78	39	20th	R1	R3	—	—	Ivan Hollett	20
1966–67	Div 4	46	17	8	21	60	63	42	15th	R1	R2	—	—	Ivan Hollett; Billy Stark	15
1967–68	Div 4	46	21	11	14	71	50	53	7th	R3	R1	—	—	Kevin Randall	20
1968–69	Div 4	46	13	15	18	43	50	41	20th	R3	R1	—	—	Kevin Randall	18
1969–70	Div 4 ↑	46	27	10	9	77	32	64	1st	R1	R1	—	—	Ernie Moss	20
1970–71	Div 3	46	17	17	12	66	38	51	5th	R2	R1	—	—	Kevin Randall	19
1971–72	Div 3	46	18	8	20	57	57	44	13th	R3	R2	—	—	Kevin Randall; Dave Wilson	11
1972–73	Div 3	46	17	9	20	57	61	43	16th	R2	R3	—	—	Ray McHale	10
1973–74	Div 3	46	21	14	11	55	42	56	5th	R1	R3	—	—	Ernie Moss	17
1974–75	Div 3	46	16	12	18	62	66	44	15th	R3	R2	—	—	Ernie Moss	20
1975–76	Div 3	46	17	9	20	69	69	43	14th	R1	R1	—	—	Malcolm Darling	18
1976–77	Div 3	46	14	10	22	56	64	38	18th	R2	R1	—	—	Rodney Fern	18
1977–78	Div 3	46	17	14	15	58	49	48	9th	R2	R2	—	—	Rodney Fern	14
1978–79	Div 3	46	13	14	19	51	65	40	20th	R1	R3	—	—	Rodney Fern	11
1979–80	Div 3	46	23	11	12	71	46	57	4th	R1	R3	—	—	Ernie Moss	14
1980–81	Div 3	46	23	10	13	72	48	56	5th	R3	R2	Anglo-Scottish Cup	W	Alan Birch	22
1981–82	Div 3	46	18	10	18	57	58	64 (Note: The 1981–82 season saw the introduction of three points for a win instead of two.)	11th	R2	R1	Football League Group Cup (Note: The Football League Group Cup succeeded the Anglo-Scottish Cup after the Scottish clubs decided to abandon the competition.)	Group	Phil Bonnyman	14
1982–83	Div 3 ↓	46	8	13	25	43	68	37	24th	R1	R1	Football League Group Cup	Group	Martin Henderson	10
1983–84	Div 4	46	15	15	16	59	61	60	13th	R2	R2	Associate Members' Cup	R1(N)	Bob Newton	13
1984–85	Div 4 ↑	46	26	13	7	64	35	91	1st	R2	R1	Associate Members' Cup	R2(N)	Bob Newton	15
1985–86	Div 3	46	13	14	19	61	64	53	17th	R1	R1	Associate Members' Cup	Prelim(N)	Ernie Moss	14
1986–87	Div 3	46	13	15	18	56	69	54	17th	R1	R1	Associate Members' Cup	R1(N)	Dave Caldwell	14
1987–88	Div 3	46	15	10	21	41	70	55	18th	R1	R1	Associate Members' Cup	R1(N)	Dave Waller	19
1988–89	Div 3 ↓	46	14	7	25	51	86	49	22nd	R1	R1	Associate Members' Cup	QF(N)	Dave Waller	18
1989–90	Div 4	46	19	14	13	63	50	71	7th (Note: Beat Stockport County 6–0 on aggregate in the play-off semi-final before losing 1–0 to Cambridge United in the final.)	R2	R1	Associate Members' Cup	Prelim(N)	Dave Waller	16
1990–91	Div 4	46	13	14	19	47	62	53	18th	R2	R1	Associate Members' Cup	Prelim(N)	Lee Turnbull	9
1991–92	Div 4	42	14	11	17	49	61	53	13th	R1	R1	Associate Members' Cup	R1(N)	Steve Norris	10
1992–93	Div 3 (Note: When the newly formed FA Premier League split from the Football League, the remaining divisions of the Football League were renumbered upwards.)	42	15	11	16	59	63	56	12th	R1	R2	Football League Trophy	SF(N)	Steve Norris	11
1993–94	Div 3	42	16	14	12	55	48	62	8th	R1	R2	Football League Trophy	R1(N)	Steve Norris	20
1994–95	Div 3 ↑	42	23	12	7	62	37	81	3rd (Note: Beat Mansfield Town 6–3 on aggregate in the play-off semi-final before beating Bury 2–0 in the final to gain promotion to the Second Division.)	R1	R2	Football League Trophy	R2(N)	Kevin Davies	11
1995–96	Div 2	46	20	12	14	56	51	72	7th	R2	R1	Football League Trophy	SF(N)	Tony Lormor	13
1996–97	Div 2	46	18	14	14	42	39	68	10th	SF	R1	Football League Trophy	R1(N)	Jonathan Howard	9
1997–98	Div 2	46	16	17	13	46	44	65	10th	R2	R2	Football League Trophy	R1(N)	Roger Willis	8
1998–99	Div 2	46	17	13	16	46	44	64	9th	R1	R2	Football League Trophy	QF(N)	Dave Reeves	10
1999–2000	Div 2 ↓	46	7	15	24	34	63	36	24th	R1	R2	Football League Trophy	SF(N)	Dave Reeves	14
2000–01	Div 3 ↑	46	25	14	7	79	42	80 (Note: Nine points deducted for financial irregularities.)	3rd	R1	R2	Football League Trophy	SF(N)	Luke Beckett	16
2001–02	Div 2	46	13	13	20	53	65	52	18th	R2	R1	Football League Trophy	QF(N)	Glynn Hurst	9
2002–03	Div 2	46	14	8	24	43	73	50	20th	R1	R2	Football League Trophy	R2(N)	Dave Reeves	8
2003–04	Div 2	46	12	15	19	49	71	51	20th	R1	R1	Football League Trophy	R2(N)	Glynn Hurst	13
2004–05	League 1 (Note: From the 2004–05 season, the Football League divisions were rebranded: Division One was renamed the Football League Championship, and Divisions Two and Three became Football League One and Football League Two respectively.)	46	14	15	17	55	62	57	17th	R1	R1	Football League Trophy	R1(N)	Tcham N'Toya	8
2005–06	League 1	46	14	14	18	63	73	56	16th	R1	R1	Football League Trophy	R1(N)	Paul Hall	15
2006–07	League 1 ↓	46	12	11	23	45	53	47	21st	R1	R4	Football League Trophy	SF(N)	Caleb Folan	8
2007–08	League 2	46	19	12	15	76	56	69	8th	R1	R1	Football League Trophy	R1(N)	Jack Lester	25
2008–09	League 2	46	16	15	15	62	57	63	10th	R3	R1	Football League Trophy	R1(N)	Jack Lester	20 ♦
2009–10	League 2	46	21	7	18	61	62	70	8th	R1	R1	Football League Trophy	QF(N)	Jack Lester	11
2010–11	League 2 ↑	46	24	14	8	85	51	86	1st	R2	R1	Football League Trophy	R2(N)	Craig Davies	23
2011–12	League 1 ↓	46	10	12	24	55	81	42	22nd	R1	R1	Football League Trophy	W	Leon Clarke	9
2012–13	League 2	46	18	13	15	60	45	67	8th	R2	R1	Football League Trophy	R2(N)	Marc Richards	12
2013–14	League 2 ↑	46	23	15	8	71	40	84	1st	R2	R1	Football League Trophy	F	Eoin Doyle; Gary Roberts	11
2014–15	League 1	46	19	12	15	68	55	69	6th (Note: Lost 4–0 on aggregate to Preston North End in the play-off semi-final.)	R4	R1	Football League Trophy	R1(N)	Eoin Doyle	21
2015–16	League 1	46	15	8	23	58	70	53	18th	R2	R1	Football League Trophy	R2(N)	Lee Novak	14
2016–17	League 1 ↓	46	9	10	27	43	78	37	24th	R2	R1	EFL Trophy	R3	Kristian Dennis	8
2017–18	League 2 ↓	46	10	8	28	47	83	38	24th	R1	R1	EFL Trophy	R2(N)	Kristian Dennis	19
2018–19	Nat	46	14	17	15	55	53	59	14th	R2	—	FA Trophy	R3	Scott Boden	10
2019–20	Nat	38	11	11	16	55	65	44	20th (Note: The 2019–20 football season was disrupted by the effects of the COVID-19 pandemic. The National League was suspended in mid-March 2020 and the clubs voted six weeks later to end the regular season programme. Teams had not all played the same number of matches, so it was agreed to construct final league tables on an unweighted points per game basis. Chesterfield placed 20th.)	QR4	—	FA Trophy	R1	Scott Boden; Mike Fondop-Talom	10
2020–21	Nat	42	21	6	15	60	43	69	6th (Note: Lost to fifth-placed Notts County in the play-off quarter-finals.)	QR4 (Note: Chesterfield's fourth qualifying round win against Stockport County was ordered to be replayed because they fielded an ineligible player. Stockport won the replay 4–0.)	—	FA Trophy	R5 (Note: Chesterfield's fifth-round tie against Aldershot was called off at the last minute after a player tested positive for COVID-19. The rules required it to be rescheduled within five days of the original date, but with the first-team staff in self-isolation, the club reluctantly withdrew from the competition rather than field an unprepared youth team.)	Akwasi Asante	10
2021–22	Nat	44	20	14	10	69	51	74	7th (Note: Lost to third-placed Solihull Moors in the play-off semi-finals.)	R3	—	FA Trophy	R3 (Note: The third-round tie against Guiseley was called off after Chesterfield players tested positive for COVID-19. As in the previous season, the club opted to withdraw from the competition.)	Kabongo Tshimanga	24
2022–23	Nat	46	25	9	12	81	52	84	3rd (Note: After beating Bromley after extra time in the semi-final, lost on penalties to second-placed Notts County in the play-off final.)	R3	—	FA Trophy	R3	Liam Mandeville	9
2023–24	Nat ↑	46	31	5	10	106	65	98	1st	R3	—	FA Trophy	R4	Will Grigg	24
2024–25	League 2	46	19	13	14	73	54	70	7th (Note: Lost to 4th place Walsall in the play-off semi-finals.)	R2	R1	EFL Trophy	R2	Will Grigg	12
