= Michael Onovwigun =

English footballer (born 1996)

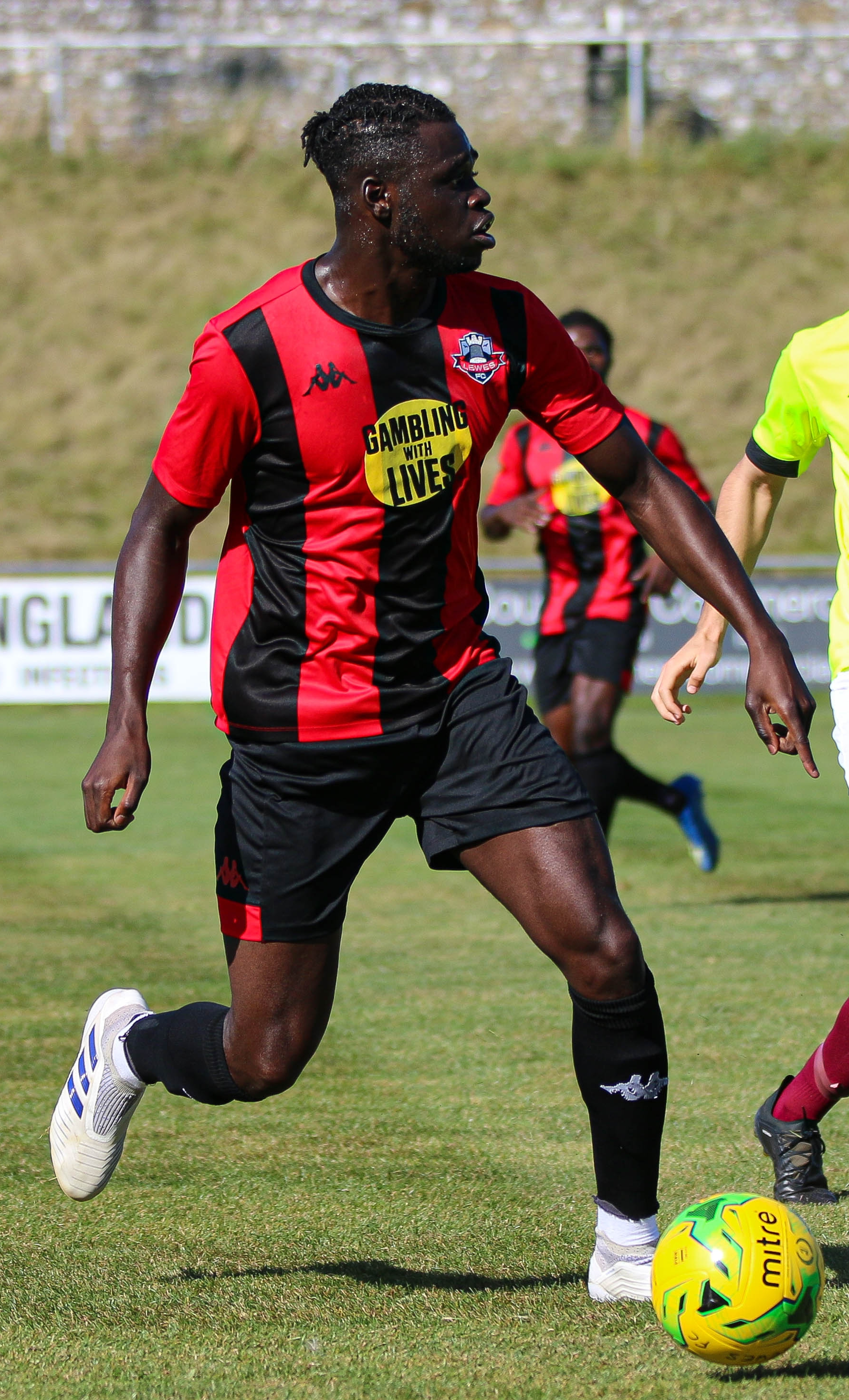
- Onovwigun playing for Lewes in September 2019

Personal information
- Full name: Michael Richie Onovwigun
- Date of birth: 9 April 1996 (age 30)
- Place of birth: Clapham, England
- Height: 1.91 m (6 ft 3 in)
- Position: Central midfielder

Team information
- Current team: Tooting & Mitcham United

Youth career
- 2011–2014: Brentford

Senior career*
Years	Team	Apps	(Gls)
2014–2016	Chesterfield	6	(0)
2014–2015	→ Sheffield (loan)	5	(1)
2015	→ Stalybridge Celtic (loan)	1	(0)
2016	→ Gateshead (loan)	3	(0)
2016	Dulwich Hamlet	2	(0)
2016	Kingstonian	9	(2)
2016–2017	Farnborough	4	(0)
2017	Southport	1	(0)
2017	Merstham	1	(0)
2017–2019	Dulwich Hamlet	31	(0)
2018	→ Carshalton Athletic (loan)	13	(1)
2019	Carshalton Athletic	2	(0)
2019	Lewes	12	(0)
2020	Dartford	0	(0)
2020	→ Staines Town (dual-reg)	5	(1)
2020	Maldon & Tiptree	3	(0)
2023	AFC Whyteleafe	5	(0)
2024–2025	Corinthian-Casuals	19	(0)
2025–	Tooting & Mitcham United	31	(2)
Total		153	(7)
- * Club domestic league appearances and goals as of 22:25, 12 August 2026 (UTC)

Michael Richie Onovwigun (born 9 April 1996) is an English semi-professional footballer who plays as a central midfielder for Combined Counties League Premier Division South club Tooting & Mitcham United.

Onovwigun was a product of the Brentford academy and began his professional career with Chesterfield in 2014. After his release in 2016, Onovwigun embarked on a journeyman career in non-League football.

== Playing career ==
=== Brentford ===
Born in Clapham, London, Onovwigun began his career in the academy at Brentford and signed a two-year scholarship during the 2012 off-season. After featuring regularly for the Development Squad in friendly matches during the 2012–13 pre-season, Onovwigun was called into the first team squad for a friendly versus Wycombe Wanderers on 7 August 2012 and he replaced Jake Reeves after 73 minutes of the 4–1 victory. Onovwigun made over 50 appearances for the youth team and 9 for the Development Squad between 2011 and 2014 and departed the club at the end of the 2013–14 season, after failing to be offered a professional contract.

=== Chesterfield ===
==== 2014–15 season and loans to Sheffield and Stalybridge Celtic ====
On 31 July 2014, Onovwigun signed a one-year professional Development Squad contract at League One club Chesterfield after a successful trial. He received his maiden call into the first team squad for a league match versus Rochdale on 16 August and made his professional debut when he came on as an 89th-minute substitute for Jimmy Ryan in a 2–1 win. Onovwigun joined Northern Premier League First Division South club Sheffield on a loan that was later extended until 3 January 2015. He made eight appearances and scored two goals for the club. On 6 February 2015, Onovwigun and Chesterfield teammate Charlie Dawes joined Conference North club Stalybridge Celtic on one month loans. He made just one appearance and after his return to Chesterfield, he had a run of three first team calls in March 2015 and made one substitute appearance against Gillingham in the middle of the month. Onovwigun finished the 2014–15 season with three appearances and the option to extend his contract was taken up for another season.

==== 2015–16 season and loan to Gateshead ====
Onovwigun made his only appearance of the 2015–16 season as a substitute during a 3–1 League Cup first round extra time defeat to Carlisle United on 11 August 2015. On 24 March 2016, he joined National League club Gateshead on loan until the end of the 2015–16 season. Onovwigun made three appearances he departed Chesterfield when his contract expired.

=== Non-League football ===
==== 2016–17 season ====
On 16 August 2016, Onovwigun transferred to Isthmian League Premier Division club Dulwich Hamlet. He made just two appearances, before moving within the division to join Kingstonian on 31 August. After making 11 appearances and scoring two goals, he transferred to Southern League First Division Central club Farnborough on 24 November. Onovwigun moved back up to the National League to join Southport on 7 January 2017 and returned to the Isthmian League Premier Division to sign for Merstham on 6 March.

==== 2017–2019 ====
Onovwigun rejoined Dulwich Hamlet at the beginning of the 2017–18 season and was a part of the team which secured promotion to the National League South, though he did not feature in Hamlet's successful Isthmian League Premier Division play-off campaign. After signing a new contract, Onovwigun joined Isthmian League Premier Division club Carshalton Athletic on a three-month loan in September 2018 and after returning to Dulwich Hamlet for the second half of the 2018–19 season, he rejoined Carshalton on a permanent basis during the 2019 off-season.

==== 2019–20 season ====
Onovwigun made two early-2019–20 season appearances for Carshalton Athletic, before transferring to division rivals Lewes in late August 2019. Until his release in December 2019, Onovwigun was a regular member of the Lewes team and he moved up to the National League South to join Dartford in January 2020. After just one appearance for the Darts, he joined Isthmian League South Central Division club Staines Town on a dual-registration deal in February and then moved to North Division club Maldon & Tiptree on a permanent transfer in early March. Onovwigun made three appearances for the Jammers, before the 2019–20 Isthmian League season was ended early. He announced his retirement from non-League football in July 2020.

==== 2022–present ====
Onovwigun made five appearances for Southern Counties East League First Division club AFC Whyteleafe during the 2022–23 season. He made 21 appearances for Combined Counties League Premier Division South club Corinthian-Casuals during the 2024–25 season. In July 2025, Onovwigun transferred across the division to Tooting & Mitcham United. He made 41 appearances during a 2025–26 season in which the club reached the Combined Counties League Premier Division South playoff semi-finals. Onovwigun was retained for the 2026–27 season.

=== Sunday league football ===
In 2020, Onovwigun dropped into Sunday league football and joined Orpington & Bromley District Sunday League Senior Division club Lambeth Allstars.

== Personal life ==
Onovwigun attended a football and education programme at the University of East London.

== Career statistics ==
As of match played 11 August 2026

Appearances and goals by club, season and competition
Club	Season	League			FA Cup		EFL Cup		Other		Total	
Club	Season	Division	Apps	Goals	Apps	Goals	Apps	Goals	Apps	Goals	Apps	Goals
Chesterfield	2014–15	League One	2	0	0	0	0	0	1 (Note: Appearance in Football League Trophy)	0	3	0
Chesterfield	2015–16	League One	4	0	0	0	1	0	0	0	4	0
Chesterfield	Total		6	0	0	0	1	0	1	0	4	0
Sheffield (loan)	2014–15	Northern Premier League First Division South	5	1	—		—		3 (Note: 2 appearances in Northern Premier League Challenge Cup, 1 appearance and 1 goal in Sheffield & Hallamshire Senior Cup)	1	8	2
Stalybridge Celtic (loan)	2014–15	Conference North	1	0	—		—		—		1	0
Gateshead (loan)	2015–16	National League	3	0	—		—		—		3	0
Dulwich Hamlet	2016–17	Isthmian League Premier Division	2	0	—		—		—		2	0
Kingstonian	2016–17	Isthmian League Premier Division	9	2	1	0	—		1 (Note: Appearances in Isthmian League Cup)	0	11	2
Farnborough	2016–17	Southern League First Division Central	4	0	—		—		—		4	0
Southport	2016–17	National League	1	0	—		—		—		1	0
Merstham	2016–17	Isthmian League Premier Division	1	0	—		—		—		1	0
Dulwich Hamlet	2017–18	Isthmian League Premier Division	21	0	0	0	—		3 (Note: 2 appearances in Isthmian League Cup, 1 appearance in London Senior Cup)	0	24	0
Dulwich Hamlet	2018–19	National League South	10	0	0	0	—		2 (Note: Appearance in London Senior Cup)	0	12	0
Dulwich Hamlet	Total		33	0	0	0	—		5	0	38	0
Carshalton Athletic (loan)	2018–19	Isthmian League Premier Division	13	1	—		—		4 (Note: 2 appearances in FA Trophy, 1 appearance in Isthmian League Cup, 1 appearance in Surrey Senior Cup)	0	17	1
Carshalton Athletic	2019–20	Isthmian League Premier Division	2	0	—		—		—		2	0
Carshalton Athletic	Total		15	1	—		—		4	0	19	1
Lewes	2019–20	Isthmian League Premier Division	12	0	3	0	—		3 (Note: 2 appearances in Sussex Senior Challenge Cup, 1 appearance in FA Trophy)	0	18	0
Dartford	2019–20	National League South	0	0	—		—		1 (Note: Appearance in Kent Senior Cup)	0	1	0
Staines Town (dual-reg)	2019–20	Isthmian League South Central Division	5	1	—		—		—		5	1
Maldon & Tiptree	2019–20	Isthmian League North Division	3	0	—		—		—		3	0
AFC Whyteleafe	2022–23	Southern Counties East League First Division	5	0	—		—		—		5	0
Corinthian-Casuals	2024–25	Combined Counties League Premier Division South	19	0	2	0	—		0	0	21	0
Tooting & Mitcham United	2025–26	Combined Counties League Premier Division South	31	2	1	0	—		9 (Note: 3 appearances in FA Vase, 3 appearances in London Senior Cup, 2 appearances in Surrey Senior Cup, 1 appearance in Combined Counties League Premier Division South play-offs)	0	41	2
Tooting & Mitcham United	2026–27	Combined Counties League Premier Division South	0	0	1	0	—		0	0	1	0
Tooting & Mitcham United	Total		31	2	2	0	—		0	0	42	2
Career total			153	7	8	0	1	0	27	1	189	8
