= 2014–15 Chesterfield F.C. season =

Chesterfield F.C.
2014–15 season
- Chairman: Dave Allen
- Manager: Paul Cook (until 12 May 2015); Dean Saunders (from 13 May 2015)
- Stadium: Proact Stadium
- League One: 6th
- FA Cup: Fourth round
- League Cup: First round
- League Trophy: First round
Home colours	Away colours

Chesterfield F.C. is a team in the Football League One. In the 2014–2015 season they came a respectable 6th place in the league to qualify for the league play-offs.

== Pre-season friendlies ==
5 July 2014	Buxton	1–1	Chesterfield	Buxton
15:00 BST	Tuton 29'	Report	O'Shea 81'	Stadium: The Silverlands

9 July 2014	Matlock Town	1–4	Chesterfield	Matlock
19:30 BST	Andrews 76'	Report	Gnanduillet 13'; Morsy 60'; Doyle 66'; Gardner 89'	Stadium: Causeway Lane

12 July 2014	Shrewsbury Town	2–0	Chesterfield	Shrewsbury
15:00 BST	Collins 36'; Curran 55'	Report		Stadium: New Meadow

15 July 2014	Alfreton Town	1–5	Chesterfield	Alfreton
19:30 BST	Trialist 64'	Report	Gnanduillet 15', 23', 41'; Rowe-Turner 66' (o.g.); Raglan 70'	Stadium: North Street; Attendance: 595

19 July 2014	Lincoln City	2–1	Chesterfield	Lincoln
15:00 BST	Burrow 16'; Power 30'	Report	Dawes 31'	Stadium: Sincil Bank; Attendance: 952 (148 away fans)

26 July 2014	Chesterfield	2–2	Leeds United	Chesterfield
15:00 BST	Morsy 54', 66'	Report	Austin 48' (pen.), 87' (pen.)	Stadium: Proact Stadium

30 July 2014	Chesterfield	3–1	Aston Villa	Chesterfield
19:45 BST	Darikwa 6'; Hird 43'; Morsy 85'	Report	Grealish 51'	Stadium: Proact Stadium

== Competitions ==
=== League One ===
==== League table ====
Pos	Team	Pld	W	D	L	GF	GA	GD	Pts	Promotion, qualification or relegation
4	Swindon Town	46	23	10	13	76	57	+19	79	Qualification for League One play-offs (Note: Four teams play for one spot and promotion to Football League Championship.)
5	Sheffield United	46	19	14	13	66	53	+13	71	Qualification for League One play-offs
6	Chesterfield	46	19	12	15	68	55	+13	69	Qualification for League One play-offs
7	Bradford City	46	17	14	15	55	55	0	65	
8	Rochdale	46	19	6	21	72	66	+6	63	

Updated to match(es) played on 3 May 2015. Source: BBC Sport
Rules for classification: 1) Points; 2) Goal difference; 3) Number of goals scored

==== Matches ====
The fixtures for the 2014–15 season were announced on 18 June 2014 at 9am.

9 August 2014 1	Leyton Orient	1–2	Chesterfield	Leyton
15:00	Baudry (yellow card) 34'; Clarke (yellow card) 77'; Henderson 83'; Vincelot (yellow card) 85'	Summary	Boco 7' (yellow card) 90+4'; Doyle 79'	Stadium: Brisbane Road; Attendance: 5,619; Referee: Michael Bull

16 August 2014 2	Chesterfield	2–1	Rochdale	Chesterfield
15:00	Roberts (yellow card) 20'; Doyle 39' (pen.) 76' (pen.)	Report	Johny Diba (yellow card) 72'; Henderson (yellow card) 87' (goal) 90+10' (pen.)	Stadium: Proact Stadium; Attendance: 5,682; Referee: Carl Boyeson

19 August 2014 3	Chesterfield	0–1	Milton Keynes Dons	Chesterfield
19:45	Roberts (yellow card) 33'; Morsy (yellow card) 87'	Report	McFadzean (yellow card) 33'; Reeves (yellow card) 45+2'; Afobe 49'; Baldock (yellow card) 84'	Stadium: Proact Stadium; Attendance: 5,811; Referee: Darren Drysdale

23 August 2014 4	Fleetwood Town	0–0	Chesterfield	Fleetwood
15:00		Report		Stadium: Highbury Stadium; Attendance: 3,512; Referee: Andrew Madley

30 August 2014 5	Port Vale	1–2	Chesterfield	Burslem
15:00	Marshall 41'	Report	Doyle 9'; Roberts 46'; Evatt (red card) 83'	Stadium: Vale Park; Attendance: 5,593; Referee: Jeremy Simpson

13 September 2014 6	Chesterfield	4–1	Scunthorpe United	Chesterfield
15:00	Jones (yellow card) 31'; Doyle 55' 64' 72' (pen.); Morsy 88'	Report	Adelakun (yellow card) 33'; Madden 46'; Llera (yellow card) 50'; Dawson (yellow card) 66'; Canavan (yellow card) 72'	Stadium: Proact Stadium; Attendance: 6,227; Referee: (England) Graham Salisbury

16 September 2014 7	Preston North End	3–3	Chesterfield	Preston
19:45	Browne 7'; Garner 15'; Brownhill 28'	Report	Doyle 31', 79', 90+1' (pen.)	Stadium: Deepdale; Attendance: 8,399 (433 away fans); Referee: Nigel Miller

20 September 2014 8	Doncaster Rovers	3–2	Chesterfield	Doncaster
15:00	Tyson 7'; Bennett 32'; McCombe 50' (yellow card) 63'		Clucas 42'; Raglan (yellow card) 52'; Doyle 61'	Stadium: Keepmoat Stadium; Attendance: 7,954; Referee: Tony Harrington

27 September 2014 9	Chesterfield	1–1	Notts County	Chesterfield
15:00	Banks (yellow card) 34'; Margreitter 62'; Clucas (yellow card) 90+7'	Report	Adams 15'; Cassidy (yellow card) 56'; Noble (yellow card) 80'; Smith (yellow card) 82'; Cranston (yellow card) 90+2'	Stadium: Proact Stadium; Attendance: 7,422 (1,222 away supporters); Referee: Andy Woolmer

4 October 2014 10	Chesterfield	3–2	Sheffield United	Chesterfield
13:00	Margreitter (yellow card) 18'; Ryan 26'; Lee (red card) 41'; Roberts 45'; Doyle 73'; Jones (yellow card) 90+2'	Report	Doyle (yellow card) 8'; Scougall (yellow card) 25'; Higdon (red card) 30'; McNulty 81'; Collins 90+2'	Stadium: Proact Stadium; Attendance: 9,723 (1,957 away supporters); Referee: Mark Brown

11 October 2014 11	Bristol City	3–2	Chesterfield	Bristol
15:00	Evatt 9' (o.g.); Williams 46'; Burns 90+3'	Report	Doyle 25', 59' (yellow card) 45'; Clucas (yellow card) 68'; Morsy (yellow card) 74'	Stadium: Ashton Gate; Attendance: 12,558; Referee: Andy Davies

18 October 2014 12	Chesterfield	1–1	Oldham Athletic	Chesterfield
15:00	Clucas 57'; Evatt (yellow card) 62'; Gardner (yellow card) 90+2'	Report	Wilson (yellow card) 9'; Poleon (yellow card) 33'; Forte 49' (pen.); Dieng (yellow card) 90+4'	Stadium: Proact Stadium; Attendance: 7,130; Referee: (England) Geoff Eltringham

21 October 2014 13	Colchester United	2–1	Chesterfield	Colchester
19:45	Gilbey (yellow card) 34'; Healey 50'; Sears 87'	Report	Clucas 1'; Morsy (yellow card) 74'	Stadium: Colchester Community Stadium; Attendance: 2,718; Referee: Darren Sheldrake

25 October 2014 14	Walsall	1–0	Chesterfield	Walsall
15:00	Bradshaw 61'	Report	Darikwa (yellow card) 77'; Evatt (yellow card) 89'	Stadium: Bescot Stadium; Attendance: 4,230; Referee: Kevin Wright

28 October 2014 15	Chesterfield	0–3	Swindon Town	Chesterfield
19:45	Jones (yellow card) 27'; Evatt (yellow card) 29'; Morsy (yellow card) 36'	Report	Kasim 30'; Byrne 34'; Williams 70'; Stephens (yellow card) 85'	Stadium: Proact Stadium; Attendance: 6,144; Referee: Scott Duncan

1 November 2014 16	Chesterfield	0–0	Yeovil Town	Chesterfield
15:00	Darikwa (yellow card) 15'; Lee (yellow card) 86'	Report		Stadium: Proact Stadium; Attendance: 6,462 (188 away supporters); Referee: Oliver Langford

15 November 2014 17	Crewe Alexandra	0–0	Chesterfield	Crewe
15:00	Turton (yellow card) 80'	BBC Report	Evatt (yellow card) 22'; Morsy (yellow card) 45'	Stadium: Gresty Road; Attendance: 4,557; Referee: Chris Kavanagh

22 November 2014 18	Chesterfield	2–1	Barnsley	Chesterfield
15:00	Doyle 42', 58' (yellow card) 89'; Darikwa (yellow card) 49'	Report	Hourihane (yellow card) 47'; Treacy 85'	Stadium: Proact Stadium; Attendance: 8,544; Referee: Andre Marriner

29 November 2014 19	Crawley Town	1–1	Chesterfield	Crawley
15:00	Smith (yellow card) 21'; Tomlin 70'; McLeod (red card) 90+1'	Report	Darikwa (yellow card) 19'; Roberts 59' (yellow card) 59'; Jones (red card) 90+2'	Stadium: Broadfield Stadium; Attendance: 2,459; Referee: Graham Horwood

13 December 2014 20	Chesterfield	0–1	Bradford City	Chesterfield
15:00	Morsy (red card) 48'; Roberts (yellow card) 86'	Report	Halliday (yellow card) 52'; Clarke 57' (yellow card) 80'; Davies (yellow card) 74'; Pickford (yellow card) 90+5'	Stadium: Proact Stadium; Attendance: 6,809; Referee: Eddie Ilderton

20 December 2014 21	Gillingham	2–3	Chesterfield	Gillingham
15:00 GMT	McDonald 59'; Egan 61'; Ehmer (yellow card) 70'	Report	Clucas 22'; Legge 54' (o.g.); Ryan 69'	Stadium: Priestfield Stadium; Attendance: 6,841; Referee: Chris Sarginson

26 December 2014 22	Chesterfield	3–2	Peterborough United	Chesterfield
15:00 GMT	Doyle 10' 54' (yellow card) 79'; Gnanduillet 34'; Raglan (yellow card) 47'; Humphreys (yellow card) 77'; Banks (yellow card) 77'	Report	Bostwick 62'; Burgess (yellow card) 66'; Maddison 71'; Mendez-Laing (yellow card) 87'	Stadium: Proact Stadium; Attendance: 8,353; Referee: David Coote

28 December 2014 23	Coventry City	0–0	Chesterfield	Coventry
15:00	Jackson (yellow card) 20'; Martin (yellow card) 40'; Fleck (yellow card) 60'	Report	Gnanduillet (yellow card) 40'; Boco (yellow card) 59'	Stadium: Ricoh Arena; Attendance: 10,166; Referee: Darren Handley

10 January 2015 24	Chesterfield	3–0	Port Vale	Chesterfield
15:00	Gnanduillet 13'; Doyle 60' (pen.); Raglan 70'; Hird (yellow card) 90+4'	Report	Brown (yellow card) 32'; Dickinson (yellow card) 40'; O'Conor (yellow card) 55'; Veseli (yellow card) 60'	Stadium: Proact Stadium; Attendance: 7,034; Referee: (England) Darren Bond

17 January 2015 25	Swindon Town	3–1	Chesterfield	Swindon
15:00	Stephens 17'; Swift 25'; Williams 47'	Report	Clucas 22'; Doyle (yellow card) 45+2'; Raglan (yellow card) 77'	Stadium: County Ground; Attendance: 7,981; Referee: (England) Nigel Miller

27 January 2015 26	Chesterfield	3–0	Crawley Town	Chesterfield
19:45	Doyle 34', 53'; O'Shea 51'	Report		Stadium: Proact Stadium; Attendance: 5,329; Referee: Stuart Attwell

31 January 2015 27	Chesterfield	2–2	Doncaster Rovers	Chesterfield
15:00	O'Shea (yellow card) 32'; Doyle 43'; Morsy (yellow card) 74'; Ryan 87'	Report	Coppinger 3'; Butler 9'; Bennett (yellow card) 41'	Stadium: Proact Stadium; Attendance: 7,839; Referee: (England) Darren Deadman

7 February 2015 28	Notts County	0–1	Chesterfield	Nottingham
15:00	Hollis (yellow card) 9'; Thompson (yellow card) 45'	Report	Lavery 67'; Darikwa (yellow card) 80'; Hird (yellow card) 83'	Stadium: Meadow Lane; Attendance: 6,649; Referee: (England) Keith Stroud

10 February 2015 29	Chesterfield	0–2	Preston North End	Chesterfield
19:45	Hird (red card) 3'; Ryan (yellow card) 43'; O'Shea (yellow card) 90'	Report	Johnson (yellow card) 23'; Garner 30', 79'; Gallagher (yellow card) 90+3'	Stadium: Proact Stadium; Attendance: 6,309; Referee: Peter Bankes

14 February 2015 30	Chesterfield	2–3	Leyton Orient	Chesterfield
15:00	O'Shea 19' (pen.); Evatt (yellow card) 33'; Omozusi 54' (o.g.)	Report	Mooney 35', 70'; Cox 90+11'	Stadium: Proact Stadium; Attendance: 6,524; Referee: Tim Robinson

17 February 2015 31	Scunthorpe United	2–0	Chesterfield	Scunthorpe
19:45	Canavan 58'; Madden 87'	Report	Morsy (yellow card) 80'; O'Shea (yellow card) 90'	Stadium: Glanford Park; Attendance: 3,601; Referee: Eddie Ilderton

21 February 2015 32	Rochdale	1–0	Chesterfield	Rochdale
15:00	Hery (yellow card) 54'; Henderson 65'	Report	Gnanduillet (yellow card) 73'; Ryan (yellow card) 80'	Stadium: Spotland Stadium; Attendance: 2,967; Referee: (England) David Coote

28 February 2015 33	Chesterfield	3–0	Fleetwood Town	Chesterfield
15:00	Lavery 31'; Hird 42'; Morsy 63'	Report	McLaughlin (yellow card) 12'; Roberts (yellow card) 17'; Sarcevic (yellow card) 44' (yellow-red card); Hughes (yellow card) 52'; Jordan (yellow card) 67'; Evans (yellow card) 90+5'	Stadium: Proact Stadium; Attendance: 6,497; Referee: (England) Patrick Miller

3 March 2015 34	Milton Keynes Dons	1–2	Chesterfield	Milton Keynes
19:45	Spence (yellow card) 26'; Baker 28'; Lewington (yellow card) 63' (yellow-red card)	Report	Roberts (yellow card) 16' (goal) 66'; Morsy (yellow card) 24'; Lavery 90'	Stadium: Stadium mk Attendance: 7,335; Referee: (England) Chris Sarginson

14 March 2015 35	Chesterfield	2–3	Coventry City	Chesterfield
15:00	O'Shea 42'; Ariyibi 85'	Report	Tudgay 9'; Odelusi 65'; Nouble 75'	Stadium: Proact Stadium; Attendance: 7,205; Referee: (England) Dean Whitestone

17 March 2015 36	Chesterfield	3–0	Gillingham	Chesterfield
19:45	Clucas 3' 88'; O'Shea 12'; Darikwa (yellow card) 52'	Report	Dack (yellow card) 39'; Hessenthaler (yellow card) 60'	Stadium: Proact Stadium; Attendance: 4,804; Referee: (England) Gary Sutton

21 March 2015 37	Peterborough United	1–0	Chesterfield	Peterborough
15:00	Bostwick 27'; Ricardo Almeida Santos (yellow card) 59' (yellow-red card); Newell (yellow card) 83'	Report		Stadium: London Road Stadium; Attendance: 6,612; Referee: (England) Rob Lewis

28 March 2015 38	Chesterfield	1–0	Walsall	Chesterfield
15:00	Ryan (yellow card) 52'; Hird 86'	Report		Stadium: Proact Stadium; Attendance: 6,358; Referee: (England) Kevin Friend

31 March 2015 39	Bradford City	0–1	Chesterfield	Bradford
19:45	Zoko (yellow card) 88'	Report	Harrison 45+1'; Ryan (yellow card) 56'; Darikwa (yellow card) 59'; Clucas (yellow card) 76'; Dieseruvwe (yellow card) 79'; Morsy (yellow card) 87'	Stadium: Valley Parade; Attendance: 12,551; Referee: (England) Jeremy Simpson

3 April 2015 40	Yeovil Town	2–3	Chesterfield	Yeovil
15:00	Hayter 18'; Foley 57'; Berrett (yellow card) 82'; Grant (yellow card) 88'	Report	Hird 59'; O'Shea 66' 69' (yellow card) 70'; Clucas (yellow card) 90+3'	Stadium: Huish Park; Attendance: 4,520; Referee: (England) James Linington

6 April 2015 41	Chesterfield	1–0	Crewe Alexandra	Chesterfield
15:00	Darikwa 26'	Report	Ness (yellow card) 42'; Jones (yellow card) 54'	Stadium: Proact Stadium; Attendance: 6,942; Referee: (England) Kevin Johnson

11 April 2015 42	Barnsley	1–1	Chesterfield	Barnsley
15:00	Winnall 62' (yellow card) 78'	Report	O'Shea 26'	Stadium: Oakwell; Attendance: 11,268; Referee: (England) Geoff Eltringham

14 April 2015 43	Chesterfield	6–0	Colchester United	Chesterfield
19:45	Roberts 6' 84' (pen.); Clucas 16' 17'; Gardner 58'; Ryan 60'	Report		Stadium: Proact Stadium; Attendance: 6,508; Referee: (England) Simon Hooper

18 April 2015 44	Oldham Athletic	0–0	Chesterfield	Oldham
15:00	Dieng (yellow card) 90+4'	Report	Evatt (yellow card) 77'	Stadium: Boundary Park; Attendance: 4,557; Referee: (England) Graham Horwood

25 April 2015 45	Chesterfield	0–2	Bristol City	Chesterfield
15:00	Roberts (yellow card) 86'; Morsy (yellow card) 88'	Report	Agard 31'; Flint 59'; Elliott (yellow card) 90+3'	Stadium: Proact Stadium; Attendance: 9,615; Referee: (England) Peter Bankes

3 May 2015 46	Sheffield United	1–1	Chesterfield	Sheffield
12:15	McNulty 34'; Harris (yellow card) 58'	Report	Evatt 51'; Jones (yellow card) 70'; Roberts (yellow card) 90+4'	Stadium: Bramall Lane; Attendance: 26,078; Referee: (England) Kevin Wright

=== Play Offs ===
7 May 2015 Leg 1	Chesterfield	0–1	Preston North End	Chesterfield
19:45	Ryan (yellow card) 49'	Report	Beckford 6'; Gallagher (yellow card) 48'	Stadium: Proact Stadium; Attendance: 8,409; Referee: (England) Mark Haywood

10 May 2015 Leg 2	Preston North End	3–0 (4–0 agg.)	Chesterfield	Preston, Lancashire
12:15	Garner (yellow card) 24' (goal) 62' (pen.); Beckford 38' 87' (yellow card) 43'; Clarke (yellow card) 66'	Report	Evatt (yellow card) 29'	Stadium: Deepdale; Attendance: 15,641; Referee: (England) Andy D'Urso

=== FA Cup ===
The draw for the first round of the FA Cup was made on 27 October 2014.

9 November 2014 First round	Braintree Town	0–6	Chesterfield	Braintree
14:00		BBC Report	Doyle 21', 90+3'; O'Shea 30'; Evatt (yellow card) 44'; Clucas 45+1'; Roberts 53'; Clerima 75' (o.g.)	Stadium: Cressing Road; Attendance: 1,206; Referee: Brendan Malone

6 December 2014 Second round	Milton Keynes Dons	0–1	Chesterfield	Milton Keynes
15:00	Alli (yellow card) 90+4'	Report	Margreitter (yellow card) 25'; Gnanduillet 53'	Stadium: Stadium mk Attendance: 5,591; Referee: Keith Stroud
Note: Result was voided and match ordered to be replayed by the Football Association after Chesterfield fielded an ineligible player.

2 January 2015 Second round	Milton Keynes Dons	0–1	Chesterfield	Milton Keynes
19:45	Bowditch (yellow card) 48'; Reeves (yellow card) 73'; Carruthers (yellow card) 90+5'	Report	Roberts 43' (yellow card) 83'; Gnanduillet (yellow card) 53'; Morsy (yellow card) 57'	Stadium: Stadium mk Attendance: 8,040; Referee: (England) Stephen Matin

6 January 2015 Third round	Scunthorpe United	2–2	Chesterfield	Scunthorpe
19:45	Davey 18'; Bishop (yellow card) 38'; Taylor 44'; Miguel Llera (yellow card) 57'; McSheffrey (yellow card) 80'	Report	Doyle 71' (pen.); O'Shea 85' (yellow card) 87'; Gardner (yellow card) 90+1'; Clucas (yellow card) 90+2'	Stadium: Glanford Park; Attendance: 4,307; Referee: (England) Mark Haywood

13 January 2015 Third round replay	Chesterfield	2–0 (a.e.t.)	Scunthorpe United	Chesterfield
19:45	Morsy (yellow card) 84'; Clucas 105', 116'	Report	Nolan (yellow card) 35'; Boyce (yellow card) 41'; Sparrow (yellow card) 109'	Stadium: Proact Stadium; Attendance: 6,815; Referee: Keith Hill

24 January 2015 Fourth round	Derby County	2–0	Chesterfield	Derby
15:00	Bent 20'; Christie (yellow card) 80'; Hughes 82' (yellow card) 90+5'	Report		Stadium: IPro Stadium; Attendance: 28,392; Referee: (England) David Webb

=== League Cup ===
The draw for the first round was made on 17 June 2014 at 10am. Chesterfield were drawn at home to Huddersfield Town.

12 August 2014 Round One	Chesterfield	3–5 (a.e.t.)	Huddersfield Town	Chesterfield
19:45	Humphreys 32'; Banks 45+1'; Doyle 71'	Report	Wells 58', 84' (pen.), 94'; Stead 90+2'; Lolley 98'	Stadium: Proact Stadium; Referee: Gary Sutton

=== Football League Trophy ===
2 September 2014 Round One	Scunthorpe United	2–0	Chesterfield	Scunthorpe
19:45	McAllister 15'; McSheffrey 25'	Report	Broadhead (red card) 84'	Stadium: Glanford Park; Attendance: 2,004; Referee: Darren Handley

== Transfers ==
=== In ===
Date	Pos.	Name	From	Fee	Source
8 April 2014	DF	(England) Charlie Raglan	(England) FC United of Manchester	Free	
15 May 2014	DF	(England) Daniel Jones	(England) Port Vale	Free	
20 May 2014	FW	(England) Charlie Dawes	(England) Sheffield Wednesday	Free	
31 July 2014	MF	(England) Michael Onovwigun	(England) Brentford	Free	
8 August 2014	MF	(Benin) Romuald Boco	(England) Plymouth Argyle	Free	
29 August 2014	MF	(United States) Gboly Ariyibi	(England) Leeds United	Free	
1 September 2014	MF	(England) Sam Clucas	(England) Mansfield Town	Undisclosed	
12 September 2014	FW	(England) Carl Lamb	(Wales) Aberystwyth Town	Free	
27 January 2015	FW	(England) Byron Harrison	(England) Cheltenham Town	Undisclosed	
2 February 2015	FW	(England) Emmanuel Dieseruvwe	(England) Sheffield Wednesday	Undisclosed	

=== Out ===
Date	Pos.	Player	To	Fee	Source
13 May 2014	DF	(England) Matthew Brown	(England) Chester	Free	
13 May 2014	MF	(Republic of Ireland) Jamie Devitt	(England) Morecambe	Free	
13 May 2014	FW	(England) Jacob Hazel	(England) FC United of Manchester	Free	
13 May 2014	MF	(England) Sam Togwell	(England) Barnet	Free	
14 May 2014	FW	(England) Marc Richards	(England) Northampton Town	Free	
21 May 2014	DF	(Jamaica) Nathan Smith	(England) Yeovil Town	Free	
13 August 2014	DF	(England) Liam Cooper	(England) Leeds United	Undisclosed	
20 January 2015	MF	(Benin) Romuald Boco	(India) Bharat	Free	
2 February 2015	FW	(Republic of Ireland) Eoin Doyle	(Wales) Cardiff City	Undisclosed	

=== Loans in ===
Date	Pos.	Name	From	End date	Source
8 August 2014	MF	(Jamaica) Daniel Johnson	(England) Aston Villa	31 October 2014	
11 September 2014	DF	(Austria) Georg Margreitter	(England) Wolverhampton Wanderers	13 December 2014	
18 October 2014	GK	(England) Connor Hunt	(England) Everton	15 November 2014	
23 October 2014	MF	(England) Oscar Gobern	(England) Huddersfield Town	13 November 2014	
3 January 2015	FW	(England) Emmanuel Dieseruvwe	(England) Sheffield Wednesday	7 February 2015	
2 February 2015	MF	(England) Mark Duffy	(England) Birmingham City	2 March 2015	
2 February 2015	DF	(England) Ashley Carter	(England) Wolverhampton Wanderers	2 March 2015	
2 February 2015	MF	(Northern Ireland) Caolan Lavery	(England) Sheffield Wednesday	15 March 2015	
26 March 2015	GK	(England) Jonathan Flatt	(England) Wolverhampton Wanderers	23 April 2015	

=== Loans out ===
Date	Pos.	Name	To	End date	Source
23 September 2014	GK	(England) Aaron Chapman	(England) Accrington Stanley	19 November 2014	
20 October 2014	FW	(Ivory Coast) Armand Gnanduillet	(England) Tranmere Rovers	17 November 2014	
27 November 2014	MF	(England) Ollie Banks	(England) Northampton Town	23 December 2014	
30 January 2015	DF	(England) Drew Talbot	(England) Plymouth Argyle	3 May 2015	
6 February 2015	FW	(England) Charlie Dawes	(England) Stalybridge Celtic	7 March 2015	
6 February 2015	MF	(England) Michael Onovwigun	(England) Stalybridge Celtic	7 March 2015	
2 March 2015	FW	(Ivory Coast) Armand Gnanduillet	(England) Oxford United	30 June 2015	
3 March 2015	MF	(England) Dan Gardner	(England) Tranmere Rovers	5 April 2015	

== See also ==
- List of Chesterfield F.C. seasons
