= 2013–14 Chesterfield F.C. season =

Chesterfield F.C.
2013–14 season
- Chairman: Dave Allen
- Manager: Paul Cook
- Stadium: Proact Stadium
- League Two: 1st (champions)
- FA Cup: Second round
- League Cup: First round
- Football League Trophy: Runners-up
- Top goalscorer: League: Eoin Doyle, Gary Roberts (11); All: Eoin Doyle (13)
Home colours	Away colours

The 2013–14 season was Chesterfield's second in League Two following relegation in 2012, and manager Paul Cook's first full season in charge. After spending most of the season near the top of the table, Chesterfield were crowned League Two champions on the final day, to claim the League Two title for a record fourth time, and to seal their return to the third tier after a two-year absence.

== Players ==
=== Current squad ===
As of 3 May 2014.

Note: Flags indicate national team as defined under FIFA eligibility rules; some limited exceptions apply. Players may hold more than one non-FIFA nationality.

No.	Pos.	Nation	Player
1	GK	ENG	Tommy Lee
2	MF	ENG	Ollie Banks
3	DF	JAM	Nathan Smith
4	DF	ENG	Sam Hird
5	MF	EGY	Sam Morsy
6	DF	SCO	Liam Cooper
7	MF	ZIM	Tendayi Darikwa
8	MF	ENG	Sam Togwell
9	FW	ENG	Marc Richards
10	MF	IRL	Jay O'Shea
11	MF	ENG	Gary Roberts
12	MF	IRL	Jimmy Ryan

No.	Pos.	Nation	Player
15	DF	ENG	Ritchie Humphreys
16	MF	IRL	Jamie Devitt
17	FW	IRL	Eoin Doyle
18	DF	ENG	Jack Broadhead
19	FW	ENG	Jacob Hazel
20	GK	ENG	Aaron Chapman
21	FW	CIV	Armand Gnanduillet
22	DF	ENG	Matthew Brown
23	DF	ENG	Ian Evatt (captain)
25	DF	ENG	Drew Talbot
26	FW	ENG	Dan Gardner
44	FW	ENG	Jake Beesley

=== Out on loan ===
Note: Flags indicate national team as defined under FIFA eligibility rules; some limited exceptions apply. Players may hold more than one non-FIFA nationality.

No.	Pos.	Nation	Player

== Transfers ==
=== In ===
Date	Pos.	Player	From	Fee	Ref.
30 June 2013	MF	Sam Morsy (EGY)	Port Vale	Undisclosed	
1 July 2013	GK	Aaron Chapman (ENG)	(Belper Town)	Free transfer	
1 July 2013	FW	Eoin Doyle (IRL)	(Hibernian)	Free transfer	
1 July 2013	MF	Jimmy Ryan (IRL)	(Scunthorpe United)	Free transfer	
1 July 2013	MF	Gary Roberts (ENG)	(Swindon Town)	Free transfer	
15 July 2013	DF	Ritchie Humphreys (ENG)	(Hartlepool United)	Free transfer	
17 July 2013	DF	Matty Brown (ENG)	Marine	Free transfer	
19 July 2013	MF	Jamie Devitt (IRL)	(Hull City)	Free transfer	
30 July 2013	DF	Ian Evatt (ENG)	(Blackpool)	Free transfer	
13 September 2013	FW	Gary McSheffrey (ENG)	(Coventry City)	Free transfer	
16 September 2013	MF	Ollie Banks (ENG)	FC United of Manchester	Undisclosed	
4 January 2014	FW	Dan Gardner (ENG)	Halifax Town	Undisclosed	

† Brackets around club names denote the player's contract with that club had expired before he joined Chesterfield.

=== Loans in ===
Date from	Pos.	Player	From	Duration	Ref.
24 July 2013	DF	Ryan Edwards (ENG)	Blackburn Rovers	24 October 2013	
4 October 2013	FW	Chris Porter (ENG)	Sheffield United	28 days	
22 November 2013	MF	Callum McFadzean (ENG)	Sheffield United	Until 4 January 2014	
2 January 2014	GK	Ian Dunbavin (ENG)	Accrington Stanley	Until end of season	
11 March 2014	MF	Daniel Kearns (IRL)	Peterborough United	Until end of season	
13 March 2014	FW	Mason Bennett (ENG)	Derby County	Until 9 April 2014	

=== Out ===
Date	Pos.	Player	To	Fee	Ref.
30 June 2013	FW	Jack Lester (ENG)		Retired	
30 June 2013	DF	Richard Brindley (ENG)	(Rotherham United)	Free transfer	
30 June 2013	GK	Richard O'Donnell (ENG)	(Walsall)	Released	
30 June 2013	DF	Neal Trotman (ENG)	(Plymouth Argyle)	Released	
30 June 2013	MF	Craig Clay (ENG)	(York City)	Released	
30 June 2013	MF	Danny Whitaker (ENG)	(Macclesfield Town)	Released	
30 June 2013	MF	Jack Waddle (ENG)	BK Sports (SWE)	Released	
30 June 2013	FW	Scott Boden (ENG)	(Macclesfield Town)	Released	
30 June 2013	FW	Jonathan Wafula (KEN)		Released	
30 June 2013	MF	Mark Randall (ENG)		Contract expired	
14 January 2014	FW	Gary McSheffrey (ENG)	(Scunthorpe United)	Free transfer	

† Brackets around club names denote the player joined that club after his Chesterfield contract expired.

=== Loans out ===
Date from	Pos.	Player	To	Duration	Ref.
8 July 2013	FW	Jacob Hazel (SKN)	SK Sprint-Jeløy (NOR)	Four months	
25 August 2013	DF	Jack Broadhead (ENG)	Buxton	17 November 2013	
25 October 2013	DF	Matty Brown (ENG)	Southport		
2 January 2014	DF	Jack Broadhead (ENG)	Worksop Town	Until 1 February 2014	
6 January 2014	FW	Jacob Hazel (SKN)	Buxton	One month	
22 January 2014	MF	Jamie Devitt (IRL)	Morecambe	Until end of season	
7 February 2014	GK	Aaron Chapman (ENG)	Chester	One month	
7 February 2014	DF	Matty Brown (ENG)	Chester	One month	
February 2014	FW	Jacob Hazel (SKN)	Bradford (Park Avenue)	Until 8 March 2014	
14 March 2014	MF	Sam Togwell (ENG)	Wycombe Wanderers	Until 10 April 2014	
19 March 2014	FW	Jacob Hazel (SKN)	FC United of Manchester	Until end of season	
26 March 2014	DF	Jack Broadhead (ENG)	Matlock Town	Until end of season	

== League table ==
Pos	Team	Pld	W	D	L	GF	GA	GD	Pts	Promotion, qualification or relegation
1	Chesterfield (C, P)	46	23	15	8	71	40	+31	84	Promotion to Football League One
2	Scunthorpe United (P)	46	20	21	5	68	44	+24	81	Promotion to Football League One
3	Rochdale (P)	46	24	9	13	69	48	+21	81	Promotion to Football League One
4	Fleetwood Town (O, P)	46	22	10	14	66	52	+14	76	Qualification for League Two play-offs
5	Southend United	46	19	15	12	56	39	+17	72	Qualification for League Two play-offs

Updated to match(es) played on 3 May 2014. Source: BBC Sport
Rules for classification: 1) Points; 2) Goal difference; 3) Number of goals scored
(C) Champions; (O) Play-off winners; (P) Promoted

== Results ==
=== Pre-season ===
6 July 2013	Buxton	0–3	Chesterfield	The Silverlands
15:00			Gnanduillet 43'; Ryan 54'; Doyle 65'

13 July 2013	Chesterfield	2–1	Huddersfield Town	Proact Stadium
15:00	Roberts 9'; Devitt 63'	Report	Ward 11'

16 July 2013	Chesterfield	1–1	Nottingham Forest	Proact Stadium
19:30	Roberts 78'	Report	Halford 17'	Attendance: 3,534

17 July 2013	Belper Town	1–1	Chesterfield	Christchurch Meadow
19:30	15'		33'

20 July 2013	Southport	2–1	Chesterfield	Merseyrail Community Stadium
15:00	Hattersley 25' (pen.); Almond 66'		Richards 20' (pen.)

23 July 2013	Chesterfield	1–2	Wolverhampton Wanderers	Proact Stadium
19:45	Talbot 28'		Edwards 6'; Griffiths 64'

27 July 2013	Chesterfield	1–1	Sheffield Wednesday	Proact Stadium
15:00	Bencherif 29'		Maguire 90'

=== League Two ===
3 August 2013 1	Bury	0–2	Chesterfield	Gigg Lane
15:00			O'Shea 50'; Richards 66'	Attendance: 4337

10 August 2013 2	Chesterfield	2–0	Cheltenham Town	Proact Stadium
15:00	Roberts 23'; Doyle 89'			Attendance: 5367

17 August 2013 3	Rochdale	2–2	Chesterfield	Spotland Stadium
15:00	Tutte 31' pen. Hogan 51'		Richards 19'; Roberts 65'	Attendance: 2899

24 August 2013 4	Chesterfield	2–1	Southend United	Proact Stadium
15:00	Roberts 59'; Gnanduillet 90+4'		Eastwood 68'	Attendance: 5579

31 August 2013 5	Portsmouth	0–2	Chesterfield	Fratton Park
15:00			Gnanduillet 87'; Darikwa 90+3'	Attendance: 15999

7 September 2013 6	Chesterfield	1–0	Accrington Stanley	Proact Stadium
15:00	Darikwa 47'			Attendance: 6588

14 September 2013 7	Chesterfield	2–0	AFC Wimbledon	Proact Stadium
15:00	Roberts 30'; Hird 53'			Attendance: 6353

21 September 2013 8	Oxford United	0–1	Chesterfield	Kassam Stadium
15:00			Humphreys 30'	Attendance: 7187

28 September 2013 9	Chesterfield	0–1	Mansfield Town	Proact Stadium
13:00			Andrew 37'

5 October 2013 10	Morecambe	4–3	Chesterfield	Globe Arena
15:00	Ellison 47'; Hughes 62'; Sampson 71'; Amond 86'		Doyle 5', 23'; McSheffrey 11'	Attendance: 2204

12 October 2013 11	Fleetwood Town	1–1	Chesterfield	Highbury Stadium
15:00	Parkin 89'		Cooper 54'

19 October 2013 12	Chesterfield	0–2	Burton Albion	Proact Stadium
15:00			McGurk 10', 14'

22 October 2013 13	Chesterfield	2–2	York City	Proact Stadium
15:00	Gnanduillet (64 .pen); O'Shea 76'		O'Neill 35'; Jarvis 61'

26 October 2013 14	Bristol Rovers	0–0	Chesterfield	Memorial Stadium
15:00

2 November 2013 15	Chesterfield	1–1	Scunthorpe United	Proact Stadium
15:00	Richards 9'		Waterfall 88'

16 November 2013 16	Torquay United	0–2	Chesterfield	Plainmoor
15:00			Banks 15'; O'Shea 19'	Attendance: 2361

23 November 2013 17	Chesterfield	2–0	Wycombe Wanderers	Proact Stadium
15:00	Banks 31'; Gnanduillet 45+1'			Attendance: 5798

26 November 2013 18	Chesterfield	0–0	Northampton Town	Proact Stadium
19:45				Attendance: 5321

1 December 2013 19	Newport County	3–2	Chesterfield	Rodney Parade
13:00			Ryan 61'; Richards 90+1'	Attendance: 3378

14 December 2013 20	Chesterfield	2–0	Plymouth Argyle	Proact Stadium
15:00	Brown 9'; Richards 42' (pen.)			Attendance: 5486

20 December 2013 21	Exeter City	0–2	Chesterfield	St James Park
19:45			Banks 48'; Richards 70'	Attendance: 3449

26 December 2013 22	Chesterfield	1–1	Hartlepool United	Proact Stadium
15:00	Darikwa 31'		Dolan (48 .pen)	Attendance: 7680

29 December 2013 23	Chesterfield	1–1	Dagenham & Redbridge	Proact Stadium
15:00	Richards 49'		Ogogo 58'	Attendance: 5906

11 January 2014 24	Chesterfield	4–0	Bury	Proact Stadium
15:00	Roberts 16'; O'Shea 65'; Richards 76'; Gardner 86'			Attendance: 5906

18 January 2014 25	Southend United	3–0	Chesterfield	Roots Hall
15:00	Hurst 28'; Leonard 59'; Corr 61'			Attendance: 6256

21 January 2014 26	Chesterfield	2–2	Rochdale	Proact Stadium
19:45	Roberts 40'; Richards 70'		Henderson 90+2'; Vincenti 90+3'	Attendance: 5078

25 January 2014 27	Northampton Town	1–3	Chesterfield	Sixfields Stadium
15:00	Carter 15'		Gardner 25'; Roberts 53'; Gnanduillet 87'	Attendance: 5082

28 January 2014 28	York City	0–2	Chesterfield	Bootham Crescent
19:45			Doyle 2'; Roberts 39'	Attendance: 5082

1 February 2014 29	Chesterfield	3–1	Bristol Rovers	Proact Stadium
15:00	Morsy 5'; Banks 44'; Doyle 47'		Brown 36'	Attendance: 6048

8 February 2014 30	Scunthorpe United	1–1	Chesterfield	Glanford Park
15:00	Winnall 15'; McAllister (yellow card) 33'		Doyle 45+1' (pen.); Ryan (yellow card) 64'	Attendance: 6,131

15 February 2014 31	Chesterfield	3–1	Torquay United	Proact Stadium
15:00	Banks (yellow card) 42'; Doyle 56'; O'Shea 80', 90+4'		Goodwin 50'; Stockley (yellow card) 73'; Wilkinson (yellow card) 90+1'	Attendance: 5,912

22 February 2014 32	Wycombe Wanderers	1–0	Chesterfield	Adams Park
15:00	Lewis (yellow card) 25'; Kretzschmar 35' (pen.); McClure (yellow card) 45'		Doyle (yellow card) 55'; Darikwa (yellow card) 90+5'	Attendance: 3,356

25 February 2014 33	Cheltenham Town	1–4	Chesterfield	Whaddon Road
19:45	Harrison 57'		Gardner 22'; Doyle 23'; Banks 26'; Cooper 29'	Attendance: 2,317

3 March 2014 34	Chesterfield	0–0	Portsmouth	Proact Stadium
19:45				Attendance: 5,807

8 March 2014 35	Accrington Stanley	3–1	Chesterfield	Crown Ground
15:00	Molyneux 4', 9', 45+7'; Murphy (yellow card) 25' (yellow-red card); Hatfield (yellow card) 48'; Joyce (yellow card) 62'		Evatt 85'	Attendance: 1,968

11 March 2014 36	AFC Wimbledon	1–1	Chesterfield	Kingsmeadow
19:45	Francomb 50' (yellow card) 52'; Morris (yellow card) 80'		Doyle (yellow card) 41'; Banks 55'	Attendance: 3,424

15 March 2014 37	Chesterfield	3–0	Oxford United	Proact Stadium
15:00	Banks 8' (yellow card) 72'; Roberts 16' (pen.) 90+3' (yellow card) 39'; Humphreys (yellow card) 61'		Mullins (yellow card) 14'; Raynes (yellow card) 52' (yellow-red card); Newey (red card) 81'	Attendance: 6,246

18 March 2014 38	Plymouth Argyle	2–1	Chesterfield	Home Park
19:45	Reid 28', 58'		Humphreys 57'; Cooper (yellow card) 61'; Bennett (yellow card) 87'	Attendance: 6,012

22 March 2014 39	Mansfield Town	0–0	Chesterfield	Field Mill
13:00	Dempster (yellow card) 31'; Murray (yellow card) 62'; Tafazolli (yellow card) 86'			Attendance: 5,931

25 March 2014 40	Chesterfield	1–0	Morecambe	Proact Stadium
19:45	O'Shea 19'; Ryan (yellow card) 88'		Ellison (yellow card) 80'; Edwards (yellow card) 85'; Kenyon (yellow card) 90+3'	Attendance: 4,891

5 April 2014 41	Chesterfield	1–1	Newport County	Proact Stadium
15:00	Ryan 49' (yellow card) 88'	Report	Porter 83'	Attendance: 5,659

12 April 2014 42	Hartlepool United	1–2	Chesterfield	Victoria Park
15:07	James 24'; Walker (yellow card) 28'	Report	Evatt (yellow card) 26'; Cooper 30'; Doyle 49'	Attendance: 3,778

18 April 2014 43	Chesterfield	1–1	Exeter City	Proact Stadium
15:00	Evatt (yellow card) 59'; Morsy (red card) 75'; Doyle 78' (pen.)	Report	Grimes 18'; Sercombe (yellow card) 79'	Attendance: 7,331

21 April 2014 44	Dagenham & Redbridge	0–1	Chesterfield	Lbbd stadium
15:00	D'Ath (yellow card) 66'	Report	Darikwa (yellow card) 24'; Doyle 28'; Smith (yellow card) 88'	Attendance: 1,801

27 April 2014 45	Burton Albion	0–2	Chesterfield	Pirelli Stadium
15:00		Report	O'Shea 52', 79'; Gnanduillet (yellow card) 81'	Attendance: 4,855

3 May 2014 46	Chesterfield	2–1	Fleetwood Town	Proact Stadium
15:00	Hird 51'; Roberts 55'; O'Shea (yellow card) 90'	Report	Blair 13'; Jordan (yellow card) 57'; Cresswell (yellow card) 90'	Attendance: 9,037

=== F.A. Cup ===
9 November 2013 1st Round	Chesterfield	2–0	Daventry Town	Proact Stadium
15:00	Roberts 69'; Ryan 88'			Attendance: 5269

7 December 2013 2nd Round	Chesterfield	1–3	Southend United	Proact Stadium
15:00	Darikwa 4'		Laird 12'; Straker 17'; Hurst 85'	Attendance: 4067

=== League Cup ===
7 August 2013 1st Round	Leeds United	2–1	Chesterfield	Elland Road
19:45	Brown 27'; Poleon 31'		Doyle 17'	Attendance: 17466

=== Football League Trophy ===
8 October 2013 2nd Round Northern Section	Mansfield Town	0–1	Chesterfield	Field Mill
19:45			McSheffery 71'

12 November 2013 3rd Round Northern Section	Chesterfield	3–0	Rochdale	Proact Stadium
19:45	Banks 45+2', 79'; Gnanduillet 73'			Attendance: 2897

10 December 2013 Semi-final Northern Section	Oldham Athletic	1–1 (5–6 p)	Chesterfield	Boundary Park
19:45	Philliskirk 21'		Darikwa 28'

4 February 2014 Final Northern Section 1st Leg	Fleetwood Town	1–3	Chesterfield	Highbury Stadium
19:45	Ball 45'		Evatt 21'; Morsy 24'; Ryan 65'	Attendance: 3508

18 February 2014 Final Northern Section 2nd Leg	Chesterfield	0–1 (3–2 agg.)	Fleetwood Town	Proact Stadium
19:45	Roberts (yellow card) 32'; Evatt (yellow card) 42'; Darikwa (yellow card) 48'; Morsy (yellow card) 89'		Evans (yellow card) 51'; Hughes (yellow card) 76'; Pond (yellow card) 90'; Parkin 90'	Attendance: 6,358

30 March 2014 Final	Chesterfield	1–3	Peterborough United	Wembley Stadium
19:45	Doyle 53'; Humphreys (yellow card) 63'; Roberts (yellow card) 70'; Darikwa (yellow card) 77'; Cooper (yellow card) 89'		McQuoid 7'; Brisley 38'; Newell (red card) 68'; Assombalonga 78' (pen.); Swanson (yellow card) 90'	Attendance: 35,663

== Statistics ==
As of 3 May 2014.

- Italics indicate loan player.
- Asterisk (*) indicates player left club midseason.

=== Appearances ===
No.	Pos	Nat	Player	Total		League One		FA Cup		League Cup		Football League Trophy	
No.	Pos	Nat	Player	Apps	Goals	Apps	Goals	Apps	Goals	Apps	Goals	Apps	Goals
1	GK	(England) ENG	Tommy Lee	55	0	46	0	2	0	1	0	6	0
2	MF	(England) ENG	Ollie Banks	33	9	23+2	7	2	0	0	0	4+2	2
3	DF	(Jamaica) JAM	Nathan Smith	15	0	12+2	0	0	0	1	0	0	0
4	DF	(England) ENG	Sam Hird	44	2	27+8	2	2	0	1	0	4+2	0
5	MF	(Egypt) EGY	Sam Morsy	39	2	34	1	0	0	1	0	4	1
6	DF	(Scotland) SCO	Liam Cooper	48	3	38+3	3	1	0	0	0	6	0
7	MF	(England) ENG	Tendayi Darikwa	50	5	32+9	3	1+1	1	1	0	4+2	1
8	MF	(England) ENG	Sam Togwell	10	0	5+5	0	0	0	0	0	0	0
9	FW	(England) ENG	Marc Richards	46	8	21+17	8	1+1	0	0+1	0	2+3	0
10	MF	(Republic of Ireland) IRL	Jay O'Shea	47	9	27+13	9	1+1	0	0+1	0	4	0
11	MF	(England) ENG	Gary Roberts	47	12	36+4	11	2	1	1	0	4	0
12	MF	(Republic of Ireland) IRL	Jimmy Ryan	48	4	39	2	2	1	1	0	6	1
15	DF	(England) ENG	Ritchie Humphreys	49	2	38+4	2	0+1	0	1	0	5	0
16	MF	(Republic of Ireland) IRL	Jamie Devitt	8	0	3+4	0	0	0	0	0	1	0
17	FW	(Republic of Ireland) IRL	Eoin Doyle	51	13	26+17	11	1+1	0	1	1	3+2	1
18	DF	(England) ENG	Jack Broadhead	0	0	0	0	0	0	0	0	0	0
19	FW	(England) ENG	Jacob Hazel	0	0	0	0	0	0	0	0	0	0
20	GK	(England) ENG	Aaron Chapman	0	0	0	0	0	0	0	0	0	0
21	FW	(Ivory Coast) CIV	Armand Gnanduillet	39	6	10+24	5	1+1	0	0+1	0	1+1	1
22	DF	(England) ENG	Matthew Brown	3	1	2+1	1	0	0	0	0	0	0
23	DF	(England) ENG	Ian Evatt	43	2	35	1	2	0	0	0	6	1
24	FW	(England) ENG	Chris Porter*	4	0	2+1	0	0	0	0	0	1	0
24	MF	(Scotland) SCO	Callum McFadzean*	5	0	2+2	0	1	0	0	0	0	0
25	DF	(England) ENG	Drew Talbot	31	0	24+1	0	2	0	1	0	2+1	0
26	MF	(England) ENG	Dan Gardner	17	3	11+5	3	0	0	0	0	1	0
27	DF	(England) ENG	Ryan Edwards*	7	0	4+1	0	0	0	1	0	1	0
28	FW	(England) ENG	Gary McSheffrey*	12	2	2+7	1	1	0	0	0	1+1	1
29	MF	(Northern Ireland) NIR	Daniel Kearns	10	0	6+4	0	0	0	0	0	0	0
30	FW	(England) ENG	Mason Bennett	6	0	1+4	0	0	0	0	0	0+1	0
33	GK	(England) ENG	Cameron Mason	0	0	0	0	0	0	0	0	0	0
35	GK	(England) ENG	Ian Dunbavin	0	0	0	0	0	0	0	0	0	0
44	FW	(England) ENG	Jake Beesley	0	0	0	0	0	0	0	0	0	0

=== Goalscorers ===
Rnk	Pos	Nat	Name	League Two	F.A. Cup	League Cup	Johnstone's Paint Trophy	Total
1	FW	(Republic of Ireland)	Eoin Doyle	11	0	1	1	13
2	MF	(England)	Gary Roberts	11	1	0	0	12
3	MF	(Republic of Ireland)	Jay O'Shea	9	0	0	0	9
=	MF	(England)	Ollie Banks	7	0	0	2	9
5	FW	(England)	Marc Richards	8	0	0	0	8
6	FW	(Ivory Coast)	Armand Gnanduillet	5	0	0	1	6
7	MF	(England)	Tendayi Darikwa	3	1	0	1	5
8	MF	(Republic of Ireland)	Jimmy Ryan	2	1	0	1	4
9	DF	(England)	Liam Cooper	3	0	0	0	3
=	MF	(England)	Dan Gardner	3	0	0	0	3
11	DF	(England)	Sam Hird	2	0	0	0	2
=	DF	(England)	Ritchie Humphreys	2	0	0	0	2
=	DF	(England)	Ian Evatt	1	0	0	1	2
=	FW	(England)	Gary McSheffrey	1	0	0	1	2
=	MF	(Egypt)	Sam Morsy	1	0	0	1	2
16	DF	(England)	Matthew Brown	1	0	0	0	1
Own goals				1	0	0	0	1
Total				71	3	1	9	84
