= 1990–91 Football League =

92nd season of the Football League

The Football League
- Season: 1990–91
- Champions: Arsenal
- New club in League: Darlington

The 1990–91 season was the 92nd completed season of The Football League.

== Final league tables and results ==
The tables and results below are reproduced here in the exact form that they can be found at The Rec.Sport.Soccer Statistics Foundation, with home and away statistics separated.

== First Division ==
First Division
- Season: 1990–91
- Champions: Arsenal; 10th English title
- Relegated: Sunderland; Derby County
- European Cup: Arsenal
- Cup Winners' Cup: Manchester United; Tottenham Hotspur
- UEFA Cup: Liverpool
- Matches: 380
- Goals: 1,049 (2.76 per match)
- Top goalscorer: Alan Smith (22 goals)
- Biggest home win: Nottingham Forest 7–0 Chelsea (20 April 1991)
- Biggest away win: Derby County 1–7 Liverpool (23 March 1991)
- Highest scoring: Derby County 4–6 Chelsea (15 December 1990)
- Longest winning run: 8 matches Liverpool
- Longest unbeaten run: 23 matches Arsenal
- Longest losing run: 8 matches Queens Park Rangers

The First Division title was won for the second time in three seasons by Arsenal, who lost just one league game all season and managed to overcome disappointments including having two points deducted for a player brawl in a league match in October, a 6-2 home defeat to Manchester United in a League Cup tie in November, and missing captain Tony Adams for two months of the season while he served a prison sentence for a motoring offence. Their only major rivals in the title race were Liverpool, who had looked set to retain the title after winning their opening eight games and remaining unbeaten in the league until December, only for their form to suffer and for manager Kenny Dalglish to suddenly announce his resignation as manager before the end of February. Long-serving coach Ronnie Moran was placed in temporary charge, with former captain Graeme Souness returning to Anfield as manager just before the Reds surrendered their defence of the league title to Arsenal. The Reds were readmitted to European competitions after a six-year ban and qualified for the 1991-92 UEFA Cup.

Crystal Palace finished third in the league to record their highest ever final position, although they were denied the chance to compete in Europe due to UEFA's decision to award only one place in the UEFA Cup to England for 1991-92. Newly promoted Leeds United finished fourth, Manchester City achieved their highest final position for more than a decade by finishing fifth, and Manchester United progressed seven places on their 1990 finish by occupying sixth place in the table, reserving their best form for the cup competitions, where they won the European Cup Winners' Cup and were runners-up in the Football League Cup. Tottenham Hotspur, who were unbeaten in the league until November before a shortage of wins for the rest of the season dragged them down to 10th, finished the season as FA Cup winners for a record eighth time. The season was followed by a dramatic takeover deal by computer tycoon Alan Sugar, who took control of the club, cleared debts exceeding £20million, and installed manager Terry Venables as chief executive, although a fresh shadow hung over the club after star midfielder Paul Gascoigne was left facing a long spell on the sidelines after suffering a serious knee injury in the FA Cup final, following weeks of speculation that he was on the verge of a multi-million pound transfer to Lazio in Italy.

The season saw several managerial changes as well as the changeover at Liverpool. Everton sacked manager Colin Harvey at the end of October and brought Howard Kendall back to Goodison Park from Manchester City, who replaced him with 34-year-old midfielder Peter Reid as player-manager. On the same day that Reid took charge at Maine Road, Coventry City completed a £350,000 move which took England defender Terry Butcher to the midlands club as successor to John Sillett, with 31-year-old Butcher being the youngest manager in the Football League. Aston Villa had lost manager Graham Taylor to the England team before the season began, and appointed Czech coach Jozef Venglos as his successor. Venglos, the first foreign manager in the First Division, inherited a side which had just finished runners-up in the First Division, but saw them slump to finish 17th and then resigned to be succeeded by Ron Atkinson. The end of the season saw Queens Park Rangers sack manager Don Howe after 18 months in charge and bring former player Gerry Francis back to Loftus Road as manager. Despite keeping Luton Town up on the final day of the season, Luton Town manager Jimmy Ryan was sacked by the Kenilworth Road board of directors, who appointed David Pleat as manager for the second time. Chris Nicholl's six-year spell as Southampton manager ended in dismissal and he was replaced by Ian Branfoot. Chelsea manager Bobby Campbell stood down to take on a new role as personal assistant to chairman Ken Bates, and Ian Porterfield was named as his successor. This season was also the last to feature all ‘Big Five’ clubs in the top-half of the league until the 1995-96 Premier League season.

The expansion of the First Division to 22 clubs for the 1991-92 season meant that just two teams went down to the Second Division. Derby County, who made a satisfactory start to the season but endued a disastrous second half of the campaign, went down in bottom place having won just five games all season. Sunderland went down on the final day of the season just one season after reaching the top flight, with Luton Town managing to escape relegation on the final day of the season for the third year running. Both Derby and Sunderland were relegated after losing at Maine Road.

Pos	Team	Pld	W	D	L	GF	GA	GD	Pts	Qualification or relegation
1	Arsenal (C)	38	24	13	1	74	18	+56	83 (Note: Arsenal deducted two points; Manchester United deducted one point due to a brawl in a game between both teams.)	Qualification for the European Cup first round
2	Liverpool	38	23	7	8	77	40	+37	76	Qualification for the UEFA Cup first round
3	Crystal Palace	38	20	9	9	50	41	+9	69	
4	Leeds United	38	19	7	12	65	47	+18	64	
5	Manchester City	38	17	11	10	64	53	+11	62	
6	Manchester United	38	16	12	10	58	45	+13	59	Qualification for the Cup Winners' Cup first round
7	Wimbledon	38	14	14	10	53	46	+7	56	
8	Nottingham Forest	38	14	12	12	65	50	+15	54	
9	Everton	38	13	12	13	50	46	+4	51	
10	Tottenham Hotspur	38	11	16	11	51	50	+1	49	Qualification for the Cup Winners' Cup qualifying round
11	Chelsea	38	13	10	15	58	69	−11	49	
12	Queens Park Rangers	38	12	10	16	44	53	−9	46	
13	Sheffield United	38	13	7	18	36	55	−19	46	
14	Southampton	38	12	9	17	58	69	−11	45	
15	Norwich City	38	13	6	19	41	64	−23	45	
16	Coventry City	38	11	11	16	42	49	−7	44	
17	Aston Villa	38	9	14	15	46	58	−12	41	
18	Luton Town	38	10	7	21	42	61	−19	37	
19	Sunderland (R)	38	8	10	20	38	60	−22	34	Relegation to the Second Division
20	Derby County (R)	38	5	9	24	37	75	−38	24	Relegation to the Second Division

Source: World Football
Rules for classification: 1) Points; 2) Goal difference; 3) Goals scored
(C) Champions; (R) Relegated

== Results ==
Home \ Away	ARS	AST	CHE	COV	CRY	DER	EVE	LEE	LIV	LUT	MCI	MUN	NWC	NOT	QPR	SHU	SOU	SUN	TOT	WDN
Arsenal		5–0	4–1	6–1	4–0	3–0	1–0	2–0	3–0	2–1	2–2	3–1	2–0	1–1	2–0	4–1	4–0	1–0	0–0	2–2
Aston Villa	0–0		2–2	2–1	2–0	3–2	2–2	0–0	0–0	1–2	1–5	1–1	2–1	1–1	2–2	2–1	1–1	3–0	3–2	1–2
Chelsea	2–1	1–0		2–1	2–1	2–1	1–2	1–2	4–2	3–3	1–1	3–2	1–1	0–0	2–0	2–2	0–2	3–2	3–2	0–0
Coventry City	0–2	2–1	1–0		3–1	3–0	3–1	1–1	0–1	2–1	3–1	2–2	2–0	2–2	3–1	0–0	1–2	0–0	2–0	0–0
Crystal Palace	0–0	0–0	2–1	2–1		2–1	0–0	1–1	1–0	1–0	1–3	3–0	1–3	2–2	0–0	1–0	2–1	2–1	1–0	4–3
Derby County	0–2	0–2	4–6	1–1	0–2		2–3	0–1	1–7	2–1	1–1	0–0	0–0	2–1	1–1	1–1	6–2	3–3	0–1	1–1
Everton	1–1	1–0	2–2	1–0	0–0	2–0		2–3	2–3	1–0	2–0	0–1	1–0	0–0	3–0	1–2	3–0	2–0	1–1	1–2
Leeds United	2–2	5–2	4–1	2–0	1–2	3–0	2–0		4–5	2–1	1–2	0–0	3–0	3–1	2–3	2–1	2–1	5–0	0–2	3–0
Liverpool	0–1	2–1	2–0	1–1	3–0	2–0	3–1	3–0		4–0	2–2	4–0	3–0	2–0	1–3	2–0	3–2	2–1	2–0	1–1
Luton Town	1–1	2–0	2–0	1–0	1–1	2–0	1–1	1–0	3–1		2–2	0–1	0–1	1–0	1–2	0–1	3–4	1–2	0–0	0–1
Manchester City	0–1	2–1	2–1	2–0	0–2	2–1	1–0	2–3	0–3	3–0		3–3	2–1	3–1	2–1	2–0	3–3	3–2	2–1	1–1
Manchester United	0–1	1–1	2–3	2–0	2–0	3–1	0–2	1–1	1–1	4–1	1–0		3–0	0–1	3–1	2–0	3–2	3–0	1–1	2–1
Norwich City	0–0	2–0	1–3	2–2	0–3	2–1	1–0	2–0	1–1	1–3	1–2	0–3		2–6	1–0	3–0	3–1	3–2	2–1	0–4
Nottingham Forest	0–2	2–2	7–0	3–0	0–1	1–0	3–1	4–3	2–1	2–2	1–3	1–1	5–0		1–1	2–0	3–1	2–0	1–2	2–1
Queens Park Rangers	1–3	2–1	1–0	1–0	1–2	1–1	1–1	2–0	1–1	6–1	1–0	1–1	1–3	1–2		1–2	2–1	3–2	0–0	0–1
Sheffield United	0–2	2–1	1–0	0–1	0–1	1–0	0–0	0–2	1–3	2–1	1–1	2–1	2–1	3–2	1–0		4–1	0–2	2–2	1–2
Southampton	1–1	1–1	3–3	2–1	2–3	0–1	3–4	2–0	1–0	1–2	2–1	1–1	1–0	1–1	3–1	2–0		3–1	3–0	1–1
Sunderland	0–0	1–3	1–0	0–0	2–1	1–2	2–2	0–1	0–1	2–0	1–1	2–1	1–2	1–0	0–1	0–1	1–0		0–0	0–0
Tottenham Hotspur	0–0	2–1	1–1	2–2	1–1	3–0	3–3	0–0	1–3	2–1	3–1	1–2	2–1	1–1	0–0	4–0	2–0	3–3		4–2
Wimbledon	0–3	0–0	2–1	1–0	0–3	3–1	2–1	0–1	1–2	2–0	1–1	1–3	0–0	3–1	3–0	1–1	1–1	2–2	5–1	

Legend: Blue = home team win; Yellow = draw; Red = away team win.

=== First Division maps ===
Locations of the Football League First Division 1990–1991 teams
Locations of the Football League First Division London teams 1990–1991

== Second Division ==
Second Division
- Season: 1990–91
- Champions: Oldham Athletic
- Promoted: Oldham Athletic; West Ham United; Sheffield Wednesday; Notts County
- Relegated: West Bromwich Albion; Hull City
- Matches: 552
- Goals: 1,481 (2.68 per match)
- Top goalscorer: Teddy Sheringham (38 goals)

The Second Division promotion race ended with Oldham Athletic as champions, sealing a return to the First Division after a 68-year absence. West Ham United reclaimed their First Division status at the second attempt, finishing runners-up in the Second Division and also reaching the semi-finals of the FA Cup. The final automatic promotion place was clinched by Sheffield Wednesday, who also won the Football League Cup to end their 56-year wait for a major trophy. Notts County then became the first team to win back-to-back promotions via the playoffs by beating Brighton 3-1 in the Second Division promotion clincher at Wembley. Teddy Sheringham found the net 38 times in the league for fifth-placed Millwall, but was unable to inspire victory in the playoffs, and was then sold to Nottingham Forest for £2.1million - a record fee for a Second Division player.

Hull City were relegated to the Third Division after six years, finishing bottom of the Second Division. They were joined in relegation on the final day by West Bromwich Albion, who had already endured the misery of an FA Cup third round exit at the hands of non-league Woking, and were now facing Third Division football for the first time in their history. However, the reorganisation of the league meant that there was one less relegation place this year, and it was Leicester City who took advantage of this by finishing 22nd and avoiding relegation.

Pos	Team	Pld	W	D	L	GF	GA	GD	Pts	Qualification or relegation
1	Oldham Athletic (C, P)	46	25	13	8	83	53	+30	88	Promotion to the First Division
2	West Ham United (P)	46	24	15	7	60	34	+26	87	Promotion to the First Division
3	Sheffield Wednesday (P)	46	22	16	8	80	51	+29	82	Promotion to the First Division
4	Notts County (O, P)	46	23	11	12	76	55	+21	80	Qualification for the Second Division play-offs
5	Millwall	46	20	13	13	70	51	+19	73	Qualification for the Second Division play-offs
6	Brighton & Hove Albion	46	21	7	18	63	69	−6	70	Qualification for the Second Division play-offs
7	Middlesbrough	46	20	9	17	66	47	+19	69	Qualification for the Second Division play-offs
8	Barnsley	46	19	12	15	63	48	+15	69	
9	Bristol City	46	20	7	19	68	71	−3	67	
10	Oxford United	46	14	19	13	69	66	+3	61	
11	Newcastle United	46	14	17	15	49	56	−7	59	
12	Wolverhampton Wanderers	46	13	19	14	63	63	0	58	
13	Bristol Rovers	46	15	13	18	56	59	−3	58	
14	Ipswich Town	46	13	18	15	60	68	−8	57	
15	Port Vale	46	15	12	19	56	64	−8	57	
16	Charlton Athletic	46	13	17	16	57	61	−4	56	
17	Portsmouth	46	14	11	21	58	70	−12	53	
18	Plymouth Argyle	46	12	17	17	54	68	−14	53	
19	Blackburn Rovers	46	14	10	22	51	66	−15	52	
20	Watford	46	12	15	19	45	59	−14	51	
21	Swindon Town	46	12	14	20	65	73	−8	50	
22	Leicester City	46	14	8	24	60	83	−23	50	
23	West Bromwich Albion (R)	46	10	18	18	52	61	−9	48	Relegation to the Third Division
24	Hull City (R)	46	10	15	21	57	85	−28	45	Relegation to the Third Division

Rules for classification: 1) Points; 2) Goal difference; 3) Goals scored
(C) Champions; (O) Play-off winners; (P) Promoted; (R) Relegated

=== Results ===
Home \ Away	BAR	BLB	B&HA	BRI	BRR	CHA	HUL	IPS	LEI	MID	MIL	NEW	NTC	OLD	OXF	PLY	PTV	POR	SHW	SWI	WAT	WBA	WHU	WOL
Barnsley		0–1	2–1	2–0	1–0	1–1	3–1	5–1	1–1	1–0	1–2	1–1	1–0	0–1	3–0	1–0	1–1	4–0	1–1	5–1	2–1	1–1	1–0	1–1
Blackburn Rovers	1–2		1–2	0–1	2–2	2–2	2–1	0–1	4–1	1–0	1–0	0–1	0–1	2–0	1–3	0–0	1–1	1–1	1–0	2–1	0–2	0–3	3–1	1–1
Brighton & Hove Albion	1–0	1–0		0–1	0–1	3–2	3–1	2–1	3–0	2–4	0–0	4–2	0–0	1–2	0–3	3–2	1–2	3–2	0–4	3–3	3–0	2–0	1–0	1–1
Bristol City	1–0	4–2	3–1		1–0	0–1	4–1	4–2	1–0	3–0	1–4	1–0	3–2	1–2	3–1	1–1	1–1	4–1	1–1	0–4	3–2	2–0	1–1	1–1
Bristol Rovers	2–1	1–2	1–3	3–2		2–1	1–1	1–0	0–0	2–0	1–0	1–1	1–1	2–0	1–0	0–0	2–0	1–2	0–1	2–1	3–1	1–1	0–1	1–1
Charlton Athletic	2–1	0–0	1–2	2–1	2–2		2–1	1–1	1–2	0–1	0–0	1–0	3–1	1–1	3–3	0–1	0–1	2–1	0–1	1–2	1–2	2–0	1–1	1–0
Hull City	1–2	3–1	0–1	1–2	2–0	2–2		3–3	5–2	0–0	1–1	2–1	1–2	2–2	3–3	2–0	3–2	0–2	0–1	1–1	1–1	1–1	0–0	1–2
Ipswich Town	2–0	2–1	1–3	1–1	2–1	4–4	2–0		3–2	0–1	0–3	2–1	0–0	1–2	1–1	3–1	3–0	2–2	0–2	1–1	1–1	1–0	0–1	0–0
Leicester City	2–1	1–3	3–0	3–0	3–2	1–2	0–1	1–2		4–3	1–2	5–4	2–1	0–0	1–0	3–1	1–1	2–1	2–4	2–2	0–0	2–1	1–2	1–0
Middlesbrough	1–0	0–1	2–0	2–1	1–2	1–2	3–0	1–1	6–0		2–1	3–0	1–0	0–1	0–0	0–0	4–0	1–2	0–2	2–0	1–2	3–2	0–0	2–0
Millwall	4–1	2–1	3–0	1–2	1–1	3–1	3–3	1–1	2–1	2–2		0–1	1–2	0–0	1–2	4–1	1–2	2–0	4–2	1–0	0–2	4–1	1–1	2–1
Newcastle United	0–0	1–0	0–0	0–0	0–2	1–3	1–2	2–2	2–1	0–0	1–2		0–2	3–2	2–2	2–0	2–0	2–1	1–0	1–1	1–0	1–1	1–1	0–0
Notts County	2–3	4–1	2–1	3–2	3–2	2–2	2–1	3–1	0–2	3–2	0–1	3–0		2–0	3–1	4–0	1–1	2–1	0–2	0–0	1–0	4–3	0–1	1–1
Oldham Athletic	2–0	1–1	6–1	2–1	2–0	1–1	1–2	2–0	2–0	2–0	1–1	1–1	2–1		3–0	5–3	2–0	3–1	3–2	3–2	4–1	2–1	1–1	4–1
Oxford United	2–0	0–0	3–0	3–1	3–1	1–1	1–0	2–1	2–2	2–5	0–0	0–0	3–3	5–1		0–0	5–2	1–0	2–2	2–4	0–1	1–3	2–1	1–1
Plymouth Argyle	1–1	4–1	2–0	1–0	2–2	2–0	4–1	0–0	2–0	1–1	3–2	0–1	0–0	1–2	2–2		2–0	1–1	1–1	3–3	1–1	2–0	0–1	1–0
Port Vale	0–1	3–0	0–1	3–2	3–2	1–1	0–0	1–2	2–0	3–1	0–2	0–1	0–1	1–0	1–0	5–1		3–2	1–1	3–1	0–0	1–2	0–1	1–2
Portsmouth	0–0	3–2	1–0	4–1	3–1	0–1	5–1	1–1	3–1	0–3	0–0	0–1	2–1	1–4	1–1	3–1	2–4		2–0	2–1	0–1	1–1	0–1	0–0
Sheffield Wednesday	3–1	3–1	1–1	3–1	2–1	0–0	5–1	2–2	0–0	2–0	2–1	2–2	2–2	2–2	0–2	3–0	1–1	2–1		2–1	2–0	1–0	1–1	2–2
Swindon Town	1–2	1–1	1–3	0–1	0–2	1–1	3–1	1–0	5–2	1–3	0–0	3–2	1–2	2–2	0–0	1–1	1–2	3–0	2–1		1–2	2–1	0–1	1–0
Watford	0–0	0–3	0–1	2–3	1–1	2–1	0–1	1–1	1–0	0–3	1–2	1–2	1–3	1–1	1–1	2–0	2–1	0–1	2–2	2–2		1–1	0–1	3–1
West Bromwich Albion	1–1	2–0	1–1	2–1	3–1	1–0	1–1	1–2	2–1	0–1	0–1	1–1	2–2	0–0	2–0	1–2	1–1	0–0	1–2	2–1	1–1		0–0	1–1
West Ham United	3–2	1–0	2–1	1–0	1–0	2–1	7–1	3–1	1–0	0–0	3–1	1–1	1–2	2–0	2–0	2–2	0–0	1–1	1–3	2–0	1–0	3–1		1–1
Wolverhampton Wanderers	0–5	2–3	2–3	4–0	1–1	3–0	0–0	2–2	2–1	1–0	4–1	2–1	0–2	2–3	3–3	3–1	3–1	3–1	3–2	1–2	0–0	2–2	2–1	

Legend: Blue = home team win; Yellow = draw; Red = away team win.

=== Overview ===
Joe Royle’s cavalier Oldham Athletic side dramatically won the Second Division championship — an injury-time penalty completing a 3–2 come-from-behind win against Sheffield Wednesday in their final game, edging them the title from previous leaders West Ham United, who would be promoted as runners-up. Joining them were League Cup winners Sheffield Wednesday, who finished in third place. Neil Warnock guided Notts County to a second successive victory in the promotion play-offs.

Hull City struggled throughout the 1990–91 season and not even the appointment of new manager Terry Dolan could save their Second Division status. They were joined on the last day of the season by West Bromwich Albion, who went down to the Third Division for the first time in their history. Leicester City were saved from suffering the same humiliation by winning their final game of the season. Albion had sacked player-manager Brian Talbot in January following an FA Cup exit at the hands of non-league Woking, but his successor Bobby Gould was unable to save Albion from the dreaded drop.

Newly promoted Bristol Rovers attained their highest league finish in years, finishing 13th. But manager Gerry Francis then resigned to take over at Queen’s Park Rangers, handing over the reins to Martin Dobson, who was just weeks into his job as Northwich Victoria manager.

Jim Smith left Newcastle United in March after more than two years at the helm, making a swift return to management with Portsmouth as successor to Frank Burrows, while Ossie Ardiles was the new man in charge on Tyneside after leaving Swindon Town. 33-year-old Glenn Hoddle was named as Swindon’s new manager.

Colin Todd departed from Middlesbrough after their failure to succeed in the play-offs, being replaced by Lennie Lawrence who called time on nine years with Charlton Athletic, who appointed Alan Curbishley and Steve Gritt as joint player-managers.

David Pleat was sacked by Leicester City in February, with Gordon Lee taking charge until the end of the season and being replaced by Brian Little.

In January Jack Walker purchased Blackburn Rovers.

=== Second Division play-offs ===
The semifinals were decided over two legs, and only the aggregates are given in the schemata below. The final consisted of only a single match.
The full results can be found at: Football League Division Two play-offs 1991.

Semifinals; 1st leg – May 19; 2nd leg – May 22, 1991
4th	Notts County	1	1	2
7th	Middlesbrough	1	0	1
5th	Millwall	1	1	2
6th	Brighton & Hove Albion	4	2	6

Final at Wembley; June 2, 1991
4th	Notts County	3
6th	Brighton & Hove Albion	1

=== Second Division maps ===
Locations of the Football League Second Division 1990–1991 teams
Locations of the Football League Second Division London teams 1990–1991

== Third Division ==
An incredible season for the newly promoted teams in the Third Division saw champions Cambridge United, runners-up Grimsby Town and third placed Southend United all win a second successive promotion. The final promotion place went to playoff winners Tranmere Rovers, who had last played Second Division football in the 1930s, and prepared to thrive as this higher level by signing former Liverpool striker John Aldridge shortly after securing promotion.

Rotherham United and Crewe Alexandra both dropped back into the Fourth Division after just two seasons in the Third Division, with this being Crewe's first relegation for over 20 years, while Mansfield Town's relegation ended their five-year spell in the Third Division. However, the reorganisation of the Football League meant one fewer relegation place in the Third Division, with Fulham finishing 21st but being spared from Fourth Division football for the first time as a result.

Football LeagueThird Division
- Season: 1990–91
- Champions: Cambridge United (1st title)
- Promoted: Grimsby Town; Southend United; Tranmere Rovers
- Relegated: Crewe Alexandra; Mansfield Town; Rotherham United
- Matches: 552
- Goals: 1,381 (2.5 per match)
- Top goalscorer: Brett Angell (Southend United), 26; Tony Philliskirk (Bolton Wanderers), 26

Pos	Team	Pld	W	D	L	GF	GA	GD	Pts	Promotion or relegation
1	Cambridge United (C, P)	46	25	11	10	75	45	+30	86	Promotion to the Second Division
2	Southend United (P)	46	26	7	13	67	51	+16	85	Promotion to the Second Division
3	Grimsby Town (P)	46	24	11	11	66	34	+32	83	Promotion to the Second Division
4	Bolton Wanderers	46	24	11	11	64	50	+14	83	Qualification for the Third Division play-offs
5	Tranmere Rovers (O, P)	46	23	9	14	64	46	+18	78	Qualification for the Third Division play-offs
6	Brentford	46	21	13	12	59	47	+12	76	Qualification for the Third Division play-offs
7	Bury	46	20	13	13	67	56	+11	73	Qualification for the Third Division play-offs
8	Bradford City	46	20	10	16	62	54	+8	70	
9	Bournemouth	46	19	13	14	58	58	0	70	
10	Wigan Athletic	46	20	9	17	71	54	+17	69	
11	Huddersfield Town	46	18	13	15	57	51	+6	67	
12	Birmingham City	46	16	17	13	45	49	−4	65	
13	Leyton Orient	46	18	10	18	55	58	−3	64	
14	Stoke City	46	16	12	18	55	59	−4	60	
15	Reading	46	17	8	21	53	66	−13	59	
16	Exeter City	46	16	9	21	58	52	+6	57	
17	Preston North End	46	15	11	20	54	67	−13	56	
18	Shrewsbury Town	46	14	10	22	61	68	−7	52	
19	Chester City	46	14	9	23	46	58	−12	51	
20	Swansea City	46	13	9	24	49	72	−23	48	Qualification for the Cup Winners' Cup first round
21	Fulham	46	10	16	20	41	56	−15	46	
22	Crewe Alexandra (R)	46	11	11	24	62	80	−18	44	Relegation to the Fourth Division
23	Rotherham United (R)	46	10	12	24	50	87	−37	42	Relegation to the Fourth Division
24	Mansfield Town (R)	46	8	14	24	42	63	−21	38	Relegation to the Fourth Division

(C) Champions; (O) Play-off winners; (P) Promoted; (R) Relegated

=== Third Division results ===
Home \ Away	BIR	BOL	BOU	BRA	BRE	BRY	CAM	CHR	CRE	EXE	FUL	GRI	HUD	LEY	MAN	PNE	REA	ROT	SHR	STD	STK	SWA	TRA	WIG
Birmingham City		1–3	0–0	1–1	0–2	1–0	0–3	1–0	0–2	1–1	2–0	0–0	1–2	3–1	0–0	1–1	1–1	2–1	0–1	1–1	2–1	2–0	1–0	0–0
Bolton Wanderers	3–1		4–1	0–1	1–0	1–3	2–2	1–0	3–2	1–0	3–0	0–0	1–1	1–0	1–1	1–2	3–1	0–0	1–0	1–0	0–1	1–0	2–1	2–1
Bournemouth	1–2	1–0		3–1	2–0	1–1	0–1	1–0	1–1	2–1	3–0	2–1	3–1	2–2	0–0	0–0	2–0	4–2	3–2	3–1	1–1	1–0	1–0	0–3
Bradford City	2–0	1–1	3–0		0–1	3–1	0–1	2–1	2–0	3–0	0–0	0–2	2–2	4–0	1–0	2–1	2–1	1–0	2–4	2–1	1–2	0–1	1–2	2–1
Brentford	2–2	4–2	0–0	6–1		2–2	0–3	0–1	1–0	1–0	1–2	1–0	1–0	1–0	0–0	2–0	1–0	1–2	3–0	0–1	0–4	2–0	0–2	1–0
Bury	0–1	2–2	2–4	0–0	1–1		3–1	2–1	1–3	3–1	1–1	3–2	2–1	1–0	1–0	3–1	2–1	3–1	2–1	0–1	1–1	1–0	3–0	2–2
Cambridge United	0–1	2–1	4–0	2–1	0–0	2–2		1–1	3–4	1–0	1–0	1–0	0–0	1–0	2–1	1–1	3–0	4–1	3–1	1–4	3–0	2–0	3–1	2–3
Chester	0–1	0–2	0–0	4–2	1–2	1–0	0–2		3–1	1–2	1–0	1–2	1–2	2–0	1–0	1–1	1–0	1–2	3–2	1–0	1–1	2–1	0–2	1–2
Crewe Alexandra	1–1	1–3	0–2	0–0	3–3	2–2	3–1	1–3		1–1	1–1	1–2	1–1	3–3	3–0	2–2	1–0	3–1	1–2	0–2	1–2	3–0	2–3	1–0
Exeter City	0–2	2–1	2–0	2–2	1–1	2–0	0–1	1–1	3–0		0–1	0–0	2–2	2–0	2–0	4–0	1–3	2–0	3–0	1–2	2–0	2–0	0–0	1–0
Fulham	2–2	0–1	1–1	0–0	0–1	2–0	0–2	4–1	2–1	3–2		0–0	0–0	1–1	1–0	1–0	1–1	2–0	4–0	0–3	0–1	1–1	1–2	1–2
Grimsby Town	0–0	0–1	5–0	1–1	2–0	0–1	1–0	2–0	0–1	2–1	3–0		4–0	2–2	2–0	4–1	3–0	2–1	1–0	1–0	2–0	1–0	0–1	4–3
Huddersfield Town	0–1	4–0	1–3	1–2	1–2	2–1	3–1	1–1	3–1	1–0	1–0	1–1		1–0	2–2	1–0	0–2	4–0	2–1	1–2	3–0	1–2	2–1	1–0
Leyton Orient	1–1	0–1	2–0	2–1	1–2	1–0	0–3	1–0	3–2	1–0	1–0	0–2	1–0		2–1	1–0	4–0	3–0	3–2	0–1	0–2	3–0	4–0	1–1
Mansfield Town	1–2	4–0	1–1	0–1	0–2	0–1	2–2	1–0	1–3	0–2	1–1	1–1	0–0	3–3		0–1	2–0	1–2	2–1	0–1	0–0	2–0	0–2	1–1
Preston North End	2–0	1–2	0–0	0–3	1–1	1–1	0–2	0–0	5–1	1–0	1–0	1–3	1–1	2–1	3–1		1–2	1–2	4–3	2–1	2–0	2–0	0–4	2–1
Reading	2–2	0–1	2–1	1–2	1–2	1–0	2–2	2–2	2–1	1–0	1–0	2–0	1–2	1–2	2–1	3–3		2–0	1–2	2–4	1–0	0–0	1–0	3–1
Rotherham United	1–1	2–2	1–1	0–2	2–2	0–3	3–2	2–1	1–1	2–4	3–1	1–4	1–3	0–0	1–1	1–0	0–2		2–2	0–1	0–0	2–3	1–1	5–1
Shrewsbury Town	4–1	0–1	3–1	1–0	1–1	1–1	1–2	1–0	1–0	2–2	2–2	1–2	0–0	3–0	0–3	0–1	5–1	0–0		0–1	2–0	1–2	0–1	0–0
Southend United	2–1	1–1	2–1	1–1	0–1	2–1	0–0	1–1	3–2	2–1	1–1	2–0	0–1	1–1	2–1	3–2	1–2	2–1	2–1		1–0	4–1	1–0	0–2
Stoke City	0–1	2–2	1–3	2–1	2–2	2–2	1–1	2–3	1–0	2–1	2–1	0–0	2–0	1–2	3–1	0–1	0–1	3–1	1–3	4–0		2–2	1–1	2–0
Swansea City	2–0	1–2	1–2	0–2	2–2	1–2	0–0	1–0	3–1	0–3	2–2	0–0	1–0	0–0	1–2	3–1	3–1	5–0	0–1	1–4	2–1		1–1	1–6
Tranmere Rovers	1–0	1–1	1–0	2–1	2–1	1–2	2–0	1–2	2–0	1–0	1–1	1–2	2–0	3–0	6–2	2–1	0–0	1–2	1–1	3–1	1–2	2–1		1–1
Wigan Athletic	1–1	2–1	2–0	3–0	1–0	1–2	0–1	2–0	1–0	4–1	2–0	2–0	1–1	1–2	0–2	2–1	1–0	2–0	2–2	4–1	4–0	2–4	0–1	

Legend: Blue = home team win; Yellow = draw; Red = away team win.

=== Third Division play-offs ===
The semifinals were decided over two legs, and only the aggregates are given in the schemata below. The final consisted of only a single match.
The full results can be found at: Football League Division Three play-offs 1991.

Semifinals; 1st leg – May 19; 2nd leg – May 22, 1991
4th	Bolton Wanderers	1	1	2
7th	Bury	1	0	1
5th	Tranmere Rovers	2	1	3
6th	Brentford	2	0	2

Final at Wembley; June 1, 1991
4th	Bolton Wanderers	0
5th	Tranmere Rovers (a.e.t.)	1

=== Third Division maps ===
Locations of the Football League Third Division teams 1990–1991
Locations of the Football League Third Division London teams 1990–1991

== Fourth Division ==
A year after sealing an instant return to the Football League, Darlington clinched the Fourth Division title to earn a second successive promotion. Their run of success under manager Brian Little attracted the attention of bigger clubs, and after the end of the season he accepted an offer to manage Leicester City in the Second Division. Stockport County finished runners-up to end their lengthy stay in the Fourth Division, and in doing so their Uruguayan manager became the first foreign manager to achieve promotion in the Football League. Hartlepool United, another team who had endured a long run in the league's lowest tier, sealed promotion in third place, with coach Alan Murray taking charge for the final four months of the season due to manager Cyril Knowles becoming seriously ill, taking over on a permanent basis after the end of the season when Knowles declared himself unable to continue as manager. The fourth promotion place went to Peterborough United, despite the Cambridgeshire club changing its manager twice of the course of the season, beginning with Mark Lawrenson in charge, before switching to Dave Booth in mid November and finally appointing Chris Turner in January.

As with the Second and Third Divisions, the reorganisation of the Football League gave the Fourth Division an additional promotion place, with five teams going up this season instead of the usual four. The final promotion place was clinched by Torquay United, who defeated Blackpool in a penalty shootout in the playoff final, becoming the first Football League team to win promotion on penalties, and ending a run of nearly 20 seasons in the Fourth Division for the Devon club.

The admission of a 93rd club to the Football League for the 1991-92 season meant that there was no relegation from the Fourth Division this season, meaning that bottom placed Wrexham held onto their league status. Joining the league for the 1991-92 season were the Conference champions Barnet, managed by former Manchester United youth team player Barry Fry.

Football LeagueFourth Division
- Season: 1990–91
- Champions: Darlington (1st title)
- Promoted: Hartlepool United; Peterborough United; Stockport County; Torquay United
- Relegated to Conference: None
- New club in the league: Darlington
- Matches: 552
- Goals: 1,415 (2.56 per match)
- Top goalscorer: Steve Norris (Halifax Town), 35

Pos	Team	Pld	W	D	L	GF	GA	GD	Pts	Promotion
1	Darlington (C, P)	46	22	17	7	68	38	+30	83	Promotion to the Third Division
2	Stockport County (P)	46	23	13	10	84	47	+37	82	Promotion to the Third Division
3	Hartlepool United (P)	46	24	10	12	67	48	+19	82	Promotion to the Third Division
4	Peterborough United (P)	46	21	17	8	67	45	+22	80	Promotion to the Third Division
5	Blackpool	46	23	10	13	78	47	+31	79	Qualification for the Fourth Division play-offs
6	Burnley	46	23	10	13	70	51	+19	79	Qualification for the Fourth Division play-offs
7	Torquay United (O, P)	46	18	18	10	64	47	+17	72	Qualification for the Fourth Division play-offs
8	Scunthorpe United	46	20	11	15	71	62	+9	71	Qualification for the Fourth Division play-offs
9	Scarborough	46	19	12	15	59	56	+3	69	
10	Northampton Town	46	18	13	15	57	58	−1	67	
11	Doncaster Rovers	46	17	14	15	56	46	+10	65	
12	Rochdale	46	15	17	14	50	53	−3	62	
13	Cardiff City	46	15	15	16	43	54	−11	60	
14	Lincoln City	46	14	17	15	50	61	−11	59	
15	Gillingham	46	12	18	16	57	60	−3	54	
16	Walsall	46	12	17	17	48	51	−3	53	
17	Hereford United	46	13	14	19	53	58	−5	53	
18	Chesterfield	46	13	14	19	47	62	−15	53	
19	Maidstone United	46	13	12	21	66	71	−5	51	
20	Carlisle United	46	13	9	24	47	89	−42	48	
21	York City	46	11	13	22	45	57	−12	46	
22	Halifax Town	46	12	10	24	59	79	−20	46	
23	Aldershot	46	10	11	25	61	101	−40	41	
24	Wrexham	46	10	10	26	48	74	−26	40	

(C) Champions; (O) Play-off winners; (P) Promoted

=== Fourth Division results ===
Home \ Away	ALD	BLP	BUR	CAR	CRL	CHF	DAR	DON	GIL	HAL	HAR	HER	LIN	MDS	NOR	PET	ROC	SCA	SCU	STP	TOR	WAL	WRE	YOR
Aldershot		1–4	1–2	0–0	3–0	1–0	0–2	1–1	1–0	2–2	1–5	1–0	0–3	4–3	3–3	5–0	2–2	2–2	3–2	2–2	2–3	0–4	3–2	0–1
Blackpool	4–2		1–2	3–0	6–0	3–0	1–2	2–0	2–0	2–0	2–0	3–0	5–0	2–2	2–1	1–1	0–0	3–1	3–1	3–2	1–0	1–2	4–1	1–0
Burnley	3–0	2–0		2–0	2–1	0–1	3–1	1–0	2–2	2–1	4–0	2–1	2–2	2–1	3–0	4–1	1–0	2–1	1–1	3–2	1–1	2–0	2–0	0–0
Cardiff City	1–3	1–1	3–0		3–1	2–1	0–1	0–2	2–0	1–0	1–0	0–2	0–1	0–0	1–0	1–1	0–1	0–0	1–0	3–3	3–3	0–2	1–0	2–1
Carlisle United	1–2	1–0	1–1	3–2		1–0	0–2	2–3	0–4	0–3	1–0	0–1	0–0	1–0	4–1	3–2	1–1	4–1	0–3	1–0	3–1	0–3	2–0	1–0
Chesterfield	1–0	2–2	2–1	0–0	4–1		2–2	2–1	1–1	2–1	2–3	1–0	1–1	1–2	0–0	2–2	1–1	0–1	1–0	1–1	1–1	2–2	2–1	2–2
Darlington	3–1	1–1	3–1	4–1	3–1	1–0		1–1	1–1	3–0	0–1	3–1	1–1	1–1	1–1	0–1	2–0	2–1	0–0	1–0	3–0	1–0	1–0	0–0
Doncaster Rovers	3–0	1–0	2–1	1–1	4–0	0–1	0–1		1–1	1–2	2–2	3–1	1–0	3–0	2–1	0–2	1–0	0–2	2–3	1–0	1–1	2–0	3–1	2–2
Gillingham	1–1	2–2	3–2	4–0	2–1	0–1	1–0	2–0		1–0	3–0	2–1	2–2	0–2	0–0	2–3	2–2	1–1	1–1	1–3	2–2	1–0	2–3	0–0
Halifax Town	3–0	5–3	1–2	1–2	1–1	2–1	0–0	0–1	1–2		1–2	0–4	1–1	3–2	2–1	1–1	2–0	1–2	0–0	0–0	0–1	5–2	2–0	2–1
Hartlepool United	1–0	1–2	0–0	0–2	4–1	2–0	0–0	1–1	1–0	2–1		2–1	2–0	1–0	3–1	2–0	2–2	2–0	2–0	3–1	0–0	2–1	2–1	0–1
Hereford United	1–0	1–1	3–0	1–1	4–2	2–3	1–1	1–1	1–1	1–0	1–3		0–1	4–0	1–2	0–0	2–0	3–3	2–0	0–0	0–0	0–0	1–0	2–0
Lincoln City	2–2	0–1	1–0	0–0	6–2	1–1	0–3	0–0	1–1	1–0	3–1	1–1		2–1	3–1	0–2	1–2	2–0	1–2	0–3	3–2	2–1	0–0	2–1
Maidstone United	1–1	1–1	1–0	3–0	0–0	1–0	2–3	0–1	3–1	5–1	1–4	1–1	4–1		1–3	2–0	0–1	0–1	6–1	2–3	2–2	1–3	0–2	5–4
Northampton Town	2–1	1–0	0–0	0–0	1–1	1–2	0–3	0–0	2–1	1–0	3–2	3–0	1–1	2–0		1–2	3–2	0–2	2–1	1–0	1–4	5–0	1–0	2–1
Peterborough United	3–2	2–0	3–2	3–0	1–1	2–1	2–2	1–1	2–0	2–0	1–1	3–0	2–0	2–0	1–0		1–1	2–0	0–0	0–0	1–2	0–0	2–2	2–0
Rochdale	4–0	2–1	0–0	0–0	0–1	3–0	1–1	0–3	1–3	1–1	0–0	2–1	0–0	3–2	1–1	0–3		1–1	2–1	1–0	0–0	3–2	2–0	2–1
Scarborough	2–0	0–1	0–1	1–2	1–1	1–0	1–1	2–1	2–1	4–1	2–0	2–1	3–0	0–2	1–1	3–1	0–0		3–1	0–2	1–0	1–0	4–2	2–2
Scunthorpe United	6–2	2–0	1–3	0–2	2–0	3–0	2–1	1–1	1–0	4–4	2–1	3–0	2–1	2–2	3–0	1–1	2–1	3–0		3–0	3–0	1–0	2–0	2–1
Stockport County	3–2	0–0	2–2	1–1	3–1	3–1	3–1	0–0	1–1	5–1	1–3	4–2	4–0	1–0	2–0	2–1	3–0	2–2	5–0		2–1	3–0	2–0	2–0
Torquay United	5–0	2–1	2–0	2–1	3–0	2–0	2–1	1–0	3–1	3–1	0–1	1–1	0–1	1–1	0–0	0–0	3–1	2–0	1–1	1–1		0–0	1–0	2–1
Walsall	2–2	2–0	1–0	0–0	1–1	3–0	2–2	1–0	0–0	3–1	0–1	0–0	0–0	0–0	3–3	0–1	0–1	0–0	3–0	0–2	2–2		1–0	1–1
Wrexham	4–2	0–1	2–4	1–0	3–0	1–1	1–1	2–1	3–0	1–2	2–2	1–2	2–2	2–2	0–2	0–0	2–1	1–2	1–0	1–3	2–1	1–1		0–4
York City	2–0	0–1	2–0	1–2	2–0	0–2	0–1	3–1	1–1	3–3	0–0	1–0	1–0	0–1	0–1	0–4	0–2	2–0	2–2	0–2	0–0	1–0	0–0	

Legend: Blue = home team win; Yellow = draw; Red = away team win.

=== Overview ===
Brian Little’s Darlington won the Fourth Division championship to earn a second successive promotion, while the other four promotion places went to Stockport County, Hartlepool United, Peterborough United and Torquay United. Torquay were the eventual winners, beating Blackpool in a penalty shootout.

Wrexham finished bottom of the league for the first time since 1965–66, but due to League expansion they avoided relegation into the Conference.

Brian Little left Darlington just after their promotion success, taking over at Leicester City, leaving Frank Gray to pick up the pieces at the Feethams.

Manager Cyril Knowles departed from Hartlepool on sick leave three months before their promotion, with player-coach Alan Murray overseeing the final stages of the campaign. Murray took over on a permanent basis when Knowles confirmed that he would be unable to return to the club following brain surgery.

=== Fourth Division play-offs ===
The semifinals were decided over two legs, and only the aggregates are given in the schemata below. The final consisted of only a single match.
The full results can be found at: Football League Division Four play-offs 1991.

Semifinals; 1st leg – May 19; 2nd leg – May 22, 1991
5th	Blackpool	1	2	3
8th	Scunthorpe United	1	1	2
6th	Burnley	0	1	1
7th	Torquay United	2	0	2

Final at Wembley; May 31, 1991
5th	Blackpool	2 (4)
7th	Torquay United (pen.)	2 (5)

=== Fourth Division maps ===
Locations of the Football League Fourth Division teams 1990–1991

== Attendances ==
=== Barclays League Division One ===
#	Football club	Average
1	Manchester United	43,218
2	Arsenal FC	36,864
3	Liverpool FC	36,038
4	Tottenham Hotspur FC	30,632
5	Leeds United FC	29,312
6	Manchester City FC	27,874
7	Aston Villa FC	25,663
8	Everton FC	25,028
9	Sunderland AFC	22,577
10	Nottingham Forest FC	22,137
11	Sheffield United FC	21,461
12	Chelsea FC	20,738
13	Crystal Palace FC	19,660
14	Derby County FC	16,257
15	Norwich City FC	15,468
16	Southampton FC	15,413
17	Coventry City FC	13,794
18	Queens Park Rangers FC	13,524
19	Luton Town FC	10,325
20	Wimbledon FC	7,631

=== Barclays League Division Two ===
#	Football club	Average
1	Sheffield Wednesday FC	26,605
2	West Ham United FC	22,551
3	Middlesbrough FC	17,023
4	Newcastle United FC	16,834
5	Wolverhampton Wanderers FC	15,837
6	Bristol City FC	13,495
7	Oldham Athletic FC	13,247
8	West Bromwich Albion FC	11,993
9	Ipswich Town FC	11,772
10	Leicester City FC	11,546
11	Millwall FC	10,846
12	Swindon Town FC	9,823
13	Portsmouth FC	9,689
14	Watford FC	9,575
15	Barnsley FC	8,937
16	Brighton & Hove Albion FC	8,386
17	Notts County FC	8,164
18	Blackburn Rovers FC	8,126
19	Port Vale FC	8,092
20	Plymouth Argyle FC	6,851
21	Charlton Athletic FC	6,548
22	Hull City AFC	6,165
23	Bristol Rovers FC	5,929
24	Oxford United FC	5,780

=== Barclays League Division Three ===
#	Football club	Average
1	Stoke City FC	11,565
2	Bolton Wanderers FC	7,277
3	Grimsby Town FC	7,237
4	Birmingham City FC	7,030
5	Tranmere Rovers	6,740
6	Bradford City AFC	6,644
7	Southend United FC	6,174
8	Brentford FC	6,144
9	AFC Bournemouth	6,017
10	Cambridge United FC	5,503
11	Huddersfield Town AFC	5,351
12	Preston North End FC	5,214
13	Rotherham United FC	4,600
14	Exeter City FC	4,285
15	Leyton Orient FC	4,194
16	Reading FC	4,079
17	Fulham FC	4,057
18	Crewe Alexandra FC	3,748
19	Swansea City AFC	3,665
20	Bury FC	3,572
21	Shrewsbury Town FC	3,442
22	Wigan Athletic FC	2,889
23	Mansfield Town FC	2,683
24	Chester City FC	1,564

=== Barclays League Division Four ===
#	Football club	Average
1	Burnley FC	7,882
2	Peterborough United FC	5,211
3	Walsall FC	4,149
4	Blackpool FC	4,059
5	Darlington FC	4,021
6	Chesterfield FC	3,712
7	Northampton Town FC	3,710
8	Stockport County FC	3,562
9	Gillingham FC	3,523
10	Hartlepool United FC	3,180
11	Scunthorpe United FC	3,114
12	Carlisle United FC	3,006
13	Torquay United FC	2,986
14	Lincoln City FC	2,967
15	Cardiff City FC	2,946
16	Doncaster Rovers FC	2,831
17	Hereford United FC	2,599
18	York City FC	2,516
19	Rochdale AFC	2,238
20	Aldershot Town FC	2,091
21	Wrexham AFC	1,885
22	Maidstone United FC	1,854
23	Halifax Town AFC	1,699
24	Scarborough FC	1,597

== See also ==
- 1990-91 in English football
