= Matty Brown =

English footballer

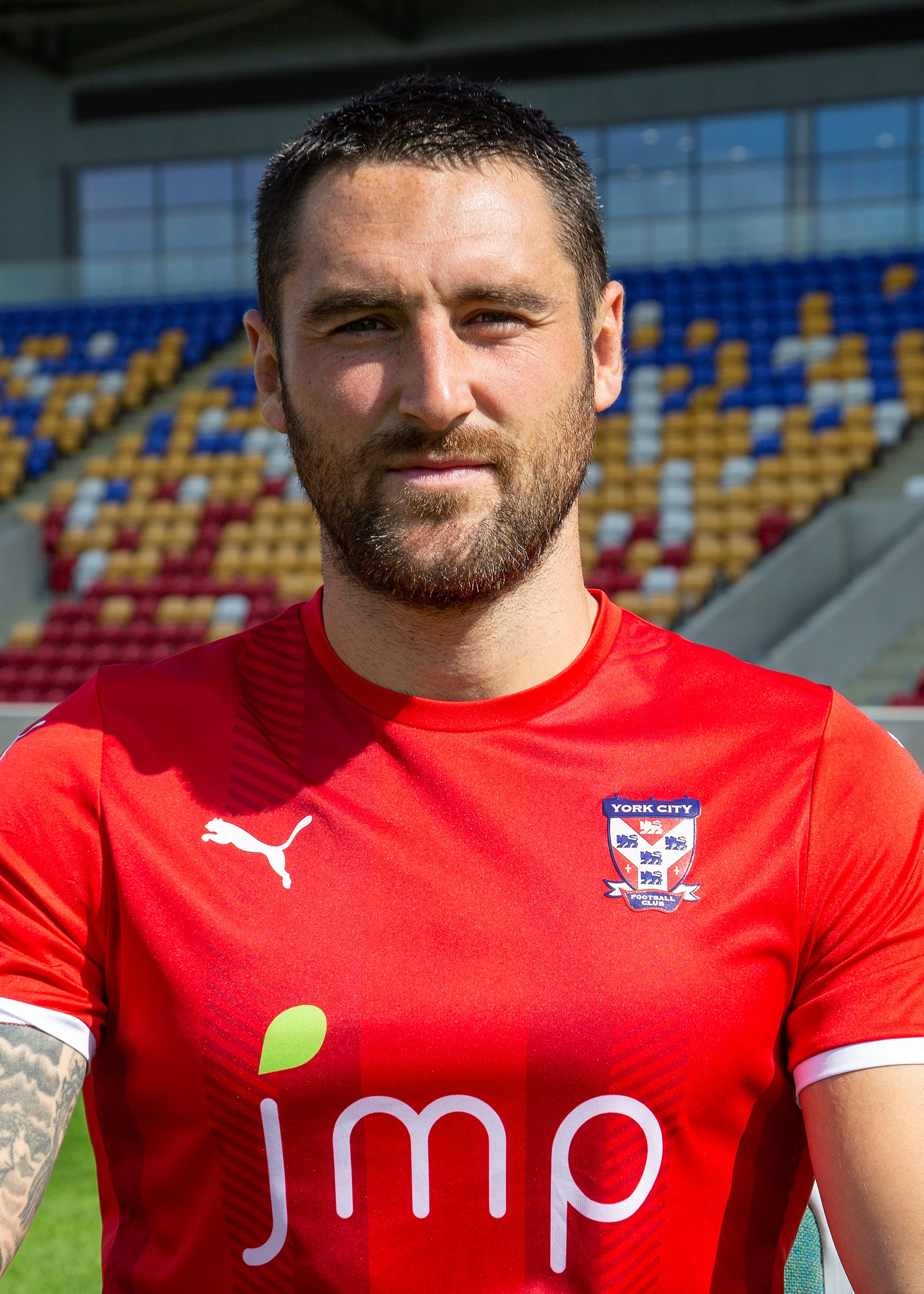
- Brown with York City in 2021

Personal information
- Full name: Matthew Anthony Brown
- Date of birth: 15 March 1990 (age 36)
- Place of birth: Great Crosby, England
- Position: Defender

Youth career
- Tranmere Rovers
- Manchester City

Senior career*
Years	Team	Apps	(Gls)
2010–2011	Northwich Victoria		
2011–2013	Marine	60	(3)
2013–2014	Chesterfield	3	(1)
2013	→ Southport (loan)	4	(1)
2014	→ Chester (loan)	8	(0)
2014–2015	Chester	23	(3)
2015–2020	FC Halifax Town	122	(6)
2020–2022	York City	47	(2)
2022–2023	AFC Telford United	0	(0)
2023	Marine	0	(0)
- * Club domestic league appearances and goals

Matthew Anthony Brown (born 15 March 1990) is an English former footballer who played as a defender, most recently for Marine.

== Career ==
Brown began his career in the youth teams at Tranmere Rovers and Manchester City before playing semi-professional football with Northwich Victoria and Marine. While he played for Marine he also worked a full-time job at telecoms company MJ Quinn as the coordinator of the Scotland patch. He went on trial at League side Chesterfield in the summer of 2013 which was a success and he joined the Spireites on a one-year contract. In October 2013 he joined Conference Premier side Southport on loan where he played five times scoring once against Cambridge United. He made his Football League debut on 14 December 2013 against Plymouth Argyle and scored in a 2–0 victory, however he was later sent-off. Chesterfield successfully appealed against his dismissal and his ban was rescinded.

On 7 February 2014, Brown linked up with Chester on an initial one-month loan deal, but remained there until the end of the season.

On 13 May 2014, Chesterfield announced that Brown had been released.

On 21 September 2020, York City announced that Brown had signed for them following his release from FC Halifax Town. When asked about Brown for the signing, manager Steve Watson described Brown as "Physically [he is] very dominant, dominant vocally as well but apart from that a very good footballer, I very rarely sign players who can't handle the ball. He's actually a very good passer of the ball as well which suits the way we always try and play.".

Following promotion through the play-offs with York City, Brown returned to the National League North to join AFC Telford United.

In May 2023, Brown signed for Marine for the second time. However, due to injury issues he chose to retire in August 2023.

== Career statistics ==
As of match played 25 November 2017

Appearances and goals by club, season and competition
Club	Season	League			FA Cup		League Cup		Other^{[A]}		Total	
Club	Season	Division	Apps	Goals	Apps	Goals	Apps	Goals	Apps	Goals	Apps	Goals
Marine	2011–12	NPL Premier Division	24	2	0	0	1	0	5	1	30	3
Marine	2012–13	NPL Premier Division	36	1	4	0	2	0	1	0	43	1
Marine	Total		60	3	4	0	3	0	6	1	73	4
Chesterfield	2013–14	League Two	3	1	0	0	0	0	0	0	3	1
Southport (loan)	2013–14	Conference Premier	4	1	1	0	—		0	0	5	1
Chester (loan)	2013–14	Conference Premier	8	0	0	0	—		0	0	8	0
Chester	2014–15	Conference Premier	23	3	4	0	—		2 (Note: Appearances in the FA Trophy)	0	29	3
Chester	Total		31	3	4	0	—	—	2	0	37	3
FC Halifax Town	2015–16	National League	29	0	2	0	—		7	0	38	0
FC Halifax Town	2016–17	National League North	11	0	0	0	—		0	0	11	0
FC Halifax Town	2017–18	National League	21	3	1	0	—		0	0	22	3
FC Halifax Town	Total		61	3	3	0	—	—	7	0	71	3
Career total			159	11	12	0	3	0	15	1	189	12

A. The "Other" column constitutes appearances and goals in the FA Trophy, Lancashire FA Challenge Trophy, Liverpool Senior Cup.

== Honours ==
FC Halifax Town

- FA Trophy: 2015–16
