= Charlie Rackstraw =

English footballer

Personal information
- Date of birth: 23 April 1938 (age 88)
- Place of birth: Sheffield, England
- Position: Striker

Youth career
- Chesterfield

Senior career*
Years	Team	Apps	(Gls)
1958–1964	Chesterfield	172	(48)
1964–1967	Gillingham	94	(25)
1967–1969	Bradford City	104	(27)
1970	Altrincham		
1970–1971	Bradford Park Avenue		
- * Club domestic league appearances and goals

Charles Rackstraw (born 23 April 1938) is an English former professional footballer. Born in Sheffield, his clubs included Chesterfield, Bradford City and Gillingham. He made 370 appearances in the Football League and scored 100 goals.
