= Herbert Munday =

English footballer

Personal information
- Full name: Herbert Munday
- Date of birth: 23 April 1876
- Place of birth: Eckington, Derbyshire, England
- Date of death: 1961 (aged 84–85)
- Position: Inside forward

Senior career*
Years	Team	Apps	(Gls)
1892–1893	Eckington White Star		
1893–1899	Eckington Works		
1899–1909	Chesterfield Town	314	(108)
1909	Eckington Red Rose		
Total		314	(108)
- * Club domestic league appearances and goals

Herbert Munday (23 April 1876 – 1961) was an English footballer who played in the Football League for Chesterfield Town. Munday's 107 League goals up to 1909 was the highest recorded by any player in the Second Division up to the start of the First World War.
