= Jack Broadhead =

English footballer (born 1994)

Personal information
- Full name: Jack Patrick Broadhead
- Date of birth: 2 October 1994 (age 32)
- Place of birth: Mansfield, England
- Positions: Defender; midfielder

Team information
- Current team: Belper Town

Youth career
- Chesterfield

Senior career*
Years	Team	Apps	(Gls)
2012–2015	Chesterfield	1	(0)
2013	→ Buxton (loan)	19	(0)
2014	→ Worksop Town (loan)		
2014	→ Matlock Town (loan)	7	(2)
2014	→ Buxton (loan)	4	(0)
2014	→ Frickley Athletic (loan)	12	(3)
2015–2017	Mickleover Sports	52	(3)
2017–2018	Boston United	21	(0)
2018	→ Buxton (loan)	21	(4)
2018–2019	AFC Mansfield	15	(1)
2019–2020	Grantham Town	17	(0)
2020	Pontefract Collieries	2	(0)
2020–2024	Worksop Town	119	(17)
2024–	Belper Town	0	(0)
- * Club domestic league appearances and goals as of 13:04, 15 June 2024 (UTC)

Jack Patrick Broadhead (born 2 October 1994) is an English footballer who plays as a defender for Belper Town.

== Playing career ==
Born in Mansfield, England, and growing up as a Liverpool supporter, Broadhead began his career at Chesterfield, and was named as the club's Young Player of the Year in 2011–12.

He made his first team debut at the Proact Stadium in the FA Cup on 3 November 2012, replacing Mark Randall 89 minutes into a 6–1 victory over Hartlepool United. Later in the month he was offered his first senior contract at the club, which would secure him as a "Spireites" player until summer 2015; the team's youth coach, Dave Bentley, said that such a lengthy contract was "unheard of really for... a young player at this stage of the season".

On 17 August 2013 he signed for Northern Premier League side Buxton on a months loan. On 11 September 2013 he extended his stay at Buxton until 17 November 2013. After making sixteen appearances in all competitions, Broadhead returned to his parent club, though the club's manager expressed Broadhead would one day make a return to Buxton. Broadhead, himself, stated his loan spell at Buxton helped him progress.

On 2 January 2014, Broadhead joined Evo-Stik NPL Premier Division side Worksop Town on loan for the second time this season until 1 February 2014. Then on 26 March 2014, Broadhead joined Northern Premier League side Matlock Town on loan for the rest of the 2013–14 campaign.

At the start of the 2014–15 season, Broadhead made his first Chesterfield start on 2 September 2014 in Chesterfield's 2–0 Football League Trophy First Round defeat at Scunthorpe United. He was sent-off in the 84th minute after receiving two yellow cards. Following this, Broadhead re-joined Buxton for the second time on 4 October 2014.

On 21 November 2014, Broadhead joined Frickley Athletic on a one-month loan. Soon after, Broadhead's loan spell at Chesterfield was extended until 17 January 2015, as well as, addition of 24-hour clause. On 17 May 2015, Broadhead was released by Chesterfield. Following his release, Broadhead joined Mickleover Sports.

Broadhead joined Boston United on the transfer deadline day in March 2017. In January 2018, he was loaned out to his former club Buxton for the rest of the season.

Broadhead spent the 2018/19 season with A.F.C. Mansfield, before joining Grantham Town ahead of the 2019/20 season. He left the club in February 2020 to join Pontefract Collieries.

In June 2024, Broadhead joined Belper Town.

== Statistics ==
Club	Season	League			FA Cup		League Cup		Other		Total	
Club	Season	Division	Apps	Goals	Apps	Goals	Apps	Goals	Apps	Goals	Apps	Goals
Chesterfield	2012–13	League Two	0	0	2	0	0	0	0	0	2	0
Chesterfield	2014–15	League One	1	0	1	0	0	0	2	0	2	0
Career total			1	0	2	0	0	0	2	0	4	0

== Honours ==
Individual

- Chesterfield F.C. Young Player of the Year: 2011–12
