= Charlie Dawes =

English footballer

Personal information
- Full name: Charlie Dawes
- Date of birth: 13 September 1995 (age 31)
- Place of birth: Chesterfield, England
- Position: Forward

Team information
- Current team: Worksop Town

Youth career
- –2014: Sheffield Wednesday

Senior career*
Years	Team	Apps	(Gls)
2014–2015	Chesterfield	0	(0)
2014–2015	→ Matlock Town (loan)	0	(0)
2015	→ Stalybridge Celtic (loan)	1	(0)
2016	Matlock Town		
2016	Sheffield		
2016–	Worksop Town		
- * Club domestic league appearances and goals as of 21:48, 13 August 2016 (UTC)

Charlie Dawes (born 13 September 1995) is an English footballer who plays for Worksop Town as a forward.

== Career ==
Born in Chesterfield, Dawes started his career at Sheffield Wednesday and left Sheffield Wednesday to sign his first professional contract for one-year with Chesterfield.

Dawes made his professional début and first start for Chesterfield on 2 September 2014 in a 2–0 Football League Trophy defeat against Scunthorpe United, playing 74 minutes before being replaced by Jake Beesley. Dawes have spent throughout the season, playing in the club's reserve and being loaned out twice to get first team experience.

Dawes joined Matlock Town on loan for another month on 7 November 2014. Dawes' loan spell with Matlock Town was soon extended for another month. After finishing his loan spell at Matlock Town, Dawes was loaned out to Stalybridge Celtic for the second time this season for another month. Just one appearance, Dawes made his return to his parent club.

On 17 May 2015, Dawes was released by Chesterfield, having spent one season at the club since signing from Sheffield Wednesday. Following his release, Dawes has played in non-league for Matlock Town, Sheffield and Worksop Town.

== Career statistics ==
As of match played 2 September 2014

Appearances and goals by club, season and competition
Club	Season	League			FA Cup		League Cup		Other		Total	
Club	Season	Division	Apps	Goals	Apps	Goals	Apps	Goals	Apps	Goals	Apps	Goals
Chesterfield	2014–15	League One	0	0	0	0	0	0	1	0	1	0
Career total			0	0	0	0	0	0	1	0	1	0
