= Steve Norris (footballer) =

English footballer

Personal information
- Full name: Stephen Mark Norris
- Date of birth: 22 September 1961 (age 65)
- Place of birth: Coventry, England
- Position: Forward

Senior career*
| Years | Team | Apps | (Gls) |
| 1983–1987 | VS Rugby | ? | (?) |
| 1987–1988 | Telford United | 41 | (24) |
| 1988–1989 | Scarborough | 45 | (13) |
| 1989 | → Notts County (loan) | 1 | (0) |
| 1989–1990 | Carlisle United | 29 | (5) |
| 1990–1992 | Halifax Town | 56 | (35) |
| 1992–1995 | Chesterfield | 97 | (43) |
| 1994–1995 | → Scarborough (loan) | 8 | (4) |
| 1995 | VS Rugby | 10 | (10) |
| 1995–1996 | Worcester City | ? | (?) |
- * Club domestic league appearances and goals

Stephen Mark Norris (born 22 September 1961) is an English former professional footballer who played in the Football League, as a forward.
