= 2011–12 Chesterfield F.C. season =

Chesterfield F.C.
2011–12 season
- Chairman: Barrie Hubbard
- Manager: John Sheridan
- Stadium: b2net Stadium
- League One: 22nd (relegated)
- FA Cup: First round
- League Cup: First round
- Football League Trophy: Winners
- Top goalscorer: League: Leon Clarke (9); All: Jordan Bowery (12)
- Highest home attendance: 9,279 (vs. Sheffield Wednesday, 18 February 2012)
- Lowest home attendance: 5,087 (vs. Wycombe Wanderers, 9 April 2012)
- Average home league attendance: 6,530
| Home colours | Away colours | Third colours |

The 2011–12 season was the 145th season in the history of Chesterfield Football Club, an association football club based in Chesterfield, Derbyshire, England. The club played in League One, the third tier of English football, having been promoted to this level after a first-place finish in League Two during the previous season.

Following a 3–2 defeat to Yeovil Town in the penultimate match of the season, it was confirmed that Chesterfield had been relegated back to League Two, with the club eventually finishing 22nd. In cup competitions, the club were eliminated from the FA Cup and Football League Cup in the first round, but won the Football League Trophy, beating Swindon Town 2–0 in the final at Wembley Stadium.

== League table ==
| Pos | Team | Pld | W | D | L | GF | GA | GD | Pts | Promotion, qualification or relegation |
|---|---|---|---|---|---|---|---|---|---|---|
| 20 | Leyton Orient | 46 | 13 | 11 | 22 | 48 | 75 | −27 | 50 | |
| 21 | Wycombe Wanderers (R) | 46 | 11 | 10 | 25 | 65 | 88 | −23 | 43 | Relegation to Football League Two |
| 22 | Chesterfield (R) | 46 | 10 | 12 | 24 | 56 | 81 | −25 | 42 | Relegation to Football League Two |
| 23 | Exeter City (R) | 46 | 10 | 12 | 24 | 46 | 75 | −29 | 42 | Relegation to Football League Two |
| 24 | Rochdale (R) | 46 | 8 | 14 | 24 | 47 | 81 | −34 | 38 | Relegation to Football League Two |

Updated to match(es) played on 5 May 2012. Source: BBC Sport
Rules for classification: 1) Points; 2) Goal difference; 3) Number of goals scored
(R) Relegated

== Squad statistics ==
=== Appearances and goals ===
| No. | Pos | Nat | Player | Total | | League One | | FA Cup | | League Cup | | FL Trophy | |
| No. | Pos | Nat | Player | Apps | Goals | Apps | Goals | Apps | Goals | Apps | Goals | Apps | Goals |
|---|---|---|---|---|---|---|---|---|---|---|---|---|---|
| 1 | GK | (England) ENG | Tommy Lee | 40 | 0 | 35 | 0 | 0 | 0 | 1 | 0 | 4 | 0 |
| 2 | DF | (England) ENG | Neal Trotman | 24 | 1 | 23 | 1 | 1 | 0 | 0 | 0 | 0 | 0 |
| 3 | DF | (Scotland) SCO | Gregor Robertson | 14 | 0 | 11+1 | 0 | 0 | 0 | 0 | 0 | 2 | 0 |
| 4 | DF | (England) ENG | Jamie Lowry | 7 | 0 | 2+4 | 0 | 0 | 0 | 0 | 0 | 1 | 0 |
| 6 | DF | (Jamaica) JAM | Simon Ford | 23 | 0 | 18 | 0 | 0 | 0 | 0 | 0 | 4+1 | 0 |
| 7 | MF | (England) ENG | Mark Allott | 43 | 1 | 36 | 1 | 1 | 0 | 1 | 0 | 3+2 | 0 |
| 8 | MF | (Scotland) SCO | Derek Niven | 8 | 0 | 4+3 | 0 | 0 | 0 | 1 | 0 | 0 | 0 |
| 9 | FW | (England) ENG | Craig Westcarr | 43 | 11 | 32+6 | 8 | 1 | 0 | 0 | 0 | 2+2 | 3 |
| 10 | MF | (England) ENG | Danny Whitaker | 35 | 8 | 23+7 | 5 | 1 | 0 | 1 | 2 | 2+1 | 1 |
| 13 | GK | (Scotland) SCO | Greg Fleming | 11 | 0 | 9+1 | 0 | 0 | 0 | 0 | 0 | 1 | 0 |
| 14 | FW | (England) ENG | Jack Lester | 24 | 4 | 16+5 | 3 | 0 | 0 | 0 | 0 | 3 | 1 |
| 15 | DF | (Australia) AUS | Aaron Downes | 13 | 0 | 8+1 | 0 | 0 | 0 | 1 | 0 | 3 | 0 |
| 16 | MF | (France) FRA | Alexandre Mendy | 40 | 3 | 31+3 | 2 | 1 | 0 | 0 | 0 | 4+1 | 1 |
| 17 | MF | (England) ENG | Dean Morgan | 21 | 4 | 10+7 | 3 | 0 | 0 | 1 | 0 | 2+1 | 1 |
| 19 | FW | (England) ENG | Scott Boden | 31 | 5 | 7+19 | 4 | 0 | 0 | 1 | 0 | 2+2 | 1 |
| 21 | FW | (England) ENG | Jordan Bowery | 48 | 12 | 23+17 | 8 | 1 | 1 | 0+1 | 0 | 4+2 | 3 |
| 22 | MF | (France) FRA | Jimmy Juan | 8 | 1 | 6+1 | 1 | 0 | 0 | 0 | 0 | 1 | 0 |
| 23 | MF | (England) ENG | Mark Randall | 18 | 2 | 10+6 | 1 | 0 | 0 | 0 | 0 | 1+1 | 1 |
| 24 | MF | (England) ENG | Craig Clay | 8 | 0 | 0+5 | 0 | 0+1 | 0 | 0+1 | 0 | 1 | 0 |
| 25 | DF | (England) ENG | Drew Talbot | 51 | 2 | 43 | 2 | 1 | 0 | 1 | 0 | 6 | 0 |
| 27 | MF | (England) ENG | Tendayi Darikwa | 4 | 0 | 2+1 | 0 | 0 | 0 | 0 | 0 | 0+1 | 0 |
| 28 | DF | (Jamaica) JAM | Nathan Smith | 29 | 0 | 22+3 | 0 | 0+1 | 0 | 1 | 0 | 2 | 0 |
Players played for Chesterfield but left before the end of the season:
| 26 | FW | (England) ENG | Jordan Burrow | 0 | 0 | 0 | 0 | 0 | 0 | 0 | 0 | 0 | 0 |
| 5 | DF | (England) ENG | Dean Holden | 16 | 1 | 9+5 | 1 | 0 | 0 | 1 | 0 | 1 | 0 |
| 11 | MF | (Republic of Ireland) IRL | Dwayne Mattis | 11 | 0 | 6+1 | 0 | 1 | 0 | 1 | 0 | 1+1 | 0 |
Players who played on loan for Chesterfield and returned to their parent club:
| 26 | MF | (England) ENG | David Davis | 11 | 0 | 9 | 0 | 0 | 0 | 0 | 0 | 2 | 0 |
| 30 | MF | (Belgium) BEL | Franck Moussa | 11 | 4 | 10 | 4 | 0 | 0 | 0 | 0 | 1 | 0 |
| 18 | MF | (England) ENG | Lee Johnson | 13 | 0 | 11 | 0 | 0 | 0 | 0 | 0 | 2 | 0 |
| 18 | DF | (England) ENG | James Hurst | 13 | 0 | 10 | 0 | 0 | 0 | 0 | 0 | 3 | 0 |
| 33 | GK | (Sweden) SWE | Ole Soderberg | 4 | 0 | 2 | 0 | 1 | 0 | 0 | 0 | 1 | 0 |
| 34 | MF | (England) ENG | Tope Obadeyi | 6 | 0 | 3+2 | 0 | 0 | 0 | 0 | 0 | 1 | 0 |
| 22 | DF | (England) ENG | Jonathan Grounds | 16 | 0 | 13 | 0 | 1 | 0 | 0 | 0 | 2 | 0 |
| 11 | FW | (Nigeria) NGR | Nicky Ajose | 12 | 1 | 5+7 | 1 | 0 | 0 | 0 | 0 | 0 | 0 |
| 32 | DF | (England) ENG | Scott Griffiths | 4 | 0 | 3 | 0 | 0 | 0 | 0 | 0 | 1 | 0 |
| 5 | DF | (England) ENG | Josh Thompson | 23 | 1 | 20 | 1 | 0 | 0 | 0 | 0 | 3 | 0 |
| 31 | FW | (England) ENG | Leon Clarke | 16 | 9 | 14 | 9 | 1 | 0 | 0 | 0 | 0+1 | 0 |
| 12 | DF | (England) ENG | Liam Ridehalgh | 20 | 1 | 20 | 1 | 0 | 0 | 0 | 0 | 0 | 0 |

=== Top scorers ===
| Place | Position | Nation | Number | Name | League One | FA Cup | League Cup | FL Trophy | Total |
|---|---|---|---|---|---|---|---|---|---|
| 1 | FW | (England) | 21 | Jordan Bowery | 8 | 1 | 0 | 3 | 12 |
| 2 | FW | (England) | 9 | Craig Westcarr | 8 | 0 | 0 | 3 | 11 |
| 3 | FW | (England) | 31 | Leon Clarke | 9 | 0 | 0 | 0 | 9 |
| 4 | MF | (England) | 10 | Danny Whitaker | 5 | 0 | 2 | 1 | 8 |
| 5 | FW | (England) | 19 | Scott Boden | 4 | 0 | 0 | 1 | 5 |
| 6 | MF | (Belgium) | 30 | Franck Moussa | 4 | 0 | 0 | 0 | 4 |
| = | FW | (England) | 14 | Jack Lester | 3 | 0 | 0 | 1 | 4 |
| = | FW | (England) | 17 | Dean Morgan | 3 | 0 | 0 | 1 | 4 |
| 9 | MF | (France) | 16 | Alexandre Mendy | 2 | 0 | 0 | 1 | 3 |
| 10 | DF | (England) | 25 | Drew Talbot | 2 | 0 | 0 | 0 | 2 |
| = | MF | (England) | 23 | Mark Randall | 1 | 0 | 0 | 1 | 2 |
| 12 | DF | (England) | 5 | Dean Holden | 1 | 0 | 0 | 0 | 1 |
| = | MF | (France) | 22 | Jimmy Juan | 1 | 0 | 0 | 0 | 1 |
| = | DF | (England) | 5 | Josh Thompson | 1 | 0 | 0 | 0 | 1 |
| = | DF | (England) | 12 | Liam Ridehalgh | 1 | 0 | 0 | 0 | 1 |
| = | FW | (Nigeria) | 11 | Nicky Ajose | 1 | 0 | 0 | 0 | 1 |
| = | DF | (England) | 2 | Neal Trotman | 1 | 0 | 0 | 0 | 1 |
| = | MF | (England) | 7 | Mark Allott | 1 | 0 | 0 | 0 | 1 |
| | | | | TOTALS | 56 | 1 | 2 | 12 | 71 |

=== Disciplinary record ===
| Number | Nation | Position | Name | League One | | FA Cup | | League Cup | | FL Trophy | | Total | |
| Number | Nation | Position | Name | Yellow card | Red card | Yellow card | Red card | Yellow card | Red card | Yellow card | Red card | Yellow card | Red card |
| 7 | (England) | MF | Mark Allott | 4 | 0 | 0 | 0 | 1 | 0 | 1 | 0 | 6 | 0 |
| 14 | (England) | FW | Jack Lester | 4 | 0 | 0 | 0 | 0 | 0 | 1 | 0 | 5 | 0 |
| 26 | (England) | MF | David Davis | 2 | 0 | 0 | 0 | 0 | 0 | 2 | 0 | 4 | 0 |
| 5 | (England) | DF | Dean Holden | 2 | 0 | 0 | 0 | 0 | 0 | 1 | 0 | 3 | 0 |
| 25 | (England) | DF | Drew Talbot | 2 | 0 | 0 | 0 | 0 | 0 | 1 | 0 | 3 | 0 |
| 16 | (France) | MF | Alexandre Mendy | 2 | 0 | 0 | 0 | 0 | 0 | 1 | 0 | 3 | 0 |
| 2 | (England) | DF | Neal Trotman | 3 | 0 | 0 | 0 | 0 | 0 | 0 | 0 | 3 | 0 |
| 23 | (England) | MF | Mark Randall | 3 | 0 | 0 | 0 | 0 | 0 | 0 | 0 | 3 | 0 |
| 18 | (England) | MF | Lee Johnson | 2 | 0 | 0 | 0 | 0 | 0 | 0 | 1 | 2 | 1 |
| 11 | (Republic of Ireland) | MF | Dwayne Mattis | 1 | 0 | 0 | 0 | 0 | 0 | 1 | 0 | 2 | 0 |
| 28 | (Jamaica) | DF | Nathan Smith | 2 | 0 | 0 | 0 | 0 | 0 | 0 | 0 | 2 | 0 |
| 3 | (Scotland) | DF | Gregor Robertson | 1 | 0 | 0 | 0 | 0 | 0 | 1 | 0 | 2 | 0 |
| 18 | (England) | DF | James Hurst | 0 | 0 | 0 | 0 | 0 | 0 | 2 | 0 | 2 | 0 |
| 9 | (England) | FW | Craig Westcarr | 2 | 0 | 0 | 0 | 0 | 0 | 0 | 0 | 2 | 0 |
| 21 | (England) | FW | Jordan Bowery | 2 | 0 | 0 | 0 | 0 | 0 | 0 | 0 | 2 | 0 |
| 22 | (England) | DF | Jonathan Grounds | 1 | 0 | 0 | 0 | 0 | 0 | 0 | 0 | 1 | 0 |
| 15 | (Australia) | DF | Aaron Downes | 1 | 0 | 0 | 0 | 0 | 0 | 0 | 0 | 1 | 0 |
| 17 | (England) | FW | Dean Morgan | 1 | 0 | 0 | 0 | 0 | 0 | 0 | 0 | 1 | 0 |
| 5 | (England) | DF | Josh Thompson | 0 | 0 | 0 | 0 | 0 | 0 | 1 | 0 | 1 | 0 |
| 22 | (France) | MF | Jimmy Juan | 1 | 0 | 0 | 0 | 0 | 0 | 0 | 0 | 1 | 0 |
| 12 | (England) | DF | Liam Ridehalgh | 1 | 0 | 0 | 0 | 0 | 0 | 0 | 0 | 1 | 0 |
| 27 | (England) | MF | Tendayi Darikwa | 1 | 0 | 0 | 0 | 0 | 0 | 0 | 0 | 1 | 0 |
| | | | TOTALS | 38 | 0 | 0 | 0 | 1 | 0 | 12 | 1 | 51 | 1 |

== Results ==
=== Pre-season friendlies ===
| 15 July 2011 | Alfreton Town | 1–4 | Chesterfield | Impact Arena |
| 19:45 | Wilson | | Triallist; Bowery; Lester | Attendance: 1,303 |

| 23 July 2011 | Macclesfield Town | 1–1 | Chesterfield | Moss Rose |
| 15:00 | Sinclair 8' | | Bowery 39' |

| 26 July 2011 | Chesterfield | 2–2 | Coventry City | B2net Stadium |
| 19:45 | Morgan 51', 60' | | Hussey 40'; Jutkiewicz 52' | Attendance: 2,572 |

| 30 July 2011 | Chesterfield | 0–2 | Hull City | B2net Stadium |
| 15:00 | | | Fryatt 27'; Chester 72' | Attendance: 2,639 |

=== League One ===
| 6 August 2011 1 | Tranmere Rovers | 1–0 | Chesterfield | Prenton Park |
| 15:00 | Weir 74' | | | Attendance: 5,755 |

| 13 August 2011 2 | Chesterfield | 1–1 | Stevenage | B2net Stadium |
| 15:00 | Lester 90+7' | | Charles 40' | Attendance: 5,836 |

| 16 August 2011 3 | Chesterfield | 0–2 | Preston North End | B2net Stadium |
| 19:45 | | | Carlisle 17'; Nicholson 70' | Attendance: 6,706 |

| 20 August 2011 4 | Milton Keynes Dons | 6–2 | Chesterfield | Stadium:mk |
| 15:00 | S. Baldock 12', 59', 72'; Bowditch 61'; Chadwick 70'; O'Shea 86' (pen.) | | Boden 37', 67' | Attendance: 7,011 |

| 27 August 2011 5 | Exeter City | 2–1 | Chesterfield | St James Park |
| 15:00 | Archibald-Henville 16'; Nichols 82' | | Whitaker 33' (pen.) | Attendance: 4,113 |

| 3 September 2011 6 | Chesterfield | 0–0 | Leyton Orient | B2net Stadium |
| 15:00 | | | | Attendance: 6,197 |

| 10 September 2011 7 | Bournemouth | 0–3 | Chesterfield | Seward Stadium |
| 15:00 | | | Mendy 33'; Westcarr 59'; Clarke 71' | Attendance: 4,989 |

| 13 September 2011 8 | Chesterfield | 1–0 | Bury | B2net Stadium |
| 19:45 | Clarke 66' | | | Attendance: 5,727 |

| 17 September 2011 9 | Chesterfield | 4–1 | Carlisle United | B2net Stadium |
| 15:00 | Clarke 3', 26', 51'; Westcarr 65' | | Miller 20' | Attendance: 6,445 |

| 24 September 2011 10 | Charlton Athletic | 3–1 | Chesterfield | The Valley |
| 15:00 | Hayes 19'; Jackson 29'; Wright-Phillips 90+2' | | Whitaker 72' (pen.) | Attendance: 22,151 |

| 1 October 2011 11 | Chesterfield | 0–1 | Colchester United | B2net Stadium |
| 15:00 | | | Antonio 30' | Attendance: 6,295 |

| 8 October 2011 12 | Sheffield Wednesday | 3–1 | Chesterfield | Hillsborough Stadium |
| 15:00 | Buxton 17'; Madine 59'; Marshall 87' | | Clarke 79' | Attendance: 24,514 |

| 15 October 2011 13 | Chesterfield | 1–3 | Notts County | B2net Stadium |
| 15:00 | Westcarr 52' | | Burgess 21'; Judge 38'; Talbot 88' (o.g.) | Attendance: 8,342 |

| 22 October 2011 14 | Chesterfield | 2–3 | Hartlepool United | B2net Stadium |
| 15:00 | Clarke 10'; Holden 52' | | Murray 17'; Poole 19', 48' | Attendance: 5,937 |

| 25 October 2011 15 | Rochdale | 1–1 | Chesterfield | Spotland Stadium |
| 19:45 | Jones 74' | | Westcarr 36' | Attendance: 2,494 |

| 29 October 2011 16 | Brentford | 2–1 | Chesterfield | Griffin Park |
| 15:00 | Saunders 24'; Bennett 82' | | Clarke 27' | Attendance: 4,566 |

| 5 November 2011 17 | Chesterfield | 2–2 | Yeovil Town | B2net Stadium |
| 15:00 | Bowery 4', 55' | | Massey 29'; Allott 76' (o.g.) | Attendance: 5,882 |

| 19 November 2011 18 | Oldham Athletic | 5–2 | Chesterfield | Boundary Park |
| 15:00 | Lee 3'; Simpson 12', 17', 33'; Kuqi 58' | | Westcarr 30'; Clarke 87' | Attendance: 3,699 |

| 26 November 2011 19 | Chesterfield | 0–1 | Sheffield United | B2net Stadium |
| 13:00 | | | Evans 82' | Attendance: 9,259 |

| 10 December 2011 20 | Wycombe Wanderers | 3–2 | Chesterfield | B2net Stadium |
| 15:00 | McNamee 31'; Trotta 79'; Beavon 90+4' | | Morgan 4', 54' | Attendance: 4,320 |

| 17 December 2011 21 | Chesterfield | 1–1 | Walsall | B2net Stadium |
| 15:00 | Lester 90' | | Nicholls 29' | Attendance: 6,236 |

| 26 December 2011 22 | Huddersfield Town | 1–0 | Chesterfield | Galpharm Stadium |
| 15:00 | Rhodes 34' | | | Attendance: 15,380 |

| 31 December 2011 23 | Scunthorpe United | 2–2 | Chesterfield | Glanford Park |
| 13:00 | Canavan 24'; Ryan 90+2' | | Boden 48'; Westcarr 70' | Attendance: 4,456 |

| 2 January 2012 24 | Chesterfield | 1–1 | Oldham Athletic | B2net Stadium |
| 15:00 | Bowery 34' | | Smith 45+3' | Attendance: 6,723 |

| 7 January 2012 25 | Chesterfield | 0–2 | Exeter City | B2net Stadium |
| 15:00 | | | Logan 78'; Sercombe 87' | Attendance: 5,856 |

| 14 January 2012 26 | Leyton Orient | 1–1 | Chesterfield | Matchroom Stadium |
| 15:00 | Mooney 42' | | Davis (yellow card) 45+1'; Juan 69' | Attendance: 4,174 |

| 21 January 2012 27 | Colchester United | 1–2 | Chesterfield | Colchester Community Stadium |
| 15:00 | Gillespie 32' | | Lester 6'; Thompson 44' | Attendance: 3,312 |

| 27 January 2012 28 | Chesterfield | 1–0 | Bournemouth | B2net Stadium |
| 19:45 | Ridehalgh 55' | | Francis (yellow card) 39' | Attendance: 6,958 |

| 4 February 2012 29 | Carlisle United | 2–1 | Chesterfield | Brunton Park |
| 15:00 | Parker 75'; Zoko 84' | | Talbot 16' | Attendance: 4,313 |

| 14 February 2012 30 | Bury | 1–1 | Chesterfield | Gigg Lane |
| 19:45 | Schumacher 88' | | Ajose 41' | Attendance: 2,266 |

| 18 February 2012 31 | Chesterfield | 1–0 | Sheffield Wednesday | B2net Stadium |
| 13:00 | Morgan 78' (pen.) | | Lowe (yellow card) 20'; Bostock (yellow card) 87' | Attendance: 9,279 |

| 25 February 2012 32 | Notts County | 1–0 | Chesterfield | Meadow Lane |
| 15:00 | Harley (yellow card) 15'; Forte 80' | | Trotman (yellow card) 23' | Attendance: 8,257 |

| 28 February 2012 33 | Chesterfield | 0–4 | Charlton Athletic | B2net Stadium |
| 15:00 | | | Wright-Phillips 43', 56', 66'; Jackson 58' | Attendance: 6,405 |

| 3 March 2012 34 | Chesterfield | 1–0 | Tranmere Rovers | B2net Stadium |
| 15:00 | Bowery 75' | | | Attendance: 5,861 |

| 6 March 2012 35 | Preston North End | 0–0 | Chesterfield | Deepdale |
| 19:45 | | | | Attendance: 9,264 |

| 10 March 2012 36 | Stevenage | 2–2 | Chesterfield | Broadhall Way |
| 15:00 | Laird 76'; Reid 77' | | Trotman 12'; Bowery 22' | Attendance: 3,534 |

| 17 March 2012 37 | Chesterfield | 1–1 | MK Dons | B2net Stadium |
| 15:00 | Talbot 4' | | O'Shea 56' | Attendance: 6,444 |

| 20 March 2012 38 | Chesterfield | 0–2 | Huddesfield Town | B2net Stadium |
| 19:45 | | | Novak 23'; Rhodes 27' | Attendance: 6,916 |

| 28 March 2012 39 | Sheffield United | 4–1 | Chesterfield | Bramall Lane |
| 19:45 | Williamson 38'; Evans 49' (pen.) 60' 63' | | Moussa 44' | Attendance: 20,159 |

| 31 March 2012 40 | Chesterfield | 1–4 | Scunthorpe United | B2net Stadium |
| 15:00 | Westcarr 21' | | Robertson 28' 75'; Walker 65'; Barcham 81' | Attendance: 6,152 |

| 7 April 2012 41 | Walsall | 3–2 | Chesterfield | Bescot Stadium |
| 15:00 | Ledesma 27' 33'; Mantom 58' | | Moussa 20'; Randall 54' | Attendance: 4,051 |

| 9 April 2012 42 | Chesterfield | 4–0 | Wycombe Wanderers | B2net Stadium |
| 15:00 | Westcarr 29'; Moussa 47'; Mendy 52'; Bowery 79' | | | Attendance: 5,087 |

| 14 April 2012 43 | Hartlepool United | 1–2 | Chesterfield | Victoria Park |
| 15:00 | Liddle 37' | | Whitaker 59'; Bowery 69' | Attendance: 4,004 |

| 21 April 2012 44 | Chesterfield | 2–1 | Rochdale | B2net Stadium |
| 15:00 | Randall (yellow card) 44'; Bowery (yellow card) 76'; Boden 81'; Whitaker 86' | | Widdowson (yellow card) 52'; Akpa Akpro 73' | Attendance: 5,954 |

| 28 April 2012 45 | Yeovil Town | 3–2 | Chesterfield | Huish Park |
| 15:00 | Blizzard 26'; Agard 73'; Williams 80' | | Bowery 8'; Whitaker 69' | Attendance: 4,563 |

| 5 May 2012 46 | Chesterfield | 2–3 | Brentford | B2net Stadium |
| 15:00 | Moussa 69'; Darikwa (yellow card) 76'; Allott 90+3' | | Legge 12'; Diagouraga 59'; Donaldson 80' | Attendance: 5,699 |

=== FA Cup ===
| 12 November 2011 First round | Chesterfield | 1–3 | Torquay United | Chesterfield |
| 15:00 | Bowery 59' | Summary | Stevens 20'; Morris (yellow card) 62'; Howe 72'; Nicholson 88' | Stadium: B2net Stadium; Attendance: 4,332; Referee: Carl Berry |

=== League Cup ===
| 9 August 2011 Round 1 | Rochdale | 3–2 (a.e.t.) | Chesterfield | Spotland Stadium |
| 19:45 | Grimes 19', 111'; Mattis 103' (o.g.) | | Whitaker 11', 95' (pen.) | Attendance: 1,718 |

=== FL Trophy ===
| 4 October 2011 Second round | Notts County | 1–3 | Chesterfield | Nottingham |
| 19:45 | Hawley 43' | Report | Johnson (red card) 22'; Randall 64'; Morgan 68'; Bowery 77' | Stadium: Meadow Lane; Attendance: 2,293; Referee: David Webb |

| 9 November 2011 Quarter final | Chesterfield | 4–3 | Tranmere Rovers | B2net Stadium |
| 19:45 | Mendy 44'; Bowery 54', 80'; Westcarr 90+2' | | McGurk 9'; Showunmi 70'; Tiryaki 72' | Attendance: 3,152 |

| 6 December 2011 Semi final | Preston North End | 1–1 (2–4 p) | Chesterfield | Deepdale |
| 19:45 | McCombe 16' | | Westcarr 27' | Attendance: 5,835 |
| | Penalties |
| | Parry (penalty scored); Mellor (penalty scored); Alexander (penalty missed); Coutts (penalty missed) | | (penalty missed) Westcarr; (penalty scored) Whitaker; (penalty scored) Clarke; (penalty scored) Morgan; (penalty scored) Mendy |

| 18 January 2012 Northern Final Leg 1 | Chesterfield | 2–1 | Oldham Athletic | B2net Stadium |
| 19:45 | Boden 49'; Thompson (yellow card) 52'; Hurst (yellow card) 53'; Whitaker 67' (pen.); Davis (yellow card) 71'; Lester (yellow card) 79' | | Simpson 58' | Attendance: 5,724 |

| 30 January 2012 Northern Final Leg 2 | Oldham Athletic | 0–1 (1–3 agg.) | Chesterfield | Boundary Park |
| 19:45 | Simpson (yellow card) 69' | | Robertson (yellow card) 38'; Hurst (yellow card) 62'; Allott (yellow card) 66'; Davis (yellow card) 76'; Lester 88' | Attendance: 5,622 |

| 25 March 2012 Final | Chesterfield | 2–0 | Swindon Town | Wembley Stadium |
| 14:00 | Risser 47' (o.g.); Westcarr 90+4' | | | Attendance: 49,602 |

== Transfers ==
Players transferred in
| Date | Pos. | Name | Previous club | Fee | Ref. |
|---|---|---|---|---|---|
| 16 June 2011 | DF | (Jamaica) Nathan Smith | (England) Yeovil Town | Free | |
| 24 June 2011 | MF | (England) Mark Randall | (England) Arsenal | Free | |
| 29 July 2011 | GK | (Scotland) Greg Fleming | (England) Oldham Athletic | Free | |
| 26 August 2011 | FW | (England) Craig Westcarr | (England) Notts County | Undisclosed | |
| 31 August 2011 | MF | (France) Alex Mendy | (Czech Republic) Mladá Boleslav | Free | |
| 19 December 2011 | MF | (France) Jimmy Juan | (France) Grenoble | Free | |
| 3 January 2012 | DF | (England) Neal Trotman | (England) Rochdale | Free | |
Players loaned in
| Date from | Pos. | Name | From | Date to | Ref. |
| 25 August 2011 | DF | (England) Jonathan Grounds | (England) Middlesbrough | 25 September 2011 | |
| 26 August 2011 | MF | (England) Lee Johnson | (England) Bristol City | November 2011 | |
| 8 September 2011 | FW | (England) Leon Clarke | (England) Swindon Town | 9 December 2011 | |
| 16 September 2011 | GK | (England) Adam Smith | (England) Leicester City | 16 October 2011 | |
| 3 November 2011 | GK | (Sweden) Ole Söderberg | (England) Newcastle United | 10 December 2011 | |
| 3 November 2011 | DF | (England) Neal Trotman | (England) Rochdale | January 2012 | |
| 8 November 2011 | FW | (England) Tope Obadeyi | (England) Bolton Wanderers | 26 December 2011 | |
| 25 November 2011 | DF | (England) Scott Griffiths | (England) Peterborough United | 2 January 2012 | |
| 5 January 2012 | DF | (England) Liam Ridehalgh | (England) Huddersfield Town | End of season | |
| 11 January 2012 | DF | (England) James Hurst | (England) West Bromwich Albion | End of season | |
| 13 January 2012 | MF | (England) David Davis | (England) Wolverhampton Wanderers | 9 March 2012 | |
| 17 January 2012 | DF | (England) Josh Thompson | (Scotland) Celtic | End of season | |
| 31 January 2012 | FW | (Nigeria) Nicky Ajose | (England) Peterborough United | End of season | |
| 16 March 2012 | MF | (Belgium) Franck Moussa | (England) Leicester City | End of season | |
Players loaned out
| Date from | Pos. | Name | To | Date to | Ref. |
| 21 September 2011 | FW | (England) Jordan Burrow | (England) Boston United | 2 January 2012 | |
| 9 September 2011 | FW | (England) Scott Boden | (England) Macclesfield Town | 9 December 2011 | |
| 28 October 2011 | MF | (Scotland) Derek Niven | (England) Northampton Town | 28 November 2011 | |
| 3 November 2011 | DF | (England) Dean Holden | (England) Rochdale | 2 January 2012 | |
| 9 November 2011 | DF | (England) Dan Gray | (England) Macclesfield Town | 9 December 2011 | |
| 24 November 2011 | MF | (England) Jamie Lowry | (England) Crewe Alexandra | 30 January 2012 | |
| 1 January 2012 | DF | (Australia) Aaron Downes | (England) Crewe Alexandra | End of season | |
| 21 January 2012 | DF | (England) Craig Clay | (England) Alfreton Town | End of season | |
| 21 January 2012 | MF | (England) Tendayi Darikwa | (England) Hinckley United | End of season | |
| 8 March 2012 | FW | (England) Dean Morgan | (England) Oxford United | End of season | |
Players released
| Date | Pos. | Name | To | Date to | Ref. |
| 7 June 2011 | FW | (Wales) Craig Davies | (England) Barnsley | 1 July 2011 (Bosman) | |
| 1 July 2011 | GK | (Republic of Ireland) Shane Redmond | (England) Mansfield Town | 1 July 2011 | |
| 1 July 2011 | DF | (England) Ian Breckin | Unattached | | |
| 3 January 2012 | DF | (England) Dean Holden | (England) Rochdale | 3 January 2012 | |
| 1 January 2012 | FW | (England) Jordan Burrow | (England) Morecambe | 21 January 2012 | |
| 1 January 2012 | MF | (England) Ben Watkis | (England) Matlock Town | 29 March 2012 | |
| 1 January 2012 | DF | (England) Matt Needham | Unattached | | |
| 20 January 2012 | MF | (Republic of Ireland) Dwayne Mattis | (England) Macclesfield Town | 20 January 2012 | |

== Awards ==
| End of Season Awards | Winner |
|---|---|
| Player of the Year | Tommy Lee |
| Players' Player of the Year | Tommy Lee |
| Young Player of the Year | Jack Broadhead |
| Goal of the Season | Danny Whitaker vs Hartlepool United |
