= Jordan Burrow =

English footballer (born 1992)

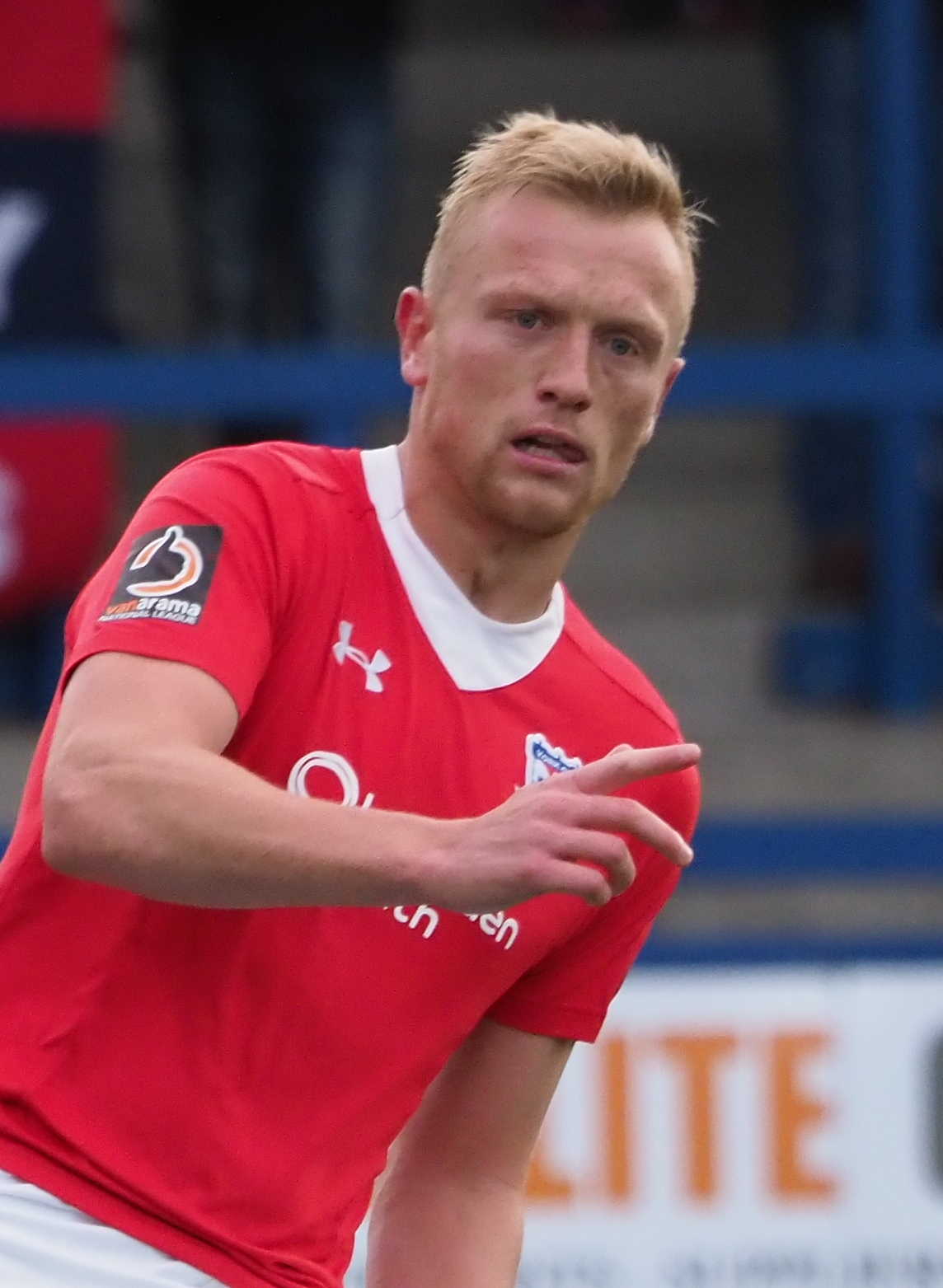
- Burrow playing for York City in 2018

Personal information
- Full name: Jordan Burrow
- Date of birth: 12 September 1992 (age 34)
- Place of birth: Sheffield, England
- Height: 6 ft 1 in (1.85 m)
- Position: Striker

Team information
- Current team: Worksop Town

Youth career
- –2011: Chesterfield

Senior career*
Years	Team	Apps	(Gls)
2011	Chesterfield	0	(0)
2011	→ Boston United (loan)	8	(2)
2012–2013	Morecambe	51	(5)
2013–2014	Stevenage	20	(2)
2014–2015	Lincoln City	39	(10)
2015–2016	FC Halifax Town	53	(14)
2016–2018	Gateshead	68	(15)
2018–2020	York City	73	(28)
2020–2023	Boston United	58	(11)
2023	Buxton	20	(4)
2023–	Worksop Town	38	(16)

International career
2014–2015	England C	3	(0)
- * Club domestic league appearances and goals as of 17:43, 25 November 2024 (UTC)

Jordan Burrow (born 12 September 1992) is an English professional footballer who plays as a striker for National League North club Worksop Town. He has played in the Football League for Morecambe and Stevenage.

A product of Chesterfield's youth system, Burrow joined the club aged seven and went on to sign his first professional contract with the club in May 2011. He spent the opening months of the 2011–12 season on loan at Conference North club Boston United. On his return to Chesterfield in December that year, he was released by the club, having made no first-team appearances. He subsequently signed for Morecambe of League Two in January 2012, and made over 50 appearances during his 18-month stay with the club. In May 2013, Burrow signed for League One club Stevenage.

== Club career ==
=== Chesterfield ===
Burrow was born in Sheffield, South Yorkshire. He began his career at Chesterfield at the age of seven and progressed through the various youth ranks over an eleven-year period. Having played regularly for the club's reserve team during the 2010–11 season, scoring 26 goals that year, he signed his first professional contract with Chesterfield in May 2011, agreeing a six-month contract. A month into 2011–12, Burrow joined Conference North club Boston United on 21 September 2011 on a one-month loan agreement to gain first-team experience. Boston managers Lee Canoville and Jason Lee had previously been to watch the player, and managed to acquire Burrow's services after Jason Lee spoke to former teammate and Chesterfield goalkeeping coach Mark Crossley about the possibility of a loan move. He made his debut three days after signing, on 24 September, coming on as a 54th-minute substitute and scoring the winning goal in a 2–1 home victory over Droylsden with a looping header. His loan was subsequently extended for a further month in October 2011, and he went on to make 11 appearances during his two-month stay at Boston. Burrow returned to Chesterfield in December, but was released from his contract later that month having made no first-team appearances for the club.

=== Morecambe ===
Following his release from Chesterfield, Burrow went on trial with League Two club Morecambe and played in a number of reserve matches during the opening weeks of January 2012. The trial proved to be successful, and he joined the club on an 18-month contract on 21 January 2012. Burrow made his first-team debut on 11 February 2012, in a 2–1 defeat away to Bristol Rovers, coming on as a 72nd-minute substitute. He subsequently made his first start three days later, playing the first 77 minutes as Morecambe secured a 1–0 home win over Macclesfield Town. He scored his first goal for the club shortly after, bundling in Lewis Alessandra's left-wing free kick to score the only goal in a 1–0 home victory against Southend United. Burrow ended the season in good goalscoring form, scoring in consecutive 3–2 away defeats to Burton Albion and Rotherham United, before scoring a headed goal in a 2–2 home draw with Plymouth Argyle to make it three goals in four matches. He scored four times in 19 appearances for Morecambe in the 2011–12 season.

He remained at Morecambe for 2012–13, and started in the club's first match of the season on 12 August 2012 as they secured a 2–1 win over Championship team Blackpool at Bloomfield Road in the League Cup. Burrow suffered knee ligament damage in Morecambe's 4–1 home win over Barnet on 10 November 2012, and was expected to be out of first-team action for three months. However, he returned to face his former club, Chesterfield, just five weeks later, appearing as a 79th-minute substitute in 1–1 away draw. Burrow scored his only goal of the season on 8 January 2013, netting from close range in Morecambe's 2–1 home victory over Dagenham Redbridge, a match that was played in front of the club's biggest crowd of the season. He only scored once in 35 appearances in 2012–13.

=== Stevenage ===
Shortly after the end of the season, Burrow rejected Morecambe's offer of a new contract on reduced terms and opted to sign for League One club Stevenage on a two-year contract 31 May 2013. He made a goalscoring debut for Stevenage on 6 August 2013, converting Luke Freeman's low cross from close range in a 2–0 home victory over Championship team Ipswich Town in the League Cup. Burrow was released by Stevenage at the end of 2013–14.

=== Lincoln City ===
Burrow signed for Conference Premier club Lincoln City on 21 May 2014 on a two-year contract. He made his debut in a 0–0 home draw with Kidderminster Harriers on 9 August 2014 and scored his first goal three days later in a 2–1 win away to Altrincham. He was made available for transfer by Lincoln at the end of 2014–15, before having his contract cancelled by mutual consent on 24 June 2015.

=== Return to non-League ===
Burrow signed for National League North club York City on 9 May 2018.

In August 2020, Burrow returned to former club Boston United having previously spent time with the club on loan in 2011.

In May 2023, Burrow joined National League North club Buxton, reuniting with former manager Craig Elliott whom he had played under at Boston United. On 16 December 2023, he joined Northern Premier League Premier Division club Worksop Town.

== International career ==
Burrow made three appearances for the England national C team from 2014 to 2015.

== Career statistics ==
As of match played 25 November 2023

Appearances and goals by club, season and competition
Club	Season	League			FA Cup		League Cup		Other		Total	
Club	Season	Division	Apps	Goals	Apps	Goals	Apps	Goals	Apps	Goals	Apps	Goals
Chesterfield	2011–12	League One	0	0	—		0	0	0	0	0	0
Boston United (loan)	2011–12	Conference North	8	2	2	0	—		1 (Note: Appearance(s) in FA Trophy)	0	11	2
Morecambe	2011–12	League Two	19	4	—		—		—		19	4
Morecambe	2012–13	League Two	32	1	0	0	1	0	2 (Note: Appearance(s) in Football League Trophy)	0	35	1
Morecambe	Total		51	5	0	0	1	0	2	0	54	5
Stevenage	2013–14	League One	20	2	1	0	1	1	1	0	23	3
Lincoln City	2014–15	Conference Premier	39	10	3	0	—		1	0	43	10
FC Halifax Town	2015–16	National League	45	14	3	0	—		8	4	56	18
FC Halifax Town	2016–17	National League North	8	0	2	0	—		—		10	0
FC Halifax Town	Total		53	14	5	0	—		8	4	66	18
Gateshead	2016–17	National League	23	6	—		—		2	2	25	8
Gateshead	2017–18	National League	45	9	3	2	—		9	3	57	14
Gateshead	Total		68	15	3	2	—		11	5	82	22
York City	2018–19	National League North	40	13	4	4	—		2	2	46	19
York City	2019–20	National League North	33	15	4	0	—		1	0	38	15
York City	Total		73	28	8	4	—		3	2	84	34
Buxton	2023–24	National League North	20	4	0	0	—		1	0	21	4
Career total			332	80	22	6	2	1	28	11	384	98

== Honours ==
FC Halifax Town

- FA Trophy: 2015–16
