= 2010–11 Chesterfield F.C. season =

Chesterfield F.C.
2010–11 season
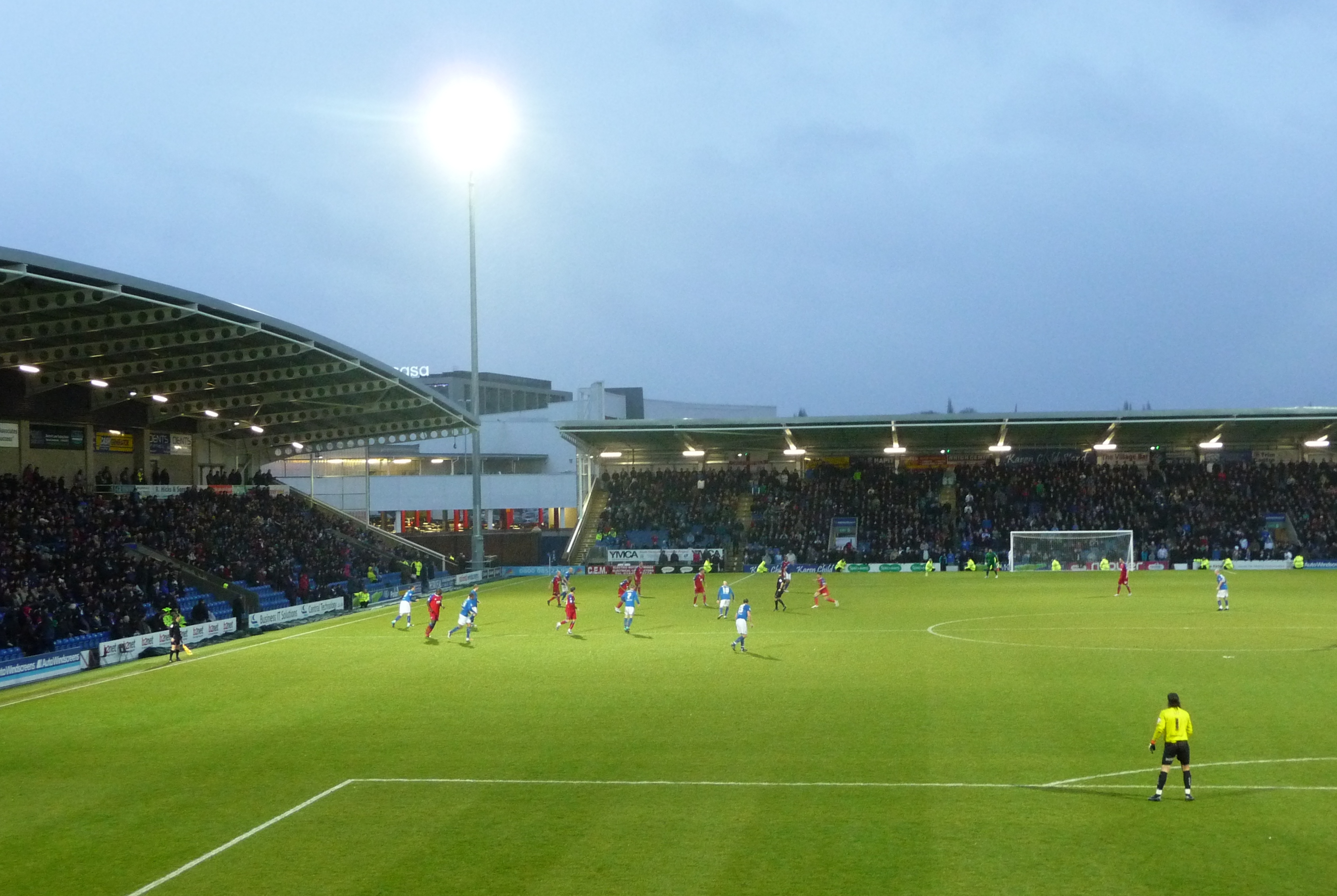
- Chesterfield in action against Aldershot Town, February 2011
- Chairman: Barrie Hubbard
- Manager: John Sheridan
- Football League Two: Champions
- FA Cup: First Round
- League Cup: First round
- Football League Trophy: Second round
- Top goalscorer: League: Craig Davies (23); All: Craig Davies (25)
- Highest home attendance: 10,089 vs. Rotherham United, 18 March 2011
- Lowest home attendance: 4,801 vs. Torquay United, 11 December 2010
- Average home league attendance: 6,972

Chesterfield F.C. is an English football club based in Chesterfield, Derbyshire. During the 2010–11 season, the club competed in League Two, the fourth tier of English football, for the fourth year in succession. The club finished the season as champions, earning automatic promotion to League One.

== Competitions ==
=== Football League Two ===
==== League table ====
| Pos | Team | Pld | W | D | L | GF | GA | GD | Pts | Promotion, qualification or relegation |
|---|---|---|---|---|---|---|---|---|---|---|
| 1 | Chesterfield (C, P) | 46 | 24 | 14 | 8 | 85 | 51 | +34 | 86 | Promotion to League One |
| 2 | Bury (P) | 46 | 23 | 12 | 11 | 82 | 50 | +32 | 81 | Promotion to League One |
| 3 | Wycombe Wanderers (P) | 46 | 22 | 14 | 10 | 69 | 50 | +19 | 80 | Promotion to League One |
| 4 | Shrewsbury Town | 46 | 22 | 13 | 11 | 72 | 49 | +23 | 79 | Qualification to League Two play-offs |
| 5 | Accrington Stanley | 46 | 18 | 19 | 9 | 73 | 55 | +18 | 73 | Qualification to League Two play-offs |

Updated to match(es) played on 28 May 2011. Source: The Football League
Rules for classification: 1) points; 2) goal difference; 3) number of goals scored.
(C) Champions; (P) Promoted

==== Matches ====
League Two match details
| Date | League position | Opponents | Venue | Result | Score F–A | Scorers | Attendance | Ref. |
|---|---|---|---|---|---|---|---|---|
| 7 August 2010 | 4th | Barnet | H | W | 2–1 | Mattis 24', Lester 59' | 6,431 | |
| 14 August 2010 | 5th | Port Vale | A | D | 1–1 | Mattis 79' | 6,444 | |
| 21 August 2010 | 2nd | Hereford United | H | W | 4–0 | Whitaker 9' pen., 33', 60', Ford 63' | 4,970 | |
| 28 August 2010 | 4th | Macclesfield Town | A | D | 1–1 | Davies 66' | 2,176 | |
| 4 September 2010 | 3rd | Lincoln City | H | W | 2–1 | Mattis 36', Davies 62' | 6,429 | |
| 11 September 2010 | 4th | Morecambe | A | D | 1–1 | Boden 83' | 2,323 | |
| 18 September 2010 | 3rd | Cheltenham Town | H | W | 3–0 | Talbot 14, Davies 48', 66' | 5,503 | |
| 25 September 2010 | 4th | Rotherham United | A | L | 0–1 | | 5,365 | |
| 28 September 2010 | 2nd | Northampton Town | A | W | 2–1 | D. Morgan 71', Davies 75' | 4,025 | |
| 2 October 2010 | 2nd | Crewe Alexandra | H | D | 5–5 | Lester 23', 74', Whitaker 79' pen., 89' pen., Clay 90' | 6,047 | |
| 9 October 2010 | 2nd | Southend United | H | W | 2–1 | Whitaker 27' pen., Boden 90' | 6,557 | |
| 16 October 2010 | 1st | Wycombe Wanderers | A | W | 2–1 | Davies 27', 73' | 5,211 | |
| 23 October 2010 | 1st | Shrewsbury Town | H | W | 4–3 | Talbot 29', Lester 42', Davies 45', 62' | 7,777 | |
| 30 October 2010 | 1st | Stevenage | A | D | 0–0 | | 3,556 | |
| 2 November 2010 | 1st | Accrington Stanley | H | W | 5–2 | Davies 8', 88', Whitaker 41' pen., 56', Lester 42' | 6,034 | |
| 13 November 2010 | 1st | Burton Albion | H | L | 1–2 | Niven 44' | 7,864 | |
| 20 November 2010 | 1st | Aldershot Town | A | W | 2–0 | Davies 61', Whitaker 63' | 2,479 | |
| 23 November 2010 | 2nd | Oxford United | H | L | 1–2 | Morris 14' | 5,929 | |
| 11 December 2010 | 1st | Torquay United | H | W | 1–0 | Lester 28' | 4,801 | |
| 1 January 2011 | 1st | Stockport County | H | W | 4–1 | Lester 13', 62', 67', Davies 90' | 7,542 | |
| 3 January 2011 | 1st | Accrington Stanley | A | D | 2–2 | Smalley 88', Boden 90' | 2,041 | |
| 8 January 2011 | 1st | Southend United | A | W | 3–2 | Whitaker 12' pen., 62' pen., Smalley 19' | 4,922 | |
| 15 January 2011 | 1st | Stevenage | H | W | 1–0 | Talbot 42' | 6,219 | |
| 22 January 2011 | 1st | Shrewsbury Town | A | D | 0–0 | | 6,483 | |
| 25 January 2011 | 1st | Gillingham | A | W | 2–0 | Smalley 13', 49' | 4,770 | |
| 29 January 2011 | 1st | Bradford City | H | D | 2–2 | Whitaker 11', Bowery 90' | 7,556 | |
| 1 February 2011 | 1st | Stockport County | A | D | 1–1 | Smalley 74' | 4,092 | |
| 5 February 2011 | 1st | Aldershot Town | H | D | 2–2 | Smalley 7', 84' | 5,669 | |
| 11 February 2011 | 1st | Burton Albion | A | L | 0–1 | | 4,260 | |
| 15 February 2011 | 1st | Bury | A | D | 1–1 | Davies 20' | 2,517 | |
| 19 February 2011 | 1st | Lincoln City | A | W | 2–0 | Davies 15', Holden 84' | 4,172 | |
| 22 February 2011 | 1st | Bradford City | A | W | 1–0 | Smalley 16' | 10,782 | |
| 26 February 2011 | 1st | Morcambe | H | L | 0–2 | | 6,441 | |
| 1 March 2011 | 1st | Wycombe Wanderers | H | W | 4–1 | Smalley 27', Whitaker 36' pen., Lester 46', Davies 88' | 6,392 | |
| 5 March 2011 | 1st | Cheltenham Town | A | W | 3–0 | Davies 34', 87', Djilali 47' | 2,870 | |
| 8 March 2011 | 1st | Northampton Town | H | W | 2–1 | Davies 63', Lester 68' | 5,661 | |
| 12 March 2011 | 1st | Crewe Alexandra | A | L | 0–2 | | 4,503 | |
| 18 March 2011 | 1st | Rotherham United | H | W | 5–0 | Holden 21', Davies 31', Lester 45+1', 81', 83' | 10,089 | |
| 26 March 2011 | 1st | Barnet | A | D | 2–2 | Smalley 21', Davies 46' | 2,012 | |
| 2 April 2011 | 1st | Port Vale | H | W | 2–0 | Lester 48', Smalley 71' | 8,606 | |
| 9 April 2011 | 1st | Hereford United | A | L | 0–3 | | 2,492 | |
| 16 April 2011 | 1st | Macclesfield Town | H | W | 2–1 | Davies 60', Whitaker 76' | 8,206 | |
| 23 April 2011 | 1st | Oxford United | A | D | 0–0 | | 8,195 | |
| 25 April 2011 | 1st | Bury | H | L | 2–3 | Davies 50', Lester 63' | 9,614 | |
| 29 April 2011 | 1st | Torquay United | A | D | 0–0 | | 5,002 | |
| 7 May 2011 | 1st | Gillingham | H | W | 3–1 | Whitaker 54', Lester 76', Smalley 82' | 10,023 | |

=== FA Cup ===
FA Cup match details
| Round | Date | Opponents | Venue | Result | Score F–A | Scorers | Attendance | Ref |
|---|---|---|---|---|---|---|---|---|
| First round | 6 November 2010 | Harrow Borough | A | W | 2–0 | Boden 74', Davies 90+3' | 2,500 | |
| Second round | 27 November 2010 | Burton Albion | A | L | 1–3 | Bowery 90+1' | 3,881 | |

=== League Cup ===
League Cup match details
| Round | Date | Opponents | Venue | Result | Score F–A | Scorers | Attendance | Ref |
|---|---|---|---|---|---|---|---|---|
| First round | 10 August 2010 | Middlesbrough | H | L | 1–2 | Mattis 68' | 6,509 | |

=== Football League Trophy ===
Football League Trophy match details
| Round | Date | Opponents | Venue | Result | Score F–A | Scorers | Attendance | Ref |
|---|---|---|---|---|---|---|---|---|
| First round | 31 August 2010 | Walsall | A | W | 2–1 | Bowery 33', D. Morgan 33' | 1,793 | |
| Second round | 6 October 2010 | Sheffield Wednesday | A | D | 2–2 a.e.t. 7–8 pens. | D. Morgan 10', Davies 84' | 15,003 | |

== Appearances and goals ==
As of 6 May 2011.
(Substitute appearances in brackets)

| No. | Pos. | Name | League | | FA Cup | | League Cup | | League Trophy | | Total | | Discipline | |
| No. | Pos. | Name | Apps | Goals | Apps | Goals | Apps | Goals | Apps | Goals | Apps | Goals | Yellow card | Red card |
|---|---|---|---|---|---|---|---|---|---|---|---|---|---|---|
| 1 | GK | (England) Tommy Lee | 46 | 0 | 2 | 0 | 1 | 0 | 2 | 0 | 51 | 0 | 2 | 0 |
| 2 | DF | (England) Kelvin Lomax | 3 (1) | 0 | 1 | 0 | 0 | 0 | 0 | 0 | 4 (1) | 0 | 0 | 0 |
| 3 | DF | (Scotland) Gregor Robertson | 21 | 0 | 2 | 0 | 0 | 0 | 0 | 0 | 23 | 0 | 1 | 0 |
| 4 | MF | (England) Jamie Lowry | 0 (3) | 0 | 0 | 0 | 0 | 0 | 0 | 0 | 0 (3) | 0 | 0 | 0 |
| 5 | DF | (Wales) Rob Page | 0 (1) | 0 | 0 | 0 | 1 | 0 | 0 | 0 | 1 (1) | 1 | 0 | 0 |
| 6 | DF | (Jamaica) Simon Ford | 31 | 1 | 1 | 0 | 1 | 0 | 2 | 0 | 35 | 1 | 0 | 0 |
| 7 | MF | (England) Mark Allott | 33 (3) | 0 | 2 | 0 | 1 | 0 | 1 | 0 | 37 (3) | 0 | 4 | 0 |
| 8 | MF | (Scotland) Derek Niven | 24 (11) | 1 | 0 (1) | 0 | 0 (1) | 0 | 2 | 0 | 26 (13) | 1 | 7 | 1 |
| 9 | FW | (Wales) Craig Davies | 41 | 23 | 1 (1) | 1 | 0 | 0 | 2 | 1 | 0 (6) | 25 | 9 | 1 |
| 10 | MF | (England) Danny Whitaker | 43 (3) | 15 | 2 | 0 | 1 | 0 | 1 (1) | 0 | 47 (4) | 15 | 4 | 0 |
| 11 | MF | (Republic of Ireland) Dwayne Mattis | 35 (3) | 3 | 2 | 0 | 1 | 1 | 2 | 0 | 40 (3) | 4 | 7 | 0 |
| 12 | DF | (England) Scott Griffiths | 28 (1) | 0 | 1 | 0 | 1 | 0 | 2 | 0 | 32 (1) | 0 | 1 | 0 |
| 14 | FW | (England) Jack Lester | 29 (11) | 17 | 1 | 0 | 1 | 0 | 0 (1) | 0 | 31 (12) | 17 | 3 | 0 |
| 16 | DF | (England) Ian Breckin | 19 (6) | 0 | 0 (1) | 0 | 1 | 0 | 0 | 0 | 20 (7) | 0 | 4 | 0 |
| 17 | FW | (England) Dean Morgan | 18 (3) | 1 | 0 (1) | 0 | 0 | 0 | 2 | 2 | 20 (4) | 3 | 4 | 0 |
| 18 | MF | (Republic of Ireland) Ian Morris | 13 (6) | 1 | 1 | 0 | 0 | 0 | 0 | 0 | 14 (6) | 1 | 3 | 0 |
| 19 | FW | (England) Scott Boden | 2 (21) | 3 | 1 | 1 | 0 | 0 | 0 (1) | 0 | 3 (22) | 4 | 0 | 0 |
| 20 | DF | (England) Dan Gray | 1 (1) | 0 | 1 | 0 | 0 | 0 | 0 | 0 | 2 (1) | 0 | 0 | 0 |
| 21 | FW | (England) Jordan Bowery | 5 (22) | 1 | 1 (1) | 1 | 0 | 0 | 2 | 1 | 8 (23) | 3 | 0 | 0 |
| 22 | FW | (England) Deane Smalley | 22 (6) | 12 | 1 | 0 | 0 | 0 | 0 | 0 | 23 (6) | 12 | 2 | 1 |
| 23 | DF | (England) Jack Hunt | 18 (2) | 0 | 0 | 0 | 1 | 0 | 2 | 0 | 21 (2) | 0 | 6 | 0 |
| 24 | MF | (England) Craig Clay | 1 (2) | 1 | 0 | 0 | 1 | 0 | 0 (1) | 0 | 2 (2) | 1 | 0 | 0 |
| 25 | MF | (England) Drew Talbot | 44 | 3 | 2 | 0 | 0 | 0 | 2 | 0 | 48 | 3 | 0 | 0 |
| 27 | MF | (England) Tendayi Darikwa | 0 | 0 | 0 (1) | 0 | 0 | 0 | 0 | 0 | 0 (1) | 0 | 0 | 0 |
| 30 | MF | (England) Kieron Djilali | 7 (3) | 1 | 0 | 0 | 0 | 0 | 0 | 0 | 7 (3) | 1 | 1 | 0 |
| 31 | DF | (England) Javan Vidal | 5 (1) | 0 | 0 | 0 | 0 | 0 | 0 | 0 | 5 (1) | 0 | 2 | 0 |
| 32 | DF | (England) Dean Holden | 17 | 2 | 0 | 0 | 0 | 0 | 0 | 0 | 17 | 2 | 3 | 0 |

== Awards ==
| End of Season Awards | Winner |
|---|---|
| Fans Player of the Season | Tommy Lee |
| Young Spireites' Player of the Season | Jack Lester |
| Players' Player of the Season | Drew Talbot |
| Young Player of the Season | Jacob Hazel |
| Goal of the Season | Deane Smalley (vs Bradford City, 22 February 2011) |

== Transfers ==
Players transferred in
| Date | Pos. | Name | From | Fee | Ref. |
|---|---|---|---|---|---|
| 21 May 2010 | MF | (Republic of Ireland) Dwayne Mattis | (England) Walsall | Free | |
| 27 May 2010 | MF | (England) Danny Whitaker | (England) Oldham Athletic | Free | |
| 21 June 2010 | DF | (Jamaica) Simon Ford | (Scotland) Kilmarnock | Free (Bosman) | |
| 7 July 2010 | FW | (Wales) Craig Davies | (England) Brighton & Hove Albion | Free | |
| 4 August 2010 | GK | (Republic of Ireland) Shane Redmond | (England) Nottingham Forest | Free | |
| 16 August 2010 | FW | (England) Dean Morgan | (England) Milton Keynes Dons | Free | |
| 3 February 2011 | DF | (Northern Ireland) Dean Holden | (England) Shrewsbury Town | Free | |
Players loaned in
| Date from | Pos. | Name | From | Date to | Ref. |
| 15 July 2010 | MF | (Republic of Ireland) Ian Morris | (England) Scunthorpe United | End of season | |
| 28 July 2010 | DF | (England) Jack Hunt | (England) Huddersfield Town | 10 January 2011 | |
| 6 August 2010 | DF | (England) Scott Griffiths | (England) Peterborough United | 6 November 2010 | |
| 1 November 2010 | DF | (England) Kelvin Lomax | (England) Oldham Athletic | 7 December 2010 | |
| 1 November 2010 | MF | (England) Deane Smalley | (England) Oldham Athletic | End of season | |
| 7 January 2011 | DF | (England) Scott Griffiths | (England) Peterborough United | End of season | |
| 20 January 2011 | DF | (England) Javan Vidal | (England) Manchester City | 26 February 2011 | |
| 14 February 2011 | MF | (England) Kieron Djilali | (England) Crystal Palace | End of season | |
Players loaned out
| Date from | Pos. | Name | To | Date to | Ref. |
| 29 July 2010 | FW | (Scotland) Martin Gritton | (England) Torquay United | 10 January 2011 | |
| 28 October 2010 | MF | (England) Craig Clay | (England) Barrow | 25 November 2010 | |
| 28 October 2010 | FW | (England) Tendayi Darikwa | (England) Barrow | 25 November 2010 | |
| 1 January 2011 | DF | (England) Dan Gray | (England) Macclesfield Town | End of season | |
Players released
| Date | Pos. | Name | Subsequent club | Join date | Ref. |
| 26 May 2010 | DF | (England) Danny Hall | (England) Crawley Town | 1 July 2010 | |
| 27 May 2010 | MF | (England) Adam Rundle | (England) Morecambe | 1 July 2010 | |
| 1 July 2010 | FW | (Republic of Ireland) Barry Conlon | (England) Stockport County | 15 July 2010 | |
| 1 July 2010 | FW | (England) Wade Small | (England) Aldershot Town | 30 July 2010 | |
| 1 July 2010 | MF | (England) Lloyd Kerry | (England) Hinckley United | 2 August 2010 | |
| 1 July 2010 | DF | (England) Phil Picken | (England) Bury | 3 August 2010 | |
| 1 July 2010 | DF | (England) Alan Goodall | (England) Rochdale | 3 August 2010 | |
| 1 July 2010 | DF | (Trinidad and Tobago) Kevin Austin | (England) Darlington | 3 August 2010 | |
| 1 July 2010 | MF | (England) Paul Harsley | (England) North Ferriby United | 7 August 2010 | |
| 1 July 2010 | MF | (England) Danny Boshell | (England) Guiseley | 27 August 2010 | |
| 1 July 2010 | MF | (England) Terrell Lewis | (England) Chalfont St Peter | ? | |
| 1 July 2010 | GK | (England) Matt Malak | (England) Retford United | ? | |
| 1 July 2010 | MF | (England) Simon Whaley | (England) Doncaster Rovers | 16 November 2010 | |
| 30 December 2010 | DF | (England) Chris Tingay | Unattached | | |
| 30 December 2010 | MF | (England) Jimmy Adcock | Unattached | | |
| 30 December 2010 | DF | (England) Ryan Granger | Unattached | | |
| 18 January 2011 | FW | (Scotland) Martin Gritton | (England) Chester | 22 February 2011 | |
