= Craig Clay =

English footballer (born 1992)

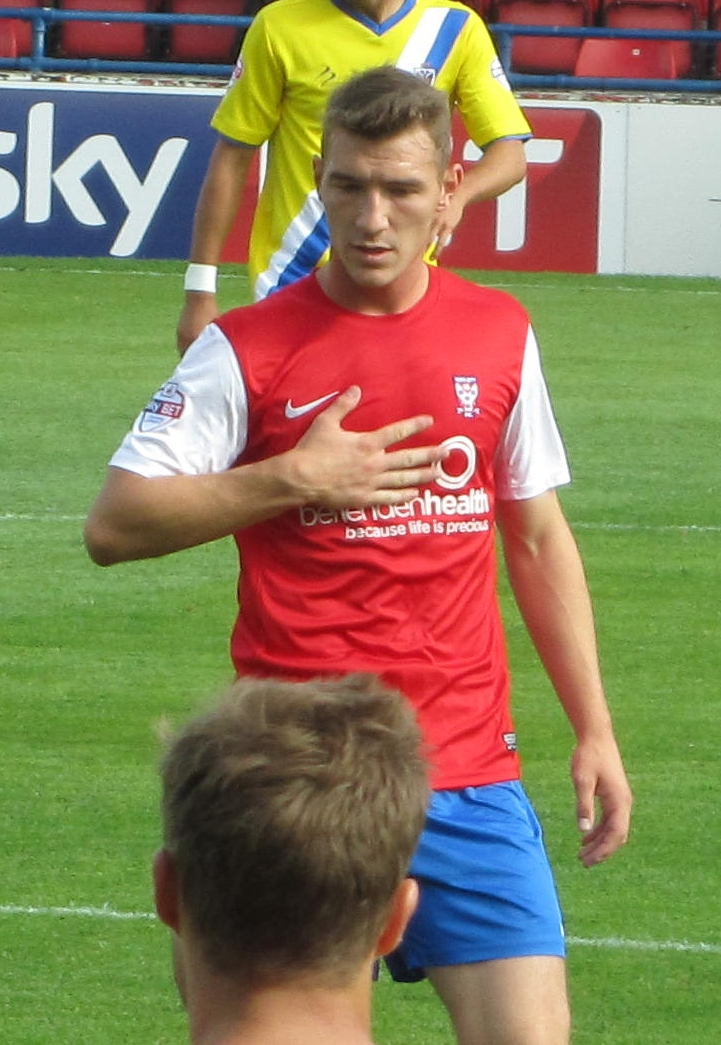
- Clay playing for York City in 2013

Personal information
- Full name: Craig William Clay
- Date of birth: 5 May 1992 (age 34)
- Place of birth: Nottingham, England
- Height: 5 ft 11 in (1.80 m)
- Position: Central midfielder

Youth career
- 2008–2010: Chesterfield

Senior career*
Years	Team	Apps	(Gls)
2010–2013	Chesterfield	27	(1)
2010	→ Barrow (loan)	1	(0)
2012	→ Alfreton Town (loan)	4	(1)
2013–2014	York City	8	(0)
2014	FC Halifax Town	4	(0)
2014	Worksop Town	9	(0)
2014–2016	Grimsby Town	74	(5)
2016–2017	Motherwell	35	(1)
2017–2023	Leyton Orient	210	(6)
2023–2024	Sutton United	27	(1)
2024–2025	Dunfermline Athletic	18	(0)
2025–2026	Kelty Hearts	30	(0)

International career
2016	England C	1	(0)
- * Club domestic league appearances and goals as of 10 September 2026

Craig William Clay (born 5 May 1992) is a former English professional footballer who played as a centre-back or midfielder.

He had spells as a professional for Chesterfield, York City, Grimsby Town and Motherwell before a four-year spell with Leyton Orient where he won several promotions and was voted the player of the year in 2019. He has also played semi-professionally for Barrow, Alfreton Town, FC Halifax Town and Worksop Town. In 2016 he was capped once by England C.

== Club career ==
=== Chesterfield ===
Clay was born in Nottingham, Nottinghamshire. He started his career with Chesterfield's youth system in 2008 and was part of the team that won the Youth League. He was named Chesterfield's Young Player of the Year for the 2008–09 season. His first involvement with the first team came as an unused substitute in a League Two match against Torquay United on 16 January 2010. He made the bench on a number occasions through the rest of 2009–10, but did not make an appearance.

He signed a two-year professional contract with Chesterfield in June 2010. He made his debut for the club on 18 September 2010, in a 3–0 home win over Cheltenham Town, replacing Mark Allott in the 85th minute. On 2 October 2010, he scored his first professional goal with a 25-yard shot during stoppage time to earn a 5–5 draw at home to Crewe Alexandra. On 28 October 2010, Clay joined Conference Premier club Barrow on a one-month loan with Chesterfield teammate Tendayi Darikwa. His only appearance for Barrow came two days later, in a 5–0 defeat away to Rushden & Diamonds. He made four appearances and scored one goal for Chesterfield in 2010–11, in which the club was promoted to League One as League Two champions.

Clay was loaned out by Chesterfield for a second time on 20 January 2012, joining Conference Premier club Alfreton Town on a one-month loan. Four days later, he scored Alfreton's third goal in a 3–0 win away to Bath City on his debut with a shot from the edge of the penalty area in the 90th minute. Clay finished the loan with one goal in four appearances. He made one more appearance for Chesterfield before the end of 2011–12, which he finished with eight appearances as the club was relegated to League Two in 22nd place.

He signed a new one-year contract with Chesterfield in May 2012. His only goal of 2012–13 came in a 6–1 win over League One team Hartlepool United in the FA Cup first round on 3 November 2012. Clay had a double hernia operation in March 2013 and after returning made one more appearance before the end of the season, as an 89th-minute substitute in a 2–0 victory away to Barnet on 6 April. He was released by Chesterfield on 29 April 2013 after making 23 appearances and scoring one goal in 2012–13.

=== York City ===
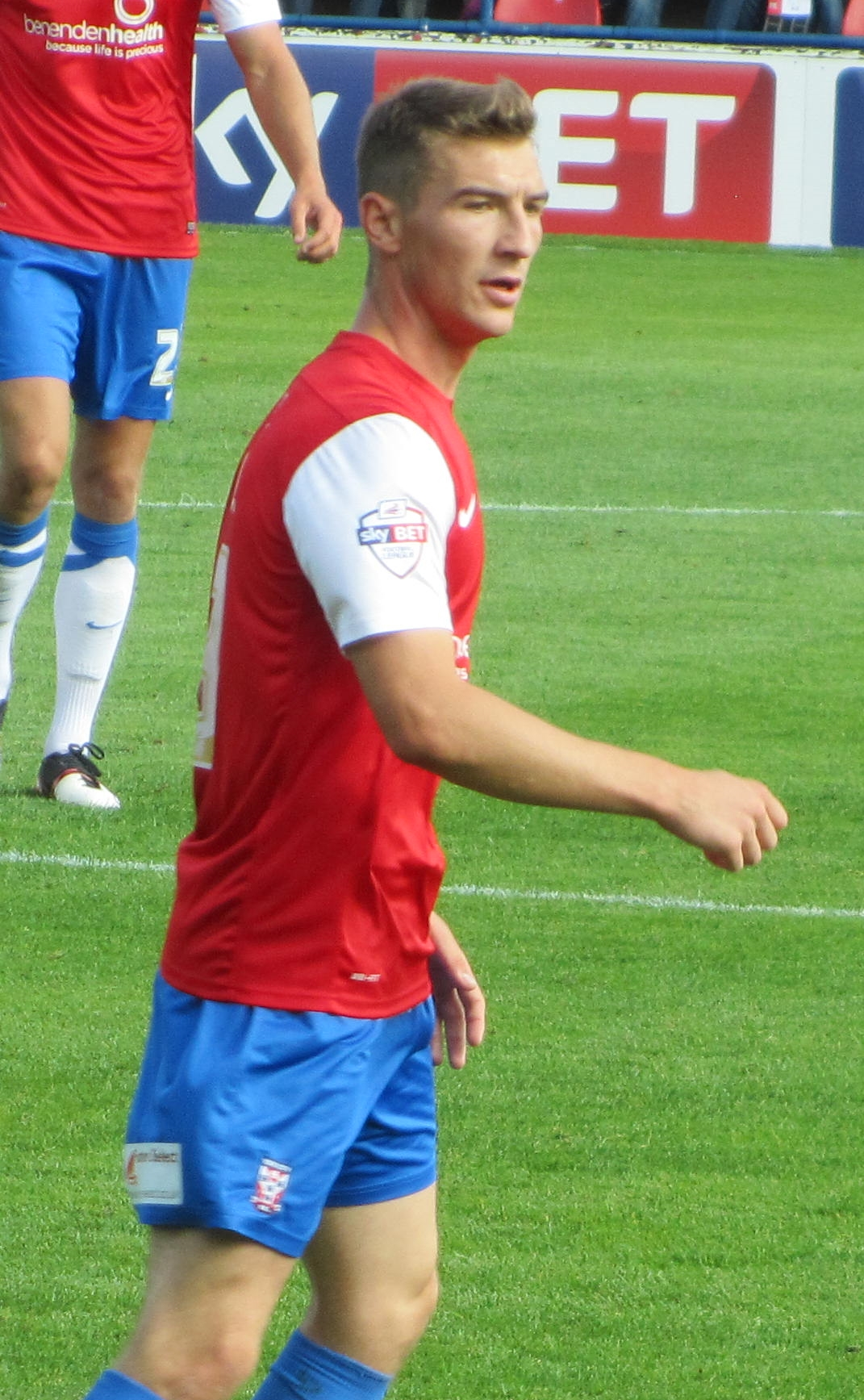
Clay playing for York City in 2013

Clay signed for League Two club York City on 17 May 2013 on a two-year contract. He made his debut in a 1–0 home win over Northampton Town on 3 August 2013, in the first match of 2013–14. Having made 10 appearances for York, Clay left the club by mutual consent on 13 January 2014, along with Jamal Fyfield.

=== FC Halifax Town and Worksop Town ===
He signed for Conference Premier club FC Halifax Town on 16 January 2014 on a one-month contract and made his debut two days later in a 1–1 home draw with Cambridge United. After making four appearances for the club he was released on 24 February 2014. Nearly a month later, Clay signed for Northern Premier League Premier Division club Worksop Town on 21 March 2014. He made his debut the following day as an 84th-minute substitute for Shane Clarke in a 2–0 away win over Stafford Rangers.

=== Grimsby Town ===
Clay signed for Conference Premier club Grimsby Town on 28 July 2014 on a one-year contract, having spent the pre-season on trial. On 15 May 2016, he started for Grimsby as they beat Forest Green Rovers 3–1 at Wembley Stadium in the 2016 National League play-off final. This meant Grimsby were promoted to League Two, after a six-year absence from the Football League. Clay was released when his contract expired at the end of the 2015–16 season.

=== Motherwell ===
Upon his release from Grimsby, Clay joined South African Premier Division club Bidvest Wits on trial. Clay then joined Scottish Premiership club Motherwell on trial, playing the full 90 minutes in a 3–0 victory over East Stirlingshire in the Scottish League Cup on 26 July 2016. Clay made his league debut on 6 August 2016 in a 2–1 victory away to Kilmarnock, before signing a two-year contract with the club on 10 August. He scored his first goal for the club on 28 December 2016, in a 2–1 win away to Inverness Caledonian Thistle.

=== Leyton Orient ===
Clay signed for newly relegated National League club Leyton Orient on 17 July 2017 on a two-year contract. He went on to win both the National League and EFL League Two titles with the club over the 6 years he was with them. His contract was not renewed at the end of the 2022/23 season.

=== Sutton United ===
On 30 June 2023, Clay signed for EFL League Two side Sutton United.

=== Dunfermline Athletic ===
Clay signed for Dunfermline Athletic of the Scottish second tier in September 2024.

=== Kelty Hearts ===
Clay agreed a deal to join Kelty Hearts in June 2025.

Clay announced his retirement on 10 September 2026 after his release from Kelty Hearts.

== International career ==
Clay made his debut for the England C national team as a substitute in their 2–0 away win over Ukraine under-20s in the International Challenge Trophy on 22 March 2016.

== Career statistics ==
As of match played 2 April 2021

Appearances and goals by club, season and competition
Club	Season	League			National Cup (Note: Includes FA Cup, Scottish Cup)		League Cup (Note: Includes League Cup, Scottish League Cup)		Other		Total	
Club	Season	Division	Apps	Goals	Apps	Goals	Apps	Goals	Apps	Goals	Apps	Goals
Chesterfield	2009–10	League Two	0	0	0	0	0	0	0	0	0	0
Chesterfield	2010–11	League Two	3	1	0	0	0	0	1 (Note: Appearance(s) in Football League Trophy)	0	4	1
Chesterfield	2011–12	League One	5	0	1	0	1	0	1	0	8	0
Chesterfield	2012–13	League Two	19	0	2	1	0	0	2	0	23	1
Chesterfield	Total		27	1	3	1	1	0	4	0	35	2
Barrow (loan)	2010–11	Conference Premier	1	0	—		—		—		1	0
Alfreton Town (loan)	2011–12	Conference Premier	4	1	—		—		0	0	4	1
York City	2013–14	League Two	8	0	1	0	1	0	0	0	10	0
FC Halifax Town	2013–14	Conference Premier	4	0	—		—		—		4	0
Worksop Town	2013–14	NPL Premier Division	9	0	—		—		—		9	0
Grimsby Town	2014–15	Conference Premier	39	2	2	0	—		6 (Note: Three appearances in FA Trophy, three in Conference Premier play-offs)	0	47	2
Grimsby Town	2015–16	National League	35	3	4	0	—		5 (Note: Three appearances in FA Trophy, two in National League play-offs)	0	44	3
Grimsby Town	Total		74	5	6	0	—		11	0	91	5
Motherwell	2016–17	Scottish Premiership	35	1	1	0	3	0	—		39	1
Motherwell	2017–18	Scottish Premiership	—		—		0	0	—		0	0
Motherwell	Total		35	1	1	0	3	0	0	0	39	1
Leyton Orient	2017–18	National League	43	4	2	0	—		4 (Note: Appearances in FA Trophy)	0	49	4
Leyton Orient	2018–19	National League	43	0	0	0	—		5	1	48	1
Leyton Orient	2019–20	League Two	35	0	1	0	1	0	2	0	39	0
Leyton Orient	2020–21	League Two	31	1	1	0	1	0	3	0	36	1
Leyton Orient	Total		152	5	4	0	2	0	14	1	172	6
Career total			314	13	15	1	7	0	29	1	365	15

== Honours ==
Grimsby Town

- National League play-offs: 2016
- FA Trophy runner-up: 2015–16

Leyton Orient

- EFL League Two: 2022–23
- National League: 2018–19
- FA Trophy runner-up: 2018–19

Individual

- Chesterfield Young Player of the Year: 2008–09
- Grimsby Town Young Player of the Year: 2014–15
