= Tendayi Darikwa =

Footballer (born 1991)

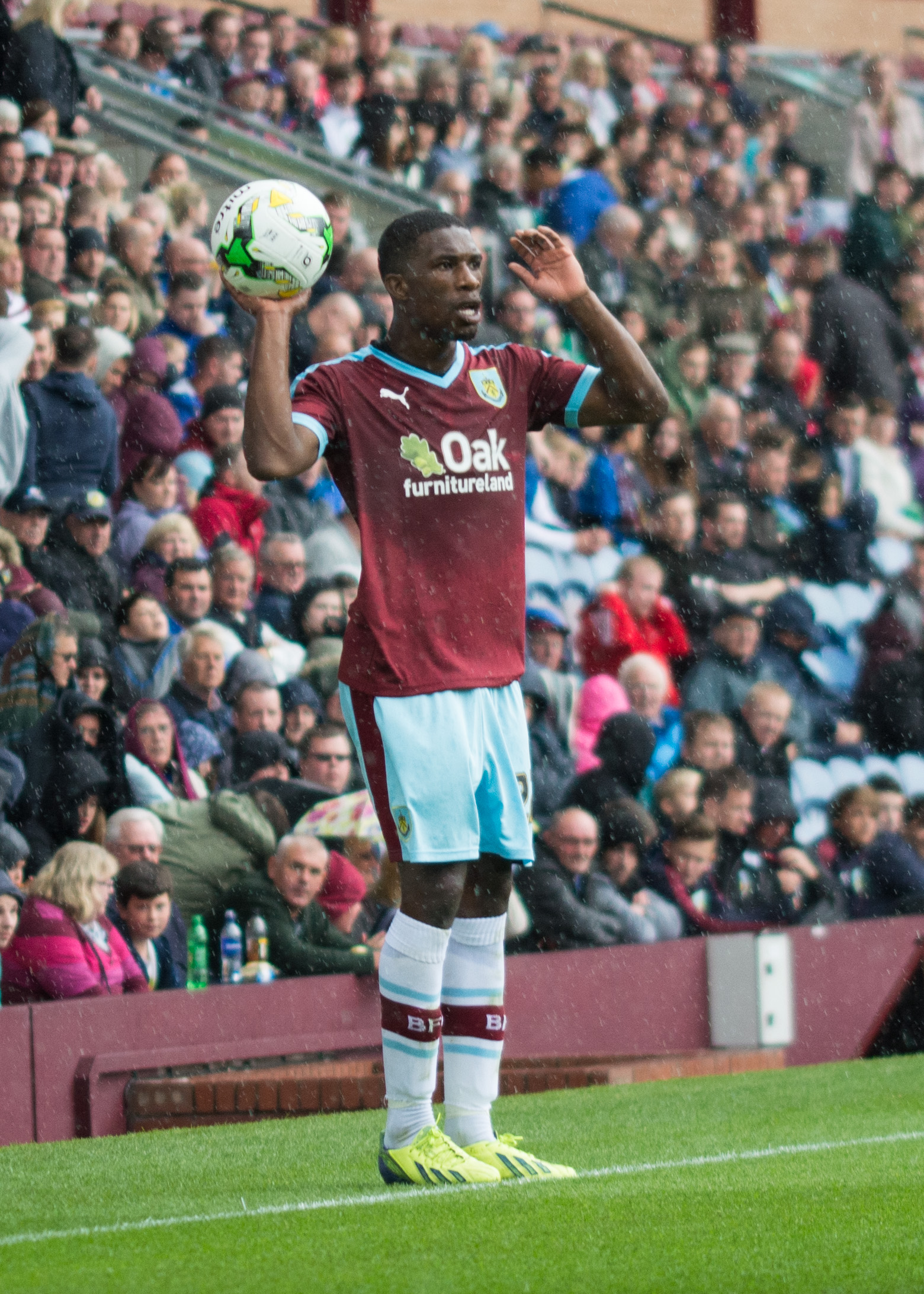
- Darikwa playing for Burnley in 2015

Personal information
- Full name: Tendayi David Darikwa
- Date of birth: 13 December 1991 (age 34)
- Place of birth: Nottingham, England
- Height: 5 ft 8 in (1.73 m)
- Position: Right back

Team information
- Current team: Lincoln City
- Number: 2

Youth career
- –2010: Chesterfield

Senior career*
Years	Team	Apps	(Gls)
2010–2015	Chesterfield	125	(9)
2010	→ Barrow (loan)	1	(0)
2012	→ Hinckley United (loan)	5	(0)
2015–2017	Burnley	21	(1)
2017–2021	Nottingham Forest	58	(0)
2021–2023	Wigan Athletic	106	(2)
2023–2024	Apollon Limassol	32	(1)
2024–	Lincoln City	91	(11)

International career^{‡}
2017–2021	Zimbabwe	14	(0)
- * Club domestic league appearances and goals as of 18:16, 22 August 2026 (UTC) ‡ National team caps and goals as of 15:31, 9 February 2025 (UTC)

Tendayi David Darikwa (born 13 December 1991) is a professional footballer who plays as a right back for EFL Championship club Lincoln City. Born in England, he plays international football for Zimbabwe.

== Early life ==
Born to Zimbabwean father and a mother of British and Caribbean heritage in Nottingham, Darikwa was raised in neighbouring West Bridgford and attended Abbey Road Primary School.

== Club career ==
=== Chesterfield ===
Darikwa started his career at Chesterfield, signing his first professional contract in the summer of 2010, before joining Barrow on loan with fellow Chesterfield player Craig Clay in October 2010.

He made his debut for Chesterfield on 27 November 2010, replacing Deane Smalley in the 55th minute of Chesterfield's 3–1 FA Cup defeat at Burton Albion.

Darikwa made his league debut for Chesterfield in the 2011–12 season when he started away to hometown club Notts County. He was offered a new one-year contract by the club in May 2012.

Due to good league performances early in 2012–13 season, after the appointment of new manager Paul Cook in late October 2012, Darikwa signed a one-year contract extension until 2015. He then received national recognition by winning the Football League Young Player of the Month for December 2012 In October 2013, Darikwa was linked with a move to Premier League club Manchester United, with manager David Moyes scouting the player. Darikwa said he was "flattered" by the interest, but felt he was "not ready" to play at that level.

On 30 March 2014, he played at Wembley Stadium in Chesterfield's 3–1 defeat to Peterborough United in the final of the Football League Trophy. He also played a vital role in helping the club get promoted when they won the League Two title at the end of the 2013–14 season.

After being converted from a right winger to a right back during the 2013–14 season, for the 2014–15 season Darikwa's squad number was changed from 7 to 2 to reflect his positional change. On 7 April 2015, he scored his first goal of the 2014–15 season with a headed goal in a victory against Crewe Alexandra. After another impressive season in his converted right back position, Darikwa helped Chesterfield reach the League One play-offs in 2014–15; however, they were beaten over two legs in the semi-final against Preston North End.

On 6 May 2015, Darikwa won four awards at the Chesterfield end of season awards, where he won the Player of the Year Award and Players' Player of the Season Award.

=== Burnley ===
Darikwa signed a three-year contract with Championship club Burnley on 30 July 2015. On 8 August 2015, the opening day of the 2015–16 season, he made his debut for Burnley against Leeds United in a 1–1 draw, getting the assist for Sam Vokes' equaliser. On 26 September, he scored his first goal for Burnley in a 2–1 loss to Reading.

=== Nottingham Forest ===
Darikwa signed a four-year contract with Nottingham Forest on 26 July 2017. He made his league debut for the club on 4 August 2017 in a 1–0 home win over Millwall. He scored his first goal for the club in an EFL Cup tie against Chelsea on 20 September 2017.

=== Wigan Athletic ===
On 11 January 2021, Darikwa joined League One side Wigan Athletic on a short-term contract until the end of the season, making his debut for the club on 16 January in a 3–3 draw with Rochdale. Darikwa signed a two-year contract with the club on 1 July 2021. He scored his first goal for Wigan in a 2–0 win at Charlton Athletic on 21 August 2021.

=== Apollon Limassol ===
On 27 June 2023, Darikwa was announced to have agreed a deal in principle to join Cypriot First Division club Apollon Limassol.

=== Lincoln City ===
On 5 July 2024, Darikwa joined Lincoln City on a one-year deal with the option of another year. He made his debut on 10 August in a 3–2 win against Burton Albion in which he scored Lincoln's second goal with a low header. On the 3 January 2025, Darikwa signed a new contract until the summer of 2026 with a club option for a further 12 months. He was voted the clubs Player of the Season after his first season at the club.

He was named as captain ahead of the 2025–26 season. In January 2026, the club exercised their one-year option, extending this contract until the summer of 2027. After winning promotion from League One in the 2025–26 season, he was named in the EFL League One Team of the Season alongside teammates, George Wickens, Sonny Bradley and Jack Moylan. He finished the season receiving an April player of the month nomination after scoring two more goals.

During the second game of the Championship season, Darikwa suffered a ruptured ACL injury against Portsmouth and was later ruled out for remainder of the season. Following successful surgery, he signed a new contract keeping him at the club until June 2028.

== International career ==
In October 2013, Darikwa revealed he was keen to play for the Zimbabwe national team, but reconsidered his position after being asked to pay a "processing fee" by a former Zimbabwe Football Association official. He did reveal he would consider any future approach from Zimbabwe or England. Darikwa made his debut for Zimbabwe on 8 November 2017 in a friendly defeat to Lesotho.

Darikwa represented the Zimbabwe national team at the 2019 Africa Cup of Nations, held in Egypt in June 2019. He started all three of Zimbabwe's group-stage matches as a right-back and played the full 90 minutes in each match. Zimbabwe lost their opening match 1–0 against Egypt on 21 June 2019 and drew 1–1 with Uganda on 26 June. They then suffered a 4–0 defeat against the DR Congo in their final group-stage match on 30 June, finishing bottom of the group with one draw and two defeats and being eliminated from the tournament. Darikwa featured in all three matches but did not score during the competition.

== Career statistics ==
=== Club ===
As of 22 August 2026

Appearances and goals by club, season and competition
Club	Season	League			Domestic Cup		League Cup		Other		Total	
Club	Season	Division	Apps	Goals	Apps	Goals	Apps	Goals	Apps	Goals	Apps	Goals
Chesterfield	2010–11	League Two	0	0	1	0	0	0	0	0	1	0
Chesterfield	2011–12	League One	2	0	0	0	0	0	1 (Note: Appearance(s) in Football League Trophy)	0	3	0
Chesterfield	2012–13	League Two	36	5	2	0	1	0	1	0	40	5
Chesterfield	2013–14	League Two	41	3	2	1	1	0	6	1	50	5
Chesterfield	2014–15	League One	46	1	6	0	1	0	3 (Note: One appearance in Football League Trophy, two in League One play-offs)	0	56	1
Chesterfield	Total		125	9	11	1	3	0	11	1	150	11
Barrow (loan)	2010–11	Conference Premier	1	0	—		—		—		1	0
Hinckley United (loan)	2011–12	Conference North	5	0	—		—		—		5	0
Burnley	2015–16	Championship	21	1	2	0	1	0	—		24	1
Burnley	2016–17	Premier League	0	0	4	0	1	0	—		5	0
Burnley	Total		21	1	6	0	2	0	—		29	1
Nottingham Forest	2017–18	Championship	30	0	0	0	2	1	—		32	1
Nottingham Forest	2018–19	Championship	28	0	1	0	2	0	—		31	0
Nottingham Forest	2019–20	Championship	0	0	0	0	0	0	—		0	0
Nottingham Forest	2020–21	Championship	0	0	0	0	0	0	—		0	0
Nottingham Forest	Total		58	0	1	0	4	1	—		63	1
Wigan Athletic	2020–21	League One	26	0	0	0	0	0	0	0	26	0
Wigan Athletic	2021–22	League One	43	2	5	0	1	0	2	0	51	2
Wigan Athletic	2022–23	Championship	37	0	2	0	0	0	0	0	39	0
Wigan Athletic	Total		106	2	7	0	1	0	2	0	116	2
Apollon Limassol	2023–24	Cypriot First Division	32	1	5	0	0	0	0	0	37	1
Lincoln City	2024–25	League One	44	5	3	0	0	0	3	0	50	5
Lincoln City	2025–26	League One	45	6	1	0	3	0	2	0	51	6
Lincoln City	2026–27	Championship	2	0	0	0	1	0	—		3	0
Lincoln City	Total		91	11	4	0	4	0	5	0	104	11
Career total			439	24	34	1	14	1	18	1	505	27

=== International ===
As of match played 9 October 2021

Appearances and goals by national team and year
National team	Year	Apps	Goals
Zimbabwe	2017	2	0
Zimbabwe	2018	2	0
Zimbabwe	2019	7	0
Zimbabwe	2020	2	0
Zimbabwe	2021	1	0
Total		14	0

== Honours ==
Chesterfield

- Football League Two: 2013–14
- Football League Trophy runner-up: 2013–14

Burnley

- Football League Championship: 2015–16

Wigan Athletic

- EFL League One: 2021–22

Lincoln City

- EFL League One: 2025–26

Zimbabwe

- COSAFA Cup bronze: 2019

Individual

- Football League Young Player of the Month: December 2012
- Chesterfield Player of the Year: 2014–15
- Chesterfield Players' Player of the Season: 2014–15
- EFL League One Team of the Season: 2025–26
- PFA Team of the Year: 2025–26 League One
