= Craig Davies (footballer) =

Footballer (born 1986)

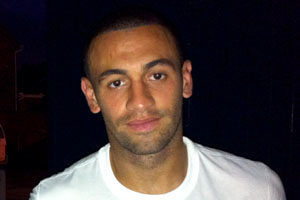
- Davies in 2010

Personal information
- Full name: Craig Martin Davies
- Date of birth: 9 January 1986 (age 40)
- Place of birth: Burton upon Trent, Staffordshire, England
- Height: 6 ft 2 in (1.88 m)
- Position: Striker

Youth career
- Shrewsbury Town
- Manchester City

Senior career*
Years	Team	Apps	(Gls)
2003–2004	Manchester City	0	(0)
2004–2006	Oxford United	48	(8)
2006–2007	Hellas Verona	1	(0)
2006–2007	→ Wolverhampton Wanderers (loan)	23	(0)
2007–2009	Oldham Athletic	44	(10)
2008	→ Stockport County (loan)	9	(5)
2009–2010	Brighton & Hove Albion	21	(1)
2009	→ Yeovil Town (loan)	4	(0)
2010	→ Port Vale (loan)	24	(7)
2010–2011	Chesterfield	41	(23)
2011–2013	Barnsley	60	(19)
2013–2015	Bolton Wanderers	53	(10)
2014	→ Preston North End (loan)	15	(5)
2015–2017	Wigan Athletic	40	(3)
2017	Scunthorpe United	19	(0)
2017–2018	Oldham Athletic	40	(11)
2018–2020	Mansfield Town	19	(2)
Total		461	(104)

International career
2002–2003	Wales U17	8	(2)
2003–2004	Wales U19	7	(0)
2004–2007	Wales U21	7	(3)
2005–2013	Wales	7	(0)
- * Club domestic league appearances and goals

Craig Martin Davies (born 9 January 1986) is a former professional footballer who played as a striker. In a 16-year professional career, he scored 117 goals in 516 league and cup games. Born in England, he was capped seven times for Wales in an eight-year international career.

Davies started his career at Manchester City, though he became a first-team regular at Oxford United between 2004 and 2006. He briefly spent time in Italy with Hellas Verona. He swiftly returned to England on loan with Wolverhampton Wanderers before signing with Oldham Athletic in 2007. Spending time on loan with Stockport County in 2008, he left Oldham the following year and signed with Brighton & Hove Albion. Enjoying loan spells with Yeovil Town and Port Vale, he transferred permanently to Chesterfield in 2010, who he helped to win the League Two title in his first season. He signed with Barnsley in July 2011 before being sold to Bolton Wanderers for £300,000 in January 2013. He joined Preston North End on loan 12 months after losing his place in the Bolton team. He signed with Wigan Athletic in July 2015 and helped the club to win promotion as champions of League One. He joined Scunthorpe United in January 2017 and rejoined Oldham Athletic five months later. He was sold to Mansfield Town in June 2018 and stayed with the club for two years.

== Club career ==
=== Early career ===
Davies was a member of the youth team at Shrewsbury Town and Manchester City. He was arrested at Maine Road after fighting with a fan who had attempted to steal a match ticket off him.

=== Manchester City ===
Davies moved on to League Two club Oxford United in August 2004. He made his league debut under the stewardship of Ramón Díaz on 30 August 2004 in a 1–0 win at Notts County. He was suspended two months later, along with two other youth team players, for being unwitting accomplices to a leud prank on a fellow youth team player by first-team striker Julian Alsop. He signed a contract extension in February 2005. Speaking in September 2005, manager Brian Talbot praised him for his "pace and aggression" after having previously been critical of the player for his perceived selfishness and choosing Lee Bradbury and Steve Basham ahead of him. He went on to score eight goals in 29 appearances for the first-team during the season and came close to signing for Premier League side Charlton Athletic in June 2005. He was out of favour under Talbot and the club looked to move him on. After leaving the Kassam Stadium, Davies spoke out against Talbot, saying the manager forced him to submit a transfer request and "he has achieved nothing [as a manager]".

=== Hellas Verona ===
Davies moved to Hellas Verona of Serie B in January 2006 for a fee of £85,000. He hoped the move would improve his international prospects. He signed a five-year contract as manager Massimo Ficcadenti showed a lot of faith in him, but managed only one appearance for the Italian club in a 3–2 defeat by Brescia.

"Family and friends are the main things I am missing, and my old daily routine. Some days I am fine and I will not think about it, but other times it plays on my mind. Earlier this week I really felt like I wanted to see my family, so I am still a bit homesick I suppose."

— Early signs of Davies's dissatisfaction in Italy

=== Wolverhampton Wanderers ===
In July 2006, Davies had a trial at Northampton Town. The next month he moved on loan to Championship side Wolverhampton Wanderers, claiming he wanted out of Italy as he was too young to adapt to the change in culture. He was a regular choice throughout the first half of the 2006–07 season after impressing manager Mick McCarthy in substitute appearances on the wing and then as a lone striker. Still, he found himself largely unused after the January transfer window saw Wolves sign striker Andy Keogh. He never managed a league goal for the club in 23 games, but did score twice in the FA Cup, ironically against the club he would join permanently, Oldham Athletic, once in the original tie and again in the replay.

=== Oldham Athletic ===
After Wolves opted not to make his loan a permanent move, Davies signed for League One side Oldham Athletic in June 2007 for an undisclosed fee. He signed a two-year contract. He marked his debut against Swansea City by scoring a last-minute winner and immediately became a first-choice player. Manager John Sheridan had faith in the young striker, though said, "I keep getting on at Craig and maybe he doesn't like it but I will carry on". In August 2008, he signed a contract extension to keep him at Oldham until summer 2010. Later that month he received the first red card of his career for headbutting an opposing player in a League Cup game. He said "the sending-off has taught me a lesson" as he reflected on his career during his suspension. Three months later, Davies was loaned to Oldham's League One rivals Stockport County to regain form after a poor start to the season, failing to score in ten appearances. He settled in well at Edgeley Park and manager Jim Gannon was keen to sign him permanently. He made 13 appearances for Stockport, scoring six goals, including a hat-trick over Bristol Rovers. County showed interest in signing him permanently.

=== Brighton & Hove Albion ===
In January 2009, Davies agreed a transfer to League One side Brighton & Hove Albion for an undisclosed fee believed to be £150,000; the transfer was completed on 2 February. On 10 February, Davies made his debut and scored his first goal for the club in a 4–2 loss to Peterborough United, scoring in the 27th-minute for the first goal of the game. New manager Russell Slade steered the club away from relegation despite injuries to the front two of Nicky Forster and Glenn Murray; Davies failed to add to his goal tally in ten starts and six substitute appearances, though late loan arrival Lloyd Owusu managed to find the form to help fire Brighton to safety.

On 25 September 2009, Davies joined League One rivals Yeovil Town on loan, initially for one-month. He made his debut for Yeovil on 26 September in a 2–0 win over Brentford at Huish Park. He played four games for Terry Skiverton's side.

On 15 January 2010, Davies joined League Two side Port Vale on an initial one-month loan deal, rejoining Micky Adams, the manager who had signed him for Brighton. He hoped this loan move could reignite his career at the Withdean Stadium, and end his eleven-month goal drought. He quickly earned the praise of teammate Marc Richards, who said: "Craig is big, tall and strong, which is everything a good striker would want, and he can score goals as well". Assistant manager Geoff Horsfield said Davies' signing was "fantastic for the club". Micky Adams said that "He's a big, strong boy who is also quick. He is different to what we've got and he'll certainly cause defences some problems."

He made a highly impressive start during his first two appearances, and ended his year-long goal drought in his fourth. His loan deal was then quickly extended until the end of the season. He finished the campaign with seven goals in 24 games for the Vale.

=== Chesterfield ===
On 6 July 2010, Davies had his Brighton contract cancelled by mutual consent following an agreement with manager Gus Poyet. Later that same day, Davies signed a one-year contract with League Two side Chesterfield. He made history when in a 5–4 pre-season friendly defeat to Derby County he became the first player to score at Chesterfield's new B2net Stadium. A similar, more dubious honour came on 7 August 2010, when in a 2–1 win over Barnet he became the first player to be sent off at the stadium – also his competitive debut for the club. His eleven goals in his opening 13 league games helped to propel his side to the top of the league, and he was made the division's Player of the Month for October after scoring five goals in six games. He again won the same honour for March, tallying up six goals in six games. Chesterfield ended the season as league champions, thereby winning promotion to League One. Davies finished with 23 league goals to his name, putting him joint fourth (with Adam Le Fondre) in the division's scoring charts - five goals above striker partner Jack Lester, but five goals behind Crewe Alexandra's Clayton Donaldson. He was also named in the PFA Team of the Year, along with teammates Danny Whitaker and Tommy Lee.

=== Barnsley ===
Davies' highly successful season with Chesterfield earned him attention from numerous Championship clubs, including Reading. However, it was Barnsley manager Keith Hill who was able to tempt the young striker, who signed a contract with the club in July 2011. It took until his ninth appearance for Davies find his first goal for the club, when he struck from 12 yards (11 m) out in a 2–1 defeat to Bristol City at Oakwell. This was the first of a streak of eight goals in eight games, during which he scored twice against Doncaster Rovers and Ipswich Town. He finished the 2011–12 campaign with 11 goals in 42 appearances.

On 22 September, Davies scored four goals in the space of 19 second-half minutes in a 5–0 demolition of Birmingham City at St Andrew's, earning himself a place on the Championship Team of the Week. On 17 November, he marked his return from almost a month out with a hamstring problem with the equalizing goal in a 1–1 draw with Bolton Wanderers at The Reebok. He totalled nine goals for the "Tykes" in 22 appearances in the first half of the 2012–13 campaign.

=== Bolton Wanderers ===
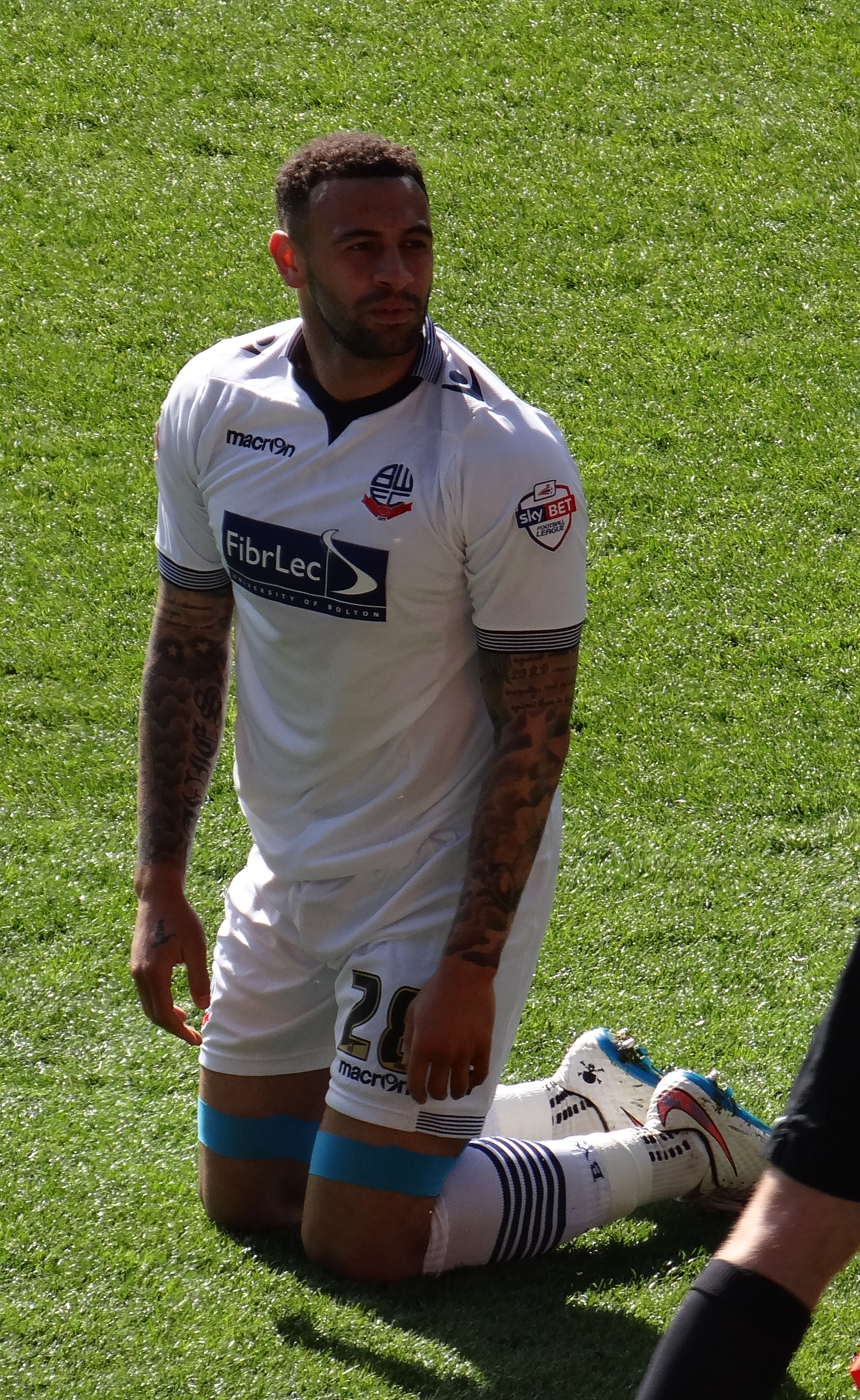
Davies playing for Bolton Wanderers in 2015

In January 2013, Championship rivals Bolton Wanderers made a successful £300,000 transfer bid for Davies, and began negotiating personal terms. He agreed to a two-and-a-half-year deal, and became Dougie Freedman's first permanent signing as the "Trotters" manager. He made his debut for Bolton on 19 January, as a late substitute for Darren Pratley in a goalless draw with Crystal Palace at Selhurst Park. He scored his first goal for Bolton on 9 February in a 2–1 win over Burnley at the Reebok Stadium, and followed this up with the equalising goal for Bolton in a 1–1 draw with Nottingham Forest at the City Ground just a week later. He was sent off after receiving two yellow cards in a 3–2 defeat to Charlton Athletic at The Valley on 30 March.

He played ten games without scoring a goal as he struggled with injuries during the first half of the 2013–14 season. He was reported to be joining Wolves on loan in November, with manager Kenny Jackett having previously bid £400,000 for the striker in the summer. On 31 January 2014, Davies joined Preston North End on loan for the rest of the season, where he scored five goals in 15 appearances. He marked his debut at Deepdale the following day with the opening goal of a 2–0 win over Notts County. On 12 April, he scored a hat-trick for the Lilywhites in a 6–1 home win over Carlisle United. Manager Simon Grayson praised him for his form and described Davies as the complete package. The Lilywhites went on to secure a play-off place at the end of the 2013–14 season, losing to Rotherham United at the semi-final stage.

He won the club's Player of the Month award for August 2014. However, in the 2014–15 season, Davies struggled with hamstring problems, as did a number of his teammates. On 6 April, he scored a second-half brace in an away game against Cardiff City, but yet again he pulled up in training later that week with another hamstring injury. He was released by manager Neil Lennon in May 2015.

=== Wigan Athletic ===
In July 2015, Davies signed a two-year contract with newly relegated League One side Wigan Athletic after securing his release from Bolton; "Latics" manager Gary Caldwell said that he was "a powerful striker who has a proven track record in this division". He scored two goals in 30 appearances across the 2015–16 campaign as Wigan won promotion as champions of League One. However, he struggled for game time under new manager Warren Joyce as Wigan struggled in the Championship in the 2016–17 season.

=== Scunthorpe United ===
On 7 January 2017, Davies joined League One club Scunthorpe United on a contract until the end of the 2016–17 season, with Graham Alexander's side third in the table. He failed to score in 21 appearances in the second half of the campaign, though was predominantly a substitute and only made three league starts.

=== Return to Oldham ===
In June 2017, Davies rejoined Oldham Athletic – again in League One – on a two-year deal as manager John Sheridan's second summer signing. He said the chance to be reunited with Sheridan was a major factor in his decision to join the club. He was linked with a move to Coventry City in the January transfer window, but new manager Richie Wellens stated that it would be "suicidal" of the club to accept any offer. Davies ended the 2017–18 campaign with 14 goals in 44 appearances, but could not prevent Oldham being relegated into League Two. After leaving Oldham, he slammed chairman Abdallah Lemsagam for his treatment of staff.

=== Mansfield Town ===
On 29 June 2018, Davies signed a two-year contract with League Two club Mansfield Town after the "Stags" paid Oldham an undisclosed fee. He said that manager David Flitcroft could get the best out fo him, having previously coached him at Barnsley. However, he was reported to have been playing at "about 60 per cent of capacity" in the first half of the 2018–19 season due to bits of flaked-off bone getting trapped in his ankle joints and causing him constant pain; he underwent surgery in December and was ruled out of action for the rest of the season. He managed to make only five appearances during the 2019–20 season, but was getting back to match fitness when the season was ended in March due to the COVID-19 pandemic in England. He was released by manager Graham Coughlan at the end of the campaign.

== International career ==
Davies holds a record for the Wales under-21 team by being one of only four people to have scored a hat trick at that level alongside John Hartson, Lee Jones and Ched Evans. This feat saw him earn a call-up to the senior squad. However, he was sent off in August 2006 in a 3–2 defeat by Israel under-21s, and received a five-match international ban.

He was capped seven times by Wales, qualifying through a grandparent, having made his international debut as a substitute in a goalless draw with Slovenia on 17 August 2005. Two months later, he withdrew from the international squad for personal reasons.

He was recalled to the squad in January 2008 for a friendly with Norway at Wrexham after serving 18 months out due to international suspension. A further re-call in August 2008 was denied by his club Oldham due to a disciplinary issue. He was called up to feature in qualification to the 2014 FIFA World Cup. He came on as a second-half substitute against Scotland on 12 October 2012.

== Personal life ==
In May 2007, he was handed a four-month suspended prison sentence for harassment and given a five-year restraining order banning him from contacting his former girlfriend. In February 2015, he was called a 'Good Samaritan' after assisting an elderly couple who had broken down in a hire car.

== Career statistics ==
=== Club ===
Appearances and goals by club, season and competition
Season	Club	League			FA Cup		League Cup		Other		Total	
Season	Club	Division	Apps	Goals	Apps	Goals	Apps	Goals	Apps	Goals	Apps	Goals
Oxford United	2004–05	League Two	28	6	0	0	0	0	1 (Note: Appearance(s) in the Football League Trophy / EFL Trophy)	0	29	6
Oxford United	2005–06	League Two	20	2	3	0	1	0	2	0	26	2
Oxford United	Total		48	8	3	0	1	0	3	0	55	8
Hellas Verona	2006–07	Serie B	1	0	—		—		0	0	1	0
Wolverhampton Wanderers (loan)	2006–07	Championship	23	0	3	2	1	0	0	0	27	2
Oldham Athletic	2007–08	League One	32	10	5	1	2	1	2	1	41	13
Oldham Athletic	2008–09	League One	12	0	0	0	1	0	1	0	14	0
Oldham Athletic	Total		44	10	5	1	3	1	3	1	55	13
Stockport County (loan)	2008–09	League One	9	5	4	1	—		0	0	13	6
Brighton & Hove Albion	2008–09	League One	16	1	—		—		—		16	1
Brighton & Hove Albion	2009–10	League One	5	0	2	0	0	0	0	0	7	0
Brighton & Hove Albion	Total		21	1	2	0	0	0	0	0	23	1
Yeovil Town (loan)	2009–10	League One	4	0	0	0	—		—		4	0
Port Vale (loan)	2009–10	League Two	24	7	—		—		—		24	7
Chesterfield	2010–11	League Two	41	23	2	1	0	0	2	1	45	25
Barnsley	2011–12	Championship	40	11	1	0	1	0	—		42	11
Barnsley	2012–13	Championship	20	8	0	0	2	1	—		22	9
Barnsley	Total		60	19	1	0	3	1	0	0	64	20
Bolton Wanderers	2012–13	Championship	18	4	0	0	—		—		18	4
Bolton Wanderers	2013–14	Championship	8	0	1	0	1	0	—		10	0
Bolton Wanderers	2014–15	Championship	27	6	1	0	2	1	—		30	7
Bolton Wanderers	Total		53	10	2	0	3	1	0	0	58	11
Preston North End (loan)	2013–14	League One	15	5	0	0	—		0	0	15	5
Wigan Athletic	2015–16	League One	26	2	1	0	1	0	2	0	30	2
Wigan Athletic	2016–17	Championship	14	1	0	0	0	0	0	0	14	1
Wigan Athletic	Total		40	3	1	0	1	0	2	0	44	3
Scunthorpe United	2016–17	League One	19	0	—		—		2 (Note: 1 appearance in the EFL Trophy and 1 appearance in the League One play-offs)	0	21	0
Oldham Athletic	2017–18	League One	40	11	1	0	1	1	2	2	44	14
Mansfield Town	2018–19	League Two	14	2	1	0	1	0	2	0	18	2
Mansfield Town	2019–20	League Two	5	0	0	0	0	0	0	0	5	0
Mansfield Town	Total		19	2	1	0	1	0	2	0	23	2
Career total			461	104	25	5	14	4	16	4	516	117

=== International ===
Appearances and goals by national team and year
National team	Year	Apps	Goals
Wales	2005	2	0
Wales	2006	2	0
Wales	2008	1	0
Wales	2012	1	0
Wales	2013	1	0
Total		7	0

== Honours ==
Chesterfield

- Football League Two: 2010–11

Wigan Athletic

- Football League One: 2015–16

Individual

- Football League Two Player of the Month: October 2010, March 2011
- PFA Team of the Year: 2010–11 League Two
