= Tommy Lee (footballer) =

English footballer

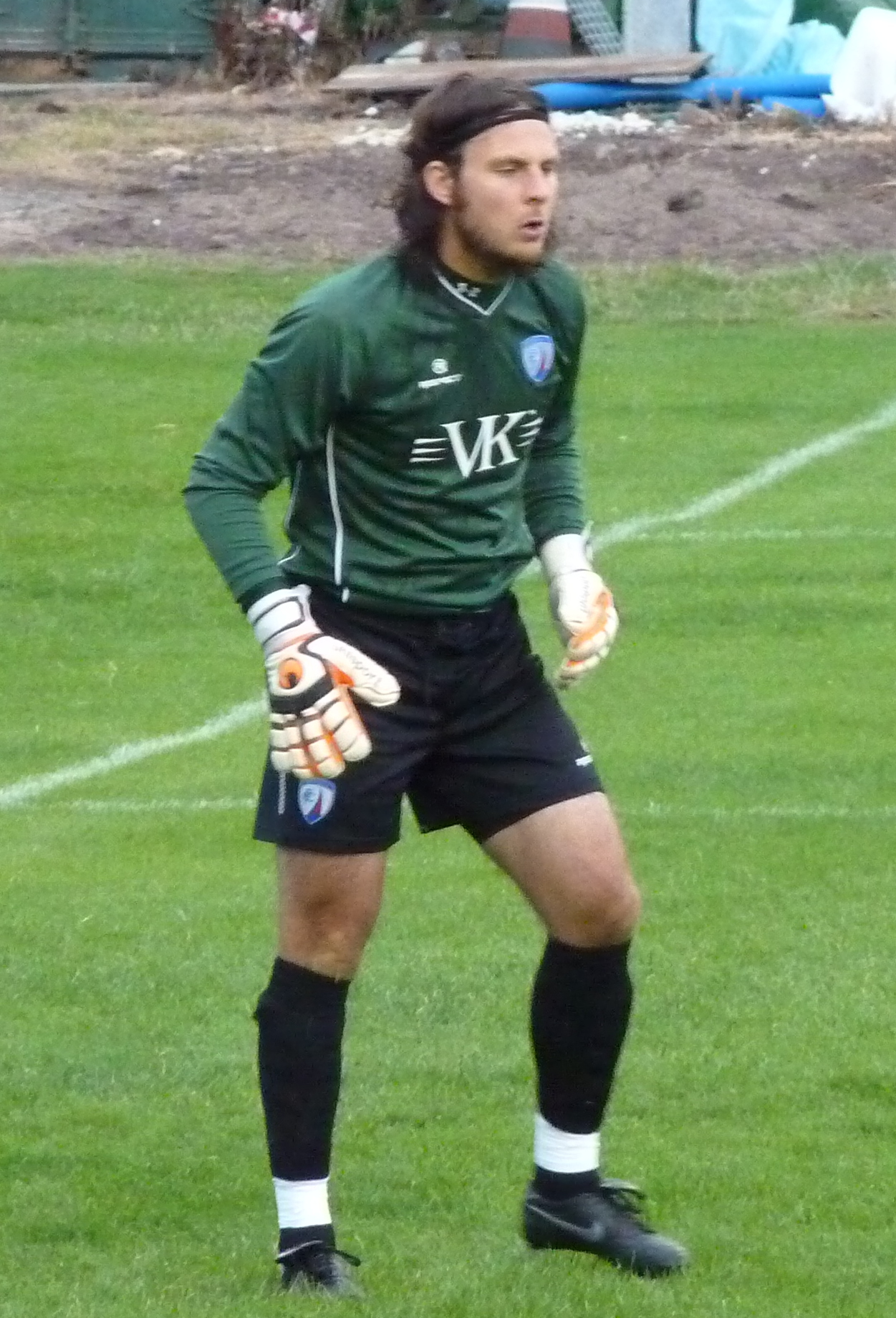
- Lee playing for Chesterfield in 2011

Personal information
- Full name: Thomas Edward Lee
- Date of birth: 3 January 1986 (age 40)
- Place of birth: Keighley, England
- Height: 6 ft 2 in (1.88 m)
- Position: Goalkeeper

Team information
- Current team: Manchester United (Academy Goalkeeping Coach)

Youth career
- 2002–2005: Manchester United

Senior career*
Years	Team	Apps	(Gls)
2005–2006	Manchester United	0	(0)
2006	→ Macclesfield Town (loan)	11	(0)
2006–2008	Macclesfield Town	52	(0)
2008	→ Rochdale (loan)	11	(0)
2008–2017	Chesterfield	328	(0)
Total		402	(0)
- * Club domestic league appearances and goals

Thomas Edward Lee (born 3 January 1986) is an English former professional footballer who played as a goalkeeper. He began his career with Manchester United, but was unable to break into the first team and was loaned to Macclesfield Town in 2006. He joined Macclesfield permanently later that year, spending two years there before first joining Rochdale on loan and then Chesterfield on a permanent basis. He played for Chesterfield for nine seasons, appearing in more than 350 matches before his retirement due to a shoulder injury in 2017.

== Career ==
=== Manchester United ===
Lee was born in Keighley, West Yorkshire. Playing for local team Oakworth Juniors, he then went to Manchester United as a junior player in 2002. In 2005, he helped United's reserve team win the quadruple. In the 2005–06 season he was loaned to Macclesfield Town for what was originally going to be a month, but was extended to three months.

=== Macclesfield Town ===
Lee made his league debut away at Oxford United. During his loan period, Macclesfield boss Brian Horton told the Macclesfield Express: "Tommy has been excellent since joining us in January. I spoke to Tony Coton, United's goalkeeping coach, and Sir Alex Ferguson. Both were happy to extend Tommy's loan spell."

In August 2006, he signed a contract with Macclesfield, arriving on a free transfer from Manchester United.

On 6 January 2007, Lee kept goal for Macclesfield Town against English champions Chelsea at Stamford Bridge. Despite suffering an injury to his arm while making a save from Salomon Kalou, he played on until he was sent off for a foul on Andriy Shevchenko. Macclesfield were already 2–1 down by this point, and conceded another four goals after going down to 10 men.

On 22 March 2008, Lee joined Rochdale on loan from Macclesfield Town and played in Rochdale's Play Off Final appearance at Wembley Stadium against Stockport County. Lee was released by Macclesfield in May 2008, before joining Chesterfield on 1 August on a one-year contract.

=== Chesterfield ===
In September 2008, Lee was attacked during a night out in Sheffield and required surgery after his jaw was broken. After returning to action, Lee became a fan favourite at Saltergate.

At the end of the season, Lee won the club's Young Spireites Player of the Season award, before signing a two-year deal to keep him at Chesterfield until June 2011. In May 2011, Lee was offered and signed a two-year extension, keeping him at the club until June 2013. Lee has been a firm favourite with the Chesterfield fans, his popularity easily notable as the goalkeeper picked up the fan-voted Player of the Year Award two years running.

Lee played every minute of the Spireites' championship-winning 2010–11 season. His fine form was rewarded as he was placed in the PFA Team of the Year for that season. In September 2011, Lee was injured in a game against Bury. The side missed him to the extent that without him they began a long series of matches without winning and slumped to the bottom of the League One table.

In January 2012, Lee was named man of the match in both legs of the Football League Trophy Northern Final, helping Chesterfield to a 3–1 win and their first trip to the new Wembley Stadium. In the final on 25 March 2012, Lee helped his team keep a clean sheet in a 2–0 win over the much fancied Swindon Town, making a crucial flying save to tip a header over the bar in the final minutes of the game.

In January 2013 Lee signed a three-year contract keeping him at Chesterfield until 2016.

Tommy Lee again found himself in the League 2 PFA Team of the Year, on the same day he kept a clean sheet against Burton Albion to take the Spireites back to League 1 on 27 April 2014.

On 22 July 2015, Lee signed a two-year contract extension, keeping him at the club until 2018. On 2 January 2016, Lee made his 300th league appearance for the Spireites in a 7–1 victory at home against Shrewsbury Town.

On 6 November 2017, Lee announced his retirement from football with immediate effect, aged 31, due to a recurring shoulder injury.

On 25 July 2018, Lee was honoured with a testimonial match against Wigan Athletic, managed by former Chesterfield manager Paul Cook. Lee started the match and played the opening six minutes before being substituted to a standing ovation. The match finished 1–1.

== Coaching career ==
On 24 August 2018, Lee joined the academy of Sheffield Wednesday as a goalkeeping coach. In August 2020, he moved across the city to join Sheffield United as their academy goalkeeping coach.

== Career statistics ==
Appearances and goals by club, season and competition
Club	Season	League			FA Cup		League Cup		Other		Total	
Club	Season	Division	Apps	Goals	Apps	Goals	Apps	Goals	Apps	Goals	Apps	Goals
Manchester United	2005–06	Premier League	0	0	0	0	0	0	0	0	0	0
Macclesfield Town (loan)	2005–06	League Two	11	0	—		—		1 (Note: Appearance(s) in Football League Trophy)	0	12	0
Macclesfield Town	2006–07	League Two	34	0	1	0	0	0	0	0	35	0
Macclesfield Town	2007–08	League Two	18	0	1	0	1	0	0	0	20	0
Macclesfield Town	Total		63	0	2	0	1	0	1	0	67	0
Rochdale (loan)	2007–08	League Two	11	0	—		—		3 (Note: Appearances in League Two play-offs)	0	14	0
Chesterfield	2008–09	League Two	28	0	2	0	1	0	1	0	32	0
Chesterfield	2009–10	League Two	42	0	1	0	1	0	3	0	47	0
Chesterfield	2010–11	League Two	46	0	2	0	1	0	2	0	51	0
Chesterfield	2011–12	League One	35	0	0	0	1	0	4	0	40	0
Chesterfield	2012–13	League Two	32	0	1	0	1	0	1	0	35	0
Chesterfield	2013–14	League Two	46	0	2	0	1	0	6	0	55	0
Chesterfield	2014–15	League One	46	0	6	0	1	0	2 (Note: One appearance in Football League Trophy, one in League One play-offs)	0	55	0
Chesterfield	2015–16	League One	46	0	3	0	1	0	1	0	51	0
Chesterfield	2016–17	League One	0	0	0	0	0	0	0	0	0	0
Chesterfield	2017–18	League Two	7	0	0	0	0	0	0	0	7	0
Chesterfield	Total		328	0	17	0	8	0	20	0	373	0
Career total			402	0	19	0	9	0	24	0	454	0

== Honours ==
Chesterfield

- Football League Two: 2010–11, 2013–14
- Football League Trophy: 2011–12; runner-up: 2013–14

Individual

- PFA Team of the Year: 2010–11 League Two, 2013–14 League Two
- PFA Fans' Player of the Year: 2013–14 League Two
