= Terrell Lewis (footballer) =

English footballer

Personal information
- Full name: Terrell Dayne Lewis
- Date of birth: 13 August 1988 (age 38)
- Place of birth: Brent, England
- Position: Midfielder

Team information
- Current team: Pagham

Youth career
- Chalfont St Peter

Senior career*
Years	Team	Apps	(Gls)
–2009	Chalfont St Peter	150	(96)
2009–2010	Chesterfield	1	(0)
2015	Pagham		
- * Club domestic league appearances and goals as of 09:01, 28 November 2010 (UTC)

Terrell Dayne Lewis (born 13 August 1988) is an English footballer who plays for Pagham. Lewis plays as a right midfielder or right winger.

== Career ==
=== Chalfont St Peter ===
Lewis is a product of Chalfont St Peter's youth and football development scheme making over 150 first team appearances for the club and scoring over 70 goals. He joined the club having impressed manager Danny Edwards.

=== Chesterfield ===
In October 2009 he was given a trial at Chesterfield, playing two reserve team friendlies against Sheffield and Nottingham Forest Reserves and signed on a one-year contract until the end of the 2009–10 season and made his league debut in a 5–2 home win against Darlington on 21 November 2009. He was released at the end of the season and returned to play for Chalfont St Peter.
