= Dean Morgan =

Montserrat international footballer

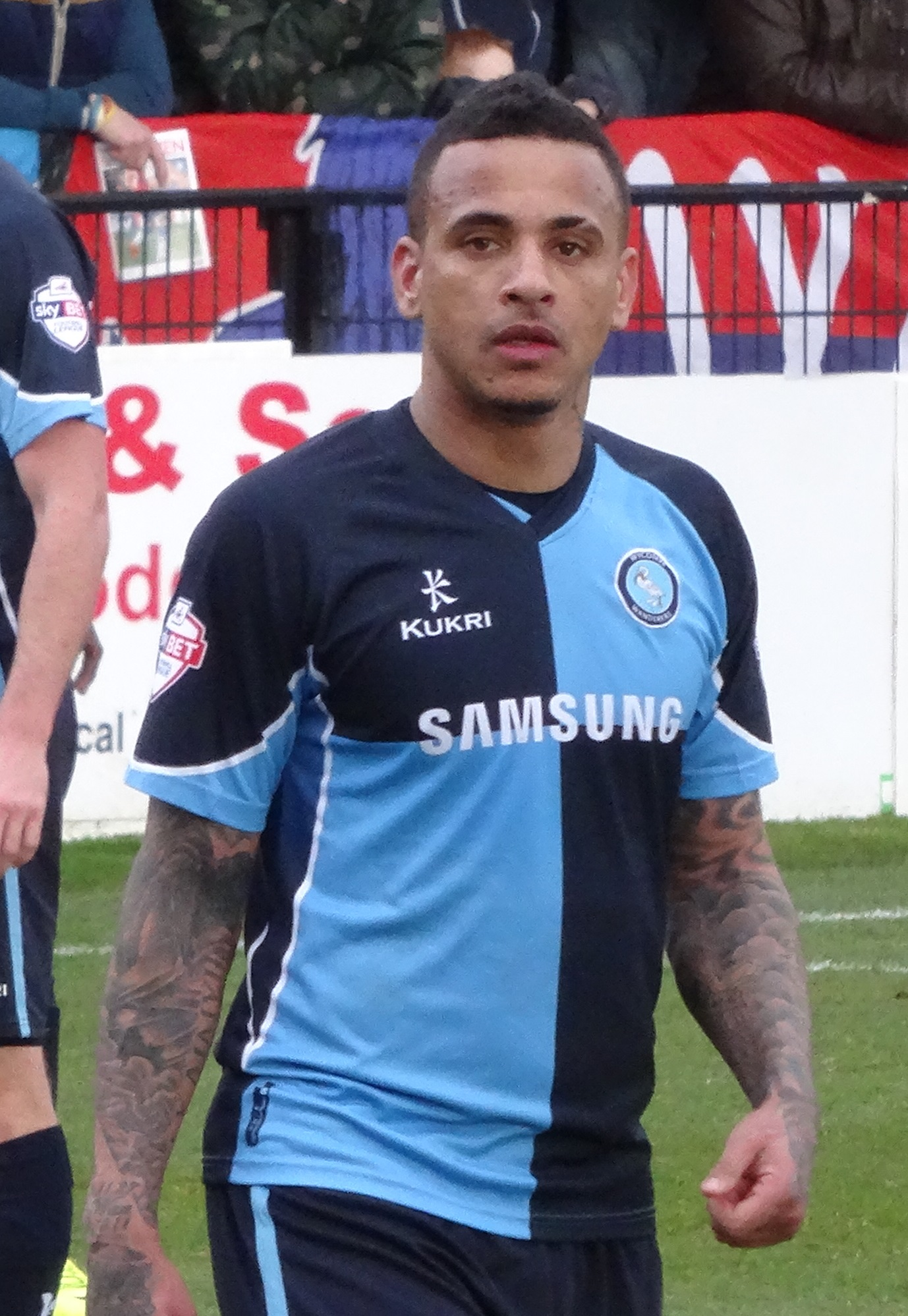
- Morgan playing for Wycombe Wanderers in 2014

Personal information
- Full name: Dean Lance Morgan
- Date of birth: 3 October 1983 (age 43)
- Place of birth: Edmonton, England
- Height: 1.80 m (5 ft 11 in)
- Positions: Striker; winger

Team information
- Current team: Uxbridge

Youth career
- ?–2000: Colchester United

Senior career*
Years	Team	Apps	(Gls)
2000–2003	Colchester United	71	(6)
2003–2005	Reading	31	(3)
2005–2009	Luton Town	88	(11)
2007–2008	→ Southend United (loan)	8	(0)
2008	→ Crewe Alexandra (loan)	9	(1)
2008–2009	→ Leyton Orient (loan)	32	(5)
2009	Grays Athletic	2	(1)
2009–2010	Milton Keynes Dons	9	(1)
2010	→ Aldershot Town (loan)	11	(4)
2010–2012	Chesterfield	38	(4)
2012	→ Oxford United (loan)	10	(1)
2012–2014	Wycombe Wanderers	57	(15)
2014–2015	Woking	25	(9)
2015	→ Crawley Town (loan)	13	(0)
2015–2016	U.S. Ancona 1905	1	(0)
2016	Newport County	9	(1)
2016	Throttur FC	5	(0)
2016	Welling United	6	(3)
2016–2017	Bishop's Stortford	5	(1)
2017–2018	Margate	14	(0)
2018	Beaconsfield Town	5	(0)
2022–2023	St. Panteleimon		
2023–	Uxbridge	0	(0)

International career^{‡}
2014–2015	Montserrat	3	(0)
- * Club domestic league appearances and goals as of 16:31, 17 July 2023 (UTC) ‡ National team caps and goals as of 17:36, 1 April 2015 (UTC)

Dean Lance Morgan (born 3 October 1983) is a former professional footballer who plays for Uxbridge. He was a full international for Montserrat.

== Club career ==
Morgan started his career with Colchester United, but left in September 2003, having his contract cancelled by mutual consent. He joined Reading in November 2003, before being released at the end of the 2004–05 season. He joined Luton Town in the summer of 2005. Morgan started well, scoring a late winner against Southampton on his first home appearance for the Hatters. This goal earned Morgan the club's Goal of the Season award. Despite this, Morgan proved an unpopular face at Kenilworth Road following rumors of an altercation with club captain Kevin Nicholls and displays of petulance on pitch leading some fans to feel his had a poor attitude.

Despite interest from other teams, Morgan signed a new deal at Luton on 16 February 2007, keeping him at Luton until the summer of 2009.

On 16 November 2007, Morgan signed on loan for Southend United until January 2008. He scored three goals for Southend, all of which came in the FA Cup in games against Oxford United (scoring once) and Dagenham & Redbridge (scoring twice). On 3 January 2008, Leeds United manager Dennis Wise confirmed that Morgan was one of his transfer targets in the transfer window, but Morgan remained at Luton as Leeds would not meet his wage demands, despite Luton being willing to release him on a free transfer. This was not the first time Wise had attempted to bring Morgan to Leeds, having also tried to sign him during the 2006–07 season. On 7 March 2008 Morgan signed for Crewe Alexandra on loan for the rest of the season, where he scored once against Gillingham.

Morgan was contracted to Luton until the end of the 2008–09 season, but never made another first-team appearance for the Hatters. On 29 August 2008, Morgan joined Leyton Orient on loan until January 2009, later extended to the end of the season. He played 34 games for the O's from left midfield, scoring five goals.

Morgan was released on a free transfer by Luton on 27 May 2009. Subsequently, he signed for Conference Premier club Grays Athletic on 10 August. Morgan made just two appearances for Grays, scoring once against Tamworth before being released. In September 2009, Morgan joined Milton Keynes Dons on trial, before signing on non-contract terms. Morgan scored his first goal for the club in a 2–1 win over former club Leyton Orient on 12 December 2009, and followed this up with his second goal against Premier League side Burnley in the FA Cup on 2 January 2010. On 25 March 2010, Morgan signed for Aldershot Town on loan, until the end of the season. He scored his first goal for Aldershot Town in the 3–0 win over Rotherham United on 5 April.

He was released by MK Dons when his contract expired at the end of the season.

=== Chesterfield ===
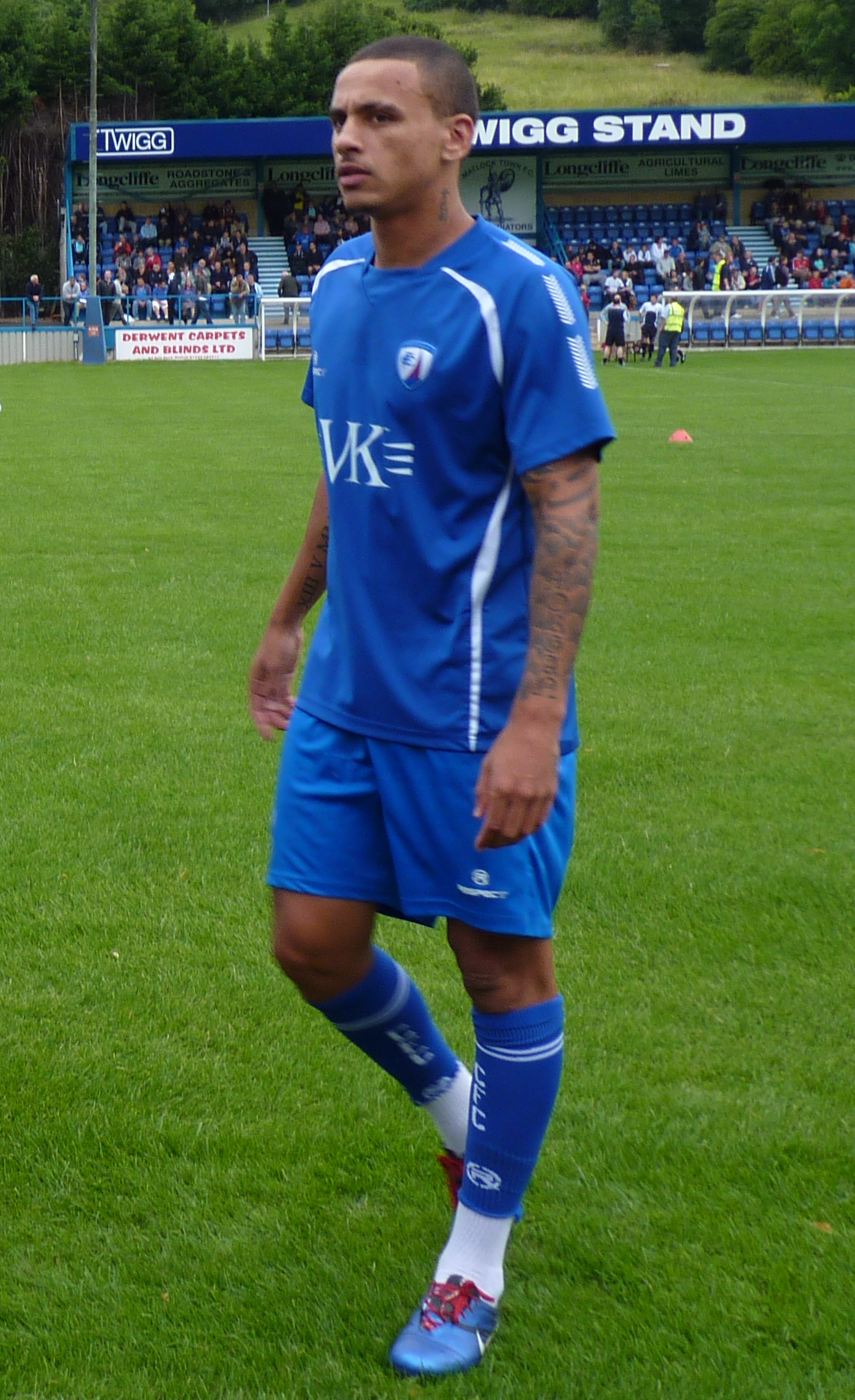
Morgan playing for Chesterfield in 2011

Despite being offered a contract by Aldershot he decided to sign for Chesterfield, making his debut on 21 August 2010 in a 4–0 victory at home to Hereford United. He scored his first goal in the 1–2 away win at Walsall, Morgan skipped past Darryl Westlake and Richard Taundry on 33 minutes, his fierce drive going inside goalkeeper Jonny Brain's near post, putting his side through to the next round of the Football League Trophy

On 8 March 2012, Morgan signed on loan for League Two side Oxford United. He came on as a substitute to make his debut against Bradford City at Valley Parade, in which they lost 2–1. He was released by Chesterfield at the end of the 2011–12 season.

=== Wycombe Wanderers ===
In September 2012 Morgan joined Conference Premier side Grimsby Town on trial and was expected to play for the club's reserve team in a league match at Gateshead. However prior to the game Morgan announced via his Twitter account that he would not be playing for the club and had decided to trial elsewhere.

The following day Morgan penned a short-term deal with Wycombe Wanderers. He has since established himself as a key player in the side as Wycombe's form picked up after their poor start to the season and signed a contract extension keeping him at the club until the summer on 3 January 2013. Morgan was offered a deal to the end of the 2012–13 season and went on to sign another year.

He was released by Wycombe on 14 May 2014, after the expiry of his contract.

=== Woking ===
In August 2014, Morgan signed for Woking the day before the start of the 2014–15 season, and was in the matchday squad for the opening fixture away v Alfreton. Dean then went on to score the equalising goal before setting up another for strike partner Scott Rendell in a 3–1 win.

On 23 January 2015, Morgan joined League One club Crawley Town on loan until the end of the season.

=== Newport County ===
On 10 February 2016 Morgan joined Newport County. He made his Newport debut on 13 February as a late substitute in the 1–0 win versus Carlisle United. He scored his first goal for Newport in the 3–0 win at Portsmouth on 12 March 2016. He was released by Newport on 10 May 2016 at the end of his contract.

=== Throttur FC ===
On 16 May 2016, Morgan joined Icelandic club Throttur FC.

=== Non-League ===
In July 2023, Morgan signed for Isthmian League South Central Division club Uxbridge following an impressive season with St. Panteleimon.

== International career ==
In May 2014, he was called up by the Montserrat national football team to face U.S. Virgin Islands and Bonaire in the preliminary round of the 2014 Caribbean Cup qualification phase.

== Honours ==
Chesterfield

- Football League Two: 2010–11
