= Dwayne Mattis =

Footballer (born 1981)

Personal information
- Full name: Dwayne Anthony Mattis
- Date of birth: 31 July 1981 (age 45)
- Place of birth: Huddersfield, England
- Height: 1.85 m (6 ft 1 in)
- Position: Midfielder

Youth career
- Huddersfield Town

Senior career*
Years	Team	Apps	(Gls)
1998–2004	Huddersfield Town	69	(2)
2004–2007	Bury	97	(11)
2007–2008	Barnsley	4	(0)
2007	→ Walsall (loan)	4	(0)
2008–2010	Walsall	71	(6)
2010–2012	Chesterfield	45	(3)
2012	Macclesfield Town	1	(1)
Total		291	(23)

International career
2002	Republic of Ireland U21	2	(0)
- * Club domestic league appearances and goals

Dwayne Anthony Mattis (born 31 July 1981) is a former professional footballer who played as a midfielder. Born in England, he made two appearances for the Republic of Ireland U21 national team.

== Career ==
Mattis began his career as a trainee with Huddersfield Town, debuting on 1 May 1998 in the First Division match which Huddersfield drew 2–2 with Crystal Palace. Mattis came on as a 38th-minute substitute for Jon Dyson.

Mattis played his second match - the final game of 1998–99 - eight days later, but did not play again until the second game of 2001–02, more than two years later. However, this was the breakthrough season for Mattis, who played a total of 29 league matches that season. Another full season followed, but in 2003–04 Mattis played only five games, including just one full match - the 6–2 defeat at Scunthorpe United.

Released at the season's end, Mattis joined Bury and made his debut on 7 August 2004 in the 3–1 home win over Yeovil Town. He has appeared regularly for the club since then.

Mattis has represented the Republic of Ireland at under-21 level.

On 10 January 2007, Mattis joined Barnsley after two unsuccessful bids despite offers from MK Dons. The final fee was £50,000 rising to £75,000 if Barnsley avoid relegation, plus a 20% sell on fee.

In September 2007 he signed for Walsall on a month-long loan deal but suffered a broken leg in a 0–0 draw with Tranmere Rovers and was sent back to Barnsley where he is expected to be out for three months.

Mattis was released by Barnsley on 30 June 2008, after having his contract terminated by mutual consent. On 3 July 2008, he signed a permanent contract with Walsall returning to the club he had a successful loan spell with during the previous season. He was released by Walsall on 10 May 2010 along with six other players. He signed a two-year deal with Chesterfield F.C. on 21 May 2010. He made a flying start to his Chesterfield career, scoring in his first three games against Barnet in the league, against Middlesbrough in the League Cup and Port Vale in the league.

Following an injury and subsequent operation, appearances in the first team were limited and in January 2012, his contract was cancelled by mutual consent. On 20 January 2012, he signed a contract until the end of the 2011–12 season with Macclesfield. In May 2012, Mattis was released by Macclesfield due to the expiry of his contract.

== Honours ==
Chesterfield

- Football League Two: 2010–11

Individual

- Bury Player of the Season: 2004–05
