= 2016 FA Trophy final =

2016 FA Trophy Final
- Event: 2015–16 FA Trophy
| FC Halifax Town | Grimsby Town |
| 1 | 0 |
- Date: 22 May 2016
- Venue: Wembley Stadium, London
- Man of the Match: Nicky Wroe (FC Halifax Town)
- Referee: Lee Mason (Lancashire)
- Attendance: 46,781 (including FA Vase Final)

The 2015–16 FA Trophy Final was the 47th final of the FA Trophy. The match was contested by FC Halifax Town and Grimsby Town. Grimsby Town were beaten finalists in 2013, but it was FC Halifax Town's first final and their first visit to Wembley Stadium. For the first time the final of the FA Vase was played on the same day at the same venue, contested by Hereford and Morpeth Town. Both matches were televised in the UK on BT Sport.

FC Halifax Town defeated Tamworth, Barrow, Chester, Gateshead and Nantwich Town en route to the final.

Grimsby Town defeated Solihull Moors, Weston-super-Mare, Havant & Waterlooville, Woking, and Bognor Regis Town en route to the final.

FC Halifax Town won the match 1–0 thanks to a goal from Scott McManus after 48 minutes.

== Route to the final ==
=== FC Halifax Town ===
| 15 December 2015 1R | FC Halifax Town | 5–0 | Tamworth | Halifax |
| 19:45 GMT | James 12', 87'; McDonald 28'; Wroe 57'; Hughes 73' | Report | | Stadium: The Shay; Attendance: 439; Referee: Paul Marsden (Lancashire) |

| 19 January 2016 2R | FC Halifax Town | 1–0 | Barrow | Halifax |
| 19:45 GMT | Tuton 68' | Report | | Stadium: The Shay; Attendance: 673; Referee: Joseph Johnson (Merseyside) |

| 10 February 2016 3R | FC Halifax Town | 1–0 | Chester | Halifax |
| 19:45 GMT | Burrow 45+2' | Report | | Stadium: The Shay; Attendance: 878; Referee: Michael Salisbury (Lancashire) |

| 27 February 2016 QF | FC Halifax Town | 0–0 | Gateshead | Halifax |
| 15:00 GMT | | Report | | Stadium: The Shay; Attendance: 1,431; Referee: Steve Rushton (Staffordshire) |

| 2 March 2016 QFR | Gateshead | 3–3 (a.e.t.) (4–5 p) | FC Halifax Town | Gateshead |
| 19:45 GMT | Gillies 3', 105'; Bowman 50' | Report | James 22'; Hughes 90+2'; McDonald 93' | Stadium: Gateshead International Stadium; Attendance: 724; Referee: Ryan Johnson (Greater Manchester) |
| | Penalties |
| | Hamilton (penalty scored); Gillies (penalty scored); McLaughlin (penalty scored); Johnson (penalty missed); Shaw (penalty scored); Clark (penalty missed) | | Burrow (penalty scored); Wroe (penalty scored); James (penalty scored); McManus (penalty scored); McDonald (penalty missed); Brown (penalty scored) |

| 12 March 2016 SF 1 | Nantwich Town | 2–4 | FC Halifax Town | Nantwich |
| 15:15 GMT | Cooke 43'; Kosylo 77' | Report | McManus 3'; Fairhurst 21'; Burrow 46', 61' (pen.) | Stadium: The Weaver Stadium; Attendance: 2,078; Referee: Graham Salisbury (Lancashire) |

| 19 March 2016 SF 2 | FC Halifax Town | 2–2 (6–4 agg.) | Nantwich Town | Halifax |
| 15:00 GMT | Burrow 3' (penalty missed) 44'; White 89' (o.g.) | Report | Shotton 10'; Bailey 31' | Stadium: The Shay; Attendance: 3,009; Referee: Peter Bankes (Merseyside) |

=== Grimsby Town ===
| 12 December 2015 1R | Grimsby Town | 1–1 | Solihull Moors | Cleethorpes |
| 15:00 GMT | Alabi 66' | Report | Brown 14' | Stadium: Blundell Park; Attendance: 1,071; Referee: David Rock (Hertfordshire) |

| 22 December 2015 1RR | Solihull Moors | 2–3 | Grimsby Town | Solihull |
| 19:45 GMT | Armson 62'; Asante 80' (pen.) | Report | Bogle 64'; Alabi 66' (pen.); Mackreth 68' | Stadium: Damson Park; Attendance: 479; Referee: Derek Eaton (Gloucestershire) |

| 16 January 2016 2R | Grimsby Town | 3–1 | Weston-super-Mare | Cleethorpes |
| 15:00 GMT | Henderson 12'; Bogle 45'; Pittman 61' | Report | Grubb 22' | Stadium: Blundell Park; Attendance: 1,230; Referee: Ollie Yates (Staffordshire) |

| 6 February 2016 3R | Grimsby Town | 3–0 | Havant & Waterlooville | Cleethorpes |
| 15:00 GMT | Pittman 73'; Nolan 87'; Swallow 89' (o.g.) | Report | | Stadium: Blundell Park; Attendance: 1,613; Referee: Adrian Holmes (West Yorkshire) |

| 27 February 2016 QF | Grimsby Town | 2–0 | Woking | Cleethorpes |
| 15:00 GMT | Arnold 10', 35' | Report | | Stadium: Blundell Park; Attendance: 1,675; Referee: Martin Coy (Durham) |

| 12 March 2016 SF 1 | Bognor Regis Town | 0–1 | Grimsby Town | Bognor Regis |
| 15:00 GMT | | Report | Arnold 75' | Stadium: Nyewood Lane; Attendance: 2,629; Referee: Simon Hooper (Wiltshire) |

| 19 March 2016 SF 2 | Grimsby Town | 2–1 (3–1 agg.) | Bognor Regis Town | Cleethorpes |
| 15:00 GMT | Amond 8' (pen.), 78' | Report | Beck 31' | Stadium: Blundell Park; Attendance: 2,477; Referee: Mark Heywood (Cheshire) |

== Match ==
=== Details ===
22 May 2016
16:15 BST

| FC Halifax Town | 1–0 | Grimsby Town |
|---|---|---|
| McManus 48' | Report |

Wembley Stadium, London
Attendance: 46,781 (including FA Vase Final)
Referee: Lee Mason (Lancashire)

| FC Halifax Town | Grimsby Town |

| GK | 23 | (England) Sam Johnson |
| RB | 2 | (England) James Bolton |
| CB | 14 | (England) Matty Brown |
| CB | 15 | (England) Kevin Roberts |
| CB | 6 | (Algeria) Hamza Bencherif |
| LB | 3 | (England) Scott McManus | (substituted off) 74' |
| CM | 16 | (England) Jake Hibbs |
| CM | 35 | (England) Nicky Wroe (c) |
| RW | 17 | (England) Josh Macdonald | (substituted off) 62' |
| LW | 12 | (Wales) Richard Peniket | (substituted off) 85' |
| CF | 9 | (England) Jordan Burrow |
Substitutes:
| GK | 1 | (England) Jordan Porter |
| MF | 4 | (England) Kingsley James | (substituted on) 74' |
| MF | 11 | (England) Sam Walker | (substituted on) 62' |
| MF | 24 | (England) Connor Hughes | (substituted on) 85' |
| FW | 40 | (England) Shaq McDonald |
Manager:
(Northern Ireland) Jim Harvey

| GK | 1 | (Republic of Ireland) James McKeown |
| RB | 2 | (Scotland) Richard Tait | | (substituted off) 81' |
| CB | 5 | (England) Shaun Pearson |
| CB | 22 | (Democratic Republic of the Congo) Aristote Nsiala |
| LB | 3 | (Scotland) Gregor Robertson |
| RM | 31 | (England) Jon Nolan | (yellow card) 54' |
| CM | 8 | (England) Craig Disley (c) |
| CM | 16 | (England) Craig Clay | | (substituted off) 62' |
| LM | 11 | (England) Andy Monkhouse | | (substituted off) 68' |
| RS | 9 | (England) Omar Bogle |
| LS | 10 | (Republic of Ireland) Pádraig Amond |
Substitutes:
| DF | 6 | (England) Josh Gowling |
| DF | 23 | (England) Danny East | | (substituted on) 81' |
| MF | 17 | (England) Josh Venney |
| MF | 20 | (England) Nathan Arnold | | (substituted on) 62' |
| FW | 18 | (England) Jon-Paul Pittman | | (substituted on) 68' |
Manager:
(England) Paul Hurst

Man of the match

- Nicky Wroe (FC Halifax Town)

Match officials

- Assistant referees:
  - Adam Nunn (Wiltshire)
  - Matthew Wilkes (West Midlands)
- Fourth official: Ross Joyce (Cleveland)

Match rules

- 90 minutes.
- 30 minutes of extra-time if necessary.
- Penalty shoot-out if scores still level.
- Five named substitutes.
- Maximum of three substitutions.
