= 2015–16 FA Trophy =

FA Challenge Trophy

Tournament details
- Country: England; Guernsey; Wales
- Teams: 276

Final positions
- Champions: FC Halifax Town
- Runners-up: Grimsby Town

The 2015–16 FA Trophy was the 46th season of the FA Trophy, the Football Association's cup competition for teams at levels 5–8 of the English football league system. A total of 276 clubs entered the competition, which was won by FC Halifax Town after beating Grimsby Town 1-0 in front of 46,781 spectators at Wembley in the final on 22 May 2016.

== Calendar ==
Round	Main date	Number of fixtures	Clubs	New entries this round	Prize money
Preliminary round	3 October 2015	64	276 → 212	128	£2,500
First round qualifying	31 October 2015	72	212 → 140	80	£2,700
Second round qualifying	14 November 2015	36	140 → 104	none	£3,250
Third round qualifying	28 November 2015	40	104 → 64	44	£4,000
First round proper	12 December 2015	32	64 → 32	24	£5,000
Second round proper	16 January 2016	16	32 → 16	none	£6,000
Third round proper	6 February 2016	8	16 → 8	none	£7,000
Fourth round proper	27 February 2016	4	8 → 4	none	£8,000
Semi-finals	12 March and 19 March 2016	2	4 → 2	none	£16,000
Final	22 May 2016	1	2 → 1	none	Runner-up £25,000; Winner £50,000

== Preliminary round ==
A total of 128 clubs, from Level 8 of English football, entered preliminary round of the competition. Eight clubs from level 8 get a bye to the first round qualifying - AFC Hornchurch, Bedford Town, Brighouse Town, Chatham Town, Goole, Kings Langley, Peacehaven & Telscombe and Swindon Supermarine.

Tie	Home team (tier)	Score	Away team (tier)	Att.
1	Burscough (8)	2–0	Bamber Bridge (8)	212
2	Ossett Town (8)	1–2	Warrington Town (8)	101
3	Shaw Lane Aquaforce (8)	3–0	New Mills (8)	165
4	Lancaster City (8)	1–1	Northwich Victoria (8)	189
replay	Northwich Victoria (8)	4–0	Lancaster City (8)	123
5	Farsley Celtic (8)	4–0	Prescot Cables (8)	115
6	Witton Albion (8)	2–2	Ossett Albion (8)	193
replay	Ossett Albion (8)	0–2	Witton Albion (8)	101
7	Sheffield (8)	4–1	Trafford (8)	177
8	Mossley (8)	1–0	Harrogate Railway Athletic (8)	107
9	Glossop North End (8)	1–1	Spennymoor Town (8)	369
replay	Spennymoor Town (8)	3–2	Glossop North End (8)	385
10	Clitheroe (8)	1–2	Stocksbridge Park Steels (8)	186
11	Radcliffe Borough (8)	2–1	Droylsden (8)	137
12	Kendal Town (8)	4–0	Scarborough Athletic (8)	213
13	Newcastle Town (8)	5–4	Spalding United (8)	60
14	St Ives Town (8)	4–2	Rugby Town (8)	205
15	Stafford Rangers (8)	3–1	Tividale (8)	420
16	Soham Town Rangers (8)	1–3	Carlton Town (8)	75
17	Leek Town (8)	1–3	Lincoln United (8)	207
18	Loughborough Dynamo (8)	0–3	Kidsgrove Athletic (8)	90
19	AFC Rushden & Diamonds (8)	1–3	Basford United (8)	391
20	Romulus (8)	0–0	Gresley (8)	113
replay	Gresley (8)	2–1	Romulus (8)	152
21	Belper Town (8)	1–0	Market Drayton Town (8)	168
22	Coalville Town (8)	3–2	Daventry Town (8)	128
23	Chasetown (8)	1–1	Evesham United (8)	203
replay	Evesham United (8)	2–1	Chasetown (8)	163
24	Northwood (8)	1–1	Potters Bar Town (8)	96
replay	Potters Bar Town (8)	0–1	Northwood (8)	69
25	Thurrock (8)	2–0	Guernsey (8)	122
26	Witham Town (8)	2–4	Herne Bay (8)	112
27	Arlesey Town (8)	1–1	Redbridge (8)	89
replay	Redbridge (8)	2–0	Arlesey Town (8)	61
28	Hanwell Town (8)	1–2	Cheshunt (8)	48
29	Walton Casuals (8)	1–0	Sittingbourne (8)	85
30	Chalfont St Peter (8)	3–0	Beaconsfield SYCOB (8)	91
31	Aylesbury United (8)	1–2	Heybridge Swifts (8)	182

Tie	Home team (tier)	Score	Away team (tier)	Att.
32	Whyteleafe (8)	0–1	Phoenix Sports (8)	86
33	Corinthian Casuals (8)	2–1	Three Bridges (8)	102
34	Barton Rovers (8)	1–1	AFC Sudbury (8)	121
replay	AFC Sudbury (8)	4–3	Barton Rovers (8)	133
35	Royston Town (8)	3–0	Great Wakering Rovers (8)	108
36	Wroxham (8)	2–3	Hastings United (8)	112
37	Maldon & Tiptree (8)	2–3	Ramsgate (8)	122
38	Faversham Town (8)	0–1	Bury Town (8)	174
39	Carshalton Athletic (8)	0–2	Leighton Town (8)	110
40	Folkestone Invicta (8)	1–1	Haringey Borough (8)	244
replay	Haringey Borough (8)	1–0	Folkestone Invicta (8)	70
41	Dereham Town (8)	1–2	Waltham Abbey (8)	99
42	Tooting & Mitcham United (8)	3–2	Walton & Hersham (8)	136
43	Tilbury (8)	5–0	Barkingside (8)	54
44	Chipstead (8)	2–1	Uxbridge (8)	40
45	Whitstable Town (8)	2–4	Worthing (8)	154
46	Harlow Town (8)	3–1	Ware (8)	284
47	Thamesmead Town (8)	1–1	Brightlingsea Regent (8)	38
replay	Brightlingsea Regent (8)	1–4	Thamesmead Town (8)	53
48	Romford (8)	3–2	North Greenford United (8)	76
49	Cray Wanderers (8)	2–3	East Grinstead Town (8)	76
50	Aveley (8)	1–4	South Park (8)	42
51	Aylesbury (8)	3–0	Hythe Town (8)	78
52	Tiverton Town (8)	2–0	AFC Totton (8)	180
53	Slimbridge (8)	0–1	Egham Town (8)	45
54	Taunton Town (8)	4–1	Godalming Town (8)	215
55	Bishop's Cleeve (8)	2–4	North Leigh (8)	66
56	Yate Town (8)	1–3	Banbury United (8)	141
57	Molesey (8)	5–1	Fleet Town (8)	67
58	Larkhall Athletic (8)	3–1	Wimborne Town (8)	94
59	Bashley (8)	1–0	Cinderford Town (8)	75
60	Mangotsfield United (8)	4–3	Shortwood United (8)	103
61	Marlow (8)	5–2	Wantage Town (8)	86
62	Didcot Town (8)	0–0	Bridgwater Town (8)	118
replay	Bridgwater Town (8)	1–3	Didcot Town (8)	107
63	Burnham (8)	0–2	Dorking Wanderers (8)	41
64	Petersfield Town (8)	1–3	Winchester City (8)	136

== First round qualifying ==
First round qualifying fixtures were due to be played on 31 October 2015, with replays taking place no later than 6 November. A total of 144 teams took part in this stage of the competition including 64 winners from the preliminary round, 72 teams from Level 7 of English football and eight teams from level 8, who get a bye in the previous round.

Tie	Home team (tier)	Score	Away team (tier)	Att.
1	Marine (7)	1–0	Sheffield (8)	259
2	Witton Albion (8)	1–2	Radcliffe Borough (8)	153
3	Buxton (7)	2–1	Frickley Athletic (7)	151
4	Blyth Spartans (7)	4–0	Kendal Town (8)	442
5	Shaw Lane Aquaforce (8)	4–3	Farsley Celtic (8)	182
6	Workington (7)	0–3	Whitby Town (7)	343
7	Northwich Victoria (8)	1–2	Stocksbridge Park Steels (8)	168
8	Nantwich Town (7)	2–1	Salford City (7)	550
9	Spennymoor Town (8)	6–0	Goole (8)	411
10	Ashton United (7)	2–2	Ramsbottom United (7)	138
replay	Ramsbottom United (7)	2–2 (9–10 p)	Ashton United (7)	151
11	Skelmersdale United (7)	3–3	Hyde United (7)	209
replay	Hyde United (7)	A–A	Skelmersdale United (7)	
Tie abandoned after 22 minutes due to fog
replay	Hyde United (7)	0–1	Skelmersdale United (7)	224
12	Warrington Town (8)	2–0	Brighouse Town (8)	235
13	Burscough (8)	1–0	Colwyn Bay (7)	156
14	Darlington 1883 (7)	3–2	Mossley (8)	635
15	Leamington (7)	6–1	Barwell (7)	291
16	Cambridge City (7)	0–1	Ilkeston (7)	232
17	Sutton Coldfield Town (7)	2–0	Coalville Town (8)	138
18	Evesham United (8)	1–0	Redditch United (7)	302
19	Carlton Town (8)	2–1	Stamford (7)	96
20	Belper Town (8)	1–1	King's Lynn Town (7)	236
replay	King's Lynn Town (7)	5–1	Belper Town (8)	376
21	Histon (7)	0–0	Stratford Town (7)	187
replay	Stratford Town (7)	4–1	Histon (7)	133
22	Basford United (8)	3–1	Grantham Town (7)	162
23	St Ives Town (8)	0–1	Kettering Town (7)	325
24	Rushall Olympic (7)	1–0	Mickleover Sports (7)	101
25	Stafford Rangers (8)	1–1	Lincoln United (8)	414
replay	Lincoln United (8)	1–1 (5–4 p)	Stafford Rangers (8)	111
26	Halesowen Town (7)	1–2	Stourbridge (7)	808
27	Newcastle Town (8)	2–2	Kidsgrove Athletic (8)	132
replay	Kidsgrove Athletic (8)	3–0	Newcastle Town (8)	190
28	Matlock Town (7)	2–0	Gresley (8)	242
29	St Neots Town (7)	2–0	Bedworth United (7)	215
30	Northwood (8)	1–3	Bedford Town (8)	91
31	East Thurrock United (7)	4–0	South Park (8)	68
32	Corinthian Casuals (8)	4–1	Redbridge (8)	76
33	Chipstead (8)	1–2	Hastings United (8)	94
34	Leatherhead (7)	1–5	Kingstonian (7)	260
35	Enfield Town (7)	4–0	Leighton Town (8)	312
36	Aylesbury (8)	1–1	Brentwood Town (7)	66
replay	Brentwood Town (7)	2–0	Aylesbury (8)	89

Tie	Home team (tier)	Score	Away team (tier)	Att.
37	Phoenix Sports (8)	1–1	Tonbridge Angels (7)	244
replay	Tonbridge Angels (7)	2–0	Phoenix Sports (8)	339
38	Herne Bay (8)	1–1	Walton Casuals (8)	117
replay	Walton Casuals (8)	2–3	Herne Bay (8)	46
39	AFC Hornchurch (8)	2–3	Metropolitan Police (7)	110
40	Thurrock (8)	3–0	Chatham Town (8)	84
41	VCD Athletic (7)	2–1	Staines Town (7)	102
42	Chalfont St Peter (8)	1–3	Waltham Abbey (8)	59
43	Cheshunt (8)	2–0	Heybridge Swifts (8)	112
44	Billericay Town (7)	0–2	Chesham United (7)	271
45	Thamesmead Town (8)	1–0	Ramsgate (8)	96
46	East Grinstead Town (8)	0–3	Bognor Regis Town (7)	249
Tie played at Bognor Regis Town
47	Tilbury (8)	2–1	Tooting & Mitcham United (8)	101
48	Dunstable Town (7)	1–3	Haringey Borough (8)	76
49	Hitchin Town (7)	3–2	Burgess Hill Town (7)	190
50	Lewes (7)	0–0	Hampton & Richmond Borough (7)	325
replay	Hampton & Richmond Borough (7)	2–1	Lewes (7)	171
51	Grays Athletic (7)	2–1	Biggleswade Town (7)	151
52	Romford (8)	0–4	Slough Town (7)	134
53	Wingate & Finchley (7)	0–2	Royston Town (8)	103
54	Harrow Borough (7)	0–3	Dulwich Hamlet (7)	185
55	Hendon (7)	0–1	AFC Sudbury (8)	182
56	Worthing (8)	1–3	Leiston (7)	311
57	Merstham (7)	0–0	Harlow Town (8)	123
replay	Harlow Town (8)	6–2	Merstham (7)	210
58	Bury Town (8)	2–0	Kings Langley (8)	272
59	Needham Market (7)	0–2	Canvey Island (7)	191
60	Paulton Rovers (7)	2–3	Swindon Supermarine (8)	101
61	Molesey (8)	1–0	Didcot Town (8)	95
62	Taunton Town (8)	1–1	Dorking Wanderers (8)	194
replay	Dorking Wanderers (8)	1–3	Taunton Town (8)	118
63	Hungerford Town (7)	0–0	Banbury United (8)	128
replay	Banbury United (8)	0–3	Hungerford Town (7)	170
64	Cirencester Town (7)	2–1	North Leigh (8)	85
65	Dorchester Town (7)	2–1	Chippenham Town (7)	254
66	Mangotsfield United (8)	6–1	Bashley (8)	111
67	Egham Town (8)	1–2	Frome Town (7)	72
68	Merthyr Town (7)	1–0	Poole Town (7)	270
69	Peacehaven & Telscombe (8)	0–3	Tiverton Town (8)	130
70	Winchester City (8)	1–2	Weymouth (7)	349
71	Bideford (7)	1–1	Farnborough (7)	182
replay	Farnborough (7)	2–2 (4–5 p)	Bideford (7)	115
72	Marlow (8)	3–0	Larkhall Athletic (8)	105

== Second round qualifying ==
Second round qualifying fixtures were due to be played on 14 November 2015, with replays taking place no later than 20 November. A total of 72 teams took part in this stage of the competition, all winners from the first qualifying round. The draw was as follows:

Tie	Home team (tier)	Score	Away team (tier)	Att.
1	Blyth Spartans (7)	1–0	Whitby Town (7)	643
2	Ashton United (7)	2–1	Stratford Town (7)	112
3	Evesham United (8)	1–2	Spennymoor Town (8)	294
4	Buxton (7)	5–1	Radcliffe Borough (8)	183
5	Skelmersdale United (7)	4–2	Lincoln United (8)	185
6	Sutton Coldfield Town (7)	1–0	Darlington 1883 (7)	360
7	Nantwich Town (7)	5–1	King's Lynn Town (7)	329
8	Shaw Lane Aquaforce (8)	1–2	Matlock Town (7)	232
9	Leamington (7)	0–0	Rushall Olympic (7)	296
replay	Rushall Olympic (7)	2–3 (a.e.t.)	Leamington (7)	181
10	Warrington Town (8)	3–0	Basford United (8)	202
11	Marine (7)	2–2	Kidsgrove Athletic (8)	274
replay	Kidsgrove Athletic (8)	0–1	Marine (7)	156
12	Ilkeston (7)	1–1	Stocksbridge Park Steels (8)	406
replay	Stocksbridge Park Steels (8)	3–2	Ilkeston (7)	108
13	Kettering Town (7)	0–3	Burscough (8)	435
14	Stourbridge (7)	2–0	Carlton Town (8)	428
15	Bideford (7)	3–2	Brentwood Town (7)	185
16	St Neots Town (7)	1–2	Hungerford Town (7)	207
17	Haringey Borough (8)	1–1	Hitchin Town (7)	119
replay	Hitchin Town (7)	3–0	Haringey Borough (8)	109
18	Thurrock (8)	3–2	Cheshunt (8)	77
19	Tonbridge Angels (7)	1–2	Cirencester Town (7)	372

Tie	Home team (tier)	Score	Away team (tier)	Att.
20	Enfield Town (7)	0–2	Thamesmead Town (8)	270
21	Tilbury (8)	4–2	Royston Town (8)	106
22	Leiston (7)	1–2	Corinthian Casuals (8)	185
23	Bedford Town (8)	1–4	Weymouth (7)	229
24	Swindon Supermarine (8)	2–3	Chesham United (7)	211
25	Taunton Town (8)	1–4	Bognor Regis Town (7)	351
26	Molesey (8)	4–3	Harlow Town (8)	94
27	East Thurrock United (7)	5–0	Tiverton Town (8)	141
28	Waltham Abbey (8)	0–2	Grays Athletic (7)	146
29	Dulwich Hamlet (7)	2–0	VCD Athletic (7)	795
30	Frome Town (7)	2–1	Slough Town (7)	151
31	Hampton & Richmond Borough (7)	3–1	AFC Sudbury (8)	212
32	Dorchester Town (7)	2–2	Kingstonian (7)	312
replay	Kingstonian (7)	2–1	Dorchester Town (7)	221
33	Marlow (8)	1–0	Mangotsfield United (8)	118
34	Canvey Island (7)	0–2	Metropolitan Police (7)	187
35	Hastings United (8)	A–A	Merthyr Town (7)	281
Tie abandoned at halftime due to waterlogged pitch
35	Hastings United (8)	1–2	Merthyr Town (7)	150
36	Bury Town (8)	1–1	Herne Bay (8)	316
replay	Herne Bay (8)	1–1 (3–4 p)	Bury Town (8)	131

== Third round qualifying ==
Third round qualifying fixtures were due to be played on 28 November 2015, with replays taking place no later than 4 December. A total of 80 teams took part in this stage of the competition, all winners from the second round qualifying and 44 clubs from Level 6 of English football. The draw was as follows:

Tie	Home team (tier)	Score	Away team (tier)	Att.
1	F.C. United of Manchester (6)	1–2	AFC Telford United (6)	1,034
2	Solihull Moors (6)	1–0	Boston United (6)	319
3	Leamington (7)	4–2	Hednesford Town (6)	308
4	Stourbridge (7)	4–2	Spennymoor Town (8)	393
5	Harrogate Town (6)	0–1	Curzon Ashton (6)	237
6	Marine (7)	1–2	Burscough (8)	294
7	Corby Town (6)	2–6	Tamworth (6)	335
8	Gainsborough Trinity (6)	0–0	Ashton United (7)	307
replay	Ashton United (7)	3–1	Gainsborough Trinity (6)	106
9	Brackley Town (6)	0–2	Worcester City (6)	227
10	Chorley (6)	0–0	Skelmersdale United (7)	559
replay	Skelmersdale United (7)	5–2	Chorley (6)	559
11	Warrington Town (8)	0–2	AFC Fylde (6)	297
12	Buxton (7)	A–A	Bradford Park Avenue (6)	203
Tie abandoned at halftime due to waterlogged pitch
12	Buxton (7)	1–2	Bradford Park Avenue (6)	205
13	Matlock Town (7)	4–2	Blyth Spartans (7)	303
14	Nuneaton Town (6)	2–0	Alfreton Town (6)	467
15	Sutton Coldfield Town (7)	1–0	Stalybridge Celtic (6)	140
16	North Ferriby United (6)	1–2	Stocksbridge Park Steels (8)	252
17	Stockport County (6)	0–2	Nantwich Town (7)	1,066
18	Merthyr Town (7)	1–1	East Thurrock United (7)	225
replay	East Thurrock United (7)	3–1	Merthyr Town (7)	162
19	Hampton & Richmond Borough (7)	0–1	Maidstone United (6)	488
20	Ebbsfleet United (6)	4–1	Molesey (8)	672
21	Maidenhead United (6)	4–0	Bideford (7)	262

Tie	Home team (tier)	Score	Away team (tier)	Att.
22	Cirencester Town (7)	2–1	Gosport Borough (6)	88
23	Hungerford Town (7)	3–0	Thamesmead Town (8)	120
24	Tilbury (8)	3–0	Bishop's Stortford (6)	132
25	Weston-super-Mare (6)	4–0	Hitchin Town (7)	175
26	Oxford City (6)	6–3	Marlow (8)	177
27	Chelmsford City (6)	1–1	Gloucester City (6)	359
replay	Gloucester City (6)	0–1	Chelmsford City (6)	238
28	Lowestoft Town (6)	4–0	St Albans City (6)	420
29	Metropolitan Police (7)	0–2	Wealdstone (6)	152
30	Hemel Hempstead Town (6)	1–0	Weymouth (7)	289
31	Dartford (6)	1–2	Whitehawk (6)	601
32	Concord Rangers (6)	3–1	Sutton United (6)	202
Tie ordered replayed due to Concord Rangers using ineligible player
32	Sutton United (6)	2–0	Concord Rangers (6)	251
33	Frome Town (7)	1–1	Chesham United (7)	133
replay	Chesham United (7)	2–1	Frome Town (7)	214
34	Bury Town (8)	4–2	Thurrock (8)	319
35	Dulwich Hamlet (7)	2–1	Margate (6)	1,479
36	Grays Athletic (7)	0–0	Corinthian Casuals (8)	150
replay	Corinthian Casuals (8)	1–0	Grays Athletic (7)	127
37	Bognor Regis Town (7)	1–0	Bath City (6)	362
38	Havant & Waterlooville (6)	2–1	Basingstoke Town (6)	277
39	Hayes & Yeading United (6)	2–2	Eastbourne Borough (6)	158
replay	Eastbourne Borough (6)	4–0	Hayes & Yeading United (6)	204
40	Kingstonian (7)	0–3	Truro City (6)	316

== First round ==
First round fixtures were due to be played on 12 December 2015, with replays taking place no later than 18 December. A total of 64 teams took part in this stage of the competition, all winners from the third round qualifying and the clubs from Level 5 of English football. The draw was as follows:

Tie	Home team (tier)	Score	Away team (tier)	Att.
1	FC Halifax Town (5)	5–0	Tamworth (6)	439
2	Grimsby Town (5)	1–1	Solihull Moors (6)	1,071
replay	Solihull Moors (6)	2–3	Grimsby Town (5)	479
3	Sutton Coldfield Town (7)	0–1	Barrow (5)	326
4	Burscough (8)	2–2	Guiseley (5)	227
replay	Guiseley (5)	3–2	Burscough (8)	233
5	Macclesfield Town (5)	A–A	Ashton United (7)	607
Tie abandoned at half-time due to waterlogged pitch
5	Macclesfield Town (5)	4–0	Ashton United (7)	610
6	Nantwich Town (7)	2–0	Matlock Town (7)	423
7	Southport (5)	0–0	Worcester City (6)	270
replay	Worcester City (6)	2–3	Southport (5)	452
8	Curzon Ashton (6)	3–1	Nuneaton Town (6)	121
9	Altrincham (5)	1–1	Leamington (7)	355
replay	Leamington (7)	1–2 (a.e.t.)	Altrincham (5)	332
10	AFC Telford United (6)	0–2	Chester (5)	850
11	Stourbridge (7)	2–1	Kidderminster Harriers (5)	902
12	Gateshead (5)	4–1	Stocksbridge Park Steels (8)	199
13	AFC Fylde (6)	4–4	Skelmersdale United (7)	221
replay	Skelmersdale United (7)	0–4	AFC Fylde (6)	186
14	Bradford Park Avenue (6)	2–1	Lincoln City (5)	360

Tie	Home team (tier)	Score	Away team (tier)	Att.
15	Tranmere Rovers (5)	2–4	Wrexham (5)	3,397
16	Eastbourne Borough (6)	7–4	Hemel Hempstead Town (6)	317
17	Tilbury (8)	3–4	Welling United (5)	186
18	Truro City (6)	2–2	Cirencester Town (7)	302
replay	Cirencester Town (7)	0–1	Truro City (6)	123
19	Torquay United (5)	0–0	Chesham United (7)	1,130
replay	Chesham United (7)	0–2	Torquay United (5)	356
20	Whitehawk (6)	1–3	Dover Athletic (5)	372
21	Corinthian Casuals (8)	1–2	Hungerford Town (7)	162
22	Boreham Wood (5)	1–2	Woking (5)	275
23	Sutton United (6)	3–1	Lowestoft Town (6)	454
24	Maidstone United (6)	0–1	Bognor Regis Town (7)	892
25	Cheltenham Town (5)	3–1	Chelmsford City (6)	1,124
26	East Thurrock United (7)	1–4	Maidenhead United (6)	156
27	Oxford City (6)	3–1	Ebbsfleet United (6)	495
28	Aldershot Town (5)	0–1	Eastleigh (5)	877
29	Weston-super-Mare (6)	3–2	Wealdstone (6)	155
30	Havant & Waterlooville (6)	2–0	Forest Green Rovers (5)	266
31	Bury Town (8)	1–2	Dulwich Hamlet (7)	441
32	Braintree Town (5)	1–0	Bromley (5)	204

== Second round ==
Second round fixtures were due to be played on 16 January 2016, with replays taking place no later than 22 January. A total of 32 teams took part in this stage of the competition, all winners from the first round. The draw was as follows:

Tie	Home team (tier)	Score	Away team (tier)	Att.
1	Dulwich Hamlet (7)	1–2	Guiseley (5)	1,949
2	Dover Athletic (5)	2–1	Southport (5)	629
3	Havant & Waterlooville (6)	2–1	Welling United (5)	371
4	Truro City (6)	2–2	Macclesfield Town (5)	685
replay	Macclesfield Town (5)	2–0	Truro City (6)	507
5	Braintree Town (5)	0–1	Stourbridge (7)	244
6	Chester (5)	4–0	Hungerford Town (7)	1,276
7	Eastbourne Borough (6)	1–4	AFC Fylde (6)	352
8	Sutton United (6)	1–0	Curzon Ashton (6)	605
9	Torquay United (5)	1–0	Wrexham (5)	1,361

Tie	Home team (tier)	Score	Away team (tier)	Att.
10	Grimsby Town (5)	3–1	Weston-super-Mare (6)	1,230
11	FC Halifax Town (5)	1–0	Barrow (5)	673
12	Eastleigh (5)	1–2	Gateshead (5)	453
13	Bognor Regis Town (7)	2–1	Altrincham (5)	520
14	Bradford Park Avenue (6)	1–1	Nantwich Town (7)	207
replay	Nantwich Town (7)	5–0	Bradford Park Avenue (6)	281
15	Woking (5)	6–1	Maidenhead United (6)	1,006
16	Oxford City (6)	2–2	Cheltenham Town (5)	926
replay	Cheltenham Town (5)	0–3	Oxford City (6)	776

== Third round ==
Third round fixtures were due to be played on 6 February 2016, with replays taking place no later than 12 February. A total of 16 teams took part in this stage of the competition, all winners from the second round. The draw was as follows:

Tie	Home team (tier)	Score	Away team (tier)	Att.
1	Torquay United (5)	3–3	Macclesfield Town (5)	838
replay	Macclesfield Town (5)	0–1	Torquay United (5)	566
2	Grimsby Town (5)	3–0	Havant & Waterlooville (6)	1,613
3	Gateshead (5)	1–0	AFC Fylde (6)	485
4	FC Halifax Town (5)	1–0	Chester (5)	878
5	Woking (5)	1–0	Oxford City (6)	923

Tie	Home team (tier)	Score	Away team (tier)	Att.
6	Dover Athletic (5)	2–2	Guiseley (5)	667
replay	Guiseley (5)	0–3	Dover Athletic (5)	476
7	Sutton United (6)	0–0	Bognor Regis Town (7)	1,258
replay	Bognor Regis Town (7)	2–1 (a.e.t.)	Sutton United (6)	941
8	Nantwich Town (7)	1–0	Stourbridge (7)	510

== Fourth round ==
Fourth round fixtures were due to be played on 27 February 2016, with replays taking place no later than 4 March. A total of 8 teams took part in this stage of the competition, all winners from the third round. The draw was as follows:

Tie	Home team (tier)	Score	Away team (tier)	Att.
1	Nantwich Town (7)	2–1	Dover Athletic (5)	892
2	FC Halifax Town (5)	0–0	Gateshead (5)	1,431
replay	Gateshead (5)	3–3 (4–5 p)	FC Halifax Town (5)	724

Tie	Home team (tier)	Score	Away team (tier)	Att.
3	Grimsby Town (5)	2–0	Woking (5)	1,675
4	Bognor Regis Town (7)	1–0	Torquay United (5)	1,821

== Semi-finals ==
Semi-final fixtures were due to be played on 12 March and 19 March 2016, with the second leg going to extra time and penalties if required. A total of four teams took part in this stage of the competition. The draw was as follows:

=== First leg ===
12 March 2016
15:00 GMT

Nantwich Town (7)	2–4	FC Halifax Town (5)
Cooke 42'; Kosylo 76'	Report	McManus 2'; Fairhurst 19'; Burrow 46' 60'

Weaver Stadium, Nantwich
Attendance: 2,078
Referee: Graham Salisbury

12 March 2016
15:00 GMT

Bognor Regis Town (7)	0–1	Grimsby Town (5)
	Report	Arnold 75'

Nyewood Lane, Bognor Regis
Attendance: 2,629
Referee: Simon Hooper

=== Second leg ===
19 March 2016
15:00 GMT

FC Halifax Town (5)	2–2	Nantwich Town (7)
Burrow 4'; White 90' (o.g.)	Report	Shotton 10'; Bailey 31'

The Shay, Halifax
Attendance: 3,009
Referee: Peter Bankes

19 March 2016
15:00 GMT

Grimsby Town (5)	2–1	Bognor Regis Town (7)
Amond 8' 78'	Report	Beck 32'

Blundell Park, Cleethorpes
Attendance: 2,477
Referee: Mark Heywood

== Final ==
22 May 2016
16:15 BST

FC Halifax Town (5)	1–0	Grimsby Town (5)
McManus 48'

Wembley Stadium, London
Attendance: 46,781
Referee: Lee Mason
