= Neil Ashton (footballer) =

English footballer and manager (born 1985)

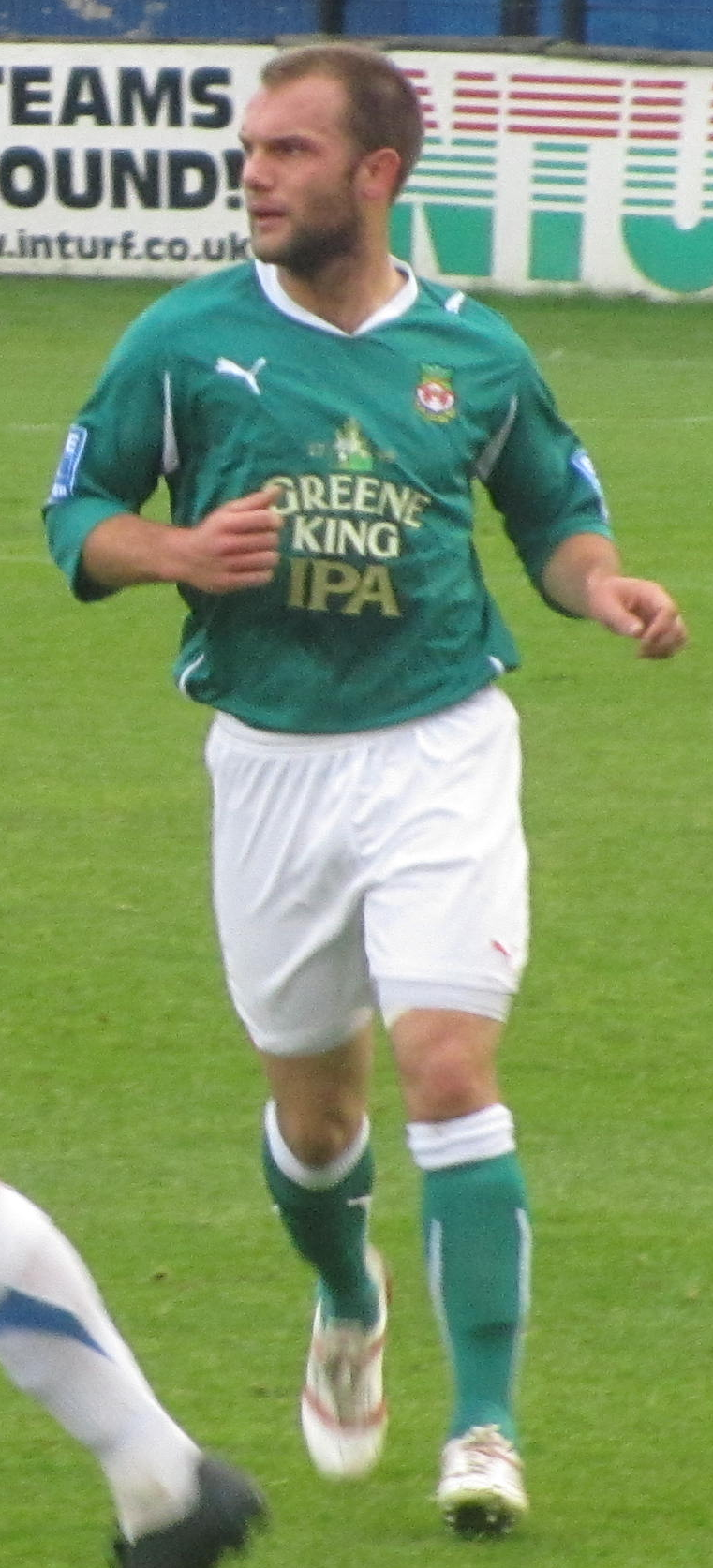
- Ashton playing for Wrexham in 2011

Personal information
- Full name: Neil John Ashton
- Date of birth: 15 January 1985 (age 41)
- Place of birth: Liverpool, England
- Positions: Full back; midfielder

Youth career
- 2001–2003: Tranmere Rovers

Senior career*
Years	Team	Apps	(Gls)
2003–2005	Tranmere Rovers	1	(0)
2004–2005	→ Shrewsbury Town (loan)	24	(0)
2005–2009	Shrewsbury Town	139	(3)
2008	→ Macclesfield Town (loan)	19	(1)
2009–2010	Chester City	0	(0)
2010–2015	Wrexham	177	(11)
2015–2016	Barrow	22	(0)
2016–2017	Southport	36	(2)
2017–2020	Cefn Druids	76	(4)
2020–2022	Llandudno	13	(2)

Managerial career
- 2022–2023: Cefn Druids
- 2023: Cefn Albion
- * Club domestic league appearances and goals as of 06:33, 27 April 2022 (UTC)

Neil John Ashton (born 15 January 1985) is an English football manager and former footballer who was most recently manager of Cefn Albion. Typically played as left-back, he occasionally acted as a midfielder. During his nearly 20-year playing career, he played with Tranmere, Shrewsbury Town, Chester City, Wrexham, Barrow, Southport, Cefn Druids and Llandudno. He won the FA Trophy with Wrexham in 2012–13.

== Career ==
=== Tranmere Rovers ===
Neil Ashton started his career with Tranmere Rovers as a youth player in 2001 and turned professional in 2003, he was part of the senior squad until 2005 making just one league appearance during his time at Prenton Park. In the 2004–05 season he was loaned out to Shrewsbury Town and made 24 appearances.

=== Shrewsbury Town ===
At the start of the 2004–05 season, the manager at that time, Gary Peters, bought in Ashton on loan from Tranmere Rovers to offer competition to left back Trevor Challis. By the end of that season, the deal was turned into a permanent one that saw Ashton make over 130 appearances in all competitions, before his subsequent move to Macclesfield Town.

In January 2008, Ashton joined Macclesfield Town on loan for the rest of the 2007–2008 campaign in a bid to find first team football. Ashton made 19 appearances, scoring once in his spell with Macclesfield.

=== Chester City ===
In the summer of 2009 Ashton signed for Chester City who had recently been relegated to the Conference Premier. However, he was left without a club on 26 February 2010 after Chester were expelled from the Football Conference after breaching five league regulations, then wound up.

=== Wrexham ===
After the demise of Chester, Ashton joined the club's fierce rivals Wrexham on trial playing twice for the reserves, impressing then manager Dean Saunders. He signed for the Conference club ahead of the 2010–2011 campaign. He took the number 3 shirt and was a regular in the side and in his first season with the Dragons Ashton made 42 appearances including playing in both legs of the defeats to Luton Town in the Conference Play-off semi-finals.

In the 2011–12 season, Ashton was part of the Wrexham side that finished second in the league gaining 98 points, but like the previous season they lost in the play-off semi finals to Luton Town. However, as a consolation to Ashton, he earned the club's player of the year award for the season after making 48 appearances including an FA Cup 3rd round match against Brighton & Hove Albion when they lost on penalties after a replay. He scored his first goal for Wrexham from the penalty spot, making it a 5–1 win against Braintree Town in what was virtually the last kick of the regular season.

In the 2012–13 season, Ashton stayed at the Racecourse and was still a regular in the Dragons defence. After the departure of regular penalty taker Jake Speight to Mansfield Town Ashton took over penalty duties scoring his first in a 2–1 loss to Blackpool in a pre-season match. He scored his first goals of the season in a game away to Stockport County with two penalties but due to "over celebrating" he picked up a second yellow card and was sent off. On 6 November 2012 Ashton signed a new 3-year contract with Wrexham which would last until 2015. His next goal came in a 4–2 FA Cup first round loss to Alfreton Town. On 8 December 2012 Ashton scored his first goal in open play against Nuneaton Town before scoring a second in the match from the penalty spot in a memorable 6–1 win. In March 2013 Ashton picked up his first career honour by winning the FA Trophy with Wrexham, Ashton played in every round but missed the final at Wembley due to injury. A month and a half later, Ashton played at Wembley in a Wrexham shirt, in a 2–0 loss to Newport County in the Conference play-off Final.

Ashton was released by Wrexham on 14 May 2015.

=== Barrow ===
On 8 June 2015, Ashton signed for Barrow for their return to the National League. He made seven appearances for the club.

=== Southport ===
The following season he joined Southport.

=== Cefn Druids ===
He then moved in 2017 back to playing in Wales, this time joining Cefn Druids in the Welsh Premier League. During his time with the club he played for them in Europe in Europa League qualifying matches.

=== Llandudno ===
In September 2020 he joined Llandudno. The 2020–21 season was cancelled after one cup game due to the coronavirus pandemic. After a full 2021–22 season playing for the club in the Cymru North he retired to concentrate on coaching and management.

== Career honours ==
Wrexham

- FA Trophy: winners 2012–13, runners-up 2014–15
