= 2015 FA Trophy final =

2015 FA Trophy Final
- Event: 2014–15 FA Trophy
North Ferriby United	Wrexham
3	3
- North Ferriby United won 5–4 on penalties
- Date: 29 March 2015
- Venue: Wembley Stadium, London
- Man of the Match: Jason St Juste (North Ferriby United)
- Referee: Michael Oliver (Northumberland)
- Attendance: 14,585

The 2014–15 FA Trophy Final was the 46th final of the Football Association's cup competition for levels 5–8 of the English football league system. The match was contested between North Ferriby United of the Conference North (level 6) and Wrexham of the Conference Premier (level 5). Wrexham won the competition in 2013 while North Ferriby made their first final appearance, having never previously gone past the quarter-final stage.

North Ferriby United won the game 5–4 on penalties.

== Match ==
=== Details ===
29 March 2015
15:00 BST

North Ferriby United	3–3 (a.e.t.)	Wrexham
King 76' (pen.); Kendall 86', 101'	Report	Moult 11', 118'; Harris 59'
Penalties
	5–4

Wembley Stadium, London
Attendance: 14,585
Referee: Michael Oliver (Northumberland)

GK	1	(England) Adam Nicklin
DF	2	(England) Sam Topliss
DF	3	(England) Josh Wilde	(substituted off) 89'
MF	4	(England) Liam King
DF	5	(England) Matt Wilson (c)
DF	6	(England) Danny Hone
MF	7	(England) Danny Clarke
MF	8	(England) Russell Fry	(substituted off) 80'
FW	9	(England) Tom Denton
MF	10	(England) Adam Bolder	(substituted off) 61'
MF	11	(Saint Kitts and Nevis) Jason St Juste
Substitutes:
FW	12	(England) Nathan Jarman	(substituted on) 61'
GK	13	(England) Tom Nicholson
DF	14	(England) Nathan Peat	(substituted on) 89'
DF	15	(England) Mark Gray
FW	16	(England) Ryan Kendall	(substituted on) 80'
Manager:
Billy Heath

GK	1	(England) Andy Coughlin
DF	3	(England) Neil Ashton
DF	4	(England) Manny Smith
DF	5	(England) Blaine Hudson
MF	6	(England) Joe Clarke	(substituted off) 112'
MF	8	(England) Jay Harris
FW	9	(England) Louis Moult
MF	12	(England) Dean Keates (c)	(substituted off) 72'
DF	14	(England) Steve Tomassen
FW	24	(England) Connor Jennings
MF	27	(England) Kieron Morris	(substituted off) 87'
Substitutes:
MF	2	(England) Mark Carrington
FW	10	(England) Andy Bishop	(substituted on) 112'
MF	15	(Wales) Rob Evans	(substituted on) 72'
FW	16	(England) Wes York	(substituted on) 87'
DF	26	(England) Luke Waterfall
Manager:
(England) Kevin Wilkin

Man of the match

Match officials

- Assistant referees:
- Fourth official:

Match rules

- 90 minutes.
- 30 minutes of extra-time if necessary.
- Penalty shoot-out if scores still level.
- Five named substitutes.
- Maximum of three substitutions.
