= Jay Harris (footballer, born 1987) =

English footballer

Personal information
- Full name: James William Harris
- Date of birth: 15 April 1987 (age 39)
- Place of birth: Liverpool, England
- Height: 5 ft 7 in (1.70 m)
- Position: Midfielder

Team information
- Current team: Warrington Town

Youth career
- –2005: Everton

Senior career*
Years	Team	Apps	(Gls)
2005–2006	Everton	0	(0)
2006–2008	Accrington Stanley	73	(2)
2008–2009	Chester City	31	(0)
2010–2015	Wrexham	181	(16)
2015–2019	Tranmere Rovers	127	(8)
2019–2020	Macclesfield Town	25	(1)
2020–2021	Wrexham	37	(1)
2021–	Warrington Town	70	(7)
- * Club domestic league appearances and goals as of 10:20, 30 December 2023 (UTC)

James William Harris (born 15 April 1987) is an English professional footballer who plays as a midfielder for Warrington Town.

== Career ==
=== Everton ===
Jay Harris started his career as a youth player with Everton, he became a senior player in 2006 but left Goodison Park.

=== Accrington Stanley ===
In the summer of 2006 Harris joined Accrington Stanley. He made his full Accrington debut against Barnet on 12 August 2006. In May 2007 he signed a new two-year contract, but at the end of the 2007–08 season, he was released by the club, together with ten other first-team players.

=== Chester City ===
On 25 June 2008, he joined Chester City on a two-year contract along with Accrington teammate David Mannix. He featured in more than 30 of Chester's games in 2008–09 as the club suffered relegation from the Football League. In February 2010 Chester were expelled from the Conference for breaching five league rules and so the club was liquidated leaving Harris without a club.

On 7 April 2009, Harris was one of five players charged with breaching Football Association rules on betting relating to the Accrington against Bury match on the final day of the 2007–08 season. He was later banned for twelve months and fined £5,500.

=== Wrexham ===
On 21 July 2010, he appeared as a triallist for Wrexham during a 0–0 draw against a young Liverpool side in a pre-season friendly just 24 hours after his ban expired, later signing a one-year contract with the club. On his arrival, Wrexham manager Dean Saunders commented "We know what happened with him before, he's been out of football for a year, so I'm going to give him a chance". He made his debut on the opening day of the 2010–11 season in a 1–0 win over Cambridge United. His good form at the start of 2011 led to him being named the Blue Square Bet Premier player of the month for January. On 19 August Harris scored his first goal of the 2011–12 season against Lincoln City. Wrexham won the game 2–1 and went top of the Conference Premier. In January 2012 Harris signed a new deal to stay with Wrexham until the end of the 2012–13 season. Harris and Wrexham failed to gain promotion from the Conference but Harris remained at Wrexham ahead of the new season. Harris scored some major goals in the 2012/2013 season and on 25 February 2013 Harris signed an extension on his contract to run until the summer of 2015. Harris picked up his first piece of silverware in his career when he won the FA Trophy with Wrexham in March 2013.

=== Tranmere Rovers ===
Harris signed for Tranmere Rovers on 22 May 2015 on a free transfer after his contract with Wrexham expired. On 27 June 2019, Harris left the club after helping achieve back to back promotions with The Whites and being a very popular figure with fans.

=== Macclesfield Town ===
On 1 August 2019, Harris joined League Two side Macclesfield Town on a one-year deal.

=== Return to Wrexham ===
On 31 January 2020, Harris returned to Wrexham on an 18-month contract.

On 2 June 2021, it was announced Harris would not be offered a contract extension by Wrexham.

=== Warrington Town ===
On 29 August 2021, Harris signed for Warrington Town.

== Career statistics ==
As of match played 23 December 2023

Appearances and goals by club, season and competition
Club	Season	League			FA Cup		League Cup		Other		Total	
Club	Season	Division	Apps	Goals	Apps	Goals	Apps	Goals	Apps	Goals	Apps	Goals
Everton	2005–06	Premier League	0	0	0	0	0	0	0	0	0	0
Accrington Stanley	2006–07	League Two	32	2	1	0	1	0	2 (Note: Appearances in Football League Trophy)	0	36	2
Accrington Stanley	2007–08	League Two	41	0	1	0	1	0	0	0	43	0
Accrington Stanley	Total		73	2	2	0	2	0	2	0	79	2
Chester City	2008–09	League Two	31	0	1	0	1	0	0	0	33	0
Wrexham	2010–11	Conference Premier	40	4	1	0	—		3 (Note: Two appearances in Conference Premier play-offs, one in FA Trophy)	1	44	5
Wrexham	2011–12	Conference Premier	38	3	5	0	—		2 (Note: Appearances in Conference Premier play-offs)	0	45	3
Wrexham	2012–13	Conference Premier	37	4	2	0	—		8 (Note: Three appearances in Conference Premier play-offs, five appearances and one goal in FA Trophy)	1	47	5
Wrexham	2013–14	Conference Premier	36	2	3	1	—		1 (Note: Appearances in FA Trophy)	0	40	3
Wrexham	2014–15	Conference Premier	30	3	4	0	—		9	1	43	4
Wrexham	Total		181	16	15	1	—		23	3	219	20
Tranmere Rovers	2015–16	National League	41	3	2	0	—		0	0	43	3
Tranmere Rovers	2016–17	National League	31	4	1	0	—		4	0	36	4
Tranmere Rovers	2017–18	National League	34	0	1	0	—		1	0	36	0
Tranmere Rovers	2018–19	League Two	21	1	5	0	1	0	6 (Note: Three appearances in EFL Trophy and one goal, three in EFL League Two play-offs)	1	33	2
Tranmere Rovers	Total		127	8	9	0	1	0	11	1	148	9
Macclesfield Town	2019–20	League Two	25	1	0	0	2	0	1 (Note: Appearances in EFL Trophy)	0	28	1
Wrexham	2019–20	National League	5	0	—		—		—		5	0
Wrexham	2020–21	National League	32	1	1	0	—		0	0	33	1
Wrexham	Total		37	1	1	0	—		0	0	38	1
Warrington Town	2021–22	NPL Premier Division	31	2	1	0	—		4 (Note: Two appearances in NPL Premier Division play-offs, two in FA Trophy)	0	36	2
Warrington Town	2022–23	NPL Premier Division	34	4	2	0	—		4 (Note: One appearance in NPL Premier Division play-offs, three in FA Trophy)	0	40	4
Warrington Town	2023–24	National League North	5	1	0	0	—		0	0	5	1
Warrington Town	Total		70	7	3	0	—		8	0	81	7
Career totals			526	35	31	1	6	0	45	4	613	40

== Honours ==
Wrexham

- FA Trophy: 2012–13; runner-up: 2014–15

Tranmere Rovers

- EFL League Two play-offs: 2019
- National League play-offs: 2018

Individual

- Conference Premier Team of the Year: 2012–13
