= Shaquille McDonald =

English footballer (born 1995)

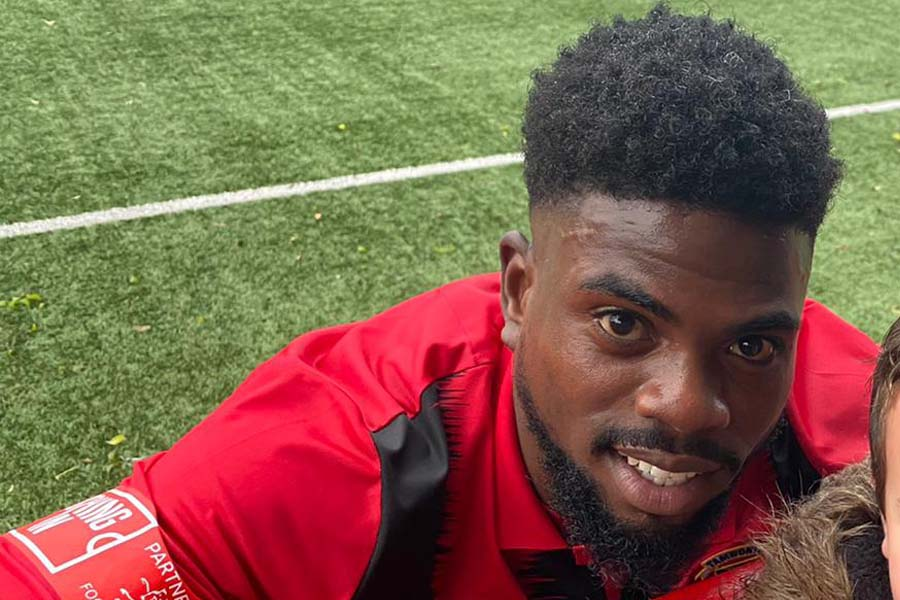
- McDonald in 2020

Personal information
- Full name: Shaquille Alphonso McDonald
- Date of birth: 19 July 1995 (age 31)
- Place of birth: Birmingham, England
- Height: 5 ft 8 in (1.73 m)
- Position: Forward

Youth career
- 2011–2012: Birmingham City
- 2012: Chasetown
- 2012: Alsager Town
- 2012–2013: Peterborough United

Senior career*
Years	Team	Apps	(Gls)
2013	Peterborough United	0	(0)
2013	→ Chester (loan)	1	(0)
2013	→ Histon (loan)	3	(2)
2014	York City	0	(0)
2014–2016	Derby County	0	(0)
2015	→ Cheltenham Town (loan)	4	(0)
2015–2016	→ FC Halifax Town (loan)	15	(2)
2016–2017	Nuneaton Town	12	(1)
2017	Sutton Coldfield Town	2	(0)
2017	Black Country Rangers	17	(24)
2017–2018	Coventry United	28	(17)
2018–2019	Mickleover Sports	18	(6)
2019–2020	Bromsgrove Sporting	26	(13)
2020–2022	Tamworth	18	(5)
2022	Mickleover	10	(2)
2025–	Wolverhampton Sporting	2	(1)
- * Club domestic league appearances and goals as of 21:15, 8 December 2025 (UTC)

Shaquille Alphonso McDonald (born 19 July 1995) is a British footballer who plays as a forward.

He played four League Two games for Cheltenham Town on loan in 2015, while also signing for Football League sides Peterborough United, York City and Derby County without making a first-team appearance. He spent most of his career in non-league football.

== Playing career ==
=== Early career ===
Born in Birmingham, West Midlands, McDonald was with Birmingham City's youth system from 2011 to 2012. He joined Chasetown's scholarship scheme in July 2012, before joining Championship club Peterborough United five months later after impressing on trial.

=== Peterborough United ===
McDonald signed a four-year professional contract with Peterborough United on 5 April 2013. On 13 September 2013, McDonald joined Conference Premier club Chester on loan until January 2014. On his debut a day later, he was sent off for violent conduct in a 3–1 away defeat to Salisbury City. It would be the only appearance he made for the club. He returned to Peterborough before being loaned out to Conference North club Histon on 18 October 2013. He was released by Peterborough on 15 November 2013 by mutual consent.

=== York City ===
Having been on trial with League Two club York City in December 2013, McDonald joined on 1 January 2014. He was released at the end of the 2013–14 season without playing.

=== Derby County ===
McDonald signed for Championship club Derby County on 1 August 2014 on a two-year contract after a successful trial. On 26 March 2015, he joined Cheltenham Town on loan, making his debut two days later in a 3–0 home defeat to Plymouth Argyle.

On 27 November 2015, McDonald joined National League club FC Halifax Town on a youth loan until 2 January 2016. He made his debut on 15 December 2015 in a 5–0 home win over Tamworth in the FA Trophy, scoring from the rebound after Nicky Wroe's shot was blocked. He scored 4 goals from 19 appearances for FC Halifax, and was on the bench as they beat Grimsby Town at Wembley Stadium in the 2016 FA Trophy Final. He was released by Derby at the end of 2015–16.

=== Nuneaton Town ===
McDonald signed for National League North club Nuneaton Town on 11 June 2016 on a one-year contract. He left the club during the January transfer window. He made 12 appearances and scored one goal.

=== Black Country Rangers ===
McDonald signed for West Midlands (Regional) League team Black Country Rangers in August 2017. He made 17 appearances and scored 24 goals.

=== Coventry United ===
McDonald signed for Midlands Football League side Coventry United in December 2017 for the second half of the 2017–18 season. That year he scored 16 goals in 14 games for the Midlands club.

=== Mickleover Sports ===
In December 2018, McDonald signed for Northern Premier League club Mickleover Sports. McDonald ended the season as top scorer for the club and saved the club from relegation in the final 15 minutes of the game by scoring one and assisting the other to keep them in the division.

=== Bromsgrove Sporting ===
On 11 June 2019 McDonald signed for Southern League Premier Division Central side Bromsgrove Sporting. He made his debut on the opening day of the league season on 10 August, in a 1-1 draw at home to Biggleswade Town. He scored in the following game as Bromsgrove Sporting came from behind to beat Tamworth 3-1 away from home on 13 August.

McDonald was prolific for Bromsgrove Sporting throughout the 2019-20 season, scoring a brace at home to Barwell in a FA Trophy fixture on 29 October 2019, however were defeated 7-2, and crashed out of the competition. He also bagged a brace away at Needham Market on the 14 December, which Bromsgrove Sporting won 3-0. He scored a hat-trick on 8 February 2020 in a 6-0 demolition at home to Lowestoft Town.

McDonald finished the season with a Southern League Premier Division ratio of a goal in every two matches. In total he made 26 appearances and scoring 13 goals, coupled with six appearances, scoring five goals in the cup competitions. McDonald confirmed via social media on 27 June 2020 that he would be leaving the club following the expiry of his contract.

=== Tamworth ===
McDonald was confirmed as joining fellow Southern League Premier Division Central side Tamworth on 1 July 2020. He made his debut on 19 September in a 1–1 away draw at Peterborough Sports on the opening day of the season.

McDonald committed to Tamworth for a second season on 31 May 2021. He played the clubs first game of the 2021–22 season on the 14 August away at Royston Town, and was replaced on the 57th minute by Dexter Walters following an injury.

McDonald returned to first team action on 23 October 2021, in a Southern League Premier Division Central home fixture against Leiston. He began the match as a substitute, but with Tamworth tailing 2-0 at half time, he was introduced for the second half in place of Michael Tait, and scored in a 3-1 defeat.

=== Mickleover ===
On 17 January 2022, McDonald was announced as signing for Northern Premier League Premier Division club Mickleover.

== Personal life ==
=== Domestic abuse and conviction for assault ===
In March 2023, McDonald beat and strangled his girlfriend at her home. She escaped by jumping 14 feet from a third-storey window, suffering further injuries. In October that year, he admitted to assault occasioning actual bodily harm at Birmingham Crown Court and was sentenced to two years and eight months in prison.

== Career statistics ==
=== Club ===
As of match played 2 December 2025

Appearances and goals by club, season and competition
Club	Season	League			FA Cup		League Cup		Other		Total	
Club	Season	Division	Apps	Goals	Apps	Goals	Apps	Goals	Apps	Goals	Apps	Goals
Peterborough United	2012–13	Championship	0	0	0	0	0	0	0	0	0	0
Peterborough United	2013–14	League One	0	0	0	0	0	0	0	0	0	0
Peterborough United	Total		0	0	0	0	0	0	0	0	0	0
Chester (loan)	2013–14	Conference Premier	1	0	0	0	—		0	0	1	0
Histon (loan)	2013–14	Conference North	3	2	0	0	—		0	0	3	2
York City	2013–14	League Two	0	0	0	0	0	0	0	0	0	0
Derby County	2014–15	Championship	0	0	0	0	0	0	0	0	0	0
Derby County	2015–16	Championship	0	0	0	0	0	0	0	0	0	0
Derby County	Total		0	0	0	0	0	0	0	0	0	0
Cheltenham Town (loan)	2014–15	League Two	4	0	0	0	0	0	0	0	4	0
FC Halifax Town (loan)	2015–16	National League	15	2	0	0	—		4 (Note: Appearance(s) in FA Trophy)	2	19	4
Nuneaton Town	2016–17	National League North	12	1	1	0	—		1 (Note: Appearance(s) in Birmingham Senior Cup)	0	14	1
Sutton Coldfield Town	2016–17	NPL Premier Division	2	0	—		0	0	0	0	2	0
Black Country Rangers	2017–18	West Midlands (Regional) League Premier Division	17	24	—		—		0	0	17	24
Coventry United	2017–18	MFL Premier Division	13	13	0	0	0	0	0	0	13	13
Coventry United	2018–19	MFL Premier Division	15	4	1	0	1	0	6 (Note: Five appearances and four goals in FA Vase, one appearance and two goals in Birmingham Senior Cup)	6	23	10
Coventry United	Total		28	17	1	0	1	0	6	6	36	23
Mickleover Sports	2018–19	NPL Premier Division	18	6	—		0	0	2 (Note: Appearance(s) in Derbyshire Senior Cup)	2	20	8
Bromsgrove Sporting	2019–20	SFL Premier Division Central	26	13	2	1	2	1	2 (Note: One appearance and two goals in FA Trophy, one appearance and one goal in Worcestershire Senior Cup)	3	32	18
Tamworth	2020–21	SFL Premier Division Central	7	4	2	1	—		2	2	11	7
Tamworth	2021–22	SFL Premier Division Central	11	1	0	0	—		2	2	13	3
Tamworth	Total		18	5	2	1	—		4	4	24	10
Mickleover	2021–22	NPL Premier Division	10	2	0	0	0	0	0	0	10	2
Wolverhampton Sporting	2025–26	NWCL Division One South	2	1	0	0	0	0	0	0	2	1
Career total			156	73	6	2	3	1	19	17	184	93
