= Michael Tait (footballer) =

English association football player

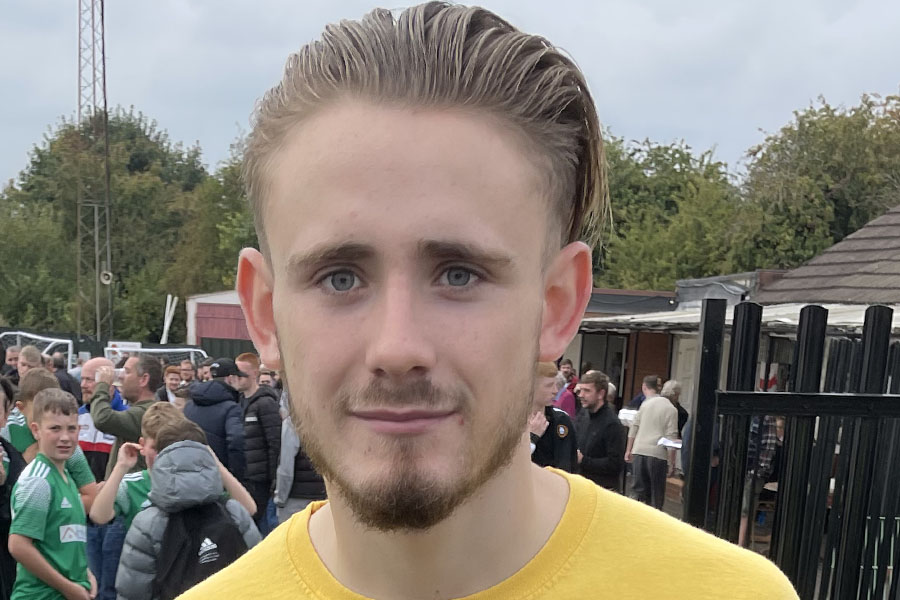
- Tait in October 2021

Personal information
- Full name: Michael Tait Moran
- Date of birth: 29 January 2001 (age 25)
- Place of birth: Birmingham, England
- Height: 1.77 m (5 ft 9 1/2 in)
- Position: Forward

Team information
- Current team: Walsall Wood

Youth career
- 2008–2019: Aston Villa

Senior career*
Years	Team	Apps	(Gls)
2019–2021	Aston Villa	0	(0)
2021–2022	Tamworth	2	(0)
2021–2022	→ Stafford Rangers (loan)	12	(2)
2022–2023	Stafford Rangers		
2023	Boldmere St. Michaels	12	(3)
2023–	Walsall Wood		
- * Club domestic league appearances and goals as of 22:00, 3 May 2022 (UTC)

Michael Tait Moran (born 29 January 2001) is an English footballer who plays for Midland League Division Three club Walsall Wood. He plays as a forward. Tait is a product of the Aston Villa Academy.

== Club career ==
=== Aston Villa ===
Tait started training with Aston Villa at the age of seven and progressed through their academy sides, he signed his first professional contract in September 2019 aged 17, a two-year deal following a strong start to the season where he scored seven goals at youth level.

On 3 September 2019, Tait made his professional debut for Aston Villa in the 2019-20 EFL Trophy, starting in a 2-0 away defeat at Salford City. Tait was named on the bench on 8 January 2021 in an FA Cup third-round tie against Liverpool, but did not feature in the match. He was released from Aston Villa in 2021.

=== Tamworth ===
On 7 September 2021, Tait was announced as a signing for Southern League Premier Division Central side Tamworth. On the same night Tait made his debut in a Southern League Cup fixture at home to Coalville Town, playing the full match in a 3-1 defeat.

Tait made a late cameo in the FA Cup 2nd qualifying round 5-0 away demolition of Belper Town on 18 September 2021, with the attacking player coming on as a 76th minute substitute for defender Lucas Yeomans, and even scored his first goal for the club on the 81st minute to complete the rout. He also made a substitute appearance in the next round on 2 October 2021, as Tamworth defeated Leiston 3-1 away from home, Michael came on as a 65th minute substitute for Dexter Walters in the match.

His long-awaited Southern League Premier Division Central debut came on 23 October 2021, starting in a home fixture against Leiston. Tamworth found themselves 2-0 down at half time, and Tait was substituted at the beginning of the second half for the returning Shaquille McDonald, who went on to score Tamworth's only goal in the game in a disappointing 3-1 home defeat.

=== Stafford Rangers (loan) ===
On 18 November 2021, Tait signed for Northern Premier League Premier Division side Stafford Rangers on a loan deal until 17 January 2022.

=== Walsall Wood F.C. ===
In October 2023, Tait joined Walsall Wood.

== Career statistics ==
As of match played 3 May 2022

Appearances and goals by club, season, and competition
Club	Season	League			FA Cup		EFL Cup		Other		Total	
Club	Season	Division	Apps	Goals	Apps	Goals	Apps	Goals	Apps	Goals	Apps	Goals
Aston Villa	2019–20	Premier League	0	0	0	0	0	0	2 (Note: Appearances in EFL Trophy)	0	2	0
Aston Villa	2020–21	Premier League	0	0	0	0	0	0	0	0	0	0
Tamworth	2021–22	Southern League Premier Division Central	2	0	2	1	—		3 (Note: One appearance in Southern League Cup) (Note: One appearance in the FA Trophy) (Note: One appearance in Birmingham Senior Cup)	0	7	1
Tamworth (loan)	2021–22	Northern Premier League Premier Division	12	2	0	0	—		2 (Note: Two appearances in Staffordshire Senior Cup)	0	14	2
Career total			14	2	2	1	0	0	7	0	23	3
