= John Mills (footballer, born 1990) =

English footballer (born 1990)

Personal information
- Date of birth: 20 March 1990 (age 36)
- Place of birth: Oxford, England
- Height: 5 ft 11 in (1.80 m)
- Position: Striker

Team information
- Current team: Milton United (player-manager)

Senior career*
Years	Team	Apps	(Gls)
2006–2011	Abingdon United		
2011–2013	North Leigh		
2013–2015	Didcot Town		
2015–2018	Hereford		
2018–2019	Bath City		
2018–2019	→ Banbury United (loan)		
2019	→ Westfields (loan)		
2019–2020	Banbury United		
2020	Thatcham Town		
2020–2021	North Leigh		
2021	Kidlington		
2021–2022	Royal Wootton Bassett Town		
2022–2025	Abingdon United		
2025	→ Newbury Town (dual reg.)		
2025–	Milton United	8	(2)

Managerial career
- 2023–2025: Abingdon United
- 2025–: Milton United
- * Club domestic league appearances and goals as of 14:29, 3 December 2025 (UTC)

John Mills (born 20 March 1990) is an English semi-professional footballer who plays as a striker for Oxfordshire Senior League Premier Division club Milton United, where he is also interim manager.

== Career ==
A prolific goalscorer at non-league level, Mills scored on his senior debut for Abingdon United in November 2007, aged 17.

Mills later featured for Woodstock Town. In 2011, Mills signed for North Leigh, spending two seasons with the Southern League Division One South & West club and scoring 39 goals in 90 appearances. He helped North Leigh win the Oxfordshire Senior Cup in 2012, defeating Oxford City 5–0 in which Mills scored the fifth goal of the match. He won the club's golden boot award that season with 24 goals.

Mills then joined divisional rivals Didcot Town in September 2013. While at Didcot, Mills' goalscoring exploits were recognised by being awarded the All About Ballerz Golden Boot at the Non-League Paper's National Game Awards for scoring 57 goals in all competitions.

On 24 July 2015, Mills joined newly-formed Midland League Premier Division club Hereford. Mills was previously subject to an approach from Hereford's predecessor club Hereford United before they folded, who were at the time playing in a higher division. Mills scored 52 goals in 53 games, also appearing in the FA Vase final at Wembley in his debut season at Hereford. On 7 June 2018, it was announced that Mills would leave Hereford after three seasons, each of which he was the club's top goalscorer.

Upon leaving Hereford, on 19 June 2018, Mills joined National League South club Bath City.

On 11 October 2018, Mills joined Southern League Premier Division Central club Banbury United on loan until January. After his loan spell at Banbury ended, on 4 January 2019, Mills dropped down two leagues to join Midland League Premier Division club Westfields on loan.

On 2 July 2019, Mills returned to Banbury United for a second spell. He was released by Banbury on 6 February 2020, having scored 9 goals in 48 appearances across his two spells with the club.

On 14 February 2020, Mills signed for Southern Football League Division One South club Thatcham Town.

On 19 August 2020, Mills returned to former club North Leigh in the Southern Football League Division One Central, for a second time.

On 12 August 2021, Mills joined Southern League Premier Division Central club Kidlington. However, his spell at the club did not last long as the following month Mills signed for Royal Wootton Bassett Town in the Hellenic League Premier Division, scoring 16 goals in all competitions and winning the Supporters' Player of the Year award.

On 9 July 2022, Mills returned to Hellenic League Division One and former club Abingdon United as player-coach. On 14 January 2023, Mills took temporary charge of the first team. On 4 March 2023, it was announced that Mills would remain as manager until the end of the season. On 12 May 2023, Mills was appointed as Abingdon United manager on a permanent basis.

On 3 September 2025, Mills was relieved of his duties as player-manager of Abingdon. One week later, Thames Valley Premier League Premier Division club Newbury Town announced on social media that Mills had joined them on dual registration terms. Just two days later however, he signed for Combined Counties League Premier Division North club Milton United.
