= Jason St Juste =

English footballer

Personal information
- Full name: Jason Valentine St Juste
- Date of birth: 21 September 1985 (age 41)
- Place of birth: Leeds, England
- Position: Left wing

Team information
- Current team: Selby Town

Senior career*
Years	Team	Apps	(Gls)
2003–2004	Garforth Town	?	(?)
2004–2005	Darlington	15	(2)
2005–2006	Southampton	0	(0)
2006–2009	Garforth Town		
2009–2010	Sandnes Ulf	18	(3)
2010–2011	Garforth Town	1	(0)
2011	→ Chester (loan)	2	(0)
2011–2013	FC Halifax Town	47	(2)
2013–2014	Bradford Park Avenue	12	(0)
2014	Whitehawk	1	(0)
2014	Farsley	4	(1)
2014–2015	North Ferriby United	28	(6)
2015	AFC Fylde	4	(0)
2015–2016	Bradford Park Avenue	27	(2)
2016–2017	Boston United	21	(1)
2017	FC United of Manchester	1	(0)
2017	Trafford	8	(0)
2017–2018	Ossett Town		
2018–2020	Yorkshire Amateur		
2020–2022	AFC Emley		
2022–2023	Thackley		
2023–	Selby Town	15	(0)

International career^{‡}
2014–	Saint Kitts and Nevis	15	(0)
- * Club domestic league appearances and goals as of 14:00, 13 December 2023 (UTC) ‡ National team caps and goals as of 14:00, 13 December 2023 (UTC)

Jason Valentine St Juste (born 21 September 1985 in Leeds) is a Kittitian footballer who plays for Selby Town. He previously played in the Football League for Darlington.

== Playing career ==
St Juste started his career under the guidance of Simon Clifford at Garforth Town. He became a graduate of the Leeds Brazilian Soccer School's program and was spotted by Football League Two side Darlington, joining them early in the 2004–05 season.

He made his Darlington debut in November 2004, playing as a substitute for Adrian Webster in the 2–0 win away to Cheltenham Town. He made his second appearance for Darlington on 3 January 2005 as he played the full 90 minutes and helped the team to a 3–1 win over Macclesfield Town.

On 19 March 2005 St Juste made his seventh appearance for Darlington in an away match against Grimsby Town, scoring his first goal for the club. St Juste hit headlines by scooping a hat-trick of awards. He walked away with the young player of the season and both goal of the season awards for his goals against Grimsby Town and Bristol Rovers.

He was out of contract at the end of the 2004–05 season and was linked with Southampton who initially insisted that they did not want to sign him. However, he eventually signed for Southampton on a short-term contract in September 2005 following Simon Clifford's appointment as a coach at the club.

He failed to appear for Southampton and rejoined Garforth Town in November 2006. He left Garforth to join Sandnes Ulf in 2009.

In February 2011 St Juste signed on loan for non-league 'phoenix club' Chester F.C. until the end of the season but his loan was cancelled at the end of March after he failed to make an impact whilst on loan.

He later joined FC Halifax Town in September 2011. Despite coming on from the bench in most games, Jason was able to score in two games for the Shaymen, at home to Blyth Spartans and away at Corby Town. In the 2012–13 season, St Juste started more games due to a groin injury to Scott McManus, but this meant playing in an unfamiliar left back position. St Juste had a very strong start to the season, including a goal against Chelmsford City in the FA Trophy Third Round, but a hernia meant that he would spend a month on the sidelines.

He joined Bradford Park Avenue A.F.C. on 5 September 2015.

In summer 2016 he joined Boston United. In summer 2017, he joined FC United of Manchester.

In September 2017 he moved to Trafford on dual registration terms.

== International career ==
In August 2014, St Juste was called up to represent Saint Kitts and Nevis for the first time during 2014 Caribbean Cup qualification.

== Career statistics ==
=== International ===
As of match played 7 June 2017

Appearances and goals by national team and year
National team	Year	Apps	Goals
Saint Kitts and Nevis	2014	3	0
Saint Kitts and Nevis	2015	4	0
Saint Kitts and Nevis	2016	6	0
Saint Kitts and Nevis	2017	2	0
Total		15	0

== Honours ==
North Ferriby United

- FA Trophy: 2014–15
