= 2012–13 FA Trophy =

FA Challenge Trophy

Tournament details
- Country: England; Wales
- Teams: 266

Final positions
- Champions: Wrexham
- Runners-up: Grimsby Town

The 2012–13 FA Trophy was the 43rd season of the FA Trophy, the Football Association's cup competition for teams at levels 5–8 of the English football league system. A total of 266 clubs entered the competition. This season's competition was only the third time that the Trophy Holders, in this case York City F.C., were ineligible to defend it due to promotion to the English Football League Two.

The competition was won by Wrexham for the first time, who defeated Grimsby Town 4–1 on penalties, after being held 1–1 in normal time.

== Calendar ==
Round	Date	Matches	Clubs	New entries this round	Prize money
Preliminary round	15 September 2012	54	266 → 212	108	£2,300
First round qualifying	29 September 2012	72	212 → 140	90	£2,550
Second round qualifying	27 October 2012	36	140 → 104	none	£3,250
Third round qualifying	10 November 2012	40	104 → 64	44	£4,000
First round	24 November 2012	32	64 → 32	24	£5,000
Second round	15 December 2012	16	32 → 16	none	£6,000
Third round	12 January 2013	8	16 → 8	none	£7,000
Quarter-finals	26 January 2013	4	8 → 4	none	£8,000
Semi-finals	16 February and 23 February 2013	2	4 → 2	none	£16,000
Final	24 March 2013	1	2 → 1	none	Runner-up £25,000 Winner £50,000

== Preliminary round ==
Ties will be played on 15 September 2012.

=== Ties ===
Tie no	Home team	Score	Away team	Attendance
1	New Mills	1–0	Ossett Albion	144
2	Lancaster City	1–2	Wakefield	119
3	Northwich Victoria	1–1	Clitheroe	65
4	Harrogate Railway Athletic	2–1	Bamber Bridge	62
5	Warrington Town	1–2	Leek Town	172
6	Farsley	1–1	Radcliffe Borough	138
7	Brigg Town	0–1	Ramsbottom United	105
8	Garforth Town	1–2	Burscough	70
9	Trafford	2–0	Sheffield	143
10	Goole	1–1	Curzon Ashton	135
11	Skelmersdale United	4–2	Salford City	133
12	Loughborough Dynamo	3–4	Belper Town	110
13	Carlton Town	0–2	Newcastle Town	46
14	Sutton Coldfield Town	0–1	Gresley	110
15	Stamford	1–0	Evesham United	152
16	Mickleover Sports	0–3	Romulus	131
17	Rainworth Miners Welfare	3–0	Leighton Town	86
18	Biggleswade Town	2–2	Halesowen Town	100
19	Hucknall Town	2–1	Market Drayton Town	95
20	Kidsgrove Athletic	4–1	Daventry Town	117
21	Brentwood Town	0–0	Harlow Town	137
22	Grays Athletic	2–1	Aylesbury	113
23	Walton & Hersham	3–2	Maldon & Tiptree	75
24	Hythe Town	4–0	Ware	165
25	Thamesmead Town	1–1	Burgess Hill Town	28
26	Royston Town	5–1	Aveley	136
27	Wroxham	3–1	AFC Hayes	82
28	Corinthian Casuals	1–2	Potters Bar Town	59
29	Romford	3–1	Dulwich Hamlet	97
30	Folkestone Invicta	0–0	Merstham	173
31	Northwood	0–4	Leatherhead	108
32	Needham Market	3–4	Maidstone United	290
33	Heybridge Swifts	4–1	Worthing	95
34	Cheshunt	1–3	Waltham Forest	65
35	Sittingbourne	4–0	Horsham	155
36	Chipstead	0–1	Waltham Abbey	51
37	Walton Casuals	1–5	Ashford Town (Middx)	69
38	Chertsey Town	4–1	Tilbury	116
39	Faversham Town	1–0	AFC Sudbury	137
40	Herne Bay	0–2	Chatham Town	258
41	Crawley Down Gatwick	2–1	Witham Town	67
42	North Greenford United	1–3	Tooting & Mitcham United	67
43	Clevedon Town	2–2	Wimborne Town	112
44	Merthyr Town	1–1	Fleet Town	303
45	Winchester City	1–2	Sholing	62
46	Thatcham Town	0–1	Tiverton Town	86
47	Godalming Town	0–1	North Leigh	158
48	Abingdon United	2–4	Bridgwater Town	63
49	Slough Town	2–1	Hungerford Town	228
50	Cirencester Town	2–3	Guildford City	78
51	Didcot Town	0–0	Paulton Rovers	115
52	Beaconsfield SYCOB	0–0	Poole Town	108
53	Swindon Supermarine	0–0	Yate Town	104
54	Mangotsfield United	0–0	Shortwood United	116

† – After extra time

=== Ties ===
Tie no	Home team	Score	Away team	Attendance
3	Clitheroe	0–3	Northwich Victoria	151
6	Radcliffe Borough	1–0	Farsley	74
10	Curzon Ashton	3–3 †	Goole	126
Curzon Ashton advance 4–3 on penalties.
18	Halesowen Town	4-1	Biggleswade Town	115
21	Harlow Town	0–4	Brentwood Town	93
25	Burgess Hill Town	0–2	Thamesmead Town	81
30	Merstham	2–0	Folkestone Invicta	95
43	Wimborne Town	3–0	Clevedon Town	94
44	Fleet Town	0–4	Merthyr Town	95
51	Paulton Rovers	2–3	Didcot Town	101
52	Poole Town	3–1	Beaconsfield SYCOB	202
53	Yate Town	0–3	Swindon Supermarine	81
54	Shortwood United	0–0 †	Mangotsfield United	98
Shortwood United advance 5–4 on penalties.

† – After extra time

== First round qualifying ==
Ties will be played on 29 September 2012

Teams from Premier Division of Southern League, Northern Premier League and Isthmian League entered in this round.

Tie no	Home team	Score	Away team	Attendance
1	Witton Albion	4–1	Blyth Spartans	313
2	AFC Fylde	1–0	Marine	317
3	Cammell Laird	1–1	Kendal Town	58
replay	Kendal Town	0–2	Cammell Laird	116
4	Ramsbottom United	4–2	Northwich Victoria	227
5	Leek Town	2–1	Radcliffe Borough	281
6	Frickley Athletic	1–4	North Ferriby United	146
7	Burscough	3–2	Wakefield	129
8	FC United of Manchester	3–3	Mossley	871
replay	Mossley	1–3	FC United of Manchester	405
9	Chorley	1-3	Whitby Town	338
10	Prescot Cables	0–3	Skelmersdale United	177
11	Harrogate Railway Athletic	2–4	Trafford	89
12	Lincoln United	0–4	Buxton	107
13	Curzon Ashton	2–3	Worksop Town	164
14	Ossett Town	1–0	Ashton United	88
15	New Mills	3–2	Stocksbridge Park Steels	155
16	Stourbridge	0–1	Ilkeston	349
17	Grantham Town	0–2	Bedford Town	271
18	King's Lynn Town	1–0	Barwell	466
19	Halesowen Town	3–0	Gresley	262
20	Romulus	2–0	Rainworth Miners Welfare	44
21	Hednesford Town	3–1	Bedworth United	307
22	Hucknall Town	2–1	Newcastle Town	175
23	Rushall Olympic	3–0	Woodford United	101
24	Nantwich Town	2–1	Redditch United	247
25	Barton Rovers	0–5	Coalville Town	87
26	Stamford	3–1	Kidsgrove Athletic	153
27	Eastwood Town	1–2	Matlock Town	186
28	Chasetown	3–2	St Neots Town	244
29	Rugby Town	1–1	Stafford Rangers	206
replay	Stafford Rangers	1–0 †	Rugby Town	232
30	Belper Town	2–2	Leamington	228
replay	Leamington	2–2 †	Belper Town	226
Belper Town advance 4–3 on penalties.
31	Soham Town Rangers	2–0	Tooting & Mitcham United	156
32	Enfield Town	4–1	Cambridge City	281
33	Crawley Down Gatwick	1–2	Three Bridges	182
34	Lewes	1–0	Lowestoft Town	407
35	Canvey Island	0–0	Wroxham	261
replay	Wroxham	1–2 †	Canvey Island	155
36	Chatham Town	2–4	Merstham	129
37	Faversham Town	0–2	Leatherhead	146
38	Ramsgate	4–0	Waltham Forest	127

Tie no	Home team	Score	Away team	Attendance
39	Whitstable Town	2–0	Harrow Borough	161
40	Wealdstone	3–1	Chertsey Town	254
41	East Thurrock United	4–0	Hastings United	143
42	Kettering Town	0–3	Concord Rangers	213
43	Burnham	4–3	Waltham Abbey	103
44	Thamesmead Town	0–1	Cray Wanderers	40
45	Grays Athletic	1–1	Ashford Town (Middlesex)	122
replay	Ashford Town (Middlesex)	1–2	Grays Athletic	86
46	Wingate & Finchley	2–1	Potters Bar Town	91
47	Margate	1-2	Maidstone United	475
48	Kingstonian	2–1	Eastbourne Town	279
49	Romford	1–3	Thurrock	139
50	Uxbridge	2–2	Royston Town	85
replay	Royston Town	1–3	Uxbridge	114
51	Bury Town	0–0	Whitehawk	301
replay	Whitehawk	1–0	Bury Town	50
52	Redbridge	0–5	Metropolitan Police	55
53	Carshalton Athletic	3–0	Heybridge Swifts	172
54	St Albans City	1–2	Arlesey Town	335
55	Walton & Hersham	1–2	Brentwood Town	79
56	Bognor Regis Town	4–1	Ilford	321
57	Hampton & Richmond Borough	1–1	Hythe Town	202
replay	Hythe Town	0–4	Hampton & Richmond Borough	151
58	Hitchin Town	3–1	Sittingbourne	198
59	Leiston	2–1	Hendon	186
60	Banbury United	1–1	Wimborne Town	146
replay	Wimborne Town	3–3 †	Banbury United	99
Wimborne Town advance 6–5 on penalties.
61	Didcot Town	3–1	Cinderford Town	118
62	Chippenham Town	4–0	Swindon Supermarine	280
63	Shortwood United	4–0	Guildford City	121
64	Bridgwater Town	2–2	Hemel Hempstead Town	113
replay	Hemel Hempstead Town	1–3	Bridgwater Town	93
65	Weymouth	3–0	Tiverton Town	402
66	AFC Totton	2–0	Bideford	288
67	Merthyr Town	1–0	Chalfont St Peter	241
68	Bishop's Cleeve	1–2	Chesham United	96
69	Slough Town	0–4	Gosport Borough	190
70	Poole Town	1–1	Bashley	351
replay	Bashley	0–4	Poole Town	171
71	Frome Town	0–1	Taunton Town	151
72	North Leigh	2–2	Sholing	64
replay	Sholing	4–3	North Leigh	35

† – After extra time

== Second round qualifying ==
Ties will be played on 27 October 2012

Tie no	Home team	Score	Away team	Attendance
1	Matlock Town	0–0	Leek Town	264
replay	Leek Town	1–3	Matlock Town	145
2	Witton Albion	2–3	Skelmersdale United	346
3	Romulus	1–0	Hucknall Town	49
4	Burscough	0–1	Ossett Town	140
5	Belper Town	0–2	Cammell Laird	203
6	AFC Fylde	0–0	Nantwich Town	261
replay	Nantwich Town	2–2	AFC Fylde	181
AFC Fylde advance 3–1 on penalties.
7	Buxton	2–1	North Ferriby United	215
8	Chasetown	1–3	Rushall Olympic	286
9	Trafford	0–2	Hednesford Town	188
10	New Mills	5–2	Coalville Town	203
11	Stafford Rangers	3–0	Ramsbottom United	341
12	Stamford	2–1	FC United of Manchester	749
13	Whitby Town	4–2	Ilkeston	272
14	Halesowen Town	0–1	Worksop Town	265
15	Soham Town Rangers	1–2	Ramsgate	131
16	Cray Wanderers	0–0	Arlesey Town	96
replay	Arlesey Town	2–3	Cray Wanderers	100
17	Kingstonian	2–1	Burnham	261
18	Leiston	1–1	Metropolitan Police	153
replay	Metropolitan Police	3–4	Leiston	66

Tie no	Home team	Score	Away team	Attendance
19	Uxbridge	3–3	Canvey Island	152
replay	Canvey Island	4–2	Uxbridge	176
20	Whitstable Town	0–1	Leatherhead	222
21	Merstham	2–6	Wealdstone	245
22	Wingate & Finchley	2–2	Hitchin Town	101
replay	Hitchin Town	3–0	Wingate & Finchley	171
23	East Thurrock United	1–1	Thurrock	138
replay	Thurrock	4–3	East Thurrock United	145
24	Hampton & Richmond Borough	1–0	Three Bridges	229
25	Bedford Town	2–3	Maidstone United	402
26	Concord Rangers	0–2	Enfield Town	148
27	King's Lynn Town	6–1	Carshalton Athletic	497
28	Whitehawk	1–1	Grays Athletic	140
replay	Grays Athletic	0–1	Whitehawk	121
29	Brentwood Town	3–3	Lewes	118
replay	Lewes	0–3	Brentwood Town	335
30	Bognor Regis Town	3–0	Bridgwater Town	313
31	Poole Town	1–1	Didcot Town	257
replay	Didcot Town	2–0	Poole Town	141
32	Chesham United	5–1	Taunton Town	214
33	Wimborne Town	1–5	Merthyr Town	230
34	AFC Totton	3–2	Gosport Borough	349
35	Chippenham Town	1–2	Sholing	237
36	Weymouth	1–2	Shortwood United	366

† – After extra time

== Third round qualifying ==
Ties will be played on 10 November 2012. This round is the first in which Conference North and South teams join the competition.

Tie no	Home team	Score	Away team	Attendance
1	Matlock Town	2–1	Stalybridge Celtic	402
2	Guiseley	7–0	Whitby Town	506
3	Cammell Laird	0–1	FC Halifax Town	301
4	Gainsborough Trinity	1–1	Hinckley United	357
replay	Hinckley United	1–4	Gainsborough Trinity	181
5	Worcester City	0–3	Altrincham	785
6	Vauxhall Motors	1–3	Harrogate Town	212
7	Stamford	0–2	Buxton	239
8	Chester	2–2	Worksop Town	1,410
replay	Worksop Town	2–0	Chester	457
9	Skelmersdale United	3–1	New Mills	187
10	Stafford Rangers	3–1	Bradford Park Avenue	419
11	Solihull Moors	2–1	AFC Fylde	155
12	Droylsden	1–2	Rushall Olympic	211
13	Romulus	1–2	Hednesford Town	224
14	Boston United	3–1	Colwyn Bay	694
15	Ossett Town	2–1	Workington	158
16	Thurrock	0–2	Brackley Town	99
17	King's Lynn Town	3–0	Eastbourne Borough	661
18	Histon	1–2	Boreham Wood	167
19	Cray Wanderers	0–1	Welling United	262
20	Sutton United	2–0	Ramsgate	281
21	Canvey Island	1–1	Chesham United	275
replay	Chesham United	2–1	Canvey Island	241
22	Bromley	1–1	Staines Town	309
replay	Staines Town	0–2	Bromley	191

Tie no	Home team	Score	Away team	Attendance
23	Kingstonian	2–2	Brentwood Town	291
replay	Brentwood Town	1–4	Kingstonian	117
24	Maidstone United	3–2	Whitehawk	1,571
25	AFC Hornchurch	2–3	Bishop's Stortford	271
26	Wealdstone	1–1	Corby Town	405
replay	Corby Town	3–2	Wealdstone	280
27	Tonbridge Angels	2–1	Hitchin Town	530
28	Billericay Town	3–2	Enfield Town	417
29	Chelmsford City	1–1	Dover Athletic	570
replay	Dover Athletic	2–4	Chelmsford City	418
30	Leiston	1–1	Hampton & Richmond Borough	201
replay	Hampton & Richmond Borough	3–2	Leiston	190
31	Gloucester City	0–1	Maidenhead United	242
32	Sholing	0–1	Oxford City	68
33	AFC Totton	3–0	Basingstoke Town	368
34	Didcot Town	1–2	Dorchester Town	179
35	Eastleigh	1–4	Hayes & Yeading United	241
36	Farnborough	3–2	Truro City	326
37	Leatherhead	4–4	Bath City	287
replay	Bath City	2–0	Leatherhead	341
38	Shortwood United	1–1	Merthyr Town	130
replay	Merthyr Town	2–1	Shortwood United	193
39	Bognor Regis Town	1-4	Havant & Waterlooville	702
40	Salisbury City	3–0	Weston Super Mare	510

† – After extra time

== First round ==
Ties will be played on 24 November 2012. This round is the first in which Conference Premier teams join those from lower reaches of the National League System.

Tie no	Home team	Score	Away team	Attendance
1	Alfreton Town	1–3	Kidderminster Harriers	361
2	Hednesford Town	1–2	Solihull Moors	355
3	Gainsborough Trinity	2–0	Harrogate Town	386
4	Wrexham	5–0	Rushall Olympic	1,085
5	Tamworth	3–1	Lincoln City	726
6	Boston United	1–1	Skelmersdale United	710
replay	Skelmersdale United	2–1	Boston United	295
7	FC Halifax Town	5–2	Altrincham	885
8	Mansfield Town	1–1	Matlock Town	1,615
replay	Matlock Town	2–1	Mansfield Town	758
9	Stafford Rangers	0–4	Southport	531
10	Guiseley	3–1	Brackley Town	524
11	Worksop Town	0–1	King's Lynn Town	488
12	AFC Telford United	1–0	Nuneaton Town	737
13	Gateshead	2–0	Macclesfield Town	312
14	Hyde	1–1	Barrow	436
replay	Barrow	1–0	Hyde	728
15	Stockport County	6–0	Ossett Town	1,679
16	Grimsby Town	0–0	Buxton	1,389
replay	Buxton	0–1	Grimsby Town	444

Tie no	Home team	Score	Away team	Attendance
17	Woking	7–0	Farnborough	979
18	Oxford City	1–0	Bishop's Stortford	134
19	Kingstonian	0–4	Dartford	508
20	Welling United	2–0	Newport County	441
21	Ebbsfleet United	0–1	Hereford United	651
22	Dorchester Town	2–2	Luton Town	688
replay	Luton Town	3-1	Dorchester Town	897
23	Braintree Town	1-2	Havant & Waterlooville	192
24	Chesham United	2–1	Bath City	301
25	Corby Town	3–2	Hayes & Yeading United	322
26	Bromley	1–1	Boreham Wood	242
replay	Boreham Wood	0–2	Bromley	188
27	Billericay Town	0–3	Cambridge United	536
28	Merthyr Town	1–2	Tonbridge Angels	229
29	Maidenhead United	0–1	Sutton United	217
30	Forest Green Rovers	2–1	AFC Totton	523
31	Maidstone United	2–0	Salisbury City	1,365
32	Hampton & Richmond Borough	1–1	Chelmsford City	241
replay	Chelmsford City	3–2	Hampton & Richmond Borough	301

† – After extra time

== Second round ==
Ties will be played on 15 December 2012.

Tie no	Home team	Score	Away team	Attendance
1	Dartford	3–0	Tonbridge Angels	926
2	Stockport County	1–1	Southport	1,328
replay	Southport	3–1	Stockport County	540
3	Sutton United	1–0	Oxford City	347
4	King's Lynn Town	3–1	AFC Telford United	955
5	Bromley	1–0	Kidderminster Harriers	432
6	Forest Green Rovers	1–2	Gainsborough Trinity	496
7	Tamworth	1–1	Corby Town	683
replay	Corby Town	2–4	Tamworth	300
8	Cambridge United	0–1	Gateshead	1,019
9	Woking	0–1	Welling United	826
10	Wrexham	3–2	Solihull Moors	1,111
11	Chesham United	1–5	Barrow	470
12	FC Halifax Town	2–1	Maidstone United	747
13	Hereford United	0–3	Chelmsford City	1,124
14	Grimsby Town	4–0	Havant & Waterlooville	1,215
15	Skelmersdale United	2–0	Guiseley	310
16	Matlock Town	1–2	Luton Town	829

== Third round ==
Ties will be played on 12 January 2013.

Tie no	Home team	Score	Away team	Attendance
1	King's Lynn Town	0–2	Southport	1,498
2	Sutton United	0–5	Wrexham	775
3	Dartford	4–2	Bromley	1,305
4	Welling United	1–2	Grimsby Town	1,037
5	FC Halifax Town	3–0	Chelmsford City	1,137
6	Gateshead	2–3	Barrow	728
7	Gainsborough Trinity	2–1	Tamworth	496
8	Luton Town	2–0	Skelmersdale United	2,479

== Quarter-finals ==
Ties will be played on 26 January 2013.

Tie no	Home team	Score	Away team	Attendance
1	FC Halifax Town	1–1	Dartford	921
replay	Dartford	3–2	FC Halifax Town	805
2	Southport	1–3	Wrexham	1,473
3	Gainsborough Trinity	2–0	Barrow	785
4	Grimsby Town	3–0	Luton Town	2,791

== Semi-finals ==
=== First leg ===
16 February 2013
12:45

Wrexham	3–1	Gainsborough Trinity
Wright 19'; Cieslewicz 66'; Ashton 90+2'	Report	Stamp 27'

Racecourse Ground, Wrexham
Attendance: 3,409
Referee: Andy Madley

16 February 2013
15:00

Grimsby Town	3–0	Dartford
Disley 28', 85'; Cook 87'

Blundell Park, Cleethorpes
Attendance: 3,573
Referee: James Adcock

=== Second leg ===
23 February 2013
15:00

Gainsborough Trinity	2–1	Wrexham
Hawkridge 26'; Leary 79'		Wright 21'

The Northolme, Gainsborough
Attendance: 3,307
Referee: Darren Bond

Wrexham won 4–3 on aggregate.

23 February 2013
15:00

Dartford	0–0	Grimsby Town

Princes Park, Dartford
Attendance: 2,153
Referee: Lee Collins

Grimsby Town won 3–0 on aggregate.

== Final ==
24 March 2013
15:00

Grimsby Town	1–1 (a.e.t.)	Wrexham
Cook 70'	Report	Thornton 81' (pen.)
Penalties
Hatton (penalty missed); Brodie (penalty missed); Colbeck (penalty scored)	1–4	(penalty scored) Cieslewicz; (penalty scored) D. Wright; (penalty scored) Westwood; (penalty scored) Hunt

Wembley Stadium, London
Attendance: 35,266
Referee: Jonathan Moss
