= 2016 FA Vase final =

- Event: 2015–16 FA Vase
Hereford	Morpeth Town
1	4
- Date: 22 May 2016
- Venue: Wembley Stadium, London
- Referee: Stuart Attwell
- Attendance: 46,781

The 2015–16 FA Vase final was the 42nd final of the Football Association's cup competition for teams at levels 9–11 of the English football league system. The match was contested between Hereford F.C. of the Midland Football League Premier Division (level 9) and Morpeth Town AFC of the Northern Football League Division One (level 9). For the first time ever the final of the FA Trophy was played on the same day at the same venue. Both matches were televised in the UK on BT Sport.

Morpeth Town AFC won the game 4–1.

== Match ==
=== Details ===
22 May 2016
12:15 BST

Hereford	1–4	Morpeth Town
Purdie 2'	Report	Swailes 34'; Carr 47'; Taylor 59'; Bell 90'

Wembley Stadium, London
Attendance: 46,781
Referee: Stuart Attwell (Birmingham FA)

GK	1	(England) Martin Horsell
RB	2	(Australia) Jimmy Oates
CB	5	(Wales) Ryan Green
CB	14	(England) Jamie Willets	(substituted off) 70'
LB	3	(England) Joel Edwards (c)
RM	17	(Ghana) Sirdic Grant
CM	4	(England) Rob Purdie
CM	8	(England) Aaron Birch
LM	16	(England) Joe Tumelty	(substituted off) 55'
CF	10	(England) Pablo Haysham
CF	11	(England) Mike Symons
Substitutes:
DF	6	(England) Nathan Summers
MF	7	(Sierra Leone) Mustapha Bundu	(substituted on) 55'
FW	9	(England) John Mills	(substituted on) 70'
MF	12	(England) Dylan Bonella
MF	18	(England) Ross Staley
Manager: (England) Peter Beadle

GK	1	(England) Karl Dryden
DF	2	(England) Stephen Forster
DF	3	(England) James Novak
MF	4	(England) Ben Sayer
DF	5	(England) Chris Swailes
DF	6	(England) Michael Hall
MF	7	(England) Sean Taylor	(substituted off) 79'
MF	8	(Republic of Ireland) Keith Graydon (c)
FW	9	(England) Luke Carr	(substituted off) 89'
FW	10	(England) Michael Chilton	(substituted off) 69'
MF	16	(England) Jordan Fry
Substitutes:
MF	14	(England) Shaun Bell	(substituted on) 89'
FW	15	(England) Steven Anderson Jr.	(substituted on) 69'
GK	19	(England) Niall Harrison
FW	20	(England) Dale Pearson
DF	25	(England) Damien Mullen	(substituted on) 79'
Manager: (England) Nick Gray and Dave Malone

Man of the match

- Chris Swailes

Match officials

- Assistant referees:
  - Antony Coggins (Oxfordshire FA)
  - James Mainwaring (Lancashire FA)
- Fourth official:Peter Bankes (Liverpool FA)

Match rules

- 90 minutes.
- 30 minutes of extra-time if necessary.
- Penalty shoot-out if scores still level.
- Five named substitutes.
- Maximum of three substitutions.
