= Scott McManus =

English footballer

Personal information
- Full name: Scott Harrison McManus
- Date of birth: 28 May 1989 (age 37)
- Place of birth: Prestwich, England
- Positions: Left-back; left midfielder

Team information
- Current team: Barwell

Youth career
- Manchester United

Senior career*
Years	Team	Apps	(Gls)
2005–2008	Prestwich Heys	65	(6)
2008	Curzon Ashton		
2008–2010	Crewe Alexandra	6	(1)
2010–2011	FC United of Manchester	38	(1)
2011–2018	Halifax Town	250	(12)
2018–2020	Coalville Town	49	(4)
2021–2024	Nuneaton Borough	92	(6)
2024	Coalville Town	16	(3)
2024–	Barwell	0	(0)
- * Club domestic league appearances and goals as of 12:58, 24 May 2024 (UTC)

Scott Harrison McManus (born 28 May 1989) is an English footballer who plays as a left-back for Northern Premier League Division One Midlands club Barwell.

== Career ==
=== Prestwich Heys ===
McManus was on the books at Manchester United as an apprentice for four or five years but was not handed a contract and left the club at the age of 15. After leaving United, he played for his local side Prestwich Heys notching up over 60 appearances.

=== Curzon Ashton ===
In the summer of 2008 he was picked up by Curzon Ashton. In a pre-season friendly against Nottingham Forest he impressed the opposition enough to receive a trial and during that time was spotted by Crewe Alexandra scout Steve Holland.

=== Crewe Alexandra ===
When offered contracts by both Forest and Crewe, he elected to sign on at Gresty Road.

He spent most of the 2008–09 season playing for the reserve side, but made his debut under new manager Gudjon Thordarson towards the end of the season. He scored his first goal for Crewe in their 4–3 away defeat at Stockport County.

=== FC United of Manchester ===
McManus was released by Crewe in August 2010 and joined FC United of Manchester as a player in the summer of 2010 and was named in the 21 player squad for the 2010–11 season by the club making his debut in the Northern Premier League Premier Division on 22 August 2010.

=== Halifax Town ===
On 17 May 2011, it was announced by Halifax Town that they had signed McManus from FC United. McManus said: "I'm sorry I had to leave – the only reasons I did so were for a greater degree of financial security so I can support my daughter, and to help progress my football career at a higher level."

In his first season at FC Halifax Town McManus started 45 games and scored a late winner in the FA Cup at home to Tadcaster Albion to set the Shaymen on the way to the first round where they met Charlton Athletic. After a poor start to the season at centre back, he was moved to a more comfortable left back role and he excelled, winning numerous end of season awards.

Scott's second season at the Shay ended up starting in October due to a groin operation in the summer. Having dislodged Jason St Juste from the left back position he picked up from where he had left off the previous season, and despite not winning the awards of the 2011–12 season his efforts were appreciated by players and fans alike, especially after FC Halifax Town's victorious Play-off final victory over Brackley Town.

In the 2015-16 he scored the only goal in the final as FC Halifax Town beat Grimsby Town 1–0 to win the FA Trophy.

=== Coalville Town ===
On 21 May 2018, McManus was confirmed as joining Southern League Premier Central side Coalville Town after leaving Halifax Town, citing the reason for the move being his distance to travel regularly from his home in the Midlands.

He left Coalville in 2020, and after a break from senior football, signed for Nuneaton Borough in December of that year. He returned to Coalville Town in January 2024.

=== Barwell ===
In May 2024, McManus joined Barwell.

== Personal life ==
Scott McManus is the brother of Manchester United and England defender Abbie McManus.

== Assault charge ==
McManus received a 16-week suspended prison sentence shortly after signing for FC Halifax Town. He had been charged with assault of his girlfriend during his time at FC United of Manchester. He had been sent off during FC United's second round FA Cup tie with Brighton and Hove Albion and after returning home drunk following a night-out he hit his girlfriend and muffled her cries with a duvet after she had quizzed him about his reasons for wanting to sleep apart. The sentence was suspended for two years and he was also ordered to pay his ex-partner £500.
