= 2013 FA Trophy final =

2013 FA Trophy Final
- Event: 2012–13 FA Trophy
| Grimsby Town | Wrexham |
| 1 | 1 |
- After extra time Wrexham won 4–1 on penalties
- Date: 24 March 2013
- Venue: Wembley Stadium, London
- Man of the Match: Andy Morrell
- Referee: Jon Moss
- Attendance: 35,266

The 2013 FA Trophy Final was the 44th final of the Football Association's cup competition for levels 5–8 of the English football league system. The match was contested between Grimsby Town and Wrexham. It was Wrexham's first visit to Wembley Stadium in their 149-year history.

Grimsby Town defeated Buxton, Havant & Waterlooville, Welling United, Luton Town and Dartford en route to the Final.

Wrexham defeated Rushall Olympic, Solihull Moors, Sutton United, Southport and Gainsborough Trinity en route to the Final.

== Overview ==
The final of the 2013 FA Trophy played between Wrexham and Grimsby Town ended with Wrexham winning 4–1 in a penalty shoot-out after the teams had drawn in the normal time of 90 minutes. Grimsby Town led over Wrexham with a solitary goal scored by Andy Cook in the 71st minute, but Wrexham equalised as captain Keates was fouled inside the box and Kevin Thornton scored the resulting penalty spot-kick. In the ensuing extra time both the teams failed to score leading to a penalty shoot-out. The spot kicks from Adrian Cieslewicz, Danny Wright, Chris Westwood and finally Johnny Hunt, led to Wrexham's victory. Wrexham became the first Welsh club to win the trophy.

== Match ==
=== Details ===
24 March 2013
15:00 GMT

| Grimsby Town | 1–1 (a.e.t.) | Wrexham |
|---|---|---|
| Cook 70' | Report | Thornton 81' (pen.) |
Penalties
| Hatton (penalty missed); Brodie (penalty missed); Colbeck (penalty scored) | 1–4 | (penalty scored) Cieślewicz; (penalty scored) D. Wright; (penalty scored) Westwood; (penalty scored) Hunt |

Wembley Stadium, London
Attendance: 35,266
Referee: Jonathan Moss

| Grimsby Town | Wrexham |

| GK | 13 | (Republic of Ireland) James McKeown |
| RB | 2 | (England) Sam Hatton |
| LB | 3 | (England) Aswad Thomas |
| CB | 5 | (England) Shaun Pearson |
| CB | 6 | (England) Ian Miller |
| RM | 7 | (England) Joe Colbeck |
| CM | 8 | (England) Craig Disley (c) |
| CM | 11 | (England) Frankie Artus |
| FW | 12 | (England) Andy Cook |
| FW | 25 | (England) Ross Hannah | (substituted off) 56' |
| LM | 26 | (England) Marcus Marshall | (substituted off) 86' |
Substitutes:
| DF | 19 | (England) Bradley Wood |
| MF | 15 | (Republic of Ireland) Jamie Devitt |
| MF | 21 | (Albania) Andi Thanoj | (substituted on) 56' |
| FW | 14 | (England) Richard Brodie | (substituted on) 86' |
| FW | 28 | (England) Lenell John-Lewis |
Manager:
(England) Rob Scott & Paul Hurst

| GK | 24 | (Wales) Chris Maxwell |
| RB | 2 | (England) Stephen Wright |
| CB | 23 | (England) Chris Westwood |
| CB | 6 | (England) Martin Riley | (yellow card) 58' |
| LB | 16 | (England) Johnny Hunt |
| CM | 8 | (England) Jay Harris |
| CM | 12 | (England) Dean Keates (c) |
| CM | 29 | (Republic of Ireland) Kevin Thornton | | (substituted off) 89' |
| FW | 9 | (England) Danny Wright |
| FW | 11 | (England) Andy Morrell | | (substituted off) 61' |
| FW | 10 | (England) Brett Ormerod | | (substituted off) 77' |
Substitutes:
| GK | 13 | (England) Andy Coughlin |
| MF | 14 | (England) Joe Clarke | | (substituted on) 89' |
| MF | 17 | (England) Glen Little |
| FW | 7 | (Poland) Adrian Cieślewicz | | (substituted on) 61' |
| FW | 15 | (Wales) Robert Ogleby | | (substituted on) 77' |
Manager:
(England) Andy Morrell
