= FA Trophy =

Association football tournament in England

- Founded: 1969; 57 years ago
- Region: England
- Teams: 320
- Current champions: Southend United (1st title)
- Most championships: Scarborough; Telford United; Woking (3 titles each)
- Broadcaster(s): TNT Sports (final only)
- Website: thefa.com/fa-trophy
- 2026–27 FA Trophy

The Football Association Challenge Trophy, also known as the Isuzu FA Trophy for sponsorship reasons, is a men's football knockout cup competition run by and named after The Football Association (the FA) and competed by mainly National League teams. The competition was introduced in 1969.

Eligibility rules have changed over time, but from 2008 onwards the competition has been open to clubs playing in Steps 1–4 of the National League System, equivalent to tiers 5–8 of the overall English football league system. This covers the National League, the Southern League, Isthmian League, and Northern Premier League.

The final of the competition was held at the original Wembley Stadium from the tournament's instigation until the stadium closed in 2000. The final has been played at the new Wembley Stadium since its opening in 2007. The record for the most FA Trophy wins is shared by Woking and two defunct clubs, Scarborough and Telford United, with three victories each.

The Trophy is currently held by Southend United, who defeated Wealdstone on penalties in the 2026 final.

== History ==
The competition was created by the Football Association in 1969 to afford semi-professional teams an opportunity to compete for the chance to play at the Wembley Stadium. Fully-amateur clubs took part in the long-standing FA Amateur Cup, but most of the leading non-league clubs made at least some form of payment to their players and were therefore ineligible to enter the Amateur Cup. The first winners of the competition were Macclesfield Town of the Northern Premier League, who defeated Telford United of the Southern League in the final. Northern Premier League clubs dominated the first decade of the competition, with Telford United the only Southern League team to break the northern clubs' hold on the competition. In the early years of its existence, the competition struggled to achieve the same level of prestige as the long-established Amateur Cup.

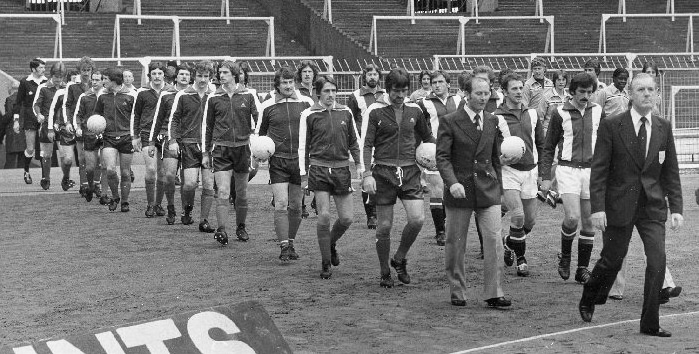
Altrincham v Leatherhead FA Trophy final in 1978

In 1974 the FA abolished the distinction between official professional and amateur status and discontinued the Amateur Cup, and the Trophy soon had 300 entrants. This figure was gradually reduced until by 1991 only around 120 clubs took part. In 1978 the FA moved the final of the Trophy to the Saturday immediately following the FA Cup Final, so as to give it a longer build-up and avoid conflict with clubs' league programmes, which had previously reduced the competition's prestige.

In 1979 the leading Southern and Northern Premier League teams formed the new Alliance Premier League, and teams from this league dominated the Trophy during the 1980s, although in the 1980–81 season Bishop's Stortford of the comparatively lowly Isthmian League First Division entered at the preliminary round and won twelve matches to reach the final, where they defeated Sutton United. Telford United's win in 1989 made them the second team to win the Trophy three times. Between 1990 and 2000 three more teams claimed multiple wins. Former Northern Ireland international Martin O'Neill, in his third managerial role, led Wycombe Wanderers to two wins, and Geoff Chapple managed Kingstonian to victory twice and Woking three times, all within the space of seven years. After Chapple's period of success, Mark Stimson became the first man to manage the Trophy-winning team in three successive seasons, when he led Grays Athletic to victory in 2005 and 2006 and repeated the feat with his new club Stevenage Borough in 2007.

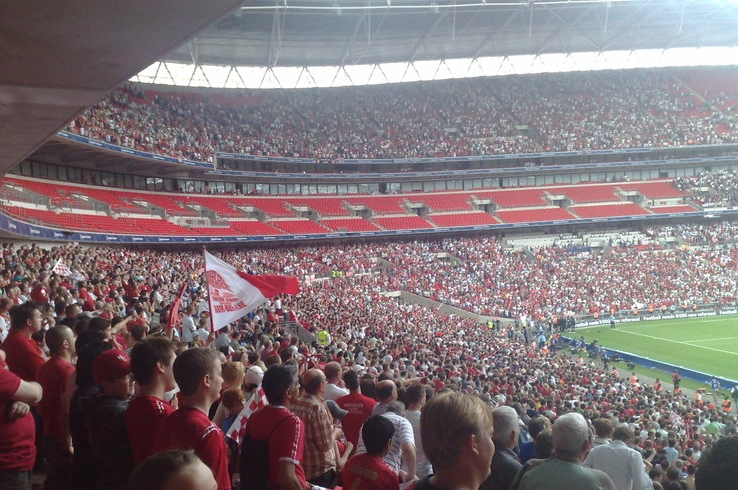
Ebbsfleet United fans at the 2008 final

Originally the competition included as many qualifying rounds as were required to reduce the number of teams to 32. In 1999 the format was amended to match that of the FA Cup, with six rounds prior to the semi-final stage, albeit without qualifying rounds. Teams from the Football Conference received byes through the early rounds, in a similar manner to the way in which the leading clubs receive byes in the FA Cup. As of 2001 the competition was sponsored by Umbro; in the 2007-08 season it was sponsored by Carlsberg.

== Format ==
The competition is a knockout tournament with pairings drawn at random. Since the 2021–22 season all drawn games are immediately settled via a penalty shootout. This was introduced to ease fixture congestion.

The Semi-Finals follow the same procedure as the preceding rounds: hosted by the team drawn first out of the hat and decided by a penalty shootout if the scores remain level after 90 minutes.

The Final is held at Wembley Stadium. A penalty shootout is used if the scores are level at the end of 90 minutes.

As of 2022–23 and the recent non–league restructuring, the competition has featured a maximum of 320 teams representing all clubs from levels 5-8 on the English football league system. The competition features three qualifying rounds (three less than the FA Cup) and eight rounds proper (the same as the FA Cup). Teams from Step 4 (level 8) enter at the first qualifying round stage, those from Step 3 (level 7) at the third qualifying, those from Step 2 (level 6) at the second round proper, and those from Step 1 (level 5) at the third round proper (similar to the FA Cup).

The months in which rounds are played are typical, with exact dates subject to each calendar. The FA pays a cumulative prize fund that rises round-by-round, with exact figures subject to each new edition. See the list of FA Trophy seasons for specific details.

Round	Month	Leagues entering this round	New entries this round	Winners from previous round	Number of fixtures
Qualifying Competition					
First Round	September	Step 4 clubs	160	none	80
Second Round	September	none		80	40
Third Round	October	Step 3 clubs	88	40	64
Competition Proper					
First Round	October/November	none		64	32
Second Round	November	Step 2 clubs	48	32	40
Third Round	December	Step 1 clubs	24	40	32
Fourth Round	January	none		32	16
Fifth Round	February	none		16	8
Sixth Round	March	none		8	4
Semi-Finals	April	none		4	2
Final	May	none		2	1

== Venues ==
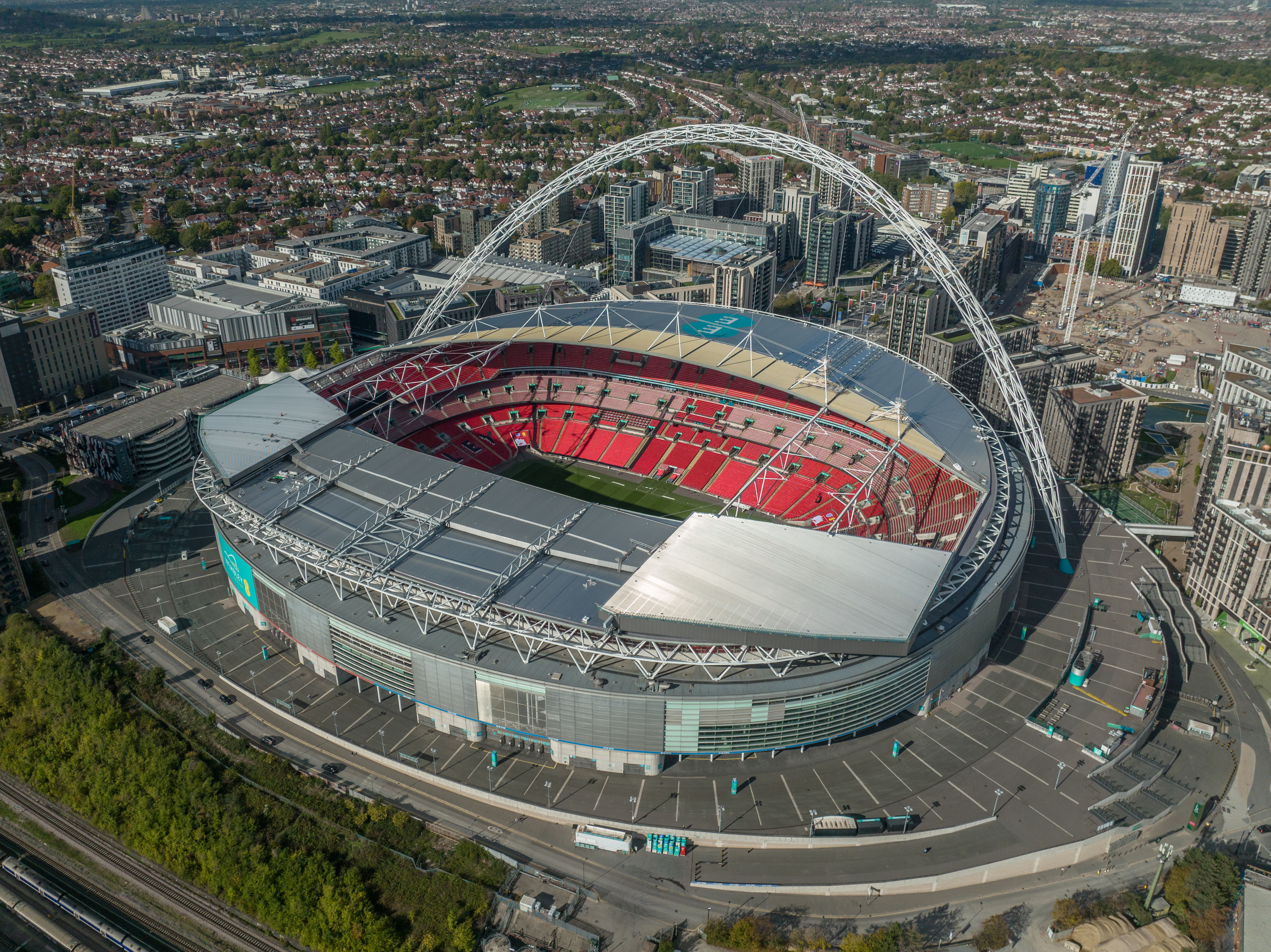
The new Wembley Stadium

The final was traditionally held at the original Wembley Stadium, but was moved to Villa Park during Wembley's redevelopment, and a final was also played at West Ham United's Boleyn Ground. Three replays were required, two of which were held at The Hawthorns, home of West Bromwich Albion, and one at Stoke City F.C.'s Victoria Ground.

In 2007 the final moved to the new Wembley Stadium, and a record crowd of 53,262 saw Stevenage Borough beat Kidderminster Harriers.

== FA Trophy winners and finalists ==
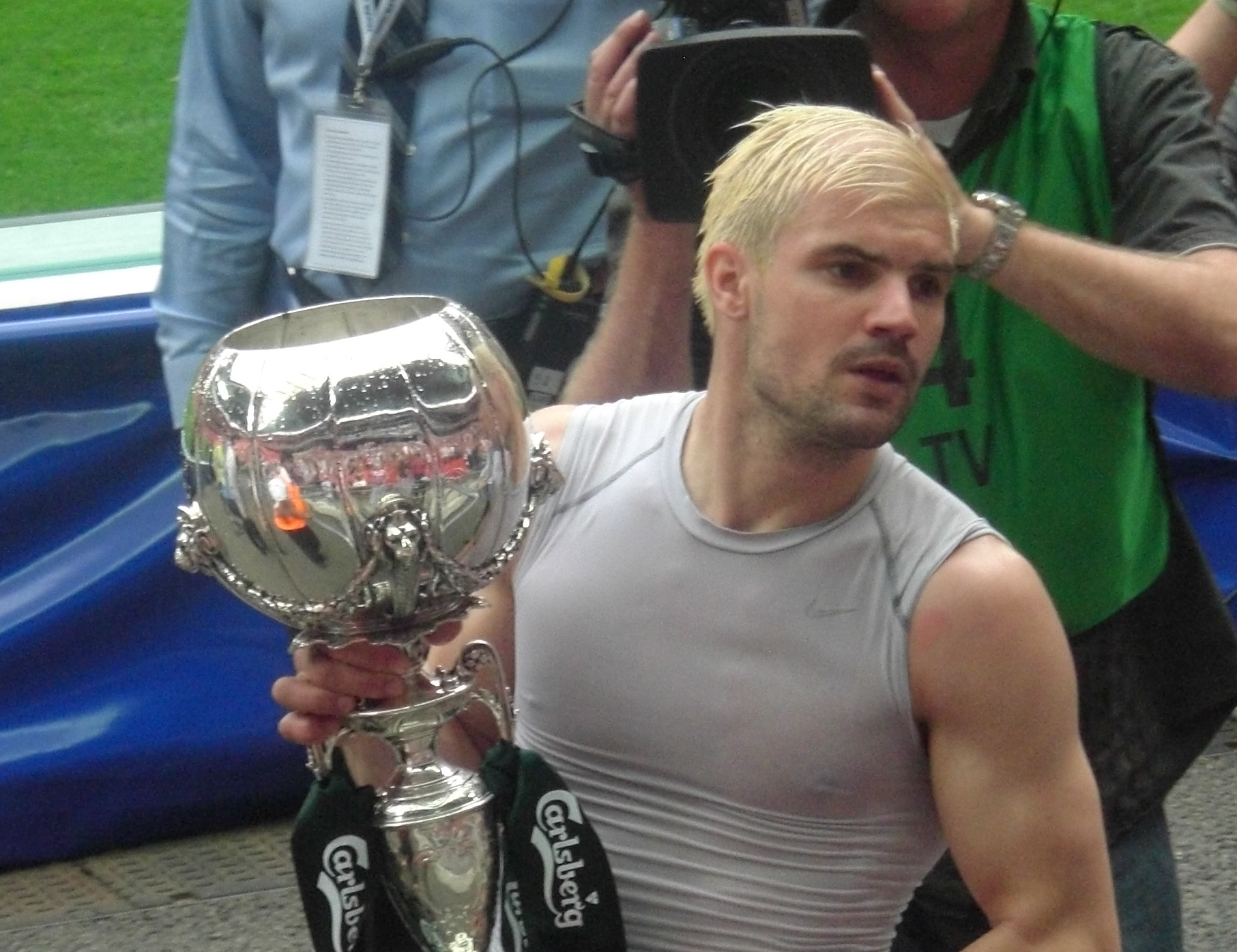
Sacha Opinel, then of Ebbsfleet United, holding the FA Trophy in 2008.

Scarborough (1973, 1976, 1977), Telford United (1971, 1983, 1989), and Woking (1994, 1995, 1997) share the record for the most victories (three) in the final. In 1985 Wealdstone became the first team to win the "Non-League Double" of FA Trophy and Football Conference championship (although in the pre-Conference era both Macclesfield Town and Stafford Rangers had done the double of Northern Premier League championship and FA Trophy in 1970 and 1972 respectively). Since then Colchester United in 1992 and Wycombe Wanderers in 1993 have equalled Wealdstone's achievement.

Three Welsh clubs have reached FA Trophy finals; Bangor City (1984), Newport County (2012), and Wrexham in 2013, 2015 and 2022. Wrexham became the first Welsh winners of the FA Trophy in 2013.

== Media coverage ==
From the 2004–05 season Sky Sports had a deal to show the final of the FA Trophy. This changed in 2007 when the FA agreed a new deal with Setanta Sports to provide coverage of FA Trophy matches with effect from the 2008–09 season. In March 2013 it was announced that S4C would broadcast the 2013 Final between Wrexham and Grimsby Town.

BT Sport showed the 2015 FA Trophy Final live. BT Sport also showed the 2016 FA Trophy Final between FC Halifax Town and Grimsby Town live on 22 May as part of a double-header along with the 2016 FA Vase Final.

== Sponsorship names ==
The competition has used several title-sponsor names. It was known as the Rothmans Trophy during the 2000–01 and 2001–02 seasons, and later as the U*BET FA Trophy. After a period without a title sponsor, a three-season agreement announced in 2021 renamed it the IZIBET FA Trophy. Meridianbet acquired the naming rights in 2024, and the competition has since been called the Meridianbet FA Trophy.
