= 2014–15 Notts County F.C. season =

Notts County F.C.
2014–15 season
- Chairman: Ray Trew
- Manager: Shaun Derry (until 23 March); Paul Hart (caretaker; 24 March—7 April); Ricardo Moniz (from 7 April)
- League One: 21st (relegated)
- FA Cup: First round (eliminated by Accrington Stanley)
- League Cup: First round (eliminated by Sheffield Wednesday)
- League Trophy: Quarter-finals (N) (eliminated by Preston North End)
- Highest home attendance: 7,746
- Lowest home attendance: 3,159 (league); 2,058 (league trophy)
- Average home league attendance: 5,351
| Home colours | Away colours |

The 2014–15 season was Notts County Football Club's 126th year in the Football League and their 5th consecutive season in Football League One, the third division of the English League System.

Manager Shaun Derry was sacked on 23 March 2015, with the club above the League One relegation places on goal difference. Notts County drew all three games under caretaker manager Paul Hart, before appointing Ricardo Moniz as manager on 7 April, with the club now 22nd. The club were relegated on the final day of the season after losing 3–1 to Gillingham, despite having led 1–0 until the 88th minute. In cup competitions, Notts County were eliminated from the FA Cup and League Cup in the first round, and the Football League Trophy in the quarter-finals.

== Match details ==
=== Pre-season ===
| 9 July 2014 | Arnold Town | 0–4 | Notts County | Eagle Valley, Arnold |
| 19:30 BST | | | Murray 21' (pen.); Waite 57', 85'; Trialist 88' | Attendance: 1,019 |

| 12 July 2014 | Mansfield Town | 3–1 | Notts County | Mansfield |
| 15:00 BST | Fisher 19'; Riley 23'; Palmer 89' | Report | McGowan 8' | Stadium: Field Mill; Attendance: 2,231 (705 County fans) |

| 15 July 2014 | Nuneaton Town | 0–0 | Notts County | Nuneaton |
| 19:30 BST | | | | Stadium: Liberty Way |

| 19 July 2014 | Notts County | 1–3 | Derby County | Nottingham |
| 15:00 BST | Whitehouse 30' | Report | Martin 40', 53' (pen.), 76' | Stadium: Meadow Lane; Attendance: 3,235 |

| 22 July 2014 | Carlton Town | 0–4 | Notts County | Bill Stokeld Stadium, Carlton |
| 19:30 BST | | Report | Wroe 39', 61'; Whitehouse 42', 53' |

| 26 July 2014 | FC Halifax Town | 1–0 | Notts County | Halifax |
| 15:00 BST | Jackson 80' | Report | | Stadium: The Shay; Attendance: 720 (Including 135 Notts County Supporters) |

| 29 July 2014 | Notts County | 0–4 | Birmingham City | Nottingham |
| 19:30 BST | | Report | Donaldson 13', 56'; Shinnie 14'; Grounds 88' | Stadium: Meadow Lane; Attendance: 2,016 (Including 681 Away Supporters) |

| 1 August 2014 | Notts County | 2–0 | Osasuna | Nottingham |
| 19:30 BST | Jones 23'; Mullins 42' | Report | | Stadium: Meadow Lane; Attendance: 1,114 |

=== League One ===
==== League table ====
| Pos | Team | Pld | W | D | L | GF | GA | GD | Pts | Promotion, qualification or relegation |
|---|---|---|---|---|---|---|---|---|---|---|
| 19 | Colchester United | 46 | 14 | 10 | 22 | 58 | 77 | −19 | 52 | |
| 20 | Crewe Alexandra | 46 | 14 | 10 | 22 | 43 | 75 | −32 | 52 | |
| 21 | Notts County (R) | 46 | 12 | 14 | 20 | 45 | 63 | −18 | 50 | Relegation to Football League Two |
| 22 | Crawley Town (R) | 46 | 13 | 11 | 22 | 53 | 79 | −26 | 50 | Relegation to Football League Two |
| 23 | Leyton Orient (R) | 46 | 12 | 13 | 21 | 59 | 69 | −10 | 49 | Relegation to Football League Two |

Updated to match(es) played on 3 May 2015. Source: BBC Sport
Rules for classification: 1) Points; 2) Goal difference; 3) Number of goals scored
(R) Relegated

==== Matches ====
The fixtures for the 2014–15 season were announced on 18 June 2014 at 9am.

| 9 August 2014 1 | Preston North End | 1–1 | Notts County | Preston |
| 15:00 | Joe Garner 89' | Report | Jake Cassidy 45' | Stadium: Deepdale; Attendance: 12,857; Referee: David Webb |

| 16 August 2014 2 | Notts County | 0–1 | Fleetwood Town | Nottingham |
| 15:00 | | Report | Jamie Proctor 45' | Stadium: Meadow Lane; Attendance: 5,051; Referee: Mark Heywood |

| 19 August 2014 3 | Notts County | 2–1 | Colchester United | Nottingham |
| 19:45 | Ronan Murray 6'; Liam Noble 71' | Report | Freddie Sears 69' | Stadium: Meadow Lane; Attendance: 3,792; Referee: Geoff Eltringham |

| 23 August 2014 4 | Port Vale | 0–2 | Notts County | Burslem |
| 15:00 | | Report | Jones 11'; Noble 87' | Stadium: Vale Park; Attendance: 5,090; Referee: Mark Brown |

| 31 August 2014 5 | Notts County | 1–2 | Bristol City | Nottingham |
| 15:00 | Ismail 13' | Report | Wilbraham 60'; Emmanuel-Thomas 90+5' (pen.) | Stadium: Meadow Lane; Attendance: 5,678; Referee: Dean Whitestone |

| 13 September 2014 6 | Peterborough United | 0–0 | Notts County | Peterborough |
| 15:00 | | Report | | Stadium: London Road Stadium; Attendance: 6,567; Referee: Tony Harrington |

| 16 September 2014 7 | Notts County | 1–1 | Leyton Orient | Nottingham |
| 19:45 | Ismail 25' (pen.) | Report | Dagnall 51' (pen.) | Stadium: Meadow Lane; Attendance: 4,024; Referee: Gary Sutton |

| 20 September 2014 8 | Notts County | 0–0 | Oldham Athletic | Nottingham |
| 15:00 | Harrad (yellow card) 78' | Report | Wilkinson (yellow card) 8'; Mills (yellow card) 80' | Stadium: Meadow Lane; Attendance: 5,109; Referee: Brendan Malone |

| 27 September 2014 9 | Chesterfield | 1–1 | Notts County | Chesterfield |
| 15:00 | Margreitter 62' | Report | Adams 15' | Stadium: Proact Stadium; Attendance: 7,422; Referee: Andy Woolmer |

| 30 September 2014 10 | Crewe Alexandra | 0–3 | Notts County | Crewe |
| 19:45 | | Report | Cassidy 44', 62'; Tate 52' (o.g.) | Stadium: Gresty Road; Attendance: 3,495; Referee: Keith Hill |

| 4 October 2014 11 | Notts County | 1–0 | Gillingham | Nottingham |
| 15:00 | Noble (yellow card) 32'; Harrad 35'; Carroll (yellow card) 81' | Report | Hessenthaler (yellow card) 32'; Dickenson (yellow card) 56' | Stadium: Meadow Lane; Attendance: 4,800; Referee: Graham Scott |

| 18 October 2014 12 | Notts County | 5–3 | Crawley Town | Meadow Lane, Nottingham |
| 15:00 | Thompson 9', 37', 63'; Ismail 18'; Carroll (yellow card) 55'; Hollis (yellow card) 57'; Jones 80' | Report | Walsh (yellow card) 39'; Edwards 50'; Sadler (yellow card) 54'; Harrold 55'; Leacock (yellow card) 64'; Keane (yellow card) 72'; Elliott 84' | Stadium: Meadow Lane; Attendance: 6,086; Referee: Peter Bankes |

| 21 October 2014 13 | Barnsley | 2–3 | Notts County | Oakwell, Barnsley |
| 19:45 | Cole 8'; Hourihane 12' | Report | Thompson 20'; Petrasso 62', 71'; McLaughlin (yellow card) 89' | Stadium: Oakwell; Attendance: 8,596; Referee: Seb Stockbridge |

| 25 October 2014 14 | Scunthorpe United | 0–1 | Notts County | Scunthorpe |
| 15:00 | | Report | Ismail 89' (pen.) | Stadium: Glanford Park; Attendance: 4,008; Referee: Nigel Miller |

| 1 November 2014 15 | Notts County | 1–2 | Walsall | Nottingham |
| 15:00 | Thompson 31'; Hollis (yellow card) 63' | Report | Jones 16' (o.g.); Bradshaw 64' (pen.); Downing (yellow card) 80' | Stadium: Meadow Lane; Attendance: 5,884; Referee: Simon Hooper |

| 15 November 2014 16 | Coventry City | 0–1 | Notts County | Coventry |
| 15:00 | Finch (yellow card) 87' | BBC Report | Thompson 72'; Noble (yellow card) 87' | Stadium: Ricoh Arena; Attendance: 8,116; Referee: Michael Bull |

| 22 November 2014 17 | Notts County | 1–2 | Yeovil Town | Nottingham |
| 15:00 | Jones (red card) 29'; Noble (yellow card) 30'; Petrasso 63' | Report | Nugent (yellow card) 40'; Edwards (yellow card) 41'; Smith (yellow card) 49'; Arthurworrey (yellow card) 70'; Clarke 84', 88' | Stadium: Meadow Lane; Attendance: 7,746; Referee: Stuart Attwell |

| 28 November 2014 18 | Sheffield United | 1–1 | Notts County | Sheffield |
| 19:45 | Murphy 76' | Report | Edwards 31' | Stadium: Bramall Lane; Attendance: 19,385; Referee: Robert Madley |

| 13 December 2014 19 | Notts County | 0–3 | Swindon Town | Nottingham |
| 15:00 | Noble (yellow card) 31' (yellow-red card) 56'; Carroll (yellow card) 45+2'; Hollis (yellow card) 86' | Report | Williams 6', 54'; Thompson (yellow card) 41'; Kasim (yellow card) 45+2'; Luongo 59' | Stadium: Meadow Lane; Attendance: 4,753; Referee: Darren Deadman |

| 20 December 2014 20 | Rochdale | 2–2 | Notts County | Rochdale |
| 15:00 | Vincenti (yellow card) 44' (goal) 64'; Henderson 46'; Rafferty (yellow card) 72'; Done (yellow card) 90+5' | Report | Edwards 42'; Mullins (yellow card) 55'; Whitehouse (yellow card) 90+2'; Thompson 90+5' | Stadium: Spotland Stadium; Attendance: 2,814; Referee: Scott Mathieson |

| 26 December 2014 21 | Notts County | 0–1 | Milton Keynes Dons | Nottingham |
| 15:00 | McLaughlin (yellow card) 68' | Report | Powell 31' | Stadium: Meadow Lane; Attendance: 5,897; Referee: Andy Madley |

| 28 December 2014 22 | Bradford City | 1–0 | Notts County | Bradford |
| 15:00 | Knott (yellow card) 21' (goal) 41'; McArdle (yellow card) 68'; Zoko (yellow card) 89'; Kennedy (yellow card) 90' | Report | McLaughlin (yellow card) 78' | Stadium: Valley Parade; Attendance: 14,518; Referee: Darren Bond |

| 10 January 2015 23 | Bristol City | 4–0 | Notts County | Bristol |
| 15:00 | Bryan 8'; Smith 43'; Emmanuel-Thomas 62'; Williams 84' | Report | | Stadium: Ashton Gate; Attendance: 12,817; Referee: Simon Hooper |

| 17 January 2015 24 | Notts County | 2–1 | Crewe Alexandra | Nottingham |
| 15:00 | Mullins (yellow card) 23'; Hollis (yellow card) 35'; Noble 45+5' (pen.) (yellow card) 48' (yellow-red card) 90+5'; Daniels 86' | Report | Guthrie (yellow card) 45+4'; Ness 47'; Dugdale (yellow card) 55' | Stadium: Meadow Lane; Attendance: 4,643; Referee: Iain Williamson |

| 20 January 2015 25 | Doncaster Rovers | 0–0 | Notts County | Keepmoat Stadium, Doncaster |
| 19:45 GMT | Keegan (yellow card) 71' | Report | White (yellow card) 55'; Thomas (yellow card) 65' (yellow-red card) 87'; Mullins (yellow card) 77' | Attendance: 5,547; Referee: Richard Clark |

| 24 January 2015 26 | Notts County | 1–2 | Peterborough United | Meadow Lane, Nottingham |
| 15:00 GMT | Smith (yellow card) 24'; Carroll (yellow card) 26'; Thompson 41' | Report | Maddison 13'; Brisley (yellow card) 33'; Burgess 62' (yellow card) 75'; Smith (yellow card) 89' | Attendance: 5,960; Referee: Graham Scott |

| 31 January 2015 27 | Oldham Athletic | 3–0 | Notts County | Oldham |
| 15:00 | Elokobi 30'; Morgan-Smith 32'; Forte 73' | Report | Carroll (yellow card) 31'; Noble (yellow card) 33' | Stadium: Boundary Park; Attendance: 3,493; Referee: Peter Bankes |

| 7 February 2015 28 | Notts County | 0–1 | Chesterfield | Nottingham |
| 15:00 | Hollis (yellow card) 9'; Thompson (yellow card) 45' | Report | Lavery 67'; Darikwa (yellow card) 80'; Hird (yellow card) 83' | Stadium: Meadow Lane; Attendance: 6,649; Referee: Keith Stroud |

| 10 February 2015 29 | Leyton Orient | 0–1 | Notts County | Leyton |
| 19:45 | Cox (yellow card) 80'; Wright (yellow card) 85' | Report | Bajner 20' | Stadium: Brisbane Road; Attendance: 3,534; Referee: James Linington |

| 17 February 2015 30 | Notts County | 1–2 | Sheffield United | Nottingham |
| 19:45 | Noble 35' (yellow card) 90'; Edwards (yellow card) 47'; Thompson (yellow card) 82' | Report | Murphy 16'; Holt (yellow card) 57'; Kennedy (yellow card) 70'; Done 75' | Stadium: Meadow Lane; Attendance: 6,893; Referee: Darren Bond |

| 21 February 2015 31 | Fleetwood Town | 2–1 | Notts County | Fleetwood |
| 15:00 GMT | McAlinden 25'; Hughes (yellow card) 28'; Haughton (yellow card) 50'; Crainey (yellow card) 57' (yellow-red card); Ball 62' | Report | Thompson 11'; Jones (yellow card) 68'; Mullins (yellow card) 88' | Stadium: Highbury Stadium; Attendance: 3,529; Referee: David Webb |

| 28 February 2015 32 | Notts County | 0–1 | Port Vale | Nottingham |
| 15:00 GMT | Mullins (yellow card) 38'; Noble (yellow card) 38' | Report | Marshall 7'; Neal (yellow card) 39'; Inniss (yellow card) 40'; Pope (yellow card) 40' | Stadium: Meadow Lane; Attendance: 5,179; Referee: Darren Drysdale |

| 3 March 2015 33 | Colchester United | 0–1 | Notts County | Colchester |
| 19:45 GMT | Wynter (yellow card) 75'; Osborne (yellow card) 90' | Report | McCourt 68' | Stadium: Weston Homes Community Stadium; Attendance: 2,505; Referee: Carl Berry |

| 7 March 2015 34 | Swindon Town | 3–0 | Notts County | Swindon |
| 15:00 GMT | Byrne (yellow card) 8'; Turnbull (yellow card) 28'; Swift 58'; Williams 64' (pen.); Toffolo 89'; Hylton (yellow card) 90' | Report | McCourt (yellow card) 28'; Adams (yellow card) 64'; Carroll (yellow card) 69'; Noble (yellow card) 84' (yellow-red card) 85' | Stadium: County Ground; Attendance: 8,013; Referee: Gavin Ward |

| 14 March 2015 35 | Notts County | 1–1 | Bradford City | Nottingham |
| 15:00 GMT | McCourt (yellow card) 72'; Edwards 75'; Mullins (yellow card) 85'; Thompson (yellow card) 90' | Report | Routis (yellow card) 29'; Zoko (yellow card) 35'; Stead 45' | Stadium: Meadow Lane; Attendance: 5,166; Referee: Mark Brown |

| 17 March 2015 36 | Notts County | 1–2 | Rochdale | Nottingham |
| 19:45 GMT | McCourt (yellow card) 17'; Thompson 30'; Adams (yellow card) 73'; Edwards (yellow card) 83' | Report | Dawson (yellow card) 12'; Henderson 35'; Vincenti 54' | Stadium: Meadow Lane; Attendance: 3,159; Referee: Richard Clark |

| 21 March 2015 37 | Milton Keynes Dons | 4–1 | Notts County | Milton Keynes |
| 15:00 GMT | C. Baker 63'; L. Baker 74'; Grigg 84', 90'; Randall (yellow card) 90' | Report | Whitehouse (yellow card) 51' (goal) 79'; Smith (yellow card) 57'; Spencer (yellow card) 90' | Stadium: Stadium MK; Attendance: 11,911; Referee: Keith Hill |

| 28 March 2015 38 | Notts County | 2–2 | Scunthorpe United | Nottingham |
| 15:00 GMT | Jones 10'; Smith (yellow card) 34'; Bajner 73'; Williams (yellow card) 77' | Report | Robinson 1' (yellow card) 90+1'; Madden (yellow card) 6'; McSheffrey (yellow card) 44'; Canavan 86' | Stadium: Meadow Lane; Attendance: 4,990; Referee: (England) Paul Tierney (referee) |

| 3 April 2015 39 | Walsall | 0–0 | Notts County | Walsall |
| 15:00 GMT | | Report | | Stadium: Bescot Stadium; Attendance: 4,353; Referee: (England) Graham Horwood |

| 6 April 2015 40 | Notts County | 0–0 | Coventry City | Nottingham |
| 15:00 GMT | Smith (yellow card) 45+2'; Edwards (yellow card) 86'; Hollis (yellow card) 90+3' | Report | | Stadium: Meadow Lane; Attendance: 6,706; Referee: (England) Jeremy Simpson |

| 11 April 2015 41 | Yeovil Town | 1–1 | Notts County | Yeovil |
| 15:00 GMT | Hollis 10' (o.g.); Foley (yellow card) 67'; Webster (yellow card) 80'; Arthurworrey (yellow card) 82' | Report | Dumbuya (yellow card) 64'; Thompson 79' | Stadium: Huish Park; Attendance: 3,947; Referee: (England) Darren Drysdale |

| 14 April 2015 42 | Notts County | 1–1 | Barnsley | Nottingham |
| 19:45 GMT | Smith (yellow card) 23'; Jones (yellow card) 73'; Bajner 90+2' (yellow card) 90+3'; Thompson (yellow card) 90+5' | Report | Winnall 9'; Ramage (yellow card) 68'; Cranie (yellow card) 72'; Hourihane (yellow card) 74'; Holgate (yellow card) 82' | Stadium: Meadow Lane; Attendance: 4,287; Referee: (England) Graham Salisbury (referee) |

| 18 April 2015 43 | Crawley Town | 2–0 | Notts County | Crawley |
| 15:00 GMT | Youga 14'; Ward 16'; Simpson (yellow card) 39'; Young (yellow card) 71' | Report | Smith (yellow card) 89' | Stadium: Checkatrade.com Stadium; Attendance: 2,580; Referee: (England) Lee Collins |

| 21 April 2015 44 | Notts County | 1–3 | Preston North End | Nottingham |
| 19:45 GMT | Carroll (yellow card) 64'; Spencer 72' | Report | Beckford 23' 85'; Garner 31' (yellow card) 75' | Stadium: Meadow Lane; Attendance: 4,769; Referee: (England) Carl Boyeson |

| 25 April 2015 45 | Notts County | 2–1 | Doncaster Rovers | Nottingham |
| 15:00 GMT | Thompson 8'; Hollis (yellow card) 46'; Noble 60'; Burke (yellow card) 64'; Bajner (yellow card) 70' | Report | Butler (yellow card) 67'; Jones (yellow card) 90+1'; Tyson 90+5' (pen.) | Stadium: Meadow Lane; Attendance: 5,857; Referee: (England) Kevin Johnson |

| 3 May 2015 46 | Gillingham | 3–1 | Notts County | Gillingham, Kent |
| 12:15 GMT | Egan 88' (yellow card) 88'; Dickenson 90+3'; Norris 90+5' | Report | Adams (yellow card) 50'; Burke 61' (yellow card) 61'; McCourt (yellow card) 90+2' | Stadium: Priestfield Stadium; Attendance: 8,443; Referee: (England) Stuart Attwell |

=== FA Cup ===
The draw for the first round of the FA Cup was made on 27 October 2014.

| 9 November 2014 First round | Notts County | 0–0 | Accrington Stanley | Nottingham |
| 15:00 | Adams (yellow card) 62' | Report | Joyce (yellow card) 56'; Aldred (yellow card) 60'; Procter (yellow card) 65'; Atkinson (yellow card) 80' | Stadium: Meadow Lane; Attendance: 3,661; Referee: Darren Bond |

| 18 November 2014 First round replay | Accrington Stanley | 2–1 | Notts County | Accrington |
| 19:45 | Aldred (yellow card) 11'; Atkinson (yellow card) 40'; Joyce 45'; Carver 49'; Procter (yellow card) 59' | Report | Murray 12'; Cranston (yellow card) 56'; Carroll (yellow card) 83' | Stadium: Crown Ground; Attendance: 1,026; Referee: Eddie Ilderton |

=== League Cup ===
The draw for the first round of the 2014–15 Football League Cup was made on 17 June 2014 at 10:00. Notts County were drawn away to Sheffield Wednesday and were eliminated from the competition after suffering a 3–0 defeat.

| 12 August 2014 Round One | Sheffield Wednesday | 3–0 | Notts County | Sheffield |
| 19:45 | Maghoma 2'; Madine 10'; Nuhiu 65' | Report | | Stadium: Hillsborough Stadium; Attendance: 12,851; Referee: Eddie Ilderton |

=== Football League Trophy ===
| 2 September 2014 Round One | Notts County | 2–0 | Mansfield Town | Nottingham |
| 19:45 | Murray 28'; Cassidy 65' | Report | | Stadium: Meadow Lane; Attendance: 3,701; Referee: Mark Haywood |

| 7 October 2014 Round Two | Scunthorpe United | 1–2 | Notts County | Scunthorpe |
| 19:45 | Madden 14' (yellow card) 76' | Report | McLaughlin 23' (yellow card) 44'; Murray 32'; Thompson (yellow card) 77' | Stadium: Glanford Park; Attendance: 1,509; Referee: Andy Haines |

| 9 December 2014 Area Q-Final | Doncaster Rovers | 0–1 | Notts County | Keepmoat Stadium, Doncaster |
| 19:30 GMT | | Report | Hall (yellow card) 63'; Noble 74'; Traoré (yellow card) 83' | Attendance: 2,570; Referee: Phil Gibbs |

| 16 December 2014 Area S-Final | Notts County | 0–1 | Preston North End | Meadow Lane, Nottingham |
| 19:45 GMT | Smith (yellow card) 35'; Thompson (yellow card) 74'; Hall (yellow card) 86' | Report | Huntington 20'; Little (yellow card) 90+1' | Attendance: 2,058; Referee: Phil Gibbs |

== Transfers ==
=== In ===
| No. | Pos. | Nat. | Name | Age | EU | Moving from | Type | Transfer window | Ends | Transfer fee | Source |
|---|---|---|---|---|---|---|---|---|---|---|---|
| 14 | DF | (England) | Taylor McKenzie | 19 | EU | Sheffield Wednesday | Bosman | Summer | 2016 | Free | |
| 5 | MF | (England) | Hayden Mullins | 35 | EU | Birmingham City | Bosman | Summer | 2015 | Free | |
| 16 | MF | (England) | Liam Noble | 23 | EU | Carlisle United | Bosman | Summer | 2016 | Free | |
| 4 | MF | (England) | Alan Smith | 33 | EU | Milton Keynes Dons | Bosman | Summer | 2015 | Free | |
| 8 | MF | (England) | Nicky Wroe | 28 | EU | Preston North End | Bosman | Summer | 2016 | Free | |
| 3 | DF | (England) | Blair Adams | 22 | EU | Coventry City | Bosman | Summer | 2016 | Free | |
| 21 | DF | (England) | Cieron Keane | 17 | EU | Wolverhampton Wanderers | Bosman | Summer | 2016 | Free | |
| 11 | MF | (England) | Garry Thompson | 33 | EU | Bradford City | Bosman | Summer | 2015 | Free | |
| 1 | GK | (Northern Ireland) | Roy Carroll | 36 | EU | Olympiacos (Greece) | Bosman | Summer | 2015 | Free | |
| 26 | MF | (England) | Elliott Whitehouse | 20 | EU | Sheffield United | Bosman | Summer | 2015 | Free | |
| 13 | MF | (England) | Gary Jones | 37 | EU | Bradford City | Bosman | Summer | 2015 | Free | |
| 28 | DF | (England) | Mike Edwards | 34 | EU | Carlisle United | Bosman | Summer | 2015 | Free | |
| 24 | FW | (England) | Shaun Harrad | 29 | EU | Alfreton Town | Free transfer | Summer | 2015 | Free | |
| 33 | DF | (England) | Jordan Cranston | 21 | EU | Nuneaton Town | Free transfer | Summer | 2015 | Free | |
| 25 | FW | (Ivory Coast) | Drissa Traoré | 22 | EU | Le Havre (France) | Free transfer | Summer | 2015 | Free | |
| 7 | MF | (Republic of Ireland) | Will Hayhurst | 20 | EU | Preston North End | Transfer | Winter | 2016 | Undisclosed | |
| 20 | MF | (England) | Billy Daniels | 20 | EU | Coventry City | Transfer | Winter | 2016 | Undisclosed | |
| 27 | FW | (Hungary) | Bálint Bajner | 24 | EU | Ipswich Town | Free transfer | Winter | 2015 | Free | |

=== Out ===
| No. | Pos. | Nat. | Name | Age | EU | Moving to | Type | Transfer window | Transfer fee | Source |
|---|---|---|---|---|---|---|---|---|---|---|
| 28 | MF | (Trinidad and Tobago) | Andre Boucaud | 29 | EU | Dagenham & Redbridge | Released | Summer | Free | |
| 20 | MF | (Jamaica) | Jamal Campbell-Ryce | 31 | EU | Sheffield United | Released | Summer | Free | |
| 14 | FW | (England) | Adam Coombes | 22 | EU | Free agent | Released | Summer | Free | |
| 22 | MF | (Scotland) | Mark Fotheringham | 30 | EU | Fulham | Released | Summer | Free | |
| 33 | FW | (England) | Malachi Lavelle-Moore | 19 | EU | Macclesfield Town | Released | Summer | Free | |
| 6 | DF | (England) | Dean Leacock | 29 | EU | Crawley Town | Released | Summer | Free | |
| 4 | MF | (England) | Gary Liddle | 27 | EU | Bradford City | Released | Summer | Free | |
| 30 | MF | (Scotland) | Malcolm Melvin | 19 | EU | Free agent | Released | Summer | Free | |
| 31 | FW | (England) | Romello Nangle | 19 | EU | Free agent | Released | Summer | Free | |
| 29 | DF | (Wales) | Gareth Roberts | 36 | EU | Chester | Released | Summer | Free | |
| 9 | FW | (Nigeria) | Enoch Showunmi | 32 | EU | Free agent | Released | Summer | Free | |
| 5 | DF | (England) | Manny Smith | 25 | EU | Wrexham (Wales) | Released | Summer | Free | |
| 3 | DF | (Republic of Ireland) | Alan Sheehan | 27 | EU | Bradford City | Released | Summer | Free | |
| 1 | GK | (Poland) | Bartosz Białkowski | 27 | EU | Ipswich Town | Transfer | Summer | Undisclosed | |
| 17 | FW | (England) | Tyrell Waite | 20 | EU | Lincoln City | Free transfer | Winter | Free | |
| 32 | MF | (England) | Kyle Dixon | 20 | EU | Boston United | Released | Winter | Free | |
| 24 | FW | (France) | Jeremy Balmy | 20 | EU | Oxford United | Released | Winter | Free | |
| 20 | FW | (England) | Danny Haynes | 27 | EU | Cheltenham Town | Released | Winter | Free | |

EU = if holds or not a European Union passport; Country: when 2 flags, 1st flag = country that plays for internationally, 2nd flag = country of birth; N = number on jersey; P = Position (for position name, pause mouse pointer on abbreviation); Name = Name on jersey (for more extensive name, pause mouse pointer on name); Age = age on the day of the signing; Moving from = only indicate the club the player was playing before start playing for this club in this season, for the type of the moving see Status column; Moving to = only indicates the club the player is going to play next, for the type of the moving see Status column; Ends = when the player's current contract ends; n/a = Not applicable.

=== Loans in ===
| No. | Pos. | Name | Country | Age | Loan club | Started | Ended | Start source | End source |
|---|---|---|---|---|---|---|---|---|---|
| 7 | MF | Zeli Ismail | (England) | 20 | Wolverhampton Wanderers | 18 July 2014 | January 2015 | | |
| 12 | FW | Jake Cassidy | (Wales) | 21 | Wolverhampton Wanderers | 25 July 2014 | January 2015 | | |
| 25 | MF | Adam Dawson | (England) | 21 | Leicester City | 7 August 2014 | 4 September 2014 | | |
| 32 | MF | Reece Brown | (England) | 18 | Birmingham City | 28 August 2014 | 25 September 2014 | | |
| 34 | DF | Louis Laing | (England) | 21 | Nottingham Forest | 12 September 2014 | 13 December 2014 | | |
| 32 | MF | Stephen McLaughlin | (Republic of Ireland) | 24 | Nottingham Forest | 30 December 2014 | 27 October 2014 | | |
| 36 | MF | Michael Petrasso | (Canada) | 19 | Queens Park Rangers | 14 October 2014 | 11 November 2014 | | |
| 37 | MF | Ryan Hall | (England) | 26 | Rotherham United | 27 November 2014 | 5 January 2015 | | |
| 38 | MF | Alefe Santos | (Brazil) | 19 | Derby County | 9 January 2015 | 12 February 2015 | | |
| 12 | FW | Kwame Thomas | (England) | 19 | Derby County | 12 January 2015 | 12 February 2015 | | |
| 17 | DF | Hayden White | (England) | 19 | Bolton Wanderers | 19 January 2015 | 2 March 2015 | | |
| 24 | FW | Kaiyne Woolery | (England) | 20 | Bolton Wanderers | 29 January 2015 | 28 February 2015 | | |
| 12 | DF | Sean Newton | (England) | 26 | Lincoln City | 13 February 2015 | 30 June 2015 | | |
| 34 | MF | Paddy McCourt | (Northern Ireland) | 31 | Brighton & Hove Albion | 21 February 2015 | 30 June 2015 | | |
| — | MF | Jamal Campbell-Ryce | (Jamaica) | 31 | Sheffield United | 26 February 2015 | 30 June 2015 | | |
| — | FW | Leroy Lita | (England) | 30 | Barnsley | 3 March 2015 | 30 June 2015 | | |
| — | FW | Graham Burke | (Republic of Ireland) | 21 | Aston Villa | 26 March 2015 | 30 June 2015 | | |
| — | MF | Jordan Williams | (Wales) | 19 | Liverpool | 26 March 2015 | 30 June 2015 | | |

Sources: For loan start source see "Start source". For loan end source see "End source".
EU = if holds or not a European Union passport; Country: when 2 flags, 1st flag = country that plays for internationally, 2nd flag = country of birth; No. = number on jersey; P = Position (for position name, pause mouse pointer on abbreviation); Name = Name on jersey (for more extensive name, pause mouse pointer on name); In/Out = In: The player came in on loan, Out: The player went out on loan; Loan club = the club that the player moved on loan to or the club that the player came from on loan; Started = the date when the player's loan started; Ended = the date when the player's loan ended.

=== Loans out ===
| No. | Pos. | Name | Country | Age | Loan club | Started | Ended | Start source | End source |
|---|---|---|---|---|---|---|---|---|---|
| 17 | FW | Tyrell Waite | (England) | 20 | Nuneaton Town | 21 August 2014 | 18 September 2014 | | |
| 27 | GK | Harry Andrews | (England) | 18 | Rainworth Miners Welfare | 5 September 2014 | 3 October 2014 | | |
| 22 | DF | Brad McGowan | (England) | 18 | Rainworth Miners Welfare | 5 September 2014 | 3 October 2014 | | |
| 19 | MF | Greg Tempest | (Northern Ireland) | 20 | Boston United | 27 September 2014 | 27 December 2014 | | |
| 18 | MF | Kyle Dixon | (England) | 19 | Boston United | 27 September 2014 | 27 December 2014 | | |
| 17 | FW | Tyrell Waite | (England) | 20 | Ilkeston | 2 October 2014 | 31 October 2014 | | |
| 20 | FW | Danny Haynes | (England) | 26 | Crewe Alexandra | 21 October 2014 | 25 November 2014 | | |
| 33 | DF | Jordan Cranston | (Wales) | 21 | Lincoln City | 13 February 2015 | 30 June 2015 | | |
| 31 | FW | Shaun Harrad | (England) | 30 | Cheltenham Town | 26 February 2015 | 30 June 2015 | | |

Sources: For loan start source see "Start source". For loan end source see "End source".
EU = if holds or not a European Union passport; Country: when 2 flags, 1st flag = country that plays for internationally, 2nd flag = country of birth; No. = number on jersey; P = Position (for position name, pause mouse pointer on abbreviation); Name = Name on jersey (for more extensive name, pause mouse pointer on name); In/Out = In: The player came in on loan, Out: The player went out on loan; Loan club = the club that the player moved on loan to or the club that the player came from on loan; Started = the date when the player's loan started; Ended = the date when the player's loan ended.
