= 2013–14 Notts County F.C. season =

Notts County
2013–14 season
- Chairman: Ray Trew
- Manager: Chris Kiwomya (until 27 Oct); Shaun Derry (from 6 Nov)
- League One: 20th
- FA Cup: First round
- League Cup: Second round
- League Trophy: Third round
- Top goalscorer: League: Callum McGregor (12); All: Callum McGregor (14)
- Highest home attendance: 8,564 vs Sheffield United (L1, 11 Jan 14)
- Lowest home attendance: 1,240 vs Burton Albion (LT, 2 Sep 13)
- Average home league attendance: 5,291

The 2013–14 English football season was Notts County Football Club's 125th year in the Football League and their fourth consecutive season in Football League One, the third division of the English League System.

On 13 September 2013, Jack Grealish joined the club on a youth loan until 13 January 2014. The 18 year-old made his professional debut the following day, coming on as a 59th-minute substitute for David Bell in a 3–1 away defeat to Milton Keynes Dons. On 7 December, he scored his first career goal, beating three defenders to score the last goal in a 3–1 win over Gillingham at Meadow Lane, and followed this a week later by opening a 4–0 victory at Colchester United. Grealish extended his loan with Notts County on 17 January 2014 until the end of the season.

== League One data ==
=== League table ===
Pos	Team	Pld	W	D	L	GF	GA	GD	Pts	Promotion, qualification or relegation
18	Coventry City	46	16	13	17	74	77	−3	51 (Note: On 2 August Coventry City were deducted 10 points for exiting administration without a CVA.)	
19	Crewe Alexandra	46	13	12	21	54	80	−26	51	
20	Notts County	46	15	5	26	64	77	−13	50	
21	Tranmere Rovers (R)	46	12	11	23	52	79	−27	47	Relegation to Football League Two
22	Carlisle United (R)	46	11	12	23	43	76	−33	45	Relegation to Football League Two

Updated to match(es) played on 3 May 2014. Source: BBC Sport
Rules for classification: 1) Points; 2) Goal difference; 3) Number of goals scored
(R) Relegated

=== Result summary ===
Overall								Home						Away					
Pld	W	D	L	GF	GA	GD	Pts	W	D	L	GF	GA	GD	W	D	L	GF	GA	GD
46	15	5	26	64	77	−13	50	12	2	9	40	28	+12	3	3	17	24	49	−25

Last updated: 14 July 2014.

=== Result by round ===
Round	1	2	3	4	5	6	7	8	9	10	11	12	13	14	15	16	17	18	19	20	21	22	23	24	25	26	27	28	29	30	31	32	33	34	35	36	37	38	39	40	41	42	43	44	45	46
Ground	A	H	A	H	H	A	A	H	A	H	A	A	H	H	A	H	A	A	H	H	A	H	A	A	H	H	A	A	H	A	H	A	H	A	H	H	A	H	A	H	A	H	A	H	H	A
Result	L	L	D	L	L	L	L	W	L	W	L	L	L	W	L	L	L	D	L	W	W	D	L	L	W	W	W	L	L	L	W	L	L	L	D	L	L	W	W	W	L	W	L	W	W	D
Position	19	21	21	21	23	24	24	23	23	19	22	23	24	21	24	24	24	24	24	24	22	22	23	24	23	21	16	16	19	22	19	21	23	24	24	24	24	24	23	19	23	20	22	21	19	20

Updated to match(es) played on 14 July 2014. Source:
A = Away; H = Home; W = Win; D = Draw; L = Loss

== Kit ==
Supplier: Fila
Sponsor(s): 3663 (Home)
Pinacle.eu.com (Away)

Home	Away

Last updated: 23 July 2013.

== Squad ==
No.	Name	Position (s)	Nationality	Place of birth	Date of birth	Club caps	Club goals	Signed from	Date signed	Fee	Contract End
Goalkeepers
1	Bartosz Białkowski	GK	(Poland)	Braniewo	6 July 1986 (aged 27)	92	0	Southampton	15 June 2012	Free	2015
23	Fabian Spiess	GK	(Germany)	Wesel	22 February 1994 (aged 20)	11	0	Academy	1 August 2011	Trainee	Undisclosed
35	Kevin Pilkington	GK	(England)	Hitchin	8 May 1974 (aged 40)	151	0	Luton Town	17 October 2012	Free	2015
Defenders
2	Mustapha Dumbuya	RB/RW	(Sierra Leone)		7 August 1987 (aged 26)	27	0	Crawley Town	2 July 2013	Free	2015
3	Alan Sheehan	LB/CB	(Republic of Ireland)	Athlone	14 September 1986 (aged 27)	126	10	Swindon Town	3 June 2011	Free	2014
4	Gary Liddle	CB/DM	(England)	Middlesbrough	15 June 1986 (aged 28)	87	4	Hartlepool United	21 June 2012	Free	2014
5	Manny Smith	CB	(England)	Birmingham	8 November 1988 (aged 25)	34	0	Walsall	1 July 2012	Free	2014
6	Dean Leacock	CB/DM	(England)	London	10 June 1984 (aged 30)	74	2	Leyton Orient	26 June 2012	Free	2014
26	Haydn Hollis	CB	(England)	Selston	14 October 1992 (aged 21)	17	4	Academy	1 August 2009	Trainee	2016
29	Gareth Roberts	LB/CB	(Wales)	Wrexham	6 February 1978 (aged 36)	6	0	Bury	31 January 2014	Free	2014
Midfielders
7	Jack Grealish	RW/AM	(Republic of Ireland)	Birmingham	10 September 1995 (aged 18)	39	5	Aston Villa	13 September 2013	Loan	2014
8	Callum McGregor	CM/CF	(Scotland)	Glasgow	14 June 1993 (aged 21)	40	14	Celtic	6 August 2013	Loan	2014
20	Jamal Campbell-Ryce	WG	(Jamaica)	London	6 April 1983 (aged 31)	79	11	Bristol City	3 July 2012	Free	2014
21	Curtis Thompson	CM/WG/RB	(England)	Nottingham	2 September 1993 (aged 20)	17	0	Academy	1 July 2011	Trainee	2015
22	Mark Fotheringham	CM	(Scotland)	Dundee	22 October 1983 (aged 30)	26	1	Ross County	23 July 2013	Free	2014
24	Josh Vela	CM	(England)	Salford	14 December 1993 (aged 20)	5	0	Bolton Wanderers	21 March 2014	Loan	2014
25	Greg Tempest	CM/LM	(Northern Ireland)	Nottingham	28 December 1993 (aged 20)	18	0	Academy	1 July 2012	Trainee	2015
28	Andre Boucaud	CM	(Trinidad and Tobago)	Enfield	10 October 1984 (aged 29)	73	1	Luton Town	10 January 2013	Undisclosed	2014
30	Malcolm Melvin	CM	(Scotland)	Birmingham	8 May 1995 (aged 19)	0	0	Aston Villa	26 June 2013	Free	2014
32	Kyle Dixon	CM/RB	(England)	Nottingham	19 November 1994 (aged 19)	1	0	Academy	1 July 2013	Trainee	2015
Forwards
9	Enoch Showunmi	CF	(Nigeria)	London	21 April 1982 (aged 32)	42	6	Tranmere Rovers	12 June 2012	Free	2014
10	Danny Haynes	CF/WG	(England)	Peckham	19 January 1988 (aged 26)	23	4	Charlton Athletic	11 July 2013	Free	2015
14	Adam Coombes	CF	(England)	Carshalton	19 June 1991 (aged 23)	8	1	Chelsea	1 August 2013	Free	2014
16	Jimmy Spencer	CF	(England)	Leeds	13 December 1991 (aged 22)	13	5	Huddersfield Town	3 February 2014	Free	2014
17	Tyrell Waite	CF	(England)	Derby	1 July 1994 (aged 19)	9	1	Ilkeston	21 March 2012	Undisclosed	2015
19	Ronan Murray	CF/WG	(Republic of Ireland)	Castlebar	12 September 1991 (aged 22)	25	8	Ipswich Town	16 August 2013	Free	2014
27	Jeremy Balmy	CF	(France)		19 April 1994 (aged 20)	1	0	Le Havre	29 December 2013	Free	2016
31	Romello Nangle	CF	(England)	Nottingham	8 January 1995 (aged 19)	10	1	Academy	1 September 2012	Trainee	2014
33	Malachi Lavelle-Moore	CF	(England)	Nottingham		0	0	Academy	1 July 2013	Trainee	2014
38	Callum Ball	CF	(England)	Leicester	8 October 1992 (aged 21)	5	1	Derby County	28 November 2013	Loan	2014
39	Nathan Tyson	CF/WG	(England)	Reading	4 May 1982 (aged 32)	10	0	Blackpool	3 March 2014	Loan	2014

=== Statistics ===
As of 14 July 2014

No.	Pos	Nat	Player	Total		League One		FA Cup		League Cup		League Trophy	
No.	Pos	Nat	Player	Apps	Goals	Apps	Goals	Apps	Goals	Apps	Goals	Apps	Goals
1	GK	(Poland) POL	Bartosz Białkowski	49	0	45	0	1	0	2	0	1	0
2	DF	(Sierra Leone) SLE	Mustapha Dumbuya	27	0	23+1	0	0	0	2	0	1	0
3	DF	(Republic of Ireland) IRL	Alan Sheehan	47	6	44	6	1	0	1	0	1	0
4	MF	(England) ENG	Gary Liddle	37	4	32	4	1	0	1	0	3	0
5	DF	(England) ENG	Manny Smith	28	0	20+4	0	0	0	2	0	2	0
6	DF	(England) ENG	Dean Leacock	32	2	26+1	1	1	1	1	0	3	0
7	MF	(Republic of Ireland) IRL	Jack Grealish (on loan from Aston Villa)	39	5	32+5	5	1	0	0	0	1	0
8	MF	(Scotland) SCO	Callum McGregor (on loan from Celtic)	40	14	31+5	12	1	0	2	1	1	1
9	FW	(Nigeria) NGR	Enoch Showunmi	16	4	9+5	3	0+1	0	1	1	0	0
10	FW	(England) ENG	Danny Haynes	22	4	15+5	3	0	0	1	1	0+1	0
14	FW	(England) ENG	Adam Coombes	8	1	3+3	0	0	0	0+1	1	1	0
16	FW	(England) ENG	Jimmy Spencer	13	5	13	5	0	0	0	0	0	0
17	FW	(England) ENG	Tyrell Waite	1	0	0+1	0	0	0	0	0	0	0
18	MF	(England) ENG	Andy Haworth	3	0	0+2	0	0	0	0	0	0+1	0
19	FW	(Republic of Ireland) IRL	Ronan Murray	26	9	15+9	7	0+1	1	0	0	1	1
20	MF	(Jamaica) JAM	Jamal Campbell-Ryce	40	3	36	3	1	0	1	0	2	0
21	MF	(England) ENG	Curtis Thompson	16	0	8+3	0	1	0	0+1	0	3	0
22	MF	(Scotland) SCO	Mark Fotheringham	33	1	23+5	1	1	0	2	0	2	0
23	GK	(Germany) GER	Fabian Speiss	3	0	1	0	0	0	0	0	2	0
24	MF	(England) ENG	Josh Vela (on loan from Bolton Wanderers)	7	0	7	0	0	0	0	0	0	0
25	MF	(Northern Ireland) NIR	Greg Tempest	15	0	8+6	0	0	0	1	0	0	0
26	DF	(England) ENG	Hayden Hollis	10	4	9+1	4	0	0	0	0	0	0
27	FW	(France) FRA	Jeremy Balmy	1	0	0+1	0	0	0	0	0	0	0
28	MF	(Trinidad and Tobago) TTO	Andre Boucaud	32	0	26+2	0	0+1	0	0+2	0	1	0
29	DF	(Wales) WAL	Gareth Roberts	6	0	6	0	0	0	0	0	0	0
30	MF	(Scotland) SCO	Malcolm Melvin	0	0	0	0	0	0	0	0	0	0
31	FW	(England) ENG	Romello Nangle	2	0	0+1	0	0	0	0	0	0+1	0
32	MF	(England) ENG	Kyle Dixon	1	0	0+1	0	0	0	0	0	0	0
33	FW	(England) ENG	Malachi Lavelle-Moore	0	0	0	0	0	0	0	0	0	0
35	GK	(England) ENG	Kevin Pilkington	0	0	0	0	0	0	0	0	0	0
38	FW	(England) ENG	Callum Ball (on loan from Derby County)	6	1	3+3	1	0	0	0	0	0	0
39	FW	(England) ENG	Nathan Tyson (on loan from Blackpool)	10	0	4+6	0	0	0	0	0	0	0
Players who left the club:
11	MF	(England) ENG	David Bell	12	0	4+6	0	0	0	1	0	1	0
12	FW	(Canada) CAN	Marcus Haber (on loan from Stevenage)	10	2	4+6	2	0	0	0	0	0	0
12	DF	(England) ENG	Hayden Mullins (on loan from Birmingham City)	16	1	15+1	1	0	0	0	0	0	0
13	FW	(Ivory Coast) CIV	François Zoko	1	0	0+1	0	0	0	0	0	0	0
15	FW	(France) FRA	Yoann Arquin	18	4	4+8	3	1	0	1+1	1	3	0
15	FW	(England) ENG	Kwesi Appiah (on loan from Crystal Palace)	7	0	1+6	0	0	0	0	0	0	0
16	MF	(England) ENG	Joss Labadie	21	1	15	1	1	0	2	0	3	0
24	DF	(England) ENG	Kieron Freeman (on loan from Derby County)	16	0	16	0	0	0	0	0	0	0
24	DF	(Republic of Ireland) IRL	Enda Stevens (on loan from Aston Villa)	4	0	2	0	0	0	1	0	1	0
29	DF	(England) ENG	Callum Bennett	0	0	0	0	0	0	0	0	0	0
34	DF	(Wales) WAL	Jordan Holt	2	0	2	0	0	0	0	0	0	0
37	DF	(Wales) WAL	Morgan Fox (on loan from Charlton Athletic)	7	1	6+1	1	0	0	0	0	0	0

==== Captains ====
No.	P	Name	Country	No. games	Notes
6	DF	Dean Leacock	(England)	27	Club captain
3	DF	Alan Sheehan	(Republic of Ireland)	24	

Source: Competitive match reports.
Competitive matches only
Matches started as captain only
Country: FIFA nationality; No.: Squad number; P: Position; Name: Player name; No. Games: Number of games started as captain.

==== Goalscorers ====
Rank	No.	Pos.	Name	League One	FA Cup	League Cup	League Trophy	Total
1	8	MF	Callum McGregor	12	0	1	1	14
2	19	FW	Ronan Murray	7	1	0	1	9
3	3	DF	Alan Sheehan	7	0	0	0	7
4	7	MF	Jack Grealish	5	0	0	0	5
4	16	FW	Jimmy Spencer	5	0	0	0	5
6	4	MF	Gary Liddle	4	0	0	0	4
6	9	FW	Enoch Showunmi	3	0	1	0	4
6	10	FW	Danny Haynes	3	0	1	0	4
6	15	FW	Yoann Arquin	3	0	1	0	4
6	26	DF	Haydn Hollis	4	0	0	0	4
11	20	MF	Jamal Campbell-Ryce	3	0	0	0	3
12	6	DF	Dean Leacock	1	1	0	0	2
12	~~12~~	FW	Marcus Haber	2	0	0	0	2
6	~~12~~	MF	Hayden Mullins	1	0	0	0	1
6	14	FW	Adam Coombes	0	0	1	0	1
6	~~16~~	MF	Joss Labadie	1	0	0	0	1
6	22	MF	Mark Fotheringham	1	0	0	0	1
6	~~37~~	DF	Morgan Fox	1	0	0	0	1
6	38	FW	Callum Ball	1	0	0	0	1
Total				64	2	5	2	73

==== Disciplinary record ====
No.	Pos.	Name	League One		FA Cup		League Cup		League Trophy		Total	
No.	Pos.	Name	Yellow card	Red card	Yellow card	Red card	Yellow card	Red card	Yellow card	Red card	Yellow card	Red card
1	GK	Bartosz Białkowski	1	0	0	0	0	0	0	0	1	0
2	DF	Mustapha Dumbuya	2	0	0	0	0	0	0	0	2	0
3	DF	Alan Sheehan	10	1	0	0	0	0	1	0	11	1
4	MF	Gary Liddle	3	1	0	0	0	0	0	0	3	1
5	MF	Manny Smith	3	0	0	0	1	1	1	0	5	1
6	DF	Dean Leacock	7	0	0	0	0	0	2	1	9	1
7	MF	Jack Grealish	8	0	0	0	0	0	1	0	9	0
8	MF	Callum McGregor	3	0	0	0	0	0	0	0	3	0
10	FW	Danny Haynes	3	1	0	0	0	0	0	0	3	1
~~12~~	FW	Marcus Haber	0	1	0	0	0	0	0	0	0	1
~~12~~	MF	Hayden Mullins	4	0	0	0	0	0	0	0	4	0
14	FW	Adam Coombes	2	0	0	0	0	0	0	0	2	0
~~15~~	FW	Yoann Arquin	0	0	0	0	1	0	0	0	1	0
~~16~~	MF	Joss Labadie	5	0	1	0	1	0	0	0	7	0
16	FW	Jimmy Spencer	2	1	0	0	0	0	0	0	2	1
19	FW	Ronan Murray	4	1	0	0	0	0	0	0	4	1
20	MF	Jamal Campbell-Ryce	3	0	1	0	1	0	0	0	5	0
22	MF	Mark Fotheringham	6	0	0	0	0	0	1	0	7	0
~~24~~	DF	Enda Stevens	3	0	0	0	0	0	0	0	3	0
~~24~~	DF	Kieron Freeman	1	0	0	0	0	0	0	0	1	0
24	MF	Josh Vela	1	0	0	0	0	0	0	0	1	0
25	MF	Greg Tempest	1	0	0	0	0	0	0	0	1	0
26	DF	Haydn Hollis	2	1	0	0	0	0	0	0	2	1
27	FW	Jeremy Balmy	1	0	0	0	0	0	0	0	1	0
28	MF	Andre Boucaud	9	0	0	0	0	0	0	0	9	0
29	DF	Gareth Roberts	2	0	0	0	0	0	0	0	2	0
38	FW	Callum Ball	1	0	0	0	0	0	0	0	1	0
39	FW	Nathan Tyson	1	0	0	0	0	0	0	0	1	0
Total			84	6	2	0	4	1	6	1	92	8

==== Suspensions served ====
Date	Matches Missed	Player	Reason	Opponents Missed
3 August	3	Gary Liddle	(red card) vs Sheff Utd	Fleetwood (LC), Peterborough (H), Walsall (A)
7 August	1	Manny Smith	(yellow card) (yellow-red card) vs Fleetwood	Peterborough (H)
18 October	1	Joss Labadie	5× (yellow card)	Gillingham (A)
26 October	1	Andre Boucaud	5× (yellow card)	Oldham (H)
2 November	3	Danny Haynes	(red card) vs Coventry City	Hartlepool (FA), Wolves (H), Shrewsbury (A)
26 November	3	Marcus Haber	(red card) vs Bradford City	Brentford (H), Gillingham (H)
29 December	1	Alan Sheehan	(yellow card) (yellow-red card) vs Crawley Town	Bradford City
21 January	3	Ronan Murray	(red card) vs Peterborough United	Walsall (H), Preston (A), Coventry (H)
22 February	3	Jimmy Spencer	(red card) vs Shrewsbury Town	Rotherham (A), Leyton Orient (H), MK Dons (H)
5 April	1	Haydn Hollis	(red card) vs Brentford	Port Vale (H)

=== Contracts ===
No.	Pos.	Nat.	Name	Age	Status	Contract length	Expiry date	Source
15	FW	(France)	Yoann Arquin	25	Agreed	1 year	June 2014	
26	DF	(England)	Hayden Hollis	20	Signed	3 years	June 2016	
11	MF	(Northern Ireland)	Jeff Hughes	27	Rejected	2 years	June 2015	
16	MF	(England)	Joss Labadie	22	Signed	1 year	June 2014	
25	MF	(England)	Greg Tempest	19	Signed	2 years	June 2015	
21	MF	(England)	Curtis Thompson	19	Signed	2 years	June 2015	
3	DF	(Republic of Ireland)	Alan Sheehan	26	Signed	2 years	June 2015	
17	FW	(England)	Tyrell Waite	18	Signed	2 years	June 2015	
23	GK	(Germany)	Fabian Spiess	19	Signed	Undisclosed	Undisclosed	
32	MF	(England)	Kyle Dixon	19	Signed	1 year	June 2014	
30	MF	(Scotland) (England)	Malcolm Melvin	18	Signed	6 months	June 2014	

== Transfers ==
=== In ===
No.	Pos.	Nat.	Name	Age	EU	Moving from	Type	Transfer window	Ends	Transfer fee	Source
32	MF	(England)	Kyle Dixon	18	EU	Youth system	Promoted	Summer	2014	Youth system	
33	MF	(England)	Malachi Lavelle-Moore	19	EU	Youth system	Promoted	Summer	2014	Youth system	
31	FW	(England)	Romello Nangle	18	EU	Youth system	Promoted	Summer	2014	Youth system	
30	MF	(Scotland) (England)	Malcolm Melvin	18	EU	Aston Villa	Bosman	Summer	2014	Free	
18	MF	(England)	Andy Haworth	24	EU	Rochdale	Bosman	Summer	2014	Free	
2	DF	(Sierra Leone)	Mustapha Dumbuya	25	EU	Crawley Town	Bosman	Summer	2014	Free	
10	FW	(England)	Danny Haynes	25	EU	Charlton Athletic	Bosman	Summer	2015	Free	
11	MF	(England)	David Bell	29	EU	Coventry City	Bosman	Summer	2014	Free	
22	MF	(Scotland)	Mark Fotheringham	29	EU	Ross County (Scotland)	Bosman	Summer	2014	Free	
14	FW	(England)	Adam Coombes	22	EU	Chelsea	Bosman	Summer	2014	Free	
27	FW	(France)	Jeremy Balmy	19	EU	Le Havre (France)	Bosman	Summer	2014	Free	
29	DF	(England)	Callum Bennett	20	EU	Stoke City	Bosman	Summer	2014	Free	
34	DF	(Wales)	Jordan Holt	19	EU	St Mirren (Scotland)	Bosman	Summer	2014	Free	
19	FW	(Republic of Ireland)	Ronan Murray	21	EU	Ipswich Town	Bosman	Summer	2014	Free	
29	DF	(Wales)	Gareth Roberts	35	EU	Bury	Bosman	Winter	2014	Free	
16	FW	(England)	Jimmy Spencer	22	EU	Huddersfield Town	Bosman	Winter	2014	Free	

=== Loans in ===
No.	Pos.	Name	Country	Age	Loan club	Started	Ended	Start source	End source
8	MF	Callum McGregor	(Scotland)	20	Celtic	7 August	1 January		
24	DF	Enda Stevens	(Republic of Ireland)	23	Aston Villa	27 August	17 September		
12	FW	Marcus Haber	(Canada)	25	Stevenage	13 September	27 November		
7	MF	Jack Grealish	(Republic of Ireland) (England)	18	Aston Villa	13 September	End of Season		
24	DF	Kieron Freeman	(England)	21	Derby County	12 November	24 December		
38	FW	Callum Ball	(England)	21	Derby County	28 November	End of Season		
37	DF	Morgan Fox	(Wales)	20	Charlton Athletic	28 November	4 January		
—	MF	Bradley Jordan	(England)	19	Charlton Athletic	28 November	4 January		
24	DF	Kieron Freeman	(England)	21	Derby County	11 January	3 March		
15	FW	Kwesi Appiah	(England)	23	Crystal Palace	21 January	24 March		
8	MF	Callum McGregor	(Scotland)	20	Celtic	24 January	End of Season		
12	MF	Hayden Mullins	(England)	35	Birmingham City	31 January	29 April		
39	FW	Nathan Tyson	(England)	32	Blackpool	2 March	End of Season		
24	MF	Josh Vela	(England)	20	Bolton Wanderers	21 March	End of Season		

Sources: For loan start source see "Start source". For loan end source see "End source".
EU = if holds or not a European Union passport; Country: when 2 flags, 1st flag = country that plays for internationally, 2nd flag = country of birth; No. = number on jersey; P = Position (for position name, pause mouse pointer on abbreviation); Name = Name on jersey (for more extensive name, pause mouse pointer on name); In/Out = In: The player came in on loan, Out: The player went out on loan; Loan club = the club that the player moved on loan to or the club that the player came from on loan; Started = the date when the player's loan started; Ended = the date when the player's loan ended.

=== Out ===
No.	Pos.	Name	Country	Age	Type	Moving to	Transfer window	Transfer fee	Apps	Goals	Source
18	MF	Hamza Bencherif	(Algeria) (France)	25	Contract Ended	Plymouth Argyle	Summer	Free	40	2	
10	MF	Alan Judge	(Republic of Ireland)	24	Contract Ended	Blackburn Rovers	Summer	Free	115	18	
2	DF	Julian Kelly	(England)	29	Contract Ended	Free agent	Summer	Free	62	4	
12	GK	Liam Mitchell	(England)	20	Contract Ended	Mansfield Town	Summer	Free	1	0	
24	MF	Jake Wholey	(England)	19	Contract Ended	Free agent	Summer	Free	2	0	
11	MF	Jeff Hughes	(Northern Ireland)	28	Contract Ended	Fleetwood Town	Summer	Free	98	26	
22	DF	Krystian Pearce	(England)	23	Contract Ended	Torquay United	Summer	Free	69	2	
14	MF	Gavin Mahon	(England)	36	Contract Ended	Portsmouth	Summer	Free	49	0	
4	MF	Neal Bishop	(England)	31	Contract Terminated	Blackpool	Summer	Free	194	12	
13	FW	François Zoko	(Ivory Coast)	29	Contract Terminated	Stevenage	Summer	Free	44	8	
18	MF	Andy Haworth	(England)	25	Contract Terminated	Tamworth	Winter	Free	3	0	
15	FW	Yoann Arquin	(France)	25	Contract Terminated	Ross County (Scotland)	Winter	Free	64	13	
29	MF	Callum Bennett	(England)	19	Contract Ended	Free agent	Winter	Free	0	0	
34	DF	Jordan Holt	(Wales)	19	Contract Ended	Gateshead	Winter	Free	2	0	
11	MF	David Bell	(England)	30	Contract Terminated	King's Lynn Town	Winter	Free	13	0	
16	MF	Joss Labadie	(England)	23	Contract Terminated	Torquay United	Winter	Free	50	3	

EU = if holds or not a European Union passport; Country: when 2 flags, 1st flag = country that plays for internationally, 2nd flag = country of birth; N = number on jersey; P = Position (for position name, pause mouse pointer on abbreviation); Name = Name on jersey (for more extensive name, pause mouse pointer on name); Age = age on the day of the signing; Moving from = only indicate the club the player was playing before start playing for this club in this season, for the type of the moving see Status column; Moving to = only indicates the club the player is going to play next, for the type of the moving see Status column; Ends = when the player's current contract ends; n/a = Not applicable; Apps = Total number of competitive appearances (including substitute appearances) at the club prior to departure; Goals = Total number of competitive goals scored at the club prior to departure.

=== Loans out ===
No.	Pos.	Name	Country	Age	Loan club	Started	Ended	Start source	End source
18	MF	Andy Haworth	(England)	25	Tamworth	28 November	1 January		
32	MF	Kyle Dixon	(England)	19	Grantham Town	13 December	11 January		
33	FW	Malachi Lavelle-Moore	(England)	19	Grantham Town	13 December	11 January		
17	FW	Tyrell Waite	(England)	19	Ilkeston	13 December	11 January		
16	MF	Joss Labadie	(England)	23	Torquay United	3 January	30 January		
32	MF	Kyle Dixon	(England)	19	Boston United	13 January	9 February		
10	FW	Danny Haynes	(England)	26	Hibernian	29 January	End of Season		
9	FW	Enoch Showunmi	(Nigeria) (England)	31	Torquay United	28 February	25 March		
9	FW	Enoch Showunmi	(Nigeria) (England)	32	Plymouth Argyle	27 March	End of Season		
31	FW	Romello Nangle	(England)	19	Whitehawk	28 March	26 April		

Sources: For loan start source see "Start source". For loan end source see "End source".
EU = if holds or not a European Union passport; Country: when 2 flags, 1st flag = country that plays for internationally, 2nd flag = country of birth; No. = number on jersey; P = Position (for position name, pause mouse pointer on abbreviation); Name = Name on jersey (for more extensive name, pause mouse pointer on name); In/Out = In: The player came in on loan, Out: The player went out on loan; Loan club = the club that the player moved on loan to or the club that the player came from on loan; Started = the date when the player's loan started; Ended = the date when the player's loan ended.

== Fixtures & results ==
=== Friendlies ===
2 July 2013	Steaua București	2–0	Notts County	Burton upon Trent
16:00 BST	Latovlevici 4'; Costea 61'	Report		Stadium: St George's Park National Football Centre; Attendance: 0

4 July 2013	Palloseura Kemi Kings	1–3	Notts County	Kemi
16:40 BST	Lee Jae-Yun 58'	Report	Leacock 3', 13'; Haworth 52'	Stadium: Sauvosaari

7 July 2013	Tervarit	1–4	Notts County	Oulu
15:00 BST	90'	Report	Nangle 6'; Trialist 9'; Waite 61'; Trialist 78'

10 July 2013	JJK Jyväskylä	0–2	Notts County	Jyväskylä
16:30 BST		Report	Zoko 39' (pen.); Showunmi 55'	Stadium: Harjun stadion

16 July 2013	Notts County	1–2	Galatasaray	Nottingham
19:30 BST	Showunmi 36'	Report	Yılmaz 80'; Sneijder 90'	Stadium: Meadow Lane; Attendance: 5,377

23 July 2013	Notts County	2–2	Rayo Vallecano	Nottingham
19:30 BST	Sheehan 45'; Arquin 81'	Report	González 59', 62'	Stadium: Meadow Lane; Attendance: 1,066

27 July 2013	Notts County	3–3	Ipswich Town	Nottingham
15:00 BST	Haynes 35'; Phillip; Arquin	Report	15' Hyam; 23' Murphy; 57' Taylor	Stadium: Meadow Lane; Attendance: 1,532

=== League One ===
3 August 1	Sheffield United	2-1	Notts County	Sheffield
15:00 BST	McDonald 30'; Maguire 67'	Report	Showunmi 59'	Stadium: Brammall Lane; Attendance: 17,944; Referee: Keith Stroud

10 August 2	Notts County	2–4	Peterborough United	Nottingham
15:00 BST	Leacock 26'; Arquin 90' (pen.)	Report	30' Rowe; 54' Barnett; 58' (pen.) McCann; 71' Assombalonga	Stadium: Meadow Lane; Attendance: 6,582; Referee: Scott Duncan

17 August 3	Walsall	1–1	Notts County	Walsall
15:00 BST	Sawyers 50'	Report	74' Arquin	Stadium: Bescot Stadium; Attendance: 4,295; Referee: Williamson

24 August 4	Notts County	0–1	Stevenage	Nottingham
15:00 BST		Report	90' Dunne	Stadium: Meadow Lane; Attendance: 3,925; Referee: Kettle

31 August 5	Notts County	0–1	Rotherham United	Nottingham
15:00 BST		Report	37' Agard	Stadium: Meadow Lane; Attendance: 5,428; Referee: Boyeson

14 September 6	Milton Keynes Dons	3–1	Notts County	Milton Keynes
15:00 BST	Chadwick 5'; Williams 37'; Bamford 90'	Report	76' McGregor	Stadium: Stadium:mk; Attendance: 7,142; Referee: Mathieson

17 September 7	Leyton Orient	5–1	Notts County	London
19:45 BST	Lisbie 28', 45'; Cox 56'; Batt 80'; Stockley 84'	Report	71' Haynes	Stadium: Matchroom Stadium; Attendance: 4,092; Referee: Lewis

21 September 8	Notts County	2–0	Tranmere Rovers	Nottingham
15:00 BST	Labadie 7'; Haber 79'	Report		Stadium: Meadow Lane; Attendance: 3,938; Referee: Seb Stockbridge

28 September 9	Carlisle United	2–1	Notts County	Carlisle
15:00 BST	Robson 41'; Amoo 54'	Report	27' McGregor	Stadium: Burton Lane; Attendance: 4,315; Referee: Ilderton

5 October 10	Notts County	4–0	Crewe Alexandra	Nottingham
15:00 BST	McGregor 33', 41'; Haynes 66'; Haber 83'	Report		Stadium: Meadow Lane; Attendance: 1,249; Referee: Phil Gibbs

18 October 11	Swindon Town	2–0	Notts County	Swindon
19:45 BST	Ranger 11'; N'Guessan 28' (pen.)	Report		Stadium: County Ground; Attendance: 8,188; Referee: Darren Deadman

22 October 12	Gillingham	2–1	Notts County	Gillingham
19:45 BST	Whelpdale 24'; Kedwell 29'	Report	79' McGregor	Stadium: Priestfield Stadium; Attendance: 5,161; Referee: David Phillips

26 October 13	Notts County	0–1	Preston North End	Nottingham
15:00 BST		Report	74' Hume	Stadium: Meadow Lane; Attendance: 4,956; Referee: Scott Mathieson

29 October 14	Notts County	3–2	Oldham Athletic	Nottingham
19:45 BST	Haynes 20'; Arquin 60'; McGregor 68'	Report	45' Rooney; 70' Clarke-Harris	Stadium: Meadow Lane; Attendance: 3,385; Referee: Gavin Ward

2 November 15	Coventry City	3–0	Notts County	Northampton
15:00 BST	Clarke 47', 58'; Wilson 64'	Report	(red card) 45' Haynes	Stadium: Sixfields Stadium; Attendance: 2,693; Referee: Lee Collins

16 November 16	Notts County	0–1	Wolverhampton Wanderers	Nottingham
15:00 BST	McGregor (yellow card) 58'; Fotheringham (yellow card) 64'; Freeman (yellow card) 66'	Summary	Batth (yellow card) 22'; Davis (yellow card) 33'; Ebanks-Landell 76'	Stadium: Meadow Lane; Attendance: 7,520; Referee: David Webb

23 November 17	Shrewsbury Town	1–0	Notts County	Shrewsbury
15:00 BST	Reach 73'	Summary	Boucaud (yellow card) 31'	Stadium: New Meadow; Attendance: 5,008; Referee: Darren Bond

26 November 18	Bradford City	1–1	Notts County	Bradford
19:45 BST	Yeates 69'	Summary	Liddle 43' (yellow card) 90+4'; Białkowski (yellow card) 45+2'; Freeman (yellow card) 75'; Haber (red card) 89'; Campbell-Ryce (yellow card) 90+1'	Stadium: Valley Parade; Attendance: 12,808; Referee: Trevor Kettle

30 November 19	Notts County	0–1	Brentford	Nottingham
15:00 GMT		Report	44' Grigg	Stadium: Meadow Lane; Attendance: 5,132; Referee: Nigel Miller

7 December 20	Notts County	3–1	Gillingham	Nottingham
15:00 GMT	McGregor 40', 53'; Grealish 87'	Report	47' Dack	Stadium: Meadow Lane; Attendance: 3,607; Referee: Jeremy Simpson

14 December 21	Colchester United	0–4	Notts County	Colchester
15:00 GMT		Report	30' Grealish; 43' Fox; 86' McGregor; 89' Liddle	Stadium: Colchester Community Stadium; Attendance: 2,961; Referee: Simon Hooper

21 December 22	Notts County	1–1	Bristol City	Nottingham
15:00 GMT	Sheehan 89' (pen.)	Report	41' (pen.) Baldock	Stadium: Meadow Lane; Attendance: 6,523; Referee: Charles Breakspear

26 December 23	Port Vale	2–1	Notts County	Stoke-on-Trent
15:00 GMT	Myrie-Williams 24' (pen.); Tomlin 79' (pen.)		43' Murray	Stadium: Vale Park; Attendance: 7,028; Referee: Oliver Langford

29 December 24	Crawley Town	1–0	Notts County	Crawley
15:00 GMT	Connolly 54'		(yellow card) 59' (yellow-red card) 79' Sheehan	Stadium: Broadfield Stadium; Attendance: 3,096; Referee: Mark Brown

1 January 25	Notts County	3–0	Bradford City	Nottingham
15:00 GMT	Campbell-Ryce 32'; McGregor 88'; Grealish 90'			Stadium: Meadow Lane; Attendance: 4,919; Referee: Richard Clark

11 January 26	Notts County	2–1	Sheffield United	Nottingham
15:00 GMT	Showunmi 26'; Fotheringham 68'		2' Coady	Stadium: Meadow Lane; Attendance: 8,564; Referee: Kevin Wright

18 January 27	Stevenage	0–1	Notts County	Stevenage
15:00 GMT		Report	42' Ball	Stadium: Broadhall Way; Attendance: 2,877; Referee: Mark Haywood

21 January 28	Peterborough United	4–3	Notts County	Peterborough
19:45 GMT	Ajose 30', 74', 85'; Assombalonga 54'	Report	4' Showunmi; 7' (red card) 16' Murray; 76' Grealish	Stadium: London Road Stadium; Attendance: 4,511; Referee: Dean Whitestone

25 January 29	Notts County	1–5	Walsall	Nottingham
15:00 GMT	McGregor 61'	Report	24', 33', 45' Butler; 49' Butler; 53' Westcarr	Stadium: Meadow Lane; Attendance: 5,701; Referee: Darren Sheldrake

1 February 30	Preston North End	2–0	Notts County	Preston
15:00 GMT	C Davies 65'; Garner 71' (pen.)	Report		Stadium: Deepdale; Attendance: 9,483; Referee: Tony Harrington

8 February 31	Notts County	3–0	Coventry City	Nottingham
15:00 GMT	Mullins 13'; Spencer 33'; Sheehan 87' (pen.)	Report		Stadium: Meadow Lane; Attendance: 8,149; Referee: Carl Berry

15 February 32	Wolverhampton Wanderers	2–0	Notts County	Wolverhampton
15:00 GMT	Jacobs 17', 54'	Report		Stadium: Molineux Stadium; Attendance: 18,019; Referee: Jeremy Simpson

22 February 33	Notts County	2–3	Shrewsbury Town	Nottingham
15:00 GMT	Grealish 8'; Sheehan 13' (pen.); Spencer (red card) 44'	Report	32', 67' Taylor; 70' McAllister	Stadium: Meadow Lane; Attendance: 5,424; Referee: Seb Stockbridge

1 March 34	Rotherham United	6–0	Notts County	Rotherham
15:00 GMT	Tavernier 12'; Vučkić 16', 60'; Revell 26'; Agard 29'; Hitchcock 83'	Report		Stadium: New York Stadium; Attendance: 8,383; Referee: Tim Robinson

8 March 35	Notts County	0–0	Leyton Orient	Nottingham
15:00 GMT		Report		Stadium: Meadow Lane; Attendance: 4,680; Referee: Graham Salisbury

11 March 36	Notts County	1–3	Milton Keynes Dons	Nottingham
19:45 GMT	Sheehan 70' (pen.)	Report	3', 55', 90' Alli	Stadium: Meadow Lane; Attendance: 3,331; Referee: Geoff Eltringham

15 March 37	Tranmere Rovers	3–2	Notts County	Tranmere
15:00 GMT	Koumas 25'; Lowe 28'; Jennings 84'	Report	14' Murray; 61' Sheehan	Stadium: Prenton Park; Attendance: 4,292; Referee: Keith Stroud

22 March 38	Notts County	4–1	Carlisle United	Nottingham
15:00 GMT	Hollis 33', 47'; Murray 40'; Liddle 70'	Report	57' Berrett	Stadium: Meadow Lane; Attendance: 4,014; Referee: Graham Scott

25 March 39	Crewe Alexandra	1–3	Notts County	Crewe
19:45 GMT	Ellis 90'	Report	10' Liddle; 79', 87' Murray	Stadium: Alexandra Stadium; Attendance: 3,895; Referee: Seb Stockbridge

29 March 40	Notts County	2–0	Colchester United	Nottingham
15:00 GMT	Murray 5'; Hollis 45'	Report		Stadium: Meadow Lane; Attendance: 5,230; Referee: Lee Collins

5 April 41	Brentford	3–1	Notts County	London
15:00 BST	Forshaw 32' (pen.); Judge 43', 52'	Report	(red card) 32' Hollis; 84' Spencer	Stadium: Griffin Park; Attendance: 8,188; Referee: Charles Breakspear

12 April 42	Notts County	4–2	Port Vale	Nottingham
15:00 BST	Spencer 27', 34'; Campbell-Ryce 48', 85'	Report	13' (o.g.) Thompson; 25' Tomlin	Stadium: Meadow Lane; Attendance: 5,613; Referee: Darren Drysdale

18 April 43	Bristol City	2–1	Notts County	Bristol
15:00 BST	Baldock 13', 86'	Report	29' Hollis	Stadium: Ashton Gate Stadium; Attendance: 13,427; Referee: Paul Tierney

21 April 43	Notts County	1–0	Crawley Town	Nottingham
15:00 BST	Spencer 34'	Report		Stadium: Meadow Lane; Attendance: 7,111; Referee: Carl Boyeson

26 April 45	Notts County	2–0	Swindon Town	Nottingham
15:00 BST	Sheehan 9'; McGregor 90'	Report	(yellow card) 24' (yellow-red card) 90+2' N Thompson; (red card) 90+1' Archibald-Henville	Stadium: Meadow Lane; Attendance: 6,714; Referee: Richard Clark

3 May 46	Oldham Athletic	1–1	Notts County	Oldham
15:00 BST	Lockwood 68' (yellow card) 75' (yellow-red card) 78'	Report	75' (pen.) Sheehan	Stadium: Boundary Park; Attendance: 7,698; Referee: Fred Graham

=== FA Cup ===
9 November Round 1	Hartlepool United	3–2	Notts County	Hartlepool
19:45 GMT		Report		Stadium: Victoria Park; Attendance: 3,313

=== League Cup ===
7 August Round 1	Notts County	3–2	Fleetwood Town	Nottingham
19:45 BST	Showunmi 28'; Haynes 40'; McGregor 73'; Smith (yellow card) 83' (yellow-red card)	Report	16' Evans; 88' Ball	Stadium: Meadow Lane; Attendance: 2,115; Referee: Hill

27 August Round 2	Liverpool	4–2 (a.e.t.)	Notts County	Liverpool
19:45 BST	Sterling 4'; Sturridge 29', 105'; Henderson 110'	Report	62' Arquin; 84' Coombes	Stadium: Anfield

=== League Trophy ===
3 September Round 1	Notts County	1–0	Burton Albion	Nottingham
19:45 BST	McGregor 40'	Report		Stadium: Meadow Lane; Attendance: 1,240; Referee: David Bond

8 October Round 2	Wolverhampton Wanderers	0–0 (a.e.t.) (1–3 p)	Notts County	Wolverhampton
19:45 BST		Report		Stadium: Molineux Stadium; Attendance: 7,166; Referee: Andy D'Urso

12 November Round 3	Oldham Athletic	5–1	Notts County	Oldham
19:45 GMT		Report	13' Murray	Stadium: Boundary Park; Attendance: 2,646

== Overall summary ==
=== Summary ===
Games played	52 (46 League One, 1 FA Cup, 2 League Cup, 3 League Trophy)
Games won	17 (15 League One, 0 FA Cup, 1 League Cup, 1 League Trophy)
Games drawn	6 (5 League One, 0 FA Cup, 0 League Cup, 1 League Trophy)
Games lost	29 (26 League One, 1 FA Cup, 1 League Cup, 1 League Trophy)
Goals scored	73 (64 League One, 2 FA Cup, 5 League Cup, 2 League Trophy)
Goals conceded	91 (77 League One, 3 FA Cup, 6 League Cup, 5 League Trophy)
Goal difference	-18
Clean sheets	11 (9 League One, 0 FA Cup, 0 League Cup, 2 League Trophy)
Yellow cards	92 (84 League One, 2 FA Cup, 4 League Cup, 2 League Trophy)
Red cards	8 (6 League One, 0 FA Cup, 1 League Cup, 0 League Trophy)
Worst discipline	Alan Sheehan (11 (yellow card) , 1 (red card) )
Best result	4–0 vs Crewe Alexandra, 4–0 vs Colchester United
Worst result	0–6 vs Rotherham United
Most appearances	Bartosz Białkowski (48)
Top scorer	Callum McGregor (14)
Points	50

=== Score overview ===
Opposition	Home score	Away score	Double
Bradford City	3–0	1–1	No
Brentford	0–1	1–3	No
Bristol City	1–1	1–2	No
Carlisle United	4–1	1–2	No
Colchester United	2–0	4–0	Yes
Coventry City	3–0	0–3	No
Crawley Town	1–0	0–1	No
Crewe Alexandra	4–0	3–1	Yes
Gillingham	3–1	1–2	No
Leyton Orient	0–0	1–5	No
Milton Keynes Dons	1–3	1–3	No
Oldham Athletic	3–2	1–1	No
Peterborough United	2–4	3–4	No
Port Vale	4–2	1–2	No
Preston North End	0–1	0–2	No
Rotherham United	0–1	0–6	No
Sheffield United	2–1	1–2	No
Shrewsbury Town	2–3	0–1	No
Stevenage	0–1	1–0	No
Swindon Town	2–0	0–2	No
Tranmere Rovers	2–0	2–3	No
Walsall	1–5	1–1	No
Wolverhampton Wanderers	0–1	0–2	No
