= Greg Tempest =

Northern Irish footballer (born 1993)

Personal information
- Full name: Gregory Tempest
- Date of birth: 28 December 1993 (age 32)
- Place of birth: Nottingham, England
- Height: 1.82 m (5 ft 11 1/2 in)
- Positions: Midfielder; defender

Team information
- Current team: Rugby Town

Youth career
- 2010–2012: Notts County

Senior career*
Years	Team	Apps	(Gls)
2012–2015	Notts County	22	(0)
2012	→ Ilkeston (loan)	5	(0)
2014–2015	→ Boston United (loan)	25	(1)
2015–2016	Lincoln City	28	(0)
2016–2017	Nuneaton Town	35	(1)
2017	→ Gainsborough Trinity (loan)	5	(0)
2018–2019	Basford United	32	(1)
2019	Matlock Town	13	(0)
2019	Grantham Town	0	(0)
2020–2023	Gedling Miners Welfare	59	(17)
2022	→ Belper Town (dual reg)	15	(0)
2023	→ Quorn (loan)	1	(0)
2023–	Carlton Town	55	(1)
2025–	Rugby Town	7	(0)

International career
2013	Northern Ireland U21	6	(0)
- * Club domestic league appearances and goals as of 11:36, 26 June 2024 (UTC)

Gregory Tempest (born 28 December 1993) is a Northern Irish professional footballer who plays as a midfielder for Rugby Town.

== Club career ==
=== Notts County ===
Born in Nottingham, England, Tempest started his career at Notts County when he was sixteen and was featured in the club's first team during pre-season. He signed his first professional contract with the club the following year. Ahead of the 2012–13 season, Tempest was given number twenty-five shirt.

On 9 November 2012, Tempest joined Ilkeston on a month loan and made his debut against United of Manchester. He returned to his parent club after a stint at Ilkeston despite keen of extension.

Upon his return, Tempest made his debut against Scunthorpe United coming on as an 82nd-minute substitute. After making three appearances in his first season, he was offered a new contract by the club, which he signed a two-year contract weeks after being offered.

The 2013–14 season saw Tempest make fourteen appearances for the club under the management of Chris Kiwomya and Shaun Derry. During the season, he provided two assists: one was against Crewe Alexandra, in a 4–0 win on 5 October 2013 and another was against Oldham Athletic on 29 October 2013.

On 26 September 2014, Tempest joined Boston United on loan for a month. He then had his loan at Boston United extended until 27 December 2014. He made his return to his parent club after making fourteen appearances and scoring once against Lowestoft Town for Boston United. Shortly after, Tempest re-joined Boston United for the second time, until the end of the season.

After five years at Notts County, Tempest was released by the club.

=== Lincoln City ===
Tempest joined Lincoln City on a one-year contract on 14 May 2015.

=== Later career ===
After being released by Lincoln City, Tempest joined Nuneaton Town. On 10 March 2017 he joined Gainsborough Trinity on loan until the end of the 16/17 season. He was released by Nuneaton in May 2017.

After missing the following season through injury, Tempest joined Basford United in August 2018. He signed for Matlock Town on 9 January 2019.

On 23 May 2019, Tempest signed for Grantham Town, before taking a break from the game for personal reasons.

In 2020, Tempest signed for Gedling Miners Welfare.

On 17 June 2022, Tempest joined Belper Town.

In May 2023, Tempest joined Carlton Town.

In October 2025, Tempest joined Rugby Town.

== International career ==
Tempest was eligible to play for Northern Ireland through his late grandfather, Bill Corkhill, though he never met his grandfather. In May 2013, Tempest was called up by Northern Ireland U21. He made his Northern Ireland U21 debut on 30 May 2013, in a 3–0 loss against Cyprus U21. His performance in a 1–0 win against Cyprus U21 on 19 November 2013 soon earned him 'Man of the Match'.

== Career statistics ==
As of end of 2022–23 season

Appearances and goals by club, season and competition
Club	Season	League			FA Cup		League Cup		Other		Total	
Club	Season	Division	Apps	Goals	Apps	Goals	Apps	Goals	Apps	Goals	Apps	Goals
Notts County	2012–13	League One	3	0	0	0	0	0	0	0	3	0
Notts County	2013–14	League One	14	0	0	0	1	0	0	0	15	0
Notts County	2014–15	League One	0	0	0	0	0	0	0	0	0	0
Notts County	Total		17	0	0	0	1	0	0	0	22	0
Ilkeston (loan)	2012–13	Northern Premier League Premier Division	5	0	0	0	—		0	0	5	0
Boston United (loan)	2014–15	Conference North	25	1	1	0	—		3 (Note: Appearances in FA Trophy)	0	16	1
Lincoln City	2015–16	National League	28	0	3	0	—		1	0	24	0
Nuneaton Town	2016–17	National League North	35	1	0	0	—		3	0	25	1
Gainsborough Trinity (loan)	2016–17	National League North	5	0	0	0	—		0	0	5	0
Basford United	2018–19	Northern Premier League Premier Division	35	1	1	0	—		6 (Note: Four appearances in FA Trophy; two appearances in Northern Premier League Challenge Cup)	0	26	1
Matlock Town	2018–19	Northern Premier League Premier Division	13	0	0	0	—		1 (Note: Appearances in Derbyshire Senior Cup)	0	14	0
Grantham Town	2019–20	Northern Premier League Premier Division	0	0	0	0	—		0	0	0	0
Gedling Miners Welfare	2020–21	East Midlands Counties League	5	2	—		—		1 (Note: Appearances in FA Vase)	0	6	2
Gedling Miners Welfare	2021–22	United Counties League Division One	37	13	—		—		1	0	38	13
Gedling Miners Welfare	2022–23	United Counties League Division One	17	2	—		—		1 (Note: Appearances in Nottinghamshire Senior Cup)	0	18	2
Gedling Miners Welfare	Total		59	17	—		—		3	0	62	17
Belper Town (dual reg)	2022–23	Northern Premier League Premier Division	9	0	0	0	—		1	0	10	0
Quorn (loan)	2022–23	United Counties League Premier Division North	1	0	0	0	—		0	0	1	0
Career total			383	20	5	0	1	0	18	0	405	20
