= Tyrell Waite =

English association football player

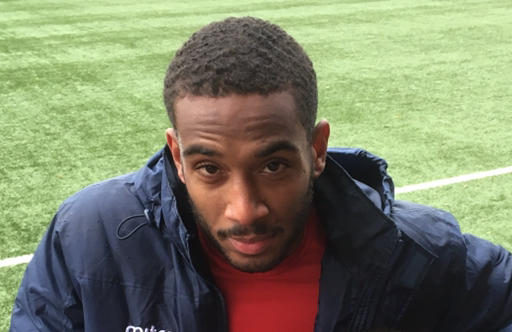
- Waite in October 2019

Personal information
- Full name: Tyrell Michael Nathaniel Waite
- Date of birth: 1 July 1994 (age 32)
- Place of birth: Derby, England
- Height: 1.80 m (5 ft 11 in)
- Position: Forward

Team information
- Current team: Rugby Borough

Youth career
- Ilkeston

Senior career*
Years	Team	Apps	(Gls)
2011–2012	Ilkeston	29	(4)
2012–2015	Notts County	9	(1)
2012	→ Nuneaton Town (loan)	5	(0)
2013–2014	→ Ilkeston (loan)	11	(6)
2014	→ Nuneaton Town (loan)	3	(0)
2014	→ Ilkeston (loan)	7	(0)
2014–2015	→ Lincoln City (loan)	3	(0)
2015	Lincoln City	3	(0)
2015–2016	Skellefteå	15	(9)
2016	Nuneaton Town	9	(1)
2016–2017	Kidderminster Harriers	38	(5)
2017–2018	Boston United	8	(0)
2017	→ Matlock Town (loan)	8	(2)
2018	→ Stafford Rangers (loan)	10	(0)
2018–2021	Tamworth	85	(24)
2021–2022	Coalville Town	19	(4)
2022–2024	Nuneaton Borough	37	(4)
2024	Mickleover	15	(5)
2024–2025	Basford United	19	(2)
2025–2026	Barwell	39	(5)
2026–	Rugby Borough		
- * Club domestic league appearances and goals as of 00:00, 31 December 2025 (UTC)

Tyrell Michael Nathaniel Waite (born 1 July 1994) is an English footballer who plays for Northern Premier League Division One Midlands club Rugby Borough, where he plays as a forward.

== Playing career ==
=== Ilkeston ===
Waite came through the Ilkeston youth academy, scored the club's first ever competitive goal, and signed a two-year professional contract with the Northern Premier League Division One South club in March 2012.

=== Notts County ===
Later in that month he was signed by League One club Notts County, after impressing manager Keith Curle during a two-week trial. He made his debut for the club on 21 August 2012, replacing Lee Hughes 88 minutes into a 2–0 win over Hartlepool United at Meadow Lane. Goals from Francois Zoko and Neal Bishop maintained Notts County's 100% start to the League One season with a victory over Hartlepool. Waite scored his first goal for the club on the last day on the 2012–13 season, heading in the opening goal against Coventry.

=== Nuneaton Town (loan) ===
Waite joined Nuneaton Town on a one-month loan on 20 October 2012. On 22 August 2014, Tyrell was again loaned out to Nuneaton Town on a month's loan.

=== Ilkeston (loan) ===
He linked up with Ilkeston for a third time, joining the club on a loan basis on 3 October 2014 and debuting the following day as a 69th-minute substitute for Rob Duffy in the club's 2-1 Northern Premier League home victory over Rushall Olympic.

=== Lincoln City (loan) ===
His third move of the season came on 27 November 2014 when he joined Lincoln City on a loan basis until 4 January 2015.

=== Lincoln City ===
Waite returned to Notts County, and the club agreed to cancel his contract so that, on 16 January 2015, he was able to join Lincoln City on a permanent basis, agreeing a contract until the end of the 2014–15 season. After a total of just six first team appearances during his two spells with the club, he was released from his contract with the club, his departure being announced on 11 March 2015.

=== Skellefteå ===
On the same day, it was revealed that he had signed a two-year deal with Swedish Football Division 2 side Skellefteå FF.

=== Stafford Rangers (loan) ===
Tyrell was loaned to Northern Premier League Premier Division side Stafford Rangers on 18 January 2018, for the remainder of the season.

=== Tamworth ===
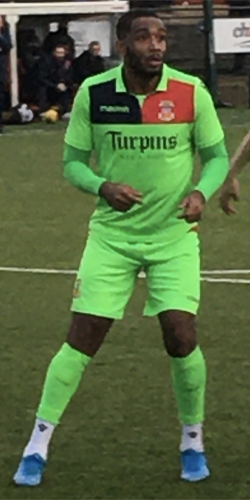
Waite playing for Tamworth in February 2020.

On 25 July 2018, Waite was announced as a Tamworth player. He signed for the newly relegated Southern League Premier Central side on a one-year contract following some impressive displays whilst on trial in pre-season. He made his debut for the club on 11 August 2018, in a 1–0 away defeat to St Ives Town. Waite had a chance to score his first goal for the club the following match against Alvechurch on 14 August 2018, at home, but saw has his 77th minute effort saved to deny Tamworth the three points. He scored his first goal for Tamworth on 31 August 2019, in an away fixture against AFC Rushden & Diamonds, netting the second goal in a 2–2 draw.

On New Year's Day 2019, and with Tamworth under the stewardship of manager Dennis Greene they welcomed Barwell to The Lamb Ground, with the game at 3–2 in the favour of Tamworth, Waite came on as a 63rd-minute substitute for Jack Concannon, however 7 minutes later he was given a straight red card for a foul on Reece Blackmore. The game finishing 3-3, with Tamworth conceding a 95th-minute equaliser.

Following on from a three match suspension, Waite was included in the squad for a Staffordshire FA Senior Cup tie on 15 January 2019, away at Kidsgrove Athletic, which they were defeated heavily 6–0, Waite's Tamworth career looked to be hanging in the balance and he was subsequently left out of the squad for the next match, away at Biggleswade Town on 19 January 2019, which turned out to be the last match for manager Greene, who was relieved of his duties the following day.

Waite was recalled to the squad for Gary Smith and Andrew Danylyszyn's first game in charge on 26 January 2019, against Bedworth United, the game which finished 2-2, with Waite managing to play the full match on his return to the squad.

Waite did however prove his worth and repaid the faith shown in him by Smith and Danylyszyn, as two weeks in a row, he was the match winner, scoring late in league matches. He scored a 90th-minute winner in a 2–1 victory away at Coalville Town on 16 February 2019, and Waite was at it again a week later on 23 February 2019, when he scored the only goal of the game, an 89th-minute winner against high flying Stourbridge.

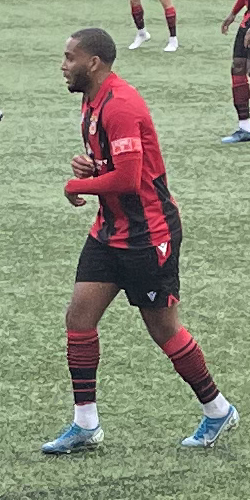
Waite playing for Tamworth in August 2021.

Waite made a total of 39 appearances, and scored 11 goals for Tamworth, during the 2018–19 season, as the club finished in 12th position in their first season in the division.

On 2 June 2019, Tamworth confirmed that Waite, along with midfielder Chris Spencer had signed new one-year contracts to remain with the club for the 2019–20 season. Waite came on as a 65th-minute substitute for Ahmed Obeng on the opening day of the season, as Tamworth drew 1–1 away at St Ives Town on 10 August 2019.

Tamworth confirmed that Tyrell had committed to the club for a third season on 2 July 2020, becoming the sixth player to agree terms with the club.

Waite signed for Tamworth for a fourth season on 6 June 2021.

Tyrell scored a brace on 12 October 2021 in a home Southern League Premier Division Central fixture against Stourbridge, scoring on the 40th minute and the 73rd minute to secure a 4–0 victory for Tamworth.

=== Coalville Town ===
On 23 December 2021, Waite signed for Southern League Premier Central rivals Coalville Town ending his four-year association with Tamworth.

=== Nuneaton Borough ===
Waite returned to former club Nuneaton Borough in June 2022.

=== Mickleover ===
Tyrell signed for Mickleover on 1 February 2024.

=== Basford United ===
In May 2024, Waite joined Basford United. He departed the club by mutual consent in January 2025.

=== Barwell ===
Waite signed for Southern League Premier Central side Barwell in January 2025. He signed a one-year contract with the club on 7 July 2025.

=== Rugby Borough ===
On 31 January 2026, Rugby Borough confirmed the signing of Waite, along with Lathaniel Rowe-Turner and Gary Stohrer.

== Career statistics ==
=== Club ===
As of end of 2021–22 season.

Appearances and goals by club, season and competition
Club	Season	League			National Cup		Other		Total	
Club	Season	Division	Apps	Goals	Apps	Goals	Apps	Goals	Apps	Goals
Ilkeston	2011–12	Northern Premier League Division One South	29	4	—		6 (Note: Four appearances in FA Trophy; one appearance one goal in Northern Premier League Challenge Cup; one appearance one goal in Derbyshire Senior Cup)	2	35	6
Notts County	2011–12	League One	0	0	0	0	0	0	0	0
Notts County	2012–13	League One	8	1	0	0	0	0	8	1
Notts County	2013–14	League One	1	0	0	0	0	0	1	0
Notts County	2014–15	League One	0	0	0	0	0	0	0	0
Notts County	Total		9	1	0	0	0	0	9	1
Nuneaton Town (loan)	2012–13	Football Conference	5	0	4	2	1 (Note: Appearance(s) in FA Trophy)	0	10	2
Ilkeston (loan)	2013–14	Northern Premier League Premier Division	11	6	—		1 (Note: Appearance(s) in Derbyshire Senior Cup)	1	12	7
Nuneaton Town (loan)	2014–15	Football Conference	3	0	0	0	0	0	3	0
Ilkeston (loan)	2014–15	Northern Premier League Premier Division	7	0	0	0	1	0	8	0
Lincoln City (loan)	2014–15	Football Conference	3	0	0	0	0	0	3	0
Lincoln City	2014–15	Football Conference	3	0	0	0	0	0	3	0
Skellefteå	2015–16	Division 2	15	9	0	0	0	0	15	9
Nuneaton Town	2015–16	National League North	9	1	0	0	1 (Note: Appearance(s) in Birmingham Senior Cup)	0	10	1
Kidderminster Harriers	2016–17	National League North	38	5	2	2	2	0	42	7
Boston United	2017–18	National League North	8	0	0	0	0	0	8	0
Matlock Town (loan)	2017–18	Northern Premier League Premier Division	8	2	—		2 (Note: One appearance in FA Trophy; one appearance in Northern Premier League Challenge Cup)	0	10	2
Stafford Rangers (loan)	2017–18	Northern Premier League Premier Division	10	0	0	0	0	0	10	0
Tamworth	2018–19	Southern League Premier Division Central	38	11	1	0	8 (Note: Three appearances one goal in FA Trophy; two appearances two goals in Southern League Cup; two appearances in Birmingham Senior Cup; one appearance in Staffordshire Senior Cup)	3	47	14
Tamworth	2019–20	Southern League Premier Division Central	28	9	5	0	5 (Note: Two appearances one goal in FA Trophy; one appearance one goal in Southern League Cup; one appearance in Birmingham Senior Cup; one appearance in Staffordshire Senior Cup)	2	38	11
Tamworth	2020–21	Southern League Premier Division Central	1	0	0	0	1	0	2	0
Tamworth	2021–22	Southern League Premier Division Central	18	4	5	2	4 (Note: Three appearances one goal in FA Trophy; one appearance one goal in Birmingham Senior Cup)	2	27	8
Tamworth	Total		85	24	11	2	18	7	114	33
Coalville Town	2021–22	Southern League Premier Division Central	19	4	0	0	2 (Note: Appearance(s) in Southern League Premier Division Central play-offs)	2	21	6
Career total			262	56	17	6	34	12	313	74

== Honours ==
=== Club ===
Stafford Rangers

- Staffordshire Senior Cup: 2017–18
