= Jimmy Spencer (footballer) =

English footballer (born 1991)

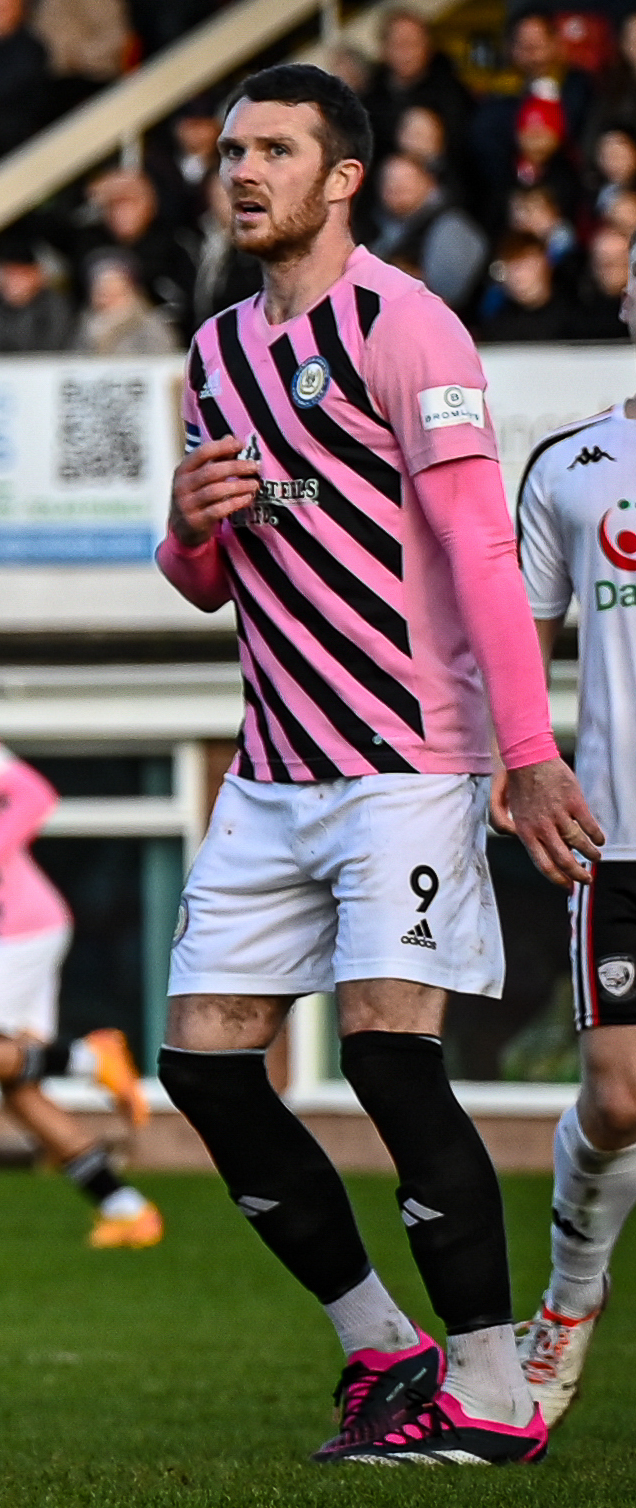
- Jimmy Spencer, playing for Curzon Ashton, in 2023

Personal information
- Full name: James Christopher Spencer
- Date of birth: 13 December 1991 (age 34)
- Place of birth: Leeds, England
- Height: 6 ft 1 in (1.85 m)
- Position: Forward

Team information
- Current team: Curzon Ashton

Youth career
- 1998–2010: Huddersfield Town

Senior career*
Years	Team	Apps	(Gls)
2009–2014	Huddersfield Town	1	(0)
2010	→ Northwich Victoria (loan)	7	(1)
2010–2011	→ Morecambe (loan)	32	(8)
2011–2012	→ Cheltenham Town (loan)	41	(10)
2012	→ Brentford (loan)	2	(0)
2013	→ Crawley Town (loan)	0	(0)
2013	→ Scunthorpe United (loan)	13	(1)
2014–2016	Notts County	29	(6)
2016	Cambridge United	18	(6)
2016–2017	Plymouth Argyle	25	(3)
2017–2018	Mansfield Town	18	(1)
2018–2023	Farsley Celtic	106	(26)
2023–	Curzon Ashton	141	(35)
- * Club domestic league appearances and goals as of 17:34, 8 February 2023 (UTC)

James Christopher Spencer (born 13 December 1991) is an English professional footballer who plays for Curzon Ashton. A product of the Huddersfield Town academy, he spent much of his career with the club away on loan and later played for English Football League clubs Notts County, Cambridge United, Plymouth Argyle and Mansfield Town.

== Career ==
=== Huddersfield Town ===
Spencer originally joined the academy as a seven-year-old in 1998 and progressed through the club's youth system. He was first offered professional terms with the club during the 2009–10 season after being loaned out to Northwich Victoria.

Spencer was then loaned out to Football League Two side Morecambe. Originally a six-month deal, it was extended to a season-long loan in the January transfer window. He made 32 league appearances, scoring eight goals. He signed a new two-year deal at The Galpharm Stadium in May 2011.

On 22 July, Huddersfield Town confirmed that he was set to join League Two side Cheltenham Town on a half-season loan for the 2011–12 season. He scored six goals in 18 matches and an agreement was reached on 28 December 2011, for him to remain on loan for the rest of the season.

==== Huddersfield Return 2012–13 ====
Spencer made his Huddersfield Town first team début in the League Cup first round 2–0 away defeat at Preston North End on 13 August 2012, playing 75 minutes on his début before being replaced by more experienced striker Alan Lee. He made his league début in the 1–0 defeat by Cardiff City at the Cardiff City Stadium on 17 August, as a late substitute. Spencer signed a one-year contract extension, tying him to the club until 2014 in August 2012.

On 16 October 2012, he joined Football League One side Brentford on a one-month loan deal. He returned on 21 November, after a period on the sidelines.

On 10 January 2013, he joined League One side Crawley Town on loan for the remainder of the season, but his loan was cancelled on 6 February, after he failed to shake off a knee injury, which meant he made no appearances for the Red Devils.

On 22 August 2013, Spencer joined Football League Two side Scunthorpe United on loan until 5 January 2014. The loan was ended on 30 December by the new Iron manager Russ Wilcox. His only goal in his 13 appearances for the club came in the 4–0 win over Rochdale at Spotland on 26 November.

On 31 January 2014, Spencer left Huddersfield after having his contract terminated.

=== Notts County ===
On 3 February, Spencer joined Notts County on a short-term contract until the end of the 2013–14 season. On 14 May 2014, Spencer signed a new two-year contract with the Magpies.

=== Cambridge United ===
On 29 January 2016, Spencer had his contract with Notts County terminated by mutual consent. On 30 January he joined Cambridge United on an initial six-month deal. That afternoon he came on as a substitute against Leyton Orient and scored with his first touch of the ball.

=== Plymouth Argyle ===
On 29 June 2016, Spencer signed for Football League Two club Plymouth Argyle

=== Mansfield Town ===
Spencer joined Mansfield Town in July 2017. He was released by Mansfield at the end of the 2017–18 season.

=== Farsley Celtic ===
In August 2018, Spencer dropped into non-league football to join Northern Premier League Premier Division club Farsley Celtic. He contributed to the club's automatic promotion to the National League North and its run to the 2019 Northern Premier League Cup Final. Spencer was voted the Northern Premier League Player of the Year and was retained for the 2019–20 season in a dual player-ambassador role.

=== Curzon Ashton ===
On 7 February 2023, Spencer signed for National League North rivals Curzon Ashton for an undisclosed fee.

== Career statistics ==
As of match played 8 February 2020

Appearances and goals by club, season and competition
Club	Season	League			FA Cup		League Cup		Other		Total	
Club	Season	Division	Apps	Goals	Apps	Goals	Apps	Goals	Apps	Goals	Apps	Goals
Huddersfield Town	2012–13	Championship	1	0	0	0	1	0	0	0	2	0
Northwich Victoria (loan)	2009–10	Conference Premier	7	1	—		—		—		7	1
Morecambe (loan)	2010–11	League Two	32	8	1	0	0	0	1 (Note: Appearances in EFL Trophy)	0	34	8
Cheltenham Town (loan)	2011–12	League Two	41	10	2	0	1	0	6 (Note: 3 appearances in EFL League Two play-offs, 3 appearances in EFL Trophy)	1	50	11
Brentford (loan)	2012–13	League One	2	0	0	0	—		—		2	0
Scunthorpe United (loan)	2013–14	League Two	13	1	2	0	—		1	0	16	1
Notts County	2013–14	League One	13	5	—		—		—		13	5
Notts County	2014–15	League One	9	1	0	0	0	0	0	0	9	1
Notts County	2015–16	League Two	7	0	1	0	2	0	0	0	10	0
Notts County	Total		29	6	1	0	2	0	0	0	32	6
Cambridge United	2015–16	League Two	18	6	—		—		—		18	6
Plymouth Argyle	2016–17	League Two	25	3	1	0	1	0	1	0	28	3
Mansfield Town	2017–18	League Two	18	1	3	3	1	0	4	0	0	0
Farsley Celtic	2018–19	Northern Premier League Premier Division	36	19	0	0	—		14 (Note: 3 appearances and 2 goals in Northern Premier League Cup, 2 appearances and 1 goal in FA Trophy)	6	50	25
Farsley Celtic	2019–20	National League North	29	10	0	0	—		9 (Note: Appearances in FA Trophy)	1	38	11
Farsley Celtic	2020-21	National League North	16	6	2	2			2	1	20	9
Farsley Celtic	Total		81	35	2	2	—		25	8	108	45
Career total			269	71	12	5	6	0	38	9	334	85

== Honours ==
Farsley Celtic

- Northern Premier League Premier Division: 2018–19

Individual

- Northern Premier League Player of the Year: 2018–19
