= Haydn Hollis =

English footballer (born 1992)

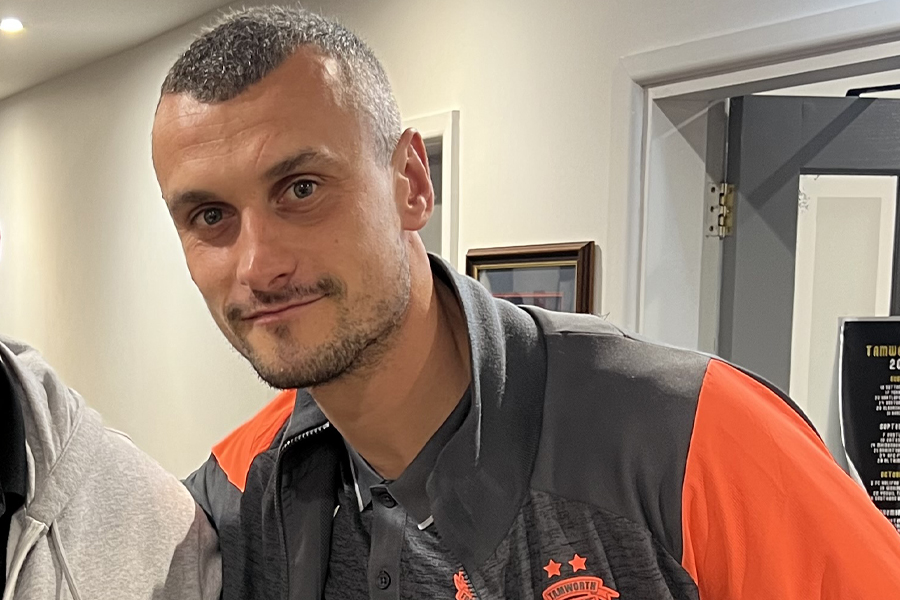
- Hollis in November 2024

Personal information
- Full name: Haydn Joseph Hollis
- Date of birth: 14 October 1992 (age 34)
- Place of birth: Selston, England
- Height: 6 ft 4 in (1.93 m)
- Position: Defender

Team information
- Current team: Darlington (player/coach)

Youth career
- 2009–2011: Notts County

Senior career*
Years	Team	Apps	(Gls)
2011–2018	Notts County	118	(7)
2011	→ Barrow (loan)	3	(1)
2012	→ Hinckley United (loan)	8	(1)
2012	→ Darlington (loan)	9	(1)
2018–2019	Forest Green Rovers	20	(2)
2018–2019	→ Chesterfield (loan)	35	(1)
2019–2022	Chesterfield	49	(14)
2022–2023	Ebbsfleet United	38	(2)
2023–2024	Dorking Wanderers	22	(1)
2024–2026	Tamworth	76	(5)
2026	→ Leek Town (loan)	1	(0)
2026–	Darlington	0	(0)
- * Club domestic league appearances and goals as of 18:06, 12 November 2026 (UTC)

Haydn Joseph Hollis (born 14 October 1992) is an English footballer who plays for National League North club Darlington.

A defender, he has played in the Football League with Notts County and Forest Green Rovers, and has also played on loan in the Conference for Barrow, Hinckley United, Darlington and Chesterfield, before signing for Ebbsfleet United in the summer of 2022. He made the move to Dorking Wanderers in November 2023. In June 2024, he signed for Tamworth FC for their first season back in the National league.

== Club career ==
=== Notts County ===
Hollis completed a two-year scholarship at Notts County, and signed a one-year professional contract with the club before the 2011–12 season.

==== Barrow (loan) ====
He joined Barrow of the Conference on loan for a month in September 2011. He scored on his debut the following day to open the scoring as Barrow went on to win 2–1 at Alfreton Town, (a team he'd represented at youth level) but sustained an ankle injury in training which restricted him to just three league games while at the club.

==== Return to Notts County ====
Hollis made his first-team debut for Notts County on 2 January 2012, playing the full 90 minutes as County came back from 2–0 down to draw at home to Huddersfield Town. This made him the first player to progress from the club's Centre of Excellence to a first-team start since its re-opening in 2008.

==== Darlington (loan) ====
In March, Hollis signed for Conference club Darlington on loan until the end of the season. He went straight into the starting eleven for the visit to Kidderminster Harriers, a 3–1 defeat, and started all their remaining games, scoring the opening goal of the 2–2 draw with Bath City that confirmed Darlington's relegation from the Conference.

==== Return to Notts County ====
On 11 March 2014, Hollis made his first appearance of the 2013–14 season as he replaced the injured Dean Leacock after 38 minutes of a 3–1 defeat at home to MK Dons. He impressed enough to start the next game, a 3–2 defeat to Tranmere Rovers, and in the following game he scored twice as Notts County beat Carlisle United 4–1 at Meadow Lane. He scored again two games later, in a 2–0 win against Colchester United.

=== Forest Green Rovers ===
On 9 January 2018, Hollis joined Forest Green Rovers on a free transfer, having fallen out of favour at Notts County.

On 23 August 2018, Hollis joined National League club Chesterfield on loan for the duration of the 2018–19 season. He was released by Forest Green Rovers at the end of the 2018–19 season.

=== Chesterfield ===
Following his release by Forest Green Rovers, Hollis joined former loan club Chesterfield on a one-year deal on 24 May 2019.

=== Ebbsfleet United ===
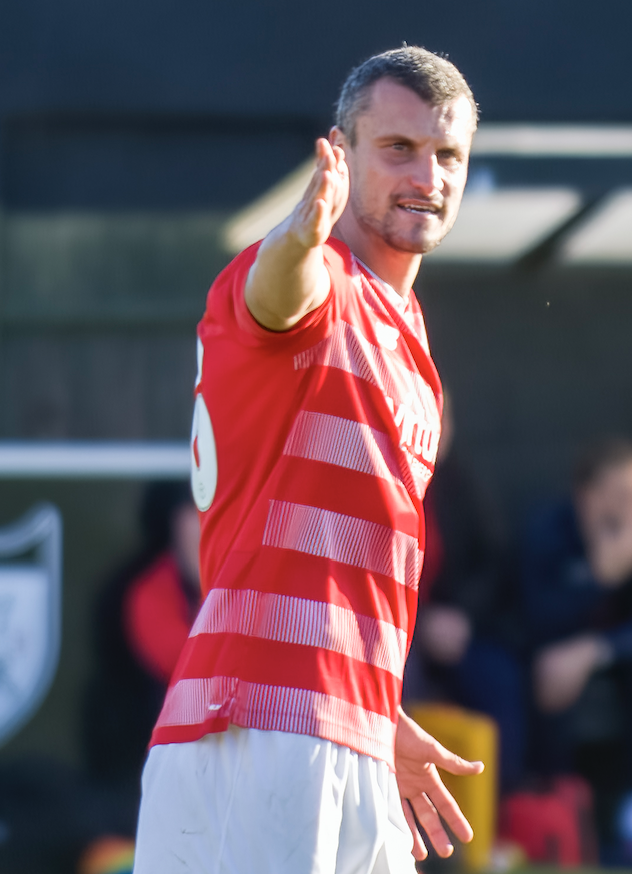
Hollis playing for Ebbsfleet United in October 2022.

On 1 July 2022, Hollis joined National League club Ebbsfleet United.

=== Dorking Wanderers ===
On 14 November 2023, Hollis made the move to fellow National League side, Dorking Wanderers on a deal until the end of the 2023–24 campaign. On 3 May 2024, it was announced that Hollis would leave the club at the end of his contract in June.

=== Tamworth ===
On 19 June 2024, Hollis joined newly promoted National League side Tamworth. On 12 January 2025, Hollis was named the Player of the Match in an FA Cup game against Premier League giants, Tottenham Hotspur.

On 6 November 2026, Hollis joined Northern Premier League Premier Division club Leek Town on a one-month loan deal.

=== Darlington ===
On 21 November 2026, Hollis returned to National League North club Darlington as player-coach.

== Coaching career ==
In July 2024, Hollis returned to former club Chesterfield, taking on a full-time coaching role with the club's academy.

== Career statistics ==
As of match played 15 September 2026.

Appearances and goals by club, season and competition
Club	Season	League			FA Cup		League Cup		Other		Total	
Club	Season	Division	Apps	Goals	Apps	Goals	Apps	Goals	Apps	Goals	Apps	Goals
Notts County	2011–12	League One	1	0	0	0	0	0	0	0	1	0
Notts County	2012–13	League One	6	0	0	0	0	0	0	0	6	0
Notts County	2013–14	League One	10	4	0	0	0	0	0	0	10	4
Notts County	2014–15	League One	41	0	1	0	1	0	4	0	47	0
Notts County	2015–16	League Two	29	2	0	0	0	0	2	0	31	2
Notts County	2016–17	League Two	31	1	3	0	1	0	3	0	38	1
Notts County	2017–18	League Two	0	0	0	0	1	0	3	1	4	1
Notts County	Total		118	7	4	0	3	0	12	1	137	8
Barrow (loan)	2011–12	Conference Premier	3	1	0	0	—		0	0	3	1
Hinckley United (loan)	2011–12	Conference North	8	0	0	0	—		0	0	8	0
Darlington (loan)	2011–12	Conference Premier	9	1	0	0	—		0	0	9	1
Forest Green Rovers	2017–18	League Two	19	0	0	0	0	0	1	0	20	0
Chesterfield (loan)	2018–19	National League	35	1	4	0	—		3	0	42	1
Chesterfield	2019–20	National League	31	2	2	0	—		1	0	34	2
Chesterfield	2020–21	National League	18	2	0	0	—		2	1	20	3
Chesterfield	2021–22	National League	0	0	0	0	—		0	0	0	0
Chesterfield	Total		84	5	6	0	0	0	6	1	96	6
Ebbsfleet United	2022–23	National League South	29	2	4	0	—		1	0	34	2
Ebbsfleet United	2023–24	National League	9	0	2	0	—		0	0	11	0
Ebbsfleet United	Total		38	2	6	0	0	0	1	0	45	2
Dorking Wanderers	2023–24	National League	22	1	0	0	—		2	0	24	1
Tamworth	2024–25	National League	46	3	3	0	—		0	0	49	3
Tamworth	2025–26	National League	26	2	1	0	—		1	0	28	2
Tamworth	2026–27	National League	5	0	0	0	—		1	0	6	0
Tamworth	Tamworth Total		76	5	4	0	0	0	2	0	82	5
Career total			373	22	20	0	3	0	23	2	422	24
