= Bill Corkhill =

Northern Ireland footballer

Personal information
- Full name: William Grant Corkhill
- Date of birth: 23 April 1910
- Place of birth: Belfast, Northern Ireland
- Date of death: 9 August 1978 (aged 68)
- Place of death: Nottingham, England
- Height: 5 ft 10 in (1.78 m)
- Position: Wing half

Senior career*
Years	Team	Apps	(Gls)
- Marine
1931–1938	Notts County	166	(9)
1938–1939	Cardiff City	23	(0)
1946–1952	Notts County	98	(0)
Total		287	(9)

Managerial career
- 1952–1956: Scunthorpe United
- 1956: Bradford Park Avenue
- * Club domestic league appearances and goals

William Grant Corkhill (23 April 1910 – 9 August 1978) was a Northern Irish footballer who played in the Football League for Cardiff City and Notts County. Corkhill's grandson Greg Tempest also became a professional footballer and played for Notts County.
