= Mustapha Dumbuya =

Sierra Leonean professional footballer

Personal information
- Full name: Mustapha Sima Michael Dumbuya
- Date of birth: 7 August 1987 (age 39)
- Place of birth: Freetown, Sierra Leone
- Height: 5 ft 8 in (1.73 m)
- Positions: Right-back; winger

Senior career*
Years	Team	Apps	(Gls)
2006–2007	Wingate & Finchley		
2007–2008	Maidenhead United		
2008–2009	Potters Bar Town	17	(1)
2009–2012	Doncaster Rovers	36	(0)
2012	→ Crystal Palace (Loan)	3	(0)
2012–2013	Portsmouth	23	(0)
2013	Crawley Town	15	(0)
2013–2015	Notts County	53	(0)
2015–2018	Partick Thistle	34	(1)
2018	Falkirk	0	(0)
2019	Phoenix Rising	27	(1)
2020	Tampa Bay Rowdies	11	(0)

International career^{‡}
2012–2020	Sierra Leone	12	(0)
- * Club domestic league appearances and goals as of 11:40, 7 October 2020 (UTC) ‡ National team caps and goals as of 16:11, 28 October 2015 (UTC)

Mustapha Sima Michael Dumbuya (born 7 August 1987) is a Sierra Leonean former professional footballer who played as a defender.

== Early life ==
Born in Sierra Leone, Dumbuya was five years old when, amid the Sierra Leone Civil War, he moved to England to live with his mother and brother. Dumbuya's father remained in Sierra Leone and, according to Dumbuya in 2012, works for Sierra Leone's armed forces.

== Club career ==
=== Non-League ===
Dumbuya started his career in the English non-League circuit. He began with Wingate & Finchley before moving on to Conference South side Maidenhead United. In 2008, he joined Isthmian League team Potters Bar Town making 17 appearances and scoring one goal in his season with "The Scholars".

=== Doncaster Rovers ===
Dumbuya joined Doncaster Rovers in August 2009 from Potters Bar Town. He also had trials and trained with Grays Athletic, Gillingham, Hereford United before joining Doncaster. He made his Football League debut on 3 October 2009 for Doncaster Rovers in the 1–1 away draw with Sheffield United, replacing John Spicer in the 90th minute as a substitute. In his three seasons at the Keepmoat Stadium he made 36 appearances without scoring. He was signed by Sean O'Driscoll and played 3 games in his first season (2009–10). The next season, he played regularly in the first team making 23 appearances. In September 2011 Doncaster sacked O'Driscoll and replaced him with then Wrexham manager Dean Saunders. Dumbuya made just 10 appearances for Saunders in the 2011–12 Championship season. At the end of the season, Doncaster were relegated to the League One after a 4–2 home defeat to Portsmouth, and he was released shortly after.

==== Crystal Palace (Loan) ====
On 6 January 2012, Dumbuya signed on loan to Crystal Palace, on a one-month deal. He received the No. 41 jersey, and made his debut on the following day, against Derby County. On 14 January, Dumbuya made his league debut, against Leeds United. He only made one more appearance against Blackpool before returning to Doncaster.

=== Portsmouth ===
In June 2012 it was announced that Dumbuya joined Portsmouth on trial. Due to "Pompey" not being able to sign any players as they could not afford the wages he could only train with the blues and not sign. He was one of over twenty other footballers who were on trial with the club. Dumbuya played in pre-season matches in Spain and Gibraltar. He took part in the two matches played out there. The first game he took part in was in a 4–0 loss to the Gibraltar national football team and the second was against Brighton & Hove Albion. Back in England, Dumbuya played in a further three pre-season matches in wins against Bolton at Fratton Park and two matches away from home against Aldershot Town and AFC Wimbledon. On 16 August, Dumbuya signed a one-month contract with Portsmouth. He made his debut in a 1–1 draw at home to Bournemouth in League One. During his first month at Fratton Park he impressed and gained the respect of the fans with some great performances, including a fantastic solo run in a game against Colchester United, dashing from his own box to the opposing area and setting up Jordan Obita for Portsmouth to pick up a 90th-minute equaliser.

=== Crawley Town ===
After his release from Portsmouth, Dumbuya joined fellow League One side Crawley Town a week later on 22 January 2013, on a six-month contract. He made his debut on 2 February 2013, against Swindon Town.

=== Notts County ===
On 2 July 2013, Dumbuya agreed a two-year contract with Notts County. He made his league debut for Notts on 2 August 2013 in a 2–1 loss to Sheffield United. He made 52 appearances for the side across 3 seasons.

=== Partick Thistle ===
Dumbuya signed for Scottish Premiership team Partick Thistle on 2 September 2015, on a one-year contract. He scored his first goal for the club in a 3–0 win over Dundee United. On 15 December 2015, Dumbuya signed a new two-year contract extension, which will keep him with Partick Thistle until 2018. He had won the club's Player of The Month award earlier that day. Thistle were relegated via the playoffs at the end of the 2017/18 season. Following that relegation, Dumbuya was one of many players released by Thistle.

=== Falkirk ===
He signed for Falkirk in November 2018 but left the club a month later without making an appearance.

=== Phoenix Rising ===
Dumbuya signed with Phoenix Rising FC on 10 January 2019. Phoenix advanced to the Western Conference Semi-Final in Dumbuya's one season with the club.

=== Tampa Bay Rowdies ===
On 20 December 2019 Dumbuya signed with the Tampa Bay Rowdies, also in USL Championship.

== International career ==
Dumbuya was called up to the Sierra Leone squad for the 2013 Africa Cup of Nations qualification match against São Tomé and Príncipe, however a mix up with tickets meant it was too late for him to join up with the squad. Dumbuya said; "Obviously I'm a bit gutted to miss out but the next qualifier is in June and I hope to be called up again then." He was called up again in August 2012 for the qualifier against Tunisia.

On 14 October, he finally made his debut for Leone Stars, in the second tie against Tunisia.

== Career statistics ==
As of 31 December 2018

Appearances and goals by club, season and competition
Club	Season	League			National Cup		League Cup		Other		Total	
Club	Season	Division	Apps	Goals	Apps	Goals	Apps	Goals	Apps	Goals	Apps	Goals
Doncaster Rovers	2009–10	Championship	3	0	0	0	0	0	—		3	0
Doncaster Rovers	2010–11	Championship	23	0	0	0	1	0	—		24	0
Doncaster Rovers	2011–12	Championship	10	0	—		1	0	—		11	0
Doncaster Rovers	Doncaster total		36	0	0	0	2	0	0	0	38	0
Crystal Palace (loan)	2011–12	Championship	2	0	1	0	—		—		3	0
Portsmouth	2012–13	League One	24	0	1	0	0	0	1 (Note: Appearances in the Football League Trophy)	0	26	0
Crawley Town	2013–14	League One	15	0	0	0	0	0	0	0	15	0
Notts County	2013–14	League One	24	0	0	0	2	0	1	0	27	0
Notts County	2014–15	League One	29	0	1	0	0	0	1	0	31	0
Notts County	Notts County total		53	0	1	0	2	0	2	0	58	0
Partick Thistle	2015–16	Scottish Premiership	21	1	0	0	0	0	—		21	1
Partick Thistle	2016–17	Scottish Premiership	8	0	1	0	0	0	—		9	0
Partick Thistle	2017–18	Scottish Premiership	5	0	0	0	0	0	—		5	0
Partick Thistle	Partick Thistle total		34	1	1	0	0	0	0	0	35	1
Falkirk	2018–19	Scottish Championship	0	0	0	0	0	0	0	0	0	0
Career total			164	1	4	0	4	0	3	0	175	1
