= Kyle Dixon (footballer) =

English footballer (born 1994)

Personal information
- Full name: Kyle Antony Dixon
- Date of birth: 19 November 1994 (age 31)
- Place of birth: Nottingham, England
- Position: Midfielder

Team information
- Current team: Shepshed Dynamo

Youth career
- 2011–2012: Notts County

Senior career*
Years	Team	Apps	(Gls)
2012–2015	Notts County	1	(0)
2013–2014	→ Grantham Town (loan)		
2014	→ Boston United (loan)	5	(0)
2014	→ Boston United (loan)	12	(0)
2014	→ AFC Telford United (loan)	2	(0)
2015–2017	Boston United	36	(2)
2017	North Ferriby United	10	(0)
2017–2018	Coalville Town	17	(1)
2018–2020	Newark Flowserve		
2020–2021	Basford United	8	(0)
2021–2022	Gainsborough Trinity	4	(0)
2022–2023	Belper Town	6	(1)
2023–	Shepshed Dynamo	14	(4)
- * Club domestic league appearances and goals

Kyle Antony Tony Dixon (born 1994) is an English footballer who plays for Shepshed Dynamo as a midfielder.

== Career ==
Born in Nottingham, Dixon started a two-year scholarship in 2011 with Notts County. He made his professional debut on 4 September 2012, in a 2–1 victory over Scunthorpe United in the Football League Trophy, replacing Joss Labadie as a substitute. He left Notts County by mutual consent in February 2015. In 2020, Dixon joined Basford United F.C.

On 3 June 2021, Dixon joined Gainsborough Trinity.

== Career statistics ==
As of match played 16 December 2017

Appearances and goals by club, season and competition
Club	Season	League			FA Cup		League Cup		Other		Total	
Club	Season	Division	Apps	Goals	Apps	Goals	Apps	Goals	Apps	Goals	Apps	Goals
Notts County	2012–13	League One	0	0	0	0	0	0	1 (Note: Appearance in the Football League Trophy)	0	1	0
Notts County	2013–14	League One	1	0	0	0	0	0	0	0	1	0
Notts County	Notts County total		1	0	0	0	0	0	1	0	2	0
Grantham Town (loan)	2013–14	NPL - Premier Division					—					
Boston United (loan)	2013–14	Conference North	5	0	0	0	—		0	0	5	0
Boston United (loan)	2014–15	Conference North	12	0	0	0	—		2 (Note: Appearances in the FA Trophy)	0	14	0
Telford United (loan)	2014–15	Conference Premier	2	0	0	0	—		0	0	2	0
Boston United	2014–15	Conference North	15	1	0	0	—		0	0	15	1
Boston United	2015–16	National League North	21	1	0	0	—		0	0	21	1
Boston United	Boston total		36	2	0	0	0	0	0	0	36	2
North Ferriby United	2017–18	National League North	10	0	0	0	—		0	0	10	0
Career total			66	2	0	0	0	0	3	0	69	2
