= Joss Labadie =

English footballer (born 1990)

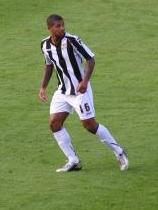
- Labadie playing for Notts County in 2013.

Personal information
- Full name: Joss Christopher Labadie
- Date of birth: 30 August 1990 (age 36)
- Place of birth: Croydon, England
- Height: 1.88 m (6 ft 2 in)
- Position: Midfielder

Team information
- Current team: Hednesford Town

Youth career
- 2006–2008: West Bromwich Albion

Senior career*
Years	Team	Apps	(Gls)
2008–2010	West Bromwich Albion	0	(0)
2009	→ Shrewsbury Town (loan)	1	(0)
2009	→ Shrewsbury Town (loan)	13	(5)
2009–2010	→ Cheltenham Town (loan)	11	(0)
2010	→ Tranmere Rovers (loan)	9	(3)
2010–2012	Tranmere Rovers	61	(7)
2012–2014	Notts County	39	(3)
2013	→ Torquay United (loan)	7	(4)
2014	→ Torquay United (loan)	3	(0)
2014	Torquay United	7	(1)
2014–2016	Dagenham & Redbridge	52	(6)
2016–2021	Newport County	122	(13)
2021–2023	Walsall	40	(0)
2023–2025	Solihull Moors	43	(0)
2025–	Hednesford Town	13	(1)
- * Club domestic league appearances and goals as of 21:48, 16 January 2026

Joss Christopher Labadie (born 30 August 1990) is an English footballer who plays as a midfielder for National League North club Hednesford Town.

== Career ==
=== Early career ===
Born in Croydon, Labadie began his football career with West Bromwich Albion. He joined their academy in 2006 after being spotted playing for Barking Abbey College of Sport and being invited for a trial. In the 2007–08 season, he played 19 times for Albion's reserve team, scoring three times. This earned him his first professional contract in the summer of 2008, on a one-year deal with the option of a second season.

Before he was able to break into the Albion first team, he was sent on loan to League Two side Shrewsbury Town on 1 January 2009. He played for Shrewsbury two days later in a league match against Bradford City at Valley Parade, in a game which finished 0–0. He subsequently fractured his foot in training and returned to West Brom less than a week after he had left the club. He returned to Shrewsbury on an initial month-long loan on 3 August. He made his first appearance of the 2009–10 season in a 3–1 victory over Burton Albion, during which he scored a free kick from 30 yards. After extending his loan spell until January, Labadie scored on 12 September 2009, in a 2–0 win over Crewe Alexandra. After adding three more goals against Northampton Town, Cheltenham Town and Morecambe, where he was sent-off during the match, Labadie returned to West Brom in November, with Shrewsbury manager Paul Simpson saying, "I've been disappointed with his recent attitude."

Later the same year, Labadie had another loan spell in League Two, this time with Cheltenham Town. He made his Cheltenham Town debut on 21 November 2009, where he started the whole game, in a 1–0 loss against Morecambe. A handful of first-team appearances led Labadie to have his loan spell extended on two occasions, all the way to February. He made eleven appearances for the side before returning to his parent club in February.

West Brom released Labadie on 14 May 2010.

=== Tranmere Rovers ===
On 24 March 2010, Labadie signed for Tranmere Rovers on loan until the end of the 2009–10 season. He made his club debut during a 3–0 defeat to Brighton & Hove Albion. He did not score his first goal until 17 April 2010 in a 3–1 win over Exeter City. He scored again in a 2–1 loss against Brentford three days later. Labadie also scored against Stockport County in the last game of the season. Tranmere Rovers survived relegation by one point.

On learning of his release from West Bromwich Albion at the end of the 2009–10 season, the club immediately made a contract offer to Labadie. On 20 May 2010 he signed a two-year contract with Tranmere. Since joining the club on a permanent basis, Labadie was a first team regular, although he was plagued by injuries, He was sent-off for violent conduct during a 1–0 win over Notts County on 20 November 2010. After serving a two-match suspension, Labadie scored on his return against Rochdale on 1 January 2011 despite losing 3–2. However, during a 2–0 loss against Milton Keynes Dons on 15 January 2011, he was booked for "simulation" or diving in the first half. Manager Les Parry insisted that he is not a cheat. Despite this, he scored again in a 2–1 loss against Brentford on 22 February 2011. After serving his suspension on two occasions, Labadie, nevertheless, made the total of 37 appearances and scored twice in his first permanent season at the club.

In the 2011–12 season, Labadie started the season well when he scored two goals against Notts County and Sheffield United He then scored two goals against Stevenage and Bury. However, Labadie's first team opportunities were soon limited. He was on the substitute bench with a foot injury. Despite this, he scored again on 24 March 2012, in a 2–0 win over Exeter City. After the match, Manager Ronnie Moore commented on Labadie's performance: "Joss took his opportunity well." After finishing his second season, making a total of 31 appearances and scoring five times in all competitions, Tranmere Rovers released him at the end of the 2011–12 season.

=== Notts County ===
On 9 July 2012, Labadie signed a one-year contract with Notts County.

He made his competitive debut for the club in the first round of the League Cup against Bradford City. He played his first league game in a 2–1 win over Crewe Alexandra coming on as a substitute in the first half to replace the injured Tom Williams. He scored his first goal for the club in a 2–2 draw away at Oldham Athletic. However, he soon found himself out of the first team and appeared on the substitute bench. After returning from a loan spell at Torquay United, he scored the only goal with a 35-yard free kick in a 1–0 win away at Doncaster Rovers, resulting him being named Team of the Week. After making a total of 28 appearances and scoring twice, Notts County announced on 1 May 2013 that he had been offered a contract extension. Ahead of the 2013–14 season, Labadie signed a one-year contract extension, keeping him until 2014.

Labadie appeared in the first team at the beginning of the season despite the club's poor start to the season. He then scored on 21 September 2013, in a 2–0 win over the Tranmere Rovers. As a result, he was awarded for September's Goal of the Month. However, his first team chance was soon limited by his suspension.

=== Torquay United ===
After being unable to break into the Notts County first team Labadie joined Torquay for the remainder of the 2012–13 season. He scored his first goal for Torquay in a 2–2 draw with Dagenham and Redbridge. Four days later he scored his second goal in a 1–1 draw with Southend United. After adding another goal against Chesterfield, He scored again on 1 April 2013, in a 3–1 loss against Bradford City, in what turned out to be his last appearance for the side. He was recalled from his loan at Torquay on 5 April, after scoring four goals in seven appearances for the club.

On 3 January 2014, Labadie re-joined Torquay United on loan until 30 January 2014. On 31 January 2014, his contract with Notts County was terminated by mutual consent, and he signed a contract until the end of the season with Torquay United. Just three weeks into his contract, The FA announced that it was investigating an alleged biting incident in the Football League Two game against Chesterfield on 15 February 2014. A number of Chesterfield players claimed they were bitten by a then unnamed player during the game. On 4 March, the FA announced that Labadie had been charged with misconduct for an incident in the 49th minute of the game. Three days later Torquay and their manager, Chris Hargreaves, announced they were contesting the charge. On 12 March, The FA announced that a commission had found Labadie guilty of biting Ollie Banks. It banned Labadie for ten games and fined him £2,000 for the incident. The ban mirrored punishment given to Luis Suárez for a similar incident in April 2013. The day before the charges were announced, Labadie scored in a 2–1 win over Rochdale. The ban took him through to the end of the season when manager Hargreaves told the press that it was unlikely that Labadie would be offered a new contract after the club's relegation to non-league.

=== Dagenham & Redbridge ===
After being released by Torquay, Labadie signed for Dagenham & Redbridge on 8 July 2014 on a two-year contract.

Labadie made his Dagenham & Redbridge debut in the first round of the League Cup against Brentford, where he played 86 minutes. The club lost 4–2 in a penalty shootout following a 6–6 draw after extra time. He then made his league debut for the club, where he played 18 minutes after coming on as a substitute, in a 2–1 loss against Burton Albion. He scored his first goals for the club on 27 September 2014, in a 2–0 win over York City. Although he suffered a hamstring injury, Labadie found himself in and out of the first team. In April 2015 he was banned for six months after being found guilty of biting an opponent in a game on 21 March 2015 against Stevenage. Late in the ill-tempered game, Labadie had challenged Stevenage player, Ronnie Henry. The bite occurred after Labadie failed to release the ball after it had gone out for a throw-in. In his first season at Dagenham & Redbridge, Labadie went on to make a total of 27 appearances, scoring twice.

At the start of the 2015–16 season, Labadie remained out of the first team, having served just four months of his suspension. On 20 October 2015, he finally made his first appearance, coming on as a late substitute, in a 2–2 draw against York City. He scored his first goal of the season in a 1–1 draw against Plymouth Argyle on 28 November 2015. In the absence of Andre Boucaud, Labadie was his stand-in captain during the 2015–16 season. Labadie scored two goals in two matches between 28 December 2015 and 1 January 2016, both winning against Stevenage and Exeter City. Despite being sidelined over suspension and injury on two occasions later in the season, Labadie scored again on 5 April 2016, as well as assisting another goal, in a 2–1 win over Morecambe. Following the club's relegation to the non-league at the end of the 2016–17 season, Labadie made a total of 34 appearances and scored five times. The team's season ticket holders awarded Labadie Player of the Season.

However, Labadie was released by the club when his contract expired.

=== Newport County ===
On 7 June 2016, Labadie signed a two-year deal with Newport County.

Labadie scored on his debut for Newport on 6 August 2016 versus Mansfield Town in the opening game of the season, which Mansfield won 3–2. After making his debut for the club, Labadie quickly became a first team regular until he suffered an injury during a 2–0 loss against Doncaster Rovers on 17 September 2016. After being sidelined for three months, he returned to the first team in early December. Labadie scored again in a 3–1 loss against Crawley Town on 17 December 2016. However, his return was short-lived when he suffered a knee injury in a 1–0 loss against Plymouth Argyle in the FA Cup Campaign.

Labadie made his return to the first team, in a 4–0 defeat to Leyton Orient on 4 March 2017. In a follow- up against Crewe Alexandra, Labadie scored again on 11 March 2017, in a 2–1 win. However, he was sent-off for an off-the-ball altercation with Crawley Town's Josh Yorwerth, who was also sent-off, in a 1–0 win on 1 April 2017, and served a three-match suspension, Towards the end of the season, with the club facing relegation to the non-league, Labadie captained for the side as a stand in for Scot Bennett and David Pipe. Labadie was part of the Newport squad that completed the 'Great Escape' with a 2–1 victory at home to Notts County on the final day of the 2016–17 season, which ensured Newport's survival in League Two. In his first season at the club, Labadie made a total of 22 appearances, scoring three times.

Ahead of the 2017–18 season, Labadie succeeded Bennett as the new captain. He had an operation on his wrist at the end of the 2016–17 season. Labadie switched his shirt from number 6 to 4. In the opening game of the season, he set up one of the goals, in a 3–3 draw against Stevenage. Several weeks later, on 22 August 2017, he scored his first goal of the season, in a 5–1 loss against Leeds United in the second round of League Cup. After suffering a groin injury, he scored two goals in two matches between 30 September 2017 and 7 October 2017 against Luton Town and Yeovil Town. However, Labadie, once again, suffered a groin injury for the second time during the season. On 10 March 2017 Labadie suffered a cruciate ligament injury against Yeovil Town that ruled him out for the remainder of the 2017–18 season. Labadie declined a new contract with Newport at the end of the 2017–18 season and he became a free agent whilst still recovering from the cruciate injury. On 23 October 2018 Labadie re-signed for Newport until the end of the 2018–19 season. He was part of the team that reached the League Two playoff final at Wembley Stadium on 25 May 2019. Newport lost to Tranmere Rovers 1-0 after a goal in the 119th minute. In July 2019 Labadie signed a further two-year contract extension with Newport county. Labadie played for Newport in the League Two playoff final at Wembley Stadium on 31 May 2021 which Newport lost to Morecambe, 1-0 after a 107th-minute penalty.

=== Walsall ===
On 12 June 2021, Labadie joined Walsall on a two-year contract.

At the beginning of the 2021–22 season Labadie was made captain for the campaign. Labadie made his Walsall debut on 7 August 2021 versus Tranmere, which they lost 1–0. He was released by Walsall at the end of the 2022–23 season.

He was released at the end of the 2022–23 season.

=== Solihull Moors ===
On 18 July 2023, Labadie signed for National League club Solihull Moors on a one-year deal. On 26 June 2024, he extended his contract for a year with the club.

He departed the club at the end of the 2024–25 season.

=== Hednesford Town ===
On 22 May 2025, Labadie joined newly promoted Northern Premier League Premier Division side Hednesford Town.

== Career statistics ==
As of 27 December 2025

Appearances and goals by club, season and competition
Club	Season	League			FA Cup		League Cup		Other		Total	
Club	Season	Division	Apps	Goals	Apps	Goals	Apps	Goals	Apps	Goals	Apps	Goals
West Bromwich Albion (loan)	2008–09	Premier League	0	0	0	0	0	0	—		0	0
West Bromwich Albion (loan)	2009–10	Championship	0	0	—		0	0	—		0	0
West Bromwich Albion (loan)	Total		0	0	0	0	0	0	—		0	0
Shrewsbury Town (loan)	2008–09	League Two	1	0	—		—		—		1	0
Shrewsbury Town (loan)	2009–10	League Two	13	5	1	0	—		1 (Note: Appearance(s) in Football League Trophy)	0	15	5
Shrewsbury Town (loan)	Total		14	5	1	0	—		1	0	16	5
Cheltenham Town (loan)	2009–10	League Two	11	0	—		—		—		11	0
Tranmere Rovers (loan)	2009–10	League One	9	3	—		—		—		9	3
Tranmere Rovers	2010–11	League One	34	2	1	0	2	0	2	0	39	2
Tranmere Rovers	2011–12	League One	27	5	1	0	0	0	3	0	31	5
Tranmere Rovers	Total		70	10	2	0	2	0	5	0	79	10
Notts County	2012–13	League One	24	2	3	0	1	0	1	0	29	2
Notts County	2013–14	League One	15	1	1	0	2	0	3	0	21	1
Notts County	Total		39	3	4	0	3	0	4	0	50	3
Torquay United (loan)	2012–13	League Two	7	4	—		—		—		7	4
Torquay United	2013–14	League Two	10	1	—		—		—		10	1
Torquay United	Total		17	5	0	0	0	0	0	0	17	5
Dagenham & Redbridge	2014–15	League Two	24	2	1	0	1	0	1	0	27	2
Dagenham & Redbridge	2015–16	League Two	28	4	5	1	0	0	1	0	34	5
Dagenham & Redbridge	Total		52	6	6	1	1	0	2	0	61	7
Newport County	2016–17	League Two	19	3	1	0	1	0	1 (Note: Appearance(s) in EFL Trophy)	0	22	3
Newport County	2017–18	League Two	25	3	4	2	2	1	0	0	31	6
Newport County	2018–19	League Two	13	0	4	0	0	0	4 (Note: One appearance in EFL Trophy, three in EFL League Two play-offs)	0	21	0
Newport County	2019–20	League Two	27	3	3	1	0	0	2	0	32	4
Newport County	2020–21	League Two	38	4	1	0	2	1	2 (Note: Appearances in EFL League Two play-offs)	1	43	6
Newport County	Total		122	13	13	3	5	2	9	1	149	19
Walsall	2021–22	League Two	35	0	2	0	1	0	3	0	41	0
Walsall	2022–23	League Two	5	0	0	0	0	0	0	0	5	0
Walsall	Total		40	0	2	0	1	0	3	0	46	0
Solihull Moors	2023–24	National League	24	0	2	0	—		6 (Note: Four appearances in FA Trophy, two appearances in the National League play-offs)	0	32	0
Solihull Moors	2024–25	National League	19	0	2	1	—		0	0	21	1
Solihull Moors	Total		43	0	4	1	0	0	6	0	53	1
Hednesford Town	2025–26	NPL Premier Division	13	1	3	0	0	0	0	0	16	1
Career total			421	43	35	5	12	2	30	1	498	51

== Honours ==
Solihull Moors

- FA Trophy runner-up: 2023–24

Hednesford Town

- Northern Premier League Play Offs: 2025-26
