= Adam Coombes =

English footballer

Personal information
- Full name: Adam Julian Coombes
- Date of birth: 19 June 1991 (age 35)
- Place of birth: Carshalton, England
- Position: Striker

Team information
- Current team: Cray Valley Paper Mills

Youth career
- –2006: Sutton United
- 2006–2010: Chelsea

Senior career*
Years	Team	Apps	(Gls)
2010–2013	Chelsea	0	(0)
2010	→ Yeovil Town (loan)	3	(0)
2013–2014	Notts County	6	(0)
2016	Bromley	15	(1)
2016–2017	Welling United	24	(20)
2017–2018	Sutton United	26	(2)
2017	→ Hampton & Richmond (loan)	3	(3)
2018	Welling United	9	(4)
2018–2019	Billericay Town	32	(13)
2018	→ Welling United (loan)	2	(2)
2019–2020	Welling United	21	(7)
2019	→ Wealdstone (loan)	4	(1)
2020–2021	Walton Casuals	5	(3)
2021	Farnborough	0	(0)
2021	Cray Wanderers	13	(1)
2022	Tonbridge Angels	22	(5)
2022–	Cray Valley Paper Mills	37	(12)

International career
2007	England U16	2	(0)
2007	England U17	1	(0)
- * Club domestic league appearances and goals as of 10:33, 6 November 2023 (UTC)

Adam Julian Coombes (born 19 June 1991) is an English footballer who plays as a striker for Isthmian League South East Division club Cray Valley Paper Mills.

== Club career ==
=== Chelsea ===
Coombes was scouted by Chelsea while playing in the Non League for Sutton United and being offered a chance to join the Chelsea Academy. His progress continued and he was offered a two-year scholarship from the start of the 2007–08 season.

The 2011–12 season started with good form shown and a reserve team goal scored in the opening month but then the highly unfortunate run of injuries continued. In August 2011, Coombes suffered a knee injury, being sidelined for six to nine months.

In January 2012 Coombes signed a 12-month extension to a contract that had six months to run, and returned from injury towards the end of the season to make three substitute appearances. He was released by Chelsea with 6 months still remaining on his contract in January 2013 to give him a better chance in finding a club before those released in the summer.

==== Yeovil Town (loan) ====
On 15 November 2010, Coombes was loaned out to Football League One club Yeovil Town on a month's youth loan, and made his debut five days later, in a 2–3 away defeat against Charlton Athletic. He made three substitute appearances before returning to Chelsea.

=== Notts County ===
On 1 August 2013 Coombes signed for Notts County. On 27 August 2013, he scored the equalizing goal with his first touch after coming on as a substitute against Liverpool in a 4–2 defeat at Anfield in the League Cup.

=== Bromley ===
On 22 January 2016, it was announced that Coombes had signed for National League side Bromley. He scored his first goal for the club in a 3–1 defeat away to Gateshead on 23 April. He was released by the club at the end of the season.

=== Welling United ===
On 25 August, it was announced that Coombes had signed for Welling United, linking up with Mark Goldberg, whom he worked under at Bromley. Coombes proved prolific in the first half of the 2016–17 season for Welling. Between August and 1 January 2017 he scored 29 goals in 24 matches in all competitions, including a rare double hat-trick in a 7-1 FA Cup 4th Qualifying Round victory over Swindon Supermarine on 1 October 2016. The double hat-trick equaled Welling's 'most goals in a match' club record set in 1985 by John Bartley.

Coombes continued prolific goal-scoring form into 2017, and left Welling for Sutton United on 22 February 2017 with a 0.83 goals ratio (a goal every 103 minutes) from 20 League matches for the Wings.

=== Sutton United ===
On 24 February 2017, Coombes returned to boyhood club Sutton United after impressing at Welling United. On 25 February, Coombes made his debut for Sutton in a 3–2 victory against Torquay United at Plainmoor. On 28 February, Coombes made his first home appearance in a 1–0 victory over Boreham Wood, assisting the game's only goal for Maxime Biamou. Coombes scored his first goals for Sutton on 22 April, a brace in a 5–2 home win over Chester.

=== Return to Welling United ===
On 10 March 2018, it was announced that Coombes had re-signed for Welling United, in a deal to run until 2020, which would see Coombes link up with Welling United Chairman Mark Goldberg for the third time, having previously worked under Goldberg at Bromley and Welling United.

=== Billericay Town ===
Coombes signed for recently promoted National League South side Billericay Town on 20 July 2018. He made his debut for his new side on 4 August starting in a 4–0 away victory over Truro City and scored his first goal 10 days later against the side he signed from, Welling United. However, this proved to be his only goal in his first 8 matches and on 28 September returned to Welling United on a short loan. In his first game back for the Wings he scored both goals in a 2–1 victory over Slough Town. Coombes returned to Billericay after less than a month and in his first game back came off the bench against East Thurrock United with the scoreline 0–2 to the visitors and proceeded to score twice as Billericay mounted a comeback to win the game 3–2.

On 28 September 2018, he was loaned out to Welling United for one month. He was released by Billericay at the end of the 2018–19 season.

=== Welling United ===
In the summer 2019, Coombes returned to Welling United, this time on a permanent deal. On 26 December 2019, he was loaned out to Wealdstone F.C. until 31 January 2020.

=== Later career ===
In December 2021, Coombes signed for National League South club Tonbridge Angels following a spell with Cray Wanderers.

In July 2022, Coombes joined Cray Valley Paper Mills.

== Personal life ==
He was previously known as Adam Phillip, but officially changed his surname in July 2012 to adopt the use of his mother's maiden name.

== Career statistics ==
As of match played 23 March 2019.

Appearances and goals by club, season and competition
Club	Season	League			FA Cup		League Cup		Other		Total	
Club	Season	Division	Apps	Goals	Apps	Goals	Apps	Goals	Apps	Goals	Apps	Goals
Yeovil Town (loan)	2010–11	League One	3	0	0	0	0	0	0	0	3	0
Notts County	2013–14	League One	6	0	0	0	1	1	1 (Note: Appearance(s) in Football League Trophy)	0	8	1
Bromley	2015–16	National League	15	1	0	0	—		0	0	15	1
Welling United	2016–17	National League South	24	20	3	7	—		4 (Note: Appearance(s) in FA Trophy)	3	31	30
Sutton United	2016–17	National League	13	2	—		—		—		13	2
Sutton United	2017–18	National League	13	0	1	0	—		2	1	16	1
Sutton United	Total		26	2	1	0	—		2	1	29	3
Hampton & Richmond Borough (loan)	2017–18	National League South	3	3	—		—		—		3	3
Welling United	2017–18	National League South	9	4	—		—		0	0	9	4
Billericay Town	2018–19	National League South	26	12	—		—		—		26	12
Welling United (loan)	2018–19	National League South	2	2	—		—		—		2	2
Career total			114	44	4	7	1	1	7	4	126	56
