= Romello Nangle =

English footballer (born 1995)

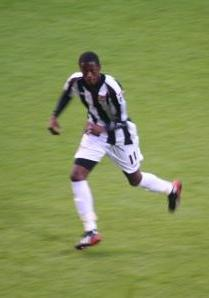

Personal information
- Full name: Romello Desmond Camar Nangle
- Date of birth: 8 January 1995 (age 31)
- Place of birth: Nottingham, England
- Position: Forward

Youth career
- 2011–2012: Notts County

Senior career*
Years	Team	Apps	(Gls)
2012–2014	Notts County	8	(1)
2014	→ Whitehawk (loan)	4	(0)
2022–2023	Gedling Miners Welfare		
2023–2023	Carlton Town	0	
2025–2026	Woodthorpe Park Rangers	7	(5)
2025–2026	Kimberley Miners Welfare	3	(2)
2025–2026	Eastwood	3	(1)
- * Club domestic league appearances and goals as of 19 March 2026

Romello Desmond Camar Nangle (born 8 January 1995) is a former English footballer who played as a forward for Notts County.

== Career ==
Born in Nottingham, England, Nangle started a two-year scholarship in 2011 with Notts County, scoring nine goals in his debut season for the youth side. He made his professional debut on 1 September 2012, in a 2–0 victory over Bury in League One, replacing Lee Hughes as a substitute.

In July 2023, Nangle signed for Northern Premier League club Carlton Town.

In October 2025, Nangle joined Nottinghamshire Senior League club Woodthorpe Park Rangers.

Later in the season he moved on to Kimberley Miners Welfare and again to Eastwood both in the United Counties League Premier Division North.

== Career statistics ==
As of 13 April 2013.

Club	Season	League			FA Cup		League Cup		Other^{[A]}		Total	
Club	Season	Division	Apps	Goals	Apps	Goals	Apps	Goals	Apps	Goals	Apps	Goals
Notts County	2012–13	League One	7	1	0	0	0	0	1	0	8	1
Total			7	1	0	0	0	0	1	0	8	1
Career totals			7	1	0	0	0	0	1	0	8	1

A. The "Other" column constitutes appearances (including substitutes) and goals in the Football League Trophy.

== Drug dealing conviction ==
In November 2023, he was sentenced to four and a half years in jail, having been convicted of supplying Class B drugs.
