= Ilkeston F.C. =

Coordinates: 52°59′02.10″N 1°18′00.83″W

Ilkeston
- Full name: Ilkeston Football Club
- Nickname(s): The Robins
- Founded: 2010
- Dissolved: 2017
- Ground: New Manor Ground
- Capacity: 3,029
Home colours	Away colours

Ilkeston Football Club was an English semi-professional football club based at the New Manor Ground in Ilkeston, Derbyshire, England.

== History ==
The club was established in 2010 as the successor club to Ilkeston Town, whose record was expunged on 8 September 2010 as they were subject to a winding up order in the high court over an unpaid £47,000 tax bill. Two months after liquidating, a new club was reformed as Ilkeston F.C. and were admitted into the Northern Premier League Division One South in May 2011.

The club won promotion at the end of its first season by beating Leek Town 2–0 in front of 1,670 supporters in the play off final after finishing 3rd behind runaway winners Grantham Town. The Robins suffered a bad start to their 2012–13 campaign winning only two games in their first seventeen, although a turnaround later on in the season saw them pick up a further thirteen victories which led them to a mid-table finish in their first season in the Northern Premier League Premier Division.

In June 2017 the club was wound-up following a hearing at Liverpool Crown Court, with the club £14,438 in debt. Their last manager was Shaun Goater.

In July 2017 a new club, Ilkeston Town F.C. founded by Notts County chairman Alan Hardy, replacing the liquidated Ilkeston FC, started play at the New Manor Ground in Ilkeston.

== Honours ==
- Northern Premier League Division One South
  - Play-off Winners: 2011–12
- Derbyshire Senior Cup
  - Winners: 2012–13, 2013–14.
