= 2011–12 Notts County F.C. season =

Notts County
2011–12 season
- Chairman: Ray Trew
- Manager: Martin Allen (until 18 February); Keith Curle (from 20 February)
- Stadium: Meadow Lane
- League One: 7th
- FA Cup: Fourth round
- League Cup: First round
- Football League Trophy: Second round
- Top goalscorer: League: Jeff Hughes (13); All: Jeff Hughes (17)
- Highest home attendance: 12,410 v Sheffield Wednesday, 17 March
- Lowest home attendance: 4,471 (league); 3,613 (FA Cup)
- Average home league attendance: 6,807
Home colours	Away colours

The 2011–12 season was Notts County's 123rd year in the English Football League and their second consecutive season in League One.

== Season review ==
=== Kits ===
Fila will become Notts County's kit suppliers this season, after signing a three-year contract. With Nottingham based solicitors, Fraser Brown, sponsor the home shirt and Vision Express sponsoring the away shirt.

=== Pre-season ===
Notts County began their pre-season with two games on the same day. Half of the squad played at newly formed Ilkeston FC, the game finished 2–2, while the other half of the squad won 1–0 at Hucknall Town FC. They then lost 2–0 at Hinkley United before a 1–0 win at Kettering Town. Notts then won 2–1 at Nottinghamshire rivals Mansfield Town before two home games – a 3–2 defeat to Peterborough United and a 1–1 draw with Wolverhampton wanderers. They then lost 2–0 at Corby Town – this the first game at Corby's new home ground - Steel Park. Pre Season finished with a 1–0 defeat at Macclesfield Town and a 3–2 defeat at Maidenhead United.

=== League ===
Notts County began their league campaign with a 3–0 victory on the road at Carlisle United, before losing their first home game of the season to Charlton Athletic. They then beat Tranmere rovers 3–2 thanks to an injury time penalty in a feisty affair at Meadow Lane. This was followed by back to back defeats at Sheffield Wednesday and Preston North End. They then went unbeaten through September, winning 3–1 at home to AFC Bournemouth before heading out to Turin to take on Juventus in a showpiece friendly to open Juventus's new stadium. The game ended in a 1–1 draw. Notts returned to league action with a 2–1 win at home to Walsall before drawing at Exeter City. They ended September with two 2–0 wins at Stevenage and at home to Rochdale. October began with a 3–0 loss at Milton Keynes Dons, before County themselves won 3–0 at home to Hartlepool United. They then won 3–1 at Chesterfield in a local derby. This was followed up by draws at home to Brentford and away to Bury, before going down 4–2 at Colchester United. November saw Notts draw with Wycombe Wanderers, lose at Huddersfield Town, and win at home to Scunthorpe united.

December saw Notts County suffer defeats to Yeovil Town, Leyton Orient, Sheffield United and Oldham Athletic. January signalled the start of Notts County's 150th Anniversary, and they began with a 2–2 draw at home to Huddersfield Town. They then lost to AFC Bournemouth before draws against Milton Keynes Dons and Preston North End. They ended January with a 1–0 win away to Walsall before a 2–1 win over Exeter City. County then lost 3–0 at Hartlepool United, after which manager Martin Allen was sacked, and replaced by former England International Keith Curle. His tenure began with 4 straight wins over Stevenage, Chesterfield, Rochdale and Carlisle United before a 1–1 draw at Tranmere Rovers. However, they followed this up with a shock 4–2 win away at runaway leaders Charlton Athletic. But Notts were brought quickly back down to earth with defeats at home to Sheffield Wednesday and Sheffield United. A draw at Scunthorpe United followed before wins over Oldham Athletic, Leyton Orient, and Yeovil Town moved County right into the battle for the league's final play off spot. A 0–0 draw at Brentford had moved County into pole position to claim that final play off spot, but they suffered a surprise 4–2 defeat at home to Bury. Despite wins over Wycombe Wanderers and Colchester united in their final two games, Notts County missed out on the playoffs on goal difference.

=== League Cup ===
County lost in the first round away from home at their neighbours Nottingham Forest but only after a highly exciting game. the two sides were level at 2–2 after 90 minutes so they went to extra time. Notts went 3–2 up, and were seconds away from victory before Wes Morgan equalised for Forest. County lost on penalties.

=== FA Cup ===
Round 1 saw Notts comfortably beat league two side Accrington Stanley 4–1, before a 2–0 win away at Conference South high flyers Sutton United. A 2–0 win away at Championship club Doncaster Rovers followed before County were knocked out by fellow league one club Stevenage, costing them a home tie with Tottenham Hotspur.

== Match details ==
=== Competition summary ===
Competition	Started round	Current position / round	Final position / round	First match	Last match
Football League One	—	—	7th	6 August 2011	5 May 2012
2011-12 Football League Cup	1st round	—	1st round	9 August 2011	9 August 2011
Football League Trophy	1st round	—	1st round	29 August 2011	29 August 2011
FA Cup	1st round	4th round		12 November 2011	TBD

Updated to match played 4 June 2011
Source: Competitions

=== Pre-season ===
2 July Friendly	Ilkeston	2–2	Notts County	Ilkeston
	Ricketts 26'; Thomas 82'	report	45' Westcarr; 60' Trialist	Stadium: New Manor Ground; Attendance: 1,148

2 July Friendly	Hucknall Town	0–1	Notts County	Hucknall
		report	Trailist	Stadium: Watnall Road

9 July Friendly	Hinckley United	2–0	Notts County	Hinckley
15:00	Clarke 16'; Gray 25'	report		Stadium: Greene King Stadium

13 July Friendly	Kettering Town	0–1	Notts County	Kettering
19:45			Triallist 58'	Stadium: Rockingham Road; Attendance: 407

15 July Friendly	Mansfield Town	1–2	Notts County	Mansfield
19:45	Connor 26'		Bishop 28'; Bencherif 77'	Stadium: Field Mill; Attendance: 2,353

20 July Friendly	Notts County	2–3	Peterborough United	Nottingham
19:45	Westcarr 48'; Bencherif 62'		McCann 22'; Rowe 27'; Boyd 37'	Stadium: Meadow Lane; Attendance: 1,248

23 July Friendly	Notts County	1–1	Wolverhampton Wanderers	Nottingham
15:00	Bishop 90'		Jarvis 28'	Stadium: Meadow Lane; Attendance: 2,840

25 July Friendly	Corby Town	2–0	Notts County	Corby
19:45	Rogan 57'; Ives 59'			Stadium: Rockingham Triangle

30 July Friendly	Macclesfield Town	1–0	Notts County	Macclesfield
15:00	Fairhurst 57'			Stadium: Moss Rose; Attendance: 572

1 August Friendly	Maidenhead United	3–2	Notts County	Maidenhead
19:45	Williams 36', 69'; Worsfold 78'		Hollis 67'; Dixon 73'	Stadium: York Road

=== League One ===
==== Standings ====
Pos	Team	Pld	W	D	L	GF	GA	GD	Pts	Promotion, qualification or relegation
5	Milton Keynes Dons	46	22	14	10	84	47	+37	80	Qualification for League One play-offs (Note: Four teams play for one spot and promotion to Football League Championship.)
6	Stevenage	46	18	19	9	69	44	+25	73	Qualification for League One play-offs
7	Notts County	46	21	10	15	75	63	+12	73	
8	Carlisle United	46	18	15	13	65	66	−1	69	
9	Brentford	46	18	13	15	63	52	+11	67	

Updated to match(es) played on 5 May 2012. Source: BBC Sport
Rules for classification: 1) Points; 2) Goal difference; 3) Number of goals scored

==== Results summary ====
Overall								Home						Away					
Pld	W	D	L	GF	GA	GD	Pts	W	D	L	GF	GA	GD	W	D	L	GF	GA	GD
46	21	10	15	75	62	+13	73	13	5	5	42	28	+14	8	5	10	33	34	−1

Last updated: 5 May 2012.

==== Result round by round ====
Round	1	2	3	4	5	6	7	8	9	10	11	12	13	14	15	16	17	18	19	20	21	22	23	24	25	26	27	28	29	30	31	32	33	34	35	36	37	38	39	40	41	42	43	44	45	46
Ground	A	H	H	A	A	H	H	A	A	H	A	H	A	H	A	A	H	A	H	A	H	A	A	H	A	H	H	A	H	A	H	H	A	H	A	A	H	H	A	H	A	H	A	H	A	H
Result	W	L	W	L	L	W	W	D	W	W	L	W	W	D	D	L	D	L	W	L	L	L	L	D	L	D	D	W	W	L	W	W	W	W	D	W	L	L	D	W	W	W	D	L	W	W
Position	2	7	4	9	15	11	9	9	7	5	8	6	3	4	5	6	6	6	6	8	9	9	10	11	14	14	13	11	9	11	10	8	7	6	6	6	6	8	8	7	7	6	6	7	7	7

Updated to match(es) played on 5 May 2012. Source: Fixtures & Table
A = Away; H = Home; W = Win; D = Draw; L = Loss

==== Matches ====
6 August 2011 1	Carlisle United	0–3	Notts County	Carlisle
15:00			J. Hughes 13'; Zoko 32' (o.g.); L. Hughes 45+3'	Stadium: Brunton Park; Attendance: 5,941

13 August 2011 2	Notts County	1–2	Charlton Athletic	Nottingham
15:00	Montano 60'		Wagstaff 35'; Hayes 45+1'	Stadium: Meadow Lane; Attendance: 6,397

16 August 2011 3	Notts County	3–2	Tranmere Rovers	Nottingham
19:45	Kelly 52'; Pearce 60'; J Hughes 90+7' (pen.)		Walsh 10'; Ladabie 80'	Stadium: Meadow Lane; Attendance: 4,883

20 August 2011 4	Sheffield Wednesday	2–1	Notts County	Sheffield
15:00	Bennett 53'; Madine 68'		J Hughes 10' (pen.)	Stadium: Hillsborough Stadium; Attendance: 16,979

27 August 2011 5	Preston North End	2–0	Notts County	Preston
15:00	McLean 83'; Turner 86'			Stadium: Deepdale; Attendance: 10,759

3 September 2011 6	Notts County	3–1	Bournemouth	Nottingham
15:00	L. Hughes 1'; Pearce 78'; Montano 86'		Pugh 71'	Stadium: Meadow Lane; Attendance: 5,510

10 September 2011 7	Notts County	2–1	Walsall	Nottingham
15:00	L. Hughes 38'; Montano 65'		Butler 61'	Stadium: Meadow Lane; Attendance: 6,218

13 September 2011 8	Exeter City	1–1	Notts County	Exeter
19:45	Sheehan 8' (o.g.)		Burgess 16'	Stadium: St James Park; Attendance: 3,474

17 September 2011 9	Stevenage	0–2	Notts County	Stevenage
15:00			L Hughes 45+3'; Burgess 50'	Stadium: Broadhall Way; Attendance: 3,434

24 September 2011 10	Notts County	2–0	Rochdale	Nottingham
15:00	L Hughes 35'; Sodje 90+4'			Stadium: Meadow Lane; Attendance: 6,199

1 October 2011 11	Milton Keynes Dons	3–0	Notts County	Milton Keynes
15:00	Balanta 11'; Morrison 82'; Powell 83'		Kelly (red card) 4'	Stadium: Stadium:mk; Attendance: 7,620

9 October 2011 12	Notts County	3–0	Hartlepool United	Nottingham
15:00	Hawley 29', 55'; Montano 90+1'			Stadium: Meadow Lane; Attendance: 6,172

15 October 2011 13	Chesterfield	1–3	Notts County	Chesterfield
15:00	Westcarr 52'		Burgess 21'; Judge 38'; Talbot 88' (o.g.)	Stadium: B2net Stadium; Attendance: 8,342

22 October 2011 14	Notts County	1–1	Brentford	Nottingham
15:00	J Hughes 38' (pen.)		Donaldson 46'	Stadium: Meadow Lane; Attendance: 6,735

25 October 2011 15	Bury	2–2	Notts County	Bury
19:45	Bisho 5'; Coke 55' (pen.)		J Hughes 37' (pen.), 80' (pen.)	Stadium: Gigg Lane; Attendance: 2,917

29 October 2011 16	Colchester United	4–2	Notts County	Colchester
15:00	Wordsworth 49'; Antonio 66'; Ian Henderson 71'; Odejayi 74'		Sodje 58'; Heath 90+3' (o.g.)	Stadium: Colchester Community Stadium; Attendance: 3,585

5 November 2011 17	Notts County	1–1	Wycombe Wanderers	Nottingham
15:00	Burges 1'		Grant 90+2'	Stadium: Meadow Lane; Attendance: 7,664

19 November 2011 18	Huddersfield Town	2–1	Notts County	Huddersfield
15:00	Rhodes 46', 65'		Bishop 90+4'	Stadium: Kirklees Stadium; Attendance: 13,227

26 November 2011 19	Notts County	3–2	Scunthorpe United	Nottingham
15:00	Pearce 39'; J Hughes 65'; Kelly 82'		Barcham 44'; Grant 53'; Oliver Norwood (red card) 57'	Stadium: Meadow Lane; Attendance: 6,120

10 December 2011 20	Yeovil Town	1–0	Notts County	Yeovil
15:00	Williams 88'			Stadium: Huish Park; Attendance: 3,663

17 December 2011 21	Notts County	1–2	Leyton Orient	Nottingham
15:00	J Hughes 86'		Dawson 44'; Téhoué 85'; McSweeney (red card) 90+3'	Stadium: Meadow Lane; Attendance: 5,830

27 December 2011 22	Sheffield United	2–1	Notts County	Sheffield
14:15	Flynn 31'; Sheehan 51' (o.g.)		Judge 17'; Demontagnac (red card) 90+5'	Stadium: Bramall Lane; Attendance: 20,538

31 December 2011 23	Oldham Athletic	3–2	Notts County	Oldham
15:00	Scapuzzi 27'; Morais 70'; Diamond 86'		J Hughes 10'; Bishop 39'	Stadium: Boundary Park; Attendance: 3,623

2 January 2012 24	Notts County	2–2	Huddersfield Town	Nottingham
15:00	J Hughes 72' (pen.); L Hughes 84'		Roberts 52'; Rhodes 58'	Stadium: Meadow Lane; Attendance: 8,914

14 January 2012 25	Bournemouth	1–1	Notts County	Bournemouth
15:00	Thomas 21'; Fogden 83'		Bencherif 5'	Stadium: Dean Court; Attendance: 6,529

21 January 2012 26	Notts County	1–1	Milton Keynes Dons	Nottingham
15:00	J Hughes 88' (pen.)		Flanagan 26'	Stadium: Meadow Lane; Attendance: 6,123

24 January 2012 27	Notts County	0–0	Preston North End	Nottingham
19:45				Stadium: Meadow Lane; Attendance: 4,901

31 January 2012 28	Walsall	0–1	Notts County	Walsall
19:45			L Hughes 3'	Stadium: Bescot Stadium; Attendance: 3,647

14 February 2012 29	Notts County	2–1	Exeter City	Nottingham
19:45	L Hughes 8'; J Hughes 28' (pen.)		Bennett 14'	Stadium: Meadow Lane; Attendance: 4,741

18 February 2012 30	Hartlepool United	3–0	Notts County	Hartlepool
15:00	Sweeney 37', 53'; Monkhouse 78'			Stadium: Victoria Park; Attendance: 4,718

22 February 2012 31	Notts County	1–0	Stevenage	Nottingham
19:45	J Hughes 90'			Stadium: Meadow Lane; Attendance: 5,733

25 February 2012 32	Notts County	1–0	Chesterfield	Nottingham
15:00	Forte 80'			Stadium: Meadow Lane; Attendance: 8,257

28 February 2012 33	Rochdale	0–1	Notts County	Rochdale
19:45			Bencherif 45'	Stadium: Spotland Stadium; Attendance: 2,326

3 March 2012 34	Notts County	2–0	Carlisle United	Nottingham
15:00	Forte 33'; Sheehan 35'			Stadium: Meadow Lane; Attendance: 6,451

7 March 2012 35	Tranmere Rovers	1–1	Notts County	Birkenhead
19:45	Walsh 90+3'		Stewart 5'	Stadium: Prenton Park; Attendance: 4,565

10 March 2012 36	Charlton Athletic	2–4	Notts County	Charlton, London
15:00	Wright-Phillips 50'; Wagstaff 55'		Judge 16'; Forte 18', 35', 40'	Stadium: The Valley; Attendance: 17,033

17 March 2012 37	Notts County	1–2	Sheffield Wednesday	Nottingham
15:00	Sam 88'		Lowe 52'; Madine 66'	Stadium: Meadow Lane; Attendance: 12,410

20 March 2012 38	Notts County	2–5	Sheffield United	Nottingham
19:45	Judge 77'; Bishop (yellow card) 80' (yellow-red card); Kelly 90'		Quinn 16'; Evans 22'; Lowton 27'; Collins 45'; Williamson 89'	Stadium: Meadow Lane; Attendance: 9,468

24 March 2012 39	Scunthorpe United	0–0	Notts County	Scunthorpe
15:00				Stadium: Glanford Park; Attendance: 4,619

31 March 2012 40	Notts County	1–0	Oldham Athletic	Nottingham
15:00	Sheehan 89'			Stadium: Meadow Lane; Attendance: 6,326

6 April 2012 41	Leyton Orient	0–3	Notts County	Leyton, London
15:00			Stewart 70'; J Hughes 76'; Sam 90'	Stadium: Brisbane Road; Attendance: 4,016

9 April 2012 42	Notts County	3–1	Yeovil Town	Nottingham
15:00	Sam 37', 87', 90'		Franks 79'	Stadium: Meadow Lane; Attendance: 5,852

14 April 2012 43	Brentford	0–0	Notts County	Brentford, London
15:00				Stadium: Griffin Park; Attendance: 7,079

21 April 2012 44	Notts County	2–4	Bury	Nottingham
12:30	Coke 46' (o.g.); Edwards 79'		Worrall 42'; Grella 49', 67'; Carrington 90'	Stadium: Meadow Lane; Attendance: 6,732

28 April 2012 45	Wycombe Wanderers	3–4	Notts County	High Wycombe
15:00	Bloomfield 1'; Basey 17' (pen.); Beavon 68'		Bogdanović 3'; Judge 40', 90'; Adebola 89'	Stadium: Adams Park; Attendance: 5,947

5 May 2012 46	Notts County	4–1	Colchester United	Nottingham
15:00	J Hughes 23'; Bogdanović 33'; Judge 41'; Freeman 51'		Wordsworth 90'	Stadium: Meadow Lane; Attendance: 8,942

=== FA Cup ===
12 November 2011 1	Notts County	4–1	Accrington Stanley	Nottingham
19:45	Hawley 34', 89'; Judge 47'; Sheehan 89'		Joyce 85'	Stadium: Meadow Lane; Attendance: 3,613

4 December 2011 2	Sutton United	0–2	Notts County	Sutton, London
19:45	Murray (red card) 85'		J Hughes 35', 90+1'	Stadium: Gander Green Lane; Attendance: 3,704

7 January 2012 3	Doncaster Rovers	0–2	Notts County	Doncaster
15:00			J Hughes 37', 70' (pen.)	Stadium: Keepmoat Stadium; Attendance: 9,353

28 January 2012 4	Stevenage	1–0	Notts County	Stevenage
15:00	Stewart 12' (o.g.)			Stadium: Broadhall Way; Attendance: 4,439

=== League Cup ===
9 August 2011 1	Nottingham Forest	3–3 (a.e.t.) (4–3 p)	Notts County	Nottingham
19:45	McGugan 30'; Findley 56'; Morgan 120+3'		16' Edwards; 76' Westcarr; 96' L. Hughes	Stadium: City Ground; Attendance: 21,606 (6,164 Notts supporters)
	Penalties
	Greening (penalty missed); Marcus Tudgay (penalty scored); Garner (penalty scored); Findley (penalty scored); Boateng (penalty missed); Chambers (penalty scored)		(penalty scored) Westcarr; (penalty scored) Karl Hawley; (penalty missed) Bencherif; (penalty scored) Sheehan; (penalty missed) L. Hughes; (penalty missed) Bishop

=== Football League Trophy ===
4 October 2011 Second round	Notts County	1–3	Chesterfield	Nottingham
19:45	Hawley 43'	Report	Johnson (red card) 22'; Randall 64'; Morgan 68'; Bowery 77'	Stadium: Meadow Lane; Attendance: 2,293; Referee: David Webb

== Squad ==
Note: Flags indicate national team as defined under FIFA eligibility rules; some limited exceptions apply. Players may hold more than one non-FIFA nationality.

No.	Pos.	Nation	Player
1	GK	ENG	Rob Burch
2	DF	ENG	Julian Kelly
3	DF	IRL	Alan Sheehan
4	DF	ENG	Mike Edwards (captain)
5	DF	ENG	Krystian Pearce
6	MF	ALG	Hamza Bencherif
7	MF	ENG	Ishmel Demontagnac
8	FW	ENG	Karl Hawley (on loan at Crawley Town)
9	FW	ENG	Lee Hughes
10	MF	ENG	Neal Bishop
11	MF	NIR	Jeff Hughes
12	DF	ENG	Jude Stirling
14	MF	IRL	Alan Judge
15	MF	ENG	Ricky Ravenhill
16	DF	ENG	Stephen Hunt
17	GK	ENG	Stuart Nelson
18	DF	NGA	Sam Sodje

No.	Pos.	Nation	Player
19	MF	ENG	Charlie Allen
20	DF	WAL	Kieron Freeman (on loan from Nottingham Forest)
21	GK	ENG	Liam Mitchell
22	FW	IRL	Ben Burgess (on loan at Cheltenham Town)
23	DF	ENG	Jon Harley
24	DF	ENG	Liam Chilvers
25	MF	ENG	John Spicer
26	DF	ENG	Hayden Hollis (on loan at Darlington)
27	MF	ENG	George Nicholas (on loan at Lewes)
29	MF	ENG	Curtis Thompson
30	FW	NGA	Dele Adebola (on loan from Hull City)
31	MF	ENG	Gavin Mahon
32	MF	ENG	Lloyd Sam (on loan from Leeds United)
33	GK	GER	Fabian Speiss
35	MF	JAM	Damion Stewart (on loan from Bristol City)
36	MF	ENG	Louis Harris (on loan from Wolverhampton Wanderers)
37	MF	ENG	Nico Yennaris (on loan from Arsenal)
40	FW	MLT	Daniel Bogdanović (on loan from Blackpool)

=== Detailed overview ===
No.	Name	Nat.	Place of birth	Date of birth	Club apps.	Club goals	Int. caps	Int. goals	Previous club	Date joined	Fee
1	Rob Burch	(England)	Yeovil	8 October 1983	19	0	–	–	Lincoln City	8 June 2010	Free
2	Julian Kelly	(England)	London	6 September 1989	–	–	–	–	Reading	2 June 2011	Free
3	Alan Sheehan	(Republic of Ireland)	Athlone	14 September 1986	–	–	–	–	Swindon Town	3 June 2011	Free
4	Mike Edwards	(England)	Beverley	25 April 1980	270	20	–	–	Grimsby Town	26 May 2004	Free
5	Krystian Pearce	(England)	Birmingham	5 January 1990	35	2	–	–	Birmingham City	26 July 2010	Free
6	Hamza Bencherif	(Algeria)	Paris (France)	9 February 1988	–	–	–	–	Macclesfield Town	23 June 2011	Free
7	Ishmel Demontagnac	(England)	London	15 June 1988	–	–	–	–	Blackpool	27 May 2011	Free
8	Karl Hawley	(England)	Walsall	6 December 1981	100	4	–	–	Preston North End	3 August 2009	Undisclosed
9	Lee Hughes	(England)	Smethwick	22 May 1976	82	50	–	–	Oldham Athletic	22 June 2009	Free
10	Neal Bishop	(England)	Stockton-on-Tees	7 August 1981	102	3	–	–	Barnet	1 July 2009	Undisclosed
11	Jeff Hughes	(Northern Ireland)	Larne	29 May 1985	–	–	–	–	Bristol Rovers	28 June 2011	Free
12	Jude Stirling	(England)	London	29 May 1982	–	–	–	–	Milton Keynes Dons	2 June 2011	Free
14	Alan Judge	(Republic of Ireland)	Dublin	11 November 1988	21	1	–	–	Blackburn Rovers	14 January 2011	Undisclosed
15	Jonathan Forte	(Barbados)	Sheffield	25 July 1986	18	8	2	0	Southampton	27 January 2012	Loan
16	Stephen Hunt	(England)	Southampton	11 November 1984	136	6	–	–	Colchester United	19 June 2006	Free
17	Stuart Nelson	(England)	Stroud	17 September 1981	38	0	–	–	Aberdeen	1 August 2010	Undisclosed
18	Sam Sodje	(Nigeria)	London (England)	25 May 1979	11	1	7	0	Skoda Xanthi	1 November 2010	Free
19	Charlie Allen	(England)	Reading	24 March 1992	–	–	–	–	Dagenham & Redbridge	29 June 2011	Free
20	Kieron Freeman	(Wales)	Nottingham	21 March 1992	–	–	–	–	Nottingham Forest	13 January 2012	Loan
21	Liam Mitchell	(England)	Nottingham	18 September 1992	–	–	–	–	N/A	1 July 2011	Trainee
22	Ben Burgess	(Republic of Ireland)	Buxton (England)	9 November 1981	18	1	–	–	Blackpool	2 July 2010	Free
23	Jon Harley	(England)	Maidstone	26 September 1979	47	0	–	–	Watford	1 August 2010	Free
24	Liam Chilvers	(England)	Chelmsford	6 November 1981	27	0	–	–	Preston North End	23 July 2010	Free
25	John Spicer	(England)	London	13 September 1983	27	3	–	–	Doncaster Rovers	2 July 2010	Free
26	Haydn Hollis	(England)		14 October 1992	–	–	–	–	N/A	1 July 2011	Free
27	George Nicholas	(England)		19 December 1992	–	–	–	–	N/A	1 July 2011	Free
30	Dele Adebola	(Nigeria)	Lagos	23 June 1975	-	-	-	-	Hull City	20 March 2012	Loan
31	Gavin Mahon	(England)	Birmingham	2 January 1977	-	-	-	-	Queens Park Rangers	25 August 2011	Free
32	Lloyd Sam	(England)	Leeds	27 September 1987	-	-	-	-	Leeds United	15 March 2012	Loan
33	Fabian Speiss	(Germany)
35	Damion Stewart	(Jamaica)		18 August 1980	-	-	-	-	Bristol City	5 January 2012	Loan
36	Louis Harris	(England)	Wolverhampton		-	-	-	-	Wolverhampton Wanderers	22 March 2012	Loan
37	Nico Yennaris	(England)	Leytonstone		-	-	-	-	Arsenal	23 March 2012	Loan
40	Daniel Bogdanović	(Malta)	Misrata (Libya)	26 March 1980	-	-	-	-	Blackpool	22 March 2012	Loan
	Tyrell Waite	(England)	Derbyshire		-	-	-	-	Ilkeston	21 March 2012	Undisclosed

=== Statistics ===
As of 5 May 2012

No.	Pos	Nat	Player	Total		League One		FA Cup		League Cup		League Trophy	
No.	Pos	Nat	Player	Apps	Goals	Apps	Goals	Apps	Goals	Apps	Goals	Apps	Goals
1	GK	(England) ENG	Robert Burch	0	0	0+0	0	0+0	0	0+0	0	0+0	0
2	DF	(England) ENG	Julian Kelly	38	3	29+3	3	3+0	0	3+0	0	0+0	0
3	DF	(Republic of Ireland) IRL	Alan Sheehan	45	4	39+0	2	3+0	1	3+0	1	0+0	0
4	DF	(England) ENG	Mike Edwards	35	1	27+3	1	1+1	0	1+1	0	1+0	0
5	DF	(England) ENG	Krystian Pearce	32	3	25+2	3	2+0	0	2+0	0	1+0	0
6	MF	(Algeria) ALG	Hamza Bencherif	26	2	14+6	2	0+2	0	1+2	0	1+0	0
7	MF	(England) ENG	Ishmel Demontagnac	22	0	2+15	0	0+2	0	0+2	0	1+0	0
8	FW	(England) ENG	Karl Hawley	32	7	15+11	2	2+0	2	3+0	2	1+0	1
9	FW	(England) ENG	Lee Hughes	43	10	28+12	10	1+0	0	1+0	0	0+1	0
10	MF	(England) ENG	Neal Bishop	47	2	41+0	2	3+0	0	3+0	0	0+0	0
11	MF	(Northern Ireland) NIR	Jeff Hughes	51	19	44+1	13	3+0	2	3+0	4	0+0	0
12	DF	(England) ENG	Jude Stirling	10	0	0+8	0	0+1	0	0+1	0	0+0	0
14	MF	(Republic of Ireland) IRL	Alan Judge	50	9	40+3	7	3+0	1	3+0	1	1+0	0
15	FW	(Barbados) BRB	Jonathan Forte	11	5	6+4	5	1+0	0	0+0	0	0+0	0
16	DF	(England) ENG	Stephen Hunt	0	0	0+0	0	0+0	0	0+0	0	0+0	0
17	GK	(England) ENG	Stuart Nelson	53	0	46+0	0	3+0	0	3+0	0	1+0	0
18	DF	(Nigeria) NGA	Sam Sodje	20	3	7+9	3	1+1	0	1+0	0	0+1	0
19	MF	(England) ENG	Charlie Allen	12	0	4+5	0	0+1	0	0+1	0	1+0	0
20	DF	(Wales) WAL	Kieron Freeman	19	1	18+1	1	0+0	0	0+0	0	0+0	0
21	GK	(England) ENG	Liam Mitchell	0	0	0+0	0	0+0	0	0+0	0	0+0	0
22	FW	(Republic of Ireland) IRL	Ben Burgess	33	4	20+8	4	2+0	0	2+1	0	0+0	0
23	DF	(England) ENG	Jon Harley	16	0	11+3	0	0+0	0	0+1	0	1+0	0
24	DF	(England) ENG	Liam Chilvers	19	0	16+1	0	1+0	0	1+0	0	0+0	0
25	MF	(England) ENG	John Spicer	2	0	0+1	0	0+0	0	0+0	0	1+0	0
26	DF	(England) ENG	Hayden Hollis	1	0	1+0	0	0+0	0	0+0	0	0+0	0
27	MF	(England) ENG	George Nicholas	0	0	0+0	0	0+0	0	0+0	0	0+0	0
29	MF	(England) ENG	Curtis Thompson	1	0	0+0	0	0+0	0	0+0	0	0+1	0
30	FW	(Nigeria) NGA	Dele Adebola	6	1	3+3	1	0+0	0	0+0	0	0+0	0
31	MF	(England) ENG	Gavin Mahon	35	0	22+8	0	3+0	0	2+0	0	0+0	0
32	MF	(England) ENG	Lloyd Sam	10	5	8+2	5	0+0	0	0+0	0	0+0	0
33	GK	(Germany) GER	Fabian Speiss	1	0	0+1	0	0+0	0	0+0	0	0+0	0
35	DF	(Jamaica) JAM	Damion Stewart	19	2	16+1	2	1+0	0	1+0	0	0+0	0
36	MF	(England) ENG	Louis Harris	2	0	1+1	0	0+0	0	0+0	0	0+0	0
37	MF	(England) ENG	Nico Yennaris	2	0	2+0	0	0+0	0	0+0	0	0+0	0
40	FW	(Malta) MLT	Daniel Bogdanović	8	2	8+0	2	0+0	0	0+0	0	0+0	0
--	FW	(England) ENG	Tyrell Waite	0	0	0+0	0	0+0	0	0+0	0	0+0	0
Players played for Notts County this season but who have left the club:
	FW	(England) ENG	Craig Westcarr	5	1	2+2	0	0+0	0	0+1	1	0+0	0
	MF	(England) ENG	Femi Orenuga	2	0	0+2	0	0+0	0	0+0	0	0+0	0
	MF	(England) ENG	Ricky Ravenhill	8	0	6+0	0	0+0	0	1+0	0	1+0	0
	FW	(Colombia) COL	Cristian Montaño	16	4	5+10	4	0+0	0	0+1	0	0+0	0

==== Goalscoring record ====
N	P	Name	League One	FA Cup	League Cup	League Trophy	Total
11	MF	Jeff Hughes	13	4	0	0	17
9	FW	Lee Hughes	10	0	1	0	11
14	MF	Alan Judge	7	1	0	0	8
8	FW	Karl Hawley	2	2	0	1	5
15	FW	Jonathan Forte	5	0	0	0	5
32	MF	Lloyd Sam	5	0	0	0	5
22	FW	Ben Burgess	4	0	0	0	4
30	MF	Cristian Montaño	4	0	0	0	4
2	DF	Julian Kelly	3	0	0	0	3
5	DF	Krystian Pearce	3	0	0	0	3
3	DF	Alan Sheehan	2	1	0	0	3
18	DF	Sam Sodje	3	0	0	0	3
Own Goals			3	0	0	0	3
6	MF	Hamza Bencherif	2	0	0	0	2
10	MF	Neal Bishop	2	0	0	0	2
40	FW	Daniel Bogdanović	2	0	0	0	2
4	DF	Mike Edwards	1	0	1	0	2
35	DF	Damion Stewart	2	0	0	0	2
30	FW	Dele Adebola	1	0	0	0	1
20	DF	Kieron Freeman	1	0	0	0	1
~~20~~	FW	Craig Westcarr	1	0	0	0	1
Totals			76	8	2	1	89

==== Disciplinary record ====
No.	Pos.	Name	League One		FA Cup		League Cup		League Trophy		Total				
No.	Pos.	Name	10	MF	Neal Bishop	7	1	1	0	1	0	0	0	9	1
9	FW	Lee Hughes	7	1	1	0	0	0	0	0	8	1			
3	DF	Alan Sheehan	10	0	1	0	0	0	0	0	11	0			
5	DF	Krystian Pearce	7	0	1	0	1	0	0	0	9	0			
7	MF	Ishmel Demontagnac	1	1	0	0	0	0	1	0	2	1			
11	MF	Jeff Hughes	6	0	0	0	1	0	0	0	7	0			
2	DF	Julian Kelly	2	1	0	0	0	0	0	0	2	1			
14	MF	Alan Judge	6	0	0	0	0	0	0	0	6	0			
18	DF	Sam Sodje	5	0	0	0	0	0	0	0	5	0			
6	MF	Hamza Bencherif	3	0	0	0	0	0	0	0	3	0			
4	DF	Mike Edwards	2	0	0	0	1	0	0	0	3	0			
23	DF	Jon Harley	3	0	0	0	0	0	0	0	3	0			
17	GK	Stuart Nelson	3	0	0	0	0	0	0	0	3	0			
~~15~~	MF	Ricky Ravenhill	2	0	0	0	1	0	0	0	3	0			
22	FW	Ben Burgess	2	0	0	0	0	0	0	0	2	0			
24	DF	Liam Chilvers	2	0	0	0	0	0	0	0	2	0			
20	DF	Kieron Freeman	2	0	0	0	0	0	0	0	2	0			
30	FW	Cristian Montaño	2	0	0	0	0	0	0	0	2	0			
32	MF	Lloyd Sam	2	0	0	0	0	0	0	0	2	0			
35	DF	Damion Stewart	2	0	0	0	0	0	0	0	2	0			
18	DF	Sam Sodje	1	0	0	0	0	0	0	0	1	0			
12	DF	Jude Stirling	1	0	0	0	0	0	0	0	1	0			
Totals			77	4	4	0	5	0	1	0	87	4			

== Transfers ==
=== In ===
No.	Pos.	Nat.	Name	Age	EU	Moving from	Type	Transfer window	Ends	Transfer fee	Source
26	DF	(England)	Hollis	18	EU	Youth system	Promoted	Summer	2012	N/A	
21	GK	(England)	Mitchell	18	EU	Youth system	Promoted	Summer	2012	N/A	
27	MF	(England)	Nicholas	18	EU	Youth system	Promoted	Summer	2012	N/A	
28	MF	(England)	Whitley	18	EU	Youth system	Promoted	Summer	2012	N/A	
7	MF	(England)	Demontagnac	22	EU	Blackpool	Free Transfer	Summer	2012	Free	
2	DF	(England)	Kelly	21	EU	Reading	Transfer	Summer	2013	Free	
12	DF	(England)	Stirling	28	EU	Milton Keynes Dons	Free Transfer	Summer	2013	Free	
3	DF	(Republic of Ireland)	Sheehan	24	EU	Swindon Town	Free Transfer	Summer	2013	Free	
6	MF	(Algeria) (France)	Bencherif	23	EU	Macclesfield Town	Free Transfer	Summer	2013	Free	
11	MF	(Northern Ireland)	J Hughes	26	EU	Bristol Rovers	Free Transfer	Summer	2013	Free	
19	MF	(England)	Allen	19	EU	Dagenham & Redbridge	Free Transfer	Summer	2012	Free	
30	FW	(Colombia)	Montaño	19		West Ham United	Loan	Summer	2011	One-Month Loan	
31	MF	(England)	Mahon	34	EU	Free agent	Free Transfer	Summer	2012	Free	
29	MF	(England)	Curtis Thompson	--	EU	Youth system	Promoted		2013	Youth system	
20	MF	(England)	Orenuga	18	EU	Everton	Loan		2011	One-Month loan	
35	DF	(Jamaica)	Stewart	31	EU	Bristol City	Loan	Winter	2012	Season Long Loan	
20	DF	(Wales) (England)	Freeman	19	EU	Nottingham Forest	Loan	Winter	2012	One-month Loan	
15	FW	(Barbados) (England)	Forte	25	EU	Southampton	Loan	Winter	2012	Season Long Loan	
30	FW	(Colombia)	Montaño	20		West Ham United	Loan		2012	One Month Loan	
32	MF	(England)	Sam	27	EU	Leeds United	Loan		2012	Season Long Loan	
30	FW	(Nigeria)	Adebola	36	EU	Hull City	Loan		2012	Season Long Loan	
40	FW	(Malta) (Libya)	Bogdanović	31	EU	Blackpool	Loan		2012	Season Long Loan	
36	MF	(England)	Harris	17	EU	Wolverhampton Wanderers	Loan		2012	Season Long Loan	
	FW	(England)	Waite	17	EU	Ilkeston	Transfer			Undisclosed	
37	MF	(England)	Yennaris	18	EU	Arsenal	Loan		2012	Season Long Loan	

=== Out ===
No.	Pos.	Name	Country	Age	Type	Moving to	Transfer window	Transfer fee	Apps	Goals	Source
29	FW	Brandy	(England)	22	Released		Summer	n/a	9	0	
37	FW	Demba-Nyrén	(The Gambia)	31	Released		Summer	n/a	9	1	
19	FW	Gow	(Scotland)	28	Released		Summer	n/a	18	1	
23	GK	Gróf	(Hungary)	22	Released	Walsall	Summer	Free	0	0	
7	FW	Smith	(Scotland)	24	Released	Queen of the South (Scotland)	Summer	n/a	17	1	
5	DF	Lee	(England)	33	Free Transfer	Darlington	Summer	Free	55	4	
6	DF	Thompson	(Republic of Ireland)	29	Free Transfer	Mansfield Town	Summer	Free	115	2	
20	FW	Westcarr	(England)	26	Transfer	Chesterfield	Summer	£70,000 ^{1}	79	21	
24	DF	Chilvers	(England)	29	Loan	Port Vale		Loan	37	1	
26	DF	Harley	(England)	32	Loan	Rotherham United		One-Month Loan	40	0	
29	MF	Thompson	(England)	18	Loan	Lincoln City		One-Month Loan	2	0	
15	MF	Ravenhill	(England)	30	Transfer	Bradford City	Winter	Free	97	3	
8	FW	Hawley	(England)	30	Loan	Crawley Town	Winter	Season Long Loan	98	9	
28	MF	Whitley	(England)	19	Released		Winter	N/A	0	0	
22	FW	Burgess	(Republic of Ireland) (England)	30	Loan	Cheltenham Town		Season Loan Loan	49	5	
26	DF	Hollis	(England)	19	Loan	Darlington		Season Long Loan	0	0	

EU = if holds or not a European Union passport; Country: when 2 flags, 1st flag = country that plays for internationally, 2nd flag = country of birth; N = number on jersey; P = Position (for position name, pause mouse pointer on abbreviation); Name = Name on jersey (for more extensive name, pause mouse pointer on name); Age = age on the day of the signing; Moving from = only indicate the club the player was playing before start playing for this club in this season, for the type of the moving see Status column; Moving to = only indicates the club the player is going to play next, for the type of the moving see Status column; Ends = when the player's current contract ends; n/a = Not applicable.

Notes

^{1}_{Although officially undisclosed, The Star reported the fee to be around £70,000}

=== Contracts ===
No.	Pos.	Nat.	Name	Age	Status	Contract length	Expiry date	Source
10	MF	(England)	Bishop	29	Signed	2 years	June 2013	
9	FW	(England)	Hughes	35	Signed	1 years	June 2013	
31	MF	(England)	Mahon	34	Signed	1.5 years	June 2013	

== Awards ==
- Supporters' Player of the Year: Alan Judge
- Players' Player of the Year: Alan Judge
- Manager's Player of the Year: Jeff Hughes
- Golden Boot: Jeff Hughes
- Goal of the Year: Lee Hughes
- Community Award: Mike Edwards
- Youth Players' Player of the Year: Fabian Spiess
- Youth Manager's Player of the Year: Fabian Spiess
- Youth Golden Boot: Jonathan Boyack
- Youth Goal of the Year: Jonathan Boyack
