= 2012–13 Notts County F.C. season =

Notts County
2012–13 season
- Chairman: Ray Trew
- Manager: Keith Curle (until 3 Feb.); Chris Kiwomya (from 4 Feb.)
- League One: 12th
- FA Cup: Second round (eliminated by Rotherham United)
- League Cup: First round (eliminated by Bradford City)
- League Trophy: Second round (eliminated by Sheffield United)
- Top goalscorer: League: Jamal Campbell-Ryce (8); Alan Judge (8); All: Yoann Arquin (9)
- Highest home attendance: 7,608 (vs. Coventry City)
- Lowest home attendance: League:3,409; All: 2,082 (vs. Sheffield United)
- Average home league attendance: League:5,522; All: 5,213
| Home colours | Away colours | Third colours |

The 2012–13 season was Notts County Football Club's 124th year in the Football League and their third consecutive season in the third tier of English football.

As the club languished in mid-table, development squad coach Chris Kiwomya replaced Keith Curle with first-team duties.

== League One ==
=== Standings ===
| Pos | Team | Pld | W | D | L | GF | GA | GD | Pts |
|---|---|---|---|---|---|---|---|---|---|
| 10 | Crawley Town | 46 | 18 | 14 | 14 | 59 | 58 | +1 | 68 |
| 11 | Tranmere Rovers | 46 | 19 | 10 | 17 | 58 | 48 | +10 | 67 |
| 12 | Notts County | 46 | 16 | 17 | 13 | 61 | 49 | +12 | 65 |
| 13 | Crewe Alexandra | 46 | 18 | 10 | 18 | 54 | 62 | −8 | 64 |
| 14 | Preston North End | 46 | 14 | 17 | 15 | 54 | 49 | +5 | 59 |

Updated to match(es) played on 27 April 2013. Source: BBC Sport
Rules for classification: 1) Points; 2) Goal difference; 3) Number of goals scored

==== Results summary ====
| Overall | | | | | | | | Home | | | | | | Away | | | | | |
| Pld | W | D | L | GF | GA | GD | Pts | W | D | L | GF | GA | GD | W | D | L | GF | GA | GD |
|---|---|---|---|---|---|---|---|---|---|---|---|---|---|---|---|---|---|---|---|
| 46 | 16 | 17 | 13 | 61 | 49 | +12 | 65 | 9 | 6 | 8 | 32 | 26 | +6 | 7 | 11 | 5 | 29 | 23 | +6 |

Last updated: 2 May 2013.

==== Results round by round ====
| Round | 1 | 2 | 3 | 4 | 5 | 6 | 7 | 8 | 9 | 10 | 11 | 12 | 13 | 14 | 15 | 16 | 17 | 18 | 19 | 20 | 21 | 22 | 23 | 24 | 25 | 26 | 27 | 28 | 29 | 30 | 31 | 32 | 33 | 34 | 35 | 36 | 37 | 38 | 39 | 40 | 41 | 42 | 43 | 44 | 45 | 46 |
|---|---|---|---|---|---|---|---|---|---|---|---|---|---|---|---|---|---|---|---|---|---|---|---|---|---|---|---|---|---|---|---|---|---|---|---|---|---|---|---|---|---|---|---|---|---|---|
| Ground | A | H | H | A | H | A | A | H | A | H | H | A | A | H | H | A | H | A | A | H | A | H | A | H | H | H | A | A | A | A | H | A | H | A | H | H | A | H | H | A | A | H | A | H | A | H |
| Result | W | W | L | W | W | D | D | W | D | L | L | W | W | D | L | W | D | D | D | W | D | L | D | L | D | W | L | W | L | L | D | D | W | D | W | D | D | L | W | D | L | L | L | W | W | D |
| Position | 5 | 3 | 6 | 3 | 1 | 2 | 3 | 2 | 2 | 4 | 7 | 5 | 5 | 5 | 6 | 5 | 5 | 7 | 8 | 6 | 7 | 8 | 10 | 13 | 14 | 12 | 12 | 9 | 10 | 10 | 11 | 9 | 10 | 10 | 10 | 10 | 10 | 11 | 11 | 11 | 11 | 11 | 11 | 12 | 11 | 12 |

Updated to match(es) played on 7 April 2013. Source:
A = Away; H = Home; W = Win; D = Draw; L = Loss

== Squad ==
=== Detailed overview ===
| No. | Name | Nat. | Place of birth | Date of birth | Club apps. | Club goals | Int. caps | Int. goals | Previous club | Date joined | Fee |
|---|---|---|---|---|---|---|---|---|---|---|---|
| 1 | Bartosz Białkowski | (Poland) | Braniewo | 6 July 1987 | – | – | – | – | Southampton | 15 June 2012 | Free |
| 2 | Julian Kelly | (England) | Yeovil | 8 October 1983 | 38 | 3 | – | – | Reading | 2 June 2011 | Free |
| 3 | Alan Sheehan | (Republic of Ireland) | Athlone | 14 September 1986 | 45 | 4 | – | – | Swindon Town | 3 June 2011 | Free |
| 4 | Neal Bishop | (England) | Stockton-on-Tees | 7 August 1981 | 149 | 5 | – | – | Barnet | 1 July 2009 | Undisclosed |
| 5 | Manny Smith | (England) | Birmingham | 8 November 1988 | – | – | – | – | Walsall | 9 July 2012 | Free |
| 6 | Dean Leacock | (England) | London | 10 June 1984 | – | – | – | – | Leyton Orient | 26 June 2012 | Free |
| 8 | Gary Liddle | (England) | Middlesbrough | 15 June 1986 | – | – | – | – | Hartlepool United | 21 June 2012 | Free |
| 9 | Enoch Showunmi | (Nigeria) | London | 21 April 1980 | – | – | 2 | 0 | Tranmere Rovers | 13 June 2012 | Free |
| 10 | Alan Judge | (Republic of Ireland) | Dublin | 11 November 1988 | 71 | 10 | – | – | Blackburn Rovers | 14 January 2011 | Undisclosed |
| 11 | Jeff Hughes | (Northern Ireland) | Larne | 29 May 1985 | 51 | 19 | – | – | Bristol Rovers | 28 June 2011 | Free |
| 12 | Liam Mitchell | (England) | Nottingham | 18 September 1992 | – | – | – | – | N/A | 1 July 2011 | Trainee |
| 13 | François Zoko | (Ivory Coast) | Daloa | 13 September 1983 | – | – | – | – | Carlisle United | 3 August 2012 | Free |
| 14 | Gavin Mahon | (England) | Birmingham | 2 January 1977 | 35 | 0 | – | – | Queens Park Rangers | 25 August 2011 | Free |
| 15 | Yoann Arquin | (France) | Le Havre | 15 April 1988 | – | – | – | – | Hereford United | 11 July 2012 | Free |
| 16 | Joss Labadie | (England) | London | 30 August 1990 | – | – | – | – | Tranmere Rovers | 9 July 2012 | Free |
| 17 | Tyrell Waite | (England) | Derbyshire | 1 July 1994 | – | – | – | – | Ilkeston | 21 March 2012 | Undisclosed |
| 18 | Hamza Bencherif | (Algeria) | Paris (France) | 9 February 1988 | 26 | 2 | – | – | Macclesfield Town | 23 June 2011 | Free |
| 19 | John Cofie | (England) | Aboso (Ghana) | 21 January 1993 | – | – | – | – | Manchester United | 8 February 2013 | Loan |
| 20 | Jamal Campbell-Ryce | (Jamaica) | London | 6 April 1983 | – | – | 18 | 0 | Bristol City | 3 July 2012 | Free |
| 21 | Curtis Thompson | (England) | Nottingham | 2 September 1993 | – | – | – | – | N/A | 1 July 2012 | Trainee |
| 22 | Krystian Pearce | (England) | Birmingham | 5 January 1990 | 67 | 5 | – | – | Birmingham City | 26 July 2010 | Free |
| 23 | Fabian Speiss | (Germany) | | 30 November 1993 | 1 | 0 | – | – | N/A | 1 July 2012 | Trainee |
| 24 | Jake Wholey | (England) | Nottingham | 1 December 1993 | – | – | – | – | N/A | 1 July 2012 | Trainee |
| 25 | Greg Tempest | (England) | | 28 December 1993 | – | – | – | – | N/A | 1 July 2012 | Trainee |
| 26 | Haydn Hollis | (England) | Selston | 14 October 1992 | 1 | 0 | – | – | N/A | 1 July 2011 | Trainee |
| 28 | Andre Boucaud | (Trinidad and Tobago) | Enfield | 10 October 1984 | – | – | 6 | 0 | Luton Town | 10 January 2013 | £25,000 |
| 31 | Romello Nangle | (England) | Nottingham | 1995 | – | – | – | – | N/A | 1 July 2012 | Trainee |
| 32 | Kyle Dixon | (England) | Nottingham | 1994 | – | – | – | – | N/A | 1 July 2012 | } |

=== Statistics ===
As of 2 May 2013

| No. | Pos | Nat | Player | Total | | League One | | FA Cup | | League Cup | | League Trophy | |
| No. | Pos | Nat | Player | Apps | Goals | Apps | Goals | Apps | Goals | Apps | Goals | Apps | Goals |
|---|---|---|---|---|---|---|---|---|---|---|---|---|---|
| 1 | GK | (Poland) POL | Bartosz Białkowski | 45 | 0 | 40 | 0 | 2 | 0 | 1 | 0 | 2 | 0 |
| 2 | DF | (England) ENG | Julian Kelly | 24 | 1 | 20+2 | 1 | 2 | 0 | 0 | 0 | 0 | 0 |
| 3 | DF | (Republic of Ireland) IRL | Alan Sheehan | 38 | 2 | 34+1 | 2 | 0 | 0 | 1 | 0 | 2 | 0 |
| 4 | MF | (England) ENG | Neal Bishop | 45 | 7 | 41+1 | 7 | 2 | 0 | 1 | 0 | 0 | 0 |
| 5 | DF | (England) ENG | Manny Smith | 6 | 0 | 4+1 | 0 | 0 | 0 | 1 | 0 | 0 | 0 |
| 6 | DF | (England) ENG | Dean Leacock | 44 | 1 | 42 | 1 | 1 | 0 | 0 | 0 | 1 | 0 |
| 8 | MF | (England) ENG | Gary Liddle | 51 | 0 | 46 | 0 | 3 | 0 | 0 | 0 | 2 | 0 |
| 9 | FW | (Nigeria) NGA | Enoch Showunmi | 26 | 2 | 10+12 | 1 | 0+2 | 0 | 0 | 0 | 2 | 1 |
| 10 | MF | (Republic of Ireland) IRL | Alan Judge | 44 | 8 | 39+1 | 8 | 3 | 0 | 1 | 0 | 0 | 0 |
| 11 | MF | (Northern Ireland) NIR | Jeff Hughes | 47 | 7 | 38+5 | 7 | 2 | 0 | 0+1 | 0 | 1 | 0 |
| 12 | GK | (England) ENG | Liam Mitchell | 1 | 0 | 0 | 0 | 1 | 0 | 0 | 0 | 0 | 0 |
| 13 | FW | (Ivory Coast) CIV | François Zoko | 43 | 8 | 24+13 | 7 | 2+1 | 1 | 0+1 | 0 | 2 | 0 |
| 15 | FW | (France) FRA | Yoann Arquin | 47 | 9 | 27+14 | 7 | 3 | 2 | 1 | 0 | 2 | 0 |
| 16 | MF | (England) ENG | Joss Labadie | 28 | 2 | 8+15 | 2 | 0+3 | 0 | 1 | 0 | 1 | 0 |
| 17 | FW | (England) ENG | Tyrell Waite | 8 | 1 | 3+5 | 1 | 0 | 0 | 0 | 0 | 0 | 0 |
| 18 | MF | (Algeria) ALG | Hamza Bencherif | 14 | 0 | 1+9 | 0 | 1 | 0 | 0+1 | 0 | 2 | 0 |
| 20 | MF | (Jamaica) JAM | Jamal Campbell-Ryce | 38 | 8 | 33+2 | 8 | 2 | 0 | 0 | 0 | 0+1 | 0 |
| 21 | MF | (England) ENG | Curtis Thompson | 2 | 0 | 1+1 | 0 | 0 | 0 | 0 | 0 | 0 | 0 |
| 22 | DF | (England) ENG | Krystian Pearce | 2 | 1 | 2 | 1 | 0 | 0 | 0 | 0 | 0 | 0 |
| 23 | GK | (Germany) GER | Fabian Speiss | 7 | 0 | 6+1 | 0 | 0 | 0 | 0 | 0 | 0 | 0 |
| 24 | DF | (England) ENG | Jake Wholey | 2 | 0 | 0+1 | 0 | 0 | 0 | 0 | 0 | 0+1 | 0 |
| 25 | MF | (England) ENG | Greg Tempest | 3 | 0 | 1+2 | 0 | 0 | 0 | 0 | 0 | 0 | 0 |
| 26 | DF | (England) ENG | Hayden Hollis | 5 | 0 | 4+1 | 0 | 0 | 0 | 0 | 0 | 0 | 0 |
| 28 | MF | (Trinidad and Tobago) TRI | Andre Boucaud | 43 | 1 | 38+1 | 1 | 2 | 0 | 0 | 0 | 2 | 0 |
| 31 | MF | (England) ENG | Romello Nangle | 7 | 1 | 0+6 | 1 | 0 | 0 | 0 | 0 | 0+1 | 0 |
| 32 | MF | (England) ENG | Kyle Dixon | 1 | 0 | 0 | 0 | 0 | 0 | 0 | 0 | 0+1 | 0 |
| 35 | GK | (England) ENG | Kevin Pilkington | 1 | 0 | 0+1 | 0 | 0 | 0 | 0 | 0 | 0 | 0 |
| 39 | DF | (Jamaica) JAM | Damion Stewart | 7 | 0 | 4+1 | 0 | 2 | 0 | 0 | 0 | 0 | 0 |
Players currently out on loan:
| 14 | MF | (England) ENG | Gavin Mahon (at Stevenage) | 14 | 0 | 3+8 | 0 | 1 | 0 | 1 | 0 | 1 | 0 |
Players who have left the club:
| 19 | FW | (England) ENG | John Cofie (on loan from Manchester United) | 7 | 1 | 6+1 | 1 | 0 | 0 | 0 | 0 | 0 | 0 |
| 19 | FW | (England) ENG | Lee Hughes | 20 | 6 | 7+11 | 6 | 0 | 0 | 1 | 0 | 0+1 | 0 |
| 27 | DF | (England) ENG | Carl Regan | 13 | 1 | 9+2 | 0 | 0 | 0 | 1 | 0 | 1 | 1 |
| 29 | FW | (England) ENG | Jacob Blyth (on loan from Leicester City) | 4 | 0 | 2+2 | 0 | 0 | 0 | 0 | 0 | 0 | 0 |
| 29 | DF | (England) ENG | Jordan Stewart | 6 | 1 | 5 | 0 | 0 | 0 | 0 | 0 | 1 | 1 |
| 30 | DF | (Cyprus) CYP | Tom Williams | 4 | 0 | 1 | 0 | 0+1 | 0 | 1 | 0 | 1 | 0 |
| 34 | DF | (England) ENG | Ashley Eastham (on loan from Blackpool) | 4 | 0 | 3+1 | 0 | 0 | 0 | 0 | 0 | 0 | 0 |
| 34 | FW | (Scotland) SCO | Chris Iwelumo (on loan from Watford) | 5 | 0 | 5 | 0 | 0 | 0 | 0 | 0 | 0 | 0 |

==== Goal scorers ====
| Rank | No | Pos. | Name | League One | FA Cup | League Cup | League Trophy | Total | |
|---|---|---|---|---|---|---|---|---|---|
| 1 | 15 | FW | Yoann Arquin | 7 | 2 | 0 | 0 | 9 | |
| 2 | 20 | MF | Jamal Campbell-Ryce | 8 | 0 | 0 | 0 | 8 | |
| 2 | 10 | MF | Alan Judge | 8 | 0 | 0 | 0 | 8 | |
| 2 | 13 | FW | François Zoko | 7 | 1 | 0 | 0 | 8 | |
| 5 | 4 | MF | Neal Bishop | 7 | 0 | 0 | 0 | 7 | |
| 5 | 11 | MF | Jeff Hughes | 7 | 0 | 0 | 0 | 7 | |
| 7 | ~~19~~ | FW | Lee Hughes | 6 | 0 | 0 | 0 | 6 | |
| 8 | 9 | FW | Enoch Showunmi | 1 | 0 | 0 | 1 | 2 | |
| 8 | 16 | MF | Joss Labadie | 2 | 0 | 0 | 0 | 2 | |
| 10 | 28 | MF | Andre Boucaud | 1 | 0 | 0 | 0 | 1 | |
| 10 | 19 | FW | John Cofie | 1 | 0 | 0 | 0 | 1 | |
| 10 | 2 | DF | Julian Kelly | 1 | 0 | 0 | 0 | 1 | |
| 10 | 6 | DF | Dean Leacock | 1 | 0 | 0 | 0 | 1 | |
| 10 | 31 | FW | Romello Nangle | 1 | 0 | 0 | 0 | 1 | |
| 10 | 22 | DF | Krystian Pearce | 1 | 0 | 0 | 0 | 1 | |
| 10 | 27 | DF | Carl Regan | 0 | 0 | 0 | 1 | 1 | |
| 10 | 29 | DF | Jordan Stewart | 0 | 0 | 0 | 1 | 1 | |
| 10 | 17 | FW | Tyrell Waite | 1 | 0 | 0 | 0 | 1 | |
| 10 | Own Goal | | | 1 | 0 | 0 | 0 | 1 | |
| 10 | Total | | | | 58 | 3 | 0 | 3 | 64 |

==== Disciplinary record ====
| No. | Pos. | Name | League One | | FA Cup | | League Cup | | League Trophy | | Total | |
| No. | Pos. | Name | Booked | Sent off (straight red) | Booked | Sent off (straight red) | Booked | Sent off (straight red) | Booked | Sent off (straight red) | Booked | Sent off (straight red) |
|---|---|---|---|---|---|---|---|---|---|---|---|---|
| 1 | GK | Bartosz Białkowski | 1 | 0 | 0 | 0 | 0 | 0 | 0 | 0 | 1 | 0 |
| 2 | DF | Julian Kelly | 3 | 0 | 0 | 0 | 0 | 0 | 0 | 0 | 3 | 0 |
| 3 | DF | Alan Sheehan | 7 | 1 | 0 | 0 | 1 | 0 | 0 | 0 | 8 | 1 |
| 4 | MF | Neal Bishop | 9 | 1 | 0 | 0 | 0 | 0 | 0 | 0 | 9 | 1 |
| 6 | DF | Dean Leacock | 9 | 0 | 0 | 0 | 0 | 0 | 0 | 0 | 9 | 0 |
| 8 | MF | Gary Liddle | 6 | 0 | 0 | 0 | 0 | 0 | 0 | 0 | 6 | 0 |
| 9 | FW | Enoch Showunmi | 1 | 0 | 0 | 0 | 0 | 0 | 0 | 0 | 1 | 0 |
| 10 | MF | Alan Judge | 10 | 0 | 1 | 0 | 0 | 0 | 0 | 0 | 11 | 0 |
| 11 | MF | Jeff Hughes | 5 | 0 | 0 | 0 | 1 | 0 | 0 | 0 | 6 | 0 |
| 13 | FW | François Zoko | 0 | 1 | 1 | 0 | 0 | 0 | 0 | 0 | 1 | 1 |
| 14 | MF | Gavin Mahon | 6 | 0 | 0 | 0 | 0 | 0 | 2 | 0 | 8 | 0 |
| 15 | FW | Yoann Arquin | 9 | 3 | 0 | 0 | 0 | 0 | 0 | 0 | 5 | 1 |
| 16 | MF | Joss Labadie | 5 | 0 | 0 | 0 | 0 | 0 | 0 | 0 | 5 | 0 |
| 18 | MF | Hamza Bencherif | 1 | 0 | 0 | 0 | 0 | 0 | 0 | 0 | 1 | 0 |
| 19 | FW | Lee Hughes | 2 | 0 | 0 | 0 | 0 | 0 | 1 | 0 | 3 | 0 |
| 20 | MF | Jamal Campbell-Ryce | 5 | 1 | 1 | 0 | 0 | 0 | 0 | 0 | 6 | 1 |
| 26 | DF | Hayden Hollis | 1 | 0 | 0 | 0 | 0 | 0 | 0 | 0 | 1 | 0 |
| 27 | DF | Carl Regan | 3 | 0 | 0 | 0 | 1 | 0 | 0 | 0 | 4 | 0 |
| 28 | MF | Andre Boucaud | 6 | 2 | 1 | 0 | 0 | 0 | 0 | 0 | 7 | 2 |
| 29 | DF | Jordan Stewart | 1 | 0 | 0 | 0 | 0 | 0 | 0 | 0 | 1 | 0 |
| 39 | DF | Damion Stewart | 1 | 0 | 0 | 1 | 0 | 0 | 0 | 0 | 1 | 1 |
| Total | | | 82 | 7 | 4 | 1 | 3 | 0 | 2 | 0 | 91 | 8 |

== Transfers ==
=== In ===
| No. | Pos. | Nat. | Name | Age | EU | Moving from | Type | Transfer window | Ends | Transfer fee | Source |
|---|---|---|---|---|---|---|---|---|---|---|---|
| 23 | GK | (Germany) | Speiss | — | EU | Youth system | promoted | Summer | 2013 | Youth system | |
| 25 | MF | (England) | Tempest | — | EU | Youth system | promoted | Summer | 2013 | Youth system | |
| 24 | MF | (England) | Wholey | — | EU | Youth system | Promoted | Summer | 2013 | Youth system | |
| 9 | FW | (Nigeria) (England) | Showumni | 30 | EU | Tranmere Rovers | Free | Summer | 2014 | Free | |
| 1 | GK | (Poland) | Białkowski | 24 | EU | Southampton | Free | Summer | 2015 | Free | |
| 8 | MF | (England) | Liddle | 25 | EU | Hartlepool United | Free | Summer | 2014 | Free | |
| 6 | DF | (England) | Leacock | 28 | EU | Leyton Orient | Free | Summer | 2014 | Free | |
| 20 | MF | (Jamaica) (England) | Campbell-Ryce | 29 | EU | Bristol City | Free | Summer | 2014 | Free | |
| 16 | MF | (England) | Labadie | 21 | EU | Tranmere Rovers | Free | Summer | 2013 | Free | |
| 5 | DF | (England) | Smith | 23 | EU | Walsall | Free | Summer | 2014 | Free | |
| 15 | FW | (France) | Arquin | 24 | EU | Hereford United | Free | Summer | 2013 | Free | |
| 13 | FW | (Ivory Coast) | Zoko | 28 | EU | Carlisle United | Free | Summer | 2014 | Free | |
| 27 | DF | (England) | Regan | 32 | EU | Shrewsbury Town | Free | Summer | 2013 | Free | |
| 30 | DF | (Cyprus) (England) | Williams | 32 | EU | Free agent | Free | Summer | 2013 | Free | |
| 29 | DF | (England) | J. Stewart | 30 | EU | Free agent | Free | | 2013 | Free | |
| 39 | DF | (Jamaica) | D. Stewart | 32 | EU | Free agent | Free | | 2013 | Free | |
| 28 | MF | (Trinidad and Tobago) (England) | Boucaud | 28 | EU | Luton Town | Transfer | Winter | 2014 | £25,000 | |

=== Loans in ===
| No. | Pos. | Name | Country | Age | Loan club | Started | Ended | Start source | End source |
|---|---|---|---|---|---|---|---|---|---|
| 28 | MF | Boucaud | (Trinidad and Tobago) (England) | 28 | Luton Town | 1 August | 3 January | | |
| 34 | DF | Eastham | (England) | 21 | Blackpool | 6 October | November | | |
| 34 | FW | Iwelumo | (Scotland) | 34 | Watford | 22 November | 3 January | | |
| 19 | FW | Cofie | (England) | 20 | Manchester United | 8 February | 11 March | | |
| 29 | FW | Blyth | (England) | 20 | Leicester City | 13 February | 15 March | | |

Sources: For loan start source see "Start source". For loan end source see "End source".
EU = if holds or not a European Union passport; Country: when 2 flags, 1st flag = country that plays for internationally, 2nd flag = country of birth; No. = number on jersey; P = Position (for position name, pause mouse pointer on abbreviation); Name = Name on jersey (for more extensive name, pause mouse pointer on name); In/Out = In: The player came in on loan, Out: The player went out on loan; Loan club = the club that the player moved on loan to or the club that the player came from on loan; Started = the date when the player's loan started; Ended = the date when the player's loan ended.

=== Out ===
| No. | Pos. | Name | Country | Age | Type | Moving to | Transfer window | Transfer fee | Apps | Goals | Source |
|---|---|---|---|---|---|---|---|---|---|---|---|
| 19 | MF | Allen | (England) | 20 | Contract ended | Gillingham | Summer | N/A | 12 | 0 | |
| 1 | GK | Burch | (England) | 28 | Contract ended | | Summer | N/A | 19 | 0 | |
| 22 | FW | Burgess | (Republic of Ireland) (England) | 30 | Contract ended | Tranmere Rovers | Summer | N/A | 51 | 5 | |
| 24 | DF | Chilvers | (England) | 30 | Contract ended | | Summer | N/A | 46 | 0 | |
| 7 | MF | Demontagnac | (England) | 23 | Contract ended | Northampton Town | Summer | N/A | 22 | 0 | |
| 23 | DF | Harley | (England) | 32 | Contract ended | Portsmouth | Summer | N/A | 63 | 0 | |
| 8 | FW | Hawley | (England) | 30 | Contract ended | Scunthorpe United | Summer | N/A | 132 | 11 | |
| 16 | DF | Hunt | (England) | 27 | Contract ended | | Summer | N/A | 136 | 6 | |
| 17 | GK | Nelson | (England) | 30 | Contract ended | Gillingham | Summer | N/A | 91 | 0 | |
| 27 | MF | Nicholas | (England) | 19 | Contract ended | | Summer | N/A | 0 | 0 | |
| 18 | DF | Sodje | (Nigeria) (England) | 32 | Contract ended | | Summer | N/A | 31 | 4 | |
| 25 | MF | Spicer | (England) | 28 | Contract ended | Southend United | Summer | N/A | 29 | 3 | |
| 12 | DF | Stirling | (England) | 29 | Contract ended | | Summer | N/A | 10 | 0 | |
| 4 | DF | Edwards | (England) | 32 | Contract ended | Carlisle United | Summer | Free | 305 | 21 | |
| 27 | DF | Regan | (England) | 32 | Contract Ended | Free agent | Winter | N/A | 13 | 1 | |
| {{{n}}} | DF | Williams | (Cyprus) (England) | 32 | Contract Ended | Free agent | Winter | N/A | 4 | 0 | |
| {{{n}}} | FW | L Hughes | (England) | 36 | Contract Terminated | Port Vale | | Free | 145 | 66 | |

EU = if holds or not a European Union passport; Country: when 2 flags, 1st flag = country that plays for internationally, 2nd flag = country of birth; N = number on jersey; P = Position (for position name, pause mouse pointer on abbreviation); Name = Name on jersey (for more extensive name, pause mouse pointer on name); Age = age on the day of the signing; Moving from = only indicate the club the player was playing before start playing for this club in this season, for the type of the moving see Status column; Moving to = only indicates the club the player is going to play next, for the type of the moving see Status column; Ends = when the player's current contract ends; n/a = Not applicable; Apps = Total number of competitive appearances (including substitute appearances) at the club prior to departure; Goals = Total number of competitive goals scored at the club prior to departure.

=== Loans out ===
| No. | Pos. | Name | Country | Age | Loan club | Started | Ended | Start source | End source |
|---|---|---|---|---|---|---|---|---|---|
| 22 | DF | Pearce | (England) | 22 | Barnet | 14 September | 17 December | | |
| 17 | FW | Waite | (England) | 18 | Nuneaton Town | 19 October | 19 December | | |
| 25 | MF | Tempest | (England) | ? | Ilkeston | 9 November | 9 December | | |
| 21 | MF | Thompson | (England) | 32 | Ilkeston | 16 November | 16 December | | |
| 14 | MF | Mahon | (England) | 49 | Stevenage | 22 February | | | |
| 16 | MF | Labadie | (England) | 22 | Torquay United | 6 March | 3 April | | |
| 12 | GK | Mitchell | (England) | 33 | Tamworth | 20 March | 20 April | | |

Sources: For loan start source see "Start source". For loan end source see "End source".
EU = if holds or not a European Union passport; Country: when 2 flags, 1st flag = country that plays for internationally, 2nd flag = country of birth; No. = number on jersey; P = Position (for position name, pause mouse pointer on abbreviation); Name = Name on jersey (for more extensive name, pause mouse pointer on name); In/Out = In: The player came in on loan, Out: The player went out on loan; Loan club = the club that the player moved on loan to or the club that the player came from on loan; Started = the date when the player's loan started; Ended = the date when the player's loan ended.

=== Contracts ===
| No. | Pos. | Nat. | Name | Age | Status | Contract length | Expiry date | Source |
|---|---|---|---|---|---|---|---|---|
| 4 | DF | (England) | Edwards | 32 | Rejected | 1 year | June 2013 | |
| 26 | MF | (England) | Hollis | 19 | Signed | 1 year | June 2013 | |
| 14 | MF | (England) | Mahon | 35 | Signed | 1 year | June 2013 | |
| 12 | GK | (England) | Mitchell | 19 | Signed | 1 year | June 2013 | |
| 11 | MF | (Northern Ireland) | J Hughes | 26 | Offered | Undisclosed | Undisclosed | |
| 10 | MF | (Republic of Ireland) | Judge | 23 | Rejected | Undisclosed | Undisclosed | |
| 39 | DF | (England) | D Stewart | 46 | Offered | Undisclosed | Undisclosed | |
| 29 | DF | (England) | J Stewart | 44 | Offered | Undisclosed | Undisclosed | |
| 4 | MF | (England) | Bishop | 31 | Signed | 1 year | June 2014 | |

== Fixtures and Results ==
=== League One ===
| 18 August 2012 1 | Crewe Alexandra | 1–2 | Notts County | Alexandra Stadium, Crewe |
| 15:00 | Pogba 73' | Report | 40' Zoko; 58' (red card) 60' Aquin | Attendance: 5,718 |

| 21 August 2012 2 | Notts County | 2–0 | Hartlepool United | Meadow Lane, Nottingham |
| 19:45 | Zoko 17'; Bishop 86' | Report | | Attendance: 4,913 |

| 25 August 2012 3 | Notts County | 0–1 | Walsall | Meadow Lane, Nottingham |
| 15:00 | | Report | 80' Butler | Attendance: 5,851 |

| 1 September 2012 4 | Bury | 0–2 | Notts County | Gigg Lane, Bury |
| 15:00 | | Report | 2' L Hughes; 90' Judge | Attendance: 2,725 |

| 8 September 2012 5 | Notts County | 3–2 | Shrewsbury Town | Meadow Lane, Nottingham |
| 15:00 | Zoko 57'; J Hughes 64'; L Hughes 87' | Report | 61' (pen.) Richards; 62' Grandison | Attendance: 6,774 |

| 15 September 2012 6 | Oldham Athletic | 2–2 | Notts County | Boundary Park, Oldham |
| 15:00 | Derbyshire 49'; Baxter 85' | Report | 46' Labadie; 82' Campbell-Ryce | Attendance: 4,039 |

| 18 September 2012 7 | Milton Keynes Dons | 1–1 | Notts County | Stadium:mk, Milton Keynes |
| 19:45 | O'Shea 68' | Report | 27' Bishop | Attendance: 7,121 |

| 22 September 2012 8 | Notts County | 3–0 | Portsmouth | Meadow Lane, Nottingham |
| 15:00 | Arquin 5', 57'; Judge 47' | Report | | Attendance: 6,834 |

| 29 September 2012 9 | Sheffield United | 1–1 | Notts County | Brammall Lane, Sheffield |
| 15:00 | Kitson 51' | Report | 76' L Hughes | Attendance: 18,814 |

| 2 October 2012 10 | Notts County | 1–2 | Stevenage | Meadow Lane, Nottingham |
| 19:45 | Campbell-Ryce 71' (pen.); Sheehan (red card) 83' | Report | 83' (pen.) Akins; 90+2' Shroot | Attendance: 4,927 |

| 6 October 2012 11 | Notts County | 0–1 | Tranmere Rovers | Meadow Lane, Nottingham |
| 15:00 | | Report | 22' Thompson | Attendance: 7,260 |

| 13 October 2012 12 | Carlisle United | 0–4 | Notts County | Prenton Park, Carlisle |
| 15:00 | | Report | 11' J Hughes; 27' Bishop; 54' Zoko; 57' (pen.) Campbell-Ryce | Attendance: 4,731 |

| 20 October 2012 13 | Coventry City | 1–2 | Notts County | Ricoh Arena, Coventry |
| 15:00 | Wood 87' | Report | 39' Boucaud; 84' Arquin | Attendance: 11,882 |

| 23 October 2012 14 | Notts County | 3–3 | Bournemouth | Meadow Lane, Nottingham |
| 19:45 | J Hughes 21'; Arquin 32'; Campbell-Ryce 84' (pen.) | Report | 51' McQuoid; 60' Arter; 85' Matt Tubbs | Attendance: 4,584 |

| 27 October 2012 15 | Notts County | 0–2 | Doncaster Rovers | Meadow Lane, Nottingham |
| 15:00 | | Report | 61' Keegan; 63' Brown | Attendance: 6,750 |

| 6 November 2012 16 | Colchester United | 0–2 | Notts County | Colchester Community Stadium |
| 19:45 | | Report | 17' Bishop; 44' Judge | Attendance: 3,051 |

| 10 November 2012 17 | Notts County | 1–1 | Crawley Town | Meadow Lane |
| 15:00 | Bishop 12' | Report | 45' Forte | Attendance: 5,685 |

| 17 November 2012 18 | Scunthorpe United | 2–2 | Notts County | Glanford Park |
| 15:00 | Ribeiro 13'; Mozika 45'; Reid (red card) 69' | Report | 34', 82' Hughes | Attendance: 4,553 |

| 20 November 2012 19 | Preston North End | 0–0 | Notts County | Deepdale |
| 19:45 | | Report | (red card) 90+4' Campbell-Ryce | Attendance: 8,013 |

| 24 November 2012 20 | Notts County | 1–0 | Swindon Town | Meadow Lane |
| 15:00 | Judge 28' | Report | | Attendance: 6,383 |

| 8 December 2012 21 | Yeovil Town | 0–0 | Notts County | Huish Park |
| 15:00 | | Report | | Attendance: 3,355 |

| 15 December 2012 22 | Notts County | 1–2 | Brentford | Meadow Lane |
| 15:00 | Craig 20' (o.g.) | Report | 36' Forshaw; 88' Donaldson | Attendance: 5,307 |

| 22 December 2012 | Notts County | P–P | Leyton Orient | Meadow Lane |
| 15:00 | | Report |

| 26 December 2012 23 | Shrewsbury Town | 2–2 | Notts County | New Meadow |
| 15:00 | Rodgers 19'; Bialkowski 81' (o.g.) | Report | 24' L Hughes; 45' Campbell-Ryce | Attendance: 6,474 |

| 29 December 2012 | Steveange | P–P | Notts County | Broadhall Way |
| 15:00 | | Report |

| 1 January 2013 24 | Notts County | 1–2 | Milton Keynes Dons | Meadow Lane |
| 15:00 | Campbell-Ryce 56' (pen.) | Report | 6' Potter; 13' Powell | Attendance: 5,325 |

| 12 January 2013 | Portsmouth | P–P | Notts County | Fratton Park |
| 15:00 | | Report |

| 19 January 2013 25 | Notts County | 1–1 | Sheffield United | Meadow Lane |
| 15:00 | Zoko (red card) 25'; Judge 80' | Report | 2' Maguire | Attendance: 7,061 |

| 22 January 2013 26 | Notts County | 1–0 | Hartlepool United | Meadow Lane |
| 19:45 | Showunmi 35' | Report | | Attendance: 3,409 |

| 26 January 2013 27 | Leyton Orient | 2–1 | Notts County | Brisbane Road |
| 15:00 | Mooney 65'; Baudry 68' | Report | 78' Hughes | Attendance: 3,578 |

| 29 January 2013 28 | Portsmouth | 0–2 | Notts County | Fratton Park |
| 19:45 | | Report | 81' Hughes; 88' Zoko; (red card) 90' Bishop | Attendance: 10,276 |

| 2 February 2013 29 | Hartlepool United | 2–1 | Notts County | Victoria Park |
| 15:00 | Poole 5'; Hartley 70' | Report | | Attendance: 3,662 |

| 5 February 2013 30 | Stevenage | 2–0 | Notts County | Broadhall Way |
| 19:45 | Hoskins 1'; Haber 89' | Report | | Attendance: 2,550 |

| 9 February 2013 31 | Notts County | 1–1 | Crewe Alexandra | Meadow Lane |
| 15:00 | Cofie 57' | Report | 45' (pen.) Murphy | Attendance: 5,450 |

| 16 February 2013 32 | Walsall | 1–1 | Notts County | Bescot Stadium |
| 15:00 | Grigg 29' (pen.) | Report | 66' Arquin | Attendance: 4,416 |

| 22 February 2013 33 | Notts County | 4–1 | Bury | Meadow Lane |
| 19:45 | Kelly 58'; Zoko 61', 65'; Campbell-Ryce 74' (pen.) | Report | 24' Schumacher | Attendance: 5,795 |

| 26 February 2013 34 | Tranmere Rovers | 1–1 | Notts County | Prenton Park |
| 19:45 | Bell-Baggie 29' | Report | 74' Bishop | Attendance: 4,703 |

| 2 March 2013 35 | Notts County | 1–0 | Carlisle United | Meadow Lane |
| 15:00 | Judge 35' | Report | (red card) 89' Miller | Attendance: 5,553 |

| 6 March 2013 36 | Notts County | 1–1 | Leyton Orient | Meadow Lane |
| 19:45 | Bishop 31' | Report | 66' (pen.) Lisbie | Attendance: 4,004 |

| 9 March 2013 37 | Crawley Town | 0–0 | Notts County | Broadfield Stadium |
| 15:00 | | Report | | Attendance: 3,689 |

| 13 March 2013 38 | Notts County | 0–1 | Preston North End | Meadow Lane |
| 19:45 | | Report | 34' (o.g.) Hollis | Attendance: 3,587 |

| 16 March 2013 39 | Notts County | 1–0 | Scunthorpe United | Meadow Lane |
| 15:00 | Leacock 81' | Report | | Attendance: 4,634 |

| 23 March 2013 40 | Swindon Town | 0–0 | Notts County | County Ground |
| 15:00 | | Report | | Attendance: 8,415 |

| 29 March 2013 41 | Brentford | 2–1 | Notts County | Griffin Park |
| 15:00 | Diagouraga 21'; Wright-Phillips 70' | Report | 74' Judge | Attendance: 7,412 |

| 1 April 2013 42 | Notts County | 1–2 | Yeovil Town | Meadow Lane |
| 15:00 | Judge 49' (pen.) | Report | 45' Madden; 52' Dolan | Attendance: 5,004 |

| 6 April 2013 43 | Bournemouth | 3–1 | Notts County | Dean Court |
| 15:00 | Ritchie 17', 85'; Pitman 26' | Report | 2' Hughes; (yellow card) 29' (yellow-red card) 45' Boucaud | Attendance: 7,551 |

| 13 April 2013 44 | Notts County | 3–1 | Colchester United | Meadow Lane |
| 15:00 | Hughes 18'; Arquin 77'; Nangle 90' | Report | 37' Ibehre | Attendance: 4,306 |

| 20 April 2013 45 | Doncaster Rovers | 0–1 | Notts County | Keepmoat Stadium |
| 15:00 | | Report | 14' Labadie | Attendance: 12,624 |

| 27 April 2013 46 | Notts County | 2–2 | Coventry City | Meadow Lane |
| 15:00 | Waite 34'; Pearce 54' | Report | 50' Fleck; 90' Moussi | Attendance: 7,608 |

=== FA Cup ===
| 3 November 2012 First Round | Portsmouth | 0–2 | Notts County | Fratton Park, Portsmouth |
| 15:00 | (yellow card) 72' (yellow-red card) Allan | Report | 45' Zoko; 56' Arquin | Attendance: 7,560 |

| 1 December 2012 Second Round | Rotherham United | 1–1 | Notts County | New York Stadium, Rotherham |
| 15:00 | Pringle 42' | | 32' Arquin | Attendance: 7,903 |

| 18 December 2012 Second Round Replay | Notts County | 0–3 | Rotherham United | Meadow Lane, Nottingham |
| 19:45 | | | 9' Pringle; 22' Bradley; 41' Nardiello | Attendance: 2,990 |

=== League Cup ===
| 11 August 2012 First round | Notts County | 0–1 (a.e.t.) | Bradford City | Meadow Lane, Nottingham |
| 15:00 | | Report | 95' Hanson | Attendance: 3,460 |

=== League Trophy ===
| 4 September 2012 First round | Scunthorpe United | 1–2 | Notts County | Glanford Park, Scunthorpe |
| 19:45 | Duffy 11' | Report | 41' Showunmi; 58' Regan | Attendance: 752 |

| 17 October 2012 Second round | Notts County | 1–4 | Sheffield United | Meadow Lane, Nottingham |
| 19:45 | J Stewart 75' | Report | 24', 52' Miller; 45', 54' Maguire | Attendance: 2,082 |

== Awards ==
- Supporters' Player of the Year: Gary Liddle
- Players' Player of the Year: Gary Liddle
- Manager's Player of the Year: Gary Liddle
- Golden Boot: Yoann Arquin
