= Dennis Allen (footballer) =

English footballer and manager

Personal information
- Date of birth: 2 March 1939
- Place of birth: Romford, England
- Date of death: 9 July 1995 (aged 56)
- Place of death: Reading, England
- Height: 5 ft 10 in (1.78 m)
- Position: Inside forward

Senior career*
Years	Team	Apps	(Gls)
1957–1961	Charlton Athletic	5	(1)
1961–1970	Reading	336	(85)
1970–1971	Bournemouth & Boscombe Athletic	17	(3)
1972–1973	Oostende	29	(1)
1974–1979	Cheltenham Town		
Total		387	(90)

Managerial career
- 1974–1979: Cheltenham Town
- * Club domestic league appearances and goals

Dennis James Allen (2 March 1939 – 9 July 1995) was an English football player and manager.

Born in Romford, Allen represented Charlton Athletic (1956–1961), Reading (1961–1970) and Bournemouth & Boscombe Athletic (1970–1971) as an inside-forward. He scored 89 goals in 358 league appearances. Dennis went on to be player-manager at Cheltenham Town.

His brother Les (b. 1937), son Martin (b. 1965), grandson Charlie Allen (b. 1992), great-nephew Oliver (b. 1986) and nephews Bradley (b. 1971), Clive (b. 1961) and Paul Allen (b. 1962) all played football professionally. Martin went on to manage Cheltenham Town himself.
