= Alan Sheehan =

Irish footballer (born 1986)

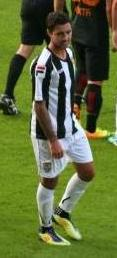
- Sheehan playing for Notts County in 2013

Personal information
- Full name: Alan Michael Anthony Sheehan
- Date of birth: 14 September 1986 (age 40)
- Place of birth: Athlone, Ireland
- Height: 5 ft 11 in (1.80 m)
- Position: Left back

Youth career
- Belvedere

Senior career*
Years	Team	Apps	(Gls)
2003–2008	Leicester City	23	(1)
2006	→ Mansfield Town (loan)	10	(0)
2008	→ Leeds United (loan)	10	(1)
2008–2010	Leeds United	11	(1)
2009	→ Crewe Alexandra (loan)	3	(0)
2009	→ Oldham Athletic (loan)	8	(1)
2009–2010	→ Swindon Town (loan)	23	(1)
2010–2011	Swindon Town	21	(1)
2011–2014	Notts County	114	(9)
2014–2016	Bradford City	25	(1)
2015	→ Peterborough United (loan)	2	(0)
2015–2016	→ Notts County (loan)	14	(2)
2016	→ Luton Town (loan)	20	(1)
2016–2020	Luton Town	97	(5)
2020	Lincoln City	1	(0)
2020–2021	Northampton Town	14	(1)
2021–2022	Oldham Athletic	6	(0)
Total		402	(25)

International career
2005–2007	Republic of Ireland U21	5	(1)

Managerial career
- 2023–2024: Swansea City (caretaker)
- 2025: Swansea City
- * Club domestic league appearances and goals

Alan Michael Anthony Sheehan (born 14 September 1986) is an Irish professional football coach and former player who played as a left back. He was recently head coach of EFL Championship club Swansea City.

Sheehan began his playing career at Belvedere. He joined Leicester City in July 2003 and played for eleven other clubs in the English football leagues over a nearly 20-year playing career. He won two promotions with Luton Town as club captain and was named in the PFA Team of the Year in 2018. Internationally, Sheehan played for the Republic of Ireland national under-21 team.

In 2021, Sheehan became a player-coach at Oldham Athletic. He then joined the coaching staff at Luton, Southampton and Swansea City. Sheehan had two spells as Swansea's caretaker head coach before becoming their permanent head coach in 2025, but was dismissed later that year.

== Club career ==
=== Leicester City ===
Sheehan joined Leicester City in July 2003 after being spotted by a scout whilst playing for Belvedere. He initially played for the club's youth team and joined Mansfield Town on loan to gain first team experience.

Sheehan scored his first competitive goal for Leicester in a 4–1 win over Watford on 25 August 2007, and his second in a 3–2 win over Nottingham Forest on 18 September. Following Leicester's 2–0 victory over Bristol City on 24 November, Sheehan was named in the Championship Team of the Week. He made 20 league starts in the senior team for Leicester.

=== Leeds United ===
On 31 January 2008, Sheehan joined Leeds United on loan for the rest of the season, having rejected a new contract offer from Leicester. He made his Leeds debut in a 2–0 defeat to Tranmere Rovers on 2 February 2008, replacing Ben Parker at left back. Sheehan scored his first goal for Leeds in their 1–0 win over Doncaster Rovers on 1 April 2008.

Sheehan was sent off in Leeds' 1–0 win over Yeovil Town for a two-footed tackle on Zoltán Stieber. The straight red card meant he was suspended for both legs of the play-off semi-final against Carlisle United. After Leeds lost the play-off final against Doncaster Rovers, Sheehan signed permanently for Leeds on 1 July 2008. He scored a long range goal against Crewe Alexandra in a 5–2 win, but was sent off for another two-footed tackle in a match against Swindon Town.

==== Loan spells ====
In March 2009, Sheehan joined Crewe Alexandra on loan for the rest of the season. He made his debut in the 2–2 draw with Milton Keynes Dons. The following season, he joined League One club Oldham Athletic on a one-month loan and made his league debut for Oldham on 4 September in a 3–0 home defeat to Hartlepool United. Sheehan gained two assists in a 2–0 win over Carlisle United and scored his first Oldham goal in a 2–1 win over Milton Keynes Dons on 29 September 2009. On 2 October 2009, his loan was extended until 1 November.

On 26 November 2009, Sheehan joined League One club Swindon Town on loan and made his debut in the FA Cup match against Wrexham. Swindon faced Charlton Athletic in the League One play-offs; Sheehan played in the first leg, which Swindon won 2–1, but he missed the second leg through injury. Sheehan returned to play in the play-off final defeat to Millwall, and was substituted after 67 minutes after aggravating his injury. On 31 August 2010, Sheehan signed for Swindon from Leeds on a one-year deal.

=== Notts County and Bradford City ===
In July 2011, Sheehan left Swindon to join League One club Notts County on a two-year contract. Two years later, in July 2013, he signed a two-year contract extension. Sheehan was made club captain during the 2013–14 campaign and was awarded Player of the Year towards the end of the season.

After making more than 100 appearances for Notts County, Sheehan signed for League One club Bradford City on a free transfer in June 2014. He was signed by manager Phil Parkinson for his ability to play left back and centre back. Sheehan scored a penalty on his league debut, a 3–2 home win over Coventry City.

On 26 March 2015, Sheehan moved on a short-term loan to League One club Peterborough United until the end of the 2014–15 season. At the start of the following season, Sheehan made two league appearances for Bradford City and returned to Notts County on a three-month loan. While at Notts County, Sheehan scored the winning goal in the club's 2–1 win against Portsmouth, which was the sixth league win in seven games for Notts County.

=== Luton Town ===
On 22 January 2016, Sheehan signed for League Two club Luton Town on loan from Bradford until the end of 2015–16. He scored a volley, his only goal during his loan spell for the club, in a 1–1 draw with Yeovil Town on 2 February 2016. Sheehan played in every match, making 20 league appearances for the club during his loan spell.

Four months after joining Luton, Sheehan signed a permanent two-year contract with the club. His contract was extended by a further year at the end of the 2017–18 season after a promotion clause was triggered as a result of Luton's promotion to League One. Sheehan then signed a new two-year contract with Luton at the end of May 2018. He was named in the League Two PFA Team of the Year for 2017–18 and was awarded Luton's Player of the Year.

The following season, Luton were promoted to the Championship with Sheehan as club captain. He reached an agreement with Luton over the final six months of his contract and was released as a free agent on 31 January 2020.

=== Later career and retirement ===
Sheehan signed for League One club Lincoln City on 2 March 2020 on a contract until the end of the 2019–20 season. He then joined League One club Northampton Town on 27 October 2020 on an appearance-based contract. Sheehan re-signed for Oldham Athletic as a player-coach on 23 July 2021 on a one-year contract, before retiring from playing in January 2022.

== International career ==
Sheehan won 5 caps for Republic of Ireland U21.

== Coaching career ==
=== Early career ===
After several months as a player-coach at Oldham Athletic, Sheehan returned to Luton Town as a first-team coach in 2022. Following the departure of manager Nathan Jones to Southampton later that year, Sheehan followed him as a first-team coach alongside Chris Cohen. Jones was dismissed by Southampton three months later; Sheehan and Cohen left with him.

=== Swansea City ===
Sheehan was appointed as one of two assistant head coaches at Championship club Swansea City in June 2023. Following the sacking of Michael Duff in December 2023, he was appointed caretaker head coach. When Luke Williams replaced Duff, Sheehan returned to his assistant role and later earned his UEFA Pro Licence in June 2024.

After Williams was sacked in February 2025, Sheehan was again appointed caretaker head coach. The following month, he was given the caretaker role until the end of the season after a run of seven points from five matches. Following a 2–2 draw against Leeds United, Sheehan led Swansea to five consecutive wins, which was the club's longest league winning run since 2007. On 30 April 2025, he was appointed head coach on a permanent three-year deal, but was dismissed in November 2025 after a poor start to the season.

== Career statistics ==
Appearances and goals by club, season and competition
Club	Season	League			FA Cup		League Cup		Other		Total	
Club	Season	Division	Apps	Goals	Apps	Goals	Apps	Goals	Apps	Goals	Apps	Goals
Leicester City	2004–05	Championship	1	0	0	0	0	0	—		1	0
Leicester City	2005–06	Championship	2	0	0	0	2	0	—		4	0
Leicester City	2006–07	Championship	0	0	0	0	0	0	—		0	0
Leicester City	2007–08	Championship	20	1	1	0	3	1	—		24	2
Leicester City	Total		23	1	1	0	5	1	—		29	2
Mansfield Town (loan)	2006–07	League Two	10	0	—		0	0	1 (Note: Appearance(s) in Football League Trophy)	0	11	0
Leeds United (loan)	2007–08	League One	10	1	—		—		0	0	10	1
Leeds United	2008–09	League One	11	1	1	0	1	0	1	0	14	1
Leeds United	2009–10	League One	0	0	0	0	0	0	—		0	0
Leeds United	Total		21	2	1	0	1	0	1	0	24	2
Crewe Alexandra (loan)	2008–09	League One	3	0	—		—		—		3	0
Oldham Athletic (loan)	2009–10	League One	8	1	—		—		1	0	9	1
Swindon Town (loan)	2009–10	League One	23	1	2	0	—		1 (Note: Appearance in League One play-offs)	0	26	1
Swindon Town	2010–11	League One	21	1	2	0	0	0	0	0	23	1
Swindon Town	Total		44	2	4	0	0	0	1	0	49	2
Notts County	2011–12	League One	39	2	4	1	1	0	0	0	44	3
Notts County	2012–13	League One	33	0	2	0	1	0	2	0	38	0
Notts County	2013–14	League One	42	7	1	0	1	0	1	0	45	7
Notts County	Total		114	9	7	1	3	0	3	0	127	10
Bradford City	2014–15	League One	23	1	3	0	2	0	1	0	29	1
Bradford City	2015–16	League One	2	0	—		1	0	—		3	0
Bradford City	Total		25	1	3	0	3	0	1	0	32	1
Peterborough United (loan)	2014–15	League One	2	0	—		—		—		2	0
Notts County (loan)	2015–16	League Two	14	2	1	0	—		0	0	15	2
Luton Town (loan)	2015–16	League Two	20	1	—		—		—		20	1
Luton Town	2016–17	League Two	34	2	3	0	0	0	4 (Note: Two appearances and one goal in EFL Trophy, two appearances in League Two play-offs)	1	41	3
Luton Town	2017–18	League Two	42	3	2	0	1	0	1 (Note: Appearance(s) in EFL Trophy)	0	46	3
Luton Town	2018–19	League One	17	0	0	0	0	0	4	1	21	1
Luton Town	2019–20	Championship	4	0	1	0	2	1	—		7	1
Luton Town	Total		117	6	6	0	3	1	9	2	135	9
Lincoln City	2019–20	League One	1	0	—		—		—		1	0
Northampton Town	2020–21	League One	14	1	0	0	—		1	0	15	1
Oldham Athletic	2021–22	League Two	6	0	0	0	0	0	0	0	6	0
Career total			402	25	23	1	15	2	18	2	458	30

== Managerial statistics ==
As of match played 8 November 2025

Managerial record by team and tenure
Team	From	To	Record					Ref.
Team	From	To	P	W	D	L	Win %	Ref.
Swansea City (caretaker)	4 December 2023	4 January 2024	7	3	2	2	42.86	
Swansea City	17 February 2025	11 November 2025	32	13	9	10	40.63	
Total			39	16	11	12	41.03	

== Honours ==
Luton Town

- EFL League Two runner-up: 2017–18
- EFL League One: 2018–19

Individual

- Notts County Player of the Year: 2013–14
- PFA Team of the Year: 2017–18 League Two
- Luton Town Player of the Season: 2017–18
