= Julian Kelly =

English footballer

Personal information
- Date of birth: 6 September 1989 (age 37)
- Place of birth: Enfield, London, England
- Height: 5 ft 9 in (1.75 m)
- Positions: Full-back; winger

Youth career
- ?–2006: Arsenal
- 2006–2008: Reading

Senior career*
Years	Team	Apps	(Gls)
2008–2011	Reading	7	(0)
2010	→ Wycombe Wanderers (loan)	9	(1)
2011	→ Lincoln City (loan)	21	(0)
2011–2013	Notts County	54	(4)
2014	Spalding United	?	(?)
2014	Carlton Town	?	(?)
2014–	Grantham Town	1	(0)
- * Club domestic league appearances and goals as of 11:08, 9 November 2014 (UTC)

Julian Kelly (born 6 September 1989) is an English footballer who plays for Grantham Town.

== Club career ==
Born in London, Kelly was with Arsenal until the age of 16 when he joined Reading as a scholar in June 2006. He finished the 2007–08 season with 27 appearances in the Reading reserves, playing in the position of left back. He featured for Reading on the bench in their opening game of the 2008–09 season, which they drew 0 – 0 with Nottingham Forest. He made his debut for Reading in the League Cup against Dagenham & Redbridge. He then made his league debut against Plymouth Argyle, playing in the right wing. On 21 January 2009, Reading manager Steve Coppell confirmed that his most likely replacement for the suspended Liam Rosenior against Wolverhampton Wanderers would be Kelly. He joined Wycombe Wanderers on an initial one-month emergency loan on 15 February 2010. On his debut for Wycombe Wanderers he scored from a cross for a 1–0 win over Millwall. In January 2011 Kelly joined Lincoln City on loan making his debut on 15 January in a 2–1 home defeat by Wycombe Wanderers.

On 1 June 2011, he signed a two-year contract with Notts County. Kelly scored his first goal for Notts, a thunderous volley, in 3 – 2 win over Tranmere Rovers. Similarly in 3–2 win against Scunthorpe United Kelly scored the winning the goal after an incisive pass from teammate Gavin Mahon. Kelly became a permanent fixture in Martin Allen's defence as Notts County climbed into the play-off positions midway through the season. In a 5–2 defeat to Sheffield United, Kelly came off the bench to score Notts' second goal. Kelly finished the 2011–12 season making 34 appearances overall and scoring 3 goals.

He made his first start of the 2012–13 campaign in a 2–1 win over Crewe Alexandra and made a further 23 appearances before being released at the end of the season.

In September 2013 he joined Grimsby Town on trial, but failed to earn a contract.

After a year out of the game, Kelly joined Northern Premier League Division One South side Spalding United in May 2014. He was with the club only a short time before moving to divisional rivals Carlton Town. In October 2014 he was on the move again, moving up a division to join Grantham Town.

== International career ==
Despite being born in England, he was called into the Republic of Ireland under-19 squad in January 2008.

== Personal life ==
His brother Oliver Kelly was also part of the Reading Academy. Kelly's older sister Natalie has been playing the lead female role in the Lion King in the West End whilst younger sister Siena recently won a place at the National School of Youth Ballet.

== Career statistics ==
As of match played 6 April 2013

Appearances and goals by club, season and competition
Club	Season	League			FA Cup		League Cup		Other		Total	
Club	Season	Division	Apps	Goals	Apps	Goals	Apps	Goals	Apps	Goals	Apps	Goals
Reading	2008–09	Championship	7	0	1	0	3	0	0	0	11	0
Reading	2009–10	Championship	0	0	0	0	1	0	—		1	0
Reading	2010–11	Championship	0	0	0	0	1	0	—		1	0
Reading	Total		7	0	1	0	5	0	0	0	13	0
Wycombe Wanderers (loan)	2009–10	League One	9	1	0	0	0	0	0	0	9	1
Lincoln City (loan)	2010–11	League Two	21	0	0	0	0	0	0	0	21	0
Notts County	2011–12	League One	32	3	4	0	1	0	0	0	37	3
Notts County	2012–13	League One	22	1	2	0	0	0	0	0	24	1
Notts County	Total		54	4	6	0	1	0	0	0	61	4
Career total			91	5	7	0	6	0	0	0	104	5
