= Neal Bishop =

English footballer

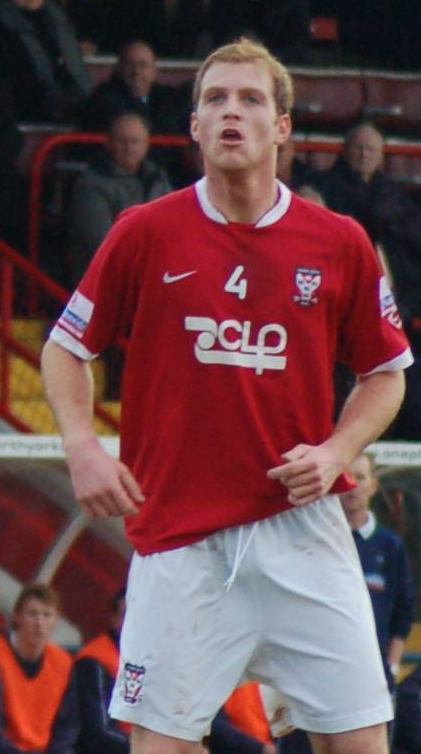
- Bishop playing for York City in 2007

Personal information
- Full name: Neal Robert Bishop
- Date of birth: 7 August 1981 (age 45)
- Place of birth: Stockton-on-Tees, England
- Height: 6 ft 1 in (1.86 m)
- Position: Midfielder

Youth career
- Middlesbrough

Senior career*
Years	Team	Apps	(Gls)
–2002	Billingham Town		
2002	Gateshead	10	(2)
2002–	Billingham Town		
2003–2004	Spennymoor United	38	(3)
2004–2005	Whitby Town	23	(1)
2005–2006	Scarborough	34	(1)
2006–2007	York City	59	(4)
2007–2009	Barnet	83	(3)
2009–2013	Notts County	168	(11)
2013–2014	Blackpool	35	(1)
2014–2018	Scunthorpe United	154	(11)
2018–2020	Mansfield Town	72	(3)
2020–2021	Scarborough Athletic	7	(0)
2021–2023	Gainsborough Trinity	35	(1)

International career
2007	England C	2	(0)

Managerial career
- 2022–2023: Gainsborough Trinity
- * Club domestic league appearances and goals as of 01:05, 2 May 2022 (UTC)

Neal Robert Bishop (born 7 August 1981) is an English football manager and footballer who played as a midfielder.

He previously played in the Football League for Barnet, Notts County, Blackpool, Scunthorpe United and Mansfield Town, as well as at Non-league level for Billingham Town, Spennymoor United, Whitby Town, Scarborough, York City and Scarborough Athletic. He also represented England C at international level.

== Club career ==
=== Early career ===
Born in Stockton-on-Tees, County Durham, Bishop began his career with Middlesbrough in their youth system. After being released by Middlesbrough as a teenager he moved to Northern League club Billingham Town and played there for a number of years. In a match in 2001, he played alongside his brother Craig, aged 16, and father Rob, aged 46, as the team had eight matches to play in 15 days towards the end of the 2000–01 season. He made 11 appearances and scored two goals for Gateshead in all competitions in the 2002–03 season, before leaving in October 2002 and re-signing for Billingham. He played for Spennymoor United in the 2003–04 season, making 38 appearances and scoring three goals. He made 25 appearances and scored one goal for Whitby Town in the 2004–05 season.

=== Scarborough ===
He signed for Scarborough of the Conference National in March 2005 on a contract until the end of the 2004–05 season, following a week-long trial. He made 11 appearances and scored one goal for Scarborough during this season, and signed a deal to keep him at the club for the 2005–06 season in May. Here, he made a name for himself and was chosen as captain for the 2005–06 season. His lip was cut in an alleged clash with Denny Ingram in the tunnel following a match against Halifax Town in November, which Bishop decided not to press charges against.

=== York City ===
He was signed by Scarborough's Conference rivals York City for an undisclosed nominal fee on 31 January 2006. He finished the season with 14 appearances and one goal for York and signed a new contract with the club in July. He scored the winning goal against Oxford United with a 20-yard volley on the final day of the 2006–07 season, meaning York secured a place in the Conference National play-offs. He was voted as the York City Clubman of the Year for the season the same day, finishing the season with 49 appearances and scoring three goals. Bishop rejected a new deal at York, saying he wanted his salary to fall in line with the club's top earners.

=== Barnet ===
He signed for League Two club Barnet in June 2007 on a free transfer as he was out of contract with York. He said he decided to join Barnet so he could fulfil a lifelong ambition of playing in the Football League. He made his debut against Morecambe on 11 August 2007 and was sent off for violent conduct in his second match against Norwich City in the League Cup on 14 August 2007, which resulted in a three-match suspension. He finished the 2007–08 season with 47 appearances and two goals for Barnet, and handed in a transfer request in April 2008 after turning down an improved contract with the club. Despite this, the club exercised their option to extend his contract for another season in May. He was removed from the transfer list at his own request after the start of the 2008–09 season.

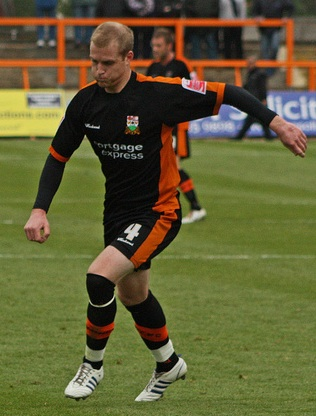
Bishop playing for Barnet in 2008

Bishop was appointed as Barnet's captain in November after Ismail Yakubu gave up the role. He suffered a fractured jaw after being kicked in the face during a match against Darlington by Ricky Ravenhill in December, which ruled him out for the Christmas period. He finished the season with 48 appearances, scoring one goal, and was offered a new contract at Barnet.

=== Notts County ===
Bishop agreed to join fellow League Two team Notts County on 20 May 2009, and a day later he signed a pre-contract agreement to join the club on 1 July. He made 51 appearances and scored one goal for the club during the 2009–10 season, in which County won the League Two title and thus promotion to League One. He signed a two-year contract extension with County on 5 July 2010, which contracted him at the club until June 2012. In January 2011, he scored in County's 1–1 draw against Premier League team Manchester City in the fourth round of the FA Cup, which saw them earn a replay at the City of Manchester Stadium. During the closing stages of the 2010–11 season, he was named as the new team captain by Paul Ince. He finished the 2010–11 season with 51 appearances and two goals, and was voted by supporters as Notts County's Player of the Year. On 10 May 2011, Bishop signed a new two-year contract with County, keeping him at the club until June 2013. His contract with the club was cancelled by mutual consent on 19 June 2013.

=== Blackpool ===
Bishop signed for Championship club Blackpool on 2 August 2013 on a five-month contract. He scored his first goal for Blackpool in a 2–1 win over AFC Bournemouth on 14 September 2013. On 2 December 2013, Bishop extended his contract at Blackpool until the end of the 2013–14 season.

=== Scunthorpe United ===
Bishop signed for newly promoted League One club Scunthorpe United on 19 June 2014 on a two-year contract.

=== Mansfield Town ===
Bishop signed for League Two club Mansfield Town on 6 June 2018. He was released by Mansfield at the end of the 2019–20 season.

=== Non-League ===
Bishop joined Scarborough Athletic in September 2020 after turning down offers from a number of clubs higher in the football pyramid. After the season was annulled, Bishop announced his departure from the club in March 2021.

On 17 May 2021, Bishop joined Gainsborough Trinity in a player-coach role. He held the role of manager at the club from May 2022, overseeing a play-off defeat before stepping down in September 2023.

On 24 May 2022, Bishop was appointed joint-manager at Gainsborough along with Damon Parkinson. Bishop resigned as manager and departed in September 2023, citing personal reasons.

== International career ==
Bishop was called up for the England national C team in May 2007 to play in the Four Nations Tournament. He made his debut in a 5–0 win over the Republic of Ireland on 22 May 2007, winning his second and final cap when England beat Wales 3–0 on 27 May. England won the tournament, having been unbeaten and not conceded a goal in three matches.

== Personal life ==
Bishop married his fiancé Frances in May 2014. The couple had their first child together, Oscar, in January 2013. Frances owned and ran a Children's outlet 'Pud'. She was also a candidate on Series 12 of The Apprentice which began in October 2016.

== Career statistics ==
As of 23 April 2022

Appearances and goals by club, season and competition
Club	Season	League			FA Cup		League Cup		Other		Total	
Club	Season	Division	Apps	Goals	Apps	Goals	Apps	Goals	Apps	Goals	Apps	Goals
Gateshead	2002–03	NPL Premier Division	10	2	1	0	—		—		11	2
Spennymoor United	2003–04	NPL Premier Division	38	3	0	0	—		0	0	38	3
Whitby Town	2004–05	NPL Premier Division	23	1	0	0	—		2 (Note: Appearance(s) in FA Trophy)	0	25	1
Scarborough	2004–05	Conference National	10	1	—		—		1 (Note: Appearance in Conference League Cup)	0	11	1
Scarborough	2005–06	Conference National	24	0	0	0	—		1	0	25	0
Scarborough	Total		34	1	0	0	—		2	0	36	1
York City	2005–06	Conference National	14	1	—		—		—		14	1
York City	2006–07	Conference National	45	3	2	0	—		2 (Note: Appearances in Conference National play-offs)	0	49	3
York City	Total		59	4	2	0	—		2	0	63	4
Barnet	2007–08	League Two	39	2	6	0	1	0	1 (Note: Appearance(s) in Football League Trophy)	0	47	2
Barnet	2008–09	League Two	44	1	2	0	1	0	1	0	48	1
Barnet	Total		83	3	8	0	2	0	2	0	95	3
Notts County	2009–10	League Two	43	1	6	0	1	0	1	0	51	1
Notts County	2010–11	League One	43	1	5	1	3	0	0	0	51	2
Notts County	2011–12	League One	41	2	4	0	1	0	0	0	46	2
Notts County	2012–13	League One	41	7	3	0	1	0	0	0	45	7
Notts County	Total		168	11	18	1	6	0	1	0	193	12
Blackpool	2013–14	Championship	35	1	1	0	0	0	—		36	1
Scunthorpe United	2014–15	League One	35	4	5	0	2	1	2	0	44	5
Scunthorpe United	2015–16	League One	42	1	3	0	1	0	1	0	47	1
Scunthorpe United	2016–17	League One	42	5	0	0	1	0	3 (Note: One appearance in EFL Trophy, two in League One play-offs)	0	46	5
Scunthorpe United	2017–18	League One	35	1	1	0	1	0	0	0	37	1
Scunthorpe United	Total		154	11	9	0	5	1	6	0	174	12
Mansfield Town	2018–19	League Two	44	3	1	0	1	1	2 (Note: Appearance in EFL Trophy, one in League Two play-offs)	0	48	4
Mansfield Town	2019–20	League Two	28	0	1	0	0	0	1	0	30	0
Mansfield Town	Total		72	3	2	0	1	1	3	0	78	4
Scarborough Athletic	2020–21	NPL Premier Division	7	0	1	0	—		0	0	8	0
Gainsborough Trinity	2021–22	NPL Premier Division	35	1	1	0	—		2	0	38	1
Career total			718	41	43	1	14	2	21	0	795	44

== Honours ==
Notts County

- Football League Two: 2009–10

Individual

- Notts County Player of the Year: 2010–11
- York City Clubman of the Year: 2006–07
