= Fabian Spiess =

German footballer (born 1994)

Personal information
- Full name: Fabian Spiess
- Date of birth: 22 February 1994 (age 32)
- Place of birth: Wesel, Germany
- Height: 1.88 m (6 ft 2 in)
- Position: Goalkeeper

Youth career
- 2010–2012: Notts County

Senior career*
Years	Team	Apps	(Gls)
2011–2015	Notts County	13	(0)
2011	→ Lewes (loan)	2	(0)
2012	→ Corby Town (loan)	5	(0)
2014–2015	→ Bristol Rovers (loan)	3	(0)
2015	Torquay United	19	(0)
2015–2016	Alfreton Town	1	(0)
2016	Boston United	18	(0)
2016–2017	Alfreton Town	38	(0)
2017–2019	Nantwich Town	0	(0)
- * Club domestic league appearances and goals

Fabian Spiess (born 22 February 1994) is a German former professional footballer who played as a goalkeeper.

== Career ==
Spiess joined the Notts County youth system in the 2010–11 season, and while still in the club's academy he signed for Isthmian League Premier Division side Lewes on loan in October 2011. He made his debut on 26 October in a Sussex Senior Challenge Cup 4–0 victory over Wick, before making his league bow in a 4–0 defeat of A.F.C. Hornchurch on 29 October. Having made three appearances for Lewes the loan came to an end in November after Spiess was injured in a training session with parent club County. He joined Corby Town of the Conference North on a youth loan on 1 March 2012. Spiess made his debut two days later in a 2–0 defeat away at Nuneaton Town and finished his loan at Corby with five appearances. His debut for County came as a 74th minute substitute for Stuart Nelson in the final day 4–1 victory at home to Colchester United on 5 May.

Spiess joined Bristol Rovers on an emergency loan on 5 December 2014 due to injuries to Steve Mildenhall and Will Puddy.

He moved to Nantwich Town in June 2017.

== Personal life ==
Spiess completed a master's degree in Sports Business Management from the University of Central Lancashire in 2019, going on to work with Athletes USA, a sport scholarship company.

== Career statistics ==
As of match played 26 December 2014

Appearances and goals by club, season and competition
Club	Season	League^{[A]}			FA Cup		League Cup		Other^{[B]}		Total	
Club	Season	Division	Apps	Goals	Apps	Goals	Apps	Goals	Apps	Goals	Apps	Goals
Notts County	2011–12	EFL League One	1	0	0	0	0	0	0	0	1	0
Notts County	2012–13	EFL League One	7	0	0	0	0	0	0	0	7	0
Notts County	2013–14	EFL League One	1	0	0	0	0	0	2	0	3	0
Notts County	2014–15	EFL League One	0	0	0	0	0	0	2	0	2	0
Notts County	Total		9	0	0	0	0	0	4	0	13	0
Lewes (loan)	2011–12	Isthmian League	2	0	0	0	–		1	0	3	0
Corby Town (loan)	2011–12	Football Conference	5	0	0	0	–		0	0	5	0
Bristol Rovers (loan)	2014–15	Football Conference	3	0	0	0	–		1	0	4	0
Torquay United	2015–16	National League	17	0	1	0	–		0	0	0	0
Career total			36	0	0	0	0	0	6	0	25	0

== Footnotes ==
A. The "League" column constitutes appearances and goals in the Football League, Football Conference and Isthmian League.
B. The "Other" column constitutes appearances and goals in Football League Trophy, Sussex Senior Challenge Cup and FA Trophy.
