= Liam Mitchell (footballer) =

English footballer

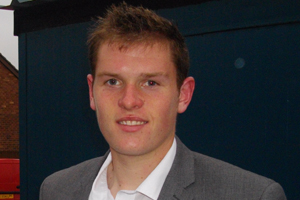
- Mitchell in 2011

Personal information
- Date of birth: 18 September 1992 (age 34)
- Place of birth: Nottingham, England
- Position: Goalkeeper

Youth career
- –2011: Notts County

Senior career*
Years	Team	Apps	(Gls)
2011–2013	Notts County	1	(0)
2011	→ Tamworth (loan)	10	(0)
2011	→ Lewes (loan)		
2012	→ Mansfield Town (loan)	3	(0)
2013	→ Tamworth (loan)	4	(0)
2013	→ Mansfield Town	1	(0)
2014–????	Shepshed Dynamo	1	(0)
- Sheffield
- Carlton Town
- West Bridgford
- Clifton All Whites
- * Club domestic league appearances and goals

Liam Mitchell (born 18 September 1992) is an English former footballer who played as a goalkeeper.

== Career ==
Mitchell came through the youth ranks at Nottingham Forest and then Notts County and signed a professional contract with Notts County in 2011 at the age of 18. He was handed squad number 12 and featured on the first team bench on a number of occasions before going out on loan to Conference National side Tamworth to gain first team experience. He became a first team regular at Tamworth at the age of only 18, making 10 Conference National starts during his loan spell at the club.

In October 2012, Mitchell joined Mansfield Town on loan to replace injured first choice goalkeeper Alan Marriott, starting in every game of his loan spell and keeping two clean sheets in those three games. Following an impressive showing in goal for Mansfield in a crucial 1–0 win over Forest Green Rovers in October 2012, his manager Paul Cox said of Mitchell, "he's a quality goalkeeper and is going to be an outstanding goalkeeper once he matures. We are glad we have got him. He is in competition with Mazza and Shane Redmond now."

Mitchell made his first team debut for Notts County in December 2012 against Rotherham United. In March 2013, Tamworth asked to take him on loan for a second time, and Mitchell again became a first team regular for the Conference National side.

Liam Mitchell is currently a goalkeeper for the non-league English side Dunkirk FC, In September 2022 he received a suspended jail sentence after attacking spectators following a match in which he played during the previous year.

== Career statistics ==
As of match played 18 December 2012.

Club	Season	League^{[A]}		FA Cup		League Cup		Other^{[B]}		Total	
Club	Season	Apps	Goals	Apps	Goals	Apps	Goals	Apps	Goals	Apps	Goals
Notts County	2010–11	0	0	0	0	0	0	0	0	0	0
Notts County	2011–12	0	0	0	0	0	0	0	0	0	0
Notts County	2012–13	0	0	1	0	0	0	0	0	1	0
Notts County	Total	0	0	1	0	0	0	0	0	1	0
Tamworth (loan)	2010–11	10	0	0	0	—		0	0	10	0
Lewes (loan)	2011–12	?	?	?	?	—		?	?	?	?
Mansfield Town (loan)	2012–13	3	0	0	0	—		0	0	3	0
Dunkirk	2022										
Career totals		13	0	1	0	0	0	0	0	14	0

== Footnotes ==
A. The "League" column constitutes appearances and goals in the Football League, Football Conference and Isthmian League.
B. The "Other" column constitutes appearances and goals in Football League Trophy.
