= Femi Orenuga =

English footballer

Personal information
- Full name: Kenny Oluwafemi Gbolahan Ademola Orenuga
- Date of birth: 18 March 1993 (age 33)
- Place of birth: Lewisham, England
- Height: 5 ft 6 in (1.68 m)
- Positions: Midfielder; winger

Youth career
- 2006–2008: Southend United

Senior career*
Years	Team	Apps	(Gls)
2008–2009	Southend United	0	(0)
2009–2012	Everton	0	(0)
2011	→ Notts County (loan)	2	(0)
2012–2014	AFC United	8	(1)
2014	Whitehawk	1	(0)
2014	Raufoss	4	(0)
2014	→ Raufoss 2	3	(0)
2015	Gloucester City	16	(3)
2015	Enfield Town		
2015–2016	Gloucester City	7	(0)
2016	Wealdstone	2	(0)
2016	→ Bedford Town (dual registration)		
2016	Corby Town		
2016	Farnborough	3	(0)
2016–2017	Bedford Town	15	(3)
2018	Peninsula Strikers	5	(2)
- * Club domestic league appearances and goals as of 5 March 2016

Kenny Oluwafemi Gbolahan Ademola Orenuga (born 18 March 1993) is an English footballer who plays as a midfielder.

== Career ==
=== Southend United ===
Born in Lewisham, London, Orenuga joined Southend United in 2006 after he impressed the club following his recommendation by an agent. Not long after joining the club he helped Southend win the Norhalne Cup in Denmark, attracting interest from FC Copenhagen and Brøndby in the process. He became the youngest player to appear for Southend United when he came on as a 93rd-minute substitute in their 3–1 victory over Luton Town in the FA Cup second round on 29 November 2008.

=== Everton ===
In March 2009, Orenuga agreed to sign for Premier League team Everton on 1 July for an undisclosed fee believed to be £30,000, increasing based on first team appearances. He joined on a two-year academy scholarship. He was released from the club on 18 May 2012.

==== Loan to Notts County ====
On 21 October 2011, it was confirmed by Notts County that Orenuga had joined on a month-long loan deal.

=== Sweden ===
On 9 November 2012 joined to Sweden and signed a two-year contract with AFC United.

=== Whitehawk ===
Following an unsuccessful trial with Crewe Alexandra earlier in the summer, Orenuga played for Northern Premier League First Division South side Carlton Town in pre-season as well as for Dagenham & Redbridge before signing for Whitehawk in August 2014. He left the club having appeared just once from the bench against Farnborough on 30 August.

=== Norway ===
In September 2014, after a trial with the club, he signed for Norwegian second division side Raufoss. He featured for their first team four times, and three times for the reserves.

=== Back in England ===
He joined Gloucester City for the first time in January 2015, and played his part in the run-in towards the end of the 2014–15 season. He started the 2015–16 season at Enfield Town, before re-joining Gloucester City in October 2015. On 5 February 2016 he signed for Wealdstone, and on 19 March 2016 he joined Bedford Town on dual registration terms. On 16 May 2016 he signed a one-year deal with Corby Town.

He moved on to Farnborough, signing for them on 24 November 2016, however the spell was short-lived as he re-joined Bedford Town in December 2016.

Prior to the 2018-season of the Victorian State League Division 2 he joined Peninsula Strikers in Australia until the end of the season. He scored two goals in five league games before leaving the club in June 2018.

== Personal life ==
His younger brother, Keith, is a student in Arsenal FC's Centre of Excellence. He attended Blackheath Bluecoat Church of England School.
