= George Nicholas (footballer) =

English footballer

Personal information
- Date of birth: 19 December 1992 (age 33)
- Place of birth: Watford, England
- Position: Midfielder

Team information
- Current team: Harefield United

Senior career*
Years	Team	Apps	(Gls)
2011–2012	Notts County	1	(0)
2011–2012	→ Lewes (loan)	?	(?)
2012–2013	Wealdstone	3	(0)
2013	→ Northwood (loan)	9	(2)
2013–2016	Northwood	82	(9)
2016–2017	Harrow Borough	?	(?)
2017–2020	Potters Bar Town	?	(?)
2020–2023	Hanwell Town	?	(?)
2023	Northwood	1	(0)
2023	Chesham United	1	(0)
2024–	Harefield United	18	(0)
- * Club domestic league appearances and goals as of 7 January 2025 (UTC)

George Anton Nicholas (born 19 December 1992) is an English semi-professional footballer. He currently plays for Combined Counties Football League side Harefield United.

Nicholas also had a short stint at Wealdstone who he joined following his release from Notts County, before spending three years at Northwood, one with Harrow Borough and three with Potters Bar Town and Hanwell Town.

== Career ==
Nicholas made his debut for Notts County on 7 May 2011 in a 1–1 draw against Brighton & Hove Albion.

In September, he joined Lewes on loan, initially for a monthlong period.

In May 2012 he was released by Notts County, along with 12 other players.

He signed for Wealdstone after impressing during the 2012–13 pre-season and made three league substitute appearances for the club. Nicholas then joined Southern Football League club Northwood in January 2013, making his début in a defeat to Aylesbury.

Nicholas scored his first goal for Northwood with a 25-yard strike against Barton Rovers on 9 February 2013, and then scored his second on 9 March against Leighton Town. Injuries however limited him to only nine league appearances during his time at the Woods and his loan spell expired at the end of the 2012/13 season.

He signed on a permanent basis for Northwood in the summer of 2013. Having sustained an injury in September 2014, Nicholas returned to fitness in January 2015 playing a few more times. However, Nicholas took a break from football with Northwood in late January 2015 to take up the opportunity of modelling in New York. Nicholas made his return to Northwood as a substitute, coming on in a 3–2 home win over Aylesbury United on 11 April 2015.

In the summer of 2016 Nicholas moved up a division to sign for Isthmian League Premier Division side Harrow Borough, along with Northwood teammates Andy Lomas, Max Holland and Steve Brown.

Then, in the summer of 2017, Nicholas moved with Brown and Lomas to Potters Bar Town where the trio helped the Scholars earn promotion to the Isthmian League Premier Division.

In 2020, Nicholas moved to Isthmian League side Hanwell Town.

In January 2023, Nicholas rejoined Isthmian League side Northwood, but sustained an injury shortly afterwards. After a short spell at Chesham United, Nicholas joined Combined Counties Football League side Harefield United in 2024.
