= Charlie Allen (footballer, born 1992) =

English footballer

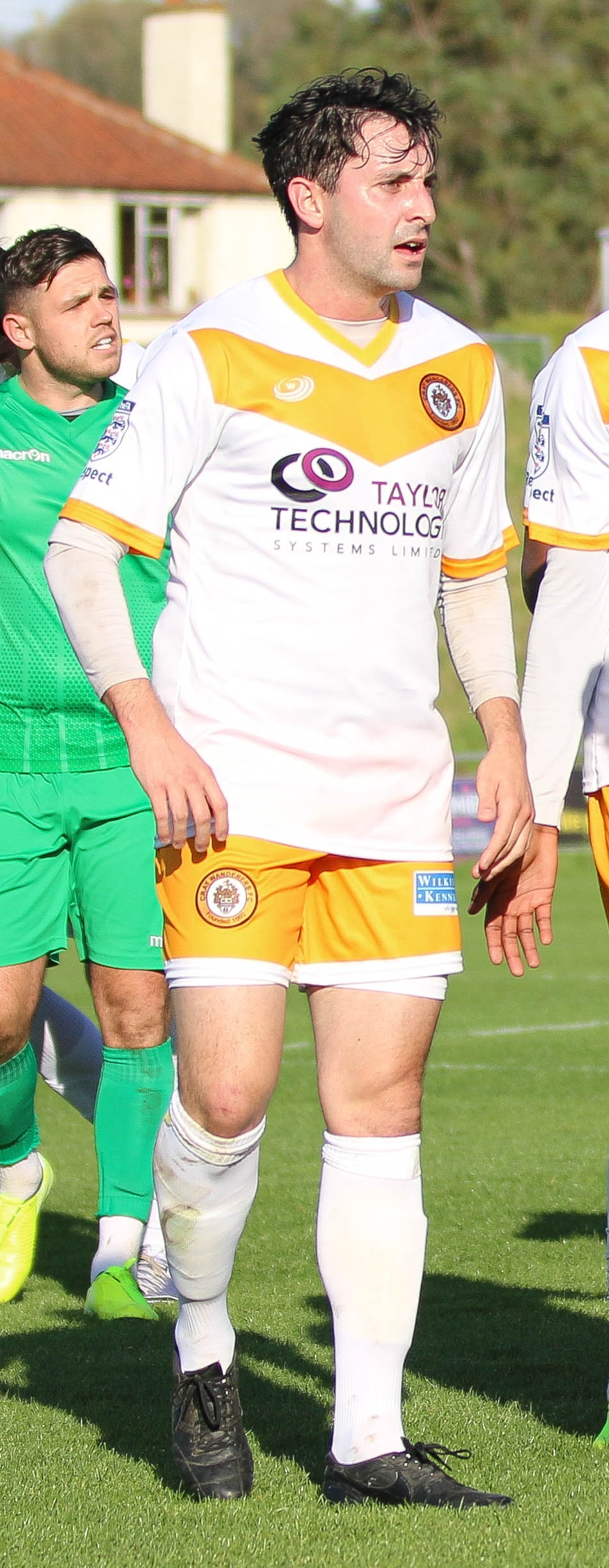
- Allen playing for Cray Wanderers in 2019

Personal information
- Date of birth: 24 March 1992 (age 34)
- Place of birth: Slough, England
- Height: 6 ft 0 in (1.83 m)
- Position: Midfielder

Team information
- Current team: Cray Wanderers

Youth career
- –2006: Reading
- 2006–2010: Brentford
- 2010–2011: Dagenham & Redbridge

Senior career*
| Years | Team | Apps | (Gls) |
| 2010–2011 | Dagenham & Redbridge | ? | (?) |
| 2011 | → Billericay Town (dual registration) | ? | (?) |
| 2011–2012 | Notts County | 9 | (0) |
| 2012–2014 | Gillingham | 37 | (2) |
| 2013–2014 | → Tamworth (loan) | 1 | (0) |
| 2014–2015 | Margate | 56 | (20) |
| 2016–2017 | Farnborough | ? | (?) |
| 2018 | Reading City | ? | (?) |
| 2018–2019 | Grays Athletic | 12 | (2) |
| 2019 | Greenwich Borough | 1 | (0) |
| 2019 | Dulwich Hamlet | ? | (?) |
| 2019- | Cray Wanderers | 38 | (3) |
- * Club domestic league appearances and goals as of 16:32, 25 September 2021 (UTC)

Charlie Allen (born 24 March 1992) is an English footballer who plays as a midfielder for Isthmian League club Cray Wanderers.

== Playing career ==
Allen began his career at Brentford joining the club in 2006 from Reading, whilst his father was first-team manager at Griffin Park. Allen progressed into the youth team but was not offered a professional contract at the end of his two-year scholarship. During the summer he spent sometime at a Swedish fourth division club Ånge IF. After that Allen joined Dagenham & Redbridge youth academy, playing for Billericay Town on dual-registration, before signing at Notts County for the start of the 2011–12 season. He made his debut in a 2–0 defeat to Preston North End at Deepdale on 27 August 2011, before he was replaced by Alan Judge after 67 minutes.

In May 2012 he was released by the club, along with 12 other players. Two months later he was signed by Football League Two side Gillingham on an initial one-year deal, with the option of extending for a further season. He made his debut for Gillingham on 18 August in 3–1 win against Bradford City.

On 31 October 2013 Allen was loaned to Tamworth.

On 14 February 2014, Allen had his contract at Gillingham cancelled by mutual consent. The following month he signed for Margate of the Isthmian League Premier Division.

On 4 June 2015, Allen left Margate.

Allen signed for Isthmian League Premier Division side Cray Wanderers in the summer of 2019.

== Personal life ==
He is the son of ex-Gillingham manager Martin Allen, and grandson of ex-Reading player Dennis Allen.

== Honours ==
Gillingham

- Football League Two: 2012–13
