= Martin Allen =

English footballer and manager

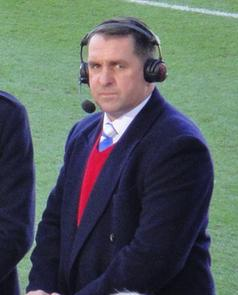
- Allen in 2013

Personal information
- Full name: Martin James Allen
- Date of birth: 14 August 1965 (age 61)
- Place of birth: Reading, Berkshire, England
- Height: 5 ft 10 in (1.78 m)
- Position: Midfielder

Senior career*
Years	Team	Apps	(Gls)
1984–1989	Queens Park Rangers	136	(16)
1989–1995	West Ham United	190	(25)
1995–1997	Portsmouth	45	(4)
1997–1998	Southend United	5	(0)
Total		376	(45)

International career
1985	England U19	3	(0)
1986–1987	England U21	2	(0)

Managerial career
- –1999: Portsmouth Reserves
- 2003–2004: Barnet
- 2004–2006: Brentford
- 2006–2007: Milton Keynes Dons
- 2007: Leicester City
- 2008–2009: Cheltenham Town
- 2011: Barnet
- 2011–2012: Notts County
- 2012: Barnet
- 2012–2013: Gillingham
- 2014–2016: Barnet
- 2016–2017: Eastleigh
- 2018: Barnet
- 2018: Chesterfield
- * Club domestic league appearances and goals

Martin James Allen (born 14 August 1965) is an English football manager and former player.

He played more than 100 games as a midfielder for both Queens Park Rangers and West Ham United before finishing his playing career with Portsmouth and Southend United. Five years later, he took his first job in management, at non-league Barnet. He has since managed Brentford, Milton Keynes Dons, Leicester City, Cheltenham Town and Notts County. He rejoined Barnet as manager on 16 April 2012 on a short-term, three-match contract succeeding Lawrie Sanchez. In July 2012 he became manager of Gillingham and in the 2012–13 season led the team to the Football League Two title, earning Allen his first promotion as a manager and Gillingham's first divisional title in 49 years. He was sacked as Gillingham manager in October 2013. Allen rejoined Barnet for a fourth spell in 2014, leading the Bees back into League Two before dropping divisions to join Eastleigh in December 2016, a role he held only until the following February.

== Playing career ==
Often referred to by his nickname of "Mad Dog", Allen began his career with Queens Park Rangers, signing professional in 1983 and spending six years at Loftus Road playing in the 1986 League Cup final defeat against Oxford United, before a £670,000 move to West Ham United. Signed by manager Lou Macari, Allen made his debut on 26 August 1989 in a 3–2 home win against Plymouth Argyle. He scored the second goal, the other West Ham goals coming from David Kelly and Kevin Keen. Under manager Billy Bonds Allen was part of the team which won promotion to the First Division in 1991 and to the Premier League in 1993. Allen was frequently booked during his West Ham career and had a reputation for poor discipline. He was sent off in a match on 17 January 1990 for a two-footed lunge on Derby County's Mark Patterson. During a game on 30 November 1991 against Sheffield Wednesday, managed by Allen's manager at Queens Park Rangers, Trevor Francis, Allen was booked after only 20 seconds of being on the pitch for a jump tackle on Carlton Palmer which saw Palmer carried off with a suspected broken leg. Although not sent-off, West Ham manager Bonds fined Allen a week's wages. During his time at Queens Park Rangers Allen had been refused permission, by manager Francis, to attend the birth of his first child as Allen would miss an important match. Allen attended the birth and was disciplined by the club. Under Bonds and Harry Redknapp Allen formed a successful partnership with Peter Butler with Allen contributing 34 goals from midfield in 234 appearances. However, by 1995 team discipline was poor at West Ham and with Allen playing alongside Julian Dicks, John Moncur and Don Hutchison bookings were commonplace. Allen was again dismissed in a match against Queens Park Rangers on 3 May 1995 after fouling Rufus Brevett. He would play only five more games before being allowed to leave.

Allen stayed with the Hammers until September 1995 when he made a £500,000 switch to Portsmouth after a successful loan spell at Fratton Park. After three frustrating years with Pompey, which took in a brief loan stint at Southend United, he retired and began a coaching career.

== Management career ==
=== Early years ===
Allen began his management career in the Winchester City youth system and with Portsmouth Reserves. He was sacked from the latter role in February 1999.

=== Reading ===
Allen was appointed assistant manager at hometown club Reading in January 2000, where he joined Alan Pardew when the Royals were in the relegation zone. The team produced championship form in their closing 20 fixtures, winning 12 and drawing 4 to secure a top 10 finish. Allen was sacked in November 2001.

=== Barnet ===
Allen's first full manager role was at Conference side Barnet, from March 2003 to March 2004. He succeeded Peter Shreeves, to whom he was assistant manager from March 2002. Allen built a team from scratch in pre-season of the 2003–04 campaign. The team shot straight to the top end of the table, however Allen left for Brentford with a few weeks of the season remaining in a move that disappointed many Barnet fans. Under the guidance of new manager Paul Fairclough, the Bees made the play-offs but were beaten in the semi-finals by Shrewsbury Town.

=== Brentford ===
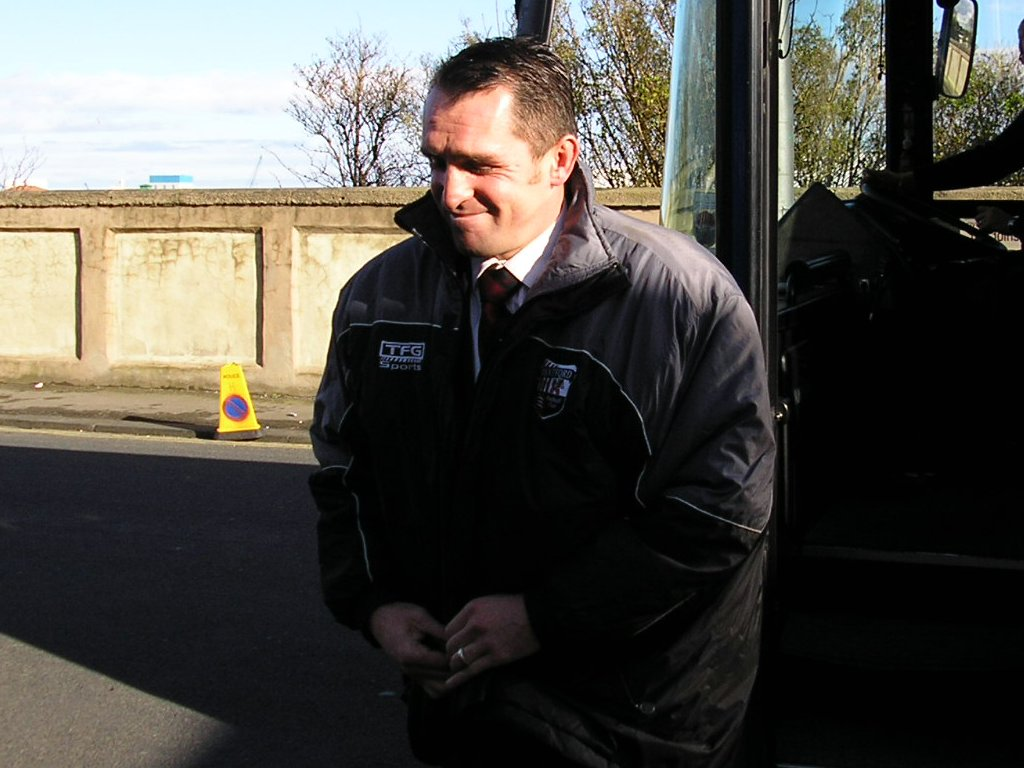
Allen exiting the Brentford team bus at Victoria Park in 2005.

Allen took over from Wally Downes at Second Division side Brentford in March 2004. He had a good run at the club, saving them from relegation to the Third Division in what remained of the 2003–04 season. In the 2004–05 and 2005–06 seasons he took Brentford to the play-offs with fourth and third-place finishes respectively, but they were eliminated by Sheffield Wednesday and Swansea City respectively in the semi-finals on both occasions. Allen won press attention during the 2004–05 season for the success of his self-described "two bob team", which was composed of ageing pros (John Salako, Andy Myers, Scott Fitzgerald and Jamie Lawrence), free transfers (Deon Burton, Chris Hargreaves, Stewart Talbot and Isaiah Rankin) and young guns who would go on to play in the Premier League (Jay Tabb, Stephen Hunt, Sam Sodje and Michael Turner). Allen took Brentford to the fifth round of the FA Cup in two consecutive years, going out to Premier League sides Southampton in the 2004–05 season (losing 3–1 in a replay, after a 2–2 draw at St Mary's) and Charlton Athletic 3–1 in the 2005–06 season. He also was in charge of one of the major giant killings in the fourth round in the 2005–06 season, beating Premier League side Sunderland 2–1.

At Brentford, he proved to be a very popular manager with the fans and an object of curiosity to opponents and media alike due to his unconventional managerial methods, which paid off due to the relative success Brentford had under him on a limited budget. He participated in a 25-mile sponsored bike ride in November 2005 to raise funds for Brentford. To inspire the team, Allen swam in the Tees before a 1–0 FA Cup fourth round replay victory over Hartlepool United in February 2005 and jumped naked into the Solent before Brentford's 2–2 draw at Southampton in the following round. In May 2006, Allen announced his resignation as manager of Brentford, citing lack of Board commitment to investing in the team to take it to the next level. In July 2006 he completed his UEFA Pro Licence in coaching. With the club struggling in League One in late 2010, there was speculation that Allen would replace Andy Scott as manager, but the reports were quashed by Brentford chief executive Andrew Mills.

=== Milton Keynes Dons ===
Allen then dropped down a level to manage League Two team Milton Keynes Dons for the 2006–07 season, a club with heavy financial backing and ambitions from owner Pete Winkelman, albeit one that had been in severe decline for the past few years and had dropped from the Championship to League Two in three seasons. Allen managed to arrest the club's decline and took his team to the play-offs, but lost in the semi-finals to Shrewsbury Town.

=== Leicester City ===
In May 2007, Allen became the new manager at Championship side Leicester City, after Leicester and Milton Keynes Dons had negotiated a compensation package.

In August 2007, striker Jimmy Floyd Hasselbaink agreed contract terms with Leicester and chairman Milan Mandarić invited him to undergo a medical at Leicester. But when Hasselbaink arrived in Leicester on 13 August, Allen told him that the medical was no longer going take place. Six days later, Mandarić confirmed an interest in striker Derek Riordan, who was lacking first team football at Celtic. However, Allen refused to make an offer for Riordan, which further aggravated Mandarić. Relations with chairman Milan Mandarić quickly deteriorated and his contract was terminated by mutual consent on 29 August 2007 after just four games in charge.

After leaving Leicester, Allen declared his interest in managing Swindon Town, which eventually went to Maurice Malpas.

=== Cheltenham Town ===
Allen was appointed as manager of Cheltenham Town on 15 September 2008, on a three-year contract. His father, Dennis, had been manager at Whaddon Road between 1974 and 1979. With financial difficulties hitting the club and an increasingly troubled dressing room atmosphere, the entire Cheltenham squad were put up for sale. Allen allowed key players to leave mid-season either on loan or for reduced prices, contributing to a run of results which left Cheltenham near the foot of the League Two table. On 20 October 2009 and amidst poor results on the pitch, Allen was suspended by Cheltenham Town and placed on gardening leave pending an internal investigation into allegations that he racially abused a nightclub bouncer. In November Gloucestershire police announced that no action would be taken against Allen concerning the alleged nightclub incident. He remained on leave whilst Cheltenham Town considered his future at the club. On 11 December it was announced he had left the club. In January 2010 he was appointed part-time scout for Queens Park Rangers.

=== Return to Barnet ===
On 23 March 2011, Allen returned to his first managerial club, Barnet, until the end of the 2010–11 season. He was working on an eight-game contract but left after only three games, in which Barnet were unbeaten, to take charge of Notts County.

=== Notts County ===
Allen took charge of Notts County on 11 April 2011 signing a one-year rolling contract. Notts County won eight points out of the seven games Allen was in charge of at the end of the 2010–11 season, enough for them to avoid relegation. Allen was named League One Manager of the Month in September 2011 after leading the team to four wins and a draw in the league.

Allen was sacked by Notts County on 18 February 2012.

=== Third spell at Barnet ===
Allen was appointed caretaker manager of Barnet on 16 April 2012 for the last three games of the 2011–12 season, replacing Lawrie Sanchez. Barnet managed two wins under Allen's managership, finished 22nd and avoided relegation from League Two with a 2–1 win on 5 May 2012 on the last day of the season, against Burton Albion. Following the end of the season, Allen's contract ended.

=== Gillingham ===
On 5 July 2012, Allen was appointed manager of Gillingham signing a two-year contract. His first match as Gillingham manager came on 14 August 2012, a 2–1 away win against Bristol City in the League Cup. While at Gillingham, Allen oversaw the Kent side's best ever start to a league season. He also broke the club record for most away wins in a football league season with a 1–0 win over Chesterfield, the eleventh of the season on 23 February 2013. On 6 April 2013 Gillingham secured promotion to League One, Allen's first ever promotion in his career as a manager. They secured the League Two title with a 2–2 draw against AFC Wimbledon at Priestfield on 20 April. On 20 May 2013, Allen was crowned League 2 Manager of the Year by the LMA for his achievements with the club. Allen was sacked by Gillingham in October 2013 after sixteen months in charge. Gillingham had won just two games from eleven played on their return to League One.

=== Fourth spell at Barnet ===
Allen was appointed head coach of Barnet on 19 March 2014 until the end of the 2014–15 season, marking his fourth spell at the club. He coached them to the 2014–15 Football Conference championship on 25 April 2015 to secure promotion to League Two. Barnet comfortably avoided relegation in their first season back in League Two, finishing 15th. However, despite the Bees starting the 2016–17 season just outside the play-off zone in 8th place, Allen made an unexpected request to terminate his contract to join National League side Eastleigh. The request was granted on 1 December 2016.

=== Eastleigh ===
On 1 December 2016, Eastleigh had confirmed that Allen had joined up with them taking the Manager's position previously help by Ronnie Moore. His first game incharge was in the FA Cup against FC Halifax Town which ended 3–3. This required a replay in which Eastleigh went away to Halifax and won 2–0. For the third round of the FA Cup Allen and Eastleigh were drawn an away match against Brentford. BBCs Football Focus interviewed Allen in the lead up to the game and he revealed he almost quit football due to health problems while suffering from stress at Barnet. Eastleigh lost their game against Brentford 5–1. Allen was fired by Eastleigh on 22 February 2017 after only winning two of his 14 games in charge.

=== Fifth spell at Barnet ===
On 19 March 2018, the departure of Graham Westley and the return of Allen as manager of Barnet was announced. On 10 May 2018, it was announced that Allen had left the club, following relegation from the Football League.

=== Chesterfield ===
Less than a week after leaving Barnet, Allen was appointed manager of Chesterfield, who themselves had seen relegation from the Football League at the end of the 2017–18 season. Allen was sacked on 27 December 2018, with the club sitting third bottom of the National League table.

== Personal life ==
=== Family ===
His cousins, Paul Allen, Bradley Allen and Clive Allen, were also footballers, as was his uncle Les Allen. His father, Dennis, played for Reading, Charlton Athletic and Bournemouth & Boscombe Athletic. His son Charlie Allen played under his management at several clubs. His nephew Harry Grant played professionally, and Harry's brother Freddie trained with Oxford United's youth team before being released by the club.

=== Business career ===
Having run his own soccer schools programme across 13 towns while still playing professionally. Allen, a UEFA Pro Licence holder and a graduate of the LMA's Certificate in Applied Management at Warwick University, created the company Pro FC which finds young people with the potential to become footballers. He is also non-exec director of the football charity, Coaching for Hope.

=== Journalism ===
In December 2013 Allen began writing for the Daily Mail. His column, "Mad Dog on Monday", is published online via the Daily Mail's website, Mail Online Sport.

== Managerial statistics ==
As of 26 December 2018

Managerial record by team and tenure
Team	From	To	Record				
Team	From	To	P	W	D	L	Win %
Barnet	March 2003	March 2004	47	20	17	10	42.55
Brentford	18 March 2004	31 May 2006	124	54	36	34	43.55
Milton Keynes Dons	21 June 2006	25 May 2007	55	28	11	16	50.91
Leicester City	25 May 2007	29 August 2007	4	2	1	1	50.00
Cheltenham Town	15 September 2008	11 December 2009	60	13	19	28	21.67
Barnet	23 March 2011	11 April 2011	3	2	1	0	66.67
Notts County	11 April 2011	18 February 2012	43	16	10	17	37.21
Barnet (caretaker)	16 April 2012	11 June 2012	3	2	0	1	66.67
Gillingham	5 July 2012	13 October 2013	64	27	17	20	42.19
Barnet	19 March 2014	1 December 2016	135	57	35	43	42.22
Eastleigh	1 December 2016	22 February 2017	14	2	5	7	14.29
Barnet	19 March 2018	9 May 2018	8	5	1	2	62.50
Chesterfield	15 May 2018	27 December 2018	30	7	12	11	23.33
Total			591	235	165	191	39.76

== Honours ==
=== As a player ===
Queens Park Rangers

- Football League Cup runner-up: 1985–86

West Ham United

- Football League Second Division runner-up: 1990–91

Individual

- PFA Team of the Year: 1992–93 First Division

=== As a manager ===
Brentford

- Supporters Direct Cup: 2004

Gillingham

- Football League Two: 2012–13

Barnet

- Conference Premier: 2014–15

Individual

- Football League One Manager of the Month: September 2004, February 2006, September 2011
- BBC Radio London Sports Personality of the Year: 2005
- Football League Two Manager of the Month: August 2012, January 2013
- LMA League Two Manager of the Season: 2012–13
