= Jude Stirling =

English footballer

Personal information
- Full name: Jude Barrington Stirling
- Date of birth: 29 June 1982 (age 44)
- Place of birth: Enfield, London, England
- Position: Defender

Youth career
- Broadwater United
- Luton Town

Senior career*
| Years | Team | Apps | (Gls) |
| 1999–2002 | Luton Town | 10 | (0) |
| 2002 | → Stevenage Borough (loan) | 3 | (0) |
| 2002–2003 | Stevenage Borough | 17 | (1) |
| 2003–2004 | St Albans City | 3 | (0) |
| 2003 | → Boreham Wood (loan) | 16 | (1) |
| 2003–2004 | → Hornchurch (loan) | 13 | (1) |
| 2004 | → Boreham Wood (loan) | | |
| 2004–2005 | Dover Athletic | 9 | (1) |
| 2005 | Tamworth | 5 | (0) |
| 2005 | Grays Athletic | 4 | (1) |
| 2005 | Kingsbury Town | 18 | (0) |
| 2005–2006 | Oxford United | 6 | (0) |
| 2006 | Lincoln City | 22 | (0) |
| 2006–2007 | Peterborough United | 16 | (1) |
| 2007 | → Milton Keynes Dons (loan) | 4 | (0) |
| 2007–2011 | Milton Keynes Dons | 81 | (4) |
| 2010 | → Grimsby Town (loan) | 6 | (0) |
| 2011 | → Barnet (loan) | 8 | (0) |
| 2011–2012 | Notts County | 1 | (0) |
| 2014 | Billericay Town | 5 | (1) |
| 2015–2016 | Brimsdown | | |
| Total | | 247 | (11) |
- * Club domestic league appearances and goals as of 20:15, 7 May 2012 (UTC)

Jude Barrington Stirling (born 29 June 1982) is an English former footballer who played as a defender.

He has previously played for Luton Town, Stevenage Borough, St Albans City, Boreham Wood, Hornchurch, Dover Athletic, Tamworth, Grays Athletic, Oxford United, Lincoln City, Peterborough United, Milton Keynes Dons, Grimsby Town, Barnet, Notts County and Billericay Town.

== Career ==
=== Luton Town ===
Stirling is a product of the Broadwater United football academy run by his father Clasford Stirling in Broadwater Farm, north London, he moved to join Luton Town as a junior and was added to the club's first team squad the 1999–2000 season. He did not make his debut until the following season when he was started against Swansea City in a league game on 16 September 2000. He would make a total of 10 appearances for Town in his first season, in all competitions. During the 2001–02 season, and following two further games for The Hatters, Stirling was loaned out to Conference National side Stevenage Borough. He remained with Borough until March, when Luton released him.

=== Stevenage Borough ===
Following his release from Luton, Stirling signed for Borough on a free transfer almost straight away and remained with the club until the end of the season as a permanent player. During the 2002–03 campaign, Stirling made 14 appearances in all competitions before leaving the club in January 2003.

=== St Albans City and Boreham Wood ===
Stirling joined Conference South club St Albans City on loan, debuting in the 1–0 Isthmian League Premier Division victory over Harrow Borough on 18 January 2003 and going on to play a further three times for the club, twice in the league, during his month with the club. He then linked up with Boreham Wood on loan for the remainder of the season, debuting in the 1–0 Isthmian League Premier Division defeat at Aldershot Town on 1 February 2003.

=== Dover Athletic ===
At the start of the 2004–05 season, Stirling signed for Dover Athletic, who at the time had suffered three straight relegations from the Conference National and were now plying their trade in the Southern Football League regional divisions. He was taken on trial by Russell Slade at Grimsby Town during his time at Dover but was not offered a contract.

=== Tamworth and Grays Athletic ===
Following a trial with Conference National side Tamworth, Stirling signed for the club in March 2005. He made his debut in the 3–0 home victory over Northwich Victoria on 12 March 2005 and made a total of five appearances for the side before departing at the end of the month to join Grays Athletic. He made his Grays debut in the 1–1 home Football Conference South draw with Hayes on 12 April 2005 and played a further three times for the club scoring a solitary goal in the 3–0 victory at Maidenhead United on 23 April.

=== Oxford United ===
At the start of the 2005–06 season, following another successful trial, Stirling returned to the Football League and signed a one-year deal with Oxford United. Oxford struggled in their League Two campaign with Stirling making 14 appearances for the club in all competitions. In January 2006, he was released from his contract.

=== Lincoln City ===
He then joined Keith Alexander and his Lincoln City side who were looking for promotion to League One. Stirling made six appearances for The Imps, all coming from the substitute bench. Following the club's unsuccessful promotion challenge, in which they were defeated by local rivals Grimsby Town in the play-off semi final, Stirling was released by the club at the end of the season following the end of his contract.

=== Peterborough United ===
Following his release from City, his former manager Keith Alexander was appointed manager at Imps rivals Peterborough United and Stirling became one of a number of ex-Lincoln players signed up at London Road in the summer of 2006. For the first time in a while, Stirling became a first team regular and notched up 28 appearances for United, but when his manager was sacked midway through the season, Stirling was loaned out to Milton Keynes Dons where he remained until the end of the 2006–07 season.

=== Milton Keynes Dons ===
Stirling was signed by Paul Ince at the start of the 2007–08 campaign, and became an instant hit with the promotion chasing League Two side. During MK Dons' League Two triumph of 2007–08, he was occasionally experimented as a striker, and gained popularity amongst Dons fans for his versatility, sheer effort and very long throw ins. As well as winning the League Two title, Stirling and the Dons also defeated Grimsby Town in the Football League Trophy final at Wembley Stadium. During the 2008–09 season, Paul Ince had left to take up the managerial position at Blackburn Rovers, and his replacement Roberto Di Matteo favoured him as the club's first choice right back. Stirling was ever present in the season, which eventually saw the club challenge for promotion to the Championship, however they were defeated over two legs in the play-offs against Scunthorpe United, with Stirling having his penalty saved by Joe Murphy in the shootout. During the 2009–10 season, Paul Ince returned as manager. In March 2010, he joined Grimsby Town on loan for the rest of the season. Stirling went out on loan again, this time to Barnet, in March 2011.

=== Notts County ===
In September 2011, he then signed for Notts County. In May 2012 he was released by the club, along with 12 other players.

=== Return to non-League ===
Since leaving Notts County, Stirling has gone on to feature for both Billericay Town and Brimsdown.

== Playing style ==
He's known for his long-throwing ability.

== Honours ==
Milton Keynes Dons

- Football League Two: 2007–08
- Football League Trophy: 2007–08
