= 2013 OSN Cup squads =

The following is a list of squads for each nation who competed at the 2013 OSN Cup in Saudi Arabia from 5 to 9 September 2013. Each squad consisted of 22 players, 2 of which had to be goalkeepers. Replacement of injured players was permitted until 24 hours before the team's game. Players marked (c) were named as captain for their national team.

Squads are as of 5 September 2013 15:00 GMT

== New Zealand ==
Head coach: Ricki Herbert

No.	Pos.	Player	Date of birth (age)	Caps	Goals	Club
1	GK	Glen Moss	19 January 1983 (age 43)	21	0	(New Zealand Football) Wellington Phoenix
2	DF	Winston Reid (c)	3 July 1988 (age 38)	14	1	(The Football Association) West Ham United
3	DF	Tony Lochhead	12 January 1982 (age 44)	43	1	(New Zealand Football) Wellington Phoenix
4	DF	Ben Sigmund	3 February 1981 (age 45)	29	2	(New Zealand Football) Wellington Phoenix
5	DF	Tommy Smith	31 March 1990 (age 36)	22	2	(The Football Association) Ipswich Town
6	MF	Jake Butler	12 November 1984 (age 42)	0	0	(New Zealand Football) Waitakere United
7	MF	Leo Bertos	20 December 1981 (age 44)	52	0	(New Zealand Football) Wellington Phoenix
10	FW	Chris Killen	8 October 1981 (age 45)	47	15	(Chinese Football Association) Chongqing
12	GK	Jacob Spoonley	21 March 1987 (age 39)	2	0	(New Zealand Football) Auckland City
13	MF	Chris James	4 July 1987 (age 39)	16	1	(Football Association of Finland) KuPS
15	MF	Ivan Vicelich	3 September 1976 (age 50)	86	6	(New Zealand Football) Auckland City
16	FW	Jeremy Brockie	7 October 1987 (age 39)	36	0	(Canadian Soccer Association) Toronto
17	FW	Kosta Barbarouses	19 February 1990 (age 36)	22	2	(Football Australia) Melbourne Victory
18	MF	Tim Payne	10 January 1994 (age 32)	9	2	(The Football Association) Blackburn Rovers
19	FW	Kris Bright	5 September 1986 (age 40)	4	1	(Football Association of Finland) Mariehamn
20	FW	Chris Wood	7 December 1991 (age 34)	30	10	(The Football Association) Leicester City
21	MF	Cameron Howieson	22 December 1994 (age 31)	4	0	(The Football Association) Burnley
22	DF	Andrew Durante	3 May 1982 (age 44)	1	0	(New Zealand Football) Wellington Phoenix

== Saudi Arabia ==
Head coach: (Spain) Juan Ramón López Caro

No.	Pos.	Player	Date of birth (age)	Caps	Goals	Club
1	GK	Waleed Abdullah	19 April 1986 (age 40)	45	0	(Saudi Arabian Football Federation) Al-Shabab
2	DF	Mansoor Al-Harbi	7 April 1987 (age 39)	10	1	(Saudi Arabian Football Federation) Al-Ahli
3	DF	Osama Hawsawi	31 March 1984 (age 42)	57	5	(Saudi Arabian Football Federation) Al-Ahli
4	DF	Ahmed Assiri	14 November 1991 (age 35)	2	0	(Saudi Arabian Football Federation) Al-Ittihad
5	DF	Omar Hawsawi	27 September 1986 (age 40)	0	0	(Saudi Arabian Football Federation) Al-Nasr
6	MF	Abdullah Otayf	3 August 1992 (age 34)	3	1	(Saudi Arabian Football Federation) Al-Hilal
7	DF	Kamel Al-Mousa	29 August 1982 (age 44)	27	0	(Saudi Arabian Football Federation) Al-Ahli
8	MF	Yahya Al-Shehri	8 May 1991 (age 35)	12	0	(Saudi Arabian Football Federation) Al-Ettifaq
9	FW	Naif Hazazi	11 January 1989 (age 37)	29	10	(Saudi Arabian Football Federation) Al-Ittihad
10	FW	Fahad Al-Muwallad	14 September 1994 (age 32)	6	2	(Saudi Arabian Football Federation) Al-Ittihad
11	FW	Nasser Al-Shamrani	23 November 1983 (age 42)	40	13	(Saudi Arabian Football Federation) Al-Hilal
13	DF	Sultan Al-Bishi	28 January 1990 (age 36)	6	0	(Saudi Arabian Football Federation) Al-Hilal
14	MF	Saud Kariri (c)	8 June 1980 (age 46)	88	4	(Saudi Arabian Football Federation) Al-Ittihad
15	MF	Salman Al-Faraj	1 August 1989 (age 37)	2	0	(Saudi Arabian Football Federation) Al-Hilal
16	MF	Housain Al-Mogahwi	29 January 1988 (age 38)	4	0	(Saudi Arabian Football Federation) Al-Fateh
17	MF	Taisir Al-Jassim	25 July 1984 (age 42)	61	7	(Saudi Arabian Football Federation) Al-Ahli
18	MF	Mustafa Al-Bassas	2 June 1993 (age 33)	1	0	(Saudi Arabian Football Federation) Al-Ahli
19	DF	Yasser Al-Shahrani	26 May 1992 (age 34)	3	0	(Saudi Arabian Football Federation) Al-Hilal
20	FW	Yousef Al-Salem	4 May 1985 (age 41)	6	1	(Saudi Arabian Football Federation) Al-Hilal
22	GK	Abdullah Al-Sudairy	2 February 1992 (age 34)	0	0	(Saudi Arabian Football Federation) Al-Hilal
23	DF	Ali Al-Zubaidi	4 January 1993 (age 33)	3	0	(Saudi Arabian Football Federation) Al-Ittifaq

== Trinidad and Tobago ==
Head coach: Stephen Hart

No.	Pos.	Player	Date of birth (age)	Caps	Goals	Club
	GK	Jan-Michael Williams	26 October 1984 (age 42)	53	0	(Trinidad and Tobago Football Association) Central FC
	GK	Marvin Phillip	1 August 1984 (age 42)	40	0	(Trinidad and Tobago Football Association) W Connection
	GK	Glenroy Samuel	5 April 1990 (age 36)	0	0	(Trinidad and Tobago Football Association) Caledonia AIA
	DF	Sheldon Bateau	29 January 1991 (age 35)	1	0	(Royal Belgian Football Association) KV Mechelen
	DF	Justin Hoyte	20 November 1984 (age 41)	4	0	(The Football Association) Middlesbrough
	DF	Robert Primus	10 November 1990 (age 36)	5	0	(Kazakhstan Football Federation) FC Aktobe
	DF	Mekeil Williams	24 July 1990 (age 36)	1	1	(Trinidad and Tobago Football Association) W Connection
	DF	Aubrey David	11 October 1990 (age 36)	8	1	(Trinidad and Tobago Football Association) Caledonia AIA
	DF	Radanfah Abu Bakr	12 February 1987 (age 39)	12	1	(Kazakhstan Football Federation) FC Vostok
	DF	Daneil Cyrus	15 December 1990 (age 35)	30	0	(Trinidad and Tobago Football Association) W Connection
	DF	Curtis González	26 January 1989 (age 37)	11	0	(Trinidad and Tobago Football Association) Defence Force
	MF	Khaleem Hyland	5 June 1989 (age 37)	34	3	(Royal Belgian Football Association) Racing Genk
	MF	Kevan George	30 January 1990 (age 36)	0	0	(United States Soccer Federation) Columbus Crew
	MF	Kevin Molino	17 June 1990 (age 36)	19	4	(United States Soccer Federation) Orlando City
	MF	Densill Theobald	27 June 1982 (age 44)	95	2	(Trinidad and Tobago Football Association) Caledonia AIA
	MF	Marcus Joseph	29 April 1991 (age 35)	2	0	(Trinidad and Tobago Football Association) Point Fortin Civic F.C.
	MF	Ataullah Guerra	14 November 1987 (age 39)	21	2	(Football Association of Finland) RoPS
	MF	Andre Boucaud	10 October 1984 (age 42)	10	0	(The Football Association) Notts County
	FW	Kenwyne Jones	5 October 1984 (age 42)	56	9	(The Football Association) Stoke City
	FW	Lester Peltier	13 September 1988 (age 38)	17	5	(Slovak Football Association) Slovan Bratislava
	FW	Willis Plaza	3 August 1987 (age 39)	7	4	(Vietnam Football Federation) Sông Lam Nghệ An

== United Arab Emirates ==
Head coach: Mahdi Ali

== Player representation ==
=== By club nationality ===
Players	Countries

Nations in italics are not represented by their national teams in the finals.

=== By representatives of domestic league ===
National Squad	No.
[[ national football team|]]	
[[ national football team|]]	
