= United Arab Emirates national football team =

Men's association football team

United Arab Emirates
- Nickname(s): Al-Abyad (The White Jersey); Eyal Zayed (Sons of Zayed)
- Association: United Arab Emirates Football Association (UAE FA)
- Other affiliation: United Arab Emirates Pro League (UAE PL)
- Confederation: AFC (Asia)
- Sub-confederation: WAFF (West Asia)
- Head coach: Zlatko Dalić
- Captain: Khalid Eisa
- Most caps: Adnan Al Talyani (161)
- Top scorer: Ali Mabkhout (85)
- Home stadium: Zayed Sports City Stadium (Home); Various
- FIFA code: UAE
| First colours | Second colours |

FIFA ranking
- Current: 66 ▼1 (18 November 2026)
- Highest: 40 (November – December 1998)
- Lowest: 138 (January 2012)

First international
- United Arab Emirates 1–0 Qatar (Riyadh, Saudi Arabia; 17 March 1972)

Biggest win
- Brunei 0–12 United Arab Emirates (Bandar Seri Begawan, Brunei; 14 April 2001)

Biggest defeat
- United Arab Emirates 0–8 Brazil (Abu Dhabi, United Arab Emirates; 12 November 2005)

World Cup
- Appearances: 1 (first in 1990)
- Best result: Group stage (1990)

Asian Cup
- Appearances: 12 (first in 1980)
- Best result: Runners-up (1996)

Arabian Gulf Cup
- Appearances: 24 (first in 1972)
- Best result: Champions (2007, 2013)

Confederations Cup
- Appearances: 1 (first in 1997)
- Best result: Group stage (1997)

FIFA U-20 World Cup
- Appearances: 3 (first in 1997)
- Best result: Quarter-finals (2003, 2009)

FIFA U-17 World Cup
- Appearances: 4 (first in 1991)
- Best result: Round of 16 (2009)

Arab Cup
- Appearances: 3 (first in 1998)
- Best result: Third place (2025)
Medal record
Men's football
AFC Asian Cup
| Silver medal – second place | 1996 UAE | Team |
| Bronze medal – third place | 2015 Australia | Team |
Asian Games
| Silver medal – second place | 2010 China | Team |
| Bronze medal – third place | 2018 Indonesia | Team |
FIFA Arab Cup
| Bronze medal – third place | 2025 Qatar | Team |
Arabian Gulf Cup
| Gold medal – first place | 2007 UAE | Team |
| Gold medal – first place | 2013 Bahrain | Team |
| Silver medal – second place | 1986 Bahrain | Team |
| Silver medal – second place | 1988 Saudi Arabia | Team |
| Silver medal – second place | 1994 UAE | Team |
| Silver medal – second place | 2017 Kuwait | Team |
| Bronze medal – third place | 1972 Saudi Arabia | Team |
| Bronze medal – third place | 1982 UAE | Team |
| Bronze medal – third place | 1998 Kuwait | Team |
| Bronze medal – third place | 2014 Saudi Arabia | Team |
International Arab Friendly Tournament
| Silver medal – second place | 2005 Switzerland | Team |

The United Arab Emirates national football team (Arabic: منتخب الإمَارَاتُ الْعَرَبِيَّةُ الْمُتَّحِدَة لِكُرَّةُ الْقَدَم) represents United Arab Emirates in men's international football and serves under the auspices of the country's Football Association.

It has made one FIFA World Cup appearance in 1990 in Italy and lost all three of its games. United Arab Emirates took fourth place in the 1992 AFC Asian Cup and runner-up in 1996 as host. It won the Arabian Gulf Cup in 2007 and 2013. It finished third in the 2015 AFC Asian Cup and hosted the 2019 edition in which it was eliminated in the semi-finals.

== History ==
The first match of the team was played on 17 March 1972 against Qatar at Prince Faisal bin Fahd Stadium and won with the only goal scored by Ahmed Chowbi. Then, the team faced three other Arabian countries, losing 4–0 and 7–0 to Saudi Arabia and Kuwait respectively and beating Bahrain 3 to nothing. After participating in four Gulf Cup tournaments since 1972, United Arab Emirates (UAE) hosted the 1982 edition. It again finished third as did in the two previous tournaments.

In 1980, United Arab Emirates first-time qualified for the AFC Asian Cup which was held in Kuwait and were drawn with eventual winners, Kuwait, runner-up South Korea, Malaysia and Qatar in Group B. It drew 1–1 with Kuwait and lost the three other matches and finished in fifth place in the group and ninth (out of ten teams) overall. It also qualified for the next two tournaments, 1984 in Singapore and 1988 in Qatar and was again eliminated in the group stages in both. Its first victory of the tournament occurred against India on 7 December 1984, under manager Heshmat Mohajerani.

In 1984, Mohajerani resigned and was replaced with Carlos Alberto Parreira. Parreira led the team at the 1988 Asian Cup and left his position after the tournament. He was succeeded by Mário Zagallo. Zagallo led the team to the qualification for the 1990 FIFA World Cup in Italy. However, Zagallo resigned before the tournament and Parreira returned. The team finished fourth at the 1990 World Cup's final tournament with no points, scoring two goals and conceding 11 goals. The journey was put into a 2016 documentary titled Lights of Rome. After the tournament, Parreira was sacked.

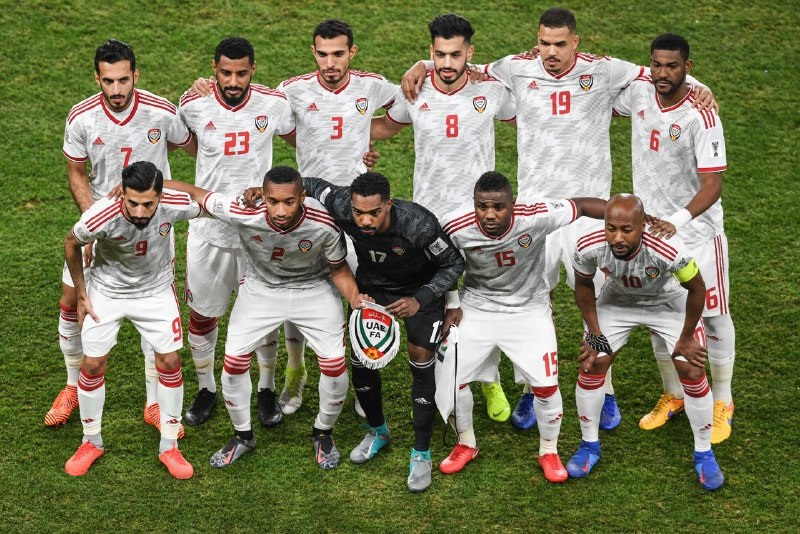
UAE players before playing against Australia in the quarter-finals of the 2019 AFC Asian Cup

At the 1992 and 1996 AFC Asian Cups, United Arab Emirates finished fourth and runners-up respectively for the first times. United Arab Emirates appeared in the 1997 FIFA Confederations Cup after being awarded a spot because Saudi Arabia was hosting the games.

United Arab Emirates missed the qualification for the 2000 AFC Asian Cup in Lebanon and finished in last place at the 2002 Arabian Gulf Cup in Saudi Arabia. It was eliminated in the next three Asian Cup tournaments at the group stage. In 2004 and 2007 editions, UAE was all eliminated by the hand to debutants Jordan and Vietnam. In 2011, it finished the tournament goalless. At this time, United Arab Emirates appointed world class coaches like Carlos Queiroz, Roy Hodgson and Dick Advocaat. In 2006, UAE appointed Bruno Metsu as the new manager. He led the Emirates to carry the 2007 Arabian Gulf Cup title.

After hiring foreign coaches, in 2012, United Arab Emirates appointed the Olympic team coach Mahdi Ali as the manager of the senior team. Ali began creating a squad inviting players that he had worked with at the youth level. He led the Emirates to their second Arabian Gulf Cup title in 2013.

At the 2015 AFC Asian Cup, United Arab Emirates defeated Qatar 4–1 and Bahrain 2–1 but lost to Iran by a goal. As group runners-up, it faced the defending champions Japan in the quarter-final and earned a victory on penalties to advance to the last four. In the semi-finals, United Arab Emirates lost 2–0 to the host Australia. In the third-place play-off, United Arab Emirates defeated Iraq 3–2. United Arab Emirates qualified through the 2018 FIFA World Cup qualification where it finished fourth in Group B thus failing to qualify for the 2018 FIFA World Cup. Ahmed Khalil was a top scorer in the qualification. Around this time Mahdi Ali resigned from his position.

United Arab Emirates then hosted the 2019 AFC Asian Cup, this marked the second time they hosted an AFC Asian Cup. The team had Italian Alberto Zaccheroni as their coach. In the AFC Asian Cup tournament, UAE proceeded to the quarter-finals where it scored its first-ever goal against Australia to gain its first-ever win against this opponent. The semi-finals was between the host and Qatar. Some audiences threw footwear in the pitch after Qatar scored its second goal. UAE lost 0–4 marking its first defeat to Qatar since 2001.

United Arab Emirates joined the second round of 2022 FIFA World Cup qualifiers and was placed with all-out Southeast Asian opponents. The team had already appointed the Dutch guider Bert van Marwijk. Bert was sacked after his start undergoing two away losses to Thailand and Vietnam in the qualifiers along his group stage exit in the 24th Arabian Gulf Cup. After this, the Emirates decided to naturalize Argentine Sebastián Tagliabúe, Brazilian Caio Canedo Corrêa and Fábio Virginio de Lima, the three South American players, having never done so since the foundation of the national team. The team then experienced a period of coaching instabilities, with three different coaches, before van Marwijk resumed his duty due to crisis in option. With the COVID-19 pandemic however, the AFC decided the remaining games of the second round would be played in one country, and with the UAE chosen to host Group G, they were able to utilize the home-field advantage as the host nation, ultimately u-turned the earlier misery into four consecutive wins to break through into the third round, where they faced its neighbours and the powerhouses Iran and South Korea. In the third round, the UAE failed to produce a promising performance after winning just one out of six first games, a 1–0 away win over Lebanon, drew three and lost two, adding with the UAE's below average performance in the 2021 FIFA Arab Cup despite reaching the quarter-finals, that was enough to sack the Dutch manager van Marwijk yet again. After inconsistency in performance, the UAE appointed Argentine manager Rodolfo Arruabarrena as coach, and the team's result improved, winning two out of four games, notably an impressive 1–0 home win over already-qualified South Korea, to reach the fourth round, increased hope for the country to qualify for the first-ever World Cup since 1990, where they would face the old foe Australia, whom the UAE defeated in the latest meeting. However, the UAE was unable to utilise their geographical advantage in the playoff in neighbouring Qatar, losing 1–2 to Australia by a thunderous strike at 84' by Ajdin Hrustic and by mistake of Ali Salmeen to deny the UAE's its potential second appearance; they later stunned South America's rising power Peru to qualify for the edition.

== Rivalries ==
UAE's common rivals are Saudi Arabia, Qatar, Oman, and Iran.

=== Qatar ===
The rivalry with Qatar is a competitive one in the Arabian Gulf Cup meeting on multiple occasions. Due to the Qatar diplomatic crisis, increasing tensions had been witnessed, with the captain of UAE under-19 youth team refused to shake hands with Qatar's youth captain in 2018 AFC U-19 Championship held in Indonesia; in this tournament, the UAE beat Qatar 2–1 but still crashed out from the group stage while Qatar would recover to qualify for the 2019 FIFA U-20 World Cup. As of 2020, Qatar and UAE have played 31 official matches, most of which was held competitively in the Arabian Gulf Cup, it started off with the United Arab Emirates beating Qatar 1–0. They only played 2 friendly games and the last friendly was held in 2011 which ended with an Emirati victory.

In the 2019 AFC Asian Cup, hosted by the UAE, Qatar overran the UAE for the first time since 2001 with the result 4–0, with heavy tensions and violence occurred between two and Emirati supporters cheering anti-Qatari chants. In the year prior to the 2026 World Cup qualification fourth round, the UAE achieved notable victories over Qatar, demonstrating a shift in momentum in their rivalry. On 5 September 2024, the UAE defeated Qatar 3–1 in Doha during the third round of World Cup qualifiers, overturning an early goal by Qatar to secure a comeback win with goals from Harib Suhail, Khalid Al Dhanhani, and Ali Saleh. Later, on 19 November 2024, the UAE delivered a historic 5–0 victory against Qatar in Abu Dhabi, marking their largest win over Qatar in history. Fabio Lima starred in the match with four goals, complemented by Yahya Al Ghassani's strike, showcasing a dominant performance that boosted the UAE's standing in the qualification group.

During the 2026 FIFA World Cup qualification fourth round fixture between the two nations, riots broke out as Emirati fans invaded the pitch while throwing plastic bottles and footwear, as a result of a clear refereeing injustice throughout the match, after Qatar scored a goal. With Sultan Adel scoring late for the UAE, Qatar would win the match 2–1 and secure a qualification to the 2026 FIFA World Cup while the UAE would qualify for the fifth round instead. The match also sparked significant controversy regarding the officiating, as the decisive match was stopped 92 times with numerous decisions by the referee and the match's time wasting, which the actual playing time was 48 minutes out of 109, were widely criticized by Emirati fans, analysts, and media outlets. Observers highlighted several instances where fouls and potential penalty situations in favor of the UAE were not awarded, including a crucial corner kick that was ignored. Conversely, minor infractions by UAE players were frequently called as fouls, and several yellow cards were issued without clear justification. Additionally, physical challenges and aggressive behavior by Qatari players against Emirati players were perceived to go unpunished, further fueling claims of biased officiating. Critics also questioned the neutrality of the venue, noting that the match was played in conditions perceived as favoring Qatar. The cumulative effect of these issues, along with the inconsistent management of added time, led to heightened tensions among fans and ultimately contributed to the pitch invasions and violent reactions following Qatar's goals. While no formal protest was lodged with FIFA or the AFC, the perceived lack of fairness became a central talking point in the aftermath of the game.

=== Saudi Arabia ===
Another major rival the UAE takes on Arabian Gulf Cup many times, the two teams have met in the AFC Asian Cup twice, first in the semi-finals of the 1992 edition which ended in a Saudi victory and second in the final of the 1996 edition in which UAE hosted, the game ended in a goalless draw which meant the game had to be decided in penalties, the game ended with Saudi Arabia taking home their 3rd title with the penalty scoreline being 4–2, this remains the only time the Emirates qualified for the final meanwhile this would also be the last time the Saudis would win an Asian Cup as they would lose the next two finals they qualified for in 2000 and 2007. When the countries meet in qualifier matches, the matchup has been nicknamed "clash of titans" as both countries have been some of the more successful teams in the Arabian Peninsula.

== Team image ==
=== Kit ===
The UAE's traditional home kit is all-white with some red trim while their away kit is all-red with some white trim, in 2019, the away colors were black for the first time in addition, there were some green trim.

| Manufacturer | Period |
|---|---|
| (United Kingdom) Umbro | 1979–1985 |
| (United Kingdom) Admiral | 1986–1989 |
| (Germany) Adidas | 1990–1994 |
| (Germany) Puma | 1995–1996 |
| (Spain) Kelme | 1997–1999 |
| (Germany) Adidas | 2000–2001 |
| (United Kingdom) Umbro | 2002–2005 |
| (Germany) Adidas | 2006–2008 |
| (Italy) Erreà | 2009–2013 |
| (Germany) Adidas | 2014–present |

=== Nickname ===
The United Arab Emirates is known by supporters and the media as Al-Abyad, meaning The Whites which reference to their white jersey and also Eyal Zayed which means Zayed's sons.

In October 2012, the Asian Football Confederation official website published an article about the UAE national team's campaign to qualify for the 2015 AFC Asian Cup, in which the team was referred to using the racial slur "sand monkey". This was the indirect result of vandalism of the Wikipedia article on the team, and the AFC was forced to apologise.

=== Home stadium ===
As of 2025, UAE has played in 12 home stadiums. Most games have taken place at Zayed Sports City Stadium in Abu Dhabi with Abu Dhabi's Al Jazira Stadium and Hazza Bin Zayed Stadium in Al Ain as other venues.

Home stadiums list
| Image | Stadium | Capacity | Location | Last match |
|---|---|---|---|---|
| | Zayed Sports City Stadium | 43,206 | Abu Dhabi, Abu Dhabi | v Kyrgyzstan (21 January 2019; 2019 AFC Asian Cup) |
| | Mohammed bin Zayed Stadium | 42,056 | Abu Dhabi, Abu Dhabi | v Iraq (13 November 2025; 2026 FIFA World Cup qualification) |
| | Al Nahyan Stadium | 12,201 | Abu Dhabi, Abu Dhabi | v Uzbekistan (5 June 2025; 2026 FIFA World Cup qualification) |
| | Hazza bin Zayed Stadium | 25,053 | Al Ain, Abu Dhabi | v North Korea (10 October 2024; 2026 FIFA World Cup qualification) |
| | Tahnoun bin Mohammed Stadium | 15,000 | Al Ain, Abu Dhabi | v Kuwait (2 September 2011; 2014 FIFA World Cup qualification) |
| | Sheikh Khalifa International Stadium | 12,000 | Al Ain, Abu Dhabi | v Australia (5 January 2011; Friendly) |
| | Zabeel Stadium | 8,439 | Dubai, Dubai | v Bahrain (8 September 2025; Friendly) |
| | Maktoum bin Rashid Al Maktoum Stadium | 12,000 | Dubai, Dubai | v Bolivia (16 November 2018; Friendly) |
| | Al Maktoum Stadium | 15,058 | Dubai, Dubai | v Nepal (16 November 2023; 2026 FIFA World Cup qualification) |
| | Rashid Stadium | 12,000 | Dubai, Dubai | v Jordan (24 May 2021; Friendly) |
| | Al Awir Stadium | 10,000 | Al Awir, Dubai | v Uzbekistan (14 October 2014; Friendly) |
| | Sharjah Stadium | 18,000 | Sharjah, Sharjah | v Uzbekistan (28 January 2009; 2011 AFC Asian Cup qualification) |

== Results and fixtures ==
The following is a list of match results in the last 12 months, as well as any future matches that have been scheduled.

Win Draw Loss Fixture

=== 2025 ===
| 4 September 2025 Friendly | United Arab Emirates | 3–1 | Syria | Dubai, United Arab Emirates |
| 20:00 UTC+4 | Ivković 62'; Al-Ghassani 78' (pen.); Gastón Suárez 86' | Report | Al Salkhadi 36' | Stadium: Zabeel Stadium |

| 8 September 2025 Friendly | United Arab Emirates | 1–0 | Bahrain | Dubai, United Arab Emirates |
| 21:15 UTC+4 | Luanzinho 24' | Report | | Stadium: Zabeel Stadium |

| 11 October 2025 2026 FIFA World Cup qualification | United Arab Emirates | 2–1 | Oman | Al Rayyan, Qatar |
| 19:00 UTC+3 | Meloni 76'; Caio 83' | Report | Autonne 12' (o.g.) | Stadium: Jassim bin Hamad Stadium; Attendance: 8,817; Referee: Alireza Faghani (Australia) |

| 14 October 2025 2026 FIFA World Cup qualification | Qatar | 2–1 | United Arab Emirates | Al Rayyan, Qatar |
| 19:00 UTC+3 | Khoukhi 49'; Pedro Miguel 74' | Report | Adil 90+8' | Stadium: Jassim bin Hamad Stadium; Attendance: 13,038; Referee: Ilgiz Tantashev (Uzbekistan) |

| 13 November 2025 2026 FIFA World Cup qualification | United Arab Emirates | 1–1 | Iraq | Abu Dhabi, United Arab Emirates |
| 20:00 UTC+4 | Luanzinho 18' | Report | Al-Hamadi 10' | Stadium: Mohammed bin Zayed Stadium; Attendance: 32,008; Referee: Shaun Evans (Australia) |

| 18 November 2025 2026 FIFA World Cup qualification | Iraq | 2–1 | United Arab Emirates | Basra, Iraq |
| 19:00 UTC+3 | Ali 66'; Al-Ammari 90+17' (pen.) | Report | Caio Lucas 52' | Stadium: Basra International Stadium; Attendance: 62,444; Referee: Yusuke Araki (Japan) |

| 3 December 2025 2025 FIFA Arab Cup | Jordan | 2–1 | United Arab Emirates | Al Khor, Qatar |
| 20:00 UTC+3 | Olwan 20' (pen.); Al-Naimat 63' | Report | Bruno 47' | Stadium: Al Bayt Stadium; Attendance: 30,759; Referee: Ahmed Al-Kaf (Oman) |

| 6 December 2025 2025 FIFA Arab Cup | United Arab Emirates | 1–1 | Egypt | Lusail, Qatar |
| 21:30 UTC+3 | Lucas 60' | Report | Hamdy 85' | Stadium: Lusail Stadium; Attendance: 36,299; Referee: Glenn Nyberg (Sweden) |

| 9 December 2025 2025 FIFA Arab Cup | United Arab Emirates | 3–1 | Kuwait | Doha, Qatar |
| 17:30 UTC+3 | Al-Ghassani 16' (pen.), 18'; Giménez 66' | Report | Al Hajeri 59' | Stadium: Stadium 974; Attendance: 15,357; Referee: Ma Ning (China) |

| 12 December 2025 2025 FIFA Arab Cup | Algeria | 1–1 (a.e.t.) (6–7 p) | United Arab Emirates | Al Khor, Qatar |
| 20:30 UTC+3 | Boulbina 46' | Report | Bruno 64' | Stadium: Al Bayt Stadium; Attendance: 50,424; Referee: Adham Makhadmeh (Jordan) |
| | Penalties |
| | Brahimi (penalty scored); Benzia (penalty missed); Mrezigue (penalty scored); Ounas (penalty scored); Boulbina (penalty scored); Halaïmia (penalty scored); Draoui (penalty scored); Khacef (penalty missed) | | (penalty scored) Lucas; (penalty missed) Meloni; (penalty scored) Saleh; (penalty scored) Pimenta; (penalty scored) Faiz; (penalty scored) Adil; (penalty scored) Autonne; (penalty scored) Akonnor |

| 15 December 2025 2025 FIFA Arab Cup | Morocco | 3–0 | United Arab Emirates | Al Rayyan, Qatar |
| 17:30 UTC+3 | El Berkaoui 28'; El Mahdioui 83'; Hamadallah 90+2' | Report | | Stadium: Khalifa International Stadium; Attendance: 33,898; Referee: Espen Eskås (Norway) |

| 18 December 2025 2025 FIFA Arab Cup | Saudi Arabia | Abandoned | United Arab Emirates | Al Rayyan, Qatar |
| 14:00 UTC+3 | | Report | | Stadium: Khalifa International Stadium; Referee: Cristián Garay (Chile) |
Note: Match was abandoned at halftime (when the score was 0–0) due to heavy rainfall.

=== 2026 ===
| 24 September 2026 Gulf Cup GS | United Arab Emirates | v | Yemen | Jeddah, Saudi Arabia |
| --:-- UTC+3 | | | | Stadium: TBD |

| 27 September 2026 Gulf Cup GS | Bahrain | v | United Arab Emirates | Jeddah, Saudi Arabia |
| --:-- UTC+3 | | | | Stadium: TBD |

| 30 September 2026 Gulf Cup GS | United Arab Emirates | v | Qatar | Jeddah, Saudi Arabia |
| --:-- UTC+3 | | | | Stadium: TBD |

=== 2027 ===
| 10 January 2027 Asian Cup GS | United Arab Emirates | v | Vietnam | Riyadh, Saudi Arabia |
| --:-- | | | | Stadium: King Saud University Stadium |

| 15 January 2027 Asian Cup GS | Yemen | v | United Arab Emirates | Riyadh, Saudi Arabia |
| --:-- | | | | Stadium: King Fahd Sports City Stadium |

| 20 January 2027 Asian Cup GS | South Korea | v | United Arab Emirates | Riyadh, Saudi Arabia |
| --:-- | | | | Stadium: King Saud University Stadium |

== Current staff ==
Last Update: 12 August 2026

| Position | Name |
|---|---|
| Head coach | (Croatia) Zlatko Dalić |
| Assistant coach | Vacant |
| Goalkeeping coach | Vacant |
| Fitness coach | (Brazil) Leandro Alub |
| Scouting | (Brazil) Ferdinando Montebello |
| Team administrator | (United Arab Emirates) Mohamed Albalooshi |
| Media coordinator | (United Arab Emirates) Salim Alnaqbi |
| Doctor | (Brazil) Flavio Cruz |
| Interpreter | (United Arab Emirates) Hussein Fakih |
| Match Analyst | (Canada) Karim Tayara |

== Players ==
=== Current squad ===
The following 24 players were called up to the internal training camp in Abu Dhabi from March 23 to 30, 2026 by coach Cosmin Olăroiu.
Caps and goals correct as of 15 December 2025, after the match against Morocco.

| No. | Pos. | Player | Date of birth (age) | Caps | Goals | Club |
|---|---|---|---|---|---|---|
| 1 | GK | Ali Khasif (captain) | 9 June 1987 (age 39) | 74 | 0 | (United Arab Emirates Football Association) Al Jazira |
| 17 | GK | Adel Al-Hosani | 23 August 1989 (age 37) | 1 | 0 | (United Arab Emirates Football Association) Sharjah |
| 22 | GK | Hamad Al-Meqbaali | 13 July 2003 (age 23) | 6 | 0 | (United Arab Emirates Football Association) Shabab Al Ahli |
| 2 | DF | Mohammed Rabii | 29 September 2001 (age 25) | 1 | 0 | (United Arab Emirates Football Association) Al Jazira |
| 3 | DF | Leonard Amisemeku | 25 November 2003 (age 22) | 0 | 0 | (United Arab Emirates Football Association) Al Dhafra |
| 4 | DF | Gláuber | 24 July 2000 (age 26) | 0 | 0 | (United Arab Emirates Football Association) Al Nasr |
| 5 | DF | Saša Ivković | 13 May 1993 (age 33) | 8 | 1 | (United Arab Emirates Football Association) Al Wahda |
| 12 | DF | Khalifa Al Hammadi | 7 November 1998 (age 28) | 54 | 2 | (United Arab Emirates Football Association) Al Jazira |
| 13 | DF | Bader Nasser | 16 September 2001 (age 25) | 14 | 0 | (United Arab Emirates Football Association) Al Wahda |
| 18 | DF | Richard Akonnor | 6 February 2004 (age 22) | 3 | 0 | (United Arab Emirates Football Association) Al Jazira |
| 6 | MF | Mohammed Abbas | 30 September 2002 (age 24) | 9 | 0 | (United Arab Emirates Football Association) Al Ain |
| 7 | MF | Ali Saleh | 22 January 2000 (age 26) | 54 | 6 | (United Arab Emirates Football Association) Al Wasl |
| 8 | MF | Nicolás Giménez | 16 January 1996 (age 30) | 12 | 1 | (United Arab Emirates Football Association) Al Wasl |
| 9 | MF | Harib Abdalla | 26 November 2002 (age 23) | 45 | 8 | (United Arab Emirates Football Association) Sharjah |
| 24 | MF | Mamadou Coulibaly | 3 June 2003 (age 23) | 0 | 0 | (United Arab Emirates Football Association) Al Jazira |
| 14 | MF | Abdulla Hamad | 18 September 2001 (age 25) | 13 | 0 | (United Arab Emirates Football Association) Al Wahda |
| 15 | MF | Yahia Nader | 11 September 1998 (age 28) | 30 | 0 | (United Arab Emirates Football Association) Baniyas |
| 20 | MF | Guilherme Bala | 16 September 2001 (age 25) | 0 | 0 | (United Arab Emirates Football Association) Shabab Al Ahli |
| 21 | MF | Isam Faiz | 6 March 2000 (age 26) | 13 | 0 | (United Arab Emirates Football Association) Al Nasr |
| 23 | MF | Suhail Al-Noubi | 9 January 1996 (age 30) | 1 | 0 | (United Arab Emirates Football Association) Baniyas |
| 26 | FW | Ousmane Camara | 23 January 2001 (age 25) | 0 | 0 | (United Arab Emirates Football Association) Sharjah |
| 16 | FW | Bruno | 10 June 2001 (age 25) | 17 | 2 | (United Arab Emirates Football Association) Al Jazira |
| 19 | FW | Yuri César | 6 May 2000 (age 26) | 0 | 0 | (United Arab Emirates Football Association) Shabab Al Ahli |

=== Recent call-ups ===
The following players have also been called up to the squad within the last 12 months.

| Pos. | Player | Date of birth (age) | Caps | Goals | Club | Latest call-up |
|---|---|---|---|---|---|---|
| GK | Khalid Eisa | 15 September 1989 (age 37) | 94 | 0 | (United Arab Emirates) Al Ain | v. Iraq, 18 November 2025 |
| GK | Fahad Al-Dhanhani | 3 September 1991 (age 35) | 2 | 0 | (United Arab Emirates) Baniyas | v. Qatar, 14 October 2025 |
| DF | Kouame Autonne | 22 September 2000 (age 26) | 17 | 0 | (United Arab Emirates) United | v. Saudi Arabia, 18 December 2025 |
| DF | Lucas Pimenta | 17 July 2000 (age 26) | 16 | 0 | (United Arab Emirates) Al Wahda | v. Saudi Arabia, 18 December 2025 |
| DF | Ala Zhir | 7 March 2000 (age 26) | 6 | 0 | (United Arab Emirates) Al Wahda | v. Saudi Arabia, 18 December 2025 |
| DF | Khaled Ibrahim | 17 January 1997 (age 29) | 27 | 1 | (United Arab Emirates) Sharjah | v. Saudi Arabia, 18 December 2025 |
| DF | Rúben Canedo | 19 October 2001 (age 25) | 11 | 0 | (United Arab Emirates) Al Wahda | v. Saudi Arabia, 18 December 2025 |
| DF | Marcus Meloni | 25 June 2000 (age 26) | 20 | 2 | (United Arab Emirates) Al Jazira | v. Saudi Arabia, 18 December 2025 |
| DF | Erik | 18 February 2001 (age 25) | 3 | 0 | (United Arab Emirates) Al Ain | v. Qatar, 14 October 2025 |
| DF | Zayed Sultan | 11 April 2001 (age 25) | 16 | 1 | (United Arab Emirates) Al Nasr | v. Oman, 11 October 2025 ^{PRE} |
| MF | Yahya Al-Ghassani | 18 April 1998 (age 28) | 40 | 12 | (United Arab Emirates) Shabab Al Ahli | v. Saudi Arabia, 18 December 2025 |
| MF | Luanzinho | 21 April 2000 (age 26) | 9 | 2 | (United Arab Emirates) Sharjah | v. Saudi Arabia, 18 December 2025 |
| MF | Majid Rashid | 16 May 2000 (age 26) | 23 | 0 | (United Arab Emirates) Sharjah | v. Saudi Arabia, 18 December 2025 |
| MF | Abdullah Ramadan | 7 March 1998 (age 28) | 53 | 1 | (United Arab Emirates) Al Jazira | v. Iraq, 18 November 2025 |
| MF | Gastón Suárez | 5 April 1993 (age 33) | 2 | 1 | (United Arab Emirates) Al Wahda | v. Iraq, 18 November 2025 |
| MF | Gustavo Alemão | 23 March 2000 (age 26) | 0 | 0 | (United Arab Emirates) Al Nasr | v. Iraq, 18 November 2025 |
| MF | Majed Hassan | 1 August 1992 (age 34) | 70 | 1 | (United Arab Emirates) Sharjah | v. Qatar, 14 October 2025 |
| MF | Fábio Lima | 30 June 1993 (age 33) | 44 | 17 | (United Arab Emirates) Al Wasl | v. Qatar, 14 October 2025 |
| MF | Saile Souza | 19 September 2000 (age 26) | 0 | 0 | (United Arab Emirates) Kalba | v. Qatar, 14 October 2025 |
| MF | Mackenzie Hunt | 14 November 2001 (age 25) | 9 | 0 | (United Arab Emirates) Baniyas | v. Oman, 11 October 2025 |
| MF | Mohammed Abdulbasit | 19 October 1995 (age 31) | 8 | 0 | (United Arab Emirates) Al Nasr | v. Oman, 11 October 2025 |
| FW | Caio Lucas | 19 April 1994 (age 32) | 13 | 4 | (United Arab Emirates) Sharjah | v. Saudi Arabia, 18 December 2025 |
| FW | Sultan Adil | 4 May 2004 (age 22) | 21 | 8 | (United Arab Emirates) Shabab Al Ahli | v. Saudi Arabia, 18 December 2025 |
| FW | Mohammed Juma | 30 May 2006 (age 20) | 2 | 0 | (United Arab Emirates) Shabab Al Ahli | v. Saudi Arabia, 18 December 2025 |
| FW | Caio Canedo | 9 August 1990 (age 36) | 60 | 10 | (United Arab Emirates) Al Wahda | v. Iraq, 18 November 2025 |
| FW | Mohamed Awad Alla | 16 July 2002 (age 24) | 1 | 0 | (United Arab Emirates) Baniyas | v. Iraq, 13 November 2025 ^{PRE} |
| FW | Álvaro | 27 May 2001 (age 25) | 3 | 0 | (United Arab Emirates) Al Bataeh | v. Oman, 11 October 2025 ^{PRE} |
^{SUS} Suspended^{INJ} Withdrew from the squad due to an injury^{PRE} Preliminary squad^{RET} Retired from international association football

=== List of UAE Squads ===
==== World Cup ====
- 1990 World Cup squad

==== Confederations Cup ====
- 1997 Confederations Cup squad

==== Asian Cup ====
- 1980 Asian Cup squad
- 1984 Asian Cup squad
- 1988 Asian Cup squad
- 1992 Asian Cup squad
- 1996 Asian Cup squad
- 2004 Asian Cup squad
- 2007 Asian Cup squad
- 2011 Asian Cup squad
- 2015 Asian Cup squad
- 2019 Asian Cup squad
- 2023 Asian Cup squad

==== Arab Cup ====
- 1998 Arab Cup squad
- 2021 FIFA Arab Cup squad
- 2025 FIFA Arab Cup squad

==== Arabian Gulf Cup ====
- 18th Arabian Gulf Cup squad
- 19th Arabian Gulf Cup squad
- 20th Arabian Gulf Cup squad
- 21st Arabian Gulf Cup squad
- 22nd Arabian Gulf Cup squad
- 23rd Arabian Gulf Cup squad
- 24th Arabian Gulf Cup squad
- 25th Arabian Gulf Cup squad
- 26th Arabian Gulf Cup squad

== Player records ==
As of 14 October 2025
Players in bold are still active with United Arab Emirates.

=== Most appearances ===
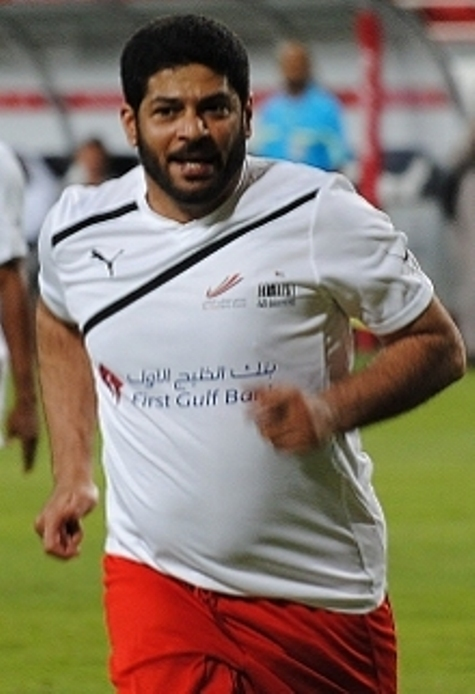
Adnan Al-Talyani is United Arab Emirates' most capped player with 161 appearances.

| Rank | Player | Caps | Goals | Career |
|---|---|---|---|---|
| 1 | Adnan Al-Talyani | 161 | 52 | 1983–1997 |
| 2 | Ismail Matar | 136 | 36 | 2003–2021 |
| 3 | Subait Khater | 120 | 11 | 1999–2011 |
| 4 | Ismail Al Hammadi | 116 | 13 | 2007–2019 |
| 4 | Abdulrahim Jumaa | 116 | 13 | 1998–2009 |
| 6 | Ali Mabkhout | 115 | 85 | 2009–2024 |
| 7 | Zuhair Bakheet | 112 | 27 | 1988–2002 |
| 7 | Abdulsalam Jumaa | 112 | 7 | 1997–2010 |
| 9 | Muhsin Musabah | 107 | 0 | 1988–1999 |
| 10 | Walid Abbas | 106 | 6 | 2008–2023 |

=== Top goalscorers ===
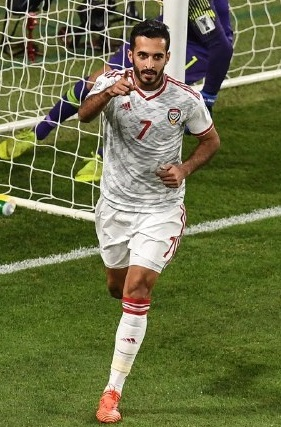
Ali Mabkhout is United Arab Emirates' top scorer with 85 goals.

| Rank | Player | Goals | Caps | Ratio | Career |
|---|---|---|---|---|---|
| 1 | Ali Mabkhout (list) | 85 | 115 | 0.74 | 2009–2024 |
| 2 | Adnan Al-Talyani | 52 | 161 | 0.32 | 1983–1997 |
| 3 | Ahmed Khalil | 48 | 104 | 0.46 | 2008–2019 |
| 4 | Ismail Matar | 36 | 136 | 0.26 | 2003–2021 |
| 5 | Fahad Khamees | 28 | 68 | 0.41 | 1981–1990 |
| 5 | Mohammad Omar | 28 | 102 | 0.27 | 1996–2009 |
| 7 | Zuhair Bakheet | 27 | 112 | 0.24 | 1988–2002 |
| 8 | **Fabio Lima** | 17 | 44 | 0.39 | 2020–present |
| 9 | Saeed Al Kass | 15 | 60 | 0.25 | 1998–2013 |
| 10 | Faisal Khalil | 13 | 61 | 0.21 | 2001–2010 |
| 10 | Ismail Al Hammadi | 13 | 116 | 0.11 | 2007–2019 |
| 10 | Abdulrahim Jumaa | 13 | 116 | 0.11 | 1998–2009 |

== Competitive record ==
Champion Runners-up Third place

Overview
| Event | 1st Place | 2nd Place | 3rd Place |
|---|---|---|---|
| AFC Asian Cup | 0 | 1 | 1 |
| Arabian Gulf Cup | 2 | 4 | 4 |
| Asian Games | 0 | 1 | 1 |
| Total | 2 | 6 | 6 |

=== FIFA World Cup ===
| FIFA World Cup record | | | | | | | | | Qualification record | | | | | |
| Year | Round | Position | Pld | W | D | L | GF | GA | Pld | W | D | L | GF | GA |
|---|---|---|---|---|---|---|---|---|---|---|---|---|---|---|
| 1930 to 1970 | Protectorate of the United Kingdom | | | | | | | | Protectorate of the United Kingdom | | | | | |
| (West Germany) 1974 | Not a FIFA member | | | | | | | | Not a FIFA member | | | | | |
| (Argentina) 1978 | Withdrew | | | | | | | | Withdrew | | | | | |
| (Spain) 1982 | Did not enter | | | | | | | | Did not enter | | | | | |
| (Mexico) 1986 | Did not qualify | | | | | | | | 4 | 2 | 1 | 1 | 5 | 4 |
| (Italy) 1990 | Group stage | 24th | 3 | 0 | 0 | 3 | 2 | 11 | 9 | 4 | 4 | 1 | 16 | 7 |
| (United States) 1994 | Did not qualify | | | | | | | | 8 | 6 | 1 | 1 | 19 | 4 |
| (France) 1998 | Did not qualify | | | | | | | | 12 | 5 | 4 | 3 | 16 | 13 |
| (South Korea) (Japan) 2002 | Did not qualify | | | | | | | | 16 | 7 | 2 | 7 | 31 | 20 |
| (Germany) 2006 | Did not qualify | | | | | | | | 6 | 3 | 1 | 2 | 6 | 6 |
| (South Africa) 2010 | Did not qualify | | | | | | | | 16 | 4 | 3 | 9 | 19 | 24 |
| (Brazil) 2014 | Did not qualify | | | | | | | | 8 | 2 | 1 | 5 | 14 | 16 |
| (Russia) 2018 | Did not qualify | | | | | | | | 18 | 9 | 3 | 6 | 37 | 17 |
| (Qatar) 2022 | Did not qualify | | | | | | | | 19 | 9 | 3 | 7 | 31 | 16 |
| (Canada) (Mexico) (United States) 2026 | Did not qualify | | | | | | | | 20 | 10 | 5 | 5 | 36 | 16 |
| (Morocco) (Portugal) (Spain) 2030 | TBD | | | | | | | | | | | | | |
| (Saudi Arabia) 2034 | TBD | | | | | | | | | | | | | |
| Total | Group stage | 1/12 | 3 | 0 | 0 | 3 | 2 | 11 | 136 | 61 | 28 | 47 | 230 | 143 |

United Arab Emirates's World Cup record
| First match | United Arab Emirates 0–2 Colombia (9 June 1990; Bologna, Italy) |
| Biggest Win | — |
| Biggest Defeat | West Germany 5–1 United Arab Emirates (15 June 1990; Milan, Italy) |
| Best Result | Group stage in 1990 |
| Worst Result | Group stage in 1990 |

=== AFC Asian Cup ===
| AFC Asian Cup record | | | | | | | | | Qualification record | | | | | |
| Year | Round | Position | Pld | W | D | L | GF | GA | Pld | W | D | L | GF | GA |
|---|---|---|---|---|---|---|---|---|---|---|---|---|---|---|
| (Hong Kong) 1956 to (Thailand) 1972 | Protectorate of the United Kingdom | | | | | | | | Protectorate of the United Kingdom | | | | | |
| (Iran) 1976 | Did not enter | | | | | | | | Did not enter | | | | | |
| (Kuwait) 1980 | Group stage | 9th | 4 | 0 | 1 | 3 | 3 | 9 | 3 | 1 | 2 | 0 | 2 | 0 |
| (Singapore) 1984 | Group stage | 6th | 4 | 2 | 0 | 2 | 3 | 8 | 4 | 3 | 0 | 1 | 24 | 2 |
| (Qatar) 1988 | Group stage | 8th | 4 | 1 | 0 | 3 | 2 | 4 | 5 | 4 | 1 | 0 | 12 | 1 |
| (Japan) 1992 | Fourth place | 4th | 5 | 1 | 3 | 1 | 3 | 4 | 2 | 2 | 0 | 0 | 6 | 3 |
| (United Arab Emirates) 1996 | Runners-up | 2nd | 6 | 4 | 2 | 0 | 8 | 3 | Qualified as hosts | | | | | |
| (Lebanon) 2000 | Did not qualify | | | | | | | | 4 | 3 | 0 | 1 | 12 | 2 |
| (China) 2004 | Group stage | 15th | 3 | 0 | 1 | 2 | 1 | 5 | 6 | 4 | 1 | 1 | 13 | 5 |
| (Indonesia) (Malaysia) (Thailand) (Vietnam) 2007 | Group stage | 12th | 3 | 1 | 0 | 2 | 3 | 6 | 6 | 4 | 1 | 1 | 11 | 6 |
| (Qatar) 2011 | Group stage | 13th | 3 | 0 | 1 | 2 | 0 | 4 | 4 | 3 | 0 | 1 | 7 | 1 |
| (Australia) 2015 | Third place | 3rd | 6 | 3 | 1 | 2 | 10 | 8 | 6 | 5 | 1 | 0 | 18 | 3 |
| (United Arab Emirates) 2019 | Semi Finals | 4th | 6 | 3 | 2 | 1 | 8 | 8 | Qualified as hosts | | | | | |
| (Qatar) 2023 | Round of 16 | 10th | 4 | 1 | 2 | 1 | 6 | 5 | 8 | 6 | 0 | 2 | 23 | 7 |
| (Saudi Arabia) 2027 | Qualified | | | | | | | | 6 | 5 | 1 | 0 | 16 | 2 |
| Total | Runners-up | 12/13 | 48 | 16 | 14 | 19 | 47 | 64 | 54 | 40 | 7 | 7 | 144 | 32 |

United Arab Emirates's Asian Cup record
| First match | United Arab Emirates 1–1 Kuwait (15 September 1980; Kuwait City, Kuwait) |
| Biggest Win | United Arab Emirates 4–1 Qatar (11 January 2015; Canberra, Australia) |
| Biggest Defeat | China 5–0 United Arab Emirates (11 December 1984; Kallang, Singapore) |
| Best Result | Runners-up in 1996 |
| Worst Result | Group stage in 1980, 1984, 1988, 2004, 2007, 2011 |

=== FIFA Confederations Cup ===
FIFA Confederations Cup
| Year | Round | Position | Pld | W | D | L | GF | GA |
|---|---|---|---|---|---|---|---|---|
| (Saudi Arabia) 1992 and (Saudi Arabia) 1995 | Did not qualify | | | | | | | |
| (Saudi Arabia) 1997 | Group stage | 6th | 3 | 1 | 0 | 2 | 2 | 8 |
| (Mexico) 1999 to (Russia) 2017 | Did not qualify | | | | | | | |
| Total | Group stage | 6th | 3 | 1 | 0 | 2 | 2 | 8 |

=== Asian Games ===
Asian Games
| Year | Result | M | W | D | L | GF | GA |
|---|---|---|---|---|---|---|---|
| 1964–1982 | Did not enter | | | | | | |
| (South Korea) 1986 | Quarter-finals | 5 | 3 | 2 | 0 | 7 | 4 |
| (China) 1990 | Did not enter | | | | | | |
| (Japan) 1994 | Quarter-finals | 4 | 1 | 2 | 1 | 6 | 5 |
| (Thailand) 1998 | Group stage | 4 | 1 | 1 | 2 | 5 | 10 |
| Total | Quarter-finals | 13 | 5 | 5 | 3 | 18 | 19 |

=== West Asian Football Federation Championship ===
WAFF Championship record
| Year | Round | Pld | W | D | L | GF | GA |
|---|---|---|---|---|---|---|---|
| (Jordan) 2000 | Did not participate | | | | | | |
| (Syria) 2002 | Did not participate | | | | | | |
| (Iran) 2004 | Did not participate | | | | | | |
| (Jordan) 2007 | Did not participate | | | | | | |
| (Iran) 2008 | Did not participate | | | | | | |
| (Jordan) 2010 | Did not participate | | | | | | |
| (Kuwait) 2012 | Did not participate | | | | | | |
| (Qatar) 2014 | Did not participate | | | | | | |
| (Iraq) 2019 | Did not participate | | | | | | |
| (Oman) 2026 | Qualified | | | | | | |
| Total | 1/10 | - | - | - | - | - | - |

=== Gulf Cup ===
Gulf Cup
| Year | Result | M | W | D | L | GF | GA |
|---|---|---|---|---|---|---|---|
| (Saudi Arabia) 1972 | Third place | 3 | 1 | 0 | 2 | 1 | 11 |
| (Kuwait) 1974 | Fourth place | 4 | 1 | 1 | 2 | 5 | 9 |
| (Qatar) 1976 | Fifth place | 6 | 0 | 2 | 4 | 4 | 13 |
| (Iraq) 1979 | Sixth place | 6 | 1 | 0 | 5 | 5 | 18 |
| (United Arab Emirates) 1982 | Third place | 5 | 3 | 0 | 2 | 7 | 6 |
| (Oman) 1984 | Fourth place | 6 | 2 | 3 | 1 | 5 | 4 |
| (Bahrain) 1986 | Runners-up | 6 | 3 | 2 | 1 | 10 | 7 |
| (Saudi Arabia) 1988 | Runners-up | 6 | 3 | 2 | 1 | 7 | 4 |
| (Kuwait) 1990 | Fifth place | 4 | 0 | 2 | 2 | 2 | 8 |
| (Qatar) 1992 | Fourth place | 5 | 3 | 0 | 2 | 4 | 3 |
| (United Arab Emirates) 1994 | Runners-up | 5 | 3 | 2 | 0 | 7 | 1 |
| (Oman) 1996 | Fourth place | 5 | 1 | 3 | 1 | 5 | 5 |
| (Bahrain) 1998 | Third place | 5 | 2 | 1 | 2 | 5 | 7 |
| (Saudi Arabia) 2002 | Sixth place | 5 | 1 | 0 | 4 | 3 | 7 |
| (Kuwait) 2003–04 | Fifth place | 6 | 2 | 1 | 3 | 6 | 7 |
| (Qatar) 2004 | Group stage | 3 | 0 | 2 | 1 | 4 | 5 |
| (United Arab Emirates) 2007 | Champions | 5 | 4 | 0 | 1 | 8 | 1 |
| (Oman) 2009 | Group stage | 3 | 1 | 1 | 1 | 3 | 4 |
| (Yemen) 2010 | Semi-finals | 4 | 1 | 2 | 1 | 3 | 2 |
| (Bahrain) 2013 | Champions | 5 | 5 | 0 | 0 | 10 | 3 |
| (Saudi Arabia) 2014 | Third place | 5 | 2 | 2 | 1 | 7 | 5 |
| (Kuwait) 2017–18 | Runners-up | 5 | 1 | 4 | 0 | 1 | 0 |
| (Qatar) 2019 | Group Stage | 3 | 1 | 0 | 2 | 5 | 6 |
| (Iraq) 2023 | Group Stage | 3 | 0 | 1 | 2 | 2 | 4 |
| (Kuwait) 2024–25 | Group Stage | 3 | 0 | 2 | 1 | 3 | 4 |
| (Saudi Arabia) 2026 | Qualified | | | | | | |
| Total | Champions | 117 | 41 | 31 | 42 | 122 | 143 |

=== FIFA Arab Cup ===
FIFA Arab Cup
| Year | Round | M | W | D | L | GF | GA |
|---|---|---|---|---|---|---|---|
| (Lebanon) 1963 | Did not enter | | | | | | |
| (Kuwait) 1964 | Did not enter | | | | | | |
| (Iraq) 1966 | Did not enter | | | | | | |
| (Saudi Arabia) 1985 | Did not enter | | | | | | |
| (Jordan) 1988 | Did not enter | | | | | | |
| (Syria) 1992 | Did not enter | | | | | | |
| (Qatar) 1998 | Fourth place | 4 | 1 | 0 | 3 | 6 | 8 |
| (Kuwait) 2002 | Did not enter | | | | | | |
| 2009 | Cancelled | | | | | | |
| (Saudi Arabia) 2012 | Did not enter | | | | | | |
| (Qatar) 2021 | Quarter-Finals | 4 | 2 | 0 | 2 | 3 | 7 |
| (Qatar) 2025 | Third place | 5 | 1 | 2* | 2 | 6 | 8 |
| Total | 3/11 | 13 | 4 | 2 | 7 | 15 | 23 |

=== Arab Games ===
Arab Games
| Year | Round | M | W | D | L | GF | GA |
|---|---|---|---|---|---|---|---|
| (Syria) 1976 | Did not enter | | | | | | |
| (Morocco) 1985 | Group stage | 3 | 1 | 0 | 2 | 2 | 3 |
| (Lebanon) 1997 | Group stage | 3 | 1 | 0 | 2 | 3 | 5 |
| (Jordan) 1999 | Second round | 5 | 1 | 2 | 2 | 5 | 5 |
| (Egypt) 2007 | Fourth place | 4 | 1 | 1 | 2 | 3 | 6 |
| (Qatar) 2011 | Did not enter | | | | | | |
| Total | Fourth place | 15 | 4 | 3 | 8 | 13 | 19 |

=== Other Tournaments ===
Other
| Year | Round | Position | GP | W | D* | L | GS | GA |
|---|---|---|---|---|---|---|---|---|
| (Libya) 1973 Palestine Cup of Nations | Group stage | 8th | 4 | 0 | 2 | 2 | 3 | 7 |
| (Tunisia) 1975 Palestine Cup of Nations | Group stage | 10th | 2 | 0 | 0 | 2 | 0 | 8 |
| (Malaysia) 1981 Merdeka Tournament | Fourth place | 4th | 5 | 2 | 0 | 3 | 6 | 10 |
| (Malaysia) 1982 Merdeka Tournament | Group stage | 5th | 4 | 1 | 0 | 3 | 5 | 8 |
| (United Arab Emirates) 1994 Friendship Tournament | Third place | 3rd | 3 | 0 | 1 | 2 | 1 | 3 |
| (United Arab Emirates) 1996 Friendship Tournament | Champions | 1st | 3 | 2 | 1 | 0 | 4 | 2 |
| (United Arab Emirates) 1998 Friendship Tournament | Champions | 1st | 3 | 3 | 0 | 0 | 4 | 1 |
| (United Arab Emirates) 1999 Friendship Tournament | Runner-ups | 2nd | 3 | 1 | 2 | 0 | 7 | 5 |
| 2000 Oman Cup | Champions | 1st | 3 | 2 | 1 | 0 | 2 | 1 |
| (United Arab Emirates) 2000 LG Cup | Champions | 1st | 2 | 1 | 1 | 0 | 2 | 1 |
| (Japan) 2005 Kirin Cup | Champions | 1st | 2 | 1 | 1 | 0 | 1 | 0 |
| (Switzerland) 2005 International Arab Friendly Tournament | Runner-ups | 2nd | 2 | 0 | 2 | 0 | 1 | 1 |
| (Ghana) 2007 Four Nations Tournament | Fourth place | 4th | 2 | 0 | 0 | 2 | 0 | 6 |
| (United Arab Emirates) 2008 Dubai Challenge Cup | Fourth place | 4th | 2 | 0 | 1 | 1 | 0 | 1 |
| (United Arab Emirates) 2009 UAE International Cup | Runner-ups | 2nd | 2 | 0 | 1 | 1 | 0 | 1 |
| (Saudi Arabia) 2013 OSN Cup | Champions | 1st | 2 | 1 | 1 | 0 | 5 | 3 |
| (Thailand) 2016 King's Cup | Fourth place | 4th | 2 | 0 | 0 | 2 | 1 | 4 |
| (Thailand) 2018 King's Cup | Fourth place | 4th | 2 | 0 | 0 | 2 | 1 | 3 |
| Total | 6 titles | 1st | 48 | 14 | 14 | 20 | 43 | 67 |

== Head-to-head record ==
As of 15 December 2025

| Opponent | Pld | W | D | L | GF | GA | GD |
|---|---|---|---|---|---|---|---|
| Algeria | 8 | 2 | 3 | 3 | 6 | 6 | 0 |
| Andorra | 1 | 0 | 1 | 0 | 0 | 0 | 0 |
| Angola | 1 | 0 | 0 | 1 | 0 | 2 | −2 |
| Argentina | 1 | 0 | 0 | 1 | 0 | 5 | –5 |
| Armenia | 1 | 0 | 0 | 1 | 3 | 4 | −1 |
| Australia | 7 | 1 | 2 | 4 | 2 | 7 | −5 |
| Azerbaijan | 1 | 0 | 1 | 0 | 3 | 3 | 0 |
| Bahrain | 33 | 15 | 7 | 12 | 54 | 46 | +8 |
| Bangladesh | 5 | 5 | 0 | 0 | 21 | 1 | +20 |
| Belarus | 2 | 1 | 0 | 1 | 3 | 3 | 0 |
| Benin | 2 | 0 | 1 | 1 | 0 | 1 | −1 |
| Bolivia | 1 | 0 | 1 | 0 | 0 | 0 | 0 |
| Brazil | 1 | 0 | 0 | 1 | 0 | 8 | −8 |
| Brunei | 2 | 2 | 0 | 0 | 16 | 0 | +16 |
| Bulgaria | 6 | 1 | 0 | 5 | 4 | 14 | −10 |
| Chile | 1 | 0 | 0 | 1 | 0 | 2 | −2 |
| China | 11 | 2 | 5 | 4 | 7 | 17 | −10 |
| Colombia | 1 | 0 | 0 | 1 | 0 | 2 | −2 |
| Costa Rica | 1 | 1 | 0 | 0 | 4 | 1 | +3 |
| Czech Republic | 2 | 0 | 1 | 1 | 1 | 6 | −5 |
| Denmark | 1 | 0 | 1 | 0 | 1 | 1 | 0 |
| Dominican Republic | 1 | 1 | 0 | 0 | 4 | 0 | +4 |
| Egypt | 11 | 1 | 6 | 4 | 8 | 12 | −4 |
| Estonia | 2 | 1 | 1 | 0 | 4 | 3 | +1 |
| Finland | 1 | 0 | 1 | 0 | 1 | 1 | 0 |
| Gabon | 1 | 0 | 0 | 1 | 0 | 1 | −1 |
| Gambia | 1 | 0 | 1 | 0 | 1 | 1 | 0 |
| Georgia | 1 | 1 | 0 | 0 | 1 | 0 | +1 |
| Germany (Note: Includes matches against West Germany.) | 3 | 0 | 0 | 3 | 3 | 14 | −11 |
| Haiti | 1 | 0 | 0 | 1 | 0 | 1 | −1 |
| Honduras | 3 | 0 | 2 | 1 | 1 | 2 | −1 |
| Hong Kong | 4 | 3 | 1 | 0 | 12 | 2 | +10 |
| Hungary | 2 | 0 | 0 | 2 | 1 | 6 | −5 |
| Iceland | 3 | 1 | 0 | 2 | 2 | 3 | −1 |
| India | 14 | 10 | 2 | 2 | 32 | 7 | +25 |
| Indonesia | 6 | 4 | 1 | 1 | 18 | 8 | +10 |
| Iran | 21 | 1 | 3 | 17 | 5 | 31 | −27 |
| Iraq | 32 | 7 | 13 | 12 | 31 | 46 | −15 |
| Japan | 20 | 6 | 8 | 6 | 18 | 22 | −4 |
| Jordan | 19 | 11 | 4 | 4 | 31 | 17 | +14 |
| Kazakhstan | 4 | 3 | 0 | 1 | 11 | 6 | +5 |
| Kenya | 1 | 0 | 1 | 0 | 2 | 2 | 0 |
| Kuwait | 44 | 18 | 8 | 18 | 53 | 76 | −23 |
| Kyrgyzstan | 5 | 4 | 1 | 0 | 11 | 3 | +8 |
| Laos | 3 | 3 | 0 | 0 | 9 | 0 | +9 |
| Lebanon | 15 | 10 | 4 | 1 | 27 | 14 | +12 |
| Libya | 4 | 1 | 2 | 1 | 8 | 5 | +3 |
| Lithuania | 1 | 0 | 1 | 0 | 1 | 1 | 0 |
| Malaysia | 12 | 10 | 0 | 2 | 32 | 7 | +25 |
| Mauritania | 1 | 1 | 0 | 0 | 1 | 0 | +1 |
| Mali | 1 | 0 | 1 | 0 | 0 | 0 | 0 |
| Malta | 2 | 0 | 2 | 0 | 1 | 1 | 0 |
| Mexico | 1 | 0 | 1 | 0 | 2 | 2 | 0 |
| Moldova | 1 | 1 | 0 | 0 | 3 | 2 | +1 |
| Morocco | 5 | 1 | 3 | 1 | 4 | 6 | –2 |
| Myanmar | 2 | 2 | 0 | 0 | 3 | 0 | +3 |
| Nepal | 3 | 3 | 0 | 0 | 19 | 0 | +19 |
| New Zealand | 2 | 2 | 0 | 0 | 3 | 0 | +3 |
| Niger | 1 | 1 | 0 | 0 | 4 | 0 | +4 |
| North Korea | 13 | 4 | 5 | 4 | 11 | 13 | −2 |
| Norway | 3 | 0 | 2 | 1 | 2 | 5 | −3 |
| Oman | 34 | 15 | 13 | 6 | 45 | 24 | +21 |
| Pakistan | 5 | 5 | 0 | 0 | 17 | 4 | +13 |
| Palestine | 6 | 2 | 3 | 1 | 7 | 3 | +4 |
| Paraguay | 2 | 0 | 1 | 1 | 0 | 1 | –1 |
| Peru | 1 | 0 | 1 | 0 | 0 | 0 | 0 |
| Philippines | 1 | 1 | 0 | 0 | 4 | 0 | +4 |
| Poland | 3 | 0 | 0 | 3 | 2 | 10 | −8 |
| Qatar | 35 | 12 | 9 | 14 | 44 | 47 | −3 |
| Romania | 1 | 1 | 0 | 0 | 2 | 1 | +1 |
| Russia | 1 | 0 | 0 | 1 | 0 | 1 | −1 |
| Saudi Arabia | 36 | 8 | 8 | 20 | 27 | 51 | −24 |
| Serbia (Note: Includes matches against Yugoslavia.) | 1 | 0 | 0 | 1 | 1 | 4 | −3 |
| Senegal | 4 | 1 | 2 | 1 | 7 | 8 | −1 |
| Singapore | 6 | 5 | 1 | 0 | 16 | 5 | +11 |
| Slovakia | 3 | 0 | 0 | 3 | 2 | 5 | −3 |
| Slovenia | 2 | 0 | 2 | 0 | 3 | 3 | 0 |
| South Africa | 1 | 1 | 0 | 0 | 1 | 0 | +1 |
| South Korea | 23 | 3 | 6 | 14 | 17 | 42 | −25 |
| Sri Lanka | 8 | 8 | 0 | 0 | 35 | 3 | +32 |
| Sudan | 2 | 2 | 0 | 0 | 6 | 2 | +4 |
| Sweden | 2 | 1 | 0 | 1 | 2 | 3 | −1 |
| Switzerland | 4 | 2 | 0 | 2 | 3 | 4 | −1 |
| Syria | 25 | 14 | 8 | 3 | 40 | 19 | +21 |
| Tajikistan | 3 | 1 | 2 | 0 | 4 | 3 | +1 |
| Thailand | 13 | 8 | 3 | 2 | 21 | 12 | +9 |
| Timor-Leste | 2 | 2 | 0 | 0 | 9 | 0 | +9 |
| Togo | 2 | 1 | 0 | 1 | 3 | 5 | −2 |
| Trinidad and Tobago | 2 | 0 | 1 | 1 | 3 | 5 | −2 |
| Tunisia | 5 | 0 | 0 | 5 | 2 | 10 | −8 |
| Turkmenistan | 4 | 2 | 1 | 1 | 9 | 4 | +5 |
| Ukraine | 1 | 0 | 1 | 0 | 1 | 1 | 0 |
| Uruguay | 1 | 0 | 0 | 1 | 0 | 2 | −2 |
| Uzbekistan | 19 | 9 | 5 | 5 | 25 | 20 | +5 |
| Venezuela | 2 | 0 | 0 | 2 | 0 | 6 | −6 |
| Vietnam | 7 | 5 | 0 | 2 | 16 | 6 | +10 |
| Yemen (Note: Includes matches against North Yemen.) | 15 | 12 | 0 | 3 | 34 | 14 | +20 |
| Total | 640 | 262 | 167 | 214 | 908 | 772 | +136 |

== Honours ==
=== Continental ===
- AFC Asian Cup
  - (silver) Runners-up (1): 1996
  - (bronze) Third place (1): 2015
- Asian Games
  - (silver) Runners-up (1): 2010
  - (bronze) Third place (1): 2018

=== Regional ===
- FIFA Arab Cup^{1}
  - (bronze) Third place (1): 2025
- Arabian Gulf Cup
  - (gold) Champions (2): 2007, 2013
  - (silver) Runners-up (4): 1986, 1988, 1994, 2017–18
  - (bronze) Third place (4): 1972, 1982, 1998, 2014

=== Friendly ===
- Friendship Tournament
  - (gold) Champions (3): 1996, 1998, 2000
  - (silver) Runners-up (1): 1999
  - (bronze) Third place (1): 2001
- Oman Cup
  - (gold) Champions (1): 2000
- Kirin Cup
  - (gold) Champions (1): 2005
- LG Cup
  - (gold) Champions (1): 2000
- OSN Cup
  - (gold) Champions (1): 2013
- UAE International Cup
  - (silver) Runners-up (1): 2009
- International Arab Friendly Tournament
  - (silver) Runners-up (1): 2005

=== Summary ===
Only official honours are included, according to FIFA statutes (competitions organized/recognized by FIFA or an affiliated confederation).

| Competition | 1st place, gold medalist(s) | 2nd place, silver medalist(s) | 3rd place, bronze medalist(s) | Total |
|---|---|---|---|---|
| AFC Asian Cup | 0 | 1 | 1 | 2 |
| FIFA Arab Cup | 0 | 0 | 1 | 1 |
| Total | 0 | 1 | 2 | 3 |

Notes

1. Official subregional competition organized and recognized by FIFA since 2021. Previous editions were organized by UAFA.

== Inclusion of naturalized players ==
In recent years, particularly after 2019, the United Arab Emirates began granting citizenship to football players on a wider scale, following a model seen in countries such as France and Qatar and benefiting from FIFA's more relaxed eligibility criteria.

Prior to this shift, naturalized players were relatively rare in the UAE national team. Notable examples include Mohammed Al-Anzi, born in Qatar, and Ismail Ahmed, born in Morocco. The Yemeni brothers Omar and Mohammed Abdulrahman were often an exception, as their naturalization was based on family registration certificates.

As with many association football teams worldwide, the United Arab Emirates has granted citizenship to certain players who are not of Emirati descent but are Emirati through their mothers or were born within the country. Prominent examples include Muhannad Salem, Yahya Nader, Abdalla Ramadan, Junior Ndiaye and Mohamed Awad Alla. This practice, however, is generally not regarded as naturalization in the broader sense.

=== Early cases ===
Among the first high-profile cases were the Argentine-born Sebastián Tagliabué of Al Wahda, and the two Brazilian-borns Fábio Lima of Al Wasl and Caio Canedo of Al Ain, who all received Emirati citizenship in January 2020.

The second high-profile cases were the Ivorian-born Kouame Auttone of Al Ain and the Moroccan-born Isam Faiz of Ajman, who both received Emirati citizenship by 2023.

The third high-profile case in August 2024 was the naturalization of two footballers Adli Mohamed, a goalkeeper for Southampton of Sudanese descent, and the English-born Mackenzie Hunt of Fleetwood Town. Both individuals were regarded as members of foreign communities residing in the United Arab Emirates.

Following these three high-profile cases, the pace of naturalization increased, and the naturalization of footballers in the United Arab Emirates expanded considerably. Eligibility was generally based on a five-year residency requirement for foreign players who had not represented another senior national team internationally, were not born in the UAE, and were not the children of Emirati mothers. Among the earliest players to be naturalized under these criteria, after the previous seven players, were the Brazilian-born footballers Marcus Meloni and Bruno, who were all called-up to the national team in October 2024.

=== Composition of the Squad ===
By March 2025, the national team had included twelve naturalized players out of twenty seven players in its squad: seven born in Brazil, and one each born in England, Morocco, Tunisia, and Ivory Coast, and the remaining fifteen were born in the United Arab Emirates.

By August 2025, naturalized players outnumbered players born in the United Arab Emirates within the national team squad for the first time. The naturalized group included sixteen players: nine born in Brazil, two born in Argentina, and one each born in Portugal, Ivory Coast, England, Croatia, and Tunisia, while the remaining fifteen players were born in the United Arab Emirates.
