= List of international goals scored by Ali Mabkhout =

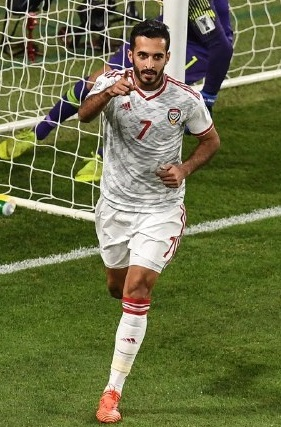
Mabkhout celebrating his goal against Australia at the 2019 AFC Asian Cup

Ali Mabkhout is an Emirati professional footballer who represented the United Arab Emirates national team between 2009 and 2024. He made his first appearance for the UAE on 15 November 2009 at Tahnoun bin Mohammed Stadium in Al Ain against Czech Republic in a friendly match. With 85 goals in 115 appearances, Mabkhout is the top scorer for his country. He was top goalscorer in the 2022 FIFA World Cup qualification.

Since making his first appearance for the national team in 2009, Mabkhout was an instrumental member of the United Arab Emirates, being part of the side during the 2015 and 2019 AFC Asian Cup, as well as participating in FIFA World Cup qualification and regional tournaments like the Arabian Gulf Cup. On 31 August 2019, in a friendly game against Sri Lanka, Mabkhout opened the scoring with his 50th international goal, and went on to get a hat-trick in an eventual 5–1 win. This made Mabkhout only the second Emirati player in history to score 50 goals for the side after Adnan Al Talyani. On 10 October 2019, Mabkhout scored a hat-trick against Indonesia in a 5–0 win, to become UAE's all-time leading goalscorer. (Note: Mabkhout's three goals against Sri Lanka on 31 August 2019 were initially considered in an unofficial friendly; hence, he become UAE's all-time leading goalscorer when he scored two goals against Malaysia on 10 September 2019.)

== International goals ==
Scores and results list United Arab Emirates's goal tally first.

International goals by date, venue, opponent, score, result and competition
No.	Date	Venue	Opponent	Score	Result	Competition
1	16 October 2012	Zabeel Stadium, Dubai, United Arab Emirates	Bahrain	1–0	6–2	Friendly
2	16 October 2012	Zabeel Stadium, Dubai, United Arab Emirates	Bahrain	2–2	6–2	Friendly
3	16 October 2012	Zabeel Stadium, Dubai, United Arab Emirates	Bahrain	4–2	6–2	Friendly
4	16 October 2012	Zabeel Stadium, Dubai, United Arab Emirates	Bahrain	5–2	6–2	Friendly
5	14 November 2012	Mohammed Bin Zayed Stadium, Abu Dhabi, United Arab Emirates	Estonia	2–1	2–1	Friendly
6	5 January 2013	Khalifa Sports City Stadium, Isa Town, Bahrain	Qatar	2–1	3–1	21st Arabian Gulf Cup
7	8 January 2013	Bahrain National Stadium, Riffa, Bahrain	Bahrain	1–0	2–1	21st Arabian Gulf Cup
8	22 March 2013	Mohammed Bin Zayed Stadium, Abu Dhabi, United Arab Emirates	Uzbekistan	2–1	2–1	2015 AFC Asian Cup qualification
9	5 September 2013	King Fahd International Stadium, Riyadh, Saudi Arabia	Trinidad and Tobago	2–0	3–3	2013 OSN Cup
10	9 September 2013	King Fahd International Stadium, Riyadh, Saudi Arabia	New Zealand	2–0	2–0	2013 OSN Cup
—	5 October 2013	Shenzhen Stadium, Shenzhen, China	Laos	2–0	2–0	Unofficial friendly
—	9 October 2013	Shenzhen Stadium, Shenzhen, China	Malaysia	3–0	3–1	Unofficial friendly
11	15 October 2013	Hong Kong Stadium, So Kon Po, Hong Kong	Hong Kong	1–0	4–0	2015 AFC Asian Cup qualification
12	15 October 2013	Hong Kong Stadium, So Kon Po, Hong Kong	Hong Kong	2–0	4–0	2015 AFC Asian Cup qualification
13	15 October 2013	Hong Kong Stadium, So Kon Po, Hong Kong	Hong Kong	3–0	4–0	2015 AFC Asian Cup qualification
14	9 November 2013	Al Nahyan Stadium, Abu Dhabi, United Arab Emirates	Philippines	4–0	4–0	Friendly
15	19 November 2013	Mohammed Bin Zayed Stadium, Abu Dhabi, United Arab Emirates	Vietnam	3–0	5–0	2015 AFC Asian Cup qualification
16	19 November 2013	Mohammed Bin Zayed Stadium, Abu Dhabi, United Arab Emirates	Vietnam	5–0	5–0	2015 AFC Asian Cup qualification
17	17 November 2014	Prince Faisal bin Fahd Stadium, Riyadh, Saudi Arabia	Kuwait	1–0	2–2	22nd Arabian Gulf Cup
18	17 November 2014	Prince Faisal bin Fahd Stadium, Riyadh, Saudi Arabia	Kuwait	2–0	2–2	22nd Arabian Gulf Cup
19	20 November 2014	King Fahd International Stadium, Riyadh, Saudi Arabia	Iraq	1–0	2–0	22nd Arabian Gulf Cup
20	20 November 2014	King Fahd International Stadium, Riyadh, Saudi Arabia	Iraq	2–0	2–0	22nd Arabian Gulf Cup
21	25 November 2014	Prince Faisal bin Fahd Stadium, Riyadh, Saudi Arabia	Oman	1–0	1–0	22nd Arabian Gulf Cup
22	11 January 2015	Canberra Stadium, Canberra, Australia	Qatar	3–1	4–1	2015 AFC Asian Cup
23	11 January 2015	Canberra Stadium, Canberra, Australia	Qatar	4–1	4–1	2015 AFC Asian Cup
24	15 January 2015	Canberra Stadium, Canberra, Australia	Bahrain	1–0	2–1	2015 AFC Asian Cup
25	23 January 2015	Stadium Australia, Sydney, Australia	Japan	1–0	1–1	2015 AFC Asian Cup
26	30 January 2015	Newcastle Stadium, Newcastle, Australia	Iraq	3–2	3–2	2015 AFC Asian Cup
27	3 September 2015	Mohammed Bin Zayed Stadium, Abu Dhabi, United Arab Emirates	Malaysia	2–0	10–0	2018 FIFA World Cup qualification
28	3 September 2015	Mohammed Bin Zayed Stadium, Abu Dhabi, United Arab Emirates	Malaysia	6–0	10–0	2018 FIFA World Cup qualification
29	3 September 2015	Mohammed Bin Zayed Stadium, Abu Dhabi, United Arab Emirates	Malaysia	8–0	10–0	2018 FIFA World Cup qualification
30	5 November 2015	Mohammed Bin Zayed Stadium, Abu Dhabi, United Arab Emirates	Turkmenistan	3–1	5–1	Friendly
31	5 November 2015	Mohammed Bin Zayed Stadium, Abu Dhabi, United Arab Emirates	Turkmenistan	4–1	5–1	Friendly
32	5 November 2015	Mohammed Bin Zayed Stadium, Abu Dhabi, United Arab Emirates	Turkmenistan	5–1	5–1	Friendly
33	12 November 2015	Mohammed Bin Zayed Stadium, Abu Dhabi, United Arab Emirates	Timor-Leste	1–0	8–0	2018 FIFA World Cup qualification
34	12 November 2015	Mohammed Bin Zayed Stadium, Abu Dhabi, United Arab Emirates	Timor-Leste	2–0	8–0	2018 FIFA World Cup qualification
35	16 January 2016	Mohammed Bin Zayed Stadium, Abu Dhabi, United Arab Emirates	Iceland	2–1	2–1	Friendly
36	6 October 2016	Mohammed Bin Zayed Stadium, Abu Dhabi, United Arab Emirates	Thailand	1–0	3–1	2018 FIFA World Cup qualification
37	6 October 2016	Mohammed Bin Zayed Stadium, Abu Dhabi, United Arab Emirates	Thailand	2–0	3–1	2018 FIFA World Cup qualification
38	7 June 2017	Shah Alam Stadium, Selangor, Malaysia	Laos	1–0	4–0	Friendly
39	7 June 2017	Shah Alam Stadium, Selangor, Malaysia	Laos	3–0	4–0	Friendly
40	13 June 2017	Rajamangala Stadium, Bangkok, Thailand	Thailand	1–1	1–1	2018 FIFA World Cup qualification
41	29 August 2017	Hazza Bin Zayed Stadium, Al Ain, United Arab Emirates	Saudi Arabia	1–1	2–1	2018 FIFA World Cup qualification
42	14 November 2017	Khalifa International Stadium, Al Ain, United Arab Emirates	Uzbekistan	1–0	1–0	Friendly
43	22 December 2017	Jaber Al-Ahmad International Stadium, Kuwait City, Kuwait	Oman	1–0	1–0	23rd Arabian Gulf Cup
44	11 September 2018	Estadi Palamós Costa Brava, Palamós, Spain	Laos	1–0	3–0	Friendly
45	11 September 2018	Estadi Palamós Costa Brava, Palamós, Spain	Laos	2–0	3–0	Friendly
46	10 January 2019	Zayed Sports City Stadium, Abu Dhabi, United Arab Emirates	India	2–0	2–0	2019 AFC Asian Cup
47	14 January 2019	Hazza bin Zayed Stadium, Al Ain, United Arab Emirates	Thailand	1–0	1–1	2019 AFC Asian Cup
48	21 January 2019	Zayed Sports City Stadium, Abu Dhabi, United Arab Emirates	Kyrgyzstan	2–1	3–2 (a.e.t.)	2019 AFC Asian Cup
49	25 January 2019	Hazza bin Zayed, Al Ain, United Arab Emirates	Australia	1–0	1–0	2019 AFC Asian Cup
50	21 March 2019	Al Nahyan Stadium, Abu Dhabi, United Arab Emirates	Saudi Arabia	2–1	2–1	Friendly
51	31 August 2019	Bahrain National Stadium, Riffa, Bahrain	Sri Lanka	1–0	5–1	Friendly
52	31 August 2019	Bahrain National Stadium, Riffa, Bahrain	Sri Lanka	2–0	5–1	Friendly
53	31 August 2019	Bahrain National Stadium, Riffa, Bahrain	Sri Lanka	3–0	5–1	Friendly
54	10 September 2019	Bukit Jalil National Stadium, Kuala Lumpur, Malaysia	Malaysia	1–1	2–1	2022 FIFA World Cup qualification
55	10 September 2019	Bukit Jalil National Stadium, Kuala Lumpur, Malaysia	Malaysia	2–1	2–1	2022 FIFA World Cup qualification
56	10 October 2019	Al Maktoum Stadium, Dubai, United Arab Emirates	Indonesia	2–0	5–0	2022 FIFA World Cup qualification
57	10 October 2019	Al Maktoum Stadium, Dubai, United Arab Emirates	Indonesia	3–0	5–0	2022 FIFA World Cup qualification
58	10 October 2019	Al Maktoum Stadium, Dubai, United Arab Emirates	Indonesia	4–0	5–0	2022 FIFA World Cup qualification
59	15 October 2019	Thammasat Stadium, Pathum Thani, Thailand	Thailand	1–1	1–2	2022 FIFA World Cup qualification
60	26 November 2019	Abdullah bin Khalifa Stadium, Doha, Qatar	Yemen	1–0	3–0	24th Arabian Gulf Cup
61	26 November 2019	Abdullah bin Khalifa Stadium, Doha, Qatar	Yemen	2–0	3–0	24th Arabian Gulf Cup
62	26 November 2019	Abdullah bin Khalifa Stadium, Doha, Qatar	Yemen	3–0	3–0	24th Arabian Gulf Cup
63	2 December 2019	Khalifa International Stadium, Doha, Qatar	Qatar	1–2	2–4	24th Arabian Gulf Cup
64	2 December 2019	Khalifa International Stadium, Doha, Qatar	Qatar	2–3	2–4	24th Arabian Gulf Cup
65	12 November 2020	Zabeel Stadium, Dubai, United Arab Emirates	Tajikistan	1–2	3–2	Friendly
66	12 November 2020	Zabeel Stadium, Dubai, United Arab Emirates	Tajikistan	2–2	3–2	Friendly
67	29 March 2021	Zabeel Stadium, Dubai, United Arab Emirates	India	1–0	6–0	Friendly
68	29 March 2021	Zabeel Stadium, Dubai, United Arab Emirates	India	2–0	6–0	Friendly
69	29 March 2021	Zabeel Stadium, Dubai, United Arab Emirates	India	3–0	6–0	Friendly
70	24 May 2021	Rashid Stadium, Dubai, United Arab Emirates	Jordan	1–0	5–1	Friendly
71	24 May 2021	Rashid Stadium, Dubai, United Arab Emirates	Jordan	2–0	5–1	Friendly
72	24 May 2021	Rashid Stadium, Dubai, United Arab Emirates	Jordan	4–0	5–1	Friendly
73	3 June 2021	Zabeel Stadium, Dubai, United Arab Emirates	Malaysia	1–0	4–0	2022 FIFA World Cup qualification
74	3 June 2021	Zabeel Stadium, Dubai, United Arab Emirates	Malaysia	3–0	4–0	2022 FIFA World Cup qualification
75	11 June 2021	Zabeel Stadium, Dubai, United Arab Emirates	Indonesia	1–0	5–0	2022 FIFA World Cup qualification
76	11 June 2021	Zabeel Stadium, Dubai, United Arab Emirates	Indonesia	3–0	5–0	2022 FIFA World Cup qualification
77	15 June 2021	Zabeel Stadium, Dubai, United Arab Emirates	Vietnam	2–0	3–2	2022 FIFA World Cup qualification
78	7 September 2021	King Abdullah II Stadium, Amman, Jordan	Syria	1–0	1–1	2022 FIFA World Cup qualification
79	12 October 2021	Zabeel Stadium, Dubai, United Arab Emirates	Iraq	2–2	2–2	2022 FIFA World Cup qualification
80	16 November 2021	Saida Municipal Stadium, Sidon, Lebanon	Lebanon	1–0	1–0	2022 FIFA World Cup qualification
81	29 May 2022	Zabeel Stadium, Dubai, United Arab Emirates	Gambia	1–0	1–1	Friendly
82	16 November 2023	Al Maktoum Stadium, Dubai, United Arab Emirates	Nepal	2–0	4–0	2026 FIFA World Cup qualification
83	16 November 2023	Al Maktoum Stadium, Dubai, United Arab Emirates	Nepal	3–0	4–0	2026 FIFA World Cup qualification
84	21 November 2023	Bahrain National Stadium, Riffa, Bahrain	Bahrain	2–0	2–0	2026 FIFA World Cup qualification
85	30 December 2023	Mohammed bin Zayed Stadium, Abu Dhabi, United Arab Emirates	Kyrgyzstan	1–0	1–0	Friendly

== Hat-tricks ==
No.	Date	Venue	Opponent	Goals	Result	Competition	Ref.
1	16 October 2012	Zabeel Stadium, Dubai, United arab Emirates	Bahrain	4 – (19', 39', 53', 65')	6–2	Friendly	
2	15 October 2013	Hong Kong Stadium, Hong Kong	Hong Kong	3 – (30', 55', 90')	4–0	Asian Cup qualification	
3	3 September 2015	Mohammed bin Zayed Stadium, Abu Dhabi, United Arab Emirates	Malaysia	3 – (22', 33', 75')	10–0	World Cup qualification	
4	5 November 2015	Mohammed bin Zayed Stadium, Abu Dhabi, United Arab Emirates	Turkmenistan	3 – (64', 76', 81')	5–1	Friendly	
5	31 August 2019	Bahrain National Stadium, Riffa, Bahrain	Sri Lanka	3 – (18' pen., 42', 52')	5–1	Friendly	
6	10 October 2019	Al Maktoum Stadium, Dubai, United Arab Emirates	Indonesia	3 – (51', 63' pen., 72')	5–0	World Cup qualification	
7	26 November 2019	Abdullah bin Khalifa Stadium, Doha, Qatar	Yemen	3 – (21', 38', 54')	3–0	Gulf Cup	
8	29 March 2021	Zabeel Stadium, Dubai, United Arab Emirates	India	3 – (12', 32' pen., 60')	6–0	Friendly	
9	24 May 2021	Rashid Stadium, Dubai, United Arab Emirates	Jordan	3 – (17' pen., 29', 50')	5–1	Friendly	

== Statistics ==
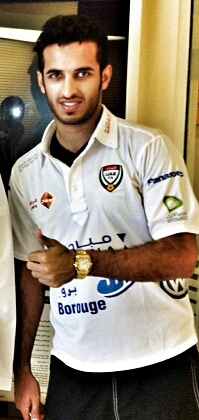
Mabkhout in early January 2015, during the 2015 AFC Asian Cup.

Appearances and goals by year
Year	Apps	Goals
2009	1	0
2010	1	0
2012	6	5
2013	11	11
2014	15	5
2015	14	13
2016	8	3
2017	9	6
2018	6	2
2019	15	19
2020	2	2
2021	16	14
2022	5	1
2023	5	4
2024	1	0
Total	115	85

Goals by competition
Competition	Goals
FIFA World Cup qualification	22
AFC Asian Cup	9
AFC Asian Cup qualification	6
Arabian Gulf Cup	13
OSN Cup	2
Friendlies	33
Total	85

Goals by nation
Opponents	Goals
Bahrain	7
Malaysia	7
Indonesia	5
Qatar	5
Thailand	5
India	4
Iraq	4
Laos	4
Hong Kong	3
Jordan	3
Sri Lanka	3
Turkmenistan	3
Vietnam	3
Yemen	3
Kuwait	2
Kyrgyzstan	2
Nepal	2
Oman	2
Saudi Arabia	2
Tajikistan	2
Timor-Leste	2
Uzbekistan	2
Australia	1
Estonia	1
Gambia	1
Iceland	1
Japan	1
Lebanon	1
New Zealand	1
Philippines	1
Syria	1
Trinidad and Tobago	1

== See also ==
- List of top international men's football goalscorers by country
- List of men's footballers with 100 or more international caps
- List of men's footballers with 50 or more international goals
