= Adli Mohamed =

Bahraini footballer (born 2004)

Personal information
- Full name: Adli Hatim Othman Husain Elkhidir Mohamed
- Date of birth: 15 September 2004 (age 22)
- Place of birth: Manama, Bahrain
- Height: 1.95 m (6 ft 5 in)
- Position: Goalkeeper

Team information
- Current team: Emirates (on loan from Al-Nasr)
- Number: 53

Youth career
- Dubai City
- 2021–2025: Southampton

Senior career*
Years	Team	Apps	(Gls)
2024–2025	Southampton	0	(0)
2025	→ Dubai United (loan)	9	(0)
2025–	Al-Nasr	0	(0)
2026–	→ Emirates (loan)	0	(0)
- * Club domestic league appearances and goals as of 08:28, 2 May 2025 (UTC)

Adli Mohamed (Arabic: عَدْلِيّ مُحَمَّد; born 15 September 2004) is a Bahraini professional footballer who plays as a goalkeeper for Emirates, on loan from Al-Nasr.

== Club career ==
As a youth player, Mohamed joined the youth academy of Emirati side Dubai City. Following his stint at the club, he joined the youth academy of English side Southampton. During the 2023–24 season, he signed his first professional contract with the club and made his debut for their under-21 team.

On 14 February 2025, Mohamed joined UAE First Division side Dubai United on loan for the remainder of the season.

On 15 June 2025, he joined UAE Pro League side Al-Nasr.

On 8 February 2026, Mohamed joined UAE First Division side Emirates on loan for the remainder of the season.

On 28 October 2026, Mohamed made his debut for Al-Nasr against Al-Zawraa, where his side beat them 1-0.

== International career ==
In 2024, he was called up to the United Arab Emirates national football team for the first time. In addition, he is eligible to play for the Bahrain national football team, as well as the Sudan national football team due to his Sudanese heritage.

== Style of play ==
Mohamed plays as a goalkeeper. The Arabic version of football website 365Scores described him as "distinguished by his ability to deal with crosses in a distinctive way... also good at playing with his feet and building attacks".
