= Caio Zanardi =

Brazilian football manager

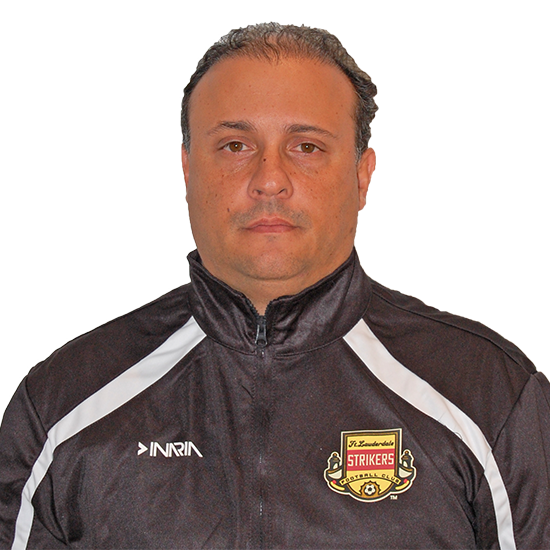
- Zanardi in 2017

Personal information
- Full name: Caio César Zanardi Gomes da Silva
- Date of birth: 8 August 1973 (age 53)
- Place of birth: São Paulo, Brazil

Team information
- Current team: Boavista (head coach)

Youth career
- Years: Team
- 1986–1992: São Paulo
- 1992: Portuguesa
- 1992–1995: Corinthians

Managerial career
- 2000–2004: Palmeiras U17
- 2004–2006: Pão de Açúcar U20
- 2005: Juventus-SP (interim)
- 2006: Vilnius
- 2007: Paulista B
- 2013–2015: Brazil U17
- 2015–2016: Fort Lauderdale Strikers
- 2017: Desportivo Brasil
- 2017–2018: Atlético Mineiro U23
- 2018: Desportivo Brasil
- 2018–2019: Al Nasr (Dubai)
- 2020–2021: Khor Fakkan
- 2022: Al Bataeh
- 2023: Ajman
- 2024: Dibba Al-Hisn
- 2025–: Boavista

Caio César Zanardi Gomes da Silva (born 8 August 1973) is a Brazilian football coach, currently the head coach of Boavista.

== Career ==
In 2006, Zanardi was appointed manager of Lithuanian side Vilnius. In 2013, he was appointed manager of Brazil U17, helping them win the 2015 South American U-17 Championship. In 2015, he was appointed manager of Fort Lauderdale Strikers in the United States. In 2017, Zanardi was appointed manager of Brazilian club Desportivo Brasil. In 2018, he was appointed manager of Al Nasr (Dubai) in the United Arab Emirates. In 2020, he was appointed technical director of Portuguese team Oliveirense. In 2020, Zanardi was appointed manager of Khor Fakkan in the United Arab Emirates.

== Personal life ==
Zanardi's younger brother Márcio is also a football manager.
