= Gustavo Alemão =

Brazilian footballer (born 2000)

Personal information
- Full name: Gustavo Alex Mueller
- Date of birth: 23 March 2000 (age 26)
- Place of birth: Itapiranga, Brazil
- Height: 1.85 m (6 ft 1 in)
- Position: Defender

Team information
- Current team: Al-Nasr
- Number: 3

Youth career
- –2019: Ituano
- 2019–2020: Flamengo
- 2020–: Sharjah

Senior career*
Years	Team	Apps	(Gls)
2018	Ituano	0	(0)
2021–2023	Sharjah	18	(2)
2023–	Al Nasr	28	(1)
- * Club domestic league appearances and goals as of 03:53, 21 December 2024 (UTC)

Gustavo Alex Mueller (born 23 March 2000), commonly known as Gustavo Alemão, is a Brazilian footballer who plays as a defender for Al-Nasr.

== Club career ==
On 4 July 2023 he joined Al-Nasr.

== International career ==
Born in Brazil, Alemão was naturalized as Emirati after more than 5 years in the country. He was called up to the United Arab Emirates national team for a set of 2026 FIFA World Cup qualification matches in November 2025.

== Career statistics ==
=== Club ===
As of 3 February 2021.

Club	Season	League			State League		Cup		Other		Total	
Club	Season	Division	Apps	Goals	Apps	Goals	Apps	Goals	Apps	Goals	Apps	Goals
Ituano	2018	–			0	0	0	0	1 (Note: Appearances in the Copa Paulista)	0	1	0
Sharjah	2020–21	Arabian Gulf League	0	0	–		1 (Note: Appearances in the UAE League Cup)	0	0	0	1	0
Career total			0	0	0	0	1	0	1	0	2	0
