= Sunday Manara =

Tanzanian footballer (born 1952)

Personal information
- Full name: Sunday Ramadhan Manara
- Date of birth: 23 November 1952 (age 73)
- Place of birth: Tanzania
- Position: Winger

Senior career*
Years	Team	Apps	(Gls)
–1974	Yanga		
1975–1976	Pan African		
1977–1978	Heracles Almelo		
1979	Pan African		
1979	New York Eagles		
1980	FC St. Veit		
- Al Nasr

International career
1974–1987	Tanzania		
- * Club domestic league appearances and goals

Sunday Ramadhan Manara (born 23 November 1952) is a Tanzanian former professional footballer who played as a winger.

== Career ==
Nicknamed 'Computer', Manara signed for Dutch side Heracles Almelo in 1977, becoming the first Tanzanian to play in Europe. In 1979, he signed for New York Eagles in the United States. Before the second half of 1979–90, he signed for Austrian club FC St. Veit. After that, Manara signed for Al Nasr in the United Arab Emirates.
