= Al-Nasr SC (Dubai) =

Association football club in Dubai

Al Nasr SC نادي النصر الرياضي
- Full name: Al-Nasr Sport Club
- Nickname: Al Ameed
- Founded: 1945; 81 years ago
- Ground: Al Maktoum Stadium
- Capacity: 15,058
- Owner: Rashid bin Hamdan bin Rashid Al Maktoum
- Chairman: Marwan bin Ghulaita
- Head coach: Miloš Milojević
- League: UAE Pro League
- 2025–26: UAE Pro League, 6th
- Website: www.alnasrclub.com
Home colours	Away colours	Third colours

Al-Nasr CSC (Arabic: نادي النصر الرياضي, romanized: nādī an-naṣr ar-riyāḍī, lit. 'Victory Sports Club') is an Emirati professional football club based in Al Nasr, Dubai and competes in the UAE Pro League. Al-Nasr, literally translating to "victory" in Arabic, was founded in 1945 and is considered as the first and oldest club in the United Arab Emirates.

== History ==
=== Pre–UAE League era (1945–1973) ===
Al Nasr Sports Club was founded by a group of young men in a Al Ghubaiba, Dubai in 1945, making it the oldest club in UAE footballing history. The team played in an empty playground near a highschool for three years until in 1948 were they finally decided to establish modern rules of football. In 1951, Sheikh Rashid bin Saeed Al Maktoum chose the headquarters to be in a cafe close to a fish market, the cafe had a room for rent so the club would rent the room for meetings, gatherings and studying. The club would later move their headquarters to Shindagha. During this period the club went on with the name Al Ahli until in the 1960s where the players traveled to Qatar to face Al Ahli and lose, after their loss in Qatar, the players proposed to change the name to Al Nasr which would later become official. The club decided to move their headquarters to a larger house in Shindagha and invited Sheikh Zayed bin Sultan Al Nahyan to meet the club in their new headquarters, Sheikh Zayed decided to donate 60,000 AED as a gift to the club, they would use the money to develop the club.

=== Rise of competition (1973–1990) ===
In 1973, the UAE Pro League was established and neighboring teams emerged forcing Al Nasr to start building a proper venue, so the construction of Al Maktoum Stadium began, however the team would join the league in 1974 so the club played their home games in Rashid Stadium until the completion of Al Makhtoum stadium in 1980, the club would win 3 UAE league, 3 presidents cup titles and a UAE federation cups during this time. The club would also be noted for hosting games with big clubs like Arsenal, Liverpool and Santos.

=== Modern era (1990–present) ===
After the end of the eighties, the club has yet to win the league but won notable cup competitions such as the president's cup, league cup and the GCC Champions League, around 2018 the team would renovate the Al Makhtoum Stadium for the 2019 AFC Asian Cup and host another friendly with Arsenal in 2019. Al Nasr removed coach Caio Zanardi and replaced him with former Dinamo Zagreb player and national Croatian player Krunoslav Jurčić, but he left Al Nasr in February 2021 after mediocre results in the league, and Jurcic was replaced with former River Plate coach Ramón Díaz.

== Rivalries ==
The team has a big rivalry with Al Wasl, often called the Bur Dubai Derby or just simply Dubai Derby, both teams have competed to see which club is the best team in Bur Dubai area. It also has a rivalry with Shabab Al Ahli which is also based in the same city but not in the same area.

== Honours ==
=== Domestic competitions ===
- UAE Pro League
  - Winners (3): 1977–78, 1978–79, 1985–86
  - Runners-up (4): 1980–81, 1984–85, 1999–2000, 2011–12
- UAE President's Cup
  - Winners (4): 1984–85, 1985–86, 1988–89, 2014–15
  - Runners-up (8): 1974–75, 1979–80, 1983–84, 1991–92, 1996–97, 2016–17, 2020–21, 2023–24
- UAE Super Cup
  - Winners (2): 1990, 1996
  - Runners-up (1): 2015
- UAE Federation Cup
  - Winners (3): 1987–88, 1999–2000, 2001–02
- UAE League Cup
  - Winners (2): 2015, 2020
- Joint League Cup
  - Winners (1): 1984–85
- ADNOC Championship Cup
  - Winners (1): 1993

=== Regional competitions ===
- GCC Champions League
  - Winners (1): 2014
- Qatar–UAE Super Cup
  - Winners (1): 2025

== Performance in AFC competitions ==
- AFC Champions League: 4 appearances

2012: Group Stage
2013: Group Stage
2016: Quarter-finals
2019: Play off Round

- Asian Club Championship: 2 appearances

1987: Group Stage
1998: Withdrew (first round)

- Asian Cup Winners Cup: 1 appearance

1993–94: Withdrew

== Staff ==
=== Board of directors ===
Title	Name
Chairman	(United Arab Emirates) Faisal bin Hamdan Al Maktoum
Vice Chairman	(United Arab Emirates) Abdullah bin Hamdan Al Maktoum
Board Member	(United Arab Emirates) Abbas bin Hamdan Al Maktoum
Board Member	(United Arab Emirates) Nayef bin Maktoum Al Maktoum
Board Member	(United Arab Emirates) Saeed bin Maktoum Al Maktoum
Board Member	(United Arab Emirates) Osama bin Mohammed Al Maktoum
Board Member	(United Arab Emirates) Abdulrazzaq AlHashemi

=== Coaching staff ===
Position	Name
Head coach	(Serbia) Miloš Milojević
Assistant Coach	(Netherlands) Bart Schreuder
Goalkeeper Coach	(Italy) Vincenzo Di Palma Esposito
Youth Coach	(Portugal) Rui Gaivoto (Spain) Rubén de la Red (Portugal) Gonçalo Pinto
Video Analyst	(Netherlands) Marvin van der Valk
Performance Manager	(Netherlands) Marco van der Steen
Chief Scout	(Portugal) Bruno Simões
Club Doctor	(Croatia) Jurica Rakic
Physiotherapist	(United Arab Emirates) Salem Al-Balooshi
Masseur	(United Arab Emirates) Hussain Al-Maazmi
Kitman	(United Arab Emirates) Abdullah Al-Ameri

== Players ==
As of UAE Pro-League:

Note: Flags indicate national team as defined under FIFA eligibility rules; some limited exceptions apply. Players may hold more than one non-FIFA nationality.

No.	Pos.	Nation	Player
2	DF	UAE	Salem Sultan
3	DF	BRA	Gustavo Alemão
4	DF	BRA	Gláuber
5	MF	UAE	Mohammed Abdulbasit
6	MF	UAE	Hussain Mahdi
7	MF	COL	Kevin Agudelo
8	MF	ROU	Marius Marin
9	FW	CIV	Chris Bedia
10	MF	IRI	Mehdi Ghayedi
12	GK	UAE	Ahmed Shambih
14	DF	BRA	Felipe Motta
17	MF	CPV	Wesley Delgado
21	DF	UAE	Abdulla Idrees
22	DF	NOR	Marius Høibråten
24	DF	UAE	Zayed Sultan
25	GK	UAE	Omar Ahmed
28	FW	CIV	Abdoulaye Touré
30	DF	BRA	João Moreira
37	GK	UAE	Saeed Maqdami
38	MF	SEN	Moussa N'Diaye

No.	Pos.	Nation	Player
42	FW	CMR	Leonel Wamba
45	FW	BRA	Lucas Louback
46	DF	UAE	Mubarak Zamah
53	GK	BHR	Adli Mohamed
55	DF	SRB	David Petrović
57	MF	UAE	Isam Faiz
70	MF	AUS	Ajdin Hrustić
75	MF	SDN	Zaid Osama
77	FW	MAR	Nassim Chadli (on loan from Al-Ain)
79	DF	JOR	Yousef Al-Maqableh
80	FW	YEM	Salem Al-Somhi
88	MF	UAE	Ali Abdulaziz
92	DF	SEN	Cheikc Seck
97	MF	UAE	Khamis Nasser
99	GK	SRB	Stefan Pjanovic
—	DF	BRA	Kauã Branco
—	DF	UAE	Ahmed Al-Balooshi

=== Unregistered players ===
Note: Flags indicate national team as defined under FIFA eligibility rules; some limited exceptions apply. Players may hold more than one non-FIFA nationality.

No.	Pos.	Nation	Player
13	FW	ARG	Ramón Miérez

Players with Multiple Nationalities

- (United Arab Emirates) (Bahrain) (Sudan) Adli Mohamed
- (United Arab Emirates) (Brazil) Gláuber
- (United Arab Emirates) (Brazil) Gustavo Alemão
- (United Arab Emirates) (Colombia) Kevin Agudelo
- (United Arab Emirates) (Ivory Coast) Abdoulaye Touré

== Notable players ==
Argentina

- (Argentina) Andrés Guglielminpietro
- (Argentina) Mauro Zárate

Australia

- (Australia) Mark Bresciano
- (Australia) Brett Holman

Bosnia and Herzegovina

- (Bosnia and Herzegovina) Samir Memišević

Brazil

- (Brazil) Careca
- (Brazil) Renato
- (Brazil) Valder
- (Brazil) Léo Lima
- (Brazil) Renan Garcia
- (Brazil) Wanderley
- (Brazil) Nilmar
- (Brazil) Marcelo Cirino
- (Brazil) Iury
- (Brazil) Junior Dutra
- (Brazil) Gabriel Valentini
- (Brazil) Marquinhos Gabriel
- (Brazil) Gláuber

Burkina Faso

- (Burkina Faso) Jonathan Pitroipa

Burundi

- (Burundi) Juma Mossi

Bulgaria

- (Bulgaria) Marcelinho

Cape Verde

- (Cape Verde) Ryan Mendes

Chile

- (Chile) Esteban Pavez
- (Chile) Luis Jiménez
- (Chile) Ronnie Fernández

Côte d'Ivoire

- (Ivory Coast) Amara Diané

Curaçao

- (Curaçao) Brandley Kuwas

DR Congo

- (Democratic Republic of the Congo) Isaac Tshibangu
- (Democratic Republic of the Congo) Cédric Bakambu

Ecuador

- (Ecuador) Carlos Tenorio

France

- (France) Yohan Cabaye
- (France) Jirès Kembo Ekoko

Gambia

- (The Gambia) Dembo Darboe

Ghana

- (Ghana) Felix Aboagye

Guinea

- (Guinea) Ismaël Bangoura

Iran

- (Iran) Khodadad Azizi
- (Iran) Karim Bagheri
- (Iran) Arash Borhani
- (Iran) Reza Enayati
- (Iran) Ebrahim Ghasempour
- (Iran) Sattar Hamedani
- (Iran) Mehrzad Madanchi
- (Iran) Farhad Majidi
- (Iran) Iman Mobali
- (Iran) Mohammad Nosrati

Iraq

- (Iraq) Hussein Alaa Hussein
- (Iraq) Mohannad Abdul-Raheem

Israel

- (Israel) Dia Saba

Italy

- (Italy) Manolo Gabbiadini
- (Italy) Giuseppe Mascara
- (Italy) Luca Toni

Japan

- (Japan) Takayuki Morimoto

Lebanon

- (Lebanon) Joan Oumari

Morocco

- (Morocco) Anouar Diba
- (Morocco) Ali Boussaboun
- (Morocco) Abdelaziz Barrada
- (Morocco) Adel Taarabt

Nigeria

- (Nigeria) Endurance Idahor

North Macedonia

- (North Macedonia) Ivan Trichkovski

Portugal

- (Portugal) Tozé
- (Portugal) Iuri Medeiros

Romania

- (Romania) Ionuț Rada

Senegal

- (Senegal) Ibrahima Touré

Serbia

- (Serbia) Nenad Jestrović

Spain

- (Spain) Álvaro Negredo
- (Spain) Pablo Hernández

Tanzania

- (Tanzania) Sunday Manara

Togo

- (Togo) Mamam Cherif Touré
- (Togo) Mickaël Dogbé
- (Togo) Peniel Mlapa

United Arab Emirates

- (United Arab Emirates) Abdulrahman Mohamed
- (United Arab Emirates) Abdulaziz Mohamed
- (United Arab Emirates) Ahmed Shambih
- (United Arab Emirates) Amer Mubarak
- (United Arab Emirates) Habib Al Fardan
- (United Arab Emirates) Hamdan Al-Kamali
- (United Arab Emirates) Hassan Mubarak
- (United Arab Emirates) Jassem Yaqoub
- (United Arab Emirates) Khalid Ismaïl
- (United Arab Emirates) Khalifa Mubarak
- (United Arab Emirates) Mohammad Khamis
- (United Arab Emirates) Mohamed Omar
- (United Arab Emirates) Salem Saad
- (United Arab Emirates) Tareq Ahmed

== Past managers ==
- (England) Don Revie (1980–84)
- (Brazil) Sebastião Lapola (1983–89)
- (Germany) Reiner Hollmann (1999–00)
- (Brazil) Sebastião Lapola (2000–01)
- (France) René Exbrayat (2003–04)
- (Brazil) Sebastião Lapola (2004)
- (Germany) Hagen Reeck (2004)
- (Germany) Frank Pagelsdorf (Sept 1, 2004–June 30, 2005)
- (Brazil) Vágner Mancini (2005)
- (Germany) Eduard Geyer (Jan 1, 2005–Jan 20, 2006)
- (Germany) Reiner Hollmann (April 3, 2006–Feb 25, 2007)
- (Brazil) Vágner Mancini (May 1, 2007–Dec 1, 2007)
- (Croatia) Luka Bonačić (Jan 17, 2008–Jan 7, 2009)
- (Germany) Frank Pagelsdorf (Jan 8, 2009–Feb 7, 2010)
- (France) Laurent Banide (Feb 24, 2010–May 31, 2010)
- (Brazil) Hélio dos Anjos (June 01, 2010–Oct 10, 2010)
- (United Arab Emirates) Eid Baroot (Oct 13, 2010–Dez 31, 2010)
- (Italy) Walter Zenga (Jan 1, 2011–June 13, 2013)
- (Serbia) Ivan Jovanović (June 18, 2013 – October 29, 2016)
- (Romania) Dan Petrescu (October 29, 2016 – May 26, 2017)
- (Italy) Cesare Prandelli (May 26, 2017 – January 19, 2018)
- (Serbia) Ivan Jovanović (January 19, 2018 – December 2, 2018)
- (Brazil) Caio Zanardi (December 2, 2018 – January 2, 2019)
- (Spain) Beñat San José (January 2, 2019 – May 30, 2019)
- (Brazil) Caio Zanardi (April 1, 2019 – October 14, 2019)
- (Croatia) Krunoslav Jurčić (October 14, 2019 – February 4, 2021)
- (Argentina) Ramón Díaz (February 4, 2021 – February 7, 2022)
- (United Arab Emirates) Salem Rabie (February 8, 2022 – May 19, 2022)
- (Germany) Thorsten Fink (May 19, 2022 – November 5, 2022)
- (Croatia) Goran Tomić (November 5, 2022 – June 5, 2023)
- (Serbia) Goran Tufegdžić (June 5, 2023 – November 6, 2023)
- (Italy) Fabrizio Cammarata (November 7, 2023 – November 27, 2023)
- (Netherlands) Alfred Schreuder (November 27, 2023 – May 24, 2025)
- (Serbia) Slaviša Jokanović (June 8, 2025 – present)

== Pro-League record ==
Season	Lvl.	Tms.	Pos.	President's Cup	League Cup
2008–09	1	12	6th	Round of 16	First Round
2009–10	1	12	10th	Quarter-finals	First Round
2010–11	1	12	3rd	Round of 16	First Round
2011–12	1	12	2nd	Round of 16	First Round
2012–13	1	14	6th	Round of 16	First Round
2013–14	1	14	5th	Semi-finals	First Round
2014–15	1	14	5th	Champions	Champions
2015–16	1	14	4th	Round of 16	First Round
2016–17	1	14	6th	Runner-ups	First Round
2017–18	1	12	4th	Round of 16	Quarter-finals
2018–19	1	14	8th	Quarter-finals	Semi-finals
2019–20^{a}	1	14	6th	Round of 16	Champions
2020–21	1	14	5th	Runner-ups	Runner-ups
2021–22	1	14	8th	Round of 16	Quarter-finals
2022–23	1	14	9th	Round of 16	Semi-Finals
2023–24	1	14	6th	Runner-ups	Quarter-Finals

_{Notes 2019–20 UAE football season was cancelled due to the COVID-19 pandemic in the United Arab Emirates.}

Key

- Pos. = Position
- Tms. = Number of teams
- Lvl. = League

== Other sports ==
Al-Nasr also fields teams in futsal, volleyball, handball, basketball, table tennis, swimming, cycling, athletics, karate, and jujutsu.

== See also ==
- List of football clubs in the United Arab Emirates
