= Gláuber (footballer, born 2000) =

Brazilian footballer

Personal information
- Full name: Gláuber Siqueira dos Santos Lima
- Date of birth: 22 May 2000 (age 26)
- Height: 1.91 m (6 ft 3 in)
- Position: Defender

Team information
- Current team: Al-Nasr
- Number: 4

Youth career
- –2019: Botafogo

Senior career*
Years	Team	Apps	(Gls)
2019–	Al Nasr	126	(6)
- * Club domestic league appearances and goals as of 19:04, 27 October 2023 (UTC)

Gláuber Siqueira dos Santos Lima (born 22 May 2000), commonly known as Gláuber, is a Brazilian footballer who plays for Al-Nasr.

== Career statistics ==
=== Club ===
As of 17 January 2020.

Club	Season	League			Cup		Continental		Other		Total	
Club	Season	Division	Apps	Goals	Apps	Goals	Apps	Goals	Apps	Goals	Apps	Goals
Al-Nasr Dubai	2019–20	UAE Pro League	11	0	6 (Note: Appearances in the UAE League Cup)	1	0	0	0	0	17	1
Career total			11	0	6	1	0	0	0	0	17	1

== Honours ==
Al Nasr

- UAE League Cup: 2019–20
