= Andre Boucaud =

Trinidadian footballer (born 1984)

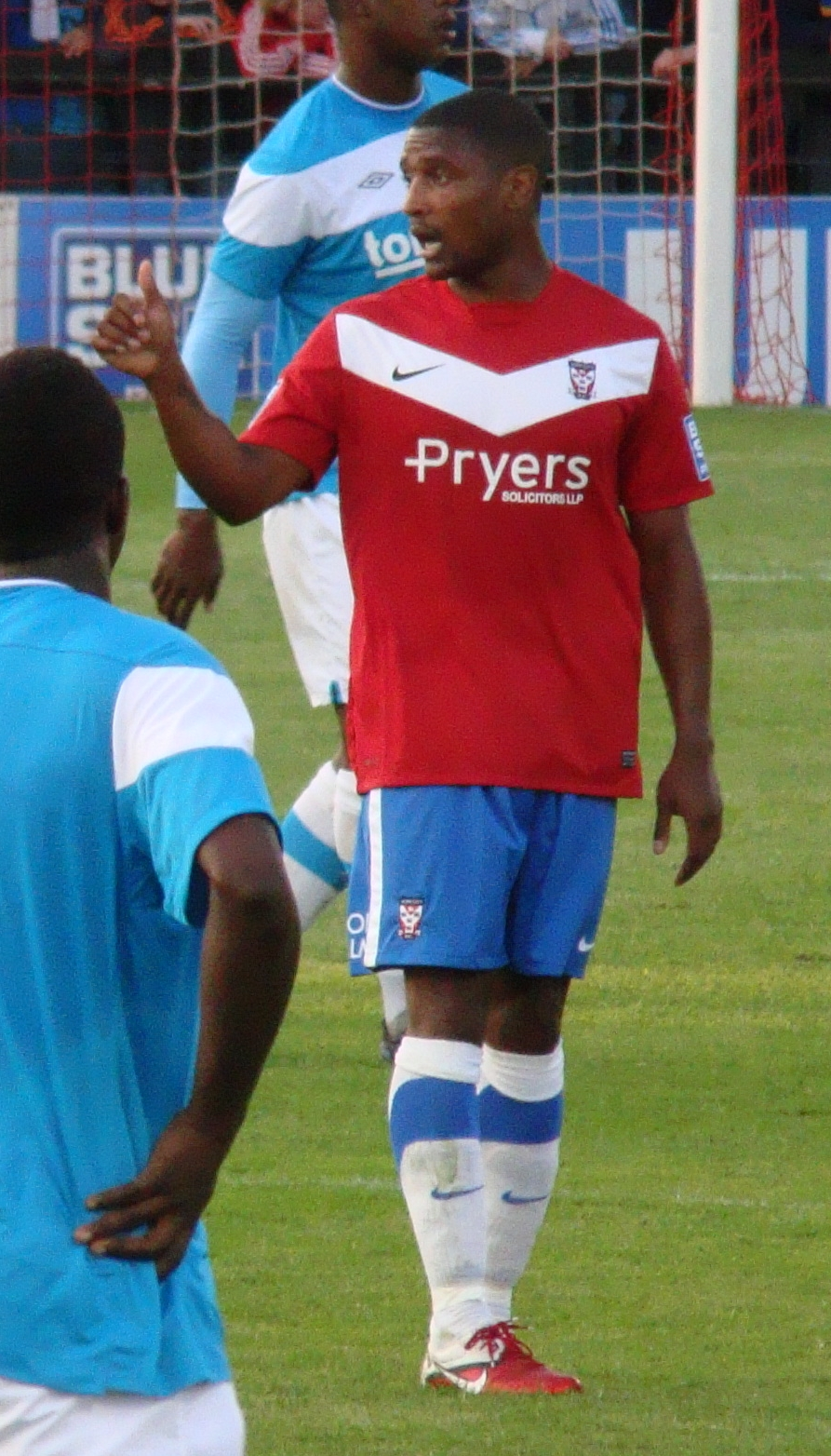
- Boucaud playing for York City in 2011

Personal information
- Full name: Andre Christopher Boucaud
- Date of birth: 10 October 1984 (age 42)
- Place of birth: Enfield, England
- Height: 5 ft 10 in (1.78 m)
- Position: Central midfielder

Youth career
- 2000–2001: Queens Park Rangers
- 2001–2002: Reading

Senior career*
Years	Team	Apps	(Gls)
2002–2004	Reading	0	(0)
2003	→ Peterborough United (loan)	6	(0)
2003	→ Peterborough United (loan)	8	(1)
2004–2006	Peterborough United	25	(1)
2005	→ Aldershot Town (loan)	9	(0)
2006–2007	Kettering Town	39	(4)
2007–2008	Wycombe Wanderers	10	(0)
2008–2011	Kettering Town	98	(0)
2010–2011	→ York City (loan)	2	(0)
2011–2012	York City	41	(1)
2012–2013	Luton Town	7	(0)
2012–2013	→ Notts County (loan)	19	(1)
2013–2014	Notts County	49	(0)
2014–2018	Dagenham & Redbridge	143	(0)
2018–2020	Barnet	23	(0)
2020	Maidstone United	7	(0)

International career^{‡}
2004–2021	Trinidad and Tobago	48	(2)
- * Club domestic league appearances and goals as of 22:35, 17 March 2020 (UTC) ‡ National team caps and goals as of 20:53, 30 March 2021 (UTC)

Andre Christopher Boucaud (born 10 October 1984) is a professional footballer who plays as a central midfielder. He has played in the Football League for Peterborough United, Wycombe Wanderers, Notts County and Dagenham & Redbridge and at senior international level for Trinidad and Tobago.

Boucaud started his career in the youth system at Queens Park Rangers before moving to Reading, with whom he signed a professional contract in 2002. He had two spells on loan with Peterborough United in 2003 and signed for the club permanently in 2004. He had a loan spell with Aldershot Town of the Conference National in 2005 and was released by Peterborough in 2006. Boucaud spent a season with Kettering Town in the Conference North before signing for League Two club Wycombe Wanderers in 2007. He was released after one season and went on to spend two and a half seasons with Kettering after returning in 2008. He left them after signing for York City in 2011, following an initial loan spell at the club. Boucaud signed for Luton Town shortly after a year with York. Less than a year later he joined Notts County on loan, before signing permanently in 2013. In 2014, he signed for League Two club Dagenham & Redbridge after leaving Notts County.

Boucaud has represented Trinidad and Tobago, the homeland of his parents, at international level. He made his debut in 2004 as a substitute against Iraq, with his first start coming against Northern Ireland. He played in three 2006 FIFA World Cup qualifiers for Trinidad.

== Early and personal life ==
Boucaud was born in Enfield, Greater London. While suffering an unknown illness in 2009, it was suspected that Boucaud could have contracted swine flu. His first child was born in 2010.

== Club career ==
=== Early career ===
Boucaud joined the youth system at Queens Park Rangers in 2000 and after the club lost their Academy status he moved to the Reading youth system towards the end of 2001. After breaking into Reading's reserve team, he signed a professional contract with the club on 25 March 2002 that contracted him at the club until June 2004., Boucaud was pursued by Premier League club Arsenal, but stayed with Reading as they gave him a three-year contract. He was loaned out to Second Division club Peterborough United until the end of the 2002–03 season on 27 March 2003 and he made his debut two days later as an 85th minute substitute in a 5–1 victory away to Mansfield Town. He finished the season with six appearances for Peterborough.

Reading agreed to allow Boucaud to rejoin Peterborough on loan in June 2003, and Reading manager Alan Pardew said: "he's done enough to convince me that I shouldn't keep him there for too long". His return to Peterborough was completed on an initial one-month loan on 8 August 2003. His first appearance after returning was in a 4–3 defeat home to Hartlepool United the following day, and in September 2003 Peterborough manager Barry Fry said he wanted to extend Boucaud's stay at the club. Having made nine appearances and scored one goal for Peterborough in two months, he returned to Reading on 7 October 2003.

=== Peterborough United ===
Fry spoke of his desire to re-sign Boucaud, and after Reading released him on 10 May 2004, he re-signed for Peterborough on a two-year contract on 14 May. He made 24 appearances and scored one goal during 2004–05. Boucaud joined Conference National club Aldershot Town on a three-month loan on 16 September 2005. He returned to Peterborough after being recalled from his loan on 15 December 2005, which he finished with 13 appearances. Following his return to the club he was challenged by manager Mark Wright to fight for his place in the team. After failing to figure in Wright's and subsequently Steve Bleasdale's plans, Boucaud was released by Peterborough on 9 May 2006 after his contract was allowed to expire.

=== Kettering Town ===
He signed for Conference North club Kettering Town on 19 May 2006 and made his debut in a 1–0 home victory over Hyde United on 12 August. He stayed with the club for 2006–07 and appeared in both legs of the play-off semi-final against Farsley Celtic, which Kettering lost 4–2 in a penalty shoot-out following a 1–1 draw on aggregate. He made 50 appearances and scored five goals for the club before leaving on 5 June 2007 after new manager Mark Cooper decided against retaining him.

=== Wycombe Wanderers ===
Boucaud joined League Two club Wycombe Wanderers on 8 August 2007 on a one-year contract after impressing during a pre-season trial. His debut came three days later as a 78th-minute substitute in Wycombe's opening day 1–0 defeat at home to Accrington Stanley. This was followed by his first start in a 2–2 draw away to Dagenham & Redbridge the following weekend. He finished 2007–08 with 11 appearances for Wycombe and the club released him on 21 May 2008.

=== Return to Kettering Town ===
He rejoined Kettering, by this time in the Conference Premier, on 5 August 2008 on a one-year contract. He played for Kettering when they were defeated 4–2 by Premier League team Fulham in the FA Cup fourth round on 24 January 2009, and was named man of the match by the Daily Mirror, who reported that Boucaud "ran the midfield". Manager Cooper said in February 2009 he believed Boucaud was set "for greater things" after his performances during 2008–09. He finished the season with 55 appearances and Kettering took up an option to extend his contract in May 2009. He played a part when Kettering reached the FA Cup second round in 2009–10, playing in a 1–1 home draw with League One team Leeds United and in the 5–1 away defeat in the replay. This season saw Boucaud make 41 appearances.

Boucaud committed his future to Kettering after signing a new two-year contract with the club in May 2010. He made his first appearance of 2010–11 in a 0–0 draw away to Gateshead on 14 August 2010. He was handed the captaincy in October 2010 following the appointment of Marcus Law as manager.

=== York City ===
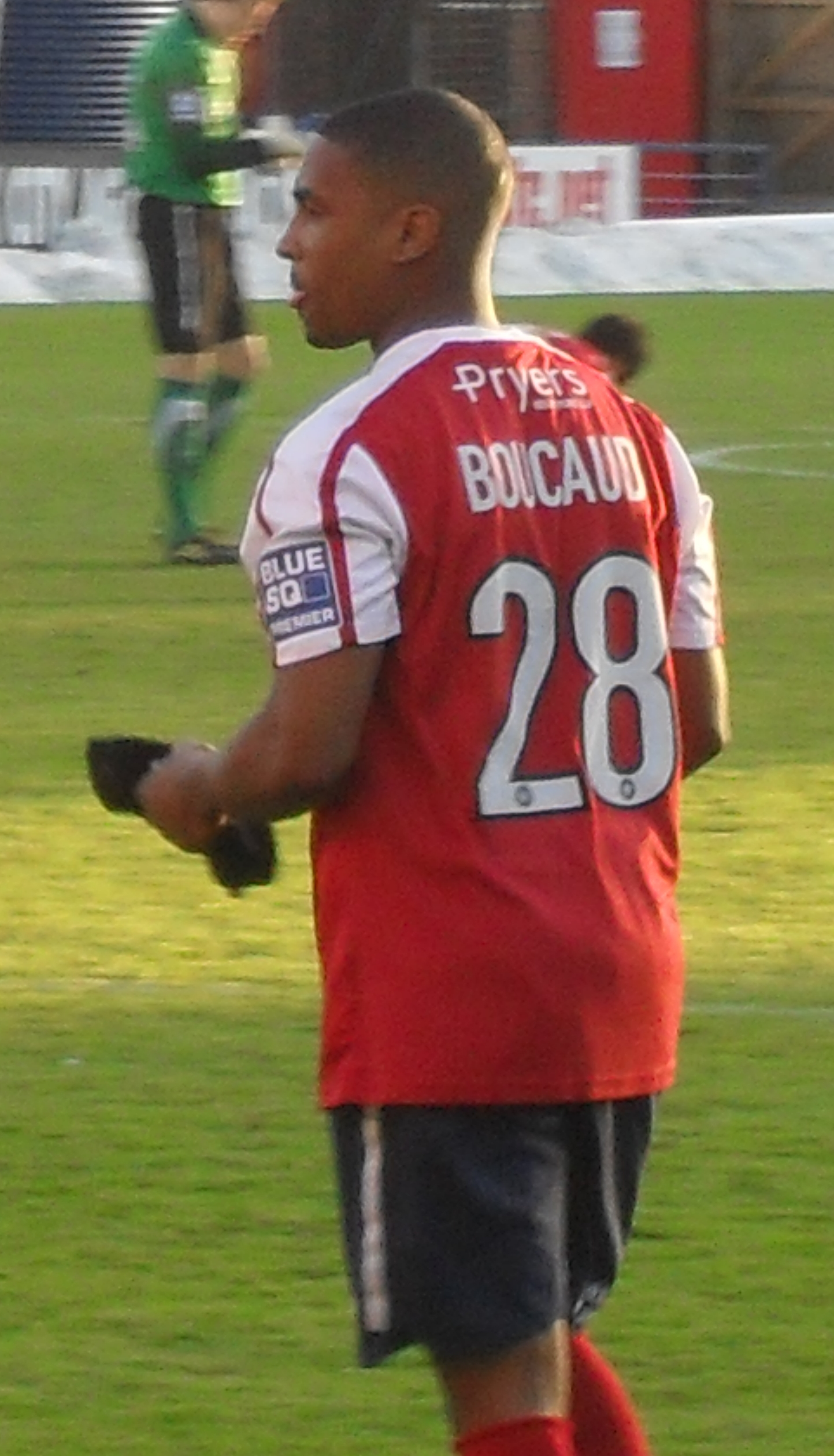
Boucaud playing for York City in 2010

After Kettering chairman Imraan Ladak decided to reduce the club's wage bill, on 26 November 2010, Boucaud joined their Conference Premier rivals York City on loan until January 2011, with a view to a permanent transfer. He had made 21 appearances for Kettering up to that point in 2010–11. His debut for York came as a 76th-minute substitute in a 0–0 draw away to Kidderminster Harriers on 30 November 2010, which was followed by his first start and home debut in a 1–0 defeat to Conference North team Boston United in the FA Trophy first round on 11 December. Boucaud signed for York permanently for a fee of £20,000 on 5 January 2011 on a two-and-a-half-year contract that would expire in June 2013. His first appearance after signing permanently came when starting in a 1–0 home win over Grimsby Town on 11 January 2011. He finished the season with 20 York appearances.

Boucaud scored his first goal for York with a 12-yard shot into the bottom corner in a 5–1 victory away to Kettering on 23 August 2011. He was handed a three-match suspension after being red carded during a 0–0 draw away to Barrow on 19 November 2011 after being adjudged by the referee to have raised his arms during the melee following the sending off of teammate Jason Walker during stoppage time. York's Conference Premier rivals Fleetwood Town made an offer for Boucaud during January 2012, which was rejected by manager Gary Mills.

=== Luton Town ===
Boucaud signed for York's Conference Premier rivals Luton Town on 31 January 2012 on a one-and-a-half-year contract for a £25,000 fee. He played in six matches before falling out of favour with new Luton manager Paul Buckle, who used Boucaud in just one match as a substitute.

=== Notts County ===
During pre-season for 2012–13, Buckle stated that: "[Boucaud]'s not in our plans, he knows that." On 1 August 2012, Boucaud joined League One club Notts County on loan until January 2013. He made his debut for Notts County in a 2–0 home victory over Hartlepool on 21 August 2012, winning the man of the match award with what was described as an "assured performance ... knitting play together well with short, sharp passes". Boucaud scored his first goal for the club in a 2–1 away victory over Coventry City on 20 October 2012, with a shot from 25 yards. It was also his first Football League goal in eight years. He signed for Notts County permanently on 10 January 2013 on a one-and-a-half-year contract for an undisclosed fee. Boucaud completed 2012–13 with 43 appearances and one goal for Notts County. However, he fell out of favour under Shaun Derry and was released in May 2014 having made 33 appearances in 2013–14.

=== Dagenham & Redbridge ===
In July 2014, he joined League Two club Dagenham & Redbridge on trial, and impressed in the pre-season before signing a one-year contract on 7 August. He made his debut two days later in a 3–0 home defeat to Morecambe on the opening day of 2014–15. His first goal followed in an EFL Cup game against Brentford which finished 6-6, but Brentford won on penalties.

=== Later career ===
Boucaud signed for newly relegated National League club Barnet on 28 June 2018 on a two-year contract for an undisclosed fee. He left Barnet on 9 January 2020 before signing for National League South club Maidstone United on 17 January, making seven appearances before leaving the club at the end of the season.

== International career ==
Although born in England, Boucaud qualifies to play for Trinidad and Tobago through his parents, with his father born in Port of Spain and his mother born in Princes Town. Aged 19, his international debut came as a 61st-minute substitute in a 2–0 friendly victory over Iraq at the Hawthorns on 23 May 2004. A week later, he played in a 4–1 away defeat against Scotland on 30 May 2004, in which he forced goalkeeper Craig Gordon into making a save from a powerful shot. His first start for Trinidad was in a 3–0 home defeat to Northern Ireland on 6 June 2004. He played in three 2006 FIFA World Cup qualifiers for Trinidad, playing against Saint Kitts and Nevis once and Mexico twice.

Boucaud was called up by Trinidad for the first time since 2004 for a friendly against Haiti on 10 August 2011, although the match was postponed due to a lack of funds. This was followed by a call-up for Trinidad's 2014 FIFA World Cup qualifiers against Bermuda and Barbados. He was named on the bench for both of these matches. Boucaud was not capped again until 4 June 2013, when he started in Trinidad's 4–0 friendly defeat away to Romania. He scored his first international goal in a 3–1 win over Saudi Arabia at the King Fahd International Stadium in the 2013 OSN Cup on 9 September 2013.

== Style of play ==
Boucaud is primarily a central midfielder and can also play in attacking and defensive midfield positions. He is described as a "stylish player with a deft touch" who has "the ability to create chances as well as provide a shield to the [defence]". He describes himself as "a player who loves football, I like to get it down and pass". After signing for Wycombe in 2007, he was described by manager Paul Lambert as a "gritty competitor who is also very good on the ball".

== Career statistics ==
=== Club ===
As of match played 14 March 2020

Appearances and goals by club, season and competition
Club	Season	League			FA Cup		League Cup		Other		Total	
Club	Season	Division	Apps	Goals	Apps	Goals	Apps	Goals	Apps	Goals	Apps	Goals
Reading	2002–03	First Division	0	0	0	0	0	0	0	0	0	0
Reading	2003–04	First Division	0	0	0	0	—		—		0	0
Reading	Total		0	0	0	0	0	0	0	0	0	0
Peterborough United (loan)	2002–03	Second Division	6	0	—		—		—		6	0
Peterborough United (loan)	2003–04	Second Division	8	1	—		1	0	—		9	1
Peterborough United	2004–05	League One	22	1	1	0	0	0	1 (Note: Appearance(s) in Football League Trophy)	0	24	1
Peterborough United	2005–06	League Two	3	0	—		0	0	—		3	0
Peterborough United	Total		39	2	1	0	1	0	1	0	42	2
Aldershot Town (loan)	2005–06	Conference National	9	0	2	0	—		2 (Note: One appearance in Football League Trophy, one in Hampshire Senior Cup)	0	13	0
Kettering Town	2006–07	Conference North	39	4	4	0	—		7 (Note: Five appearances and one goal in FA Trophy, two appearances in Conference North play-offs)	1	50	5
Wycombe Wanderers	2007–08	League Two	10	0	0	0	0	0	1	0	11	0
Kettering Town	2008–09	Conference Premier	42	0	7	0	—		6 (Note: Two appearances in Conference League Cup, four in FA Trophy)	0	55	0
Kettering Town	2009–10	Conference Premier	36	0	4	0	—		1 (Note: Appearance(s) in FA Trophy)	0	41	0
Kettering Town	2010–11	Conference Premier	20	0	1	0	—		—		21	0
Kettering Town	Total		98	0	12	0	—		7	0	117	0
York City	2010–11	Conference Premier	19	0	—		—		1	0	20	0
York City	2011–12	Conference Premier	24	1	0	0	—		1	0	25	1
York City	Total		43	1	0	0	—		2	0	45	1
Luton Town	2011–12	Conference Premier	7	0	—		—		0	0	7	0
Notts County	2012–13	League One	39	1	2	0	0	0	2	0	43	1
Notts County	2013–14	League One	29	0	1	0	2	0	1	0	33	0
Notts County	Total		68	1	3	0	2	0	3	0	76	1
Dagenham & Redbridge	2014–15	League Two	41	0	1	0	1	1	0	0	43	1
Dagenham & Redbridge	2015–16	League Two	25	0	2	0	1	0	0	0	28	0
Dagenham & Redbridge	2016–17	National League	36	0	2	0	—		3 (Note: One appearance in FA Trophy, two in National League play-offs)	0	41	0
Dagenham & Redbridge	2017–18	National League	41	0	2	0	—		1	0	44	0
Dagenham & Redbridge	Total		143	0	7	0	2	1	4	0	156	1
Barnet	2018–19	National League	16	0	2	0	—		3	0	21	0
Barnet	2019–20	National League	7	0	2	0	—		0	0	9	0
Barnet	Total		23	0	4	0	—		3	0	30	0
Maidstone United	2019–20	National League South	7	0	—		—		—		7	0
Career total			486	8	33	0	5	1	30	1	554	10

=== International ===
As of match played 28 March 2021

Appearances and goals by national team and year
National team	Year	Apps	Goals
Trinidad and Tobago	2004	6	0
Trinidad and Tobago	2013	9	1
Trinidad and Tobago	2014	8	0
Trinidad and Tobago	2015	10	1
Trinidad and Tobago	2016	11	0
Trinidad and Tobago	2017	3	0
Trinidad and Tobago	2021	1	0
Total		48	2

As of match played 28 March 2017. Trinidad and Tobago score listed first, score column indicates score after each Boucaud goal.

List of international goals scored by Andre Boucaud
No.	Date	Venue	Cap	Opponent	Score	Result	Competition	Ref.
1	9 September 2013	King Fahd International Stadium, Riyadh, Saudi Arabia	12	Saudi Arabia	3–1	3–1	2013 OSN Cup	
2	12 July 2015	University of Phoenix Stadium, Glendale, United States	27	Cuba	2–0	2–0	2015 CONCACAF Gold Cup	
