= 2013 OSN Cup =

Tournament details
- Host country: Saudi Arabia
- Dates: 5–9 September 2013
- Teams: 4 (from 3 sub-confederations)
- Venue: 1 (in 1 host city)

Final positions
- Champions: United Arab Emirates
- Runners-up: New Zealand
- Third place: Trinidad and Tobago
- Fourth place: Saudi Arabia

Tournament statistics
- Matches played: 4
- Goals scored: 13 (3.25 per match)
- Top scorer(s): (Trinidad and Tobago) Kenwyne Jones (3 goals)
- Best player: (United Arab Emirates) Omar Abdulrahman
- Best goalkeeper: (New Zealand) Glen Moss

The 2013 OSN Cup was an association football tournament held in Riyadh, Saudi Arabia from 5 September 2013 to 9 September 2013. The tournament was organized by the Saudi Arabian Football Federation and sponsored by the Middle Eastern and North African TV network OSN. This was the premier edition of the tournament. New Zealand, Saudi Arabia, Trinidad and Tobago and the United Arab Emirates were invited to the tournament. All matches were held at the King Fahd International Stadium About the tournament, SAFF president Ahmed Eid Al-Harbi said, "Our goal is to promote the culture of football in the Kingdom, set more platforms for our talented team to demonstrate their skills and to encourage new talent to step forward and be proud participants in Saudi Arabia’s modern football history." The United Arab Emirates were crowned champions after defeating New Zealand 2–0 in the final.

== Brackets ==
Semi-finals
5 September
UAE (pen.)	3 (7)
Trinidad and Tobago	3 (6)
5 September
Saudi Arabia	0
New Zealand	1

Final
9 September
UAE	2
New Zealand	0
Third place
9 September
Trinidad and Tobago	3
Saudi Arabia	1

== Semi-finals ==
5 September 2013
18:00 UTC+3

United Arab Emirates	3–3	Trinidad and Tobago
Fardan 5'; Mabkhout 37'; Khalil 54'	Report	Plaza 55'; Jones 87' (pen.); Molino 90+2'
Penalties
	7–6

King Fahd International Stadium, Riyadh
Referee: Fahad Al Oraini (Saudi Arabia)
5 September 2013
21:45 UTC+3

Saudi Arabia	0–1	New Zealand
	Report	Killen 78'

King Fahd International Stadium, Riyadh
Referee: Abdulameer Abdulshaheed (Bahrain

== Third place play-off ==
9 September 2013
18:00 UTC+3

Trinidad and Tobago	3–1	Saudi Arabia
Jones 4', 5'; Boucaud 85'	Report	Hazazi 47'

King Fahd International Stadium, Riyadh
Referee: Fahad Al-Oraini (Saudi Arabia)

== Final ==
9 September 2013
21:45 UTC+3

United Arab Emirates	2–0	New Zealand
Khalil 11'; Mabkhout 56'	Report

King Fahd International Stadium, Riyadh

== Goalscorers ==
3 goals

- (Trinidad and Tobago) Kenwyne Jones

2 goals

- (United Arab Emirates) Ahmed Khalil
- (United Arab Emirates) Ali Mabkhout

1 goal

- (Saudi Arabia) Naif Hazazi
- (New Zealand) Chris Killen
- (Trinidad and Tobago) Andre Boucaud
- (Trinidad and Tobago) Kevin Molino
- (Trinidad and Tobago) Willis Plaza
- (United Arab Emirates) Habib Fardan
