= 2010–11 Notts County F.C. season =

Notts County
2010–11 season
- Chairman: Ray Trew
- Manager: Craig Short (until 26 October); Paul Ince (until 3 April); Martin Allen (from 11 April)
- Stadium: Meadow Lane
- League One: 19th
- FA Cup: Fourth round
- League Cup: Third round
- Football League Trophy: First round
- Top goalscorer: League: Lee Hughes (13); All: Lee Hughes (16)
- Highest home attendance: 11,355 (vs Sheffield Wednesday, 2 October 2010)
- Lowest home attendance: 3,235 (vs Gateshead, 6 November 2010)
- Average home league attendance: 7,776
Home colours	Away colours

Notts County are the oldest club in the Football League and the 2010–11 season was their 122nd year in The Football League. After a successful season in League Two, the club gained promotion to League One following a win against Morecambe on 17 April 2010 and were crowned as League Two champions after a 5–0 win at already relegated Darlington ten days later. Manager Steve Cotterill left the club at the end of the season, and was replaced by Craig Short. Short was sacked on 26 October 2010, and replaced by Paul Ince. Ince left the club in April 2011, and was replaced by Martin Allen.

== Season review ==
=== Kits ===
Nike continues as the shirt designer and Lorien Connect is the new shirt sponsor. Nike have gone for another traditional Notts County style shirt, with black and white stripes, however the arm only contains one strip which is on the underside of the kit. The Shirt Sponsor is given an aqua blue and burgundy colouring whilst the Nike logo is red. The home shirt worn during the FA Cup 4th Round game on 29/01/2011 had a bet365 logo.

=== Events ===
- 4 June 2010 – Craig Short is named as manager of Notts County, he signed a three-year contract.
- 1 July 2010 – Lee Hughes signs a new deal to keep up at the club till 2012.
- 5 July 2010 – Neal Bishop signs a new two-year deal keeping him at Meadow Lane till 2012.
- 7 July 2010 – Notts County are cleared by HM Revenue & Customs. They have now paid all money owed to HMRC.
- 9 July 2010 – Notts County take former Huddersfield Town defender Krystian Pearce on trial and he will travel to Austria with the team.
- 19 July 2010 – Nottingham council say they will assess the capacity of Meadow Lane.
- 23 July 2010 – Carl Heggs is appointed as new chief scout.
- 29 July 2010 – The Co-Operative Motor Group has signed a one-year agreement to become official partners of Notts County, also becoming car suppliers for the club.
- 26 October 2010 – Notts County sack Craig Short and Dave Kevan.
- 28 October 2010 – Former Milton Keynes Dons and Blackburn Rovers manager, Paul Ince is appointed manager.
- 29 October 2010 – Alex Rae is appointed as assistant manager.
- 9 November 2010 – Coach Tommy Johnson leaves Notts County.
- 3 April 2011 – Paul Ince resigns as manager, after losing 5 games in a row. Carl Heggs is installed as caretaker manager.
- 11 April 2011 – Barnet manager, Martin Allen becomes new manager of Notts County.

=== Pre-season ===
In their first week of pre-season, Notts County travelled to Austria to play SV Austria Salzburg, who they beat 2–1. Graeme Lee scored in the eight minute with Ben Davies claiming the assist. New signing Ben Burgess could have them put them 2–0 up but hit it wide, then Lee Hughes hit the cross bar. At half-time Luke Rodgers, Karl Hawley and new keeper Stuart Nelson came on to replace Hughes, Burgess and new no.1 Rob Burch. 27 seconds later County were 2–0 up with Luke Rodgers scoring. In the 50th minute Wührer scored for Salzburg. Five trialist came on including Krystian Pearce and Mansour Assoumani also new signing John Spicer made his debut. Notts County continued their tour of Austria, playing Polish team Arka Gdynia, Denis Glavina scored just before half-time to give the Polish team the lead and the win. Notts County's first home pre-season game was against Premier League outfit Stoke City, the final score was 0–0 with the Magpies impressing the home crowd. Notts County impressed again at Meadow Lane with a 2–1 win over Championship outfit Cardiff City, Lee Hughes scored a double before the break to put County 2–0 up and near the hour mark Scottish international, Ross McCormack pulled one back for the Bluebirds. Notts County put up a hard performance against Championship side Sheffield United, United took the lead in the 87th minute through a Ched Evans strike.

=== League One ===
Notts County begin their League One season with 3–0 defeats to both Huddersfield Town and Oldham Athletic, keeping them bottom of the table. County notched their first league win of the season against newly promoted Dagenham & Redbridge, and followed it with a hard-fought 3–3 away draw against Bournemouth. The next home league game marked the Meadow Lane centenary, and the team won 4–0 against Yeovil Town. Notts lost their next match to Charlton Athletic, 1–0, with the Addicks scoring the winning goal in the final five minutes, but responded with a 3–2 win over Leyton Orient at home. After losing their next league match 2–1 at Bristol Rovers, County recorded a midweek 3–2 away win against Peterborough United in a bad-tempered affair which saw players and officials involved in a fracas on the pitch. The following Saturday, Notts lost 2–0 at home to Sheffield Wednesday and had a player dismissed for the third consecutive league game. Carlisle United were the next side to defeat County. Bouncing back with a win over Plymouth Argyle and then consecutive losses to Colchester United and Southampton. Exeter City and Tranmere Rovers extended Notts County's losing run to 4 games before Lee Hughes scored the only goal in a win over Swindon Town. Notts County had their game with Brentford called off because of a frozen pitch. However, their luck had changed the following game, beating Milton Keynes Dons 2–0, this was followed by a 1–1 draw with Plymouth and consecutive wins against Walsall and Hartlepool United. Southampton then drew with Notts County, this was followed by 1–0 defeat to Carlisle United and 1–1 draws with Hartlepool United and Walsall. Exeter beat Notts County 2–0 and then Colchester United lost 2–0 to County, this was followed with a win over Charlton Athletic and a draw against Brentford. Two defeats by two promotion candidates, Leyton Orient and Peterborough United, followed before bouncing back with a 1–0 win over Sheffield Wednesday. County then suffered three consecutive 1–0 defeats to the hands of Rochdale, Bristol Rovers and league-leaders Brighton & Hove Albion. Defeats against Huddersfield Town, Oldham Athletic. Rochdale, Dagenham & Rebridge, Yeovil Town and Bournemouth all followed. Notts County finally ended their club-record nine game losing streak in the league when they beat fellow strugglers Tranmere Rovers 1–0 away. This was followed by a 2–1 win over Swindon Town, where County had to come back from one goal down. A draw with Brentford meant that the team were still not safe from relegation to League Two, and County failed again to secure safety after a 2–1 defeat to Milton Keynes Dons. They did however secure their league one safety on the final day of the season thanks to a 1–1 draw at home to league one champions Brighton & Hove Albion

==== Standings ====
Pos	Club	Pld	W	D	L	F	A	GD	Pts
18	Hartlepool United	45	15	11	19	48	65	−18	56
19	Notts County	45	14	7	24	45	59	-14	49
20	Walsall	45	12	12	21	55	72	−17	48

Pld = Matches played; W = Matches won; D = Matches drawn; L = Matches lost; F = Goals for; A = Goals against; GD = Goal difference; Pts = Points

Last updated: 4 May 2011.

==== Results summary ====
Overall								Home						Away					
Pld	W	D	L	GF	GA	GD	Pts	W	D	L	GF	GA	GD	W	D	L	GF	GA	GD
46	14	8	24	46	60	−14	50	9	3	11	24	25	−1	5	5	13	22	35	−13

Last updated: 4 May 2011.

==== Result Round by Round ====
Round	1	2	3	4	5	6	7	8	9	10	11	12	13	14	15	16	17	18	19	20	21	22	23	24	25	26	27	28	29	30	31	32	33	34	35	36	37	38	39	40	41	42	43	44	45	46
Ground	H	A	H	A	H	A	H	A	A	H	A	H	A	H	A	H	H	H	A	A	H	A	H	A	H	H	H	H	A	A	H	A	A	H	A	A	H	H	A	A	H	A	A	H	A	H
Result	L	L	W	D	W	L	W	L	W	L	L	W	L	L	L	L	W	W	D	W	W	D	L	D	D	L	W	W	D	L	L	W	L	L	L	L	L	L	L	L	L	W	W	D	L	D
Position	24	24	16	18	12	13	12	15	10	14	17	13	16	19	21	21	21	19	18	16	13	16	18	18	18	20	18	17	17	17	17	17	17	17	17	18	19	19	21	22	22	19	19	19	19	19

Updated to match(es) played on 4 May 2011. Source: nottscountyfc.co.uk
A = Away; H = Home; W = Win; D = Draw; L = Loss

=== FA Cup ===
Notts County began their campaign against non-league side Gateshead, which they won 2–0 sending them through to the 2nd round. Notts County were drawn against League One rivals Bournemouth, however the fixture was postponed twice due to the weather, but it finally took place on 14 December, where County won 3–1. This was followed by a 2–1 over Premier League side Sunderland. They were drawn against another Premier League, this time it was big spender Manchester City at Meadow Lane, the final result was 1–1, resulting in a replay at the City of Manchester Stadium where they were defeated 5–0.

=== League Cup ===
Notts County were drawn away to Plymouth Argyle in the first round, with John Spicer getting the only goal of the game to put County through to round two. Notts beat Watford 2–1 away in the second round but were knocked out of the tournament after losing 4–2 after extra time away at Wolves in round three.

== Squad ==
Note: Flags indicate national team as defined under FIFA eligibility rules; some limited exceptions apply. Players may hold more than one non-FIFA nationality.

No.	Pos.	Nation	Player
1	GK	ENG	Rob Burch
2	DF	ENG	Stephen Darby (on loan from Liverpool)
3	DF	IRL	Conor Clifford (on loan from Chelsea)
4	DF	ENG	Mike Edwards (captain)
5	DF	ENG	Graeme Lee
6	DF	IRL	John Thompson
7	FW	SCO	Kevin Smith
8	MF	ENG	Ricky Ravenhill
9	FW	ENG	Lee Hughes
10	MF	ENG	Neal Bishop
11	MF	SCO	Kevin McDonald (on loan from Burnley)
12	DF	ENG	Krystian Pearce
14	DF	ENG	Liam Chilvers
15	FW	ENG	Karl Hawley

No.	Pos.	Nation	Player
16	MF	ENG	Lewis Gobern
17	GK	ENG	Stuart Nelson
18	DF	ENG	Stephen Hunt (on loan to Lincoln City)
19	FW	SCO	Alan Gow
20	FW	ENG	Craig Westcarr
21	MF	ENG	Dave Martin (on loan from Derby County)
22	MF	IRL	Alan Judge
23	GK	HUN	Dávid Gróf
24	DF	ENG	Carl Regan (on loan from Bristol Rovers)
25	MF	ENG	John Spicer
26	MF	ENG	Jon Harley
27	FW	IRL	Ben Burgess
28	DF	NGA	Sam Sodje
29	FW	ENG	Febian Brandy
30	MF	NIR	Ivan Sproule (on loan from Bristol City)
37	FW	GAM	Njogu Demba-Nyrén
39	MF	ENG	Matt Marshall
44	GK	ENG	Liam Mitchell

=== Statistics ===
As of end of season

No.	Pos	Nat	Player	Total		League One		FA Cup		League Cup		FL Trophy	
No.	Pos	Nat	Player	Apps	Goals	Apps	Goals	Apps	Goals	Apps	Goals	Apps	Goals
1	GK	(England) ENG	Rob Burch	19	0	14+1	0	2	0	1	0	1	0
2	DF	(England) ENG	Stephen Darby	25	0	23	0	2	0	0	0	0	0
3	DF	(Republic of Ireland) IRL	Conor Clifford*	9	0	5+4	0	0	0	0	0	0	0
4	DF	(England) ENG	Mike Edwards	45	1	36+1	1	5	0	1+1	0	1	0
5	DF	(England) ENG	Graeme Lee	19	0	14+4	0	0	0	1	0	0	0
6	DF	(Republic of Ireland) IRL	John Thompson	30	0	23+2	0	1+1	0	2	0	1	0
7	FW	(Scotland) SCO	Kevin Smith	17	3	6+7	1	0	0	1+2	2	1	0
8	MF	(England) ENG	Ricky Ravenhill	42	0	31+3	0	5	0	2	0	1	0
9	FW	(England) ENG	Lee Hughes	37	16	24+7	13	5	2	1	1	0	0
10	MF	(England) ENG	Neal Bishop	51	2	42+1	1	4+1	1	3	0	0	0
11	MF	(Scotland) SCO	Kevin McDonald	11	0	10+1	0	0	0	0	0	0	0
12	DF	(England) ENG	Krystian Pearce	35	2	26+1	1	4	1	3	0	0+1	0
14	DF	(England) ENG	Liam Chilvers	27	0	17+4	0	1+1	0	3	0	1	0
15	FW	(England) ENG	Karl Hawley	29	1	12+12	1	2+2	0	0	0	0+1	0
16	MF	(England) ENG	Lewis Gobern	6	0	0+5	0	0+1	0	0	0	0	0
17	GK	(England) ENG	Stuart Nelson	38	0	32+1	0	3	0	2	0	0	0
18	DF	(England) ENG	Stephen Hunt	9	0	3+1	0	1+2	0	1+1	0	0	0}
19	FW	(England) ENG	Luke Rodgers*	5	1	0+4	0	0+1	1	0	0	0	0
19	FW	(Scotland) SCO	Alan Gow	18	1	12+4	1	2	0	0	0	0	0
20	FW	(England) ENG	Craig Westcarr	49	13	36+5	12	4	1	2+1	0	0+1	0
21	FW	(England) ENG	Jake Jervis*	14	0	1+9	0	0	0	1+2	0	1	0
21	MF	(England) ENG	Dave Martin	11	0	7+3	0	1	0	0	0	0	0
22	MF	(England) ENG	Ben Davies*	29	8	22	5	3	1	3	1	1	1
22	MF	(Republic of Ireland) IRL	Alan Judge	21	1	17+2	1	1	0	1	0	0	0
23	GK	(Hungary) HUN	Dávid Gróf	0	0	0	0	0	0	0	0	0	0
24	FW	(England) ENG	Tom Ince*	8	2	3+3	2	2	0	0	0	0	0
24	DF	(England) ENG	Carl Regan	4	0	4	0	0	0	0	0	0	0
25	MF	(England) ENG	John Spicer	27	3	15+8	2	1	0	2	1	1	0
26	DF	(England) ENG	Jon Harley	47	0	39	0	4	0	2+1	0	1	0
27	FW	(England) ENG	Ben Burgess	18	1	8+9	1	0	0	1	0	0	0
28	DF	(Nigeria) NGA	Sam Sodje	12	0	5+6	0	0+1	0	0	0	0	0
29	FW	(Scotland) SCO	Lee Miller*	7	2	5+1	2	0+1	0	0	0	0	0
29	FW	(England) ENG	Febian Brandy	9	0	5+4	0	0	0	0	0	0	0
30	MF	(England) ENG	Michael Woods*	2	0	0	0	0+2	0	0	0	0	0
30	MF	(Northern Ireland) NIR	Ivan Sproule	5	0	4+1	0	0	0	0	0	0	0
37	FW	(The Gambia) GAM	Njogu Demba-Nyrén	12	1	5+7	1	0	0	0	0	0	0
38	FW	(England) ENG	Jake Wholey	1	0	0+1	0	0	0	0	0	0	0
39	MF	(England) ENG	Matt Marshall	0	0	0	0	0	0	0	0	0	0
	MF	(England) ENG	Luke Hubbins*	2	0	0	0	0	0	1	0	1	0

- *Indicates player left during the season

=== Disciplinary record ===
N	P	Name	League One		FA Cup		League Cup		FL Trophy	
N	P	Name	Booked	Sent off (straight red)	Booked	Sent off (straight red)	Booked	Sent off (straight red)	Booked	Sent off (straight red)
2	DF	Darby	1	0	0	0	0	0	0	0
4	DF	Edwards	5	2	1	0	0	0	0	0
5	DF	Lee	2	2	0	0	0	0	0	0
6	DF	Thompson	4	1	0	0	0	0	0	0
7	FW	Smith	3	0	0	0	0	0	0	0
8	MF	Ravehill	9	2	1	0	1	0	0	0
9	FW	Hughes	11	0	0	0	1	0	0	0
10	MF	Bishop	9	0	2	0	1	0	0	0
	MF	Davies	1	0	0	0	2	0	0	0
11	MF	McDonald	2	0	0	0	0	0	0	0
12	DF	Pearce	5	0	0	0	0	1	1	0
14	DF	Chilvers	5	0	0	0	0	1	0	0
15	FW	Hawley	0	0	1	0	0	0	0	0
16	MF	Hubbins	1	0	0	0	0	0	0	0
17	GK	Stuart Nelson	1	0	1	0	0	0	0	0
20	FW	Westcarr	3	0	0	0	0	0	0	0
	FW	Jervis	0	0	0	0	1	0	0	0
22	MF	Judge	1	1	0	0	0	0	0	0
24	DF	Regan	1	0	0	0	0	0	0	0
25	MF	Spicer	2	0	0	0	1	0	0	0
26	DF	Harley	10	1	1	0	0	0	1	0
28	DF	Sodje	3	0	0	0	0	0	0	0
30	MF	Sproule	1	0	0	0	0	0	0	0
37	FW	Demba-Nyrén	2	0	0	0	0	0	0	0

== Transfers ==
=== In ===
No.	Pos.	Nat.	Name	Age	EU	Moving from	Type	Transfer window	Ends	Transfer fee	Source
1	GK	(England)	Burch	26	EU	Lincoln City	Transfer	Summer	2012	Free	
17	GK	(England)	Nelson	28	EU	Aberdeen (Scotland)	Transfer	Summer	2012	Free	
27	FW	(England)	Burgess	28	EU	Blackpool	Transfer	Summer	2012	Free	
25	MF	(England)	Spicer	26	EU	Doncaster Rovers	Transfer	Summer	2012	Free	
26	DF	(England)	Harley	30	EU	Watford	Transfer	Summer	2012	Free	
14	DF	(England)	Chivlers	28	EU	Preston North End	Free Agent	Summer	2012	Free	
23	GK	(Hungary)	Gróf	21	EU	Hibernian (Scotland)	Free Agent	Summer	2011	Free	
12	DF	(England)	Pearce	20	EU	Huddersfield Town	Free Agent	Summer	2011	Free	
39	MF	(England)	Marshall	18	EU	Elche (Spain)	Free Agent	Summer	2011	Free	
7	FW	(Scotland)	Smith	23	EU	Dundee United (Scotland)	Free Agent	Summer	2011	Free	
28	DF	(Nigeria)	Sodje	31	EU		Free Agent		2012	Free	
22	MF	(Republic of Ireland)	Judge	22	EU	Blackburn Rovers	Transfer	Winter	2013	Undisclosed	
16	MF	(England)	Gobern	25	EU	Grimsby Town	Free Agent	Winter	2011	Free	
19	FW	(Scotland)	Gow	28	EU	Motherwell (Scotland)	Free Agent	Winter	2011	Free	
29	FW	(England)	Brandy	22	EU		Free Agent		2011	Free	
37	FW	(The Gambia)	Demba-Nyrén	31	EU		Free Agent		2011	Free	

=== Loans in ===
No.	Pos.	Name	Country	Age	Loan club	Started	Ended	Start source	End source
21	FW	Jervis	(England)	34	Birmingham City	5 Aug			
16	MF	Hubbins	(England)	34	Birmingham City	21 Aug	18 Jan		
22	MF	Judge	(Republic of Ireland)	21	Blackburn Rovers	31 Aug	14 Jan		
2	DF	Darby	(England)	37	Liverpool	1 Nov			
24	FW	Ince	(England)	34	Liverpool	1 Nov			
29	FW	Miller	(Scotland)	43	Middlesbrough	19 Nov	7 Jan		
30	MF	Woods	(England)	36	Chelsea	25 Nov			
2	DF	Darby	(England)	37	Liverpool	21 Jan			
21	MF	Martin	(England)	25	Derby County	21 Jan	24 Apr		
3	DF	Clifford	(Republic of Ireland)	19	Chelsea	11 Feb	7 Apr		
11	MF	McDonald	(Scotland)	37	Burnley	11 Feb			
24	DF	Regan	(England)	45	Bristol Rovers	23 Feb			
30	MF	Sproule	(Northern Ireland)	45	Bristol City	4 Mar			

Sources: For loan start source see "Start source". For loan end source see "End source".
EU = if holds or not a European Union passport; Country: when 2 flags, 1st flag = country that plays for internationally, 2nd flag = country of birth; No. = number on jersey; P = Position (for position name, pause mouse pointer on abbreviation); Name = Name on jersey (for more extensive name, pause mouse pointer on name); In/Out = In: The player came in on loan, Out: The player went out on loan; Loan club = the club that the player moved on loan to or the club that the player came from on loan; Started = the date when the player's loan started; Ended = the date when the player's loan ended.

=== Out ===
No.	Pos.	Name	Country	Age	Type	Moving to	Transfer window	Transfer fee	Apps	Goals	Source
30	FW	Akinbiyi	(Nigeria)	35	Out of Contract		Summer	n/a	11	0	
14	FW	Canham	(England)	25	Out of Contract	Hereford United	Summer	n/a	30	4	
17	DF	Clapham	(England)	34	Out of Contract	Lincoln City	Summer	n/a	80	3	
22	FW	Facey	(Grenada)	29	Out of Contract	Lincoln City	Summer	n/a	71	12	
16	FW	Fairclough	(England)	20	Out of Contract	Hinckley United	Summer	n/a	11	0	
7	MF	Hamshaw	(England)	28	Out of Contract	Macclesfield Town	Summer	n/a	70	3	
12	GK	Pilkington	(England)	36	Out of Contract	Luton Town	Summer	n/a	149	0	
23	GK	Schmeichel	(Denmark)	23	Released	Leeds United	Summer	n/a	40	0	
21	MF	Jackson	(England)	27	Transfer	Charlton Athletic	Summer	Free	30	3	
19	FW	Rodgers	(England)	28	Released			n/a	46	13	
11	MF	Davies	(England)	29	Transfer	Derby County	Winter	Undisclosed	80	24	

EU = if holds or not a European Union passport; Country: when 2 flags, 1st flag = country that plays for internationally, 2nd flag = country of birth; N = number on jersey; P = Position (for position name, pause mouse pointer on abbreviation); Name = Name on jersey (for more extensive name, pause mouse pointer on name); Age = age on the day of the signing; Moving from = only indicate the club the player was playing before start playing for this club in this season, for the type of the moving see Status column; Moving to = only indicates the club the player is going to play next, for the type of the moving see Status column; Ends = when the player's current contract ends; n/a = Not applicable; Apps = Total number of competitive appearances (including substitute appearances) at the club prior to departure; Goals = Total number of competitive goals scored at the club prior to departure.

=== Loans out ===
No.	Pos.	Name	Country	Age	Loan club	Started	Ended	Start source	End source
23	GK	Gróf	(Hungary)	21	Tamworth	5 Aug	10 Aug		
18	DF	Hunt	(England)	41	Lincoln City	20 Jan			
23	GK	Gróf	(Hungary)	37	Mansfield Town	31 Jan			

Sources: For loan start source see "Start source". For loan end source see "End source".
EU = if holds or not a European Union passport; Country: when 2 flags, 1st flag = country that plays for internationally, 2nd flag = country of birth; No. = number on jersey; P = Position (for position name, pause mouse pointer on abbreviation); Name = Name on jersey (for more extensive name, pause mouse pointer on name); In/Out = In: The player came in on loan, Out: The player went out on loan; Loan club = the club that the player moved on loan to or the club that the player came from on loan; Started = the date when the player's loan started; Ended = the date when the player's loan ended.

=== Contract Extensions ===
No.	Pos.	Nat.	Name	Age	Status	Contract length	Expiry date	Source
9	FW	(England)	Hughes	34	Signed	1 year	July 2012	
10	MF	(England)	Bishop	28	Signed	1 year	July 2012	
12	DF	(England)	Pearce	21	Signed	2 years	July 2013	

== Fixtures & Results ==
=== Pre-season ===
11 Jul 2010 Friendly	SV Austria Salzburg	1–2	Notts County	Salzburg
19:00 BST	Wührer 50'	(report)	Lee 8'; Rodgers 46'	Stadium: ASKÖ-Sportanlage West

14 Jul 2010 Friendly	Arka Gdynia	1–0	Notts County	Hallein
18:00 BST	Glavina 42'	(report)

22 Jul 2010 Friendly	Notts County	0–0	Stoke City	Nottingham
19:45		(report)		Stadium: Meadow Lane; Attendance: 2,125

24 Jul 2010 Friendly	Notts County	2–1	Cardiff City	Nottingham
15:00	Hughes 28', 43'	(report)	McCormack 63'	Stadium: Meadow Lane; Attendance: 2,490

27 Jul 2010 Friendly	Notts County	0–1	Sheffield United	Nottingham
19:45		(report)	Evans 87'	Stadium: Meadow Lane; Attendance: 2,462

=== League One ===
7 Aug 2010 League One	Notts County	0–3	Huddersfield Town	Nottingham
15:00	Ravenhill (yellow card) 40'; Hunt (substituted off) Westcarr (substituted on) 57'; Burgess (substituted off) Jervis (substituted on) 67'; Ravenhill (substituted off) Spicer (substituted on) 74'; Lee (yellow card) 79'	report	32' Pilkington; 35' 'Rhodes; (yellow card) 41' Roberts; 72' Pilkington; (substituted off) 79' Arfield (substituted on) Johnson; (substituted off) 82' Rhodes (substituted on) Novak; (yellow card) 84' P Clarke	Stadium: Meadow Lane; Attendance: 10,342; Referee: Kettle

14 Aug 2010 League One	Oldham Athletic	3–0	Notts County	Oldham
15:00	Furman 31'; Tounkara (yellow card) 36'; Tounkara 66'; Kelly (substituted off) Bembo-Leta (substituted on) 78'; Alessandra (substituted off) l (substituted on) 85'; Lee 87'; Jones (substituted off) Millar (substituted on) 89'	(report)	(yellow card) 54' Pearce; (substituted off) 57' Burges (substituted on) Smith; (substituted off) 71' Ravenhill (substituted on) Spicer; (substituted off) 71' Davies (substituted on) Jervis	Stadium: Boundary Park; Attendance: 5,037; Referee: Webster

21 Aug 2010 League One	Notts County	1–0	Dagenham & Redbridge	Nottingham
15:00	Harley (yellow card) 38'; Ravenhill (yellow card) 42'; Westcarr 53'	(report)	(yellow card) 28' Doe; (yellow card) 62' Ogogo; (substituted off) 67' Lewis (substituted on) Scannell; (yellow card) 70' Gain; (substituted off) 76' Scott (substituted on) Nurse; (yellow card) 84' Benson; (substituted off) 90' McCrory (substituted on) Currie	Stadium: Meadow Lane; Attendance: 5,210; Referee: Haines

28 Aug 2010 League One	Bournemouth	3–3	Notts County	Bournemouth
15:00	McQuoid 3', 25'; Robinson 28'; Feeney (substituted off) Hollands (substituted on) 71'; McQuiod (substituted off) Taylor (substituted on) 77'; Symes (substituted off) Bradbury (substituted on) 84'	(report)	30' Burgess; (substituted on) 46' Ravenhill (substituted on) Jervis; (substituted off) 62' Burgess (substituted on) Smith; (yellow card) 64' Thompson; (yellow card) 67' Bishop; 90+1' Westcarr; (yellow card) 90+4' Lee; 90+5' Smith	Stadium: Dean Court; Attendance: 6,447; Referee: Danny McDermid

4 Sep 2010 League One	Notts County	4–0	Yeovil Town	Nottingham
15:00	Hughes (yellow card) 21'; Westcarr 24'; Davies 29', 45+3'; Smith (substituted off) Jervis (substituted on) 60'; Westcarr (substituted off) Spicer (substituted on) 71'; Hughes 73'; Lee (substituted off) Chilvers (substituted on) 79'; Ravenhill (yellow card) 80'	(report)	(yellow card) 25' Tudur-Jones; (substituted off) 62' Ayling (substituted on) Stewart; (substituted off) 77' Freeman (substituted on) Calver; (yellow card) 90+3' Smith	Stadium: Meadow Lane; Attendance: 6,288; Referee: Webb

11 Sep 2010 League One	Charlton Athletic	1–0	Notts County	London
15:00	Martin (yellow card) 8'; McCormack (substituted off) Racon (substituted on) 46'; Fry (yellow card) 74'; Benson (substituted off) Anyinsah (substituted on) 76'; Abbott (substituted off) Sodje (substituted on) 83'; Anyinsah 85'; Elliott (yellow card) 90+4'	(report)	(yellow card) 9' Hughes; (yellow card) 50' Harley; (substituted off) 72' Smith (substituted on) Jervis; (substituted off) 88' Ravenhill (substituted on) Burgess	Stadium: The Valley; Attendance: 14,436; Referee: Tierney

18 Sep 2010 League One	Notts County	3–2	Leyton Orient	Nottingham
15:00	Hughes 14'; Westcarr 21'; Smith (substituted off) Judge (substituted on) 56'; Hughes 74'; Pearce (yellow card) 79'; Ravenhill (yellow card) 81'; Bishop (yellow card) 86'; Hughes (substituted off) Burgess (substituted on) 90+2'	(report)	22' Jarvis; 54' Spring; (substituted off) 65' Jarvis (substituted on) Walker; (yellow card) 70' Cox; (yellow card) 79' Dawson; (yellow card) 82' Chorley	Stadium: Meadow Lane; Attendance: 6,256; Referee: Rushton

25 Sep 2010 League One	Bristol Rovers	2–1	Notts County	Bristol
15:00	Hoskins 5'; Campbell (yellow card) 13'; Akinde (substituted off) Brown (substituted on) 46'; Hoskins 56'; Hoskins (substituted off) Richards (substituted on) 70'; Coles (substituted off) Tunnicliffe (substituted on) 79'; Andersen (yellow card) 90+4'	(report)	(yellow card) 22' Lee; (yellow card) (red card) 39' Lee; (substituted off) 41' Jervis (substituted on) Edwards; (substituted off) 62' Westcarr (substituted on) Smith; (substituted off) 70' Judge (substituted on) Hawley; 87' Davies; (yellow card) 90+6' Davies	Stadium: Memorial Stadium; Attendance: 5,962; Referee: Whitestone

28 Sep 2010 League One	Peterborough United	2–3	Notts County	Peterborough
19:45	Gills (yellow card) 28'; Zakuani 36'; Gill (substituted off) Lee (substituted on) 46'; Whelpdale (substituted off) Little (substituted on) 46'; Mackail-Smith 59'; McCann (red card) 66'; McLean (yellow card) 69'; Tomlin (substituted off) Mendez-Laing (substituted on) 88'	(report)	31', 34' Davies; (yellow card) 42' Smith; 43' Westcarr; (substituted off) 63' Smith (substituted on) Hawley; (yellow card) 69' Ravehill; (substituted off) 78' Westcarr (substituted on) Spicer; (yellow card) 90+1' Judge; (yellow card) 90+3' Bishop; (substituted off) 90+5' Judge (substituted on) Jervis; (yellow card) (red card) 90+7' Ravenhill	Stadium: London Road; Attendance: 6,136; Referee: Woolmer

2 Oct 2010 League One	Notts County	0–2	Sheffield Wednesday	Nottingham
15:00	Hughes (yellow card) 59'; Edwards (yellow card) 64'; Smith (substituted off) Hawley (substituted on) 65'; Bishop (yellow card) 75'; Spicer (substituted off) Rodgers (substituted on) 80'; Judge (red card) 87'	(report)	52' Tudgay (substituted off) 61' Heffernan (substituted on) Potter; (substituted off) 61' Morrison (substituted on) Mellor; (yellow card) 62' Spurr; (yellow card) 75'Coke; (yellow card) 82' Potter; 90+6' Potter	Stadium: Meadow Lane; Attendance: 11,355; Referee: Taylor

9 Oct 2010 League One	Carlisle United	1–0	Notts County	Carlisle
15:00	Norwood (substituted off) Robson (substituted on) 54'; Madine 68'	(report)	(yellow card) 28' Smith; (substituted off) 73' Smith (substituted on) Rodgers; (substituted off) 81' Hawley (substituted on) Jervis	Stadium: Brunton Park; Attendance: 5,599; Referee: Naylor

16 Oct 2010 League One	Notts County	2–0	Plymouth Argyle	Nottingham
15:00	Ravenhill (yellow card) 33'; Westcarr 35'; Spicer 51'; Bishop (substituted off) Smith (substituted on) 59'; Thompson (yellow card) 81'; Spicer (substituted off) Hawley (substituted on) 81'; Westcarr (yellow card) 83'	report	(yellow card) 38' Bhasera; (substituted off) 53' Molyneux (substituted on) Fallon; (substituted off) 53' Clark (substituted on) Bolasie; (substituted off) 71' Parrett (substituted on) Nelson; (yellow card) 80' Árnason	Stadium: Meadow Lane; Attendance: 6,333; Referee: Lewis

23 Oct 2010 League One	Colchester United	2–1	Notts County	Colchester
15:00	Perkins (yellow card) 18'; Wordsworth (substituted off) Odejayi (substituted on) 37'; Bond (substituted off) Henderson (substituted on) 71'; Odejayi 76', 83'; Vincent (yellow card) 89'; Vincent (substituted off) Beevers (substituted on) 90+2'	report	8' Westcarr; (substituted off) 12' Westcarr (substituted on) Smith; (yellow card) 72' Hughes; (substituted off) 78' Smith (substituted on) Jervis; (yellow card) 82' Pearce	Stadium: Colchester Community Stadium; Attendance: 3,811; Referee: Sheldrake

30 Oct 2010 League One	Notts County	1–3	Southampton	Nottingham
15:00	Edwards 9'; Thompson (red card) 68'; Harley (yellow card) 72'; Judge (substituted off) Lee (substituted on) 74'; Hawley (substituted off) Rodgers (substituted on) 76'; Ravenhill (substituted off) Jervis (substituted on) 84'	report	(yellow card) 23' Lambert; 68' Lambert; (substituted off) 69' Puncheon (substituted on) Oxlade-Chamberlain; (substituted off) 69' Schneiderlin (substituted on) Chaplow; 73' Barnard; (substituted off) 82' Barnard (substituted on) Bignall; (yellow card) 86' Seaborne; 90+4' Lallana	Stadium: Meadow Lane; Attendance: 9,547; Referee: Waugh

2 Nov 2010 League One	Hartlepool United	P–P	Notts County	Hartlepool
19:45				Stadium: Victoria Park

13 Nov 2010 League One	Exeter City	3–1	Notts County	Exeter
15:00	Cureton 18'; Logan 32'; Harley 66'; Dunne (substituted off) Cozic (substituted on) 86'; Logan (substituted off) Stewart (substituted on) 89'	report	45' Hughes; (yellow card) 49' Spicer; (substituted off) 64' Hawley (substituted on) Westcarr; (substituted off) 68' Ravenhill (substituted on) Bishop; (yellow card) 70' Harley; (substituted off) 74' Spicer (substituted on) Ince	Stadium: St. James Park; Attendance: 5,302; Referee: Mark Heywood

20 Nov 2010 League One	Notts County	0–1	Tranmere Rovers	Nottingham
15:00	Judge (substituted off) Miller (substituted on) 64'; Westcarr (substituted off) Rodgers (substituted on) 75'; Darby (substituted off) Hawley (substituted on) 84'; Ravenhill (yellow card) 87'	report	(yellow card) 11' Bakayogo; (substituted off) 25' Bakayogo (substituted on) Cresswell; (yellow card) 34' Welsh; 50' Showunmi; (substituted off) 52' Showunmi (substituted on) Akins; (red card) 75' Labadie; (yellow card) 83' Goodison	Stadium: Meadow Lane; Attendance: 5,782; Referee: Geoff Eltringham

23 Nov 2010 League One	Notts County	1–0	Swindon Town	Nottingham
19:45	Ravenhill (substituted off) Spicer (substituted on) 60'; Miller (substituted off) Hughes (substituted on) 71'; Judge (yellow card) 87'; Hughes 88'; Chilvers (yellow card) 90+3'	report	(yellow card) 37' Douglas; (substituted off) 52' Douglas (substituted on) McGovern; (yellow card) 58' Dossevi; (yellow card) 66' Jean-François; (substituted off) 73' Jean-François (substituted on) Caddis; (substituted off) 80' Dossevi (substituted on) Ball	Stadium: Meadow Lane; Attendance: 4,644; Referee: Pawson

4 Dec 2010 League One	Brentford	P–P	Notts County	London
15:00				Stadium: Griffin Park

11 Dec 2010 League One	Notts County	2–0	Milton Keynes Dons	Nottingham
15:00	Ravenhill (yellow card) 18'; Chilvers (yellow card) 27'; Chilvers (substituted off) Pearce (substituted on) 36'; Miller (substituted off) Hughes (substituted on) 70'; Judge (substituted off) Ince (substituted on) 80'; Ince 86'; Hughes 90+2'	report	(yellow card) 32' Wilbraham; (substituted off) 46' Doumbé (substituted on) Ibehre; (yellow card) 58' Lewington; (substituted off) 70' Guy (substituted on) Chadwick; (red card) 75' Wilbraham; (yellow card) 84' Gleeson; (substituted off) 87' Carrington (substituted on) Powell	Stadium: Meadow Lane; Attendance: 5,172; Referee: Phillips

17 Dec 2010 League One	Brighton & Hove Albion	P–P	Notts County	Brighton
19:45				Stadium: Withdean Stadium

26 Dec 2010 League One	Notts County	P–P	Rochdale	Nottingham
15:00				Stadium: Meadow Lane

28 Dec 2010 League One	Plymouth Argyle	1–1	Notts County	Plymouth
15:00	Zubar 4'; Patterson (yellow card) 9'; Paterson (substituted off) Bhasera (substituted on) 46'; Mason (substituted off) Bolasie (substituted on) 62'; Nelson (substituted off) N'Gala (substituted on) 79'		7' Hughes; (yellow card) 21' Hughes; (yellow card) 57' Darby; (substituted off) 64' Westcarr (substituted on) Ince; (substituted off) 83' Miller (substituted on) Hawley; (yellow card) 90+4' Bishop	Stadium: Home Park; Attendance: 9,822; Referee: Tanner

1 Jan 2011 League One	Walsall	0–3	Notts County	Walsall
15:00	Butler (yellow card) 48'; Grigg (substituted off) Reid (substituted on) 56'; Nicholls (substituted off) Macken (substituted on) 58'; Gray (substituted off) Paterson	report	9' Westcarr; 16' Miller; 56' Pearce; (substituted off) 75' Westcarr (substituted on) Ravenhill; (substituted off) 82' Miller (substituted on) Burgess; (substituted off) 87' Judge (substituted on) Hawley	Stadium: The Banks' Stadium; Attendance: 4,131; Referee: Lewis

3 Jan 2011 League One	Notts County	3–0	Hartlepool United	Nottingham
15:00	Burch (substituted off) Nelson (substituted on) 13'; Ince 44'; Judge (substituted off) Ravenhill (substituted on) 61'; Miller 70'; Westcarr 79'; Westcarr (substituted off) Hughes (substituted on) 82'	report	(yellow card) 49' Austin; (substituted off) 65' Gamble (substituted on) Brown; (substituted off) 72' Humphreys (substituted on) Boyd; (substituted off) 72' Björnsson (substituted on) McSweeney; (yellow card) 79' Haslam; (yellow card) 88' Monkhouse	Stadium: Meadow Lane; Attendance: 6,285; Referee: Drysdale

8 Jan 2011 League One	Notts County	P–P	Colchester United	Nottingham
15:00				Stadium: Meadow Lane

15 Jan 2011 League One	Southampton	0–0	Notts County	Southampton
15:00	Richardson (yellow card) 23'; Chaplow (substituted off) Gobern (substituted on) 46'; Puncheon (substituted off) Barnard (substituted on) 79'	report	(yellow card) 43' Edwards; (yellow card) 45+1' Harley; (yellow card) 65' Thompson; (substituted off) 74' Gow (substituted on) Burgess; (substituted off) 83' Judge (substituted off) Hunt; (substituted off) 87' Ravenhill (substituted on) Spicer	Stadium: St Mary's Stadium; Attendance: 20,201; Referee: Scott

22 Jan 2011 League One	Notts County	0–1	Carlisle United	Nottingham
15:00		report	Zoko 55'	Stadium: Meadow Lane; Attendance: 6,327; Referee: Bates

25 Jan 2011 League One	Hartlepool United	1–1	Notts County	Victoria Park
19:45	Liddle 38'	report	Hughes 69'	Attendance: 2,545

29 Jan 2011 League One	Rochdale	P–P	Notts County	Rochdale
15:00				Stadium: Spotland Stadium

2 Feb 2011 League One	Notts County	1–1	Walsall	Nottingham
19:45	Hughes 64'	report	Nicholls 88'	Stadium: Meadow Lane; Attendance: 4,714; Referee: Ilberton

5 Feb 2011 League One	Tranmere Rovers	P–P	Notts County	Prenton
15:00				Stadium: Prenton Park

12 Feb 2011 League One	Notts County	0–2	Exeter City	Nottingham
15:00		report	Tully 54'; Taylor 73'	Stadium: Meadow Lane; Attendance: 6,176; Referee: Pawson

15 Feb 2011 League One	Notts County	2–0	Colchester United	Nottingham
19:45	Westcarr 21'; Clarke 37' (o.g.)	report		Stadium: Meadow Lane; Attendance: 4,041; Referee: Webster

19 Feb 2011 League One	Yeovil Town	P–P	Notts County	Yeovil
15:00				Stadium: Huish Park

25 Feb 2011 League One	Notts County	1–0	Charlton Athletic	Nottingham
19:45	Bishop 49'	report		Stadium: Meadow Lane; Attendance: 8,141; Referee: Moss

1 Mar 2011 League One	Brentford	1–1	Notts County	London
19:45	Osborne 74'	report	44' Westcarr	Stadium: Griffin Park; Attendance: 3,795; Referee: Williamson

5 Mar 2011 League One	Leyton Orient	2–0	Notts County	London
15:00	Cox 8'; Whing 79'	report		Stadium: Brisbane Road; Attendance: 4,238; Referee: Hegley

8 Mar 2011 League One	Notts County	0–1	Peterborough United	Nottingham
19:45		report	57' Lee	Stadium: Meadow Lane; Attendance: 5,714; Referee: Swarbick

12 Mar 2011 League One	Sheffield Wednesday	0–1	Notts County	Sheffield
15:00		report	27' (pen.) Gow	Stadium: Hillsborough Stadium; Attendance: 17,853; Referee: Brown

15 Mar 2011 League One	Rochdale	1–0	Notts County	Rochdale
19:45	Dawson 46'	report		Stadium: Spotland Stadium; Attendance: 2,019; Referee: Salisbury

19 Mar 2011 League One	Notts County	0–1	Bristol Rovers	Nottingham
15:00		report	62' Hoskins	Stadium: Meadow Lane; Attendance: 5,691; Referee: Danny McDermid

22 Mar 2011 League One	Brighton & Hove Albion	1–0	Notts County	Brighton
19:45	Calderón 63'	report		Stadium: Withdean Stadium; Attendance: 7,264; Referee: Crossley

27 Mar 2011 League One	Huddersfield Town	3–0	Notts County	Huddersfield
15:00	Rhodes 36', 61'; Roberts 58'	report		Stadium: Galpharm Stadium; Attendance: 13,661; Referee: Mathieson

2 Apr 2011 League One	Notts County	0–2	Oldham Athletic	Nottingham
15:00	Edwards (red card) 86'	report	87' (pen.) Lowe; 90+3' Reid	Stadium: Meadow Lane; Attendance: 5,538; Referee: Bobby Madley

5 Apr 2011 League One	Notts County	1–2	Rochdale	Nottingham
19:45	Hughes 54'	report	7' Dawson; 15'	Stadium: Meadow Lane; Attendance: 4,698; Referee: Russell

9 Apr 2011 League One	Dagenham & Redbridge	3–1	Notts County	London
15:00	Akinde 16'; Green 41', 45+6' (pen.)	report	(red card) 40' Lee; 69' Demba-Nyrén	Stadium: Victoria Road; Attendance: 2,608; Referee: Haywood

16 Apr 2011 League One	Notts County	0–2	Bournemouth	Nottingham
15:00		report	67' Robinson; 77' Ings	Stadium: Meadow Lane; Attendance: 6,010; Referee: Haines

16 Apr 2011 League One	Tranmere Rovers	0–1	Notts County	Tranmere
19:45		report	42' (pen.) Westcarr; (red card) 90+8'	Stadium: Prenton Park; Attendance: 12,249; Referee: Quinn

23 Apr 2011 League One	Swindon Town	1–2	Notts County	Swindon
15:00	Ritchie 18'	report	78' Judge; 85' Hughes	Stadium: County Ground; Attendance: 8,064; Referee: Woolmer

25 Apr 2011 League One	Notts County	1–1	Brentford	Nottingham
15:00	Lee Hughes 82' (pen.)		90+5' Schlupp	Stadium: Meadow Lane; Attendance: 6,879; Referee: Foster

30 Apr 2011 League One	Milton Keynes Dons	2–1	Notts County	Milton Keynes
15:00	Baldock 50'; Balanta 60'	report	62' Hughes	Stadium: Stadium:mk; Attendance: 10,013; Referee: Rushton

7 May 2011 League One	Notts County	1–1	Brighton & Hove Albion	Nottingham
15:00				Stadium: Meadow Lane

=== FA Cup ===
6 Nov 2010 Round 1	Notts County	2–0	Gateshead	Nottingham
15:00	Davies 22' (pen.); Ravenhill (yellow card) 55'; Rodgers 83'	(report)	(yellow card) 87' Shaw	Stadium: Meadow Lane; Attendance: 3,235; Referee: Barratt

14 Dec 2010 Round 2	Notts County	3–1	Bournemouth	Nottingham
19:45	Ravenhill (substituted off) Woods (substituted on) 3'; Pearce 18'; Hughes 35'; Cummings 45' (o.g.); Hughes (substituted off) Miller (substituted on) 69'; Hunt (substituted off) Ince; Harley (yellow card) 90'	(report)	(yellow card) 17' Hollands; (substituted off) 46' Cummings (substituted on) Bradbury; (substituted off) 46' Purches (substituted on) Smith; (yellow card) 67' Bradbury; (yellow card) 70' Bartley (substituted off) 81' Pugh (substituted on) Fletcher; 84' Fletcher	Stadium: Meadow Lane; Attendance: 2,881; Referee: Swarbrick

8 Jan 2011 Round 3	Sunderland	1–2	Notts County	Sunderland
15:00	Colback (substituted off) Henderson (substituted on) 60'; Riveros (substituted off) Elmohamady (substituted on) 60'; Angeleri (substituted off) Bardsley; Bent 81' (pen.)	report	5' Westcarr; 75' Hughes; (substituted off) 79' Judge (substituted on) Hunt; (substituted off) 84' Hughes (substituted on) Woods; (yellow card) 90' Nelson; (substituted off) 90+2' Westcarr (substituted on) Hawley; (yellow card) 90+2' Bishop	Stadium: Stadium of Light; Attendance: 17,582; Referee: Attwell

29 Jan 2011 Round 4	Notts County	1–1	Manchester City	Nottingham
14:00	Bishop 59'	report	Džeko 80'	Stadium: Meadow Lane; Attendance: 16,587; Referee: Foy

20 Feb 2011 Round 4 replay	Manchester City	5–0	Notts County	Manchester
14:00	Vieira 37', 58'; Tevez 84'; Džeko 89'; Richards 90'	report		Stadium: City of Manchester Stadium; Attendance: 27,276; Referee: Jones

=== Football League Cup ===
10 Aug 2010 Round 1	Plymouth Argyle	0–1	Notts County	Plymouth
19:45	Molyneux (substituted off) Paterson (substituted on) 46'; Noone (yellow card) 65'; Peterlin (substituted off) Nelson (substituted on) 65'; Fallon (substituted off) MacLean (substituted on) 75'; Nelson (yellow card) 79'; MacLean (yellow card) 82'	(report)	52' Spicer; (substituted off) 54' Burgess (substituted on) Jervis; (yellow card) 67' Spicer; (yellow card) 68' Davies; (substituted off) 71' Spicer (substituted on) Smith; (substituted off) 84' Davies (substituted on) Hunt	Stadium: Home Park; Attendance: 5,454; Referee: Tanner

24 Aug 2010 Round 2	Watford	1–2	Notts County	Watford
19:45	Buckley (substituted off) Graham (substituted on) 73'; Deeney 78'; Thompson (substituted off) Oshodi (substituted on) 79'; Jenkins (yellow card) 85'; Graham (substituted off) Bryan (substituted on) 90'	(report)	(yellow card) 43' Ravenhill; 46' Davies; (substituted off) 59' Hubbins (substituted on) Westcarr; 67' Smith; (yellow card) 80' Bishop; (substituted off) 82' Jervis (substituted on) Harley; (yellow card) 84' Davies; (substituted off) 88' Smith (substituted on) Lee	Stadium: Vicarage Road; Attendance: 6,434; Referee: Crossley

21 Sep 2010 Round 3	Wolverhampton Wanderers	4–2	Notts County	Wolverhampton
19:45	Mouyokolo (substituted off) Mujangi Bia (substituted on) 62'; Bent (substituted off) Fletcher (substituted on) 72'; Milijaš 83'; Ebanks-Blake (substituted off) Kevin Doyle (substituted on) 91'; Fletcher 92'; Doyle 105+2'; Berra (yellow card) 106'; Doyle 119'	(report)	(substituted off) 12' Thompson (substituted on) Edwards; 57' Hughes; (yellow card) 58' Hughes; (substituted off) 79' Hughes (substituted on) Jervis; (red card) 82' Chilvers; (yellow card) 90' Jervis; (substituted off) 91' Spicer; Smith 114' Smith	Stadium: Molineux Stadium; Attendance: 11,516; Referee: Linington

=== Football League Trophy ===
1 Sep 2010 Round 1	Sheffield Wednesday	2–1	Notts County	Sheffield
19:45	O'Connor 2', 14'; Sedgwick (substituted off) Miller (substituted on) 38'; Potter (yellow card) 40'; Morrison (substituted off) Mellor (substituted on) 68'	(report)	23' Davies; (yellow card) 49' Hubbins; (substituted off) 54' Hubbins (substituted on) Westcarr; (substituted off) 66' Jervis (substituted on) Hawley; (substituted off) 80' Smith (substituted on) Pearce; (yellow card) 88' Pearce; (yellow card) 90+3' Harley	Stadium: Hillsborough Stadium; Attendance: 10,551; Referee: Quinn

== Backroom staff ==
Position	Name
First-Team Manager	Paul Ince
Assistant Manager	Alex Rae
Coach	Vacant
Youth Team Manager	Michael Johnson
Goalkeeping Coach	Carl Muggleton
Physio	Paul Godfrey
Fitness Coach	Marcus Svensson
Head of Youth	Mick Leonard
Chief Scout	Carl Heggs

== See also ==
- Notts County F.C. seasons
