= Kieron St Aimie =

English footballer (born 1989)

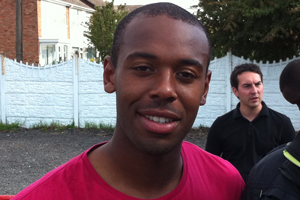
- St Aimie in 2011

Personal information
- Full name: Kieron Lloyd Junior Minto-St Aimie
- Date of birth: 4 May 1989 (age 37)
- Place of birth: Wembley, England
- Height: 6 ft 1 in (1.85 m)
- Position: Striker

Youth career
- –2007: Queens Park Rangers

Senior career*
Years	Team	Apps	(Gls)
2007–2008	Queens Park Rangers	0	(0)
2007	→ Oxford United (loan)	2	(0)
2008–2009	Barnet	13	(0)
2008	→ Grays Athletic (loan)	6	(2)
2008	→ Stevenage Borough (loan)	1	(0)
2009	→ Lewes (loan)	5	(0)
2009	Thurrock	2	(1)
2009	Hitchin Town	8	(1)
2009–2011	Maidenhead United	60	(15)
2011	Lewes	1	(0)
2011	AFC Hornchurch	5	(4)
2011	Kettering Town	6	(2)
2011–2012	Tamworth	30	(7)
2012–2013	AFC Telford United	25	(6)
2013	Whitehawk	2	(1)
2013	AFC Hornchurch	6	(4)
2013–2014	Chelmsford City	26	(6)
2014–2016	Welling United	27	(5)
2016	AFC Hornchurch	5	(0)
- * Club domestic league appearances and goals as of 11:06, 12 June 2023 (UTC)

Kieron Lloyd Junior Minto-St Aimie (born 4 May 1989), known as Kieron St Aimie, is an English former professional footballer who played as a striker.

== Career ==
=== Queens Park Rangers ===
Born in Wembley, London, St Aimie began his career at Queens Park Rangers, playing in the youth system as a trainee before signing a professional contract on 19 May 2007. He scored on his first team debut with a solo effort against Celtic.

He then had a spell on loan at Oxford United in October 2007.

=== Barnet ===
He signed for Barnet on 24 January 2008 after having his contract terminated by Queens Park Rangers.

St Aimie didn't really get going with the club and on 19 September 2008, St Aimie was loaned out for a month to Conference National outfit, Grays Athletic, scoring two goals on his debut against Wrexham, his first goals in a competitive game. On loan deadline day in the same year he joined Stevenage Borough. St Aimie then joined Lewes on loan in January 2009, making two appearances in the FA Trophy and scoring one goal, it would be his third Conference National club he played for during the 2008–09 season. He left Barnet by mutual consent in February 2009,

=== Thurrock ===
Following his release from Barnet, St Aimie started what was a mad time in his career, he initially joined Thurrock in March 2009, but only stayed around to make two appearances and score one goal.

=== Hitchin Town ===
A month later he joined Hitchin Town, playing eight times and scoring one goal.

=== Maidenhead United ===
He then joined Maidenhead United in August 2009, St Aimie really settled with the club he made 32 appearances, and continued his impressive goal record with 17 goals, but in March 2011 he was released by the club.

=== Lewes ===
St Aimie found a new club, returning to sign for Lewes; a club he had a loan spell with in 2009 whilst with Barnet. St Aimie failed to settle with his new club and left after just one week, making just one appearance.

=== AFC Hornchurch ===
AFC Hornchurch confirmed on 14 March 2011 that they had signed St Aimie, his first appearance two days prior as a substitute in the 1–0 defeat at Harrow Borough. He endured another short lived stay, making four appearances and scoring three goals. On 1 March 2013 he resigned for Hornchurch.

=== Kettering Town ===
On 1 April 2011, St Aimie and his former Queens Park Rangers teammate, Stefan Bailey joined Conference National side Kettering Town, with both players signing on non-contract terms until the end of the season.

St Aimie had a 50% strike rate with Kettering Town, going on to make six appearances, and scored three goals, before been released at the end of the 2010–11 season.

=== Tamworth ===
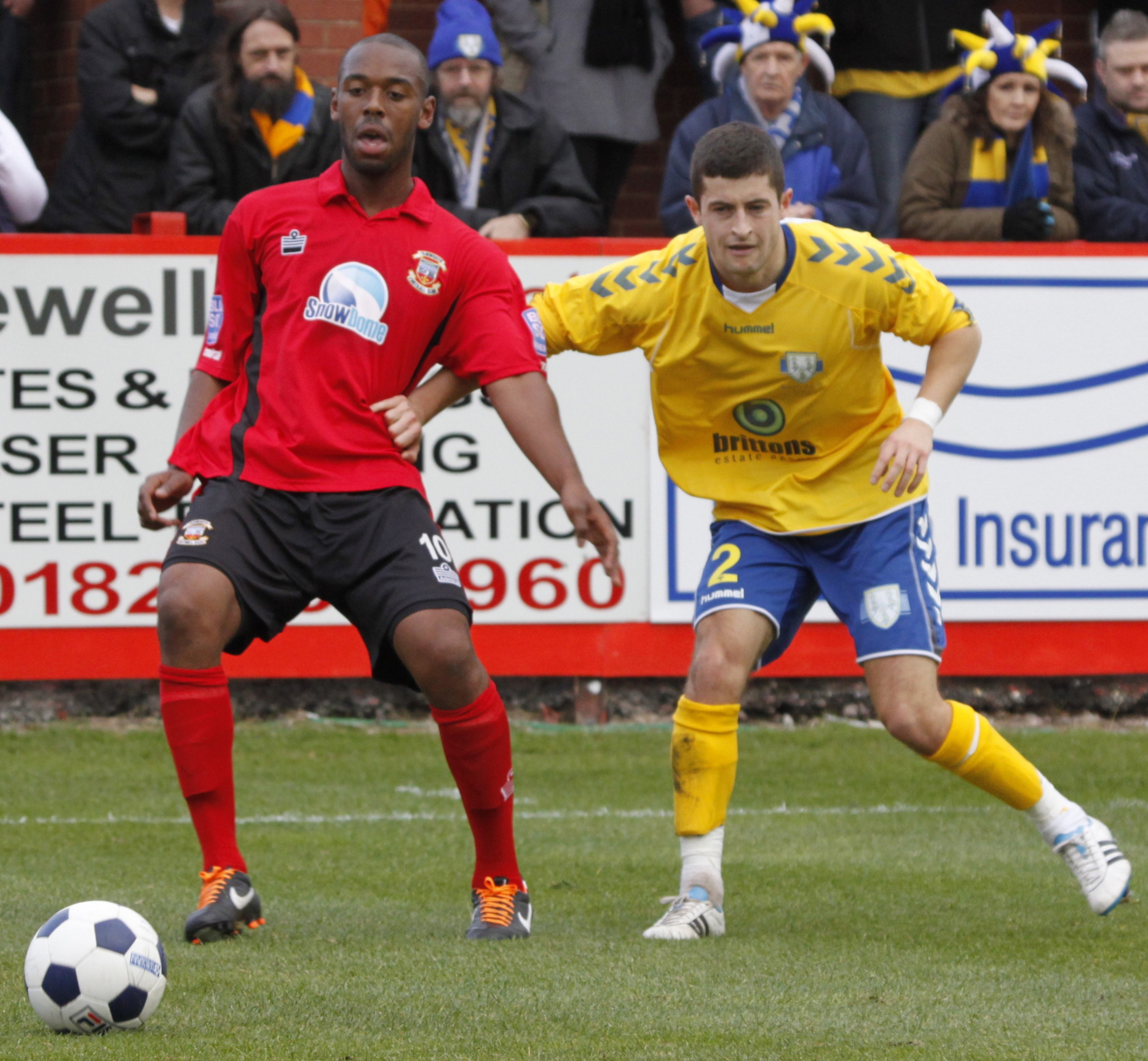
St Aimie in action for Tamworth.

Conference National side Tamworth confirmed on 16 June 2011, that the club has signed St Aimie following the end of his contract with Kettering Town, also joined at the club on the same day by Francino Francis who joined from Barwell.

St Aimie scored his first two goals for Tamworth five games into the season against AFC Telford United, his first came on 41 minutes, St Aimie finding space, picked the ball up on the edge of the area and hit a fine left-foot shot past Young into the bottom corner, he put Tamworth 2–0 up on 67 minutes, St Aimie, who struck a low shot into the corner of the net after a cross from defender Richard Tait, but Telford pulled goals back within 15 minutes, the game ending a draw. Two games later, in the 2–1 victory against York City, St Aimie scored a 53rd minute penalty to open the scoring, after he was fouled by defender Chris Smith.

=== AFC Telford United ===
On 31 July 2012, he signed for AFC Telford United on a one-year deal, with the option to extend it further.

St Aimie scored his first goal three games into the season on 18 August 2012 against Braintree Town, scoring the second goal of the game on 18 minutes, slotting home Steven Leslie's flick-on from Luke Hubbins' right-wing cross, Telford went on to a 3–0 victory. On 25 August 2012 he scored a decisive goal four minutes before half time at Luton Town, Steven Leslie's perfectly placed free-kick for St Aimie to head home past Mark Tyler. Two days later he scored a 56th-minute equaliser against Stockport County, good work from Luke Hubbins playing a couple of one-two's with Steven Leslie to slide the ball across for St Aimie to sidefoot home from close range, the game finishing a 2–2 stalemate. On 1 September 2012, he scored the 3rd and final goal of the game, a powerful header in the 57th minute from Steven Leslie's right-wing corner, to make it 0–3 away at Southport.

He left Telford on 28 January 2013 because we wanted to play closer to his home and family in London.

=== Whitehawk ===
After leaving Telford, he then joined Whitehawk. He made his début for them in the 5–2 away victory against Metropolitan Police, in which he scored.

=== Welling United ===
He signed for having signed Welling United in the summer of 2014.

=== AFC Hornchurch ===
In February 2016 he made his third debut for AFC Hornchurch.

== Career statistics ==
As of match played 4 September 2012.

Club	Season	League		FA Cup		League Cup		FL Trophy		FA Trophy		Play-offs		Total	
Club	Season	Apps	Goals	Apps	Goals	Apps	Goals	Apps	Goals	Apps	Goals	Apps	Goals	Apps	Goals
Queens Park Rangers	2007–08	0	0	0	0	1	0	0	0	0	0	0	0	1	0
Oxford United (loan)	2007–08	2	0	1	0	0	0	0	0	0	0	0	0	3	0
Barnet	2007–08	10	0	0	0	0	0	0	0	0	0	0	0	10	0
Barnet	2008–09	3	0	1	0	1	0	0	0	0	0	0	0	5	0
Barnet	Total	13	0	1	0	1	0	0	0	0	0	0	0	15	0
Grays Athletic (loan)	2008–09	6	2	0	0	0	0	0	0	0	0	0	0	6	2
Stevenage Borough (loan)	2008–09	1	0	0	0	0	0	0	0	0	0	0	0	1	0
Lewes (loan)	2008–09	5	0	0	0	0	0	0	0	2	1	0	0	7	1
Thurrock	2008–09	2	1	0	0	0	0	0	0	0	0	0	0	2	1
Hitchin Town	2008–09	8	1	0	0	0	0	0	0	0	0	0	0	8	1
Maidenhead United	2009–10	35	7	1	0	0	0	0	0	3	1	0	0	39	8
Maidenhead United	2010–11	25	8	3	0	0	0	0	0	1	0	0	0	29	8
Maidenhead United	Total	60	15	3	0	0	0	0	0	4	1	0	0	67	16
Lewes	2010–11	1	0	0	0	0	0	0	0	0	0	0	0	1	0
Hornchurch	2010–11	5	3	0	0	0	0	0	0	0	0	0	0	5	3
Kettering	2010–11	6	1	0	0	0	0	0	0	0	0	0	0	6	1
Tamworth	2011–12	30	7	4	2	0	0	0	0	0	0	0	0	34	9
AFC Telford United	2012–13	24	5	0	0	0	0	0	0	0	0	0	0	24	5
Career Total		163	34	10	2	2	0	0	0	6	2	0	0	181	38

== Personal life ==
The reason for his extensive, long name – Kieron Lloyd Junior Minto St Aimie, was mentioned by St Aimie, he said: "Lloyd was my dad's name so he called me Lloyd Junior." "It is a long name I know. St Aimie is a French name. My mum is from Dominica and they speak Creole so it is broken down French."

He also has two cousins who play at a semi-professional level, Simon St Aimie who was a former Dagenham & Redbridge player and Steven St Aimie played at Waltham Forest.

=== Covid Fraud ===
On 23 December 2024, St Aimie received a director's disqualification for claiming a £25,000 Covid loan his company was not entitled to. The Chief Investigation at the Insolvency Service stated, "His eight-year disqualification should serve as a warning to others that the justice system will not allow business owners to make false declarations to obtain funds that were so crucially needed by other small and medium-sized businesses during the pandemic."
