= Wholey =

Wholey is a surname. Notable people with the surname include:

- Dennis Wholey (born 1939), American television host, producer, and writer
- Jake Wholey (born 1993), English footballer

== See also ==
- Whaley (surname)
- Wholey's, a retail company in Pittsburgh, Pennsylvania, United States
