= 2005–06 Burnley F.C. season =

English football club season

Burnley
2005–06 season
- Chairman: Barry Kilby
- Manager: Steve Cotterill
- Championship: 17th
- FA Cup: Third round
- League Cup: Third round
- Top goalscorer: League: Ade Akinbiyi (12); All: Ade Akinbiyi (14)
- Highest home attendance: 17,912 v Stoke City (26 December 2005)
- Lowest home attendance: 4,501 v Barnsley (20 September 2005)
- Average home league attendance: 12,462

The 2005–06 season was Burnley's 6th season in the second tier of English football. They were managed by Steve Cotterill in his second full season since he replaced Stan Ternent at the beginning of the 2004–05 season.

== Appearances and goals ==
No.	Pos	Nat	Player	Total		Championship		League Cup		FA Cup	
No.	Pos	Nat	Player	Apps	Goals	Apps	Goals	Apps	Goals	Apps	Goals
1	GK	(Wales) WAL	Danny Coyne	10	0	7+1	0	2+0	0	0+0	0
2	DF	(England) ENG	Wayne Thomas	19	1	12+4	1	2+0	0	0+1	0
3	DF	(United States) USA	Danny Karbassiyoon	6	0	0+5	0	0+1	0	0+0	0
4	DF	(England) ENG	John McGreal	37	0	33+2	0	1+0	0	0+1	0
5	DF	(Jamaica) JAM	Frank Sinclair	40	0	36+1	0	1+1	0	1+0	0
6	DF	(Northern Ireland) NIR	Michael Duff	45	1	39+2	0	3+0	1	1+0	0
7	MF	(Republic of Ireland) IRL	James O'Connor	50	3	46+0	3	3+0	0	1+0	0
8	MF	(Jamaica) JAM	Micah Hyde	44	0	39+2	0	2+0	0	1+0	0
9	DF	(England) ENG	Graham Branch	40	2	29+8	2	2+0	0	0+1	0
10	FW	(Nigeria) NGA	Ade Akinbiyi	33	14	29+0	12	3+0	2	1+0	0
10	FW	(England) ENG	Michael Ricketts (on loan)	13	2	12+1	2	0+0	0	0+0	0
11	MF	(England) ENG	Wade Elliott	38	3	23+13	3	1+0	0	1+0	0
12	GK	(Denmark) DEN	Brian Jensen	41	0	38+1	0	1+0	0	1+0	0
13	GK	(England) ENG	Mark Crossley	0	0	0+0	0	0+0	0	0+0	0
14	MF	(Republic of Ireland) IRL	Garreth O'Connor	33	8	26+3	7	3+0	0	1+0	1
15	FW	(England) ENG	Gifton Noel-Williams	32	2	17+12	2	1+2	0	0+0	0
16	MF	(Republic of Ireland) IRL	Chris McCann	27	2	15+8	2	2+1	0	1+0	0
17	FW	(Northern Ireland) NIR	Kyle Lafferty	12	1	3+8	1	0+1	0	0+0	0
18	FW	(Republic of Ireland) IRL	Karl Bermingham (on loan)	4	0	1+3	0	0+0	0	0+0	0
18	MF	(England) ENG	Nathan Dyer (on loan)	5	2	4+1	2	0+0	0	0+0	0
18	DF	(England) ENG	Phil Bardsley (on loan)	6	0	6+0	0	0+0	0	0+0	0
19	MF	(England) ENG	John Spicer	37	3	22+12	3	2+1	0	0+0	0
20	DF	(England) ENG	Keith Lowe (on loan)	18	1	10+6	0	2+0	1	0+0	0
20	FW	(Scotland) SCO	Andy Gray (on loan)	9	3	9+0	3	0+0	0	0+0	0
21	DF	(England) ENG	Jon Harley	44	2	41+0	2	2+0	0	1+0	0
21	FW	(Northern Ireland) NIR	Paul McVeigh (on loan)	8	0	6+2	0	0+0	0	0+0	0
22	DF	(England) ENG	Duane Courtney	8	0	1+6	0	0+1	0	0+0	0
23	GK	(England) ENG	Lee Grant (on loan)	1	0	1+0	0	0+0	0	0+0	0
23	MF	(Republic of Ireland) IRL	Alan Mahon (on loan)	8	0	7+1	0	0+0	0	0+0	0
25	MF	(England) ENG	Marc Pugh	0	0	0+0	0	0+0	0	0+0	0
26	DF	(Republic of Ireland) IRL	Martin Reilly	0	0	0+0	0	0+0	0	0+0	0
27	MF	(England) ENG	Mark Yates	0	0	0+0	0	0+0	0	0+0	0

== Transfers ==
=== In ===
#	Pos	Player	From	Fee	Date
11	MF	(England) Wade Elliott	Bournemouth	Free	16 May 2005
14	MF	(Republic of Ireland) Garreth O'Connor	Bournemouth	Free	16 May 2005
2	DF	(England) Wayne Thomas	Stoke City	Free	1 June 2005
15	FW	(England) Gifton Noel-Williams	Stoke City	Free	14 June 2005
3	DF	(United States) Danny Karbassiyoon	Arsenal	Free	30 June 2005
22	DF	(England) Duane Courtney	Telford United	£25k	1 August 2005
18	FW	(Republic of Ireland) Karl Bermingham	Manchester City	Loan	17 August 2005
20	DF	(England) Keith Lowe	Wolverhampton Wanderers	Loan	26 August 2005
19	MF	(England) John Spicer	Bournemouth	£35k	27 August 2005
21	DF	(England) Jon Harley	Sheffield United	Loan	27 August 2005
21	DF	(England) Jon Harley	Sheffield United	£75k	30 August 2005
18	MF	(England) Nathan Dyer	Southampton	Loan	28 October 2005
23	GK	(England) Lee Grant	Derby County	Loan	15 November 2005
10	FW	(England) Michael Ricketts	Leeds United	Loan	30 January 2006
18	DF	(England) Phil Bardsley	Manchester United	Loan	16 March 2006
20	FW	(Scotland) Andy Gray	Sunderland	Loan	16 March 2006
18	MF	(Republic of Ireland) Alan Mahon	Wigan Athletic	Loan	23 March 2006

=== Out ===
#	Pos	Player	To	Fee	Date
	DF	(England) Joel Pilkington	Hyde United	Released	9 May 2005
	MF	(England) Tony Grant	Bristol City	Released	9 May 2005
	DF	(England) Paul Scott		Retired	9 May 2006
	MF	(France) Jean-Louis Valois	Al-Khaleej	Released	9 May 2006
	FW	(England) Cayne Hanley		Released	31 May 2006
	DF	(Guinea) Mohammed Camara	Celtic	Free	22 June 2005
	DF	(England) Lee Roche	Wrexham	Free	6 July 2005
	MF	(England) Matthew O'Neill	Accrington Stanley	Free	25 July 2005
	MF	(Wales) John Oster	Reading	Free	2 August 2005
25	MF	(England) Marc Pugh	Kidderminster Harriers	Loan	10 November 2005
17	FW	(Northern Ireland) Kyle Lafferty	Darlington	Loan	7 January 2006
10	FW	(Nigeria) Ade Akinbiyi	Sheffield United	£1.75m	10 January 2006
25	MF	(England) Marc Pugh	Bury	Free	23 March 2006
15	FW	(England) Gifton Noel-Williams	Brighton & Hove Albion	Loan	23 March 2006

== Matches ==
=== Championship ===
6 August 2005 1	Crewe Alexandra	2–1	Burnley	Crewe
15:00	B. Jones 44'; Vaughan 89'	(Report)	Noel-Williams 67'	Stadium: Gresty Road; Attendance: 8,006; Referee: C Webster

9 August 2005 2	Burnley	1–2	Sheffield United	Burnley
19:45	Akinbiyi 72'	(Report)	Shipperley 5'; Morgan 40'	Stadium: Turf Moor; Attendance: 11,802; Referee: M Halsey

13 August 2005 3	Burnley	4–0	Coventry City	Burnley
15:00	G. O'Connor 28'; Thomas 37'; Akinbiyi 87' 90'	(Report)		Stadium: Turf Moor; Attendance: 11,683; Referee: N Miller

20 August 2005 4	Watford	3–1	Burnley	Watford
15:00	King 11'; Mahon 30'; Spring 83'	(Report)	G. O'Connor 16' (pen.)	Stadium: Vicarage Road; Attendance: 16,802; Referee: M Messias

27 August 2005 5	Burnley	2–2	Derby County	Burnley
15:00	Akinbiyi 46'; Noel-Williams 53'	(Report)	Idiakez 30'; Rasiak 90'	Stadium: Turf Moor; Attendance: 12,243; Referee: G Laws

29 August 2005 6	Reading	2–1	Burnley	Reading
15:00	Lita 7'; Doyle 70'	(Report)	Akinbiyi 42'	Stadium: Madejski Stadium; Attendance: 14,027; Referee: R Olivier

10 September 2005 7	Burnley	3–3	Cardiff City	Burnley
15:00	Elliott 1' 23'; J. O'Connor 89'	(Report)	Jerome 8'; Loovens 45'; Purse 72' (pen.)	Stadium: Turf Moor; Attendance: 10,431; Referee: P Walton

13 September 2005 8	Preston North End	0–0	Burnley	Preston
19:45		(Report)		Stadium: Deepdale; Attendance: 17,139; Referee: D Gallagher

17 September 2005 9	Plymouth Argyle	1–0	Burnley	Plymouth
15:00	Evans 46'	(Report)		Stadium: Home Park; Attendance: 11,829; Referee: K Stroud

24 September 2005 10	Burnley	1–1	Brighton & Hove Albion	Burnley
15:00	G. O'Connor 34' (pen.)	(Report)	McShane 25'	Stadium: Turf Moor; Attendance: 11,112; Referee: E Ilderton

27 September 2005 11	Burnley	3–0	Ipswich Town	Burnley
19:45	J. O'Connor 23'; G. O'Connor 72'; McCann 87'	(Report)		Stadium: Turf Moor; Attendance: 10,496; Referee: M Pike

30 September 2005 12	Wolverhampton Wanderers	0–1	Burnley	Wolverhampton
19:45		(Report)	G. O'Connor 23'	Stadium: Molineux Stadium; Attendance: 21,747; Referee: S Tanner

15 October 2005 13	Burnley	1–2	Leeds United	Burnley
12:30	G. O'Connor 60' (pen.)	(Report)	Lewis 71'; Hulse 75'	Stadium: Turf Moor; Attendance: 16,174; Referee: M Dean

18 October 2005 14	Leicester City	0–1	Burnley	Leicester
19:45		(Report)	Akinbiyi 64'	Stadium: Walkers Stadium; Attendance: 23,326; Referee: L Probert

22 October 2005 15	Crystal Palace	2–0	Burnley	London
15:00	Morrison 38'; Freedman 78'	(Report)		Stadium: Selhurst Park; Attendance: 20,127; Referee: M Thorpe

28 October 2005 16	Burnley	1–0	Hull City	Burnley
19:45	Akinbiyi 29'	(Report)		Stadium: Turf Moor; Attendance: 11,701; Referee: P Dowd

1 November 2005 17	Burnley	2–1	Millwall	Burnley
19:45	Dyer 76'; Elliott 80'	(Report)	Wright 1'	Stadium: Turf Moor; Attendance: 10,698; Referee: R Beeby

5 November 2005 18	Luton Town	2–3	Burnley	Luton
15:00	Howard 43'; Feeney 60'	(Report)	Akinbiyi 15' 31' 54' (pen.)	Stadium: Kenilworth Road; Attendance: 8,518; Referee: P Melin

19 November 2005 19	Burnley	1–0	Leicester City	Burnley
15:00	Spicer 40'	(Report)		Stadium: Turf Moor; Attendance: 12,592; Referee: M Messias

22 November 2005 20	Leeds United	2–0	Burnley	Leeds
19:45	Healy 55' (pen.); Blake 70'	(Report)		Stadium: Elland Road; Attendance: 21,318; Referee: A Bates

26 November 2005 21	Burnley	3–0	Crewe Alexandra	Burnley
15:00	Spicer 27' 68'; Dyer 72'	(Report)		Stadium: Turf Moor; Attendance: 11,151; Referee: L Probert

3 December 2005 22	Southampton	1–1	Burnley	Southampton
15:00	Higginbotham 34' (pen.)	(Report)	Akinbiyi 66'	Stadium: St Mary's Stadium; Attendance: 21,592; Referee: B Curson

10 December 2005 23	Sheffield United	3–0	Burnley	Sheffield
15:00	Shipperley 29' 81'; Webber 34'	(Report)		Stadium: Bramall Lane; Attendance: 23,118; Referee: C Webster

17 December 2005 24	Burnley	4–1	Watford	Burnley
15:00	Branch 32'; Harley 42' 77' (pen.); J. O'Connor 79'	(Report)	King 62'	Stadium: Turf Moor; Attendance: 13,815; Referee: E Ilderton

26 December 2005 25	Burnley	1–0	Stoke City	Burnley
15:00	Akinbiyi 56'	(Report)		Stadium: Turf Moor; Attendance: 17,912; Referee: N Miller

28 December 2005 26	Norwich City	2–1	Burnley	Norwich
19:45	Charlton 16'; Huckerby 39'	(Report)	Safri 73' (og.)	Stadium: Carrow Road; Attendance: 25,204; Referee: C Penton

31 December 2005 27	Burnley	1–2	Sheffield Wednesday	Burnley
13:00	G. O'Connor 84' (pen.)	(Report)	Eagles 5'; Coughlan 56'	Stadium: Turf Moor; Attendance: 14,607; Referee: A Woolmer

2 January 2006 28	Queens Park Rangers	1–1	Burnley	London
15:00	Ainsworth 45'	(Report)	McCann 10'	Stadium: Loftus Road; Attendance: 12,565; Referee: K Stroud

14 January 2006 29	Cardiff City	3–0	Burnley	Cardiff
15:00	Thompson 58' 60'; Koumas 63'	(Report)		Stadium: Ninian Park; Attendance: 10,872; Referee: D Drysdale

21 January 2006 30	Burnley	0–2	Preston North End	Burnley
15:00		(Report)	Nugent 13'; Alexander 86' (pen.)	Stadium: Turf Moor; Attendance: 17,220; Referee: P Taylor

31 January 2006 31	Brighton & Hove Albion	0–0	Burnley	Brighton
19:45		(Report)		Stadium: Withdean Stadium; Attendance: 6,267; Referee: K Wright

4 February 2006 32	Burnley	1–0	Plymouth Argyle	Burnley
15:00	Ricketts 24'	(Report)		Stadium: Turf Moor; Attendance: 11,292; Referee: T Kettle

11 February 2006 33	Ipswich Town	2–1	Burnley	Ipswich
15:00	Lee 62'; Richards 83' (pen.)	(Report)	Ricketts 45'	Stadium: Portman Road; Attendance: 24,482; Referee: D Deadman

14 February 2006 34	Burnley	0–1	Wolverhampton Wanderers	Burnley
19:45		(Report)	Ince 15'	Stadium: Turf Moor; Attendance: 11,056; Referee: C Oliver

25 February 2006 35	Coventry City	1–0	Burnley	Coventry
15:00	Adebola 54'	(Report)		Stadium: Ricoh Arena; Attendance: 19,641; Referee: E Ilderton

4 March 2006 36	Burnley	0–3	Reading	Burnley
15:00		(Report)	Convey 10'; Sonko 55'; Kitson 90'	Stadium: Turf Moor; Attendance: 12,888; Referee: M Jones

11 March 2006 37	Derby County	3–0	Burnley	Derby
15:00	Smith 19'; Idiakez 29'; Moore 34'	(Report)		Stadium: Pride Park Stadium; Attendance: 23,292; Referee: P Joslin

18 March 2006 38	Stoke City	1–0	Burnley	Stoke-on-Trent
15:00	Gallagher 52'	(Report)		Stadium: Britannia Stadium; Attendance: 12,082; Referee: M Fletcher

24 March 2006 39	Burnley	2–0	Norwich City	Burnley
19:45	Gray 18'; Branch 51'	(Report)		Stadium: Turf Moor; Attendance: 11,938; Referee: C Webster

28 March 2006 40	Burnley	1–1	Southampton	Burnley
19:45	Gray 9'	(Report)	Bardsley 1' (o.g.)	Stadium: Turf Moor; Attendance: 10,636; Referee: A Marriner

1 April 2006 41	Sheffield Wednesday	0–0	Burnley	Sheffield
15:00		(Report)		Stadium: Hillsborough Stadium; Attendance: 24,485; Referee: G Laws

8 April 2006 42	Burnley	1–0	Queens Park Rangers	Burnley
15:00	Gray 79'	(Report)		Stadium: Turf Moor; Attendance: 11,247; Referee: R Oliver

15 April 2006 43	Hull City	0–0	Burnley	Kingston upon Hull
15:00		(Report)		Stadium: KC Stadium; Attendance: 19,926; Referee: D Drysdale

17 April 2006 44	Burnley	0–0	Crystal Palace	Burnley
15:00		(Report)		Stadium: Turf Moor; Attendance: 11,449; Referee: M Dean

22 April 2006 45	Millwall	1–0	Burnley	London
15:00	Williams 45'	(Report)		Stadium: The New Den; Attendance: 7,780; Referee: C Penton

30 April 2006 46	Burnley	1–1	Luton Town	Burnley
13:30	Lafferty 78'	(Report)	Vine 42'	Stadium: Turf Moor; Attendance: 12,473; Referee: R Booth

=== Final league position ===
Pos	Team	Pld	W	D	L	GF	GA	GD	Pts
15	Ipswich Town	46	14	14	18	53	66	−13	56
16	Leicester City	46	13	15	18	51	59	−8	54
17	Burnley	46	14	12	20	46	54	−8	54
18	Hull City	46	12	16	18	49	55	−6	52
19	Sheffield Wednesday	46	13	13	20	39	52	−13	52

Updated to match(es) played on 2 December 2011. Source: RSSSF
Rules for classification: 1) points; 2) goal difference; 3) number of goals scored.

=== League Cup ===
23 August 2005 R1	Burnley	2–1	Carlisle United	Burnley
7:45pm	Duff 52'; Akinbiyi 90'	(Report)	Murray 74'	Stadium: Turf Moor; Attendance: 5,114; Referee: S Mathieson

20 September 2005 R2	Burnley	3–0	Barnsley	Burnley
7:45pm	Lowe 28'; Akinbiyi 52'; Spicer 59'	(Report)		Stadium: Turf Moor; Attendance: 4,501; Referee: A Penn

25 October 2005 R3	Aston Villa	1–0	Burnley	Birmingham
7:45pm	Phillips 22'	(Report)		Stadium: Villa Park; Attendance: 26,872; Referee: U Rennie

=== FA Cup ===
7 January 2006 R3	Derby County	2–1	Burnley	Derby
3:00pm	Peschisolido 18', 67'	(Report)	G. O'Connor 29'	Stadium: Pride Park Stadium; Attendance: 12,713; Referee: M Jones
