= Alan Judge (Irish footballer) =

Irish footballer

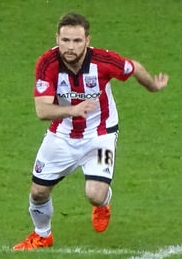
- Judge playing for Brentford in 2015

Personal information
- Full name: Alan Christopher Judge
- Date of birth: 11 November 1988 (age 38)
- Place of birth: Dublin, Ireland
- Height: 1.69 m (5 ft 7 in)
- Positions: Attacking midfielder; winger

Youth career
- 2005–2006: St Joseph's Boys
- 2006–2008: Blackburn Rovers

Senior career*
Years	Team	Apps	(Gls)
2008–2011	Blackburn Rovers	0	(0)
2009	→ Plymouth Argyle (loan)	17	(2)
2009–2010	→ Plymouth Argyle (loan)	37	(5)
2010–2011	→ Notts County (loan)	12	(0)
2011–2013	Notts County	89	(16)
2013–2014	Blackburn Rovers	11	(0)
2014	→ Brentford (loan)	22	(7)
2014–2019	Brentford	108	(18)
2019–2021	Ipswich Town	83	(7)
2021–2023	Colchester United	45	(3)
2024	Woking	3	(0)
2024	Woking	5	(0)
2025	Braintree Town	19	(0)
Total		451	(58)

International career
2004–2005	Republic of Ireland U17	5	(2)
2005–2006	Republic of Ireland U18	3	(0)
2006–2007	Republic of Ireland U19	11	(1)
2007–2010	Republic of Ireland U21	13	(2)
2008	Republic of Ireland U23	4	(0)
2016–2019	Republic of Ireland	9	(1)
- * Club domestic league appearances and goals

Alan Christopher Judge (born 11 November 1988) is an Irish former professional footballer who played as a midfielder. He is a former Republic of Ireland national team international player.

Judge began his career at Blackburn Rovers and returned to the club in 2013 after a two-and-a-half season spell with Notts County. Judge spent the second half of the 2013–14 season on loan at Brentford in League One, before signing for the club permanently in the summer of 2014. He stayed at Brentford for 5 years before joining Ipswich Town in 2019. Judge represented the Republic of Ireland at youth level and made his senior international debut in March 2016.

== Club career ==
=== Blackburn Rovers ===
Born in Dublin, County Dublin, Judge began his career at St. Joseph's Boys in Sallynoggin and appeared for the club's Senior Boys team. In 2006, Judge joined the academy at Premier League club Blackburn Rovers. He turned professional at age 17 and was a part of the reserve team which won the 2006–07 Lancashire Senior Cup. He made his debut for the senior team as a substitute in a 4–1 League Cup second round win over Grimsby Town on 27 August 2008 and his first start followed in a narrow FA Cup third round victory over Blyth Spartans on 5 January 2009. Three weeks later, he signed a new contract running until the end of the 2010–11 season. Judge spent the majority of the following two years away on loan and departed Ewood Park in January 2011.

==== Plymouth Argyle (loans) ====
Judge joined Championship club Plymouth Argyle on loan on 29 January 2009, for the remainder of the 2008–09 season. He featured regularly in the starting XI for then manager Paul Sturrock's team and scored the first senior goal of his career against Burnley in March. The season ended with Judge having made 17 appearances in all competitions.

Judge rejoined Argyle on loan for the duration of the 2009–10 season. He continued to feature regularly in the first-team and scored his first brace in senior football with two goals in an impressive 4–1 win over Reading on 28 December. The Pilgrims were relegated from the Championship at the end of the season and Judge returned to Blackburn. He made 40 appearances and scored five goals during his second spell. In 2013, the Plymouth Herald named Judge as Argyle's fifth best-ever loan signing.

=== Notts County ===
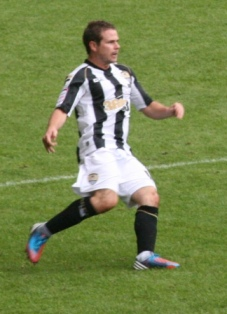
Judge playing for Notts County in 2012

On 31 August 2010, Judge signed a six-month loan deal with League One club Notts County. His loan expired on 1 January 2011, but County re-signed Judge on a further one-month loan so he would be available for forthcoming matches whilst a permanent deal was finalised. On 14 January 2011, Judge completed a permanent move to Notts County and signed a two-and-a-half-year contract with the club for an undisclosed fee. Just days after signing, Judge broke a metatarsal bone in his right foot in a match against Hartlepool United. After a seven-week spell on the sidelines, Judge returned to action against Swindon Town and scored to set County on their way to a 2–1 comeback victory. He made 21 appearances and scored one goal during the 2010–11 season.

Judge scored his first goal of the 2011–12 season in a 3–1 away win against Chesterfield. His form saw him pick up consecutive player of the month awards for November and December respectively. He flourished under manager Martin Allen and finished the season with 8 goals and 13 assists. Judge scooped both the Notts County Players' Player of the Year and Supporters' Player of the Year awards for the 2011–12 season.

Judge scored his first goal in the 2012–13 season in a 2–0 win over Bury on 1 September 2012. In February 2013 and playing under his sixth different manager since arriving at Meadow Lane, Judge revealed he was "sick" of the high turnover of managers and captain Neal Bishop backed up Judge's comments. Despite his unrest, Judge's performances throughout the 2012–13 season saw him named in the League One PFA Team of the Year. He finished the season with 43 appearances and eight goals. On 27 April 2013, it was announced that Judge would depart Meadow Lane upon the expiry of his contract at the end of the 2012–13 season.

=== Return to Blackburn Rovers ===
Judge re-signed for Blackburn Rovers, now in the Championship, on 1 July 2013. He signed a three-year contract on a free transfer. He scored his first Blackburn goal in a 3–3 League Cup first round shootout defeat to Carlisle United on 7 August 2013 and made 12 appearances during the 2013–14 season. Despite manager Gary Bowyer stating that Judge was in his plans, Judge spent the second half of the 2013–14 season away on loan and departed Ewood Park in June 2014, after making just 14 appearances and scoring one goal during four years with the club as a first team player.

=== Brentford ===
==== 2013–14 ====
On 8 January 2014, Judge joined League One club Brentford on loan for the remainder of the 2013–14 season. He featured as a regular starter and scored his first Bees goal on his fourth appearance, netting the second in a 3–1 win over Bristol City on 28 January. On 18 April, Judge scored the penalty which saw Brentford beat Preston North End 1–0 at Griffin Park, to confirm the Bees' promotion to the Championship with three games to spare. He scored his seventh goal of the campaign in a 2–0 win over Stevenage on the final day. He made 22 appearances during his spell with the Bees and on 2 June 2014, Judge signed for Brentford permanently on a three-year contract for an undisclosed fee, effective 1 July 2014.

==== 2014–15 ====
Judge began the 2014–15 Championship season in a defensive midfield role alongside Jonathan Douglas, with Alex Pritchard having assumed his attacking role on the left side of midfield. He scored his first goal of the season on his twentieth appearance, sliding home the opener in a 4–0 demolition of Wolverhampton Wanderers at Griffin Park on 29 November. Judge missed his first league game of the season on 10 January 2015, after having been forced off with a knee injury during the previous week's 2–0 FA Cup third round defeat to Brighton & Hove Albion. After over four months without a goal, Judge scored a free kick to help send the Bees on the way to a 4–1 victory over West London rivals Fulham at Craven Cottage on 3 April. A successful season ended in defeat to Middlesbrough in the playoff semi-finals, with Judge having made 41 appearances and scored three goals.

==== 2015–16 and injury ====
Judge scored his first goal of the 2015–16 season on 15 August 2015, when he cancelled out Jonathan Kodjia's opener to send Brentford on the way to a 4–2 comeback victory over Bristol City and he was retrospectively credited with a second goal in the same match. Three goals and four assists during a four-match winning run in October won Judge the Championship Player of the Month award. Another six goals through to January 2016 led to his nomination for the Football League Player of the Year award at the 2016 London Football Awards. Judge's season came to a premature end on 9 April 2016, when he suffered multiple breaks in his left leg after being "felled by sickening challenge" from Ipswich Town's Luke Hyam. He scored a seasonal-best 14 goals during the 2015–16 season and also led the club in assists for the second-successive season.

At the 2016 Football League Awards, Judge was shortlisted for the Championship Player of the Year award and was named in the Football League Team of the Year. He was also named in the Championship PFA Team of the Year at the PFA Awards and won the Brentford Supporters' and Players' Player of the Year awards. Judge signed a new two-year contract on 29 March 2017 and underwent further surgery to improve the healing of the bone shortly afterwards.

==== Recovery and 2017–18 ====
Judge returned to first team training in early November 2017 and made his playing comeback for Brentford B versus Barnet U23 on 5 December, scoring an early penalty in a 45-minute appearance. He was named in the first team squad for the first time in the 2017–18 season on 26 December, but remained an unused substitute during a 2–1 victory over Aston Villa. He subsequently spent time out of the squad due to illness and requiring extra training and he had to wait until 6 January 2018 for his comeback, which came with a 20-minute substitute cameo late in the second half of a 1–0 FA Cup third round defeat to former club Notts County. He was used in a substitute role through to the end of the season and made 14 appearances without scoring.

==== 2018–19 and departure ====
Judge began the 2018–19 season as a substitute in league matches and started in each of Brentford's three EFL Cup matches. On 26 September 2018, he scored his first goal in over two and a half years, with what proved to be a consolation in a 3–1 EFL Cup third round defeat to Arsenal. Despite making 24 appearances, a failure to break into the starting line-up led to Judge departing Griffin Park in mid-January 2019. Across his two spells with Brentford, Judge made 140 appearances and scored 26 goals.

=== Ipswich Town ===
==== 2018–19 season ====
On 14 January 2019, Judge joined Championship club Ipswich Town on a contract running until the end of the 2018–19 season, with the option for a further year, for an undisclosed fee. He made his debut for the club five days later away at former club Blackburn Rovers. In what remained of the 2018–19 season, he made 19 appearances as Ipswich suffered relegation to League One. On 5 April, Judge signed a new two-year contract, with the option of a further year.

==== 2019–20 season ====
Over the summer, Judge was linked with a move to Queens Park Rangers, a move which would have resulted in him reuniting with former manager Mark Warburton. On 23 July, manager Paul Lambert admitted in an interview that Judge was keen on the move, but insisted that Ipswich would play hardball for him, considering he signed a new contract just a few months before. This prompted a negative response from the Ipswich fans who questioned his loyalty, but after a third bid was rejected, QPR dropped their interest and he remained at the club. On 31 August, Judge revealed in an interview that due to family reasons regarding his daughter, the move to QPR did appeal to him – but did state that he understood the fans disappointment in him initially wanting to leave.

After almost 11 months at the club, Judge scored his first goal for The Tractor Boys on 20 November 2019, netting a 94th-minute winner in a 0–1 away win over Lincoln City at Sincil Bank in the FA Cup – marking the club's first FA Cup win in almost a decade. He scored his first league goal on 11 January 2020, scoring the third goal in a 4–1 home win over Accrington Stanley at Portman Road. On 15 February, Judge scored a brace in a 4–1 win over Burton Albion. He scored 4 goals in 36 appearances in all competitions before the season was suspended due to the Coronavirus outbreak.

==== 2020–21 season ====
Judge scored his first goal of the 2020–21 season in a 2–3 loss to Swindon Town on 9 January. On 6 February, he scored the opening goal in a 2–0 win against Blackpool, netting with a shot from outside the penalty area. In February 2021, Judge was involved in an altercation with referee Darren Drysdale during Ipswich's goalless League One draw with Northampton Town, after Judge, who had protested about being penalized for simulation, was shown a yellow card, the fifth booking of the match. The pair "squared up" before Drysdale was ushered away by Northampton's Lloyd Jones. Drysdale would later issue an apology to Judge and was handed a backdated ban by the FA, but later accused Judge of referring to him as "bald" and a "cunt" – an allegation Judge angrily denied.

On 16 April 2021, the club announced that Judge would not be offered a new deal and would be leaving the club at the end of the season after his contract expired. Manager Paul Cook confirmed that Judge would not play in any of the 6 remaining games of the season as another start for Judge would have automatically triggered a one-year contract extension. Judge was prepared to change the terms of his contract in order to continue playing but it was agreed by both parties it would be best not to put Judge at risk of sustaining an injury in the remainder of the 2020–21 season. He finished his Ipswich career having made 91 appearances in all competitions, scoring 8 goals.

=== Colchester United ===
On 18 June 2021, Judge joined Colchester United on free transfer, signing a two-year contract with the club. The move made him the fourth player that was released from Ipswich that summer to join Colchester, alongside Cole Skuse, Luke Chambers and Freddie Sears. He made his competitive debut for the club on 7 August 2021 in a 0–0 away draw at Carlisle United. He scored his first goal for the U's on 10 September, tapping in Freddie Sears' cross in Colchester's 3–2 win at Barrow. On 14 December 2022, Judge was ruled out for the season following a triple rupture in his left knee.

Judge was released by Colchester United at the end of the 2022–23 season. During the 2023–24 campaign, he played his first game since his injury for the Colchester United U21s side. Judge played an hour for Colchester's under-21 team in their 6–2 win over Bristol City U21s, in their Professional Development League Two game.

=== Woking ===
On 22 March 2024, Judge joined National League side Woking on a deal until the end of the campaign. On 26 April 2024, after just featuring three times for the club it was announced that Judge would leave Woking at the end of his contract in June.

On 5 November 2024, following his departure just five months prior, Judge returned to the Cardinals. He departed the club following the expiry of his contract on 31 December 2024.

=== Braintree Town ===
On 25 January 2025, Judge agreed to join fellow National League side, Braintree Town following his release from Woking.

=== Retirement ===
On 3 November 2025, Judge announced his retirement from professional football at the age of 36.

== International career ==
=== Youth ===
Judge made his international debut with the Republic of Ireland U17 team in October 2004, winning five caps and scoring two goals during the team's failed 2005 European U17 Championship qualifying campaign. He represented the U18 side at the 2005 European Youth Olympic Festival in Lignano Sabbiadoro, Italy. A 4–2 victory over Switzerland in the third-place playoff saw the U18s win the bronze medal. Judge made his U19 debut in a 2–1 friendly win over Ukraine at Terryland Park on 15 August 2006. He was a regular for the U19s during their qualifying campaign for the 2007 European U19 Championship and scored his first goal in a 2–1 qualifying win away to Macedonia on 6 October 2006. Judge appeared in all three of the U18s' elite qualification games, but despite victories over Bulgaria and Hungary, defeat to Germany saw the Germans qualify for the finals. Judge also represented the U19s in the 2007 Oporto Tournament in Portugal, but went home without any silverware.

Judge made his U21 debut in a 3–2 friendly victory over Sweden on 12 October 2007, coming on as a substitute for Jim O'Brien after 68 minutes. Judge made two appearances during the U21s' unsuccessful 2009 UEFA U21 Championship qualifying campaign. He appeared in all of the qualifying games for the 2011 UEFA U21 Championship, with an early goal scored in a 1–1 draw with Georgia being the sole highlight of a campaign which saw the U21s finish bottom of their group. He won 13 U21 caps and scored two goals. Judge made four appearances for the U23s in the 2008 Inter Continental Cup, but came away without the trophy.

=== Senior ===
Judge's form in the Championship with Brentford saw him named in provisional Republic of Ireland squads in May, August and October 2015 and he was finally named in a matchday squad for a crucial Euro 2016 qualifying playoff first leg match versus Bosnia and Herzegovina on 13 November 2015. He was an unused substitute during the 1–1 draw. Judge made his debut with a start in a friendly versus Switzerland on 25 March 2016 and played the full 90 minutes of the 1–0 victory. He scored his first senior international goal on his fourth appearance, with the winner in a 2–1 friendly victory over the United States on 2 June 2018.

In June 2019, Judge was called up for European qualifiers against Denmark and Gibraltar. He featured as a second-half substitute in a 1–1 draw with Denmark, assisting the Republic of Ireland's equalizing goal with a free-kick converted by Shane Duffy. He broke his wrist in the same match following a tackle in stoppage time. He was again called up in September, appearing as a substitute in a 1–1 draw with Switzerland at the Aviva Stadium on 5 September. Five days later he started in a 3–1 friendly home win over Bulgaria.

== Style of play ==
Judge is known for his energy and his driving runs, as well as his ability to score spectacular long range goals. Then-Brentford teammate Maxime Colin commented that Judge "feels the football and he has a really good kick, good cross. He never gives up. He gives a lot of strength and power. He's not afraid".

== Personal life ==
Judge's father Dermot played for Shamrock Rovers and captained Bray Wanderers to success in the 1990 FAI Cup Final.

== Career statistics ==
=== Club ===
Appearances and goals by club, season and competition
Club	Season	League			FA Cup		League Cup		Other		Total	
Club	Season	Division	Apps	Goals	Apps	Goals	Apps	Goals	Apps	Goals	Apps	Goals
Blackburn Rovers	2008–09	Premier League	0	0	1	0	1	0	—		2	0
Blackburn Rovers	2009–10	Premier League	0	0	0	0	0	0	—		0	0
Blackburn Rovers	2010–11	Premier League	0	0	0	0	0	0	—		0	0
Blackburn Rovers	Total		0	0	1	0	1	0	0	0	2	0
Plymouth Argyle (loan)	2008–09	Championship	17	2	0	0	0	0	—		17	2
Plymouth Argyle (loan)	2009–10	Championship	37	5	2	0	1	0	—		40	5
Plymouth Argyle (loan)	Total		54	7	2	0	1	0	0	0	57	7
Notts County (loan)	2010–11	League One	19	1	1	0	1	0	0	0	21	1
Notts County	2011–12	League One	43	7	4	1	0	0	1 (Note: Appearance in Football League Trophy)	0	48	8
Notts County	2012–13	League One	39	8	3	0	1	0	0	0	43	8
Notts County	Total		101	16	8	1	2	0	1	0	112	17
Blackburn Rovers	2013–14	Championship	11	0	0	0	1	1	—		12	1
Brentford (loan)	2013–14	League One	22	7	0	0	0	0	0	0	22	7
Brentford	2014–15	Championship	37	3	1	0	1	0	2 (Note: Appearances in Championship play-offs)	0	41	3
Brentford	2015–16	Championship	38	14	1	0	0	0	—		39	14
Brentford	2016–17	Championship	0	0	0	0	0	0	—		0	0
Brentford	2017–18	Championship	13	0	1	0	0	0	—		14	0
Brentford	2018–19	Championship	20	1	1	0	3	1	—		24	2
Brentford	Total		130	25	4	0	4	1	2	0	140	26
Ipswich Town	2018–19	Championship	19	0	0	0	0	0	—		19	0
Ipswich Town	2019–20	League One	30	3	3	1	1	0	0	0	34	4
Ipswich Town	2020–21	League One	34	4	1	0	2	0	1 (Note: Appearance(s) in EFL Trophy)	0	38	4
Ipswich Town	Total		83	7	4	1	3	0	1	0	91	8
Colchester United	2021–22	League Two	32	3	1	0	1	0	3	0	37	3
Colchester United	2022–23	League Two	13	0	1	0	0	0	4	0	13	0
Colchester United	Total		45	3	2	0	1	0	7	0	50	3
Woking	2023–24	National League	3	0	0	0	—		0	0	3	0
Woking	2024–25	National League	5	0	0	0	—		3 (Note: One appearance in FA Trophy; Two appearances in National League Cup)	0	8	0
Woking	Total		8	0	0	0	—		3	0	11	0
Braintree Town	2024–25	National League	13	0	0	0	—		0	0	13	0
Braintree Town	2025–26	National League	6	0	0	0	—		0	0	6	0
Braintree Town	Total		19	0	0	0	0	0	0	0	19	0
Career total			451	58	21	2	13	2	14	0	499	62

=== International ===
Appearances and goals by national team and year
National team	Year	Apps	Goals
Republic of Ireland	2016	1	0
Republic of Ireland	2018	4	1
Republic of Ireland	2019	4	0
Total		9	1

As of match played 2 June 2018. Republic of Ireland score listed first, score column indicates score after each Judge goal.

International goals by date, venue, cap, opponent, score, result and competition
No.	Date	Venue	Cap	Opponent	Score	Result	Competition	Ref
1	2 June 2018	Aviva Stadium, Dublin, Ireland	4	United States	2–1	2–1	Friendly	

== Honours ==
Brentford

- Football League One runner-up: 2013–14

Republic of Ireland U18

- European Youth Olympic Festival: 2005 (Bronze)

Individual

- PFA Team of the Year: 2012–13 League One, 2015–16 Championship
- The Football League Team of the Season: 2015–16
- Football League Championship Player of the Month: October 2015
- Brentford Supporters' Player of the Year: 2015–16
- Brentford Players' Player of the Year: 2015–16
- Notts County Supporters' Player of the Year: 2011–12
- Notts County Players' Player of the Year: 2011–12
- Notts County Player of the Month: November 2011, December 2011
