= Jon Harley =

English footballer (born 1979)

Personal information
- Full name: Jonathan Harley
- Date of birth: 26 September 1979 (age 47)
- Place of birth: Maidstone, England
- Height: 5 ft 9 in (1.75 m)
- Position: Left-back

Team information
- Current team: Portsmouth (assistant manager)

Youth career
- ?–1997: Chelsea

Senior career*
Years	Team	Apps	(Gls)
1997–2001	Chelsea	30	(2)
2000	→ Wimbledon (loan)	6	(2)
2001–2004	Fulham	25	(1)
2002–2003	→ Sheffield United (loan)	9	(1)
2003	→ Sheffield United (loan)	5	(0)
2004	→ West Ham United (loan)	15	(1)
2004–2005	Sheffield United	48	(2)
2005	→ Burnley (loan)	2	(0)
2005–2008	Burnley	117	(3)
2008–2010	Watford	75	(2)
2010–2012	Notts County	53	(0)
2011–2012	→ Rotherham United (loan)	12	(0)
2012–2013	Portsmouth	23	(1)
2013	Maidstone United	6	(0)
Total		426	(15)

International career
1995–1997	England U16	4	(0)
2000	England U21	3	(0)
- * Club domestic league appearances and goals

Jon Harley (born 26 September 1979) is an English professional football coach and former player. He is assistant manager of EFL Championship club Portsmouth.

A left-back, he played for Chelsea and Fulham in the Premier League, Wimbledon, Sheffield United, West Ham United, Burnley, Watford, Notts County Rotherham United and Portsmouth in the Football League, and in the Isthmian League for Maidstone United.

== Early life ==
Born in Maidstone, Kent, Harley grew up in the Maidstone suburb of Allington, attending Oakwood Park Grammar School and playing for the local junior team Castle Colts.

== Career ==
=== Chelsea ===
Harley started his career with Chelsea, making his debut against Derby County in April 1998. Despite some impressive performances, especially in the 1999–2000 season, during which he was a member of Chelsea's FA Cup winning squad, albeit as an unused substitute in the final, he was unable to establish himself in the London side. He ultimately made 42 appearances for Chelsea and scored two goals, both of which were winners in the 1999–2000 FA Premier League against future club Watford and Leeds United. He also had a loan spell with Wimbledon, where he scored twice, both goals coming in a 4–0 win over Crewe Alexandra on his debut. In his final season at Chelsea, Harley was third choice behind Celestine Babayaro and Graeme Le Saux.

=== Fulham ===
He signed for newly promoted Fulham in August 2001 for £3.5million. Harley was equally unable to establish himself in the Fulham side, despite a somewhat outstanding goal against Aston Villa, in which he beat Peter Enckelman with a 40-yard strike. This was the only goal he achieved in 19 league starts over three seasons. He joined Sheffield United and later West Ham United on loan where he scored once, in a 3–3 draw against Sheffield United on his debut.

=== Sheffield United ===
He joined Sheffield United permanently in June 2004 on a free transfer, playing regularly and scoring two goals.

=== Burnley ===
A year later he moved to Burnley in a deal for just £75,000 initially, with further payments linked to first-team appearances.

Harley managed to establish himself as the club's first choice left-back, starting with a series of impressive performances. He is known for his attacking intent and often gets forward to offer support down the left-wing. Harley is also an excellent set-piece taker and was vital to many of Burnley's free-kick 'routines'. Despite his ability his form dipped mid-season, but later recovered to end the campaign with a number of solid performances, culminating in his winning the "Player of the Season" award. He remained almost ever-present during his second season with Burnley.

At the start of the 2007–08 season, Harley found himself playing in the unaccustomed position of left-sided midfielder or on the bench, replaced by new signing Stephen Jordan. An injury to Jordan allowed him to regain his place and this coincided with a run of much-improved results for Burnley. On 9 March 2008, however, Harley failed to agree a new deal with Burnley, signalling his intent to leave the club during the following summer.

=== Watford ===
On 17 July 2008 Harley signed a two-year deal with Watford. On 4 October 2008 he scored his first Watford league goal, scoring in the 12th minute in a home game against Preston North End. Watford went on to win the game 2–1.

=== Notts County ===
On 14 July 2010, Harley signed for the Football League Two Champions Notts County on a two-year deal and established himself as a regular member of the team in the 2010–11 season. In September 2011 he turned out for Australian A-League side Melbourne Victory in a bid to win a full-time contract, the move, however, fell through. In October 2011, he joined League Two side Rotherham United on a one-month emergency loan, which was then extended in November to last until January 2012.

In May 2012 he was released by the club, along with 12 other players.

=== Portsmouth ===
On 16 August 2012, Harley signed for League One club Portsmouth on a short-term contract. Harley made his debut in a League One match against AFC Bournemouth, the match ended 1–1. He scored his only goal for Portsmouth in a 2–1 defeat away to Stevenage on 24 October 2012. He was released alongside five other players on 15 January 2013.

=== Maidstone United ===
On 13 March 2013, Harley signed for his hometown club Maidstone United on a non-contract basis, combining his time with the semi-professional club with working as a youth coach for the Chelsea Academy.

=== Portsmouth ===
Jon Harley was appointed as assistant head coach to John Mousinho on 16 February 2023.

== Career statistics ==
As of match played 20 April 2013

Appearances and goals by club, season and competition
Club	Season	League			FA Cup		League Cup		Other		Total	
Club	Season	Division	Apps	Goals	Apps	Goals	Apps	Goals	Apps	Goals	Apps	Goals
Chelsea	1997–98	Premier League	3	0	0	0	0	0	0	0	3	0
Chelsea	1998–99	Premier League	0	0	0	0	1	0	0	0	1	0
Chelsea	1999–2000	Premier League	17	2	5	0	0	0	4 (Note: Appearances in UEFA Champions League)	0	26	2
Chelsea	2000–01	Premier League	10	0	2	0	0	0	0	0	12	0
Chelsea	Total		30	2	7	0	1	0	4	0	42	2
Wimbledon (loan)	2000–01	First Division	6	2	0	0	0	0	—		6	2
Fulham	2001–02	Premier League	10	0	1	0	2	0	—		13	0
Fulham	2002–03	Premier League	11	1	4	0	0	0	4 (Note: Appearances in UEFA Intertoto Cup)	0	19	1
Fulham	2003–04	Premier League	4	0	0	0	0	0	—		4	0
Fulham	Total		25	1	5	0	2	0	4	0	36	1
Sheffield United (loan)	2002–03	First Division	9	1	0	0	2	0	0	0	11	1
Sheffield United (loan)	2003–04	First Division	5	0	0	0	0	0	—		5	0
Sheffield United (loan)	Total		14	1	0	0	2	0	0	0	16	1
West Ham United (loan)	2003–04	First Division	15	1	1	0	0	0	0	0	16	1
Sheffield United	2004–05	Championship	44	2	5	0	3	0	—		52	2
Sheffield United	2005–06	Championship	4	0	0	0	0	0	—		4	0
Sheffield United	Total		48	2	5	0	3	0	—		56	2
Burnley (loan)	2005–06	Championship	2	0	0	0	0	0	—		2	0
Burnley	2005–06	Championship	39	2	1	0	2	0	—		42	2
Burnley	2006–07	Championship	45	1	1	0	1	0	—		47	1
Burnley	2007–08	Championship	33	0	1	0	1	0	—		35	0
Burnley	Total		119	3	3	0	4	0	—		126	3
Watford	2008–09	Championship	37	1	2	0	4	0	—		43	0
Watford	2009–10	Championship	38	1	1	0	1	0	—		40	1
Watford	Total		75	2	3	0	5	0	—		83	2
Notts County	2010–11	League One	39	0	4	0	3	0	1 (Note: Appearances in Football League Trophy)	0	47	0
Notts County	2011–12	League One	14	0	1	0	0	0	1	0	16	0
Notts County	Total		53	0	5	0	3	0	2	0	63	0
Rotherham United (loan)	2011–12	League Two	12	0	0	0	0	0	0	0	12	0
Portsmouth	2012–13	League One	23	1	1	0	0	0	2	0	26	1
Maidstone United	2012–13	Isthmian Division One South	6	0	0	0	—		0	0	6	0
Career total			426	15	30	0	20	0	12	0	488	15

== Honours ==
Chelsea

- FA Cup: 1999–2000
