= Carl Regan =

English footballer (born 1980)

Personal information
- Full name: Carl Anthony Regan
- Date of birth: 14 January 1980 (age 46)
- Place of birth: Liverpool, England
- Height: 6 ft 0 in (1.83 m)
- Position: Right-back

Senior career*
Years	Team	Apps	(Gls)
1997–2000	Everton	0	(0)
2000–2002	Barnsley	37	(0)
2002	→ Hull City (loan)	14	(0)
2002–2004	Hull City	24	(0)
2003–2004	→ Chester City (loan)	4	(0)
2004–2005	Droylsden	34	(0)
2005–2006	Chester City	47	(0)
2006–2008	Macclesfield Town	58	(1)
2008–2009	Milton Keynes Dons	36	(1)
2009–2011	Bristol Rovers	56	(0)
2011	→ Notts County (loan)	4	(0)
2011–2012	Shrewsbury Town	13	(0)
2012	Notts County	11	(0)
2013	Bury	10	(0)
Total		348	(2)
- * Club domestic league appearances and goals

Carl Anthony Regan (born 14 January 1980) is an English former professional footballer who played as a right-back.

== Career ==
Regan, who is a right-back, began his career with Everton, but left after being offered a new one-year deal in 2000 without breaking into the first-team. He went on to play for Barnsley, Hull City, Droylsden and Chester City before joining Macclesfield Town in July 2006. At the Silkmen, he made over 60 appearances and scored once against Boston United.

On 31 January 2008 Carl left Macclesfield for League Two rivals Milton Keynes Dons for an undisclosed fee, rejoining ex-Macclesfield manager Paul Ince, as well as several former Silkmen players. His move came just two days after he had played against MK Dons for Macclesfield. At the Dons, he made nearly 50 appearances, scoring once against Lincoln City.

On 5 June 2009 Regan signed a two-year deal at Bristol Rovers having rejected a new contract at MK Dons and made his debut in a 2–1 home defeat against Leyton Orient. Regan subsequently joined Notts County on a short-term loan deal on 23 February 2011, after failing to establish himself in the first team under new manager Dave Penney. He was one of seventeen players released by the team in May 2011.

After trialing for Shrewsbury Town Regan signed for Graham Turner's side on a one-year deal, ahead of their Pre-Season friendly with Tranmere Rovers. Despite being sidelined by injury for most of the first half of the 2011/12 season, Regan was recalled as a substitute in a 2–1 home win against Southend United on 21 January 2012 and kept his place for the next match in a 2–0 away win at Hereford United. In May 2012, Regan was released by the club after being deemed surplus to requirements. He signed for Notts County in August 2012 and scored his first goal for the club against Scunthorpe United in the Football League Trophy on 4 September 2012. He signed for Bury in January 2013.

== Honours ==
- FA Youth Cup: 1998
