= Jake Wholey =

English footballer

Personal information
- Full name: Jake Anthony Wholey
- Date of birth: 14 December 1993 (age 32)
- Place of birth: Nottingham, England
- Height: 5 ft 10 in (1.78 m)
- Position: Defender

Youth career
- Leicester City
- 2010–2013: Notts County

Senior career*
Years	Team	Apps	(Gls)
2011–2013	Notts County	2	(0)
2013	→ Ilkeston (loan)	6	(0)
2013	Ånge	10	(3)
2013	Ånge 2	1	(0)
2014–2015	Nottingham Forest	0	(0)
2015	Grantham Town		
2015	Basford United		
- * Club domestic league appearances and goals as of 16:34, 2 May 2013 (UTC)

Jake Anthony Wholey (born 1993) is an English footballer who plays as a left back.

== Career ==
Wholey started his career in the youth side with Leicester City. In the summer of 2010 he joined Notts County and made his professional debut on 16 April 2011, in the Football League One 2–0 defeat to Bournemouth at Meadow Lane, coming on as a second-half substitute for Ricky Ravenhill. In February 2013, Wholey joined Ilkeston on loan in the Northern Premier League Premier Division, making six appearances in all competitions. In the summer of 2013 Wholey moved to Swedish Division 3 club Ånge IF. He played for Ånge with his former Notts County teammate Lewis Whiteley.
