= Luke Hubbins =

English footballer

Personal information
- Full name: Luke Anthony Hubbins
- Date of birth: 11 September 1991 (age 35)^{[A]}
- Place of birth: Birmingham, England
- Height: 5 ft 10 in (1.78 m)
- Position: Winger

Youth career
- ?–2003: Cadbury Athletic Juniors
- 2003–2010: Birmingham City

Senior career*
Years	Team	Apps	(Gls)
2010–2012	Birmingham City	0	(0)
2010–2011	→ Notts County (loan)	0	(0)
2012	→ Tamworth (loan)	1	(0)
2012–2013	AFC Telford United	32	(2)
2013	Worcester City	5	(0)
2014–2015	Leamington	0	(0)
2015–2016	Tamworth	10	(0)
- * Club domestic league appearances and goals

Luke Anthony Hubbins (born 11 September 1991^{[A]}) is an English retired footballer. He began his career with Birmingham City, but made his professional debut in August 2010 in the Football League Cup while on loan to Notts County, and also spent a brief spell on loan to Conference National club Tamworth. He never played for Birmingham's first team, and was released at the end of the 2011–12 season, when he signed for AFC Telford United of the Conference. He played either as a winger or at right back.

== Playing career ==
=== Early career ===
Hubbins, from the Weoley Castle district of Birmingham, played for junior club Cadbury Athletic from under-9s to under-13s before joining Birmingham City's Academy in 2003. As a 16-year-old he appeared for the club's reserve team, and in 2009 he scored the late goal which took the academy team through to the semi-final of the FA Youth Cup for the first time since 1985. According to the Birmingham Mail, he "won a 50–50 and broke down the inside-right channel and placed a shot high into the net, making light of the difficulty caused by the ball bobbling up as he went through."

Described as "a pacey, tricky winger who is not afraid of taking on a full-back while still having an eye for goal", Hubbins was included in the first-team squad for friendly matches before the 2009–10 season. In July 2010, Hubbins signed his first one-year professional contract.

=== Notts County (loan) ===
Prior to the 2010–11 season, Hubbins joined Notts County, newly promoted to League One, on trial. He was recommended by Birmingham Academy coach, and former player for both clubs, Phil Robinson. The trial was successful and the player joined on loan until 18 January 2011, linking up with Birmingham teammate Jake Jervis, also on loan at County. Hubbins made his debut for the club on 24 August 2010 in the starting eleven for the Football League Cup second-round tie away to Watford. He played 59 minutes as his club won 2–1. He started in the Football League Trophy defeat to Sheffield Wednesday the following week, but made no more first-team appearances before the loan expired.

=== Return to Birmingham ===
At the end of the 2010–11 season, Hubbins signed a six-month contract extension. He was named among the substitutes for four first-team matches in the early part of the campaign in the UEFA Europa League and the Championship, never taking the field. His performances for the reserves earned him a further contract extension for the remainder of the season.

On 24 January 2012, Hubbins joined Conference National club Tamworth on loan until 19 February. He made his debut the same day in a 3–0 league defeat to Ebbsfleet United, and was the Tamworth Herald's "star man" despite having to leave the field after an hour with a hamstring injury predicted to keep him out for a month.

He made no further first-team appearances, and was released by Birmingham when his contract expired at the end of the 2011–12 season.

=== AFC Telford United ===
Hubbins signed for Conference National club AFC Telford United on 18 May 2012. He left the club on 2 May 2013.

=== Worcester City ===
Hubbins signed for another Conference National club, Worcester City, on 31 July 2013, but in mid-September he decided to leave and take a break from the game.

=== Leamington ===
On 11 August 2014, Hubbins made a return to football, and signed for Conference North side Leamington. He left the club at the end of that season after the expiry of his contract.

== Personal life ==
Hubbins converted to Islam in 2007 and became a Muslim although he was a Christian before.

== Notes ==
A. ^{a} ^{b} Several different published dates of birth exist for Mr Hubbins. Soccerbase and UEFA list 17 December 1992. ESPN lists 12 May 1992, and the Birmingham City F.C. website also used to list that date, but they later changed it to 11 September 1991. Soccerway also lists 11 September 1991.
