= John Spicer (footballer) =

English footballer

Personal information
- Full name: John William Spicer
- Date of birth: 13 September 1983 (age 43)
- Place of birth: Romford, England
- Height: 5 ft 11 in (1.80 m)
- Position: Midfielder

Youth career
- ?–2001: Arsenal

Senior career*
Years	Team	Apps	(Gls)
2001–2004	Arsenal	0	(0)
2004	→ AFC Bournemouth (loan)	14	(2)
2004–2005	AFC Bournemouth	29	(4)
2005–2008	Burnley	69	(4)
2008–2010	Doncaster Rovers	50	(1)
2010	→ Leyton Orient (loan)	9	(1)
2010–2012	Notts County	24	(2)
2012–2013	Southend United	13	(0)
Total		208	(14)

International career
1999–2000	England U16	11	(0)
2003	England U20	2	(0)
- * Club domestic league appearances and goals

John William Spicer (born 13 September 1983 in Romford, Greater London) is an English former professional footballer.

== Career ==
He started his career with Arsenal, but could only manage a single League Cup appearance, as a substitute against Rotherham United on 28 October 2003. Arsenal won the tie 9–8 on penalties with Spicer converting his spot kick. He later went on a four-month loan spell at AFC Bournemouth, starting on 10 September 2004.

At Bournemouth, he played 19 games and scored four goals; impressed with his form, Bournemouth signed him permanently on 17 December. He played another 31 games and scored a further four goals for the League One club over the next eight months.

This form earned him a £35,000 move to Burnley (who capitalized on a get-out clause in his contract with Bournemouth) at the start of the 2005–06 season, joining them on 27 August 2005.

The highlight of Spicer's first season at Burnley was taking over as goalkeeper after Burnley's Brian Jensen was sent off in a match at Luton Town. Despite having no previous experience as a goalkeeper, Spicer played well enough during his hour in goal to ensure a 3–2 victory.

Spicer spent the 2006–07 season as a squad player; his most significant contribution that season being the only goal in a victory at Birmingham City.

In the 2007–08 season Spicer once again started as a substitute but forced his way into the team before an injury allowed other midfielders to stake their claim at a time which coincided with much-improved Burnley results. He joined Doncaster Rovers in June 2008. He scored his first goal for the club in the 3–0 victory over Plymouth Argyle in the game which secured Doncaster's place in the Championship for a second year running.

In July 2009, it was announced that Spicer would change his shirt number with Doncaster Rovers, switching from number 20 to number 10, which had been vacated by the departure of Gareth Taylor.

In March 2010 he went on loan to Leyton Orient. He scored his first goal for the club against Southampton on 5 April 2010.

In May 2010, Doncaster announced that he was one of 6 players who would not be offered new contracts. On 2 July 2010, Spicer signed a two-year deal with League 1 club Notts County. On 10 August, he scored his first goal for Notts County in a Football League Cup tie against Plymouth Argyle which County won 1–0.

In May 2012, he was released by the club, along with 12 other players.

On 17 August 2012, Spicer signed a one-year deal with Southend United after impressing during a pre-season trial. He made his debut on Saturday 18 August 2012 as a substitute in the 1–0 defeat against Accrington Stanley. In October 2012, Spicer got sent off in a defeat at home to Burton Albion for lunging into a two-footed challenge.

== Career statistics ==
As of match played 19 March 2013.

Club statistics
Club	Season	League			FA Cup		League Cup		Other		Total	
Club	Season	Division	Apps	Goals	Apps	Goals	Apps	Goals	Apps	Goals	Apps	Goals
Arsenal	2001–02	Premier League	0	0	0	0	0	0	0	0	0	0
Arsenal	2002–03	Premier League	0	0	0	0	0	0	0	0	0	0
Arsenal	2003–04	Premier League	0	0	0	0	1	0	0	0	1	0
Arsenal	Total		0	0	0	0	1	0	0	0	1	0
AFC Bournemouth	2004–05	League One	39	6	5	1	2	1	0	0	46	8
AFC Bournemouth	2005–06	League One	4	0	0	0	0	0	0	0	4	0
AFC Bournemouth	Total		43	6	5	1	2	1	0	0	50	8
Burnley	2005–06	Championship	34	3	0	0	2	1	—		36	4
Burnley	2006–07	Championship	11	1	0	0	0	0	—		11	1
Burnley	2007–08	Championship	24	0	0	0	3	0	—		27	0
Burnley	Total		69	4	0	0	5	1	—		74	5
Doncaster Rovers	2008–09	Championship	30	1	4	0	1	0	—		35	1
Doncaster Rovers	2009–10	Championship	20	0	1	0	2	0	—		23	0
Doncaster Rovers	Total		50	1	5	0	3	0	—		58	1
Leyton Orient (loan)	2009–10	League One	9	1	0	0	0	0	0	0	9	1
Notts County	2010–11	League One	23	2	1	0	2	1	1 (Note: Appearance(s) in Football League Trophy)	0	27	3
Notts County	2011–12	League One	1	0	0	0	0	0	1	0	2	0
Notts County	Total		24	2	1	0	2	1	2	0	29	3
Southend United	2012–13	League Two	13	0	0	0	0	0	2	0	15	0
Career total			208	14	11	1	13	3	4	0	236	18
