= 2012–13 Hereford United F.C. season =

Hereford United F.C.
2012–13 season
- Chairman: David Keyte
- Manager: Martin Foyle
- Conference Premier: 6th
- FA Cup: Second round (replay)
- FA Trophy: Second round
- Highest home attendance: 5,026 v Cheltenham Town, FA Cup, 11 December 2012
- Lowest home attendance: 662 v Dartford, Conference Premier, 26 March 2013
- Average home league attendance: 1,752
- Biggest win: 4–0 v AFC Telford United (A), Conference Premier, 20 April 2013
- Biggest defeat: 0–4 v Dartford (A), Conference Premier, 15 September 2012
Home colours	Away colours

The 2012–13 season was the 92nd competitive season of Hereford United Football Club and 10th overall in the Conference Premier, following their relegation from League Two in the previous season. The club also competed in both the FA Cup and the FA Trophy.

== Season summary ==
Following Hereford's relegation, Richard O'Kelly resigned as manager and was replaced by Martin Foyle. Vice-chairman Tim Russon also resigned from the board on 23 May 2012.

Hereford kicked off their season with a Friday night fixture at Edgar Street against Macclesfield Town, also relegated from League Two, beating the Cheshire side 2–1.

Hereford reached the second round of the FA Cup, knocking out arch rivals Shrewsbury Town, then in League One, along the way. Drawing League Two club Cheltenham Town in the second round, Hereford took their higher graded opponents to a replay at Edgar Street before losing 2–1 via an extra time goal.

In the FA Trophy, Hereford defeated fellow Conference Premier club Ebbsfleet United in the first round, before hosting Chelmsford City of the Conference South, one league below, in the second round. Their opponents produced an upset, comfortably winning the tie 3–0 and knocking Hereford out.

The club's financial difficulties grew bigger during the season and in October, David Keyte suggested that unless Hereford found fresh investment, the club could enter administration. Their situation was slightly eased in November with an outstanding tax bill paid off using £70,000 received from their televised FA Cup fixture against Cheltenham.

Hereford ended the season strongly, winning five of their last eight fixtures, losing only once. They finished one place outside the play-offs in sixth but were still ten points off Wrexham immediately above them.

Hereford's financial woes continued after the playing season had ended as the club announced that players' wages would not be paid for April.

== First-team squad ==
As of 20 April 2013

No.	Name	Nat.	Date of Birth	Notes
Goalkeepers
1	James Bittner	(England)	2 February 1982 (aged 31)	
12	Dan Hanford	(Wales)	6 March 1991 (aged 22)	
Defenders
2	Andy Gallinagh	(England)	16 March 1985 (aged 28)	
3	Joe Heath	(England)	4 October 1988 (aged 24)	
4	Joe Connor	(England)	1 February 1986 (aged 27)	On loan from Stockport County
5	Michael Townsend	(England)	17 May 1986 (aged 26)	
6	Luke Graham	(England)	27 April 1986 (aged 26)	
8	Chris Carruthers	(England)	19 August 1983 (aged 29)	
14	Stefan Stam	(Netherlands)	14 September 1979 (aged 33)	
26	Rod McDonald	(England)	11 April 1992 (aged 21)	
27	Chris Bush	(England)	12 June 1992 (aged 20)	On loan from Gateshead
Midfielders
7	Marley Watkins	(Wales)	17 October 1990 (aged 22)	
11	Simon Clist	(England)	13 June 1981 (aged 31)	
15	Kingsley James	(England)	17 February 1992 (aged 21)	On loan from Port Vale
17	Will Evans	(England)	9 October 1991 (aged 21)	On loan at Newport County
18	Sam Clucas	(England)	25 September 1990 (aged 22)	
20	Craig Jones	(England)	12 December 1989 (aged 23)	
21	Josh O'Keefe	(Republic of Ireland)	22 December 1988 (aged 24)	
22	Brian Smikle	(England)	3 November 1985 (aged 27)	
Forwards
9	Marlon Jackson	(England)	6 December 1990 (aged 22)	
10	Chris Sharp	(Scotland)	19 June 1986 (aged 26)	
19	Ryan Bowman	(England)	30 November 1991 (aged 21)	

Source: Hereford United (Archived)

== Transfers ==
=== Transfers in ===
Date	Pos.	Name	From	Fee	Ref.
20 June 2012	GK	(England) James Bittner	Forest Green Rovers	Free transfer	
20 June 2012	DF	(England) Luke Graham	Forest Green Rovers	Free transfer	
20 July 2012	DF	(England) Chris Carruthers	Gateshead	Free transfer	
20 July 2012	DF	(England) Andy Gallinagh	Bath City	Free transfer	
20 July 2012	FW	(England) Marlon Jackson	Bristol City	Free transfer	
25 July 2012	FW	(England) Ryan Bowman	Darlington	Free transfer	
27 July 2012	MF	(Wales) Marley Watkins	Bath City	Tribunal	
10 August 2012	MF	(England) Ashley Sammons	Birmingham City	Free transfer	
25 August 2012	MF	(England) Brian Smikle	Kidderminster Harriers	Free transfer	
31 August 2012	MF	(England) Tristan Plummer	Portimonense	Free transfer	
13 September 2012	DF	(Wales) Byron Anthony	Bristol Rovers	Free transfer	
25 September 2012	MF	(Republic of Ireland) Josh O'Keefe	Southport	Free transfer	
7 December 2012	MF	(England) Simon Hackney	FC Halifax Town	Free transfer	
1 January 2013	FW	(Scotland) Chris Sharp	AFC Telford United	£3,000	
28 January 2013	DF	(England) Rod McDonald	Nantwich Town	Free transfer	
21 March 2013	MF	(England) Craig Jones	Westfields	Free transfer	

=== Transfers out ===
Date	Pos.	Name	To	Fee	Ref.
8 June 2012	GK	(England) Adam Bartlett	Gateshead	Free transfer	
3 July 2012	MF	(England) Rob Purdie	Shrewsbury Town	Free transfer	
11 July 2012	FW	(France) Yoann Arquin	Notts County	Free transfer	
4 September 2012	DF	(France) Benoît Dalibard	Released		
17 September 2012	MF	(England) Tristan Plummer	Released		
26 September 2012	DF	(Wales) Byron Anthony	Released		
8 October 2012	MF	(England) Ashley Sammons	Released		
1 January 2013	FW	(England) Sean Canham	Released		
9 January 2013	MF	(England) Simon Hackney	Released		
28 January 2013	MF	(England) Harry Pell	AFC Wimbledon	Undisclosed	
22 March 2013	MF	(Northern Ireland) James McQuilkin	Released		

=== Loans in ===
Date	Pos.	Name	From	Until	Ref.
10 August 2012	MF	(England) Tom Nichols	Exeter City	17 September 2012	
5 October 2012	FW	(England) Phil Marsh	Forest Green Rovers	5 January 2013	
8 October 2012	DF	(Wales) Chris Todd	Forest Green Rovers	11 November 2012	
13 October 2012	FW	(England) Kyle Perry	Nuneaton Town	–	
1 January 2013	DF	(England) Andrew Corbett	Burton Albion	–	
4 January 2013	DF	(New Zealand) James Musa	Fulham	–	
28 January 2013	MF	(England) Kingsley James	Port Vale	End of season	
1 March 2013	DF	(England) Joe Connor	Stockport County	–	
28 March 2013	DF	(England) Chris Bush	Gateshead	End of season	

=== Loans out ===
Date	Pos.	Name	To	Ref.
5 October 2012	FW	(England) Sean Canham	Bath City	
31 January 2013	MF	(England) Will Evans	Newport County	

== Pre-season ==
Win Draw Loss

14 July 2012 Friendly	Hereford United	1–1	Yeovil Town	Hereford
15:00 BST				Stadium: Edgar Street; Attendance: 754

21 July 2012 Friendly	Worcester City	0–0	Hereford United	Worcester
15:00 BST				Stadium: St George's Lane; Attendance: 894

24 July 2012 Friendly	Hereford United	4–2	Gloucester City	Hereford
19:45 BST		Report		Stadium: Edgar Street; Attendance: 338

28 July 2012 Friendly	Hereford United	0–0	Everton XI	Hereford
15:00 BST		Report		Stadium: Edgar Street; Attendance: 1,100

31 July 2012 HFA Senior Cup	Westfields	0–2	Hereford United	Hereford
19:00 BST		Report		Stadium: allpay.park Attendance: 592

3 August 2012 Friendly	Hereford United	2–0	Bristol City	Hereford
19:30 BST		Report		Stadium: Edgar Street; Attendance: 365

== Competitions ==
=== Overview ===
Competition	First match	Last match	Starting round	Final position	Record							
Competition	First match	Last match	Starting round	Final position	Pld	W	D	L	GF	GA	GD	Win %
Conference Premier	10 August 2012	20 April 2013	Matchday 1	6th	46	19	13	14	73	63	+10	41.30
FA Cup	20 October 2012	11 December 2012	Fourth qualifying round	Second round (replay)	4	2	1	1	7	4	+3	50.00
FA Trophy	24 November 2012	15 December 2012	First round	Second round	2	1	0	1	1	3	−2	50.00
Total					52	22	14	16	81	70	+11	42.31

Source: FCHD

=== Conference Premier ===
==== League table ====
Pos	Team	Pld	W	D	L	GF	GA	GD	Pts	Promotion, qualification or relegation
4	Grimsby Town	46	23	14	9	70	38	+32	83	Qualification for Conference Premier play-offs
5	Wrexham	46	22	14	10	74	45	+29	80	Qualification for Conference Premier play-offs
6	Hereford United	46	19	13	14	73	63	+10	70	
7	Luton Town	46	18	13	15	70	62	+8	67	
8	Dartford	46	19	9	18	67	63	+4	66	

Updated to match(es) played on 20 April 2013. Source: Football Conference
Rules for classification: 1) points; 2) goal difference; 3) number of goals scored.

==== Results summary ====
Overall								Home						Away					
Pld	W	D	L	GF	GA	GD	Pts	W	D	L	GF	GA	GD	W	D	L	GF	GA	GD
46	19	13	14	73	63	+10	70	9	6	8	37	33	+4	10	7	6	36	30	+6

Last updated: 20 April 2013.
Source: Football Web Pages

==== Results by round ====
Round	1	2	3	4	5	6	7	8	9	10	11	12	13	14	15	16	17	18	19	20	21	22	23	24	25	26	27	28	29	30	31	32	33	34	35	36	37	38	39	40	41	42	43	44	45	46
Ground	H	A	A	H	A	H	H	A	A	H	H	A	H	A	H	A	H	A	A	A	H	A	A	H	H	H	A	H	H	A	A	A	H	H	A	H	A	H	H	A	H	A	A	H	H	A
Result	W	D	W	W	L	L	W	L	L	W	L	D	L	D	D	D	W	W	L	W	L	W	D	D	D	D	W	L	W	L	W	W	D	L	D	W	L	L	W	D	W	W	W	D	L	W
Position	1	6	2	2	4	9	6	8	12	10	11	10	12	12	14	14	12	9	10	9	14	12	10	11	11	12	12	13	11	11	9	7	7	8	9	8	9	10	8	8	7	7	6	6	6	6
Points	3	4	7	10	10	10	13	13	13	16	16	17	17	18	19	20	23	26	26	29	29	32	33	34	35	36	39	39	42	42	45	48	49	49	50	53	53	53	56	57	60	63	66	67	67	70

Updated to match(es) played on 20 April 2013. Source: Football Web Pages
A = Away; H = Home; W = Win; D = Draw; L = Loss

==== Matches ====
The league fixtures were announced on 2 July 2012, with the season starting on 10 August.

Win Draw Loss

10 August 2012 1	Hereford United	2–1	Macclesfield Town	Hereford
19:30 BST				Stadium: Edgar Street; Attendance: 2,139; Referee: K. Johnson

14 August 2012 2	Tamworth	2–2	Hereford United	Tamworth
19:45 BST				Stadium: The Lamb Ground; Attendance: 1,265; Referee: R. Martin

18 August 2012 3	Alfreton Town	0–3	Hereford United	Alfreton
15:00 BST				Stadium: North Street; Attendance: 690; Referee: S. Stockbridge

25 August 2012 4	Hereford United	4–2	Ebbsfleet United	Hereford
15:00 BST				Stadium: Edgar Street; Attendance: 1,906; Referee: B. Huxtable

28 August 2012 5	Newport County	2–0	Hereford United	Newport
19:45 BST				Stadium: Rodney Parade; Attendance: 4,365; Referee: G. Horwood

1 September 2012 6	Hereford United	0–2	Grimsby Town	Hereford
15:00 BST				Stadium: Edgar Street; Attendance: 2,059; Referee: C. Breakspear

4 September 2012 7	Hereford United	2–1	Woking	Hereford
19:45 BST				Stadium: Edgar Street; Attendance: 1,481; Referee: K. Evans

8 September 2012 8	Hyde	5–2	Hereford United	Hyde
15:00 BST				Stadium: Ewen Fields; Attendance: 688; Referee: W. Barratt

15 September 2012 9	Dartford	4–0	Hereford United	Dartford
15:00 BST				Stadium: Princes Park; Attendance: 1,601; Referee: D. Treleaven

22 September 2012 10	Hereford United	4–2	Cambridge United	Hereford
15:00 BST				Stadium: Edgar Street; Attendance: 1,677; Referee: D. Ford

25 September 2012 11	Hereford United	1–2	Forest Green Rovers	Hereford
19:45 BST				Stadium: Edgar Street; Attendance: 1,656; Referee: M. Bull

29 September 2012 12	Mansfield Town	1–1	Hereford United	Mansfield
15:00 BST				Stadium: Field Mill; Attendance: 2,248; Referee: D. Handley

6 October 2012 13	Hereford United	1–2	Stockport County	Hereford
15:00 BST				Stadium: Edgar Street; Attendance: 1,889; Referee: G. Horwood

9 October 2012 14	Nuneaton Town	0–0	Hereford United	Nuneaton
19:45 BST				Stadium: Liberty Way; Attendance: 969

13 October 2012 15	Hereford United	0–0	Braintree Town	Hereford
15:00 BST				Stadium: Edgar Street; Attendance: 1,537

27 October 2012 16	Southport	2–2	Hereford United	Southport
15:00 BST				Stadium: Haig Avenue; Attendance: 1,028; Referee: K. Evans

6 November 2012 17	Hereford United	1–0	Luton Town	Hereford
19:45 GMT				Stadium: Edgar Street; Attendance: 2,108; Referee: P. Bankes

10 November 2012 18	Wrexham	1–2	Hereford United	Wrexham
13:00 GMT				Stadium: Racecourse Ground; Attendance: 3,620; Referee: D. Handley

17 November 2012 19	Lincoln City	3–2	Hereford United	Lincoln
15:00 GMT				Stadium: Sincil Bank; Attendance: 2,233; Referee: M. Bull

7 December 2012 20	Barrow	0–2	Hereford United	Barrow-in-Furness
19:45 GMT				Stadium: Holker Street; Attendance: 867; Referee: S. Stockbridge

26 December 2012 21	Hereford United	0–1	Kidderminster Harriers	Hereford
15:00 GMT				Stadium: Edgar Street; Attendance: 2,902; Referee: B. Huxtable

1 January 2013 22	Kidderminster Harriers	0–1	Hereford United	Kidderminster
15:00 GMT				Stadium: Aggborough Stadium; Attendance: 3,674; Referee: G. Turner

5 January 2013 23	Grimsby Town	1–1	Hereford United	Cleethorpes
15:00 GMT				Stadium: Blundell Park; Attendance: 3,793; Referee: W. Barratt

8 January 2013 24	Hereford United	1–1	AFC Telford United	Hereford
19:45 GMT				Stadium: Edgar Street; Attendance: 1,490; Referee: P. Banks

12 January 2013 25	Hereford United	3–3	Alfreton Town	Hereford
15:00 GMT				Stadium: Edgar Street; Attendance: 1,565; Referee: J. Amey

2 February 2013 26	Hereford United	2–2	Southport	Hereford
15:00 GMT				Stadium: Edgar Street; Attendance: 1,513; Referee: B. Huxtable

9 February 2013 27	Braintree Town	0–2	Hereford United	Braintree
15:00 GMT				Stadium: Cressing Road; Attendance: 658; Referee: D. Ford

12 February 2013 28	Hereford United	0–1	Wrexham	Hereford
19:45 GMT				Stadium: Edgar Street; Attendance: 1,781; Referee: R. Martin

16 February 2013 29	Hereford United	3–2	Lincoln City	Hereford
15:00 GMT				Stadium: Edgar Street; Attendance: 1,914; Referee: P. Rees

19 February 2013 30	Ebbsfleet United	1–0	Hereford United	Northfleet
19:45 GMT				Stadium: Stonebridge Road; Attendance: 614; Referee: D. Treleaven

23 February 2013 31	Cambridge United	1–3	Hereford United	Cambridge
15:00 GMT				Stadium: Abbey Stadium; Attendance: 2,171; Referee: J. Hopkins

26 February 2013 32	Stockport County	2–3	Hereford United	Stockport
19:45 GMT				Stadium: Edgeley Park; Attendance: 2,618; Referee: K. Evans

2 March 2013 33	Hereford United	0–0	Nuneaton Town	Hereford
15:00 GMT				Stadium: Edgar Street; Attendance: 1,908; Referee: L. Swabey

5 March 2013 34	Hereford United	2–3	Newport County	Hereford
19:45 GMT				Stadium: Edgar Street; Attendance: 2,519; Referee: R. Whitton

9 March 2013 35	Luton Town	1–1	Hereford United	Luton
15:00 GMT				Stadium: Kenilworth Road; Attendance: 6,001; Referee: J. Amey

16 March 2013 36	Hereford United	2–1	Barrow	Hereford
15:00 GMT				Stadium: Edgar Street; Attendance: 1,273; Referee: P. Rees

19 March 2013 37	Gateshead	3–2	Hereford United	Gateshead
19:45 GMT				Stadium: Gateshead International Stadium; Attendance: 259; Referee: J. Whiteley

23 March 2013 38	Hereford United	1–2	Hyde	Hereford
15:00 GMT				Stadium: Edgar Street; Attendance: 1,152; Referee: D. Treleaven

26 March 2013 39	Hereford United	1–0	Dartford	Hereford
19:45 GMT				Stadium: Edgar Street; Attendance: 662; Referee: A. Bromley

30 March 2013 40	Woking	1–1	Hereford United	Woking
15:00 GMT				Stadium: Kingfield Stadium; Attendance: 2,303; Referee: D. Ford

1 April 2013 41	Hereford United	5–2	Tamworth	Hereford
15:00 BST				Stadium: Edgar Street; Attendance: 1,424; Referee: C. Breakspear

6 April 2013 42	Macclesfield Town	0–1	Hereford United	Macclesfield
15:00 BST				Stadium: Moss Rose; Attendance: 1,687; Referee: C. Kavanagh

9 April 2013 43	Forest Green Rovers	0–1	Hereford United	Nailsworth
19:45 BST				Stadium: The New Lawn; Attendance: 1,142; Referee: G. Horwood

13 April 2013 44	Hereford United	1–1	Gateshead	Hereford
15:00 BST				Stadium: Edgar Street; Attendance: 1,599; Referee: R. Martin

16 April 2013 45	Hereford United	1–2	Mansfield Town	Hereford
19:45 BST				Stadium: Edgar Street; Attendance: 2,141; Referee: L. Swabey

20 April 2013 46	AFC Telford United	0–4	Hereford United	Wellington
17:15 BST				Stadium: New Bucks Head; Attendance: 2,102; Referee: J. Hopkins

Source: Football Web Pages

=== FA Cup ===
Hereford entered the competition in the fourth qualifying round.

Win Draw Loss

20 October 2012 4Q	FC United of Manchester	0–2	Hereford United	Bury
15:00 BST		Report	Bowman 38', 81'	Stadium: Gigg Lane; Attendance: 2,212; Referee: Ross Joyce

3 November 2012 1R	Hereford United	3–1	Shrewsbury Town	Hereford
13:00 GMT	Evans 3'; Bowman 12', 73' (pen.)	Report	Summerfield 30'	Stadium: Edgar Street; Attendance: 3,251; Referee: Gary Sutton

3 December 2012 2R	Cheltenham Town	1–1	Hereford United	Cheltenham
19:45 GMT	Harrad 16'	Report	O'Keefe 20'	Stadium: Whaddon Road; Attendance: 5,070; Referee: Craig Pawson

11 December 2012 Replay	Hereford United	1–2 (a.e.t.)	Cheltenham Town	Hereford
19:45 GMT	Clucas 74'	Report	Harrad 45+3' (pen.); Mohamed 114'	Stadium: Edgar Street; Attendance: 5,026; Referee: Dean Whitestone

Source: Football Web Pages

=== FA Trophy ===
Hereford entered the competition in the first round.

Win Draw Loss

24 November 2012 1R	Ebbsfleet United	0–1	Hereford United	Northfleet
15:00 GMT		Report	O'Keefe 71'	Stadium: Stonebridge Road; Attendance: 651; Referee: John Hopkins

15 December 2012 2R	Hereford United	0–3	Chelmsford City	Hereford
15:00 GMT		Report	Edmans 20', 27'; Rainford 42'	Stadium: Edgar Street; Attendance: 1,124; Referee: Lee Swabey

Source: FCHD

== Attendances ==
Date	Time	Opponent	Result	Competition	Attendance
10 August 2012	19:30	Macclesfield Town	2–1	Conference Premier	2,139
25 August 2012	15:00	Ebbsfleet United	4–2	Conference Premier	1,906 ▼
1 September 2012	15:00	Grimsby Town	0–2	Conference Premier	2,059 ▲
4 September 2012	19:45	Woking	2–1	Conference Premier	1,481 ▼
22 September 2012	15:00	Cambridge United	4–2	Conference Premier	1,677 ▲
25 September 2012	19:45	Forest Green Rovers	1–2	Conference Premier	1,656 ▼
6 October 2012	15:00	Stockport County	1–2	Conference Premier	1,889 ▲
13 October 2012	15:00	Braintree Town	0–0	Conference Premier	1,537 ▼
3 November 2012	13:00	Shrewsbury Town	3–1	FA Cup	3,251 ▲
6 November 2012	19:45	Luton Town	1–0	Conference Premier	2,108 ▼
11 December 2012	19:45	Cheltenham Town	1–2	FA Cup	5,026 ▲
15 December 2012	15:00	Chelmsford City	0–3	FA Trophy	1,124 ▼
26 December 2012	15:00	Kidderminster Harriers	0–1	Conference Premier	2,902 ▲
8 January 2013	19:45	AFC Telford United	1–1	Conference Premier	1,490 ▼
12 January 2013	15:00	Alfreton Town	3–3	Conference Premier	1,565 ▲
2 February 2013	15:00	Southport	2–2	Conference Premier	1,513 ▼
12 February 2013	19:45	Wrexham	0–1	Conference Premier	1,781 ▲
16 February 2013	15:00	Lincoln City	3–2	Conference Premier	1,914 ▲
2 March 2013	15:00	Nuneaton Town	0–0	Conference Premier	1,908 ▼
5 March 2013	19:45	Newport County	2–3	Conference Premier	2,519 ▲
16 March 2013	15:00	Barrow	2–1	Conference Premier	1,273 ▼
23 March 2013	15:00	Hyde	1–2	Conference Premier	1,152 ▼
26 March 2013	19:45	Dartford	1–0	Conference Premier	662 ▼
1 April 2013	15:00	Tamworth	5–2	Conference Premier	1,424 ▲
13 April 2013	15:00	Gateshead	1–1	Conference Premier	1,599 ▲
16 April 2013	19:45	Mansfield Town	1–2	Conference Premier	2,141 ▲

Source: Football Web Pages

== Squad statistics ==
As of match played 20 April 2013

=== Appearance and goals ===
- The plus (+) symbol denotes an appearance as a substitute, hence 2+1 indicates two appearances in the starting XI and one appearance as a substitute.
- Italics indicate player is/was a loan player

No.	Pos	Nat	Player	Total		Conference Premier		FA Cup		FA Trophy	
No.	Pos	Nat	Player	Apps	Goals	Apps	Goals	Apps	Goals	Apps	Goals
1	GK	(England) ENG	James Bittner	39	0	34	0	4	0	1	0
2	DF	(England) ENG	Andy Gallinagh	32	0	26+1	0	4	0	1	0
3	DF	(England) ENG	Joe Heath	25	0	12+8	0	4	0	1	0
4	DF	(England) ENG	Joe Connor	13	0	11+2	0	0	0	0	0
5	DF	(England) ENG	Michael Townsend	8	0	7	0	0	0	1	0
6	DF	(England) ENG	Luke Graham	48	2	42+1	2	2+1	0	2	0
7	MF	(Wales) WAL	Marley Watkins	36	5	34	5	0+1	0	0+1	0
8	DF	(England) ENG	Chris Carruthers	21	1	18+3	1	0	0	0	0
9	FW	(England) ENG	Marlon Jackson	25	7	12+13	7	0	0	0	0
10	FW	(Scotland) SCO	Chris Sharp	25	4	25	4	0	0	0	0
11	MF	(England) ENG	Simon Clist	19	0	12+4	0	0+2	0	1	0
12	GK	(Wales) WAL	Dan Hanford	13	0	12	0	0	0	1	0
14	DF	(Netherlands) NED	Stefan Stam	43	3	35+2	3	4	0	2	0
15	MF	(England) ENG	Kingsley James	21	1	21	1	0	0	0	0
18	MF	(England) ENG	Sam Clucas	47	9	41	8	4	1	2	0
19	FW	(England) ENG	Ryan Bowman	43	19	30+9	15	4	4	0	0
20	MF	(England) ENG	Craig Jones	1	0	0+1	0	0	0	0	0
21	MF	(Republic of Ireland) IRL	Josh O'Keefe	38	14	30+3	12	3	1	1+1	1
22	MF	(England) ENG	Brian Smikle	30	1	6+18	1	2+2	0	1+1	0
26	DF	(England) ENG	Rod McDonald	11	2	5+6	2	0	0	0	0
27	DF	(England) ENG	Chris Bush	6	0	6	0	0	0	0	0
Youth team players
39	MF	(Wales) WAL	Lewis Feeley	0	0	0	0	0	0	0	0
Players out on loan
17	MF	(England) ENG	Will Evans	21	2	10+6	1	4	1	1	0
Players who left during the season but made an appearance
4	MF	(England) ENG	Harry Pell	29	1	22+1	1	4	0	2	0
10	FW	(England) ENG	Sean Canham	10	3	8+2	3	0	0	0	0
15	DF	(France) FRA	Benoît Dalibard	0	0	0	0	0	0	0	0
15	DF	(Wales) WAL	Byron Anthony	2	0	2	0	0	0	0	0
15	FW	(England) ENG	Phil Marsh	12	1	4+3	1	1+2	0	2	0
16	MF	(Northern Ireland) NIR	James McQuilkin	13	1	4+5	1	2	0	1+1	0
20	MF	(England) ENG	Ashley Sammons	9	1	5+4	1	0	0	0	0
20	MF	(England) ENG	Simon Hackney	2	0	1	0	0	0	1	0
21	MF	(England) ENG	Tom Nichols	9	1	4+5	1	0	0	0	0
23	DF	(Wales) WAL	Chris Todd	7	1	5	1	2	0	0	0
23	MF	(England) ENG	Tristan Plummer	3	0	0+3	0	0	0	0	0
26	FW	(England) ENG	Kyle Perry	12	0	2+6	0	0+2	0	1+1	0
27	DF	(New Zealand) NZL	James Musa	15	0	15	0	0	0	0	0
28	DF	(England) ENG	Andrew Corbett	5	0	5	0	0	0	0	0

Source: Soccerbase

Players with zero appearances were unused substitutes named in at least one matchday squad.

=== Goals ===
Rank	No.	Pos.	Player	Conference Premier	FA Cup	FA Trophy	Total
1	19	FW	(England) Ryan Bowman	15	4	0	19
2	21	MF	(Republic of Ireland) Josh O'Keefe	12	1	1	14
3	18	MF	(England) Sam Clucas	8	1	0	9
4	9	FW	(England) Marlon Jackson	7	0	0	7
5	7	MF	(Wales) Marley Watkins	5	0	0	5
6	10	FW	(Scotland) Chris Sharp	4	0	0	4
7	10	FW	(England) Sean Canham (Note: Canham left the club on 1 January 2013)	3	0	0	3
7	14	DF	(Netherlands) Stefan Stam	3	0	0	3
9	6	DF	(England) Luke Graham	2	0	0	2
9	17	MF	(England) Will Evans (Note: Evans left the club on loan on 31 January 2013)	1	1	0	2
9	26	DF	(England) Rod McDonald	2	0	0	2
12	4	MF	(England) Harry Pell (Note: Pell left the club on 28 January 2013)	1	0	0	1
12	8	DF	(England) Chris Carruthers	1	0	0	1
12	15	MF	(England) Kingsley James	1	0	0	1
12	15	FW	(England) Phil Marsh (Note: Marsh returned to his parent club on 5 January 2013)	1	0	0	1
12	16	MF	(Northern Ireland) James McQuilkin (Note: McQuilkin left the club on 22 March 2013)	1	0	0	1
12	20	MF	(England) Ashley Sammons (Note: Sammons left the club on 8 October 2012)	1	0	0	1
12	21	MF	(England) Tom Nichols (Note: Nichols returned to his parent club on 17 September 2012)	1	0	0	1
12	22	MF	(England) Brian Smikle	1	0	0	1
12	23	DF	(Wales) Chris Todd (Note: Todd returned to his parent club on 11 November 2012)	1	0	0	1
Own goals				2	0	0	2
Total				73	7	1	81
