= 2013–14 Hereford United F.C. season =

Hereford United F.C.
2013–14 season
- Chairman: David Keyte
- Manager: Martin Foyle (until 19 March); Peter Beadle (caretaker, from 20 March)
- Conference Premier: 20th (demoted)
- FA Cup: First round
- FA Trophy: First round
- Highest home attendance: 2,545 v Grimsby Town, Conference Premier, 29 March 2014
- Lowest home attendance: 1,013 v Macclesfield Town, Conference Premier, 25 February 2014
- Average home league attendance: 1,758
- Biggest win: 3–0 v Southport (A), Conference Premier, 16 November 2013; 4–1 v Southport (H), Conference Premier, 18 January 2014
- Biggest defeat: 0–7 v Luton Town (A), Conference Premier, 15 February 2014
Home colours	Away colours

The 2013–14 season was the 93rd and penultimate competitive season of Hereford United Football Club and their second consecutive season, as well as their 11th overall, in the Conference Premier, the fifth tier of English football, following their 6th-placed finish in the previous season. The club also completed in both the FA Cup and the FA Trophy.

== Season summary ==
During the summer of 2013, Hereford lost three of their key players from the previous season, including top goalscorer Ryan Bowman. Bowman, along with Marley Watkins and Sam Clucas, were offered contracts but all three signed elsewhere, meaning Hereford were to be awarded a fee for each player at tribunal at a later date.

On 10 January 2014, Hereford were placed under a transfer embargo.

Manager Martin Foyle and his assistant Andy Porter left the club on 19 March 2014, with youth team manager Peter Beadle taking over as caretaker the following day.

Hereford entered the final day of the season in the relegation zone and needed to win at Aldershot Town combined with Chester failing to win at home to Salisbury City in order to stay up. Going into the 86th minute, Chester were winning 2–1 whilst Hereford were drawing 1–1 and looking certain to be relegated. Chester then conceded an equaliser before Michael Rankine scored an 88th-minute winner for Hereford to completely change the outcome in the space of two minutes, and ensuring Hereford avoided relegation.

This season Hereford gave future West Ham and England forward Jarrod Bowen his first appearances in professional football.

On 10 June 2014, the club was expelled from the Football Conference despite their final day survival, meaning they would be demoted to the Southern League Premier Division and Chester reprieved from relegation. The club commenced their campaign in the Southern League the following season, but would go on to be wound-up in court on 19 December 2014.

== First-team squad ==
As of 26 April 2014

No.	Name	Nat.	Date of birth (age)	Signed from	Apps	Goals
Goalkeepers
1	Rhys Evans	(England)	27 January 1982 (aged 32)	Exeter City	0	0
21	Daniel Lloyd-Weston	(England)	17 August 1991 (aged 22)	Market Drayton Town	0	0
Defenders						
2	Daniel Leadbitter	(England)	24 June 1991 (aged 22)	Torquay United	0	0
3	Chris Bush	(England)	12 June 1992 (aged 21)	Gateshead	6	0
5	Rod McDonald	(England)	11 April 1992 (aged 22)	Nantwich Town	11	2
6	Luke Graham	(Wales)	27 April 1986 (aged 27)	Forest Green Rovers	48	2
12	Dominic Collins	(England)	15 April 1991 (aged 23)	Chester	0	0
14	Joel Edwards	(England)	18 August 1991 (aged 22)	Westfields	0	0
Midfielders
4	Kingsley James	(England)	17 February 1992 (aged 22)	Port Vale	21	1
7	Rob Purdie (captain)	(England)	28 September 1982 (aged 31)	Shrewsbury Town	204	26
16	Frankie Artus	(England)	27 September 1988 (aged 25)	Grimsby Town	0	0
18	Danny Pilkington	(England)	25 May 1990 (aged 23)	Kidderminster Harriers	0	0
19	Sam Gwynne	(England)	17 December 1987 (aged 26)	Brackley Town	81	1
22	Jamie Edge	(England)	9 September 1993 (aged 20)	Cirencester Town	0	0
33	Billy Murphy	(Republic of Ireland)	22 December 1995 (aged 18)	Youth team	0	0
Forwards
9	Dan Walker	(England)	4 October 1990 (aged 23)	Luton Town	0	0
10	Chris Sharp	(Scotland)	19 June 1986 (aged 27)	AFC Telford United	25	4
11	Sam Smith	(England)	20 May 1990 (aged 23)	Cambridge United	0	0
15	Michael Rankine	(England)	15 January 1985 (aged 29)	Aldershot Town	0	0
17	Jonathan Brown	(Wales)	27 April 1990 (aged 23)	(Thailand) Suphanburi	0	0
30	Cory Williams	(Wales)	26 September 1995 (aged 18)	Youth team	0	0
32	Jarrod Bowen	(England)	20 December 1996 (aged 17)	Youth team	0	0

== Transfers ==
=== Transfers in ===
Date	Pos.	Name	From	Fee	Ref.
5 June 2013	FW	(England) Dan Walker	Luton Town	Free transfer	
19 June 2013	DF	(England) Chris Bush	Gateshead	Free transfer	
19 June 2013	MF	(England) Danny Pilkington	Kidderminster Harriers	Free transfer	
26 June 2013	GK	(England) Daniel Lloyd-Weston	Market Drayton Town	Free transfer	
20 June 2013	DF	(England) Dominic Collins	Chester	Free transfer	
3 July 2013	MF	(England) Rob Purdie	Shrewsbury Town	Free transfer	
26 July 2013	FW	(Wales) Jonathan Brown	(Thailand) Suphanburi	Free transfer	
26 July 2013	DF	(England) Joel Edwards	Westfields	Free transfer	
30 July 2013	FW	(England) Michael Rankine	Aldershot Town	Free transfer	
31 July 2013	MF	(England) Frankie Artus	Grimsby Town	Free transfer	
31 July 2013	MF	(England) Sam Gwynne	Brackley Town	Free transfer	
1 August 2013	GK	(England) Rhys Evans	Exeter City	Free transfer	
1 August 2013	MF	(England) Kingsley James	Port Vale	Free transfer	
1 August 2013	DF	(England) Daniel Leadbitter	Torquay United	Free transfer	
19 September 2013	FW	(England) Eric Odhiambo	(Turkey) Denizlispor	Free transfer	
18 December 2013	MF	(England) Jamie Edge	Cirencester Town	Free transfer	

=== Transfers out ===
Date	Pos.	Name	To	Fee	Ref.
22 April 2013	MF	(England) Simon Clist	Released		
22 April 2013	DF	(England) Andy Gallinagh	Released		
22 April 2013	GK	(Wales) Dan Hanford	Released		
22 April 2013	MF	(England) Brian Smikle	Released		
22 April 2013	DF	(England) Michael Townsend	Released		
17 May 2013	DF	(Netherlands) Stefan Stam	(Netherlands) FC Den Bosch	Free transfer	
24 May 2013	FW	(England) Ryan Bowman	York City	£20,000 (Note: Fee was set at tribunal and includes a 15% sell on-clause)	
10 June 2013	MF	(Wales) Marley Watkins	(Scotland) Inverness Caledonian Thistle	Tribunal (Note: Fee was set at tribunal and includes a 15% sell on-clause)	
21 June 2013	MF	(England) Sam Clucas	Mansfield Town	£20,000 (Note: Fee was set at tribunal and includes a 15% sell on-clause)	
26 June 2013	GK	(England) James Bittner	Released		
30 June 2013	DF	(England) Chris Carruthers	Corby Town	Free transfer	
30 June 2013	MF	(England) Will Evans	Eastleigh	Free transfer	
30 June 2013	MF	(England) Craig Jones	Released		
6 July 2013	DF	(England) Joe Heath	Chester	Free transfer	
31 July 2013	FW	(England) Marlon Jackson	Bury	Free transfer	
17 September 2013	FW	(England) Jake Harris	Released		
7 January 2014	FW	(England) Eric Odhiambo	Released		
31 January 2014	MF	(Republic of Ireland) Josh O'Keefe	Kidderminster Harriers	Undisclosed	

=== Loans in ===
Date	Pos.	Name	From	Until	Ref.
12 June 2013	FW	(England) Sam Smith	Cambridge United	End of season	
26 August 2013	MF	(England) Michael West	Crewe Alexandra	26 September 2013	
29 August 2013	MF	(England) Paul Green	Forest Green Rovers	29 September 2013	
13 September 2013	FW	(England) Richard Brodie	Gateshead	16 October 2013	
11 October 2013	MF	(France) Kevin Krans	Bristol City	11 November 2013	
11 October 2013	FW	(England) Ross Dyer	Mansfield Town	21 November 2013	
12 November 2013	MF	(England) Damon Lathrope	Torquay United	3 January 2014	
26 November 2013	MF	(England) Micah Evans	Burnley	26 December 2013	

=== Loans out ===
Date	Pos.	Name	To	Until	Ref.
12 November 2013	FW	(Scotland) Chris Sharp	Lincoln City	12 December 2013	

== Pre-season ==
Win Draw Loss

13 July 2013 Friendly	Leominster Town XI	0–5	Hereford United	Leominster
13:00 BST				Stadium: Bridge Street Sports Centre

16 July 2013 Friendly	Hereford United	0–1	Bristol Rovers	Hereford
19:30 BST			Clarkson 74'	Stadium: Edgar Street

20 July 2013 Friendly	Hereford United	1–2	West Bromwich Albion XI	Hereford
13:00 BST	O'Keefe 28'		Jones 38'; Atkinson 65'	Stadium: Edgar Street; Attendance: 667

27 July 2013 Friendly	Hereford United	0–1	Torquay United	Hereford
13:00 BST		Report	Downes 72'	Stadium: Edgar Street; Attendance: 556

30 July 2013 Herefordshire Senior Cup	Westfields	1–1 (6–5 p)	Hereford United	Hereford
19:30 BST		Report		Stadium: allpay.park Attendance: 515

3 August 2013 Friendly	Hereford United	0–2	Cardiff City XI	Hereford
15:00 BST		Report	Harris 27'; Maynard 32'	Stadium: Edgar Street; Attendance: 771

== Competitions ==
=== Overview ===
Competition	First match	Last match	Starting round	Final position	Record							
Competition	First match	Last match	Starting round	Final position	Pld	W	D	L	GF	GA	GD	Win %
Conference Premier	10 August 2013	26 April 2014	Matchday 1	20th	46	13	12	21	44	63	−19	28.26
FA Cup	26 October 2013	10 November 2013	Fourth qualifying round	First round	2	1	0	1	1	2	−1	50.00
FA Trophy	30 November 2013		First round	First round	1	0	0	1	0	3	−3	0.00
Total					49	14	12	23	45	68	−23	28.57

Source: FCHD

=== Conference Premier ===
==== League table ====
Pos	Team	Pld	W	D	L	GF	GA	GD	Pts	Promotion, qualification or relegation
18	Southport	46	14	11	21	53	71	−18	53	
19	Aldershot Town (Note: Aldershot Town deducted ten points for entering administration)	46	16	13	17	69	62	+7	51	
20	Hereford United (R)	46	13	12	21	44	63	−19	51 (Note: On 10 June 2014, Hereford United were expelled from the Conference due to financial irregularities. They were later accepted into the Southern League. Because of this, Chester were reprieved from relegation.)	Demoted to the Southern League Premier Division
21	Chester	46	12	15	19	49	70	−21	51	
22	Dartford	46	12	8	26	49	74	−25	44 (Note: On 13 June 2014, Salisbury City were demoted to the Conference South due to financial irregularities. Because of this, Dartford were reprieved from relegation. Salisbury were subsequently expelled from the Football Conference altogether on 4 July 2014, after which they went into liquidation.)	

Updated to match(es) played on 26 April 2014. Source: Football Conference
Rules for classification: 1) points; 2) goal difference; 3) number of goals scored.
(R) Relegated

==== Results summary ====
Overall								Home						Away					
Pld	W	D	L	GF	GA	GD	Pts	W	D	L	GF	GA	GD	W	D	L	GF	GA	GD
46	13	12	21	44	63	−19	51	9	6	8	24	24	0	4	6	13	20	39	−19

Last updated: 26 April 2014.
Source: Football Web Pages

==== Results by round ====
Round	1	2	3	4	5	6	7	8	9	10	11	12	13	14	15	16	17	18	19	20	21	22	23	24	25	26	27	28	29	30	31	32	33	34	35	36	37	38	39	40	41	42	43	44	45	46
Ground	H	A	A	H	A	H	A	H	A	A	H	H	A	A	H	H	A	H	A	A	H	H	H	A	H	A	H	H	H	A	A	A	H	H	A	A	H	A	A	H	H	A	H	A	H	A
Result	D	W	D	W	L	W	L	L	L	D	W	D	L	L	D	L	L	D	W	D	W	L	W	L	W	D	W	W	D	L	L	L	L	L	D	D	D	L	L	L	L	W	L	L	W	W
Position	10	5	9	5	12	7	10	13	17	16	16	15	16	17	17	20	20	20	18	18	18	18	18	18	17	17	17	17	16	16	18	19	19	19	19	19	19	19	20	21	21	21	21	21	21	20
Points	1	4	5	8	8	11	11	11	11	12	15	16	16	16	17	17	17	18	21	22	25	25	28	28	31	32	35	38	39	39	39	39	39	39	40	41	42	42	42	42	42	45	45	45	48	51

Updated to match(es) played on 26 April 2014. Source: Football Web Pages
A = Away; H = Home; W = Win; D = Draw; L = Loss

==== Matches ====
The league fixtures were announced on 3 July 2013, with the season starting on 10 August.

Win Draw Loss

10 August 2013 1	Hereford United	1–1	Braintree Town	Hereford
15:00 BST				Stadium: Edgar Street; Attendance: 2,033

13 August 2013 2	Chester	0–2	Hereford United	Chester
19:45 BST				Stadium: Deva Stadium; Attendance: 2,900

17 August 2013 3	Hyde	2–2	Hereford United	Hyde
15:00 BST				Stadium: Ewen Fields; Attendance: 509

24 August 2013 4	Hereford United	1–0	Tamworth	Hereford
15:00 BST				Stadium: Edgar Street; Attendance: 1,864

26 August 2013 5	Alfreton Town	2–1	Hereford United	Alfreton
15:00 BST				Stadium: North Street; Attendance: 740

31 August 2013 6	Hereford United	2–1	Welling United	Hereford
15:00 BST				Stadium: Edgar Street; Attendance: 1,527

7 September 2013 7	Gateshead	2–1	Hereford United	Gateshead
15:00 BST				Stadium: Gateshead International Stadium; Attendance: 931

13 September 2013 8	Hereford United	0–2	Aldershot Town	Hereford
19:45 BST				Stadium: Edgar Street; Attendance: 1,851

17 September 2013 9	Nuneaton Town	2–1	Hereford United	Nuneaton
19:45 BST				Stadium: Liberty Way; Attendance: 1,085

21 September 2013 10	FC Halifax Town	1–1	Hereford United	Halifax
15:00 BST				Stadium: The Shay; Attendance: 1,362

24 September 2013 11	Hereford United	1–0	Lincoln City	Hereford
19:45 BST				Stadium: Edgar Street; Attendance: 1,398

28 September 2013 12	Hereford United	0–0	Luton Town	Hereford
15:00 BST				Stadium: Edgar Street; Attendance: 2,386

5 October 2013 13	Cambridge United	1–0	Hereford United	Cambridge
15:00 BST				Stadium: Abbey Stadium; Attendance: 3,381

8 October 2013 14	Macclesfield Town	1–0	Hereford United	Macclesfield
19:45 BST				Stadium: Moss Rose; Attendance: 1,329

12 October 2013 15	Hereford United	2–2	Dartford	Hereford
15:00 BST				Stadium: Edgar Street; Attendance: 1,583

19 October 2013 16	Hereford United	0–1	Barnet	Hereford
15:00 BST				Stadium: Edgar Street; Attendance: 1,632

31 October 2013 17	Salisbury City	4–1	Hereford United	Salisbury
19:45 GMT				Stadium: The Raymond McEnhill Stadium; Attendance: x

12 November 2013 18	Hereford United	2–2	Chester	Hereford
19:45 GMT				Stadium: Edgar Street; Attendance: 1,512

16 November 2013 19	Southport	0–3	Hereford United	Southport
15:00 GMT				Stadium: Haig Avenue; Attendance: 876

23 November 2013 20	Lincoln City	1–1	Hereford United	Lincoln
15:00 GMT				Stadium: Sincil Bank; Attendance: 1,874

26 November 2013 21	Hereford United	3–2	FC Halifax Town	Hereford
19:45 GMT				Stadium: Edgar Street; Attendance: 1,158

7 December 2013 22	Hereford United	0–1	Nuneaton Town	Hereford
15:00 GMT				Stadium: Edgar Street; Attendance: 1,292

21 December 2013 23	Hereford United	1–0	Cambridge United	Hereford
15:00 GMT				Stadium: Edgar Street; Attendance: 1,558

26 December 2013 24	Kidderminster Harriers	2–1	Hereford United	Kidderminster
15:00 GMT				Stadium: Aggborough Stadium; Attendance: 3,420

28 December 2013 25	Hereford United	1–0	Forest Green Rovers	Hereford
19:30 GMT				Stadium: Edgar Street; Attendance: 1,848

9 January 2014 26	Forest Green Rovers	1–1	Hereford United	Nailsworth
19:30 GMT				Stadium: The New Lawn; Attendance: 1,077

18 January 2014 27	Hereford United	4–1	Southport	Hereford
15:00 GMT				Stadium: Edgar Street; Attendance: 1,569

25 January 2014 28	Hereford United	1–0	Salisbury City	Hereford
15:00 GMT				Stadium: Edgar Street; Attendance: 2,016

28 January 2014 29	Hereford United	1–1	Kidderminster Harriers	Hereford
19:45 GMT				Stadium: Edgar Street; Attendance: 2,014

3 February 2014 30	Woking	3–0	Hereford United	Woking
15:00 GMT				Stadium: Kingfield Stadium; Attendance: 1,131

15 February 2014 31	Luton Town	7–0	Hereford United	Luton
15:00 GMT				Stadium: Kenilworth Road; Attendance: 7,111

22 February 2014 32	Dartford	2–0	Hereford United	Dartford
15:00 GMT				Stadium: Princes Park; Attendance: 1,137

25 February 2014 33	Hereford United	1–2	Macclesfield Town	Hereford
19:45 GMT				Stadium: Edgar Street; Attendance: 1,013

1 March 2014 34	Hereford United	0–2	Wrexham	Hereford
15:00 GMT				Stadium: Edgar Street; Attendance: 1,884

8 March 2014 35	Braintree Town	1–1	Hereford United	Braintree
15:00 GMT				Stadium: Cressing Road; Attendance: 805

11 March 2014 36	Grimsby Town	1–1	Hereford United	Cleethorpes
19:45 GMT				Stadium: Blundell Park; Attendance: 3,007

15 March 2014 37	Hereford United	0–0	Hyde	Hereford
15:00 GMT				Stadium: Edgar Street; Attendance: 1,378

18 March 2014 38	Wrexham	2–0	Hereford United	Wrexham
19:45 GMT				Stadium: Racecourse Ground; Attendance: 2,056

22 March 2014 39	Barnet	2–0	Hereford United	Canons Park
15:00 GMT				Stadium: The Hive Stadium; Attendance: 1,497

29 March 2014 40	Hereford United	0–1	Grimsby Town	Hereford
15:00 GMT				Stadium: Edgar Street; Attendance: 2,545

5 April 2014 41	Hereford United	0–2	Woking	Hereford
15:00 BST				Stadium: Edgar Street; Attendance: 2,140

8 April 2014 42	Welling United	0–1	Hereford United	Welling
19:45 BST				Stadium: Park View Road; Attendance: 480

12 April 2014 43	Hereford United	0–1	Gateshead	Hereford
15:07 BST				Stadium: Edgar Street; Attendance: 1,783

18 April 2014 44	Tamworth	1–0	Hereford United	Tamworth
19:45 BST				Stadium: The Lamb Ground; Attendance: 1,154

21 April 2014 45	Hereford United	3–2	Alfreton Town	Hereford
15:00 BST	James 29'; Edge (yellow card) 31'; Bush (yellow card) 53'; Collins 61'; Bowen 71', (yellow card) 72'	Report	Akinde 7'; Harrad 87'	Stadium: Edgar Street; Attendance: 2,445; Referee: Justin Amey

26 April 2014 46	Aldershot Town	1–2	Hereford United	Aldershot
17:30 BST	Oyeleke (yellow card) 31', (goal) 76'; Phillips (yellow card) 45+1'; Oastler (yellow card) 89'	Report	Smith 28'; Artus (yellow card) 79'; Rankine 88', (yellow card) 90+4'	Stadium: Recreation Ground; Attendance: 3,593; Referee: Peter Bankes

Source: Football Web Pages

=== FA Cup ===
Hereford entered the competition in the fourth qualifying round.

Win Draw Loss

26 October 2013 Fourth qualifying round	AFC Hornchurch	0–1	Hereford United	Upminster
15:00 GMT	Purcell (yellow card) 5'; Styles (red card) 50'	Report	Purdie (yellow card) 61'; O'Keefe 90'	Stadium: Hornchurch Stadium; Attendance: 713; Referee: Ian Cooper

10 November 2013 First round	Burton Albion	2–0	Hereford United	Burton upon Trent
15:00 GMT	McGurk 37', (yellow card) 64'; Weir (yellow card) 67'; Palmer 84'	Report	Leadbitter (yellow card) 75'	Stadium: Pirelli Stadium; Attendance: 2,069; Referee: Chris Kavanagh

Source: FCHD

=== FA Trophy ===
Hereford entered the competition in the first round.

Win Draw Loss

30 November 2013 First round	Hereford United	0–3	Woking	Hereford
15:00 GMT		Report	Rendell 10', 36'; Marriott 33'	Stadium: Edgar Street; Attendance: 1,041; Referee: Nick Kinseley

Source: FCHD

== Attendances ==
Date	Time	Opponent	Result	Competition	Attendance
10 August 2013	15:00	Braintree Town	1–1	Conference Premier	2,033
24 August 2013	15:00	Tamworth	1–0	Conference Premier	1,864 ▼
31 August 2013	15:00	Welling United	2–1	Conference Premier	1,527 ▼
13 September 2013	19:45	Aldershot Town	0–2	Conference Premier	1,851 ▲
24 September 2013	19:45	Lincoln City	1–0	Conference Premier	1,398 ▼
28 September 2013	15:00	Luton Town	0–0	Conference Premier	2,386 ▲
12 October 2013	15:00	Dartford	2–2	Conference Premier	1,583 ▼
19 October 2013	15:00	Barnet	0–1	Conference Premier	1,632 ▲
12 November 2013	19:45	Chester	2–2	Conference Premier	1,512 ▼
26 November 2013	19:45	FC Halifax Town	3–2	Conference Premier	1,158 ▼
30 November 2013	15:00	Woking	0–3	FA Trophy	1,041 ▼
7 December 2013	15:00	Nuneaton Town	0–1	Conference Premier	1,292 ▲
21 December 2013	15:00	Cambridge United	1–0	Conference Premier	1,558 ▲
28 December 2013	19:30	Forest Green Rovers	1–0	Conference Premier	1,848 ▲
18 January 2014	15:00	Southport	4–1	Conference Premier	1,569 ▼
25 January 2014	15:00	Salisbury City	1–0	Conference Premier	2,016 ▲
28 January 2014	19:45	Kidderminster Harriers	1–1	Conference Premier	2,014 ▼
25 February 2014	19:45	Macclesfield Town	1–2	Conference Premier	1,013 ▼
1 March 2014	15:00	Wrexham	0–2	Conference Premier	1,884 ▲
15 March 2014	15:00	Hyde	0–0	Conference Premier	1,378 ▼
29 March 2014	15:00	Grimsby Town	0–1	Conference Premier	2,545 ▲
5 April 2014	15:00	Woking	0–2	Conference Premier	2,140 ▼
12 April 2014	15:07	Gateshead	0–1	Conference Premier	1,783 ▼
21 April 2014	15:00	Alfreton Town	3–2	Conference Premier	2,445 ▲

Source: Football Web Pages

== Squad statistics ==
As of match played 26 April 2014

=== Appearance and goals ===
- The plus (+) symbol denotes an appearance as a substitute, hence 2+1 indicates two appearances in the starting XI and one appearance as a substitute
- Italics indicate player is/was a loan player
- Players with zero appearances were unused substitutes named in at least one matchday squad

No.	Pos	Nat	Player	Total		Conference Premier		FA Cup		FA Trophy	
No.	Pos	Nat	Player	Apps	Goals	Apps	Goals	Apps	Goals	Apps	Goals
1	GK	(England) ENG	Rhys Evans	22	0	20	0	2	0	0	0
2	DF	(England) ENG	Daniel Leadbitter	41	0	30+8	0	2	0	1	0
3	DF	(England) ENG	Chris Bush	43	3	39+3	3	1	0	0	0
4	MF	(England) ENG	Kingsley James	23	2	21+2	2	0	0	0	0
5	DF	(England) ENG	Rod McDonald	40	2	37	2	2	0	1	0
6	DF	(Wales) WAL	Luke Graham	43	1	42	1	1	0	0	0
7	MF	(England) ENG	Rob Purdie	31	0	21+8	0	2	0	0	0
9	FW	(England) ENG	Dan Walker	46	3	26+17	3	1+1	0	1	0
10	FW	(Scotland) SCO	Chris Sharp	31	2	21+9	2	0+1	0	0	0
11	FW	(England) ENG	Sam Smith	36	4	26+8	4	0+1	0	1	0
12	DF	(England) ENG	Dominic Collins	37	5	32+2	5	1+1	0	1	0
14	DF	(England) ENG	Joel Edwards	5	0	0+4	0	0	0	1	0
15	FW	(England) ENG	Michael Rankine	34	7	25+6	7	2	0	1	0
16	MF	(England) ENG	Frankie Artus	37	1	31+3	1	2	0	1	0
17	FW	(Wales) WAL	Jonathan Brown	38	2	21+15	2	1+1	0	0	0
18	MF	(England) ENG	Danny Pilkington	13	0	4+9	0	0	0	0	0
19	MF	(England) ENG	Sam Gwynne	5	0	4+1	0	0	0	0	0
21	GK	(England) ENG	Daniel Lloyd-Weston	28	0	26+1	0	0	0	1	0
22	MF	(England) ENG	Jamie Edge	12	0	7+5	0	0	0	0	0
30	FW	(Wales) WAL	Cory Williams	10	0	0+10	0	0	0	0	0
32	FW	(England) ENG	Jarrod Bowen	8	1	8	1	0	0	0	0
33	MF	(Republic of Ireland) IRL	Billy Murphy	4	0	4	0	0	0	0	0
Youth team players
34	GK	(Wales) WAL	Owen Evans	0	0	0	0	0	0	0	0
35	GK	(England) ENG	Kyle Moore	0	0	0	0	0	0	0	0
Players who left during the season but made an appearance
8	MF	(Republic of Ireland) IRL	Josh O'Keefe	21	4	18	3	2	1	1	0
20	FW	(England) ENG	Jake Harris	1	0	0+1	0	0	0	0	0
20	FW	(England) ENG	Eric Odhiambo	10	1	2+5	1	2	0	0+1	0
22	MF	(England) ENG	Michael West	8	1	7+1	1	0	0	0	0
23	MF	(England) ENG	Micah Evans	7	0	6	0	0	0	1	0
23	MF	(England) ENG	Paul Green	7	0	7	0	0	0	0	0
23	MF	(France) FRA	Kevin Krans	4	1	2+1	1	1	0	0	0
24	FW	(England) ENG	Richard Brodie	8	1	6+2	1	0	0	0	0
24	MF	(England) ENG	Damon Lathrope	9	0	8	0	0	0	0+1	0
36	FW	(England) ENG	Ross Dyer	5	3	5	3	0	0	0	0

Source: Soccerbase

=== Goals ===
Rank	No.	Pos.	Player	Conference Premier	FA Cup	FA Trophy	Total
1	15	FW	(England) Michael Rankine	7	0	0	7
2	12	DF	(England) Dominic Collins	5	0	0	5
3	8	MF	(Republic of Ireland) Josh O'Keefe	3	1	0	4
3	11	FW	(England) Sam Smith	4	0	0	4
5	3	DF	(England) Chris Bush	3	0	0	3
5	9	FW	(England) Dan Walker	3	0	0	3
5	36	FW	(England) Ross Dyer	3	0	0	3
8	4	MF	(England) Kingsley James	2	0	0	2
8	5	DF	(England) Rod McDonald	2	0	0	2
8	10	FW	(Scotland) Chris Sharp	2	0	0	2
8	17	FW	(Wales) Jonathan Brown	2	0	0	2
12	6	DF	(Wales) Luke Graham	1	0	0	1
12	16	MF	(England) Frankie Artus	1	0	0	1
12	20	FW	(England) Eric Odhiambo	1	0	0	1
12	22	MF	(England) Michael West	1	0	0	1
12	23	MF	(France) Kevin Krans	1	0	0	1
12	24	FW	(England) Richard Brodie	1	0	0	1
12	32	FW	(England) Jarrod Bowen	1	0	0	1
Own goals				1	0	0	1
Total				44	1	0	45
