= 2011–12 Hereford United F.C. season =

Hereford United F.C.
2011–12 season
- Chairman: David Keyte
- Manager: Jamie Pitman (until 5 March); Richard O'Kelly (from 5 March)
- League Two: 23rd (relegated)
- FA Cup: First round
- League Cup: Second round
- Football League Trophy: First round (South West)
- Top goalscorer: League: Tom Barkhuizen (11); All: Tom Barkhuizen (12)
- Highest home attendance: 5,143 v Torquay United, League Two, 5 May 2012
- Lowest home attendance: 1,599 v Aldershot Town, League Two, 13 September 2011
- Average home league attendance: 2,521
- Biggest win: 3–0 v Crawley Town (A), League Two, 28 April 2012
- Biggest defeat: 1–6 v Gillingham (H), League Two, 17 September 2011
Home colours	Away colours

The 2011–12 season was the 91st competitive season of Hereford United Football Club, their third consecutive season in League Two, and 31st overall in the Football League. The club also competed in the FA Cup, League Cup, and Football League Trophy. The season covers the period from 1 June 2011 to 31 May 2012.

== Season summary ==
Hereford began the league season with just one win in their first twelve matches, including heavy home defeats to Morecambe, Macclesfield Town, and Gillingham. In the League Cup, a 1–0 victory over League One side Brentford in the first round earned a visit to Premier League outfit Aston Villa; the Bulls resisted 80 minutes of pressure before succumbing to a 2–0 defeat. Stuart Fleetwood, Hereford's top goalscorer in the 2010–11 season, was sold to Conference side Luton Town on 1 September 2011.

Three consecutive victories in October, which featured veteran defender Andy Todd in his short spell with the Bulls, proved to be Hereford's best run of form in an otherwise lacklustre campaign. Blackpool loanee Tom Barkhuizen was the Bulls' top goalscorer, having extended his loan spell at Edgar Street from its initial planned finish in January through to the end of the campaign.

Despite a 3–2 home victory over Torquay United in the final game of the season, results elsewhere confirmed Hereford's 23rd-placed finish and relegation to the Conference on 5 May 2012. The Whites would not return to the Football League before the club's liquidation in December 2014.

== Players ==
As of 5 May 2012

=== First-team squad ===
Note: Flags indicate national team as defined under FIFA eligibility rules; some limited exceptions apply. Players may hold more than one non-FIFA nationality.

No.	Pos.	Nation	Player
1	GK	ENG	Adam Bartlett
2	DF	WAL	Ryan Green
3	DF	ENG	Joe Heath
4	MF	ENG	Harry Pell
5	DF	ENG	Michael Townsend
6	MF	ENG	Rob Purdie (captain)
7	MF	ENG	James Baxendale (on loan from Doncaster Rovers)
8	MF	ENG	Nicky Featherstone
9	FW	FRA	Yoann Arquin
10	FW	GRN	Delroy Facey
11	MF	ENG	Kenny Lunt
12	DF	ENG	Ben Purkiss
14	MF	NIR	James McQuilkin
16	MF	ENG	Danny Williams
17	MF	ENG	Joe Colbeck
18	MF	ENG	Simon Clist

No.	Pos.	Nation	Player
19	DF	ENG	James Chambers (on loan from Doncaster Rovers)
20	DF	FRA	Benoît Dalibard
21	FW	ENG	Thomas Barkhuizen (on loan from Blackpool)
22	DF	WAL	Byron Anthony (on loan from Bristol Rovers)
24	DF	NED	Stefan Stam
25	FW	ENG	Nathan Elder
26	FW	WAL	Richard Peniket (on loan from Fulham)
27	MF	ENG	Sam Clucas
28	GK	WAL	David Cornell (on loan from Swansea City)
29	GK	WAL	Dan Hanford
30	MF	WAL	Tom John
31	MF	WAL	Louis Feeley
32	DF	WAL	Nathan Perkins
34	MF	ENG	Will Evans
38	GK	ENG	Russell Hoult

=== Out on loan ===
Note: Flags indicate national team as defined under FIFA eligibility rules; some limited exceptions apply. Players may hold more than one non-FIFA nationality.

No.	Pos.	Nation	Player
15	MF	ENG	Tyler Weir (at Worcester City)
23	FW	ENG	Sean Canham (at Bath City)

== League table ==
Pos	Team	Pld	W	D	L	GF	GA	GD	Pts	Promotion, qualification or relegation
20	Northampton Town	46	12	12	22	56	79	−23	48	
21	Plymouth Argyle	46	10	16	20	47	64	−17	46	
22	Barnet	46	12	10	24	52	79	−27	46	
23	Hereford United (R)	46	10	14	22	50	70	−20	44	Relegation to the Conference Premier
24	Macclesfield Town (R)	46	8	13	25	39	64	−25	37	Relegation to the Conference Premier

Updated to match(es) played on 5 May 2012. Source: BBC Sport
Rules for classification: 1) Points; 2) Goal difference; 3) Number of goals scored
(R) Relegated

== Squad statistics ==
=== Appearances and goals ===
As of 8 May 2012

No.	Pos	Nat	Player	Total		League Two		FA Cup		League Cup		FL Trophy	
No.	Pos	Nat	Player	Apps	Goals	Apps	Goals	Apps	Goals	Apps	Goals	Apps	Goals
1	GK	(England) ENG	Adam Bartlett	20	0	18+0	0	0+0	0	1+0	0	1+0	0
2	DF	(Wales) WAL	Ryan Green	31	0	26+2	0	1+0	0	2+0	0	0+0	0
3	DF	(England) ENG	Joe Heath	21	0	15+2	0	1+0	0	2+0	0	1+0	0
4	MF	(England) ENG	Harry Pell	34	3	22+8	3	1+0	0	2+0	0	1+0	0
5	DF	(England) ENG	Michael Townsend	42	0	36+3	0	1+0	0	1+0	0	1+0	0
6	MF	(England) ENG	Rob Purdie	36	4	34+0	4	1+0	0	1+0	0	0+0	0
7	MF	(England) ENG	James Baxendale	1	0	0+1	0	0+0	0	0+0	0	0+0	0
8	MF	(England) ENG	Nicky Featherstone	40	0	36+2	0	1+0	0	1+0	0	0+0	0
9	FW	(France) FRA	Yoann Arquin	38	9	16+18	8	0+1	0	0+2	1	1+0	0
10	FW	(Grenada) GRN	Delroy Facey	43	6	32+8	6	0+1	0	2+0	0	0+0	0
11	MF	(England) ENG	Kenny Lunt	28	0	24+1	0	0+0	0	1+1	0	1+0	0
12	DF	(England) ENG	Ben Purkiss	15	0	15+0	0	0+0	0	0+0	0	0+0	0
14	MF	(Northern Ireland) NIR	James McQuilkin	11	0	3+4	0	1+0	0	2+0	0	0+1	0
15	MF	(England) ENG	Tyler Weir	0	0	0+0	0	0+0	0	0+0	0	0+0	0
16	MF	(England) ENG	Danny Williams	6	0	3+2	0	0+0	0	1+0	0	0+0	0
17	MF	(England) ENG	Joe Colbeck	30	1	19+9	1	0+0	0	2+0	0	0+0	0
18	MF	(England) ENG	Simon Clist	30	0	27+1	0	1+0	0	0+0	0	1+0	0
19	DF	(England) ENG	James Chambers	7	0	7+0	0	0+0	0	0+0	0	0+0	0
20	DF	(France) FRA	Benoit Dalibard	10	0	9+1	0	0+0	0	0+0	0	0+0	0
21	FW	(England) ENG	Thomas Barkhuizen	39	12	32+6	11	0+0	0	0+0	0	1+0	1
22	DF	(Wales) WAL	Byron Anthony	15	1	13+2	1	0+0	0	0+0	0	0+0	0
23	FW	(England) ENG	Sean Canham	0	0	0+0	0	0+0	0	0+0	0	0+0	0
24	DF	(Netherlands) NED	Stefan Stam	26	0	21+3	0	0+0	0	1+0	0	1+0	0
25	FW	(England) ENG	Nathan Elder	27	3	13+13	3	1+0	0	0+0	0	0+0	0
26	FW	(Wales) WAL	Richard Peniket	7	0	4+3	0	0+0	0	0+0	0	0+0	0
27	MF	(England) ENG	Sam Clucas	18	0	3+14	0	1+0	0	0+0	0	0+0	0
28	GK	(Wales) WAL	David Cornell	29	0	26+0	0	1+0	0	1+0	0	0+1	0
29	GK	(Wales) WAL	Dan Hanford	0	0	0+0	0	0+0	0	0+0	0	0+0	0
30	MF	(Wales) WAL	Tom John	1	0	0+0	0	0+0	0	0+1	0	0+0	0
31	MF	(Wales) WAL	Louis Feeley	0	0	0+0	0	0+0	0	0+0	0	0+0	0
32	DF	(Wales) WAL	Nathan Perkins	0	0	0+0	0	0+0	0	0+0	0	0+0	0
34	MF	(England) ENG	Will Evans	27	5	21+4	5	0+1	0	0+0	0	1+0	0
38	GK	(England) ENG	Russell Hoult	2	0	2+0	0	0+0	0	0+0	0	0+0	0
Players who played for Hereford this season who have since left the club:
7	FW	(Wales) WAL	Stuart Fleetwood	8	0	4+1	0	0+0	0	2+0	0	0+1	0
7	MF	(Scotland) SCO	Steven Leslie	10	2	10+0	2	0+0	0	0+0	0	0+0	0
12	GK	(Republic of Ireland) IRL	Dan Connor	0	0	0+0	0	0+0	0	0+0	0	0+0	0
19	FW	(England) ENG	Lyle Taylor	8	2	6+2	2	0+0	0	0+0	0	0+0	0
19	DF	(Wales) WAL	Kyle McCarthy	0	0	0+0	0	0+0	0	0+0	0	0+0	0
19	DF	(England) ENG	Jordan Rose	0	0	0+0	0	0+0	0	0+0	0	0+0	0
22	DF	(Hungary) HUN	János Kovács	0	0	0+0	0	0+0	0	0+0	0	0+0	0
26	FW	(England) ENG	Sam Winnall	9	2	5+3	2	0+0	0	0+0	0	1+0	0
29	DF	(England) ENG	Andy Todd	4	0	4+0	0	0+0	0	0+0	0	0+0	0
–	DF	(England) ENG	Kern Miller	0	0	0+0	0	0+0	0	0+0	0	0+0	0

=== Top scorers ===
Place	Position	Nation	Number	Name	League Two	FA Cup	League Cup	FL Trophy	Total
1	FW	(England)	21	Thomas Barkhuizen	11	0	0	1	12
2	FW	(France)	9	Yoann Arquin	8	0	1	0	9
3	FW	(Grenada)	10	Delroy Facey	6	0	0	0	6
4	MF	(England)	34	Will Evans	5	0	0	0	5
5	MF	(England)	6	Rob Purdie	4	0	0	0	4
6	FW	(England)	25	Nathan Elder	3	0	0	0	3
=	MF	(England)	4	Harry Pell	3	0	0	0	3
8	FW	(England)	19	Lyle Taylor	2	0	0	0	2
=	FW	(England)	26	Sam Winnall	2	0	0	0	2
=	MF	(Scotland)	7	Steve Leslie	2	0	0	0	2
11	MF	(England)	17	Joe Colbeck	1	0	0	0	1
=	DF	(Wales)	22	Byron Anthony	1	0	0	0	1
				Own goals	2	0	0	0	2
				TOTALS	50	0	1	1	52

=== Disciplinary record ===
Number	Nation	Position	Name	League Two		FA Cup		League Cup		FL Trophy		Total	
Number	Nation	Position	Name	Yellow card	Red card	Yellow card	Red card	Yellow card	Red card	Yellow card	Red card	Yellow card	Red card
4	(England)	MF	Harry Pell	7	0	0	0	0	0	0	0	7	0
6	(England)	MF	Rob Purdie	7	0	0	0	0	0	0	0	7	0
17	(England)	MF	Joe Colbeck	5	0	0	0	1	0	0	0	6	0
3	(England)	DF	Joe Heath	5	0	0	0	0	0	0	0	5	0
9	(France)	FW	Yoann Arquin	5	0	0	0	0	0	0	0	5	0
18	(England)	MF	Simon Clist	4	0	1	0	0	0	0	0	5	0
5	(England)	DF	Michael Townsend	4	2	0	0	0	0	0	0	4	2
8	(England)	MF	Nicky Featherstone	4	0	0	0	0	0	0	0	4	0
22	(Wales)	DF	Byron Anthony	4	0	0	0	0	0	0	0	4	0
12	(England)	DF	Ben Purkiss	3	1	0	0	0	0	0	0	3	1
2	(Wales)	DF	Ryan Green	3	0	0	0	0	0	0	0	3	0
11	(England)	MF	Kenny Lunt	3	0	0	0	0	0	0	0	3	0
24	(Netherlands)	DF	Stefan Stam	2	0	0	0	0	0	1	0	3	0
20	(France)	DF	Benoit Dalibard	2	1	0	0	0	0	0	0	2	1
7	(Wales)	FW	Stuart Fleetwood	2	0	0	0	0	0	0	0	2	0
28	(Wales)	GK	David Cornell	2	0	0	0	0	0	0	0	2	0
27	(England)	MF	Sam Clucas	2	0	0	0	0	0	0	0	2	0
34	(England)	MF	Will Evans	1	0	0	0	0	0	1	0	2	0
25	(England)	FW	Nathan Elder	1	0	0	0	0	0	0	0	1	0
21	(England)	MF	Thomas Barkhuizen	1	0	0	0	0	0	0	0	1	0
26	(England)	FW	Sam Winnall	1	0	0	0	0	0	0	0	1	0
14	(Northern Ireland)	MF	James McQuilkin	1	0	0	0	0	0	0	0	1	0
			TOTALS	69	4	1	0	1	0	2	0	73	4

== Results ==
=== Pre-season friendlies ===
23 July 2011	Hereford United	0–0	Birmingham City	Edgar Street
15:00				Attendance: 2,848

26 July 2011	AFC Telford United	3–1	Hereford United	New Bucks Head
19:45	Newton 3' (pen.); Rooney 31'; Brown (?)		Facey (?)	Attendance: 635

30 July 2011	Forest Green Rovers	3–0	Hereford United	The New Lawn
15:00	Norwood 20'; Styche 57'; Rowe 64'			Attendance: 573; Referee: A. Matthews

1 August 2011	Hereford United	0–3	Bolton Wanderers	Edgar Street
19:45			Eagles 14'; Pratley 59'; K. Davies 61'	Attendance: 2,250

=== League Two ===
6 August 2011 1	Southend United	1–0	Hereford United	Roots Hall
15:00	Bilel 14'			Attendance: 5,105

13 August 2011 2	Hereford United	0–3	Morecambe	Edgar Street
15:00			Carlton 37'; Jevons 45'; Drummond 65'	Attendance: 2,045

16 August 2011 3	Hereford United	0–4	Macclesfield Town	Edgar Street
19:45			Diagne 53'; Draper 81'; Tomlinson 90', 90+2'	Attendance: 1,609

20 August 2011 4	AFC Wimbledon	1–1	Hereford United	Kingsmeadow
15:00	Midson 25'		Facey 8'	Attendance: 4,239

27 August 2011 5	Bristol Rovers	0–0	Hereford United	Memorial Stadium
15:00				Attendance: 6,342

3 September 2011 6	Hereford United	1–0	Dagenham & Redbridge	Edgar Street
15:00	Winnall 85'			Attendance: 1,885

10 September 2011 7	Shrewsbury Town	3–1	Hereford United	Greenhous Meadow
13:00	Morgan 7', 79'; Wright 48'		Barkhuizen 73'	Attendance: 5,684

13 September 2011 8	Hereford United	0–2	Aldershot Town	Edgar Street
19:45			Rankine 19'; Vincenti 82'	Attendance: 1,599

17 September 2011 9	Hereford United	1–6	Gillingham	Edgar Street
15:00	Winnall 87'		Nouble 19'; Richards 24'; Heath 40' (o.g.); Jackman 49'; Whelpdale 79'; Payne 83'	Attendance: 1,848

24 September 2011 10	Cheltenham Town	0–0	Hereford United	Abbey Business Stadium
15:00				Attendance: 3,011

1 October 2011 11	Hereford United	0–1	Oxford United	Edgar Street
15:00			Hall 32'	Attendance: 2,502

8 October 2011 12	Swindon Town	3–3	Hereford United	The County Ground
15:00	De Vita 7'; Kerrouche 40'; Ferry 79'		Berkhuizen 67'; Arquin 76'; Pell 90'	Attendance: 7,456

15 October 2011 13	Hereford United	2–0	Bradford City	Edgar Street
15:00	Leslie 79'; Berkhuizen 89'			Attendance: 2,462

22 October 2011 14	Hereford United	1–0	Barnet	Edgar Street
15:00	Elder 66'			Attendance: 2,124

25 October 2011 15	Northampton Town	1–3	Hereford United	Sixfields Stadium
19:45	Berahino 63'		Elder 66'; Leslie 20'; Pell 71'	Attendance: 3,643

29 October 2011 16	Torquay United	2–0	Hereford United	Plainmoor
15:00	Nicholson 40'; Bodin 44'			Attendance: 2,459

5 November 2011 17	Hereford United	1–1	Crawley Town	Edgar Street
15:00	Barkhuizen 9'		Drury 41'	Attendance: 2,227

19 November 2011 18	Hereford United	2–3	Burton Albion	Edgar Street
15:00	Purdie 19' (pen.); Barkhuizen 34'		Zola 24'; Webster 90+1'; Kee 90+3'	Attendance: 2,136

26 November 2011 19	Crewe Alexandra	1–0	Hereford United	Alexandra Stadium
15:00	Powell 60'			Attendance: 3,591

10 December 2011 20	Hereford United	2–3	Rotherham United	Edgar Street
15:00	Arquin 34'; Facey 42'		Mullins 13', 65'; Revell 23'	Attendance: 1,908

17 December 2011 21	Plymouth Argyle	1–1	Hereford United	Home Park
15:00	Chadwick 81' (pen.)		Barkhuizen 67'	Attendance: 6,531

26 December 2011 22	Hereford United	1–2	Port Vale	Edgar Street
13:30	Barkhuizen 55'		Yates 78'; Richards 84' (pen.)	Attendance: 3,097

30 December 2011 23	Hereford United	1–1	Accrington Stanley	Edgar Street
20:00	Arquin 5'		Evans 72'	Attendance: 2,057

2 January 2012 24	Burton Albion	0–2	Hereford United	Pirelli Stadium
15:00			Evans 23'; Arquin 78'	Attendance: 3,322

10 January 2012 25	Hereford United	1–2	Bristol Rovers	Edgar Street
19:45	Facey 49'		L. Brown 9'; McGleish 72'	Attendance: 2,411

14 January 2012 26	Dagenham & Redbridge	0–1	Hereford United	Victoria Road
15:00	Arquin 39'			Attendance: 1,732

21 January 2012 27	Oxford United	2–2	Hereford United	Kassam Stadium
15:00	Pittman 12'; Duberry 90'		Duberry 32' (o.g.) 86' (o.g.)	Attendance: 6,630

28 January 2012 28	Hereford United	0–2	Shrewsbury Town	Edgar Street
15:00			Gornell 16'; Collins 27'	Attendance: 3,515

11 February 2012 29	Hereford United	1–1	Cheltenham Town	Edgar Street
15:00	Facey 12'		Mohamed 49'	Attendance: 2607

14 February 2012 30	Aldershot Town	1–0	Hereford United	Recreation Ground
19:45	Madjo 53'			Attendance: 1871

18 February 2012 31	Hereford United	1–2	Swindon Town	Edgar Street
15:00	Purdie 65'		Caddis 39' (pen.); Benson 62'	Attendance: 3068

25 February 2012 32	Bradford City	1–1	Hereford United	Valley Parade
15:00	Syers 88'		Anthony 82'	Attendance: 17014

28 February 2012 33	Gillingham	5–4	Hereford United	MEMS Priestfield Stadium
19:45	Whelpdale 45'; Kedwell 46'; Lee 81' 88'; Tomlin 90'		Purdie 4' (pen.); Barkhuizen 7' 70'; Evans 80'	Attendance: 3784

3 March 2012 34	Hereford United	2–1	AFC Wimbledon	Edgar Street
15:00	Taylor 18'; Barkhuizen 34'		Midson 68'	Attendance: 2147

6 March 2012 35	Macclesfield Town	2–2	Hereford United	Moss Rose
19:45	Wedgbury 48'; Hamshaw 79'		Evans 1' 26'	Attendance: 1676

10 March 2012 36	Morecambe	0–1	Hereford United	Globe Arena
15:00			Taylor 27'	Attendance: 1653

17 March 2012 37	Hereford United	2–3	Southend United	Edgar Street
15:00	Arquin 45' (pen.); Elder 88'		Harris 2'; Benyon 33'; Hall 57'	Attendance: 2456

20 March 2012 38	Port Vale	1–0	Hereford United	Vale Park
19:45	M.Richards 86'			Attendance: 3959

24 March 2012 39	Hereford United	0–1	Crewe Alexandra	Edgar Street
15:00			Murphy 79'	Attendance: 2326

31 March 2012 40	Rotherham United	1–0	Hereford United	Don Valley Stadium
15:00	Grabban 43'			Attendance: 3,237

6 April 2012 41	Hereford United	1–1	Plymouth Argyle	Edgar Street
15:00	Barkhuizen 52'		Stam 32' (o.g.)	Attendance: 4597

9 April 2012 42	Accrington Stanley	2–1	Hereford United	Crown Ground
15:00	Grant 47'; Amond 85'		Evans 57'	Attendance: 1749

13 April 2012 43	Barnet	1–1	Hereford United	Underhill Stadium
19:45	May 31'		Facey 11'	Attendance: 3189

21 April 2012 44	Hereford United	0–0	Northampton Town	Edgar Street
15:00				Attendance: 2970

28 April 2012 45	Crawley Town	0–3	Hereford United	Broadfield Stadium
15:00			Colbeck 55'; Arquin 77' 83'	Attendance: 4615

5 May 2012 46	Hereford United	3–2	Torquay United	Edgar Street
15:00	Facey 11'; Townsend (yellow card) 27'; Pell 36' (pen.); Purdie 40'; Anthony (yellow card) 85'		Jarvis 46'; Atieno 63'; Mansell (yellow card) 85'	Attendance: 5,143

=== FA Cup ===
12 November 2011 Round 1	Hereford United	0–3	Yeovil Town	Edgar Street
15:00			Upson 25'; A.Williams 57'; Blizzard 72'	Attendance: 2,469

=== League Cup ===
9 August 2011 Round 1	Hereford United	1–0	Brentford	Edgar Street
19:45	Arquin 90+2'			Attendance: 1,767

23 August 2011 Round 2	Aston Villa	2–0	Hereford United	Villa Park
19:45	Lichaj 80'; Delfouneso 88'			Attendance: 21,058

=== FL Trophy ===
30 August 2011 Round 1	Bournemouth	4–1	Hereford United	Seward Stadium
19:45	Pugh 39'; Stockley 66', 77'; MacDonald 84'		Barkhuizen 12'	Attendance: 2,489

== Transfers ==
Players transferred in
Date	Pos.	Name	Previous club	Fee	Ref.
3 June 2011	DF	(England) Joe Heath	(England) Exeter City	Free	
24 June 2011	FW	(Grenada) Delroy Facey	(England) Lincoln City	Free	
1 July 2011	DF	(Netherlands) Stefan Stam	(England) Yeovil Town	Free	
8 July 2011	MF	(England) Harry Pell	(England) Bristol Rovers	Free	
25 July 2011	FW	(France) Yoann Arquin	(France) Red Star	€100	
8 August 2011	MF	(England) Danny Williams	(England) AFC Telford United	Free	
18 August 2011	DF	(France) Benoit Dalibard	(France) Guingamp	Free	
16 September 2011	DF	(England) Jordan Rose	(England) Eastleigh	Free	
13 October 2011	DF	(England) Andy Todd	(England) Oldham Athletic	Free	
11 November 2011	MF	(England) Sam Clucas	(England) Glenn Hoddle Academy	Free	
17 December 2011	GK	(Wales) Dan Hanford	(England) Glenn Hoddle Academy	Free	
1 January 2012	DF	(England) Will Evans	(England) Swindon Town	Free	
3 January 2012	MF	(England) Simon Clist	(England) Oxford United	Free	
6 January 2012	FW	(England) Nathan Elder	(England) Hayes & Yeading United	Free	
24 January 2012	DF	(England) Ben Purkiss	(England) Oxford United	Free	
Players transferred out
Date	Pos.	Name	To	Fee	Ref.
1 September 2011	FW	(Wales) Stuart Fleetwood	(England) Luton Town	Undisclosed	
1 September 2011	DF	(Wales) Kyle McCarthy	(Wales) UWIC	Free	
23 September 2011	DF	(England) Jordan Rose	(England) Hayes & Yeading United	Free	
2 January 2012	DF	(Hungary) Janos Kovacs	(England) Luton Town	Free	
Players loaned in
Date from	Pos.	Name	From	Date to	Ref.
18 August 2011	MF	(England) Simon Clist	(England) Oxford United	3 January 2012	
19 August 2011	GK	(Wales) David Cornell	(Wales) Swansea City	End of season	
25 August 2011	FW	(England) Thomas Barkhuizen	(England) Blackpool	End of season	
25 August 2011	DF	(England) Will Evans	(England) Swindon Town	25 November 2011	
27 August 2011	FW	(England) Sam Winnall	(England) Wolverhampton Wanderers	27 September 2011	
30 September 2011	FW	(England) Nathan Elder	(England) Hayes & Yeading United	3 January 2012	
6 October 2011	MF	(Scotland) Steven Leslie	(England) Shrewsbury Town	5 January 2012	
1 November 2011	FW	(Wales) Richard Peniket	(England) Fulham	End of season	
9 January 2012	DF	(England) Kern Miller	(England) Barnsley	16 February 2012	
9 February 2012	FW	(England) Lyle Taylor	(England) Bournemouth	9 March 2012	
17 February 2012	DF	(Wales) Byron Anthony	(England) Bristol Rovers	End of season	
22 March 2012	MF	(England) James Baxendale	(England) Doncaster Rovers	End of Season	
22 March 2012	DF	(England) James Chambers	(England) Doncaster Rovers	End of Season	
Players loaned out
Date from	Pos.	Name	To	Date to	Ref.
12 August 2011	MF	(England) Tyler Weir	(England) Gloucester City	7 January 2012	
19 September 2011	DF	(Hungary) Janos Kovacs	(England) Luton Town	1 January 2012	
30 September 2011	FW	(England) Sean Canham	(England) Bath City	End of Season	
9 January 2012	MF	(England) Tyler Weir	(England) Worcester City	End of season	
12 January 2012	MF	(Northern Ireland) James McQuilkin	(England) Kidderminster Harriers	14 February 2012	
22 March 2012	MF	(England) Harry Pell	(England) Cambridge United	22 April 2012	

== Awards ==
End of Season Awards	Winner
Player of the Year	Rob Purdie
Players' Player of the Year	Michael Townsend
