= Tom John =

Welsh footballer

Personal information
- Full name: Thomas James John
- Date of birth: 22 March 1995 (age 31)
- Place of birth: Bridgend, Wales
- Position: Midfielder

Youth career
- –2011: Swansea City

Senior career*
Years	Team	Apps	(Gls)
2011–2012	Hereford United	0	(0)
- * Club domestic league appearances and goals as of 19:16, 23 October 2011 (UTC)

Thomas James John (born 22 March 1995) is a Welsh footballer.

== Career ==
John was born in Port Talbot, Wales. He started his career in the youth team of Hereford United, and was one of five signed on a scholarship by John Layton. He made his professional debut for the club in a League Cup second-round tie against Aston Villa in a 2–0 defeat, replacing Stuart Fleetwood in the final minute.

Following his release from Hereford United, John retired from playing football.

In 2017, he joined Southampton academy as their schoolboys strength and conditioning lead.

After five years at Southampton, in 2023, he joined Arsenal as their lead academy performance coach for the age ranges of under-9 to under-16.

== Career statistics ==
Appearances and goals by club, season and competition
Club	Season	League			FA Cup		League Cup		Other		Total	
Club	Season	Division	Apps	Goals	Apps	Goals	Apps	Goals	Apps	Goals	Apps	Goals
Hereford United	2011–12	League Two	0	0	0	0	1	0	0	0	1	0
Career total			0	0	0	0	1	0	0	0	0	0
