= Danny Williams (footballer, born 1981) =

English footballer and agent

Personal information
- Full name: Daniel Josef Williams
- Date of birth: 2 March 1981 (age 45)
- Place of birth: Sheffield, England
- Height: 1.75 m (5 ft 9 in)
- Position: Midfielder

Senior career*
Years	Team	Apps	(Gls)
1999–2002	Chesterfield	31	(0)
2002–2005	Hereford United	108	(22)
2005–2006	Stevenage Borough	16	(1)
2006–2007	Forest Green Rovers	19	(1)
2007	Rushden & Diamonds	12	(1)
2007–2009	Northwich Victoria	25	(3)
2009–2011	R.R.F.C. Montegnée	48	(31)
2011	AFC Telford United	6	(0)
2011	Hereford United	5	(0)
Total		270	(59)
- * Club domestic league appearances and goals

Danny Williams (born 2 March 1981) is an English former professional footballer who is now an FA licensed agent.

He started his career at Chesterfield where after making his debut at turf moor (Burnley) aged 18 he went on to become a regular in his third season, before being released in 2002, like many players due to the ITV Digital saga. He was signed by Hereford United where he spent a further three seasons, almost gaining promotion to the Football League in the 2003–04 season. He scored two goals in a televised 9–0 win over Dagenham & Redbridge

His next club was Stevenage Borough under Graham Westley but after a good start, coming on as a substitute against Crawley Town and scoring from a free-kick with his first touch, his season was curtailed due to injury. The following season, he had spells at fellow Conference clubs Forest Green Rovers and later Rushden & Diamonds, being released from the latter in the summer of 2007. He later moved to Northwich and in January 2009 joined Belgian side R.R.F.C. Montegnée.

In Belgium Williams was part of an attacking trio, consisting of Williams, Ehui, and Paul Taylor, the trio would go on to score goals and win promotion, Williams notably scoring two goals in the play-off final.

After two seasons in Belgium, March 2011 he joined Conference North side, AFC Telford United and gained promotion to the National Conference via the play-offs.

Williams returned to Hereford United in August 2011 after being on trial, impressing manager Jamie Pitman. His first start back at his old club, came in the League Cup tie in front of a crowd of 21,058 at Villa Park, the home of Premier League side Aston Villa.
