= Harry Pell =

Retired English footballer (born 1991)

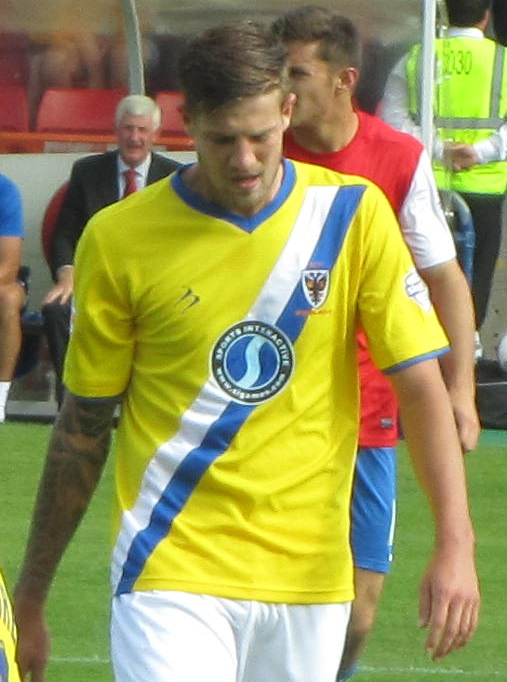
- Pell playing for AFC Wimbledon in 2013

Personal information
- Full name: Harry David Balraj Pell
- Date of birth: 21 October 1991 (age 35)
- Place of birth: Tilbury, England
- Height: 6 ft 4 in (1.93 m)
- Position: Midfielder

Team information
- Current team: Hereford (assistant manager)

Youth career
- 1998–2009: Charlton Athletic

Senior career*
Years	Team	Apps	(Gls)
2009–2010	Charlton Athletic	0	(0)
2010	→ Hastings United (loan)	16	(4)
2010–2011	Bristol Rovers	10	(0)
2011	→ Hereford United (loan)	7	(0)
2011–2013	Hereford United	53	(4)
2012	→ Cambridge United (loan)	7	(2)
2013–2015	AFC Wimbledon	59	(6)
2014	→ Grimsby Town (loan)	5	(0)
2015	Eastleigh	13	(0)
2015–2018	Cheltenham Town	118	(19)
2018–2021	Colchester United	78	(11)
2021–2022	Accrington Stanley	38	(6)
2022–2024	AFC Wimbledon	54	(4)
2024–2025	Cheltenham Town	3	(0)
2025–2026	Bath City	2	(0)
Total		463	(56)
- * Club domestic league appearances and goals

Harry David Balraj Pell (born 21 October 1991) is a former English professional footballer who played as a midfielder. He is currently assistant manager of Hereford.

Pell came through the youth system at Charlton Athletic where he spent 12 years. He spent time on loan at Hastings United in 2010, before moving to Bristol Rovers. He joined Hereford United in 2011, initially on loan, later signing permanently. He then had a loan spell at Cambridge United and then moved to AFC Wimbledon in 2013. He had another loan spell, this time at Grimsby Town in 2014, moving to Eastleigh in 2015. He spent three years with Cheltenham Town between 2015 and 2018, and then signed for Colchester United in May 2018.

== Career ==
=== Early years ===
Pell was born in Tilbury, Essex. He joined the youth set-up at Charlton Athletic at the age of seven and for the next 11 years he progressed through "The Addicks'" youth system. In the 2008–09 season, his first as a professional, he made 22 appearances for the under-18 squad. The following season, Pell scored for Charlton Athletic in a 3–0 win over Gillingham in the First Round of the 2009–10 FA Youth Cup on 4 November 2009. In spite of this, the 18-year-old midfielder failed to break into the first team and was sent out on loan to Isthmian League Premier Division side Hastings United on 18 January 2010. He stayed with "The Arrows" for the remainder of the season, scoring four goals in 16 appearances. Despite his promising performances, however, the 18-year-old midfielder was released by Charlton Athletic at the end of the 2009–10 season. After trials at Gillingham, Bristol Rovers and Wycombe Wanderers, he signed for League One side Bristol Rovers on a one-year contract on 28 May 2010.

=== Bristol Rovers ===
Pell featured as an unused substitute ten times for Bristol Rovers before finally making his debut on 13 November 2010, coming on as a 74th minute substitute for Stuart Campbell in a 3–0 defeat by Leyton Orient. In January 2011, having still made just one appearance for Bristol Rovers, he was loaned out to Hereford United on an initial one-month deal on 31 January 2011 so that he might gain more match time. His loan was extended by a further month on 1 March 2011, with the 20-year-old having helped Hereford United to five wins in his six appearances for the club. Having produced a string of impressive performances for "The Bulls", Pell's extended loan was cut short and he was recalled by Bristol Rovers on 7 March 2011. On his return to "The Pirates" the midfielder was rewarded with nine more games in the first team as well as winning the club's Young Player of the Year award at the end of the season. He was offered a new contract at the end of the 2010–11 season after his initial one-year deal had expired, however Pell left the club on 30 June 2011 and opted to re-join Hereford United on a permanent deal.

=== Hereford United ===
Pell signed a two-year contract with "The Bulls" on 8 July 2011. He scored his first goal for Hereford United on 8 October 2011 in a 3–3 draw against Swindon Town, clinching the winner in the 90th minute of play. The midfielder scored his second three games later on 25 October 2011 in a 3–1 win over Northampton Town. On 22 March 2012, it was announced that Pell had joined Cambridge United on a one-month emergency loan. He made his debut for Cambridge United on 3 April 2012 in a 1–0 victory over Lincoln City. Pell scored his first goal for Cambridge United on 9 April 2012 in a 2–0 win over Kettering Town. His second followed the next game in a 3–1 win over Barrow on 14 April 2012. On 19 April 2012, Pell was recalled by Hereford United in a bid to help save the club from relegation from the Football League. Pell scored a penalty in a 3–2 win over Torquay United in the last game of the 2011–12 season, on 5 May 2012. However, the win came too late to save "The Bulls" from relegation to the Conference National for the 2012–13 season. In the second league game of the 2012–13 season, on 14 August 2012, he scored what would be his last goal for Hereford United in a 2–2 draw with Tamworth.

=== AFC Wimbledon ===
On 28 January 2013, it was announced that Pell had signed for League Two side AFC Wimbledon on a two-and-a-half-year deal for an undisclosed fee, believed to be in the region of £30,000. He made his debut for AFC Wimbledon on 2 February 2013 in a 1–1 draw against Burton Albion. On 26 February 2013, Pell scored his first goal for AFC Wimbledon in a 1–1 draw against Plymouth Argyle. On 9 March 2013, he scored the winning goal for the Dons in a 3–2 victory over York City. Pell scored "The Dons" first goal of the 2013–14 season, and the third of his AFC Wimbledon career, in a 1–1 draw against Torquay United at Plainmoor on 3 August 2013.

In the 2014–15 season, Pell struggled for first team place and spent most of the first half of the season on the bench. Struggling for the first team place at Wimbledon frustrated him. On 29 October 2014, Pell joined Grimsby Town on an initial one-month loan. Pell struggled being away from his young family. Pell decided to sign for Eastleigh on 29 January for the rest of the season, which the team reached the playoffs of the national league.

=== Cheltenham Town ===
Pell signed for Cheltenham town at the start of the 2015–16 campaign, of which Gary Johnson labelled him one of his key signings. Pell became a national league title winner, His efforts over the season earned him a place in the 2015–16 National League team of the year, alongside the league's outstanding players.

=== Colchester United ===
On 10 May 2018, Pell completed a transfer to Colchester United for an undisclosed six-figure fee on a three-year contract. He made his competitive debut on 4 August, playing the full 90-minutes of a 0–0 draw with Notts County. On 1 September, he scored his first goal for Colchester against his former club Cheltenham from the penalty spot in a 3–1 win for the U's.

Pell was named club captain on 4 September 2020 ahead of the 2020–21 season, following Luke Prosser's summer departure.

After three years with Colchester, Pell left the Essex club at the end of his contract in May 2021. He made 89 appearances and scored 13 goals for the U's.

=== Accrington Stanley ===
League One side Accrington Stanley announced the signing of Pell on a three-year contract on 14 May 2021, the same day as his release from Colchester was announced.

=== AFC Wimbledon return ===
On 24 August 2022, Pell returned to former club AFC Wimbledon for an undisclosed fee on a two-year contract.

On 22 March 2024, following AFC Wimbledon's 1–0 home win over MK Dons on 2 March 2024, Pell was issued a one-match ban and fined £1,000 by the FA after admitting kicking balls at MK Dons supporters during the pre-match warm-up. Pell responded in a letter to the FA that "on mature reflection, I should have simply ignored the shouts and got on with my warm-up."

The club announced Pell's departure at the end of the 2023–24 season.

=== Return to Cheltenham ===
Pell rejoined former club Cheltenham Town for the 2024/25 season and was named club captain for the season. However Pell ruptured his anterior cruciate ligament which resulted in him being ruled him out for the majority of the season.

He returned to the team after overcoming his injury but only made five appearances for the team.

On 9 December 2025, it was announced via a club statement that Pell's contract had been terminated by mutual agreement.

=== Bath City ===
On 18 December 2025, Pell joined Bath City.

On 26 January 2026, Pell announced that, following medical consultations and consideration for his future, he had made the decision to retire as a footballer.

== Coaching career ==
In February 2026, Pell joined the first-team coaching staff as assistant manager of National League North club Hereford, phoenix club of Pell's former club Hereford United working alongside best friend Aaron Downes.

The duo went in with the side 11 points in the relegation zone with 21 games remaining. Hereford FC managed to secure there status in the division on the last day of the season. On the same day, chairman Chris Ammonds announced to the Hereford supporters that both Aaron Downes and Pell had signed two year contracts with the club.

== Career statistics ==
As of match played 26 December 2025

Appearances and goals by club, season and competition
Club	Season	League			FA Cup		League Cup		Other^{[A]}		Total	
Club	Season	Division	Apps	Goals	Apps	Goals	Apps	Goals	Apps	Goals	Apps	Goals
Charlton Athletic	2009–10	League One	0	0	0	0	0	0	0	0	0	0
Hastings United (loan)	2009–10	Isthmian League	16	4	0	0	–		3	0	19	4
Bristol Rovers	2010–11	League One	10	0	0	0	0	0	0	0	10	0
Hereford United (loan)	2010–11	League Two	7	0	0	0	0	0	0	0	7	0
Hereford United	2011–12	League Two	30	3	1	0	2	0	1 (Note: Appearances in Football League Trophy)	0	34	3
Hereford United	2012–13	Conference Premier	23	1	4	0	–		2 (Note: Appearances in FA Trophy)	0	29	1
Hereford United	Total		53	4	5	0	2	0	3	0	63	4
Cambridge United (loan)	2011–12	Conference Premier	7	2	0	0	–		0	0	7	2
AFC Wimbledon	2012–13	League Two	17	2	0	0	0	0	0	0	17	2
AFC Wimbledon	2013–14	League Two	33	4	1	0	1	0	1	0	36	4
AFC Wimbledon	2014–15	League Two	9	0	2	0	0	0	1	0	12	0
AFC Wimbledon	Total		59	6	3	0	1	0	2	0	65	6
Grimsby Town (loan)	2014–15	Conference Premier	5	0	–		–		0	0	5	0
Eastleigh	2014–15	Conference Premier	13	0	–		–		1 (Note: Appearance in Conference play-offs)	0	14	0
Cheltenham Town	2015–16	National League	39	7	3	0	–		0	0	42	7
Cheltenham Town	2016–17	League Two	42	7	3	1	2	1	5 (Note: Appearance(s) in EFL Trophy)	0	52	9
Cheltenham Town	2017–18	League Two	37	5	1	0	2	0	2	1	42	6
Cheltenham Town	Total		118	19	7	1	4	1	7	1	136	22
Colchester United	2018–19	League Two	31	6	1	0	1	0	1	1	34	7
Colchester United	2019–20	League Two	22	3	0	0	1	0	4 (Note: Two appearances in EFL Trophy, two appearances in EFL League Two play-offs)	0	27	3
Colchester United	2020–21	League Two	25	2	1	1	1	0	1	0	28	3
Colchester United	Total		78	11	2	1	3	0	6	1	89	13
Accrington Stanley	2021–22	League One	37	6	1	0	1	0	2	2	41	8
Accrington Stanley	2022–23	League One	1	0	0	0	1	0	0	0	2	0
Accrington Stanley	Total		38	6	1	0	2	0	2	2	43	8
AFC Wimbledon	2022–23	League Two	28	3	3	0	–		2	0	33	3
AFC Wimbledon	2023–24	League Two	26	1	1	0	2	0	4	1	33	2
AFC Wimbledon	AFC Wimbledon Total		113	10	7	0	3	0	8	1	131	5
Cheltenham Town	2024–25	League Two	0	0	0	0	0	0	0	0	0	0
Cheltenham Town	2025–26	League Two	3	0	0	0	0	0	2	0	5	0
Cheltenham Town	Cheltenham Town Total		121	19	7	1	4	1	9	1	141	22
Bath City	2025–26	National League South	2	0	0	0	0	0	0	0	2	0
Career Total			463	56	22	2	14	1	32	5	531	64

114A. The "Other" column constitutes appearances (including substitutions) and goals in the Football League Trophy, FA Trophy, Isthmian League Cup and Sussex Senior Cup.

== Honours ==
Cheltenham Town

- National League: 2015–16

Individual

- National League Team of the Year: 2015–16

Sporting positions
Preceded by Luke Prosser	Colchester United captain 2020–2021	Succeeded by Tommy Smith
