= Sam Clucas =

English footballer (born 1990)

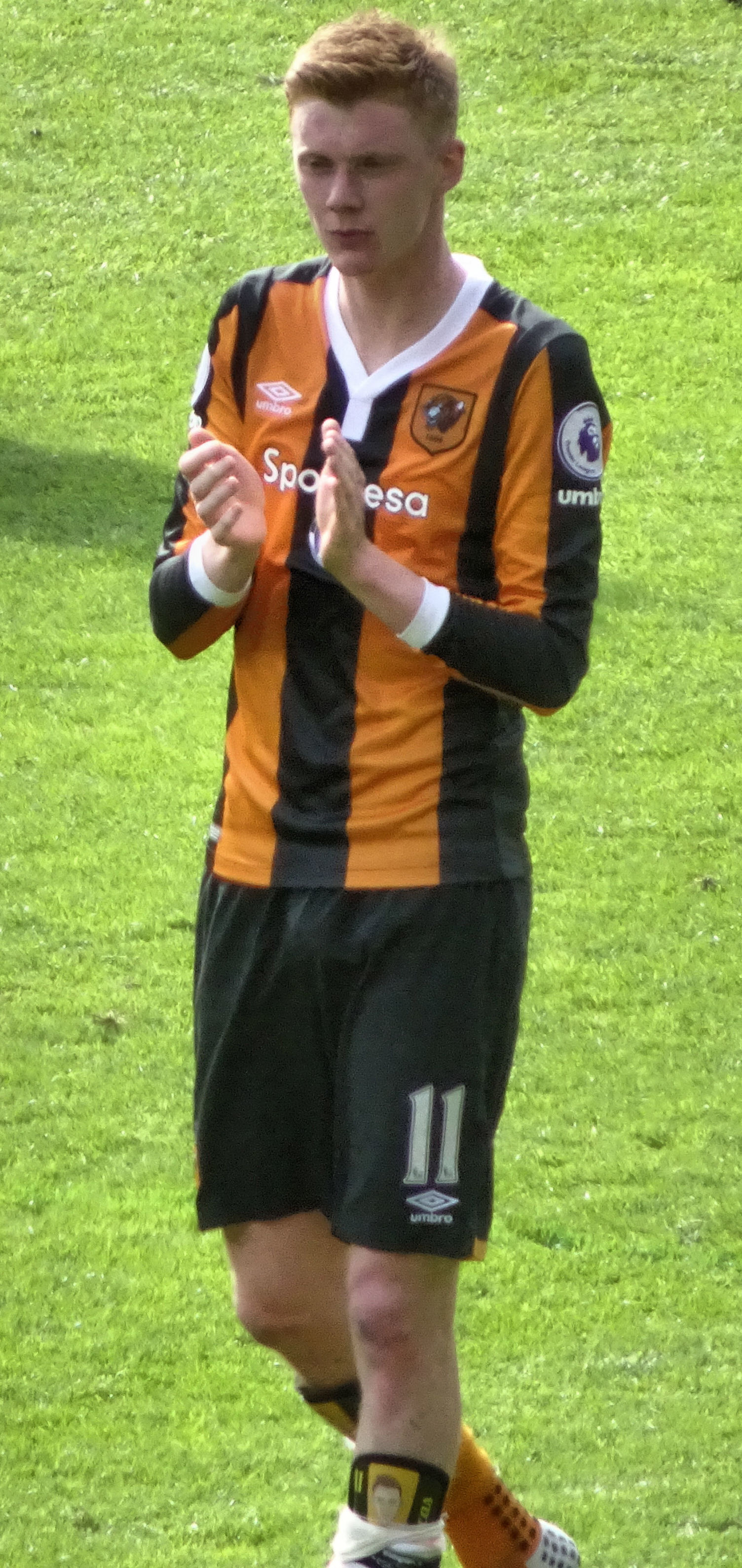
- Clucas playing for Hull City in 2017

Personal information
- Full name: Samuel Raymond Clucas
- Date of birth: 25 September 1990 (age 36)
- Place of birth: Lincoln, England
- Height: 5 ft 10 in (1.78 m)
- Position: Central midfielder

Team information
- Current team: Worthing
- Number: 26

Youth career
- 2001–2008: Leicester City

Senior career*
Years	Team	Apps	(Gls)
2008–2009	Nettleham		
2009–2010	Lincoln City	0	(0)
2010–2011	Jerez Industrial	20	(0)
2011–2013	Hereford United	58	(8)
2013–2014	Mansfield Town	43	(8)
2014–2015	Chesterfield	41	(9)
2015–2017	Hull City	84	(9)
2017–2018	Swansea City	29	(3)
2018–2023	Stoke City	131	(18)
2023–2024	Rotherham United	32	(1)
2024–2025	Oldham Athletic	8	(0)
2025	Lincoln City	8	(1)
2025–2026	Shrewsbury Town	34	(2)
2026–	Worthing	1	(0)

International career
2013	England C	1	(0)
- * Club domestic league appearances and goals as of 17:54, 14 November 2026 (UTC)

Samuel Raymond Clucas (born 25 September 1990) is an English professional footballer who plays as a central midfielder for National League club Worthing.

Clucas started his career as a youth player for Leicester City where he spent six years, before being released. He studied at Lincoln College and had a spell at Nettleham towards the end of the 2008–09 season, before joining his hometown club Lincoln City where he stayed until being released in the summer of 2010. After a short spell in Spain he returned to England and rose from League Two to the Premier League with Hereford United, Mansfield Town, Chesterfield and Hull City; scoring in each division in the process. He joined Swansea City on 23 August 2017, thus ending his stay with Hull City. Clucas spent the 2017–18 season with the Swans before joining Stoke City in August 2018.

== Early and personal life ==
Born in Lincoln, Lincolnshire, Clucas attended Saint Peter and Saint Paul Catholic High School. Prior to signing a professional football contract with Lincoln City, he worked part-time at a café in a Debenhams department store.

== Career ==
=== Early career ===
Clucas started his career with Leicester City, joining their academy at the age of 10, leaving at the age of 16, after being told he was too short. Following his release from Leicester City, he had a short spell playing for Nettleham in the Central Midlands Football League at the end of the 2008–09 season. He then studied sports development qualification at Lincoln College.

=== Lincoln City ===
He was offered a soccer scholarship in the United States, before signing for Lincoln City at the start of the 2009–10 season after a successful trial period with his hometown club, impressing manager Peter Jackson, who described him as a "real find". Whilst on trial with the club he made an appearance in the Lincolnshire Senior Cup final defeat to Scunthorpe United. He made his professional debut on 1 September for Lincoln City in their 1–0 home defeat to Darlington in the Football League Trophy, before being replaced by Chris Fagan in the 63rd minute as a substitute. In late December 2009, manager Chris Sutton announced Clucas would be one of three players to be put on the transfer list. In March 2010, a proposed loan move to Lincoln Moorlands Railway fell through as Northern Counties East League rules prevented member clubs from signing contracted Football League players on short-term loans. Clucas was released by Lincoln City in the summer of 2010.

=== Jerez Industrial ===
In August 2010, having successfully attended trials at Bisham Abbey, he was handed a two-year scholarship at the Glenn Hoddle Academy, the move also enabled him to turn out for Spanish Tercera División (fourth tier) side Jerez Industrial. He made 20 appearances for Jerez before returning to England.

=== Hereford United ===
Clucas signed for Hereford United in November 2011 after a trial period. Clucas made 18 appearances for Hereford in 2011–12 as they suffered relegation to the Conference Premier. Clucas remained with Hereford for the 2012–13 season where he scored nine goals in 47 appearances as the Bulls finished in 7th position.

=== Mansfield Town ===
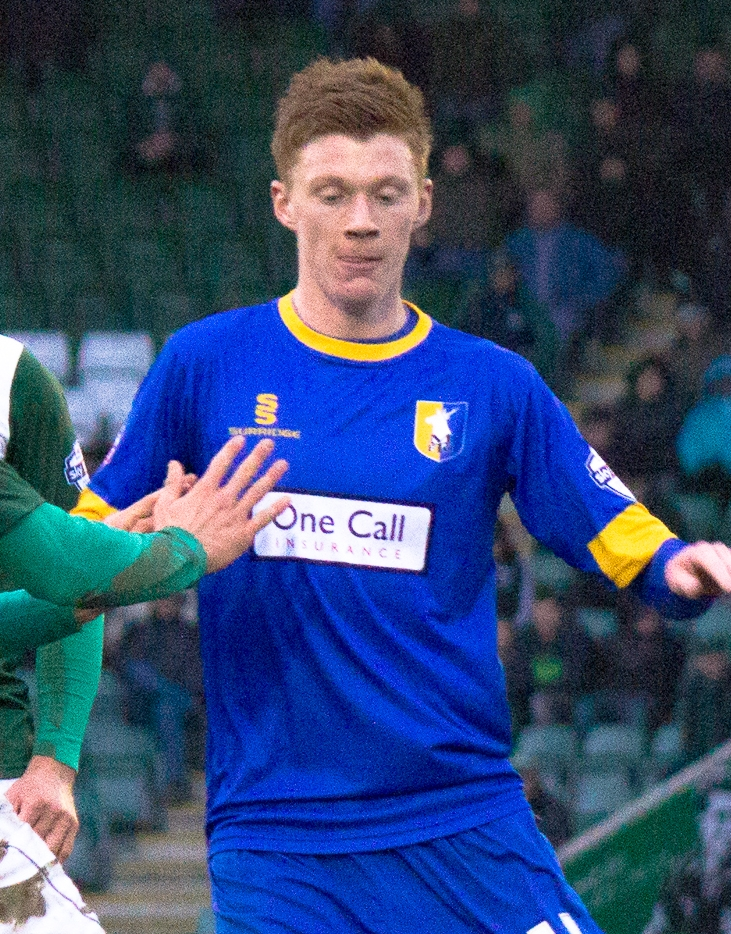
Clucas playing for Mansfield Town in 2014

On 21 June 2013, Clucas signed a two-year contract with Mansfield Town for a fee of £20,000 plus a 15% sell-on clause, which was decided by a tribunal. He had rejected an offer from Crewe Alexandra and chosen to sign for Mansfield as it was closer to his home in Lincoln. Clucas began his Stags career well with a run of five goals in six games and scoring four in an 8–1 win against St. Albans City in the FA Cup. He scored a total of 13 goals in 2013–14 helping Mansfield secure a mid-table position of 11th. Throughout the summer of 2014 Clucas stated his desire to leave Mansfield and play in League One.

=== Chesterfield ===
On 1 September 2014, the 2014 summer transfer window deadline day, League One side Chesterfield signed Clucas on a three-year deal until June 2017 for an undisclosed fee. Under the management of Paul Cook, Clucas played key role in Chesterfield's 2014–15 season, scoring 12 goals in 49 matches as the team reached the League One play-offs, where they lost out to Preston North End.

=== Hull City ===
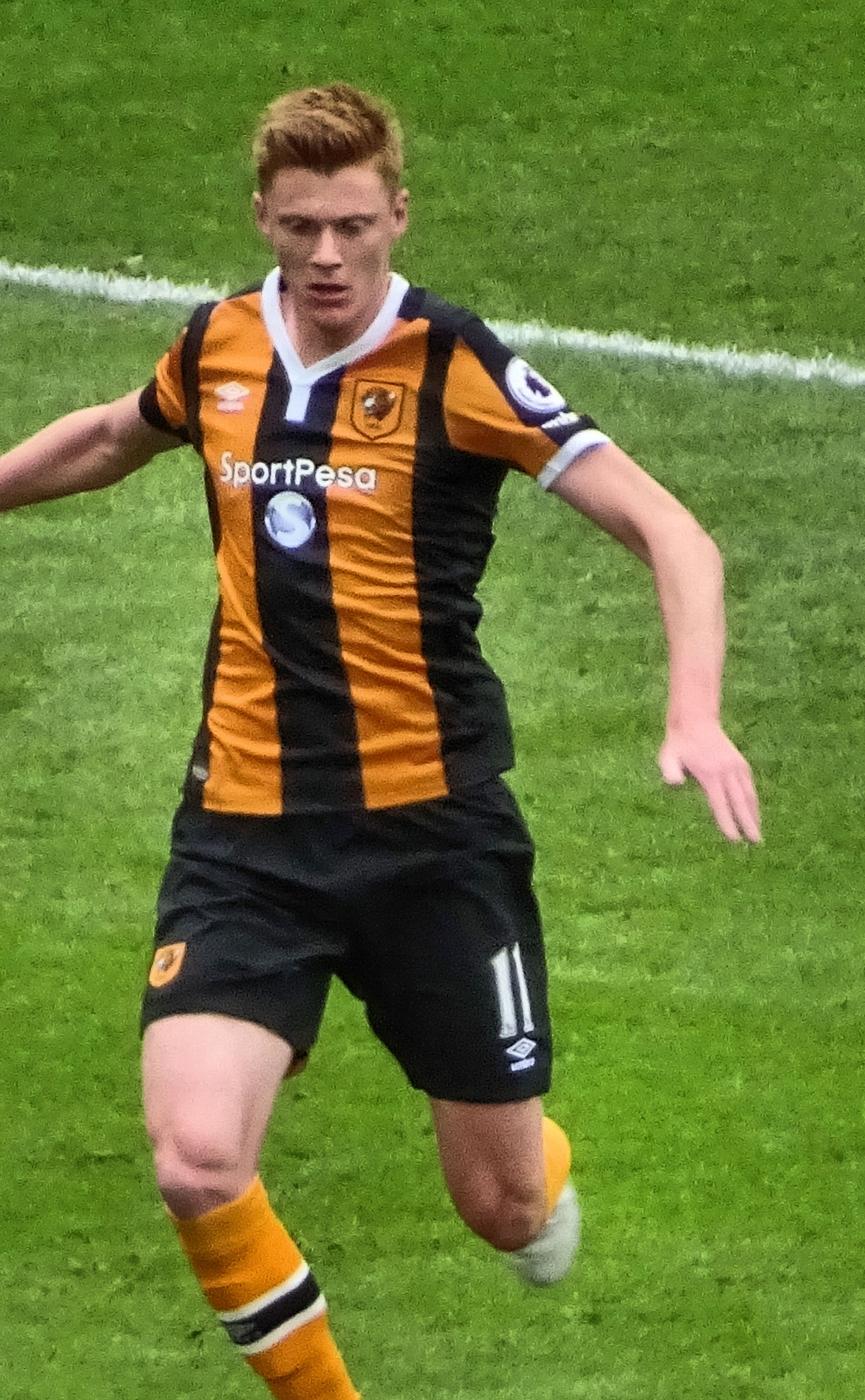
Clucas playing for Hull City in 2016

On 27 July 2015, Clucas signed a three-year deal with Championship side Hull City for an undisclosed fee, thought to be in the region of £1.3 million. Clucas made his competitive debut for Hull against Huddersfield Town on the first day of the 2015–16 season, scoring the first goal of the game. Clucas played 52 times as the Tigers gained an instant return to the Premier League with a 1–0 win against Sheffield Wednesday in the 2016 Football League Championship play-off final.

On 13 August 2016, Clucas made a Premier League debut described as "exceptional" against Leicester City, and four days later Clucas signed a new three-year deal with the club. He scored for Hull in the return game in Leicester in March 2017. It was the fifth successive season in which he scored a goal, in a fifth different division, and in an ascending order — the Football Conference in 2012–13, League Two in 2013–14, League One in 2014–15, Championship in 2015–16, and then the Premier League in 2016–17. Hull were relegated back to the Championship following a 4–0 defeat to Crystal Palace on 14 May 2017.

=== Swansea City ===
On 23 August 2017, Clucas signed a four-year contract with Premier League club Swansea City for an undisclosed fee. Clucas made his Swansea debut in a 2–0 against Crystal Palace on 26 August 2017. He scored three goals for Swansea, all of which came against Arsenal, once in a 2–1 defeat at the Emirates, and twice in a 3–1 win at the Liberty Stadium in late January. Swansea struggled throughout the 2017–18 campaign with Paul Clement unhappy with player recruitment which left his squad imbalanced. Clement was replaced by Carlos Carvalhal in December 2017 and he stated that he was surprised to learn Clucas had struggled for form at the club. Clucas suffered a knee injury towards the end of the season which required surgery. The Swans were relegated to the Championship after a 2–1 defeat to Stoke on the final day.

=== Stoke City ===
Clucas joined Stoke City on 9 August 2018 for a fee of £6 million. Clucas missed the first three months of the 2018–19 campaign due to a slow recovery from knee surgery, eventually making his debut against Nottingham Forest on 10 November 2018. He scored his first goal for Stoke in a 2–1 win over Derby County on 28 November 2018. Clucas played 28 times for Stoke in 2018–19, scoring three goals as Stoke finished in 16th position. Clucas came in for heavy criticism from supporters after a needless red card against Queens Park Rangers on 9 March 2019.

Clucas scored on the opening day of the 2019–20 season in a 2–1 defeat against Queens Park Rangers. Stoke began the season in poor form, failing to win any of the opening ten matches and were rooted to the bottom of the table by October. Michael O'Neill was brought in as new manager in November and Clucas scored twice in his first game in charge in a 4–2 win at Barnsley with his first goal scored from the half-way line. He scored again against Swansea on 25 January 2020 and in response to abuse from the Swansea support he ran the length of the pitch to celebrate in front of them. Clucas scored twice in a 5–1 victory over relegation rivals Hull City on 7 March 2020. The season was then suspended until June due to the COVID-19 pandemic. He scored a vital goal against Birmingham City on 12 July 2020 as Stoke avoided relegation and finished in 15th position. Clucas made 46 appearances in 2019–20 and was top goalscorer with 11. Clucas had injury problems during the 2020–21 campaign, making 26 appearances and underwent surgery on a double hernia in February 2021.

Clucas signed a new two-year contract extension with Stoke in July 2021. Clucas had an inconsistent 2021–22 season, struggling with injuries and form which restricted him to 29 appearances of which 18 were starts. Injuries continued to hamper his game time in 2022–23 and he was released at the end of the season.

=== Rotherham United ===
Clucas joined Rotherham United on 15 September 2023 on a contract until the end of the 2023–24 season. On 7 May 2024, after the club were relegated, Rotherham announced the player would be released in the summer after his contract expired.

=== Oldham Athletic ===
On 31 October 2024, Clucas joined National League club Oldham Athletic. He made his debut for Oldham on 2 November 2024 in a 2–1 win at Tranmere Rovers in the FA Cup in which Clucas grabbed an assist. He only made 8 appearances for the Latics as a clause in his contract, stating that if a League One side offered for him then he would be allowed to leave, was triggered.

=== Return to Lincoln City ===
On 17 January 2025, Clucas rejoined Lincoln City on a deal until the end of the season, with a club option of a further 12 months. He made his first league start away to Leyton Orient on 15 February 2025. His first goal came on 19 February 2025 away in a 3–0 victory at Mansfield Town, which was nominated for the EFL goal of the month. Following the end of the 2024–25 season Clucas was released from Lincoln City, with Clucas saying he wanted to continue his playing career, but the Imps making it clear the door is open for him to start his coaching journey with the club.

=== Shrewsbury Town ===
On 29 May 2025, Clucas signed for Shrewsbury Town, signing a two-year deal. He made his debut on the opening day of the season, starting in the 0–0 draw with Bromley. At the end of the 2025–26 season, he was made available for transfer.

On 22 August 2026, Clucas departed the club by mutual consent.

=== Worthing ===
On 13 November 2026, Clucas joined National League club Worthing on a deal until the end of the 2026–27 season.

== International career ==
Clucas gained his only cap for England C when he played the full 90 minutes in 6–1 win against Bermuda on 6 June 2013.

== Career statistics ==
As of 7 April 2026

Appearances and goals by club, season and competition
Club	Season	League			FA Cup		League Cup		Other		Total	
Club	Season	Division	Apps	Goals	Apps	Goals	Apps	Goals	Apps	Goals	Apps	Goals
Lincoln City	2009–10	League Two	0	0	0	0	0	0	1 (Note: Appearance in Football League Trophy)	0	1	0
Jerez Industrial	2010–11	Tercera División	20	0	—		—		—		20	0
Hereford United	2011–12	League Two	17	0	1	0	0	0	0	0	18	0
Hereford United	2012–13	Conference Premier	41	8	4	1	—		2 (Note: Appearances in FA Trophy)	0	47	9
Hereford United	Total		58	8	5	1	0	0	2	0	65	9
Mansfield Town	2013–14	League Two	38	8	3	5	1	0	1	0	43	13
Mansfield Town	2014–15	League Two	5	0	0	0	1	0	0	0	6	0
Mansfield Town	Total		43	8	3	5	2	0	1	0	49	13
Chesterfield	2014–15	League One	41	9	6	3	0	0	2 (Note: Appearances in League One play-offs)	0	49	12
Hull City	2015–16	Championship	44	6	2	0	3	0	3 (Note: Appearances in Championship play-offs)	0	52	6
Hull City	2016–17	Premier League	37	3	2	0	2	0	—		41	3
Hull City	2017–18	Championship	3	0	0	0	0	0	—		3	0
Hull City	Total		84	9	4	0	5	0	3	0	96	9
Swansea City	2017–18	Premier League	29	3	6	0	1	0	—		36	3
Stoke City	2018–19	Championship	26	3	2	0	0	0	—		28	3
Stoke City	2019–20	Championship	44	11	0	0	2	0	—		46	11
Stoke City	2020–21	Championship	24	2	1	0	1	0	—		26	2
Stoke City	2021–22	Championship	25	2	2	0	2	1	—		29	3
Stoke City	2022–23	Championship	12	0	1	0	1	0	—		14	0
Stoke City	Total		131	18	6	0	6	1	—		143	19
Stoke City U23	2018–19	—	—		—		—		1 (Note: Appearances in EFL Trophy)	0	1	0
Rotherham United	2023–24	Championship	32	1	1	0	0	0	—		33	1
Oldham Athletic	2024–25	National League	7	0	1	0	—		1 (Note: Appearances in National League Cup)	0	9	0
Lincoln City	2024–25	League One	8	1	—		—		—		8	1
Shrewsbury Town	2025–26	League Two	34	2	3	0	1	0	2	0	40	2
Career total			487	59	35	9	15	1	13	0	550	69

== Honours ==
Hull City

- Football League Championship play-offs: 2016
