= Dan Hanford =

Welsh footballer

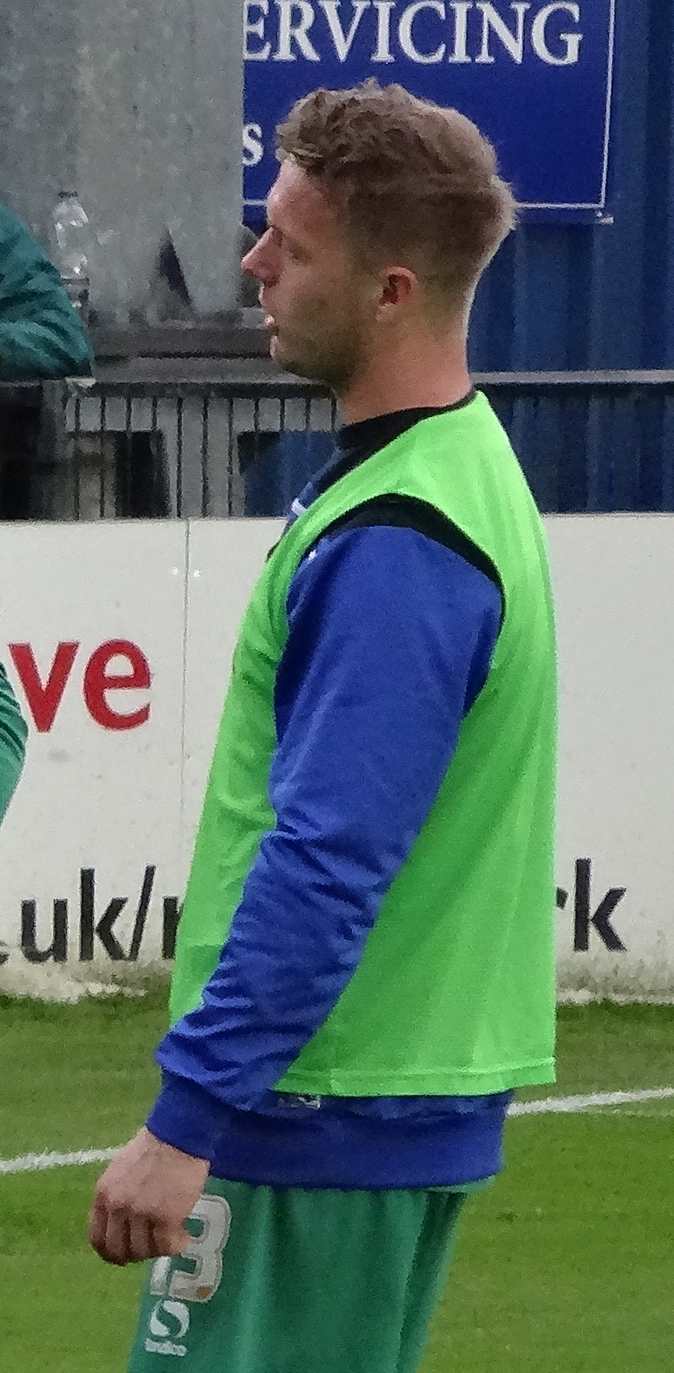
- Dan Hanford in Training

Personal information
- Full name: Daniel James Hanford
- Date of birth: 6 March 1991 (age 35)
- Place of birth: Swansea, Wales
- Height: 6 ft 2 in (1.88 m)
- Position: Goalkeeper

Youth career
- Swansea City
- 2007–2010: Rochdale

Senior career*
Years	Team	Apps	(Gls)
2010–2011	Clitheroe	62	(0)
2011	Jerez	10	(0)
2011–2013	Hereford United	15	(0)
2013–2014	Floriana	78	(0)
2014–2016	Carlisle United	37	(0)
2016–2018	Gateshead	52	(0)
2018–2021	Southport	74	(0)
- * Club domestic league appearances and goals as of 22:50, 2 May 2019 (UTC)

Daniel James Hanford (born 6 March 1991) is a Welsh professional footballer who has played as a goalkeeper for Carlisle United, Floriana, Hereford United, Gateshead, Southport, and Clitheroe.

== Club career ==
=== Early career ===
Born in Swansea, Hanford played in the youth system of Swansea City between the ages of 7 and 16. After spells at Rochdale and Clitheroe, he joined the Glenn Hoddle Academy in Spain. He returned to England in 2011 to play for Hereford United, although his two-year spell there was marred by the club's financial troubles and his own lack of first team opportunities. At the end of the 2012–13 season, he moved to Malta to play for Floriana. After a successful season as a first team regular and winning a cup, he moved to Carlisle United ahead of the 2014–15 season.

=== Carlisle United ===
Hanford joined Carlisle after their relegation to League Two in the 2013–14 season. He was signed on a one-year contract as the understudy to the club's regular goalkeeper Mark Gillespie. He made his debut for Carlisle in September 2014, in a 1–0 win against Tranmere, after Gillespie suffered a groin injury. He made many appearances that season.

In 2015–16, Hanford found his chances limited to a couple of cup appearances only due to Gillespie's good form. In May 2016, he was released.

=== Gateshead ===
After a successful trial in the summer of 2016, Hanford signed a one-year deal with National League side Gateshead.

=== Southport ===
In May 2018 he joined Southport on a free transfer, signing a two-year contract.

=== Back to Carlisle ===
In June 2021, Carlisle based Hanford returned to Carlisle United as a player and goalkeeping coach to help the first team with his experience.

== International career ==
Hanford has represented Wales at the Under-17 and Under-19 levels.

== Career statistics ==
As of match played 21 November 2017

Appearances and goals by club, season and competition
Club	Season	League			National Cup		League Cup		Other		Total	
Club	Season	Division	Apps	Goals	Apps	Goals	Apps	Goals	Apps	Goals	Apps	Goals
Clitheroe	2010–11	NPL - Div 1 North	42	0			—				56	0
Jerez	2011–12	Andalusian Regional Preferente	10	0	—		—		0	0	10	0
Hereford United	2011–12	League Two	0	0	0	0	0	0	0	0	0	0
Hereford United	2012–13	Conference Premier	15	0	0	0	—		1 (Note: Appearances in the FA Trophy)	0	13	0
Hereford United	Total		15	0	0	0	0	0	1	0	13	0
Floriana	2013–14	Maltese Premier League	48	0	1	0	—		0	0	48	0
Carlisle United	2014–15	League Two	25	0	1	0	0	0	1 (Note: Appearances in the Football League Trophy)	0	27	0
Carlisle United	2015–16	League Two	2	0	3	0	0	0	1	0	6	0
Carlisle United	Total		37	0	4	0	0	0	2	0	33	0
Gateshead	2016-17	National League	25	0	2	0	—		2	0	29	0
Gateshead	2017–18	National League	26	0	1	0	—		0	0	13	0
Gateshead	Total		37	0	3	0	0	0	2	0	51	0
Career total			156	0	8	0	0	0	5	0	169	0
