= Benoît Dalibard =

French footballer (born 1991)

Benoit Dalibard
Personal information
- Full name: Benoit Dalibard
- Date of birth: 26 March 1991 (age 35)
- Place of birth: Pencran, France
- Height: 1.88 m (6 ft 2 in)
- Position: Defender

Senior career*
Years	Team	Apps	(Gls)
2007–2011	Guingamp	0	(0)
2011–2012	Hereford United	10	(0)
- * Club domestic league appearances and goals as of 17:05, 12 February 2012 (UTC)

Benoit Dalibard (born 26 March 1991 in Pencran, France) is a French footballer who plays as a defender but is without a club after leaving Hereford United.

== Career ==
Dalibard started his career with En Avant de Guingamp but failed to make a first team appearance for the club. He signed for League Two side Hereford United in August 2011 on a short-term deal but his time at the club was disrupted through injury. He made his professional debut for the club on 20 August 2011, in a 1–1 draw with AFC Wimbledon, being replaced in the first half by Kenny Lunt. In October 2011 he extended his stay at Edgar Street until January 2012 when he then agreed a new eighteen-month contract with the club.

However Dalibard left Hereford United by mutual consent on 4 September 2012 in order to return home to France.
