= Sean Canham =

English footballer

Personal information
- Full name: Sean Thomas Canham
- Date of birth: 26 September 1984 (age 42)
- Place of birth: Exeter, England
- Position: Striker

Team information
- Current team: Sorrento
- Number: 18

Senior career*
Years	Team	Apps	(Gls)
2003–2005	Exeter City	22	(5)
2004–2005	→ Tiverton Town (loan)	4	(0)
2005	→ Moor Green (loan)	11	(0)
2005–2008	Team Bath	120	(72)
2008–2010	Notts County	42	(11)
2010–2012	Hereford United	48	(11)
2011	→ Kidderminster Harriers (loan)	12	(2)
2011–2012	→ Bath City (loan)	24	(9)
2012	→ Bath City (loan)	9	(5)
2013	Hume City	6	(3)
2014–2019	Sorrento	80	(42)
2019-	Gwelup Croatia	9	(2)
- * Club domestic league appearances and goals as of 15 September 2017

Sean Thomas Canham (born 26 September 1984) is an English footballer who plays for Gwelup Croatia.

== Career ==
After an unsuccessful trial with Charlton Athletic, Canham signed for Notts County in early August 2008, for the start of the 2008–09 season. Canham made his debut for Notts County on 9 August 2008, in the 2–1 away defeat to Bradford City. On 1 September 2009, Canham went on loan to Hayes & Yeading United.

After making only one substitute appearance for the Magpies during the 2009/10 season, it was announced that he had been released by Notts County along with 7 other players.

Canham signed for Hereford United in July 2010 on a two-year deal. During the season he joined Kidderminster Harriers on loan in February 2011 for an initial one-month period after finding first team opportunities limited. This was later extended until the end of the season, but he was recalled to Hereford on 27 April 2011. Canham joined Bath City on loan for two months on 30 September 2011. After returning to Hereford for a short spell where he made no appearances Canham re-joined Bath City on loan for the rest of the season in January.

Despite signing a new short-term contract with Hereford and scoring three goals in his four games of the season he was again allowed to join Bath City on loan for three months on 5 October 2012. He was released by Hereford United upon the expiry of his contract on 1 January 2013. He joined Australian side Hume City on 29 January 2013.

He currently plays for Western Australia State League division 1 side Gwelup Croatia. Canham was an influential member of Sorrento's 2015 squad winning the Coolridge cup and helping lead Sorrento into the FFA cup round of 32 where they faced A League side Sydney FC live on Foxtel going down to a respectable 2–0 scoreline.
