= Will Evans (footballer, born 1991) =

English footballer (born 1991)

Personal information
- Full name: William George Evans
- Date of birth: 9 October 1991 (age 35)
- Place of birth: Cricklade, England
- Height: 6 ft 2 in (1.88 m)
- Position: Defender

Team information
- Current team: Scunthorpe United
- Number: 5

Youth career
- Fairford Town
- Cricklade
- –2010: Swindon Town

Senior career*
Years	Team	Apps	(Gls)
2010–2012	Swindon Town	0	(0)
2011	→ Hereford United (loan)	4	(0)
2012–2013	Hereford United	37	(6)
2013	→ Newport County (loan)	6	(0)
2013–2016	Eastleigh	86	(4)
2016–2018	Aldershot Town	72	(7)
2018–2021	Chesterfield	102	(6)
2021–2023	Boreham Wood	74	(2)
2023–	Scunthorpe United	100	(1)
- * Club domestic league appearances and goals as of 12:18, 4 December 2023 (UTC)

William George Evans (born 9 October 1991) is an English professional footballer who plays for National League club Scunthorpe United.

== Career ==
Evans played for Fairford Town and then Cricklade before joining Swindon Town and progressing through their Centre of Excellence. He signed his first professional contract in April 2010, after captaining the youth and reserve sides throughout the 2009–10 season. He made his professional debut in a 3–0 Football League Trophy victory at Southampton on 31 August 2010.

After spending three months on loan with Hereford United where he made 6 appearances he joined Hereford permanently in January 2012 on a free transfer.

On 6 March 2012, Evans scored the fastest goal in Hereford United history in a 2–2 draw at Macclesfield Town. He lashed home a spectacular 25-yarder fractionally inside 12 seconds at Moss Rose before scoring a second goal from outside the penalty area after 26 minutes. The game was Richard O'Kelly's first match in charge of the Bulls having taken over from Jamie Pitman a day earlier. Evans broke the record that had stood since the 1991–92 campaign when Peter Heritage netted after 14 seconds in a home game against Lincoln City.

On 31 January 2013 Evans joined Conference National rivals Newport County on loan until the end of the 2012–13 season. He was eventually released by parent club Hereford at the end of the season and signed for Eastleigh.

On 26 May 2016, Evans signed for Aldershot Town on a one-year deal.

On 29 May 2018, Evans joined National League rivals Chesterfield, on a two-year deal.

On 5 January 2019 Evans scored an injury time equaliser as Chesterfield came back from 3–0 down to draw level at 3–3 with Ebbsfleet United. Evans then had to go in goal for Chesterfield when Callum Burton was sent off in the 95th minute. Evans saved the resultant penalty from Burton's indiscretion, taken by Ebbsfleet striker Michael Cheek, to maintain the draw for his side. Evans was released by Chesterfield at the end of the 2020–21 season.

On 1 July 2021, Evans joined Boreham Wood on a two-year deal.

He agreed to join recently relegated National League North side Scunthorpe United on a one-year contract ahead of the 2023–24 season.

== Career statistics ==
As of match played 2 December 2023

Appearances and goals by club, season and competition
Club	Season	League			FA Cup		League Cup		Other		Total	
Club	Season	Division	Apps	Goals	Apps	Goals	Apps	Goals	Apps	Goals	Apps	Goals
Swindon Town	2010–11	League One	0	0	0	0	0	0	1 (Note: Appearance(s) in Football League Trophy)	0	1	0
Hereford United (loan)	2011–12	League Two	4	0	0	0	0	0	1	0	5	0
Hereford United	2011–12	League Two	21	5	1	0	0	0	0	0	22	5
Hereford United	2012–13	Conference Premier	16	1	4	1	—		1 (Note: Appearance(s) in FA Trophy)	0	21	2
Hereford United	Total		41	6	5	1	0	0	2	0	48	7
Newport County (loan)	2012–13	Conference Premier	6	0	—		—		0	0	6	0
Eastleigh	2013–14	Conference South	18	0	2	0	—		4 (Note: One appearance in Hampshire Senior Cup, three appearances in FA Trophy)	0	24	0
Eastleigh	2014–15	Conference Premier	34	3	3	0	—		4 (Note: One appearance in Hampshire Senior Cup, one appearance in FA Trophy, two appearances in Conference Premier play-offs)	0	41	3
Eastleigh	2015–16	National League	34	1	5	0	—		2 (Note: One appearance and one goal in Hampshire Senior Cup, one appearance in FA Trophy)	1	41	2
Eastleigh	Total		86	4	10	0	—		10	1	106	5
Aldershot Town	2016–17	National League	39	5	0	0	—		4 (Note: Two appearances in FA Trophy, two appearances in National League play-offs)	0	43	5
Aldershot Town	2017–18	National League	33	2	2	0	—		2 (Note: One appearance in FA Trophy, one appearance in National League play-offs)	0	37	2
Aldershot Town	Total		72	7	2	0	—		6	0	80	7
Chesterfield	2018–19	National League	39	5	3	1	—		3	0	45	6
Chesterfield	2019–20	National League	38	0	1	0	—		0	0	39	0
Chesterfield	2020–21	National League	25	1	1	0	—		3 (Note: Two appearances in FA Trophy, one appearance in National League play-offs)	0	29	1
Chesterfield	Total		102	6	5	1	—		6	0	113	7
Boreham Wood	2021–22	National League	41	1	6	1	—		2	0	49	2
Boreham Wood	2022–23	National League	33	1	5	1	—		2 (Note: Appearance(s) in National League play-offs)	0	40	2
Boreham Wood	Total		74	2	11	2	—		4	0	89	4
Scunthorpe United	2023–24	National League North	19	1	2	0	—		1	0	22	1
Career total			400	26	35	4	0	0	30	1	465	31

== Honours ==
Scunthorpe United

- National League North play-offs: 2025
