= Michael Townsend =

English footballer

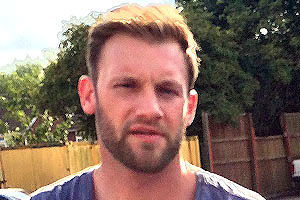
- Townsend in July 2014

Personal information
- Full name: Michael John Townsend
- Date of birth: 17 May 1986 (age 40)
- Place of birth: Walsall, England
- Position: Centre back

Youth career
- 2003–2004: Wolverhampton Wanderers

Senior career*
Years	Team	Apps	(Gls)
2004–2010	Cheltenham Town	134	(7)
2008–2009	→ Barnet (loan)	13	(0)
2010–2013	Hereford United	90	(1)
2014–2015	Tamworth	12	(1)
2015–2016	Rushall Olympic	36	(2)
2016–2017	Sutton Coldfield Town	35	(10)
2017	Stafford Rangers	24	
2017	Barwell	10	(1)
2018	Rushall Olympic	6	(2)
2018	Wolverhampton Sporting	3	(0)
2018	Halesowen Town	2	(0)
2018–2019	Quorn	4	(0)
2019	Nuneaton Borough	7	(2)
2019	Chasetown	1	(0)
2019–2020	Hinckley	1	(0)
2020	Coalville Town	3	(0)
2020	Walsall Wood	1	(0)
2020–2021	Stratford Town	5	(0)
2021–2022	Redditch United	1	(0)
2024–	Sutton Coldfield Town	5	(0)
	Gresley Rovers	1	(0)
- * Club domestic league appearances and goals as of 00:00, 8 August 2021 (UTC)

Michael John Townsend (born 17 May 1986) is an English footballer who most recently played for Sutton Coldfield Town.

== Playing career ==
=== Wolverhampton Wanderers ===
Townsend started his career at Wolverhampton Wanderers as a youth team player where he signed a three-year scholarship. He impressed in the youth teams and was quickly promoted to the reserve side where he established himself as a regular for two seasons. Having not made the breakthrough into the first team Townsend was released by manager Dave Jones at the end of the 2003–04 season.

=== Cheltenham Town ===
Townsend then joined Cheltenham Town on a free transfer in January 2005. He became a regular in the Cheltenham team the following season, he appeared 35 times in his first season in defence.

It was a successful season which saw Cheltenham promoted into League One, Townsend went on to make 70 appearances for Cheltenham at this level scoring twice.

Following a lengthy period of injury Townsend returned to regain his place in the Cheltenham side alongside Shane Duff, and helping Cheltenham to avoid relegation. As of August 2009, Townsend has made 140 appearances for Cheltenham Town.

=== Barnet (loan) ===
He joined Barnet on a months loan in October 2008, the loan was then extended after a few good performances.

Townsend turned down the chance of rejoining Barnet on loan in early 2009 and vowed to fight for a place in the Cheltenham Town team. Shortly afterwards Cheltenham Town manager Martin Allen commented that some players at the club would rather sit on the bench and waste their careers than go out to another club and play football. However, through a mixture of attitude, hard work and determination, he had re-established himself as a key member of the Cheltenham Town defence by September 2009 following several man of the match performances at the end of the 2008–09 and the start of the 2009–10 seasons, including three goals.

He was released by the club along with seven other players in May 2010.

=== Hereford United ===
On 15 July 2010, he signed a two-year deal with Hereford United. On 25 January 2012, Townsend then signed an extension to his contract to keep him at Edgar Street after several strong performances, he scooped the 'Players Player' of the year award and made more appearances than any other player for the second consecutıve year.

Townsend was released by Hereford United at the end of the 2012–13 season after making only seven league appearances due to injury.

=== Tamworth ===
After rehab from injury Townsend joined Conference National side Tamworth on 9 January 2014 as Dale Belford looked to bolster his defensive options. His first game was against Rugby Town in the Birmingham Senior Cup, a match that Tamworth won 1–0.

Townsend went on to make six league appearances for Tamworth during the 2013–14 season, before fracturing a vertebra in the 2–1 defeat at home to Forest Green Rovers on 15 March 2014. This injury ruled him out for the remainder of the season, a season in which Tamworth were relegated to the Conference North.

Townsend was the first player to commit to Tamworth for the 2014–15 Conference North season. Shortly before the start of the Conference North season, manager Dale Belford unveiled Townsend as the club captain.

=== Rushall Olympic ===
Townsend moved to Dales Lane after deciding to leave Tamworth to link up with former coach Richard Sneekes.

Sneekes admitted to admiring Townsend after working closely with him at Hereford United in League 2 and quickly installed him in the middle of his defence and has also used him in a central midfield.

A local lad, Townsend reviled in the press that Rushall was his very first club as a boy and is enjoying his football back at 'home'.

=== Rushall Olympic ===
On 19 January 2018, Rushall Olympic manager Liam McDonald announced the return to Michael Townsend to the club.

=== Chasetown ===
It was announced on 8 August 2019, that Chasetown has signed Michael.

=== Hinckley ===
Townsend signed for Hinckley, and was named in the matchday squad for a Midland League Division One fixture away at Nuneaton Griff on 2 November 2019, a game in which his new side won 2–1.

Michael's stay with the club was a short lived one, as his departure was announced by the club on 6 November 2019, with just the one appearance to his name.

=== Coalville Town ===
On 9 November 2019, Southern League Premier Central side Coalville Town announced the signing Townsend. On the same day the club announced the departure of Charlie Jemson to divisional rivals Peterborough Sports.

=== Stratford Town ===
After a short spell with Walsall Wood, Townsend returned to the Southern League Premier Central on 1 February 2020, when he joined Stratford Town.

=== Redditch United ===
In June 2020, Townsend moved to Redditch United.

== Career statistics ==
As of match played 22 May 2014.

Club	Season	League			FA Cup		League Cup		Other (Note: Includes other competitive competitions, including the FA Trophy)		Total	
Club	Season	Division	Apps	Goals	Apps	Goals	Apps	Goals	Apps	Goals	Apps	Goals
Cheltenham Town	2004–05	League Two	0	0	0	0	0	0	0	0	0	0
Cheltenham Town	2005–06	League Two	31	0	3	0	1	0	2	0	37	0
Cheltenham Town	2006–07	League One	30	1	0	0	0	0	0	0	30	1
Cheltenham Town	2007–08	League One	13	1	0	0	0	0	1	0	14	1
Cheltenham Town	2008–09	League One	26	0	0	0	2	1	0	0	28	1
Barnet (loan)	2008–09	League Two	13	0	2	0	0	0	0	0	15	0
Cheltenham Town	2009–10	League Two	34	3	1	0	1	0	1	0	37	3
Cheltenham Town	Cheltenham Town total		134	6	4	0	4	0	4	0	146	6
Hereford United	2010–11	League Two	43	1	5	0	1	0	1	0	50	1
Hereford United	2011–12	League Two	39	0	1	0	1	0	1	0	42	0
Hereford United	2012–13	Conference National	7	0	0	0	–		0	0	7	0
Hereford United	Hereford United total		89	1	6	0	2	0	2	0	99	1
Tamworth	2013–14	Conference National	6	0	0	0	–		0	0	6	0
Tamworth	2014–15	Conference North	14	0	0	0	–		0	0	0	0
Tamworth	Tamworth total		20	0	0	0	–		0	0	6	0
Career totals			274	7	12	0	6	0	6	0	274	7

== Honours ==
Cheltenham Town

- Football League Two play-off winners: 2005–06
