= Joe Heath =

English footballer (born 1988)

Personal information
- Full name: Joseph Heath
- Date of birth: 4 October 1988 (age 38)
- Place of birth: Birkenhead, England
- Height: 1.80 m (5 ft 11 in)
- Position: Defender

Team information
- Current team: Perth Glory (NPL Head Coach)

Youth career
- Manchester United
- –2005: Nottingham Forest

Senior career*
Years	Team	Apps	(Gls)
2005–2010	Nottingham Forest	10	(0)
2009–2010	→ Lincoln City (loan)	4	(0)
2010–2011	Exeter City	0	(0)
2010–2011	→ Hereford United (loan)	26	(0)
2011–2013	Hereford United	37	(0)
2013–2014	Chester	23	(1)
2014–2015	West Kirby	?	(?)
2016–2017	Runcorn Town	38	(0)
2017–2019	Connah's Quay Nomads	15	(0)
2019–2024	Vauxhall Motors		
- * Club domestic league appearances and goals as of 06:39, 1 May 2018 (UTC)

Joseph Heath (born 4 October 1988) is an English coach and former player who is NPL Head Coach at Perth Glory. A defender, Heath played primarily as a left back.

Despite being a Liverpool fan, Heath was signed by Manchester United as a schoolboy. After being released by United, he signed for Nottingham Forest.

Heath made his full first team debut in August 2008 in a 4–0 League Cup win against Morecambe. He made his Championship debut in a 2–1 defeat to Burnley at the City Ground. In total, Heath made 12 first team appearances during the 2008–2009 season.

On 26 June 2009, Heath signed for Lincoln City on an initial six-month loan deal. However, the need for a hernia operation restricted Heath to just five league and cup appearances for the club before he returned to the City Ground on the completion of his loan. On 19 January 2010 he agreed to leave Forest by mutual consent. On 8 February 2010, along with James Reid, he began a one-week trial with Exeter City. In November 2010 Heath joined Hereford United on-loan initially for a month but this was later extended until the end of the season. He signed a two-year deal to stay at Hereford in June 2011 following his release from Exeter City. In the summer of 2013, Heath joined Chester. He spend the 2014–15 season with West Kirby of the West Cheshire Association Football League, scoring as the club secured the Cheshire FA Amateur Cup with a 4–3 victory over Rudheuth Social on 10 April 2015.

Heath then signed for Runcorn Town.

He later joined Welsh Premier League side Connah's Quay Nomads and signed with the club as a full-time professional.

He then joined Vauxhall Motors, where as well as playing, he was assistant manager gaining two promotions. He also took over as interim manager for a month during the 2023/24 season.

Heath is now NPL Head Coach at Perth Glory in the West of Australia.
