= Stefan Stam =

Dutch footballer

Personal information
- Full name: Stefan Stam
- Date of birth: 14 September 1979 (age 47)
- Place of birth: Amersfoort, Netherlands
- Height: 6 ft 2 in (1.88 m)
- Position: Centre back

Youth career
- 1997–2000: AZ
- 2000–2001: PSV

Senior career*
Years	Team	Apps	(Gls)
2001–2003	Eindhoven	42	(3)
2003–2004	SV Huizen	23	(4)
2004	AFC	16	(2)
2004–2009	Oldham Athletic	97	(1)
2009–2011	Yeovil Town	21	(1)
2011	→ Hereford United (loan)	10	(0)
2011–2013	Hereford United	61	(3)
2013–2014	FC Den Bosch	12	(0)
2014–2017	Katwijk	48	(5)
Total		330	(19)
- * Club domestic league appearances and goals

Stefan Stam (born 14 September 1979) is a former Dutch footballer who played as a centre back. His previous clubs include AZ, PSV, Eindhoven, AFC, Oldham Athletic, Yeovil Town, Hereford United, FC Den Bosch and Katwijk.

== Life and career ==
Stam was born in Amersfoort. He played for VV Grasshoppers of Hoogwoud before playing for the youth teams of both AZ and PSV. He made his professional debut for Eindhoven and spent two seasons playing for the club in the Eerste Divisie. He moved to England in 2003, signing for Oldham Athletic after a successful trial. He scored one goal in 97 league appearances for Oldham, in a 2–1 win against Rotherham United in September 2006. He was released by Oldham in May 2009, and went on to sign a two-year contract with Yeovil Town the following month. Stam scored his only goal for the club in a 2–1 win against Exeter City in January 2010. Nine months later, he was made available for loan.

He joined Hereford United on loan for a month in March 2011, which was later extended until the end of the season. Following his release by Yeovil, Stam signed a two-year contract with Hereford in July.
