= David Keyte =

English football businessman (1954–2022)

David Keyte (1954 – 5 April 2022) was an English businessman and football chairman.

Keyte went to Hereford Cathedral School and played for Hereford United Reserves in the 1970s, having been signed by Colin Addison. He also played football for Westfields. He was also a cricketer, playing as a wicket-keeper for Worcestershire 2nd XI. Keyte trained as an accountant.

In 2000, he was appointed Bursar at Bredon School, an independent school near Tewkesbury. Quickly promoted to General Manager, he bought the school in 2002 and became Principal. In 2009, he sold the school whilst remaining as Principal before retiring from his position in the summer of 2010.

Keyte became chairman of Hereford United on 4 June 2010. He was introduced to his vice chairman Tim Russon by Joan Fennessy, the outgoing company secretary, two months previously.

At the end of the 2011–12 season Hereford United were relegated from the football league and began the 2012–13 season in the Conference Premier. The club finished a creditable sixth place in its first season back in non-league football but struggled financially and players were left unpaid at the end of the season, with Keyte explaining that players were informed that they wouldn't be paid by text message.

As the 2013–14 season began the club continued to struggle on the pitch and were left battling a second relegation in three seasons, only securing their place in the Conference on the final day of the season with a victory over Aldershot Town. The club also struggled once again off the field during the 2013–14 season and players were routinely denied payment despite constant reassurances from Keyte and the Hereford United board. Despite a huge fundraising effort from fans which raised tens of thousands of pounds to pay an overdue tax bill, players were once again left without wages at the end of the season.

In June 2014 David Keyte sold Hereford United to Tommy Agombar, a London-based businessman, reportedly for £1, despite receiving an offer for the club from the Hereford United Supporters Trust. The new owners of the club declined to pay a financial bond to the Football Conference, resulting in the club's expulsion from the league.

Shortly afterwards the Hereford United players released a statement regarding the non-payment of wages during the 2013–14 season, claiming that Keyte and the board of directors "are to blame for the 90-year old club's expulsion from the Conference". The statement continued: "Every week, David Keyte assured senior professionals he would meet the outstanding wages in full. On survival, David Keyte promised to email players every week to keep them informed of what monies were available to pay players. Instead he has ignored players calls and asked who they were when answering some players after apparently losing phone numbers."

In December 2014 Hereford United were wound up in the High Court and the club's Southern League record was expunged.

Early in 2015 Keyte was spotted at Edgar Street with Chris Swan, the chairman of Redditch United. It later transpired that Redditch United had made a move to play football at Hereford United's former ground.
