= Lincoln City F.C. Player of the Year =

English football club award

The Lincoln City F.C. Player of the Year is an annual award presented to players of Lincoln City on behalf of the club's fans to recognise an outstanding contribution to the previous season. The award was first presented in 1970 following the 1969–70 season.

== Appearances ==
Appearances and goals are listed for the season for which the player won the award. Only competitive fixtures are included in the statistics. These include:

- Premier League and English Football League (including play-off matches in the latter)
- Official European competitions – UEFA Cup, Intertoto Cup, Inter-Cities Fairs Cup, Anglo-Italian Cup
- Official domestic competitions – FA Cup, EFL Cup, EFL Trophy, Full Members' Cup
- Friendly matches, exhibition games, and pre-season tournaments are excluded from the figures.

=== Table headers ===
- Season – Seasons are scheduled to run from August until May of the following year, with the award usually being presented in April or May for the preceding season.
- Level – The league and level at which the season was played. Division One was the highest level in English football until the formation of the Premier League in 1992–93, after which Division One became the second tier. In 2004–05 the Championship was formed as the new second tier with League One and League Two making up the remainder of the English Football League.
- Nationality – The player's officially recognised FIFA nationality. A player may have been born in one country but represented another nation through family ancestry.
- Apps – The number of games played in the season including any substitute appearances.
- Goals – The number of goals scored in the season.
- Notes – Further information on the award.

== Winners ==
Season	Level	Name	Position	Nationality	Apps	Gls	Notes	Refs
1969–70	Fourth Division	John Kennedy	Goalkeeper	Northern Ireland			Inaugural winner. First goalkeeper to win. First Northern Irish player to win.	
1970–71	Fourth Division	Phil Hubbard	Midfielder	England			First midfielder to win. First English player to win.	
1971–72	Fourth Division	Terry Branston	Defender	England			First defender to win.	
1972–73	Fourth Division	George Peden	Defender	Scotland			First Scottish player to win.	
1973–74	Fourth Division	Not awarded						
1974–75	Fourth Division	Terry Cooper	Defender	Wales			First Welsh player to win.	
1975–76	Fourth Division	Sam Ellis	Defender	England				
1976–77	Third Division	Sam Ellis	Defender	England			First player to win the award twice.	
1977–78	Third Division	Peter Grotier	Goalkeeper	England				
1978–79	Third Division	Terry Cooper	Defender	Wales				
1979–80	Fourth Division	Trevor Peake	Defender	England				
1980–81	Fourth Division	Trevor Peake	Defender	England				
1981–82	Third Division	Steve Thompson	Defender	England				
1982–83	Third Division	Glenn Cockerill	Midfielder	England				
1983–84	Third Division	David Felgate	Goalkeeper	Wales				
1984–85	Third Division	Gordon Hobson	Forward	England			First forward to win.	
1985–86	Third Division	Gary Strodder	Defender	England				
1986–87	Fourth Division	Gary West	Defender	England	52	2		
1987–88	Conference Premier	Bobby Cumming	Defender	Scotland				
1988–89	Fourth Division	Tony James	Defender	England				
1989–90	Fourth Division	Mark Wallington	Goalkeeper	England				
1990–91	Fourth Division	Graham Bressington	Midfielder	England				
1991–92	Fourth Division	Matt Carmichael	Forward	England				
1992–93	Third Division	Dave Puttnam	Midfielder	England				
1993–94	Third Division	John Schofield	Midfielder	England	50	2		
1994–95	Third Division	Andy Leaning	Goalkeeper	England	30	0		
1995–96	Third Division	Gareth Ainsworth	Midfielder	England	35	13		
1996–97	Third Division	Gareth Ainsworth	Midfielder	England	54	24		
1997–98	Third Division	Kevin Austin	Defender	England	52	0		
1998–99	Second Division	Steve Holmes	Defender	England	42	8		
1999–00	Third Division	Lee Thorpe	Forward	England	47	16		
2000–01	Third Division	Justin Walker	Midfielder	England	53	2		
2001–02	Third Division	Grant Brown	Defender	England	40	0		
2002–03	Third Division	Paul Morgan	Defender	Northern Ireland	52	0		
2003–04	Third Division	Gary Taylor-Fletcher	Forward	England	48	19		
2004–05	League Two	Simon Yeo	Forward	England	51	23		
2005–06	League Two	Jamie McCombe	Defender	England	42	4		
2006–07	League Two	Lee Beevers	Defender	Wales	49	6		
2007–08	League Two	Paul Green	Midfielder	England	40	1		
2008–09	League Two	Scott Kerr	Midfielder	England	49	2		
2009–10	League Two	Rob Burch	Goalkeeper	England	51	0		
2010–11	League Two	Ashley Grimes	Midfielder	England	30	17		
2011–12	Conference Premier	Joe Anyon	Goalkeeper	England	42	0		
2012–13	Conference Premier	Alan Power	Midfielder	Republic of Ireland	43	12	First Irish player to win.	
2013–14	Conference Premier	Tom Miller	Defender	England	45	5		
2014–15	Conference Premier	Paul Farman	Goalkeeper	England	32	0		
2015–16	National League	Bradley Wood	Defender	England	44	1		
2016–17	National League	Alex Woodyard	Midfielder	England	57	1		
2017–18	League Two	Neal Eardley	Defender	Wales	54	1		
2018–19	League Two	Michael Bostwick	Defender	England	49	3		
2019–20	League One	Not awarded						
2020–21	League One	Jorge Grant	Midfielder	England	51	17		
2021–22	League One	Regan Poole	Defender	Wales	50	1		
2022–23	League One	Paudie O'Connor	Defender	Republic of Ireland	53	2		
2023–24	League One	Lukas Jensen	Goalkeeper	Denmark	50	0	First Danish player to win.	
2024–25	League One	Tendayi Darikwa	Defender	Zimbabwe	50	5	First Zimbabwean player to win.	
2025–26	League One	Sonny Bradley	Defender	England	51	4		

=== Wins by player ===
Players who have won the award more than once.

Winner	Total wins	Year(s)
(England) Sam Ellis	2	1975–76, 1976–77
(Wales) Terry Cooper	2	1974–75, 1978–79
(England) Trevor Peake	2	1979–80, 1980–81
(England) Gareth Ainsworth	2	1995–96, 1996–97

=== Wins by playing position ===
Position	Number of winners
Goalkeeper	9
Defender	27
Midfielder	14
Forward	5

=== Wins by nationality ===
Nationality	Number of winners
England	41
Wales	6
Republic of Ireland	2
Northern Ireland	2
Scotland	2
Denmark	1
Zimbabwe	1
