= 2009–10 Lincoln City F.C. season =

Lincoln City
2009–10 season
- Manager: Peter Jackson (until 2 September); Simon Clark (caretaker, 2 – 28 September); Chris Sutton (from 28 September)
- Stadium: Sincil Bank
- Football League Two: 20th
- FA Cup: Third round
- League Cup: First round
- League Trophy: First round
Home colours	Away colours	Third colours

The 2009–10 season saw Lincoln City compete in Football League Two where they finished in 20th position with 50 points.

Lincoln started the season under manager Peter Jackson, but he was sacked on 2 September 2009, and first-team coach Simon Clark took temporary charge. Chris Sutton was appointed as manager in his place on 28 September.

== Final league table ==
Pos	Team	Pld	W	D	L	GF	GA	GD	Pts
18	Crewe Alexandra	46	15	10	21	68	73	−5	55
19	Macclesfield Town	46	12	18	16	49	58	−9	54
20	Lincoln City	46	13	11	22	42	65	−23	50
21	Barnet	46	12	12	22	47	63	−16	48
22	Cheltenham Town	46	10	18	18	54	71	−17	48

Updated to match(es) played on unknown. Source: football-league.co.uk

== Results ==
Lincoln City's score comes first

=== Legend ===
Win	Draw	Loss

=== Football League Two ===
Match	Date	Opponent	Venue	Result	Attendance	Scorers
1	8 August 2009	Barnet	H	1–0	3,753	Kovács
2	15 August 2009	Accrington Stanley	A	0–1	1,498	
3	18 August 2009	Bradford City	A	2–0	11,242	Howe, Fagan
4	22 August 2009	Burton Albion	H	0–2	3,590	
5	29 August 2009	Dagenham & Redbridge	A	0–3	1,810	
6	5 September 2009	Darlington	H	3–0	3,005	Howe (2), Fagan
7	12 September 2009	AFC Bournemouth	A	1–3	3,785	Fagan
8	19 September 2009	Shrewsbury Town	H	0–2	3,234	
9	26 September 2009	Bury	A	0–2	2,554	
10	29 September 2009	Notts County	H	0–3	5,527	
11	3 October 2009	Aldershot Town	H	1–0	4,131	Torres
12	10 October 2009	Macclesfield Town	A	1–0	2,006	Howe
13	17 October 2009	Northampton Town	A	0–1	4,341	
14	24 October 2009	Torquay United	H	0–0	3,604	
15	31 October 2009	Morecambe	A	1–3	1,701	Howe
16	14 November 2009	Cheltenham Town	H	1–1	3,008	Clarke
17	21 November 2009	Grimsby Town	H	0–0	4,981	
18	24 November 2009	Rotherham United	A	0–2	2,901	
19	1 December 2009	Port Vale	H	1–2	2,569	Martin (o.g.)
20	5 December 2009	Crewe Alexandra	A	0–0	3,623	
21	12 December 2009	Rochdale	H	1–3	3,293	Herd
22	26 December 2009	Chesterfield	H	2–1	4,604	Hughton, Facey
23	16 January 2010	Barnet	A	2–1	1,810	Hughton, John-Lewis
24	23 January 2010	Bradford City	H	2–1	3,803	Herd, Gilmour
25	27 January 2010	Burton Albion	A	0–1	2,109	
26	2 February 2010	Hereford United	A	0–2	1,429	
27	6 February 2010	Chesterfield	A	1–2	3,573	Swaibu
28	9 February 2010	Darlington	A	1–1	1,697	Hone
29	13 February 2010	Rotherham United	H	1–2	4,152	Lennon
30	16 February 2010	Accrington Stanley	H	2–1	2,779	Lennon, Kempson (o.g.)
31	20 February 2010	Grimsby Town	A	2–2	6,395	Herd, Gilmour
32	23 February 2010	Port Vale	A	0–4	3,231	
33	27 February 2010	Crewe Alexandra	H	1–1	3,110	Somma
34	6 March 2010	Rochdale	A	1–1	3,453	Herd
35	12 March 2010	Hereford United	H	3–1	6,012	Somma, Saunders (2)
36	16 March 2010	Dagenham & Redbridge	H	1–1	2,457	Somma
37	20 March 2010	Torquay United	A	3–2	2,547	Somma (2), Hughton
38	27 March 2010	Northampton Town	H	1–1	3,964	Saunders
39	3 April 2010	Cheltenham Town	A	0–1	3,708	
40	5 April 2010	Morecambe	H	1–3	3,109	Hughton
41	10 April 2010	AFC Bournemouth	H	2–1	3,040	Somma (2)
42	13 April 2010	Notts County	A	1–3	7,501	Lennon
43	17 April 2010	Shrewsbury Town	A	0–1	4,932	
44	24 April 2010	Bury	H	1–0	3,403	Somma
45	1 May 2010	Aldershot Town	A	1–3	4,506	Somma
46	8 May 2010	Macclesfield Town	H	0–0	3,291	

=== FA Cup ===
Match	Date	Opponent	Venue	Result	Attendance	Scorers
R1	7 November 2009	AFC Telford United	A	3–1	2,809	Torres, Clarke, Brown
R2	28 November 2009	Northwich Victoria	A	3–1	3,000	Fagan, Clarke (2)
R3	2 January 2010	Bolton Wanderers	A	0–4	11,193	

=== Football League Cup ===
Match	Date	Opponent	Venue	Result	Attendance	Scorers
R1	11 August 2009	Barnsley	H	0–1	3,653	

=== Football League Trophy ===
Match	Date	Opponent	Venue	Result	Attendance	Scorers
R1	1 September 2009	Darlington	A	0–1	828	

== Squad statistics ==
No.	Pos.	Name	League		FA Cup		League Cup		Other		Total	
No.	Pos.	Name	Apps	Goals	Apps	Goals	Apps	Goals	Apps	Goals	Apps	Goals
1	GK	(England) Rob Burch	46	0	3	0	1	0	1	0	51	0
2	DF	(England) Paul Green	13(2)	0	1	0	0	0	0	0	14(2)	0
3	DF	(England) Aaron Brown	12	0	0	0	1	0	1	0	14	0
4	DF	(Hungary) János Kovács	14	1	2	0	1	0	0	0	17	1
5	DF	(England) Moses Swaibu	29(5)	1	2	0	1	0	1	0	32(5)	1
6	DF	(England) Danny Hone	16(1)	1	0	0	0	0	1	0	17(1)	1
7	MF	(England) Stefan Oakes	11(5)	0	0	1	0	0	0	0	12(5)	0
8	MF	(England) Richard Butcher	10(5)	0	0	1	0	0	0	0	11(5)	0
9	FW	(England) Paul Connor	8(7)	0	0	0	1	0	1	0	10(7)	0
10	FW	(Republic of Ireland) Chris Fagan	10(3)	3	2	1	0(1)	0	0(1)	0	12(5)	3
11	MF	(England) Scott Kerr	36(3)	0	2	0	0	0	1	0	39(3)	0
13	DF	(England) Ian Pearce	5(5)	0	0(1)	0	0	0	0	0	5(6)	0
14	FW	(England) Lenell John-Lewis	7(17)	1	1(1)	0	0	0	0(1)	0	8(19)	1
15	DF	(Wales) David Stephens	3	0	0	0	0	0	0	0	3	0
15	FW	(England) Jamie Clarke	14(6)	1	2	3	1	0	0	0	17(6)	4
15	FW	(England) Drewe Broughton	7	0	0	0	0	0	0	0	7	0
16	FW	(Scotland) Steven Lennon	15(4)	3	0	0	0	0	0	0	15(4)	3
16	DF	(England) Joe Heath	3(1)	0	1	0	0	0	0	0	4(1)	0
17	MF	(England) Sam Clucas	0	0	0	0	0	0	1	0	1	0
18	FW	(South Africa) Davide Somma	14	9	0	0	0	0	0	0	14	9
18	FW	(England) Rene Howe	14(3)	5	1(1)	0	1	0	1	0	17(4)	5
19	MF	(England) Shane Clarke	21(8)	0	2	0	1	0	1	0	25(8)	0
20	GK	(England) Paul Musselwhite	0	0	0	0	0	0	0	0	0	0
21	MF	(England) James Reid	0	0	0	0	0	0	0	0	0	0
21	MF	(Argentina) Sergio Torres	7(1)	1	1	1	0	0	0	0	8(1)	2
22	DF	(England) Adam Watts	18	0	2	0	0	0	0	0	20	0
23	MF	(England) Clark Keltie	9(2)	0	0	0	0	0	0	0	9(2)	0
23	MF	(Wales) Anthony Pulis	7	0	1	0	0	0	0	0	8	0
24	DF	(England) Nathan Adams	0(2)	0	0	0	0	0	0	0	0(2)	0
25	MF	(Republic of Ireland) Cian Hughton	41	4	3	0	1	0	1	0	46	4
26	FW	(England) Andy Hutchinson	0(10)	0	0	0	0	0	1	0	1(10)	0
27	FW	(Bermuda) Khano Smith	4(1)	0	1	0	0	0	0	0	5(1)	0
28	DF	(United States) Eric Lichaj	6	0	0	0	0	0	0	0	6	0
29	DF	(England) Kern Miller	0	0	0	0	0	0	0	0	0	0
30	DF	(England) Luca Coleman-Carr	0(1)	0	0	0	0	0	0	0	0(1)	0
31	DF	(England) Michael Gordon	4(1)	0	0	0	0	0	0	0	4(1)	0
32	MF	(England) Lee Bennett	0(1)	0	0	0	0	0	0	0	0(1)	0
33	DF	(England) Nathan Baker	17(1)	0	0	0	0	0	0	0	17(1)	0
34	MF	(Australia) Chris Herd	20	4	2	0	0	0	0	0	22	4
35	MF	(Scotland) Brian Gilmour	14(2)	2	1(1)	0	0	0	0	0	15(3)	2
36	FW	(Grenada) Delroy Facey	9(1)	1	0	0	0	0	0	0	9(1)	1
37	FW	(England) Michael Uwezu	0(2)	0	0(1)	0	0	0	0	0	0(3)	0
38	DF	(England) Joe Anderson	23	0	1	0	0	0	0	0	24	0
39	MF	(England) Matthew Saunders	17(1)	3	1	0	0	0	0	0	18(1)	3
