= 2008–09 Lincoln City F.C. season =

Lincoln City
2008–09 season
- Manager: Peter Jackson
- Stadium: Sincil Bank
- League Two: 13th
- FA Cup: First round
- Football League Cup: First round
- Johnstones Paint Trophy: Second round

This page shows the progress of Lincoln City F.C. in the 2008–09 football season. During the season, Lincoln competed in League Two in the English league system.

== League table ==
Pos	Team	Pld	W	D	L	GF	GA	GD	Pts
11	Morecambe	46	15	18	13	53	56	−3	63
12	Darlington	46	20	12	14	61	44	+17	62 (Note: Darlington deducted 10 points for entering administration.)
13	Lincoln City	46	14	17	15	53	52	+1	59
14	Rotherham United	46	21	12	13	60	46	+14	58 (Note: Rotherham United deducted 17 points for leaving administration without a Company Voluntary Agreement.)
15	Aldershot Town	46	14	12	20	59	80	−21	54

Source: The Football League
Rules for classification: 1) points; 2) goal difference; 3) number of goals scored.

== Results ==
=== Football League Two ===
9 August 2008 1	Rotherham United	1–0	Lincoln City	Sheffield
	Reid 44'			Stadium: Don Valley Stadium; Attendance: 4,748

16 August 2008 2	Lincoln City	1–3	Dagenham & Redbridge	Lincoln
	John-Lewis 18'		Strevens 67', 79'; Benson 90'	Stadium: Sincil Bank; Attendance: 3,581

23 August 2008 3	Wycombe Wanderers	1–0	Lincoln City	Wycombe
	Woodman 15'			Stadium: Adams Park; Attendance: 4,112

30 August 2008 4	Lincoln City	1–1	Grimsby Town	Lincoln
	Frecklington 73' (pen.)		Till 38'	Stadium: Sincil Bank; Attendance: 4,573

6 September 2008 5	Lincoln City	2–0	Barnet	Lincoln
	N'Guessan 74'; Pătulea 87'			Stadium: Sincil Bank; Attendance: 3,417

13 September 2008 6	Bury	3–1	Lincoln City	Bury
	Morrell 30'; Sodje 50'; Bishop 66'		Buchanan 37'	Stadium: Gigg Lane; Attendance: 2,663

20 September 2008 7	Brentford	1–1	Lincoln City	London
	Elder 34'		Pătulea 30'	Stadium: Griffin Park; Attendance: 4,557

27 September 2008 8	Lincoln City	1–1	Morecambe	Lincoln
	Frecklington 20'		Stanley 45'	Stadium: Sincil Bank; Attendance: 5,003

4 October 2008 9	Chester City	0–2	Lincoln City	Chester
	Kovacs 45'; Pătulea 57'			Stadium: Deva Stadium; Attendance: 1,962

10 October 2008 10	Lincoln City	1–1	Rochdale	Lincoln
	Hone 86'		Rundle 26'	Stadium: Sincil Bank; Attendance: 4,510

18 October 2008 11	Lincoln City	3–1	Chesterfield	Lincoln
	Oakes 17'; Pătulea 30'; Hone (red card) 47'; Kovács 56'		Lester 73'	Stadium: Sincil Bank; Attendance: 4,326

21 October 2008 12	Macclesfield Town	1–2	Lincoln City	Macclesfield
	Yeo 5'		Beevers 45'; Frecklington 82'	Stadium: Moss Rose; Attendance: 1,247

25 October 2008 13	Bournemouth	0–1	Lincoln City	Bournemouth
			John-Lewis 24'	Stadium: Fitness First Stadium; Attendance: 4,464

28 October 2008 14	Lincoln City	2–0	Gillingham	Lincoln
	Frecklington 12'; N'Guessan 14'			Stadium: Sincil Bank; Attendance: 4,396

1 November 2008 15	Lincoln City	0–1	Port Vale	Lincoln
			Howland 26'	Stadium: Sincil Bank; Attendance: 4,793

15 November 2008 16	Darlington	2–0	Lincoln City	Darlington
	Foster (red card) 14'; Hatch 47'; Foran 90'			Stadium: The Darlington Arena; Attendance: 3,534

22 November 2008 17	Lincoln City	0–0	Shrewsbury Town	Lincoln
			Walker (red card) 3'	Stadium: Sincil Bank; Attendance: 3,517

25 November 2008 18	Aldershot Town	2–0	Lincoln City	Aldershot
	Sandell 36'; Davies 60'			Stadium: EBB Stadium; Attendance: 2,625

6 December 2008 19	Exeter City	2–1	Lincoln City	Exeter
	McAllister 75'; Moxey 90'		John-Lewis 51'; N'Guessan (red card) 88'	Stadium: St James Park; Attendance: 3,916

12 December 2008 20	Lincoln City	5–1	Accrington Stanley	Lincoln
	Pătulea 68', 90'; Brown 77'; Wright 83'; Frecklington 90' (pen.)		Miles 11'	Stadium: Sincil Bank; Attendance: 2,625

20 December 2008 21	Notts County	0–1	Lincoln City	Nottingham
			Pătulea 32'	Stadium: Meadow Lane; Attendance: 4,568

26 December 2008 22	Lincoln City	0–0	Bradford City	Lincoln
				Stadium: Sincil Bank; Attendance: 6,156

28 December 2008 23	Luton Town	3–2	Lincoln City	Luton
	Martin 31', 33'; Roper 50'		John-Lewis 38'; Pătulea 90'	Stadium: Kenilworth Road; Attendance: 6,643

10 January 2009 24	Lincoln City	2–2	Brentford	Lincoln
	N'Guessan 6'; Elding 66'		Bean; Bowditch 23'	Stadium: Sincil Bank; Attendance: 3,932

17 January 2009 25	Rochdale	2–2	Lincoln City	Rochdale
	Le Fondre 23'; McEvilly 84'		Kennedy 48' (o.g.)N'Guessan 62'	Stadium: Spotland; Attendance: 2,897

24 January 2009 26	Lincoln City	1–1	Chester City	Lincoln
	Frecklington 48'		Barry 31'	Stadium: Sincil Bank; Attendance: 3,760

27 January 2009 27	Gillingham	1–2	Lincoln City	Gillingham
	Jackson 25' (pen.)		Horsfield 52'N'Guessan 90'	Stadium: Priestfield; Attendance: 4,525

31 January 2009 28	Lincoln City	3–3	Bournemouth	Lincoln
	N'Guessan 19'; Beevers 86'; Frecklington 90'		Molesley 36'; Pitman 65' (pen.), 77' (pen.)	Stadium: Sincil Bank; Attendance: 3,634

10 February 2009 29	Morecambe	1–1	Lincoln City	Morecambe
	Bentley 19'		Green 83'	Stadium: Christie Park; Attendance: 1,471

20 February 2009 30	Port Vale	0–1	Lincoln City	Stoke on Trent
			N'Guessan 12'	Stadium: Vale Park; Attendance: 5,097

28 February 2009 31	Lincoln City	0–1	Rotherham United	Lincoln
			Cummins 65'	Stadium: Sincil Bank; Attendance: 4,336

3 March 2009 32	Dagenham & Redbridge	0–3	Lincoln City	London
			Brown 44'; Elding 84'; Kovács 87'	Stadium: Victoria Road; Attendance: 1,302

7 March 2009 33	Grimsby Town	5–1	Lincoln City	Grimsby
	Proudlock 42', 84'; Akpa Akpro 78', 90'; Boshell 82'		N'Guessan 60' (pen.)	Stadium: Blundell Park; Attendance: 5,133

10 March 2009 34	Lincoln City	1–0	Wycombe Wanderers	Lincoln
	Elding 49'			Stadium: Sincil Bank; Attendance: 2,562

14 March 2009 35	Lincoln City	1–1	Bury	Lincoln
	Wright 30'; Elding (red card) 45'		Bishop 82'	Stadium: Sincil Bank; Attendance: 3,642

17 March 2009 36	Lincoln City	0–1	Darlington	Lincoln
			Carlton 7'	Stadium: Sincil Bank; Attendance: 2,835

21 March 2009 37	Barnet	3–2	Lincoln City	London
	O'Flynn 37', 87'; Adomah 63'		O'Connor 15'; Pătulea 65'	Stadium: Underhill; Attendance: 1,979

28 March 2009 38	Lincoln City	1–1	Notts County	Lincoln
	Mullarkey 67'		Facey 64'	Stadium: Sincil Bank; Attendance: 4,027

31 March 2009 39	Lincoln City	1–0	Macclesfield Town	Lincoln
	Pătulea 27'			Stadium: Sincil Bank; Attendance: 2,478

4 April 2009 40	Accrington Stanley	0–2	Lincoln City	Accrington
			Kerr 4', 50'	Stadium: Crown Ground; Attendance: 1,139

7 April 2009 41	Chesterfield	1–1	Lincoln City	Chesterfield
	Lester 35'		Pătulea 52'	Stadium: Saltergate; Attendance: 3,419

11 April 2009 42	Lincoln City	0–0	Luton Town	Lincoln
				Stadium: Sincil Bank; Attendance: 4,664

13 April 2009 43	Bradford City	1–1	Lincoln City	Bradford
	Bullock 65'		Hutchinson 47'	Stadium: Coral Windows Stadium; Attendance: 12,932

18 April 2009 44	Lincoln City	0–1	Exeter City	Lincoln
			Burch 88' (o.g.)	Stadium: Sincil Bank; Attendance: 3,934

25 April 2009 45	Shrewsbury Town	0–0	Lincoln City	Shrewsbury
				Stadium: Prostar Stadium; Attendance: 6,740

2 May 2009 46	Lincoln City	0–2	Aldershot Town	Lincoln
			Grant 26'; Davies 88'	Stadium: Sincil Bank; Attendance: 3,910

=== FA Cup ===
8 November 2008 Round 1	Kettering Town	1–1	Lincoln City	Kettering
	Geohaghon 85'		N'Guessan 86'	Stadium: Rockingham Road; Attendance: 3,314

18 November 2008 Round 1 replay	Lincoln City	1–2	Kettering Town	Lincoln
	John-Lewis 54'		Westcarr 68'; Christie 90'	Stadium: Sincil Bank; Attendance: 3,953

=== League Cup ===
12 August 2008 Round 1	Derby County	3–1 (a.e.t.)	Lincoln City	Derby
	Ellington 83', 100', 105'		Wright 48'	Stadium: Pride Park; Attendance: 10,091

=== Football League Trophy ===
23 September 2008 Northern Section Round 2	Leicester City	0–0 (3–1 p)	Lincoln City	Leicester
				Stadium: Walkers Stadium; Attendance: 8,046

== Players ==
=== First-team squad ===
Includes all players who were awarded squad numbers during the season.

Note: Flags indicate national team as defined under FIFA eligibility rules; some limited exceptions apply. Players may hold more than one non-FIFA nationality.

No.	Pos.	Nation	Player
1	GK	ENG	Rob Burch
2	DF	ENG	Paul Green
3	DF	ENG	Aaron Brown
4	DF	HUN	János Kovács
5	DF	WAL	Lee Beevers
6	DF	JAM	Frank Sinclair
7	MF	ENG	Stefan Oakes
8	MF	IRL	Lee Frecklington
9	FW	ENG	Geoff Horsfield
11	MF	ENG	Scott Kerr
12	MF	FRA	Dany N'Guessan
13	GK	ENG	Ayden Duffy
14	FW	ENG	Lenell John-Lewis
15	FW	ENG	Ben Wright

No.	Pos.	Nation	Player
16	DF	ENG	Danny Hone
18	MF	ENG	Martin Pembleton
19	MF	ENG	Shane Clarke
20	MF	WAL	Owain Warlow
21	FW	ENG	Gary King
22	FW	ENG	Sam Mullarkey
23	FW	ROU	Adrian Pătulea
24	FW	ENG	Nathan Adams
25	DF	ENG	Moses Swaibu
26	FW	ENG	Andy Hutchinson
27	MF	ENG	James Bennett (on loan from Hull City)
28	DF	ENG	Kern Miller
29	DF	ENG	Luca Coleman-Carr

=== Left club during season ===
Note: Flags indicate national team as defined under FIFA eligibility rules; some limited exceptions apply. Players may hold more than one non-FIFA nationality.

No.	Pos.	Nation	Player
9	FW	WAL	Kevin Gall (returned to parent club Carlisle United following loan spell)
17	FW	SCO	David Graham
26	FW	ENG	Paris Simmons (returned to parent club Derby County following loan spell)
10	FW	ENG	Anthony Elding (returned to parent club Crewe Alexandra following loan spell)
17	MF	NIR	Michael O'Connor (returned to parent club Crewe Alexandra following loan spell)
