= 2005–06 Lincoln City F.C. season =

Lincoln City
2005–2006 season
- Manager: Keith Alexander
- Stadium: Sincil Bank
- League Two: 7th
- FA Cup: First round
- League Cup: Second round
- League Trophy: First round

During the 2005–06 season, Lincoln City competed in Football League Two.

== Competitions ==
=== Football League Two ===
==== League table ====
Pos	Team	Pld	W	D	L	GF	GA	GD	Pts	Promotion, qualification or relegation
5	Cheltenham Town (O, P)	46	19	15	12	65	53	+12	72	Qualification for League Two play-offs
6	Wycombe Wanderers	46	18	17	11	72	56	+16	71	Qualification for League Two play-offs
7	Lincoln City	46	15	21	10	65	53	+12	66	Qualification for League Two play-offs
8	Darlington	46	16	15	15	58	52	+6	63	
9	Peterborough United	46	17	11	18	57	49	+8	62	

Rules for classification: In the Football League goals scored (GF) takes precedence over goal difference (GD).
(O) Play-off winners; (P) Promoted

==== Results ====
Win	Draw	Loss

Date	K-O	Venue	Opponent	Result^{1}	Goals	Cards	Attendance	Referee	Source
6 August	15:00	Home	Northampton Town	1–1	64' Birch	None	5,397	Eddie Ilderton	
9 August	19:45	Away	Chester City	2–2	38' Brown; 43' Birch	(yellow card) 45' Molango; (yellow card) 50' Marriott; (yellow card) 78' Mayo; (red card) 90' Morgan	2,637	Russell Booth	
13 August	15:00	Away	Notts County	1–2	30' Brown	(yellow card) 80' McCombe	6,153	Martin Atkinson	
20 August	15:00	Home	Oxford United	2–1	62' Birch; 74' Asamoah	(yellow card) 37' Mayo; (yellow card) 69' Kerr; (yellow card) 74' Molango; (yellow card) 79' Birch; (yellow card) 83' (red card) Mayo	3,724	Colin Webster	
27 August	15:00	Away	Rushden & Diamonds	1–1	19' Keates	(yellow card) 61' Beevers; (yellow card) 66' Keates	2,860	Jarnail Singh	
29 August	15:00	Home	Carlisle United	0–0	None	(yellow card) 44' Kerr	4,303	Darren Deadman	
10 September	15:00	Away	Bristol Rovers	0–0	None	None	5,057	Trevor Parkes	
13 September	19:45	Home	Wrexham	2–0	64' Brown; 90' Keates	None	2,956	Andy Penn	
17 September	15:00	Home	Peterborough United	1–2	85' Keates	(yellow card) 40' Brown; (yellow card) 49' Cryan; (yellow card) 61' Kerr	5,526	Gary Lewis	
24 September	15:00	Away	Torquay United	1–2	10' McAuley	(yellow card) 65' Beevers; (yellow card) 68' M. Robinson; (yellow card) 78' (red card) Beevers; (red card) 88' Morgan; (red card) 88' Marriott	2,281	Paul Melin	
27 September	19:45	Home	Stockport County	2–0	53', 78' Birch	None	3,508	Neil Swarbrick	
1 October 2005		Away	Bury	1–1					
7 October 2005		Home	Cheltenham Town	0–1					
15 October 2005		Away	Leyton Orient	1–1					
22 October 2005		Home	Wycombe Wanderers	1–2					
29 October 2005		Away	Rochdale	2–1					
12 November 2005		Home	Shrewsbury Town	1–1					
18 November 2005		Away	Cheltenham Town	1–4					
26 November 2005		Away	Northampton Town	1–1					
3 December 2005		Home	Macclesfield Town	2–2					
10 December 2005		Home	Chester City	3–1					
16 December 2005		Away	Oxford United	1–0					
26 December 2005		Home	Boston United	0–0					
28 December 2005		Away	Grimsby Town	0–3					
31 December 2005		Home	Darlington	2–2					
2 January 2006		Away	Mansfield Town	0–0					
7 January 2006		Away	Wrexham	1–1					
14 January 2006		Home	Barnet	4–1					
21 January 2006		Away	Peterborough United	1–1					
28 January 2006		Home	Bristol Rovers	1–0					
4 February 2006		Away	Stockport County	3–2					
11 February 2006		Home	Torquay United	2–0					
14 February 2006		Away	Barnet	3–2					
18 February 2006		Away	Macclesfield Town	1–1					
25 February 2006		Home	Notts County	2–1					
11 March 2006		Home	Rushden & Diamonds	2–2					
18 March 2006		Away	Boston United	1–2					
25 March 2006		Home	Grimsby Town	5–0					
28 March 2006		Away	Carlisle United	0–1					
1 April 2006		Away	Darlington	2–4					
8 April 2006		Home	Mansfield Town	1–1					
15 April 2006		Home	Bury	1–1					
17 April 2006		Away	Wycombe Wanderers	3–0					
22 April 2006		Home	Leyton Orient	1–1					
29 April 2006		Away	Shrewsbury Town	1–0					
6 May 2006		Home	Rochdale	1–1					

=== FA Cup ===
Win	Draw	Loss

Round	Date	Venue	Opponent	Result^{1}	Attendance	Ref
First round	5 November 2005	Home	Milton Keynes Dons	1–1	3,508	
First round (replay)	15 November 2005	Away	Milton Keynes Dons	1–2	4,029	

=== Football League Cup ===
Win	Draw	Loss

Round	Date	Venue	Opponent	Result^{1}	Attendance	Ref
First round	23 August 2005	Home	Crewe Alexandra	5–1	2,782	
Second round	21 September 2005	Away	Fulham	4–5	5,365	

=== Football League Trophy ===
Win	Draw	Loss

Round	Date	Venue	Opponent	Result^{1}	Attendance	Ref
First round	18 October 2005	Away	Tranmere Rovers	1–2	3,210	

=== Notes ===
- 1. Lincoln City goals listed first.
