= Scott Kerr =

English footballer (born 1981)

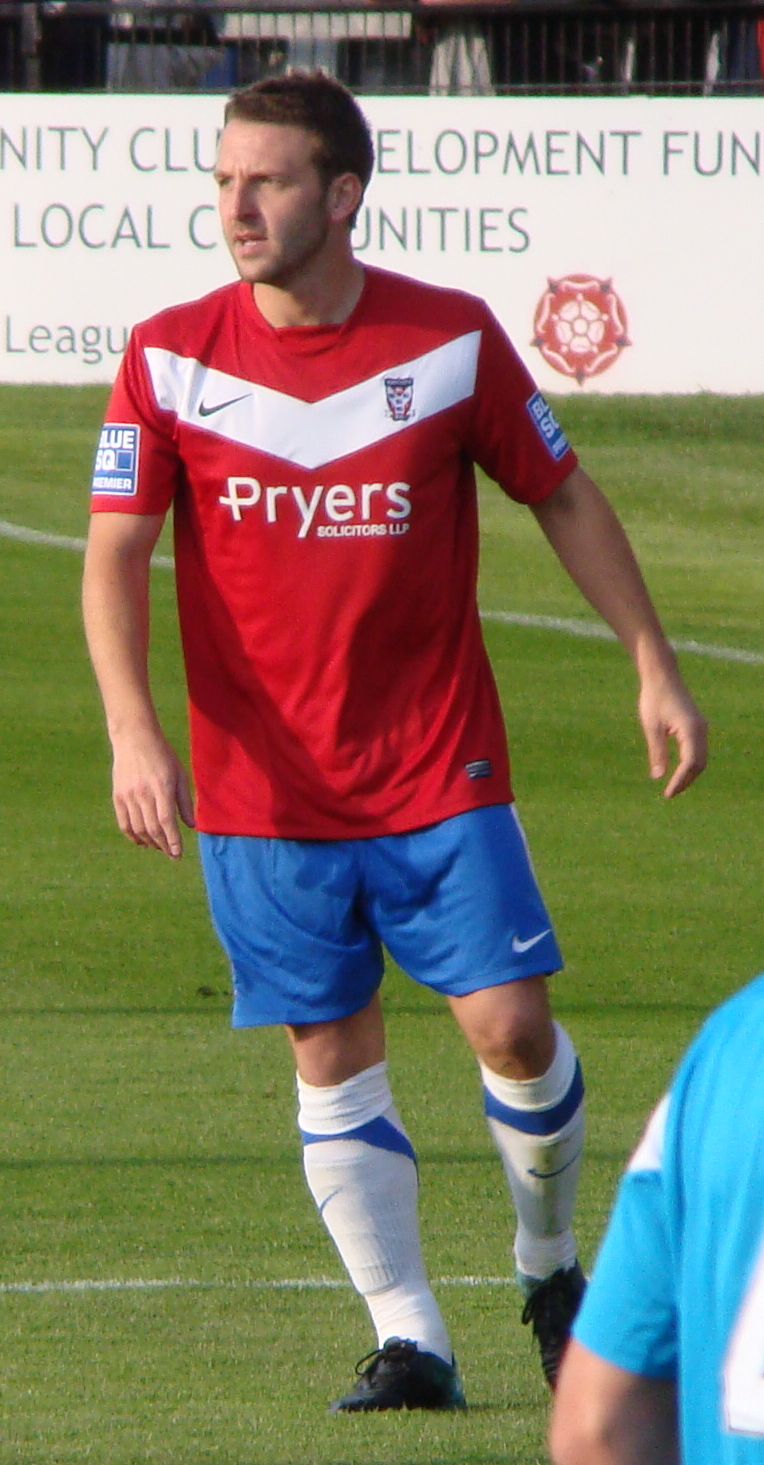
- Kerr playing for York City in 2011

Personal information
- Full name: Scott Anthony Kerr
- Date of birth: 11 December 1981 (age 44)
- Place of birth: Leeds, England
- Height: 5 ft 9 in (1.75 m)
- Position: Midfielder

Team information
- Current team: Bridlington Town (manager)

Youth career
- –1995: Leeds United
- 1995–2000: Bradford City

Senior career*
Years	Team	Apps	(Gls)
2000–2001	Bradford City	1	(0)
2001–2003	Hull City	0	(0)
2002	→ Frickley Athletic (loan)	5	(1)
2003–2005	Scarborough	84	(1)
2005–2011	Lincoln City	221	(8)
2011–2013	York City	78	(0)
2013–2014	Grimsby Town	37	(1)
2014	Bradford Park Avenue	11	(2)
2014	→ Hyde (loan)	5	(0)
2014–2015	Stalybridge Celtic	8	(0)
2015–2016	Spennymoor Town		
2016–2017	Ossett Albion		
Total		443	(12)

International career
2004–2005	England National Game XI	9	(1)

Managerial career
- 2025–: Bridlington Town
- * Club domestic league appearances and goals

Scott Anthony Kerr (born 11 December 1981) is an English former professional footballer who played as a midfielder.

Kerr played a solitary game in the Premier League for Bradford City during the 2000–01 season, although notably he spent time in the Football League and was captain of Lincoln City over a six-year spell. He also played professionally for Hull City, Scarborough, York City and Grimsby Town, as well as spells at a semi-pro standard for Frickley Athletic, Bradford Park Avenue, Hyde, Spennymoor Town and Ossett Albion.

== Club career ==
=== Early career ===
Born in Leeds, West Yorkshire, Kerr played in the youth system at Leeds United before being released and joining Bradford City in 1995 at the age of 14. He signed his first professional contract with Bradford on 4 July 2000. He left Bradford to join Yorkshire rivals Hull City, playing in the Third Division, for a nominal fee on 18 June 2001. He spent his first season at Hull on the injury list with a back injury and when fit for his second season failed to make an impression. In September 2002 he joined Northern Premier League Premier Division side Frickley Athletic on loan, scoring on his debut against Harrogate Town on 17 September 2002. After a month at Frickley he returned to Hull but failed to make the first team and in March 2003 he left the club without making a single senior appearance. He joined Football Conference team Scarborough on a contract until the end of the 2002–03 season in March 2003.

=== Lincoln City ===
Kerr expressed his desire to leave Scarborough in June 2005 to return to the Football League and held talks with Barnet and Lincoln City. He opted to sign for Lincoln on a two-year contract on 1 July. He enjoyed an impressive debut season for Lincoln, under then manager, Keith Alexander, helping them reach their fourth successive play-off spot (albeit an unsuccessful one). The style of football played under Alexander, however, often undermined Kerr's ability as a midfielder, despite his presence being felt throughout the campaign. The 2006–07 season, however, under head coach John Schofield, meant that Kerr was able freely showcase his abilities. Kerr, as a consequence, formed a solid partnership with Lee Frecklington in the middle of the park for Lincoln, helping them in their promotion push for the fifth successive season.

In the 2008–09 season, Kerr continued to captain the side and be a creative influence. Following the sale of Frecklington to Peterborough in January 2009, Kerr found himself playing with a number of midfield partners as Peter Jackson experimented to find the best combination, after trying to play alongside Shane Clarke and Stefan Oakes. Jackson decided to bring Michael O'Connor in on loan from Crewe Alexandra. Kerr started to flourish due to the freedom O'Connor gave him and Kerr scored his first two goals of the season in Lincoln's 2–0 win at Accrington Stanley in April. He was named as Lincoln's Player of the Year for the 2008–09 season.

=== York City ===
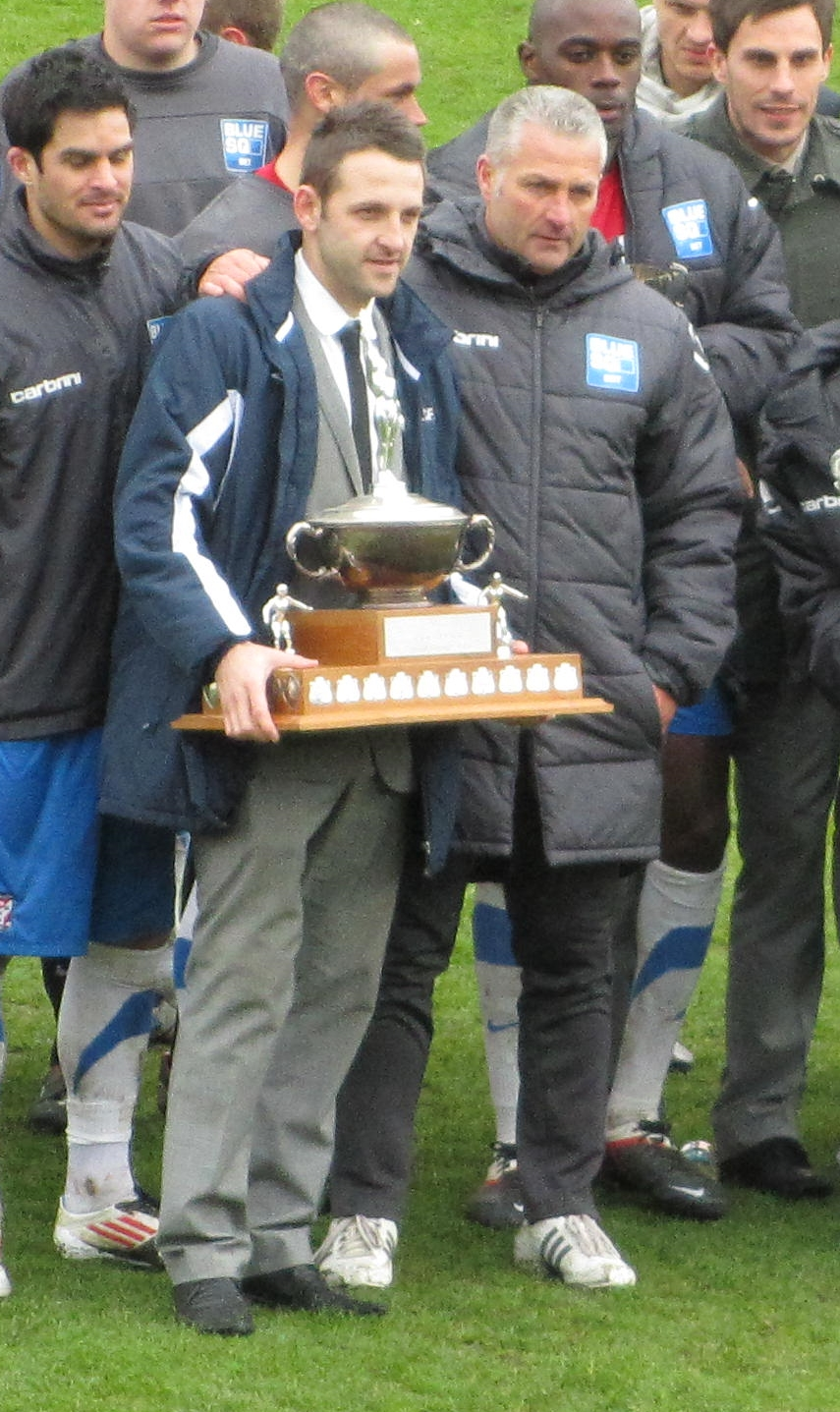
Kerr (left) lifting the Billy Fenton Memorial Trophy after being named as York City's Clubman of the Year for the 2011–12 season

Kerr was released from his Lincoln contract to sign for Conference Premier club York City on a one-and-a-half-year contract on 31 January 2011. He was set to join the club on loan in November 2010 after being out of the team at Lincoln, but after reestablishing himself the move no longer appealed to him. He made his debut a day after signing in a 4–1 victory over league leaders AFC Wimbledon. He was stand-in captain for a 2–1 defeat at Cambridge United on 19 March. Kerr was sent off for the first time as a York player for a second bookable offence in a 1–0 victory over Luton Town on 19 April. He finished the 2010–11 season with 16 appearances for York.

Kerr scored his first goal as a York player with the winning goal in a 1–0 victory over Grimsby Town in the FA Trophy quarter-final on 25 February 2012. His 2011–12 season was brought to a premature end after a cruciate ligament was torn following a tackle by Luton midfielder Keith Keane in the FA Trophy semi-final second leg on 17 March 2012. He made 42 appearances and scored one goal that season, and after the final home game of the season against Forest Green Rovers on 28 April 2012 he was named as York's Clubman of the Year. Following York's promotion to League Two following victory in the 2012 Conference Premier play-off final, Kerr signed a new one-year contract after the club exercised a clause in his contract.

He made his return from injury as a 66th-minute substitute in York's 0–0 home draw with Rotherham United on 6 October 2012. However, he was ruled out for the remainder of the 2012–13 season on 11 April 2013 with a back injury, meaning he finished the campaign with 31 appearances. Kerr was released by York on 30 April 2013.

=== Grimsby Town ===
Kerr signed for Conference Premier side Grimsby Town on a one-year contract on 1 June 2013. Kerr was part of the Grimsby side that was defeated in the Conference play-off semi finals before being released on 9 May 2014.

=== Bradford Park Avenue ===
Kerr joined Bradford Park Avenue of the Conference North on 23 June 2014. Having failed to establish himself in the Avenue team, he was loaned out to Conference North rivals Hyde on 17 October 2014 for an initial one-month period.

=== Stalybridge Celtic ===
Kerr joined fellow Conference North side Stalybridge Celtic on a free transfer on 24 November 2014 following his failure to impress during his time with Bradford Park Avenue.

In August 2015 he joined Spennymoor Town before leaving by mutual consent in January 2016. He moved on to join Ossett Albion, debuting in the club's 2–1 Northern Premier League Division One North victory at Droylsden on 30 January 2016.

== International career ==
Kerr earned nine caps and scored one goal for the England National Game XI from 2004 to 2005. He represented the team in the 2004 Four Nations Tournament. The 2005 Four Nations Tournament saw him score in the 3–2 victory against Scotland, a game which won England the tournament.

== Managerial career ==
On the 30th December 2025, it was announced by Bridlington Town that Scott had taken up the roll as manager. This was to be his first managerial roll of his career.

== Personal life ==
He is a supporter of his hometown club Leeds United.

== Career statistics ==
As of match played 25 November 2014.

Club statistics
Club	Season	League			FA Cup		League Cup		Other		Total	
Club	Season	Division	Apps	Goals	Apps	Goals	Apps	Goals	Apps	Goals	Apps	Goals
Bradford City	2000–01	FA Premier League	1	0	0	0	1	0	1 (Note: Appearance in UEFA Intertoto Cup)	0	3	0
Hull City	2002–03	Third Division	0	0	0	0	0	0	1 (Note: Appearance(s) in Football League Trophy)	0	1	0
Frickley Athletic (loan)	2002–03	NPL Premier Division	5	1	0	0	—		0	0	5	1
Scarborough	2002–03	Football Conference	9	0	—		—		—		9	0
Scarborough	2003–04	Football Conference	37	0	6	3	—		2	0	45	3
Scarborough	2004–05	Conference National	38	1	2	0	—		3 (Note: One appearance in Football League Trophy, one in FA Trophy, one in Conference Cup)	0	43	1
Scarborough	Total		84	1	8	3	—		5	0	97	4
Lincoln City	2005–06	League Two	41	2	2	0	2	1	2 (Note: Appearances in League Two play-offs)	0	47	3
Lincoln City	2006–07	League Two	44	3	1	0	1	0	3 (Note: One appearance in Football League Trophy, two in League Two play-offs)	0	49	3
Lincoln City	2007–08	League Two	36	1	2	0	1	0	1	0	40	1
Lincoln City	2008–09	League Two	45	2	2	0	1	0	1	0	49	2
Lincoln City	2009–10	League Two	39	0	2	0	0	0	1	0	42	0
Lincoln City	2010–11	League Two	16	0	3	0	1	0	1	0	21	0
Lincoln City	Total		221	8	12	0	6	1	9	0	248	9
York City	2010–11	Conference Premier	16	0	—		—		—		16	0
York City	2011–12	Conference Premier	34	0	1	0	—		7 (Note: Appearances in FA Trophy)	1	42	1
York City	2012–13	League Two	28	0	2	0	0	0	1	0	31	0
York City	Total		78	0	3	0	0	0	8	1	89	1
Grimsby Town	2013–14	Conference Premier	37	1	4	0	—		5 (Note: Three appearances in FA Trophy, two in Conference Premier play-offs)	0	46	1
Bradford Park Avenue	2014–15	Conference North	11	2	0	0	—		—		11	2
Hyde (loan)	2014–15	Conference North	5	0	—		—		—		5	0
Stalybridge Celtic	2014–15	Conference North	1	0	—		—		0	0	1	0
Career total			443	12	27	3	7	1	29	1	506	17

== Honours ==
Individual

- Lincoln City Player of the Year: 2008–09
- York City Clubman of the Year: 2011–12
