= Keith Alexander (footballer) =

Footballer and manager (1956–2010)

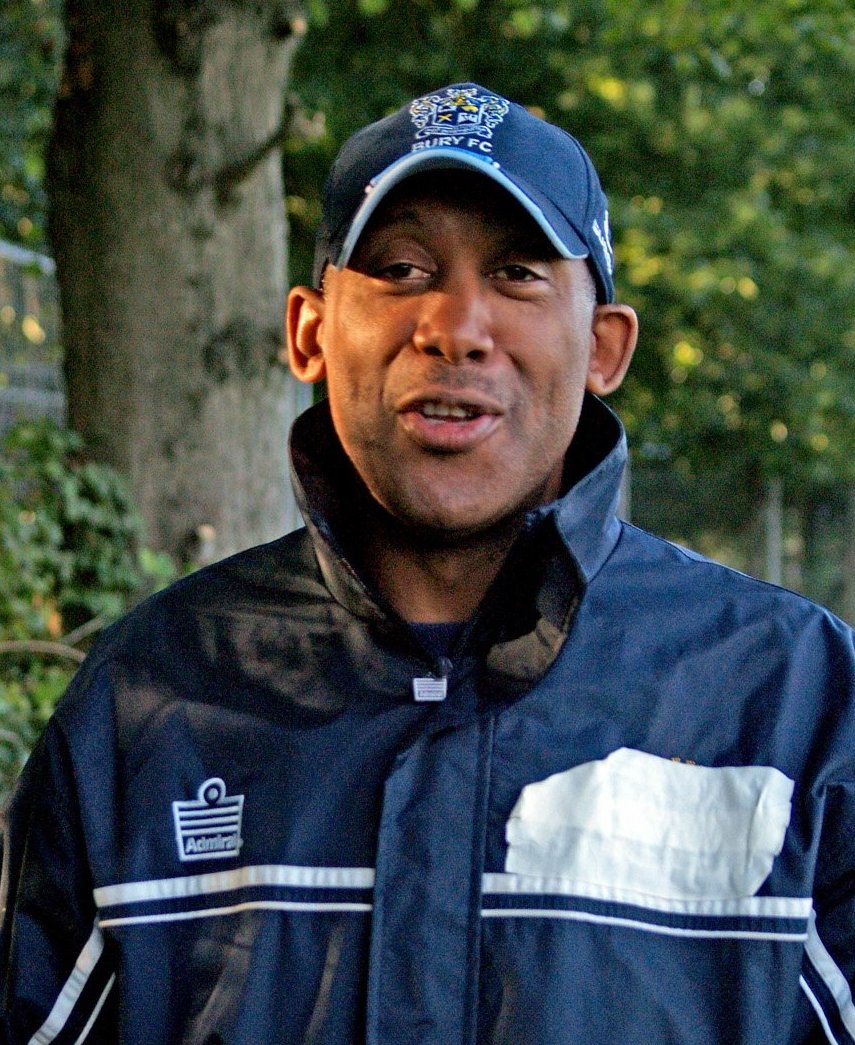
- Alexander in 2007

Personal information
- Full name: Keith Alexander
- Date of birth: 14 November 1956
- Place of birth: Nottingham, England
- Date of death: 3 March 2010 (aged 53)
- Place of death: Lincoln, England
- Height: 6 ft 4 in (1.93 m)
- Position: Centre forward

Senior career*
Years	Team	Apps	(Gls)
1974	Notts County	0	(0)
1975	Wisbech Town		
1975–1976	Arnold		
1976–1977	Worksop Town		
1977	Clifton All Whites		
1977	Attenborough		
1977–1978	Ilkeston Town	17	(1)
1978	Kimberley Town		
1978–1979	Alfreton Town	7	(0)
1979–1980	Stamford	51	(13)
1980–1981	Boston United	7	(0)
1981	King's Lynn	12	(3)
1981–1982	Stamford	43	(11)
1982	Corby Town	2	(1)
1982–1983	Spalding United	37	(18)
1983	Boston Town	0	(0)
1983	Grantham Town	2	(0)
1983–1984	King's Lynn	12	(1)
1984–1986	Kettering Town	74	(11)
1986	→ Wisbech Town (loan)	6	(4)
1986–1988	Barnet	72	(22)
1988–1990	Grimsby Town	83	(26)
1990	Stockport County	11	(0)
1990–1994	Lincoln City	45	(4)
1994–1996	Mansfield Town	3	(0)
1995	→ Cliftonville (loan)	7	(2)
1996	Ilkeston Town	0	(0)
Total		415	(115)

International career
1990	Saint Lucia	3	(0)

Managerial career
- 1993–1994: Lincoln City
- 1996–2000: Ilkeston Town
- 2000–2001: Northwich Victoria
- 2002–2006: Lincoln City
- 2006–2007: Peterborough United
- 2008–2010: Macclesfield Town
- * Club domestic league appearances and goals

Keith Alexander (14 November 1956 – 3 March 2010) was a footballer and manager. Born in Nottingham, England, he was the manager of League Two side Macclesfield Town at the time of his death, in a career that included international appearances for Saint Lucia. Alexander played for a large number of lower league football teams. His main success, however, came from football management – managing in both non-league and the Football League. He took League One side Lincoln City to four consecutive play-offs, taking them to two finals at the Millennium Stadium.

He was believed at the time of his death to have been the first full-time black professional manager in the Football League, though this was in fact Tony Collins at Rochdale in 1960. He was the first black qualified referee in England, and is considered by many to be a pioneer of the modern game.

== Playing career ==
=== Non-league career ===
Alexander began his career in non-league football, joining Arnold as a nineteen-year-old. He spent the 1977–78 season with Ilkeston Town, debuting in the home game with Louth United on 24 September 1977 and going on to make 17 appearances for the club, scoring a single goal, with his final game being the away fixture with Sutton Town on 5 April 1978.

In March 1979, Alexander joined Stamford from Alfreton Town and scored the first goal in the club's 2–0 FA Vase final win over Guisborough Town in April 1980 as the side won the unique treble of United Counties League Championship, League Cup and FA Vase during the 1979–80 season. Leaving at the end of the season, Alexander enjoyed spells with Boston United and King's Lynn before returning to Stamford for the 1981–82 season being part of a side which completed a United Counties League double. In total he made 94 appearances for the Daniels, scoring 24 goals. After a short spell at Corby Town, which witnessed Alexander score one goal in two games, he joined Spalding United where he scored 18 goals in the Northern Counties East Football League during his solitary season at the club in 1982–83.

He went on to have brief spells at Boston Town, Grantham Town, and King's Lynn in 1983, before joining Kettering Town just before the start of the 1983–84 season; where he spent two seasons and played 74 games for the Northamptonshire side, scoring 11 times. During his time at Kettering, Alexander had a brief, but successful, loan spell at Wisbech Town, and was instrumental in the club's FA Vase run that year – scoring a hat-trick against Harwich & Parkeston in a 5–0 win on his debut, followed by a goal in the semi-final against Southall. In the middle of 1986, Barry Fry secured the signing of Alexander at Barnet, who were playing in the Football Conference at the time. He scored 22 goals in 72 games in his two years at the club as the club narrowly missed out on promotion.

=== League career ===
After many years in non-league, Alexander ended his playing career in league football, most notably for Grimsby Town. He earned his move from non-league to the Football League when then-Grimsby manager Alan Buckley saw Alexander playing for Barnet, and subsequently signed him for £11,500. He made his Grimsby debut against Torquay United in September 1988, and went on to score 14 league goals in 44 games during the club's 1988–89 campaign; including a goal against FA Cup holders Wimbledon at Plough Lane. The following season, Alexander scored a further 12 goals in 38 games, including the two goals that ensured Grimsby's promotion in a 2–0 win over Southend United. He then joined Stockport County, before linking up with Lincoln City for the 1992–93 season.

After a short spell as Lincoln City manager, he played a couple more games for Mansfield Town, before joining Northern Ireland outfit Cliftonville on loan. During his brief spell at Cliftonville during the 1994–95 season, Alexander scored on his debut in a 4–3 victory over Portadown, as well as netting a further goal against Glentoran. He also scored twice for Cliftonville as they eliminated Linfield in the League Cup quarter final at Windsor Park. He returned to his parent club, Mansfield, at the end of the season and made one further appearance the following year; coming on as a substitute in a game against Exeter City in January 1996. It was to signal the end of Alexander's playing days, as he broke his leg in injury-time. He did, however, remain registered as a player in the first season of managing Ilkeston Town, although he did not make any first-team appearances.

=== Honours ===
Alexander won the FA Vase in 1980 with Stamford, scoring one of the goals in a 2–0 win over Guisborough Town at Wembley. While he was playing for Grimsby Town, Alexander played international football for St. Lucia, earning three international caps in 1990. Alexander also became Mansfield Town's oldest ever goal scorer when he came off the bench to score twice against Crewe Alexandra at the age of 37.

== Management career ==
=== First spell with Lincoln City ===
With his playing career winding down, Alexander was appointed youth team coach for Lincoln City, during which time he developed the likes of Darren Huckerby and Matt Carbon. At the end of the 1992–93 season, Lincoln's chairman John Reames announced that Steve Thompson's contract as first team manager would not be renewed and Alexander was placed in caretaker charge, steering the Imps to a 2–0 home victory over Darlington in the final game of the season. Officially appointed to the role in the summer of 1993, Alexander became the first permanently appointed black manager in the Football League; Edwin Stein had earlier been in temporary charge at Barnet. He lasted only a season in charge before Sam Ellis succeeded him in the hot seat.

=== Lower league management ===
For the best part of a decade, Alexander then managed two semi-professional teams, Ilkeston Town during 1996–2000 and Northwich Victoria during 2000–01. During his time at Ilkeston, Alexander ensured the club's highest ever league placing, as well as two FA Cup runs that witnessed the side beat league opposition in the form of Boston United and Carlisle United. He is believed to be "the most successful manager in Ilkeston Town's history". He subsequently took charge of Northwich Victoria during the 2000–01 season, with Northwich in the relegation zone five points adrift from safety. Alexander orchestrated a great escape to steer Victoria away from relegation and to keep the club in the top tier of non-league football. The club also had an FA Cup run during the same season, which witnessed them hold Leyton Orient 3–3 in the second round.

=== Return to Lincoln City ===
On 11 July 2001, Alexander returned to Sincil Bank as Director of Coaching on a three-year contract. He was tasked with ensuring the continuity of coaching and football from the Centre of Excellence through youth to the first team and acting as Assistant Manager to Alan Buckley, his former Grimsby Town manager. With Lincoln entering administration at the end of the 2001–02 season, Buckley was relieved of his duties as manager on financial grounds and Alexander placed in charge of all football matters.

==== 2002–03 season ====
On 3 May 2002 Lincoln successfully petitioned to go into administration but the financial crisis would leave the first team squad bereft of players as the day saw five senior players – Jason Barnett, Grant Brown, David Cameron, Steve Holmes and Justin Walker – released at the end of their contracts with a sixth, Lee Thorpe, departing for Leyton Orient. A hectic day finished with confirmation of Alexander's official appointment as team manager. Three other senior players, Tony Battersby, Kingsley Black, and Ian Hamilton, would later leave the club by mutual consent as their contracts, including appearance money, had made them too expensive for Alexander's plans.

Remaining at the club were former Tottenham Hotspur youngsters Alan Marriott and Peter Gain, Northern Ireland B international centre-back Paul Morgan along with midfielders Adam Buckley, Mark Camm and Ben Sedgemore and wing-backs Mark Bailey and Stuart Bimson and Alexander complemented their talents with a series of signings from outside of the Football League. After just one week in the job, Alexander completed his first two signings bringing Ben Futcher and Dene Cropper to the club on initial one-year contracts. One week later, Alexander made a second double swoop with Simon Weaver and Simon Yeo joining the ranks.

Alexander oversaw an upturn in fortunes at the club, who were now owned by their Supporters' Trust. He used direct tactics and, following a good season with an impressive away record, they finished in the play-off places with a chance of promotion to the Second Division. However, Lincoln were defeated by AFC Bournemouth in the play-off final at the Millennium Stadium, Cardiff. The 5–2 result established a new record for goals scored in a playoff final. Alexander was highly praised for his work at Lincoln during the 2002–03 season, taking a club that had finished two places off the bottom of the League and was working its way out of administration, to a play-off position on a shoe-string budget. He subsequently earned the nickname 'Alexander the Great'.

==== 2003–04 season ====
The 2003–04 season began poorly, and in November 2003 Alexander suffered a cerebral aneurysm. Alexander had been accompanied by his assistant Gary Simpson on a scouting mission that evening but felt ill on returning home and retired to bed. His wife later called an ambulance and Alexander was rushed to the Royal Hallamshire Hospital in time for potentially life saving surgery. His condition slowly improved and he returned to work in February 2004, where Simpson had been acting as caretaker manager.

Despite their poor start to the season, Lincoln's campaign improved. Veteran Stuart Bimson had moved on, to Cambridge United, and youngster Paul Mayo was sold to Watford for an initial £75,000, but the acquisitions of Jamie McCombe, Marcus Richardson, Gary Taylor-Fletcher, Francis Green and loanee Kevin Ellison meant that they finished in the play-off places. Lincoln were beaten by Huddersfield Town in the semi-finals.

In the close season Alexander purchased Gareth McAuley and Ciaran Toner. Toner and Marcus Richardson were later involved in a training ground fracas, and were both allowed to leave on loan with a view to a transfer. Regardless, rumours persisted that the morale of the squad was low both because of this incident, and in relation to the payment of bonuses. Lincoln again finished in the play-off places and played Southend United in the final, again at Cardiff's Millennium Stadium. Neither side could manage a goal in normal time, and all three strikers had to be replaced in the second half. Derek Asamoah, who was in poor form, was brought on alongside defenders Matt Bloomer and Lee Beevers. However, Southend scored twice in extra time to win.

Alexander signed a new three-year contract in May 2005. During the close season Simon Yeo, Richard Butcher and Peter Gain chose to leave the club, whilst Gary Taylor-Fletcher was surprisingly released amid speculation about his conduct. Captain Paul Morgan, however, signed a new three-year deal which reportedly made him the highest paid player at the club. Lincoln lost yet again in the play-offs at the end of the 2005–06 season, this time to local rivals Grimsby Town, giving Alexander the unenviable record of being the only manager to lead a team to four consecutive play-off defeats. Shortly after this defeat, Alexander left Lincoln by mutual consent.

=== Peterborough United ===
On 30 May 2006, Alexander was named the new manager of Peterborough United replacing Steve Bleasdale, who had left at the end of April. He cited his reason for joining Peterborough as need for a new challenge. Alexander signed a four-year contract with the club. His managerial career at Peterborough got off to a fine start, recording a 4–1 win over Bristol Rovers on the first day of the season, as well as knocking out Championship side Ipswich Town in the League Cup two weeks later. Despite still sitting in 8th in the league, his contract was mutually terminated following 6 straight league defeats in January 2007. During his time at Peterborough, Alexander stated that he wanted to "unearth more non-league gems", and as a result signed George Boyd, Aaron McLean and Craig Mackail-Smith from non-league – all of whom went on to play in the Championship.

=== Director of football at Bury ===
Alexander was appointed as Bury's new director of football on 9 May 2007. He was dismissed on 14 January 2008, accompanying sacked manager Chris Casper.

=== Macclesfield Town ===
Alexander was appointed manager of Macclesfield Town on 27 February 2008, signing a contract until the end of the season. He replaced Ian Brightwell who had left the club one point away from the League Two relegation zone. His first game in-charge of Macclesfield was a 1–1 draw at home to Notts County, and secured his first win as boss shortly after in a 1–0 win at Dagenham & Redbridge. A run of four wins and three draws in nine games took the club away from the relegation zone, and in April 2008 Alexander was awarded a new two-year contract. He signed a two-year contract extension on 18 January 2010.

== Charitable work ==
Alexander was involved in supporting a number of charities. In Saint Lucia, the country Alexander represented in his playing days, he established the Sacred Sports Foundation to help increase sporting opportunities for St Lucian children.

== Death ==
Alexander, who suffered a brain aneurysm in 2003 when manager of Lincoln City, was taken to hospital before a match in March 2009 after complaining of feeling unwell but was later given a clean bill of health. Alexander was reported to be feeling unwell as he returned from a game at Notts County on 2 March 2010. He was taken to Lincoln Hospital after he had collapsed, and died shortly after at the age of 53. It was reported that Alexander had been suffering from a bout of hiccups three weeks before his death. Alexander had been due to take charge of his 100th game for Macclesfield Town the following weekend.

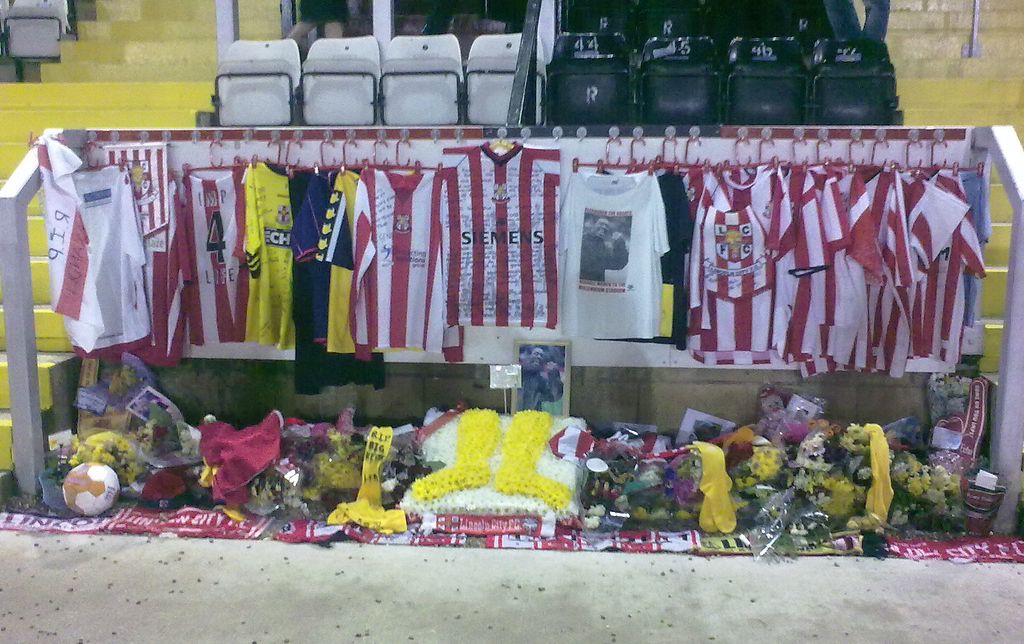
A memorial to Alexander at Lincoln City's Sincil Bank

Tributes were paid to Alexander following his death. Macclesfield Town chairman Mike Rance paid an emotional tribute to Alexander, stating "it was perhaps fitting that the last conversation we had was about football". Lincoln City, the club that Alexander lead to four successive play-off campaigns, opened their stadium to allow fans to pay tribute to him. Grimsby Town also had opened up the gates of their stadium to allow fans to lay flowers and memorabilia for Alexander in front of the Pontoon stand. The club also announced that they would collect money for some of Alexander's favourite charities. Grimsby also wore black arm bands for Keith during their victory over Shrewsbury Town. Burnley manager Brian Laws said Alexander "broke the mould" for black managers. A sentiment echoed by Port Vale boss, Micky Adams. Paul Ince, a friend of Alexander, described him as "a figure that all managers should aspire to". Northern Ireland football team Cliftonville also paid respect to Alexander, with their chairman, Gerard Lawlor, saying "I thank Keith Alexander for the great goals, the great nights and for always being a friend to our club".

Macclesfield Town's first game after Alexander's death was away to Hereford United, with Macclesfield players wearing special shirts with a tribute printed on the back reading "Rest in Peace Gaffer" – Macclesfield won the game 2–0. In what was an emotionally charged day, after Macclesfield scored both of their goals, all of their players pointed to the sky. Throughout the game, Macclesfield fans chanted "Keith Alexander, his spirit lives on", and the players and staff at the club dedicated the win to him. After the game, Richard Butcher, who played under Alexander for Lincoln City, Peterborough United, and Macclesfield Town said "there are a few tears in that dressing room now. Today was Keith's day and we're proud that we got the win for him". Macclesfield held a "Keith Alexander Day" on 13 March, the day of the Silkmen's match against Bury at Moss Rose – Macclesfield's first home game since his death. Tributes were made before the game by representatives of the six clubs Alexander had managed, and 53 doves were released. The game ended 2–0 to Macclesfield.

Additionally, the England national team and the England under-21s wore black armbands in their respective matches against Egypt and Greece under-21s on the day of Alexander's death as a tribute. Black armbands were worn by clubs up and down the country the following weekend as a mark of respect. Clubs across the country also held either a minute's applause or a minute's silence in respect to Alexander.

Alexander's funeral was held at Lincoln Cathedral on 15 March 2010, with thousands of people paying their respects. Friends, family and football fans gave a round of applause as his coffin entered and left the church. It was announced that a benefit match for Keith Alexander would take place on 3 May 2010 at Sincil Bank. Players such as Paul Merson, Jimmy Floyd Hasselbaink, and Les Ferdinand took part in the match, with over 1,000 tickets being sold. In October 2010, Alexander was honoured with a lifetime achievement award at the Black List celebratory evening at Wembley Stadium, highlighting the influence of African Caribbean figures in British football. Alexander's son, Matt, said "If he was looking down and saw the reaction that followed his death and how valuable people thought he was, he would be smiling. He would realise that all his hard work had paid off."

== Managerial statistics ==
As of 3 March 2010

Team	Country	From	To	Record				
Team	Country	From	To	G	W	L	D	Win %
Lincoln City	England	1 August 1993	16 May 1994	48	13	22	13	27.08
Lincoln City	England	5 May 2002	24 May 2006	213	81	63	69	38.03
Peterborough United	England	30 May 2006	15 January 2007	34	14	13	7	41.18
Macclesfield Town	England	27 February 2008	3 March 2010	99	27	46	26	27.27
Total				394	135	144	115	34.26

== Honours ==
Individual

- League Two Manager of the Month: February 2006
