= Mark Hone =

English footballer

Personal information
- Full name: Mark Joseph Hone
- Date of birth: 31 March 1968 (age 58)
- Place of birth: Croydon, England
- Height: 6 ft 1 in (1.85 m)
- Position: Defender

Youth career
- 1984–1986: Crystal Palace

Senior career*
| Years | Team | Apps | (Gls) |
| 1986–1989 | Crystal Palace | 8 | (0) |
| 1989–1994 | Welling United | 176 | (13) |
| 1994–1996 | Southend United | 56 | (0) |
| 1996–1998 | Lincoln City | 53 | (2) |
| 1998–1999 | Kettering Town | 31 | (0) |
| 1999–2003 | Welling United | 98 | (2) |
| 2003–2006 | Lincoln United | | |
| 2005–2008 | Spalding United | | |
| 2007–2008 | Lincoln Moorlands Railway | | |

International career
- England Semi-Professional
- * Club domestic league appearances and goals

Mark Joseph Hone (born 31 March 1968) is an English, retired, professional footballer who played in the Football League for Crystal Palace, Southend United and Lincoln City. Has been manager of Spalding United whilst his son Danny had played for Lincoln City and is currently at conference north side North Ferriby United.

Hone has recently worked in the media. Working for BBC radio Lincolnshire he is a regular on the Football live phone in debate on a Tuesday and Friday discussing issues with Lincoln City and also local non-league sides in the area. Hone has also been the expert summariser on Lincoln City games.

== Playing career ==
A combative midfielder or central defender, Hone began his career at Crystal Palace making eight first team appearances before dropping into the non-league ranks with Welling United. In 1994, he had a second chance in the football league when Southend United paid £50,000 to secure his services.

He spent two years with Southend before moving north to Lincoln City for a further two seasons winning promotion with Lincoln in 1998.

=== Return to Non-League ===
He then dropped back into non-league football with a season at Kettering Town followed by a return to Welling United.

Residing just outside Lincoln, Hone reduced his travel commitments by linking up with Lincoln United in the summer of 2003, making his Northern Premier League debut in the 4–1 home victory over Witton Albion on 16 August 2003.

In February 2006, Hone moved to Spalding United where he fulfilled the role of player/assistant manager to Phil Hubbard. When Hubbard departed Spalding in September 2007, so did Hone, linking up with Lincoln Moorlands Railway before announcing his retirement from playing in December 2007.

== Coaching career ==
Hone coached in the Lincoln City centre of excellence for a number of years, obtaining his UEFA A coaching certificate in the summer of 2002 and coaching the likes of Lee Frecklington and Jack Hobbs. Having acted as Lincoln City's resident matchday hospitality host during the 2008–2009 season, Hone succeeded Alan Biley as manager of Spalding United in July 2009. However, Hone resigned in November 2009, due to work commitments but was then given the opportunity to assist head coach Grant Brown with Lincoln City's youth team for the remainder of that season.

== Family connections ==
Hone has played alongside his elder son David at both Spalding United and Lincoln Moorlands Railway whilst his younger son Danny plays for FC Halifax Town.
