= Sam Mullarkey =

English footballer and MMA fighter

Personal information
- Full name: Samuel Mullarkey
- Date of birth: 24 September 1987 (age 39)
- Place of birth: Lincoln, England
- Position: Striker

Youth career
- 2004–2006: Nottingham Forest

Senior career*
Years	Team	Apps	(Gls)
2006–2007	Lincoln United	3	(0)
2007–2008	Grantham Town	53	(19)
2008–2009	Lincoln City	18	(1)
2009–2010	Lincoln United		
2010–2011	Lincoln United		
2011–2014	Stamford		
2016–2017	Lincoln United		

International career
2002–2003	England U16	5	(0)
- * Club domestic league appearances and goals

Samuel Mullarkey (born 24 September 1987) is an English former professional footballer who played as a midfielder. He now competes as a Mixed Martial Arts fighter in the Lightweight category.

Mullarkey appeared 18 times as a professional in the Football League for Lincoln City, before then he had been snubbed a professional contract with Nottingham Forest having progressed through the club's youth academy. He also played for Grantham Town, Stamford and Lincoln United.

== Football career ==
Sam started off his career at Nottingham Forest as a trainee, however was released without making a first team appearance following the club's snub in order to offer him a professional contract.

Shortly after Mullarkey joined hometown side Lincoln United of the Northern Premier League, but departed the club in 2007. His career was kick started when he joined Grantham Town in 2007, following previous Lincoln United manager John Wilkinson. Mullarkey netted 19 times for the Grantham in 53 appearances, however he sustained injuries in a car accident during the pre-season, delaying his debut.

Mullarkey joined Lincoln City, a team he supported as a boy, towards the end of the 2007–08 season after impressing in a number of pre-season games. Mullarkey was offered a 1-year contract by Peter Jackson, becoming Jackson's 8th signing of the summer. He made his league debut coming on as substitute for Kevin Gall in the home draw with Grimsby Town. He scored his first goal for lincoln on 27 March 2009, against Notts County. He scored just three minutes after Delroy Facey had put Notts County into the lead. The match ended in a draw. Mullarkey strangely rejected a fresh contract with The Imps, after the club had hoped to sign him up for the 2009–2010 season, and then shortly afterwards he left the club along with Adrian Patulea, who like Mullarkey had decided to leave under similar circumstances after he also rejected a fresh deal with the club.

Just before the start of the new season, Mullarkey re-signed for Lincoln United. Mullarkey was released by United in January 2010 due to cost-cutting measures. Despite being released months before, he once again linked up with United for the 2010/2011 season. Mullarkey joined Stamford during July 2011.

== International career ==
Mullarkey made five appearances for the England under-16 side between 2002 and 2003. He featured in the Victory Shield and in the David Carins Memorial Trophy in County Antrim, Northern Ireland.

== Personal life ==
Mullarkey now competes as a Lightweight fighter in Mixed Martial Arts.
