= Rob Burch (footballer) =

English footballer and coach

Personal information
- Full name: Robert Keith Burch
- Date of birth: 8 October 1983 (age 43)
- Place of birth: Yeovil, England
- Height: 6 ft 2 in (1.88 m)
- Position: Goalkeeper

Senior career*
Years	Team	Apps	(Gls)
2002–2007	Tottenham Hotspur	0	(0)
2003	→ Woking (loan)	6	(0)
2004	→ Stevenage Borough (loan)	2	(0)
2004–2005	→ West Ham United (loan)	0	(0)
2005	→ Stevenage Borough (loan)	1	(0)
2005	→ Bristol City (loan)	0	(0)
2007	→ Barnet (loan)	6	(0)
2007–2008	Sheffield Wednesday	2	(0)
2008–2010	Lincoln City	92	(0)
2010–2012	Notts County	15	(0)
Total		124	(0)
- * Club domestic league appearances and goals

Robert Keith Burch (born 8 October 1983) is an English football coach and former professional footballer who works as an assistant coach at Major League Soccer club Colorado Rapids.

As a player he was goalkeeper in a career that lasted from 2002 until 2012. Having come through the youth academy at Tottenham Hotspur he went on to notably feature for several seasons at Lincoln City and amassed 92 of his 124 league appearances for the Imps. He also played for Woking, Stevenage, West Ham United, Bristol City, Barnet, Sheffield Wednesday and Notts County.

== Club career ==
Burch turned professional with Tottenham Hotspur in July 2002 and spent a further five years at the club after signing professional forms.

During that time Burch was loaned out to Conference clubs Woking, in 2003, and Stevenage Borough, in 2004, to gain some first-team experience.

On 10 December 2004 he joined West Ham United on a month's loan to act as cover for Stephen Bywater whilst James Walker recovered from a groin operation; He was given the squad number 41. With Walker returning to fitness, Burch returned to Spurs at the end of the month's loan. In his time at Upton Park he was an unused substitute on six occasions. Indeed, injuries restricted Burch to just seven reserve team appearances in 2004–05.

On 31 August 2005 he joined Bristol City on an initial one-month loan deal, being given the squad number 23. In his time at Ashton Gate, Burch acted as understudy to Steve Phillips whilst the club underwent a change of management with Gary Johnson succeeding Brian Tinnion. Johnson extended Burch's loan period for a second month to enable him to take a closer look at the keeper. However, Burch sustained a knee injury which saw the arrival of Adriano Basso at the club and his return to Tottenham Hotspur.

He finally made his Football League debut on loan at Barnet when he was signed on an emergency 28-day loan on 30 January 2007. He made his debut for the Bees against Notts County.

Burch was released from his contract by Tottenham on 19 May 2007 and signed for Sheffield Wednesday on 2 July. He made his Wednesday debut on 28 August in a 2–1 League Cup second round victory over Hartlepool United. He was released by the club at the end of the season after playing just three competitive matches. Burch agreed to sign for Lincoln City on 30 June 2008.

Burch rejected a new contract with Lincoln in May 2010 and on 8 June he signed a two-year deal for League One club Notts County on a free transfer, after his contract with Lincoln City expired.

In May 2012 he was released by the club, along with 12 other players.

== Career statistics ==
Appearances and goals by club, season and competition
Club	Season	League			FA Cup		League Cup		Other		Total	
Club	Season	Division	Apps	Goals	Apps	Goals	Apps	Goals	Apps	Goals	Apps	Goals
Tottenham Hotspur	2002–03	Premier League	0	0	0	0	0	0	0	0	0	0
Tottenham Hotspur	2003–04	Premier League	0	0	0	0	0	0	0	0	0	0
Tottenham Hotspur	2004–05	Premier League	0	0	0	0	0	0	0	0	0	0
Tottenham Hotspur	2005–06	Premier League	0	0	0	0	0	0	0	0	0	0
Tottenham Hotspur	2006–07	Premier League	0	0	0	0	0	0	0	0	0	0
Tottenham Hotspur	Total		0	0	0	0	0	0	0	0	0	0
Woking (loan)	2002–03	Conference	6	0	0	0	0	0	0	0	6	0
Stevenage Borough (loan)	2004–05	Conference	2	0	0	0	0	0	0	0	2	0
West Ham United (loan)	2004–05	Championship	0	0	0	0	0	0	0	0	0	0
Stevenage Borough (loan)	2004–05	Conference	1	0	0	0	0	0	0	0	1	0
Bristol City (loan)	2005–06	League One	0	0	0	0	0	0	0	0	0	0
Barnet (loan)	2006–07	League Two	6	0	0	0	0	0	0	0	6	0
Sheffield Wednesday	2007–08	Championship	2	0	0	0	1	0	0	0	3	0
Lincoln City	2008–09	League Two	46	0	2	0	1	0	0	0	49	0
Lincoln City	2009–10	League Two	46	0	3	0	1	0	1 (Note: Appearance(s) in Football League Trophy)	0	51	0
Lincoln City	Total		92	0	5	0	2	0	1	0	100	0
Notts County	2010–11	League One	15	0	2	0	1	0	1	0	19	0
Notts County	2011–12	League One	0	0	0	0	0	0	0	0	0	0
Notts County	Total		15	0	2	0	1	0	1	0	19	0
Career total			124	0	7	0	4	0	2	0	137	0

== Coaching career ==
On 21 June 2019, Fulham announced Burch as their new goalkeeping coach having previously held coaching roles with Tottenham Hotspur and The Football Association. On 27 June 2023, Tottenham announced Burch as their new First Team Goalkeeping Coach under newly appointed head coach Ange Postecoglou, starting from 1 July 2023. Burch left the club in July 2025.

== International career ==
Burch is a former England Under-20 keeper.

== Personal life ==
Robert Burch grew up in West Camel with his parents Keith and Barbara, as well as his older sister Fran. He attended Countess Gytha Primary School in Queen Camel. After primary school Rob attended Ansford Community School in Ansford, which is now known as Ansford Academy. Burch proposed to his girlfriend on the This Morning television programme on 14 February 2008. She is a producer on the show, and he surprised her backstage with a little help from Fern Britton The couple were married in 2009.
