= Luca Coleman-Carr =

English footballer

Personal information
- Full name: Luca Paolo Coleman-Carr
- Date of birth: 11 January 1991 (age 35)
- Place of birth: Epsom, England
- Height: 5 ft 9 in (1.75 m)
- Positions: Defender; midfielder

Youth career
- 2007: Woking
- 2007: Yeovil Town
- 2007–2008: Pagham
- 2008–2009: Lincoln City

Senior career*
Years	Team	Apps	(Gls)
2009–2010	Lincoln City	2	(0)
2010–????	Arundel		
- Pagham
2015	Molesey		
2015	Petersfield Town	1	(0)
- * Club domestic league appearances and goals as of 19:04, 1 January 2010 (UTC)

Luca Coleman-Carr (born 11 January 1991) is a footballer who played professionally for Lincoln City.

== Career ==
Coleman-Carr commenced his career as part of the 2007–2008 intake of the youth academy at Woking before moving onto the academy at Yeovil Town whilst also playing for his local Sussex County Football League side Pagham, for whom he played his first senior football for in the 2006–2007 season. In March 2008 he was offered a scholarship with Lincoln City, signing a two-year ASE Scholarship contract in May 2008. In April 2009, he was handed a first team squad number, making his Football League debut as a 70th-minute substitute for Stefan Oakes in the 2–0 home defeat to Aldershot Town on 2 May 2009. He began the 2009–10 season in the matchday squad for the first team, appearing from the bench as a last minute replacement for Joe Heath in the 1–0 Football League home victory over Barnet on 8 August 2009 and being left on the bench in seven of the next eight fixtures. However, after the appointment of Chris Sutton as manager of the Sincil Bank based club he was not utilised in the first team squad again.

He joined Arundel for the 2010–11 season, debuting in the 2–0 Sussex County Football League victory over Sidley United on 7 August 2010. He had the misfortune to be sent-off twice in a week for the club, firstly for a two-footed lunge in the 1–1 league draw at Hassocks on 21 August 2010 and seven days later for a second yellow card in the 6–0 FA Cup defeat at Worthing. He later returned to Pagham and then signed for Molsesey in 2015. Later in the year, he joined Petersfield Town. However, he only made a single appearance as a substitute for the club.
