= Danny Hone =

English footballer

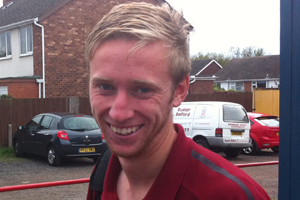

Personal information
- Full name: Daniel Joseph Hone
- Date of birth: 15 September 1989 (age 37)
- Place of birth: Croydon, England
- Height: 6 ft 2 in (1.88 m)
- Position: Defender

Youth career
- 2006–2007: Lincoln City

Senior career*
Years	Team	Apps	(Gls)
2007–2012	Lincoln City	94	(4)
2010–2011	→ Darlington (loan)	21	(1)
2011–2012	→ Barrow (loan)	26	(0)
2012–2013	Gainsborough Trinity	28	(2)
2013–2016	North Ferriby United	75	(8)
2016–2017	FC Halifax Town	19	(3)
Total		263	(18)
- * Club domestic league appearances and goals

Daniel Joseph Hone (born 15 September 1989) is an English former professional footballer.

Hone played as a defender notably in the Football League for Lincoln City. He also played for Darlington, Barrow, Gainsborough Trinity, North Ferriby United and FC Halifax Town.

== Career ==
Hone is a product of the Lincoln City centre of excellence and made his debut in the FA Cup first round match against Nottingham Forest which ended as a 1–1 draw filling in for the injured Lee Beevers and the ineligible Hamza Bencherif. He signed a 2 1/2-year professional contract for Lincoln in December 2007. He scored his first Lincoln City goal in a 2–1 home victory over Rochdale in February 2008.

In May 2011 he was one of just three squad players to be offered a new contract after a mass clear out of players following relegation from the Football League, and he duly signed up for a further year on 30 June 2011. Although he played ten games early in the season for Lincoln, he lost his place in the team and was loaned to Barrow in November 2011.

In May 2012, manager David Holdsworth confirmed that Hone would not be offered a new contract. In July 2012 he joined Gainsborough Trinity on trial, and a week later signed a one-year contract. In May 2013 he signed for North Ferriby United.

Hone then signed for FC Halifax Town in 2016, but departed after a season.

== Career statistics ==
Club	Season	Division	League		FA Cup		League Cup		Other		Total	
Club	Season	Division	Apps	Goals	Apps	Goals	Apps	Goals	Apps	Goals	Apps	Goals
Lincoln City	2007–08	League Two	23	1	2	0	0	0	0	0	25	1
Lincoln City	2008–09	League Two	19	1	2	0	0	0	1 (Note: Appearance(s) in Football League Trophy)	0	22	1
Lincoln City	2009–10	League Two	17	1	0	0	0	0	1	0	18	1
Lincoln City	2010–11	League Two	26	0	0	0	0	0	0	0	26	0
→ Darlington (loan)	2010–11	Conference Premier	21	1	2	0	0	0	1 (Note: Appearance(s) in FA Trophy)	0	24	1
Lincoln City	2011–12	Conference Premier	9	1	0	0	0	0	0	0	9	1
→ Barrow (loan)	2011–12	Conference Premier	26	0	0	0	0	0	2	1	28	1
Gainsborough Trinity	2012–13	Conference North	28	2	0	0	0	0	6	0	34	2
North Ferriby United	2013–14	Conference North	34	5	0	0	0	0	3	0	37	5
North Ferriby United	2014–15	Conference North	27	2	1	0	0	0	7	0	35	2
North Ferriby United	2015–16	National League North	14	1	0	0	0	0	3 (Note: Appearance(s) in National League North play-offs)	1	17	2
FC Halifax Town	2016–17	National League North	19	3	0	0	0	0	0	0	19	3
Career total			263	18	7	0	0	0	24	2	294	20

== Personal life ==
He is the son of former Lincoln City defender, Mark Hone; they are the fifth father and son to represent the club.

Hone now owns and runs an indoor football facility.

== Honours ==
North Ferriby United

- FA Trophy: 2014–15
