= Cian Hughton =

Footballer (born 1989)

Personal information
- Full name: Cian James Hughton
- Date of birth: 25 January 1989 (age 37)
- Place of birth: Enfield, England
- Position: Defender

Youth career
- 2005–2008: Tottenham Hotspur

Senior career*
Years	Team	Apps	(Gls)
2008–2009	Tottenham Hotspur	0	(0)
2009–2011	Lincoln City	63	(6)
2012	Birmingham City	0	(0)

International career
2007	Republic of Ireland U18	4	(0)
2007–2008	Republic of Ireland U19	4	(0)
2009–2010	Republic of Ireland U21	5	(0)
- * Club domestic league appearances and goals

Cian James Hughton (born 25 January 1989) is a former professional footballer who played in the Football League for Lincoln City. A defender, he began his career with Tottenham Hotspur before joining Lincoln City, and was later on the books of Birmingham City. Born in England, he played international football for the Republic of Ireland under-21 team.

== Club career ==
=== Tottenham Hotspur ===
Hughton joined Tottenham Hotspur's academy in 2005, and went on to make 15 youth team appearances that season. Established, he played a further 27 games the following season, scoring once and stepping into the reserve set-up, where he appeared on a total of 21 occasions over two seasons.

=== Lincoln City ===
On 27 July 2009, Hughton signed a six-month contract with Football League Two club Lincoln City. He made his first-team debut in the 1–0 victory over Barnet on 8 August.

He was given a new 18-month contract following the conclusion of his initial deal, but found first team opportunities hard to come by after Chris Sutton left the club and Steve Tilson took over. In May 2011 he was not offered a new contract after a mass clear out of players following the club's relegation from the Football League.

In June 2011 he joined Vancouver Whitecaps of the MLS for a ten-day trial but failed to earn a contract. He also had trials at lower-league clubs including Bristol Rovers, where he appeared in a 5–1 pre-season win over local side Mangotsfield United, and Milton Keynes Dons, where he scored in a 6–0 friendly victory against Buckingham Town. During the summer off-season of 2011, Hughton travelled to Ireland and agreed a deal with Dundalk, only to be told that budget cuts at the club meant the deal could no longer materialise.

=== Birmingham City ===
Having spent several months training with Birmingham City, where his father became manager in June 2011, on 29 February 2012 Hughton signed for the club until the end of the season. He was an unused substitute for the visit to Brighton & Hove Albion, but made no first-team appearances, and was released when his contract expired.

== International career ==
Hughton had numerous calls into the Republic of Ireland under-18 and under-19 squads. He made his under-21 debut as a substitute against Georgia under-21 at Tallaght Stadium on 9 October 2009, and made his first start four days later against Switzerland under-21 at the Waterford Regional Sports Centre.

== Personal life ==
Hughton is the son of former Tottenham Hotspur and Ireland international player, Chris Hughton. His uncle Henry Hughton was also a professional player. Hughton's paternal grandfather was Ghanaian, and his paternal grandmother was Irish.
