= Gary Birch (footballer) =

English footballer (born 1981)

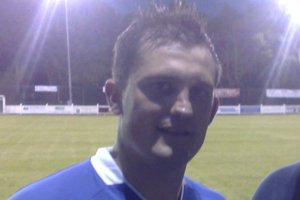
- Birch in 2008

Personal information
- Full name: Gary Stephen Birch
- Date of birth: 8 October 1981 (age 45)
- Place of birth: Birmingham, England
- Height: 5 ft 10 in (1.78 m)
- Position: Striker

Youth career
- ?–1998: Walsall

Senior career*
Years	Team	Apps	(Gls)
1998–2004	Walsall	48	(7)
2001	→ Exeter City (loan)	24	(2)
2001–2002	→ Nuneaton Borough (loan)	5	(3)
2004	→ Barnsley (loan)	8	(2)
2004–2005	Kidderminster Harriers	14	(3)
2005–2007	Lincoln City	37	(8)
2006	→ Tamworth (loan)	1	(0)
2006	→ Hucknall Town (loan)	1	(0)
2007–2008	AFC Telford United	22	(6)
2007	→ Rushall Olympic (loan)	6	(4)
2008–2012	Chasetown	127	(40)
2012–2014	Solihull Moors	55	(10)

Managerial career
- 2014: Highgate United
- 2014–2016: Lichfield City
- 2017: Hednesford Town
- 2017–2018: Walsall Wood
- * Club domestic league appearances and goals

Gary Stephen Birch (born 8 October 1981) is an English former football player and manager who played as a striker. He was most recently the manager at Walsall Wood.

== Playing career ==
Birch scored on his AFC Telford debut in the 4–3 victory against Mossley at Seel Park. Birch came on as a substitute before scoring the winning goal. Struggling with his weight, in September 2007, he was loaned to Rushall Olympic in an attempt to gain match fitness. Birch left the club at the end of the 2007–08 season to join Chasetown.

Birch netted his 50th Chasetown goal in all competitions in a 1–1 home draw with Chorley on 27 August 2011. He departed from the club in June 2012, and signed for Solihull Moors.

== Management career ==
In October 2014 he was appointed manager of Lichfield City, departing in May 2016 after feeling that he had taken the club as far as he could. In November 2016 he joined Hednesford Town as assistant manager to Paul Casey. In February 2017, Casey resigned his role and Birch and fellow assistant Gavin Hurren were placed in temporary charge of first team affairs. On 15 March 2017, Birch was appointed permanent manager of the club.

Birch quit as Hednesford manager to accept a job offer from Walsall Wood on 6 May 2017.
