= Richard Butcher (footballer) =

English footballer

Personal information
- Full name: Richard Tony Butcher
- Date of birth: 22 January 1981
- Place of birth: Northampton, England
- Date of death: 10 January 2011 (aged 29)
- Place of death: Swinton, England
- Position: Midfielder

Senior career*
Years	Team	Apps	(Gls)
1999–2000	Northampton Town	0	(0)
2000–2001	Rushden & Diamonds	0	(0)
2001–2002	Kettering Town	44	(13)
2002–2005	Lincoln City	104	(11)
2005–2006	Oldham Athletic	36	(4)
2005	→ Lincoln City (loan)	4	(1)
2006–2007	Peterborough United	43	(4)
2007–2009	Notts County	80	(18)
2009–2010	Lincoln City	15	(0)
2010	→ Macclesfield Town (loan)	8	(2)
2010–2011	Macclesfield Town	7	(1)
Total		341	(54)
- * Club domestic league appearances and goals

Richard Tony Butcher (22 January 1981 – 9 January 2011) was an English professional footballer who played as a midfielder.

In a career that lasted from 1999 until his death in 2011, he notably spent three separate spells with Lincoln City, for whom he appeared in two play-off final defeats at the Millennium Stadium. He also played for Northampton Town, Rushden & Diamonds, Kettering Town, Oldham Athletic, Peterborough United and Notts County. At the time of his death he was playing for Football League Two side Macclesfield Town.

== Career ==
=== Northampton Town ===
Born in Northampton, Butcher came through the youth ranks at his home town club Northampton Town. He was promoted to the club's first team during the summer of 1999 when the club was under the management tenure of Ian Atkins, however Atkins departed early on into Butcher's first senior season and was replaced by Kevin Wilson. In March 2000, 8 months after becoming a pro he was released by Northampton Town having failed to make an appearance.

=== Rushden & Diamonds ===
After his release from Northampton, Butcher was signed by Brian Talbot's Conference National side Rushden & Diamonds. He was part of the squad for the final months of the 1999–2000 season and the 2000–2001 campaign, but failed to make an appearance for the Diamonds, and was released in the summer of 2001.

=== Kettering Town ===
In October 2001 he signed for Southern League side Kettering Town who had suffered relegation in the previous season from the Conference National. After helping the club back to an instant promotion, Butcher went on to depart the club in November 2002.

=== Lincoln City ===
Butcher joined Football League Third Division Lincoln City which had recently recovered from a financial struggle that had nearly seen the club go out of business. The club was now under the stewardship of Keith Alexander who had begun to bring in a new influx of players to the team. He made his City debut on 23 November 2002 in a 2–1 home defeat against his former club Rushden. He scored his first Imps goal on 14 December in a 2–2 draw with Cambridge United. By the end of the 2002–2003 season Lincoln had gained entry into the Play-offs following a dramatic Simon Yeo equaliser against Torquay United on the final day of the season. City progressed to the final at Cardiff's Millennium Stadium following a 6–3 aggregate victory over Scunthorpe United in the semi-finals. Butcher played the full ninety minutes of the final but could not help Lincoln from losing to AFC Bournemouth 5–2. During the 2003–2004 season Lincoln reached the Play-offs yet again but were defeated by Huddersfield Town in the semi-final. The 2004–2005 campaign saw The Imps qualify for a third successive Play-off spot and after dumping Macclesfield Town out in the semi-final, City were beaten 2–0 by Southend United.

=== Oldham Athletic ===
August 2005 rang in a new era for Butcher when he joined Football League One side Oldham Athletic who were managed by Ronnie Moore. He made his debut for The Latics on the opening day of the 2005–2006 season in a 2–0 victory over Yeovil Town. However, despite figuring in nearly every game up until October he was loaned back to Lincoln City for a month in which he played 4 games, scoring once. Butcher returned to Oldham and completed the rest of the season making 39 overall competition appearances, scoring 4 goals.

=== Peterborough United ===
Butcher was reunited with Keith Alexander when he signed a contract with Peterborough United where he was one of a number of former Lincoln players brought to London Road by United's recently appointed manager. Alexander and Butcher both left United after one season.

=== Notts County ===
Football League Two side Notts County came in for Butcher when his Peterborough contract had run its course and he signed a deal with the Meadow Lane side. Butcher played two seasons with County and worked under Ian McParland. During his time at Notts County, Butcher contributed 18 league goals which played a major role in the team's fight against relegation.

=== Return to Lincoln City ===
On 27 May 2009 Butcher signed a two-year deal at Lincoln City for a third spell, he was Peter Jackson's first signing of the summer. However the club soon after parted company with manager Peter Jackson and his replacement Chris Sutton rarely used him in the first team. Butcher was made available for loan in the new year and departed Sincil Bank in February.

=== Macclesfield Town ===
He re-joined Keith Alexander in February 2010 for a third spell this time with Macclesfield Town, scoring on his debut in a 2–1 defeat to Bury. On 3 March 2010 Alexander suddenly died at home following the club's away match with Notts County. This had come little over a month since Alexander had brought Butcher to Macclesfield. The Silkmen appointed Gary Simpson as manager, who had previously been Alexander's assistant at Lincoln and Peterborough. Butcher signed permanently with Macclesfield in July 2010 following his official release from Lincoln. On 20 May 2010 Butcher signed a two-year deal at Macclesfield Town. The final match of his career was on 3 January 2011 when Macclesfield were beaten 0–2 by Rotherham United.

== Career statistics ==
Appearances and goals by club, season and competition
Club	Season	League			FA Cup		League Cup		Other		Total	
Club	Season	Division	Apps	Goals	Apps	Goals	Apps	Goals	Apps	Goals	Apps	Goals
Northampton Town	1999–2000	Third Division	0	0	0	0	0	0	0	0	0	0
Rushden & Diamonds	1999–2000	Conference	0	0	0	0	0	0	0	0	0	0
Rushden & Diamonds	2000–01	Conference	0	0	0	0	0	0	0	0	0	0
Rushden & Diamonds	Total		0	0	0	0	0	0	0	0	0	0
Kettering Town	2001–02	Southern League Premier	26	9	1	0	0	0	0	0	27	9
Kettering Town	2002–03	Conference	18	4	0	0	0	0	0	0	18	4
Kettering Town	Total		44	13	1	0	0	0	0	0	45	13
Lincoln City	2002–03	Third Division	26	3	0	0	0	0	3 (Note: Appearance(s) in Division Three play-offs)	0	29	3
Lincoln City	2003–04	Third Division	32	6	2	0	1	0	5 (Note: 3 appearances and no goals in Football League Trophy) (Note: 2 appearances and 1 goal in Division Three play-offs)	1	40	7
Lincoln City	2004–05	League Two	46	2	1	0	2	0	4 (Note: 3 appearance(s) in League Two play-offs) (Note: 1 appearance in Football League Trophy)	0	53	2
Lincoln City	Total		104	11	3	0	3	0	12	1	122	12
Oldham Athletic	2005–06	League One	36	4	3	0	2	0	0	0	41	4
Lincoln City (loan)	2005–06	League Two	4	1	0	0	0	0	0	0	4	1
Peterborough United	2006–07	League Two	43	4	4	1	2	0	2 (Note: Appearance(s) in Football League Trophy)	0	51	5
Notts County	2007–08	League Two	46	12	2	0	1	0	0	0	49	12
Notts County	2008–09	League Two	34	6	2	1	2	0	1 (Note: Appearance(s) and goal[s] in Football League Trophy)	1	39	8
Notts County	Total		80	18	4	1	3	0	1	1	88	20
Lincoln City	2009–10	League Two	15	0	0	0	1	0	0	0	16	0
Macclesfield Town (loan)	2009–10	League Two	8	2	0	0	0	0	0	0	8	2
Macclesfield Town	2010–11	League Two	7	1	0	0	1	0	1	0	9	1
Career total			341	54	15	2	12	0	16	2	384	58

== Death ==
Butcher died aged 29 at his Swinton, Salford home on 9 January 2011. After Butcher had failed to turn up for training on Monday morning, club manager Gary Simpson found out after an investigation that Butcher's wife had been away and that he had died overnight. Butcher's death came less than a year after the death of Macclesfield manager Keith Alexander, who had also managed Butcher at both Lincoln City and Peterborough United.

The next match for Macclesfield Town, an away game at Burton Albion originally scheduled for 15 January was then postponed in respect to Butcher and Macclesfield Town. Butcher's shirt number, 21, has been retired as a mark of respect. On 22 January 2011 at Macclesfield's next home game a minute's applause was heard before the game and 30 white doves released (to represent Butcher's 30th birthday as it would have been on the day).

Family, friends and fans paid tribute to Butcher at Lincoln City's Sincil Bank stadium on Wednesday 2 February 2011, the service was attended by fellow footballers and close friends Simon Yeo, Ben Futcher, Paul Morgan and Alan Marriott as well as former Macclesfield teammates and Peterborough United director Barry Fry. A private service was held at Lincoln Crematorium service following the thanksgiving service at the stadium.

A coroner's verdict delivered in June 2011 determined Butcher's death to have been caused by the heart condition cardiac arrhythmia.
