= Stuart Bimson =

English footballer

Personal information
- Full name: Stuart James Bimson
- Date of birth: 29 September 1969 (age 57)
- Place of birth: Liverpool, England
- Height: 5 ft 11 in (1.80 m)
- Position: Defender

Senior career*
Years	Team	Apps	(Gls)
1986–1987	Prescot Cables		
1987–1989	Ellesmere Port & Neston		
1988–1991	Southport	94	(1)
1991–1995	Macclesfield Town	102	(2)
1994–1997	Bury	36	(0)
1996–2003	Lincoln City	175	(4)
2003–2005	Cambridge United	43	(0)
2004–2005	→ Accrington Stanley (loan)	6	(0)
2005–2006	Canvey Island	22	(0)
2006–2007	Chelmsford City	2	(0)
2006–2008	Bedford Town		

Managerial career
- 2006–2008: Bedford Town
- * Club domestic league appearances and goals

Stuart James Bimson (born 29 September 1969) is an English football coach and former professional footballer.

He played in the Football League as a defender for Bury, Lincoln City and Cambridge United making a total of 254 appearances, scoring four goals. He also played at Non-League level for Prescot Cables, Ellesmere Port & Neston, Southport, Macclesfield Town, Accrington Stanley, Canvey Island, Chelmsford City and Bedford Town. Bimson moved into coaching and managed Bedford between 2006 and 2008 before later taking up a coaching role with Southend United's youth team.

== Playing career ==
Bimson began his career with spells with Prescot Cables and Ellesmere Port & Neston. In January 1989, he joined Southport debuting in the 1–0 away victory over Morecambe on 21 January 1989. A virtual ever-present during his time at Haig Avenue, he scored just one league goal for the club in the 2–1 home victory over Horwich RMI on 28 August 1989 before departing at the end of the 1990–1991 season; his final game being the 2–0 away defeat to Stalybridge Celtic on 4 May 1991.

Bimson moved into the Football Conference joining Macclesfield Town at the start of the 1991–1992 season. In August 2005, Bimson agreed a 12-month contract to return to the Football Conference with Canvey Island, debuting in the 1–0 away defeat to Accrington Stanley on 13 August 2005. Following Canvey's voluntary resignation from the Football Conference at the end of the 2005–2006 season, Bimson followed Canvey's manager Jeff King to Chelmsford City. He made his debut in the 2–2 home draw with Leyton on 4 September 2006 with his second, and final game, for the club coming in the 2–1 defeat at Horsham five days later.

Bimson moved on to join Bedford Town debuting in the 2–0 home defeat to Lewes on 2 December 2006. On 16 February 2007, following the departure of manager Nick Platnauer, Bimson was handed the manager's role until the end of the season.

== Coaching career ==
He had a chastening start to his managerial career, suffering a 5–1 away defeat to Lewes followed by a 4-0 thumping at Havant & Waterlooville but secured a 3–1 victory over Thurrock in the next game, his first home match as manager. Although Bedford would finish the season bottom of the Conference South and secure just three victories and three draws in Bimson's 15 games in charge, they finished the season with two victories and two draws in their final four games and this upturn in form saw Bimson handed the manager's post on a permanent basis.

Bimson's first full season in charge saw the Eagles suffer a second relegation as they finished 19th in the Southern Football League Premier Division; the club would later escape relegation following the demise of Nuneaton Borough. Bimson, however, was spared the sack and tasked with rebuilding the side. However, in July, he resigned his post to join Cambridge United as first team coach linking up with his long-term friend Gary Brabin who had been newly appointed as manager of the Us. However, budgetary constraints saw Bimson leave his post at the end of his one-year contract. Still eager to return to management, he applied to become the manager of former club Lincoln City in the wake of Peter Jackson's sacking in September 2009 but was not interviewed for the post. He acted as a scout for Barrow during the 2009–2010 season and from September 2010 he worked as acting assistant manager to Ken McKenna at Altrincham, their first game being the 5-0 Football Conference defeat at Eastbourne Borough on 18 September 2010. After four weeks in the acting capacity he became assistant manager on 14 October 2010 but left at the end of the season following the club's relegation from the Football Conference. In July 2012, he joined the youth set-up at Southend United, becoming Centre of Excellence Development Coach.
