= Paul Morgan (footballer) =

Northern Irish footballer (born 1978)

Personal information
- Full name: Mark Paul Thomas Morgan
- Date of birth: 23 October 1978 (age 48)
- Place of birth: Belfast, Northern Ireland
- Height: 6 ft 1 in (1.85 m)
- Position: Defender

Team information
- Current team: Preston North End (Head of Medical & Physiotherapy U19) Northern Ireland national football team (Head Physiotherapist U19)

Senior career*
Years	Team	Apps	(Gls)
1997–2001	Preston North End	10	(0)
1997–1998	→ Sligo Rovers (loan)	2	(0)
2001–2007	Lincoln City	212	(2)
2007–2009	Bury	20	(0)
2008–2009	→ Macclesfield Town (loan)	39	(0)
2009–2012	Macclesfield Town	67	(0)
Total		338	(2)

International career
1998	Northern Ireland U21	1	(0)
- * Club domestic league appearances and goals

Mark Paul Thomas Morgan (born 23 October 1978) is a Northern Irish former professional footballer Present: Head of Medical and Physiotherapy at Preston North End and the Northern Ireland national football team U19.

Morgan played as a defender in a career lasted from 1997 until 2012, starting out with Preston North End in the 1997–98 campaign. He failed to make an appearance for North End from then until his departure in 2001 and also spent a spell on loan with League of Ireland side Sligo Rovers. His spell in Ireland brought a brief and solitary cap for the Northern Ireland U21 side. In 2001, he joined Lincoln City where he spent seven years of his career, notably qualifying for the League Two play-offs in four consecutive seasons, losing out in the 2002–03 and 2004–05 seasons at the final in the Millennium Stadium. Morgan became Lincoln skipper towards the end of his spell with the club and racked 212 league appearances, scoring 2 goals. Morgan was noted as being one of the best defenders in the lower leagues, he missed opportunities to play higher due to his commitment to Lincoln City. In 2007, he joined Bury where his former Lincoln boss Keith Alexander had taken up the director of football role. After two years with Bury he followed Alexander again to Macclesfield Town where he spent the last three years of his career.

== Club career ==
Born in Belfast, Morgan began his career at Preston North End, spending time on loan at Sligo Rovers during the 1997–98 season. In his time at Sligo, Morgan was part of the team which won the 1997–98 League of Ireland Cup, defeating Shelbourne over two legs in February. His time at Preston was blighted by injury and he made only a solitary League Cup appearance for the club.

On 9 July 2001 Morgan linked up with Lincoln City on an initial one month's contract. Morgan had been offered a new contract by Preston North End but turned it down favouring a move to Sincil Bank in a bid to impress the Imps manager Alan Buckley. After performing well during the pre-season, including scoring on his debut in a 5–1 friendly victory over Collingham on 13 July, he signed a two-year deal with the club on 7 August.

Morgan would go on to captain the side in 2002/3 and formed a fifth of a defence (with Stuart Bimson, Simon Weaver, Ben Futcher and Mark Bailey) that only conceded 37 goals in 46 League games that season. He was consistently linked to sides much higher up the Football League and was widely regarded as one of the best defenders in the lower leagues. He is one of the few players to have been involved in all five of the seasons where Lincoln reached the Playoffs to date, although he missed some of the actual Playoffs due to injury.

Paul scored twice during his time at Lincoln, the latter of which was a 93rd-minute equaliser in an away game at Torquay United, a game which the Imps would then win two minutes later. Thankfully he was rarely beyond the halfway line and his no-nonsense style of defending won him many fans at Sincil Bank.

He signed for Bury on 26 June 2007 where his former Lincoln boss Keith Alexander had taken up the director of football role, but his first season with the club was hampered by a knee injury.

On 8 July 2008 Morgan went on a season-long loan to Macclesfield Town, where he would work with manager Keith Alexander for the third time in his career. He was appointed Macclesfield's captain ahead of the 2010/2011 season by manager Gary Simpson who described him as 'perfect captain material', as well as studying at the University of Salford for a degree in physiotherapy. In May 2012, Morgan was released by Macclesfield due to the expiry of his contract. Morgan joined Conference National side Barrow on trial in July 2012 but was unable to earn a contract. At the age of 33, having been released by Macclesfield at the end of the 2011–12 season, Morgan retired from professional football.

== International career ==
Morgan has represented his national team, Northern Ireland, at Under-16, Under-18 and Under-21 level, however, has not represented them at senior level. His only call up came in 2002/3, but the friendly was cancelled a week before the game was due to be played.

== Physiotherapist ==
At the age of 33, having been released by Macclesfield at the end of the 2011–12 season, Morgan retired from professional football and signed for Accrington Stanley as the club's new head physiotherapist.

In 2022 Morgan returned to Preston North End as Head of Medical and Physiotherapy U19.

In 2019 Morgan also became the Head Physiotherapist for the Montserrat national football team, under Manager and Head Coach Willie Donachie.

At the end of 2023, Morgan joined the U19 Northern Ireland national team as head physiotherapist, alongside manager Gareth McAuley.

== Honours ==
Sligo Rovers

- League of Ireland Cup 1997/98

Lincoln City

- League Two
  - Play-off Finalists (2): 2002/03 (*), 2004/05
  - Play-off semi-finalists (3): 2003/04 (*), 2005/06, 2006/7
  - BBC East Midlands Sports Awards Division Three Footballer of the Year: 2004

Accrington Stanley F.C

- Medicine & Performance Association Awards
  - 2018
  - Medical Team of the Year
