= Paul Green (footballer, born 1987) =

English footballer

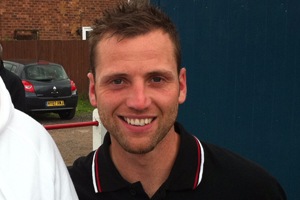
- Green in August 2011

Personal information
- Full name: Paul Michael Green
- Date of birth: 15 April 1987 (age 39)
- Place of birth: Birmingham, England
- Positions: Defender; midfielder

Youth career
- 2003–2007: Aston Villa

Senior career*
Years	Team	Apps	(Gls)
2007–2011	Lincoln City	116	(4)
2011–2012	Tamworth	40	(0)
2012–2014	Forest Green Rovers	43	(2)
2013	→ Hereford United (loan)	7	(0)
2014–2017	Tamworth	83	(7)
2017–2018	Solihull Moors	23	(0)
2018–2019	Tamworth	11	(0)
Total		323	(13)

International career
2002–2003	England U16	8	(0)

Managerial career
- 2014: Tamworth (caretaker assistant)
- 2018–2019: Tamworth (player-coach)
- * Club domestic league appearances and goals as of 1 March 2019

Paul Michael Green (born 15 April 1987) is an English former footballer who played as a defender or midfielder.

== Playing career ==
=== Aston Villa ===
Born in Birmingham, Green started his career as a professional at Aston Villa progressing from the youth ranks. He made it into the Villa squad for pre-season friendlies in the summer of 2006, but was soon released on a free transfer.

=== Lincoln City ===
Paul Green was signed by John Schofield for Lincoln City on 22 January 2007 on the same day as Dany N'Guessan. Green scored his first goal for Imps in the 2006/7 season in a 1–1 draw with Hartlepool United. He enjoyed impressive displays during the 2007/8 season, winning the Lincoln City Player of the Year, Players Player and Website Player of the Year awards. He scored his second Lincoln goal in a 2–1 victory at Morecambe towards the end of the season.

Following The Imps relegation to the Conference National, Green was linked with a move back into league football with Oxford United. However, a few days later Green was not offered a new contract with Lincoln City and released.

=== Tamworth ===
Following his release from The Imps, Green signed for Tamworth following a successful trial. Green made his debut in the season opener away at Barrow.

=== Forest Green Rovers ===
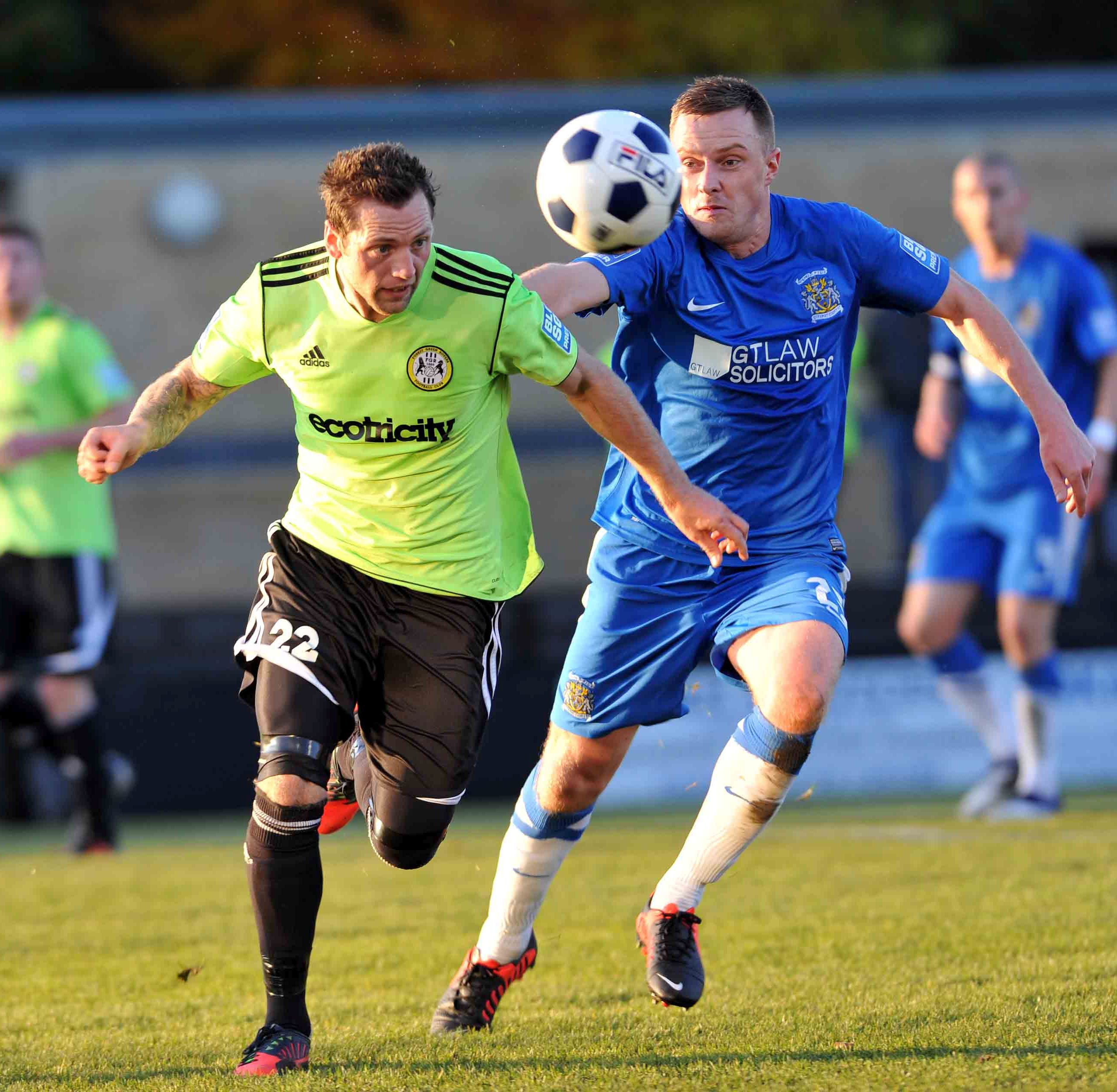
Green playing for Forest Green Rovers during the 2012/13 season.

On 6 July 2012, Paul Green joined Forest Green Rovers on a two-year deal. After suffering an injury in pre-season, Green found his debut delayed as he missed the first two months of the campaign. Green eventually made his Forest Green Rovers debut on 9 October 2012, against the team he had left the following campaign, Tamworth, with his new club been defeated 2–1 at home to his old club. Green settled into the club soon after, and went on to pick up three man-of-the-match awards in his first six games.

Following his return from loan with Hereford United, Green returned to the first team and even netted his first goal for Forest Green Rovers against his former club Lincoln City on 16 November 2013 in a 4–1 win. On 28 April 2014, it was announced that he had been released by the club along with nine other players.

=== Hereford United (loan) ===
On 29 August 2013, Green joined up with Conference National rivals Hereford United on a one-month loan deal. Paul made his Hereford United debut two days later in a 2–1 win over Welling United. After making seven league appearances, his month-long spell with Hereford United came to and end and he returned to Forest Green Rovers.

=== Tamworth ===
It was announced on 8 July 2014 that Paul Green had returned to his former club Tamworth of the Conference North. Following a disappointing start to the season, manager Dale Belford left the club, Green was asked to perform the role of caretaker assistant manager, working alongside Rob Purdie, who took on the role of caretake manager. The pair only led the team for one game, a 1–1 home draw with Colwyn Bay.

=== Solihull Moors ===
On 26 May 2017 Solihull Moors manager Liam McDonald announced that the club had signed Green from Tamworth.

=== Tamworth ===
It was announced on 23 May 2018 that with the expiry of his contract, Paul Green had left Solihull Moors to return to Tamworth in a player-coach capacity.

On 1 March 2019 it was confirmed that Green had departed the club by mutual consent.

== International career ==
Green made eight appearances for the England under-16 side between 2002 and 2003, scoring once. He featured in the Victory Shield, Walkers International Tournament and in the Tournoi de Montaigu.

== Career statistics ==
As of match played 21 November 2017

Appearances and goals by club, season and competition
Club	Season	League			FA Cup		League Cup		Other		Total	
Club	Season	Division	Apps	Goals	Apps	Goals	Apps	Goals	Apps	Goals	Apps	Goals
Lincoln City	2006–07	League Two	15	1	0	0	0	0	2 (Note: Appearances in the League Two play-offs)	0	17	1
Lincoln City	2007–08	League Two	36	1	2	0	1	0	1 (Note: Appearances in the Football League Trophy)	0	40	1
Lincoln City	2008–09	League Two	33	1	2	0	1	0	0	0	36	1
Lincoln City	2009–10	League Two	15	0	1	0	0	0	0	0	16	0
Lincoln City	2010–11	League Two	17	1	1	0	1	0	1	0	20	1
Lincoln City	Total		116	4	6	0	3	0	4	0	129	4
Tamworth	2011–12	Conference Premier	40	0	3	0	—		1 (Note: Appearances in the FA Trophy)	0	44	0
Forest Green Rovers	2012–13	Conference Premier	20	0	2	0	—		0	0	22	0
Forest Green Rovers	2013–14	Conference Premier	23	2	1	0	—		2	0	26	2
Forest Green Rovers	Total		43	2	3	0	0	0	2	0	48	2
Hereford United (loan)	2013–14	Conference Premier	7	0	0	0	—		0	0	7	0
Tamworth	2014–15	Conference North	28	6	2	0	—		0	0	30	6
Tamworth	2015–16	National League North	36	0	0	0	—		0	0	36	0
Tamworth	2016–17	National League North	19	1	0	0	—		0	0	19	1
Tamworth	Total		83	7	2	0	0	0	0	0	85	7
Solihull Moors	2017–18	National League	10	1	2	0	—		0	0	12	1
Career total			294	14	16	0	3	0	7	0	320	14
