= Lee Beevers =

English footballer & cricketer (born 1983)

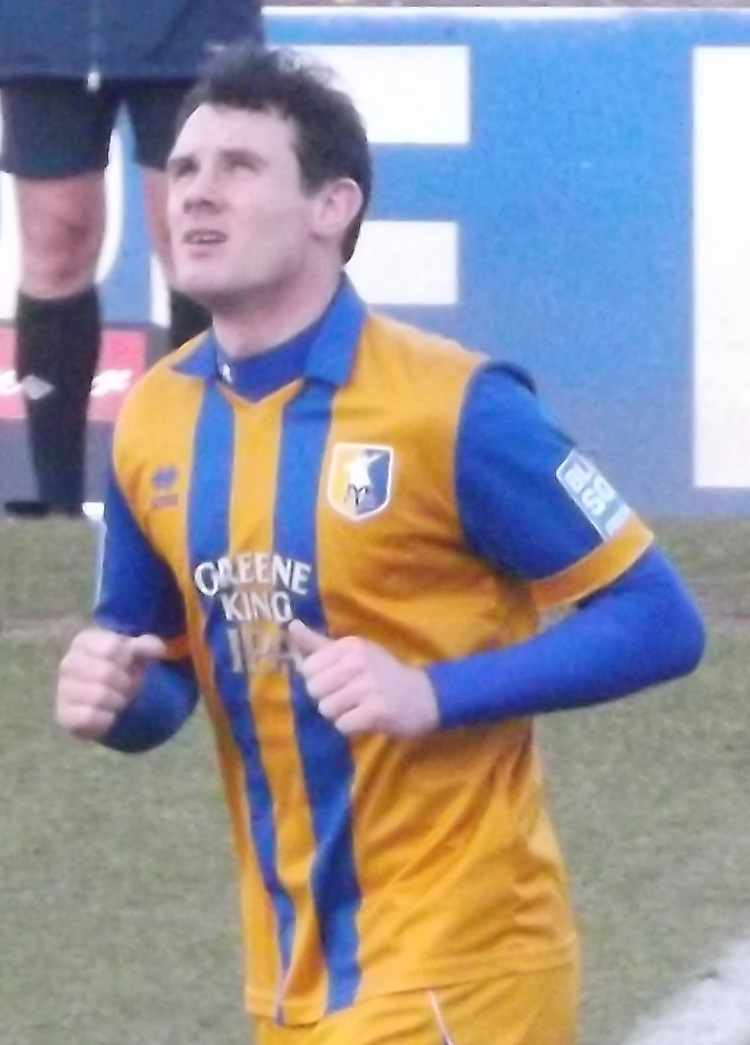
- Beevers playing for Mansfield Town in 2013

Personal information
- Full name: Lee Jonathan Beevers
- Date of birth: 4 December 1983 (age 42)
- Place of birth: Doncaster, England
- Height: 6 ft 1 in (1.85 m)
- Positions: Defender; midfielder

Youth career
- 2000–2001: Ipswich Town

Senior career*
Years	Team	Apps	(Gls)
2001–2003	Ipswich Town	0	(0)
2003	→ Boston United (loan)	1	(0)
2003–2005	Boston United	71	(3)
2004–2009	Lincoln City	166	(9)
2009–2011	Colchester United	23	(0)
2011–2012	Walsall	35	(0)
2012–2015	Mansfield Town	97	(3)
2015–2017	Lincoln City	59	(0)
2018	Gainsborough Trinity	1	(0)
2018	Alfreton Town	12	(0)
2018	King's Lynn Town	0	(0)
2018–2019	Matlock Town	31	(0)
Total		496	(15)

International career
2005	Wales U21	7	(0)
- * Club domestic league appearances and goals

Lee Jonathan Beevers (born 4 December 1983) is a former professional footballer who played as a defender or midfielder. He previously had spells with Ipswich Town, Boston United, Lincoln City, Colchester United, Walsall and Mansfield Town. Born in England, he made seven appearances for the Wales U21 national team.

== Career ==
=== Ipswich Town ===
Beevers was spotted by Ipswich Town scout Sonny Sweeney while playing in his hometown of Doncaster and began commuting to Ipswich at weekends to represent the club's School of Excellence, joining the club on a full-time basis as a scholar in July 2000 and signing his first professional contract in March 2001. On 22 January 2003, Beevers and fellow young professional Steve Burton were told by Ipswich's manager Joe Royle that their contracts would not be renewed at the end of the season and that they were free to seek new clubs. The following week, Beevers joined Boston United on trial appearing for the club's reserve team in a 3–0 victory over Lincoln City's reserve team on 29 January 2003. In February 2003 he joined Colchester United on trial but he did not earn a contract from the club and returned to Portman Road. On 26 March 2003 Beevers and fellow Ipswich Town youngster Robert Dickinson joined Boston United on loan until the end of the season. Having been an unused substitute for the 2–1 home victory over Macclesfield Town on 26 April 2003, he made his Football League debut as an 82nd-minute substitute for Peter Costello in the 2–1 victory at Cambridge United on 3 May 2003.

=== Boston United ===
On 9 June 2003, Beevers agreed a one-year contract to join Boston United on a full-time basis. His performances at Boston earned him numerous awards whilst at the club, and also got the attention of the Welsh national team, where he has represented his country at Under-21 level.

Beevers can play anywhere along the defensive line, however, his most adept position is right-back. Beevers has also demonstrated that he is capable of playing as a right-sided wing-back and in front of the defensive line as both a defensive midfielder and a central midfielder too.

=== Lincoln City ===
His performances at Lincoln have earned him the respect of the fans, as his performances at Boston did for their fans. In the 2005–06 season, he played an important role in the team, however, due to the teams tactical system back then, he occasionally got scrutinised for mistakes. Thus far in the 2006–07 season, he has adapted to the new tactical system employed by new Head Coach Peter Jackson, and his form in various positions on the pitch has meant that he has been an ever-present in the squad.

=== Colchester United ===
On 24 June 2009 he agreed to join Football League One outfit Colchester United on a two-year contract.

Despite starting the first few games relatively brightly for Colchester United under then manager Paul Lambert, Beevers sustained an injury to his shoulder during a competitive match against Milton Keynes Dons. This resulted in him missing three months of the season, over which period he was plagued by other smaller injuries postponing his return to action. Due to his long absence and lack of fitness, he failed to make an impact in the 2009–10 season and didn't manage to break back into the starting line-up, only making a handful of substitution appearances.

Beevers started pre season in a new holding midfield role where he impressed enough to earn himself a sub appearance at Exeter. Despite making a handful of appearances, mainly from the bench, in 2010–11, he was released from his contract on 10 May 2011 and the U's continued shaping their squad for the new season.

=== Walsall ===
Beevers signed a one-year contract with Walsall on 14 July 2011.

=== Mansfield Town ===
After one season with Walsall, Beevers signed for Mansfield Town on a one-year contract. After making over 40 appearances and helping the club to the 2012–13 Conference National title, it was announced that Mansfield would be renewing Beevers' contract. He was released from the Stags on 6 May 2015.

=== Return to Lincoln City ===
On 14 May 2015 Beevers returned to Lincoln City, signing a two-year contract following his release from Mansfield Town. He made his second debut in a 1–1 draw with Cheltenham Town in the National League.

=== Later career ===
After temporarily retiring from the professional game, Beevers signed for Gainsborough Trinity on 5 January 2018, having been training with the club since the summer of 2017. After just one appearance with Trinity, Beevers joined Alfreton Town as a player/first team coach.

In July 2018, Beevers signed for King's Lynn Town as player/assistant manager. He signed for Matlock Town in September 2018.

== Career statistics ==
=== Club ===
Appearances and goals by club, season and competition
Club	Season	League			FA Cup		League Cup		Other		Total	
Club	Season	Division	Apps	Goals	Apps	Goals	Apps	Goals	Apps	Goals	Apps	Goals
Ipswich Town	2002–03	First Division	0	0	0	0	0	0	—		0	0
Boston United	2002–03 (Note: This season was spent on loan from Ipswich Town)	Third Division	1	0	0	0	0	0	0	0	1	0
Boston United	2003–04	Third Division	40	2	1	0	0	0	2 (Note: Appearances in Football League Trophy)	1	43	3
Boston United	2004–05	League Two	31	1	4	0	2	1	1	0	38	2
Boston United	Total		72	3	5	0	2	1	3	1	82	5
Lincoln City	2004–05	League Two	8	0	0	0	0	0	2 (Note: Appearances in League Two play-offs)	0	10	0
Lincoln City	2005–06	League Two	33	1	2	0	2	1	3 (Note: One appearance in Football League Trophy, two appearances in League Two play-offs)	0	40	2
Lincoln City	2006–07	League Two	44	5	1	0	1	1	3	0	49	6
Lincoln City	2007–08	League Two	37	1	0	0	0	0	1	0	38	1
Lincoln City	2008–09	League Two	44	2	2	0	1	0	1	0	48	2
Lincoln City	Total		166	9	5	0	4	2	10	0	185	11
Colchester United	2009–10	League One	4	0	0	0	1	0	0	0	5	0
Colchester United	2010–11	League One	19	0	1	0	1	0	0	0	21	0
Colchester United	Total		23	0	1	0	2	0	0	0	26	0
Walsall	2011–12	League One	35	0	4	0	0	0	1	0	40	0
Mansfield Town	2012–13	Conference Premier	36	1	5	0	—		0	0	41	1
Mansfield Town	2013–14	League Two	26	0	0	0	1	0	1	0	28	0
Mansfield Town	2014–15	League Two	35	2	4	0	1	0	1	0	41	2
Mansfield Town	Total		97	3	9	0	2	0	2	0	110	3
Lincoln City	2015–16	National League	44	0	3	0	—		0	0	47	0
Lincoln City	2016–17	National League	15	0	2	0	—		0	0	17	0
Lincoln City	Total		59	0	5	0	—		0	0	64	0
Gainsborough Trinity	2017–18	National League North	1	0	0	0	—		0	0	1	0
Alfreton Town	2017–18	National League North	12	0	0	0	—		0	0	12	0
King's Lynn Town	2018–19	Southern League Premier Division Central	0	0	0	0	—		0	0	0	0
Matlock Town	2018–19	Northern Premier League Premier Division	31	0	0	0	—		2 (Note: Appearances in Derbyshire Senior Cup)	0	33	0
Career total			496	15	29	0	10	3	18	1	553	19

== Football Honours ==
Mansfield Town

- Conference Premier: 2012–13

Lincoln City

- National League: 2016–17

Individual

- Lincoln City Player of the Season: 2006–07
