= Stefan Oakes =

English footballer (born 1978)

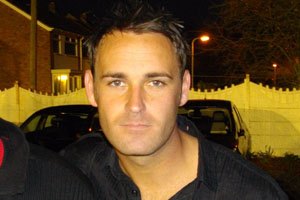
- Oakes in 2010

Personal information
- Full name: Stefan Trevor Oakes
- Date of birth: 6 September 1978 (age 48)
- Place of birth: Leicester, England
- Height: 5 ft 11 in (1.80 m)
- Position: Midfielder

Youth career
- 1997–1998: Leicester City

Senior career*
Years	Team	Apps	(Gls)
1998–2003	Leicester City	64	(2)
2002	→ Crewe Alexandra (loan)	7	(0)
2003	Walsall	5	(0)
2003–2005	Notts County	45	(5)
2005–2008	Wycombe Wanderers	110	(5)
2008–2010	Lincoln City	43	(1)
2010	Tamworth	10	(0)
2010	F.C. New York	1	(0)
2011	Tamworth	1	(0)
2013	Oadby Town	9	(0)
Total		295	(13)
- * Club domestic league appearances and goals

Stefan Trevor Oakes (born 6 September 1978) is an English former professional footballer who played as a midfielder. He notably represented Leicester City in the Premier League during a career which began in 1998 and ended in 2013.

== Career ==
=== Leicester City ===
Oakes was born in Leicester. A left-footed midfielder, he began his career at Leicester City. Given his debut as a substitute in a 4–2 defeat to Chelsea at Filbert Street at the age of 19, he represented Leicester in the 2000 League Cup final at Wembley Stadium.

Oakes was released by manager Micky Adams on 4 March 2003.

=== Walsall ===
Following his release by Leicester, Oakes opted to join Walsall.

=== Notts County ===
He then moved to Notts County but, despite being a regular starter and fans' favourite at the club, he rejected the offer of a new contract in the summer of 2005 and moved to their League Two rivals, Wycombe Wanderers.

=== Wycombe Wanderers ===
Oakes spent three seasons with Wycombe, making a total of 96 appearances in League Two and scoring five goals.

=== Lincoln City ===
On 9 June 2008, Oakes agreed to join Lincoln City on a two-year contract, after declining a new contract offer at Wycombe Wanderers.

On 29 May 2009, following the signing of Richard Butcher, Oakes was told that he was free to leave Lincoln City by Imps' boss Peter Jackson. He departed Sincil Bank on 30 March 2010 after agreeing to cancel his contract with the club.

=== Tamworth ===
Following his release from Lincoln City, Oakes undertook pre-season trials with both Mansfield Town and Halesowen Town before signing for Conference National side Tamworth on 11 August 2010.

=== Move to F.C. New York ===
On 20 December 2010, it was announced that Oakes was leaving Tamworth to pursue a playing and coaching career in the United States at F.C. New York.

=== Return to England ===
On 5 January 2013, it was announced that Oakes had signed for United Counties League side Oadby Town .

He left Oadby in April 2013, to resume his coaching career in the United States.

== Personal life ==
Oakes' brother Scott was also a professional footballer. Their father Trevor Oakes was a guitarist in the band Showaddywaddy.

== Career statistics ==
Appearances and goals by club, season and competition
Club	Season	League			National cup (Note: Includes FA Cup.)		League cup (Note: Includes League Cup.)		Continental		Total	
Club	Season	Division	Apps	Goals	Apps	Goals	Apps	Goals	Apps	Goals	Apps	Goals
Leicester City	1998–99	Premier League	3	0	0	0	0	0	0	0	3	0
Leicester City	1999–2000	Premier League	22	1	3	0	7	2	0	0	32	3
Leicester City	2000–01	Premier League	13	0	3	0	0	0	0	0	16	0
Leicester City	2001–02	Premier League	21	1	1	0	0	0	0	0	22	1
Leicester City	2002–03	First Division	5	0	0	0	1	0	0	0	6	0
Leicester City	Total		64	2	7	0	8	2	0	0	79	4
Crewe Alexandra (loan)	2002–03	Second Division	7	0	0	0	0	0	0	0	7	0
Walsall	2003–04	First Division	5	0	0	0	0	0	0	0	5	0
Notts County	2003–04	Second Division	14	0	0	0	0	0	0	0	14	0
Notts County	2004–05	League Two	31	5	3	1	1	0	0	0	35	6
Notts County	Total		45	5	3	1	1	0	0	0	49	6
Wycombe Wanderers	2005–06	League Two	39	2	1	0	2	0	0	0	42	2
Wycombe Wanderers	2006–07	League Two	35	0	2	1	3	2	0	0	40	3
Wycombe Wanderers	2007–08	League Two	36	3	1	0	1	1	0	0	38	4
Wycombe Wanderers	Total		110	5	4	1	6	3	0	0	120	9
Lincoln City	2008–09	League Two	28	1	1	0	1	0	0	0	30	1
Lincoln City	2009–10	League Two	15	0	0	0	1	0	0	0	16	0
Lincoln City	Total		43	1	1	0	2	0	0	0	46	1
Tamworth	2010–11	Conference National	10	0	4	0	0	0	0	0	14	0
Tamworth	2011–12	Conference National	1	0	0	0	0	0	0	0	1	0
Tamworth	Total		11	0	4	0	0	0	0	0	15	0
Oadby Town	2012–13	United Counties League Division One	9	0	0	0	0	0	0	0	9	0
Career total			294	13	19	2	17	5	0	0	330	20

== Honours ==
Leicester City

- Football League Cup: 1999–2000
