= 2007–08 Accrington Stanley F.C. season =

Accrington Stanley
2007–08 season
- Manager: John Coleman
- Stadium: Crown Ground
- League Two: 17th
- FA Cup: First round
- Football League Cup: First round
- Johnstones Paint Trophy: First round

This page shows the progress of Accrington Stanley F.C. in the 2007–08 football season. During the season, Accrington Stanley competed in League Two in the English league system.

== League table ==
Pos	Team	Pld	W	D	L	GF	GA	GD	Pts
15	Lincoln City	46	18	4	24	61	77	−16	58
16	Grimsby Town	46	15	10	21	55	66	−11	55
17	Accrington Stanley	46	16	3	27	49	83	−34	51
18	Shrewsbury Town	46	12	14	20	56	65	−9	50
19	Macclesfield Town	46	11	17	18	47	64	−17	50

Updated to match(es) played on 3 May 2008. Source: The Football League
Rules for classification: 1) points; 2) goal difference; 3) number of goals scored.

== Results ==
=== Football League Two ===
11 August 2007 1	Wycombe Wanderers	0–1	Accrington Stanley	High Wycombe
			Mullin 58'	Stadium: Adams Park; Attendance: 4,408

18 August 2007 2	Accrington Stanley	0–3	Darlington	Accrington
			Wright 26'; Abbott 49', 90' (pen.)	Stadium: Crown Ground; Attendance: 1,805

25 August 2007 3	Lincoln City	2–0	Accrington Stanley	Lincoln
	N'Guessan 31'; Dodds 66'			Stadium: Sincil Bank; Attendance: 3,189

1 September 2007 4	Accrington Stanley	0–2	Peterborough United	Accrington
	McEvilly (red card) 63'; Branch (red card) 90'		Lee 55'; McLean 90'	Stadium: Crown Ground; Attendance: 1,484

8 September 2007 5	Accrington Stanley	4–1	Grimsby Town	Accrington
	Procter 29' (pen.), 90'; Mullin 48', 69'		Bolland 57'	Stadium: Crown Ground; Attendance: 1,350

15 September 2007 6	Shrewsbury Town	2–0	Accrington Stanley	Shrewsbury
	Nicholson 3'; Hibbert 52' (pen.)		Harris (red card) 52'	Stadium: New Meadow; Attendance: 5,789

22 September 2007 7	Accrington Stanley	1–0	Mansfield Town	Accrington
	Mullin 26'			Stadium: Crown Ground; Attendance: 1,408

29 September 2007 8	Bury	2–1	Accrington Stanley	Bury
	Mangan 71'; Adams 84'		Mullin 48'	Stadium: Gigg Lane; Attendance: 2,784

2 October 2007 9	Bradford City	0–3	Accrington Stanley	Bradford
			Dsane 2', 32'; Procter 61'	Stadium: Coral Windows Stadium; Attendance: 13,346

5 October 2007 10	Accrington Stanley	0–2	Wrexham	Accrington
			Roberts 37', 66'	Stadium: Crown Ground; Attendance: 1,822

14 October 2007 11	Dagenham & Redbridge	1–3	Accrington Stanley	London
	Cavanagh 26' (o.g.)		McGivern 16'; Procter 27'; Mullin 78'	Stadium: Victoria Road; Attendance: 1,596

19 October 2007 12	Accrington Stanley	3–2	Macclesfield Town	Accrington
	Dsane 51', 74'; Mullin 54'		McIntyre 71' (pen.); Evans 73'	Stadium: Crown Ground; Attendance: 1,792

27 October 2007 13	Barnet	2–2	Accrington Stanley	London
	Hatch 59'; Burton 70'		Craney 51'; DSane 83'	Stadium: Underhill; Attendance: 2,178

3 November 2007 14	Accrington Stanley	0–2	Notts County	Accrington
			Lindfield 23'; Dudfield 87'	Stadium: Crown Ground; Attendance: 1,722

6 November 2007 15	Morecambe	0–1	Accrington Stanley	Morecambe
			Cresswell 13' (o.g.)	Stadium: Christie Park; Attendance: 2,814

17 November 2007 16	Accrington Stanley	0–1	Rotherham United	Accrington
			Hudson 52'	Stadium: Crown Ground; Attendance: 1,918

24 November 2007 17	Hereford United	0–0	Accrington Stanley	Hereford
				Stadium: Edgar Street; Attendance: 2,804

5 December 2007 18	Accrington Stanley	1–2	Rochdale	Accrington
	Craney 23'		Perkins (red card) 20'; Higginbotham 56'; Murray 75'	Stadium: Crown Ground; Attendance: 1,621

8 December 2007 19	Milton Keynes Dons	5–0	Accrington Stanley	Milton Keynes
	Andrews 9'; Navarro 25'; Cameron 33'; Dyer 49', 77'			Stadium: Stadium:MK; Attendance: 6,917

15 December 2007 20	Accrington Stanley	2–1	Chesterfield	Accrington
	Procter 74' (pen.); Dsane 89'		Ward 18'	Stadium: Crown Ground; Attendance: 1,448

22 December 2007 21	Accrington Stanley	1–2	Shrewsbury Town	Accrington
	Mullin 39'		Davies 64'; Hibbert 68'	Stadium: Crown Ground; Attendance: 1,410

26 December 2007 22	Grimsby Town	1–2	Accrington Stanley	Grimsby
	Hegarty 8'		Mullin 48'; Procter 58'	Stadium: Blundell Park; Attendance: 4,240

29 December 2007 23	Mansfield Town	1–2	Accrington Stanley	Mansfield
	Holmes 90'; McIntosh (red card) 90'		Mullin 75'; Procter 90' (pen.)	Stadium: Field Mill; Attendance: 2,494

1 January 2008 24	Accrington Stanley	0–2	Bradford City	Accrington
			Clarke 47'; Colbeck 90'	Stadium: Crown Ground; Attendance: 2,898

5 January 2008 25	Accrington Stanley	3–3	Chester City	Accrington
	Procter 37'; Craney 63'; Dsane 74'		Holroyd 9', 78'; Wilson 68'	Stadium: Crown Ground; Attendance: 1,311

12 January 2008 26	Stockport County	2–0	Accrington Stanley	Stockport
	Rose 3'; Elding 45'			Stadium: Edgeley Park; Attendance: 4,714

15 January 2008 27	Peterborough United	8–2	Accrington Stanley	Peterborough
	Mackail-Smith 12', 89'; Boyd 27', 33', 76'; McLean 39', 78', 82'		Mullin 46'; Whalley 62'	Stadium: London Road; Attendance: 4,257

29 January 2008 28	Darlington	1–0	Accrington Stanley	Darlington
	Wright 1'			Stadium: The Darlington Arena; Attendance: 2,808

2 February 2008 29	Accrington Stanley	0–2	Wycombe Wanderers	Accrington
			McGleish 13'; Knight 75'	Stadium: Crown Ground; Attendance: 1,200

9 February 2008 30	Chester City	2–3	Accrington Stanley	Chester
	Butler 20'; Murphy 34'		Thomas 14', 68'; Craney 90'	Stadium: Deva Stadium; Attendance: 1,957

12 February 2008 31	Accrington Stanley	0–3	Lincoln City	Accrington
			Stallard 6'; Wright 70'; Beevers 75'	Stadium: Crown Ground; Attendance: 1,281

16 February 2008 32	Brentford	3–1	Accrington Stanley	London
	Poole 34'; Heywood 44'; Connell 63'		Craney 39'	Stadium: Griffin Park; Attendance: 4,635

23 February 2008 33	Accrington Stanley	0–2	Stockport County	Accrington
			Dickinson 33', 63'	Stadium: Crown Ground; Attendance: 2,576

26 February 2008 34	Accrington Stanley	1–0	Brentford	Accrington
	Richardson 31'			Stadium: Crown Ground; Attendance: 1,149

1 March 2008 35	Rotherham United	0–1	Accrington Stanley	Rotherham
			Craney 64'	Stadium: Millmoor; Attendance: 3,683

8 March 2008 36	Accrington Stanley	0–2	Hereford United	Accrington
			Hooper 43'; Roberts 52' (o.g.)	Stadium: Crown Ground; Attendance: 1,262

12 March 2008 37	Accrington Stanley	3–2	Morecambe	Accrington
	Kempson 43'; Mangan 72'; Mullin 73'		Blinkhorn 14'; Twiss 50'	Stadium: Crown Ground; Attendance: 1,448

16 March 2008 38	Rochdale	4–1	Accrington Stanley	Rochdale
	Le Fondre 45' (pen.), 65', 83'; Jones 48'		Whalley 34'	Stadium: Spotland; Attendance: 3,247

22 March 2008 39	Chesterfield	4–2	Accrington Stanley	Chesterfield
	Niven 31'; Roberts 58' (o.g.); Lowry 59'; Ward 85'		Procter 23', 31' (pen.)	Stadium: Saltergate; Attendance: 3,274

24 March 2008 40	Accrington Stanley	0–1	Milton Keynes Dons	Accrington
			Wright 83'	Stadium: Crown Ground; Attendance: 1,559

29 March 2008 41	Macclesfield Town	2–1	Accrington Stanley	Macclesfield
	Brisley 15', 38'		Craney 31'; Thomas (red card) 70'	Stadium: Moss Rose; Attendance: 1,853

4 April 2008 42	Accrington Stanley	1–0	Dagenham & Redbridge	Accrington
	Edwards 47'; Richardson (red card) 90'			Stadium: Crown Ground; Attendance: 1,262

12 April 2008 43	Notts County	1–0	Accrington Stanley	Nottingham
	Jarvis 37'			Stadium: Meadow Lane; Attendance: 5,525

19 April 2008 44	Accrington Stanley	0–2	Barnet	Accrington
			Bishop 54'; Leary 82'	Stadium: Crown Ground; Attendance: 1,288

26 April 2008 45	Wrexham	1–3	Accrington Stanley	Wrexham
	Roberts 90' (pen.)		Pejic 7' (o.g.); Cavanagh 28'; Whalley 72'	Stadium: Racecourse Ground; Attendance: 3,657

3 May 2008 46	Accrington Stanley	0–2	Bury	Accrington
			Bishop 22' (pen.), 54'	Stadium: Crown Ground; Attendance: 2,566

=== FA Cup ===
10 November 2007 Round 1	Accrington Stanley	2–3	Huddersfield Town	Accrington
	Cavanagh 12'; Mullin 25'		Kamara 45', 83'; Beckett 89'	Stadium: Crown Ground; Attendance: 2,202

=== League Cup ===
12 August 2007 Round 1	Accrington Stanley	0–1	Leicester City	Accrington
			Wesolowski 4'	Stadium: Crown Ground; Attendance: 2,029

=== Football League Trophy ===
4 September 2007 Northern Section Round 1	Accrington Stanley	2–3	Oldham Athletic	Accrington
	Dsane 8'; Procter 29' (pen.)		Liddell 55'; Davies 56'; Wolfenden 73'	Stadium: Crown Ground; Attendance: 1,465

== Players ==
=== First-team squad ===
Includes all players who were awarded squad numbers during the season.

Note: Flags indicate national team as defined under FIFA eligibility rules; some limited exceptions apply. Players may hold more than one non-FIFA nationality.

No.	Pos.	Nation	Player
1	GK	SCO	Kenny Arthur
2	DF	ENG	Peter Cavanagh
3	DF	ENG	Leam Richardson
4	DF	ENG	Robbie Williams
5	DF	NIR	Mark Roberts
6	MF	ENG	Andrew Procter
7	MF	ENG	Shaun Whalley
8	MF	ENG	Jay Harris
10	FW	ENG	Paul Mullin
11	FW	ENG	John Miles
12	DF	ENG	Phil Edwards
15	FW	ENG	Lee McEvilly
16	MF	ENG	Paul Carden
17	DF	ENG	Graham Branch
18	FW	ENG	David Brown

No.	Pos.	Nation	Player
19	FW	ENG	Leighton McGivern
20	DF	ENG	Jay Bell
21	DF	NIR	Seán Webb
22	MF	ENG	Bobby Grant
23	MF	ENG	Ian Craney
24	FW	ENG	Andrew Smith
25	GK	ENG	Ian Dunbavin
26	GK	ENG	Martin Fearon
27	FW	ENG	Andy Todd (on loan from Rotherham United)
28	DF	ENG	Mark King
30	MF	ENG	David Mannix
31	DF	ENG	Aswad Thomas (on loan from Charlton Athletic)
32	FW	ENG	Chris Turner
40	GK	ENG	Peter Murphy

=== Left club during season ===
Note: Flags indicate national team as defined under FIFA eligibility rules; some limited exceptions apply. Players may hold more than one non-FIFA nationality.

No.	Pos.	Nation	Player
20	FW	ENG	Chris McGrail (returned to parent club Preston North End following loan spell)
9	FW	ENG	Roscoe D'sane (signed for Torquay United on 25 January 2008)
24	MF	IRL	Billy Dennehy (returned to parent club Sunderland following loan spell)
14	MF	FRA	Romuald Boco (returned to parent club Tranmere Rovers following loan spell)

No.	Pos.	Nation	Player
29	MF	ENG	Phil Doughty (returned to parent club Blackpool following loan spell)
33	FW	ENG	Andy Mangan (returned to parent club Bury following loan spell)
14	DF	ENG	Darran Kempson (returned to parent club Shrewsbury Town following loan spell)
