= 2006–07 Accrington Stanley F.C. season =

Accrington Stanley
2006–07 season
- Manager: John Coleman
- Stadium: Crown Ground
- League Two: 20th
- FA Cup: First round
- League Cup: Second round
- Football League Trophy: Quarter-finals
- Top goalscorer: Paul Mullin (13)
- Average home league attendance: 2,260

During the 2006–07 English football season, Accrington Stanley competed in Football League Two.

== Season summary ==
Stanley scored 70 league goals during which they were involved in a relegation battle for most of the season, but a run of 5 wins in their last 9 games allowed them to secure safety in 20th place, their highlight of the season being a 5–0 thumping of then-promotion-favourites Wrexham. More success came in the cups. In Stanley's first ever game in the Football League Cup, third-tier Nottingham Forest were beaten 1–0. This set an away tie to Premier League team Watford, who needed a penalty shootout to eliminate the Lancashire club. The club also performed well in the Football League trophy, reaching the area quarter-finals before being eliminated by Doncaster Rovers.

== First-team squad ==
Squad at end of season

Note: Flags indicate national team as defined under FIFA eligibility rules; some limited exceptions apply. Players may hold more than one non-FIFA nationality.

No.	Pos.	Nation	Player
2	DF	(England) ENG	Peter Cavanagh
3	DF	(England) ENG	Leam Richardson
4	DF	(England) ENG	Robbie Williams
5	DF	(England) ENG	Michael Welch
6	MF	(England) ENG	Andrew Procter
7	MF	(England) ENG	Sean Doherty
9	FW	(England) ENG	Andy Mangan
10	FW	(England) ENG	Paul Mullin
12	DF	(England) ENG	Phil Edwards
14	MF	(Benin) BEN	Romuald Boco (Note: Boco was born in Bernay, France, but also qualified to represent Benin internationally and made his international debut for Benin in 2004.)
15	MF	(England) ENG	Danny Ventre
17	MF	(England) ENG	Andy Todd
18	FW	(England) ENG	David Brown
20	MF	(England) ENG	Jay Harris
25	GK	(England) ENG	Ian Dunbavin

No.	Pos.	Nation	Player
26	MF	(England) ENG	Shaun Whalley
27	FW	(England) ENG	Leighton McGivern
32	FW	(England) ENG	Andrew Smith
33	FW	(England) ENG	Jimmy Bell
34	DF	(England) ENG	Peter Murphy
35	GK	(England) ENG	Martin Fearon
36	DF	(England) ENG	Alan Rogers
38	DF	(Portugal) POR	Mauro Almeida
39	FW	(Wales) WAL	Stuart Fleetwood (Note: Fleetwood was born in Gloucester, England, but also qualified to represent Wales internationally through his father and has represented them at under-17 and under-21 level.) (on loan from Hereford United)
40	MF	(England) ENG	Tony Grant
41	GK	(Poland) POL	Przemysław Kazimierczak (on loan from Bolton Wanderers)
41	GK	(England) ENG	David Martin (on loan from Liverpool)
41	DF	(Spain) ESP	Godwin Antwi (Note: Antwi was born in Kumasi, Ghana, but was raised in Spain from the age of 14 and represented them at U-19 level.) (on loan from Liverpool)
41	MF	(England) ENG	Bobby Grant

=== Left club during season ===
Note: Flags indicate national team as defined under FIFA eligibility rules; some limited exceptions apply. Players may hold more than one non-FIFA nationality.

No.	Pos.	Nation	Player
1	GK	(Republic of Ireland) IRL	Rob Elliot (Note: Elliot was born in Greenwich, England, but also qualifies to represent the Republic of Ireland internationally through his father and represented them at under-19 level before making his international debut for the Republic of Ireland in May 2014.) (on loan from Charlton Athletic)
8	MF	(England) ENG	Ian Craney (to Swansea City)
11	MF	(England) ENG	Gary Roberts (to Ipswich Town)
16	DF	(France) FRA	Julien N'Da (released)
19	DF	(England) ENG	Andrew Tretton (retired)
21	DF	(England) ENG	Ashley Foyle (to Belper Town)
22	MF	(England) ENG	Joel Byrom (released)

No.	Pos.	Nation	Player
23	GK	(France) FRA	François Dubourdeau (released)
24	DF	(England) ENG	Rikki Bains (to Tamworth)
28	DF	(Wales) WAL	Joe Jacobson (on loan from Cardiff City)
29	MF	(England) ENG	David Mannix (on loan from Liverpool)
30	DF	(Wales) WAL	Curtis McDonald (on loan from Cardiff City)
31	DF	(England) ENG	Adam Dugdale (on loan from Crewe Alexandra)
37	DF	(England) ENG	Chris McGrail (on loan from Preston North End)

== Results ==
=== League Two ===
5 August 2006 1	Chester City	2–0	Accrington Stanley	Deva Stadium
15:00	Broughton 15'; Blundell 86'	Report		Attendance: 3,779

8 August 2006 2	Accrington Stanley	0–2	Darlington	Crown Ground
19:45		Report	Cummins 33'; Smith 43'	Attendance: 2,667

12 August 2006 3	Accrington Stanley	2–1	Barnet	Crown Ground
15:00	Boco 35', 53'	Report	King 89'	Attendance: 1,639

18 August 2006 4	Stockport County	1–1	Accrington Stanley	Edgeley Park
19:45	Murray 12'	Report	Welch 78'	Attendance: 5,291

26 August 2006 5	Accrington Stanley	1–1	Rochdale	Crown Ground
15:00	Roberts 76' (pen.)	Report	Dagnall 20'	Attendance: 3,045

1 September 2006 6	Lincoln City	3–1	Accrington Stanley	Sincil Bank
19:45	Gritton 6'; Stallard 40', 69'	Report	Roberts 82'	Attendance: 4,999

9 September 2006 7	Notts County	3–2	Accrington Stanley	Meadow Lane
15:00	Edwards 11'; Martin 29', 36'	Report	Roberts 90+1'; Mullin 90+3'	Attendance: 4,677

13 September 2006 8	Accrington Stanley	5–0	Wrexham	Crown Ground
19:45	Mullin 41'; Craney 49'; Roberts 52', 67'; Cavanagh 55'	Report		Attendance: 2,689

16 September 2006 9	Accrington Stanley	2–1	Boston United	Crown Ground
15:00	Roberts 11'; Todd 90+1'	Report	Farrell 49'	Attendance: 1,916

23 September 2006 10	Mansfield Town	2–2	Accrington Stanley	Field Mill
15:00	Hamshaw 58'; Boulding 81'	Report	Mullin 16', 85'	Attendance: 3,088

26 September 2006 11	Bury	2–2	Accrington Stanley	Gigg Lane
19:45	Bishop 7', 36'	Report	Roberts 12'; Boco 37'	Attendance: 2,912

30 September 2006 12	Accrington Stanley	2–1	Wycombe Wanderers	Crown Ground
15:00	Craney 27'; Mangan 90+2'	Report	Antwi 55'	Attendance: 2,243

7 October 2006 13	Accrington Stanley	1–1	Swindon Town	Crown Ground
15:00	Todd 33'	Report	Peacock 67'	Attendance: 3,083

14 October 2006 14	Torquay United	0–2	Accrington Stanley	Plainmoor
15:00		Report	Welch 47'; Roberts 73'	Attendance: 2,743

21 October 2006 15	Accrington Stanley	1–2	Walsall	Crown Ground
15:00	Craney 78'		Sam 40'; Wright 85'	Attendance: 3,142

28 October 2006 16	Hereford United	1–0	Accrington Stanley	Edgar Street
15:00	Connell 85'	Report		Attendance: 3,391

4 November 2006 17	Peterborough United	4–2	Accrington Stanley	London Road
15:00	Benjamin 57'; Crow 58', 88'; McLean 60'	Report	Craney 23', 79'	Attendance: 3,990

18 November 2006 18	Accrington Stanley	1–2	Hartlepool United	Crown Ground
15:00	Todd 38'	Report	Williams 75'; Humphreys 90+1'	Attendance: 1,787

25 November 2006 19	Grimsby Town	2–0	Accrington Stanley	Blundell Park
15:00	Paterson 12'; Jones 56'	Report		Attendance: 4,511

2 December 2006 20	Accrington Stanley	3–3	Shrewsbury Town	Crown Ground
15:00	Todd 19'; Edwards 55'; Williams 89'	Report	Asamoah 4'; Fortune-West 40'; Symes 84'	Attendance: 1,602
