= Andrew Procter =

English footballer (born 1983)

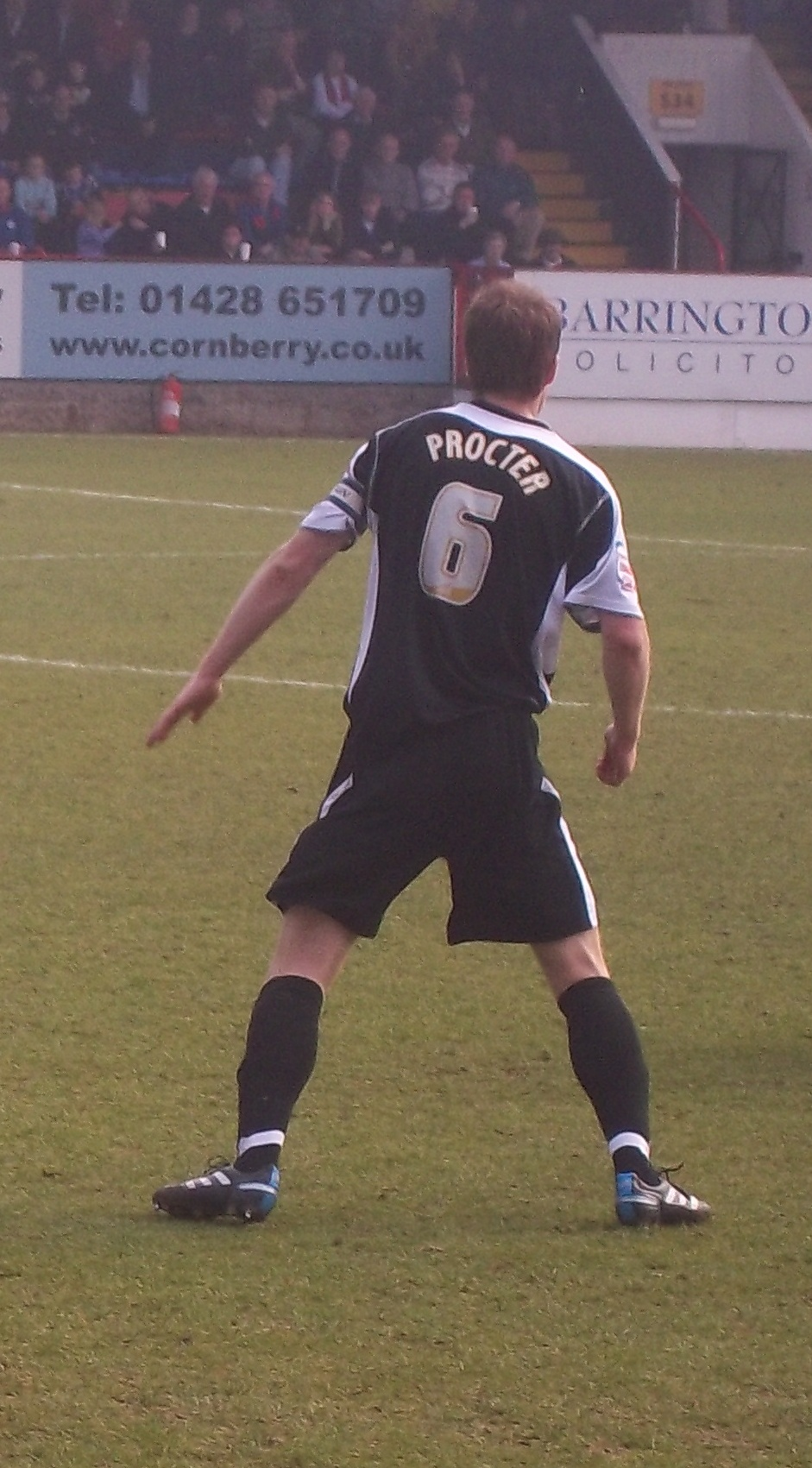
- Procter with Accrington Stanley

Personal information
- Full name: Andrew John Procter
- Date of birth: 13 June 1983 (age 43)
- Place of birth: Blackburn, England
- Height: 6 ft 0 in (1.83 m)
- Position: Midfielder

Team information
- Current team: Nelson

Youth career
- Preston North End

Senior career*
Years	Team	Apps	(Gls)
2000–2002	Great Harwood Town		
2002–2012	Accrington Stanley	349	(38)
2012–2013	Preston North End	33	(0)
2013–2014	Bury	32	(2)
2014–2016	Accrington Stanley	40	(0)
2022–2023	Clitheroe	2	(0)
2024–	Nelson	8	(0)

International career
2004	England National Game XI	1	(0)
- * Club domestic league appearances and goals

Andrew John Procter (born 13 March 1983) is an English former professional footballer who played as a midfielder. He made one appearance for the England C national team.

== Club career ==
=== Early career ===
Procter was born in Blackburn, Lancashire and attended St Gabriel's C of E Primary School in the town before later attending Clitheroe Royal Grammar School. He first started playing as a seven year-old for local side Langho Juniors and later played as a schoolboy at English Football League side Preston North End. He started playing senior football at Great Harwood Town in the North West Counties Football League Division One.

=== Accrington Stanley ===
He was spotted by Accrington Stanley manager, John Coleman, whilst playing for Great Harwood against St Helens Town in February 2002 and a week later he was invited to a meeting with Coleman and the Chairman at a hotel in Rishton. He signed a contract with the Northern Premier League Premier Division side which was "enough to put me through university. Accrington won a treble of cups in the remainder of the 2001–02 season, firstly winning the Northern Premier League Challenge Cup with Procter scoring in the penalty shoot-out victory over Bradford (Park Avenue) after a two-legged affair ended in stalemate. A fortnight later they then won the Lancashire FA Challenge Trophy final, beating Barrow 2–0 at Christie Park. Finally, a week later, they won the Northern Premier League Challenge Shield, again on penalties, with Procter scoring in the shoot-out against Burton Albion.

In the following 2002–03 season, Accrington romped to the title with a record-breaking 100 points and 97 goals scored, which earned promotion to the Football Conference. Stanley also sealed a cup double when they retained the Northern Premier League Challenge Shield with a 2–0 win over Marine in the final game of the season. He scored on his Conference debut on 10 August 2003, in a 2–1 away defeat to Aldershot Town which was broadcast on live TV. Procter became an integral part of the side, making 39 league appearances as they finished in mid-table but had a record breaking-run in the FA Cup, beating Third Division side Huddersfield Town and Second Division side AFC Bournemouth to make it to the 3rd round. He also won the club's Young Player of the Year award, with his form leading to international call-ups.

He missed the start of the 2004–05 season due to a knee injury that he picked up during a pre-season friendly against Wolverhampton Wanderers in July 2004. He made a return to first team action in October, but the injury recurred, forcing him to miss big chunks of the season. Accrington again picked up another trophy when they defeated Burscough 7–0 over a two-legged affair in the Lancashire FA Challenge Trophy final, with Procter winning the competition for the second time.

He started the 2005–06 season as a regular in central midfield with Ian Craney, before suffering a serious cruciate knee ligament injury in August in training on the same knee that he had injured in the previous season. He was forced to undergo an operation and was on the sidelines for just over seven months before making his return on 17 April 2006 in a 1–0 win over Scarborough. By this stage, Accrington had already secured the league title and promotion to Football League Two for the first time in forty-four years after bankruptcy forced their expulsion from The Football League.

The highlight of his career came on 28 April 2007 in a crucial League Two six-pointer with Macclesfield Town. Procter scored two goals in a 3–2 victory which secured Accrington Stanley's Football League status in their first season back after promotion from the Conference.

He studied at the University of Salford on a part-time basis for a degree in Physiotherapy, a programme he decided to follow after suffering a cruciate knee ligament injury in 2005.

Procter was in demand during the January transfer window from fellow League Two clubs Rochdale and Macclesfield Town, with the latter offering a five-figure fee which was rejected due to being "a long way short" of Accrington's valuation of the player.

In May 2009, Accrington faced severe financial crisis due to an unpaid tax bill of £300,000 to HM Revenue and Customs with the club receiving a notice of winding up proceedings and a High Court hearing set for 10 June. This caused the club to dramatically reduce their playing budget for the 2009–10 season. Procter admitted that he was considering his future having been told he would have to take a pay cut on the two-year deal that he was offered and he was again receiving interest from League Two side Rochdale.

In July 2011, he signed a new deal at Accrington having turned down better financial offers from League One sides Leyton Orient and Stevenage, being granted a testimonial as part of the deal. Procter stated, "the wages would have been higher but there’s the cost of living in the south, because I’d have been paying London prices. With my personal situation it wasn’t right for me to relocate."

Procter signed for Preston North End on 20 January 2012 and was announced captain on his arrival and he received a new two-year deal on 1 July 2012. He scored his first goal for the club against future club Bury in a Football League Trophy tie on 18 December 2012. After 23 league appearances, 17 of them coming from the bench he decided to cancel his contract via mutual consent with the Lilywhites after 18 months of service.

After a week without a club Procter joined Bury on a free transfer penning a two-year deal with the Shakers. In his first season at Bury he made 28 appearances in all competitions. In his second season at Bury he was put on the transfer list along with Ashley Grimes after being seen as surplus to requirements. On 1 September 2014, he had his contract cancelled because Procter wanted to leave Bury.

Procter rejoined Accrington Stanley on 1 September. He competed against the likes of Luke Joyce and Josh Windass in 2014–15 season.

== International career ==
Procter was called-up alongside two other Accrington Stanley players in January 2004 for the England National Game XI for the friendly match against Italy U23 on 11 February 2004 at Gay Meadow. However, he eventually missed out due to injury. He then turned down a second call-up in May 2004 for the Four Nations Tournament in Scotland due to it clashing with his degree finals at Leeds University. He did however receive a third call-up for the match against Iraq on 27 May 2004, making his debut as a substitute in a 5–1 defeat at Moss Rose.

== Career statistics ==
As of match played 19 September 2015

Appearances and goals by club, season and competition
Club	Season	League			FA Cup		League Cup		Other		Total	
Club	Season	Division	Apps	Goals	Apps	Goals	Apps	Goals	Apps	Goals	Apps	Goals
Accrington Stanley	2001–02	NPL Premier Division	14	2	—		—		3 (Note: Appearances in NPL Challenge Cup / NPL Challenge Trophy / Lancashire Senior Cup)	0	17	2
Accrington Stanley	2002–03	NPL Premier Division	29	5	3	0	—		5 (Note: Appearances in FA Trophy / NPL Challenge Cup / NPL Challenge Trophy / Lancashire Senior Cup)	0	37	5
Accrington Stanley	2003–04	Football Conference	39	2	6	0	—		3 (Note: Appearances in FA Trophy / Lancashire Senior Cup)	0	48	2
Accrington Stanley	2004–05	Conference National	26	0	0	0	—		10 (Note: Appearances in Football League Trophy / FA Trophy / Conference League Cup / Lancashire Senior Cup)	0	36	0
Accrington Stanley	2005–06	Conference National	6	0	0	0	—		0	0	6	0
Accrington Stanley	2006–07	League Two	43	3	0	0	1	0	2 (Note: Appearances in Football League Trophy)	0	46	3
Accrington Stanley	2007–08	League Two	43	10	1	0	1	0	1	1	46	11
Accrington Stanley	2008–09	League Two	37	3	2	0	0	0	0	0	39	3
Accrington Stanley	2009–10	League Two	44	5	5	0	2	0	4	0	55	5
Accrington Stanley	2010–11	League Two	43	6	2	0	2	0	2 (Note: Appearances in League Two play-offs)	0	49	6
Accrington Stanley	2011–12	League Two	25	2	1	0	1	0	2	1	29	3
Accrington Stanley	Total		349	38	20	0	7	0	32	2	408	40
Preston North End	2011–12	League One	19	0	—		—		—		19	0
Preston North End	2012–13	League One	15	0	2	0	2	0	4	1	23	1
Preston North End	Total		34	0	2	0	2	0	4	1	42	1
Bury	2013–14	League Two	32	2	2	0	2	0	1	0	37	2
Accrington Stanley	2014–15	League Two	29	0	4	0	0	0	0	0	33	0
Accrington Stanley	2015–16	League Two	3	0	0	0	0	0	1	0	4	0
Accrington Stanley	Total		32	0	4	0	0	0	1	0	37	0
Career total			444	40	28	0	11	0	46	3	524	43

== Honours ==
Accrington Stanley

- Conference National: 2005–06
- Northern Premier League Premier Division: 2002–03
- Northern Premier League Challenge Cup: 2001–02
- Northern Premier League Challenge Shield: 2001–02, 2002–03
- Lancashire FA Challenge Trophy: 2001–02, 2004–05

Individual

- Accrington Stanley Young Player of the Year: 2003–04
