= Andrew Tretton =

English footballer

Personal information
- Date of birth: 9 October 1976 (age 50)
- Place of birth: Derby, England
- Position: Defender

Senior career*
Years	Team	Apps	(Gls)
1995–1997	Derby County	0	(0)
1997	→ Gresley Rovers (loan)	2	(0)
1997	Chesterfield	0	(0)
1997–2002	Shrewsbury Town	112	(6)
2002–2005	Hereford United	85	(3)
2005–2007	Accrington Stanley	7	(0)
Total		206	(9)

International career
2004	England C	4	(0)
- * Club domestic league appearances and goals

Andrew Tretton (born 9 October 1976) is an English former footballer who played as a defender in the Football League for Shrewsbury Town. He retired in 2007 due to a persistent knee injury. He is now the Commercial Director at Shrewsbury Town.

== Career ==
Tretton began his career at hometown club Derby County. While with Derby, he was loaned to Southern League Premier Division club Gresley Rovers for one month in September 1997, where he made three appearances.

On 4 July 2002, Tretton signed for Football Conference club Hereford United, on a two-year contract. After three seasons with Hereford, he signed a two-year contract with fellow Conference National club Accrington Stanley in June 2005. He made only seven appearances for the Lancashire club during an injury-ravaged two-year stay, which included a lengthy spell on the sidelines due to a persistent knee injury that ultimately required surgery.

Tretton retired from professional football in April 2007 as a result of his injury problems, receiving an insurance payout from Accrington that meant he was unable to play professionally again. He did briefly feature for part-time AFC Telford United during pre-season in 2007 as he was still able to play semi-professionally, but a move never materialised.

== Career statistics ==
Appearances and goals by club, season and competition
Club	Season	League			FA Cup		League Cup		Other		Total	
Club	Season	Division	Apps	Goals	Apps	Goals	Apps	Goals	Apps	Goals	Apps	Goals
Shrewsbury Town	1997–98	Third Division	14	1	0	0	0	0	0	0	14	1
Shrewsbury Town	1998–99	Third Division	24	0	1	0	0	0	1 (Note: Appearance in Football League Trophy)	0	26	0
Shrewsbury Town	1999–2000	Third Division	33	3	2	0	1	0	1	0	37	3
Shrewsbury Town	2000–01	Third Division	22	2	0	0	1	0	0	0	23	2
Shrewsbury Town	2001–02	Third Division	19	0	1	0	0	0	0	0	20	0
Shrewsbury Town	Total		112	6	4	0	2	0	2	0	120	6
Hereford United	2002–03	Football Conference	36	0	1	0	—		1	0	38	0
Hereford United	2003–04	Football Conference	22	2	0	0	—		2 (Note: Appearances in Football Conference play-offs)	0	24	2
Hereford United	2004–05	Conference National	27	1	0	0	—		3 (Note: One appearance in Football League Trophy; two appearances in Conference National play-offs)	0	30	1
Hereford United	Total		85	3	1	0	—		6	0	92	3
Accrington Stanley	2005–06	Conference National	7	0	0	0	—		0	0	7	0
Accrington Stanley	2006–07	League Two	0	0	0	0	0	0	0	0	0	0
Accrington Stanley	Total		7	0	0	0	0	0	0	0	7	0
Career total			204	9	5	0	2	0	8	0	219	9
