= Leam Richardson =

English football manager and player

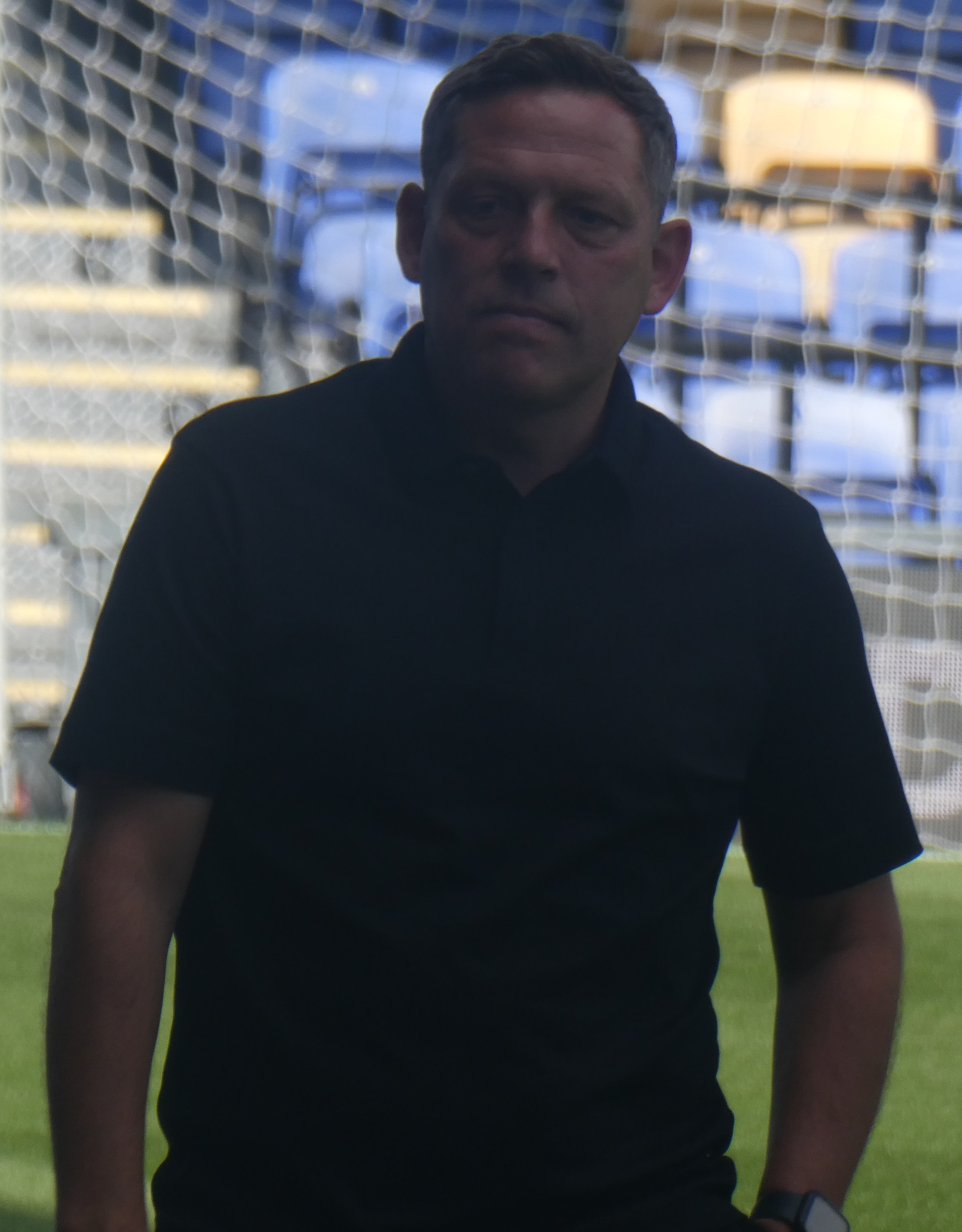
- Richardson as Reading manager in 2026

Personal information
- Full name: Leam Nathan Richardson
- Date of birth: 19 November 1979 (age 47)
- Place of birth: Leeds, England
- Position: Right back

Team information
- Current team: Reading (manager)

Youth career
- –1997: Blackburn Rovers

Senior career*
Years	Team	Apps	(Gls)
1997–2000	Blackburn Rovers	0	(0)
2000–2003	Bolton Wanderers	13	(0)
2001–2002	→ Notts County (loan)	17	(0)
2002–2003	→ Blackpool (loan)	20	(0)
2003–2005	Blackpool	51	(0)
2005–2013	Accrington Stanley	133	(2)
Total		234	(2)

Managerial career
- 2012: Accrington Stanley (caretaker)
- 2012–2013: Accrington Stanley
- 2020: Wigan Athletic (caretaker)
- 2020–2022: Wigan Athletic
- 2023–2024: Rotherham United
- 2025–: Reading
- * Club domestic league appearances and goals

Leam Nathan Richardson (born 19 November 1979) is an English professional football manager and former player, currently managing Reading in EFL League One.

During his playing career Richardson played as a defender for Blackburn Rovers, Bolton Wanderers, Notts County, Blackpool and Accrington Stanley. He later held coaching roles at Accrington Stanley and Chesterfield. He was appointed as the permanent manager of Wigan Athletic in April 2021 and later managed Rotherham United. In October 2025 he was appointed as the manager of Reading.

== Playing career ==
=== Blackburn Rovers ===
Born in Leeds, West Yorkshire, Richardson started his career at Blackburn Rovers. He made his debut in a 1–0 loss against his boyhood side Leeds United in the Football League Cup on 13 October 1999.

=== Bolton Wanderers and loan moves ===
On 13 July 2000, Richardson moved to Bolton Wanderers for a fee of £50,000. He made his debut in a 1–1 draw against Burnley in the Football League First Division on 12 August 2000, and was part of the team which earned a return to the Premier League via the play-offs, when they defeated Preston North End in the final at the Millennium Stadium in Cardiff.

In the 2001–02 season, he made his Premier League debut, playing the final eight minutes of Bolton's 0–0 draw at Leeds; later, he moved on loan to Notts County, where he made seventeen league appearances in the Second Division.

In 2002, Richardson was loaned out again, this time to Blackpool. He made his debut in a 3–0 win against Peterborough United in the Football League Second Division on 21 December 2002. While at Blackpool, he received the first red card of his career, being sent off against Huddersfield Town on 1 January 2003.

=== Blackpool ===
On 23 June 2003, Richardson made a permanent move to Blackpool, joining on a free transfer. He made his debut in a 5–0 loss against Queens Park Rangers on 9 August 2003, and scored his first goal for the club against Oldham Athletic in the FA Cup on 6 December 2003. On 21 March 2004, he appeared as a 90th-minute substitute in the 2004 Football League Trophy final, in which Blackpool defeated Southend United 2–0.

On 10 May 2005, he was released from the club along with Robert Clare.

=== Accrington Stanley ===
After three months without a club, Richardson joined Accrington Stanley on a free transfer on non-contract terms. He made his debut against Canvey Island in the Football Conference on 13 August 2005, and was a regular fixture in the team which won promotion to the Football League in the 2005–06 season. In League Two, he continued to be an important player at Accrington, playing 43 times in all competitions during the 2006–07 season and 40 times the following campaign; he scored his first goal for the club against Brentford on 26 February 2008.

During the 2008–09 season, Richardson found his playing time limited, making fourteen appearances in all competitions, and in the following season he played only twice in the league and once in the Football League Trophy. He scored his second career league goal in a 2–1 win over Cheltenham Town on 15 January 2011, in a season in which he made thirteen league appearances, but the 2–1 victory at Morecambe on 26 December 2011 – where he appeared as a 79th-minute substitute – would be his last appearance for the club.

== Managerial career ==
=== Accrington Stanley and assistant manager roles ===
In January 2012, Richardson became the caretaker manager of Accrington Stanley, after John Coleman departed to join Rochdale. Richardson's first match as manager was at home to Gillingham, which Accrington Stanley won 4–3. Accrington appointed Paul Cook as their new permanent manager the following month, before Richardson was re-appointed as manager after Cook left to become manager of Chesterfield in October. Originally employed as caretaker manager for a second spell, he was appointed as the manager of the club on a permanent basis from 1 November, signing a two-and-a-half-year deal.

On 30 April 2013, it was announced that Richardson had left Accrington in order to re-unite with Paul Cook, becoming his new assistant manager at Chesterfield. The two later moved to manage Portsmouth in 2015, winning promotion to League One in 2017.

=== Wigan Athletic ===
On 31 May 2017, Richardson once again followed Cook to Wigan Athletic, once again acting as his assistant manager. He and Cook oversaw Wigan's promotion to the Championship in their first season in charge, and kept them there for two seasons.

Following a takeover in mid-2020, Wigan collapsed into administration and were relegated after being punished with a 12 point deduction. Cook resigned as manager on 4 August 2020 and Richardson was appointed to take charge of training duties until further notice. John Sheridan was appointed as the club's new permanent manager, but he left after just 15 games to join Swindon Town, and Richardson was named caretaker manager. Following Wigan's takeover in March 2021, the new owners stated that Richardson would continue in his caretaker manager role until the end of the season.

Despite this, Richardson was appointed as the permanent manager of the club on 21 April 2021 with three games still remaining. Richardson confirmed that Cook, who had recently been appointed manager of Ipswich Town, had asked him to join him in Suffolk as his assistant again, but he declined so he could remain at Wigan. He said that there was no ill-will on either side and that they remain on good terms. He was able to keep Wigan in the division, avoiding relegation to League Two.

In November 2021, Wigan striker Charlie Wyke collapsed during training after suffering a cardiac arrest. Following his discharge from hospital Wyke praised Richardson's swift initiation of CPR saying: "...my life has been saved by the actions of the gaffer [Leam Richardson] and the club doctor Jonathan Tobin..."

On 24 April 2022, Richardson was named the 2021–22 EFL League One Manager of the Season at the league's annual award ceremony. Later that month Richardson led Wigan to promotion into the Championship as they finished the season as League One champions.

On 10 November 2022, Richardson was dismissed as Wigan manager after a run of six losses in seven matches that saw the club fall into the Championship relegation zone. The dismissal came just sixteen days after Richardson had signed a new three-year contract with the club.

=== Rotherham United ===
On 11 December 2023, Richardson was appointed head coach of Championship bottom club Rotherham United on a three-and-a-half-year deal. On 17 April 2024, two weeks after relegation was confirmed, Richardson was dismissed having won just two of his 24 matches in charge.

=== Reading ===
On 28 October 2025, Richardson was appointed as manager of League One club Reading on a contract until the summer of 2027.

He was named EFL League One Manager of the Month for September 2026 having picked up ten points from five matches as the Royals climbed to within a point of the play-off places.

== Career statistics ==
Appearances and goals by club, season and competition
Club	Season	League			FA Cup		League Cup		Other		Total	
Club	Season	Division	Apps	Goals	Apps	Goals	Apps	Goals	Apps	Goals	Apps	Goals
Blackburn Rovers	1997–98	Premier League	0	0	0	0	0	0	0	0	0	0
Blackburn Rovers	1998–99	Premier League	0	0	0	0	0	0	0	0	0	0
Blackburn Rovers	1999–2000	First Division	0	0	0	0	1	0	0	0	1	0
Blackburn Rovers	Total		0	0	0	0	1	0	0	0	1	0
Bolton Wanderers	2000–01	First Division	12	0	1	0	2	0	0	0	15	0
Bolton Wanderers	2001–02	Premier League	1	0	0	0	2	0	0	0	3	0
Bolton Wanderers	2002–03	Premier League	0	0	0	0	0	0	0	0	0	0
Bolton Wanderers	Total		13	0	1	0	4	0	0	0	18	0
Notts County (loan)	2001–02	Second Division	17	0	1	0	0	0	0	0	18	0
Blackpool (loan)	2002–03	Second Division	20	0	1	0	0	0	0	0	21	0
Blackpool	2003–04	Second Division	28	0	1	1	1	0	6 (Note: Appearance(s) in Football League Trophy)	0	36	1
Blackpool	2004–05	League One	23	0	0	0	1	0	3	0	27	0
Blackpool	Total		51	0	1	1	2	0	9	0	63	1
Accrington Stanley	2005–06	Conference Premier	33	0	0	0	0	0	0	0	33	0
Accrington Stanley	2006–07	League Two	38	0	1	0	2	0	2	0	43	0
Accrington Stanley	2007–08	League Two	37	1	1	0	1	0	1	0	40	1
Accrington Stanley	2008–09	League Two	11	0	2	0	1	0	0	0	14	0
Accrington Stanley	2009–10	League Two	2	0	0	0	0	0	1	0	3	0
Accrington Stanley	2010–11	League Two	11	1	1	0	0	0	1	0	13	1
Accrington Stanley	2011–12	League Two	1	0	0	0	0	0	0	0	1	0
Accrington Stanley	2012–13	League Two	0	0	0	0	0	0	0	0	0	0
Accrington Stanley	Total		133	2	5	0	4	0	5	0	147	2
Career total			234	2	9	1	11	0	14	0	268	3

== Managerial statistics ==
As of match played 21 November 2026

Managerial record by team and tenure
Team	From	To	Record					Ref.
Team	From	To	P	W	D	L	Win %	Ref.
Accrington Stanley (caretaker)	23 January 2012	13 February 2012	1	1	0	0	100.0	
Accrington Stanley	25 October 2012	30 April 2013	36	10	11	15	27.8	
Wigan Athletic (caretaker)	4 August 2020	11 September 2020	1	0	0	1	0.0	
Wigan Athletic	13 November 2020	10 November 2022	117	49	30	38	41.9	
Rotherham United	11 December 2023	17 April 2024	24	2	4	18	8.3	
Reading	28 October 2025	Present	56	21	16	19	37.5	
Total			235	83	61	91	35.3	

== Honours ==
=== As a player ===
Blackpool

- Football League Trophy: 2003–04

=== As a manager ===
Wigan Athletic

- EFL League One: 2021–22

Individual

- EFL League One Manager of the Season: 2021–22
- EFL League One Manager of the Month: September 2026
