= Mark King (footballer) =

English footballer

Personal information
- Date of birth: 6 June 1988 (age 38)
- Place of birth: England
- Position: Midfielder

Senior career*
Years	Team	Apps	(Gls)
2007–2008	Blackburn Rovers	0	(0)
2008–2009	Accrington Stanley	68	(0)
- * Club domestic league appearances and goals

Mark King (born 6 June 1988) is an English former professional footballer. He had previously been signed on non-contract terms at Northwich Victoria F.C. after being released by Accrington Stanley at the end of the 2007–2008 season, however he left Northwich in September 2008.

== Career ==
He started his career at Blackburn Rovers after coming through the youth system and then into the reserves. However, he failed to make an appearance for the first team side at Ewood Park in the Premier League, mainly because he sustained two serious knee injuries.

He was signed by Football League Two side Accrington Stanley on 11 January 2008 on a free transfer. He first caught the eye of John Coleman when he featured for Blackburn Rovers in a training match against Accrington in a training match in December 2007. King can play at left-back or centre-back. He made his league debut in the 2–0 loss to Stockport County.cc. He went on to play 68 games for the league two side
