= Aswad Thomas =

English footballer

Personal information
- Full name: Aswad Kwame Leon Thomas
- Date of birth: 9 August 1989 (age 37)
- Place of birth: Westminster, England
- Height: 5 ft 10 in (1.78 m)
- Position: Left back

Youth career
- 2005–2007: Charlton Athletic

Senior career*
Years	Team	Apps	(Gls)
2007–2009	Charlton Athletic	0	(0)
2008	→ Accrington Stanley (loan)	13	(2)
2008	→ Barnet (loan)	2	(0)
2008–2009	→ Lewes (loan)	14	(0)
2009–2011	Woking	72	(3)
2011–2012	Braintree Town	43	(5)
2012–2015	Grimsby Town	90	(1)
2015	Woking	2	(0)
2015–2017	Dover Athletic	68	(5)
2017–2019	Sutton United	66	(3)
2019–2020	Ebbsfleet United	9	(2)
Total		379	(21)

International career^{‡}
2012–2013	England C	2	(0)
- * Club domestic league appearances and goals as of 13:45 9 May 2022 (UTC) ‡ National team caps and goals as of 15:06 3 February 2015 (UTC)

Aswad Kwame Leon Thomas (born 9 August 1989) is an English former professional footballer who played as a left-back.

Having started his career with Charlton Athletic; he spent time on loan with Accrington Stanley, Barnet and Lewes before signing for Woking in 2009, and Braintree Town in 2011. He played for Grimsby Town for two and a half years and had a second short stint with Woking before joining Dover Athletic in 2015. He later had spells with Sutton United and Ebbsfleet United before retiring in 2020.

== Career ==
=== Charlton Athletic ===
Thomas started his career with the Charlton Athletic youth system. Although he never made his senior debut, Thomas appeared on the bench twice, but he did make four appearances for the U18s and featured 11 times for the reserves in the 2007–08 season, scoring in the 8–4 home victory over Southampton in September 2007. Thomas had been compared to former Charlton hero Richard Rufus, and noted as a clean striker of a ball, athletic and strong in the tackle.

He joined Accrington Stanley on loan in January 2008 where he made his Football League debut against Wycombe Wanderers. He scored twice in a 2–3 victory against Chester City, firing in Leam Richardson's defence-splitting pass and Thomas followed up John Danby's parry from his own shot to level. He returned to Charlton after serving his suspension for being sent off against Macclesfield Town when he had thrown the ball in the face of Shaun Brisley. He also played twice on loan at Barnet at the start of the 2008–09 season, after completing his month-long loan with League Two side Barnet, shortly afterwards he joined Lewes on loan.

=== Woking ===
He signed a one-year contract with Conference South outfit Woking in 2009 and scored on his debut against Welling United which Woking went on to win 2–1.

=== Braintree Town ===
In June 2011, Thomas signed for the newly promoted Conference National team Braintree Town. After playing five games with three clean sheets, Thomas received his first of seven yellow cards on 29 August 2011 in the 50th minute, in the 2–3 defeat against Ebbsfleet United. He scored his first of five goals in the 2011–12 season, a close range shot into the bottom right corner in the 6–2 defeat at York City. Three games later he scored in the 5–4 defeat against Kidderminster Harriers.

England C manager Paul Fairclough confirmed that Thomas had been close to getting an international call-up, and on 10 November 2011 Aswad Thomas was included in the stand-by contingency squad for the England C team in the friendly against Gibraltar on the following Tuesday. On 26 November 2011 Thomas received his 2nd yellow card of the season in the 10th minute for unsporting behaviour and was sent off in the 85th minute for his second bookable offence, an unfair foul on Curtis Obeng, serving a one match ban after the 0–0 stalemate against Wrexham. On 26 December 2011 he received his 3rd yellow card in 78th minute for a foul on substitute defender Jonathon Thorpe in the 2–0 away defeat at Cambridge United. Thomas scored his 5th and final goal for Braintree

At the start of the new calendar year and in the following game on New Year's Day, again Thomas fouled Jonathon Thorpe to receive his 4th yellow card in the 19th minute in the 3–2 victory at home against Cambridge United. His third goal of the season came when he scored the opening goal, Thomas volleyed in Ben Wright's cross in the 2–2 draw at home against Stockport County. He scored a crucial 79th-minute goal in the 1–0 home win against Barrow, a low pass from defender Dean Wells to Thomas, he scored inside the six-yard box to the bottom right corner of the goal. On 18 February 2012 he received his 5th yellow card in the 1–0 away defeat at A.F.C. Telford United for unsporting behaviour, after giving away a free kick for an unfair challenge on striker Chris Sharp. On 17 March 2012 Thomas received his 6th yellow card in the 1–4 defeat at home to Kidderminster for unsporting behaviour, after conceding a free kick for a foul on defender Lee Vaughan. On 24 March 2012 Thomas scored the opening goal in the 0–4 thrashing of Barrow, latching onto striker Sean Marks' header from 18 yards at the edge of the penalty box to the top left corner of the goal.

On 14 April 2012 Thomas was forced to sit on the bench despite not being 100 per cent fit at Stockport County and missed the following home game against York City also due to the knee injury. Having missed the previous two games, Thomas played in what became his last and final game of the season for Braintree in the 5–1 defeat at Wrexham.

=== Grimsby Town ===
Thomas signed a two-year deal with Conference National side Grimsby Town on 4 July 2012, for an undisclosed fee, thought to be around £15,000.

Having impressed in his first five games for Grimsby, Thomas was named in the England C squad to face Belgium in Brussels on Wednesday 12 September in an International Challenge Trophy game.

In his first two seasons with Grimsby, Thomas was a runner-up in the 2013 FA Trophy as well as losing in the Conference Premier semi-final in both years. On 4 January 2014 he scored a last minute own goal which meant Grimsby were dumped out of the FA Cup third round in a 2–3 defeat against Huddersfield Town. On 22 January 2015, Thomas was signed off from work with the club after suffering from stress. Thomas had requested the cancellation of his contract in order to resolve personal issues and sort out a transfer away from the club, however Grimsby decided in this case to allow the player a month's leave. On 3 February Thomas was released by Grimsby on mutual consent.

=== Return to Woking ===
Shortly after being given a month's leave by Grimsby, it was confirmed by Conference Premier side Woking that Thomas had returned to the club and had signed contractual forms for the rest of the season.

=== Dover Athletic ===
On 28 August 2015, following his release from Woking, Thomas joined Dover Athletic on a one-year deal.

=== Sutton United ===
Thomas joined Sutton United in the 2017 close season alongside former Dover teammates Ross Lafayette and Moses Emmanuel. He made his club debut on 5 August 2017 in a 2–0 home victory over Leyton Orient. He scored his first goal for the club on 23 September in a 3–2 win against Barrow.

== Personal life ==
After retiring from football, Thomas is now a Caribbean chef and set up Dreadz Kitchen which is offering Caribbean meals to his local community in London from his own kitchen.

== International career ==
Thomas was called up to the England C team in 2012.

== Career statistics ==
As of match played 7 September 2019

Appearances and goals by club, season and competition
Club	Season	League			FA Cup		League Cup		Other		Total	
Club	Season	Division	Apps	Goals	Apps	Goals	Apps	Goals	Apps	Goals	Apps	Goals
Charlton Athletic	2007–08	Championship	0	0	0	0	0	0	—		0	0
Charlton Athletic	2008–09	Championship	0	0	0	0	0	0	—		0	0
Charlton Athletic	Total		0	0	0	0	0	0	—		0	0
Accrington Stanley (loan)	2007–08	League Two	13	2	—		—		—		13	2
Barnet (loan)	2008–09	League Two	2	0	—		—		1 (Note: Appearance in Football League Trophy)	0	3	0
Lewes (loan)	2008–09	Conference Premier	14	0	—		—		—		14	0
Woking	2009–10	Conference South	37	2	3	0	—		6 (Note: Three appearances in Conference South play-offs, three in FA Trophy)	0	46	2
Woking	2010–11	Conference South	35	1	6	0	—		5 (Note: Two appearances in Conference South play-offs, three in FA Trophy)	0	46	1
Woking	Total		72	3	9	0	—		11	0	92	3
Braintree Town	2011–12	Conference Premier	43	5	1	0	—		3 (Note: Appearances in FA Trophy)	0	47	5
Grimsby Town	2012–13	Conference Premier	41	1	2	0	—		7 (Note: Two appearances in Conference Premier play-offs, five in FA Trophy)	0	50	1
Grimsby Town	2013–14	Conference Premier	36	0	5	0	—		4 (Note: Two appearances in Conference Premier play-offs, two in FA Trophy)	0	45	0
Grimsby Town	2014–15	Conference Premier	13	0	2	0	—		1	0	16	0
Grimsby Town	Total		90	1	9	0	—		12	0	111	1
Woking	2014–15	Conference Premier	2	0	—		—		—		2	0
Dover Athletic	2015–16	National League	24	1	2	1	—		4 (Note: Two appearances in National League play-offs, two in FA Trophy)	0	30	2
Dover Athletic	2016–17	National League	44	4	2	1	—		2	0	48	5
Dover Athletic	Total		68	5	4	2	—		6	0	78	7
Sutton United	2017–18	National League	37	1	1	0	—		3 (Note: One appearance in Conference Premier play-offs, two in the FA Trophy)	0	41	1
Sutton United	2018–19	National League	29	2	2	0	—		2 (Note: Two appearances in the Scottish League Challenge Cup)	0	33	2
Sutton United	Total		66	3	3	0	—		5	0	74	3
Ebbsfleet United	2019–20	National League	9	2	0	0	—		0	0	9	2
Career total			379	20	26	2	0	0	38	0	449	22

== Honours ==
=== Club ===
Grimsby Town

- Lincolnshire Senior Cup Winners (1): 2012–13
- FA Trophy : Runners-up, 2012–13

=== Individual ===
- Braintree Supporters Player of The Season: 2011–12
- Conference National Team of the Year: 2012–13
