= Andy Todd (footballer, born 1979) =

English footballer

Personal information
- Full name: Andrew Jonathan Todd
- Date of birth: 22 February 1979 (age 47)
- Place of birth: Nottingham, England
- Positions: Midfielder; forward

Senior career*
Years	Team	Apps	(Gls)
1996–1999	Nottingham Forest	0	(0)
1999	→ Scarborough (loan)	1	(0)
1999–2001	Eastwood Town		
2001–2004	Worksop Town		
2004–2005	Hucknall Town	37	(7)
2005–2006	Burton Albion	20	(2)
2006	→ Accrington Stanley (loan)	14	(6)
2006–2007	Accrington Stanley	46	(10)
2007–2009	Rotherham United	13	(0)
2008	→ Accrington Stanley (loan)	21	(0)
2008	→ Eastwood Town (loan)	41	(12)
2009–2010	Alfreton Town	33	(7)
2010–2011	Eastwood Town	37	(6)
2011–2013	Mansfield Town	13	(1)
2013–2014	Tamworth	35	(2)
2014–2015	AFC Telford United	16	(1)
2015–2016	Hednesford Town	27	(1)
2016–2017	Matlock Town	2	(0)
2016–2017	→ Long Eaton United (loan)	30	(9)
2017–2019	Long Eaton United	43	(5)

Managerial career
- 2018–2019: Long Eaton United (joint)
- * Club domestic league appearances and goals

Andrew Jonathan Todd (born 22 February 1979) is an English retired footballer who played as a midfielder.

== Playing career ==
=== Burton Albion ===
He was a late substitute for the Burton Albion side under Nigel Clough that drew 0–0 against Manchester United in the third round of the 2005–06 FA Cup.

=== Accrington Stanley ===
Todd joined divisional rivals Accrington Stanley on loan in January 2006, scoring six goals in fourteen appearances as Stanley won the Conference National title. After impressing during his loan spell, he signed permanently in the summer in preparation for their first season in League Two.

=== Rotherham United ===
Todd was signed by Rotherham United on a two-year deal on 17 May 2007, after turning down a new deal from Accrington. He rejoined Accrington on a month's loan in January 2008.

On 2 October 2008, he signed a three-month loan deal with one of his former clubs, Eastwood Town and made a great start scoring one and assisting in another goal in a 3–1 win over Nantwich Town.

=== Alfreton Town and Eastwood Town ===
Todd played for Alfreton Town during the 2009–10 season, before returning to Eastwood Town in June 2010.

=== Mansfield Town ===
On 28 June 2011, Todd signed as a player-coach at Mansfield Town. He made his debut on 13 August against Bath City. On 22 October he scored his first league goal and winner against local rivals Alfreton Town. In the 2012–13 season Todd was a member of Mansfield's Conference National title winning squad.

=== Tamworth ===
Todd left The Stags in July 2013 after he was offered a coaching role at the club, but he was looking to extend his playing career. A month later he joined Conference Premier side Tamworth following a successful trial.

=== AFC Telford United ===
It was announced on 4 July 2014 Todd would join Telford as player-coach for the upcoming season.

=== Hednesford Town ===
Todd signed for Hednesford Town on 13 February 2015. He fractured his radius and dislocated his ulna in his arm on 7 January 2016, and did not feature for the club again.

=== Matlock Town ===
In August 2016, Todd signed for Matlock Town. In September 2016, he moved on loan to Long Eaton United after being limited to two substitute appearances with the Gladiators.

=== Long Eaton United ===
He subsequently joined the Blues permanently, making 81 appearances for the club in all competitions across both his loan and permanent spell.

== Managerial career ==
In December 2018, Todd was appointed joint-manager of Long Eaton United, alongside Paul Holland. The duo were replaced in May 2019.

== Honours ==
Hucknall Town

- FA Trophy runner-up: 2004–05

Accrington Stanley

- Conference National: 2005–06

Eastwood Town

- Northern Premier League Premier Division: 2008–09
- Peter Swales Shield: 2008–09

Mansfield Town

- Conference Premier: 2012–13

Individual

- Accrington Stanley Player of the Season: 2006–07
