= Jay Bell (footballer) =

English footballer

Personal information
- Full name: James Bell
- Date of birth: 24 November 1989 (age 36)
- Place of birth: Liverpool, England
- Position: Defender

Senior career*
Years	Team	Apps	(Gls)
2007–2009	Accrington Stanley	8	(0)
2008	→ Prescot Cables (loan)	6	(0)
2009	Burscough	0	(0)
2009	Bala Town	3	(0)
2009–	Marine	8	(0)
- * Club domestic league appearances and goals as of 14:16, 2 May 2010 (UTC)

James "Jay" Bell (born 24 November 1989) is an English footballer who last played for Marine. He also previously played for Accrington Stanley for three years and made his Football League debut on 26 April 2008 in a 3–1 win over Wrexham. In August 2009, he joined Welsh Premier League side Bala Town, making three appearances before moving to Marine.
