= Ashley Foyle =

English footballer

Personal information
- Full name: Ashley Peter Foyle
- Date of birth: 17 September 1986 (age 40)
- Place of birth: Sheffield, England
- Height: 1.80 m (5 ft 11 in)
- Position: Defender

Senior career*
Years	Team	Apps	(Gls)
2005–2006	Chesterfield	1	(0)
2006	Accrington Stanley	0	(0)
2006–2007	Belper Town		
2007	Buxton	16	(0)
2007–2009	Lincoln United		
2009	Matlock Town		
2009–2010	Worksop Town		
- * Club domestic league appearances and goals

Ashley Peter Foyle (born 17 September 1986) is an English football defender who plays for Northern Premier League Premier Division side Worksop Town F.C. after joining from near neighbours Matlock Town F.C. on the second of September 2009.

He signed for Accrington in August 2006, leaving his only previous professional club, Chesterfield. From there he went on loan to Belper Town and then signed for Northern Premier League First Division winners Buxton F.C. in 2007. Before joining rivals Matlock Town F.C. where he then went off to current club Worksop Town F.C. In July 2013 he started playing with Staveley Miners Welfare FC.
