= Michael Welch (footballer) =

Footballer (born 1982)

Personal information
- Full name: Michael Francis Welch
- Date of birth: 11 January 1982 (age 44)
- Place of birth: Crewe, England
- Position: Defender

Senior career*
Years	Team	Apps	(Gls)
2000–2001	Barnsley	0	(0)
2001–2005	Macclesfield Town	114	(5)
2005–2007	Accrington Stanley	84	(8)
2007–2009	Northwich Victoria	59	(7)
2009	→ Altrincham (loan)	13	(2)
2009–2010	Altrincham	29	(1)
- * Club domestic league appearances and goals as of 13:17, 1 May 2010 (UTC)

Michael Welch (born 11 January 1982) is a football coach and former player. Born in England, he is a former Republic of Ireland youth international.

== Career ==
Welch was born in Crewe. His other previous clubs include Barnsley and Macclesfield Town.

A former Republic of Ireland youth international, he was signed by Stanley prior to the start of the 2005–06 season after creating a superb impression in the pre season games. He started his career as a trainee at Barnsley and on his release in 2001, he was signed by Macclesfield going on to make his debut towards the end of his first season. Before leaving he made over a century of appearances. In December 2006, a goal he scored against Stockport was awarded the accolade of coming second in the "Goal of the Year 2006" competition, bettered only by a goal scored by Argentina in the FIFA World Cup. Welch also won Conference National Goal of the season award 2008–09 for an 80-yard lob against Crawley Town.

He left Altrincham in February 2011.

== Managerial career ==
Welch managed in the Cheshire League with Middlewich Town.

In August 2021, Welch became assistant manager at Altrincham's reserve team.

== Honours ==
- Conference National (V): 2006
