= Ian Craney =

English footballer

Personal information
- Full name: Ian Thomas William Craney
- Date of birth: 21 July 1982 (age 44)
- Place of birth: Liverpool, England
- Position: Midfielder

Youth career
- 1995–2001: Everton

Senior career*
Years	Team	Apps	(Gls)
2001–2004	Altrincham	166	(37)
2004–2007	Accrington Stanley	94	(28)
2006–2007	→ Swansea City (loan)	8	(0)
2007–2008	Swansea City	20	(0)
2007–2008	→ Accrington Stanley (loan)	13	(3)
2008	Accrington Stanley	23	(6)
2008–2010	Huddersfield Town	34	(5)
2009–2010	→ Morecambe (loan)	16	(2)
2010–2011	Fleetwood Town	19	(3)
2010–2011	→ Accrington Stanley (loan)	3	(0)
2011–2012	Accrington Stanley	41	(8)
2012–2013	Rochdale	6	(0)
2013	AFC Telford United	11	(1)
2013–2014	Stockport County	7	(0)
2014	→ Stafford Rangers (loan)		
2014–15	Conwy Borough		
Total		461	(93)

International career
- England C
- * Club domestic league appearances and goals

Ian Thomas William Craney (born 21 July 1982) is an English former professional footballer who played as a midfielder. He was most recently a first-team coach at Ipswich Town.

He had five spells with Accrington Stanley during his career, the latest ending at the end of the 2011–12 season. He also played in the Football League with Swansea City, Huddersfield Town, Morecambe and Rochdale, as well as spells in non-League football with Altrincham and Fleetwood Town.

== Playing career ==
=== Early career ===
After starting his career as a junior at Everton, he got his first break in senior football at Northern Premier League side Altrincham, where he made his first-team debut in September 2000. During his time at Altrincham, he scored 40 goals in 214 matches, and won the club's Player of the Season award for both the 2002–03 and 2003–04 seasons.

=== Accrington Stanley ===
He joined Accrington Stanley in June 2004 on a two year-deal with an option for a further year. The transfer fee was £15,000, plus a further £2,500 after twenty appearances and a 50% sell-on clause. He was part of the Stanley team which won the Conference National title in 2005–06, gaining promotion to the Football League.

Whilst at Accrington, he played for the England National Game XI.

=== Swansea City ===
On 23 November 2006, Craney joined Swansea City on loan until the end of December "with a view to a permanent move". After 8 appearances on loan at Swansea, he joined the club permanently on 9 January 2007 for a fee of £150,000, and signed a two-and-a-half year contract. He played 31 times in total for the club.

=== Return to Accrington Stanley ===
Craney returned to Accrington Stanley on a three-month loan on 25 September 2007, though game time was limited by a hamstring injury and he was recalled by Swansea on 1 November, having made just 3 appearances. However he returned on loan to Accrington two days later, and re-signed for Accrington permanently on 4 January 2008, for a club record £85,000 fee, agreeing a three-and-a-half year deal. He scored 8 times in 34 matches in total for Accrington across the 2007–08 season.

He scored twice in 3 appearances at the start of the 2008–09 season, prior to leaving the club.

=== Huddersfield Town ===
Fellow League Two side Morecambe saw two bids rejected for the midfielder in July 2008, and Craney instead joined Huddersfield Town on a three-year contract for an undisclosed fee on 19 August 2008. He took up the vacant number 5 shirt following the sale of David Mirfin to Scunthorpe United. He made his Town debut in their 3–1 defeat by Milton Keynes Dons at the Kirklees Stadium on 23 August 2008. His first goal for the Terriers was the winning goal in their 2–1 win over Cheltenham Town at Whaddon Road on 6 September 2008.

On 22 July 2009, Craney joined Football League Two side Morecambe on a season-long loan along with teammate Phil Jevons. He got his first goal for the Shrimps in their 5–2 defeat by Burton Albion on 15 August 2009. He suffered an ankle injury in November 2009, and failed to play again for Morecambe. He returned to Huddersfield in April 2010 and his contract with Huddersfield was terminated on 21 April.

=== Fleetwood and third spell at Acctington Stanley ===
He joined Fleetwood Town of the Conference Premier for the 2010–11 season, but on 25 November 2010 he rejoined former club Accrington Stanley for a third spell, on a short-term loan deal until the start of 2011. He returned to Fleetwood Town on 7 January as the clubs failed to agree an extension to his loan deal. On 31 January he rejoined Stanley on a permanent basis for a third time, signing an 18-month contract. He broke his leg in training in October 2011, but returned to training in December 2011. He left Accrington at the end of the 2011–12 season after failing to agree a new contract, and in July 2012 he began training with Grimsby Town.

=== Later career ===
In August 2012 he joined Rochdale on non-contract terms along with Ray Putterill, but the pair were released in January 2013. He then joined AFC Telford United in February 2013 for the rest of the season, becoming the first signing under new manager Mark Cooper. On 2 May 2013 he was released by the club.

On 31 May 2013 he joined Stockport County on a free transfer, but fell out of favour and joined Stafford Rangers for the remainder of the season on 17 January 2014.

At the expiry of his Stockport contract, Craney joined Conwy Borough of the Cymru Alliance league on 7 July 2014.

== Coaching career ==
While studying for his coaching badges Craney worked as kitman of Wigan Athletic, who were managed by former Accrington Stanley teammate Paul Cook.

In May 2021, Craney joined Cook's coaching staff at Ipswich Town as a first-team coach. Craney left the club in December following the sacking of Cook as manager.

== Career statistics ==
Appearances and goals by club, season and competition
Club	Season	League			FA Cup		League Cup		Other		Total	
Club	Season	Division	Apps	Goals	Apps	Goals	Apps	Goals	Apps	Goals	Apps	Goals
Altrincham	2000–01	Northern Premier League Premier Division	38	5	1	0	—		8 (Note: Three appearances in FA Trophy, four appearances in Northern Premier League Challenge Cup, one appearance in Cheshire Senior Cup)	0	47	5
Altrincham	2001–02	Northern Premier League Premier Division	44	9	6	0	—		14 (Note: Five appearances one goal in FA Trophy, four appearances one goal in Northern Premier League Challenge Cup, one appearance in Northern Premier League President's Cup, four appearances one goal in Cheshire Senior Cup)	3	64	12
Altrincham	2002–03	Northern Premier League Premier Division	40	11	2	0	—		7 (Note: Four appearances in FA Trophy, one appearance in Northern Premier League Challenge Cup, one appearance in Northern Premier League President's Cup, one appearance in Cheshire Senior Cup)	0	49	11
Altrincham	2003–04	Northern Premier League Premier Division	44	12	1	0	—		9 (Note: Five appearances in FA Trophy, three appearances in Northern Premier League Challenge Cup, one appearance in Cheshire Senior Cup)	0	54	12
Altrincham	Total		166	37	10	0	—		38	3	214	40
Accrington Stanley	2004–05	Conference National	37	10	1	0	—		13 (Note: Two appearances one goal in Football League Trophy, two appearances in FA Trophy, four appearances in Conference League Cup, five appearances three goals in Lancashire FA Challenge Trophy)	4	51	14
Accrington Stanley	2005–06	Conference National	39	13	2	0	—		6 (Note: One appearance in Football League Trophy, five appearances three goals in FA Trophy)	3	47	16
Accrington Stanley	2006–07	League Two	18	5	1	0	2	0	2 (Note: Appearances in Football League Trophy)	1	23	6
Accrington Stanley	Total		94	28	4	0	2	0	21	8	121	36
Swansea City	2006–07 (Note: Part of this season was spent on loan from Accrington Stanley)	League One	27	0	0	0	0	0	0	0	27	0
Swansea City	2007–08	League One	1	0	0	0	2	0	1	0	4	0
Swansea City	Total		28	0	0	0	2	0	1	0	31	0
Accrington Stanley	2007–08 (Note: Part of this season was spent on loan from Swansea City)	League Two	34	8	0	0	0	0	0	0	34	8
Accrington Stanley	2008–09	League Two	2	1	0	0	1	1	0	0	3	2
Accrington Stanley	Total		36	9	0	0	1	1	0	0	37	10
Huddersfield Town	2008–09	League One	34	5	1	1	0	0	0	0	35	6
Huddersfield Town	2009–10	League One	0	0	0	0	0	0	0	0	0	0
Huddersfield Town	Total		34	5	1	1	0	0	0	0	35	6
Morecambe (loan)	2009–10	League Two	16	2	2	0	1	0	0	0	19	2
Fleetwood Town	2010–11	Conference Premier	19	3	2	0	—		0	0	21	3
Accrington Stanley	2010–11 (Note: Part of this season was spent on loan from Fleetwood Town)	League Two	22	7	0	0	0	0	2 (Note: Appearances in League Two play-offs)	0	24	7
Accrington Stanley	2011–12	League Two	22	1	0	0	1	0	2	0	25	1
Accrington Stanley	Total		44	8	0	0	1	0	4	0	49	8
Rochdale	2012–13	League Two	6	0	1	0	1	0	1	0	9	0
AFC Telford United	2012–13	Conference Premier	11	1	0	0	—		0	0	11	1
Stockport County	2013–14	Conference North	7	0	0	0	—		0	0	7	0
Career total			461	93	20	1	8	1	65	11	554	106

== Honours ==
Accrington Stanley

- Conference National: 2005–06
- Lancashire FA Challenge Trophy: 2004–05

Individual

- Northern Premier League Premier Division Player of the Season: 2002–03
- Conference National Player of the Season: 2005–06
- Altrincham Player of the Season: 2002–03, 2003–04
- Accrington Stanley Player of the Season: 2005–06
