= Paul Mullin (footballer, born 1974) =

English footballer

Personal information
- Full name: Paul Bernard Mullin
- Date of birth: 16 March 1974 (age 52)
- Place of birth: Burnley, England
- Position: Striker

Senior career*
Years	Team	Apps	(Gls)
1995–1996	Accrington Stanley	0	(0)
1996	Darwen		
1996	Trafford		
1996–1998	Clitheroe		
1998–2000	Radcliffe Borough	104	(43)
2000–2009	Accrington Stanley	320	(132)
2009	→ Bradford City (loan)	6	(0)
2009–2011	Morecambe	64	(16)
Total		390	(148)
- * Club domestic league appearances and goals

Paul Bernard Mullin (born 16 March 1974) is an English former professional footballer. He is the brother of fellow former footballer John Mullin.

== Career ==
Born in Burnley, Mullin started his career with Accrington in 1995, making his first-team debut before being released. He then played for Darwen, Trafford, and spent two and a half years at Clitheroe before joining Radcliffe Borough in the summer of 1998. Two years later, in August 2000, he rejoined Northern Premier League Premier Division team Stanley for a fee of £15,000, after a bid of £10,000 had been rejected the previous season. He turned professional in July 2004 when Stanley went full-time after their first season in the Conference, during which Mullin scored 24 goals in all competitions.

On 14 April 2007, Mullin broke Chris Grimshaw's record for club appearances for Accrington Stanley with 362 games in a 4–1 victory against Grimsby Town, scoring the opening goal of the game. Mullin rejected the offer to be captain for the day to avoid getting himself into a testimonial mentality. During his time at the club, Mullin was awarded the Player of the Year accolade on four occasions.

In March 2009, Mullin joined fellow League Two side Bradford City on loan for the rest of the 2008–09 season, to replace Barry Conlon, who was loaned to Grimsby Town. Bradford lost 1–0 to Port Vale on Mullin's debut the following day.

On 31 August 2009 Mullin signed for Morecambe on a one-year deal with option of further year, for an undisclosed fee. He scored his first goal for Morecambe in a 2–1 win over Notts County. On 15 April 2011 Mullin announced his retirement from football.

== Honours ==
Accrington Stanley

- Conference National: 2005–06
- Northern Premier League Premier Division: 2002–03
- Northern Premier League Challenge Cup: 2001–02
- Northern Premier League Peter Swales Shield: 2001–02, 2002–03
- Lancashire FA Challenge Trophy: 2001–02, 2004–05

Individual

- Radcliffe Borough Player of the Season: 1999–2000
- Accrington Stanley Player of the Season: 2000–01, 2001–02, 2003–04, 2004–05
