= Andrew Smith (footballer, born 1989) =

English footballer

Personal information
- Full name: Andrew Smith
- Date of birth: 22 December 1989 (age 36)
- Place of birth: Burnley, England
- Height: 5 ft 11 in (1.80 m)
- Position: Striker

Youth career
- 2006–2008: Accrington Stanley

Senior career*
Years	Team	Apps	(Gls)
2006–2010	Accrington Stanley	35	(6)
2008	→ Clitheroe (loan)	5	(3)
2009	→ Clitheroe (loan)	11	(4)
- * Club domestic league appearances and goals as of 11:24, 31 May 2009 (UTC)

Andrew Greg Smith (born 22 December 1989) is a footballer playing as a striker for Accrington Stanley. He made his debut for Accrington Stanley on 19 April 2008 in the Football League Two clash with Barnet which ended in a 2–0 loss to Stanley.
