= John Coleman (footballer, born 1962) =

English footballer and manager (born 1962)

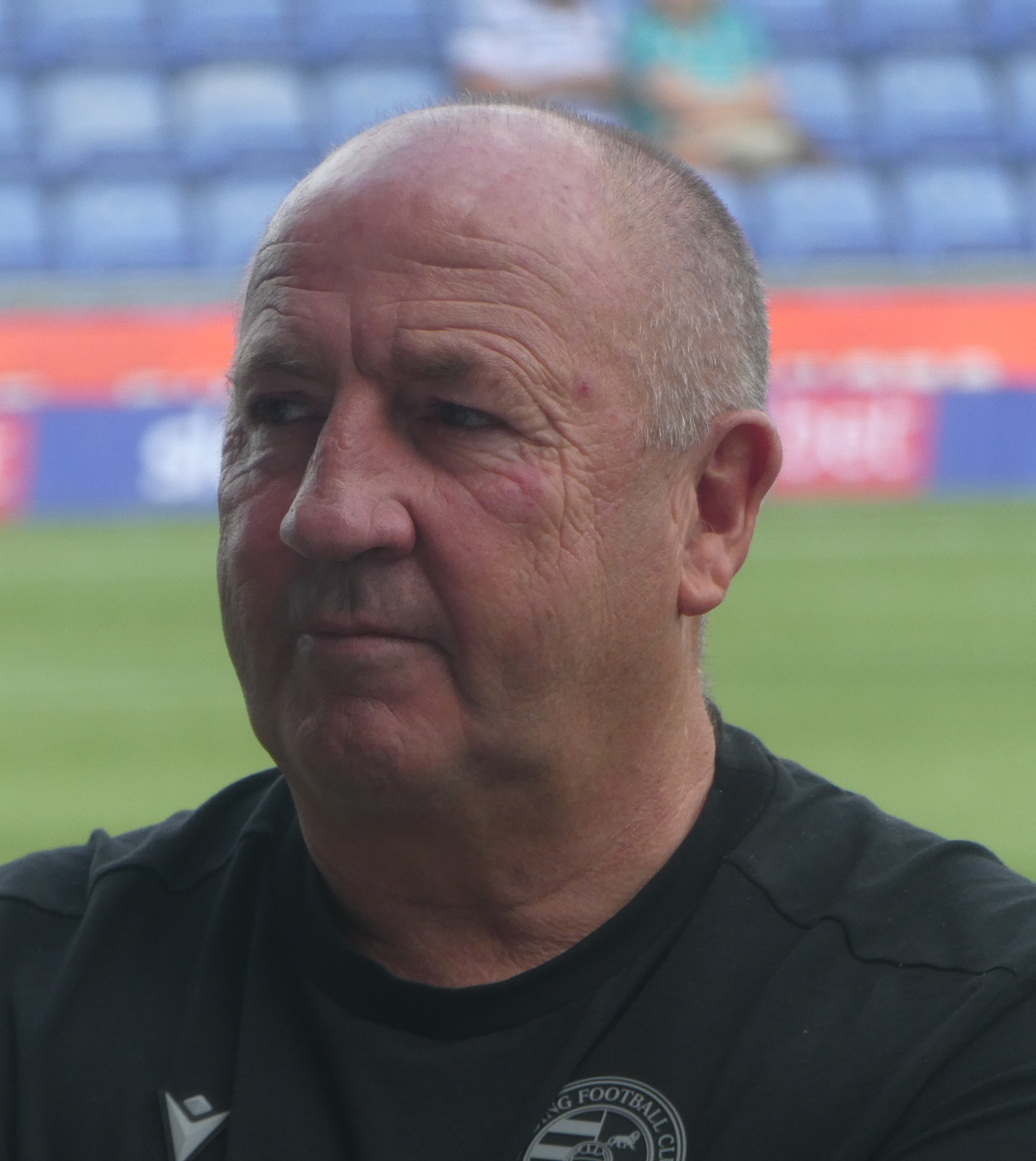
- Coleman in 2026

Personal information
- Date of birth: 12 October 1962 (age 64)
- Place of birth: Kirkby, England
- Position: Forward

Team information
- Current team: Reading (assistant manager)

Senior career*
Years	Team	Apps	(Gls)
1979–1982	Kirkby Town		
1983–1984	Burscough		
1984–1985	Marine		
1985–1988	Southport	89	(49)
1988	Runcorn	6	(1)
1988	Macclesfield Town	11	(1)
1988–1989	Rhyl		
1989–1990	Witton Albion		
1990–1996	Morecambe		
1996–1997	Lancaster City		
1997–1999	Ashton United		

Managerial career
- 1997–1999: Ashton United
- 1999–2012: Accrington Stanley
- 2012–2013: Rochdale
- 2013–2014: Southport
- 2014: Sligo Rovers
- 2014–2024: Accrington Stanley
- 2025: Gillingham
- 2025: Waterford
- 2025–2026: Aldershot Town
- 2026–: Reading (assistant manager)
- * Club domestic league appearances and goals

John Coleman (born 12 October 1962) is an English football manager and former player. He is currently assistant first-team manager of EFL League One club Reading.

== Playing career ==
Coleman had a long playing career, mainly in non-league football for Kirkby Town, Burscough, Marine, Southport, Runcorn F.C. Halton, Macclesfield Town, Morecambe, Lancaster City and Ashton United. He also had a short spell in Wales with Rhyl. He was one of the most prolific non-league goalscorers in history, with over 500 goals to his name in a career spanning almost two decades. This success saw him play for the England National Game XI (the England team for semi-professional players) and receive many Player of the Year awards from the clubs he played for.

Coleman is ranked fifth on Southport's list of highest goalscorers of all-time.

== Managerial career ==
He was appointed player-manager of Ashton United in 1997. After two years, he joined Accrington Stanley then playing in the Northern Premier League First Division. His 12 1/2-year tenure saw the club win three promotions as champions to enter the Football League in 2006. He was also the club's longest ever serving manager. At the time of his departure to Rochdale, Coleman was the third longest serving manager in England, behind Sir Alex Ferguson and Arsène Wenger.

On 24 January 2012, Coleman and his assistant Jimmy Bell were appointed by Rochdale to replace Steve Eyre, who had left the club the previous month. Their contracts were terminated by Rochdale on 21 January 2013 following a poor run in form. In October 2013, Coleman declared his interest in replacing Dave Hockaday as manager of Forest Green Rovers, but returned to Southport as manager on 7 December 2013, with Jimmy Bell once again as his assistant.

He took over as manager of Sligo Rovers in June 2014.

On 18 September 2014, Coleman was confirmed as manager of Accrington Stanley for his second spell with the club. In the 2015–16 season, Coleman led Accrington to a 4th place finish, missing out on automatic promotion on the final game of the season by goal difference. In the play-offs, Accrington lost to AFC Wimbledon after extra time in the semi-finals. In the 2017–18 season, the club won the League Two title to reach the third tier of English football for the first time in the club's history. His achievement earned him the EFL Manager of the Season award for 2017–18.

They were relegated to League Two at the end of the 2022–23 season. On 3 March 2024, Coleman was sacked by Accrington the day after a 4–0 defeat to Wrexham with the club in 16th position. At the time of his departure, he was the longest-serving manager purely in the EFL having been in charge for 9 years and 6 months. Across his two spells with the club, Coleman was in charge for 1,098 matches.

On 5 January 2025, Coleman was appointed manager of League Two side Gillingham on a short-term contract until the end of the season. On 25 March 2025 Coleman left his position as Gillingham manager after achieving just 2 wins in 14 games and leaving Coleman with the lowest win ratio of any permanent manager in the club's history.

On 3 May 2025, Coleman was appointed manager of League of Ireland Premier Division club Waterford. He departed the club on 28 September 2025, following a 2–1 defeat to Shelbourne, having won just 5 of his 20 matches in charge of the club.

On 24 October 2025, Coleman was appointed manager of National League club Aldershot Town.

On 3 July 2026, it was announced that Coleman would re-unite with Leam Richardson at EFL League One club Reading for the first time since their spell together at Accrington Stanley to become their Assistant First-Team Manager alongside Danny Schofield, James Beattie and Mikele Leigertwood.

== Managerial statistics ==
As of match played 25 April 2025

Managerial record by team and tenure
Team	From	To	Record					Ref.
Team	From	To	P	W	D	L	Win %	Ref.
Ashton United	1 August 1997	1 May 1999	91	53	21	17	58.2	
Accrington Stanley	1 May 1999	23 January 2012	587	236	148	203	40.2	
Rochdale	24 January 2012	21 January 2013	52	14	14	24	26.9	
Southport	7 December 2013	3 May 2014	25	8	8	9	32.0	
Sligo Rovers	21 June 2014	18 September 2014	15	7	3	5	46.7	
Accrington Stanley	18 September 2014	3 March 2024	511	200	128	183	39.1	
Gillingham	5 January 2025	25 March 2025	14	2	7	5	14.3	
Waterford	3 May 2025	28 September 2025	20	5	4	11	25.0	
Aldershot Town	24 October 2025	25 April 2026	35	11	3	21	31.4	
Total			1,350	536	336	478	39.7	

== Honours ==
=== Player ===
Individual

- Southport Player of the Year: 1986–87

=== Manager ===
Accrington Stanley

- EFL League Two: 2017–18
- Conference National: 2005–06
- Northern Premier: 2002–03
- Northern Premier League Division One: 1999–2000
- NPL Challenge Cup: 2000–01
- NPL Challenge Shield: 2001–02, 2002–03
- Lancashire FA Challenge Trophy: 2000–01, 2004–05

Individual

- EFL Manager of the Season: 2017–18
- EFL League One Manager of the Month: December 2019, November 2020
- Football / EFL League Two Manager of the Month: September 2015, March 2017, February 2018, March 2018

== See also ==
- List of football managers with the most matches
