= 2005–06 Football Conference =

The 2005–06 season was the 27th season of the Football Conference.

== Overview ==
This season saw the return of Accrington Stanley (albeit as a reformed club) and Hereford United to the Football League. Accrington replaced Oxford United, who had replaced them when they resigned from the League in 1962.

Northwich Victoria, Stafford Rangers and Weymouth returned to the Conference National, the latter for the first time since 1989, whilst St Albans City won promotion to the fifth tier for the first time.

As with the previous season, Grays Athletic were the winners of the FA Trophy.

== Conference National ==
Conference National
- Season: 2005–06
- Champions: Accrington Stanley (1st Football Conference title)
- Promoted: Accrington Stanley, Hereford United
- Relegated to Conference North: Scarborough
- Relegated to Isthmian League Division One North: Canvey Island
- Promoted for the next season: St Albans City, Northwich Victoria, Stafford Rangers, Weymouth
- Matches: 462
- Goals: 1,201 (2.6 per match)
- Top goalscorer: Andy Bishop (York City), 23
- Biggest home win: Grays Athletic – Gravesend & Northfleet 6–1 (16 August 2005); Exeter City – Southport 5–0 (4 March 2006); Forest Green Rovers – Altrincham 5–0 (21 January 2006); Grays Athletic – Scarborough 5–0 (15 October 2005); Grays Athletic – Tamworth 5–0 (4 March 2006); Woking – Tamworth 5–0 (11 February 2006); York City – Altrincham 5–0 (17 September 2005)
- Biggest away win: Scarborough – Grays Athletic 2–7 (10 April 2006); Altrincham – Dagenham & Redbridge 0–5 (10 September 2005); Kidderminster – Grays Athletic 0–5 (28 March 2006)
- Highest scoring: Scarborough – Grays Athletic 2–7 (10 April 2006)
- Longest winning run: ?
- Longest unbeaten run: ?
- Longest losing run: ?
- Highest attendance: Exeter City v Grays Athletic, 6,628 (19 November 2004)
- Lowest attendance: Woking v Canvey Island, 358 (4 April 2006)
- Average attendance: 1,802 (– 6% compared with the previous season)

A total of 22 teams contested the division, including 17 sides from last season, two relegated from the Football League Two, two promoted from the Conference North and one promoted from the Conference South.

=== Promotion and relegation ===
Teams promoted from 2004–05 Conference North

- Southport
- Altrincham

Teams promoted from 2004–05 Conference South

- Grays Athletic

Teams relegated from 2004–05 Football League Two

- Kidderminster Harriers
- Cambridge United

=== League table ===
Pos	Team	Pld	W	D	L	GF	GA	GD	Pts	Promotion or relegation
1	Accrington Stanley (C, P)	42	28	7	7	76	45	+31	91	Promotion to Football League Two
2	Hereford United (O, P)	42	22	14	6	59	33	+26	80	Qualification for the Conference National play-offs
3	Grays Athletic	42	21	13	8	94	55	+39	76	Qualification for the Conference National play-offs
4	Halifax Town	42	21	12	9	55	40	+15	75	Qualification for the Conference National play-offs
5	Morecambe	42	22	8	12	68	41	+27	74	Qualification for the Conference National play-offs
6	Stevenage Borough	42	19	12	11	62	47	+15	69	
7	Exeter City	42	18	9	15	65	48	+17	63	
8	York City	42	17	12	13	63	48	+15	63	
9	Burton Albion	42	16	12	14	50	52	−2	60	
10	Dagenham & Redbridge	42	16	10	16	63	59	+4	58	
11	Woking	42	14	14	14	58	47	+11	56	
12	Cambridge United	42	15	10	17	51	57	−6	55	
13	Aldershot Town	42	16	6	20	61	74	−13	54	
14	Canvey Island (R)	42	13	12	17	47	58	−11	51	Resigned to the Isthmian League Division One North
15	Kidderminster Harriers	42	13	11	18	39	55	−16	50	
16	Gravesend & Northfleet	42	13	10	19	45	57	−12	49	
17	Crawley Town	42	12	11	19	48	55	−7	47	
18	Southport	42	10	10	22	36	68	−32	40	
19	Forest Green Rovers	42	8	14	20	49	62	−13	38	
20	Tamworth	42	8	14	20	32	63	−31	38	
21	Scarborough (R)	42	9	10	23	40	66	−26	37	Demoted to Conference North (Note: Scarborough were demoted to the Conference North due to not fulfilling the Conference's financial guidelines.)
22	Altrincham	42	10	11	21	40	71	−31	23 (Note: Altrincham were deducted 18 points for fielding an ineligible player.)	Reprieved from relegation (Note: Altrincham were reprieved from relegation due to the enlargement of the Conference to 24 teams, the demotion of Scarborough, and the voluntary demotion of Canvey Island. It was the first of three successive seasons in which the club finished in the relegation zone, but were spared demotion due to financial issues at other clubs.)

(C) Champions; (O) Play-off winners; (P) Promoted; (R) Relegated

=== Locations ===
Locations of the Conference National 2005–06 teams
Locations of the Football Conference National London teams 2005–2006

=== Results ===
Home \ Away	ACC	ALD	ALT	BRT	CAM	CAN	CRA	D&R	EXE	FGR	GRN	GRY	HAL	HER	KID	MOR	SCA	SOU	STB	TAM	WOK	YOR
Accrington Stanley		3–2	1–0	2–1	1–0	1–0	4–2	1–0	1–2	2–1	1–1	2–3	1–0	2–1	2–0	2–0	1–0	4–0	1–1	2–1	2–1	2–1
Aldershot	1–4		0–2	1–1	1–3	2–2	3–2	3–1	1–0	2–1	3–2	0–3	3–1	0–1	1–0	2–0	0–1	2–0	2–2	0–2	1–1	2–1
Altrincham	0–1	5–1		1–2	2–1	0–1	1–1	0–5	1–1	2–1	2–2	0–2	1–2	0–1	3–0	2–0	1–1	1–0	1–1	2–0	0–4	0–3
Burton Albion	0–2	1–2	1–0		2–0	1–2	3–1	2–2	2–0	1–0	0–0	1–1	1–2	0–1	1–0	0–4	2–1	0–0	3–1	1–1	1–1	0–0
Cambridge United	1–0	0–2	4–0	2–2		3–1	2–1	1–2	2–1	2–2	1–1	1–1	1–1	2–1	0–2	2–2	2–1	2–1	1–0	2–1	0–2	2–0
Canvey Island	0–2	2–1	1–1	0–2	1–1		1–0	1–2	1–1	1–1	1–2	2–1	0–1	1–1	2–1	3–3	1–0	2–1	1–1	1–2	0–2	1–1
Crawley Town	0–1	2–0	2–0	1–1	1–0	3–1		0–0	0–2	1–0	1–2	1–3	2–2	0–2	2–0	1–3	2–0	2–0	1–2	3–0	2–2	0–1
Dagenham & Redbridge	1–2	2–0	2–4	3–1	1–0	2–2	0–3		2–2	1–1	1–2	1–2	1–0	0–1	3–0	3–1	0–2	3–1	2–2	2–1	1–3	0–2
Exeter City	1–3	4–0	3–1	1–2	4–0	0–2	4–0	3–1		0–0	1–0	1–2	4–2	1–2	1–0	2–0	1–1	5–0	0–2	3–0	1–1	1–3
Forest Green Rovers	1–1	4–2	5–0	1–0	1–0	1–2	2–2	0–3	0–0		0–0	1–2	2–2	2–2	0–0	1–0	5–1	1–2	2–0	1–3	0–3	1–2
Gravesend & Northfleet	1–3	0–3	2–0	0–1	0–0	2–0	1–1	1–3	0–2	2–0		1–3	4–0	1–2	1–2	1–0	0–0	2–1	0–2	2–0	2–0	2–2
Grays Athletic	1–2	2–1	1–1	2–3	5–3	1–2	1–0	0–4	3–0	2–2	6–1		1–1	2–2	2–2	1–2	1–2	1–1	2–2	5–0	2–2	1–1
Halifax Town	2–2	1–1	2–0	1–0	1–0	0–2	2–2	3–0	2–0	1–0	2–0	2–1		2–1	0–0	0–0	1–0	0–2	1–1	4–0	1–0	1–0
Hereford United	2–2	2–1	0–0	2–0	3–0	1–1	2–1	1–1	0–2	1–1	1–1	0–2	1–0		0–1	1–0	4–0	1–1	2–0	1–0	4–0	1–0
Kidderminster Harriers	2–0	1–4	1–1	0–1	1–0	3–2	1–0	3–1	1–2	1–3	0–2	0–5	0–1	1–1		1–0	2–1	1–1	0–0	0–1	2–1	0–0
Morecambe	3–2	5–2	2–0	3–1	0–1	1–0	3–0	2–0	2–2	3–2	3–0	3–0	1–0	2–2	2–0		0–3	0–0	4–1	0–0	3–1	2–0
Scarborough	2–2	2–2	1–2	3–0	1–2	1–2	1–2	0–1	0–1	1–0	3–1	2–7	2–0	0–1	1–1	0–1		0–1	1–1	0–0	1–1	2–2
Southport	2–0	0–1	1–1	3–2	2–2	2–0	0–2	1–2	0–3	3–1	1–0	1–4	0–2	1–2	1–4	0–3	0–2		3–2	1–1	1–0	1–4
Stevenage Borough	3–1	2–1	3–0	2–3	3–1	3–0	2–1	2–1	2–0	2–1	2–0	0–1	1–0	0–0	3–1	1–0	2–0	0–1		3–1	1–1	1–1
Tamworth	1–2	2–1	1–1	1–1	1–1	1–0	0–0	2–2	1–1	0–0	1–0	2–2	1–2	0–1	1–1	0–3	0–1	0–0	2–0		0–1	0–3
Woking	0–1	1–2	3–1	2–2	0–1	1–1	0–0	0–0	1–0	2–1	1–3	1–1	2–2	1–1	0–1	0–1	4–0	1–0	3–2	5–0		2–0
York City	2–4	3–2	5–0	0–1	1–0	2–1	0–0	1–1	4–2	5–1	1–0	1–2	0–2	1–3	2–2	1–1	3–1	0–0	0–1	2–1	2–1	

Updated to match(es) played on unknown. Source: Soccerbase
Legend: Blue = home team win; Yellow = draw; Red = away team win.

=== Play-offs ===
Semifinals; 1st leg 6/7 May; 2nd leg 10/11 May
2nd	Hereford United	1	3	4
5th	Morecambe	1	2	3
3rd	Grays Athletic	2	2	4
4th	Halifax Town	3	2	5

Final at Walkers Stadium, Leicester; 20 May 2006
2nd	Hereford United (a.e.t.)	3
4th	Halifax Town	2

==== Semi-finals ====
7 May 2006
17:35 BST
First leg

Morecambe	1–1	Hereford United
Bentley 22'; McLachlan (yellow card) 53'	Report	Purdie 54' (pen.); Jeannin (yellow card) 67'

Christie Park, Morecambe
Attendance: 5,208
Referee: Richard Hewitt
11 May 2006
19:45 BST
Second leg

Hereford United	3–2 (a.e.t.)	Morecambe
Mkandawire 6'; Williams 13'; Ipoua 107', (yellow card) 113'; Fleetwood (yellow card) 119'; Brown (yellow card) 120+1'	Report	Curtis 8' (pen.); Twiss (yellow card) 45+2', (goal) 53'; Brannan (yellow card) 90+3'; Howard (yellow card) 118'

Edgar Street, Hereford
Attendance: 6,278
Referee: Graham Scott

Hereford United won 4–3 on aggregate.

6 May 2006
15:00 BST
First leg

Halifax Town	3–2	Grays Athletic
Bushell 17'; Sugden 30'; Killeen 32'	Report	Oli 65', 77'

The Shay, Halifax
Attendance: 3,848
Referee: Rob Shoebridge
10 May 2006
19:45 BST
Second leg

Grays Athletic	2–2	Halifax Town
Thurgood (yellow card) 44'; Kightly 56'; Nutter 57'; Bayes (yellow card) 90+5'	Report	Foster 6', 63' (pen.), (yellow card) 65'; Quinn (yellow card) 66'; Atherton (yellow card) 90+5'

New Recreation Ground, Grays
Attendance: 2,886
Referee: Robert Lewis

Halifax Town won 5–4 on aggregate.

==== Final ====
20 May 2006
17:30 BST

Halifax Town	2–3 (a.e.t.)	Hereford United
Killeen 27'; Grant 73'; Senior (yellow card) 110'	Report	Williams 34'; Mkandawire (yellow card) 76'; Ipoua 80', (yellow card) 110'; Jeannin (yellow card) 88'; Green 108', (yellow card) 109'

Walkers Stadium, Leicester
Attendance: 15,499
Referee: Dean Whitestone

=== Top scorers in order of league goals ===
Pos	Player	Club	League	Play-offs	FA Cup	FA Trophy	LDV	Total
1	(England) Andy Bishop	York City	23	0	2	1	0	26
2	(England) Justin Richards	Woking	21	0	0	0	1	22
3	(England) Danny Carlton	Morecambe	17	0	1	0	0	18
=	(England) Colin Little	Altrincham	17	0	0	0	0	17
5	(Jamaica) Clayton Donaldson	York City	16	0	1	0	0	17
6	(Wales) Chris Moore	Dagenham & Redbridge	15	0	2	3	0	20
7	(England) Michael Kightly	Grays Athletic	14	1	1	2	0	17
=	(England) Paul Mullin	Accrington Stanley	14	0	0	3	0	17
9	(England) Glenn Poole	Grays Athletic	13	0	1	4	0	18
=	(England) Lee Phillips	Exeter City	13	0	0	3	1	17
=	(England) Ian Craney	Accrington Stanley	13	0	0	3	0	16
=	(England) Gary Roberts	Accrington Stanley	13	0	2	0	0	15
=	(Republic of Ireland) Daryl Clare	Burton Albion	13	0	0	0	0	13

== Conference North ==
Conference North
- Season: 2005–06
- Champions: Northwich Victoria (1st Football Conference North title)
- Direct promotion: Northwich Victoria
- Promoted through play-offs: Stafford Rangers
- Relegated to Level 7: Hednesford
- Promoted for the next season: Blyth Spartans, Farsley Celtic
- Matches: 462
- Goals: 1,326 (2.87 per match)
- Biggest home win: Northwich Victoria – Hednesford 8–0 (25 February 2006)
- Biggest away win: Hednesford – Harrogate 0–4 (19 November 1005); Hednesford – Worcester City 0–4 (25 March 2006); Moor Green – Nuneaton 0–4 (15 October 2005); Worksop Town – Nuneaton 0–4 (18 February 2006)
- Highest scoring: Redditch – Workington 3–6 (22 October 2005)
- Longest winning run: ?
- Longest unbeaten run: ?
- Longest losing run: ?
- Highest attendance: ?
- Lowest attendance: ?
- Average attendance: ?

A total of 22 teams contested the division, including 17 sides from last season, one promoted from Southern Football League, two promoted from the Northern Premier League and two relegated from the Conference National.

=== Promotion and relegation ===
Teams promoted from 2004–05 Northern Premier League

- Hyde United
- Workington

Teams promoted from 2004–05 Southern Football League

- Hednesford Town

Teams relegated from 2004–05 Conference National

- Northwich Victoria
- Leigh RMI

=== League table ===
Pos	Team	Pld	W	D	L	GF	GA	GD	Pts	Promotion or relegation
1	Northwich Victoria (C, P)	42	29	5	8	97	49	+48	92	Promotion to Conference National
2	Stafford Rangers (O, P)	42	25	10	7	68	34	+34	85	Qualification for the Conference North play-offs
3	Nuneaton Borough	42	22	11	9	68	43	+25	77	Qualification for the Conference North play-offs
4	Droylsden	42	20	12	10	80	56	+24	72	Qualification for the Conference North play-offs
5	Harrogate Town	42	22	5	15	66	56	+10	71	Qualification for the Conference North play-offs
6	Kettering Town	42	19	10	13	63	49	+14	67	
7	Stalybridge Celtic	42	19	9	14	74	54	+20	66	
8	Worcester City	42	16	14	12	58	46	+12	62	
9	Moor Green	42	15	16	11	67	64	+3	61	
10	Hinckley United	42	14	16	12	60	55	+5	58	
11	Hyde United	42	15	11	16	68	61	+7	56	
12	Hucknall Town	42	14	13	15	56	54	+2	55	
13	Workington	42	14	13	15	60	62	−2	55	
14	Barrow	42	12	11	19	62	67	−5	47	
15	Lancaster City	42	12	11	19	52	66	−14	47	
16	Gainsborough Trinity	42	11	13	18	45	65	−20	46	
17	Alfreton Town	42	10	15	17	46	58	−12	45	
18	Vauxhall Motors	42	12	7	23	50	71	−21	43	
19	Worksop Town	42	10	11	21	46	71	−25	41	
20	Redditch United	42	9	12	21	52	78	−26	39	
21	Leigh RMI	42	9	13	20	45	79	−34	39 (Note: Leigh RMI were deducted 1 point for fielding an ineligible player.)	Reprieved from relegation (Note: Leigh RMI were reprieved from relegation due to Canvey Island's voluntary three-level demotion.)
22	Hednesford Town (R)	42	7	14	21	42	87	−45	35	Relegation to the Northern Premier League Premier Division

(C) Champions; (O) Play-off winners; (P) Promoted; (R) Relegated

=== Locations ===
Locations of the Football Conference North 2005–2006 teams

=== Results ===
Home \ Away	ALF	BRW	DRO	GAI	HAR	HED	HIN	HUC	HYD	KET	LNC	LEI	MOG	NOR	NUN	RED	STA	STL	VAU	WRC	WRK	WKS
Alfreton Town		2–1	1–3	1–2	4–1	3–2	1–1	1–1	2–0	1–1	0–2	1–1	1–1	2–4	1–0	2–1	2–1	0–0	1–2	1–0	1–3	2–1
Barrow	2–2		2–0	3–1	3–1	3–1	2–5	2–0	2–2	0–1	1–4	3–1	2–2	1–1	0–3	1–1	1–1	4–2	0–2	0–2	6–1	1–0
Droylsden	1–0	2–2		1–2	2–1	1–1	3–1	2–3	1–0	3–1	6–1	4–1	3–0	4–3	2–2	2–1	2–1	1–0	4–0	3–0	2–3	3–1
Gainsborough Trinity	2–2	3–2	2–2		0–2	1–1	1–2	3–2	0–3	0–2	1–0	2–1	2–2	1–2	1–2	2–2	1–1	1–0	1–1	0–1	0–0	2–0
Harrogate Town	1–0	2–1	1–1	2–0		2–3	2–1	1–0	1–0	1–1	3–1	3–0	3–0	0–2	2–0	1–1	0–2	1–0	2–1	4–1	1–1	2–0
Hednesford Town	1–0	0–3	0–1	1–1	0–4		3–4	1–1	0–2	2–2	1–0	1–3	1–2	1–4	0–0	1–1	0–2	1–1	0–1	0–4	0–0	2–1
Hinckley United	2–2	1–0	1–1	1–0	1–3	1–2		3–1	2–1	1–1	3–3	5–1	1–2	1–3	0–1	1–1	0–1	1–1	2–1	1–3	0–0	3–0
Hucknall Town	1–0	2–1	2–0	4–1	4–1	2–2	0–2		1–3	1–1	0–0	2–2	2–2	3–2	0–1	4–0	0–2	2–1	1–2	1–2	1–0	0–0
Hyde United	2–3	2–2	2–2	2–0	3–1	4–2	0–1	0–0		3–0	2–4	3–3	3–2	1–3	1–0	1–3	1–3	1–3	2–3	4–0	1–1	1–1
Kettering Town	1–0	1–3	1–0	1–2	0–2	4–0	2–2	0–0	3–2		2–0	4–0	0–3	2–0	3–0	4–0	0–1	4–1	1–0	2–1	2–1	1–0
Lancaster City	2–2	3–0	2–2	2–3	2–1	1–0	2–2	0–1	1–3	0–1		2–0	3–3	1–2	1–1	1–0	1–1	2–2	1–0	0–0	0–1	2–1
Leigh RMI	0–0	1–1	0–1	0–0	3–1	0–0	1–0	2–1	1–1	0–2	1–2		1–3	2–1	1–0	2–1	1–3	2–1	1–1	1–4	0–1	0–1
Moor Green	0–0	1–1	1–1	1–1	2–2	1–2	1–1	2–4	1–2	1–1	3–1	4–1		1–2	0–4	2–1	0–1	1–1	2–1	1–1	1–4	1–0
Northwich Victoria	1–1	2–0	2–1	2–0	3–0	8–0	2–0	2–0	1–2	4–1	3–2	1–0	1–1		2–2	5–1	3–1	1–0	3–1	0–1	4–1	4–1
Nuneaton Borough	1–0	2–1	2–2	3–1	4–0	3–2	2–0	2–2	1–0	2–2	3–0	3–1	2–2	1–2		2–1	1–1	0–0	3–2	0–0	3–1	3–1
Redditch United	1–0	2–1	4–1	1–1	1–3	1–2	1–1	1–1	1–1	2–1	0–1	1–2	0–1	1–2	3–0		0–1	1–4	3–0	2–2	3–6	0–3
Stafford Rangers	1–0	3–1	0–0	3–0	0–1	1–1	2–3	2–0	1–0	1–3	3–0	0–0	1–3	2–0	2–0	3–0		1–0	3–0	1–1	2–2	4–2
Stalybridge Celtic	3–0	2–1	1–1	1–0	3–1	3–0	1–1	2–1	1–2	2–0	2–1	6–1	4–1	3–3	2–0	5–1	2–3		2–1	2–3	2–1	2–1
Vauxhall Motors	3–1	0–1	2–4	1–2	0–2	0–0	0–1	0–2	0–2	1–1	1–0	4–4	1–2	0–3	1–2	1–2	1–3	4–2		1–0	2–1	5–2
Worcester City	2–2	1–0	1–2	2–1	2–0	6–2	0–0	0–1	2–2	2–0	2–0	2–0	0–2	0–1	0–1	2–2	1–1	0–1	0–0		1–1	1–1
Workington	2–0	0–0	2–1	2–0	2–4	2–0	1–1	1–1	1–0	3–2	1–1	0–0	1–4	5–2	0–2	1–2	0–1	1–2	1–2	2–2		1–2
Worksop Town	1–1	2–1	3–2	1–1	1–0	3–3	0–0	2–1	1–1	2–1	2–0	3–3	0–2	1–2	0–4	1–1	0–1	2–1	1–1	0–3	1–2	

Updated to match(es) played on unknown. Source: Sky Sports Football Yearbook 2006–2007. Glenda Rollin & Jack Rollin (eds.). Headline, 2006.
Legend: Blue = home team win; Yellow = draw; Red = away team win.

=== Play-offs ===
Semifinals
2nd	Stafford Rangers	1
5th	Harrogate Town	0
3rd	Nuneaton Borough	0
4th	Droylsden	1

Final
2nd	Stafford Rangers (pen.)	1 (5)
4th	Droylsden	1 (3)

==== Semifinals ====
1 May 2006

Nuneaton Borough	0–1	Droylsden
	Report	Acton 2'

Manor Park, Nuneaton
Attendance: 2,005
2 May 2006

Stafford Rangers	1–0	Harrogate Town
Gibson 63'	Report

Marston Road, Stafford
Attendance: 1,665

==== Play-Off Final ====
6 May 2006
15:00 BST

Stafford Rangers	1–1 (a.e.t.)	Droylsden
Grayson 29'	Report	Fearns 48'
Penalties
Grayson (penalty scored)	5–3	(penalty missed) Fearns

Pirelli Stadium, Burton
Attendance: 2,704

=== Topscorers ===
Pos	Player	Club	League	Play-offs	FA Cup	FA Trophy	Total
1	(England) Jonny Allan	Northwich Victoria	24	0	1	6	31

== Conference South ==
Conference South
- Season: 2005–06
- Champions: Weymouth (1st Football Conference South title)
- Direct promotion: Weymouth
- Promoted through play-offs: St Albans City
- Relegated to Level 7: Carshalton Athletic, Maidenhead United
- Promoted for the next season: Bedford Town, Braintree Town, Fisher Athletic, Salisbury City
- Matches: 462
- Goals: 1,319 (2.85 per match)
- Biggest home win: Bognor Regis – Maidenhead 8–1 (8 November 2005)
- Biggest away win: Basingstoke – Cambridge City 0–5 (25 February 2006); Dorchester – Sutton 0–5 (29 August 2005); Histon – St Albans City 0–5 (11 January 2006); Maidenhead – Cambridge City 0–5 (20 August 2005); Weston-super-Mare – Thurrock 0–5 (1 October 2005)
- Highest scoring: Histon – Farnborough 3–6 (15 October 2005)
- Longest winning run: ?
- Longest unbeaten run: ?
- Longest losing run: ?
- Highest attendance: ?
- Lowest attendance: ?
- Average attendance: ?

A total of 22 teams contested the division, including 18 sides from last season, two promoted from the Isthmian League, one promoted from the Southern Football League and one relegated from Conference National.

=== Promotion and relegation ===
Teams promoted from 2004–05 Southern Football League

- Histon

Teams promoted from 2004–05 Isthmian League

- Yeading
- Eastleigh

Teams relegated from 2004–05 Conference National

- Farnborough Town

=== League table ===
Pos	Team	Pld	W	D	L	GF	GA	GD	Pts	Promotion or relegation
1	Weymouth (C, P)	42	30	4	8	80	34	+46	90 (Note: Weymouth were deducted 4 points for fielding an ineligible player.)	Promotion to Conference National
2	St Albans City (O, P)	42	27	5	10	94	47	+47	86	Qualification for the Conference South play-offs
3	Farnborough Town	42	23	9	10	65	41	+24	78	Qualification for the Conference South play-offs
4	Lewes	42	21	10	11	78	57	+21	73	(Note: Lewes were barred from the play-offs due to ground issues.)
5	Histon	42	21	8	13	70	56	+14	71	Qualification for the Conference South play-offs
6	Havant & Waterlooville	42	21	10	11	64	48	+16	70 (Note: Havant & Waterlooville were deducted 3 points for fielding an ineligible player.)	
7	Cambridge City	42	20	10	12	78	46	+32	67 (Note: Cambridge City were deducted 3 points for fielding an ineligible player.)	
8	Eastleigh	42	21	3	18	65	58	+7	66	
9	Welling United	42	16	17	9	59	44	+15	65	
10	Thurrock	42	16	10	16	60	60	0	58	
11	Dorchester Town	42	16	7	19	60	73	−13	55	
12	Bognor Regis Town	42	12	13	17	54	55	−1	49	
13	Sutton United	42	13	10	19	48	61	−13	49	
14	Weston-super-Mare	42	14	7	21	56	88	−32	49	
15	Bishop's Stortford	42	11	15	16	55	63	−8	48	
16	Yeading	42	13	8	21	47	62	−15	47	
17	Eastbourne Borough	42	10	16	16	51	60	−9	46	
18	Newport County	42	12	8	22	50	67	−17	44	
19	Basingstoke Town	42	12	8	22	47	72	−25	44	
20	Hayes	42	11	9	22	47	60	−13	42	
21	Carshalton Athletic (R)	42	8	16	18	42	68	−26	40	Relegation to the Isthmian League Premier Division
22	Maidenhead United (R)	42	8	9	25	49	99	−50	31 (Note: Maidenhead United were deducted 2 points for fielding an ineligible player.)	Relegation to the Southern League Premier Division

(C) Champions; (O) Play-off winners; (P) Promoted; (R) Relegated

=== Locations ===
Locations of the Football Conference South 2005–2006 teams
Locations of the Football Conference South London teams 2005–2006

=== Results ===
Home \ Away	BAS	BST	BOG	CAM	CAR	DOR	EAB	EAS	FAR	H&W	HAY	HIS	LEW	MDH	NPC	SAC	SUT	THU	WEL	WSM	WEY	YEA
Basingstoke Town		1–1	2–3	0–5	2–1	2–0	2–2	0–1	0–1	2–1	1–1	0–1	1–5	0–1	1–0	1–1	2–0	0–3	2–2	2–1	0–3	0–4
Bishop's Stortford	1–1		2–1	1–3	3–3	5–2	0–1	4–1	1–1	1–3	1–0	5–0	0–3	1–0	0–1	1–3	2–1	2–2	1–1	2–3	0–2	2–1
Bognor Regis Town	2–1	2–2		4–2	1–1	1–1	2–1	2–0	0–1	0–1	1–1	3–1	2–2	8–1	1–1	2–1	0–0	0–1	0–0	0–1	0–2	0–2
Cambridge City	1–0	1–1	2–0		0–0	1–2	2–3	2–1	0–2	0–0	3–1	3–1	0–2	3–0	0–2	4–3	3–0	6–0	0–0	3–0	1–3	0–2
Carshalton Athletic	1–2	0–0	1–1	0–2		3–1	2–2	1–3	2–2	1–3	1–2	0–0	2–2	0–1	1–0	0–2	0–0	0–0	1–0	1–1	2–1	2–2
Dorchester Town	2–1	1–3	3–5	1–0	2–0		3–0	1–3	1–1	1–1	2–2	0–3	2–2	1–3	2–2	1–4	0–5	2–0	0–3	1–2	2–0	4–0
Eastbourne Borough	2–3	1–1	0–0	1–1	1–1	1–1		0–1	0–1	2–2	0–0	1–1	3–1	3–3	2–0	1–1	2–1	0–0	1–1	1–2	0–2	2–1
Eastleigh	0–3	0–1	1–0	1–1	3–1	1–2	2–1		2–0	2–6	2–1	1–2	2–0	2–1	2–0	0–2	2–0	3–0	1–3	4–1	2–0	0–3
Farnborough Town	1–0	3–0	2–1	0–3	4–0	0–1	2–3	1–0		4–1	0–0	0–2	2–2	3–1	2–1	0–0	2–1	0–0	1–0	5–0	0–1	1–0
Havant & Waterlooville	2–0	2–2	1–0	1–1	1–1	1–0	1–0	2–1	1–0		1–1	3–1	1–0	2–1	1–2	0–1	0–1	1–2	0–0	3–2	2–1	3–0
Hayes	1–2	2–0	1–2	2–0	1–2	0–1	0–2	1–0	0–1	1–2		2–1	2–2	2–1	3–2	0–1	2–1	0–1	1–3	4–1	1–2	0–1
Histon	2–0	3–2	2–2	1–0	0–1	4–1	3–1	1–0	3–6	3–1	2–3		1–1	3–0	2–3	0–5	3–0	3–1	1–1	1–1	2–1	1–0
Lewes	3–0	2–1	1–1	2–2	2–1	3–2	1–0	1–2	6–2	0–2	2–1	0–3		2–2	1–0	0–2	2–0	0–0	2–1	5–2	2–3	1–0
Maidenhead United	0–0	2–2	1–2	0–5	0–2	2–3	2–6	2–2	1–2	3–1	2–1	1–4	0–1		1–1	0–4	2–0	1–3	2–4	2–4	0–0	1–2
Newport County	2–0	1–0	1–0	0–2	4–1	0–2	1–1	0–2	1–2	2–3	1–0	0–1	2–3	3–0		1–3	1–0	3–4	2–2	2–2	0–3	1–3
St Albans City	3–1	3–0	2–0	2–4	3–0	2–0	5–0	2–4	2–2	2–0	1–0	1–0	2–0	4–0	1–0		3–1	3–2	3–1	1–2	4–0	5–2
Sutton United	0–1	1–1	1–0	3–2	1–1	1–0	2–0	0–3	1–0	1–1	2–1	1–1	1–5	4–1	1–1	4–0		1–1	2–1	1–2	0–3	0–0
Thurrock	4–1	2–1	3–0	0–3	2–1	0–1	1–0	3–1	0–2	0–2	1–1	1–2	2–3	1–2	4–2	2–1	5–3		1–1	0–1	1–2	0–1
Welling United	3–2	0–0	2–0	1–1	2–0	4–3	1–2	2–1	1–0	2–2	1–0	1–1	2–1	3–3	1–1	3–1	0–0	1–1		1–0	1–0	0–1
Weston-super-Mare	4–3	0–1	2–2	1–3	2–0	0–4	1–0	1–4	1–1	1–3	1–1	1–4	1–2	1–1	2–1	3–1	2–3	0–5	0–1		1–3	0–3
Weymouth	1–1	3–1	2–0	1–1	4–0	1–0	2–1	2–0	1–2	1–0	5–1	1–0	2–0	4–0	4–0	3–2	3–1	2–0	2–1	2–1		1–1
Yeading	0–4	0–0	0–3	1–2	3–4	0–1	1–1	2–2	0–3	2–0	2–3	1–0	0–3	0–2	1–2	2–2	0–2	1–1	1–0	1–2	0–1	

Updated to match(es) played on unknown. Source: Sky Sports Football Yearbook 2006–2007. Glenda Rollin & Jack Rollin (eds.). Headline, 2006.
Legend: Blue = home team win; Yellow = draw; Red = away team win.

=== Play-offs ===
Semifinals
2nd	St Albans City (Note: Lewes did not take part in the play-offs as they could not be promoted to the Conference National due to ground grading issues. As a result, St Albans City were given a bye to the play-off final.)	W/O
3rd	Farnborough Town	0
5th	Histon	3

Final
2nd	St Albans City	2
5th	Histon	0

==== Semifinal ====
1 May 2006

Farnborough Town	0–3	Histon
		Kennedy 15', 37'; Jackman 69'

Cherrywood Road, Farnborough
Attendance: 1,081

==== Play-Off Final ====
7 May 2006
14:00

St Albans City	2–0	Histon
Clarke 7'; Hakim 67'	Report

Broadhall Way, Stevenage
Attendance: 3,175
Referee: J Farries

=== Topscorers ===
Pos	Player	Club	League	Play-offs	FA Cup	FA Trophy	Total
1	(England) Paul Booth	Cambridge City	24	0	6	2	32
