= List of Accrington Stanley F.C. players =

== Key ==
Symbol	Meaning
†	Currently playing for Accrington as of the 2012–13 season
‡	Player has been capped at full international level
DF	Defender
FW	Forward
GK	Goalkeeper
MF	Midfielder

- Substitute appearances are included in the League apps column.
- Years indicate date of first and last Accrington Stanley appearance.

== List of players ==
As of 5 August 2012

Name	Nationality	Position	Accrington career	League Apps	League Goals	Notes
Mauro Almeida	Portugal	DF	2007	5	0	
Pádraig Amond	Republic of Ireland	FW	2011–2012	42	7	
Godwin Antwi	Spain	DF	2007	9	0	
Kenny Arthur	Scotland	GK	2007–2009	66	0	
Rikki Bains	England	DF	2006–2007	3	0	
Charlie Barnett †	England	MF	2010–	82	3	
Jonathan Bateson	England	DF	2010–2011	12	0	
Jay Bell	England	DF	2007–2009	8	0	
Thomas Bender	Wales	DF	2011–2012	2	0	
Adam Black	England	FW	2009–2010	1	0	
Gregg Blundell	England	FW	2008	2	0	
Romuald Boco	Benin ‡	MF	2006–2008	43	3	
Rory Boulding	England	FW	2010–2011	15	2	
Dean Bouzanis	Australia	GK	2009–2010	14	0	
Graham Branch	England	MF	2007–2008	22	0	
David Brown	England	FW	2006–2008	31	5	
Alan Burton	England	MF	2009–2012	2	0	
Joel Byrom	England	MF	2006–2007	1	0	
Paul Carden	England	MF	2007–2008	4	0	
Marcus Carver †	England	FW	2011–	2	0	
Peter Cavanagh	England	DF	2006–2009	74	6	
Kieran Charnock	England	DF	2008–2009	34	0	
Alex Cisak	Australia	GK	2010–2011	21	0	
Jamie Clarke	England	FW	2008	15	5	
Danny Coid	England	MF	2011–2012	21	1	
Ian Craney	England	MF	2006–2012	98	21	
Roscoe D'Sane	England	FW	2007–2008	22	7	
Billy Dennehy	Republic of Ireland	MF	2007–2008	7	0	
Jamie Devitt	Republic of Ireland	MF	2012	16	2	
Luke Dobie	England	MF	2011–2012	4	0	
Sean Doherty	England	MF	2006–2007	20	1	
Phil Doughty	England	DF	2008	3	0	
Adam Dugdale	England	DF	2006	2	0	
Ian Dunbavin †	England	GK	2006–	127	0	
Phil Edwards	England	DF	2006–2011	200	23	
Rob Elliot	England	GK	2006–2007	7	0	
Micah Evans	England	FW	2011–2012	23	3	
Stuart Fleetwood	Wales	FW	2007	3	0	
Wes Fletcher	England	FW	2011	10	2	
Johnny Flynn	Northern Ireland	DF	2009–2010	8	0	
Terry Gornell	England	FW	2008–2011	51	17	
Bobby Grant	England	FW	2006–2012	73	18	
Tony Grant	England	MF	2007	6	0	
Rostyn Griffiths	Australia	MF	2008	13	1	
Kurtis Guthrie	Jersey	FW	2011–2012	13	0	
Jay Harris	England	MF	2006–2008	78	7	
Will Hatfield †	England	MF	2011–	17	3	
Sean Hessey	England	DF	2010–2012	58	3	
Kallum Higginbotham	England	MF	2008–2009	12	0	
Ryan Hopper †	England	MF	2012–	4	0	
Bryan Hughes	England	MF	2011–2012	21	3	
Joe Jacobson	Wales	DF	2006–2011	32	3	
Luke Joyce †	England	MF	2009–	111	4	
Adam Kay	England	MF	2009	3	0	
Przemysław Kazimierczak	Poland	GK	2007	8	0	
Billy Kee	Northern Ireland	FW	2009–2010	37	9	
Darran Kempson	England	DF	2008–2010	48	2	
Rob Kiernan	Republic of Ireland	DF	2012	3	0	
Chris King	England	DF	2008–2009	28	0	
Gary King	England	FW	2009–2010	8	1	
Mark King	England	DF	2008	6	0	
John Paul Kissock	England	MF	2008–2009	5	0	
Tom Lees	England	DF	2009–2010	39	0	
Michael Liddle †	Republic of Ireland	DF	2012–	12	0	
Craig Lindfield †	England	FW	2009–	75	6	
Kevin Long	Republic of Ireland	DF	2010–2012	39	4	
Craig Mahon	Republic of Ireland	FW	2008	2	0	
Andy Mangan	England	FW	2006–2008	41	5	
David Mannix	England	MF	2006–2008	13	0	
Alan Martin	Scotland	GK	2009	7	0	
David Martin	England	GK	2007	10	0	
James McCarten	England	DF	2010	1	0	
Sean McConville	England	MF	2009–2011, 2015–2024	76	14	
Lee McEvilly	Northern Ireland ‡	FW	2007–2008	11	0	
Leighton McGivern	England	FW	2006–2008	19	2	
Chris McGrail	England	FW	2007	3	0	
Kevin McIntyre	England	MF	2011–2012	45	2	
John Miles	England	FW	2007–2010	95	6	
Kern Miller	England	DF	2011	2	0	
Louis Moult	England	FW	2011	4	0	
John Mullin	England	MF	2008–2010	32	0	
Paul Mullin	England	FW	2006–2009	129	33	
Sean Murdoch	Scotland	GK	2011–2012	13	0	
Colin Murdock	Northern Ireland ‡	DF	2008–2009	23	1	
Peter Murphy †	England	DF	2007–	66	4	
Julien N'Da	Ivory Coast	DF	2006	3	0	
Lee Nicholls	England	GK	2012	9	0	
Aristote Nsiala †	DR Congo	DF	2012–	19	0	
Fola Onibuje	Nigeria	FW	2008	5	0	
Andy Owens	England	DF	2010–2011	3	0	
Andy Parkinson	England	MF	2010–2011	18	2	
Andrew Procter	England	MF	2006–2012	235	29	
Ray Putterill	England	MF	2010–2011	24	0	
Leam Richardson †	England	DF	2006–	100	2	
Gary Roberts	England	MF	2006–2007	14	8	
Mark Roberts	England	DF	2007–2008	34	0	
Alan Rogers	England	DF	2007	6	0	
Jimmy Ryan	Republic of Ireland	MF	2008–2011	129	22	
Andrew Smith	England	FW	2006–2009	2	0	
Michael Smith	England	FW	2012	6	3	
Tom Smyth	England	DF	2010–2011	4	0	
James Spray	England	FW	2011	3	0	
Jayden Stockley	England	FW	2011	9	3	
Michael Symes	England	FW	2009–2010	48	14	
Nat Taylor	England	FW	2011–2012	2	0	
Aswad Thomas	England	DF	2008	13	2	
Andy Todd	England	MF	2006–2008	67	10	
Chris Turner	England	MF	2008–2011	60	2	
Danny Ventre	England	DF	2006–2007	6	0	
Sean Webb	Northern Ireland ‡	DF	2007–2008	18	0	
Michael Welch	England	DF	2006–2007	31	3	
Shaun Whalley	England	MF	2006–2008	51	5	
Robbie Williams	England	DF	2006–2009	92	4	
Liam Willis	England	DF	2012	2	0	
Dean Winnard †	England	DF	2009–	119	2	
David Worrall	England	MF	2008	4	0	
