= 2011–12 Accrington Stanley F.C. season =

Accrington Stanley
2011–12 season
- Chairman: Ilyas Khan
- Manager: John Coleman (until 24 January 2012); Leam Richardson (Caretaker manager until 15 February 2012); Paul Cook
- League Two: 14th
- FA Cup: 1st round
- League Cup: 1st round
- Football League Trophy: 2nd round (North)
- Top goalscorer: League: Pádraig Amond (7); All: Pádraig Amond (8)
- Highest home attendance: League: 3,275 vs Shrewsbury Town (21 Apr 2012); All: 3,275 vs Shrewsbury Town (21 Apr 2012)
- Lowest home attendance: League: 1,308 vs Dagenham & Redbridge (31 Jan 2012); All: 1,069 vs Carlisle United (6 Sep 2011)
Home colours	Away colours

During the 2011–12 season, Accrington Stanley F.C. competed in League Two. This was their 6th season in the Football League and 14th was their second highest position.

It was a year of transition for Stanley with long serving manager John Coleman and his assistant Jimmy Bell leaving the club to join League One side Rochdale. Former player Paul Cook was appointed the new manager with his assistant being Leam Richardson, who was caretaker manager in the intervening spell.

The end of the season saw chairman Ilyas Khan step down. He said he had been racially abused since taking over the club in March 2011.

Stanley also made the news in October 2011, when on-loan defender Tom Bender was knocked out in a collision with team mate Ian Dunbavin and Tranmere Rovers striker Lucas Akins in a Football League Trophy tie. Consequently, the game was abandoned with Tranmere leading 2–1. Bender was treated for 30 minutes on the pitch before being taken to hospital where he regained consciousness and made a full recovery.

== League table ==
Pos	Team	Pld	W	D	L	GF	GA	GD	Pts
12	Port Vale	46	20	9	17	68	60	+8	59 (Note: On 9 March Port Vale were deducted ten points for entering administration.)
13	Bristol Rovers	46	15	12	19	60	70	−10	57
14	Accrington Stanley	46	14	15	17	54	66	−12	57
15	Morecambe	46	14	14	18	63	57	+6	56
16	AFC Wimbledon	46	15	9	22	62	78	−16	54

Updated to match(es) played on 5 May 2012. Source: BBC Sport
Rules for classification: 1) Points; 2) Goal difference; 3) Number of goals scored

== Squad statistics ==
=== Appearances and goals ===
No.	Pos	Nat	Player	Total		League Two		FA Cup		League Cup		FL Trophy	
No.	Pos	Nat	Player	Apps	Goals	Apps	Goals	Apps	Goals	Apps	Goals	Apps	Goals
1	GK	(Scotland) SCO	Sean Murdoch	15	0	12+1	0	1+0	0	1+0	0	0+0	0
2	DF	(England) ENG	Danny Coid	23	1	16+5	1	1+0	0	0+0	0	1+0	0
3	DF	(England) ENG	Dean Winnard	34	1	30+0	1	1+0	0	1+0	0	2+0	0
4	DF	(England) ENG	Sean Hessey	20	2	17+0	2	1+0	0	0+1	0	0+1	0
5	DF	(Wales) WAL	Aristote Nsiala (on loan)	19	0	19+0	0	0+0	0	0+0	0	0+0	0
5	DF	(England) ENG	Kern Miller (on loan)	3	0	2+0	0	0+0	0	1+0	0	0+0	0
6	DF	(Ireland) EIR	Rob Kiernan (on loan)	3	0	3+0	0	0+0	0	0+0	0	0+0	0
6	MF	(England) ENG	Andrew Procter	29	3	25+0	2	1+0	0	1+0	0	2+0	1
7	FW	(England) ENG	Craig Lindfield	42	5	29+10	4	0+0	0	1+0	0	1+1	1
8	MF	(England) ENG	Charlie Barnett	44	1	27+15	1	1+0	0	1+0	0	0+0	0
9	FW	(England) ENG	Kurtis Guthrie	16	0	6+7	0	0+0	0	1+0	0	2+0	0
10	MF	(England) ENG	Ian Craney	25	1	7+15	1	0+0	0	1+0	0	2+0	0
11	MF	(England) ENG	Luke Joyce	47	3	43+0	2	1+0	1	1+0	0	2+0	0
12	DF	(England) ENG	Peter Murphy	41	4	36+2	4	0+0	0	0+1	0	2+0	0
13	MF	(England) ENG	Luke Dobie (on loan)	5	0	0+4	0	0+1	0	0+0	0	0+0	0
14	MF	(England) ENG	Kevin McIntyre	49	2	44+1	2	1+0	0	1+0	0	2+0	0
15	MF	(England) ENG	Alan Burton	1	0	0+1	0	0+0	0	0+0	0	0+0	0
16	FW	(England) ENG	Bobby Grant (on loan)	8	3	8+0	3	0+0	0	0+0	0	0+0	0
16	DF	(England) ENG	Leam Richardson	1	0	0+1	0	0+0	0	0+0	0	0+0	0
17	MF	(Ireland) EIR	Jamie Devitt (on loan)	16	2	15+1	2	0+0	0	0+0	0	0+0	0
17	DF	(Ireland) EIR	Kevin Long (on loan)	26	4	24+0	4	0+0	0	1+0	0	1+0	0
18	DF	(England) ENG	Liam Willis	2	0	1+1	0	0+0	0	0+0	0	0+0	0
18	FW	(England) ENG	Nat Taylor	3	0	1+1	0	0+0	0	0+1	0	0+0	0
19	FW	(England) ENG	Louis Moult (on loan)	5	0	1+3	0	0+0	0	0+0	0	1+0	0
19	FW	(England) ENG	James Spray (on loan)	3	0	3+0	0	0+0	0	0+0	0	0+0	0
19	FW	(England) ENG	Micah Evans (on loan)	24	3	14+9	3	1+0	0	0+0	0	0+0	0
20	DF	(Wales) WAL	Tom Bender (on loan)	4	0	0+2	0	0+1	0	0+0	0	1+0	0
21	FW	(England) ENG	Wes Fletcher (on loan)	12	2	10+0	2	0+0	0	0+0	0	0+2	0
21	FW	(England) ENG	Michael Smith (on loan)	6	3	4+2	3	0+0	0	0+0	0	0+0	0
21	FW	(England) ENG	Jayden Stockley (on loan)	10	3	5+4	3	1+0	0	0+0	0	0+0	0
22	GK	(England) ENG	Lee Nicholls (on loan)	9	0	9+0	0	0+0	0	0+0	0	0+0	0
23	FW	(Ireland) EIR	Padraig Amond (on loan)	45	8	37+5	7	0+1	0	0+0	0	1+1	1
24	MF	(England) ENG	Ryan Hopper	4	0	1+3	0	0+0	0	0+0	0	0+0	0
25	GK	(England) ENG	Ian Dunbavin	27	0	25+0	0	0+0	0	0+0	0	2+0	0
27	MF	(England) ENG	Bryan Hughes	22	3	15+6	3	1+0	0	0+0	0	0+0	0
29	DF	(Ireland) EIR	Michael Liddle (on loan)	12	0	12+0	0	0+0	0	0+0	0	0+0	0
30	DF	(England) ENG	Will Hatfield	17	3	4+13	3	0+0	0	0+0	0	0+0	0
37	FW	(England) ENG	Marcus Carver	2	0	1+1	0	0+0	0	0+0	0	0+0	0

=== Top scorers ===
Place	Position	Nation	Number	Name	League Two	FA Cup	League Cup	FL Trophy	Total
1	FW	(Republic of Ireland)	23	Padraig Amond	7	0	0	1	8
2	FW	(England)	7	Craig Lindfield	4	0	0	1	5
3	DF	(Republic of Ireland)	17	Kevin Long	4	0	0	0	4
=	DF	(England)	12	Peter Murphy	4	0	0	0	4
5	FW	(England)	21	Jayden Stockley	3	0	0	0	3
=	FW	(England)	21	Michael Smith	3	0	0	0	3
=	FW	(England)	19	Micah Evans	3	0	0	0	3
=	MF	(England)	30	Will Hatfield	3	0	0	0	3
=	MF	(England)	16	Bobby Grant	3	0	0	0	3
=	MF	(England)	27	Bryan Hughes	3	0	0	0	3
=	MF	(England)	6	Andrew Procter	2	0	0	1	3
=	MF	(England)	11	Luke Joyce	2	1	0	0	3
13	FW	(England)	21	Wes Fletcher	2	0	0	0	2
=	DF	(England)	4	Sean Hessey	2	0	0	0	2
=	MF	(Republic of Ireland)	17	Jamie Devitt	2	0	0	0	2
=	MF	(England)	14	Kevin McIntyre	2	0	0	0	2
17	DF	(England)	3	Dean Winnard	1	0	0	0	1
=	MF	(England)	10	Ian Craney	1	0	0	0	1
=	DF	(England)	2	Danny Coid	1	0	0	0	1
=	MF	(England)	8	Charlie Barnett	1	0	0	0	1
				TOTALS	53	1	0	3	57

=== Disciplinary record ===
Number	Nation	Position	Name	League Two		FA Cup		League Cup		FL Trophy		Total	
Number	Nation	Position	Name	Yellow card	Red card	Yellow card	Red card	Yellow card	Red card	Yellow card	Red card	Yellow card	Red card
5	(Wales)	DF	Aristote Nsiala	11	1	0	0	0	0	0	0	11	1
14	(England)	MF	Kevin McIntyre	6	1	1	0	0	0	0	0	7	1
12	(England)	DF	Peter Murphy	7	1	0	0	0	0	0	0	7	1
4	(England)	DF	Sean Hessey	5	1	0	0	0	0	1	0	6	1
6	(England)	MF	Andrew Procter	5	0	0	1	0	0	0	0	5	1
11	(England)	MF	Luke Joyce	5	1	0	0	0	0	0	0	5	1
7	(England)	FW	Craig Lindfield	5	0	0	0	0	0	0	0	5	0
3	(England)	DF	Dean Winnard	3	0	0	0	1	0	0	0	4	0
2	(England)	DF	Danny Coid	3	0	0	0	0	0	0	0	3	0
17	(Republic of Ireland)	MF	Jamie Devitt	3	0	0	0	0	0	0	0	3	0
8	(England)	MF	Charlie Barnett	2	1	0	0	0	0	0	0	2	1
29	(Republic of Ireland)	DF	Michael Liddle	2	1	0	0	0	0	0	0	2	1
30	(England)	DF	Will Hatfield	2	0	0	0	0	0	0	0	2	0
16	(England)	MF	Bobby Grant	2	0	0	0	0	0	0	0	2	0
17	(Republic of Ireland)	DF	Kevin Long	1	1	0	0	0	0	0	0	1	1
21	(England)	FW	Wes Fletcher	1	0	0	0	0	0	0	0	1	0
19	(England)	FW	James Spray	1	0	0	0	0	0	0	0	1	0
23	(Republic of Ireland)	FW	Padraig Amond	1	0	0	0	0	0	0	0	1	0
27	(England)	MF	Bryan Hughes	1	0	0	0	0	0	0	0	1	0
10	(England)	MF	Ian Craney	1	0	0	0	0	0	0	0	1	0
25	(England)	GK	Ian Dunbavin	1	0	0	0	0	0	0	0	1	0
9	(England)	FW	Kurtis Guthrie	1	0	0	0	0	0	0	0	1	0
			TOTALS	69	8	1	1	1	0	1	0	72	9

== Results ==
=== Pre-season friendlies ===
16 July 2011	Accrington Stanley	1–2	Blackburn Rovers	Crown Ground
12:15	Guthrie 54'		Andrews 15'; Kalinić 66'

23 July 2011	Barrow	0–1	Accrington Stanley	Holker Street
15:00			Coid 54'	Attendance: 403

26 July 2011	Marine	0–0	Accrington Stanley	The Arriva Stadium
19:30

30 July 2011	Stockport County	1–0	Accrington Stanley	Edgeley Park
15:00	McConville 33' (pen.)

=== League Two ===
6 August 2011 1	Northampton Town	0–0	Accrington Stanley	Sixfields Stadium
15:00				Attendance: 4,621

13 August 2011 2	Accrington Stanley	1–2	Southend United	Crown Ground
15:00	Procter 40'		Dickinson 2' (pen.); Hall 67'	Attendance: 1,491

16 August 2011 3	Accrington Stanley	1–0	Bradford City	Crown Ground
19:45	Fletcher 77'			Attendance: 2,652

20 August 2011 4	Port Vale	4–1	Accrington Stanley	Vale Park
15:00	Rigg 19', 43'; Roberts 23'; Pope 37'		Murphy 81'	Attendance: 4,615

27 August 2011 5	Accrington Stanley	2–1	Burton Albion	Crown Ground
15:00	Winnard 72'; Fletcher 81'		Richards 39'	Attendance: 1,362

3 September 2011 6	Barnet	0–0	Accrington Stanley	Underhill Stadium
15:00				Attendance: 2,380

10 September 2011 7	Gillingham	1–1	Accrington Stanley	MEMS Priestfield Stadium
15:00	Rooney 88' (pen.)		Craney 84'	Attendance: 4,619

13 September 2011 8	Accrington Stanley	1–1	Rotherham United	Crown Ground
19:45	Hessey 83'		Cresswell 38'	Attendance: 1,486

17 September 2011 9	Accrington Stanley	0–2	Crewe Alexandra	Crown Ground
15:00			Leitch-Smith 11'; Moore 14'	Attendance: 1,503

24 September 2011 10	Oxford United	1–1	Accrington Stanley	Kassam Stadium
15:00	McLaren 35'		Murphy 62'	Attendance: 6,472

1 October 2011 11	Accrington Stanley	3–2	Aldershot Town	Crown Ground
15:00	Hessey 10'; Coid 56'; Barnett 88'		Hylton 7', 24'	Attendance: 1,438

8 October 2011 12	Plymouth Argyle	2–2	Accrington Stanley	Home Park
15:00	Walton 27' (pen.); Soukouna 45'		Long 55'; Amond 66'	Attendance: 8,013

15 October 2011 13	Accrington Stanley	0–2	Swindon Town	Crown Ground
15:00			Jervis 38'; Montano 58'	Attendance: 1,663

21 October 2011 14	Accrington Stanley	0–1	Cheltenham Town	Crown Ground
19:45			Goulding 44'	Attendance: 1,641

25 October 2011 15	Shrewsbury Town	0–1	Accrington Stanley	New Meadow
19:45			Bradshaw 28'	Attendance: 5,076

29 October 2011 16	Crawley Town	1–1	Accrington Stanley	Broadfield Stadium
15:00	Akpan 80'		Murphy 40'	Attendance: 2,967

5 November 2011 17	Accrington Stanley	2–1	Bristol Rovers	Crown Ground
15:00	Evans 5'; Long 30'		Anyinsah 47'	Attendance: 1,643

19 November 2011 18	Macclesfield Town	1–1	Accrington Stanley	Moss Rose
15:00	Brisley 19'		Stockley 79'	Attendance: 1,792

26 November 2011 19	Accrington Stanley	3–0	Dagenham & Redbridge	Crown Ground
15:00	Lindfield 57'; Amond 83', 84'			Attendance: 1,308

10 December 2011 20	AFC Wimbledon	0–2	Accrington Stanley	Kingsmeadow
15:00			Amond 3'; Lindfield 24'	Attendance: 4,053

17 December 2011 21	Accrington Stanley	3–1	Torquay United	Crown Ground
15:00	Hughes 13'; Stockley 62'; Long 89'		McPhee 90+1'	Attendance: 1,404

26 December 2011 22	Morecambe	1–2	Accrington Stanley	Globe Arena
15:00	Drummond 55'		Stockley 34'; Hughes 75'	Attendance: 2,569

30 December 2011 23	Hereford United	1–1	Accrington Stanley	Edgar Street
20:00	Arquin 5'		Evans 72'	Attendance: 2,057

2 January 2012 24	Accrington Stanley	4–0	Macclesfield Town	Crown Ground
15:00	Lindfield 13'; Long 45+1'; Evans 62'; Procter 76'			Attendance: 1,704

6 January 2012 25	Burton Albion	0–2	Accrington Stanley	Perelli Stadium
19:45			McIntyre 31'; Austin 65' (o.g.)	Attendance: 2,486

14 January 2012 26	Accrington Stanley	0–3	Barnet	Crown Ground
15:00			Holmes 23'; Hughes 45+1'; Deering 54'	Attendance: 1,652

21 January 2012 27	Aldershot Town	0–0	Accrington Stanley	Recreation Ground
15:00				Attendance: 2,581

28 January 2012 28	Accrington Stanley	4–3	Gillingham	Crown Ground
15:00	Michael Smith 1', 19', 45+1'; Luke Joyce 31'		Danny Jackman 7'; Gavin Tomlin 70', 85'	Attendance: 1,734

4 February 2012 29	Crewe Alexandra	P–P	Accrington Stanley	Alexandra Stadium
15:00

11 February 2012 30	Accrington Stanley	P–P	Oxford United	Crown Ground
15:00

14 February 2012 31	Rotherham United	1–0	Accrington Stanley	Recreation Ground
19:45	Harrad 28' (pen.)			Attendance: 2,572

18 February 2012 32	Accrington Stanley	0–4	Plymouth Argyle	Crown Ground
15:00			MacDonald 3', 24'; Purse 72'; Daley 90'	Attendance: 2,186

21 February 2012 29	Crewe Alexandra	2–0	Accrington Stanley	Alexandra Stadium
19:45	Clayton 81'; Murphy 90+2'			Attendance: 3,179

25 February 2012 33	Swindon Town	2–0	Accrington Stanley	County Ground
15:00	Benson 8', 29'			Attendance: 7,962

3 March 2012 34	Accrington Stanley	2–2	Port Vale	Crown Ground
15:00	Amond 45'; Hatfield 88'		McCombe 27'; Shuker 56'	Attendance: 2,093

6 March 2012 35	Bradford City	1–1	Accrington Stanley	Valley Parade
19:45	Wells 50'		Hatfield 90+1'	Attendance: 9,379

10 March 2012 36	Southend United	2–2	Accrington Stanley	Roots Hall
15:00	Prosser 65'; Benyon 74'		Devitt 41'; Amond 90+1'	Attendance: 5,964

17 March 2012 37	Accrington Stanley	2–1	Northampton Town	Crown Ground
15:00	Devitt 42'; Lindfield 87'		Williams 69'	Attendance: 1,803

20 March 2012 38	Accrington Stanley	1–1	Morecambe	Crown Ground
19:45	Murphy 14'		Carlton 70'	Attendance: 1,924

24 March 2012 39	Dagenham & Redbridge	2–1	Accrington Stanley	Victoria Road
15:00	Woodall 85'; Doe 90+2'		Nsiala (yellow card) 37' (yellow-red card) 90+1'; Grant 43'	Attendance: 1,476

27 March 2012 30	Accrington Stanley	0–2	Oxford United	Crown Ground
19:45			Hall 42', 73'	Attendance: 1,408

31 March 2012 40	Accrington Stanley	2–1	AFC Wimbledon	Crown Ground
15:00	Joyce 4'; Hatfield 80'		Moore 30'	Attendance: 1,627

6 April 2012 41	Torquay United	1–0	Accrington Stanley	Plainmoor
15:00	Howe 73'			Attendance: 3,934

9 April 2012 42	Accrington Stanley	2–1	Hereford United	Crown Ground
15:00	Grant 47'; Amond 85'		Evans 57'	Attendance: 1,749

14 April 2012 43	Cheltenham Town	4–1	Accrington Stanley	Abbey Business Stadium
15:00	Lowe 12'; Burgess 56'; Pack 62'; Kaid Mohamed 90+2'		Grant 76'	Attendance: 3,217

21 April 2012 44	Accrington Stanley	1–1	Shrewsbury Town	Crown Ground
15:00	Hughes 78'		Gornell 31'	Attendance: 3,275

28 April 2012 45	Bristol Rovers	5–1	Accrington Stanley	Memorial Stadium
15:00	Harrold 11', 22' (pen.); Dorman 29'; Lund 58', 78'		McIntyre 38'	Attendance: 7,073

5 May 2012 46	Accrington Stanley	0–1	Crawley Town	Crown Ground
15:00	Nsiala (yellow card) 83'		Neilson 67'	Attendance: 2,299

=== FA Cup ===
12 November 2011 Round 1	Notts County	4–1	Accrington Stanley	Meadow Lane
15:00	Hawley 34', 89'; Judge 47'; Sheehan 80'		Joyce 85'	Attendance: 3,613

=== League Cup ===
9 August 2011 Round 1	Accrington Stanley	0–2	Scunthorpe United	Crown Ground
19:45			Dagnall 82' (pen.); Barcham 90+3'	Attendance: 1,356

=== Football League Trophy ===
6 September 2011 Round 1 (N)	Accrington Stanley	3–2	Carlisle United	Crown Ground
19:45	Lindfield 35'; Amond 86'; Procter 90'		McGovern 61'; Zoko 68'	Attendance: 1,069

4 October 2011 Round 2 (N)	Accrington Stanley	A – A	Tranmere Rovers	Crown Ground
19:45

12 October 2011 Round 2 (N)	Accrington Stanley	0–1	Tranmere Rovers	Crown Ground
19:45			Taylor 39'	Attendance: 1,509

== Transfers ==
Players transferred in
Date	Pos.	Name	Previous club	Fee	Ref.
30 June 2011	DF	(England) Danny Coid	(England) Blackpool	Free	
16 July 2011	MF	(England) Kevin McIntyre	(England) Shrewsbury Town	Free	
19 July 2011	FW	(Jersey) Kurtis Guthrie	(Jersey) Trinity	Free	
28 July 2011	GK	(Scotland) Sean Murdoch	(Scotland) Hamilton Academical	Free	
27 October 2011	MF	(England) Bryan Hughes	(Iceland) ÍBV	Free	
18 January 2012	MF	(England) Liam Willis	(England) Wigan Athletic	Free	
10 February 2012	FW	(England) Will Hatfield	(England) FC Halifax Town	Free	
Players transferred out
Date	Pos.	Name	To	Fee	Ref.
24 June 2011	DF	(England) Jonathan Bateson	(England) Macclesfield Town	Free	
28 June 2011	DF	(Wales) Joe Jacobson	(England) Shrewsbury Town	Free	
28 June 2011	MF	(Republic of Ireland) Jimmy Ryan	(England) Scunthorpe United	Tribunal	
6 July 2011	GK	(Australia) Alex Cisak	(England) Oldham Athletic	Free	
4 August 2011	FW	(England) Terry Gornell	(England) Shrewsbury Town	Undisclosed	
19 January 2012	FW	(England) Nat Taylor	(England) Clitheroe	Free	
23 January 2012	MF	(England) Andrew Procter	(England) Preston North End	Undisclosed	
14 March 2012	GK	(Scotland) Sean Murdoch	Unattached		
Players loaned in
Date from	Pos.	Name	From	Date to	Ref.
28 July 2011	DF	(England) Kern Miller	(England) Barnsley	January 2012	
5 August 2011	DF	(Republic of Ireland) Kevin Long	(England) Burnley	5 January 2012	
15 August 2011	FW	(England) Wes Fletcher	(England) Burnley	25 October 2011	
19 August 2011	FW	(England) Louis Moult	(England) Stoke City	19 September 2011	
26 August 2011	FW	(Republic of Ireland) Pádraig Amond	(Portugal) Paços de Ferreira	End of season	
30 August 2011	DF	(Wales) Thomas Bender	(England) Colchester United	24 February 2012	
3 October 2011	FW	(England) James Spray	(England) Wolverhampton Wanderers	31 October 2011	
14 October 2011	FW	(England) Will Hatfield	(England) Leeds United	31 December 2011	
14 October 2011	FW	(England) Luke Dobie	(England) Middlesbrough	3 January 2012	
31 October 2011	FW	(England) Micah Evans	(England) Blackburn Rovers	End of season	
4 November 2011	FW	(England) Jayden Stockley	(England) Bournemouth	9 January 2012	
5 January 2012	DF	(Wales) Aristote Nsiala	(England) Everton	End of season	
18 January 2012	FW	(England) Michael Smith	(England) Charlton Athletic	12 March 2012	
17 February 2012	MF	(Republic of Ireland) Jamie Devitt	(England) Hull City	End of season	
24 February 2012	GK	(England) Lee Nicholls	(England) Wigan Athletic	End of season	
24 February 2012	MF	(Republic of Ireland) Michael Liddle	(England) Sunderland	End of season	
15 March 2012	MF	(England) Bobby Grant	(England) Scunthorpe United	18 April 2012	
16 March 2012	DF	(Republic of Ireland) Rob Kiernan	(England) Wigan Athletic	End of season	
Players loaned out
Date from	Pos.	Name	To	Date to	Ref.
24 November 2011	FW	(Jersey) Kurtis Guthrie	(England) Southport	5 January 2012	
20 January 2012	MF	(England) Andrew Procter	(England) Preston North End	23 January 2012	
