= 2008–09 Accrington Stanley F.C. season =

Accrington Stanley
2008–09 season
- Manager: John Coleman
- Stadium: Crown Ground
- League Two: 16th
- FA Cup: First round
- Football League Cup: First round
- Johnstones Paint Trophy: First

This page shows the progress of Accrington Stanley F.C. in the 2008–09 football season. During the season, Accrington Stanley competed in League Two in the English league system.

== League table ==
Pos	Team	Pld	W	D	L	GF	GA	GD	Pts
14	Rotherham United	46	21	12	13	60	46	+14	58 (Note: Rotherham United deducted 17 points for leaving administration without a Company Voluntary Agreement.)
15	Aldershot Town	46	14	12	20	59	80	−21	54
16	Accrington Stanley	46	13	11	22	42	59	−17	50
17	Barnet	46	11	15	20	56	74	−18	48
18	Port Vale	46	13	9	24	44	66	−22	48

Source: The Football League
Rules for classification: 1) points; 2) goal difference; 3) number of goals scored.

== Results ==
=== Football League Two ===
9 August 2008 1	Accrington Stanley	0–1	Aldershot Town	Accrington
			Donnelly 43'	Stadium: Crown Ground; Attendance: 1,805

16 August 2008 2	Port Vale	0–2	Accrington Stanley	Stoke on Trent
			Craney 3'; Mullin 89'	Stadium: Vale Park; Attendance: 6,643

23 August 2008 3	Accrington Stanley	2–0	Macclesfield Town	Accrington
	Mullin 50'; Ryan 60'			Stadium: Crown Ground; Attendance: 1,323

30 August 2008 4	Gillingham	1–0	Accrington Stanley	Gillingham
	Oli 75'			Stadium: Priestfield; Attendance: 4,733

6 September 2008 5	Exeter City	2–1	Accrington Stanley	Exeter
	Gill 45'; Watson 68'		Clarke 11'	Stadium: St James Park; Attendance: 3,930

13 September 2008 6	Accrington Stanley	1–1	Notts County	Accrington
	Clarke 90+2'		Canham 90+1'	Stadium: Crown Ground; Attendance: 1,404

20 September 2008 7	Darlington	3–0	Accrington Stanley	Darlington
	Clarke 32', 57'; White 76'			Stadium: The Darlington Arena; Attendance: 2,814

28 September 2008 8	Accrington Stanley	1–3	Rochdale	Accrington
	Miles 2'		Le Fondre 38' (pen.); Buckley 57'; Rhodes 90'	Stadium: Crown Ground; Attendance: 2,417

4 October 2008 9	Barnet	2–1	Accrington Stanley	London
	O'Flynn 1'; Yakubu 75'		Murdock 45'; Williams (red card) 73'	Stadium: Underhill; Attendance: 1,899

11 October 2008 10	Accrington Stanley	2–3	Bradford City	Accrington
	Ryan 23'; Gornell 50'		Boulding 80'; Conlon 88'; Thorne 89'	Stadium: Crown Ground; Attendance: 3,012

18 October 2008 11	Luton Town	1–2	Accrington Stanley	Luton
	Hall 34'		Mullin 16'; Gornell 54'	Stadium: Kenilworth Road; Attendance: 5,492

21 October 2008 12	Accrington Stanley	2–1	Shrewsbury Town	Accrington
	Gornell 2'; Mullin 6'		Davies 68'	Stadium: Crown Ground; Attendance: 1,249

25 October 2008 13	Accrington Stanley	0–1	Wycombe Wanderers	Accrington
			Zebroski 90'	Stadium: Crown Ground; Attendance: 1,217

28 October 2008 14	Morecambe	1–1	Accrington Stanley	Morecambe
	Stanley 50'		McStay 5' (o.g.)	Stadium: Christie Park; Attendance: 2,044

1 November 2008 15	Dagenham & Redbridge	0–0	Accrington Stanley	London
				Stadium: Victoria Road; Attendance: 1,433

15 November 2008 16	Accrington Stanley	3–0	Bournemouth	Accrington
	Mullin 3'; Gornell 13'; Griffiths 20'			Stadium: Crown Ground; Attendance: 1,152

22 November 2008 17	Chesterfield	1–1	Accrington Stanley	Chesterfield
	Lester 14'		Ryan 85'	Stadium: Saltergate; Attendance: 3,215

29 November 2008 18	Accrington Stanley	1–2	Bury	Accrington
	Clarke 79' (pen.)		Jones 35'; Barry-Murphy 38'	Stadium: Crown Ground; Attendance: 2,093

12 December 2008 19	Lincoln City	5–1	Accrington Stanley	Lincoln
	Pătulea 68', 90'; Brown 77'; Wright 83'; Frecklington 90' (pen.)		Miles 11'	Stadium: Sincil Bank; Attendance: 2,625

20 December 2008 20	Accrington Stanley	1–3	Rotherham United	Accrington
	Procter 33'		Burchill 6' (pen.), 11'; Broughton 88'	Stadium: Crown Ground; Attendance: 1,172

26 December 2008 21	Chester City	2–0	Accrington Stanley	Chester
	Lowe 34', 60' (pen.)		Miles 11'	Stadium: Deva Stadium; Attendance: 2,223

28 December 2008 22	Accrington Stanley	3–1	Grimsby Town	Accrington
	Clarke 11', 59', 84'		Proudlock 14'	Stadium: Crown Ground; Attendance: 1,200

3 January 2009 23	Rochdale	3–1	Accrington Stanley	Rochdale
	Le Fondre 22' (pen.); Buckley 56'; Higginbotham 87'		Cavanagh 24'	Stadium: Spotland; Attendance: 3,126

17 January 2009 24	Bradford City	1–1	Accrington Stanley	Bradford
	Conlon 51'		Ryan 5'	Stadium: Coral Windows Stadium; Attendance: 12,172

24 January 2009 25	Accrington Stanley	1–1	Barnet	Accrington
	Mullin 56'		Furlong 4'; Gillet (red card) 14'	Stadium: Crown Ground; Attendance: 1,056

27 January 2009 26	Accrington Stanley	1–0	Morecambe	Accrington
	Ryan 57'			Stadium: Crown Ground; Attendance: 1,407

31 January 2009 27	Wycombe Wanderers	2–1	Accrington Stanley	High Wycombe
	Murdock 24' (o.g.); Harrold 80'		Mullin 16'	Stadium: Adams Park; Attendance: 6,166

3 February 2009 28	Shrewsbury Town	2–0	Accrington Stanley	Shrewsbury
	Coughlan 20'; Holt 40' (pen.)			Stadium: Prostar Stadium; Attendance: 4,134

10 February 2009 29	Accrington Stanley	1–1	Brentford	Accrington
	Ryan 48'		Rhodes 90'	Stadium: Crown Ground; Attendance: 1,111

14 February 2009 30	Bournemouth	1–0	Accrington Stanley	Bournemouth
	Pitman 86'			Stadium: Fitness First Stadium; Attendance: 4,109

21 February 2009 31	Accrington Stanley	0–0	Dagenham & Redbridge	Accrington
				Stadium: Crown Ground; Attendance: 1,123

24 February 2009 32	Accrington Stanley	0–0	Luton Town	Accrington
				Stadium: Crown Ground; Attendance: 1,033

28 February 2009 33	Aldershot Town	3–1	Accrington Stanley	Aldershot
	Hudson 23'; Robinson 41', 45'		Lindfield 62'	Stadium: EBB Stadium; Attendance: 2,604

7 March 2009 34	Accrington Stanley	0–2	Gillingham	Accrington
			Jackson 18'; Oli 67'	Stadium: Crown Ground; Attendance: 1,308

10 March 2009 35	Macclesfield Town	0–2	Accrington Stanley	Macclesfield
			Williams 42'; Procter 89'	Stadium: Moss Rose; Attendance: 1,746

14 March 2009 36	Notts County	1–1	Accrington Stanley	Nottingham
	Facey 73'		Ryan 17'	Stadium: Meadow Lane; Attendance: 3,701

17 March 2009 37	Accrington Stanley	2–0	Port Vale	Accrington
	Procter 4'; Ryan 27'			Stadium: Crown Ground; Attendance: 1,144

21 March 2009 38	Accrington Stanley	2–1	Exeter City	Accrington
	Miles 34'; Lindfield 64'		Stansfield 5'	Stadium: Crown Ground; Attendance: 1,169

24 March 2009 39	Accrington Stanley	1–0	Darlington	Accrington
	Ryan 22'			Stadium: Crown Ground; Attendance: 1,086

28 March 2009 40	Rotherham United	0–0	Accrington Stanley	Sheffield
				Stadium: Don Valley Stadium; Attendance: 2,804

4 April 2009 41	Accrington Stanley	0–2	Lincoln City	Accrington
			Kerr 4', 50'	Stadium: Crown Ground; Attendance: 1,139

11 April 2009 42	Grimsby Town	0–1	Accrington Stanley	Grimsby
			Symes 71'	Stadium: Blundell Park; Attendance: 6,453

13 April 2009 43	Accrington Stanley	0–1	Chester City	Accrington
			Lowe 41' (pen.)	Stadium: Crown Ground; Attendance: 1,100

18 April 2009 44	Brentford	3–0	Accrington Stanley	London
	Williams 8'; Dickson 41'; Clarke 54' (pen.)			Stadium: Griffin Park; Attendance: 7,135

25 April 2009 45	Accrington Stanley	1–0	Chesterfield	Accrington
	Grant 50'		Lester (red card) 79'	Stadium: Crown Ground; Attendance: 1,795

2 May 2009 46	Bury	1–0	Accrington Stanley	Bury
	Jevons 90' (pen.)		Procter (red card) 90'	Stadium: Gigg Lane; Attendance: 7,515

=== FA Cup ===
8 November 2008 Round 1	Accrington Stanley	0–0	Tranmere Rovers	Accrington
				Stadium: Crown Ground; Attendance: 2,126

13 November 2008 Round 1 replay	Tranmere Rovers	1–0	Accrington Stanley	Birkenhead
	Shuker 69'			Stadium: Prenton Park; Attendance: 2,560

=== League Cup ===
12 August 2008 Round 1	Wolverhampton Wanderers	3–2 (a.e.t.)	Accrington Stanley	Wolverhampton
	Iwelumo 73', 102'; Davies 106'		Mullin 40'; Craney 104'; Williams (red card) 120'	Stadium: Molineux; Attendance: 9,424

=== Football League Trophy ===
2 September 2008 Northern Section Round 1	Tranmere Rovers	1–0	Accrington Stanley	Birkenhead
	Sonko 49'			Stadium: Prenton Park; Attendance: 2,410

== Players ==
=== First-team squad ===
Includes all players who were awarded squad numbers during the season.

Note: Flags indicate national team as defined under FIFA eligibility rules; some limited exceptions apply. Players may hold more than one non-FIFA nationality.

No.	Pos.	Nation	Player
1	GK	SCO	Kenny Arthur
2	DF	ENG	Peter Cavanagh
3	DF	ENG	Chris King
4	DF	ENG	Leam Richardson
5	DF	NIR	Colin Murdock
6	MF	ENG	Andrew Procter
7	FW	ENG	John Miles
8	FW	ENG	Bevan Burey
9	FW	ENG	Craig Lindfield (on loan from Liverpool)
10	FW	ENG	Paul Mullin
11	MF	ENG	Bobby Grant
12	DF	ENG	Phil Edwards
14	MF	IRL	Jimmy Ryan
15	DF	ENG	Robbie Williams

No.	Pos.	Nation	Player
16	MF	ENG	John Mullin
17	GK	ENG	Ian Dunbavin
18	DF	ENG	Peter Murphy
19	DF	ENG	James Bell
20	FW	ENG	Andrew Smith
21	FW	ENG	Chris Turner
22	MF	ENG	Sean McConville
24	GK	NZL	Zac Hibbert
25	MF	ENG	Alan Burton
29	DF	ENG	Kieran Charnock (on loan from Peterborough United)
31	MF	ENG	Adam Strode
32	FW	ENG	Adam Black
33	MF	ENG	Adam Kay (on loan from Bristol Rovers)
34	FW	ENG	Michael Symes (on loan from Shrewsbury Town)

=== Left club during season ===
Note: Flags indicate national team as defined under FIFA eligibility rules; some limited exceptions apply. Players may hold more than one non-FIFA nationality.

No.	Pos.	Nation	Player
8	MF	ENG	Ian Craney (joined Huddersfield Town on 18 August 2008)
22	FW	NGA	Fola Onibuje
23	MF	ENG	David Worrall (returned to parent club West Bromwich Albion following loan spell)
27	FW	ENG	Terry Gornell (returned to parent club Tranmere Rovers following loan spell)
9	FW	ENG	Jamie Clarke (returned to parent club Blackburn Rovers following loan spell)
23	FW	IRL	Craig Mahon (returned to parent club Wigan Athletic following loan spell)

No.	Pos.	Nation	Player
26	MF	AUS	Rostyn Griffiths (returned to parent club Blackburn Rovers following loan spell)
28	FW	ENG	Gregg Blundell (returned to parent club Darlington following loan spell)
23	MF	ENG	John Paul Kissock (returned to parent club Everton following loan spell)
30	FW	ENG	Kallum Higginbotham (returned to parent club Rochdale following loan spell)
24	GK	ENG	Jamie Speare
