= 2010–11 Lincoln City F.C. season =

Lincoln City F.C.
2010–11 season
- Chairman: Bob Dorrian
- Manager: Chris Sutton (resigned 29 September); Scott Lindsey (caretaker until 18 October); Steve Tilson
- Stadium: Sincil Bank
- Football League Two: 23rd (relegated)
- FA Cup: Second round (eliminated by Hereford United)
- League Cup: First round (eliminated by Leeds United)
- Football League Trophy: Northern Section; First round (eliminated by Rotherham United)
- Top goalscorer: League: Ashley Grimes (15); All: Ashley Grimes (17)
- Highest home attendance: 7,932 vs. Aldershot Town, 7 May 2011
- Lowest home attendance: 1,794 vs. Hereford United, 8 January 2011
- Average home league attendance: 3,508
Home colours	Away colours	Third colours

This page shows the progress of Lincoln City F.C. in the 2010–11 football season. This year they played their games in League Two in the English league system.

== Results ==
=== League Two ===
Date	Opponent	Venue	Result	Score F–A	Goalscorers	Attendance
7 Aug	Rotherham United	A	L	1–2	Carayol 52'	3,772
14 Aug	Torquay United	H	L	0–2		3,033
21 Aug	Gillingham	A	W	1–0	Hughton 9'	4,838
28 Aug	Crewe Alexandra	H	D	1–1	Jarrett 40'	3,024
4 Sep	Chesterfield	A	L	1–2	Hutchinson 88'	6,429
11 Sep	Barnet	H	W	1–0	Hutchinson (pen) 16'	2,884
17 Sep	Accrington Stanley	A	L	0–3		1,844
25 Sep	Stevenage	H	L	0–1		3,215
28 Sep	Burton Albion	H	D	0–0		2,520
2 Oct	Southend United	A	L	0–1		5,154
9 Oct	Macclesfield Town	H	W	2–1	Swaibu 38', Clapham 68'	3,047
16 Oct	Shrewsbury Town	A	L	0–2		5,453
23 Oct	Stockport County	H	D	0–0		4,809
30 Oct	Wycombe Wanderers	A	D	2–2	Carayol 21', Hutchinson 69'	4,325
2 Nov	Northampton Town	H	L	0–2		4,459
13 Nov	Morecambe	A	W	2–1	Swaibu 52', Grimes 57'	2,085
20 Nov	Hereford United	H	W	3–1	Hutchinson 27', Facey 34', Carayol 57'	3,888
23 Nov	Bury	H	L	0–5		3,659
1 Jan	Bradford City	H	L	1–2	Grimes (pen) 25'	3,225
3 Jan	Northampton Town	A	L	1–2	O'Keefe 75'	4,112
15 Jan	Wycombe Wanderers	H	L	1–2	McCallum 17'	2,890
22 Jan	Stockport County	A	W	4–3	Grimes 5', 60', 65', Watts 45'	4,348
25 Jan	Cheltenham Town	A	W	2–1	Hunt 9', O'Keefe 22'	2,292
29 Jan	Port Vale	H	W	1–0	Grimes 86'	3,370
1 Feb	Bradford City	A	W	2–1	Facey 42', McCallum 79'	10,543
5 Feb	Hereford United	A	W	1–0	Facey 29'	2,776
8 Feb	Shrewsbury Town	H	L	1–5	Grimes 7'	3,202
12 Feb	Morecambe	H	W	2–0	Grimes 10', 42'	2,884
15 Feb	Aldershot Town	A	D	2–2	O'Keefe 65', Grimes 86'	1,847
19 Feb	Chesterfield	H	L	0–2		4,172
26 Feb	Barnet	A	L	2–4	Howell 47', Grimes 50'	2,226
1 Mar	Oxford United	H	W	3–1	O'Keefe 5', Worley og 63', Tonkin og 67'	2,261
5 Mar	Accrington Stanley	H	D	0–0		2,868
8 Mar	Burton Albion	A	L	1–3	Grimes 82'	2,051
12 Mar	Southend United	H	W	2–1	Grimes 38', 78'	3,560
15 Mar	Macclesfield Town	A	D	1–1	Hunt 19'	1,067
19 Mar	Stevenage	A	L	1–2	Grimes 33'	2,732
25 Mar	Rotherham United	H	L	0–6		3,766
29 Mar	Port Vale	A	L	1–2	McCallum 3'	4,636
2 Apr	Torquay United	A	L	0–2		2,751
9 Apr	Gillingham	H	L	0–4		3,022
16 Apr	Crewe Alexandra	A	D	1–1	Green 47'	3,731
22 Apr	Bury	A	L	0–1		4,248
25 Apr	Cheltenham Town	H	L	0–2		3,007
30 Apr	Oxford United	A	L	1–2	Hughton 5'	7,485
7 May	Aldershot Town	H	L	0–3		7,932

=== FA Cup ===
Round	Date	Opponent	Venue	Result	Score F–A	Goalscorers	Attendance
First round	6 Nov	Nuneaton Town	H	W	1–0	Jarrett 90'	3,084
Second round	30 Nov	Hereford United	A	D	2–2	Grimes 19', Carayol 27'	1,803
Third round	8 Jan	Hereford United	H	L	3–4	Clapham 6', Facey 24', Grimes 48'	1,794

=== Football League Cup ===
Round	Date	Opponent	Venue	Result	Score F–A	Goalscorers	Attendance
First round	10 Aug	Leeds United	A	L	0–4		12,602

=== Football League Trophy ===
Round	Date	Opponent	Venue	Result	Score F–A	Goalscorers	Attendance
First round	31 Aug	Rotherham United	A	L	0–1		1,677

== League data ==
=== League table ===
Pos	Team	Pld	W	D	L	GF	GA	GD	Pts	Promotion, qualification or relegation
20	Morecambe	46	13	12	21	54	73	−19	51	
21	Hereford United	46	12	17	17	50	66	−16	50 (Note: Torquay United deducted one point and Hereford United deducted three points)	
22	Barnet	46	12	12	22	58	77	−19	48	
23	Lincoln City (R)	46	13	8	25	45	81	−36	47	Relegation to Conference National
24	Stockport County (R)	46	9	14	23	48	96	−48	41	Relegation to Conference National

Updated to match(es) played on 28 May 2011. Source: The Football League
Rules for classification: 1) points; 2) goal difference; 3) number of goals scored.
(R) Relegated

=== Results summary ===
Overall								Home						Away					
Pld	W	D	L	GF	GA	GD	Pts	W	D	L	GF	GA	GD	W	D	L	GF	GA	GD
46	13	8	25	45	81	−36	47	7	4	12	18	41	−23	6	4	13	27	40	−13

Last updated: 11 May 2011.
Source: BBC Sport

=== Results by round ===
Round	1	2	3	4	5	6	7	8	9	10	11	12	13	14	15	16	17	18	19	20	21	22	23	24	25	26	27	28	29	30	31	32	33	34	35	36	37	38	39	40	41	42	43	44	45	46
Ground	A	H	A	H	A	H	A	H	H	A	H	A	H	A	H	A	H	H	H	A	H	A	A	H	A	A	H	H	A	H	A	H	H	A	H	A	A	H	A	A	H	A	A	H	A	H
Result	L	L	W	D	L	W	L	L	D	L	W	L	D	D	L	W	W	L	L	L	L	W	W	W	W	W	L	W	D	L	L	W	D	L	W	D	L	L	L	L	L	D	L	L	L	L
Position			15	15	18	15	15	21	20	22	20	21	21	22	23	21	16	19	22	22	24	24	22	19	19	15	16	13	13	15	16	15	15	16	15	14	16	17	17	18	20	20	20	21	22	23

Updated to match(es) played on 14 June 2011. Source: Results
A = Away; H = Home; W = Win; D = Draw; L = Loss

== Appearances and goals ==
Updated 6 May 2011.
(Substitute appearances in brackets)

No.	Pos.	Name	League		FA Cup		League Cup		League Trophy		Total		Discipline	
No.	Pos.	Name	Apps	Goals	Apps	Goals	Apps	Goals	Apps	Goals	Apps	Goals	Yellow card	Red card
1	GK	(England) Joe Anyon	21	0	3	0	1	0	1	0	26	0	0	0
2	DF	(England) Paul Green	14 (3)	1	1	0	1	0	1	0	17 (3)	1	1	0
3	DF	(England) Joe Anderson	19 (3)	0	1 (1)	0	1	0	1	0	22 (4)	0	2	0
4	DF	(England) Adam Watts	40	1	2	0	1	0	1	0	44	1	4	0
5	DF	(England) Moses Swaibu	12	2	1	0	1	0	1	0	15	2	6	0
6	DF	(England) Danny Hone	25 (1)	0	0	0	0	0	0	0	25 (1)	0	0	0
7	MF	(The Gambia) Mustapha Carayol	24 (9)	3	3	1	1	0	0	0	28 (9)	4	4	0
8	MF	(England) Clark Keltie	16 (2)	0	1	0	0	0	1	0	18 (2)	0	5	1
9	FW	(Canada) Gavin McCallum	24 (12)	3	0	0	1	0	0	0	25 (12)	3	2	0
10	FW	(England) Drewe Broughton	9 (14)	0	0 (1)	0	0	0	0	0	9 (15)	0	2	0
11	MF	(England) Scott Kerr	10 (6)	0	1 (2)	0	1	0	1	0	13 (8)	0	3	1
13	DF	(England) Ian Pearce	3 (1)	0	0	0	0	0	0	0	3 (1)	0	1	0
14	MF	(Republic of Ireland) Josh O'Keefe	33 (4)	4	1	0	1	0	1	0	36 (4)	4	7	0
15	MF	(England) Luke Howell	23 (2)	1	2	0	0	0	0	0	25 (2)	1	2	0
16	DF	(Republic of Ireland) Julian Kelly	21	0	0	0	0	0	0	0	21	0	1	0
17	MF	(Sierra Leone) Albert Jarrett	19 (3)	1	3	1	1	0	0	0	23 (3)	2	3	0
18	FW	(Grenada) Delroy Facey	26 (6)	3	1 (1)	1	0 (1)	0	0 (1)	0	27 (9)	4	0	0
19	DF	(England) Jamie Clapham	21 (4)	1	2	1	0 (1)	0	0	0	23 (5)	2	3	0
20	GK	(England) Paul Musselwhite	0 (1)	0	0	0	0	0	0	0	0 (1)	0	0	0
21	MF	(England) Sam Turner	0 (2)	0	0	0	0	0	0	0	0 (2)	0	0	0
22	FW	(England) Andy Hutchinson	0 (5)	0	0	0	0 (1)	0	1	0	1 (6)	0	0	0
23	DF	(England) Stephen Hunt	14	2	0	0	0	0	0	0	14	2	1	0
24	FW	(England) Nathan Adams	0	0	0	0	0	0	0 (1)	0	0 (1)	0	0	0
24	GK	(Northern Ireland) Trevor Carson	16	0	0	0	0	0	0	0	16	0	0	0
24	GK	(England) Elliot Parish	9	0	0	0	0	0	0	0	9	0	1	0
25	DF	(Republic of Ireland) Cian Hughton	17 (5)	2	1	0	1	0	1	0	20 (5)	2	1	0
26	DF	(England) Josh Gowling	4	0	2	0	0	0	0	0	6	0	0	0
26	MF	(England) Tom Kilbey	6 (1)	0	0	0	0	0	0	0	6 (1)	0	2	0
27	FW	(England) Ben Hutchinson	26 (10)	4	2 (1)	0	0	0	1	0	29 (11)	4	5	1
28	DF	(England) Gavin Hoyte	11 (1)	0	3	0	0	0	0	0	14 (1)	0	1	0
29	FW	(England) Ashley Grimes	24 (3)	15	3	2	0	0	0	0	27 (3)	17	10	0
31	MF	(Ghana) Ali Fuseini	15 (3)	0	0	0	0	0	0	0	15 (3)	0	2	0
39	FW	(England) Scott Spencer	2 (8)	0	0	0	0	0	0	0	2 (8)	0	0	0
40	DF	(Democratic Republic of the Congo) Pat Kanyuka	2 (4)	0	0	0	0	0	0	0	2 (4)	0	1	1

== Awards ==
End of Season Awards	Winner
Vic Withers Memorial Trophy Player of the Season	Ashley Grimes
Bill Stacey Memorial Trophy Away Player of the Season	Danny Hone
Harry Wilmot Trophy Young Player of the Season	Julian Kelly

== Transfers ==
Players transferred in
Date	Pos.	Name	From	Fee	Ref.
17 May 2010	MF	(Republic of Ireland) Josh O'Keefe	(England) Walsall	Free	
20 May 2010	MF	(The Gambia) Mustapha Carayol	(England) Torquay United	£35,000	
20 May 2010	GK	(England) Joe Anyon	(England) Port Vale	Free	
2 June 2010	FW	(England) Drewe Broughton	(England) Rotherham United	Free	
21 June 2010	FW	(Canada) Gavin McCallum	(England) Hereford United	£6,000	
29 June 2010	MF	(Sierra Leone) Albert Jarrett	(England) Barnet	Free (Bosman)	
15 July 2010	FW	(Grenada) Delroy Facey	(England) Notts County	Free	
19 July 2010	DF	(England) Jamie Clapham	(England) Notts County	Free	
31 August 2010	MF	(Mayotte) Adifane Noussoura	Didier Agathe Academy	Free	
27 January 2011	DF	(Democratic Republic of the Congo) Pat Kanyuka	(Romania) Cluj	Free	
28 January 2011	MF	(England) Luke Howell	(England) Milton Keynes Dons	Free	
31 January 2011	FW	(England) Scott Spencer	(England) Southend United	Free	
31 January 2011	MF	(Ghana) Ali Fuseini	(England) Lewes	Free	
Players loaned in
Date from	Pos.	Name	From	Date to	Ref.
18 August 2010	FW	(England) Ben Hutchinson	(Scotland) Celtic	End of season	
28 October 2010	MF	(England) Luke Howell	(England) Milton Keynes Dons	28 January 2011	
28 October 2010	DF	(England) Josh Gowling	(England) Gillingham	28 November 2010	
29 October 2010	DF	(England) Gavin Hoyte	(England) Arsenal	End of season	
29 October 2010	FW	(England) Ashley Grimes	(England) Millwall	End of season	
13 January 2011	DF	(Republic of Ireland) Julian Kelly	(England) Reading	16 April 2011	
20 January 2011	DF	(England) Stephen Hunt	(England) Notts County	23 April 2011	
20 January 2011	GK	(Northern Ireland) Trevor Carson	(England) Sunderland	23 March 2011	
24 March 2011	MF	(England) Tom Kilbey	(England) Portsmouth	End of season	
24 March 2011	GK	(England) Elliott Parish	(England) Aston Villa	End of season	
Players loaned out
Date from	Pos.	Name	To	Date to	Ref.
15 July 2010	DF	(England) Danny Hone	(England) Darlington	1 January 2011	
5 November 2010	DF	(England) Nathan Adams	(England) Stamford	4 December 2010	
6 January 2011	FW	(England) Andy Hutchinson	(England) Harrogate Town	6 February 2011	
18 February 2011	MF	(Sierra Leone) Albert Jarrett	(England) Aldershot Town	18 March 2011	
18 February 2011	FW	(England) Drewe Broughton	(England) AFC Wimbledon	1 April 2011	
8 March 2011	GK	(England) Joe Anyon	(England) Morecambe	8 April 2011	
1 April 2011	FW	(England) Andy Hutchinson	(England) Lewes	End of season	
Players released
Date	Pos.	Name	Subsequent club	Join date	Ref.
9 May 2010	MF	(England) James Reid	(England) Hinckley United	9 August 2010	
13 May 2010	MF	(England) Richard Butcher	(England) Macclesfield Town	20 May 2010	
20 May 2010	FW	(England) Lenell John-Lewis	(England) Bury	5 August 2010	
8 June 2010	GK	(England) Rob Burch	(England) Notts County	1 July 2010 (Bosman)	
1 July 2010	MF	(England) Luca Coleman-Carr	(England) Arundel	21 July 2010	
1 July 2010	MF	(England) Sam Clucas	(Spain) Jerez Industrial	9 September 2010	
1 July 2010	MF	(Scotland) Brian Gilmour	(Scotland) Stenhousemuir	21 March 2011	
31 August 2010	MF	(England) Shane Clarke	(England) Gateshead	6 October 2010	
31 August 2010	FW	(Republic of Ireland) Chris Fagan	(Republic of Ireland) Bohemians	15 February 2011	
29 September 2010	DF	(England) Ian Pearce	(England) Kingstonian	19 March 2011	
15 December 2010	FW	(England) Nathan Adams	(England) Lincoln Moorlands Railway	14 February 2011	
21 December 2010	MF	(Réunion) Adifane Noussoura	Unattached		
4 January 2011	DF	(England) Kern Miller	(England) Barnsley	4 January 2011	
31 January 2011	MF	(England) Scott Kerr	(England) York City	31 January 2011	
28 March 2011	MF	(Sierra Leone) Albert Jarrett	Unattached		
