= Nathan Taylor =

Nathan Taylor may refer to:

- Nathan Taylor (footballer) (born 1990), English footballer
- Nathan C. D. Taylor (1810–1887), American politician
- Nat Taylor (1906–2004), Canadian inventor
- Nate Taylor (born 1976), American filmmaker
- Nathan Taylor, a.k.a. Paris, fictional character
- Nat Taylor (footballer) (born 1992), British footballer
- Nat Taylor (American football) (1927–2006), American football player
- Nathan Taylor (sprinter) (born 1983), Canadian track and field athlete

== See also ==
- Nathaniel Taylor (disambiguation)
