= Josh O'Keefe =

English footballer

Personal information
- Full name: Joshua Adam O'Keefe
- Date of birth: 22 December 1988 (age 37)
- Place of birth: Whalley, England
- Position: Midfielder

Youth career
- 2001–2007: Blackburn Rovers

Senior career*
Years	Team	Apps	(Gls)
2007–2009	Blackburn Rovers	0	(0)
2009–2010	Walsall	13	(0)
2010–2012	Lincoln City	47	(5)
2012	Southport	7	(0)
2012–2014	Hereford United	51	(15)
2014–2015	Kidderminster Harriers	20	(0)
2014	→ Telford United (loan)	5	(0)
2014	→ Chester (loan)	3	(0)
2015–2016	Altrincham	27	(1)
2016–2020	Chorley	134	(17)

International career
2008	Republic of Ireland U21	1	(0)
- * Club domestic league appearances and goals as of 13:26, 13 December 2023 (UTC)

Joshua Adam O'Keefe (born 22 December 1988) is a former footballer who played as a midfielder, he retired in 2020 after spending four years at Chorley.

== Career ==
=== Blackburn Rovers ===
Born in Whalley, Lancashire, O'Keefe was educated at Queen Elizabeth's Grammar School, Blackburn, where along with Frank Fielding he played in their victorious Boodles ISFA Cup team of 2003–04, defeating Millfield School 5–4 on penalties following a 2–2 draw in the final at the Walkers Stadium, whilst also playing representative football for ISFA. He then joined the Blackburn Rovers academy, making his Premier Academy League debut for the club in the 0–0 draw at Newcastle United on 2 April 2005.

=== Walsall ===
He then signed for Walsall on a free transfer and made his debut on 12 September 2009, coming on as a substitute for Richard Taundry, in the Football League One clash with Tranmere Rovers at Prenton Park, which ended in a 3–2 win to Walsall. He was released by Walsall on 10 May 2010 along with six other players.

=== Lincoln City ===
O'Keefe was then signed by Lincoln City on 17 May 2010 on a two-year contract. On 3 January 2011, he scored his first ever goal as a professional, scoring an equaliser in the match against Northampton Town. On 26 December 2011 O'Keefe left Lincoln City by mutual consent.

=== Non-league career ===
On 1 March 2012, O'Keefe joined Conference Premier team Southport. On 24 September he joined Hereford United. On 11 June 2013 he signed a new one-year contract to remain with the club for the 2013–14 season. On 31 January 2014, he signed an 18-month deal with play off hopefuls Kidderminster Harriers. On 1 September 2014, he moved to Telford United on a month-long loan deal where he made five appearances. On 11 November 2014, he was sent on a two-month loan to Chester having only made one appearance all season for the Harriers. His loan spell, due to end on 1 January 2015, was cut short due to injury. On 12 May 2015, he signed for Altrincham, after being released by Kidderminster having made 20 appearances. In June 2016, he agreed a deal to join Chorley.

== International career ==
On 8 August 2008, he was called up for the Republic of Ireland U21 squad, qualifying by virtue of his father's Irish parents. He made his debut as a second-half substitute in the 1–1 draw with the Austria U21 side on 19 August 2008.

== Career statistics ==
As of match played 16 December 2017

Appearances and goals by club, season and competition
Club	Season	League			National Cup		League Cup		Other		Total	
Club	Season	Division	Apps	Goals	Apps	Goals	Apps	Goals	Apps	Goals	Apps	Goals
Walsall	2009–10	League One	13	0	0	0	0	0	0	0	13	0
Lincoln City	2010–11	League Two	37	4	1	0	1	0	1 (Note: Appearance in the Football League Trophy)	0	40	4
Lincoln City	2011–12	Conference Premier	10	1	2	0	—		0	0	12	1
Lincoln City	Lincoln total		47	5	3	0	1	0	1	0	52	5
Southport	2011–12	Conference Premier	7	0	—		—		0	0	7	0
Hereford United	2012–13	Conference Premier	33	12	3	1	—		2 (Note: Appearances in the FA Trophy)	1	38	14
Hereford United	2013–14	Conference Premier	18	3	2	1	—		1	0	21	4
Hereford United	Hereford total		51	15	5	2	0	0	3	1	59	18
Kidderminster Harriers	2013–14	Conference Premier	17	0	—		—		—		17	0
Kidderminster Harriers	2014–15	Conference Premier	3	0	1	0	—		0	0	4	0
Kidderminster Harriers	Kidderminster total		20	0	1	0	0	0	0	0	21	0
Telford United (loan)	2014–15	Conference Premier	5	0	0	0	—		0	0	5	0
Chester (loan)	2014–15	Conference Premier	3	0	0	0	—		0	0	3	0
Altrincham	2015–16	National League	27	1	2	0	—		2	0	31	1
Chorley	2016–17	National League North	31	2	0	0	—		0	0	31	2
Chorley	2017–18	National League North	19	2	3	0	—		1	0	23	2
Chorley	Chorley total		50	4	3	0	0	0	1	0	54	4
Career total			223	25	14	2	1	0	7	1	245	28

== Personal life ==
In 2018 he graduated from the University of Salford with a first class degree in physiotherapy.

He is married.
