= Nathaniel Taylor =

Nathaniel Taylor may refer to:

== People ==
- Nathaniel William Taylor (1786–1858), American Protestant theologian
- Nathaniel Taylor (general) (c. 1771–c. 1816), American general in the War of 1812, builder of Sabine Hill and grandfather of Nathaniel Green Taylor
- Nathaniel Green Taylor (1819–1887), U.S. Representative from Tennessee
- Kenneth N. Taylor (1917–2005), American publisher and author, creator of The Living Bible, founder of Tyndale House
- Nathaniel Taylor (actor) (1938-2019), American television actor
- Nathaniel Taylor (artist) (born 1969), American sculptor

== Ship ==
- USS Nathaniel Taylor, an American Union steamer

== See also ==
- Nathan Taylor (disambiguation)
