= Sam Turner (footballer, born 1993) =

English footballer

Personal information
- Full name: Samuel James Turner
- Date of birth: 30 August 1993 (age 33)
- Place of birth: Lincoln, England
- Positions: Right back; right winger; forward

Team information
- Current team: Ånge IF

Youth career
- 2008–2010: Lincoln City

Senior career*
Years	Team	Apps	(Gls)
2010–2011	Lincoln City	2	(0)
2011–2013	Lincoln Moorlands Railway		
2013–	Ånge IF		
- * Club domestic league appearances and goals as of 19:09, 10 July 2013 (UTC)

Samuel James Turner (born 30 August 1993) is an English professional footballer who plays in Sweden for Ånge IF, as a right back, right winger and forward.

== Career ==
Born in Lincoln, Turner made his debut for hometown club Lincoln City on 9 October 2010, in a Football League match against Macclesfield Town. He left the club following the end of the 2010–11 season, having made two appearances for them in the Football League, to join local non-league club Lincoln Moorlands Railway.

In April 2013 he joined Swedish club Ånge IF.

== Playing style ==
After primarily playing in England as a right winger and forward, Turner began to play more as a right back when he moved to Sweden.

== Career statistics ==
As of 28 March 2013

Appearances and goals by club, season and competition
Club	Season	League		FA Cup		League Cup		Other		Total	
Club	Season	Apps	Goals	Apps	Goals	Apps	Goals	Apps	Goals	Apps	Goals
Lincoln City	2010–11	2	0	0	0	0	0	0	0	2	0
Career total		2	0	0	0	0	0	0	0	2	0
