= Jamie Clarke (footballer, born 1988) =

English footballer

Personal information
- Full name: Andre Nathan Jermaine Everton Clarke
- Date of birth: 11 September 1988 (age 38)
- Place of birth: Hammersmith, England
- Height: 5 ft 10 in (1.78 m)
- Position: Striker

Youth career
- –2007: Blackburn Rovers

Senior career*
Years	Team	Apps	(Gls)
2007–2009	Blackburn Rovers	0	(0)
2008	→ Accrington Stanley (loan)	15	(5)
2009	Rotherham United	11	(2)
2009–2010	Lincoln City	20	(1)
Total		46	(8)
- * Club domestic league appearances and goals

Andre Nathan Jermaine Everton Clarke (born 11 September 1988) is an English criminal and former professional footballer.

== Career ==
=== Blackburn Rovers and loan to Accrington ===
Clarke was loaned to Accrington Stanley on 28 July 2008, until the end of December 2008. On 28 December 2008 he scored a hat-trick at home to Grimsby, bringing his goal tally to 5 in a total of 16 league and cup appearances for Accrington.

=== Rotherham United ===
On 2 February 2009, Clarke joined Rotherham United on a free transfer until the end of the 2008–09 season. He made his debut on 14 February 2009 against Gillingham, and scored the first goal in a 2–0 win.

At the end of the 2008–2009 season, Clarke was told he was not to be offered a new deal at Rotherham United and so became a free agent.

=== Lincoln City ===
On 3 June 2009, it was confirmed that the striker had agreed terms with Lincoln City manager Peter Jackson. The contract was due to begin on 1 July 2009. Clarke was the Imps' second signing of the summer. However, Clarke left Lincoln City by mutual consent on 29 January 2010 after scoring just one league goal in 20 appearances.

== Drug gang activity, criminal conviction and imprisonment ==
In January 2018, Clarke was jailed for 15 years after being found guilty of affray, kidnapping, causing grievous bodily harm with intent and two counts of false imprisonment. As the ringleader of a drug-dealing gang, he had taken over a man's home in an act of cuckooing before kidnapping him; after tying the man up, Clarke and an accomplice, Sakhawat Hussain, tortured the man, pouring boiling water over his genitals and also subjecting him to acts of humiliation. The victim suffered broken bones in his nose, cheeks, and upper and lower jaws, as well as bruising and swelling to his face and arms, and blisters, skin loss and reddening to his legs, buttocks and genitals. Several days prior to the attack, both Hussain and Clarke had also made threats to murder the unborn child of the victim and his heavily pregnant partner.

== Career statistics ==
Appearances and goals by club, season and competition
Club	Season	League			FA Cup		League Cup		Other		Total	
Club	Season	Division	Apps	Goals	Apps	Goals	Apps	Goals	Apps	Goals	Apps	Goals
Blackburn Rovers	2008–09	Premier League	0	0	0	0	0	0	0	0	0	0
Accrington Stanley (loan)	2008–09	League Two	15	5	0	0	1	0	1 (Note: Appearance(s) in Football League Trophy)	0	17	5
Rotherham United (loan)	2008–09	League Two	11	2	0	0	0	0	0	0	11	2
Lincoln City	2009–10	League Two	20	1	2	3	1	0	0	0	23	4
Career total			46	8	2	3	2	0	1	0	51	11
