= Liam Willis =

English footballer (born 1993)

Personal information
- Full name: Liam James Willis
- Date of birth: 21 May 1993 (age 33)
- Place of birth: Liverpool, England
- Height: 6 ft 4 in (1.93 m)
- Position: Defender

Team information
- Current team: Marine
- Number: 3

Youth career
- 2008–2009: Southport
- 2009–2011: Wigan Athletic

Senior career*
Years	Team	Apps	(Gls)
2012	Accrington Stanley	2	(0)
2012–2014	Southport	16	(3)
2013–2014	→ Barrow (loan)	1	(0)
2014– 2015	Barrow		
2015	Marine	35	(3)
- * Club domestic league appearances and goals as of 18:43, 13 February 2013 (UTC)

Liam James Willis (born 21 May 1993) is an English footballer playing as a defender for Marine.

== Career ==
Willis signed his first professional contract at Wigan Athletic in the summer of 2011 after joining from Southport. He progressed through the youth system initially, however, he was released in later in the same year. On 18 January 2012, he signed for Football League Two side Accrington Stanley after training with the club. He made his professional debut on 18 February 2012, in a 4–0 defeat to Plymouth Argyle, coming on as a substitute for Micah Evans. In May 2012, Willis was released from Accrington after being told his contract would not be renewed.

=== Southport ===
Willis signed for Conference Premier side Southport on 14 September 2013, the club where he had spent time as a youth player three years earlier. He made his debut on 25 September as a second-half substitute against Stockport County, he scored a late equaliser, the game ending in a 1–1 draw. His second goal came against Macclesfield Town in 'Port's Boxing Day match, and he notched a 3rd Southport goal against Barrow on 12 February 2013. All three goals were scored at Southport's home ground Haig Avenue.
