= Andy Hutchinson =

English footballer

Personal information
- Full name: Andrew Leslie Hutchinson
- Date of birth: 10 March 1992 (age 34)
- Place of birth: Lincoln, England
- Position: Striker

Youth career
- –2009: Lincoln City

Senior career*
Years	Team	Apps	(Gls)
2009–2012	Lincoln City	19	(1)
2009	→ Hinckley United (loan)	3	(0)
2011	→ Harrogate Town (loan)	3	(1)
2011	→ Lewes (loan)	18	(1)
2012	Lincoln United	5	(2)
2013	Eastwood Town	6	(2)
2013–2019	Lincoln United		
2019–2020	Skegness Town		
- * Club domestic league appearances and goals as of 00:00, 8 May 2011 (UTC)

Andrew Leslie Hutchinson (born 10 March 1992) is an English former professional footballer who played as a striker.

He notably played in the Football League for Lincoln City and had loan spells with Hinckley United, Harrogate Town and Lewes before moving into a career in non-league football with Lincoln United, Eastwood Town and Skegness Town

== Career ==
=== Lincoln City ===
Born in Lincoln, Lincolnshire, Hutchinson was drafted into The Imps squad during the 2008–2009 season. He made 4 appearances in total in his first season, scoring his first professional goal of his career in a 1–1 away draw with Bradford City. In 2009, he spent a month on loan with Conference North side Hinckley United. At the end of his scholarship, Hutchinson alongside fellow scholars Kern Miller and Nathan Adams agreed a six-month professional contract with the club.

In January 2011 Hutchinson joined Conference North side Harrogate Town on loan.

In May 2011 he was one of just three squad players to be offered a new contract by Lincoln after a mass clear out of players following relegation from the Football League. Hutchinson, however was to miss the entire 2011–12 season due to injury and was released at the end of May.

=== Non-League ===
In September 2012 he signed a short-term deal for Lincoln United, but departed after several months to concentrate on works qualifications. He returned to United in May 2013. In October 2013 Hutchinson joined Eastwood Town.
