= Nathan Adams =

English footballer (born 1991)

Personal information
- Date of birth: 6 October 1991 (age 35)
- Place of birth: Lincoln, England
- Position: Forward

Youth career
- Lincoln City

Senior career*
Years	Team	Apps	(Gls)
2008–2010	Lincoln City	4	(0)
2010	→ Stamford (loan)	1	(1)
2010–2011	Stamford		
2011–2012	Lincoln Moorlands Railway	8	(12)
2012–2013	Lincoln United	0	(0)
2013–2014	Carlton Town	0	(0)
2015–201?	Spalding United		
- * Club domestic league appearances and goals as of 19:45, 28 September 2009 (UTC)

Nathan Mark Adams (born 6 October 1991) is an English former professional footballer who played as a forward. He notably played briefly in the Football League for Lincoln City, before stints at Non-league level for Stamford, Lincoln Moorlands Railway and Lincoln United.

== Career ==
=== Lincoln City ===
Adams joined the Centre of Excellence at Lincoln City at under-8 level and progressed through the centre to agree a two-year Apprenticeship for Sporting Excellence (ASE) scholarship with the club in May 2008.

Adams was drafted into The Imps squad during the 2008–2009 season. He made 2 appearances in total in his first season at Sincil Bank. His debut came on 18 April 2009 in the 1–0 defeat home against Exeter City. At the end of his scholarship, Adams alongside fellow scholars Kern Miller and Andy Hutchinson agreed a six-month professional contract with the club. In November 2010 he joined Stamford on a month's loan, debuting in the club's 1–0 defeat at Rushall Olympic on 6 November 2011.

=== Non-League ===
On 15 December 2010 his contract with the Imps was terminated by mutual consent and he joined Stamford on a permanent basis.

Having secured a new job, he elected to join a club closer to home and linked up with Lincoln Moorlands Railway, debuting in the club's Northern Counties East League 4–3 defeat at home to Scarborough Athletic on 16 February 2011. He opened his goalscoring account for the club with a hat-trick in the following game, an 8–2 away victory over Armthorpe Welfare on 19 February 2011, and went on to net 11 league goals for the club in the 2010–2011 season.

In February 2015, after a spell away from the game due to work commitments, he joined Spalding United.
