= Luke Dobie =

English footballer

Personal information
- Full name: Luke Jeffrey Dobie
- Date of birth: 7 October 1992 (age 34)
- Place of birth: Ormskirk, England
- Position: Midfielder

Youth career
- Crewe Alexandra
- 2003–2011: Everton

Senior career*
Years	Team	Apps	(Gls)
2011–2012	Middlesbrough	0	(0)
2011–2012	→ Accrington Stanley (loan)	4	(0)
2012–2013	Bristol City	0	(0)
2014	Wigan Athletic	0	(0)
Total		4	(0)
- * Club domestic league appearances and goals as of 21:20, 19 January 2012 (UTC)

Luke Jeffrey Dobie (born 7 October 1992) is an English former professional footballer who played as a midfielder.

== Career ==
=== Youth career ===
Dobie started his career in the youth team of Crewe Alexandra, but left as a youngster to join Everton. He progressed through the youth system at Everton playing regularly for the youth team and reserve side. However, he was released from the club in 2011.

=== Middlesbrough ===
In April 2011 he was offered a trial at Championship side Middlesbrough, after he had impressed playing against the club in an FA Youth Cup tie earlier in the season. His trial was successful and he signed his first professional contract on a one-year deal.

=== Accrington Stanley (loan) ===
In October 2011, he joined League Two side Accrington Stanley on loan until January 2012. He made his debut for the club a day later in a 2–0 home defeat to Swindon Town, after coming on as a substitute for Andrew Procter. He made 4 appearances for the club before returning to Middlesbrough.

=== Return to Middlesbrough ===
He returned to Middlesbrough on 3 January 2012, at the end of his loan spell at League Two side Accrington Stanley. In June 2012 Luke was not offered a new contract by the management team at Middlesbrough and was subsequently released from the club.

=== Bristol City ===
He was picked up by Bristol City in 2012. He left Bristol City at the end of the season having not played a game for the club.

=== Wigan Athletic ===
On 14 January 2014, Dobie joined Wigan Athletic after a successful trial.

== Personal life ==
Dobie attended Maricourt Catholic School and now owns multiple businesses in the takeaway food and drink industry.
