= Adam Black (footballer, born 1992) =

English footballer

Personal information
- Full name: Adam James Black
- Date of birth: 24 May 1992 (age 34)
- Place of birth: Liverpool, England
- Height: 1.87 m (6 ft 2 in)
- Position: Forward

Youth career
- –2009: Accrington Stanley

College career
Years	Team	Apps	(Gls)
2011–2013	Oklahoma City Stars	52	(41)

Senior career*
Years	Team	Apps	(Gls)
2009–2010	Accrington Stanley	1	(0)
2010–2011	Alsager Town		
2011–2014	Oklahoma City		
2014	Austin Aztex		
2015	Tulsa Roughnecks	25	(3)
- * Club domestic league appearances and goals as of 18:13, 15 September 2015 (UTC)

Adam James Black (born 24 May 1992) (Note: Most sources show his birth date as 24 May 1992 but Soccerbase mistakenly shows 25 October 1986) is an English footballer who played as a forward.

== Career ==
He started as a trainee with Accrington Stanley and made one senior appearance for the club, coming on as a substitute for John Miles on 10 October 2009 in a Football League Two match with Cheltenham Town. He left the club in May 2010 and joined Alsager Town.

=== United States ===
Black then went to study at Oklahoma City University for three years where he played college soccer, scoring 41 goals during his time. After leaving college, he played for USL side Tulsa Roughnecks during the 2015 season, scoring three times in 25 games.

== Trivia ==
Whilst a sixteen-year-old with Accrington in 2008 he was selected to compete in the Skill Skool competition against his teammate Scott Craggs, as part of Accrington's appearance on Soccer AM.
