= Nat Taylor (footballer) =

English footballer

Personal information
- Full name: Nathaniel David Taylor
- Date of birth: 3 September 1992 (age 34)
- Place of birth: Manchester, England
- Position: Winger

Team information
- Current team: Ramsbottom United

Senior career*
Years	Team	Apps	(Gls)
2011–2012	Accrington Stanley	2	(0)
2012	Clitheroe	10	(0)
2012–2016	Nelson	30	(5)
2016–	Ramsbottom United	5	(0)
- * Club domestic league appearances and goals as of 13:00, 14 May 2014 (UTC)

Nathaniel David Taylor (born 3 September 1992) is an English professional footballer who played in the Football League as a winger for Accrington Stanley. He currently plays for Ramsbottom United.

== Career ==
Taylor started his career as captain of the football academy at Accrington and Rossendale College, also representing the England College side. He also spent some time on trial with Bury and Scunthorpe United. In the summer of 2011, Taylor spent time on trial at Football League Two side Accrington Stanley for pre-season after being recommended by former Stanley coach Paul Lodge. In August 2011 after a successful trial, Taylor joined Stanley permanently initially on non-contract terms. He made his professional debut for the club in the same month, coming on as a substitute for Kurtis Guthrie in the 2–0 defeat to Scunthorpe United in the Football League Cup. Later in August, Taylor signed a six-month professional contract with the club, opting to turn down the chance to attend university to study a sports degree. His league debut came in a 2–1 defeat to Southend United. His first start and final appearance for Stanley came in a 1–0 win over Bradford City. In January 2012, Taylor was released from his contract by mutual consent. In February 2012, Taylor joined Northern Premier League Division One North side Clitheroe, making his debut in a 2–0 defeat to Ossett Town. He made a total of ten appearances for Clitheroe with his final appearance coming in a defeat to AFC Fylde in April 2012. His spell at Clitheroe was short and Taylor joined North West Counties Football League First Division side Nelson in November 2012. Taylor impressed in his first season with the club as Nelson finished in mid-table. He signed a new one-year contract in July 2013, turning down a number of clubs higher up the football pyramid. In August 2013, after a bright start to the season he suffered a fractured fibula and was out of action for five months. In January 2014, after making a full recovery, he returned to first team training. He finished the season with seven appearances and one goal as Nelson were crowned champions and gained promotion to the NWCFL Premier Division. In May 2014, Taylor committed himself to Nelson for another season.

== Career statistics ==
As of match played 28 August 2013.

Club statistics
Club	Season	League			FA Cup		League Cup		Other		Total	
Club	Season	Division	Apps	Goals	Apps	Goals	Apps	Goals	Apps	Goals	Apps	Goals
Accrington Stanley	2011–12	League Two	2	0	0	0	1	0	0	0	3	0
Clitheroe	2011–12	NPL Division One North	10	0	0	0	—		0	0	10	0
Nelson	2012–13	NWCFL First Division	23	4	—		—		1 (Note: Appearance in NWCFL First Division Challenge Cup)	0	24	4
Nelson	2013–14	NWCFL First Division	7	1	—		—		0	0	7	1
Nelson	Total		30	5	—		—		1	0	31	5
Career total			42	5	0	0	1	0	1	0	44	5

== Honours ==
Nelson

- North West Counties Football League First Division: 2013–14
