= Jimmy Ryan (footballer, born 1988) =

Irish professional footballer (born 1988)

Personal information
- Full name: James Ryan
- Date of birth: 6 September 1988 (age 38)
- Place of birth: Liverpool, England
- Height: 5 ft 11 in (1.80 m)
- Position: Midfielder

Youth career
- Liverpool

Senior career*
Years	Team	Apps	(Gls)
2005–2008	Liverpool	0	(0)
2007	→ Shrewsbury Town (loan)	1	(0)
2008	Shrewsbury Town	3	(0)
2008–2011	Accrington Stanley	129	(22)
2011–2013	Scunthorpe United	69	(4)
2013–2015	Chesterfield	83	(6)
2015–2017	Fleetwood Town	59	(2)
2017–2019	Blackpool	37	(3)
2019–2021	Rochdale	38	(1)
Total		419	(38)

International career
2008–2009	Republic of Ireland U21	4	(1)
- * Club domestic league appearances and goals

James Ryan (born 6 September 1988) is an Irish former professional footballer that played as a midfielder. He made 419 league appearances in the EFL and was capped four times for the Republic of Ireland Under-21.

== Career ==
Ryan began his career with Liverpool, and was part of their FA Youth Cup winning teams of 2006 and 2007. He plays for Republic of Ireland at youth level. He is known for his shots from distance, which accounted for most of his goals in the two FA Youth Cup runs.

It was announced on 14 August 2007, that Ryan was to join League Two side Shrewsbury Town on a month's loan. He made his debut for Shrewsbury on 14 August 2007, playing the full 120 minutes of the 1–0 win over Colchester United in the League Cup. In October, a permanent deal was agreed, effective from 1 January 2008. In the interim period, Ryan was still technically a loan player, but was unable to play for Shrewsbury between 26 November and 1 January, due to a 93-day restriction on short-term loans. He made a total of seven appearances, before being released by the club on 29 April 2008.

In August 2008, Ryan signed for Accrington Stanley, following a trial. He scored his first goal for the Republic of Ireland U21 in Lithuania in October 2008. He signed a new two-year deal with Accrington in June 2009. After his performances for Accrington Stanley throughout the 2010–11 League Two season he was voted in the PFA Team of the Year.

On 28 June 2011 he signed a two-year contract with League One side Scunthorpe United. A tribunal later set the transfer fee, with £55,000 paid immediately and further due in add-ons.

On 5 June 2013 Ryan signed a one-year contract with League Two side Chesterfield, having rejected the offer of a new contract at Scunthorpe. He agreed a one-year contract extension in January 2014.

On 17 June 2015, Ryan signed for Fleetwood Town on a two-year contract, having rejected a new contract at Chesterfield. After 67 appearances and winning the club's Player of the Year in 2016, Ryan penned a two-year deal with Blackpool in July 2017.

On 29 July 2019, Ryan signed a two-year deal with Rochdale. On 19 May 2021, Rochdale confirmed their 2020-21 Retained/Release List, with Ryan being confirmed as one of the players set to depart the club upon the expiration of his contract on 30 June. Ryan made 38 league appearances for the club, scoring on one occasion against Bolton Wanderers in a 2–0 win on 11 January 2020.

== Career statistics ==
Appearances and goals by club, season and competition
Club	Season	League			FA Cup		League Cup		Other		Total	
Club	Season	Division	Apps	Goals	Apps	Goals	Apps	Goals	Apps	Goals	Apps	Goals
Liverpool	2007–08	Premier League	0	0	0	0	0	0	0	0	0	0
Shrewsbury Town	2007–08 (Note: Part of this season was spent on loan from Liverpool)	League Two	4	0	0	0	2	0	1 (Note: Appearance(s) in Football League Trophy)	0	7	0
Accrington Stanley	2008–09	League Two	44	10	2	0	1	0	0	0	47	10
Accrington Stanley	2009–10	League Two	39	3	5	1	2	0	4	0	50	4
Accrington Stanley	2010–11	League Two	46	9	1	1	2	0	3 (Note: One appearance in Football League Trophy and two in League Two play-offs)	0	52	10
Accrington Stanley	Total		129	22	8	2	5	0	7	0	149	24
Scunthorpe United	2011–12	League One	24	2	0	0	2	0	1	0	27	2
Scunthorpe United	2012–13	League One	45	2	1	0	2	0	1	0	49	2
Scunthorpe United	Total		69	4	1	0	4	0	2	0	76	4
Chesterfield	2013–14	League Two	39	2	2	1	1	0	6	1	48	4
Chesterfield	2014–15	League One	44	4	4	0	1	0	3 (Note: One appearance in Football League Trophy and two in League One play-offs)	0	52	4
Chesterfield	Total		83	6	6	1	2	0	9	1	100	8
Fleetwood Town	2015–16	League One	43	2	1	0	1	0	4	1	49	3
Fleetwood Town	2016–17	League One	16	0	1	0	1	0	0	0	18	0
Fleetwood Town	Total		59	2	2	0	2	0	4	1	67	3
Blackpool	2017–18	League One	36	3	1	0	0	0	1 (Note: Appearance(s) in EFL Trophy)	0	38	3
Blackpool	2018–19	League One	1	0	0	0	0	0	0	0	1	0
Blackpool	Total		37	3	1	0	0	0	1	0	39	3
Rochdale	2019–20	League One	24	1	5	0	2	0	3	0	34	1
Rochdale	2020–21	League One	14	0	1	0	2	0	0	0	17	0
Rochdale	Total		38	1	6	0	4	0	3	0	51	1
Career total			419	38	24	3	19	0	27	2	489	43

== Honours ==
Liverpool Youth

- FA Youth Cup: 2005–06, 2006–07

Chesterfield

- Football League Two: 2013–14
- Football League Trophy runner-up: 2013–14

Individual

- PFA Team of the Year: 2010–11 Football League Two
- Accrington Stanley Player of the Season: 2008–09, 2010–11
- Fleetwood Town Player of the Season: 2015–16
