= Robbie Williams (footballer, born 1979) =

English footballer

Personal information
- Full name: Robert Williams
- Date of birth: 12 April 1979 (age 47)
- Place of birth: Liverpool, England
- Position: Defender

Team information
- Current team: Warrington Town

Youth career
- Southport

Senior career*
Years	Team	Apps	(Gls)
????–1999	St Dominics		
1999–2009	Accrington Stanley	238	(11)
2010–2012	Southport	11	(0)
2012–	Warrington Town	1	(0)
- * Club domestic league appearances and goals as of 08:14, 29 October 2012 (UTC)

Robert "Robbie" Williams (born 12 April 1979) is an English footballer who plays for Warrington Town.

== Accrington Stanley ==
Williams signed for Accrington Stanley in July 1999 from Liverpool County Football Combination side St Dominics. He played for the club for ten years, making 238 league appearances for the club, and picking up championship winning medals for the Northern Premier Division One in 2000, the Northern Premier League in 2003 and the Conference National in 2006, seeing the club promoted to the Football League.

=== Illegal betting and subsequent ban ===
In April 2009, Williams, who at the time was the club's longest serving player, along Stanley teammates Peter Cavanagh, Jay Harris and David Mannix and Bury player Andy Mangan were charged with breaching the Football Association's betting rules, with some accused of gambling thousands of pounds on their team to lose. The scandal related to Accrington Stanley's last game of the last League Two season, at home to Bury.

In July 2009, the players (except Cavanagh, whose case was to be heard at a later date) were banned for varying lengths after being found guilty of being involved in betting on a Bury win when the Shakers visited the Crown Ground at the end of the 2007/08 season – a game that Bury went on to win. Williams was suspended from professional football for eight months and received a £3,500 fine, and was released by Stanley. The players appealed against their bans but lost their cases.

== Southport ==
In March 2010 he agreed to join Southport and finally joined up with the club in May.

== Warrington Town ==
In October 2012 he signed for Warrington Town making his club debut on 13 October in a 1–1 draw with Salford City.

== Honours ==
- Northern Premier Division One (VII): 2000
- Northern Premier League (VI): 2003
- Conference National (V): 2006
