= James Spray =

English footballer

Personal information
- Date of birth: 2 December 1992 (age 33)
- Place of birth: Halesowen, England
- Position: Striker

Youth career
- 2006–2011: Wolverhampton Wanderers

Senior career*
Years	Team	Apps	(Gls)
2011–2012	Wolverhampton Wanderers	0	(0)
2011	→ Accrington Stanley (loan)	3	(0)
2012–2013	AFC Telford United	37	(2)
2013	→Stourbridge (loan)	3	(1)
2013	Stourbridge	?	(?)
2013	Bedworth United	?	(?)
2013–2016	Lye Town	73	(31)
2016	Alvechurch	6	(0)
- * Club domestic league appearances and goals as of 16 July 2017 (UTC)

James Spray (born 2 December 1992) is an English footballer who played as a striker in the Football League for Accrington Stanley. He last played for Alvechurch.

== Career ==
Spray joined Wolverhampton Wanderers in 2006 to become part of their academy group, signing a professional contract in 2009. After featuring on the bench during the 2009–10 season, he was given his senior debut and scored on 20 September 2011 as a substitute in a League Cup win against Millwall.

He joined League Two side Accrington Stanley on a month-long loan in October 2011. Spray made his Football League debut for Accrington Stanley on 21 October 2011, playing the full 90 minutes against Cheltenham Town. He returned to Wolves at the end of his loan spell on 31 October 2011.

His contract at Wolves expired in the summer of 2012 and was not renewed. After a successful trial with AFC Telford United playing all of their pre-season friendlies he signed a one-year deal with them.

He scored his first goal for Telford in his first competitive start, scoring in the 15th minute against Braintree Town. His second goal came in a 3–3 draw versus Cambridge United

He signed for Stourbridge on a 28-day loan scoring in his debut. On 11 March 2013, he rejoined AFC Telford United.

At the end of a poor season for Telford, Spray was not offered a new contract for the next season. During pre-season Spray joined up with Stourbridge FC on trial.
