= Peter Cavanagh =

English footballer (born 1981)

Personal information
- Full name: Peter Joseph Cavanagh
- Date of birth: 14 October 1981 (age 45)
- Place of birth: Bootle, Merseyside, England
- Height: 5 ft 9 in (1.75 m)
- Position: Right back

Youth career
- 1991–2001: Liverpool

Senior career*
Years	Team	Apps	(Gls)
2001–2009	Accrington Stanley	226	(22)
2010–2012	Fleetwood Town	39	(3)
2012–2014	Rochdale	51	(2)
2014–2015	Altrincham	28	(0)
2015	Southport	0	(0)
Total		344	(28)

International career
2003–2004	England C	1	(0)
- * Club domestic league appearances and goals

Peter Joseph Cavanagh (born 14 October 1981) is an English football coach and former player.

Before joining Fleetwood in 2010 he played for Accrington Stanley, where he was made the youngest ever captain of Accrington after joining the club in 2001. He was an England C international in the 2003–04 season. His Accrington career ended in 2009 after he received a ban from the FA for betting against his own team.

== Playing career ==
=== Accrington Stanley ===
Cavanagh was born in Bootle, Merseyside, England. He was part of the youth team at Liverpool, but left for Accrington Stanley in September 2001 after realising he did not have a future at Anfield.

He was appointed as captain soon after joining in 2001, and scored 22 goals in 226 league games in an eight-year career. He skippered the club to the Northern Premier League Cup and Lancashire FA Challenge Trophy in 2002, the Northern Premier League title in 2002–03, and Conference National title in 2005–06.

==== Ban from football ====
In July 2009, Accrington players Jay Harris, Robert Williams, David Mannix, and Andy Mangan received 5–12-month bans for betting against their own club. Cavanagh's case was held at a later date. On 7 April 2009 Cavanagh was charged by the FA for breaching betting rules, being alleged to have placed a £5 bet on Accrington losing to Bury in the last match of the 2008–09 season. Bury won the match 2–0. On 10 August 2009, he was fined £3,500 and suspended from competitive football for eight months.

=== Return to football with Fleetwood Town ===
Following the end of his ban, Cavanagh signed with Fleetwood Town in June 2010.

=== Rochdale ===
On 8 June 2012, Cavangh joined Football League Two side Rochdale on a free transfer, linking up with former manager John Coleman.

=== Altrincham ===
After his release from Rochdale, Peter joined Altrincham.

=== Southport ===
He then signed for Southport in May 2015 as a player coach alongside manager Paul Carden.

== Coaching career ==
Shortly after joining Southport, Cavanagh took up a full-time post as a foundation coach at Everton, retiring from playing to focus on this stage of his career. On 3 July 2023, Cavanagh joined newly promoted Championship club Plymouth Argyle in the role of first-team coach to Steven Schumacher. Cavanagh followed Schumacher to Stoke City in December 2023. He left Stoke in September 2024.
