= Micah Evans =

English footballer (born 1993)

Personal information
- Date of birth: 3 March 1993 (age 33)
- Place of birth: Manchester, England
- Position: Winger

Youth career
- 2008–2011: Blackburn Rovers

Senior career*
Years	Team	Apps	(Gls)
2011–2013	Blackburn Rovers	0	(0)
2011–2012	→ Accrington Stanley (loan)	23	(3)
2012–2013	→ Chesterfield (loan)	4	(0)
2013	→ Macclesfield Town (loan)	2	(0)
2013–2014	Burnley	0	(0)
2013–2014	→ Hereford United (loan)	6	(0)
2014–2015	Southport	16	(0)
2015	→ Worcester City (loan)	7	(2)
2015–2016	Stockport County	11	(2)
2016	→ Chorley (loan)	10	(1)
2016	AFC Telford United	12	(2)
2016–2017	Worcester City	6	(0)
2017	Altrincham	4	(0)
2017	FC United of Manchester	0	(0)
- * Club domestic league appearances and goals as of 20 March 2017 (UTC)

Micah Evans (born 3 March 1993) is an English footballer who plays as a winger.

== Career ==
=== Blackburn Rovers ===
Born in Manchester, Evans progressed through the youth system at Blackburn Rovers following his release by Manchester City. He then signed his first professional contract in the summer of 2011 having featured for the Reserve side.

He made his first appearance for Blackburn's first team in a pre-season friendly against Accrington Stanley in July 2011. His performance in that match persuaded Accrington Stanley manager John Coleman to sign Evans in October 2011, on a one-month youth loan deal with the Football League Two club. Evans scored five minutes into his Accrington Stanley debut, a 2–1 win over Bristol Rovers at the Crown Ground, playing ninety minutes on 5 November 2011. His second goal for the club came on 3 December 2011, in a 1–1 draw away at Hereford United, levelling from close range. Halfway through December after making four appearances for Accrington Stanley, his loan was extended until the end of the season. He scored again three days later with a tap in against Macclesfield Town in a 4–0 home win. His final appearance for Accrington came on the final game of the season, a 1–0 defeat to Crawley Town, replacing Marcus Carver in the second half. Despite his form slumped towards the end of the season, Evans made a total of 23 appearances for Accrington scoring three goals.

Blackburn were relegated to the Football League Championship in the summer of 2012 from the Premier League, with Evans joining League Two side Chesterfield in September on a three-month loan deal. His debut came in a 1–1 home draw with Torquay United, when he replaced Drew Talbot in the second half. His first start for Spireites came in the Football League Trophy defeat to Doncaster Rovers. His final appearance for Chesterfield came in 1–0 home defeat to Barnet on 27 October, replacing Tendayi Darikwa as a substitute. He made a total four appearances for Chesterfield, scoring no goals before returning to his parent club in November.

On 31 January 2013, Evans joined Conference Premier side Macclesfield Town on a one-month loan deal. His debut for Macc came in a 0–0 league draw away at Tamworth, when he replaced Jack Mackreth as a substitute. His second and final game for the Silkmen came in a 4–0 home defeat to Gateshead. After making two appearances, Evans' loan spell at Macclesfield Town came to an end and returned to his parent club.

In June 2013, Blackburn confirmed that Evans would not be having his contract renewed and he was released at the end of the season, having never made a professional appearance.

=== Burnley ===
Evans signed for Championship side and local rivals Burnley in November 2013, on a one-year professional contract, having spent time with the club since pre-season. He had appeared several times for the Development Squad after initially joining on trial in the summer.

In November 2013 that Evans joined Conference Premier side Hereford United on a youth loan until January 2014. He made his debut the same day in a 3–2 home win over FC Halifax Town. Evans made a total of six appearances for the club before returning to his parent club after Hereford United was unable to extend his loan spell, due to embargo.

In May 2014, he was released by Burnley following the expiration of his contract.

=== Southport ===
On 1 August 2014, he signed for Conference Premier side Southport on a free transfer, having trained with the club during pre-season. Evans made his Southport debut on 16 August 2014, playing 90 minutes, in a 0-0 draw against Torquay United. However, Evans suffered a hamstring injury that kept him out of the sidelined for a month.

On 12 February 2015, Evans was loaned out to Worcester City on a one-month deal. Evans made his Worcester City debut two days later, where he made an impression in right wing, in a 3-0 win over Colwyn Bay. Evans then scored his first Worcester City goal on 7 March 2015, in a 2-0 win over Gainsborough Trinity, followed up by scoring a week later, in a 4-0 win over Solihull Moors. With six appearances and scoring two times in total, Evans returned to Southport in late-March. After returning to his parent club, Evans made a few more appearance for Southport.

=== Stockport County ===
On 24 June 2015, Evans joined Stockport County after he decided to leave Southport. Evans made his Stockport County in the opening game of the season, in a 1-0 win over Telford United. Evans then scored his first Stockport County goal on 3 October 2015, in a 1-0 win over Gainsborough Trinity. Three weeks later on 24 October 2015, Evans' second goal came in a 2-0 win over Bradford Park Avenue.

However, Evans' first team opportunities soon became limited, having not played since December and was subsequently loaned out to Chorley until the end of the season. Evans made his Chorley debut the next day, in a 2-0 win over Curzon Ashton. Evans then scored his first Chorley goal on 9 April 2016, in a 3-1 win over Gainsborough Trinity. After making ten appearances in total for Chorley, Evans returned to his parent club, but was told that he was released by the club.

=== Later career ===
After leaving Stockport County, Evans joined Telford United following an impressive trial that convinced Telford United's management to sign him. Weeks later, on 6 August 2016, Evans made his Telford United debut, where he played 13 minutes, in a 1-0 loss against AFC Fylde. Evans then scored his first goal for the club, in a 1–0 win against Kidderminster Harriers on 6 September 2016. Despite aiming to score on a regularly for AFC Telford, he, however, struggled with his form, resulting in him dropped from the starting eleven. After spending two months at the club, Evans was released by AFC Telford, having made twelve appearances and scoring two times in all competitions.

Shortly after leaving AFC Teleford, Evans joined Worcester City, making his debut for the club and played 75 minutes before being substituted, in a 0–0 draw against Boston United. He went on to make five more appearances despite injuries along the way. In February 2017, Evans left Worcester City.

Shortly after leaving Worcester City, Evans joined Altrincham. He made his debut for the club, starting the match and played 79 minutes before being substituted, in a 0–0 draw against Harrogate Town on 18 February 2017. Evans made four more appearances for Worcester City but the club were eventually relegated at the end of the 2016–17 season. He then departed Worcester City when the 2016–17 season was concluded.

In July 2017, Evans joined FC United of Manchester but left the club later that month without playing a competitive match.

== Career statistics ==
As of match played 9 September 2014.

Club statistics
Club	Season	League			FA Cup		League Cup		Other		Total	
Club	Season	Division	Apps	Goals	Apps	Goals	Apps	Goals	Apps	Goals	Apps	Goals
Accrington Stanley (loan)	2011–12	League Two	23	3	1	0	0	0	0	0	24	3
Chesterfield (loan)	2012–13	League Two	4	0	0	0	0	0	1 (Note: Appearance(s) in Football League Trophy)	0	5	0
Macclesfield Town (loan)	2012–13	Conference Premier	2	0	0	0	—		0	0	2	0
Hereford United (loan)	2013–14	Conference Premier	6	0	0	0	—		1 (Note: Appearance(s) in FA Trophy)	0	7	0
Southport	2014–15	Conference Premier	6	0	0	0	—		0	0	6	0
Career total			41	3	1	0	0	0	2	0	44	3
