= Alan Burton (footballer, born 1991) =

English footballer

Personal information
- Full name: Alan Burton
- Date of birth: 22 February 1991 (age 35)
- Place of birth: Blackpool, England
- Height: 1.83 m (6 ft 0 in)
- Position: Midfielder

Youth career
- 2008–2009: Accrington Stanley

Senior career*
Years	Team	Apps	(Gls)
2009–2012	Accrington Stanley	2	(0)
2009	→ Marine (loan)	13	(2)
2011	→ Marine (loan)		
2012–2013	Marine		
2013–2015	Skelmersdale United		
2015–2017	Marine		
- * Club domestic league appearances and goals as of 17:53, 8 November 2015 (UTC)

Alan Burton (born 22 February 1991) is an English semi-professional footballer who plays as a midfielder.

== Career ==
Born in Blackpool, Burton played youth football with Accrington Stanley, and joined Evo-Stik League Premier Division club Marine on loan in September 2009, scoring 2 goals in 13 appearances. He became the first player to sign up after the transfer embargo placed on Accrington Stanley was lifted.

Burton had a second spell on loan at Marine in February 2011.

He made his debut for Accrington Stanley in the Football League on 7 May 2011, playing the full 90 minutes against Burton Albion. In May 2012, Burton was released from Accrington after being told his contract would not be renewed.

He re-signed for Marine on a permanent contract in August 2012, before moving to Skelmersdale United in June 2013. He returned to Marine in November 2015. He was released by the club in August 2017.
