= Kern Miller =

English footballer

Personal information
- Full name: Kern Aaron Miller
- Date of birth: 2 September 1991 (age 35)
- Place of birth: Skegness, England
- Height: 5 ft 10 in (1.78 m)
- Position: Defender

Youth career
- 2007–2009: Lincoln City

Senior career*
Years	Team	Apps	(Gls)
2009–2011	Lincoln City	1	(0)
2011–2012	Barnsley	0	(0)
2011	→ Accrington Stanley (loan)	2	(0)
2012	→ Hereford United (loan)	0	(0)
2012	Hereford United	0	(0)
2012	Gainsborough Trinity	1	(0)
2012	→ Worksop Town (loan)	8	(0)
2012	Boston United	6	(0)
2012–2013	Worksop Town		
2013–2014	Grantham Town		
2015–2016	King's Lynn Town	36	(0)
2016	Stamford	30	(1)
2017	Corby Town		
2017–2018	Gainsborough Trinity		
2018	Spalding United		
2018–2019	Stamford	15	(0)
2020–2021	Frickley Athletic	3	(1)
2021	Skegness Town	2	(0)
2021	Anstey Nomads	4	(1)
2021–2022	Newark	6	(1)
2022	Stamford	3	(0)
2022	Skegness Town	13	(0)
2023	Grantham Town	10	(0)
- * Club domestic league appearances and goals as of 15:14, 21 April 2024 (UTC)

Kern Aaron Miller (born 2 September 1991) is an English footballer who plays as a defender; he last played for Grantham Town.

He has previously played for Football League clubs Lincoln City, Barnsley, Accrington Stanley and Hereford United, as well as in non-league football for Boston United Gainsborough Trinity, Worksop Town, Grantham Town, King's Lynn Town, Stamford, Corby Town, Spalding United and Frickley Athletic.

== Career ==
=== Lincoln City ===
Miller was a produce of the Lincoln City youth team and was drafted into The Imps first team squad during the 2008–2009 season. He made 1 appearance for The Imps, the 2–0 away win over Accrington Stanley. At the end of his scholarship, Miller alongside fellow scholars Nathan Adams and Andy Hutchinson agreed a six-month professional contract with the club.

=== Barnsley ===
On 4 January 2011 after being released from Lincoln, he signed for Barnsley in the Football League Championship. On 28 July 2011 he signed a 6-month loan deal for League Two club Accrington Stanley. He made his debut on 6 August 2011 against Northampton Town. In November 2011 Miller was released from his loan deal early after suffering a broken jaw in an off the field incident. He made a total of 3 appearances. Upon his release from the loan spell at Accrington Stanley Miller joined fellow League Two club Hereford United on a loan deal till the end of the 2011/2012 season.

=== Hereford United ===
Despite not playing a single match for Hereford during a brief loan spell, he joined the club on non-contract terms following his release from Barnsley. However, he was released by the club for undisclosed reasons, again without making a first team appearance.

=== Move into non-league ===
Having already been registered for three different Football League clubs Miller was only eligible to join a club below the Conference National, so on 9 March he joined Conference North side Gainsborough Trinity on a contract until the end of the season. Miller was eventually loaned out to Worksop Town returning at the end of the season. Miller was not amongst those players retained at the end of the 2011–12 season and thus left the club.

On 23 July 2012 he joined Boston United on a one-year contract. Despite starting the Pilgrims first six Football Conference North games, he was released by the club on 8 September 2012 with the club's manager Jason Lee stating that the decision was made to enable the club to free up some money to give them room to manoeuvre in the transfer market. He moved on to join former loan club, Worksop Town.

In June 2013, he agreed terms to remain at Worksop Town for the 2013–14 season. In September 2013 Miller joined Grantham Town.

Miller signed for Southern League side King's Lynn Town in June 2015. He made a total of 41 appearances in all competitions for King's Lynn during the 2015/16 season, his only goals being a brace against Wroxham in the FA Cup.

After a spell at Stamford, Miller signed for Northern Premier League rivals Frickley Athletic in August 2020, making his debut in the F.A. Cup against Newcastle Benfield. He left the club ahead of the 2021/22 season.

In July 2021, Miller joined his home town club Skegness Town. He later moved on to Anstey Nomads, where he made four league appearances, and Newark, where he played six times, scoring once.

During the 2022-23 season, Miller returned to Stamford, and then to Skegness, before rejoining another former club, this time moving to Grantham Town.

== Personal life ==
On 16 December 2010 it was reported that Miller received a broken jaw when he was set upon and assaulted while on a night out in Blackpool.
