= Ian Dunbavin =

English footballer

Personal information
- Full name: Ian Stuart Dunbavin
- Date of birth: 27 May 1980 (age 46)
- Place of birth: Huyton, England
- Height: 6 ft 2 in (1.88 m)
- Position: Goalkeeper

Team information
- Current team: Liverpool (Under 16s goalkeeping coach)

Youth career
- 1996-1998: Liverpool

Senior career*
Years	Team	Apps	(Gls)
1998–2000	Liverpool	0	(0)
2000–2004	Shrewsbury Town	99	(0)
2004	→ Morecambe (loan)	3	(0)
2004–2006	Halifax Town	53	(0)
2006	→ Scarborough (loan)	14	(0)
2006–2014	Accrington Stanley	151	(0)
2014	→ Chesterfield (loan)	0	(0)
Total		320	(0)
- * Club domestic league appearances and goals

Ian Stuart Dunbavin (born 27 May 1980) is an English professional football coach and former player who played as a goalkeeper. He spent the majority of his career at EFL League Two side Accrington Stanley, where he amassed 151 league appearances over an 8-year period.

Dunbavin joined the Liverpool academy as a goalkeeping coach for the academy's under-16 teams on a part-time basis in 2014, before becoming a full-time addition to the club's academy in October 2016.

== Career ==
Born in Huyton, Merseyside, Dunbavin attended Christ the King Catholic High School in Southport before being offered a two-year scholarship deal at Liverpool in June 1996. He went on to sign a professional two-year deal in 1998 but ultimately went on to make no appearances for his boyhood club, leaving the club for Division Three side Shrewsbury Town on 17 January 2000 on a free transfer.

On 30 June 2004, Dunbavin left Shrewsbury following the expiration of his contract. Prior to the expiration of his contract, Dunbavin had spent time on trial in January with Scottish second-tier side Raith Rovers and Second Division club Wrexham, with no move to either club eventually materialising. He made 101 appearances in all-competitions for Shrewsbury.

On 12 July 2004, Dunbavin joined Conference National side Halifax Town, then managed by Chris Wilder. He signed an additional one-year contract with the club in April 2005 before being sent out on loan to fellow Conference outfit, and the now-defunct Scarborough in November 2005.

Following his release from Halifax at the end of the 2005–06 season, Dunbavin joined newly promoted Football League Two club Accrington Stanley on 1 July 2006.

In August 2009, Dunbavin received a suspended sentence, for his part in a brawl for which his friend Steven Gerrard had previously been arrested. He was also ordered to do 150 hours of unpaid work, and expressed "remorse and shame" for throwing two punches at the victim.

On 2 January 2014, Dunbavin was signed on a one-month emergency loan by fellow League Two side Chesterfield, managed by former Stanley manager Paul Cook. The move came after Dunbavin's falling out with then-manager James Beattie which resulted in him being dropped in favour of young loanee Marcus Bettinelli. He remained with Chesterfield until the end of the season, with Chesterfield going on to be promoted back to League One at the first time of asking as well as finishing runners-up to Peterborough United in the Football League Trophy.

Following his return to Accrington at the end of the season, Dunbavin had the final year of his contract terminated by mutual consent on 5 July 2014. He made 161 appearances in all-competitions during his 8-year stay with the Lancashire club.

Despite receiving offers elsewhere following his departure from Stanley, and speculated interest from newly promoted Chesterfield, the club at which he had spent half a season on loan prior to his release, Accrington would go on to be Dunbavin's last club as a player.

He returned to Liverpool's academy on a part-time basis in 2014, coaching the academy's under-6 to under-16 teams before becoming a full-time coach at the club in October 2016.

== Career statistics ==
Appearances and goals by club, season and competition
Club	Season	League			FA Cup		League Cup		Other		Total	
Club	Season	Division	Apps	Goals	Apps	Goals	Apps	Goals	Apps	Goals	Apps	Goals
Liverpool	1998–99	Premier League	0	0	0	0	0	0	0	0	0	0
Liverpool	1999–2000	Premier League	0	0	0	0	0	0	0	0	0	0
Total			0	0	0	0	0	0	0	0	0	0
Shrewsbury Town	1999–2000	Division Three	7	0	0	0	0	0	0	0	7	0
Shrewsbury Town	2000–01	Division Three	22	0	1	0	2	0	0	0	25	0
Shrewsbury Town	2001–02	Division Three	34	0	1	0	0	0	1 (Note: Appearance(s) in Football League Trophy)	0	36	0
Shrewsbury Town	2002–03	Division Three	33	0	4	0	1	0	6	0	44	0
Shrewsbury Town	2003–04	Conference	3	0	0	0	0	0	0	0	3	0
Total			99	0	6	0	3	0	7	0	116	0
→ Morecambe (loan)	2003–04	Conference	3	0	0	0	0	0	0	0	3	0
Total			3	0	0	0	0	0	0	0	3	0
Halifax Town	2004–05	Conference Premier	39	0	2	0	0	0	1 (Note: Appearance(s) in FA Trophy)	0	42	0
Halifax Town	2005–06	Conference Premier	14	0	0	0	0	0	0	0	14	0
Total			53	0	2	0	0	0	1	0	56	0
→ Scarborough (loan)	2005–06	Conference	14	0	0	0	0	0	0	0	14	0
Total			14	0	0	0	0	0	0	0	14	0
Accrington Stanley	2006–07	League Two	23	0	1	0	2	0	0	0	26	0
Accrington Stanley	2007–08	League Two	23	0	1	0	0	0	1	0	25	0
Accrington Stanley	2008–09	League Two	4	0	0	0	0	0	1	0	5	0
Accrington Stanley	2009–10	League Two	27	0	2	0	0	0	2	0	31	0
Accrington Stanley	2010–11	League Two	25	0	2	0	1	0	0	0	28	0
Accrington Stanley	2011–12	League Two	25	0	0	0	0	0	2	0	27	0
Accrington Stanley	2012–13	League Two	20	0	1	0	1	0	0	0	22	0
Accrington Stanley	2013–14	League Two	4	0	0	0	1	0	0	0	5	0
Total			151	0	7	0	5	0	6	0	169	0
→ Chesterfield (loan)	2013–14	League Two	0	0	0	0	0	0	0	0	0	0
Career total			320	0	15	0	8	0	14	0	357	0

== Honours ==
- FA Youth Cup: 1996

Chesterfield

- Football League Trophy runner-up: 2013–14
